= 2018–19 FC Red Bull Salzburg season =

Red Bull Salzburg
2018–19 season
- Chairman: Georgios Esplandatkoulos
- Manager: Marco Rose
- Stadium: Red Bull Arena
- Bundesliga: 1st
- Austrian Cup: Winners
- UEFA Champions League: Play-off round
- UEFA Europa League: Round of 16
- Top goalscorer: League: Mu'nas Dabbur (18); All: Mu'nas Dabbur (35)
Home colours	Away colours	Third colours

The 2018–19 FC Red Bull Salzburg season was the 86th season in club history. They were defending League champions.

== Season review ==
=== July and August ===
Red Bull Salzburg started the Bundesliga season on 29 July 2018 against LASK. Red Bull Salzburg won the match 3–1. Red Bull Salzburg got an own goal from Alexander Schlager and two goals from Mu'nas Dabbur. Maximilian Ullmann scored for LASK from the penalty spot. Matchday two took place on 4 August 2018 against SV Mattersburg. Red Bull Salzburg won the match 2–0 with goals from André Ramalho and Mu'nas Dabbur.

Red Bull Salzburg 2018–19 season started with a first round match in the Austrian Cup against ASKÖ Oedt. Red Bull Salzburg won 6–0 with two goals from Xaver Schlager, two goals from Reinhold Yabo, a goal from Smail Prevljak, and a goal from Mu'nas Dabbur.

== Kits ==
Third and Home (Europe)	Away (Europe)

== Squad ==
As of match played 26 May 2019

No.	Name	Nationality	Position	Date of birth (age)	Signed from	Signed in	Contract ends	Apps.	Goals
Goalkeepers
1	Cican Stankovic	(Austria)	GK	4 November 1992 (age 34)	SV Grödig	2015		68	0
33	Alexander Walke	(Germany)	GK	6 June 1983 (age 43)	Hansa Rostock	2010	2020	229	0
Defenders
3	Jasper van der Werff	(Switzerland)	DF	9 December 1998 (age 27)	St.Gallen	2018		5	0
5	Albert Vallci	(Austria)	DF	2 July 1995 (age 31)	Wacker Innsbruck	2019		12	1
6	Jérôme Onguéné	(Cameroon)	DF	22 December 1997 (age 28)	VfB Stuttgart	2018		44	8
15	André Ramalho	(Brazil)	DF	16 February 1992 (age 34)	Bayer 04 Leverkusen	2018		162	13
17	Andreas Ulmer	(Austria)	DF	30 December 1985 (age 40)	SV Ried	2008			
22	Stefan Lainer	(Austria)	DF	27 August 1992 (age 34)	SV Ried	2015		171	13
25	Patrick Farkas	(Austria)	DF	9 September 1992 (age 34)	SV Mattersburg	2017		26	3
34	Marin Pongračić	(Croatia)	DF	11 September 1997 (age 29)	1860 Munich	2017		49	0
55	Darko Todorović	(Bosnia and Herzegovina)	DF	5 May 1997 (age 29)	Sloboda Tuzla	2018		14	0
Midfielders
8	Diadie Samassékou	(Mali)	MF	11 January 1996 (age 30)	Real Bamako	2015		133	2
13	Hannes Wolf	(Austria)	MF	16 April 1999 (age 27)	Academy	2016		87	23
14	Dominik Szoboszlai	(Hungary)	MF	25 October 2000 (age 26)	Academy	2017		21	5
16	Zlatko Junuzović	(Austria)	MF	26 September 1987 (age 39)	Werder Bremen	2018		35	6
24	Christoph Leitgeb	(Austria)	MF	14 April 1985 (age 41)	Sturm Graz	2007			
28	Antoine Bernède	(France)	MF	26 May 1999 (age 27)	Paris Saint-Germain	2019		3	0
42	Xaver Schlager	(Austria)	MF	28 September 1997 (age 29)	Academy	2015		106	11
45	Enock Mwepu	(Zambia)	MF	1 January 1998 (age 28)	Kafue Celtic	2017		39	3
	Youba Diarra	(Mali)	MF	7 September 1998 (age 28)	Yeelen Olympique	2018		0	0
Forwards
9	Mu'nas Dabbur	(Israel)	ST	14 May 1992 (age 34)	Grasshoppers	2016		128	72
11	Smail Prevljak	(Bosnia and Herzegovina)	ST	10 May 1995 (age 31)	RB Leipzig	2014		43	14
18	Takumi Minamino	(Japan)	ST	16 January 1995 (age 31)	Cerezo Osaka	2015		177	56
20	Patson Daka	(Zambia)	ST	9 October 1998 (age 28)	Kafue Celtic	2017		39	7
21	Fredrik Gulbrandsen	(Norway)	ST	10 September 1992 (age 34)	Molde	2016	2019	106	32
30	Erling Haaland	(Norway)	ST	21 July 2000 (age 26)	Molde	2019	2024	5	1
Out on loan
19	Hwang Hee-chan	(South Korea)	ST	26 January 1996 (age 30)	Pohang Steelers	2015		86	29
31	Carlos Miguel Coronel	(Brazil)	GK	29 December 1996 (age 29)	Academy	2017		1	0
Left during the season
4	Amadou Haidara	(Mali)	MF	31 January 1998 (age 28)	JMG Academy Bamako	2016		83	13
7	Reinhold Yabo	(Germany)	MF	10 February 1992 (age 34)	Karlsruher SC	2015	2019	60	8
	Romano Schmid	(Austria)	MF	27 January 2000 (age 26)	Sturm Graz	2017		1	0

=== Out on loan ===
Note: Flags indicate national team as defined under FIFA eligibility rules; some limited exceptions apply. Players may hold more than one non-FIFA nationality.

No.	Pos.	Nation	Player
—	GK	BRA	Carlos Miguel Coronel (at Philadelphia Union)
—	DF	AUT	Luca Meisl (at SKN St. Pölten)
—	DF	BRA	Igor (at Austria Wien)
—	MF	AUT	Mathias Honsak (at Holstein Kiel)
—	MF	FRA	Mahamadou Dembélé (at Fortuna Sittard)
—	MF	GHA	Majeed Ashimeru (at St. Gallen)

No.	Pos.	Nation	Player
—	MF	MLI	Mohamed Camara (at TSV Hartberg)
—	FW	GHA	David Atanga (at SpVgg Greuther Fürth)
—	FW	GER	Mërgim Berisha (at SCR Altach)
—	FW	KOR	Hwang Hee-chan (at Hamburger SV)
—	FW	MLI	Sékou Koïta (at Wolfsberger AC)

== Transfers ==
=== In ===
Date	Position	Nationality	Name	From	Fee	Ref.
13 May 2018	MF	(Austria)	Zlatko Junuzović	Werder Bremen	Undisclosed	
15 May 2018	DF	(Switzerland)	Jasper van der Werff	St. Gallen	Undisclosed	
4 June 2018	FW	(Germany)	Kilian Ludewig	Leipzig U19	Undisclosed	
15 June 2018	DF	(Cameroon)	Jérôme Onguéné	Jérôme Onguéné	Undisclosed	
6 July 2018	GK	(Switzerland)	Philipp Köhn	RB Leipzig	Undisclosed	
10 July 2018	DF	(Bosnia and Herzegovina)	Darko Todorović	Sloboda Tuzla	Undisclosed	
26 July 2018	MF	(Mali)	Ousmane Diakité	Yeelen Olympique	Undisclosed	
19 August 2018 (Note: The transfer of Haaland was announced prior to the completion of the transfer. The player officially joined the club on 1 January 2019.)	FW	(Norway)	Erling Haaland	Molde	Undisclosed	
18 January 2019	DF	(Austria)	Albert Vallci	Wacker Innsbruck	Undisclosed	
6 February 2019	MF	(France)	Antoine Bernède	Paris Saint-Germain	Undisclosed	

=== Out ===
Date	Position	Nationality	Name	To	Fee	Ref.
29 May 2018	GK	(Poland)	Bartłomiej Żynel	Wisła Płock	Undisclosed	
8 July 2018	MF	(Kosovo)	Valon Berisha	Lazio	Undisclosed	
20 July 2018	DF	(Croatia)	Duje Ćaleta-Car	Marseille	Undisclosed	
	FW	(Austria)	Marco Djuricin	Grasshoppers	Undisclosed	
22 December 2018†	MF	(Mali)	Amadou Haidara	RB Leipzig	Undisclosed	
11 January 2019	MF	(Germany)	Reinhold Yabo	Arminia Bielefeld	Undisclosed	
17 January 2019††	FW	(Israel)	Mu'nas Dabbur	Sevilla	Undisclosed	
23 January 2019††	MF	(Austria)	Hannes Wolf	RB Leipzig	Undisclosed	
January 2019	MF	(Austria)	Romano Schmid	Werder Bremen	Undisclosed	

† Haidara's move was announced on the above date, but was not official until 1 January 2019.
†† Dabbur and Wolf's moves were announced on the above dates, but were not official until 1 July 2019.

=== Loans out ===
Start date	Position	Nationality	Name	To	End date	Ref.
19 June 2018	FW	(Germany)	Mërgim Berisha	1. FC Magdeburg	10 January 2019	
21 June 2018	DF	(Austria)	Luca Meisl	SKN St. Pölten	End of Season	
27 June 2018	MF	(Ghana)	Majeed Ashimeru	St. Gallen	End of Season	
30 June 2018	FW	(Ghana)	David Atanga	SpVgg Greuther Fürth	End of Season	
2 July 2018	DF	(Brazil)	Igor	Austria Wien	End of Season	
3 July 2018	MF	(Mali)	Youba Diarra	TSV Hartberg	8 January 2019	
16 July 2018	MF	(Austria)	Mathias Honsak	Holstein Kiel	End of Season	
31 August 2018	FW	(South Korea)	Hwang Hee-chan	Hamburger SV	End of Season	
8 January 2019	MF	(Mali)	Mohamed Camara	TSV Hartberg	End of Season	
8 January 2019	FW	(Mali)	Sékou Koïta	Wolfsberger AC	End of Season	
10 January 2019	FW	(Germany)	Mërgim Berisha	SCR Altach	End of 2019/20 Season	
21 January 2019	DF	(Ghana)	Gideon Mensah	Sturm Graz	End of Season	
24 January 2019	GK	(Brazil)	Carlos Miguel Coronel	Philadelphia Union	31 December 2019	
31 January 2019	MF	(France)	Mahamadou Dembélé	Fortuna Sittard	End of Season	

=== Released ===
Date	Position	Nationality	Name	Joined	Date
30 June 2018	DF	(Austria)	Stefan Stangl	Slovan Bratislava	23 February 2019
24 January 2019	GK	(Brazil)	Airton	Pelotas	
24 January 2019	GK	(Germany)	Marc Rzatkowski	New York Red Bulls	24 January 2019

== Friendlies ==
18 January 2019	Red Bull Salzburg	8–2	USK Anif	Salzburg
16:00 CET (UTC+1)	Daka 14', 36'; Prevljak 27' (pen.); Lainer 30'; Dabbur 47'; Gulbrandsen 53', 83'; Haaland 79'	Report	Bann 32'; Sommer 44'	Stadium: Training Centre

22 January 2019	Red Bull Salzburg	3–2	Blau-Weiß Linz	Salzburg
14:00 CET (UTC+1)	Haaland 9'; Dabbur 63'; Schlager 68'	Report	Canillas 38'; Alan 65'	Stadium: Training Centre

27 January 2019	Red Bull Salzburg	1–0	Slavia Prague	Portugal
16:00 CET (UTC+1)	Daka 65'	Report

1 February 2019	Red Bull Salzburg	2–0	Beijing Sinobo Guoan	Portugal
13:00 CET (UTC+1)	Gulbrandsen 34'; Haaland 80'	Report

8 February 2019	Red Bull Salzburg	3–2	Vorwärts Steyr	Portugal
13:00 CET (UTC+1)	Mwepu 16'; Leitgeb 35'; Prevljak 74'	Report	S. Gasperlmair 6'; C. Lichtenberger 23'

== Competitions ==
=== Bundesliga ===
==== League table ====
Pos	Team	Pld	W	D	L	GF	GA	GD	Pts	Qualification
1	Red Bull Salzburg	22	17	4	1	51	18	+33	55	Qualification for the Championship round
2	LASK	22	13	7	2	40	19	+21	46	Qualification for the Championship round
3	Sturm Graz	22	7	10	5	26	23	+3	31	Qualification for the Championship round
4	Wolfsberger AC	22	7	9	6	32	31	+1	30	Qualification for the Championship round
5	Austria Wien	22	9	3	10	29	28	+1	30	Qualification for the Championship round

Source: Austrian Football Bundesliga
Rules for classification: 1) Points; 2) Goal difference; 3) Goals scored; 4) Matches won; 5) Away matches won; 6) Head-to-head points; 7) Head-to-head goal difference; 8) Head-to-head goals scored.

==== Regular stage ====
===== Results summary =====
Overall								Home						Away					
Pld	W	D	L	GF	GA	GD	Pts	W	D	L	GF	GA	GD	W	D	L	GF	GA	GD
22	17	4	1	51	18	+33	55	9	2	0	24	6	+18	8	2	1	27	12	+15

===== Results by round =====
Round	1	2	3	4	5	6	7	8	9	10	11	12	13	14	15	16	17	18	19	20	21	22
Ground	H	A	H	H	A	H	A	H	A	A	H	A	H	A	A	H	A	H	A	H	H	A
Result	W	W	W	W	W	W	W	W	W	W	D	D	W	W	W	W	D	W	L	W	D	W
Position	1	1	1	1	1	1	1	1	1	1	1	1	1	1	1	1	1	1	1	1	1	1

Updated to match(es) played on 17 March 2019. Source: See Results
A = Away; H = Home; W = Win; D = Draw; L = Loss

===== Results =====
29 July 2018 1	Red Bull Salzburg	3–1	LASK	Wals-Siezenheim
17:00 CEST (UTC+2)	Schlager 22' (o.g.); Haidara (yellow card) 28'; Dabbur 31', 38'	Report	Ranftl (yellow card) 43'; Ullmann 69' (pen.); Pogatetz (yellow card) 73'; Trauner (yellow card) 83'; Holland (yellow card) 90+3'	Stadium: Red Bull Arena; Attendance: 11,332; Referee: Harald Lechner

4 August 2018 2	SV Mattersburg	0–2	Red Bull Salzburg	Mattersburg
17:00 CEST (UTC+2)	Salomon (yellow card) 89'; Kvasina (yellow card) 90'	Report	Wolf (yellow card) 72'; Minamino (yellow card) 89'; Ramalho 90+3'; Dabbur 90+5'	Stadium: Pappelstadion; Attendance: 2,696; Referee: Julian Weinberger

11 August 2018 3	Red Bull Salzburg	2–0	Austria Wien	Wals-Siezenheim
17:00 CEST (UTC+2)	Daka 38'; Haidara (yellow card) 41'; Dabbur 77'	Report	Grünwald (yellow card) 15'; Edomwonyi (yellow card) 53'; Ebner (yellow card) 57'	Stadium: Red Bull Arena; Attendance: 10,734; Referee: Manuel Schüttengruber

18 August 2018 4	Red Bull Salzburg	2–0	TSV Hartberg	Wals-Siezenheim
17:00 CEST (UTC+2)	Prevljak 49', 59'	Report		Stadium: Red Bull Arena; Attendance: 7,600; Referee: Oliver Drachta

25 August 2018 5	Rheindorf Altach	2–3	Red Bull Salzburg	Altach
17:00 CEST (UTC+2)	Fischer 10'; Dobras 58'	Report	Prevljak 4', 21'; Schlager 83'	Stadium: Stadion Schnabelholz; Attendance: 4,125; Referee: Walter Altmann

2 September 2018 6	Red Bull Salzburg	3–1	Admira Wacker Mödling	Wals-Siezenheim
17:00 CEST (UTC+2)	Minamino 44'; Lainer (yellow card) 49'; Mwepu 60'; Haidara 88'	Report	Vorsager (yellow card) 31', (goal) 68'; Jakoliš (yellow card) 49'	Stadium: Red Bull Arena; Attendance: 6,489; Referee: Robert Schörgenhofer

15 September 2018 7	SKN St. Pölten	1–3	Red Bull Salzburg	Sankt Pölten
17:00 CEST (UTC+2)	Ingolitsch (yellow card) 22'; Pongračić 25' (o.g.); Gartler (yellow card) 77'; Haas (yellow card) 80'	Report	Schlager 45'; Wolf 66'; Ramalho (yellow card) 77'; Samassékou (yellow card) 80'; Pongračić (yellow card) 88'; Mwepu (yellow card) 90+1'; Gulbrandsen 90+7'	Stadium: NV Arena; Attendance: 5,511; Referee: Andreas Heiß

23 September 2018 8	Red Bull Salzburg	2–1	Rapid Wien	Wals-Siezenheim
17:00 CEST (UTC+2)	Minamino 36'; Dabbur 76'	Report	Hofmann 89'	Stadium: Red Bull Arena; Attendance: 15,973; Referee: Alexander Harkam

29 September 2018 9	Wolfsberger AC	1–4	Red Bull Salzburg	Wolfsberg
17:00 CEST (UTC+2)	Kofler (red card) 20'; Rnić (yellow card) 53'; Ritzmaier (yellow card) 66'; Orgill 72'	Report	Junuzović 47'; Dabbur 55', 90+4'; Samassékou (yellow card) 75'; Yabo 90+5'	Stadium: Lavanttal-Arena; Attendance: 4,655; Referee: Manuel Schüttengruber

7 October 2018 10	Sturm Graz	1–2	Red Bull Salzburg	Graz
17:00 CEST (UTC+2)	Žulj 43'	Report	Gulbrandsen 28'; Daka (yellow card) 42'; Lainer 53'; Samassékou (yellow card) 77'; Stankovic (yellow card) 90+5'	Stadium: Liebenauer Stadium; Attendance: 12,595; Referee: Julian Weinberger

20 October 2018 11	Red Bull Salzburg	1–1	Wacker Innsbruck	Wals-Siezenheim
17:00 CEST (UTC+2)	Junuzović (yellow card) 65', (goal) 71'	Report	Kerschbaum (yellow card) 55'; Dieng 73', (yellow card) 76'; Hankič (yellow card) 90+5'	Stadium: Red Bull Arena; Attendance: 11,033; Referee: Harald Lechner

28 October 2018 12	LASK	3–3	Red Bull Salzburg	Pasching
17:00 CET (UTC+1)	Trauner 30', (yellow card) 90+3'; Goiginger 45'; Otubanjo 58'; Holland (yellow card) 75'; Michorl (yellow card) 77'	Report	Dabbur 12' (pen.), (yellow card) 90+4'; Haidara 27'; Onguéné (yellow card) 57'; Prevljak 84', (yellow card) 85'; Pongračić (red card) 90+5'	Stadium: Waldstadion; Attendance: 6,009; Referee: Gerhard Grobelnik

4 November 2018 13	Red Bull Salzburg	2–1	SV Mattersburg	Wals-Siezenheim
14:30 CET (UTC+1)	Ulmer (yellow card) 61'; Onguéné 69'; Wolf 90+2', (yellow card) 90+2'; Gulbrandsen (yellow card) 90+4'	Report	Jano (yellow card) 60'; Kvasina 87'	Stadium: Red Bull Arena; Attendance: 8,652; Referee: René Eisner

11 November 2018 14	Austria Wien	0–2	Red Bull Salzburg	Vienna
17:00 CET (UTC+1)	Monschein (yellow card) 11'	Report	Ramalho (yellow card) 21'; Junuzović (yellow card) 77'; Schlager (yellow card) 82', (goal) 86'; Minamino (yellow card) 88', (goal) 90+4'	Stadium: Franz Horr Stadium; Attendance: 10,507; Referee: Robert Schörgenhofer

24 November 2018 15	TSV Hartberg	0–4	Red Bull Salzburg	Hartberg
17:00 CET (UTC+1)	Siegl (yellow card) 61'; Swete (yellow card) 90+3'	Report	Samassékou 49'; Gulbrandsen (yellow card) 61'; Wolf 63'; Schlager 88'; Junuzović 90+2'	Stadium: Profertil Arena Hartberg; Attendance: 4,860; Referee: Dominik Ouschan

2 December 2018 16	Red Bull Salzburg	1–0	Rheindorf Altach	Wals-Siezenheim
14:30 CET (UTC+1)	Minamino 18'; Ramalho (yellow card) 74'	Report	Müller (yellow card) 36'; Karic (yellow card) 72'	Stadium: Red Bull Arena; Attendance: 5,797; Referee: Alexander Harkam

8 December 2018 17	Admira Wacker Mödling	2–2	Red Bull Salzburg	Maria Enzersdorf
17:00 CET (UTC+1)	Schmidt 36', 46'; Maier (yellow card) 53'; Thoelke (yellow card) 62'; Zwierschitz (yellow card) 79'; Vorsager (yellow card) 85'	Report	Dabbur 5'; Wolf 69'	Stadium: Bundesstadion Südstadt; Attendance: 1,900; Referee: Petru Ciochirca

16 December 2018 18	Red Bull Salzburg	5–1	SKN St. Pölten	Wals-Siezenheim
14:30 CET (UTC+1)	Prevljak 3', 9', 24', 41'; Junuzovic 30'	Report	Ouedraogo 80'; Fountas (yellow card) 87'	Stadium: Red Bull Arena; Attendance: 5,727; Referee: Manuel Schüttengruber

24 February 2019 19	Rapid Wien	2–0	Red Bull Salzburg	Vienna
17:00 CET (UTC+1)	Hofmann (yellow card) 12'; Martic (yellow card) 40'; Auer (yellow card) 63'; Berisha 65'; Schwab 81', (yellow card) 84'	Report	Ramalho (yellow card) 50' (yellow-red card) 54'	Stadium: Allianz Stadion; Attendance: 19,440; Referee: Robert Schörgenhofer

2 March 2019 20	Red Bull Salzburg	3–0	Wolfsberger AC	Wals-Siezenheim
17:00 CET (UTC+1)	Dabbur 4', 68'; Wolf 29'	Report	Sprangler (yellow card) 58'	Stadium: Red Bull Arena; Attendance: 5,911; Referee: René Eisner

10 March 2019 21	Red Bull Salzburg	0–0	Sturm Graz	Wals-Siezenheim
17:00 CET (UTC+1)	Dabbur (penalty missed) 74'	Report	Lovrić (yellow card) 53'; Hierländer (yellow card) 73'	Stadium: Red Bull Arena; Attendance: 10,142; Referee: Oliver Drachta

17 March 2019 22	Wacker Innsbruck	0–2	Red Bull Salzburg	Innsbruck
17:00 CET (UTC+1)	Kerschbaum (yellow card) 27'; Klem (yellow card) 63'; Freitag (yellow card) 74'	Report	Dabbur 21'; Samassékou (yellow card) 34'; Szoboszlai 90+1'	Stadium: Tivoli-Neu; Attendance: 5,357; Referee: Harald Lechner

==== Championship stage ====
===== Results summary =====
Overall								Home						Away					
Pld	W	D	L	GF	GA	GD	Pts	W	D	L	GF	GA	GD	W	D	L	GF	GA	GD
10	8	1	1	28	9	+19	25	5	0	0	20	4	+16	3	1	1	8	5	+3

Last updated: 26 May 2019.
Source: See Results

===== Results by round =====
Round	1	2	3	4	5	6	7	8	9	10
Ground	H	A	H	A	H	A	A	H	A	H
Result	W	W	W	D	W	L	W	W	W	W
Position	1	1	1	1	1	1	1	1	1	1

Source: See results
A = Away; H = Home; W = Win; D = Draw; L = Loss

===== Results =====
31 March 2019 1	Red Bull Salzburg	5–1	Austria Wien	Wals-Siezenheim
17:00 CEST (UTC+2)	Dabbur 34', 75', 86', 90+1', (penalty missed) 75'; Minamino 47'	Report	Schoissengeyr (yellow card) 11'; Sax 41' (pen.), (yellow card) 57'	Stadium: Red Bull Arena; Attendance: 10,228; Referee: Oliver Drachta

7 April 2019 2	LASK	0–2	Red Bull Salzburg	Pasching
17:00 CEST (UTC+2)	Wiesinger (yellow card) 84'	Report	Gulbrandsen 19'; Junuzović (yellow card) 37'; Minamino (yellow card) 40'; Samassékou (yellow card) 45+1'; Schlager (yellow card) 68'; Lainer (yellow card) 79'; Daka 90+1', (yellow card) 90+2'	Stadium: Waldstadion; Attendance: 6,087; Referee: Alexander Harkam

14 April 2019 3	Red Bull Salzburg	3–1	Sturm Graz	Wals-Siezenheim
17:00 CEST (UTC+2)	Onguéné (yellow card) 35'; Gulbrandsen 53'; Dabbur 67', (yellow card) 87'; Szoboszlai 71'	Report	Mensah (yellow card) 25'; Domínguez (yellow card) 38'; Lema 40'; Spendlhofer (yellow card) 63'; Koch (yellow card) 76'	Stadium: Red Bull Arena; Attendance: 11,133; Referee: Julian Weinberger

21 April 2019 4	St. Pölten	1–1	Red Bull Salzburg	Sankt Pölten
14:30 CEST (UTC+2)	Luxbacher (yellow card) 16'; Rasner (yellow card) 19'; Gartler (yellow card) 37', (goal) 65' (pen.); Vucenovic (yellow card) 90+2'	Report	Ulmer (red card) 3'; Prevljak 33' (pen.); Schlager (yellow card) 69'	Stadium: NV Arena; Attendance: 3,514; Referee: Gerhard Grobelnik

24 April 2019 5	Red Bull Salzburg	3–1	Wolfsberger AC	Wals-Siezenheim
19:00 CEST (UTC+2)	Onguéné (yellow card) 43', (goal) 87'; Samassékou (yellow card) 58'; Dabbur 89'; Minamino 90+4'	Report	Wernitznig (yellow card) 54'; Koïta 55'; Novak (yellow card) 70'	Stadium: Red Bull Arena; Attendance: 6,181; Referee: Andreas Heiß

28 April 2019 6	Wolfsberger AC	2–1	Red Bull Salzburg	Wolfsberg
14:30 CEST (UTC+2)	Ritzmaier (yellow card) 30', (goal) 72'; Friesenbichler 35'; Leitgeb (yellow card) 52'; Sollbauer (yellow card) 58'	Report	Junuzović (yellow card) 46'; Gulbrandsen 66'; Szoboszlai (yellow card) 90+1'	Stadium: Lavanttal-Arena; Attendance: 3,409; Referee: Markus Hameter

5 May 2019 7	Austria Wien	1–2	Red Bull Salzburg	Vienna
17:00 CEST (UTC+2)	Demaku (yellow card) 11'; Igor (yellow card) 38'; Grünwald (yellow card) 60'; Prokop 71'; Madl (yellow card) 90+4'	Report	Schlager 81'; Wolf 86'	Stadium: Franz Horr Stadium; Attendance: 9,578; Referee: Alexander Harkam

12 May 2019 8	Red Bull Salzburg	2–1	LASK	Wals-Siezenheim
17:00 CEST (UTC+2)	Haaland 13'; Gulbrandsen 37'	Report	Trauner 49'; Wiesinger (yellow card) 64'	Stadium: Red Bull Arena; Attendance: 11,257; Referee: René Eisner

19 May 2019 9	Sturm Graz	1–2	Red Bull Salzburg	Graz
17:00 CEST (UTC+2)	Kiteishvili 27'; Lema (yellow card) 55'; Mensah (yellow card) 69'; Hierländer (yellow card) 79'; Spendlhofer (yellow card) 90+3'; Maresic (yellow card) 90+5'	Report	Daka 10'; Ramalho (yellow card) 38'; Junuzović (yellow card) 47'; Szoboszlai 65'; Vallci (yellow card) 78'	Stadium: Liebenauer Stadium; Attendance: 11,486; Referee: Harald Lechner

26 May 2019 10	Red Bull Salzburg	7–0	St. Pölten	Wals-Siezenheim
17:00 CEST (UTC+2)	Dabbur 9', 47'; Vallci 36'; Gulbrandsen 56'; Wolf 67', 87'; Onguéné 82'	Report	Petrovic (yellow card) 86'	Stadium: Red Bull Arena; Attendance: 16,200; Referee: Josef Spurny

===== League table =====
Pos	Team	Pld	W	D	L	GF	GA	GD	Pts	Qualification
1	Red Bull Salzburg (C)	32	25	5	2	79	27	+52	52	Qualification for the Champions League group stage
2	LASK	32	18	9	5	59	31	+28	40	Qualification for the Champions League third qualifying round
3	Wolfsberger AC	32	12	10	10	47	47	0	31	Qualification for the Europa League group stage
4	Austria Wien	32	12	6	14	45	48	−3	27	Qualification for the Europa League third qualifying round
5	Sturm Graz (O)	32	10	10	12	37	40	−3	24	Qualification for the Europa League play-off final
6	St. Pölten	32	9	9	14	32	50	−18	21	

Source: Austrian Football Bundesliga
Rules for classification: 1) Points; 2) Points with (possible) half points subtracted due to rounding; 3) Goal difference; 4) Goals scored; 5) Matches won; 6) Away matches won; 7) Head-to-head points; 8) Head-to-head goal difference; 9) Head-to-head goals scored.
(C) Champions; (O) Play-off winners

=== Austrian Cup ===
22 July 2018 First round	ASKÖ Oedt	0–6	Red Bull Salzburg	Oedt
17:15 CEST (UTC+2)	G. Schneider (yellow card) 26'; P. Haslgruber (yellow card) 47'	Report	Schlager 10', 65'; Yabo 45', 63'; Prevljak 73'; Dabbur 78' (pen.); Pongračić (yellow card) 86'	Stadium: Transdanubia Sportanlage; Attendance: 2,112; Referee: Petru Ciochirca

24 September 2018 Second round	Schwaz	0–6	Red Bull Salzburg	Schwaz
20:30 CEST (UTC+2)	M. Wurm (yellow card) 23'; M. Wildauer (yellow card) 40'	Report	Minamino 28'; Prevljak 39'; Mwepu 63'; Szoboszlai 69'; Junuzović 81'; Leitgeb 87'	Stadium: Silberstadt Arena Schwaz; Attendance: 1,300; Referee: Robert Schörgenhofer

31 October 2018 Third round	Austria Lustenau	0–1	Red Bull Salzburg	Lustenau
18:30 CET (UTC+1)	Djurić (yellow card) 71'; D. Grujcic (yellow card) 86'	Report	Onguéné (yellow card) 68'; Minamino 74'	Stadium: Reichshofstadion; Attendance: 3,500; Referee: Walter Altmann

17 February 2019 Quarter-finals	Wiener Neustadt	1–2	Red Bull Salzburg	Wiener Neustadt
15:00 CET (UTC+1)	J. Tartarotti (yellow card) 52'; Hager 89'	Report	Szoboszlai 48'; Dabbur 55'; Samassékou (yellow card) 59'; Prevljak (yellow card) 90+2'; Ramalho (yellow card) 90+3'	Stadium: Stadion Wiener Neustadt; Attendance: 2,170; Referee: Chiristian Ciochirca

2 April 2019 Semi-finals	Grazer AK	0–6	Red Bull Salzburg	Graz
18:00 CEST (UTC+2)		Report	Dabbur 6', 26'; Wolf 13', 66'; Minamino 45'; Daka 90+2'	Stadium: Merkur Arena; Attendance: 13,301; Referee: Gerhard Grobelnik

1 May 2019 Final	Red Bull Salzburg	2–0	Rapid Wien	Klagenfurt
16:30 CEST (UTC+2)	Farkas 37', (yellow card) 45+3' (yellow-red card) 83'; Dabbur 39', (yellow card) 90+6'; Gulbrandsen (yellow card) 74'; Walke (yellow card) 90+2'	Report	Müldür (yellow card) 61'; Hofmann (yellow card) 90+6'	Stadium: Wörthersee Stadion; Attendance: 24,200; Referee: Manuel Schüttengruber

=== UEFA Champions League ===
==== Qualifying rounds ====
8 August 2018 Third Qualifying Round 1st Leg	Red Bull Salzburg (Austria)	3–0	(North Macedonia) Shkëndija	Wals-Siezenheim, Austria
19:00 CEST (UTC+2)	Dabbur 16' (pen.), 45+3'; Junuzović (yellow card) 19' (yellow-red card) 83'; Samassékou 81' (pen.)	Report	Murati (yellow card) 28'; Nafiu (yellow card) 90+8'	Stadium: Red Bull Arena; Attendance: 10,050; Referee: Aliyar Aghayev (Azerbaijan)

14 August 2018 Third Qualifying Round 2nd Leg	Shkëndija (North Macedonia)	0–1 (0–4 agg.)	(Austria) Red Bull Salzburg	Skopje, Republic of Macedonia
20:15 CEST (UTC+2)	Adili (yellow card) 33'; E. Bejtullai (yellow card) 73'; Musliu (yellow card) 90'	Report	Dabbur (yellow card) 61'; Schlager (yellow card) 61'; Samassékou (yellow card) 81'; Minamino 90+2'	Stadium: Philip II Arena; Attendance: 3,213; Referee: Tamás Bognár (Hungary)
Note: Shkëndija played their home matches at Philip II Arena, Skopje, instead of their regular stadium Ecolog Arena, Tetovo, due to renovation.

21 August 2018 Playoff Round 1st Leg	Red Star Belgrade (Serbia)	0–0	(Austria) Red Bull Salzburg	Belgrade, Serbia
21:00 CEST (UTC+2)		Report	Haidara (yellow card) 55'; Minamino (yellow card) 90'; Dabbur (yellow card) 90+4'	Stadium: Red Star Stadium; Attendance: 0 Referee: Daniele Orsato (Italy)
Note: The Red Star Belgrade v Red Bull Salzburg match was played behind closed doors due to punishment by UEFA.

29 August 2018 Playoff Round 2nd Leg	Red Bull Salzburg (Austria)	2–2 (2–2 (a) agg.)	(Serbia) Red Star Belgrade	Wals-Siezenheim, Austria
21:00 CEST (UTC+2)	Dabbur 45', 48' (pen.), (yellow card) 90+4'; Pongračić (yellow card) 63'; Schlager (yellow card) 81'	Report	Krstičić (yellow card) 63'; Ben Nabouhane 65', 66'; Stojković (yellow card) 75'; Pavkov (yellow card) 89'	Stadium: Red Bull Arena; Attendance: 26,500; Referee: Cüneyt Çakır (Turkey)

=== UEFA Europa League ===
==== Group stage ====
Pos	Team	Pld	W	D	L	GF	GA	GD	Pts	Qualification
1	(Austria) Red Bull Salzburg	6	6	0	0	17	6	+11	18	Advance to knockout phase
2	(Scotland) Celtic	6	3	0	3	6	8	−2	9	Advance to knockout phase
3	(Germany) RB Leipzig	6	2	1	3	9	8	+1	7	
4	(Norway) Rosenborg	6	0	1	5	4	14	−10	1	

Source: UEFA
Rules for classification: Group stage tiebreakers

20 September 2018 1	RB Leipzig (Germany)	2–3	(Austria) Red Bull Salzburg	Leipzig, Germany
21:00 CEST (UTC+02:00)	Laimer 70'; Poulsen 82', (yellow card) 85'	Report	Dabbur 20'; Haidara 22', (yellow card) 79'; Schlager (yellow card) 29'; Gulbrandsen 89'; Pongračić (yellow card) 90+3'	Stadium: Red Bull Arena; Attendance: 24,057; Referee: Andreas Ekberg (Sweden)

4 October 2018 2	Red Bull Salzburg (Austria)	3–1	(Scotland) Celtic	Salzburg, Austria
18:55 CEST (UTC+02:00)	Dabbur (yellow card) 51', (goal) 55', 73' (pen.); Minamino 61'	Report	Édouard 2'; McGregor (yellow card) 39'; Hendry (yellow card) 43'; Mulumbu (yellow card) 57'; Forrest (red card) 72'	Stadium: Red Bull Arena; Attendance: 24,085; Referee: Serhiy Boyko (Ukraine)

25 October 2018 3	Red Bull Salzburg (Austria)	3–0	(Norway) Rosenborg	Salzburg, Austria
18:55 CEST (UTC+02:00)	Dabbur 34', 59' (pen.); Wolf 53'; Ramalho (yellow card) 84'	Report	Šerbečić (yellow card) 14'; Jensen (yellow card) 67'	Stadium: Red Bull Arena; Attendance: 20,639; Referee: Irfan Peljto (Bosnia and Herzegovina)

8 November 2018 4	Rosenborg (Norway)	2–5	(Austria) Red Bull Salzburg	Trondheim, Norway
21:00 CET (UTC+01:00)	Adegbenro 52'; Jensen 62'	Report	Minamino 6', 19', 45'; Gulbrandsen 37'; Hovland 57' (o.g.); Samassékou (yellow card) 61'; Dabbur (yellow card) 80'; Schlager (yellow card) 86'	Stadium: Lerkendal Stadion; Attendance: 12,386; Referee: Aleksei Eskov (Russia)

29 November 2018 5	Red Bull Salzburg (Austria)	1–0	(Germany) RB Leipzig	Salzburg, Austria
18:55 CET (UTC+01:00)	Lainer (yellow card) 31'; Gulbrandsen 74'; Schlager (yellow card) 90+3'	Report	Ilsanker (yellow card) 3'; Bruma (yellow card) 10'; Cunha (yellow card) 49'	Stadium: Red Bull Arena; Attendance: 29,520; Referee: Orel Grinfeld (Israel)

13 December 2018 6	Celtic (Scotland)	1–2	(Austria) Red Bull Salzburg	Glasgow, Scotland
21:00 CET (UTC+01:00)	Benković (yellow card) 88'; Ntcham (penalty missed) 90+5' 90+5'	Report	Onguéné (yellow card) 19'; Dabbur 67'; Gulbrandsen 78'; Ramalho (yellow card) 87'	Stadium: Celtic Park; Attendance: 57,578; Referee: Ruddy Buquet (France)

==== Knockout phase ====
14 February 2019 Round of 32 1st Leg	Club Brugge (Belgium)	2–1	(Austria) Red Bull Salzburg	Bruges, Belgium
21:00 CET (UTC+01:00)	Vormer (yellow card) 40'; Vanaken (yellow card) 43'; Denswil 64'; Wesley 81', (yellow card) 84'	Report	Junuzović 17'; Schlager (yellow card) 39'; Ramalho (yellow card) 55'; Ulmer (yellow card) 62'; Lainer (yellow card) 84'	Stadium: Jan Breydel Stadium; Attendance: 16,457; Referee: Georgi Kabakov (Bulgaria)

21 February 2019 Round of 32 2nd Leg	Red Bull Salzburg (Austria)	4–0 (5–2 agg.)	(Belgium) Club Brugge	Salzburg, Austria
18:55 CET (UTC+01:00)	Schlager 17'; Daka 29', 43'; Samassékou (yellow card) 49'; Vallci (yellow card) 88'; Dabbur (penalty missed) 11', 90+4'	Report	Horvath (yellow card) 10'; Denswil (yellow card) 39'; Vanaken (yellow card) 39'; Dennis (yellow card) 82'	Stadium: Red Bull Arena; Attendance: 24,717; Referee: Daniel Siebert (Germany)

7 March 2019 Round of 16 1st Leg	Napoli (Italy)	3–0	(Austria) Red Bull Salzburg	Naples, Italy
21:00 CET (UTC+01:00)	Milik 10'; Fabián 18'; Koulibaly (yellow card) 26'; Onguéné 58' (o.g.); Maksimović (yellow card) 83'; Ounas (yellow card) 86'	Report	Schlager (yellow card) 54'	Stadium: Stadio San Paolo; Attendance: 32,579; Referee: Aleksei Kulbakov (Belarus)

14 March 2019 Round of 16 2nd Leg	Red Bull Salzburg (Austria)	3–1 (3–4 agg.)	(Italy) Napoli	Salzburg, Austria
18:55 CET (UTC+01:00)	Dabbur 25'; Onguéné (yellow card) 42'; Samassékou (yellow card) 56'; Gulbrandsen 65'; Leitgeb 90+1'	Report	Milik 14', (yellow card) 44'	Stadium: Red Bull Arena; Attendance: 29,520; Referee: Carlos del Cerro Grande (Spain)

== Statistics ==
As of match played 26 May 2019

=== Appearances and goals ===
No.	Pos	Nat	Player	Total		Bundesliga		Austrian Cup		UEFA Champions League		UEFA Europa League	
No.	Pos	Nat	Player	Apps	Goals	Apps	Goals	Apps	Goals	Apps	Goals	Apps	Goals
1	GK	(Austria) AUT	Cican Stankovic	33	0	28	0	1	0	4	0	0	0
3	DF	(Austria) AUT	Jasper van der Werff	5	0	3+1	0	1	0	0	0	0	0
5	DF	(Austria) AUT	Albert Vallci	12	1	9+1	1	1	0	0	0	0+1	0
6	DF	(Cameroon) CMR	Jérôme Onguéné	22	3	12+1	3	4	0	0	0	5	0
8	MF	(Mali) MLI	Diadie Samassékou	45	2	26	1	5	0	4	1	10	0
9	FW	(Israel) ISR	Mu'nas Dabbur	48	37	23+6	20	4+1	5	4	4	10	8
11	FW	(Bosnia and Herzegovina) BIH	Smail Prevljak	32	12	11+12	10	3+1	2	0+1	0	0+4	0
13	MF	(Austria) AUT	Hannes Wolf	40	11	15+7	8	3+1	2	4	0	9+1	1
14	MF	(Hungary) HUN	Dominik Szoboszlai	20	5	7+9	3	1+2	2	0	0	1	0
15	DF	(Brazil) BRA	André Ramalho	45	1	27	1	4+1	0	4	0	9	0
16	MF	(Austria) AUT	Zlatko Junuzović	35	6	18+3	4	3+1	1	2	0	6+2	1
17	DF	(Austria) AUT	Andreas Ulmer	47	0	28	0	5	0	4	0	10	0
18	FW	(Japan) JPN	Takumi Minamino	45	14	19+8	6	4+1	3	0+3	1	4+6	4
20	FW	(Zambia) ZAM	Patson Daka	26	6	9+6	3	0+3	1	1+3	0	2+2	2
21	FW	(Norway) NOR	Fredrik Gulbrandsen	35	12	14+9	7	1+2	0	0	0	4+5	5
22	DF	(Austria) AUT	Stefan Lainer	43	1	25	1	3+1	0	4	0	10	0
24	MF	(Austria) AUT	Christoph Leitgeb	11	2	1+4	0	2	1	0+1	0	0+3	1
25	DF	(Austria) AUT	Patrick Farkas	4	1	1+2	0	1	1	0	0	0	0
28	MF	(France) FRA	Antoine Bernède	3	0	1+2	0	0	0	0	0	0	0
30	FW	(Norway) NOR	Erling Haaland	5	1	1+1	1	0+2	0	0	0	0+1	0
33	GK	(Germany) GER	Alexander Walke	19	0	4	0	5	0	0	0	10	0
34	DF	(Croatia) CRO	Marin Pongračić	26	0	13+1	0	2	0	4	0	6	0
42	MF	(Austria) AUT	Xaver Schlager	43	8	23+2	5	5+1	2	3+1	0	7+1	1
45	MF	(Zambia) ZAM	Enock Mwepu	28	2	9+10	1	3	1	0+1	0	2+3	0
55	DF	(Bosnia and Herzegovina) BIH	Darko Todorović	14	0	9+3	0	2	0	0	0	0	0
Players also registered for Liefering :
Players away on loan :
Players who left Red Bull Salzburg during the season:
4	MF	(Mali) MLI	Amadou Haidara	21	3	9+3	2	1+1	0	3	0	4	1
7	MF	(Germany) GER	Reinhold Yabo	17	3	6+3	1	2	2	3+1	0	1+1	0

=== Goal scorers ===
Place	Position	Nation	Number	Name	Bundesliga	Austrian Cup	UEFA Champions League	UEFA Europa League	Total
1	FW	(Israel)	9	Mu'nas Dabbur	20	5	4	8	37
2	FW	(Japan)	18	Takumi Minamino	6	3	1	4	14
3	FW	(Bosnia and Herzegovina)	11	Smail Prevljak	10	2	0	0	12
5	MF	(Austria)	13	Hannes Wolf	8	2	0	1	11
5	FW	(Norway)	21	Fredrik Gulbrandsen	6	0	0	5	11
6	MF	(Austria)	42	Xaver Schlager	5	2	0	1	8
7	MF	(Austria)	16	Zlatko Junuzović	4	1	0	1	6
7	FW	(Zambia)	20	Patson Daka	3	1	0	2	6
9	MF	(Hungary)	14	Dominik Szoboszlai	3	2	0	0	5
10	DF	(Cameroon)	6	Jérôme Onguéné	3	0	0	0	3
10	MF	(Mali)	4	Amadou Haidara	2	0	0	1	3
10	MF	(Germany)	7	Reinhold Yabo	1	2	0	0	3
13	MF	(Zambia)	45	Enock Mwepu	1	1	0	0	2
13	MF	(Mali)	8	Diadie Samassékou	1	0	1	0	2
13	MF	(Austria)	24	Christoph Leitgeb	0	1	0	1	2
16	DF	(Brazil)	15	André Ramalho	1	0	0	0	1
16	DF	(Austria)	22	Stefan Lainer	1	0	0	0	1
16	FW	(Norway)	30	Erling Haaland	1	0	0	0	1
16	DF	(Austria)	5	Albert Vallci	1	0	0	0	1
16	DF	(Austria)	25	Patrick Farkas	0	1	0	0	1
16				Own goal	1	0	0	0	1
				TOTALS	77	22	6	24	129

=== Disciplinary record ===
Number	Nation	Position	Name	Bundesliga		Austrian Cup		UEFA Champions League		UEFA Europa League		Total	
Number	Nation	Position	Name	Yellow card	Red card	Yellow card	Red card	Yellow card	Red card	Yellow card	Red card	Yellow card	Red card
1	(Austria)	GK	Cican Stankovic	1	0	0	0	0	0	0	0	1	0
5	(Austria)	DF	Albert Vallci	1	0	0	0	0	0	1	0	2	0
6	(Cameroon)	DF	Jérôme Onguéné	3	0	1	0	0	0	2	0	6	0
8	(Mali)	MF	Diadie Samassékou	6	0	1	0	1	0	3	0	11	0
9	(Israel)	FW	Mu'nas Dabbur	2	0	1	0	3	0	2	0	8	0
11	(Bosnia and Herzegovina)	FW	Smail Prevljak	1	0	1	0	0	0	0	0	2	0
13	(Austria)	MF	Hannes Wolf	2	0	0	0	0	0	0	0	2	0
14	(Hungary)	MF	Dominik Szoboszlai	1	0	0	0	0	0	0	0	1	0
15	(Brazil)	DF	André Ramalho	6	1	1	0	0	0	3	0	10	1
16	(Austria)	MF	Zlatko Junuzović	5	0	0	0	2	1	0	0	7	1
17	(Austria)	DF	Andreas Ulmer	1	1	0	0	0	0	1	0	2	1
18	(Japan)	FW	Takumi Minamino	3	0	0	0	1	0	0	0	4	0
20	(Zambia)	FW	Patson Daka	2	0	0	0	0	0	0	0	2	0
21	(Norway)	FW	Fredrik Gulbrandsen	2	0	1	0	0	0	0	0	3	0
22	(Austria)	DF	Stefan Lainer	2	0	0	0	0	0	2	0	4	0
25	(Austria)	DF	Patrick Farkas	0	0	2	1	0	0	0	0	2	1
33	(Germany)	GK	Alexander Walke	0	0	1	0	0	0	0	0	1	0
34	(Croatia)	DF	Marin Pongračić	1	1	1	0	1	0	1	0	4	1
42	(Austria)	MF	Xaver Schlager	3	0	0	0	2	0	5	0	10	0
45	(Zambia)	MF	Enock Mwepu	1	0	0	0	0	0	0	0	1	0
Players away on loan:
Players who left Red Bull Salzburg during the season:
4	(Mali)	MF	Amadou Haidara	2	0	0	0	1	0	1	0	4	0
			TOTALS	45	3	10	1	8	1	21	0	84	5
