= 2017–18 FC Red Bull Salzburg season =

Red Bull Salzburg 2017–18 football season

Red Bull Salzburg
2017–18 season
- Chairman: Georgios Esplandatkoulos
- Manager: Marco Rose
- Stadium: Red Bull Arena
- Bundesliga: 1st
- Austrian Cup: Runners-up
- UEFA Champions League: Third qualifying round
- UEFA Europa League: Semi-finals
- Top goalscorer: League: Mu'nas Dabbur (22); All: Mu'nas Dabbur (29)
| Home colours | Away colours | Third colours |

The 2017–18 FC Red Bull Salzburg season was the 85th season in club history. They were defending League and Cup champions.

== Squad ==
As of match played 27 May 2018

| No. | Name | Nationality | Position | Date of birth (age) | Signed from | Signed in | Contract ends | Apps. | Goals |
Goalkeepers
| 1 | Cican Stankovic | (Austria) (Note: Cican Stankovic was born in Bijeljina, Bosnia and Herzegovina, but qualified to represent Austria internationally, representing the Austrian U-21 team in 2014.) | GK | 4 November 1992 (aged 25) | SV Grödig | 2015 | 2020 | 35 | 0 |
| 31 | Carlos Miguel | (Brazil) | GK | 29 December 1996 (aged 21) | Academy | 2015 | | 1 | 0 |
| 33 | Alexander Walke | (Germany) | GK | 6 June 1983 (aged 34) | Hansa Rostock | 2010 | 2017 | | |
Defenders
| 5 | Duje Ćaleta-Car | (Croatia) | DF | 17 September 1996 (aged 21) | Pasching | 2014 | 2020 | 77 | 2 |
| 6 | Jérôme Onguéné | (France) (Note: Jérôme Onguéné was born in Mbalmayo, Cameroon, but qualified to represent France internationally, representing them at youth level before making his debut for Cameroon in August 2018.) | DF | 22 December 1997 (aged 20) | loan from VfB Stuttgart | 2017 | 2018 | | |
| 15 | André Ramalho | (Brazil) | DF | 16 February 1992 (aged 26) | Bayer 04 Leverkusen | 2018 | | 117 | 12 |
| 17 | Andreas Ulmer | (Austria) | DF | 30 October 1985 (aged 32) | SV Ried | 2009 | | | |
| 22 | Stefan Lainer | (Austria) | DF | 27 August 1992 (aged 25) | SV Ried | 2015 | 2018 | 127 | 13 |
| 34 | Marin Pongračić | (Croatia) | DF | 11 September 1997 (aged 20) | 1860 Munich | 2017 | | 23 | 0 |
| 55 | Luca Meisl | (Austria) | DF | 4 March 1999 (aged 19) | Academy | 2016 | | 2 | 0 |
Midfielders
| 4 | Amadou Haidara | (Mali) | MF | 31 January 1998 (aged 20) | JMG Academy Bamako | 2016 | | 62 | 10 |
| 7 | Reinhold Yabo | (Germany) | MF | 10 February 1992 (aged 26) | Karlsruher SC | 2015 | 2018 | 43 | 5 |
| 8 | Diadie Samassékou | (Mali) | MF | 11 January 1996 (aged 22) | Real Bamako | 2015 | 2019 | 88 | 0 |
| 13 | Hannes Wolf | (Austria) | MF | 16 April 1999 (aged 19) | Academy | 2016 | | 48 | 12 |
| 14 | Valon Berisha | (Kosovo) (Note: Valon Berisha was born in Malmö, Sweden to Kosovo Albanian parents. Berisha qualified to represent Norway internationally, representing them at various levels until September 2016, when he switched to representing Kosovo.) | MF | 7 February 1993 (aged 25) | Viking | 2012 | | 234 | 45 |
| 16 | Dominik Szoboszlai | (Hungary) | DF | 25 October 2000 (aged 17) | MTK Budapest | 2016 | | 1 | 0 |
| 24 | Christoph Leitgeb | (Austria) | MF | 14 April 1985 (aged 33) | Sturm Graz | 2007 | | | |
| 25 | Patrick Farkas | (Austria) | MF | 9 September 1992 (aged 25) | SV Mattersburg | 2017 | | 22 | 2 |
| 28 | Romano Schmid | (Austria) | MF | 27 January 2000 (aged 18) | Sturm Graz | 2017 | | 1 | 0 |
| 42 | Xaver Schlager | (Austria) | MF | 28 September 1997 (aged 20) | Academy | 2015 | | 63 | 3 |
| 45 | Enock Mwepu | (Zambia) | MF | 1 January 1998 (aged 20) | Kafue Celtic | 2017 | | 10 | 1 |
Forwards
| 9 | Mu'nas Dabbur | (Israel) | FW | 14 May 1992 (aged 26) | Grasshoppers | 2016 | | 80 | 35 |
| 18 | Takumi Minamino | (Japan) | FW | 16 January 1995 (aged 23) | Cerezo Osaka | 2015 | 2018 | 132 | 41 |
| 19 | Hwang Hee-chan | (South Korea) | FW | 26 January 1996 (aged 22) | Pohang Steelers | 2015 | | 86 | 29 |
| 21 | Fredrik Gulbrandsen | (Norway) | FW | 10 September 1992 (aged 25) | Molde | 2016 | | 72 | 20 |
| 41 | Patson Daka | (Zambia) | FW | 9 October 1998 (aged 19) | Kafue Celtic | 2017 | | 12 | 1 |
Out on loan
| 11 | Marc Rzatkowski | (Germany) | MF | 2 March 1990 (aged 28) | FC St. Pauli | 2016 | | 27 | 5 |
| 20 | David Atanga | (Ghana) | FW | 25 December 1996 (aged 21) | Red Bull Ghana | 2015 | 2020 | 13 | 0 |
| 23 | Stefan Stangl | (Austria) | DF | 20 October 1991 (aged 26) | Rapid Wien | 2016 | | 13 | 1 |
| 28 | Asger Sørensen | (Denmark) | DF | 5 June 1996 (aged 21) | Academy | 2014 | | 6 | 1 |
| 29 | Samuel Tetteh | (Ghana) | FW | 28 July 1996 (aged 21) | West African Football Academy | 2016 | | 2 | 0 |
| 37 | Mërgim Berisha | (Germany) | FW | 11 May 1998 (aged 20) | Academy | 2017 | | 1 | 0 |
| 44 | Igor | (Brazil) | DF | 7 February 1998 (aged 20) | Red Bull Brasil | 2016 | | 4 | 0 |
| 77 | Dimitri Oberlin | (Switzerland) (Note: Dimitri Oberlin was born in Yaoundé, Cameroon but qualified to represent Switzerland internationally, representing them at various youth levels before making his senior debut in 2018.) | FW | 27 September 1997 (aged 20) | Zürich | 2015 | 2020 | 20 | 4 |
| | Majeed Ashimeru | (Ghana) | MF | 10 October 1997 (aged 20) | WAFA | 2017 | | 0 | 0 |
| | Smail Prevljak | (Bosnia and Herzegovina) | FW | 10 May 1995 (aged 23) | loan from RB Leipzig | 2015 | | 11 | 0 |
Left during the season
| 3 | Paulo Miranda | (Brazil) | DF | 16 August 1988 (aged 29) | São Paulo | 2015 | 2019 | 94 | 4 |
| 10 | Valentino Lazaro | (Austria) | MF | 24 March 1996 (aged 22) | Academy | 2012 | | 121 | 15 |

=== Out on loan ===
Note: Flags indicate national team as defined under FIFA eligibility rules; some limited exceptions apply. Players may hold more than one non-FIFA nationality.

| No. | Pos. | Nation | Player |
|---|---|---|---|
| 11 | MF | GER | Marc Rzatkowski (at New York Red Bulls) |
| 20 | MF | GHA | David Atanga (at St.Pölten) |
| 23 | DF | AUT | Stefan Stangl (at Austria Wien) |
| 28 | DF | DEN | Asger Sørensen (at SSV Jahn Regensburg) |
| 29 | FW | GHA | Samuel Tetteh (at LASK) |

| No. | Pos. | Nation | Player |
|---|---|---|---|
| 37 | FW | GER | Mërgim Berisha (at LASK) |
| 44 | DF | BRA | Igor (at Wolfsberger AC) |
| 77 | FW | SUI | Dimitri Oberlin (at Basel) |
| — | MF | GHA | Majeed Ashimeru (at Wolfsberger AC) |
| — | FW | BIH | Smail Prevljak (at SV Mattersburg) |

== Kits ==
| Home (Europe) | Away (Europe) |

== Transfers ==
=== In ===
| Date | Position | Nationality | Name | From | Fee | Ref. |
|---|---|---|---|---|---|---|
| 21 December 2017 | DF | (Brazil) | André Ramalho | Bayer 04 Leverkusen | Undisclosed | |
| 31 January 2018 | MF | (Mali) | Youba Diarra | Yeelen Olympique | Undisclosed | |
| January 2018 | MF | (Mali) | Mohamed Camara | | | |
| | DF | (Austria) | Patrick Farkas | SV Mattersburg | Undisclosed | |
| | DF | (Croatia) | Marin Pongračić | 1860 Munich | Undisclosed | |
| | MF | (Zambia) | Enock Mwepu | Kafue Celtic | Undisclosed | |
| | FW | (Zambia) | Patson Daka | Kafue Celtic | Undisclosed | |

=== Out ===
| Date | Position | Nationality | Name | To | Fee | Ref. |
|---|---|---|---|---|---|---|
| 30 May 2017 | DF | (Switzerland) | Christian Schwegler | Luzern | Undisclosed | |
| 7 June 2017 | MF | (Croatia) | Josip Radošević | Hajduk Split | Undisclosed | |
| 26 June 2017 | MF | (Brazil) | Wanderson | Krasnodar | Undisclosed | |
| 11 July 2017 | GK | (Ghana) | Lawrence Ati-Zigi | Sochaux | Undisclosed | |
| 21 November 2017 | MF | (Austria) | Valentino Lazaro | Hertha BSC | Undisclosed | |
| 4 January 2018 | DF | (Brazil) | Paulo Miranda | Grêmio | Undisclosed | |

=== Loans in ===
| Start date | Position | Nationality | Name | From | End date | Ref. |
|---|---|---|---|---|---|---|
| 31 August 2017 | DF | (France) | Jérôme Onguéné | VfB Stuttgart | End of Season | |

=== Loans out ===
| Start date | Position | Nationality | Name | To | End date | Ref. |
|---|---|---|---|---|---|---|
| 3 August 2017 | MF | (Austria) | Valentino Lazaro | Hertha BSC | 21 November 2017 | |
| 20 December 2017 | MF | (Ghana) | David Atanga | St.Pölten | End of Season | |
| 5 January 2018 | FW | (Ghana) | Samuel Tetteh | LASK Linz | End of 2018/19 Season | |
| 7 January 2018 | DF | (Brazil) | Igor | Wolfsberger AC | End of Season | |
| 7 January 2018 | MF | (Ghana) | Majeed Ashimeru | Wolfsberger AC | End of Season | |
| 18 January 2018 | MF | (Germany) | Marc Rzatkowski | New York Red Bulls | End of Season | |
| | DF | (Austria) | Stefan Stangl | Austria Wien | End of Season | |
| | MF | (Mali) | Youba Diarra | Wiener Neustadt | End of Season | |
| | MF | (Ghana) | Majeed Ashimeru | Austria Lustenau | 7 January 2018 | |
| | FW | (Bosnia and Herzegovina) | Smail Prevljak | Mattersburg | End of Season | |
| | DF | (Denmark) | Asger Sørensen | Jahn Regensburg | End of Season | |
| | FW | (Germany) | Mërgim Berisha | LASK Linz | End of Season | |
| | FW | (Switzerland) | Dimitri Oberlin | Basel | End of Season | |

== Competitions ==
=== Bundesliga ===
==== League table ====
| Pos | Team | Pld | W | D | L | GF | GA | GD | Pts | Qualification or relegation |
|---|---|---|---|---|---|---|---|---|---|---|
| 1 | Red Bull Salzburg (C) | 36 | 25 | 8 | 3 | 81 | 29 | +52 | 83 | Qualification for the Champions League third qualifying round |
| 2 | Sturm Graz | 36 | 22 | 4 | 10 | 68 | 45 | +23 | 70 | Qualification for the Champions League second qualifying round |
| 3 | Rapid Wien | 36 | 17 | 11 | 8 | 68 | 43 | +25 | 62 | Qualification for the Europa League third qualifying round (Note: Sturm Graz qualified for the Europa League third qualifying round by winning the 2017–18 Austrian Cup. However, since they already qualified for European competition based on their league position, the spot awarded to the cup winners was passed down the league.) |
| 4 | LASK | 36 | 17 | 6 | 13 | 49 | 41 | +8 | 57 | Qualification for the Europa League second qualifying round |
| 5 | Admira Wacker Mödling | 36 | 15 | 6 | 15 | 59 | 66 | −7 | 51 | Qualification for the Europa League second qualifying round |

Source: weltfussball.de (in German)
Rules for classification: 1) Points; 2) Goal difference; 3) Goals scored; 4) Matches won; 5) Away matches won; 6) Head-to-head points; 7) Head-to-head goal difference; 8) Head-to-head goals scored.
(C) Champions

==== Results summary ====
| Overall | | | | | | | | Home | | | | | | Away | | | | | |
| Pld | W | D | L | GF | GA | GD | Pts | W | D | L | GF | GA | GD | W | D | L | GF | GA | GD |
|---|---|---|---|---|---|---|---|---|---|---|---|---|---|---|---|---|---|---|---|
| 36 | 25 | 8 | 3 | 81 | 29 | +52 | 83 | 14 | 4 | 0 | 46 | 9 | +37 | 11 | 4 | 3 | 35 | 20 | +15 |

==== Results by round ====
| Round | 1 | 2 | 3 | 4 | 5 | 6 | 7 | 8 | 9 | 10 | 11 | 12 | 13 | 14 | 15 | 16 | 17 | 18 | 19 | 20 | 21 | 22 | 23 | 24 | 25 | 26 | 27 | 28 | 29 | 30 | 31 | 32 | 33 | 34 | 35 | 36 |
|---|---|---|---|---|---|---|---|---|---|---|---|---|---|---|---|---|---|---|---|---|---|---|---|---|---|---|---|---|---|---|---|---|---|---|---|---|
| Ground | A | H | H | A | H | A | H | A | H | H | A | A | H | A | H | A | H | A | A | H | H | A | H | A | H | A | H | H | A | A | H | A | H | A | H | A |
| Result | W | D | W | W | W | L | D | W | D | W | W | D | W | W | W | W | W | D | D | D | W | W | W | W | W | D | W | W | L | W | W | W | W | W | W | L |
| Position | 3 | 4 | 2 | 2 | 2 | 2 | 2 | 2 | 2 | 2 | 2 | 2 | 2 | 2 | 1 | 1 | 1 | 1 | 2 | 2 | 1 | 1 | 1 | 1 | 1 | 1 | 1 | 1 | 1 | 1 | 1 | 1 | 1 | 1 | 1 | 1 |

Updated to match(es) played on 27 May 2018. Source: See Results
A = Away; H = Home; W = Win; D = Draw; L = Loss

==== Results ====
| 22 July 2017 1 | Wolfsberger AC | 0–2 | Red Bull Salzburg | Wolfsberg |
| 18:30 CEST (UTC+2) | Rnić (yellow card) 61'; Wernitznig (yellow card) 81' | Report | Yabo 29'; Lainer (yellow card) 81'; Samassékou (yellow card) 88'; Minamino 90' | Stadium: Lavanttal-Arena; Attendance: 4,005; Referee: Robert Schörgenhofer |

| 29 July 2017 2 | Red Bull Salzburg | 1–1 | LASK Linz | Wals-Siezenheim |
| 16:00 CEST (UTC+2) | Hwang Hee-chan 42'; Pongračić (yellow card) 89'; Ćaleta-Car (yellow card) 90+2' | Report | Ramsebner 56' | Stadium: Red Bull Arena; Attendance: 9,927; Referee: Julian Weinberger |

| 5 August 2017 3 | Red Bull Salzburg | 5–1 | Admira Wacker Mödling | Wals-Siezenheim |
| 18:30 CEST (UTC+2) | Dabbur 9'; Wolf 29', (yellow card) 52'; Ćaleta-Car 51'; Gulbrandsen 59'; Hwang Hee-chan 76' | Report | Ebner (yellow card) 59'; Lackner (yellow card) 59'; Toth (yellow card) 63'; Zwierschitz (yellow card) 69'; Strauss (yellow card) 80'; Schmidt 90+2' | Stadium: Red Bull Arena; Attendance: 4,832; Referee: Andreas Heiß |

| 12 August 2017 4 | Rheindorf Altach | 0–1 | Red Bull Salzburg | Altach |
| 16:00 CEST (UTC+2) | Galvão (yellow card) 60' | Report | Ćaleta-Car (yellow card) 65'; Wolf 90+3' | Stadium: CASHPOINT Arena; Attendance: 5,013; Referee: Gerhard Grobelnik |

| 20 August 2017 5 | Red Bull Salzburg | 5–1 | St. Pölten | Wals-Siezenheim |
| 16:30 CEST (UTC+2) | Dabbur 31', 53'; Wolf 40'; Gulbrandsen 59', (yellow card) 87'; Hwang Hee-chan 90' | Report | Petrovic (yellow card) 33'; Rasner (yellow card) 70'; Riski 72' | Stadium: Red Bull Arena; Attendance: 5,970; Referee: Harald Lechner |

| 27 August 2017 6 | Sturm Graz | 1–0 | Red Bull Salzburg | Graz |
| 16:30 CEST (UTC+2) | Lykogiannis (yellow card) 14'; Žulj (yellow card) 33'; Alar 52'; Hierländer (yellow card) 86' | Report | Wolf (yellow card) 40'; Pongračić (yellow card) 77'; Haidara (yellow card) 89'; Ćaleta-Car (yellow card) 90+1' | Stadium: Merkur-Arena; Attendance: 15,124; Referee: Robert Schörgenhofer |

| 10 September 2017 7 | Red Bull Salzburg | 2–2 | Rapid Wien | Wals-Siezenheim |
| 16:30 CEST (UTC+2) | Haidara (yellow card) 26'; Schwab 75' (o.g.); Hwang Hee-chan (yellow card) 87'; Schlager (yellow card) 89'; Dabbur 90+2' | Report | Hofmann (yellow card) 13'; Schwab (yellow card) 16'; Pavelić (red card) 16'; Ljubicic 60'; Knoflach (yellow card) 60'; Murg (yellow card) 74'; Schobesberger 79' | Stadium: Red Bull Arena; Attendance: 12,049; Referee: Dieter Muckenhammer |

| 17 September 2017 8 | SV Mattersburg | 1–2 | Red Bull Salzburg | Mattersburg |
| 16:30 CEST (UTC+2) | Gruber 18'; Jano (yellow card) 21'; Höller (yellow card) 25'; Bürger (yellow card) 69' | Report | Dabbur 12'; Ćaleta-Car (yellow card) 23'; Gulbrandsen (yellow card) 26'; Samassékou (yellow card) 43'; Haidara 90+4' | Stadium: Pappelstadion; Attendance: 2,214; Referee: Rene Eisner |

| 24 September 2017 9 | Red Bull Salzburg | 0–0 | Austria Wien | Wals-Siezenheim |
| 16:30 CEST (UTC+2) | Haidara (yellow card) 11'; Miranda (yellow card) 74' | Report | Lee (yellow card) 27'; Holzhauser (yellow card) 72'; Friesenbichler (yellow card) 80' | Stadium: Red Bull Arena; Attendance: 7,907; Referee: Markus Hameter |

| 1 October 2017 10 | Red Bull Salzburg | 2–1 | Wolfsberger AC | Wals-Siezenheim |
| 19:00 CEST (UTC+2) | Dabbur 38', 45', (penalty missed) 60'; Va. Berisha (yellow card) 77'; Samassékou (yellow card) 87' | Report | Gschweidl 62'; Sollbauer (yellow card) 72'; Orgill (yellow card) 79'; Rnić (yellow card) 90+4' | Stadium: Red Bull Arena; Attendance: 4,512; Referee: Robert Schörgenhofer |

| 14 October 2017 11 | LASK Linz | 1–3 | Red Bull Salzburg | Pasching |
| 16:00 CEST (UTC+2) | Michorl 1'; Wiesinger (yellow card) 64'; Ranftl (yellow card) 89' | Report | Miranda (yellow card) 23'; Va. Berisha 27' (pen.); Gulbrandsen (yellow card) 59'; Ćaleta-Car (yellow card) 61'; Dabbur 74', 78', (yellow card) 90+1' | Stadium: Waldstadion; Attendance: 5,415; Referee: Harald Lechner |

| 22 October 2017 12 | Admira Wacker Mödling | 1–1 | Red Bull Salzburg | Maria Enzersdorf |
| 14:00 CEST (UTC+2) | Knasmüllner 17' (pen.) | Report | Schlager 7'; Ulmer (yellow card) 90+2' | Stadium: Bundesstadion Südstadt; Attendance: 2,302; Referee: Rene Eisner |

| 28 October 2017 13 | Red Bull Salzburg | 2–0 | Rheindorf Altach | Wals-Siezenheim |
| 18:30 CET (UTC+1) | Wolf 29'; Stankovic (yellow card) 51'; Haidara 81' | Report | Salomon (yellow card) 40'; Dobras (yellow card) 77'; Zwischenbrugger (yellow card) 85' | Stadium: Red Bull Arena; Attendance: 6,384; Referee: Manuel Schüttengruber |

| 5 November 2017 14 | St. Pölten | 1–3 | Red Bull Salzburg | Sankt Pölten |
| 16:30 CET (UTC+1) | Huber 6'; Doumbouya (penalty missed) 45+3'; Muhamedbegovic (yellow card) 51'; Rasner (yellow card) 55'; Hofbauer (yellow card) 67' | Report | Minamino 35', 80'; Onguéné (yellow card) 45+1'; Rzatkowski 54'; Farkas (yellow card) 89' | Stadium: NV Arena; Attendance: 2,760; Referee: Julian Weinberger |

| 19 November 2017 15 | Red Bull Salzburg | 5–0 | Sturm Graz | Wals-Siezenheim |
| 16:30 CET (UTC+1) | Gulbrandsen 8', (yellow card) 18'; Wolf (yellow card) 24'; Va. Berisha 36' (pen.); Yabo (yellow card) 38'; Maresic 45+2' (o.g.); Dabbur 84', 89' | Report | Siebenhandl (yellow card) 8'; Schulz (red card) 35'; Potzmann (yellow card) 60'; Röcher (yellow card) 90+4' | Stadium: Red Bull Arena; Attendance: 10,041; Referee: Gerhard Grobelnik |

| 26 November 2017 16 | Rapid Wien | 2–3 | Red Bull Salzburg | Vienna |
| 16:30 CET (UTC+1) | M.Hofmann (yellow card) 12'; Ljubicic 28'; Lucas Galvão (yellow card) 35'; Joelinton (yellow card) 62'; Kvilitaia 76', (yellow card) 82'; Auer (yellow card) 83' | Report | Miranda (yellow card) 7'; Pongračić (yellow card) 32'; Hwang Hee-chan 45+2', (yellow card) 87'; Ulmer 46', (yellow card) 90+3'; Yabo 50' | Stadium: Allianz Stadion; Attendance: 24,375; Referee: Markus Hameter |

| 29 November 2017 17 | Red Bull Salzburg | 2–0 | SV Mattersburg | Wals-Siezenheim |
| 18:30 CET (UTC+1) | Ćaleta-Car (yellow card) 69'; Haidara (yellow card) 71'; Dabbur 87'; Minamino 90+2' | Report | Rath (yellow card) 2' | Stadium: Red Bull Arena; Attendance: 3,722; Referee: Alexander Harkam |

| 3 December 2017 18 | Austria Wien | 1–1 | Red Bull Salzburg | Vienna |
| 16:30 CET (UTC+1) | Serbest (yellow card) 7'; Holzhauser (yellow card) 78'; Friesenbichler (yellow card) 85'; Monschein 90+4' | Report | Hwang Hee-chan (yellow card) 12'; Ćaleta-Car (yellow card) 71'; Ulmer 79' | Stadium: Ernst-Happel-Stadion; Attendance: 6,386; Referee: Oliver Drachta |

| 10 December 2017 19 | Wolfsberger AC | 0–0 | Red Bull Salzburg | Wolfsberg |
| 15:30 CET (UTC+1) | Sollbauer (yellow card) 33'; Flecker (yellow card) 86' | Report | Samassékou (yellow card) 25' (yellow-red card) 87' | Stadium: Lavanttal-Arena; Attendance: 1,901; Referee: Harald Lechner |

| 16 December 2017 20 | Red Bull Salzburg | 0–0 | LASK Linz | Wals-Siezenheim |
| 16:00 CET (UTC+1) | Hwang Hee-chan (yellow card) 65'; Ćaleta-Car (yellow card) 90+3' | Report | Michorl (yellow card) 51' | Stadium: Red Bull Arena; Attendance: 5,442; Referee: Rene Eisner |

| 3 February 2018 21 | Red Bull Salzburg | 2–1 | Admira Wacker Mödling | Wals-Siezenheim |
| 18:30 CET (UTC+1) | Dabbur 37', (yellow card) 61'; André Ramalho 90+5' | Report | Grozurek 41'; Jakoliš (yellow card) 72' | Stadium: Red Bull Arena; Attendance: 3,895; Referee: Julian Weinberger |

| 10 February 2018 22 | Rheindorf Altach | 0–1 | Red Bull Salzburg | Altach |
| 16:00 CET (UTC+1) | Netzer (yellow card) 77'; Schreiner (yellow card) 82' | Report | Lainer 55', (yellow card) 70'; Pongračić (yellow card) 86' | Stadium: CASHPOINT Arena; Attendance: 3,803; Referee: Gerhard Grobelnik |

| 18 February 2018 23 | Red Bull Salzburg | 4–0 | St. Pölten | Wals-Siezenheim |
| 16:30 CET (UTC+1) | Wolf 24' (pen.); Gulbrandsen 67'; Onguéné 75'; Dabbur 90+2' (pen.) | Report | | Stadium: Red Bull Arena; Attendance: 4,079; Referee: Manuel Schüttengruber |

| 25 February 2018 24 | Sturm Graz | 2–4 | Red Bull Salzburg | Graz |
| 16:30 CET (UTC+1) | Schrammel (yellow card) 33' (yellow-red card) 90'; Röcher 37'; Schulz (yellow card) 45' (yellow-red card) 82'; Hierländer 75'; Spendlhofer (yellow card) 78'; Siebenhandl (yellow card) 84' | Report | Ćaleta-Car (yellow card) 39'; Dabbur 45', 57'; Gulbrandsen (yellow card) 61', (goal) 73', 84' | Stadium: Merkur-Arena; Attendance: 7,157; Referee: Harald Lechner |

| 4 March 2018 25 | Red Bull Salzburg | 1–0 | Rapid Wien | Wals-Siezenheim |
| 16:30 CET (UTC+1) | Va. Berisha 73' | Report | Ve. Berisha (yellow card) 13'; Petsos (yellow card) 90+1' | Stadium: Red Bull Arena; Attendance: 11,781; Referee: Alesander Harkam |

| 11 March 2018 26 | SV Mattersburg | 2–2 | Red Bull Salzburg | Mattersburg |
| 16:30 CET (UTC+1) | Malić (yellow card) 22'; Okugawa (yellow card) 31'; Prevljak 55' (pen.), 82' (pen.); Novak (yellow card) 77' | Report | Farkas (red card) 12'; Gulbrandsen 27'; Va. Berisha (yellow card) 50'; Wolf 53'; Ulmer (yellow card) 67' | Stadium: Pappelstadion; Attendance: 4,100; Referee: Gerhard Grobelnik |

| 18 March 2018 27 | Red Bull Salzburg | 5–0 | Austria Wien | Wals-Siezenheim |
| 14:30 CET (UTC+1) | André Ramalho 17'; Yabo (yellow card) 54'; Minamino 59', 67'; Klein 72' (o.g.); Onguéné 90' | Report | Ruan (yellow card) 30'; Holzhauser (yellow card) 41' | Stadium: Red Bull Arena; Attendance: 6,826; Referee: Andreas Heiss |

| 31 March 2018 28 | Red Bull Salzburg | 2–0 | Wolfsberger AC | Wals-Siezenheim |
| 18:30 CEST (UTC+2) | Va. Berisha 39' (pen.); Dabbur 82' | Report | Ashimeru (yellow card) 47'; Ouédraogo (yellow card) 51'; Palla (yellow card) 56'; Flecker (yellow card) 81' | Stadium: Red Bull Arena; Attendance: 5,028; Referee: Alexander Harkam |

| 8 April 2018 29 | LASK Linz | 1–0 | Red Bull Salzburg | Pasching |
| 15:00 CEST (UTC+2) | João Victor 62'; Ramsebner (yellow card) 81' | Report | Dabbur (yellow card) 81' | Stadium: Waldstadion; Attendance: 5,452; Referee: Robert Schörgenhofer |

| 15 April 2018 30 | Admira Wacker Mödling | 2–6 | Red Bull Salzburg | Maria Enzersdorf |
| 19:00 CEST (UTC+2) | Schmidt 33', 90+2' | Report | Gulbrandsen 3', 57'; Wolf 22'; Mwepu 36'; Dabbur 60', 82', (penalty missed) 75' | Stadium: Bundesstadion Südstadt; Attendance: 2,800; Referee: Petru Ciochirca |

| 22 April 2018 31 | Red Bull Salzburg | 3–1 | Rheindorf Altach | Wals-Siezenheim |
| 14:30 CEST (UTC+2) | Onguéné 7'; Wolf 47'; Ulmer (yellow card) 90+5', (goal) 90+6' | Report | Gebauer (yellow card) 48'; Meilinger 59' | Stadium: Red Bull Arena; Attendance: 6,148; Referee: Dieter Muckenhammer |

| 29 April 2018 32 | St. Pölten | 0–2 | Red Bull Salzburg | Sankt Pölten |
| 19:00 CEST (UTC+2) | Rasner (yellow card) 63'; Luan (yellow card) 74' | Report | Haidara 20'; Minamino 48' | Stadium: NV Arena; Attendance: 3,552; Referee: Rene Eisner |

| 6 May 2018 33 | Red Bull Salzburg | 4–1 | Sturm Graz | Wals-Siezenheim |
| 16:30 CEST (UTC+2) | Pongračić (yellow card) 24'; Hwang Hee-chan 45+3'; Ćaleta-Car 54'; Onguéné 65'; Dabbur 83' | Report | Alar (yellow card) 27'; Žulj 40'; Spendlhofer (yellow card) 47'; Lovrić (yellow card) 58'; Jeggo (yellow card) 62' | Stadium: Red Bull Arena; Attendance: 14,912; Referee: Dieter Muckenhammer |

| 13 May 2018 34 | Rapid Wien | 1–4 | Red Bull Salzburg | Vienna |
| 16:30 CEST (UTC+2) | Ve. Berisha 75', (yellow card) 90+2'; Joelinton (yellow card) 90+4' | Report | Farkas 4'; Dabbur 13', 82'; Gulbrandsen 26', (yellow card) 49' | Stadium: Allianz Stadion; Attendance: 22,300; Referee: Oliver Drachta |

| 20 May 2018 35 | Red Bull Salzburg | 1–0 | SV Mattersburg | Wals-Siezenheim |
| CEST (UTC+2) | Wolf (yellow card) 56' (red card); Ćaleta-Car (yellow card) 76'; Dabbur (yellow card) 86'; Gulbrandsen 90+5' | Report | Seidl (yellow card) 33'; Erhardt (yellow card) 67'; Ertlthaler (yellow card) 82'; Malić (yellow card) 86'; Maierhofer (yellow card) 90+4' | Stadium: Red Bull Arena; Attendance: 14,441; Referee: Manuel Schüttengruber |

| 27 May 2018 36 | Austria Wien | 4–0 | Red Bull Salzburg | Vienna |
| 17:30 CEST (UTC+2) | Monschein 29'; Prokop 37'; Stronati 58'; Ruan (yellow card) 65'; Fitz 85' | Report | | Stadium: Ernst-Happel-Stadion; Attendance: 4,290; Referee: Markus Hameter |

=== Austrian Cup ===
| 15 July 2017 First Round | Deutschlandsberger | 0–7 | Red Bull Salzburg | Deutschlandsberg |
| 17:00 CEST (UTC+2) | T. Wotolen (yellow card) 37' (yellow-red card) 40' | Report | Stangl 34'; Hwang Hee-chan 37' (pen.); Minamino 45'; Va. Berisha 53', 88'; Gulbrandsen 57', 61' | Stadium: Koralmstadion; Attendance: 2,000; Referee: Manuel Schüttengruber |

| 21 September 2017 Second Round | Bruck/Leitha | 1–3 (a.e.t.) | Red Bull Salzburg | Parndorf |
| 19:00 CEST (UTC+2) | Burusic 25'; M. Lechner (yellow card) 80'; M. Schöny (yellow card) 95' | Report | Gulbrandsen 20' (pen.); Wolf 107'; Daka 111'; Haidara (yellow card) 115' | Stadium: Heidebodenstadion; Attendance: 1,800; Referee: Patru Ciochirca |

| 25 October 2017 Third Round | Bad Gleichenberg | 0–3 | Red Bull Salzburg | Bad Gleichenberg |
| 19:00 CET (UTC+1) | C. Degen (yellow card) 40'; J. Trummer (yellow card) 73' | Report | Yabo (yellow card) 13', (goal) 45+1'; Onguéné 62'; Rzatkowski 85'; Ćaleta-Car (yellow card) 90' | Stadium: Bad Gleichenberg Arena; Attendance: 4,114; Referee: Dieter Muckenhammer |

| 28 February 2018 Quarter-finals | Red Bull Salzburg | 7–0 | Austria Klagenfurt | Wals-Siezenheim |
| 19:30 CEST (UTC+2) | Farkas 13'; Hwang Hee-chan 15', 37'; Haidara 24'; Gulbrandsen 69'; Wolf 71', 73' | Report | | Stadium: Red Bull Arena; Attendance: 1,536; Referee: Andreas Heiß |

| 18 April 2018 Semi-finals | Mattersburg | 0–0 (0–3 p) | Red Bull Salzburg | Mattersburg |
| 18:00 CEST (UTC+2) | Höller (yellow card) 40'; Renner (yellow card) 84'; Novak (yellow card) 89' | Report | Haidara (yellow card) 27'; Va. Berisha (yellow card) 82' | Stadium: Pappelstadion; Attendance: 4,800; Referee: Manuel Schüttengruber |
| | Penalties |
| | Höller (penalty missed); Malić (penalty missed); Seidl (penalty missed) | | (penalty scored) Va. Berisha; (penalty scored) André Ramalho; (penalty scored) Lainer |

| 9 May 2018 Final | Sturm Graz | 1–0 (a.e.t.) | Red Bull Salzburg | Klagenfurt |
| 20:30 CEST (UTC+2) | Röcher (yellow card) 35'; Žulj (yellow card) 41'; Koch (yellow card) 45+2'; Jantscher (yellow card) 102'; Hierländer 112'; Potzmann (yellow card) 118' | Report | Ćaleta-Car (yellow card) 17'; Berisha (yellow card) 18'; André Ramalho (yellow card) 62' (yellow-red card) 71'; Hwang Hee-chan (yellow card) 107'; Haidara (yellow card) 120' | Stadium: Wörthersee Stadion; Attendance: 27,100; Referee: Haralad Lechner |

=== UEFA Champions League ===
==== Qualifying rounds ====
| 11 July 2017 Second qualifying round 1st leg | Hibernians (Malta) | 0–3 | (Austria) Red Bull Salzburg | Paola, Malta |
| 20:30 CEST (UTC+2) | Marcelo Dias (yellow card) 11' | Report | Va. Berisha 32' (pen.), (red card) 86'; Hwang Hee-chan 35', (yellow card) 45'; Lazaro (yellow card) 44'; Minamino 54' | Stadium: Hibernians Stadium; Attendance: 1,452; Referee: Fran Jović (Croatia) |

| 19 July 2017 Second qualifying round 2nd leg | Red Bull Salzburg (Austria) | 3–0 (6–0 agg.) | (Malta) Hibernians | Wals-Siezenheim, Austria |
| 20:30 CEST (UTC+2) | Rzatkowski 11'; Guldbrandsen 19'; Haidara 85' | Report | | Stadium: Red Bull Arena; Attendance: 5,511; Referee: Sergey Lapochkin (Russia) |

| 26 July 2017 Third qualifying round 1st leg | Red Bull Salzburg (Austria) | 1–1 | (Croatia) Rijeka | Wals-Siezenheim, Austria |
| 18:45 CEST (UTC+2) | Hwang Hee-chan (yellow card) 42', (goal) 49'; Ulmer (yellow card) 82' | Report | Gavranović 30'; Vešović (yellow card) 45'; Župarić (yellow card) 79' | Stadium: Red Bull Arena; Attendance: 12,714; Referee: Daniel Stefański (Poland) |

| 2 August 2017 Third qualifying round 2nd leg | Rijeka (Croatia) | 0–0 ((a) 1–1 agg.) | (Austria) Red Bull Salzburg | Rijeka, Croatia |
| 20:45 CEST (UTC+2) | Maleš (yellow card) 62'; Mišić (yellow card) 70'; Bradarić (yellow card) 84' | Report | Ćaleta-Car (yellow card) 7'; Yabo (yellow card) 45+2'; Samassékou (yellow card) 51'; Miranda (yellow card) 90+5' | Stadium: Stadion Rujevica; Attendance: 8,118; Referee: Hüseyin Göçek (Turkey) |

=== UEFA Europa League ===
==== Qualifying rounds ====
| 17 August 2017 Playoff round 1st leg | Viitorul Constanța (Romania) | 1–3 | (Austria) Red Bull Salzburg | Ovidiu, Romania |
| 20:45 CEST (UTC+2) | Țucudean 7'; López (yellow card) 25'; Mladen (yellow card) 34'; Eric (yellow card) 90+4' | Report | Hwang Hee-chan 2'; Wolf 29'; Dabbur 31'; Miranda (yellow card) 55' | Stadium: Stadionul Viitorul; Attendance: 3,338; Referee: Anthony Taylor (England) |

| 24 August 2017 Playoff round 2nd leg | Red Bull Salzburg (Austria) | 4–0 (7–1 agg.) | (Romania) Viitorul Constanța | Wals-Siezenheim, Austria |
| 19:00 CEST (UTC+2) | Dabbur 7'; Pongračić (yellow card) 36'; Gulbrandsen 38'; Va. Berisha 52' (pen.); Haidara 88'; Daka (yellow card) 90+2' | Report | Vînă (yellow card) 45'; Hodorogea (yellow card) 52' | Stadium: Red Bull Arena; Attendance: 6,606; Referee: Stefan Johannesson (Sweden) |

==== Group stage ====
| Pos | Team | Pld | W | D | L | GF | GA | GD | Pts | Qualification | SAL | MAR | KON | VSC |
|---|---|---|---|---|---|---|---|---|---|---|---|---|---|---|
| 1 | (Austria) Red Bull Salzburg | 6 | 3 | 3 | 0 | 7 | 1 | +6 | 12 | Advance to knockout phase | — | 1–0 | 0–0 | 3–0 |
| 2 | (France) Marseille | 6 | 2 | 2 | 2 | 4 | 4 | 0 | 8 | Advance to knockout phase | 0–0 | — | 1–0 | 2–1 |
| 3 | (Turkey) Konyaspor | 6 | 1 | 3 | 2 | 4 | 6 | −2 | 6 | | 0–2 | 1–1 | — | 2–1 |
| 4 | (Portugal) Vitória de Guimarães | 6 | 1 | 2 | 3 | 5 | 9 | −4 | 5 | | 1–1 | 1–0 | 1–1 | — |

Source: UEFA
Rules for classification: Group stage tiebreakers

| 14 September 2017 1 | Vitória de Guimarães (Portugal) | 1–1 | (Austria) Red Bull Salzburg | Guimarães, Portugal |
| 21:05 CEST (UTC+2) | Pedrão 25' | Report | Va. Berisha 45'; Leitgeb (yellow card) 90+3' | Stadium: Estádio D. Afonso Henriques; Attendance: 13,972; Referee: Aliyar Aghayev (Azerbaijan) |

| 28 September 2017 2 | Red Bull Salzburg (Austria) | 1–0 | (France) Marseille | Wals-Siezenheim, Austria |
| 19:00 CEST (UTC+2) | Dabbur 73'; Ćaleta-Car (yellow card) 85' | Report | Zambo Anguissa (yellow card) 78'; Kamara (yellow card) 89' | Stadium: Red Bull Arena; Attendance: 11,832; Referee: Ivan Bebek (Croatia) |

| 19 October 2017 3 | Konyaspor (Turkey) | 0–2 | (Austria) Red Bull Salzburg | Konya, Turkey |
| 19:00 CEST (UTC+2) | Jønsson (yellow card) 53' | Report | Gulbrandsen 5'; Lainer (yellow card) 56'; Dabbur 80' | Stadium: Büyükşehir Stadium; Attendance: 23,354; Referee: Craig Pawson (England) |

| 2 November 2017 4 | Red Bull Salzburg (Austria) | 0–0 | (Turkey) Konyaspor | Wals-Siezenheim, Austria |
| 21:05 CET (UTC+1) | | Report | Jønsson (yellow card) 29'; Çamdalı (yellow card) 77' | Stadium: Red Bull Arena; Attendance: 8,773; Referee: Paolo Mazzoleni (Italy) |

| 23 November 2017 5 | Red Bull Salzburg (Austria) | 3–0 | (Portugal) Vitória de Guimarães | Wals-Siezenheim, Austria |
| 19:00 CET (UTC+1) | Dabbur 26'; Ulmer 45+1'; Hwang Hee-chan 67'; Haidara (yellow card) 76'; Schlager (yellow card) 77' | Report | | Stadium: Red Bull Arena; Attendance: 6,474; Referee: Andrew Dallas (Scotland) |

| 7 December 2017 6 | Marseille (France) | 0–0 | (Austria) Red Bull Salzburg | Marseille, France |
| 21:05 CET (UTC+1) | Ocampos (yellow card) 28' | Report | Ćaleta-Car (yellow card) 57'; Hwang Hee-chan (yellow card) 81' | Stadium: Stade Vélodrome; Attendance: 23,865; Referee: Aleksei Kulbakov (Belarus) |

==== Knockout phase ====
| 15 February 2018 Round of 32 1st leg | Real Sociedad (Spain) | 2–2 | (Austria) Red Bull Salzburg | San Sebastián, Spain |
| 19:00 CET (UTC+1) | Rulli (yellow card) 27'; Illarramendi (yellow card) 36'; Moreno (yellow card) 41'; Odriozola 57'; Prieto (yellow card) 72'; Januzaj 80'; Elustondo (yellow card) 83' | Report | Oyarzabal 27' (o.g.); Hwang Hee-chan (yellow card) 41'; André Ramalho (yellow card) 60'; Samassékou (yellow card) 62'; Yabo (yellow card) 75'; Ćaleta-Car (yellow card) 79'; Dabbur (yellow card) 83'; Minamino 90+4' | Stadium: Anoeta; Attendance: 19,790; Referee: Bobby Madden (Scotland) |

| 22 February 2018 Round of 32 2nd leg | Red Bull Salzburg (Austria) | 2–1 (4–3 agg.) | (Spain) Real Sociedad | Wals-Siezenheim, Austria |
| 21:05 CET (UTC+1) | Schlager (yellow card) 9'; Dabbur 10', (yellow card) 31'; Va. Berisha 74' (pen.) | Report | Navas (yellow card) 24' (yellow-red card) 71', (goal) 28'; Illarramendi (yellow card) 90+1' | Stadium: Red Bull Arena; Attendance: 13,912; Referee: Sergei Karasev (Russia) |

| 8 March 2018 Round of 16 1st leg | Borussia Dortmund (Germany) | 1–2 | (Austria) Red Bull Salzburg | Dortmund, Germany |
| 19:00 CET (UTC+1) | Toprak (yellow card) 48'; Schürrle 62', (yellow card) 70'; Weigl (yellow card) 89' | Report | Va. Berisha 49' (pen.), 56'; Lainer (yellow card) 59'; Ćaleta-Car (yellow card) 79'; Minamino (yellow card) 88' | Stadium: Westfalenstadion; Attendance: 53,700; Referee: Slavko Vinčić (Slovenia) |

| 15 March 2018 Round of 16 2nd leg | Red Bull Salzburg (Austria) | 0–0 (2–1 agg.) | (Germany) Borussia Dortmund | Wals-Siezenheim, Austria |
| 21:05 CET (UTC+1) | Hwang Hee-chan (yellow card) 52'; Va. Berisha (yellow card) 63'; Ulmer (yellow card) 87'; Samassékou (yellow card) 90+2' | Report | Papastathopoulos (yellow card) 46'; Zagadou (yellow card) 89' | Stadium: Red Bull Arena; Attendance: 29,520; Referee: Benoît Bastien (France) |

| 5 April 2018 Quarter-finals 1st leg | Lazio (Italy) | 4–2 | (Austria) Red Bull Salzburg | Rome, Italy |
| 21:05 CEST (UTC+2) | Lulić 8', (yellow card) 30'; Basta (yellow card) 28'; Parolo (yellow card) 45+3', (goal) 49'; Felipe Anderson 74'; Immobile 76' | Report | Va. Berisha 30' (pen.); Minamino 71'; Schlager (yellow card) 83'; Samassékou (yellow card) 84' | Stadium: Stadio Olimpico; Attendance: 42,538; Referee: Ovidiu Hațegan (Romania) |

| 12 April 2018 Quarter-finals 2nd leg | Red Bull Salzburg (Austria) | 4–1 (6–5 agg.) | (Italy) Lazio | Wals-Siezenheim, Austria |
| 21:05 CEST (UTC+2) | Dabbur 56'; Ulmer (yellow card) 60'; Haidara 72'; Hwang Hee-chan 74'; Lainer 76'; André Ramalho (yellow card) 90+2'; Walke (yellow card) 90+2' | Report | Immobile 55'; Lucas (yellow card) 64'; Luiz Felipe (yellow card) 65'; Milinković-Savić (yellow card) 89' | Stadium: Red Bull Arena; Attendance: 29,520; Referee: Damir Skomina (Slovenia) |

| 26 April 2018 Semi-finals 1st leg | Marseille (France) | 2–0 | (Austria) Red Bull Salzburg | Marseille, France |
| 21:05 CEST (UTC+2) | Thauvin 15'; Lopez (yellow card) 20'; N'Jie 63'; Mitroglou (yellow card) 90' | Report | Wolf (yellow card) 22' | Stadium: Stade Vélodrome; Attendance: 62,312; Referee: Willie Collum (Scotland) |

| 3 May 2018 Semi-finals 2nd leg | Red Bull Salzburg (Austria) | 2–1 (a.e.t.) (2–3 agg.) | (France) Marseille | Wals-Siezenheim, Austria |
| 21:05 CEST (UTC+2) | Haidara 53', (yellow card) 75' (yellow-red card) 119'; Sarr 65' (o.g.); André Ramalho (yellow card) 84'; Ćaleta-Car (yellow card) 94'; Dabbur (yellow card) 117' | Report | Sarr (yellow card) 35'; Lopez (yellow card) 39'; Rami (yellow card) 57'; Germain (yellow card) 77'; Payet (yellow card) 84'; Amavi (yellow card) 100'; Rolando 116', (yellow card) 116'; Pelé (yellow card) 120+2' | Stadium: Red Bull Arena; Referee: Sergei Karasev (Russia) |

== Statistics ==
As of match played 27 May 2018

=== Appearances and goals ===
| No. | Pos | Nat | Player | Total | | Bundesliga | | Austrian Cup | | UEFA Champions League | | UEFA Europa League | |
| No. | Pos | Nat | Player | Apps | Goals | Apps | Goals | Apps | Goals | Apps | Goals | Apps | Goals |
|---|---|---|---|---|---|---|---|---|---|---|---|---|---|
| 1 | GK | (Austria) AUT | Cican Stankovic | 17 | 0 | 9 | 0 | 5 | 0 | 1 | 0 | 2 | 0 |
| 4 | MF | (Mali) MLI | Amadou Haidara | 55 | 8 | 20+11 | 3 | 5+1 | 1 | 0+2 | 1 | 14+2 | 3 |
| 5 | DF | (Croatia) CRO | Duje Ćaleta-Car | 53 | 2 | 27+1 | 2 | 6 | 0 | 4 | 0 | 15 | 0 |
| 6 | DF | (France) FRA | Jérôme Onguéné | 22 | 5 | 14+3 | 4 | 3+1 | 1 | 0 | 0 | 1 | 0 |
| 7 | MF | (Germany) GER | Reinhold Yabo | 38 | 3 | 18+6 | 2 | 2 | 1 | 3 | 0 | 4+5 | 0 |
| 8 | MF | (Mali) MLI | Diadie Samassékou | 50 | 0 | 27+2 | 0 | 3 | 0 | 4 | 0 | 14 | 0 |
| 9 | FW | (Israel) ISR | Mu'nas Dabbur | 55 | 29 | 27+5 | 22 | 1+2 | 0 | 4 | 0 | 16 | 7 |
| 13 | MF | (Austria) AUT | Hannes Wolf | 44 | 12 | 20+7 | 8 | 4 | 3 | 1+3 | 0 | 7+2 | 1 |
| 14 | MF | (Kosovo) KOS | Valon Berisha | 45 | 13 | 24 | 4 | 3 | 2 | 3 | 1 | 14+1 | 6 |
| 15 | DF | (Brazil) BRA | André Ramalho | 18 | 2 | 8 | 2 | 2 | 0 | 0 | 0 | 8 | 0 |
| 16 | MF | (Hungary) HUN | Dominik Szoboszlai | 1 | 0 | 0+1 | 0 | 0 | 0 | 0 | 0 | 0 | 0 |
| 17 | DF | (Austria) AUT | Andreas Ulmer | 49 | 4 | 26 | 3 | 3 | 0 | 4 | 0 | 16 | 1 |
| 18 | FW | (Japan) JPN | Takumi Minamino | 44 | 11 | 20+8 | 7 | 4 | 1 | 3 | 1 | 1+8 | 2 |
| 19 | FW | (South Korea) KOR | Hwang Hee-chan | 37 | 13 | 10+10 | 5 | 2+1 | 3 | 3+1 | 2 | 7+3 | 3 |
| 21 | FW | (Norway) NOR | Fredrik Gulbrandsen | 55 | 18 | 22+9 | 11 | 4+1 | 4 | 1+3 | 1 | 8+7 | 2 |
| 22 | DF | (Austria) AUT | Stefan Lainer | 55 | 2 | 28+5 | 1 | 4 | 0 | 2 | 0 | 16 | 1 |
| 24 | MF | (Austria) AUT | Christoph Leitgeb | 17 | 0 | 4+8 | 0 | 2 | 0 | 1 | 0 | 0+2 | 0 |
| 25 | DF | (Austria) AUT | Patrick Farkas | 22 | 2 | 13+3 | 1 | 4+1 | 1 | 0+1 | 0 | 0 | 0 |
| 28 | MF | (Austria) AUT | Romano Schmid | 1 | 0 | 0+1 | 0 | 0 | 0 | 0 | 0 | 0 | 0 |
| 31 | GK | (Brazil) BRA | Carlos | 1 | 0 | 1 | 0 | 0 | 0 | 0 | 0 | 0 | 0 |
| 33 | GK | (Germany) GER | Alexander Walke | 44 | 0 | 26 | 0 | 1 | 0 | 3 | 0 | 14 | 0 |
| 34 | DF | (Croatia) CRO | Marin Pongračić | 23 | 0 | 14+2 | 0 | 1+2 | 0 | 0 | 0 | 2+2 | 0 |
| 41 | FW | (Zambia) ZAM | Patson Daka | 12 | 1 | 2+6 | 0 | 0+2 | 1 | 0 | 0 | 0+2 | 0 |
| 42 | MF | (Austria) AUT | Xaver Schlager | 44 | 1 | 17+9 | 1 | 3+1 | 0 | 0 | 0 | 10+4 | 0 |
| 45 | MF | (Zambia) ZAM | Enock Mwepu | 10 | 1 | 4+4 | 1 | 0+2 | 0 | 0 | 0 | 0 | 0 |
| 55 | DF | (Austria) AUT | Luca Meisl | 2 | 0 | 0+1 | 0 | 0+1 | 0 | 0 | 0 | 0 | 0 |
Players also registered for Liefering :
Players away on loan :
| 11 | MF | (Germany) GER | Marc Rzatkowski | 14 | 3 | 2+3 | 1 | 2 | 1 | 1+2 | 1 | 1+3 | 0 |
| 20 | MF | (Ghana) GHA | David Atanga | 3 | 0 | 0+1 | 0 | 1 | 0 | 0 | 0 | 0+1 | 0 |
| 23 | DF | (Austria) AUT | Stefan Stangl | 3 | 1 | 2 | 0 | 1 | 1 | 0 | 0 | 0 | 0 |
| 29 | FW | (Ghana) GHA | Samuel Tetteh | 2 | 0 | 0 | 0 | 0+1 | 0 | 0 | 0 | 0+1 | 0 |
| 37 | FW | (Germany) GER | Mërgim Berisha | 1 | 0 | 0 | 0 | 0+1 | 0 | 0 | 0 | 0 | 0 |
| 44 | DF | (Brazil) BRA | Igor | 3 | 0 | 1 | 0 | 0+2 | 0 | 0 | 0 | 0 | 0 |
Players who left Red Bull Salzburg during the season:
| 3 | DF | (Brazil) BRA | Paulo Miranda | 20 | 0 | 10 | 0 | 0 | 0 | 4 | 0 | 6 | 0 |
| 10 | MF | (Austria) AUT | Valentino Lazaro | 3 | 0 | 0 | 0 | 0+1 | 0 | 2 | 0 | 0 | 0 |

=== Goal scorers ===
| Place | Position | Nation | Number | Name | Bundesliga | Austrian Cup | UEFA Champions League | UEFA Europa League | Total |
|---|---|---|---|---|---|---|---|---|---|
| 1 | FW | (Israel) | 9 | Mu'nas Dabbur | 22 | 0 | 0 | 7 | 29 |
| 2 | FW | (Norway) | 21 | Fredrik Gulbrandsen | 11 | 4 | 1 | 2 | 18 |
| 3 | MF | (Kosovo) | 14 | Valon Berisha | 4 | 2 | 1 | 6 | 13 |
| 4 | FW | (South Korea) | 19 | Hwang Hee-chan | 5 | 3 | 2 | 3 | 13 |
| 5 | MF | (Austria) | 13 | Hannes Wolf | 8 | 3 | 0 | 1 | 12 |
| 6 | FW | (Japan) | 18 | Takumi Minamino | 7 | 1 | 1 | 2 | 11 |
| 7 | MF | (Mali) | 4 | Amadou Haidara | 3 | 1 | 1 | 3 | 8 |
| 8 | DF | (France) | 6 | Jérôme Onguéné | 4 | 1 | 0 | 0 | 5 |
| 8 | | | | Own goal | 3 | 0 | 0 | 2 | 5 |
| 10 | DF | (Austria) | 17 | Andreas Ulmer | 3 | 0 | 0 | 1 | 4 |
| 11 | MF | (Germany) | 7 | Reinhold Yabo | 2 | 1 | 0 | 0 | 3 |
| 11 | MF | (Germany) | 11 | Marc Rzatkowski | 1 | 1 | 1 | 0 | 3 |
| 13 | DF | (Brazil) | 15 | André Ramalho | 2 | 0 | 0 | 0 | 2 |
| 13 | DF | (Croatia) | 5 | Duje Ćaleta-Car | 2 | 0 | 0 | 0 | 2 |
| 13 | MF | (Austria) | 25 | Patrick Farkas | 1 | 1 | 0 | 0 | 2 |
| 13 | DF | (Austria) | 22 | Stefan Lainer | 1 | 0 | 0 | 1 | 2 |
| 17 | MF | (Austria) | 42 | Xaver Schlager | 1 | 0 | 0 | 0 | 1 |
| 17 | MF | (Zambia) | 45 | Enock Mwepu | 1 | 0 | 0 | 0 | 1 |
| 17 | DF | (Austria) | 23 | Stefan Stangl | 0 | 1 | 0 | 0 | 1 |
| 17 | FW | (Zambia) | 41 | Patson Daka | 0 | 1 | 0 | 0 | 1 |
| | | | | TOTALS | 81 | 20 | 7 | 28 | 136 |

=== Clean sheets ===
| Place | Position | Nation | Number | Name | Bundesliga | Austrian Cup | UEFA Champions League | UEFA Europa League | Total |
|---|---|---|---|---|---|---|---|---|---|
| 1 | GK | (Germany) | 33 | Alexander Walke | 12 | 1 | 2 | 6 | 21 |
| 2 | GK | (Austria) | 1 | Cican Stankovic | 3 | 3 | 1 | 1 | 8 |
| | | | | TOTALS | 15 | 4 | 3 | 7 | 29 |

=== Disciplinary record ===
| Number | Nation | Position | Name | Bundesliga | | Austrian Cup | | UEFA Champions League | | UEFA Europa League | | Total | |
| Number | Nation | Position | Name | Yellow card | Red card | Yellow card | Red card | Yellow card | Red card | Yellow card | Red card | Yellow card | Red card |
| 1 | (Austria) | GK | Cican Stankovic | 1 | 0 | 0 | 0 | 0 | 0 | 0 | 0 | 1 | 0 |
| 4 | (Mali) | MF | Amadou Haidara | 4 | 0 | 3 | 0 | 0 | 0 | 3 | 1 | 10 | 1 |
| 5 | (Croatia) | DF | Duje Ćaleta-Car | 10 | 0 | 2 | 0 | 1 | 0 | 5 | 0 | 18 | 0 |
| 6 | (France) | DF | Jérôme Onguéné | 1 | 0 | 0 | 0 | 0 | 0 | 0 | 0 | 1 | 0 |
| 7 | (Germany) | MF | Reinhold Yabo | 2 | 0 | 1 | 0 | 1 | 0 | 1 | 0 | 5 | 0 |
| 8 | (Mali) | MF | Diadie Samassékou | 5 | 1 | 0 | 0 | 1 | 0 | 3 | 0 | 9 | 1 |
| 9 | (Israel) | FW | Mu'nas Dabbur | 4 | 0 | 0 | 0 | 0 | 0 | 3 | 0 | 7 | 0 |
| 13 | (Austria) | FW | Hannes Wolf | 4 | 1 | 0 | 0 | 0 | 0 | 0 | 0 | 4 | 1 |
| 14 | (Kosovo) | MF | Valon Berisha | 2 | 0 | 2 | 0 | 0 | 1 | 1 | 0 | 5 | 1 |
| 15 | (Brazil) | DF | André Ramalho | 0 | 0 | 2 | 1 | 0 | 0 | 3 | 0 | 5 | 1 |
| 17 | (Austria) | DF | Andreas Ulmer | 4 | 0 | 0 | 0 | 1 | 0 | 2 | 0 | 7 | 0 |
| 18 | (Japan) | FW | Takumi Minamino | 0 | 0 | 0 | 0 | 0 | 0 | 1 | 0 | 1 | 0 |
| 19 | (South Korea) | FW | Hwang Hee-chan | 4 | 0 | 1 | 0 | 2 | 0 | 3 | 0 | 10 | 0 |
| 21 | (Norway) | FW | Fredrik Gulbrandsen | 6 | 0 | 0 | 0 | 0 | 0 | 0 | 0 | 6 | 0 |
| 22 | (Austria) | DF | Stefan Lainer | 2 | 0 | 0 | 0 | 0 | 0 | 2 | 0 | 4 | 0 |
| 24 | (Austria) | MF | Christoph Leitgeb | 0 | 0 | 0 | 0 | 0 | 0 | 1 | 0 | 1 | 0 |
| 25 | (Austria) | DF | Patrick Farkas | 1 | 1 | 0 | 0 | 0 | 0 | 0 | 0 | 1 | 1 |
| 33 | (Germany) | GK | Alexander Walke | 0 | 0 | 0 | 0 | 0 | 0 | 1 | 0 | 1 | 0 |
| 34 | (Croatia) | DF | Marin Pongračić | 4 | 0 | 0 | 0 | 0 | 0 | 1 | 0 | 5 | 0 |
| 41 | (Zambia) | FW | Patson Daka | 0 | 0 | 0 | 0 | 0 | 0 | 1 | 0 | 1 | 0 |
| 42 | (Austria) | MF | Xaver Schlager | 1 | 0 | 0 | 0 | 0 | 0 | 3 | 0 | 4 | 0 |
Players away on loan:
Players who left Red Bull Salzburg during the season:
| 3 | (Brazil) | DF | Paulo Miranda | 3 | 0 | 0 | 0 | 1 | 0 | 1 | 0 | 6 | 0 |
| 10 | (Austria) | MF | Valentino Lazaro | 0 | 0 | 0 | 0 | 1 | 0 | 0 | 0 | 1 | 0 |
| | | | TOTALS | 58 | 3 | 11 | 1 | 8 | 1 | 35 | 1 | 112 | 6 |
