= Marin Pongračić =

Croatian footballer (born 1997)

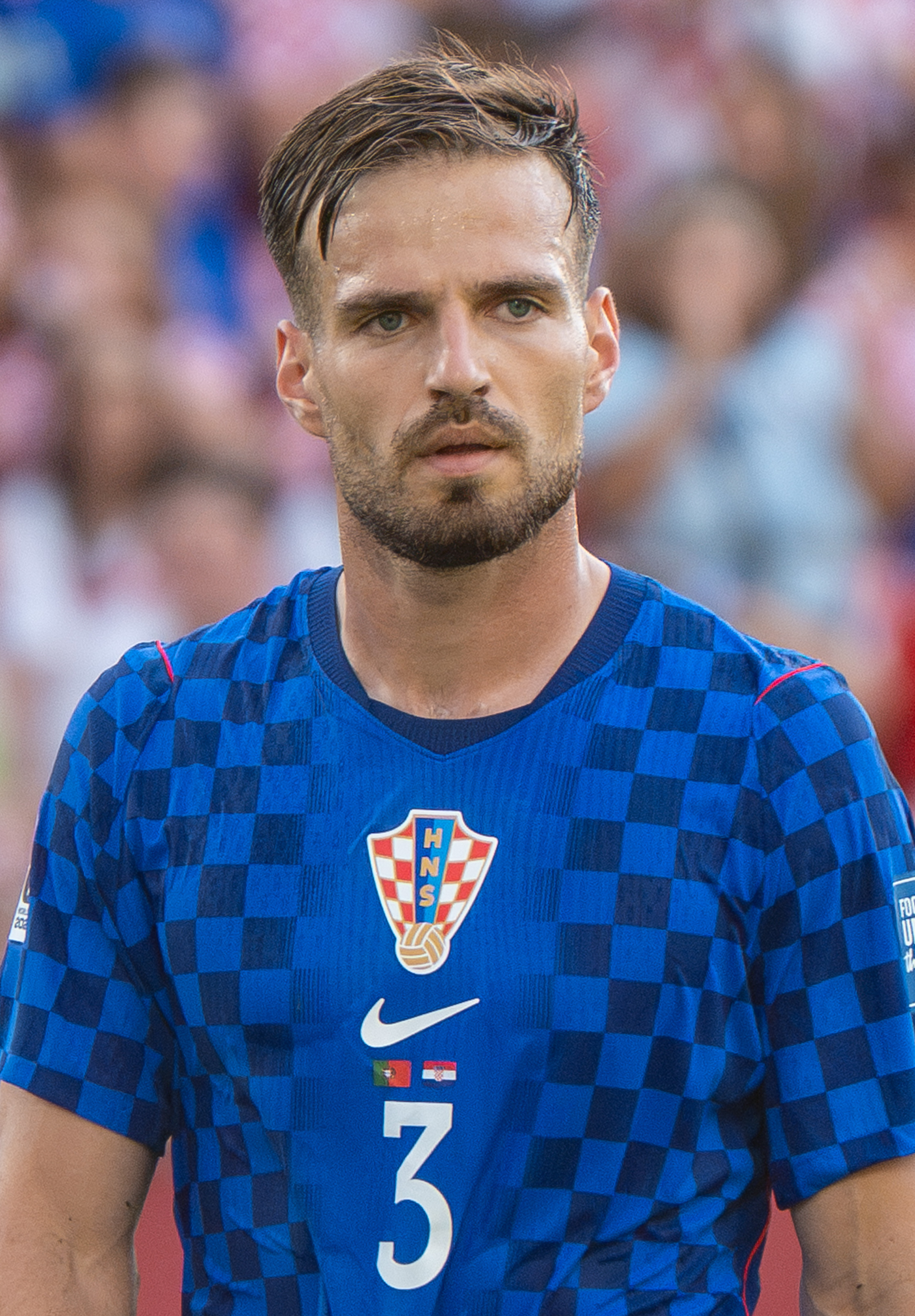
- Pongračić with Croatia in 2026

Personal information
- Date of birth: 11 September 1997 (age 29)
- Place of birth: Landshut, Bavaria, Germany
- Height: 1.90 m (6 ft 3 in)
- Position: Centre-back

Team information
- Current team: Fiorentina
- Number: 5

Youth career
- –2013: Bayern Munich
- 2013–2016: FC Ingolstadt 04

Senior career*
Years	Team	Apps	(Gls)
2016–2017	1860 Munich II	17	(1)
2017	1860 Munich	6	(0)
2017–2020	Red Bull Salzburg	35	(0)
2020–2023	VfL Wolfsburg	21	(2)
2021–2022	→ Borussia Dortmund (loan)	17	(0)
2022–2023	→ Lecce (loan)	9	(0)
2023–2024	Lecce	36	(0)
2024–	Fiorentina	59	(1)

International career^{‡}
2017–2018	Croatia U21	3	(0)
2020–	Croatia	24	(0)
- * Club domestic league appearances and goals as of 17:02, 18 October 2026 (UTC) ‡ National team caps and goals as of 21:45, 29 September 2026 (UTC)

Marin Pongračić (Croatian pronunciation: [mâriːn pǒnɡratʃitɕ]; born 11 September 1997) is a professional footballer who plays as a defender for Serie A club Fiorentina. Born in Germany, he plays for the Croatia national team. Primarily a centre-back, he can also be deployed as a right-back or as a defensive midfielder.

== Club career ==
=== 1860 Munich ===
Pongračić started his football career as a product of Bayern Munich academy, before moving to FC Ingolstadt 04 in 2013 at the age of 16. He made 38 appearances at under-17 and under-19 levels, before moving to 1860 Munich in 2016 in search of professional football. After establishing himself in the reserve team, he made his 2. Bundesliga debut on 16 April 2017 in a 1–1 draw with Sandhausen.

He made seven appearances for the first team, including an appearance in a relegation play-off against Jahn Regensburg. Pongračić was sent off in the 80th minute, as the match ended up as a 1–1 draw.

=== Red Bull Salzburg ===
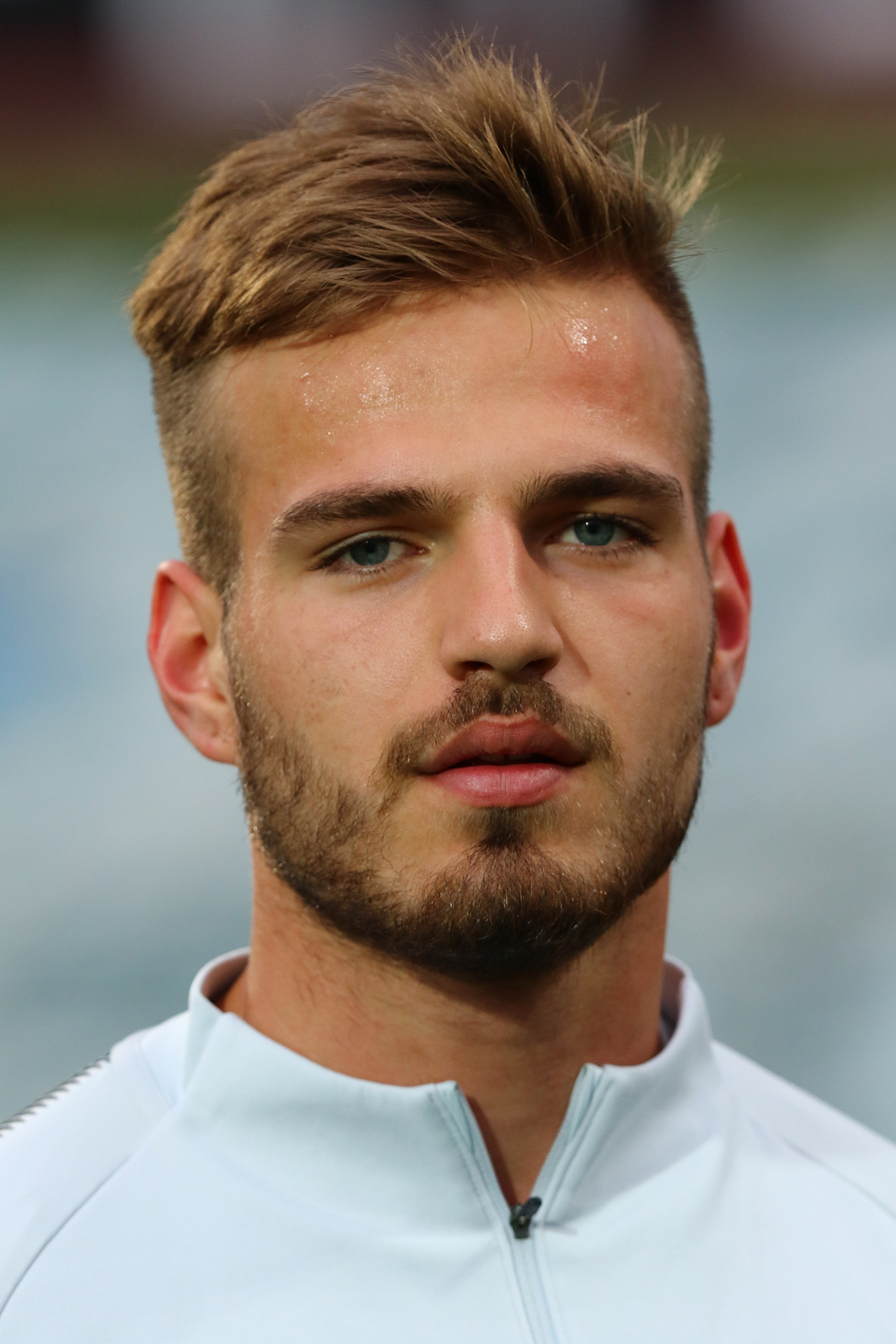
Pongračić with Red Bull Salzburg in 2018

In summer 2017, he joined Austrian club Red Bull Salzburg on a four-year deal. He made his debut for the club on 22 July in a 2–0 victory over Wolfsberger AC. However, due to an abductor muscle injury, he missed thirteen games for the club. He returned to the team for the 5 November game against St. Pölten.

He made his UEFA Europa League debut on 23 November in a 3–0 victory over Vitória Guimarães. He then featured throughout Salzburg's Europa League campaign as they reached the semi-final, where they were eliminated by Marseille. Salzburg ended the season as the Austrian champions.

On 29 August 2018, in a Champions League qualifying play-off return leg against Red Star Belgrade, with Salzburg 2–0 up on the night and seemingly comfortably headed towards Champions League qualification, Pongračić received a 63rd-minute yellow card for fouling Milan Pavkov by stomping on him. The game ended a 2–2 draw and Red Star qualified on away goals.

Red Star captain Vujadin Savić later credited Pongračić's foul for providing extra motivation to the Belgrade club, calling Pongračić out for "provocations throughout the entire match." On 21 February 2019, he provided Patson Daka with an assist for the second goal as Salzburg defeated Club Brugge 4–0 in Europa League round of 32. In his second season at the club, Pongračić helped Salzburg win the double.

During the first half of the 2019–20 season, he made only seven appearances for the club due to injuries. On 5 November, he made his Champions League debut in a 1–1 draw with Napoli.

=== VfL Wolfsburg ===
After the injury-stricken stint at Salzburg, Pongračić joined VfL Wolfsburg on 15 January 2020 on a four-and-a-half-year deal for a fee believed to be €10 million. On 8 February, in his second appearance for the club, he was sent off after elbowing Alfredo Morales, as Wolfsburg drew 1–1 with Fortuna Düsseldorf. On 26 May, Pongračić scored twice as Wolfsburg defeated Bayer Leverkusen by a score of 4–1.

After he missed the beginning of the new season due to mononucleosis, Pongračić returned to the team on 8 November as an injury time substitute for Xaver Schlager in the 2–1 victory over 1899 Hoffenheim. However, on 18 November, he tested positive for COVID-19. On 27 February 2021, he was sent off in the injury time of a 2–0 victory over Hertha Berlin.

==== Borussia Dortmund (loan) ====
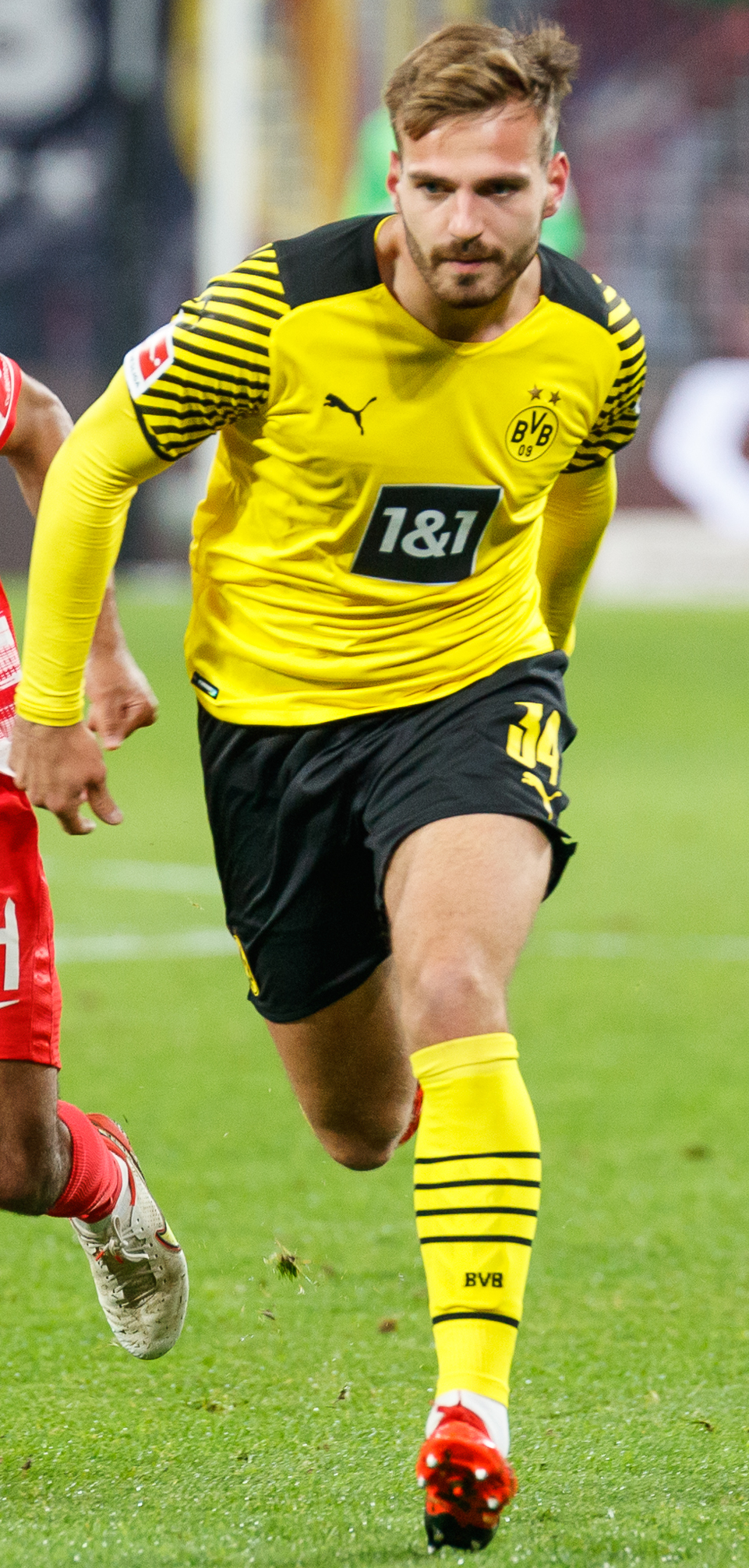
Pongračić playing for Borussia Dortmund in 2021

On 31 August 2021, Pongračić joined Borussia Dortmund on loan for the duration of the 2021–22 season. He made his Dortmund debut on 11 September in a 4–3 victory over Bayer Leverkusen.

=== Lecce ===
On 22 August 2022, Pongračić moved on loan to Lecce in Italy, with an option to buy.

On 30 June 2023, Lecce announced that they had exercised their option to buy with the defender signing an initial two-year deal with the option for a further year.

=== Fiorentina ===
On 19 July 2024, Pongračić joined fellow Serie A club Fiorentina.

== International career ==
Eligible to represent Germany and Croatia, Pongračić was called up to a training camp for the Croatia U17s in 2014. He was capped three times on under-21 level, against Moldova, Austria and France. He was dropped from Croatia's squad for UEFA Under-21 Euro 2019 due to injuries.

He received his first call-up for the senior team on 17 August 2020 for September Nations League fixtures against Portugal and France. However, ten days later, he withdrew from the squad due to mononucleosis and was replaced by Mile Škorić.

He was called up once again on 4 November for same-month fixtures against Turkey, Sweden and Portugal. He made his debut on 11 November in a friendly 3–3 draw with Turkey, having been named in the starting lineup.

On 17 May 2021, Pongračić was named in the preliminary 34-man squad for the UEFA Euro 2020, but did not make the final 26.

On 31 October 2022, he was named in the preliminary 34-man squad for the 2022 FIFA World Cup, but did not make the final 26 again.

On 18 May 2026, Pongračić was selected in the 26-man squad for the 2026 FIFA World Cup.

== Personal life ==
Pongračić was born in Landshut, Germany. His parents Stribor and Anđelka fled from Slavonski Brod, Croatia to Germany during the Croatian War of Independence.

Pongračić named Kalidou Koulibaly and Virgil van Dijk his football idols. He is also a fan of Dinamo Zagreb.

== Career statistics ==
=== Club ===
As of match played 18 October 2026

Appearances and goals by club, season and competition
Club	Season	League			National cup (Note: Includes Austrian Cup, DFB-Pokal, Coppa Italia)		Europe		Other		Total	
Club	Season	Division	Apps	Goals	Apps	Goals	Apps	Goals	Apps	Goals	Apps	Goals
1860 Munich II	2016–17	Regionalliga Bayern	17	1	—		—		—		17	1
1860 Munich	2016–17	2. Bundesliga	6	0	—		—		1 (Note: Appearance in 2. Bundesliga relegation play-offs)	0	7	0
Red Bull Salzburg	2017–18	Austrian Bundesliga	16	0	3	0	4 (Note: Appearance(s) in UEFA Europa League)	0	—		23	0
Red Bull Salzburg	2018–19	Austrian Bundesliga	14	0	2	0	10 (Note: Four appearances in UEFA Champions League, six appearances in UEFA Europa League)	0	—		26	0
Red Bull Salzburg	2019–20	Austrian Bundesliga	5	0	1	0	1 (Note: Appearance(s) in UEFA Champions League)	0	—		7	0
Red Bull Salzburg	Total		35	0	6	0	15	0	—		56	0
VfL Wolfsburg	2019–20	Bundesliga	11	2	—		1	0	—		12	2
VfL Wolfsburg	2020–21	Bundesliga	10	0	1	0	—		—		11	0
VfL Wolfsburg	Total		21	2	1	0	1	0	—		23	2
Borussia Dortmund (loan)	2021–22	Bundesliga	17	0	1	0	5	0	—		23	0
Lecce (loan)	2022–23	Serie A	9	0	—		—		—		9	0
Lecce	2023–24	Serie A	36	0	2	0	—		—		38	0
Lecce	Lecce total		45	0	2	0	—		—		47	0
Fiorentina	2024–25	Serie A	20	0	0	0	8 (Note: Appearances in UEFA Conference League)	0	—		28	0
Fiorentina	2025–26	Serie A	35	0	1	0	12	1	—		48	1
Fiorentina	2026–27	Serie A	4	1	2	0	—		—		6	1
Fiorentina	Total		59	1	3	0	20	1	—		82	2
Career total			200	4	13	0	41	1	1	0	254	5

=== International ===
As of match played 29 September 2026

Appearances and goals by national team and year
National team	Year	Apps	Goals
Croatia	2020	2	0
Croatia	2021	0	0
Croatia	2022	3	0
Croatia	2023	0	0
Croatia	2024	6	0
Croatia	2025	5	0
Croatia	2026	8	0
Total		24	0

== Honours ==
Red Bull Salzburg

- Austrian Bundesliga: 2017–18, 2018–19
- Austrian Cup: 2018–19
