= Hannes Wolf (footballer) =

Austrian footballer (born 1999)

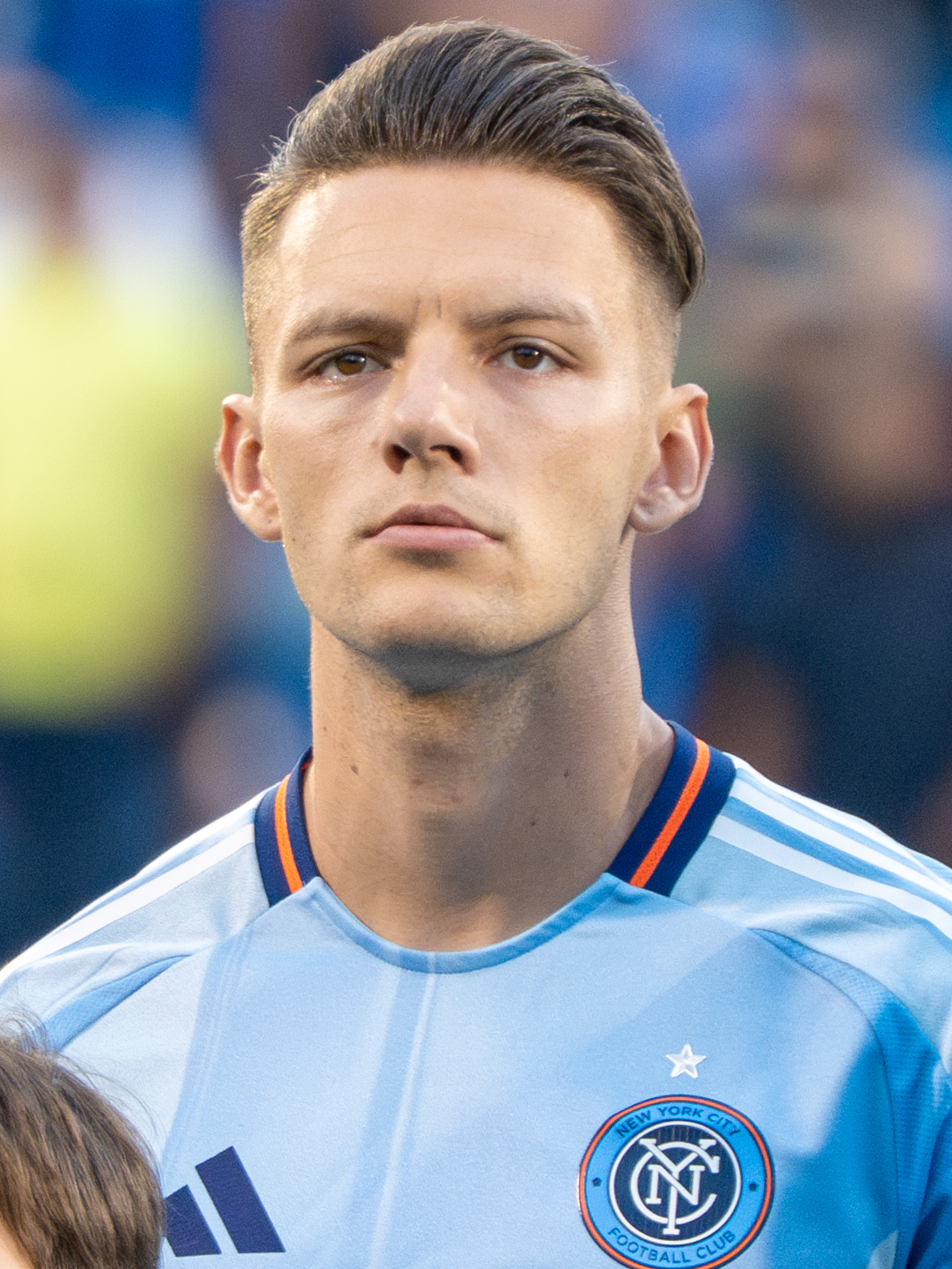
- Wolf with New York City FC in 2025

Personal information
- Full name: Hannes Tarn Wolf
- Date of birth: 16 April 1999 (age 27)
- Place of birth: Graz, Austria
- Height: 1.79 m (5 ft 10 in)
- Positions: Attacking midfielder; wide midfielder

Team information
- Current team: New York City FC
- Number: 17

Youth career
- 2004–2008: SC Seiersberg
- 2008–2012: SV Gössendorf
- 2012: USV Vasoldsberg
- 2012–2014: JAZ GU-Süd
- 2014–2016: Red Bull Salzburg

Senior career*
Years	Team	Apps	(Gls)
2016–2017	Liefering	35	(7)
2017–2019	Red Bull Salzburg	52	(16)
2019–2021	RB Leipzig	5	(0)
2020–2021	→ Borussia Mönchengladbach (loan)	32	(3)
2021–2024	Borussia Mönchengladbach	25	(1)
2022	→ Swansea City (loan)	19	(2)
2024–	New York City FC	84	(21)

International career
2015	Austria U16	3	(0)
2017–2020	Austria U21	15	(8)
- * Club domestic league appearances and goals as of 30 August 2026

Hannes Tarn Wolf (born 16 April 1999) is an Austrian professional footballer who plays as an attacking midfielder or wide midfielder for Major League Soccer club New York City.

== Club career ==
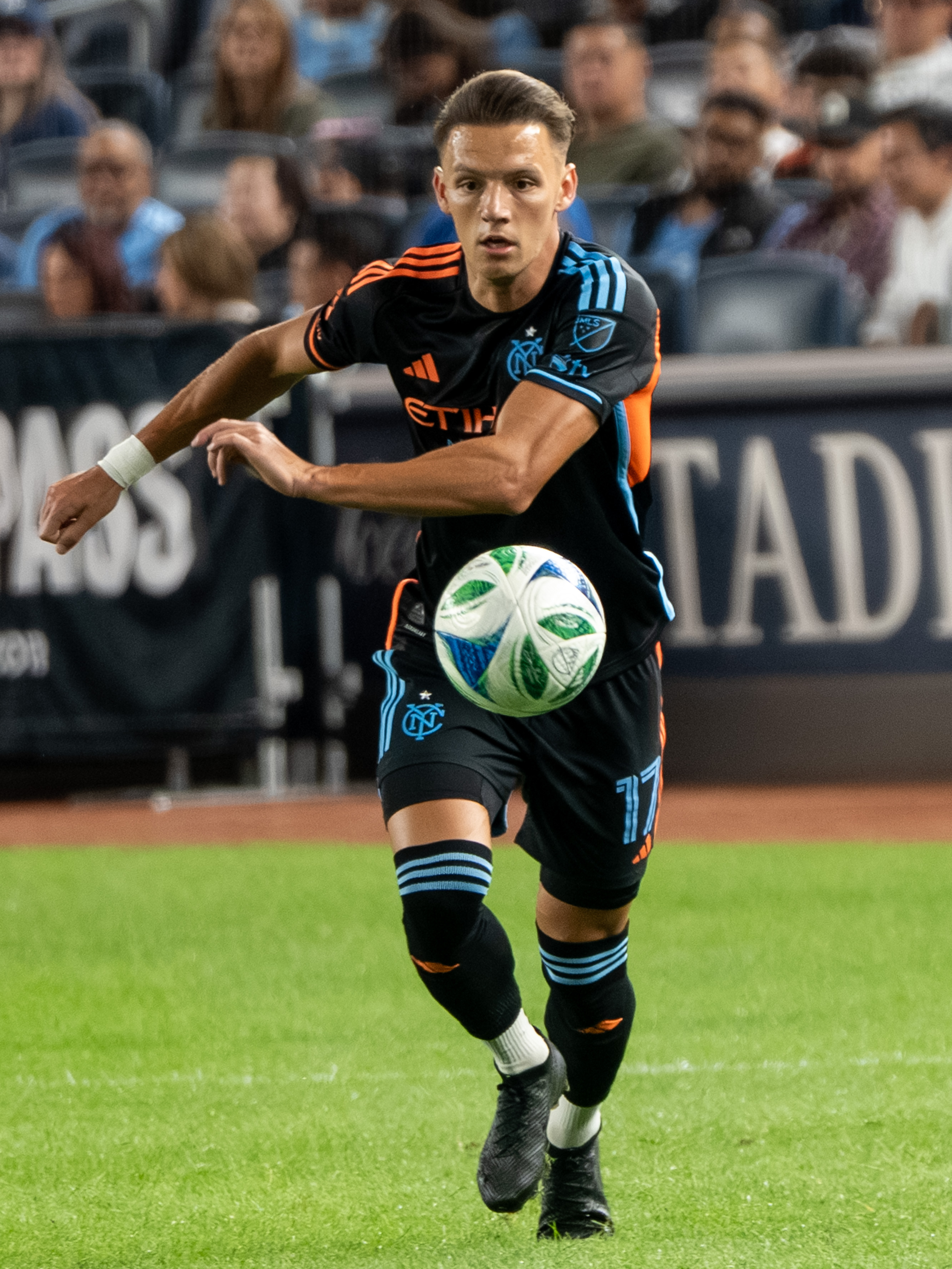
Hannes Wolf with New York City FC in 2025

=== RB Leipzig ===
On 23 January 2019, Red Bull Salzburg announced that they had sold Wolf to RB Leipzig from the upcoming 2019/20 season. Wolf penned a 5-year contract with the club.

Short after his arrival to RB Leipzig, Wolf suffered a horrendous leg break for Austria U21 at the European Under-21 Championships in June 2019, after giving his side the lead in the 2–0 victory.

=== Borussia Mönchengladbach ===
On 21 July 2020, Borussia Mönchengladbach announced the signing of Wolf on a loan deal from RB Leipzig until June 2021, with an option to buy at the end of the season. He had reunited with his former manager at Red Bull Salzburg, Marco Rose. In February 2021, the director of sports Max Eberl confirmed that the move was made permanent.

==== Swansea City (loan) ====
On 20 January 2022, Wolf joined EFL Championship club Swansea City on loan until the end of the season. He scored his first goal for the club in a 4–0 win as Swansea City completed the first ever League double in the South Wales derby over rivals Cardiff City.

=== New York City FC ===
On 16 January 2024, Wolf moved to the United States, signing a contract with Major League Soccer club New York City FC throughout 2027, with an option for an extra year.

== International career ==
He was called up to the Austria squad for the UEFA Nations League matches against Croatia, Denmark, France and on 3, 6, 10 and 13 June 2022 respectively.

== Career statistics ==
As of match played on 23 November 2024.

Appearances and goals by club, season and competition
Club	Season	League			National cup		Europe		Other		Total	
Club	Season	Division	Apps	Goals	Apps	Goals	Apps	Goals	Apps	Goals	Apps	Goals
Liefering	2015–16	Austrian First League	10	1	—		—		—		10	1
Liefering	2016–17	Austrian First League	25	6	—		—		—		25	6
Liefering	Total		35	7	—		—		—		35	7
Red Bull Salzburg	2016–17	Austrian Bundesliga	3	0	0	0	1 (Note: Appearance(s) in UEFA Europa League)	0	—		4	0
Red Bull Salzburg	2017–18	Austrian Bundesliga	27	8	5	3	13 (Note: Four appearances in UEFA Champions League, nine appearances and one goal in UEFA Europa League)	1	—		45	12
Red Bull Salzburg	2018–19	Austrian Bundesliga	22	8	4	2	14 (Note: Four appearances in UEFA Champions League, ten appearances and one goal in UEFA Europa League)	1	—		40	11
Red Bull Salzburg	Total		52	16	9	5	28	2	—		89	23
RB Leipzig	2019–20	Bundesliga	5	0	0	0	0	0	—		5	0
Borussia Mönchengladbach (loan)	2020–21	Bundesliga	32	3	4	1	7 (Note: Appearances in UEFA Champions League)	0	—		43	4
Borussia Mönchengladbach	2021–22	Bundesliga	7	0	1	0	—		—		8	0
Borussia Mönchengladbach	2022–23	Bundesliga	18	1	—		—		—		18	1
Borussia Mönchengladbach	2023–24	Bundesliga	0	0	0	0	—		—		0	0
Borussia Mönchengladbach	Total		25	1	1	0	—		—		26	1
Swansea City (loan)	2021–22	Championship	19	2	—		—		—		19	2
New York City FC	2024	Major League Soccer	34	5	—		—		8 (Note: Four appearances in Leagues Cup, four appearances in MLS Cup playoffs)	0	42	5
Career total			187	32	14	6	35	2	8	0	244	40

== Honours ==
Red Bull Salzburg Youth

- UEFA Youth League: 2016–17

Red Bull Salzburg

- Austrian Bundesliga: 2017–18, 2018–19
- Austrian Cup: 2018–19
