= Luca Meisl =

Austrian footballer (born 1999)

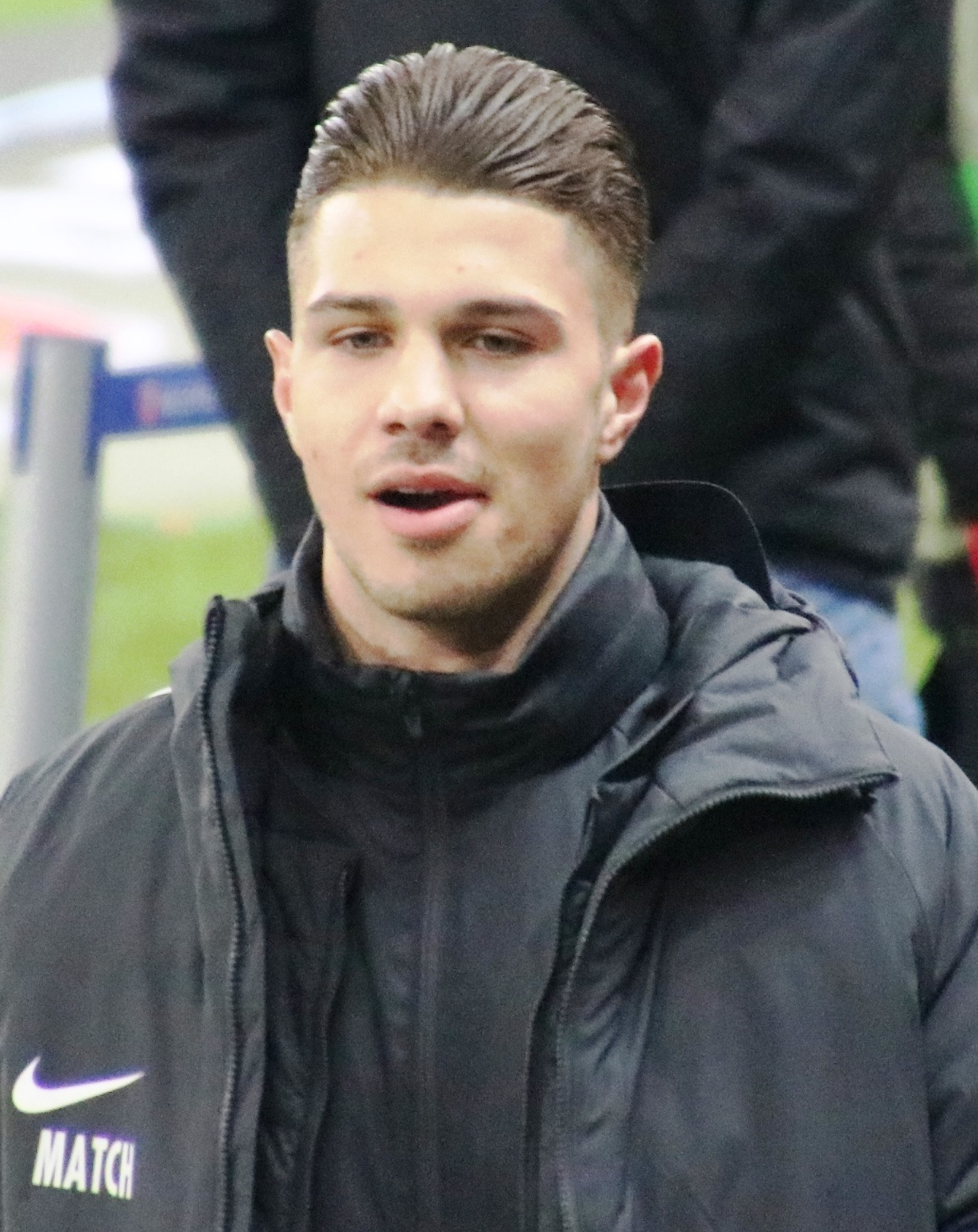
- Meisl in 2018

Personal information
- Full name: Luca Emanuel Meisl
- Date of birth: 4 March 1999 (age 27)
- Place of birth: Salzburg, Austria
- Height: 1.84 m (6 ft 0 in)
- Position: Centre-back

Team information
- Current team: Austria Salzburg
- Number: 55

Senior career*
Years	Team	Apps	(Gls)
2016–2020	FC Liefering	35	(1)
2017–2020	Red Bull Salzburg	1	(0)
2018–2020	→ SKN St. Pölten (loan)	39	(1)
2020–2022	SV Ried	47	(1)
2022–2024	Beerschot	26	(0)
2024	Austria Lustenau	8	(0)
2025–	Austria Salzburg	28	(1)

International career
2014	Austria U15	3	(0)
2014–2015	Austria U16	11	(2)
2015–2016	Austria U17	13	(0)
2016–2017	Austria U18	6	(0)
2017–2018	Austria U19	7	(0)
2019	Austria U21	1	(0)
- * Club domestic league appearances and goals as of 17 May 2026

Luca Emanuel Meisl (born 4 March 1999) is an Austrian professional footballer who plays as a centre-back for Austria Salzburg.

== Career ==
=== Club career ===
Meisl came up in the Red Bull Salzburg academy. He then played for FC Liefering. He scored a goal in 11 matches played during the 2016–17 season and no goals in 24 matches played in the 2017–18 season. He also made a league appearance and a cup appearance during the 2017–18 season for Red Bull Salzburg.

During the 2018–19 season he will play on loan for SKN St. Pölten.

On 1 September 2020 he signed with SV Ried.

On 8 January 2024, Meisl joined Austria Lustenau until June 2025.

=== International career ===
Meisl has played for Austria's U-16, U-17, U-18, and U-19 teams.

== Personal life ==
Meisl's younger brother Matteo is also a professional footballer.

== Career statistics ==
As of matches played on 2 August 2018.

Appearances and goals by club, season and competition
Club	Season	League			Cup (Note: Includes the Austrian Cup.)		Total	
Club	Season	Division	Apps	Goals	Apps	Goals	Apps	Goals
FC Liefering	2016–17	First League	11	1	—		11	1
FC Liefering	2017–18	First League	24	0	—		24	0
FC Liefering	Totals		35	1	—		35	1
Red Bull Salzburg	2017–18	Austrian Bundesliga	1	0	1	0	2	0
Red Bull Salzburg	Totals		1	0	1	0	2	0
SKN St. Pölten	2018–19	Austrian Bundesliga	1	0	1	0	2	0
Career totals			37	1	2	0	39	1
