= Dominik Burusic =

Austrian footballer

Personal information
- Full name: Dominik Burusic
- Date of birth: 17 March 1993 (age 33)
- Place of birth: Vienna, Austria
- Height: 1.79 m (5 ft 10 in)
- Position: Forward

Youth career
- 2009–2011: Bayern Munich

Senior career*
Years	Team	Apps	(Gls)
2011–2012	Bayern Munich II	2	(0)
2012–2015	Admira Wacker II	37	(22)
2013–2015	Admira Wacker	11	(0)
2015–2017	SV Stripfing		
2017–2019	Bruck/Leitha		
2019	SV Stripfing		
- * Club domestic league appearances and goals as of 6 October 2014

Dominik Burusic (born 17 March 1993) is an Austrian footballer.
