= Danijel Petrović =

Serbian footballer (born 1992)

Daniel Petrovic
Personal information
- Date of birth: 27 November 1992 (age 33)
- Place of birth: Linz, Austria
- Height: 1.85 m (6 ft 1 in)
- Position: Defender

Youth career
- 1999–2003: ATSV St. Martin bei Traun
- 2003–2007: FC Pasching Youth

Senior career*
Years	Team	Apps	(Gls)
2007–2009	FC Pasching II		
2009–2012	FC Pasching	34	(0)
2012	SK Vorwärts Steyr	11	(0)
2012–2013	USK Anif	15	(1)
2013	SC Ritzing	7	(0)
2013–2014	FC Blau-Weiß Linz	24	(4)
2014–2015	SK Vorwärts Steyr	24	(1)
2015–2020	SKN St. Pölten	73	(4)
- * Club domestic league appearances and goals as of 4 July 2020

Daniel Petrovic (born 27 November 1992) is a Serbian footballer. Petrovic plays as a defender.
