= Martin Rasner =

Austrian association football player

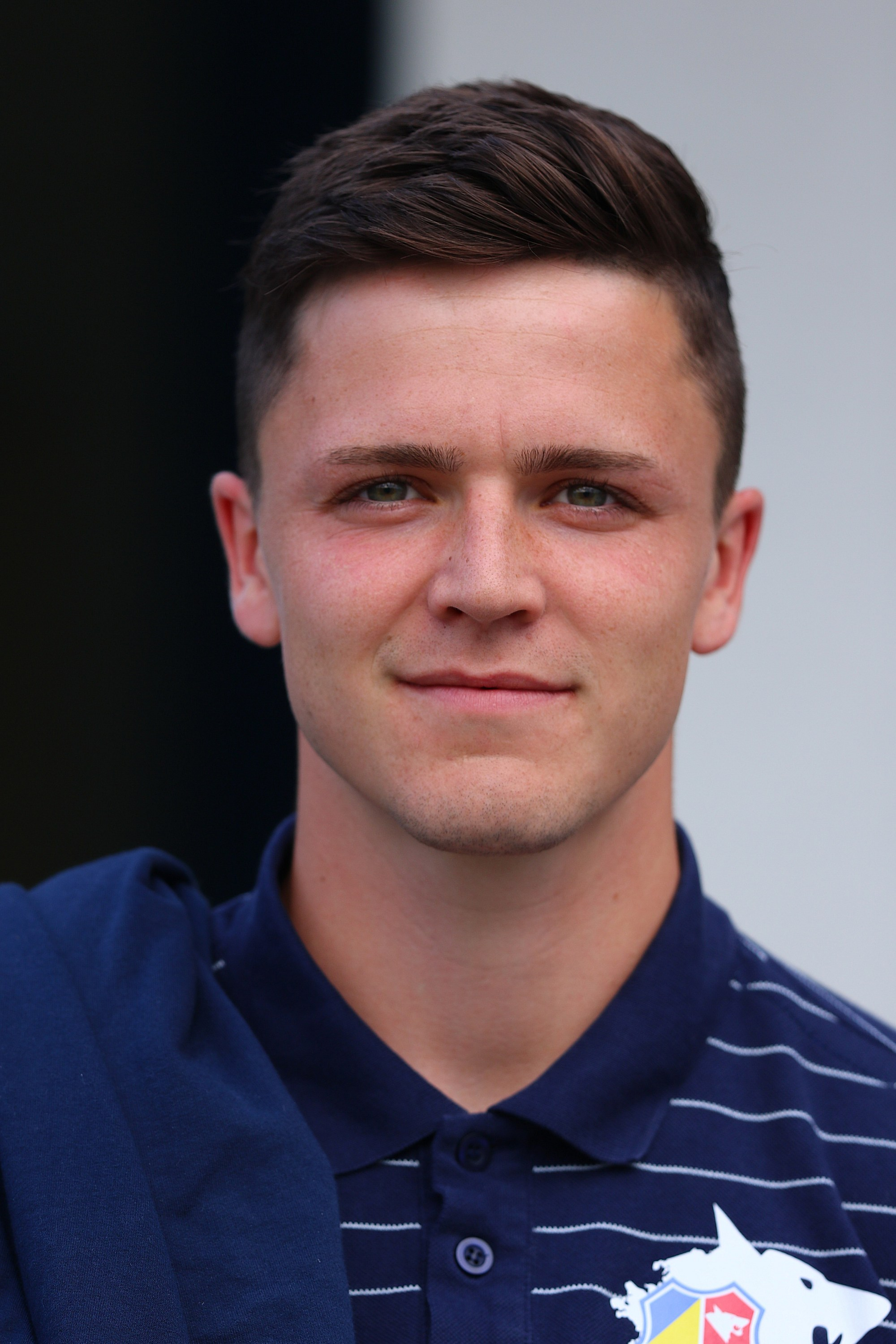

Personal information
- Date of birth: 18 May 1995 (age 31)
- Place of birth: Oberpullendorf, Austria
- Height: 1.77 m (5 ft 10 in)
- Position: Midfielder

Team information
- Current team: SV Ried
- Number: 8

Youth career
- 2003–2007: SK Wiesmath
- 2007–2008: SVSF Pottschach
- 2008–2013: SKN St. Pölten

Senior career*
Years	Team	Apps	(Gls)
2013–2015	FC Liefering	57	(1)
2015–2016	SV Grödig	33	(2)
2016–2017	1. FC Heidenheim	7	(0)
2017–2020	SKN St. Pölten	63	(1)
2021–2022	Floridsdorfer AC	42	(0)
2022–2024	Admira Wacker	47	(1)
2024–	SV Ried	52	(0)

International career^{‡}
2012–2013	Austria U18	5	(0)
2013–2014	Austria U19	13	(0)
2015	Austria U20	6	(0)
2015–2016	Austria U21	6	(0)
- * Club domestic league appearances and goals as of 10 June 2026 ‡ National team caps and goals as of 19 October 2024

Martin Rasner (born 18 May 1995) is an Austrian professional footballer who plays as a midfielder for SV Ried.

== Club career ==
Rasner joined recently relegated 2. Liga club Admira Wacker on 10 June 2022, signing a two-year contract.

On 29 May 2024, Rasner signed a two-season contract with SV Ried.

== International career ==
Rasner was a youth international for Austria.
