= 2016–17 Austrian Cup =

ÖFB Cup (German)

Tournament details
- Country: Austria
- Teams: 64

Final positions
- Champions: Red Bull Salzburg
- Runners-up: Rapid Wien

Tournament statistics
- Top goal scorer(s): Victor Sá (7 goals)

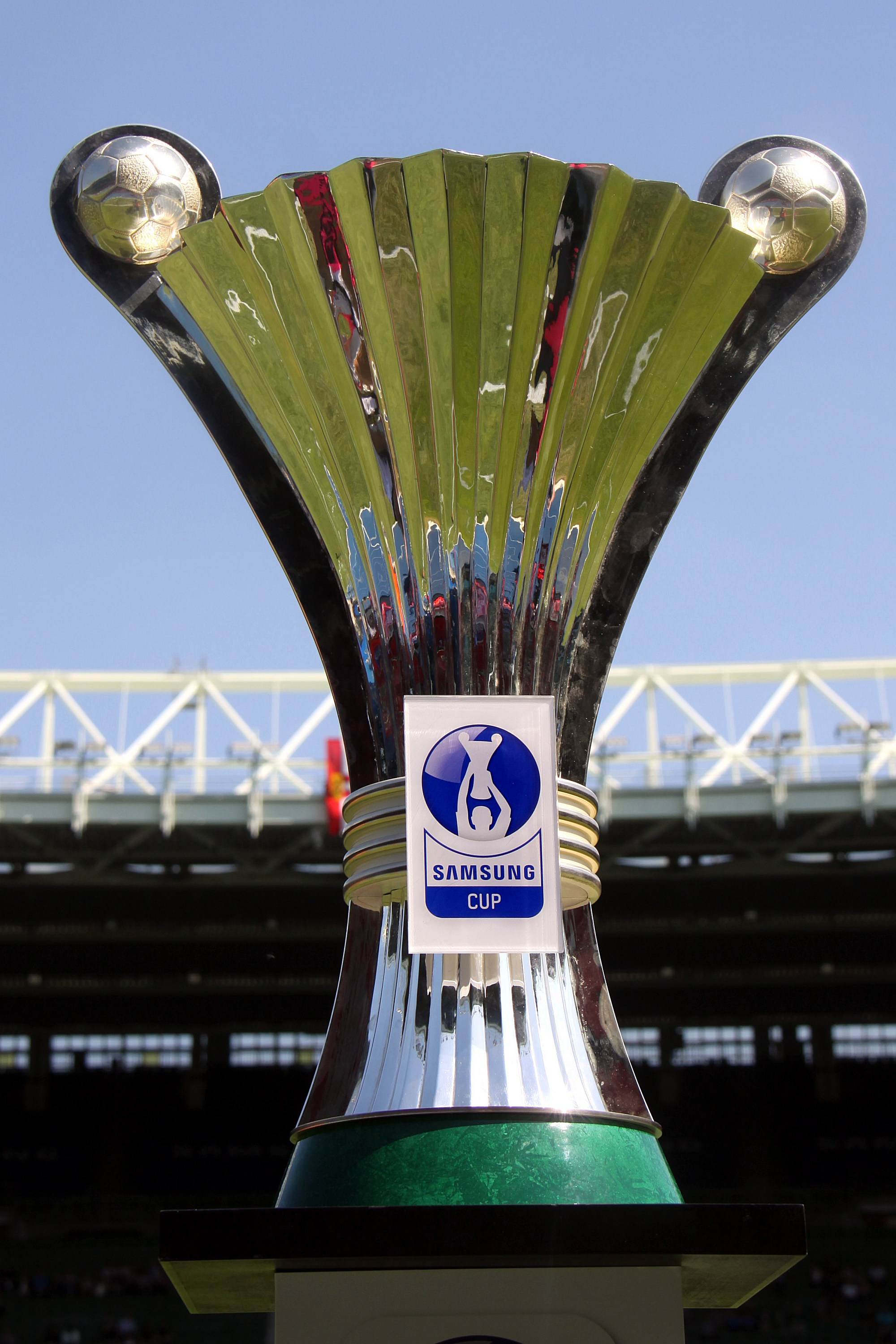
Trophy of the Austrian Cup

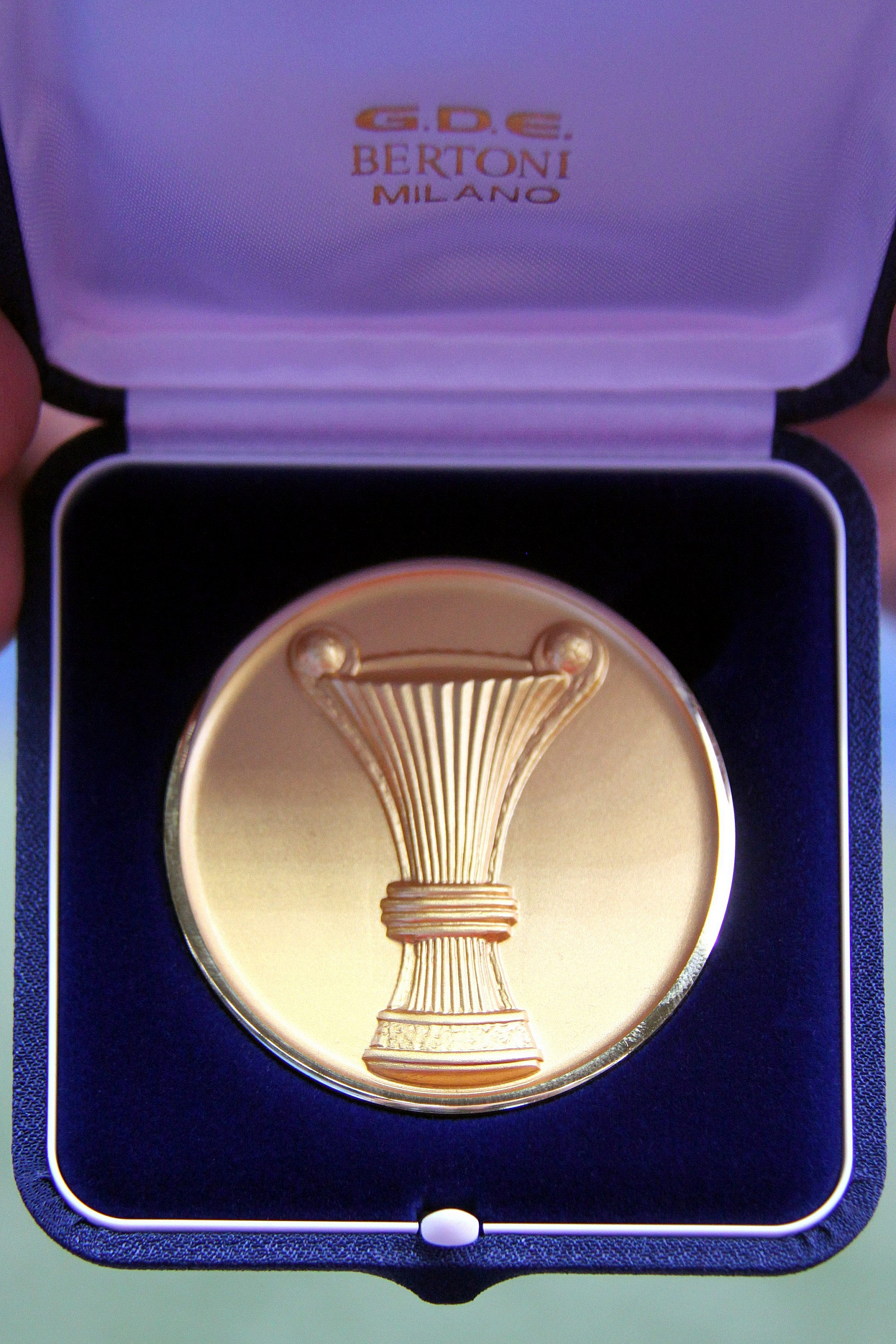
Medal for the players

The 2016–17 Austrian Cup (German: ÖFB-Samsung-Cup) was the 83rd season of Austria's nationwide football cup competition. It began with a First Round match between FC Karabakh Wien and Rapid Wien on 8 July 2016 and ended on 1 June 2017 with the final at Wörthersee Stadion in Klagenfurt. Red Bull Salzburg were the defending champions.

The cup winners were entitled to participate in the third qualification round of the 2017–18 UEFA Europa League.

== Participants ==
A total of 64 teams will participate in the competition. Clubs from the 2016–17 Bundesliga and 2016–17 First League are automatically qualified but, as Bundesliga reserve teams could theoretically participate in the First League, may only enter their first team. This means that First League members FC Liefering, while technically an independent entity, will not participate as they are fully controlled by Red Bull Salzburg. The remaining spots were distributed by a fixed scheme to amateur clubs from the nine Austrian regional football associations:

- 7 teams: Lower Austria
- 6 teams each: Upper Austria, Styria
- 5 teams: Vienna
- 4 teams each: Burgenland, Carinthia, Salzburg, Tyrol, Vorarlberg

For each regional association, the respective cup winners and, if applicable, losing teams from the relegation play-offs between First League and the Regional Leagues are obliged to participate.

Bundesliga	First League	Regional Cup winners
FC Admira Wacker Mödling; SC Rheindorf Altach; SK Sturm Graz; SV Mattersburg; SV Ried; FC Red Bull Salzburg; SKN St. Pölten; FK Austria Wien; SK Rapid Wien; Wolfsberger AC	Floridsdorfer AC; SV Horn; FC Wacker Innsbruck; Kapfenberger SV; FC Blau-Weiß Linz; LASK Linz; SC Austria Lustenau; WSG Wattens; SC Wiener Neustadt; ~~FC Liefering~~	USV Rudersdorf (Burgenland); SK Treibach (Carinthia); SVg Purgstall (Lower Austria); USK Anif (Salzburg); SV Lafnitz (Styria); FC Kitzbühel (Tyrol); SK Bad Wimsbach (Upper Austria); FC Karabakh Wien (Vienna); Dornbirner SV (Vorarlberg)
Regional League East	Regional League Central	Regional League West
SKU Amstetten; ASK Ebreichsdorf; SC Mannsdorf; SC Neusiedl am See 1919; SC-ESV Parndorf 1919; SC Ritzing; FC Stadlau; FCM Traiskirchen; First Vienna FC; Wiener Sport-Club	USV Allerheiligen; Deutschlandsberger SC; FC Gleisdorf 09; SV Grieskirchen; Union Gurten; TSV Hartberg; SC Kalsdorf; SK Austria Klagenfurt; ATSV Stadl-Paura; Union St. Florian; SK Vorwärts Steyr; ATSV Wolfsberg	FC Dornbirn 1913; SV Grödig; FC Hard; VfB Hohenems; FC Kufstein; SV Austria Salzburg; TSV St. Johann; SC Schwaz; SV Wörgl
Landesliga	Notes	
FC Bergheim; ATUS Ferlach; Kremser SC; SV Leobendorf; SV Wienerberg	1. Note 1 – While FC Liefering technically is an independent entity, the club is fully controlled by Red Bull Salzburg and therefore viewed as the reserve team of Red Bull.; 2. Note 2 – USV Rudersdorf will participate as runners-up of the Burgenland cup competition as winners SC/ESV Parndorf 1919 are already qualified via their final position in the 2015–16 Regional League East.; 3. Note 3 – FC Kitzbühel will participate as runners-up of the Tyrol cup competition as winners WSG Wattens are already qualified after their First League promotion.; 4. Note 4 – Dornbirner SV will participate as runners-up of the Voralberg cup competition as winners FC Dornbirn 1913 are already qualified via their final position in the 2015–16 Regional League West.; 5. Note 5 – Despite winning the Wiener Stadtliga title, SV Wienerberg declined promotion to the Regional League East.	

== Scheduled dates ==
The schedule are as follows:

- First round: 8, 15–17 July 2016
- Second round: 20–21 September 2016
- Third round: 25–26 October 2016
- Quarterfinals: 4–5 April 2017
- Semifinals: 25–26 April 2017
- Final: 1 June 2017 at Klagenfurt

== First round ==
The draw for this round was conducted on 20 June 2016 in Paris, France. The reason for this rather exceptional place was that all leaders of the Austrian Football Association were in the city due to the UEFA Euro 2016. The matches were drawn by actress and model Davia Martelli.

Matches for this round were determined on regional criteria. The 45 amateur clubs from the Regional Leagues and below were split into two groups, with the Eastern group consisting of 26 teams from Vienna, Lower Austria, Burgenland, Styria and Carinthia and the Western group comprising 19 teams from Upper Austria, Salzburg, Tyrol and Vorarlberg. In a first step, seven matches between members of the Eastern group and six matches among Western group participants were drawn before each of the remaining clubs were paired with one of the professional teams.

Fixtures of this round will be played on 15–17 July 2016 with the exception of the match between FC Karabakh and SK Rapid which had been moved to 8 July 2016 due to the opening of the Allianz Stadion.

(All times given in CEST)

8 July 2016	FC Karabakh Wien (4)	1–3	SK Rapid Wien (1)	Vienna
19:30	Kara 90'	Report	22' Joelinton; 53' Hofmann; 67' Schwab	Stadium: Sportclub-Platz; Attendance: 3,500; Referee: Julian Weinberger

15 July 2016	FC Stadlau (3)	0–2	SK Sturm Graz (1)	Vienna
17:30		Report	77', 93' Kienast	Stadium: Sportplatz Stadlau; Attendance: 500; Referee: Oliver Drachta

15 July 2016	SC Kalsdorf (3)	4–0	SK Austria Klagenfurt (3)	Kalsdorf bei Graz
19:00	Fischer 21'; Pein 33', 90'; Frljuzec 60'	Report		Stadium: Sportzentrum Kalsdorf; Attendance: 200; Referee: Alain Sadlikovski

15 July 2016	Deutschlandsberger SC (3)	1–3	SV Lafnitz (3)	Deutschlandsberg
19:00	Kordic 86'	Report	38', 84' Waldl; 60' Tomka	Stadium: Koralmstadion; Attendance: 350; Referee: Aldin Hasanovic

15 July 2016	First Vienna FC (3)	6–0	SK Treibach (4)	Vienna
19:00	Stehlik 26'; Katzer 34'; Kurtisi 37', 62', 83'; Keles 55'	Report		Stadium: Hohe Warte; Attendance: 560; Referee: Gabriel Gmeiner

15 July 2016	FC Gleisdorf 09 (3)	2–2 (a.e.t.) (3–5 p)	TSV Hartberg (3)	Gleisdorf
19:00	Ostermann 21'; Farnleitner 112'	Report	90' Mislov; 98' Vaschauner	Stadium: Solarstadion; Attendance: 700; Referee: Günter Messner
	Penalties
	Gräfischer (penalty scored); Spreco (penalty scored); Ostermann (penalty missed); Färber (penalty scored)		(penalty scored) Gollner; (penalty scored) Vaschauner; (penalty scored) Tadić; (penalty scored) Kröpfl; (penalty scored) Rasswalder

15 July 2016	SK Bad Wimsbach (5)	3–1	SV Austria Salzburg (3)	Bad Wimsbach-Neydharting
19:00	Gruber 25'; Plasser 35', 75'	Report	64' Rekic	Stadium: Stadion Bad Wimsbach; Attendance: 950; Referee: Thomas Wieser

15 July 2016	ASK Ebreichsdorf (3)	1–0	Wolfsberger AC (1)	Ebreichsdorf
19:00	Markic 39'	Report		Stadium: Sportzentrum Ebreichsdorf; Attendance: 600; Referee: Alexander Harkam

15 July 2016	ATSV Wolfsberg (3)	0–3	Floridsdorfer AC (2)	Wolfsberg
19:00		Report	40' Hirschhofer; 59' Sahanek; 77' Grbic	Stadium: ATSV Arena; Attendance: 209; Referee: Rene Eisner

15 July 2016	SC-ESV Parndorf 1919 (3)	2–3 (a.e.t.)	LASK (2)	Parndorf
19:00	Silberbauer 67'; Karner 90+2'	Report	36' Fabiano; 41', 115' Rep	Stadium: Heidebodenstadion; Attendance: 500; Referee: Harald Lechner

15 July 2016	SV Grieskirchen (3)	0–2	SC Wiener Neustadt (2)	Grieskirchen
19:00		Report	50' Rusek; 84' Fischer	Stadium: Trattnachtalstadion; Attendance: 250; Referee: Christian-Petru Ciochirca

15 July 2016	SC Neusiedl am See 1919 (3)	3–5 (a.e.t.)	WSG Wattens (2)	Neusiedl am See
19:00	Wang 8'; Markus 31', 105'	Report	59', 96' Jurdik; 65' Pranter; 106' Nitzlnader; 122' Shazad	Stadium: Sportzentrum Neusiedl; Attendance: 348; Referee: Lukas Gnam

15 July 2016	SKU Amstetten (3)	3–0 (a.e.t.)	SV Wienerberg (4)	Amstetten
19:30	Vuković 103'; Lachmayr 110'; Zefi 117'	Report		Stadium: Ertl Glas Stadion; Attendance: 720; Referee: Achim Untergasser

15 July 2016	Wiener Sport-Club (3)	0–3	SC Ritzing (3)	Vienna
19:30		Report	57', 87' Witteveen; 60' Wolf	Stadium: Sportclub-Platz; Attendance: 1,063; Referee: Julia Baier

15 July 2016	Kremser SC (4)	0–2	SKN St. Pölten (1)	Krems an der Donau
19:30		Report	52' Thürauer; 63' Mader	Stadium: Sepp-Doll-Stadion

15 July 2016	SVG Purgstall (6)	0–6	Kapfenberger SV (2)	Purgstall an der Erlauf
19:30		Report	12' Petrović; 25', 57' Elias; 35' (pen.) Victor Sá; 77' Schagerl; 81' Flecker	Stadium: Fliederstadion; Attendance: 550; Referee: Benjamin Praschl

15 July 2016	SK Vorwärts Steyr (3)	1–3	FC Red Bull Salzburg (1)	Steyr
20:30	Gotthartsleitner 93'	Report	61' (pen.) Lainer; 78' Bernardo; 92' Minamino	Stadium: Vorwärtsstadion; Attendance: 3,700; Referee: Markus Hameter

16 July 2016	SV Leobendorf (4)	0–0 (a.e.t.) (3–1 p)	USV Allerheiligen (3)	Leobendorf
16:45		Report		Stadium: Franz Haas-Stadion; Attendance: 250; Referee: Josef Spurny
	Penalties
	Konrad (penalty scored); Leuchtmann (penalty scored); Babic (penalty scored)		(penalty scored) Maritschnegg; (penalty missed) Rupp; (penalty missed) Kelenc; (penalty missed) Koinegg

16 July 2016	VfB Hohenems (3)	0–4	SV Grödig (3)	Hohenems
17:00		Report	22', 27' Wallner; 24', 35' Gruber	Stadium: Herrenriedsstadion; Attendance: 500; Referee: Engin Isgören

16 July 2016	ATUS Ferlach (4)	1–6	SC Austria Lustenau (2)	Ferlach
17:00	Stückler 66'	Report	9', 82' Dwamena; 38' (pen.), 64', 78' (pen.) Wießmeier; 87' Durmus	Stadium: Sportplatz ATUS Ferlach; Attendance: 500; Referee: Dieter Muckenhammer

16 July 2016	USK Anif (3)	0–1	SC Rheindorf Altach (1)	Anif
17:00		Report	Dovedan 13'	Stadium: Sportzentrum Anif; Attendance: 300; Referee: Walter Altmann

16 July 2016	FC Hard (3)	0–1	Union St. Florian (3)	Hard
17:30		Report	Mittermayr 14'	Stadium: Waldstadion; Attendance: 300; Referee: Reinhold Fischer

16 July 2016	TSV St. Johann (3)	0–3	Union Gurten (3)	St. Johann im Pongau
18:00		Report	24' Wirth; 53' Hirsch; 81' (pen.) Wimmleitner	Stadium: Alpenarena St. Johann; Attendance: 200; Referee: Felix Ouschan

16 July 2016	SC Schwaz (3)	4–3	FC Bergheim (4)	Schwaz
18:00	Schuler 62'; Wildauer 64'; Essl 82'; Harmanci 84'	Report	16' (pen.), 90+1' Peter; 42' Högler	Stadium: Silberstadt-Arena; Attendance: 250; Referee: Stefan Ebner

16 July 2016	ATSV Stadl-Paura (3)	0–1	FC Blau-Weiß Linz (2)	Stadl-Paura
18:00		Report	Gabriel 2'	Stadium: Maximilian-Pagl-Stadion; Attendance: 554; Referee: Helmut Trattnig

16 July 2016	FC Kufstein (3)	1–4	SV Ried (1)	Kufstein
19:00	Treichl 11' (pen.)	Report	35', 57', 58' Walch; 60' Fröschl	Stadium: Kufstein Arena; Attendance: 500; Referee: Michael Baumann

16 July 2016	FCM Traiskirchen (3)	1–3	SV Horn (2)	Traiskirchen
19:30	Steinacher 8'	Report	47' Pranjic; 60' Takougnadi; 85' Zatl	Stadium: Sportzentrum Traiskirchen; Attendance: 300; Referee: Sebastian Gishamer

17 July 2016	Dornbirner SV (4)	1–4	FC Admira Wacker Mödling (1)	Dornbirn
10:30	Erhart 90'	Report	18' Vastić; 56', 83' Monschein; 86' Blutsch	Stadium: Sportplatz Dornbirner SV; Attendance: 600; Referee: Andreas Heiss

17 July 2016	FC Dornbirn 1913 (3)	0–6	FK Austria Wien (1)	Dornbirn
15:30		Report	17' Kvasina; 30', 37' Kahat; 47' Pires; 56' Tajouri; 68' Serbest	Stadium: Stadion Birkenwiese; Attendance: 2,200; Referee: Christopher Jäger

17 July 2016	USV Rudersdorf (5)	0–7	SV Mattersburg (1)	Rudersdorf
17:00		Report	11' Grgić; 16' Bürger; 26' Röcher; 59', 69' Ibser; 73' Seidl; 88' Templ	Stadium: Sportplatz Rudersdorf; Attendance: 804; Referee: Alan Kijas

17 July 2016	SV Wörgl (3)	2–4 (a.e.t.)	FC Kitzbühel (3)	Wörgl
17:30	Kostadinovic 24', 73' (pen.)	Report	59', 67' Pauli; 95' (pen.) Hartl; 102' Gartner	Stadium: Sportzentrum Wörgl; Attendance: 650; Referee: Arnes Talic

17 July 2016	SC Mannsdorf (3)	3–3 (a.e.t.) (4–3 p)	FC Wacker Innsbruck (2)	Mannsdorf an der Donau
18:00	Panic 25', 69'; Saurer 109'	Report	40', 105' Holenstein; 51' Jamnig	Stadium: Aulandstadion; Attendance: 1,000; Referee: Manuel Schüttengruber
	Penalties
	Saurer (penalty scored); Steigberger (penalty scored); Prettenthaler (penalty missed); Panic (penalty scored); Weissensteier (penalty scored)		(penalty missed) Hamzic; (penalty scored) Hesina; (penalty missed) Säumel; (penalty scored) Holenstein; (penalty scored) Pichlmann

== Second round ==
(All times given in CEST)

20 September 2016	SC Schwaz (3)	0–1	Floridsdorfer AC (2)	Schwaz
18:00		Report	Grbic 27'	Stadium: Silberstadt-Arena; Attendance: 350; Referee: Felix Ouschan

20 September 2016	FC Kitzbühel (3)	1–2	FC Blau-Weiß Linz (2)	Kitzbühel
18:30	Richards 50'	Report	Pecirep 21'; Falk 81'	Stadium: Sportplatz Langau; Attendance: 500; Referee: Robert Schörgenhofer

20 September 2016	Union Gurten (3)	2–4	Kapfenberger SV (2)	Gurten
19:00	Zirnitzer 36'; Feichtinger 73' (pen.)	Report	Schnaitter 52' (o.g.); Frieser 57' (pen.); Ritscher 81'; Arimany 87'	Stadium: Park21-Arena; Attendance: 650; Referee: Walter Altmann

20 September 2016	SKN St. Pölten (1)	2–1	SV Ried (1)	Sankt Pölten
19:00	Segovia 13'; Keita 39'	Report	Fröschl 49'	Stadium: NV-Arena; Attendance: 1,050; Referee: Christopher Jäger

20 September 2016	SC Kalsdorf (3)	1–2	LASK (2)	Kalsdorf
19:00	Ulrich 61'	Report	Gartler 4'; Otter 77' (o.g.)	Stadium: Sportzentrum; Attendance: 800; Referee: Sebastian Gishamer

20 September 2016	TSV Hartberg (3)	1–1 (a.e.t.) (4–5 p)	WSG Wattens (2)	Hartberg
19:00	Tadic 29' (pen.)	Report	Jurdik 51' (pen.)	Stadium: Profertil-Arena; Attendance: 800; Referee: Helmut Trattnig
	Penalties
	Gollner (penalty scored); Vaschauner (penalty scored); Kröpfl (penalty scored); Gölles (penalty missed); Rasswalder (penalty scored)		(penalty scored) Gebauer; (penalty scored) Pranter; (penalty scored) Nitzlnader; (penalty scored) Popp; (penalty scored) Neurauter

20 September 2016	SV Grödig (3)	2–2 (a.e.t.) (4–2 p)	SV Horn (2)	Grödig
19:00	Felser 55'; Lukacevic 96'		Orsini 90+3'; Đorđević 101' (pen.)	Stadium: Untersberg Arena; Attendance: 250; Referee: Christian-Petru Ciochirca
	Penalties
	Gruber (penalty missed); Felser (penalty scored); Jutric (penalty scored); Kircher (penalty scored); Strobl (penalty scored)		(penalty scored) Ljubic; (penalty scored) Yajima; (penalty missed) Vallci; (penalty missed) Đorđević

20 September 2016	Union St. Florian (3)	0–3 (a.e.t.)	SC Wiener Neustadt (2)	Sankt Florian
19:30		Report	Stefel 105'; Gschweidl 119', 120'	Stadium: Sportpark; Attendance: 100; Referee: Andreas Kollegger

20 September 2016	SKU Amstetten (3)	2–2 (a.e.t.) (3–2 p)	SC Austria Lustenau (2)
19:30	Keusch 13'; Lachmayr 90+3'		Haring 11' (pen.); Dwamena 81'
	Penalties
	Vuković (penalty scored); Teurezbacher (penalty scored); Haider-Madl (penalty missed); Achleitner (penalty scored)		(penalty scored) Stückler; (penalty missed) Stark; (penalty missed) Dwamena; (penalty scored) Krainz; (penalty missed) Knett

21 September 2016	SV Leobendorf (4)	0–1	SK Rapid Wien (1)	Wien
18:00		Report	Schösswendter 50'	Stadium: Sportclub-Platz; Attendance: 3,204; Referee: Alexander Harkam

21 September 2016	SK Bad Wimsbach (5)	0–5	SK Sturm Graz (1)	Bad Wimsbach
18:30			Schoissengeyr 29'; Dobras 57'; Kronberger 70' (o.g.); Kienast 80'; Alar 90'	Stadium: Hofmaninger Stadion; Attendance: 2,400; Referee: Markus Hameter

21 September 2016	SV Lafnitz (3)	0–0 (a.e.t.) (4–3 p)	SV Mattersburg (1)	Lafnitz
19:00		Report		Stadium: Sportplatz; Attendance: 1,050; Referee: Alan Kijas
	Penalties
	Feiner (penalty scored); Friedl (penalty scored); Wagner (penalty scored); Rodler (penalty scored)		(penalty scored) Bürger; (penalty scored) Jano; (penalty scored) Röcher; (penalty missed) Grgic; (penalty missed) Höller

21 September 2016	SC Mannsdorf (3)	1–7	Red Bull Salzburg (1)	Mannsdorf
19:00	Casanova 25'	Report	Rzatkowski 2'; Sörensen 20'; Hwang 22'; Lainer 35'; Dabbur 42', 85'; Yabo 90' (pen.)	Stadium: Aulandstadion; Attendance: 2,000; Referee: Oliver Drachta

21 September 2016	ASK Ebreichsdorf (3)	3–0	SC Rheindorf Altach (1)	Ebreichsdorf
19:00	Bauer 5'; Pinter 19'; Markic 28'	Report		Stadium: Sportzentrum; Attendance: 1,200; Referee: Manuel Schüttengruber

21 September 2016	SC Ritzing (3)	1–3	FC Admira Wacker Mödling (1)	Ritzing
19:30	Plank 42'	Report	Monschein 3', 17', 69'	Stadium: Sonnensee-Stadion; Attendance: 600; Referee: Dieter Muckenhammer

21 September 2016	First Vienna FC (3)	1–3 (a.e.t.)	FK Austria Wien (1)	Wien
20:20	Schibany 34'		Kayode 56', 108'; Tajouri 117'	Stadium: Hohe Warte; Attendance: 3,150; Referee: Harald Lechner

== Third round ==
(All times given in CEST)

25 October 2016	SV Grödig (3)	1–0	WSG Wattens (2)	Grödig
18:30	Jukić 75'	Report		Stadium: Untersberg Arena; Attendance: 300; Referee: Robert Schörgenhofer

25 October 2016	SC Wiener Neustadt (2)	1–3	FC Admira Wacker Mödling (1)	Wiener Neustadt
19:00	Rusek 73'	Report	Schmidt 4'; Bajrami 44'; Wostry 52'	Stadium: Stadion; Attendance: 1,200; Referee: Alan Kijas

25 October 2016	SV Lafnitz (3)	1–5	Kapfenberger SV (2)
19:00	Tomka 31'	Report	Victor Sá 43', 56', 58', 66' (pen.); Geissler 88'

25 October 2016	SKU Amstetten (3)	3–4 (a.e.t.)	LASK (2)	Amstetten
19:30	Lachmayr 40'; Affengruber 33' (o.g.); Lageder 87' (o.g.)	Report	Fabiano 8'; Affengruber 33' (o.g.); Lageder 87' (o.g.); Gartler 51'; Reiter 96'	Stadium: Ertl Glas-Stadion; Attendance: 2,500; Referee: Christopher Jäger

26 October 2016	ASK Ebreichsdorf (3)	4–5 (a.e.t.)	FK Austria Wien (1)	Ebreichsdorf
11:00	Hatzl 76'; Bauer 86'; Pomer 90+2'; Vukajlovic 112'	Report	Venuto 7'; Rotpuller 14'; Friesenbichler 68', 101'; Pires 102'	Stadium: Sportzentrum; Attendance: 3,800; Referee: Rene Eisner

26 October 2016	Red Bull Salzburg (1)	2–0	Floridsdorfer AC (2)	Wals-Siezenheim
16:00	Yabo 7'; Dabbur 34'	Report		Stadium: Red Bull Arena; Attendance: 2,834; Referee: Walter Altmann

26 October 2016	SKN St. Pölten (1)	1–1 (a.e.t.) (4–3 p)	SK Sturm Graz (1)	Sankt Pölten
16:30	Thürauer 31'	Report	Schmerböck 50'	Stadium: NV- Arena; Attendance: 2,447; Referee: Dieter Muckenhammer
	Penalties
	Ambichl (penalty scored); Schütz (penalty scored); Mader (penalty missed); Keita (penalty scored); Lumu (penalty scored)		(penalty scored) Kienast; (penalty scored) Jeggo; (penalty missed) Matić; (penalty scored) Hierländer; (penalty missed) Spendlhofer

26 October 2016	FC Blau-Weiß Linz (2)	0–4	SK Rapid Wien (1)	Wien
20:15		Report	Schaub 7'; Murg 23'; Kvilitaia 33'; Jelić 58'	Stadium: Sportclub-Platz; Attendance: 3,187; Referee: Markus Hameter

== Quarter-finals ==
(All times given in CEST)

4 April 2017	SV Grödig (3)	0–3	LASK (2)	Grödig
20:30		Report	Rep 64'; Imbongo 88'; Fabiano 90+1'	Stadium: Untersberg-Arena; Attendance: 1,260; Referee: Rene Eisner

5 April 2017	FK Austria Wien (1)	1–2	FC Admira Wacker Mödling (1)	Vienna
18:00	Friesenbichler 34'	Report	Knasmüllner 6'; Monschein 14'	Stadium: Ernst-Happel-Stadion; Attendance: 5,054; Referee: Dieter Muckenhammer

5 April 2017	Red Bull Salzburg (1)	2–1 (a.e.t.)	Kapfenberger SV (2)	Wals-Siezenheim
19:00	Radošević 21'; Haidara 111'	Report	Victor Sá 8'	Stadium: Red Bull Arena; Attendance: 2,856; Referee: Gerhard Grobelnik

5 April 2017	SKN St. Pölten (1)	1–3	SK Rapid Wien (1)	St. Pölten
20:30	Wöber 90+6' (o.g.)	Report	Wöber 18'; Pavelić 73'; Kvilitaia 83'	Stadium: NV Arena; Attendance: 6,721; Referee: Oliver Drachta

== Semi-finals ==
The draw for the semifinals took place on 9 April. (All times given in CEST)

26 April 2017	FC Admira Wacker Mödling (1)	0–5	Red Bull Salzburg (1)	Maria Enzersdorf
18:00		Report	Minamino 7', 87'; Wanderson 29'; Laimer 48'; Lazaro 60'	Stadium: BSFZ-Arena; Attendance: 2,500; Referee: Julian Weinberger

26 April 2017	SK Rapid Wien (1)	2–1	LASK (2)	Vienna
20:30	Murg 76'; Joelinton 90+3'	Report	Gartler 90'	Stadium: Allianz Stadion; Attendance: 18,200; Referee: Christopher Jäger

== Final ==
=== Details ===
1 June 2017
20:30 CEST

SK Rapid Wien	1–2	Red Bull Salzburg
Joelinton 56'	Report	Hwang Hee-chan 51'; Samassekou 85'

Wörthersee Stadion, Klagenfurt
Attendance: 20,200
Referee: Markus Hameter

GK	21	(Austria) Tobias Knoflach
RB	22	(Austria) Mario Pavelic
CB	17	(Austria) Christopher Dibon	(yellow card) 90+5'
CB	39	(Austria) Maximilian Wöber
LB	4	(Austria) Thomas Schrammel
MF	8	(Austria) Stefan Schwab (c)
MF	24	(Austria) Stephan Auer
MF	18	(Hungary) Tamás Szántó	(substituted off) 73'
MF	10	(Austria) Louis Schaub	(substituted off) 71'
MF	29	(Austria) Thomas Murg	(yellow card) 74'	(substituted off) 86'
FW	34	(Brazil) Joelinton	56'
Substitutes:
GK	30	(Austria) Richard Strebinger
CB	3	(Austria) Christoph Schösswendter	(substituted on) 86'
RB	38	(Austria) Manuel Thurnwald
MF	11	(Austria) Steffen Hofmann
MF	27	(Austria) Andreas Kuen	(substituted on) 71'
FW	9	(Croatia) Matej Jelić
MF	23	(Iceland) Arnór Ingvi Traustason	(substituted on) 73'
Manager:
(Austria) Goran Djuricin

GK	1	(Austria) Cican Stanković
RB	22	(Austria) Stefan Lainer	(yellow card) 17'
CB	47	(England) Andre Wisdom
CB	3	(Brazil) Paulo Miranda
LB	17	(Austria) Andreas Ulmer (c)	(substituted off) 70'
RM	10	(Austria) Valentino Lazaro	85'	(substituted off) 90+1'
CM	27	(Austria) Konrad Laimer
CM	8	(Mali) Diadie Samassékou
LM	14	(Kosovo) Valon Berisha
FW	9	(South Korea) Hwang Hee-chan	51'
FW	94	(Brazil) Wanderson	(substituted off) 84'
Substitutes:
GK	33	(Austria) Alexander Walke
CB	5	(Croatia) Duje Caleta-Car	(substituted on) 90+1'
RB	6	(Switzerland) Christian Schwegler	(substituted on) 70'
CM	4	(Mali) Amadou Haidara	(substituted on) 84'
CM	24	(Austria) Christoph Leitgeb
LM	18	(Japan) Takumi Minamino
FW	77	(Switzerland) Dimitri Oberlin
Manager:
(Spain) Óscar García

Match rules

- 90 minutes.
- 30 minutes of extra time if necessary.
- Penalty shoot-out if scores still level.
- Seven named substitutes, of which up to four may be used.
