= 2017–18 Austrian Football First League =

Austrian Football First League
- Season: 2017–18
- Champions: FC Wacker Innsbruck
- Promoted: FC Wacker Innsbruck; TSV Hartberg
- Matches: 180
- Goals: 507 (2.82 per match)
- Top goalscorer: Seifedin Chabbi; Hamdi Salihi; (22 goals each)
- Biggest home win: SV Ried 7–1 Kapfenberger SV (25 May 2018)
- Biggest away win: Kapfenberger SV 0–5 FC Liefering (14 November 2017)
- Highest scoring: SC Wiener Neustadt 6–3 FC Blau-Weiß Linz (1 December 2017)

The 2017–18 Austrian Football First League (German: Erste Liga, also known as Sky Go Erste Liga due to sponsorship) was the 44th season of the Austrian second-level football league and the last one as the First League. It began on 21 July 2017 and ended on 25 May 2018. The fixtures were announced on 21 June 2017.

== Teams ==
Ten teams participated in the 2017–18 season. TSV Hartberg was promoted after winning the 2016–17 Regionalliga Mitte without having to compete in promotion play-offs as no team from the Regionalliga West or Ost applied for promotion. They replaced SV Horn who finished last in the 2016–17 First League. SV Ried were relegated from the 2016–17 Bundesliga, replacing 2016–17 First League champions LASK Linz.

Location of teams in the 2017–18 Austrian Football First League

Club Name	City	Stadium	Capacity
Austria Lustenau	Lustenau	Reichshofstadion	8,800
FC Blau-Weiß Linz	Linz	Donauparkstadion	2,000
Floridsdorfer AC	Vienna	FAC-Platz	3,000
TSV Hartberg	Hartberg	Profertil Arena Hartberg	4,500
Kapfenberger SV	Kapfenberg	Franz-Fekete-Stadion	12,000
Liefering	Salzburg	Untersberg-Arena	4,128
SV Ried	Ried im Innkreis	Keine Sorgen Arena	7,680
Wacker Innsbruck	Innsbruck	Tivoli-Neu	30,000
Wiener Neustadt	Wiener Neustadt	Stadion Wiener Neustadt	10,000
WSG Wattens	Wattens	Alpenstadion	5,500

=== Personnel and kits ===
Club	Manager	Captain	Kit Manufacturer	Sponsors
Austria Lustenau	(Austria) Andreas Lipa (1–11)	(Austria) Christoph Kobleder (1–4, 6–19)	Uhlsport	Mohren
Austria Lustenau	(Germany) Daniel Ernemann (12–13)	(Austria) Martin Grasegger (5)	Uhlsport	Mohren
Austria Lustenau	(Austria) Gernot Plassnegger (from 14) & (Austria) Michael Kopf (19–20)	(Austria) Marco Krainz (20–22, 24–27, 29, 31–36)	Uhlsport	Mohren
Austria Lustenau	(Austria) Gernot Plassnegger (from 14) & (Austria) Michael Kopf (19–20)	(Brazil) Ronivaldo (23)	Uhlsport	Mohren
Austria Lustenau	(Austria) Gernot Plassnegger (from 14) & (Austria) Michael Kopf (19–20)	(Austria) Sandro Djurić (28, 30)	Uhlsport	Mohren
FC Blau-Weiß Linz	(Austria) Günther Gorenzel (1–15)	(Austria) Florian Maier (1–3, 6–12, 14, 16–17)	Uhlsport	Linz AG
FC Blau-Weiß Linz	(Austria) David Wimleitner (16–20)	(Austria) Lukas Gabriel (4–5, 13, 15, 18–20)	Uhlsport	Linz AG
FC Blau-Weiß Linz	(Austria) Thomas Sageder (from 21)	(Austria) Lukas Gabriel (4–5, 13, 15, 18–20)	Uhlsport	Linz AG
FC Blau-Weiß Linz	(Austria) Thomas Sageder (from 21)	(Austria) Thomas Hinum (21–29, 32–33)	Uhlsport	Linz AG
FC Blau-Weiß Linz	(Austria) Thomas Sageder (from 21)	(Austria) Daniel Kerschbaumer (30–31, 34–36)	Uhlsport	Linz AG
Floridsdorfer	(Austria) Thomas Eidler (1–23)	(Austria) Martin Fraisl (1–21, 23–24)	Puma	Wiener Städtische & Wien Energie
Floridsdorfer	(Austria) Martin Handl (from 24)	(Austria) Mario Kröpfl (22, 25–28, 36)	Puma	Wiener Städtische & Wien Energie
Floridsdorfer	(Austria) Martin Handl (from 24)	(Austria) Robert Völkl (29)	Puma	Wiener Städtische & Wien Energie
Floridsdorfer	(Austria) Martin Handl (from 24)	(Austria) Marco Sahanek (30–35)	Puma	Wiener Städtische & Wien Energie
TSV Hartberg	(Austria) Christian Ilzer	(Austria) Siegfried Rasswalder (1–4, 7–16, 18, 20–35)	Jako	Prolacta, Admiral, Egger Glass & Profertil
TSV Hartberg	(Austria) Christian Ilzer	(Austria) Manfred Gollner (5–6, 17)	Jako	Prolacta, Admiral, Egger Glass & Profertil
TSV Hartberg	(Austria) Christian Ilzer	(Croatia) Roko Mišlov (19, 36)	Jako	Prolacta, Admiral, Egger Glass & Profertil
Kapfenberger	(Austria) Robert Pflug (1–4)	(Austria) David Sencar (1–3, 6–17, 20–23, 25–27, 29–36)	Erima	Murauer Bier
Kapfenberger	(Austria) Stefan Rapp (5–34)	(Austria) Paul Gartler (4–5)	Erima	Murauer Bier
Kapfenberger	(Austria) Karl-Heinz Kubesch (from 35)	(Austria) Tobias Kainz (18–19, 24, 28)	Erima	Murauer Bier
Liefering	(Poland) Janusz Góra & (Austria) Gerhard Struber	(Austria) Luca Meisl (1–8, 12, 15–16, 18–24, 27, 30–32, 34–35)	Nike	Red Bull
Liefering	(Poland) Janusz Góra & (Austria) Gerhard Struber	(Austria) Emir Karic (9)	Nike	Red Bull
Liefering	(Poland) Janusz Góra & (Austria) Gerhard Struber	(Brazil) Carlos Miguel Coronel (10–11, 13–14, 17, 25–26, 28–29, 33)	Nike	Red Bull
Liefering	(Poland) Janusz Góra & (Austria) Gerhard Struber	(France) Mahamadou Dembélé (36)	Nike	Red Bull
SV Ried	(Tunisia) Lassaad Chabbi (1–25)	(Germany) (Austria) Thomas Gebauer	Hummel	Josko
SV Ried	(Austria) Franz Schiemer (26–28)	(Germany) (Austria) Thomas Gebauer	Hummel	Josko
SV Ried	(Austria) Thomas Weissenböck (from 29)	(Germany) (Austria) Thomas Gebauer	Hummel	Josko
Wacker Innsbruck	(Austria) Karl Daxbacher	(Austria) Christoph Freitag (1–2, 4, 6, 20–24, 30, 32–33, 36)	Macron	Tiroler Wasserkraft
Wacker Innsbruck	(Austria) Karl Daxbacher	(Austria) Florian Jamnig (3, 5, 7–19, 25–26, 35)	Macron	Tiroler Wasserkraft
Wacker Innsbruck	(Austria) Karl Daxbacher	(Austria) Roman Kerschbaum (27–29, 34)	Macron	Tiroler Wasserkraft
Wacker Innsbruck	(Austria) Karl Daxbacher	(Austria) Harald Pichler (31)	Macron	Tiroler Wasserkraft
WSG Wattens	(Austria) Thomas Silberberger	(Germany) Ferdinand Oswald (1–24, 27–31, 33–36)	Erima	PAPSTAR
WSG Wattens	(Austria) Thomas Silberberger	(Austria) Benjamin Pranter (25)	Erima	PAPSTAR
WSG Wattens	(Austria) Thomas Silberberger	(Austria) Sandro Neurauter (26)	Erima	PAPSTAR
WSG Wattens	(Austria) Thomas Silberberger	(Austria) Florian Buchacher (32)	Erima	PAPSTAR
Wiener Neustadt	(Austria) Roman Mählich	(Austria) Sargon Duran (1, 13–24, 26–27)	Puma	Baumit
Wiener Neustadt	(Austria) Roman Mählich	(Austria) Mario Ebenhofer (2–3, 5–6, 10, 25)	Puma	Baumit
Wiener Neustadt	(Austria) Roman Mählich	(Austria) Remo Mally (4, 7–9, 11–12)	Puma	Baumit
Wiener Neustadt	(Austria) Roman Mählich	(Albania) Hamdi Salihi (28–36)	Puma	Baumit

== League table ==
Pos	Team	Pld	W	D	L	GF	GA	GD	Pts	Promotion or qualification
1	FC Wacker Innsbruck (C, P)	36	21	8	7	60	31	+29	71	Promotion to 2018–19 Austrian Bundesliga
2	TSV Hartberg (P)	36	20	8	8	63	34	+29	68	Promotion to 2018–19 Austrian Bundesliga
3	SC Wiener Neustadt	36	17	11	8	53	37	+16	62	Qualification for the promotion play-off (Note: The team finishing in third place competed against the tenth placed team of the Bundesliga for a place in the 2018-19 Austrian Bundesliga.)
4	SV Ried	36	17	10	9	68	41	+27	61	
5	FC Liefering	36	14	13	9	58	44	+14	55	Ineligible for promotion
6	SC Austria Lustenau	36	12	9	15	48	52	−4	45	
7	WSG Wattens	36	10	10	16	45	56	−11	40	
8	Kapfenberger SV	36	9	8	19	40	68	−28	35	
9	Floridsdorfer AC	36	8	6	22	37	75	−38	30	
10	FC Blau-Weiß Linz	36	5	11	20	35	69	−34	26	Reprieved from relegation (Note: No team will be relegated due to the league's expansion from 10 teams to 16 for the 2018–19 season.)

Rules for classification: 1) Points; 2) Less matches awarded against; 3) Goal difference; 4) Goals scored; 5) Matches won; 6) Away matches won; 7) Head-to-head points; 8) Head-to-head goal difference; 9) Head-to-head goals scored.
(C) Champions; (P) Promoted

== Results ==
Teams played each other four times in the league. In the first half of the season each team played every other team twice (home and away), and then did the same in the second half of the season.

=== First half of season ===
Home \ Away	ALU	BWL	FLO	HAR	KAP	RIE	LIE	WKR	WIE	WAT
Austria Lustenau		1–1	5–0	1–2	1–2	0–2	2–4	0–4	2–3	2–0
FC Blau-Weiß Linz	1–2		4–0	1–1	0–2	1–1	2–3	1–1	1–1	0–2
Floridsdorfer AC	1–5	0–0		2–0	0–3	1–4	2–2	1–1	0–3	1–0
TSV Hartberg	0–0	2–0	3–1		4–0	2–2	2–2	3–1	0–1	2–1
Kapfenberger SV	0–1	0–1	4–1	0–2		2–1	1–2	2–1	0–0	1–1
SV Ried	3–1	2–1	3–2	2–3	2–0		6–1	4–1	0–1	4–0
Liefering	0–0	3–0	3–1	3–1	2–1	4–0		1–0	0–0	0–1
Wacker Innsbruck	3–2	3–0	3–0	0–0	0–0	1–1	1–0		3–0	1–0
Wiener Neustadt	1–1	4–0	1–2	1–0	4–2	0–3	2–0	0–1		2–1
WSG Wattens	1–2	2–2	5–1	0–1	3–1	1–2	3–2	1–3	0–1	

Updated to match(es) played on 17 November 2017. Source: Austrian Football First League (in German)
Legend: Blue = home team win; Yellow = draw; Red = away team win.

=== Second half of season ===
Home \ Away	ALU	BWL	FLO	HAR	KAP	RIE	LIE	WKR	WIE	WAT
Austria Lustenau		1–0	2–1	0–4	3–1	0–0	0–0	1–2	2–1	2–2
FC Blau-Weiß Linz	0–2		1–0	1–3	0–2	2–2	2–1	1–2	0–3	2–2
Floridsdorfer AC	2–1	5–0		0–1	0–1	2–4	3–2	0–2	0–3	0–0
TSV Hartberg	2–0	2–2	1–2		4–0	1–0	0–2	0–2	2–1	4–0
Kapfenberger SV	0–2	1–4	3–3	1–3		0–0	0–5	2–1	0–0	2–3
SV Ried	2–0	1–0	1–1	0–1	7–1		1–0	1–3	2–2	2–0
Liefering	1–1	1–1	1–0	3–2	1–1	1–1		2–2	1–1	2–2
Wacker Innsbruck	2–1	4–0	0–2	0–0	1–1	3–1	2–1		2–0	2–0
Wiener Neustadt	2–2	6–3	1–0	1–1	2–1	1–0	0–2	1–0		2–2
WSG Wattens	2–0	1–0	2–0	1–4	3–2	1–1	0–0	1–2	1–1	

Updated to match(es) played on 25 May 2018. Source: Austrian Football First League (in German)
Legend: Blue = home team win; Yellow = draw; Red = away team win.

== Season statistics ==
=== Top goalscorers ===
Up to 25 May 2018.

Rank	Scorer	Club	Goals
1	(Tunisia) Seifedin Chabbi	SV Ried	22
1	(Albania) Hamdi Salihi	SC Wiener Neustadt	22
3	(Slovenia) Zlatko Dedić	FC Wacker Innsbruck	19
4	(Austria) Dario Tadić	TSV Hartberg	16
5	(Brazil) Ronivaldo	SC Austria Lustenau	12
5	(Slovakia) Milan Jurdík	WSG Wattens	12
7	(Austria) Florian Jamnig	FC Wacker Innsbruck	11
7	(Croatia) Roko Mišlov	TSV Hartberg	11
9	(Austria) Thomas Fröschl	SV Ried	10
9	(Hungary) Dominik Szoboszlai	FC Liefering	10

=== Top assists ===
Up to 25 May 2018.

Rank	Player	Club	Assists
1	(Austria) Dario Tadić	TSV Hartberg	14
2	(Austria) Christopher Drazan	SC Austria Lustenau	11
3	(Germany) Daniele Gabriele	FC Wacker Innsbruck	10
4	(Turkey) İlkay Durmuş	SV Ried	9
5	(Austria) Mario Ebenhofer	SC Wiener Neustadt	8
6	(Slovenia) Zlatko Dedić	FC Wacker Innsbruck	7
6	(Austria) Manfred Fischer	TSV Hartberg	7
6	(Burkina Faso) Zakaria Sanogo	TSV Hartberg	7
9	(Austria) Thomas Mayer	SV Ried	6
9	(Austria) Christoph Kröpfl	TSV Hartberg	6
9	(Germany) Julian Wießmeier	SV Ried	6
9	(Austria) Manuel Kerhe	SV Ried	6

=== Discipline ===
Up to 25 May 2018.

Rank	Player	Club	Yellow card	Yellow card Red card	Red card	Total
1	(Austria) Peter Haring	SV Ried	15	0	0	15
2	(Austria) Manuel Haas	Kapfenberger SV	10	3	0	13
3	(Austria) Fabian Miesenböck	SC Wiener Neustadt	13	0	0	13
4	(Austria) Florian Buchacher	WSG Wattens	12	0	0	12
5	(Brazil) Lucas Rangel	Kapfenberger SV	9	2	0	11
6	(Austria) Daniel Kerschbaumer	FC Blau-Weiß Linz	9	1	0	10
7	(Germany) Daniel Raischl	Floridsdorfer AC	10	0	0	10
8	(Austria) David Gugganig	WSG Wattens	9	0	0	9
8	(Spain) Pesca	Kapfenberger SV	9	0	0	9
8	(Austria) Daniel Geissler	Kapfenberger SV	9	0	0	9
8	(Austria) Christopher Cvetko	FC Blau-Weiß Linz	9	0	0	9

== See also ==
- 2017–18 Austrian Football Bundesliga
- 2017–18 Austrian Cup
