= Aleksandar Đorđević (disambiguation) =

Aleksandar Đorđević (born 1967) is a Serbian basketball player and coach.

Aleksandar Đorđević may also refer to:

- Aleksandar Đorđević (footballer, born 1968), Serbian defender and coach
- Aleksandar Đorđević (footballer, born 1981), Austrian defender
- Aleksandar Đorđević (footballer, born 1999), Serbian defensive midfielder

== See also ==
- Saša Đorđević (footballer) (1981–2025), Serbian right-back
