= Hamzić =

Hamzić or Hamzic is a Bosnian surname. Notable people with the surname include:

- Amir Hamzić (born 1975), Bosnian footballer
- Armin Hamzic (born 1993), Austrian footballer
- Dino Hamzić (born 1988), Bosnian footballer
- Dževad Hamzić (born 1968), Bosnian volleyball player
- Mihajlo Hamzić (1482–1518), painter from Dubrovnik
- Salko Hamzić (born 2006), Austrian footballer
