= Philipp Plank =

Austrian footballer

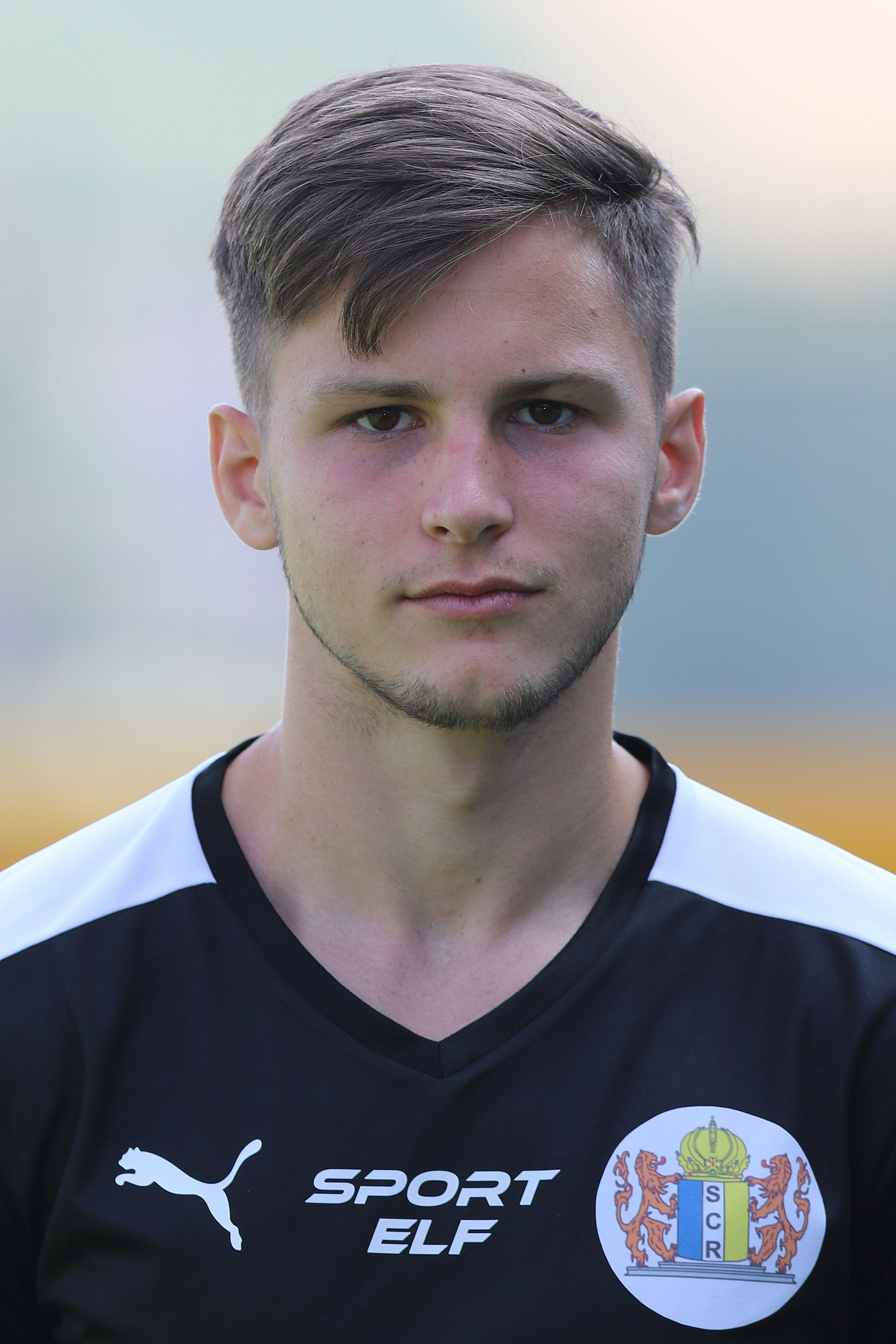

Personal information
- Date of birth: 11 June 1995 (age 31)
- Place of birth: Purgstall an der Erlauf, Austria
- Height: 1.76 m (5 ft 9 1/2 in)
- Position: Midfielder

Team information
- Current team: Kapfenberger SV
- Number: 21

Youth career
- –2013: AKA St. Pölten

Senior career*
Years	Team	Apps	(Gls)
2013–2016	Rapid Wien II	65	(15)
2016–2017	SC Ritzing	19	(6)
2017–	Kapfenberger SV	6	(0)

International career
2013	Austria U18	1	(0)
2013	Austria U19	1	(0)
- * Club domestic league appearances and goals as of 16:18, 12 April 2018 (UTC)

Philipp Plank (born 11 June 1995) is an Austrian footballer currently playing as a midfielder for Kapfenberger SV of the Erste Liga.

== Career statistics ==
=== Club ===
As of 12 April 2018.

Appearances and goals by club, season and competition
Club	Season	League			Cup		Continental		Other		Total	
Club	Season	Division	Apps	Goals	Apps	Goals	Apps	Goals	Apps	Goals	Apps	Goals
Rapid Wien II	2013–14	Regionalliga	20	5	0	0	–		0	0	20	5
Rapid Wien II	2014–15	Regionalliga	25	7	0	0	–		0	0	25	7
Rapid Wien II	2015–16	Regionalliga	20	3	0	0	–		0	0	20	3
Rapid Wien II	Total		65	15	0	0	–		0	0	65	15
SC Ritzing	2016–17	Regionalliga	19	6	2 (Note: Appearances in the Austrian Cup)	1	–		0	0	21	7
Kapfenberger SV	2017–18	Erste Liga	6	0	0	0	–		0	0	6	0
Career total			90	21	2	1	–		0	0	92	22

Notes

|2019 ISL
