= Nenad Panić =

Serbian footballer

Personal information
- Full name: Nenad Panić
- Date of birth: 12 January 1984 (age 42)
- Place of birth: Kladovo, SFR Yugoslavia
- Height: 1.84 m (6 ft 0 in)
- Position: Centre forward

Senior career*
Years	Team	Apps	(Gls)
2001–2002	Železničar Beograd		
2002–2003	Red Star Belgrade	0	(0)
2003–2007	Čukarički		
2008–2009	Würmla	16	(6)
2009–2010	Javor Ivanjica	38	(1)
2011	Hajduk Kula	3	(0)
2012–2013	Retz	28	(10)
2013–2014	Floridsdorfer AC	27	(13)
2014	Parndorf	15	(0)
2015–2020	Mannsdorf	148	(71)
2020	SV Stockerau	6	(3)
- * Club domestic league appearances and goals as of 00:48, 17 January 2021 (UTC)

Nenad Panić (Serbian Cyrillic: Ненад Панић; born 12 January 1984) is a Serbian retired football forward.
