= Julian Tomka =

Austrian footballer (born 1997)

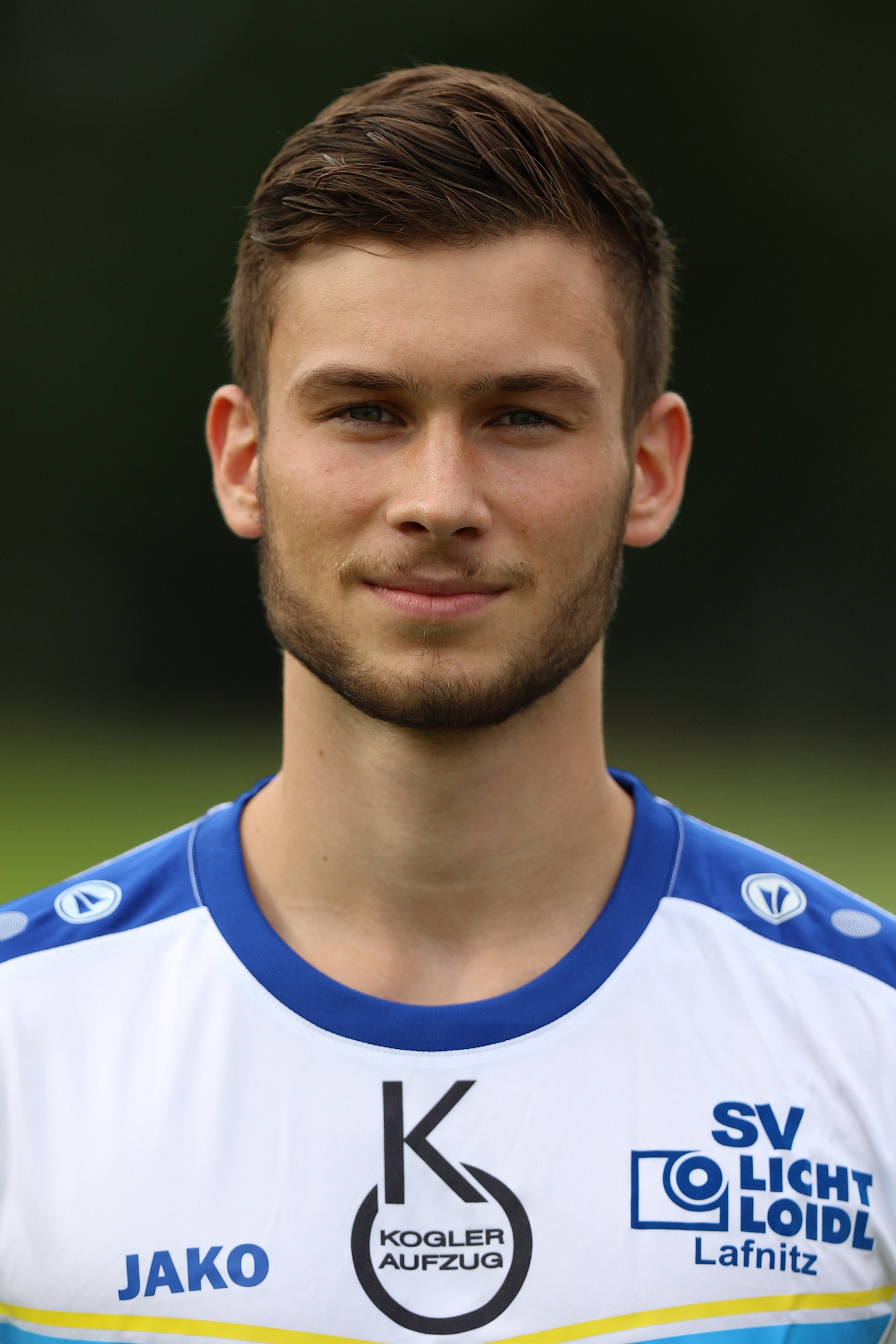
- Tomka with Lafnitz in 2017

Personal information
- Date of birth: 5 May 1997 (age 29)
- Place of birth: Klagenfurt, Austria
- Height: 1.90 m (6 ft 3 in)
- Position: Centre-back

Team information
- Current team: SC Weiz
- Number: 4

Youth career
- ASV Gösting
- LUV Graz
- Grazer AK
- DSV Leoben

Senior career*
| Years | Team | Apps | (Gls) |
| 2014–2015 | Anger | 28 | (2) |
| 2015–2016 | Hartberg | 20 | (0) |
| 2016–2021 | Lafnitz | 125 | (14) |
| 2021–2022 | St. Pölten | 12 | (0) |
| 2022–2023 | Horn | 17 | (1) |
| 2023–2024 | Amstetten | 24 | (1) |
| 2024 | → Lahti (loan) | 0 | (0) |
| 2025– | SC Weiz | 36 | (3) |
- * Club domestic league appearances and goals as of 27 June 2026

Julian Tomka (born 5 May 1997) is an Austrian professional football defender for SC Weiz.
