= Mario Stefel =

Austrian footballer

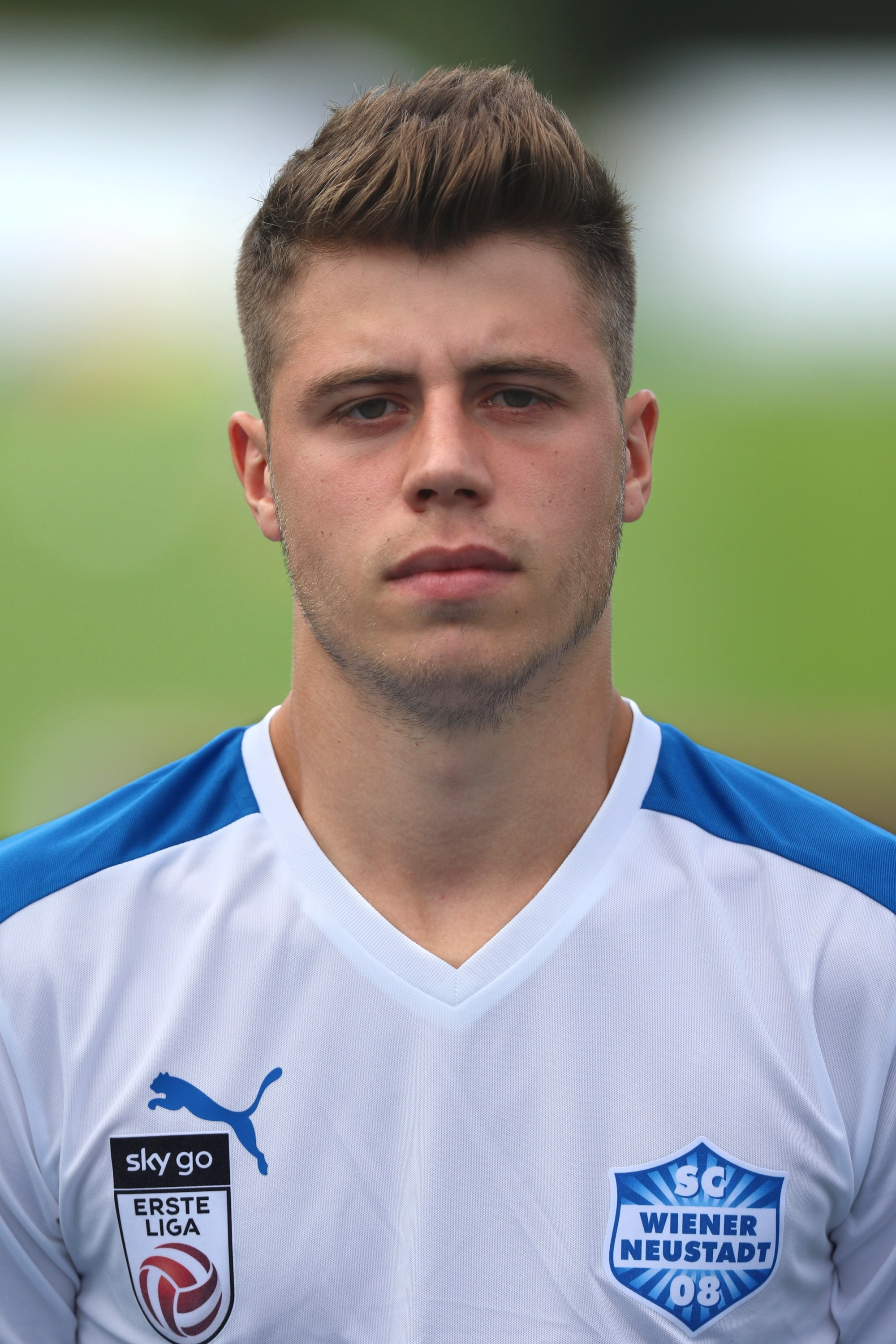

Personal information
- Date of birth: 8 February 1996 (age 30)
- Place of birth: Austria
- Height: 1.84 m (6 ft 1/2 in)
- Position: Left midfielder

Team information
- Current team: USV Eschen/Mauren
- Number: 27

Youth career
- –2012: Rapid Wien
- 2012–2013: Team Wiener Linien

Senior career*
| Years | Team | Apps | (Gls) |
| 2013–2017 | Wiener Neustadt II | 39 | (13) |
| 2015–2019 | Wiener Neustadt | 104 | (8) |
| 2019–2020 | SV Horn | 25 | (2) |
| 2020–2022 | SC Rheindorf Altach | 19 | (2) |
| 2022 | Dornbirn | 12 | (2) |
| 2022– | USV Eschen/Mauren | 11 | (4) |
- * Club domestic league appearances and goals as of 12 November 2022

Mario Stefel (born 8 February 1996) is an Austrian footballer who plays for Liechtensteiner club USV Eschen/Mauren.

== Career ==
=== SV Horn ===
On 9 July 2019 SV Horn confirmed, that they had signed Stefel from SC Wiener Neustadt.

=== SCR Altach ===
On 10 July 2020 he signed with SC Rheindorf Altach.

=== Dornbirn ===
On 31 January 2022, Stefel joined Dornbirn until the end of the season.
