= Florian Buchacher =

Austrian footballer

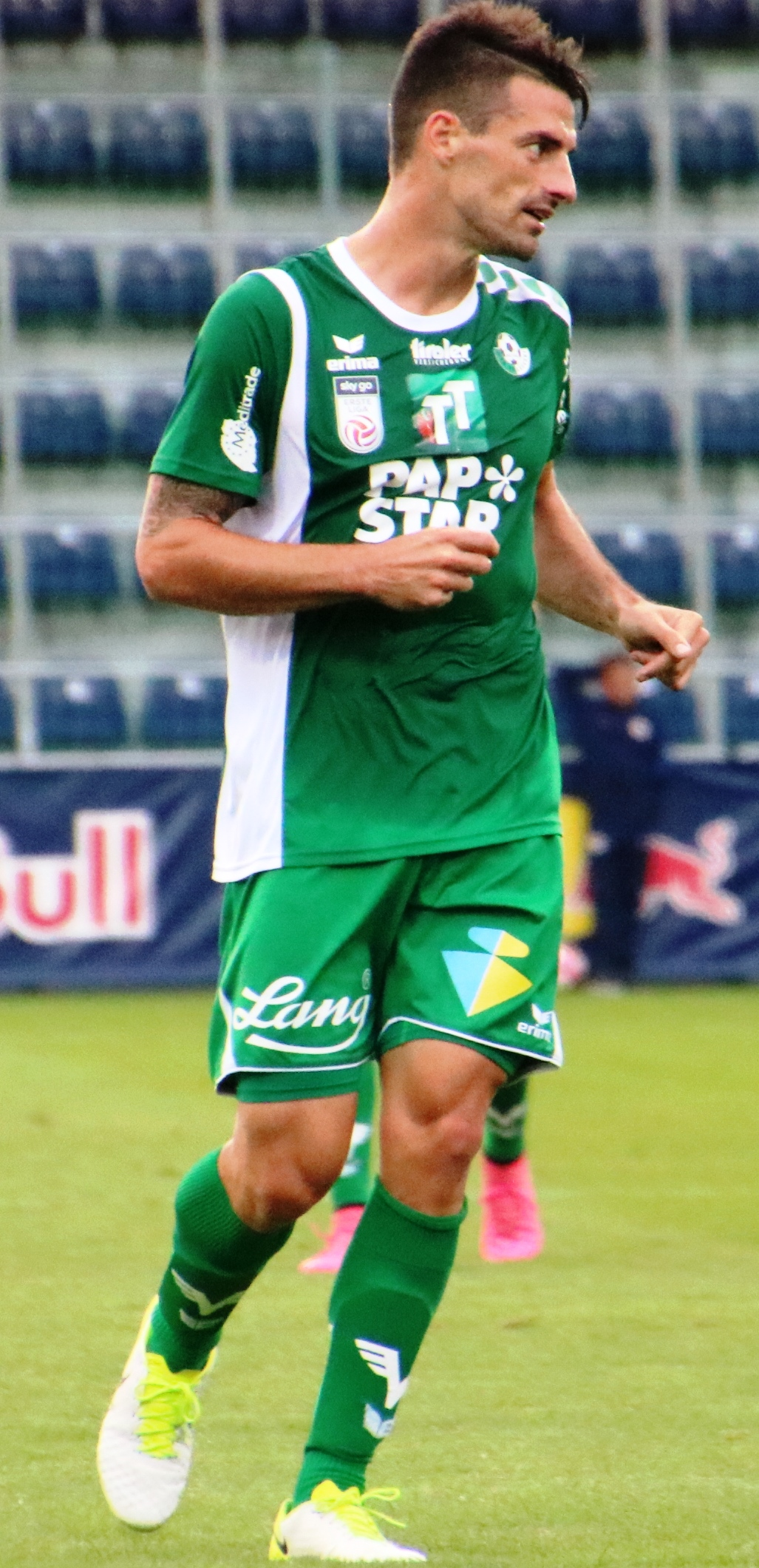
- Buchacher with WSG Wattens in 2017

Personal information
- Date of birth: 28 September 1987 (age 39)
- Place of birth: Innsbruck, Austria
- Height: 1.84 m (6 ft 0 in)
- Position: Left back

Youth career
- 1993–2004: Innsbrucker AC

Senior career*
Years	Team	Apps	(Gls)
2004–2008	Innsbrucker AC		
2008–2011	SVG Reichenau		
2011–2018	WSG Wattens	152	(15)
2018–2019	Wacker Innsbruck	5	(0)
2019–2021	WSG Wattens	30	(1)
- * Club domestic league appearances and goals as of 22 May 2021

Florian Buchacher (born 28 September 1987) is an Austrian football player.

== Club career ==
He made his Austrian Football First League debut for WSG Wattens on 22 July 2016 in a game against FC Blau-Weiß Linz.
