= Alhassane Keita (footballer, born 1992) =

Guinean footballer (born 1992)

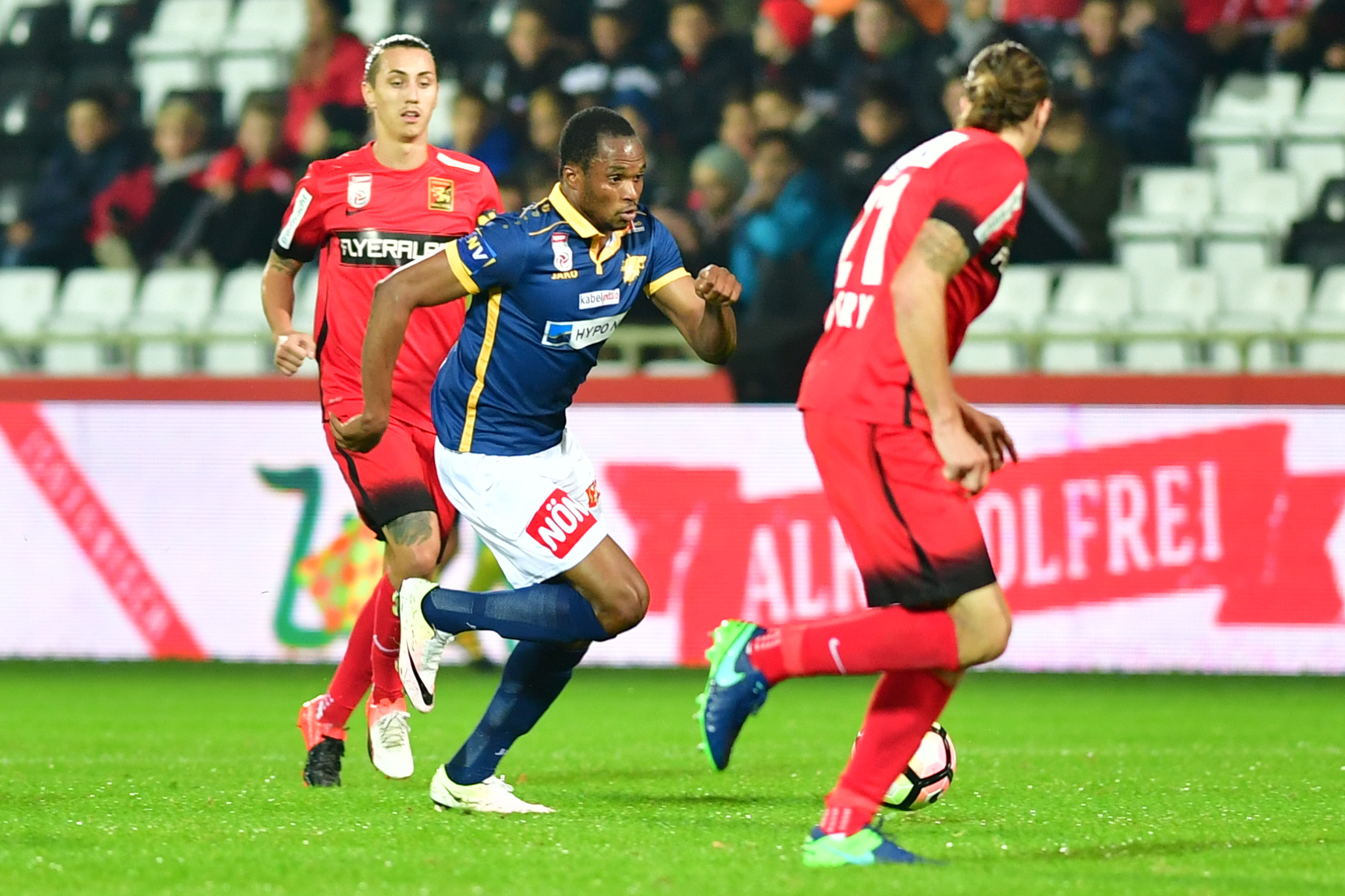

Personal information
- Date of birth: 16 April 1992 (age 34)
- Place of birth: Conakry, Guinea
- Height: 1.83 m (6 ft 0 in)
- Position: Forward

Team information
- Current team: Hapoel Nof HaGalil

Youth career
- Club Industriel de Kamsar
- 2010–2011: Metz

Senior career*
Years	Team	Apps	(Gls)
2011–2015	Metz	32	(7)
2013–2014	→ Boulogne (loan)	26	(4)
2014–2015	→ Lierse (loan)	24	(5)
2015–2016	Ermis	36	(13)
2016–2017	SKN St. Pölten	11	(2)
2017–2018	Marítimo	11	(3)
2017–2018	→ Maccabi Netanya (loan)	22	(5)
2018–2020	Belenenses SAD	25	(3)
2019–2020	→ Al Riffa (loan)	0	(0)
2022–2023	Mondorf-les-Bains	15	(8)
2023–	Hapoel Nof HaGaill	23	(8)

International career^{‡}
2017–	Guinea	2	(0)
- * Club domestic league appearances and goals as of 26 June 2023 ‡ National team caps and goals as of 31 March 2017

Alhassane Keita (born 16 April 1992) is a Guinean professional footballer who plays as a striker for the Liga Leumit club Hapoel Nof HaGalil.

== Club career ==
He made his first professional appearance for Club Industriel de Kamsar, and played as a striker for FC Metz in the French Ligue 2.

== International career ==
He played in the Coupe d'Afrique U17 in 2009 in Algeria. He made his debut for the senior Guinea national football team in a friendly 1–2 win over Cameroon on 28 March 2017.
