= Thomas Sageder =

Austrian association football manager

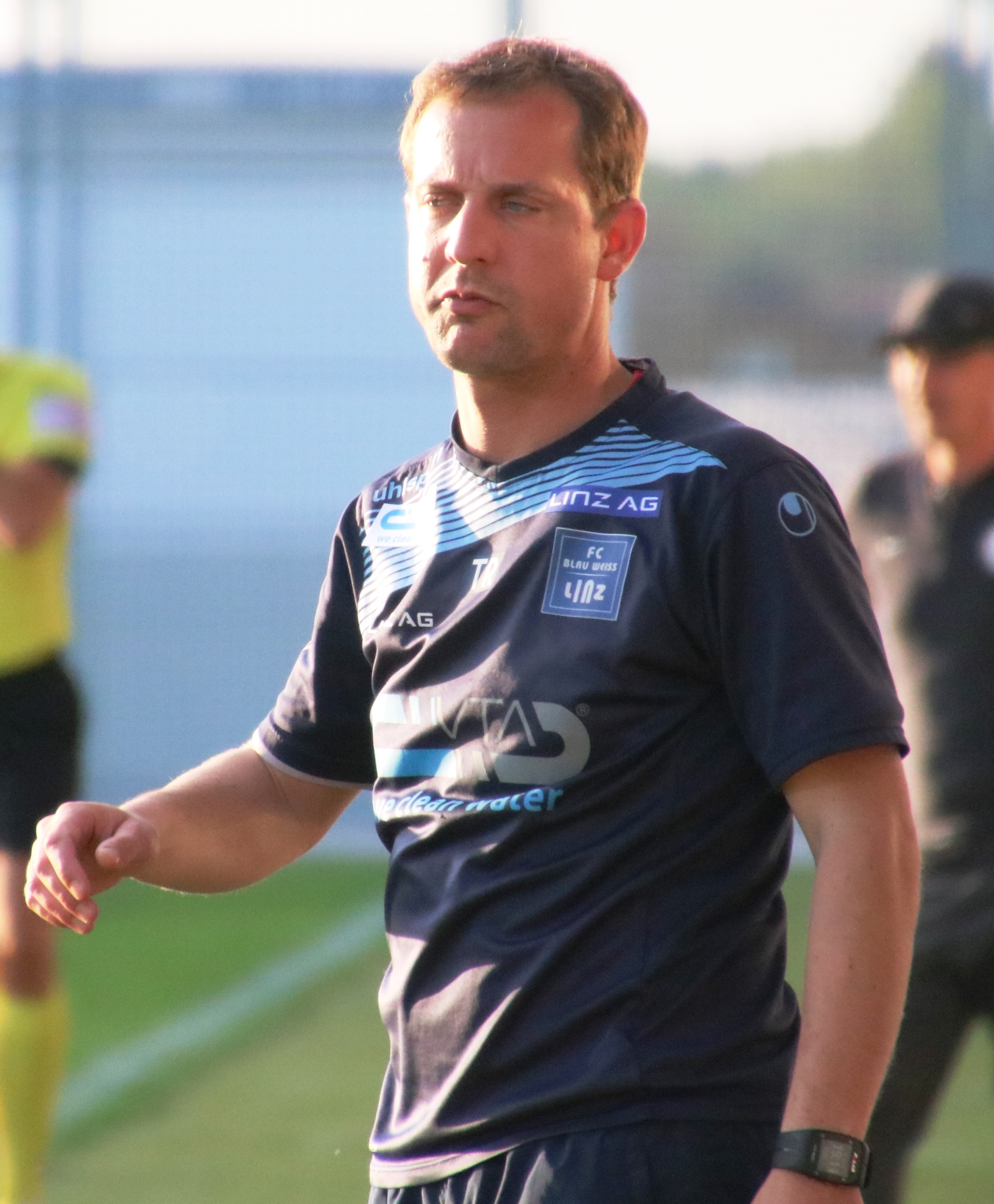
- Thomas Sageder in 2018

Personal information
- Date of birth: 5 September 1983 (age 43)
- Place of birth: Zell an der Pram, Austria
- Height: 1.81 m (5 ft 11 in)

Managerial career
- Years: Team
- 2007: SV Riedau (youth)
- 2008–2009: Red Bull Salzburg (youth)
- 2010–2011: Red Bull Ghana
- 2015: SV Ried (caretaker)
- 2015: SV Ried
- 2016–2017: SV Wallern
- 2017–2019: Blau-Weiß Linz
- 2019–2021: VfL Wolfsburg (assistant)
- 2021–2022: Red Bull Salzburg (academy)
- 2022–2023: Liefering (assistant)
- 2023–2024: LASK
- 2024–: Austria U17 (assistant)

Thomas Sageder (born 5 September 1983) is an Austrian football manager who most recently managed LASK.

== Career ==
In 2023, Sageder was appointed manager of Austrian side LASK.
