= Dominik Popp =

Austrian footballer

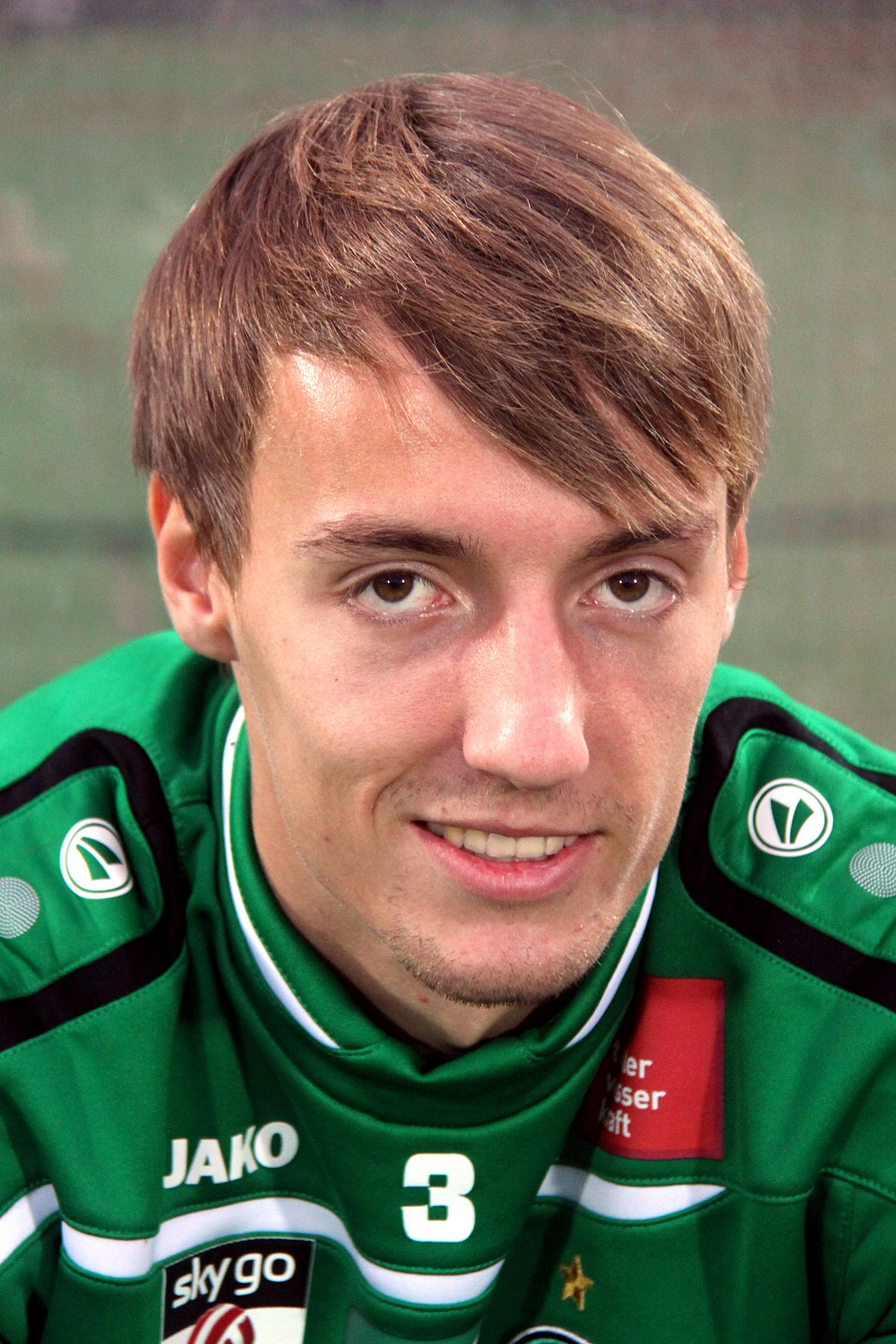
- Portrait of Dominik Popp

Personal information
- Date of birth: 20 April 1995 (age 31)
- Place of birth: Austria
- Height: 1.80 m (5 ft 11 in)
- Position: Defender

Youth career
- 2003–2007: SV Absam
- 2007–2008: FC Wacker Innsbruck
- 2008–2009: SV Absam
- 2009–2012: AKA Tirol

Senior career*
Years	Team	Apps	(Gls)
2012–2016	FC Wacker Innsbruck II	86	(1)
2014–2016	FC Wacker Innsbruck	11	(0)
2016–2017	WSG Wattens	10	(0)

International career
2010	Austria U16	1	(0)
- * Club domestic league appearances and goals as of 12 September 2017

Dominik Popp (born 20 April 1995) is an Austrian footballer who last played for WSG Wattens.
