= Kevin Nitzlnader =

Austrian footballer

Personal information
- Date of birth: 3 February 1993 (age 33)
- Place of birth: Austria
- Height: 1.78 m (5 ft 10 in)
- Position: Midfielder

Team information
- Current team: SC Schwaz
- Number: 27

Youth career
- 1998–1999: WSG Wattens
- 1999–2001: FC Volders
- 2001–2005: WSG Wattens
- 2005–2006: Wacker Innsbruck
- 2006–2007: SC Schwaz
- 2007–2011: AKA Tirol

Senior career*
Years	Team	Apps	(Gls)
2011–2016	Wacker Innsbruck II	100	(7)
2014–2016	Wacker Innsbruck	16	(0)
2016–2020	WSG Swarovski Tirol	64	(0)
2020–2023	WSG Swarovski Tirol II	42	(2)
2023–	SC Schwaz	60	(3)
- * Club domestic league appearances and goals as of 27 June 2026

Kevin Nitzlnader (born 3 February 1993) is an Austrian footballer who plays for SC Schwaz.
