= Sebastian Bauer =

Austrian footballer (born 1992)

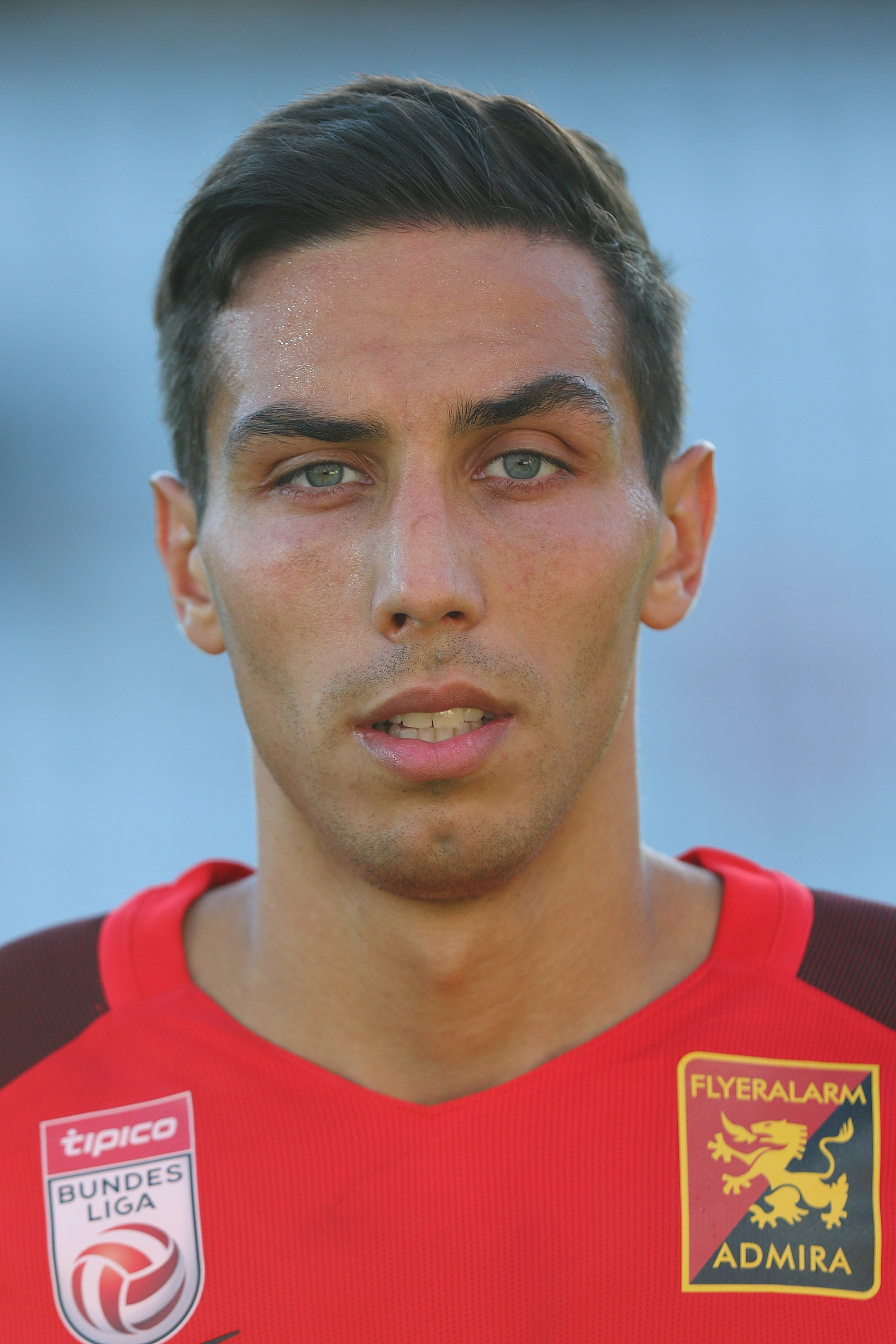
- Bauer with Admira Wacker in 2018

Personal information
- Date of birth: 7 November 1992 (age 34)
- Place of birth: Vienna, Austria
- Height: 1.83 m (6 ft 0 in)
- Position: Centre-back

Team information
- Current team: SKN St. Pölten
- Number: 4

Youth career
- 1999–2004: Donau Wien
- 2004–2007: Rapid Wien
- 2007: Donau Wien
- 2007: Rapid Wien
- 2007–2009: Team Wiener Linien

Senior career*
Years	Team	Apps	(Gls)
2009–2011	FC Stadlau	44	(3)
2011–2013	SV Mattersburg II	17	(0)
2013–2014	Leopoldsdorf/Marchfelde	12	(4)
2014–2018	ASK Ebreichsdorf	122	(17)
2018–2022	Admira Wacker	86	(1)
2022–2023	SV Horn	13	(0)
2023–	SKN St. Pölten	47	(0)
- * Club domestic league appearances and goals as of 12 June 2025

Sebastian Bauer (born 7 November 1992) is an Austrian professional footballer who plays as a centre-back for 2. Liga club SKN St. Pölten.

== Career ==
=== Early years ===
Bauer began his career with SV Donau Wien. In 2004, he joined the youth team of Rapid Wien. In 2007 he played briefly for Donau and then again shortly for Rapid before moving to Team Wiener Linien.

In the winter break of the 2008–09 season he joined FC Stadlau. He made his debut for Stadlau in the Wiener Stadtliga in May 2009, when he came on as a substitute for Gerald Lintner in the 72nd minute on the 24th matchday of that season against Rennweger SV 1901.

In January 2011 he moved to the third-tier reserve team of SV Mattersburg. In April 2011 he made his debut in the Austrian Regionalliga when he was brought into the game for Marvin Potzmann in the 67th minute on the 21st matchday of the 2010–11 season against SV Schwechat.

After two and a half years at Mattersburg II, Bauer moved to fifth-tier SC Leopoldsdorf/Mfd. for the 2013–14 season. In the winter break of that season he joined the league rivals ASK Ebreichsdorf. With Ebreichsdorf he was promoted to the Austrian Landesliga at the end of the season. In the 2014–15 season, they were also promoted to the Regionalliga as champions. That season, he played in all 30 games, scoring four goals.

=== Admira Wacker ===
After 81 games for Ebreichsdorf in the Regionalliga, he moved to Bundesliga side Admira Wacker for the 2018–19 season, where he received a contract that ran until June 2020. He made his debut for Admira on 20 July 2018, when he was in the starting eleven in the Austrian Cup match against SC Neusiedl am See 1919. On 26 July 2018, he made his first appearance in an international match when he played from start in the second-round first leg of the UEFA Europa League qualifier against CSKA Sofia. On 5 August 2018, he made his debut in the Bundesliga when he was in the starting line-up on the second matchday of that season against TSV Hartberg.

=== SV Horn ===
Following Admira Wacker's relegation to the 2. Liga after the 2021–22 season, Bauer joined SV Horn on 2 July 2022. On 15 July 2022, he made his competitive debut for the club in the first round of the Austrian Cup, starting in a 3–0 away victory over ASV Draßburg. His league debut for Horn followed one week later, on 22 July, in a 2–1 win against Sturm Graz II.

=== SKN St. Pölten ===
On 5 February 2023, Bauer joined 2. Liga league leaders SKN St. Pölten on a short-term contract, following half a season of impressive displays at SV Horn. He made his debut for St. Pölten on 26 February 2023, starting in a 2–0 league victory against Sturm Graz II.
