= Mario Ebenhofer =

Austrian footballer

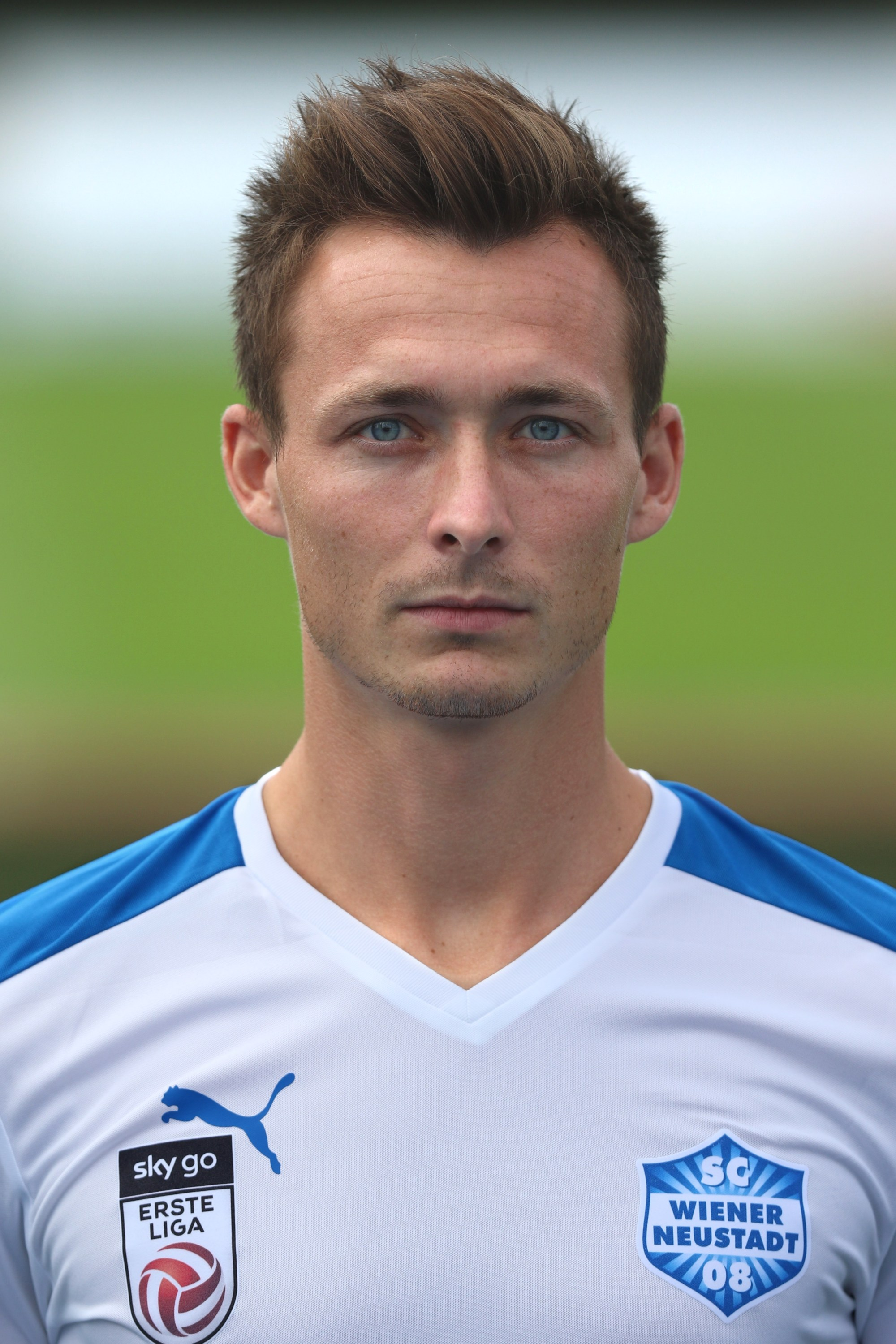

Personal information
- Date of birth: 29 July 1992 (age 34)
- Place of birth: Austria
- Height: 1.80 m (5 ft 11 in)
- Position: Left midfielder

Team information
- Current team: SGV Freiberg
- Number: 22

Senior career*
Years	Team	Apps	(Gls)
2008–2010	Union Perg		
2010–2014	Amstetten	99	(17)
2014–2015	Wiener Neustadt	10	(1)
2015	→ St. Pölten (loan)	4	(0)
2016–2018	Wiener Neustadt	65	(7)
2018–2019	Blau-Weiß Linz	25	(10)
2019–2020	Botoșani	13	(0)
2020–	SGV Freiberg	6	(1)
- * Club domestic league appearances and goals as of 4 January 2021

Mario Ebenhofer (born 29 July 1992) is an Austrian footballer who plays as a midfielder for SGV Freiberg.
