= Markus Keusch =

Austrian footballer

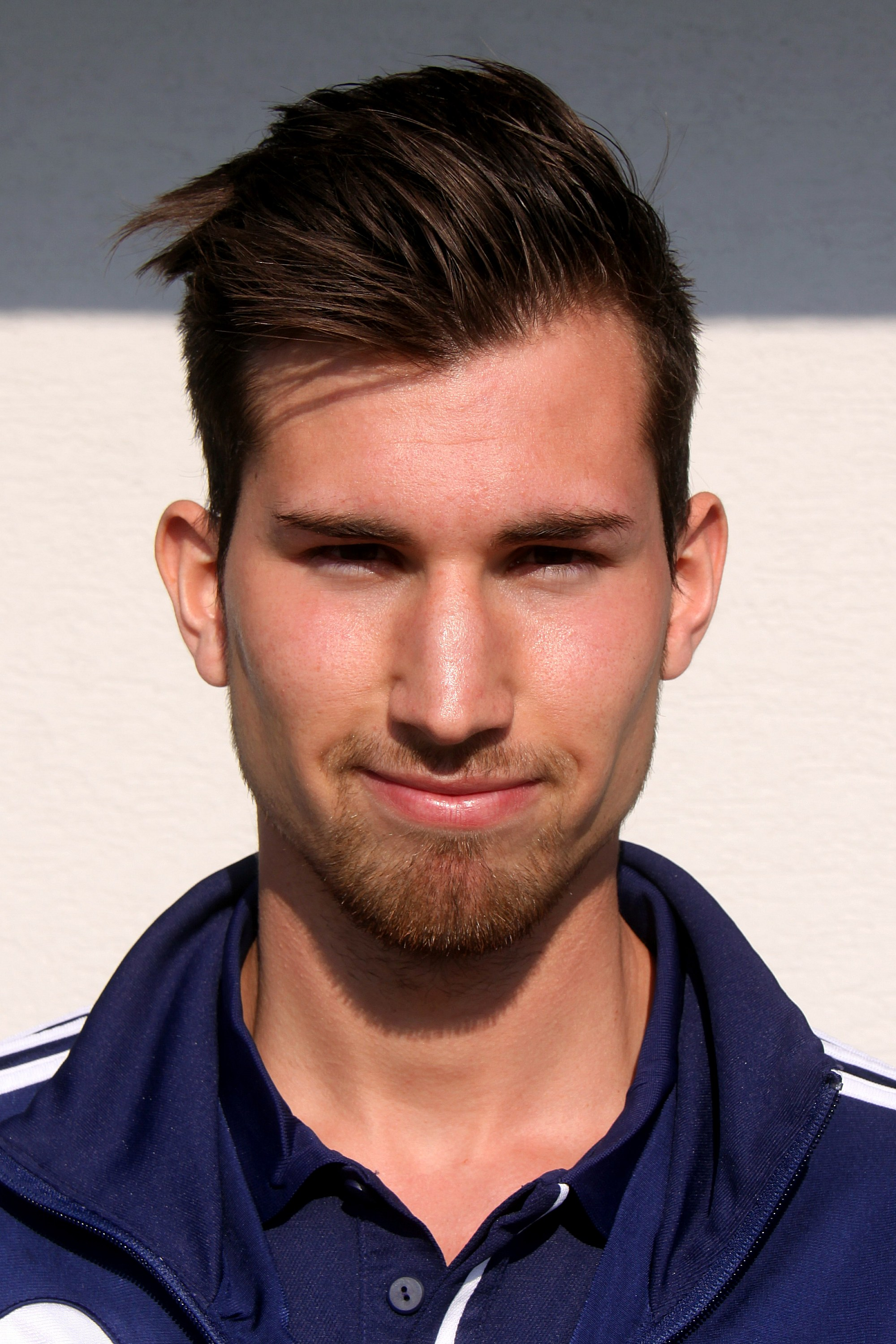
- Keusch in 2014

Personal information
- Date of birth: 24 May 1993 (age 33)
- Place of birth: Austria
- Height: 1.82 m (6 ft 0 in)
- Position: Midfielder

Team information
- Current team: SKU Amstetten
- Number: 1

Youth career
- 2002–2007: SKU Amstetten
- 2007–2010: AKA St. Polten

Senior career*
Years	Team	Apps	(Gls)
2010–2014	SKN St. Pölten	20	(0)
2011–2014	SKN St. Pölten II	37	(1)
2014–2020	SKU Amstetten	112	(2)

International career^{‡}
2009–2010	Austria U17	5	(0)
2010	Austria U18	2	(0)
- * Club domestic league appearances and goals as of 14:12, 19 November 2019 (UTC) ‡ National team caps and goals as of 15:02, 19 November 2019 (UTC)

Markus Keusch (born 24 May 1993) is an Austrian professional footballer who plays as a midfielder. He last played for Austrian Football Second League club SKU Amstetten.
