= Mladen Jutrić =

Austrian footballer

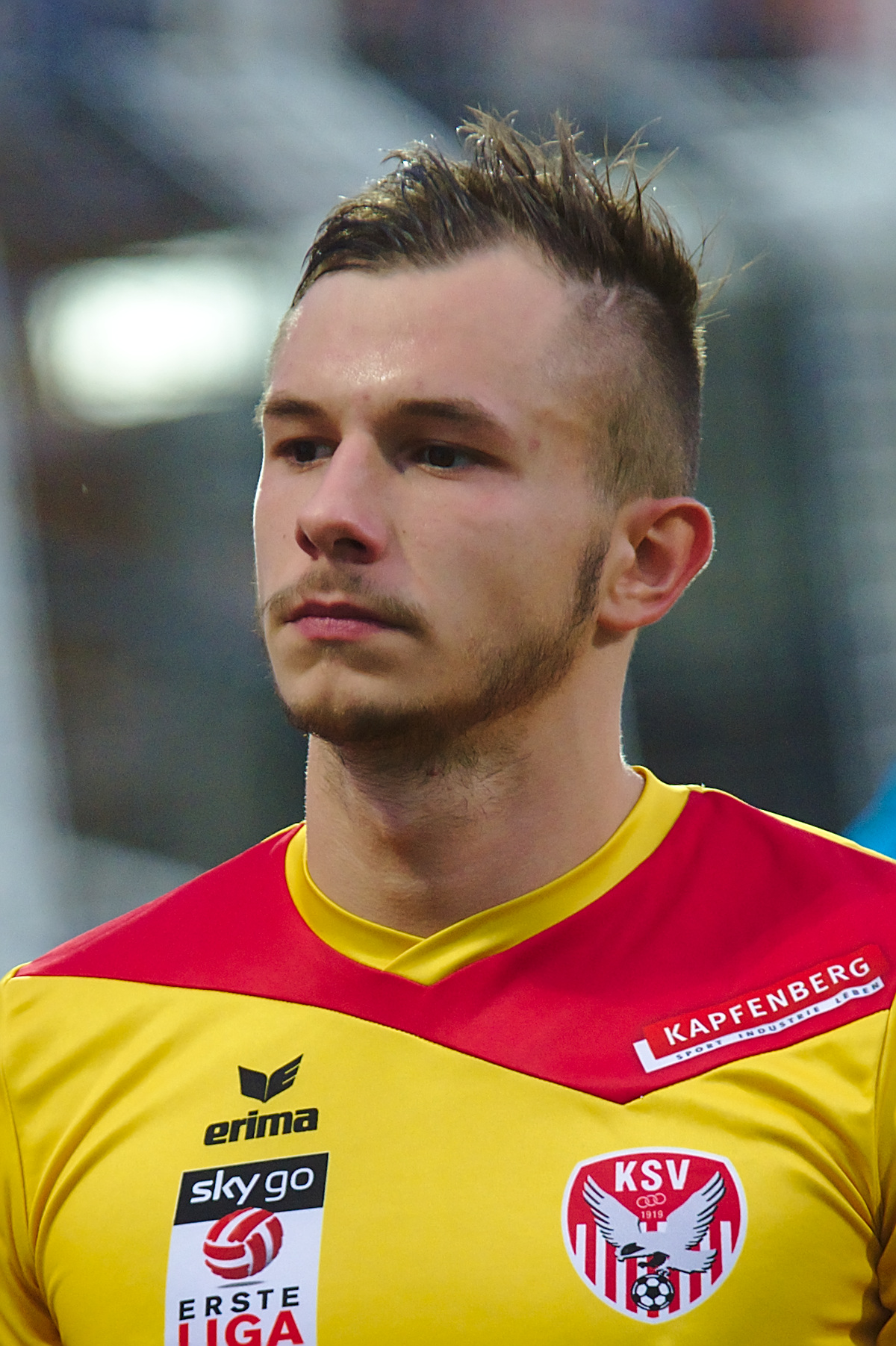
- Jutrić with Kapfenberger SV in 2017

Personal information
- Date of birth: 19 April 1996 (age 30)
- Place of birth: Salzburg, Austria
- Height: 1.84 m (6 ft 0 in)
- Position: Centre back

Team information
- Current team: FK Zvijezda 09
- Number: 15

Youth career
- 2001–2005: PSV Salzburg
- 2005–2013: Red Bull Salzburg

Senior career*
Years	Team	Apps	(Gls)
2013	FC Pinzgau Saalfelden	4	(0)
2013–2016	Seekirchen	71	(6)
2016–2017	Grödig	26	(3)
2017–2018	Kapfenberger SV	32	(1)
2019	Ehime	13	(1)
2020	Doxa Katokopias	4	(1)
2020–2022	Academica Clinceni	25	(1)
2023–	FK Zvijezda 09	3	(0)
- * Club domestic league appearances and goals as of 5 October 2023

Mladen Jutrić (Serbian Cyrillic: Младен Јутрић, born 19 April 1996) is an Austrian footballer who plays as a centre-back for FK Zvijezda 09.

== Club career ==
He made his Austrian Football First League debut for Kapfenberger SV on 21 July 2017 in a game against Liefering.
