= Markus Farnleitner =

Austrian footballer

Personal information
- Date of birth: 12 October 1993 (age 33)
- Place of birth: Graz, Austria
- Height: 1.77 m (5 ft 9 1/2 in)
- Position: Midfielder

Team information
- Current team: SC Kalsdorf
- Number: 6

Youth career
- 2001–2008: SC Weiz
- 2008–2012: SV Kapfenberg

Senior career*
Years	Team	Apps	(Gls)
2012–2016	Kapfenberger SV II	48	(4)
2013–2016	Kapfenberger SV	58	(2)
2016–2017	FC Gleisdorf 09	36	(4)
2018–2019	USV Mettersdorf	41	(2)
2019–2024	SV Wildon	103	(13)
2024–2025	FC Gamlitz	26	(1)
2025–	SC Kalsdorf	25	(0)
- * Club domestic league appearances and goals as of 22 June 2026

Markus Farnleitner (born 12 October 1993) is an Austrian footballer who plays for SC Kalsdorf.
