= Lukas Gabriel =

Austrian footballer

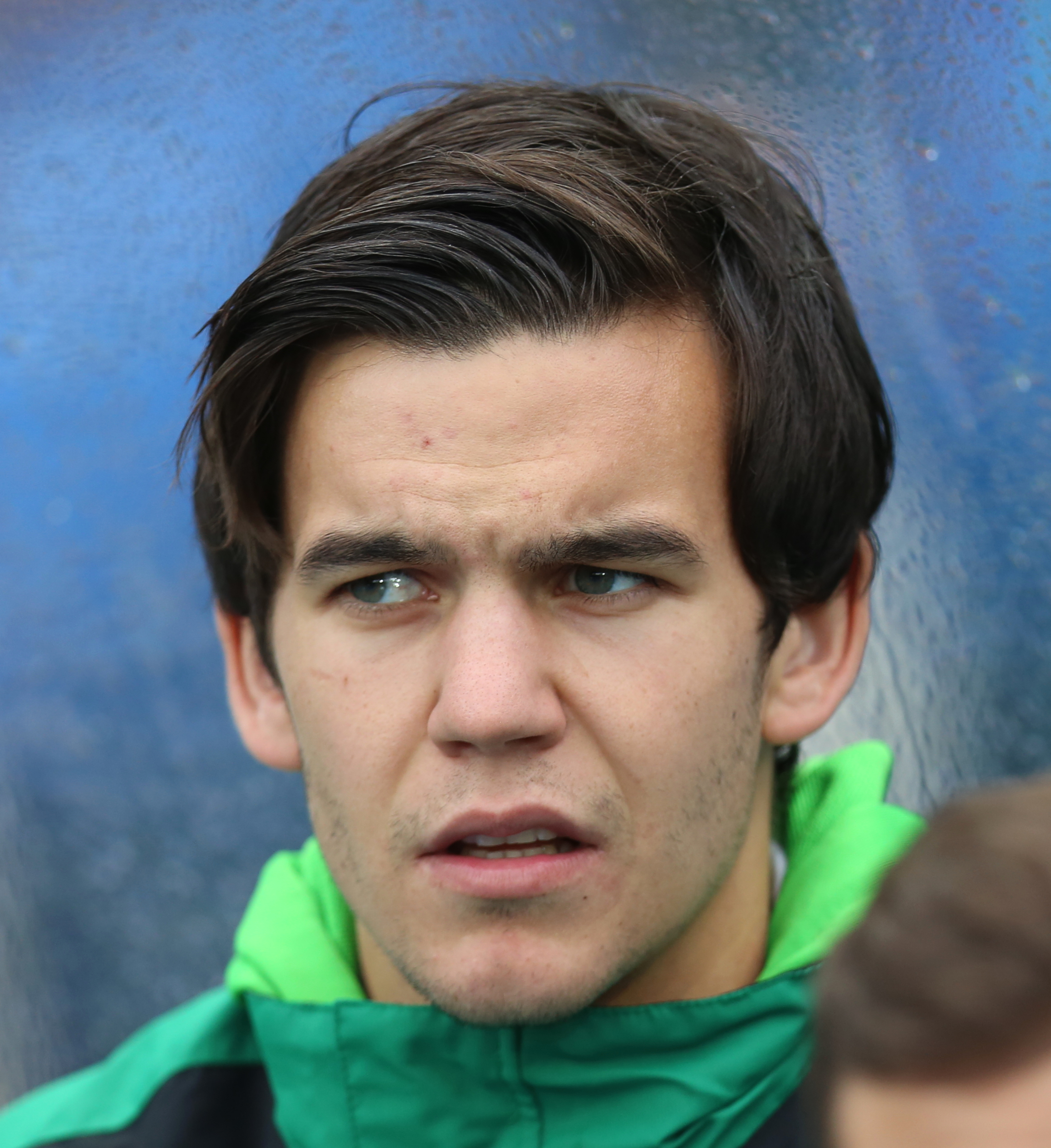

Personal information
- Full name: Lukas Gabriel
- Date of birth: 26 December 1991 (age 34)
- Place of birth: Austria
- Height: 1.93 m (6 ft 4 in)
- Position: Centre back

Team information
- Current team: Hertha Wels
- Number: 15

Senior career*
Years	Team	Apps	(Gls)
2008–2012	Ried	5	(0)
2011–2012	→ Wels (loan)	18	(0)
2012–2013	FC Pasching	12	(0)
2013–2014	St. Florian	15	(0)
2014	FC Pasching	6	(0)
2014–2018	Blau-Weiß Linz	113	(9)
2018–2019	Vorwärts Steyr	13	(0)
2019–	Hertha Wels	4	(0)

International career
2009	Austria U18	1	(0)
- * Club domestic league appearances and goals as of 15:46, 22 August 2019 (UTC)

Lukas Gabriel (born 26 December 1991) is an Austrian professional footballer who plays for Austrian Regionalliga club Hertha Wels. He plays as a centre back.

He previously played five matches in the Austrian Football Bundesliga for Ried, and in the Regional League for Wels and FC Pasching.

== Career ==
=== Hertha Wels ===
Ahead of the 2019/20 season, Gabriel joined Austrian Regionalliga club WSC Hertha Wels.
