= Milan Jurdík =

Slovak footballer

Personal information
- Full name: Milan Jurdík
- Date of birth: 8 November 1991 (age 35)
- Place of birth: Považská Bystrica, Czechoslovakia
- Height: 1.77 m (5 ft 10 in)
- Position: Forward

Youth career
- Sparta Prague

Senior career*
Years	Team	Apps	(Gls)
2009–2015	Sparta Prague	1	(0)
2010–2011	→ Příbram (loan)	19	(1)
2012	→ Zbrojovka Brno (loan)	10	(0)
2013	→ Baník Sokolov (loan)	28	(5)
2014	→ Karviná (loan)	8	(0)
2015–2016	Dynamo České Budějovice	27	(4)
2016–2020	WSG Wattens	104	(34)
2020–2021	Floridsdorfer AC	39	(12)
2021	Valletta	2	(0)
2021–2022	Senica	20	(4)
- * Club domestic league appearances and goals as of 19:34, 15 April 2022 (UTC)

Milan Jurdík (born 8 November 1991) is a Slovak professional footballer who plays as a forward.

== Career ==
=== Club career ===
Jurdík started his career in the Czech Republic with Sparta Prague. He made his professional debut in March 2010 in the Czech First League against Sigma Olomouc. It was his only game for Sparta. In the summer of 2010 he joined Příbram on loan until December 2011. After three more loan spells, he left Sparta in the summer of 2015 and joined the Dynamo České Budějovice.

For the 2016/17 season he moved to the Austrian Football Second League club WSG Wattens. He helped the club winning the league title and with promotion to the Austrian Football Bundesliga, after which the club was renamed WSG Tirol. After nine appearances in the Bundesliga and 95 in the second division, his contract was terminated in January 2020 and he moved to the second division club Floridsdorfer AC, where he signed a contract that ran until June 2021.

On 3 July 2021, Jurdík moved to Maltese club Valletta.
