= Roko Mišlov =

Croatian footballer

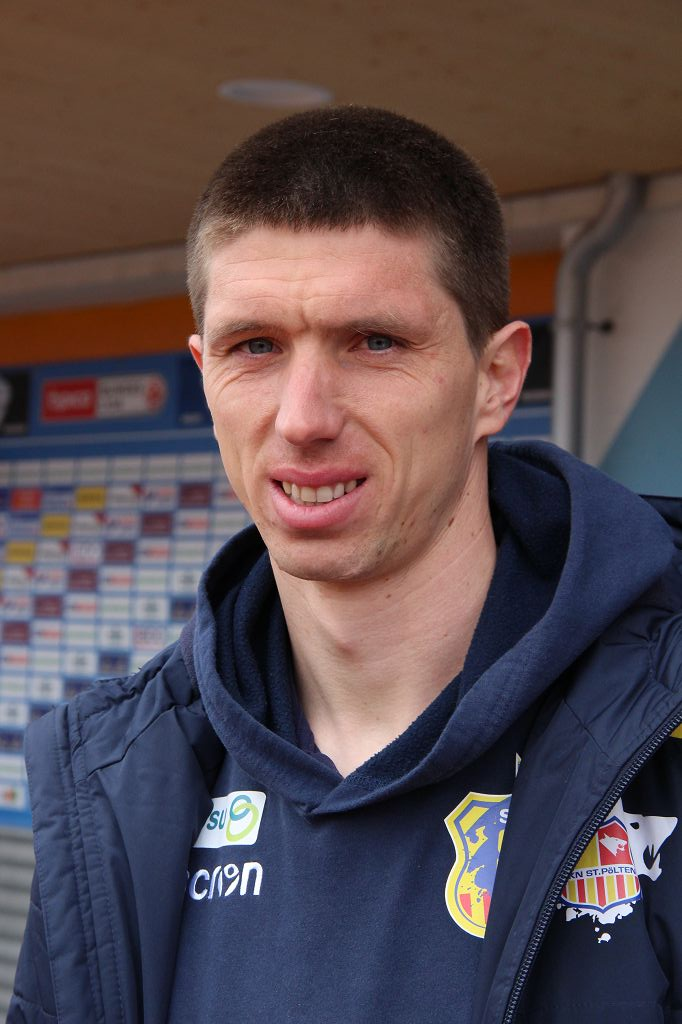

Personal information
- Date of birth: 26 May 1988 (age 38)
- Place of birth: Zadar, Croatia
- Height: 1.85 m (6 ft 1 in)
- Position: Midfielder

Team information
- Current team: SPG Wels
- Number: 6

Youth career
- –2006: NK Zadar

Senior career*
Years	Team	Apps	(Gls)
2006–2011	NK Zadar	17	(1)
2009	→ NK Velebit (loan)		
2009–2010	→ HNK Primorac (loan)		
2010–2011	→ NK Raštane (loan)		
2011–2012	HNK Primorac		
2012–2013	HNK Šibenik	37	(4)
2013–2018	TSV Hartberg	146	(27)
2018–2019	SKN St. Pölten	29	(0)
2019–2020	Miedź Legnica	8	(2)
2019–2020	Miedź Legnica II	4	(0)
2020	SV Horn	12	(0)
2020–	SPG Wels	94	(25)
- * Club domestic league appearances and goals as of 26 May 2024

Roko Mišlov (born 26 May 1988) is a Croatian footballer who plays as a midfielder for SPG Wels, which he captains.

== Club career ==
He made his Croatian First Football League debut for HNK Šibenik on 21 March 2012 in a game against NK Lokomotiva. He has been playing in Austria since 2013, except for a season in Poland.
