= Sandro Neurauter =

Austrian footballer

Sandro Neurater
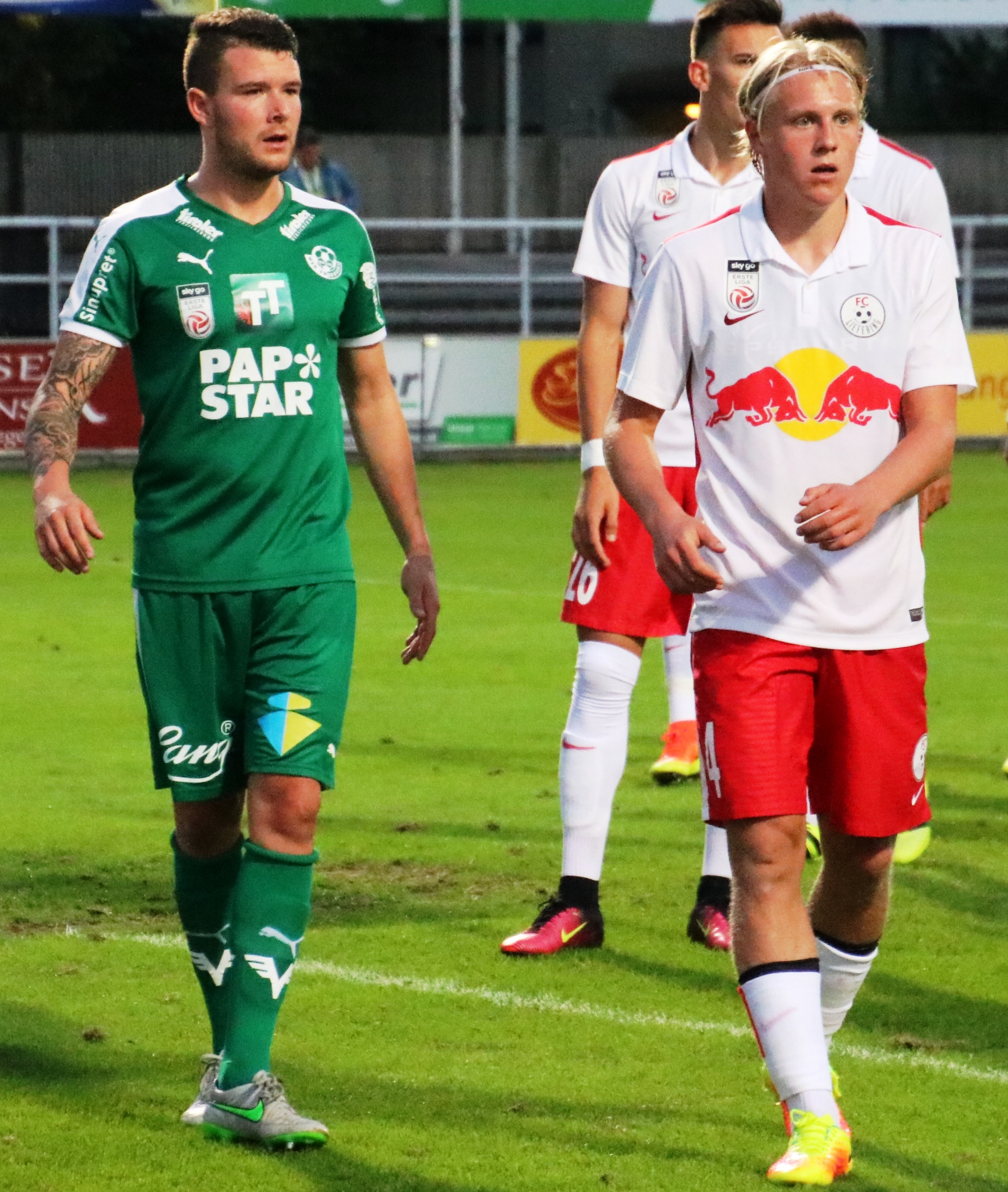
- Neurater (L) with WSG Wattens in 2016

Personal information
- Date of birth: 21 March 1992 (age 34)
- Position: Centre back

Team information
- Current team: SC Schwaz
- Number: 20

Youth career
- 1998–1999: FC Tarrenz
- 1999–2006: SC Imst
- 2006–2007: AKA Tirol

Senior career*
Years	Team	Apps	(Gls)
2007–2011	SC Imst		
2011	FC Union Innsbruck	14	(0)
2011–2016	SC Imst		
2016–2020	WSG Swarovski Tirol	82	(0)
2020	WSG Swarovski Tirol II	11	(1)
2021–	SC Schwaz	134	(15)
- * Club domestic league appearances and goals as of 27 June 2026

Sandro Neurater (born 21 March 1992) is an Austrian football player. He plays for SC Schwaz.

== Club career ==
He made his Austrian Football First League debut for WSG Wattens on 22 July 2016 in a game against FC Blau-Weiß Linz.
