= Christoph Kröpfl =

Austrian footballer

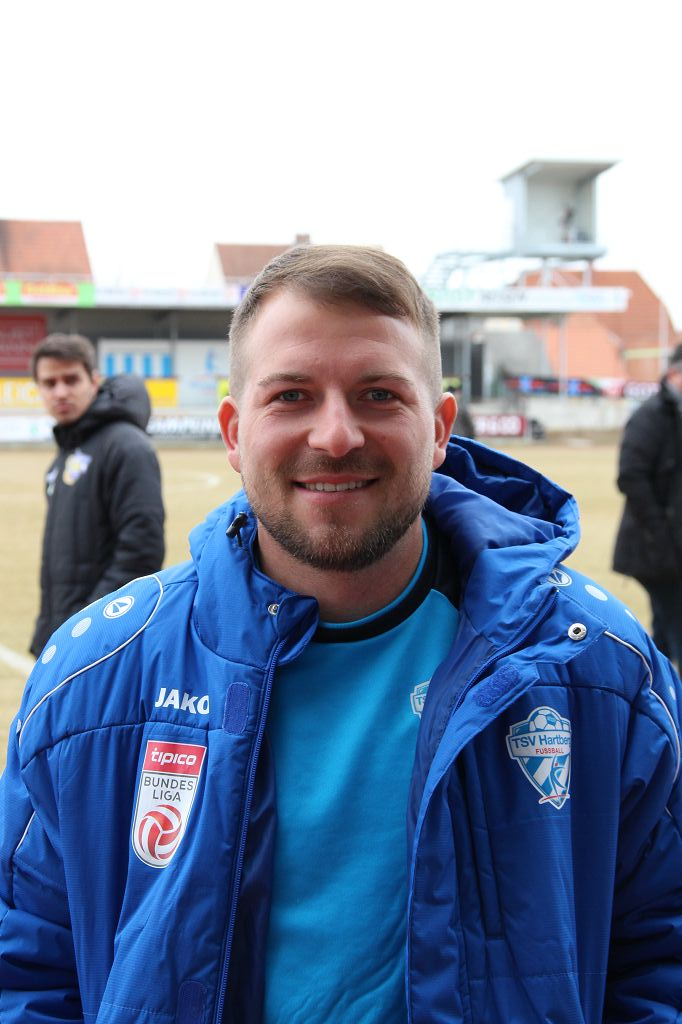

Personal information
- Date of birth: 4 May 1990 (age 36)
- Place of birth: Graz, Austria
- Height: 1.70 m (5 ft 7 in)
- Position: Right midfielder

Team information
- Current team: FC Marchfeld
- Number: 10

Youth career
- 1997–2001: ESV Austria Graz
- 2001–2007: Sturm Graz

Senior career*
Years	Team	Apps	(Gls)
2006–2009	Sturm Graz II	32	(11)
2007–2009	Sturm Graz	6	(0)
2009–2010	Red Bull Juniors Salzburg	33	(5)
2009–2011	Red Bull Salzburg	1	(0)
2010–2011	→ SV Kapfenberg (loan)	19	(1)
2011–2012	SV Kapfenberg	3	(0)
2012–2014	Sturm Graz	39	(0)
2014–2016	TSV Hartberg	52	(10)
2016	FC Ritzing	13	(1)
2016–2020	TSV Hartberg	114	(8)
2020–2021	SV Lafnitz	25	(4)
2021–	FC Marchfeld	35	(3)

International career
2006	Austria U-17	6	(0)
2008	Austria U-19	5	(1)
2009	Austria U-20	1	(0)
2010–2011	Austria U-21	7	(0)
- * Club domestic league appearances and goals as of 19:56, 5 March 2023 (UTC)

Christoph Kröpfl (born 4 May 1990) is an Austrian footballer who plays as a midfielder for FC Marchfeld Donauauen in the Austrian Regionalliga East.

== Club career ==
Born in Graz, Kröpfl started playing football with the ESV Austria Graz. Later he joined the Sturm Graz Akademie to make his professional debut for SK Sturm Graz in the 2007/2008 season against SV Ried. In summer 2009 he joined FC Red Bull Salzburg. There he plays for the second Team, Salzburg Juniors, at first. In December 2009 he gave his debut in the first squad playing versus FC Kärnten, where he came in minute 63 for Somen Tchoyi.

Since 2010 he is on loan in Kapfenberg playing for SV Kapfenberg.

He played for the Austria national teams from U-16 to U-21.
