= Aleksandar Đorđević (footballer, born 1981) =

Austrian footballer

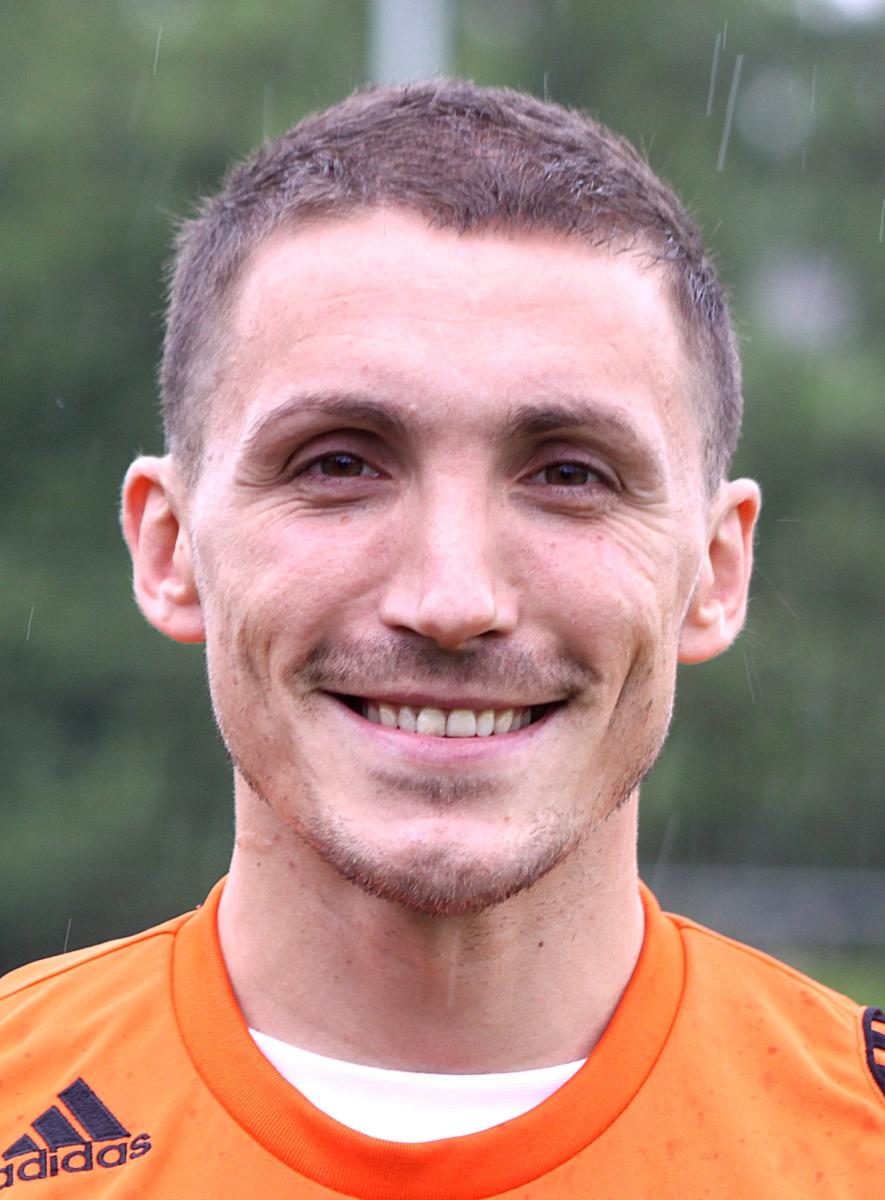

Personal information
- Date of birth: 29 July 1981 (age 45)
- Place of birth: Bregenz, Austria
- Height: 1.69 m (5 ft 6 1/2 in)
- Position: Defender

Youth career
- 1993–1998: FC Wolfurt

Senior career*
Years	Team	Apps	(Gls)
1998–2001	SW Bregenz II		
2001–2004	Viktoria Bregenz		
2004–2005	SC Austria Lustenau	27	(2)
2005–2006	SC Schwanenstadt	16	(1)
2006–2007	Wiener SC	10	(0)
2007–2008	First Vienna	18	(0)
2008–2017	SV Horn	257	(28)
2017–2018	ASKÖ Oedt	16	(0)
2018–2020	FC Wolfurt		
- * Club domestic league appearances and goals as of 29 January 2017

Aleksandar Đorđević (born 21 July 1981) is an Austrian former professional footballer.
