= Siegfried Rasswalder =

Austrian footballer

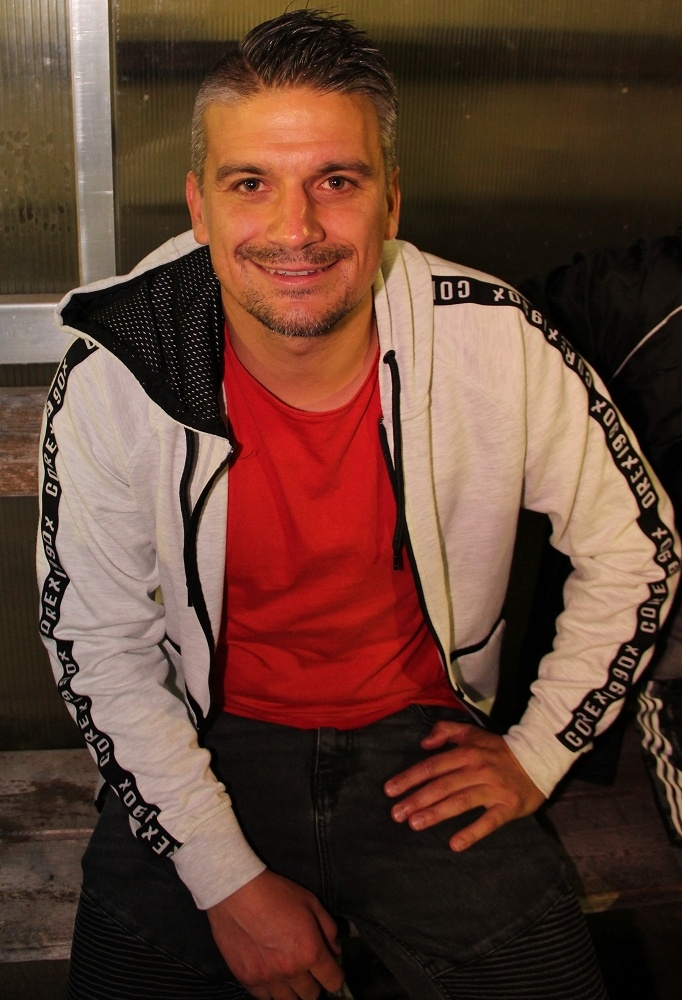
- Rasswalder in 2022

Personal information
- Full name: Siegfried Rasswalder
- Date of birth: 13 May 1987 (age 39)
- Place of birth: Austria
- Height: 1.75 m (5 ft 9 in)
- Position: Defender

Team information
- Current team: ESV Knittelfeld

Senior career*
Years	Team	Apps	(Gls)
2004–2008	DSV Leboen	60	(1)
2008–2010	LASK Linz	20	(1)
2010–2011	SV Horn	19	(0)
2011–2013	SK Austria Klagenfurt	41	(1)
2013–2020	TSV Hartberg	197	(6)
2020–	ESV Knittelfeld	0	(0)

International career
2007–2008	Austria under-20	10	(0)
2008	Austria under-21	1	(0)
- * Club domestic league appearances and goals as of 5 July 2020

Siegfried Rasswalder (born 13 May 1987) is an Austrian football player who plays for ESV Knittelfeld.
