= Florian Jamnig =

Austrian footballer

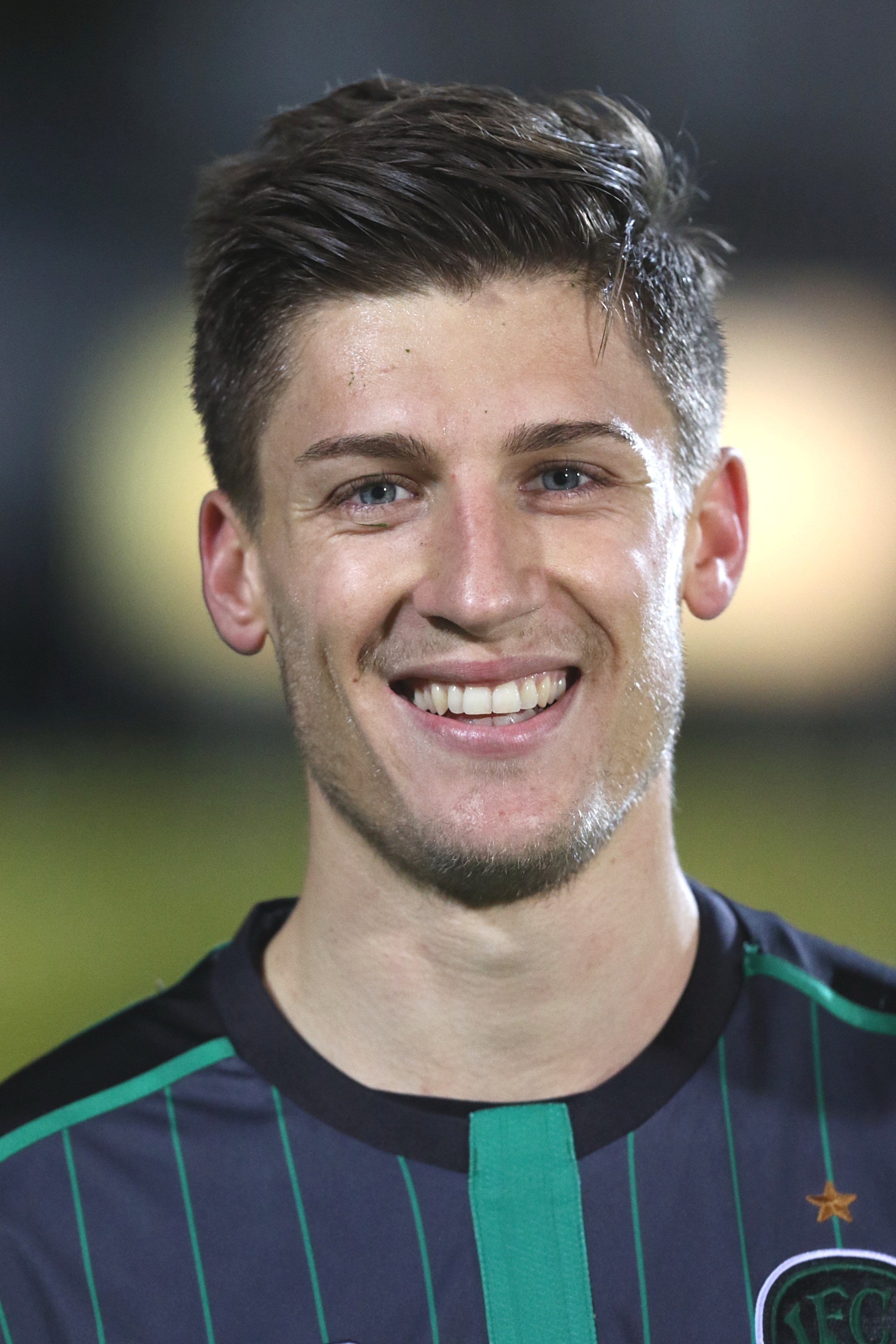

Personal information
- Date of birth: 11 November 1990 (age 36)
- Place of birth: Innsbruck, Austria
- Height: 1.83 m (6 ft 0 in)
- Position: Midfielder

Team information
- Current team: SC Imst
- Number: 7

Senior career*
Years	Team	Apps	(Gls)
2007	Wacker Tirol	1	(0)
2010–2011	Wacker Innsbruck II	21	(0)
2011–2012	FC Union Innsbruck	23	(5)
2012–2014	WSG Wattens	57	(10)
2014	Wacker Innsbruck II	7	(1)
2014–2018	Wacker Innsbruck	74	(7)
2018–2019	LASK	15	(1)
2019–2020	SCR Altach	11	(1)
2020–2022	Wacker Innsbruck	53	(5)
2022–	SC Imst	81	(28)
- * Club domestic league appearances and goals as of 26 June 2026

Florian Jamnig (born 11 November 1990) is an Austrian footballer who plays for Austrian Regionalliga West club SC Imst.

== Club career ==
On 30 July 2020, he returned to Wacker Innsbruck.
