= Armin Hamzic =

Austrian footballer

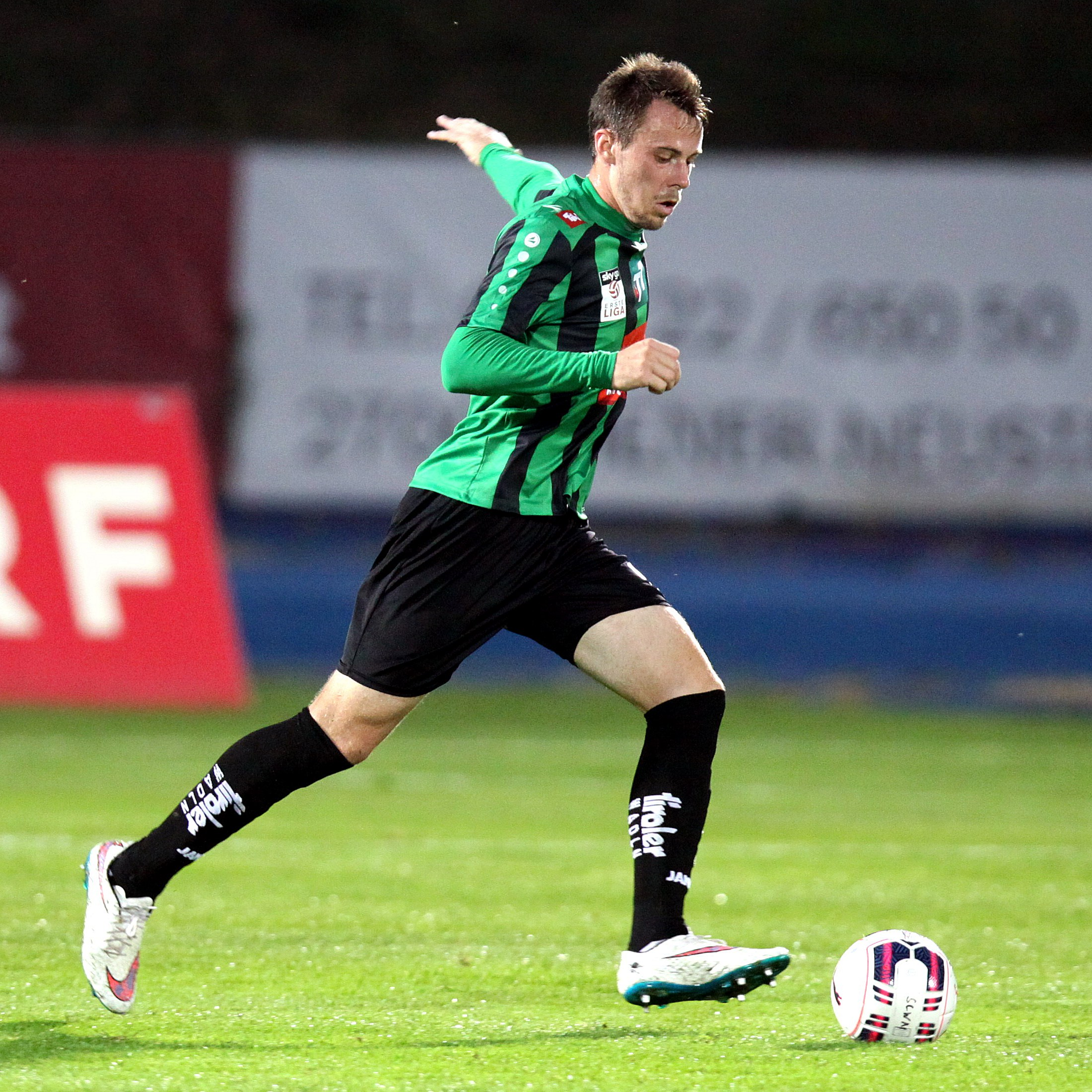
- Hamsic in 2015

Personal information
- Date of birth: 30 December 1993 (age 32)
- Place of birth: Innsbruck, Austria
- Height: 1.81 m (5 ft 11 1/2 in)
- Position: Midfielder

Team information
- Current team: FC Wacker Innsbruck II
- Number: 51

Youth career
- 2003–2007: SV Axams
- 2007–2008: FC Wacker Innsbruck
- 2008–2009: SV Axams
- 2009–2010: AKA Tirol
- 2010–2011: SK Rapid Wien

Senior career*
Years	Team	Apps	(Gls)
2011–2014	SK Rapid Wien II	10	(1)
2012–2013	→ FC Wacker Innsbruck II (loan)	23	(0)
2014	→ FC Wacker Innsbruck (loan)	7	(0)
2014–2018	FC Wacker Innsbruck II	10	(2)
2014–2018	FC Wacker Innsbruck	100	(3)
2019–	FC Wacker Innsbruck II	6	(0)

International career
2010	Austria U16	1	(0)
- * Club domestic league appearances and goals as of 14:32, 29 April 2019 (UTC)

Armin Hamzic (born 30 December 1993) is an Austrian footballer who plays for FC Wacker Innsbruck II.

== Career ==
Hamzic rejoined FC Wacker Innsbruck on 18 January 2019, where he was registered for their reserve team.
