= Daniel Geissler =

Austrian footballer

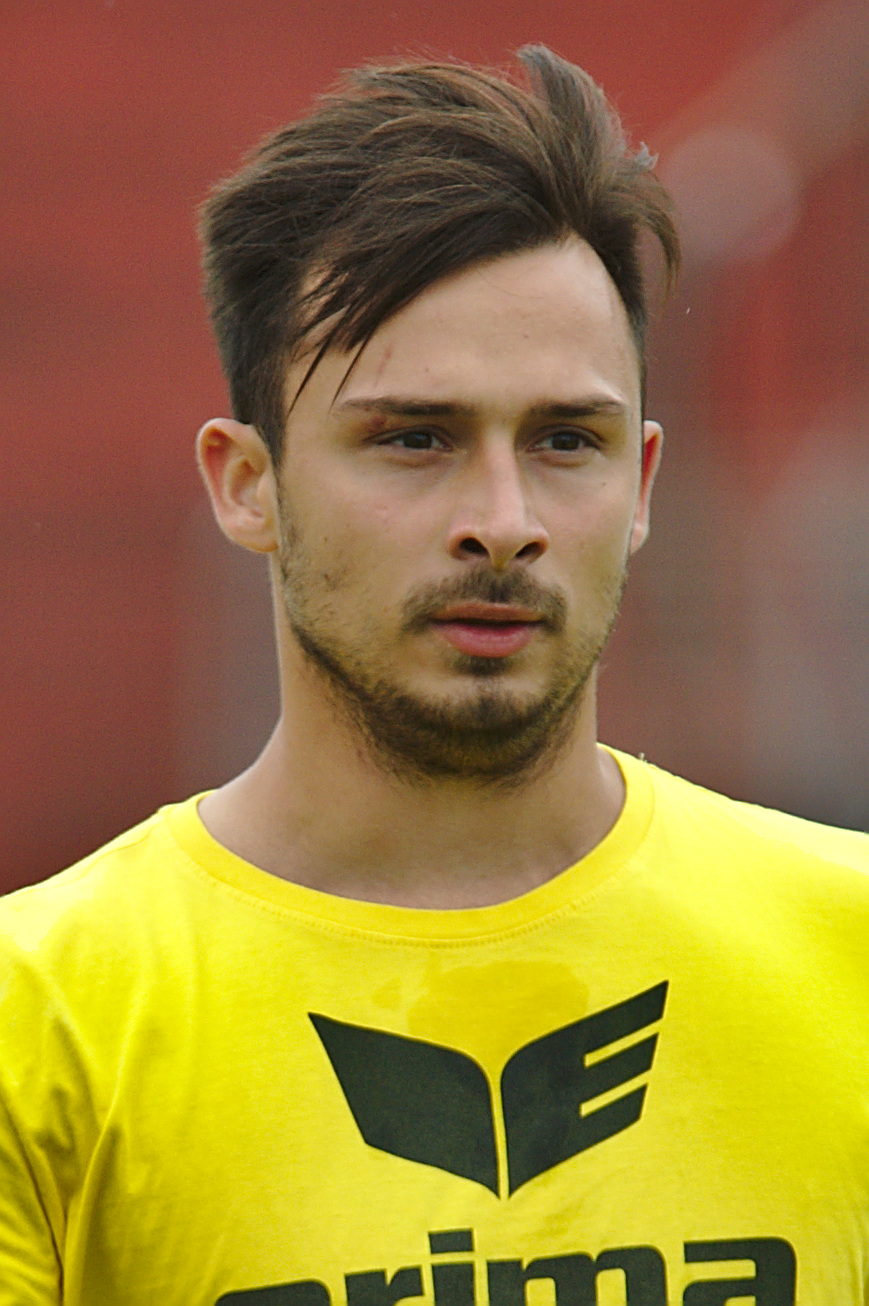

Personal information
- Date of birth: 30 April 1994 (age 32)
- Place of birth: Feldbach, Austria
- Height: 1.71 m (5 ft 7 1/2 in)
- Position: Midfielder

Team information
- Current team: Grazer AK (on loan from TSV Hartberg)
- Number: 38

Senior career*
Years	Team	Apps	(Gls)
2012–2014	SC Heerenveen II		
2014–2016	FC Schalke 04 II	6	(0)
2016–2018	Kapfenberger SV	48	(6)
2018–	TSV Hartberg	0	(0)
2019–	→ Grazer AK (loan)	2	(1)

International career
2009–2010	Austria U-16	2	(0)
2010–2011	Austria U-17	7	(0)
2012–2013	Austria U-19	9	(1)
2015	Austria U-21	2	(0)
- * Club domestic league appearances and goals as of 7 April 2019

Daniel Geissler (born 30 April 1994) is an Austrian footballer currently playing for Grazer AK on loan from TSV Hartberg. Besides Austria, he has played in the Netherlands and Germany.
