= 2017–18 Austrian Cup =

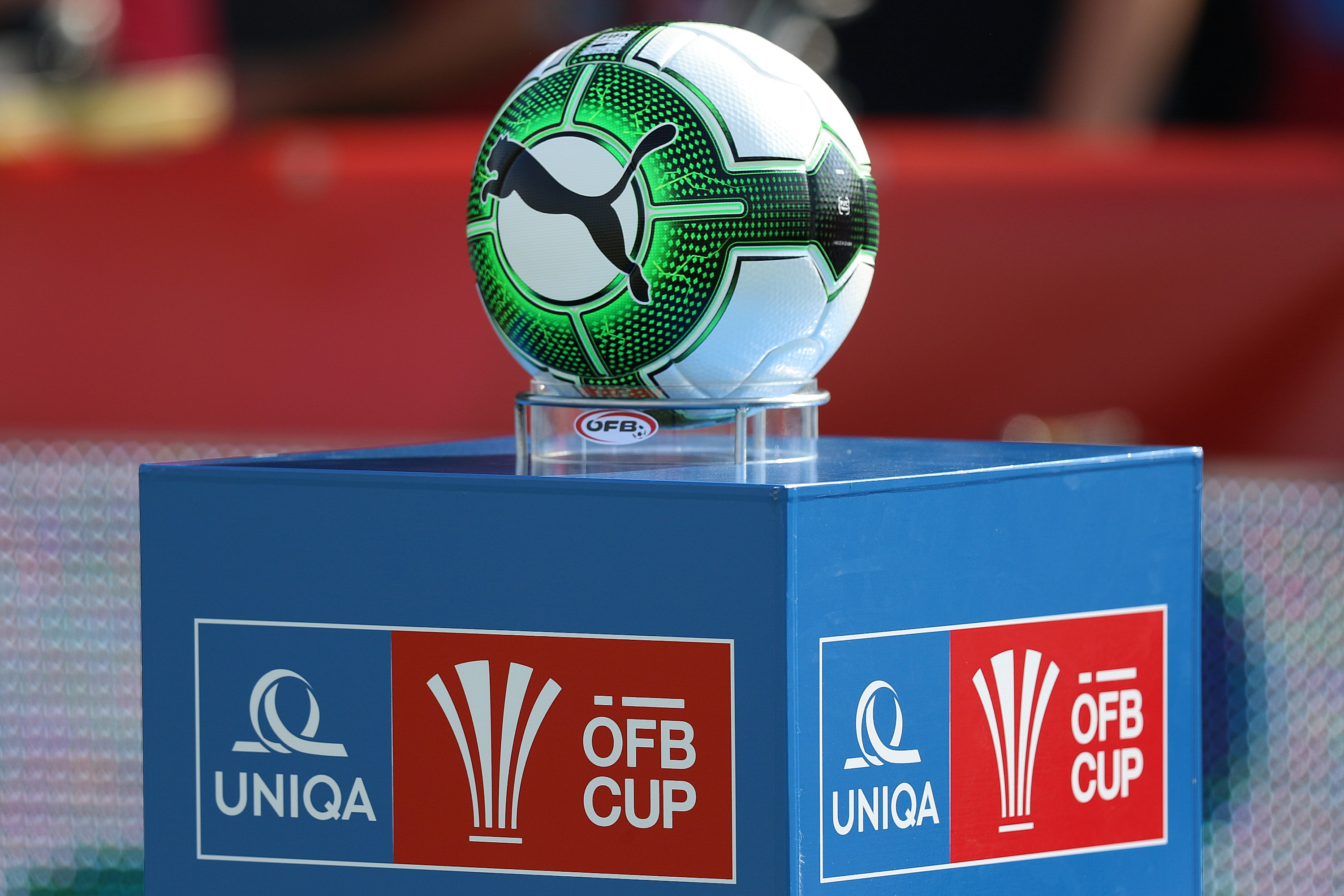

Tournament details
- Country: Austria
- Teams: 64

Final positions
- Champions: Sturm Graz
- Runners-up: Red Bull Salzburg

Tournament statistics
- Matches played: 63
- Goals scored: 234 (3.71 per match)
- Top goal scorer(s): Dario Tadić (5 goals)

The 2017–18 Austrian Cup was the 84th edition of the national cup in Austrian football. The champions of the cup, Sturm Graz, earned a place in the 2018–19 Europa League and would have begun play in the third qualifying round. Sixty–four clubs participated in this season's cup competition.

Red Bull Salzburg were the defending champions after winning the competition in the previous season by defeating SK Rapid Wien in the final.

== First round ==
Thirty–two first round matches were played between 14 and 18 July 2017.

14 July 2017	Ebreichsdorf (3)	0–0 (a.e.t.) (3–4 p)	Austria Wien (1)	Weigelsdorf
10:30	Markic (yellow card) 44'; Pomer (yellow card) 56'	Report	Holzhauser (red card) 43'; Pires (yellow card) 54'; Prokop (yellow card) 60'; Friesenbichler (yellow card) 74'; Larsen (yellow card) 74'; Grünwald (yellow card) 90+3'	Stadium: Sportzentrum Ebreichsdorf; Attendance: 2,300; Referee: Dieter Muckenhammer
	Penalties
	Gusic (penalty scored); Pomer (penalty scored); Marcik (penalty missed); Bauer (penalty scored); Vukajlovic (penalty missed)		Larsen (penalty scored); Filipovic (penalty scored); Pires (penalty scored); Westermann (penalty missed); Grünwald (penalty scored)

14 July 2017	Oedt (4)	3–1	Stadl-Paura (3)	Traun
10:30	Schmidl 30'; Dragojevic (yellow card) 48'; Vujanovic 52'; Anițoiu (red card) 52'; Strasser (yellow card) 75'; Pervan 88'	Report	Ravelo (yellow card) 43' (goal) 60'	Stadium: Transdanubia Sportanlage; Attendance: 450; Referee: Thomas Fröhlacher

14 July 2017	SK Vorwärts Steyr (3)	1–4 (a.e.t.)	Wacker Innsbruck (2)	Steyr
11:55	Himmelfreundpointner 26'; Martinović (yellow card) 75'; Wimmer (yellow card) 76'	Report	Yılmaz 71'; Lercher (yellow card) 90+2'; Kerschbaum (yellow card) 90+7' (goal) 110'; Rieder 97'; Jamnig 116'	Stadium: Life Radio Arena; Attendance: 3,300; Referee: Christian-Petru Ciochirca

14 July 2017	TSV St. Johann (3)	0–1	Kapfenberger SV (2)	St Johann im Pongau
12:00	Beran (yellow card) 4'; Pertl (yellow card) 65'; Hupf (yellow card) 90+1'	Report	Fuček 50'; Grgić (yellow card) 90+2'	Stadium: Sportplatz St. Johann; Attendance: 500; Referee: Felix Ouschan

14 July 2017	SC Weiz (3)	2–1	Lafnitz (3)	Weiz
12:00	Gabbichler 72'; Prskalo 81'	Report	Rodler 27'; Zingl 38'; Frljužec (yellow card) 78'	Stadium: Siemens Energy Stadion; Attendance: 230; Referee: Bernd Eigler

14 July 2017	Kalsdorf (3)	0–2	Neusiedl (3)	Kalsdorf bei Graz
12:00	Hofper (yellow card) 40'; Memić (yellow card) 65'; Škurla (yellow card) 87'; Zisser (yellow card) 90+2'	Report	Steinacher 12' (pen.); Szegner (yellow card) 25'; Enguelle (yellow card) 35'; Salamon 50' (yellow card) 68'; Gregora (yellow card) 90+2'; Wodicka (yellow card) 90+2'	Stadium: Sportzentrum Kalsdorf; Attendance: 200; Referee: Alain Sadikovski

14 July 2017	Parndorf (3)	2–1 (a.e.t.)	First Vienna (5)	Parndorf
12:00	Dilic 12'; Stanisic 78'; Kummerer (yellow card) 91'; Ljubic 114'	Report	Katzer 11' (yellow card) 63'; Baldia (yellow card) 70'	Stadium: Heidebodenstadion; Attendance: 600; Referee: Gabriel Gmeiner

14 July 2017	Seekirchen (3)	1–2 (a.e.t.)	SV Grödig (3)	Seekirchen am Wallersee
12:00	Starzer (yellow card) 12'; Biribauer (yellow card) 36'; Matscher (yellow card) 77'; Obermüller 86'; Smoljan (yellow card) 107'	Report	Berger (yellow card) 30'; Jukić 76', 117'; Omerović (yellow card) 77'; Strobl (yellow card) 86'	Stadium: Sportzentrum Seekirchen; Attendance: 450; Referee: Markus Tiefgraber

14 July 2017	Union Vöcklamarkt (3)	7–0	Wörgl (3)	Vöcklamarkt
12:00	Höltschl 6'; Fröschl 35'; Leitner 45', 54'; Rensch 63' (pen.); Hofmeister (yellow card) 73'; Holzinger 77'; Olivotto 82'	Report		Stadium: Sportzentrum Union Volksbank Vöcklamarkt; Attendance: 519; Referee: Christian Struz

14 July 2017	SKU Amstetten (3)	1–0	SC Wiener Neustadt (2)	Amstetten
12:30	Madl (yellow card) 18'; Deinhofer (yellow card) 48'; Vukovic 79' (yellow card) 90+5'; Schibany (yellow card) 80'	Report	Maderner (yellow card) 17'; Schierl (yellow card) 90+5'	Stadium: Ertl Glas-Stadion; Attendance: 1,150; Referee: Alan Kijas

14 July 2017	SV Horn (2)	3–1	Floridsdorfer AC (3)	Horn
12:30	Preininger 2'; Kawanaka 49'; Kirschner 81'	Report	Gashi 24'	Stadium: Waldviertler Volksbank Arena; Attendance: 650; Referee: Stefan Ebner

14 July 2017	Bad Sauerbrunn (4)	0–4	Bruck/Leitha (3)	Bad Sauerbrunn
12:30	Strongl (yellow card) 82'	Report	Salkic 28', 52'; Felix (yellow card) 53'; Pospichal (yellow card) 75'; Burusic 78'; Sadovic 80'	Stadium: Wetterkreuzstadion Bad Sauerbrunn; Attendance: 366; Referee: Mile Lukic

15 July 2017	Deutschlandsberger (3)	0–7	Red Bull Salzburg (1)	Deutschlandsberg
10:00	Wotole (yellow card) 37' (yellow-red card) 40'	Report	Stangl 34'; Hwang Hee-chan 37' (pen.); Minamino 45'; Berisha 53', 88'; Gulbrandsen 57', 61'	Stadium: Koralmstadion; Attendance: 2,000; Referee: Manuel Schüttengruber

15 July 2017	Lendorf (4)	1–3	Admira Wacker Mödling (1)	Lendorf
10:00	Allmayer (yellow card) 17'; Morgenstern 37' (yellow card) 43'; Huber (yellow card) 39'; Nagy (yellow card) 90+1'; Mataln (yellow card) 90+1'	Report	Spiridonović 26' (pen.), 52'; Sax (yellow card) 40'; Grozurek 90+3' (pen.)	Stadium: Thomas-Morgenstern-Arena; Attendance: 565; Referee: Julian Weinberger

15 July 2017	Pinzgau Saalfelden (3)	1–6	Mattersburg (1)	Saalfelden am Steinernen Meer
10:00	Stegmann (yellow card) 48'; Anželj 76'; Herzog (yellow card) 86'	Report	Maierhofer 3', 27' (pen.); Jano 20'; Ertlthaler 34'; Novak (yellow card) 50'; Prevljak 62'; Sittsam 79'	Stadium: Sportanlage Bürgerau; Attendance: 800; Referee: Andreas Heiss

15 July 2017	Kitzbühel (3)	0–1	LASK (1)	Kitzbühel
10:00	Gruber (yellow card) 77'; Baur (yellow card) 85'	Report	Michorl 86'	Stadium: Sportplatz Langau; Attendance: 717; Referee: Robert Schörgenhofer

15 July 2017	Wiener SK (3)	0–4	SV Ried (2)	Vienna
10:00	Feldmann (yellow card) 60'; Fila (yellow card) 85'	Report	Fila 53' (o.g.); Mayer 58'; Boateng 65'; Surdanovic 90'	Stadium: Sportclub-Platz; Attendance: 1,511; Referee: Alexander Harkam

15 July 2017	Stripfing (4)	0–1	SC Austria Lustenau (2)	Stripfing
10:00	Mirvic (yellow card) 72'; Weber (yellow card) 90+1'	Report	Lovrić (yellow card) 27'; Drazan 49'	Stadium: Sportplatz Stripfing SV; Attendance: 400; Referee: Gerhard Grobelnik

15 July 2017	ATUS Ferlach (4)	1–3	FC Gleisdorf 09 (3)	Ferlach
10:30	Orgonyi 60'	Report	Färber 15', 38'; Kothleitner 29'	Stadium: Sportsplatz Ferlach; Attendance: 280; Referee: Manfred Erlinger

15 July 2017	FC Stadlau (3)	1–2	Wimpassing (4)	Vienna
10:30	Atan 58'	Report	Sara (yellow card) 26'; Sistek 37'; Erben (yellow card) 49'; Bortel 67'; Divljak (yellow card) 90'	Stadium: OMV-Sportanlage Stadlau; Attendance: 281; Referee: Markus Katona

15 July 2017	FC Liefering (3)	5–1	FC Kufstein (3)	Anif
10:30	Hödl 35' (pen.), 48', 87'; Wallner 75'; Weberbauer 88'	Report	Hesina (yellow card) 28' (goal) 68'; Duda (yellow card) 20'; Buljubasic (yellow card) 63'	Stadium: Sportzentrum Anif; Attendance: 100; Referee: Schedler Pascal

15 July 2017	VfB Hohenems (3)	3–4	Gurten (3)	Hohenems
11:00	Stefanon 18'; Klammer 79'; Dursum (yellow card) 82' (yellow-red card) 90+3'; Pernstich (yellow card) 83'; Ndure 86'; Gaye (yellow card) 90+1'	Report	Burghuber (yellow card) 30'; Kolakovic 50'; Zirnitzer 72' (yellow card) 83'; Gerner 76', 86'	Stadium: Herrenriedstadion; Attendance: 500; Referee: Daniel Pfister

15 July 2017	SC Mannsdorf (3)	1–2	Wolfsberger AC (1)	Mannsdorf
12:00	Panić 34'; Strapajevic (yellow card) 40'; Sütcü (yellow card) 68'; Bencun (yellow card) 74'; Sütcü (yellow card) 86'	Report	Ouédraogo 36'; Nutz 58'; Offenbacher (yellow card) 59'; Rnić (yellow card) 64'; Zündel (yellow card) 81'; Hüttenbrenner (yellow card) 89'	Stadium: Aulandstadion; Attendance: 400; Referee: Harald Lechner

15 July 2017	Bad Gleichenberg (3)	5–1	WSG Wattens (2)	Bad Gleichenberg
12:00	Otter (yellow card) 16'; Wendler 35', 78', 79'; Kaufmann 66'; Krenn 75'	Report	Jurdík 18'	Stadium: Bad Gleichenberg Arena; Attendance: 409; Referee: Josef Spurny

16 July 2017	Schwarzach (4)	0–3	Union St. Florian (3)	Schwarzach
13:30	Kovacec (yellow card) 88'	Report	Dramac 38'; Pilz 78'; Schneider 81'	Stadium: Sportplatz Schwarzach; Attendance: 250; Referee: Engin Işgören

16 July 2017	FC Dornbirn 1913 (3)	1–5	Rheindorf Altach (1)	Dornbirn
14:00	Gurschler 20'; Malin (yellow card) 20'; Allgäuer (yellow card) 41'	Report	Gebauer 7'; Salomon 14' (yellow card) 48'; Zwischenbrugger (yellow card) 17'; Grbić 21' (pen.), 59'; Ngamaleu 85'	Stadium: Stadion Birkenwiese; Attendance: 3,000; Referee: Walter Altmann

16 July 2017	FC Hard (3)	0–3	Sturm Graz (1)	Hard
08:30	Yasar (red card) 32'; Batir (yellow card) 55'	Report	Schubert 74', 90+5'; Alar 90+1'	Stadium: Waldstadion Hard; Attendance: 1,800; Referee: Sebastian Gishamer

16 July 2017	SC Schwaz (3)	0–2	Rapid Wien (1)	Schwaz
09:00	Probst (yellow card) 19'	Report	Auer 7' (yellow card) 64'; Schwab 75'	Stadium: Silberstadt Arena Schwaz; Attendance: 1,600; Referee: Christopher Jäger

16 July 2017	Elektra (4)	2–1	Traiskirchen (3)	Vienna
09:00	Selmani 10' (yellow card) 87' (yellow-red card) 89'; Kalser (yellow card) 42' (yellow-red card) 88'; Chiorean 68' (pen.); Soura (yellow card) 64'	Report	Haas 39'; Oravec (yellow card) 42'	Stadium: Sportplatz Elektra; Attendance: 150; Referee: Florian Jandl

16 July 2017	FC Karabakh Wien (3)	1–5	FC Blau-Weiß Linz (2)	Vienna
09:00	Kara 13'	Report	Kreuzer 6'; Templ 23', 59'; Schagerl 34', 43'; Skrivanek (yellow card) 62'	Stadium: Sportplatz Kaiserebersdorf; Attendance: 700; Referee: Markus Hameter

16 July 2017	SAK Klagenfurt (4)	0–5	TSV Hartberg (2)	Klagenfurt am Wörthersee
11:30	Aleksic (yellow card) 32'; Dlopst (yellow card) 55' (yellow-red card) 75'; Vukovic (yellow card) 65'	Report	Mišlov 2'; Siegl (yellow card) 24'; Kröpfl 37'; Fischer 50'; Tadić 63' (pen.); Rotter 75'; Gollner (yellow card) 88'	Stadium: Sportplatz Welzenegg; Attendance: 1,000; Referee: Arnes Talic

18 July 2017	Austria Klagenfurt (3)	2–1	St. Pölten (1)	Klagenfurt am Wörthersee
11:30	Jaritz 13', 37'; Zakany (yellow card) 90'; Pelko (yellow card) 90+5'	Report	Huber (yellow card) 73'; Riski 90+2'	Stadium: Sportpark Klagenfurt; Attendance: 700; Referee: Rene Eisner

== Second round ==
Second round matches were played 18–26 September 2017. The draw for the second round was held 8 August 2017.

18 September 2017	Wimpassing (4)	3–3 (a.e.t.) (3–2 p)	FC Blau-Weiß Linz (2)	Wimpassing an der Leitha
	Sistek 6'; Egharevba 13'; Markovic (yellow card) 49'; Divljak (yellow card) 94'; Radulović (yellow card) 109' (goal) 110'		Huspek 30' (yellow card) 113'; Oppong (red card); Schagerl 81'; Templ (yellow card) 90+1' (goal) 102'; Haudum (yellow card) 104'	Stadium: Sportplatz Wimpassing; Attendance: 319; Referee: Sebastian Gishamer
	Penalties
	Egharevba (penalty scored); Sistek (penalty missed); Topić (penalty missed); Dau (penalty missed); Sara (penalty scored); Bortel (penalty scored)		Halilović (penalty missed); Gabriel (penalty scored); Schagerl (penalty missed); Kerschbaumer (penalty scored); Haudum (penalty missed); Huspek (penalty missed)

19 September 2017	Oedt (4)	2–0	SC Austria Lustenau (2)	Traun
09:00	Reiter 60'; Djordjevic 76'	Report		Stadium: Transdanubia Sportanlage; Attendance: 400; Referee: Christopher Jäger

19 September 2017	FC Gleisdorf 09 (3)	1–2	Wolfsberger AC (1)	Gleisdorf
12:00	Suppan (yellow card) 6'; Weiss 66' (yellow card) 83'	Report	Topčagić 17' (yellow card) 58'; Orgill 75'	Stadium: Stadtgemeinde Gleisdorf Solarstadion; Attendance: 700; Referee: Oliver Drachta

19 September 2017	Neusiedl (3)	0–1	SV Ried (2)	Neusiedl am See
12:00		Report	Boateng 52'	Stadium: Sportzentrum Neusiedl; Attendance: 350; Referee: Alan Kijas

19 September 2017	SV Grödig (3)	4–4 (a.e.t.) (3–5 p)	LASK (1)	Grödig
12:00	Wallner 16'; Dzidziguri 41'; Erdogan 69'; Strobl 93'	Report	Gartler 7'; Wiesinger 36'; Raguž 73'; Michorl 99'	Stadium: THE GOLDBERG Stadium; Attendance: 800; Referee: Alexander Harkam
	Penalties
	Strobl (penalty scored); Öttl (penalty scored); Omerovic (penalty scored); Erdogan (penalty missed)		Gartler (penalty scored); Michorl (penalty scored); Ullman (penalty scored); Raguž (penalty scored); Alan (penalty scored)

19 September 2017	Union St. Florian (3)	1–0	SC Weiz (3)	Saint Florian
12:00	Bytyci 84'	Report	Acai (yellow card) 30'; Djakovic (yellow card) 43'	Stadium: Sportpark St. Florian; Attendance: 120; Referee: Josef Spurny

19 September 2017	SKU Amstetten (3)	0–1	Wacker Innsbruck (2)	Amstetten
12:30	Madl (yellow card) 45+1'	Report	Jamnig 80'	Stadium: Ertl Glas Stadion; Attendance: 1,750; Referee: Robert Schörgenhofer

19 September 2017	SV Horn (2)	3–3 (a.e.t.) (3–4 p)	TSV Hartberg (2)	Horn
12:30	Milošević 34'; Paukner 64', 112' (yellow card) 90+2'; Park (yellow card) 66'; Krell (yellow card) 109'	Report	Gölles (yellow card) 31'; Tadić 63', 77', 110' (pen.); Rotter (yellow card) 82'	Stadium: Waldviertler Volksbank Arena; Attendance: 800; Referee: Gerhard Grobelnik
	Penalties
	Csandl (penalty scored); Paukner (penalty scored); Kawanaka (penalty scored); Havenaar (penalty missed); Milošević (penalty missed)		Gollner (penalty missed); Gremsl (penalty scored); Tadić (penalty scored); Fischer (penalty scored); Rasswalder (penalty scored)

20 September 2017	Anif (3)	1–2	Sturm Graz (1)	Grödig
11:00	Sorda 19'	Report	Lovrić (yellow card) 31'; Jeggo (yellow card) 73'; Zulechner 78', 90+4'	Stadium: THE GOLDBERG Stadium; Attendance: 1,123; Referee: Walter Altmann

20 September 2017	Union Vöcklamarkt (3)	0–3	Austria Wien (1)	Vöcklamarkt
11:30	Rensch (yellow card) 33'; Fröschl (yellow card) 37'	Report	Prokop 29' (yellow card) 65'; Ruan (yellow card) 58' (goal) 70'; Holzhauser 73' (pen.)	Stadium: Sportzentrum Union Volksbank Vöcklamarkt; Attendance: 2,050; Referee: Felix Ouschan

20 September 2017	Gurten (3)	3–4 (a.e.t.)	Rheindorf Altach (1)	Gurten
12:00	Schnaitter (yellow card) 13'; Zirnitzer 32'; Schott (yellow card) 56'; Tóth (yellow card) 66'; Hirsch (yellow card) 75'; Sakic 83' (o.g.); Grabovac 107'	Report	Grbić 15'; Sakic 62'; Gebauer 98'; Tekpetey 104' (red card) 105'	Stadium: Park21-Arena Gurten; Attendance: 900; Referee: Rene Eisner

20 September 2017	Elektra (4)	0–4	Rapid Wien (1)	Vienna
13:30	Halm (yellow card) 22'; Zisser (yellow card) 69'; Meznik (yellow card) 75'	Report	Kvilitaia 19' (yellow card) 35' (yellow-red card) 75'; Schaub 51', 76' (pen.); Soura 86' (o.g.)	Stadium: Sportclub-Platz; Attendance: 4,050; Referee: Julian Weinberger

21 September 2017	Bruck/Leitha (3)	1–3	Red Bull Salzburg (1)	Parndorf
12:00	Burusic 25'; Lechner (yellow card) 80'; Schöny (yellow card) 95'	Report	Gulbrandsen 20' (pen.); Wolf 107'; Daka 111'; Haidara (yellow card) 115'	Stadium: Heidebodenstadion; Attendance: 1,800; Referee: Chiristian-Petru Ciochirca

26 September 2017	Parndorf (3)	1–2	Mattersburg (1)	Parndorf
12:00	Jusits (yellow card) 18' (goal) 81' (pen.); Kircher (yellow card) 77'	Report	Jano 60'; Prevljak (yellow card) 68'; Malić 75'	Stadium: Heidebodenstadion; Attendance: 500; Referee: Alan Kijas

26 September 2017	Austria Klagenfurt (3)	3–0	Kapfenberger SV (2)	Klagenfurt am Wörthersee
12:00	Zakany 18'; Jaritz 39'; Filipović 44'; Žagar-Knez (yellow card) 73'	Report	Kainz (yellow card) 27'; Geissler (yellow card) 28'; Petrovcic (yellow card) 64'; Pesca (yellow card) 74'	Stadium: Wörthersee Stadion; Attendance: 124; Referee: Dieter Muckenhammer

26 September 2017	Bad Gleichenberg (3)	3–1	Admira Wacker Mödling (1)	Bad Gleichenberg
12:00	Wendler 62'; Krenn 75'; Degen 78'	Report	Kalajdžić 23'; Posch (yellow card) 51'; Maranda (yellow card) 60'	Stadium: Bad Gleichenberg Arena; Attendance: 1,300; Referee: Manuel Schüttengruber

== Third round ==
Third round matches were played 24–25 October 2017.

24 October 2017	Oedt (4)	0–3	Mattersburg (1)	Traun
08:00	Vujanović (yellow card) 36'	Report	Bürger 60'; Pink 61'; Okugawa 87'	Stadium: Transdanubia Sportanlage; Attendance: 600; Referee: Christian-Petru Ciochirca

24 October 2017	Union St. Florian (3)	0–4	TSV Hartberg (2)	Saint Florian
12:00	Winkler (yellow card) 38'; Pilz (yellow card) 65'	Report	Gremsl 10'; Fischer 44'; Tadić 54'; Holzer 88'	Stadium: Sportpark St. Florian; Attendance: 100; Referee: Walter Altmann

24 October 2017	SV Ried (2)	4–1	LASK (1)	Ried im Innkreis
12:12	Chabbi 11', 66', 72' (yellow card) 67'; Boateng 14'; Haring (red card) 55'; Fröschl (yellow card) 74'	Report	Ranftl (yellow card) 33'; Wiesinger (yellow card) 41' (yellow-red card) 63'; Goiginger (yellow card) 45+1'; Michorl (yellow card) 64'; Berisha 67'	Stadium: Keine Sorgen Arena; Attendance: 7,300; Referee: Christopher Jäger

25 October 2017	Bad Gleichenberg (3)	0–3	Red Bull Salzburg (1)	Bad Gleichenberg
12:00	Degen (yellow card) 40'; Trummer (yellow card) 73'	Report	Yabo 13' (yellow card) 45+1'; Onguéné 62'; Rzatkowski 85'; Ćaleta-Car (yellow card) 90'	Stadium: Bad Gleichenberg Arena; Attendance: 4,114; Referee: Dieter Muckenhammer

25 October 2017	Wimpassing (4)	1–0	Wolfsberger AC (1)	Wimpassing an der Leitha
11:30	Kouskous 72'; Topić (yellow card) 85'	Report	Frieser (yellow card) 13'	Stadium: Sportsplatz Wimpassing; Attendance: 400; Referee: Markus Hameter

25 October 2017	Austria Klagenfurt (3)	4–2	Wacker Innsbruck (2)	Klagenfurt am Wörthersee
13:00	Hupfauf 5' (o.g.); Soldo (yellow card) 32'; Hirschhofer 56'; Zakany 72'; Jaritz 90+2'	Report	Kerschbaum 24'; Dedič 30' (pen.) (yellow card) 40'	Stadium: Sportpark Klagenfurt; Attendance: 650; Referee: Manuel Schüttengruber

25 October 2017	Sturm Graz (1)	4–1	Rheindorf Altach (1)	Graz
11:00	Žulj 7' (pen.); Alar 20', 43'; Röcher 81'	Report	Tekpetey 25' (yellow card) 47'; Müller (yellow card) 45+1'; Netzer (yellow card) 48'; Aigner (yellow card) 69'; Dobras (yellow card) 70'; Gebauer (yellow card) 90+2'	Stadium: Merkur-Arena; Attendance: 6,774; Referee: Gerhard Grobelnik

25 October 2017	Austria Wien (1)	1–2	Rapid Wien (1)	Vienna
13:30	Alhassan 51'; Serbest (yellow card) 90+3'	Report	Sonnleitner (yellow card) 20'; Murg 41'; Schobesberger 78'; Schwab (yellow card) 84'	Stadium: Ernst Happel Stadion; Attendance: 14,652; Referee: Harald Lechner

== Quarter-finals ==
Quarter-final matches were played 27–28 February 2018.

27 February 2018	Mattersburg (1)	4–1	TSV Hartberg (2)	Mattersburg
12:30	Prevljak 13'; Malić (yellow card) 39'; Pink 44'; Okugawa 73', 75'	Report	Sanogo (yellow card) 78'; Meusburger 90'	Stadium: Pappelstadion; Attendance: 500; Referee: Christopher Jäger

28 February 2018	Rapid Wien (1)	2–1	SV Ried (2)	Hütteldorf, Vienna
13:30	Petsos (yellow card) 25'; Hofmann (yellow card) 45+1'; Joelinton 75' (pen.); Kvilitaia 77'	Report	Wießmeier 45+1' (pen.)	Stadium: Allianz Stadion; Attendance: 7,200; Referee: Markus Hameter

28 February 2018	Red Bull Salzburg (1)	7–0	Austria Klagenfurt (3)	Wals-Siezenheim, Salzburg
	Farkas 13'; Hwang Hee-chan 15', 37'; Haidara 24'; Gulbrandsen 69'; Wolf 71', 73'			Stadium: Red Bull Arena; Attendance: 1,536; Referee: Andreas Heiß

28 February 2018	Sturm Graz (1)	3–0	Wimpassing (4)	Graz, Styria
11:00	Huspek 2'; Žulj 47'; Edomwonyi (yellow card) 41'; Jantscher 70'	Report		Stadium: Merkur-Arena; Attendance: 2,811; Referee: Julian Weinberger

== Semi-finals ==
Semi-final matches were played 18 April 2018.

18 April 2018	Mattersburg (1)	0–0 (a.e.t.) (0–3 p)	Red Bull Salzburg (1)	Mattersburg
11:00	Haidara (yellow card) 27'; Berisha (yellow card) 82'	Report	Höller (yellow card) 40'; Renner (yellow card) 84'; Novak (yellow card) 89'	Stadium: Pappelstadion; Attendance: 4,800; Referee: Manuel Schüttengruber
	Penalties
	Höller (penalty missed); Malić (penalty missed); Seidl (penalty missed)		(penalty scored) Berisha; (penalty scored) Ramalho; (penalty scored) Lainer

18 April 2018	Sturm Graz (1)	3–2 (a.e.t.)	Rapid Wien (1)	Graz, Styria
	Edomwonyi 24', 62' (yellow card) 25'; Röcher (yellow card) 33'; Hierländer (yellow card) 57'; Žulj (yellow card) 77'; Eze 102'	Report	Schwab (yellow card) 38'; Schaub 58'; Kvilitaia 84'; Hofmann (yellow card) 109' (yellow-red card) 120+2'	Stadium: Merkur-Arena; Attendance: 15,750; Referee: Robert Schörgenhofer

== Final ==
9 May 2018
13:30

Sturm Graz	1–0 (a.e.t.)	Red Bull Salzburg
Hierländer 112'	Report

Wörthersee Stadion, Klagenfurt
Attendance: 27,100
Referee: Harald Lechner

== See also ==
- 2017–18 Austrian Football Bundesliga
