= 2018 Austrian Cup final =

- Event: 2017–18 Austrian Cup
Sturm Graz	Red Bull Salzburg
1	0
- Date: 9 May 2018
- Venue: Wörthersee Stadion, Klagenfurt
- Referee: Harald Lechner
- Attendance: 27,100
- Weather: Clear; 15 °C (59 °F); 80% humidity

The 2018 Austrian Cup final was played on 9 May 2018 between SK Sturm Graz and FC Red Bull Salzburg at Wörthersee Stadion, Klagenfurt, a neutral ground. The final was the culmination of the 2017–18 Austrian Cup, the 84th season of the Austrian Cup.

Sturm Graz won their fifth cup title after defeating Red Bull Salzburg 1–0 after extra time, which would have earned them a place in the second qualifying round of the 2018–19 UEFA Europa League, but they instead qualified for the UEFA Champions League by virtue of their second place finish in the 2017–18 Austrian Bundesliga.

== Teams ==
Team	Previous finals appearances (bold indicates winners)
SK Sturm Graz	9 (1948, 1974–75, **1996**, **1997**, 1998, **1999**, 2002, **2010,** **2018**)
FC Red Bull Salzburg	10 (1974, 1980, 1981, 2000, **2012**, **2014**, **2015,** **2016,** **2017,** 2018)

== Venue ==
Wörthersee Stadion is the home of SK Austria Klagenfurt and opened in 2007. It has a capacity of 32,000 spectators and is part of Sportpark Klagenfurt.

== Background ==
The Austrian Bundesliga clubs SK Sturm Graz and FC Red Bull Salzburg contested the final, with the winner earning a place in the second qualifying round of the 2018–19 UEFA Europa League. Since Sturm Graz qualified for the second qualifying round of the 2018–19 UEFA Champions League by virtue of its second place finish in the 2017–18 Austrian Bundesliga, Austria's last European place is given to FC Admira Wacker Mödling as the 5th place team of the 2017-18 Austrian Bundesliga.

Sturm Graz competed in its ninth overall final, their first since 2010. Red Bull Salzburg made its fifth straight finals appearance (sixth in seven seasons and its 10th overall. Both clubs now have five total Austrian Cup championships. The two teams had never previously met in an Austrian Cup final, and Red Bull Salzburg won three of the four meetings during the regular season of the 2017-18 Austrian Football Bundesliga, outscoring Sturm Graz 13-5 over those four contests.

== Route to the final ==
Note: In all results below, the score of the finalist is given first (H: home; A: away).

SK Sturm Graz		Round	FC Red Bull Salzburg	
Opponent	Result		Opponent	Result
FC Hard	3–0 (A)	First round	Deutschlandsberger	7–0 (A)
FC Liefering	3–2 (A)	Second round	Bruck/Leitha	2–1 (A)
SC Rheindorf Altach	4–1 (H)	Third round	Bad Gleichenberg	3–0 (A)
Wimpassing	3–0 (H)	Quarter-finals	SK Austria Klagenfurt	7–0 (H)
SK Rapid Wien	3–2 (a.e.t.) (H)	Semi-finals	SV Mattersburg	0–0 (a.e.t.) (H) (3–0 p)

== Match ==
=== Details ===
9 May 2018
13:30

Sturm Graz	1–0 (a.e.t.)	Red Bull Salzburg
Hierländer 112'	Report

Wörthersee Stadion, Klagenfurt
Attendance: 27,100
Referee: Harald Lechner

GK	27	(Austria) Jörg Siebenhandl
DF	26	(Austria) Fabian Koch	(yellow card) 45+2'
DF	19	(Austria) Marvin Potzmann	(yellow card) 118'
DF	23	(Austria) Lukas Spendlhofer
DF	35	(Austria) Dario Maresic
MF	25	(Austria) Stefan Hierländer
MF	17	(Austria) Peter Žulj	(substituted off) 120+2'	(yellow card) 41'
MF	29	(Austria) Thorsten Röcher	(substituted off) 102'	(yellow card) 35'
MF	6	(Australia) James Jeggo
FW	9	(Austria) Deni Alar	(substituted off) 118'	(yellow card) 18'
FW	20	(Nigeria) Bright Edomwonyi	(substituted off) 93'
Substitutes:
GK	32	(Austria) Tobias Schützenauer
DF	4	(Austria) Thomas Schrammel
DF	5	(Dominican Republic) Christian Schoissengeyr	(substituted on) 120+2'
MF	8	(Austria) Sandi Lovrić	(substituted on) 118'
MF	13	(Austria) Jakob Jantscher	(substituted on) 93'	(yellow card) 102'
MF	18	(Austria) Philipp Huspek	(substituted on) 102'
DF	20	(Germany) Christian Schulz
Manager:
(Germany) Heiko Vogel

GK	1	(Austria) Cican Stankovic	(yellow card) 120+4'
DF	25	(Austria) Patrick Farkas
DF	22	(Austria) Stefan Lainer
DF	15	(Brazil) André Ramalho	(yellow card) 62' (yellow-red card) 71'
DF	5	(Croatia) Duje Ćaleta-Car	(substituted off) 46'	(yellow card) 17'
MF	7	(Germany) Reinhold Yabo	(substituted off) 99'
MF	14	(Kosovo) Valon Berisha (c)	(yellow card) 18'
MF	42	(Austria) Xaver Schlager
DF	8	(Mali) Diadie Samassékou
FW	21	(Norway) Fredrik Gulbrandsen	(substituted off) 76'
FW	9	(Israel) Mu'nas Dabbur	(substituted off) 83'
Substitutes:
GK	33	(Germany) Alexander Walke
MF	4	(Mali) Amadou Haidara	(substituted on) 76'	(yellow card) 120'
DF	6	(France) Jérôme Onguéné	(substituted on) 46'
MF	13	(Austria) Hannes Wolf	(substituted on) 99'
FW	18	(Japan) Takumi Minamino
FW	19	(South Korea) Hwang Hee-chan	(substituted on) 83'	(yellow card) 107'
MF	24	(Austria) Christoph Leitgeb
Manager:
(Germany) Marco Rose

Assistant referees:
Andreas Heidenreich
Maximilian Kolbitsch

Fourth official:
Gerhard Grobelnik

**Match rules**

- 90 minutes
- 30 minutes of extra time if necessary
- Penalty shoot-out if scores still level
- Seven named substitutes, of which up to four may be used
