= 2019–20 Austrian Football Second League =

Austrian Football Second League
- Season: 2019–20

The 2019–20 Austrian Football Second League is the 46th season of the Austrian second-level football league and the second one as the Second League. The league contains 16 teams with one team being promoted to the Austrian Football Bundesliga and 3 teams being relegated to the Austrian Regionalliga.

== Teams ==
Sixteen teams will participate in the 2019–20 season. Promoted teams are Grazer AK from Austrian Regionalliga Central and FC Dornbirn 1913 from Austrian Regionalliga West. No team gained promotion from Austrian Regionalliga East due to the only team to apply for a licence (SK Rapid Wien II) not attaining the required second place.

The team relegated from the 2018–19 Austrian Football Bundesliga were Wacker Innsbruck.

Location of teams in the 2019–20 Austrian Football First League

Club Name	City	Stadium	Capacity
Austria Lustenau	Lustenau	Reichshofstadion	8,800
FC Blau-Weiß Linz	Linz	Donauparkstadion	2,000
Floridsdorfer AC	Vienna	FAC-Platz	3,000
FK Austria Wien II	Vienna	Austria-Akademie	830
Kapfenberger SV	Kapfenberg	Franz-Fekete-Stadion	12,000
Liefering	Salzburg	Red Bull Arena	31,895
SV Ried	Ried im Innkreis	Keine Sorgen Arena	7,680
FC Wacker Innsbruck (2002)	Innsbruck	Tivoli-Neu	16,000
Grazer AK	Graz	Merkur-Arena	15,323
FC Dornbirn 1913	Dornbirn	Stadion Birkenwiese	12,000
FC Juniors OÖ	Pasching	Waldstadion	7,870
SV Horn	Horn	Waldviertler Volksbank Arena	7,870
SKU Amstetten	Amstetten	Ertl Glas Stadion	2,000
SV Lafnitz	Lafnitz	Sportplatz Lafnitz	3,000
SK Vorwärts Steyr	Steyr	Vorwärts-Stadion	6,000
SK Austria Klagenfurt	Klagenfurt	Wörthersee Stadion	32,000

=== Personnel and kits ===
Club	Manager	Captain	Kit Manufacturer	Sponsors
Austria Lustenau	(Austria) Gernot Plassnegger	Ronivaldo	Uhlsport	Planet Pure
FC Blau-Weiß Linz	(Austria) Thomas Sageder	Bernhard Janeczek	Uhlsport	Linz AG
Floridsdorfer	(Austria) Mario Handl	Marco Sahanek	Puma	Wiener Stadtische/Wien Energie
FK Austria Wien II	(Austria) Andreas Ogris	Stefan Jonovic	Nike	Gazprom Export
Kapfenberger SV	(Austria) Kurt Russ	David Sencar	Erima	Murauer
Liefering	(Denmark) Bo Svensson	Daniel Antosch	Nike	Red Bull
SV Ried	(Austria) Thomas Weissenböck	Thomas Reifeltshammer	Hummel	Guntamatic
Wacker Innsbruck	(Austria) Thomas Grumser	Lukas Hupfauf	Macron	
Grazer AK	(Austria) David Preiß	Marco Perchtold	Erima	Hpybet
FC Dornbirn	(Austria) Markus Mader	Aaron Kircher	Erima	Mohren
FC Juniors OÖ	(Austria) Ronald Brunmayr	Nemanja Celic		
SV Horn	(Germany) Carsten Jancker	Marcel Toth	Macron	Leyrer + Graf
SKU Amstetten	(Austria) Robert Weinstabl	Matthias Wurm	Puma	Ertl Glas
SV Lafnitz	(Austria) Ferdinand Feldhofer	Andreas Zingl	adidas	Autohaus Frieszl
SK Vorwärts Steyr	(Austria) Wilhelm Wahlmüller	Reinhard Großalber	Erima	Falcoon
SK Austria Klagenfurt	(Austria) Robert Micheu	Sandro Zakany	Erreà	

== Managerial changes ==
Team	Outgoing manager	Date of vacancy	Incoming manager	Date of appointment
SV Horn	(Austria) Kurt Jusits	17 June 2019	(Austria) Markus Karner	18 June 2019
FC Liefering	(Poland) Janusz Góra	30 June 2019	(Germany) Michael Feichtenbeiner (caretaker manager)	1 July 2019
FC Juniors OÖ	(Austria) Andreas Wieland	30 June 2019	(Austria) Gerald Scheiblehner	1 July 2019
Grazer AK	(Austria) Enrico Kulovits	30 June 2019	(Austria) David Preiß	1 July 2019
FK Austria Wien II	(Austria) Christoph Glatzer	30 June 2019	(Austria) Harald Suchard	1 July 2019
FC Liefering	(Germany) Michael Feichtenbeiner (caretaker manager)	12 July 2019	(Denmark) Bo Svensson	12 July 2019
SC Austria Lustenau	(Austria) Gernot Plassnegger	4 September 2019	(Austria) Tamás Tiefenbach (caretaker manager)	4 September 2019
SC Austria Lustenau	(Austria) Tamás Tiefenbach (caretaker manager)	15 September 2019	(Austria) Roman Mählich	16 September 2019
SV Horn	(Austria) Markus Karner	11 November 2019	(Austria) Hans Kleer	11 November 2019
FC Blau-Weiß Linz	(Austria) Goran Djuricin	6 December 2019	(Austria) Ronald Brunmayr	14 January 2020
SV Lafnitz	(Austria) Ferdinand Feldhofer	23 December 2019	(Austria) Philipp Semlic	3 January 2020
Grazer AK	(Austria) David Preiß	25 February 2020	(Austria) Alois Hödl	25 February 2020

== League table ==
Pos	Team	Pld	W	D	L	GF	GA	GD	Pts	Promotion
1	SV Ried (C)	30	20	4	6	73	39	+34	64	Promotion to 2020–21 Austrian Bundesliga
2	Austria Klagenfurt	30	19	7	4	65	36	+29	64	
3	FC Liefering	30	15	8	7	73	47	+26	53	
4	Austria Wien II	30	14	6	10	62	44	+18	48	
5	SKU Amstetten	30	12	9	9	51	47	+4	45	
6	Wacker Innsbruck	30	13	5	12	44	49	−5	44	
7	Vorwärts Steyr	30	11	8	11	42	36	+6	41	
8	SV Lafnitz	30	9	12	9	42	42	0	39	
9	Blau-Weiß Linz	30	10	7	13	51	57	−6	37	
10	FC Juniors OÖ	29	10	7	12	48	61	−13	37	
11	Austria Lustenau	30	10	5	15	57	58	−1	35	
12	FC Dornbirn 1913	30	8	10	12	40	59	−19	34	
13	SV Horn	30	8	8	14	58	67	−9	32	
14	Floridsdorfer AC	30	7	11	12	32	51	−19	32	Reprieved from Relegation to 2020–21 Austrian Regionalliga
15	Grazer AK	30	7	10	13	40	50	−10	31	Reprieved from Relegation to 2020–21 Austrian Regionalliga
16	Kapfenberger SV	29	6	3	20	32	67	−35	21	Reprieved from Relegation to 2020–21 Austrian Regionalliga

Source: 2.Liga Table
Rules for classification: 1) Points; 2) Goal difference; 3) Goals scored; 4) Matches won; 5) Away matches won; 6) Head-to-head points; 7) Head-to-head goal difference; 8) Head-to-head goals scored.
(C) Champions

== Season statistics ==
=== Top goalscorers ===
As of 26 February 2020

Rank	Player	Club	Goals
1	(Brazil) Ronivaldo	Austria Lustenau	15
2	(Austria) Ercan Kara	SV Horn	13
3	(Austria) Fabian Schubert	Blau-Weiß Linz	9
4	(Germany) Karim Adeyemi	FC Liefering	8
4	(Spain) Jefté Betancor	SV Ried	8
4	(Austria) Chukwubuike Adamu	FC Liefering	8

== See also ==
- 2019–20 Austrian Football Bundesliga
- 2019–20 Austrian Cup
