= 2019 Austrian Cup final =

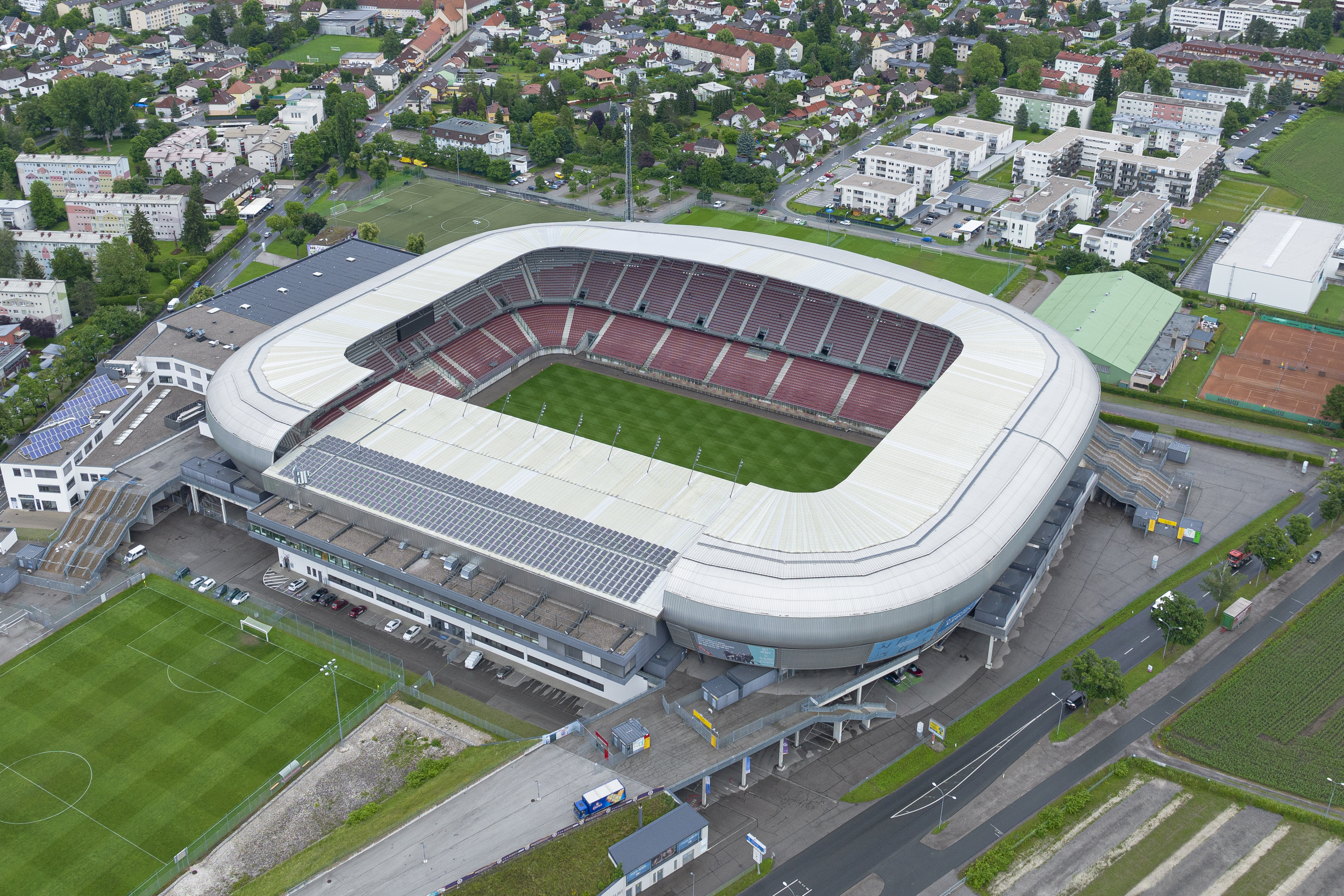
- Wörthersee Stadion hosted the final.
- Event: 2018–19 Austrian Cup
Red Bull Salzburg	Rapid Wien
2	0
- Date: 1 May 2019
- Venue: Wörthersee Stadion, Klagenfurt
- Referee: Manuel Schüttengruber
- Attendance: 24,200
- Weather: Clear; 66 °F (19 °C); 26% humidity

The 2019 Austrian Cup final was played on 1 May 2019 between FC Red Bull Salzburg and SK Rapid Wien at Wörthersee Stadion, Klagenfurt, a neutral ground. The final was the culmination of the 2018–19 Austrian Cup, the 88th season of the Austrian Cup.

Red Bull Salzburg won their sixth cup title after defeating Rapid Wien 2–0, which would have earned them a place in the 2019–20 UEFA Europa League, but they instead qualified for the UEFA Champions League by virtue of their first-place finish in the 2018–19 Austrian Bundesliga.

== Teams ==
Team	Previous finals appearances (bold indicates winners)
SK Rapid Wien	28 (**1919**, **1920**, **1927**, 1929, 1934, 1946, 1959, 1960, **1961**, 1966, **1968**, **1969**, 1971, **1972**, 1973, **1983**, **1984**, **1985**, 1986, **1987**, 1990, 1991, 1993, **1995**, 2005, 2017, 2019)
FC Red Bull Salzburg	11 (1974 (Note: As SV Austria Salzburg), 1980, 1981, 2000, **2012**, **2014**, **2015,** **2016,** **2017,** 2018, **2019**)

== Venue ==
Wörthersee Stadion is the home of SK Austria Klagenfurt, an Austrian Football Bundesliga club.

== Background ==
The Austrian Bundesliga clubs FC Red Bull Salzburg and SK Rapid Wien contested the final, with the winner earning a place in the 2019–20 UEFA Europa League. Since Red Bull Salzburg qualified for the 2019–20 UEFA Champions League by virtue of their second-place finish in the 2018–19 Austrian Bundesliga, the Europa League group stage place passed down the table to Wolfsberger AC as they finished 3rd in the table.

Red Bull Salzburg competed in its eleventh overall final, which was also their sixth consecutive final. Rapid Wien competed in their twenty-eighth overall final, which was their first since 2017. Rapid Wien have won the domestic cup twelve times in their history, while Red Bull Salzburg have only won it 5 times. The two teams met in the 2016–17 Austrian Cup final, with Red Bull Salzburg winning 2–1. Both teams won against each other in the 2018–19 Austrian Football Bundesliga regular season, with Rapid Wien outscoring Red Bull Salzburg 3–2 over 2 matches.

== Route to the final ==
Note: In all results below, the score of the finalist is given first (H: home; A: away).

FC Red Bull Salzburg		Round	SK Rapid Wien	
Opponent	Result		Opponent	Result
Oedt	6–0 (A)	First round	Kufstein	5–0 (A)
Schwaz	6–0 (A)	Second round	SV Mattersburg	1–1 (a.e.t.) (A) (5–4 p)
Austria Lustenau	1–0 (A)	Third round	Wolfsberger AC	3–0 (A)
Wiener Neustadt	2–1 (A)	Quarter-finals	TSV Hartberg	5–2 (H)
Grazer AK	6–0 (A)	Semi-finals	LASK	1–1 (a.e.t.) (A) (4–3 p)

== Match ==
1 May 2019
17:30

Red Bull Salzburg	2–0	Rapid Wien
Farkas 37'; Dabbur 39'	Report

Wörthersee Stadion, Klagenfurt
Attendance: 24,200
Referee: Manuel Schüttengruber

GK	1	(Austria) Alexander Walke (c)	(yellow card) 90+2'
RB	22	(Austria) Stefan Lainer
CB	6	(Cameroon) Jérôme Onguéné
CB	15	(Brazil) André Ramalho
LB	25	(Austria) Patrick Farkas		(yellow card) 45+2' (yellow-red card) 83'
MF	42	(Austria) Xaver Schlager
MF	8	(Mali) Diadie Samassékou
MF	16	(Austria) Zlatko Junuzovic	(substituted off) 72'
MF	13	(Austria) Hannes Wolf	(substituted off) 67'
FW	9	(Israel) Mu'nas Dabbur		(yellow card) 90+5'
FW	21	(Norway) Fredrik Gulbrandsen	(substituted off) 76'	(yellow card) 74'
Substitutes:
GK	1	(Austria) Cican Stankovic
CB	5	(Austria) Albert Vallci
FW	11	(Bosnia and Herzegovina) Smail Prevljak
MF	14	(Hungary) Dominik Szoboszlai	(substituted on) 72'
MF	18	(Japan) Takumi Minamino	(substituted on) 67'
FW	20	(Zambia) Patson Daka	(substituted on) 76'
CM	45	(Zambia) Enock Mwepu
Manager:
(Germany) Marco Rose

GK	1	(Austria) Richard Strebinger
RB	3	(Turkey) Mert Müldür	(yellow card) 61'
CB	20	(Austria) Maximilian Hofmann	(yellow card) 90+5'
CB	6	(Austria) Mario Sonnleitner	(substituted off) 86'
LB	5	(Belgium) Boli Bolingoli
MF	14	(Bosnia and Herzegovina) Srdjan Grahovac
MF	39	(Austria) Dejan Ljubicic	(substituted off) 64'
MF	8	(Austria) Stefan Schwab (c)
RW	10	(Austria) Thomas Murg
FW	22	(Serbia) Andrija Pavlovic	(substituted off) 70'
LW	7	(Austria) Philipp Schobesberger
Substitutes:
CB	17	(Austria) Christopher Dibon
LB	19	(Austria) Marvin Potzmann
GK	21	(Austria) Tobias Knoflach
RB	24	(Austria) Stephan Auer
FW	27	(Senegal) Aliou Badji	(substituted on) 70'
MF	28	(Austria) Christoph Knasmüllner	(substituted on) 64'
GK	97	(Romania) Andrei Ivan	(substituted on) 86'
Manager:
(Austria) Dietmar Kühbauer

**Match rules**

- 90 minutes.
- 30 minutes of extra time if necessary.
- Penalty shoot-out if scores still level.
- Seven named substitutes, of which up to four may be used.
