= Huspek =

Huspek is a surname. Notable people with the surname include:

- Felix Huspek (born 1992), Austrian footballer
- Philipp Huspek (born 1991), Austrian footballer
