= Zakany (surname) =

Zakany is a surname. Notable people with the surname include:

- Bertalan Zakany (born 1984), Hungarian figure skater
- Sandro Zakany (born 1987), Austrian footballer
