= Dario Tadić =

Austrian footballer (born 1990)

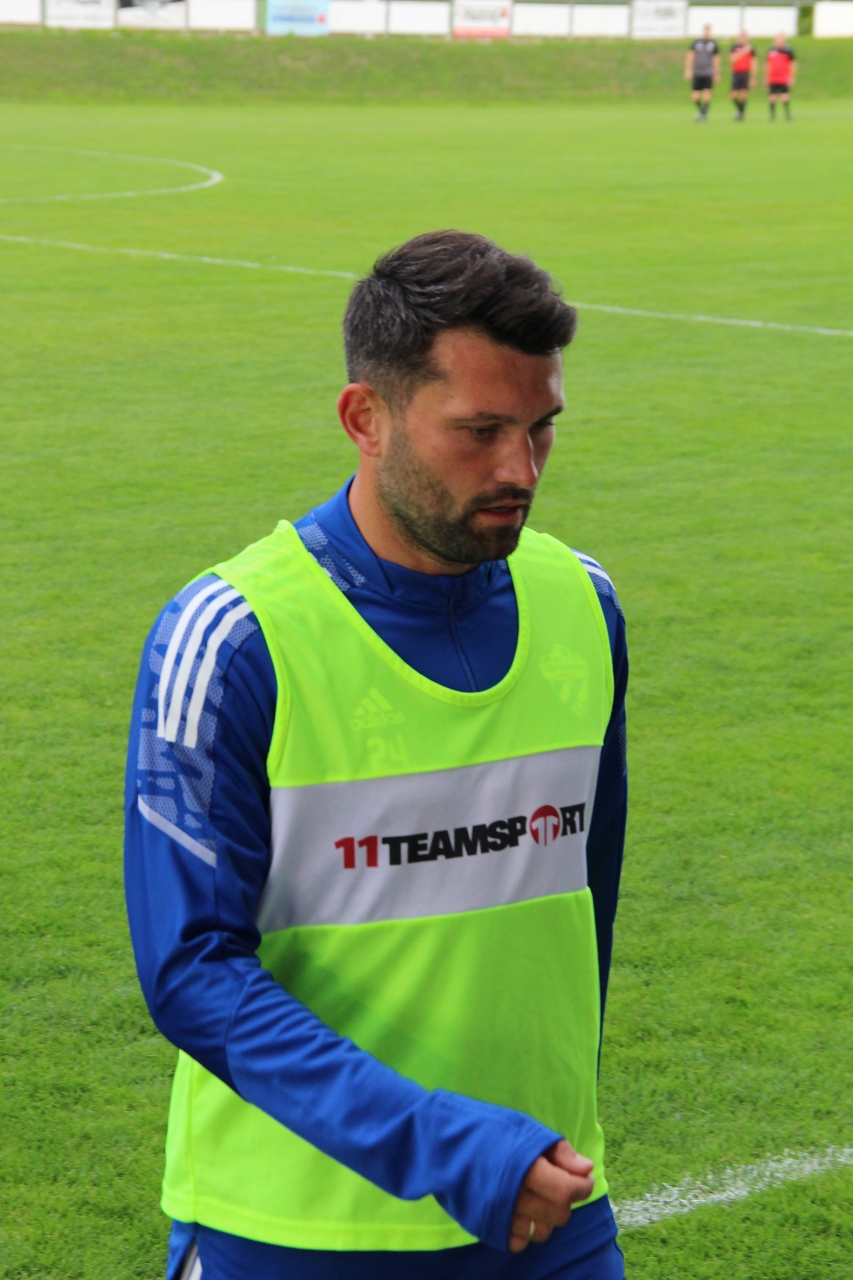
- Tadić in 2021

Personal information
- Date of birth: 11 May 1990 (age 36)
- Place of birth: Odžak, SFR Yugoslavia
- Height: 1.79 m (5 ft 10 in)
- Position: Forward

Team information
- Current team: SKN St. Pölten
- Number: 24

Youth career
- –2003: SC Pinkafeld Jugend
- 2003–2004: AKA Burgenland U18
- 2004–2010: AKA Austria Wien U18

Senior career*
Years	Team	Apps	(Gls)
2010–2012	Austria Wien	29	(10)
2012–2013	Wiener Neustadt	27	(11)
2014–2015	Austria Lustenau	52	(13)
2015–2023	Hartberg	241	(112)
2023–	SKN St. Pölten	32	(16)

International career
2009	Austria U19	1	(0)
2010–2012	Austria U21	14	(1)
- * Club domestic league appearances and goals as of 27 December 2024

Dario Tadić (born 11 May 1990) is an Austrian professional footballer who plays as a forward for SKN St. Pölten.

Born in Odžak, SR Bosnia and Herzegovina, SFR Yugoslavia, he decided to play for the Austrian U19 team.

== Honours ==
=== Individual ===
- Austrian Cup Top goalscorer: 2017–18
