= Sandi Lovrić =

Austrian-Slovenian footballer (born 1998)

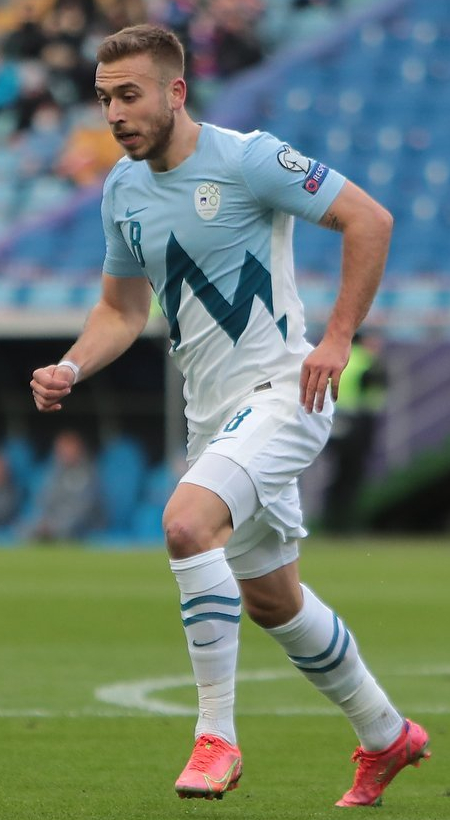
- Lovrić with Slovenia in 2021

Personal information
- Date of birth: 28 March 1998 (age 28)
- Place of birth: Lienz, Austria
- Height: 1.80 m (5 ft 11 in)
- Position: Midfielder

Team information
- Current team: Udinese
- Number: 4

Youth career
- 2002–2008: SV Rapid Lienz
- 2008–2009: FC Nußdorf/Debant
- 2009–2012: SV Rapid Lienz
- 2012–2014: Sturm Graz

Senior career*
Years	Team	Apps	(Gls)
2014–2019	Sturm Graz	64	(1)
2014–2017	Sturm Graz II	31	(4)
2019–2022	Lugano	93	(9)
2022–	Udinese	109	(8)
2026	→ Hellas Verona (loan)	8	(0)

International career^{‡}
2013–2014	Austria U16	10	(6)
2014–2015	Austria U17	10	(5)
2015	Austria U18	3	(1)
2016–2017	Austria U19	13	(3)
2017–2019	Austria U21	19	(4)
2020–	Slovenia	50	(6)
- * Club domestic league appearances and goals as of 29 September 2026 ‡ National team caps and goals as of 16 November 2026

Sandi Lovrić (born 28 March 1998) is a professional footballer who plays as a midfielder for Serie A club Udinese. Born in Austria, he plays for the Slovenia national team.

== Club career ==
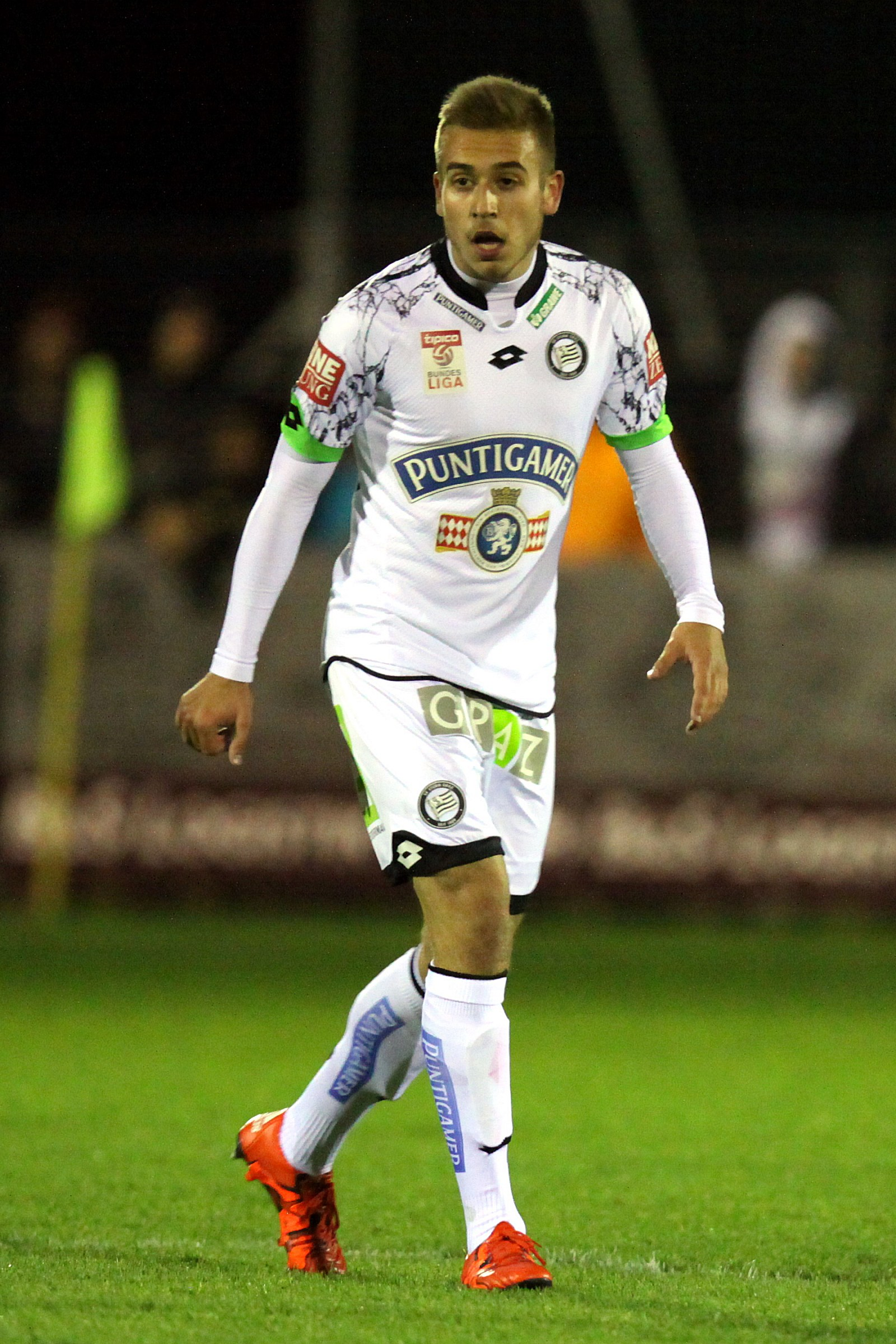
Lovrić playing for Sturm Graz in 2015

Lovrić joined Sturm Graz in 2012 from SV Rapid Lienz. He made his league debut on 17 August 2014 in a 1–1 home draw against Austria Wien by coming on as a substitute for Marko Stanković. On 9 May 2018, he won the Austrian Cup with Sturm after defeating Red Bull Salzburg 1–0 in the final.

On 3 July 2019, Lovrić signed a three-year deal with Swiss side Lugano after he decided to not extend his contract with Sturm Graz.

On 28 March 2022, he signed a five-year contract with Serie A side Udinese.

On 30 January 2026, Lovrić moved on loan to Hellas Verona until the end of the 2025–26 season.

== International career ==
Eligible to represent Austria, Croatia, Bosnia and Herzegovina and Slovenia internationally, Lovrić represented Austria in all youth selections from under-16 to under-21, making over 50 appearances between 2013 and 2019. He stated that he was never approached by anyone from the Croatian Football Federation.

In September 2020, he decided to represent Slovenia at senior level after being approached by their coach Matjaž Kek. He debuted for Slovenia on 7 October 2020 in a friendly game against San Marino, playing for 59 minutes before being substituted by Benjamin Verbič.

On 14 October 2020, Lovrić scored his first goal in a 4–0 UEFA Nations League victory over Moldova. On 24 March 2021, he scored his second goal, the only goal in the 1–0 World Cup qualifying victory over his fatherland Croatia. The upset victory was notably Slovenia's first victory over Croatia in history.

== Personal life ==
Lovrić's parents are of Croatian descent. His father hails from Slavonski Brod and his mother is a Bosnian Croat from Modriča. They moved to Piran, Slovenia as migrant workers, and later to Austria, where Lovrić was born. Alongside German, he also fluently speaks Croatian and Italian.

As a youngster, Lovrić often spent summer vacations in Slovenia, and cited his connection to the country as the main reason to represent the Slovenia national team.

Lovrić named Luka Modrić as his football idol.

== Career statistics ==
=== Club ===
As of match played 18 May 2025

Appearances and goals by club, season and competition
Club	Season	League			National cup		Continental		Total	
Club	Season	Division	Apps	Goals	Apps	Goals	Apps	Goals	Apps	Goals
Sturm Graz II	2014–15	Regionalliga Mitte	9	3	—		—		9	3
Sturm Graz II	2015–16	Regionalliga Mitte	8	1	—		—		8	1
Sturm Graz II	2016–17	Regionalliga Mitte	14	0	—		—		14	0
Sturm Graz II	Total		31	4	0	0	0	0	31	4
Sturm Graz	2014–15	Austrian Bundesliga	8	0	0	0	—		8	0
Sturm Graz	2015–16	Austrian Bundesliga	8	0	2	0	0	0	10	0
Sturm Graz	2016–17	Austrian Bundesliga	3	0	1	0	—		4	0
Sturm Graz	2017–18	Austrian Bundesliga	25	0	4	0	3 (Note: Appearances in UEFA Europa League)	0	32	0
Sturm Graz	2018–19	Austrian Bundesliga	20	1	1	0	4 (Note: Two appearances in UEFA Champions League, two appearances in UEFA Europa League)	0	25	1
Sturm Graz	Total		64	1	8	0	7	0	79	1
Lugano	2019–20	Swiss Super League	27	3	2	0	5	0	34	3
Lugano	2020–21	Swiss Super League	33	2	2	2	—		35	4
Lugano	2021–22	Swiss Super League	33	4	6	1	—		39	5
Lugano	Total		93	9	10	3	5	0	108	12
Udinese	2022–23	Serie A	37	5	2	0	—		39	5
Udinese	2023–24	Serie A	29	1	2	1	—		31	2
Udinese	2024–25	Serie A	36	2	2	0	—		38	2
Udinese	Total		102	8	6	1	0	0	108	9
Career total			290	22	24	4	12	0	326	26

=== International ===
As of match played 16 November 2026

Appearances and goals by national team and year
National team	Year	Apps	Goals
Slovenia
Slovenia	2020	6	1
Slovenia	2021	12	2
Slovenia	2022	7	0
Slovenia	2023	7	1
Slovenia	2024	6	0
Slovenia	2025	6	1
Slovenia	2026	6	1
Total		50	6

Scores and results list Slovenia's goal tally first, score column indicates score after each Lovrić goal.

List of international goals scored by Sandi Lovrić
No.	Date	Venue	Cap	Opponent	Score	Result	Competition
1	14 October 2020	Zimbru Stadium, Chișinău, Moldova	3	Moldova	1–0	4–0	2020–21 UEFA Nations League C
2	24 March 2021	Stožice Stadium, Ljubljana, Slovenia	7	Croatia	1–0	1–0	2022 FIFA World Cup qualification
3	4 September 2021	Stožice Stadium, Ljubljana, Slovenia	13	Malta	1–0	1–0	2022 FIFA World Cup qualification
4	10 September 2023	San Marino Stadium, Serravalle, San Marino	30	San Marino	3–0	4–0	UEFA Euro 2024 qualifying
5	5 September 2025	Stožice Stadium, Ljubljana, Slovenia	43	Sweden	1–1	2–2	2026 FIFA World Cup qualification
6	29 September 2026	Stožice Stadium, Ljubljana, Slovenia	48	North Macedonia	1–0	2–0	2026–27 UEFA Nations League B

== Honours ==
Sturm Graz

- Austrian Cup: 2017–18

Lugano

- Swiss Cup: 2021–22
