= Jörg Siebenhandl =

Austrian footballer

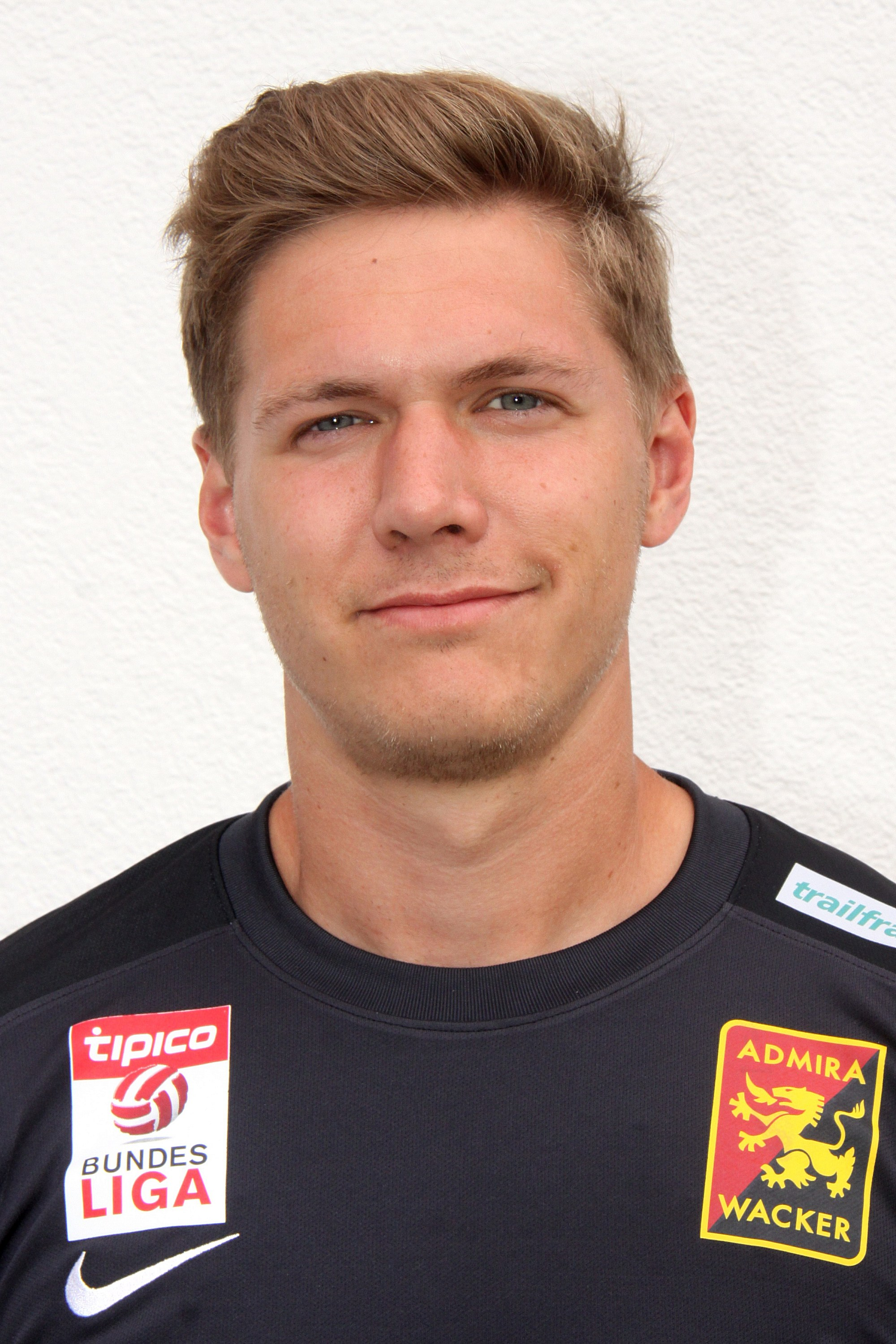
- Siebenhandl with Admira Wacker in 2015

Personal information
- Date of birth: 18 January 1990 (age 36)
- Place of birth: Vienna, Austria
- Height: 1.84 m (6 ft 0 in)
- Position: Goalkeeper

Team information
- Current team: Admira Wacker
- Number: 27

Youth career
- 1996–1999: Admira Wacker
- 1999–2007: Austria Wien

Senior career*
Years	Team	Apps	(Gls)
2007–2009	Austria Wien	0	(0)
2008	→ SV Wienerberg (loan)	2	(0)
2010–2014	SC Wiener Neustadt	73	(1)
2010–2011	→ SC Columbia (loan)	30	(0)
2014–2016	Admira Wacker	49	(0)
2016–2017	Würzburger Kickers	10	(0)
2017–2023	Sturm Graz	179	(0)
2023–2025	LASK	11	(0)
2025–	Admira Wacker	28	(0)

International career^{‡}
2011–2012	Austria U21	6	(0)
2018–	Austria	2	(0)
- * Club domestic league appearances and goals as of 17 May 2026 ‡ National team caps and goals as of 2 June 2018

Jörg Siebenhandl (born 18 January 1990) is an Austrian professional footballer who plays as a goalkeeper for 2. Liga club Admira Wacker and the Austria national team.

== Club career ==
After his contract with SC Wiener Neustadt had expired in summer 2014, Siebenhandl was without a club until he rejoined his first youth club Admira Wacker in November 2014. He signed a contract until 2017 and served as an emergency man for injured regular goalkeeper Andreas Leitner. In the summer of 2016 he moved to German 2. Bundesliga club Würzburger Kickers. Siebenhandl made his debut for his new side in a DFB-Pokal defeat to 1860 Munich on 25 October 2016.

On 9 May 2018, Siebenhandl played as Sturm Graz beat Red Bull Salzburg in extra time to win the 2017–18 Austrian Cup.

In June 2023, Siebenhandl signed for LASK on a three-year deal.

On 28 January 2025, Siebenhandl returned to Admira Wacker.

== International career ==
He made a debut for the Austria national football team on 27 March 2018 in a 4–0 win against Luxembourg.

== Career statistics ==
As of match played 28 November 2024

Appearances and goals by club, season and competition
Club	Season	League			National cup		Europe		Total	
Club	Season	Division	Apps	Goals	Apps	Goals	Apps	Goals	Apps	Goals
Austria Wien	2007–08	Austrian Bundesliga	0	0	0	0	0	0	0	0
SV Wienerberg (loan)	2008–09	Austrian Regionalliga East	2	0	–		–		2	0
SC Wiener Neustadt	2010–11	Austrian Bundesliga	1	0	–		–		1	0
SC Wiener Neustadt	2011–12	Austrian Bundesliga	34	1	0	0	–		34	1
SC Wiener Neustadt	2012–13	Austrian Bundesliga	28	0	1	0	–		29	0
SC Wiener Neustadt	2013–14	Austrian Bundesliga	10	0	1	0	–		11	0
SC Wiener Neustadt	Total		73	1	2	0	–		75	1
Admira Wacker	2014–15	Austrian Bundesliga	14	0	0	0	–		14	0
Admira Wacker	2015–16	Austrian Bundesliga	35	0	3	0	–		38	0
Admira Wacker	2016–17	Austrian Bundesliga	1	0	0	0	4 (Note: Appearances in UEFA Europa League)	0	5	0
Admira Wacker	Total		50	0	3	0	4	0	57	0
Würzburger Kickers	2016–17	2. Bundesliga	10	0	2	0	–		12	0
Sturm Graz	2017–18	Austrian Bundesliga	35	0	4	0	4	0	43	0
Sturm Graz	2018–19	Austrian Bundesliga	33	0	2	0	3 (Note: One appearance in UEFA Champions League, two appearances in UEFA Europa League)	0	38	0
Sturm Graz	2019–20	Austrian Bundesliga	32	0	4	0	2	0	38	0
Sturm Graz	2020–21	Austrian Bundesliga	31	0	5	0	0	0	36	0
Sturm Graz	2021–22	Austrian Bundesliga	32	0	3	0	8	0	43	0
Sturm Graz	2022–23	Austrian Bundesliga	16	0	2	0	8 (Note: Two appearances in UEFA Champions League, six appearances in UEFA Europa League)	0	26	0
Sturm Graz	Total		179	0	20	0	25	0	224	0
LASK	2023–24	Austrian Bundesliga	0	0	2	0	0	0	2	0
LASK	2024–25	Austrian Bundesliga	11	0	2	0	6 (Note: Two appearances in UEFA Europa League, four appearances in UEFA Conference League)	0	19	0
LASK	Total		11	0	4	0	6	0	21	0
Career total			325	1	31	0	35	0	391	1

== Honours ==
Sturm Graz

- Austrian Cup: 2017–18
