= Thorsten Röcher =

Austrian footballer

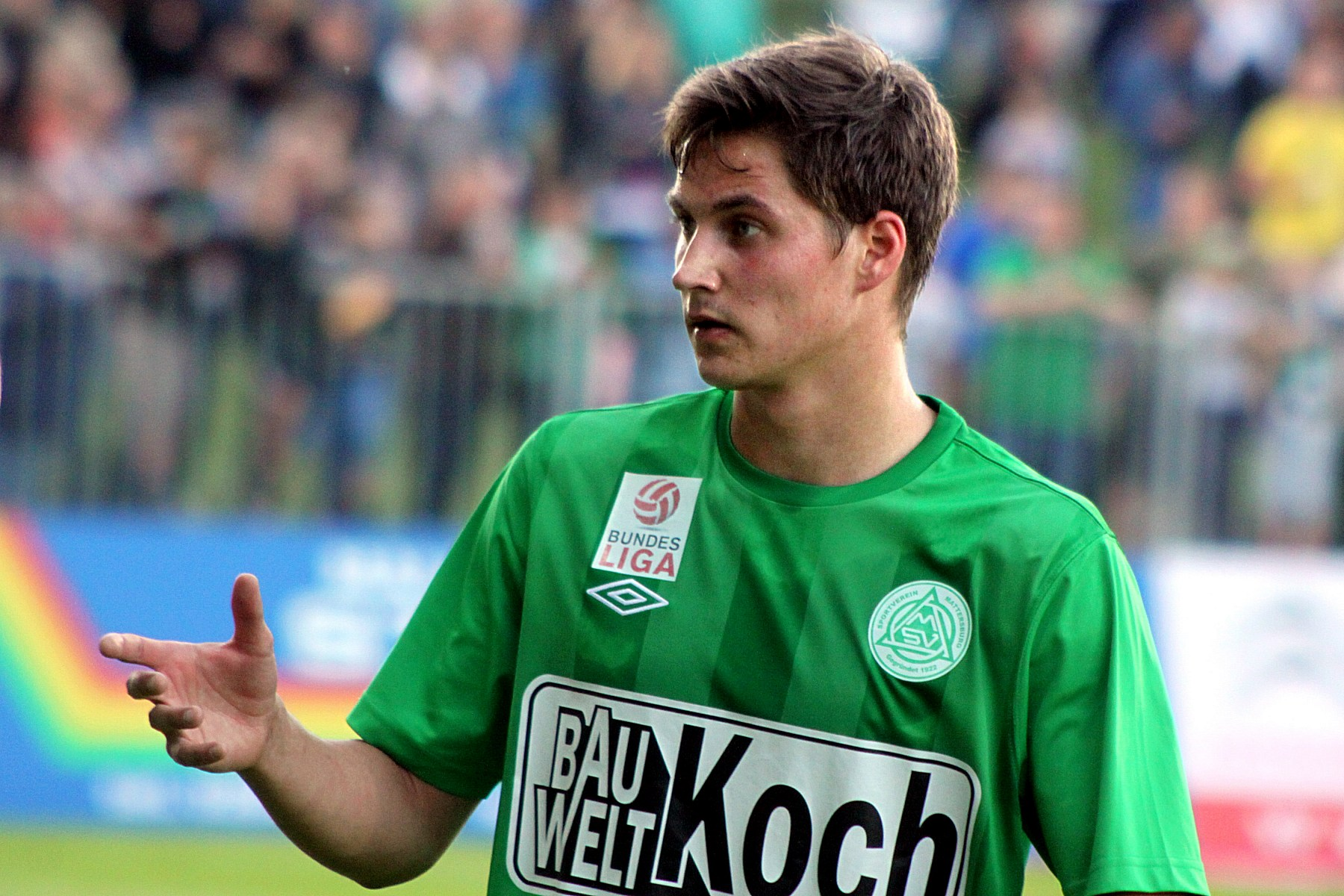
- Röcher in 2013

Personal information
- Date of birth: 11 June 1991 (age 35)
- Place of birth: Neunkirchen, Austria
- Height: 1.81 m (5 ft 11 in)
- Position: Winger

Team information
- Current team: SV Gloggnitz
- Number: 10

Senior career*
Years	Team	Apps	(Gls)
2006–2010	SV Gloggnitz	62	(43)
2011–2017	SV Mattersburg	168	(14)
2017–2018	Sturm Graz	29	(6)
2018–2021	FC Ingolstadt	17	(2)
2019–2020	→ Sturm Graz (loan)	23	(5)
2021–2024	Wolfsberger AC	87	(14)
2024–2025	Wolfsberger AC II	3	(0)
2025–	SV Gloggnitz	22	(2)
- * Club domestic league appearances and goals as of 21 June 2026

Thorsten Röcher (born 11 June 1991) is an Austrian professional footballer who plays as a winger for SV Gloggnitz.

== Career ==
On 9 May 2018, Röcher played as Sturm Graz beat Red Bull Salzburg in extra time to win the 2017–18 Austrian Cup.

On 4 July 2019, while under contract at FC Ingolstadt, he returned to Sturm Graz on loan with a purchase option.

== Honours ==
Sturm Graz

- Austrian Cup: 2017–18
