= Rexhe Bytyçi =

Albanian footballer (born 1987)

Personal information
- Date of birth: 5 May 1987 (age 39)
- Place of birth: Istog, SFR Yugoslavia (now Kosovo)
- Height: 1.87 m (6 ft 2 in)
- Position: Striker

Senior career*
Years	Team	Apps	(Gls)
2004–2005	Vorwärts Steyr		
2005–2006	Las Palmas		
2006–2007	Schwanenstadt	5	(0)
2007–2008	Portuense		
2008	Dénia		
2009	Grödig	6	(0)
2009–2010	Horn	8	(0)
2010–2011	Leoben	26	(19)
2011–2012	Hartberg	18	(5)
2012	LASK ll	10	(1)
2012	LASK	1	(0)
2012–2013	Austria Klagenfurt	22	(7)
2013–2014	Vorwärts Steyr	23	(4)
2014–2018	Union St. Florian	106	(46)
2018–2019	Vorwärts Steyr	6	(0)
- * Club domestic league appearances and goals

Rexhë Bytyçi (born 5 May 1987) is an Albanian footballer from Kosovo who plays as a striker.

He lived in Austria for many years which means he is eligible to play for Albania, Austria and Kosovo. During the 2006–07 season, Bytyçi was on trial with the reserve team of the Spanish side Real Betis Balompié, but he didn't pass the test.
