= Sally Preininger =

Austrian footballer

Personal information
- Full name: Sally Christian Preininger
- Date of birth: 3 January 1996 (age 30)
- Place of birth: Graz, Austria
- Height: 1.75 m (5 ft 9 in)
- Position: Forward

Team information
- Current team: SC Kalsdorf
- Number: 11

Senior career*
Years	Team	Apps	(Gls)
2013–2015	Sturm Graz II	12	(0)
2015	→ SC Fürstenfeld (loan)	15	(1)
2015–2019	SV Horn	77	(8)
2019–	SC Kalsdorf	13	(3)
- * Club domestic league appearances and goals as of 31 October 2019

Sally Christian Preininger (born 3 January 1996) is an Austrian footballer currently playing for SC Kalsdorf in the Austrian Regionalliga Central.
