= Kenta Kawanaka =

Japanese footballer

Personal information
- Date of birth: 5 November 1997 (age 29)
- Place of birth: Osaka, Japan
- Height: 1.72 m (5 ft 7 1/2 in)
- Position: Midfielder

Youth career
- Iwata FC
- 2013–2015: Hatsushiba Hashimoto High School

Senior career*
Years	Team	Apps	(Gls)
2016–2018	SV Horn	32	(1)
2017	→ SC Mannsdorf (loan)	13	(2)
2019	Fukushima United	8	(0)
2020–2022	Matsue City	12	(3)
2022-	Veertien Mie		
- * Club domestic league appearances and goals as of 10 November 2020

Kenta Kawanaka (川中賢太, Kawanaka Kenta; born 5 November 1997 in Osaka) is a Japanese footballer who currently plays for Veertien Mie.

== Career ==
=== Fukushima United ===
Kawanaka joined Fukushima United FC on 1 January 2019, after signing with the club on 8 December 2018. He was released at the end of the 2019 season.

== Career statistics ==
=== Club ===
As of 10 November 2020.

Club	Season	League			Cup		Other		Total	
Club	Season	Division	Apps	Goals	Apps	Goals	Apps	Goals	Apps	Goals
SV Horn	2015–16	Austrian Regionalliga East	9	0	0	0	0	0	9	0
SV Horn	2016–17	Erste Liga	1	0	1 (Note: Appearances in the Austrian Cup)	0	0	0	2	0
SV Horn	2017–18	Austrian Regionalliga East	22	1	2	1	0	0	24	2
SV Horn	Total		32	1	3	1	0	0	35	2
SC Mannsdorf (loan)	2016–17	Austrian Regionalliga East	13	2	0	0	0	0	13	2
Fukushima United	2019	J3 League	8	0	0	0	0	0	8	0
Matsue City	2020	JFL	12	3	1 (Note: Appearances in the Emperor's Cup)	0	0	0	12	3
Career total			65	6	4	1	0	0	69	7
