= Frank Egharevba =

Nigerian footballer

Personal information
- Date of birth: 15 December 1985 (age 40)
- Place of birth: Benin City, Nigeria
- Height: 1.83 m (6 ft 0 in)
- Position: Forward

Youth career
- 1999–2003: IC Favoriten
- 2003–2004: Karpaty Lviv

Senior career*
Years	Team	Apps	(Gls)
2004–2006	Tomasovia Tomaszów Lubelski		
2005	→ Widzew Łódź (loan)	6	(1)
2006	→ Śląsk Wrocław (loan)	9	(2)
2006–2007	Naters	26	(15)
2007–2008	Schwadorf	24	(9)
2008–2009	Admira Wacker	4	(0)
2009	→ Naters (loan)	14	(7)
2009–2010	Javor Ivanjica	13	(4)
2010–2011	Austria Lustenau	26	(5)
2011–2012	Naters	23	(13)
2012–2013	Solothurn	12	(3)
2013–2014	Würmla	43	(45)
2015	Stripfing	10	(2)
2015–2016	Würmla	42	(30)
2017	Wimpassing	31	(16)
2018	ASV Spratzern	7	(2)
2018–2019	Oberpetersdorf/Schwarzenbach	13	(9)
2019	Blau-Weiß Feldkirch	11	(3)
2019	FC Schlins		
2020	FC Rätia Bludenz		
- * Club domestic league appearances and goals

Frank Egharevba (born 15 December 1985) is a Nigerian former professional footballer who played as a forward.

== Career ==
After playing in the youth team of Rapid Wien until 2003.he moved in summer that year to Ukraine and played for one year with reserves squad of Karpaty Lviv.

It was in summer 2004 that Egharevba begin his senior career by signing with Polish club Tomasovia Tomaszów Lubelski where he will stay until summer 2006. During this period he was loaned twice to other stronger Polish clubs, first in the second half of the 2004–05 season to Widzew Łódź and second time in the second half of the 2005–06 to Śląsk Wrocław. After the contract expired in summer 2006, he moved to Switzerland and signed with FC Naters where he will have a major role in the club by scoring 15 goals in 26 league matches. After that season Austrian club SK Schwadorf 1936 signed him in summer 2007, where 9 goals in 24 league matches called the attention of VfB Admira Wacker Mödling to sign him in the next summer. Not having much chances to play with Admira, he will return to Schwadorf as a loaned player for the second half of the 2008–09 season where he will return to the good exhibitions by scoring 7 goals in 14 league matches. At the end of the season Egharevba received an offer from Serbian SuperLiga club Javor Ivanjica where he will play 13 league matches scoring once but, probably because of the introduction of foreign players limit by the federation and the fact that the club already had a number of African and South American players made him being dropt from the chart for the second half of the season. In summer 2010 he returned to Austria this time signing with Austria Lustenau playing in the Erste Liga. In summer 2011 he moved back to FC Naters playing in the Swiss 1. Liga and scored 13 goals in 23 games. In summer 2012 he moved to same level Swiss club FC Solothurn.
