= Union St. Florian =

- Full name: Union Sankt Florian
- Founded: 1947
- Ground: Sportpark St. Florian
- Capacity: 2,500
- Chairman: (Austria) Robert Zeitlinger
- Manager: (Austria) Herbert Panholzer
- League: OÖ Liga
- 2007/2008: 10th

Union St. Florian are an Austrian association football club founded in 1947 playing in the 4th tier OÖ Liga during 2020/21 season. They finished 10th the previous season.

== Current squad ==
As of 18 July 2016

Note: Flags indicate national team as defined under FIFA eligibility rules; some limited exceptions apply. Players may hold more than one non-FIFA nationality.

No.	Pos.	Nation	Player
1	GK	AUT	Alexander Strobl
3	MF	AUT	Thomas Winkler
4	DF	AUT	Roland Hinterreiter
5	DF	AUT	Rudi Naderer
6	MF	AUT	Nenad Stankovic
6	DF	AUT	Peter Riedl
7	MF	AUT	Marco Mittermayr
8	MF	AUT	Gabriel Schneider
10	MF	AUT	Attila Varga
11	FW	ALB	Rexhe Bytyci
12	MF	AUT	Timo Streibl
15	DF	AUT	Dominik Winkler

No.	Pos.	Nation	Player
17	DF	AUT	Amar Kadic
18	MF	AUT	Ivan Jurkic
20	MF	AUT	Philipp Frühwirt
22	GK	AUT	Stefan Sandner
—	MF	AUT	Jakob Lutz
—	FW	AUT	Igor Kutic
—	DF	AUT	Benedikt Hofer
—	GK	AUT	Andreas Michl
—	GK	AUT	Klaus Schützeneder
—	GK	AUT	Clemens Moser

== Staff and board members ==
- Manager: (Austria) Herbert Panholzer
- Assistant Manager: (Austria) Gerhard Obermüller
- Goalkeeper coach: (Austria) Thomas Mayrbäul
- President: (Austria) Hans Höfler
- Vice President: (Austria) Hans Höfler & Walter Meinhart
