= Tamás Tiefenbach =

Hungarian footballer

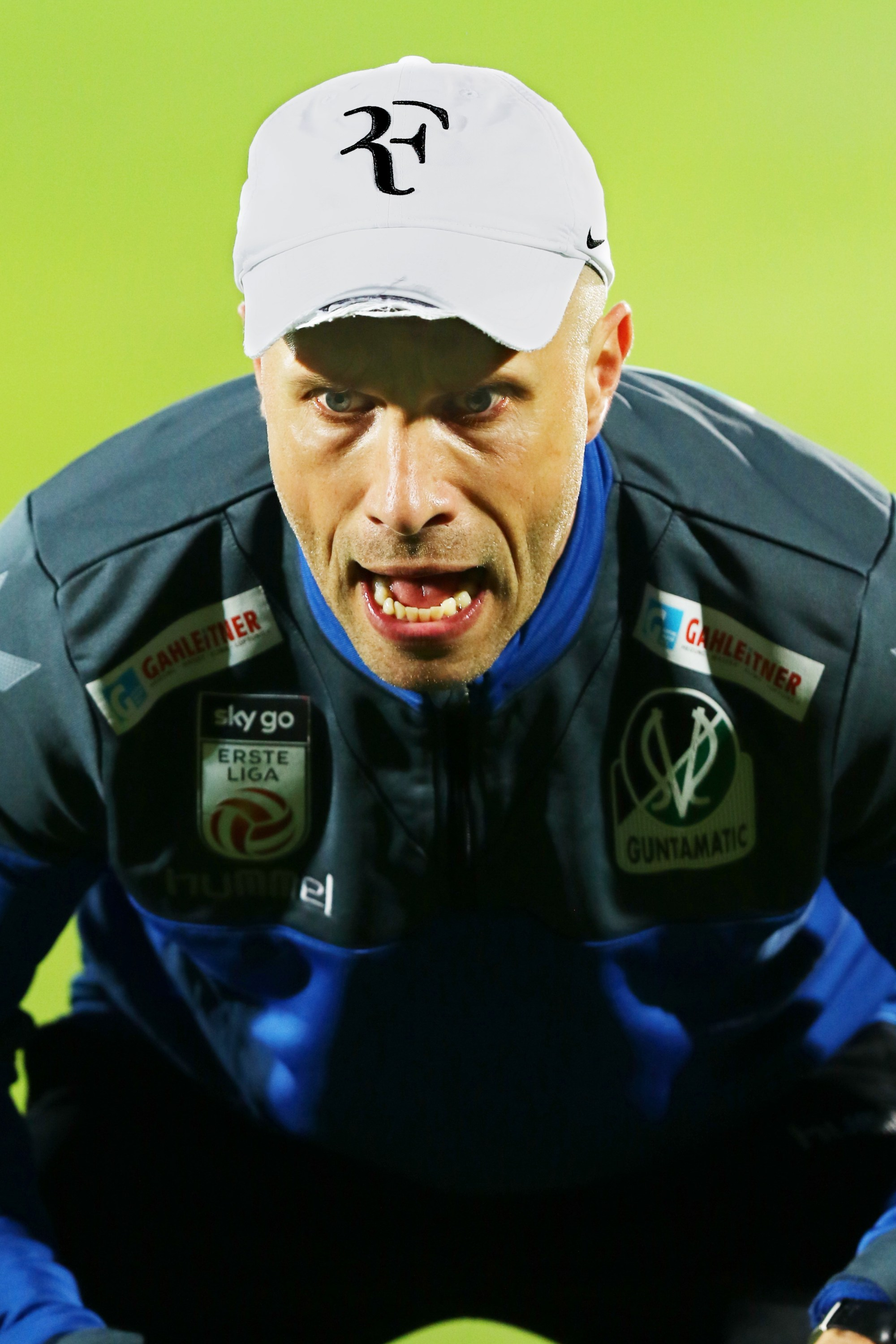

Personal information
- Date of birth: 25 December 1972 (age 53)
- Place of birth: Budapest, Hungary
- Height: 1.76 m (5 ft 9 in)
- Position: Forward

Senior career*
Years	Team	Apps	(Gls)
1991–1993	Újpesti TE		
1993–1994	FC St. Gallen		
1995–1996	Újpesti TE		
1996	FC St. Gallen		
1997–2000	Austria Lustenau		
2000–2001	VfB Admira Wacker Mödling		
2001–2003	Austria Lustenau		
2003–2006	VfB Hohenems		
2008–2009	VfB Hohenems		

Managerial career
- 2009–2014: VfB Hohenems (youth)
- 2014–2017: SC Austria Lustenau (assistant)
- 2017–2019: SV Ried (assistant)
- 2019–: SC Austria Lustenau (assistant)
- 2019: SC Austria Lustenau (caretaker)
- * Club domestic league appearances and goals

Tamás Tiefenbach (born 25 December 1972) is a Hungarian football coach and a former striker. He is an assistant coach with Austrian club SC Austria Lustenau.
