= Marcel Holzer =

Austrian footballer

Personal information
- Date of birth: 6 October 1998 (age 28)
- Place of birth: Austria
- Height: 1.86 m (6 ft 1 in)
- Position: Forward

Team information
- Current team: SR Donaufeld
- Number: 9

Youth career
- 2004–2007: ASK Klagenfurt
- 2007–2012: Klagenfurter AC
- 2012–2014: AKA Kärnten
- 2014–2015: Austria Wien

Senior career*
Years	Team	Apps	(Gls)
2015–2016	SV Rosegg	8	(4)
2016–2017	Wolfsberger AC II	34	(19)
2016	Wolfsberger AC	3	(0)
2017–2019	TSV Hartberg	21	(1)
2019	→ SKU Amstetten (loan)	3	(0)
2019–2022	Wolfsberger AC II	28	(10)
2019–2022	Wolfsberger AC	6	(0)
2020	→ SKU Amstetten (loan)	7	(0)
2022–2023	Wiener SC	36	(11)
2023–	SR Donaufeld	81	(36)
- * Club domestic league appearances and goals as of 28 June 2026

Marcel Holzer (born 6 October 1998) is an Austrian professional footballer who plays for SR Donaufeld.

== Career ==
=== Wolfsberger AC ===
On 29 August 2019, Holzer returned to Wolfsberger AC where he was registered for the club's reserve team. On 15 December 2019, Holzer sat on the bench for the first team against FK Austria Wien. During the winter break of the 2019–20 season, he was promoted to the first team again. By the end of the 2019–20 season, he had made 6 appearances in the Bundesliga, in the abandoned Regionalliga season due to the COVID-19 pandemic he made 11 appearances and scored 1 goal.

After being fifth on the striker depth chart at Wolfsberger AC ahead of the 2020–21 season after the signings of Dario Vizinger and Dejan Joveljić, Holzer was sent on loan to 2. Liga club SKU Amstetten after 4 appearances for the reserves in September 2020. This was his second loan spell at Amstetten after having spent six months at the club while under contract at TSV Hartberg. At Amstetten, however, as in 2019, he failed to win the starting position as David Peham was favoured and only made 7 second division appearances for the Lower Austrians. In January 2021, he returned to Wolfsberger AC prior to the end of his loan deal.
