= Eldar Topić =

Bosnian footballer

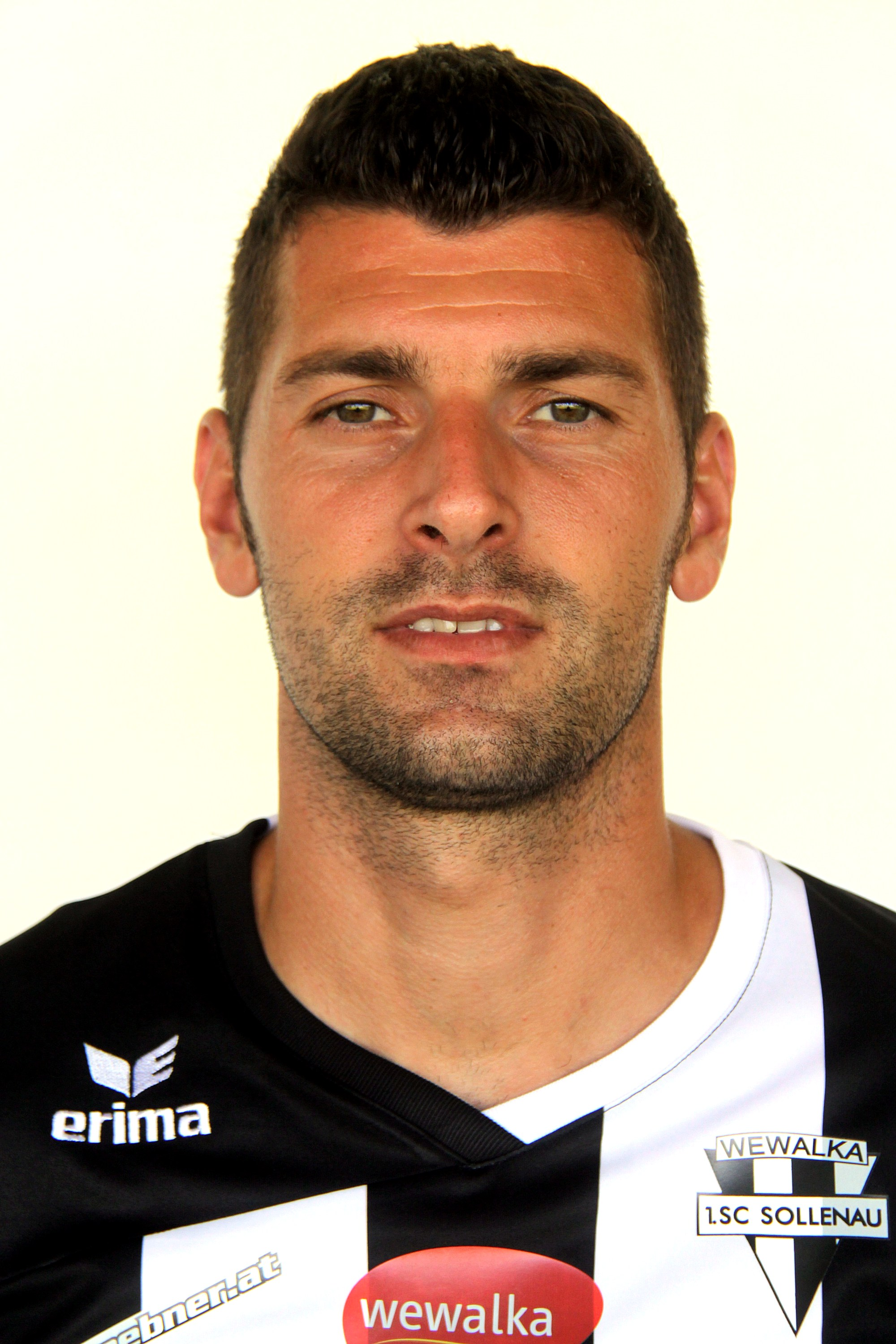
- Topić in 2014

Personal information
- Date of birth: May 29, 1983 (age 43)
- Place of birth: Bosanska Dubica, SFR Yugoslavia
- Height: 1.86 m (6 ft 1 in)
- Position: Forward

Team information
- Current team: ASK Ebreichsdorf (youth coach)

Youth career
- 1993–1996: ASV 13
- 1996–2001: Rapid Wien

Senior career*
Years	Team	Apps	(Gls)
2001–2002	SV Mattersburg	17	(1)
2002–2003	Lustenau 07	25	(2)
2003–2004	Sturm Graz	0	(0)
2004–2005	Rapid Wien	3	(0)
2005	Austria Lustenau	9	(0)
2005–2008	St. Pölten	60	(39)
2008–2010	Austria Wien	15	(1)
2010–2011	First Vienna	24	(2)
2011–2012	SKU Amstetten	27	(11)
2012–2015	SC Sollenau	73	(29)
2015–2016	SV St. Margarethen	23	(5)
2016–2018	SV Wimpassing	52	(16)
2018–2019	FCM Traiskirchen	14	(1)
2019	ASV Siegendorf	7	(1)
2019	ASK Trumau	7	(3)
2020	Wiener Neustadt II	0	(0)
2020	SC Pottenstein	3	(0)

Managerial career
- 2017–2018: SV Wimpassing (player-manager)
- 2018: SV Wimpassing (player-assistant)
- 2019: ASK Trumau (player-manager)
- 2020: FCM Traiskirchen (assistant)
- * Club domestic league appearances and goals

Eldar Topić (born 29 May 1983 in Bosanska Dubica, Yugoslavia) is a Bosnian retired footballer.

== Playing career ==
=== Club ===
Topić spent his entire career playing on different levels of the Austrian football pyramid, most notably with Vienna powerhouses Rapid and Austria.

== Managerial career ==
In July 2016, Topić SV Wimpassing. On 3 April 2017, he was appointed player-manager of the club. In February 2018, he was replaced by Milivoj Vujanovic, but Topić continued at the club as a player-assistant. However, he announced in May 2018, that he would leave the club at the end of the season.

Topić' next coaching experience came in June 2019, where he was appointed player-manager of ASK Trumau. In November 2019 it was confirmed, that he would leave Trumau at the end of 2019 to become the assistant manager of FCM Traiskirchen. However, he left his position about three weeks into 2020, to join SC Wiener Neustadt where he was going to work as an individual coach for the U15 and U17 teams, and also play for the club's second/amateur team.

In the summer 2020, he became head coach of ASK Ebreichsdorf's U16s.
