= Philipp Siegl =

Austrian footballer (born 1993)

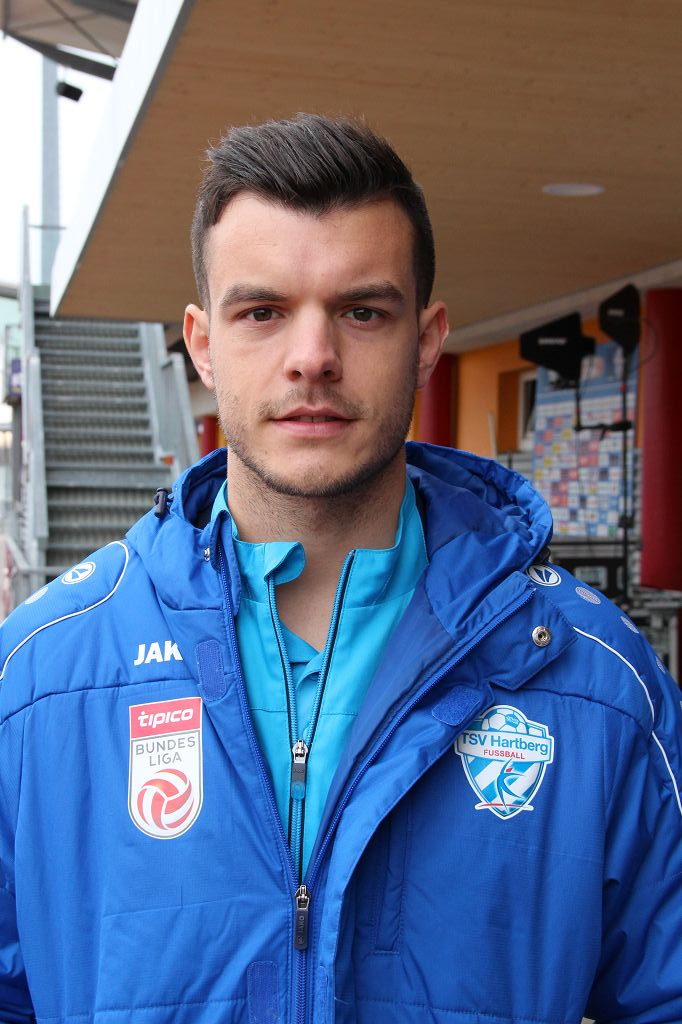

Personal information
- Date of birth: 16 December 1993 (age 32)
- Height: 1.85 m (6 ft 1 in)
- Position: Defensive midfielder

Team information
- Current team: SV Oberwart
- Number: 8

Youth career
- 1999–2007: ASKÖ Stinatz
- 2007–2009: AKA Burgenland
- 2009: TSV Hartberg

Senior career*
Years	Team	Apps	(Gls)
2009–2011	TSV Hartberg II	3	
2011–2012	ASKÖ Stinatz	13	(3)
2012–2013	SV Mattersburg II	15	(1)
2013–2014	SV Stegersbach	27	(1)
2014–2015	SV Lafnitz	20	(0)
2015–2019	TSV Hartberg	97	(8)
2019–2020	SV Horn	20	(1)
2020–2025	SV Lafnitz	107	(7)
2023–2025	SV Lafnitz II	13	(2)
2025–	SV Oberwart	19	(1)
- * Club domestic league appearances and goals as of 17 June 2026

Philipp Siegl (born 16 December 1993) is an Austrian professional footballer who plays as a defensive midfielder for SV Oberwart.

== Club career ==
He made his Austrian Football First League debut for TSV Hartberg on 11 August 2017 in a game against FC Liefering.

On 17 June 2025, Siegl joined SV Oberwart.
