= Daniel Gremsl =

Austrian footballer

Personal information
- Date of birth: 2 August 1992 (age 34)
- Place of birth: Hartberg, Austria
- Height: 1.70 m (5 ft 7 in)
- Position: Attacking midfielder

Team information
- Current team: SV Lafnitz
- Number: 10

Youth career
- 2000–2006: TSV Hartberg
- 2006–2007: GAK
- 2007–2010: TSV Hartberg

Senior career*
Years	Team	Apps	(Gls)
2010–2013	TSV Hartberg	43	(2)
2013	FC Admira Wacker Mödling II	10	(0)
2013–2016	FC Admira Wacker Mödling	2	(0)
2013–2016	→ TSV Hartberg (loan)	52	(3)
2016–2017	TSV Hartberg	63	(13)
2018–2019	FSV Zwickau	17	(1)
2019–2020	SKU Amstetten	36	(1)
2020–	SV Lafnitz	84	(13)
- * Club domestic league appearances and goals as of 20 June 2023

Daniel Gremsl (born 2 August 1992) is an Austrian professional footballer who plays for SV Lafnitz.

== Club career ==
He made his Austrian Football First League debut for TSV Hartberg on 2 August 2011 in a game against LASK Linz.
