= Patrick Schagerl =

Austrian footballer

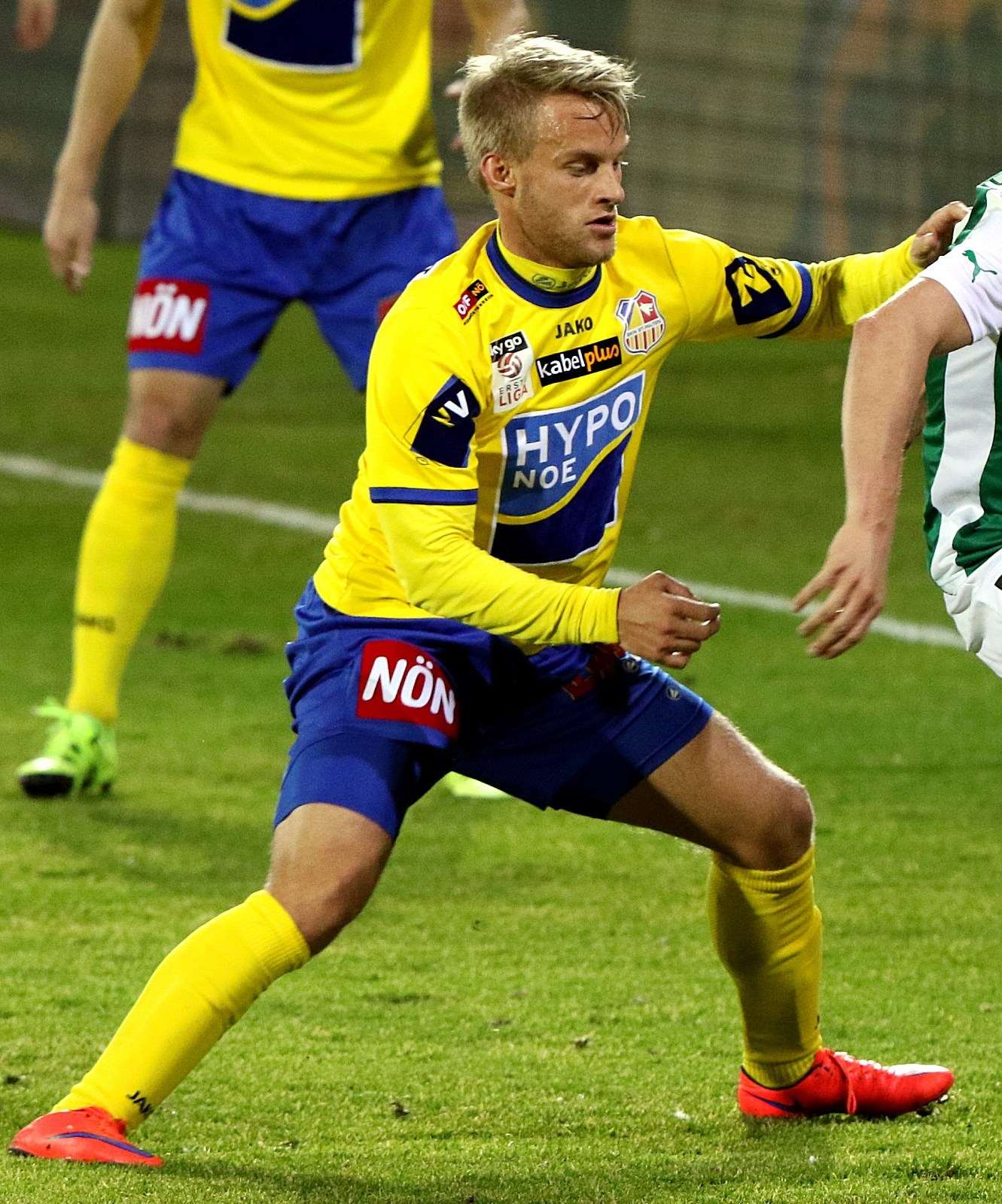
- Patrick Schagerl in 2016.

Personal information
- Date of birth: 20 September 1992 (age 34)
- Place of birth: Austria
- Height: 1.70 m (5 ft 7 in)
- Position: Left midfielder

Team information
- Current team: SKU Amstetten (athletic coach)

Youth career
- USC St. Georgen/Leys
- UFC Texingtal
- St. Pölten

Senior career*
Years	Team	Apps	(Gls)
2010	SC Herzogenburg	15	(1)
2010–2016	St. Pölten II	66	(13)
2010–2016	St. Pölten	60	(7)
2013–2014	→ First Vienna (loan)	30	(0)
2016–2017	Kapfenberger SV	15	(1)
2017–2018	Blau-Weiß Linz	12	(0)
2018–2021	SKU Amstetten	65	(5)

Managerial career
- 2021–: SKU Amstetten (athletic coach)
- * Club domestic league appearances and goals

Patrick Schagerl (born 20 September 1992) is an Austrian football coach and a former player. He is an athletic coach with SKU Amstetten.
