= Miroslav Milošević (footballer, born 1986) =

Austrian footballer

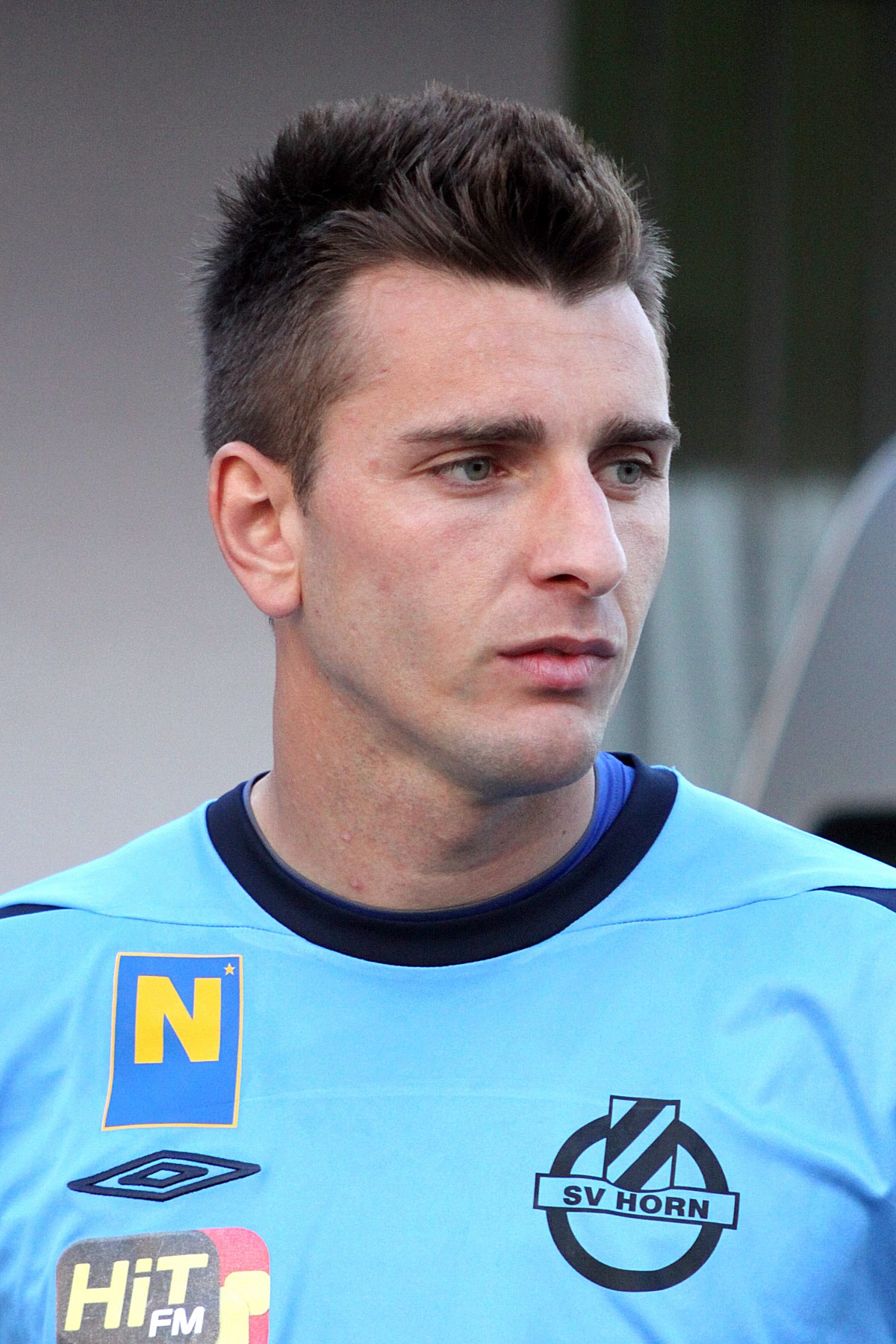
- Milošević in 2012

Personal information
- Date of birth: 28 March 1986 (age 40)
- Place of birth: Wien, Austria
- Height: 1.88 m (6 ft 2 in)
- Position: Midfielder

Team information
- Current team: SV Leobendorf
- Number: 10

Youth career
- 1997–2000: Slavija Vevče
- 2000–2001: SC Süssenbrunn
- 2001–2002: Post SV Wien
- 2002–2003: FC Mariahilf

Senior career*
Years	Team	Apps	(Gls)
2003–2007	FC Mariahilf		
2007–2008	First Vienna II		
2008–2010	First Vienna	64	(14)
2010–2011	SC/ESV Parndorf	28	(12)
2011–2013	SV Horn	62	(16)
2013–2014	FC Wacker Innsbruck	19	(0)
2014–2015	SC Ritzing	29	(11)
2015–2019	SV Horn	99	(40)
2019–2020	ASKÖ Oedt	15	(3)
2020–	SV Leobendorf	8	(6)
- * Club domestic league appearances and goals as of 20:33, 25 October 2020 (UTC)

Miroslav Milošević (born 28 March 1986) is an Austrian footballer who currently plays for SV Leobendorf. Milošević is of Serbian descent and is therefore able to represent both Austria and Serbia at international level.
