= 1919–20 Austrian Cup =

Tournament details
- Country: Austria

Final positions
- Champions: Rapid Wien
- Runners-up: SV Amateure

The 1919–20 Austrian Cup (German: ÖFB-Cup) was the 2nd season of Austria's nationwide football cup competition. The final was held at the Simmeringer Sportplatz, Vienna on 4 July 1920.

The competition was won by Rapid Wien after beating SV Amateure 5–2.

== Preliminary round ==
Team 1	Score	Team 2
23 November 1919
Nordstern Wien	1–11	Nussdorfer AC
20 January 1920
Badener AC	0–0	FC Ostmark
VfB Union Mödling	0–0	Ottakringer SC
25 January 1920
Favoritner Lyon	2–3 (a.e.t.)	Vienna Cricket&FC
Germania Schwechat	21–0	SV Tulln
Hermania Wien	0–0	SC Wieden
SC Helfort Wien	3–0	Wacker 1910 Wien
SK Favorit Wien	0–0	Favoritner AC
SK Slovan Wien	4–5	Favoritner FC Vorwärts 06
Sturm 1914 Wien	4–2	SV Gersthof
Viktoria XXI Wien	1–2	SC Donaustadt
Wr. Bewegungsspieler	0–4	Sturm 1907 Wien
Wr. Rasenspieler	0–13	Hakoah Wien
Wr. Sportvereinigung	0–3	Red Star Wien

== First round ==
Team 1	Score	Team 2
8 February 1920
1. St. Pöltener SC	0–0	VfB Union Mödling
Germania Schwechat	4–2	Artaria Wien
Hakoah Wien	5–3	1. Simmeringer SC
Libertas Wien	3–5	Red Star Wien
Meidlinger Sportfreunde	1–7	SC Rudolfshügel
Nussdorfer AC	1–0	Wiener Sportfreunde
SK Rapid Wien	5–1	Admira Wien
SC Helfort Wien	2–3	Sturm 1907 Wien
SC Wieden	0–5	Blue Star Wien
Sturm 1914 Wien	0–5	Floridsdorfer AC
Vienna Cricket&FC	0–0	Badener AC
Wacker Wien	1–0	Wr. Association FC
Wiener AC	8–0^{1}	Favoritner FC Vorwärts 06
SV Amateure	3–2	Hertha Wien
Wiener Sport-Club	3–1	First Vienna
21 February 1920
Favoritner AC	1–5	SC Donaustadt

- ^{1} Favoritner FC Vorwärts 06 won the tie because was Wiener AC fielded the ineligible player.

== Second round ==
Team 1	Score	Team 2
14 March 1920
Blue Star Wien	0–4	Floridsdorfer AC
Favoritner FC Vorwärts 06	1–5	Wiener Sport-Club
Nussdorfer AC	1–0	Wacker Wien
SK Rapid Wien	10–0	Red Star Wien
SC Rudolfshügel	3–0	Germania Schwechat
Sturm 1907 Wien	3–0	SC Donaustadt
Vienna Cricket&FC	0–4	Hakoah Wien
SV Amateure	15–0	1. St. Pöltener SC

== Quarter-finals ==
Team 1	Score	Team 2
13 May 1920
Floridsdorfer AC	2–2 (a.e.t.)^{1}	SV Amateure
Hakoah Wien	4–1 (a.e.t.)	Sturm 1907 Wien
Nussdorfer AC	0–6	Wiener Sport-Club
SC Rudolfshügel	1–2	SK Rapid Wien

- ^{1} SV Amateure won on the coin toss.

== Semi-finals ==
Team 1	Score	Team 2
16 June 1920
Hakoah Wien	1–3	SV Amateure
23 June 1920
SK Rapid Wien	1–0	Wiener Sport-Club

== Final ==
4 July 1920
17:30

SK Rapid Wien	5–2	SV Amateure
Wondrak 8'; Bauer 25'; Uridil 29'; Kuthan 84'; Wieser 88'	Report	Trinkl 32'; Konrad 25'

Simmeringer Sportplatz, Vienna
Attendance: 25,000
Referee: Heinrich Retschury
