= Philipp Posch =

Austrian footballer

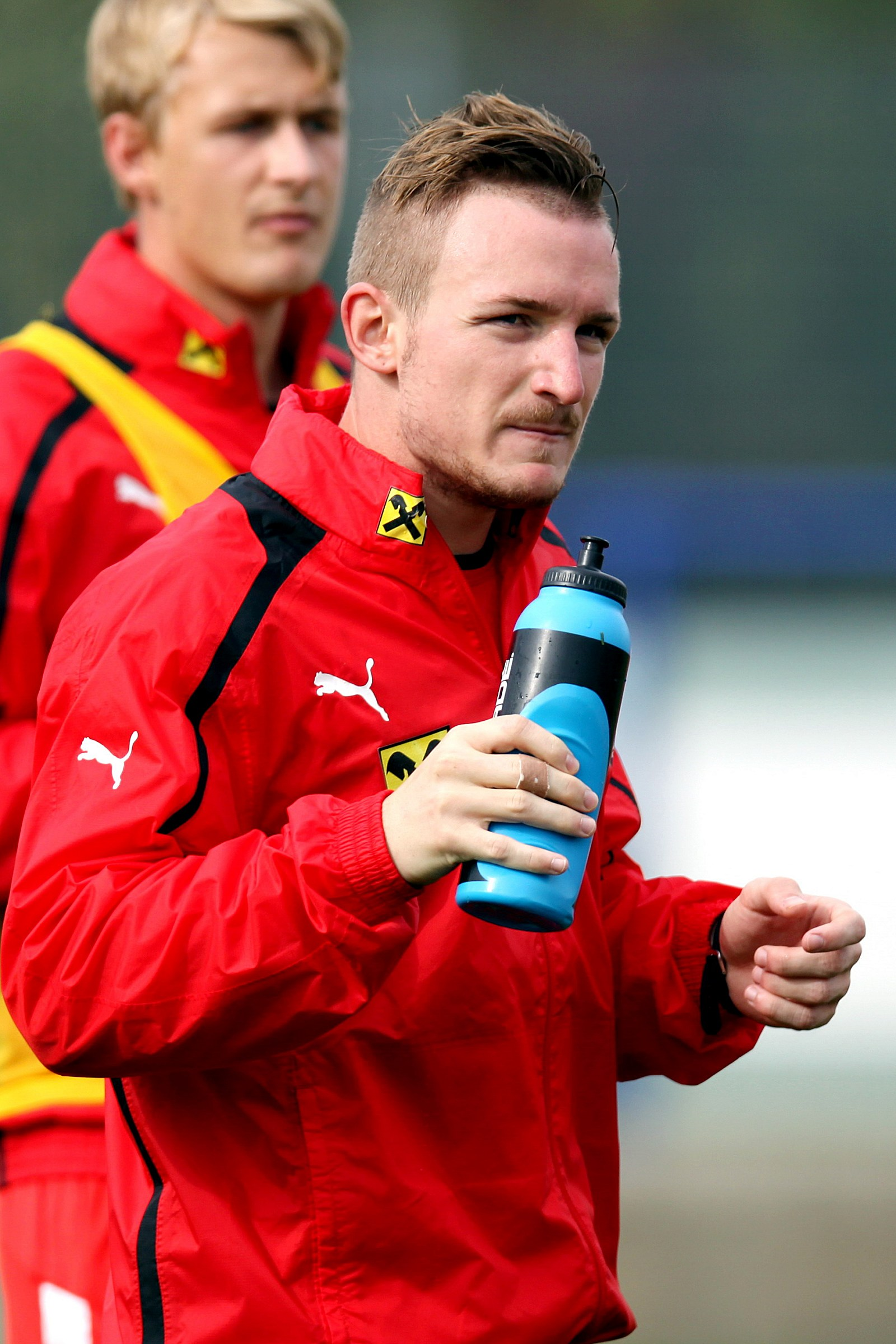

Personal information
- Full name: Philipp Posch
- Date of birth: 9 January 1994 (age 32)
- Place of birth: Judenburg, Austria
- Height: 1.80 m (5 ft 11 in)
- Position: Defender

Team information
- Current team: USV Mettersdorf
- Number: 32

Senior career*
Years	Team	Apps	(Gls)
2010–2017	Admira Wacker II	96	(2)
2013–2018	Admira Wacker	27	(0)
2013–2014	→ SV Horn (loan)	8	(0)
2014–2015	→ TSV Hartberg (loan)	15	(0)
2019–	USV Mettersdorf	0	(0)

International career^{‡}
2009–2010	Austria U16	6	(0)
2010–2011	Austria U17	7	(0)
2011	Austria U18	2	(0)
2012–2013	Austria U19	11	(0)
2015–2016	Austria U21	4	(1)
- * Club domestic league appearances and goals as of 28 April 2018 ‡ National team caps and goals as of 29 March 2016

Philipp Posch (born 9 January 1994) is an Austrian footballer who plays for USV Mettersdorf.
