= Felix Huspek =

Austrian footballer

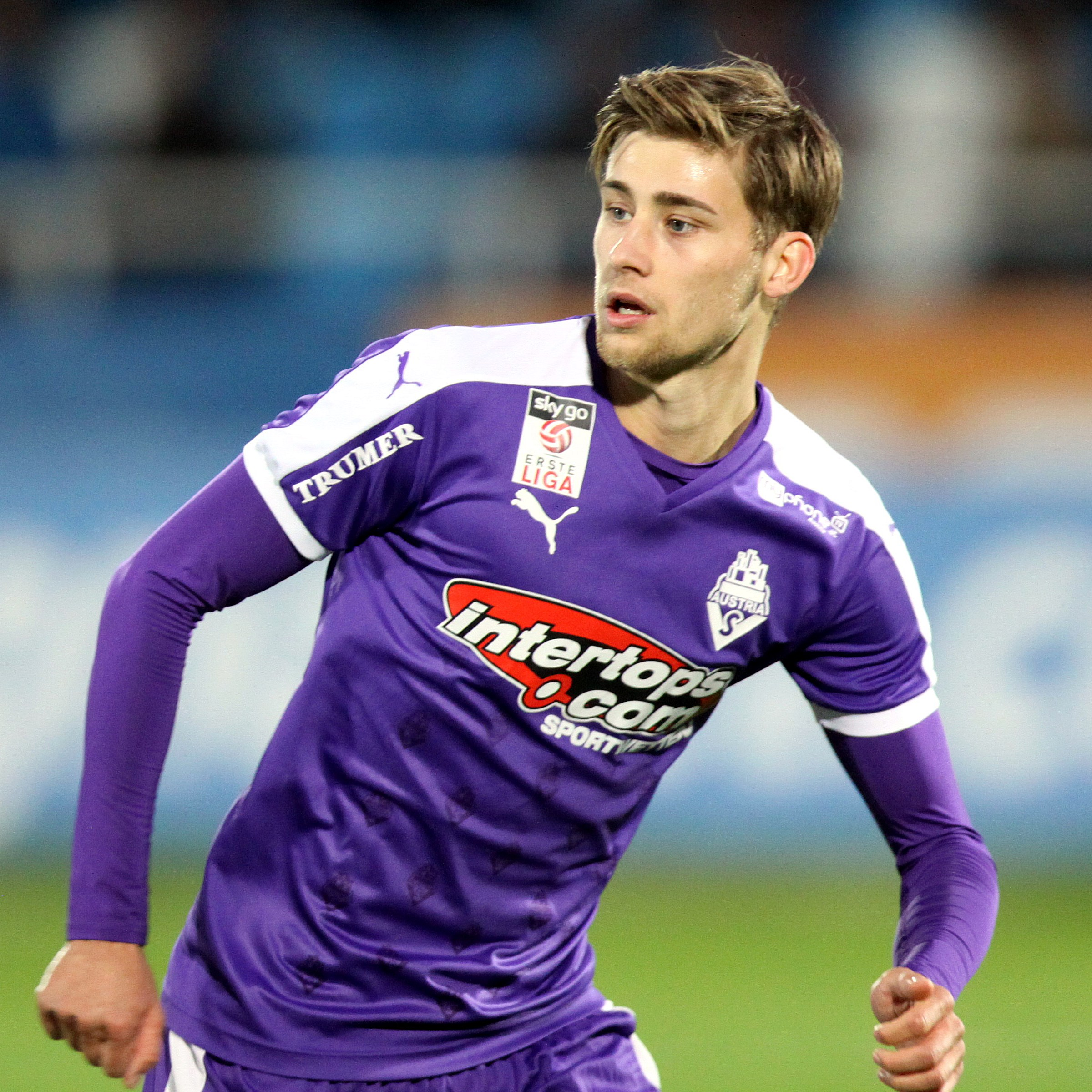
- Huspek with Austria Salzburg in 2015

Personal information
- Date of birth: 13 November 1992 (age 33)
- Place of birth: Schlüßlberg, Austria
- Height: 1.87 m (6 ft 1 1/2 in)
- Position: Centre back

Team information
- Current team: SV Wallern
- Number: 18

Youth career
- 1998–2004: SV Grieskirchen
- 2004–2007: SV Wallern
- 2007–2010: SV Ried

Senior career*
Years	Team	Apps	(Gls)
2010–2012	SV Ried II		
2012–2013	SV Wallern	13	(0)
2013–2016	Austria Salzburg	53	(0)
2016–2018	Blau-Weiß Linz	47	(0)
2018–	SV Wallern	151	(23)
- * Club domestic league appearances and goals as of 27 June 2026

Felix Huspek (born 13 November 1992) is an Austrian football player. He plays for SV Wallern.

== Club career ==
He made his Austrian Football First League debut for SV Austria Salzburg on 24 July 2015 in a game against SKN St. Pölten.

== Personal life ==
His older brother Philipp Huspek is also a football player.
