= Lukas Hupfauf =

Austrian footballer

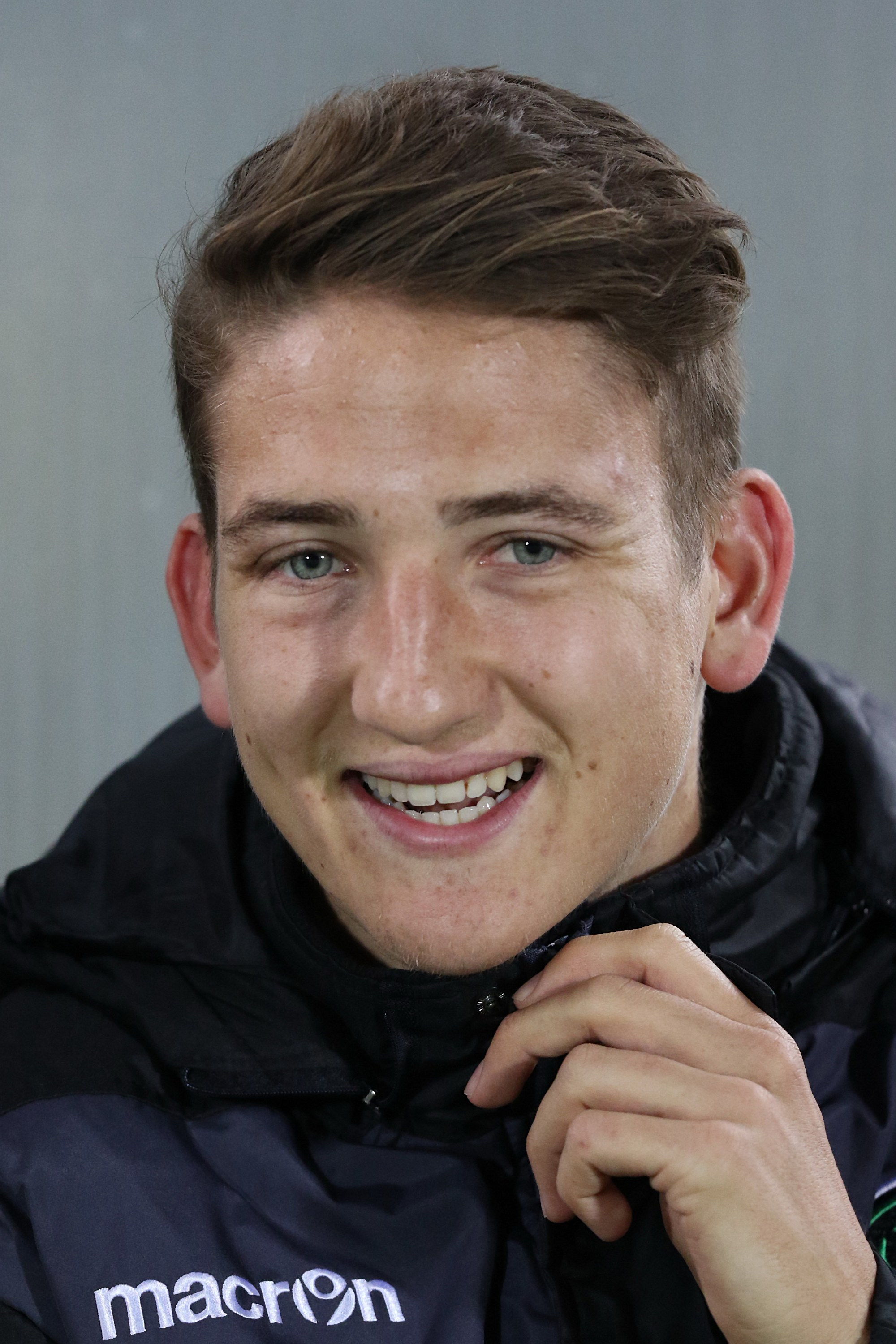

Personal information
- Date of birth: 11 July 1997 (age 29)
- Place of birth: Austria
- Height: 1.76 m (5 ft 9 in)
- Position: Defender

Team information
- Current team: SVG Reichenau
- Number: 24

Youth career
- 2003–2008: SV Matrei
- 2008–2009: Innsbrucker AC
- 2009–2009: SVG Reichenau
- 2009–2014: AKA Tirol

Senior career*
Years	Team	Apps	(Gls)
2014–2019	FC Wacker Innsbruck II	87	(1)
2017–2022	FC Wacker Innsbruck	93	(2)
2022–2024	FSV Frankfurt	26	(1)
2024–	SVG Reichenau	49	(3)

International career^{‡}
2014	Austria U18	1	(0)
- * Club domestic league appearances and goals as of 27 June 2026 ‡ National team caps and goals as of 26 April 2018

Lukas Hupfauf (born 11 July 1997) is an Austrian footballer who plays as defender for SVG Reichenau.

In August 2022, Hupfauf left FC Wacker Innsbruck for German club FSV Frankfurt, where he made 26 appearances and scored once in the Regionalliga Südwest over two seasons before returning to Austria with SVG Reichenau in July 2024.
