= Sandro Zakany =

Austrian footballer

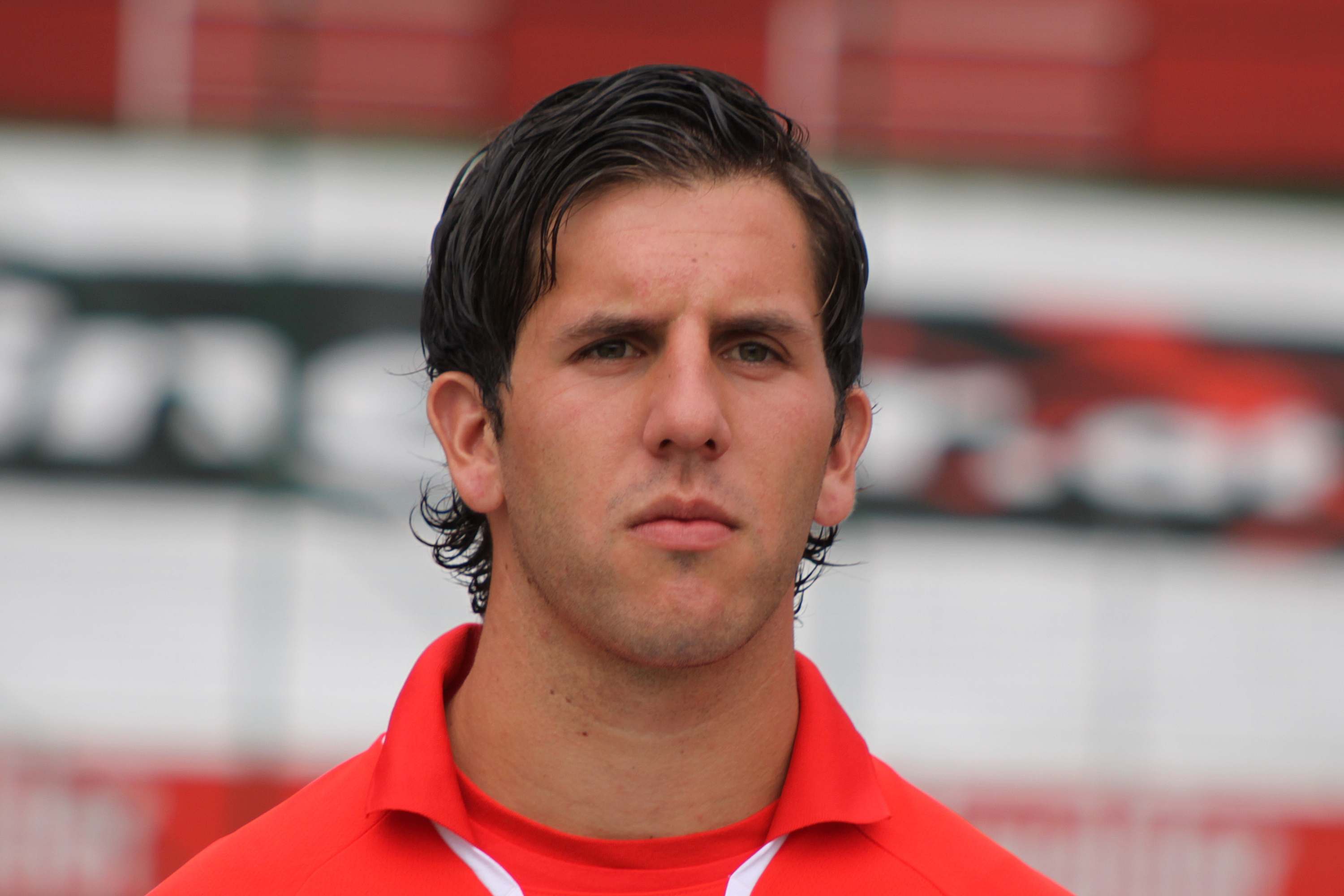

Personal information
- Date of birth: 23 September 1987 (age 39)
- Place of birth: Klagenfurt, Austria
- Height: 1.80 m (5 ft 11 in)
- Position: Midfielder

Team information
- Current team: SK Austria Klagenfurt
- Number: 10

Senior career*
Years	Team	Apps	(Gls)
2005–2007	FC Kärnten	65	(9)
2007–2008	SK Austria Kärnten	21	(0)
2008–2010	Admira Wacker	23	(0)
2010	LASK Linz	8	(0)
2010–2013	Wolfsberger AC	79	(6)
2013–	SK Austria Klagenfurt	88	(19)
- * Club domestic league appearances and goals as of 31 May 2016 (UTC)

Sandro Zakany (born 23 September 1987) is an Austrian footballer who plays for SK Austria Klagenfurt.
