= Philipp Huspek =

Austrian footballer

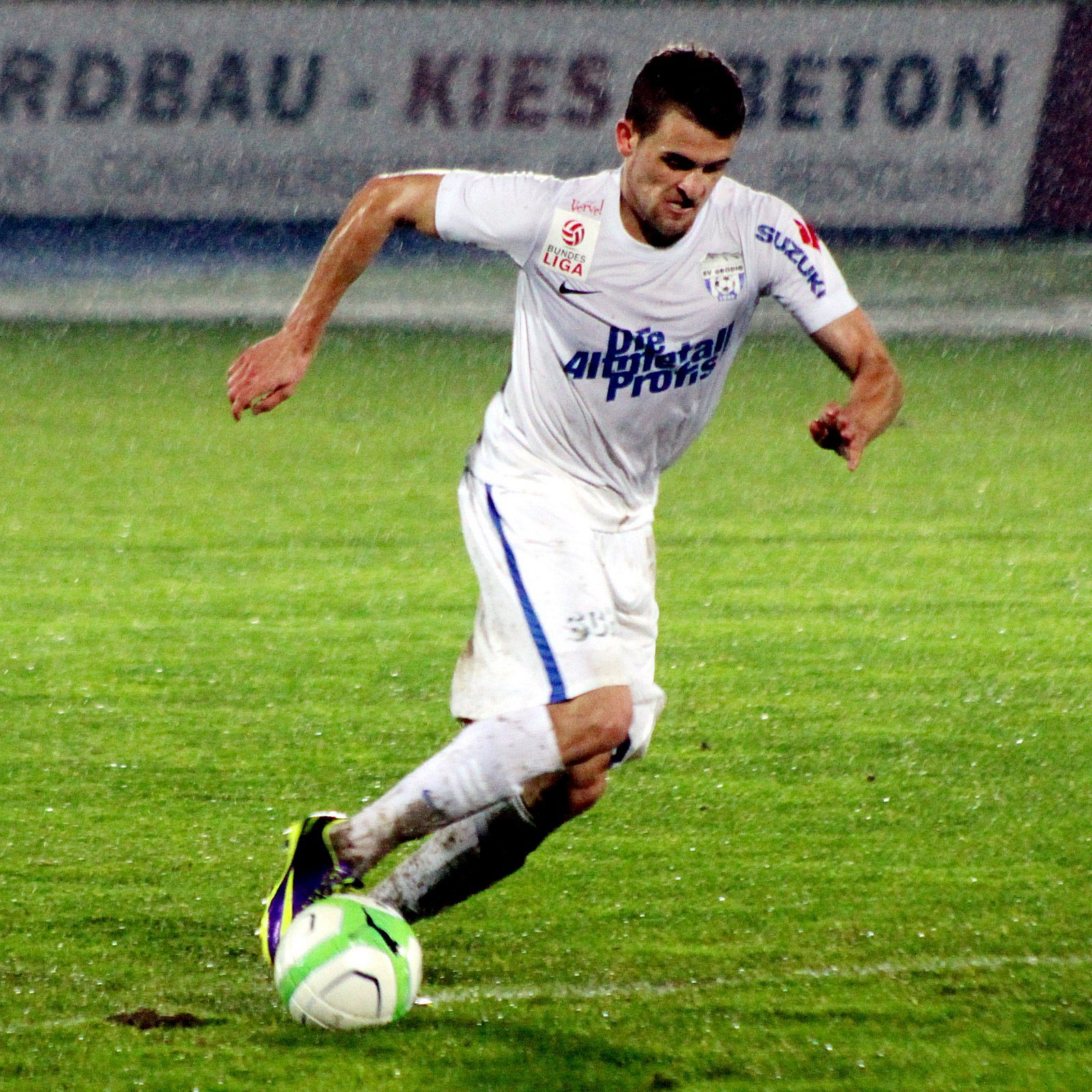
- Huspek, 23 November 2013

Personal information
- Full name: Philipp Huspek
- Date of birth: 5 February 1991 (age 35)
- Place of birth: Grieskirchen, Austria
- Height: 1.72 m (5 ft 8 in)
- Position: Attacking midfielder

Team information
- Current team: Wallern
- Number: 19

Senior career*
Years	Team	Apps	(Gls)
2008–2012	SV Ried	32	(1)
2011–2012	→ Blau-Weiss Linz (loan)	32	(1)
2012–2013	Blau-Weiss Linz	35	(6)
2013–2015	Grödig	69	(11)
2015–2016	Rapid Wien	6	(0)
2016	→ LASK Linz (loan)	15	(1)
2016–2022	Sturm Graz	106	(10)
2021–2022	Sturm Graz II	19	(7)
2022–	Wallern	100	(15)
- * Club domestic league appearances and goals as of 27 June 2026

Philipp Huspek (born 5 February 1991) is an Austrian professional association football player currently playing for Wallern. He plays as a midfielder.

== Personal life ==
His younger brother Felix Huspek is also a football player.
