= 2019–20 Austrian Cup =

Tournament details
- Country: Austria

Final positions
- Champions: Red Bull Salzburg
- Runners-up: Austria Lustenau

Tournament statistics
- Matches played: 63
- Goals scored: 286 (4.54 per match)
- Top goal scorer(s): Ronivaldo (7 goals)

The 2019–20 Austrian Cup was the 89th edition of the national cup in Austrian football. The champions of the cup earn a place in the 2020–21 Europa League group stage.

Red Bull Salzburg were the defending champions after winning the competition in the previous season by defeating Rapid Wien in the final. Times up to 26 October 2019 and from 29 March 2020 are CEST (UTC+2), and times from 27 October 2019 to 28 March 2020 are CET (UTC+1).

== First round ==
Thirty–two first round matches were played between 19 and 21 July 2019.

19 July 2019	USK Anif	1–4	Sturm Graz	Anif
18:30	Dicker 36'	Report	Hosiner 7'; Kiteishvili 30'; Domínguez 67'; Eze 78'	Stadium: Sportzentrum Anif

19 July 2019	ASK-BSC Bruck/Leitha	0–4	Ried	Bruck an der Leitha
19:30		Report	Kerhe 32'; Betancor 41', 43'; Canillas 80'	Stadium: Parkstadion Bruck

19 July 2019	FC Langenegg	1–4	Austria Klagenfurt	Langenegg
19:30	Bentele 21'	Report	Zakany 38', 64' (pen.); Rusek 54'; Šaravanja 77'	Stadium: Sportplatz Fc Langenegg

19 July 2019	SK Treibach	1–2	WSG Swarovski Tirol	Althofen
19:30	Vaschauner 90'	Report	Dedić 49'; Nitzlnader 85'	Stadium: Turnerwald-Stadion

19 July 2019	ATSV Wolfsberg	4–1	ASK Elektra	Wolfsberg
20:00	Stoni 31'; Rupp 34', 42'; Mehmedović 68'	Report	Chiorean 46'	Stadium: ATSV Arena

19 July 2019	TuS Bad Gleichenberg	2–3	Vorwärts Steyr	Bad Gleichenberg
20:00	Forjan 20'; Roßmann 64'	Report	Bibaku 32'; Roman 68'; Martinović 77'	Stadium: Bad Gleichenberg Arena

19 July 2019	ASK Ebreichsdorf	2–1 (a.e.t.)	SV Lafnitz	Weigelsdorf
20:00	Gusić 7'; Frank 116'	Report	Varga 65'	Stadium: Sportzentrum Ebreichsdorf

19 July 2019	SV Hall	1–5	FC Juniors OÖ	Hall in Tirol
20:00	Buljubasic 82'	Report	Andy Reyes 44', 45+1', 51'; Cvetko 78'; Jelisic 86'	Stadium: Stadion Lend

19 July 2019	FC Kitzbühel	0–7	Wacker Innsbruck	Kitzbühel
20:00		Report	Şatin 2', 52'; Yildirim 51', 71', 89'; Ibrisimovic 84', 88'	Stadium: Sportplatz Langau

19 July 2019	FC Gleisdorf 09	4–0	ASV Draßburg	Gleisdorf
20:30	Gräfischer 10'; Domini Weiss 64', 76', 86'	Report		Stadium: Solarstadion der Stadt Gleisdorf

19 July 2019	SV Seekirchen 1945	1–4	SKU Amstetten	Seekirchen am Wallersee
20:30	Neuhofer 44'	Report	Maderner 31' (pen.), 49' (pen.); Puchegger 66'; Dirnberger 70'	Stadium: Sportzentrum Seekirchen

19 July 2019	Union Gurten	1–0	FC Zell am See	Gurten
20:30	Matijašević 18'	Report		Stadium: Park21-Arena Gurten

19 July 2019	Wiener SC	2–6	Dornbirn 1913	Wien
20:30	Dimov 90+1'; Josic 90+3'	Report	Allgäuer 1'; E. Shabani 35'; Prirsch 50'; Ygor 64', 87'; Mujić 84'	Stadium: Sportclub-Platz

19 July 2019	FC Mauerwerk	1–2	FC Marchfeld Donauauen	Traiskirchen
21:00	F. Mendy 50'	Report	Buljic 40'; Gökçek 90+2'	Stadium: Sport- und Freizeitzentrum Traiskirchen

19 July 2019	SC-ESV Parndorf 1919	1–7	Red Bull Salzburg	Parndorf
21:30	Urgela 71'	Report	Minamino 5'; Haaland 34' (pen.), 73', 89'; Farkas 39', 54'; Daka 47'	Stadium: Heidebodenstadion

20 July 2019	St. Anna	1–0	SC Kalsdorf	Aigen
13:00	Weissenbrunner 8' (o.g.)	Report		Stadium: Bollwerk-Arena

20 July 2019	FC Wolfurt	0–3	Floridsdorfer AC	Wolfurt
18:00		Report	Yilmaz 1'; Sahanek 31'; Prosenik 80'	Stadium: Sportplatz Wolfurt

20 July 2019	ASKÖ Köttmannsdorf	0–9	Austria Wien	Köttmannsdorf
18:30		Report	Prokop 13', 24', 53'; Grünwald 30', 48', 67'; Monschein 45+1'; Edomwonyi 62'; Yateke 83'	Stadium: Sportplatz ASKÖ Köttmannsdorf

20 July 2019	SV Gloggnitz	1–2	SKN St. Pölten	Gloggnitz
18:30	Prenner 57'	Report	Vucenovic 37'; Luxbacher 71'	Stadium: Alpenstadion

20 July 2019	SC Pinkafeld	0–10	SV Mattersburg	Pinkafeld
18:30		Report	Schimandl 2', 86'; Ertlthaler 19'; Jano 45+1'; Kuen 47'; Bürger 50' (pen.), 56', 58'; Kvasina 69'; Halper 89'	Stadium: Sportplatz Pinkafeld

20 July 2019	SC Wiener Viktoria	2–2 (a.e.t.) (5–3 p)	TSV Hartberg	Wien
18:30	Leimhofer 66', 70'	Report	Tadić 29', 77' (pen.)	Stadium: Sportplatz WAF Gruabn
	Penalties
	Arnberger (penalty scored); Rotter (penalty scored); Milosavljević (penalty scored); Bangai (penalty scored); Maier (penalty scored)		(penalty scored) Kainz; (penalty missed) Cancola; (penalty scored) Tadić; (penalty scored) Ostrák

20 July 2019	ATSV Stadl-Paura	0–5	SC Austria Lustenau	Stadl-Paura
19:00		Report	Ronivaldo 33' (pen.), 38' (pen.), 57', 66', 69'	Stadium: Licht & Planung Arena Stadl-Paura

20 July 2019	WSC Hertha Wels	1–0	VfB Hohenems	Wels
19:00	Hartl 9'	Report		Stadium: Mauth Stadion

20 July 2019	FC Kufstein	1–6	SC Rheindorf Altach	Kufstein
19:30	M'Baye 35'	Report	Meilinger 13', 86'; Berisha 38'; Diakité 53', 84'; Jamnig 88'	Stadium: Kufstein-Arena

20 July 2019	SAK Klagenfurt	0–9	Wolfsberger AC	Klagenfurt am Wörthersee
19:30		Report	Weissman 5', 50'; Ritzmaier 19'; Schmerböck 25', 52'; Leitgeb 30'; Schmidt 81'; Niangbo 83'; Schmid 90'	Stadium: Sportplatz Welzenegg

20 July 2019	Union Edelweiß Linz	0–5	FC Admira Wacker Mödling	Linz
20:00		Report	Schmidt 12'; Menig 32', 42'; Starkl 54'; Paintsil 87'	Stadium: Unionplatz

20 July 2019	SV Leobendorf	0–5	FC Blau-Weiß Linz	Leobendorf
20:00		Report	Tursch 57'; Schubert 75', 85', 90'; Edokpolor 79'	Stadium: Sportplatz Leobendorf

20 July 2019	FCM Traiskirchen	1–5	SV Horn	Traiskirchen
20:00	Linhart 50'	Report	Kara 9', 34'; Toth 16'; Faletar 80'; Hausjell 89'	Stadium: Sport- und Freizeitzentrum Traiskirchen

20 July 2019	UVB Vöcklamarkt	2–6	LASK	Vöcklamarkt
20:00	Fröschl 27'; Olivotto 60'	Report	Klauss 4', 74'; Frieser 50', 90+3'; Michorl 56'; Otubanjo 90+1'	Stadium: Sportzentrum Union Volksbank Vöcklamarkt

20 July 2019	SC Neusiedl am See 1919	1–6	Grazer AK	Parndorf
21:30	Wodicka 44'	Report	Rosenberger 20', 49'; Rother 28'; Gantschnig 56'; Schellnegger 60'; Nutz 70'	Stadium: Heidebodenstadion

21 July 2019	SV Allerheiligen	1–9	Rapid Wien	Allerheiligen bei Wildon
18:15	Bernsteiner 79'	Report	Murg 3', 73'; Hofmann 28'; Dibon 38'; Fountas 54'; Knasmüllner 63'; Schwab 67'; Barać 88'; Arase 90+2'	Stadium: Sportanlage Allerheiligen

21 July 2019	SC Schwaz	1–3	Kapfenberger SV	Schwaz
19:00	Kuen 71'	Report	Mensah 19'; Sencar 76'; Račić 81'	Stadium: Silberstadt Arena Schwaz

== Second round ==
Sixteen second round matches were played between 24 and 25 September 2019.

24 September 2019	SC Austria Lustenau	2–1 (a.e.t.)	Floridsdorfer AC	Lustenau
10:45	Feyrer 4'; Ronivaldo 97'	Report	Okungbowa 22'	Stadium: Reichshofstadion

24 September 2019	Grazer AK	1–2	Wacker Innsbruck	Graz
12:45	Valério 73'	Report	Satin 14'; Ibrisimovic 38'	Stadium: Liebenauer Stadium

24 September 2019	ASK Ebreichsdorf	2–1	FC Admira Wacker Mödling	Weigelsdorf
13:00	Peinsipp 15'; Düzgün 26'	Report	Kadlec 90+1'	Stadium: Sportzentrum Ebreichsdorf

24 September 2019	Union Gurten	2–0	SV Horn	Gurten
13:00	Reiter 68'; Wimmleitner 84'	Report		Stadium: Park21-Arena Gurten

24 September 2019	FC Gleisdorf 09	3–0	FC Juniors OÖ	Gleisdorf
13:00	Wagnes 76'; Weiss 90', 90+6' (pen.)	Report		Stadium: Solarstadion der Stadt Gleisdorf

24 September 2019	St. Anna	2–0	Dornbirn 1913	Aigen
13:30	Ramminger 8'; Kobald 55'	Report		Stadium: Bollwerk-Arena

24 September 2019	FC Marchfeld Donauauen	1–2	Kapfenberger SV	Mannsdorf
13:30	Markic 48'	Report	Hernaus 19'; Jeftenić 26' (o.g.)	Stadium: Aulandstadion

24 September 2019	SKU Amstetten	4–1 (a.e.t.)	FC Blau-Weiß Linz	Amstetten
13:30	Maderner 90+4' (pen.), 97' (pen.), 104'; Peham 105+1'	Report	Kreuzriegler 39' (pen.)	Stadium: Ertl Glas Stadion

24 September 2019	SKN St. Pölten	2–1	SV Mattersburg	St. Pölten
14:45	Gartler 56', 61'	Report	Kvasina 71'	Stadium: NV Arena

25 September 2019	SC Wiener Viktoria	1–4	LASK	Wien
12:30	Rotter 65'	Report	Michorl 14'; Goiginger 47', 61'; Raguž 72'	Stadium: Sportplatz WAF Gruabn

25 September 2019	Austria Klagenfurt	2–4 (a.e.t.)	Sturm Graz	Klagenfurt
12:30	Zubak 44'; Markoutz 76' (pen.)	Report	Röcher 6'; Jantscher 85'; Domínguez 101'; Ljubic 111'	Stadium: Karawankenblick Stadion

25 September 2019	WSG Swarovski Tirol	5–2	Austria Wien	Wattens
12:30	Yeboah 10', 55', 59', 70'; Pranter 43'	Report	Monschein 13', 84'	Stadium: Gernot Langes Stadion

25 September 2019	ATSV Wolfsberg	0–6	Wolfsberger AC	Wolfsberg
13:00		Report	Weissman 15', 29', 55'; Baumgartner 75'; Wutte 83' (o.g.); Schmerböck 86'	Stadium: ATSV Arena

25 September 2019	WSC Hertha Wels	1–4	SC Rheindorf Altach	Wels
13:00	Poljanec 83'	Report	Berisha 5'; Tartarotti 37'; Fischer 53'; Gschweidl 85'	Stadium: Mauth Stadion

25 September 2019	Vorwärts Steyr	3–4	Ried	Steyr
13:00	Bibaku 49'; Kirschner 71'; Prada 90+1'	Report	Grüll 2'; Grubeck 15'; Ziegl 78'; Kerhe 90+4'	Stadium: EK Kammerhofer Arena

25 September 2019	Rapid Wien	1–2 (a.e.t.)	Red Bull Salzburg	Wien
14:45	Kitagawa 56'	Report	Szoboszlai 51'; Minamino 120+1'	Stadium: Allianz Stadion

== Third round ==
Eight third round matches were played between 29 and 30 October 2019.

29 October 2019	SKN St. Pölten	1–0	Ried	Sankt Pölten
17:00	Pak 84'	Report		Stadium: NV Arena; Attendance: 2,069; Referee: Andreas Heiß

29 October 2019	St. Anna	0–3	SKU Amstetten	Aigen
18:00		Report	Peham 3', 5'; Schagerl 72'	Stadium: Bollwerk-Arena; Attendance: 600; Referee: Thomas Fröhlacher

29 October 2019	Union Gurten	2–3	SC Austria Lustenau	Gurten
18:00	Kreilinger 56'; Wimmleitner 83' (pen.)	Report	Burghuber 8' (o.g.); Brown 64'; Morys 81'	Stadium: Park21-Arena; Attendance: 850; Referee: Arnes Talić

29 October 2019	FC Gleisdorf 09	1–4 (a.e.t.)	WSG Swarovski Tirol	Gleisdorf
18:00	Pichorner 47'	Report	Katnik 15', 105'; Buchacher 99'; Jurdík 118'	Stadium: Solarstadion der Stadt Gleisdorf; Attendance: 1,000; Referee: Dieter Muckenhammer

29 October 2019	Kapfenberger SV	0–2	Sturm Graz	Kapfenberg
19:30		Report	Despodov 47'; Balaj 90+3'	Stadium: Franz Fekete Stadium; Attendance: 6,450; Referee: René Eisner

30 October 2019	ASK Ebreichsdorf	0–5	Red Bull Salzburg	Ebreichsdorf
17:00		Report	Okugawa 7'; Koïta 13', 75'; Daka 28'; Haaland 86'	Stadium: Sportzentrum Ebreichsdorf; Attendance: 3,100; Referee: Josef Spurny

30 October 2019	Wacker Innsbruck	1–0	Wolfsberger AC	Innsbruck
18:00	Wallner 5'	Report		Stadium: Tivoli; Attendance: 1,736; Referee: Stefan Ebner

30 October 2019	LASK	3–1	SC Rheindorf Altach	Pasching
19:30	Trauner 5'; Frieser 30'; Kobras 40' (o.g.)	Report	Fischer 72'	Stadium: Waldstadion; Attendance: 4,127; Referee: Sebastian Gishamer

== Quarter-finals ==
The quarter-final matches were played between 7 and 9 February 2020.

7 February 2020	SKN St. Pölten	3–3 (a.e.t.) (3–5 p)	Wacker Innsbruck	Sankt Pölten
18:00	Luxbacher 71' (pen.); Klarer 90+1'; Pak 94'	Report	Zaizen 41'; Yıldırım 90+6'; Satin 120' (pen.)	Stadium: NV Arena; Attendance: 2,687; Referee: Christopher Jäger
	Penalties
	Pak (penalty scored); Muhamedbegovic (penalty scored); Messerer (penalty missed); Hofbauer (penalty scored)		(penalty scored) Gründler; (penalty scored) Hupfauf; (penalty scored) Meusburger; (penalty scored) Zaizen; (penalty scored) Satin

8 February 2020	LASK	2–0	Sturm Graz	Pasching
18:00	Klauss 60'; Balić 90+4'	Report		Stadium: Waldstadion; Attendance: 9,153; Referee: Walter Altmann

8 February 2020	SC Austria Lustenau	2–2 (a.e.t.) (5–4 p)	WSG Swarovski Tirol	Lustenau
15:00	Feyrer 63'; Mayer 99'	Report	Dedić 46'; Pranter 105' (pen.)	Stadium: Reichshofstadion; Attendance: 1,800; Referee: Sebastian Gishamer
	Penalties
	Grujčić (penalty scored); Avramović (penalty scored); Feyrer (penalty scored); Tiefenbach (penalty scored); Mayer (penalty scored)		(penalty scored) Grgic; (penalty scored) Adjei; (penalty scored) Pranter; (penalty scored) Soares; (penalty missed) Maierhofer

9 February 2020	SKU Amstetten	0–3	Red Bull Salzburg	Amstetten
18:00		Report	Okugawa 10'; Junuzović 53'; Mwepu 76'	Stadium: Ertl Glas Stadion; Attendance: 2,800; Referee: Christian-Petru Ciochirca

== Semi-finals ==
The semi-final matches were played on 4 and 5 March 2020.

4 March 2020	SC Austria Lustenau	1–0	Wacker Innsbruck	Lustenau
18:00	Ronivaldo 43' (pen.)	Report		Stadium: Reichshofstadion; Attendance: 5,300; Referee: Dieter Muckenhammer

5 March 2020	Red Bull Salzburg	1–0	LASK	Wals-Siezenheim
20:45	Hwang 50'	Report		Stadium: Stadion Wals-Siezenheim; Attendance: 10,021; Referee: Robert Schörgenhofer

== Final ==
29 May 2020
20:45

Red Bull Salzburg	5–0	SC Austria Lustenau
Szoboszlai 19'; Stumberger 21' (o.g.); Okafor 53'; Ashimeru 65'; Koïta 79'	Report

Wörthersee Stadion, Klagenfurt
Attendance: 0
Referee: Dieter Muckenhammer

GK	1	(Austria) Cican Stankovic
RB	5	(Austria) Albert Vallci	(yellow card) 75'
CB	15	(Brazil) André Ramalho
CB	39	(Austria) Maximilian Wöber		(substituted off) 78'
LB	17	(Austria) Andreas Ulmer (c)		(substituted off) 86'
CM	4	(Ghana) Majeed Ashimeru
CM	16	(Austria) Zlatko Junuzović		(substituted off) 68'
RM	77	(Switzerland) Noah Okafor		(substituted off) 68'
LM	14	(Hungary) Dominik Szoboszlai
CF	20	(Zambia) Patson Daka		(substituted off) 78'
CF	9	(South Korea) Hwang Hee-chan
Substitutes:
GK	31	(Brazil) Carlos Miguel Coronel
DF	6	(Cameroon) Jérôme Onguéné		(substituted on) 78'
DF	25	(Austria) Patrick Farkas		(substituted on) 86'
MF	28	(France) Antoine Bernède		(substituted on) 68'
FW	7	(Mali) Sékou Koïta		(substituted on) 68'
FW	8	(Germany) Mërgim Berisha
FW	27	(Germany) Karim Adeyemi		(substituted on) 78'
Manager:
(United States) Jesse Marsch

GK	98	(Austria) Florian Eres
RB	29	(Austria) Michael Lageder
CB	24	(Austria) Sebastian Feyrer
CB	5	(Croatia) Dominik Stumberger	(yellow card) 15'
LB	18	(Austria) Christian Schilling
DM	16	(Austria) Christoph Freitag	(yellow card) 51'
RM	55	(Austria) Thomas Mayer		(substituted off) 55'
CM	33	(Hungary) Daniel Tiefenbach	(yellow card) 38'	(substituted off) 55'
CM	23	(Austria) Pius Grabher		(substituted off) 62'
LM	14	(Austria) Alexander Ranacher
CF	9	(Brazil) Ronivaldo (c)
Substitutes:
GK	77	(Croatia) Marcel Stumberger
DF	26	(Austria) Darijo Grujcic
MF	10	(Austria) Daniel Steinwender		(substituted on) 62'
MF	20	(Brazil) Wallace		(substituted on) 55'
FW	11	(Austria) Lukas Katnik		(substituted on) 55'
FW	22	(Serbia) Bojan Avramović
FW	99	(Costa Rica) Andy Reyes
Manager:
(Austria) Roman Mählich

Match rules

- 90 minutes.
- 30 minutes of extra time if necessary.
- Penalty shoot-out if scores still level.
- Seven named substitutes, of which up to four may be used.

== Top goalscorers ==
Rank	Player	Club	Goals
1	(Brazil) Ronivaldo	SC Austria Lustenau	7
2	(Austria) Daniel Maderner	SKU Amstetten	5
2	(Austria) Dominik Weiss	FC Gleisdorf 09	5
2	(Israel) Shon Weissman	Wolfsberger AC	5
5	(Norway) Erling Haaland	Red Bull Salzburg	4
5	(Austria) Murat Satin	Wacker Innsbruck	4
5	(Ghana) Kelvin Yeboah	WSG Swarovski Tirol	4
5	(Austria) Ertugrul Yıldırım	Wacker Innsbruck	4
9	9 players		3

== See also ==
- 2019–20 Austrian Football Bundesliga
