= 2020 Austrian Cup final =

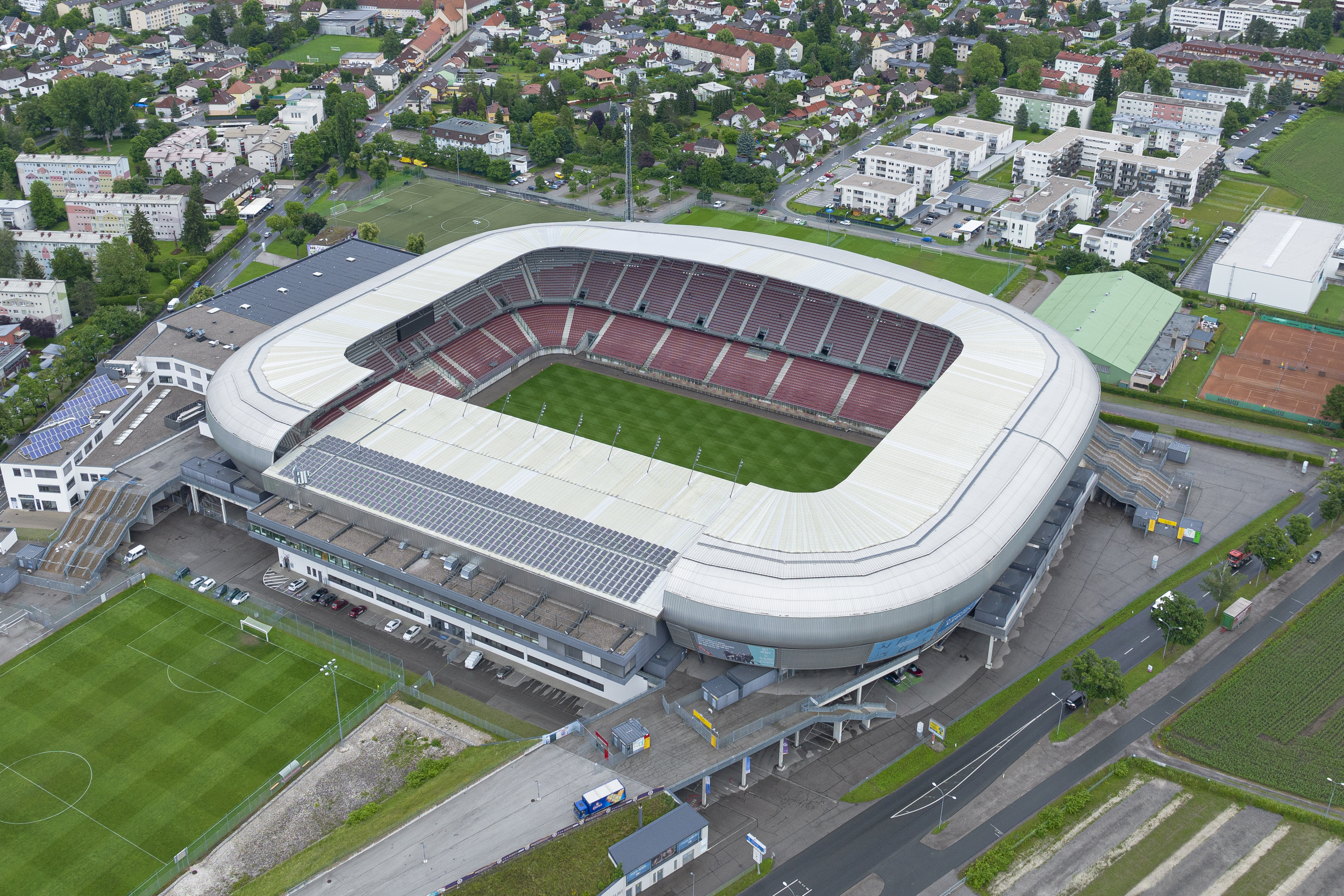
- Wörthersee Stadion hosted the final.
- Event: 2019–20 Austrian Cup
Red Bull Salzburg	Austria Lustenau
5	0
- Date: 29 May 2020
- Venue: Wörthersee Stadion, Klagenfurt
- Referee: Dieter Muckenhammer
- Attendance: 0 (behind-closed-doors)
- Weather: Mostly Cloudy; 59 °F (15 °C); 48% humidity

The 2020 Austrian Cup final was played on 29 May 2020 between FC Red Bull Salzburg and SC Austria Lustenau at Wörthersee Stadion, Klagenfurt, a neutral ground. The final was the culmination of the 2019–20 Austrian Cup, the 89th season of the Austrian Cup.

Red Bull Salzburg won their seventh cup title after defeating Austria Lustenau 5–0, which would have earned them a place in the 2020–21 UEFA Europa League, but they instead qualified for the UEFA Champions League by virtue of their first-place finish in the 2019–20 Austrian Bundesliga.

== Teams ==
Team	Previous finals appearances (bold indicates winners)
SC Austria Lustenau	2 (2011, 2020)
FC Red Bull Salzburg	12 ( (Note: as SV Austria Salzburg)1974, 1980, 1981, 2000, **2012**, **2014**, **2015,** **2016,** **2017,** 2018, **2019**, **2020**)

== Venue ==
Wörthersee Stadion, known as 28 Black Arena for sponsorship purposes, is the home of SK Austria Klagenfurt of the Austrian Football Bundesliga, with a capacity of 30,000.

== Background ==
The Austrian Bundesliga clubs FC Red Bull Salzburg and SC Austria Lustenau contested the final, with the winner earning a place in the 2020–21 UEFA Europa League group stage. Since Red Bull Salzburg qualified for the 2020–21 UEFA Champions League by virtue of their first-place finish in the 2019–20 Austrian Bundesliga, the Europa League group stage place was passed down to 3rd place Wolfsberger AC.

Red Bull Salzburg competed in its twelfth overall final, which was also their seventh consecutive final. Austria Lustenau competed in their second overall final, which was their first since 2011. Austria Lustenau has never won the domestic cup, while Red Bull Salzburg has won it 6 times. The two teams have never met in the Austrian cup final. As Red Bull Salzburg and Austria Lustenau are in different tiers of the Austrian football league system, this is their first match up of the season.

== Route to the final ==
Note: In all results below, the score of the finalist is given first (H: home; A: away).

FC Red Bull Salzburg		Round	SC Austria Lustenau	
Opponent	Result		Opponent	Result
SC-ESV Parndorf 1919	7–1 (A)	First round	ATSV Stadl-Paura	5–0 (A)
SK Rapid Wien	2–1 (A)	Second round	Floridsdorfer AC	2–1 (a.e.t.) (H)
ASK Ebreichsdorf	5–0 (A)	Third round	Union Gurten	3–2 (A)
SKU Amstetten	3–0 (A)	Quarter-finals	WSG Swarovski Tirol	2–2 (a.e.t.) (A) (5–4 p)
LASK	1–0 (H)	Semi-finals	FC Wacker Innsbruck	1–0 (H)

== Match ==
29 May 2020
20:45

Red Bull Salzburg	5–0	Austria Lustenau
Szoboszlai 19'; Stumberger 21' (o.g.); Okafor 53'; Ashimeru 65'; Koïta 79'	Report

Wörthersee Stadion, Klagenfurt
Attendance: 0 (behind-closed-doors)
Referee: Dieter Muckenhammer

GK	1	(Austria) Cican Stankovic
RB	5	(Austria) Albert Vallci	(yellow card) 75'
CB	15	(Brazil) André Ramalho
CB	39	(Austria) Maximilian Wöber		(substituted off) 78'
LB	17	(Austria) Andreas Ulmer (c)		(substituted off) 86'
CM	4	(Ghana) Majeed Ashimeru
CM	16	(Austria) Zlatko Junuzović		(substituted off) 68'
RM	77	(Switzerland) Noah Okafor		(substituted off) 68'
LM	14	(Hungary) Dominik Szoboszlai
CF	20	(Zambia) Patson Daka		(substituted off) 78'
CF	9	(South Korea) Hwang Hee-chan
Substitutes:
GK	31	(Brazil) Carlos Miguel Coronel
DF	6	(Cameroon) Jérôme Onguéné		(substituted on) 78'
DF	25	(Austria) Patrick Farkas		(substituted on) 86'
MF	28	(France) Antoine Bernède		(substituted on) 68'
FW	7	(Mali) Sékou Koïta		(substituted on) 68'
FW	8	(Germany) Mërgim Berisha
FW	27	(Germany) Karim Adeyemi		(substituted on) 78'
Manager:
(United States) Jesse Marsch

GK	98	(Austria) Florian Eres
RB	29	(Austria) Michael Lageder
CB	24	(Austria) Sebastian Feyrer
CB	5	(Croatia) Dominik Stumberger	(yellow card) 15'
LB	18	(Austria) Christian Schilling
DM	16	(Austria) Christoph Freitag	(yellow card) 51'
RM	55	(Austria) Thomas Mayer		(substituted off) 55'
CM	33	(Hungary) Daniel Tiefenbach	(yellow card) 38'	(substituted off) 55'
CM	23	(Austria) Pius Grabher		(substituted off) 62'
LM	14	(Austria) Alexander Ranacher
CF	9	(Brazil) Ronivaldo (c)
Substitutes:
GK	77	(Croatia) Marcel Stumberger
DF	26	(Austria) Darijo Grujcic
MF	10	(Austria) Daniel Steinwender		(substituted on) 62'
MF	20	(Brazil) Wallace		(substituted on) 55'
FW	11	(Austria) Lukas Katnik		(substituted on) 55'
FW	22	(Serbia) Bojan Avramović
FW	99	(Costa Rica) Andy Reyes
Manager:
(Austria) Roman Mählich

Assistant referees:

Stefan Kühr

Stefan Stangl

Fourth official:

Stefan Ebner

**Match rules**
- 90 minutes
- 30 minutes of extra time if necessary
- Penalty shoot-out if scores still level
- Seven named substitutes, of which up to four may be used
