= List of Austrian football transfers winter 2019–20 =

This is a list of Austrian football transfers for the 2019–20 winter transfer window. Only transfers featuring Austrian Football Bundesliga are listed.

== Austrian Football Bundesliga ==
Note: Flags indicate national team as has been defined under FIFA eligibility rules. Players may hold more than one non-FIFA nationality.

=== Red Bull Salzburg ===
In:

No.	Pos.	Nation	Player
77	FW	SUI	Noah Okafor (from (Switzerland) Basel)
—	FW	CIV	Anderson Niangbo (from Liefering, previously on loan at Wolfsberger AC)

Out:

No.	Pos.	Nation	Player
3	DF	SUI	Jasper van der Werff (on loan to (Switzerland) Basel)
11	FW	BIH	Smail Prevljak (on loan to (Belgium) Eupen)
18	FW	JPN	Takumi Minamino (to (England) Liverpool)
29	DF	GER	Kilian Ludewig (on loan to (England) Barnsley)
30	FW	NOR	Erling Haaland (to (Germany) Borussia Dortmund)
34	DF	CRO	Marin Pongračić (to (Germany) VfL Wolfsburg)
—	FW	CIV	Anderson Niangbo (to (Belgium) KAA Gent)

=== LASK ===
In:

No.	Pos.	Nation	Player
32	FW	SEN	Ibrahima Dramé (from (Senegal) Diambars)
34	MF	AUT	Husein Balić (from SKN St. Pölten)

Out:

No.	Pos.	Nation	Player
4	DF	AUT	Emanuel Pogatetz (to Juniors OÖ)
14	FW	NGA	Yusuf Otubanjo (to Ararat-Armenia)
—	MF	BRA	Richard (on loan to Austria Lustenau, previously on loan at Grazer AK)
—	DF	GER	Andriko Smolinski (to (Germany) Hannover 96 II, previously on loan at Juniors OÖ)

=== Wolfsberger AC ===
In:

No.	Pos.	Nation	Player
8	FW	SEN	Cheikhou Dieng (free agent)
22	MF	SRB	Miloš Jojić (on loan from (Turkey) İstanbul Başakşehir)
28	DF	POR	Miguel Vieira (on loan from (Turkey) İstanbul Başakşehir)

Out:

No.	Pos.	Nation	Player
8	MF	AUT	Marcel Ritzmaier (to (England) Barnsley)
21	FW	CIV	Anderson Niangbo (loan return to Liefering)
26	DF	AUT	Michael Sollbauer (to (England) Barnsley)
30	FW	AUT	Amar Hodžić (on loan to Vorwärts Steyr)

=== Austria Wien ===
In:

No.	Pos.	Nation	Player
2	DF	DEN	Andreas Poulsen (on loan from (Germany) Borussia Mönchengladbach)

Out:

No.	Pos.	Nation	Player
15	MF	TUR	Tarkan Serbest (to (Turkey) Kasımpaşa)
26	FW	ISR	Alon Turgeman (on loan to (Poland) Wisła Kraków)

=== Sturm Graz ===
In:

No.	Pos.	Nation	Player
17	MF	AUT	Lukas Jäger (from (Germany) 1. FC Nürnberg)
19	FW	AUT	Kevin Friesenbichler (from (Germany) VfL Osnabrück)

Out:

No.	Pos.	Nation	Player
14	FW	AUT	Markus Pink (to Admira Wacker)
22	MF	AUT	Tobias Koch (on loan to Lafnitz)
26	DF	AUT	Fabian Koch (to WSG Wattens)
38	MF	AUT	Michael John Lema (on loan to TSV Hartberg)

=== SKN St. Pölten ===
In:

No.	Pos.	Nation	Player
7	FW	AUT	Nicolas Meister (on loan from Juniors OÖ)
9	FW	JAM	Cory Burke (on loan from (United States) Philadelphia Union, previously on loan at (Jamaica) Portmore United)
14	DF	AUT	Christoph Klarer (on loan from (England) Southampton U23)
24	MF	AUT	Valentin Lamprecht (from ASV Spratzern)
77	MF	BRA	Alan (free agent)
91	DF	AUT	Stefan Stangl (free agent)
—	DF	GER	Kofi Schulz (from Amstetten)

Out:

No.	Pos.	Nation	Player
7	FW	AUT	René Gartler (to Juniors OÖ)
9	FW	FIN	Roope Riski (to (Finland) HJK Helsinki)
14	MF	AUT	Husein Balić (to LASK)
23	DF	AUT	Manuel Haas (to (Croatia) Inter Zaprešić)
25	DF	AUT	Noah Steiner (retired)
82	GK	AUT	Lukas Wackerle (on loan to Union Innsbruck)

=== Rapid Wien ===
In:

No.	Pos.	Nation	Player
16	MF	SVN	Dejan Petrovič (from (Slovenia) Aluminij)
29	FW	AUT	Ercan Kara (from SV Horn)

Out:

No.	Pos.	Nation	Player
15	MF	AUT	Manuel Martic (to (Croatia) Inter Zaprešić)
27	FW	SEN	Aliou Badji (to (Egypt) Al Ahly)

=== SV Mattersburg ===
In:

No.	Pos.	Nation	Player

Out:

No.	Pos.	Nation	Player
32	DF	AUT	Raffael Behounek (to Wacker Innsbruck)

=== SCR Altach ===
In:

No.	Pos.	Nation	Player
2	DF	GER	Berkay Dabanlı (from (Turkey) Eskişehirspor)
10	MF	GER	Sidney Sam (free agent)
15	MF	SUI	Alain Wiss (from (Switzerland) FC St. Gallen)
22	FW	AUT	Ogulcan Bekar (from Liefering)
29	FW	PAR	Julio Villalba (on loan from (Germany) Borussia Mönchengladbach)

Out:

No.	Pos.	Nation	Player
3	DF	AUT	Leonardo Zottele (on loan to FC Dornbirn)
8	MF	AUT	Matthias Puschl (to SV Lafnitz)
9	FW	AUT	Bernd Gschweidl (to SV Ried)
14	FW	ZAM	Brian Mwila (released)
37	FW	GER	Mërgim Berisha (loan return to Red Bull Salzburg)

=== Admira Wacker ===
In:

No.	Pos.	Nation	Player
13	FW	AUT	Markus Pink (from Sturm Graz)
17	MF	KOR	Kim Jung-min (on loan from Liefering)
25	DF	AUT	Mario Pavelić (on loan from (Croatia) Rijeka, previously on loan at (Norway) Sarpsborg 08)

Out:

No.	Pos.	Nation	Player

=== TSV Hartberg ===
In:

No.	Pos.	Nation	Player
37	MF	AUT	Michael John Lema (on loan from Sturm Graz)

Out:

No.	Pos.	Nation	Player
5	MF	BIH	Tino-Sven Sušić (to (Bosnia and Herzegovina) Sarajevo)
26	DF	AUT	Patrick Obermüller (loan return to Rapid Wien II)

=== WSG Wattens ===
In:

No.	Pos.	Nation	Player
6	MF	GRE	Thanos Petsos (free agent)
20	FW	AUT	Stefan Maierhofer (from (Switzerland) Aarau)
24	DF	AUT	Fabian Koch (from Sturm Graz)
44	DF	BRA	Bruno Soares (from (Malaysia) Johor Darul Ta'zim II)

Out:

No.	Pos.	Nation	Player
11	FW	AUT	Lukas Katnik (to Austria Lustenau)
21	FW	SVK	Milan Jurdík (to Floridsdorfer AC)

== See also ==
- 2019–20 Austrian Football Bundesliga
