= Patrick Gânțe =

Romanian footballer (born 2004)

Personal information
- Full name: Patrick Ioan Gânțe
- Date of birth: 15 February 2004 (age 22)
- Place of birth: Oradea, România
- Height: 1.93 m (6 ft 4 in)
- Position: Centre-forward

Youth career
- –2016: Bihor Oradea
- 2016–2017: CSM Oradea
- 2017–2020: CA Oradea
- 2020-2022: Roma
- 2022–2023: Hartberg

Senior career*
Years	Team	Apps	(Gls)
2017–2020	CA Oradea	12	(8)
2017–2020	Hartberg	0	(0)
2023	→ Lafnitz (loan)	2	(0)
2023	→ Lafnitz II (loan)	9	(4)
2023–2024	Lafnitz	0	(0)
2023–2024	Lafnitz II	7	(3)
2024–2025	Kazincbarcika	8	(0)

International career
2018–2019	Romania U15	4	(3)
2019–2020	Romania U16	2	(0)
2021	Romania U18	1	(0)
- * Club domestic league appearances and goals as of 12 August 2024

Patrick Ioan Gânțe (born 15 February 2004) is a professional footballer who plays as a centre-forward.

== Early life ==
Patrick Gânțe was born in Oradea, started football at Bihor Oradea and also he played for youth academy of Italian club Roma and Austrian club Hartberg. When Patrick was 14, he debuted with goal at senior level in Cupa Romaniei for CA Oradea in a match against Diosig Bihardiószeg.

== Club career ==
=== Lafnitz ===
Gânțe made his professional debut for Lafnitz on 18 March 2023, in a 1–2 Austrian 2. Liga loss to Dornbirn.

== Career statistics ==
=== Club ===
As of match played 21 September 2023.

Appearances and goals by club, season and competition
Club	Season	League			National Cup		Continental		Other		Total	
Club	Season	Division	Apps	Goals	Apps	Goals	Apps	Goals	Apps	Goals	Apps	Goals
Lafnitz II	2022–23	Landesliga Steiermark	9	4	—		—		—		9	4
Lafnitz II	2023–24	Landesliga Steiermark	7	3	—		—		—		7	3
Lafnitz II	Total		16	7	—		—		—		16	7
Lafnitz	2022–23	Austrian 2. Liga	2	0	0	0	—		—		2	0
Lafnitz	2023–24	Austrian 2. Liga	0	0	0	0	—		—		0	0
Lafnitz	Total		2	0	0	0	—		—		2	0
Kazincbarcika	2023–24	Nemzeti Bajnokság II	8	0	—		—		—		8	0
Kazincbarcika	2024–25	Nemzeti Bajnokság II	0	0	0	0	—		—		0	0
Kazincbarcika	Total		8	0	0	0	—		—		8	0
Career total			26	7	0	0	0	0	0	0	26	7
