= 2012–13 FC Wacker Innsbruck season =

Wacker Innsbruck
2012–13 season
- Chairman: Kaspar Plattner
- Manager: Walter Kogler
- Stadium: Tivoli-Neu, Innsbruck, Tyrol
- Bundesliga: 8th
- ÖFB-Cup: Quarter-final
- Highest home attendance: 5.800 (vs. Red Bull Salzburg on 1 September)
- Lowest home attendance: 4.200 (vs. SC Wiener Neustadt on 18 August)

The 2012–13 FC Wacker Innsbruck season was the club's 11th season since the club was reestablished in June 2002.

== Matches and results ==
=== Legend ===
Win Draw Loss

=== Bundesliga ===
==== League results and fixtures ====
Austrian Bundesliga match results
Match	Date	Time	Opponent	Venue	Result F–A	Scorers	Attendance	Ref.
1	21 July 2012	18:30	Rapid Wien	Away	0–4		15,086	
2	29 July 2012	16:00	Admira Wacker Mödling	Home	1–2	Schreter 16'	4,909	
3	5 August 2012	16:00	SV Ried	Away	0–2		4,453	
4	11 August 2012	18:30	SV Mattersburg	Home	2–1	Fernandes 83' Wernitznig 90+2'	4,031	
5	18 August 2012	18:30	SC Wiener Neustadt	Home	2–3	Wernitznig 11', Perstaller 57'	4,200	
6	25 August 2012	18:30	Austria Wien	Away	0–2		7,380	
7	1 September 2012	18:30	Red Bull Salzburg	Home	0–4		5,800	
8	15 September 2012	18:30	Sturm Graz	Away	0–3		10,482	
9	22 September 2012	18:30	Wolfsberger AC	Home	0–1			
10	29 September 2012	18:30	Rapid Wien	Home	0–2			
11	6 October 2012	18:30	Admira Wacker Mödling	Away	1–4			
12	20 October 2012	18:30	SV Ried	Home	1–0			
13	27 October 2012	18:30	SV Mattersburg	Away	2–1			
14	3 November 2012	16:00	SC Wiener Neustadt	Away	1–0			
15	10 November 2012	18:30	Austria Wien	Home	0–3			
16	18 November 2012	16:00	Red Bull Salzburg	Away	0–2			
17	24 November 2012	16:00	Sturm Graz	Home	0–3 (Note: Sturm Graz were awarded a 3–0 win due to behaviour of Wacker Innsbruck supporters.)		6,719	
18	1 December 2012	16:00	Wolfsberger AC	Away	2–2			
19	9 December 2012	16:00	Rapid Wien	Away	1–2			
20	15 December 2012	18:30	Admira Wacker Mödling	Home	3–1			
21	16 February 2013	16:00	SV Ried	Away	0–3			
22	23 February 2013	16:00	SV Mattersburg	Home	2–0			
23	27 February 2013	20:30	SC Wiener Neustadt	Home	1–0			
24	2 March 2013	18:30	Austria Wien	Away	0–4			
25	10 March 2013	16:00	Red Bull Salzburg	Home	2–3			
26	16 March 2013	18:30	Sturm Graz	Away	2–3			
27	30 March 2013	18:30	Wolfsberger AC	Home	2–3			
28	6 April 2013	16:00	Rapid Wien	Home	1–1			
29	13 April 2013	18:30	Admira Wacker Mödling	Away	3–4			
30	20 April 2013	18:30	SV Ried	Home	2–0			
31	27 April 2013	18:30	SV Mattersburg	Away	2–1			
32	4 May 2013	18:30	SC Wiener Neustadt	Away	2–2			
33	11 May 2013	18:30	Austria Wien	Home	0–3			
34	18 May 2013	18:30	Red Bull Salzburg	Away	1–3			
35	22 May 2013	20:30	Sturm Graz	Home	2–1			
36	26 May 2013	16:00	Wolfsberger AC	Away	3–2			

==== League table ====
===== Overall league table =====
Pos	Team	Pld	W	D	L	GF	GA	GD	Pts	Qualification or relegation
6	SV Ried	36	13	7	16	60	59	+1	46	
7	Wiener Neustadt	36	9	9	18	32	60	−28	36	
8	Wacker Innsbruck	36	11	3	22	41	75	−34	36	
9	Admira Wacker Mödling	36	9	8	19	47	68	−21	35	
10	Mattersburg (R)	36	9	8	19	36	67	−31	35	Relegation to Austrian First Football League

Source: weltfussball.de (in German)
Rules for classification: 1) points; 2) goal difference; 3) number of goals scored.
(R) Relegated

=== ÖFB-Cup ===
ÖFB-Cup match details
Round	Date	Time	Opponent	Venue	Result F–A	Scorers	Attendance	Ref.
First round	13 July 2012	19:00	FC Gratkorn	Away	0–0 (a.e.t.) (5–4 p)	—	800	
Second round	25 September 2012	19:00	SC Sollenau	Away	5–1 (a.e.t.)	Saurer 14', Wallner 91', 93', 104', Fröschl 111'	809	
Third round	30 October 2012	18:00	SK Sturm Graz	Away	2–1	Perstaller 60', Wallner 83'	3,217	
Quarter-final	16 April 2013	19:30	Red Bull Salzburg	Home	0–3		1,512	
