= Domagoj Bešlić =

Croatian footballer

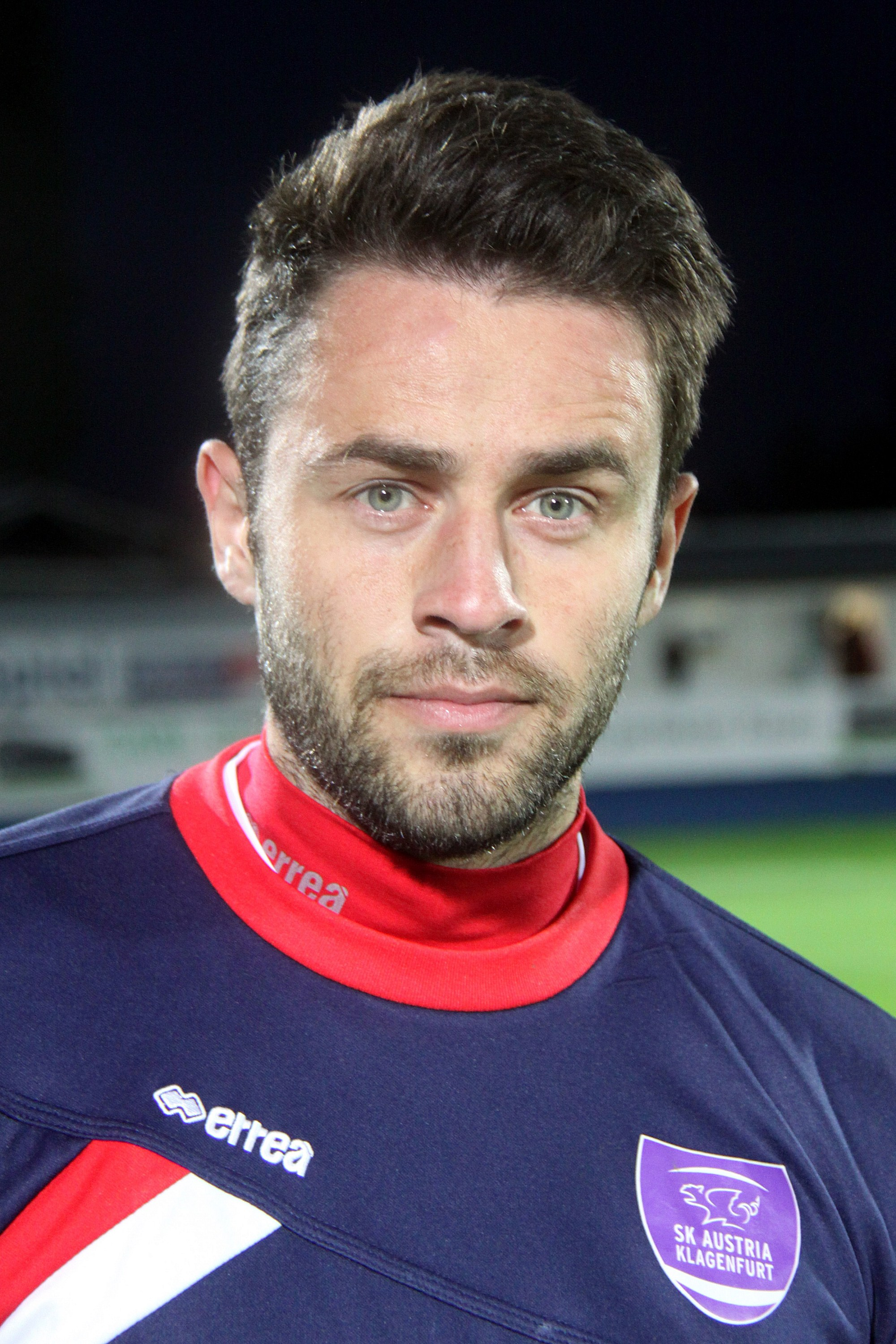
- Bešlić in 2015

Personal information
- Date of birth: 1 December 1990 (age 35)
- Place of birth: Zagreb, SR Croatia, SFR Yugoslavia
- Position: Forward

Youth career
- 2002–2006: Ponikve
- 2007–2008: Samobor
- 2008–2009: Dinamo Zagreb

Senior career*
Years	Team	Apps	(Gls)
2009	Špansko	14	(4)
2010	Vinogradar	1	(0)
2010–2011	Hamilton Croatia		
2011	Vrapče	14	(7)
2011–2012	Sesvete	9	(1)
2012	Vrapče	9	(5)
2012–2015	Lafnitz	61	(35)
2015–2016	Austria Klagenfurt	16	(1)
2016	→ TSV Hartberg (loan)	14	(7)
2016–2018	SK Fürstenfeld	32	(30)
2018–2019	Lafnitz II	20	(11)
2018–2019	Lafnitz	22	(5)
2019–2022	SK Fürstenfeld	41	(21)
2023–2024	SV Gleinstätten		
2024	SV Strass		
2025	SK Fürstenfeld	14	(3)
- * Club domestic league appearances and goals

Domagoj Bešlić (born 1 December 1990 in Zagreb) is a Croatian former football player who played as a forward.

== Club career ==
In 2010, he played in the Canadian Soccer League with Brantford Galaxy. He would later play with league rivals Hamilton Croatia for the remainder of the season. He returned to Europe in 2011 to play in the Croatian Second Football League with NK Sesvete. In 2015, he played in the Austria First League with SK Austria Klagenfurt. The following season, he played with TSV Hartberg.

In 2016, he moved to SC Fürstenfeld. After a season with Fürstenfeld, he returned to SV Lafnitz in the winter of 2017. In 2019, he departed from Lafnitz and returned to SC Fürstenfeld. In the winter of 2023, he signed a contract with SV Gleinstätten. Bešlić joined SV Strass in January 2024. His stint with Strass was short-lived as he returned to Fürstenfeld in 2025.

== Honours ==
SV Lafnitz

- Austrian Regionalliga Central: 2017-18

Hamilton Croatia

- CSL Championship runner-up: 2010
