= Giannis Karakoutis =

Greek footballer

Personal information
- Full name: Ioannis Karakoutis
- Date of birth: 2 February 2003 (age 23)
- Place of birth: Thessaloniki, Greece
- Height: 1.82 m (6 ft 0 in)
- Positions: Winger; left back

Team information
- Current team: SV Lafnitz
- Number: 19

Youth career
- 2013–2020: PAOK
- 2020–2022: Olympiacos

Senior career*
Years	Team	Apps	(Gls)
2022–2024	Olympiacos B	30	(0)
2024	Doxa Katokopias	6	(0)
2025	SV Horn	7	(0)
2025–2026	Kampaniakos	13	(0)
2026–	SV Lafnitz	15	(0)

International career^{‡}
2019–2020	Greece U17	12	(2)
2021	Greece U19	2	(0)
- * Club domestic league appearances and goals as of 22 August 2026 ‡ National team caps and goals as of 16 November 2021

Giannis Karakoutis (Greek: Γιάννης Καράκουτης; born 2 February 2003) is a Greek professional footballer who plays as a winger for Austrian club SV Lafnitz.
