= Christoph Halper =

Austrian footballer

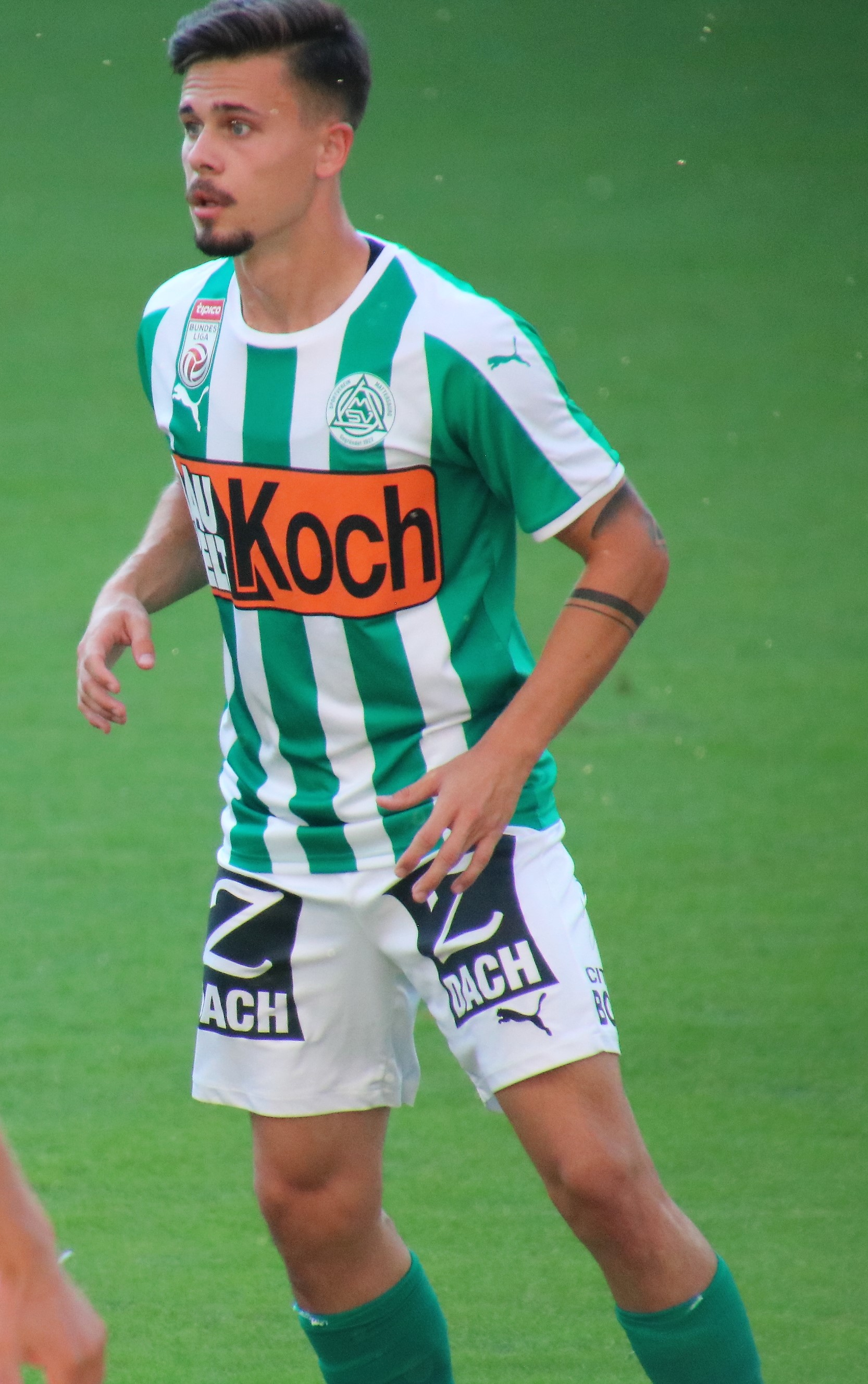

Personal information
- Date of birth: 21 May 1998 (age 28)
- Place of birth: Austria
- Height: 1.69 m (5 ft 7 in)
- Position: Midfielder

Team information
- Current team: SV Oberwart
- Number: 14

Youth career
- 2004–2013: ASK Oberdorf
- 2014–2016: FC Red Bull Salzburg

Senior career*
Years	Team	Apps	(Gls)
2014	SV Stegersbach	8	(0)
2016–2019	SV Mattersburg II	66	(35)
2018–2020	SV Mattersburg	31	(2)
2020–2021	SKN St. Pölten	28	(1)
2022–2023	SV Lafnitz	36	(3)
2023–2024	DSV Leoben	18	(0)
2023	DSV Leoben II	1	(0)
2024–	SV Oberwart	44	(9)

International career^{‡}
2019–2020	Austria U21	4	(0)
- * Club domestic league appearances and goals as of 28 June 2026 ‡ National team caps and goals as of 8 September 2020

Christoph Halper (born 21 May 1998) is an Austrian professional footballer who plays for SV Oberwart.

== Club career ==
On 12 August 2020, he signed a two-year contract with SKN St. Pölten.

Halper signed with SV Lafnitz on 28 December 2021.

On 14 July 2023, Halper signed a contract with DSV Leoben.

On 30 June 2024, Halper joined SV Oberwart.
