= Markus Wallner (footballer) =

Austrian association footballer

Personal information
- Date of birth: 27 October 1996 (age 30)
- Place of birth: Salzburg, Austria
- Height: 1.84 m (6 ft 0 in)
- Position: Winger

Youth career
- 2003–2006: USK Obertrum
- 2006–2013: Red Bull Salzburg
- 2013: Austria Wien

Senior career*
Years	Team	Apps	(Gls)
2013–2014	Grödig II	19	(13)
2014–2016	Austria Salzburg	24	(2)
2016–2017	Grödig	23	(6)
2017–2019	Anif	44	(20)
2019	→ Wacker Innsbruck II (loan)	15	(6)
2019–2021	Wacker Innsbruck	51	(7)
2021–2022	Tirol II	5	(0)
2021–2022	Tirol	18	(0)
2022–2023	Horn	24	(0)
2023	ASKÖ Oedt	8	(2)
- * Club domestic league appearances and goals as of 10 November 2023

Markus Wallner (born 27 October 1996) is an Austrian professional footballer who plays as a Winger or Midfielder and plays for SK Vorwärts Steyr.

== Career ==
Wallner is a product of the youth academies of USK Obertrum, Red Bull Salzburg and Austria Wien. He began his career with Grödig II in 2013, before moving to Austria Salzburg the following year. in 2016, he returned to Grödig as a senior player. He transferred to Anif in the summer of 2017, and joined Wacker Innsbruck II on loan with an option to buy on 7 February 2019. After his strong performance in his loan, he was purchased by Wacker Innsbruck and was part of their senior squad. On 30 June 2021, he transferred to Tirol in the Austrian Football Bundesliga. He moved to Horn on 9 June 2022.

On 1 December 2023, Wallner committed to joining SV Friedburg in the OÖ Liga in January 2024.
