= Michael John Lema =

Austrian footballer (born 1999)

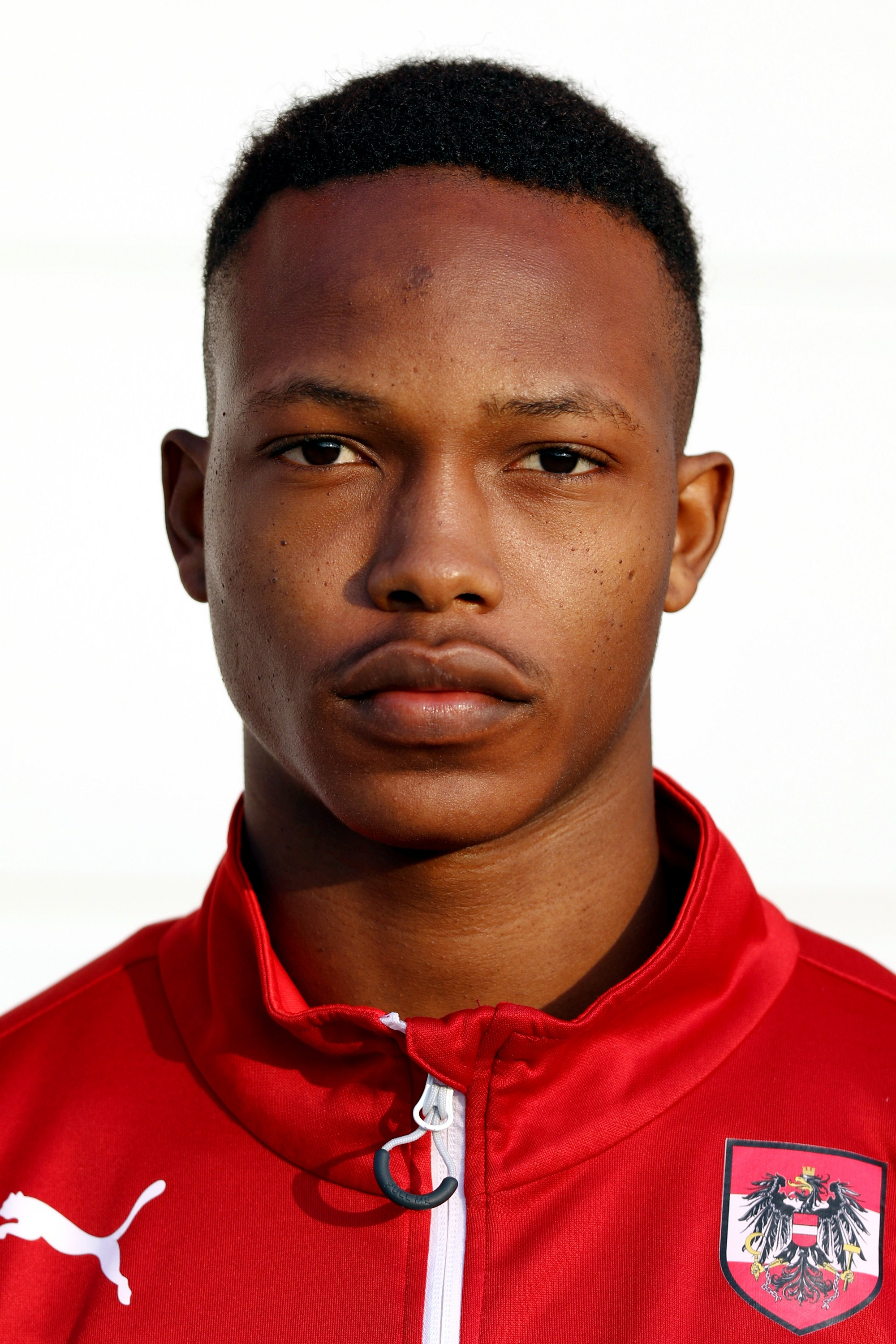
- Lema with Austria U18 in 2018

Personal information
- Date of birth: 3 April 1999 (age 27)
- Place of birth: Itigi, Tanzania
- Height: 1.71 m (5 ft 7 in)
- Position: Wide midfielder

Team information
- Current team: Lafnitz
- Number: 7

Youth career
- 2008–2012: SV Dobernik Tristach
- 2012–2013: Rapid Lienz
- 2013–2018: Sturm Graz

Senior career*
Years	Team	Apps	(Gls)
2016–2018	Sturm Graz II	47	(23)
2018–2021	Sturm Graz	24	(3)
2020–2021	→ TSV Hartberg (loan)	2	(0)
2021–2022	TSV Hartberg	6	(0)
2022	Lafnitz	7	(0)
2023–2024	DSV Leoben	21	(6)
2024–2025	SV Wacker Burghausen	40	(7)
2025–	Lafnitz	25	(3)

International career^{‡}
2017	Austria U18	1	(0)
2017	Austria U19	3	(1)
2019	Austria U20	1	(1)
2019	Austria U21	4	(1)
- * Club domestic league appearances and goals as of 27 June 2026 ‡ National team caps and goals as of 21:18, 2 June 2020 (UTC)

Michael John Lema (born 3 April 1999) is a professional footballer who plays as a wide midfielder for Austrian Regionalliga Central club Lafnitz. Born in Tanzania, Lema was a youth international for Austria.

== Club career ==
On 21 March 2018, Lema signed his first professional contract with Sturm Graz. Lema made his professional debut for Sturm Graz in a 0–0 Austrian Football Bundesliga tie with Rheindorf Altach on 27 May 2018. In December 2019 it was confirmed, that Lema would join TSV Hartberg on loan from January 2020 until the end of the season.

At the end of the 2020–21 season, he moved to Hartberg on a permanent basis.

On 8 February 2022, Lema signed with Lafnitz.

== International career ==
Lema was born in Tanzania, and in 2008 was sponsored to move to Austria. He is a youth international for Austria, but has expressed an interest in representing the Tanzania national football team.
