= Elvin Ibrisimovic =

Austrian footballer

Personal information
- Date of birth: 19 April 1999 (age 27)
- Place of birth: Bregenz, Austria
- Height: 1.86 m (6 ft 1 in)
- Position: Forward

Youth career
- 2006–2016: Bregenz

Senior career*
Years	Team	Apps	(Gls)
2016–2017	Bregenz	29	(12)
2017–2018	Hard	29	(15)
2018–2020	Wacker Innsbruck II	16	(7)
2019–2020	Wacker Innsbruck	25	(2)
2020–2024	Vaduz	14	(1)
2022–2023	→ Dornbirn (loan)	11	(1)

International career
2019	Austria U20	1	(0)
- * Club domestic league appearances and goals

Elvin Ibrisimovic (born 19 April 1999) is an Austrian former professional footballer who played as a forward.

== Career ==
A youth product of Bregenz, Ibrisimovic started his career with the club before joining FC Hard for the 2017–18 season. He moved to Wacker Innsbruck in the summer of 2018. Ibrisimovic made his professional debut with Wacker Innsbruck II in a 0–0 Austrian 2. Liga tie with SKU Amstetten on 5 August 2018.

He transferred to FC Vaduz in the Swiss Super League on 22 December 2020. Due to a series of knee injuries, which finally also required surgery, he only managed to play a total 19 games for Vaduz. On 30 April 2024, the club announced his retirement from professional football due to this persistent injury at only 25 years old.
