= Christopher Bibaku =

French footballer (born 1995)

Personal information
- Date of birth: 13 December 1995 (age 30)
- Place of birth: France
- Height: 1.90 m (6 ft 3 in)
- Position: Forward

Team information
- Current team: SV Rot-Weiss Wittlich
- Number: 10

Senior career*
Years	Team	Apps	(Gls)
–2018	Ailly-Sur-Somme		
2018	Lokomotiva Petrovice		
2018–2019	MFK Havířov		
2019	WSC Hertha Wels	13	(5)
2019–2020	Vorwärts Steyr	24	(1)
2020	AC Kajaani	12	(5)
2021	Mosta	0	(0)
2021	→ Naxxar Lions (loan)	3	(0)
2021–2022	Eintracht Trier	33	(10)
2022–2023	VFC Plauen	25	(10)
2023–2024	FC Eilenburg	26	(9)
2024–2025	Wacker Burghausen	21	(3)
2025–	SV Rot-Weiss Wittlich	0	(0)
- * Club domestic league appearances and goals as of 15:27, 28 June 2025 (UTC)

Christopher Bibaku (born 13 December 1995) is a French professional footballer who plays as a forward for German club SV Rot-Weiss Wittlich in Regionalliga Bayern.

== Career ==
Before the second half of the 2017–18 season, Bibaku signed for Czech fourth division side Lokomotiva Petrovice.

Before the second half of the 2018–19 season, he signed for Hertha Wels in the Austrian third division after training with Austrian fifth division and fourth division clubs.

In 2019, Bibaku signed for Vorwärts Steyr in the Austrian 2. Liga, where he made 26 appearances and scored three goals across all competitions. On 19 July 2019, he scored on his debut for Vorwärts Steyr during a 3–2 win over Bad Gleichenberg in the Austrian Cup.

In 2020, he signed for Finnish team AC Kajaani.

Before the second half of the 2020–21 season, Bibaku signed for Mosta in the Maltese top flight. After that, he was sent on loan to Maltese second division outfit Naxxar Lions.

Bibaku moved to Oberliga Rheinland-Pfalz/Saar club Eintracht Trier in July 2021.

== Career statistics ==
As of 10 July 2021

Appearances and goals by club, season and competition
Club	Season	League			Cup		Total	
Club	Season	Division	Apps	Goals	Apps	Goals	Apps	Goals
Hertha Wels	2018–19	Austrian Regionalliga	13	5	0	0	13	5
Vorwärts Steyr	2019–20	Austrian Football Second League	24	1	2	2	26	3
AC Kajaani	2020	Ykkönen	12	5	0	0	12	5
Naxxar Lions (loan)	2020–21	Maltese Challenge League	3	0	2	2	5	2
Career total			52	11	4	4	56	15
