= Benjamin Pranter =

Austrian footballer

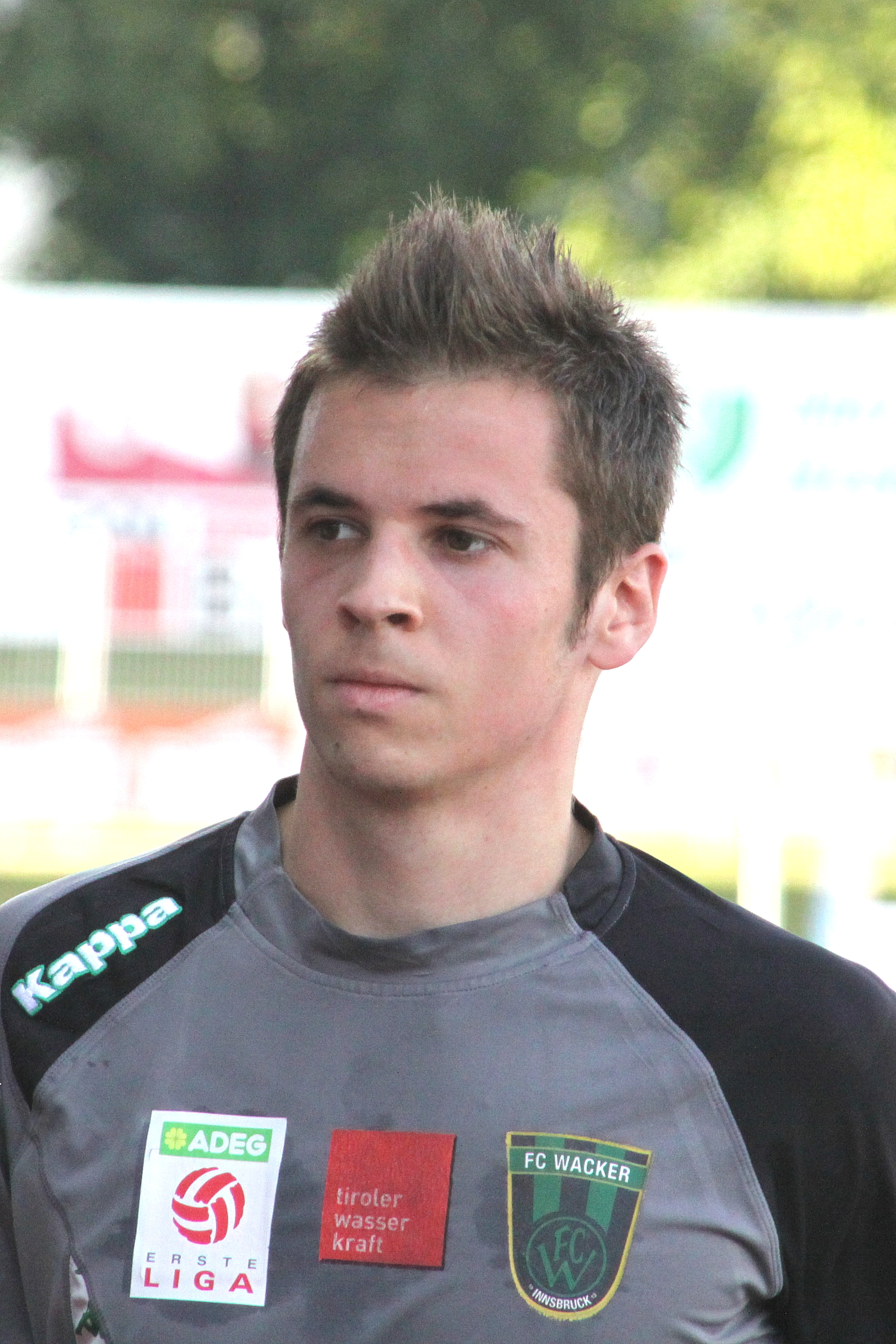

Personal information
- Date of birth: 22 September 1989 (age 37)
- Place of birth: Völs, Austria
- Height: 1.81 m (5 ft 11 in)
- Position: Midfielder

Team information
- Current team: SC Schwaz
- Number: 21

Youth career
- 1995–2003: SV Völs
- 2003–2009: AKA Tirol

Senior career*
Years	Team	Apps	(Gls)
2009	WSG Wattens	14	(3)
2009–2011	Wacker Innsbruck II	17	(7)
2009–2011	Wacker Innsbruck	16	(3)
2011–2021	WSG Swarovski Tirol	259	(79)
2021–	SC Schwaz	5	(2)

International career
2006	Austria U-18	1	(0)
2007	Austria U-19	6	(2)
2009	Austria U-20	1	(0)
- * Club domestic league appearances and goals as of 12 September 2021

Benjamin Pranter (born 22 September 1989) is an Austrian footballer who plays for SC Schwaz.

== Club career ==
On 18 July 2021, he joined SC Schwaz in the third-tier Regionalliga Tirol.
