= Dominik Rotter =

Austrian footballer

Personal information
- Date of birth: 8 July 1990 (age 36)
- Place of birth: Vienna, Austria
- Height: 1.93 m (6 ft 4 in)
- Position: Forward

Team information
- Current team: SC Wiener Viktoria

Youth career
- –2006: SK Rapid Wien
- 2006–2007: 1. Simmeringer SC
- 2007–2008: FC Admira Wacker Mödling

Senior career*
Years	Team	Apps	(Gls)
2008–2010	1. Simmeringer SC		
2010	Arminia Bielefeld	4	(0)
2010	Arminia Bielefeld II	3	(0)
2011	SC Austria Lustenau	17	(3)
2011–2016	Vienna	107	(5)
2016–	SC Wiener Viktoria	0	(0)
- * Club domestic league appearances and goals as of 7 July 2016

Dominik Rotter (born 8 July 1990) is an Austrian footballer.

On 4 May 2019, he scored 12 goals for SC Wiener Viktoria when the team beat FV Wien Floridsdorf 13:0.
