= Christoph Messerer =

Austrian footballer (born 2001)

Personal information
- Date of birth: 10 November 2001 (age 25)
- Place of birth: Neulengbach, Austria
- Position: Midfielder

Team information
- Current team: SKN St. Pölten
- Number: 8

Youth career
- 2009–2015: SV Neulengbach
- 2015–2019: St. Pölten

Senior career*
Years	Team	Apps	(Gls)
2018–2019	SKN St. Pölten II	11	(3)
2019–	SKN St. Pölten	127	(6)
2021	→ SV Horn (loan)	16	(0)

International career
2020	Austria U19	3	(0)
- * Club domestic league appearances and goals as of 17 May 2026

Christoph Messerer (born 10 November 2001) is an Austrian professional footballer who plays for 2. Liga club SKN St. Pölten.

== Club career ==
He made his Austrian Football Bundesliga debut for SKN St. Pölten on 28 September 2019 in a game against LASK.

After only making a brief appearance in the Austrian Cup in the first half of the 2020–21 season, he was sent on loan to 2. Liga club SV Horn in January 2021. By the end of the loan, he had made 16 appearances in the second division for the club. Ahead of the 2021–22 season he returned to SKN, who had suffered relegation the season before.
