= Daniel Račić =

Serbian footballer

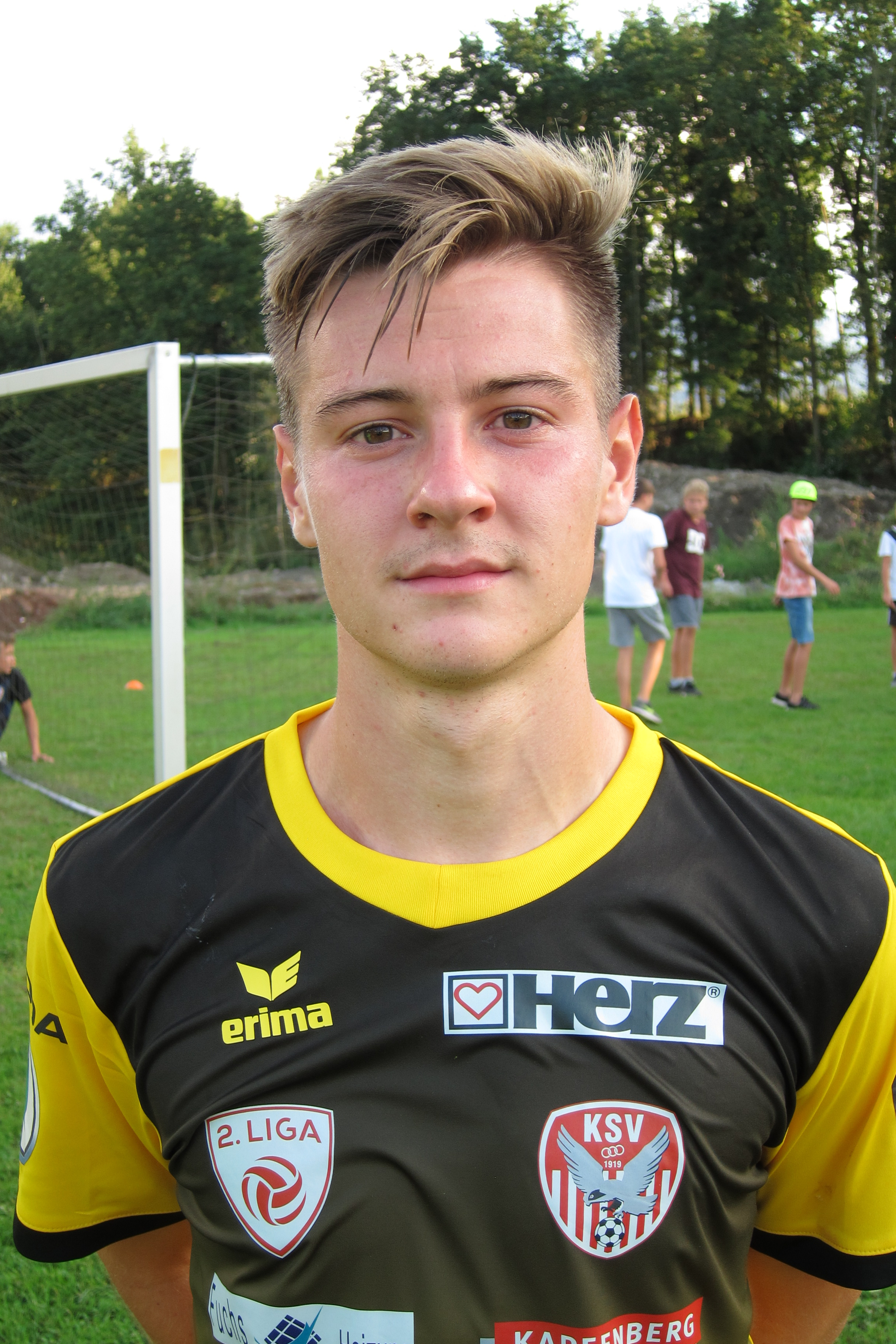

Personal information
- Date of birth: 19 September 1997 (age 29)
- Place of birth: Bruck an der Mur, Austria
- Height: 1.70 m (5 ft 7 in)
- Position: Midfielder

Team information
- Current team: WSC Hertha Wels
- Number: 8

Youth career
- 2013–2015: SV Kapfenberg

Senior career*
Years	Team	Apps	(Gls)
2015–2016	Kapfenberger SV II	31	(2)
2016–2020	Kapfenberger SV	53	(4)
2020–	WSC Hertha Wels	11	(2)
- * Club domestic league appearances and goals as of 19:54, 9 February 2021 (UTC)

Daniel Račić (born 19 September 1997) is an Austrian footballer who plays for WSC Hertha Wels.
