= Landesliga Steiermark =

- Country: Austria
- Confederation: Austrian Football Association
- Number of clubs: 16
- Level on pyramid: 4
- Promotion to: Austrian Regional League Central
- Relegation to: Oberliga
- Current champions: ASK Voitsberg (2022–23)
- Website: https://www.stfv.at/stfv/Bewerb/215889?Landesliga

The Landesliga Steiermark is the football division of the Austrian state of Styria. It is the fourth highest soccer league in Austria.

== Mode ==
The divisions championship is made up of 16 teams. The championship is held in a home round and away round, both with 15 match days. The games are determined through a random draw prior to the start of the first round. The championship season consists of 30 game days.

After finishing the championship, the first placed team (champion) is entitled to promotion to the third-class Austrian Regional League Central. At the end of the championship season, as many lower ranking teams leave the Landesliga division that with regard to Styrian teams leaving the Austrian Regional League Central and Styrian top ranking teams moving up from the Oberliga divisions there are 16 teams in the Landesliga Steiermark. The number of teams that move from the Landesliga Steiermark to the Styrian Oberliga divisions varies because of this to three and four teams.

== 2023–24 member clubs ==
- SC Bruck/Mur
- UFC Fehring
- SV Frauental
- SK Fürstenfeld
- TSV Hartberg Amateure
- TuS Heiligenkreuz
- Ilzer SV
- SC Kalsdorf
- ASK Köflach
- Lafnitz Amateure
- SV Lebring
- FC Schladming
- SV Tillmitsch
- FC Union Gamlitz
- SV Union Gnas
- SV Wildon
Location of teams in 2023–24 Landesliga Steiermark
