= Sebastian Feyrer =

Austrian footballer

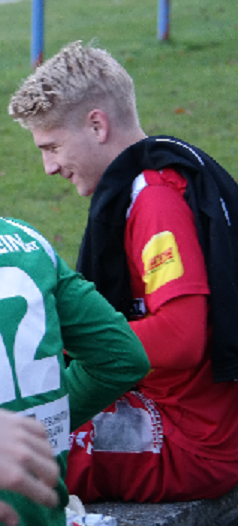
- Feyrer with Kapfenberger SV II in 2016

Personal information
- Date of birth: 4 March 1997 (age 29)
- Place of birth: Leoben, Austria
- Height: 1.86 m (6 ft 1 in)
- Position: Centre-back

Team information
- Current team: FC Hertha Wels
- Number: 4

Youth career
- 2001–2010: ESV St. Michael
- 2010: AKA HIB Liebenau
- 2010–2016: Sturm Graz

Senior career*
Years	Team	Apps	(Gls)
2014–2016	Sturm Graz II	21	(1)
2017–2019	Kapfenberger SV	56	(6)
2019–2021	Austria Lustenau	32	(2)
2021–2025	SV Lafnitz	95	(11)
2025–	FC Hertha Wels	27	(1)

International career^{‡}
2013	Austria U16	3	(0)
- * Club domestic league appearances and goals as of 17 May 2026 ‡ National team caps and goals as of 23 May 2013

Sebastian Feyrer (born 4 March 1997) is an Austrian professional footballer who plays as a centre-back for FC Hertha Wels.

== Club career ==
He made his Austrian Football First League debut for Kapfenberger SV on 10 March 2017 in a game against WSG Wattens.

On 16 June 2025, Feyrer signed for FC Hertha Wels.
