= Thomas Mayer (footballer, born 1995) =

Austrian footballer

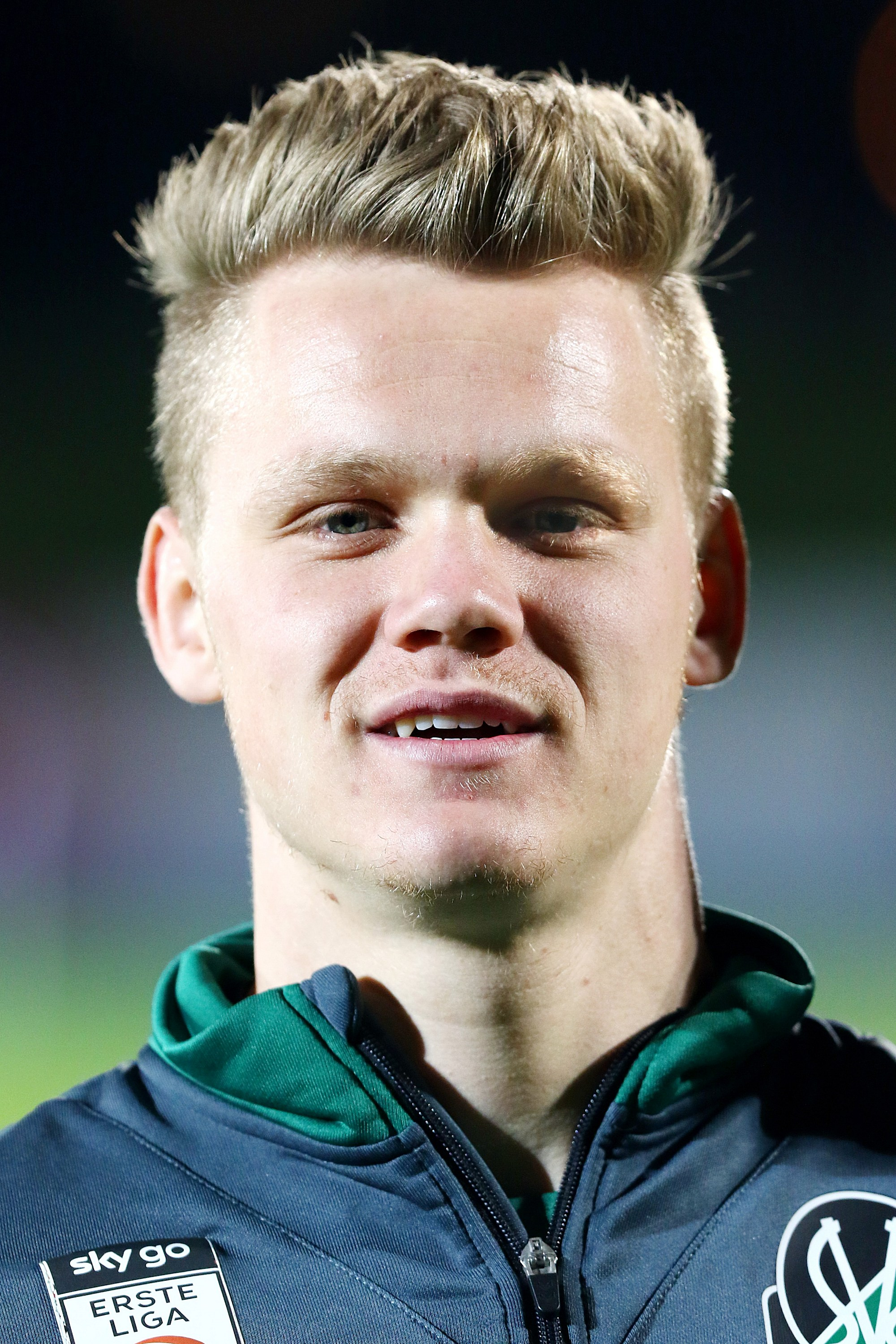

Personal information
- Full name: Thomas Wilfried Mayer
- Date of birth: 23 August 1995 (age 31)
- Place of birth: Linz, Austria
- Height: 1.71 m (5 ft 7 in)
- Position: Winger

Team information
- Current team: SKU Amstetten
- Number: 16

Youth career
- 2001–2009: SC Schwanenstadt
- 2009–2011: LASK Linz
- 2011–2012: VfB Stuttgart

Senior career*
Years	Team	Apps	(Gls)
2012–2013	SK Rapid Wien II	13	(2)
2013–2014	FC Pasching	11	(0)
2014–2016	FC Liefering	0	(0)
2014–2016	→ LASK Linz Juniors (loan)	63	(12)
2016	→ LASK Linz (loan)	4	(0)
2016–2019	LASK Linz	26	(2)
2016–2017	→ LASK Linz Juniors	6	(1)
2017–2019	→ SV Ried (loan)	47	(8)
2019–2020	Austria Lustenau	29	(6)
2020–2021	Hull City	6	(0)
2021–2023	SKU Amstetten	54	(7)
2023–2024	Grazer AK	25	(1)
2024–	SKU Amstetten	11	(2)

International career
2010	Austria U16	2	(1)
2011	Austria U17	3	(0)
- * Club domestic league appearances and goals as of 25 October 2024

Thomas Wilfried Mayer (born 23 August 1995) is an Austrian footballer who plays as a winger for SKU Amstetten.

== Career ==
On 14 September 2020, Mayer joined League One side Hull City on a two-year deal. On 16 August 2021, Mayer was released from his contract by Hull City and moved to SKU Amstetten.

== Honours ==
Hull City

- EFL League One Champions 2020–21
