= Dominik Štumberger =

Croatian footballer

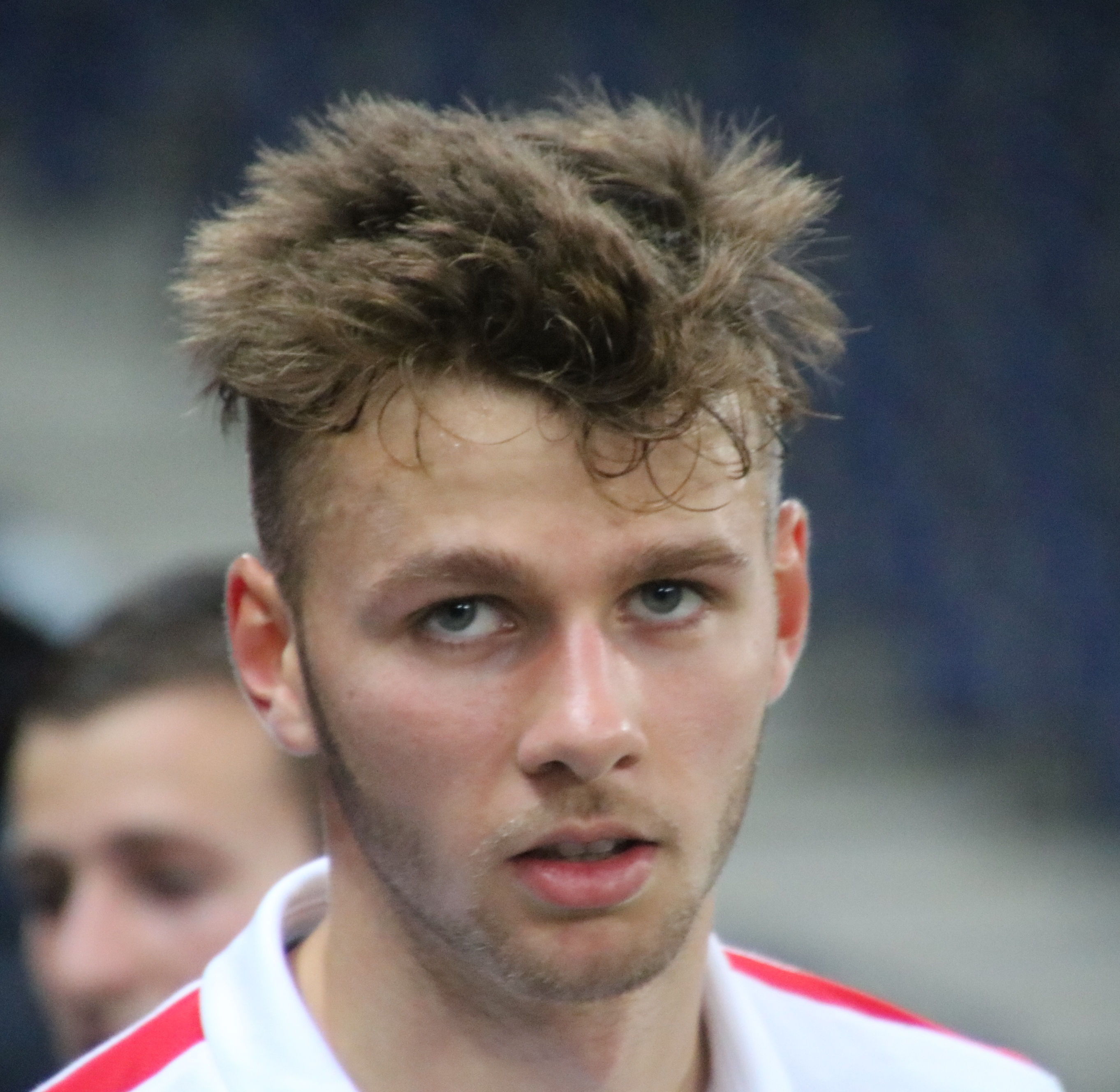

Personal information
- Date of birth: 17 April 1999 (age 27)
- Place of birth: Graz, Austria
- Height: 1.83 m (6 ft 0 in)
- Position: Midfielder

Team information
- Current team: ASK Voitsberg
- Number: 18

Youth career
- GSV Wacker
- 2006–2009: Grazer AK
- 2009–2014: Sturm Graz
- 2014–2018: Red Bull Salzburg

Senior career*
Years	Team	Apps	(Gls)
2017–2019	FC Liefering	28	(5)
2019–2021	Austria Lustenau	25	(0)
2021–2024	WSG Tirol	47	(1)
2025–	ASK Voitsberg	8	(0)

International career
2015–2016	Austria U17	5	(0)
2018	Croatia U20	2	(0)
- * Club domestic league appearances and goals as of 27 June 2026

Dominik Štumberger (born 17 April 1999) is a professional footballer who plays as a midfielder for ASK Voitsberg. Born in Austria, he has most recently represented Croatia at youth level.

== Club career ==
On 14 July 2021, he signed with WSG Tirol.
