= Christoph Freitag =

Austrian footballer

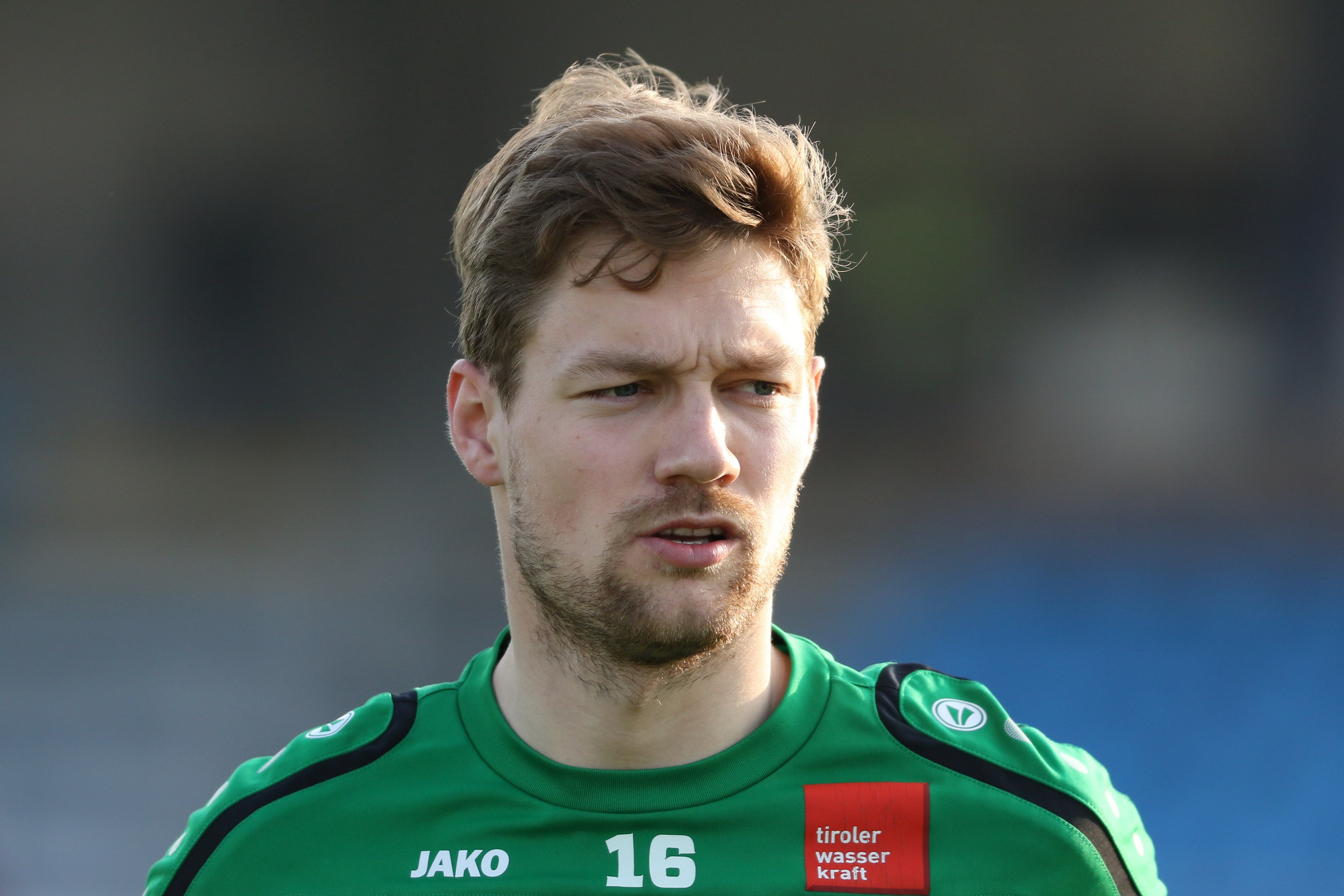
- Freitag in 2016

Personal information
- Date of birth: 21 January 1990 (age 36)
- Place of birth: Judenburg, Austria
- Height: 1.84 m (6 ft 0 in)
- Position: Midfielder

Team information
- Current team: Vorwärts Steyr
- Number: 8

Senior career*
Years	Team	Apps	(Gls)
2008–2011	Austria Wein II	64	(10)
2011–2012	FC Lustenau 07	33	(3)
2012–2015	Wiener Neustadt	62	(2)
2015–2019	Wacker Innsbruck	88	(10)
2019–2021	Austria Lustenau	38	(4)
2021–	Vorwärts Steyr	3	(0)
- * Club domestic league appearances and goals as of 16:46, 24 July 2019 (UTC)

Christoph Freitag (born 21 January 1990) is an Austrian footballer who plays for Vorwärts Steyr.

== Club career ==
On 25 June 2015 Christoph Freitag signed for Wacker Innsbruck from Wiener Neustadt on a free transfer.

On 21 June 2021, he joined Vorwärts Steyr on a two-year contract.
