= Bojan Avramović =

Serbian footballer

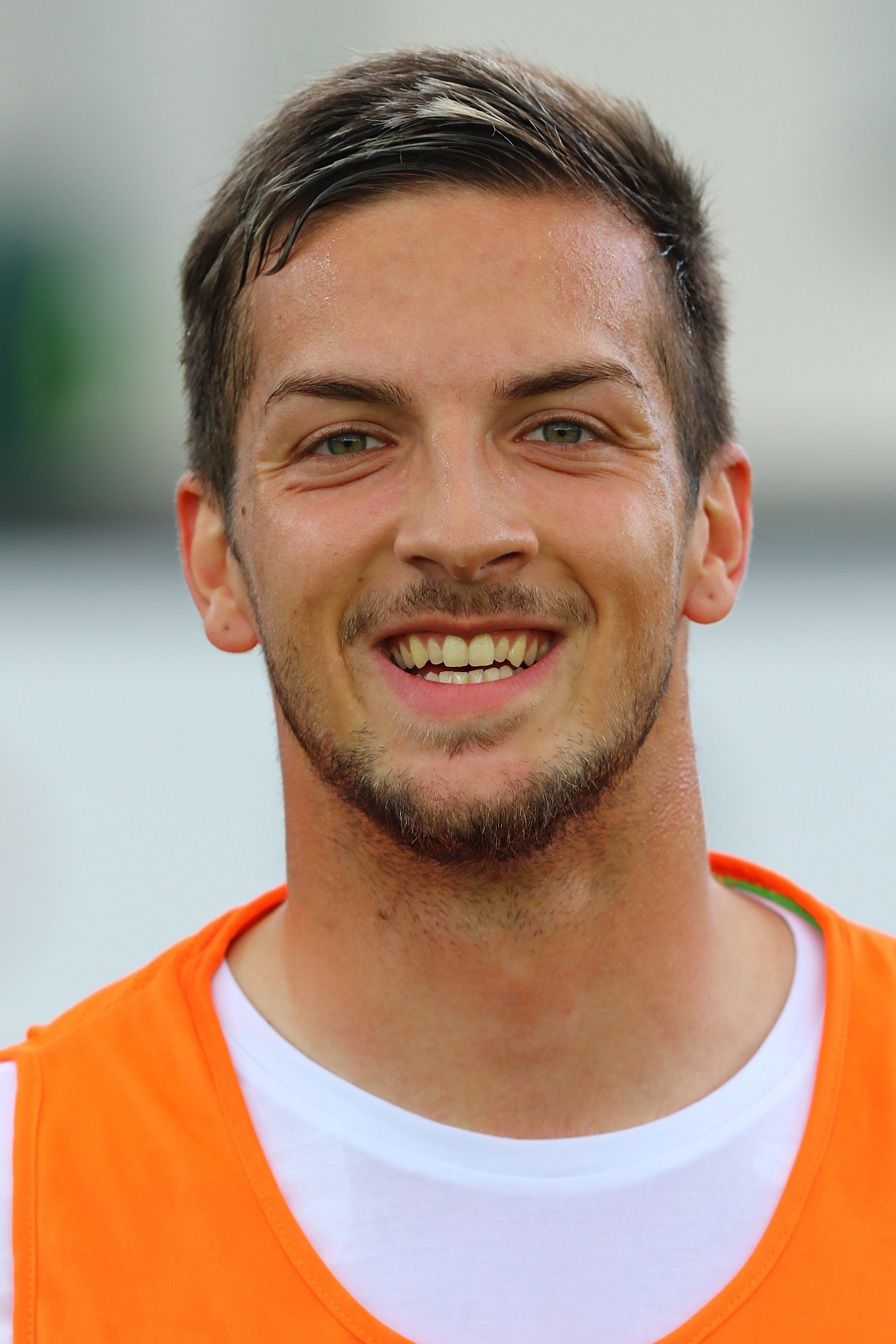
- Avramović in 2018

Personal information
- Date of birth: 17 September 1997 (age 29)
- Place of birth: Oberstdorf, Germany
- Height: 1.80 m (5 ft 11 in)
- Position: Left back

Team information
- Current team: FC Egg
- Number: 6

Youth career
- 2005–2011: Schwarz-Weiss Bregenz
- 2011–2015: AKA Vorarlberg

Senior career*
Years	Team	Apps	(Gls)
2015–2017	SCR Altach II	31	(0)
2017	→ FC Hard (loan)	12	(0)
2017–2018	Austria Lustenau	15	(0)
2018–2019	Wolfsberger II	22	(0)
2020	Austria Lustenau	12	(0)
2021–2023	FC Lauterach	39	(0)
2023	FC Höchst	6	(1)
2024-	FC Egg	0	(0)

International career
2014	Serbia U-17	2	(0)
2014	Serbia U-18	5	(0)
2016	Serbia U-19	2	(0)
- * Club domestic league appearances and goals as of 8 March 2024

Bojan Avramović (born 17 September 1997) is a Serbian football player who plays for FC Egg. He also holds Austrian citizenship.

== Career ==
=== Club career ===
Avramović started his career at Schwarz-Weiss Bregenz. In 2011 he joined the AKA Vorarlberg academy. In the summer of 2015 he joined the reserve team of SCR Altach. In July 2015, he made his debut in the Austrian Regionalliga when he was in the starting line-up against FC Kufstein on the first day of the 2015/16 season.

In January 2017 he joined FC Hard on loan. After the loan ended, he moved to Austrian Football First League club SC Austria Lustenau in the summer of 2017. He made his debut in the second division on 28 July 2017 when he came on as a substitute for Alexander Joppich in the 59th minute against SV Ried on matchday two of the 2017/18 season.

After the 2017/18 season he left Lustenau and moved to Austrian Football Bundesliga club Wolfsberger AC, where he received a contract that ran until June 2019. After the 2018/19 season, he left the WAC without having played a game for the club. After half a year without a club, he returned to second division club SC Austria Lustenau in February 2020, with whom he received a contract that ran until June 2020. After 14 more appearances in the second division for Lustenau, he left the club after the 2019/20 season.

After half a year without a club, he moved to FC Lauterach in January 2021.
