= Christian Schilling (Austrian footballer) =

Austrian footballer

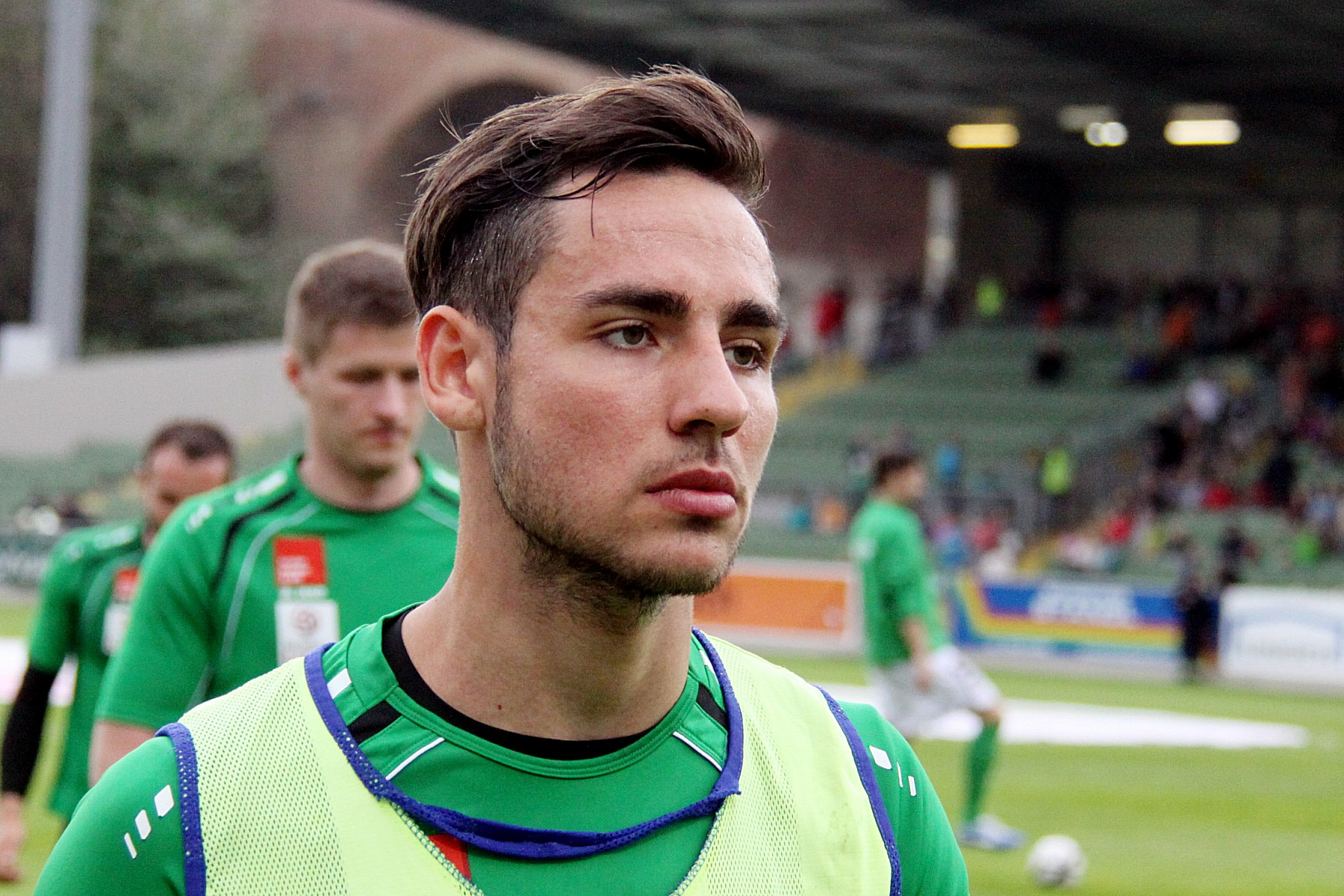
- Christian Schilling (2013)

Personal information
- Date of birth: 6 January 1992 (age 34)
- Place of birth: Austria
- Height: 1.83 m (6 ft 0 in)
- Position: Left back

Team information
- Current team: FC Zirl

Youth career
- 2001–2005: LUV Graz
- 2005–2009: Grazer AK

Senior career*
Years	Team	Apps	(Gls)
2009–2011	Grazer AK	45	(0)
2012–2015	Wacker Innsbruck	71	(3)
2015–2017	Rheindorf Altach	14	(0)
2017–2019	Ried	31	(1)
2019–2020	Austria Lustenau	12	(1)
2020–	FC Zirl	0	(0)

International career
2008–2009	Austria U-17	6	(0)
2010	Austria U-18	1	(0)
2010	Austria U-19	1	(0)
2013–2014	Austria U-21	9	(0)
- * Club domestic league appearances and goals as of 24 July 2020

Christian Schilling (born 6 January 1992) is an Austrian footballer who plays for FC Zirl.
