= Alexander Fröschl =

Austrian footballer

Personal information
- Date of birth: 15 July 1992 (age 34)
- Place of birth: Austria
- Height: 1.82 m (6 ft 0 in)
- Position: Forward

Team information
- Current team: First Vienna

Youth career
- SV Kirchdorf

Senior career*
Years	Team	Apps	(Gls)
2011–	Wacker Innsbruck	8	(0)
2014–	→ First Vienna (loan)	0	(0)
- * Club domestic league appearances and goals as of 17:36, 17 January 2014 (UTC)

Alexander Fröschl (born 15 July 1992) is an Austrian footballer. He previously played in the Austrian Bundesliga for Wacker Innsbruck.
