= Michael Lageder =

Austrian footballer

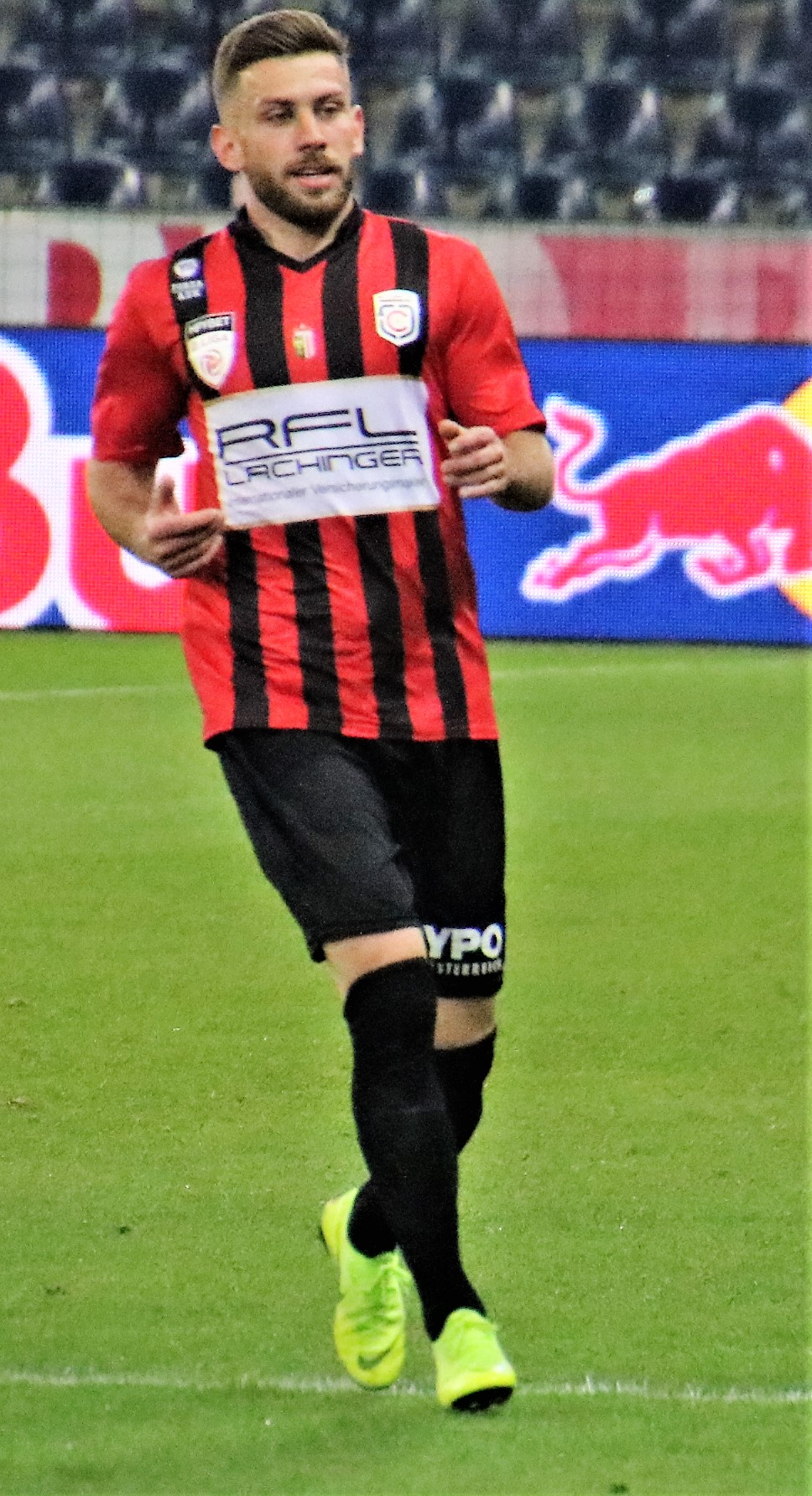

Personal information
- Date of birth: 24 April 1991 (age 35)
- Place of birth: Austria
- Height: 1.78 m (5 ft 10 in)
- Position: Defender

Team information
- Current team: Vorwärts Steyr
- Number: 28

Youth career
- –2008: SV Ried

Senior career*
Years	Team	Apps	(Gls)
2008–2010	Union St. Florian	7	(0)
2010–2015	Vorwärts Steyr	145	(5)
2015	FC Pasching/LASK Linz Juniors	36	(5)
2016–2017	LASK Linz	15	(1)
2017–2019	Juniors OÖ	52	(4)
2019–2021	Austria Lustenau	46	(0)
2021–	Vorwärts Steyr	52	(1)
- * Club domestic league appearances and goals as of 28 December 2024

Michael Lageder (born 24 April 1991) is an Austrian footballer who plays for Vorwärts Steyr.

== Club career ==
On 11 June 2021, he returned to Vorwärts Steyr.
