= Alexander Ranacher =

Austrian association footballer

Personal information
- Date of birth: 20 November 1998 (age 27)
- Place of birth: Lienz, Austria
- Height: 1.75 m (5 ft 9 in)
- Position: Midfielder

Team information
- Current team: Austria Klagenfurt
- Number: 13

Youth career
- 2005–2014: Matrei
- 2014–2015: Wolfsberger AC

Senior career*
Years	Team	Apps	(Gls)
2015–2018	Wolfsberger II	66	(5)
2016–2018	Wolfsberger AC	20	(0)
2018–2021	Austria Lustenau	85	(6)
2021–2025	Tirol	76	(4)
2022	Tirol II	1	(0)
2025–	Austria Klagenfurt	0	(0)
- * Club domestic league appearances and goals as of 17 May 2026

Alexander Ranacher (born 20 November 1998) is an Austrian professional footballer who plays as a midfielder for Austria Klagenfurt.

== Career ==
Ranacher is a youth product of the youth academy of Matrei and Wolfsberger AC. He was promoted to their reserves in 2015, and their senior side in 2016. On 7 July 2018, he transferred to Austria Lustenau on a 2-year contract. On 21 January 2020, he extended his contract for another year until 2021. On 14 July 2021, he transferred to Tirol.
