= Roman Mählich =

Austrian footballer and manager

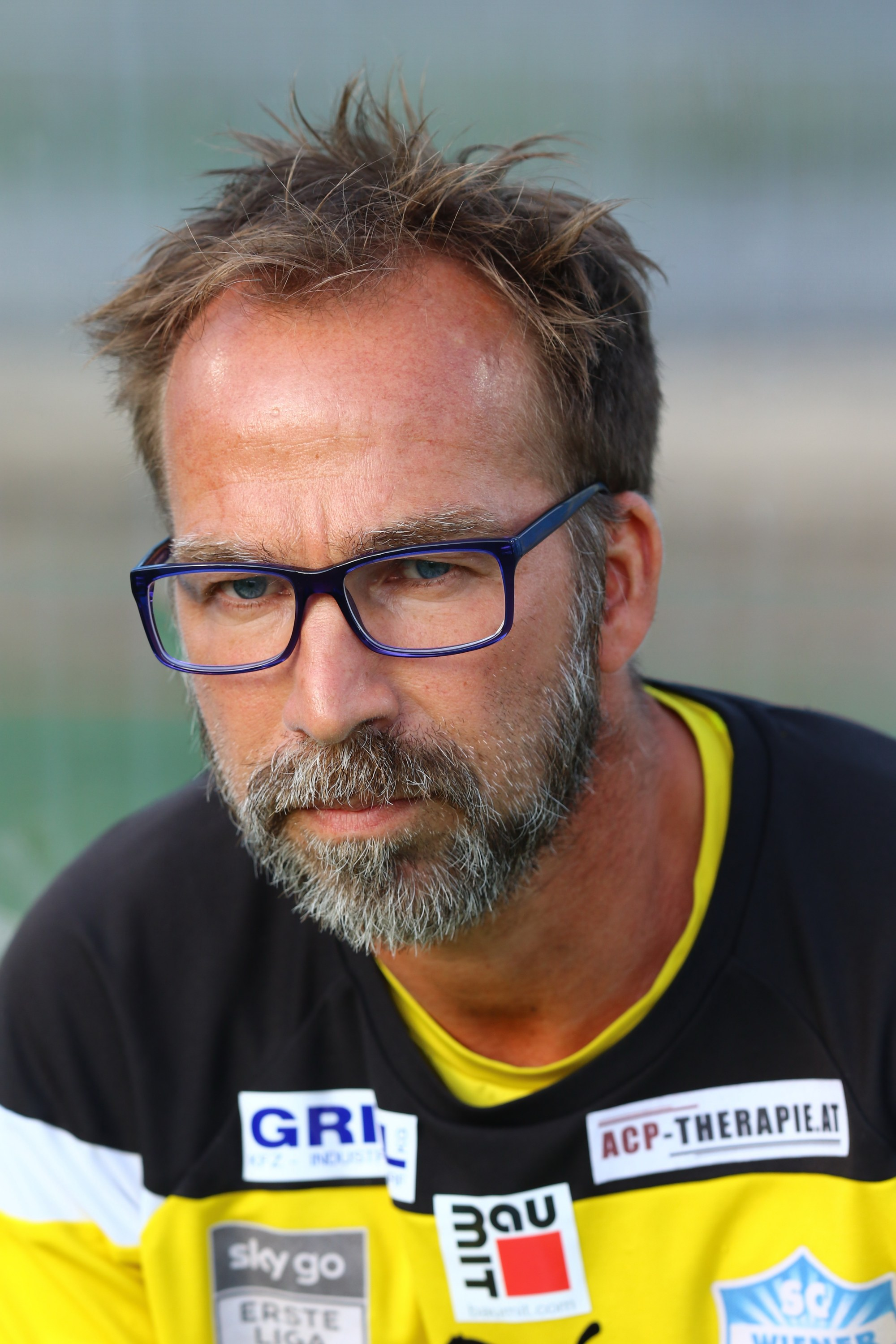
- Mählich as SC Wiener Neustadt coach

Personal information
- Date of birth: 17 September 1971 (age 55)
- Place of birth: Wiener Neustadt, Austria
- Height: 1.72 m (5 ft 8 in)
- Position: Midfielder

Team information
- Current team: SK Korneuburg (Sporting director)

Senior career*
| Years | Team | Apps | (Gls) |
| 1989–1994 | Wiener Sport-Club | 135 | (4) |
| 1994–1995 | FC Tirol Innsbruck | 30 | (0) |
| 1995–2003 | Sturm Graz | 196 | (15) |
| 2003–2004 | SC Untersiebenbrunn | 31 | (1) |
| 2005–2006 | Austrian Wien II | 45 | (2) |
| 2007 | ASK Schwadorf | 17 | (0) |
| 2008 | SV Wienerberger | 13 | (1) |
| 2008 | SCU Kilb | 7 | (2) |
| 2009 | SC Lassee | 13 | (0) |

International career
| 1992–2002 | Austria | 20 | (0) |

Managerial career
- 2008: Austria Wien (U19 director of sports)
- 2009: SC-ESV Parndorf 1919
- 2010–2012: SC Lassee
- 2012–2013: FC Marchfeld Mannsdorf
- 2014–2015: SV St. Margarethen
- 2015: Austrian Wien II
- 2015–2017: Austria Wien (U18)
- 2016–2017: Austrian Wien II (assistant)
- 2017–2018: SC Wiener Neustadt
- 2018–2019: Sturm Graz
- 2019–2020: Austria Lustenau
- 2024–: SK Korneuburg (sporting director)
- * Club domestic league appearances and goals

Roman Mählich (born 17 September 1971) is an Austrian football manager and a former player.

== Club career ==
A stocky midfielder, Mählich started his professional career at Wiener Sport-Club before moving to FC Tirol Innsbruck in 1994. After one season in Tyrol, he joined Sturm Graz and had his most successful period with them, winning two league titles and three domestic cups, as well as playing in the UEFA Champions League.

After eight seasons in Graz, he played for some lower league sides as well as for the Austria Wien reserves.

== International career ==
He made his debut for Austria in a September 1992 friendly match against Portugal and was a participant at the 1998 FIFA World Cup. He earned 20 caps, no goals scored. His last international was a May 2002 friendly match against Germany.

== Coaching career ==
Mählich has been head coach of Parndorf, SC Lassee, SC Mannsdorf, SV St. Margarethen, and the reserve team for Austria Wien. He was head coach of Parndorf from 1 July 2009 to 31 December 2009. His first match was a 5–1 win against Team für Wien on 7 August 2009. The following week, they were knocked out by Rapid Wien in extra time in the first round of the Austrian Cup. His final match was a 1–1 draw against Zwettl on 13 November 2009. He was head coach of Lassee between 1 January 2010 and 12 May 2012. Then he took over Mannsdorf between 24 September 2012 and 20 October 2013. His first match was a 3–2 loss against Leobendorf on 29 October 2012. His final match was a 4–1 loss against Bad Vöslau. He was head coach of St. Margarethen between 1 July 2014 and when he was appoint head coach of the reserve team of Austria Wien. His first match was a 1–1 draw against Klingenbach. His final match was a 2–2 draw against Pinkafeld on 21 March 2015. Mählich became the head coach of the reserve team for Austria Wien on 25 March 2015. After the season, he became a coach in the academy. Andreas Ogris replaced him on 22 June 2015.

On 16 September 2019, he was hired by Austria Lustenau. He left the club again at the end of the season.

After four years without a club - a period during which he worked as a TV pundit - it was confirmed in July 2024 that Mählich had been hired as sporting director of SK Korneuburg.

== Coaching record ==
As of 22 June 2015

| Team | From | To | Record | | | | | | | | |
| Team | From | To | M | W | D | L | GF | GA | GD | Win % | Ref. |
|---|---|---|---|---|---|---|---|---|---|---|---|
| Parndorf | 1 July 2009 | 31 December 2009 | 16 | 7 | 2 | 7 | 32 | 23 | +9 | 43.75 | |
| Lassee | 1 January 2010 | 12 May 2012 | | | | | | | | | |
| Mannsdorf | 24 September 2012 | 20 October 2013 | 35 | 18 | 6 | 11 | 76 | 54 | +22 | 51.43 | |
| St. Margarethen | 1 July 2014 | 25 March 2015 | 17 | 5 | 9 | 3 | 29 | 27 | +2 | 29.41 | |
| Austria Wien (A) | 25 March 2015 | 22 June 2015 | 11 | 2 | 3 | 6 | 14 | 16 | −2 | 18.18 | |

== Honours ==
- Austrian Football Bundesliga (2):
  - 1998, 1999
- Austrian Cup (3):
  - 1996, 1997, 1999
