= Lukas Katnik =

Austrian footballer

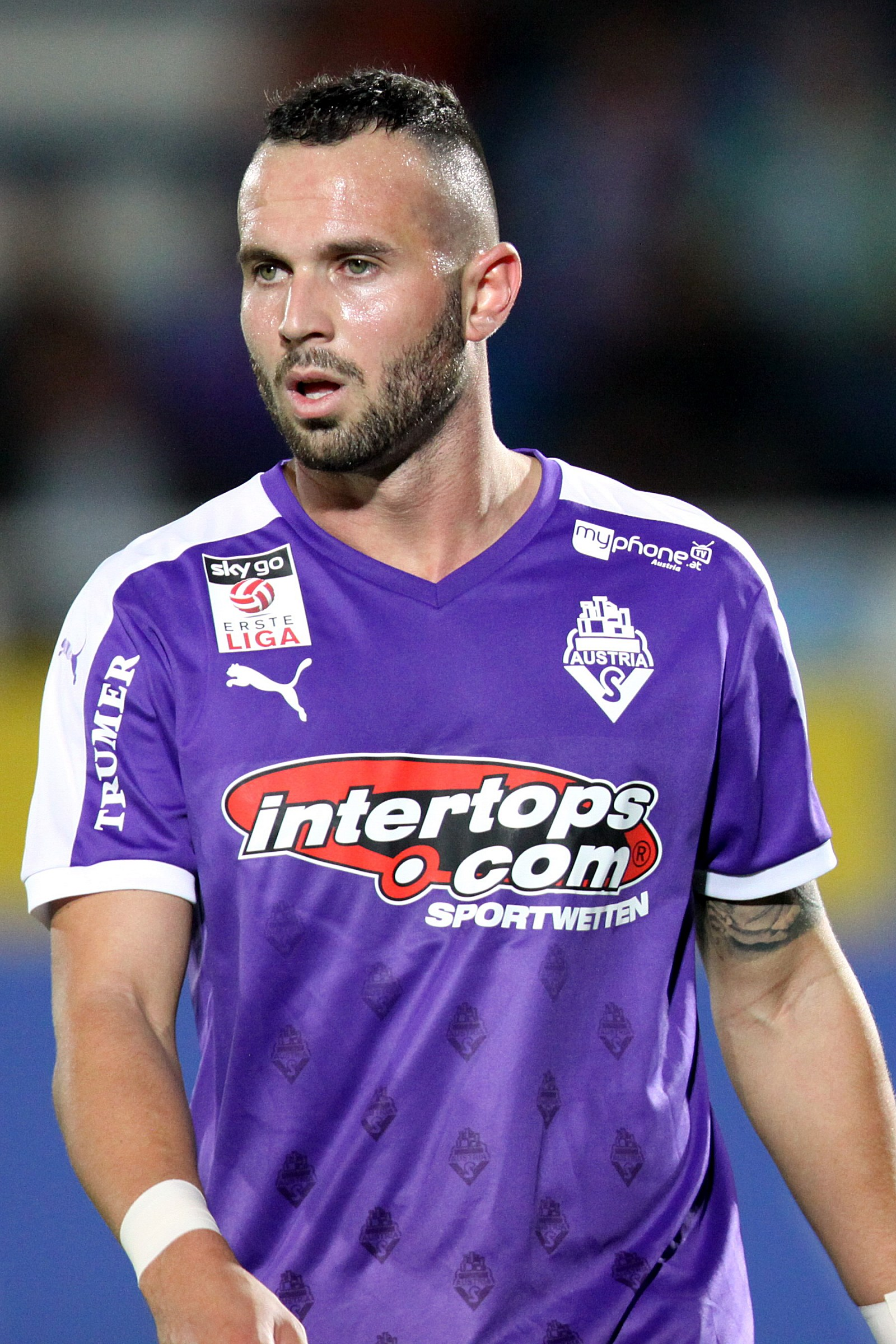

Personal information
- Date of birth: 31 July 1989 (age 37)
- Place of birth: Bregenz, Austria
- Height: 1.82 m (6 ft 0 in)
- Position: Forward

Team information
- Current team: SW Bregenz
- Number: 31

Youth career
- 1998–2004: FC Mäder
- 2004–2006: FC Koblach

Senior career*
| Years | Team | Apps | (Gls) |
| 2006–2007 | FC Koblach | | |
| 2009–2010 | Lustenau 07 | 25 | (4) |
| 2010 | FC Dornbirn | 15 | (10) |
| 2011–2013 | Red Bull Juniors | 13 | (5) |
| 2011 | → USK Anif (loan) | 16 | (10) |
| 2012–2013 | → FC Pasching (loan) | 18 | (4) |
| 2013–2016 | Austria Salzburg | 79 | (32) |
| 2016–2020 | WSG Wattens | 90 | (22) |
| 2020 | Austria Lustenau | 10 | (2) |
| 2020–2022 | FC Dornbirn | 52 | (11) |
| 2020– | SW Bregenz | 17 | (11) |
- * Club domestic league appearances and goals as of 12 November 2022

Lukas Katnik (born 31 July 1989) is an Austrian professional association football player who plays for SW Bregenz.

== Career ==
Katnik started playing football at FC Mäder in his home village. In 2004 he moved to FC Koblach before he was signed by FC Lustenau 07 in 2006. On 20 April 2007 he made his professional debut for the club when he came on as a substitute against DSV Leoben in the 64th minute for Marc Ender. He scored his first professional goal on 27 July 2009 against FK Austria Wien's reserve team. For the 2010/11 season he moved to FC Dornbirn in the Austrian Regionalliga West. At Dornbirn, he immediately became a goal getter and scored 10 goals in the fall. In January 2011 he moved to Salzburg to join Red Bull Juniors (today FC Liefering), the former second team of FC Red Bull Salzburg, but was immediately loaned out to their cooperation club USK Anif to help them with promotion to the Austrian Football Second League. After missing the promotion with the Anif, he returned to the Juniors. But he was again loaned out, this time to Salzburg's other cooperation club, FC Pasching. After the loan ended, he moved to SV Austria Salzburg. Here, he helped the team with promotion to the Austrian Football Second League in 2015.

After Salzburg's relegation to the Austrian Regionalliga again in the following season, he moved Austrian Football Second League club WSG Wattens in summer 2016. He helped the team with promotion to the Austrian Football Bundesliga after winning the second division in 2019, after which the club was renamed WSG Tirol. For WSG, he made 88 appearances in the 2nd division and two in the Bundesliga. In January 2020 he moved to SC Austria Lustenau, with whom he received a contract that ran until June 2020. He made ten second division appearances for Lustenau, in which he scored two goals.

For the 2020/21 season he returned to FC Dornbirn, with whom he received a contract that ran until June 2021.

== Honours ==
FC Pasching

Winner

- Austrian Cup: 2012–13
