= SV Lafnitz =

Austrian football club, based in Lafnitz

- Full name: Sportverein Lafnitz
- Founded: 1964; 62 years ago
- Ground: Sportplatz Lafnitz
- Capacity: 2,000
- Owner: Bernhard Loidl
- Chairman: Walter Kogler
- Manager: Robert Weinstabl
- League: Regionalliga South
- 2025–26: Regionalliga Central, 8th of 16
- Website: http://www.sv-licht-loidl-lafnitz.at/
colours	colours

Sportverein Lafnitz (commonly known as SV Licht-Loidl Lafnitz for sponsorship purposes) is an Austrian association football club from Lafnitz. They currently play in the Austrian Regionalliga South and play their home games at the Sportplatz Lafnitz in Lafnitz.

== History ==
The club, which is a part of the Styria Football Association, was founded in 1964 and played predominantly in the lower leagues within Styria.

With the takeover of the chairmanship by Bernhard Loidl, who previously supported the club with his company Licht Loidl as a sponsor, in 2009, the club achieved great sporting success. At two-year intervals, championship titles were celebrated, with which, by 2013, the rise from the sixth to the third division in Austria, the Regionalliga Mitte, was achieved.

At the same time, in 2011 and 2012, the old, dilapidated sports field was transformed into a new, smart football arena with a new clubhouse and new grandstand. Although the municipality has only 1,400 inhabitants, the capacity of the stadium holds about 2000 spectators. While an average of around 800 spectators visited the home matches in the national league, there are currently around 1000 visitors in the regional league, most of whom come from neighboring Burgenland. About 100 fans accompany the team to away games.

The players of the team generally come from the region, which makes them popular with supporters. There are currently some former players from neighboring second division TSV Hartberg at SV Lafnitz.

Two players made the leap into professional football via Lafnitz: the Croatian Domagoj Bešlić, who moved to the second division club Austria Klagenfurt in 2015 before returning to Lafnitz in January 2018, and Albert Vallci, who joined the second division club SV Horn in 2016.

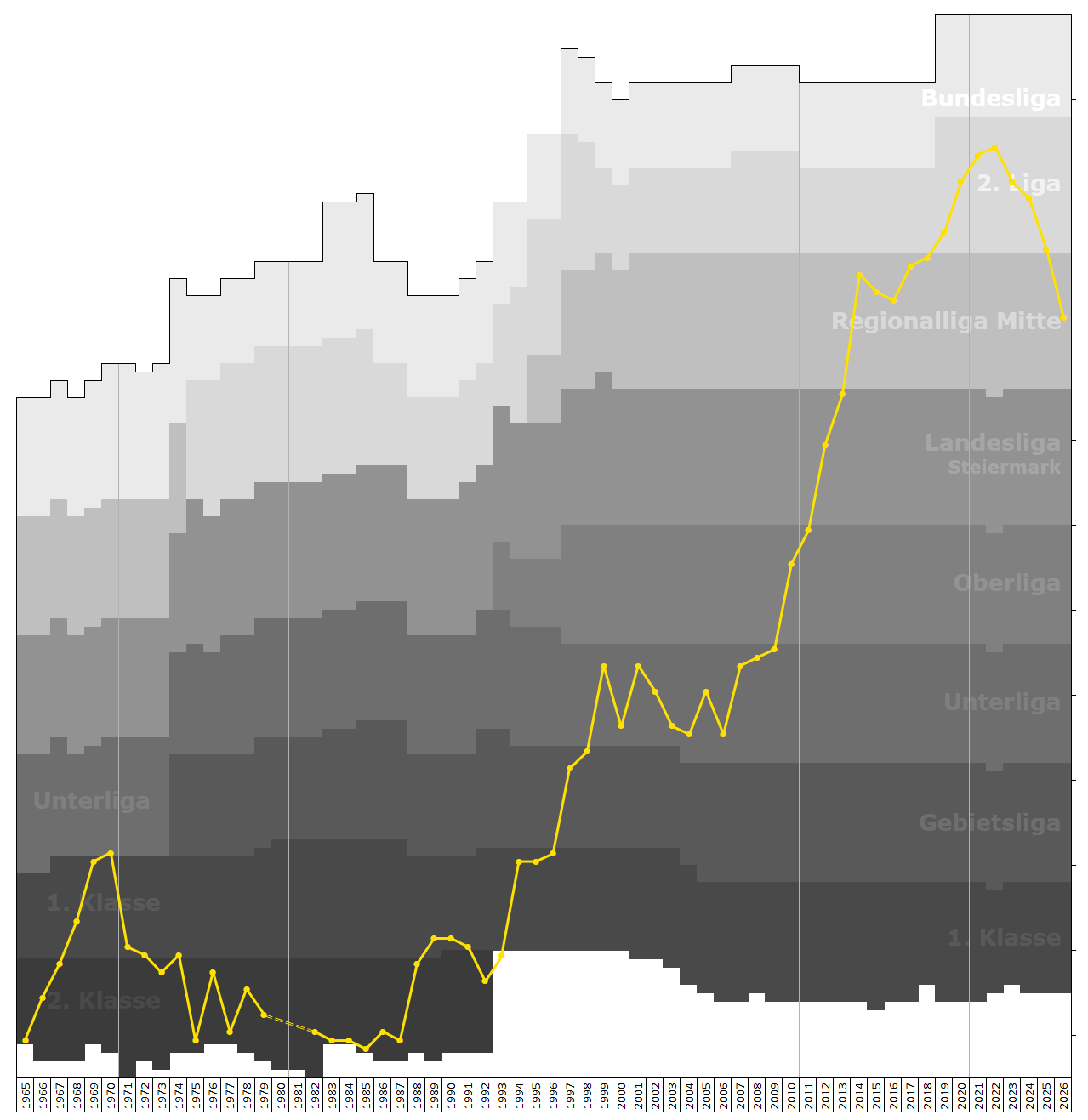
Historical chart of SV Lafnitz league performance

=== Promotion to the 2. Liga ===
Christian Waldl, who is in possession of the UEFA A license, arrived in the summer of 2012 from the USV Hartberg Umgebung and he succeeded right away to lead the team to the title in the Landesliga Steiermark. In September 2015, they parted company with Waldl. Waldl's successor was former Austrian international Ferdinand Feldhofer.

In the first season under Feldhofer (2015–16) the team finished in sixth place. In 2016–17, they finished just two points behind the champions TSV Hartberg in second place. In 2017–18 Lafnitz, who were top of the league from the 13th game, guaranteed their promotion to the 2. Liga with a 3–0 victory over Wolfsberger AC at the 26 game. Just two games later, the team sealed the championship title in the Regionalliga Mitte with a 3–1 victory over local rivals FC Gleisdorf 09.

Since their promotion to the 2. Liga in the 2018–19 season, Lafnitz has steadily climbed the table each year. After Feldhofer's departure at the end of 2019, current coach Philip Semlic has led the squad to finish as high as 4th place in the 2021-22 2. Liga and took them to a 3rd round appearance in the 2021–22 Austrian Cup.

== First-team squad ==
=== Current squad ===
As of 14 February 2026

Note: Flags indicate national team as defined under FIFA eligibility rules; some limited exceptions apply. Players may hold more than one non-FIFA nationality.

No.	Pos.	Nation	Player
1	GK	AUT	Gabriel Suprun
4	DF	SLO	Jakob Geister
6	MF	AUT	Lasse Lengheim
7	MF	AUT	Michael John Lema
8	MF	ESP	Martín Coello
9	FW	CRO	Valentin Akrap
10	MF	AUT	Bajram Syla
11	FW	BIH	Hamza Samardzic
12	MF	CRO	Lovre Baric
13	MF	GER	Justin Hofmann
14	MF	SVK	Gabriel Hornyák
16	DF	AUT	Mario Gintsberger
17	DF	AUT	Angelo Nenadic

No.	Pos.	Nation	Player
18	FW	AUT	Daniel Markl
19	DF	GRE	Giannis Karakoutis
20	DF	SLO	Žiga Dajčman
21	MF	CZE	Dominik Velecký
23	MF	AUT	Nico Forobosko
24	GK	AUT	Philipp Angeler
26	MF	AUT	Michael Preisinger
27	MF	HUN	Huba Hómann
30	FW	AUT	Lorenz Maurer
31	GK	AUT	Bernd Aineter
34	GK	AUT	Leonhard Gabbichler
35	GK	BIH	Kenan Memisevic

=== Coaching staff ===
Position	Staff
Head coach	(Austria) Philipp Semlic
Athletic coach	(Austria) Denny Krcmarek
Assistant coach	(Austria) Rainer Wohlmuth
Assistant coach	(Austria) Daniel Siegl
Video Analyst	(Austria) Michael Steiner
Goalkeeper coach	(Austria) Daniel Breier
Team manager	(Austria) Thomas Zingl
Physiotherapist	(Austria) Benjamin Ebner
Massagist	(Austria) Ferenc Jakab

== Coach history ==
No.	Head coach	Nationality	From	Until	Days
1	Norbert Krutzler	Austria	1 August 2008	14 February 2010	531
2	Johannes Sauhammel	Austria	15 February 2010	30 June 2012	866
3	Christian Waldl	Austria	30 July 2012	26 September 2015	1153
4	Rainer Wohlmuth (interim)	Austria	25 September 2015	9 October 2015	14
5	Ferdinand Feldhofer	Austria	10 October 2015	23 December 2019	1535
6	Philip Semlic	Austria	3 January 2020		

== Past seasons ==
Season	League	Level	Place	Pld	W	D	L	GF	GA	GD	Pts	Austrian Cup
2008–09	Unterliga Ost (VI)	6	1	26	19	3	4	83	32	51	60	not qualified
2009–10	Oberliga Süd/Ost (V)	5	5	26	11	9	6	50	36	14	42	not qualified
2010–11	Oberliga Süd/Ost (V)	5	1	26	21	2	3	77	31	46	65	not qualified
2011–12	Landesliga Steiermark (IV)	4	7	30	11	11	8	64	59	5	44	not qualified
2012–13	Landesliga Steiermark (IV)	4	1	30	19	6	5	80	36	44	63	not qualified
2013–14	Regionalliga Mitte (III)	3	3	30	17	4	9	68	55	13	55	1st round
2014–15	Regionalliga Mitte (III)	3	5	30	16	4	10	54	28	26	52	2nd round
2015–16	Regionalliga Mitte (III)	3	6	30	15	4	11	62	52	10	49	1st round
2016–17	Regionalliga Mitte (III)	3	2	30	18	6	6	54	27	27	60	3rd round
2017–18	Regionalliga Mitte (III)	3	1	30	19	10	1	70	16	54	67	1st round
2018–19	2. Liga (II)	2	12	30	8	9	13	36	42	-6	33	3rd round
2019–20	2. Liga (II)	2	8	30	9	12	9	42	42	0	39	1st round
2020–21	2. Liga (II)	2	5	30	17	4	9	56	35	21	55	2nd round
2021–22	2. Liga (II)	2	4	30	15	7	8	53	42	11	52	3rd round
2022–23	2. Liga (II)	2	8	30	12	5	13	48	46	2	41	2nd round
Green marks a season followed by promotion

== Reserve squad ==
=== Coaching staff ===
Position	Staff
Head coach	(Austria) Klaus Guger
Assistant coach	(Austria) Andreas Pichlbauer
Video Analyst	(Austria) Patrick Mikovits
Massagist	(Austria) Marco Wilfinger; Verena Schocher

=== Past seasons ===
Season	League	Level	Place	Pld	W	D	L	GF	GA	GD	Pts
2014–15	1. Klasse Ost A (VIII)	8	1	24	18	1	5	72	29	43	55
2015–16	Gebietsliga Ost (VII)	7	1	26	22	1	3	104	20	84	67
2016–17	Unterliga Ost (VI)	6	2	26	16	4	6	84	48	36	52
2017–18	Oberliga Süd/Ost (V)	5	1	26	18	3	5	76	37	39	57
2018–19	Landesliga Steiermark (IV)	4	6	30	14	5	11	58	51	7	47
2019–20	Landesliga Steiermark (IV)	4	3	15	8	5	2	30	13	17	29
2020–21	Landesliga Steiermark (IV)	4	6	11	6	3	2	22	13	9	21
2021–22	Landesliga Steiermark (IV)	4	3	30	18	6	6	80	29	51	60
2022–23	Landesliga Steiermark (IV)	4									
Green marks a season followed by promotion

== Honours ==
- Austrian Regionalliga Mitte (III)
  - Winners (1): 2017–18
  - Runner-ups (1): 2016–17
- Landesliga Steiermark (IV)
  - Winners (1): 2012–13
- Oberliga Süd/Ost (V)
  - Winners (1): 2010–11, 2017–18 ‡
- Unterliga Ost (VI)
  - Winners (1): 2008–09
  - Runner-ups (1): 2016–17 ‡
- Gebietsliga Ost (VII)
  - Winners (1): 2015–16 ‡
- 1. Klasse Mitte A (VIII)
  - Winners (1): 2014–15 ‡

‡ Reserve team
