= 2016–17 FK Austria Wien season =

The 2016–17 FK Austria Wien season was the 105th season in the club's history.

== Bundesliga ==
=== League table ===
Pos	Team	Pld	W	D	L	GF	GA	GD	Pts	Qualification or relegation
1	Red Bull Salzburg (C)	36	25	6	5	74	24	+50	81	Qualification for the Champions League second qualifying round
2	Austria Wien	36	20	3	13	72	50	+22	63	Qualification for the Europa League third qualifying round
3	Sturm Graz	36	19	3	14	55	39	+16	60	Qualification for the Europa League second qualifying round
4	Rheindorf Altach	36	15	8	13	46	49	−3	53	Qualification for the Europa League first qualifying round
5	Rapid Wien	36	12	10	14	52	42	+10	46	

Source: weltfussball.de (in German), Soccerway
Rules for classification: 1) Points; 2) Goal difference; 3) Goals scored; 4) Matches won; 5) Away matches won; 6) Head-to-head points; 7) Head-to-head goal difference; 8) Head-to-head goals scored.
(C) Champions

=== Results summary ===
Overall								Home						Away					
Pld	W	D	L	GF	GA	GD	Pts	W	D	L	GF	GA	GD	W	D	L	GF	GA	GD
36	20	3	13	72	50	+22	63	10	1	7	36	25	+11	10	2	6	36	25	+11

Last updated: 25 July 2017.

=== Bundesliga fixtures and results ===
Win Draw Loss

MD	Date	H/A	Opponent	Res. F–A	Att.	Goalscorers		Table	
MD	Date	H/A	Opponent	Res. F–A	Att.	Austria Wien	Opponent	Pos.	Pts.
1	23 July	A	SKN St. Pölten	2–1	7,425	Kayode 45+1'; Tajouri 90+5'	Hartl 80'	3	3
2	30 July	H	SV Mattersburg	3–1	5,143	Venuto 60', 90+4'; Tajouri 67'	Bürger 28'	1	6
3	7 August	H	Rapid Vienna	1–4	15,238	Kayode 63'	Traustason 33'; Schaub 65'; Grahovac 87'; Joelinton 90+3'	4	6
4	14 August	A	Sturm Graz	1–3	10,167	Filipović 79'	Alar 38', 66'; Huspek 70'	5	6
5	21 August	H	Rheindorf Altach	3–1	5,120	Tajouri 24'; Friesenbichler 61', 68'	Oberlin 58'	5	9
6	28 August	A	SV Ried	1–1	3,332	Tajouri 26'	Honsak 71'; Zulj (red card) 77'	5	10
7	10 September	H	Wolfsberger AC	4–1	5,018	Venuto 14'; Holzhauser 17'; Grünwald 26', 79'	Prosenik 49'	4	13
8	18 September	A	Red Bull Salzburg	1–4	8,000	Grünwald 56'	Soriano 16', 49', 60'; Wanderson 86'	5	13
9	24 September	H	Admira Wacker	1–2	5,910	Tajouri 36'	Sax 13'; Monschein 63'	5	13
10	2 October	H	SKN St. Pölten	2–1	4,800	Serbest 81'; Kayode 85'	Lumu 52'	5	16
11	16 October	A	SV Mattersburg	2–0	2,600	Grünwald 49'; Martschinko 87'		4	19
12	23 October	A	Rapid Vienna	2–0	2,600	Holzhauser 37' (pen.); Grünwald 48'		4	22
13	30 October	H	Sturm Graz	2–0	11,128	Holzhauser 51' (pen.); Kayode 67'		4	25
15	6 November	A	Rheindorf Altach	1–5	4,549	Filipović 88'	Ngamaleu 12'; Dovedan 42', 65'; Lienhart 76'; Oberlin 90'	4	25
15	19 November	H	SV Ried	2–0	6,274	Grünwald 63'; Kayode 74'		4	28
16	27 November	A	Wolfsberger AC	3–0	6,274	Tajouri 55'; Venuto 76'; Friesenbichler 93'		3	31
17	30 November	H	Red Bull Salzburg	1–3	4,884	Kayode 70'	Martschinko 47' (o.g.); Laimer 64'; Minamino 86'	4	31
18	3 December	A	Admira Wacker	2–0	2,886	Kayode 69'; Holzhauser 88' (pen.)		4	34
19	10 December	A	SKN St. Pölten	1–2	2,886	Holzhauser 90+2' (pen.)	Schütz 48'; Keita 89'; Huber (red card) 90+2'	4	34
20	17 December	H	SV Mattersburg	2–0	4,751	Venuto 53'; Filipović 57'		4	37
21	12 February	H	Rapid Vienna	1–1	15,577	Rotpuller 90+4'	Kvilitaia 55'; Joelinton (yellow card) 67' (red card)	4	38
22	18 February	A	Sturm Graz	4–0	8,989	Grünwald 60'; Rotpuller 88'; Friesenbichler 90+2'; Felipe Pires 90+6'		3	41
23	25 February	H	Rheindorf Altach	1–3	5,879	Holzhauser 89' (pen.)	Ngamaleu 4'; Dovedan 29', 58' (pen.)	3	41
24	4 March	A	SV Ried	3–0	4,003	Holzhauser 24'; Kayode 44'; Venuto 58'		3	44
25	11 March	H	Wolfsberger AC	3–0	6,053	Sollbauer 34' (o.g.); Grünwald 54'; Kayode 81'		3	47
26	19 March	A	Red Bull Salzburg	0–5	10,200		Berisha 33'; Ulmer 48'; Hwang 78', 90'; Radošević 84'	3	47
27	1 April	H	Admira Wacker	0–2	5,834		Zwierschitz 34'; Starkl 63'	4	47
28	8 April	H	SKN St. Pölten	1–2	5,426	Kayode 22'	Stryger Larsen 36' (o.g.); Doumbouya 55' (pen.)	4	47
29	16 April	A	SV Mattersburg	3–0	6,200	Kayode 22'; Grünwald 45'; Felipe Pires 75'		3	50
30	23 April	A	Rapid Vienna	2–0	26,000	Venuto 22'; Felipe Pires 56'		2	53
31	29 April	H	Sturm Graz	4–0	9,500	Tajouri 25'; Filipović 31'; Kayode 53', 57'; Rotpuller (yellow card) 73' (red card)		2	56
32	7 May	A	Rheindorf Altach	1–1	4,520	Kayode 39'	Dovedan 25'	2	57
33	13 May	H	SV Ried	3–0	8,214	Kayode 16', 21'; Serbest 31'		2	60
34	20 May	A	Wolfsberger AC	1–2	4,688	Felipe Pires 13'	Offenbacher 2'; Tschernegg 58'	2	60
35	25 May	H	Red Bull Salzburg	2–3	11,054	Andreas Ulmer 6' (o.g.); Kayode 29'	Haidara 44'; Hwang 64'; Lazaro 66'	2	60
36	28 May	A	Admira Wacker	6–1	3,651	Alexander Grünwald 19', 89'; Holzhauser 62'; Prokop 71'; Tajouri 74'; Friesenbichler 80'	Knasmüllner 42' (pen.)	2	63

== Austrian Cup ==
=== Austrian Cup Fixtures and results ===
Rd	Date	H/A	Opponent	Res. F–A	Att.	Goalscorers	
Rd	Date	H/A	Opponent	Res. F–A	Att.	Austria Wien	Opponent
1	17 July	A	Dornbirn	6–0	2,200	Kvasina 17'; Kahat 30', 37'; Felipe Pires 47'; Tajouri 56'; Serbest 68'	Schibany 34'
2	21 September	A	Dornbirn	3–1 (a.e.t.)	3,150	Kayode 55', 108'; Tajouri 117'	Schibany 34'
3	26 October	A	ASK Ebreichsdorf	5–4 (a.e.t.)	3,200	Venuto 7'; Rotpuller 15'; Friesenbichler 67', 101'; Felipe Pires 102'	Hatzl 75'; Bauer 86'; Pomer 90+1'; Vukajlović 111'
QF	5 April	H	Admira Wacker	1–2	5,054	Friesenbichler 34'	Knasmüllner 6'; Monschein 14'

== Europa League ==
=== League table ===
Pos	Team	Pld	W	D	L	GF	GA	GD	Pts	Qualification
1	(Italy) Roma	6	3	3	0	16	7	+9	12	Advance to knockout phase
2	(Romania) Astra Giurgiu	6	2	2	2	7	10	−3	8	Advance to knockout phase
3	(Czech Republic) Viktoria Plzeň	6	1	3	2	7	10	−3	6	
4	Austria Wien	6	1	2	3	11	14	−3	5	

Source: UEFA

=== Europa League Fixtures and results ===
==== Qualifying rounds ====
Rd	Date	H/A	Opponent	Res. F–A	Att.	Goalscorers	
Rd	Date	H/A	Opponent	Res. F–A	Att.	Austria Wien	Opponent
Q2 L1	14 July	H	FK Kukësi	1–0	4,312	Felipe Pires 24'	
Q2 L2	21 July	A	FK Kukësi	4–1	3,000	Kayode 16', 58'; Holzhauser 67'; Martschinko 90'	Hallaçi 78'
Austria Wien won 5-1 on aggregate
Q3 L1	28 July	H	Spartak Trnava	0–1	6,835		Tambe 46'
Q3 L2	4 August	A	Spartak Trnava	1–0 (a.e.t.)	17,152	Friesenbichler 88'	
Q3 L2	4 August	A	Spartak Trnava	1–0 (a.e.t.)	17,152	Penalty shoot-out	
Q3 L2	4 August	A	Spartak Trnava	1–0 (a.e.t.)	17,152	Stryger Larsen (penalty scored); Tajouri (penalty scored); Kvasina (penalty scored); Serbest (penalty scored); Friesenbichler (penalty scored)	(penalty scored) Godál; (penalty scored) Schranz; (penalty scored) Sloboda; (penalty missed) Mikovič
1-1 on aggregate, Austria Wien won 5-4 on penalties
PO L1	18 August	H	Rosenborg	2–1	6,090	Grünwald 51'; Felipe Pires 53'	Reginiussen 59'
PO L2	25 August	A	Rosenborg	2–1	11,692	Grünwald 58'; Kayode 69'	Gytkjær 90+1'
Austria Wien won 4-2 on aggregate

==== Group stage ====
Rd	Date	H/A	Opponent	Res. F–A	Att.	Goalscorers	
Rd	Date	H/A	Opponent	Res. F–A	Att.	Austria Wien	Opponent
GpE 1	15 September	A	Astra Giurgiu	3–2	3,300	Holzhauser 16' (pen.); Friesenbichler 33'; Grünwald 58'	Alibec 18'; Săpunaru 74'
GpE 2	29 September	H	Viktoria Plzeň	0–0	16,509		
GpE 3	20 October	A	Roma	3–3	16,478	Holzhauser 16'; Prokop 82'; Kayode 84'	El Shaarawy 19', 34'; Florenzi 69'
GpE 4	3 November	H	Roma	2–4	32,751	Kayode 2'; Grünwald 89'	Džeko 5', 65'; De Rossi 18'; Nainggolan 78'
GpE 5	24 November	H	Astra Giurgiu	1–2	14,127	Rotpuller 57'; Grünwald (yellow card) 65' (red card)	Florea 79'; Budescu 88'
GpE 6	8 December	A	Viktoria Plzeň	1–2	9,117	Holzhauser 19' (pen.); Rotpuller 40'	Hořava 44'; Ďuriš 72', 84'

== Player information ==
=== Squad and statistics ===
As of 1 June 2017

No.	Pos	Nat	Player	Total		Bundesliga		Austrian Cup		Europa League	
No.	Pos	Nat	Player	Apps	Goals	Apps	Goals	Apps	Goals	Apps	Goals
31	GK	(Austria) AUT	Osman Hadžikić	35	0	27	0	2	0	6	0
1	GK	(Austria) AUT	Robert Almer	16	0	9	0	0	0	7	0
32	GK	(Austria) AUT	Patrick Pentz	2	0	0	0	2	0	0	0
17	DF	(Denmark) DEN	Jens Stryger Larsen	43	0	29	0	2	0	12	0
4	DF	(Croatia) CRO	Petar Filipović	46	4	31	4	3	0	12	0
3	DF	(Austria) AUT	Richard Windbichler	13	0	11	0	1	0	1	0
18	DF	(Czech Republic) CZE	Patrizio Stronati	5	0	2	0	1	0	2	0
28	DF	(Austria) AUT	Christoph Martschinko	36	1	23	1	2	0	11	0
6	DF	(Ghana) GHA	Abdul Kadiri Mohammed	11	0	10	0	1	0	0	0
25	DF	(Austria) AUT	Thomas Salamon	20	0	16	0	3	0	1	0
33	DF	(Austria) AUT	Lukas Rotpuller	41	5	29	2	2	1	10	2
2	DF	(Austria) AUT	Petar Gluhakovic	2	0	1	0	1	0	0	0
24	DF	(Austria) AUT	Alexandar Borkovic	2	0	2	0	0	0	0	0
19	DF	(Austria) AUT	Michael Blauensteiner	1	0	1	0	0	0	0	0
26	MF	(Austria) AUT	Raphael Holzhauser	50	12	35	8	3	0	12	4
10	MF	(Austria) AUT	Alexander Grünwald	47	15	36	11	2	0	9	4
16	MF	(Austria) AUT	Dominik Prokop	18	2	13	1	1	0	4	1
15	MF	(Austria) AUT	Tarkan Serbest	49	3	33	2	4	1	12	0
19	MF	(Israel) ISR	Roi Kahat	4	2	1	0	1	2	2	0
23	MF	(Spain) ESP	David de Paula	17	0	12	0	1	0	4	0
5	MF	(Croatia) CRO	Ognjen Vukojević	8	0	3	0	3	0	2	0
8	FW	(Nigeria) NGR	Olarenwaju Kayode	48	24	33	17	3	2	12	5
11	FW	(Brazil) BRA	Lucas Venuto	44	8	29	7	3	1	12	0
95	FW	(Brazil) BRA	Felipe Pires	50	8	34	4	4	2	12	2
9	FW	(Austria) AUT	Kevin Friesenbichler	44	10	32	5	3	3	9	2
7	FW	(Libya) LBA	Ismael Tajouri	46	10	32	8	4	2	10	0
27	FW	(Austria) AUT	Marko Kvasina	24	1	16	0	4	1	4	0

== Transfers ==
=== In ===
Pos.	Name	Age	Nationality	Moving from	Type	Transfer Window	Transfer fee
DF	Christoph Martschinko	22	Austria	(Germany) Hoffenheim	Transfer	Summer	£450,0000
DF	Petar Filipović	25	Croatia	SV Ried	Transfer	Summer	£270,000
FW	Felipe Pires	20	Brazil	(Germany) Hoffenheim	Loan	Summer	£135,000
MF	Abdul Kadiri Mohammed	20	Ghana	(Ghana) Ashanti Gold	Transfer	Summer	Undisclosed
FW	Kevin Friesenbichler	21	Austria	(Portugal) Benfica	Loan	Summer	Undisclosed
DF	Marko Pejić	21	Croatia	Admira Wacker	Transfer	Winter	Undisclosed

=== Out ===
Pos.	Name	Age	Nationality	Moving to	Type	Transfer Window	Transfer fee
MF	Roi Kahat	24	Israel	(Israel) Maccabi Haifa	Transfer	Summer	£700,000
FW	Marios Pechlivanis	21	Cyprus	(Cyprus) Olympiakos Nicosia	Free transfer	Summer	Free
MF	Alexander Gorgon	27	Austria	(Croatia) HNK Rijeka	Free transfer	Summer	Free
DF	Marco Stark	23	Austria	Austria Lustenau	Free transfer	Summer	Free
DF	Fabian Koch	27	Austria	Sturm Graz	Free transfer	Summer	Free
DF	Vance Sikov	30	(North Macedonia) Macedonia	(Azerbaijan) Neftçi	Free transfer	Summer	Free
MF	Marco Meilinger	24	Austria	(Denmark) Aalborg	Free transfer	Summer	Free
DF	Bernhard Luxbacher	21	Austria	Released		Summer	
DF	Patrizio Stronati	22	Czech Republic	(Czech Republic) Mladá Boleslav	Loan	Winter	
DF	Richard Windbichler	25	Austria	(South Korea) Ulsan	Transfer	Winter	Undisclosed
