= 2015–16 FK Austria Wien season =

The 2015–16 FK Austria Wien season was the 104th season in the club's history.

== Background ==
=== Background information ===
Austria Wien received their licence on 30 April without any restrictions. Austria finished seventh in the 2014–15 Bundesliga and were the runner–up in the 2014–15 Austrian Cup. Gerald Baumgartner was sacked by Austria Wien during the 2014–15 season. Mirko Slomka rejected an offer from Austria Wien. Felix Magath eventually became the "preferred" choice. Magath opted not to sign with the club and Thorsten Fink became top candidate for the position. Fink was eventually hired on 28 May. He was given a two–year contract plus an option. Andreas Ogris became the assistant coach. It was later decided that Ogris would return to the reserve team. Austria had their first training under Thorsten Fink on 22 June.

Robert Almer, Olarenwaju Kayode, Ognjen Vukojević, Roi Kahat, and Richard Windbichler transferred to Austria Wien. Manuel Ortlechner became a reserve team player for Austria and also became an assistant coach for the under–14 team for the club. Kevin Friesenbichler was loaned to Austria with the option to purchase after a season. Heinz Lindner, Daniel Royer, Sascha Horvath, Markus Suttner and Martin Harrer left the club. Suttner had been at the club for 14 years.

=== Transfers ===
==== In ====
No.	Pos.	Name	Age	EU	Moving from	Type	Transfer Window	Contract ends	Transfer fee	Ref.
	GK	Robert Almer	31	Yes	Hannover 96	Transfer	Summer	2017	Undisclosed	
	FW	Olarenwaju Kayode	22	No	Maccabi Netanya	Transfer	Summer	2018	Undisclosed	
	MF	Ognjen Vukojević	31	Yes	Dynamo Kyiv	Transfer	Summer	2017	Free	
	MF	Roi Kahat	23	Yes	Hapoel Ironi Kiryat Shmona	Transfer	Summer	2019	Undisclosed	
3	DF	Richard Windbichler	24	Yes	Admira Wacker	Transfer	Summer	2017	Undisclosed	
	FW	Kevin Friesenbichler	21	Yes	Benfica	Loan	Summer	—	Undisclosed	
	MF	Lucas Venuto	21	No	SV Grödig	Transfer	Winter	2019	Undisclosed	

==== Out ====
No.	Pos.	Name	Age	EU	Moving to	Type	Transfer Window	Transfer fee	Ref.
13	GK	Heinz Lindner	24	Yes	Eintracht Frankfurt	Free Transfer	Summer	Free	
	MF	Daniel Royer	25	Yes	FC Midtjylland	Transfer	Summer	Undisclosed	
21	MF	Sascha Horvath	18	Yes	Sturm Graz	Transfer	Summer	Undisclosed	
	DF	Markus Suttner	28	Yes	Ingolstadt 04	Transfer	Summer	€700,000	
	FW	Martin Harrer	23	Yes	Rheindorf Altach	Transfer	Summer	Undisclosed	

== Bundesliga ==
=== Bundesliga review ===
==== Matchdays 1–9 ====
Austria started their Bundesliga campaign with a two–match winning streak. In the first match, on 26 July, Austria defeated Wolfsberg 2–0 with a goal from a penalty shot by Alexander Gorgon and a second half goal from Alexander Grünwald. Austria finished the matchday in second place. In the second match, on 2 August, Austria defeated Rheindorf Altach 3–1. Vanče Šikov, Olarenwaju Kayode, and Alexander Gorgon. Gorgon scored from the penalty mark for the second consecutive week. César Ortiz scored for Altach. Austria finished the matchday tied for first place with Rapid Wien. Then on matchday three, on 8 August, Austria dropped their first points of the season when Austria and Grödig finished in a 2–2 draw. Austria got a goal from Alexander Grünwald and an own goal from Harald Pichler and Grödig got a goal from Benjamin Sulimani and a goal from the penalty mark from Lucas Henrique. Lukas Rotpuller was sent–off during the match. Austria finished the matchday in second place. Austria picked up their first loss on 12 August (matchday four) in the Vienna derby. Rapid Wien won 5–2. Alexander Gorgon scored two goals for Austria and Stefan Stangl, Philipp Schobesberger, Stefan Schwab, Steffen Hofmann, and Robert Berić scored for Rapid. Austria finished the matchday in fourth place.

=== League table ===
Pos	Team	Pld	W	D	L	GF	GA	GD	Pts	Qualification or relegation
1	Red Bull Salzburg (C)	36	21	11	4	71	33	+38	74	Qualification for the Champions League second qualifying round
2	Rapid Wien	36	20	5	11	66	42	+24	65	Qualification for the Europa League third qualifying round
3	Austria Wien	36	17	8	11	65	48	+17	59	Qualification for the Europa League second qualifying round
4	Admira Wacker Mödling	36	13	11	12	45	51	−6	50	Qualification for the Europa League first qualifying round
5	Sturm Graz	36	12	12	12	40	40	0	48	

Source: weltfussball.de (in German), Soccerway
Rules for classification: 1) Points; 2) Less matches awarded against; 3) Goal difference; 4) Goals scored; 5) Matches won; 6) Away matches won; 7) Head-to-head points; 8) Head-to-head goal difference; 9) Head-to-head goals scored.
(C) Champions

=== Results summary ===
Overall								Home						Away					
Pld	W	D	L	GF	GA	GD	Pts	W	D	L	GF	GA	GD	W	D	L	GF	GA	GD
15	9	4	2	28	19	+9	31	4	2	1	15	10	+5	5	2	1	13	9	+4

Last updated: 7 November 2015.

=== Bundesliga fixtures and results ===
Win Draw Loss

MD	Date	H/A	Opponent	Res. F–A	Att.	Goalscorers and disciplined players		Table		Ref.
MD	Date	H/A	Opponent	Res. F–A	Att.	Austria Wien	Opponent	Pos.	Pts.	Ref.
1	26 July	A	Wolfsberg	2–0	3,600	Vukojević (yellow card) 20'; Gorgon 37' (pen.); Grünwald 59'	Kofler (yellow card) 35'; Trdina (yellow card) 48'; Sílvio (red card) 70'	2	3	
2	2 August	H	Rheindorf Altach	3–1	8,057	Šikov 29'; Grünwald (yellow card) 45'; Kayode 60'; Gorgon 71' (pen.)	Ortiz 33'; Hofbauer (yellow card) 37'; Netzer (yellow card) 69'	1	6	
3	8 August	A	Grödig	2–2	1,667	Martschinko (yellow card) 58'; Grünwald 64' (yellow card) 86'; Rotpuller (red card) 73'; Pichler 80' (o.g.); Holzhauser (yellow card) 90+5'	Sulimani 53'; Henrique 60' (pen.); Rasner (yellow card) 90+4'	2	7	
4	12 August	H	Rapid Wien	2–5	12,500	Vukojević (yellow card) 36'; Holzhauser (yellow card) 39'; Gorgon 45+2', 72'; Kayode (yellow card) 50'; Friesenbichler (yellow card) 78'	Stangl 17'; Schobesberger 27'; Schwab 33'; Sonnleitner (yellow card) 45+1'; Petsos (yellow card) 54'; Hofmann S. 56'; Berić 66'; Auer (yellow card) 80'	4	7	
5	15 August	H	Mattersburg	5–1	5,797	Gorgon 20' (pen.), 45+3'; Kayode 42', 90+1'; Meilinger 87'	Fran (red card) 10'; Onisiwo 39'	3	10	
6	23 August	A	Red Bull Salzburg	2–2	8,358	Grünwald 17'; Šikov (yellow card) 44'; Kayode 48'; Rotpuller (yellow card) 69' (yellow card) 72' (red card); Meilinger (yellow card) 73'; Koch (yellow card) 90+4'; Holzhauser (yellow card) 90+4'	Prevljak 25'; Ulmer (yellow card) 58'; Lainer 75'	3	11	
7	29 August	A	Admira Wacker	1–0	4,986	Šikov (yellow card) 37'; Martschinko (yellow card) 44'; Gorgon 61' (pen.)	Sax (yellow card) 20'; Bajrami (yellow card) 43'; Ebner (yellow card) 55'; Neuhold (yellow card) 60'; Schicker (yellow card) 90+4'	2	14	
8	12 September	H	Ried	1–1	6,044	Holzhauser 45'	Kragl (yellow card) 20'; Reifeltshammer (yellow card) 26'; Trauner 58'; Filipović (yellow card) 61'; Janeczek (yellow card) 66'; Alberto Prada (yellow card) 88'; Gebauer (yellow card) 90+1'	3	15	
9	19 September	A	Sturm Graz	0–2	8,365	–	Gruber 66'; Horvath 76'; Tadic (yellow card) 83'	5	15	
10	26 September	H	Wolfsberg	1–0	5,671	Grünwald 76'	Berger (yellow card) 80'; Hüttenbrenner (yellow card) 89'	3	18	
11	3 October	A	Rheindorf Altach	2–1	4,902	Kayode 43'; Grünwald (yellow card) 45'; Koch 65' (yellow card) 90+3'; Rotpuller (yellow card) 80'	Tajouri 18'; Pöllhuber (yellow card) 32'; Harrer (yellow card) 37'; Netzer (yellow card) 45'	3	21	
12	17 October	H	Grödig	2–1	6,311	Gorgon 20', 43'; Grünwald (yellow card) 75'; Rotpuller (yellow card) 90'	Pichler (yellow card) 36'; Djurić (yellow card) 54' (goal) 77'; Maak (yellow card) 59'; Rasner (yellow card) 70'; Sulimani (yellow card) 85'	2	24	
13	25 October	A	Rapid Wien	2–1	32,200	Martschinko (yellow card) 33'; Hofmann 53' (o.g.); Windbichler (yellow card) 69'; Almer (yellow card) 90'; Vukojević (yellow card) 90+3'	Prosenik 74'; Dibon (yellow card) 84'	2	27	
14	1 November	A	Mattersburg	2–1	7,804	Zulechner (yellow card) 53'; Koch (yellow card) 71'; Kayode 81'; Rotpuller 84'	Höller (yellow card) 50'; Mahrer (yellow card) 64'; Röcher (yellow card) 73'; Templ 85'; Ibser (yellow card) 86'	1	30	
15	7 November	H	Red Bull Salzburg	1–1	11,858	Holzhauser (yellow card) 37'; Zulechner (yellow card) 53'; David de Paula (yellow card) 63'; Friesenbichler 80'; Kahat (yellow card) 87'	Paulo Miranda 24' (yellow card) 38'; Lainer (yellow card) 84'	1	31	
16	21 November	H	Admira Wacker	1–1	6,985	Rotpuller (yellow card) 60'; Kayode 74'	Sax (yellow card) 19'; Wostry (yellow card) 22'; Spiridonović 90+3' (yellow card) 90+3'	1	32	
17	November 29	A	Ried	2–4	3,175	Kahat 11'; Gorgon 22' (pen.); Friesenbichler (yellow card) 72'	Trauner 7' (yellow card) 60'; Murg 15', 54' (yellow card) 30'; Elsneg 32' (pen.); Filipović (yellow card) 50'	2	32	
18	December 2	H	Sturm Graz	2–1	6,612	Kayode (yellow card) 2' (goal) 39'; Gorgon 82'; Hadzikic (yellow card) 90+3'	Horvath 3'; Piesinger (yellow card) 71'	1	35	
19	December 5	A	Wolfsberg	0–2	3,174	Sikov (yellow card) 29'; Meilinger (yellow card) 54'; Serbest (yellow card) 75'	Sílvio 22'; Ouédraogo (yellow card) 30'; Hüttenbrenner 72'	1	35	
20	December 12	H	Rheindorf Altach	1–2	6,051	Vukojević 17'; Martschinko (yellow card) 60'	Martschinko (yellow card) 57'; Ngwat-Mahop 61', 65'; Harrer (yellow card) 74'	2	35	
21	February 6	A	Grödig	0–1	1,436	Kahat (yellow card) 38'; Gorgon 40'; Grünwald (yellow card) 49'; Sikov (yellow card) 90'; Hadžikić (yellow card) 90+1'	Maak (yellow card) 32'; Sulimani (yellow card) 42'; Kainz (yellow card) 64'	2	38	
22	February 14	H	Rapid Wien	0–3	10,590	Kayode (yellow card) 13'; Sikov (yellow card) 13'; Venuto (yellow card) 40'	Murg 9'; Hofmann 14' (pen.), (yellow card) 45'; Jelić (yellow card) 45', (goal) 72'	3	38	
23	February 20	H	Mattersburg	2–2	6,519	Martschinko (yellow card) 7'; Novak 38' (o.g.); Gorgon 43' (pen.); Grünwald (yellow card) 85'	Pink 16'; Malić (yellow card) 29' (yellow-red card) 42'; Mahrer 89'	3	39	
24	February 28	A	Red Bull Salzburg	1–4	9,727	Vukojević (yellow card) 14'; Kayode 17'; Windbichler (yellow card) 57'; Grünwald (yellow card) 85'	Keïta 12', 33'; Soriano 35'; Minamino 70'; Pehlivan (yellow card) 77'	3	39	
25	March 2	A	Admira Wacker	3–0	3,422	Grünwald 17'; Holzhauser (yellow card) 39'; Kayode 55'; Friesenbichler 90'	–	3	42	
26	March 5	H	Ried	3–1	6,249	Vukojević (yellow card) 18'; Rotpuller 59'; Grünwald 64'; Kayode (yellow card) 85', (goal) 90+4'; Gorgon (yellow card) 90+3'	Filipović (yellow card) 10', (goal) 31'; Fröschl (yellow card) 71'	3	45	
27	March 13	A	Sturm Graz	1–1	7,015	Martschinko (yellow card) 33'; Meilinger (yellow card) 44'; Stryger Larsen 64'; Kayode (yellow card) 71'; Holzhauser (yellow card) 89'	Kamavuaka (yellow card) 81'; Edomwonyi 84'	3	46	
28	March 19	H	Wolfsberg	0–0	6,612	–	Zündel (yellow card) 6'; Ouédraogo (yellow card) 41'; Sollbauer (yellow card) 49'; Drescher (yellow card) 77'	3	47	
29	April 2	A	Rheindorf Altach	0–2	5,321	Kayode (yellow card) 38'; Windbichler (yellow card) 41' (red card); Meilinger (yellow card) 82'; Gorgon (yellow card) 82'; Rotpuller (yellow card) 90+4'	Aigner (yellow card) 37', (goal) 42' (pen.); Schreiner 57'	3	47	
30	April 9	H	Grödig	0–2	6,412	Kayode (yellow card) 63'	Strobl (yellow card) 48'; Sulimani 58'; Ofosu (yellow card) 81', (goal) 90'	3	47	
31	April 17	A	Rapid Wien	0–1	25,700		Correa 58'	3	47	
32	April 23	A	Mattersburg	9–0	5,665	Gorgon 10', 35' (pen.), (yellow card) 20'; Serbest (yellow card) 24'; Kayode 36'; Grünwald 51', 69'; Rotpuller (yellow card) 72'; Friesenbichler 76', 90+3'; Venuto 87' de Paula 90'	Prietl (red card) 42'; Kuster (red card) 43'	3	50	
33	May 1	H	Red Bull Salzburg	0–2	6,821	Martschinko (yellow card) 26'	Schwegler (yellow card) 27'; Lazaro 37'; Ulmer (yellow card) 70'; Reyna 90'	3	50	
34	May 7	H	Admira Wacker	3–1	7,055	Gorgon 14', 61'; Venuto 24'	Toth (yellow card) 33'; Ebner (yellow card) 44'; Wostry 59'	3	53	
35	May 11	A	Ried	5–0	3,817	Gorgon 17', 25'; Holzhauser 56'; Grünwald 62'; Rotpuller (yellow card) 85'; Venuto 87'	–	3	56	
36	May 15	H	Sturm Graz	3–0	8,982	Vukojević (yellow card) 26'; Windbichler (yellow card) 44'; Grünwald (yellow card) 70'; Friesenbichler 86', (yellow card) 87'; Kayode 90', (yellow card) 90'; Holzhauser 90+3'	Potzmann (yellow card) 22' (yellow-red card) 42'; Stanković (yellow card) 45'; Kayhan (yellow card) 45+1'; Avdijaj (yellow card) 45+2'; Kamavuaka (yellow card) 692'	3	59	

== Austrian Cup ==
=== Austrian Cup review ===
In the opening match of the season, on 17 July, Austria won 3–0 with goals from Alexander Grünwald, Alexander Gorgon, and Philipp Zulechner.

=== Austrian Cup Fixtures and results ===
Rd	Date	H/A	Opponent	Res. F–A	Att.	Goalscorers and disciplined players		Ref.
Rd	Date	H/A	Opponent	Res. F–A	Att.	Austria Wien	Opponent	Ref.
1	17 July	A	Oberwart	3–0	2,500	Grünwald 32'; Gorgon 67'; Kehat (yellow card) 74'; Rotpuller (yellow card) 82'; Zulechner 85'	Ziger (yellow card) 48'; Penzinger (yellow card) 81'	
2	23 September	A	FC Wels	7–0	2,000	Rotpuller 1'; Serbest 14'; Hsani 18' (o.g.); Gorgon 22'; Friesenbichler 28'; Sikov (yellow card) 55'; Meilinger 57'; Salamon (red card) 84'; Vukojević 86'	Gölemez (yellow card) 51'; Mavraj (yellow card) 84'; Duvnjak (yellow card) 90'	
3	4 November	H	Rheindorf Altach	2–1	4,805	Friesenbichler 21', 82'; Salamon (yellow card) 73'; Grünwald (yellow card) 90+1'	Hofbauer 8'; César Ortiz (yellow card) 41'; Zwischenbrugger (yellow card) 55'; Prokopič (yellow card) 68'; Kobras (yellow card) 88'	
4	9 February	H	LASK Linz	1–0	5,204	Friesenbichler 21' (yellow card) 69'; Lucas Venuto (yellow card) 31'; Serbest (yellow card) 52'; Holzhauser (yellow card) 64'	Niko Dovedan (yellow card) 37'; Ramsebner (yellow card) 44'; Ullmann (yellow card) 55'; Cabrera (yellow card) 74'	
5	20 April	A	FC Red Bull Salzburg	2–5	6,173	Venuto 12', (yellow card) 50'; Grünwald (yellow card) 78', (goal) 82'; Holzhauser (yellow card) 60'; Kayode (yellow card) 65'; Serbest (yellow card) 75'; Friesenbichler (yellow card) 85'; Martschinko (yellow card) 90'	Soriano 57'; Ulmer 60'; Stryger Larsen 72' (o.g.); Laimer 81', 87'	

== Friendly matches ==
=== Friendly fixtures and results ===
Rd	Date	H/A	Opponent	Res. F–A	Att.	Goalscorers and disciplined players		Ref.
Rd	Date	H/A	Opponent	Res. F–A	Att.	Austria Wien	Opponent	Ref.
1	26 June	A	Guntersdorf	5–0				
2	7 July	H	FC Krasnodar	0–0				
3	9 July	H	Union Berlin	1–0				
4	12 July	H	FC Zürich	0–1				
5	12 November	H	Kapfenberger SV	2–2				
6	15 January	H	Werder Bremen	2–2				
7	19 January	A	Heidenheim	0–2				
8	21 January	A	Universitatea Craiova	3–1				
9	27 January	H	Horn	1–0				
10	29 January	H	Basel	3–1				

== Player information ==
=== Squad and statistics ===
As of 15 June 2016

No.	Pos	Nat	Player	Total		Bundesliga		Austrian Cup	
No.	Pos	Nat	Player	Apps	Goals	Apps	Goals	Apps	Goals
32	GK	(Austria) AUT	Patrick Pentz	1	0	1	0	0	0
31	GK	(Austria) AUT	Osman Hadžikić	16	0	13	0	3	0
1	GK	(Austria) AUT	Robert Almer	24	0	22	0	2	0
17	DF	(Denmark) DEN	Jens Stryger Larsen	13	1	11	1	2	0
3	DF	(Austria) AUT	Richard Windbichler	28	0	25	0	3	0
28	DF	(Austria) AUT	Christoph Martschinko	35	0	33	0	2	0
18	DF	(Czech Republic) CZE	Patrizio Stronati	5	0	3	0	2	0
30	DF	(Austria) AUT	Fabian Koch	25	1	22	1	3	0
25	DF	(Austria) AUT	Thomas Salamon	5	0	3	0	2	0
33	DF	(Austria) AUT	Lukas Rotpuller	37	3	32	2	5	1
4	DF	(North Macedonia) MKD	Vanče Šikov	28	1	26	1	2	0
22	DF	(Austria) AUT	Marco Stark	1	0	1	0	0	0
26	MF	(Austria) AUT	Raphael Holzhauser	38	4	35	4	3	0
10	MF	(Austria) AUT	Alexander Grünwald	37	11	33	9	4	2
16	MF	(Austria) AUT	Dominik Prokop	6	1	5	1	1	0
15	MF	(Austria) AUT	Tarkan Serbest	24	1	19	0	5	1
19	MF	(Israel) ISR	Roi Kahat	30	1	28	1	2	0
7	MF	(Austria) AUT	Marco Meilinger	23	2	18	1	5	1
6	MF	(Austria) AUT	Mario Leitgeb	3	0	1	0	2	0
23	MF	(Spain) ESP	David de Paula	21	1	20	1	1	0
5	MF	(Croatia) CRO	Ognjen Vukojević	23	2	19	1	4	1
8	FW	(Nigeria) NGR	Olarenwaju Kayode	37	13	34	13	3	0
11	FW	(Brazil) BRA	Lucas Venuto	17	4	15	3	2	1
20	FW	(Austria) AUT	Alexander Gorgon	40	21	35	19	5	2
9	FW	(Austria) AUT	Kevin Friesenbichler	35	11	31	6	4	5
16	FW	(Austria) AUT	Philipp Zulechner	15	1	13	0	2	1
27	FW	(Austria) AUT	Marko Kvasina	3	0	3	0	0	0
