= 2017–18 FK Austria Wien season =

FK Austria Wien
2017–18 season
- Chairman: Wolfgang Katzian
- Manager: Thorsten Fink
- Stadium: Franz Horr Stadium
- Bundesliga: 7th
- Austrian Cup: 3rd round
- UEFA Europa League: Group stage
- Top goalscorer: League: Raphael Holzhauser (10); All: Raphael Holzhauser (13)
- Highest home attendance: 31,409 (vs A.C. Milan, September 14, 2017)
- Lowest home attendance: 2,214 (vs SKN St. Pölten, November 29, 2017)
- Average home league attendance: 7,015
Home colours	Away colours

The 2017–18 FK Austria Wien season was the 106th season in the club's history.

== Bundesliga ==
=== League table ===
Pos	Team	Pld	W	D	L	GF	GA	GD	Pts	Qualification or relegation
5	Admira Wacker Mödling	36	15	6	15	59	66	−7	51	Qualification for the Europa League second qualifying round (Note: Sturm Graz qualified for the Europa League third qualifying round by winning the 2017–18 Austrian Cup. However, since they already qualified for European competition based on their league position, the spot awarded to the cup winners was passed down the league.)
6	Mattersburg	36	12	10	14	50	56	−6	46	
7	Austria Wien	36	12	7	17	51	55	−4	43	
8	Rheindorf Altach	36	10	8	18	35	51	−16	38	
9	Wolfsberger AC	36	8	9	19	31	57	−26	33	

Source: weltfussball.de (in German)
Rules for classification: 1) Points; 2) Goal difference; 3) Goals scored; 4) Matches won; 5) Away matches won; 6) Head-to-head points; 7) Head-to-head goal difference; 8) Head-to-head goals scored.

=== Results summary ===
Overall								Home						Away					
Pld	W	D	L	GF	GA	GD	Pts	W	D	L	GF	GA	GD	W	D	L	GF	GA	GD
36	12	7	17	51	55	−4	43	8	3	7	33	25	+8	4	4	10	18	30	−12

Last updated: 25 July 2017.

=== Bundesliga fixtures and results ===
Win Draw Loss

MD	Date	H/A	Opponent	Res. F–A	Att.	Goalscorers		Table	
MD	Date	H/A	Opponent	Res. F–A	Att.	Austria Wien	Opponent	Pos.	Pts.
1	23 July	A	Rheindorf Altach	0–3	5,273		Aigner 1'; Dobras 9'; Grbić 68'	9	0
2	30 July	H	Sturm Graz	2–3	6,184	Zulj 83' (o.g.); Holzhauser 88' (pen.)	Huspek 33'; Zulj 56'; Schmid 86'	10	0
3	6 August	A	Rapid Vienna	2–2	26,000	Prokop 73'; Holzhauser 85' (pen.)	Schaub 39', 55'; Schrammel (red card) 84'	9	1
4	12 August	H	LASK Linz	2–2	6,512	Friesenbichler 60'; Felipe Pires 90+4'		7	4
5	20 August	A	SV Mattersburg	3–1	4,500	Friesenbichler 19'; Monschein 84', 90+2'	Höller 52', (red card) 59'	4	7
6	27 August	A	Admira Wacker	3–1	3,300	Felipe Pires 28'; Maier 48' (o.g.); Maier 48' (o.g.); Lee 77'	Kalajdžić 88'	3	10
7	9 September	H	Wolfsberger AC	2–2	5,878	Klein 45'; Holzhauser 58'	Sollbauer 23'; Orgill 90+2'	4	11
8	17 September	H	SKN St. Pölten	5–1	4,424	Friesenbichler 23', 81'; Felipe Pires 45'; Holzhauser 79' (pen.); Monschein 90+3'	Riski 25'; Ambichl (red card) 57'; Huber (yellow card) 79' (red card)	3	14
9	24 September	A	Red Bull Salzburg	0–0	8,107			3	15
10	1 October	H	Rheindorf Altach	2–0	8,107	Alhassan 72'; Friesenbichler 87'	Netzer (red card) 82'	3	18
11	15 October	A	Sturm Graz	0–3	11,345		Alar 27', 56'; Mohammed 30' (o.g.)	4	18
12	22 October	H	Rapid Vienna	0–1	14,189		Schobesberger 55'; Galvão (red card) 81'	4	18
13	28 October	A	LASK Linz	2–2	5,613	Holzhauser 15'; Felipe Pires 43'	Michorl 71', 84' (pen.)	4	19
14	5 November	A	SV Mattersburg	1–3	5,892	Friesenbichler 45+2'	Perlak 53'; Okugawa 79'; Prevljak 81'	5	19
15	18 November	H	Admira Wacker	2–3	6,350	Friesenbichler 69'; Felipe Pires 63'	Wostry 37'; Knasmüllner 67', 88'	6	19
16	26 November	A	Wolfsberger AC	2–1	3,500	Friesenbichler 58'; Holzhauser 90+2'; Mohammed (red card) 66'	Drescher 50'	5	22
17	29 November	A	SKN St. Pölten	0–1	2,214		Hofbauer 60'	6	22
18	3 December	H	Red Bull Salzburg	1–1	6,150	Monschein 90+4'	Ulmer 79'	5	23
19	10 December	A	Rheindorf Altach	0–1	2,717		Grbić 32'	7	23
20	17 December	H	Sturm Graz	1–0	6,404	Alar 53' (o.g.)		6	26
21	4 February	A	Rapid Vienna	1–1	25,600	Monschein 62'	Ljubicic 64'	6	27
22	10 February	H	LASK Linz	1–3	5,575	Felipe Pires 15'	Goiginger 36'; Berisha 80'; Luckeneder 89'	6	27
23	17 February	A	SV Mattersburg	1–2	3,600	Venuto 38'	Prevljak 3', 87'	7	27
24	24 February	A	Admira Wacker	1–2	2,400	Madl 16'	Schmidt 20'; Grozurek 74'	7	27
25	3 March	H	Wolfsberger AC	2–0	5,012	Holzhauser 18'; Prokop 53'; Serbest (yellow card) 83' (red card)		7	30
26	10 March	H	SKN St. Pölten	4–0	6,055	Klein 12', 85'; Monschein 37'; Madl 73'		7	33
27	18 March	A	Red Bull Salzburg	0–5	7,026		Ramalho 17'; Minamino 59', 67'; Klein 72' (o.g.); Onguéné 90'	7	33
28	31 March	H	Rheindorf Altach	2–1	6,089	Holzhauser 17' (pen.); Felipe Pires 87'	Honsak 55'	6	36
29	7 April	A	Sturm Graz	0–2	11,318	Holzhauser 5', 34'		6	39
30	15 April	H	Rapid Vienna	0–4	11,260		Schwab 8'; Murg 42'; Schobesberger 51'; Kvilitaia 73'	6	39
31	21 April	A	LASK Linz	0–1	5,604		Goiginger 87'	6	39
32	28 April	H	SV Mattersburg	2–3	5,420	Prokop 7'; Grünwald 14'	Okugawa 9'; Prevljak 28'; Gruber 90+2'	7	39
33	5 May	H	Admira Wacker	0–0	6,050			7	40
34	15 May	A	Wolfsberger AC	1–2	2,639	Prokop 61'	Frieser 43', 45'	7	40
35	20 May	A	SKN St. Pölten	0–2	3,083		Ljubicic 7'; Atanga 67'	7	40
36	27 May	H	Red Bull Salzburg	4–0	4,300	Monschein 29'; Prokop 37'; Stronati 58'; Fitz 85'		7	43

== Austrian Cup ==
=== Austrian Cup Fixtures and results ===
Rd	Date	H/A	Opponent	Res. F–A	Att.	Goalscorers	
Rd	Date	H/A	Opponent	Res. F–A	Att.	Austria Wien	Opponent
1	14 July	A	ASK Ebreichsdorf	0–0 (a.e.t)	3,000	Holzhauser (red card) 43'	
1	14 July	A	ASK Ebreichsdorf	0–0 (a.e.t)	3,000	Penalty shoot-out	
1	14 July	A	ASK Ebreichsdorf	0–0 (a.e.t)	3,000	Stryger Larsen (penalty scored); Filipović (penalty scored); Felipe Pires (penalty scored); Westermann (penalty missed); Grünwald (penalty scored)	(penalty scored) Gusić; (penalty scored) Pomer; (penalty missed) Markic; (penalty scored) Bauer; (penalty missed) Vukajlovic
2	21 September	A	Union Vöcklamarkt	3–0	2,050	Prokop 29'; Ruan 70'; Holzhauser 75' (pen.)	
3	25 October	H	Rapid Vienna	1–2	14,652	Alhassan 51'	Murg 41'; Schobesberger 78'

== Europa League ==
=== Qualifying rounds ===
Rd	Date	H/A	Opponent	Res. F–A	Att.	Goalscorers	
Rd	Date	H/A	Opponent	Res. F–A	Att.	Austria Wien	Opponent
Q3 L1	27 July	H	AEL Limassol	0–0	5,892		
Q3 L2	2 August	A	AEL Limassol	2–1	9,000	Holzhauser 34' (pen.); Felipe Pires 90'	Aldair 60'; Airosa (red card) 27'
Austria Wien won 2-1 on aggregate.
Q4 L1	17 August	A	NK Osijek	2–1	15,000	Monschein 26'; Holzhauser 60'	Ejupi 15'
Q4 L2	24 August	H	NK Osijek	0–1	8,000		Boban 62'
2-2 on aggregate, Austria Wien won on away goals.

=== Group stage ===
Pos	Team	Pld	W	D	L	GF	GA	GD	Pts	Qualification	MIL	AEK	RJK	AW
1	(Italy) Milan	6	3	2	1	13	6	+7	11	Advance to knockout phase	—	0–0	3–2	5–1
2	(Greece) AEK Athens	6	1	5	0	6	5	+1	8	Advance to knockout phase	0–0	—	2–2	2–2
3	(Croatia) Rijeka	6	2	1	3	11	12	−1	7		2–0	1–2	—	1–4
4	Austria Wien	6	1	2	3	9	16	−7	5		1–5	0–0	1–3	—

Source: UEFA
Rules for classification: Group stage tiebreakers

Rd	Date	H/A	Opponent	Res. F–A	Att.	Goalscorers	
Rd	Date	H/A	Opponent	Res. F–A	Att.	Austria Wien	Opponent
GpD 1	14 September	H	AC Milan	1–5	31,409	Borkovic 47'	Çalhanoğlu 7'; Silva 10', 20', 56'; Suso 63'
GpD 2	28 September	A	AEK Athens	2–2	16,954	Monschein 43'; Tajouri 49'	Livaja 28', 90'
GpD 3	19 October	H	HNK Rijeka	1–3	20,690	Friesenbichler 90'	Gavranović 21', 31'; Kvržić 90+2'
GpD 4	2 November	A	HNK Rijeka	4–1	7,912	Prokop 41', 62'; Serbest 73'; Monschein 83'	Pavičić 61'; Mišić (red card) 73'
GpD 5	23 November	A	AC Milan	1–5	17,932	Rodríguez 27'; Silva 36', 70'; Cutrone 42', 90'	Monschein 21'
GpD 6	7 December	A	AEK Athens	0-0	23,133		

== Player information ==
=== Squad and statistics ===
As of 1 June 2018

No.	Pos	Nat	Player	Total		Bundesliga		Austrian Cup		Europa League	
No.	Pos	Nat	Player	Apps	Goals	Apps	Goals	Apps	Goals	Apps	Goals
31	GK	(Austria) AUT	Osman Hadžikić	19	0	12	0	2	0	5	0
32	GK	(Austria) AUT	Patrick Pentz	30	0	24	0	1	0	5	0
17	DF	(Denmark) DEN	Jens Stryger Larsen	8	0	4	0	1	0	3	0
4	DF	(Croatia) CRO	Petar Filipović	7	0	4	0	1	0	2	0
30	DF	(Austria) AUT	Michael Madl	11	2	11	2	0	0	0	0
28	DF	(Austria) AUT	Christoph Martschinko	15	0	8	0	1	0	6	0
17	DF	(Austria) AUT	Florian Klein	25	3	21	3	1	0	3	0
91	DF	(Austria) AUT	Stefan Stangl	10	0	10	0	0	0	0	0
22	DF	(Czech Republic) CZE	Patrizio Stronati	4	1	4	1	0	0	0	0
6	DF	(Ghana) GHA	Abdul Kadiri Mohammed	32	0	22	0	1	0	9	0
4	DF	(Brazil) BRA	Ruan	7	1	6	0	1	1	0	0
25	DF	(Austria) AUT	Thomas Salamon	33	0	25	0	3	0	5	0
2	DF	(Austria) AUT	Petar Gluhakovic	14	0	10	0	1	0	3	0
24	DF	(Austria) AUT	Alexandar Borkovic	14	1	11	0	0	0	3	1
19	DF	(Austria) AUT	Michael Blauensteiner	11	0	10	0	0	0	1	0
-	DF	(Germany) GER	Heiko Westermann	19	0	10	0	2	0	7	0
-	DF	(Austria) AUT	Marco Stark	3	0	2	0	1	0	0	0
-	DF	(Croatia) CRO	Marko Pejić	1	0	1	0	0	0	0	0
26	MF	(Austria) AUT	Raphael Holzhauser	41	13	28	10	3	1	10	2
10	MF	(Austria) AUT	Alexander Grünwald	12	1	9	1	1	0	2	0
16	MF	(Austria) AUT	Dominik Prokop	42	8	30	5	3	1	9	2
15	MF	(Austria) AUT	Tarkan Serbest	40	1	28	0	2	0	10	1
8	MF	(Nigeria) NGR	Abdullahi Ibrahim Alhassan	26	2	20	1	2	1	4	0
21	MF	(South Korea) KOR	Lee Jin-hyun	18	1	13	1	2	0	3	0
23	MF	(Spain) ESP	David de Paula	32	0	22	0	2	0	8	0
-	MF	(Austria) AUT	David Cancola	2	0	1	0	0	0	1	0
39	MF	(Austria) AUT	Manprit Sarkaria	8	0	5	0	1	0	2	0
36	MF	(Austria) AUT	Dominik Fitz	7	1	7	1	0	0	0	0
5	MF	(Austria) AUT	Vesel Demaku	9	0	9	0	0	0	0	0
11	FW	(Brazil) BRA	Lucas Venuto	15	1	14	1	0	0	1	0
95	FW	(Brazil) BRA	Felipe Pires	45	8	32	7	3	0	10	1
9	FW	(Austria) AUT	Kevin Friesenbichler	39	9	30	8	1	0	8	1
7	FW	(Libya) LBA	Ismael Tajouri	29	1	17	0	3	0	9	1
14	FW	(Austria) AUT	Christoph Monschein	45	11	32	7	3	0	10	4
43	FW	(Austria) AUT	Toni Vastić	4	0	4	0	0	0	0	0
50	FW	(Austria) AUT	Alexander Frank	3	0	3	0	0	0	0	0

== Transfers ==
=== In ===
Pos.	Name	Age	Nationality	Moving from	Type	Transfer Window	Transfer fee
FW	Kevin Friesenbichler	23	Austria	(Portugal) Benfica	Transfer	Summer	£630,000
FW	Christoph Monschein	24	Austria	Admira Wacker	Transfer	Summer	£540,000
DF	Florian Klein	30	Austria	(Germany) VfB Stuttgart	Free transfer	Summer	Free
DF	Heiko Westermann	33	Germany	(Netherlands) Ajax	Free transfer	Summer	Free
DF	Ruan	23	Brazil	(Brazil) Guaratinguetá	Loan	Summer	Undisclosed
MF	Abdullahi Ibrahim Alhassan	20	Nigeria	(Nigeria) Akwa United	Loan	Summer	Undisclosed
MF	Vesel Demaku	17	Austria	Red Bull Salzburg	Transfer	Summer	Undisclosed
MF	Lee Jin-hyun	19	South Korea	(South Korea) Pohang Steelers	Loan	Summer	Undisclosed
DF	Stefan Stangl	26	Austria	Red Bull Salzburg	Loan	Winter	Undisclosed
DF	Michael Madl	29	Austria	(England) Fulham	Transfer	Winter	£675,0000

=== Out ===
Pos.	Name	Age	Nationality	Moving from	Type	Transfer Window	Transfer fee
FW	Olarenwaju Kayode	24	Nigeria	(England) Manchester City	Transfer	Summer	£3,420,000
DF	Jens Stryger Larsen	26	Denmark	(Italy) Udinese	Transfer	Summer	£1,350,000
DF	Petar Filipović	26	Croatia	(Turkey) Konyaspor	Transfer	Summer	£1,130,000
FW	Marko Kvasina	20	Austria	(Netherlands) Twente	Free transfer	Summer	Free
GK	Tino Casali	21	Austria	SV Mattersburg	Free transfer	Summer	Free
MF	David Cancola	20	Austria	Wiener Neustadt	Loan	Summer	Undisclosed
MF	Ognjen Vukojević	33	Croatia		Retired	Summer	
FW	Ismael Tajouri	23	Libya	(United States) New York City	Transfer	Winter	Undisclosed
DF	Heiko Westermann	34	Germany		Retired		
