= Ismael Tajouri-Shradi =

Footballer (born 1994)

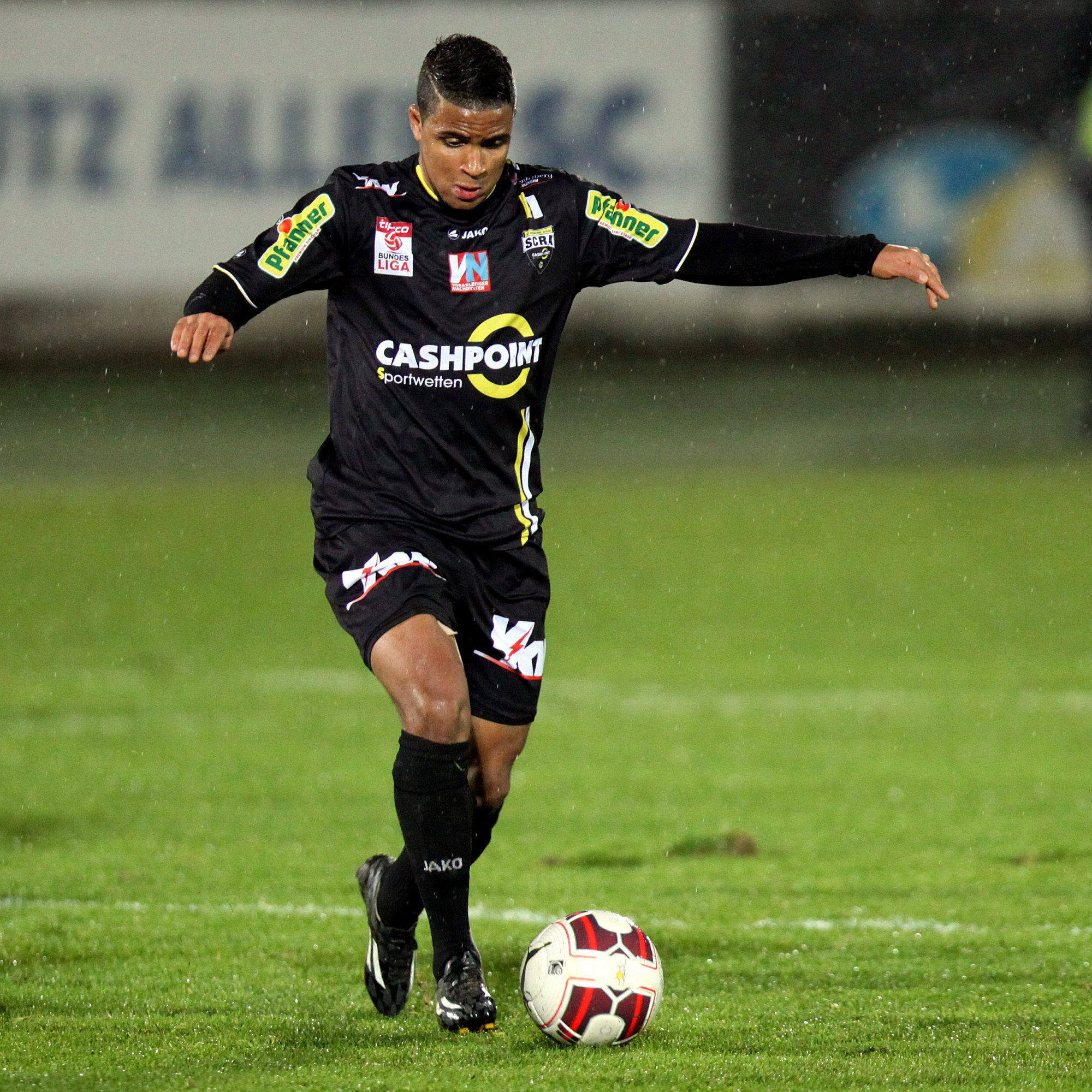
- Tajouri-Shradi with Rheindorf Altach in 2014

Personal information
- Full name: Ismael Tajouri-Shradi
- Date of birth: 28 March 1994 (age 32)
- Place of birth: Bern, Switzerland
- Height: 1.68 m (5 ft 6 in)
- Positions: Attacking midfielder; winger

Team information
- Current team: Al-Ahli Tripoli
- Number: 24

Senior career*
Years	Team	Apps	(Gls)
2011–2016	Austria Wien II	50	(11)
2013–2018	Austria Wien	49	(8)
2014–2016	→ Rheindorf Altach (loan)	62	(9)
2014–2016	→ Rheindorf Altach II (loan)	3	(2)
2018–2021	New York City FC	84	(26)
2022	Los Angeles FC	6	(2)
2022	New England Revolution	0	(0)
2023	Omonia	11	(1)
2023	Minnesota United	10	(1)
2024–2025	Asswehly	15	(1)
2025–	Al-Ahli Tripoli	11	(3)

International career^{‡}
2012	Libya U20	1	(0)
2018–	Libya	6	(0)
- * Club domestic league appearances and goals as of 23 April 2025 ‡ National team caps and goals as of 28 March 2023

Ismael Tajouri-Shradi (born 28 March 1994) is a professional footballer who plays as an attacking midfielder for Libyan Premier League club Al-Ahli Tripoli. Born in Switzerland, he plays for the Libya national team.

== Early life ==
Tajouri-Shradi was born in Bern, Switzerland, to Libyan parents. His father was a diplomat. He moved to Austria at the age of 9, and received Austrian nationality in July 2015. He has always considered himself Libyan.

== Club career ==
Shradi spent his early career at Austria Wien, coming up through the youth ranks in 2013 before going on loan to Rheindorf Altach. After two and a half years at Altach, Shradi returned to Austria Wien and became a regular starter.

Shradi signed with Major League Soccer (MLS) club New York City FC on 12 January 2018. In his debut season, he scored 11 league goals while also contributing 3 assists.

On 14 December 2021, Tajouri-Shradi was selected by Charlotte FC in the 2021 MLS Expansion Draft and was immediately traded to Los Angeles FC in exchange for $400,000 in General Allocation Money. He was traded again on 5 August 2022, joining New England Revolution in exchange for $400,000 In General Allocation Money.

On 4 January 2023, Tajouri-Shradi joined Cypriot club Omonia. He left as Cup winner at the end of the season, having scored one goal in 14 appearances for the club.

On 5 July 2023 Tajouri-Shradi returned to the MLS with Minnesota United as a free agent. He signed until the end of the 2023 season.

== International career ==
Shradi debuted for the Libyan under-20s in a friendly with the Morocco under-20s in the summer of 2012.

He debuted for the Libya senior national team in a 0–0 2019 Africa Cup of Nations qualification tie with South Africa on 8 September 2018.

== Personal life ==
In February 2019, Tajouri-Shradi earned a U.S. green card which qualifies him as a domestic player for MLS roster purposes.

== Career statistics ==
=== Club ===
As of match played 8 October 2023

Appearances and goals by club, season and competition
Club	Season	League			Cup		Continental		Other		Total	
Club	Season	Division	Apps	Goals	Apps	Goals	Apps	Goals	Apps	Goals	Apps	Goals
Austria Wien II	2011–12	Regionalliga	9	1	—		—		—		9	1
Austria Wien II	2012–13	Regionalliga	27	6	—		—		—		27	6
Austria Wien II	2013–14	Regionalliga	12	3	—		—		—		12	3
Austria Wien II	2015–16	Regionalliga	2	1	—		—		—		2	1
Austria Wien II	Total		50	11	0	0	0	0	0	0	50	11
Austria Wien	2015–16	Bundesliga	0	0	0	0	—		—		0	0
Austria Wien	2016–17	Bundesliga	32	8	4	2	10 (Note: Appearance(s) in UEFA Europa League)	0	—		46	10
Austria Wien	2017–18	Bundesliga	17	0	3	0	9	1	—		29	1
Austria Wien	Total		49	8	7	2	19	1	0	0	75	11
Rheindorf Altach (loan)	2013–14	2. Liga	15	4	—		—		—		15	4
Rheindorf Altach (loan)	2014–15	Bundesliga	28	4	3	1	—		—		31	5
Rheindorf Altach (loan)	2015–16	Bundesliga	19	1	2	0	—		—		21	1
Rheindorf Altach (loan)	Total		62	5	5	1	0	0	0	0	67	6
Rheindorf Altach II (loan)	2014–15	Regionalliga	2	1	—		—		—		2	1
Rheindorf Altach II (loan)	2015–16	Regionalliga	1	1	—		—		—		1	1
Rheindorf Altach II (loan)	Total		3	2	0	0	0	0	0	0	3	2
New York City FC	2018	MLS	27	11	0	0	—		3 (Note: Appearance(s) in MLS Cup Playoffs)	1	30	12
New York City FC	2019	MLS	19	5	2	1	—		1	1	22	7
New York City FC	2020	MLS	15	3	—		3 (Note: Appearance(s) in CONCACAF Champions League)	0	2 (Note: One appearance in MLS is Back Tournament knockout stage, one appearance in MLS Cup Playoffs)	0	20	3
New York City FC	2021	MLS	23	7	—		1 (Note: Appearance(s) in Leagues Cup)	0	3	0	26	7
New York City FC	Total		84	26	2	1	4	0	9	2	98	29
Los Angeles FC	2022	MLS	6	2	—		—		—		6	2
AC Omonia	2022-23	First Division	11	1	3	0	—		—		14	1
Minnesota United FC	2023	MLS	10	1	—		1	0	—		11	1
Career total			275	56	17	4	23	1	9	2	325	63

=== International ===
As of match played 28 March 2023

Appearances and goals by national team and year
National team	Year	Apps	Goals
Libya	2018	3	0
Libya	2019	1	0
Libya	2020	—	
Libya	2021	—	
Libya	2022	—	
Libya	2023	2	0
Total		6	0

== Honours ==
New York City FC

- MLS Cup: 2021

Omonia

- Cypriot Cup: 2022–23
