= Osman Hadžikić =

Austrian footballer

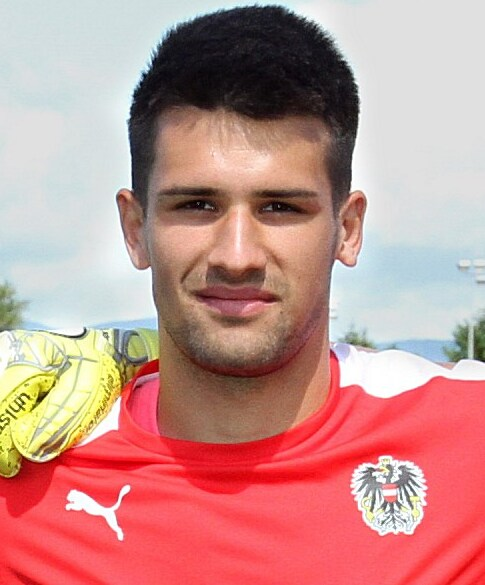
- Hadžikić with Austria U21 in 2017

Personal information
- Date of birth: 12 March 1996 (age 30)
- Place of birth: Klosterneuburg, Austria
- Height: 1.86 m (6 ft 1 in)
- Position: Goalkeeper

Team information
- Current team: Slaven Belupo
- Number: 31

Youth career
- 2004–2010: SV Schwechat
- 2010–2011: Austria Wien

Senior career*
Years	Team	Apps	(Gls)
2011–2016	Austria Wien II	75	(0)
2014–2018	Austria Wien	57	(0)
2019–2020	FC Zürich	0	(0)
2020	→ Inter Zaprešić (loan)	5	(0)
2020–2022	Admira Wacker II	5	(0)
2020–2022	Admira Wacker	0	(0)
2023–2025	Velež Mostar	67	(0)
2025–	Slaven Belupo	29	(0)

International career
2014–2015	Austria U19	5	(0)
2017–2018	Austria U21	5	(0)
- * Club domestic league appearances and goals as of 17 May 2026

Osman Hadžikić (born 12 March 1996) is a professional footballer who plays as a goalkeeper for Slaven Belupo.

== Club career ==
Hadžikić came through Austria Wien youth setup, having debuted for the first team on 11 April 2015 against Grödig, aged only 19.

== International career ==
Hadžikić represents Austria under-21, having previously played for Austria under-19, but also has Bosnian citizenship and is eligible to play for Bosnia and Herzegovina.

== Personal life ==
Osman has a younger brother, Nihad, who is also a footballer.

== Career statistics ==
=== Club ===
As of match played 17 May 2026

Appearances and goals by club, season and competition
Club	Season	League			National cup (Note: Includes Austrian Cup, Bosnian Cup)		Continental		Total	
Club	Season	Division	Apps	Goals	Apps	Goals	Apps	Goals	Apps	Goals
Austria Wien II	2011–12	Regionalliga Ost	17	0	—		—		17	0
Austria Wien II	2012–13	Regionalliga Ost	17	0	—		—		17	0
Austria Wien II	2013–14	Regionalliga Ost	19	0	—		—		19	0
Austria Wien II	2014–15	Regionalliga Ost	7	0	—		—		7	0
Austria Wien II	2015–16	Regionalliga Ost	12	0	—		—		12	0
Austria Wien II	2016–17	Regionalliga Ost	2	0	—		—		2	0
Austria Wien II	2017–18	Regionalliga Ost	1	0	—		—		1	0
Austria Wien II	Total		75	0	—		—		75	0
Austria Wien	2014–15	Austrian Bundesliga	5	0	1	0	—		6	0
Austria Wien	2015–16	Austrian Bundesliga	13	0	3	0	—		16	0
Austria Wien	2016–17	Austrian Bundesliga	27	0	2	0	6 (Note: Appearance(s) in UEFA Europa League)	0	35	0
Austria Wien	2017–18	Austrian Bundesliga	12	0	1	0	5	0	18	0
Austria Wien	Total		57	0	7	0	11	0	75	0
Zürich	2018–19	Swiss Super League	0	0	—		—		0	0
Zürich	2019–20	Swiss Super League	0	0	—		—		0	0
Zürich	Total		0	0	—		—		0	0
Inter Zaprešić (loan)	2019–20	Croatian Football League	5	0	—		—		5	0
Admira Wacker	2020–21	Austrian Bundesliga	0	0	0	0	—		0	0
Admira Wacker	2021–22	Austrian Bundesliga	0	0	0	0	—		0	0
Admira Wacker	Total		0	0	0	0	—		0	0
Admira Wacker II	2021–22	Regionalliga Ost	5	0	—		—		5	0
Velež Mostar	2022–23	Bosnian Premier League	11	0	3	0	—		14	0
Velež Mostar	2023–24	Bosnian Premier League	32	0	0	0	—		32	0
Velež Mostar	2024–25	Bosnian Premier League	24	0	2	0	2 (Note: Appearance(s) in UEFA Conference League)	0	28	0
Velež Mostar	Total		67	0	5	0	2	0	74	0
Slaven Belupo	2025–26	Croatian Football League	29	0	0	0	—		29	0
Career total			237	0	12	0	13	0	262	0
