= Kevin Friesenbichler =

Austrian footballer

Personal information
- Full name: Kevin Friesenbichler
- Date of birth: 6 May 1994 (age 32)
- Place of birth: Weiz, Austria
- Height: 1.88 m (6 ft 2 in)
- Position: Forward

Team information
- Current team: DSV Leoben
- Number: 30

Youth career
- 2000–2008: SC Weiz
- 2008–2009: Austria Wien
- 2009–2010: Admira Mödling
- 2010–2012: Bayern Munich

Senior career*
Years	Team	Apps	(Gls)
2012–2014	Bayern Munich II	34	(16)
2014–2017	Benfica B	0	(0)
2014–2015	→ Lechia Gdańsk (loan)	17	(5)
2015–2016	→ Austria Wien (loan)	31	(6)
2016–2017	→ Austria Wien (loan)	32	(5)
2017–2019	Austria Wien	43	(10)
2019	→ Wolfsberger AC (loan)	12	(2)
2019–2020	VfL Osnabrück	6	(0)
2020–2021	Sturm Graz	36	(4)
2021–2023	RFS	41	(11)
2023	Lechia Gdańsk	12	(0)
2023–	DSV Leoben	37	(12)

International career
2009	Austria U16	6	(10)
2010	Austria U17	5	(3)
2011	Austria U18	2	(0)
2012	Austria U19	5	(3)
2013–2016	Austria U21	19	(8)
- * Club domestic league appearances and goals as of 28 December 2024

Kevin Friesenbichler (born 6 May 1994) is an Austrian professional footballer who plays as a forward for 2. Liga club DSV Leoben.

== Club career ==
Born in Weiz, Friesenbichler joined local team SC Weiz at the age of five before joining Austrian giants FK Austria Wien in 2008. After a year he moved on to Admira Mödling and in 2010, he joined German heavyweight Bayern Munich. For the then 16-year-old Bayern even paid a transfer fee believed to be €500,000. He enjoyed a debut hat-trick for their U17 side and spent subsequently three years playing for their U19 squad, scoring 27 goals in 37 appearances. His impressive form lead him to be promoted to FC Bayern Munich II for the 2012–13 Regionalliga season. However, it was the 2013–14 season that he arrived at the scene, scoring 15 goals in 22 appearances as Bayern Munich II topped their table.

On 22 May 2014, Friesenbichler signed a four-year deal with Portuguese champions Benfica on a free transfer. On 26 July 2014, he scored his first goal for Benfica B on his debut in a friendly match win (4–3) against Ajax II.

On 22 August 2014, after not even two months at Benfica, Friesenbichler was loaned to Polish side Lechia Gdańsk on a season-long deal. According to his father he wouldn't have had many chances to play for Benfica and was therefore looking to pick up match practice. He made his professional debut on 31 August 2014 against Ruch Chorzów (3–3), also scoring his first goal in process.

On 22 July 2015, Friesenbichler was loaned to Austria Wien for one season. Exactly a year later, the loan was extended by a further season. On 1 July 2017, he signed a permanent deal with the Austrian club.

On 2 July 2019, Friesenbichler joined VfL Osnabrück on a two-year deal.

In June 2023, Friesenbichler returned to Austria with DSV Leoben following a short spells in Latvia and Poland with RFS and Lechia Gdańsk respectively.

== International career ==
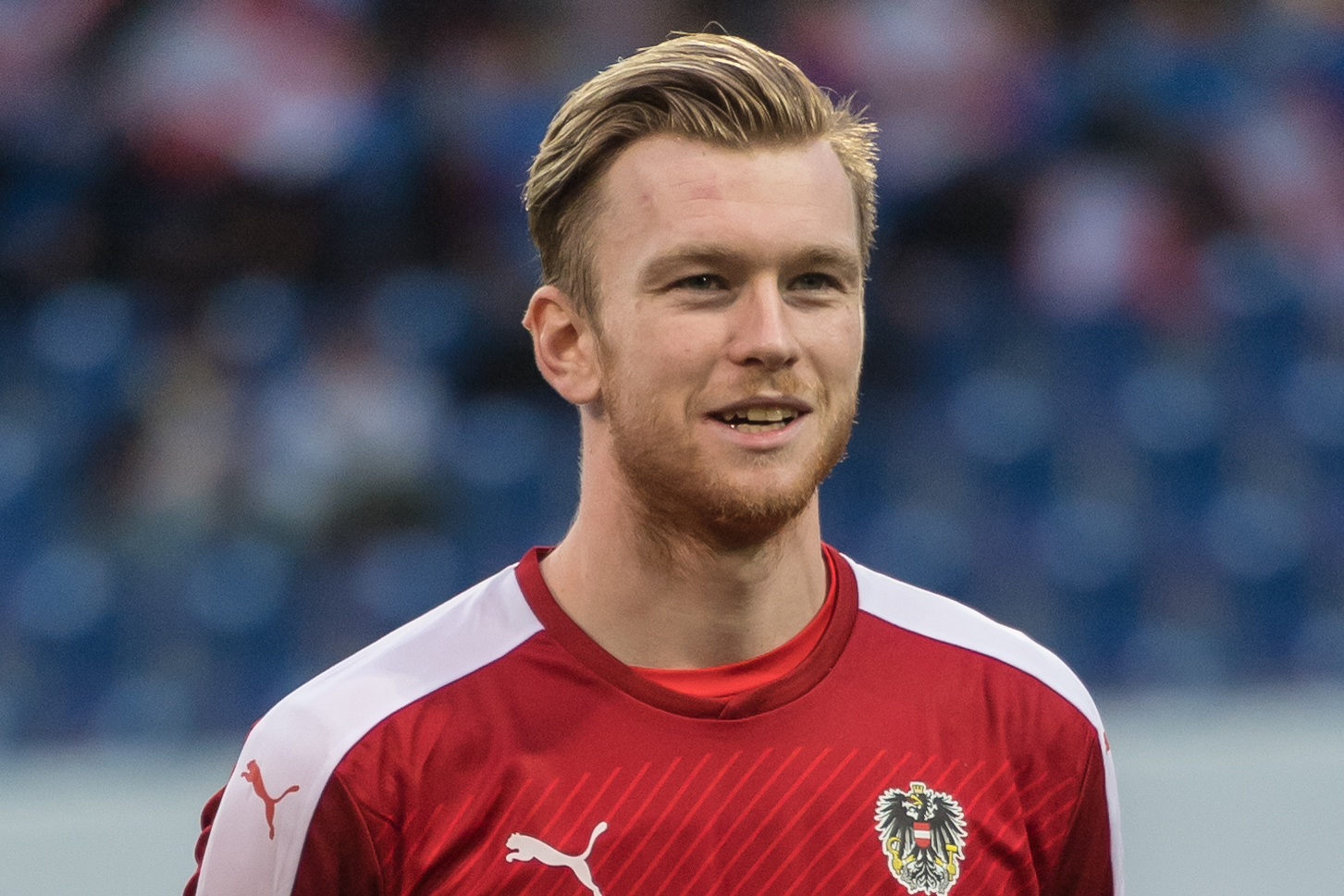
Friesenbichler with Austria U21 in 2016

On 14 August 2009, Friesenbichler made his debut for Austria U16 in an 8–0 victory over Liechtenstein U16, scoring 2 goals. He made his debut in competitive youth level international football on 18 November 2013 against Hungary in a 4–2 victory, in which he scored 1 goal.

== Career statistics ==
As of match played 3 May 2024

Appearances and goals by club, season and competition
Club	Season	League			National Cup		Continental		Other		Total	
Club	Season	Division	Apps	Goals	Apps	Goals	Apps	Goals	Apps	Goals	Apps	Goals
Bayern Munich II	2011–12	Regionalliga Bayern	0	0	—		—		—		0	0
Bayern Munich II	2012–13	Regionalliga Bayern	12	1	—		—		—		12	1
Bayern Munich II	2013–14	Regionalliga Bayern	22	15	—		—		2 (Note: Appearances in the Regionalliga playoff)	0	24	15
Bayern Munich II	Total		34	16	—		—		2	0	36	16
Benfica	2014–15	Primeira Liga	0	0	0	0	0	0	—		0	0
Lechia Gdańsk (loan)	2014–15	Ekstraklasa	17	5	0	0	—		—		17	5
Austria Wien (loan)	2015–16	Austrian Bundesliga	31	6	4	4	—		—		35	10
Austria Wien (loan)	2016–17	Austrian Bundesliga	32	5	3	3	9 (Note: Appearances in the UEFA Europa League)	2	—		44	10
Austria Wien	2017–18	Austrian Bundesliga	30	8	1	0	8	1	—		39	9
Austria Wien	2018–19	Austrian Bundesliga	13	2	3	2	—		—		16	4
Austria Wien	Total		106	21	11	9	17	3	0	0	134	33
Wolfsberger AC	2018–19	Austrian Bundesliga	12	2	0	0	—		—		12	2
VfL Osnabrück	2019–20	2. Bundesliga	6	0	1	0	—		—		7	0
Sturm Graz	2019–20	Austrian Bundesliga	12	0	1	0	—		—		13	0
Sturm Graz	2020–21	Austrian Bundesliga	24	4	5	1	—		—		29	5
Sturm Graz	Total		36	4	6	1	0	0	0	0	42	5
FK RFS	2021	Latvian Higher League	9	3	4	2	6 (Note: Appearances in the UEFA Europa Conference League)	1	—		19	6
FK RFS	2022	Latvian Higher League	32	8	1	0	11 (Note: Appearances in the UEFA Champions League and UEFA Europa Conference League)	2	—		44	10
FK RFS	Total		41	11	5	2	17	3	0	0	63	16
Lechia Gdańsk	2022–23	Ekstraklasa	12	0	0	0	—		—		12	0
DSV Leoben	2023–24	2. Liga	20	8	3	1	—		—		23	9
Career Total			284	67	26	13	34	6	2	0	346	86

== Honours ==
RFS

- Latvian Higher League: 2021
- Latvian Football Cup: 2021
