= Alexander Grünwald =

Austrian footballer

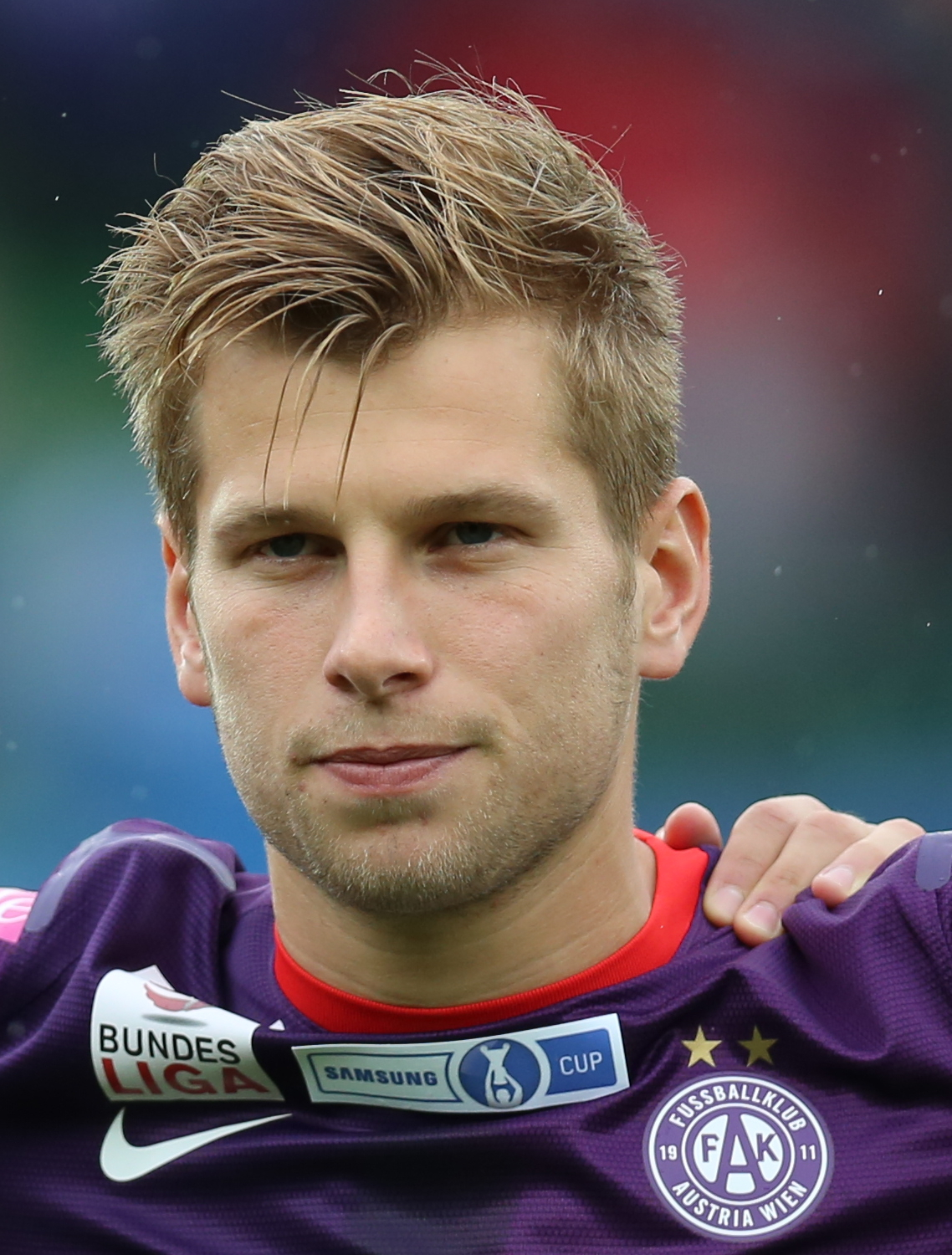
- Grünwald with Austria Wien in May 2013

Personal information
- Date of birth: 1 May 1989 (age 37)
- Place of birth: Klagenfurt, Austria
- Height: 1.88 m (6 ft 2 in)
- Position: Attacking midfielder

Senior career*
Years	Team	Apps	(Gls)
2006–2008	Austria Wien	1	(0)
2008–2011	Wiener Neustadt	74	(9)
2008	→ Wienerberg (loan)	5	(3)
2011–2022	Austria Wien	265	(60)
- * Club domestic league appearances and goals

Alexander Grünwald (born 1 May 1989) is an Austrian former professional footballer who played as an attacking midfielder.

== Career ==
Grünwald made his professional debut with the reserve team of Austria Wien in the First League.

== Career statistics ==
As of match played on 5 October 2020.

Appearances and goals by club, season and competition
Club	Season	League			Austrian Cup		Europe		Total	
Club	Season	League	Apps	Goals	Apps	Goals	Apps	Goals	Apps	Goals
Austria Wien (A)	2006–07	First League	5	2	—		—		5	2
Austria Wien (A)	2007–08	First League	19	4	—		—		19	4
Austria Wien (A)	Total		24	6	0	0	0	0	24	6
Austria Wien	2007–08	Austrian Bundesliga	1	0	0	0	0	0	1	0
Wiener Neustadt	2008–09	First League	13	1	3	0	—		16	1
Wiener Neustadt	2009–10	Austrian Bundesliga	28	2	5	2	—		33	4
Wiener Neustadt	2010–11	Austrian Bundesliga	33	6	1	0	—		34	6
Wiener Neustadt	Total		74	9	9	2	0	0	83	11
Wienerberg	2008–09	Regional League East	5	3	—		—		5	3
Austria Wien	2011–12	Bundesliga	22	3	4	0	9	1	35	4
Austria Wien	2012–13	Bundesliga	26	7	5	1	—		31	8
Austria Wien	2013–14	Bundesliga	13	2	1	1	3	0	17	3
Austria Wien	2014–15	Bundesliga	31	7	6	4	—		37	11
Austria Wien	2015–16	Bundesliga	33	9	4	2	—		37	11
Austria Wien	2016–17	Bundesliga	36	11	2	0	9	4	47	15
Austria Wien	2017–18	Bundesliga	9	1	1	0	2	0	12	1
Austria Wien	2018–19	Bundesliga	22	8	3	1	2	0	27	9
Austria Wien	2019–20	Bundesliga	29	7	2	3	2	0	33	10
Austria Wien	2020-21	Bundesliga	4	2	0	0	0	0	4	2
Austria Wien	Total		225	58	28	12	27	5	290	74
Austria Wien (A)	2013–14	Regional League East	2	0	—		—		2	0
Career total			329	75	37	14	27	5	395	94
