= Lukas Prokop =

Austrian footballer (born 1999)

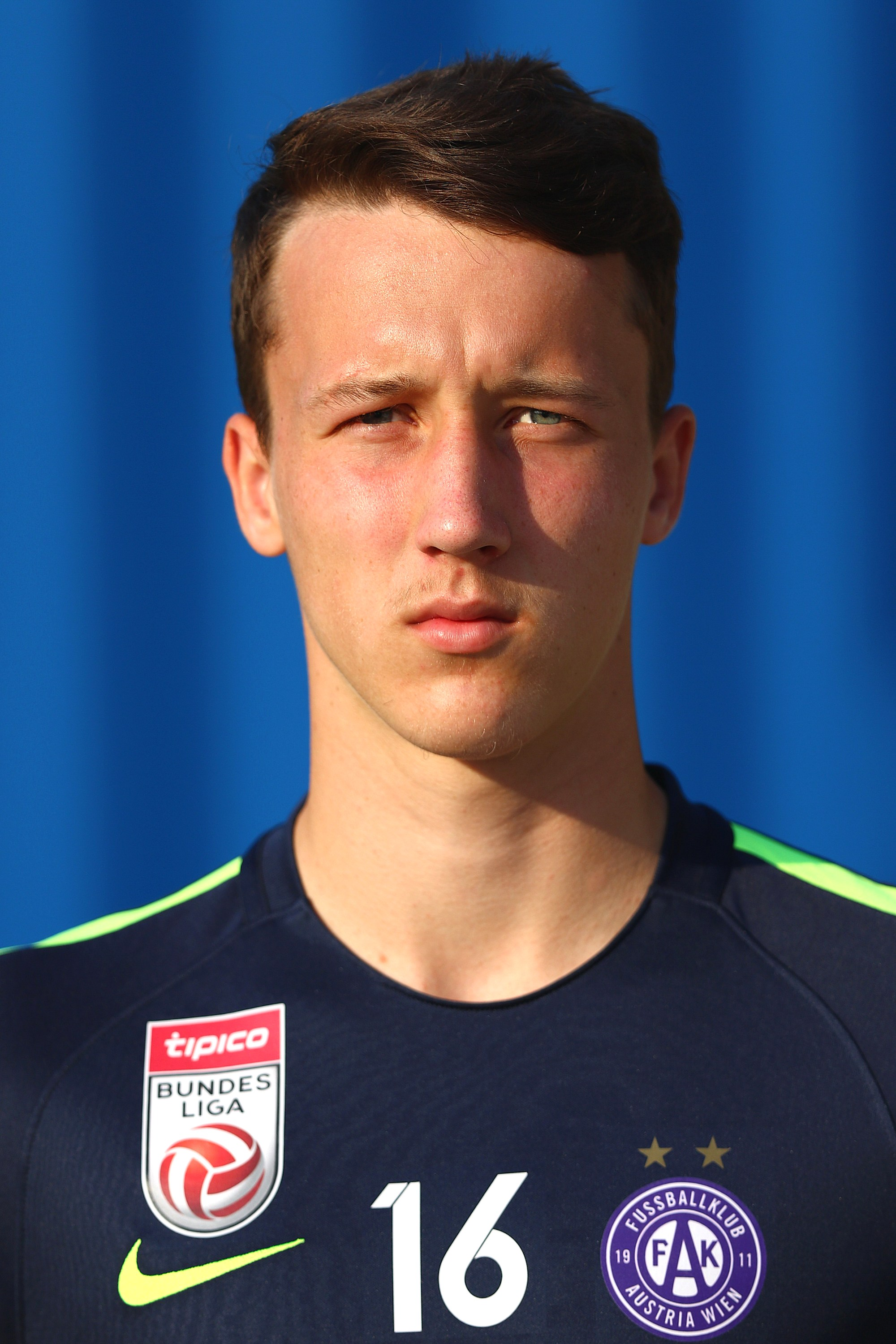
- Prokop in August 2018

Personal information
- Date of birth: 26 April 1999 (age 27)
- Place of birth: Vienna, Austria
- Height: 1.71 m (5 ft 7 in)
- Position: Left-back

Team information
- Current team: Vorwärts Steyr
- Number: 3

Youth career
- 2006–2017: Austria Wien

Senior career*
Years	Team	Apps	(Gls)
2017–2021	Austria Wien II	76	(1)
2021–2022	Rheindorf Altach	8	(0)
2022–2023	Rheindorf Altach Juniors	20	(0)
2023	DSV Leoben	14	(0)
2023–	Vorwärts Steyr	33	(1)
- * Club domestic league appearances and goals as of 28 December 2024

Lukas Prokop (born 26 April 1999) is an Austrian professional footballer who plays as a left-back for Vorwärts Steyr.

== Career ==
Prokop began his footballing career with Austria Wien, progressing through all youth levels of the club. Ahead of the 2016–17 season, he was promoted to the reserve team. In October 2017, he made his debut in Austrian Regionalliga when he was in the starting lineup on the 15th matchday of the 2017–18 season against Karabakh Wien. At the end of the season he won promotion 2. Liga with Austria Wien II.

He made his debut in the second division in July 2018, when he came off the bench for Stefan Sulzer in the 55th minute of the first matchday of the 2018–19 season against Kapfenberger SV. In three second division seasons with the team he made 75 appearances, in which he scored one goal.

On 28 May 2021, Prokop joined Austrian Football Bundesliga club Rheindorf Altach on a two-year contract.

On 15 December 2022, Prokop signed with DSV Leoben, with contract beginning in January 2023.

On 17 July 2023, Prokop signed with Vorwärts Steyr.

== Personal life ==
Prokop's older brother, Dominik, is also a professional footballer.
