= Jens Stryger =

Danish footballer (born 1991)

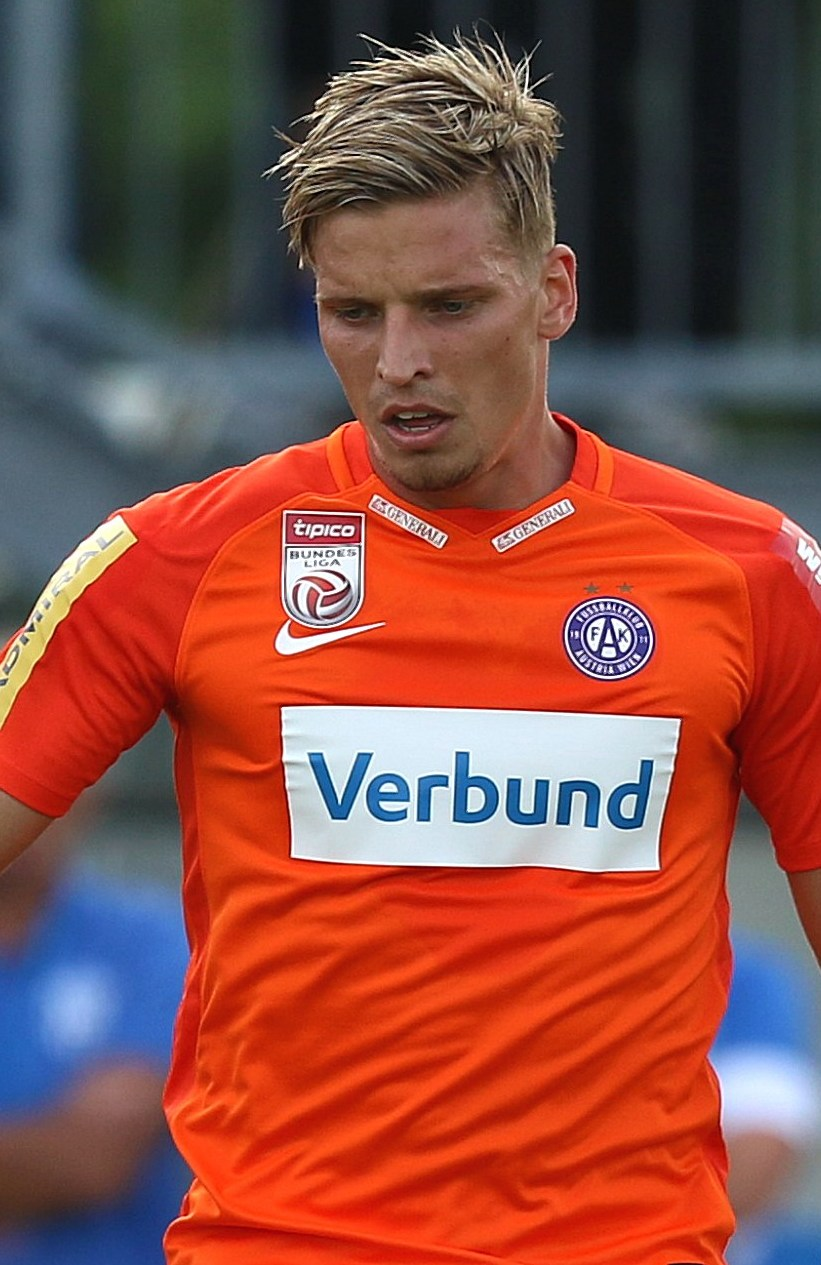
- Stryger with Austria Wien in 2017

Personal information
- Full name: Jens Stryger Larsen
- Date of birth: 21 February 1991 (age 35)
- Place of birth: Sakskøbing, Denmark
- Height: 1.80 m (5 ft 11 in)
- Position: Right-back

Team information
- Current team: Malmö FF
- Number: 17

Youth career
- Frem Sakskøbing
- 2002–2004: B 1921
- 2004–2006: Herfølge Boldklub
- 2006–2009: Brøndby

Senior career*
Years	Team	Apps	(Gls)
2009–2013	Brøndby	91	(6)
2013–2014	Nordsjælland	30	(2)
2014–2017	Austria Wien	63	(2)
2017–2022	Udinese	143	(5)
2022–2024	Trabzonspor	48	(1)
2024–	Malmö FF	72	(3)

International career
2007	Denmark U16	2	(0)
2007–2008	Denmark U17	12	(1)
2008–2009	Denmark U18	4	(0)
2009–2010	Denmark U19	20	(6)
2010–2011	Denmark U21	7	(0)
2016–2023	Denmark	54	(3)
- * Club domestic league appearances and goals as of 19 September 2026

Jens Stryger Larsen (Danish pronunciation: [ˈjens stʁyɐ̯ ˈlɑːsn̩]; born 21 February 1991) is a Danish professional footballer who plays as a defender for Allsvenskan club Malmö FF.

== Club career ==
=== Brøndby ===
Stryger made his debut for Brøndby IF starting against FC Nordsjælland in November 2009 before being replaced by Jan Kristiansen after an hour. During his time at Brøndby, he quickly became very popular among Brøndby supporters because of his energy, and in the end of the 2009–2010 season and at the beginning of the 2010–2011 season he featured regularly in Brøndby's team, keeping players such as Sweden international Alexander Farnerud on the bench. In August 2010 he was named as one of the greatest talents in Denmark by the Danish media, and at 23 September, Danish football magazine Tipsbladet reported interest in him from Serie A club Genoa.

=== FC Nordsjælland ===
On 9 July 2013, Stryger joined division rivals FC Nordsjælland on a free transfer, signing a three-year deal. He was a regular during his time in Nordsjælland, playing 30 matches in the Superliga during the 2013–14 season.

=== Austria Wien ===
On 18 June 2014, Stryger was signed by Austrian Football Bundesliga side Austria Wien on a four-year deal. He made his debut for the club on the first day of the 2014–15 season in a match against SV Grödig.

=== Udinese ===
On 24 August 2017, Stryger joined Italian club Udinese on a four-year contract. He scored his first goal for I Bianconeri on 27 September in a Serie A match against Roma. He soon became a first team regular at Udinese.

On 19 January 2020, Stryger scored and assisted in a 3–2 loss against Milan, his goal being scored from a tight angle after a poor clearance by Milan-goalkeeper Gianluigi Donnarumma.

=== Trabzonspor ===
In June 2022, Stryger joined Trabzonspor in Turkey.

=== Malmö FF ===
In January 2024, Stryger signed a three-year contract with Swedish club Malmö FF.

== International career ==
Stryger was called up to the senior Denmark national team to face Liechtenstein and Armenia in August 2016. He made his debut in the friendly match against Liechtenstein on 31 August 2016, and he scored the final goal in Denmark's 5–0 victory.

In June 2018, he was named in manager Åge Hareide's squad for the 2018 FIFA World Cup in Russia.

In June 2021, Stryger was included in manager Kasper Hjulmand's squad for the rescheduled 2020 UEFA Euro, where Denmark reached the semi-finals.

== Career statistics ==
=== Club ===
As of match played 19 September 2026

Appearances and goals by club, season and competition
Club	Season	League			National cup (Note: Includes Danish Cup, Austrian Cup, Coppa Italia, Turkish Cup)		Continental		Other		Total	
Club	Season	Division	Apps	Goals	Apps	Goals	Apps	Goals	Apps	Goals	Apps	Goals
Brøndby	2009–10	Danish Superliga	15	0	0	0	—		—		15	0
Brøndby	2010–11	Danish Superliga	20	2	1	0	6 (Note: Appearance in UEFA Europa League)	0	—		27	2
Brøndby	2011–12	Danish Superliga	26	1	1	0	2	0	—		29	1
Brøndby	2012–13	Danish Superliga	30	3	4	1	—		—		34	4
Brøndby	Total		91	6	6	1	8	0	—		105	7
Nordsjælland	2013–14	Danish Superliga	30	2	4	1	4 (Note: Two appearances in UEFA Champions League, two appearances in UEFA Europa League)	0	—		38	3
Austria Wien	2014–15	Austrian Bundesliga	19	1	2	0	—		—		21	1
Austria Wien	2015–16	Austrian Bundesliga	11	1	2	0	—		—		13	1
Austria Wien	2016–17	Austrian Bundesliga	29	0	2	0	12	0	—		43	0
Austria Wien	2017–18	Austrian Bundesliga	4	0	1	0	3	0	—		8	0
Austria Wien	Total		63	2	7	0	15	0	—		85	2
Udinese	2017–18	Serie A	30	1	2	0	—		—		32	1
Udinese	2018–19	Serie A	36	1	1	0	—		—		37	1
Udinese	2019–20	Serie A	33	1	3	0	—		—		36	1
Udinese	2020–21	Serie A	33	2	2	0	—		—		35	2
Udinese	2021–22	Serie A	11	0	1	0	—		—		12	0
Udinese	Total		143	5	9	0	—		—		152	5
Trabzonspor	2022–23	Süper Lig	32	1	3	0	9 (Note: Two appearances in UEFA Champions League, five appearances in UEFA Europa League, two appearances and one goal in UEFA Europa Conference League)	1	1 (Note: Appearance in Turkish Super Cup)	1	45	3
Trabzonspor	2023–24	Süper Lig	16	0	1	0	—		—		17	0
Trabzonspor	Total		48	1	4	0	9	1	1	1	62	3
Malmö	2024	Allsvenskan	24	0	4	1	11 (Note: Six appearances in UEFA Champions League, five appearances in UEFA Europa League)	0	—		39	1
Malmö	2025	Allsvenskan	28	2	2	0	15 (Note: Six appearances in UEFA Champions League, nine appearances in UEFA Europa League)	0	—		45	2
Malmö	2026	Allsvenskan	20	1	1	0	—		—		21	1
Malmö	Total		72	3	7	1	26	0	—		105	4
Career total			447	19	37	3	61	1	1	1	546	24

=== International ===
As of match played 7 September 2023

Appearances and goals by national team and year
National team	Year	Apps	Goals
Denmark	2016	2	1
Denmark	2017	7	0
Denmark	2018	11	0
Denmark	2019	9	0
Denmark	2020	2	0
Denmark	2021	16	1
Denmark	2022	2	1
Denmark	2023	5	0
Total		54	3

Scores and results list Denmark's goal tally first, score column indicates score after each Stryger goal.

List of international goals scored by Jens Stryger
No.	Date	Venue	Opponent	Score	Result	Competition
1	31 August 2016	Forum Horsens Arena, Horsens, Denmark	Liechtenstein	5–0	5–0	Friendly
2	28 March 2021	MCH Arena, Herning, Denmark	Moldova	4–0	8–0	2022 FIFA World Cup qualification
3	6 June 2022	Ernst-Happel-Stadion, Vienna, Austria	Austria	2–1	2–1	2022–23 UEFA Nations League A
