= Raphael Holzhauser =

Austrian footballer

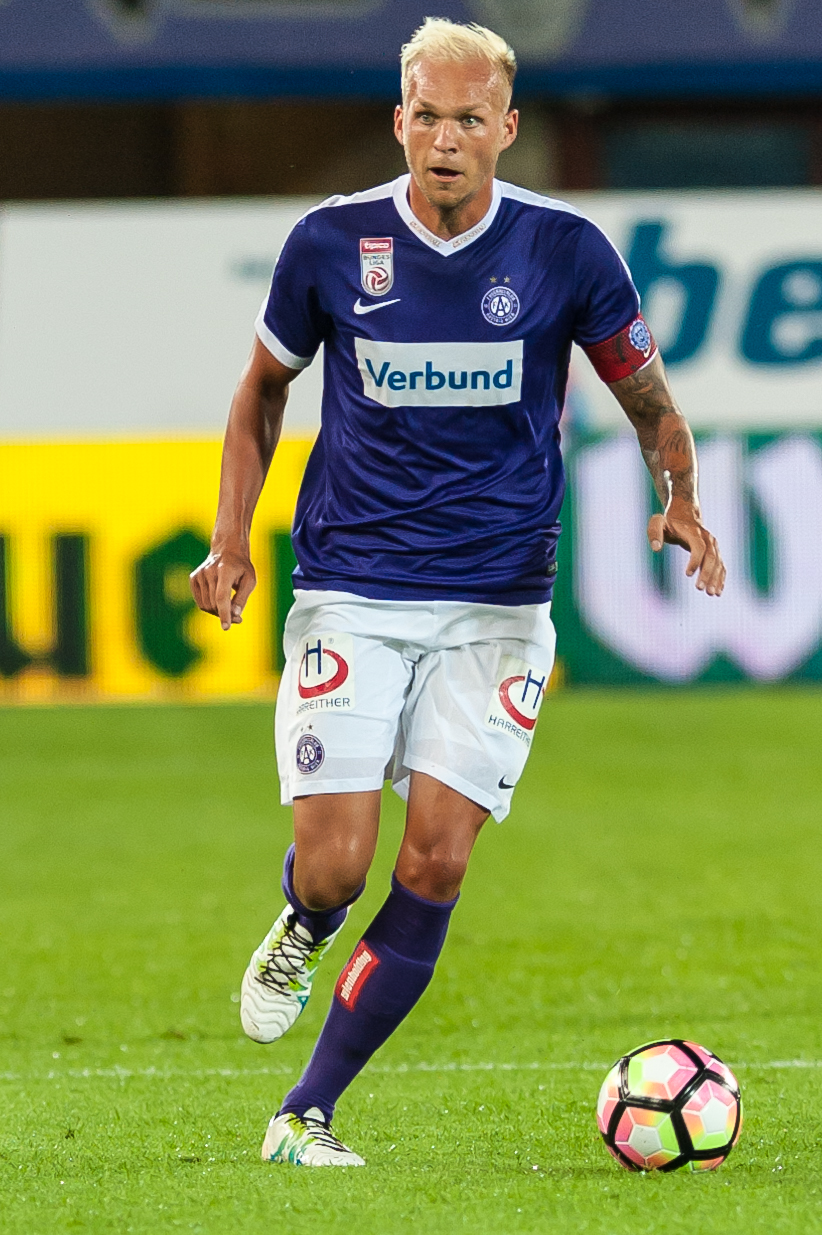
- Holzhauser in 2016

Personal information
- Date of birth: 16 February 1993 (age 33)
- Place of birth: Wiener Neustadt, Austria
- Height: 1.93 m (6 ft 4 in)
- Position: Attacking midfielder

Team information
- Current team: KSK Beveren

Youth career
- 1999–2003: ATSV Teesdorf
- 2003–2009: Rapid Wien
- 2009–2011: Stuttgart

Senior career*
Years	Team	Apps	(Gls)
2010–2015	VfB Stuttgart II	77	(11)
2012–2015	VfB Stuttgart	23	(0)
2013–2014	→ FC Augsburg (loan)	13	(0)
2014	→ FC Augsburg II (loan)	2	(2)
2015–2018	Austria Wien	114	(22)
2018–2019	Grasshoppers	21	(3)
2019–2022	Beerschot	75	(26)
2022–2024	OH Leuven	16	(1)
2023	→ TSV 1860 Munich (loan)	14	(3)
2024	Swift Hesperange	14	(10)
2024	Marsaxlokk	8	(0)
2025–2026	Gloggnitz	0	(0)
2026–	KSK Beveren	47	(9)

International career^{‡}
2008–2009	Austria U16	4	(1)
2009–2010	Austria U17	10	(5)
2009–2010	Austria U19	5	(1)
2009–2013	Austria U21	28	(11)
2020	Austria	2	(0)
- * Club domestic league appearances and goals as of 20 June 2026 ‡ National team caps and goals as of 20:21, 18 January 2021 (UTC)

Raphael Holzhauser (born 16 February 1993) is an Austrian professional footballer who plays as an attacking midfielder. He is currently playing for First Provincial Division East-Flanders club KSK Beveren.

== Club career ==
Holzhauser was born in Wiener Neustadt, Austria. Before the 2010–11 season, he joined Stuttgart's second team, playing in the 3. Liga. On 21 January 2012, he made his Bundesliga debut for VfB Stuttgart against Schalke.

On 1 July 2013, Holzhauser was loaned out to fellow Bundesliga side FC Augsburg until June 2014.

After his return from Augsburg, he was excluded from the first team squad and had to play for the reserve team in 3. Liga for the first half of the 2014–15 campaign. In total he made 77 matches for VfB Stuttgart II and finally moved to Austria Wien on 22 January 2015.

In May 2018, with Holzhauser's Austria Wien contract running out, it was announced Holzhauser would join Swiss Super League side Grasshopper Club Zürich on a free transfer for the 2018–19 season. He agreed a two-year deal with Grasshoppers. On 2 April 2019, it was confirmed, that Holzhauser's contract had been terminated by mutual consent.

On 19 June 2019, Holzhauser signed a two-year contract with Belgian club Beerschot.

On 3 June 2022, Holzhauser was announced at OH Leuven on a two-year contract. On 11 January 2023, he joined TSV 1860 Munich until the end of the season, with 1860 Munich having the option to purchase him permanently at the end of the season. On 15 January 2024, Holzhauser left the club after playing 16 times for the club, scoring once and assisting four times.

On 30 January 2024, Holzhauser joined Swift Hesperange in Luxembourg.

== International career ==
Holzhauser was also a member of the several Austrian national youth football teams. He debuted with the senior Austria national team in a friendly 2–1 win over Greece on 7 October 2020.

== Career statistics ==
=== Club ===
As of 9 January 2024

Appearances and goals by club, season and competition
Club	Season	League			National cup (Note: Includes DFB-Pokal, Austrian Cup, Swiss Cup, Belgian Cup)		Europe		Total	
Club	Season	Division	Apps	Goals	Apps	Goals	Apps	Goals	Apps	Goals
VfB Stuttgart II	2010–11	3. Liga	31	5	0	0	–		31	5
VfB Stuttgart II	2011–12	3. Liga	29	4	0	0	–		29	4
VfB Stuttgart II	2012–13	3. Liga	2	0	0	0	–		2	0
VfB Stuttgart II	Total		62	9	0	0	–		62	9
VfB Stuttgart	2011–12	Bundesliga	2	0	1	0	–		3	0
VfB Stuttgart	2012–13	Bundesliga	21	0	2	0	7 (Note: Appearances in UEFA Europa League)	0	30	0
VfB Stuttgart	Total		23	0	3	0	7	0	33	0
FC Augsburg	2013–14	Bundesliga	13	0	3	0	–		16	0
Austria Wien	2014–15	Austrian Bundesliga	16	1	1	0	–		17	1
Austria Wien	2015–16	Austrian Bundesliga	35	3	3	0	–		38	3
Austria Wien	2016–17	Austrian Bundesliga	35	8	3	0	12	4	50	12
Austria Wien	2017–18	Austrian Bundesliga	28	10	3	1	10	2	41	13
Austria Wien	Total		114	22	10	1	22	6	146	29
Grasshoppers	2018–19	Swiss Super League	21	3	1	0	–		24	3
Beerschot	2019–20	Belgian First Division B	29	7	2	1	–		31	8
Beerschot	2020–21	Belgian First Division A	32	16	0	0	–		32	16
Beerschot	2021–22	Belgian First Division A	14	3	1	1	–		15	4
Beerschot	Total		75	26	3	2	0	0	78	28
Oud-Heverlee Leuven	2022–23	Belgian Pro League	14	1	1	0	–		15	1
1860 Munich	2022–23	3. Liga	14	3	0	0	–		14	3
Oud-Heverlee Leuven	2023–24	Belgian Pro League	2	0	1	0	–		3	0
Career total			338	64	22	3	29	6	389	73

=== International ===
As of match played 11 November 2020

Appearances and goals by national team and year
National team	Year	Apps	Goals
Austria	2020	2	0
Total		2	0
