= Markus Wostry =

Austrian footballer

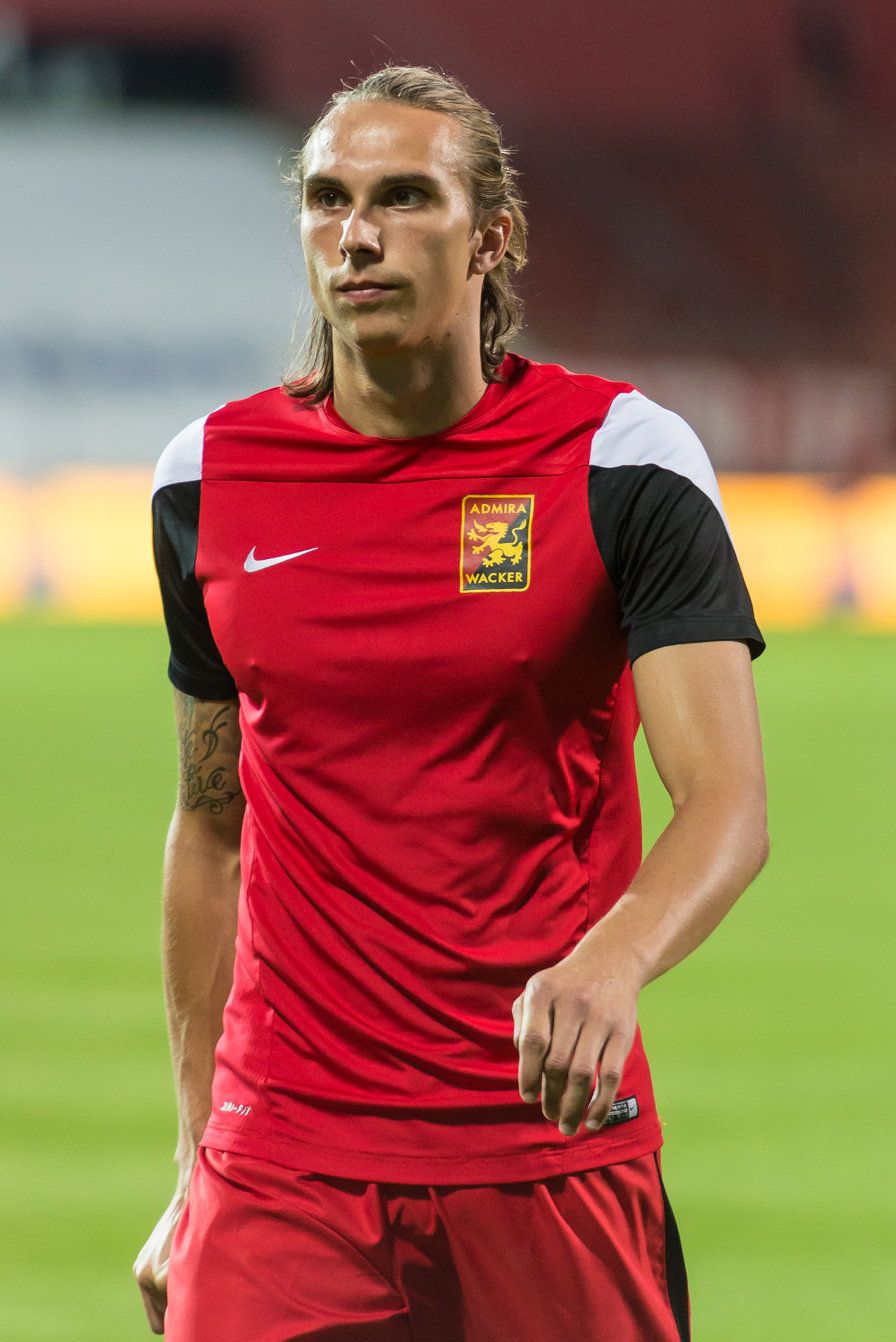
- Wostry in 2016

Personal information
- Date of birth: 19 July 1992 (age 34)
- Place of birth: Vienna, Austria
- Height: 1.84 m (6 ft 0 in)
- Position: Centre back

Senior career*
Years	Team	Apps	(Gls)
2010–2015	Admira Wacker II	89	(5)
2010–2018	Admira Wacker	100	(5)
2018–2020	LASK	19	(2)
2020–2021	Wacker Innsbruck	10	(0)
2021–2022	First Vienna	6	(1)
- * Club domestic league appearances and goals as of 27 May 2022

Markus Wostry (born 19 July 1992) is an Austrian footballer.

== Club career ==
On 21 August 2020, he joined Wacker Innsbruck.

On 6 July 2021, he moved to First Vienna.
