= Olarenwaju Kayode =

Nigerian footballer (born 1993)

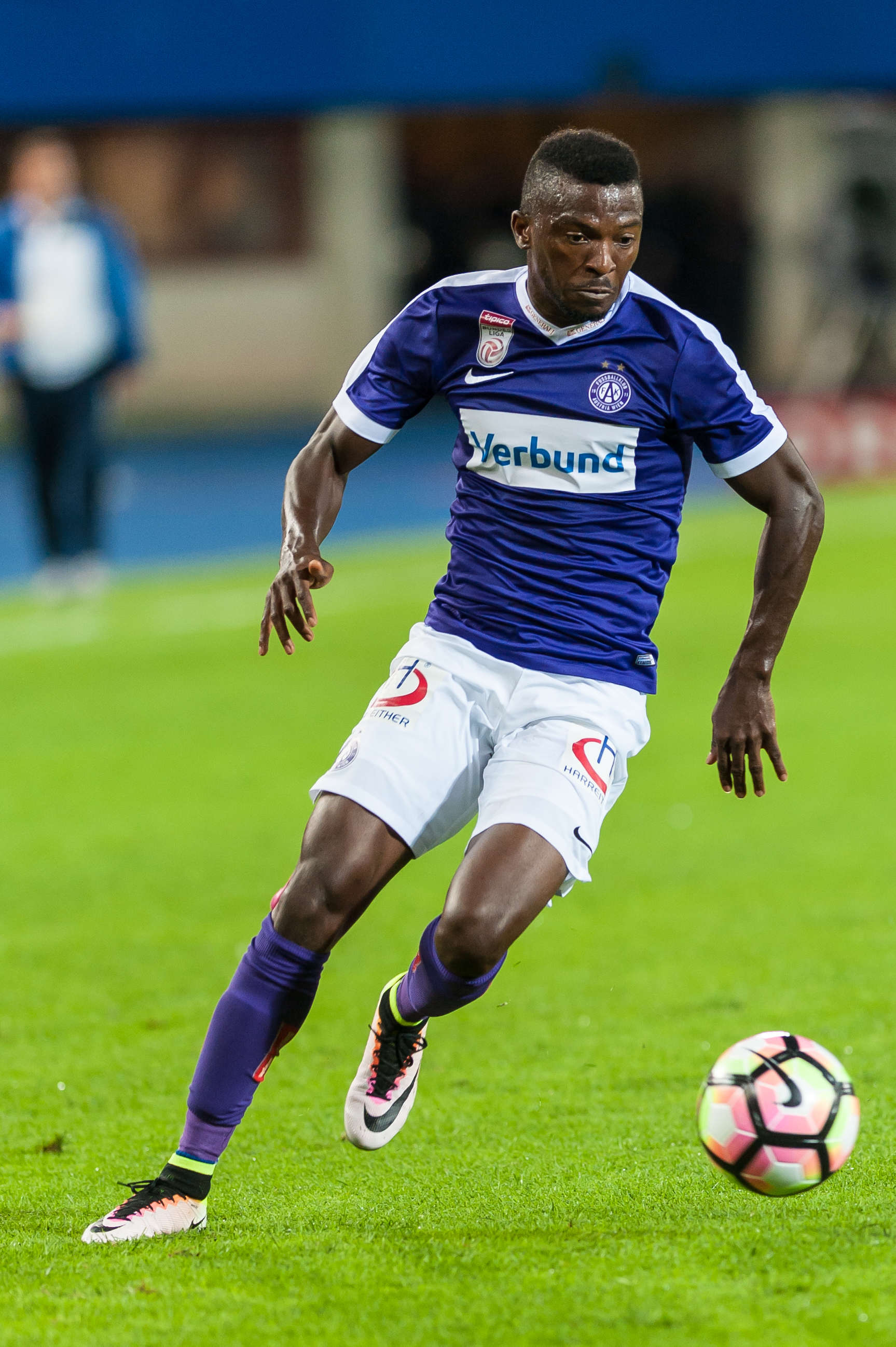
- Kayode in 2016

Personal information
- Full name: Olarenwaju Ayobami Kayode
- Date of birth: 8 May 1993 (age 33)
- Place of birth: Ibadan, Nigeria
- Height: 1.74 m (5 ft 9 in)
- Position: Forward

Team information
- Current team: Mardin 1969
- Number: 9

Senior career*
Years	Team	Apps	(Gls)
2010–2013	ASEC Mimosas	11	(5)
2012	→ Luzern (loan)	1	(0)
2012	→ Luzern II (loan)	11	(4)
2013	→ Heartland (loan)	0	(0)
2013–2014	→ Maccabi Netanya (loan)	25	(10)
2014–2015	Maccabi Netanya	31	(13)
2015–2017	Austria Wien	67	(30)
2017–2018	Manchester City	0	(0)
2017–2018	→ Girona (loan)	12	(0)
2018	→ Shakhtar Donetsk (loan)	6	(2)
2018–2023	Shakhtar Donetsk	10	(1)
2019–2020	→ Gaziantep (loan)	27	(10)
2020–2022	→ Sivasspor (loan)	66	(13)
2023	→ Ümraniyespor (loan)	11	(3)
2023–2024	Gençlerbirliği	19	(4)
2024–2025	Şanlıurfaspor	15	(7)
2025–2026	Esenler Erokspor	55	(24)
2026–	Mardin 1969	11	(3)

International career^{‡}
2009	Nigeria U17	5	(0)
2011–2013	Nigeria U20	15	(4)
2011	Nigeria U23	3	(0)
2017	Nigeria	4	(0)
- * Club domestic league appearances and goals as of 19 October 2026 ‡ National team caps and goals as of 21:00, 26 May 2022 (UTC)

Olarenwaju Ayobami Kayode (born 8 May 1993) is a Nigerian professional footballer who plays as a forward for Turkish TFF 1. Lig club Mardin 1969.

== Club career ==
=== Early career ===
Kayode began his career with Red Bull Ghana and signed in February 2010 for ASEC Mimosas.

On 2 February 2012 Kayode left ASEC Mimosas joining Swiss club FC Luzern on loan until 30 November 2012.

=== Maccabi Netanya ===
On 10 October 2013, Kayode signed a one-year contract with Israeli club Maccabi Netanya.

=== Austria Wien ===
After another successful season with Maccabi Netanya, netting 13 goals and six assists, Kayode signed a four-year deal with FK Austria Wien. On 2 August 2015, he scored on his FK Austria Wien debut against SC Rheindorf Altach.

=== Manchester City ===
On 17 August 2017, Manchester City signed Kayode on a four-year deal and immediately loaned him out to Girona for the 2017–18 season. Kayode made his La Liga debut on 19 August 2017, replacing Portu in a 2–2 home draw against Atlético Madrid.

On 2 March 2018, Kayode was loaned to Ukrainian Premier League club Shakhtar Donetsk after his loan at Girona was terminated.

=== Shakhtar Donetsk ===
On 8 June 2018, Shakhtar Donetsk announced that following Kayode's successful loan spell they would exercise their option to sign him permanently for an undisclosed fee. Kayode signed for Shakhtar on a five-year deal.

=== Gaziantep (loan) ===
On 9 August 2019, Kayode was loaned to Turkish Süper Lig side Gaziantep F.K.

=== Sivasspor (loan) ===
On 17 September 2020, Kayode signed on loan to Turkish Süper Lig side Sivasspor. He scored his first Sivasspor goal on his Europa League debut for the club against Villarreal in a 5–3 away loss, and scored against Maccabi Tel Aviv in a 2–1 home loss in the following fixture.

=== Ümraniyespor (loan) ===
Upon his return from Sivasspor, Kayode did not appear for Shakhtar in the first half of the 2022–23 season. On 30 January 2023, Kayode was loaned by Ümraniyespor until the end of the 2022–23 season.

== International career ==
Kayode played for the Nigeria U17 national team at the 2009 FIFA U-17 World Cup. On 3 May 2010, he earned his first call-up for the Nigeria U20 team for the qualifiers to the African Youth Championship in Libya. He was called on 12 April 2011 for the 2011 African Youth Championship in South Africa. Kayode made his debut for the senior team in a 1–1 draw with Senegal on 23 March 2017.

== Career statistics ==
=== Club ===
As of match played 26 May 2022

Appearances and goals by club, season and competition
Club	Season	League			National cup (Note: Includes Israel State Cup, Copa del Rey, Ukrainian Cup, Turkish Cup)		League cup (Note: Includes Toto Cup)		Europe		Total	
Club	Season	Division	Apps	Goals	Apps	Goals	Apps	Goals	Apps	Goals	Apps	Goals
Luzern (loan)	2011–12	Swiss Super League	1	0	0	0	—		0	0	1	0
Maccabi Netanya	2013–14	Liga Leumit	25	10	4	1	0	0	0	0	29	11
Maccabi Netanya	2014–15	Israeli Premier League	31	13	1	0	2	0	0	0	34	13
Maccabi Netanya	Total		56	23	5	1	2	0	0	0	64	24
Austria Wien	2015–16	Austrian Bundesliga	34	13	3	0	—		0	0	37	13
Austria Wien	2016–17	Austrian Bundesliga	33	17	3	2	—		12 (Note: Appearances in UEFA Europa League)	5	48	24
Austria Wien	Total		67	30	6	2	—		12	5	85	37
Manchester City	2017–18	Premier League	0	0	0	0	0	0	0	0	0	0
Girona (loan)	2017–18	La Liga	12	0	1	0	—		—		13	0
Shakhtar Donetsk (loan)	2017–18	Ukrainian Premier League	6	2	2	1	—		0	0	8	3
Shakhtar Donetsk	2018–19	Ukrainian Premier League	10	1	2	0	—		4 (Note: Three appearances in UEFA Champions League, one appearances in UEFA Europa League)	0	16	1
Gaziantep (loan)	2019–20	Süper Lig	27	10	2	0	–		–		29	10
Sivasspor (loan)	2020–21	Süper Lig	33	6	2	1	–		5	4	40	11
Sivasspor (loan)	2021–22	Süper Lig	33	6	5	0	–		6 (Note: Appearances in UEFA Europa Conference League)	2	44	8
Sivasspor (loan)	Total		66	12	7	1	—		11	6	84	19
Career total			244	78	25	5	4	0	29	11	299	94

=== International ===
As of 2 June 2019

Appearances and goals by national team and year
National team	Year	Apps	Goals
Nigeria	2017	4	0
Nigeria	2018	0	0
Total		4	0

== Honours ==
ASEC Mimosas

- Ligue 1: 2010

Maccabi Netanya

- Liga Leumit: 2013–14

Shakhtar Donetsk

- Ukrainian Premier League: 2017–18, 2018–19
- Ukrainian Cup: 2017–18, 2018–19

Sivasspor

- Turkish Cup: 2021–22
