= Lukas Rotpuller =

Austrian footballer

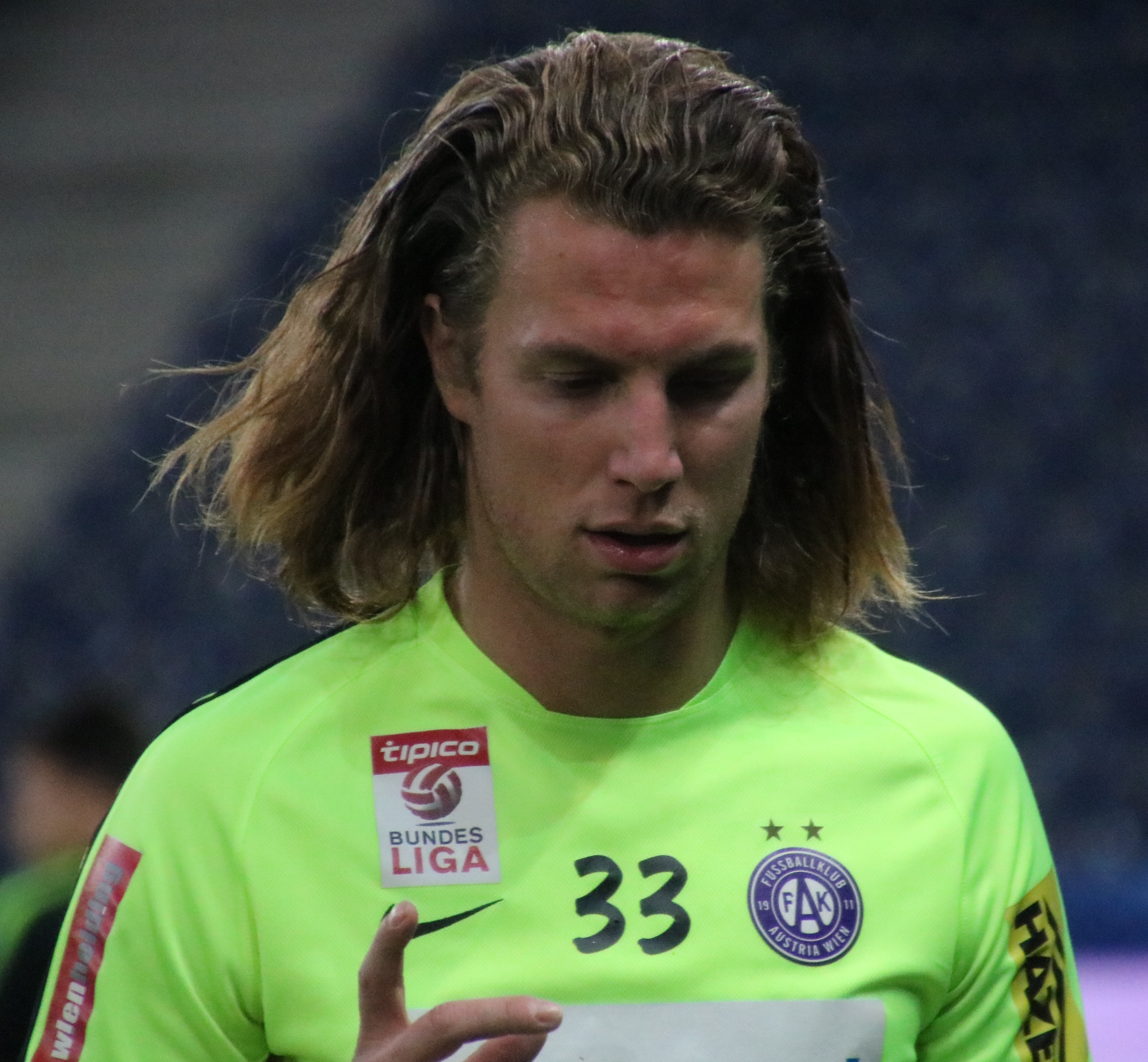
- Rotpuller with Austria Wien in 2016

Personal information
- Full name: Lukas Rotpuller
- Date of birth: 31 March 1991 (age 35)
- Place of birth: Eisenstadt, Austria
- Height: 1.88 m (6 ft 2 in)
- Position: Defender

Youth career
- 1998–2000: ASK Baumgarten
- 2000–2001: SV Schattendorf
- 2001–2004: ASK Baumgarten
- 2004–2005: BNZ Burgenland
- 2005–2011: Austria Wien

Senior career*
Years	Team	Apps	(Gls)
2011–2017	Austria Wien	115	(5)
2011–2012	→ SV Ried (loan)	18	(0)
2018	Valladolid	0	(0)
- * Club domestic league appearances and goals as of 25 February 2018

Lukas Rotpuller (born 31 March 1991) is an Austrian footballer of Croatian descent who plays as a defender.

== Career ==
On 22 February 2018, Rotpuller signed for Real Valladolid for the remainder of the 2017–18 season.
