= Fabian Koch =

Austrian footballer

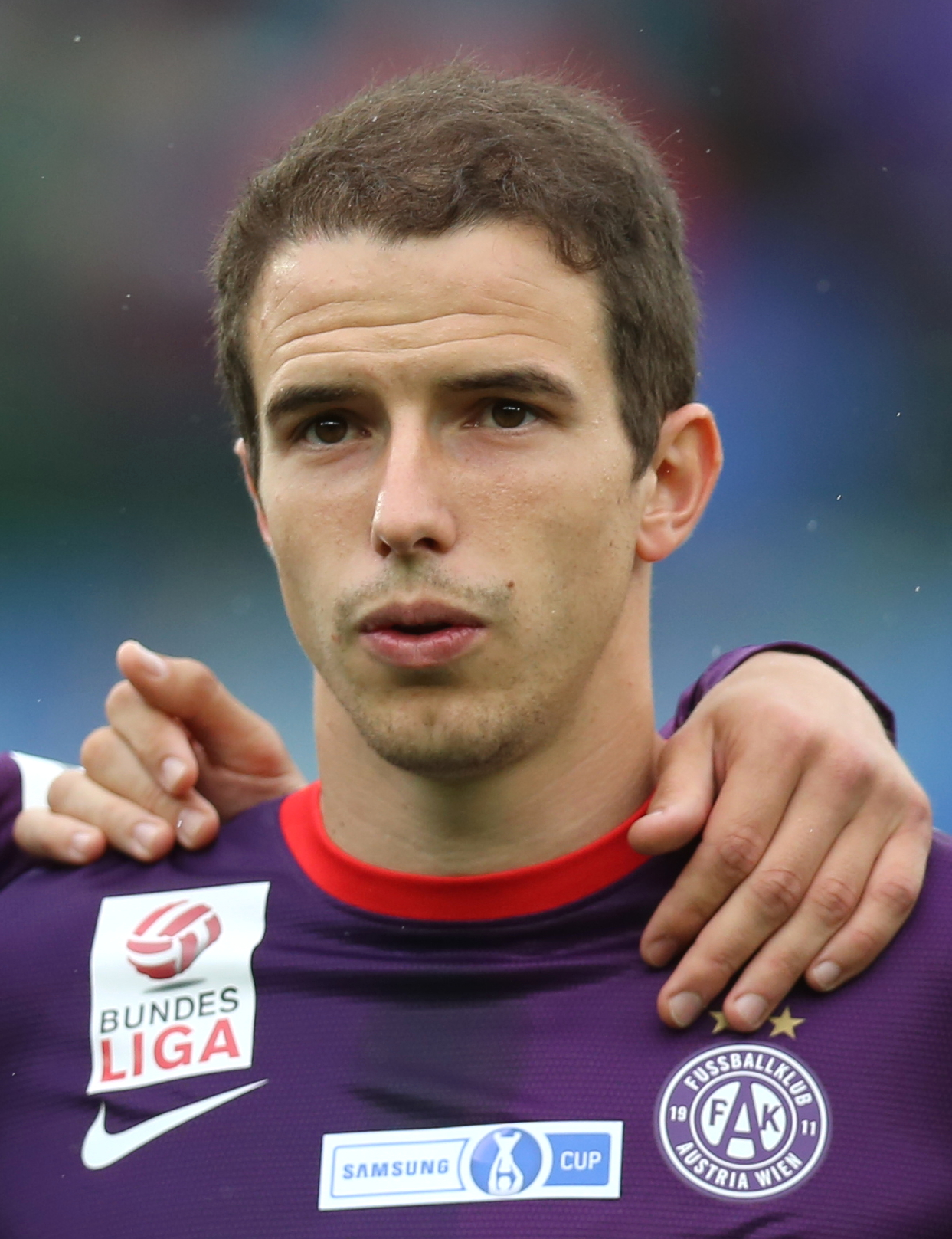

Personal information
- Date of birth: June 24, 1989 (age 37)
- Place of birth: Rum, Austria
- Height: 1.80 m (5 ft 11 in)
- Position: Right-back

Team information
- Current team: FC Natters

Youth career
- 1995–2007: SV Natters
- 2007–2008: BNZ Tirol

Senior career*
Years	Team	Apps	(Gls)
2008–2010	Wacker Innsbruck	61	(2)
2011–2016	Austria Wien	95	(4)
2016–2019	Sturm Graz	106	(6)
2020–2022	WSG Tirol	70	(3)
2022–	FC Natters		
- * Club domestic league appearances and goals as of 20:13, 24 July 2022 (UTC)

Fabian Koch (born 24 June 1989) is an Austrian professional footballer who plays as a right-back for Tiroler Liga club FC Natters.

On 9 May 2018 he played as Sturm Graz best Red Bull Salzburg in extra time to win the 2017/18 Austrian Cup.

== Honours ==
Sturm Graz

- Austrian Cup: 2017–18
