= Dominik Prokop =

Austrian footballer (born 1997)

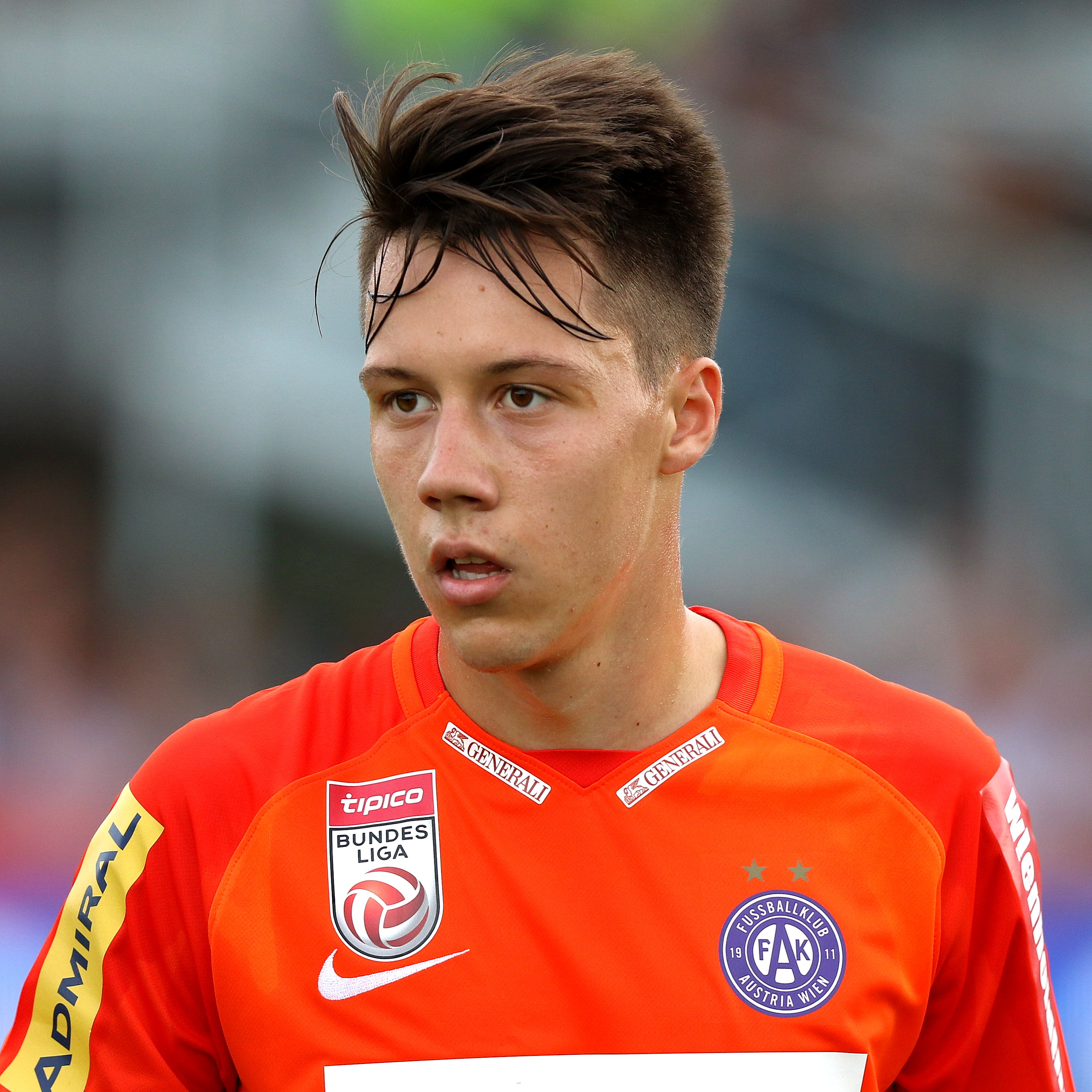
- Prokop with Austria Wien 2017

Personal information
- Date of birth: 2 June 1997 (age 29)
- Place of birth: Vienna, Austria
- Height: 1.72 m (5 ft 8 in)
- Position: Attacking midfielder

Team information
- Current team: Olympiakos Nicosia
- Number: 10

Youth career
- 2004–2005: Team Wiener Linien
- 2005–2015: Austria Wien

Senior career*
Years	Team	Apps	(Gls)
2013–2020	Austria Wien II	78	(14)
2016–2020	Austria Wien	86	(7)
2020–2022	SV Wehen Wiesbaden	32	(3)
2022–2023	Gorica	6	(0)
2023	→ TSV Hartberg (loan)	11	(4)
2023–2026	TSV Hartberg	75	(8)
2026	Željezničar	13	(2)
2026-	Olympiakos Nicosia		

International career
2012–2013	Austria U16	13	(6)
2013–2014	Austria U17	8	(2)
2014	Austria U18	4	(2)
2015–2016	Austria U19	12	(5)
2015	Austria U20	1	(0)
2017–2018	Austria U21	15	(1)
- * Club domestic league appearances and goals as of 25 May 2026

Dominik Prokop (born 2 June 1997) is an Austrian professional footballer who plays as an attacking midfielder.

== Club career ==
=== Early career ===
Born in Vienna, Prokop started his football career at hometown club Austria Wien. He played in ÖFB-Nachwuchs and scored 15 goals in 38 games.

=== Austria Wien ===
On 1 January 2016, Prokop has signed his first professional contract with Austria Wien for 2.5-years. He made his league debut on 10 April 2016 against SV Grödig at Franz Horr Stadium, replacing Raphael Holzhauser in a game Austria Wien lost by 2–0. On 14 July 2016, Prokop played in the UEFA Europa League against Kukësi as a starter for the first time. He scored his first goal for Austria Wien on 20 October 2016 at matchday three of the 2016–17 UEFA Europa League group stage against Roma in the 82nd minute.

== International career ==
Prokop has played for Austria at all under-age levels. He participated at the 2014 UEFA European Under-17 Championship and the 2015 UEFA European Under-19 Championship, and made 15 appearances for the Austrian under-21 team.

== Personal life ==
Prokop's younger brother, Lukas, is also a professional footballer.

== Career statistics ==
As of match played 25 May 2026

Appearances and goals by club, season and competition
Club	Season	League			Cup		Europe		Total	
Club	Season	Division	Apps	Goals	Apps	Goals	Apps	Goals	Apps	Goals
Austria Wien II	2012–13	Austrian Regionalliga Ost	5	0	—		—		5	0
Austria Wien II	2013–14	Austrian Regionalliga Ost	21	6	—		—		21	6
Austria Wien II	2014–15	Austrian Regionalliga Ost	27	3	—		—		27	3
Austria Wien II	2015–16	Austrian Regionalliga Ost	21	3	—		—		21	3
Austria Wien II	2016–17	Austrian Regionalliga Ost	1	0	—		—		1	0
Austria Wien II	2019–20	Austrian Second League	3	2	—		—		3	2
Austria Wien II	Total		78	14	—		—		78	14
Austria Wien	2015–16	Austrian Bundesliga	1	0	1	0	—		2	0
Austria Wien	2016–17	Austrian Bundesliga	13	1	1	0	4 (Note: Appearance(s) in UEFA Europa League)	1	18	2
Austria Wien	2017–18	Austrian Bundesliga	30	5	3	1	9	2	42	8
Austria Wien	2018–19	Austrian Bundesliga	27	1	4	2	—		31	3
Austria Wien	2019–20	Austrian Bundesliga	15	0	1	2	1	0	17	2
Austria Wien	Total		86	7	10	5	14	3	110	15
Wehen Wiesbaden	2020–21	3. Liga	7	2	1	0	—		8	2
Wehen Wiesbaden	2021–22	3. Liga	25	1	1	0	—		26	1
Wehen Wiesbaden	Total		32	3	2	0	—		34	3
Gorica	2022–23	Croatian Football League	6	0	1	0	—		7	0
TSV Hartberg (loan)	2022–23	Austrian Bundesliga	11	4	0	0	—		11	4
TSV Hartberg	2023–24	Austrian Bundesliga	32	4	2	0	—		34	4
TSV Hartberg	2024–25	Austrian Bundesliga	29	3	5	1	—		34	4
TSV Hartberg	2025–26	Austrian Bundesliga	14	1	3	1	—		17	2
TSV Hartberg	Total		86	12	10	2	—		96	14
Željezničar	2025–26	Bosnian Premier League	13	2	2	1	—		15	3
Career total			301	38	25	8	14	3	340	49
