= Tarkan Serbest =

Turkish footballer (born 1994)

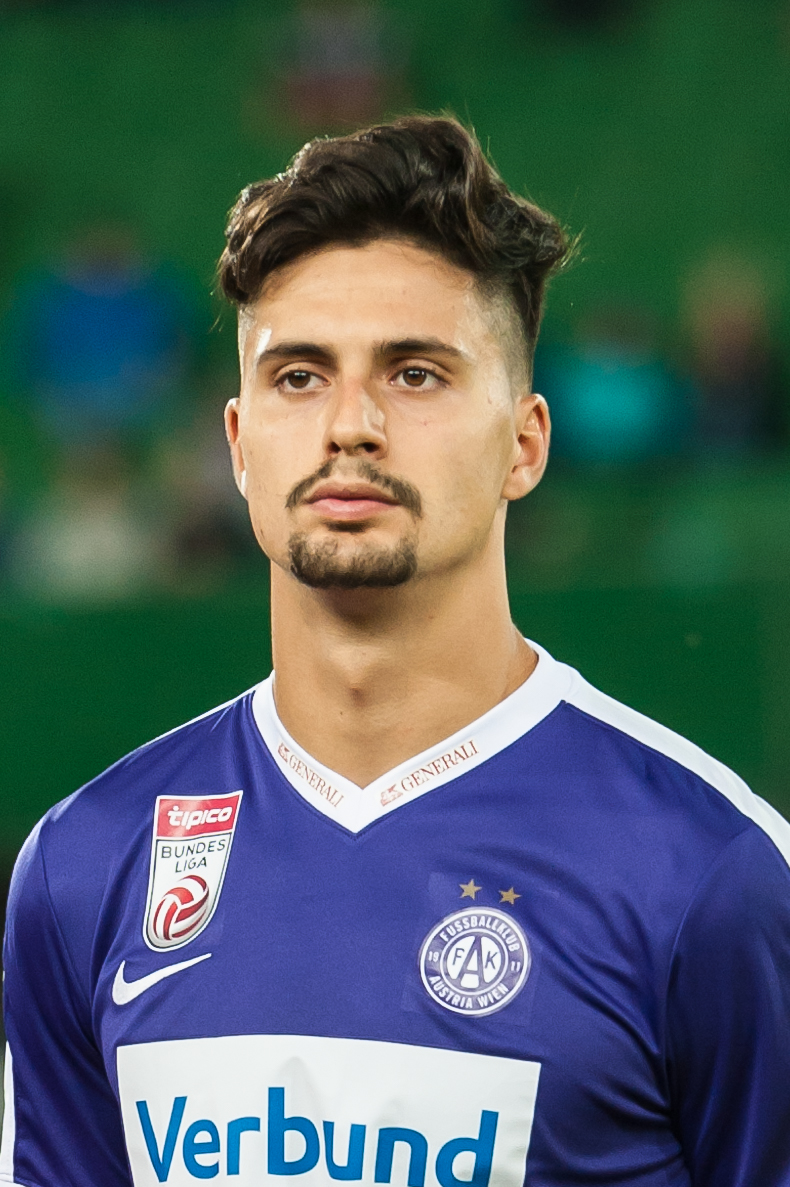
- Serbest with Austria Wien in 2016

Personal information
- Date of birth: 2 May 1994 (age 32)
- Place of birth: Vienna, Austria
- Height: 1.84 m (6 ft 0 in)
- Position: Midfielder

Team information
- Current team: Kütahyaspor
- Number: 15

Youth career
- 2001–2004: SV Donau
- 2004–2014: FK Austria Wien

Senior career*
Years	Team	Apps	(Gls)
2011–2014	FK Austria Wien II	81	(2)
2014–2019	Austria Wien	103	(2)
2018–2019	→ Kasımpaşa (loan)	33	(2)
2020–2023	Kasımpaşa	74	(1)
2023–2024	Göztepe	22	(0)
2024–2026	Kocaelispor	39	(0)
2026	Amedspor	17	(1)
2026–	Kütahyaspor	5	(0)

International career
2015–2016	Austria U21	9	(2)
2018–	Turkey	1	(0)
- * Club domestic league appearances and goals as of 18 October 2026

Tarkan Serbest (born 2 May 1994) is a professional footballer who plays as a midfielder for TFF Second Lig club Kütahyaspor. Born in Austria, he represented it internationally as a junior before switching allegiance to Turkey for senior level.

== International career ==
Serbest was born in Austria and is of Turkish descent. A former youth international for Austria, he switched to represent the Turkey national football team and made his debut in a 2-1 friendly win over Iran on 28 May 2018.
