= Christoph Martschinko =

Austrian footballer

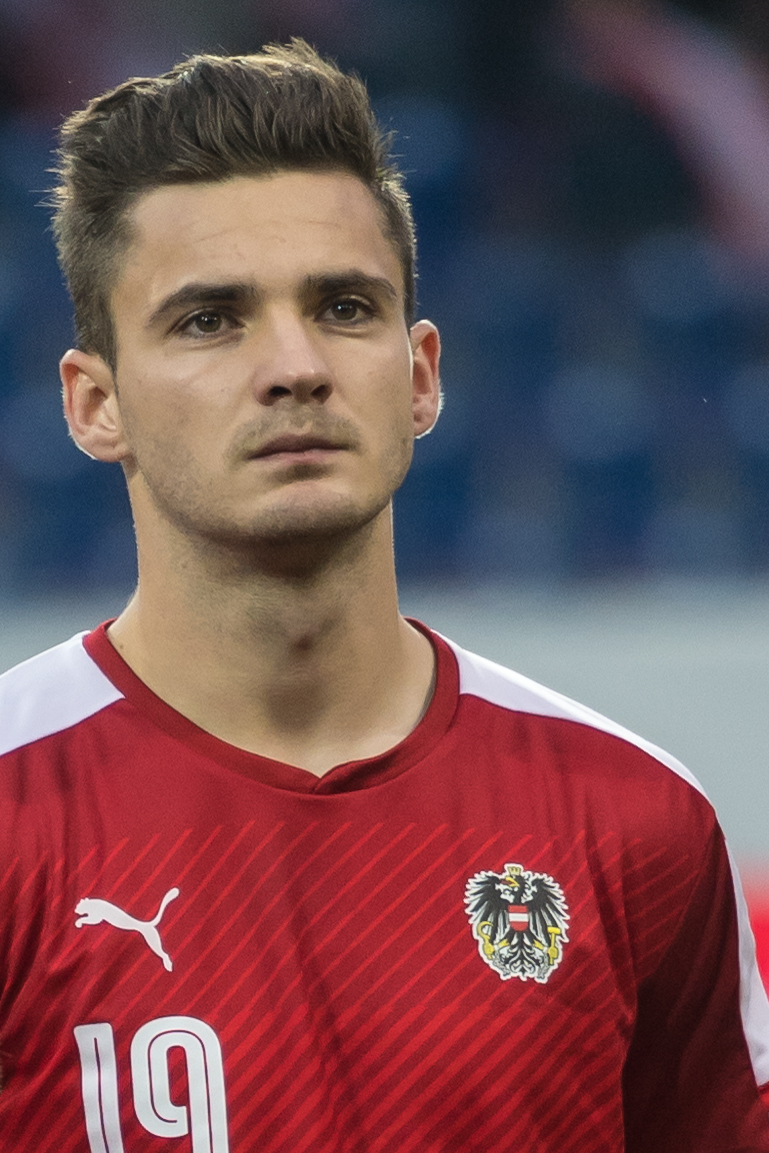
- Martschinko with Austria U21 in 2016

Personal information
- Date of birth: 13 February 1994 (age 32)
- Place of birth: Lebring, Austria
- Height: 1.73 m (5 ft 8 in)
- Position: Defender

Youth career
- 2000–2008: SV Lebring
- 2008–2010: Red Bull Salzburg

Senior career*
Years	Team	Apps	(Gls)
2010–2012	Red Bull Salzburg Juniors	33	(1)
2012–2015	Red Bull Salzburg	0	(0)
2012–2014	→ Wiener Neustadt (loan)	44	(2)
2014–2015	→ Grödig (loan)	46	(1)
2015–2016	1899 Hoffenheim	0	(0)
2015–2016	→ Austria Wien (loan)	33	(0)
2016–2020	Austria Wien	55	(1)
2020–2022	Austria Wien II	23	(2)
2022	Riga FC	8	(0)

International career^{‡}
2009–2010	Austria U16	8	(5)
2010–2011	Austria U17	9	(0)
2011	Austria U18	2	(0)
2012–2013	Austria U19	7	(2)
2013	Austria U21	23	(0)
- * Club domestic league appearances and goals as of 10 September 2021 ‡ National team caps and goals as of 4 July 2022

Christoph Martschinko (born 13 February 1994 in Lebring, Styria) is an Austrian former professional footballer who played as a defender for FK Austria Wien. His parents were Ukrainian immigrants.

== Career ==
Martschinko started playing in the youth team of his local club SV Lebring and was transferred to the youth team of FC Red Bull Salzburg in 2008. In 2011, he made his first cap for the Red Bull Juniors, the second team of the club. In April 2012 he gained his first contract as professional player. 2012 he went out on loan to SC Wiener Neustadt where he had his debut in the first league on 15 September 2012 versus Wolfsberger AC.

After making appearances in 116 competitive Austrian club football matches, Martschinko retired in July 2022.

Since 2009 he also played for various national teams (U16-U19).

== Career statistics ==
=== Club ===
As of 8 December 2020

Appearances and goals by club, season and competition
Club	Season	League			Cup		Continental		Other		Total	
Club	Season	Division	Apps	Goals	Apps	Goals	Apps	Goals	Apps	Goals	Apps	Goals
Wiener Neustadt (loan)	2012–13	Austrian Bundesliga	26	0	1	0	—		—		27	0
Wiener Neustadt (loan)	2013–14	Austrian Bundesliga	18	2	2	0	—		—		20	2
Wiener Neustadt (loan)	Total		44	2	3	0	—		—		47	2
Grödig (loan)	2013–14	Austrian Bundesliga	12	0	—		—		—		12	0
Grödig (loan)	2014–15	Austrian Bundesliga	34	1	4	0	2	0	—		40	1
Grödig (loan)	Total		46	1	4	0	2	0	—		52	1
Austria Wien (loan)	2015–16	Austrian Bundesliga	33	0	2	0	—		—		35	0
Austria Wien	2016–17	Austrian Bundesliga	23	1	2	0	11	1	—		36	2
Austria Wien	2017–18	Austrian Bundesliga	8	0	1	0	6	0	—		15	0
Austria Wien	2018–19	Austrian Bundesliga	10	0	—		—		—		10	0
Austria Wien	2019–20	Austrian Bundesliga	13	0	2	0	2	0	—		17	0
Austria Wien	2020–21	Austrian Bundesliga	1	0	2	0	—		—		3	0
Austria Wien	Total		55	1	7	0	19	1	0	0	81	2
Career total			178	4	16	0	21	1	0	0	215	5
