= List of Austrian football transfers summer 2018 =

This is a list of Austrian football transfers for the 2018 summer transfer window. Only transfers featuring Austrian Football Bundesliga are listed.

== Austrian Football Bundesliga ==
Note: Flags indicate national team as has been defined under FIFA eligibility rules. Players may hold more than one non-FIFA nationality.

=== Admira Wacker Mödling ===
In:

No.	Pos.	Nation	Player
--	MF	DEN	Morten Hjulmand (from (Denmark) København U19)
--	DF	AUT	Sebastian Bauer (from Ebreichsdorf)

Out:

No.	Pos.	Nation	Player
5	MF	AUT	Thomas Ebner (to Austria Wien)
6	MF	AUT	Markus Lackner (to Sturm Graz)
7	MF	AUT	Maximilian Sax (to Austria Wien)
13	DF	ESP	Ione Cabrera (to Wattens)

=== Austria Wien ===
In:

No.	Pos.	Nation	Player
--	MF	AUT	Maximilian Sax (from Admira Wacker)
--	MF	SRB	Uroš Matić (on loan from (Denmark) København)
--	MF	AUS	James Jeggo (from Sturm Graz)
--	DF	AUT	Christian Schoissengeyr (from Sturm Graz)
--	FW	ISR	Alon Turgeman (from (Israel) Hapoel Haifa)
--	MF	AUT	Thomas Ebner (from Admira Wacker)

Out:

No.	Pos.	Nation	Player
26	MF	AUT	Raphael Holzhauser (to (Switzerland) Grasshoppers)

=== LASK Linz ===
In:

No.	Pos.	Nation	Player
--	FW	NGA	Yusuf Otubanjo (from (Slovakia) Žilina, previously on loan at SCR Altach)
--	MF	AUT	Florian Jamnig (from Wacker Innsbruck)
--	MF	GER	Fabian Benko (from (Germany) Bayern Munich)

Out:

No.	Pos.	Nation	Player
7	FW	AUT	René Gartler (to St. Pölten)

=== Rapid Wien ===
In:

No.	Pos.	Nation	Player
--	FW	SRB	Andrija Pavlović (from (Denmark) København)
--	DF	AUT	Marvin Potzmann (from Sturm Graz)
--	MF	AUT	Manuel Martic (from St. Pölten)

Out:

No.	Pos.	Nation	Player
10	MF	AUT	Louis Schaub (to (Germany) 1. FC Köln)
22	DF	AUT	Mario Pavelić (to (Croatia) Rijeka)
27	MF	AUT	Andreas Kuen (to Mattersburg)

=== Red Bull Salzburg ===
In:

No.	Pos.	Nation	Player
--	MF	MLI	Mohamed Camara (from (Mali) Real Bamako)
--	MF	AUT	Zlatko Junuzović (from (Germany) Werder Bremen)
--	FW	GER	Kilian Ludewig (from (Germany) Leipzig U19)

Out:

No.	Pos.	Nation	Player
30	GK	POL	Bartłomiej Żynel (to (Poland) Wisła Płock)

=== Rheindorf Altach ===
In:

No.	Pos.	Nation	Player
--	MF	AUT	Manfred Fischer (from TSV Hartberg)

Out:

No.	Pos.	Nation	Player
10	MF	AUT	Patrick Salomon (to Mattersburg)
14	FW	NGA	Yusuf Otubanjo (loan return to (Slovakia) Žilina)
26	MF	AUT	Daniel Nussbaumer (to (Germany) Stuttgart II)
33	FW	TUR	Volkan Akyildiz (on loan to Austria Klagenfurt)

=== St. Pölten ===
In:

No.	Pos.	Nation	Player
--	FW	AUT	René Gartler (from LASK Linz)
--	DF	AUT	Patrick Puchegger (from Sturm Graz)
--	DF	AUT	Daniel Drescher (from Wolfsberger AC)

Out:

No.	Pos.	Nation	Player
17	MF	AUT	Manuel Martic (to Rapid Wien)
29	DF	AUT	David Stec (to (Poland) Pogoń Szczecin)

=== Sturm Graz ===
In:

No.	Pos.	Nation	Player
--	MF	AUT	Markus Lackner (from Admira Wacker)
--	DF	GRE	Tasos Avlonitis (from (Greece) Panathinaikos)

Out:

No.	Pos.	Nation	Player
5	DF	AUT	Christian Schoissengeyr (to Austria Wien)
6	MF	AUS	James Jeggo (to Austria Wien)
19	DF	AUT	Marvin Potzmann (to Rapid Wien)
22	DF	AUT	Patrick Puchegger (to St. Pölten)
24	MF	AUT	Marc Andre Schmerböck (to Wolfsberger AC)
29	MF	AUT	Thorsten Röcher (to (Germany) Ingolstadt 04)

=== SV Mattersburg ===
In:

No.	Pos.	Nation	Player
--	FW	AUT	Marko Kvasina (from (Netherlands) Twente)
--	MF	AUT	Daniel Kerschbaumer (from Blau-Weiß Linz)
--	MF	AUT	Andreas Kuen (from Rapid Wien)
--	MF	AUT	Patrick Salomon (from SCR Altach)
--	FW	ESP	Jefté Betancor (from ATSV Stadl-Paura)

Out:

No.	Pos.	Nation	Player
25	DF	AUT	Michael Novak (to Wolfsberger AC)

=== TSV Hartberg ===
In:

No.	Pos.	Nation	Player
--	DF	AUT	Tobias Kainz (from Kapfenberger SV)

Out:

No.	Pos.	Nation	Player
3	DF	AUT	Stefan Meusburger (to Wacker Innsbruck)
6	DF	AUT	Manfred Gollner (to Wolfsberger AC)
19	MF	AUT	Sven Sprangler (to Wolfsberger AC)
20	MF	AUT	Manfred Fischer (to SCR Altach)
39	DF	AUT	Stefan Gölles (to Wolfsberger AC)

=== Wacker Innsbruck ===
In:

No.	Pos.	Nation	Player
--	FW	JPN	Atsushi Zaizen (from (Japan) Kyoto Sanga)
--	DF	AUT	Florian Buchacher (from Wattens)
--	DF	AUT	Stefan Meusburger (from Hartberg)
--	DF	AUT	Stefan Perić (from (Germany) Stuttgart II)

Out:

No.	Pos.	Nation	Player
7	MF	AUT	Florian Jamnig (to LASK Linz)

=== Wolfsberger AC ===
In:

No.	Pos.	Nation	Player
--	MF	AUT	Marc Andre Schmerböck (from Sturm Graz)
--	DF	AUT	Michael Novak (from Mattersburg)
--	DF	AUT	Stefan Gölles (from Hartberg)
--	DF	AUT	Manfred Gollner (from Hartberg)
--	MF	AUT	Sven Sprangler (from Hartberg)

Out:

No.	Pos.	Nation	Player
27	DF	AUT	Daniel Drescher (to St. Pölten)

== See also ==
- 2018–19 Austrian Football Bundesliga
