= 2015–16 FC Admira Wacker Mödling season =

Admira Wacker is an Austrian football club which is based in Maria Enzersdorf. During the 2015–16 campaign they will be competing in the following competitions: Austrian Bundesliga, Austrian Cup.

== Pre Season ==
| 22 June 2015 | Admira (Austria) | 0–0 | (Romania) Târgu Mureș |
| 17:30 | | Summary |

| 25 June 2015 | Admira (Austria) | 1–1 | (Romania) Concordia Chiajna |
| 17:00 | | Summary |

| 30 June 2015 | Admira (Austria) | 2–2 | (Hungary) Diósgyőr |
| 17:00 | | Summary |

| 3 July 2015 | Hartberg (Austria) | 0–0 | (Austria) Admira |
| 17:30 | | Summary |

| 7 July 2015 | Admira (Austria) | 3–1 | (Russia) FC Terek Grozny |
| 17:00 | | Summary |

| 10 July 2015 | Admira (Austria) | 0–0 | (Czech Republic) Zbrojovka Brno |
| 18:00 | | Summary |

| 21 July 2015 | Admira (Austria) | 2–0 | (Israel) Hapoel Ra'anana |
| 17:30 | Knasmüllner 57'; Toth 84' (pen.) | Summary |

== Competitions ==
=== Austrian Bundesliga ===
| 25 July 2015 Match 1 | Sturm Graz | 1–1 | Admira | Graz |
| 18:30 CET | Offenbacher (yellow card) 5'; Piesinger (yellow card) 37'; Dobras (yellow card) 40'; Tadić 56' | Summary | Starkl 45' (yellow card) 58' (yellow-red card); Markus Lackner (yellow card) 51'; Wessely (yellow card) 80' | Stadium: UPC-Arena; Attendance: 8,745; Referee: (Austria) Dominik Ouschan |

| 1 August 2015 Match 2 | Admira | 2–1 | SV Mattersburg | Maria Enzersdorf |
| 18:30 CET | Knasmüllner 31'; Vastić 69'; Ebner (yellow card) 71'; Markus Blutsch (yellow card) 87'; Grozurek (yellow card) 90+3' | Summary | Manuel Prietl (yellow card) 52'; Pink 88' | Stadium: Bundesstadion Südstadt; Attendance: 2,468; Referee: (Austria) Oliver Drachta |

| 8 August 2015 Match 3 | Admira | 2–2 | Red Bull Salzburg | Maria Enzersdorf |
| 18:30 CET | Starkl 17' (yellow card) 60'; Lackner 32'; Ebner (yellow card) 74'; Wessely (yellow card) 90+4' | Summary | Reyna 7'; Keïta 34' | Stadium: Bundesstadion Südstadt; Attendance: 2,900; Referee: (Austria) Andreas Heiß |

| 12 August 2015 Match 4 | SV Grödig | 2–3 | Admira | Grödig |
| 20:30 CET | Wallner 38'; Pichler 47' | Summary | Ebner (yellow card) 40'; Bajrami 44'; Rasner 58' (o.g.); Schößwendter (yellow card) 59'; Vastić 84' | Stadium: Untersberg-Arena; Attendance: 1,212; Referee: (Austria) Dieter Muckenhammer |

| 15 August 2015 Match 5 | Admira | 3–1 | SV Ried | Maria Enzersdorf |
| 18:30 CET | Starkl 7' 27'; Toth (yellow card) 23'; Schößwendter 47'; Ebner (yellow card) 86' | Summary | Janeczek (yellow card) 5'; Schubert 71' (yellow card) 90'; Filipović (yellow card) 73' | Stadium: Bundesstadion Südstadt; Attendance: 2,402; Referee: (Austria) René Eisner |

| 23 August 2015 Match 6 | Rheindorf Altach | 1–2 | Admira | Altach |
| 18:00 CET | Ngwat-Mahop (yellow card) 23' (goal) 90+3'; Aigner (yellow card) 86' | Summary | Schößwendter 39'; Grozurek (yellow card) 45+3'; Wostry (yellow card) 58' (yellow-red card) 73'; Blutsch 69'; Bajrami (yellow card) 77'; Toth (yellow card) 89' | Stadium: Cashpoint Arena; Attendance: 4,217; Referee: (Austria) Manuel Schüttengruber |

| 23 August 2015 Match 7 | Admira | 0–1 | Austria Wien | Maria Enzersdorf |
| 15:00 CET | Sax (yellow card) 20'; Bajrami (yellow card) 43'; Ebner (yellow card) 55'; Neuhold (yellow card) 60'; Schicker (yellow card) 90+4' | Summary | Sikov (yellow card) 37'; Martschinko (yellow card) 44'; Gorgon 61' | Stadium: Bundesstadion Südstadt; Attendance: 4,986; Referee: (Austria) Christopher Jäger |

| 12 September 2015 Match 8 | Admira | 1–0 | Wolfsberger AC | Maria Enzersdorf |
| 17:30 CET | Schößwendter 14' (yellow card) 37' (yellow-red card) 78' | Summary | Weber (yellow card) 24'; Ouedraogo (yellow card) 56' | Stadium: Bundesstadion Südstadt; Attendance: 2,020; Referee: (Austria) Julian Weinberger |

| 20 September 2015 Match 9 | SK Rapid Wien | 2–0 | Admira | Wien |
| 15:30 CET | Schwab (yellow card) 23' (goal) 42'; Hofmann (yellow card) 36'; Dibon 66' | Summary | Blutsch (yellow card) 41' | Stadium: Ernst-Happel-Stadion; Attendance: 15,500; Referee: (Austria) Robert Schörgenhofer |

| 27 September 2015 Match 10 | Admira | 0–1 | Sturm Graz | Maria Enzersdorf |
| 15:30 CET | Schicker (yellow card) 21'; Lackner (yellow card) 56' | Summary | Schick (yellow card) 50'; Kienast 54'; Avdijaj (yellow card) 61' | Stadium: Bundesstadion Südstadt; Attendance: 3,033; Referee: (Austria) Manuel Schuttengruber |

| 3 October 2015 Match 11 | SV Mattersburg | 0–4 | Admira | Mattersburg |
| 17:30 CET | Holler (yellow card) 66' | Summary | Zwierschitz 8'; Toth (yellow card) 73' (goal) 87'; Sax 77'; Starkl 81' | Stadium: Pappelstadion; Attendance: 3,800; Referee: (Austria) Andreas Kollegger |

| 17 October 2015 Match 12 | FC Red Bull Salzburg | 8–0 | Admira | Wals-Siezenheim |
| 15:00 CET | Soriano 31', 53'; Ćaleta-Car (yellow card) 44'; Berisha 44', 70'; Keïta 56'; Minamino 64'; Damari 75'; Mukhtar 86' | Summary | Ebner (yellow card) 17'; Schicker (yellow card) 73' | Stadium: Red Bull Arena; Attendance: 7,715; Referee: (Austria) Dieter Muckenhammer |

| 24 October 2015 Match 13 | Admira | 0–0 | SV Grödig | Mattersburg |
| 17:30 CET | | Summary | Schütz (yellow card) 19'; Denner (yellow card) 55'; Wallner (yellow card) 90+4' | Stadium: Pappelstadion; Attendance: 7,715; Referee: (Austria) Dieter Muckenhammer |

| 31 October 2015 Match 14 | SV Ried | 1–1 | Admira | Ried im Innkreis |
| 18:30 CET | Filipović (yellow card) 44'; Polverino (yellow card) 50'; Trauner 58' | Summary | Toth (yellow card) 44'; Ebner (yellow card) 55'; Wostry (yellow card) 60'; Schicker 77' | Stadium: Keine Sorgen Arena; Attendance: 3,383; Referee: (Austria) Robert Schörgenhofer |

| 7 November 2015 Match 15 | Admira | 1–1 | Altach | Maria Enzersdorf |
| 18:30 CET | Toth (yellow card) 40'; Ebner (yellow card) 70'; Schößwendter 74' (pen.) | Summary | Daniel Luxbacher 27'; Hofbauer (yellow card) 45'; Jan Zwischenbrugger (yellow card) 65'; Lukas Jäger (yellow card) 73' | Stadium: Bundesstadion Südstadt; Attendance: 1,604; Referee: (Austria) Harald Lechner |

| 21 November 2015 Match 16 | Austria Wien | 1–1 | Admira | Vienna |
| 16:00 CET | Rotpuller (yellow card) 60'; Kayode 73' | Summary | Sax (yellow card) 19'; Wostry (yellow card) 22'; Spiridonović 90' (yellow card) 90' | Stadium: Franz Horr Stadium; Attendance: 6,985; Referee: (Austria) Dieter Muckenhammer |

| 28 November 2015 Match 17 | Wolfsberger AC | 4–0 | Admira | Wolfsberg, Carinthia |
| 18:30 CET | Silvio 7' 29'; Hüttenbrenner (yellow card) 20'; Ouédraogo (yellow card) 65'; Lackner 74' (o.g.); Standfest 90' | Summary | Philipp Malicsek (yellow card) 26' | Stadium: Lavanttal-Arena; Attendance: 2,752; Referee: (Austria) Julian Weinberger |

| 2 December 2015 Match 18 | Admira | 2–1 | Rapid Wien | Maria Enzersdorf |
| 18:30 CET | Zwierschitz 53'; Spiridonović 63' (pen.) | Summary | Hofmann (yellow card) 30'; Alar 38'; Kainz (yellow card) 56'; Petsos (yellow card) 82' | Stadium: Bundesstadion Südstadt; Attendance: 4,669; Referee: (Austria) Dominik Ouschan |

| 5 December 2015 Match 19 | Sturm Graz | 1–1 | Admira | Graz |
| 18:30 CET | Horvath 9'; Madl (yellow card) 55' (yellow-red card); Potzmann (yellow card) 68' (yellow-red card); Spendlhofer (yellow card) 74' | Summary | Schicker (yellow card) 55'; Knasmüllner (yellow card) 63'; Spiridonović (yellow card) 90'; Žulj 90+6' (yellow card) 90+7' | Stadium: UPC-Arena; Attendance: 5,129; Referee: (Austria) Oliver Drachta |

| 12 December 2015 Match 20 | Admira | 1–1 | SV Mattersburg | Maria Enzersdorf |
| 18:30 CET | Schößwendter 35' | Summary | Pink 42'; Novak (yellow card) 86' | Stadium: Bundesstadion Südstadt; Attendance: 1,708; Referee: (Austria) Dieter Muckenhammer |

=== Austrian Cup ===
| 18 July 2015 Round 1 | SV Schwechat | 1–1 (a.e.t.) (2–4 p) | Admira | Schwechat |
| 18:00 CET | Saliji (yellow card) 11'; Kracher 34' (yellow card) 90'; Topel (yellow card) 60'; Gangl (yellow card) 90+7' | Summary | Zwierschitz 26'; Wostry (yellow card) 39' | Stadium: Rudolf-Tonn-Stadion; Attendance: 599; Referee: (Austria) Petru Ciochirca |

| 23 September 2015 Round 2 | SV Wallern | 2–2 (a.e.t.) (2–4 p) | Admira | Wallern an der Trattnach |
| 18:00 CET | Sulimani 60'; Pecirep 104' | Summary | Bajrami 47'; Starkl 102' | Stadium: Sportplatz SV Zaunergroup Wallern; Attendance: 500; Referee: (Austria) Harald Lechner |

| 27 October 2015 Round 3 | FC Lankowitz | 0–1 | Admira | Maria Lankowitz |
| 18:00 CET | Grgić (yellow card) 39'; Grassl (yellow card) 39' | Summary | Zwierschitz 16'; Blutsch (yellow card) 22'; Lackner (yellow card) 84' | Stadium: Piberstein Arena; Attendance: 1,750; Referee: (Austria) Julian Weinberger |

| 10 February 2016 Round 4 | SK Rapid Wien | 0–1 | Admira | Wien |
| 17:00 | Schwab (yellow card) 79' | Summary | Schößwendter (yellow card) 68' (yellow-red card); Grozurek 87' | Stadium: Ernst-Happel-Stadion; Attendance: 6,200; Referee: (Austria) Christopher Jäger |

| 19 April 2016 Semi Final | Admira | 2–1 | SKN St. Pölten | Maria Enzersdorf |
| 17:00 | Grozurek (yellow card) 50' (goal) 52'; Starkl 59'; Wostry (yellow card) 79' | Summary | Hartl 50' | Stadium: Bundesstadion Südstadt; Attendance: 3,720; Referee: (Austria) Markus Hameter |

| 19 May 2016 Final | Admira | 0–5 | Red Bull Salzburg | Klagenfurt |
| 20:30 | Toth (yellow card) 61'; Starkl (yellow card) 72' | Summary | Jonathan Soriano 7' 65' 86' (pen.); Keïta 28'; Laimer 73' | Stadium: Wörthersee Stadion; Attendance: 10,200; Referee: (Austria) Robert Schörgenhofer |
