= 2016–17 FC Red Bull Salzburg season =

Red Bull Salzburg
2016–17 season
- Chairman: Georgios Esplandatkoulos
- Manager: Óscar García
- Stadium: Red Bull Arena
- Bundesliga: 1st
- Austrian Cup: Winners
- UEFA Champions League: Play-off round (vs. Dinamo Zagreb)
- UEFA Europa League: Group stage
- Top goalscorer: League: Hwang Hee-chan (12); All: Hwang Hee-chan (16)
Home colours	Away colours	Third colours

The 2016–17 FC Red Bull Salzburg season was the 84th season in club history. They were defending League and Cup champions.

== Squad ==
As of match played 1 June 2017

No.	Name	Nationality	Position	Date of birth (age)	Signed from	Signed in	Contract ends	Apps.	Goals
Goalkeepers
1	Cican Stankovic	(Austria) (Note: Cican Stankovic was born in Bijeljina, Bosnia and Herzegovina, but qualified to represent Austria internationally, representing the Austrian U-21 team in 2014.)	GK	4 November 1992 (aged 24)	SV Grödig	2015	2020	18	0
31	Carlos Miguel	(Brazil)	GK	29 December 1996 (aged 20)	Academy	2015		0	0
33	Alexander Walke	(Germany)	GK	6 June 1983 (aged 33)	Hansa Rostock	2010	2017		
34	Lawrence Ati-Zigi	(Ghana)	GK	29 November 1996 (aged 20)	Red Bull Ghana	2015		0	0
Defenders
3	Paulo Miranda	(Brazil)	DF	16 August 1988 (aged 28)	São Paulo	2015	2019	74	4
5	Duje Ćaleta-Car	(Croatia)	DF	17 September 1996 (aged 20)	Pasching	2014	2020	77	2
6	Christian Schwegler	(Switzerland)	DF	6 June 1984 (aged 32)	Young Boys	2009			
17	Andreas Ulmer	(Austria)	DF	30 October 1985 (aged 31)	SV Ried	2009			
22	Stefan Lainer	(Austria)	DF	27 August 1992 (aged 24)	SV Ried	2015	2018	72	11
23	Stefan Stangl	(Austria)	DF	20 October 1991 (aged 25)	Rapid Wien	2016		10	0
28	Asger Sørensen	(Denmark)	DF	5 June 1996 (aged 20)	Academy	2014		6	1
44	Igor	(Brazil)	DF	7 February 1998 (aged 19)	Red Bull Brasil	2016		1	0
47	Andre Wisdom	(England)	DF	9 May 1993 (aged 24)	loan from Liverpool	2016	2017	24	0
77	Luan	(Brazil)	DF	31 May 1996 (aged 21)	Red Bull Brasil	2016		1	0
Midfielders
4	Amadou Haidara	(Mali)	MF	31 January 1998 (aged 19)	JMG Academy Bamako	2016		7	2
8	Diadie Samassékou	(Mali)	MF	11 January 1996 (aged 21)	Real Bamako	2015	2019	38	0
10	Valentino Lazaro	(Austria)	MF	24 March 1996 (aged 21)	Academy	2012		118	15
11	Marc Rzatkowski	(Germany)	MF	2 March 1990 (aged 27)	FC St. Pauli	2016		13	2
13	Hannes Wolf	(Austria)	MF	16 April 1999 (aged 18)	Academy	2016		4	0
14	Valon Berisha	(Kosovo) (Note: Valon Berisha was born in Malmö, Sweden to Kosovo Albanian parents. Berisha qualified to represent Norway internationally, representing them at various levels until September 2016, when he switched to representing Kosovo.)	MF	7 February 1993 (aged 24)	Viking	2012		189	32
24	Christoph Leitgeb	(Austria)	MF	14 April 1985 (aged 32)	Sturm Graz	2007			
25	Josip Radošević	(Croatia)	MF	3 April 1994 (aged 23)	Napoli	2016		28	5
27	Konrad Laimer	(Austria)	MF	27 May 1997 (aged 20)	Academy	2014		72	8
42	Xaver Schlager	(Austria)	MF	28 September 1997 (aged 19)	Academy	2015		19	2
94	Wanderson	(Brazil)	MF	7 October 1994 (aged 22)	Getafe	2016		28	5
Forwards
18	Takumi Minamino	(Japan)	FW	16 January 1995 (aged 22)	Cerezo Osaka	2015	2018	88	30
19	Hwang Hee-chan	(South Korea)	FW	26 January 1996 (aged 21)	Pohang Steelers	2015		49	16
20	Smail Prevljak	(Bosnia and Herzegovina)	FW	10 May 1995 (aged 22)	loan from RB Leipzig	2015		11	0
29	Samuel Tetteh	(Ghana)	FW	28 July 1996 (aged 20)	West African Football Academy	2016		0	0
37	Mërgim Berisha	(Germany)	FW	11 May 1998 (aged 19)	Academy	2016		1	0
77	Dimitri Oberlin	(Switzerland) (Note: Dimitri Oberlin was born in Yaoundé, Cameroon but qualified to represent Switzerland internationally, representing them at various youth levels before making his senior debut in 2018.)	FW	27 September 1997 (aged 19)	Zürich	2015	2020	20	4
Out on loan
7	Reinhold Yabo	(Germany)	MF	10 February 1992 (aged 25)	Karlsruher SC	2015	2018	5	2
9	Mu'nas Dabbur	(Israel)	FW	14 May 1992 (aged 25)	Grasshoppers	2016		25	6
21	Fredrik Gulbrandsen	(Norway)	FW	10 September 1992 (aged 24)	Molde	2016		17	2
	Airton	(Brazil)	GK	29 May 1994 (aged 23)	Juventude	2015	2020	0	0
	Michael Brandner	(Austria)	MF	13 February 1995 (aged 22)	Academy	2013		0	0
	Ante Roguljić	(Croatia)	MF	11 March 1996 (aged 21)	Academy	2014		2	1
	Marco Djuricin	(Austria)	FW	12 December 1992 (aged 24)	Sturm Graz	2015		21	6
	David Atanga	(Ghana)	FW	25 December 1996 (aged 20)	Red Bull Ghana	2015	2020	10	0
Left during the season
4	Dayot Upamecano	(France)	DF	27 October 1998 (aged 18)	Valenciennes	2015	2018	23	0
15	Yordy Reyna	(Peru)	FW	17 September 1993 (aged 23)	Alianza Lima	2013	2017	36	3
26	Jonathan Soriano	(Spain)	FW	24 September 1985 (aged 31)	Barcelona B	2012		202	170
36	Martin Hinteregger	(Austria)	DF	7 September 1992 (aged 24)	Academy	2010			
95	Bernardo	(Brazil)	DF	14 May 1995 (aged 22)	Red Bull Brasil	2016	2020	26	3

=== Out on loan ===
Note: Flags indicate national team as defined under FIFA eligibility rules; some limited exceptions apply. Players may hold more than one non-FIFA nationality.

No.	Pos.	Nation	Player
7	MF	GER	Reinhold Yabo (at Arminia Bielefeld)
9	FW	ISR	Mu'nas Dabbur (at Grasshoppers)
21	FW	NOR	Fredrik Gulbrandsen (at New York Red Bulls)
—	GK	BRA	Airton (at Red Bull Brasil)

No.	Pos.	Nation	Player
—	MF	AUT	Michael Brandner (at SV Ried)
—	MF	CRO	Ante Roguljić (at Wacker Innsbruck)
—	FW	AUT	Marco Djuricin (at Ferencvárosi)
—	FW	GHA	David Atanga (at SV Mattersburg)

=== Left during the season ===
Note: Flags indicate national team as defined under FIFA eligibility rules; some limited exceptions apply. Players may hold more than one non-FIFA nationality.

No.	Pos.	Nation	Player
4	DF	FRA	Dayot Upamecano (to RB Leipzig)
15	FW	PER	Yordy Reyna (to Vancouver Whitecaps)
26	FW	ESP	Jonathan Soriano (to Beijing Sinobo Guoan)

No.	Pos.	Nation	Player
36	DF	AUT	Martin Hinteregger (to FC Augsburg)
95	DF	BRA	Bernardo (to RB Leipzig)

== Transfers ==
=== In ===
Date	Position	Nationality	Name	From	Fee	Ref.
1 July 2016	DF	(Austria)	Stefan Stangl	Rapid Wien	Undisclosed	
1 July 2016	MF	(Brazil)	Wanderson	Getafe	Undisclosed	
1 July 2016	MF	(Germany)	Marc Rzatkowski	FC St. Pauli	Undisclosed	
1 July 2016	FW	(Ghana)	Samuel Tetteh	West African Football Academy	Undisclosed	
1 July 2016	FW	(Norway)	Fredrik Gulbrandsen	Molde	Undisclosed	
31 August 2016	MF	(Croatia)	Josip Radošević	Napoli	Undisclosed	

=== Loans in ===
Start date	Position	Nationality	Name	From	End date	Ref.
31 August 2016	DF	(England)	Andre Wisdom	Liverpool	End of Season	

=== Out ===
Date	Position	Nationality	Name	To	Fee	Ref.
1 July 2016	DF	(Denmark)	Peter Ankersen	F.C. Copenhagen	Undisclosed	
1 July 2016	DF	(Germany)	Benno Schmitz	RB Leipzig	Undisclosed	
1 July 2016	MF	(Guinea)	Naby Keïta	RB Leipzig	Undisclosed	
28 August 2016	DF	(Brazil)	Bernardo	RB Leipzig	Undisclosed	
31 August 2016	DF	(Austria)	Martin Hinteregger	FC Augsburg	Undisclosed	
13 January 2017	DF	(France)	Dayot Upamecano	RB Leipzig	Undisclosed	
23 January 2017	FW	(Peru)	Yordy Reyna	Vancouver Whitecaps	Undisclosed	
24 February 2017	FW	(Spain)	Jonathan Soriano	Beijing Sinobo Guoan	Undisclosed	

=== Loans out ===
Start date	Position	Nationality	Name	To	End date	Ref.
13 June 2016	FW	(Ghana)	David Atanga	1. FC Heidenheim	19 January 2017	
23 June 2016	FW	(Austria)	Marco Djuricin	Ferencváros	End of Season	
15 July 2016	FW	(Switzerland)	Dimitri Oberlin	Rheindorf Altach	End of Season	
18 July 2016	MF	(Croatia)	Ante Roguljić	Admira Wacker Mödling	End of Season	
19 January 2017	MF	(Germany)	Reinhold Yabo	Arminia Bielefeld		
19 January 2017	FW	(Ghana)	David Atanga	SV Mattersburg	End of Season	
14 February 2017	FW	(Israel)	Mu'nas Dabbur	Grasshoppers		
10 March 2017	FW	(Norway)	Fredrik Gulbrandsen	New York Red Bulls	31 December 2017	

== Competitions ==
=== Overview ===
Competition	First match	Last match	Starting round	Final position	Record							
Competition	First match	Last match	Starting round	Final position	Pld	W	D	L	GF	GA	GD	Win %
Bundesliga	23 July 2016	28 May 2017	Matchday 1	Winners	36	25	6	5	74	24	+50	69.44
Austrian Cup	15 July 2016	1 June 2017	First round	Winners	6	6	0	0	21	4	+17	100.00
Champions League	12 July 2016	24 August 2017	Second qualifying round	Playoff round	6	4	1	1	8	3	+5	66.67
Europa League	15 September 2016	8 December 2016	Group stage	Group stage	6	2	1	3	6	6	+0	33.33
Total					54	37	8	9	109	37	+72	68.52

Last updated: 1 June 2017
Source: Soccerway

=== Bundesliga ===
==== League table ====
Pos	Team	Pld	W	D	L	GF	GA	GD	Pts	Qualification or relegation
1	Red Bull Salzburg (C)	36	25	6	5	74	24	+50	81	Qualification for the Champions League second qualifying round
2	Austria Wien	36	20	3	13	72	50	+22	63	Qualification for the Europa League third qualifying round
3	Sturm Graz	36	19	3	14	55	39	+16	60	Qualification for the Europa League second qualifying round
4	Rheindorf Altach	36	15	8	13	46	49	−3	53	Qualification for the Europa League first qualifying round
5	Rapid Wien	36	12	10	14	52	42	+10	46	

Source: weltfussball.de (in German), Soccerway
Rules for classification: 1) Points; 2) Goal difference; 3) Goals scored; 4) Matches won; 5) Away matches won; 6) Head-to-head points; 7) Head-to-head goal difference; 8) Head-to-head goals scored.
(C) Champions

==== Results summary ====
Overall								Home						Away					
Pld	W	D	L	GF	GA	GD	Pts	W	D	L	GF	GA	GD	W	D	L	GF	GA	GD
36	25	6	5	74	24	+50	81	14	2	2	34	8	+26	11	4	3	40	16	+24

==== Results by round ====
Round	1	2	3	4	5	6	7	8	9	10	11	12	13	14	15	16	17	18	19	20	21	22	23	24	25	26	27	28	29	30	31	32	33	34	35	36
Ground	A	H	H	A	H	A	A	H	A	H	A	A	H	A	H	A	A	H	A	H	H	A	H	A	A	H	A	H	A	A	H	A	H	H	A	H
Result	L	D	W	W	W	D	W	W	D	L	D	W	W	L	W	L	W	W	W	W	W	W	W	W	D	W	W	W	W	W	D	L	W	W	W	W
Position	9	9	5	4	4	4	3	2	2	3	3	3	3	3	3	4	4	4	2	2	1	1	1	1	1	1	1	1	1	1	1	1	1	1	1	1

Updated to match(es) played on 28 May 2017. Source: See results
A = Away; H = Home; W = Win; D = Draw; L = Loss

==== Results ====
23 July 2016 1	Sturm Graz	3–1	Red Bull Salzburg	Graz
18:30 CEST (UTC+2)	Matić 6'; Schmerböck 18'; Alar 36'	Summary	Gulbrandsen 82'; Upamecano (yellow card) 84'	Stadium: Merkur-Arena; Attendance: 7,693; Referee: Harald Lechner

30 July 2016 2	Red Bull Salzburg	1–1	Wolfsberger AC	Wals-Siezenheim
16:00 CEST (UTC+2)	Soriano 52' (pen.)	Summary	Sollbauer (yellow card) 35'; Tschernegg (yellow card) 48'; Hellquist 82'	Stadium: Red Bull Arena; Attendance: 5,493; Referee: Juilan Weinberger

6 August 2016 3	Red Bull Salzburg	2–0	St. Pölten	Wals-Siezenheim
18:30 CEST (UTC+2)	Bernardo (yellow card) 20'; Dabbur 33'; Lainer 60'	Summary	Schütz (yellow card) 59'; Brandl (yellow card) 83'	Stadium: Red Bull Arena; Attendance: 5,445; Referee: Andreas Heiß

13 August 2016 4	SV Ried	0–2	Red Bull Salzburg	Ried im Innkreis
16:00 CEST (UTC+2)		Summary	Bernardo 47'; Stangl (yellow card) 51'; Berisha 90+1'	Stadium: Keine Sorgen Arena; Attendance: 4,221; Referee: Rene Eisner

20 August 2016 5	Red Bull Salzburg	3–1	Mattersburg	Wals-Siezenheim
CEST (UTC+2)	Minamino 49'; Lainer 88'; Laimer 90+1'	Summary	Jano (yellow card) 43'; Röcher 76'	Stadium: Red Bull Arena; Attendance: 4,952; Referee: Andreas Kollegger

28 August 2016 6	Rapid Wien	0–0	Red Bull Salzburg	Vienna
16:30 CEST (UTC+2)	Močinić (yellow card) 69'; Joelinton (yellow card) 78'; Schrammel (yellow card) 90+2'	Summary	Laimer (yellow card) 42'; Upamecano (yellow card) 45+2'; Ćaleta-Car (yellow card) 78'	Stadium: Allianz Stadion; Attendance: 25,300; Referee: Markus Hameter

11 September 2016 7	Admira Wacker Mödling	0–4	Red Bull Salzburg	Maria Enzersdorf
16:30 CEST (UTC+2)		Summary	Soriano 9'; Miranda 53'; Berisha (yellow card) 59'; Wanderson (yellow card) 72'; Minamino 85', 88'	Stadium: Bundesstadion Südstadt; Attendance: 4,239; Referee: Robert Schörgenhofer

18 September 2016 8	Red Bull Salzburg	4–1	Austria Wien	Wals-Siezenheim
16:30 CEST (UTC+2)	Wanderson (yellow card) 13', (goal) 86'; Soriano 16', 49', 60'; Ćaleta-Car (yellow card) 42'; Samassékou (yellow card) 45'; Leitgeb (yellow card) 90+4'	Summary	Martschinko (yellow card) 44'; Grünwald 56', (yellow card) 59'; Serbest (yellow card) 90+4'	Stadium: Red Bull Arena; Attendance: 7,842; Referee: Alexander Harkam

25 September 2016 9	Rheindorf Altach	0–0	Red Bull Salzburg	Altach
16:30 CEST (UTC+2)		Summary	Miranda (yellow card) 23'	Stadium: Stadion Schnabelholz; Attendance: 6,693; Referee: Harald Lechner

2 October 2016 10	Red Bull Salzburg	0–1	Sturm Graz	Wals-Siezenheim
16:30 CEST (UTC+2)	Lainer (yellow card) 20' (yellow-red card) 38'; Radošević (red card) 69'; Soriano (yellow card) 89'	Summary	Jeggo (yellow card) 53'; Schulz (yellow card) 63'; Alar 66'	Stadium: Red Bull Arena; Attendance: 11,317; Referee: Julian Weinberger

15 October 2016 11	Wolfsberger AC	2–2	Red Bull Salzburg	Wolfsberg
16:00 CEST (UTC+2)	Hüttenbrenner 87'; Jacobo 90+3' (pen.)	Summary	Lazaro 45'; Soriano 85'; Upamecano (yellow card) 90+1'; Ćaleta-Car (red card) 90+2'	Stadium: Lavanttal-Arena; Attendance: 4,338; Referee: Dominik Ouschan

23 October 2016 12	St. Pölten	1–5	Red Bull Salzburg	Sankt Pölten
14:00 CEST (UTC+2)	Mader (yellow card) 35'; Martic (yellow card) 46'; Luckassen 73'	Summary	Hwang Hee-chan 14', 45+1'; Ulmer (yellow card) 39'; Rzatkowski 52'; Lainer 59'; Gulbrandsen 77'	Stadium: NV Arena; Attendance: 4,395; Referee: Manuel Schüttengruber

29 October 2016 13	Red Bull Salzburg	1–0	SV Ried	Wals-Siezenheim
18:30 CEST (UTC+2)	Hwang Hee-chan 36'; Laimer (yellow card) 53'	Summary	Möschl (yellow card) 51'	Stadium: Red Bull Arena; Attendance: 6,628; Referee: Harald Lechner

6 November 2016 14	Mattersburg	2–1	Red Bull Salzburg	Mattersburg
16:30 CET (UTC+1)	Erhardt 10'; Jano 18'; Bürger (yellow card) 51'; Farkas (yellow card) 81'	Summary	Berisha 2'; Upamecano (yellow card) 17' (yellow-red card) 90+2'	Stadium: Pappelstadion; Attendance: 2,200; Referee: Rene Eisner

20 November 2016 15	Red Bull Salzburg	2–1	Rapid Wien	Wals-Siezenheim
16:30 CET (UTC+1)	Dabbur 8'; Lainer 45+1', (yellow card) 59'; Lazaro (yellow card) 74'; Miranda (yellow card) 90+3' (yellow-red card) 90+3'	Summary	Grahovac (yellow card) 37'; Schrammel (yellow card) 71'; Tomi 90+2' (pen.), (yellow card) 90+3'; Schaub (yellow card) 90+4'; Sonnleitner (red card) 90+5'; Hofmann (yellow card) 90+7'	Stadium: Red Bull Arena; Attendance: 15,000; Referee: Alexander Harkam

27 November 2016 16	Red Bull Salzburg	0–1	Admira Wacker Mödling	Wals-Siezenheim
16:30 CET (UTC+1)	Laimer (yellow card) 53'; Dabbur (yellow card) 56'; Lainer (yellow card) 75'	Summary	Monschein 14'	Stadium: Red Bull Arena; Attendance: 5,137; Referee: Dieter Muckenhammer

30 November 2016 17	Austria Wien	1–3	Red Bull Salzburg	Vienna
20:30 CET (UTC+1)	Filipović (yellow card) 24'; Kayode 70'; Serbest (yellow card) 73'; Friesenbichler (yellow card) 85'; Holzhauser (yellow card) 90'; Windbichler (yellow card) 90+3'	Summary	Samassékou (yellow card) 40'; Martschinko 47' (o.g.); Dabbur (yellow card) 63'; Laimer 64', (yellow card) 80'; Minamino 86'	Stadium: Franz Horr Stadium; Attendance: 4,885; Referee: Robert Schörgenhofer

3 December 2016 18	Red Bull Salzburg	4–1	Rheindorf Altach	Wals-Siezenheim
18:30 CET (UTC+1)	Lainer 2'; Berisha 51'; Miranda 63'; Hwang Hee-chan 74'	Summary	Miranda 81' (o.g.); Dovedan (yellow card) 83'	Stadium: Red Bull Arena; Attendance: 3,600; Referee: Manuel Schüttengruber

11 December 2016 19	Sturm Graz	0–1	Red Bull Salzburg	Graz
16:30 CET (UTC+1)	Matić (yellow card) 25'; Jeggo (yellow card) 28'	Summary	Laimer (yellow card) 28'; Berisha 64', (yellow card) 87'; Upamecano (red card) 70'; Lainer (yellow card) 74'	Stadium: Merkur-Arena; Attendance: 10,581; Referee: Dominik Ouschan

17 December 2016 20	Red Bull Salzburg	3–0	Wolfsberger AC	Wals-Siezenheim
18:30 CET (UTC+1)	Minamino 6', 8'; Wisdom (yellow card) 11'; Ulmer 41'	Summary	Standfest (yellow card) 13'; Rabitsch (yellow card) 71'	Stadium: Red Bull Arena; Attendance: 4,681; Referee: Markus Hameter

11 February 2017 21	Red Bull Salzburg	2–0	St. Pölten	Wals-Siezenheim
18:30 CET (UTC+1)	Soriano 24'; Laimer 45+1'	Summary		Stadium: Red Bull Arena; Attendance: 5,204; Referee: Gerhard Grobelnik

19 February 2017 22	SV Ried	1–6	Red Bull Salzburg	Ried im Innkreis
16:30 CET (UTC+1)	Egho 11'; Ziegl (yellow card) 29'; Prada (yellow card) 60' (yellow-red card) 80'	Summary	Soriano 10'; Laimer (yellow card) 20'; Minamino 23', 24', 58'; Schwegler (yellow card) 69'; Radošević 71'; Hwang Hee-chan 81' (pen.)	Stadium: Keine Sorgen Arena; Attendance: 4,261; Referee: Julian Weinberger

25 February 2017 23	Red Bull Salzburg	1–0	Mattersburg	Wals-Siezenheim
18:30 CET (UTC+1)	Oberlin 61'; Berisha (yellow card) 72'; Samassékou (yellow card) 84'; Ulmer (yellow card) 90+3'	Summary	Novak (yellow card) 12'; Malić (yellow card) 69'; Fran (yellow card) 73'; Rath (yellow card) 80'	Stadium: Red Bull Arena; Attendance: 5,234; Referee: Dieter Muckenhammer

5 March 2017 24	Rapid Wien	0–1	Red Bull Salzburg	Vienna
16:30 CET (UTC+1)		Summary	Schlager (yellow card) 38'; Lazaro (yellow card) 57'; Berisha 71'	Stadium: Allianz Stadion; Attendance: 23,200; Referee: Markus Hameter

11 March 2017 25	Admira Wacker Mödling	1–1	Red Bull Salzburg	Maria Enzersdorf
18:30 CET (UTC+1)	Monschein (yellow card) 39'; Sax 56'; Leitner (yellow card) 79'	Summary	Oberlin (yellow card) 69'; Schlager 79'	Stadium: Bundesstadion Südstadt; Attendance: 2,940; Referee: Andreas Heiß

19 March 2017 26	Red Bull Salzburg	5–0	Austria Wien	Wals-Siezenheim
16:30 CET (UTC+1)	Oberlin (yellow card) 25'; Berisha 33'; Lainer (yellow card) 41'; Ulmer 48'; Hwang Hee-chan 78', 90'; Radošević 84'	Summary	Kvasina (yellow card) 90+4'	Stadium: Red Bull Arena; Attendance: 9,987; Referee: Manuel Schüttengruber

2 April 2017 27	Rheindorf Altach	0–5	Red Bull Salzburg	Altach
16:30 CEST (UTC+2)	Sakic (yellow card) 90+1'	Summary	Ulmer 9', 23'; Lazaro (yellow card) 21'; Netzer 37' (o.g.); Miranda (yellow card) 42'; Minamino 54', 61'	Stadium: Stadion Schnabelholz; Attendance: 7,462; Referee: Harald Lechner

9 April 2017 28	Red Bull Salzburg	1–0	Sturm Graz	Wals-Siezenheim
16:30 CEST (UTC+2)	Radošević 56'; Haidara (yellow card) 90+4'	Summary	Atik (yellow card) 55'; Hierländer (yellow card) 71' (yellow-red card) 90+4'; Koch (yellow card) 90+5'	Stadium: Red Bull Arena; Attendance: 13,982; Referee: Robert Schörgenhofer

15 April 2017 29	Wolfsberger AC	0–2	Red Bull Salzburg	Wolfsberg
16:00 CEST (UTC+2)	Orgill (yellow card) 48'; Drescher (yellow card) 49'; Tschernegg (yellow card) 67'	Summary	Berisha 2' (pen.), (yellow card) 18'; Laimer (yellow card) 41'; Lainer 62'	Stadium: Lavanttal-Arena; Attendance: 3,858; Referee: Dieter Muckenhammer

22 April 2017 30	St. Pölten	1–2	Red Bull Salzburg	Sankt Pölten
18:30 CEST (UTC+2)	Perchtold (yellow card) 18'; Martic (yellow card) 21'; Thürauer 81'	Summary	Radošević (yellow card) 9'; Hwang Hee-chan 11'; Miranda (yellow card) 34'; Wanderson 69', (yellow card) 75'; Walke (yellow card) 90+2'	Stadium: NV Arena; Attendance: 3,368; Referee: Andreas Heiß

29 April 2017 31	Red Bull Salzburg	1–1	SV Ried	Wals-Siezenheim
18:30 CEST (UTC+2)	Samassékou (yellow card) 32'; Hwang Hee-chan 78'; Schwegler (yellow card) 81'	Summary	Žulj 33' (pen.); Özdemir (yellow card) 60'; Ziegl (yellow card) 69'	Stadium: Red Bull Arena; Attendance: 10,321; Referee: Markus Hameter

6 May 2017 32	Mattersburg	2–1	Red Bull Salzburg	Mattersburg
16:00 CEST (UTC+2)	Maierhofer 25'; Höller (yellow card) 41'; Atanga 48'; Bürger (yellow card) 90+4'	Summary	Wanderson 10'; Schwegler (yellow card) 55'; Miranda (yellow card) 67'; Walke (yellow card) 70'	Stadium: Pappelstadion; Attendance: 5,200; Referee: Harald Lechner

13 May 2017 33	Red Bull Salzburg	1–0	Rapid Wien	Wals-Siezenheim
16:00 CEST (UTC+2)	Lazaro 73'; Miranda (yellow card) 79'; Wanderson (yellow card) 87'; Minamino (yellow card) 90+2'	Summary		Stadium: Red Bull Arena; Attendance: 15,892; Referee: Dieter Muckenhammer

20 May 2017 34	Red Bull Salzburg	2–0	Admira Wacker Mödling	Wals-Siezenheim
18:30 CEST (UTC+2)	Hwang Hee-chan 75', 89', (yellow card) 76'	Report	Sax (yellow card) 73'	Stadium: Red Bull Arena; Attendance: 6,136; Referee: Rene Eisner

25 May 2017 35	Austria Wien	2–3	Red Bull Salzburg	Vienna
16:30 CEST (UTC+2)	Ulmer 6' (o.g.); Kayode 29', (yellow card) 83'; Filipović (yellow card) 69'; Rotpuller (yellow card) 71'; Serbest (yellow card) 72'; Grünwald (yellow card) 78'	Report	Haidara 44'; Hwang Hee-chan 64'; Lazaro 66'; Laimer (yellow card) 68'; Wanderson (yellow card) 74'	Stadium: Franz Horr Stadium; Attendance: 11,054; Referee: Andreas Kollegger

28 May 2017 36	Red Bull Salzburg	1–0	Rheindorf Altach	Wals-Siezenheim
16:30 CEST (UTC+2)	Zivotic 38' (o.g.); Wisdom (yellow card) 54'	Report	Netzer (yellow card) 18'; Sakic (yellow card) 83'; Ngwat-Mahop (yellow card) 88'	Stadium: Red Bull Arena; Attendance: 9,317; Referee: Harald Lechner

=== Austrian Cup ===
15 July 2016 First round	Vorwärts Steyr	1–3	Red Bull Salzburg	Steyr
20:30 CEST (UTC+2)	J. Martinović (yellow card) 53'; P. Bader (yellow card) 60'; M. Halbartschlager (yellow card) 86'; S. Gotthartsleitner 90+4'	Summary	Lainer 61' (pen.); Bernardo 78'; Minamino 90+2'	Stadium: Vorwärtsstadion; Attendance: 3,700; Referee: Markus Hameter

21 September 2016 Second round	SC Mannsdorf	1–7	Red Bull Salzburg	Mannsdorf an der Donau
19:00 CEST (UTC+2)	Casanova 25'	Summary	Rzatkowski 2'; Sørensen 20'; Hwang Hee-chan 22'; Stangl (yellow card) 26'; Lainer 36'; Dabbur 42', 85'; Yabo 90' (pen.)	Stadium: Aulandstadion; Attendance: 2,000; Referee: Oliver Drachta

26 October 2016 Third round	Red Bull Salzburg	2–0	Floridsdorfer AC	Wals-Siezenheim
16:00 CEST (UTC+2)	Yabo 7'; Dabbur 34'	Summary		Stadium: Red Bull Arena; Attendance: 2,834; Referee: Andreas Heiß

5 April 2017 Quarter-finals	Red Bull Salzburg	2–1 (a.e.t.)	Kapfenberger SV	Wals-Siezenheim
19:00 CEST (UTC+2)	Radošević (yellow card) 19', (goal) 20'; Schlager (yellow card) 65'; Haidara 110'	Summary	Sá 8'; Frieser (yellow card) 51'; Meusburger (yellow card) 73'; Budnik (yellow card) 81'	Stadium: Red Bull Arena; Attendance: 2,856; Referee: Gerhard Grobelnik

26 April 2017 Semi-finals	Admira Wacker Mödling	0–5	Red Bull Salzburg	Maria Enzersdorf
18:00 CEST (UTC+2)		Summary	Minamino 7', 87'; Wanderson 29'; Laimer 48'; Lazaro 60'	Stadium: Bundesstadion Südstadt; Attendance: 2,500; Referee: Julian Weinberger

1 June 2017 Final	Rapid Wien	1–2	Red Bull Salzburg	Klagenfurt
20:30 CEST (UTC+2)	Joelinton 56'; Murg (yellow card) 74'; Dibon (yellow card) 90+5'	Report	Lainer (yellow card) 17'; Hwang Hee-chan 51'; Lazaro 84'	Stadium: Wörthersee Stadion; Referee: Markus Hameter

=== UEFA Champions League ===
==== Qualifying rounds ====
12 July 2016 Second qualifying round 1st leg	Red Bull Salzburg (Austria)	1–0	(Latvia) Liepāja	Wals-Siezenheim, Austria
20:30 CEST (UTC+2)	Soriano 83'	Report	Doroševs (yellow card) 79'; T. Gucs (yellow card) 90'	Stadium: Red Bull Arena; Attendance: 6,917; Referee: Enea Jorgji (Albania)

19 July 2016 Second qualifying round 2nd leg	Liepāja (Latvia)	0–2 (0–3 agg.)	(Austria) Red Bull Salzburg	Liepāja, Latvia
18:00 CEST (UTC+2)	Grebis (yellow card) 15'; T. Gucs (yellow card) 40'; Kļava (yellow card) 45+2'	Report	Berisha 35'; Ulmer (yellow card) 48'; Bernardo 65'	Stadium: Daugava Stadium; Attendance: 3,633; Referee: Jonathan Lardot (Belgium)

26 July 2016 Third qualifying round 1st leg	Partizani Tirana (Albania)	0–1	(Austria) Red Bull Salzburg	Elbasan, Albania
20:15 CEST (UTC+2)	Ibrahimi (yellow card) 52'; Kalari (red card) 72'	Report	Schwegler (yellow card) 45'; Samassékou (yellow card) 50' (yellow-red card) 53'; Soriano 70' (pen.); Berisha (yellow card) 84'	Stadium: Elbasan Arena; Attendance: 4,000; Referee: Michael Oliver (England)
Note: Partizani Tirana played their home matches at Elbasan Arena, Elbasan, instead of their regular stadium Selman Stërmasi Stadium, Tirana.

3 August 2016 Third qualifying round 2nd leg	Red Bull Salzburg (Austria)	2–0 (3–0 agg.)	(Albania) Partizani Tirana	Wals-Siezenheim, Austria
20:30 CEST (UTC+2)	Lazaro (yellow card) 45+1'; Soriano 76'; Wanderson 81'	Report	Vila (yellow card) 51'	Stadium: Red Bull Arena; Attendance: 7,853; Referee: Ivan Kružliak (Slovakia)

16 August 2016 Play-off round 1st leg	Dinamo Zagreb (Croatia)	1–1	(Austria) Red Bull Salzburg	Zagreb, Croatia
20:45 CEST (UTC+2)	Sigali (yellow card) 37'; Rog 76' (pen.)	Report	Ćaleta-Car (yellow card) 27'; Lazaro 59'; Hinteregger (yellow card) 73'	Stadium: Stadion Maksimir; Attendance: 13,784; Referee: Anastasios Sidiropoulos (Greece)

24 August 2016 Play-off round 2nd leg	Red Bull Salzburg (Austria)	1–2 (a.e.t.) (2–3 agg.)	(Croatia) Dinamo Zagreb	Wals-Siezenheim, Austria
20:45 CEST (UTC+2)	Lazaro 22', (yellow card) 22'; Samassékou (yellow card) 103'; Ćaleta-Car (yellow card) 120+1'	Report	Sigali (yellow card) 31'; Jonas (yellow card) 59'; Stojanović (yellow card) 78'; Fernandes 87'; Soudani 95'	Stadium: Red Bull Arena; Attendance: 23,451; Referee: Craig Thomson (Scotland)

=== UEFA Europa League ===
==== Group stage ====
Pos	Team	Pld	W	D	L	GF	GA	GD	Pts	Qualification	SCH	KRA	SAL	NCE
1	(Germany) Schalke 04	6	5	0	1	9	3	+6	15	Advance to knockout phase	—	2–0	3–1	2–0
2	(Russia) Krasnodar	6	2	1	3	8	8	0	7	Advance to knockout phase	0–1	—	1–1	5–2
3	(Austria) Red Bull Salzburg	6	2	1	3	6	6	0	7		2–0	0–1	—	0–1
4	(France) Nice	6	2	0	4	5	11	−6	6		0–1	2–1	0–2	—

Source: UEFA

15 September 2016 1	Red Bull Salzburg (Austria)	0–1	(Russia) Krasnodar	Wals-Siezenheim, Austria
21:05 CEST (UTC+2)	Samassékou (yellow card) 67'; Soriano (yellow card) 90+5'	Report	Joãozinho 37'; Petrov (yellow card) 47' (yellow-red card) 71'; Kaboré (yellow card) 51'; Laborde (yellow card) 86'	Stadium: Red Bull Arena; Attendance: 6,507; Referee: Miroslav Zelinka (Czech Republic)

29 September 2016 2	Schalke 04 (Germany)	3–1	(Austria) Red Bull Salzburg	Gelsenkirchen, Germany
19:00 CEST (UTC+2)	Goretzka 15'; Ćaleta-Car 47' (o.g.); Höwedes 58'	Report	Laimer (yellow card) 25'; Upamecano (yellow card) 33'; Soriano 72', (yellow card) 90+1'; Ćaleta-Car (yellow card) 76'	Stadium: Veltins-Arena; Attendance: 48,374; Referee: Serdar Gözübüyük (Netherlands)

20 October 2016 3	Red Bull Salzburg (Austria)	0–1	(France) Nice	Wals-Siezenheim, Austria
19:00 CEST (UTC+2)	Hwang Hee-chan (yellow card) 85'; Laimer (yellow card) 88'	Report	Pléa 13'; Dalbert (yellow card) 71'; Eysseric (yellow card) 90+4'	Stadium: Red Bull Arena; Attendance: 9,473; Referee: Yevhen Aranovsky (Ukraine)

3 November 2016 4	Nice (France)	0–2	(Austria) Red Bull Salzburg	Nice, France
21:05 CET (UTC+1)	Koziello (yellow card) 63'; Balotelli (yellow card) 89'	Report	Laimer (yellow card) 54'; Hwang Hee-chan 72', 73'; Upamecano (yellow card) 90+3'	Stadium: Allianz Riviera; Attendance: 17,582; Referee: Hüseyin Göçek (Turkey)

24 November 2016 5	Krasnodar (Russia)	1–1	(Austria) Red Bull Salzburg	Krasnodar
19:00 CET (UTC+1)	Kaleshin (yellow card) 57'; Laborde (yellow card) 76'; Smolov 85'	Report	Dabbur 37'; Berisha (yellow card) 42'	Stadium: Krasnodar Stadium; Attendance: 19,150; Referee: Liran Liany (Israel)

8 December 2016 6	Red Bull Salzburg (Austria)	2–0	(Germany) Schalke 04	Wals-Siezenheim, Austria
21:05 CEST (UTC+2)	Schlager 22'; Radošević 90+4'	Report		Stadium: Red Bull Arena; Referee: Radu Petrescu (Romania)

== Statistics ==
As of match played 1 June 2017

=== Appearances and goals ===
No.	Pos	Nat	Player	Total		Bundesliga		Austrian Cup		UEFA Champions League		UEFA Europa League	
No.	Pos	Nat	Player	Apps	Goals	Apps	Goals	Apps	Goals	Apps	Goals	Apps	Goals
1	GK	(Austria) AUT	Cican Stankovic	9	0	2	0	6	0	0	0	1	0
3	DF	(Brazil) BRA	Paulo Miranda	36	2	27	2	2	0	2	0	5	0
5	DF	(Croatia) CRO	Duje Ćaleta-Car	31	0	17+1	0	4+1	0	4+1	0	3	0
6	DF	(Switzerland) SUI	Christian Schwegler	23	0	10+3	0	2+1	0	6	0	1	0
8	MF	(Mali) MLI	Diadie Samassékou	38	0	24+3	0	3+1	0	1+3	0	2+1	0
10	MF	(Austria) AUT	Valentino Lazaro	46	7	26+3	3	4+1	2	6	2	6	0
11	MF	(Germany) GER	Marc Rzatkowski	13	2	6+1	1	2	1	0	0	3+1	0
13	MF	(Austria) AUT	Hannes Wolf	4	0	1+2	0	0	0	0	0	0+1	0
14	MF	(Kosovo) KOS	Valon Berisha	47	8	33+1	7	2+2	0	6	1	3	0
17	DF	(Austria) AUT	Andreas Ulmer	43	4	29+1	4	2	0	6	0	5	0
18	FW	(Japan) JPN	Takumi Minamino	31	14	11+10	11	5	3	0+1	0	2+2	0
19	FW	(South Korea) KOR	Hwang Hee-chan	35	16	20+6	12	3+3	2	0	0	0+3	2
22	DF	(Austria) AUT	Stefan Lainer	44	9	30+1	6	4	2+1	0+4	0	3+2	0
23	DF	(Austria) AUT	Stefan Stangl	10	0	5+1	0	4	0	0	0	0	0
24	MF	(Austria) AUT	Christoph Leitgeb	11	0	1+7	0	2+1	0	0	0	0	0
25	MF	(Croatia) CRO	Josip Radošević	28	5	8+12	3	3	1	0	0	4+1	1
27	MF	(Austria) AUT	Konrad Laimer	43	4	27+4	3	2	1	6	0	4	0
28	DF	(Denmark) DEN	Asger Sørensen	1	1	0	0	1	1	0	0	0	0
33	GK	(Germany) GER	Alexander Walke	45	0	34	0	0	0	6	0	5	0
37	FW	(Kosovo) KOS	Mërgim Berisha	1	0	0+1	0	0	0	0	0	0	0
42	MF	(Austria) AUT	Xaver Schlager	17	2	7+6	1	2	0	0	0	1+1	1
47	DF	(England) ENG	Andre Wisdom	24	0	13+3	0	3	0	0	0	5	0
77	FW	(Switzerland) SUI	Dimitri Oberlin	5	1	1+4	1	0	0	0	0	0	0
94	MF	(Brazil) BRA	Wanderson	28	5	9+11	3	2+1	1	2+1	1	1+1	0
Players also registered for Liefering :
4	MF	(Mali) MLI	Amadou Haidara	7	2	1+4	1	0+2	1	0	0	0	0
44	DF	(Brazil) BRA	Igor	1	0	1	0	0	0	0	0	0	0
77	DF	(Brazil) BRA	Luan	1	0	0	0	0+1	0	0	0	0	0
Players away on loan :
7	MF	(Germany) GER	Reinhold Yabo	5	2	0+2	0	1+1	2	0	0	0+1	0
9	FW	(Israel) ISR	Mu'nas Dabbur	25	6	12+3	2	2	3	4	0	2+2	1
21	FW	(Norway) NOR	Fredrik Gulbrandsen	17	2	4+5	2	2	0	0+3	0	3	0
Players who left Red Bull Salzburg during the season:
4	DF	(France) FRA	Dayot Upamecano	21	0	15	0	1	0	0+1	0	4	0
15	FW	(Peru) PER	Yordy Reyna	5	0	2	0	1+1	0	0+1	0	0	0
26	FW	(Spain) ESP	Jonathan Soriano	23	12	12+1	8	0	0	6	3	3+1	1
36	DF	(Austria) AUT	Martin Hinteregger	11	0	5	0	0	0	6	0	0	0
95	DF	(Brazil) BRA	Bernardo	10	3	3	1	1	1	6	1	0	0

=== Goal scorers ===
Place	Position	Nation	Number	Name	Bundesliga	Austrian Cup	UEFA Champions League	UEFA Europa League	Total
1	FW	(South Korea)	19	Hwang Hee-chan	12	2	0	2	16
2	FW	(Japan)	18	Takumi Minamino	11	3	0	0	14
3	FW	(Spain)	26	Jonathan Soriano	8	0	3	1	12
4	DF	(Austria)	22	Stefan Lainer	6	3	0	0	9
5	MF	(Kosovo)	14	Valon Berisha	7	0	1	0	8
6	MF	(Austria)	10	Valentino Lazaro	3	2	2	0	7
7	FW	(Israel)	9	Mu'nas Dabbur	2	3	0	1	6
8	MF	(Croatia)	25	Josip Radošević	3	1	0	1	5
8	MF	(Brazil)	94	Wanderson	3	1	1	0	5
10	DF	(Austria)	17	Andreas Ulmer	4	0	0	0	4
11	MF	(Austria)	27	Konrad Laimer	3	0	0	0	3
11	MF	(Brazil)	95	Bernardo	1	1	1	0	3
11				Own goal	3	0	0	0	3
14	FW	(Norway)	21	Fredrik Gulbrandsen	2	0	0	0	2
14	DF	(Brazil)	3	Paulo Miranda	2	0	0	0	2
14	MF	(Germany)	11	Marc Rzatkowski	1	1	0	0	2
14	MF	(Mali)	4	Amadou Haidara	1	1	0	0	2
14	MF	(Austria)	42	Xaver Schlager	1	0	0	1	2
14	MF	(Germany)	7	Reinhold Yabo	0	2	0	0	2
20	FW	(Switzerland)	77	Dimitri Oberlin	1	0	0	0	1
20	DF	(Denmark)	28	Asger Sørensen	0	1	0	0	1
				TOTALS	74	21	8	6	109

=== Clean sheets ===
Place	Position	Nation	Number	Name	Bundesliga	Austrian Cup	UEFA Champions League	UEFA Europa League	Total
1	GK	(Germany)	33	Alexander Walke	17	0	4	1	22
2	GK	(Austria)	1	Cican Stankovic	1	2	0	1	4
				TOTALS	18	2	4	2	26

=== Disciplinary record ===
Number	Nation	Position	Name	Bundesliga		Austrian Cup		UEFA Champions League		UEFA Europa League		Total	
Number	Nation	Position	Name	Yellow card	Red card	Yellow card	Red card	Yellow card	Red card	Yellow card	Red card	Yellow card	Red card
3	(Brazil)	DF	Paulo Miranda	7	1	0	0	0	0	0	0	7	1
4	(Mali)	DF	Amadou Haidara	1	0	0	0	0	0	0	0	1	0
5	(Croatia)	DF	Duje Ćaleta-Car	2	1	0	0	2	0	1	0	5	1
6	(Switzerland)	DF	Christian Schwegler	3	0	0	0	1	0	0	0	4	0
8	(Mali)	MF	Diadie Samassékou	4	0	0	0	3	1	1	0	8	1
10	(Austria)	MF	Valentino Lazaro	3	0	0	0	2	0	0	0	5	0
14	(Kosovo)	MF	Valon Berisha	4	0	0	0	1	0	1	0	6	0
17	(Austria)	DF	Andreas Ulmer	2	0	0	0	1	0	0	0	3	0
18	(Japan)	FW	Takumi Minamino	1	0	0	0	0	0	0	0	1	0
19	(South Korea)	FW	Hwang Hee-chan	1	0	0	0	0	0	1	0	2	0
22	(Austria)	DF	Stefan Lainer	4	0	1	0	0	0	0	0	5	0
23	(Austria)	DF	Stefan Stangl	1	0	1	0	0	0	0	0	2	0
24	(Austria)	MF	Christoph Leitgeb	1	0	0	0	0	0	0	0	1	0
25	(Croatia)	MF	Josip Radošević	1	1	1	0	0	0	0	0	2	1
27	(Austria)	MF	Konrad Laimer	10	1	0	0	0	0	3	0	13	1
33	(Germany)	GK	Alexander Walke	2	0	0	0	0	0	0	0	2	0
42	(Austria)	MF	Xaver Schlager	1	0	1	0	0	0	0	0	2	0
47	(England)	DF	Andre Wisdom	2	0	0	0	0	0	0	0	2	0
77	(Switzerland)	FW	Dimitri Oberlin	2	0	0	0	0	0	0	0	2	0
94	(Brazil)	MF	Wanderson	5	0	0	0	0	0	0	0	5	0
Players away on loan:
9	(Israel)	FW	Mu'nas Dabbur	2	0	0	0	0	0	0	0	2	0
Players who left Red Bull Salzburg during the season:
4	(France)	DF	Dayot Upamecano	5	2	0	0	0	0	2	0	7	2
26	(Spain)	FW	Jonathan Soriano	1	0	0	0	0	0	2	0	3	0
36	(Austria)	DF	Martin Hinteregger	0	0	0	0	1	0	0	0	1	0
95	(Brazil)	DF	Bernardo	1	0	0	0	0	0	0	0	1	0
			TOTALS	66	6	4	0	11	1	11	0	92	7
