= 2022–23 FC Admira Wacker Mödling season =

Admira Wacker Mödling
2022–23 season
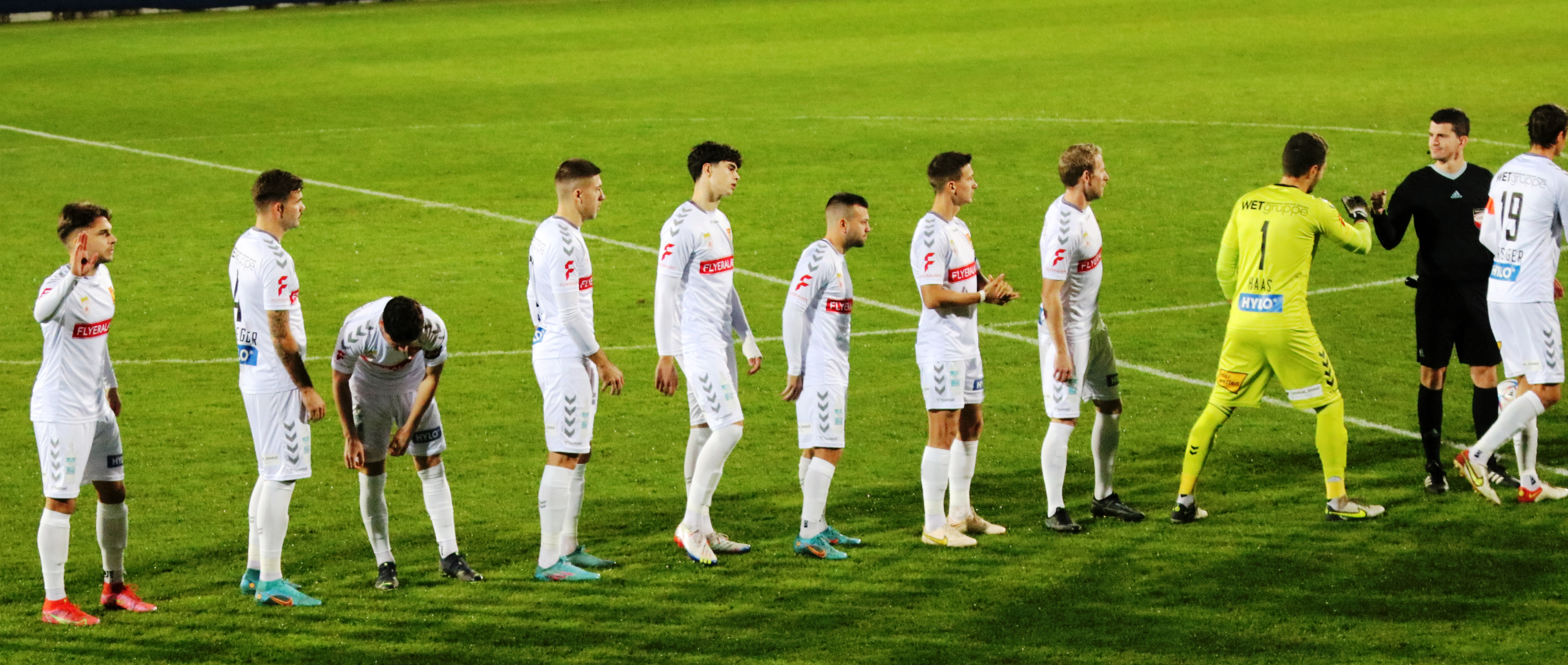
- Admira ahead of their 2. Liga match against FC Liefering on 11 November 2022
- Manager: Rolf Landerl (from 6 November to 26 April); Tommy Wright (from 26 April)
- Stadium: Motion invest Arena
- Austrian Football Second League: 10th
- Austrian Cup: Third round
- Top goalscorer: League: Angelo Gattermayer (6); All: Angelo Gattermayer (6)

The 2022–23 season was the 118th in the history of FC Admira Wacker Mödling and their first season back in the second division. The club participated in the Austrian Football Second League and the Austrian Cup.

== Players ==
=== First team squad ===
As of 1 January 2023

Note: Flags indicate national team as defined under FIFA eligibility rules; some limited exceptions apply. Players may hold more than one non-FIFA nationality.

No.	Pos.	Nation	Player
1	GK	AUT	Christoph Haas
2	DF	AUT	Muhammet Araz
3	DF	AUT	Julian Buchta
4	DF	AUT	Patrick Puchegger
5	DF	AUT	Thomas Ebner
6	MF	AUT	Lukas Malicsek
7	FW	AUT	Angelo Gattermayer
8	DF	AUT	Stephan Zwierschitz
9	FW	AUT	Patrick Schmidt
11	FW	GER	Jakob Tranziska
14	FW	SEN	Mamina Badji
15	FW	AUT	Martin Krienzer
17	MF	AUT	Aleksandar Kostić
18	DF	AUT	Jakob Schöller

No.	Pos.	Nation	Player
19	MF	AUT	Wilhelm Vorsager
20	MF	AUT	Martin Rasner
21	MF	AUT	Raphael Gallé
22	MF	AUT	Filip Ristanic
23	GK	AUT	Belmin Jenčiragić
24	MF	BIH	Nadir Ajanović
27	MF	AUT	Marco Wagner
29	FW	BUL	Vladimir Nikolov
31	DF	AUT	David Puczka
35	DF	GER	Nicolas Keckeisen
37	DF	AUT	Leonardo Lukačević
44	GK	AUT	Dominik Sulzer
77	MF	SRB	Andrej Stevanovic
—	MF	TUR	Melih İbrahimoğlu (on loan from Heracles Almelo)

=== Out on loan ===
Note: Flags indicate national team as defined under FIFA eligibility rules; some limited exceptions apply. Players may hold more than one non-FIFA nationality.

No.	Pos.	Nation	Player
—	MF	AUT	Tizian Marth (at ASV Draßburg until 30 June 2023)
—	MF	AUT	Kevin Sostarits (at Vorwärts Steyr until 30 June 2023)

No.	Pos.	Nation	Player
—	FW	AUT	Tin Vastić (at Traiskirchen until 30 June 2023)

== Pre-season and friendlies ==
Win Draw Loss

June 2022 Friendly	(Austria)	–	(Austria)	Austria
CEST (UTC+2)

January 2023 Friendly	(Austria)	–	(Austria)	Austria
CET (UTC+1)

== Competitions ==
=== Overall record ===
Competition	First match	Last match	Starting round	Final position	Record							
Competition	First match	Last match	Starting round	Final position	Pld	W	D	L	GF	GA	GD	Win %
Austrian Football Second League	24 July 2022	4 June 2023	Matchday 1	10th	30	10	6	14	39	42	−3	33.33
Austrian Cup	16–17 July 2022		First round		0	0	0	0	0	0	+0	—
Total					30	10	6	14	39	42	−3	33.33

Source: Soccerway

=== Austrian Football Second League ===
==== League table ====
Pos	Team	Pld	W	D	L	GF	GA	GD	Pts
8	SV Lafnitz	30	12	5	13	47	46	+1	41
9	FC Liefering	30	11	4	15	52	54	−2	37
10	Admira Wacker	30	10	6	14	39	42	−3	36
11	FC Dornbirn	30	10	5	15	43	44	−1	35
12	Kapfenberger SV	30	9	7	14	40	56	−16	34

Updated to match(es) played on 4 June 2023. Source: 2.Liga Table
Rules for classification: 1) Points; 2) Direct Duel; 3) Goal difference; 4) Goals scored; 5) Matches won; 6) Away matches won; 7) Away goals scored

==== Results summary ====
Overall								Home						Away					
Pld	W	D	L	GF	GA	GD	Pts	W	D	L	GF	GA	GD	W	D	L	GF	GA	GD
30	10	6	14	39	42	−3	36	7	2	6	21	20	+1	3	4	8	18	22	−4

Source: ADMIRAL 2. Liga

==== Results by round ====
Round	1	2	3	4	5	6	7	8	9	10	11	12	13	14	15	16	17	18	19	20	21	22	23	24	25	26	27	28	29
Ground	A	H	A	H	A	H	A	H	A	A	H	H	A	H	A	H	A	H	A	H	A	H	A	H	A	A	H	A	H
Result	L	W	D	W	D	W	L	L	W	L	W	D	L	L	L	L	L	W	D	D	L	L	L	L	W	W	L	D	W
Position																													

Source: ADMIRAL 2. Liga
A = Away; H = Home; W = Win; D = Draw; L = Loss

==== Matches ====
The league fixtures were announced on 24 June 2022.

=== Austrian Cup ===
17 July 2022 First round	Purgstall	2–4	Admira Wacker Mödling	Purgstall an der Erlauf
16:00 CEST (UTC+2)				Stadium: Fliederstadion

30 August 2022 Second round	Admira Wacker Mödling	3–0	Rheindorf Altach
CEST (UTC+2)

19 October 2022 Third round	Admira Wacker Mödling	1–6	Red Bull Salzburg
CEST (UTC+2)
