= Florian Fischerauer =

Austrian footballer (born 1999)

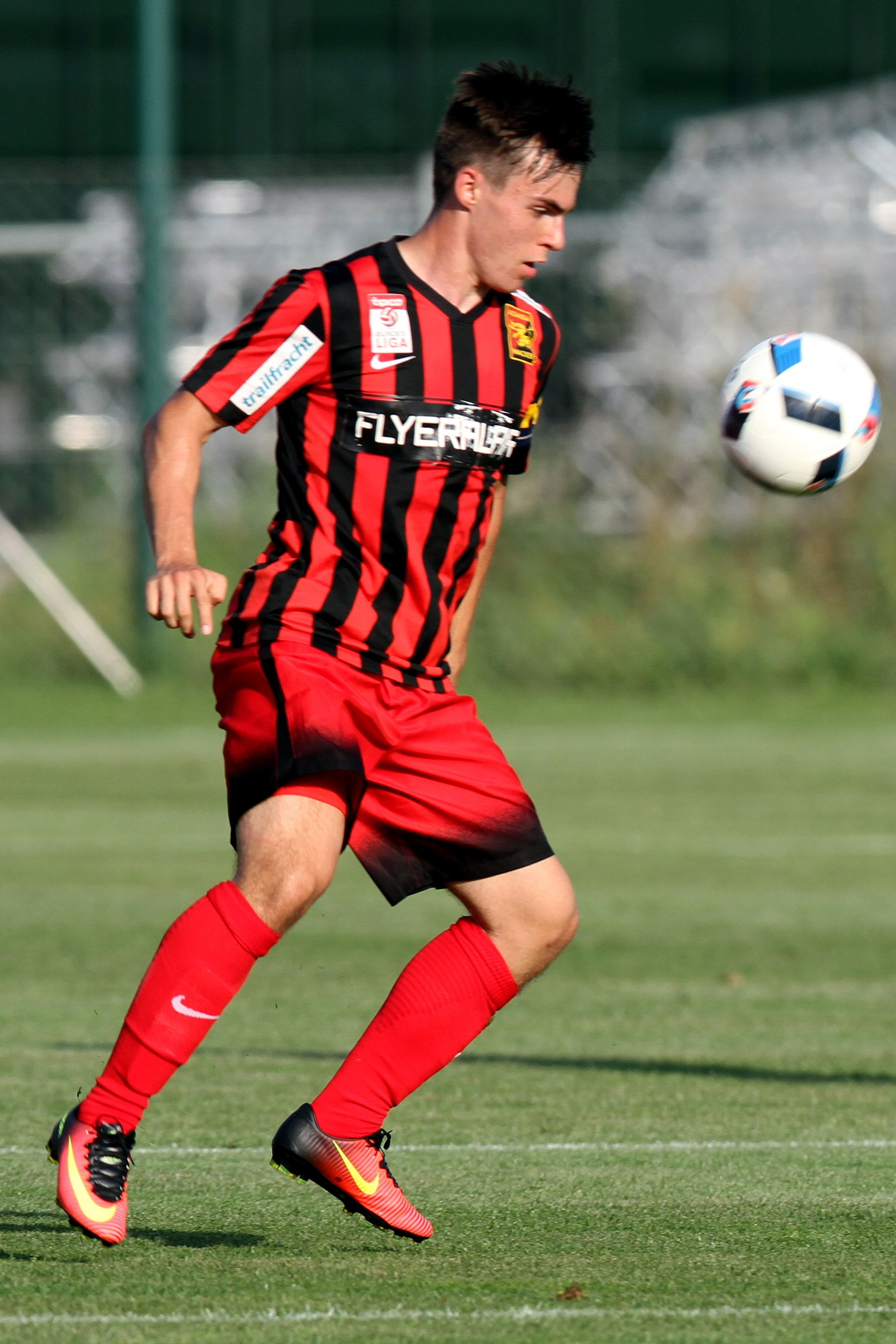
- Florian Fischerauer (2016)

Personal information
- Full name: Florian Fischerauer
- Date of birth: 1 January 1999 (age 27)
- Height: 1.69 m (5 ft 6 1/2 in)
- Position: Midfielder

Team information
- Current team: FCM Traiskirchen
- Number: 10

Youth career
- –2015: Admira Wacker

Senior career*
Years	Team	Apps	(Gls)
2015–2020	Admira Wacker II	73	(8)
2016–2019	Admira Wacker	2	(0)
2020	Traiskirchen	9	(3)
2021–2023	Young Violets	60	(12)
2023–2025	SV Horn	39	(4)
2025–	FCM Traiskirchen	23	(7)

International career
2014	Austria U15	2	(0)
2014–2015	Austria U16	12	(2)
2015	Austria U17	2	(1)
2016	Austria U18	3	(1)
2018	Austria U19	2	(1)
- * Club domestic league appearances and goals as of 28 June 2026

Florian Fischerauer (born 1 January 1999) is an Austrian footballer who plays as a midfielder for FCM Traiskirchen.
