= Daniel Toth =

Austrian footballer

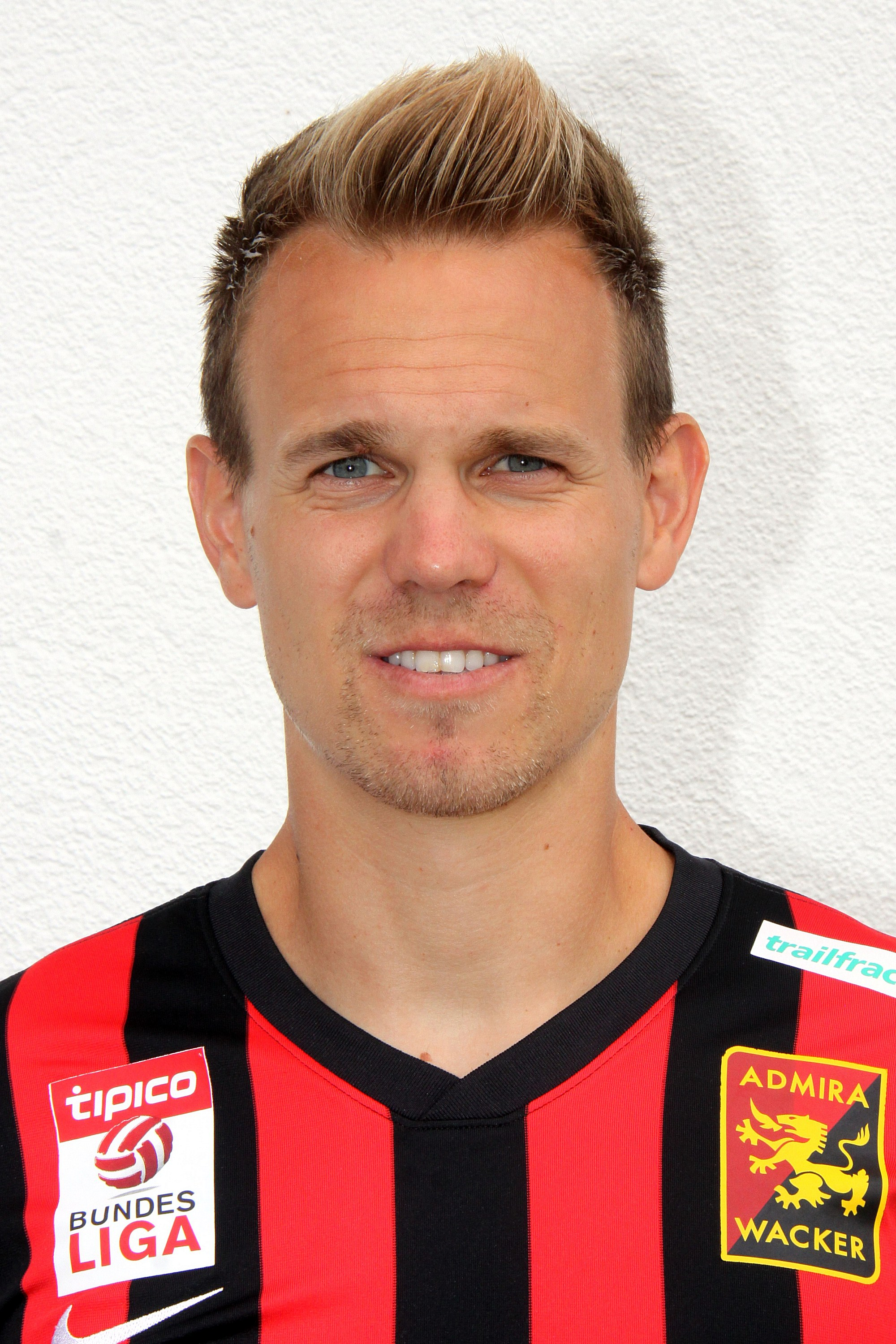

Personal information
- Full name: Daniel Toth
- Date of birth: 10 June 1987 (age 39)
- Place of birth: Wien, Austria
- Height: 1.73 m (5 ft 8 in)
- Position: Midfielder

Team information
- Current team: Neusiedl am See (player-assistant)
- Number: 10

Youth career
- 1995–2002: Neusiedl am See
- 2002–2003: BNZ Burgenland
- 2003–2005: SC-ESV Parndorf

Senior career*
Years	Team	Apps	(Gls)
2007–2008	SV Ried	35	(2)
2008–2020	Admira Wacker	259	(23)
2020–2021	SV Stripfing		
2021–	Neusiedl am See	12	(0)

International career
2007–2008	Austria U-20	3	(0)
2007–2008	Austria U-21	2	(1)

Managerial career
- 2021–: Neusiedl am See (player-assistant)
- * Club domestic league appearances and goals as of 17:51, 26 December 2021 (UTC)

Daniel Toth (born 10 June 1987) is an Austrian professional football midfielder who plays for SC Neusiedl am See 1919.

== Later career ==
On 11 May 2021 it was confirmed, that Toth would return to his former club SC Neusiedl am See 1919 on 1 July 2021 as a playing assistant manager.
