= Thomas Ebner =

Austrian footballer (born 1992)

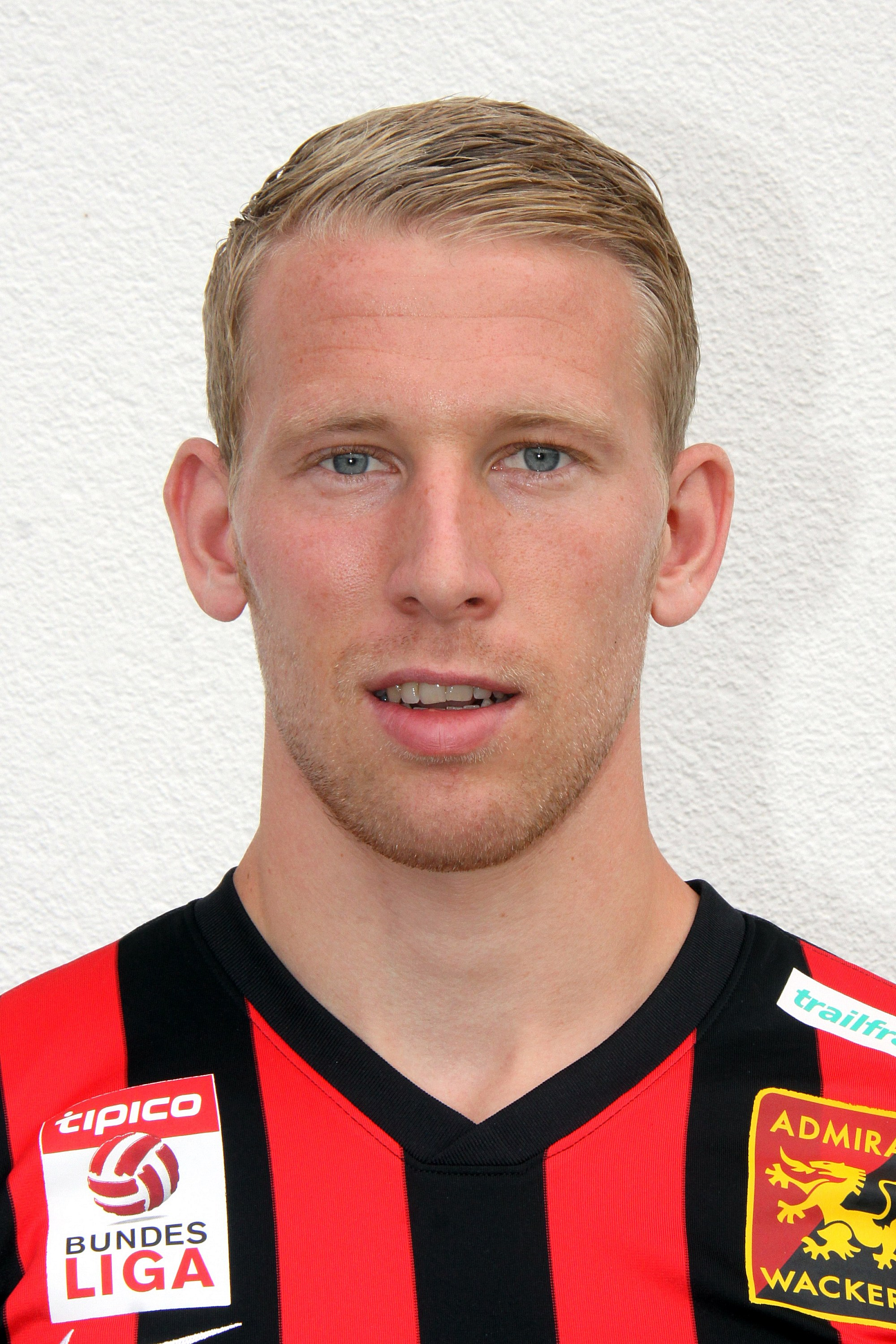
- Ebner with Admira Wacker in 2015

Personal information
- Date of birth: 22 February 1992 (age 34)
- Place of birth: Baden bei Wien, Austria
- Height: 1.80 m (5 ft 11 in)
- Position: Defensive midfielder

Team information
- Current team: FCM Traiskirchen
- Number: 25

Youth career
- 1997–2002: 1. SVg Wiener Neudorf
- 2002–2010: Admira Wacker

Senior career*
| Years | Team | Apps | (Gls) |
| 2010–2012 | Admira Wacker II | 69 | (0) |
| 2010–2018 | Admira Wacker | 175 | (3) |
| 2018–2021 | Austria Wien | 66 | (1) |
| 2021–2025 | Admira Wacker | 78 | (3) |
| 2025– | FCM Traiskirchen | 28 | (1) |

International career
| 2007 | Austria U16 | 1 | (0) |
- * Club domestic league appearances and goals as of 28 June 2026

Thomas Ebner (born 22 February 1992) is an Austrian professional footballer who plays as a midfielder for FCM Traiskirchen.

== Club career ==
Ebner started his career in the youth department of 1. SVg Wiener Neudorf in Lower Austria. In 2002, he joined Admira Wacker's youth academy. From 2002 until 2010, Ebner honed his skills in Admira's youth divisions before earning a promotion to the amateur team. He made his debut in the Austrian Regionalliga East on 12 March 2010, against the amateurs of SV Mattersburg, contributing to a 3–0 away victory. This marked the initiation of his regular presence as a right-back. During the winter break of 2012, he received the call-up to the first-team squad.

Ebner's debut in the Austrian Bundesliga transpired under the guidance of coach Dietmar Kühbauer on 24 March 2012, against eventual champions Red Bull Salzburg. He played the full match, which ended in a 2–2 draw.

Following an impressive stint of over 170 Bundesliga games with Admira, he moved to league rival Austria Wien for the 2018–19 season, where he signed a contract that ran until June 2021. Over the course of three seasons with Austria Wien, he made 66 Bundesliga appearances, before departing the club after the 2020–21 season.

After two months without a club, Ebner returned to Admira on 1 September 2021 on a season-long deal. At Admira, Ebner quickly secured a regular spot as a defensive midfielder. In April 2022, he extended his expiring contract until June 2024. After their relegation to the 2. Liga, he decided to extend his contract once again in June 2022, keeping him a Panther until 2025.

== International career ==
Ebner received one international call-up for the Austria national under-16 team. He gained his first national cap on 13 November 2007, against Turkey U16 in Istanbul. The game, which included Admira Wacker teammates such as Christoph Knasmüllner and Lukas Rath, ended in a 4–0 loss for the Austrians.

== Career statistics ==
As of match played 1 December 2023

Appearances and goals by club, season and competition
| Club | Season | League | | | Austrian Cup | | Europe | | Other | | Total | |
| Club | Season | Division | Apps | Goals | Apps | Goals | Apps | Goals | Apps | Goals | Apps | Goals |
|---|---|---|---|---|---|---|---|---|---|---|---|---|
| Admira Wacker II | 2009–10 | Regionalliga East | 13 | 0 | — | | — | | — | | 13 | 0 |
| Admira Wacker II | 2010–11 | Regionalliga East | 25 | 0 | 1 | 0 | — | | — | | 26 | 0 |
| Admira Wacker II | 2011–12 | Regionalliga East | 19 | 0 | 0 | 0 | — | | — | | 19 | 0 |
| Admira Wacker II | 2012–13 | Regionalliga East | 12 | 0 | 0 | 0 | — | | — | | 12 | 0 |
| Admira Wacker II | Total | | 69 | 0 | 1 | 0 | — | | — | | 70 | 0 |
| Admira Wacker | 2011–12 | Austrian Bundesliga | 3 | 0 | 0 | 0 | — | | — | | 3 | 0 |
| Admira Wacker | 2012–13 | Austrian Bundesliga | 15 | 0 | 0 | 0 | — | | — | | 15 | 0 |
| Admira Wacker | 2013–14 | Austrian Bundesliga | 32 | 0 | 2 | 0 | — | | — | | 34 | 0 |
| Admira Wacker | 2014–15 | Austrian Bundesliga | 26 | 0 | 1 | 1 | — | | — | | 27 | 1 |
| Admira Wacker | 2015–16 | Austrian Bundesliga | 34 | 0 | 4 | 0 | — | | — | | 38 | 0 |
| Admira Wacker | 2016–17 | Austrian Bundesliga | 33 | 2 | 4 | 0 | 6 (Note: Appearance(s) in UEFA Europa League) | 0 | — | | 43 | 2 |
| Admira Wacker | 2017–18 | Austrian Bundesliga | 32 | 1 | 2 | 0 | — | | — | | 34 | 1 |
| Admira Wacker | Total | | 175 | 3 | 13 | 1 | 6 | 0 | — | | 194 | 4 |
| Austria Wien | 2018–19 | Austrian Bundesliga | 19 | 0 | 3 | 0 | — | | — | | 22 | 0 |
| Austria Wien | 2019–20 | Austrian Bundesliga | 22 | 1 | 0 | 0 | 1 | 0 | 3 (Note: Appearances in Austrian Bundesliga European play-offs) | 0 | 26 | 1 |
| Austria Wien | 2020–21 | Austrian Bundesliga | 25 | 0 | 2 | 0 | — | | 2 | 0 | 29 | 0 |
| Austria Wien | Total | | 66 | 1 | 5 | 0 | 1 | 0 | 5 | 0 | 77 | 1 |
| Admira Wacker | 2021–22 | Austrian Bundesliga | 23 | 1 | 1 | 0 | — | | — | | 24 | 1 |
| Admira Wacker | 2022–23 | 2. Liga | 19 | 0 | 2 | 0 | — | | — | | 21 | 0 |
| Admira Wacker | 2023–24 | 2. Liga | 9 | 0 | 1 | 0 | — | | — | | 10 | 1 |
| Admira Wacker | Total | | 51 | 1 | 4 | 0 | — | | — | | 55 | 1 |
| Career total | | | 361 | 5 | 23 | 1 | 7 | 0 | 5 | 0 | 396 | 6 |
