= Peter Tschernegg =

Austrian footballer

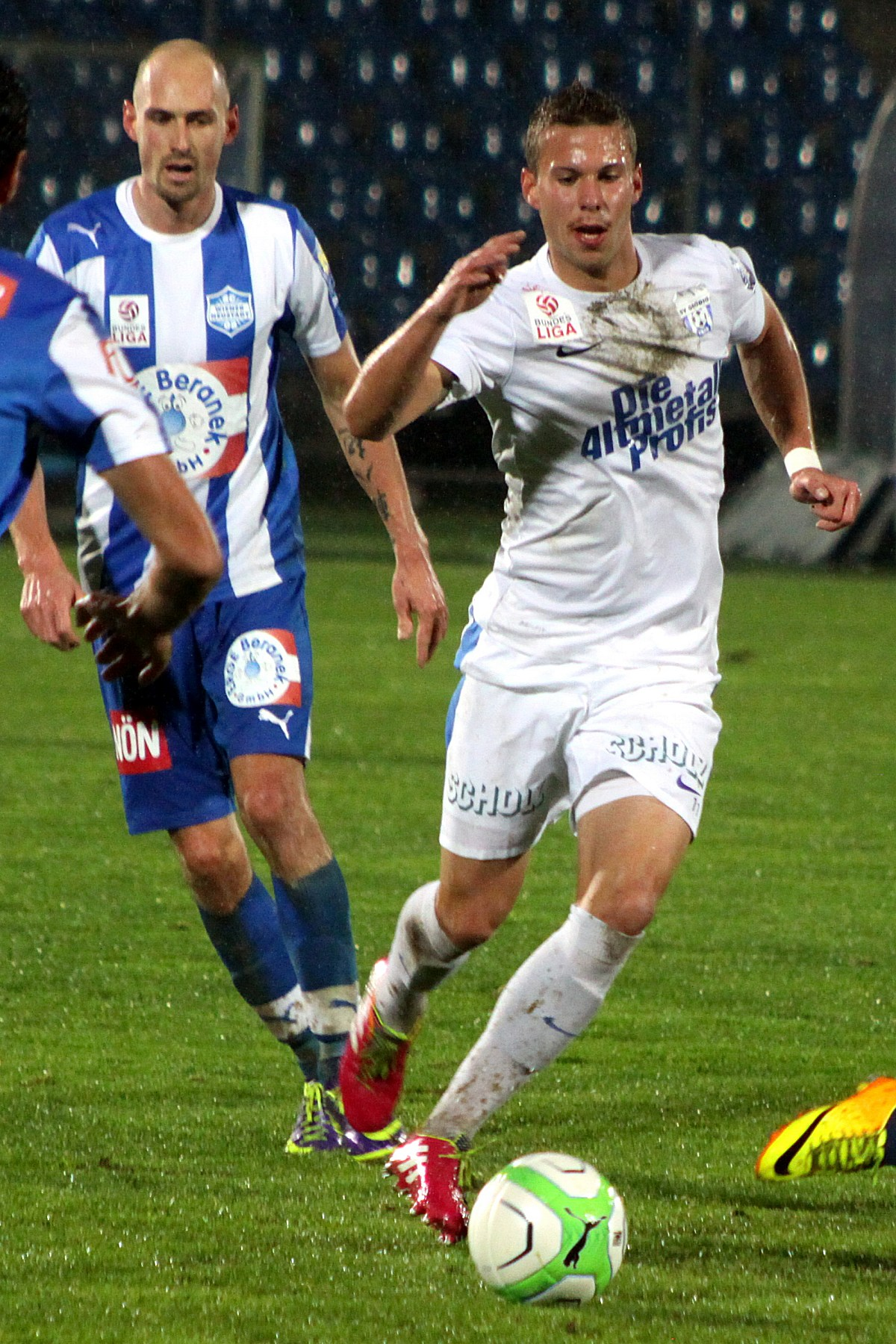
- Peter Tschernegg (in white shirt)

Personal information
- Date of birth: 23 July 1992 (age 34)
- Place of birth: Deutschlandsberg, Austria
- Height: 1.81 m (5 ft 11 in)
- Position: Midfielder

Team information
- Current team: SKU Amstetten
- Number: 23

Senior career*
Years	Team	Apps	(Gls)
2007–2010	SK Sturm Graz II	30	(2)
2011–2013	SV Grödig	78	(3)
2014–2017	Wolfsberger AC	71	(6)
2017–2019	FC St. Gallen	31	(2)
2019–2020	TSV Hartberg	14	(0)
2020–2021	Grazer AK	20	(0)
2021–	SKU Amstetten	44	(5)

International career
2007	Austria under-16	1	(0)
2008	Austria under-17	1	(0)
2013	Austria under-21	5	(0)
- * Club domestic league appearances and goals as of 20 June 2023

Peter Tschernegg (born 23 July 1992) is an Austrian professional footballer who plays as a midfielder for SKU Amstetten.

== Club career ==
In the summer of 2021 he moved to SKU Amstetten on a two-year deal.
