= Florian Neuhold =

Austrian footballer

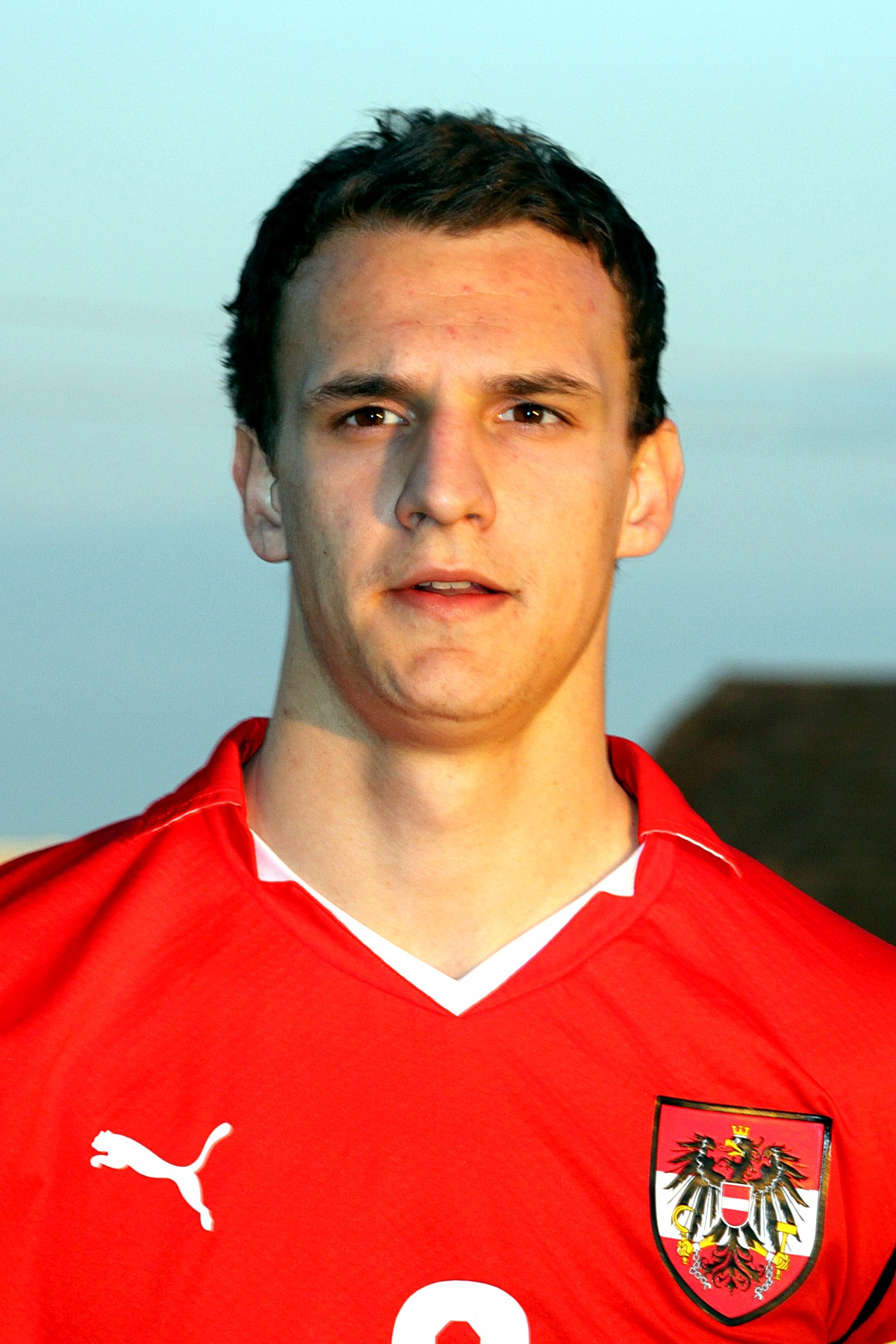
- Neuhold in March 2012.

Personal information
- Date of birth: 6 July 1993 (age 33)
- Place of birth: Weinitzen, Austria
- Height: 1.90 m (6 ft 3 in)
- Position: Centre back

Youth career
- 2004–2008: Grazer AK
- 2008–2009: Sturm Graz

Senior career*
Years	Team	Apps	(Gls)
2009–2012	Sturm Graz II	44	(2)
2011–2013	Sturm Graz	7	(0)
2013	→ Rheindorf Altach (loan)	14	(0)
2013–2014	Rheindorf Altach	23	(1)
2014–2016	LASK Linz	19	(1)
2015–2016	→ Admira Wacker (loan)	2	(0)
2016	→ Austria Klagenfurt (loan)	9	(0)
2016–2017	Eintracht Braunschweig II	26	(0)
2017–2018	Rot-Weiß Erfurt	17	(2)

International career^{‡}
2008	Austria under-16	2	(0)
2010	Austria under-17	3	(0)
2010	Austria under-18	1	(0)
2011–2012	Austria under-19	8	(0)
2013–2014	Austria under-21	11	(0)
- * Club domestic league appearances and goals as of 17 October 2018 ‡ National team caps and goals as of 7 September 2016

Florian Neuhold (born 6 July 1993) is an Austrian former footballer.

== Career ==
Neuhold joined the youth set-up of SK Sturm Graz from Grazer AK in August 2008, and having advanced through the club's youth system made his debut for the second team in a 4–0 win against ASK Voitsberg in Regional League Central on 2 October 2009. He made his first-team debut in a Champions League qualifier against FC Zestaponi of Georgia on 26 July 2011.

Neuhold made 10 further appearances in all competitions for Sturm in 2011/12, but new manager Peter Hyballa, who took over in June 2012, found Neuhold to be surplus to requirements and questioned his commitment in training. After a trial in England with Sheffield Wednesday, Neuhold joined SC Rheindorf Altach on loan in January 2013. At the end of the season, Altach took up their option to make Neuhold's move permanent.

On 30 June 2014, Neuhold left Altach to join LASK Linz before leaving the latter almost exactly a year later to join Admira Wacker on loan for the season. Admira also announced they have a right to purchase Neuhold permanently.

In September 2016, Neuhold joined the reserve side of German club Eintracht Braunschweig. In Summer 2017, he moved to Rot-Weiß Erfurt on a free transfer.

Neuhold has represented the Austria under-21s on eleven occasions, and he has also represented his country at a number of other youth levels.
