= FCM Traiskirchen =

- Founded: 2007 (as FC Möllersdorf in 1927)
- Ground: Sportzentrum Traiskirchen; Traiskirchen
- Capacity: 3,500
- Chairman: Andreas Babler
- Manager: Stefan Horniatschek
- League: Regionalliga East
- 2025–26: Regionalliga East, 7th of 17
Home colours

FCM Traiskirchen is an Austrian association football club from Traiskirchen, Lower Austria. It currently plays in the Regionalliga East, the third tier of Austrian football. Since 2022, Traiskirchen has been a reserve team for Second League side Admira Wacker.

== History ==
FCM Traiskirchen was founded in 2007 through the merger of FC Möllersdorf and Arkadia Traiskirchen, initially taking the name FCM Arkadia Traiskirchen.

In its debut season, the club competed in the sixth-tier Gebietsliga South/Southeast. By the 2011–12 season, the team won the championship of that league and earned promotion to the 2. Landesliga East. In the 2014–15 season, FCM Traiskirchen clinched the 2. Landesliga East title, finishing two points ahead of the reserve team of SC Wiener Neustadt, and was promoted to the 1. Niederösterreichische Landesliga. In 2015, the company TQS became the club's main sponsor, and the team was renamed FCM TQS Traiskirchen. In their debut season in Austria's fourth division, FCM Traiskirchen finished in eighth place, which would have typically meant missing out on promotion to the Austrian Regionalliga East. However, the club secured a place in the 2016–17 Regionalliga East by taking over the spot of 1. SC Sollenau, which had merged with Traiskirchen due to financial difficulties. As a result, Traiskirchen was promoted, while Sollenau's reserve team took a place in the 1. Klasse South, the seventh tier of Austrian football. This arrangement allowed the Lower Austrian Football Association to maintain a team in the Regionalliga East, provided Sollenau avoided relegation. However, it also resulted in two teams being relegated from the Regionalliga East that season, rather than the usual one.

During the 2016–17 season, FCM Traiskirchen also participated in the Austrian Cup for the first time, where they were eliminated in the first round by SV Horn. In April 2022, it was announced that FCM Traiskirchen would merge with FC Admira Wacker Mödling II, the reserve team of FC Admira Wacker Mödling, ahead of the 2022–23 season, forming FCM Flyeralarm Traiskirchen and continuing as Admira's reserve team.

== Players ==
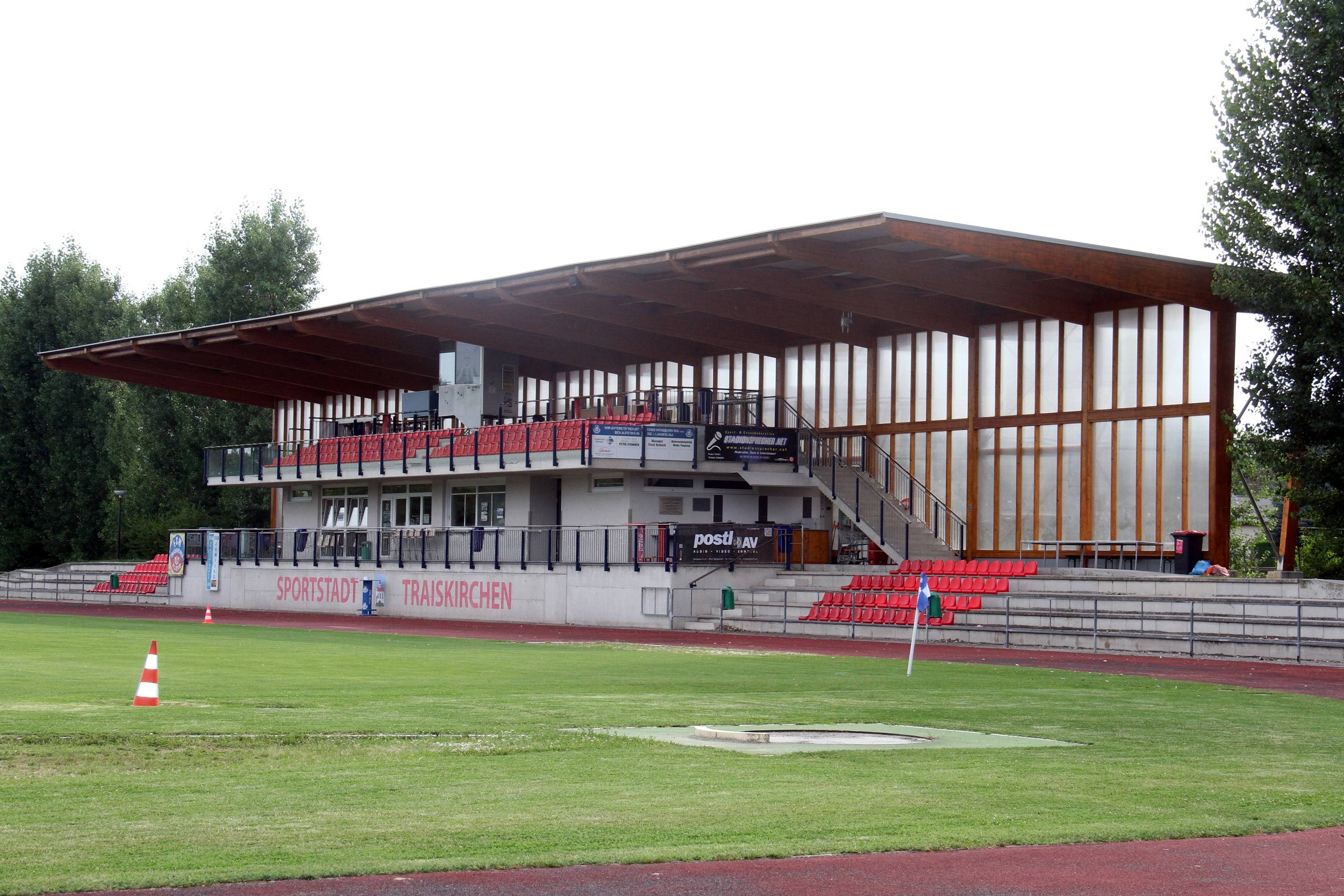
Sportzentrum Traiskirchen, the home ground of FCM Traiskirchen

=== Current squad ===
As of 13 April, 2026

Note: Flags indicate national team as defined under FIFA eligibility rules; some limited exceptions apply. Players may hold more than one non-FIFA nationality.

No.	Pos.	Nation	Player
1	GK	TUR	Fatih Bayram
4	DF	AUT	Harald Hauser
5	MF	AUT	Denis Adamov
6	DF	AUT	Raphael Schuster
7	MF	AUT	Philipp Schobesberger
8	MF	AUT	Yannick Maierhofer
9	FW	AUT	David Gallei
10	MF	AUT	Florian Fischerauer
11	FW	AUT	Marcel Röhricht
14	MF	AUT	Luca Herzog

No.	Pos.	Nation	Player
15	DF	AUT	Marvin Trost
16	MF	AUT	Maximilian Huber
20	FW	AUT	Daniel Hölbling
22	DF	AUT	Alexander Leidinger
25	MF	AUT	Thomas Ebner
27	MF	AUT	Maximilian Sax
28	FW	AUT	Isuf Ajradini
32	MF	AUT	Elias Felber
69	GK	ROU	Sebastian Bacu
69	GK	AUT	Jacob Gallei

== Club officials ==
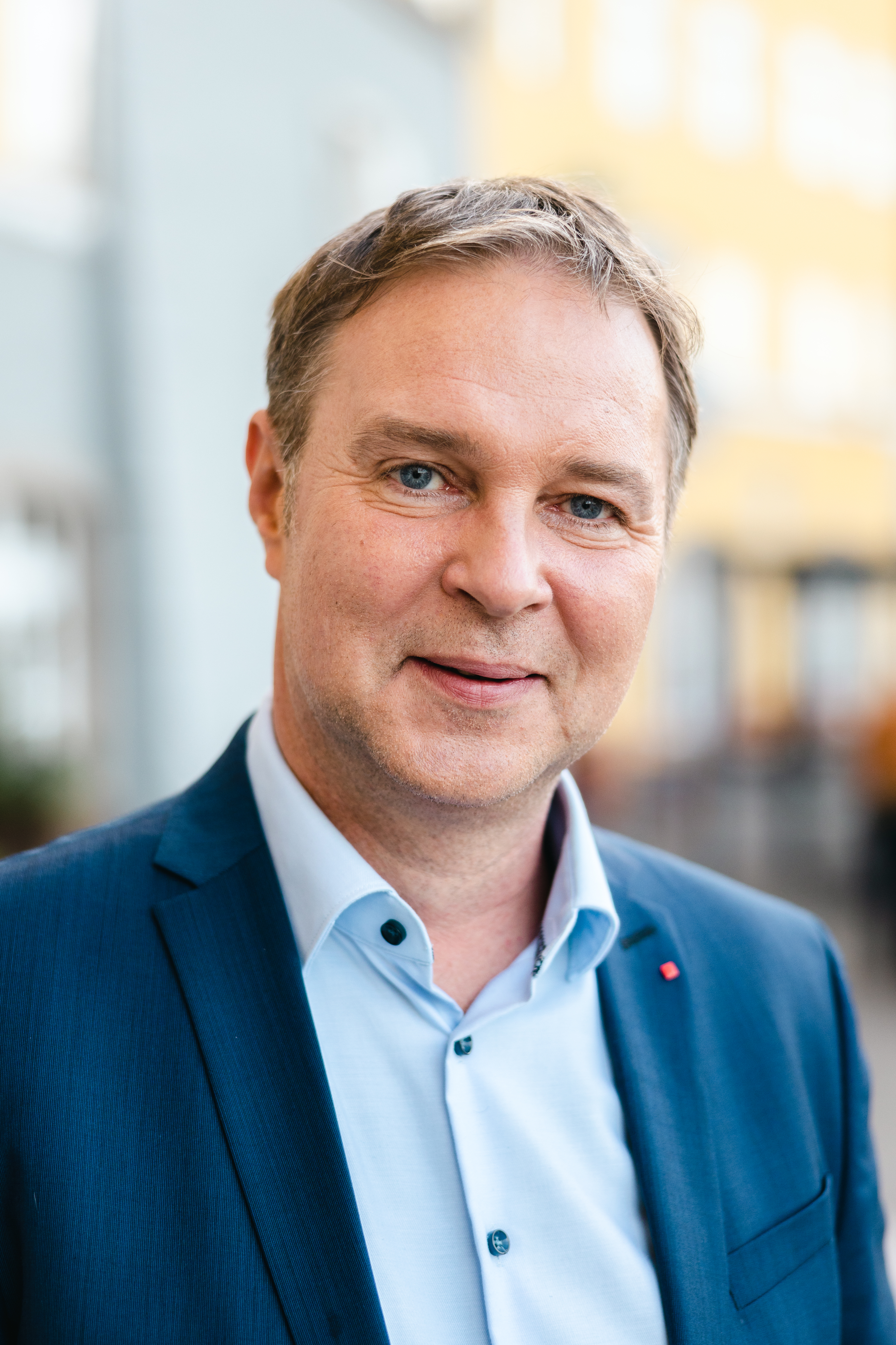
Austrian politician Andreas Babler (SPÖ) is the club's chairman.

As of October 2024

=== Management ===
Position	Name
President	Andreas Babler
Sports director	Werner Trost
Deputy chairman	Walter Stübler
Vice president	Christian Blaha, Jürgen Höfler

=== Technical staff ===
Position	Name
Head coach	Stefan Horniatschek
Goalkeeping Coach	Mario Wieneritsch
Physiotherapist	Lukas Steinbichler
Masseur	Robert Konorsa
