= Stefan Meusburger =

Austrian footballer

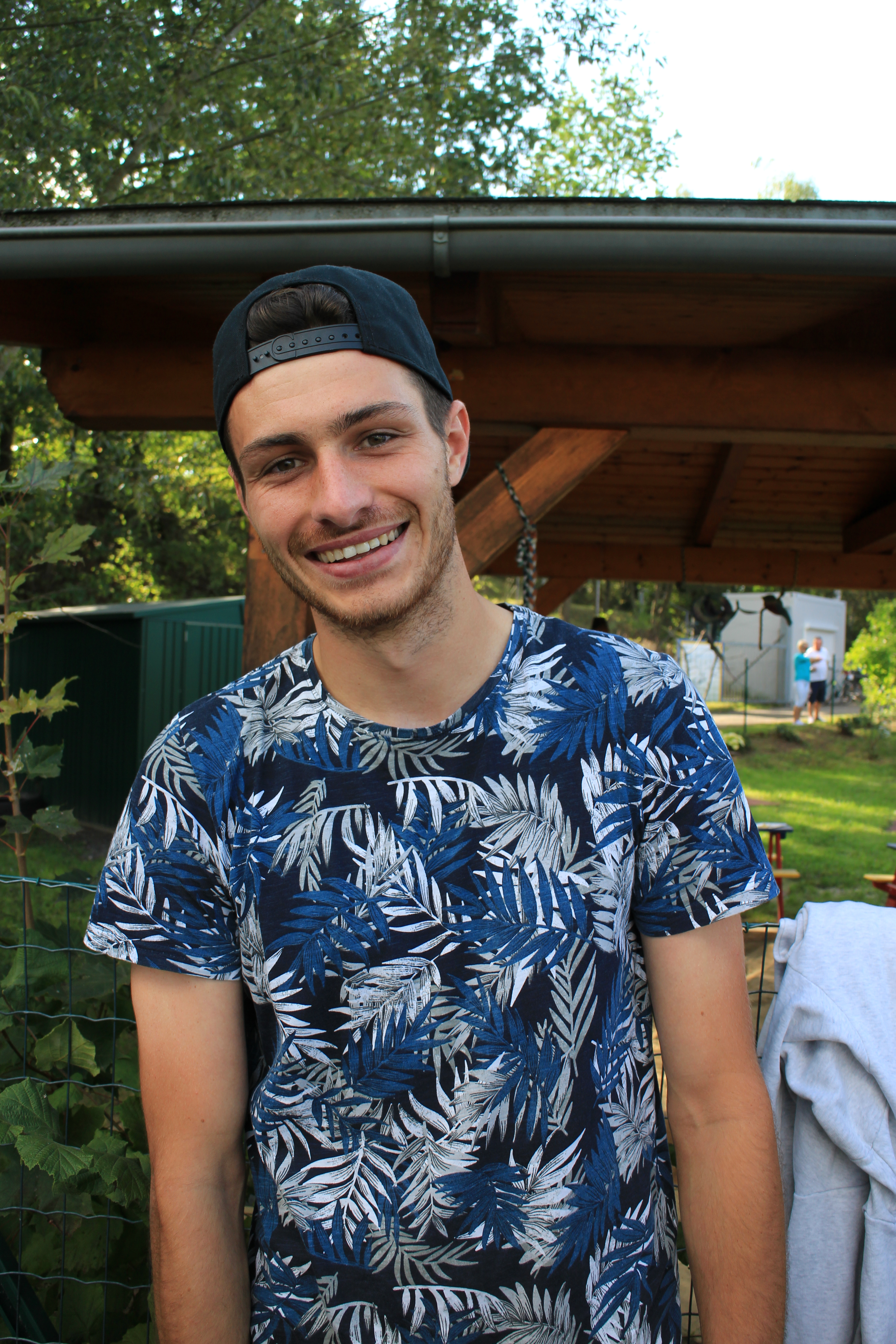

Personal information
- Date of birth: 28 October 1993 (age 33)
- Place of birth: Austria
- Height: 1.87 m (6 ft 1 1/2 in)
- Position: Defender

Team information
- Current team: FC Obdach

Youth career
- –2011: St.Margarethen-ESV Knittelfeld

Senior career*
Years	Team	Apps	(Gls)
2011–2012	ESV Knittelfeld		
2012–2014	FC Gratkorn	46	(5)
2014–2015	Kapfenberger SV II	12	(0)
2014–2017	Kapfenberger SV	66	(4)
2017–2018	TSV Hartberg	33	(8)
2018–2022	FC Wacker Innsbruck	40	(5)
2022–	FC Obdach		
- * Club domestic league appearances and goals as of 22 May 2022

Stefan Meusburger (born 28 October 1993) is an Austrian footballer who plays for an amateur side FC Obdach.
