= Markus Lackner =

Austrian footballer

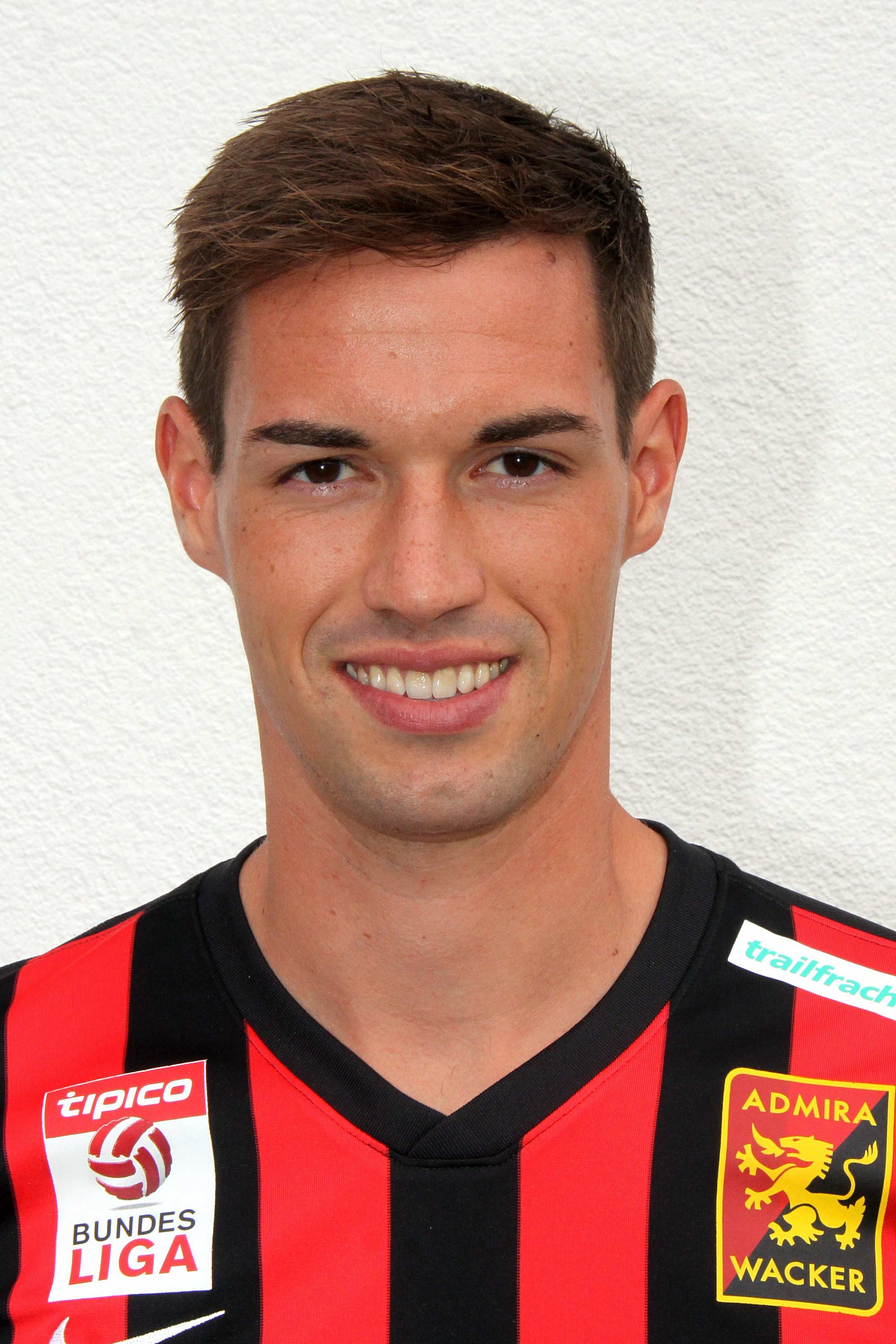
- Lackner in 2015

Personal information
- Date of birth: 5 April 1991 (age 35)
- Place of birth: Baden bei Wien, Austria
- Height: 1.93 m (6 ft 4 in)
- Position: Defensive midfielder

Team information
- Current team: FC Hertha Wels
- Number: 6

Senior career*
Years	Team	Apps	(Gls)
2009–2013	Admira Wacker II	82	(7)
2011–2018	Admira Wacker	134	(4)
2011–2012	→ First Vienna (loan)	25	(3)
2013–2014	→ SV Horn (loan)	33	(2)
2018–2020	Sturm Graz	17	(1)
2019–2020	→ Admira Wacker (loan)	27	(1)
2020–2023	SV Ried	67	(0)
2023–2024	SV Stripfing	26	(1)
2024–	FC Hertha Wels	27	(1)
- * Club domestic league appearances and goals as of 23 May 2025

Markus Lackner (born 5 April 1991) is an Austrian professional footballer who plays as a midfielder for Austrian Regionalliga club FC Hertha Wels.

== Club career ==
=== Sturm Graz ===
Lackner joined SK Sturm Graz in July 2018. On 28 August 2019 he returned to Admira Wacker on loan for the 2019–20 season.

=== SV Ried ===
On 4 September 2020 he signed with SV Ried.
