= Patrick Puchegger =

Austrian footballer (born 1995)

Personal information
- Date of birth: 4 May 1995 (age 31)
- Place of birth: Oberndorf an der Melk, Austria
- Height: 1.88 m (6 ft 2 in)
- Position: Centre-back

Team information
- Current team: Wiener Sport-Club
- Number: 15

Youth career
- 2002–2009: SV Oberndorf
- 2009–2013: AKA St. Pölten
- 2013–2014: Bayern Munich

Senior career*
Years	Team	Apps	(Gls)
2014–2017	Bayern Munich II	32	(3)
2017–2018	Sturm Graz	3	(0)
2018–2020	SKN St. Pölten	1	(0)
2019–2020	→ SKU Amstetten (loan)	41	(1)
2020–2021	SKU Amstetten	29	(0)
2021–2022	Floridsdorfer AC	27	(4)
2022–2024	Admira Wacker	40	(0)
2024–2025	Floridsdorfer AC	19	(1)
2025–	Wiener Sport-Club	0	(0)

International career
2013–2014	Austria U19	6	(2)
2015	Austria U20	3	(0)
- * Club domestic league appearances and goals as of 28 June 2026

Patrick Puchegger (born 4 May 1995) is an Austrian professional footballer who plays as a centre-back for Wiener Sport-Club

== Club career ==
He made his Austrian Football Bundesliga debut for SK Sturm Graz on 30 July 2017 in a game against FK Austria Wien.

Puchegger joined recently relegated 2. Liga club Admira Wacker on 10 June 2022, signing a two-year contract.
