= Stephan Zwierschitz =

Austrian footballer (born 1990)

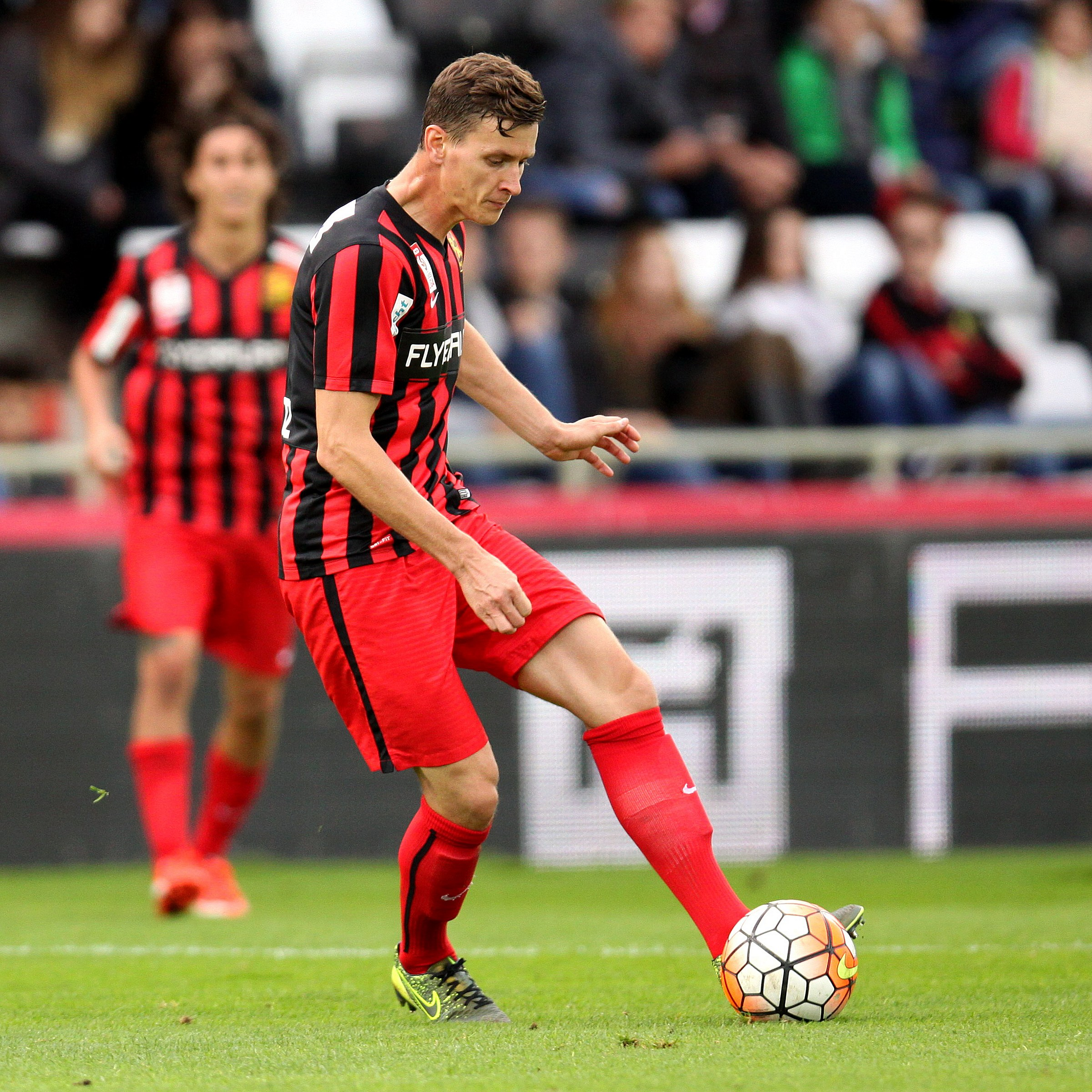

Personal information
- Date of birth: 17 September 1990 (age 36)
- Place of birth: Mödling, Austria
- Height: 1.83 m (6 ft 0 in)
- Position: Right-back

Team information
- Current team: SC Sommerein
- Number: 8

Youth career
- 1996–2002: SC Sommerein
- 2002–2003: ASK Mannersdorf
- 2003–2004: SC Sommerein
- 2004–2009: St. Pölten

Senior career*
Years	Team	Apps	(Gls)
2009–2013	St. Pölten	122	(7)
2013–2019	Admira Wacker	172	(15)
2019–2021	Austria Wien	43	(1)
2021–2024	Admira Wacker	65	(7)
2024–	SC Sommerein	5	(0)

International career
2011	Austria U21	3	(0)
- * Club domestic league appearances and goals

Stephan Zwierschitz (born 17 September 1990) is an Austrian footballer who plays as a right-back for seventh-tier 1. Klasse Ost club SC Sommerein.

== Club statistics ==
Club	Season	League		Cup		League Cup		Europe		Total	
Club	Season	Apps	Goals	Apps	Goals	Apps	Goals	Apps	Goals	Apps	Goals
St. Pölten
St. Pölten	2009–10	18	1	0	0	0	0	0	0	18	1
St. Pölten	2010–11	32	0	1	0	0	0	0	0	33	0
St. Pölten	2011–12	36	1	1	0	0	0	0	0	37	1
St. Pölten	2012–13	36	5	1	0	0	0	0	0	37	5
St. Pölten	Total	122	7	3	0	0	0	0	0	125	7
Admira Wacker
Admira Wacker	2013–14	16	1	1	1	0	0	0	0	17	2
Admira Wacker	Total	16	1	1	1	0	0	0	0	17	2
Career Total		138	8	4	1	0	0	0	0	142	9

Updated to games played as of 16 June 2014.
