= Marc Andre Schmerböck =

Austrian footballer

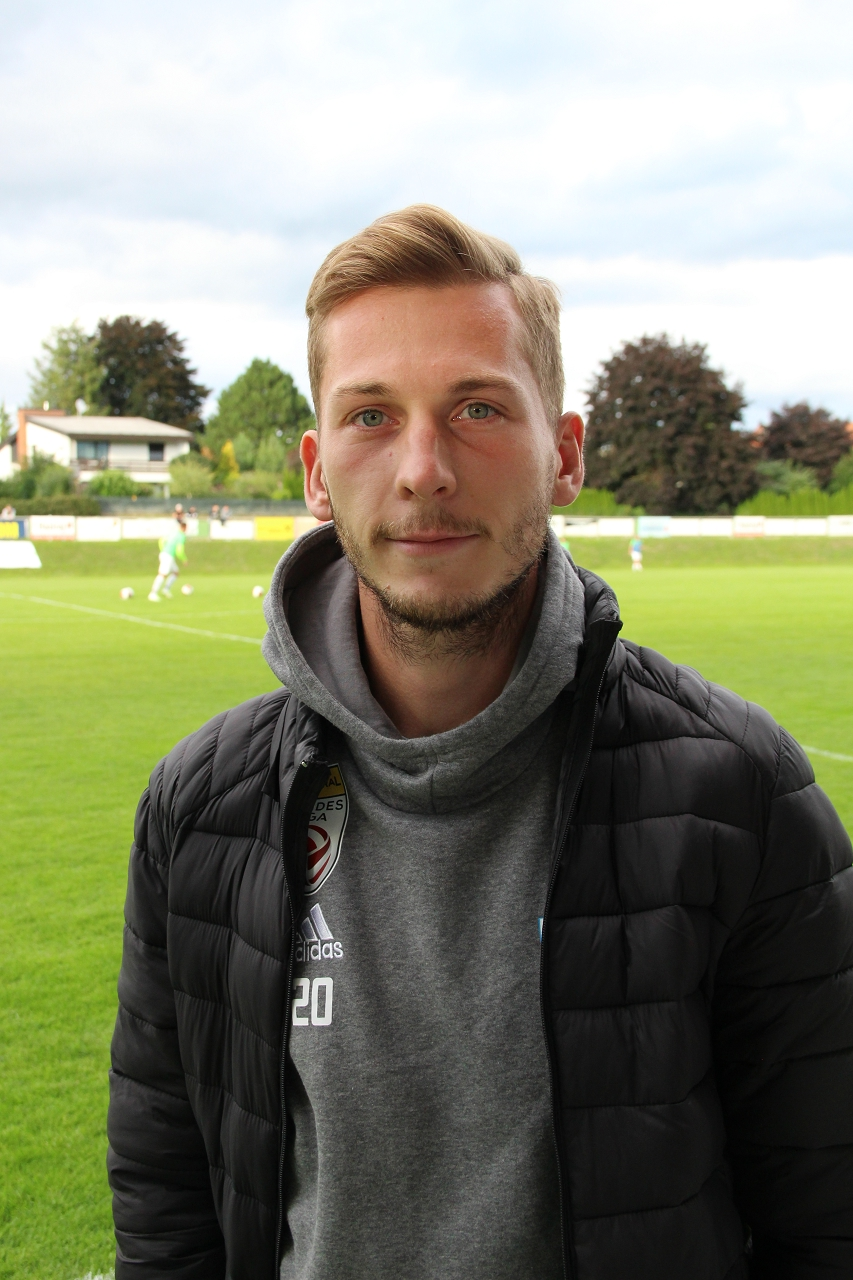
- Schmerböck in 2021

Personal information
- Date of birth: 1 April 1994 (age 32)
- Place of birth: Feldbach, Austria
- Height: 1.80 m (5 ft 11 in)
- Position: Midfielder

Team information
- Current team: Austria Klagenfurt
- Number: 11

Senior career*
Years	Team	Apps	(Gls)
2010–2015	SK Sturm Graz II	64	(7)
2012–2018	SK Sturm Graz	63	(9)
2015–2016	→ Wolfsberger AC (loan)	14	(4)
2018–2021	Wolfsberger AC	39	(8)
2021–2022	TSV Hartberg	30	(18)
2023–2024	SV Ried	19	(9)
2024	SD Logroñés	23	(12)
2025	Mohammedan	6	(1)
2025–	Austria Klagenfurt	23	(3)

International career^{‡}
2021	Austria U19	1	(0)
2016–2021	Austria	30	(7)
- * Club domestic league appearances and goals as of 17 May 2026 ‡ National team caps and goals as of 11 November 2016

Marc Andre Schmerböck (born 1 April 1994) is an Austrian professional footballer who plays as a midfielder for 2. Liga club Austria Klagenfurt.

== Club career ==
On 5 January 2021, he joined TSV Hartberg on a two-and-a-half-year contract.

On 31 January 2024, Schmerböck signed with SD Logroñés in the Spanish third-tier Primera Federación.
