= Maximilian Sax =

Austrian footballer (born 1992)

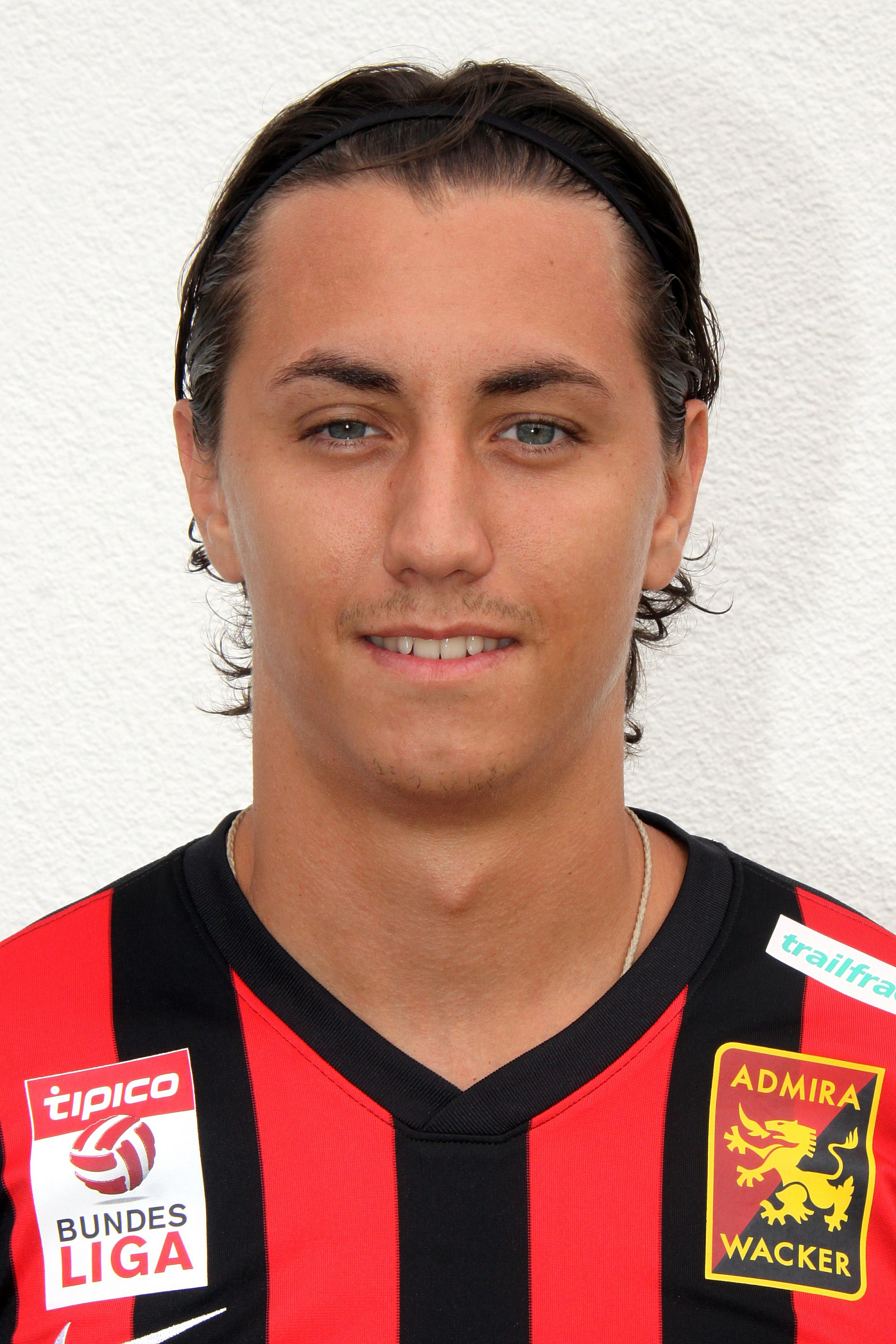
- Sax with Admira Wacker in July 2015

Personal information
- Date of birth: 22 November 1992 (age 33)
- Place of birth: Baden bei Wien, Austria
- Height: 1.78 m (5 ft 10 in)
- Position: Forward

Team information
- Current team: FCM Traiskirchen
- Number: 27

Senior career*
Years	Team	Apps	(Gls)
2010–2018	Admira Wacker II	55	(21)
2010–2018	Admira Wacker	115	(11)
2018–2021	Austria Wien	48	(4)
2018–2022	Austria Wien II	9	(1)
2021	→ Admira Wacker (loan)	4	(0)
2023–2026	Wiener Neustadt	72	(34)
2026–	FCM Traiskirchen	14	(7)
- * Club domestic league appearances and goals as of 28 June 2026

Maximilian Sax (born 22 November 1992) is an Austrian professional footballer who plays as a forward for FCM Traiskirchen.

== International career ==
Sax got his first call up to the senior Austria side after Marcel Sabitzer withdrew through injury for 2018 FIFA World Cup qualifiers against Wales and Georgia in September 2017.
