= Michael Novak (footballer) =

Austrian footballer

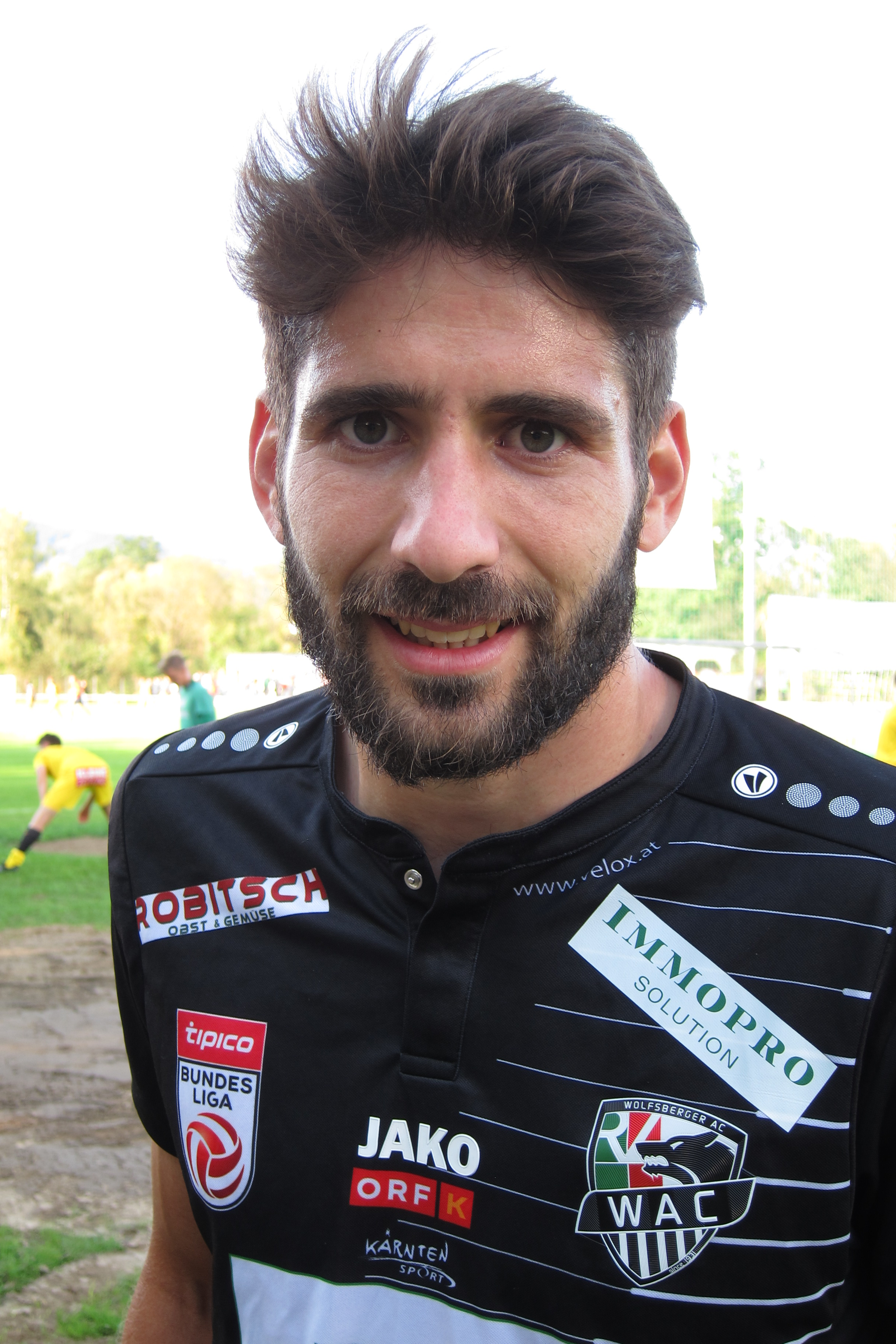

Personal information
- Date of birth: 30 December 1990 (age 35)
- Place of birth: Sankt Veit an der Glan, Austria
- Height: 1.84 m (6 ft 0 in)
- Position: Defender

Team information
- Current team: SK Treibach
- Number: 27

Senior career*
Years	Team	Apps	(Gls)
2008–2010	FC St. Veit	51	(7)
2010–2013	Austria Wien II	35	(2)
2013–2018	SV Mattersburg	124	(2)
2018–2024	Wolfsberger AC	130	(6)
2023–2024	Wolfsberger AC II	19	(3)
2024–	SK Treibach	9	(1)
- * Club domestic league appearances and goals as of 27 September 2024

Michael Novak (born 30 December 1990) is an Austrian professional footballer who plays for Austrian Regionalliga club SK Treibach.
