= 2015–16 FC Red Bull Salzburg season =

Red Bull Salzburg
2015–16 season
- Sporting Director: Jochen Sauer
- Manager: Peter Zeidler (until 3 December); Thomas Letsch (3–28 December); Óscar García (from 28 December)
- Stadium: Red Bull Arena
- Bundesliga: 1st
- Austrian Cup: Winners
- UEFA Champions League: Third qualifying round (vs. Malmö FF)
- UEFA Europa League: Play-off round (vs. Dinamo Minsk)
- Top goalscorer: League: Jonathan Soriano (21); All: Jonathan Soriano (32)
Home colours	Away colours	Third colours

The 2015–16 FC Red Bull Salzburg season was the 83rd season in club history. Red Bull Salzburg finished the season as champions of the Bundesliga and the Austrian Cup for the third season in a row. In Europe, Salzburg were knocked out of the Champions League by Malmö FF in the third qualifying round, dropping into the Europa League, where they were eliminated by Dinamo Minsk in the play-off round.

== Season events ==
=== Bundesliga ===
On matchday one, on 25 July, Red Bull lost 2–1 to Mattersburg. Markus Pink and Alexander Ibser scored for Mattersburg and Naby Keïta scored for Red Bull. Red Bull finished the matchday tied for seventh place. Red Bull lost 2–1 to Rapid Wien on Matchday two, on 1 August. Athanasios Petsos and Stefan Schwab scored for Rapid Wien and Dimitri Oberlin scored for Red Bull. Red Bull finished the matchday in ninth place. On matchday three, on 8 August, Red Bull and Admira Wacker finished in a 2–2 draw. Yordy Reyna and Naby Keïta scored for Red Bull and Dominik Starkl and Markus Lackner scored for Admira Wacker. Red Bull finished the matchday in seventh place.

=== Austrian Cup ===
Red Bull opened up their season on 18 July with three goals each from Jonathan Soriano and Marco Djuricin and a goal from Takumi Minamino.

=== Champions League ===
Red Bull entered the competition in the third qualifying round. They were drawn against the winner of the fixture between Malmö and Žalgiris. Malmö advanced to face Red Bull. The first leg took place on 29 July. Red Bull won 2–0 with goals from Andreas Ulmer and Martin Hinteregger. Hinteregger scored from the penalty spot. The second leg was played on 5 August. Red Bull lost 3–0 to get knocked out 3–2 on aggregate. Nikola Đurđić, Markus Rosenberg, and Vladimir Rodić scored for Malmö.

=== Europa League ===
Red Bull were knocked out of Champions League by Malmö and entered the Europa League playoff round. Red Bull were drawn against Dinamo Minsk. The first leg was played on 20 August. Dinamo Minsk won the match 2–0 with goals from Gleb Rassadkin and Nenad Adamović.

== Squad ==
As of match played 19 May 2016

No.	Name	Nationality	Position	Date of birth (age)	Signed from	Signed in	Contract ends	Apps.	Goals
Goalkeepers
1	Cican Stankovic	(Austria) (Note: Cican Stankovic was born in Bijeljina, Bosnia and Herzegovina, but qualified to represent Austria internationally, representing the Austrian U-21 team in 2014.)	GK	4 November 1992 (aged 23)	SV Grödig	2015	2020	9	0
31	Airton	(Brazil)	GK	29 May 1994 (aged 21)	Juventude	2015	2020	0	0
33	Alexander Walke	(Germany)	GK	6 June 1983 (aged 32)	Hansa Rostock	2010	2017		
34	Lawrence Ati-Zigi	(Ghana)	GK	29 November 1996 (aged 19)	Red Bull Ghana	2015		0	0
Defenders
2	Benno Schmitz	(Germany)	DF	17 November 1994 (aged 21)	Bayern Munich II	2014		60	0
3	Paulo Miranda	(Brazil)	DF	16 August 1988 (aged 27)	São Paulo	2015	2019	38	2
4	Dayot Upamecano	(France)	DF	27 October 1998 (aged 17)	Valenciennes	2015	2018	2	0
5	Duje Ćaleta-Car	(Croatia)	DF	17 September 1996 (aged 19)	Pasching	2014	2020	46	2
6	Christian Schwegler	(Switzerland)	DF	6 June 1984 (aged 31)	Young Boys	2009			
17	Andreas Ulmer	(Austria)	DF	30 October 1985 (aged 30)	SV Ried	2009			
22	Stefan Lainer	(Austria)	DF	27 August 1992 (aged 23)	SV Ried	2015	2018	28	2
28	Asger Sørensen	(Denmark)	DF	5 June 1996 (aged 19)	Academy	2014		5	0
95	Bernardo	(Brazil)	DF	14 May 1995 (aged 21)	Red Bull Brasil	2016	2020	16	0
Midfielders
7	Reinhold Yabo	(Germany)	MF	10 February 1992 (aged 24)	Karlsruher SC	2015	2018	0	0
8	Naby Keïta	(Guinea)	MF	10 February 1995 (aged 21)	Istres	2014	2019	81	20
10	Valentino Lazaro	(Austria)	MF	24 March 1996 (aged 20)	Academy	2012		72	8
14	Valon Berisha	(Norway) (Note: Valon Berisha was born in Malmö, Sweden to Kosovo Albanian parents. Berisha qualified to represent Norway internationally, representing them at various levels until September 2016, when he switched to representing Kosovo.)	MF	7 February 1993 (aged 23)	Viking	2012		142	24
23	Hany Mukhtar	(Germany)	MF	21 March 1995 (aged 21)	loan from Benfica	2015	2016	15	1
24	Christoph Leitgeb	(Austria)	MF	14 April 1985 (aged 31)	Sturm Graz	2007			
27	Konrad Laimer	(Austria)	MF	27 May 1997 (aged 18)	Academy	2014		29	4
47	Xaver Schlager	(Austria)	MF	28 September 1997 (aged 18)	Academy	2015		2	0
55	Yasin Pehlivan	(Austria)	MF	5 January 1989 (aged 27)	Kayseri Erciyesspor	2015	2016(+2)	17	0
88	Diadie Samassékou	(Mali)	MF	11 January 1996 (aged 20)	Real Bamako	2015	2019	0	0
Forwards
15	Yordy Reyna	(Peru)	FW	17 September 1993 (aged 22)	Alianza Lima	2013	2017	31	3
16	Omer Damari	(Israel)	FW	24 March 1989 (aged 27)	loan from RB Leipzig	2015	2016	16	4
18	Takumi Minamino	(Japan)	FW	16 January 1995 (aged 21)	Cerezo Osaka	2015	2018	57	16
20	David Atanga	(Ghana)	FW	25 December 1996 (aged 19)	Red Bull Ghana	2015	2020	10	0
26	Jonathan Soriano	(Spain)	FW	24 September 1985 (aged 30)	Barcelona B	2012		179	158
37	Dimitri Oberlin	(Switzerland) (Note: Dimitri Oberlin was born in Yaoundé, Cameroon but qualified to represent Switzerland internationally, representing them at various youth levels before making his senior debut in 2018.)	FW	27 September 1997 (aged 18)	Zürich	2015	2020	15	3
46	Smail Prevljak	(Bosnia and Herzegovina)	FW	10 May 1995 (aged 21)	loan from RB Leipzig	2015		11	0
48	Hwang Hee-chan	(South Korea)	FW	26 January 1996 (aged 20)	Pohang Steelers	2015		14	0
Out on loan
9	Marco Djuricin	(Austria)	FW	12 December 1992 (aged 23)	Sturm Graz	2015		21	6
21	Taxiarchis Fountas	(Greece)	FW	4 September 1995 (aged 20)	AEK Athens	2013		1	0
36	Martin Hinteregger	(Austria)	DF	7 September 1992 (aged 23)	Academy	2010			
44	Ante Roguljić	(Croatia)	MF	11 March 1996 (aged 20)	Academy	2014		2	1
	Peter Ankersen	(Denmark)	DF	22 September 1990 (aged 25)	Esbjerg	2014		33	1
13	Michael Brandner	(Austria)	MF	13 February 1995 (aged 21)	Academy	2013		0	0
Left during the season
11	Felipe Pires	(Brazil)	FW	18 April 1995 (aged 21)	Academy	2014		15	2
19	Håvard Nielsen	(Norway)	FW	15 July 1993 (aged 22)	Vålerenga	2012		57	5

=== Out on loan ===
Note: Flags indicate national team as defined under FIFA eligibility rules; some limited exceptions apply. Players may hold more than one non-FIFA nationality.

No.	Pos.	Nation	Player
9	FW	AUT	Marco Djuricin (at Brentford)
13	MF	AUT	Michael Brandner (at SV Ried)
21	FW	GRE	Taxiarchis Fountas (at Asteras Tripolis)

No.	Pos.	Nation	Player
36	DF	AUT	Martin Hinteregger (at Borussia Mönchengladbach)
44	MF	CRO	Ante Roguljić (at Hajduk Split)
—	DF	DEN	Peter Ankersen (at Copenhagen)

=== Left during the season ===
Note: Flags indicate national team as defined under FIFA eligibility rules; some limited exceptions apply. Players may hold more than one non-FIFA nationality.

No. / Pos. / Nation / Player; 11 / FW / BRA / Felipe Pires (to TSG 1899 Hoffenheim)	No. / Pos. / Nation / Player; 16 / FW / NOR / Håvard Nielsen (to SC Freiburg)

== Transfers ==
=== In ===
Date	Position	Nationality	Name	From	Fee	Ref.
1 July 2015	GK	(Austria)	Cican Stankovic	SV Grödig	Undisclosed	
1 July 2015	GK	(Brazil)	Airton	Juventude	Undisclosed	
1 July 2015	DF	(Austria)	Stefan Lainer	SV Ried	Undisclosed	
1 July 2015	DF	(Brazil)	Paulo Miranda	São Paulo	Undisclosed	
1 July 2015	MF	(Germany)	Reinhold Yabo	Karlsruher SC	Free	
1 July 2015	MF	(Japan)	Masaya Okugawa	Kyoto Sanga	Undisclosed	
1 July 2015	FW	(Bosnia and Herzegovina)	Smail Prevljak	RB Leipzig	Undisclosed	
1 July 2015	FW	(Switzerland)	Dimitri Oberlin	Zürich	Undisclosed	
11 July 2015	DF	(France)	Dayot Upamecano	Valenciennes	Undisclosed	
17 August 2015	MF	(Mali)	Diadie Samassékou	Real Bamako	Free	
22 August 2015	MF	(Austria)	Yasin Pehlivan	Kayseri Erciyesspor	Free	
1 January 2016	DF	(Brazil)	Bernardo	Red Bull Brasil	Undisclosed	

=== Loans in ===
Start date	Position	Nationality	Name	From	End date	Ref.
1 July 2015	FW	(Israel)	Omer Damari	RB Leipzig	End of Season	
28 August 2015	MF	(Germany)	Hany Mukhtar	Benfica	End of Season	

=== Out ===
Date	Position	Nationality	Name	To	Fee	Ref.
1 July 2015	GK	(Hungary)	Péter Gulácsi	RB Leipzig	Undisclosed	
1 July 2015	MF	(Germany)	Stefan Ilsanker	RB Leipzig	Undisclosed	
1 July 2015	FW	(Germany)	Nils Quaschner	RB Leipzig	Undisclosed	
25 August 2015	FW	(Brazil)	Felipe Pires	TSG 1899 Hoffenheim	Undisclosed	
1 January 2016	FW	(Norway)	Håvard Nielsen	SC Freiburg	Undisclosed	

=== Loans out ===
Start date	Position	Nationality	Name	To	End date	Ref.
1 July 2015	DF	(Denmark)	Peter Ankersen	Copenhagen	End of Season	
1 July 2015	MF	(Croatia)	Ante Roguljić	Hajduk Split	End of Season	
1 July 2015	FW	(Greece)	Taxiarchis Fountas	Asteras Tripolis	End of Season	
31 August 2015	FW	(Austria)	Marco Djuricin	Brentford	End of Season	
1 January 2016	MF	(Austria)	Michael Brandner	SV Ried	End of 2016/17 Season	
8 January 2016	FW	(Austria)	Martin Hinteregger	Borussia Mönchengladbach	End of Season	

=== Released ===
Date	Position	Nationality	Name	Joined	Date	Ref.
30 June 2016	MF	(Austria)	Yasin Pehlivan	Spartak Trnava		

== Friendlies ==
3 July 2015	Red Bull Salzburg	0 – 1	Kapfenberger SV	Wals-Siezenheim
19:00 CEST (UTC+2)		Report	Imbongo 8'	Stadium: Red Bull Arena

8 July 2015	Red Bull Salzburg	3 – 1	West Bromwich Albion	Schladming, Austria
18:00 CEST (UTC+2)	Djuricin 33'; Soriano 39'; Minamino 65'	Report	Nabi 67'	Stadium: Athletic Area

11 July 2015	Red Bull Salzburg	0 – 4	Werder Bremen	Wals-Siezenheim
16:00 CEST (UTC+2)		Report	Bargfrede 16'; Ujah 22'; Garcia 27' di Santo 45'	Stadium: Red Bull Arena

11 July 2015	Red Bull Salzburg	2 – 0	Southampton	Wals-Siezenheim
18:10 CEST (UTC+2)	Nielson 19'; Oberlin 23'	Report		Stadium: Red Bull Arena

21 July 2015	Red Bull Salzburg	1 – 1	Werder Bremen	Wals-Siezenheim
19:00 CEST (UTC+2)	Atanga 19'	Report	Mehmedi 74'	Stadium: Red Bull Arena; Attendance: 11,427; Referee: Sebastian Gishamer

8 October 2015	Greuther Fürth	1 – 1	Red Bull Salzburg	Munich, Germany
16:00 CEST (UTC+2)	Gjasula 50'	Report	Soriano 39' (pen.)	Stadium: Sportpark Heimstetten; Referee: Christian Diez

16 January 2016	Red Bull Salzburg	2 – 1	LASK	Wals-Siezenheim
13:00 CET (UTC+1)	Prevljak 10'; Berisha 47'	Report	Dovedan 5'	Stadium: Red Bull Fussball- & Eishockey-Akademie; Attendance: 300

23 January 2016	Red Bull Salzburg	0 – 1	FSV Frankfurt	Wals-Siezenheim
15:30 CET (UTC+1)		Report	Dedić 37'	Stadium: Trainingszentrum

29 January 2016	Red Bull Salzburg	0 – 1	Mladá Boleslav	Wals-Siezenheim
17:00 CET (UTC+1)		Report	Skalák 78'; Šćuk (red card) 89'	Stadium: Red Bull Fussball- & Eishockey-Akademie; Attendance: 400

30 January 2016	Red Bull Salzburg	1 – 1	SV Sandhausen	Wals-Siezenheim
14:00 CET (UTC+1)	Atanga 34'	Report	Roßbach 32'	Stadium: Red Bull Fussball- & Eishockey-Akademie; Attendance: 400

== Competitions ==
=== Overview ===
Competition	First match	Last match	Starting round	Final position	Record							
Competition	First match	Last match	Starting round	Final position	Pld	W	D	L	GF	GA	GD	Win %
Bundesliga	25 July 2015	15 May 2016	Matchday 1	Winners	36	21	11	4	71	33	+38	58.33
Austrian Cup	18 July 2015	19 May 2016	First round	Winners	6	6	0	0	25	6	+19	100.00
Champions League	29 July 2015	5 August 2015	Third Qualifying round	Third Qualifying round	2	1	0	1	2	3	−1	50.00
Europa League	20 August 2015	27 August 2015	Playoff Round	Playoff Round	2	1	0	1	2	2	+0	50.00
Total					46	29	11	6	100	44	+56	63.04

Last updated: 15 May 2016
Source: Soccerway

=== Bundesliga ===
==== League table ====
Pos	Team	Pld	W	D	L	GF	GA	GD	Pts	Qualification or relegation
1	Red Bull Salzburg (C)	36	21	11	4	71	33	+38	74	Qualification for the Champions League second qualifying round
2	Rapid Wien	36	20	5	11	66	42	+24	65	Qualification for the Europa League third qualifying round
3	Austria Wien	36	17	8	11	65	48	+17	59	Qualification for the Europa League second qualifying round
4	Admira Wacker Mödling	36	13	11	12	45	51	−6	50	Qualification for the Europa League first qualifying round
5	Sturm Graz	36	12	12	12	40	40	0	48	

Source: weltfussball.de (in German), Soccerway
Rules for classification: 1) Points; 2) Less matches awarded against; 3) Goal difference; 4) Goals scored; 5) Matches won; 6) Away matches won; 7) Head-to-head points; 8) Head-to-head goal difference; 9) Head-to-head goals scored.
(C) Champions

==== Results summary ====
Overall								Home						Away					
Pld	W	D	L	GF	GA	GD	Pts	W	D	L	GF	GA	GD	W	D	L	GF	GA	GD
36	21	11	4	71	33	+38	74	14	3	1	45	15	+30	7	8	3	26	18	+8

==== Results by round ====
Round	1	2	3	4	5	6	7	8	9	10	11	12	13	14	15	16	17	18	19	20	21	22	23	24	25	26	27	28	29	30	31	32	33	34	35	36
Ground	A	H	A	A	H	H	A	H	A	H	A	H	H	A	A	H	A	H	A	H	A	A	H	H	A	H	A	H	A	H	H	A	A	H	A	H
Result	L	L	D	W	W	D	W	W	D	W	W	W	W	L	D	W	D	D	D	W	W	L	W	W	D	W	D	W	D	W	W	W	W	D	W	W

Updated to match(es) played on 15 May 2016. Source: See Results
A = Away; H = Home; W = Win; D = Draw; L = Loss

==== Results ====
25 July 2015 1	SV Mattersburg	2 – 1	Red Bull Salzburg	Mattersburg
16:00 CEST (UTC+2)	Pink 1'; Sprangler (yellow card) 54'; Ibser 90+3'	Report	Keïta 83'; Schmitz (yellow card) 87'	Stadium: Pappelstadion; Attendance: 8,500; Referee: Harald Lechner

1 August 2015 2	Red Bull Salzburg	1 – 2	Rapid Wien	Wals-Siezenheim
16:00 CEST (UTC+2)	Schmitz (yellow card) 19'; Atanga (yellow card) 34'; Pires (yellow card) 45'; Oberlin 66'	Report	Petsos 15'; Schwab 33'; Schaub (yellow card) 76'; Kainz (yellow card) 83'	Stadium: Red Bull Arena; Attendance: 17,500; Referee: Robert Schörgenhofer

8 August 2015 3	Admira Wacker	2 – 2	Red Bull Salzburg	Maria Enzersdorf
18:30 CEST (UTC+2)	Starkl 17' (yellow card) 60'; Lackner 32'; Ebner (yellow card) 74'; Wessely (yellow card) 90+4'	Report	Reyna 7'; Keïta 34'	Stadium: BSFZ-Arena; Attendance: 2,900; Referee: Andreas Heiß

11 August 2015 4	SV Ried	1 – 4	Red Bull Salzburg	Ried im Innkreis
18:30 CEST (UTC+2)	Ziegl (yellow card) 60'; Schubert 89'	Report	Minamino 10' 38'; Damari 26', 43'; Lainer (yellow card) 40'	Stadium: Keine Sorgen Arena; Attendance: 4,720; Referee: Andreas Kollegger

15 August 2015 5	Red Bull Salzburg	2 – 0	Rheindorf Altach	Wals-Siezenheim
18:30 CEST (UTC+2)	Damari 5'; Atanga (yellow card) 66'; Keïta 90'	Report	Luxbacher (yellow card) 26'; Harrer (yellow card) 30'; Jäger (yellow card) 51'; César Ortiz (yellow card) 73'; Prokopič (yellow card) 76'	Stadium: Red Bull Arena; Attendance: 7,539; Referee: Harald Lechner

23 August 2015 6	Red Bull Salzburg	2 – 2	Austria Wien	Wals-Siezenheim
16:30 CEST (UTC+2)	Prevljak 25'; Ulmer (yellow card) 58'; Lainer 75'	Report	Grünwald 17'; Šikov (yellow card) 44'; Kayode 48'; Rotpuller (yellow card) 69' (yellow-red card) 72'; Meilinger (yellow card) 73'; Koch (yellow card) 90+4'; Holzhauser (yellow card) 90+4'	Stadium: Red Bull Arena; Attendance: 9,292; Referee: Robert Schörgenhofer

30 August 2015 7	Sturm Graz	2 – 3	Red Bull Salzburg	Graz
16:30 CEST (UTC+2)	Madl (yellow card) 42'; Hadžić 70'; Tadić 88'	Report	Spendlhofer 3' (o.g.); Schwegler (yellow card) 20'; Reyna 53'; Lainer (yellow card) 56'; Minamino 66'	Stadium: UPC Arena; Attendance: 11,100; Referee: Markus Hameter

12 September 2015 8	Red Bull Salzburg	4 – 2	SV Grödig	Wals-Siezenheim
18:30 CEST (UTC+2)	Minamino 34', 71'; Berisha (yellow card) 39'; Keïta 51'; Soriano 74'	Report	Venuto 19'; Ulmer 26' (o.g.); Maak (red card) 74'	Stadium: Red Bull Arena; Attendance: 8,365; Referee: Oliver Drachta

19 September 2015 9	Wolfsberger AC	1 – 1	Red Bull Salzburg	Klagenfurt
18:30 CEST (UTC+2)	Berisha (yellow card) 13'; Soriano 47'; Ulmer (yellow card) 86'	Report	Ouédraogo 39'; Palla (yellow card) 43'; Berger (yellow card) 72'	Stadium: Wörthersee Stadion; Attendance: 3,850; Referee: Harald Lechner

26 September 2015 10	Red Bull Salzburg	2 – 4	SV Mattersburg	Wals-Siezenheim
18:30 CEST (UTC+2)	Keïta (yellow card) 2'; Soriano 5', 51', 67', 85' (pen.)	Report	Farkas 21'; Jano 25'	Stadium: Red Bull Arena; Attendance: 6,271; Referee: Alexander Harkam

4 October 2015 11	Rapid Wien	1 – 2	Red Bull Salzburg	Vienna
16:30 CEST (UTC+2)	Stangl 17'; Hofmann (yellow card) 62'; Auer (yellow card) 90'; Jelić (yellow card) 90'	Report	Minamino 43'; Schwegler 64' (yellow card) 89'; Soriano (yellow card) 90+1'; Reyna (yellow card) 90+4'	Stadium: Ernst-Happel-Stadion; Attendance: 23,200; Referee: Dominik Ouschan

17 October 2015 12	Red Bull Salzburg	8 – 0	Admira Wacker	Wals-Siezenheim
16:00 CEST (UTC+2)	Soriano 31', 53'; Ćaleta-Car (yellow card) 44'; Berisha 44', 70'; Keïta 56'; Minamino 64'; Damari 75'; Mukhtar 86'	Report	Ebner (yellow card) 17'; Schicker (yellow card) 73'	Stadium: Red Bull Arena; Attendance: 7,715; Referee: Dieter Muckenhammer

24 October 2015 13	Red Bull Salzburg	2 – 1	SV Ried	Wals-Siezenheim
18:30 CEST (UTC+2)	Soriano 8'; Keïta 32'; Miranda (yellow card) 67'	Report	Polverino (yellow card) 14'; Trauner (yellow card) 17'; Möschl 27'; Elsneg (yellow card) 60'; Gavilán (yellow card) 81'	Stadium: Red Bull Arena; Attendance: 10,581; Referee: Andreas Kollegger

31 October 2015 14	Rheindorf Altach	1 – 0	Red Bull Salzburg	Altach
18:30 CET (UTC+1)	Netzer (yellow card) 56'; Roth 64'; Schreiner (yellow card) 78'; Seeger (yellow card) 90+3'	Report	Keïta (yellow card) 56'; Hinteregger (yellow card) 63'; Schwegler (yellow card) 64'	Stadium: Stadion Schnabelholz; Attendance: 5,372; Referee: Julian Weinberger

7 November 2015 15	Austria Wien	1 – 1	Red Bull Salzburg	Vienna
16:00 CEST (UTC+2)	Holzhauser (yellow card) 37'; Zulechner (yellow card) 53' de Paula (yellow card) 63'; Friesenbichler 80'; Kahat (yellow card) 87'	Report	Miranda 24' (yellow card) 38'; Lainer (yellow card) 84'	Stadium: Generali Arena; Attendance: 11,858; Referee: Robert Schörgenhofer

22 November 2015 16	Red Bull Salzburg	3 – 1	Sturm Graz	Wals-Siezenheim
16:30 CEST (UTC+2)	Soriano 21', 90+3'; Hinteregger (yellow card) 28'; Schmitz (yellow card) 69'; Damari (yellow card) 76'; Keïta 87'	Report	Esser (yellow card) 21'; Kamavuaka (yellow card) 52'; Lykogiannis 77'	Stadium: Red Bull Arena; Attendance: 9,623; Referee: Alain Bieri

28 November 2015 17	SV Grödig	1 – 1	Red Bull Salzburg	Grödig
18:30 CEST (UTC+2)	Brauer (yellow card) 15'; Rasner (yellow card) 22' (goal) 55'; Strasser (yellow card) 90+3'	Report	Soriano 15'; Schwegler (yellow card) 37'; Schmitz (yellow card) 65'; Hinteregger (yellow card) 90'	Stadium: Untersberg-Arena; Attendance: 2,000; Referee: Oliver Drachta

1 December 2015 18	Red Bull Salzburg	1 – 1	Wolfsberger AC	Wals-Siezenheim
19:00 CEST (UTC+2)	Schwegler (yellow card) 37'; Pehlivan (yellow card) 40'; Soriano 63'	Report	Wernitznig 34'; Dobnik (yellow card) 89'	Stadium: Red Bull Arena; Attendance: 4,632; Referee: Harald Lechner

6 December 2015 19	SV Mattersburg	0 – 0	Red Bull Salzburg	Mattersburg
16:30 CET (UTC+1)	Höller (yellow card) 90+2'	Report	Soriano (yellow card) 84'; Ćaleta-Car (yellow card) 90+1'; Paulo Miranda (yellow card) 90+2'	Stadium: Pappelstadion; Attendance: 5,200; Referee: Julian Weinberger

13 December 2015 20	Red Bull Salzburg	2 – 0	Rapid Wien	Wals-Siezenheim
16:0 CET (UTC+1)	Soriano 36'; Keïta 56'; Schwegler (yellow card) 78'	Report	Hofmann (yellow card) 22'; Schwab (yellow card) 82'	Stadium: Red Bull Arena; Attendance: 14,150; Referee: Alexander Harkam

7 February 2016 21	Admira Wacker	1 – 2	Red Bull Salzburg	Maria Enzersdorf
16:30 CET (UTC+1)	Spiridonović 51'; Grozurek (yellow card) 73'	Report	Pehlivan (yellow card) 45'; Berisha 50'; Soriano 74'	Stadium: BSFZ-Arena; Attendance: 3,000; Referee: Dominik Ouschan

13 February 2016 22	SV Ried	1 – 0	Red Bull Salzburg	Ried im Innkreis
16:00 CET (UTC+1)	Fröschl 62'; Hart (yellow card) 86'	Report	Paulo Miranda (yellow card) 32'; Pehlivan (yellow card) 72'; Schmitz (yellow card) 83'	Stadium: Keine Sorgen Arena; Attendance: 5,120; Referee: Andreas Kollegger

20 February 2016 23	Red Bull Salzburg	2 – 0	Rheindorf Altach	Wals-Siezenheim
18:30 CET (UTC+1)	Bernardo (yellow card) 24' (yellow-red card) 65'; Miranda 70'; Oberlin 83'	Report	Hofbauer (yellow card) 41'	Stadium: Red Bull Arena; Attendance: 5,749; Referee: Markus Hameter

28 February 2016 24	Red Bull Salzburg	4 – 0	Austria Wien	Wals-Siezenheim
16:30 CET (UTC+1)	Keïta 12', 33'; Soriano 35'; Minamino 70'; Pehlivan (yellow card) 77'	Report	Vukojević (yellow card) 14'; Kayode 17'; Windbichler (yellow card) 57'; Grünwald (yellow card) 85'	Stadium: Red Bull Arena; Attendance: 10,657; Referee: Oliver Drachta

2 March 2016 25	Sturm Graz	0 – 0	Red Bull Salzburg	Graz
20:30 CET (UTC+1)	Potzmann (yellow card) 63'; Spendlhofer (yellow card) 87'	Report	Laimer (yellow card) 65'	Stadium: UPC Arena; Attendance: 5,873; Referee: Julian Weinberger

5 March 2016 26	Red Bull Salzburg	3 – 0	SV Grödig	Wals-Siezenheim
16:00 CEST (UTC+2)	Soriano 6'; Minamino 54'; Ulmer 68'; Mukhtar (yellow card) 89'	Report	Kerschbaum (yellow card) 65'; Denner (yellow card) 76'	Stadium: Red Bull Arena; Attendance: 7,100; Referee: Robert Schörgenhofer

12 March 2016 27	Wolfsberger AC	1 – 1	Red Bull Salzburg	Klagenfurt
16:00 CEST (UTC+2)	Standfest (red card) 11'; Jacobo 85'; Schmerböck (yellow card) 90+2'	Report	Soriano 13' (pen.) (yellow card) 67'; Paulo Miranda (yellow card) 83'	Stadium: Wörthersee Stadion; Attendance: 5,050; Referee: Manuel Schüttengruber

19 March 2016 28	Red Bull Salzburg	2 – 1	SV Mattersburg	Wals-Siezenheim
18:30 CET (UTC+1)	Berisha 16'; Soriano 24' (pen.); Laimer (yellow card) 36'; Hwang (yellow card) 61'	Report	Ibser 56'	Stadium: Red Bull Arena; Attendance: 6,494; Referee: Dieter Muckenhammer

3 April 2016 29	Rapid Wien	1 – 1	Red Bull Salzburg	Vienna
15:00 CEST (UTC+2)	Pavelic (yellow card) 40'; Schaub 46'; Grahovac (yellow card) 72'	Report	Ćaleta-Car 75'; Soriano (yellow card) 81'; Keïta (yellow card) 90+1'	Stadium: Ernst-Happel-Stadion; Attendance: 24,800; Referee: Markus Hameter

10 April 2016 30	Red Bull Salzburg	1 – 0	Admira Wacker	Wals-Siezenheim
16:30 CEST (UTC+2)	Soriano 61'	Report		Stadium: Red Bull Arena; Attendance: 8,109; Referee: Dominik Ouschan

16 April 2016 31	Red Bull Salzburg	2 – 1	SV Ried	Wals-Siezenheim
16:00 CEST (UTC+2)	Keïta 35' (yellow card) 90'; Pehlivan (yellow card) 38'; Soriano 90+2'	Report	Janeczek (yellow card) 53'; Elsneg 54'; Ziegl (yellow card) 90'; Möschl (yellow card) 90+4'	Stadium: Red Bull Arena; Attendance: 9,427; Referee: Julian Weinberger

23 April 2016 32	Rheindorf Altach	1 – 3	Red Bull Salzburg	Altach
18:30 CEST (UTC+2)	Aigner 22'	Report	Keïta 3'; Ćaleta-Car 19'; Schwegler (yellow card) 34'; Lazaro (yellow card) 78'; Ulmer (yellow card) 82'; Laimer 90+6'	Stadium: Stadion Schnabelholz; Attendance: 5,117; Referee: Dieter Muckenhammer

1 May 2016 33	Austria Wien	0 – 2	Red Bull Salzburg	Vienna
16:30 CEST (UTC+2)	Martschinko (yellow card) 26'	Report	Schwegler (yellow card) 27'; Lazaro 36'; Ulmer (yellow card) 70'; Reyna 90+3'	Stadium: Generali Arena; Attendance: 7,513; Referee: Alexander Harkam

7 May 2016 34	Red Bull Salzburg	1 – 1	Sturm Graz	Wals-Siezenheim
18:30 CET (UTC+1)	Berisha 15'; Reyna (yellow card) 21'	Report	Edomwonyi 70'	Stadium: Red Bull Arena; Attendance: 11,327; Referee: Dominik Ouschan

11 May 2016 35	SV Grödig	1 – 2	Red Bull Salzburg	Grödig
20:30 CET (UTC+1)	Schütz 15'; Maak (yellow card) 64'	Report	Minamino 31'; Oberlin 72'; Miranda (yellow card) 89'	Stadium: Untersberg-Arena; Attendance: 2,207; Referee: Christopher Jäger

15 May 2016 36	Red Bull Salzburg	1 – 0	Wolfsberger AC	Wals-Siezenheim
17:30 CEST (UTC+2)	Lazaro 56'	Report	Tschernegg (yellow card) 87'	Stadium: Red Bull Arena; Attendance: 14,138; Referee: Manuel Schüttengruber

=== Austrian Cup ===
18 July 2015 First Round	Deutschlandsberger SC	0 – 7	Red Bull Salzburg	Deutschlandsberg
17:00 CEST (UTC+2)		Report	Soriano 12', 50', 77'; Djuricin 55', 58', 61'; Minamino 87'	Stadium: Venue Koralmstadion; Attendance: 3,500; Referee: Markus Hameter

22 September 2015 Second Round	SV Horn	2 – 3 (a.e.t.)	Red Bull Salzburg	Horn
19:30 CEST (UTC+2)	Sakaki 8'; Jurić (yellow card) 39'; Ljubic (yellow card) 49'; Rakowitz (yellow card) 83' (goal) 85'; Weinwurm (yellow card) 88' (yellow-red card) 100'; Milošević (yellow card) 106'; Vujanović (yellow card) 118'	Report	Minamino 19'; Ulmer (yellow card) 33'; Lazaro (yellow card) 37'; Prevljak 41'; Ćaleta-Car (yellow card) 45'; Schwegler (yellow card) 90+1'; Soriano 92'; Schmitz (yellow card) 97'; Nielsen (yellow card) 113'	Stadium: Waldviertler Volksbank Arena; Attendance: 3,520; Referee: Andreas Kollegger

27 October 2015 Round of 16	Red Bull Salzburg	4 – 2	SV Ried	Wals-Siezenheim
19:00 CET (UTC+1)	Sørensen (yellow card) 3'; Soriano (yellow card) 4' (goal) 31', 72'; Reyna (yellow card) 39'; Berisha 88'; Keïta 90+5'	Report	Kragl 5' (pen.); Gavilán 11'; Hart (yellow card) 29'; Trauner (yellow card) 42'; Gebauer (yellow card) 58'; Janeczek (yellow card) 66'; Reifeltshammer (yellow card) 90+3'	Stadium: Red Bull Arena; Attendance: 3,911; Referee: Alexander Harkam

10 February 2016 Quarterfinal	Sturm Graz	0 – 1	Red Bull Salzburg	Graz
20:30 CEST (UTC+2)	Jeggo (yellow card) 18'; Kamavuaka (yellow card) 60'; Offenbacher (yellow card) 69'	Report	Lainer 29'; Schwegler (yellow card) 54'; Bernardo (yellow card) 80'	Stadium: Liebenauer Stadium; Attendance: 6,248; Referee: Harald Lechner

20 April 2016 Semifinal	Red Bull Salzburg	5 – 2	Austria Wien	Wals-Siezenheim
20:30 CEST (UTC+2)	Soriano 57'; Ulmer 60'; Larsen 72' (o.g.); Laimer 81', 87'	Report	Lucas Venuto 12' (yellow card) 50'; Holzhauser (yellow card) 60'; Kayode (yellow card) 65'; Serbest (yellow card) 71'; Grünwald (yellow card) 79' (goal) 83'; Friesenbichler (yellow card) 85'; Martschinko (yellow card) 90'	Stadium: Red Bull Arena; Attendance: 6,173; Referee: Manuel Schüttengruber

==== Final ====
19 May 2016	Wolfsberger AC	0 – 5	Red Bull Salzburg	Klagenfurt
20:30 CEST (UTC+2)	Toth (yellow card) 61'; Starkl (yellow card) 72'	Report	Soriano 7', 65', 86' (pen.); Keïta 28'; Laimer 73'	Stadium: Wörthersee Stadion; Attendance: 10,200; Referee: Robert Schörgenhofer

=== UEFA Champions League ===
==== Qualifying rounds ====
29 July 2015 3rd qualifying round 1st leg	Red Bull Salzburg (Austria)	2 – 0	(Sweden) Malmö FF	Wals-Siezenheim, Austria
19:00 CEST (UTC+2)	Ulmer 51'; Hinteregger 89' (pen.); Keïta (yellow card) 90+2'	Report	Árnason (yellow card) 3'; Rosenberg (yellow card) 45'	Stadium: Red Bull Arena; Attendance: 15,027; Referee: Luca Banti (Italy)

5 August 2015 3rd qualifying round 2nd leg	Malmö FF (Sweden)	3 – 0 (3 – 2 agg.)	(Austria) Red Bull Salzburg	Malmö, Sweden
20:30 CEST (UTC+2)	Đurđić 7'; Rosenberg 14' (yellow card) 82'; Adu (yellow card) 35' (yellow-red card) 64'; Rodić 42'; Tinnerholm (yellow card) 74'	Report	Keïta (yellow card) 27'; Ulmer (yellow card) 57'; Leitgeb (yellow card) 67'	Stadium: Swedbank Stadion; Attendance: 19,522; Referee: Michael Koukoulakis (Greece)

=== UEFA Europa League ===
==== Qualifying rounds ====
20 August 2015 Playoff round 1st leg	Dinamo Minsk (Belarus)	2 – 0	(Austria) Red Bull Salzburg	Brest, Belarus
18:00 CEST (UTC+2)	Begunov (yellow card) 44'; Rassadkin 57'; Korzun (yellow card) 72'; Adamović 90+3'	Report	Keïta (yellow card) 67'; Miranda (yellow card) 75'; Walke (yellow card) 90+3'; Schwegler (yellow card) 90+4'	Stadium: OSK Brestskiy; Attendance: 9,952; Referee: Miroslav Zelinka (Czech Republic)

27 August 2015 Playoff round 2nd leg	Red Bull Salzburg (Austria)	2 – 0 (a.e.t.) (2 – 2 agg.) (2 – 3 p)	(Belarus) Dinamo Minsk	Wals-Siezenheim, Austria
20:30 CEST (UTC+2)	Minamino 11'; Soriano 58'; Schmitz (yellow card) 65'	Report	Bangura (yellow card) 42'; Begunov (yellow card) 89'	Stadium: Red Bull Arena; Attendance: 7,849; Referee: Kevin Blom (Netherlands)
	Penalties
	Hinteregger (penalty scored); Soriano (penalty scored); Minamino (penalty missed); Atanga (penalty missed); Berisha (penalty missed)		(penalty scored) Bećiraj; (penalty missed) Karytska; (penalty scored) Begunov; (penalty scored) Palitsevich

== Statistics ==
As of match played 19 May 2016

=== Appearances and goals ===
No.	Pos	Nat	Player	Total		Bundesliga		Austrian Cup		UEFA Champions League		UEFA Europa League	
No.	Pos	Nat	Player	Apps	Goals	Apps	Goals	Apps	Goals	Apps	Goals	Apps	Goals
1	GK	(Austria) AUT	Cican Stankovic	9	0	5	0	2	0	2	0	0	0
2	DF	(Germany) GER	Benno Schmitz	32	0	22+2	0	4+1	0	2	0	1	0
3	DF	(Brazil) BRA	Paulo Miranda	38	2	30	2	5	0	2	0	1	0
4	DF	(France) FRA	Dayot Upamecano	2	0	2	0	0	0	0	0	0	0
5	DF	(Croatia) CRO	Duje Ćaleta-Car	37	2	31	2	4	0	0	0	2	0
6	DF	(Switzerland) SUI	Christian Schwegler	30	1	23+2	1	3	0	0	0	1+1	0
8	MF	(Guinea) GUI	Naby Keïta	37	14	24+5	12	4+1	2	2	0	1	0
10	MF	(Austria) AUT	Valentino Lazaro	22	2	9+8	2	2+2	0	0	0	0+1	0
14	MF	(Norway) NOR	Valon Berisha	43	6	32+1	5	5+1	1	2	0	2	0
15	FW	(Peru) PER	Yordy Reyna	22	3	9+7	3	2+1	0	0+1	0	2	0
16	FW	(Israel) ISR	Omer Damari	16	4	15+1	4	0	0	0	0	0	0
17	DF	(Austria) AUT	Andreas Ulmer	44	3	33+1	1	6	1	2	1	2	0
18	FW	(Japan) JPN	Takumi Minamino	40	13	22+10	10	3+3	2	0	0	2	1
20	FW	(Ghana) GHA	David Atanga	10	0	3+2	0	0+1	0	2	0	0+2	0
22	DF	(Austria) AUT	Stefan Lainer	28	2	14+7	1	3+1	1	0+2	0	1	0
23	MF	(Germany) GER	Hany Mukhtar	15	1	3+10	1	1+1	0	0	0	0	0
24	MF	(Austria) AUT	Christoph Leitgeb	7	0	2+1	0	0	0	2	0	2	0
26	FW	(Spain) ESP	Jonathan Soriano	34	32	25+2	21	6	10	0	0	1	1
27	MF	(Austria) AUT	Konrad Laimer	21	4	14+4	1	3	3	0	0	0	0
28	DF	(Denmark) DEN	Asger Sørensen	4	0	0+2	0	1	0	0	0	0+1	0
33	GK	(Germany) GER	Alexander Walke	37	0	31	0	4	0	0	0	2	0
37	FW	(Switzerland) SUI	Dimitri Oberlin	15	3	5+7	3	0	0	2	0	1	0
46	FW	(Bosnia and Herzegovina) BIH	Smail Prevljak	10	2	3+4	1	1+1	1	0+1	0	0	0
47	MF	(Austria) AUT	Xaver Schlager	2	0	1+1	0	0	0	0	0	0	0
48	FW	(South Korea) KOR	Hwang Hee-chan	14	0	5+8	0	0+1	0	0	0	0	0
55	MF	(Austria) AUT	Yasin Pehlivan	17	0	10+6	0	0+1	0	0	0	0	0
95	DF	(Brazil) BRA	Bernardo	16	0	7+6	0	3	0	0	0	0	0
Players away on loan :
9	FW	(Austria) AUT	Marco Djuricin	5	3	2+1	0	1	3	1	0	0	0
11	FW	(Brazil) BRA	Felipe Pires	4	0	2	0	0	0	1+1	0	0	0
36	DF	(Austria) AUT	Martin Hinteregger	13	1	8	0	2	0	2	1	1	0
Players who left Red Bull Salzburg during the season:
19	FW	(Norway) NOR	Håvard Nielsen	12	0	4+4	0	1+2	0	0+1	0	0	0

=== Goal scorers ===
Place	Position	Nation	Number	Name	Bundesliga	Austrian Cup	UEFA Champions League	UEFA Europa League	Total
1	FW	(Spain)	26	Jonathan Soriano	21	10	0	1	32
2	MF	(Guinea)	8	Naby Keïta	12	2	0	0	14
3	FW	(Japan)	18	Takumi Minamino	10	2	0	1	13
4	MF	(Norway)	14	Valon Berisha	5	1	0	0	6
5	FW	(Israel)	16	Omer Damari	4	0	0	0	4
5	MF	(Austria)	27	Konrad Laimer	1	3	0	0	4
7	FW	(Peru)	15	Yordy Reyna	3	0	0	0	3
7	FW	(Switzerland)	37	Dimitri Oberlin	3	0	0	0	3
7	DF	(Austria)	17	Andreas Ulmer	1	1	1	0	3
7	FW	(Austria)	9	Marco Djuricin	0	3	0	0	3
11	MF	(Austria)	10	Valentino Lazaro	2	0	0	0	2
11	DF	(Brazil)	3	Paulo Miranda	2	0	0	0	2
11	DF	(Croatia)	5	Duje Ćaleta-Car	2	0	0	0	2
11	DF	(Austria)	22	Stefan Lainer	1	1	0	0	2
11	DF	(Bosnia and Herzegovina)	46	Smail Prevljak	1	1	0	0	2
11				Own goal	1	1	0	0	2
17	MF	(Germany)	23	Hany Mukhtar	1	0	0	0	1
17	DF	(Switzerland)	6	Christian Schwegler	1	0	0	0	1
17	DF	(Austria)	36	Martin Hinteregger	0	0	1	0	1
				TOTALS	71	25	2	2	100

=== Clean sheets ===
Place	Position	Nation	Number	Name	Bundesliga	Austrian Cup	UEFA Champions League	UEFA Europa League	Total
1	GK	(Germany)	33	Alexander Walke	8	2	0	1	11
2	GK	(Austria)	1	Cican Stankovic	2	1	1	0	4
				TOTALS	10	3	1	1	15

=== Disciplinary record ===
Number	Nation	Position	Name	Bundesliga		Austrian Cup		UEFA Champions League		UEFA Europa League		Total	
Number	Nation	Position	Name	Yellow card	Red card	Yellow card	Red card	Yellow card	Red card	Yellow card	Red card	Yellow card	Red card
2	(Germany)	DF	Benno Schmitz	5	0	1	0	0	0	1	0	7	0
3	(Brazil)	DF	Paulo Miranda	6	0	0	0	0	0	1	0	7	0
5	(Croatia)	DF	Duje Ćaleta-Car	2	0	1	0	0	0	0	0	3	0
6	(Switzerland)	DF	Christian Schwegler	8	0	2	0	0	0	1	0	11	0
8	(Guinea)	MF	Naby Keïta	4	0	0	0	2	0	1	0	7	0
10	(Austria)	MF	Valentino Lazaro	1	0	1	0	0	0	0	0	2	0
14	(Norway)	MF	Valon Berisha	2	0	0	0	0	0	0	0	2	0
15	(Peru)	FW	Yordy Reyna	2	0	1	0	0	0	0	0	3	0
16	(Israel)	FW	Omer Damari	1	0	0	0	0	0	0	0	1	0
17	(Austria)	DF	Andreas Ulmer	4	0	1	0	1	0	0	0	6	0
20	(Ghana)	FW	David Atanga	2	0	0	0	0	0	0	0	2	0
22	(Austria)	DF	Stefan Lainer	3	0	0	0	0	0	0	0	3	0
23	(Germany)	MF	Hany Mukhtar	1	0	0	0	0	0	0	0	1	0
24	(Austria)	MF	Christoph Leitgeb	0	0	0	0	1	0	0	0	1	0
26	(Spain)	FW	Jonathan Soriano	4	0	1	0	0	0	0	0	5	0
27	(Austria)	MF	Konrad Laimer	2	0	0	0	0	0	0	0	2	0
28	(Denmark)	DF	Asger Sørensen	0	0	1	0	0	0	0	0	1	0
33	(Germany)	GK	Alexander Walke	0	0	0	0	0	0	1	0	1	0
48	(South Korea)	FW	Hwang Hee-chan	1	0	0	0	0	0	0	0	1	0
55	(Austria)	MF	Yasin Pehlivan	5	0	0	0	0	0	0	0	5	0
95	(Brazil)	DF	Bernardo	2	1	1	0	0	0	0	0	3	1
Players away on loan:
11	(Brazil)	FW	Felipe Pires	1	0	0	0	0	0	0	0	1	0
36	(Austria)	DF	Martin Hinteregger	3	0	0	0	0	0	0	0	3	0
Players who left Red Bull Salzburg during the season:
19	(Norway)	FW	Håvard Nielsen	0	0	1	0	0	0	0	0	1	0
			TOTALS	59	1	11	0	3	0	5	0	78	1
