= Benno Schmitz =

German footballer

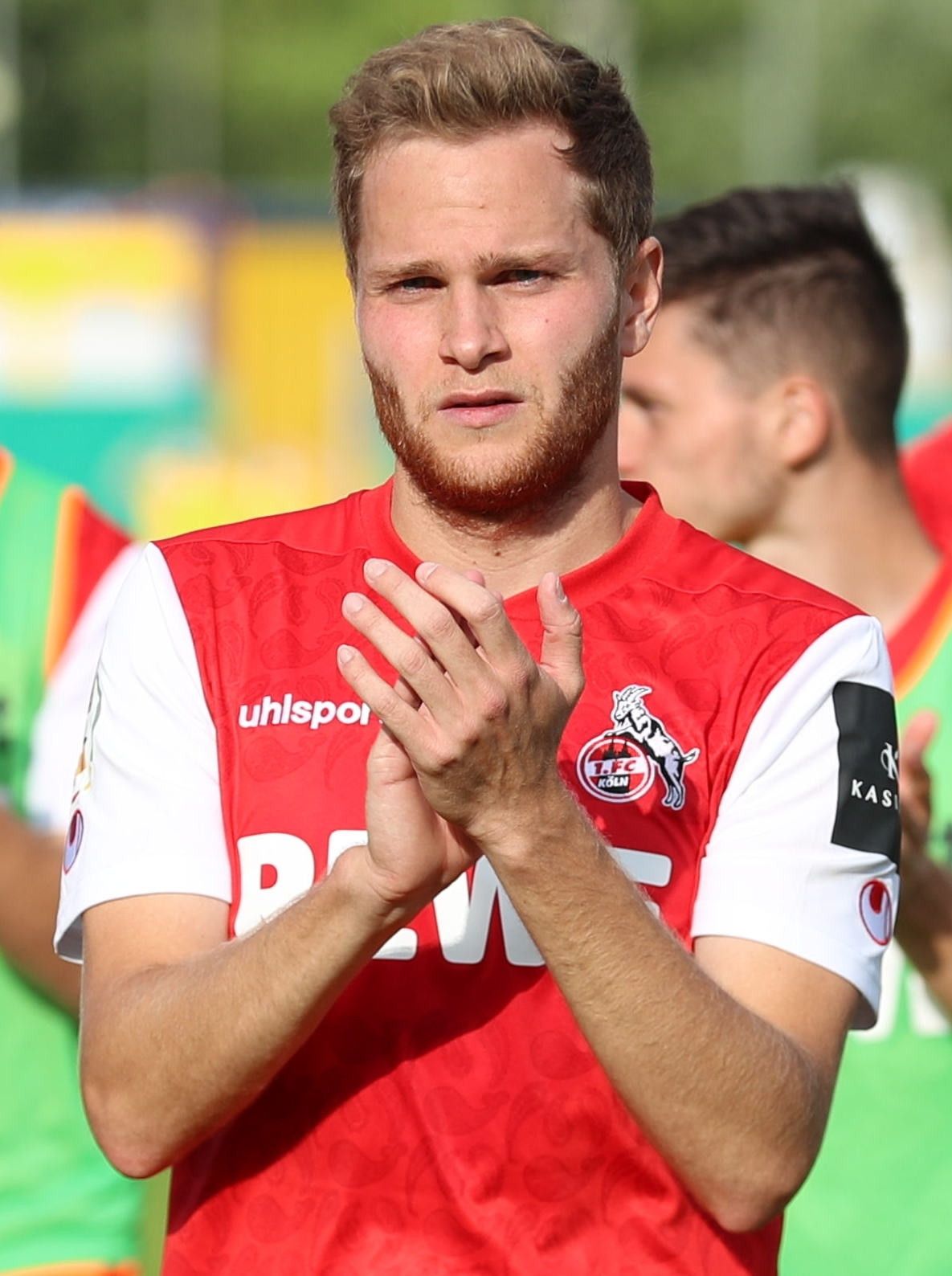
- Schmitz with 1. FC Köln (2021)

Personal information
- Date of birth: 17 November 1994 (age 31)
- Place of birth: Munich, Germany
- Height: 1.82 m (6 ft 0 in)
- Positions: Defender; defensive midfielder

Team information
- Current team: Bayern Munich II

Youth career
- –2001: SV Waldperlach
- 2001–2013: Bayern Munich

Senior career*
Years	Team	Apps	(Gls)
2012–2014	Bayern Munich II	46	(3)
2014	FC Liefering	7	(0)
2014–2016	Red Bull Salzburg	45	(0)
2016–2018	RB Leipzig	18	(0)
2018−2024	1. FC Köln	130	(1)
2024−2025	Grasshopper	26	(0)
2025−	Bayern Munich II	28	(0)

International career^{‡}
2013	Germany U20	11	(0)
- * Club domestic league appearances and goals as of 15 September 2026 ‡ National team caps and goals as of 25 August 2014

Benno Schmitz (born 17 November 1994) is a German professional footballer who plays as a defender and defensive midfielder for Regionalliga Bayern club Bayern Munich II. He is a former German youth international.

== Club career ==
Schmitz started playing football at local Munich club SV Waldperlach. In 2001, he joined the youth ranks of Bayern Munich where he eventually was promoted to their reserve team in 2012, having failed to establish himself at the first team, he left the club and signed for Austrian champion Red Bull Salzburg in the summer of 2014.

On 23 August 2014, he made his league debut in a 5–0 home win against Rheindorf Altach by coming on as a substitute for Christian Schwegler after 83 minutes. In 2018, after a quiet stint with Leipzig, Schmitz was transferred to newly relegated side 1. FC Köln for a fee of €1.5 million. In March 2022, having established himself in the club's starting line-up during the 2021–22 season, Schmitz extended his contract at Köln until June 2024.

On 25 July 2024, he joined Swiss Super League side Grasshopper on a free transfer. He joins the Swiss record champions on a three-year deal until 2027. On 23 June 2025, it was confirmed that Schmitz would return to his native Germany and join Bayern Munich II with immediate effect, the same team with whom he made his professional debut. This moves comes due to familial reasons. He made 30 appearances for Grasshopper and supplied seven assists.

== Career statistics ==
As of 15 September 2026

Appearances and goals by club, season and competition
Club	Season	League			Cup		Continental		Other		Total		Ref.
Club	Season	Division	Apps	Goals	Apps	Goals	Apps	Goals	Apps	Goals	Apps	Goals	Ref.
Bayern Munich II	2012–13	Regionalliga Bayern	9	0	—		—		—		9	0	
Bayern Munich II	2013–14	Regionalliga Bayern	35	3	—		—		2 (Note: Appearances in the Regionalliga promotion play-offs)	0	37	3	
Bayern Munich II	Total		44	3	—		—		2	0	46	3	—
FC Liefering	2014–15	Erste Liga	7	0	0	0	—		—		7	0	
Red Bull Salzburg	2014–15	Austrian Bundesliga	21	0	5	0	2 (Note: Appearances in the Europa League)	0	—		28	0	
Red Bull Salzburg	2015–16	Austrian Bundesliga	24	0	5	0	3 (Note: Two appearances in the Champions League and one in the Europa League)	0	—		32	0	
Red Bull Salzburg	Total		45	0	10	0	5	0	—		60	0	—
RB Leipzig	2016–17	Bundesliga	16	0	1	0	—		—		17	0	
RB Leipzig	2017–18	Bundesliga	2	0	0	0	0	0	—		2	0	
RB Leipzig	Total		18	0	1	0	0	0	—		19	0	—
1. FC Köln II	2018−19	Regionalliga West	1	0	—		—		—		1	0	
1. FC Köln II	2019−20	Regionalliga West	1	0	—		—		—		1	0	
1. FC Köln	2018−19	2. Bundesliga	15	0	0	0	—		—		15	0	
1. FC Köln	2019−20	Bundesliga	18	0	1	0	—		—		19	0	
1. FC Köln	2020−21	Bundesliga	12	0	2	0	—		1 (Note: Appearances in the Relegation play-off)	0	15	0	
1. FC Köln	2021−22	Bundesliga	31	0	2	0	—		—		33	0	
1. FC Köln	2022−23	Bundesliga	31	1	1	0	4 (Note: Appearances in the Europa Conference League)	0	—		36	1	
1. FC Köln	2023−24	Bundesliga	22	0	2	1	—		—		24	1	
1. FC Köln	Total		129	1	8	1	4	0	1	0	142	2	—
Grasshopper	2024−25	Swiss Super League	26	0	2	0	—		2 (Note: Appearances in the relegation playoff)	0	30	0	
Grasshopper	Total		26	0	2	0	—		2	0	30	0	—
Bayern Munich II	2025−26	Regionalliga Bayern	21	0	—		—		—		21	0	
Bayern Munich II	2026–27	Regionalliga Bayern	7	0	—		—		7	0			
Bayern Munich II	Total		28	0	—		—		—		28	0	—
Career total			299	4	21	1	9	0	5	0	334	5	—

== Honours ==
RB Salzburg (4)

- Austrian Bundesliga: 2014–15, 2015–16
- Austrian Cup: 2014–15, 2015–16
