= Andreas Ulmer =

Austrian footballer (born 1985)

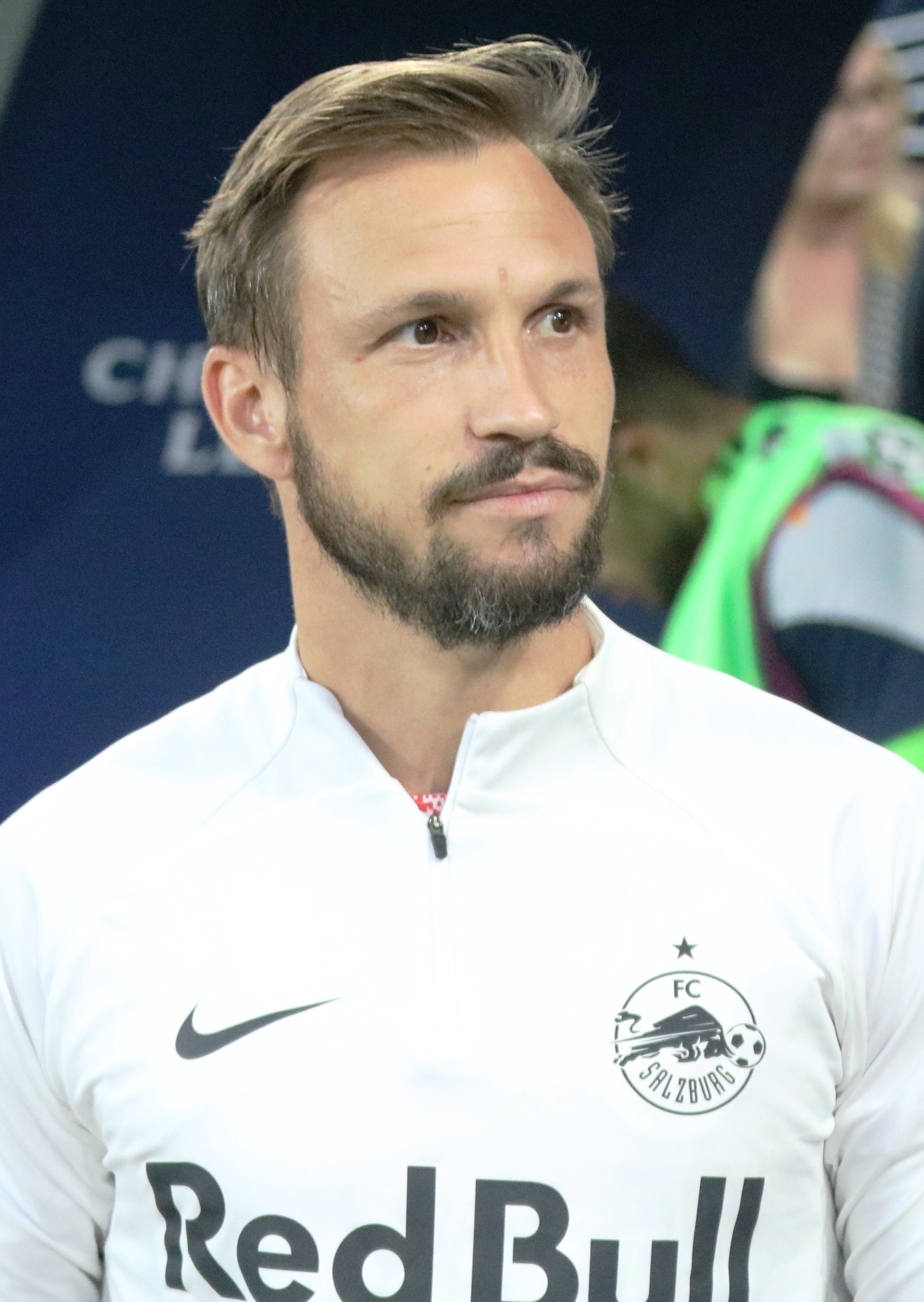
- Ulmer with Red Bull Salzburg in 2023

Personal information
- Date of birth: 30 October 1985 (age 40)
- Place of birth: Linz, Austria
- Height: 1.75 m (5 ft 9 in)
- Position: Left-back

Team information
- Current team: FC Liefering (assistant coach)

Youth career
- SK Lenze Asten
- LASK

Senior career*
Years	Team	Apps	(Gls)
2004–2008	Austria Wien II	95	(3)
2004–2008	Austria Wien	3	(0)
2008–2009	SV Ried	22	(1)
2009–2024	Red Bull Salzburg	395	(16)
Total		515	(20)

International career
2005	Austria U20	1	(0)
2006	Austria U21	1	(0)
2009–2023	Austria	32	(0)
- * Club domestic league appearances and goals

Andreas Ulmer (German pronunciation: [anˈdʁeːas ˈʔʊlmɐ]; born 30 October 1985) is an Austrian professional football manager and former player who plays as a defender. He is the former captain of Austrian Bundesliga club Red Bull Salzburg, where he played for sixteen seasons and won 22 trophies, and also represented the Austria national team. Ulmer currently works as an assistant coach for 2. Liga club FC Liefering and the Austria national under-15 team.

== Club career ==
Born in Linz, Ulmer joined the Frank Stronach Akademie to make his professional debut for Austria Wien in the 2004–2005 season. In summer 2008, he joined SV Ried. On 28 January 2009, it was announced that Ulmer was transferred to Red Bull Salzburg with immediate effect. During the 2017–18 season, Salzburg had their best ever European campaign. They finished top of their Europa League group, for a record fourth time, before beating Real Sociedad and Borussia Dortmund thus making their first ever appearance in the UEFA Europa League semi-finals. On 3 May 2018, he played in the Europa League semi-finals against Marseille, as his side played out a 1–2 away win but a 3–2 aggregate loss as the side failed to secure a place in the 2018 Europa League final.

Following the conclusion of the 2023–24 season, Ulmer departed Salzburg at the age of 38, having made 582 appearances for the club across sixteen seasons, during which time he won thirteen league titles and nine Austrian Cups.

== Career statistics ==
=== Club ===
Appearances and goals by club, season and competition
Club	Season	League			Austrian Cup		Europe		Total	
Club	Season	Division	Apps	Goals	Apps	Goals	Apps	Goals	Apps	Goals
Austria Wien II	2004–05	Austrian Regionalliga East	25	2	1	0	—		26	2
Austria Wien II	2005–06	Austrian First League	18	0	2	0	—		20	0
Austria Wien II	2006–07	Austrian First League	20	1	0	0	—		20	1
Austria Wien II	2007–08	Austrian First League	32	0	—		—		32	0
Austria Wien II	Total		95	3	3	0	—		98	3
Austria Wien	2004–05	Austrian Bundesliga	1	0	0	0	0	0	1	0
Austria Wien	2006–07	Austrian Bundesliga	2	0	0	0	1 (Note: Appearance in UEFA Cup)	0	3	0
Austria Wien	Total		3	0	0	0	1	0	4	0
SV Ried	2008–09	Austrian Bundesliga	22	1	3	0	—		25	1
Red Bull Salzburg	2008–09	Austrian Bundesliga	15	0	0	0	0	0	15	0
Red Bull Salzburg	2009–10	Austrian Bundesliga	36	0	3	0	13 (Note: Eight appearances in UEFA Champions League, two appearances in UEFA Europa League)	0	52	0
Red Bull Salzburg	2010–11	Austrian Bundesliga	9	0	0	0	3 (Note: Appearances in UEFA Champions League)	1	12	1
Red Bull Salzburg	2011–12	Austrian Bundesliga	20	1	5	0	7 (Note: Appearances in UEFA Europa League)	0	32	1
Red Bull Salzburg	2012–13	Austrian Bundesliga	26	0	5	0	2	0	33	0
Red Bull Salzburg	2013–14	Austrian Bundesliga	30	2	5	0	12 (Note: Two appearances in UEFA Champions League, ten appearances in UEFA Europa League)	0	47	2
Red Bull Salzburg	2014–15	Austrian Bundesliga	21	2	2	1	9 (Note: Three appearances in UEFA Champions League, six appearances in UEFA Europa League)	0	32	3
Red Bull Salzburg	2015–16	Austrian Bundesliga	34	1	6	1	4 (Note: Two appearances and one goal in UEFA Champions League, two appearances in UEFA Europa League)	1	44	3
Red Bull Salzburg	2016–17	Austrian Bundesliga	30	4	2	0	11 (Note: Six appearances in UEFA Champions League, five appearances in UEFA Europa League)	0	43	4
Red Bull Salzburg	2017–18	Austrian Bundesliga	26	3	3	0	20 (Note: Four appearances in UEFA Champions League, sixteen appearances and one goal in UEFA Europa League)	1	49	4
Red Bull Salzburg	2018–19	Austrian Bundesliga	28	0	5	0	14 (Note: Four appearances in UEFA Champions League, ten appearances in UEFA Europa League)	0	47	0
Red Bull Salzburg	2019–20	Austrian Bundesliga	29	2	5	0	8 (Note: Six appearances and one goal in UEFA Champions League, two appearances and one goal in UEFA Europa League)	2	42	4
Red Bull Salzburg	2020–21	Austrian Bundesliga	30	0	4	0	10 (Note: Eight appearances in UEFA Champions League, two appearances in UEFA Europa League)	0	44	0
Red Bull Salzburg	2021–22	Austrian Bundesliga	27	1	3	0	10	0	40	1
Red Bull Salzburg	2022–23	Austrian Bundesliga	21	0	3	0	8 (Note: Six appearances in UEFA Champions League, two appearances in UEFA Europa League)	0	32	0
Red Bull Salzburg	2023–24	Austrian Bundesliga	13	0	2	0	3	0	18	0
Red Bull Salzburg	Total		395	16	53	2	134	5	582	23
Career total			515	20	59	2	135	5	709	27

=== International ===
Appearances and goals by national team and year
National team	Year	Apps	Goals
Austria	2009	2	0
Austria	2014	1	0
Austria	2017	1	0
Austria	2018	5	0
Austria	2019	8	0
Austria	2020	4	0
Austria	2021	9	0
Austria	2022	1	0
Austria	2023	1	0
Total		32	0

== Honours ==
Austria Wien

- Austrian Bundesliga: 2005–06

Red Bull Salzburg

- Austrian Bundesliga: 2008–09, 2009–10, 2011–12, 2013–14, 2014–15, 2015–16, 2016–17, 2017–18, 2018–19, 2019–20, 2020–21, 2021–22, 2022–23
- Austrian Cup: 2011–12, 2013–14, 2014–15, 2015–16, 2016–17, 2018–19, 2019–20, 2020–21, 2021–22

Individual

- Austrian Bundesliga Player of the Year: 2016–17
- Austrian Bundesliga Team of the Year: 2017–18, 2018–19, 2019–20, 2020–21, 2021–22
