= David Atanga =

Ghanaian footballer (born 1996)

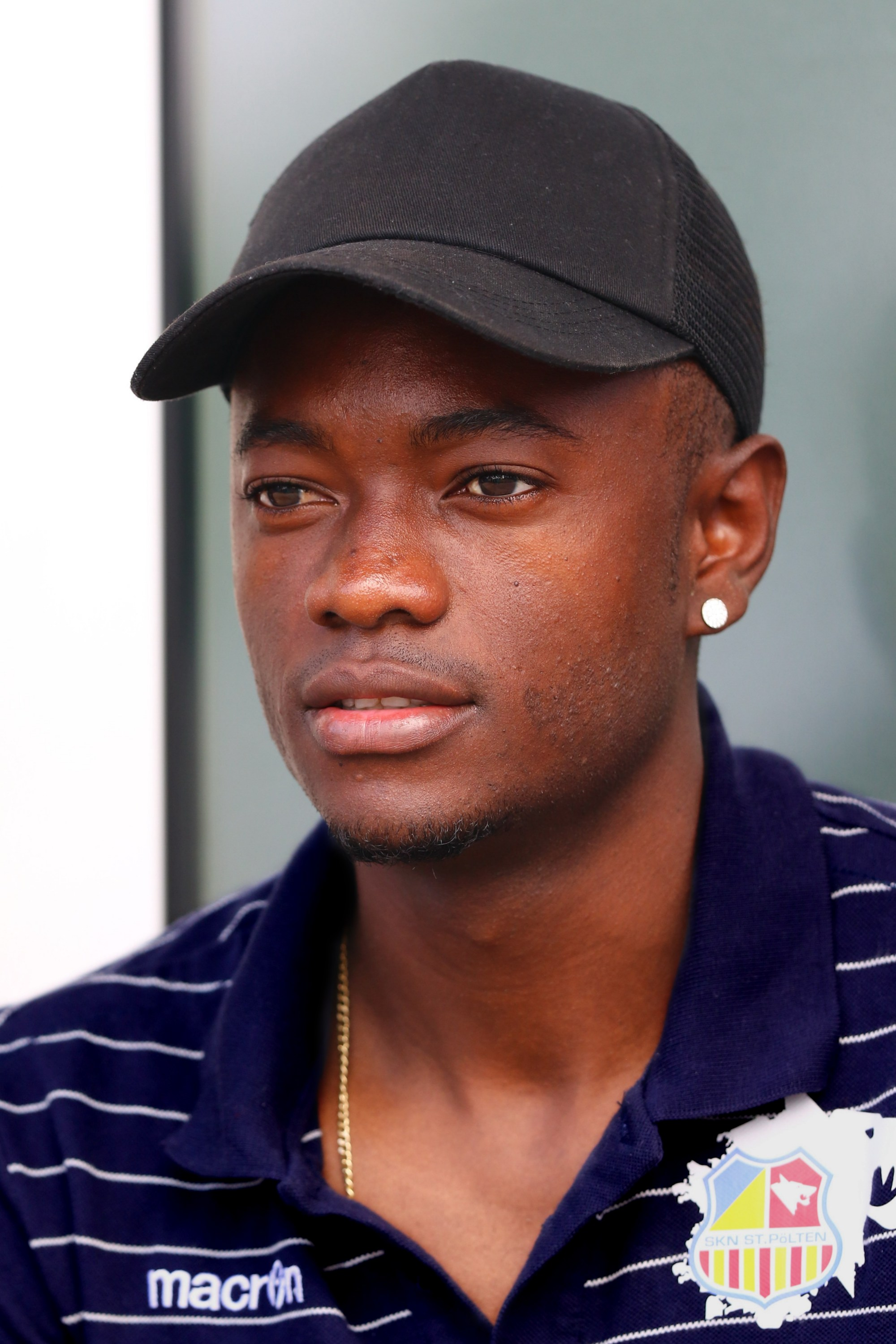
- Atanga with SKN St. Pölten in 2018

Personal information
- Date of birth: 25 December 1996 (age 29)
- Place of birth: Bolgatanga, Ghana
- Height: 1.81 m (5 ft 11 in)
- Position: Winger

Youth career
- Red Bull Ghana

Senior career*
Years	Team	Apps	(Gls)
2015–2017	FC Liefering	36	(12)
2015–2019	Red Bull Salzburg	6	(0)
2016	→ 1. FC Heidenheim (loan)	4	(0)
2017	→ SV Mattersburg (loan)	15	(3)
2018	→ SKN St. Pölten (loan)	13	(5)
2018–2019	→ Greuther Fürth (loan)	31	(1)
2019–2021	Holstein Kiel	19	(0)
2021	→ Admira Wacker (loan)	15	(2)
2021–2024	KV Oostende	67	(7)
2024–2026	Wolfsberger AC	33	(5)

International career
2015	Ghana U20	5	(0)
- * Club domestic league appearances and goals as of 10 June 2026

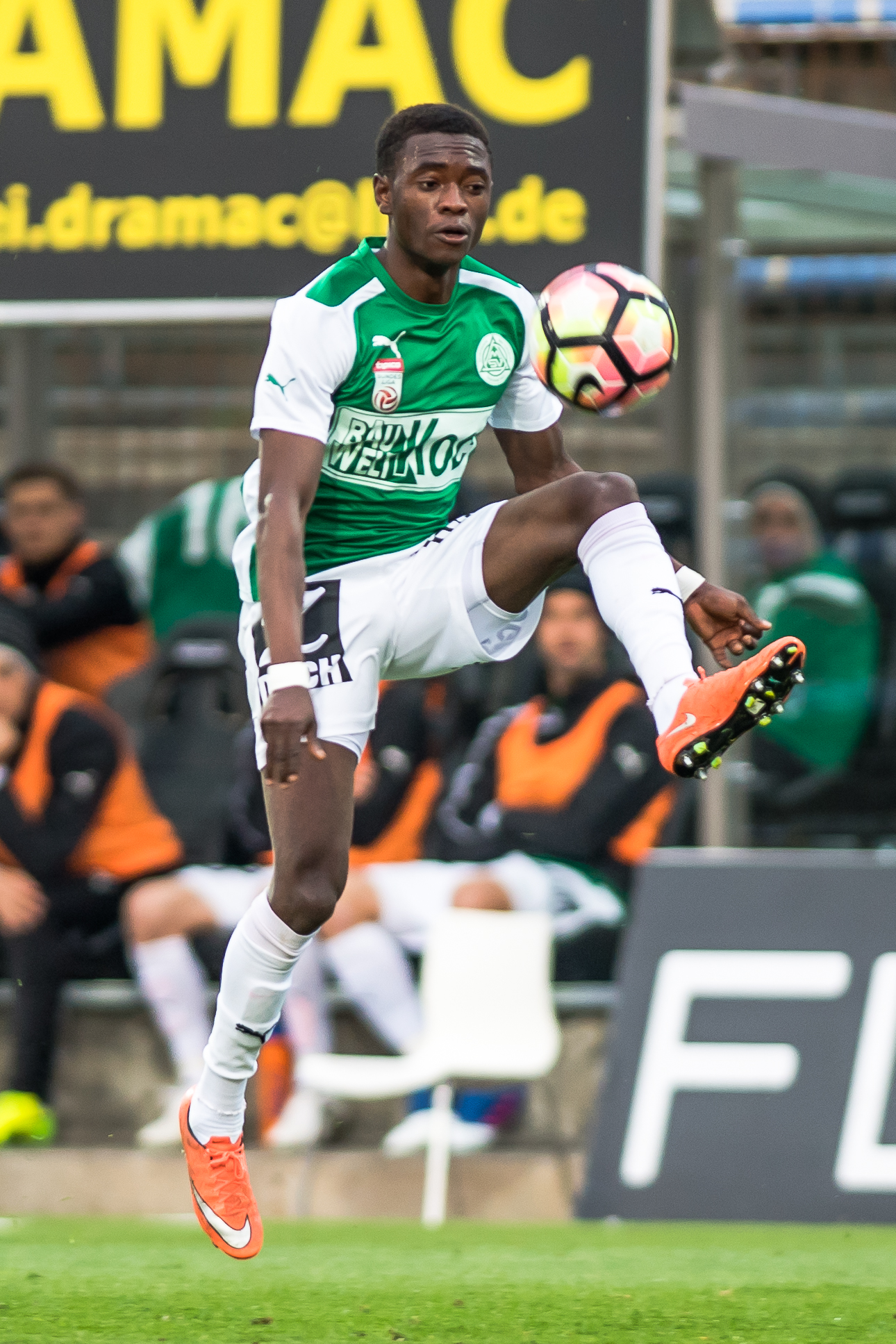
Atanga playing für SV Mattersburg in 2017

David Atanga (born 25 December 1996) is a Ghanaian professional footballer who plays as a winger.

== Club career ==
=== Early career ===
Atanga joined Red Bull Salzburg academy in 2014. In June 2015, Atanga signed new five-year deal with the club. On 25 July, he made his first-team debut for Red Bull Salzburg.

On 1 July 2016, Atanga left on loan to join 2. Bundesliga team 1. FC Heidenheim. After only four appearances for Heidenheim, Atanga returned to Salzburg before again leaving on loan. During his time in Austria, Atanga was played 36 times and scored 12 goals for Salzburg's farm team FC Liefering. On 19 January 2017, Atanga joined Austrian Football Bundesliga side SV Mattersburg on a six-month loan.

In June 2018, SpVgg Greuther Fürth announced Atanga would join on loan for the 2018–19 season.

=== Holstein Kiel ===
In June 2019, Atanga permanently moved signing with 2. Bundesliga side Holstein Kiel for the 2019–20 season. He agreed a three-year contract with the club.

On 18 January 2021, Atanga moved to Austrian club Admira Wacker, on a loan until the end of the season.

=== KV Oostende ===
On 6 August 2021, KV Oostende announced the signing of Atanga on a three-year deal.

== International career ==
Atanga has played five times for Ghana at U20 level, winning four of those caps during the 2015 FIFA U-20 World Cup in New Zealand.

== Career statistics ==
=== Club ===
As of 29 July 2020

Appearances and goals by club, season and competition
Club	Season	League			National cup (Note: Includes the Austrian Cup and DFB-Pokal.)		League cup		Continental (Note: Includes the UEFA Champions League and UEFA Europa League.)		Other		Total	
Club	Season	Division	Apps	Goals	Apps	Goals	Apps	Goals	Apps	Goals	Apps	Goals	Apps	Goals
FC Liefering	2014–15	Austrian First League	13	2	—		—		—		0	0	13	2
FC Liefering	2015–16	Austrian First League	23	10	—		—		—		0	0	23	10
FC Liefering	2016–17	Austrian First League	0	0	—		—		—		0	0	0	0
FC Liefering	2017–18	Austrian First League	7	2	—		—		—		0	0	0	0
FC Liefering	Total		43	14	—		—		—		0	0	43	14
Red Bull Salzburg	2014–15	Austrian Bundesliga	0	0	0	0	—		0	0	0	0	0	0
Red Bull Salzburg	2015–16	Austrian Bundesliga	5	0	1	0	—		4 (Note: Two appearances in 2015–16 UEFA Champions League, two appearances in the 2015–16 UEFA Europa League)	0	0	0	10	0
Red Bull Salzburg	2016–17	Austrian Bundesliga	0	0	0	0	—		0	0	0	0	0	0
Red Bull Salzburg	2017–18	Austrian Bundesliga	1	0	1	0	—		0	0	0	0	2	0
Red Bull Salzburg	Total		6	0	2	0	—		4	0	0	0	12	0
1. FC Heidenheim (loan)	2016–17	2. Bundesliga	4	0	1	0	—		—		0	0	5	0
SV Mattersburg (loan)	2016–17	Austrian Bundesliga	15	3	—		—		—		0	0	15	3
SKN St. Pölten (loan)	2017–18	Austrian Bundesliga	13	5	—		—		—		1	1	14	6
Greuther Fürth (loan)	2018–19	2. Bundesliga	31	1	1	0	—		—		–		32	1
Holstein Kiel	2019–20	2. Bundesliga	19	0	1	1	—		—		–		20	1
Admira Wacker (loan)	2020–21	Austrian Bundesliga	15	2	0	0	—		—		–		15	2
Career total			146	25	5	1	—		4	0	1	1	156	27

== Honours ==
Red Bull Salzburg

- Austrian Football Bundesliga: 2015–16
- Austrian Cup: 2015–16
