= Airton (footballer, born 1994) =

Brazilian footballer

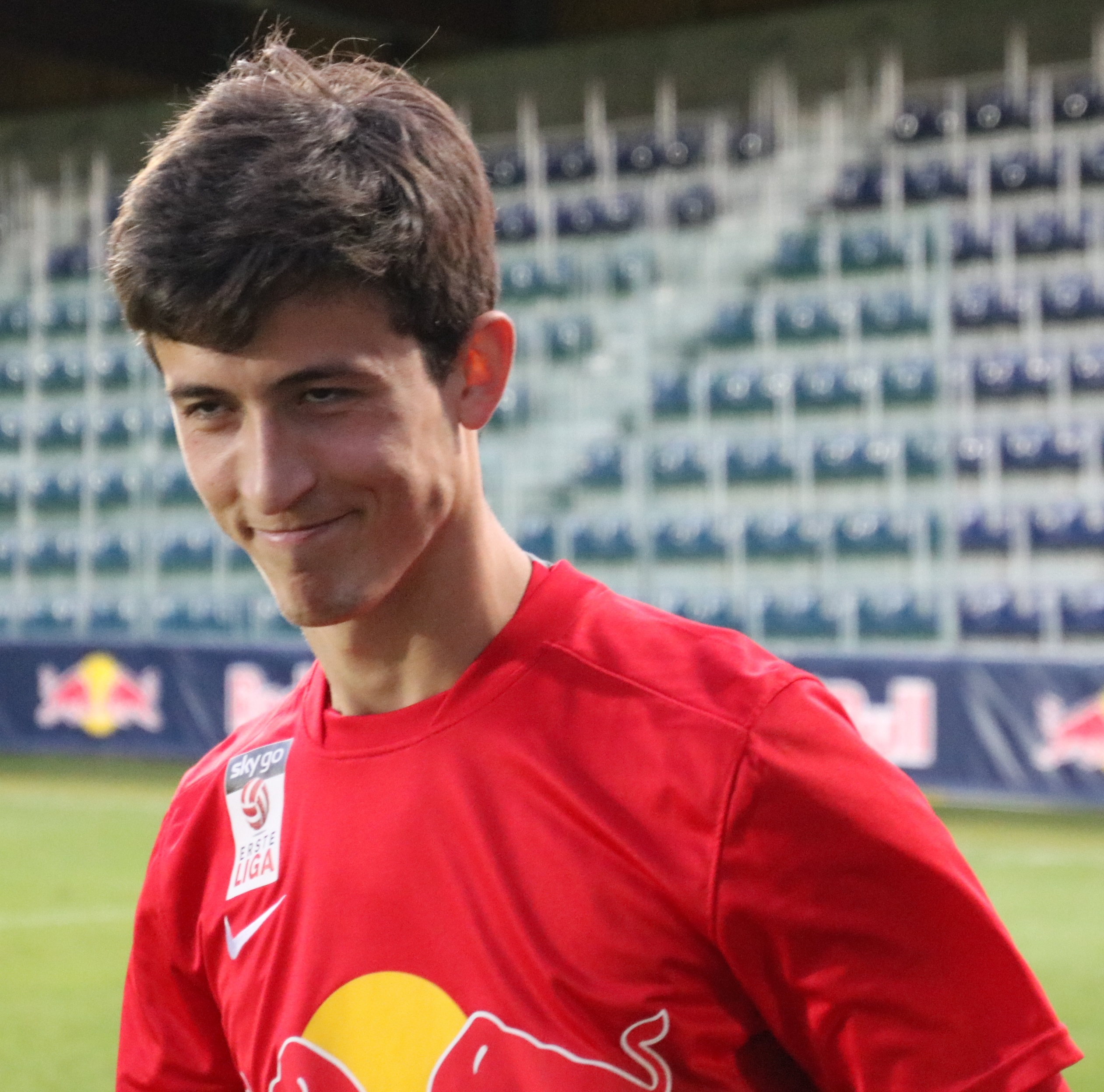

Personal information
- Full name: Airton Moraes Michellon
- Date of birth: 29 May 1994 (age 32)
- Place of birth: São Marcos, Brazil
- Height: 1.88 m (6 ft 2 in)
- Position: Goalkeeper

Team information
- Current team: Criciúma
- Number: 32

Youth career
- –2013: Juventude

Senior career*
Years	Team	Apps	(Gls)
2013–2015	Juventude	35	(0)
2015–2016	FC Liefering	9	(0)
2015–2017	Red Bull Salzburg	0	(0)
2017–2018	Red Bull Brasil	0	(0)
2018	→ Oeste (loan)	1	(0)
2019	Pelotas	11	(0)
2019–2022	América Mineiro	44	(0)
2023	Chapecoense	45	(0)
2024–2026	Novorizontino	43	(0)
2026	Vila Nova	10	(0)
2026–	Criciúma	12	(0)
- * Club domestic league appearances and goals as of 8 July 2026

Airton Moraes Michellon (born 29 May 1994), known simply as Airton, is a Brazilian footballer who currently plays as a goalkeeper for Criciúma.

== Career ==
Airton joined Red Bull Salzburg on the 1 July 2015 from Juventude.

== Career statistics ==
As of 27 March 2021.

Club	Season	League			State League		Cup		Continental		Other		Total	
Club	Season	Division	Apps	Goals	Apps	Goals	Apps	Goals	Apps	Goals	Apps	Goals	Apps	Goals
Juventude	2013	Série D	4	0	0	0	—		—		1 (Note: Appearances in the Copa FGF)	0	5	0
Juventude	2014	Série C	11	0	0	0	—		—		0	0	11	0
Juventude	2015	Série C	2	0	18 (Note: Appearances in the Campeonato Gaúcho)	0	—		—		—		20	0
Juventude	Total		17	0	18	0	—		—		1	0	36	0
Liefering	2015–16	Erste Liga	9	0	—		—		—		—		9	0
Red Bull Salzburg	2015–16	Austrian Bundesliga	0	0	—		0	0	—		—		0	0
Red Bull Salzburg	2016–17	Austrian Bundesliga	0	0	—		0	0	0	0	—		0	0
Red Bull Salzburg	Total		0	0	—		0	0	0	0	—		0	0
Red Bull Brasil	2017	Série D	0	0	0	0	—		—		—		0	0
Red Bull Brasil	2018	Paulista	—		0	0	—		—		—		0	0
Red Bull Brasil	Total		0	0	0	0	—		—		—		0	0
Oeste (loan)	2018	Série B	1	0	—		—		—		—		1	0
Pelotas	2019	Gaúcho	—		11	0	—		—		—		11	0
América Mineiro	2019	Série B	17	0	—		0	0	—		—		17	0
América Mineiro	2020	Série B	5	0	12	0	3	0	—		—		20	0
América Mineiro	2021	Série A	0	0	1	0	0	0	—		—		1	0
América Mineiro	2022	Série A	1	0	5	0	0	0	—		—		6	0
América Mineiro	Total		23	0	18	0	3	0	—		—		44	0
Career total			50	0	47	0	3	0	0	0	1	0	101	0
