= Jonathan Soriano =

Spanish professional footballer (born 1985)

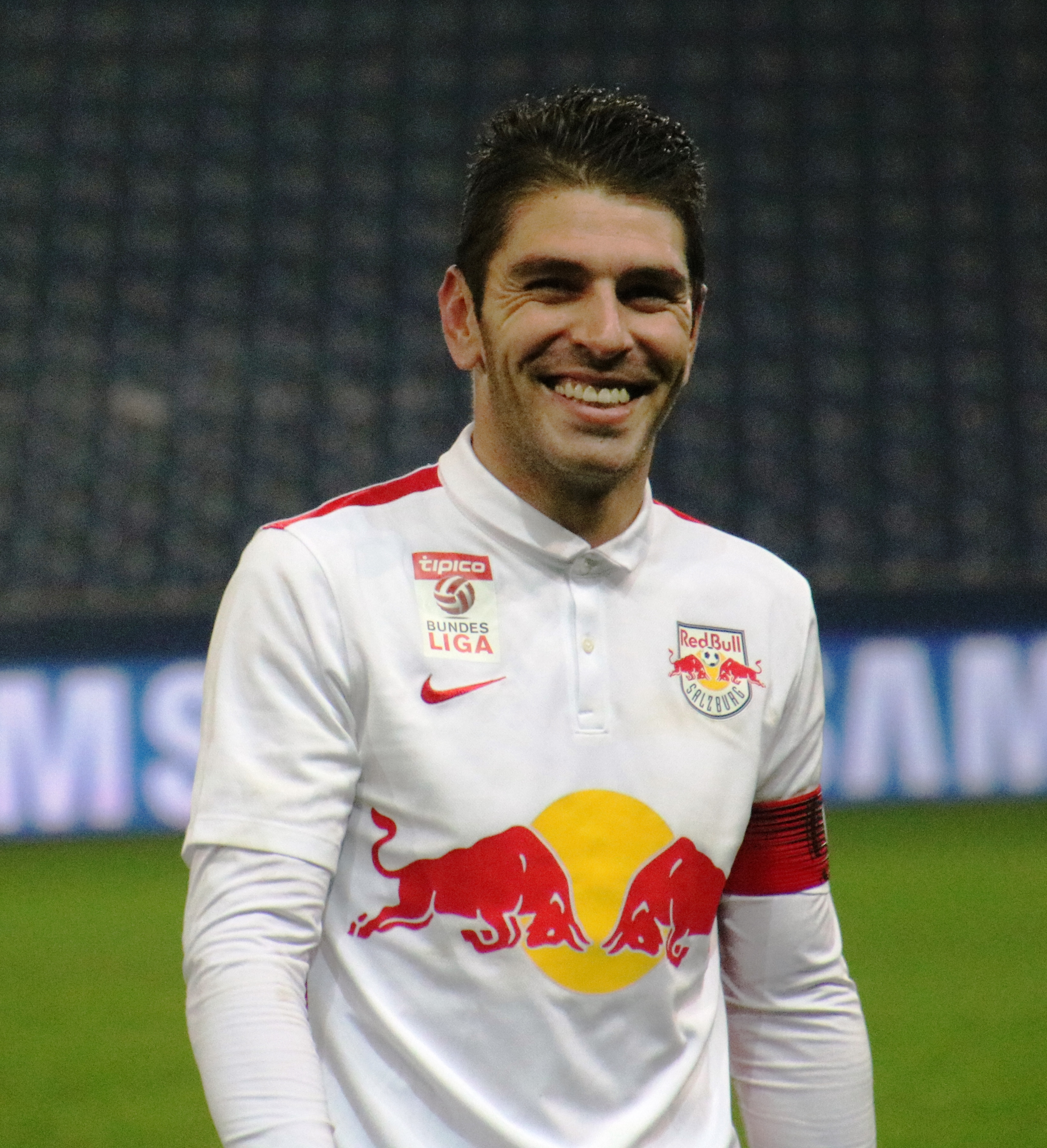
- Soriano with Red Bull Salzburg in 2015

Personal information
- Full name: Jonathan Soriano Casas
- Date of birth: 24 September 1985 (age 41)
- Place of birth: El Pont de Vilomara, Spain
- Height: 1.80 m (5 ft 11 in)
- Position: Striker

Youth career
- 1995–2001: Espanyol

Senior career*
Years	Team	Apps	(Gls)
2001–2005	Espanyol B	70	(32)
2002–2009	Espanyol	43	(3)
2006	→ Almería (loan)	17	(6)
2007	→ Poli Ejido (loan)	12	(2)
2009	→ Albacete (loan)	11	(1)
2009–2012	Barcelona B	79	(55)
2009	Barcelona	0	(0)
2012–2017	Red Bull Salzburg	144	(120)
2017–2018	Beijing Guoan	31	(25)
2019	Al Hilal	8	(3)
2019–2020	Girona	16	(1)
2021	Castellón	8	(0)
Total		439	(248)

International career
2001–2003	Spain U17	15	(18)
2003	Spain U19	2	(0)
2005	Spain U20	4	(1)
2005	Spain U21	4	(8)
2004–2014	Catalonia	6	(1)
- * Club domestic league appearances and goals

Jonathan Soriano Casas (Spanish pronunciation: [ˈɟʝonatan soˈɾjano ˈkasas]; born 24 September 1985) is a Spanish former professional footballer who played as a striker.

He spent his early career with Espanyol and Barcelona, mostly with the respective reserve teams. In January 2012 he moved to Red Bull Salzburg, where he won four league and cup doubles, also finishing as the Austrian Football Bundesliga's top scorer three times; he totalled 172 goals in 202 matches for the latter club.

Soriano earned 25 caps for Spain at youth level, scoring 27 times. He also played for Catalonia.

== Club career ==
=== Espanyol ===
Born in El Pont de Vilomara i Rocafort, Barcelona, Catalonia, Soriano emerged through RCD Espanyol's youth ranks. He made his debut with the first team during the 2002–03 season, playing one minute in a 3–1 La Liga home win against Rayo Vallecano while still registered with the B side. He was not admitted as a full-time member of the main squad until 2005–06.

Soriano spent the second halves of that and the following campaigns serving Segunda División loan stints, after which he returned to the Estadi Olímpic Lluís Companys, scoring twice in 24 appearances during the season, incidentally in both 1–0 victories over Getafe CF.

In late January 2009, Soriano moved again on loan (and in the second tier), joining Albacete Balompié until the end of the campaign and being released by Espanyol after this spell, his contract not having been renewed.

=== Barcelona ===
On 30 July 2009, Soriano joined FC Barcelona's reserves in Segunda División B. He made his official first-team debut on 28 October 2009, playing the dying minutes of the 2–0 win at Cultural y Deportiva Leonesa in the round of 32 of the Copa del Rey (7–0 on aggregate). In the league, he ranked amongst the season's top scorers as the team returned to the second division after an 11-year absence.

Soriano fared even better in 2010–11, netting 32 times as Barcelona B finished in the promotion play-offs zone, being however ineligible for contention. This tally gave him the division's Pichichi Trophy, and in the process he eclipsed the club's previous record for most goals by a player in a single season, which was 15 by Martín Domínguez in 1987–88. His performances caught the eyes of Real Betis, and his failure to get a contract with Barcelona was compared to the success of 2. Bundesliga top scorer Nils Petersen in signing for FC Bayern Munich.

=== Red Bull Salzburg ===
On 19 January 2012, Soriano moved to the Austrian Football Bundesliga with FC Red Bull Salzburg. In his first year he helped his team win the double, but needing time to adapt, he contributed only five goals in 15 games.

Soriano was sent off on 17 July 2012 in a 1–0 loss at F91 Dudelange, having played only 37 minutes as a substitute for Gonzalo Zárate in the first leg of the second qualifying round of the UEFA Champions League. He struck 26 goals in 32 games over the league season, including a hat-trick on 20 April 2013 in a 6–2 win against Wolfsberger AC; that morning, he witnessed his wife Cristina Sabater giving birth to their daughter.

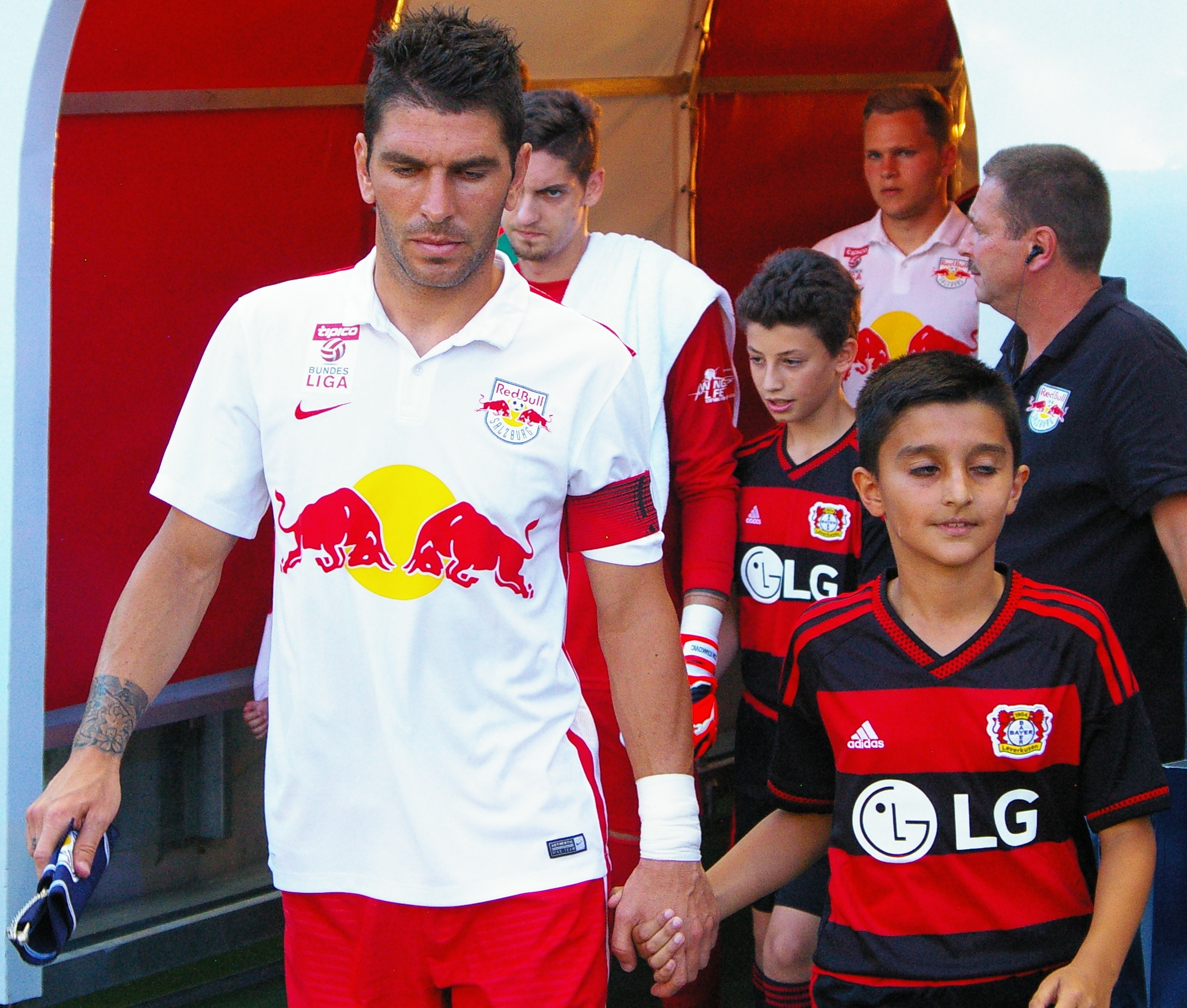
Soriano leading his team out for a friendly against Bayer Leverkusen in July 2015.

In the summer of 2013, Soriano was appointed Red Bull's new captain. He scored a hat-trick in their UEFA Europa League play-off first leg against VMFD Žalgiris Vilnius, a 5–0 victory on 22 August. In his team's first match in the group stage, on 19 September, he added another three to help to a 4–0 home defeat of IF Elfsborg. In the round of 32, he grabbed a brace in a 2–0 win at AFC Ajax, and despite the team exiting in the next stage, he was the tournament's top scorer with eight goals, only the second Spaniard to do so after Rayo Vallecano's Bolo in 2000–01.

Soriano was the league's top scorer with 31 goals in 28 games – including four hat-tricks – as Salzburg regained the title. The Austrian Cup also returned to the team, and he netted another treble in a 9–0 first-round rout of lowly Union St. Florian. In the final on 18 May, he scored twice in a 4–2 win over SKN St. Pölten at the Wörthersee Stadion.

On 10 August 2014, Soriano scored five goals in an 8–0 home league demolition of SV Grödig. On 6 November, he netted a hat-trick as Salzburg won 5–1 at GNK Dinamo Zagreb in the Europa League group stage. He extended his contract in January of the following year until June 2018 or 2019, and at the end of the campaign was voted the league's Player of the Year. In the cup final, he scored an extra-time goal in a 2–0 win over FK Austria Wien.

On 26 September 2015, Soriano scored four goals in a 4–2 home win against SV Mattersburg. On 24 October, he netted his 100th league goal whilst helping to a 2–1 victory over SV Ried also at the Red Bull Arena. He arrived at the century mark in 113 games, quicker than national icons Hans Krankl and Toni Polster, and by the following March he had achieved 150 goals in 170 matches across all competitions; manager Óscar García stated: "He is the best footballer I have ever worked with. I hope he never leaves".

For the third successive year, Soriano was the top scorer as his team won the league, and he scored three times in a 5–0 win over FC Admira Wacker Mödling in the cup final to seal another double. In March 2017, the club retired his number 26 jersey.

=== Beijing Guoan ===
On 26 February 2017, Soriano signed for Beijing Sinobo Guoan F.C. after recommendation from former club player Frédéric Kanouté. He scored regularly over his first season in the Chinese Super League, although his team finished ninth. On 23 July, his brace gave them a 2–1 win at Shanghai Greenland Shenhua FC.

=== Later years ===
On 14 December 2018, free agent Soriano moved to Saudi Professional League club Al Hilal SFC on a one-and-a-half-year contract. He returned to his home country on 31 August 2019, after agreeing to a one-year deal at second-tier Girona FC.

On 7 March 2021, after nearly eight months without a club, Soriano signed a short-term contract with CD Castellón, also in the second division. On 24 September, his 36th birthday, he officially announced his retirement from professional football.

== International career ==
Soriano was the top scorer at the 2002 UEFA European Under-17 Championship with seven goals, as Spain came fourth in Denmark. All of his goals came in group stage victories, a hat-trick against Moldova between braces against the Czech Republic and FR Yugoslavia.

On 8 February 2005, as a half-time replacement for Alberto Zapater, Soriano scored four times for the under-21 team in a 14–0 thrashing of San Marino in El Ejido. He also took part on the Catalan representative side, scoring their goal in a draw with Paraguay at the Camp Nou on 28 December 2005.

== Career statistics ==
Appearances and goals by club, season and competition
Club	Season	League			National cup (Note: Includes Copa del Rey, Austrian Cup, Chinese FA Cup, King's Cup)		Continental		Other		Total	
Club	Season	Division	Apps	Goals	Apps	Goals	Apps	Goals	Apps	Goals	Apps	Goals
Espanyol B	2000–01	Segunda División B	1	0	—		—		—		1	0
Espanyol B	2001–02	Segunda División B	11	2	—		—		—		11	2
Espanyol B	2002–03	Segunda División B	25	9	—		—		—		25	9
Espanyol B	2003–04	Segunda División B	16	6	—		—		—		16	6
Espanyol B	2004–05	Segunda División B	17	15	—		—		—		17	15
Espanyol B	Total		70	32	—		—		—		70	32
Espanyol	2002–03	La Liga	1	0	—		—		—		1	0
Espanyol	2004–05	La Liga	7	1	—		—		—		7	1
Espanyol	2005–06	La Liga	3	0	2	2	3 (Note: Appearances in UEFA Cup)	0	—		8	2
Espanyol	2006–07	La Liga	1	0	1	0	—		—		2	0
Espanyol	2007–08	La Liga	24	2	3	1	—		—		27	3
Espanyol	2008–09	La Liga	7	0	5	0	—		—		12	0
Espanyol	Total		43	3	11	3	3	0	—		57	6
Almería (loan)	2005–06	Segunda División	17	6	—		—		—		17	6
Poli Ejido (loan)	2006–07	Segunda División	12	2	—		—		—		12	2
Albacete (loan)	2008–09	Segunda División	11	1	—		—		—		11	1
Barcelona B	2009–10	Segunda División B	32	18	—		—		5 (Note: Appearances in Segunda División B play-offs)	4	37	22
Barcelona B	2010–11	Segunda División	37	32	—		—		—		37	32
Barcelona B	2011–12	Segunda División	10	5	—		—		—		10	5
Barcelona B	Total		79	55	—		—		5	4	84	59
Barcelona	2009–10	La Liga	0	0	1	0	—		—		1	0
Red Bull Salzburg	2011–12	Austrian Bundesliga	11	3	2	2	2	0	—		15	5
Red Bull Salzburg	2012–13	Austrian Bundesliga	33	26	4	3	1 (Note: Appearance in UEFA Champions League)	0	—		38	29
Red Bull Salzburg	2013–14	Austrian Bundesliga	28	31	4	5	11 (Note: Two appearances and one goal in UEFA Champions League, nine appearances and eleven goals in UEFA Europa League)	12	—		43	48
Red Bull Salzburg	2014–15	Austrian Bundesliga	32	31	5	7	12 (Note: Four appearances and two goals in UEFA Champions League, eight appearances and six goals in UEFA Europa League)	8	—		49	46
Red Bull Salzburg	2015–16	Austrian Bundesliga	27	21	6	10	1 (Note: Appearance in UEFA Europa League)	1	—		34	32
Red Bull Salzburg	2016–17	Austrian Bundesliga	13	8	0	0	10 (Note: Six appearances and three goals in UEFA Champions League, four appearances and one goal in UEFA Europa League)	4	—		23	12
Red Bull Salzburg	Total		144	120	21	27	37	25	—		202	172
Beijing Guoan	2017	Chinese Super League	19	16	1	3	—		—		20	19
Beijing Guoan	2018	Chinese Super League	12	9	4	3	—		—		16	12
Beijing Guoan	Total		31	25	5	6	—		—		36	31
Al Hilal	2018–19	Saudi Pro League	8	3	3	0	—		2 (Note: Appearances in Arab Club Champions Cup)	1	13	4
Girona	2019–20	Segunda División	16	1	1	2	—		—		17	3
Castellón	2020–21	Segunda División	8	0	0	0	—		—		8	0
Career total			439	248	42	38	40	25	7	5	528	316

== Honours ==
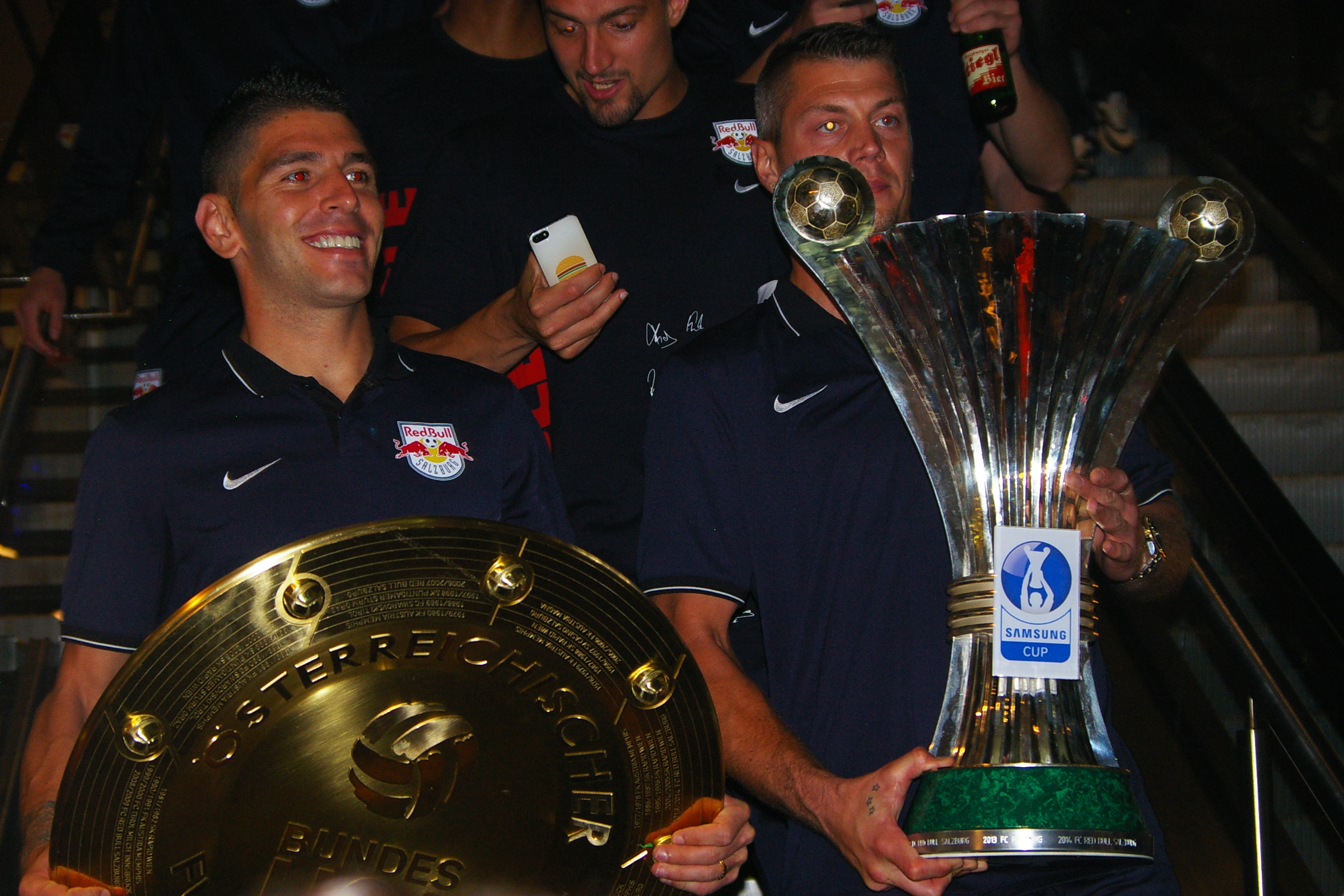
Salzburg celebrating their 2015 double: Soriano is holding the Bundesliga shield, and Alexander Walke holds the Austrian Cup.

Espanyol

- Copa del Rey: 2005–06

Red Bull Salzburg

- Austrian Football Bundesliga: 2011–12, 2013–14, 2014–15, 2015–16
- Austrian Cup: 2011–12, 2013–14, 2014–15, 2015–16

Beijing Guoan

- Chinese FA Cup: 2018

Individual

- Pichichi Trophy/Zarra Trophy (Segunda División): 2010–11
- Austrian Football Bundesliga top scorer: 2013–14, 2014–15, 2015–16
- UEFA Europa League top scorer: 2013–14
- UEFA Europa League Squad of the Season: 2013–14
