= Bernhard Janeczek =

Austrian footballer (born 1992)

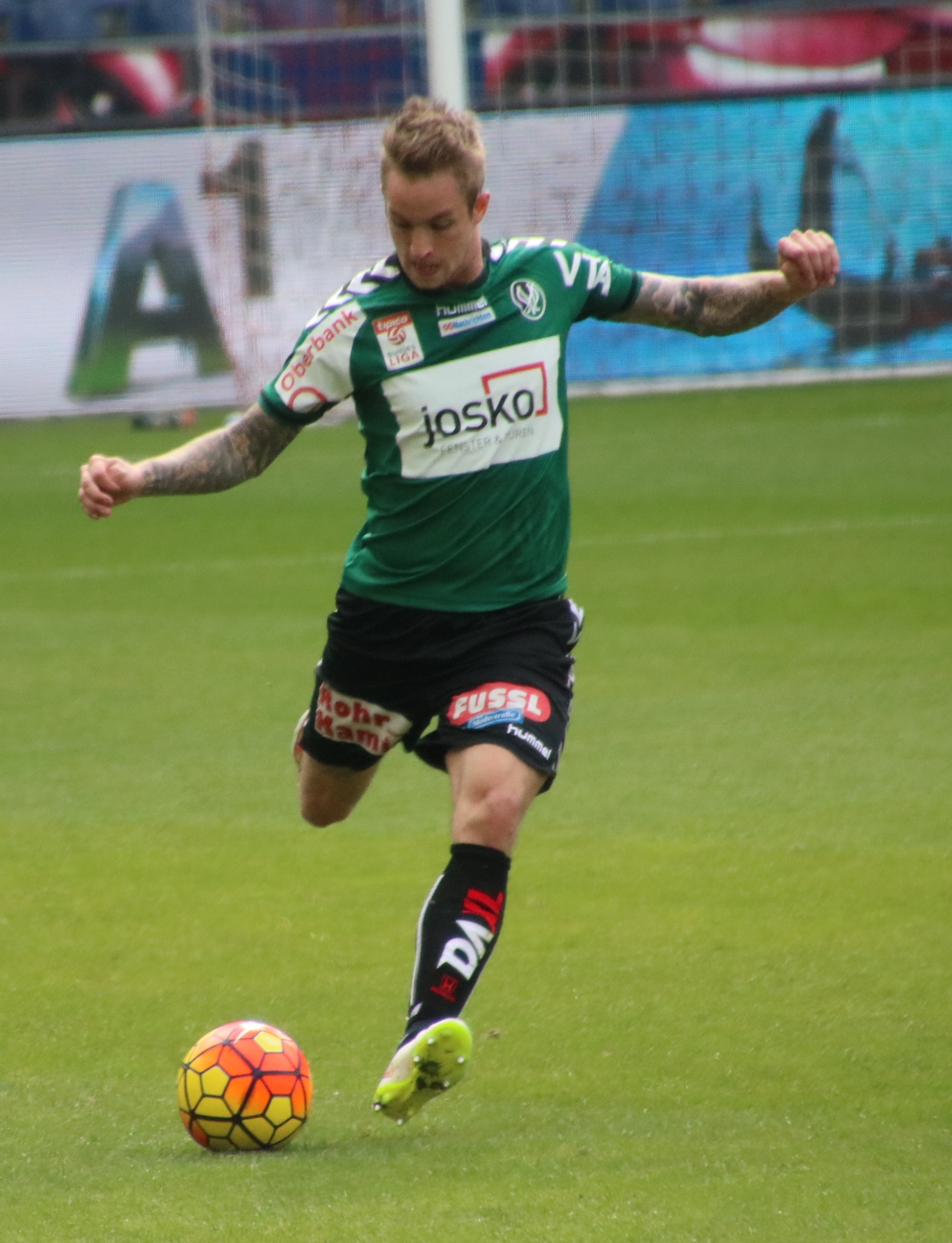

Personal information
- Date of birth: 10 March 1992 (age 34)
- Place of birth: Vienna, Austria
- Height: 1.83 m (6 ft 0 in)
- Position: Centre back

Youth career
- 1998–2007: Admira Wacker
- 2007–2008: Rapid Wien
- 2008–2010: Borussia Mönchengladbach

Senior career*
Years	Team	Apps	(Gls)
2010–2013	Borussia Mönchengladbach II	45	(2)
2013–2016	SV Ried	74	(1)
2016–2017	Dinamo București	0	(0)
2017–2018	Rheindorf Altach	0	(0)
2018–2022	Blau-Weiß Linz	51	(1)
2022–2024	Wiener Neustädt	17	(0)

International career
2007	Austria U16	1	(0)
2008–2009	Austria U17	11	(1)
2013	Austria U21	2	(0)
- * Club domestic league appearances and goals

Bernhard Janeczek (born 10 March 1992) is an Austrian former professional footballer who played as a centre-back.
