= Michael Brandner (footballer) =

Austrian footballer

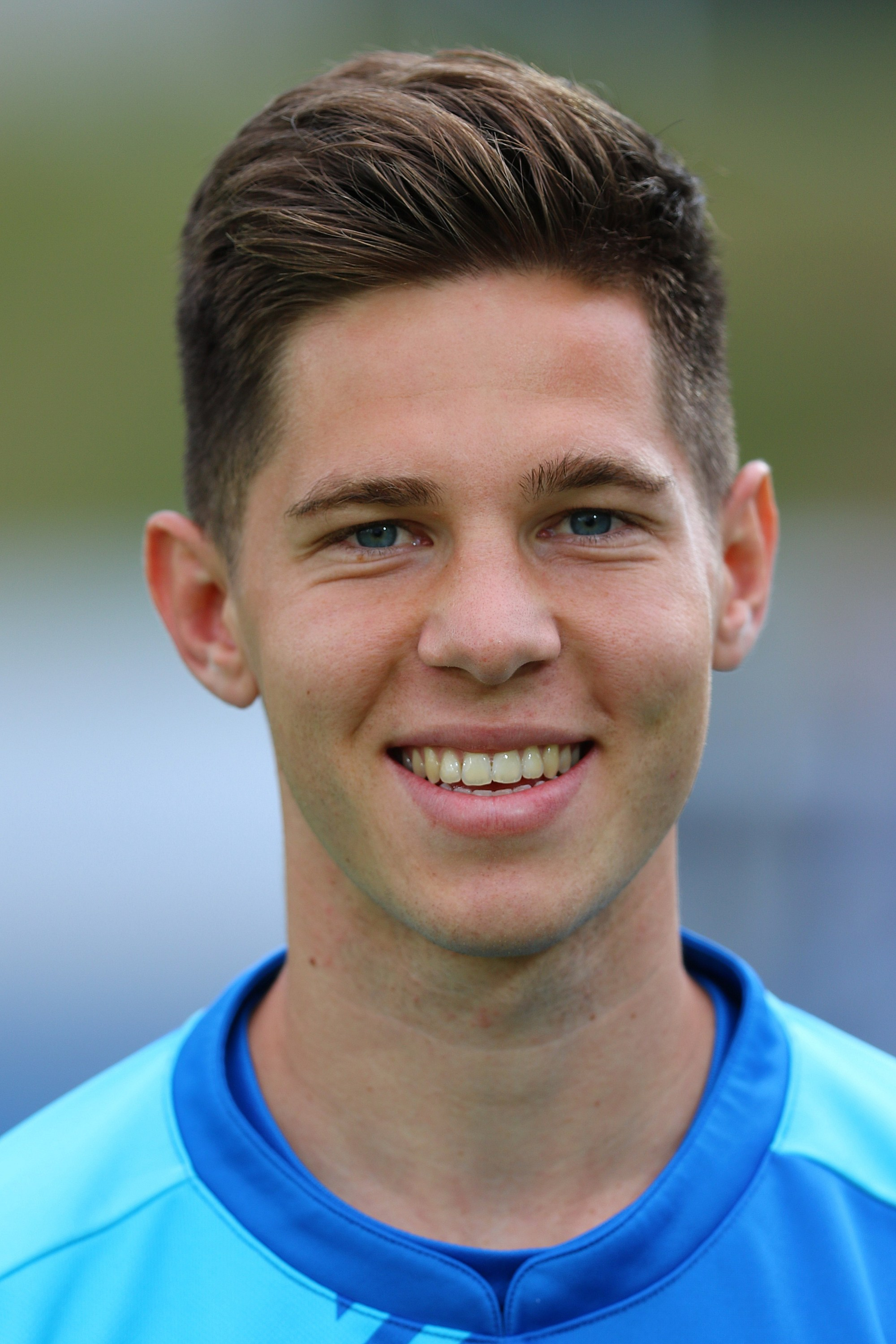

Personal information
- Date of birth: 13 February 1995 (age 31)
- Place of birth: Salzburg, Austria
- Height: 1.77 m (5 ft 10 in)
- Position: Midfielder

Team information
- Current team: Union Mondsee

Youth career
- 2002–2013: Red Bull Salzburg

Senior career*
| Years | Team | Apps | (Gls) |
| 2013–2017 | FC Liefering | 73 | (4) |
| 2016–2017 | → SV Ried (loan) | 24 | (0) |
| 2017–2019 | Wiener Neustadt | 27 | (1) |
| 2019–2024 | Blau-Weiß Linz | 104 | (8) |
| 2024– | Union Mondsee | 6 | (1) |

International career
| 2010 | Austria U16 | 2 | (0) |
| 2011 | Austria U17 | 6 | (1) |
| 2012–2013 | Austria U18 | 4 | (0) |
| 2013–2014 | Austria U19 | 11 | (0) |
| 2015 | Austria U20 | 5 | (0) |
- * Club domestic league appearances and goals as of 18 October 2024

Michael Brandner (born 13 February 1995) is an Austrian professional association football player who plays for fourth-tier OÖ Liga club Union Mondsee.

== Career ==
=== Blau-Weiß Linz ===
On 14 June 2019, Brandner joined FC Blau-Weiß Linz on a 2-year contract.

== Honours ==
FC Liefering

Runner-up

- Austrian Football First League: 2014–15
