= Christian Schwegler =

Swiss footballer (born 1984)

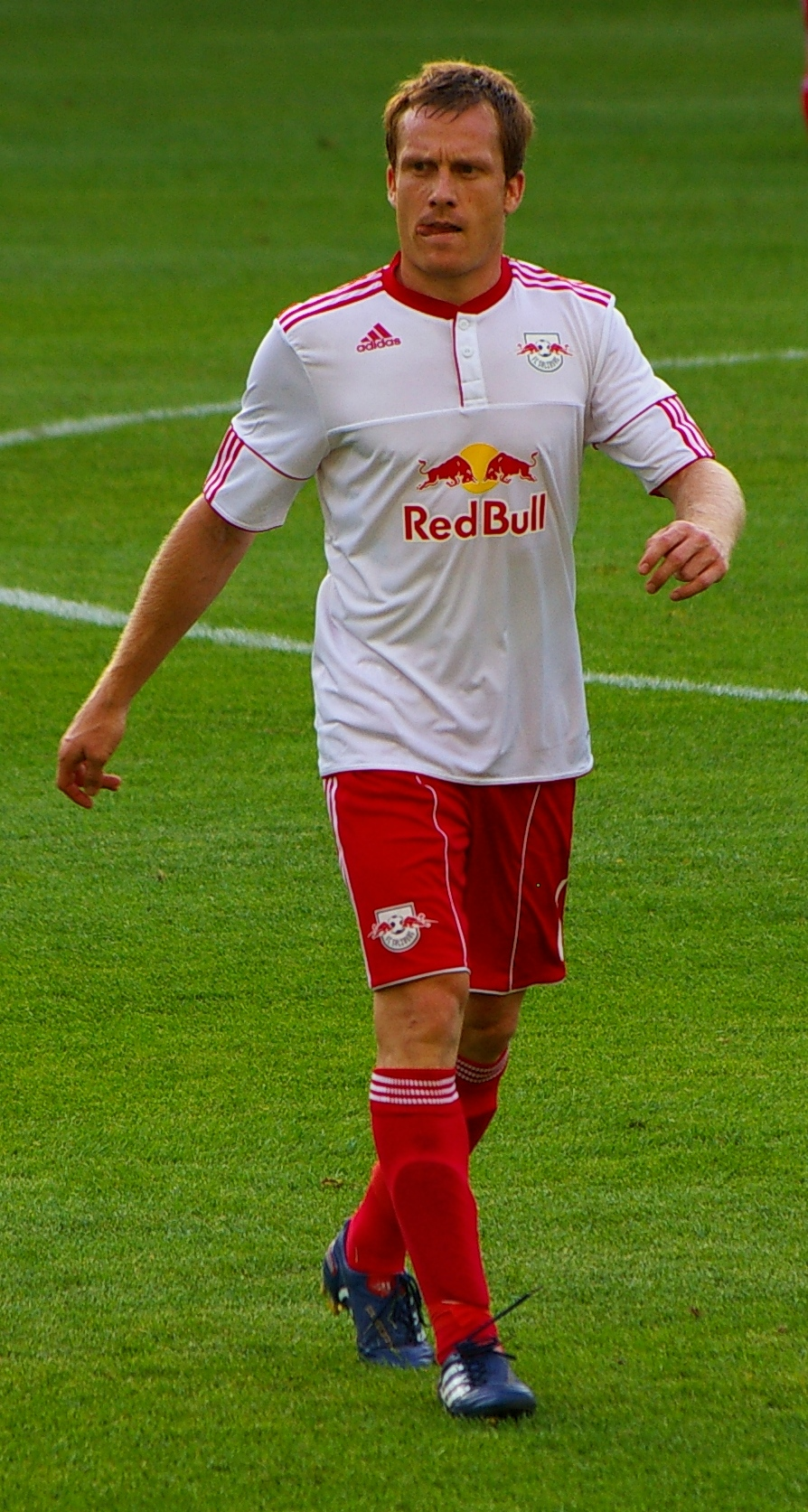

Personal information
- Date of birth: 6 June 1984 (age 42)
- Place of birth: Ettiswil, Switzerland
- Height: 1.73 m (5 ft 8 in)
- Position: Right back

Senior career*
Years	Team	Apps	(Gls)
2003–2005	Luzern	95	(0)
2005	Arminia Bielefeld II	7	(0)
2006–2009	BSC Young Boys	106	(1)
2009–2017	Red Bull Salzburg	166	(4)
2017–2021	Luzern	66	(0)

International career
2003–2006	Switzerland U-21	6	(0)
- * Club domestic league appearances and goals

Christian Schwegler (born 6 June 1984) is a former footballer from Switzerland who played as defender.

== Career ==
Christian joined Red Bull Salzburg during the summer of 2009 from Young Boys Bern for a fee of €0.6m. During the Red Bulls' 6–1 win over SV Mattersburg on 27 March 2010, Schwegler scored his first goal since joining the club.

In the 2017–18 season, Schwegler returned to FC Luzern. At the beginning of 2020, he became captain for FC Luzern. His contract was extended by one year until the end of June 2021.

== Playing style ==
Schwegler is known for his long throw-ins.

== Personal life ==
He is the brother of Pirmin Schwegler.

== Honors ==
=== FC Red Bull Salzburg ===
- Austrian Champion (5): 2010, 2012, 2014, 2015, 2016
- Austrian Cup (4): 2012, 2014, 2015, 2016

=== FC Luzern ===
- Swiss Cup (1): 2021
