= Dieter Elsneg =

Austrian professional footballer

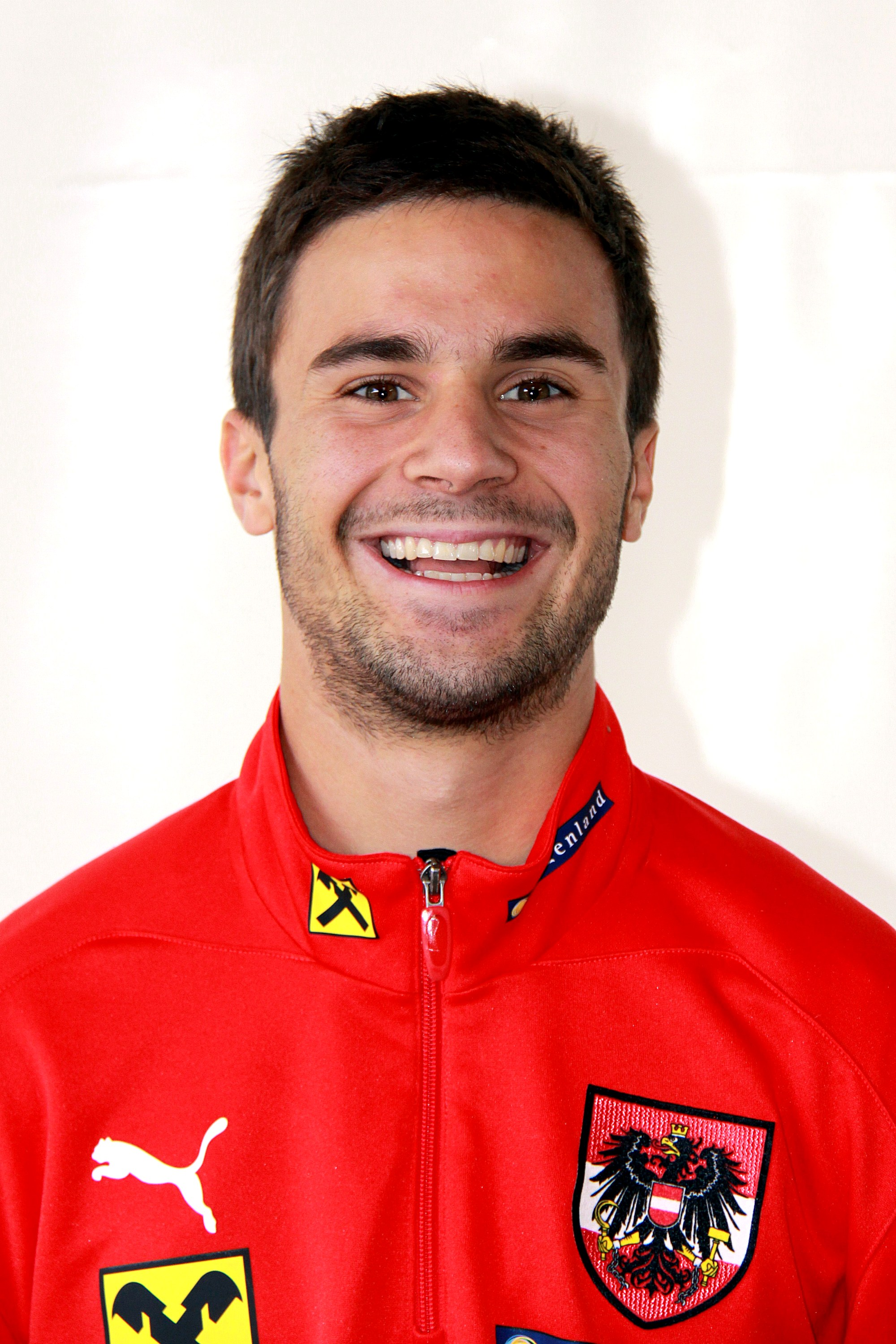

Personal information
- Date of birth: 4 February 1990 (age 36)
- Place of birth: Wagna, Austria
- Height: 1.74 m (5 ft 9 in)
- Positions: Midfielder; forward

Team information
- Current team: Grazer AK (director of football)

Senior career*
| Years | Team | Apps | (Gls) |
| 2006–2008 | Grazer AK | 26 | (11) |
| 2008–2011 | Frosinone Calcio | 8 | (1) |
| 2010 | → Sampdoria (loan) | 0 | (0) |
| 2010–2011 | → Kapfenberger SV (loan) | 35 | (4) |
| 2011–2014 | Kapfenberger SV | 61 | (12) |
| 2013–2014 | → SV Grödig (loan) | 35 | (8) |
| 2014–2017 | SV Ried | 100 | (11) |
| 2017–2018 | ASK Voitsberg | | |
| 2018–2021 | Grazer AK | 14 | (1) |

Managerial career
- 2021–: Grazer AK (director of football)
- 2021: Grazer AK (caretaker)
- * Club domestic league appearances and goals

Dieter Elsneg (born 4 February 1990) is an Austrian professional football official and a former player who played as a midfielder or forward. Now after one year of vocational adjustment he became the new sporting director of Grazer AK.
