= 2015–16 Austrian Football Bundesliga =

104th season of top-tier football league in Austria

Austrian Bundesliga
- Season: 2015–16
- Dates: 25 July 2015 – 15 May 2016
- Champions: Red Bull Salzburg
- Relegated: Grödig
- Champions League: Red Bull Salzburg
- Europa League: Rapid Wien; Austria Wien; Admira Wacker Mödling
- Matches: 180
- Goals: 477 (2.65 per match)
- Top goalscorer: Jonathan Soriano (21)
- Biggest home win: Salzburg 8–0 Admira (17 October 2015)
- Biggest away win: Mattersburg 0-9 Austria (23 April 2016)
- Highest scoring: Mattersburg 0-9 Austria (23 April 2016)
- Longest winning run: Austria (5 games); Rapid (5 games)
- Longest unbeaten run: Red Bull (14 games)
- Longest winless run: Grödig (11 games)
- Longest losing run: Altach (4 games); Grödig (4 games)
- All statistics correct as of 18 May 2016.

The 2015–16 Austrian Football Bundesliga was the 104th season of top-tier football in Austria. Red Bull Salzburg were the defending champions.

== Division ==
The Bundesliga is the highest division in Austrian football. Which took place in the 2015/16 season for the 42nd time and determined the 104. Austrian soccer champion. The main sponsor was, as for the two previous years, the sports betting company Tipico, which is the reason why the official league name is Tipico Bundesliga.

Salzburg and Vienna each had two teams, Burgenland, Carinthia, Lower Austria, Upper Austria, Styria and Vorarlberg each had one. Tyrol was the only state without a team in Austria's highest league. In the 2014/15 season, the SC Wiener Neustadt went down into the First League, while the SV Mattersburg moved up.

The TV provider Sky Germany AG had the rights to show all Bundesliga games in full-length which were broadcast on the Sky sport Austria pay television channel. The channel broadcast all games as conference calls and individually. In addition, the ORF had the rights to broadcast a game of their choice, which was as a single match labeled the "top match of the round" – which usually took place Sundays, when the midweek rounds were on Wednesdays. This was not possible though in the last two rounds where all games had to be broadcast simultaneously. In addition, the ORF was allowed to show a 45-minute summary of the remaining four games of each round.

== Mode ==
In the 2015/16 season were ten clubs in 36 rounds against each other, as in previous years. Each team played twice at home and twice away against every other team.

Because the European Cup results of the Austrian team in the 2014–15 season, they fell at the end of the season back to 16th place of the UEFA coefficient. Therefore, the Bundesliga and the ÖFB Cup played only one starting position for the Champions League and two in the Europa League in the 2015/16 season. The champions of the Bundesliga is entitled to participate in the qualification for the UEFA Champions League and rises to the second qualifying round: The cup winners, runners-up and third place in the Bundesliga games, play in the qualification for the UEFA Europa League and depending on the results, get in the third, second or first round in the competition. The initial rounds can shift due to the selection of players in favor of the Austria national team, from the defending champion of the Champions League or Europa League. After the Cup victory went to FC Red Bull Salzburg, who qualified for the Champions League, the fourth international position fell to the fourth place team in the Bundesliga. Coincidentally, this was also the Cup finalist, FC Admira Wacker Mödling. The last placed team in the top division, the Bundesliga, SV Grödig, should have relegated to the First League, but withdrew from the professional sector at the end of the season.

== Teams ==
SV Mattersburg, the 2014–15 First League champion, returned to the top level two years after their relegation.

=== Stadia and locations ===
Location of teams in the 2015–16 Austrian Football Bundesliga

Team	Location	Venue	Capacity
Admira Wacker Mödling	Maria Enzersdorf	BSFZ-Arena	10,800
Austria Wien	Vienna	Generali Arena	12,639
Grödig	Grödig	DAS.GOLDBERG Stadion	4,036
Rapid Wien	Vienna	Ernst-Happel-Stadion	50,865
Red Bull Salzburg	Wals-Siezenheim	Red Bull Arena	30,188
Rheindorf Altach	Altach	Cashpoint Arena	8,500
SV Ried	Ried im Innkreis	Keine Sorgen Arena	7,334
Sturm Graz	Graz	UPC-Arena	15,323
SV Mattersburg	Mattersburg	Pappelstadion	17,100
Wolfsberger AC	Wolfsberg	Lavanttal-Arena	7,300

=== Personnel and kits ===
Team	Chairman	Manager	Manufacturer	Sponsors
Admira Wacker	(Austria) Philip Thonhauser	(Austria) Ernst Baumeister	Nike	Flyeralarm
SCR Altach	(Austria) Johannes Engl	(Austria) Damir Canadi	Jako	Cashpoint
Austria Wien	(Austria) Wolfgang Katzian	(Germany) Thorsten Fink	Nike	Verbund
SV Grödig	(Austria) Anton Haas	(Austria) Peter Schöttel	Nike	Interwetten
Rapid Wien	(Austria) Michael Krammer	(Austria) Zoran Barisic	adidas	Wien Energie
SV Ried	(Austria) Johann Willminger	(Austria) Paul Gludovatz	hummel	Josko
RB Salzburg	(Austria) Rudolf Theierl	(Spain) Óscar García	Nike	Red Bull
Sturm Graz	(Austria) Christian Jauk	(Germany) Franco Foda	Lotto	Puntigamer
SV Mattersburg	(Austria) Martin Pucher	(Austria) Ivica Vastić	Umbro	Bauwelt Koch
Wolfsberger AC	(Austria) Dietmar Riegler	(Austria) Heimo Pfeifenberger	Jako	RZ Pellets

== League table ==
Pos	Team	Pld	W	D	L	GF	GA	GD	Pts	Qualification or relegation
1	Red Bull Salzburg (C)	36	21	11	4	71	33	+38	74	Qualification for the Champions League second qualifying round
2	Rapid Wien	36	20	5	11	66	42	+24	65	Qualification for the Europa League third qualifying round
3	Austria Wien	36	17	8	11	65	48	+17	59	Qualification for the Europa League second qualifying round
4	Admira Wacker Mödling	36	13	11	12	45	51	−6	50	Qualification for the Europa League first qualifying round
5	Sturm Graz	36	12	12	12	40	40	0	48	
6	Wolfsberger AC	36	11	10	15	33	36	−3	43	
7	Ried	36	11	9	16	36	52	−16	42	
8	Rheindorf Altach	36	11	7	18	39	49	−10	40	
9	Mattersburg	36	10	9	17	40	70	−30	39	
10	Grödig (R)	36	9	8	19	42	56	−14	35	Withdrawal to regional leagues (Note: Grödig would have been relegated to the Austrian Football First League, but withdrew their application for First League licence.)

Source: weltfussball.de (in German), Soccerway
Rules for classification: 1) Points; 2) Less matches awarded against; 3) Goal difference; 4) Goals scored; 5) Matches won; 6) Away matches won; 7) Head-to-head points; 8) Head-to-head goal difference; 9) Head-to-head goals scored.
(C) Champions; (R) Relegated

== Results ==
=== First half of season ===
Home \ Away	ADM	AWI	ALT	GRÖ	RWI	RBS	RIE	STU	MAT	WOL
Admira Wacker Mödling		0–1	1–1	0–0	2–1	2–2	3–1	0–1	2–1	1–0
Austria Wien	1–1		3–1	2–1	2–5	1–1	1–1	2–1	5–1	1–0
Rheindorf Altach	1–2	1–2		1–0	2–0	1–0	1–3	0–1	3–1	2–1
Grödig	2–3	2–2	2–1		2–1	1–1	4–1	3–0	1–1	1–0
Rapid Wien	2–0	1–2	3–1	3–0		1–2	3–0	2–1	2–4	2–1
Red Bull Salzburg	8–0	2–2	2–0	4–2	1–2		2–1	3–1	4–2	1–1
Ried	1–1	4–2	2–0	1–0	0–1	1–4		1–0	0–1	0–0
Sturm Graz	1–1	2–0	3–1	1–1	2–2	2–3	3–2		0–0	2–0
Mattersburg	0–4	1–2	2–1	0–2	1–6	2–1	4–1	2–0		1–0
Wolfsberger AC	4–0	0–2	0–2	3–2	2–1	1–1	1–1	0–2	2–1	

Source: weltfussball.de (in German)
Legend: Blue = home team win; Yellow = draw; Red = away team win.

=== Second half of season ===
Home \ Away	ADM	AWI	ALT	GRÖ	RWI	RBS	RIE	STU	MAT	WOL
Admira Wacker Mödling		0–3	2–1	1–1	1–3	1–2	0–0	1–0	1–1	0–2
Austria Wien	3–1		1–2	0–2	0–3	0–2	3–1	3–0	2–2	0–0
Rheindorf Altach	1–2	2–0		1–0	0–0	1–3	0–0	2–2	1–2	1–1
Grödig	2–2	0–1	0–3		2–0	1–2	2–2	1–3	0–1	0–1
Rapid Wien	0–4	1–0	1–1	3–2		1–1	2–1	2–0	3–0	3–0
Red Bull Salzburg	1–0	4–1	2–0	3–0	2–0		2–1	1–1	2–1	1–0
Ried	1–0	0–5	0–2	2–0	1–0	1–0		0–1	1–0	1–0
Sturm Graz	1–1	1–1	4–1	2–0	0–2	0–0	0–0		1–1	1–0
Mattersburg	0–3	0–9	0–0	2–3	0–2	0–0	3–3	1–0		1–1
Wolfsberger AC	1–2	2–0	1–0	2–0	2–2	1–1	1–0	0–0	2–0	

Source: weltfussball.de (in German)
Legend: Blue = home team win; Yellow = draw; Red = away team win.

== Season statistics ==
=== Top goalscorers ===
As of 15 May 2016.

Rank	Scorer	Club	Goals
1	(Spain) Jonathan Soriano	Red Bull Salzburg	21
2	(Austria) Alexander Gorgon	Austria Wien	19
3	(Nigeria) Olarenwaju Kayode	Austria Wien	13
4	(Guinea) Naby Keïta	Red Bull Salzburg	12
5	(Austria) Johannes Aigner	SC Rheindorf Altach	10
5	(Japan) Takumi Minamino	Red Bull Salzburg	10
5	(Brazil) Lucas Venuto	SV Grödig/Austria Wien	10
8	(Austria) Alexander Grünwald	Austria Wien	9
8	(Burkina Faso) Issiaka Ouédraogo	Wolfsberger AC	9
10	(Austria) Dieter Elsneg	SV Ried	8
10	(Austria) Roman Kienast	Sturm Graz	8
10	(Austria) Markus Pink	SV Mattersburg	8
10	(Austria) Stefan Schwab	Rapid Wien	8

=== Positions by round ===
The table lists the positions of teams after each week of matches. In order to preserve chronological evolvements, any postponed matches are not included in the round at which they were originally scheduled, but added to the full round they were played immediately afterwards. For example, if a match is scheduled for matchday 13, but then postponed and played between days 16 and 17, it will be added to the standings for day 16.

Team \ Round	1	2	3	4	5	6	7	8	9	10	11	12	13	14	15	16	17	18	19	20	21	22	23	24	25	26	27	28	29	30	31	32	33	34	35	36
Red Bull Salzburg	7	9	7	7	5	6	5	5	4	2	2	1	1	2	2	2	1	2	2	1	1	1	1	1	2	1	1	1	1	1	1	1	1	1	1	1
Rapid Wien	1	1	1	1	1	1	1	2	1	1	1	3	3	3	3	3	3	3	3	3	3	2	2	2	1	2	2	2	2	2	2	2	2	2	2	2
Austria Wien	2	1	2	4	3	3	2	3	5	3	3	2	2	1	1	1	2	1	1	2	2	3	3	3	3	3	3	3	3	3	3	3	3	3	3	3
Admira Wacker Mödling	5	3	4	3	2	2	3	1	2	4	4	4	6	4	5	5	5	4	4	5	5	5	5	5	5	5	4	4	4	4	5	5	4	5	4	4
Sturm Graz	5	6	6	2	4	4	6	7	6	6	6	6	5	6	4	4	4	5	5	4	4	4	4	4	4	4	6	6	5	5	4	4	5	4	5	5
Wolfsberger AC	9	7	8	9	8	8	9	10	10	10	10	9	9	10	9	10	10	10	9	10	10	10	10	9	8	7	7	8	8	7	8	6	6	6	6	6
Ried	10	8	9	10	10	9	10	9	9	9	9	10	10	9	10	9	9	9	10	9	9	8	7	7	7	8	9	9	9	9	9	9	7	7	7	7
Rheindorf Altach	7	10	10	8	9	10	8	6	8	7	8	8	8	8	8	8	8	8	8	6	6	7	8	8	9	9	8	7	7	8	7	8	9	8	8	8
Mattersburg	3	5	3	5	6	5	4	4	3	5	5	5	4	5	6	6	6	7	6	7	7	6	6	6	6	6	5	5	6	6	6	7	8	9	9	9
Grödig	3	3	4	6	7	7	7	8	7	8	7	7	7	7	7	7	7	6	7	8	8	9	9	10	10	10	10	10	10	10	10	10	10	10	10	10

Leader / 2016–17 UEFA Champions League second qualifying round
2016–17 UEFA Europa League second qualifying round
2016–17 UEFA Europa League first qualifying round
Relegation to 2016–17 First League

== Awards ==
=== Annual awards ===
==== Player of the Year ====
The Player of the Year awarded to (Guinea) Naby Keïta (Red Bull Salzburg)

==== Top goalscorer ====
The Top goalscorer of the Year awarded to (Spain) Jonathan Soriano (Red Bull Salzburg)

==== Goalkeeper of the Year ====
The Goalkeeper of the Year awarded to (Germany) Alexander Walke (Red Bull Salzburg)

=== Team of the Year ===

Team of the Year
Goalkeeper	(Austria) Alexander Walke (Red Bull Salzburg)			
Defence	(Austria) Stefan Stangl (Rapid Wien)	(Croatia) Duje Ćaleta-Car (Red Bull Salzburg)	(Austria) Christoph Schösswendter (Admira Wacker)	(Switzerland) Christian Schwegler (Red Bull Salzburg)
Midfield	(Austria) Stefan Schwab (Rapid Wien)	(Guinea) Naby Keïta (Red Bull Salzburg)	(Austria) Florian Kainz (Rapid Wien)	Alexander Gorgon (Austria Wien)
Attack	(Spain) Jonatan Soriano (Red Bull Salzburg)		(Nigeria) Olarenwaju Kayode (Austria Wien)	

== Attendances ==
Pos	Team	Total	High	Low	Average	Change
1	Rapid Wien	303,484	31,700	12,300	16,860	+0.5%
2	Sturm Graz	152,910	14,876	5,129	8,495	−16.2%
3	Red Bull Salzburg	152,694	16,405	3,755	8,483	−15.3%
4	Austria Wien	129,636	12,500	5,493	7,202	+6.7%
5	Mattersburg	88,495	9,645	2,605	4,916	+36.9%^{1}
6	Rheindorf Altach	86,018	7,268	3,071	4,779	−10.8%
7	Ried	72,576	5,541	2,978	4,032	−2.3%
8	Wolfsberger AC	64,019	5,933	2,692	3,557	−32.5%
9	Admira Wacker Mödling	51,293	5,487	1,604	2,850	−10.0%
10	Grödig	28,199	2,845	1,028	1,567	−5.0%
	League total	1,129,324	31,700	1,142	6,274	−4.6%

Updated to games played on 22 May 2016
Source: bundesliga.at
Notes:
1: Team played last season in Erste Liga
