= List of Austrian football transfers winter 2016–17 =

This is a list of Austrian football transfers in the 2016–17 winter transfer window. Only transfers of the Austrian Football Bundesliga and Austrian Football First League are listed.

== Austrian Football Bundesliga ==
Note: Flags indicate national team as has been defined under FIFA eligibility rules. Players may hold more than one non-FIFA nationality.

=== FC Red Bull Salzburg ===
In:

No.	Pos.	Nation	Player
—	MF	CRO	Ante Roguljić (loan return from FC Admira Wacker Mödling)
—	FW	GHA	David Atanga (loan return from (Germany) 1. FC Heidenheim)
—	FW	SUI	Dimitri Oberlin (loan return from SC Rheindorf Altach)

Out:

No.	Pos.	Nation	Player
—	DF	FRA	Dayot Upamecano (to (Germany) RB Leipzig)
—	GK	BRA	Airton (on loan to (Brazil) Red Bull Brasil)
—	DF	GER	Reinhold Yabo (on loan to (Germany) Arminia Bielefeld)
—	FW	PER	Yordy Reyna (to (Canada) Vancouver Whitecaps FC)
—	FW	GHA	David Atanga (on loan to SV Mattersburg)
—	MF	CRO	Ante Roguljić (on loan to FC Wacker Innsbruck)
—	FW	NOR	Fredrik Gulbrandsen (on loan to (United States) New York Red Bulls)
—	FW	ESP	Jonathan Soriano (to (China) Beijing Sinobo Guoan F.C.)

=== SK Rapid Wien ===
In:

No.	Pos.	Nation	Player

Out:

No.	Pos.	Nation	Player
—	FW	AUT	Maximilian Entrup (on loan to SKN St. Pölten)
—	GK	AUT	Paul Gartler (on loan to Kapfenberger SV)

=== FK Austria Wien ===
In:

No.	Pos.	Nation	Player
—	DF	CRO	Marko Pejić (from (Croatia) HNK Hajduk Split)

Out:

No.	Pos.	Nation	Player
—	DF	AUT	Richard Windbichler (to (South Korea) Ulsan Hyundai FC)
—	DF	CZE	Patrizio Stronati (on loan to (Czech Republic) FK Mladá Boleslav)

=== FC Admira Wacker Mödling ===
In:

No.	Pos.	Nation	Player

Out:

No.	Pos.	Nation	Player
—	MF	CRO	Ante Roguljić (loan return to Red Bull Salzburg)
—	MF	AUT	Markus Blutsch (loan return to LASK Linz)

=== SK Sturm Graz ===
In:

No.	Pos.	Nation	Player
—	MF	NOR	Martin Ovenstad (from (Norway) Strømsgodset Toppfotball)
—	MF	TUR	Barış Atik (on loan from (Germany) TSG 1899 Hoffenheim)
—	FW	TUN	Seifedin Chabbi (from (Switzerland) FC St. Gallen)

Out:

No.	Pos.	Nation	Player
—	MF	SRB	Uroš Matić (to (Denmark) F.C. Copenhagen)
—	FW	NGA	Bright Edomwonyi (to (Turkey) Çaykur Rizespor)

=== Wolfsberger AC ===
In:

No.	Pos.	Nation	Player
—	FW	JAM	Dever Orgill (from (Finland) IFK Mariehamn)
—	MF	AUT	Mario Leitgeb (from (Switzerland) FC St. Gallen)

Out:

No.	Pos.	Nation	Player
—	DF	AUT	Michael Berger (to Floridsdorfer AC)

=== SV Ried ===
In:

No.	Pos.	Nation	Player

Out:

No.	Pos.	Nation	Player
—	MF	AUT	Kevin Brandstätter (on loan to FC Blau-Weiß Linz)
—	GK	AUT	Markus Schöller (to (Germany) SV Schalding-Heining)

=== SC Rheindorf Altach ===
In:

No.	Pos.	Nation	Player
—	DF	AUT	Bernhard Janeczek (from (Romania) FC Dinamo București)

Out:

No.	Pos.	Nation	Player
—	FW	SUI	Dimitri Oberlin (loan return to Red Bull Salzburg)
—	DF	ESP	César Ortiz (to SV Mattersburg)

=== SV Mattersburg ===
In:

No.	Pos.	Nation	Player
—	FW	GHA	David Atanga (on loan from Red Bull Salzburg)
—	DF	ESP	César Ortiz (from SC Rheindorf Altach)
—	FW	AUT	Stefan Maierhofer (unattached)

Out:

No.	Pos.	Nation	Player

=== SKN St. Pölten ===
In:

No.	Pos.	Nation	Player
—	DF	SEN	Babacar Diallo (from (Finland) Kuopion Palloseura)
—	MF	SEN	Cheikhou Dieng (on loan from (Turkey) İstanbul Başakşehir F.K.)
—	MF	AUT	Ümit Korkmaz (unattached)
—	FW	AUT	Maximilian Entrup (on loan from SK Rapid Wien)
—	DF	BIH	Adi Mehremić (from (Slovakia) Spartak Myjava)
—	FW	GUI	Lonsana Doumbouya (from (Scotland) Inverness Caledonian Thistle F.C.)

Out:

No.	Pos.	Nation	Player
—	FW	NED	Jeroen Lumu (to (Turkey) Samsunspor)
—	GK	AUT	Bartoloměj Kuru (to ASK Bruck/Leitha)
—	MF	AUT	Florian Mader (to WSG Wattens)
—	FW	ESP	Daniel Lucas Segovia (to (Azerbaijan) Neftçi PFK)
—	FW	GUI	Alhassane Keita (to (Portugal) C.S. Marítimo)
—	DF	NED	Kai Heerings (to (Germany) FC 08 Homburg)
—	DF	AUT	Andreas Dober (to Rapid Wien II)

== Austrian Football First League ==
=== LASK Linz ===
In:

No.	Pos.	Nation	Player
—	MF	GER	Alexander Riemann (from FC Wacker Innsbruck)
—	FW	SVK	Tomáš Malec (loan return from (Norway) Lillestrøm SK)
—	MF	AUT	Markus Blutsch (loan return from FC Admira Wacker Mödling)
—	FW	CRO	Antonio Đurić (from (Croatia) Dinamo Zagreb II)

Out:

No.	Pos.	Nation	Player
—	MF	AUT	Mario Reiter (to ASKÖ Oedt)
—	MF	BRA	Juninho (released)
—	MF	AUT	Markus Blutsch (on loan to FC Blau-Weiß Linz)
—	FW	CRO	Antonio Đurić (on loan to ATSV Stadl-Paura)

=== FC Wacker Innsbruck ===
In:

No.	Pos.	Nation	Player
—	MF	CRO	Ante Roguljić (on loan from Red Bull Salzburg)
—	MF	AUT	Felipe Dorta (on loan from LASK Linz Juniors)

Out:

No.	Pos.	Nation	Player
—	MF	GER	Alexander Riemann (to LASK Linz)
—	MF	AUT	Rami Tekir (to FC Liefering)
—	MF	AUT	Michael Augustin (on loan to SC Schwaz)

=== FC Liefering ===
In:

No.	Pos.	Nation	Player
—	MF	AUT	Rami Tekir (from FC Wacker Innsbruck)
—	DF	BRA	Urias (on loan from (Brazil) Red Bull Brasil)
—	FW	ZAM	Patson Daka (on loan from (Zambia) Kafue Celtic FC)
—	MF	MLI	Mamby Koita (from (Mali) USC Kita)
—	DF	BIH	Bojan Lugonja (from LASK Linz Juniors)

Out:

No.	Pos.	Nation	Player
—	DF	GER	Daniel Raischl (to Floridsdorfer AC)
—	DF	AUT	David Gugganig (on loan to WSG Wattens)
—	DF	AUT	Michael Switil (on loan to SV Grödig)
—	MF	MLI	Mamby Koita (on loan to SV Grödig)

=== SC Austria Lustenau ===
In:

No.	Pos.	Nation	Player
—	DF	TUR	Firat Tuncer (unattached)
—	MF	BRA	João Pedro (from (Brazil) Coimbra Esporte Clube)

Out:

No.	Pos.	Nation	Player
—	FW	GHA	Raphael Dwamena (to (Switzerland) FC Zürich)
—	DF	AUT	Benjamin Kaufmann (to SV Seekirchen)

=== Kapfenberger SV ===
In:

No.	Pos.	Nation	Player
—	GK	AUT	Paul Gartler (on loan from SK Rapid Wien)
—	MF	AUT	Edvin Hodzic (from SK Austria Klagenfurt)

Out:

No.	Pos.	Nation	Player
—	DF	ESP	Dennis Nieblas (to C.D. River Ecuador)
—	FW	ESP	Sergi Arimany (to (Spain) SD Leioa)
—	MF	BIH	Marko Perišić (released)
—	FW	SVK	Patrik Klačan (released)
—	DF	AUT	Danijel Colovic (to SV Andritz)
—	DF	RUS	Naim Sharifi (released)

=== SC Wiener Neustadt ===
In:

No.	Pos.	Nation	Player
—	FW	AUT	Lukas Fridrikas (from SV Seekirchen)

Out:

No.	Pos.	Nation	Player

=== Floridsdorfer AC ===
In:

No.	Pos.	Nation	Player
—	DF	AUT	Michael Berger (from Wolfsberger AC)
—	DF	GER	Daniel Raischl (from FC Liefering)
—	FW	SLE	George Davies (on loan from (Germany) SpVgg Greuther Fürth)
—	MF	AUT	Robert Völkl (from (Germany) Stuttgarter Kickers)
—	MF	AUT	Kevin Hinterberger (from ATSV Stadl-Paura)

Out:

No.	Pos.	Nation	Player
—	GK	AUT	Nikolai Vambersky (on loan to 1. Simmeringer SC)
—	DF	AUT	Matthias Hager (on loan to SV Schwechat)
—	MF	AUT	Stefan Krickl (on loan to SV Schwechat)
—	MF	AUT	Edvin Orascanin (released)
—	MF	AUT	Lukas Grill (to SC Mannsdorf)
—	DF	AUT	Goran Kreso (to ASK Ebreichsdorf)

=== SV Horn ===
In:

No.	Pos.	Nation	Player
—	GK	CRO	Miro Varvodić (unattached)
—	MF	EST	Ilja Antonov (from (Estonia) FC Levadia Tallinn)
—	MF	GER	Vesel Limaj (from (Germany) Hamburger SV II)

Out:

No.	Pos.	Nation	Player
—	MF	JPN	Kenta Kawanaka (on loan to SC Mannsdorf)
—	GK	AUT	Philip Petermann (to SC Mannsdorf)
—	GK	JPN	Shūichi Gonda (loan return to (Japan) FC Tokyo)

=== FC Blau-Weiß Linz ===
In:

No.	Pos.	Nation	Player
—	MF	AUT	Kevin Brandstätter (on loan from SV Ried)
—	MF	GER	Christopher Mandiangu (from (Slovakia) MŠK Žilina)
—	MF	AUT	Markus Blutsch (on loan from LASK Linz)

Out:

No.	Pos.	Nation	Player
—	MF	AUT	Florian Krennmayr (to Hertha Wels)
—	DF	AUT	Simon Abraham (to Hertha Wels)
—	MF	GER	Fabian Schnabel (on loan to Union St. Florian)

=== WSG Wattens ===
In:

No.	Pos.	Nation	Player
—	MF	AUT	Florian Mader (from SKN St. Pölten)
—	DF	AUT	David Gugganig (on loan from FC Liefering)

Out:

No.	Pos.	Nation	Player
—	MF	PAK	Khurram Shazad (released)

== See also ==
- 2016–17 Austrian Football Bundesliga
- 2016–17 Austrian Football First League
