= 2014–15 FK Austria Wien season =

Austria Wien
2014-15 season
- Head Coach: Gerald Baumgartner (to 22 March 2015); Andreas Ogris (from 22 March 2015)
- Stadium: Generali-Arena; Vienna, Austria
- Bundesliga: 7th
- Austrian Cup: Runners-up
- Top goalscorer: League: Alexander Gorgon; Omer Damari (8 each); All: Omer Damari (10 goals)

The 2014–15 FK Austria Wien season was the 103rd season in club history. The club participated in the Bundesliga and the Austrian Cup, where they reached the final and lost to Red Bull Salzburg.

== Background ==
=== Background information ===
Austria Wien finished the 2013–14 season in fourth place and failed to qualify for a spot in Europe. The club would have gone into the Europa League if they had maintained third–place. The club received their licence on 30 April 2014. Austria Wien signed Marco Meilinger, Mario Leitgeb, and Jens Stryger Larsen. Rubin Okotie, Tamás Priskin, and Martin Harrer returned from loan spells. However, Okotie eventually transferred to 1860 München. Pascal Grünwald, Marko Stanković, Tomáš Jun, Emir Dilaver, Kaja Rogulj, Lukas Rotpuller, Thomas Murg, and Philipp Hosiner left the club. The clubstarted pre–season on 10 June. They were without Heinz Lindner and Markus Suttner, who were still on vacation, and James Holland, who is on the squad for Australia at the FIFA World Cup, and Rubin Okotie, who was missing for "another reason."

During the 2013–14 season, Nenad Bjelica was sacked as head coach. Herbert Gager was named interim head coach. However, he was sacked after the season and didn't get the permanent job. The club wanted Adi Hütter to become head coach. But he eventually was hired by Red Bull Salzburg to become their new head coach. Then they had talks with Manfred Schmid about the vacant head coach's job. However, 1. FC Köln refused to release him. Köln had demanded a €400,000 transfer fee. Gerald Baumgartner was announced as the new head coach on 27 May. He received a two–year contract with an option year. He had been head coach of St. Pölten. Renato Gligoroski was named the assistant coach on 6 June. He had been Baumgartner's assistant at St. Pölten.

=== Transfers ===
==== In ====
No.	Pos.	Name	Age	EU	Moving from	Type	Transfer Window	Contract ends	Transfer fee	Ref.
	MF	Marco Meilinger	22	Yes	Red Bull Salzburg	End of contract	Summer	2016^{1}	Undesclosed^{2}	
	FW	Rubin Okotie		Yes	SønderjyskE	Loan return	Summer	—	—	
	FW	Tamás Priskin		Yes	Maccabi Haifa	Loan return	Summer	—	—	
	FW	Martin Harrer	22	Yes	Rheindorf Altach	Loan return	Summer	—	—	
	MF	Mario Leitgeb	26	Yes	Grödig	Transfer	Summer	2017	Undisclosed	
	DF	Jens Stryger Larsen	23	Yes	Nordsjælland	Transfer	Summer	2016	Undisclosed	
	FW	Omer Damari	25	No	Hapoel Tel Aviv	Transfer	Summer	2018	Undisclosed	
	DF	Lukas Rotpuller		Yes	Free Agent	—	Summer	2015^{1}	—	
16	FW	Philipp Zulechner		Yes	SC Freiburg	Loan	January	—	Undisclosed	
	FW	Ronivaldo	25	No	Kapfenberger SV	Transfer	January	2017	Undisclosed	
	MF	Raphael Holzhauser	21	Yes	VfB Stuttgart II	Transfer	January	2018	Undisclosed	
	DF	Patrizio Stronati	20	Yes	Baník Ostrava	Transfer	January	2018	Undisclosed	

==== Out ====
No.	Pos.	Name	Age	EU	Moving to	Type	Transfer Window	Transfer fee	Ref.
1	GK	Pascal Grünwald	31	Yes	Wacker Innsbruck	End of contract	Summer	Free	
19	FW	Marko Stanković	28	Yes	Sturm Graz	End of contract	Summer	Free	
11	FW	Tomáš Jun	31	Yes		End of contract	Summer	Free	
	DF	Emir Dilaver	23	Yes		End of contract	Summer	Free	
	DF	Kaja Rogulj	28	Yes	Luzern	End of contract	Summer	Free	
	DF	Lukas Rotpuller		Yes		End of contract	Summer	Free	
	MF	Thomas Murg		Yes	Ried	Transfer	Summer	Undisclosed	
	FW	Philipp Hosiner	25	Yes	Stade Rennais	Transfer	Summer	Undisclosed	
	FW	Rubin Okotie	27	Yes	1860 München	Transfer	Summer	Undisclosed	
	FW	Omer Damari	25	No	RB Leipzig	Transfer	January	Undisclosed	

== Bundesliga ==
=== Bundesliga review ===
==== Matchdays 1–9 ====
The opening match of the Bundesliga season on 20 July for Austria Wien against Grödig ended in a 1–1 draw. Daniel Schütz gave Grödig the lead prior to Ola Kamara equalising for Austria in stoppage time. There were nine yellow cards in the match. Austria finished the matchday tied for fifth with Grödig. Then on matchday two, on 26 July, Austria lost to Wolfsberg 4–0 with goals from Christopher Wernitznig, Nemanja Rnić, Jacobo Ynclán from the penalty spot, and Sílvio. Vanče Šikov was sent–off in the sixth minute. Austria finished the matchday in seventh place. Austria started August with a 0–0 draw against Altach on matchday three on 2 August. Austria remained winless and dropped down to eighth place, two places above the relegation zone. Then Austria and Wiener Neustadt battled to a 2–2 draw on matchday four on 9 August. Austria got goals from Omer Damari and Alexander Grünwald from the penalty spot and Daniel Schöpf and Herbert Rauter scored for Wiener Neustadt. Damari only got his work permit the day before. Austria finished the matchday in ninth place. Again, on matchday five on 17 August, Austrias match ended in a draw. The match against Sturm Graz ended 1–1. Daniel Royer opened the scoring in the eighth minute for Austria. However, in the 52nd minute, David Schloffer equalized for Sturm. The result meant that Austria have failed to win any of their last eight matches and four of the last five matches between the two clubs have ended in the same scoreline. Austria remained in ninth place. The 310th Vienna derby ended in a 2–2 draw on matchday six on 24 August. Austria took the lead twice with a first-minute goal from Alexander Gorgon and a second–half penalty shot from Omer Damari. However, both Robert Berić and Stefan Schwab equalized for Rapid. Austria finished the matchday in eighth place. Austria continued their winless streak on matchday seven on 30 August when they lost 2–1 to Admira Wacker. Eldis Bajrami and Stephan Zwierschitz scored four minutes apart late in the first half to give Admira Wacker the lead. Alexander Grünwald scored early in the second half to pull a goal back. With the result, Austria remained the only team winless and dropped down to 10th and last place. Austria kicked–off September with a 3–1 victory over Ried on matchday eight on 13 September. Omer Damari scored two goals and Daniel Royer scored for Austria and Denis Thomalla scored for Ried. This is Austria's first win of the season. Austria finished the matchday in eighth place. Then, on matchday nine on 21 September, Austria defeated Red Bull Salzburg 3–2. Marco Meilinger, David de Paula, and Omer Damari scored for Austria and Alan scored for Red Bull Salzburg. This was Austria's first victory against Red Bull Salzburg in four years. Austria finished the matchday in seventh place.

==== Matchdays 10–18 ====
Then, on matchday 10 on 27 September, Austria's match against Grödig finished in a 0–0 draw. The only notable events in the match were the six yellow cards handed out. Austria finished the matchday in sixth place. To kick–off October, Austria lost 2–0 to Wolfsberg on matchday 11 on 4 October. Peter Žulj and Manuel Weber scored for Wolfsberg. Omer Damari didn't play due to Yom Kippur. The loss meant that Austria finished the matchday in sixth place and 15 points behind league leaders Wolfsberg. Then on matchday 12, on 18 October, the Austria–Altach matched finished in a 1–1 draw. Jens Stryger Larsen scored for Austria and Emanuel Schreiner scored for Altach. Markus Suttner injured in the first–half of the match. Austria finished the matchday in sixth place. Then on 25 October, on matchday 13, Austria won their third match of the league season by defeating Wiener Neustadt 2–0 with goals from Daniel Royer and Alexander Grünwald. Tarkan Serbest made his debut for Austria in the starting 11. Austria finished the matchday tied for fifth with Sturm Graz. Austria started November with a 3–0 loss to Sturm Graz with a goal from Marko Stanković and two goals from Marco Djuricin on matchday 14, on 1 November. Stanković opened the scoring in the 15th minute. Then Djuricin added two more goals in the 42nd and 54th minutes. Austria picked up four yellow cards in the match. Austria finished the matchday in seventh place. Then on matchday 15, on 9 November, Austria defeated Rapid Wien 3–2 in the 311th Vienna derby. Austria took a 3–0 lead through Omer Damari brace in the 23rd minute and 40th minute and a Daniel Royer goal in the 78th minute. But Rapid Wien got two goals late in the match when Deni Alar scored in the 83rd minute and Robert Berić scored in stoppage time. Austria finished the match in sixth place. On 22 November, on matchday 16, Austria defeated Admira Wacker 4–0 with two goals from Alexander Gorgon and a goal each from Omer Damari and Vanče Šikov. Damari opened the scoring in the 61st minute after Richard Windbichler denied Austria a clear goalscoring opportunity. Windbichler received a red card for the foul. Royer scored seven minutes later. Then Gorgon added two goals in the 71st and 82nd minutes. Austria finished the matchday in sixth place. On matchday 17, on 29 November, Austria and Ried played to a 1–1 draw. Alexander Gorgan scored a seventh-minute goal for Austria and Toni Vastić scored in stoppage time to equalize for Ried. Thomas Salamon was sent–off for a second yellow card in the 82nd minute bringing Austria down to 10 men. Austria finished the matchday in sixth place. On matchday 18, on 6 December, Red Bull Salzburg defeated Austria 4–2. Austria took a 2–0 lead with a third-minute goal from Alexander Gorgon and a 21st-minute goal from Alexander Grünwald. Then in the second half, Red Bull Salzburg scored four goals. Alan scored in the 52nd, 58th, and 60th minutes to earn himself a hat-trick. Marcel Sabitzer scored the fourth goal in the 68th minute. Austria finished the matchday in seventh place.

==== Matchdays 19–27 ====
On matchday 19, on 13 December, Austria defeated Grödig 1–0 with a goal from Marko Kvasina. Kvasina scored in the 77th minute after coming on as a substitute 12 minutes earlier. Austria finished the matchday in sixth place. Austria started their winter break after the match. Austria returned from winter break with training on 5 January. On matchday 20, on 15 February, in Klagenfurt, Austria lost to Wolfsberg 1–0 with a ninth-minute goal from Michael Berger. Austria failed to convert two penalty shots in two shots. Austria finished the matchday in sixth place. On matchday 21, on 21 February, Austria defeated Altach 5–2. Austria got two goals from Alexander Gorgon and a goal each from Fabian Koch, Raphael Holzhauser, and Patrizio Stronati. Altach got two goals from Johannes Aigner. Austria took a 3–0 lead with Koch's opening goal in the 13th minute, Gorgon's goal 11 minutes later and Holzhauser's 54th-minute goal. Then Aigner scored in the 62nd and 63rd minutes to bring Altach within a goal. Then Gorgon got his second goal in the 69th minute. Stronati, who made his debut for the club, finished the scoring in the 86th minute tom make it 5–2. Austria finished the matchday in sixth place. On matchday 22, on 28 February, Wiener Neustadt defeated Austria 1–0 with a 34th-minute penalty from Conor O'Brien. Patrizio Stronati was sent–off on the play that led to the penalty shot. Austria finished the matchday in sixth place. On matchday 23, on 3 March, Sturm Graz defeated Austria 2–1. Alexander Grünwald scored for Austria and Simon Piesinger scored two goals for Sturm Graz. Grünwald gave Austria the lead in the 59th minute. Piesinger then equalized in the 70th minute and then gave Sturm Graz the lead in stoppage time in the second half. Austria finished the matchday in sixth place. In the 312th Vienna derby, on matchday 24, on 8 March, Austria defeated Rapid Wien 2–1. Lukas Rotpuller and Vanče Šikov scored for Austria and Steffen Hofmann scored for Rapid Wien. Hofmann gave Rapid Wien the lead in the 17th minute. Rotpuller scored in stoppage time in the first half and Šikov scored in the 84th minute to give Austria a 2–1 lead. Christian Ramsebner was sent–off for a second bookable offence. Austria finished the matchday in sixth place. The match, on matchday 25, on 14 March, finished in a 1–1 draw. Markus Suttner in the 82nd minute for Austria and Markus Katzer scored in the 85th minute for Admira Wacker. Austria finished the matchday in sixth place. On matchday 26, on 21 March, Ried defeated Austria 1–0 with an 80th-minute goal from Denis Thomalla. Austria finished the matchday in seventh place. The following day, Gerald Baumgartner was sacked and Andreas Ogris was appointed as head coach for the remainder of the season. On 4 April, on matchday 27, Austria lost 3–1 to Red Bull Salzburg. Red Bull Salzburg got two goals from Valentino Lazaro and a goal from Marcel Sabitzer. David de Paula scored for Austria. Sabitzer scored in the first minute to give Red Bull Salzburg a 1–0 lead. De Paula then equalized for Austria. Lazaro then gave Red Bull Salzburg the win with goals in the 23rd and 73rd minutes. Austria finished the matchday in seventh place.

==== Matchdays 28–36 ====
On matchday 28, on 11 April Austria and Grödig finished their match in a 1–1 draw. Austria finished the matchday in seventh place. On matchday 29, on 19 April, Austria and Wolfsberg finished in a 1–1 draw. Austria finished in seventh place. On matchday 30, on 26 April Austria lost to Rheindorf Altach 2–0. Austria finished the matchday in seventh place. On matchday 31, on 2 May, Austria defeated Wiener Neustadt 2–1. Austria finished the matchday in sixth place. On matchday 32, on 9 May, Austria and Sturm Graz finished their match in a 0–0 draw. Austria finished the matchday in seventh place. In the 313th Vienna derby, on matchday 34, Rapid Wien defeated Austria 4–1.

=== Bundesliga fixtures and results ===
Win Draw Loss

MD	Date Kick–off	H/A	Opponent	Res. F–A	Att.	Goalscorers and disciplined players		Table			Ref.
MD	Date Kick–off	H/A	Opponent	Res. F–A	Att.	Austria Wien	Opponent	Pos.	Pts.	GD	Ref.
1	20 July; 16:30	H	Grödig	1–1	7,295	de Paula (yellow card) 29'; Ramsebner (yellow card) 40'; Kienast (yellow card) 44'; Suttner (yellow card) 75'; Kamara 90+3'	Nutz (yellow card) 37'; Correa (yellow card) 40'; Schütz 54'; Martschinko (yellow card) 85'; Maak (yellow card) 88'; Djuric (yellow card) 90'	T5	1	0	
2	26 July; 16:30	A	Wolfsberg	0–4	5,000	Šikov (red card) 6'; Ramsebner (yellow card) 59'; Ortlechner (yellow card) 79'	Hüttenbrenner (yellow card) 6'; Wernitznig 15' (yellow card) 55'; Žulj (yellow card) 43'; Rnić 48'; Jacobo 68' (pen.); Sílvio 90+1'	7	1	–4	
3	2 August; 19:00	H	Rheindorf Altach	0–0	7,130	Holland (yellow card) 37'; Ramsebner (yellow card) 90'	Aigner (yellow card) 19'; Zwischenbrugger (yellow card) 58'; Prokopič (yellow card) 90'	8	2	–4	
4	8 August; 16:30	A	Wiener Neustadt	2–2	3,049	Gorgon (yellow card) 6'; Damari 9'; Leitgeb (yellow card) 25'; Grünwald 45' (pen.)	Ranftl (yellow card) 6'; Schöpf 24'; Rauter 30'; Deutschmann (yellow card) 82'; Pichlmann (yellow card) 90'	9	3	–4	
5	17 August; 16:30	A	Sturm Graz	1–1	9,229	Royer 8'; Larsen (yellow card) 23'; Leitgeb (yellow card) 37'	Schloffer 51' (yellow card) 56'; Beichler (yellow card) 53'; Hadžić (yellow card) 59'; Piesinger (yellow card) 79'	9	4	–4	
6	24 August; 16:30	H	Rapid Wien	2–2	11,900	Gorgon 1'; Damari 63' (pen.); Larsen (yellow card) 74'; Holland (yellow card) 83'	Berić 35'; Behrendt (yellow card) 35'; Sonnleitner (yellow card) 65'; Schwab 85'	8	5	–4	
7	30 August; 19:00	A	Admira Wacker	1–2	4,007	Grünwald 51'; Suttner (yellow card) 65'	Wessely (yellow card) 7'; Bajrami 43'; Zwierschitz 45+2'; Ouédraogo (yellow card) 49'; Lackner (yellow card) 79'; Katzer (yellow card) 88'; Schößwendter (yellow card) 90'	10	5	–5	
8	13 September; 18:30	H	Ried	3–1	7,082	Holland (yellow card) 13'; Damari 15', 56'; Royer 37'	Fröschl (yellow card) 11'; Thomalla 36'; Trauner (yellow card) 62' (yellow card) 73' (red card); Reifeltshammer (yellow card) 71'; Ziegl (yellow card) 90'	8	8	–3	
9	21 September; 16:30	A	Red Bull Salzburg	3–2	13,210	Mader (yellow card) 14'; Holland (yellow card) 27'; Meilinger 34' de Paula 38'; Damari 86'	Alan 31', 68'; Hinteregger (yellow card) 43' (yellow card) 49' (red card)	7	11	–2	
10	27 September; 18:30	A	Grödig	0–0	1,805	Larsen (yellow card) 39'; Grünwald 68'; Damari (yellow card) 88'; Leitgeb (yellow card) 90'	Brauer (yellow card) 28'; Strobl (yellow card) 73'	6	12	–2	
11	4 October; 16:00	H	Wolfsberg	0–2	7,633	Grünwald (yellow card) 19'	Žulj 28'; Wernitznig (yellow card) 40'; Weber (yellow card) 42' (goal) 90+4'; Standfest (yellow card) 62'; Ynclán (yellow card) 72'	6	12	–4	
12	18 October; 18:30	A	Rheindorf Altach	1-1	6,000	Larsen 5'; Rotpuller (yellow card) 42'	Schreiner 3'; Roth (yellow card) 41'; Prokopič (yellow card) 45+1'; Aigner (yellow card) 85'	6	13	-4	
13	25 October; 18:30	H	Wiener Neustadt	2–0	7,512	Royer 12'; Grünwald 24'	Mally (yellow card) 32'; Ali (yellow card) 60'	T5	16	–2	
14	1 November; 16:00	H	Sturm Graz	0–3	9,052	Šikov (yellow card) 14'; Grünwald (yellow card) 22'; Gorgon (yellow card) 61'; Meilinger (yellow card) 82'	Stanković 15'; Djuricin 42', 54'; Ehrenreich (yellow card) 58'; Offenbacher (yellow card) 61'	7	16	–5	
15	9 November	A	Rapid Wien	3–2	28,200	Damari 23', 40'; Salamon (yellow card) 39'; Larsen (yellow card) 45'; Royer 78'; Rotpuller (yellow card) 85'; Lindner (yellow card) 90+2'; Šikov (yellow card) 90+4'	Petsos (yellow card) 45'; Alar (yellow card) 49' (goal) 83'; Dibon (yellow card) 67'; Berić 90+2'	6	19	–4	
16	22 November	H	Admira Wacker	4–0	7,046	Leitgeb (yellow card) 45'; Damari 61' (pen.); Šikov (yellow card) 63'; Royer 68'; Gorgon 71', 82'	Lackner (yellow card) 20'; Windbichler (red card) 60'	6	22	0	
17	29 November; 16:00	A	Ried	1–1	4,000	Gorgon 7'; Grünwald (yellow card) 50'; Salamon (yellow card) 52' (yellow card) 82' (red card); Rotpuller (yellow card) 54'; Damari (yellow card) 90'	Vastić 90+3' (yellow card) 90+4'	6	23	0	
18	6 December; 16:00	H	Red Bull Salzburg	2–4	9,125	Gorgon 3'; Grünwald 21'; Royer (yellow card) 45'	Ilsanker (yellow card) 36'; Alan 52', 58', 60'; Sabitzer 68'	7	23	–2	
19	13 December; 18:30	H	Grödig	1–0	6,128	Suttner (yellow card) 73'; Kvasina 77'	Cabrera (yellow card) 40'; Völkl (yellow card) 45'; Reyna (yellow card) 50'; Strobl (yellow card) 68'	6	26	–1	
20	15 February; 15:30	A	Wolfsberg	0–1	4,400	Šikov (yellow card) 50'	Weber (yellow card) 5'; Berger 9'; Wernitznig (yellow card) 43'	6	26	–2	
21	21 February; 16:00	H	Rheindorf Altach	5–2	6,350	Koch 13'; Gorgon 24', 69'; Stronati (yellow card) 27' (goal) 86'; Rotpuller (yellow card) 40'; Suttner (yellow card) 51'; Holzhauser 54' (yellow card) 55'	Aigner 62', 63'	6	29	+1	
22	28 February; 18:30	A	Wiener Neustadt	0–1	3,230	Stronati (red card) 34'	O'Brien 34' (pen.); Denner (yellow card) 45+1'; Prettenthaler (yellow card) 77'	6	29	0	
23	3 March; 19:00	A	Sturm Graz	1–2	7,689	Grünwald 59'	Madl (yellow card) 42'; Piesinger 70', 90+5'	6	29	–1	
24	8 March; 16:30	H	Rapid Wien	2–1	11,000	Holland (yellow card) 33'; Ramsebner (yellow card) 38' (yellow card) 73' (red card); Rotpuller 45+4'; Šikov 84'	S. Hofmann 17'; Schwab (yellow card) 42'; Petsos (yellow card) 52'; Pavelic (yellow card) 83'; M. Hofmann (yellow card) 85'	6	32	0	
25	14 March; 16:00	A	Admira Wacker	1–1	3,970	Leitgeb (yellow card) 55'; Suttner 82'; Horvath (yellow card) 88'; Rotpuller (yellow card) 90'	Ebner (yellow card) 44'; Katzer (yellow card) 66' (goal) 85'	6	33	0	
26	21 March; 16:00	H	Ried	0–1	6,155	Šikov (yellow card) 26' de Paula (yellow card) 57'; Royer (yellow card) 82'	Thomalla 80'	7	33	–3	
27	4 April; 16:00	A	Red Bull Salzburg	1–3	11,376	de Paula 6'; Rotpuller (yellow card) 85'; Suttner (yellow card) 90+5'; Ortlechner (yellow card) 90+6'	Sabitzer 1'; Lazaro 23', 74'; Ilsanker (yellow card) 48'; Schmitz (yellow card) 60'; Keita (yellow card) 71'; Ramalho (yellow card) 90+2'; Soriano (yellow card) 90+5'	7	33	–3	
28	11 April; 18:30	A	Grödig	1–1	1,625			7	34	–3	
29	19 April; 16:30	H	Wolfsberg	1–1	7,780			7	35	–3	
30	26 April; 16:30	A	Rheindorf Altach	0–2	5,537			7	35	–5	
31	2 May; 18:30	H	Wiener Neustadt	2–1	7,122			6	38	–4	
32	9 May; 6:00	H	Sturm Graz	0–0	9,125			7	39	–4	
33	17 May; 16:30		Rapid Wien	1–4	29,800						
34	20 May; 20:30		Admira Wacker								
35	24 May; 17:45		Ried								
36	31 May; 16:30		Red Bull Salzburg	1–1	8,505			7	43	–6	

=== Table ===
Pos	Team	Pld	W	D	L	GF	GA	GD	Pts	Qualification or relegation
5	Wolfsberger AC	36	16	4	16	44	50	−6	52	Qualification for the Europa League second qualifying round
6	Ried	36	12	8	16	49	51	−2	44	
7	Austria Wien	36	10	13	13	45	51	−6	43	
8	Grödig	36	10	7	19	46	65	−19	37	
9	Admira Wacker	36	7	13	16	32	61	−29	34	

Source: weltfussball.de (in German)
Rules for classification: 1) points; 2) goal difference; 3) number of goals scored

=== Result summary ===
Overall								Home						Away					
Pld	W	D	L	GF	GA	GD	Pts	W	D	L	GF	GA	GD	W	D	L	GF	GA	GD
36	10	13	13	45	51	−6	43	7	6	5	26	21	+5	3	7	8	19	30	−11

Last updated: 1 June 2015.

== Austrian Cup ==
=== Austrian Cup review ===
Austria Wien kicked–off their season with a 6–0 win against First Vienna FC in the first round of the Austrian Cup on 11 July. Austria got two goals from Daniel Royer and a goal each from Martin Harrer, Alexander Gorgon, Roman Kienast, and Alexander Grünwald. Jens Stryger Larsen and Mario Leitgeb both debuted for the club. In the second round, on 24 September, Austria defeated Kitzbühel 5–0 with two goals from Alexander Grünwald and a goal each from Omer Damari, Florian Mader, and Martin Harrer. Then in the third round, Austria advanced to the quarter–finals with a 6–0 win.

=== Austrian Cup fixtures and results ===
Win Draw Loss Postponed

Rd	Date	Venue	Opponent	Res. F–A	Att.	Goalscorers and disciplined players		Ref.
Rd	Date	Venue	Opponent	Res. F–A	Att.	Austria Wien	Opponent	Ref.
1	11 July; 20:30	A	First Vienna FC	6–0	3,170	Harrer 23'; Royer 38', 53'; Gorgon 60'; Kienast 70'; Grünwald 86'	—	
2	24 September; 17:30	A	Kitzbühel	5–0	1,600	Grünwald 16', 22' (yellow card) 86'; Damari 30'; Mader 56'; Harrer 88'	Hetzenauer (yellow card) 67'; Gulyás (yellow card) 86'	
3	28 October; 20:30		Hartberg	6–0	2,000			

== Player information ==
=== Squad and statistics ===
As of 11 November 2014

No.	Pos	Nat	Player	Total		Bundesliga		Austrian Cup	
No.	Pos	Nat	Player	Apps	Goals	Apps	Goals	Apps	Goals
13	GK	(Austria) AUT	Heinz Lindner	18	0	15+0	0	3+0	0
31	GK	(Austria) AUT	Osman Hadžikić	0	0	0	0	0	0
77	GK	(Austria) AUT	Tino Casali	0	0	0	0	0	0
4	DF	(North Macedonia) MKD	Vanče Šikov	12	0	11+0	0	1+0	0
5	DF	(Austria) AUT	Philipp Koblischek	0	0	0	0	0	0
8	DF	(Denmark) DEN	Jens Stryger Larsen	17	1	14+1	1	2+0	0
14	DF	(Austria) AUT	Manuel Ortlechner	10	1	7+1	0	2+0	1
15	DF	(Austria) AUT	Christian Ramsebner	7	0	5+1	0	1+0	0
29	DF	(Austria) AUT	Markus Suttner	14	0	12+0	0	2+0	0
30	DF	(Austria) AUT	Fabian Koch	3	0	1+1	0	1+0	0
33	DF	(Austria) AUT	Lukas Rotpuller	10	0	7+1	0	2+0	0
6	MF	(Austria) AUT	Mario Leitgeb	15	1	9+3	0	2+1	1
7	MF	(Austria) AUT	Marco Meilinger	18	1	13+2	1	2+1	0
10	MF	(Austria) AUT	Alexander Grünwald	17	7	13+1	3	3+0	4
17	MF	(Austria) AUT	Florian Mader	12	1	6+3	0	2+1	1
20	MF	(Austria) AUT	Alexander Gorgon	10	2	6+2	1	1+1	1
21	MF	(Austria) AUT	Sascha Horvath	0	0	0	0	0	0
23	MF	(Spain) ESP	David de Paula	10	1	4+4	1	2+0	0
25	MF	(Australia) AUS	James Holland	12	0	11+0	0	1+0	0
28	MF	(Austria) AUT	Daniel Royer	15	6	11+2	4	2+0	2
35	MF	(Austria) AUT	Thomas Salamon	9	1	4+4	0	1+0	1
36	MF	(Austria) AUT	Tarkan Serbest	3	0	1+2	0	0	0
9	FW	(Austria) AUT	Martin Harrer	9	3	0+6	0	1+2	3
11	FW	(Norway) NOR	Ola Kamara	10	1	2+8	1	0	0
16	FW	(Israel) ISR	Omer Damari	12	9	10+0	7	2+0	2
24	FW	(Austria) AUT	Roman Kienast	7	1	2+2	0	0+3	1
				—					

== Notes ==
- 1.Contract includes an option year.
- 2.Even though the contract finished after the season, Austria Wien were required to pay a training fee.
