= Lukas Grill =

Lukas Grill may refer to:

- Lukas Grill (footballer, born 1993), German football defender
- Lukas Grill (footballer, born 1991), Austrian football midfielder
