= Kreso =

Kreso may refer to:

- Krešo, a Croatian masculine given name
- Kreso, a Bosnian surname
  - Goran Kreso, Austrian footballer
  - Senad Kreso (born 1955), Bosnian football manager
