= Omer Damari =

Israeli footballer (born 1989)

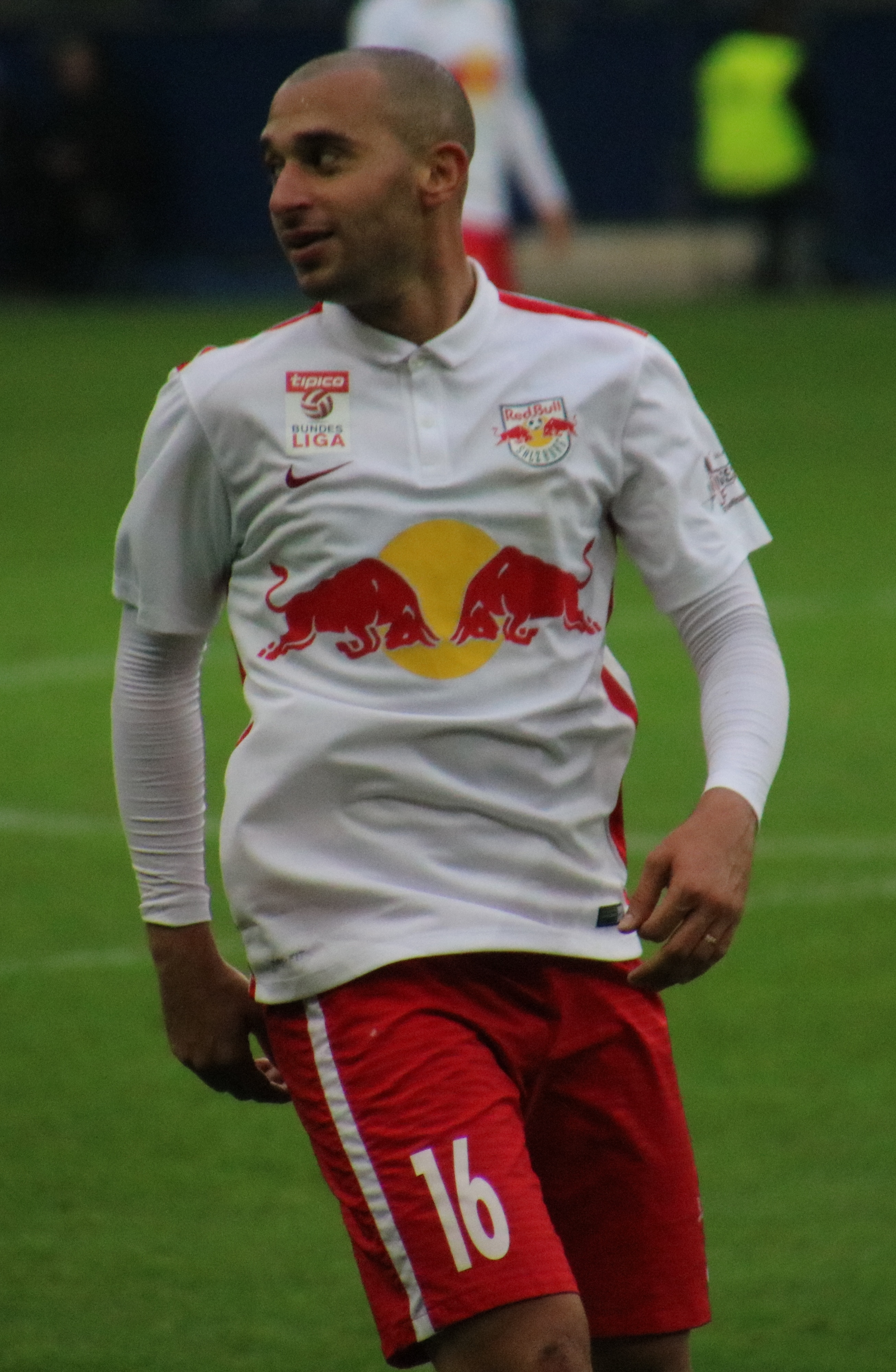
- Damari with Red Bull Salzburg, 2015

Personal information
- Date of birth: 24 March 1989 (age 37)
- Place of birth: Rishon LeZion, Israel
- Height: 1.82 m (6 ft 0 in)
- Position: Striker

Youth career
- Maccabi Petah Tikva

Senior career*
Years	Team	Apps	(Gls)
2006–2011	Maccabi Petah Tikva	118	(29)
2011–2014	Hapoel Tel Aviv	101	(56)
2014–2015	Austria Wien	13	(8)
2015–2018	RB Leipzig	10	(0)
2015–2016	→ Red Bull Salzburg (loan)	16	(4)
2016	→ New York Red Bulls (loan)	5	(0)
2017–2018	→ Maccabi Haifa (loan)	27	(4)
2018–2020	Hapoel Tel Aviv	33	(4)
Total		323	(105)

International career
2007–2008	Israel U19	10	(3)
2008–2010	Israel U21	10	(0)
2010–2016	Israel	20	(9)

Managerial career
- 2021–2022: Hapoel Tel Aviv U17
- * Club domestic league appearances and goals

Omer Damari (Hebrew: עומר דמארי; born 24 March 1989) is an Israeli former professional footballer who played as a striker.

== Club career ==
=== Maccabi Petah Tikva ===
Omer grew up in the youth ranks for Maccabi Petah Tikva and made his debut for the senior side on 21 November 2006 in a Toto Cup Al game against F.C. Ashdod. Due to his speed and ball skills he was deployed in wide midfield mostly but later became the leading striker for Maccabi due to good goalscoring form. He made 146 appearances for Maccabi, starting 88 matches, with 58 substitute appearances and scoring 34 goals.

=== Hapoel Tel Aviv ===
On 3 July 2011, Damari moved to Hapoel Tel Aviv costing €1.5 million, where he signed a five-year contract with €3 million buy-out clause. Damari helped Hapoel to the Israel State Cup during his first year at the club. He made 101 league appearances for Hapoel, scoring 56 goals in the process. During the 2013–14 season he scored a career high 26 league goals and 31 in all competitions. His fine play during the season led to interest from various clubs throughout Europe.

=== Austria Wien ===
In July 2014 Damari signed with Austria Wien. On 9 August 2014, Damari made his first appearance for the club scoring the opening goal for Wien in a 2–2 draw with SC Wiener Neustadt. He ended the season scoring 10 goals in 15 appearances.

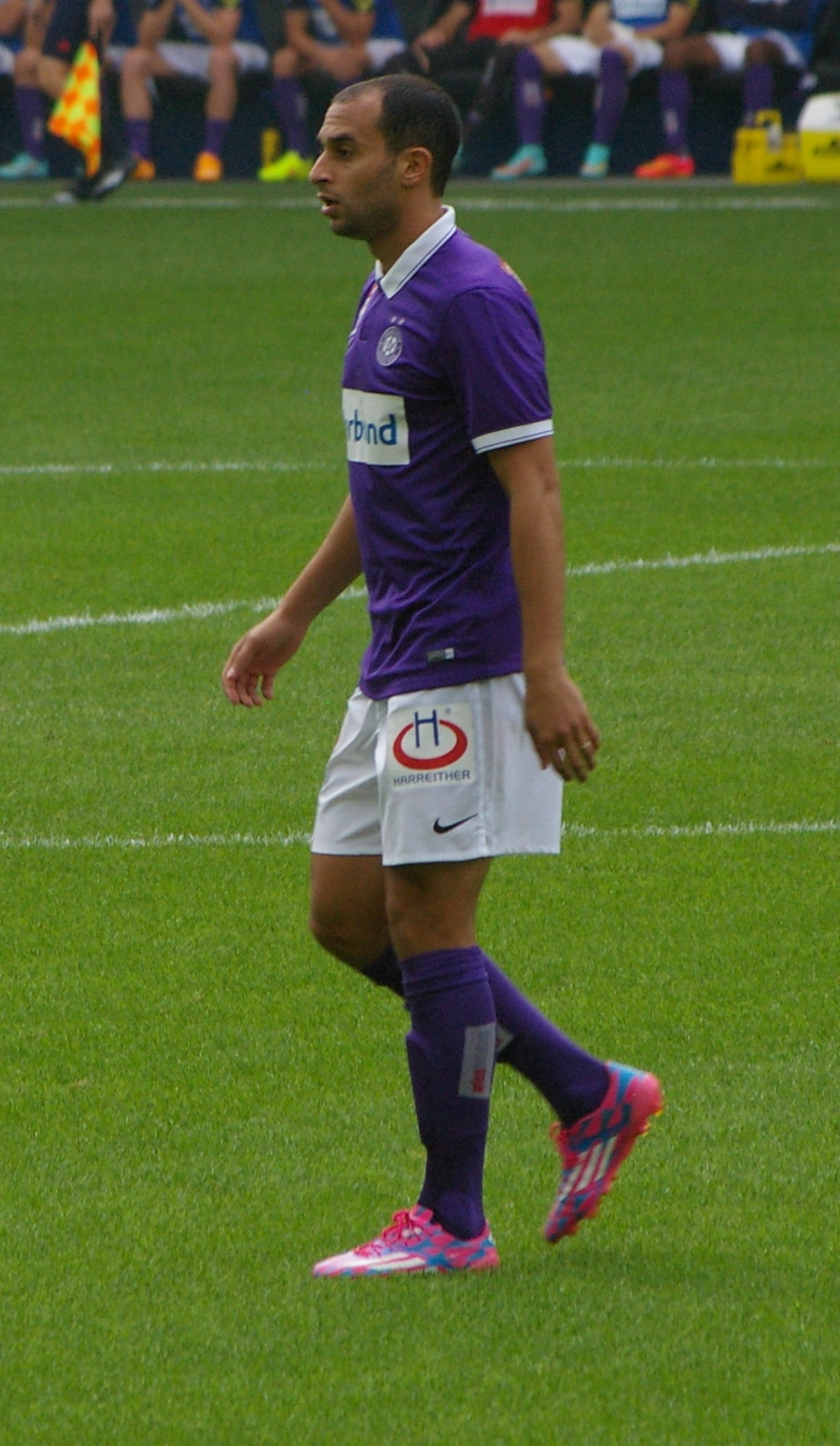
Damari playing for Austria Wien in 2014

=== RB Leipzig ===
In January 2015 Damari signed with RB Leipzig of the 2. Bundesliga.

=== Red Bull Salzburg ===
On 30 July 2015, Damari was loaned to sister club FC Red Bull Salzburg for one season. Damari established himself as a starter for Salzburg but was limited to 16 league games due to injury in which he managed to score four goals and provide four assists. He helped the club to the league and cup title during his loan spell.

=== New York Red Bulls ===
On 4 August 2016, Damari was once again sent on loan by RB Leipzig, this time to New York Red Bulls. Damari made his debut for New York on 13 August coming on in the second half in a 3–1 victory against the Montreal Impact. The following week, Damari scored his first goal for the club in a 1–1 draw against Alianza F.C. in the CONCACAF Champions League.

=== Maccabi Haifa ===
On 12 January 2017, Damari signed a contract with Maccabi Haifa.

=== Hapoel Tel Aviv ===
On 13 July 2018, Damari signed a contract with Hapoel Tel Aviv.

== Managerial career ==
On 14 June 2021, after a year of not playing football professionally, Damari announced his retirement from active play. On the same day, he was appointed coach of the Hapoel Tel Aviv's U17 team.

== International career ==
During the 2010–11 Israeli Premier League season Damari scored 15 goals and was called up for the national team for the first time. On 17 November 2010 he made his debut in a friendly against Iceland at Bloomfield Stadium in Tel Aviv, scoring two goals in the opening fifteen minutes of a 3–2 win.

Damari was selected by Eli Guttman for UEFA Euro 2016 qualifying. On 13 October 2014, he scored a hat-trick in a 4–1 away win over Andorra, the first goal coming in the third minute.

== Career statistics ==
=== Club ===
As of 13 August 2020

Appearances and goals by club, season and competition
Club	Season	League		National cup		League cup		Continental		Total	
Club	Season	Apps	Goals	Apps	Goals	Apps	Goals	Apps	Goals	Apps	Goals
Maccabi Petah Tikva	2006–07	4	0	2	1	3	0	–	–	9	1
Maccabi Petah Tikva	2007–08	23	3	1	0	4	0	–	–	28	3
Maccabi Petah Tikva	2008–09	29	1	1	0	4	1	–	–	34	2
Maccabi Petah Tikva	2009–10	32	10	3	1	5	0	–	–	40	11
Maccabi Petah Tikva	2010–11	30	15	1	0	4	2	–	–	35	17
Maccabi Petah Tikva	Total	118	29	8	2	20	3	0	0	146	34
Hapoel Tel Aviv	2011–12	36	17	4	2	5	2	10	4	55	25
Hapoel Tel Aviv	2012–13	29	13	3	1	2	0	5	1	39	15
Hapoel Tel Aviv	2013–14	36	26	1	0	0	0	4	5	41	31
Hapoel Tel Aviv	Total	101	56	8	3	7	2	19	10	135	71
Austria Wien	2014–15	13	8	2	2	0	0	0	0	15	10
RB Leipzig	2014–15	10	0	1	0	0	0	0	0	11	0
Red Bull Salzburg (loan)	2015–16	16	4	0	0	0	0	0	0	16	4
New York Red Bulls (loan)	2016	4	0	0	0	0	0	1	1	5	1
Maccabi Haifa (loan)	2016–17	9	2	0	0	0	0	0	0	9	2
Maccabi Haifa (loan)	2017–18	18	2	2	0	0	0	0	0	20	2
Maccabi Haifa (loan)	Total	27	4	2	0	0	0	0	0	29	4
Hapoel Tel Aviv	2019–20	12	2	0	0	0	0	0	0	12	2
Hapoel Tel Aviv	2020–21	21	2	3	0	0	0	0	0	24	2
Hapoel Tel Aviv	Total	33	4	3	0	0	0	0	0	36	4
Career total		322	105	24	7	27	5	20	11	393	128

=== International ===
Scores and results list Israel's goal tally first, score column indicates score after each Damari goal.

List of international goals scored by Omer Damari
No.	Date	Venue	Opponent	Score	Result	Competition
1	17 November 2010	Bloomfield Stadium, Tel Aviv, Israel	Iceland	1–0	3–2	Friendly
2	17 November 2010	Bloomfield Stadium, Tel Aviv, Israel	Iceland	2–0	3–2	Friendly
3	14 November 2012	Teddy Stadium, Jerusalem, Israel	Belarus	1–0	1–2	Friendly
4	1 June 2014	BBVA Compass Stadium, Houston, United States	Honduras	3–1	4–2	Friendly
5	10 October 2014	GSP Stadium, Nicosia, Cyprus	Cyprus	1–0	2–1	UEFA Euro 2016 qualifying
6	13 October 2014	Estadi Comunal d'Andorra la Vella, Andorra la Vella, Andorra	Andorra	1–0	4–1	UEFA Euro 2016 qualifying
7	13 October 2014	Estadi Comunal d'Andorra la Vella, Andorra la Vella, Andorra	Andorra	2–1	4–1	UEFA Euro 2016 qualifying
8	13 October 2014	Estadi Comunal d'Andorra la Vella, Andorra la Vella, Andorra	Andorra	3–1	4–1	UEFA Euro 2016 qualifying
9	16 November 2014	Sammy Ofer Stadium, Haifa, Israel	Bosnia and Herzegovina	2–0	3–0	UEFA Euro 2016 qualifying

== Honours ==
Hapoel Tel Aviv

- Israel State Cup: 2012

Red Bull Salzburg

- Austrian Bundesliga: 2015–16
- Austrian Cup: 2015–16

Individual

- Israeli Premier League: player of the week 2017–18
