= David de Paula =

Spanish footballer

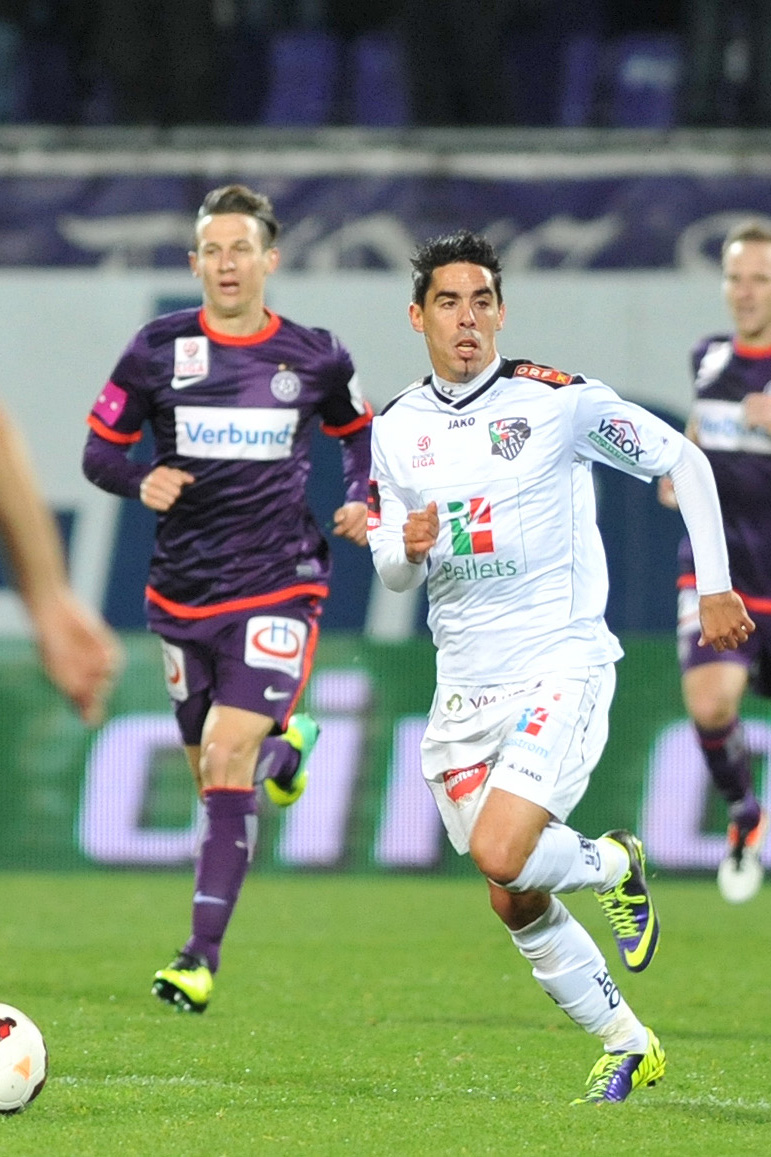
- De Paula (right) playing for Wolfsberger AC in 2013

Personal information
- Full name: David de Paula Gallardo
- Date of birth: 31 May 1984 (age 42)
- Place of birth: Durango, Spain
- Height: 1.76 m (5 ft 9 1/2 in)
- Position: Midfielder

Youth career
- Cultural Durango
- 2002–2003: Athletic Bilbao

Senior career*
Years	Team	Apps	(Gls)
2003–2004	Basconia	36	(9)
2004–2006	Bilbao Athletic	71	(12)
2005	Athletic Bilbao	0	(0)
2006–2007	Alicante	16	(0)
2007–2008	Lemona	33	(6)
2008–2009	Ponferradina	15	(1)
2009–2011	Palencia	69	(11)
2011–2012	Logroñés	35	(11)
2012–2014	Wolfsberger AC	51	(2)
2014–2018	Austria Wien	90	(8)
2018–2019	Barakaldo	29	(3)
- * Club domestic league appearances and goals

David de Paula Gallardo (born 31 May 1984) is a Spanish former footballer who played as a midfielder.

He played football in Austria, with Wolfsberger AC and Austria Wien. In his country, he amassed Segunda División B a total of 270 matches and 44 goals for a host of clubs.

== Club career ==
Born in Durango, Biscay, de Paula finished his development at Athletic Bilbao after joining the club at the age of 18. His only competitive appearances for the first team occurred during the 2005 UEFA Intertoto Cup, as he started in both legs of the tie against FC Ecomax, lost after a penalty shootout.

De Paula only played lower league football in his home country, amassing Segunda División B totals of 270 matches and 44 goals for Bilbao Athletic, Alicante CF, SD Lemona, SD Ponferradina, CF Palencia, UD Logroñés and Barakaldo CF, over nine seasons. With Logroñés, he scored a career-best 11 goals in 2011–12, helping to a final fifth position.

Aged 28, de Paula moved to Austria, signing with Wolfsberger AC. His Bundesliga debut took place on 25 July 2012, when he came on as a 69th-minute substitute for compatriot Jacobo in a 0–1 home defeat to FK Austria Wien.

In the 2014 January transfer window, de Paula moved to Austria Wien.

== Career statistics ==
As of match played on 17 December 2017

Club statistics
Club	Season	League			Cup		Continental		Other		Total	
Club	Season	Division	Apps	Goals	Apps	Goals	Apps	Goals	Apps	Goals	Apps	Goals
Bilbao Athletic	2006–07	Segunda División B	36	6	—		—		—		36	6
Bilbao Athletic	2007–08	Segunda División B	35	6	—		—		—		35	6
Bilbao Athletic	Total		71	11	—		—		—		71	11
Athletic Bilbao	2005–06	La Liga	0	0	0	0	2 (Note: Appearances in UEFA Intertoto Cup)	0	—		2	0
Alicante	2006–07	Segunda División B	16	0	1	0	—		—		17	0
Lemona	2007–08	Segunda División B	33	6	1	0	—		—		34	6
Ponferradina	2008–09	Segunda División B	15	1	4	0	—		—		19	1
Palencia	2009–10	Segunda División B	35	4	2	0	—		2 (Note: Appearances in Promotion Play-offs)	0	39	4
Palencia	2010–11	Segunda División B	34	7	1	0	—		—		35	7
Palencia	Total		69	11	3	0	—		2	0	74	11
Logroñés	2011–12	Segunda División B	35	11	2	0	—		—		37	11
Wolfsberger AC	2012–13	Austrian Bundesliga	32	2	2	1	—		—		34	3
Wolfsberger AC	2013–14	Austrian Bundesliga	19	0	2	2	—		—		21	2
Wolfsberger AC	Total		51	2	4	3	—		—		55	5
Austria Wien	2013–14	Austrian Bundesliga	14	2	0	0	—		—		14	2
Austria Wien	2014–15	Austrian Bundesliga	22	4	5	1	—		—		27	5
Austria Wien	2015–16	Austrian Bundesliga	20	1	1	0	—		—		21	1
Austria Wien	2016–17	Austrian Bundesliga	12	0	1	0	4 (Note: Appearances in UEFA Europa League)	0	—		17	0
Austria Wien	2017–18	Austrian Bundesliga	15	0	2	0	8	0	—		25	0
Austria Wien	Total		83	7	9	1	12	0	—		104	8
Career total			373	50	24	4	14	0	2	0	413	54
