= Tino Casali =

Austrian footballer (born 1995)

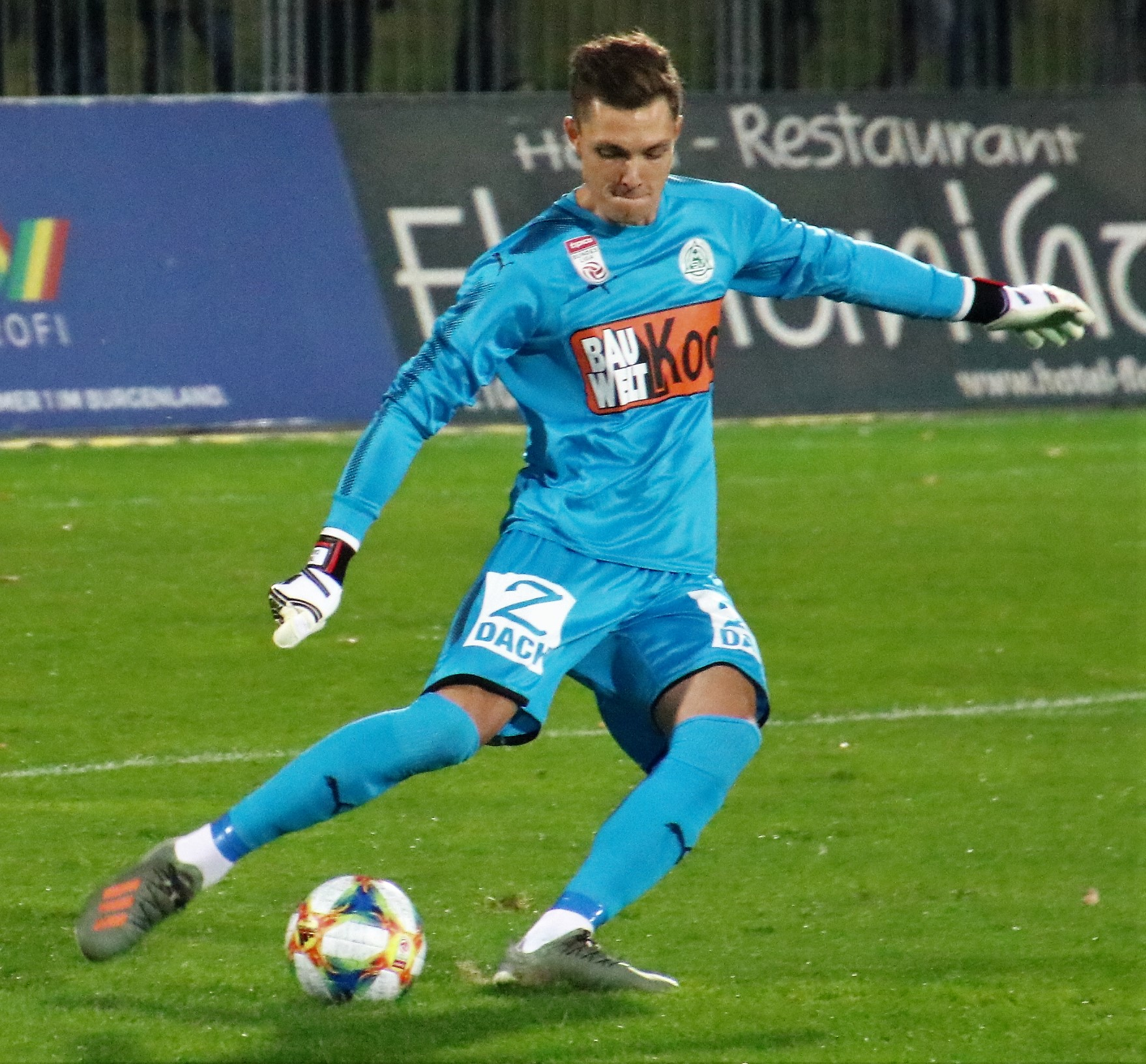
- Casali in 2019

Personal information
- Date of birth: 14 November 1995 (age 30)
- Place of birth: Villach, Austria
- Height: 1.91 m (6 ft 3 in)
- Position: Goalkeeper

Team information
- Current team: VfL Bochum
- Number: 16

Youth career
- 2001–2009: SV Spittal/Drau
- 2009–2013: AKA Kärnten
- 2013–2014: Austria Wien

Senior career*
Years	Team	Apps	(Gls)
2013–2017	Austria Wien	0	(0)
2013–2017	Austria Wien II	29	(0)
2015	→ Floridsdorfer AC (loan)	8	(0)
2017–2020	SV Mattersburg	9	(0)
2020–2023	Rheindorf Altach	57	(0)
2023–2025	Eintracht Braunschweig	1	(0)
2025–2026	Rheindorf Altach	0	(0)
2026	Rot-Weiss Essen	2	(0)
2026–	VfL Bochum	0	(0)

International career
2012–2013	Austria U18	3	(0)
2013–2014	Austria U19	4	(0)
2015	Austria U20	5	(0)
- * Club domestic league appearances and goals as of 20 May 2026

Tino Casali (born 14 November 1995) is an Austrian professional footballer who plays as a goalkeeper for German 2. Bundesliga club VfL Bochum. He has represented Austria at youth level.

== Club career ==
=== Early years ===
Casali began his footballing career with SV Spittal/Drau. In 2009, he joined the regional team of AKA Carinthia, where he progressed through all youth teams. In April 2013, he made his senior debut for Spittal/Drau in the Landesliga. This remained his only appearance for Spittal in the fourth highest league.

=== Austria Wien ===
On 5 March 2013, Casali joined the youth academy of Austria Wien, signing a two-year deal. In October 2013 he played his first and only game for the U19 team in the UEFA Youth League against Atlético Madrid. In February 2014, he was part of the first-team squad for the league match against Rapid Wien, without having previously played for the reserves. In March 2014, he finally made his debut for Austria Wien II against the reserves of SV Mattersburg in the Austrian Regionalliga, conceding five goals in a 5–0 loss. By the end of the season, he had made 11 appearances in the Regionalliga. Ahead of the 2014–15 season, he was definitively promoted to the first team. In that season he also made 11 appearances for the reserves.

On 6 July 2015, Casali joined Floridsdorfer AC on a season-long loan as part of a cooperation agreement with Austria Wien. He made his Austrian Football First League debut for the club on 24 July 2015 in a game against LASK. After eight second division games for Floridsdorf, he returned to Austria Wien prematurely in October 2015 after regular goalkeeper Robert Almer was injured. However, he did not play for the team and only made another appearance for the reserves in the Regionalliga. In the 2016–17 season, he only made six Regionalliga appearances.

=== SV Mattersburg ===
On 22 July 2017, Casali signed a two-year contract with SV Mattersburg after having failed at making his breakthrough with Austria Wien. In the 2017–18 season, he did not make an appearance for the club from Burgenland and only played one game for the reserves in the Landesliga Burgenland, with whom he was promoted to the Regionalliga at the end of the season.

In April 2019, he finally made his debut in the Austrian Football Bundesliga when he was in the starting lineup on matchday 25 of the 2018–19 season against Rapid Wien. In his second season at the club, Casali made five total Bundesliga appearances. In the 2019–20 season, he played four games in the top division, and he also made another appearance for the reserves in the Regionalliga.

=== Rheindorf Altach ===
On 10 July 2020, Casali joined Rheindorf Altach. He made his debut for the club on 16 September in a 3–1 victory against Union Gurten in the Austrian Cup. His league debut followed three days later in a game against Red Bull Salzburg. Mainly a backup to club legend Martin Kobras in his first season with the club, Casali became the starter for the first time in his career ahead of the 2021–22 season.

=== Eintracht Braunschweig ===
On 22 June 2023, Casali joined 2. Bundesliga club Eintracht Braunschweig on a two-year contract.

=== Rot-Weiss Essen ===
On 3 February 2026, Casali returned to Germany and signed with Rot-Weiss Essen in 3. Liga.

=== VfL Bochum ===
On 16 July 2026, Casali signed a two-season contract with 2. Bundesliga club VfL Bochum.
