= Vanče Šikov =

Macedonian footballer (born 1985)

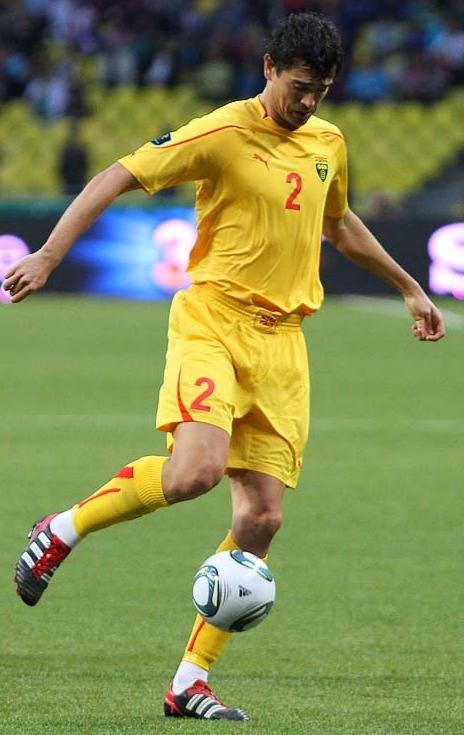
- Playing for Macedonia in 2011

Personal information
- Full name: Vanče Šikov
- Date of birth: 19 July 1985 (age 41)
- Place of birth: Kavadarci, SR Macedonia, SFR Yugoslavia
- Height: 1.94 m (6 ft 4 in)
- Position: Centre back

Youth career
- –2002: Tikvesh

Senior career*
Years	Team	Apps	(Gls)
2002–2003	Tikvesh	16	(1)
2003–2006	Skoda Xanthi	55	(2)
2006–2007	Pobeda	10	(1)
2007–2008	Olympiacos	0	(0)
2007	→ Kerkyra (loan)	12	(2)
2007–2008	→ Apollon Kalamarias (loan)	22	(0)
2008–2011	Ethnikos Achna	77	(4)
2011–2014	Volyn Lutsk	68	(3)
2014–2016	Austria Wien	46	(2)
2016	Neftchi Baku	9	(0)
2017	Rabotnichki	15	(0)
2017–2018	Tobol	13	(0)
2018–2019	Akademija Pandev	12	(1)
2019–2021	Tikvesh	28	(2)
2021	Borec	4	(0)

International career
	Macedonia U21	12	(1)
2005	Macedonia (unofficial)	2	(0)
2007–2017	Macedonia	56	(4)
- * Club domestic league appearances and goals as of 15 December 2020

Vanče Šikov (Macedonian: Ванче Шиков; born 19 July 1985) is a former Macedonian footballer.

== Club career ==
Born in Kavadarci, Macedonia, Shikov started his football career at FK Tikvesh.

In 2002, he went to play for Greek side Skoda Xanthi where he has played 55 games and scored two goals. In 2006, he was bought by Olympiacos but was loaned out to Kerkyra for five months where he played 13 games scoring two goals, against Egaleo on 4 February 2007 and against Ergotelis on 29 April 2007. At the end of the loan deal between Olympiacos and Kerkyra, on 13 May, he was officially signed as a player of Olympiacos in Athens.

After spending three years in Cyprus with Ethnikos Achna, Šikov signed a three-year deal with Ukrainian club Volyn Lutsk in the summer of 2011.

=== Neftchi Baku ===
On 20 June 2016, Santin signed with Neftchi Baku, before having his contract terminated by mutual consent on 16 December 2016.

== International career ==
He made his senior debut for Macedonia in a November 2005 friendly match against Iran and has earned a total of 58 caps, scoring 4 goals. His final international was a June 2017 FIFA World Cup qualification match against Spain.

== Career statistics ==
=== International ===
As of match played 9 October 2016

Macedonia
Year	Apps	Goals
2007	1	0
2008	0	0
2009	1	0
2010	7	2
2011	9	1
2012	8	0
2013	6	0
2014	5	0
2015	8	1
2016	7	0
Total	52	4

=== International goals ===
#	Date	Venue	Opponent	Score	Result	Competition
1	2 June 2010	Villach	Romania	1–0	1–0	Friendly
2	8 October 2010	Andorra la Vella	Andorra	0–2	0–2	UEFA Euro 2012 qualifying
3	7 October 2011	Hanrapetakan Stadium	Armenia	4–1	4–1	UEFA Euro 2012 qualifying
4	12 November 2015	Skopje	Montenegro	1–0	4–1	Friendly
