= Matthias Hager =

Austrian footballer

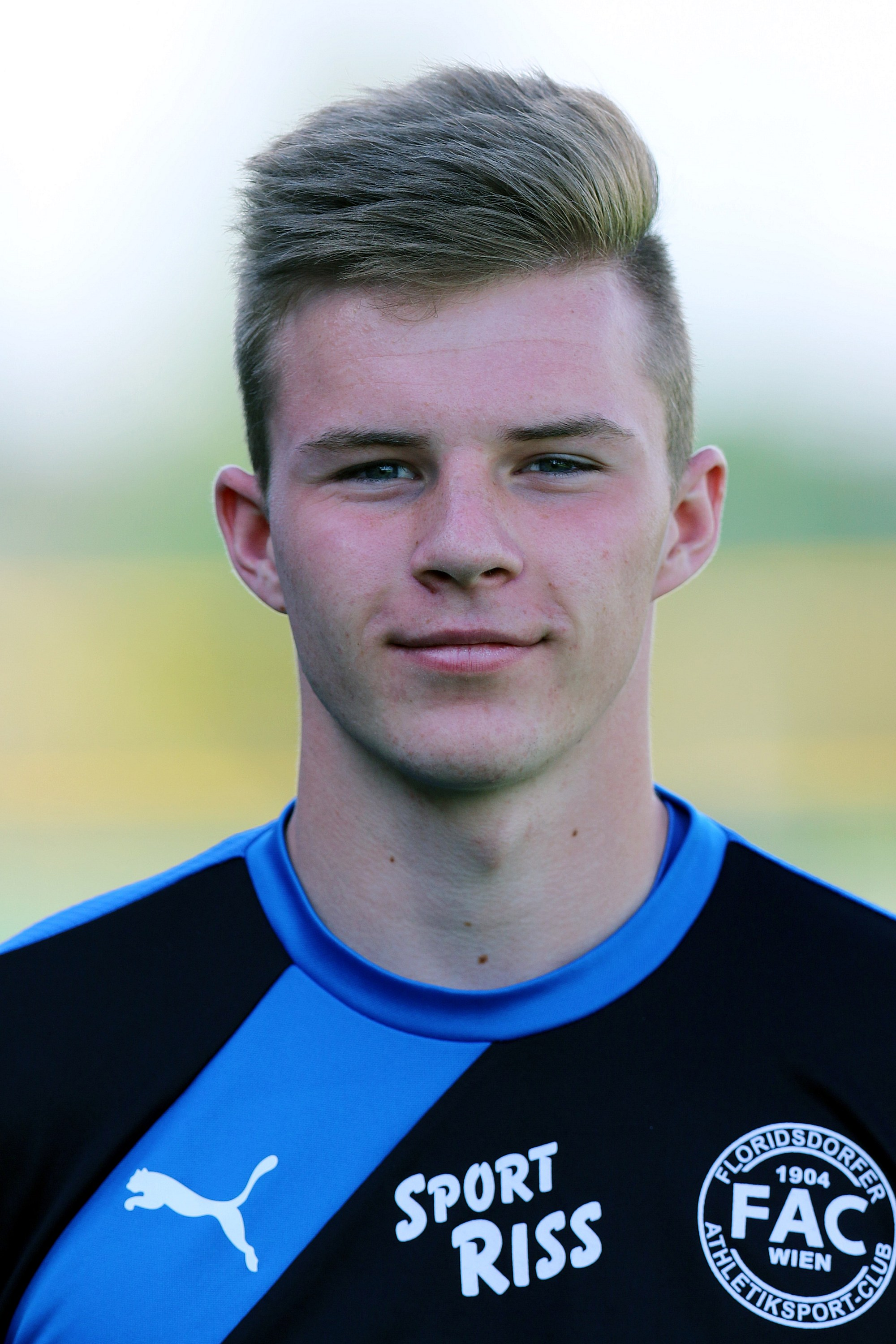
- Hager for FAC in 2016

Personal information
- Date of birth: 14 November 1997 (age 28)
- Place of birth: Austria
- Height: 1.78 m (5 ft 10 in)
- Position: Centre-back

Team information
- Current team: SC Wolkersdorf
- Number: 4

Youth career
- 2004–2011: OMV Auersthal
- 2011–2015: FAC

Senior career*
Years	Team	Apps	(Gls)
2015–2016	FAC II	13	(0)
2016–2017	FAC	11	(0)
2017	→ SV Schwechat (loan)	7	(0)
2017–2018	SKN St. Pölten II	11	(0)
2018–	SC Wolkersdorf	70	(2)
- * Club domestic league appearances and goals as of 18:56, 12 March 2023 (UTC)

Matthias Hager (born 14 November 1997) is an Austrian footballer who currently plays as a centre-back for SC Wolkersdorf. He formerly played for the reserve team of SKN St. Pölten and also for SV Schwechat on loan from Floridsdorfer AC.
