= Stefan Krickl =

Austrian footballer

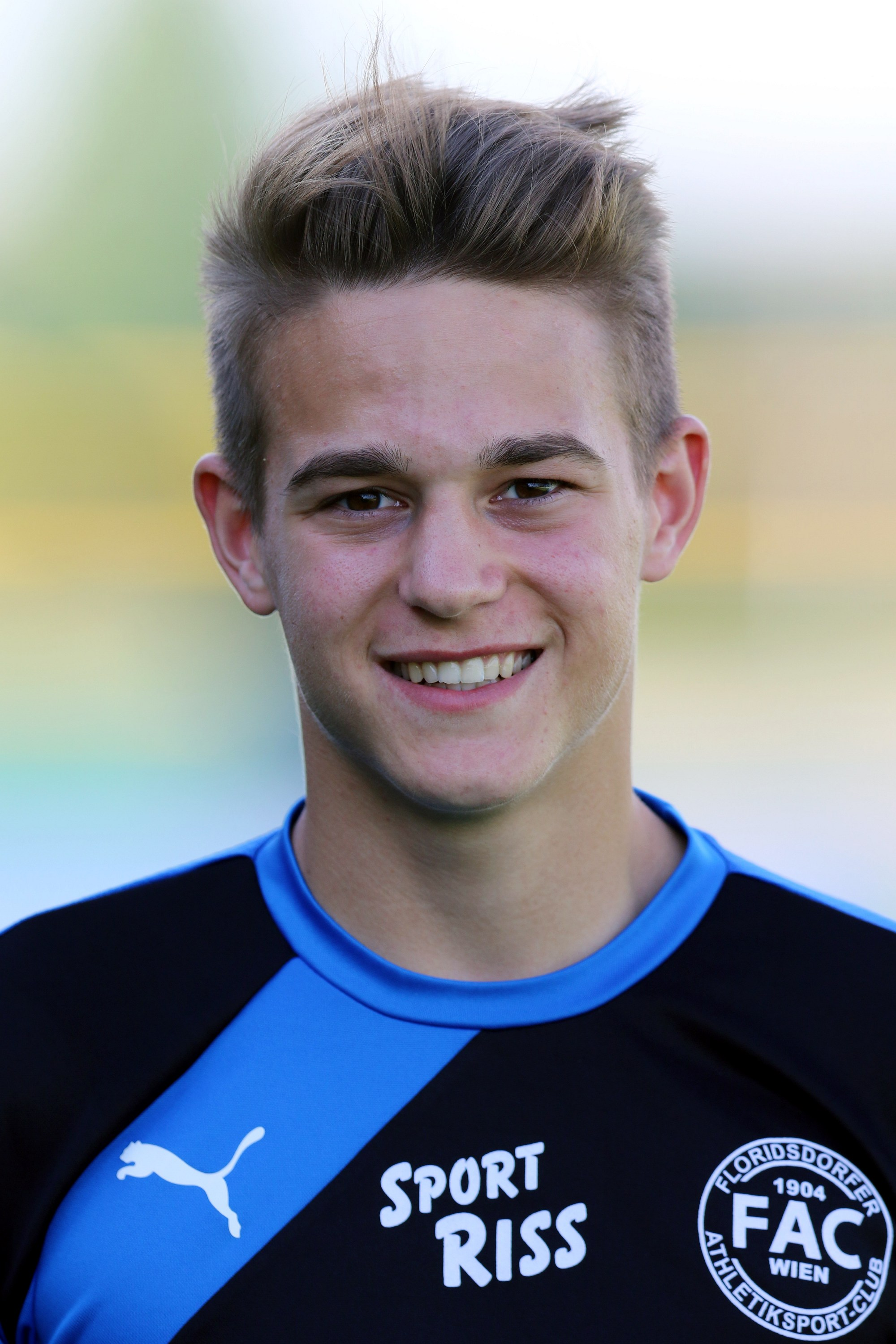
- Krickl with FAC in 2016

Personal information
- Full name: Stefan Krickl
- Date of birth: 7 October 1997 (age 29)
- Place of birth: Austria
- Position: Midfielder

Team information
- Current team: SC Prottes
- Number: 6

Youth career
- 2003–2009: Großschweinbarth SV
- 2009–2010: Trenkwalder Admira
- 2010–2011: Großschweinbarth SV
- 2011–2012: AKA HIB Liebenau
- 2012–2016: FAC

Senior career*
Years	Team	Apps	(Gls)
2016–2017	FAC	21	(0)
2017	→ SV Schwechat (loan)	12	(0)
2017–2018	Großschweinbarth SV	25	(17)
2018–	SC Prottes	72	(4)

International career
2016	Austria U19	1	(0)
- * Club domestic league appearances and goals as of 19:23, 12 March 2023 (UTC)

Stefan Krickl (born 7 October 1997) is an Austrian footballer who currently plays for SC Prottes.
