= David Schloffer =

Austrian footballer

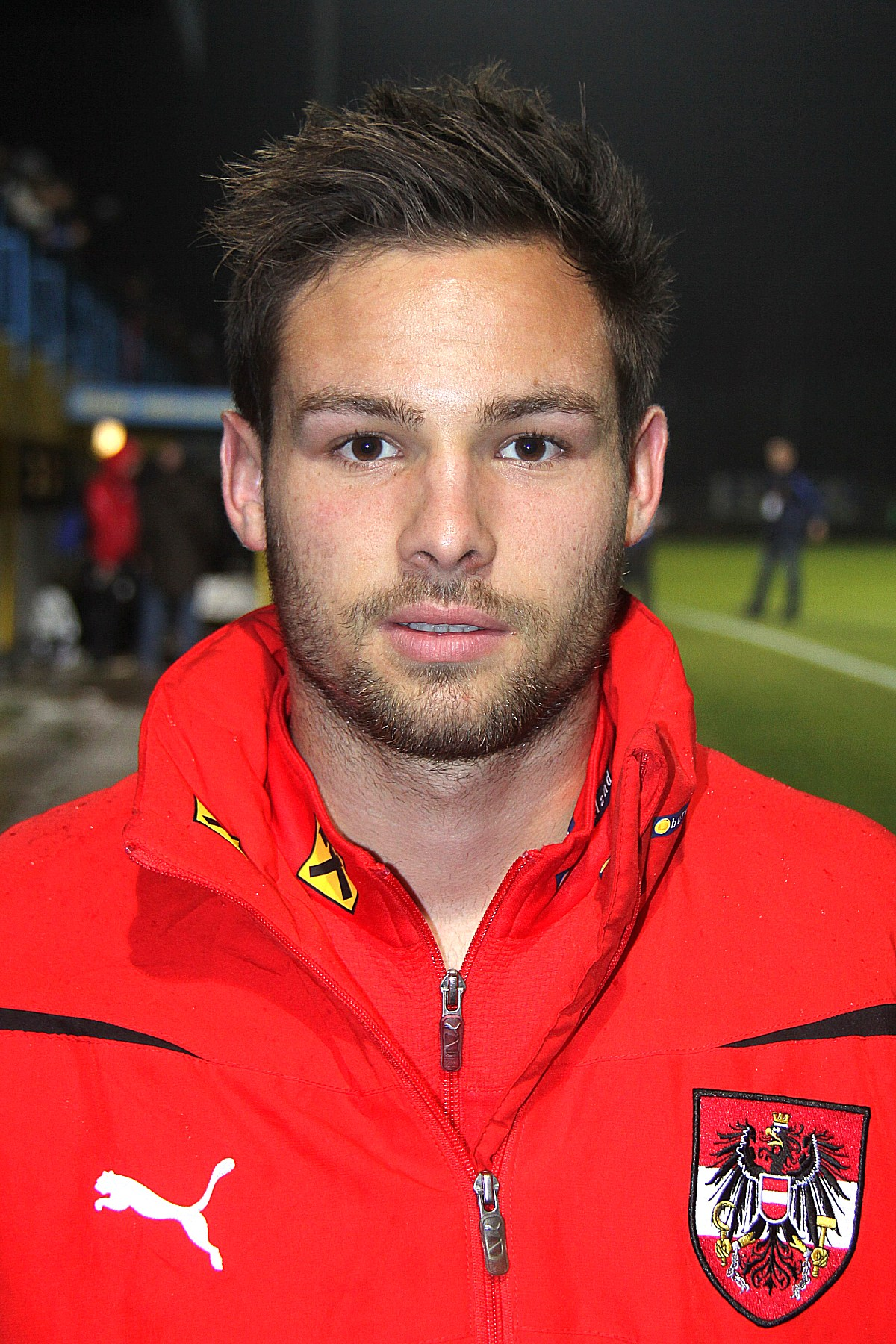

Personal information
- Date of birth: 28 April 1992 (age 34)
- Place of birth: Graz, Austria
- Height: 1.70 m (5 ft 7 in)
- Position: Attacking midfielder

Team information
- Current team: FC Gleisdorf 09
- Number: 23

Youth career
- 1999–2004: USV Markt Hartmannsdorf
- 2004–2009: SK Sturm Graz

Senior career*
Years	Team	Apps	(Gls)
2009–2015	SK Sturm Graz II	69	(16)
2012–2016	SK Sturm Graz	68	(6)
2015–2016	→ SV Elversberg (loan)	20	(4)
2016–2017	FSV Wacker 90 Nordhausen	22	(1)
2018–2021	SV Lafnitz	80	(10)
2021–	FC Gleisdorf 09	8	(2)

International career^{‡}
2013	Austria U-21	4	(0)
- * Club domestic league appearances and goals as of 4 September 2021 ‡ National team caps and goals as of 13 June 2018

David Schloffer (born 28 April 1992) is an Austrian professional footballer who plays as an attacking midfielder for FC Gleisdorf 09 in Austrian Regionalliga Central.

== Club career ==
He signed his professional contract with SK Sturm Graz in July 2012.

== International career ==
He made his debut for the Austria U-21 team in 2013.
