= Rami Tekir =

Austrian footballer

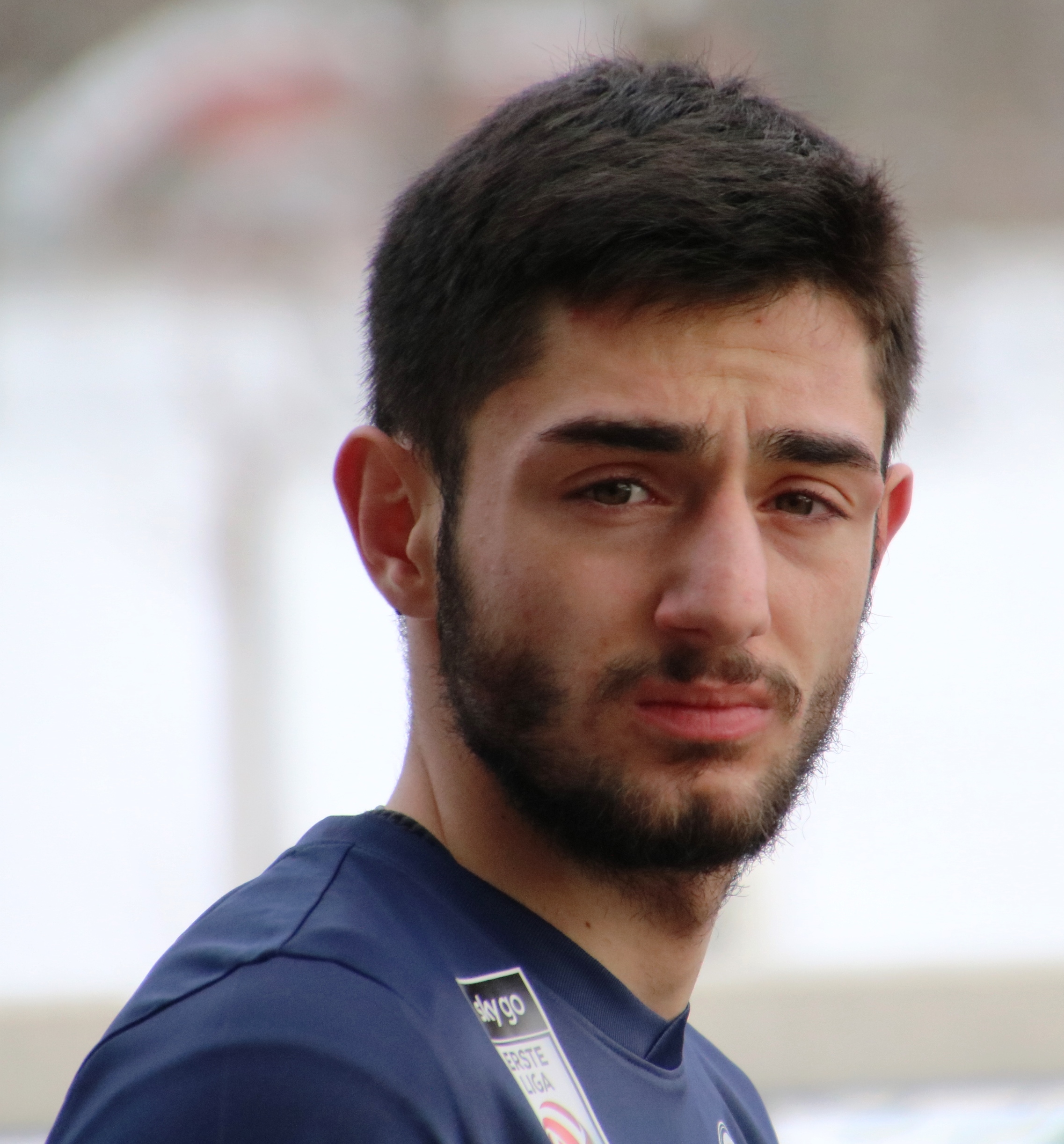

Personal information
- Date of birth: 10 January 1997 (age 29)
- Place of birth: Innsbruck, Austria
- Height: 1.68 m (5 ft 6 in)
- Position: Attacking midfielder

Team information
- Current team: FC Wacker Innsbruck
- Number: 10

Youth career
- 2003–2007: SK Rum
- 2007–2011: FC Wacker Innsbruck
- 2011–2014: AKA Tirol

Senior career*
Years	Team	Apps	(Gls)
2014–2017	FC Wacker Innsbruck II	40	(6)
2015–2017	FC Wacker Innsbruck	33	(3)
2017–2019	FC Liefering	27	(0)
2019–	FC Wacker Innsbruck	1	(0)

International career
2012	Austria U16	1	(0)
2014	Austria U17	2	(0)
2016	Austria U19	1	(1)
2017–2018	Austria U21	6	(1)
- * Club domestic league appearances and goals as of 28 September 2019

Rami Tekir (born 10 January 1997) is an Austrian professional footballer who plays as an attacking midfielder for 2. Liga club FC Wacker Innsbruck, which he also captains.

== Personal life ==
Born in Austria, Tekir is of Turkish descent.
