= Urias (footballer) =

Brazilian footballer

Lucas Xavier
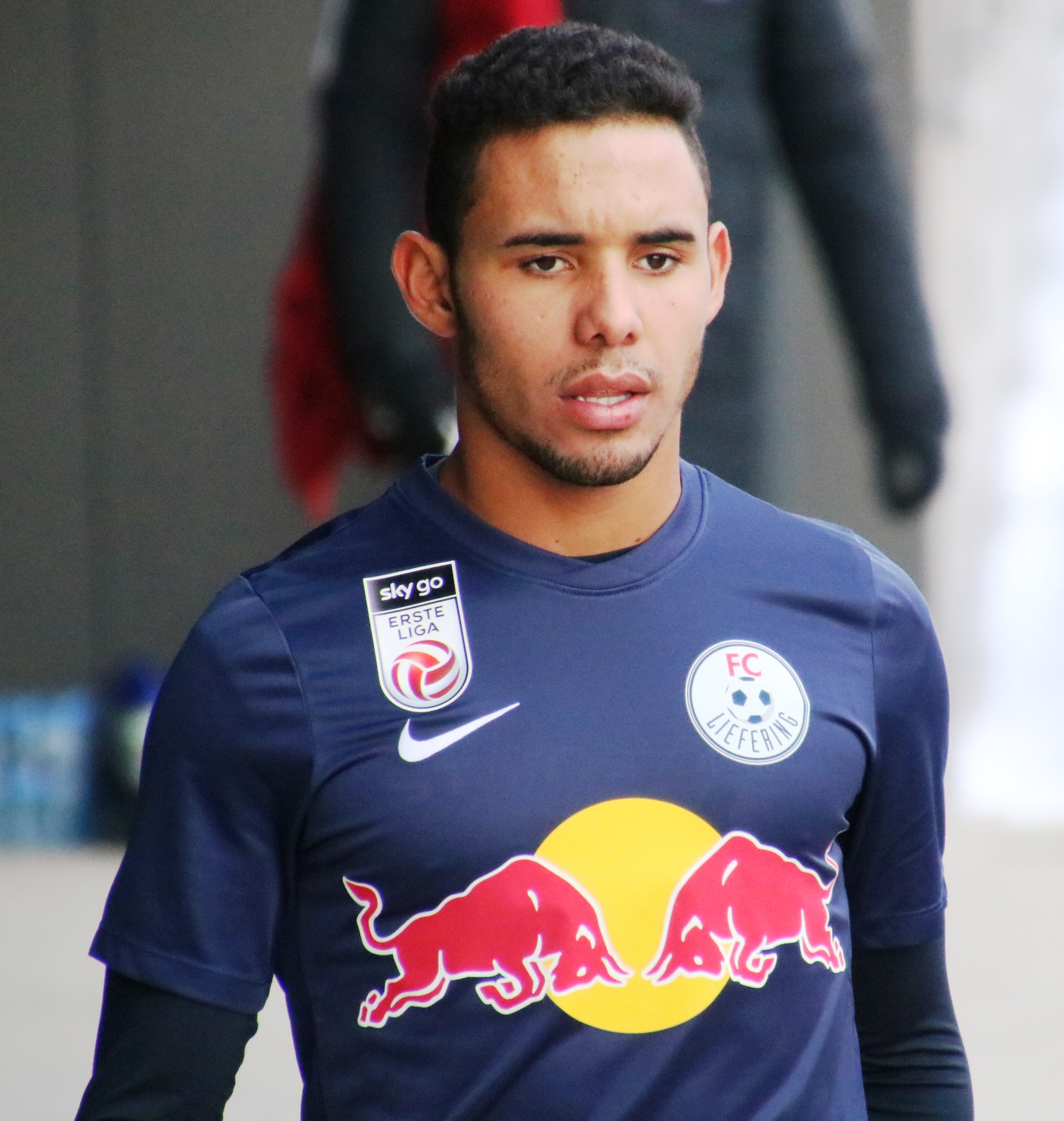

Personal information
- Full name: Lucas Xavier Urias
- Date of birth: 20 February 1998 (age 28)
- Place of birth: Brazil
- Position: Right back

Team information
- Current team: Grêmio Osasco

Youth career
- 2015–2017: Red Bull Brasil

Senior career*
Years	Team	Apps	(Gls)
2017–2019	Red Bull Brasil	0	(0)
2017	→ FC Liefering (loan)	5	(0)
2019	→ Inter de Limeira (loan)	0	(0)
2019	→ Grêmio Osasco (loan)	0	(0)
2020–	Grêmio Osasco	0	(0)
- * Club domestic league appearances and goals as of 22:47, 13 May 2020 (UTC)

Lucas Xavier Urias (born 20 February 1998), known simply as Lucas Xavier, is a Brazilian footballer who currently plays as a right back for Grêmio Osasco.

== Club career ==
Urias joined Red Bull Brasil in 2015, and was loaned to affiliate Austrian club FC Liefering in early 2017. He made his debut for Liefering in a 1-0 win over Floridsdorfer AC, playing 67 minutes before being substituted.

== Career statistics ==
=== Club ===
As of 13 May 2020.

Club	Season	League			State League		Cup		Other		Total	
Club	Season	Division	Apps	Goals	Apps	Goals	Apps	Goals	Apps	Goals	Apps	Goals
Red Bull Brasil	2017	Série D	0	0	0	0	0	0	0	0	0	0
Red Bull Brasil	2018	–			0	0	0	0	20 (Note: Appearances in the Copa Paulista)	0	20	0
Red Bull Brasil	2019	–			0	0	0	0	0	0	0	0
Red Bull Brasil	Total		0	0	0	0	0	0	20	0	20	0
FC Liefering (loan)	2016–17	Erste Liga	5	0	–		0	0	0	0	5	0
Inter de Limeira (loan)	2019	–			3 (Note: Appearances in the Campeonato Paulista A2)	0	0	0	0	0	3	0
Grêmio Osasco (loan)	2019	–			0	0	0	0	6	0	6	0
Grêmio Osasco	2020	–			1 (Note: Appearances in the Campeonato Paulista A3)	0	0	0	0	0	1	0
Career total			5	0	4	0	0	0	26	0	35	0
