= Martin Harrer =

Austrian footballer

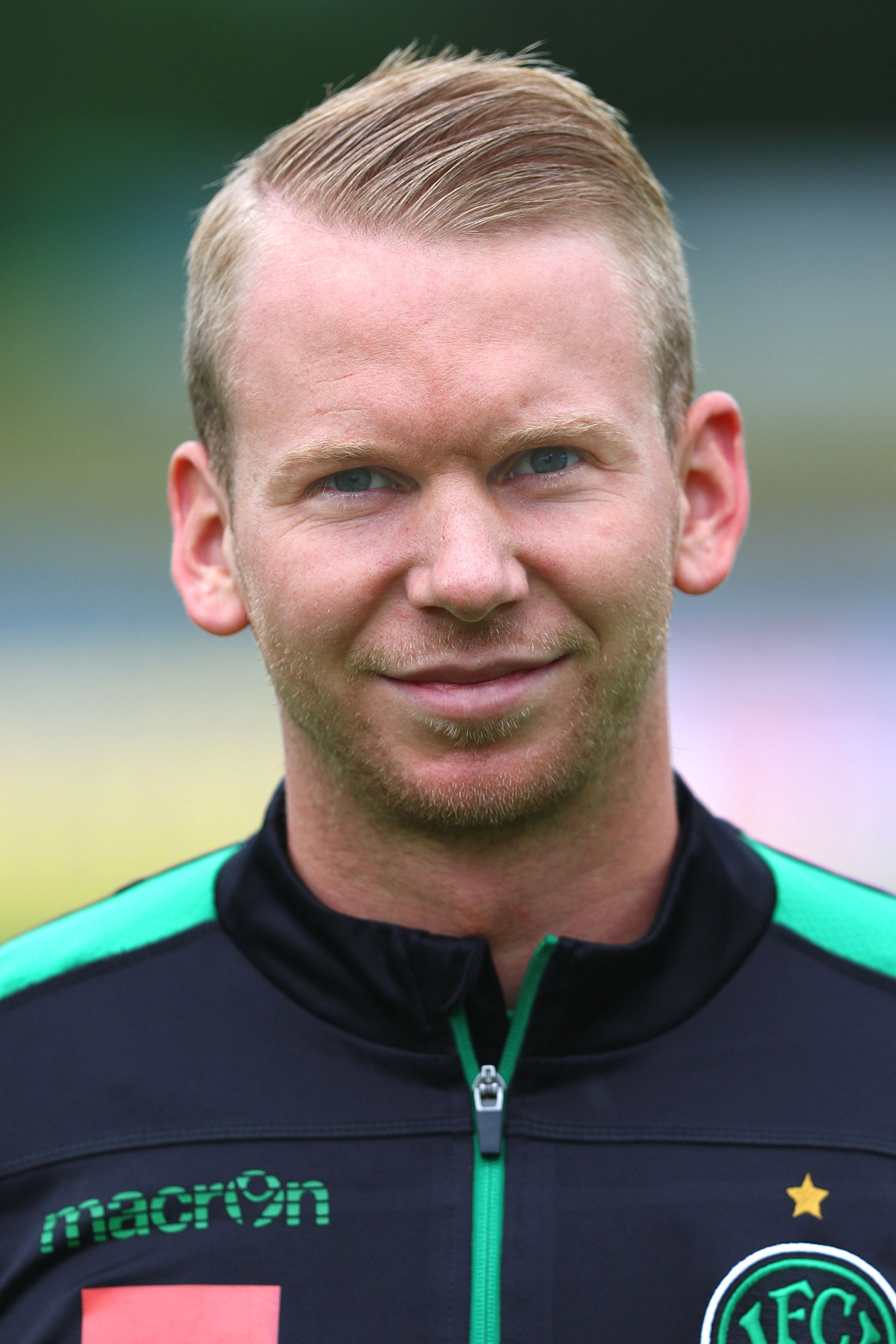

Personal information
- Full name: Martin Harrer
- Date of birth: 19 May 1992 (age 34)
- Place of birth: Voitsberg, Austria
- Height: 1.84 m (6 ft 0 in)
- Positions: Midfielder; winger; forward

Team information
- Current team: Grazer AK
- Number: 20

Youth career
- 2000–2001: SV Stallhofen
- 2001–2004: ASK Voitsberg
- 2004–2006: ASK Köflach
- 2006–2009: Austria Wien

Senior career*
Years	Team	Apps	(Gls)
2009–2013	Austria Wien II	61	(25)
2011–2013	Austria Wien	1	(0)
2013	→ Grödig (loan)	4	(1)
2013–2014	→ Rheindorf Altach (loan)	33	(9)
2014–2015	Austria Wien	6	(0)
2014–2015	→ Pasching (loan)	1	(0)
2014–2015	→ LASK Linz (loan)	3	(0)
2015–2017	Rheindorf Altach	42	(4)
2017–2019	Wacker Innsbruck	42	(5)
2019	Voluntari	4	(0)
2020–	Grazer AK	11	(2)
- * Club domestic league appearances and goals as of 18:58, 26 August 2020 (UTC)

Martin Harrer (born 19 May 1992) is an Austrian footballer who plays as a midfielder, winger or forward for Grazer AK.
