= Nikolai Vambersky =

Austrian footballer

Personal information
- Date of birth: 8 March 1997 (age 29)
- Height: 1.85 m (6 ft 1 in)
- Position: Goalkeeper

Youth career
- 2003–2006: SC Columbia Floridsdorf
- 2006–2008: KSV Siemens
- 2008–2009: KSC/FCB Donaustadt
- 2009–2015: FK Austria Wien
- 2014–2015: → Floridsdorfer AC (loan)

Senior career*
Years	Team	Apps	(Gls)
2015–2017	FK Austria Wien II	0	(0)
2015–2016	→ Floridsdorfer AC (loan)	0	(0)
2017–2018	Floridsdorfer AC	1	(0)
2017	→ 1. Simmeringer SC (loan)	3	(0)
- * Club domestic league appearances and goals as of 17 November 2017

Nikolai Vambersky (born 8 March 1997) is an Austrian football player of Russian descent.

== Club career ==
He made his Austrian Football First League debut for Floridsdorfer AC on 11 August 2017 in a game against SC Wiener Neustadt.
