= Michael Augustin =

Austrian footballer (born 1996)

Personal information
- Date of birth: 26 April 1996 (age 30)
- Place of birth: Austria
- Height: 1.73 m (5 ft 8 in)
- Position: Midfielder

Team information
- Current team: SC Schwaz (on loan from FC Wacker Innsbruck)
- Number: 4

Youth career
- 2003–2011: SV Telfs
- 2011–2013: AKA Tirol

Senior career*
| Years | Team | Apps | (Gls) |
| 2013– | FC Wacker Innsbruck II | 78 | (24) |
| 2015– | FC Wacker Innsbruck | 2 | (1) |
| 2017– | → SC Schwaz (loan) | 6 | (1) |

International career
| 2012–2013 | Austria U17 | 10 | (1) |
- * Club domestic league appearances and goals as of 30 April 2017 (UTC)

Michael Augustin (born 26 April 1996) is an Austrian footballer who plays for SC Schwaz on loan from FC Wacker Innsbruck.
