= Daniel Raischl =

German footballer

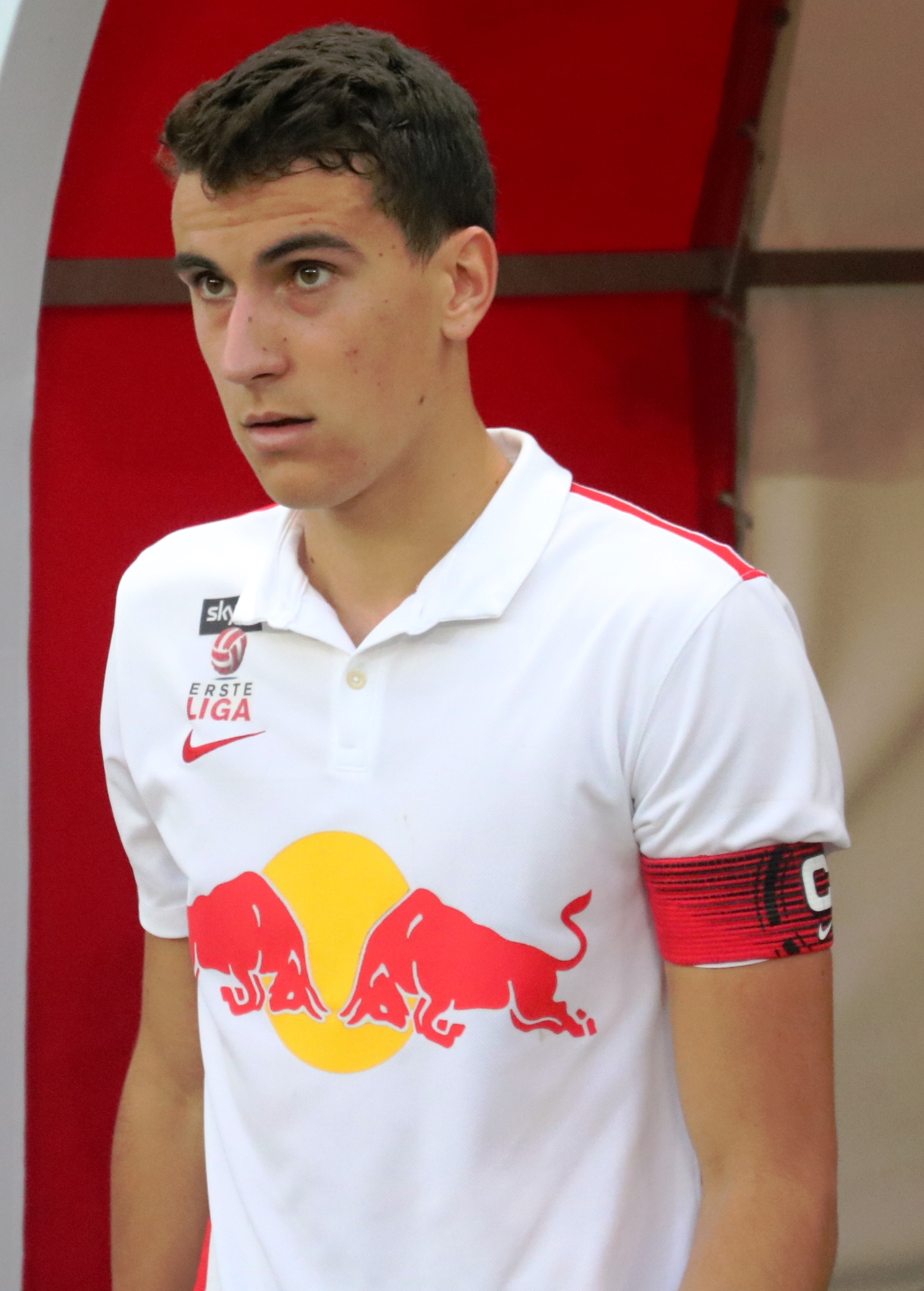
- Raischl in 2016

Personal information
- Date of birth: 19 March 1997 (age 29)
- Height: 1.88 m (6 ft 2 in)
- Position: Defender

Team information
- Current team: SAK 1914

Youth career
- –2016: Red Bull Salzburg

Senior career*
Years	Team	Apps	(Gls)
2014–2017	FC Liefering	21	(0)
2017–2018	Floridsdorfer AC	43	(0)
2018–2019	ATSV Stadl-Paura	24	(0)
2019–2020	SAK 1914	18	(6)
2020–2021	FC Pinzgau Saalfelden	13	(0)
2021–	SAK 1914	47	(3)
- * Club domestic league appearances and goals as of 1 July 2023

Daniel Raischl (born 19 March 1997) is a German professional footballer who plays as a defender for Austrian club SAK 1914.
