= Kevin Brandstätter =

Austrian footballer

Personal information
- Date of birth: 8 January 1996 (age 30)
- Place of birth: Schwanenstadt, Austria
- Height: 1.75 m (5 ft 9 in)
- Position: Midfielder

Team information
- Current team: Vorwärts Steyr
- Number: 22

Youth career
- 2002–2010: SC Schwanenstadt
- 2010–2014: AKA Linz

Senior career*
Years	Team	Apps	(Gls)
2014	LASK Linz	1	(0)
2014–2017	SV Ried	0	(0)
2017	→ Blau-Weiß Linz (loan)	4	(0)
2017–2019	Blau-Weiß Linz	19	(0)
2019–	Vorwärts Steyr	4	(1)
- * Club domestic league appearances and goals as of 16:06, 22 August 2019 (UTC)

Kevin Brandstätter (born 8 January 1996 as Kevin Metze) is an Austrian football player. He plays for SK Vorwärts Steyr.

== Club career ==
He made his Austrian Football First League debut for FC Blau-Weiß Linz on 14 March 2017 in a game against Floridsdorfer AC.
