= Lukas Grill (footballer, born 1991) =

Austrian footballer

Personal information
- Date of birth: 19 November 1991 (age 34)
- Place of birth: Wien, Austria
- Height: 1.83 m (6 ft 0 in)
- Position: Midfielder

Team information
- Current team: SV Gloggnitz
- Number: 22

Youth career
- 1997–2002: SV Hirschstetten
- 2002–2009: FC Stadlau

Senior career*
Years	Team	Apps	(Gls)
2009–2010	FC Stadlau		
2010	SC Mannsdorf		
2010–2013	SC Leopoldsdorf/Mfd		
2013–2014	SC Mannsdorf	9	(1)
2014–2015	Wiener SC	42	(13)
2015–2016	Austria Lustenau	26	(0)
2016–2017	Floridsdorfer AC	7	(0)
2017	SC Mannsdorf	6	(1)
2017	→ SV Stripfing (loan)	10	(0)
2018	Kremser SC	7	(1)
2018–2019	SC Leopoldsdorf/Mfd.	33	(9)
2020–	SV Gloggnitz	7	(8)
- * Club domestic league appearances and goals as of 23:23, 16 January 2021 (UTC)

Lukas Grill (born 19 November 1991) is an Austrian footballer who currently plays as a midfielder for SV Gloggnitz.
