= Michael Berger =

Austrian footballer

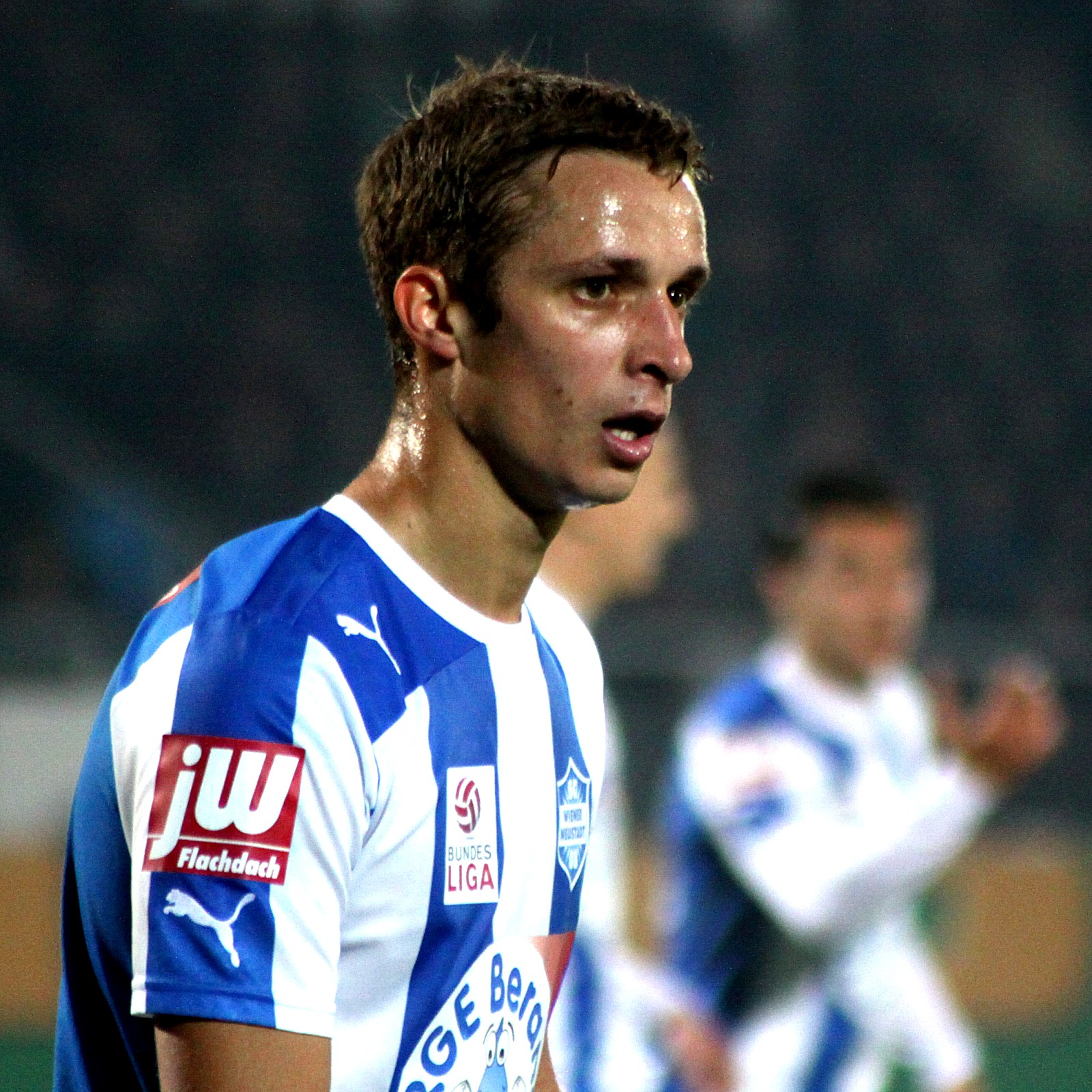

Personal information
- Date of birth: 1 December 1990 (age 35)
- Place of birth: Austria
- Position: Defender

Team information
- Current team: SV Allerheiligen

Senior career*
| Years | Team | Apps | (Gls) |
| 2009–2011 | Grazer AK | 63 | (2) |
| 2012–2014 | SC Wiener Neustadt | 29 | (0) |
| 2014–2017 | Wolfsberger AC | 27 | (1) |
| 2017 | Floridsdorfer AC | 12 | (1) |
| 2017– | SV Allerheiligen | 12 | (0) |
- * Club domestic league appearances and goals as of 29 September 2017

Michael Berger (born 1 December 1990) is an Austrian footballer who plays for SV Allerheiligen.
