= Goran Kreso =

Austrian footballer

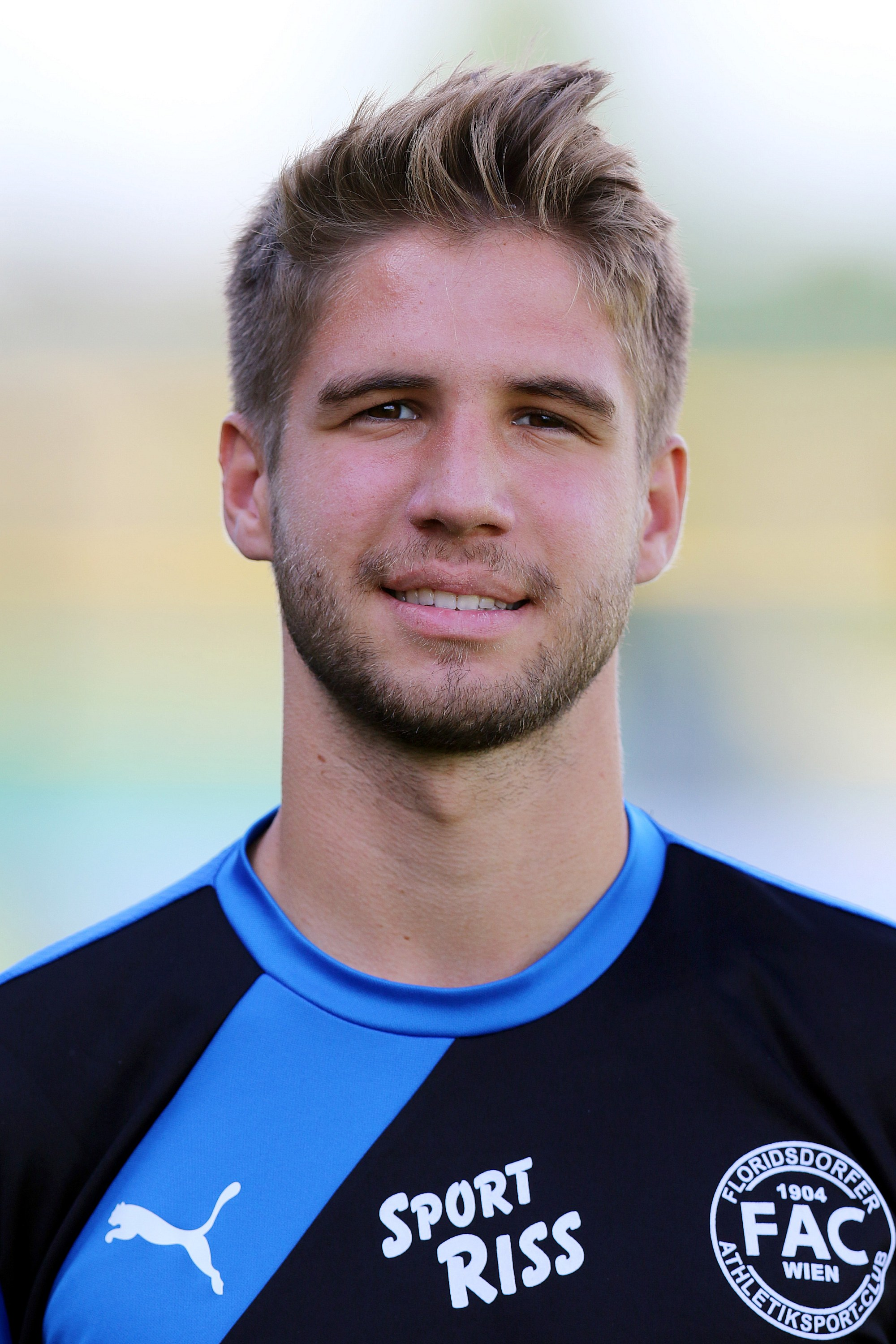

Personal information
- Date of birth: 28 March 1994 (age 32)
- Position: Left-back

Team information
- Current team: Bisamberg 1. FC
- Number: 5

Youth career
- 2001–2003: Red Star Penzing
- 2003–2008: FavAC
- 2008–2012: Red Bull Salzburg

Senior career*
Years	Team	Apps	(Gls)
2012	Red Bull Salzburg Jr.	1	(0)
2012–2013	FC Liefering	0	(0)
2013–2015	Rapid Wien II	39	(0)
2015–2016	SV Horn	7	(0)
2016–2017	FAC	7	(0)
2017	ASK Ebreichsdorf	5	(0)
2017–2019	Leobendorf SV	47	(6)
2019–2020	SC Sparkasse Korneuburg	13	(2)
2020–	Bisamberg 1. FC	40	(1)
- * Club domestic league appearances and goals as of 17:02, 30 December 2024 (UTC)

Goran Kreso (born 28 March 1994) is an Austrian footballer who plays for Bisamberg 1. FC.
