= Jacobo Ynclán =

Spanish footballer

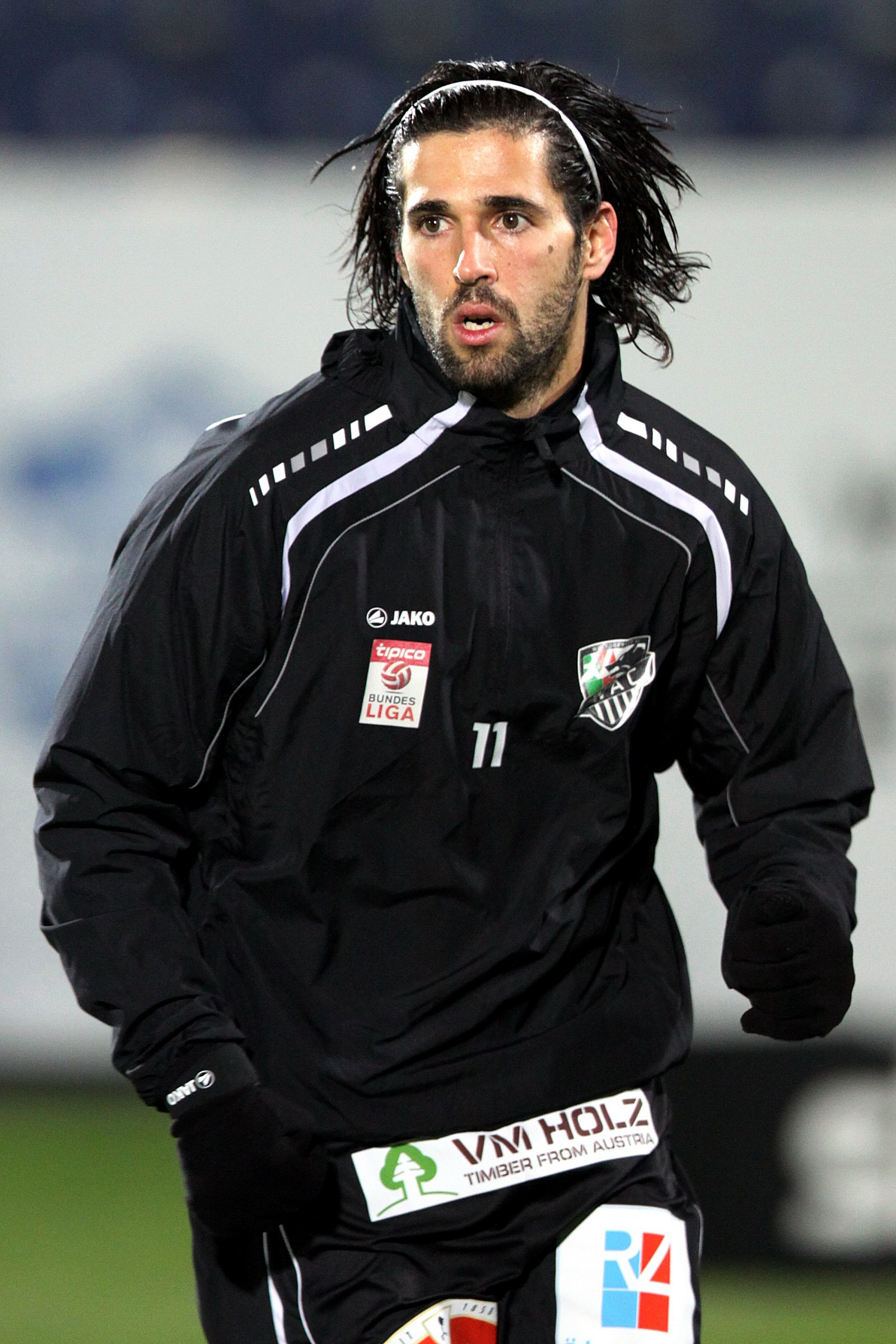
- Jacobo as a Wolfsberger AC player (2014)

Personal information
- Full name: Jacobo María Ynclán Pajares
- Date of birth: 4 February 1984 (age 42)
- Place of birth: Madrid, Spain
- Height: 1.80 m (5 ft 11 in)
- Position: Midfielder

Youth career
- Atlético Madrid

Senior career*
Years	Team	Apps	(Gls)
2003–2007	Atlético Madrid B	32	(12)
2005	→ Poli Ejido (loan)	16	(1)
2005–2006	→ Lleida (loan)	34	(1)
2007–2008	Atlético Madrid	1	(0)
2007–2008	→ Mouscron (loan)		
2008–2009	Alavés	6	(0)
2009–2010	Guadalajara	27	(3)
2010–2011	Alcalá	35	(13)
2011–2017	Wolfsberger AC	169	(34)
2018	Atlético Pinto	13	(0)
- * Club domestic league appearances and goals as of 9 December 2018

Jacobo María Ynclán Pajares (born 4 February 1984), sometimes known simply as Jacobo, is a Spanish former professional footballer who played as a midfielder.

== Club career ==
Born in Madrid, Jacobo played once for Atlético Madrid's first team, coming on as a substitute for Luciano Galletti in injury time of a 3–1 La Liga away win against RC Celta de Vigo on 14 January 2007, but his career was spent mainly in the lower divisions – he also spent one season in Belgium loaned to R.E. Mouscron, before being definitely released by the Colchoneros on 30 June 2008.

In the following three years, Jacobo represented Deportivo Alavés, CD Guadalajara and RSD Alcalá, the first team in the second division and the other two in the third. He appeared in only six matches out of a possible 42 with the former club, with the campaign also ending in relegation.

Jacobo signed for Austria's Wolfsberger AC in the summer of 2011. He scored a career-best 14 goals from 34 appearances in his first year, helping to promotion to the Austrian Football Bundesliga.
