= Mario Leitgeb =

Austrian footballer (born 1988)

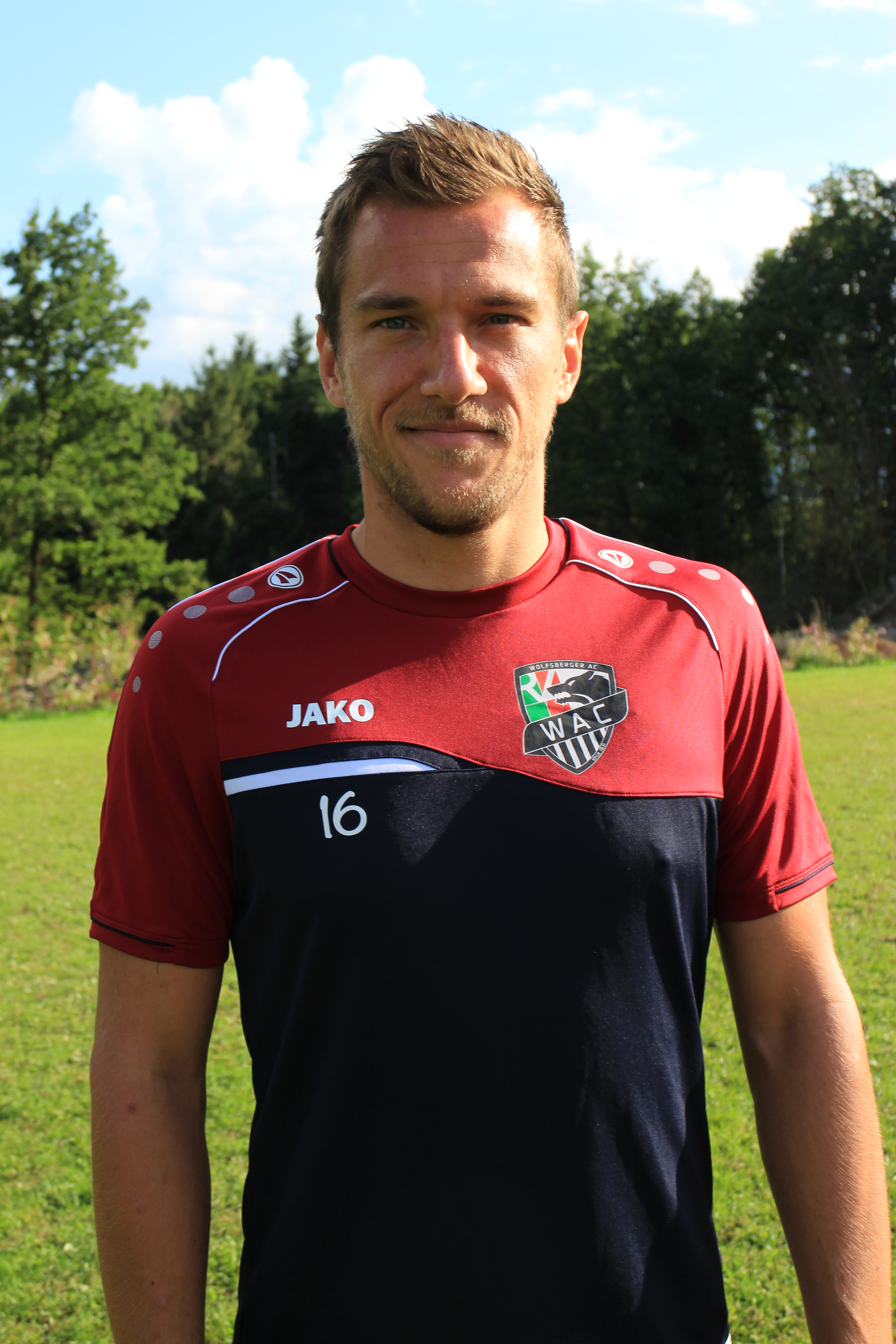
- Leitgeb in 2018

Personal information
- Date of birth: 30 June 1988 (age 38)
- Place of birth: Graz, Austria
- Height: 1.83 m (6 ft 0 in)
- Position: Midfielder

Team information
- Current team: DSV Leoben
- Number: 16

Youth career
- 1995–2006: Sturm Graz

Senior career*
Years	Team	Apps	(Gls)
2006–2008	SK Sturm Graz II	25	(1)
2008–2012	Austria Lustenau	89	(6)
2012	Grazer AK	10	(4)
2012–2014	SV Grödig	63	(7)
2014–2016	Austria Wien	26	(0)
2016–2017	St. Gallen	14	(1)
2017–2024	Wolfsberger AC	183	(12)
2024–	DSV Leoben	15	(1)

International career
2009	Austria U21	1	(0)
- * Club domestic league appearances and goals as of 28 December 2024

Mario Leitgeb (born 30 June 1988) is an Austrian professional footballer who plays as a midfielder for Austrian Regionalliga Central club DSV Leoben. He has one appearance for the Austrian under-21 team.

== Club career ==
=== Early career ===
Leitgeb started his career in the Styrian capital, playing for Sturm Graz. He played in the club's academy until 2006, where he was promoted to the reserve team. Between 2006 and 2008, Leitgeb played 25 matches for the reserves, scoring one goal. In 2008, he was picked up by SC Austria Lustenau from the second division. Leitgeb made his debut in the second division on 11 July 2008, in a 2–0 away loss to SV Grödig. In the second round of the regular season he made an own goal. During his time in Lustenau, he picked up 89 league appearances and made 10 additional appearances in the Austrian Cup. In the 36th minute of his first cup appearance, a match against FC Wels on 14 August 2008, he scored his first goal for the club. Austria Lustenau, however, lost 5–4 in a penalty shootout.

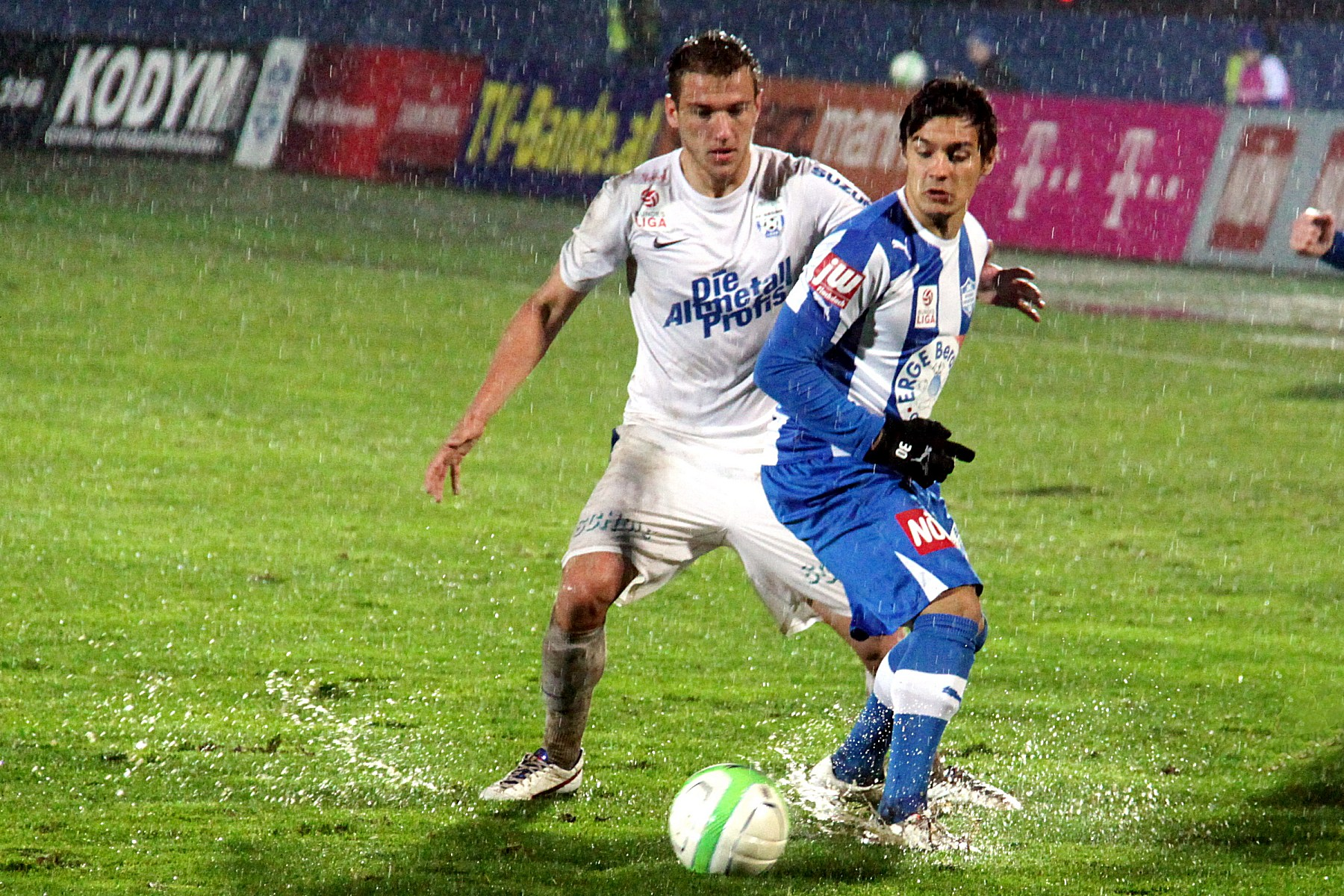
Leitgeb (white shirt) during a match against SC Wiener Neustadt (2013)

In the January transfer window of the 2011–12 season, Leitgeb was signed by Grazer AK, but left by mutual consent after only six months after the club failed to reach promomotion to the Austrian Bundesliga. Instead, he continued his career with SV Grödig, where he played 63 league matches in two seasons. On 12 June 2014, Leitgeb signed a three-year contract with Austria Wien for an undisclosed fee.

After initially having signed a precontract with former club Sturm Graz in January 2016, Leitgeb joined Swiss club FC St. Gallen on a six-month contract.

=== Wolfsberger AC ===
In January 2017 Leitgeb returned to Austria, signing with Bundesliga-side Wolfsberger AC on a one-and-a-half-year deal. He signed a two-year contract extension with the club on 29 March 2019. On 19 September 2019, Leitgeb made his European debut in a UEFA Europa League group stage away match against German club Borussia Mönchengladbach. In what was described as a "miracle", he scored two headers against a passive Mönchengladbach-defense and thereby became a vital part in Wolfsberger's 4–0 thrashing.

=== DSV Leoben ===
On 18 June 2024, Leitgeb signed with a third-tier club DSV Leoben.
