= 2014–15 Austrian Cup =

2014–15 Austrian FA Cup
ÖFB Cup (German)

Tournament details
- Country: Austria
- Teams: 64

Final positions
- Champions: FC Red Bull Salzburg
- Runners-up: FK Austria Wien

Tournament statistics
- Matches played: 63
- Goals scored: 271 (4.3 per match)
- Top goal scorer(s): Jonathan Soriano (7); Marcel Sabitzer (7); Alan (7)

The 2014–15 Austrian Cup (German: ÖFB-Samsung-Cup) was the 81st season of Austria's nationwide football cup competition. It commenced with the matches of the First Round on 11 July 2014 and ended on 3 June 2015.

== First round ==
The matches took place between 11 and 16 July 2014.

11 July 2014	Hard (3)	1–2	Ritzing (3)	Hard
19:00	Fleisch 23' (pen.)		Pavec 16'; Micanovic 83'	Stadium: Waldstadion Hard; Attendance: 200; Referee: Andreas Heiß

11 July 2014	ATSV Wolfsberg (3)	2–1	Dornbirn (3)	Wolfsberg
20:00	Prašnikar 7'; Heine 49'		Alibabic 12'	Stadium: A.T.S.V. Arena; Attendance: 260; Referee: Aldin Hasanovic

11 July 2014	Kalsdorf (3)	2–2 (a.e.t.) (3–4 p)	Hartberg (2)	Kalsdorf bei Graz
20:00	Dorn 30'; Hackinger 106'		Löffler 42'; Rotter 93'	Stadium: Sportzentrum Kalsdorf; Attendance: 500; Referee: Christian-Petru Ciochirca
	Penalties
	Dorn (penalty scored); Miedl (penalty scored); Radakovics (penalty scored); Rother (penalty missed); Tauschmann (penalty missed); Weinberger (penalty missed)		(penalty scored) Fröschl; (penalty missed) Kröpfl; (penalty scored) Sencar; (penalty missed) Löffler; (penalty scored) Rasswalder; (penalty scored) Friesenbichler

11 July 2014	Parndorf (3)	2–3	Ried (1)	Parndorf
20:00	Kienzl 34'; Kummerer 69' (pen.)		Elsneg 34' (pen.); Pichler 40'; Ziegl 54'	Stadium: Heidebodenstadion; Attendance: 600; Referee: Markus Katona

11 July 2014	Schwaz (3)	1–4	Sturm Graz (1)	Schwaz
20:00	Vogler 54'		Djuricin 25', 67', 90'; Beichler 72'	Stadium: Silberstadt Arena Schwaz; Attendance: 1,500; Referee: Sebastian Gishamer

11 July 2014	Seekirchen (3)	1–4	LASK Linz (2)	Seekirchen am Wallersee
20:00	Rösslhuber 62'		Blutsch 48'; Fábio 51'; Hieblinger 70'; Templ 86'	Stadium: Sportzentrum Seekirchen; Attendance: 600; Referee: Helmut Trattnig

11 July 2014	Wallern (3)	1–1 (a.e.t.) (5–3 p)	Union St. Florian (3)	Wallern an der Trattnach
20:00	Markovic 107'		Preuer 117'	Stadium: Sportplatz SV Zaunergroup Wallern; Attendance: 250; Referee: Christoph Schnetzer
	Penalties
	Akin (penalty scored); Gas (penalty scored); Markovic (penalty scored); Kirschner (penalty scored); Dandic (penalty scored)		(penalty scored) Mayr; (penalty missed) Falkner; (penalty scored) Idrizaj; (penalty scored) Buchegger

11 July 2014	Wattens (3)	2–4 (a.e.t.)	Altach (1)	Wattens
20:00	Wildauer 40'; Steinlechner 116'		Lienhart 44'; Pecirep 105', 113'; Kovačec 119'	Stadium: Gernot Langes Stadion; Attendance: 900; Referee: Christian Rigler

11 July 2014	Weiz (3)	2–4	Wolfsberger AC (1)	Weiz
20:00	Durlacher 37'; Riegler 87'		Ynclán 3'; Žulj 43' (pen.), 88'; Seebacher 51'	Stadium: SIEMENS Energy Stadion; Attendance: 652; Referee: Alan Kijas

11 July 2014	Austria Klagenfurt (3)	1–3	Vorwärts Steyr (3)	Klagenfurt
20:30	Vinko 35'		Peham 20', 90+2'; Petrovic 85'	Stadium: Sportpark Klagenfurt; Attendance: 350; Referee: Rene Eisner

11 July 2014	Amstetten (3)	0–1 (a.e.t.)	Rapid Wien (1)	Amstetten
20:30			Dibon 116'	Stadium: Ertl Glas-Stadion; Attendance: 3,000; Referee: Andreas Feichtinger

11 July 2014	Kottingbrunn (4)	0–7	Kapfenberg (2)	Kottingbrunn
20:30			Grgić 32'; Bubalović 45'; Bahtić 56', 61'; Perchtold 63'; Ronivaldo 78', 89'	Stadium: Stadion Kottingbrunn; Attendance: 150; Referee: Habip Tekeli

11 July 2014	Lendorf (4)	0–7	Admira Wacker Mödling (1)	Lendorf
20:30			Thürauer 35'; Bajrami 52'; Ebner 59'; Ouédraogo 63'; Auer 73'; Nagy 74' (o.g.); Schick 80'	Stadium: Thomas-Morgenstern-Arena; Attendance: 700; Referee: Bernd Eigler

11 July 2014	Schwechat (3)	1–4	FAC Team für Wien (2)	Schwechat
20:30	Palalic 18'		Pittnauer 25'; Duran 39', 84'; Bauer 48'	Stadium: Rudolf-Tonn-Stadion; Attendance: 300; Referee: Andreas Heidenreich

11 July 2014	First Vienna (3)	0–6	Austria Wien (1)	Vienna
21:00			Harrer 23'; Royer 37', 53'; Gorgon 60'; Kienast 70'; Grünwald 86'	Stadium: Hohe Warte Stadium; Attendance: 3,950; Referee: Gerhard Grobelnik

12 July 2014	Sollenau (3)	1–10	Red Bull Salzburg (1)	Sollenau
16:00	Vuković 38'		Mané 19'; Alan 24', 36', 62', 70'; Soriano 32', 35'; Sabitzer 81', 89'; Ulmer 87'	Stadium: Sportplatz; Attendance: 2,100; Referee: Julian Weinberger

12 July 2014	Ober–Grafendorf (3)	1–4	Lankowitz (5)	Ober-Grafendorf
16:30	Adamec 90'		Brauneis 21', 30', 31'; Puntigam 83'	Stadium: Sportplatz Ober-Grafendorf; Attendance: 300; Referee: Clemens Schüttengruber

12 July 2014	Höchst (3)	1–2	Mattersburg (2)	Höchst
17:00	Caner 67'		Pink 44'; Mahrer 90+4'	Stadium: Rheinaustadion; Attendance: 350; Referee: Walter Altmann

12 July 2014	Kitzbühel (3)	5–1	Retz (4)	Kitzbühel
17:00	Matondo 63', 86' (pen.), 88'; Schmid 65', 90'		Nekuda 52'	Stadium: Sportplatz Langau; Attendance: 500; Referee: Michael Baumann

12 July 2014	Micheldorf (4)	2–1	Allerheiligen (3)	Micheldorf
18:30	Gotthartsleitner 45', 60'		Hopfer 80'	Stadium: Cool&fair Arena; Attendance: 200; Referee: Johannes Pummerer

12 July 2014	SAK Klagenfurt (3)	1–4	Lafnitz (3)	Klagenfurt
18:30	Riedl 77' (pen.)		Kölbl 10' (pen.); Rossmann 13'; Friedl 52'; Bešlić 55'	Stadium: SAK-Sportpark Welzenegg; Attendance: 200; Referee: Stefan Kühr

12 July 2014	Neusiedl am See (3)	5–1	Neumarkt am Wallersee (3)	Parndorf
18:30	Feraru 29'; Tomcak 31' (pen.), 62', 78'; Enguelle 70'		Mayer 49'	Stadium: Heidebodenstadion; Attendance: 300; Referee: Maximilian Kolbitsch

12 July 2014	Donaufeld Wien (3)	1–3 (a.e.t.)	Wacker Innsbruck (2)	Vienna
17:00	Sulc 48'		Hölzl 61'; Bergmann 106'; Zangerl 117'	Stadium: Donaufeldplatz; Attendance: 700; Referee: Markus Hameter

12 July 2014	Wimpassing (4)	0–3	Horn (2)	Wimpassing an der Leitha
17:00			Kröpfl 16', 46', 81'	Stadium: Sportplatz; Attendance: 600; Referee: Robert Steinacher

12 July 2014	St. Johann im Pongau (3)	3–0	Spratzern (4)	St Johann im Pongau
17:30	Srećo 24', 58'; Barnjak 39'			Stadium: Sportplatz St. Johann; Attendance: 300; Referee: Markus Winkler

12 July 2014	Union Gurten (3)	0–6	Wiener Neustadt (1)	Gurten
17:30			Rauter 1', 56'; Koch 20', 51'; Pichlmann 53', 89' (pen.)	Stadium: Park21-Arena; Attendance: 550; Referee: Christopher Jäger

12 July 2014	Hohenems (4)	5–1	Eugendorf (3)	Hohenems
17:00	A. Klammer 14', 19', 36'; Feuerstein 40'; J. Klammer 90+3'		Bošnjak 5'	Stadium: Herrenriedstadion; Attendance: 300; Referee: Gregor Danler

12 July 2014	Wiener SK (3)	3–2	Austria Lustenau (2)	Vienna
17:00	Yunes 54', 84'; Pollack 74'		Thiago 47'; Tadić 94'	Stadium: Sportclub-Platz; Attendance: 946; Referee: Andreas Kollegger

13 July 2014	Landhaus Wien (4)	0–8	St. Pölten (2)	Vienna
16:30			Holzmann 18'; Segovia 32'; Schibany 44'; Hartl 55'; Noël 68', 82', 88'; Fucik 79'	Stadium: Sportplatz Nord-Wien; Attendance: 220; Referee: Alexander Harkam

13 July 2014	Gleisdorf (4)	1–2	Kufstein (3)	Gleisdorf
10:30	Färber 58'		Baydar 79'; Achorner 90'	Stadium: Solarstadion; Attendance: 200; Referee: Roland Braunschmidt

13 July 2014	Leobendorf (4)	1–7	Grödig (1)	Leobendorf
16:45	Konrad 72'		Gschweidl 25'; Nutz 32'; Reyna 34'; Huspek 49'; Wallner 63'; Tomi 65'; Djurić 90+2'	Stadium: SV-Sportplatz; Attendance: 500; Referee: Manuel Schüttengruber

16 July 2014	Austria Salzburg (3)	2–0	Blau-Weiß Linz (3)	Vöcklabruck
19:33	Bammer 28'; Sommer 90'			Stadium: Volksbank-Stadion; Attendance: 3,000; Referee: Harald Lechner

== Second round ==
The matches took place between 22 and 24 September 2014.

22 September 2014	Lankowitz (5)	0–3	LASK Linz (2)	Lankowitz
19:00			Vujanović 38', 60', 80'	Stadium: Sportplatz Lankowitz; Attendance: 1,480; Referee: Helmut Trattnig

23 September 2014	ATSV Wolfsberg (3)	0–3	Wacker Innsbruck (2)	Wolfsberg
19:00	Prasnikar 7'; Heine 50'		Zangerl 48', 66', 75'	Stadium: ATSV Arena; Attendance: 260; Referee: Aldin Hasanovic

23 September 2014	Kufstein (3)	1–6	FAC Team für Wien (2)	Kufstein
19:00	Mayerl 67'		Herbst 28'; Mössner 34'; Pittnauer 47'; Haselberger 60'; Stehlik 81', 87'	Stadium: Kufstein Arena; Attendance: 200; Referee: Robert Schörgenhofer

23 September 2014	Micheldorf (4)	0–4	Mattersburg (2)	Micheldorf
18:30			Hsani 13' (o.g.); Erhardt 29'; Majstorović 71' (pen.); Klemen 88'	Stadium: Cool&fair Arena; Attendance: 550; Referee: Markus Katona

23 September 2014	Neusiedl am See (3)	1–4	Kapfenberg (2)	Neusiedl am See
19:00	Bubalović 21' (o.g.)		Lasnik 17' (pen.); Bahtić 20'; Grgić 83'; Witteveen 88'	Stadium: Sportzentrum Neusiedl; Attendance: 450; Referee: Andreas Feichtinger

23 September 2014	Ritzing (3)	2–0	Horn (2)	Ritzing
19:00	Hofer 36'; Milosevic 81'			Stadium: Sonnensee Stadion; Attendance: 150; Referee: Gerhard Grobelnik

23 September 2014	Austria Salzburg (3)	0–5	Sturm Graz (1)	Vöcklabruck
20:30			Djuricin 22', 38', 92'; Schick 64'; Beichler 76'	Stadium: Volksbank-Stadion; Attendance: 4,500; Referee: Andreas Heiss

23 September 2014	Lafnitz (3)	0–2	Hartberg (2)	Lafnitz
19:00			Sencar 55'; Edomwonyi 63'	Stadium: Sportplatz Lafnitz; Attendance: 3,000; Referee: Christian-Petru Ciochirca

23 September 2014	Ried (1)	0–1	Wolfsberger AC (1)	Ried im Innkreis
19:00			Jacobo 88'	Stadium: Keine Sorgen Arena; Attendance: 1,700; Referee: Rene Eisner

23 September 2014	St. Johann im Pongau (3)	1–1 (a.e.t.) (6–7 p)	St. Pölten (2)	St Johann im Pongau
19:00	Pertl 51' (pen.)		Segovia 11'	Stadium: Sportplatz St. Johann; Attendance: 300; Referee: Bernd Eigler
	Penalties
	Barnjak (penalty missed); Pertl (penalty scored); Hupf (penalty scored); Krimbacher (penalty scored); Sahin (penalty scored); Gruber (penalty missed); Eder (penalty scored); Klammer (penalty scored); Waltl (penalty missed)		(penalty scored) Ambichl; (penalty scored) Kerschbaumer; (penalty missed) Holzmann; (penalty scored) Parada; (penalty scored) Noël; (penalty missed) Hofbauer; (penalty scored) Hartl; (penalty scored) Grasegger; (penalty scored) Wisio

23 September 2014	Vorwärts Steyr (3)	0–2	Grödig (1)	Steyr
19:00			Nutz 54' (pen.); Djuric 80'	Stadium: Vorwärts Stadium; Attendance: 1,500; Referee: Julian Weinberger

24 September 2014	Kitzbühel (3)	0–5	Austria Wien (1)	Kitzbühel
18:30			Grünwald 16', 22'; Damari 30'; Mader 56'; Harrer 88'	Stadium: Sportplatz Langau; Attendance: 1,623; Referee: Oliver Drachta

24 September 2014	Wiener Neustadt (1)	2–2 (a.e.t.) (5–3 p)	Admira Wacker Mödling (1)	Wiener Neustadt
19:00	Koch 27'; Deutschmann 68'		Ouedraogo 34'; Katzer 82'	Stadium: Stadion Wiener Neustadt; Attendance: 1,367; Referee: Markus Hameter
	Penalties
	O'Brien (penalty scored); Koch (penalty scored); Deutschmann (penalty scored); Schöpf (penalty scored); Rauter (penalty scored)		(penalty scored) Schößwendtner; (penalty scored) Schicker; (penalty missed) Domoraud; (penalty scored) Windbichler

24 September 2014	Wallern (3)	0–1	Rapid Wien (1)	Pasching
18:00			Prosenik 29'	Stadium: Waldstadion; Attendance: 2,700; Referee: Christopher Jäger

24 September 2014	Hohenems (4)	0–5	Altach (1)	Hohenems
18:30			Tajouri 6'; Ngwat–Mahop 48', 63'; Aigner 67'; Seeger 73'	Stadium: Herrenriedstadion; Attendance: 2,500; Referee: Dominik Ouschan

24 September 2014	Wiener SK (3)	1–12	Red Bull Salzburg (1)	Vienna
20:30	Pollack 32'		Sabitzer 6', 37'; Soriano 21', 75'; Alan 35', 53', 55'; Kampl 60'; Leitgeb 72'; Bruno 80'; Quaschner 86'; Soura 88' (o.g.)	Stadium: Sportclub-Platz; Attendance: 6,200; Referee: Christian Dintar

== Third round ==
The matches took place between 28 and 29 October 2014.

28 October 2014	Ritzing (3)	1–3	FAC Team für Wien (2)	Ritzing
19:30	Rakowitz 9'		Demic 78'; Pittnauer 82', 90+2'	Stadium: Sonnensee Stadion; Attendance: 300; Referee: Helmut Trattnig

28 October 2014	Hartberg (2)	0–6	Austria Wien (1)	Hartberg
19:30			Ortlechner 2'; Salamon 21'; Leitgeb 41'; Damari 48'; Grünwald 51' (pen.); Harrer 70'	Stadium: Stadion Hartberg; Attendance: 2,000; Referee: Manuel Schüttengruber

28 October 2014	Wolfsberger AC (1)	3–2	Wiener Neustadt (1)	Wolfsberg
18:30	Simon 11'; Schwendinger 56'; Sušac 72' (o.g.)		Ranftl 37'; Tieber 66'	Stadium: Lavanttal-Arena; Attendance: 2,100; Referee: Andreas Kollegger

29 October 2014	Kapfenberg (2)	5–3	LASK Linz (2)	Kapfenberg
18:30	Ronivaldo 18', 41', 67'; Wendler 42'; Nwamora 73'		Vujanović 9', 21' (pen.); Hinum 35'	Stadium: Franz Fekete Stadium; Attendance: 500; Referee: Sebastian Gishamer

29 October 2014	Rapid Wien (1)	1–0	Sturm Graz (1)	Vienna
20:30	Schwab 5'			Stadium: Ernst-Happel-Stadion; Attendance: 7,835; Referee: Markus Hameter

29 October 2014	Altach (1)	1–1 (a.e.t.) (4–2 p)	Mattersburg (2)	Altach
18:30	Kovačec 55'		Prietl 37'	Stadium: Cashpoint Arena; Attendance: 2,500; Referee: Andreas Heiss
	Penalties
	Salomon (penalty scored); Lienhart (penalty scored); Kovačec (penalty scored); Seeger (penalty scored)		(penalty scored) Malic; (penalty missed) Röcher; (penalty scored) Mahrer; (penalty missed) Höller

29 October 2014	St. Pölten (2)	0–1	Grödig (1)	St. Pölten
19:00			Huspek 22'	Stadium: NV Arena; Attendance: 1,350; Referee: Gerhard Grobelnik

29 October 2014	Wacker Innsbruck (2)	1–2 (a.e.t.)	Red Bull Salzburg (1)	Innsbruck
18:00	Bergmann 107'		Kampl 97'; Roguljić 108'	Stadium: Tivoli; Attendance: 2,092; Referee: Dominik Ouschan

== Quarter-finals ==
The matches took place on 7 and 8 April 2015.

7 April 2015	Kapfenberg (2)	0–2	Austria Wien (1)	Kapfenberg
20:30			de Paula 2'; Kvasina 77'	Stadium: Franz Fekete Stadium; Attendance: 2,000; Referee: Christopher Jäger

7 April 2015	Grödig (1)	2–1	FAC Team für Wien (2)	Grödig
18:30	Gschweidl 15'; Nutz 39'		Duran 34'	Stadium: Das.Goldberg Stadion; Attendance: 974; Referee: Andreas Heiss

7 April 2015	Wolfsberger AC (1)	2–1	Rapid Wien (1)	Wolfsberg
18:00	Kerhe 25'; Wernitznig 28'		Schobesberger 90+4'	Stadium: Lavanttal-Arena; Attendance: 3,600; Referee: Oliver Drachta

8 April 2015	Altach (1)	0–4	Red Bull Salzburg (1)	Altach
20:30			Sabitzer 4', 32'; Soriano 34', 79'	Stadium: Cashpoint Arena; Attendance: 6,174; Referee: Manuel Schüttengruber

== Semi-finals ==
The matches took place on 28 and 29 April 2015.

28 April 2015	Grödig (1)	0–2	Red Bull Salzburg (1)	Grödig
18:00			Quaschner 74'; Sabitzer 78'	Stadium: Das.Goldberg Stadion; Attendance: 1,890; Referee: Harald Lechner

29 April 2015	Wolfsberger AC (1)	0–3	Austria Wien (1)	Wolfsberg
20:30			Rotpuller 64'; Leitgeb 67'; Holland 72'	Stadium: Lavanttal-Arena; Attendance: 4,200; Referee: Robert Schörgenhofer

== Final ==
The final was played on 3 June 2015 at the Wörthersee Stadion in Klagenfurt.

=== Details ===
3 June 2015
20:30

Austria Wien	0–2 (a.e.t.)	Red Bull Salzburg
	Report	Soriano 95'; Pires 108'

Wörthersee Stadion, Klagenfurt
Attendance: 16,200
Referee: Oliver Drachta

GK	13	(Austria) Heinz Lindner
RB	30	(Austria) Fabian Koch
CB	33	(Austria) Lukas Rotpuller	(yellow card) 117' (red card) 120'
CB	19	(Czech Republic) Patrizio Stronati
LB	29	(Austria) Markus Suttner
CM	6	(Austria) Mario Leitgeb		(substituted off) 71'
CM	15	(Austria) Christian Ramsebner	(yellow card) 66'
RW	20	(Austria) Alexander Gorgon		(substituted off) 80'
AM	10	(Austria) Alexander Grünwald	(yellow card) 90'
LW	23	(Austria) David de Paula		(substituted off) 46'
CF	27	(Austria) Marko Kvasina
Substitutes:
GK	31	(Austria) Osman Hadžikić
DF	14	(Austria) Manuel Ortlechner
DF	35	(Austria) Thomas Salamon
MF	25	(Australia) James Holland	(yellow card) 86'	(substituted on) 71'
MF	17	(Austria) Florian Mader
LW	28	(Austria) Daniel Royer		(substituted on) 46'
CF	16	(Austria) Philipp Zulechner		(substituted on) 80'
Manager:
(Austria) Andreas Ogris

GK	31	(Hungary) Péter Gulácsi	(red card) 43'
RB	2	(Austria) Benno Schmitz	(yellow card) 93'
CB	36	(Austria) Martin Hinteregger
CB	45	(Croatia) Duje Ćaleta-Car
LB	4	(Denmark) Peter Ankersen
CM	5	(Brazil) André Ramalho	(yellow card) 90'
CM	8	(Guinea) Naby Keïta
RW	14	(Kosovo) Valon Berisha		(substituted off) 100'
LW	18	(Japan) Takumi Minamino		(substituted off) 43'
CF	7	(Austria) Marcel Sabitzer		(substituted off) 81'
CF	26	(Spain) Jonathan Soriano
Substitutes:
GK	33	(Germany) Alexander Walke		(substituted on) 43'
DF	28	(Denmark) Asger Sørensen
FW	9	(Austria) Marco Djuricin
LW	11	(Brazil) Felipe Pires	(yellow card) 109'	(substituted on) 81'
CF	42	(Germany) Nils Quaschner		(substituted on) 100'
Manager:
(Austria) Adi Hütter
