= 2015–16 Austrian Cup =

ÖFB Cup (German)

Tournament details
- Country: Austria
- Teams: 64

Final positions
- Champions: Red Bull Salzburg
- Runners-up: Admira Wacker Mödling

Tournament statistics
- Matches played: 32
- Goals scored: 139 (4.34 per match)
- Top goal scorer: Jonathan Soriano (10)

The 2015–16 Austrian Cup (German: ÖFB-Samsung-Cup) was the 82nd season of Austria's nationwide football cup competition. It began with the matches of the First Round on 17 July 2015 and ended on 20 May 2016 with the final at Wörthersee Stadion in Klagenfurt. Red Bull Salzburg won the title for the third consecutive time by beating Admira Wacker Mödling 5–0. As Salzburg had also won the 2015–16 Austrian Bundesliga and therefore qualified for the 2016–17 UEFA Champions League, the 2016–17 UEFA Europa League spot reserved for the cup winners went to the domestic league runners-up Rapid Wien.

== First round ==
The matches took place between 17 and 19 July 2015. The draw was made on 24 June 2015.

17 July 2015	1. SC Sollenau (3)	0–3	SV Mattersburg (1)	Sollenau
19:30		Report	Jano 38'; Sprangler 51'; Doleschal 72'	Stadium: Sportplatz; Attendance: 700; Referee: Dieter Muckenhammer

17 July 2015	FC Blau-Weiß Linz (3)	1–1 (a.e.t.) (4–5 p)	FC Wacker Innsbruck (2)	Linz
19:00	Markovic 23'	Report	Deutschmann 44'	Stadium: Donauparkstadion; Attendance: 1,149; Referee: Rene Eisner
	Penalties
	Rass (penalty scored); Krennmayr (penalty scored); Abraham (penalty missed); Schnabel (penalty scored); Vaschauner (penalty scored); Kelmendi (penalty missed)		Säumel (penalty missed); Mićić (penalty scored); Freitag (penalty scored); Deutschmann (penalty scored); Pichlmann (penalty scored); Hirschhofer (penalty scored)

17 July 2015	Kremser SC (4)	8–1	SC Trausdorf (5)	Krems
20:00	Fekete 15', 55'; Slavov 29', 34', 62', 80'; Schragner 51'; Fekete 85'	Report	Hanák 22'	Stadium: Sepp Doll-Stadion; Attendance: 370; Referee: Andreas Vodik

17 July 2015	SC Weiz (3)	1–5	SK Rapid Wien (1)	Weiz
19:00	Steiner 10'	Report	Kainz 2', 6'; Schobesberger 7'; Berić 68'; Friedl 87' (o.g.)	Stadium: Siemens Energy-Stadion; Attendance: 2,500; Referee: Oliver Drachta

17 July 2015	SC-ESV Parndorf 1919 (3)	2–7	LASK (2)	Parndorf
20:30	Silberbauer 6'; Rašić 15'	Report	Gartler 45', 57', 67', 82'; Kerhe 51'; Cabrera 56'; Fröschl 76'	Stadium: Heidebodenstadion; Attendance: 700; Referee: Markus Katona

17 July 2015	SKU Amstetten (3)	3–2 (a.e.t.)	ASK Kottingbrunn (4)	Amstetten
19:30	Wurm 63'; Vuković 85'; Lachmayr 94'	Report	Panny 40'; Nemetz 74'	Stadium: Ertl Glas-Stadion; Attendance: 903; Referee: Lukas Gnam

17 July 2015	USV Allerheiligen (3)	0–3	Kapfenberger SV (2)	Allerheiligen
19:00		Report	Lasnik 45+2'; Arimany 59'; Imbongo 93'	Stadium: Sportplatz; Attendance: 450; Referee: Robert Steinacher

17 July 2015	SV Horn (3)	2–0	SC Ritzing (3)	Horn
19:30	Đorđević 30' (pen.); Vujanović 51'	Report		Stadium: Waldviertel-Volksbank Arena; Attendance: 1,020; Referee: Josef Spurny

17 July 2015	SV Innsbruck (4)	0–15	SV Ried (1)	Innsbruck
19:00		Report	Murg 4', 28'; Fettner 14' (o.g.); Walch 17', 88'; Sikorski 30' (pen.), 31', 34', 59'; Niederkircher 54' (o.g.); Gavilán 72', 80', 81', 83'; Schubert 84'	Stadium: Sportplatz Wiesengasse; Attendance: 200; Referee: Robert Schörgenhofer

17 July 2015	SV Lafnitz (3)	1–2	SC Rheindorf Altach (1)	Lafnitz
19:00	Waldl 63'	Report	Aigner 32' (pen.); Zech 35'	Stadium: SV-Sportplatz; Attendance: 952; Referee: Helmut Trattnig

17 July 2015	SV Oberwart (3)	0–3	FK Austria Wien (1)	Oberwart
19:30		Report	Grünwald 32'; Gorgon 67'; Zulechner 85'	Stadium: Informstadion; Attendance: 2,500; Referee: Andreas Kollegger

17 July 2015	SV Wallern (3)	2–1	SK Vorwärts Steyr (3)	Wallern
19:00	Elgit 60'; Reinhart 65'	Report	Ileli 15'	Stadium: Sportplatz; Attendance: 600; Referee: Stefan Ebner

17 July 2015	First Vienna FC (3)	0–1	SC Wiener Neustadt (2)	Vienna
19:00		Report	Harrer 84'	Stadium: Hohe Warte; Attendance: 1,350; Referee: Manuel Schüttengruber

17 July 2015	Völkermarkter ST 1868 (4)	2–2 (a.e.t.) (3–4 p)	FC Lendorf (4)	Völkermarkt
19:00	Sauerschnig 58'; Mailänder 90+3'	Report	Kautz 76' (pen.); Scheiflinger 84'	Stadium: Lilienbergarena; Attendance: 200; Referee: Thomas Fröhlacher
	Penalties
	Presterl (penalty scored); Kudler (penalty missed); Kaltak (penalty missed); Mailänder (penalty scored); Riedl (penalty scored); Laschkolnig (penalty missed)		Allmayer (penalty scored); Huber (penalty scored); Zunder (penalty missed); Nagy (penalty missed); Kautz (penalty scored); Scheiflinger (penalty scored)

18 July 2015	ASK Ebreichsdorf (3)	4–0	SC Red Star Penzing (5)	Ebreichsdorf
17:00	Plattensteiner 4', 52'; Frithum 43'; Dvorak 65'	Report		Stadium: Sportzentrum; Attendance: 250; Referee: Habip Tekeli

18 July 2015	ATSV Stadl-Paura (3)	1–5	WSG Wattens (3)	Stadl-Paura
17:30	Gerner 19'	Report	Zangerl 20', 84', 88'; Gebauer 45+2'; Pranter 52'	Stadium: Maximilian Pagl-Stadion; Attendance: 350; Referee: Florian Jäger

18 July 2015	Deutschlandsberger SC (3)	0–7	FC Red Bull Salzburg (1)	Deutschlandsberg
17:00		Report	Soriano 12', 51', 77'; Djuricin 54', 58', 61'; Minamino 88'	Stadium: Koralmstadion; Attendance: 3,500; Referee: Markus Hameter

18 July 2015	FC Dornbirn (3)	0–2	SKN St. Pölten (2)	Dornbirn
18:00		Report	Segovia 2'; Thürauer 25'	Stadium: Birkenwiese; Attendance: 1,000; Referee: Andreas Heiss

18 July 2015	FC Höchst (4)	1–2	SV Seekirchen (3)	Höchst
18:00	Blum 62'	Report	Federer 34'; Taferner 46'	Stadium: Rheinaustadion; Attendance: 100; Referee: Stefan Gamper

18 July 2015	SC Golling (4)	0–6	Floridsdorfer AC (2)	Golling
17:00		Report	Mössner 7'; Frank 39', 47', 51'; Neulinger 42' (o.g.); Sütcü 77'	Stadium: Rabenstadion; Attendance: 200; Referee: Dominik Ouschan

18 July 2015	SV Leobendorf (4)	0–0 (a.e.t.) (4–5 p)	Wiener Sport-Club (3)	Leobendorf
17:00		Report		Stadium: Franz Haas-Stadion; Attendance: 700; Referee: Roland Braunschmidt
	Penalties
	Tokgöz (penalty missed); Konrad (penalty scored); Leuchtmann (penalty missed); Aue (penalty scored); Kalla (penalty scored); Marusa (penalty scored); Batoha (penalty missed)		Seckel (penalty scored); Pollack (penalty scored); Yunes (penalty missed); Dimov (penalty missed); Pittnauer (penalty scored); Csandl (penalty scored); Goll (penalty scored)

18 July 2015	SV Schwechat (3)	1–1 (a.e.t.) (2–4 p)	FC Admira Wacker Mödling (1)	Schwechat
19:00	Kracher 34'	Report	Zwierschitz 26'	Stadium: Rudolf Tonn-Stadion; Attendance: 300; Referee: Maximilian Kolbitsch
	Penalties
	Sandic (penalty scored); Svoboda (penalty scored); ? (penalty missed); Babic (penalty missed)		Ouédraogo (penalty scored); Neuhold (penalty scored); Zwierschitz (penalty scored); Grozurek (penalty scored)

18 July 2015	SC Schwarz-Weiß Bregenz (3)	0–1	FC Wels (4)	Bregenz
17:00		Report	Skrigic 79'	Stadium: Casinostadion; Attendance: 500; Referee: Markus Winkler

18 July 2015	TSV Hartberg (3)	0–6	SK Sturm Graz (1)	Hartberg
20:30		Report	Tadič 38', 42'; Dobras 48', 58'; Avdijaj 74'; Kienast 88'	Stadium: Profertil-Arena; Attendance: 3,640; Referee: Harald Lechner

18 July 2015	TSV Neumarkt (3)	0–3	FC Hard (3)	Neumarkt
17:00		Report	Schartner 4' (o.g.); Batir 73'; Mentin 92'	Stadium: Sportplatz; Attendance: 109; Referee: Andreas Feichtinger

18 July 2015	TSV St. Johann (3)	4–0	FC Kitzbühel (3)	St. Johann
18:00	Gruber 1'; Krimbacher 12', 41', 84'	Report		Stadium: Sportplatz; Attendance: 400; Referee: Felix Ouschan

18 July 2015	USC Eugendorf (3)	2–4 (a.e.t.)	SV Austria Salzburg (2)	Eugendorf
18:00	Finder 53'; Kopleder 87' (pen.)	Report	Huspek 47'; Hasanović 65'; Bingöl 94'; Grubeck 116'	Stadium: Sportzentrum; Attendance: 1,200; Referee: Julian Weinberger

18 July 2015	Union Gurten (3)	1–0	SV Grödig (1)	Gurten
16:00	Kreuzer 87'	Report		Stadium: Park21-Arena; Attendance: 702; Referee: Alan Kijas

19 July 2015	ASKÖ Köttmannsdorf (4)	0–6	Wolfsberger AC (1)	Köttmannsdorf
17:30		Report	Zulj 16', 85'; Baldauf 26'; Tschernegg 28', 73'; Seidl 74'	Stadium: ASKÖ-Sportplatz; Attendance: 1,400; Referee: Alexander Harkam

19 July 2015	Annabichler SV (3)	1–4	FC Stadlau (3)	Klagenfurt
10:30	Nukić 62'	Report	Stojiljković 9' (pen.); Emanuel Rajdl 35', 76'; Behounek 64'	Stadium: Sportplatz Annabichl; Attendance: 200; Referee: Aldin Hasanovic

19 July 2015	FC Piberstein Lankowitz (5)	3–1	SC Austria Lustenau (2)	Lankowitz
16:00	Nöst 50'; Brauneis 64', 95' (pen.)	Report	Sobkova 75'	Stadium: Sportplatz; Attendance: 680; Referee: Sebastian Gishamer

19 July 2015	SVG Reichenau (3)	1–4	SK Austria Klagenfurt (2)	Kematen
16:00	Gstrein 72'	Report	Falk 18'; Zachhuber 39'; Koch 68'; Rep 89' (pen.)	Stadium: Sportplatz; Attendance: 200; Referee: Christopher Jäger

== Second round ==
The matches took place on 22 and 23 September 2015. The draw was made on 2 August 2015.

22 September 2015	ASK Ebreichsdorf (3)	3–1	SC Wiener Neustadt (2)	Ebreichsdorf
18:30	Bauer 20'; Anderst 79'; Höfel 90'	Report	Sittsam 32' (pen.)	Stadium: Sportzentrum; Attendance: 1,200; Referee: Alan Kijas

22 September 2015	FC Hard (3)	1–4	SKN St. Pölten (2)	Hard
16:00	Santin 9'	Report	Mader 10'; Stec 19'; Ambichl 33'; Jefferson 56'	Stadium: Waldstadion; Attendance: 250; Referee: Walter Altmann

22 September 2015	FC Lendorf (4)	0–5	SV Austria Salzburg (2)	Lendorf
19:00		Report	Bammer 14', 83', 89'; Bukva 47'; Zirnitzer 59'	Stadium: Thomas Morgenstern Arena; Attendance: 1,000; Referee: Andreas Heiss

22 September 2015	FC Piberstein Lankowitz (5)	1–0	Floridsdorfer AC (2)	Lankowitz
19:00	Steiner 2' (o.g.)	Report		Stadium: Sportplatz; Attendance: 800; Referee: Dieter Muckenhammer

22 September 2015	FC Stadlau (3)	2–1 (a.e.t.)	SK Austria Klagenfurt (2)	Vienna
16:00	Atan 83', 116'	Report	Bešlić 9'	Stadium: Sportplatz Stadlau; Attendance: 500; Referee: Aldin Hasanovic

22 September 2015	Kremser SC (4)	3–5 (a.e.t.)	FC Wacker Innsbruck (2)	Krems
19:00	Denk 3'; Schragner 85' (pen.); Hackl 109'	Report	Freitag 51'; Bayer 76' (o.g.); Gründler 96'; Hirschhofer 101'; Rosenbichler 118'	Stadium: Sepp Doll-Stadion; Attendance: 2,000; Referee: Manuel Schüttengruber

22 September 2015	SV Horn (3)	2–3 (a.e.t.)	FC Red Bull Salzburg (1)	Horn
19:30	Sakaki 8'; Rakowitz 86'	Report	Minamino 19'; Prevljak 41'; Soriano 92'	Stadium: Waldviertel-Volksbank Arena; Attendance: 3,520; Referee: Andreas Kollegger

22 September 2015	SV Seekirchen (3)	0–7	SK Sturm Graz (1)	Seekirchen
19:00		Report	Avdijaj 15', 38'; Potzmann 30'; Edomwonyi 31'; Schick 41'; Tadić 57'; Gruber 84'	Stadium: Sportzentrum Aug; Attendance: 1,200; Referee: Julian Weinberger

22 September 2015	TSV St. Johann (3)	1–1 (a.e.t.) (4–5 p)	LASK (2)	St. Johann im Pongau
19:00	Pertl 85'	Report	Luckeneder 24'	Stadium: Sportplatz; Attendance: 700; Referee: Helmut Trattnig
	Penalties
	Pertl (penalty scored); Eder (penalty missed); Grüll (penalty scored); Krimbacher (penalty scored); Sreco (penalty scored); Sahin (penalty missed); Gruber (penalty missed)		Gartler (penalty scored); Dovedan (penalty scored); Erbek (penalty scored); Ramsebner (penalty missed); Drazan (penalty scored); Fröschl (penalty missed); Ullmann (penalty scored)

22 September 2015	Union Gurten (3)	1–3	SV Mattersburg (1)	Gurten
16:00	Kreuzer 29'	Report	Malić 24'; Onisiwo 64'; Pink 88' (pen.)	Stadium: Park21-Arena; Attendance: 770; Referee: Christopher Jäger

22 September 2015	WSG Wattens (3)	0–0 (a.e.t.) (6–5 p)	Kapfenberger SV (2)	Wattens
16:00		Report		Stadium: Gernot Langes Stadion; Attendance: 1,490; Referee: Dominik Ouschan
	Penalties
	Schreter (penalty scored); Núñez (penalty scored); Gebauer (penalty scored); Buchacher (penalty missed); Shazad (penalty scored); Cihak (penalty scored)		Lasnik (penalty scored); Meusburger (penalty scored); Gollner (penalty scored); Arimany (penalty missed); Perchtold (penalty scored); Frieser (penalty scored); Imbongo (penalty missed)

22 September 2015	Wiener Sport-Club (3)	0–3	SC Rheindorf Altach (1)	Vienna
20:30		Report	Zwischenbrugger 9'; Salomon 67'; Seeger 90+3' (pen.)	Stadium: Sportclubplatz; Attendance: 1,368; Referee: Christian-Petru Ciochirca

23 September 2015	FC Wels (4)	0–7	FK Austria Wien (1)	Wels
19:00		Report	Rotpuller 1'; Serbest 15'; Hsani 18' (o.g.); Gorgon 23'; Friesenbichler 28'; Meilinger 56'; Vukojević 85'	Stadium: ASKÖ-Stadion; Attendance: 2,000; Referee: Sebastian Gishamer

23 September 2015	SKU Amstetten (3)	1–1 (a.e.t.) (3–4 p)	SK Rapid Wien (1)	Amstetten
18:00	Vuković 18' (pen.)	Report	Kainz 6'	Stadium: Ertl Glas-Stadion; Attendance: 3,300; Referee: Alexander Harkam
	Penalties
	Fahrngruber (penalty scored); Plank (penalty scored); Holzer (penalty missed); Peham (penalty scored); Lachmayr (penalty missed)		Alar (penalty scored); Hofmann (penalty scored); Domoraud (penalty missed); Schwab (penalty scored); Dibon (penalty scored)

23 September 2015	SV Ried (1)	0–0 (a.e.t.) (5–3 p)	Wolfsberger AC (1)	Ried im Innkreis
20:300		Report		Stadium: Keine Sorgen - Arena; Attendance: 2,000; Referee: Robert Schörgenhofer
	Penalties
	Trauner (penalty scored); Ziegl (penalty scored); Filipović (penalty scored); Möschl (penalty scored); Kragl (penalty scored)		Jacobo (penalty scored); Baldauf (penalty missed); Hellquist (penalty scored); Wernitznig (penalty scored)

23 September 2015	SV Wallern (3)	2–2 (a.e.t.) (2–4 p)	FC Admira Wacker Mödling (1)	Wallern
20:30	Sulimani 60'; Pecirep 104' (pen.)	Report	Bajrami 46'; Starkl 102'	Stadium: Sportplatz; Attendance: 500; Referee: Harald Lechner
	Penalties
	Reinhart (penalty scored); Karlinger (penalty scored); Fazeny (penalty missed); Pecirep (penalty missed)		Zwierschitz (penalty missed); Schicker (penalty scored); Starkl (penalty scored); Lackner (penalty scored); Bajrami (penalty scored)

== Third round ==
The matches took place between 27 October and 4 November 2015. The draw was made on 27 September 2015.

27 October 2015	ASK Ebreichsdorf (3)	2–3	SK Sturm Graz (1)	Ebreichsdorf
18:30	Monschein 72'; Vukajlović 89'	Report	Schick 13'; Tadić 86', 90'	Stadium: Sportzentrum; Attendance: 2,500; Referee: Dieter Muckenhammer

27 October 2015	FC Piberstein Lankowitz (5)	0–1	FC Admira Wacker Mödling (1)	Lankowitz
19:00		Report	Zwierschitz 16'	Stadium: Kunstrasenplatz; Attendance: 1,750; Referee: Julian Weinberger

27 October 2015	FC Red Bull Salzburg (1)	4–2	SV Ried (1)	Salzburg
19:00	Soriano 31', 72'; Berisha 88'; Keita 90'	Report	Kragl 5'; Gavilán 11'	Stadium: Red Bull Arena; Attendance: 3,911; Referee: Alexander Harkam

27 October 2015	FC Stadlau (3)	0–4	SKN St. Pölten (2)	Vienna
18:30		Report	Hartl 5', 15'; Ambichl 63'; Segovia 86'	Stadium: Sportclub-Platz; Attendance: 300; Referee: Helmut Trattnig

27 October 2015	FC Wacker Innsbruck (2)	0–2	LASK (2)	Innsbruck
20:30		Report	Dovedan 21'; Gartler 38'	Stadium: Tivoli; Attendance: 2,245; Referee: Robert Schörgenhofer

28 October 2015	SK Rapid Wien (1)	5–1	SV Austria Salzburg (2)	Vienna
20:30	Schobesberger 8', 10'; Prosenik 69'; Tomi 81'; Alar 87'	Report	Kaufmann 75'	Stadium: Ernst-Happel-Stadion; Attendance: 9,400; Referee: Andreas Kollegger

28 October 2015	WSG Wattens (3)	0–2	SV Mattersburg (1)	Wattens
18:30		Report	Grgic 10'; Röcher 84'	Stadium: Gernot Langes-Stadion; Attendance: 1,300; Referee: Christopher Jäger

4 November 2015	FK Austria Wien (1)	2–1	SC Rheindorf Altach (1)	Vienna
18:00	Friesenbichler 22', 82'	Report	Hofbauer 108'	Stadium: Generali Arena; Attendance: 4,805; Referee: Alexander Harkam

== Quarter-finals ==
The matches took place on 9 and 10 February 2016. The draw was made on November 8, 2015.

9 February 2016	FK Austria Wien (1)	1–0	LASK (2)	Vienna
19:00	Friesenbichler 21'	Report		Stadium: Generali Arena; Attendance: 5,204; Referee: Markus Hameter

9 February 2016	SV Mattersburg (1)	1–2	SKN St. Pölten (2)	Mattersburg
18:30	Röcher 88'	Report	Dober 8'; Wisio 57'	Stadium: Pappelstadion; Attendance: 2,300; Referee: Alexander Harkam

10 February 2016	SK Rapid Wien (1)	0–1	FC Admira Wacker Mödling (1)	Vienna
18:00		Report	Grozurek 87'	Stadium: Ernst-Happel-Stadion; Attendance: 6,200; Referee: Christopher Jäger

10 February 2016	SK Sturm Graz (1)	0–1	FC Red Bull Salzburg (1)	Graz
20:30		Report	Lainer 29'	Stadium: UPC-Arena; Attendance: 6,248; Referee: Harald Lechner

== Semi-finals ==
The matches took place on 19 and 20 April 2016. The draw was made on 14 February 2016.

19 April 2016	FC Admira Wacker Mödling (1)	2–1	SKN St. Pölten (2)	Maria Enzersdorf
18:00	Grozurek 52'; Starkl 59'	Report	Hartl 50'	Stadium: BSFZ-Arena; Attendance: 3,720; Referee: Markus Hameter

20 April 2016	FC Red Bull Salzburg (1)	5–2	FK Austria Wien (1)	Salzburg
20:30	Soriano 57'; Ulmer 60'; Larsen 72' (o.g.); Laimer 81', 87'	Report	Venuto 12'; Grünwald 82'	Stadium: Red Bull Arena; Attendance: 6,173; Referee: Manuel Schüttengruber

== Final ==
The final was played on 19 May 2016 at the Wörthersee Stadion in Klagenfurt.

=== Details ===
19 May 2016
19:30

Admira Wacker Mödling	0–5	Red Bull Salzburg
		Soriano 7', 65', 86'; Keïta 28'; Laimer 73'

Wörthersee Stadion, Klagenfurt
Attendance: 10,200
Referee: Robert Schörgenhofer

Admira Wacker Mödling	Red Bull Salzburg

GK	28	(Austria) Jörg Siebenhandl
RB	4	(Austria) Stephan Zwierschitz
CB	6	(Austria) Markus Lackner
CB	21	(Austria) Markus Wostry
LB	25	(Austria) Patrick Wessely
CM	10	(Austria) Daniel Toth	(yellow card) 61'
CM	8	(Austria) Christoph Knasmüllner		(substituted off) 74'
RW	17	(Austria) Dominik Starkl	(yellow card) 72'
AM	11	(Austria) Lukas Grozurek		(substituted off) 87'
LW	93	(Austria) Srđan Spiridonović		(substituted off) 67'
CF	14	(Austria) Christoph Monschein
Substitutes:
GK	29	(Austria) Manuel Kuttin
DF	15	(Austria) Manuel Maranda		(substituted on) 87'
DF	20	(Austria) Markus Pavić
MF	27	(Austria) Eldis Bajrami		(substituted on) 74'
MF	44	(Austria) Markus Blutsch
MF	12	(Austria) Philipp Malicsek		(substituted on) 67'
FW	7	(Austria) Maximilian Sax
Manager:
(Austria) Ernst Baumeister

GK	33	(Germany) Alexander Walke
RB	22	(Austria) Stefan Lainer
CB	3	(Brazil) Paulo Miranda
CB	5	(Croatia) Duje Ćaleta-Car
LB	5	(Austria) Andreas Ulmer	(substituted off) 16'
CM	95	(Brazil) Bernardo
CM	8	(Guinea) Naby Keïta	(substituted off) 69'
CM	27	(Austria) Konrad Laimer
RW	10	(Austria) Valentino Lazaro
LW	14	(Kosovo) Valon Berisha
CF	39	(Spain) Jonathan Soriano	(substituted off) 87'
Substitutes:
GK	1	(Austria) Cican Stankovic
DF	2	(Austria) Benno Schmitz	(substituted on) 16'
DF	4	(France) Dayot Upamecano
MF	47	(Austria) Xaver Schlager
MF	18	(Japan) Takumi Minamino	(substituted on) 69'
MF	37	(Cameroon) Dimitri Oberlin
CF	35	(Peru) Yordy Reyna	(substituted on) 87'
Manager:
(Spain) Óscar García
