= 2015–16 Austrian Football First League =

Austrian Football First League
- Season: 2015–16
- Champions: SKN St. Pölten
- Promoted: SKN St. Pölten
- Relegated: SK Austria Klagenfurt; SV Austria Salzburg
- Matches: 180
- Goals: 528 (2.93 per match)
- Top goalscorer: Thomas Pichlmann (20)
- Biggest home win: SKN St. Pölten 6-2 SV Austria Salzburg (27 November 2015); FC Liefering 5-1 SV Kapfenberg (2 October 2015); SK Austria Klagenfurt 5-1 SV Kapfenberg (28 August 2015); FC Liefering 4-0 SV Austria Salzburg (11 March 2016); LASK Linz 4-0 Floridsdorfer AC (27 November 2015); FC Liefering 4-0 LASK Linz (20 November 2015); SK Austria Klagenfurt 4-0 FC Liefering (24 July 2015)
- Biggest away win: SK Austria Klagenfurt 0-5 LASK Linz (29 April 2016)
- Highest scoring: SKN St. Pölten 6-2 SV Austria Salzburg (27 November 2015)

The 2015–16 Austrian Football First League (German: Erste Liga, also known as Sky Go Erste Liga due to sponsorship) was the 42nd season of the Austrian second-level football league. It began on 24 July 2015 and ended on 25 May 2016.

== Teams ==
Ten teams participate in the 2015-16 season. Austria Salzburg was directly promoted after winning the 2014–15 Regionalliga West. Austria Klagenfurt promoted from the Regionalliga Mitte after winning the promotion play-offs. Wiener Neustadt relegated from the 2014–15 Bundesliga.

Location of teams in the 2015–16 Austrian Football First League

Club Name	City	Stadium	Capacity
Austria Klagenfurt	Klagenfurt	Wörthersee Stadion	32,000
Austria Lustenau	Lustenau	Reichshofstadion	8,800
Austria Salzburg	Salzburg	My Phone Austria Stadion	1,600
Floridsdorfer AC	Vienna	FAC-Platz	3,000
Kapfenberger SV	Kapfenberg	Franz-Fekete-Stadion	12,000
LASK	Linz	Linzer Stadion	14,100
Liefering	Salzburg	Red Bull Arena	31,895
St. Pölten	Sankt Pölten	NV Arena	8,000
Wacker Innsbruck	Innsbruck	Tivoli-Neu	30,000
Wiener Neustadt	Wiener Neustadt	Stadion Wiener Neustadt	10,000

=== Personnel and kits ===
Club	Manager	Captain	Kit Manufacturer	Sponsors
A. Klagenfurt	(Germany) Manfred Bender	(Austria)	Erreà	Hanseatisches Fußball Kontor
A. Lustenau	(Austria) Lassaad Chabbi	(Austria)	Nike	
A. Salzburg	(Norway) Jørn Andersen	(Austria)	Puma	Intertops
Floridsdorfer	(Austria) Thomas Flögel	(Austria)	Puma	Wien Energie
Kapfenberger	(Austria) Kurt Russ	(Austria)	Erima	Murauer Bier
Linz	(Austria) Oliver Glasner	(Austria)	Jako	PlusCity
Liefering	(Austria) Thomas Letsch	(Austria)	Nike	Red Bull
St. Polten	(Austria) Karl Daxbacher	(Austria)	Jako	Hypo Noe
Wacker Innsbruck	(Austria) Klaus Schmidt	(Austria)	Jako	Tiroler Wasserkraft
Wiener Neustadt	(Austria) Günter Kreissl	(Austria)	Puma	Baumit

== League table ==
Pos	Team	Pld	W	D	L	GF	GA	GD	Pts	Promotion or relegation
1	SKN St. Pölten (C, P)	36	26	2	8	68	34	+34	80	Promotion to 2016–17 Austrian Bundesliga
2	LASK Linz	36	22	6	8	65	35	+30	72	
3	FC Wacker Innsbruck	36	17	8	11	61	47	+14	59	
4	FC Liefering (Note: Reserve teams are ineligible for promotion.)	36	17	6	13	65	49	+16	57	
5	SC Austria Lustenau	36	16	9	11	56	40	+16	57	
6	Kapfenberger SV	36	14	8	14	63	62	+1	50	
7	SC Wiener Neustadt	36	12	9	15	39	49	−10	45	
8	SK Austria Klagenfurt (Note: SK Austria Klagenfurt were denied a First Liga license at the last minute and promptly demoted.) (R)	36	8	10	18	43	62	−19	34	Relegation to 2016–17 Austrian Regionalliga
9	SV Austria Salzburg (Note: SV Austria Salzburg were deducted six points for license violation and later declared insolvency.) (R)	36	7	11	18	45	73	−28	26	Relegation to 2016–17 Austrian Regionalliga
10	Floridsdorfer AC (Note: Reprieved from relegation.)	36	4	5	27	23	77	−54	17	

Source: Austrian Football First League
Rules for classification: 1) Points; 2) Less matches awarded against; 3) Goal difference; 4) Goals scored; 5) Matches won; 6) Away matches won; 7) Head-to-head points; 8) Head-to-head goal difference; 9) Head-to-head goals scored.
(C) Champions; (P) Promoted; (R) Relegated

== Results ==
Teams played each other four times in the league. In the first half of the season each team played every other team twice (home and away), and then did the same in the second half of the season.

=== First half of season ===
Home \ Away	AKL	ALU	SVA	FLO	KAP	LIN	LIE	STP	WKR	WN
Austria Klagenfurt		1–1	1–1	1–0	5–1	2–2	4–0	1–2	1–2	1–0
Austria Lustenau	3–0		0–2	1–0	1–2	2–1	1–2	0–1	2–1	2–0
Austria Salzburg	1–1	1–3		2–1	0–2	0–2	2–2	1–5	3–4	3–0
Floridsdorfer AC	1–3	1–3	2–2		0–3	0–2	1–5	0–1	1–5	1–2
Kapfenberger SV	1–1	1–0	2–3	0–1		1–5	5–2	1–3	1–4	0–1
LASK Linz	2–0	2–1	2–0	2–1	4–2		1–2	1–0	0–1	0–0
Liefering	4–1	2–1	5–3	4–1	5–1	4–0		2–1	0–1	0–1
St. Pölten	1–1	0–1	2–2	2–0	1–2	1–0	1–0		0–3	2–0
Wacker Innsbruck	4–2	1–0	1–1	1–1	0–0	1–2	4–1	1–3		3–3
Wiener Neustadt	1–1	1–3	2–0	1–0	0–2	0–0	1–0	2–3	1–2	

Updated to match(es) played on 27 November 2015. Source: Austrian Football First League (in German)
Legend: Blue = home team win; Yellow = draw; Red = away team win.

=== Second half of season ===
Home \ Away	AKL	ALU	SVA	FLO	KAP	LIN	LIE	STP	WKR	WN
Austria Klagenfurt		0–2	0–2	1–2	1–4	0–5	0–0	0–2	5–2	0–2
Austria Lustenau	2–0		4–1	1–1	2–2	0–2	1–1	4–2	3–0	1–1
Austria Salzburg	1–2	1–1		0–1	0–4	1–3	0–0	0–1	1–0	2–2
Floridsdorfer AC	0–2	1–1	2–1		0–1	2–2	0–3	0–3	0–1	0–1
Kapfenberger SV	2–2	2–4	1–1	4–1		1–2	2–1	0–1	2–2	4–2
LASK Linz	2–1	0–2	2–1	4–0	1–1		1–0	2–0	1–0	2–1
Liefering	3–1	2–2	4–0	3–1	1–0	1–4		1–2	0–1	1–1
St. Pölten	1–0	3–0	6–2	3–0	2–1	3–2	1–2		1–0	3–2
Wacker Innsbruck	3–1	1–0	2–2	3–0	2–2	1–1	1–2	0–2		1–2
Wiener Neustadt	0–0	1–1	1–2	1–0	1–3	2–1	1–0	0–3	0–2	

Updated to match(es) played on 25 May 2016. Source: Austrian Football First League (in German)
Legend: Blue = home team win; Yellow = draw; Red = away team win.

== Season statistics ==
=== Top goalscorers ===
As of 25 May 2016.

Rank	Scorer	Club	Goals
1	(Austria) Thomas Pichlmann	FC Wacker Innsbruck	20
2	(Spain) Daniel Lucas Segovia	SKN St. Pölten	19
3	(Germany) Julian Wießmeier	SC Austria Lustenau	15
4	(Slovenia) Patrik Eler	SK Austria Klagenfurt	14
4	(Austria) René Gartler	LASK Linz	14
6	(Austria) Seifedin Chabbi	SC Austria Lustenau	13
7	(Brazil) Fabiano de Lima Campos Maria	LASK Linz	11
7	(Austria) Manuel Hartl	SKN St. Pölten	11
9	(Brazil) Jorge Elias dos Santos	Kapfenberger SV	10
9	(Austria) Marco Perchtold	Kapfenberger SV	10
11	(Slovenia) Rajko Rep	SK Austria Klagenfurt	9
11	(Brazil) João Victor Santos Sá	Kapfenberger SV	9

=== Top assists ===
As of 25 May 2016.

Rank	Scorer	Club	Assists
1	(Austria) Ernst Öbster	SV Austria Salzburg	11
2	(Austria) Michael Ambichl	SKN St. Pölten	10
3	(Austria) Dominik Frieser	Kapfenberger SV	9
3	(Austria) Manuel Kerhe	LASK Linz	9
4	(Austria) Florian Flecker	Kapfenberger SV	8
4	(Austria) Manuel Hartl	SKN St. Pölten	8
4	(France) Dimitry Imbongo	LASK Linz	8
8	(Austria) Florian Jamnick	FC Wacker Innsbruck	7
8	(Austria) Sandro Zakany	SK Austria Klagenfurt	7
10	(Austria) Rene Gartler	LASK Linz	6

== See also ==
- 2015–16 Austrian Football Bundesliga
- 2015–16 Austrian Cup
