= Zangerl =

Zangerl is a surname. Notable people with the surname include:

- Barbara Zangerl (born 1988), Austrian rock climber
- Rainer Zangerl (1912–2004), American paleontologist, born in Switzerland
- Simon Zangerl (born 1990), Austrian footballer
- Thomas Zangerl (born 1983), Austrian freestyle skier
