= Koelbl =

Koelbl or Kölbl is a German surname. Notable people with the surname include:

Koelbl

- Herlinde Koelbl (born 1939), German photographic artist, author and documentary filmer
- Susanne Koelbl (born 1965), German journalist, lecturer and foreign correspondent, daughter of Herlinde

Kölbl

- Daniel Kölbl (born 1993), German politician
- Michael Kölbl (born 1986), Austrian footballer

== See also ==
- Bobby Koelble (born 1968), American guitarist
- Ralf Kölbel (born 1968), German social scientist and academic
- Špela Kolbl (born 1998), Slovenian footballer
