= Marcel Holzmann =

Austrian footballer

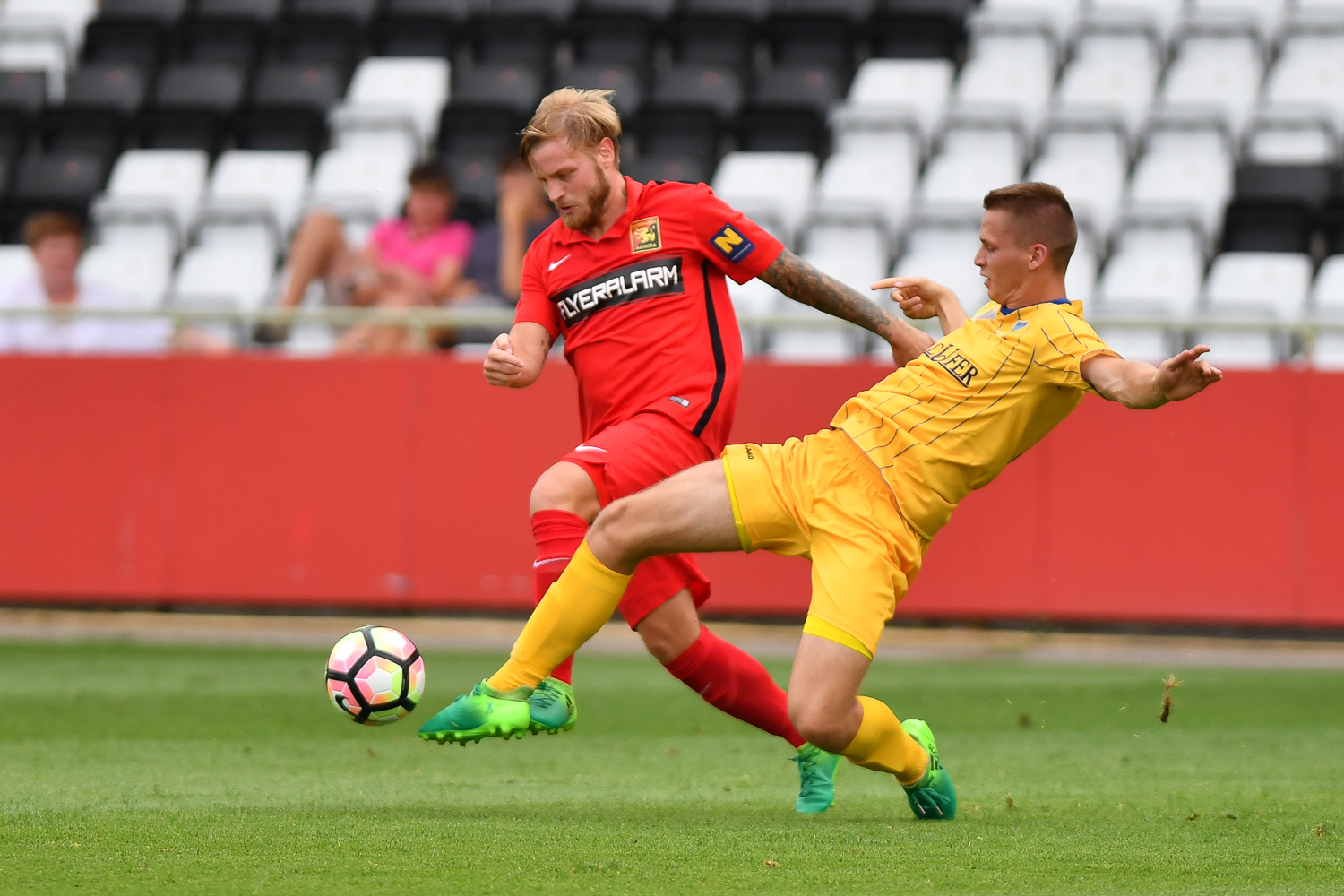

Personal information
- Date of birth: 3 September 1990 (age 36)
- Place of birth: Salzburg, Austria
- Height: 1.74 m (5 ft 9 in)
- Position: Defender

Team information
- Current team: Phönix Lübeck
- Number: 24

Youth career
- 1997–2004: SV Bürmoos
- 2005–2008: Red Bull Salzburg

Senior career*
Years	Team	Apps	(Gls)
2008–2011	RB Salzburg Juniors	44	(2)
2010	→ Bayern Munich II (loan)	9	(1)
2011	→ FC Lustenau (loan)	15	(0)
2011–2012	FC Lustenau	31	(2)
2012–2017	St. Pölten	107	(6)
2017–2018	Admira Wacker	13	(0)
2019–2021	Botoșani	35	(1)
2021–2022	Academica Clinceni	23	(2)
2022–	Phönix Lübeck	2	(1)

International career
2010–2011	Austria U21	2	(0)
- * Club domestic league appearances and goals as of 3 October 2022

Marcel Holzmann (born 3 September 1990) is an Austrian professional footballer who plays as a defender for German club Phönix Lübeck. In his career, Holzmann also played for teams such as Red Bull Salzburg Juniors, FC Lustenau, St. Pölten or FC Botoșani, among others.

== Honours ==
SKN St. Pölten

- Erste Liga: 2015–16
