= Jakob Kreuzer =

Austrian footballer (born 1995)

Personal information
- Full name: Jakob Kreuzer
- Date of birth: 15 January 1995 (age 31)
- Place of birth: Austria
- Height: 1.83 m (6 ft 0 in)
- Position: Forward

Team information
- Current team: Union Gurten
- Number: 10

Senior career*
Years	Team	Apps	(Gls)
2012–2016	SV Ried II	47	(17)
2013–2016	SV Ried	31	(1)
2013–2016	→ Union Gurten (loan)	17	(6)
2016–2018	Blau-Weiß Linz	37	(5)
2018–	Union Gurten	166	(44)
- * Club domestic league appearances and goals as of 27 June 2026

Jakob Kreuzer (born 15 January 1995) is an Austrian footballer who plays for Union Gurten.
