= Matthias Aigner =

Austrian association football player (born 1993)

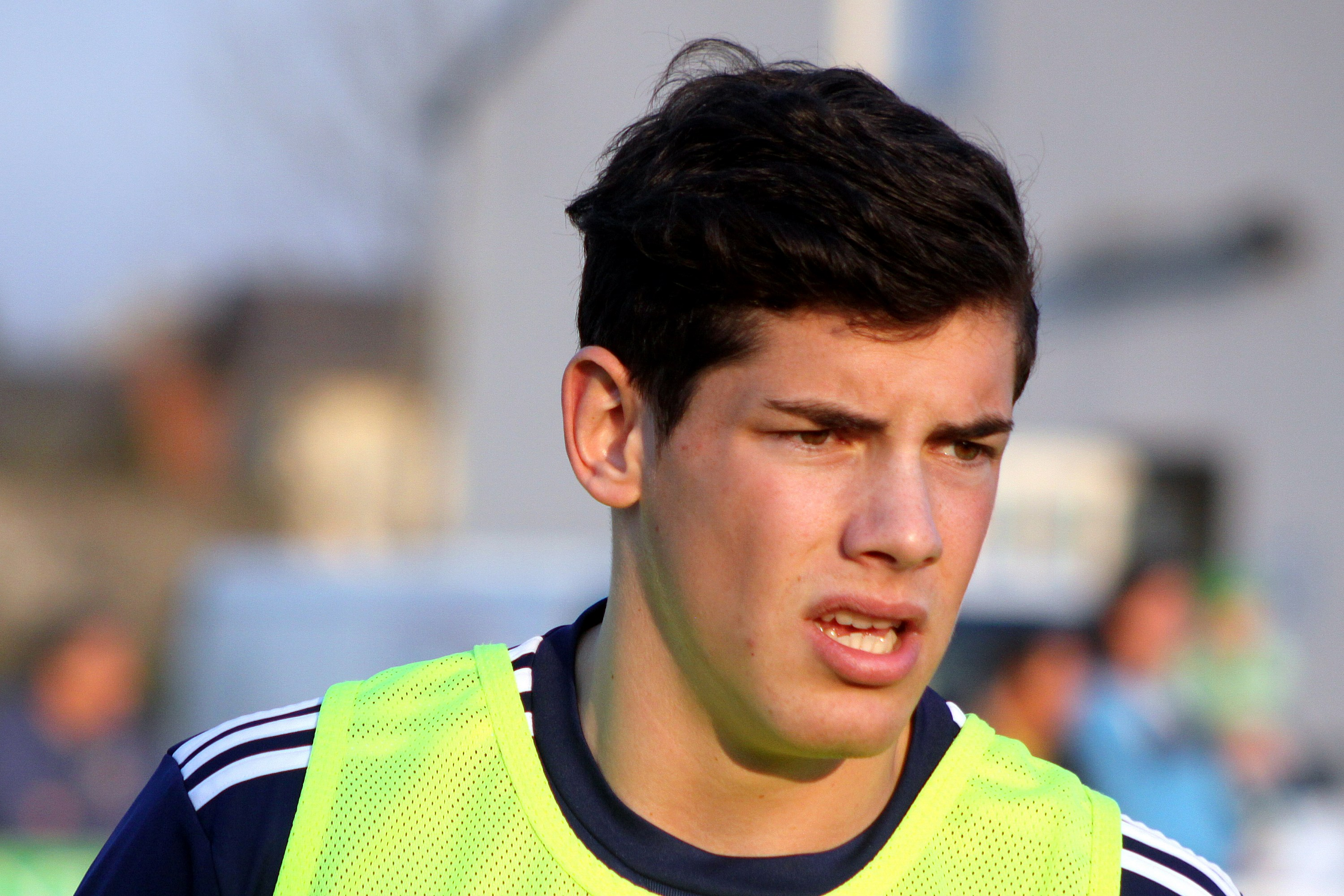
- Wurm in 2014

Personal information
- Birth name: Matthias Wurm
- Date of birth: 3 April 1993 (age 33)
- Place of birth: Austria
- Height: 1.79 m (5 ft 10 in)
- Position: Midfielder

Team information
- Current team: ASK Ybbs

Youth career
- 1999–2007: SKU Amstetten
- 2007–2011: AKA St. Pölten

Senior career*
| Years | Team | Apps | (Gls) |
| 2011–2021 | SKU Amstetten | 207 | (13) |
| 2021– | ASK Ybbs | 0 | (0) |
- * Club domestic league appearances and goals as of 23 May 2021

Matthias Aigner (formerly Matthias Wurm, born 3 April 1993) is an Austrian professional footballer who plays as a midfielder for Austrian 2. Landesliga club ASK Ybbs.

== Club career ==
=== Early career ===
Wurm began his career in 1999 with the youth academy of Amstetten. He made his professional debut playing for Amstetten against Austria Wien II on 9 August 2011.

On 1 June 2021, he moved to the fifth-tier club ASK Ybbs.

== Personal life ==
Matthias and Sandra Aigner have a son named Valentin (born 2018).
