= Christoph Friedl =

Austrian footballer

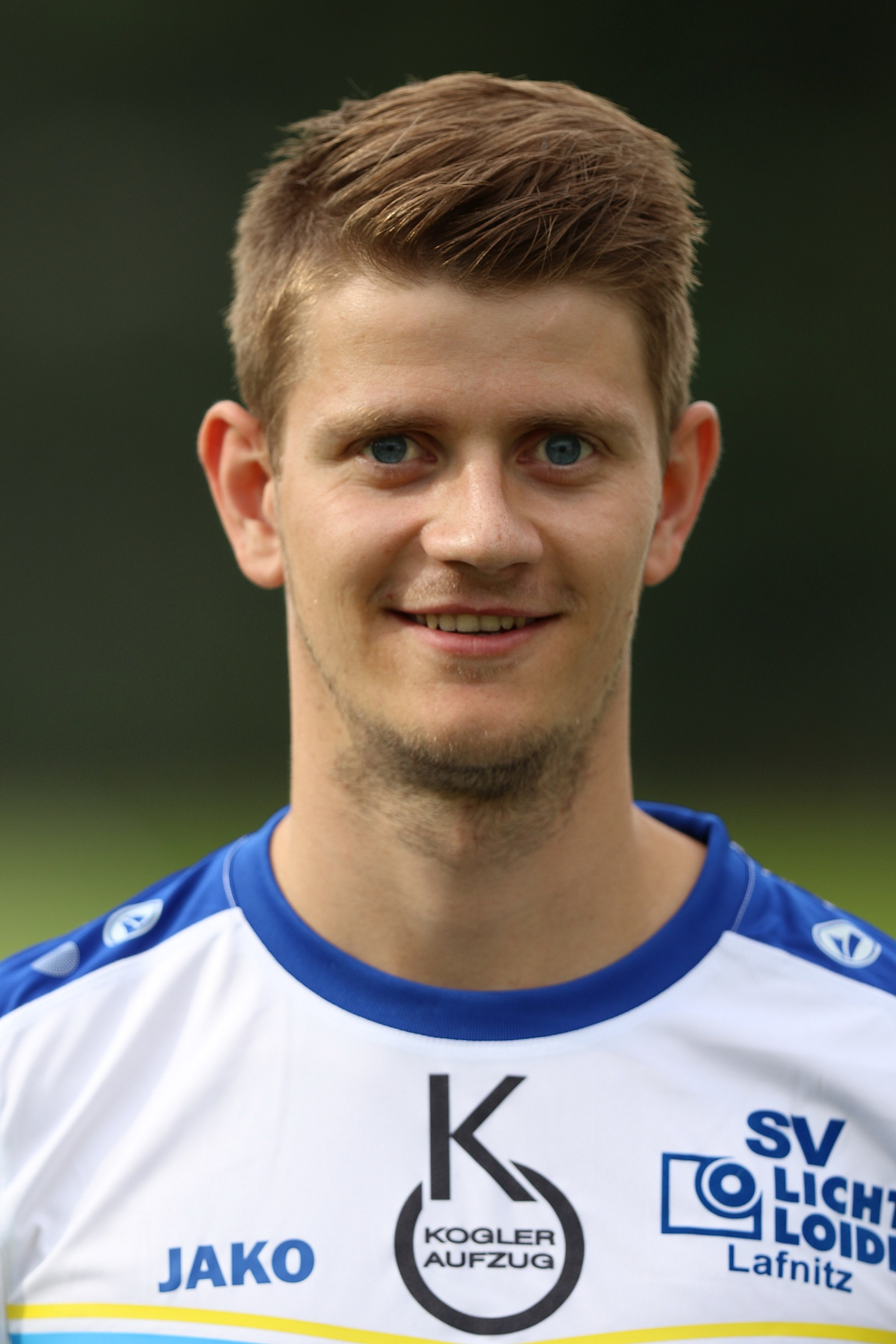

Personal information
- Date of birth: 14 July 1992
- Place of birth: Austria
- Height: 1.73 m (5 ft 8 in)
- Position: Midfielder

Youth career
- 1998–2005: USV Söchau
- 2005–2008: Grazer AK

Senior career*
Years	Team	Apps	(Gls)
2008–2011	TSV Hartberg II		
2011–2012	TSV Hartberg	17	(1)
2012–	SV Lafnitz	155	(38)
- * Club domestic league appearances and goals

Christoph Friedl (born 14 July 1992 in Austria) is an Austrian football player currently playing for SV Lafnitz. He has previously played for TSV Hartberg.

== Honours ==
=== Club ===
SV Lafnitz

- Austrian Regionalliga Central (1) 2017-18
