= Daniel Kalla =

Canadian author and physician

Daniel Kalla is a Canadian author and physician. He has written several popular novels in the thriller and historical fiction genres, all with medical themes. He was the director of Emergency Medicine at St. Paul's Hospital in Vancouver, British Columbia.

Both Kalla's father and grandfather were also practicing physicians; his grandfather fled Czechoslovakia weeks prior to the Nazi annexation of that country in 1939. Kalla was born in Vancouver on May 4, 1966. He attended the University of British Columbia, where he studied math as an undergraduate, and received his M.D. He also took a screenwriting course at Simon Fraser University, which encouraged his writing ambitions. His first novel, Pandemic, was inspired by his experiences screening potential SARS patients in Vancouver during the 2003 outbreak. He went on to head the Emergency Medicine departments at two Vancouver hospitals. He is an Associate Clinical Professor at the University of British Columbia. As of 2025, he has published sixteen novels with three publishers, Tor, HarperCollins, and Simon & Schuster. He has used a recurring character, Dr. Franz Adler, in three of his novels.

== Bibliography ==
- Pandemic, Tor, 2005
- Resistance, Tor, 2006
- Rage Therapy, Tor, 2006
- Blood Lies, Forge (Tor) 2008
- Cold Plague, Forge (Tor), 2008
- Of Flesh and Blood, Forge (Tor), 2010
- The Far Side of the Sky, HarperCollins, 2011
- Rising Sun, Falling Shadow, HarperCollins, 2013
- Nightfall Over Shanghai, HarperCollins 2015
- We All Fall Down, Simon & Schuster, 2019
- The Last High, Simon & Schuster, 2020
- Lost Immunity, Simon & Schuster, 2021
- The Darkness in the Light, Simon & Schuster, 2022
- Fit to Die, Simon & Schuster, 2023
- High Society, Simon & Schuster, 2024
- The Deepest Fake, Simon & Schuster, 2025
