= Andreas Bauer (footballer) =

Austrian footballer

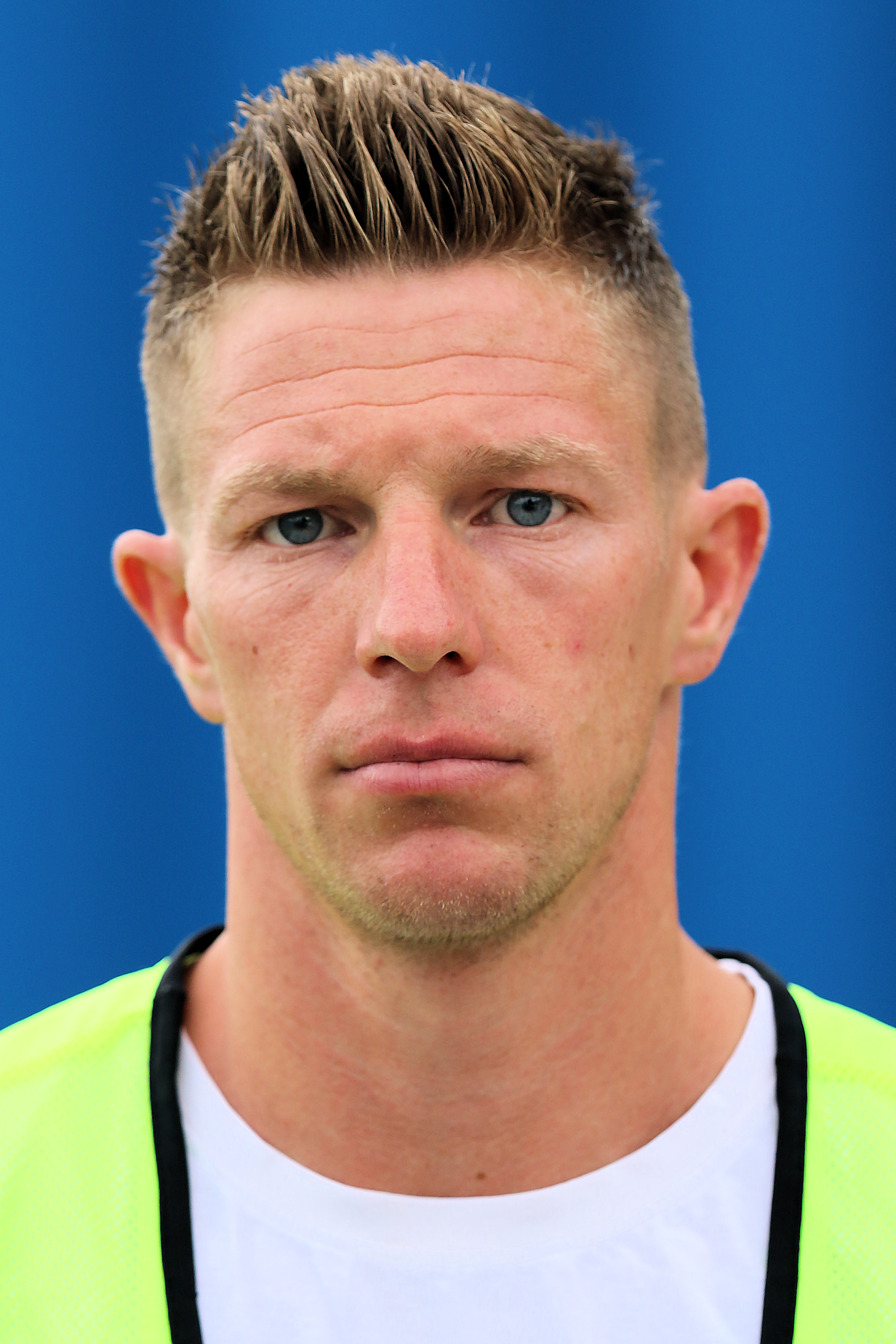

Personal information
- Date of birth: 15 September 1985 (age 41)
- Place of birth: Austria
- Height: 1.73 m (5 ft 8 in)
- Position: Left back

Team information
- Current team: Team Wiener Linien
- Number: 13

Youth career
- 1993–1995: FC Stadlau
- 1995–1996: SV Hirschstetten/Lindenhof
- 1996–2002: FC Stadlau

Senior career*
| Years | Team | Apps | (Gls) |
| 2002–2006 | FC Stadlau | 61 | (10) |
| 2006–2008 | SK Rapid Wien II | 48 | (1) |
| 2008–2009 | FC Lustenau 07 | 17 | (1) |
| 2009–2016 | Floridsdorfer AC | 215 | (5) |
| 2016–2019 | FC Stadlau | 69 | (7) |
| 2019– | Team Wiener Linien | 19 | (0) |
- * Club domestic league appearances and goals as of 22:51, 16 January 2021 (UTC)

Andreas Bauer (born 15 September 1985) is an Austrian footballer who currently plays as a defender for Team Wiener Linien.
