= Herbert Rauter =

Austrian footballer

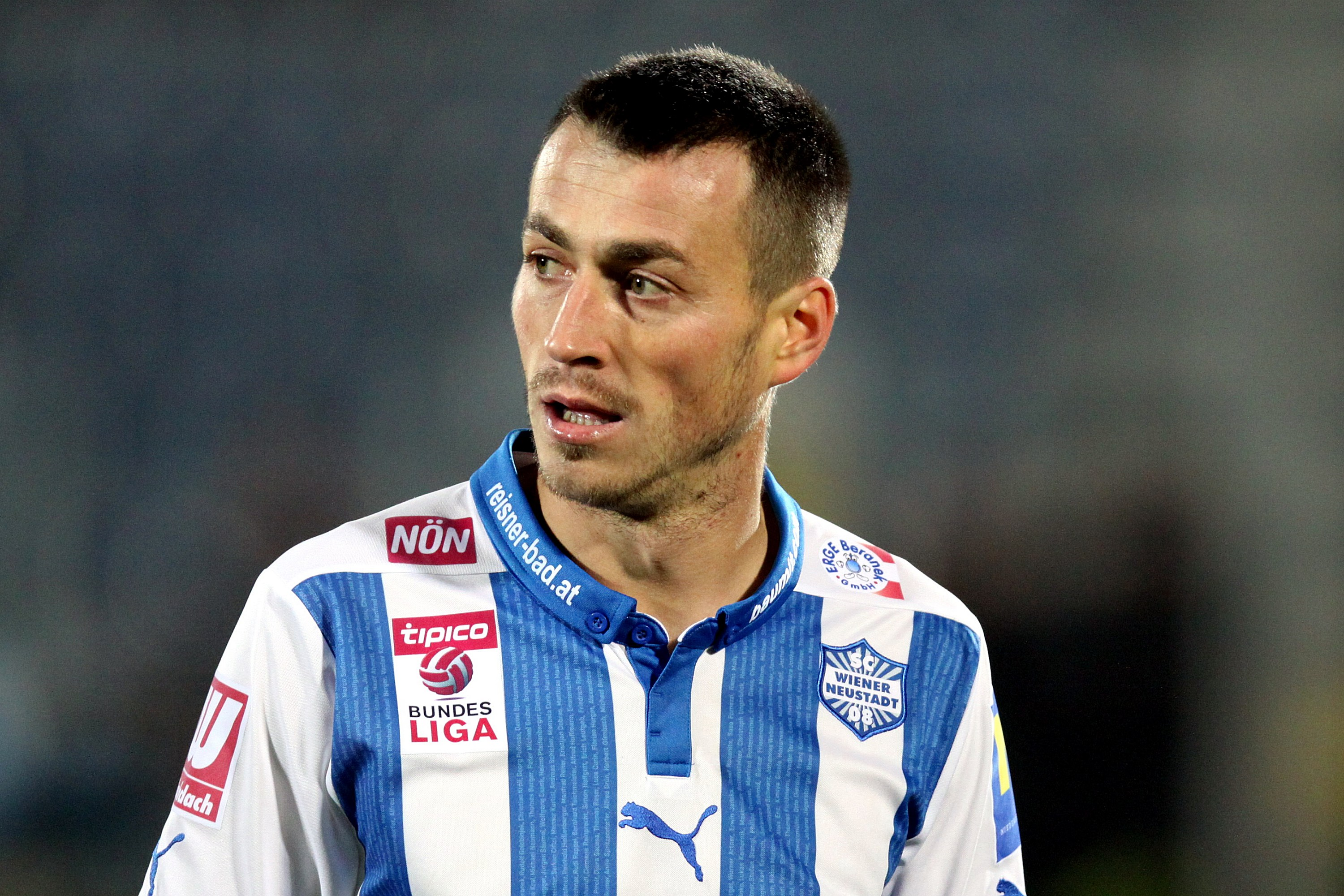
- Rauter in 2014

Personal information
- Full name: Herbert Rauter
- Date of birth: 27 January 1982 (age 44)
- Place of birth: Graz, Austria
- Height: 1.72 m (5 ft 8 in)
- Position: Forward

Senior career*
Years	Team	Apps	(Gls)
2001–2007	SK Sturm Graz	88	(6)
2007–2009	DSV Leoben	47	(7)
2009–2012	Grazer AK	115	(69)
2012–2015	SC Wiener Neustadt	81	(11)
2015–2017	SC Ritzing	37	(10)
Total		368	(103)
- * Club domestic league appearances and goals

Herbert Rauter (born 27 January 1982) is an Austrian former professional footballer who played as forward.
