= Andreas Lienhart =

Austrian footballer

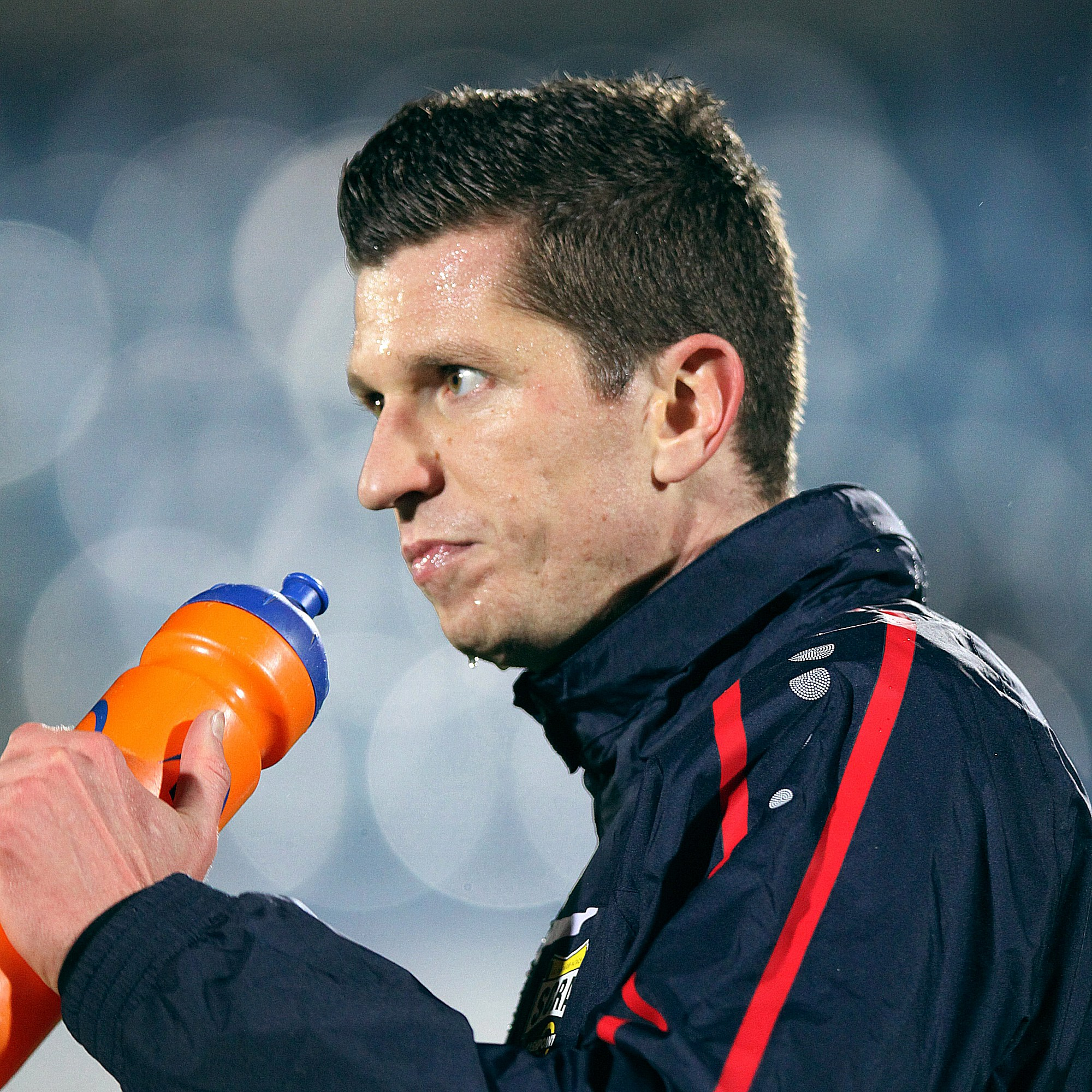
- Lienhart in 2014

Personal information
- Full name: Andreas Lienhart
- Date of birth: 21 August 1986 (age 40)
- Place of birth: Graz, Austria
- Height: 1.83 m (6 ft 0 in)
- Position: Right back

Team information
- Current team: Hartberg (assistant coach)

Senior career*
Years	Team	Apps	(Gls)
2005–2007	Grazer AK	19	(2)
2007–2010	Kapfenberger SV	63	(6)
2009–2010	→ Rheindorf Altach (loan)	28	(4)
2010–2019	Rheindorf Altach	290	(16)
2019–2021	Hartberg	46	(3)

Managerial career
- 2021–: Hartberg (assistant)
- * Club domestic league appearances and goals

Andreas Lienhart (born 21 August 1986) is an Austrian football coach and a former player who played as a right back. He is an assistant coach with Hartberg.

== Career ==
On 11 June 2019, it was confirmed that Lienhart had joined TSV Hartberg on a 2-year contract.
