= Leonardo Barnjak =

Croatian footballer

Personal information
- Full name: Leonardo Barnjak
- Date of birth: 31 January 1984 (age 42)
- Place of birth: Bugojno, SR Bosnia and Herzegovina, SFR Yugoslavia
- Height: 1.81 m (5 ft 11 1/2 in)
- Position: Striker

Youth career
- –2003: Dinamo Zagreb

Senior career*
Years	Team	Apps	(Gls)
2003–2004	Hrvatski Dragovoljac	26	(8)
2004–2005	Zadar	23	(10)
2006	Segesta	4	(2)
2006	Međimurje	2	(0)
2007	Zadar	10	(4)
2007–2008	Segesta	21	(8)
2008	Hrvatski Dragovoljac	6	(0)
2009–2011	Velebit Benkovac	60	(36)
2011–2017	TSV St. Johann	128	(63)
2018	Bischofshofen	18	(12)
2019	Oberndorfer	19	(10)
2020-2021	FC Hammerau (player/coach)		
- * Club domestic league appearances and goals as of 4 June 2022

Leonardo Barnjak (born 31 January 1984) is a Croatian retired football striker who played primarily for TSV St. Johann in the Austrian Regional League West.

== Managerial career ==
After finishing his career at German amateur side FC Hammerau, Barnjak returned to Austria to take the helm at Austria Salzburg Reserves.
