= Thomas Bergmann =

Austrian footballer (born 1989)

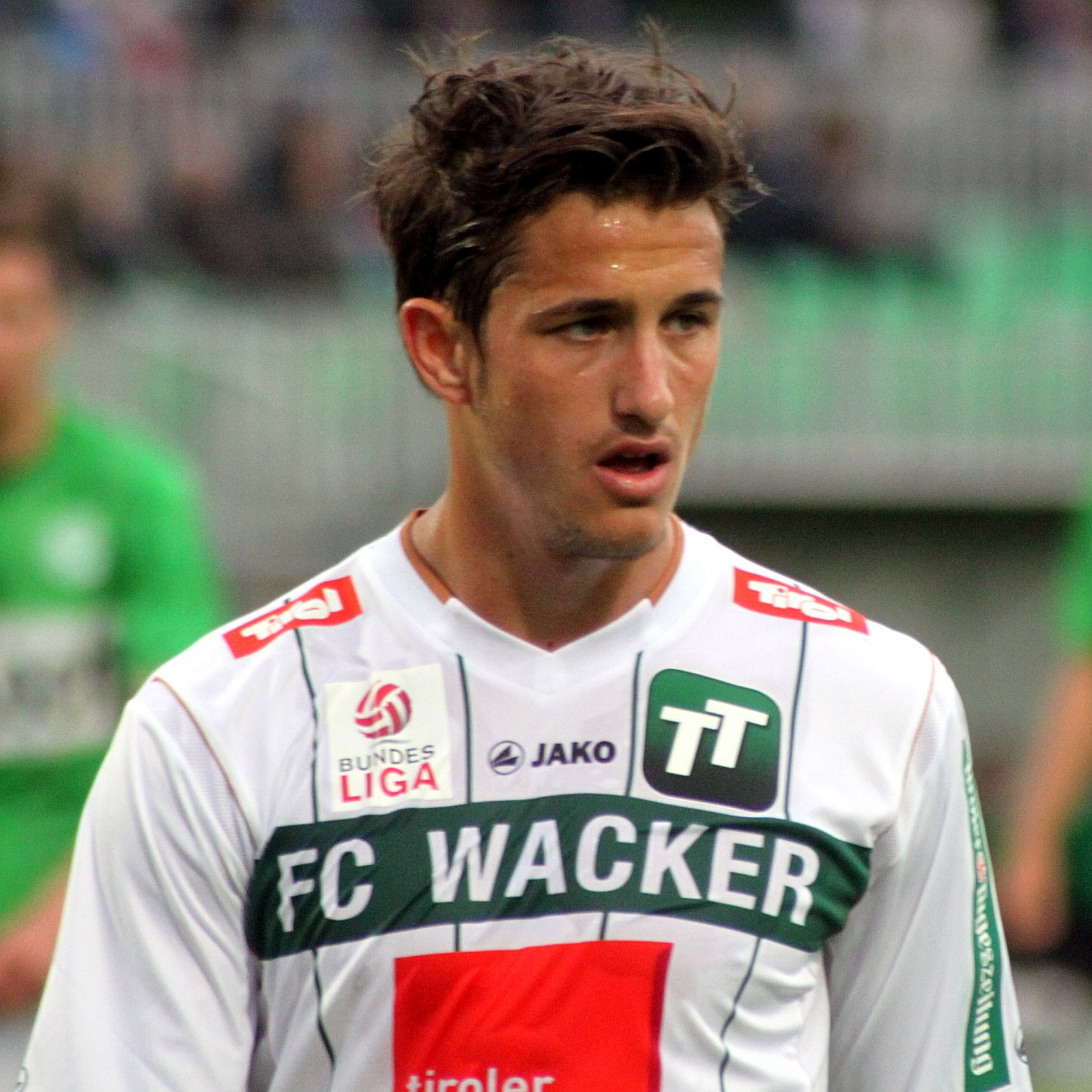

Personal information
- Full name: Thomas Bergmann
- Date of birth: 20 September 1989 (age 37)
- Place of birth: Vienna, Austria
- Height: 1.77 m (5 ft 10 in)
- Positions: Right back; right midfielder

Team information
- Current team: FC Zirl
- Number: 89

Youth career
- 1997–2001: FC Stadlau
- 2001–2004: Austria Wien
- 2001–2004: FC Stadlau

Senior career*
Years	Team	Apps	(Gls)
2007–2008	FC Stadlau	43	(15)
2008–2012	Rapid Wien	47	(2)
2011–2012	→ Wacker Innsbruck (loan)	29	(0)
2012–2015	Wacker Innsbruck	86	(2)
2015–2017	SV Ried	44	(1)
2018–	FC Zirl	72	(17)
- * Club domestic league appearances and goals as of 23:27, 16 January 2021 (UTC)

Thomas Bergmann (born 20 September 1989) is an Austrian footballer who currently plays for FC Zirl.
