= Fábio Silva (footballer, born 1985) =

Cape Verdean/Portuguese footballer

Personal information
- Full name: Fábio Emanuel Moreira Silva
- Date of birth: 5 April 1985 (age 41)
- Place of birth: Lisbon, Portugal
- Height: 1.82 m (6 ft 0 in)
- Position: Midfielder

Senior career*
Years	Team	Apps	(Gls)
2003–2005	Estrela da Amadora	7	(0)
2005–2006	Benfica B	12	(1)
2006–2007	Tenerife B	31	(4)
2007–2008	Drava Ptuj	0	(0)
2008–2009	Odivelas	25	(2)
2009–2010	Espinho	6	(1)
2010–2011	Metalurh Zaporizhzhia	13	(1)
2012	Kazincbarcikai	2	(0)
2013–2014	LASK Linz	13	(1)

International career
2011	Cape Verde	1	(0)
- * Club domestic league appearances and goals

Fábio Emanuel Moreira Silva (born 5 April 1985) is a Cape Verdean former professional footballer who played as a midfielder. He has made one appearance for the Cape Verde national team.

== Career ==
Silva has played club football in Portugal, Spain, Slovenia and Ukraine for Estrela da Amadora, Benfica B, Tenerife B, Drava Ptuj, Odivelas, Espinho and Metalurh Zaporizhya.

Silva made his international debut for Cape Verde in 2011.
