= David Harrer =

Austrian footballer

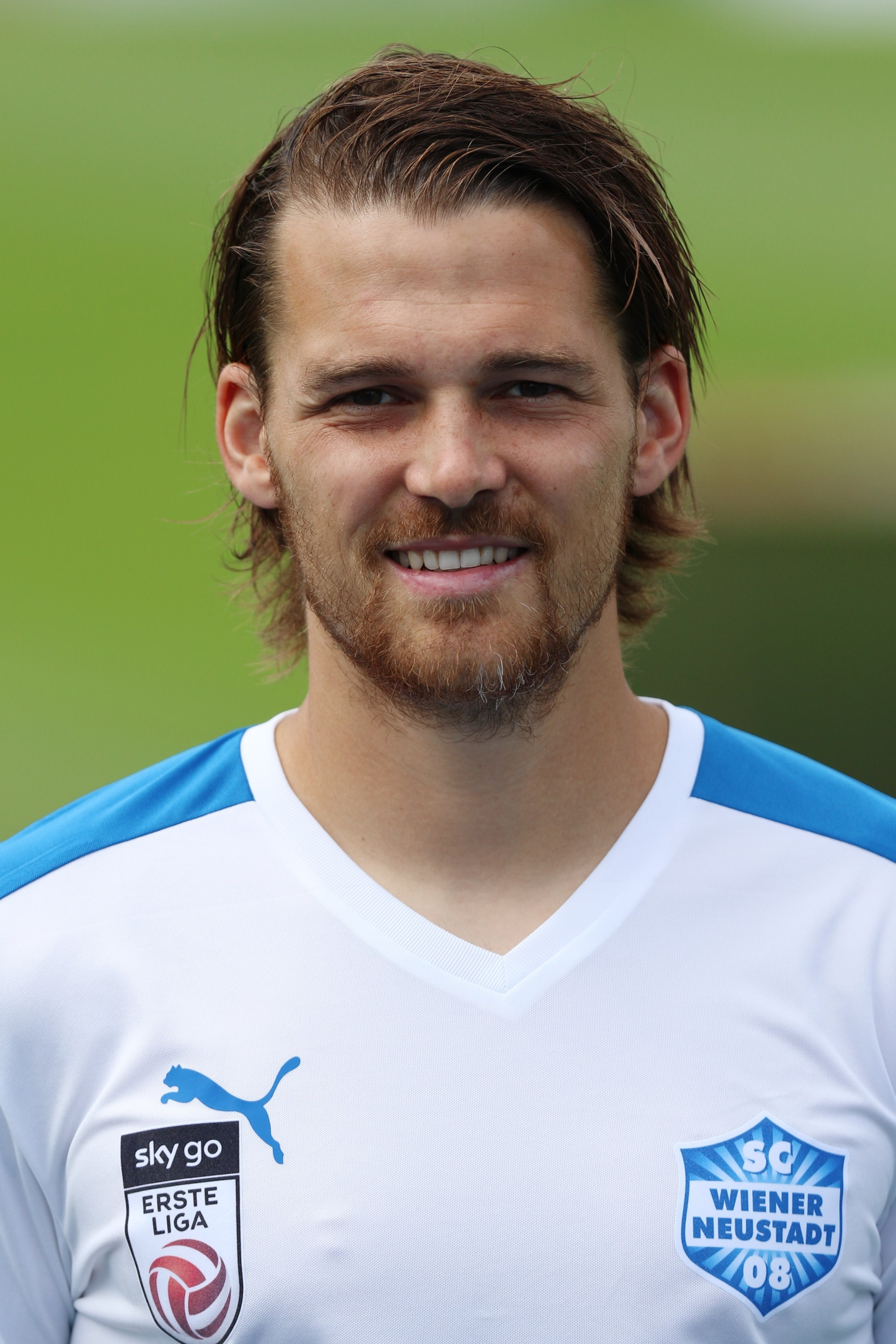
- David Harrer (2018)

Personal information
- Full name: David Harrer
- Date of birth: 24 April 1990 (age 36)
- Place of birth: Bruck an der Mur, Austria
- Height: 1.71 m (5 ft 7 in)
- Position: Left midfielder

Team information
- Current team: Bruck/Mur

Senior career*
Years	Team	Apps	(Gls)
2008–2012	Austria Wien	0	(0)
2011	→ Vaduz (loan)	11	(0)
2011–2012	→ Kapfenberger SV (loan)	16	(0)
2012–2013	Vaduz	19	(0)
2014–2015	Kapfenberger SV	42	(4)
2015–2019	Wiener Neustadt	81	(3)
2019–	Bruck/Mur	0	(0)
- * Club domestic league appearances and goals as of 23:50, 22 August 2019 (UTC)

David Harrer (born 24 April 1990) is an Austrian footballer who plays for SC Bruck/Mur.

== Career ==
=== Bruck/Mur ===
Ahead of the 2019/20 season, Harrer joined SC Bruck/Mur.
