= Martin Stehlik =

Austrian footballer

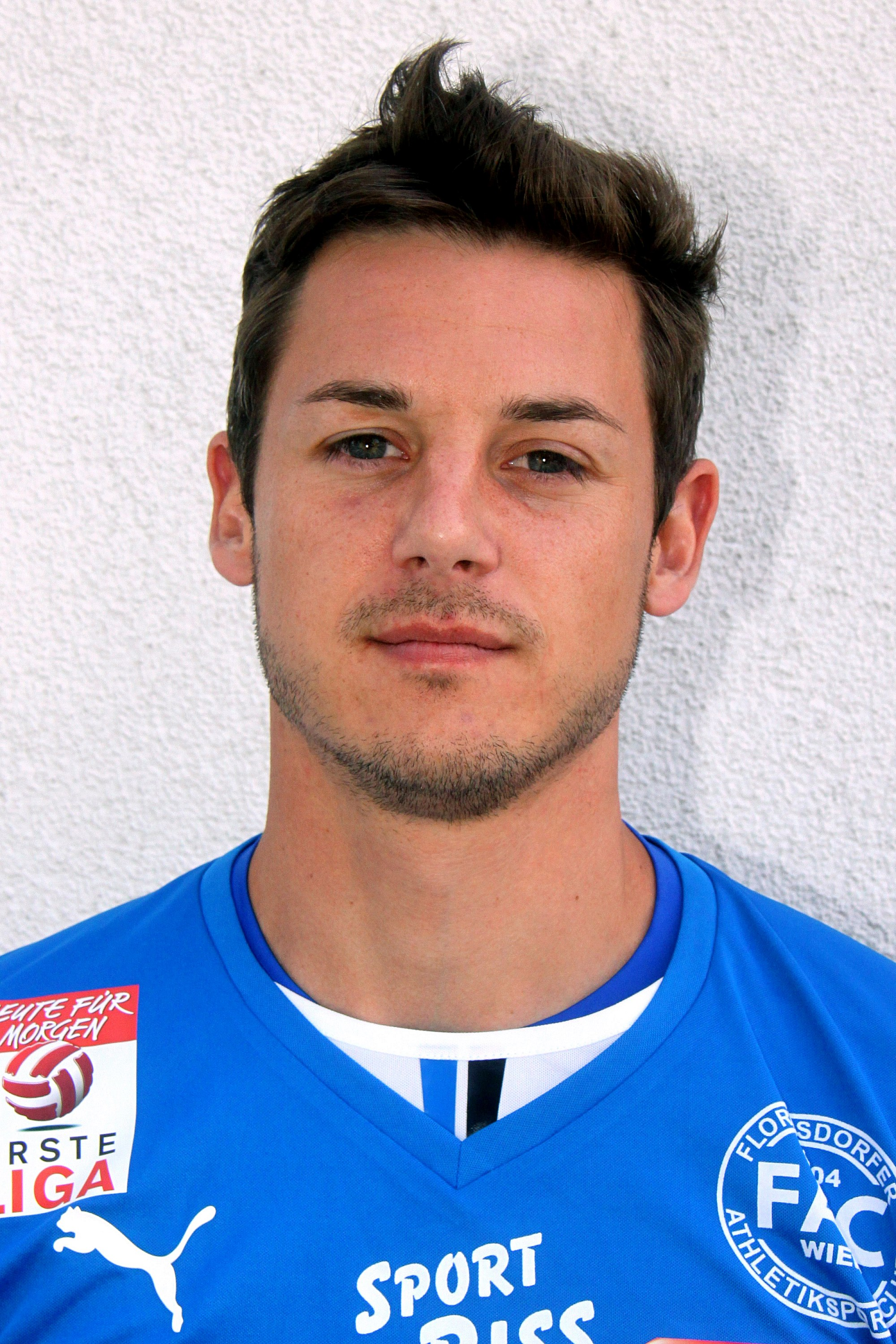
- Stehlik for Floridsdorfer in 2014

Personal information
- Date of birth: October 23, 1989 (age 37)
- Place of birth: Wien, Austria
- Height: 1.72 m (5 ft 7 1/2 in)
- Position: Midfielder

Senior career*
Years	Team	Apps	(Gls)
–2011	SV Gerasdorf/Stammersdorf	99	(18)
2011–2013	Wiener SK	37	(9)
2013–2016	Floridsdorfer AC	98	(7)
2016–2021	First Vienna FC		
- * Club domestic league appearances and goals as of 4 July 2016

Martin Stehlik (born October 23, 1989) is an Austrian footballer who currently plays as a midfielder for First Vienna FC.
