= Jiří Adamec =

Czech footballer (born 1982)

Personal information
- Date of birth: 21 March 1982 (age 44)
- Place of birth: Czechoslovakia
- Height: 1.84 m (6 ft 1/2 in)
- Position: Forward

Senior career*
Years	Team	Apps	(Gls)
2000–2002	Drnovice	13	(1)
2002–2004	Příbram	28	(1)
2004	→ Most (loan)		
2004–2005	Drnovice	29	(1)
2006–2008	České Budějovice	27	(2)
2013	Ober-Grafendorf	15	(9)

International career^{‡}
2003	Czech Republic U21	2	(0)
- * Club domestic league appearances and goals as of 31 December 2013 ‡ National team caps and goals as of 25 December 2014

Jiří Adamec (born 21 March 1982) is a Czech footballer who played as a forward. He made over 90 appearances in the Czech First League between 2000 and 2008.
