= David Parada =

Spanish footballer

Personal information
- Full name: David Parada Calvillo
- Date of birth: 8 March 1987 (age 39)
- Place of birth: Seville, Spain
- Height: 1.86 m (6 ft 1 in)
- Position: Midfielder

Youth career
- 2003–2004: Balón Cádiz
- 2004–2006: Cádiz

Senior career*
| Years | Team | Apps | (Gls) |
| 2006–2009 | Cádiz B | 61 | (1) |
| 2009–2010 | Ceuta | 3 | (0) |
| 2010–2012 | Badajoz | 52 | (1) |
| 2012–2013 | Teruel | 24 | (0) |
| 2013–2014 | Algeciras | 31 | (3) |
| 2014–2015 | St. Pölten | 26 | (1) |
| 2015–2017 | Badajoz | 61 | (2) |
- * Club domestic league appearances and goals as of 17 March 2019

David Parada Calvillo (born 8 March 1987) is a Spanish professional footballer who plays as a defensive midfielder.

== Club career ==
Born in Seville, Andalusia, Parada finished his formation with neighbouring Cádiz CF, but he could never break into the first team. Released in 2009 he resumed his career in Segunda División B, with AD Ceuta, CD Badajoz, CD Teruel and Algeciras CF, being relegated with all the clubs except the first.

On 13 June 2014, aged 27, Parada moved abroad for the first time in his career, joining SKN St. Pölten in the Austrian Football First League on a two-year contract.
