= Andreas Bammer =

Austrian footballer

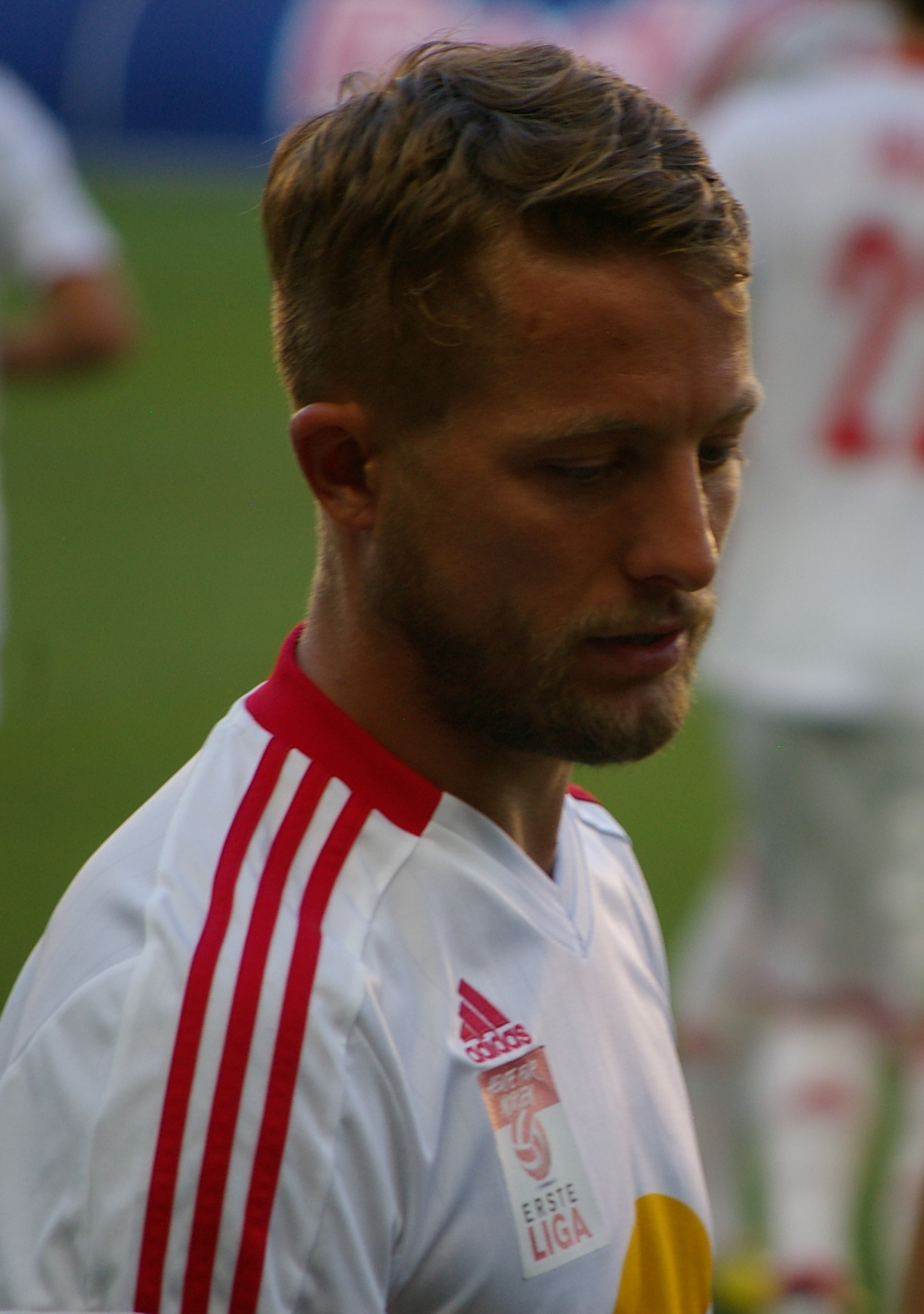
- Bammer in 2013

Personal information
- Date of birth: 18 July 1984 (age 42)
- Place of birth: Bad Ischl, Austria
- Position: Forward

Team information
- Current team: USK Anif
- Number: 17

Youth career
- SV Kirchdorf

Senior career*
Years	Team	Apps	(Gls)
2003–2004	SV Ried	2	(1)
2004–2006	FC Wels		(9)
2006–2008	SC Schwanenstadt	50	(23)
2008–2009	SV Ried	15	(0)
2009–2010	SC Rheindorf Altach	26	(9)
2010–2012	Wacker Innsbruck	25	(2)
2012–	USK Anif		
- * Club domestic league appearances and goals as of 17:36, 11 February 2012 (UTC)

Andreas Bammer (born 18 July 1984) is an Austrian footballer who played for SV Ried and FC Wacker Innsbruck in the Austrian Bundesliga.
