= Radovan Vujanović =

Austrian-Serbian footballer (born 1982)

Personal information
- Date of birth: 18 February 1982 (age 44)
- Place of birth: Aranđelovac, Yugoslavia
- Height: 1.83 m (6 ft 0 in)
- Position: Forward

Youth career
- Šumadija Aranđelovac
- Rapid Wien

Senior career*
Years	Team	Apps	(Gls)
–2003	Favoritner AC	1	(1)
2003–2004	DSV Fortuna 05	15	(5)
2004	Austria Wien II	28	(24)
2005	Paderborn	15	(2)
2006	Wehen Wiesbaden	11	(3)
2006–2008	Kickers Emden	67	(23)
2008–2010	Magdeburg	63	(35)
2010–2012	Hansa Rostock	33	(7)
2011–2012	→ Preußen Münster (loan)	26	(3)
2012–2015	LASK	92	(69)
2015–2016	Horn	28	(19)
2016–2019	ASKÖ Oedt	83	(77)
Total		462	(268)
- * Club domestic league appearances and goals

Radovan Vujanović (born 18 February 1982) is an Austrian-Serbian former professional footballer who played as a forward.

== Career ==
Vujanović was born in Aranđelovac, then Yugoslavia. He began his football career at his home town club FK Šumadija Aranđelovac before moving to Vienna. There he played for the amateur team of Rapid Wien, then Favoritner AC and DSV Fortuna 05, before he joined Austria Wien in January 2004, playing 14 matches in the third-tier Regionalliga Ost. His 19 goals for the club aroused interest from German third-tier side SC Paderborn who signed Vujanović in January 2005.

With his new club he won promotion to the 2. Bundesliga and played four matches in Germany's professional second-tier league before joining Regionalliga Süd side SV Wehen in January 2006. Despite scoring three goals in eleven matches, Vujanović moved on in the summer 2006, joining Kickers Emden in the Regionalliga Nord. After initial difficulties he established himself as a regular, scoring 22 goals in 60 matches.

After his Emden contract ran out, Vujanović joined 1. FC Magdeburg at the beginning of the 2007–08 season. He became a first team regular and was the only player to appear in all 34 matches in that season, also becoming the club's top scorer with 20 goals. For the 2009–10 season, Vujanović was made captain. When Magdeburg missed out on promotion to the 3. Liga, Vujanović dissolved his contract and joined Hansa Rostock for the 2010–11 season. He signed for Preußen Münster on loan in August 2011.
