= Michael Kölbl =

Austrian footballer

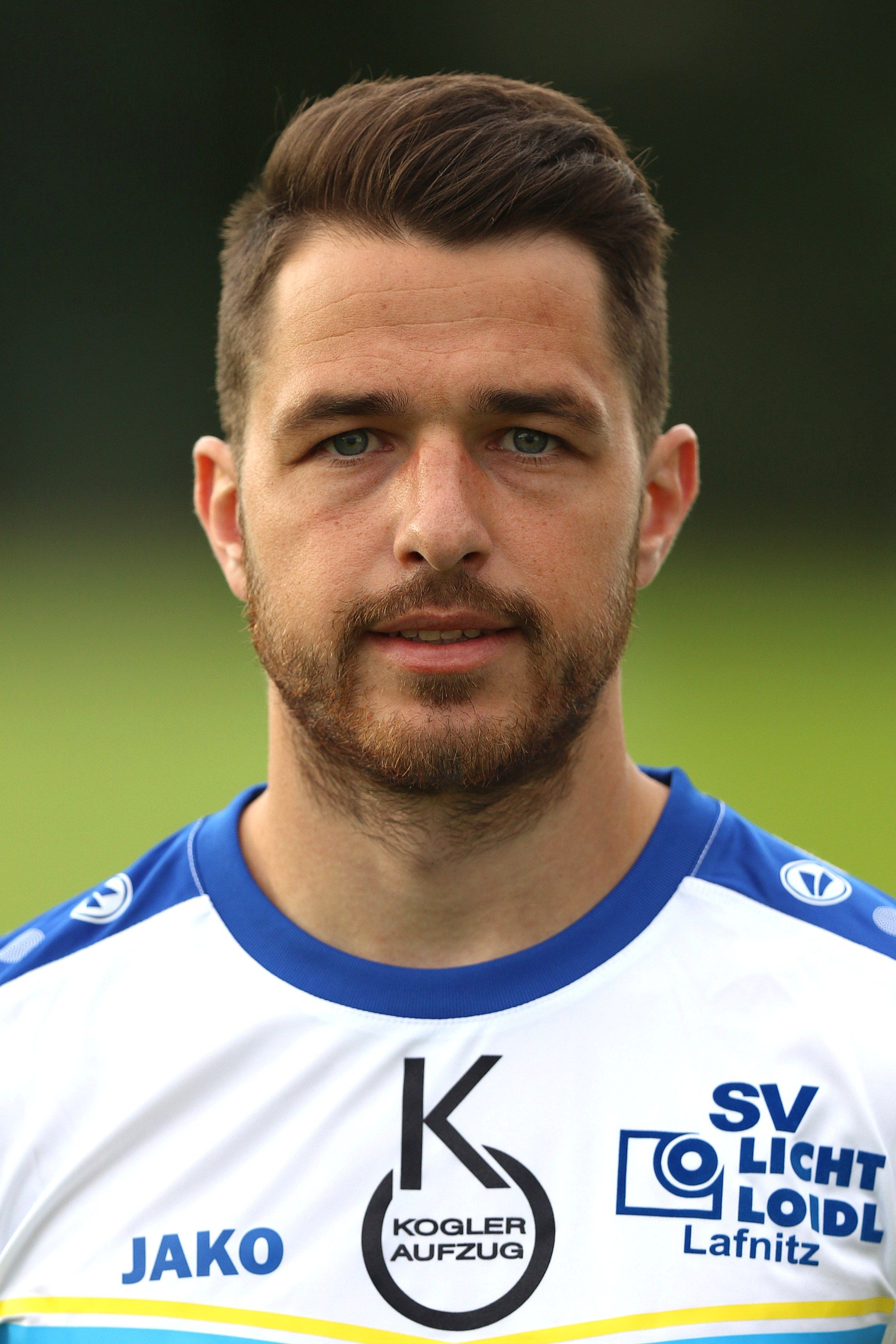

Personal information
- Date of birth: 20 November 1986 (age 39)
- Place of birth: Austria
- Height: 1.73 m (5 ft 8 in)
- Position: Midfielder

Youth career
- 1994–1999: USV Hartberg Umgebung
- 1999–2005: TSV Hartberg

Senior career*
Years	Team	Apps	(Gls)
2005–2007	TSV Hartberg II		
2007–2012	TSV Hartberg	118	(12)
2012–	SV Lafnitz	135	(40)
- * Club domestic league appearances and goals

Michael Kölbl (born 20 November 1986, in Austria) is an Austrian football player currently playing for SV Lafnitz. He has previously played for TSV Hartberg.

== Honours ==
=== Club ===
TSV Hartberg

- Austrian Regionalliga Central (1): 2008–09

SV Lafnitz

- Austrian Regionalliga Central (1) 2017–18
