= Matthias Koch =

Austrian footballer

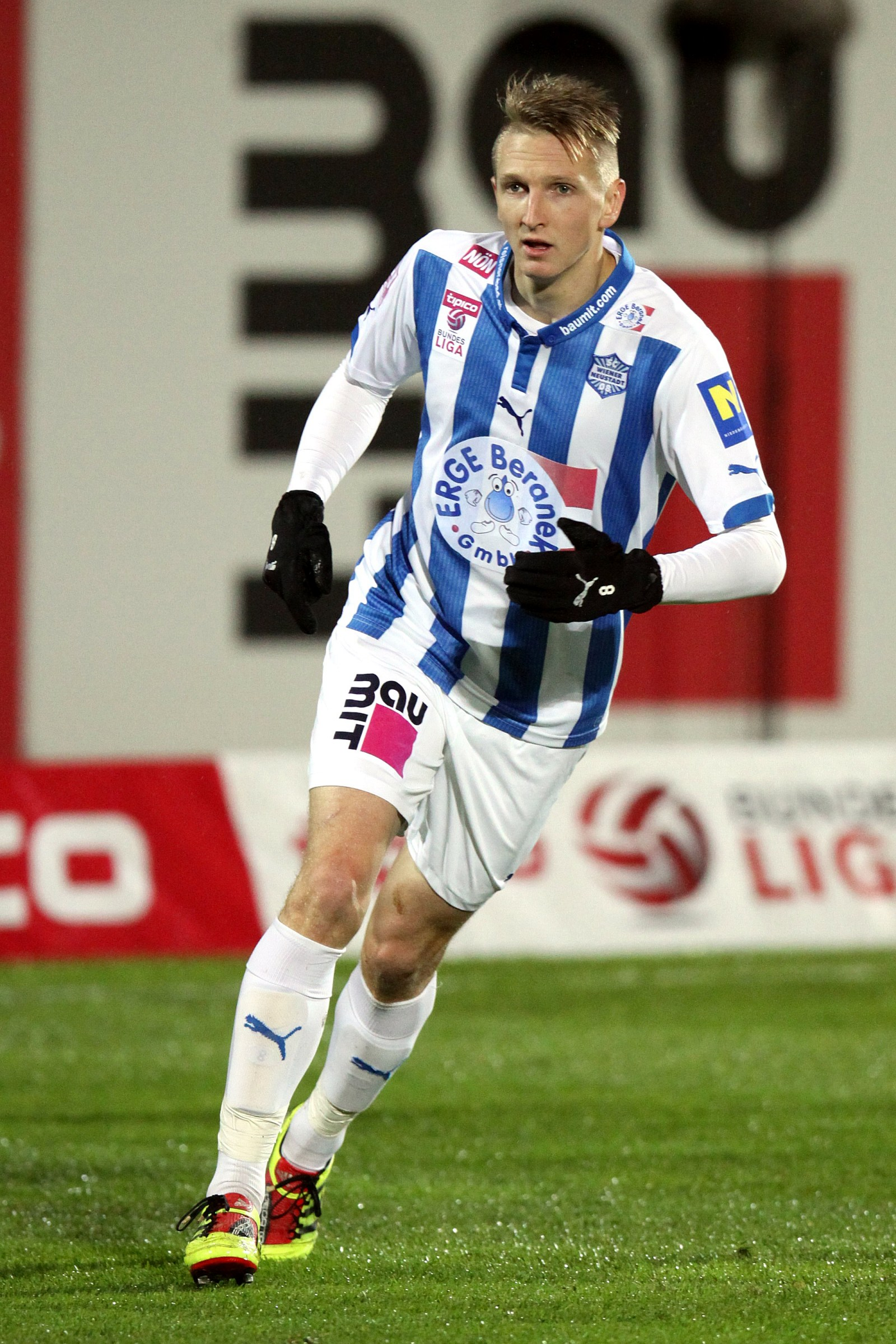
- Koch in 2014

Personal information
- Date of birth: April 1, 1988 (age 38)
- Place of birth: Feldkirch, Austria
- Height: 1.86 m (6 ft 1 in)
- Position: Midfielder

Team information
- Current team: FC Hard

Senior career*
Years	Team	Apps	(Gls)
2008–2011	SCR Altach	69	(6)
2011–2013	Sturm Graz	31	(1)
2011–2013	Sturm Graz B	2	(0)
2013–2015	Wiener Neustadt	49	(3)
2015–2016	Austria Klagenfurt	32	(2)
2016–	FC Hard	1	(0)
- * Club domestic league appearances and goals as of 22 July 2016

Matthias Koch (born 1 April 1988) is an Austrian football midfielder who currently plays for FC Hard.

He played for Sturm Graz until 2013, having been recruited in 2011.
