= Simon Zangerl =

Austrian footballer

Personal information
- Full name: Simon Zangerl
- Date of birth: 28 January 1990 (age 36)
- Place of birth: Austria
- Height: 1.78 m (5 ft 10 in)
- Position: Striker

Team information
- Current team: Wattens
- Number: 29

Youth career
- 1996–2004: SV Landeck
- 2004–2008: AKA Tirol

Senior career*
| Years | Team | Apps | (Gls) |
| 2008–2011 | Wacker Innsbruck II | 34 | (11) |
| 2011–2014 | Wattens | 97 | (72) |
| 2014–2015 | Wacker Innsbruck | 18 | (1) |
| 2014–2015 | Wacker Innsbruck II | 6 | (5) |
| 2015–2016 | Wattens | 30 | (32) |
| 2016–2017 | Atlético Baleares | 16 | (1) |
| 2017– | Wattens | 6 | (0) |
- * Club domestic league appearances and goals as of 1 December 2016

Simon Zangerl (born 28 January 1990) is an Austrian professional footballer who plays for Spanish club Wattens as a striker.

== Club career ==
After representing SV Landeck and AKA Tirol as a youth, Zangerl's first professional club was FC Wacker Innsbruck's reserve team. On 27 January 2011 he moved to WSG Wattens, and scored an impressive mark of 29 goals in 30 matches during the 2013–14 campaign.

On 30 May 2014, Zangerl returned to Wacker, now to the first team in Austrian Football First League. He played his first match as a professional on 25 July, coming on as a second half substitute for Thomas Hirschhofer in a 1–2 home loss against SC Austria Lustenau; he scored his first (and only) goal for the senior side on 19 September, in a 1–1 draw at the same opponent.

Zangerl returned to Wattens on 29 June 2015, and scored a career-best 32 goals in 30 matches. Exactly one year later he signed a two-year contract with Spanish Segunda División B club CD Atlético Baleares.
