= Rafael Pollack =

Austrian footballer

Personal information
- Date of birth: 28 October 1988 (age 38)
- Place of birth: Tulln, Austria
- Height: 1.83 m (6 ft 0 in)
- Position: Midfielder

Team information
- Current team: Admira Wacker (assistant)

Youth career
- 1996–1998: SV Königstetten
- 1998–2003: FC Tulln
- 2003–2005: BW Hollabrunn
- 2005–2006: Admira Wacker

Senior career*
Years	Team	Apps	(Gls)
2006–2007	Admira Wacker	11	(0)
2007	Würmla	13	(4)
2008–2009	NAC Breda	0	(0)
2009–2010	VfB Lübeck	3	(0)
2010	FAC	13	(5)
2010–2011	Waidhofen/Ybbs	10	(1)
2011–2012	FC Tulln	13	(8)
2012	FC Mistelbach	13	(2)
2012–2014	FC Ober-Grafendorf	50	(12)
2014–2017	Wiener SK	70	(18)
2017–2018	ASK Ebreichsdorf	23	(4)
2018–2020	Großweikersdorf SV	8	(6)
2021	Atzenbrugg/H. USV	0	(0)

Managerial career
- 2014–2015: Wiener SK (assistant)
- 2018: Rapid Wien (athletic coach)
- 2019: Rapid Wien II (athletic coach)
- 2021: Atzenbrugg/H. USV
- 2021–2022: FCM Traiskirchen (assistant)
- 2022: SV Horn (assistant)
- 2022–: Admira Wacker (assistant)
- * Club domestic league appearances and goals

Rafael Pollack (born 28 October 1988) is a retired Austrian footballer.

== Career ==
=== Coaching career ===
In the 2014–15 season, while playing for Wiener SK, Pollack also worked as a youth coach at the club. Pollack continued as an active player for a few years, before he was hired as an athletic coach at SK Rapid Wien under the staff of Goran Djuricin in the summer 2018. From the new year 2019, he was instead moved to the clubs reserve team backroom staff.

In December 2020, Pollack was appointed player-manager at USV Atzenbrugg-Heiligeneich at the age of 32. He left the position in November 2021, as he accepted a job offer from FCM Traiskirchen, becoming the clubs new assistant manager under head coach Zeljko Radovic, who he formerly worked together with at Rapid Wien. Radovic and his staff, including Pollack, was fired in May 2022.

In June 2022, Pollack joined SV Horn as assistant manager under his former VfB Lübeck-teammate, Rolf Landerl. On 20 September 2022, Pollack and Landerl resigned from their positions. On 6 November 2022, the duo landed a new job at Admira Wacker.
