= Daniel Brauneis =

Austrian footballer

Personal information
- Full name: Daniel Brauneis
- Date of birth: 29 August 1986 (age 40)
- Place of birth: Graz, Austria
- Height: 1.83 m (6 ft 0 in)
- Position: Forward

Team information
- Current team: SC Ritzing

Senior career*
Years	Team	Apps	(Gls)
2005–2009	Gratkorn	82	(18)
2009–2011	USV Allerheiligen	52	(41)
2011–2012	Grazer AK	29	(13)
2012–2013	SKU Amstetten	24	(18)
2013–2014	Wacker Innsbruck	7	(0)
2014–	SC Ritzing		
- * Club domestic league appearances and goals as of 14:26, 14 December 2013 (UTC)

Daniel Brauneis (born 29 August 1986) is an Austrian footballer who plays for SC Ritzing.
