= Patrick Seeger =

Austrian footballer

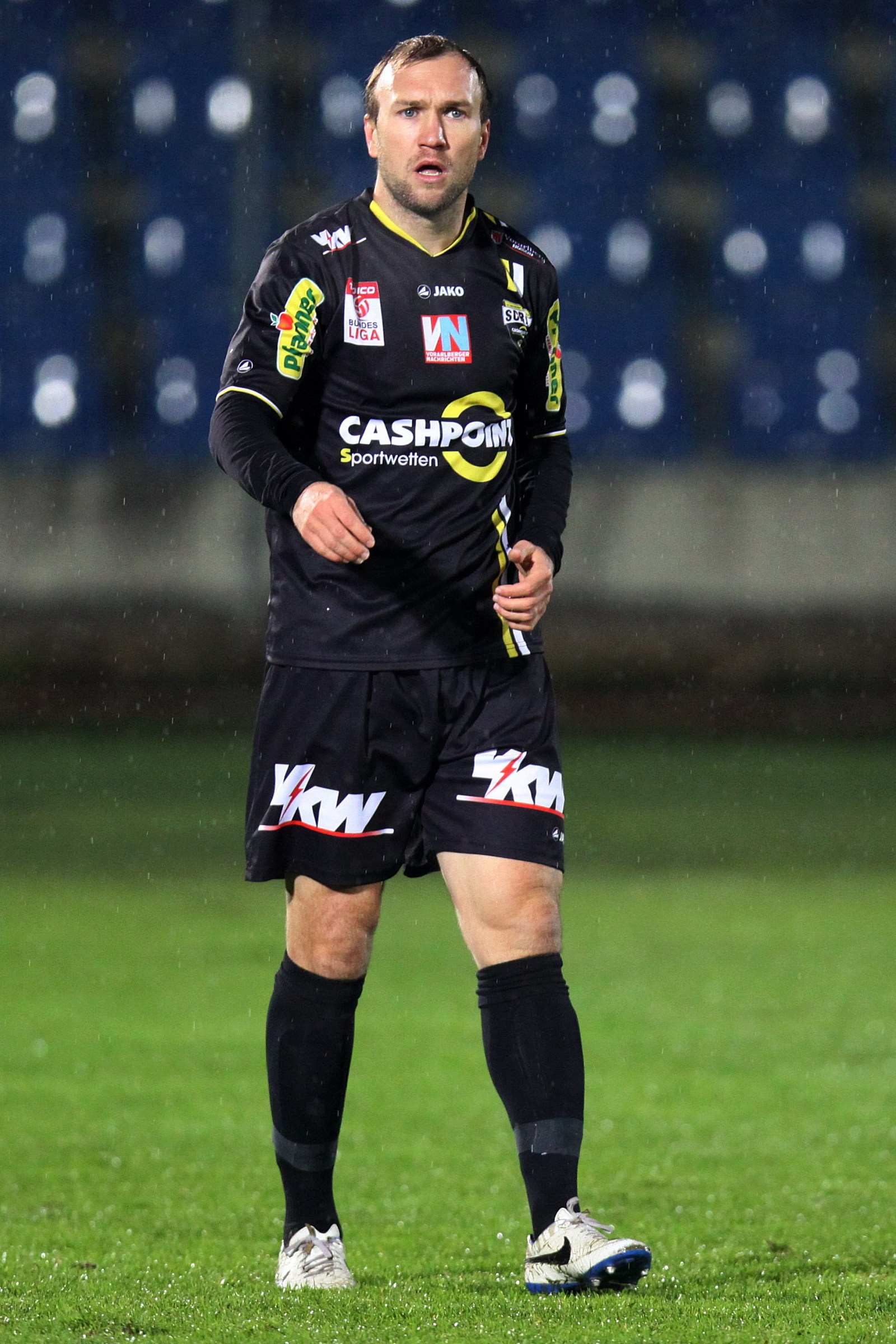

Personal information
- Date of birth: 25 August 1986 (age 40)
- Place of birth: Feldkirch, Austria
- Height: 1.78 m (5 ft 10 in)
- Position: Striker

Team information
- Current team: SC Rheindorf Altach
- Number: 26

Senior career*
Years	Team	Apps	(Gls)
–2005	AKA Vorarlberg		
2005–2008	SC Austria Lustenau	71	(16)
2008–2010	Red Bull Salzburg Juniors	15	(0)
2010–2011	FC Lustenau 07	33	(18)
2011–	SC Rheindorf Altach	117	(25)
2012–2013	→ Admira Wacker (loan)	7	(0)

International career^{‡}
2007–2008	Austria U-21	2	(0)
- * Club domestic league appearances and goals as of 13 March 2016 ‡ National team caps and goals as of 3 July 2012

Patrick Seeger (born 25 August 1986) is an Austrian footballer who currently plays as a striker for SC Rheindorf Altach.
