= Thomas Hirschhofer =

Austrian footballer

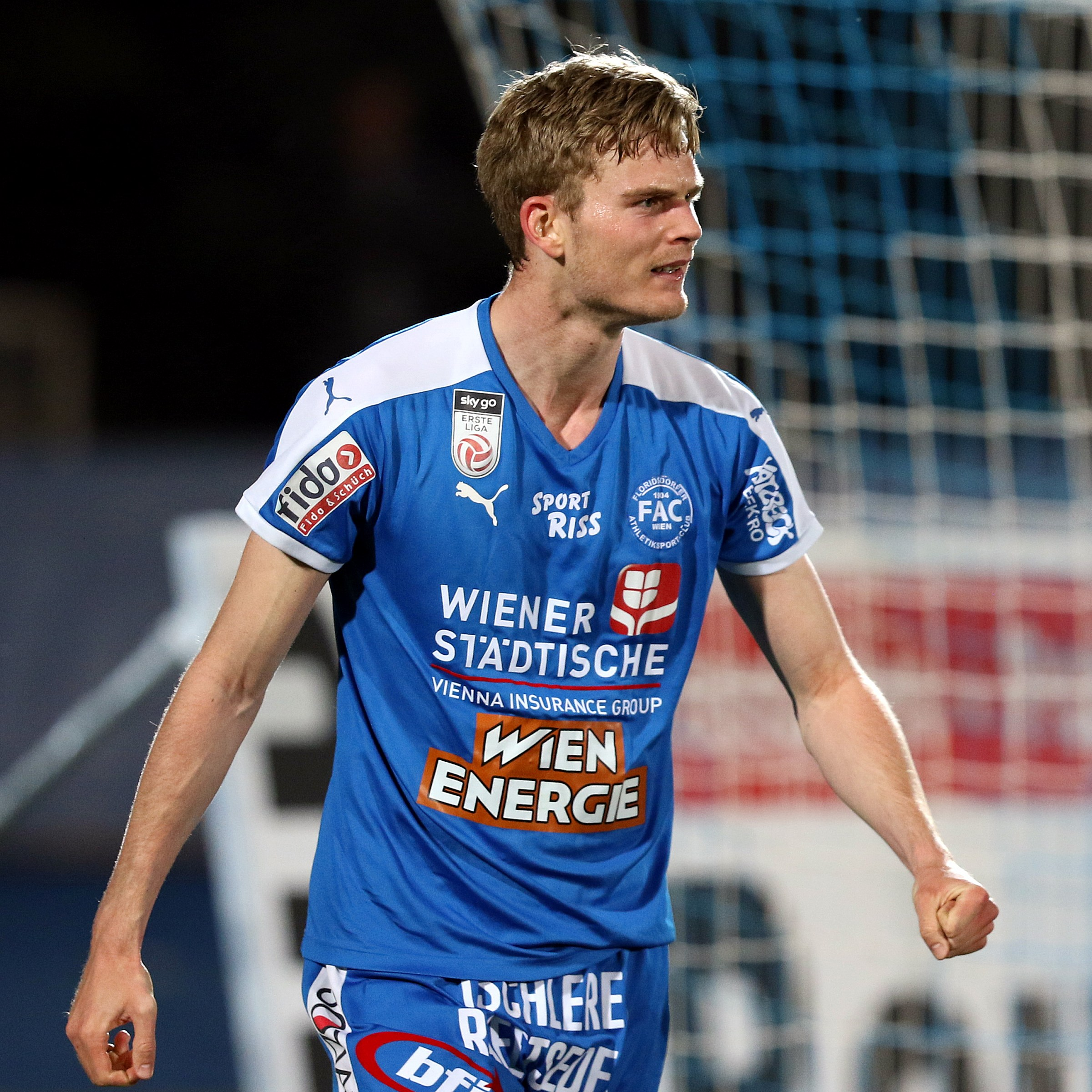

Personal information
- Full name: Thomas Hirschhofer
- Date of birth: 30 January 1992 (age 34)
- Place of birth: Graz, Austria
- Height: 1.92 m (6 ft 3 1/2 in)
- Position: Striker

Team information
- Current team: SC Kalsdorf
- Number: 9

Senior career*
Years	Team	Apps	(Gls)
2010–2014	Kapfenberger SV	20	(3)
2014–2016	Wacker Innsbruck	44	(5)
2016–2017	Floridsdorfer AC	32	(4)
2017–2018	SK Austria Klagenfurt	29	(15)
2018–2021	Wiener Sport-Club	53	(20)
2021–2024	DSV Leoben	97	(57)
2025–	SC Kalsdorf	44	(37)
- * Club domestic league appearances and goals as of 27 June 2026

Thomas Hirschhofer (born 30 January 1992) is an Austrian footballer who plays as a midfielder for SC Kalsdorf.
