= Sinisa Markovic =

Austrian footballer

Personal information
- Date of birth: 22 August 1988 (age 38)
- Height: 1.85 m (6 ft 1 in)
- Position: Midfielder

Team information
- Current team: SV Wallern
- Number: 27

Youth career
- 1996–2000: ASKÖ Donau Linz
- 2000–2006: LASK Linz

Senior career*
| Years | Team | Apps | (Gls) |
| 2006–2009 | LASK Linz II | | |
| 2009–2010 | SV Grün-Weiß Micheldorf | | |
| 2010–2011 | SV Traun | | |
| 2011–2013 | ASKÖ Donau Linz | | |
| 2013–2015 | SV Wallern | 57 | (23) |
| 2015–2017 | Blau-Weiß Linz | 57 | (15) |
| 2018 | ASKÖ Oedt | 24 | (10) |
| 2019–2020 | Hertha Wels | 29 | (11) |
| 2020– | SV Wallern | 11 | (7) |
- * Club domestic league appearances and goals as of 20:53, 25 October 2020 (UTC)

Sinisa Markovic (born 22 August 1988) is an Austrian football player. He plays for SV Wallern.

== Club career ==
He made his Austrian Football First League debut for FC Blau-Weiß Linz on 22 July 2016 in a game against WSG Wattens.
