= Christian Deutschmann =

Austrian footballer

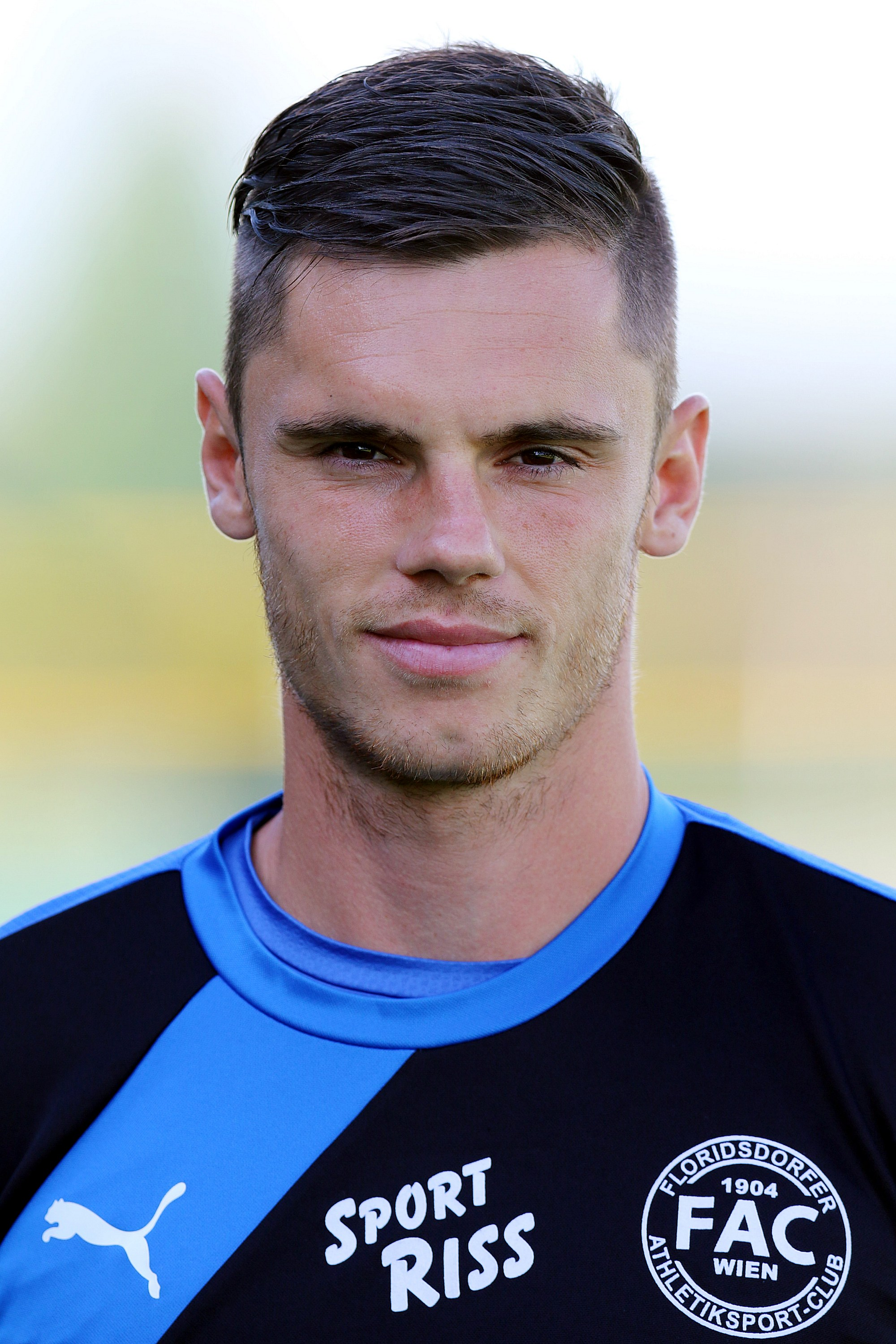

Personal information
- Date of birth: 11 February 1988 (age 38)
- Place of birth: Austria
- Height: 1.85 m (6 ft 1 in)
- Position: Defender

Youth career
- 1995–2001: SV Gössendorf
- 2001–2002: ASKÖ Murfeld
- 2002–2006: Grazer AK

Senior career*
Years	Team	Apps	(Gls)
2006–2007	Grazer AK II		
2007–2012	Grazer AK	142	(10)
2013	DSV Leoben		
2013–2014	SV Allerheiligen	12	(0)
2014	SC Kalsdorf	11	(0)
2014–2015	SC Wiener Neustadt	11	(0)
2015	→ FC Wacker Innsbruck (loan)	14	(0)
2015–2016	FC Wacker Innsbruck	26	(2)
2016–2017	Floridsdorfer AC	26	(2)
- * Club domestic league appearances and goals as of 14 April 2017

Christian Deutschmann (born 11 February 1988) is an Austrian footballer.
