= Michael Ambichl =

Austrian footballer (born 1991)

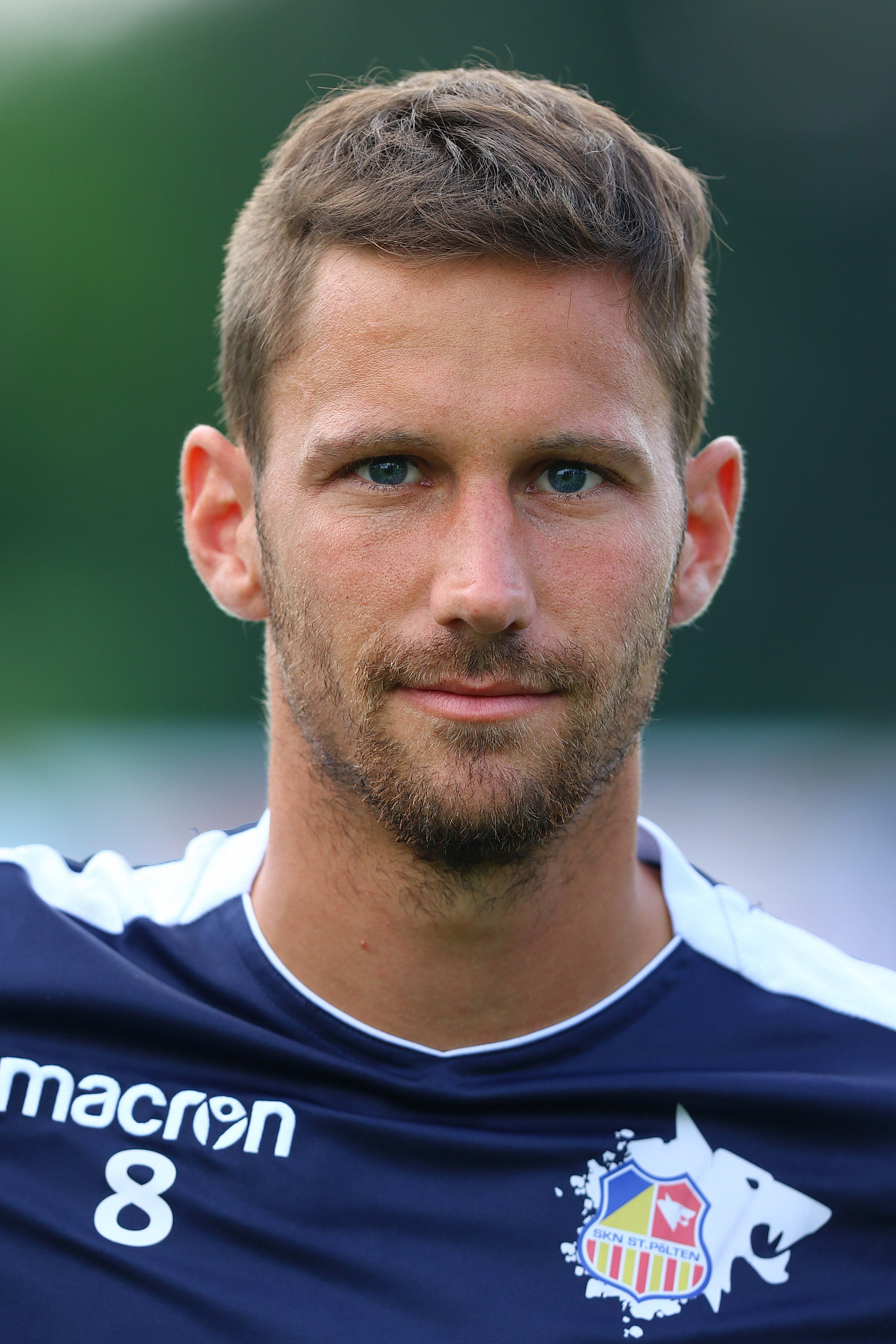

Personal information
- Date of birth: 26 April 1991 (age 35)
- Place of birth: Sankt Pölten, Austria
- Height: 1.80 m (5 ft 11 in)
- Position: Midfielder

Team information
- Current team: Kremser SC
- Number: 8

Senior career*
Years	Team	Apps	(Gls)
2009–2020	SKN St. Pölten	318	(16)
2021–	Kremser SC	116	(20)

International career^{‡}
2009	Austria U-18	1	(0)
- * Club domestic league appearances and goals as of 28 June 2026 ‡ National team caps and goals as of 26 May 2016

Michael Ambichl (born 26 April 1991) is an Austrian professional association football player who plays for Kremser SC.
