= Manuel Hartl =

Austrian footballer

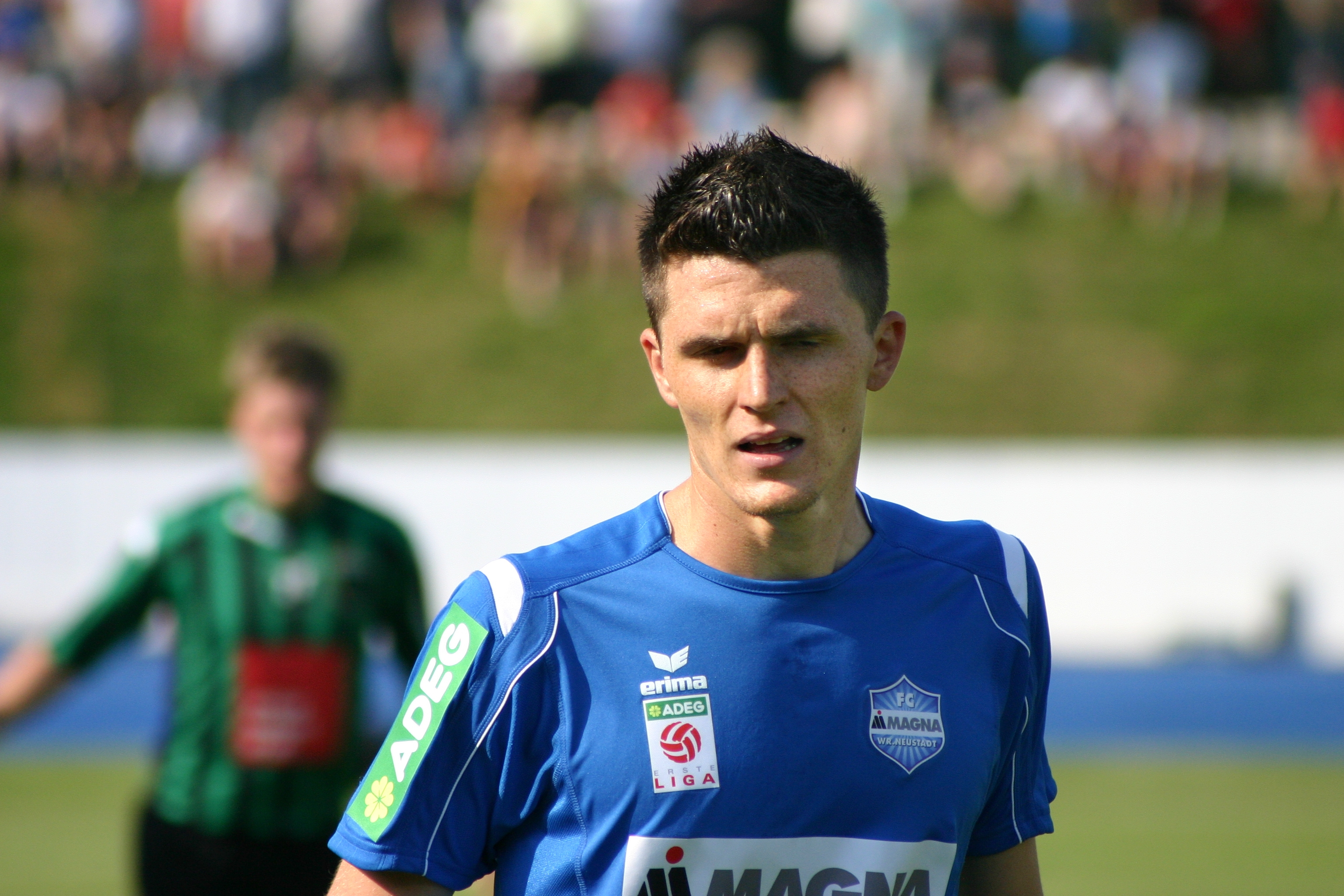

Personal information
- Full name: Manuel Hartl
- Date of birth: 31 December 1985 (age 40)
- Place of birth: Linz, Austria
- Height: 1.83 m (6 ft 0 in)
- Position: Attacking midfielder

Team information
- Current team: Hertha Wels
- Number: 19

Youth career
- –1998: Union Babenberg Linz Süd
- 1998–2002: SK Admira Linz

Senior career*
Years	Team	Apps	(Gls)
2002–2006	FC Pasching	2	(0)
2006	→ SC Schwanenstadt (loan)	13	(0)
2006–2008	SC Schwanenstadt	52	(5)
2008–2009	Wiener Neustadt	4	(0)
2009	Lustenau 07	6	(0)
2009–2010	FC Pasching	27	(0)
2010–2013	Blau-Weiß Linz	91	(23)
2013–2014	SV Horn	32	(8)
2014–2017	St. Pölten	77	(22)
2017–2019	Blau-Weiß Linz	54	(8)
2019–	Hertha Wels	4	(0)
- * Club domestic league appearances and goals as of 16:05, 22 August 2019 (UTC)

Manuel Hartl (born 31 December 1985) is an Austrian footballer who currently plays as a midfielder for WSC Hertha Wels.
