= 2016–17 SV Mattersburg season =

Mattersburg
2016–17 season
- Chairman: Martin Pucher
- Manager: Gerald Baumgartner
- Stadium: Pappelstadion
- Bundesliga: 10th
- Austrian Cup: Second Round vs SV Lafnitz
Home colours	Away colours

The 2016–17 SV Mattersburg season saw the club take part in the League and Cup.

== Squad ==
As of 21 January 2017.

Note: Flags indicate national team as defined under FIFA eligibility rules; some limited exceptions apply. Players may hold more than one non-FIFA nationality.

No.	Pos.	Nation	Player
2	DF	LAT	Vitālijs Maksimenko
3	MF	AUT	Peter Hawlik
4	DF	BIH	Nedeljko Malić
5	DF	ESP	César Ortiz
6	DF	AUT	Philipp Erhardt
7	MF	AUT	Manuel Seidl
8	MF	AUT	Alois Höller
9	FW	HUN	Barnabás Varga
10	MF	ESP	Jano
11	FW	AUT	Alexander Ibser
13	FW	AUT	Florian Templ
14	MF	AUT	Dominik Doleschal
15	MF	AUT	Sven Sprangler
16	MF	BIH	Mario Grgić
17	MF	AUT	Patrick Farkas

No.	Pos.	Nation	Player
18	DF	AUT	Lukas Rath
19	FW	AUT	Stefan Maierhofer
20	MF	AUT	Michael Perlak
21	GK	AUT	Markus Kuster
22	GK	AUT	Markus Böcskör
23	MF	AUT	Julius Ertlthaler
24	GK	AUT	Julian Rosenstingl
25	DF	AUT	Michael Novak
26	DF	ESP	Fran Rodríguez
27	MF	AUT	Thorsten Röcher
28	DF	AUT	Francesco Lovrić
29	FW	GHA	David Atanga (on loan from Red Bull Salzburg)
31	DF	AUT	Thorsten Mahrer
32	FW	AUT	Markus Pink
33	FW	AUT	Patrick Bürger

== Transfers ==
=== Summer ===
In: Note: Flags indicate national team as defined under FIFA eligibility rules; some limited exceptions apply. Players may hold more than one non-FIFA nationality.

No.	Pos.	Nation	Player
9	FW	HUN	Barnabás Varga (from (Austria) SV Eberau)
28	DF	AUT	Francesco Lovrić (from (Germany) VfB Stuttgart)

Out: Note: Flags indicate national team as defined under FIFA eligibility rules; some limited exceptions apply. Players may hold more than one non-FIFA nationality.

No.	Pos.	Nation	Player
1	GK	AUT	Thomas Borenitsch
9	FW	AUT	Ingo Klemen
19	MF	AUT	Manuel Prietl (to (Germany) Arminia Bielefeld)

=== Winter ===
In: Note: Flags indicate national team as defined under FIFA eligibility rules; some limited exceptions apply. Players may hold more than one non-FIFA nationality.

No.	Pos.	Nation	Player
5	DF	ESP	César Ortiz (from (Austria) Rheindorf Altach)
19	FW	AUT	Stefan Maierhofer
29	FW	GHA	David Atanga (loan from (Austria) Red Bull Salzburg)

Out: Note: Flags indicate national team as defined under FIFA eligibility rules; some limited exceptions apply. Players may hold more than one non-FIFA nationality.

No.	Pos.	Nation	Player

== Competitions ==
=== Bundesliga ===
==== Table ====
Pos	Team	Pld	W	D	L	GF	GA	GD	Pts
5	Rapid Wien	36	12	10	14	52	42	+10	46
6	Admira Wacker Mödling	36	13	7	16	36	55	−19	46
7	Mattersburg	36	12	7	17	39	54	−15	43
8	Wolfsberger AC	36	11	9	16	40	59	−19	42
9	St. Pölten	36	9	10	17	41	60	−19	37

Source: weltfussball.de (in German), Soccerway
Rules for classification: 1) Points; 2) Goal difference; 3) Goals scored; 4) Matches won; 5) Away matches won; 6) Head-to-head points; 7) Head-to-head goal difference; 8) Head-to-head goals scored.

==== Results summary ====
Overall								Home						Away					
Pld	W	D	L	GF	GA	GD	Pts	W	D	L	GF	GA	GD	W	D	L	GF	GA	GD
36	12	7	17	39	54	−15	43	9	3	6	21	21	0	3	4	11	18	33	−15

Last updated: 28 May 2017.
Source: See results

==== Results by matchday ====
Matchday	1	2	3	4	5	6	7	8	9	10	11	12	13	14	15	16	17	18	19	20	21	22	23	24	25	26	27	28	29	30	31	32	33	34	35	36
Ground	H	A	H	H	A	H	A	A	H	A	H	A	A	H	A	H	H	A	H	A	H	H	A	H	A	A	H	A	H	A	A	H	A	H	H	A
Result	L	L	L	W	L	D	L	L	D	L	L	D	L	W	D	L	D	L	W	L	W	W	L	W	L	D	W	W	L	W	D	W	L	W	L	W
Position	10	10	10	9	10	10	10	10	10	10	10	10	10	10	10	10	10	10	10	10	10	9	9	9	9	9	9	9	9	7	7	7	7	7	7	7

Source: See Results
A = Away; H = Home; W = Win; D = Draw; L = Loss

==== Results ====
24 July 2016 1	SV Mattersburg	0 – 1	Admira Wacker	Mattersburg
19:00 CEST (UTC+2)	Malić (yellow card) 62'; Sprangler (yellow card) 76'	Summary	Knasmüllner 19'; Toth (yellow card) 49'; Wostry (yellow card) 57'; Siebenhandl (yellow card) 90+3'	Stadium: Pappelstadion; Attendance: 3,155; Referee: Julian Weinberger

31 July 2016 2	Austria Wien	3 – 1	SV Mattersburg	Vienna
16:30 CEST (UTC+2)	Lucas Venuto 64' (pen.), 90+4'; Tajouri 67'	Summary	Bürger 28'; Sprangler (yellow card) 58'; Malić (yellow card) 77'	Stadium: Ernst-Happel-Stadion; Attendance: 5,143; Referee: Alexander Harkam

6 August 2016 3	SV Mattersburg	0 – 2	Sturm Graz	Mattersburg
16:00 CEST (UTC+2)		Summary	Alar 48'; Edomwonyi 63'; Jeggo (yellow card) 77'	Stadium: Pappelstadion; Attendance: 3,311; Referee: Dieter Muckenhammer

13 August 2016 4	SV Mattersburg	3 – 1	Wolfsberger AC	Mattersburg
18:30 CEST (UTC+2)	Perlak 2' (pen.), 56' (pen.); Pink 34'; Bürger (yellow card) 77'; Höller (yellow card) 85'	Summary	Nutz 24'; Drescher (yellow card) 53'; Kofler (yellow card) 55'	Stadium: Pappelstadion; Attendance: 2,377; Referee: Harald Lechner

20 August 2016 5	Red Bull Salzburg	3 – 1	SV Mattersburg	Wals-Siezenheim
18:30 CEST (UTC+2)	Minamino 49'; Lainer 88'; Laimer 90+1'	Summary	Jano (yellow card) 43'; Röcher 76'	Stadium: Red Bull Arena; Attendance: 4,952; Referee: Andreas Kollegger

27 August 2016 6	SV Mattersburg	1 – 1	St. Pölten	Mattersburg
18:30 CEST (UTC+2)	Perlak (yellow card) 38'; Malić (yellow card) 81'; Mahrer 84'	Summary	Pîrvulescu (yellow card) 15'; Huber (yellow card) 31'; Lucas 63'; Brandl (yellow card) 82'	Stadium: Pappelstadion; Attendance: 2,509; Referee: Alexander Harkam

10 September 2016 7	Rheindorf Altach	2 – 1	SV Mattersburg	Altach
18:30 CEST (UTC+2)	Galvão (yellow card) 45+1' (yellow-red card) 90+3'; Zivotic 78', 84'	Summary	Sprangler (yellow card) 23'; Rath (yellow card) 59'; Perlak 90+4' (pen.)	Stadium: Stadion Schnabelholz; Attendance: 4,790; Referee: Dieter Muckenhammer

18 September 2016 8	Rapid Wien	3 – 0	SV Mattersburg	Vienna
19:00 CEST (UTC+2)	Schrammel (yellow card) 40'; Schaub 62'; Szántó 65'; Pavelić 83'	Summary	Jano (yellow card) 43'; Maksimenko (yellow card) 54'	Stadium: Allianz Stadion; Attendance: 19,241; Referee: Manuel Schüttengruber

24 September 2016 9	SV Mattersburg	1 – 1	SV Ried	Mattersburg
18:30 CEST (UTC+2)	Rath (yellow card) 41'; Höller (yellow card) 57'; Perlak (yellow card) 66'; Farkas (yellow card) 66'; Grgić 83'; Templ (yellow card) 88'	Summary	Ademi (yellow card) 49'; Özgür (yellow card) 57'; Chessa (yellow card) 58'; Žulj (yellow card) 82'; 90+1'	Stadium: Pappelstadion; Attendance: 1,913; Referee: Alexander Harkam

1 October 2016 10	Admira Wacker	1 – 0	SV Mattersburg	Maria Enzersdorf
18:30 CEST (UTC+2)	Sax (yellow card) 34'; Ebner (yellow card) 40'; Wostry (yellow card) 46'; Zwierschitz (yellow card) 76'; Mahrer 82' (o.g.)	Summary		Stadium: Bundesstadion Südstadt; Attendance: 2,252; Referee: Harald Lechner

16 October 2016 11	SV Mattersburg	0 – 2	Austria Wien	Mattersburg
CEST (UTC+2)	Grgić (yellow card) 58'; Sprangler (yellow card) 70'	Summary	Grünwald 49'; Filipović (yellow card) 66'; Martschinko 87'	Stadium: Pappelstadion; Attendance: 3,604; Referee: Dieter Muckenhammer

22 October 2016 12	Sturm Graz	2 – 2	SV Mattersburg	Graz
16:00 CEST (UTC+2)	Schulz (yellow card) 31'; Alar 51' (yellow card) 78'; Hierländer 84'	Summary	Bürger 36' (yellow card) 81'; Jano (yellow card) 49'; Fran (yellow card) 74' (goal) 90+5'; Höller (yellow card) 78'; Ibser (yellow card) 85'	Stadium: UPC-Arena; Attendance: 11,379; Referee: Markus Hameter

29 October 2016 13	Wolfsberger AC	3 – 0	SV Mattersburg	Wolfsberg
18:30 CEST (UTC+2)	Hüttenbrenner 7'; Prosenik 71'; Wernitznig 84'	Summary		Stadium: Lavanttal-Arena; Attendance: 3,154; Referee: Manuel Schüttengruber

6 November 2016 14	SV Mattersburg	2 – 1	Red Bull Salzburg	Mattersburg
16:30 CET (UTC+1)	Erhardt 10'; Jano 18'; Bürger (yellow card) 51'; Farkas (yellow card) 81'	Summary	Berisha 2'; Upamecano (yellow card) 17' (yellow-red card) 90+2'	Stadium: Pappelstadion; Attendance: 2,200; Referee: Rene Eisner

19 November 2016 15	St. Pölten	2 – 2	SV Mattersburg	Sankt Pölten
18:30 CET (UTC+1)	Mader (yellow card) 59'; Ambichl (yellow card) 65'; Holzmann 70'; Keita 89' (pen.)	Summary	Varga 74'; Röcher 87'; Erhardt (yellow card) 88'	Stadium: NV Arena; Attendance: 2,405; Referee: Robert Schörgenhofer

26 November 2016 16	SV Mattersburg	1 – 2	Rheindorf Altach	Mattersburg
18:30 CET (UTC+1)	Röcher (yellow card) 35'; Höller (yellow card) 57'; Templ 69'; Sprangler (yellow card) 90'	Summary	Dovedan 23'; Ngamaleu (yellow card) 31' (yellow-red card) 45+1'; Ngwat-Mahop 90+5'	Stadium: Pappelstadion; Attendance: 1,890; Referee: Markus Hameter

30 November 2016 17	SV Mattersburg	1 – 1	Rapid Wien	Mattersburg
20:30 CET (UTC+1)	Rath (yellow card) 22'; Templ (yellow card) 56'; Höller (yellow card) 59'; Jano 72' (yellow card) 74'	Summary	Schrammel (yellow card) 71' (yellow-red card) 87'; Malicsek 76'	Stadium: Pappelstadion; Attendance: 3,345; Referee: Dominik Ouschan

3 December 2016 18	SV Ried	2 – 1	SV Mattersburg	Ried im Innkreis
18:30 CET (UTC+1)	Möschl 80' (yellow card) 81'; Reifeltshammer 88'	Summary	Bürger 5' (yellow card) 9'; Varga (yellow card) 11'; Sprangler (yellow card) 62' (yellow-red card) 78'; Erhardt (yellow card) 89'	Stadium: Keine Sorgen Arena; Attendance: 2,448; Referee: Julian Weinberger

100 December 2016 19	SV Mattersburg	2 – 0	Admira Wacker	Mattersburg
18:30 CET (UTC+1)	Fran 24'; Templ 48'; Röcher (yellow card) 60'	Summary	Monschein (yellow card) 68'	Stadium: Pappelstadion; Attendance: 1,896; Referee: Gerhard Grobelnik

17 December 2016 20	Austria Wien	2 – 0	SV Mattersburg	Vienna
18:30 CET (UTC+1)	Venuto 53'; Filipović 57'	Summary	Höller (yellow card) 21'; Bürger (yellow card) 71'	Stadium: Franz Horr Stadium; Attendance: 5,790; Referee: Alexander Harkam

11 February 2017 21	SV Mattersburg	1 – 0	Sturm Graz	Mattersburg
18:30 CET (UTC+1)	Röcher 35'; Höller (yellow card) 53'	Summary	Gruber (yellow card) 70'	Stadium: Pappelstadion; Attendance: 3,200; Referee: Christopher Jäger

18 February 2017 22	SV Mattersburg	2 – 1	Wolfsberger AC	Mattersburg
18:30 CET (UTC+1)	Röcher 8'; Höller (yellow card) 37'; Maierhofer (yellow card) 59' (goal) 61'; Jano (yellow card) 84'	Summary	Orgill 14'; Rnić (yellow card) 38'; Klem (yellow card) 90'	Stadium: Pappelstadion; Attendance: 2,200; Referee: Andreas Heiß

25 February 2017 23	Red Bull Salzburg	1 – 0	SV Mattersburg	Wals-Siezenheim
18:30 CET (UTC+1)	Oberlin 61'; Berisha (yellow card) 72'; Samassékou (yellow card) 84'; Ulmer (yellow card) 90+3'	Summary	Novak (yellow card) 12'; Malić (yellow card) 69'; Fran (yellow card) 73'; Rath (yellow card) 80'	Stadium: Red Bull Arena; Attendance: 5,234; Referee: Dieter Muckenhammer

4 March 2017 24	SV Mattersburg	1 – 0	St. Pölten	Mattersburg
18:30 CET (UTC+1)	Rath (yellow card) 36'; Höller (yellow card) 52'; Fran 72'	Summary	Perchtold (yellow card) 62'; Petrovic (yellow card) 82'	Stadium: Pappelstadion; Attendance: 3,700; Referee: Harald Lechner

11 March 2017 25	Rheindorf Altach	3 – 0	SV Mattersburg	Altach
18:30 CET (UTC+1)	Aigner 5'; Sakic 15'; Luxbacher (yellow card) 29'; Ngamaleu 54'; Salomon (yellow card) 82'	Summary	Jano (yellow card) 61'; Maksimenko (yellow card) 78'	Stadium: Stadion Schnabelholz; Attendance: 5,369; Referee: Oliver Drachta

18 March 2017 26	Rapid Wien	1 – 1	SV Mattersburg	Vienna
16:00 CET (UTC+1)	Kvilitaia (yellow card) 31' (goal) 45+2'; Hofmann (yellow card) 87'	Summary	Atanga 1'; Maierhofer (yellow card) 20'; Röcher (yellow card) 59'; Höller (yellow card) 87'	Stadium: Allianz Stadion; Attendance: 19,116; Referee: Rene Eisner

1 April 2017 27	SV Mattersburg	2 – 1	SV Ried	Mattersburg
18:30 CEST (UTC+2)	Perlak (yellow card) 41'; Bürger 84', 86'	Summary	Ademi 48'; Reifeltshammer (yellow card) 68'; Egho (yellow card) 83'	Stadium: Pappelstadion; Attendance: 5,592; Referee: Markus Hameter

8 April 2017 28	Admira Wacker	0 – 2	SV Mattersburg	Maria Enzersdorf
19:30 CEST (UTC+2)	Toth (yellow card) 9' (yellow-red card) 52'; Strauss (yellow card) 73'; Leitner (red card) 77'; Vastić (yellow card) 89'	Summary	Ortiz (yellow card) 40'; Röcher 55'; Malić (yellow card) 57'; Bürger 71'	Stadium: Bundesstadion Südstadt; Attendance: 2,418; Referee: Oliver Drachta

16 April 2017 29	SV Mattersburg	0 – 3	Austria Wien	Mattersburg
16:00 CEST (UTC+2)	Höller (yellow card) 59'; Maierhofer (yellow card) 62'	Summary	Kayode 21'; Grünwald 45'; Serbest (yellow card) 48'; Rotpuller (yellow card) 53'; Filipović (yellow card) 73'; Pires 75'; Holzhauser (yellow card) 80'	Stadium: Pappelstadion; Attendance: 6,100; Referee: Rene Eisner

22 April 2017 30	Sturm Graz	0 – 2	SV Mattersburg	Graz
16:00 CEST (UTC+2)		Report	Ortiz (yellow card) 3'; Atanga 18' (yellow card) 87'; Erhardt (yellow card) 24'; Röcher (yellow card) 46'; Maierhofer (yellow card) 51'; Bürger 90'	Stadium: UPC-Arena; Attendance: 8,895; Referee: Dominik Ouschan

29 April 2017 31	Wolfsberger AC	2 – 2	SV Mattersburg	Wolfsberg
18:30 CEST (UTC+2)	Offenbacher 10', 66' (yellow card) 41'; Sollbauer (yellow card) 65'	Report	Malić (yellow card) 39'; Atanga (yellow card) 68'; Röcher 86'; Höller 87'	Stadium: Lavanttal-Arena; Attendance: 3,154; Referee: Alexander Harkam

6 May 2017 32	SV Mattersburg	2 – 1	Red Bull Salzburg	Mattersburg
16:00 CEST (UTC+2)	Maierhofer 25'; Höller (yellow card) 41'; Atanga 48'; Bürger (yellow card) 90+4'	Report	Wanderson 10'; Schwegler (yellow card) 55'; Miranda (yellow card) 67'; Walke (yellow card) 70'	Stadium: Pappelstadion; Attendance: 5,200; Referee: Harald Lechner

13 May 2017 33	St. Pölten	1 – 0	SV Mattersburg	Sankt Pölten
18:30 CEST (UTC+2)	Huber (yellow card) 45'; Hartl (yellow card) 55'; Martic 72'	Report	Maierhofer (yellow card) 38'; Röcher (yellow card) 46'; Malić (yellow card) 53'; Erhardt (yellow card) 75'	Stadium: NV Arena; Attendance: 3,673; Referee: Julian Weinberger

20 May 2017 34	SV Mattersburg	1 – 0	Rheindorf Altach	Mattersburg
18:30 CEST (UTC+2)	Malić (yellow card) 5'; Novak (yellow card) 68'; Höller 82'	Report	Jäger (yellow card) 75'; Schreiner (yellow card) 80'; Salomon (yellow card) 85'	Stadium: Pappelstadion; Attendance: 3,356; Referee: Sebastian Gishamer

25 May 2017 35	SV Mattersburg	1 – 3	Rapid Wien	Mattersburg
16:30 CEST (UTC+2)	Höller 41' (yellow card) 46'	Report	Kuen (yellow card) 23'; Joelinton 38'; Schwab (yellow card) 58'; Traustason 84'; Malić 87' (o.g.)	Stadium: Pappelstadion; Attendance: 9,527; Referee: Oliver Drachta

28 May 2017 36	SV Ried	2 – 3	SV Mattersburg	Ried im Innkreis
16:30 CEST (UTC+2)	Elsneg (yellow card) 35'; Nutz 53'; Möschl 83'	Report	Perlak 4'; Bürger 20' (yellow card) 25'; Seidl (yellow card) 67' (goal) 78'; Mahrer (yellow card) 75'	Stadium: Keine Sorgen Arena; Attendance: 6,611; Referee: Dominik Ouschan

=== Austrian Cup ===
17 July 2016 First Round	USV Rudersdorf	0 – 7	SV Mattersburg	Rudersdorf
17:00 CEST (UTC+2)		Summary	Grgić 11'; Bürger 16'; Röcher 26'; Ibser 59', 69'; Seidl 73'; Templ 88'	Stadium: Sportplaatz Rudersdorf; Attendance: 804; Referee: Alan Kijas

21 September 2016 Second Round	SV Lafnitz	0 – 0 (4 – 3 p)	SV Mattersburg	Lafnitz
19:00 CEST (UTC+2)	C.Gschiel (yellow card) 83'; Kager (yellow card) 90+1'; Tieber (yellow card) 98'	Summary	Sprangler (yellow card) 97'; Lovrić (yellow card) 105'	Stadium: Sportplatz Lafnitz; Attendance: 1,050; Referee: Alan Kijas

== Statistics ==
As of match played 28 May 2017

=== Appearances and goals ===
No.	Pos	Nat	Player	Total		Bundesliga		Austrian Cup	
No.	Pos	Nat	Player	Apps	Goals	Apps	Goals	Apps	Goals
2	DF	(Latvia) LAT	Vitālijs Maksimenko	20	0	17+1	0	2	0
4	DF	(Bosnia and Herzegovina) BIH	Nedeljko Malić	26	0	25	0	1	0
5	DF	(Spain) ESP	César Ortiz	12	0	12	0	0	0
6	DF	(Austria) AUT	Philipp Erhardt	25	1	24+1	1	0	0
7	MF	(Austria) AUT	Manuel Seidl	6	2	2+3	1	1	1
8	MF	(Austria) AUT	Alois Höller	34	3	32+1	3	0+1	0
9	FW	(Hungary) HUN	Barnabás Varga	11	1	5+6	1	0	0
10	MF	(Spain) ESP	Jano	37	2	34+1	2	2	0
11	FW	(Austria) AUT	Alexander Ibser	15	2	5+9	0	0+1	2
13	FW	(Austria) AUT	Florian Templ	20	3	9+9	2	1+1	1
15	MF	(Austria) AUT	Sven Sprangler	16	0	12+2	0	0+2	0
16	MF	(Bosnia and Herzegovina) BIH	Mario Grgić	17	2	6+9	1	2	1
17	MF	(Austria) AUT	Patrick Farkas	29	0	22+5	0	2	0
18	DF	(Austria) AUT	Lukas Rath	27	0	25+1	0	1	0
19	FW	(Austria) AUT	Stefan Maierhofer	14	2	11+3	2	0	0
20	MF	(Austria) AUT	Michael Perlak	23	4	18+5	4	0	0
21	GK	(Austria) AUT	Markus Kuster	32	0	30	0	2	0
22	GK	(Austria) AUT	Markus Böcskör	6	0	6	0	0	0
23	MF	(Austria) AUT	Julius Ertlthaler	11	0	2+7	0	2	0
25	DF	(Austria) AUT	Michael Novak	16	0	14+2	0	0	0
26	DF	(Spain) ESP	Fran Rodríguez	13	3	6+7	3	0	0
27	MF	(Austria) AUT	Thorsten Röcher	36	7	31+3	6	2	1
28	DF	(Austria) AUT	Francesco Lovrić	2	0	1	0	1	0
29	FW	(Ghana) GHA	David Atanga	15	3	15	3	0	0
31	DF	(Austria) AUT	Thorsten Mahrer	20	1	12+7	1	1	0
32	FW	(Austria) AUT	Markus Pink	15	1	3+11	1	1	0
33	FW	(Austria) AUT	Patrick Bürger	33	9	17+14	8	1+1	1
Players away on loan :
Players who left SV Mattersburg during the season:

=== Goal scorers ===
Place	Position	Nation	Number	Name	Bundesliga	Austrian Cup	Total
1	FW	(Austria)	33	Patrick Bürger	8	1	9
2	MF	(Austria)	27	Thorsten Röcher	6	1	7
3	MF	(Austria)	20	Michael Perlak	4	0	4
4	DF	(Spain)	26	Fran Rodríguez	3	0	3
4	FW	(Ghana)	29	David Atanga	3	0	3
4	MF	(Austria)	8	Alois Höller	3	0	3
4	FW	(Austria)	13	Florian Templ	2	1	3
8	MF	(Spain)	10	Jano	2	0	2
8	FW	(Austria)	19	Stefan Maierhofer	2	0	2
8	MF	(Bosnia and Herzegovina)	16	Mario Grgić	1	1	2
8	MF	(Austria)	7	Manuel Seidl	1	1	2
8	FW	(Austria)	11	Alexander Ibser	0	2	2
13	FW	(Austria)	32	Markus Pink	1	0	1
13	DF	(Austria)	31	Thorsten Mahrer	1	0	1
13	DF	(Austria)	6	Philipp Erhardt	1	0	1
13	FW	(Hungary)	9	Barnabás Varga	1	0	1
				TOTALS	39	7	46

=== Disciplinary record ===
Number	Nation	Position	Name	Bundesliga		Austrian Cup		Total	
Number	Nation	Position	Name	Yellow card	Red card	Yellow card	Red card	Yellow card	Red card
2	(Latvia)	DF	Vitālijs Maksimenko	2	0	0	0	2	0
4	(Bosnia and Herzegovina)	DF	Nedeljko Malić	8	0	0	0	8	0
5	(Spain)	DF	César Ortiz	2	0	0	0	2	0
6	(Austria)	DF	Philipp Erhardt	4	0	0	0	4	0
7	(Austria)	MF	Manuel Seidl	1	0	0	0	1	0
8	(Austria)	MF	Alois Höller	13	0	0	0	13	0
9	(Hungary)	FW	Barnabás Varga	1	0	0	0	1	0
10	(Spain)	MF	Jano	6	0	0	0	6	0
11	(Austria)	FW	Alexander Ibser	1	0	0	0	1	0
13	(Austria)	FW	Florian Templ	2	0	0	0	2	0
15	(Austria)	MF	Sven Sprangler	7	1	1	0	8	1
16	(Bosnia and Herzegovina)	MF	Mario Grgić	1	0	0	0	1	0
17	(Austria)	MF	Patrick Farkas	2	0	0	0	2	0
18	(Austria)	DF	Lukas Rath	5	0	0	0	5	0
19	(Austria)	FW	Stefan Maierhofer	5	0	0	0	5	0
20	(Austria)	MF	Michael Perlak	3	0	0	0	3	0
25	(Austria)	DF	Michael Novak	2	0	0	0	2	0
26	(Spain)	DF	Fran Rodríguez	2	0	0	0	2	0
27	(Austria)	MF	Thorsten Röcher	5	0	0	0	5	0
28	(Austria)	DF	Francesco Lovrić	0	0	1	0	1	0
29	(Ghana)	FW	David Atanga	2	0	0	0	2	0
31	(Austria)	DF	Thorsten Mahrer	1	0	0	0	1	0
33	(Austria)	FW	Patrick Bürger	7	0	0	0	7	0
			TOTALS	82	1	2	0	84	1
