= 2017–18 SK Sturm Graz season =

Sturm Graz
- Full name: Sportklub Puntigamer Sturm Graz
- Nicknames: Die Schwoazn, The Blackies
- Founded: 1909; 117 years ago
- Ground: UPC-Arena
- Capacity: 15,400
- Chairman: Christian Jauk
- Manager: Franco Foda
- League: Austrian Bundesliga
- Website: http://www.sksturm.at
Home colours	Away colours

Strum Graz is an Austrian football club based in Graz. During the 2017–18 campaign Strum Graz were competing in the following competitions: Bundesliga, Austrian Cup, UEFA Europa League.

== Club Friendlies ==
14 June 2017	Bruck	2–3	Sturm Graz
18:30		Report

17 June 2017	Sturm Graz	15–1	Holzhacker
11:00		Report

21 June 2017	Sturm Graz	3–4	Vasas
19:00		Report

24 June 2017	Sturm Graz	2–1	CSKA Moscow
18:00		Report

30 June 2017	Austria Wien	3–1	Sturm Graz
19:00		Report

2 July 2017	Sturm Graz	1–1	København
17:00		Report

6 July 2017	Sturm Graz	1–2	Mladá Boleslav
18:00		Report

== Competitions ==
=== Bundesliga ===
==== League table ====
Pos	Team	Pld	W	D	L	GF	GA	GD	Pts	Qualification or relegation
1	Red Bull Salzburg (C)	36	25	8	3	81	29	+52	83	Qualification for the Champions League third qualifying round
2	Sturm Graz	36	22	4	10	68	45	+23	70	Qualification for the Champions League second qualifying round
3	Rapid Wien	36	17	11	8	68	43	+25	62	Qualification for the Europa League third qualifying round (Note: Sturm Graz qualified for the Europa League third qualifying round by winning the 2017–18 Austrian Cup. However, since they already qualified for European competition based on their league position, the spot awarded to the cup winners was passed down the league.)
4	LASK	36	17	6	13	49	41	+8	57	Qualification for the Europa League second qualifying round
5	Admira Wacker Mödling	36	15	6	15	59	66	−7	51	Qualification for the Europa League second qualifying round

Source: weltfussball.de (in German)
Rules for classification: 1) Points; 2) Goal difference; 3) Goals scored; 4) Matches won; 5) Away matches won; 6) Head-to-head points; 7) Head-to-head goal difference; 8) Head-to-head goals scored.
(C) Champions

==== Results summary ====
Overall								Home						Away					
Pld	W	D	L	GF	GA	GD	Pts	W	D	L	GF	GA	GD	W	D	L	GF	GA	GD
10	7	1	2	19	12	+7	22	3	1	0	6	3	+3	4	0	2	13	9	+4

Last updated: 30 September 2017.

==== Results by matchday ====
Matchday	1	2	3	4	5	6	7	8	9	10	11	12	13	14	15	16	17	18	19	20	21	22	23	24	25	26	27	28	29	30	31	32	33	34	35	36
Ground	H	A	A	H	A	H	A	A	H	A	H	H	A	H	A	H	H	A	H	A	A	H	A	H	A	A	H	A	H	A	H	A	H	H	H	A
Result	W	W	W	W	W	W	L	L	D	W																										
Position	1	1	1	1	1	1	1	1	1	1																										

Updated to match(es) played on 30 September 2017. Source:
A = Away; H = Home; W = Win; D = Draw; L = Loss

=== Matches ===
23 July 2017 Match 1	Sturm Graz	3–2	St. Pölten	Graz
19:00	Zulechner 16'; Hierländer (yellow card) 38' (goal) 60'; Žulj 90+2' (pen.)	Report	Thürauer 2' 12'; Stec (yellow card) 34'; Diallo (yellow card) 71'	Stadium: Merkur-Arena; Attendance: 7,281; Referee: (Austria) Christopher Jäger

30 July 2017 Match 2	Austria Wien	2–3	Sturm Graz	Vienna
16:00	Filipović (yellow card) 45+1'; Salamon (yellow card) 71'; Žulj 82' (o.g.); Westermann (yellow card) 83'; Grünwald (yellow card) 84'; Holzhauser 88' (pen.)	Report	Huspek 33'; Koch (yellow card) 42'; Žulj 56' (yellow card) 81'; Alar (yellow card) 66'; Schmid 86'; Hierländer (yellow card) 90+1'	Stadium: Ernst-Happel-Stadion; Attendance: 6,975; Referee: (Austria) Markus Hameter

6 August 2017 Match 3	Mattersburg	2–3	Sturm Graz	Mattersburg
19:00	Pink 10'; Erhardt (yellow card) 13'; Maierhofer (yellow card) 21' (goal) 90+1' (pen.); Jano (yellow card) 23'; Prevljak (yellow card) 90+1'	Report	Lykogiannis 17'; Hierländer (yellow card) 35'; Huspek 51'; Lovrić (yellow card) 58'; Röcher (yellow card) 59' (goal) 69'	Stadium: Pappelstadion; Attendance: 3,826; Referee: (Austria) Harald Lechner

12 August 2017 Match 4	Sturm Graz	2–1	Wolfsberger AC	Graz
18:30	Alar 30'; Hierländer 57'	Report	Palla (yellow card) 5'; Gschweidl 81'; Orgill (yellow card) 90+3'	Stadium: Merkur-Arena; Attendance: 9,478; Referee: (Austria) Sebastian Gishamer

19 August 2017 Match 5	Rapid Wien	1–2	Sturm Graz	Vienna
16:00	Schaub (yellow card) 31'; Auer 60'; Hofmann (yellow card) 90+5'	Report	Alar 17'; Röcher 53'; Potzmann (yellow card) 59'; Lykogiannis (yellow card) 67'; Hierländer (yellow card) 86'	Stadium: Allianz Stadion; Attendance: 20,205; Referee: (Austria) Manuel Schüttengruber

27 August 2017 Match 6	Sturm Graz	1–0	Red Bull Salzburg	Graz
16:30	Lykogiannis (yellow card) 14'; Žulj (yellow card) 33'; Alar 52'; Hierländer (yellow card) 86'	Report	Wolf (yellow card) 40'; Pongračić (yellow card) 77'; Haidara (yellow card) 89'; Ćaleta-Car (yellow card) 90+1'	Stadium: Merkur-Arena; Attendance: 15,124; Referee: (Austria) Robert Schörgenhofer

9 September 2017 Match 7	LASK Linz	2–1	Sturm Graz	Pasching
16:00	Erdoğan 10'; Ullmann 34'	Report	Alar 25' (pen.); Lovrić (yellow card) 37'	Stadium: TGW Arena; Attendance: 5,760; Referee: (Austria) Harald Lechner

16 September 2017 Match 8	Admira	2–1	Sturm Graz	Maria Enzersdorf
18:30	Knasmüllner (yellow card) 75' (goal) 85' (pen.) 90+3'	Report	Alar 30'; Hierländer (yellow card) 35'; Jeggo (yellow card) 87'	Stadium: BSFZ-Arena; Attendance: 2,690; Referee: (Austria) Gerhard Grobelnik

23 September 2017 Match 9	Sturm Graz	0–0	SCR Altach	Graz
18:30	Koch (yellow card) 15'; Röcher (yellow card) 24'; Lovrić (yellow card) 31' (yellow-red card); Zulechner (yellow card) 89'	Report	Lienhart (yellow card) 41'; Salomon (yellow card) 62'; Dobras (yellow card) 84'	Stadium: Merkur-Arena; Attendance: 9,312; Referee: (Austria) Manuel Schüttengruber

30 September 2017 Match 10	St. Pölten	0–3	Sturm Graz	Sankt Pölten
16:00	Mehmedovic (yellow card) 54'; Ambichl (yellow card) 77'	Report	Stec 10' (o.g.); Alar 18'; Lykogiannis (yellow card) 57'; Huspek 63'	Stadium: NV Arena; Attendance: 3,463; Referee: (Austria) Oliver Drachta

15 October 2017 Match 11	Sturm Graz	v	Austria Wien	Graz
16:30				Stadium: Merkur-Arena

=== Austrian Cup ===
16 July 2017 Round 1	FC Hard	0–3	Sturm Graz	Hard
15:30	Semih Yasar (red card) 32'; Metin Batir (yellow card) 55'	Report	Schubert 74' 90+5'; Alar 90+1'	Stadium: Waldstadion Hard; Attendance: 1,800; Referee: (Austria) Sebastian Gishamer

20 September 2017 Round 2	FC Liefering	1–2	Sturm Graz	Grödig
18:00	Marinko Sorda 19'	Report	Lovrić (yellow card) 31'; Jeggo (yellow card) 73'; Zulechner 78' 90+4'	Stadium: Untersberg-Arena; Attendance: 1,123; Referee: (Austria) Walter Altmann

25 October 2017 Last 16	Sturm Graz	v	SCR Altach	Graz
18:00				Stadium: Merkur-Arena

=== UEFA Europa League ===
13 July 2017 2nd Qualifying First Leg	(Austria) Sturm Graz	0–1	(Montenegro) Mladost Podgorica	Graz
20:30	Schulz (yellow card) 2'; Maresic (yellow card) 34'	Report	Krkotić 2' (pen.) (yellow card) 3'; Andrija Kaluđerović (yellow card) 34' (yellow-red card)	Stadium: Merkur-Arena; Attendance: 7,109; Referee: (Finland) Mattias Gestranius

20 July 2017 2nd Qualifying Second Leg	(Montenegro) Mladost Podgorica	0–3 (1–3 agg.)	(Austria) Sturm Graz	Podgorica
20:30	Vukčević (yellow card) 75'; Bukorac (yellow card) 82'	Report	Röcher 34'; Zulechner 39'; Alar 46'	Stadium: Podgorica City Stadium; Attendance: 5,500; Referee: (Bulgaria) Nikola Popov

27 July 2017 3rd Qualifying First Leg	(Austria) Sturm Graz	1–2	(Turkey) Fenerbahçe	Graz
19:00	Lykogiannis (yellow card) 5'; Hierländer 10' (yellow card) 71'; Lovrić (yellow card) 41'	Report	Tufan (yellow card) 13'; Maresic 29' (o.g.); Neustädter 35'	Stadium: Merkur-Arena; Attendance: 15,323; Referee: (Norway) Ola Hobber Nilsen

3 August 2017 3rd Qualifying Second Leg	(Turkey) Fenerbahçe	1–1 (3–2 agg.)	(Austria) Sturm Graz	Istanbul
19:30	Dirar 32'; Neustädter (yellow card) 66'; Potuk (yellow card) 75'	Report	Jeggo (yellow card) 23'; Huspek 66'; Maresic (yellow card) 75'	Stadium: Ülker Stadium; Attendance: 37,701; Referee: (England) Bobby Madley
