= Prskalo =

Prskalo is a surname. Notable people with the surname include:

- Andrej Prskalo (born 1987), Croatian footballer
- Danijel Prskalo (born 1990), Croatian footballer
- Draženko Prskalo (born 1964), Croatian football manager and player
- Ivan Prskalo (born 1995), Bosnian footballer
- Ivo Prskalo (1948–2010), Yugoslav-Australian soccer player
- Matija Prskalo (born 1966), Croatian actress
- Mladen Prskalo (born 1968), Croatian handball coach and former player
