= Patrick Farkas =

Austrian footballer

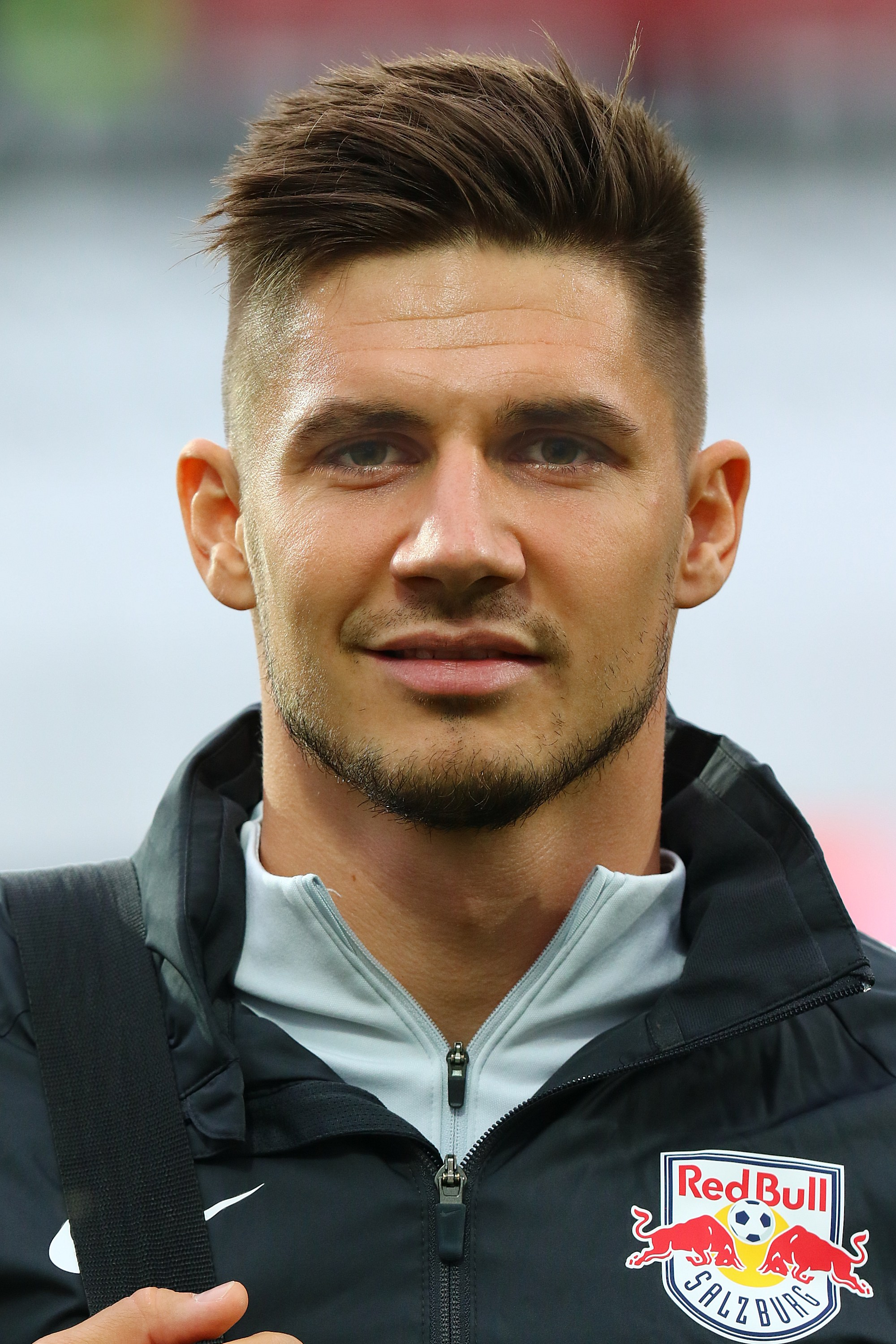
- Farkas with Red Bull Salzburg in 2018

Personal information
- Date of birth: 9 September 1992 (age 34)
- Place of birth: Oberwart, Austria
- Height: 1.79 m (5 ft 10 in)
- Position: Fullback

Team information
- Current team: SV Oberwart
- Number: 23

Youth career
- 2001–2004: ASK Oberdorf
- 2004–2006: SV Oberwart
- 2006–2009: AKA Burgenland

Senior career*
| Years | Team | Apps | (Gls) |
| 2009–2017 | SV Mattersburg | 238 | (9) |
| 2017–2021 | Red Bull Salzburg | 48 | (1) |
| 2021–2022 | Luzern | 7 | (0) |
| 2022–2023 | TSV Hartberg | 30 | (0) |
| 2023– | SV Oberwart | 16 | (1) |

International career
| 2007 | Austria U16 | 1 | (0) |
| 2008–2009 | Austria U17 | 14 | (0) |
| 2009 | Austria U18 | 1 | (0) |
| 2010 | Austria U19 | 7 | (0) |
| 2011 | Austria U20 | 3 | (0) |
| 2010–2014 | Austria U21 | 24 | (0) |
- * Club domestic league appearances and goals as of 10 November 2023

Patrick Farkas (born 9 September 1992) is an Austrian professional footballer who plays for Austrian Regionalliga club SV Oberwart.

== Club career ==
=== FC Red Bull Salzburg ===
After spending the entirety of his career with SV Mattersburg since his debut in 2009, Farkas joined Austrian giants Red Bull Salzburg in the summer of 2017 and signed a three-year contract.

In his first year at the club, Farkas made 16 league appearances and scored one goal as Salzburg won their fifth Austrian Football Bundesliga title in a row.

Following a lengthy time on the sidelines with a cruciate ligament injury, Farkas returned to the squad for the final of the 2018–19 Austrian Cup on 1 May 2019. He scored the opening goal before Mu'nas Dabbur headed in minutes later to make it 2–0. Farkas was dismissed early in the second half for a second yellow card, but Salzburg held on for the win and lifted the trophy to secure a domestic double.

==== 2019–20 season ====
On 19 July 2019, Farkas made his season debut in a match against Parndorf in the first round of the 2019–20 Austrian Cup; he scored two goals as Salzburg ran out 7–1 winners over the fourth division side.

Farkas made his debut appearance in the UEFA Champions League proper with a substitute appearance against Genk on 17 September; a match that Salzburg won 6–2.

On 23 December, it was reported that Farkas had suffered a stroke in training on 21 October. In a video posted to the club's social media channels, Farkas said that he collapsed due to a hole in his heart caused the stroke when a blood clot shot to his brain. He did not require surgery to close the hole and returned to training in late December with the goal of re-joining Salzburg's match-day squads by early 2020.

=== Hartberg ===
In January 2022, Farkas returned to Austria after 6 months in Switzerland and signed with TSV Hartberg until June 2024.

== Career statistics ==
As of 31 August 2022

Appearances and goals by club, season and competition
| Club | Season | League | | | National Cup | | Europe | | Other | | Total | |
| Club | Season | Division | Apps | Goals | Apps | Goals | Apps | Goals | Apps | Goals | Apps | Goals |
|---|---|---|---|---|---|---|---|---|---|---|---|---|
| SV Mattersburg | 2009–10 | Austrian Bundesliga | 16 | 0 | 0 | 0 | — | | — | | 16 | 0 |
| SV Mattersburg | 2010–11 | Austrian Bundesliga | 30 | 0 | 3 | 0 | — | | — | | 33 | 0 |
| SV Mattersburg | 2011–12 | Austrian Bundesliga | 34 | 2 | 1 | 0 | — | | — | | 35 | 2 |
| SV Mattersburg | 2012–13 | Austrian Bundesliga | 35 | 0 | 3 | 0 | — | | — | | 38 | 0 |
| SV Mattersburg | 2013–14 | Erste Liga | 32 | 2 | 2 | 0 | — | | — | | 34 | 2 |
| SV Mattersburg | 2014–15 | Erste Liga | 32 | 2 | 2 | 0 | — | | — | | 34 | 2 |
| SV Mattersburg | 2015–16 | Austrian Bundesliga | 32 | 3 | 4 | 0 | — | | — | | 36 | 3 |
| SV Mattersburg | 2016–17 | Austrian Bundesliga | 27 | 0 | 2 | 0 | — | | — | | 29 | 0 |
| SV Mattersburg | Total | | 238 | 9 | 17 | 0 | — | | — | | 255 | 9 |
| Red Bull Salzburg | 2017–18 | Austrian Bundesliga | 16 | 1 | 5 | 1 | 1 | 0 | — | | 22 | 2 |
| Red Bull Salzburg | 2018–19 | Austrian Bundesliga | 3 | 0 | 1 | 1 | 0 | 0 | — | | 4 | 1 |
| Red Bull Salzburg | 2019–20 | Austrian Bundesliga | 18 | 0 | 3 | 2 | 2 | 0 | — | | 23 | 2 |
| Red Bull Salzburg | 2020–21 | Austrian Bundesliga | 11 | 0 | 1 | 0 | 0 | 0 | — | | 12 | 0 |
| Red Bull Salzburg | Total | | 48 | 1 | 10 | 4 | 3 | 0 | — | | 61 | 5 |
| FC Luzern | 2021–22 | Super League | 7 | 0 | 2 | 0 | 1 | 0 | — | | 10 | 0 |
| TSV Hartberg | 2021–22 | Austrian Bundesliga | 13 | 0 | 2 | 0 | — | | — | | 15 | 0 |
| Career total | | | 306 | 10 | 31 | 4 | 4 | 0 | — | | 341 | 14 |

== Honours ==
Red Bull Salzburg

- Austrian Football Bundesliga: 2017–18, 2018–19, 2019–20, 2020–21
- Austrian Cup: 2018–19, 2019–20, 2020–21
