= Perlak =

Perlak may refer to:

- Perlak, Aceh, a town in Indonesia
- Peureulak Sultanate, the historical Islamic kingdom
- Prelog, Croatia, a town
- Michael Perlak (born 1985), Austrian footballer
