= Fran Rodríguez =

Spanish footballer (born 1990)

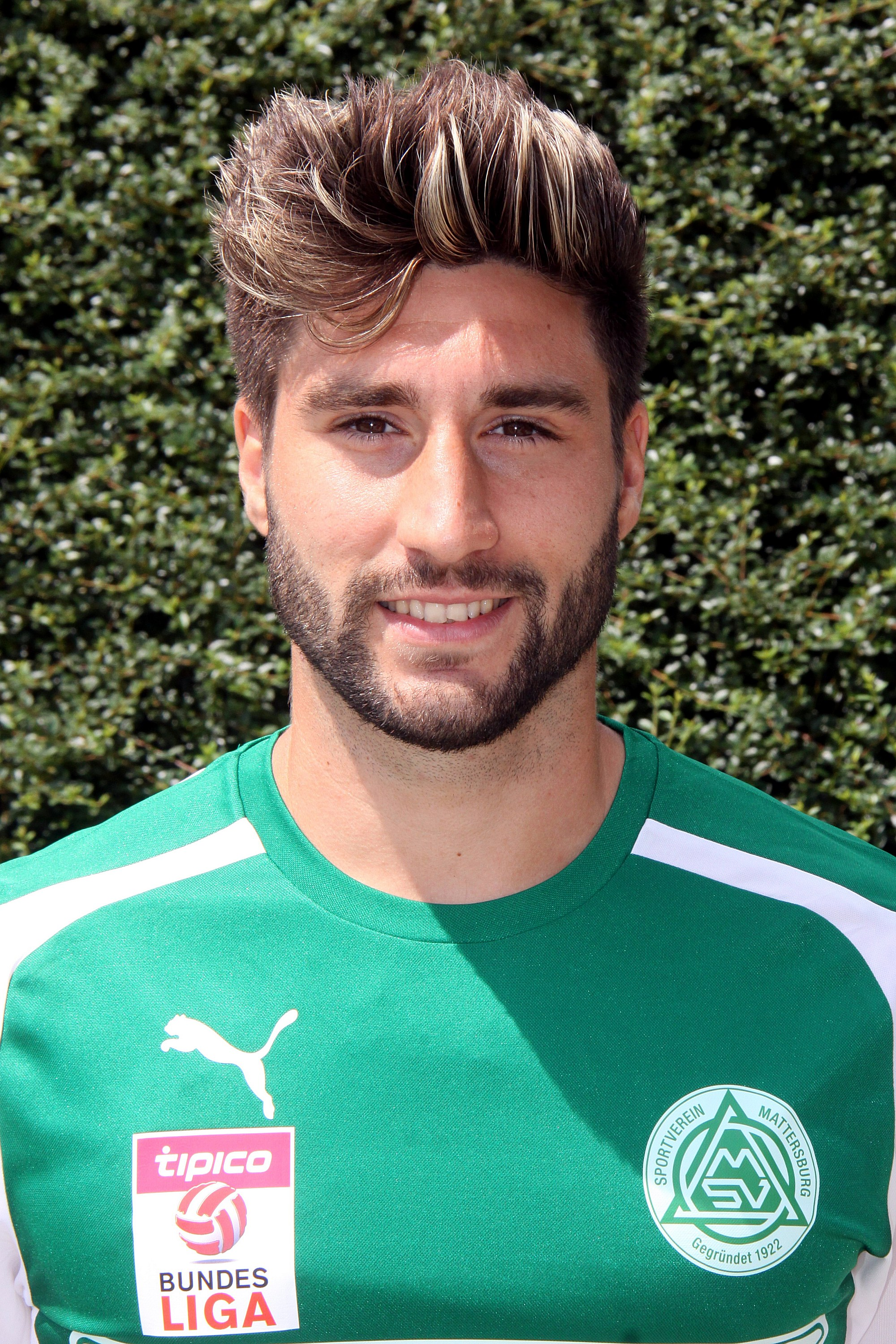
- Rodríguez as a Mattersburg player (2015)

Personal information
- Full name: Francisco José Sánchez Rodríguez
- Date of birth: 8 February 1990 (age 36)
- Place of birth: Alcalá de Henares, Spain
- Height: 1.77 m (5 ft 9 1/2 in)
- Position: Centre-back

Youth career
- Valleaguado
- Coslada
- Alcalá

Senior career*
Years	Team	Apps	(Gls)
2008–2011	Alcalá	20	(0)
2010–2011	Alcalá B	9	(0)
2011–2012	Atlético Madrid C	9	(0)
2011–2013	Atlético Madrid B	16	(0)
2013–2014	Torrejón	13	(0)
2014–2019	Mattersburg	39	(3)
2020	Alcobendas Sport	6	(0)
2020–2021	Torrejón	25	(2)
2021–2022	Ursaria	26	(2)
2022–2023	Unión Adarve	8	(0)
2023	Torrejón	10	(0)
2023–2025	Moscardó	33	(2)
- * Club domestic league appearances and goals as of 4 May 2025

Francisco José "Fran" Sánchez Rodríguez (born 8 February 1990) is a Spanish professional footballer who plays as a central defender.

== Club career ==
Born in Alcalá de Henares, Community of Madrid, Rodríguez played only lower league football in his country, notably representing Atlético Madrid's reserves in the Segunda División B. Late into the 2014 January transfer window he joined Austrian Football First League club SV Mattersburg, contributing five games in his first full season to help it return to the Bundesliga after two years.

Rodríguez made his debut in top-flight football on 15 August 2015, being sent off early into an eventual 5–1 away loss against FK Austria Wien. He scored his first goal for the team on 22 October 2016, helping to a 2–2 draw at SK Sturm Graz by netting in the 95th minute.
