= Peter Hawlik =

Austrian footballer

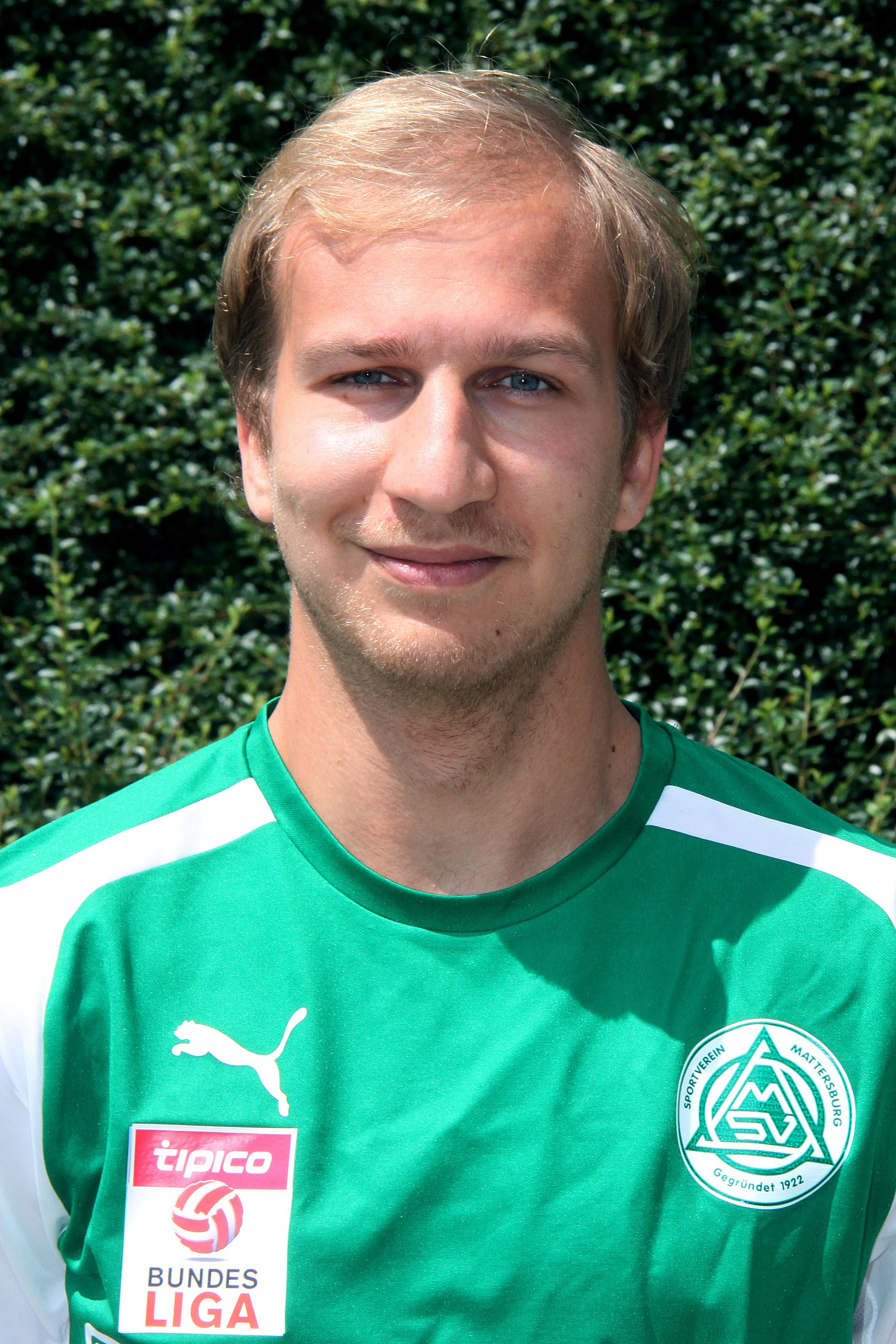

Personal information
- Date of birth: 13 August 1991 (age 35)
- Place of birth: Wiener Neustadt, Austria
- Height: 1.71 m (5 ft 7 1/2 in)
- Position: Midfielder

Team information
- Current team: SV Mattersburg II
- Number: 3

Senior career*
Years	Team	Apps	(Gls)
2008–	SV Mattersburg II	186	(9)
2011–	SV Mattersburg	2	(0)
- * Club domestic league appearances and goals as of 4 February 2017

Peter Hawlik (born 13 August 1991) is an Austrian footballer currently playing for SV Mattersburg II.
