= Francesco Lovrić =

Austrian footballer

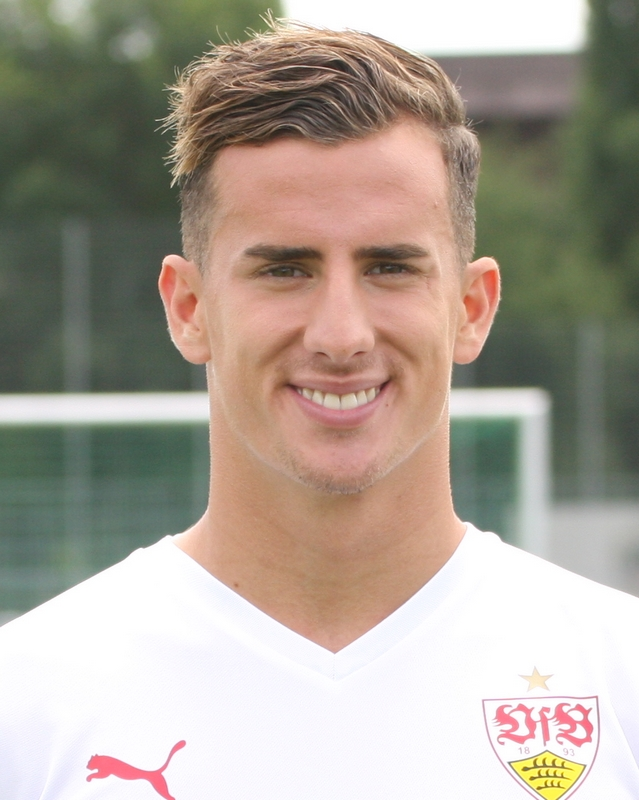

Personal information
- Full name: Francesco Lovrić
- Date of birth: 5 October 1995 (age 31)
- Place of birth: Vienna, Austria
- Height: 1.84 m (6 ft 0 in)
- Position: Centre-back

Team information
- Current team: SV Leobendorf
- Number: 6

Youth career
- –2011: Austria Wien
- 2011–2014: VfB Stuttgart

Senior career*
Years	Team	Apps	(Gls)
2013–2016	VfB Stuttgart II	38	(1)
2016	SV Mattersburg	1	(0)
2016–2017	SV Mattersburg II	18	(3)
2017–2018	Austria Lustenau	10	(0)
2018–2020	Kickers Offenbach	55	(5)
2020-2021	Karaiskakis	22	(4)
2021–2022	Eschen-Mauren	16	(2)
2022–2025	FC Marchfeld	75	(4)
2025–	SV Leobendorf	2	(0)

International career
2010–2011	Austria U16	4	(0)
2011	Austria U17	6	(1)
2012–2013	Austria U18	5	(0)
2013–2014	Austria U19	10	(0)
2015	Austria U20	5	(0)
- * Club domestic league appearances and goals as of 28 June 2026

Francesco Lovrić (born 5 October 1995) is an Austrian professional footballer currently playing for SV Leobendorf.

== Club career ==
Lovrić joined VfB Stuttgart in 2011 from Austria Wien. He made his debut on 15 February 2014 for VfB Stuttgart II in the 3. Liga against Hallescher FC in a 3–2 away defeat. He played the full game as a center back.

== International career ==
Lovrić played for Austria at under-16, under-17, under-18 and under-19 level.
