= Nedeljko Malić =

Bosnian-Herzegovinian footballer

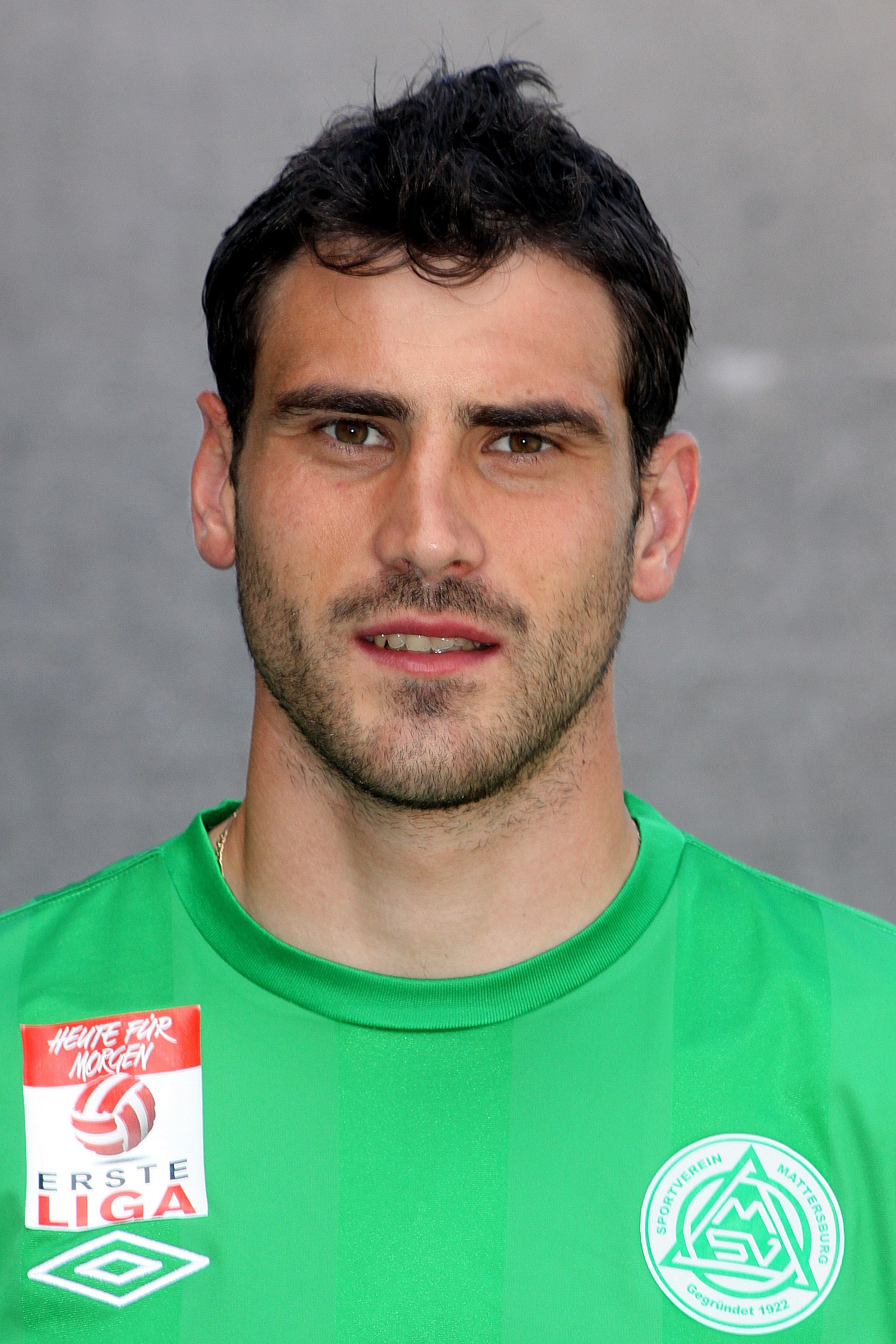
- Malić in 2013

Personal information
- Full name: Nedeljko Malić
- Date of birth: 15 May 1988 (age 38)
- Place of birth: Banja Luka, SFR Yugoslavia
- Height: 1.92 m (6 ft 3 1/2 in)
- Position: Defender

Youth career
- 2000–2005: BSK Banja Luka

Senior career*
Years	Team	Apps	(Gls)
2005–2020	Mattersburg	303	(21)
2012–2015	Mattersburg II	3	(0)
2021	Indy Eleven	3	(0)

International career^{‡}
2008–2009	Bosnia and Herzegovina U21	10	(0)
- * Club domestic league appearances and goals as of 17 September 2021 ‡ National team caps and goals as of 2 August 2015

Nedeljko Malić (Serbian Cyrillic: Недељко Малић; born 15 May 1988) is a Bosnian-Herzegovinian association football player. He plays as a defender and has won two caps for the Bosnia and Herzegovina national under-21 football team.
