= Jano (footballer, born 1986) =

Spanish footballer

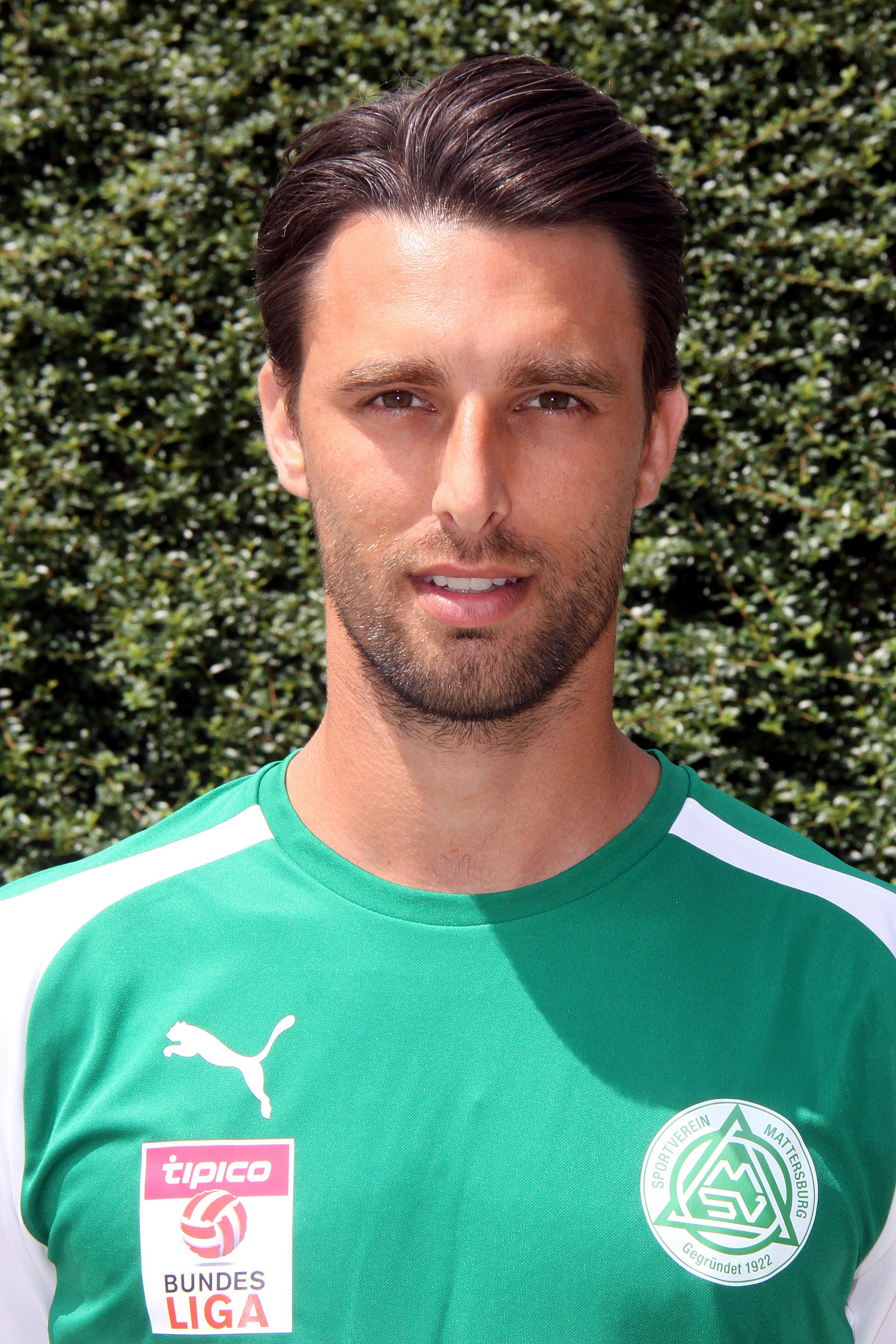
- Jano with Mattersburg in 2015

Personal information
- Full name: Alejandro Velasco Fariñas
- Date of birth: 23 December 1986 (age 39)
- Place of birth: Madrid, Spain
- Height: 1.87 m (6 ft 1 1/2 in)
- Position: Defensive midfielder

Youth career
- Colegio San Agustín
- Rayo Majadahonda

Senior career*
Years	Team	Apps	(Gls)
2006–2008	Rayo Majadahonda		
2008–2009	Leganés	14	(0)
2009–2011	Rayo Vallecano B	58	(3)
2011	Puerta Bonita	16	(0)
2012–2014	St. Pölten	84	(12)
2014–2020	Mattersburg	198	(12)
2020–2022	Fuenlabrada	18	(0)
Total		388	(27)
- * Club domestic league appearances and goals

Alejandro Velasco Fariñas (born 23 December 1986), known as Jano, is a Spanish former professional footballer who played as a defensive midfielder.

== Club career ==
=== Early years ===
Born in Madrid, Jano was a CF Rayo Majadahonda youth graduate, and made his first-team debut during the 2006–07 season, in the Tercera División. In 2008 he signed with Segunda División B club CD Leganés, terminating his contract on 4 September 2009 and joining Rayo Vallecano's reserves in the fourth division.

Jano helped Rayo B in their promotion to the third level in 2010, but was sparingly used afterwards. He subsequently moved to amateurs CD Puerta Bonita, leaving in January 2012 for Austrian Football Second League side SKN St. Pölten.

=== Austria ===
Jano made his professional debut on 2 March 2012, starting and scoring his team's second goal in a 3–2 home win over FC Lustenau 07. A regular starter, he netted the equaliser in the 2013–14 Austrian Cup final against FC Red Bull Salzburg, but in an eventual 4–2 loss.

In the summer of 2014, Jano signed for SV Mattersburg in the same country and league. He helped to promotion to the Bundesliga in his first season, as champions.

Jano made his debut in the Austrian top flight on 25 July 2015, starting in the 2–1 home defeat of Salzburg. He scored his first goal in the competition on 26 September, his team's second in a 4–2 away loss to the same opposition.

In August 2020, shortly after renewing his contract for a further two years, Jano became a free agent after Mattersburg's main financial backer was closed down and the club was subsequently dissolved.

=== Later career ===
Jano returned to Spain on 5 October 2020, agreeing to a one-year deal with CF Fuenlabrada. He played his first Segunda División match on 8 November at the age of 33 years and 11 months, as a 64th-minute substitute in the 3–0 victory at AD Alcorcón.

== Honours ==
Mattersburg

- Austrian Football First League: 2014–15
