= Alexander Ibser =

Austrian footballer

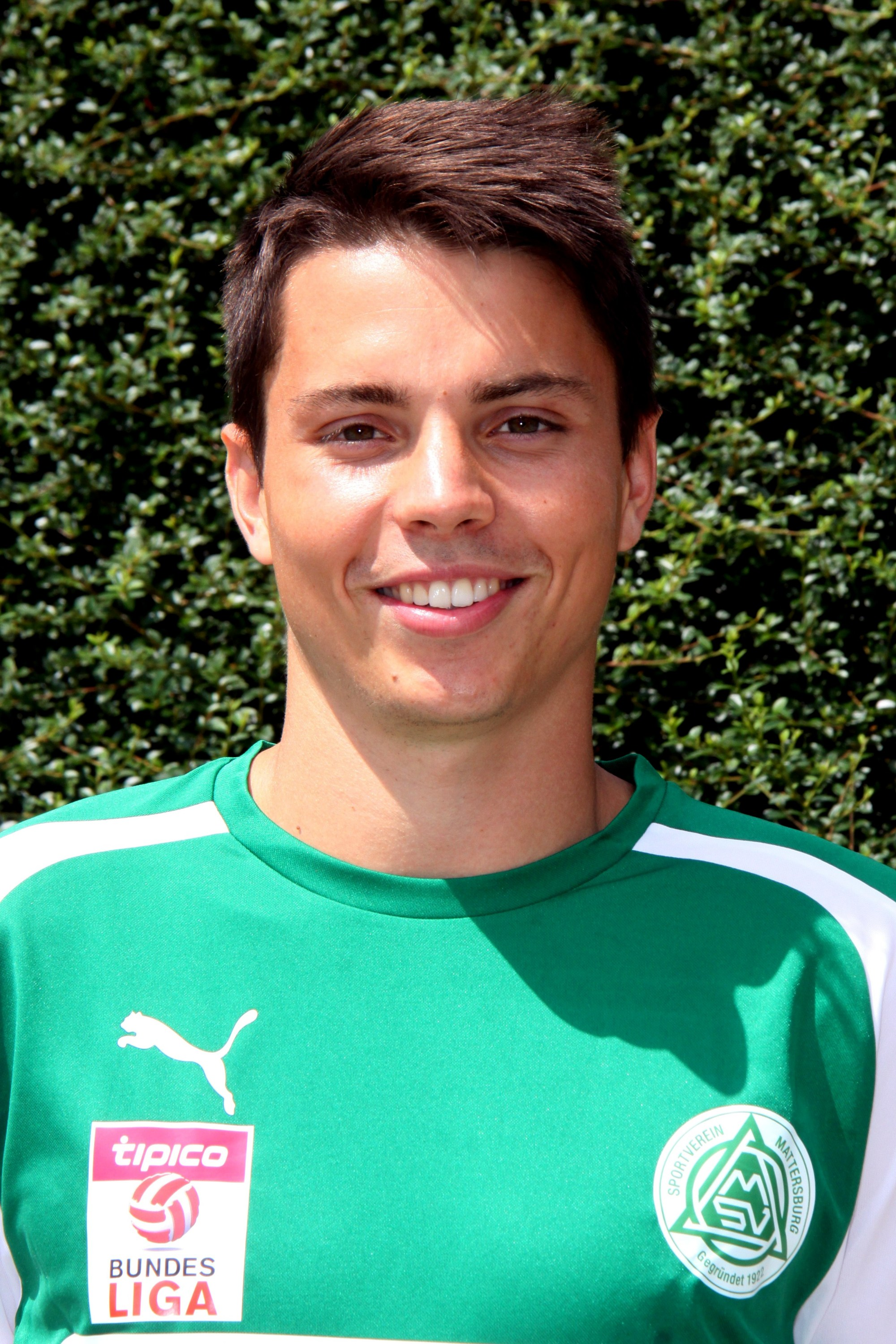

Personal information
- Full name: Alexander Ibser
- Date of birth: 31 January 1991 (age 35)
- Place of birth: Baden bei Wien, Austria
- Position: Forward

Team information
- Current team: Union Dietach II (Manager)

Youth career
- 1997–2004: ASK Ebreichsdorf
- 2004–2009: Admira Wacker

Senior career*
Years	Team	Apps	(Gls)
2009–2011	ASK Baumgarten	50	(12)
2011–2013	SV Mattersburg II	42	(15)
2013–2017	SV Mattersburg	78	(10)
2017–2018	ASK Ebreichsdorf	17	(4)
2019	SV Rohrbach	14	(5)

Managerial career
- 2017–2018: ASK Ebreichsdorf (U10 assistant)
- 2020: Unterwaltersdorf ASV (youth coach)
- 2021–2022: Union Dietach (U10 manager)
- 2022–: Union Dietach II
- * Club domestic league appearances and goals

Alexander Ibser (born 31 January 1991) is an Austrian retired footballer and current manager of Union Dietach's reserve team.
