= Markus Böcskör =

Austrian footballer

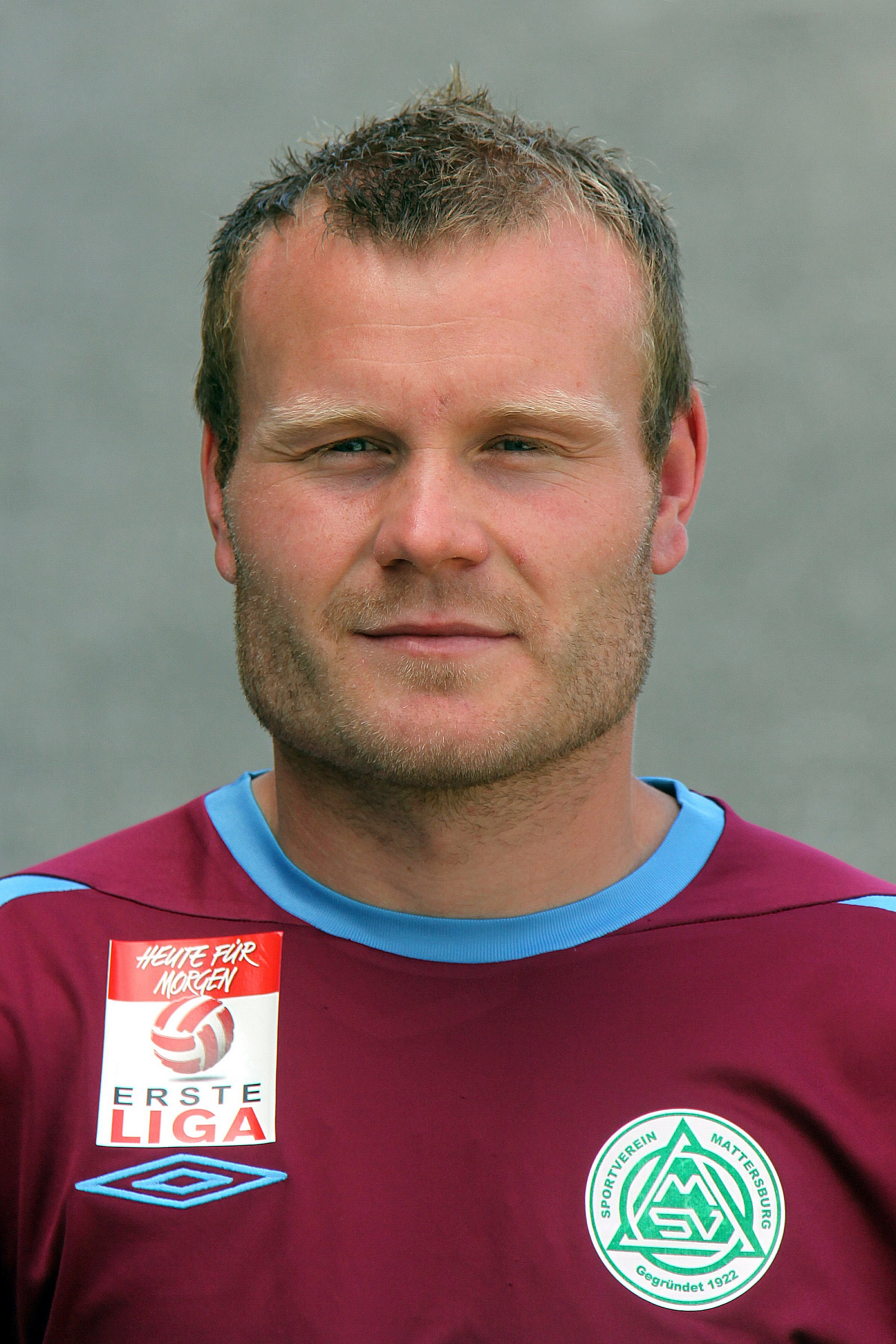

Personal information
- Full name: Markus Böcskör
- Date of birth: 1 October 1982 (age 44)
- Place of birth: Oberwart, Austria
- Height: 1.84 m (6 ft 0 in)
- Position: Goalkeeper

Team information
- Current team: SC Bad Sauerbrunn
- Number: 22

Senior career*
Years	Team	Apps	(Gls)
2002–2006	SV Mattersburg	33	(0)
2006–2007	Kapfenberger SV	28	(0)
2007–2008	Kaizer Chiefs	0	(0)
2008–2009	FK Austria Wien	0	(0)
2009–2011	Parndorf	40	(0)
2011–2018	SV Mattersburg	13	(0)
2018–	SC Bad Sauerbrunn	43	(0)
- * Club domestic league appearances and goals as of 19:04, 4 June 2020 (UTC)

Markus Böcskör (born 1 October 1982) is an Austrian footballer who plays as a goalkeeper for SC Bad Sauerbrunn in Landesliga Burgenland. Besides Austria, he has played in South Africa.
