= Alois Höller =

Austrian footballer

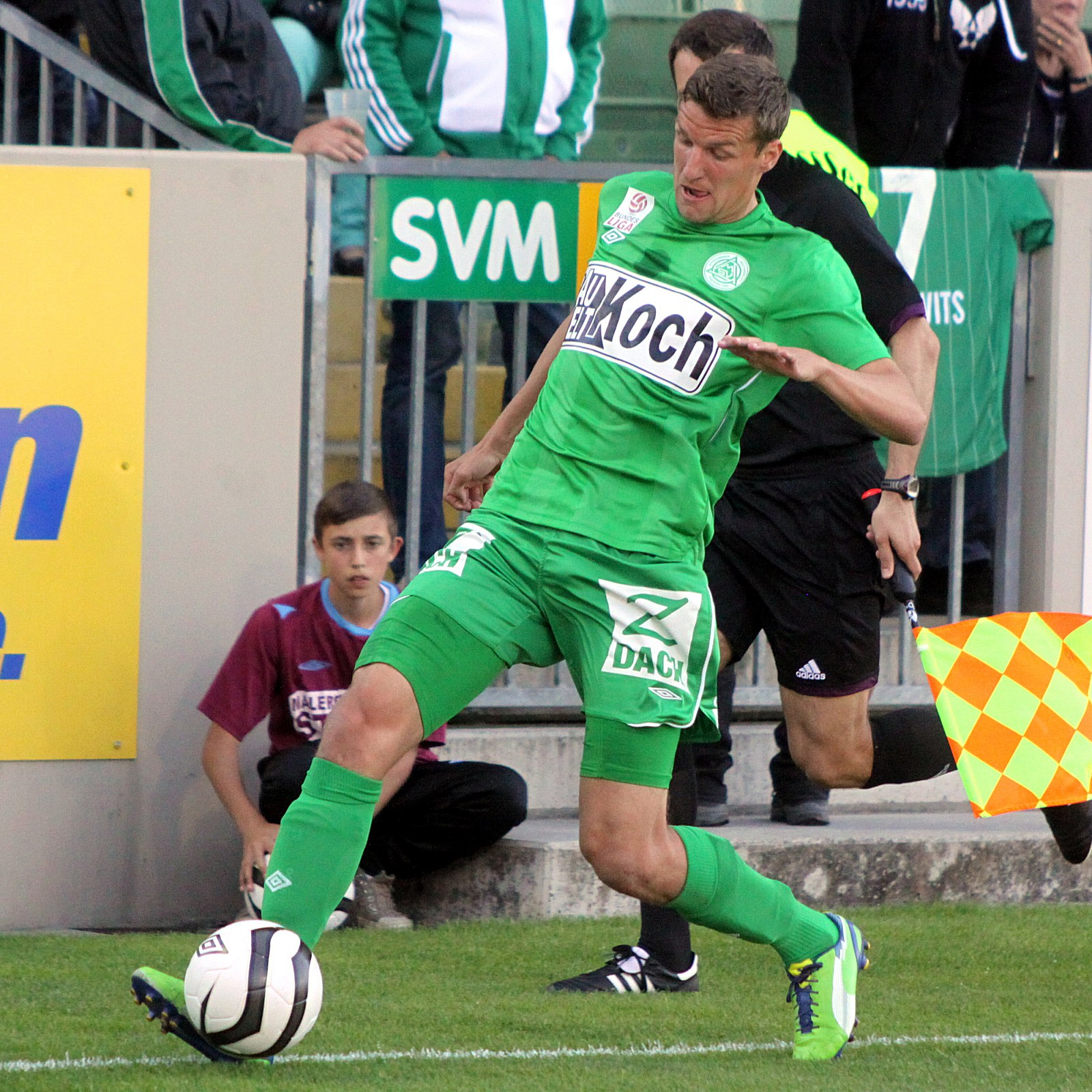
- Höller with SV Mattersburg in 2013

Personal information
- Date of birth: 15 March 1989 (age 37)
- Place of birth: Austria
- Height: 1.92 m (6 ft 4 in)
- Position: Midfielder

Team information
- Current team: SV Mattersburg
- Number: 8

Senior career*
Years	Team	Apps	(Gls)
2007–2008	SV Stegersbach	13	(7)
2008–	SV Mattersburg	304	(23)
- * Club domestic league appearances and goals as of 3 February 2017

Alois Höller (born 15 March 1989) is an Austrian footballer who plays for SV Mattersburg in the Austrian Bundesliga.
