= Lukas Rath =

Austrian footballer

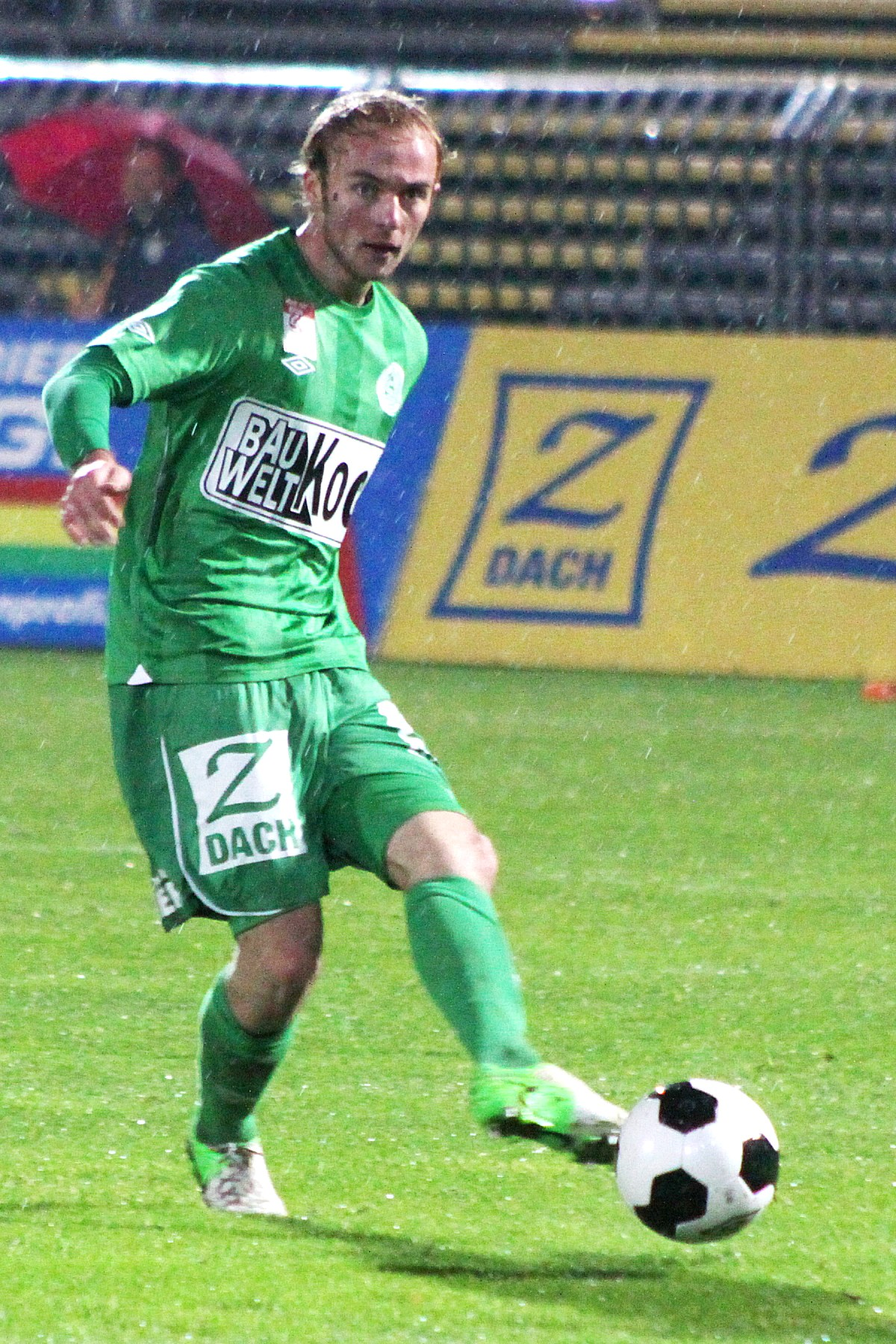

Personal information
- Date of birth: 18 January 1992 (age 34)
- Place of birth: Eisenstadt, Austria
- Height: 1.83 m (6 ft 0 in)
- Position: Defender

Team information
- Current team: Parndorf 1919
- Number: 20

Senior career*
Years	Team	Apps	(Gls)
2008–2020	Mattersburg	227	(2)
2020–2021	Admira Wacker	10	(0)
2022–2023	Blau-Weiß Linz	3	(0)
2024	ASV Draßburg	12	(0)
2024–	Parndorf 1919	42	(3)

International career^{‡}
2007	Austria under-16	1	(0)
2008–2009	Austria under-17	14	(2)
2009–2010	Austria under-19	10	(0)
2011	Austria under-20	3	(0)
2012	Austria under-21	5	(0)
- * Club domestic league appearances and goals as of 20 June 2026 ‡ National team caps and goals as of 10 September 2014

Lukas Rath (born 18 January 1992) is an Austrian association football player who plays as a defender for Austrian Regionalliga East side Parndorf 1919.

== Club career ==
On 22 September 2020, he signed with Admira Wacker.
