= Florian Templ =

Austrian footballer

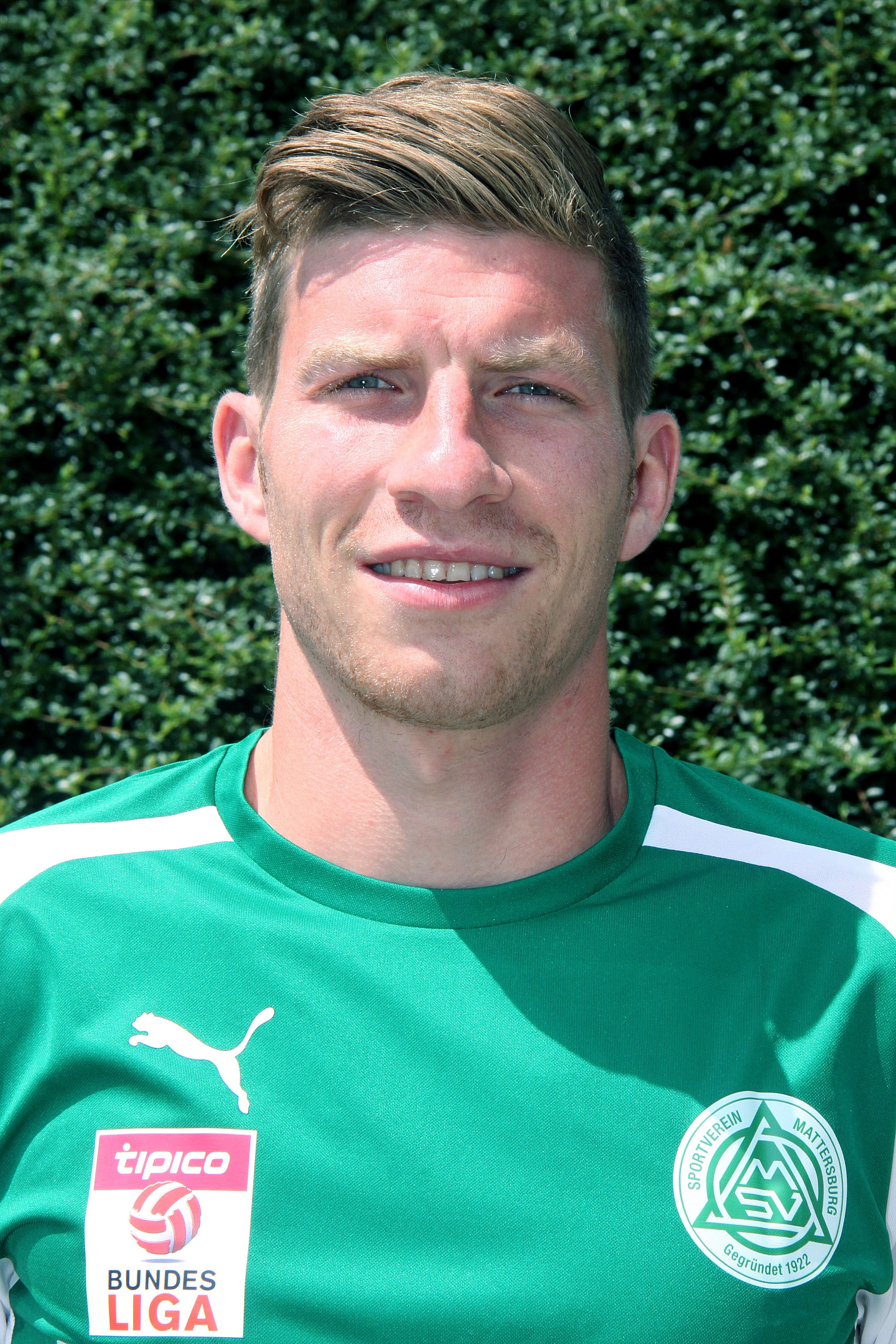

Personal information
- Full name: Florian Templ
- Date of birth: 1 October 1988 (age 38)
- Place of birth: Sankt Marien, Austria
- Position: Forward

Team information
- Current team: Union Weißkirchen
- Number: 9

Youth career
- 1996–2003: Union St. Marien
- 2003–2004: Union Neuhofen

Senior career*
Years	Team	Apps	(Gls)
2007	Union Neuhofen	2	(0)
2005–2008	Union St. Marien	52	(34)
2008–2010	SV Sierning	49	(20)
2010–2011	St. Florian	30	(21)
2011–2012	LASK Linz II	8	(2)
2011–2015	LASK Linz	94	(15)
2015–2017	SV Mattersburg	45	(5)
2017–2019	Blau-Weiß Linz	50	(7)
2019–	Union Weißkirchen	30	(19)
- * Club domestic league appearances and goals as of 21:56, 25 October 2020 (UTC)

Florian Templ (born 1 October 1988) is an Austrian footballer who plays for Union Weißkirchen.

== Career ==
=== Union Weißkirchen ===
On 1 July 2019, Templ moved to Union Weißkirchen after two seasons with FC Blau-Weiß Linz.
