= Mario Grgić =

Bosnian-Herzegovinian and Austrian footballer

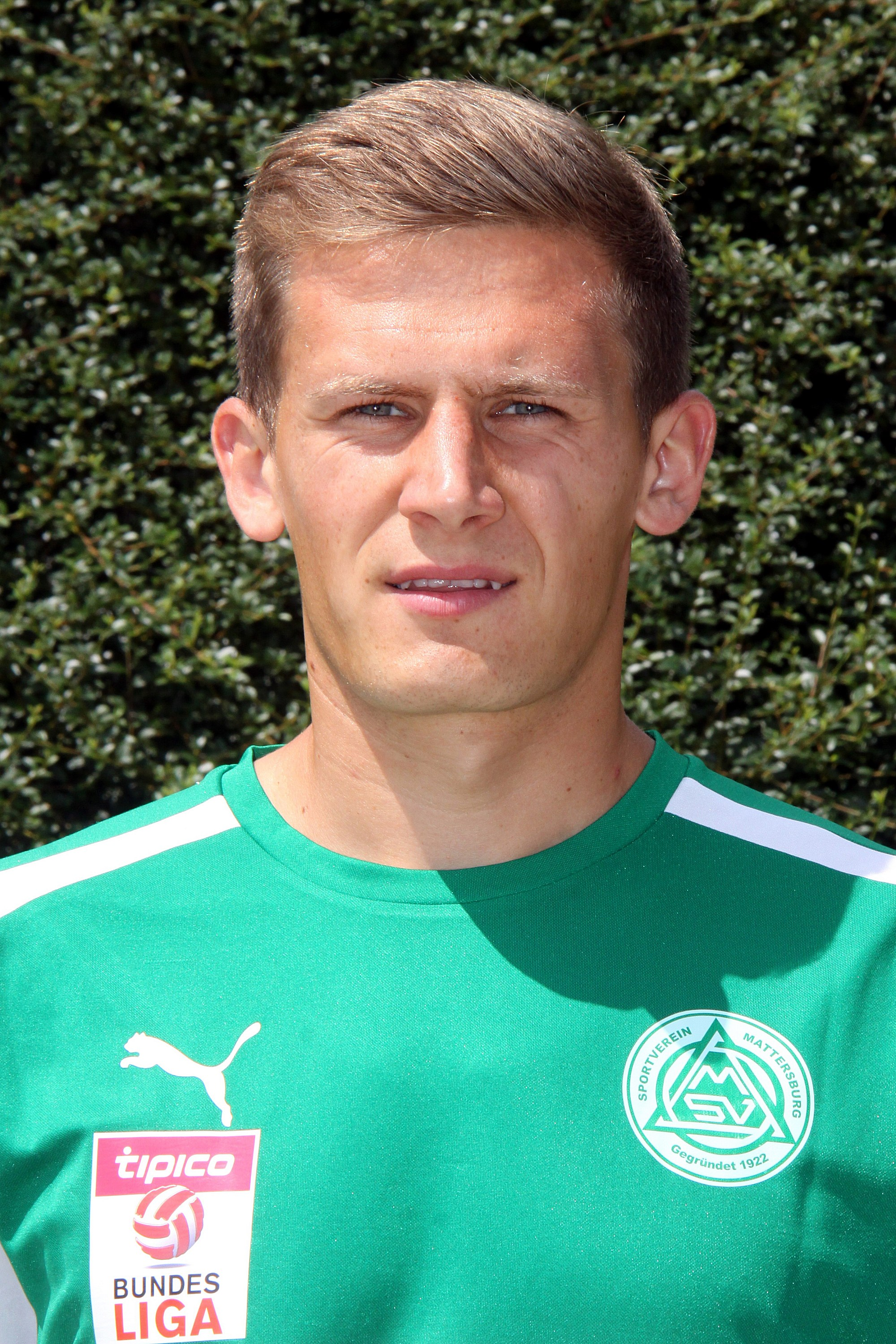
- Grgić in 2015

Personal information
- Date of birth: 10 September 1991 (age 35)
- Place of birth: Banja Luka, SFR Yugoslavia
- Height: 1.78 m (5 ft 10 in)
- Position: Midfielder

Team information
- Current team: Kapfenberger SV (academy coach)

Youth career
- KSV 1919
- 1999–2009: ASC Rapid Kapfenberg

Senior career*
Years	Team	Apps	(Gls)
2009–2015	Kapfenberger SV	106	(8)
2015–2019	SV Mattersburg	31	(3)
2020–2023	Kapfenberger SV	72	(4)

Managerial career
- 2023–: Kapfenberger SV (academy)
- 2025–: Kapfenberger SV (interim)
- * Club domestic league appearances and goals

Mario Grgić (born 10 September 1991) is an Austrian professional football coach and a former player who works with the academy of Kapfenberger SV. He was born in Banja Luka, Bosnia and Herzegovina.

== Managerial career ==
In July 2025, Grgić became interim head coach of Kapfenberger SV, following the dismissal of Ismail Atalan.
