= Manuel Seidl =

Austrian footballer

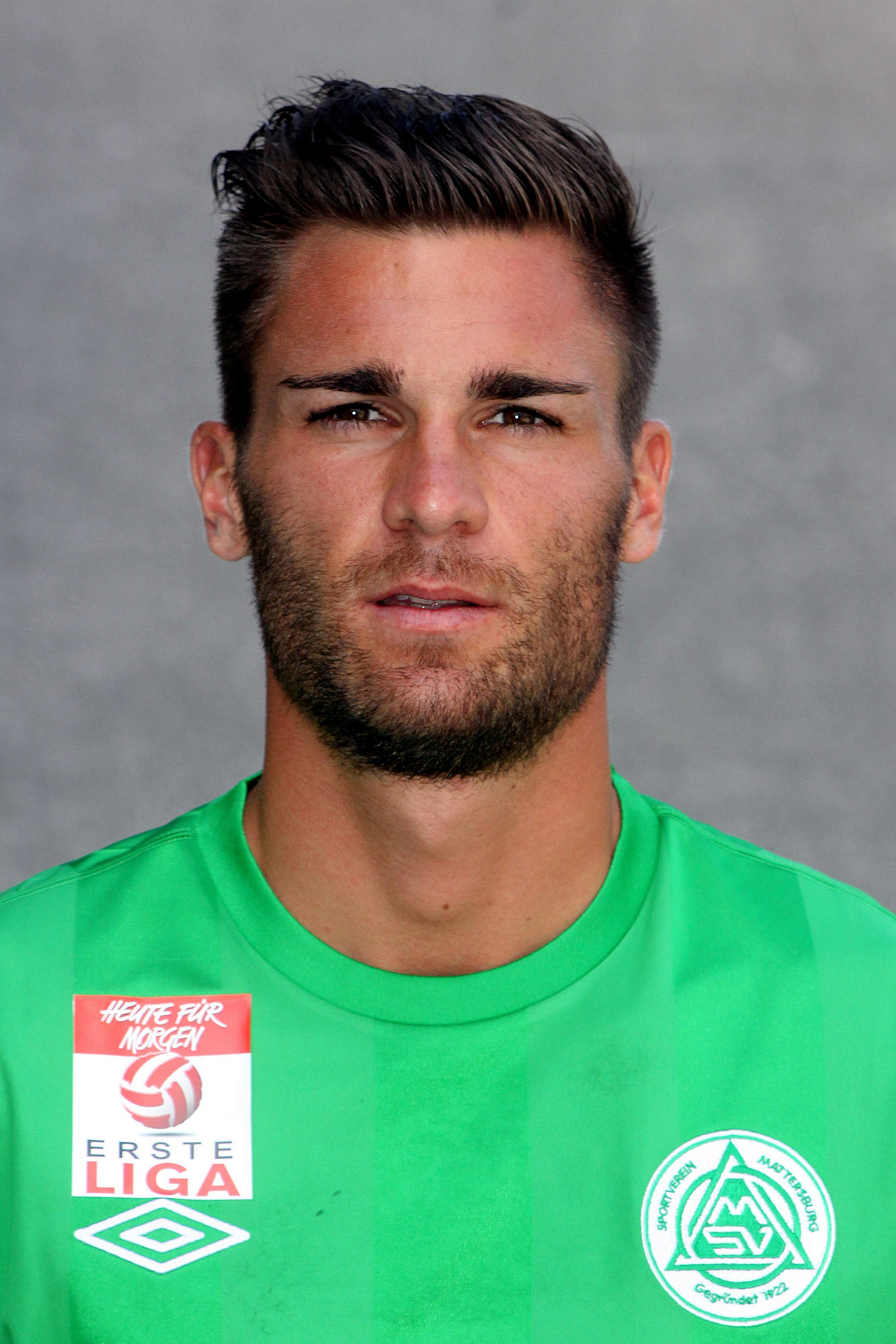

Personal information
- Date of birth: 26 October 1988 (age 38)
- Place of birth: Kirchschlag, Austria
- Height: 1.82 m (6 ft 0 in)
- Position: Midfielder

Youth career
- 1995–2003: USC Kirchschlag
- 2003–2007: AKA St. Pölten

Senior career*
| Years | Team | Apps | (Gls) |
| 2007–2014 | Mattersburg | 147 | (10) |
| 2014–2016 | Wolfsberger AC | 24 | (1) |
| 2016–2018 | Mattersburg | 16 | (2) |
| 2018–2019 | Wiener Neustadt | 15 | (1) |
| 2019–2021 | SKU Amstetten | 7 | (2) |
| 2021 | Wiener Neustädt | 11 | (0) |
- * Club domestic league appearances and goals

Manuel Seidl (born 26 October 1988) is an Austrian former footballer who played as a midfielder.
