= Bernd Kager =

Austrian footballer

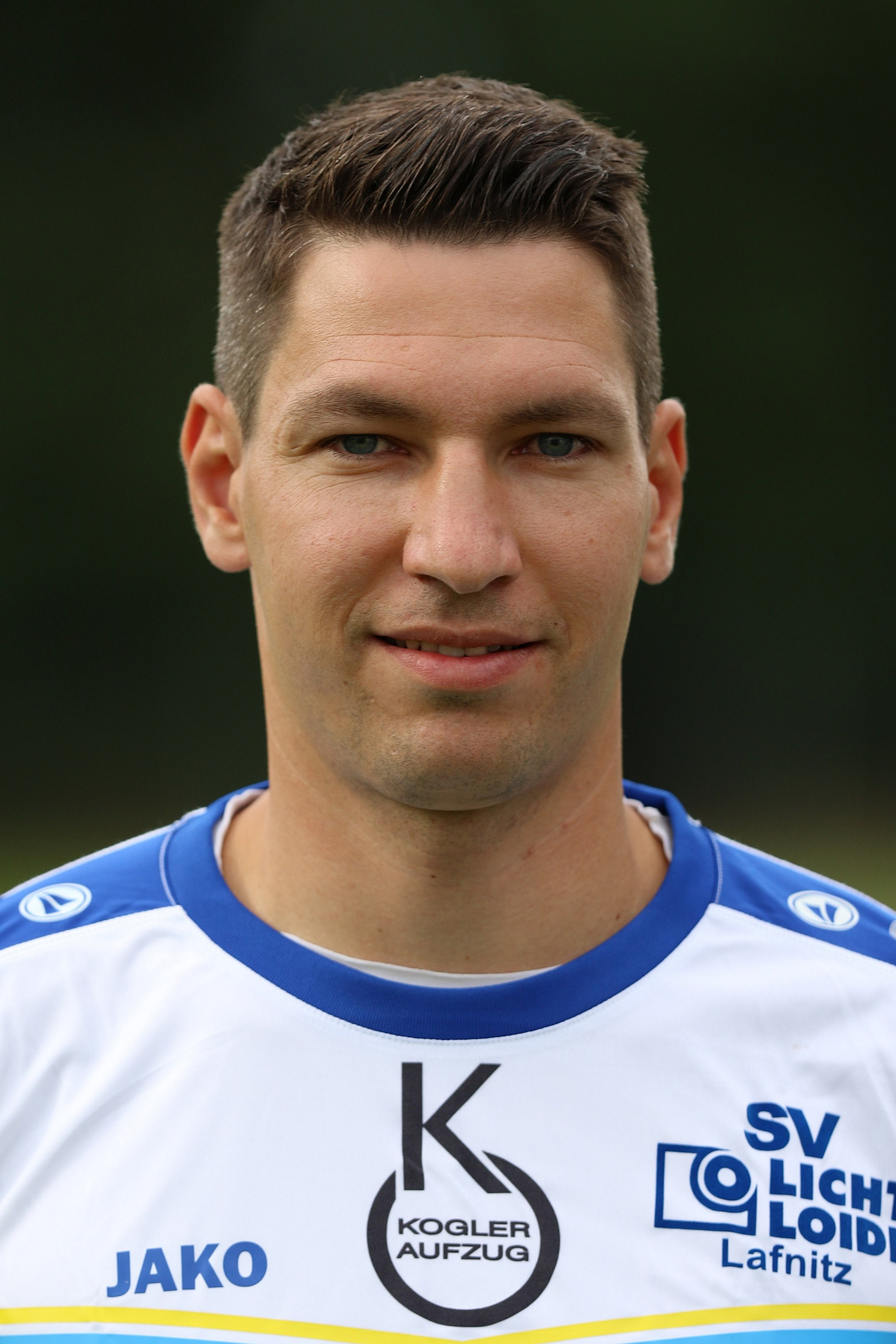
- Kager in 2017

Personal information
- Date of birth: 14 July 1987 (age 39)
- Place of birth: Austria
- Height: 1.90 m (6 ft 3 in)
- Position: Midfielder

Team information
- Current team: SV Oberwart
- Number: 15

Youth career
- 1994–2002: Hochneukirchen
- 2002–2006: SC Pinkafeld

Senior career*
Years	Team	Apps	(Gls)
2006–2008	SV Mattersburg II	16	(1)
2008–2014	SV Oberwart	56	(13)
2014–2016	Austria Klagenfurt	48	(6)
2016–2020	SV Lafnitz	92	(8)
2020–	SV Oberwart	7	(3)
- * Club domestic league appearances and goals as of 13:04, 17 January 2021 (UTC)

Bernd Kager (born 14 July 1987) is an Austrian footballer who currently plays as a midfielder for SV Oberwart.
