= 2016–17 Austrian Football Bundesliga =

105th season of top-tier football league in Austria

Austrian Bundesliga
- Season: 2016–17
- Dates: 23 July 2016 – 28 May 2017
- Champions: Red Bull Salzburg
- Relegated: SV Ried
- Champions League: Red Bull Salzburg
- Europa League: Austria Wien; Sturm Graz; Rheindorf Altach
- Matches: 180
- Goals: 488 (2.71 per match)
- Top goalscorer: Olarenwaju Kayode (17 goals)
- Biggest home win: Wolfsberger AC 5–0 Mödling; Rapid Wien 5–0 Ried; Salzburg 5–0 Austria Wien
- Biggest away win: Mödling 1–6 Austria Wien; Altach 0–5 Salzburg; Ried 1–6 Salzburg
- Highest scoring: Mödling 1–6 Austria Wien; Ried 1–6 Salzburg
- Highest attendance: 25,452; Rapid Wien 1–2 Sturm Graz (27 November 2016)
- Lowest attendance: 1,258; St. Pölten 0–4 Wolfsberger AC (30 November 2016)
- Total attendance: 1,268,237
- Average attendance: 7,046

The 2016–17 Austrian Football Bundesliga was the 105th season of top-tier football in Austria. Red Bull Salzburg are the defending champions. The fixtures were announced on 14 June 2016. The season began on 23 July 2016 and ended on 28 May 2017.

== Teams ==
St. Pölten, the 2015–16 First League champion, returned to the top level 22 years after their relegation.

=== Stadia and locations ===
Location of teams in the 2016–17 Austrian Football Bundesliga

Team	Location	Venue	Capacity
Admira Wacker Mödling	Maria Enzersdorf	BSFZ-Arena	10,800
Austria Wien	Vienna	Ernst-Happel-Stadion	50,865
Rapid Wien	Vienna	Allianz Stadion	28,000
Red Bull Salzburg	Wals-Siezenheim	Red Bull Arena	30,188
Rheindorf Altach	Altach	Stadion Schnabelholz	8,500
SV Ried	Ried im Innkreis	Keine Sorgen Arena	7,334
St. Pölten	Sankt Pölten	NV Arena	8,000
Sturm Graz	Graz	Merkur-Arena	15,323
SV Mattersburg	Mattersburg	Pappelstadion	17,100
Wolfsberger AC	Wolfsberg	Lavanttal-Arena	7,300

=== Personnel and kits ===
Team	Chairman	Manager	Manufacturer	Sponsors
Admira Wacker	(Austria) Philip Thonhauser	(Austria) Oliver Lederer	Nike	Flyeralarm
SCR Altach	(Austria) Johannes Engl	(Austria) Martin Scherb	Jako	Cashpoint
Austria Wien	(Austria) Wolfgang Katzian	(Germany) Thorsten Fink	Nike	Verbund
Rapid Wien	(Austria) Michael Krammer	(Austria) Damir Canadi	adidas	Wien Energie
SV Ried	(Austria) Johann Willminger	(Germany) Christian Benbennek	hummel	Josko
RB Salzburg	(Austria) Rudolf Theierl	(Spain) Óscar García	Nike	Red Bull
St. Pölten	(Austria) Gottfried Tröstl	(Austria) Jochen Fallmann	Jako	Hypo Noe
Sturm Graz	(Austria) Christian Jauk	(Germany) Franco Foda	Lotto	Puntigamer
SV Mattersburg	(Austria) Martin Pucher	(Austria) Ivica Vastić	Puma	Bauwelt Koch
Wolfsberger AC	(Austria) Dietmar Riegler	(Austria) Heimo Pfeifenberger	Jako	RZ Pellets

== League table ==
Pos	Team	Pld	W	D	L	GF	GA	GD	Pts	Qualification or relegation
1	Red Bull Salzburg (C)	36	25	6	5	74	24	+50	81	Qualification for the Champions League second qualifying round
2	Austria Wien	36	20	3	13	72	50	+22	63	Qualification for the Europa League third qualifying round
3	Sturm Graz	36	19	3	14	55	39	+16	60	Qualification for the Europa League second qualifying round
4	Rheindorf Altach	36	15	8	13	46	49	−3	53	Qualification for the Europa League first qualifying round
5	Rapid Wien	36	12	10	14	52	42	+10	46	
6	Admira Wacker Mödling	36	13	7	16	36	55	−19	46	
7	Mattersburg	36	12	7	17	39	54	−15	43	
8	Wolfsberger AC	36	11	9	16	40	59	−19	42	
9	St. Pölten	36	9	10	17	41	60	−19	37	
10	Ried (R)	36	10	5	21	33	56	−23	35	Relegation to Austrian Football First League

Source: weltfussball.de (in German), Soccerway
Rules for classification: 1) Points; 2) Goal difference; 3) Goals scored; 4) Matches won; 5) Away matches won; 6) Head-to-head points; 7) Head-to-head goal difference; 8) Head-to-head goals scored.
(C) Champions; (R) Relegated

== Results ==
=== First half of season ===
Home \ Away	ADM	AWI	ALT	RWI	RBS	RIE	StP	STU	MAT	WOL
Admira Wacker Mödling	—	0–2	1–2	1–2	0–4	1–0	1–1	0–3	1–0	4–1
Austria Wien	1–2	—	3–1	1–4	1–3	2–0	2–1	2–0	3–1	4–1
Rheindorf Altach	2–0	5–1	—	1–0	0–0	1–0	3–1	1–1	2–1	1–0
Rapid Wien	4–0	0–2	1–1	—	0–0	5–0	1–0	1–2	3–0	0–1
Red Bull Salzburg	0–1	4–1	4–1	2–1	—	1–0	2–0	0–1	3–1	1–1
Ried	2–1	1–1	2–1	4–2	0–2	—	1–2	1–0	2–1	0–1
St. Pölten	2–1	1–2	0–1	1–1	1–5	2–3	—	1–3	2–2	0–4
Sturm Graz	0–2	3–1	3–1	1–1	3–1	1–0	1–2	—	2–2	3–0
Mattersburg	0–1	0–2	1–2	1–1	2–1	1–1	1–1	0–2	—	3–1
Wolfsberger AC	5–0	0–3	1–2	1–1	2–2	1–0	1–1	0–4	3–0	—

Source: weltfussball.de (in German)
Legend: Blue = home team win; Yellow = draw; Red = away team win.
For upcoming matches, an "a" indicates there is an article about the rivalry between the two participants.

=== Second half of season ===
Home \ Away	ADM	AWI	ALT	RWI	RBS	RIE	StP	STU	MAT	WOL
Admira Wacker Mödling	—	1–6	1–1	3–2	1–1	1–0	2–0	1–0	0–2	3–2
Austria Wien	0–2	—	1–3	1–1	2–3	3–0	1–2	4–1	2–0	3–0
Rheindorf Altach	0–0	1–1	—	3–1	0–5	0–2	1–2	1–2	3–0	2–1
Rapid Wien	0–0	0–2	3–0	—	0–1	3–1	2–1	1–0	1–1	4–0
Red Bull Salzburg	2–0	5–0	1–0	1–0	—	1–1	2–0	1–0	1–0	3–0
Ried	1–0	0–3	2–0	3–0	1–6	—	1–1	0–3	2–3	1–1
St. Pölten	2–2	2–1	3–3	1–1	1–2	1–0	—	2–1	1–0	1–1
Sturm Graz	2–1	0–4	3–0	2–0	0–1	1–0	3–2	—	0–2	4–0
Mattersburg	2–0	0–3	1–0	1–3	2–1	2–1	1–0	1–0	—	2–1
Wolfsberger AC	1–1	2–1	0–0	2–1	0–2	1–0	1–0	1–0	2–2	—

Source: weltfussball.de (in German)
Legend: Blue = home team win; Yellow = draw; Red = away team win.
For upcoming matches, an "a" indicates there is an article about the rivalry between the two participants.

== Season statistics ==
=== Top goalscorers ===
As of 29 May 2017

Rank	Scorerbb	Club	Goals
1	(Nigeria) Olarenwaju Kayode	Austria	17
2	(Austria) Deni Alar	Sturm	16
3	(South Korea) Hwang Hee-chan	Salzburg	12
4	(Japan) Takumi Minamino	Salzburg	11
4	(Austria) Alexander Grünwald	Austria	11
6	(Switzerland) Dimitri Oberlin	Altach	10
6	(Austria) Christoph Monschein	Admira	10
6	(Austria) Nikola Dovedan	Altach	10
9	(Spain) Jonathan Soriano	Salzburg	8
9	(Austria) Patrick Bürger	SV Mattersburg	8
9	(Libya) Ismael Tajouri	Austria	8
9	(Brazil) Joelinton	Rapid Wien	8
9	(Austria) Christoph Knasmüllner	Admira	8
9	(Austria) Raphael Holzhauser	Austria	8
15	(Georgia (country)) Giorgi Kvilitaia	Rapid Wien	7
15	(Cameroon) Moumi Ngamaleu	Altach	7
15	(Brazil) Lucas Venuto	Austria	7
15	(Austria) Philipp Prosenik	Wolfsberger AC	7
15	(Kosovo) Valon Berisha	Salzburg	7

== Attendances ==
Pos	Team	Total	High	Low	Average	Change
1	SK Rapid Wien	378,594	25,452	16,815	21,033	+24.8%
2	Sturm Graz	189,544	16,604	7,487	10,530	+24.0%
3	Austria Wien	142,590	15,576	5,143	7,921	+10.6%
4	Red Bull Salzburg	140,984	15,692	3,889	7,832	−7.7%
5	Rheindorf Altach	95,930	7,462	3,836	5,329	+11.5%
6	Ried	73,848	6,611	2,448	4,102	+1.7%
7	St. Pölten	67,234	7,871	1,258	3,735	+36.7%^{1}
8	Wolfsberger AC	66,747	6,110	2,572	3,708	+4.3%
9	Mattersburg	64,939	9,527	1,890	3,607	−26.6%
10	Admira Wacker Mödling	47,827	5,036	1,576	2,657	−6.7%
	League total	1,268,237	25,452	1,258	7,046	+12.4%

Source: bundesliga.at
Notes:
1: Team played last season in First League

== Awards ==
=== Annual awards ===
==== Player of the Year ====
The Player of the Year awarded to (Austria) Andreas Ulmer (Red Bull Salzburg)

==== Top goalscorer ====
The Top goalscorer of the Year awarded to (Nigeria) Olarenwaju Kayode (Austria Wien)

==== Manager of the Year ====
The Manager of the Year awarded to (Spain) Oscar Garcia (Red Bull Salzburg)

==== Breakthrough of the Year ====
The Breakthrough of the Year awarded to (Austria) Konrad Laimer (Red Bull Salzburg)

=== Team of the Year ===

Team of the Season
Goalkeeper	(Germany) Alexander Walke (Red Bull Salzburg)			
Defence	(Austria) Stefan Lainer (Red Bull Salzburg)	(Brazil) Paulo Miranda (Red Bull Salzburg)	(Austria) Philipp Netzer (Rheindorf Altach)	(Greece) Charalampos Lykogiannis (Sturm Graz)
Midfield	(Brazil) Lucas Venuto (Austria Wien)	(Austria) Konrad Laimer (Red Bull Salzburg)	Alexander Grünwald (Austria Wien)	(Kosovo) Valon Berisha (Red Bull Salzburg)
Attack	(Austria) Deni Alar (Sturm Graz)		(Nigeria) Olarenwaju Kayode (Austria Wien)	
