= Michael Perlak =

Austrian footballer

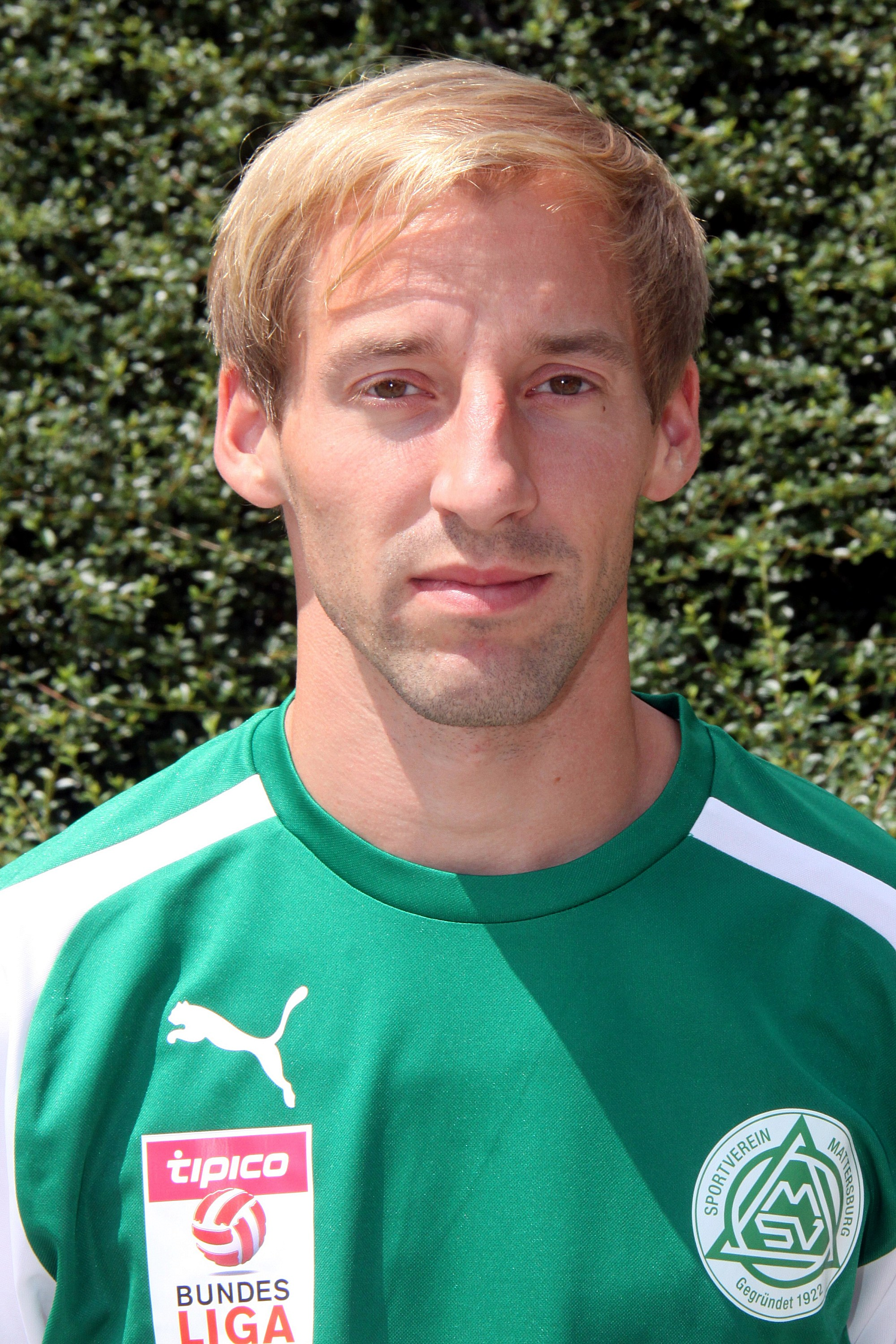

Personal information
- Date of birth: 26 December 1985 (age 40)
- Place of birth: Salzburg, Austria
- Height: 1.71 m (5 ft 7 in)
- Position: Midfielder

Team information
- Current team: SV Kuchl

Youth career
- FC Salzburg
- 1996–2002: ASV Taxham

Senior career*
Years	Team	Apps	(Gls)
2002–2003	ASV Taxham		
2003–2007	SV Kuchl		
2007–2008	USK Anif	37	(10)
2008–2011	SV Grödig	61	(3)
2011–2012	USK Anif	30	(11)
2012–2014	Austria Salzburg	53	(24)
2014–2019	SV Mattersburg	113	(13)
2019–2020	Wiener Neustadt	16	(3)
2020–2021	Mauerwerk	1	(0)
2021	FC Stadlau	5	(0)
2022–2023	USK Anif	26	(6)
2023–	SV Kuchl	11	(3)
- * Club domestic league appearances and goals as of 5 November 2023

Michael Perlak (born 26 December 1985) is an Austrian footballer who plays as a midfielder for the fourth-tier Salzburger Liga club SV Kuchl. (Note: Austrian Bundesliga source includes 2008–09 and 2010–11 seasons only. It does not include figures for the 2009–10 third-tier season, nor for any previous seasons in the regional leagues.)

== Honours ==
SV Mattersburg

Winner

- Austrian Football First League: 2014–15
