= Markus Pink =

Austrian footballer (born 1991)

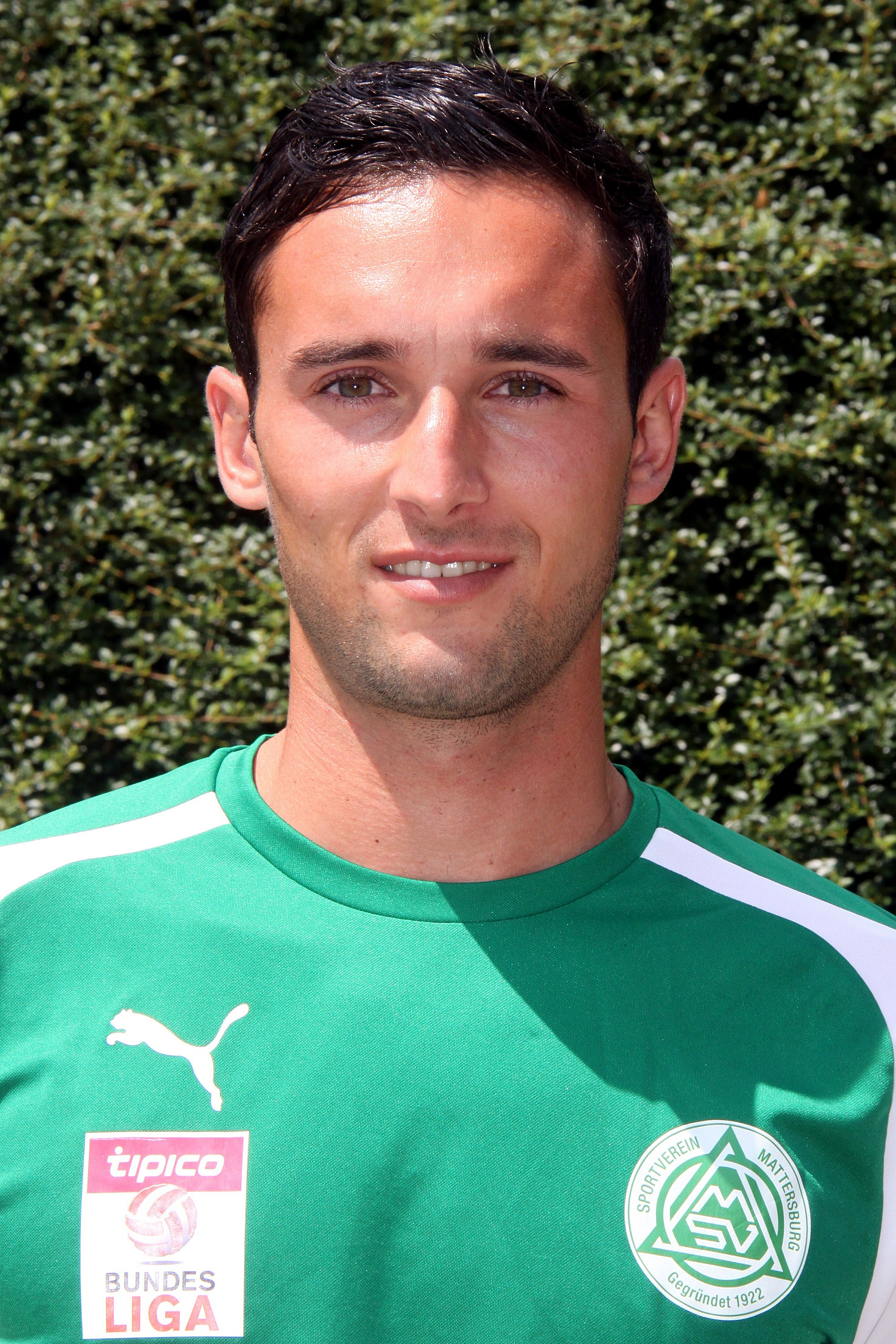
- Pink with Mattersburg in 2015

Personal information
- Date of birth: 24 February 1991 (age 35)
- Place of birth: Klagenfurt, Austria
- Height: 1.88 m (6 ft 2 in)
- Position: Forward

Team information
- Current team: Wolfsberger AC
- Number: 32

Youth career
- 1997–2005: FC Ochsendorf
- 2005–2007: FC Kärnten
- 2007–2008: Austria Kärnten

Senior career*
Years	Team	Apps	(Gls)
2008–2010	Austria Kärnten	28	(1)
2010–2011	Austria Klagenfurt	24	(3)
2011–2012	ASKÖ Köttmannsdorf	?	(30)
2012–2013	First Vienna	29	(10)
2013–2018	SV Mattersburg	114	(40)
2018–2020	Sturm Graz	34	(6)
2020	Admira Wacker	10	(1)
2020–2023	Austria Klagenfurt	82	(46)
2023	Shanghai Port	15	(2)
2024	Sandhausen	18	(5)
2024–	Wolfsberger AC	44	(12)
- * Club domestic league appearances and goals as of 10 June 2026

Markus Pink (born 24 February 1991) is an Austrian professional association footballer who plays as a forward for Wolfsberger AC.

== Career ==
=== Admira Wacker ===
On 8 January 2020, it was confirmed, that Pink had joined FC Admira Wacker Mödling.

=== Shanghai Port ===
On 2 April 2023, Pink joined Chinese Super League club Shanghai Port.

=== SV Sandhausen ===
On 4 January 2024, Pink joined 3. Liga club SV Sandhausen.

=== Wolfsberger AC ===
On 29 August 2024, Pink returned to Austria and signed a two-season contract with Wolfsberger AC.

== Career statistics ==
As of match played 24 May 2025

Appearances and goals by club, season and competition
Club	Season	League			Cup		Continental		Other		Total	
Club	Season	Division	Apps	Goals	Apps	Goals	Apps	Goals	Apps	Goals	Apps	Goals
Austria Kärnten	2008–09	Austrian Bundesliga	3	0	0	0	—		—		3	0
Austria Kärnten	2009–10	Austrian Bundesliga	25	1	2	2	—		—		27	3
Austria Kärnten	Total		28	1	2	2	—		—		30	3
Austria Klagenfurt	2010–11	Austrian Regionalliga	24	3	2	1	—		—		26	4
ASKÖ Köttmannsdorf							—		—			
First Vienna	2012–13	Austrian Football First League	21	7	1	2	—		—		22	9
First Vienna	2013–14	Austrian Football First League	8	3	1	0	—		—		9	3
First Vienna	Total		29	10	2	2	—		—		31	12
SV Mattersburg	2013–14	Austrian Football First League	17	4	1	0	—		—		18	4
SV Mattersburg	2014–15	Austrian Football First League	23	21	1	1	—		—		24	22
SV Mattersburg	2015–16	Austrian Bundesliga	31	8	3	1	—		—		34	9
SV Mattersburg	2016–17	Austrian Bundesliga	14	1	1	0	—		—		15	1
SV Mattersburg	2017–18	Austrian Bundesliga	29	6	3	2	—		—		32	8
SV Mattersburg	Total		114	40	9	4	—		—		123	44
Sturm Graz	2018–19	Austrian Bundesliga	25	6	1	1	3	0	2	0	31	7
Sturm Graz	2019–20	Austrian Bundesliga	9	0	1	0	1	0	—		11	0
Sturm Graz	Total		34	6	2	1	4	0	2	0	42	7
Admira Wacker	2019–20	Austrian Bundesliga	10	1	0	0	—		—		10	1
Austria Klagenfurt	2020–21	2. Liga	30	18	4	2	—		2	3	36	23
Austria Klagenfurt	2021–22	Austrian Bundesliga	30	12	4	3	—		—		34	15
Austria Klagenfurt	2022–23	Austrian Bundesliga	22	16	3	1	—		—		25	17
Austria Klagenfurt	Total		82	46	11	6	—		2	3	95	55
Shanghai Port	2023	Chinese Super League	15	2	2	1	1	1	—		18	4
Sandhausen	2023–24	3. Liga	16	5	—		—		2	2	18	7
Sandhausen	2024–25	3. Liga	2	0	1	0	—		1	2	4	2
Sandhausen	Total		18	5	1	0	—		3	4	22	9
Wolfsberger AC	2024–25	Austrian Bundesliga	22	4	3	0	—		—		25	4
Career total			376	118	34	18	5	1	7	7	422	144

== Honours ==
Mattersburg

- Austrian Football First League: 2014–15

Shanghai Port

- Chinese Super League: 2023

Individual

- Austrian Football First League top scorer: 2014–15
