= Philipp Erhardt =

Austrian footballer

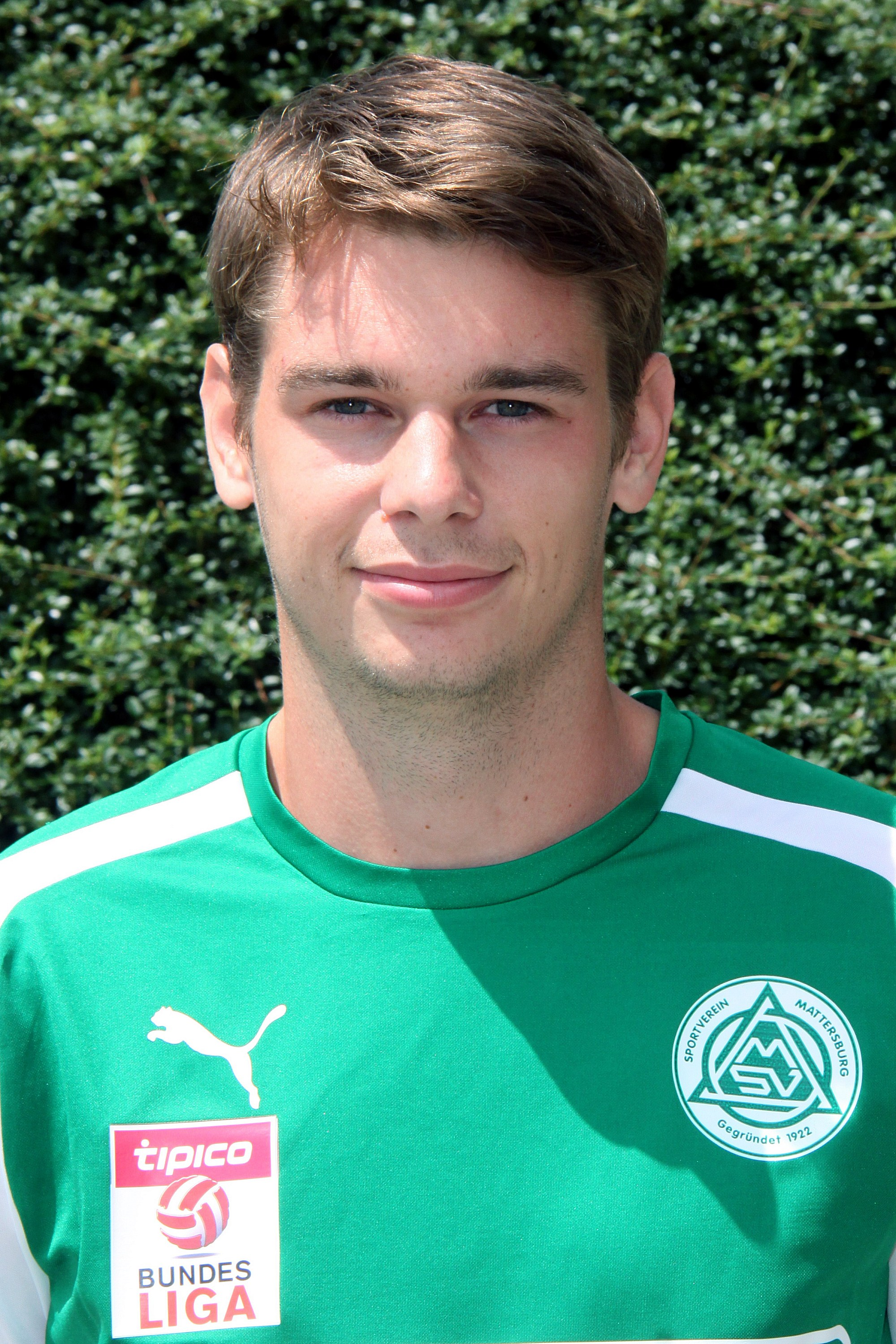
- Erhardt in 2015

Personal information
- Date of birth: 10 September 1993 (age 33)
- Place of birth: Austria
- Height: 1.85 m (6 ft 1 in)
- Position: Midfielder

Team information
- Current team: ASV Draßburg
- Number: 4

Senior career*
Years	Team	Apps	(Gls)
2010–2015	SV Mattersburg II	95	(1)
2012–2020	SV Mattersburg	117	(1)
2020–2021	Türkgücü München	29	(1)
2021–2023	TSV Hartberg	20	(0)
2023–	ASV Draßburg	3	(0)
- * Club domestic league appearances and goals as of 11 August 2023

Philipp Erhardt (born 10 September 1993) is an Austrian professional footballer who plays as a midfielder for Austrian Regionalliga club ASV Draßburg.
