= Patrick Salomon =

Austrian footballer

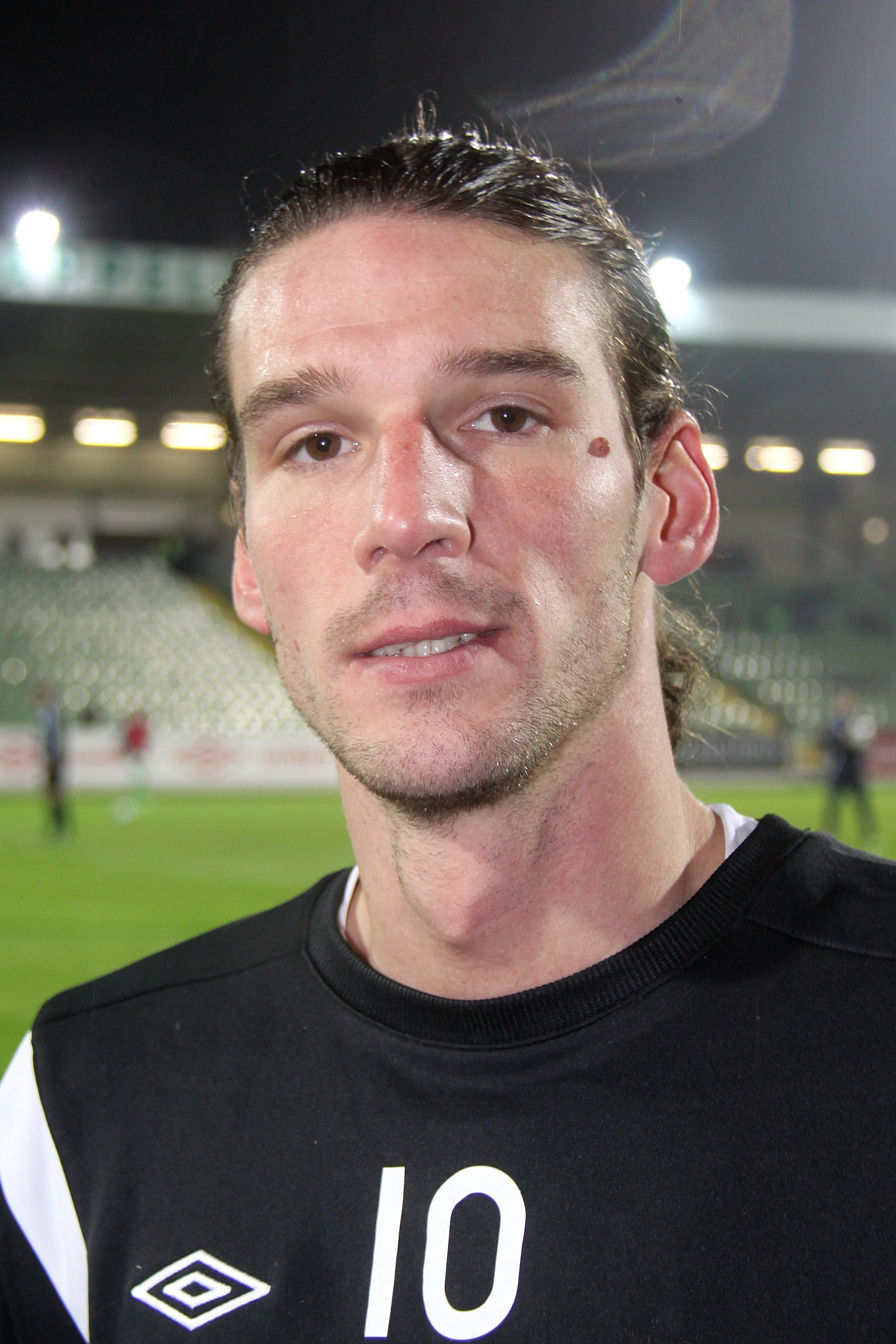

Personal information
- Full name: Patrick Salomon
- Date of birth: 10 June 1988 (age 38)
- Place of birth: Vienna, Austria
- Height: 1.80 m (5 ft 11 in)
- Position: Midfielder

Youth career
- 1993–1997: Floridsdorfer AC
- 1993–1997: Austria Wien
- 2003–2005: Floridsdorfer AC

Senior career*
Years	Team	Apps	(Gls)
2005–2008	Floridsdorfer AC	45	(6)
2008–2010	Austria Lustenau	58	(8)
2010–2012	Austria Wien II	16	(1)
2010–2012	Austria Wien	7	(0)
2012–2014	Austria Lustenau	46	(12)
2014–2018	Rheindorf Altach	112	(5)
2018–2020	Mattersburg	50	(1)
2020–2022	Atromitos	57	(2)
2022	Šibenik	14	(1)
- * Club domestic league appearances and goals as of 4 December 2022

Patrick Salomon (born 10 June 1988) is a former Austrian professional footballer who played as a midfielder, lastly for the Croatian HNL club Šibenik.

== Career ==
In early December 2022, HNK Šibenik announced that Salomon has ended his professional career.
