= Danijel Prskalo =

Croatian footballer (born 1990)

Personal information
- Date of birth: 27 October 1990 (age 36)
- Place of birth: Mostar, SFR Yugoslavia
- Height: 1.90 m (6 ft 3 in)
- Position: Forward

Team information
- Current team: SC Weiz
- Number: 20

Youth career
- 1998–2007: Sportunion Semriach
- 2007–2009: Sturm Graz

Senior career*
| Years | Team | Apps | (Gls) |
| 2008–2009 | Sturm Graz II | 10 | (0) |
| 2009–2010 | Schalke 04 II | 14 | (1) |
| 2010–2011 | Red Bull Salzburg Juniors | 20 | (11) |
| 2011–2012 | Wiener Neustadt | 16 | (0) |
| 2012–2013 | Rheindorf Altach | 25 | (4) |
| 2013–2014 | SC Ritzing | 29 | (8) |
| 2014–2015 | TSV Hartberg | 33 | (9) |
| 2015–2016 | Floridsdorfer AC | 23 | (1) |
| 2016– | SC Weiz | 155 | (76) |

International career
| 2008 | Croatia U19 | 3 | (2) |
- * Club domestic league appearances and goals as of 26 November 2022

Danijel Prskalo (born 27 October 1990) is a Croatian footballer who plays as a forward for SC Weiz.
