= Patrick Bürger =

Austrian footballer (born 1987)

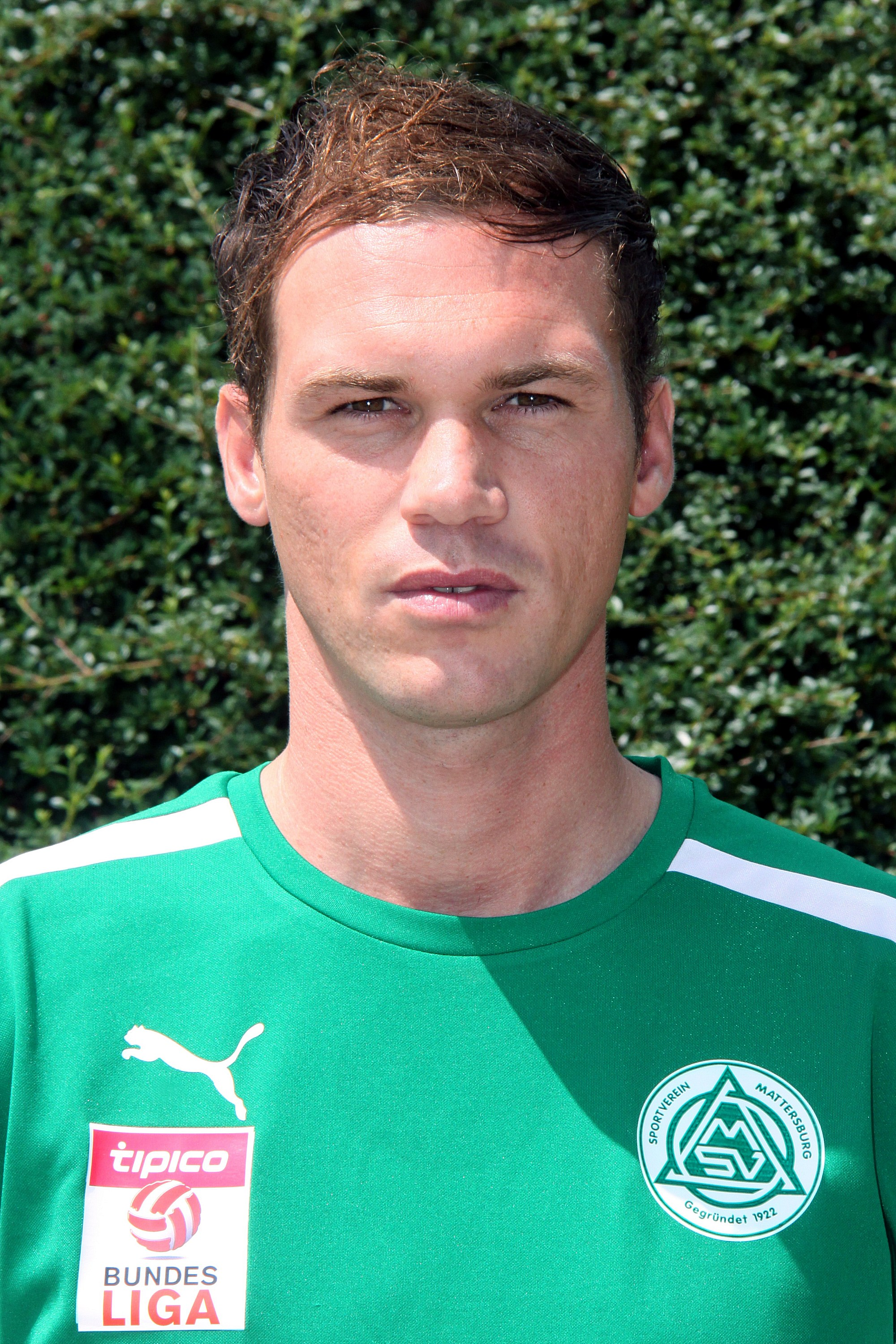

Personal information
- Date of birth: 27 June 1987 (age 39)
- Place of birth: Oberwart, Austria
- Height: 1.87 m (6 ft 2 in)
- Position: Forward

Team information
- Current team: SC Pinkafeld

Senior career*
Years	Team	Apps	(Gls)
2005–2008	Mattersburg	43	(3)
2008–2010	Hartberg	55	(28)
2010–2020	Mattersburg	215	(57)
2020–2021	SV Lafnitz	20	(3)
2022–	SC Pinkafeld	0	(0)

International career^{‡}
2012	Austria	2	(0)
- * Club domestic league appearances and goals as of 4 January 2021 ‡ National team caps and goals as of 17:08, 18 January 2013 (UTC)

Patrick Bürger (born 27 June 1987) is an Austrian professional footballer who plays for SC Pinkafeld.

== Club career ==
On 23 December 2021, Bürger signed with SC Pinkafeld in the fourth-tier Landesliga Burgenland.

== International career ==
Bürger debuted for the Austrian senior squad on 1 June 2012 in a 3–2 friendly victory against Ukraine.
