= 2014–15 Austrian Football First League =

Austrian Football First League
- Season: 2014–15
- Champions: SV Mattersburg
- Promoted: SV Mattersburg
- Relegated: SV Horn; TSV Hartberg
- Matches: 180
- Goals: 476 (2.64 per match)
- Top goalscorer: Markus Pink (21 goals)

The 2014–15 Austrian Football First League was the 41st season of the Austrian second-level football league. It began on 18 July 2014 and ended on 29 May 2015.

== League table ==
Pos	Team	Pld	W	D	L	GF	GA	GD	Pts	Promotion or relegation
1	SV Mattersburg (C, P)	36	21	8	7	69	36	+33	71	Promotion to 2015–16 Austrian Bundesliga
2	FC Liefering	36	20	5	11	70	55	+15	65	Ineligible for promotion
3	LASK Linz	36	15	11	10	45	36	+9	56	
4	Kapfenberger SV	36	12	13	11	52	45	+7	49	
5	SKN St. Pölten	36	13	10	13	39	41	−2	49	
6	FC Wacker Innsbruck	36	11	10	15	32	43	−11	43	
7	SC Austria Lustenau	36	11	9	16	49	56	−7	42	
8	Floridsdorfer AC	36	9	14	13	40	49	−9	41	
9	SV Horn (R)	36	10	8	18	34	50	−16	38	Relegation to 2015–16 Austrian Regionalliga
10	TSV Hartberg (R)	36	10	8	18	46	65	−19	38	Relegation to 2015–16 Austrian Regionalliga

Rules for classification: 1) Points; 2) Goal difference; 3) Goals scored
(C) Champions; (P) Promoted; (R) Relegated

== Top scorers ==
As of 30 May 2015

Rank	Scorer	Club	Goals
1	(Austria) Markus Pink	SV Mattersburg	21
2	(Austria) Karim Onisiwo	SV Mattersburg	18
3	(Bosnia and Herzegovina) Smail Prevljak	FC Liefering	14
4	(Austria) Radovan Vujanović	LASK Linz	13
5	(Brazil) Felipe Pires	FC Liefering	11
6	(Spain) Daniel Lucas Segovia	SKN St. Pölten	10
6	(Austria) David Witteveen	Kapfenberger SV	10
8	(Croatia) Danijel Prskalo	TSV Hartberg	9
9	(Brazil) Thiago De Lima Silva	SC Austria Lustenau	8
9	(Austria) Manuel Hartl	SKN St. Pölten	8
9	(Austria) Lukas Mössner	Floridsdorfer AC	8
