= List of Austrian football transfers summer 2017 =

This is a list of Austrian football transfers in the summer transfer window 2017 by club. Only transfers of the Austrian Football Bundesliga, and Austrian Football First League are included.

== Austrian Football Bundesliga ==
Note: Flags indicate national team as has been defined under FIFA eligibility rules. Players may hold more than one non-FIFA nationality.

=== FC Admira Wacker Mödling ===
In:

No.	Pos.	Nation	Player
37	DF	AUT	Marcel Holzmann (from SKN St. Pölten)
44	FW	CRO	Marin Jakoliš (from (Belgium) K.S.V. Roeselare)
--	DF	CMR	Macky Bagnack (from (Spain) Real Zaragoza)

Out:

No.	Pos.	Nation	Player
9	FW	AUT	Toni Vastic (to FK Austria Wien II)
14	FW	AUT	Christoph Monschein (to FK Austria Wien)
18	MF	AUT	Daniel Hautzinger (loan return to FC Liefering)
19	FW	AUT	Nico Löffler (to (Germany) VfB Lübeck)
20	DF	AUT	Markus Pavic (to (Croatia) NK Rudeš)
93	FW	AUT	Srđan Spiridonović (to (Greece) Panionios F.C.)
--	FW	CGO	Dzon Delarge (to (Turkey) Bursaspor, previously on loan at (Turkey) Osmanlıspor)

=== FK Austria Wien ===
In:

No.	Pos.	Nation	Player
5	MF	AUT	Vesel Demaku (from FC Red Bull Salzburg U18)
8	DF	AUT	Florian Klein (from (Germany) VfB Stuttgart)
14	FW	AUT	Christoph Monschein (from FC Admira Wacker Mödling)
18	DF	GER	Heiko Westermann (from (Netherlands) AFC Ajax)
21	MF	KOR	Lee Jin-hyun (on loan from (South Korea) Pohang Steelers)
--	FW	NGA	Abdullahi Ibrahim Alhassan (on loan from (Nigeria) Akwa United F.C.)
--	DF	BRA	Ruan (on loan from (Brazil) Guaratinguetá Futebol)

Out:

No.	Pos.	Nation	Player
4	DF	CRO	Petar Filipović (to (Turkey) Konyaspor)
8	FW	NGA	Olarenwaju Kayode (to (England) Manchester City F.C.)
27	FW	AUT	Marko Kvasina (to (Netherlands) FC Twente)
37	MF	AUT	David Cancola (on loan to SC Wiener Neustadt)

=== LASK Linz ===
In:

No.	Pos.	Nation	Player
4	DF	AUT	Emanuel Pogatetz (from (Germany) 1. FC Union Berlin)
14	FW	BRA	Bruno (from SC Austria Lustenau)
18	MF	AUT	Gernot Trauner (from SV Ried)
23	MF	AUS	James Holland (from (China) Liaoning Whowin F.C.)
27	MF	AUT	Thomas Goiginger (from FC Blau-Weiß Linz)
30	FW	BRA	Alan (from (Brazil) Volta Redonda Futebol Clube)
31	GK	AUT	Alexander Schlager (from FC Liefering)
37	FW	GER	Mërgim Berisha (on loan from FC Red Bull Salzburg)
--	MF	BRA	Victor Sá (from Kapfenberger SV)

Out:

No.	Pos.	Nation	Player
3	MF	AUT	Manuel Kerhe (to SV Ried)
14	DF	GHA	Kennedy Boateng (on loan to SV Ried)
25	DF	BRA	Paulo Otávio (to (Germany) FC Ingolstadt 04)
37	MF	AUT	Fabian Miesenböck (to SC Wiener Neustadt)

=== SV Mattersburg ===
In:

No.	Pos.	Nation	Player
11	MF	AUT	Andreas Gruber (from SK Sturm Graz)
12	DF	AUT	Florian Hart (from SV Ried)
14	FW	BIH	Smail Prevljak (on loan from FC Red Bull Salzburg)
17	MF	AUT	Rene Renner (from FC Blau-Weiß Linz)
27	MF	AUT	Florian Sittsam (from SC Wiener Neustadt)
29	FW	JPN	Masaya Okugawa (on loan from FC Liefering)

Out:

No.	Pos.	Nation	Player
2	DF	LVA	Vitālijs Maksimenko (to (Poland) Bruk-Bet Termalica Nieciecza)
11	FW	AUT	Alexander Ibser (to ASK Ebreichsdorf)
13	FW	AUT	Florian Templ (to FC Blau-Weiß Linz)
15	MF	AUT	Sven Sprangler (to TSV Hartberg)
17	DF	AUT	Patrick Farkas (to FC Red Bull Salzburg)
27	MF	AUT	Thorsten Röcher (to SK Sturm Graz)
28	MF	AUT	Francesco Lovrić (to SC Austria Lustenau)
29	MF	GHA	David Atanga (loan return to FC Red Bull Salzburg)

=== SK Rapid Wien ===
In:

No.	Pos.	Nation	Player
5	DF	BEL	Boli Bolingoli-Mbombo (from (Belgium) Club Brugge KV)

Out:

No.	Pos.	Nation	Player
1	GK	SVK	Ján Novota (to (Hungary) Debreceni VSC)
3	DF	AUT	Christoph Schößwendter (to (Germany) 1. FC Union Berlin)
23	MF	ISL	Arnór Ingvi Traustason (on loan to (Greece) AEK Athens F.C.)
46	GK	HUN	Zsolt Rátkai (to FCM Traiskirchen)

=== FC Red Bull Salzburg ===
In:

No.	Pos.	Nation	Player
25	DF	AUT	Patrick Farkas (from SV Mattersburg)
34	DF	CRO	Marin Pongračić (from (Germany) TSV 1860 Munich)

Out:

No.	Pos.	Nation	Player
6	DF	SUI	Christian Schwegler (to (Switzerland) FC Luzern)
20	FW	BIH	Smail Prevljak (on loan to SV Mattersburg)
25	MF	CRO	Josip Radošević (to (Croatia) HNK Hajduk Split)
27	MF	AUT	Konrad Laimer (to (Germany) RB Leipzig)
28	DF	DEN	Asger Sørensen (on loan to (Germany) SSV Jahn Regensburg)
34	GK	GHA	Lawrence Ati-Zigi (to (France) FC Sochaux-Montbéliard)
47	DF	ENG	Andre Wisdom (loan return to (England) Liverpool F.C.)
94	MF	BRA	Wanderson (to (Russia) FC Krasnodar)

=== SC Rheindorf Altach ===
In:

No.	Pos.	Nation	Player

Out:

No.	Pos.	Nation	Player
8	DF	AUT	Stefan Umjenovic (to Floridsdorfer AC)
9	FW	AUT	Martin Harrer (to FC Wacker Innsbruck)
11	MF	AUT	Nikola Dovedan (loan return to LASK Linz)
14	MF	AUT	Nikola Zivotic (on loan to SC Wiener Neustadt)
15	MF	SUI	Gabriel Lüchinger (to SV Ried)
21	MF	AUT	Daniel Luxbacher (to SKN St. Pölten)
22	DF	AUT	Lukas Jäger (to (Germany) 1. FC Nürnberg)
27	DF	AUT	Christian Schilling (to SV Ried)

=== SKN St. Pölten ===
In:

No.	Pos.	Nation	Player
--	FW	GER	Devante Parker (on loan from (Germany) 1. FSV Mainz 05)
7	MF	AUT	Daniel Luxbacher (from SC Rheindorf Altach)
11	FW	FIN	Roope Riski (from (Finland) SJK Seinäjoki)
19	FW	AUT	Lorenz Grabovac (from FC Liefering)
22	DF	AUT	Sandro Ingolitsch (from FC Liefering)
28	MF	AUT	Damir Mehmedovic (from FC Blau-Weiß Linz)

Out:

No.	Pos.	Nation	Player
10	MF	SEN	Cheikhou Dieng (loan return to (Turkey) İstanbul Başakşehir F.K.)
11	MF	AUT	Christopher Drazan (to SC Austria Lustenau)
15	DF	AUT	Martin Grasegger (to SC Austria Lustenau)
18	DF	ROU	Paul Pîrvulescu (to (Poland) Wisła Płock)
19	MF	AUT	Manuel Hartl (to FC Blau-Weiß Linz)
23	DF	AUT	Marcel Holzmann (to FC Admira Wacker Mödling)
26	MF	AUT	Marco Perchtold (to Grazer AK)
44	GK	AUT	Felix Gschossmann (to SKU Amstetten)

=== SK Sturm Graz ===
In:

No.	Pos.	Nation	Player
15	MF	AUT	Oliver Filip (from FC Liefering)
17	MF	AUT	Peter Žulj (from SV Ried)
22	DF	AUT	Patrick Puchegger (from (Germany) FC Bayern Munich II)
27	GK	AUT	Jörg Siebenhandl (from (Germany) Würzburger Kickers)
28	FW	AUT	Fabian Schubert (from SV Ried)
29	MF	AUT	Thorsten Röcher (from SV Mattersburg)
36	DF	AUT	Fabian Wetl (from SV Lafnitz)

Out:

No.	Pos.	Nation	Player
10	MF	AUT	Marko Stanković (to SV Ried)
22	MF	AUT	Andreas Gruber (to SV Mattersburg)
27	DF	AUT	Lukas Skrivanek (on loan to FC Blau-Weiß Linz)
28	MF	TUR	Barış Atik (loan return to (Germany) TSG 1899 Hoffenheim)
29	MF	AUT	Sascha Horvath (to (Germany) Dynamo Dresden)
36	FW	AUT	Seifedin Chabbi (to SV Ried)

=== Wolfsberger AC ===
In:

No.	Pos.	Nation	Player
9	FW	AUT	Bernd Gschweidl (from SC Wiener Neustadt)
14	MF	AUT	Florian Flecker (from Kapfenberger SV)
22	MF	AUT	Dominik Frieser (from Kapfenberger SV)

Out:

No.	Pos.	Nation	Player
14	FW	AUT	Philipp Prosenik (loan return to SK Rapid Wien)
17	FW	SVN	Tadej Trdina (to USV Allerheiligen)
23	MF	AUT	Peter Tschernegg (to (Switzerland) FC St. Gallen)

== Austrian Football First League ==
=== SC Austria Lustenau ===
In:

No.	Pos.	Nation	Player
--	MF	AUT	Christopher Drazan (from SKN St. Pölten)
--	MF	AUT	Kürsat Güclü (from First Vienna FC)
1	GK	GER	Alexander Sebald (from (Germany) Kickers Offenbach)
5	DF	BRA	Willian Rodrigues (from (Brazil) Clube Atlético Metropolitano)
6	MF	AUT	Francesco Lovrić (from SV Mattersburg)
7	MF	BRA	Paulo Victor (from (Brazil) Clube Atlético Metropolitano)
8	MF	AUT	Timo Friedrich (from (Germany) FC Rot-Weiß Erfurt U18)
9	FW	BRA	Ronivaldo (from FK Austria Wien II)
10	MF	AUT	Sandro Djurić (from SC Wiener Neustadt)
11	FW	BRA	Gabryel (from (Brazil) Atlético Clube Goianiense)
13	DF	AUT	Christoph Kobleder (from FC Wacker Innsbruck)
15	DF	AUT	Martin Grasegger (from SKN St. Pölten)
16	MF	GER	Pius Dorn (from (Germany) SC Freiburg II)
19	DF	SRB	Bojan Avramović (from SC Rheindorf Altach II)
21	FW	AUT	Petar Pavlović (from (Switzerland) FC St. Gallen II)
23	DF	AUT	Michael Lang (from USV Allerheiligen)

Out:

No.	Pos.	Nation	Player
1	GK	AUT	Christopher Knett (from FC Wacker Innsbruck)
5	DF	AUT	Christoph Stückler (to SC Röthis)
8	FW	BRA	Bruno (to LASK Linz)
9	FW	AUT	Valentin Grubeck (to FC Pasching)
10	MF	GER	Julian Wießmeier (to SV Ried)
16	DF	AUT	Peter Haring (to SV Ried)
22	DF	AUT	Marco Stark (from FK Austria Wien II)
23	MF	AUT	Pius Grabher (to SV Ried)
24	MF	AUT	Mario Bolter (to SC Röthis)
33	MF	GER	İlkay Durmuş (to SV Ried)

=== FC Blau-Weiß Linz ===
In:

No.	Pos.	Nation	Player
--	FW	AUT	Samuel Oppong (on loan from SK Rapid Wien II)
8	FW	AUT	Florian Templ (from SV Mattersburg)
11	MF	AUT	Patrick Schagerl (from Kapfenberger SV)
19	MF	AUT	Manuel Hartl (from SKN St. Pölten)
25	MF	AUT	Manuel Krainz (from USK Anif)
27	DF	AUT	Lukas Skrivanek (on loan from SK Sturm Graz)

Out:

No.	Pos.	Nation	Player
6	FW	AUT	Christian Falk (to ASK Voitsberg)
7	MF	AUT	Rene Renner (to SV Mattersburg)
8	MF	AUT	Damir Mehmedovic (to SKN St. Pölten)
27	MF	AUT	Thomas Goiginger (to LASK Linz)

=== Floridsdorfer AC ===
In:

No.	Pos.	Nation	Player
3	DF	AUT	Stefan Umjenovic (from SC Rheindorf Altach)
12	DF	AUT	Marc Ortner (from SV Mattersburg II)
17	FW	AUT	Bernhard Fucik (from SK Austria Klagenfurt)
18	MF	AUT	Albin Gashi (on loan from SK Rapid Wien II)

Out:

No.	Pos.	Nation	Player
9	FW	AUT	Thomas Hirschhofer (to SK Austria Klagenfurt)
14	MF	SLE	George Davies (loan return to (Germany) SpVgg Greuther Fürth)
22	MF	GER	David Danko (to (Germany) Berliner AK 07)
31	GK	AUT	Alexander Schlager (loan return to FC Liefering)

=== TSV Hartberg ===
In:

No.	Pos.	Nation	Player
3	DF	AUT	Stefan Meusburger (from Kapfenberger SV)
11	FW	AUT	Marcel Holzer (from Wolfsberger AC)
19	MF	AUT	Sven Sprangler (from SV Mattersburg)
20	MF	AUT	Manfred Fischer (from SC Wiener Neustadt)
27	MF	BFA	Zakaria Sanogo (from Wolfsberger AC)
40	DF	AUT	Maximilian Mayer (from FC Liefering)
43	FW	AUT	Georg Rabl (from SC Fürstenfeld)

Out:

No.	Pos.	Nation	Player
11	MF	AUT	Can Kisa (to SV Lafnitz)
15	FW	AUT	Marco Hödl (to USK Anif)
43	FW	AUT	Can Kisa (to SV Lafnitz)

=== Kapfenberger SV ===
In:

No.	Pos.	Nation	Player
4	DF	BIH	Mladen Jutrić (from SV Grödig)
5	DF	CRO	Ivan Grabovac (from (Croatia) NK Stupnik)
7	DF	AUT	Daniel Rosenbichler (from FC Admira Wacker Mödling Amateure)
11	MF	AUT	Benjamin Rosenberger (from SK Sturm Graz)
13	MF	CRO	Davor Bratić (from SC Weiz)
21	FW	AUT	Philipp Plank (from SC Ritzing)
22	MF	CRO	Brajan Grgić (from SK Sturm Graz II)
25	FW	ESP	David Agudo (from (Spain) UD Melilla)
31	DF	AUT	Tobias Kainz (from (Republic of Ireland) Limerick F.C.)

Out:

No.	Pos.	Nation	Player
10	MF	AUT	Dominik Frieser (to Wolfsberger AC)
11	MF	AUT	Patrick Schagerl (to FC Blau-Weiß Linz)
14	MF	AUT	Florian Flecker (to Wolfsberger AC)
18	DF	AUT	Stefan Meusburger (to TSV Hartberg)

=== FC Liefering ===
In:

No.	Pos.	Nation	Player
--	MF	BRA	Rodrigo (on loan from Red Bull Brasil)
--	FW	BRA	Vitinho (on loan from Red Bull Brasil)
27	DF	FRA	Mahamadou Dembélé (on loan from FC Red Bull Salzburg)

Out:

No.	Pos.	Nation	Player
--	MF	AUT	Thomas Mayer (on loan to SV Ried)
9	FW	JPN	Masaya Okugawa (on loan to SV Mattersburg)
13	MF	AUT	Michael Brandner (to SC Wiener Neustadt)
15	MF	AUT	Oliver Filip (to SK Sturm Graz)
22	DF	AUT	Sandro Ingolitsch (to SKN St. Pölten)
31	FW	AUT	Lorenz Grabovac (to SKN St. Pölten)
34	GK	AUT	Alexander Schlager (to LASK Linz)

=== SV Ried ===
In:

No.	Pos.	Nation	Player
--	DF	BIH	Mijo Miletic (from (Bosnia and Herzegovina) FK Sarajevo U19)
5	DF	AUT	Peter Haring (from SC Austria Lustenau)
7	MF	SUI	Gabriel Lüchinger (from SC Rheindorf Altach)
9	FW	AUT	Seifedin Chabbi (from SK Sturm Graz)
10	MF	GER	Julian Wießmeier (from SC Austria Lustenau)
11	MF	AUT	Thomas Mayer (on loan from FC Liefering)
13	MF	AUT	Manuel Kerhe (from LASK Linz)
14	DF	GHA	Kennedy Boateng (on loan from LASK Linz)
15	MF	AUT	Marko Stanković (from SK Sturm Graz)
18	DF	AUT	Christian Schilling (from SC Rheindorf Altach)
23	MF	AUT	Pius Grabher (from SC Austria Lustenau)
29	MF	GER	İlkay Durmuş (from SC Austria Lustenau)
31	DF	AUT	Balakiyem Takougnadi (from SV Horn)

Out:

No.	Pos.	Nation	Player
6	DF	TUR	Özgür Özdemir (to (Germany) SG Sonnenhof Großaspach)
8	MF	AUT	Gernot Trauner (to LASK Linz)
10	MF	AUT	Peter Žulj (to SK Sturm Graz)
11	MF	AUT	Mathias Honsak (loan return to FC Liefering)
12	DF	AUT	Florian Hart (to SV Mattersburg)
13	MF	AUT	Michael Brandner (loan return to FC Liefering)
15	DF	GER	Dennis Chessa (to (Germany) KFC Uerdingen 05)
17	FW	AUT	Marvin Egho (to (Slovakia) FC Spartak Trnava)
18	MF	AUT	Albin Ramadani (to FC Pasching)
20	MF	AUT	Dieter Elsneg (to ASK Voitsberg)
22	FW	AUT	Fabian Schubert (to SK Sturm Graz)
24	DF	ESP	Alberto Prada (to SC Wiener Neustadt)
25	MF	AUT	Patrick Möschl (to (Germany) Dynamo Dresden)

=== FC Wacker Innsbruck ===
In:

No.	Pos.	Nation	Player
1	GK	AUT	Christopher Knett (from SC Austria Lustenau)
9	FW	SVN	Zlatko Dedic (from (Germany) SC Paderborn 07)
10	MF	AUT	Stefan Rakowitz (from SC Wiener Neustadt)
11	FW	AUT	Martin Harrer (from SC Rheindorf Altach)
13	DF	AUT	Matthias Maak (from (Denmark) SønderjyskE Fodbold)
21	FW	GER	Daniele Gabriele (from (Germany) VfB Stuttgart II)
27	DF	AUT	Albert Vallci (from SV Horn)

Out:

No.	Pos.	Nation	Player
1	GK	AUT	Pascal Grünwald (to WSG Wattens)
6	DF	AUT	Christoph Kobleder (to SC Austria Lustenau)
8	MF	AUT	Andreas Hölzl (to FC Kitzbühel)
9	FW	AUT	Thomas Pichlmann (to SC Schwaz)
19	FW	SVN	Patrik Eler (to (France) AS Nancy)
21	FW	AUT	Alexander Gründler (to SC Wiener Neustadt)
22	FW	AUT	Marco Hesina (to FC Kufstein)
23	MF	AUT	Felipe Dorta (loan return to FC Pasching)
27	GK	AUT	Julian Weiskopf (to FC Kufstein)
90	MF	SUI	Claudio Holenstein (to (Switzerland) SC Brühl)

=== WSG Wattens ===
In:

No.	Pos.	Nation	Player
1	GK	AUT	Pascal Grünwald (from FC Wacker Innsbruck)
9	FW	AUT	Sebastian Santin (on loan from FC Hard)
14	MF	AUT	Daniel Strickner (from FG Schönwies/Mils)
23	MF	CRO	Dino Kovačec (from SK Rapid Wien II)
28	DF	ITA	Stefano Pellizzari (on loan from (Italy) Juventus FC)
29	FW	AUT	Simon Zangerl (from (Spain) CD Atlético Baleares)

Out:

No.	Pos.	Nation	Player
14	FW	AUT	Samuel Krismer (to SC Imst)
44	GK	AUT	Lucas Bundschuh (to (Germany) FC Memmingen)

=== SC Wiener Neustadt ===
In:

No.	Pos.	Nation	Player
4	MF	AUT	Michael Brandner (from FC Liefering)
5	MF	AUT	Dejan Ljubicic (on loan from SK Rapid Wien II)
8	MF	AUT	Ivan Ljubic (on loan from SK Sturm Graz)
9	FW	AUT	Alexander Gründler (from FC Wacker Innsbruck)
10	MF	AUT	Fabian Miesenböck (from LASK Linz)
14	DF	ESP	Alberto Prada (from SV Ried)
18	FW	ALB	Hamdi Salihi (from (Albania) KF Skënderbeu Korçë)
20	DF	AUT	Christoph Kobald (from SC Ritzing)
21	DF	AUT	Philipp Seidl (on loan from SK Sturm Graz II)
23	MF	AUT	David Cancola (on loan from Austria Wien)
26	GK	AUT	Dominik Braunsteiner (from SC Wiener Viktoria)
28	DF	AUT	Mustafa Yavuz (from FC Admira Wacker Mödling II)
30	MF	GER	Felix Beiersdorf (on loan from (Germany) RB Leipzig II)
33	FW	AUT	Nikola Zivotic (on loan from SC Rheindorf Altach)

Out:

No.	Pos.	Nation	Player
8	MF	AUT	Sandro Djurić (to SC Austria Lustenau)
9	FW	AUT	Bernd Gschweidl (to Wolfsberger AC)
10	MF	AUT	Stefan Rakowitz (to FC Wacker Innsbruck)
16	DF	AUT	Andreas Schicker (to SC Bruck/Mur)
17	FW	AUT	Lukas Fridrikas (on loan to SC-ESV Parndorf 1919)
18	MF	AUT	Florian Sittsam (to SV Mattersburg)
20	MF	AUT	Manfred Fischer (to TSV Hartberg)
29	DF	AUT	Philipp Hütter (to SK Austria Klagenfurt)
31	FW	AUT	Robin Freiberger (to FC Marchfeld Mannsdorf)

== See also ==
- 2017–18 Austrian Football Bundesliga
- 2017–18 Austrian Football First League
