= List of Austrian football transfers summer 2019 =

This is a list of Austrian football transfers for the 2019 summer transfer window. Only transfers featuring Austrian Football Bundesliga are listed.

== Austrian Football Bundesliga ==
Note: Flags indicate national team as has been defined under FIFA eligibility rules. Players may hold more than one non-FIFA nationality.

=== Red Bull Salzburg ===
In:

No.	Pos.	Nation	Player
43	DF	DEN	Rasmus Kristensen (from (Netherlands) Ajax)
—	FW	SVN	Benjamin Šeško (from (Slovenia) Domžale youth)
—	DF	SUI	Bryan Okoh (from (Switzerland) Lausanne-Sport youth)
—	MF	DEN	Maurits Kjærgaard (from (Denmark) Lyngby youth)
—	MF	BRA	Luis Phelipe (from (Brazil) Red Bull Bragantino)

Out:

No.	Pos.	Nation	Player
9	FW	ISR	Munas Dabbur (to (Spain) Sevilla)
13	MF	AUT	Hannes Wolf (to (Germany) RB Leipzig)
21	FW	NOR	Fredrik Gulbrandsen (to (Turkey) İstanbul Başakşehir)
22	DF	AUT	Stefan Lainer (to (Germany) Borussia Mönchengladbach)
24	MF	AUT	Christoph Leitgeb (to Sturm Graz)
42	MF	AUT	Xaver Schlager (to (Germany) VfL Wolfsburg)
55	DF	BIH	Darko Todorović (on loan to (Germany) Holstein Kiel)
—	MF	MLI	Ousmane Diakité (on loan to SCR Altach, previously on loan at Liefering)
—	DF	BRA	Igor (to (Italy) SPAL, previously on loan at Austria Wien)
—	DF	DEN	Asger Sørensen (to (Germany) 1. FC Nürnberg, previously on loan at (Germany) Jahn Regensburg)
—	MF	GHA	David Atanga (to (Germany) Holstein Kiel, previously on loan at (Germany) Greuther Fürth)
—	MF	AUT	Mathias Honsak (to (Germany) Darmstadt 98, previously on loan at (Germany) Holstein Kiel)
—	FW	SVN	Benjamin Šeško (on loan to Liefering)
—	DF	SUI	Bryan Okoh (on loan to Liefering)
—	MF	DEN	Maurits Kjærgaard (on loan to Liefering)
—	MF	BRA	Luis Phelipe (on loan to Liefering)

=== LASK ===
In:

No.	Pos.	Nation	Player
7	MF	AUT	Rene Renner (from SV Mattersburg)
17	DF	AUT	David Schnegg (from Liefering)
19	MF	AUT	Valentino Müller (from SCR Altach)
22	MF	KOR	Oh In-pyo (from (South Korea) Ulsan Hyundai, previously on loan)
33	FW	AUT	Thomas Sabitzer (from Kapfenberger SV)
—	MF	GER	Daniel Jelisić (from (Germany) Bayern Munich II)
—	DF	GER	Andriko Smolinski (from (Germany) Schalke 04 youth)
—	DF	GER	Jan Boller (from (Germany) Bayer 04 Leverkusen)

Out:

No.	Pos.	Nation	Player
7	MF	AUT	Florian Jamnig (to SCR Altach)
13	DF	AUT	Maximilian Ullmann (to Rapid Wien)
29	FW	BRA	João Victor (to (Germany) VfL Wolfsburg)
—	FW	BRA	Bruno (to (Greece) Olympiacos, previously on loan at (Greece) Atromitos)
—	MF	TUR	Doğan Erdoğan (to (Turkey) Trabzonspor, previously on loan at Juniors OÖ)
—	MF	GHA	Reuben Acquah (to SV Ried, previously on loan at TSV Hartberg)
—	MF	AUT	Markus Blutsch (to ASKÖ Oedt, previously on loan at Blau-Weiß Linz)
—	DF	SRB	Dušan Joković (to (Croatia) Lokomotiva, previously on loan at (Croatia) Sesvete)
—	DF	AUT	Felix Luckeneder (on loan to TSV Hartberg, previously on loan at SCR Altach)
—	MF	JAM	Kyle Butler (to Austria Lustenau, previously on loan at Juniors OÖ)
—	DF	GHA	Kennedy Boateng (to SV Ried, previously on loan)
—	GK	AUT	Nicolas Schmid (to Blau-Weiß Linz, previously on loan)
—	MF	GER	Daniel Jelisić (on loan to Juniors OÖ)
—	DF	GER	Andriko Smolinski (on loan to Juniors OÖ)
—	DF	GER	Jan Boller (on loan to Juniors OÖ)

=== Wolfsberger AC ===
In:

No.	Pos.	Nation	Player
5	DF	AUT	Stefan Perić (from Wacker Innsbruck)
9	FW	ISR	Shon Weissman (from (Israel) Maccabi Haifa)
13	FW	AUT	Alexander Schmidt (on loan from Liefering)
21	MF	CIV	Anderson Niangbo (on loan from Liefering)
29	GK	AUT	Manuel Kuttin (from Admira Wacker)

Out:

No.	Pos.	Nation	Player
9	FW	AUT	Bernd Gschweidl (to SCR Altach)
22	FW	MLI	Sékou Koïta (loan return to Liefering)
28	FW	AUT	Kevin Friesenbichler (loan return to Austria Wien)
29	MF	AUT	Gerald Nutz (to Grazer AK)

=== Austria Wien ===
In:

No.	Pos.	Nation	Player
3	DF	GNB	Maudo Jarjué (from (Azerbaijan) Sabail)
8	DF	AUT	Stephan Zwierschitz (from Admira Wacker)
11	MF	AUT	Benedikt Pichler (from Austria Klagenfurt)
22	DF	NED	Caner Cavlan (from (Netherlands) FC Emmen)
46	DF	AUT	Johannes Handl (from Wacker Innsbruck II)

Out:

No.	Pos.	Nation	Player
3	DF	BRA	Igor (loan return to Red Bull Salzburg)
8	MF	SRB	Uroš Matić (loan return to (Denmark) Copenhagen)
23	DF	CHI	Cristián Cuevas (loan return to (Chile) Huachipato)
25	DF	AUT	Thomas Salamon (to SV Horn)
—	DF	GHA	Mohammed Kadiri (to (Ukraine) Dynamo Kyiv, previously on loan at (Russia) Arsenal Tula)
—	FW	AUT	Kevin Friesenbichler (to (Germany) VfL Osnabrück, previously on loan at Wolfsberger AC)
—	DF	AUT	Michael Blauensteiner (on loan to (Lithuania) Sūduva, previously on loan at TSV Hartberg)

=== Sturm Graz ===
In:

No.	Pos.	Nation	Player
8	DF	AUT	Emanuel Sakic (from (Greece) Atromitos)
9	FW	ALB	Bekim Balaj (from (Russia) Akhmat Grozny)
24	MF	AUT	Christoph Leitgeb (from Red Bull Salzburg)
29	MF	AUT	Thorsten Röcher (on loan from (Germany) FC Ingolstadt 04)

Out:

No.	Pos.	Nation	Player
8	MF	AUT	Sandi Lovrić (to (Switzerland) Lugano)
11	FW	AUT	Lukas Grozurek (on loan to (Germany) Karlsruher SC)
17	DF	GHA	Gideon Mensah (loan return to Liefering)
21	MF	AUT	Lukas Fadinger (on loan to SV Lafnitz)
29	FW	AUT	Arnel Jakupović (loan return to (Italy) Empoli)
—	MF	AUT	Lukas Skrivanek (to Kapfenberger SV, previously on loan)
—	MF	AUT	Oliver Filip (to Blau-Weiß Linz, previously on loan at WSG Wattens)
—	DF	POR	Filipe Ferreira (to (Portugal) Tondela, previously on loan at (Portugal) Nacional)
—	GK	AUT	Fabian Ehmann (to (Greece) Aris, previously on loan at Kapfenberger SV)

=== SKN St. Pölten ===
In:

No.	Pos.	Nation	Player

Out:

No.	Pos.	Nation	Player
9	FW	GRE	Taxiarchis Fountas (to Rapid Wien)
18	MF	CRO	Roko Mišlov (to (Poland) Miedź Legnica)
27	MF	MKD	Eldis Bajrami (released)

=== Rapid Wien ===
In:

No.	Pos.	Nation	Player
9	FW	GRE	Taxiarchis Fountas (from SKN St. Pölten)
13	MF	AUT	Thorsten Schick (from (Switzerland) Young Boys)
31	DF	AUT	Maximilian Ullmann (from LASK)
32	FW	JPN	Koya Kitagawa (from (Japan) Shimizu S-Pulse)

Out:

No.	Pos.	Nation	Player
5	DF	BEL	Boli Bolingoli-Mbombo (to (Scotland) Celtic)
22	FW	SRB	Andrija Pavlović (on loan to (Cyprus) APOEL)
23	DF	AUT	Manuel Thurnwald (to SCR Altach)
26	MF	CRO	Ivan Močinić (released)
29	FW	AUT	Deni Alar (on loan to (Bulgaria) Levski Sofia)
97	FW	ROU	Andrei Ivan (loan return to (Russia) Krasnodar)
—	FW	AUT	Alex Sobczyk (to (Slovakia) Spartak Trnava, previously on loan at Floridsdorfer AC)
—	MF	AUT	Albin Gashi (to Floridsdorfer AC, previously on loan at SV Horn)

=== SV Mattersburg ===
In:

No.	Pos.	Nation	Player
7	MF	AUT	Fabian Miesenböck (from (Slovakia) Spartak Trnava)

Out:

No.	Pos.	Nation	Player
5	DF	ESP	César Ortiz (to (Spain) Toledo)
16	MF	AUT	Mario Grgić (released)
17	MF	AUT	Rene Renner (to LASK)
20	MF	AUT	Michael Perlak (to Wiener Neustadt)
27	FW	AUT	Philipp Prosenik (to Floridsdorfer AC)
—	FW	ESP	Jefté Betancor (to SV Ried, previously on loan at Vorwärts Steyr)

=== SCR Altach ===
In:

No.	Pos.	Nation	Player
6	DF	AUT	Philipp Schmiedl (from Juniors OÖ)
8	MF	AUT	Matthias Puschl (from Kapfenberger SV)
9	FW	AUT	Bernd Gschweidl (from Wolfsberger AC)
12	MF	MLI	Ousmane Diakité (on loan from Red Bull Salzburg, previously on loan at Liefering)
17	MF	AUT	Florian Jamnig (from LASK)
23	MF	SVN	Aljaž Casar (from (Slovenia) Mura)
26	MF	AUT	Daniel Nussbaumer (from (Germany) VfB Stuttgart II)
27	FW	CMR	Frantz Pangop (free agent)
28	DF	BRA	Anderson (from (Brazil) Audax, previously on loan)
31	DF	AUT	Matthias Maak (from Wacker Innsbruck)
32	GK	AUT	Jakob Odehnal (from FV Austria XIII)
34	DF	AUT	Manuel Thurnwald (from Rapid Wien)

Out:

No.	Pos.	Nation	Player
7	DF	AUT	Andreas Lienhart (to TSV Hartberg)
8	FW	AUT	Adrian Grbić (to (France) Clermont Foot)
12	GK	AUT	Andreas Lukse (to (Germany) 1. FC Nürnberg)
17	MF	AUT	Valentino Müller (to LASK)
21	MF	AUT	Simon Piesinger (to (Denmark) Randers)
22	MF	AUT	Stefan Nutz (to SV Ried)
23	DF	AUT	Benedikt Zech (to (Poland) Pogoń Szczecin)
32	DF	AUT	Felix Luckeneder (loan return to LASK)
—	FW	CMR	Michael Cheukoua (to SV Horn, previously on loan at Wiener Neustadt)
—	FW	TUR	Volkan Akyildiz (to (Turkey) Nazilli Belediyespor, previously on loan at Wiener Neustadt)

=== Admira Wacker Mödling ===
In:

No.	Pos.	Nation	Player
8	MF	AUT	Roman Kerschbaum (from Wacker Innsbruck)
30	GK	AUT	Christoph Haas (from SV Horn)
55	DF	GER	Fabian Menig (from (Germany) Preußen Münster)
—	FW	MNE	Boris Cmiljanić (on loan from (Slovakia) Slovan Bratislava)

Out:

No.	Pos.	Nation	Player
8	DF	AUT	Stephan Zwierschitz (to Austria Wien)
9	FW	AUT	Saša Kalajdžić (to (Germany) VfB Stuttgart)
12	DF	AUT	Lukas Malicsek (on loan to SV Horn)
13	MF	FIN	Pyry Soiri (to (Denmark) Esbjerg)
24	MF	AUT	Marco Hausjell (to SV Horn)
29	GK	AUT	Manuel Kuttin (to Wolfsberger AC)
31	MF	GER	Kolja Pusch (loan return to (Germany) 1. FC Heidenheim)
44	FW	CRO	Marin Jakoliš (to (Croatia) Hajduk Split)

=== TSV Hartberg ===
In:

No.	Pos.	Nation	Player
6	DF	AUT	Andreas Lienhart (from SCR Altach)
10	DF	AUT	Stefan Rakowitz (from Wacker Innsbruck)
11	MF	AUT	Lukas Gabbichler (from SC Weiz)
14	DF	AUT	Christian Klem (from Wacker Innsbruck)
19	MF	CZE	Tomas Ostrak (on loan from (Germany) 1. FC Köln)
20	MF	BEN	Jodel Dossou (from (Liechtenstein) Vaduz)
26	DF	AUT	Patrick Obermüller (on loan from Rapid Wien II)
27	MF	AUT	Lukas Ried (from TSV Hartberg II)
32	DF	AUT	Felix Luckeneder (on loan from LASK, previously on loan at SCR Altach)
42	MF	MLI	Bakary Nimaga (from (Turkey) Hatayspor)

Out:

No.	Pos.	Nation	Player
5	MF	AUT	Florian Sittsam (to SV Horn)
11	FW	MNE	Meris Skenderović (loan return to (Germany) Hoffenheim II)
12	FW	AUT	Fabian Schubert (to Blau-Weiß Linz)
14	MF	AUT	Florian Flecker (to (Germany) Union Berlin)
16	DF	CRO	Christian Ilić (to (Scotland) Motherwell)
17	DF	AUT	Manuel Pfeifer (on loan to Allerheiligen)
19	DF	AUT	Michael Blauensteiner (loan return to Austria Wien)
20	MF	AUT	Sebastian Mann (loan return to Sturm Graz II)
26	MF	MLI	Mohamed Camara (loan return to Liefering)
27	FW	BFA	Zakaria Sanogo (loan return to (Burkina Faso) Rahimo)
45	MF	GHA	Reuben Acquah (loan return to LASK)

=== WSG Wattens ===
In:

No.	Pos.	Nation	Player
14	DF	AUT	Julian Gölles (from Wiener Neustadt)
16	MF	AUT	Florian Rieder (from Wacker Innsbruck)
22	FW	SVN	Zlatko Dedić (from Wacker Innsbruck)
26	DF	AUT	Florian Buchacher (from Wacker Innsbruck)
34	DF	AUT	Stefan Hager (from Wiener Neustadt)
46	MF	AUT	Lukas Grgic (from SV Ried)

Out:

No.	Pos.	Nation	Player

== See also ==
- 2019–20 Austrian Football Bundesliga
