= List of Austrian football transfers summer 2016 =

This is a list of Austrian football transfers in the summer transfer window 2016 by club. Only transfers of the Austrian Football Bundesliga, and Austrian Football First League are included.

== Austrian Football Bundesliga ==
Note: Flags indicate national team as has been defined under FIFA eligibility rules. Players may hold more than one non-FIFA nationality.

=== FC Admira Wacker Mödling ===
In:

No.	Pos.	Nation	Player
1	GK	AUT	Andreas Leitner (loan return from SK Austria Klagenfurt)
2	DF	AUT	Fabio Strauss (from SV Grödig)
17	FW	AUT	Dominik Starkl (from SK Rapid Wien, previously on loan)
40	DF	AUT	Mustafa Yavuz (loan return from SC Wiener Neustadt)
44	MF	CRO	Ante Roguljić (on loan from FC Red Bull Salzburg)

Out:

No.	Pos.	Nation	Player
3	DF	AUT	Christoph Schößwendter (to SK Rapid Wien)
12	MF	AUT	Philipp Malicsek (to SK Rapid Wien)
18	MF	AUT	René Schicker (to SV Stripfing)
28	GK	AUT	Jörg Siebenhandl (to (Germany) Würzburger Kickers)
99	MF	AUT	Peter Žulj (to SV Ried)

=== FK Austria Wien ===
In:

No.	Pos.	Nation	Player
—	MF	AUT	Bernhard Luxbacher (loan return from Floridsdorfer AC)
4	DF	CRO	Petar Filipović (from SV Ried)
7	MF	LBY	Ismael Tajouri (loan return from SC Rheindorf Altach)
14	FW	AUT	Alexander Frank (from FK Austria Wien II)
24	DF	AUT	Alexandar Borković (from FK Austria Wien U18)
95	MF	BRA	Felipe Pires (on loan from (Germany) TSG 1899 Hoffenheim)

Out:

No.	Pos.	Nation	Player
—	MF	AUT	Bernhard Luxbacher (released)
4	DF	MKD	Vanče Šikov (to (Azerbaijan) Neftçi PFK)
7	MF	AUT	Marco Meilinger (to (Denmark) AaB Fodbold)
9	FW	AUT	Kevin Friesenbichler (loan return to (Portugal) S.L. Benfica B)
20	MF	AUT	Alexander Gorgon (released)
22	DF	AUT	Marco Stark (to SC Austria Lustenau)
30	DF	AUT	Fabian Koch (to SK Sturm Graz)

=== SV Mattersburg ===
In:

No.	Pos.	Nation	Player
—	DF	AUT	Francesco Lovrić (from (Germany) VfB Stuttgart II)
7	MF	AUT	Manuel Seidl (from Wolfsberger AC)

Out:

No.	Pos.	Nation	Player
9	FW	AUT	Ingo Klemen (to SV Stripfing)
12	FW	AUT	Karim Onisiwo (to (Germany) 1. FSV Mainz 05)
19	MF	AUT	Manuel Prietl (to (Germany) DSC Arminia Bielefeld)

=== SK Rapid Wien ===
In:

No.	Pos.	Nation	Player
3	DF	AUT	Christoph Schößwendter (from FC Admira Wacker Mödling)
16	MF	AUT	Philipp Malicsek (from FC Admira Wacker Mödling)
23	MF	ISL	Arnór Ingvi Traustason (from (Sweden) IFK Norrköping)
26	MF	CRO	Ivan Močinić (from (Croatia) HNK Rijeka)
34	FW	BRA	Joelinton (on loan from (Germany) TSG 1899 Hoffenheim)
99	FW	AUT	Maximilian Entrup (from Floridsdorfer AC)

Out:

No.	Pos.	Nation	Player
—	FW	AUT	Dominik Starkl (to FC Admira Wacker Mödling, previously on loan)
5	MF	GRE	Athanasios Petsos (to (Germany) SV Werder Bremen)
14	MF	AUT	Florian Kainz (to (Germany) SV Werder Bremen)
23	DF	AUT	Stefan Stangl (to FC Red Bull Salzburg)
33	FW	AUT	Deni Alar (to SK Sturm Graz)
36	DF	AUT	Michael Schimpelsberger (to FC Wacker Innsbruck)
38	FW	AUT	Philipp Prosenik (on loan to Wolfsberger AC)

=== FC Red Bull Salzburg ===
In:

No.	Pos.	Nation	Player
—	MF	GRE	Taxiarchis Fountas (loan return from (Greece) Asteras Tripolis)
9	FW	ISR	Mu'nas Dabbur (from (Switzerland) Grasshopper Club Zürich)
11	MF	GER	Marc Rzatkowski (from (Germany) FC St. Pauli)
21	FW	NOR	Fredrik Gulbrandsen (from (Norway) Molde FK)
23	MF	AUT	Stefan Stangl (from SK Rapid Wien)
36	DF	AUT	Martin Hinteregger (loan return from (Germany) Borussia Mönchengladbach)
45	MF	CRO	Ante Roguljić (loan return from (Croatia) HNK Hajduk Split)
88	MF	MLI	Diadie Samassékou (from FC Liefering)
94	MF	BRA	Wanderson (from (Spain) Getafe CF)

Out:

No.	Pos.	Nation	Player
—	DF	DEN	Peter Ankersen (to (Denmark) F.C. Copenhagen, previously on loan)
—	MF	GRE	Taxiarchis Fountas (to (Greece) Panionios F.C.)
2	DF	GER	Benno Schmitz (to (Germany) RB Leipzig)
8	MF	GUI	Naby Keïta (to (Germany) RB Leipzig)
16	FW	ISR	Omer Damari (loan return to (Germany) RB Leipzig)
20	MF	GHA	David Atanga (on loan to (Germany) 1. FC Heidenheim 1846)
23	MF	GER	Hany Mukhtar (loan return to (Portugal) S.L. Benfica)
45	MF	CRO	Ante Roguljić (on loan to FC Admira Wacker Mödling)

=== SC Rheindorf Altach ===
In:

No.	Pos.	Nation	Player
—	DF	AUT	Emanuel Sakic (from SC Austria Lustenau)
—	FW	AUT	Nikola Zivotic (from FK Austria Wien II)
11	MF	AUT	Nikola Dovedan (on loan from LASK Linz)
24	GK	AUT	Benjamin Ožegović (from FK Austria Wien II)

Out:

No.	Pos.	Nation	Player
11	MF	GER	Felix Roth (to (Germany) SC Freiburg II)
30	MF	LBY	Ismael Tajouri (loan return to FK Austria Wien)

=== SV Ried ===
In:

No.	Pos.	Nation	Player
3	DF	MOZ	Ronny Marcos (on loan from (Germany) SpVgg Greuther Fürth)
6	DF	TUR	Özgür Özdemir (from (Germany) 1. FC Nürnberg II)
10	MF	AUT	Peter Žulj (from FC Admira Wacker Mödling)
15	DF	GER	Dennis Chessa (from (Germany) VfR Aalen)
17	FW	AUT	Marvin Egho (from FC Admira Wacker Mödling)

Out:

No.	Pos.	Nation	Player
5	DF	AUT	Bernhard Janeczek (to (Israel) Maccabi Petah Tikva F.C.)
6	MF	GER	Denis Streker (to (Germany) FSV Frankfurt)
17	DF	CRO	Petar Filipović (to FK Austria Wien)
21	GK	AUT	Markus Schöller (on loan to Union Gurten)
29	FW	AUT	Jakob Kreuzer (to FC Blau-Weiß Linz)

=== SKN St. Pölten ===
In:

No.	Pos.	Nation	Player
—	DF	ROU	Paul Pîrvulescu (from (Romania) FC Steaua București)
5	DF	NED	Kai Heerings (from (Netherlands) SC Cambuur)
9	FW	NED	Kevin Luckassen (from (Czech Republic) FC Slovan Liberec)
11	MF	AUT	Christopher Drazan (from LASK Linz)
20	MF	AUT	Daniel Schütz (from SV Grödig)
27	FW	NED	Jeroen Lumu (from (Netherlands) FC Dordrecht)
32	GK	AUT	Thomas Vollnhofer (from First Vienna FC)

Out:

No.	Pos.	Nation	Player
2	DF	AUT	Mark Prettenthaler (to SC Mannsdorf)
11	MF	SEN	Cheikhou Dieng (to (Turkey) İstanbul Başakşehir F.K.)
18	MF	AUT	Sebastian Starkl (to Kremser SC)
21	FW	AUT	Jannick Schibany (to First Vienna FC)
24	MF	AUT	Andree Neumayer (to SV Würmla)
26	FW	AUT	Oliver Markoutz (to Floridsdorfer AC)
28	DF	AUT	Kurt Starkl (to Kremser SC)
33	FW	AUT	Bernd Gschweidl (to SC Wiener Neustadt)

=== SK Sturm Graz ===
In:

No.	Pos.	Nation	Player
8	MF	SRB	Uroš Matić (from (Netherlands) NAC Breda)
9	FW	AUT	Deni Alar (from SK Rapid Wien)
18	MF	AUT	Philipp Huspek (from SK Rapid Wien)
20	DF	GER	Christian Schulz (from (Germany) Hannover 96)
24	MF	AUT	Marc Andre Schmerböck (loan return from Wolfsberger AC)
25	MF	AUT	Stefan Hierländer (from (Germany) RB Leipzig)
26	DF	AUT	Fabian Koch (from FK Austria Wien)
27	DF	AUT	Lukas Skrivanek (from SK Sturm Graz II)
35	DF	AUT	Dario Maresic (from SK Sturm Graz II)
39	MF	AUT	Romano Schmid (from SK Sturm Graz U18)
40	GK	AUT	Fabian Ehmann (from SK Sturm Graz II)

Out:

No.	Pos.	Nation	Player
—	DF	AUT	Michael Madl (to (England) Fulham F.C., previously on loan)
4	DF	GRE	Tasos Avlonitis (loan return to (Greece) Olympiacos F.C.)
20	MF	AUT	Daniel Offenbacher (to Wolfsberger AC)
21	MF	AUT	Benjamin Rosenberger (on loan to Wolfsberger AC)
26	MF	AUT	David Schnaderbeck (to SV Lebring)
27	DF	AUT	Christian Klem (to Wolfsberger AC)
28	DF	AUT	Tanju Kayhan (to (Turkey) Göztepe SK)
31	GK	GER	Michael Esser (to (Germany) SV Darmstadt 98)
44	MF	AUT	Thorsten Schick (to (Switzerland) BSC Young Boys)
77	MF	ALB	Donis Avdijaj (loan return to (Germany) FC Schalke 04)

=== Wolfsberger AC ===
In:

No.	Pos.	Nation	Player
—	GK	AUT	Raphael Sallinger (from (Germany) 1. FC Kaiserslautern II)
—	MF	AUT	Gerald Nutz (from Kapfenberger SV)
—	FW	AUT	Mihret Topčagić (from SC Rheindorf Altach)
10	MF	AUT	Daniel Offenbacher (from SK Sturm Graz)
21	DF	AUT	Christian Klem (from SK Sturm Graz)
22	MF	AUT	Benjamin Rosenberger (on loan from SK Sturm Graz)
38	FW	AUT	Philipp Prosenik (on loan from SK Rapid Wien)

Out:

No.	Pos.	Nation	Player
22	MF	AUT	Manuel Seidl (to SV Mattersburg)
29	MF	AUT	Marc Andre Schmerböck (loan return to SK Sturm Graz)
33	FW	BFA	Issiaka Ouédraogo (to (United Arab Emirates) Hatta Club)

== Austrian Football First League ==
=== SC Austria Lustenau ===
In:

No.	Pos.	Nation	Player
—	DF	AUT	Marco Stark (from FK Austria Wien)
—	DF	AUT	Alexander Joppich (from FC Liefering)
—	MF	AUT	Stefan Bergmeister (from (Germany) 1. FC Nürnberg II)
—	FW	GHA	Raphael Dwamena (from FC Liefering)
—	FW	AUT	Valentin Grubeck (from SV Grödig)

Out:

No.	Pos.	Nation	Player

=== Floridsdorfer AC ===
In:

No.	Pos.	Nation	Player

Out:

No.	Pos.	Nation	Player
12	MF	AUT	Bernhard Luxbacher (loan return to FK Austria Wien)

=== SV Horn ===
In:

No.	Pos.	Nation	Player

Out:

No.	Pos.	Nation	Player

=== Kapfenberger SV ===
In:

No.	Pos.	Nation	Player
—	DF	SRB	Nemanja Lakić-Pešić (from (Serbia) FK Radnički Niš)

Out:

No.	Pos.	Nation	Player

=== FC Blau-Weiß Linz ===
In:

No.	Pos.	Nation	Player

Out:

No.	Pos.	Nation	Player

=== LASK Linz ===
In:

No.	Pos.	Nation	Player

Out:

No.	Pos.	Nation	Player

=== FC Liefering ===
In:

No.	Pos.	Nation	Player

Out:

No.	Pos.	Nation	Player

=== FC Wacker Innsbruck ===
In:

No.	Pos.	Nation	Player

Out:

No.	Pos.	Nation	Player
—	FW	EST	Henrik Ojamaa (to (Netherlands) Go Ahead Eagles)

=== WSG Wattens ===
In:

No.	Pos.	Nation	Player

Out:

No.	Pos.	Nation	Player

=== SC Wiener Neustadt ===
In:

No.	Pos.	Nation	Player

Out:

No.	Pos.	Nation	Player
24	DF	AUT	Mustafa Yavuz (loan return to FC Admira Wacker Mödling)

== See also ==
- 2016–17 Austrian Football Bundesliga
- 2016–17 Austrian Football First League
