= Gründler =

Gründler is a surname. Notable people with the surname include:

- Alexander Gründler (born 1993), Austrian footballer
- Beatrice Gründler (born 1964), German Arabist
- Hartmut Gründler (1930–1977), German teacher and activist
- Matthias Gründler (born 1965), German businessman
