= Nikola Jelišić =

Bosnian-German footballer

Personal information
- Date of birth: 29 December 1994 (age 31)
- Place of birth: Munich, Germany
- Height: 1.78 m (5 ft 10 in)
- Position: Midfielder

Youth career
- SV Planegg
- –2011: 1860 Munich
- 2011–2013: Bayern Munich

Senior career*
Years	Team	Apps	(Gls)
2012–2015	Bayern Munich II	39	(3)
2016	BV Cloppenburg	10	(1)
2016–2019	1. FC Schweinfurt	75	(6)
2019–2020	Blau-Weiß Linz	8	(2)
2020–2022	FC Pipinsried	44	(2)

International career
2015	Bosnia and Herzegovina U21	4	(1)

Managerial career
- 2022: FC Pipinsried
- * Club domestic league appearances and goals as of 29 October 2022

Nikola Jelišić (born 29 December 1994) is a Bosnian-German former professional footballer.

== Club career ==
Jelišić made his professional debut for Blau-Weiß Linz in the Austrian 2. Liga on 16 August 2019, coming on as a substitute in the 72nd minute for Aleksandar Kostić against Austria Wien II. Seven minutes later, he assisted Martin Kreuzriegler's headed goal to secure a 4–3 home win for Blau-Weiß Linz.

== International career ==
Jelišić received citizenship for Bosnia and Herzegovina in 2015 from the Council of Ministers, and was therefore eligible to represent the country internationally. He made four appearances for the under-21 national team in 2015, and scored one goal.

== Managerial career ==
On 11 October 2022, Jelišić was appointed new head coach of FC Pipinsried after former coach Miljan Prijovic was dismissed. He also continued as a player of the club.

== Personal life ==
Jelišić's younger brother, Daniel, is also a footballer.
