= Damir Mehmedovic =

Austrian footballer (born 1997)

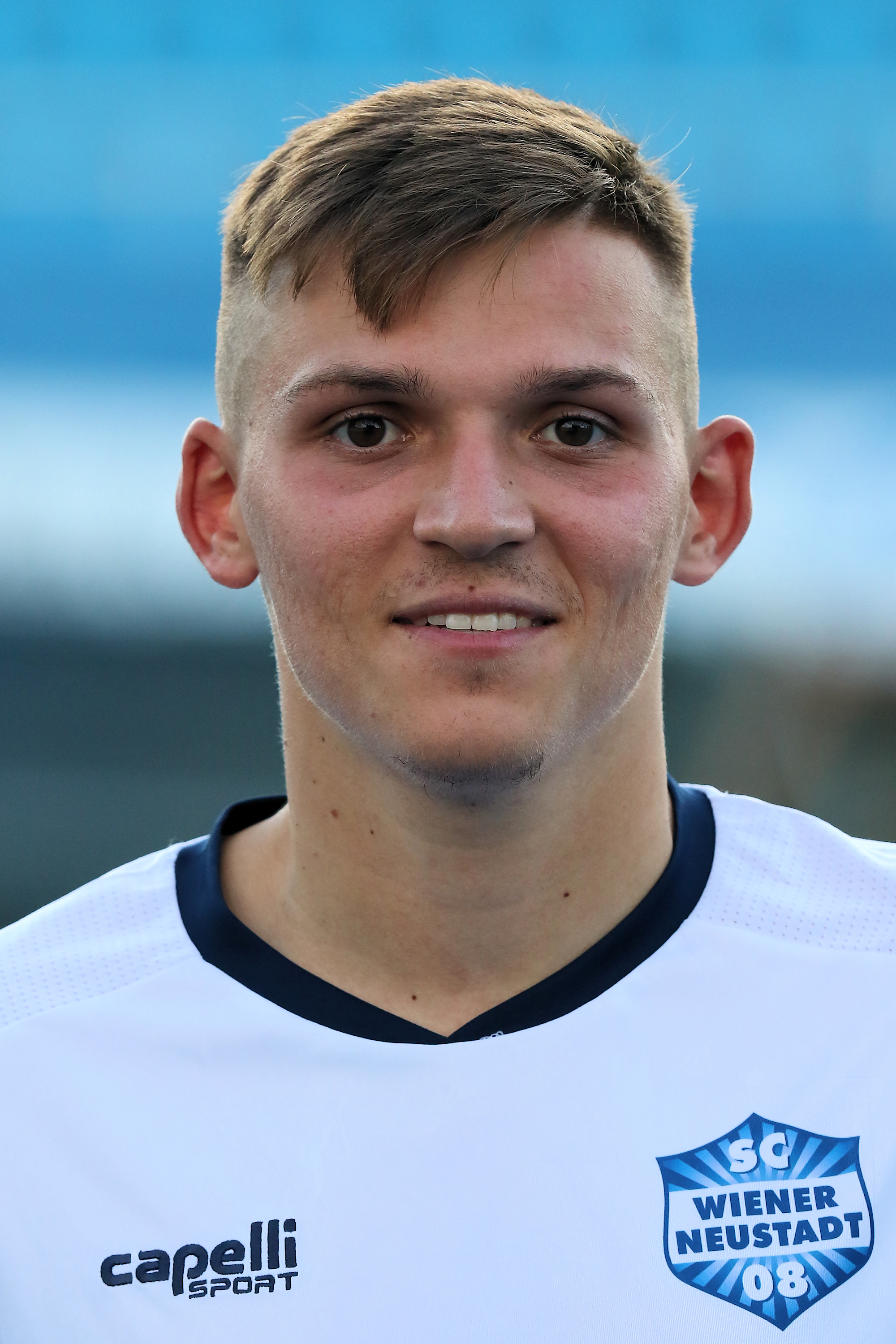

Personal information
- Date of birth: 11 December 1997 (age 28)
- Place of birth: Linz, Austria
- Height: 1.71 m (5 ft 7 in)
- Position: Left-back

Team information
- Current team: FC Marchfeld Donauauen
- Number: 17

Youth career
- 2005–2006: ASKÖ Blaue Elf
- 2006–2007: FC Superfund
- 2007: ASKÖ Blaue Elf
- 2007–2010: Superfund Pasching
- 2010–2012: Red Bull Salzburg
- 2012–2015: Linz

Senior career*
| Years | Team | Apps | (Gls) |
| 2015 | FC Pasching/LASK Juniors | 1 | (0) |
| 2015–2017 | Blau-Weiß Linz | 46 | (3) |
| 2017–2019 | St. Pölten | 15 | (0) |
| 2017–2018 | → St. Pölten II | 16 | (0) |
| 2019 | SV Lafnitz | 7 | (0) |
| 2019–2020 | Wiener Neustadt | 15 | (3) |
| 2020 | Tabor Sežana | 2 | (0) |
| 2020–2022 | 1. FC Lokomotive Leipzig | 41 | (0) |
| 2023–2024 | Kremser SC | 37 | (2) |
| 2024 | Stripfing | 16 | (0) |
| 2025 | Amstetten | 4 | (0) |
| 2025 | Kremser | 14 | (1) |
| 2026– | FC Marchfeld Donauauen | 11 | (0) |
- * Club domestic league appearances and goals as of 12 June 2025

Damir Mehmedovic (born 11 December 1997) is an Austrian footballer who plays as a left-back for FC Marchfeld Donauauen.

== Club career ==
He made his Austrian Football First League debut for FC Blau-Weiß Linz on 5 August 2016 in a game against SC Wiener Neustadt.
