= Paulo Victor (footballer, born 1996) =

Brazilian footballer

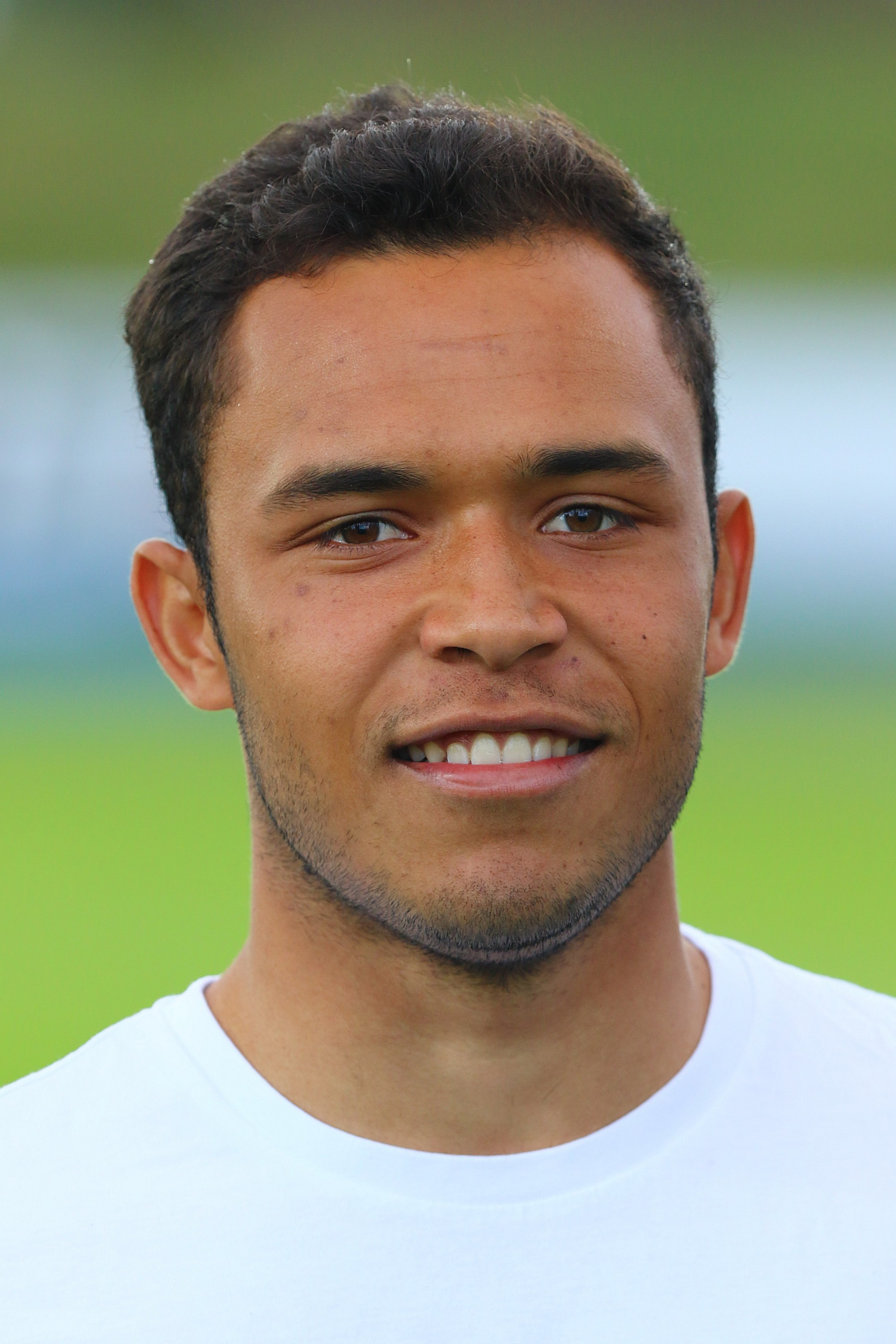

Personal information
- Full name: Paulo Victor Rodrigues de Souza
- Date of birth: 22 March 1996 (age 30)
- Place of birth: Itanhém, Brazil
- Height: 1.74 m (5 ft 8 1/2 in)
- Position: Midfielder

Team information
- Current team: FC Langenegg
- Number: 18

Senior career*
| Years | Team | Apps | (Gls) |
| 2016–2017 | São Caetano B | | |
| 2017 | Metropolitano | 17 | (4) |
| 2017–2018 | Austria Lustenau | 18 | (5) |
| 2018– | FC Langenegg | 29 | (3) |
- * Club domestic league appearances and goals as of 01:14, 25 July 2019 (UTC)

Paulo Victor Rodrigues de Souza, known as Paulo Victor (born 22 March 1996) is a Brazilian football player. He played for FC Langenegg. Currently he plays for FC Lustenau in the 3rd league of Austria.

== Club career ==
He made his Austrian Football First League debut for SC Austria Lustenau on 21 July 2017 in a game against Floridsdorfer AC and scored twice after coming on as a half-time substitute.
