= David Schnaderbeck =

Austrian footballer

Personal information
- Full name: David Schnaderbeck
- Date of birth: 17 March 1992 (age 34)
- Place of birth: Graz, Austria
- Position: Midfielder

Team information
- Current team: SV Lebring

Senior career*
Years	Team	Apps	(Gls)
2010–2016	SK Sturm Graz II	100	(12)
2013–2016	SK Sturm Graz	1	(0)
2016–	SV Lebring	0	(0)
- * Club domestic league appearances and goals as of 10:55, 1 April 2016 (UTC)

David Schnaderbeck (born 17 March 1992) is an Austrian footballer who plays for SV Lebring.
