= Martin Grasegger =

Austrian footballer

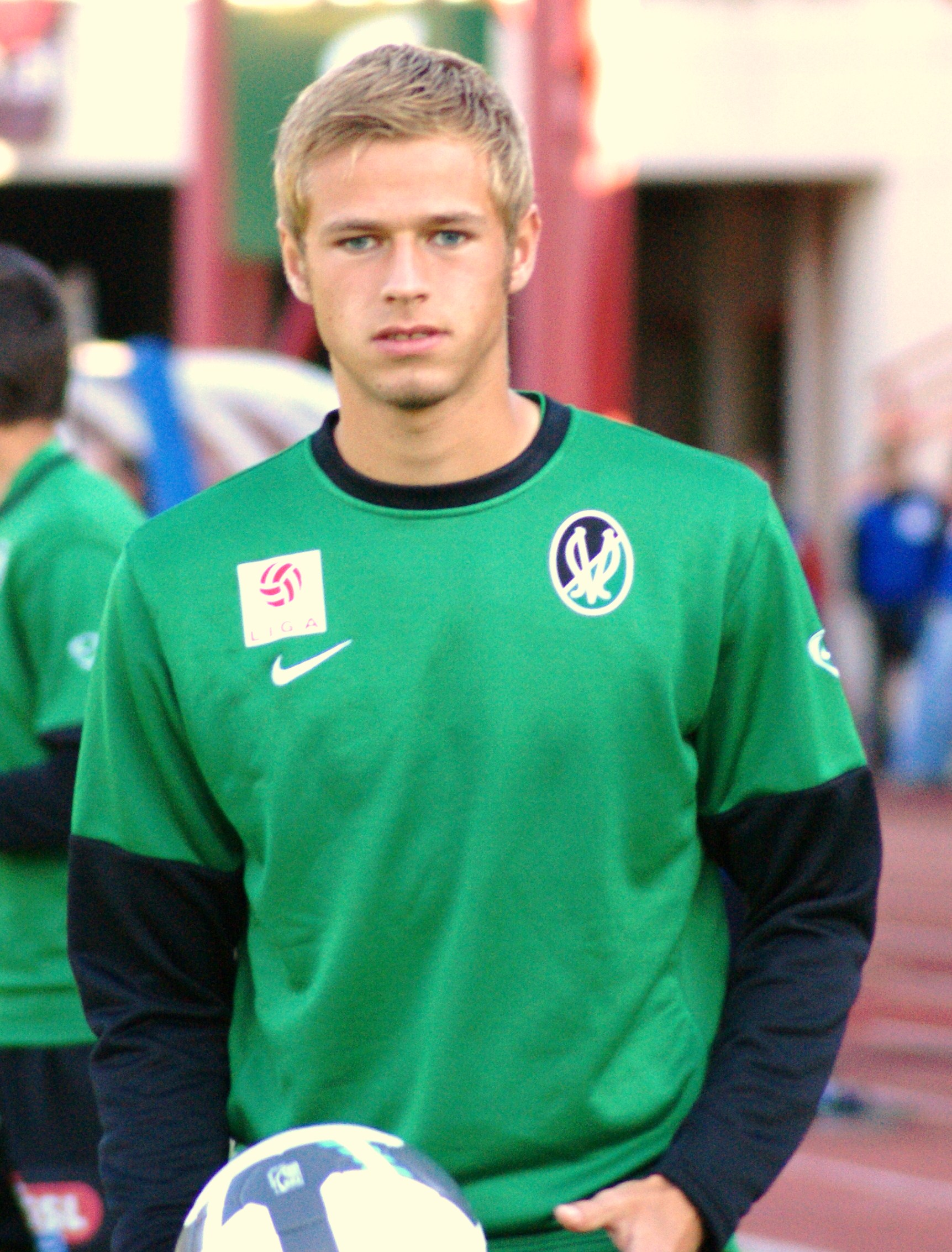

Personal information
- Date of birth: 10 January 1989 (age 37)
- Place of birth: Austria
- Height: 1.80 m (5 ft 11 in)
- Position: Full-back

Team information
- Current team: ASKÖ Oedt

Senior career*
Years	Team	Apps	(Gls)
2008–2012	Ried	25	(0)
2010–2011	→ SV Grödig (loan)	35	(0)
2012–2013	FC Pasching	59	(1)
2014–2017	SKN St. Pölten	95	(1)
2017–2018	Austria Lustenau	30	(0)
2018–2020	Blau-Weiß Linz	48	(1)
2020–2021	SKU Amstetten	16	(1)
2021–	ASKÖ Oedt	2	(0)

International career
	Austria U17	2	(0)
	Austria U18	1	(0)
2007	Austria U19	2	(0)
2009–2010	Austria U20	3	(0)
- * Club domestic league appearances and goals as of 3 September 2021

Martin Grasegger (born 10 January 1989) is an Austrian professional association football player who plays for ASKÖ Oedt in the fourth-tier OÖ Liga.

== Club career ==
On 8 August 2020, he joined SKU Amstetten on a one-season contract.

== Honours ==
Pasching

- Austrian Cup: 2012–13
