= Stefan Bergmeister =

Austrian footballer (born 1996)

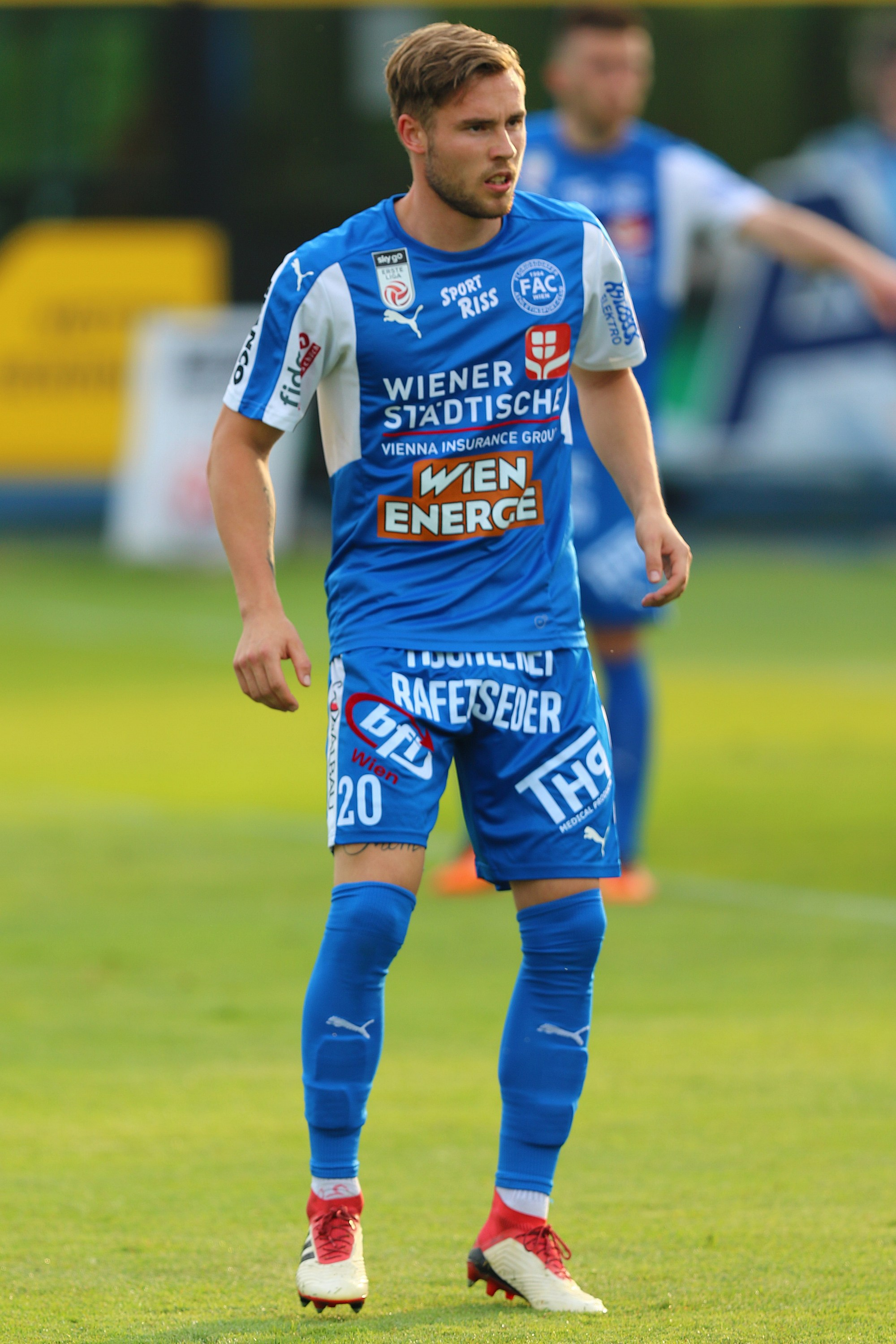
- Bergmeister in 2018

Personal information
- Date of birth: 18 July 1996 (age 30)
- Place of birth: Schwarzach im Pongau, Austria
- Height: 1.74 m (5 ft 8 1/2 in)
- Positions: Defensive midfielder; right back

Team information
- Current team: FC Kitzbühel
- Number: 18

Youth career
- 2002–2007: SV Thiersee
- 2007–2008: FC Kufstein
- 2008–2013: Red Bull Salzburg
- 2013–2015: FC Nürnberg

Senior career*
Years	Team	Apps	(Gls)
2015–2016	FC Nürnberg II	15	(0)
2016–2018	Austria Lustenau	7	(0)
2017–2018	→ Floridsdorfer AC (loan)	22	(0)
2018–2019	FC Kufstein	3	(0)
2019–	FC Kitzbühel	15	(1)

International career
2011	Austria U-16	1	(0)
2012–2013	Austria U-17	4	(0)
- * Club domestic league appearances and goals as of 14:34, 13 November 2019 (UTC)

Stefan Bergmeister (born 18 July 1996) is an Austrian football player. He plays for FC Kitzbühel.

== Club career ==
He made his Austrian Football First League debut for SC Austria Lustenau on 9 September 2016 in a game against SC Wiener Neustadt.
