= Daniel Strickner =

Austrian footballer

Personal information
- Date of birth: 16 April 1997 (age 29)
- Position: Midfielder

Team information
- Current team: SPG Silz/Mötz
- Number: 14

Youth career
- 2005–2006: SC Mils
- 2006–2009: SV Fritzens
- 2009–2014: WSG Wattens

Senior career*
Years	Team	Apps	(Gls)
2014–2017	SC Mils		
2017–2018	WSG Wattens	11	(1)
2018–	SPG Silz/Mötz		
- * Club domestic league appearances and goals as of 22:55, 5 September 2019 (UTC)

Daniel Strickner (born 16 April 1997) is an Austrian football player. He plays for SPG Silz/Mötz.

== Club career ==
He made his Austrian Football First League debut for WSG Wattens on 4 August 2017 in a game against Kapfenberger SV.

SPG Silz/Mötz
