= Maximilian Mayer =

Austrian footballer

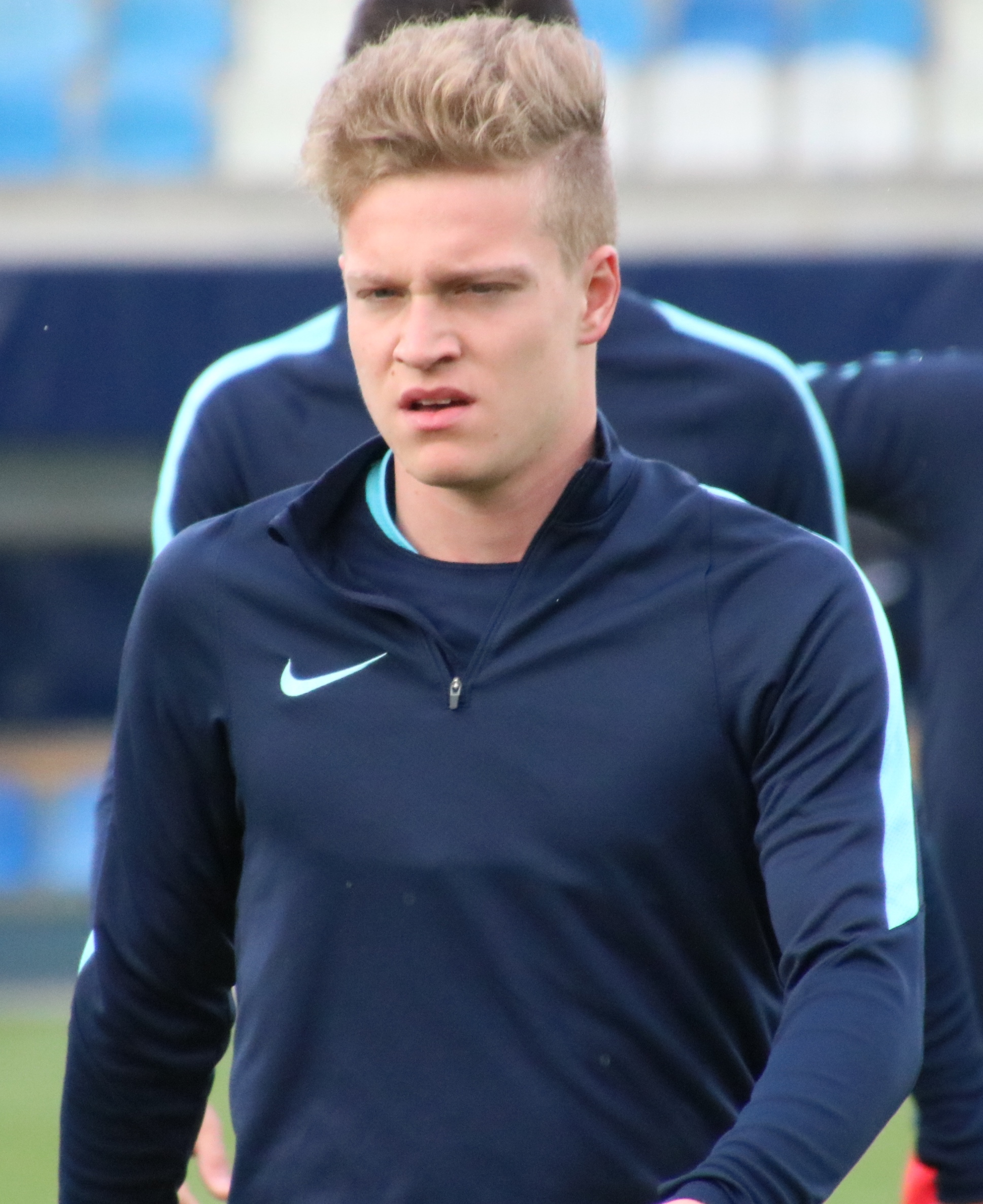
- Mayer with Liefering in 2016

Personal information
- Date of birth: 21 July 1998 (age 28)
- Place of birth: Tulln an der Donau, Austria
- Height: 1.74 m (5 ft 8 1/2 in)
- Position: Right back

Team information
- Current team: Mannsdorf
- Number: 20

Youth career
- 2005–2011: USC Fenster-Mayer Altenwörth
- 2011–2013: AKA St. Pölten
- 2013–2015: FC Red Bull Salzburg

Senior career*
Years	Team	Apps	(Gls)
2016–2017	FC Liefering	13	(0)
2017–2018	TSV Hartberg	2	(0)
2018–2019	Floridsdorfer AC	13	(0)
2019–	Mannsdorf	4	(0)

International career
2015	Austria U17	1	(0)
- * Club domestic league appearances and goals as of 19:19, 13 October 2019 (UTC)

Maximilian Mayer (born 21 July 1998) is an Austrian football player. He plays for FC Mannsdorf-Großenzersdorf.

== Club career ==
He made his Austrian Football First League debut for FC Liefering on 4 March 2016 in a game against Kapfenberger SV.

He won the 2016–17 UEFA Youth League with the Under-19 squad of FC Red Bull Salzburg.
