= Lorenz Grabovac =

Austrian footballer

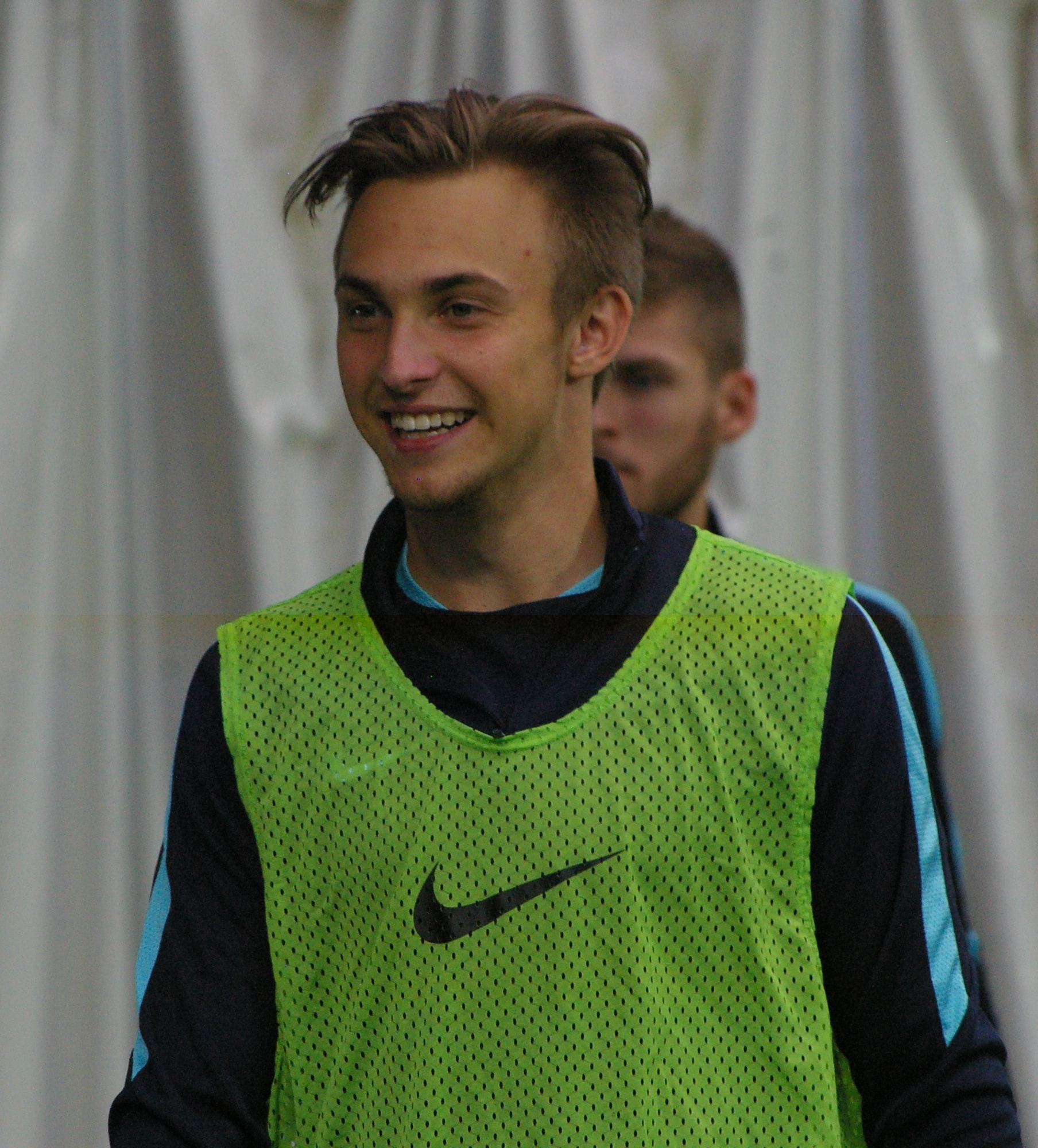
- Grabovac with Liefering in 2015

Personal information
- Date of birth: 25 July 1997 (age 29)
- Place of birth: Zwettl, Austria
- Height: 1.78 m (5 ft 10 in)
- Position: Forward

Team information
- Current team: First Vienna FC

Youth career
- 2003–2015: SC Zwettl
- 2015–2016: Red Bull Salzburg

Senior career*
Years	Team	Apps	(Gls)
2013–2015	SC Zwettl	37	(12)
2015–2017	FC Liefering	30	(4)
2017–2020	SKN St. Pölten	4	(0)
2020–	First Vienna FC	0	(0)

International career^{‡}
2015–2016	Austria U19	5	(1)
- * Club domestic league appearances and goals as of 4 July 2020 ‡ National team caps and goals as of 29 March 2016

Lorenz Grabovac (born 25 July 1997) is an Austrian football player. He plays for First Vienna FC.

== Club career ==
He made his Austrian Football First League debut for FC Liefering on 21 August 2015 in a game against SC Wiener Neustadt.
