= Matthias Gründler =

German businessman

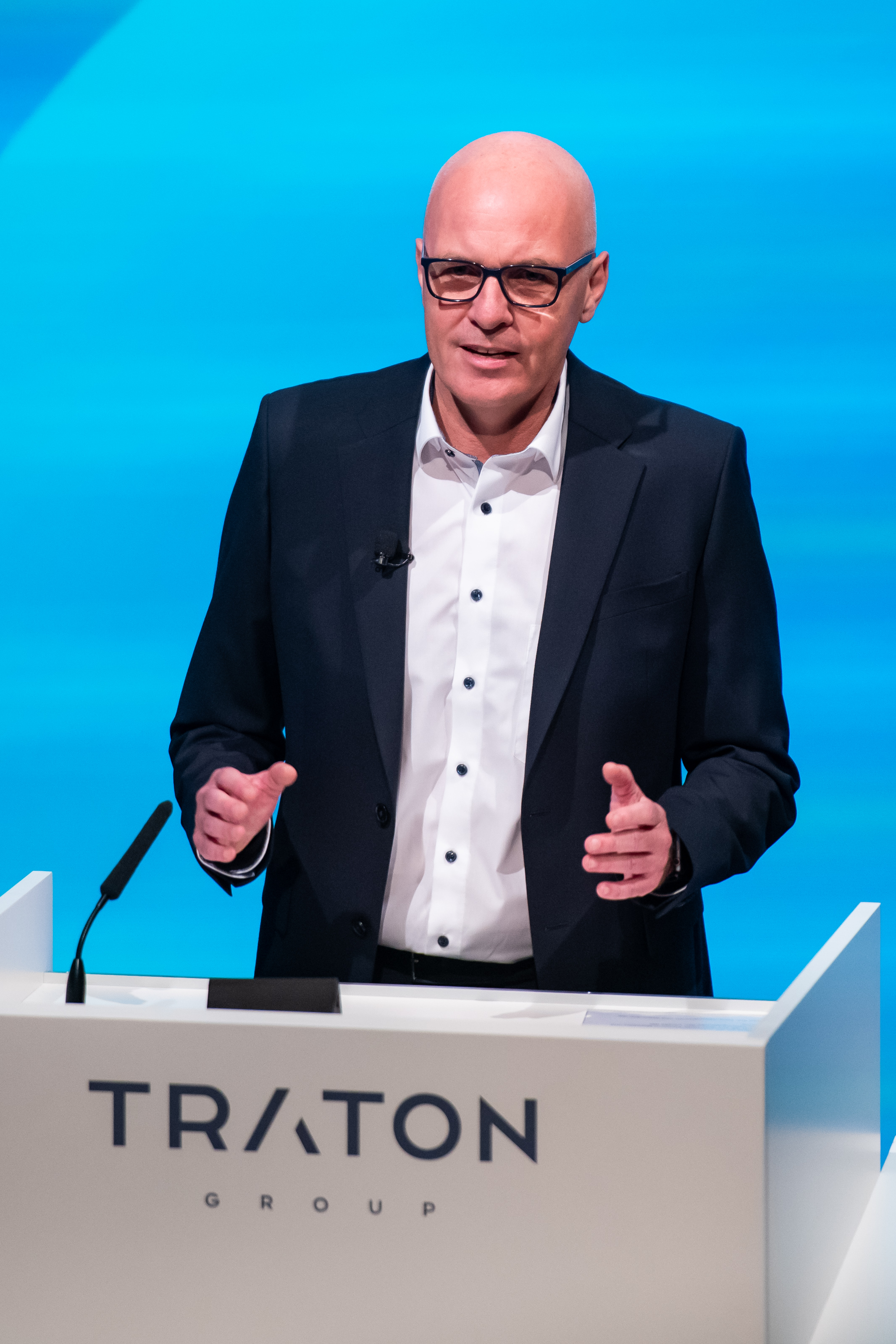
Matthias Gründler at the Annual General Meeting of Traton SE in September 2020

Matthias Gründler (born 16 September 1965, in Stuttgart) is a German businessman. He served as the chief executive officer of Traton SE from June 2020 until October 2021. Previously he was the chief financial officer of the company since May 2018.

== Career ==
Gründler graduated from high school in Stuttgart-Fellbach in 1986. He then completed a three-year apprenticeship as an industrial clerk at Daimler Benz AG, where he joined the production and sales planning department in 1989. In 1993, he took on his first management position in supply chain management at DaimlerChrysler.

After holding various positions for Daimler in Africa and Asia, in 2008 he became Chief Financial Officer of Mitsubishi Fuso Trucks & Bus Corp. based in Japan, a subsidiary of the Daimler Group. From 2011 he was head of procurement and business development Powertrain at Daimler Trucks & Buses. In 2012 he took over the position of CFO.

In 2015 Gründler joined Volkswagen and became CFO of Volkswagen's Truck & Bus division (today Traton). He left the company "at his own request" in May 2018. On July 16, 2020, Gründler took over as CEO of Traton SE. Gründler left the company before the end of his contract on September 30, 2021, and was succeeded by Scania AB CEO, Christian Levin.
