= Christoph Kobleder =

Austrian footballer

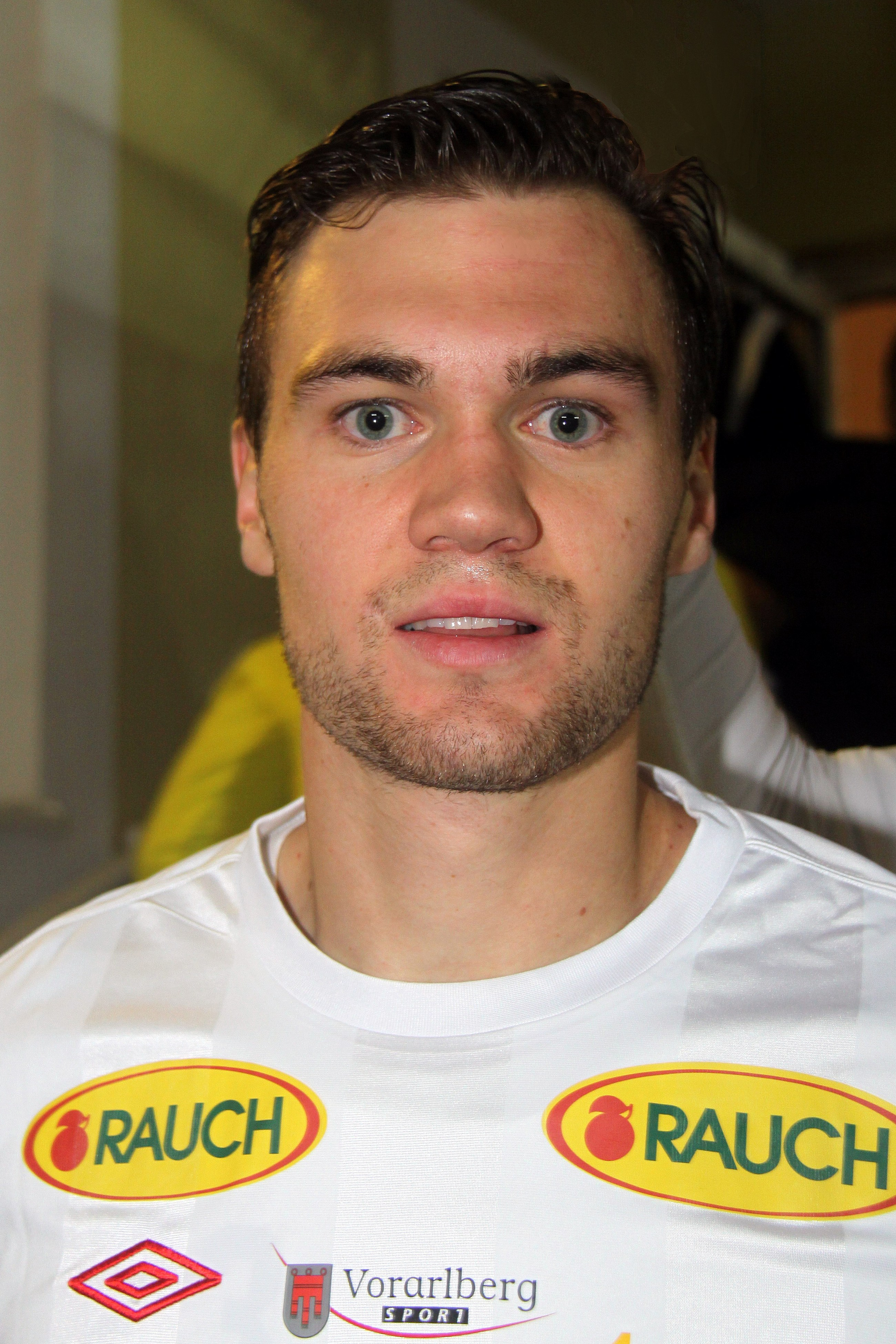

Personal information
- Full name: Christoph Kobleder
- Date of birth: March 3, 1990 (age 36)
- Place of birth: Austria
- Height: 1.85 m (6 ft 1 in)
- Position: Centre back

Team information
- Current team: Bregenz
- Number: 6

Senior career*
Years	Team	Apps	(Gls)
2008–2009	Anif	30	(5)
2009–2013	LASK Linz	50	(7)
2010–2011	→ FC Lustenau 07 (loan)	33	(3)
2013–2015	Austria Lustenau	68	(11)
2015–2016	Wolfsberger AC	0	(0)
2016–2017	Wacker Innsbruck	34	(0)
2017–2018	Austria Lustenau	27	(1)
2019–	Bregenz	13	(1)

International career
2008	Austria U-19	1	(0)
2008	Austria U-20	1	(0)
- * Club domestic league appearances and goals as of 01:18, 25 July 2019 (UTC)

Christoph Kobleder (born March 3, 1990) is an Austrian professional association football player who currently plays for SC Bregenz as a centre back.
