= Stefan Umjenovic =

Austrian footballer

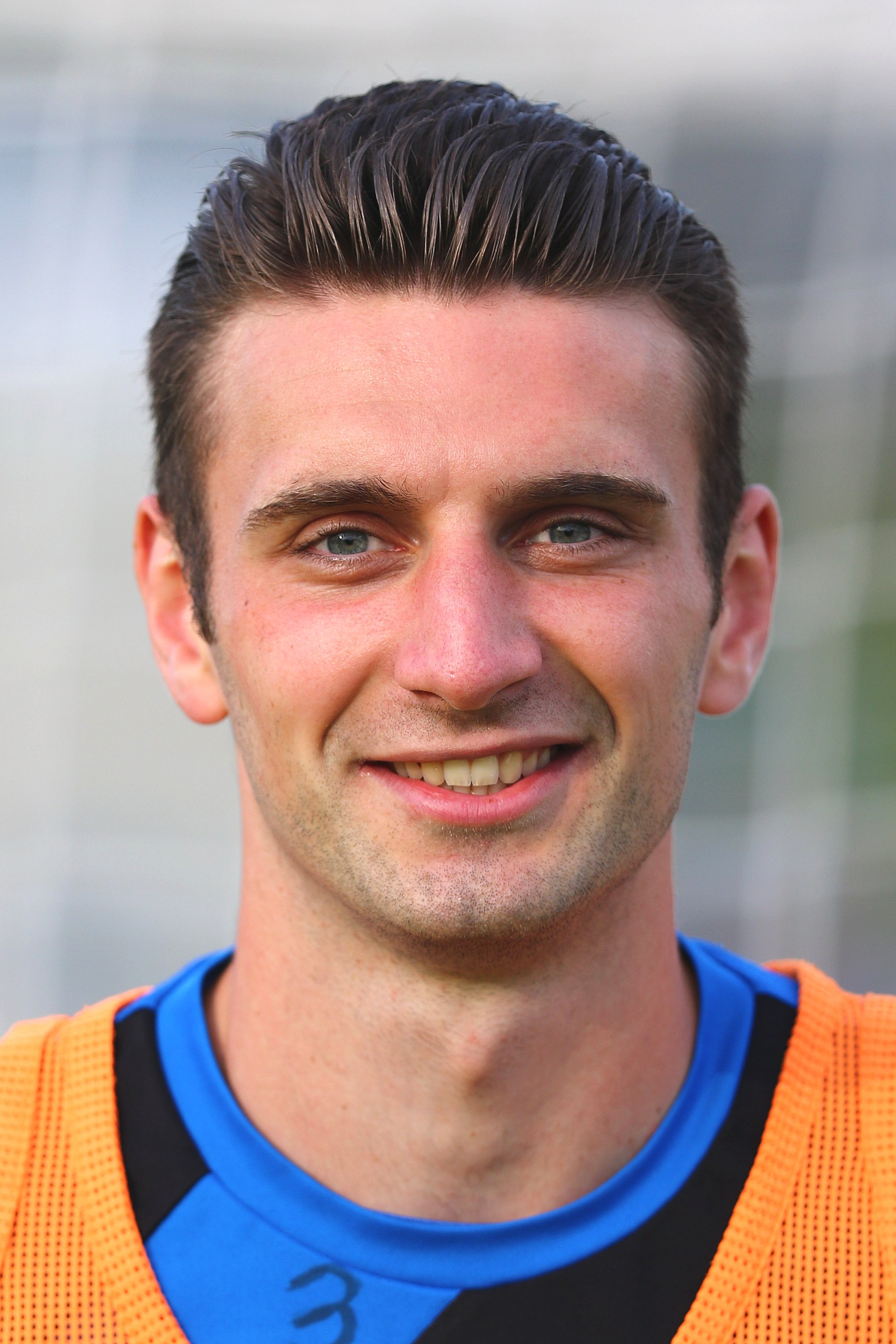
- Umjenovic in 2018

Personal information
- Full name: Stefan Umjenovic
- Date of birth: 11 August 1995 (age 31)
- Place of birth: Austria
- Height: 1.89 m (6 ft 2 in)
- Position: Defensive midfielder

Team information
- Current team: Schwarz-Weiß Bregenz
- Number: 18

Youth career
- 2003–2009: FC Wolfurt
- 2009–2012: AKA Vorarlberg

Senior career*
Years	Team	Apps	(Gls)
2012–2013	Lustenau 07	1	(0)
2013–2017	Rheindorf Altach II	100	(9)
2013–2017	Rheindorf Altach	2	(0)
2017–2019	Floridsdorfer AC	56	(7)
2019	KPV	4	(0)
2020	Floridsdorfer AC	13	(0)
2020–2023	SV Lafnitz	82	(8)
2023–2024	DSV Leoben	8	(1)
2024	FC Dornbirn	15	(3)
2024–	Schwarz-Weiß Bregenz	18	(0)
- * Club domestic league appearances and goals as of 17 May 2026

Stefan Umjenovic (born 11 August 1995) is an Austrian professional footballer who plays for Schwarz-Weiß Bregenz.

== Career ==
=== Club career ===
On 12 August 2019, Umjenovic joined Finnish club Kokkolan Palloveikot on a contract for the rest of the year. He then returned to Floridsdorfer AC in January 2020, before joining SV Lafnitz on 4 August 2020.

On 14 July 2023, Umjenovic signed a contract with Admiral 2nd League side DSV Leoben. In January 2024, he joined FC Dornbirn on a free transfer on a two-and-a-half-year contract.
