= Marc Ortner =

Austrian footballer

Personal information
- Date of birth: 17 March 1998 (age 28)
- Height: 1.78 m (5 ft 10 in)
- Position: Midfielder

Team information
- Current team: Union Mauer
- Number: 6

Youth career
- 2011–2012: ASK Kaltenleutgeben
- 2012: 1. SVg Wiener Neudorf
- 2012–2016: AKA Burgenland

Senior career*
Years	Team	Apps	(Gls)
2016–2017	SV Mattersburg II		
2017–2018	Floridsdorfer AC	5	(0)
2018–2019	Austria Klagenfurt	35	(0)
2020	ATSV Wolfsberg	1	(1)
2020–2021	Spittal/Drau	26	(1)
2022–2023	Marchfeld	36	(0)
2023	Korneuburg	15	(1)
2024	FavAC	14	(1)
2024–2025	SV Gloggnitz	25	(0)
2025–	Union Mauer	16	(1)

International career
2016	Austria U-18	2	(0)
2016–2017	Austria U-19	4	(0)
- * Club domestic league appearances and goals as of 28 June 2026

Marc Ortner (born 17 March 1998) is an Austrian football player. He plays for Union Mauer.

== Club career ==
He made his Austrian Football First League debut for Floridsdorfer AC on 21 July 2017 in a game against SC Austria Lustenau.
