= Nico Löffler =

Austrian footballer

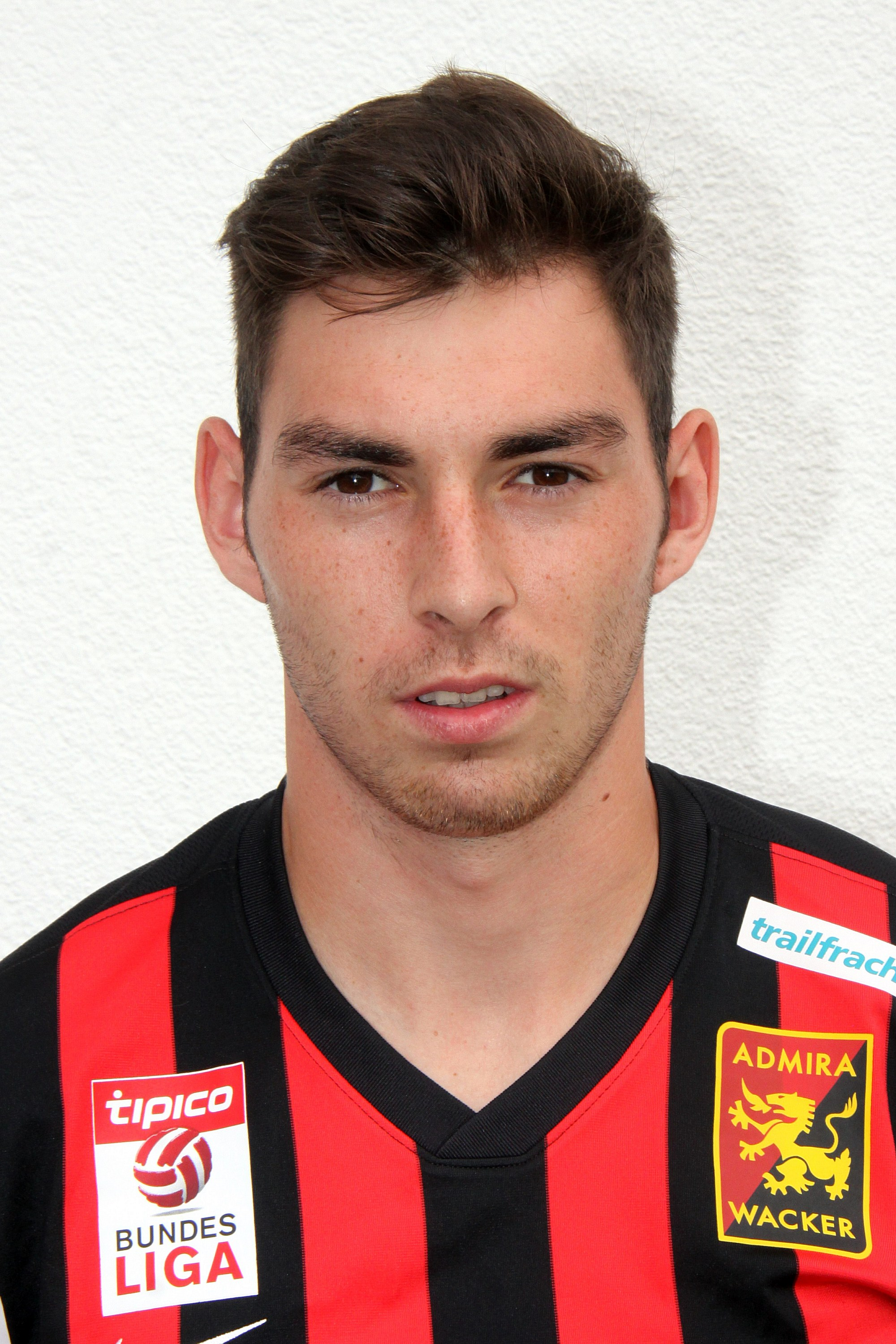

Personal information
- Date of birth: 5 July 1997 (age 29)
- Place of birth: Austria
- Height: 1.72 m (5 ft 8 in)
- Position: Midfielder

Team information
- Current team: SV Stripfing
- Number: 11

Youth career
- –2014: Admira Wacker

Senior career*
Years	Team	Apps	(Gls)
2014–2017	Admira Wacker	2	(0)
2014–2017	Admira Wacker II	74	(13)
2017–2019	VfB Lübeck	31	(3)
2019–	SV Stripfing		
- * Club domestic league appearances and goals as of 23:07, 17 October 2019 (UTC)

Nico Löffler (born 5 July 1997) is an Austrian footballer who plays for SV Stripfing.
