= Daniel Jelišić =

German footballer (born 2000)

Personal information
- Date of birth: 18 February 2000 (age 26)
- Place of birth: Munich, Germany
- Height: 1.78 m (5 ft 10 in)
- Position: Midfielder

Youth career
- –2007: TSV Neuried
- 2007–2019: Bayern Munich

Senior career*
Years	Team	Apps	(Gls)
2019–2021	LASK	0	(0)
2019–2021	→ FC Juniors OÖ (loan)	13	(0)
2021–2024	FC Pipinsried	41	(0)
2024	Türkgücü München	3	(0)
- * Club domestic league appearances and goals as of 18:03, 4 July 2024 (UTC)

Daniel Jelišić (born 18 February 2000) is a German footballer who most recently played as a midfielder for Regionalliga Bayern club Türkgücü München.

== Club career ==
Jelišić began his career in the youth system of Bayern Munich, joining the under-17 team ahead of the 2016–17 season. He made his first appearance in the Under 17 Bundesliga in September 2016. In the same season, he played in 23 league matches and scored three goals, helping Bayern win the league title. He also played in all three games of the championship playoffs. The following season, Jelišić moved up to the under-19 squad, where he made his first appearance in the Under 19 Bundesliga in August 2017. He also made four appearances in the UEFA Youth League and played in 18 under-19 Bundesliga games for the team.

In March 2019, Jelišić was named in the squad for Bayern Munich's Regionalliga team, which won promotion to the 3. Liga at the end of the season. However, he did not make an appearance for the team. In the 2018–19 season, Jelišić played 16 games for the under-19 team and three in the Youth League.

On 18 June 2019, Jelišić joined LASK as a free agent after failing to break through to Bayern's first team. The move was facilitated by the two clubs' close relationship. At first, he was set to compete for FC Juniors OÖ, the second-tier farm team of LASK. Jelišić made his professional debut for Juniors OÖ in the Austrian Football Second League on 16 August 2019, coming on as a substitute in the 81st minute for Fabian Benko against Wacker Innsbruck, with the away match finishing in a 2–1 loss. After the 2020–21 season, he left LASK.

After several months without a club, he returned to Germany in October 2021 and joined Regionalliga club FC Pipinsried, where he was reunited with his brother Nikola. On 3 May 2022, he extended his contract with the club until 2023.

== Personal life ==
Jelišić's older brother, Nikola, is also a footballer.
