= Alberto Prada =

Spanish footballer

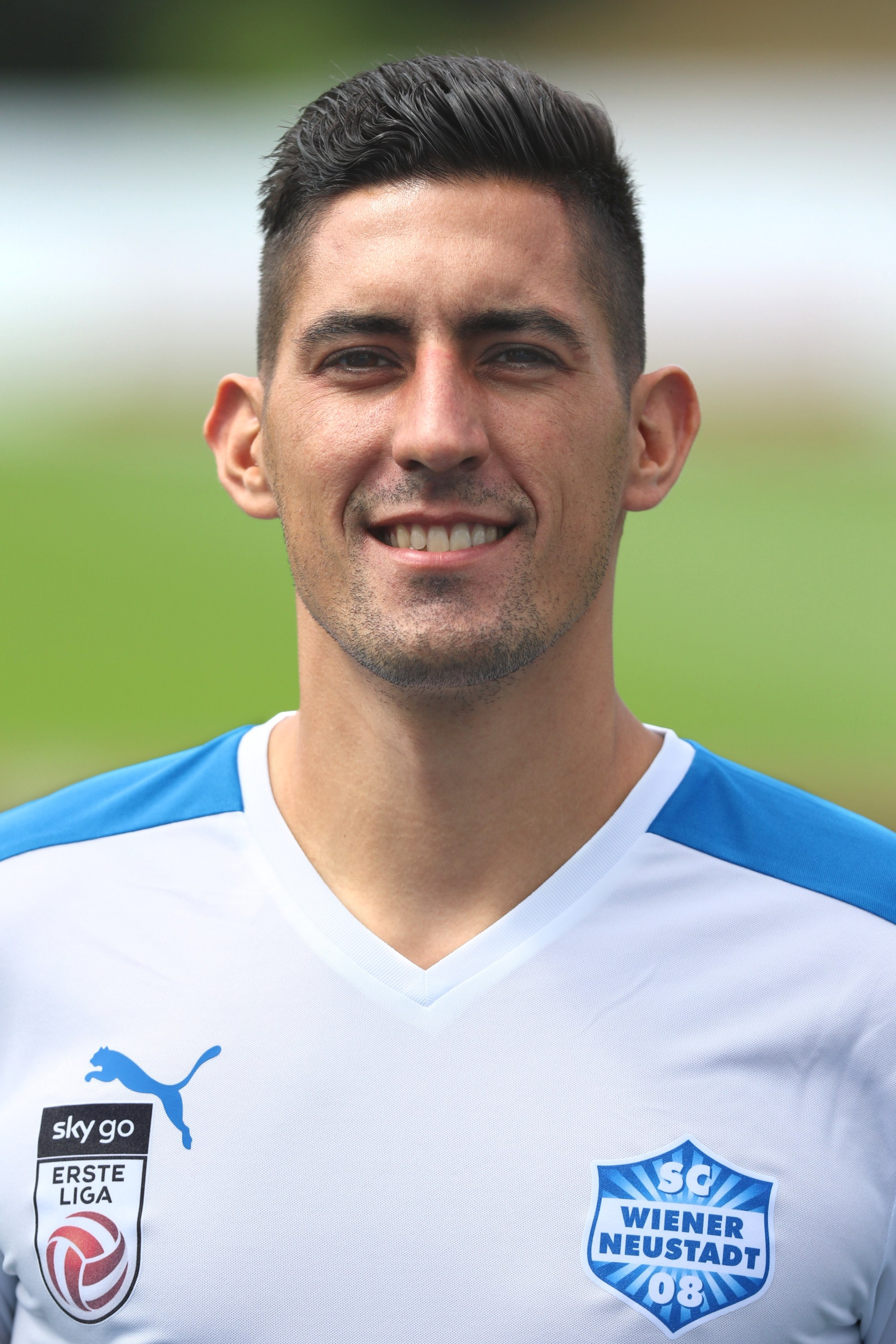

Personal information
- Full name: Alberto Prada Vega
- Date of birth: 19 January 1989 (age 37)
- Place of birth: Ponferrada, Spain
- Height: 1.84 m (6 ft 1/2 in)
- Position: Left back

Team information
- Current team: Union Dietach
- Number: 17

Youth career
- Valladolid

Senior career*
Years	Team	Apps	(Gls)
2008–2009	Valladolid B	29	(0)
2009–2011	Zaragoza B	62	(2)
2011–2015	Zamora	147	(8)
2015	Cádiz	3	(0)
2015–2017	Ried	47	(0)
2017–2019	Wiener Neustadt	40	(4)
2019–2023	Vorwärts Steyr	109	(11)
2023–	Union Dietach	44	(3)
- * Club domestic league appearances and goals as of 8 March 2025

Alberto Prada Vega (born 19 January 1989) is a Spanish professional footballer who plays for Austrian club Union Dietach as a left back.

== Club career ==
Prada was born in Ponferrada, León, Castile and León, and represented Real Valladolid as a youth. He made his senior debut with the reserves in 2008, in Segunda División B.

In 2009, Prada joined another reserve team, Real Zaragoza B from Tercera División. On 8 July 2011 he returned to the third level after agreeing to a three-year contract with Zamora CF.

On 21 May 2015, Prada signed for Cádiz CF as a replacement to injured Andrés ahead of the play-offs. He appeared in three matches for the club, before moving to the Austrian Football Bundesliga with SV Ried on 2 July. He made his professional debut 23 days later, coming on as a second-half substitute for Thomas Murg in a 0–3 away loss against SK Rapid Wien; he quickly became a regular starter, and appeared in 27 matches during the campaign.
