= Oliver Filip =

Austrian footballer (born 1998)

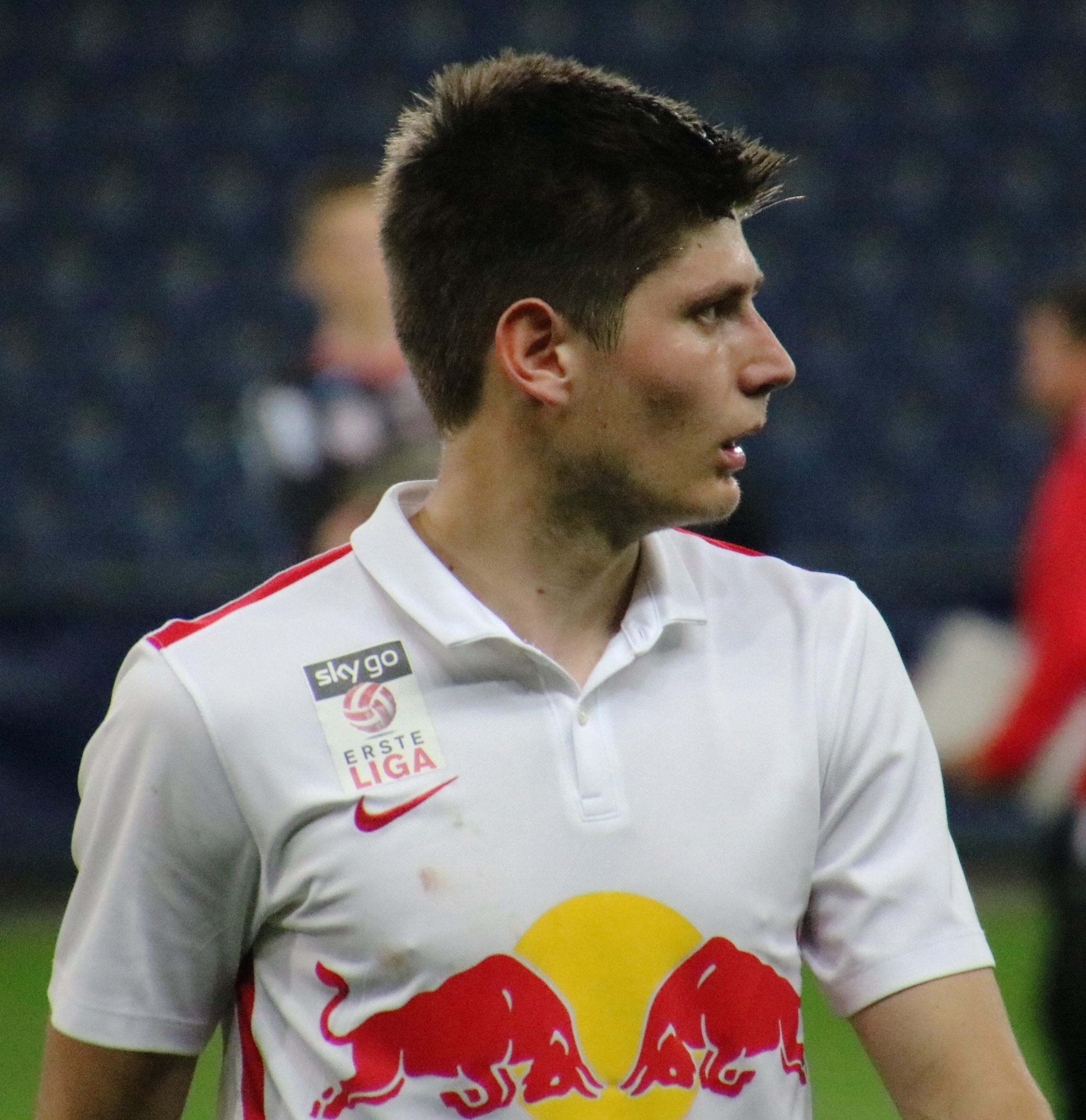

Personal information
- Date of birth: 15 January 1998 (age 28)
- Place of birth: Leoben, Austria
- Height: 1.80 m (5 ft 11 in)
- Position: Right winger

Team information
- Current team: Vorwärts Steyr
- Number: 24

Youth career
- 2005–2010: SC St. Peter-Freienstein
- 2010–2014: SK Sturm Graz
- 2014–2016: FC Red Bull Salzburg

Senior career*
Years	Team	Apps	(Gls)
2016–2017	FC Liefering	31	(5)
2017–2019	Sturm Graz	9	(1)
2018–2019	→ WSG Wattens (loan)	22	(1)
2019–2021	Blau-Weiß Linz	54	(4)
2021–	Vorwärts Steyr	87	(15)

International career
2014–2015	Austria U17	12	(5)
2016–2017	Austria U19	5	(0)
- * Club domestic league appearances and goals as of 28 December 2024

Oliver Filip (born 15 January 1998) is an Austrian footballer who plays for Vorwärts Steyr.

== Club career ==
He made his professional debut in the Austrian Football First League for FC Liefering on 26 February 2016 in a game against SKN St. Pölten.

On 13 June 2021, he moved to Vorwärts Steyr.
