= Stefan Rakowitz =

Austrian footballer

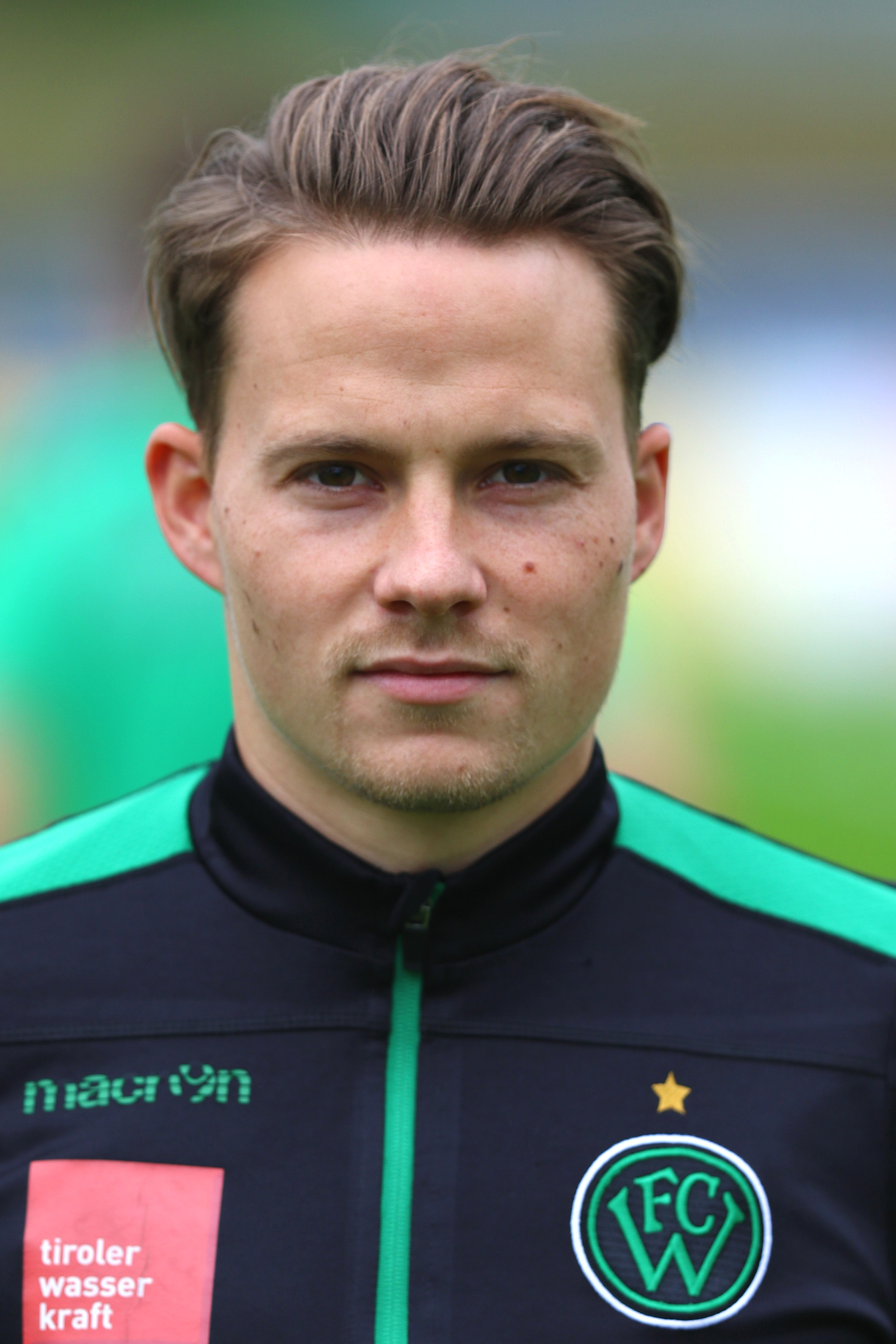

Personal information
- Full name: Stefan Rakowitz
- Date of birth: 3 April 1990 (age 36)
- Place of birth: Oberwart, Austria
- Height: 1.71 m (5 ft 7 in)
- Position: Left midfielder

Team information
- Current team: SV Stripfing
- Number: 7

Youth career
- 1997–2003: SC Pinkafeld
- 2003–2008: AKA Burgenland
- 2008: SC Pinkafeld

Senior career*
Years	Team	Apps	(Gls)
2008–2012	TSV Hartberg	101	(12)
2012–2014	Wiener Neustadt	44	(4)
2014–2015	Ritzing	25	(9)
2015–2016	Horn	23	(12)
2016–2017	Wiener Neustadt	24	(8)
2017–2019	Wacker Innsbruck	46	(9)
2019–2021	TSV Hartberg	26	(5)
2022–	SV Stripfing	46	(6)
- * Club domestic league appearances and goals as of 26 May 2024

Stefan Rakowitz (born 3 April 1990) is an Austrian professional footballer who plays for SV Stripfing.

== Club career ==
He started his career in 2008 playing in the Austrian Regional League with TSV Hartberg. At the end of the season, they won the Central Regionalliga. He then signed with SC Wiener Neustadt in 2012, to play in the Austrian Football Bundesliga. On 16 July 2014, he signed with SC Ritzing.

== Honours ==
TSV Hartberg

- Central Regionalliga: 2008-09
