= Florian Sittsam =

Austrian footballer

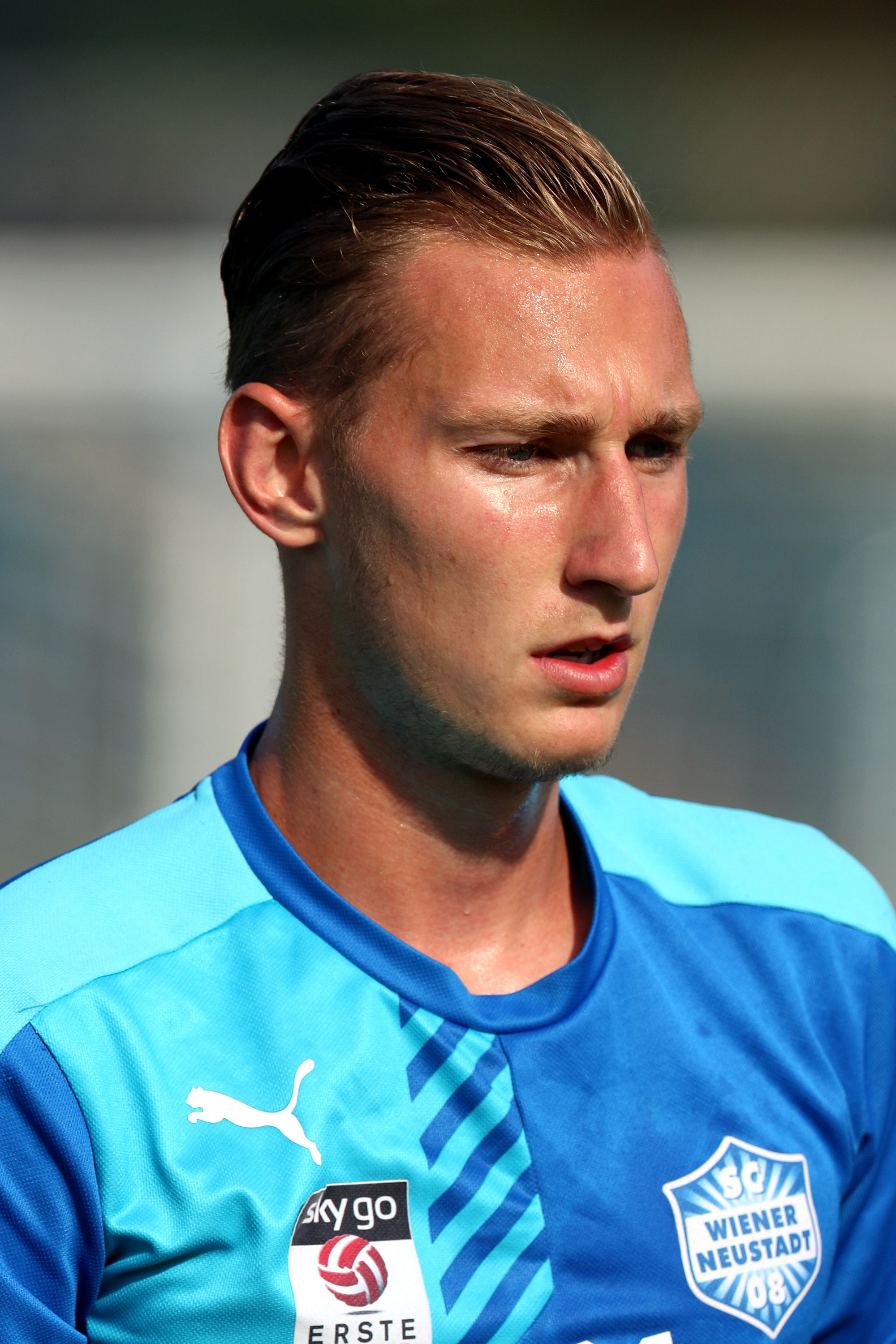

Personal information
- Date of birth: 14 December 1994 (age 31)
- Place of birth: Deutschlandsberg, Austria
- Height: 1.86 m (6 ft 1 in)
- Position: Midfielder

Team information
- Current team: Kremser SC
- Number: 16

Youth career
- –2011: SK Sturm Graz

Senior career*
Years	Team	Apps	(Gls)
2011–2014	SK Sturm Graz II	63	(7)
2014–2015	SV Horn	45	(10)
2015–2017	Wiener Neustadt	68	(8)
2017–2018	SV Mattersburg	11	(0)
2018–2019	TSV Hartberg	20	(1)
2019–2021	SV Horn	57	(7)
2021–2023	SV Lafnitz	50	(2)
2023–	Kremser SC	44	(1)

International career
2012	Austria U19	2	(0)
2014–2015	Austria U21	4	(0)
- * Club domestic league appearances and goals as of 28 December 2024

Florian Sittsam (born 14 December 1994) is an Austrian professional footballer who plays for Kremser SC.
