= Marco Stark (Austrian footballer) =

Austrian footballer

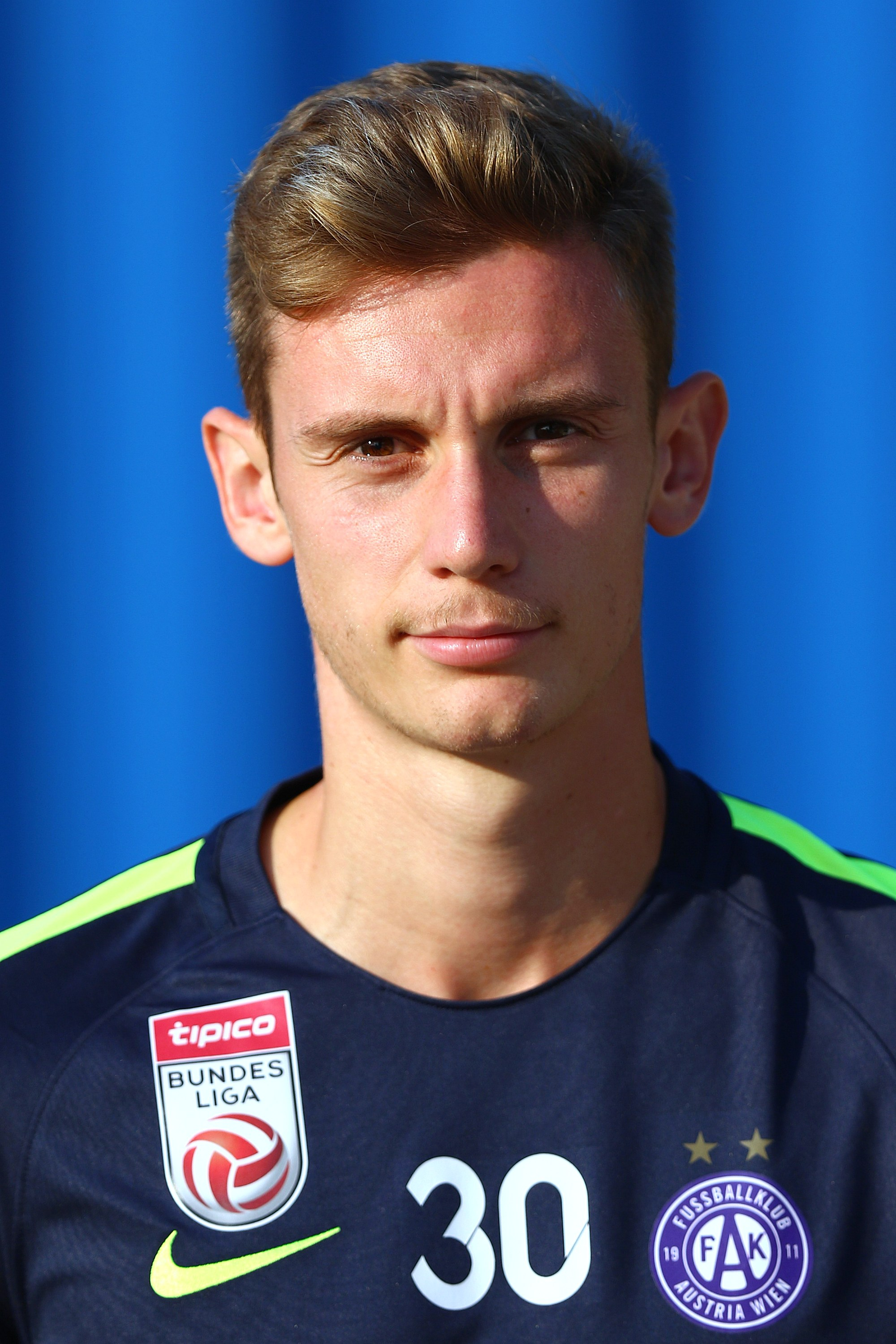

Personal information
- Date of birth: 5 January 1993 (age 33)
- Place of birth: Bludenz, Austria
- Height: 1.91 m (6 ft 3 in)
- Position: Defender

Youth career
- Rätia Bludenz
- AKA Vorarlberg

Senior career*
Years	Team	Apps	(Gls)
2010–2011	FC Lustenau 07	0	(0)
2011–2016	FK Austria Wien II	114	(8)
2015–2016	FK Austria Wien	1	(0)
2016–2017	SC Austria Lustenau	25	(0)
2017–2018	FK Austria Wien II	29	(0)
2017–2018	FK Austria Wien	2	(0)
2019–2023	SKU Amstetten	131	(8)
- * Club domestic league appearances and goals

Marco Stark (born 5 January 1993) is an Austrian former footballer.

== Career ==
=== SKU Amstetten ===
On 20 December 2018, SKU Amstetten confirmed the signing of Stark on a contract until 2020.
