= Alexander Gründler =

Austrian footballer

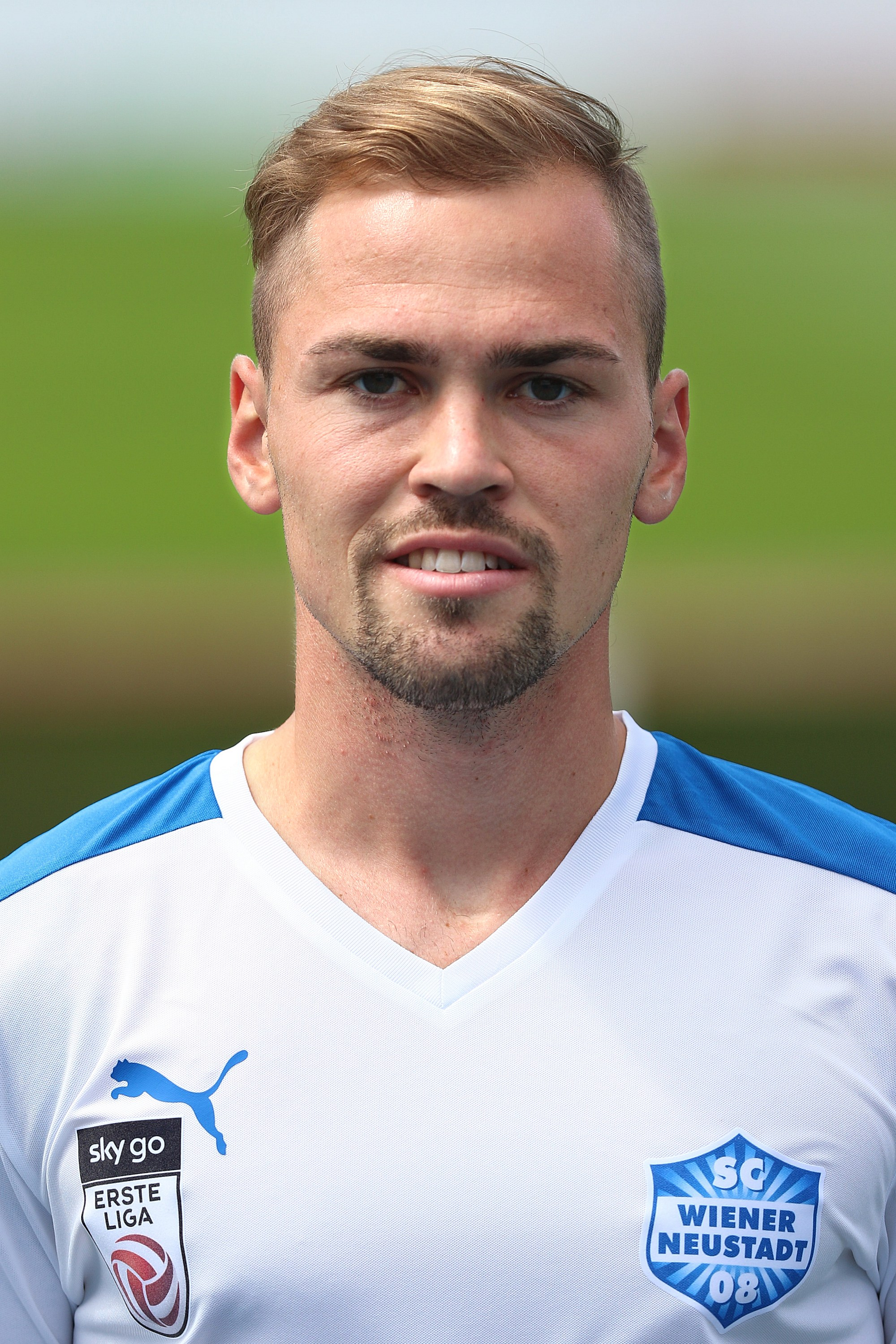

Personal information
- Date of birth: 24 July 1993 (age 33)
- Place of birth: Austria
- Height: 1.72 m (5 ft 7 1/2 in)
- Positions: Right winger; forward

Team information
- Current team: SV Fügen
- Number: 10

Senior career*
Years	Team	Apps	(Gls)
2010–2017	FC Wacker Innsbruck II	65	(31)
2013–2017	FC Wacker Innsbruck	95	(15)
2017–2018	Wiener Neustadt	31	(0)
2018–2019	Wacker Innsbruck II	21	(4)
2018–2022	Wacker Innsbruck	72	(7)
2022–	SV Fügen	76	(29)
- * Club domestic league appearances and goals as of 8 November 2025

Alexander Gründler (born 24 July 1993) is an Austrian footballer who plays for Regionalliga Tirol club SV Fügen.
