= Lukas Skrivanek =

Austrian footballer

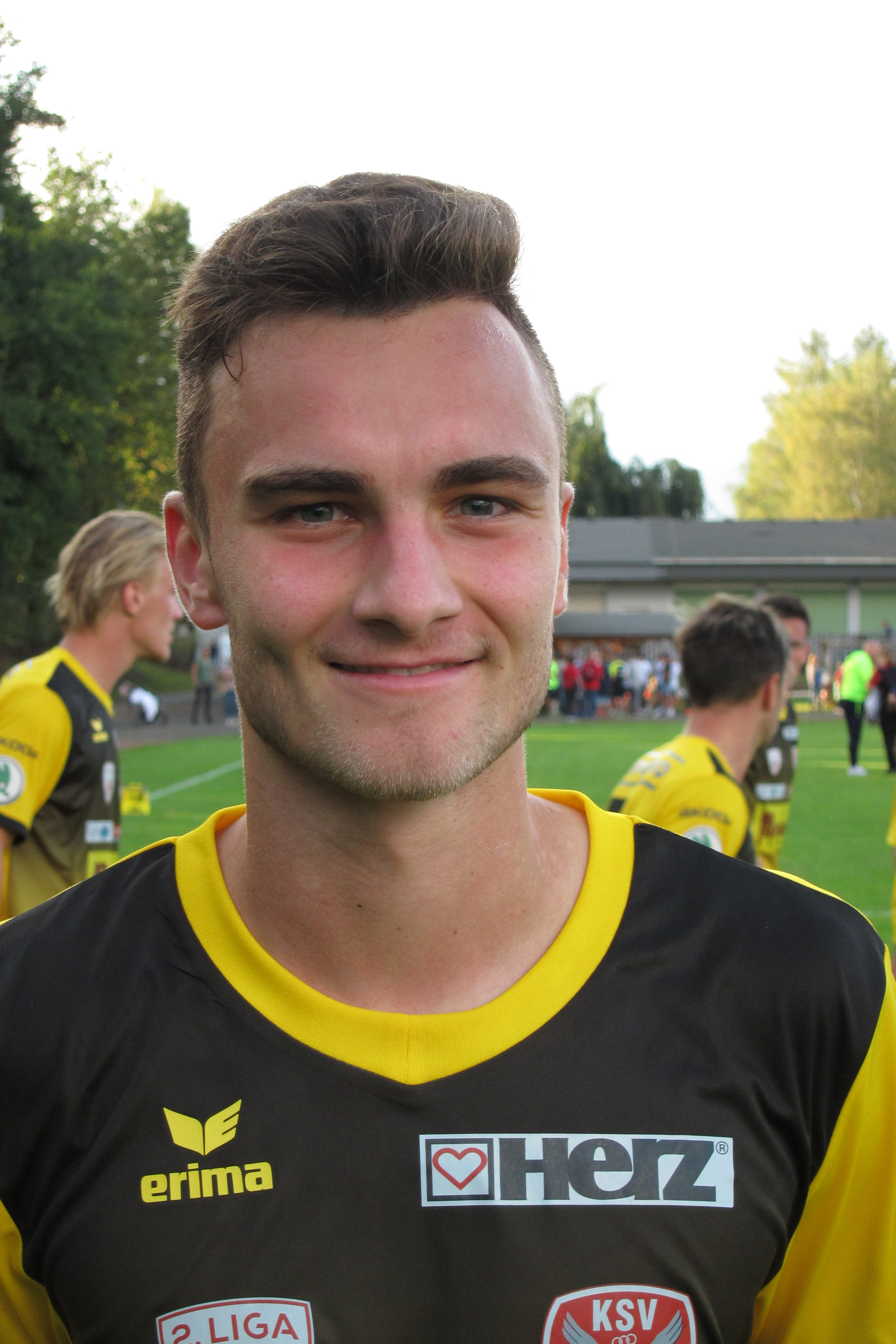

Personal information
- Date of birth: 1 February 1997 (age 29)
- Place of birth: Leoben, Austria
- Height: 1.73 m (5 ft 8 in)
- Positions: Midfielder; winger

Team information
- Current team: DSV Leoben II
- Number: 20

Youth career
- 2002–2009: DSV Leoben
- 2009–2010: Grazer AK
- 2010: AKA HIB Liebenau
- 2010–2015: Sturm Graz

Senior career*
Years	Team	Apps	(Gls)
2014–2017	Sturm Graz II	50	(3)
2016–2019	Sturm Graz	0	(0)
2017–2018	→ Blau-Weiß Linz (loan)	21	(0)
2018–2019	→ Kapfenberger SV (loan)	26	(1)
2019–2020	Kapfenberger SV	17	(0)
2020–2021	Floridsdorfer AC	22	(1)
2021–2022	DSV Leoben	27	(9)
2023–	DSV Leoben II	2	(5)
- * Club domestic league appearances and goals as of 15:26, 9 April 2023 (UTC)

Lukas Skrivanek (born 1 February 1997) is an Austrian football player. He plays for DSV Leoben.

== Club career ==
He made his Austrian Football First League debut for FC Blau-Weiß Linz on 21 July 2017 in a game against FC Wacker Innsbruck.

On 14 August 2020, he signed with Floridsdorfer AC. In the summer 2021, Skrivanek returned to his childhood club DSV Leoben. In March 2023 it was reported, that Leoben was refusing Skrivanek to train with the clubs first team anymore. For that reason, Skrivanek began playing for the clubs reserve team.
