= Bernd Gschweidl =

Austrian footballer (born 1995)

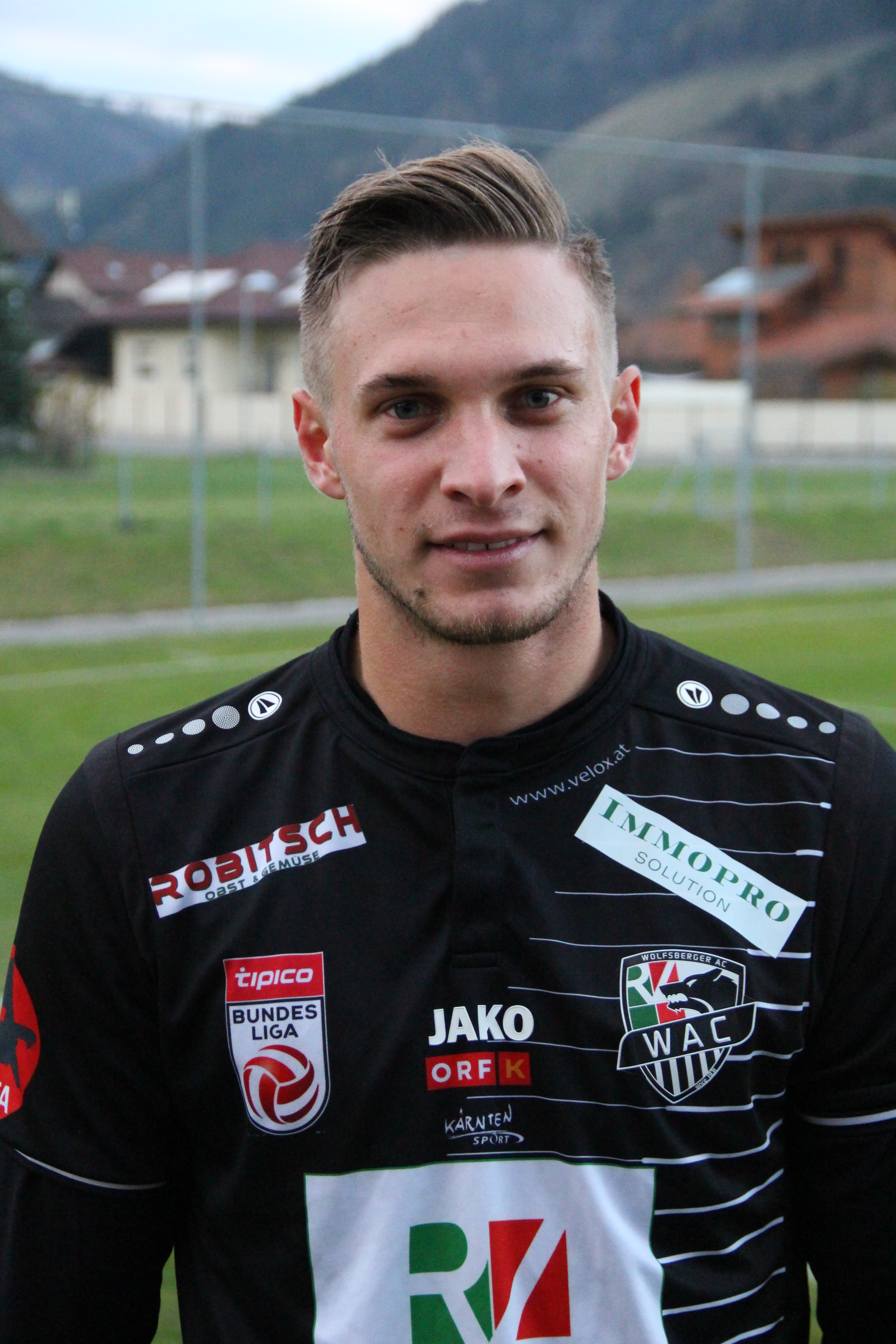
- Gschweidl with Wolfsberger AC in 2018

Personal information
- Date of birth: 8 September 1995 (age 31)
- Place of birth: Stockerau, Austria
- Height: 1.77 m (5 ft 10 in)
- Position: Forward

Team information
- Current team: SKN St. Pölten
- Number: 9

Youth career
- 2001–2009: 1.FC Bisamberg
- 2009–2013: SKN St. Pölten

Senior career*
Years	Team	Apps	(Gls)
2013–2014	SV Horn	24	(7)
2014–2016	SV Grödig	19	(1)
2016	SKN St. Pölten	10	(2)
2016–2017	Wiener Neustadt	34	(8)
2017–2019	Wolfsberger AC	49	(7)
2019–2020	Rheindorf Altach II	3	(0)
2019–2020	Rheindorf Altach	6	(0)
2020–2021	SV Ried	36	(11)
2021–	SKN St. Pölten	55	(12)

International career
2014	Austria U19	4	(1)
2015	Austria U20	6	(3)
- * Club domestic league appearances and goals as of 17 May 2026

Bernd Gschweidl (born 8 September 1995) is an Austrian professional footballer who plays for 2. Liga club SKN St. Pölten.

== Career ==
On 12 June 2019, it was confirmed, that Gschweidl had joined SC Rheindorf Altach on a two-year contract. However, he left the club on 14 January 2020 to join SV Ried, signing a deal until the summer 2022. With Ried, he won promotion to the Austrian Bundesliga in 2020. He made 36 league appearances for the club, in which he scored 11 goals.

Prior to the 2021–22 season, Gschweidl returned to now second-tier club SKN St. Pölten, where he had earlier played in 2016, signing a contract until June 2023.

== Honours ==
SKN St. Pölten

- 2. Liga: 2015–16

SV Ried

- 2. Liga: 2019–20
