= 2011–12 Austrian Football First League =

Austrian Football First League
- Season: 2011–12
- Champions: WAC/St. Andrä
- Relegated: LASK Linz; TSV Hartberg
- Matches: 180
- Goals: 520 (2.89 per match)
- Top goalscorer: David Poljanec
- Total attendance: 428,262
- Average attendance: 2,379

The 2011–12 Austrian Football First League was the 38th season of the Austrian second-level football league. It began on 10 June 2011 and ended on 18 May 2012 after the 36th and final round. The Carinthian cooperative associations Wolfsberger AC and SK St. Andrä won the championship. WAC, which ended its cooperative with SK St. Andrä after the 2011–12 season, moved up to the Bundesliga for the first time. The last place team of TSV Hartberg had to move down to the Austrian Regional League Central. The second-to-last place team had to play two relegation matches against Grazer AK, the champion of the Central Regional League.

== Overview ==
Clubs in the "Today for tomorrow" 2011–12 First League

The First League is the second-highest league in Austrian professional soccer and held its 36th season in 2011–12. LASK Linz was new in the league as well as the two winners of the relegation matches (ninth place in the First League 2010–11 against the champion of the Regional League East 2010–11 and the champion of the Regional League West 2010–11 against the champion of the Regional League Central 2010-11).

In the 2011–12 season, Vorarlberg had three clubs, Upper Austria had two clubs, and Vienna, Lower Austria, Salzburg, Styria, and Carinthia each had one club. Burgenland and Tyrol were not represented in the First League.

sky Deutschland owned the television rights for the First League as in the Bundesliga which allowed them to show every game in full length. The games were broadcast on sky sport austria and as part of a conference circuit with four games beginning at 6:30PM. In the last two rounds, all games had to be played at the same time, and sky was allowed to pick an additional game which would be designated as the "Top Game of the Round" and would be shown at 8:30PM on Fridays. ORF also had the rights to broadcast the Top Game of the Round live and in full length. They broadcast the games on their channel ORF Sport +.

== Method ==
In the 2011–12 season, which began on 10 July 2011, ten clubs competed against each other in 36 rounds, as had been done in previous seasons. The championship ended on 13 May 2012.

The champion of the league moved up to the Bundesliga. The last place team had to move down to its corresponding region in the Regional League. This team was replaced by the winner of the two qualification matches between the champions of the Regional League West and Regional League East. The next-to-last team had to play two relegation matches against the champion of the Regional League Central. The winner of the relegation matches qualified for the First League for the 2012–13 season.

== League table ==
Pos	Team	Pld	W	D	L	GF	GA	GD	Pts	Promotion or relegation
1	WAC/St. Andrä (P)	36	19	11	6	71	49	+22	68	Promotion to 2012–13 Austrian Bundesliga
2	SCR Altach	36	18	8	10	62	39	+23	62	
3	LASK Linz (Note: Relegated from the Bundesliga) (R)	36	16	13	7	55	40	+15	61	Relegated to 2012–13 Austrian Regionalliga because of license withdrawal
4	SC Austria Lustenau	36	16	10	10	59	47	+12	58	
5	SKN St. Pölten	36	14	9	13	45	45	0	51	
6	FC Blau-Weiß Linz (Note: Relegation winner (Regional League West against Regional League Central))	36	13	10	13	49	52	−3	49	
7	SV Grödig	36	11	9	16	46	52	−6	42	
8	First Vienna FC 1894 (Note: Relegation winner (9th 2010-11 against Regional League East))	36	9	10	17	44	56	−12	37	
9	FC Lustenau 07	36	9	10	17	51	66	−15	37	
10	TSV Hartberg (O)	36	7	6	23	38	74	−36	27	Qualification to relegation playoffs

Source: www.bundesliga.at
(O) Play-off winners; (P) Promoted; (R) Relegated

== Results ==
First Heat (Rounds 1–18)
Home \ Away	LIN	ALT	LUS	WAC	SKN	SVG	L07	HAR	FVF	BW
LASK Linz		0–2	0–3	2–3	2–0	2–1	2–1	4–0	4–0	1–1
SC Rheindorf Altach	2–0		1–1	1–2	1–0	1–2	4–1	4–2	1–1	2–0
SC Austria Lustenau	1–1	0–5		1–1	1–1	0–0	2–0	4–0	2–1	1–0
WAC/St. Andrä	1–1	2–2	3–3		1–1	1–0	2–0	3–0	2–2	3–2
SKN St. Pölten	2–2	1–2	2–1	0–2		2–0	3–0	1–0	0–3	0–1
SV Grödig	0–3	2–1	1–2	3–3	2–2		1–0	2–3	4–0	1–3
FC Lustenau 07	1–1	2–2	3–1	2–5	1–2	1–3		2–2	4–1	1–0
TSV Hartberg	0–2	0–4	2–3	4–3	1–1	2–4	2–0		2–0	1–1
First Vienna FC 1894	0–1	0–1	2–0	2–3	3–1	1–1	4–2	1–0		0–0
FC Blau-Weiß Linz	1–1	2–0	2–1	2–2	1–2	3–0	1–6	2–1	4–1	

Legend: Blue = home team win; Yellow = draw; Red = away team win.

Second Heat (Rounds 19–36)
Home \ Away	LIN	ALT	LUS	WAC	SKN	SVG	L07	HAR	FVF	BW
LASK Linz		3–2	2–1	2–1	2–1	1–1	1–1	1–1	2–1	1–2
SC Rheindorf Altach	0–1		1–1	0–0	1–0	2–0	1–1	1–0	4–2	4–1
SC Austria Lustenau	2–1	4–1		2–2	1–1	3–0	1–2	2–0	0–0	1–3
WAC/St. Andrä	1–0	1–0	1–2		2–0	3–2	2–1	1–4	2–2	2–0
SKN St. Pölten	1–1	1–3	3–1	3–2		1–0	3–2	2–0	0–2	2–0
SV Grödig	1–1	1–2	1–2	0–1	2–0		1–1	3–1	1–0	1–3
FC Lustenau 07	1–1	2–2	1–3	0–2	2–2	0–3		0–3	1–0	2–0
TSV Hartberg	1–2	0–2	0–2	0–3	0–3	0–1	0–3		1–1	2–4
First Vienna FC 1894	1–2	2–0	3–1	1–3	0–0	0–0	2–3	1–2		2–0
FC Blau-Weiß Linz	2–2	1–0	0–3	2–0	0–1	1–1	1–1	1–1	2–2	

Legend: Blue = home team win; Yellow = draw; Red = away team win.

=== Goal scoring statistics ===
Rank	Goals	Name	Country	Club
1	19	David Poljanec	Slovenia	FC Blau-Weiß Linz
2	18	Christian Falk	Austria	WAC/St. Andrä
3	17	Daniel Lucas Segovia	Spain	SKN St. Pölten
4	14	Johannes Aigner	Austria	LASK Linz
	14	Tomi Correa	Spain	SCR Altach
	14	Jacobo Ynclán	Spain	WAC/St. Andrä
7	13	Patrick Seeger	Austria	SCR Altach
8	11	Pierre Boya	Cameroon	SC Austria Lustenau
	11	Diego Viana	Brazil	SV Grödig
10	10	Manuel Hartl	Austria	FC Blau-Weiß Linz
	10	Lukas Mössner	Austria	TSV Hartberg
	10	Stephan Stückler	Austria	WAC/St. Andrä

=== Cities, venues, and attendance ===
City	Residents	Club	Stadium	Capacity	Total attendance	Average attendance	± from 2010–11
Altach	6,356	SC Rheindorf Altach	Stadion Schnabelholz	8,200	63,741	3,541	−5.48%
Grödig	6,862	SV Grödig	Untersberg-Arena	2,955	15,300	850	+21.26%
Hartberg	6,602	TSV Hartberg	Stadion Hartberg	4,000	18,900	1,050	−16.67%
Linz	189,311	FC Blau-Weiß Linz	Linzer Stadion	18,000	46,834	2,602	+183.84%
Linz	189,311	LASK Linz	Linzer Stadion	18,000	60,700	3,372	−43.97%
Lustenau	21,076	FC Lustenau 07	Reichshofstadion	8,500	30,000	1,667	−5.96%
Lustenau	21,076	SC Austria Lustenau	Reichshofstadion	8,500	78,600	4,367	+21.67%
St. Pölten	51,688	SKN St. Pölten	Voithplatz	8,000	26,115	1,451	+30.96%
Vienna	1,705,080	First Vienna FC 1894	Hohe Warte Vienna	4,500	39,800	2,211	+12.96%
Wolfsberg	25,162	WAC/St. Andrä	Lavanttal-Arena	4,100	48,272	2,682	+69.78%

== The champions WAC/St. Andrä ==
- Goalkeeper: Christian Dobnik (36 games/0 goals);
- Defensemen: Dario Baldauf (34/6), Michael Sollbauer (31/3), Nenad Jovanović (25/2), Rene Gsellmann (24/0), Gernot Suppan (24/0), Hannes Jochum (14/0), José Antonio Solano (10/2), Christoph Cemernjak (8/0), Mathias Berchtold (8/0);
- Midfielders: Jacobo Ynclán (34/14), Manuel Kehre (33/5), Sandro Zakany (31/3), Gernot Messner (26/0), Markus Kreuz (26/0), Roland Putsche (22/0), Danijel Mićić (14/0), Mario Kröpfl (9/0), Patrick Pfennich (9/0);
- Strikers: Christian Falk (35/15), Mihret Topcagić (32/8), Stephan Stückler (28/10), Sandro Gotal (12/0);
- Management: Nenad Bjelica (Head coach), Slobodan Grubor (Assistant coach), Adi Preschern (Goalie coach).

== Promotion/relegation playoffs ==
In the new class reform of 2009, it was decided that the promotion candidates of the Regional Leagues together with the ninth place in the First League must compete in the relegation matches in order to remain in or be promoted to the First League. An alternating method of relegation matches was agreed upon for the Regional League teams. Accordingly, the Regional League Central had to compete against the ninth place in the First League and the Regional League East had to compete against the Regional League West in this season. On the basis of the license withdrawal of LASK Linz and the associated demotion to the Regional League Central, the ninth place in the First League, FC Lustenau 07, remained in the second level of play without a relegation match. The last place in the First League, TSV Hartberg, moved up to the relegation place and competed against the Regional League Central champion.

In the first pairing, the last place in the First League, TSV Hartberg, played against the champion of the Regional League central, Grazer AK.

Date	Home team		Away team	Result
5 June 2012	Grazer AK	–	TSV Hartberg	0–0
Ref.: Gerhard Grobelnik	Goal scorers: None
8 June 2012	TSV Hartberg	–	Grazer AK	3–0 (1–0); Stopped in the 77th minute after GAK fans stormed the field
Ref.: Markus Hameter	Goal scorers: 1:0 (19th) Luca Tauschmann, 2:0 (60th) Matej Milatović, 3:0 (76th) Daniel Rossmann

In the second pairing, the champion of the Regional League East, SV Horn, played against the Regional League West champion WSG Swarovski Wattens.

Date	Home team		Away team	Result
4 June 2012	WSG Wattens	–	SV Horn	1–5 (0–3)
Ref.: Thomas Prammer	Goal scorers: 0:1 (21st) Mario Konrad, 0:2 (31st) Mario Konrad, 0:3 (40th) Salmin Cehajić, 0:4 (50th) Miroslav Milosević, 1:4 (83rd) Benjamin Pranter, 1:5 (90+2nd) Salmin Cehajić
8 June 2012	SV Horn	–	WSG Wattens	4–0 (0–0)
Ref.: Rene Eisner	Goal scorers: 1:0 (48th) Phillip Zulechner, 2:0 (54th) Emir Dilić, 3:0 (74th) Slaven Lalić, 4:0 (89th) Miroslav Milosević

== See also ==
- 2011–12 Austrian Football Bundesliga
- 2011–12 Austrian Cup
