= 2013–14 Wolfsberger AC season =

Season of football team

Wolfsberger AC is an Austrian football club based in Wolfsberg, Carinthia. During the 2013–14 campaign, they competed in the Austrian Bundesliga and the Austrian Cup.

== Austrian Bundesliga ==
20 July 2013 Match 1	Wolfsberger AC	2–2	Rapid Wien	Wolfsberg, Carinthia
19:00	Mićić 58'; Dunst (yellow card) 61'; Topcagić (yellow card) 64'; Liendl 89' (pen.)	Summary	Burgstaller 29' (yellow card) 73'; Schaub 37'; Schrammel (yellow card) 38'; Sabitzer (yellow card) 39'; Pichler (yellow card) 90+1'	Stadium: Lavanttal-Arena; Attendance: 6,800; Referee: Robert Schörgenhofer

27 July 2013 Match 2	SV Ried	1–0	Wolfsberger AC	Ried im Innkreis
19:00	Janeczek (yellow card) 4'; Gartler 68' (yellow card) 70'; Gebauer (yellow card) 83'	Summary	Baldauf (yellow card) 38' (yellow-red card); Topcagić (yellow card) 40'; Mićić (yellow card) 59'; Sollbauer (yellow card) 60'	Stadium: Keine Sorgen Arena; Attendance: 4,200; Referee: Alexander Harkam

3 August 2013 Match 3	Wiener Neustadt	2–1	Wolfsberger AC	Wiener Neustadt
16:30	Hlinka 12' (pen.); Martschinko 78'	Summary	Kerhe 1'; Hüttenbrenner (yellow card) 12'; Mićić (yellow card) 90+1'	Stadium: Stadion Wiener Neustadt; Attendance: 1,650; Referee: Dieter Muckenhammer

10 August 2013 Match 4	Wolfsberger AC	1–1	Wacker Innsbruck	Wolfsberg, Carinthia
16:30	Liendl 30'; Kerhe (yellow card) 43'; Polverino (yellow card) 47' (yellow-red card); Alexander Kofler (yellow card) 71'	Summary	Kofler (yellow card) 18'; Hinterseer 65'; Bergmann (yellow card) 84'; Schilling (yellow card) 88'	Stadium: Lavanttal-Arena; Attendance: 4,600; Referee: Manuel Schüttengruber

17 August 2013 Match 5	SV Grödig	4–3	Wolfsberger AC	Grödig
19:00	Zulechner 10'; Salamon 19'; Suppan 29' (o.g.); Leitgeb (yellow card) 30'; Taboga (yellow card) 52' (yellow-red card); Tschernegg (yellow card) 54'; Sigurðsson 73'	Summary	Hüttenbrenner (yellow card) 7'; Liendl 71' (pen.); Falk 80'; Jacobo Ynclán 86' (yellow card) 86'	Stadium: Untersberg-Arena; Attendance: 1,755; Referee: Robert Schörgenhofer

24 August 2013 Match 6	Wolfsberger AC	1–4	Austria Wien	Wolfsberg, Carinthia
19:00	Polverino (yellow card) 45+1'; Baldauf 69'; Sollbauer (yellow card) 76'	Summary	Royer 28'; Rotpuller (yellow card) 34'; Dilaver (yellow card) 51'; Grünwald 59'; Murg (yellow card) 65'; Stanković 83'; Kienast 86'	Stadium: Lavanttal-Arena; Attendance: 5,600; Referee: Dominik Ouschan

31 August 2013 Match 7	Sturm Graz	4–1	Wolfsberger AC	Graz
16:30	Vujadinović 6'; Hadžić 16' (yellow card) 20'; Kainz (yellow card) 37'; Beichler (yellow card) 64' (goal) 69'; Berić 73' (pen.)	Summary	José Antonio Solano Moreno (yellow card) 18'; Suppan (yellow card) 25'; Falk (yellow card) 52'; Daniel Lucas Segovia (yellow card) 81'; Kerhe 86'	Stadium: UPC-Arena; Attendance: 8,600; Referee: Manuel Schüttengruber

14 September 2013 Match 8	Wolfsberger AC	3–1	Admira	Wolfsberg, Carinthia
19:00	Falk 2'; Topcagić 80'; Liendl 90+3'	Summary	Ouédraogo 60'; Katzer (yellow card) 66'	Stadium: Lavanttal-Arena; Attendance: 4,700; Referee: Rene Eisner

22 September 2013 Match 9	Red Bull Salzburg	2–2	Wolfsberger AC	Wals-Siezenheim
19:00	Mané 23'; Jonathan Soriano 55'; Schwegler (yellow card) 86'	Summary	Polverino (yellow card) 52'; Liendl 63'; Putsche (yellow card) 69'; Baldauf (yellow card) 79'; Sandro Gotal 87' (yellow card) 87'; Falk (yellow card) 88'	Stadium: Red Bull Arena; Attendance: 6,215; Referee: Gerhard Grobelnik

28 September 2013 Match 10	Rapid Wien	2–4	Wolfsberger AC	Vienna
19:00	Schaub 10'; Petsos 20'; Palla (yellow card) 84'	Summary	Liendl 30'; Sandro Gotal 51'; Topcagić 57'; Rnić 70'; Sollbauer (yellow card) 80'	Stadium: Gerhard Hanappi Stadium; Attendance: 12,200; Referee: Oliver Drachta

5 October 2013 Match 11	Wolfsberger AC	1–1	SV Ried	Wolfsberg, Carinthia
16:30	Rnić (yellow card) 45' (yellow-red card); Reifeltshammer 54' (o.g.)	Summary	Walch (yellow card) 39' (goal) 90'; Wieser (yellow card) 59'; Perstaller (yellow card) 61'; Reifeltshammer (yellow card) 72'; Trauner (yellow card) 81'	Stadium: Lavanttal-Arena; Attendance: 4,850; Referee: Alexander Harkam

19 October 2013 Match 12	Wolfsberger AC	1–1	SC Wiener Neustadt	Wolfsberg, Carinthia
19:00	Topcagić 48'; Sandro Gotal (yellow card) 64'	Summary	Rauter 5'; Wallner (yellow card) 62'; Freitag (yellow card) 90+1'	Stadium: Lavanttal-Arena; Attendance: 4,250; Referee: Harald Lechner

26 October 2013 Match 13	Wacker Innsbruck	1–2	Wolfsberger AC	Innsbruck
16:30	Hinterseer (yellow card) 19'; Andreas Kuen (yellow card) 32'; Wallner 68'	Summary	Topcagić 2'; Kerhe 36'; Polverino (yellow card) 77'	Stadium: Tivoli-Neu; Attendance: 4,921; Referee: Robert Schörgenhofer

2 November 2013 Match 14	Wolfsberger AC	1–1	SV Grödig	Wolfsberg, Carinthia
19:00	Rnić (yellow card) 20'; Liendl 60'	Summary	Salamon (yellow card) 13'; Boller (yellow card) 34'; Trdina 57'	Stadium: Lavanttal-Arena; Attendance: 4,800; Referee: Markus Hameter

9 November 2013 Match 15	Austria Wien	1–0	Wolfsberger AC	Vienna
19:00	Hosiner (yellow card) 50'; Murg 53' (yellow card) 90+2'; Kienast (yellow card) 78'; Šimkovič (yellow card) 90'	Summary	Sollbauer (yellow card) 66'; Polverino (yellow card) 78'; Hüttenbrenner (yellow card) 90+4'	Stadium: Franz Horr Stadium; Attendance: 8,000; Referee: Alexander Harkam

30 November 2013 Match 16	FC Admira Wacker Mödling	3–0	Wolfsberger AC	Maria Enzersdorf
19:00	Domoraud 25', 51'; Schicker 55'	Summary	Rnić (yellow card) 24'; Kerhe (yellow card) 60'	Stadium: Bundesstadion Südstadt; Attendance: 2,000; Referee: Oliver Drachta

4 December 2013 Match 17	Wolfsberger AC	1–2	Red Bull Salzburg	Wolfsberg, Carinthia
20:30	Polverino (yellow card) 43'; Liendl 58'; Sollbauer (yellow card) 82'	Summary	Alan Carvalho (yellow card) 49' (goal) 52'; Švento 87'	Stadium: Lavanttal-Arena; Attendance: 2,893; Referee: Manuel Schüttengruber

8 December 2013 Match 18	Wolfsberger AC	2–1	Rapid Wien	Wolfsberg, Carinthia
16:30	Baldauf (yellow card) 59'; Topcagić 61'; Liendl 74'	Summary	Burgstaller 52'	Stadium: Lavanttal-Arena; Attendance: 3,778; Referee: Rene Eisner

11 December 2013 Match 19	Wolfsberger AC	2–1	SK Sturm Graz	Wolfsberg, Carinthia
18:30	Liendl 24' (pen.); Putsche (yellow card) 34'; Offenbacher 54' (o.g.)	Summary	Beichler 28' (yellow card) 90'; Wolf (yellow card) 57'; Hütter (yellow card) 77'; Offenbacher (yellow card) 84'	Stadium: Lavanttal-Arena; Attendance: 5,264; Referee: Dominik Ouschan

14 December 2013 Match 20	SV Ried	1–3	Wolfsberger AC	Ried im Innkreis
19:00	Trauner (yellow card) 41' (yellow-red card); Möschl (yellow card) 45'; Gartler 88'; Walch (yellow card) 90+4'	Summary	Standfest 4'; Baldauf (yellow card) 14'; Liendl 22'; Polverino (yellow card) 40'; Kerhe 90+2'	Stadium: Keine Sorgen Arena; Attendance: 2,863; Referee: Andreas Kollegger

=== League table ===
Pos	Team	Pld	W	D	L	GF	GA	GD	Pts
5	Sturm Graz	36	13	9	14	55	55	0	48
6	Ried	36	10	13	13	55	66	−11	43
7	Wolfsberger AC	36	11	8	17	50	63	−13	41
8	Wiener Neustadt	36	10	9	17	43	84	−41	39
9	Admira Wacker Mödling	36	11	9	16	51	67	−16	37 (Note: Admira were deducted eight points because of violations of licensing regulations and requirements. After an appeal, it was changed to five points.)

Source: weltfussball.de (in German)
Rules for classification: 1) points; 2) goal difference; 3) number of goals scored.
