= Alexander Kofler =

Austrian footballer (born 1986)

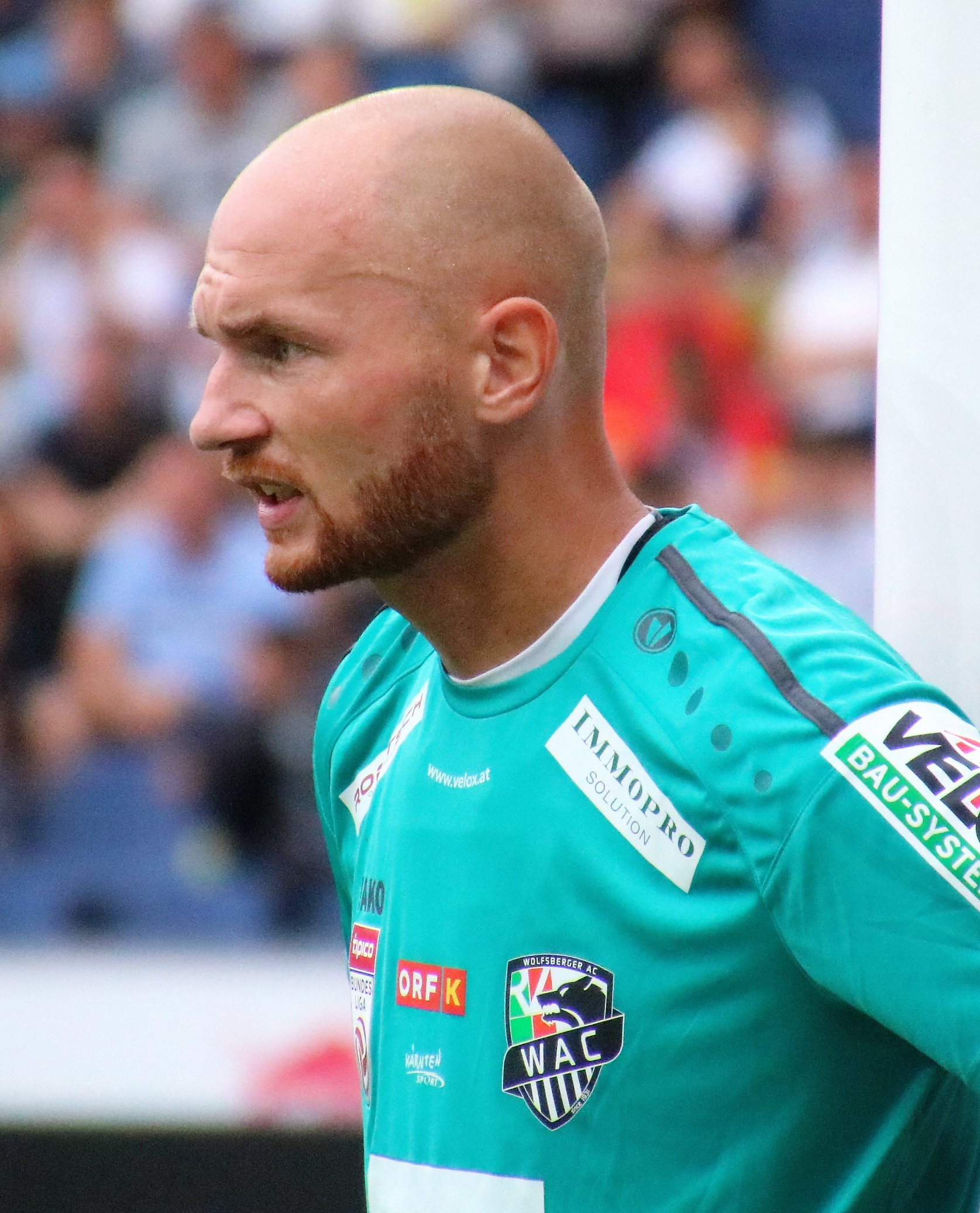
- Kofler in 2019

Personal information
- Date of birth: 6 November 1986 (age 40)
- Place of birth: Klagenfurt, Austria
- Height: 1.94 m (6 ft 4 in)
- Position: Goalkeeper

Team information
- Current team: ATUS Velden
- Number: 31

Youth career
- 1994–2004: ATUS Velden

Senior career*
| Years | Team | Apps | (Gls) |
| 2004–2006 | SC Landskron | | |
| 2006–2007 | ASKÖ Fürnitz | | |
| 2007–2010 | SAK Klagenfurt | 70 | (0) |
| 2010–2013 | SC Austria Lustenau | 99 | (0) |
| 2013–2022 | Wolfsberger AC | 215 | (0) |
| 2023– | ATUS Velden | 71 | (0) |
- * Club domestic league appearances and goals as of 27 June 2026

Alexander Kofler (born 6 November 1986) is an Austrian former professional footballer who plays as a goalkeeper for ATUS Velden.

== Career ==
=== Early career ===
Kofler began his football career in 1994 at ATUS Velden in Carinthia. For the 2004–05 season he moved to SC Landskron. For the 2006–07 season he joined the fifth-tier ASKÖ Fürnitz.

Ahead of the 2007–08 season, Kofler moved to Austrian Regionalliga club SAK Klagenfurt. In October 2007, he made his debut for the club against Wolfsberger AC. In his debut season in the third tier, he made 18 appearances for Klagenfurt. In the 2008–09 season he made 21 Regionalliga appearances. In the 2009–10 season he was a permanent starter for the Carinthians and completed 29 gamess for the club.

=== Austria Lustenau ===
Prior to the 2010–11 season, Kofler moved to second division club Austria Lustenau. In July 2010 he made his debut for Vorarlberg-based club in the second tier when he was substituted for Sascha Boller in the 79th minute on the third matchday of the season against SCR Altach, after goalkeeper Christian Mendes had been sent off with a red card. From then on, Kofler became the starter for the club, before he himself conceded a red card on 19 November 2010 against Wolfsberger AC. After returning from his suspension, he had to spend the first four games on the bench as the backup before he was able to regain the place as the regular starter. In his first season as a professional, he made 27 second division appearances, and reached the final of the Austrian Cup with Austria Lustenau, in which, however, they lost to Austrian Football Bundesliga club SV Ried. In the 2011–12 season he was again the regular starter and made 33 second division appearances. In the 2012–13 season, he made 28 appearances.

=== Wolfsberger AC ===
For the 2013–14 season, Kofler joined Austrian Football Bundesliga club Wolfsberger AC. He made his debut in the Bundesliga in August 2013, when he was brought into the game for the injured Christian Dobnik on the fourth matchday against Wacker Innsbruck at half-time. In his first season in Wolfsberg, he was the backup to Dobnik and made 6 Bundesliga appearances. For the 2014–15 season, he was able to beat out Dobnik to become the starter. So he came to 30 Bundesliga appearances and qualified for the UEFA Europa League with the club. In the qualifiers for the UEFA Europa League, he was part of the team beating Shakhtyor Soligorsk in second round, before they were knocked out in the third round to Borussia Dortmund. Kofler played all four qualifying matches. In the league, he lost his place in goal after the eleventh matchday to Dobnik. After the winter break, however, he was able to reassert himself again in goal. In the 2015–16 season, he made 25 league appearances.

In the 2016–17 season he started the season as the first goalkeeper, but as in the previous season, he lost his place to Dobnik, who replaced him after the ninth matchday. Shortly before the winter break, however, Kofler was able to replace him again. At the end of the season, he also served as captain for the club for the first time. In the 2016–17 season, as in the previous season, he made 25 Bundesliga appearances. In the 2017–18 season, he was demoted to the backup towards the end of the by interim head coach Robert Ibertsberger, and from the 30th matchday Dobnik and Marko Soldo were given priority. Under new head coach Christian Ilzer, Kofler became the undisputed starter, and kept that position throughout the 2018–19 season. With Wolfsberger AC, he also qualified for the group stage of the UEFA Europa League, finishing third in the league. In the Europa League, he also played in all six group matches the following season. Finishing last in Group J, however, the Carinthians were eliminated in the group stage. In the league, Kofler was still the starter in the 2019–20 season.

== Retirement ==
After spending nine years with Wolfsberger AC, Kofler announced his retirement from professional football on 12 May 2022. Upon retiring, he returned to his youth club ATUS Velden and planned on becoming a goalkeepers coach.
