= Louis Ngwat-Mahop =

Cameroonian footballer

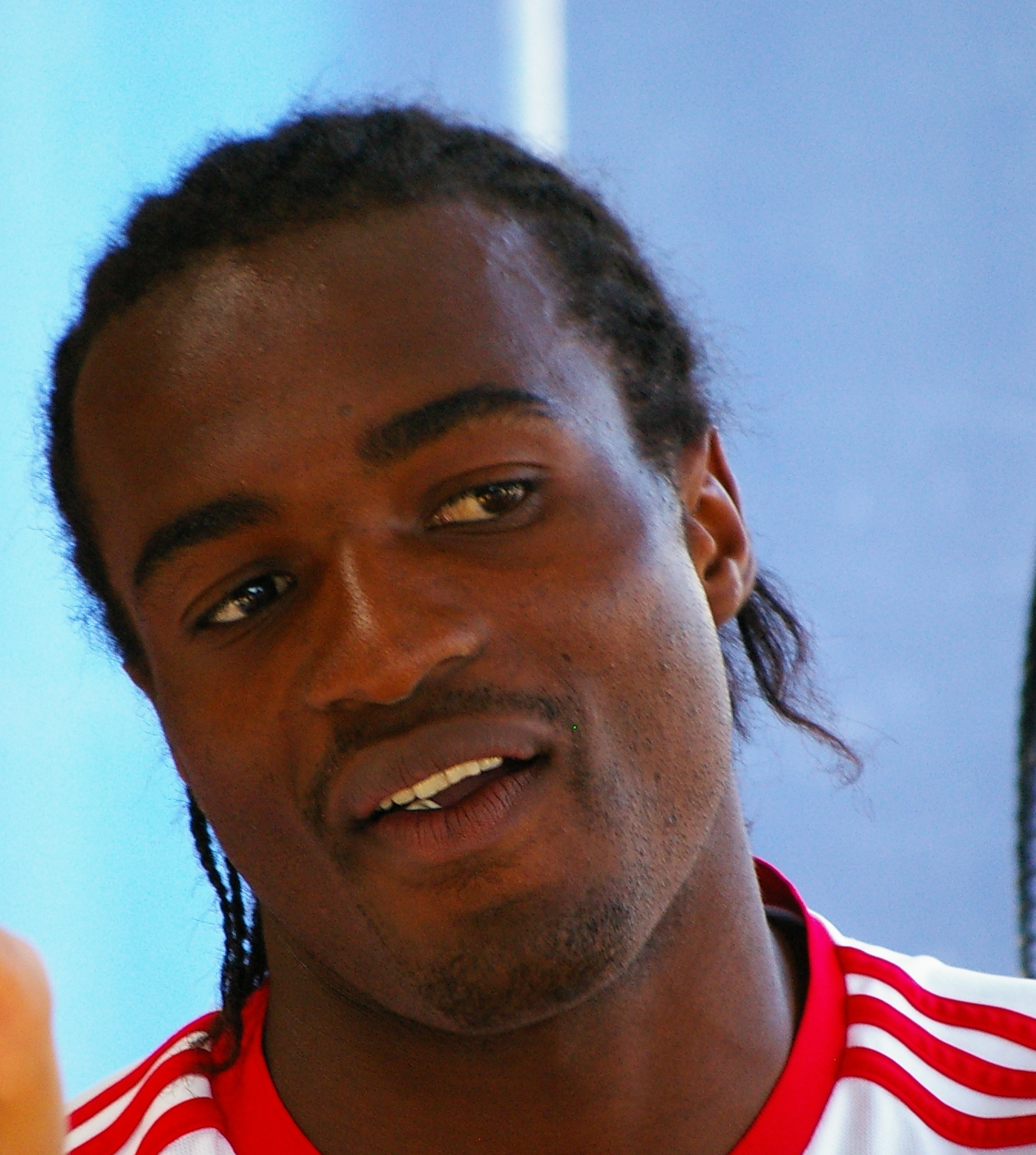
- Ngwat-Mahop with Salzburg in 2010

Personal information
- Full name: Louis Clément Ngwat-Mahop
- Date of birth: 16 September 1987 (age 39)
- Place of birth: Yaoundé, Cameroon
- Height: 1.86 m (6 ft 1 in)
- Position: Forward

Team information
- Current team: SCR Altach Juniors (manager)

Youth career
- 1993–2006: Dragon Club de Yaoundé

Senior career*
Years	Team	Apps	(Gls)
2006–2007	Bayern Munich II	33	(7)
2006–2007	Bayern Munich	1	(0)
2007–2010	Red Bull Salzburg	44	(4)
2007–2010	Red Bull Salzburg Juniors	18	(9)
2010–2011	Iraklis	10	(3)
2011–2012	Karlsruher SC	6	(1)
2012–2019	SCR Altach	169	(33)
2019–2020	SCR Altach Juniors	1	(0)
- * Club domestic league appearances and goals as of 13:52, 20 July 2019 (UTC)

Louis Clément Ngwat-Mahop (born 16 September 1987) is a Cameroonian professional footballer who plays for the junior team of Austrian side SCR Altach, combining his playing duties with being responsible for the integration of foreign and young players into the first team of the club. He plays as a forward or a right winger.

He started his career in his hometown's club Dragon Club de Yaoundé before being signed by German giants Bayern Munich in 2006. He played with them for one season, featuring mainly in matches of Bayern Munich II in the Regionalliga Süd. After being released by FC Bayern Munich in the summer of 2007, due to issues that arose with his French passport, he signed for Austrian club Red Bull Salzburg. At first he was assigned to play in the Regionalliga West with the club's reserve squad, Red Bull Salzburg Juniors, but he managed to make it to the first team. In total, Ngwat-Mahop spent three and a half years with the Austrian club, managing to win the Austrian Bundesliga in no less than two occasions. In January 2011 he signed for Super League Greece outfit Iraklis. He played for Karlsruher SC for the 2011–12 season before signing for Rheindorf Altach in 2012.

== Career ==
=== Early life and career ===
Ngwat-Mahop was born in Yaoundé on 16 September 1987, and grew up having Samuel Eto'o as his idol. He started his career for Cameroonian minnows Dragon Club de Yaoundé, being one of the most notable players ever to come out of the club.

=== Bayern Munich ===
In May 2006, he went on trial at Bayern Munich II. Hermann Gerland, the club's manager, was impressed by Ngwat-Mahop's athleticism and assertiveness and recommended his signing. Gerland characterised Ngwat-Mahop as a rough diamond. He made his debut for Bayern Munich II in the opening day of the 2006–07 Regionalliga season. He started the match, but he was brought out in the 62nd minute, in a match that Bayern II lost at home by a 0–2 scoreline by KSV Hessen Kassel. Ngwat-Mahop scored his first goal for Bayern II on 12 August 2006. It was the sole goal of the match, helping Bayern Munich II overcome the obstacle of Hoffenheim. Two weeks later, he managed to score once again, taking the credit for opening the score in a 4–4 goal glut against SV Elversberg. Ngwat-Mahop continued to play regularly for Bayern II until the end of the season, featuring in 33 matches, out of 34, all as a starter. He also added five more to his tally, to reach a total of seven goals in the 2006–07 Regionalliga campaign.

While approaching the closing stages of the season, his good performances with Bayern Munich II made Ottmar Hitzfeld, the manager of Bayern's first team, to call him to train with the professional squad. Due to the injuries of a lot of first team players, Ngwat-Mahop was included in Bayern's squad for a match against Borussia Mönchengladbach, although he did not get any playing time in that match. Ngwat-Mahop was also included in Bayern's squad for yet another match, this time against for an away contest against Energie Cottbus. In this match, on 12 May 2007, he was brought in, to replace Ali Karimi in the 88th minute, wearing number 38, to make his full professional debut for FC Bayern Munich, in what was an away 0–3 win for his team. That was his sole appearance in the Bundesliga for the 2006–07 season.

==== Passport issue ====
On 29 June 2007, just before Bayern's Asian tour in Hong Kong, Ngwat-Mahop found out that he had lost his French passport and started the procedure to get a new one, so he could follow his team in the tour. Upon his request, French authorities found out that Ngwat-Mahop's passport had the same number as that of a woman residing in Paris. After the Bayern Munich officials were informed of the passport issue they decided to terminate his contract. After that Ngwat-Mahop started travelling in France and Germany with the German police in his pursuit. Meanwhile, 1. FC Saarbrücken, having just been relegated from Regionalliga Süd, sued Bayern for an alleged 1 million € losses due to its relegation. 1. FC Saarbrücken asked FC Bayern Munich II to lose every game that Ngwat-Mahop was included. This would result in Bayern's II relegation instead of Saarbrücken. Saarbrücken finally lost the case in court, a case called ridiculous by Bayern's president Uli Hoeneß.

=== Red Bull Salzburg ===
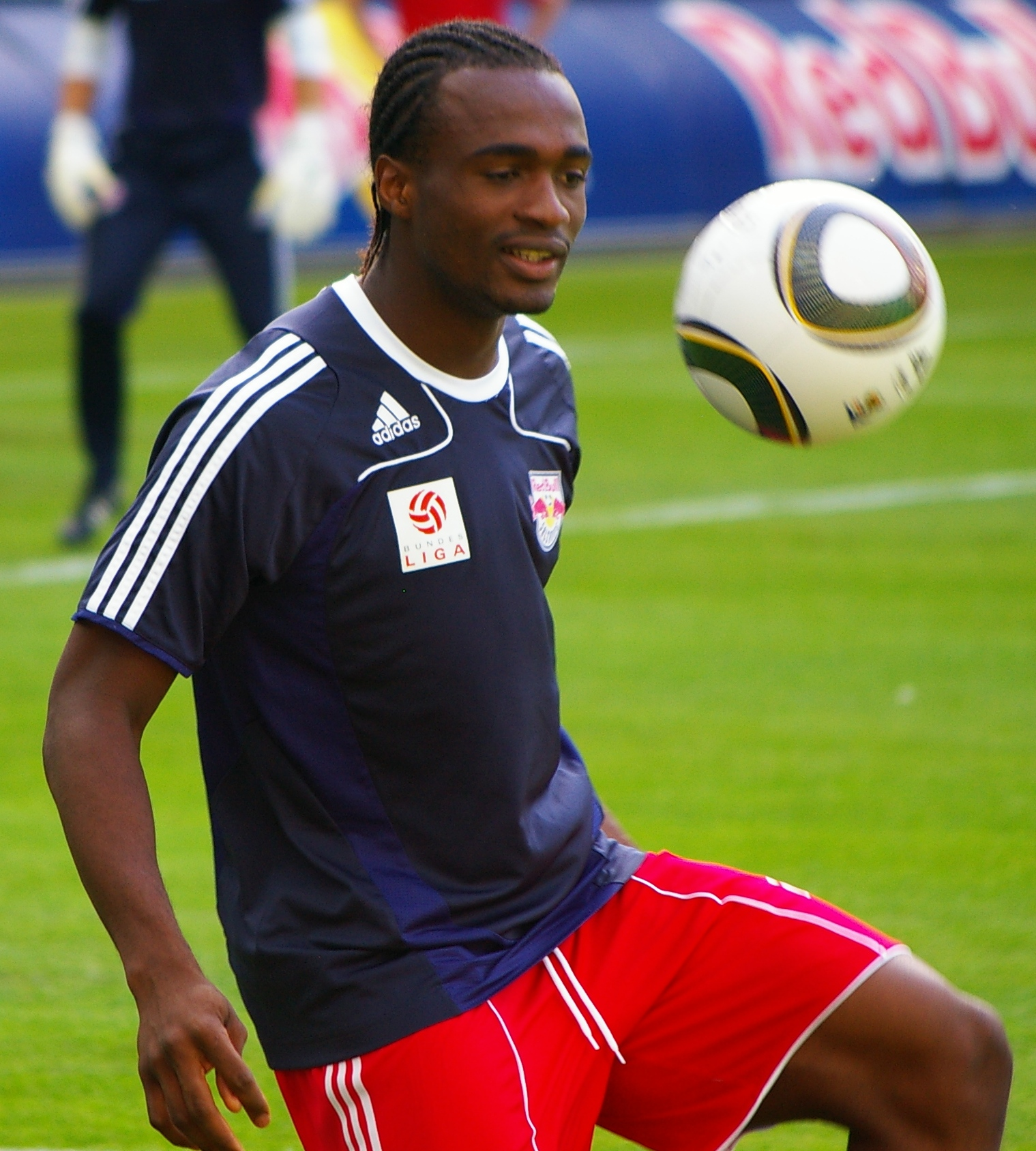
During a warm-up for Red Bull Salzburg.

After being released by FC Bayern Munich Ngwat-Mahop ended up as a trialist in Red Bull Salzburg. He managed to persuade FC Red Bull Salzburg's manager Giovanni Trapattoni of his football skills and he signed a two-year contract with the Austrian club. After the signing of his contract he was sent to Red Bull Salzburg Juniors to get playing time. There he made his debut in a 5–1 away defeat by FK Austria Wien II. In his second match with Red Bull Salzburg Juniors he handed two assists, to his teammates Vujic and Kitzbichler, to help them score the first and second goal of their team in a 2–2 home draw with SC-ESV Parndorf. He scored his first goal for his team in a 1–3 away win against DSV Leoben in the 70th minute after an assist by Öbster. In his next match Ngwat-Mahop scored once, in a 2–1 home win against Austria Lustenau. On 26 October, he netted a goal in the 80th minute of a 2–0 home win against Bad Aussee, to put the game beyond any doubt. In the next match against SK Schwadorf he proved himself a prolific forward by scoring the opening goal of the match, in the first minute, and serving the second to his teammate David Witteveen. Red Bull Salzburg Juniors finally lost the game by a 3–2 scoreline. Ngwat-Mahop continued scoring for his team in 2–1 home win against FK Austria Wien II, by scoring the opening goal of the match. Ngwat-Mahop featured in 13 matches and scored five goals for Red Bull Salzburg Juniors until the winter break. That resulted in him being called to play with FC Red Bull Salzburg's first team. After playing in some friendly matches with Red Bull Salzburg during the winter break, he made his league debut for the club on 23 February 2008, in a 3–1 away defeat from Austria Wien, as he replaced Alexander Zickler in the 52nd minute. Ngwat-Mahop continued to feature regularly in Red Bull Salzburg's playing squad until the end of the season, although mostly as a substitute. He also managed to score his first goal with Red Bull Salzburg in a 3–0 home win against Sturm Graz. At the end of the season he totalled one goal in 12 appearances. In April 2008, Ngwat-Mahop signed a contract extension with Red Bull Salzburg until the summer of 2011.

Ngwat-Mahop contributed greatly in his club's season opener, as he scored the fourth goal and assisted the sixth, in Red Bull Salzburg's 6–0 home devastation against SV Mattersburg. A few days later he added two more to his tally, as his club won Armenian club Banants by a 7–0 scoreline at home, for the first Qualifying round of the 2008–09 UEFA Cup. He once again scored in his club's first leg match for the second Qualifying round of the 2008–09 UEFA Cup, against Lithuanian club FK Sūduva. He continued his scoring trends three days later for the first round of the ÖFB-Cup, in a 1–4 away win against Pasching. It took him almost a month to find the net again, as he scored the last goal in his club's 4–2 home win against Vöcklabrucker SC for the 2nd round of the ÖFB-Cup. A week later he managed to score the opening goal, in Red Bull Salzburg's 2–2 away draw against Sturm Graz. Until the end of the season he featured regularly in his team's matches, although mostly as a substitute, and only managed to score one more goal in a 4–1 home win against Austria Kärnten. At the end he counted 36 appearances with Red Bull Salzburg, of which 27 in the Bundesliga, six in the UEFA Cup and three in the ÖFB-Cup. Out of these matches he scored a total of eight goals, of which three in the Bundesliga, three in the UEFA Cup and two in the ÖFB-Cup.

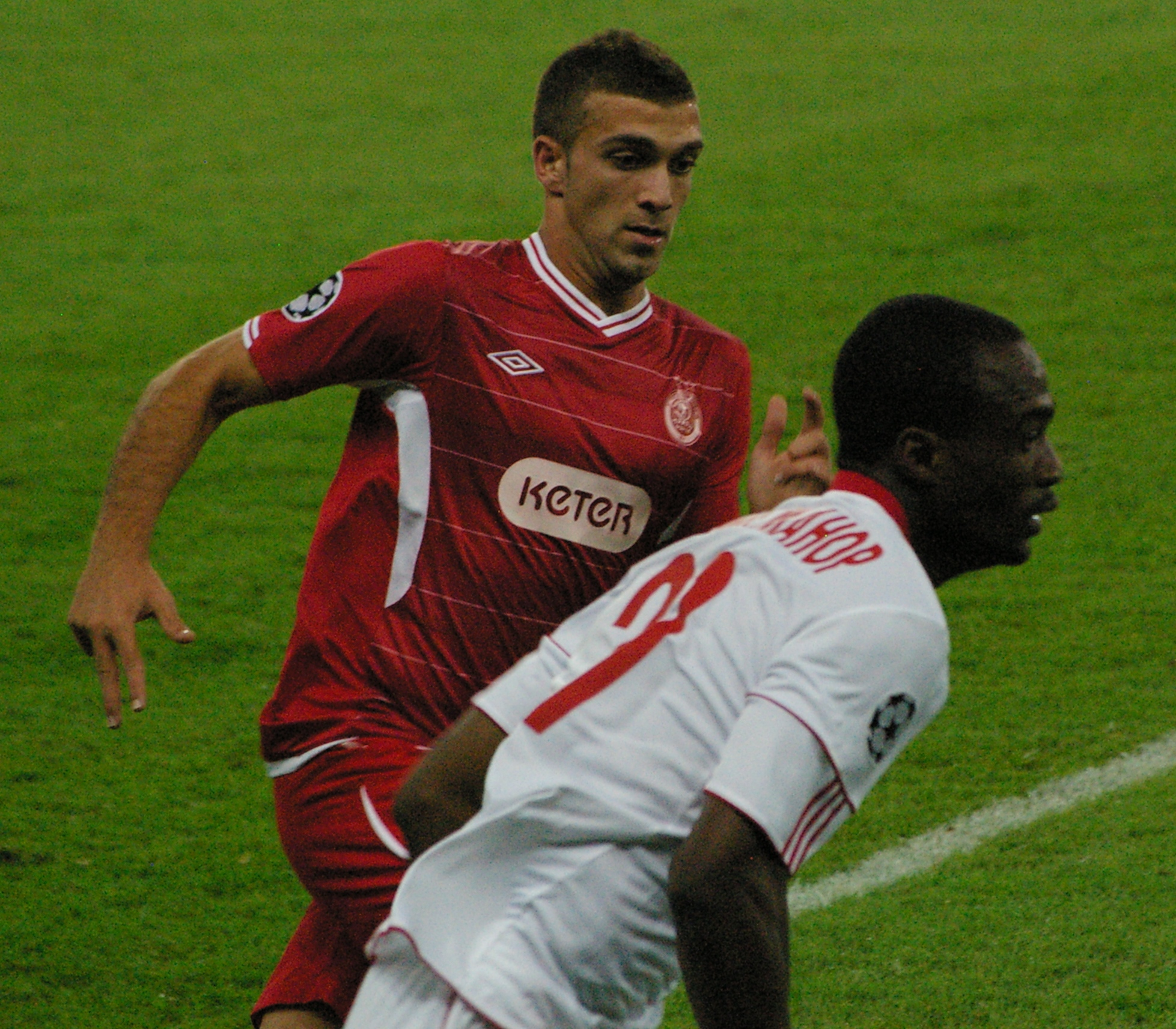
Playing for Red Bull Salzburg.

In the summer of 2009 there were rumours that 1860 Munich was interested in signing him. Finally Ngwat-Mahop stayed with Red Bull Salzburg and he featured in the whole match, in what was Red Bull Salzburg's first match of the season, a 1–1 home draw against Irish outfit Bohemians for the second Qualifying round of the 2009–2010 UEFA Champions League. He was, once again, a starter at Red Bull Salzburg' opening match of the 2009–10 Bundesliga season, but he was substituted in the 40th minute by his fellow countryman Somen Tchoyi. Later it was known that Ngwat-Mahop suffered a tear of the left anterior thigh muscle, an injury that would keep him out of action for months. He managed to fully heal from his injury and play again for Red Bull Salzburg almost nine months later, in a 4–2 home win against SC Magna Wiener Neustadt, as he came in as a late substitute for Somen Tchoyi. At the meantime Ngwat-Mahop played in five games for Red Bull Salzburg Juniors managing to score four goals, two of them in a single match, a 3–0 home win against SC Austria Lustenau. At the end of the season he had only managed to play in two league games and one European game for Red Bull Salzburg and did not score any goals.

Ngwat-Mahop played in Red Bull Salzburg's opening match for the 2010–11 Bundesliga season, on 17 July 2010, coming in as a substitute in the 57th minute, in what was a 0–0 away draw against SV Kapfenberg. Three days later he once again played as a substitute for Jakob Jantscher, in his team's second leg match, against Faroese champions HB Torshavn for the second Qualifying round of the 2010–11 UEFA Champions League. He scored his first goal of the season in a match for the 1st round of the ÖFB-Cup against St. Pölten II, that Red Bull Salzburg won by 1–4. On 24 August, he made the cross that resulted in Red BullSalzburg's goal, in his team's second leg match for the third Qualifying round of the 2010–11 UEFA Champions League against Hapoel Tel Aviv. Ngwat-Mahop was substituted in the 65th minute of a match that ended a 1–1 draw, resulting in Red Bull Salzburg's elimination. Later it was made known that he was again injured, and due to this he made his come back with Red Bull Salzburg almost three months later, in a 2–0 home win against Sturm Graz. That was meant to be Ngwat-Mahop's last game with the Red Bull Salzburg shirt, as in January he was sold to Super League outfit Iraklis for an undisclosed fee.

=== Iraklis ===
On 8 January 2011, Greek club Iraklis announced that it had signed Ngwat-Mahop until the summer of 2012. He debuted for the Greek club on 23 January 2011, as he was in the starting line-up in a 3–0 away defeat by AO Kavala. At the time he was substituted, in the 57th minute, the scoreline was 0–0. Ngwat-Mahop scored his first goal with Iraklis, by opening his club's tally in a 1–2 away win against Panserraikos. His goal was scored after an assist by teammate Karim Soltani and helped Iraklis to record its first away win in eleven months.

=== Karlsruher SC ===
In 2011, he returned to Germany, signing with Karlsruher SC. He made his league debut on 10 September 2011, where he scored the club's second consolation goal, in a 2–4 away defeat against Fortuna Düsseldorf.

=== SCR Altach ===
Ngwat-Mahop signed for SCR Altach in the summer of 2012. One day after his commitment with the club, on 7 August 2012, he made his debut in a 1–4 home defeat against St. Pölten, where he even managed to score his first goal. Throughout the season he appeared in 33 matches ending up being the club's second league goalscorer with 10 goals.

Ngwat-Mahop left the club at the end of the 2018–19 season. However, it was announced on 24 July 2019, that he would continue for the club's Junior team/reserve team to act there as a leader. In addition, Ngwat-Mahop would also be responsible for the integration of foreign and young players for the first team of the club.

== Career statistics ==
=== Club ===
As of 1 July 2019

Club	Season	League			Cup		League Cup		Continental		Total	
Club	Season	Division	Apps	Goals	Apps	Goals	Apps	Goals	Apps	Goals	Apps	Goals
Bayern Munich II	2006–07	3. Liga	33	7	—		—		—		33	7
Bayern Munich	2006–07	Bundesliga	1	0	—		—		—		1	0
Red Bull Salzburg Juniors	2007–08	Austrian Regionalliga West	13	5	—		—		—		13	5
Red Bull Salzburg Juniors	2009–10	Austrian Regionalliga West	5	4	—		—		—		5	4
Red Bull Salzburg Juniors	Total		18	9	0	0	0	0	0	0	18	9
Red Bull Salzburg	2007–08	Austrian Bundesliga	12	1	—		—		—		12	1
Red Bull Salzburg	2008–09	Austrian Bundesliga	27	3	3	2	—		6	4	36	9
Red Bull Salzburg	2009–10	Austrian Bundesliga	2	0	—		—		1	0	3	0
Red Bull Salzburg	2010–11	Austrian Bundesliga	3	0	1	1	—		4	0	8	1
Red Bull Salzburg	Total		44	4	4	3	0	0	11	4	59	11
Iraklis	2010–11	Super League Greece	10	3	—		—		—		10	3
Karlsruher SC	2011–12	2. Bundesliga	6	1	—		2	0	—		8	1
SCR Altach	2012–13	Austrian First League	33	10	2	1	—		—		35	11
SCR Altach	2013–14	Austrian First League	26	5	1	0	—		—		27	5
SCR Altach	2014–15	Austrian Bundesliga	31	8	4	2	—		—		35	10
SCR Altach	2015–16	Austrian Bundesliga	26	6	3	0	—		4	1	33	7
SCR Altach	2016–17	Austrian Bundesliga	28	4	2	0	—		—		30	4
SCR Altach	2017–18	Austrian Bundesliga	18	0	0	0	—		5	2	23	2
SCR Altach	2018–19	Austrian Bundesliga	7	0	0	0	—		0	0	7	0
SCR Altach	Total		169	33	12	3	0	0	9	3	190	39
Career total			281	57	16	6	2	0	20	7	319	70

== Honours ==
Red Bull Salzburg

- Austrian Football Bundesliga: 2008–09, 2009–10

Rheindorf Altach

- Austrian Football First League: 2013–14
