= Christian Falk (footballer) =

Austrian footballer

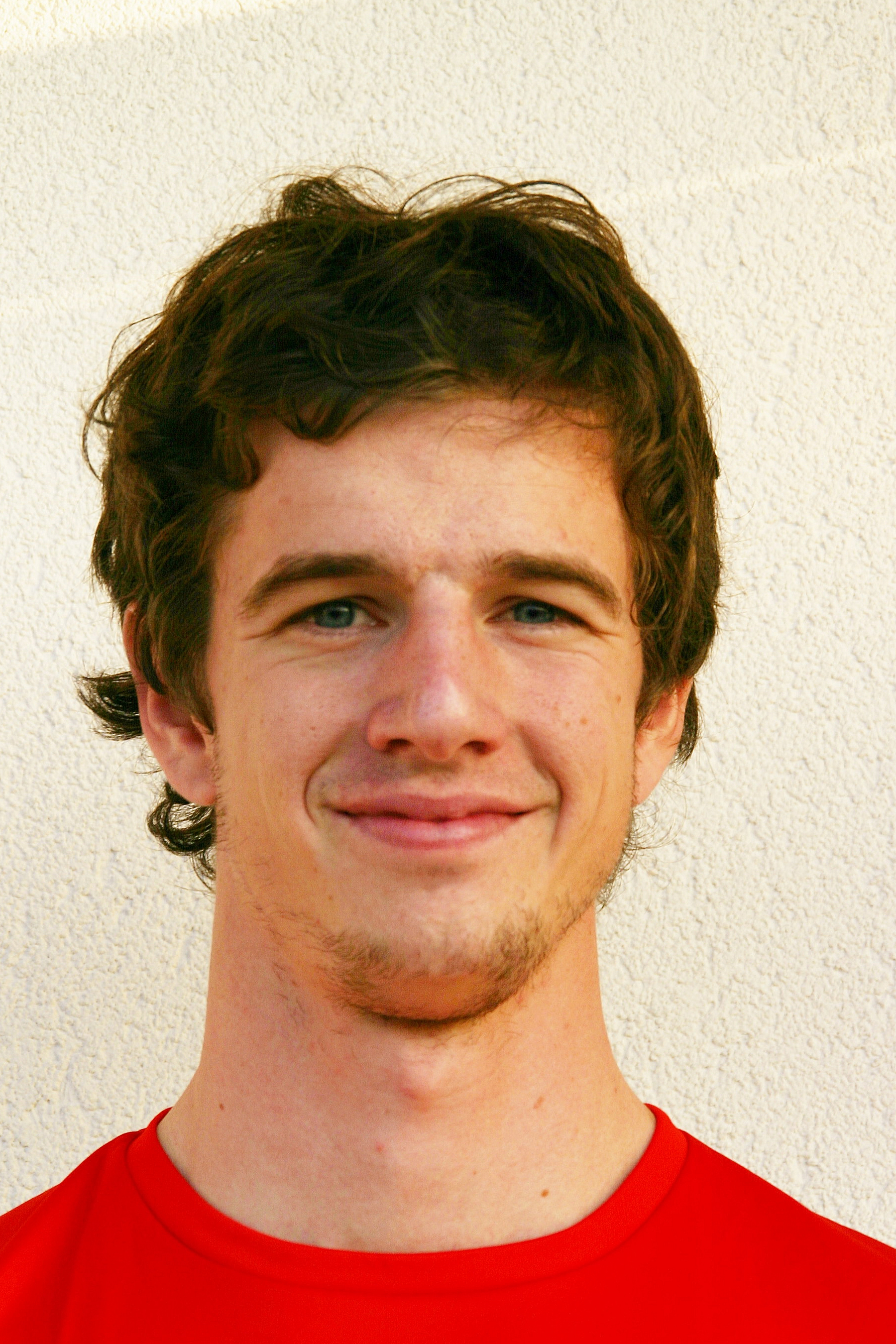

Personal information
- Full name: Christian Falk
- Date of birth: 1 April 1987 (age 39)
- Place of birth: Hartberg, Austria
- Height: 1.94 m (6 ft 4 in)
- Position: Striker

Youth career
- 1994–2004: Union Groß Steinbach

Senior career*
Years	Team	Apps	(Gls)
2004–2005	Union Groß Steinbach	?	(27)
2005–2008	TSV Hartberg	27	(4)
2008	SV Bad Aussee	8	(2)
2008–2009	Vöcklabrucker SC	23	(4)
2009–2014	Wolfsberger AC	124	(64)
2014–2015	Rot-Weiß Erfurt	20	(0)
2015–2016	SK Austria Klagenfurt	5	(1)
2016–2017	Blau-Weiß Linz	19	(1)
2017–2018	ASK Voitsberg	3	(0)
2018–2019	UFC Fehring		
- * Club domestic league appearances and goals

Christian Falk (born 1 April 1987) is an Austrian footballer who currently plays as a striker.

== Career ==
=== Club career ===
Before Falk moved to TSV Hartberg, he played for USV Großsteinbach. In the 2004/05 season he was the top scorer in the Gebietsliga Ost, with 27 goals and helped the team with promotion to the Unterliga Ost. With this achievement, TSV Hartberg became aware of him. The 194 centimeter tall striker then began his professional career in 2005 at TSV Hartberg. In 2008 he played briefly at SV Bad Aussee before he moved to Vöcklabrucker SC. From July 2009 he was under contract with Austrian Football Bundesliga club Wolfsberger AC.

For the 2014/15 season, Falk moved to FC Rot-Weiß Erfurt. There he was unable to assert himself and scored no goals in 20 appearances. In the 2015/16 season he moved to the Austrian Football Second League team SK Austria Klagenfurt. He scored in his first competitive game against FC Liefering (final score 4-0).

In August 2016 he moved to FC Blau-Weiß Linz, with whom he received a contract valid until June 2017. For the 2017/18 season he moved to ASK Voitsberg. In August 2018, he then joined UFC Fehring.
