= Martin Ehrenreich =

Austrian football defender

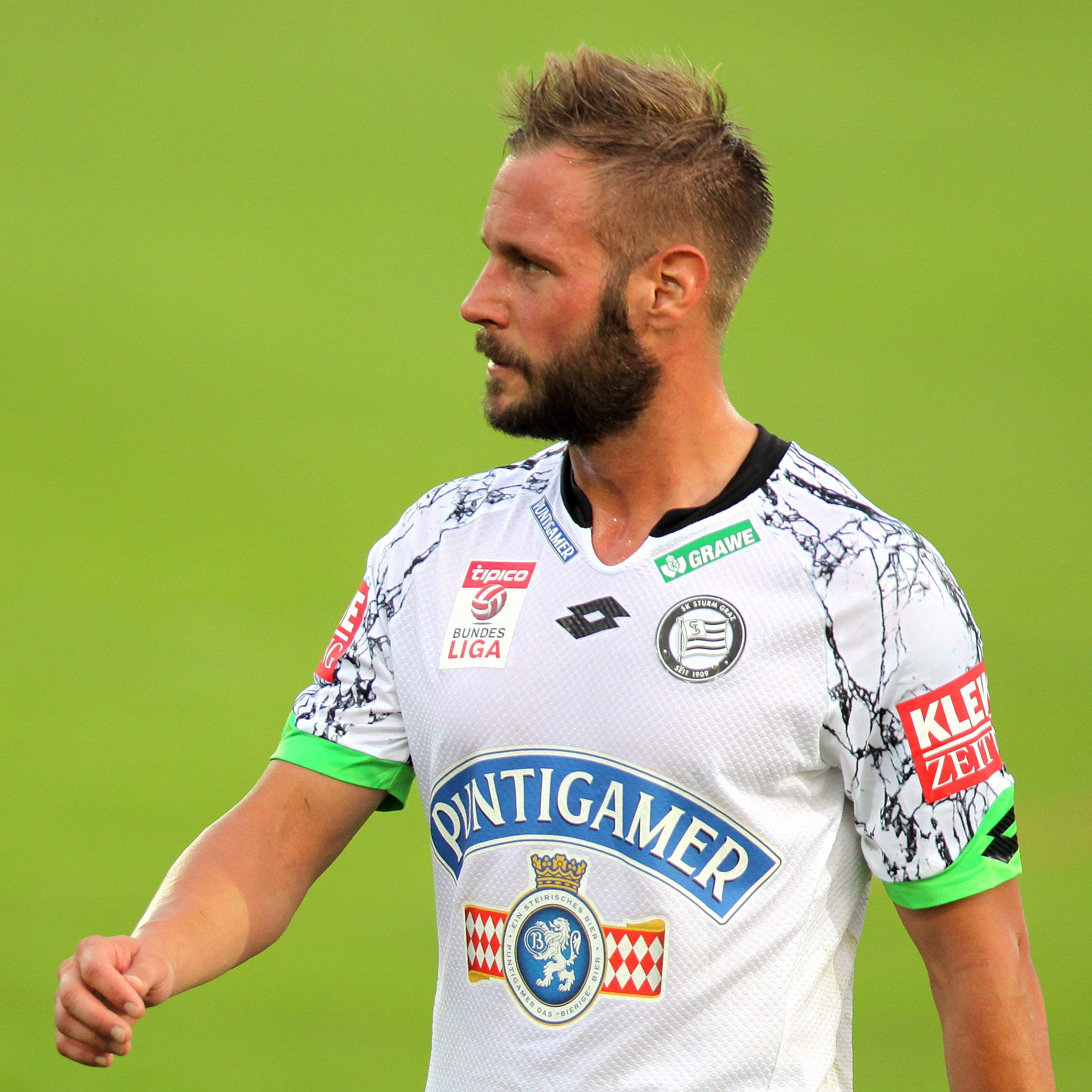

Personal information
- Date of birth: 10 May 1983 (age 43)
- Place of birth: Austria
- Height: 1.79 m (5 ft 10 1/2 in)
- Position: Centre back

Team information
- Current team: USV Hof (player); Sturm Graz (team manager)
- Number: 17

Youth career
- 1990–2002: DSV Leoben

Senior career*
| Years | Team | Apps | (Gls) |
| 2002–2005 | DSV Leoben | 4 | (0) |
| 2003 | → St. Veit (loan) | | |
| 2003–2004 | → Bad Aussee (loan) | | |
| 2004–2005 | → Lustenau 07 (loan) | | |
| 2005–2009 | FC Gratkorn | 121 | (8) |
| 2009–2016 | Sturm Graz | 119 | (4) |
| 2015–2020 | Sturm Graz II | 72 | (1) |
| 2020– | USV Hof | 2 | (0) |

Managerial career
- 2019–2020: Sturm Graz II (player-assistant)
- * Club domestic league appearances and goals as of 17:21, 27 December 2015 (UTC)

Martin Ehrenreich (born 10 May 1983) is an Austrian footballer, who plays as a centre back for USV Hof and is also the team manager of SK Sturm Graz.

== Career ==
=== Club career ===
Ehrenreich started his career at DSV Leoben, for which he played until the winter break of 2002/2003. In January 2003 he moved to FC St. Veit. After the end of the season he moved on to SV Bad Aussee, for which he completed one season. In 2004/05 he moved to FC Lustenau 07 and also played one season there. Then he came back to Styria for FC Gratkorn.

At the end of the 2008/09 season he moved to the two-time Austrian champions SK Sturm Graz. Ehrenreich made his Austrian Bundesliga debut on 30 August 2009 in a 2-1 away win over SV Ried, which suffered a defeat for the first time after more than 20 unbeaten home games in a row. In the game he was substituted on in the 81st minute for Andreas Hölzl and five minutes later gave the also substitute Haris Bukva the winning ball for the 2-1 goal. Ehrenreich scored his first two goals in the Bundesliga on 27 November 2011 when he played against Admira Wacker. After his substitution at break, he scored two goals within eleven minutes.

=== Later career ===
In the summer of 2016, he finished his professional career, in order to switch to the management of SK Sturm and continue to play for the club's reserve team. Since then he became involved in marketing and sponsoring at the club, as a part of the club's marketing staff.

In the summer 2019, Ehrenreich was appointed assistant coach of the club's reserve team, which he also still was active for as a player. A year later, in the summer 2020, Ehrenreich moved to USV Hof and was, at the same time, also hired in a new role at Sturm as team manager for the club's team in the Austrian Bundesliga.
