= Nenad Jovanović =

Nenad Jovanović may refer to:

- Nenad Jovanović (footballer, born 1979), Austrian-Serbian footballer
- Nenad Jovanović (footballer, born 1988), Serbian footballer
- Nenad M. Jovanovich (born 1974), Serbian Orthodox deacon
