= Zachhuber =

Zachhuber is a German surname. Notable people with the surname include:

- Andreas Zachhuber (born 1962), German footballer and manager
- Eric Zachhuber (born 1993), Austrian footballer
