= Manuel Kerhe =

Austrian footballer (born 1987)

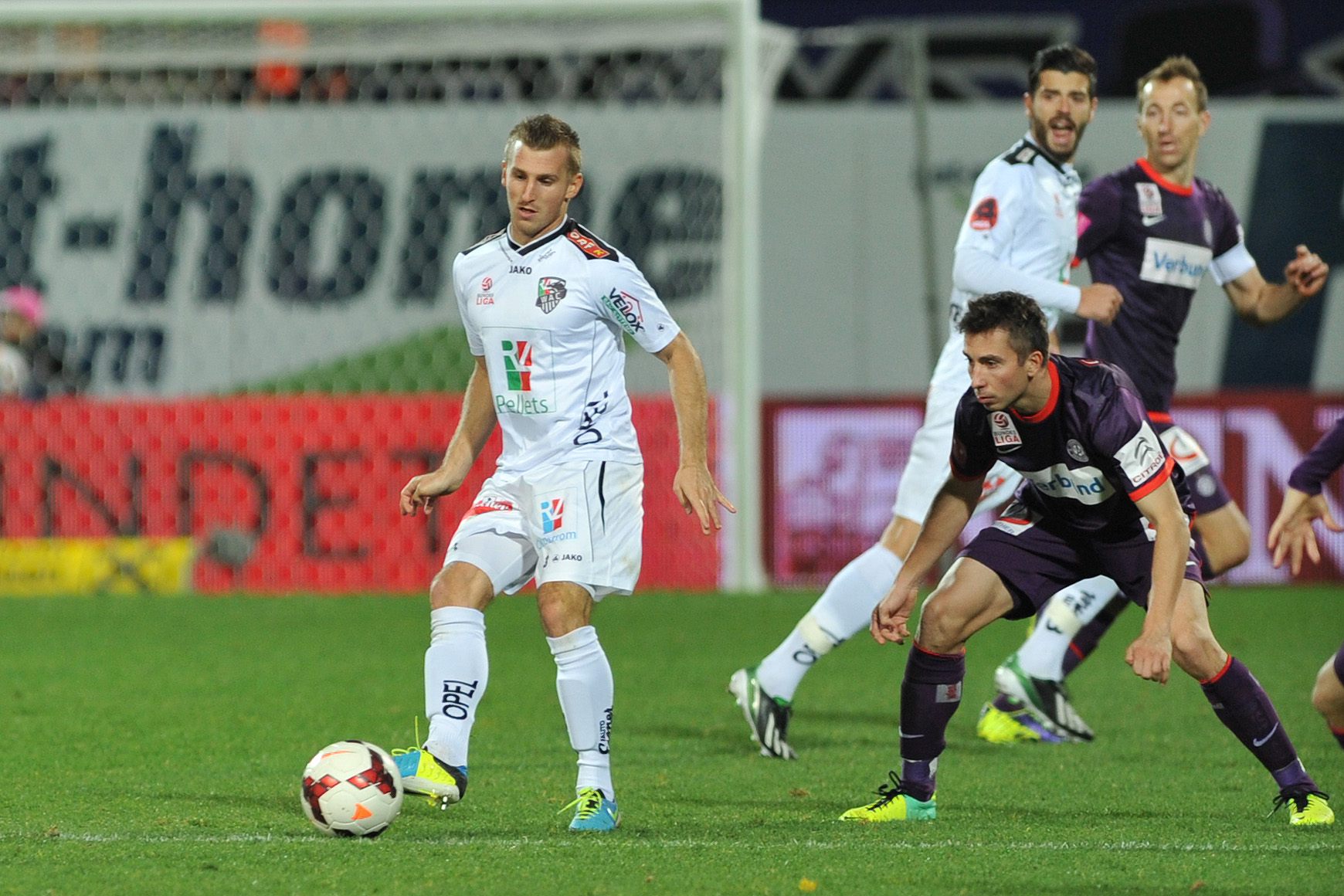

Personal information
- Full name: Manuel Kerhe
- Date of birth: 3 June 1987 (age 39)
- Place of birth: Sankt Veit an der Glan, Austria
- Height: 1.72 m (5 ft 8 in)
- Positions: Right midfielder; right back

Team information
- Current team: SV Ried II
- Number: 18

Youth career
- 1995–2004: SK Treibach

Senior career*
Years	Team	Apps	(Gls)
2004–2011	SK Treibach		
2007–2008	→ SV Bad Aussee (loan)	22	(1)
2008–2009	→ SV Grödig (loan)	28	(0)
2009–2011	→ Wolfsberger AC (loan)	63	(4)
2011–2015	Wolfsberger AC	134	(17)
2015–2017	LASK Linz	56	(10)
2017–2021	SV Ried	101	(4)
2021–	SV Ried II	7	(0)
- * Club domestic league appearances and goals as of 28 August 2021

Manuel Kerhe (born 3 June 1987) is an Austrian footballer who plays for SV Ried II.
