= Eric Zachhuber =

Austrian footballer

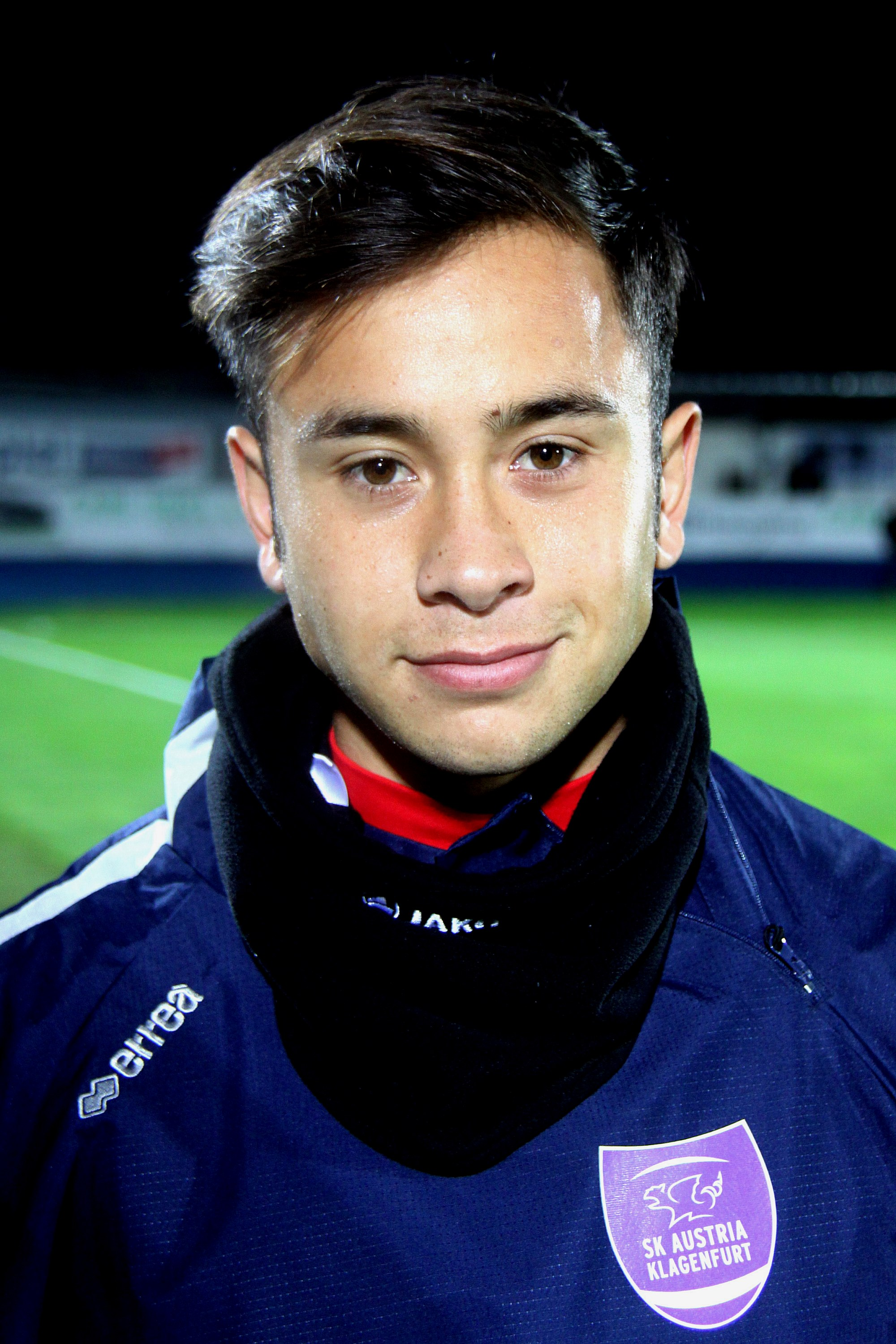

Personal information
- Date of birth: 27 September 1993 (age 33)
- Place of birth: Austria
- Height: 1.74 m (5 ft 8 1/2 in)
- Position: Midfielder

Team information
- Current team: SK St. Magdalena
- Number: 19

Senior career*
Years	Team	Apps	(Gls)
2011	FC Pasching	6	(0)
2011–2013	Rheindorf Altach II	18	(1)
2012	Rheindorf Altach	15	(0)
2013–2014	SV Wallern	28	(2)
2014–2015	Austria Lustenau	30	(1)
2015–2016	Austria Klagenfurt	31	(0)
2016–2020	SV Wallern		
2020–	SK St. Magdalena	3	(0)
- * Club domestic league appearances and goals as of 11:23, 26 October 2020 (UTC)

Eric Zachhuber (born 27 September 1993) is an Austrian footballer who plays for SK St. Magdalena.

== Honours ==
Altach

Runner-up

- Austrian Football First League (2): 2011–12, 2012–13
