= Stephan Stückler =

Austrian footballer

Personal information
- Full name: Stephan Stückler
- Date of birth: October 31, 1985 (age 41)
- Place of birth: Grafenstein, Austria
- Height: 1.73 m (5 ft 8 in)
- Position: Striker

Team information
- Current team: SC Ritzing

Youth career
- 1997–2002: AKA Kärnten

Senior career*
Years	Team	Apps	(Gls)
2002–2004	FC Kärnten	3	(0)
2004–2006	LASK Linz	15	(0)
2006–2007	SV Bad Aussee	27	(8)
2007–2008	SV Feldkirchen	15	(7)
2008	SK Austria Kärnten	1	(0)
2008–2009	FC St. Veit	27	(9)
2009–2013	Wolfsberger AC	103	(25)
2013–2014	TSV Hartberg	10	(1)
2014–	SC Ritzing		
- * Club domestic league appearances and goals as of 24 April 2014

Stephan Stückler (born October 31, 1985, in Grafenstein) is an Austrian footballer who currently plays as a striker for SC Ritzing.
