= Michele Polverino =

Swiss footballer (born 1984)

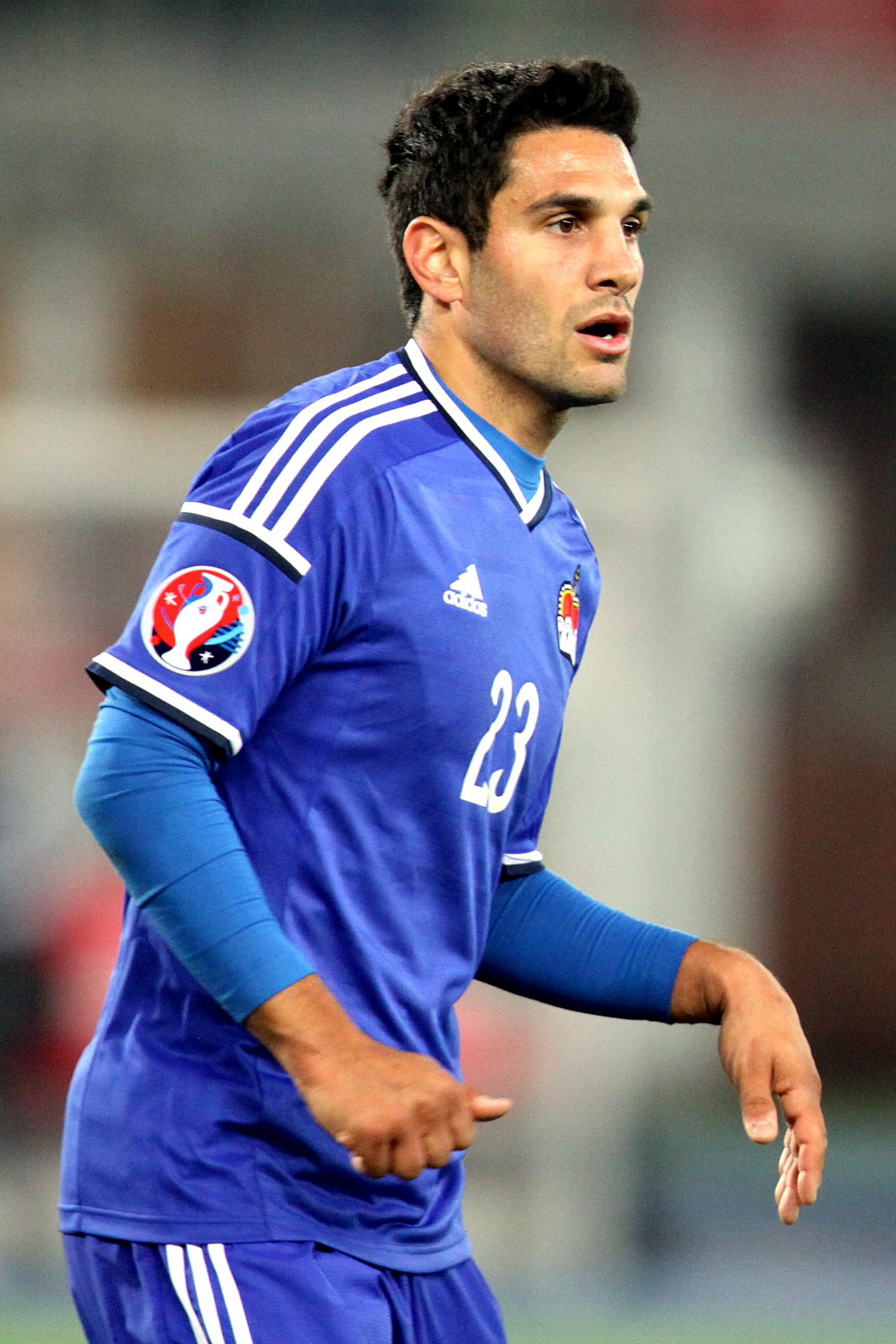
- Polverino with Liechtenstein in 2015

Personal information
- Date of birth: 26 September 1984 (age 42)
- Place of birth: Grabs, Switzerland
- Height: 1.76 m (5 ft 9 in)
- Position: Midfielder

Team information
- Current team: USV Eschen/Mauren (manager)

Youth career
- 1996–2002: FC Schaan

Senior career*
Years	Team	Apps	(Gls)
2002–2005	FC Vaduz	60	(8)
2005–2006	Olbia Calcio	26	(1)
2006–2009	FC Vaduz	60	(4)
2009–2011	FC Aarau	51	(0)
2011–2012	Steel Azin	?	(?)
2012–2014	Wolfsberger AC	53	(0)
2014–2015	FC Vaduz	4	(0)
2015–2016	SV Ried	34	(0)
2016	FC Rapperswil-Jona	3	(0)
2016–2022	FC Balzers	69	(9)

International career
2007–2019	Liechtenstein	79	(6)

Managerial career
- 2019–2022: FC Balzers (Assistant manager)
- 2022–2023: FC Balzers
- 2024–2025: USV Eschen/Mauren (Assistant manager)
- 2025–: USV Eschen/Mauren
- * Club domestic league appearances and goals

Michele Polverino (born 26 September 1984) is a Liechtensteiner professional football manager and former player who played as a midfielder. He is currently manager of USV Eschen/Mauren. Born in Switzerland, he made 79 appearances for the Liechtenstein national team scoring six goals.

== Club career ==
=== FC Schaan ===
Polverino played for the youth teams of FC Schaan until he was 18, when he moved to FC Vaduz

=== FC Vaduz ===
He joined FC Vaduz in the summer of 2002, making 11 league appearances in his first season in the Swiss Challenge League (then known as the Nationalliga B). He remained with Vaduz until the end of the 2004–05 season, making 60 league appearances and scoring 8 goals.

=== Olbia Calcio ===
For the 2005–06 season, Polverino played for Olbia Calcio of Serie C2, making 26 league appearances and scoring 1 goal as the club narrowly avoided relegation by winning the relegation playoff.

=== Second spell with FC Vaduz ===
Polverino rejoined Vaduz at the end of the 2005–06 season. He was part of the FC Vaduz squad that won promotion to the Swiss Super League for the first time in the club's history in the 2007–08 season. He left at the end of the 2008–09 season, after the club was relegated back to the Swiss Challenge League.

=== FC Aarau ===
At the start of the 2009–10 season, Polverino joined FC Aarau of the Swiss Super League. At the end of the season the club was relegated down to the second tier, with Polverino leaving at the end of the 2010–11 season. He played 51 league matches for Aarau

=== Steel Azin ===
Polverino spent one season at Steel Azin of the Iranian Azadegan League (2nd tier of Iranian football). He was part of the squad that initially finished 3rd in the league, but the team was docked 12 points by FIFA and relegated to the 3rd tier.

=== Wolfsberger AC ===
Polverino joined Wolfsberger AC of the Austrian Bundesliga in 2012, making 53 league appearances and 6 appearances in the ÖFB-Cup in his 2 seasons with the club.

=== Third spell with FC Vaduz ===
For the 2014–15 season, Polverino returned again to FC Vaduz, however he made just 4 league appearances for the club and left at the end of the season

=== FC Rapperswil-Jona ===
Polverino joined Rapperswil-Jona for two months in 2016, making 3 league appearances

=== FC Balzers ===
Polverino joined FC Balzers, a Liechtenstein club playing in the Swiss 1st League (4th tier), in 2016.

=== Retirement ===
Polverino announce officially retirement from football after 2021–22 season.

== International career ==
Polverino made his international debut on 2 June 2007, in a 1–1 draw with Iceland in EURO 2008 qualifying.

On 17 November 2019, Polverino announced he was to retire from international football after the EURO 2020 qualifying match against Bosnia and Herzegovina. The game was his 79th and final cap for his country.

== Managerial career ==
In 2019, Polverino signed to FC Balzers as Assistant manager. In 2022, he promoted to manager of same club.

In 2024, Polverino appointment Assistant manager of USV Eschen/Mauren. On 2 February 2025, he appointment of manager at same club.

== Career statistics ==
Scores and results list Liechtenstein's goal tally first.

#	Date	Venue	Opponent	Score	Result	Competition
1.	9 September 2009	Rheinpark Stadion, Vaduz, Liechtenstein	Finland	1–1	1–1	2010 FIFA World Cup qualification
2.	9 February 2011	Stadio Olimpico, Serravalle, San Marino	San Marino	1–0	1–0	Friendly
3.	3 June 2011	Rheinpark Stadion, Vaduz, Liechtenstein	Lithuania	2–0	2–0	UEFA Euro 2012 qualification
4.	22 March 2013	Rheinpark Stadion, Vaduz, Liechtenstein	Latvia	1–0	1–1	2014 FIFA World Cup qualification
5.	14 August 2013	Rheinpark Stadion, Vaduz, Liechtenstein	Croatia	2–2	2–3	Friendly
6.	14 December 2017	Hamad bin Khalifa Stadium, Doha, Qatar	Qatar	2–1	2–1	Friendly

== Managerial statistics ==
As of the start from 2025–26 season.

Team	From	To	Record				
Team	From	To	G	W	D	L	Win %
FC Balzers	1 July 2022	25 September 2023	39	20	8	11	51.28
USV Eschen/Mauren	2 February 2025	Present	15	6	2	7	40.00
Total			54	26	10	18	48.15

== Honours ==
- U-15 Swiss Cup-winner
- Promotion with FC Vaduz to the Axpo Super League
