= Mario Kröpfl =

Association footballer

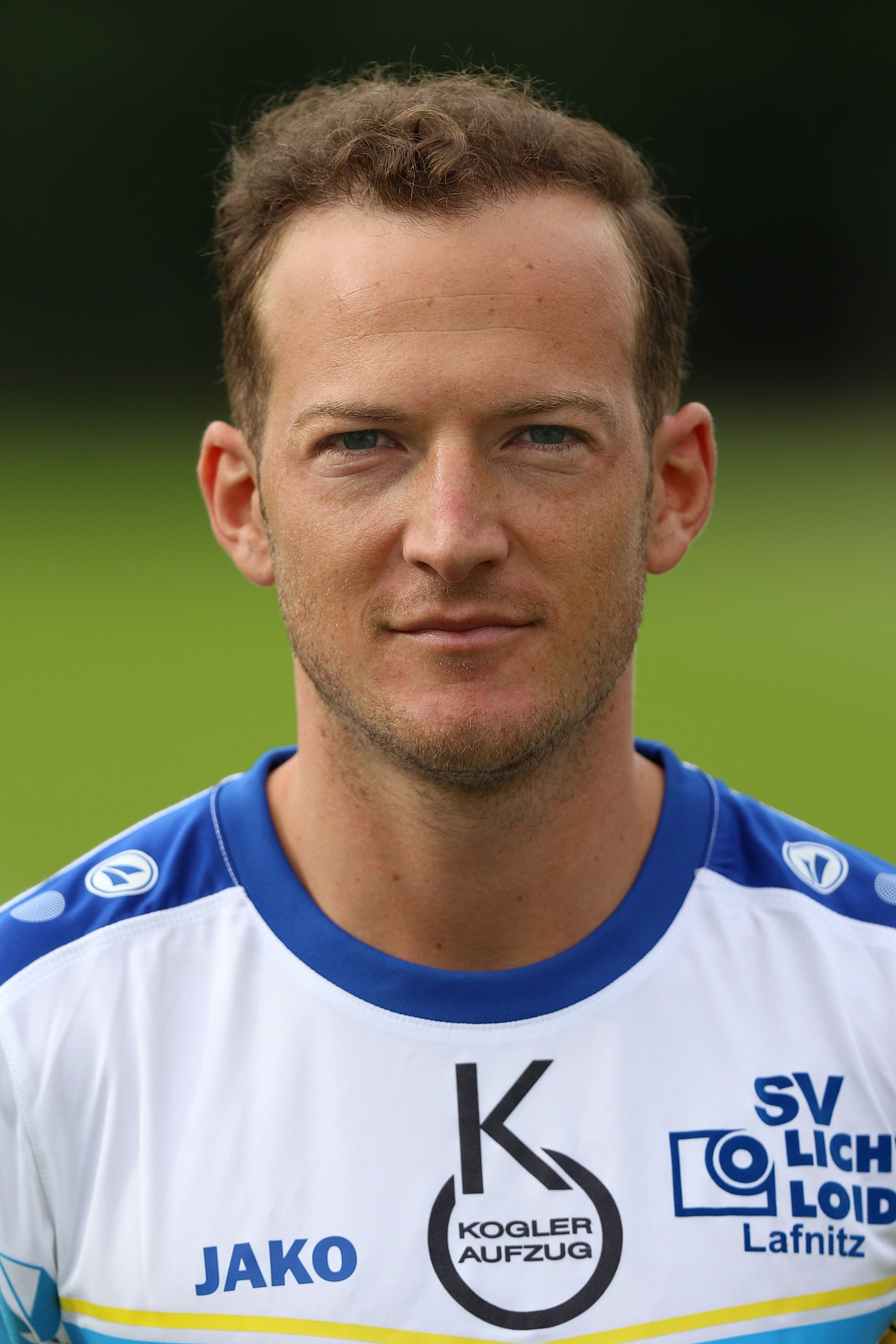

Personal information
- Date of birth: 21 December 1989 (age 36)
- Place of birth: Klagenfurt, Austria
- Height: 1.82 m (6 ft 0 in)
- Position: Midfielder

Team information
- Current team: ATUS Velden
- Number: 7

Youth career
- 1994–1996: Atus Pörtschach
- 1996–2008: Austria Kärnten

Senior career*
Years	Team	Apps	(Gls)
2008–2010	Austria Kärnten	15	(0)
2010–2011	FC Gratkorn	25	(4)
2011–2014	Wolfsberger AC	21	(0)
2011–2014	Wolfsberger AC II	20	(7)
2014–2015	SV Horn	34	(1)
2015–2022	SV Lafnitz	176	(65)
2022–2024	TSV Hartberg	14	(0)
2024–	ATUS Velden	57	(13)
- * Club domestic league appearances and goals as of 27 June 2026

Mario Kröpfl (born 21 December 1989) is an Austrian professional footballer who plays as a midfielder for ATUS Velden in the Third-tier Regionalliga Mitte.

== Club career ==
In late 2021, Kröpfl signed a contract with TSV Hartberg until the summer of 2024.
