= Christian Mendes =

Brazilian football player and manager (born 1972)

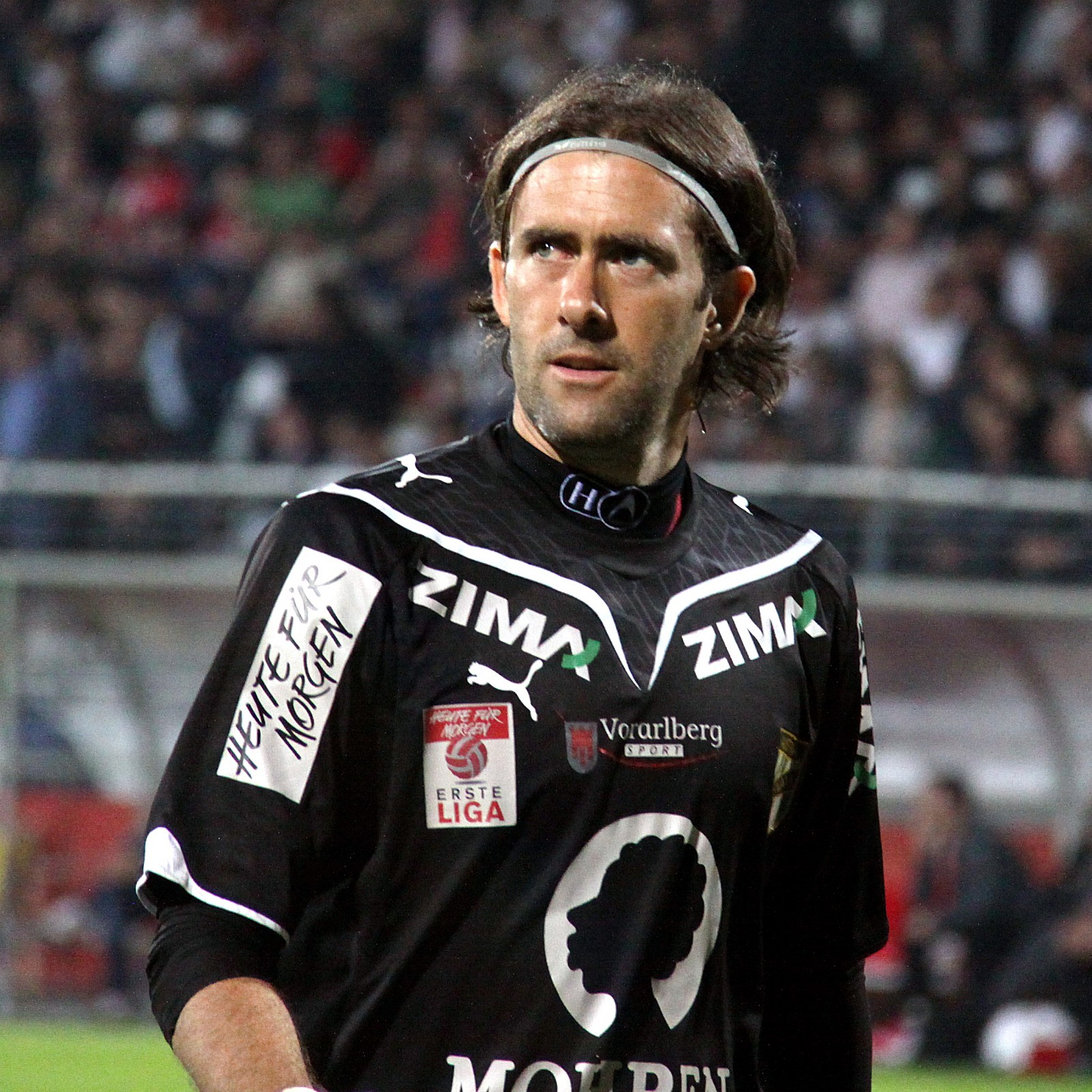
- Mendes in 2011

Personal information
- Full name: Christian Mendes Cavalcanti
- Date of birth: 23 December 1972 (age 53)
- Place of birth: Rio de Janeiro, Brazil
- Height: 1.81 m (5 ft 11 in)
- Position: Goalkeeper

Team information
- Current team: FC Hörbranz
- Number: 1

Youth career
- Palestra

Senior career*
Years	Team	Apps	(Gls)
1991–1998	São Caetano	80	(0)
1999–2004	FC Lustenau 07	175	(2)
2004–2005	FC Kreuzlingen	35	(0)
2005–2006	Chur 97	28	(0)
2006–2007	FC Höchst	35	(0)
2007–2008	Austria Lustenau	31	(0)
2008–2009	FC Höchst	33	(0)
2009–2014	Austria Lustenau	147	(0)
2014–2015	SC Röthis	50	(0)
2015	DSV Dornbirn	17	(0)
2016–2019	FC 08 Villingen	78	(0)
2019–2020	1. FC Rielasingen-Arlen	19	(0)
2020–2021	FC Arbon 05		
2021	VfB Bezau	0	(0)
2021	FC St. Margrethen		
2022–	FC Hörbranz	31	(0)

Managerial career
- 2015: Austria Lustenau II
- 2011: SC Göfis
- 2016: FC Singen
- 2021: VfB Bezau
- * Club domestic league appearances and goals as of 07:32, 6 April 2023 (UTC)

Christian Mendes Cavalcanti (born 23 December 1972) is a Brazilian footballer who plays as a goalkeeper for Vorarlbergliga club FC Hörbranz. He has also worked as a player-coach. He holds Austrian citizenship.

== Playing career ==
Mendes started his football career in his native Brazil, playing for Palestra and São Caetano. He then moved to Austria, where he played most of his career in the lower tiers of Austrian football, mainly in the province of Vorarlberg, beside stints in Switzerland and Germany. Most notably, he had two spells with Austria Lustenau and also worked for the club as a youth coach.

After Mendes was dismissed as player-coach at VfB Bezau, he began playing for FC St. Margrethen in the summer of 2021 at the age of 48. In October 2021, it was announced that Mendes would move to FC Hörbranz from January 2022. He made his debut for Hörbranz on 19 March 2022, starting in a 1–0 loss to SK Meiningen.

== Managerial career ==
In January 2015, Mendes was appointed head coach of SC Göfis in the Vorarlbergliga; his first managerial job. He was dismissed in May 2015.

In January 2016, he took over as head coach of FC Singen 04 in the German Verbandsliga Südbaden, functioning as a player-coach. The club finished bottom of the league table in the 2015–16 season.

Mendes became head coach of VfB Bezau on 3 May 2021. He only coached the team through five matches in the Vorarlbergliga before being dismissed in August 2021.
