= Gernot Suppan =

Austrian footballer

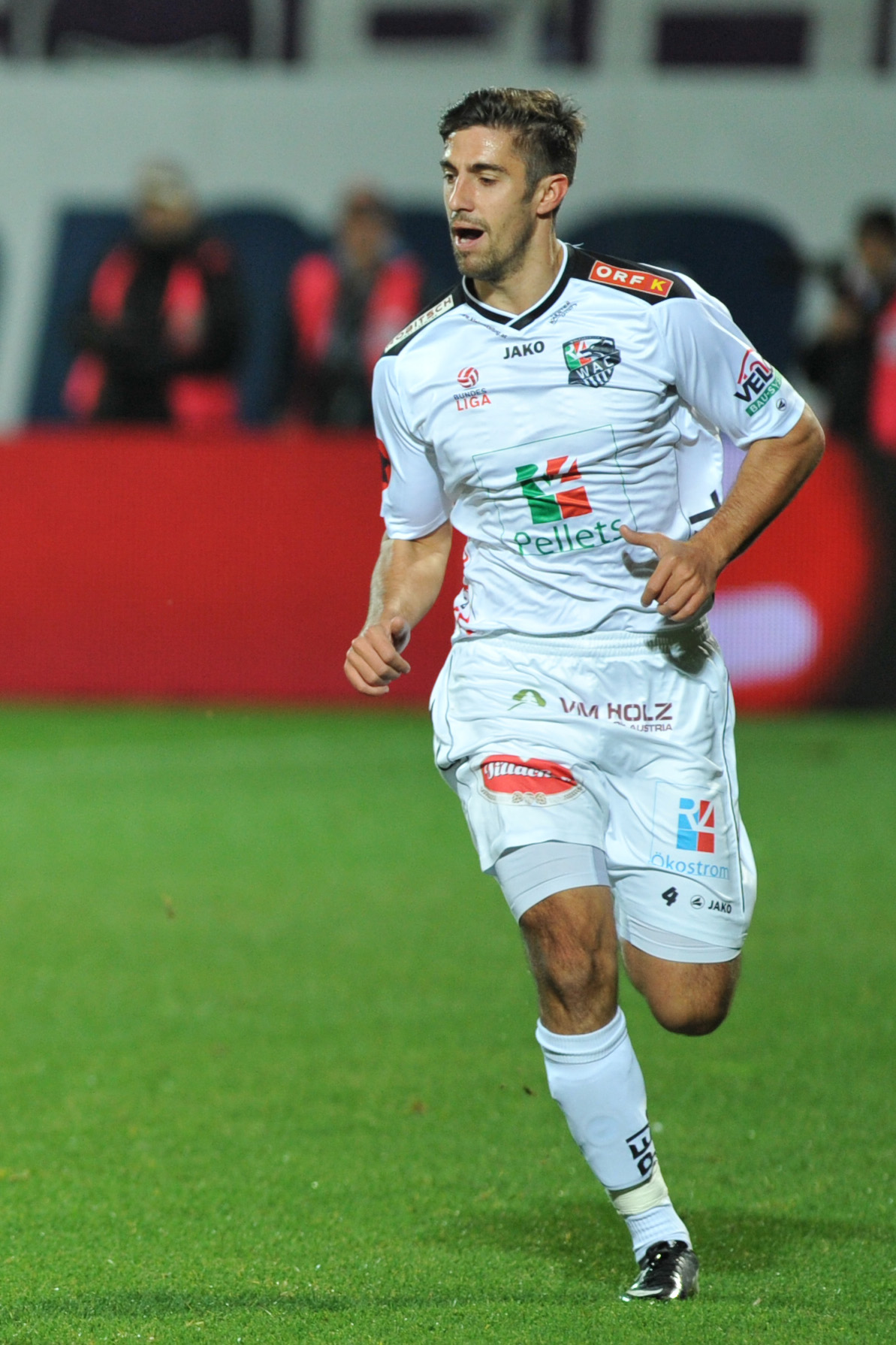

Personal information
- Date of birth: 18 November 1985 (age 40)
- Place of birth: Graz, Austria
- Height: 1.83 m (6 ft 0 in)
- Position: Left back

Team information
- Current team: ASK Voitsberg
- Number: 6

Youth career
- 1992–1994: LUV Graz
- 1994–2004: Sturm Graz

Senior career*
Years	Team	Apps	(Gls)
2004–2009	Sturm Graz	15	(0)
2008–2009	→ DSV Leoben (loan)	26	(1)
2009–2011	SC Rheindorf Altach	53	(2)
2011–2014	Wolfsberger AC	49	(0)
2014–2015	Kapfenberger SV	26	(0)
2015–	ASK Voitsberg	113	(7)
- * Club domestic league appearances and goals as of 09:48, 27 October 2020 (UTC)

Gernot Suppan (born 18 November 1985) is an Austrian footballer who plays for ASK Voitsberg.
