= Dario Baldauf =

Austrian football player

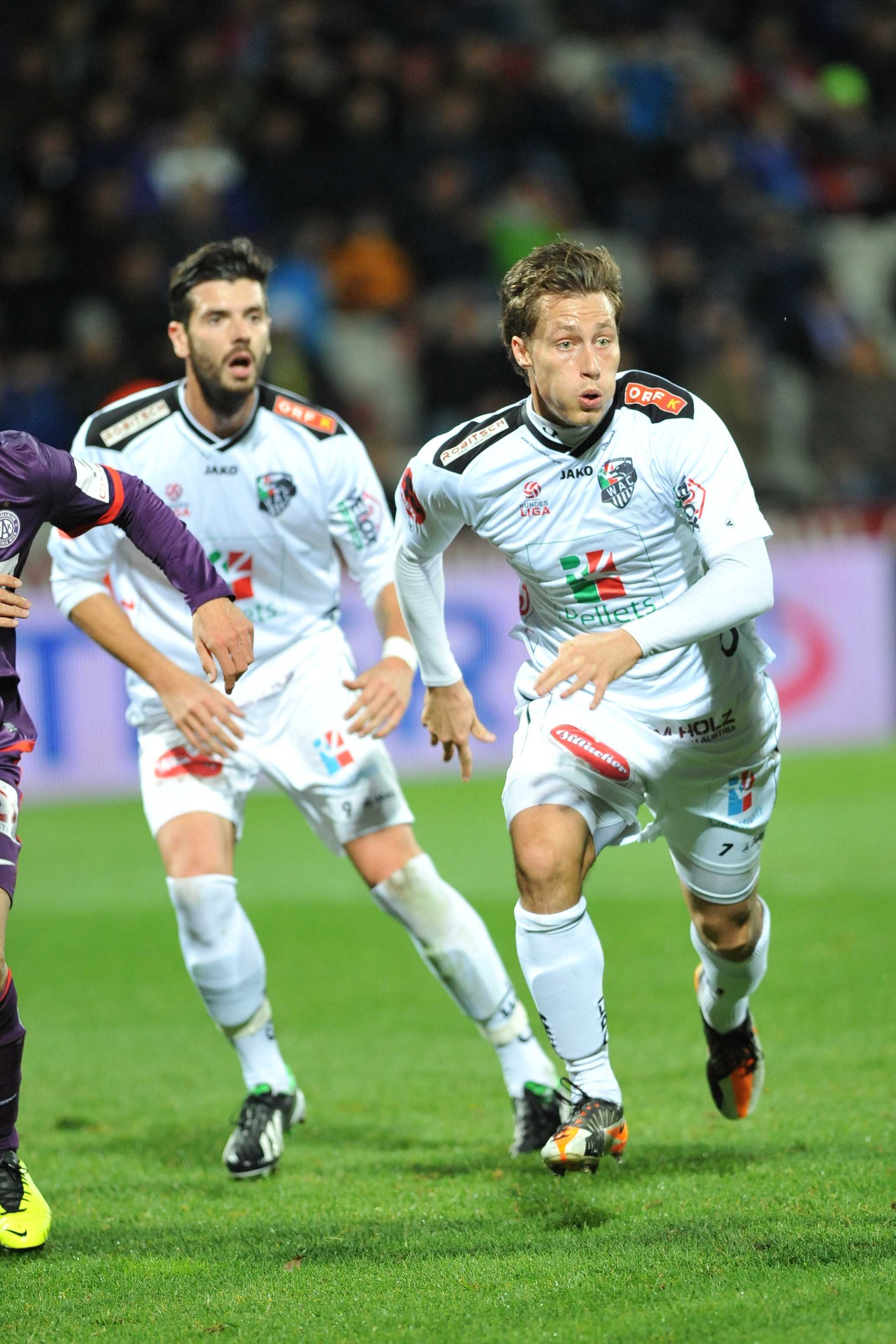

Personal information
- Full name: Dario Baldauf
- Date of birth: March 27, 1985 (age 41)
- Place of birth: Bregenz, Austria
- Height: 1.80 m (5 ft 11 in)
- Position: Left back

Youth career
- BNZ Vorarlberg

Senior career*
Years	Team	Apps	(Gls)
2002–2003	FC Hard	22	(0)
2003–2004	Austria Lustenau	28	(0)
2004	VfB Admira Mödling	16	(1)
2005	SW Bregenz	13	(0)
2005–2008	SC Rheindorf Altach	47	(2)
2008–2010	FC Lustenau 07	44	(5)
2010–2017	Wolfsberger AC	174	(11)
- * Club domestic league appearances and goals as of 20:33, 18 October 2016 (UTC)

Dario Baldauf (born 27 March 1985, in Bregenz) is an Austrian football player, who last played for Wolfsberger AC.

== Club career ==
Baldauf came through at the Bundesliga Nachwuchs Zentrum Vorarlberg and made his professional debut in the 2003/2004 season with Second Division side Austria Lustenau. After spending half the 2004/2005 season at VfB Admira Mödling and the other half at SW Bregenz, Baldauf moved to SCR Altach in 2005. He was released by SC Rheindorf Altach in the Austrian Football Bundesliga in summer 2008 and signed than for FC Lustenau 07.

He predominantly plays as a right wingback, but is equally adept in the left wingback role.
