= Nenad Jovanović (footballer, born 1979) =

Serbian-Austrian footballer

Personal information
- Full name: Nenad Jovanović
- Date of birth: 9 November 1979 (age 47)
- Place of birth: Belgrade, SFR Yugoslavia
- Position: Defender

Senior career*
Years	Team	Apps	(Gls)
2000–2008	DSV Leoben	219	(20)
2008–2010	Red Bull Salzburg Juniors	54	(3)
2010–2014	Wolfsberger AC	92	(2)
2014–2019	ASKÖ Oedt		
- * Club domestic league appearances and goals

Nenad Jovanović (born 9 November 1979) is a retired Serbian-Austrian footballer.
