= Vöcklabrucker SC =

- Full name: Vöcklabrucker Sport Club
- Founded: 2009; 17 years ago
- Ground: Voralpenstadion
- Capacity: 5,000
- Chairman: Winfried Schwaighofer
- Manager: (Austria) Markus Sturm
- League: 2. Klasse Mitte West
Home colours	Away colours

Vöcklabrucker SC is an Austrian association football club from Vöcklabruck, who currently plays in the 8th tier Upper Austria 2. Klasse Mitte West.

== History ==
After the dissolution of the 1. FC Vöcklabruck and the relegation from the First Division to the regional league. The city has on Hausruck founded a new club, the Vöcklabrucker SC start in the 2nd Klasse Mitte/West. Class mid-west.

== Current squad ==
Note: Flags indicate national team as defined under FIFA eligibility rules; some limited exceptions apply. Players may hold more than one non-FIFA nationality.

No.	Pos.	Nation	Player
1	GK	CRO	Robert Bikic
2	DF	AUT	Daniel Konrad
3	DF	AUT	Harald Johannes Adam
4	MF	BIH	Senudin Bajrektarevic
5	MF	AUT	Hannes Grohs
6	DF	ALB	Kushtrim Hasani
7	MF	AUT	Raphael Ecker
8	MF	AUT	Christian Binder
9	FW	AUT	Christoph Hochauer
10	MF	TUR	Görkem Safranti

No.	Pos.	Nation	Player
11	FW	AUT	Gabriel Spiessberger
13	DF	BIH	Anto Tecic
14	DF	BIH	Boris Vidovic
15	MF	BIH	Robert Ljubic
16	MF	AUT	Joachim Hackl
18	FW	BIH	Seid Mehmedagic
19	MF	AUT	Daniel Streicher
21	MF	BIH	Senad Hadzic
22	GK	IND	Ramneet Marok
30	MF	AUT	Patrick Mayer
