= Danijel Mićić =

Austrian footballer

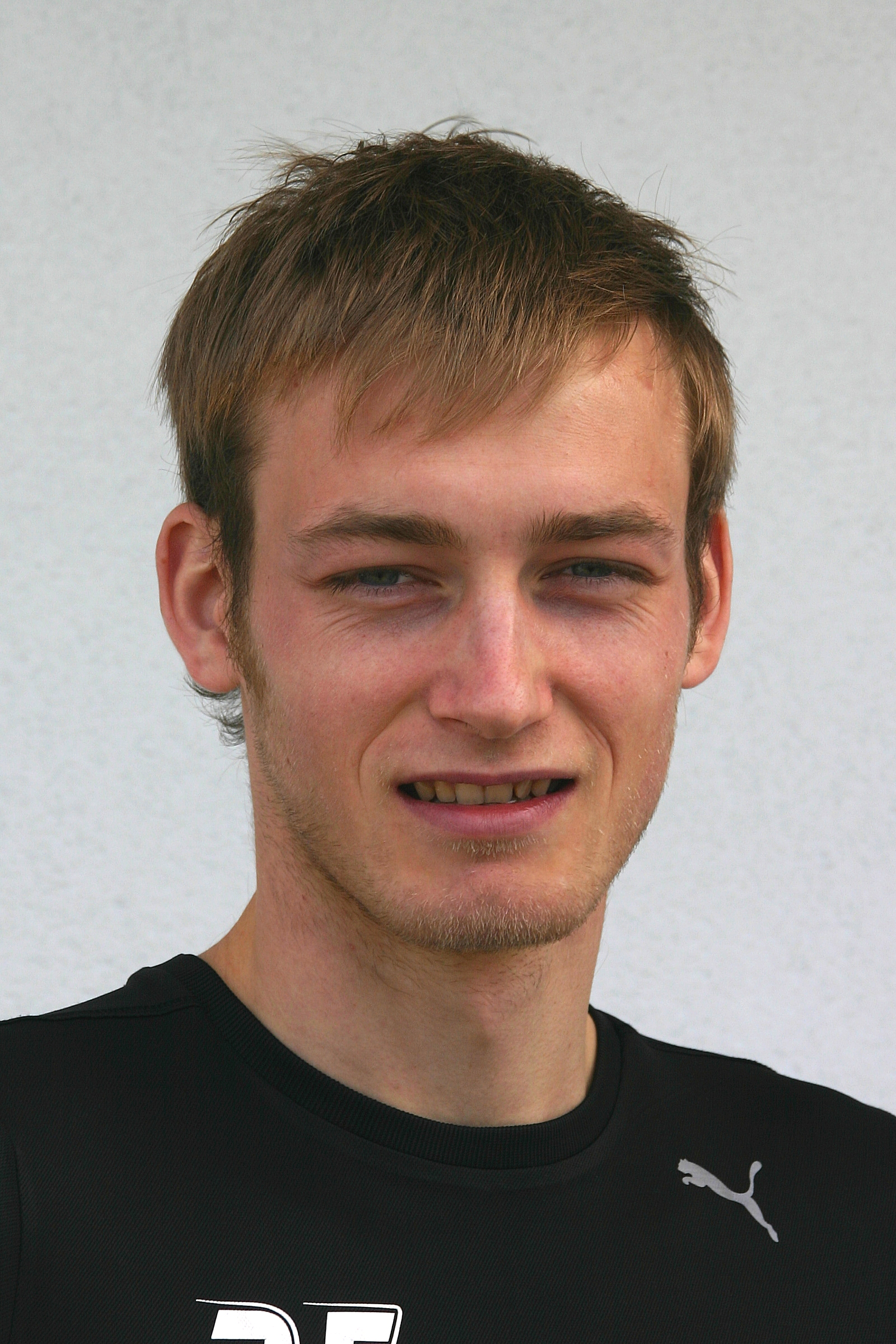

Personal information
- Date of birth: 18 October 1988 (age 38)
- Place of birth: Brčko, SFR Yugoslavia
- Height: 1.85 m (6 ft 1 in)
- Position: Midfielder

Team information
- Current team: Wacker Innsbruck
- Number: 19

Senior career*
Years	Team	Apps	(Gls)
2006–2009	FC Kärnten	21	(0)
2009–2011	SC Austria Lustenau	67	(7)
2011–2013	Kapfenberger SV	40	(9)
2012	→ WAC/St. Andrä (loan)	14	(0)
2013–2014	Wolfsberger AC	7	(1)
2014–	Wacker Innsbruck	43	(6)
- * Club domestic league appearances and goals as of 27 June 2016

Danijel Mićić (born 18 October 1988) is an Austrian footballer who plays for Wacker Innsbruck in the Austrian Bundesliga.
