= Christian Dobnik =

Austrian footballer

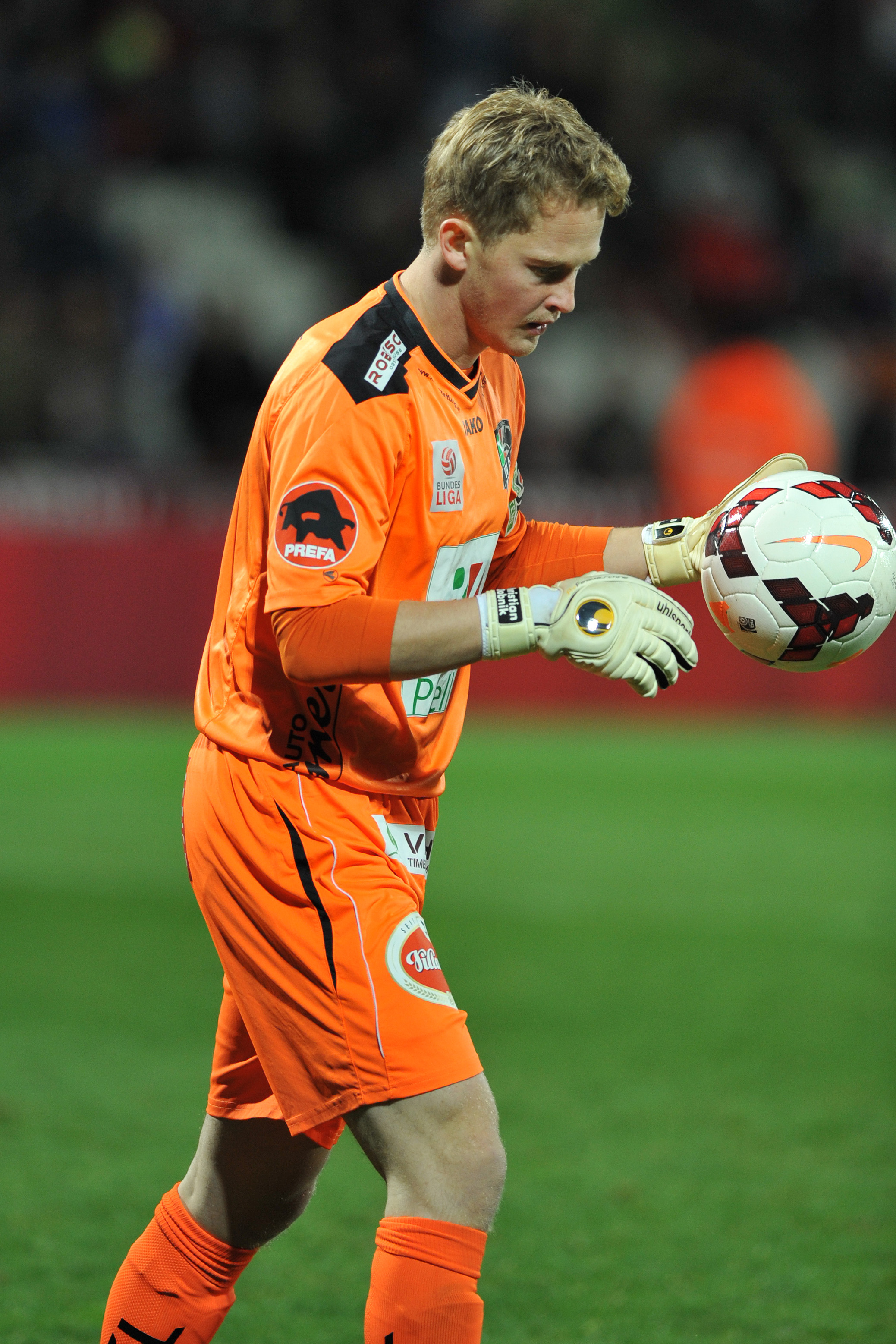

Personal information
- Date of birth: 10 July 1986 (age 40)
- Place of birth: Klagenfurt, Austria
- Height: 1.81 m (5 ft 11 1/2 in)
- Position: Goalkeeper

Team information
- Current team: AEK Athens (Goalkeeping coach)

Senior career*
Years	Team	Apps	(Gls)
2007–2008	FC Kärnten	21	(0)
2008–2010	FC Lustenau 07	57	(0)
2010–2019	Wolfsberger AC	175	(0)
2016–2022	Wolfsberger AC II	3	(0)
- * Club domestic league appearances and goals as of 26 October 2020

Christian Dobnik (born 10 July 1986) is a former Austrian footballer who played as a Goalkeeper. He is currently the goalkeeping coach for AEK Athens.
