= SV Bad Aussee =

- Full name: Sportverein Bad Aussee
- Founded: 1932
- Dissolved: 2011
- Ground: Panoramastadion
- Capacity: 3,000
- Chairman: Dieter Hundt
- Manager: Ivo Gölz
- League: Austrian Regional League Central
Home colours	Away colours

SV Bad Aussee was an Austrian association football club, from Bad Aussee. The club was dissolved in 2011.

== History ==
SV Bad Aussee was founded in 1932 with the club colours blue and white. In 2000, the club was promoted to the fourth-tier Landesliga. Through the contacts of President Dieter Hundt with Provincial Councillor Gerhard Hirschmann, SV Bad Ausse received millions of euros in subsidies from the state, which made it possible to build the Panorama Stadium in 2003.

== Staff and board members ==
- Manager: (Austria) Ivo Gölz
- Assistant Manager: (Austria) Thomas Heissl
