= 2016–17 SK Rapid Wien season =

Rapid Wien
2016–17 season
- President: Michael Krammer
- Head Coach: Goran Djuricin; Damir Canadi (until 8 April 2017); Mike Büskens (until 7 November 2016)
- Stadium: Allianz Stadion, Vienna, Austria
- Bundesliga: 5th
- Austrian Cup: Runner-up
- Europa League: Group stage (3rd)
- Top goalscorer: League: Joelinton (8); All: Joelinton (13)
- Highest home attendance: 26,300 vs. Austria Wien, 23 October 2016
- Lowest home attendance: 14,200 vs. SKN St. Pölten, 3 December 2016
- Average home league attendance: 21,100
Home colours	Away colours	Third colours

The 2016–17 SK Rapid Wien season was the 119th season in club history.

== Background ==
=== Background information ===
Rapid Wien finished the 2015–16 season in second place. Therefore, Rapid Wien started in the 3rd qualifying round of the 2016/17 Europa League competition.

This was the first season Rapid played in the Allianz Stadion.

On 7 November 2016, after a 0–1 defeat at home against Wolfsberger AC both manager Mike Büskens and Director of Football Andreas Müller were sacked. Four days later Damir Canadi was presented as the new manager, joining Rapid from league rival SCR Altach. On 11 December, Fredy Bickel was presented as the new Director of Football.

On 9 April 2017, after a 0–3 defeat in Ried manager Damir Canadi was sacked and replaced by his former assistant coaches Goran Djuricin and Martin Bernhard until end of season. Djuricin was later appointed as manager for the following season.

== Pre-season and friendlies ==
Date	Opponents	Venue	Result F–A	Goalscorers		Attendance
Date	Opponents	Venue	Result F–A	Rapid Wien	Opponent	Attendance
26 June 2016	Szombathelyi Haladás	N	1–0	Murg 71'		1,300
1 July 2016	Rubin Kazan	N	1–0	Joelinton 52'		2,000
16 July 2016	Chelsea	H	2–0	Joelinton 8', Tomi 82'		28,600
21 January 2017	SC Wiener Neustadt	H	1–2	Schaub 36'	Freiberger 41', Stefel 44'	400
25 January 2017	Ferencvárosi TC	N	1–0	Szántó 72' (pen.)		
28 January 2017	Piast Gliwice	N	2–1	Malicsek 64', Sobczyk 87'	Jankowski 15'	
26 March 2017	First Vienna	A	4–0	Szántó 9', 76', Pavelić 44', Keles 45'		6,200

== Bundesliga ==
=== Bundesliga fixtures and results ===
Win Draw Loss

MD	Date – KO	Opponent	Venue	Result F–A	Attendance	Goalscorers and disciplined players		Table			Ref.
MD	Date – KO	Opponent	Venue	Result F–A	Attendance	Rapid Wien	Opponent	Pos.	Pts.	GD	Ref.
1	23 July 2016 16:00	Ried	H	5–0	23,600	Schößwendter 13'; Schaub 29'; Murg 42' 55'; Joelinton 56'	Egho (yellow card) 45' (red card)	1st	3	+5	
2	31 July 2016 16:30	Rheindorf Altach	A	0–1	6,237		Salomon 75'	3rd	3	+4	
3	7 August 2016 16:30	Austria Wien	A	4–1	15,200	Traustason 33'; Schaub 65'; Grahovac 87'; Joelinton 90+3'	Kayode 63'	2nd	6	+7	
4	13 August 2016 18:30	Admira Wacker Mödling	H	4–0	21,800	Schaub 17' 65'; Schwab 25' 78'	Toth (red card) 59'	2nd	9	+11	
5	21 August 2016 16:30	Wolfsberger AC	A	1–1	5,900	Schößwendter 31'	Prosenik 82'	3rd	10	+11	
6	28 August 2016 16:30	Red Bull Salzburg	H	0–0	25,300			3rd	11	+11	
7	10 September 2016 16:00	Sturm Graz	A	1–1	16,600	Szántó 54'	Schulz 22'	5th	12	+11	
8	18 September 2016 19:00	Mattersburg	H	3–0	19,600	Schaub 62'; Szántó 65'; Pavelić 83'		3rd	15	+14	
9	24 September 2016 16:00	St. Pölten	A	1–1	8,000	Joelinton 45+3' (pen.)	Petrovic 59'	3rd	16	+14	
10	2 October 2016 16:30	Ried	A	2–4	5,200	Schwab 26' 90'	Honsak 6'; Žulj 23'; Reifeltshammer 40'; Nutz 65'	4th	16	+12	
11	15 October 2016 18:30	Rheindorf Altach	H	1–1	22,000	Grahovac (red card) 74'; Schößwendter 89'	Ngamaleu 29'	5th	17	+12	
12	23 October 2016 16:30	Austria Wien	H	0–2	26,300		Holzhauser 37' (pen.); Grünwald 48'	5th	17	+10	
13	29 October 2016 16:00	Admira Wacker Mödling	A	2–1	5,000	Szántó 16'; Murg 29'; Močinić (yellow card) 76' (red card)	Knasmüllner 49'	5th	20	+11	
14	6 November 2016 14:00	Wolfsberger AC	H	0–1	17,200		Prosenik 75'	5th	20	+10	
15	20 November 2016 16:30	Red Bull Salzburg	A	1–2	15,000	Tomi 90+2' (pen.); Sonnleitner (red card) 90+4'	Dabour 8'; Lainer 45+1'; Miranda (yellow card) 90+3' (red card)	5th	20	+9	
16	27 November 2016 16:30	Sturm Graz	H	1–2	26,200	Kvilitaia 13'	Lykogiannis 10'; Schmerböck 81'	5th	20	+8	
17	30 November 2016 20:30	Mattersburg	A	1–1	3,000	Malicsek 76'; Schrammel (yellow card) 87' (red card)	Jano 72'	7th	21	+8	
18	3 December 2016 16:00	St. Pölten	H	1–0	14,200	Traustason 79'		5th	24	+9	
19	11 December 2016 14:00	Ried	H	3–1	15,700	Sonnleitner 26'; Kvilitaia 77' 81' (pen.)	Elsneg 4'; Žulj (yellow card) 66' (red card)	5th	27	+11	
20	18 December 2016 16:30	Rheindorf Altach	A	1–3	7,200	Grahovac 59'	Netzer 7' 60'; Dovedan 55'	5th	27	+9	
21	12 February 2017 16:30	Austria Wien	A	1–1	15,577	Kvilitaia 55'; Joelinton (yellow card) 66' (red card)	Rotpuller 90+4'	5th	28	+9	
22	18 February 2017 18:30	Admira Wacker Mödling	H	0–0	17,300			5th	29	+9	
23	25 February 2017 16:00	Wolfsberger AC	A	1–2	4,350	Sonnleitner 61'	Tschernegg 36'; Leitgeb 80'	5th	29	+8	
24	5 March 2017 16:30	Red Bull Salzburg	H	0–1	23,200		Berisha 71'	5th	29	+7	
25	12 March 2017 16:30	Sturm Graz	A	1–2	15,329	Joelinton 80'	Alar 21' (pen.); Lykogiannis 64'	6th	29	+6	
26	18 March 2017 16:00	Mattersburg	H	1–1	19,600	Kvilitaia 45+2'	Atanga 1'	7th	30	+6	
27	1 April 2017 16:00	St. Pölten	A	1–1	7,627	Joelinton 22'	Huber 45'	7th	31	+6	
28	8 April 2017 16:00	Ried	A	0–3	6,200		Elsneg 46'; Žulj 52'; Hart 56'	7th	31	+3	
29	15 April 2017 18:30	Rheindorf Altach	H	3–0	20,200	Hofmann S. 9' 29' (pen.); Malicsek 90+2'		6th	34	+6	
30	23 April 2017 16:30	Admira Wacker Mödling	H	0–2	26,100		Venuto 22'; Pires 56'	6th	34	+4	
31	30 April 2017 16:30	Admira Wacker Mödling	A	2–3	5,300	Szántó 34'; Joelinton 41'	Sax 4'; Knasmüllner 67' (pen.); Monschein 90'	7th	34	+3	
32	6 May 2017 18:30	Wolfsberger AC	H	4–0	18,600	Kvilitaia 8' 11'; Joelinton 63'; Schwab 90'		6th	37	+7	
33	13 May 2017 16:00	Red Bull Salzburg	A	0–1	15,900		Lazaro 73'	6th	37	+6	
34	21 May 2017 16:30	Sturm Graz	H	1–0	23,300	Szántó 17'		6th	40	+7	
35	25 May 2017 16:30	Mattersburg	A	3–1	9,000	Joelinton 38'; Traustason 84'; Malić 87' (o.g.)	Höller 41'	6th	43	+9	
36	28 May 2017 16:30	St. Pölten	H	2–1	20,200	Dibon 9'; Schößwendter 54'	Doumbouya 22' (pen.)	5th	46	+10	

=== League table ===
Pos	Team	Pld	W	D	L	GF	GA	GD	Pts	Qualification or relegation
3	Sturm Graz	36	19	3	14	55	39	+16	60	Qualification for the Europa League second qualifying round
4	Rheindorf Altach	36	15	8	13	46	49	−3	53	Qualification for the Europa League first qualifying round
5	Rapid Wien	36	12	10	14	52	42	+10	46	
6	Admira Wacker Mödling	36	13	7	16	36	55	−19	46	
7	Mattersburg	36	12	7	17	39	54	−15	43	

Source: weltfussball.de (in German), Soccerway
Rules for classification: 1) Points; 2) Goal difference; 3) Goals scored; 4) Matches won; 5) Away matches won; 6) Head-to-head points; 7) Head-to-head goal difference; 8) Head-to-head goals scored.

=== Results summary ===
Overall								Home						Away					
Pld	W	D	L	GF	GA	GD	Pts	W	D	L	GF	GA	GD	W	D	L	GF	GA	GD
36	12	10	14	51	41	+10	46	9	4	5	29	12	+17	3	6	9	22	29	−7

== Austrian Cup ==
=== Austrian Cup review ===
In a curious turn of events, Rapid played all of its first three games in the Austrian Cup in the Sportklub Stadium in Vienna as neither the home grounds of the opponents had the infrastructure to host the game and the venue of the Linzer Stadion, where Blau-Weiß Linz initially wanted to move, was already occupied at the time with hosting the 2016 World Karate Championships.

=== Austrian Cup fixtures and results ===
Win Loss Postponed

Round	Date	Opponent	Venue	Result F–A	Attendance	Goalscorers and disciplined players		Ref.
Round	Date	Opponent	Venue	Result F–A	Attendance	Rapid Wien	Opponent	Ref.
1st	8 July 2016 19:30	FC Karabakh Wien	A	3–1	4,000	Joelinton 22'; Hofmann S. 52'; Schwab 67'	Kara 90'	
2nd	21 September 2016 18:00	SV Leobendorf	A	1–0	3,200	Schößwendter 50'		
R16	26 October 2016 20:15	Blau-Weiß Linz	A	4–0	3,974	Schaub 7'; Murg 22'; Kvilitaia 33'; Jelić 58'		
QF	5 April 2017 20:30	SKN St. Pölten	A	3–1	6,700	Wöber 17'; Pavelić 73'; Schwab 83'	Wöber 90+6' (o.g.)	
SF	26 April 2017 20:30	LASK	H	2–1	18,200	Murg 76'; Joelinton 90+3'	Gartler 90+1'	
F	1 June 2017 20:30	RB Salzburg	N	1–2	20,300	Joelinton 56'	Hwang 51'; Lazaro 84'	

== Europa League ==
=== Europa League review ===
Rapid entered the Europa League in the 3rd qualifying round and qualified for the group stage after knocking out Torpedo Zhodino and AS Trenčín. Rapid was drawn into group F to compete against Athletic Bilbao, K.R.C. Genk and US Sassuolo Calcio and did not qualify for the knockout stage.

=== Qualifying rounds ===
Leg	Date	Opponent	Venue	Result F–A	Agg. score F–A	Attendance	Goalscorers and disciplined players		Ref.
Leg	Date	Opponent	Venue	Result F–A	Agg. score F–A	Attendance	Rapid Wien	Opponent	Ref.
Third qualifying round
FL	28 July 2016 19:00	Torpedo Zhodino (Belarus)	A	0–0	-	4,000			
SL	4 August 2016 21:05	Torpedo Zhodino (Belarus)	H	3–0	3–0	18,600	Pavelić 26'; Schrammel 36'; Schaub 90+2'		
Play-off round
FL	18 August 2016 21:05	AS Trenčín (Slovakia)	A	4–0	-	4,065	Schaub 32' 54' 83'; Schwab 73'		
SL	25 August 2016 21:05	AS Trenčín (Slovakia)	H	0–2	4–2	21,200		Lawrence 12'; Paur 35'; Jančo (yellow card) 53' (red card)	

=== Group stage ===
==== Table ====
Pos	Team	Pld	W	D	L	GF	GA	GD	Pts	Qualification
1	(Belgium) Genk	6	4	0	2	13	9	+4	12	Advance to knockout phase
2	(Spain) Athletic Bilbao	6	3	1	2	10	11	−1	10	Advance to knockout phase
3	(Austria) Rapid Wien	6	1	3	2	7	8	−1	6	
4	(Italy) Sassuolo	6	1	2	3	9	11	−2	5	

Source: UEFA
Rules for classification: Group stage tiebreakers

==== Fixtures and results ====
MD	Date	Opponent	Venue	Result F–A	Attendance	Goalscorers and disciplined players		Table		Ref.
MD	Date	Opponent	Venue	Result F–A	Attendance	Rapid Wien	Opponent	Pos.	Pts.	Ref.
1	15 September 2016 19:00	Genk (Belgium)	H	3–2	21,800	Schwab 51'; Joelinton 59'; Colley 60' (o.g.)	Bailey 29' 90' (pen.)	2nd	3	
2	29 September 2016 21:05	Athletic Bilbao (Spain)	A	0–1	35,000		Beñat 59'	3rd	3	
3	20 October 2016 21:05	Sassuolo (Italy)	H	1–1	22,200	Schaub 7'	Schrammel 66' (o.g.)	3rd	4	
4	3 November 2016 19:00	Sassuolo (Italy)	A	2–2	7,838	Jelić 85'; Kvilitaia 90'	Defrel 34'; Pellegrini 45+3'	3rd	5	
5	24 November 2016 21:05	Genk (Belgium)	A	0–1	10,000		Karelis 11'	3rd	5	
6	8 December 19:00	Athletic Bilbao (Spain)	H	1–1	21,500	Joelinton 72'	Saborit 84'	3rd	6	

== Team record ==
Competition	First match	Last match	Record							
Competition	First match	Last match	M	W	D	L	GF	GA	GD	Win %
Bundesliga	23 July	28 May	36	12	10	14	52	42	+10	33.33
ÖFB Cup	8 July	1 June	6	5	0	1	14	5	+9	83.33
Europa League	28 July	8 December	10	3	4	3	14	10	+4	30.00
Total			52	20	14	18	80	57	+23	38.46

== Squad ==
=== Squad statistics ===
No.	Nat.	Name	Age	League		Austrian Cup		Europa League		Total		Discipline		
No.	Nat.	Name	Age	Apps	Goals	Apps	Goals	Apps	Goals	Apps	Goals	Yellow card	(yellow card) (red card)	Red card
Goalkeepers
1	(Slovakia)	Ján Novota	32	4		2		5		11				
21	(Austria)	Tobias Knoflach	22	15		2		1		18				
30	(Austria)	Richard Strebinger	23	17		2		4		23				
Defenders
3	(Austria)	Christoph Schößwendter	27	20+2	4	2+1	1	7		29+3	5	2		
4	(Austria)	Thomas Schrammel	28	22+4		5		9+1	1	36+5	1	5	1	
6	(Austria)	Mario Sonnleitner	29	17+3	2	1		3		21+3	2	5		1
17	(Austria)	Christopher Dibon	25	26	1	4		9		39	1	4		
20	(Austria)	Maximilian Hofmann	22	16+3		3		3+1		22+4		4		
22	(Austria)	Mario Pavelić	22	28	1	5	1	7	1	40	3	3		
24	(Austria)	Stephan Auer	25	15+3		3+2		2+1		20+6		2		
25	(Austria)	Andreas Dober	30	1						1		1		
38	(Austria)	Manuel Thurnwald	17	9+2				2		11+2				
39	(Austria)	Maximilian Wöber	18	9+2		3+1	1	2		14+3	1	3		
Midfielders
7	(Austria)	Philipp Schobesberger	22	4+1		1		2+2		7+3				
8	(Austria)	Stefan Schwab	25	27	5	4+1	2	6+1	2	37+2	9	7		
10	(Austria)	Louis Schaub	21	26+2	5	3	1	9+1	5	38+3	11	4		
11	(Germany)	Steffen Hofmann	35	7+8	2	3+1	1	0+3		10+12	3	2		
16	(Austria)	Philipp Malicsek	19	2+7	2	0+2		1		3+9	2			
18	(Hungary)	Tamás Szántó	20	18+11	5	5		1+3		24+14	5			
23	(Iceland)	Arnór Ingvi Traustason	23	14+8	3	1+2		7+1		22+11	3	1		
26	(Croatia)	Ivan Močinić	23	11+3		2		7+1		20+4		7	1	
27	(Austria)	Andreas Kuen	21	8		1+1				9+1		2		
29	(Austria)	Thomas Murg	21	19+7	3	5+1	2	5+2		29+10	5	3		
36	(Austria)	Kelvin Arase	17	0+2		0+1				0+3				
41	(Austria)	Osarenren Okungbowa	22	1+1						1+1				
Forwards
9	(Croatia)	Matej Jelić	25	5+5		1+2	1	1+3	1	7+10	2	3		
13	(Georgia (country))	Giorgi Kvilitaia	22	17+9	7	3+1	1	0+5	1	20+15	9	8		
28	(Spain)	Tomi Correa	31	0+2	1			1		1+2	1	1		
34	(Brazil)	Joelinton	19	26+7	8	3+2	3	9+1	2	38+10	13	9	1	
43	(Austria)	Alex Sobczyk	19	0+1						0+1				
Players who left after the start of the season
15	(Bosnia and Herzegovina)	Srđan Grahovac	23	12+8	2	2		7+2		21+10	2	6		1
31 / 99	(Austria)	Maximilian Entrup	18	0+2				0+1		0+3				

=== Goal scorers ===
Name	Bundesliga	Cup	Europa League	Total
(Brazil) Joelinton	8	3	2	13
(Austria) Louis Schaub	5	1	5	11
(Georgia (country)) Giorgi Kvilitaia	7	1	1	9
(Austria) Stefan Schwab	5	2	2	9
(Austria) Thomas Murg	3	2		5
(Austria) Christoph Schößwendter	4	1		5
(Hungary) Tamás Szántó	5			5
(Germany) Steffen Hofmann	2	1		3
(Austria) Mario Pavelić	1	1	1	3
(Iceland) Arnór Ingvi Traustason	3			3
(Bosnia and Herzegovina) Srđan Grahovac	2			2
(Croatia) Matej Jelić		1	1	2
(Austria) Philipp Malicsek	2			2
(Austria) Mario Sonnleitner	2			2
(Spain) Tomi Correa	1			1
(Austria) Christopher Dibon	1			1
(Austria) Thomas Schrammel			1	1
(Austria) Maximilian Wöber		1		1
Own goals
(The Gambia) Omar Colley (Genk)			1	1
(Austria) Nedeljko Malić (Mattersburg)	1			1
Totals	52	14	14	80

=== Disciplinary record ===
Name	Bundesliga			Cup			Europa League			Total		
Name	Yellow card	(yellow card) (red card)	Red card	Yellow card	(yellow card) (red card)	Red card	Yellow card	(yellow card) (red card)	Red card	Yellow card	(yellow card) (red card)	Red card
(Brazil) Joelinton	7	1					2			9	1	
(Croatia) Ivan Močinić	5	1					2			7	1	
(Georgia (country)) Giorgi Kvilitaia	4			2			2			8		
(Bosnia and Herzegovina) Srđan Grahovac	4		1				2			6		1
(Austria) Stefan Schwab	5			1			1			7		
(Austria) Mario Sonnleitner	4		1				1			5		1
(Austria) Thomas Schrammel	4	1					1			5	1	
(Austria) Christopher Dibon	1			1			2			4		
(Austria) Maximilian Hofmann	4									4		
(Austria) Louis Schaub	2						2			4		
(Austria) Christopher Dibon	1			1			2			4		
(Croatia) Matej Jelić	2						1			3		
(Austria) Thomas Murg	1			1			1			3		
(Austria) Mario Pavelić	2			1						3		
(Austria) Maximilian Wöber	1						2			3		
(Austria) Stephan Auer	1						1			2		
(Germany) Steffen Hofmann	1						1			2		
(Austria) Andreas Kuen	1			1						2		
(Austria) Christoph Schößwendter	2									2		
(Spain) Tomi Correa	1									1		
(Austria) Andreas Dober	1									1		
(Iceland) Arnór Ingvi Traustason	1									1		
Totals	54	3	2	7			21			82	3	2

=== Transfers ===
==== In ====
No.	Pos.	Name	Age	Moved from	Type	Transfer Window	Contract ends	Transfer fee	Ref.
3	DF	(Austria) Christoph Schößwendter	27	(Austria) Admira Wacker Mödling	End of contract	Summer	2019	Free	
23	MF	(Iceland) Arnór Ingvi Traustason	23	(Sweden) IFK Norrköping	Transfer	Summer	2020	€1,900,000	
16	MF	(Austria) Philipp Malicsek	19	(Austria) Admira Wacker Mödling	Transfer	Summer	2019	Undisclosed	
34	FW	(Brazil) Joelinton	19	(Germany) TSG 1899 Hoffenheim	Loan	Summer	2018	€600,000	
99	FW	(Austria) Maximilian Entrup	18	(Austria) Floridsdorfer AC	Transfer	Summer	2019	Undisclosed	
26	MF	(Croatia) Ivan Močinić	23	(Croatia) HNK Rijeka	Transfer	Summer	2020	€2,000,000	
13	FW	(Georgia (country)) Giorgi Kvilitaia	22	(Georgia (country)) Dinamo Tbilisi	Transfer	Summer	2020	€700,000	
27	MF	(Austria) Andreas Kuen	21	(Austria) Floridsdorfer AC	Loan return	Winter	2018		

==== Out ====
No.	Pos.	Name	Age	Moved to	Type	Transfer Window	Transfer fee	Ref.
5	MF	(Greece) Thanos Petsos	25	(Germany) Werder Bremen	End of Contract	Summer	Free	
33	FW	(Austria) Deni Alar	26	(Austria) Sturm Graz	End of Contract	Summer	Free	
36	DF	(Austria) Michael Schimpelsberger	25	(Austria) Wacker Innsbruck	End of Contract	Summer	Free	
14	MF	(Austria) Florian Kainz	23	(Germany) Werder Bremen	Transfer	Summer	€3,500,000	
23	DF	(Austria) Stefan Stangl	24	(Austria) Red Bull Salzburg	Transfer	Summer	€1,600,000	
38	FW	(Austria) Philipp Prosenik	23	(Austria) Wolfsberger AC	Loan	Summer		
27	MF	(Austria) Andreas Kuen	21	(Austria) Floridsdorfer AC	Loan	Summer		
19	MF	(Austria) Stefan Nutz	24	(Austria) SV Ried	Transfer	Summer	Free	
31	FW	(Austria) Maximilian Entrup	19	(Austria) SKN St. Pölten	Loan	Winter		
15	MF	(Bosnia and Herzegovina) Srđan Grahovac	24	(Kazakhstan) FC Astana	Loan	Winter		
