= 2015–16 SK Rapid Wien season =

Rapid Wien
2015–16 season
- President: Michael Krammer
- Head Coach: Zoran Barisic
- Stadium: Ernst Happel Stadium, Vienna, Austria
- Bundesliga: 2nd
- Austrian Cup: Quarter-final
- UEFA Champions League: Play-off round
- UEFA Europa League: Round of 32
- Top goalscorer: League: Stefan Schwab (8); All: Florian Kainz (11); Philipp Schobesberger (11)
- Highest home attendance: 46,000 vs. Shakhtar Donetsk, 19 August 2015
- Lowest home attendance: 5,500 vs. Admira Wacker, 10 February 2016
- Average home league attendance: 17,200
Home colours	Away colours

The 2015–16 SK Rapid Wien season was the 118th season in club history.

== Background ==
=== Background information ===
Rapid Wien finished the 2014–15 season in second place. Therefore, Rapid Wien started in the 3rd qualifying round of the 2015/16 Champions League competition.

== Pre-season and friendlies ==
Date	Opponent	Venue	Result F–A	Goalscorers		Attendance	Ref.
Date	Opponent	Venue	Result F–A	Rapid Wien	Opponent	Attendance	Ref.
3 July 2015	SKN St. Pölten	A	4–1	Schwab 15', Huspek 17', Tomi 79', Nutz 90'	Segovia 19'	6,184	
8 July 2015	FK Jablonec	N	0–0			1,500	
11 July 2015	FSV Frankfurt	N	2–0	Kainz 32', Nutz 53'		2,000	
15 January 2016	Floridsdorfer AC	H	1–3	Prosenik 35'	Viertl 52', Entrup 54', 66'	300	
24 January 2016	FC St. Pauli	N	1–1	Schwab 60'	Sobota 72'	100	
30 January 2016	Bohemians Praha	N	2–2	Jelic 7', Schwab 30' (pen.)	Mikus 45', Bartek 78'	100	

== Bundesliga ==
=== Bundesliga fixtures and results ===
Win Draw Loss

MD	Date – KO	Opponent	Venue	Result F–A	Attendance	Goalscorers and disciplined players		Table			Ref.
MD	Date – KO	Opponent	Venue	Result F–A	Attendance	Rapid Wien	Opponent	Pos.	Pts.	GD	Ref.
1	25 July 2015 18:30	Ried	H	3–0	15,100	Kainz 48'; Beric 85'; Schaub 89'	Kragl (red card) 27'	1st	3	+3	
2	1 August 2015 18:30	Red Bull Salzburg	A	2–1	17,357	Petsos 15'; Schwab 33'	Oberlin 66'	1st	6	+4	
3	9 August 2015 19:00	Wolfsberger AC	H	2–1	13,300	Kainz 66' 81'	Wernitznig 21'	1st	9	+5	
4	12 August 2015 20:30	Austria Wien	A	5–2	12,500	Stangl 17'; Schobesberger 27'; Schwab 33'; Hofmann S. 56'; Beric 66'	Gorgon 45+2', 72'	1st	12	+8	
5	16 August 2015 16:30	Sturm Graz	A	2–2	14,876	Beric 70'; Madl 88' (o.g.)	Hadzic 34' (pen.); Avdijaj 45+3'	1st	13	+8	
6	22 August 2015 16:00	Grödig	H	3–0	16,800	Sonnleitner 67'; Alar 74'; Schobesberger 90+2'	Pichler (yellow card) 90+1' (red card)	1st	16	+11	
7	29 August 2015 18:30	Mattersburg	H	2–4	14,300	Strebinger (red card) 5'; Alar 50'; Hofmann S. 81'	Perlak 39'; Röcher 60'; Pink 62'; Mahrer 78'	1st	16	+9	
8	12 September 2015 16:00	Rheindorf Altach	A	0–2	7,250		Harrer 54' 88'	2nd	16	+7	
9	20 September 2015 16:30	Admira Wacker Mödling	H	2–0	15,500	Schwab 42'; Dibon 66'		1st	19	+9	
10	26 September 2015 16:00	Ried	A	1–0	6,000	Jelic 90+3'		1st	22	+10	
11	4 October 2015 16:30	Red Bull Salzburg	H	1–2	23,200	Stangl 18'	Minamino 43'; Schwegler 64'	1st	22	+9	
12	18 October 2015 16:30	Wolfsberger AC	A	1–2	4,600	Schaub 90+3'	Jacobo 42'; Ouedraogo 57'	3rd	22	+8	
13	25 October 2015 16:30	Austria Wien	H	1–2	32,200	Prosenik 74'	Hofmann M. 53' (o.g.); Friesenbichler 89'	3rd	22	+7	
14	31 October 2015 16:00	Sturm Graz	H	2–1	14,700	Hofmann S. 7'; Sonnleitner 78'	Kienast 50'	3rd	25	+8	
15	8 November 2015 16:30	Grödig	A	1–2	2,845	Tomi 75'	Venuto 34' (pen.) 76'	3rd	25	+7	
16	21 November 2015 18:30	Mattersburg	A	6–1	9,500	Kainz 5' 39'; Stangl 21'; Prosenik 29' 35'; Jelic 83'	Bürger 52'	3rd	28	+12	
17	29 November 2015 19:00	Rheindorf Altach	H	3–1	16,400	Stangl 25'; Grahovac 37'; Nutz 52'	Ngwat-Mahop 72'	3rd	31	+14	
18	2 December 2015 18:30	Admira Wacker Mödling	A	1–2	5,000	Alar 38'	Zwierschitz 53'; Spiridonovic 63' (pen.)	3rd	31	+13	
19	5 December 2015 18:30	Ried	H	2–1	12,700	Schwab 22'; Schobesberger 76'	Murg 19'	3rd	34	+14	
20	13 December 2015 16:30	Red Bull Salzburg	A	0–2	14,150		Soriano 36'; Keïta 56'	3rd	34	+12	
21	6 February 2016 18:30	Wolfsberger AC	H	3–0	13,700	Schobesberger 56'; Pavelic 60'; Jelic 62'		3rd	37	+15	
22	14 February 2016 16:30	Austria Wien	A	3–0	12,000	Murg 9'; Hofmann S. 14' (pen.); Jelic 72'		2nd	40	+18	
23	21 February 2016 16:30	Sturm Graz	A	2–0	12,500	Schobesberger 12' 71'		2nd	43	+20	
24	27 February 2016 14:00	Grödig	H	3–2	14,200	Jelic 21' 90+1'; Schwab 85'	Maak 7'; Schütz 66'	2nd	46	+21	
25	2 March 2016 18:30	Mattersburg	H	3–0	13,200	Hofmann S. (penalty missed); Schwab 36'; Stangl 44'; Kainz 87'		1st	49	+24	
26	6 March 2016 16:30	Rheindorf Altach	A	0–0	5,649			2nd	50	+24	
27	12 March 2016 18:30	Admira Wacker Mödling	H	0–4	12,300		Knasmüllner 7' 25'; Grozurek 53' (pen.); Spiridonovic 63'	2nd	50	+20	
28	20 March 2016 16:30	Ried	A	0–1	5,700		Kreuzer 57'	2nd	50	+19	
29	2 April 2016	Red Bull Salzburg	H	1–1	24,800	Schaub 46'	Caleta-Car 75'	2nd	51	+19	
30	9 April 2016 18:30	Wolfsberger AC	A	2–2	6,000	Tomi 13'; Schaub 43'	Ouedraogo 83'; Schmerböck 90+4'	2nd	52	+19	
31	17 April 2016 16:30	Austria Wien	H	1–0	26,200	Tomi 58'		2nd	55	+20	
32	23 April 2016	Sturm Graz	H	2–0	16,200	Grahovac 24'; Kainz 55'		2nd	58	+22	
33	30 April 2016 16:00	Grödig	A	0–2	2,246		Rasner 36'; Kerschbaum 62'	2nd	58	+20	
34	8 May 2016 16:30	Mattersburg	A	2–0	4,500	Pavelic 17'; Prosenik 90+2'		2nd	61	+22	
35	11 May 2016 20:30	Rheindorf Altach	H	1–1	14,200	Schwab 88'	Netzer 22'	2nd	62	+22	
36	15 May 2016 17:30	Admira Wacker Mödling	A	3–1	5,500	Schaub 12'; Schwab 63'; Sonnleitner 85'	Grozurek 87'	2nd	65	+24	

=== League table ===
Pos	Team	Pld	W	D	L	GF	GA	GD	Pts	Qualification or relegation
1	Red Bull Salzburg (C)	36	21	11	4	71	33	+38	74	Qualification for the Champions League second qualifying round
2	Rapid Wien	36	20	5	11	66	42	+24	65	Qualification for the Europa League third qualifying round
3	Austria Wien	36	17	8	11	65	48	+17	59	Qualification for the Europa League second qualifying round
4	Admira Wacker Mödling	36	13	11	12	45	51	−6	50	Qualification for the Europa League first qualifying round
5	Sturm Graz	36	12	12	12	40	40	0	48	

Source: weltfussball.de (in German), Soccerway
Rules for classification: 1) Points; 2) Less matches awarded against; 3) Goal difference; 4) Goals scored; 5) Matches won; 6) Away matches won; 7) Head-to-head points; 8) Head-to-head goal difference; 9) Head-to-head goals scored.
(C) Champions

=== Results summary ===
Overall								Home						Away					
Pld	W	D	L	GF	GA	GD	Pts	W	D	L	GF	GA	GD	W	D	L	GF	GA	GD
36	20	5	11	66	33	+33	65	12	2	4	35	20	+15	8	3	7	31	13	+18

Last updated: 15 May 2016.

== Austrian Cup ==
=== Austrian Cup fixtures and results ===
Win Loss Postponed

Round	Date	Opponent	Venue	Result F–A	Attendance	Goalscorers and disciplined players		Ref.
Round	Date	Opponent	Venue	Result F–A	Attendance	Rapid Wien	Opponent	Ref.
1st	17 July 2015	SC Weiz	A	5–1	2,525	Kainz 2' 6'; Schobesberger 7'; Beric 68'; Friedl 87' (o.g.)	Steiner 10'	
2nd	23 September 2015	SKU Amstetten	A	1–1 (4–3 p)	3,300	Kainz 7'; Sonnleitner (red card) 17'	Vukovic 18' (pen.)	
R16	28 October 2015	Austria Salzburg	H	5–1	9,400	Schobesberger 8' 10'; Prosenik 69'; Tomi 81'; Alar 87'	Kaufmann 75'	
QF	10 February 2016	Admira Wacker	H	0–1	5,500	Schwab (penalty missed)	Grozurek 87'; Schößwendter (yellow card) 90+3' (red card)	

== Champions League ==
=== Champions League fixtures and results ===
Win Draw Loss Postponed

==== Qualifying rounds ====
Leg	Date	Opponent	Venue	Result F–A	Agg. score F–A	Attendance	Goalscorers and disciplined players		Ref.
Leg	Date	Opponent	Venue	Result F–A	Agg. score F–A	Attendance	Rapid Wien	Opponent	Ref.
Third qualifying round
FL	29 July 2015	Ajax (Netherlands)	H	2–2	—	43,200	Kainz 48'; Schwab (red card) 59'; Berić 76'	Klaassen 25' 43'	
SL	4 August 2015	Ajax (Netherlands)	A	3–2	5–4	53,502	Berić 12'; Schaub 39' 77'	Milik 52'; Gudelj 75'	
Playoff round
FL	19 August 2015	Shakhtar Donetsk (Ukraine)	H	0–1	—	46,000		Marlos 44'	
SL	25 August 2015	Shakhtar Donetsk (Ukraine)	A	2–2	2–3	28,400	Schaub 13'; Hofmann S. 22'; Sonnleitner (yellow card) 88' (red card)	Marlos 10'; Hladkyy 27'	

== Europa League ==
=== Group stage ===
==== Table ====
Pos	Team	Pld	W	D	L	GF	GA	GD	Pts	Qualification
1	(Austria) Rapid Wien	6	5	0	1	10	6	+4	15	Advance to knockout phase
2	(Spain) Villarreal	6	4	1	1	12	6	+6	13	Advance to knockout phase
3	(Czech Republic) Viktoria Plzeň	6	1	1	4	8	10	−2	4	
4	(Belarus) Dinamo Minsk	6	1	0	5	3	11	−8	3	

Source: Soccerway
Rules for classification: Group stage tiebreakers

==== Europa League fixtures and results ====
MD	Date	Opponent	Venue	Result F–A	Attendance	Goalscorers and disciplined players		Table		Ref.
MD	Date	Opponent	Venue	Result F–A	Attendance	Rapid Wien	Opponent	Pos.	Pts.	Ref.
1	17 September	Villarreal (Spain)	H	2–1	36,200	Schwab 50'; Hofmann S. 53' (pen.)	Baptistão 45'	2nd	3	
2	1 October	Dinamo Minsk (Belarus)	A	1–0	5,000	Hofmann S. 54'		1st	6	
3	22 October	Viktoria Plzeň (Czech Republic)	H	3–2	39,400	Hofmann S. 34'; Schaub 52'; Petsos 68'	Ďuriš 12'; Hrošovský 76'	1st	9	
4	5 November	Viktoria Plzeň (Czech Republic)	A	2–1	11,691	Schobesberger 13' 77'	Holenda 71'	1st	12	
5	26 November	Villarreal (Spain)	A	0–1	15,000		Bruno 78'	2nd	12	
6	10 December	Dinamo Minsk (Belarus)	H	2–1	34,800	Hofmann S. (penalty missed); Hofmann M. 29'; Jelic 59'	El Monir 64'	1st	15	

=== Knockout phase ===
==== Knockout phase results ====
Win Draw Loss

Leg	Date	Opponent	Venue	Result F–A	Agg. score F–A	Attendance	Goalscorers and disciplined players		Ref.
Leg	Date	Opponent	Venue	Result F–A	Agg. score F–A	Attendance	Rapid Wien	Opponent	Ref.
Round of 32
FL	18 February	Valencia CF (Spain)	A	0–6	–	28,800		Mina 4', 25'; Parejo 10'; Negredo 29'; Gomes 35'; Rodrigo 89'	
SL	25 February	Valencia CF (Spain)	H	0–4	0–10	39,800		Rodrigo 59'; Feghouli 63'; Piatti 72'; Vezo 88'	

== Team record ==
As of 15 May 2016

Competition	First match	Last match	Record								
Competition	First match	Last match	M	W	D	L	GF	GA	GD	Win %	Ref.
Bundesliga	25 July	15 May	36	20	5	11	66	42	+24	55.56	
ÖFB Cup	17 June	10 February	4	3	0	1	11	4	+7	75.00	
Europa League	17 September	25 February	8	5	0	3	10	16	−6	62.50	
Champions League	29 July	25 August	4	1	2	1	7	7	+0	25.00	
Total			52	29	7	16	94	69	+25	55.77	—

== Squad ==
=== Squad statistics ===
No.	Nat.	Name	Age	League		Austrian Cup		UEFA Competitions		Total		Discipline	
No.	Nat.	Name	Age	Apps	Goals	Apps	Goals	Apps	Goals	Apps	Goals	Yellow card	Red card
Goalkeepers
1	(Slovakia)	Ján Novota	31	12				9		21		2	
21	(Austria)	Tobias Knoflach	21	1+1						1+1			
30	(Austria)	Richard Strebinger	22	23		4		3+1		30+1			1
Defenders
4	(Austria)	Thomas Schrammel	27	4+1		1				5+1			
6	(Austria)	Mario Sonnleitner	28	27	3	4		10		41	3	5	2
17	(Austria)	Christopher Dibon	24	22+1	1	1+1		8		31+2	1	7	
20	(Austria)	Maximilian Hofmann	21	21+1		3		6+2	1	30+3	1	8	
22	(Austria)	Mario Pavelic	21	23+3	2	1+1		10		34+4	2	3	
23	(Austria)	Stefan Stangl	23	25+1	5	2		8+1		35+2	5	1	
24	(Austria)	Stephan Auer	24	18+1		3		5+1		26+2		6	
31	(Croatia)	Dino Kovačec	21	0+1						0+1			
36	(Austria)	Michael Schimpelsberger	24	2		1				3			
39	(Austria)	Maximilian Wöber	17					1		1			
40	(Hungary)	Attila Szalai	17	1						1			
Midfielders
5	(Greece)	Thanos Petsos	24	18+2	1	3		10	1	31+2	2	6	
7	(Austria)	Philipp Schobesberger	21	23+10	6	3	3	4+6	2	30+16	11	1	
8	(Austria)	Stefan Schwab	24	34+2	8	1+3		9+1	1	44+6	9	7	1
10	(Austria)	Louis Schaub	20	15+9	5	2		6+2	4	23+11	9	2	
11	(Germany)	Steffen Hofmann	34	22+7	4	0+2		11	4	33+9	8	7	
14	(Austria)	Florian Kainz	22	31+2	7	3	3	11	1	45+2	11	7	
15	(Bosnia and Herzegovina)	Srđan Grahovac	22	20+6	2	2		6+5		28+11	2	7	
19	(Austria)	Stefan Nutz	23	7+4	1	2				9+4	1		
27	(Austria)	Andreas Kuen	20	0+2						0+2			
29	(Austria)	Thomas Murg	20	3+4	1	0+1		1+1		4+6	1		
33	(Austria)	Deni Alar	25	5+14	3	1+1	1	2+4		8+19	4	1	
Forwards
9	(Croatia)	Matej Jelić	24	16+11	6	2+1		3+4	1	21+16	7	5	
28	(Spain)	Tomi Correa	30	7+5	3	1	1			8+5	4	2	
38	(Austria)	Philipp Prosenik	22	10+12	4	1+2	1	5+5		16+19	5	1	
Players who left after the start of the season
9	(Slovenia)	Robert Berić	24	3+2	3	1	1	4	2	8+2	6	2	
18	(Austria)	Philipp Huspek	24	3+3		1		0+3		4+6			
25	(Austria)	Dominik Wydra	21			1				1			

=== Goal scorers ===
Name	Bundesliga	Cup	UEFA Competitions	Total
(Austria) Florian Kainz	7	3	1	11
(Austria) Philipp Schobesberger	6	3	2	11
(Austria) Louis Schaub	5		4	9
(Austria) Stefan Schwab	8		1	9
(Germany) Steffen Hofmann	4		4	8
(Croatia) Matej Jelic	6		1	7
(Slovenia) Robert Beric	3	1	2	6
(Austria) Philipp Prosenik	4	1		5
(Austria) Stefan Stangl	5			5
(Austria) Deni Alar	3	1		4
(Spain) Tomi Correa	3	1		4
(Austria) Mario Sonnleitner	3			3
(Bosnia and Herzegovina) Srdan Grahovac	2			2
(Austria) Mario Pavelic	2			2
(Greece) Thanos Petsos	1		1	2
(Austria) Christopher Dibon	1			1
(Austria) Maximilian Hofmann			1	1
(Austria) Thomas Murg	1			1
(Austria) Stefan Nutz	1			1
Own goals
(Austria) Christian Friedl (Weiz)		1		1
(Austria) Michael Madl (Sturm Graz)	1			1
Totals	66	11	17	94

=== Transfers ===
==== In ====
No.	Pos.	Name	Age	Moved from	Type	Transfer Window	Contract ends	Transfer fee	Ref.
18	MF	(Austria) Philipp Huspek	24	(Austria) SV Grödig	End of contract	Summer	2018	Free	
28	FW	(Spain) Tomi Correa	30	(Austria) SV Grödig	End of contract	Summer	2017	Free	
19	MF	(Austria) Stefan Nutz	23	(Austria) SV Grödig	End of contract	Summer	2018	Free	
24	DF	(Austria) Stephan Auer	24	(Austria) Admira Wacker	End of contract	Summer	2018	Free	
30	GK	(Austria) Richard Strebinger	22	(Germany) Werder Bremen	Transfer	Summer	2019	€500,000	
9	FW	(Croatia) Matej Jelić	24	(Slovakia) MŠK Žilina	Transfer	Summer	2019	€800,000	
29	MF	(Austria) Thomas Murg	21	(Austria) SV Ried	Transfer	Winter	2019	€800,000	

==== Out ====
No.	Pos.	Name	Age	Moved to	Type	Transfer Window	Transfer fee	Ref.
34	FW	(Austria) Dominik Starkl	21	(Austria) Admira Wacker	Loan	Summer		
29	GK	(Croatia) Marko Maric	19	(Germany) TSG 1899 Hoffenheim	Transfer	Summer	€500,000	
3	DF	(Germany) Brian Behrendt	23	(Germany) Arminia Bielefeld	Transfer	Summer	€300,000	
25	MF	(Austria) Dominik Wydra	21	(Germany) SC Paderborn 07	Transfer	Summer	€600,000	
9	FW	(Slovenia) Robert Beric	24	(France) AS Saint-Etienne	Transfer	Summer	€5,500,000	
18	MF	(Austria) Philipp Huspek	24	(Austria) LASK	Loan	Winter		
