= 2017–18 HNK Rijeka season =

Rijeka
2017–18 season
- Chairman: Damir Mišković
- Manager: Matjaž Kek
- Stadium: Rujevica
- Prva HNL: 2nd
- Croatian Cup: Semi-final
- UEFA Champions League: Play-off round
- UEFA Europa League: Group stage
- Top goalscorer: League: Héber (16); All: Héber (17)
- Highest home attendance: 8,118 v (Austria) Red Bull Salzburg (2 August 2017)
- Lowest home attendance: 3,022 v Osijek (22 October 2017)
- Average home league attendance: 4,850
Home colours	Away colours	Third colours

The 2017–18 season was the 72nd season in HNK Rijeka’s history. It was their 27th successive season in the Croatian First Football League, and 44th successive top tier season.

== Competitions ==
=== Overall ===
Competition	First match	Last match	Starting round	Final position	Record							
Competition	First match	Last match	Starting round	Final position	G	W	D	L	GF	GA	GD	Win %
HT Prva liga	15 Jul 2017	19 May 2018	Matchday 1	Runners-up	36	22	4	10	75	32	+43	61.11
Croatian Cup	20 Sep 2017	4 Apr 2018	First round	Semi-final	4	3	0	1	8	5	+3	75.00
UEFA Champions League	11 Jul 2017	22 Aug 2017	Second qualifying round	Play-off round	6	2	2	2	9	5	+4	33.33
UEFA Europa League	14 Sep 2017	7 Dec 2017	Group stage	Group stage	6	2	1	3	11	12	−1	33.33
Total					52	29	7	16	103	54	+49	55.77

Last updated: 19 May 2018.

=== HT Prva liga ===
==== Classification ====
Pos	Team	Pld	W	D	L	GF	GA	GD	Pts	Qualification or relegation
1	Dinamo Zagreb (C)	36	22	7	7	68	34	+34	73	Qualification for the Champions League second qualifying round
2	Rijeka	36	22	4	10	75	32	+43	70	Qualification for the Europa League third qualifying round (Note: Since the winners of the 2017–18 Croatian Football Cup, Dinamo Zagreb, qualified for European competition based on league position, the spot awarded to the cup winners (Europa League third qualifying round) was passed to the runners-up, the spot awarded to the runners-up was passed to the third-placed team, and the spot awarded to the third-placed team was passed to the fourth-placed team.)
3	Hajduk Split	36	19	9	8	70	38	+32	66	Qualification for the Europa League second qualifying round
4	Osijek	36	14	14	8	53	38	+15	56	Qualification for the Europa League first qualifying round
5	Lokomotiva	36	14	9	13	47	48	−1	51	

Source: PrvaHNL.hr
Rules for classification: 1) Points; 2) Head-to-head points; 3) Head-to-head goal difference; 4) Head-to-head goals scored (at home if two teams tied); 5) Goal difference; 6) Goals scored; 7) Play-off
(Note: Criteria 2–4 and 7 is only used if deciding champion, teams to international competition or teams for relegation and in that case criteria 6 will not be used).
(C) Champions

==== Results summary ====
Overall								Home						Away					
Pld	W	D	L	GF	GA	GD	Pts	W	D	L	GF	GA	GD	W	D	L	GF	GA	GD
36	22	4	10	75	32	+43	70	14	1	3	49	13	+36	8	3	7	26	19	+7

Last updated: 19 May 2018.
Source: Competitive matches

==== Results by round ====
Round	1	2	3	4	5	6	7	8	9	10	11	12	13	14	15	16	17	18	19	20	21	22	23	24	25	26	27	28	29	30	31	32	33	34	35	36
Ground	H	H	H	A	H	H	A	H	A	A	A	A	H	A	A	H	A	H	H	H	H	A	H	H	A	H	A	A	A	A	H	A	A	H	A	H
Result	W	W	W	L	L	W	W	W	W	D	W	L	L	L	L	D	W	L	W	W	W	L	W	W	W	W	D	W	L	W	W	W	L	W	D	W
Position	4	2	1	2	3	4	3	2	2	2	2	2	2	3	3	4	2	4	4	4	3	4	3	3	3	3	3	3	3	3	3	2	2	2	2	2

Updated to match(es) played on 19 May 2018. Source: Competitive matches
A = Away; H = Home; W = Win; D = Draw; L = Loss

==== Results by opponent ====
Team	Results				Points
Team	1	2	3	4	Points
Cibalia	7–0	2–1	5–1	0–0	10
Dinamo Zagreb	0–2	1–3	4–1	1–0	6
Hajduk Split	2–0	1–2	1–1	3–1	7
Inter Zaprešić	3–1	0–0	3–0	5–1	10
Istra 1961	2–0	0–1	4–0	1–0	9
Lokomotiva	2–1	0–1	3–1	0–1	6
Osijek	0–1	1–2	1–2	1–0	3
Rudeš	4–1	5–1	3–0	2–4	9
Slaven Belupo	2–0	1–1	2–0	3–1	10

Source: 2017–18 Croatian First Football League article

=== UEFA Europa League ===
==== Group stage ====
Pos	Team	Pld	W	D	L	GF	GA	GD	Pts	Qualification	MIL	AEK	RJK	AW
1	(Italy) Milan	6	3	2	1	13	6	+7	11	Advance to knockout phase	—	0–0	3–2	5–1
2	(Greece) AEK Athens	6	1	5	0	6	5	+1	8	Advance to knockout phase	0–0	—	2–2	2–2
3	(Croatia) Rijeka	6	2	1	3	11	12	−1	7		2–0	1–2	—	1–4
4	Austria Wien	6	1	2	3	9	16	−7	5		1–5	0–0	1–3	—

Source: UEFA
Rules for classification: Group stage tiebreakers

== Matches ==
=== HT Prva liga ===
15 July 2017 1	Rijeka	2–0	Slaven Belupo	Rijeka
21:00 CEST (UTC+02:00)	Gorgon 22'; Bradarić (yellow card) 49' (yellow-red card) 56'; Vešović 72'	Report	Ivanovski (yellow card) 49'; Bouadla (yellow card) 70'	Stadium: Rujevica; Attendance: 5,004; Referee: Duje Strukan (Split)

22 July 2017 2	Rijeka	4–1	Rudeš	Rijeka
21:00 CEST (UTC+02:00)	Maleš (yellow card) 13'; Kvržić 25'; Župarić 45'; Vešović (yellow card) 64'; Mesarić 79' (o.g.); Gavranović 88'	Report	Havojić (yellow card) 7'; Borevković (yellow card) 10'; Ivančić (yellow card) 44'; Aralica 62'; Lulić (yellow card) 80'	Stadium: Rujevica; Attendance: 4,533; Referee: Bruno Marić (Daruvar)

29 July 2017 3	Rijeka	2–0	Istra 1961	Rijeka
21:00 CEST (UTC+02:00)	Jelić (yellow card) 13'; Vešović (yellow card) 56'; Gorgon 65'; Gojković 75' (o.g.)	Report	Prelčec (yellow card) 23'	Stadium: Rujevica; Attendance: 5,504; Referee: Ivan Vučković (Zagreb)

7 August 2017 4	Osijek	1–0	Rijeka	Osijek
21:00 CEST (UTC+02:00)	Barišić 18' (pen.); Škorić (yellow card) 30'; Lukić (yellow card) 65'; Grezda (yellow card) 81'	Report	Elez (yellow card) 17'; Gavranović (yellow card) 30'; Vešović (yellow card) 33' (yellow-red card) 35'; Kvržić (yellow card) 48'; Mišić (yellow card) 59'; Maleš (yellow card) 71' (yellow-red card) 90+2'	Stadium: Gradski Vrt; Attendance: 5,155; Referee: Fran Jović (Zagreb)

11 August 2017 5	Rijeka	0–2	Dinamo Zagreb	Rijeka
19:00 CEST (UTC+02:00)	Gorgon (yellow card) 42'; Župarić (yellow card) 50'	Report	Fernandes 11', 40' (pen.); Stojanović (yellow card) 21'; Lecjaks (yellow card) 50' (yellow-red card) 58'; Benković (yellow card) 69'	Stadium: Rujevica; Attendance: 7,258; Referee: Tihomir Pejin (Donji Miholjac)

19 August 2017 6	Rijeka	2–1	Lokomotiva	Rijeka
21:00 CEST (UTC+02:00)	Martić (yellow card) 24'; Đoković (yellow card) 49'; Punčec (yellow card) 67'; Bradarić 81'; Matei (penalty missed) 84' 90+4'	Report	Majer 16'; Šunjić (yellow card) 31'; Ivanušec (yellow card) 83'; Kolar (yellow card) 90+2'	Stadium: Rujevica; Attendance: 4,622; Referee: Duje Strukan (Split)

26 August 2017 7	Inter Zaprešić	1–3	Rijeka	Zaprešić
21:00 CEST (UTC+02:00)	Puljić 54'; Nekić (yellow card) 79'	Report	Héber 6', 34'; Gavranović 56'; Punčec (yellow card) 88'	Stadium: ŠRC Zaprešić; Attendance: 777; Referee: Damir Batinić (Osijek)

9 September 2017 8	Rijeka	7–0	Cibalia	Rijeka
17:00 CEST (UTC+02:00)	Gavranović 2'; Gorgon 5', 42', 90+2'; Héber 50'; Bradarić 52'; Zuta (yellow card) 60'; Mišić 68'	Report	Rubić (yellow card) 39'	Stadium: Rujevica; Attendance: 4,944; Referee: Goran Gabrilo (Split)

17 September 2017 9	Hajduk Split	0–2	Rijeka	Split
17:00 CEST (UTC+02:00)	Said (yellow card) 86'	Report	Župarić (yellow card) 16'; Héber 24', 58'; Elez (yellow card) 88'	Stadium: Poljud; Attendance: 18,108; Referee: Igor Pajač (Sveti Ivan Zelina)

23 September 2017 10	Slaven Belupo	1–1	Rijeka	Koprivnica
19:00 CEST (UTC+02:00)	Vrljičak (yellow card) 63'; Međimorec 78'; Kendeš (yellow card) 90'	Report	Héber 59'	Stadium: Gradski; Attendance: 891; Referee: Fran Jović (Zagreb)

1 October 2017 11	Rudeš	1–5	Rijeka	Zagreb
19:00 CEST (UTC+02:00)	Budimir 29'; Barbarić (yellow card) 77'	Report	Mišić 8' (yellow card) 42'; Héber (yellow card) 44' (goal) 54', 60'; Gavranović (yellow card) 48' (goal) 50', 89'; Puljić (yellow card) 49'	Stadium: Kranjčevićeva; Attendance: 751; Referee: Bruno Marić (Daruvar)

14 October 2017 12	Istra 1961	1–0	Rijeka	Pula
15:00 CEST (UTC+02:00)	Puclin 17'; Vojnović (yellow card) 22'; Kitanovski (yellow card) 75'; Ivušić (yellow card) 82' (yellow-red card) 90+5'; Ofosu (yellow card) 90+2'	Report	Matei (yellow card) 68'; Elez (yellow card) 69'; Zuta (yellow card) 90+2'	Stadium: Aldo Drosina; Attendance: 2,040; Referee: Damir Batinić (Osijek)

22 October 2017 13	Rijeka	1–2	Osijek	Rijeka
19:00 CEST (UTC+02:00)	Maleš (yellow card) 33'; Mišić (yellow card) 44'; Vešović (yellow card) 45+2'; Gavranović 55'; Kvržić (yellow card) 89'	Report	Bočkaj (yellow card) 17' (goal) 79'; Grezda (yellow card) 33' (goal) 62'; Mudražija (yellow card) 47'; Ejupi (yellow card) 89'; Šimunec (yellow card) 90+1'	Stadium: Rujevica; Attendance: 3,022; Referee: Goran Gabrilo (Split); Marko Matoc (Zaprešić) (from 25')

28 October 2017 14	Dinamo Zagreb	3–1	Rijeka	Zagreb
15:00 CEST (UTC+02:00)	Moro 29'; Soudani 49', 89'	Report	Acosty 9'; Pavičić (yellow card) 27'; Maleš (yellow card) 45'; Kvržić (yellow card) 69'; Bradarić (yellow card) 82'	Stadium: Maksimir; Attendance: 8,556; Referee: Igor Pajač (Sveti Ivan Zelina)

5 November 2017 15	Lokomotiva	1–0	Rijeka	Zagreb
15:00 CET (UTC+01:00)	Capan 16'; Musa (yellow card) 45'; Krstanović (yellow card) 65'; Kolinger (yellow card) 69'; Oluić (yellow card) 72'; Šunjić (yellow card) 83'	Report	Župarić (yellow card) 42'; Gorgon (yellow card) 83'	Stadium: Kranjčevićeva; Attendance: 980; Referee: Igor Pajač (Sveti Ivan Zelina)

18 November 2017 16	Rijeka	0–0	Inter Zaprešić	Rijeka
18:00 CET (UTC+01:00)	Vešović (yellow card) 90'; Pavičić (yellow card) 90+3'	Report	Andrić (yellow card) 24'; Šarić (yellow card) 90'; Mamić (yellow card) 90+2'; Mazalović (yellow card) 90+3'	Stadium: Rujevica; Attendance: 4,892; Referee: Marin Vidulin (Kanfanar)

26 November 2017 17	Cibalia	1–2	Rijeka	Vinkovci
18:00 CET (UTC+01:00)	Pervan 32'; Muženjak (yellow card) 37'; Rubić (yellow card) 43'	Report	Gorgon 18'; Gavranović 23'	Stadium: HNK Cibalia; Attendance: 410; Referee: Duje Strukan (Split)

2 December 2017 18	Rijeka	1–2	Hajduk Split	Rijeka
18:00 CET (UTC+01:00)	Bradarić 11'; Pavičić (yellow card) 37'; Zuta (yellow card) 65'; Gavranović (penalty missed) 68'; Gorgon (yellow card) 74'	Report	Bašić 3' (yellow card) 8'; Erceg (yellow card) 43' (goal) 51'; Gentsoglou (yellow card) 68'; Barry (yellow card) 70'; Ismajli (yellow card) 71'; Letica (yellow card) 90+4'	Stadium: Rujevica; Attendance: 6,349; Referee: Igor Pajač (Sveti Ivan Zelina)

10 December 2017 19	Rijeka	2–0	Slaven Belupo	Rijeka
17:00 CET (UTC+01:00)	Punčec 11' (yellow card) 89'; Črnic 87'	Report	Bouadla (yellow card) 26'; Arap (yellow card) 54'; Vidović (yellow card) 85'	Stadium: Rujevica; Attendance: 3,150; Referee: Duje Strukan (Split)

17 December 2017 20	Rijeka	3–0	Rudeš	Rijeka
17:00 CET (UTC+01:00)	Acosty 6'; Mišić (yellow card) 46'; Vešović 63'; Puljić 90+2'	Report	Muić (yellow card) 14'; Antonio Cristian (yellow card) 39'; Fazli (yellow card) 56'	Stadium: Rujevica; Attendance: 3,440; Referee: Dario Kulušić (Šibenik)

10 February 2018 21	Rijeka	4–0	Istra 1961	Rijeka
15:00 CET (UTC+01:00)	Puljić 33'; Čolak 49'; Črnic 57'; Bradarić (yellow card) 59'; Zuta 89'	Report	Ottochian (yellow card) 21'; Jakić (yellow card) 54'; Vojnović (yellow card) 70'	Stadium: Rujevica; Attendance: 4,151; Referee: Bruno Marić (Daruvar)

17 February 2018 22	Osijek	2–1	Rijeka	Osijek
15:00 CET (UTC+01:00)	Grgić 49'; Hajradinović 56' (pen.); Boban (yellow card) 73'	Report	Župarić (red card) 6'; Pavičić 87'	Stadium: Gradski Vrt; Attendance: 3,125; Referee: Duje Strukan (Split)

4 March 2018 24	Rijeka	3–1	Lokomotiva	Rijeka
17:00 CET (UTC+01:00)	Héber 23'; Leovac (yellow card) 33'; Punčec (yellow card) 54'; Čolak 76'; Kvržić 90+1'	Report	Šunjić (yellow card) 25'; Majstorović 40'; Havojić (yellow card) 74'; Krstanović (yellow card) 74'	Stadium: Rujevica; Attendance: 4,254; Referee: Goran Gabrilo (Split)

7 March 2018 23	Rijeka	4–1	Dinamo Zagreb	Rijeka
17:00 CET (UTC+01:00)	Kvržić (yellow card) 11'; Héber 19', 60' (yellow card) 42'; Punčec (yellow card) 33'; Pavičić 48'; Leovac (yellow card) 65'; Zuta (yellow card) 71'; Župarić (yellow card) 74'; Puljić 87'	Report	Lešković (yellow card) 2' (yellow-red card) 27'; Gavranović 16' (yellow card) 20'; Ademi (yellow card) 63'; Sosa (yellow card) 66'	Stadium: Rujevica; Attendance: 4,572; Referee: Damir Batinić (Osijek)

11 March 2018 25	Inter Zaprešić	0–3	Rijeka	Zaprešić
15:00 CET (UTC+01:00)	Grgić (yellow card) 46'; Čeliković (yellow card) 51'	Report	Pavičić 11'; Héber 12'; Bradarić (yellow card) 44'; Acosty 65'	Stadium: ŠRC Zaprešić; Attendance: 586; Referee: Mario Zebec (Cestica)

18 March 2018 26	Rijeka	5–1	Cibalia	Rijeka
17:00 CET (UTC+01:00)	Héber 33', 60', 69'; Čolak 36' (pen.); Leovac (yellow card) 42'; Puljić 79'	Report	Barišić (yellow card) 65'; Galić 84'	Stadium: Rujevica; Attendance: 4,351; Referee: Ivan Vučković (Zagreb)

31 March 2018 27	Hajduk Split	1–1	Rijeka	Split
17:00 CEST (UTC+02:00)	Ismajli (yellow card) 8'; Said (yellow card) 45+1'; Caktaš 62' (pen.); Kovačević (yellow card) 90+2'	Report	Raspopović (yellow card) 14'; Čolak (yellow card) 30' (yellow-red card) 90+4' (goal) 52'; Zuta (yellow card) 42'; Župarić (yellow card) 45'; Punčec (yellow card) 90+1'	Stadium: Poljud; Attendance: 15,690; Referee: Igor Pajač (Sveti Ivan Zelina)

8 April 2018 28	Slaven Belupo	1–3	Rijeka	Koprivnica
17:00 CEST (UTC+02:00)	Brezovec (yellow card) 28'; Ivanovski 65' (pen.)	Report	Čolak (yellow card) 22' (goal) 38'; Acosty 32'; Puljić 78'; Grahovac (yellow card) 83'	Stadium: Gradski; Attendance: 915; Referee: Fran Jović (Zagreb)

13 April 2018 29	Rudeš	4–2	Rijeka	Zagreb
18:00 CEST (UTC+02:00)	Borevković 2'; Kamenar 4'; Pavic (yellow card) 27' (yellow-red card) 87'; Segado (yellow card) 31'; Galilea (yellow card) 37'; Budimir 48', 66' (pen.); Fazli (yellow card) 85'	Report	Župarić (yellow card) 25' (yellow-red card) 66'; Héber 34'; Puljić (yellow card) 39'; Pavičić (yellow card) 48' (goal) 60'	Stadium: Kranjčevićeva; Attendance: 327; Referee: Dario Bel (Osijek)

17 April 2018 30	Istra 1961	0–1	Rijeka	Pula
20:00 CEST (UTC+02:00)		Report	Kvržić 76'	Stadium: Aldo Drosina; Attendance: 1,637; Referee: Bruno Marić (Daruvar)

21 April 2018 31	Rijeka	1–0	Osijek	Rijeka
19:00 CEST (UTC+02:00)	Puljić 88'	Report	Lyopa (yellow card) 26'; Marić (yellow card) 37' (yellow-red card) 74'; Boban (yellow card) 90+2'	Stadium: Rujevica; Attendance: 5,101; Referee: Fran Jović (Zagreb)

28 April 2018 32	Dinamo Zagreb	0–1	Rijeka	Zagreb
17:00 CEST (UTC+02:00)		Report	Acosty 39'	Stadium: Maksimir; Attendance: 5,017; Referee: Bruno Marić (Daruvar)

4 May 2018 33	Lokomotiva	1–0	Rijeka	Zagreb
18:00 CEST (UTC+02:00)	Radonjić 13'; Krstanović (yellow card) 25'; Datković (yellow card) 29'	Report	Gorgon (yellow card) 30'	Stadium: Kranjčevićeva; Attendance: 986; Referee: Duje Strukan (Split)

8 May 2018 34	Rijeka	5–1	Inter Zaprešić	Rijeka
20:00 CEST (UTC+02:00)	Gorgon 2'; Acosty 39'; Grahovac (yellow card) 52'; Puljić 60'; Zuta 73'; Kvržić 79'	Report	Prenga 89'	Stadium: Rujevica; Attendance: 5,115; Referee: Ivan Vučković (Zagreb)

13 May 2018 35	Cibalia	0–0	Rijeka	Vinkovci
17:00 CEST (UTC+02:00)	Peričić (yellow card) 34'; Tomašević (yellow card) 81' (red card) 88'	Report		Stadium: HNK Cibalia; Attendance: 783; Referee: Bruno Marić (Daruvar)

19 May 2018 36	Rijeka	3–1	Hajduk Split	Rijeka
17:00 CEST (UTC+02:00)	Čolak 2' (yellow card) 46'; Pavičić 36'; Gorgon (yellow card) 65'; Leovac (yellow card) 77'; Puljić 90+5'	Report	López (yellow card) 6' (yellow-red card) 62'; Said 50' (yellow card) 81'; Ismajli (yellow card) 55'	Stadium: Rujevica; Attendance: 7,039; Referee: Fran Jović (Zagreb)

Source: Croatian Football Federation

=== Croatian Cup ===
20 September 2017 R1	Vrbovec	1–3	Rijeka	Vrbovec
15:30 CEST (UTC+02:00)	Bradić (yellow card) 66'; Ćosić (yellow card) 74'; N. Jendriš (yellow card) 81'; D. Colarić 86'	Report	Puljić 29'; Jelić 43', 84' (yellow card) 74'; Pavičić (yellow card) 50'	Stadium: Kraj Sajmišta; Attendance: 1,200; Referee: Bruno Marić (Daruvar)

14 November 2017 R2	Gorica	0–3	Rijeka	Velika Gorica
13:00 CET (UTC+01:00)	Masłowski (yellow card) 36'; Marina (yellow card) 50'	Report	Pavičić 57'; Gavranović 81'; Kvržić 84'	Stadium: Stadion Radnik; Attendance: 1,187; Referee: Igor Križarić (Čakovec)

13 December 2017 QF	Inter Zaprešić	1–2	Rijeka	Rijeka
17:00 CET (UTC+01:00)	Blažević 30'; Mazalović (yellow card) 36' (yellow-red card) 90'; Šarić (yellow card) 38'	Report	Puljić 31'; Gavranović 39'; Mišić (yellow card) 45+2'; Maleš (yellow card) 53'; Mavrias (yellow card) 78'	Stadium: Rujevica; Attendance: 2,287; Referee: Fran Jović (Zagreb)

4 April 2018 SF	Dinamo Zagreb	3–0	Rijeka	Zagreb
17:30 CEST (UTC+02:00)	Stojanović (yellow card) 15'; Hajrović 24'; Sosa (yellow card) 25'; Gavranović (yellow card) 59'; Soudani 80'; Ćorić 82'	Report	Župarić (yellow card) 17'; Bradarić (yellow card) 24' (yellow-red card) 47'; Acosty (yellow card) 70'	Stadium: Maksimir; Attendance: 6,037; Referee: Mario Zebec (Cestica)

Source: Croatian Football Federation

=== UEFA Champions League ===
11 July 2017 QR2	Rijeka (Croatia)	2–0	(Wales) The New Saints	Rijeka, Croatia
20:45 CEST (UTC+02:00)	Mišić 4'; Matei 68'	Report		Stadium: Rujevica; Attendance: 5,833; Referee: Kristo Tohver (Estonia)

18 July 2017 QR2	The New Saints (Wales)	1–5 (1–7 agg.)	(Croatia) Rijeka	Oswestry, England
20:00 CEST (UTC+02:00)	Cieślewicz 69'; Routledge (yellow card) 74'	Report	Matei 41'; Gavranović 54', 79'; Gorgon 61'; Ristovski 64'	Stadium: Park Hall; Attendance: 1,150; Referee: Georgi Kabakov (Bulgaria)

26 July 2017 QR3	Red Bull Salzburg (Austria)	1–1	(Croatia) Rijeka	Wals-Siezenheim, Austria
18:45 CEST (UTC+02:00)	Hwang (yellow card) 42' (goal) 49'; Ulmer (yellow card) 82'	Report	Gavranović 30'; Vešović (yellow card) 45'; Župarić (yellow card) 79'	Stadium: Red Bull Arena; Attendance: 12,714; Referee: Daniel Stefański (Poland)

2 August 2017 QR3	Rijeka (Croatia)	0–0 (1–1 agg.)	(Austria) Red Bull Salzburg	Rijeka, Croatia
20:45 CEST (UTC+02:00)	Maleš (yellow card) 62'; Mišić (yellow card) 70'; Bradarić (yellow card) 84'	Report	Ćaleta-Car (yellow card) 7'; Yabo (yellow card) 45+2'; Samassékou (yellow card) 51'; Paulo Miranda (yellow card) 90+5'	Stadium: Rujevica; Attendance: 8,118; Referee: Hüseyin Göçek (Turkey)

16 August 2017 PO	Olympiacos (Greece)	2–1	(Croatia) Rijeka	Piraeus, Greece
20:45 CEST (UTC+02:00)	Gillet (yellow card) 37'; Odjidja-Ofoe (yellow card) 64' (goal) 66'; Romao 90+3'	Report	Elez (yellow card) 19'; Héber 42' (yellow card) 81'; Zuta (yellow card) 49' (yellow-red card) 83'; Maleš (yellow card) 52'	Stadium: Georgios Karaiskakis; Attendance: 21,352; Referee: Felix Zwayer (Germany)

22 August 2017 PO	Rijeka (Croatia)	0–1 (1–3 agg.)	(Greece) Olympiacos	Rijeka, Croatia
20:45 CEST (UTC+02:00)	Martić (yellow card) 38'; Mišić (yellow card) 68'	Report	Romao (yellow card) 9'; Marin 25'; Kapino (yellow card) 59'; Sebá (yellow card) 86'; Carcela (yellow card) 89'	Stadium: Rujevica; Attendance: 8,105; Referee: Danny Makkelie (Netherlands)

Source: uefa.com

=== UEFA Europa League ===
14 September 2017 GS	Rijeka (Croatia)	1–2	(Greece) AEK Athens	Rijeka, Croatia
19:00 CEST (UTC+02:00)	Elez 29'; Mišić (yellow card) 39'; Bradarić (yellow card) 42'	Report	Mantalos 16'; Christodoulopoulos 62'; Hélder Lopes (yellow card) 64'; Simões (yellow card) 71'; Araujo (yellow card) 87'	Stadium: Rujevica; Attendance: 5,932; Referee: John Beaton (Scotland)

28 September 2017 GS	Milan (Italy)	3–2	(Croatia) Rijeka	Milan, Italy
21:05 CEST (UTC+02:00)	André Silva 14'; Musacchio 53'; Cutrone 90+4'	Report	Bradarić (yellow card) 43'; Elez (yellow card) 82' (goal) 90' (pen.); Acosty 84'	Stadium: San Siro; Attendance: 23,917; Referee: Orel Grinfeeld (Israel)

19 October 2017 GS	Austria Wien	1–3	(Croatia) Rijeka	Vienna, Austria
21:05 CEST (UTC+02:00)	Monschein (yellow card) 23'; Salamon (yellow card) 61'; Klein (yellow card) 71'; Friesenbichler 90'	Report	Gavranović 21', 31' (yellow card) 50'; Elez (yellow card) 62'; Sluga (yellow card) 90'; Kvržić 90+2'	Stadium: Ernst-Happel-Stadion; Attendance: 20,690; Referee: Sandro Schärer (Switzerland)

2 November 2017 GS	Rijeka (Croatia)	1–4	Austria Wien	Rijeka, Croatia
19:00 CET (UTC+01:00)	Héber (yellow card) 28'; Pavičić 61'; Mišić (red card) 72'; Vešović (yellow card) 90+3'	Report	Friesenbichler (yellow card) 9'; Holzhauser (yellow card) 30'; Prokop 41', 62'; Pires (yellow card) 43'; Serbest 73'; Monschein 83'	Stadium: Rujevica; Attendance: 7,912; Referee: Jakob Kehlet (Denmark)

23 November 2017 GS	AEK Athens (Greece)	2–2	(Croatia) Rijeka	Marousi, Greece
21:05 CET (UTC+01:00)	Hélder Lopes (yellow card) 40'; Araujo 45+2'; Christodoulopoulos 55'	Report	Gorgon 8', 26' (yellow card) 18'; Maleš (yellow card) 23'; Acosty (yellow card) 66'; Gavranović (yellow card) 80'	Stadium: Olympic Stadium; Attendance: 17,100; Referee: Mattias Gestranius (Finland)

7 December 2017 GS	Rijeka (Croatia)	2–0	(Italy) Milan	Rijeka, Croatia
19:00 CET (UTC+01:00)	Puljić 7'; Maleš (yellow card) 43'; Gavranović 47'	Report	André Silva (yellow card) 32'; Antonelli (yellow card) 66'; Locatelli (yellow card) 78'	Stadium: Rujevica; Attendance: 8,021; Referee: István Vad (Hungary)

Source: uefa.com

=== Friendlies ===
==== Pre-season ====
21 June 2017 Friendly	Rijeka (Croatia)	2–0	(North Macedonia) Rabotnički	Kranjska Gora, Slovenia
18:00 CEST (UTC+02:00)	Matei 59'; Héber 61'	Report		Stadium: Športni park Rudeč; Attendance: Behind closed doors Referee: Andrej Žnidaršič (Kranj)

24 June 2017 Friendly	Triglav Kranj (Slovenia)	1–1	(Croatia) Rijeka	Kranj, Slovenia
18:00 CEST (UTC+02:00)	Bojić 64'	Report	Héber 13'	Stadium: Stanko Mlakar; Attendance: 800; Referee: Andrej Žnidaršič (Kranj)

27 June 2017 Friendly	Rijeka (Croatia)	3–1	(Romania) Astra Giurgiu	Kranj, Slovenia
17:30 CEST (UTC+02:00)	Gavranović 8'; Matei 23', 43'	Report	Biceanu 90'	Stadium: Stanko Mlakar; Attendance: Behind closed doors Referee: David Šmajc (Kranj)

30 June 2017 Friendly	Rijeka (Croatia)	1–0	(Russia) Lokomotiv Moscow	Villach, Austria
18:00 CEST (UTC+02:00)	Župarić 31'	Report		Stadium: Landskron; Attendance: Behind closed doors Referee: Christian Maier (Villach)

5 July 2017 Friendly	Rijeka (Croatia)	5–1	(Slovenia) Celje	Rijeka, Croatia
20:00 CEST (UTC+02:00)	Gavranović 7'; Héber 27'; Gorgon 35'; Punčec 86'; Džinić 90' (o.g.)	Report	Lupeta 37'	Stadium: Rujevica; Attendance: 3,268; Referee: Ivan Bebek (Rijeka)

==== On-season (2017) ====
1 September 2017 Friendly	Rijeka (Croatia)	9–0	(Slovenia) Brinje-Grosuplje	Rijeka, Croatia
	Jelić 39', 50'; Acosty 47'; Héber 65', 68'; Mišić 78'; Gorgon 83', 88'; Pavičić 90'	Report		Stadium: Rujevica (training ground); Attendance: Behind closed doors

5 September 2017 Friendly	Rijeka	21–0	Borac Bakar	Rijeka
	Acosty 6', 8', 18', 27', 45'; Puljić 32', 35', 44', 58'; Gavranović 52', 60', 69', 71', 77', 87', 90'; Kvržić 61', 65', 68'; Matei 63'; Gomelt 83'	Report		Stadium: Rujevica (training ground); Attendance: Behind closed doors Referee: Vedran Jelenčić (Kastav)

6 October 2017 Friendly	Rijeka (Croatia)	2–0	(Slovenia) Ankaran	Umag, Croatia
16:00 CEST (UTC+02:00)	Jelić 34'; Héber 80'	Report		Stadium: SC Istraturist; Referee: Saša Kapular (Brtonigla)

10 October 2017 Friendly	Orijent 1919	0–2	Rijeka	Rijeka
17:00 CEST (UTC+02:00)		Report	Jelić 33'; Črnic 59'	Stadium: Krimeja; Attendance: 2,000; Referee: Marko Cvijović (Rijeka)

==== Mid-season ====
17 January 2018 Friendly	Rijeka (Croatia)	10–0	(Slovenia) Brinje-Grosuplje	Rijeka, Croatia
17:30 CET (UTC+01:00)	Jelić 1', 8', 44'; Dangubić 17', 41'; Héber 25'; Župarić 34'; Puljić 52', 65'; Ristovski 82'	Report		Stadium: Rujevica (training ground); Attendance: Behind closed doors Referee: Marko Cvijović (Rijeka)

20 January 2018 Friendly	Rijeka (Croatia)	0–0	(Slovenia) Gorica	Rijeka, Croatia
17:00 CET (UTC+01:00)		Report		Stadium: Rujevica; Attendance: 1,014; Referee: Ivan Bebek (Rijeka)

25 January 2018 Friendly	Rijeka (Croatia)	1–0	(Hungary) Ferencváros	Albufeira, Portugal
16:00 GMT (UTC±00:00)	Héber 78'	Report		Stadium: Estádio Municipal de Albufeira; Referee: Nuno Almeida (Portugal)

29 January 2018 Atlantic Cup	Rijeka (Croatia)	1–2	(Denmark) Aarhus	Algarve, Portugal
15:00 GMT (UTC±00:00)	Ristovski 73'	Report	Sana 45' (pen.); Pedersen 55'	Stadium: Estádio Algarve; Attendance: 100; Referee: Bruno Rebocho (Portugal)

30 January 2018 Friendly	Rijeka (Croatia)	0–2	(Germany) Waldhof Mannheim	Albufeira, Portugal
11:00 GMT (UTC±00:00)		Report	Korte 43', 51'	Stadium: Estádio Municipal de Albufeira; Attendance: 100; Referee: Nuno Almeida (Portugal)

2 February 2018 Atlantic Cup	Rijeka (Croatia)	1–1	(Sweden) Norrköping	Parchal, Portugal
15:00 GMT (UTC±00:00)	Fjóluson 68' (o.g.)	Report	Jakobsen 3'	Stadium: Estádio Municipal da Bela Vista; Attendance: 150; Referee: João Malheiro Pinto (Portugal)

6 February 2018 Friendly	Rijeka (Croatia)	2–0	(Slovenia) Krško	Rijeka, Croatia
15:30 CET (UTC+01:00)	Pavičić 58'; Črnic 65'	Report		Stadium: Rujevica; Attendance: 300; Referee: Vedran Jelenčić (Kastav)

==== On-season (2018) ====
14 March 2018 Friendly	Rijeka	7–0	Otočac	Rijeka
	Črnic 7'; Gorgon 19'; Kvržić 21', 69'; Dangubić 31', 67'; Acosty 46'	Report		Stadium: Rujevica (training ground); Attendance: Behind closed doors Referee: Marko Cvijović (Rijeka)

27 March 2018 Friendly	Rijeka	7–0	Vinodol	Rijeka
17:00 CEST (UTC+02:00)	Acosty 5'; Dangubić 36', 45'; Črnic 43'; Bojinov 53' (pen.); Vuk 58', 63'	Report		Stadium: Rujevica (training ground); Attendance: 100; Referee: Vedran Jelenčić (Kastav)

24 April 2018 Friendly	Rijeka (Croatia)	11–0	(Slovenia) Žiri	Rijeka, Croatia
18:00 CEST (UTC+02:00)	Črnic 4', 45'; Bojinov 16', 30', 65', 83'; Kvržić 23'; Čolak 46', 80'; Escoval 70'; Kuqi 87'	Report		Stadium: Rujevica (training ground); Attendance: 100; Referee: Zvonko Radić (Kastav)

== Player seasonal records ==
Updated 19 May 2018. Competitive matches only.

=== Goals ===
Rank	Name	1. HNL	Europe	Cup	Total
1	(Brazil) Héber	16	1	–	17
2	(Switzerland) Mario Gavranović	7	6	2	15
3	(Croatia) Jakov Puljić	8	1	2	11
4	(Austria) Alexander Gorgon	7	3	–	10
5	(Ghana) Maxwell Acosty	6	1	–	7
5	(Croatia) Domagoj Pavičić	5	1	1	7
7	(Croatia) Antonio Čolak	6	–	–	6
7	(Bosnia and Herzegovina) Zoran Kvržić	4	1	1	6
9	(Croatia) Filip Bradarić	3	–	–	3
9	(Croatia) Josip Mišić	2	1	–	3
9	(Romania) Florentin Matei	1	2	–	3
12	(Slovenia) Matic Črnic	2	–	–	2
12	(Montenegro) Marko Vešović	2	–	–	2
12	(North Macedonia) Leonard Zuta	2	–	–	2
12	(Croatia) Josip Elez	–	2	–	2
12	(Croatia) Matej Jelić	–	–	2	2
17	(Croatia) Roberto Punčec	1	–	–	1
17	(Croatia) Dario Župarić	1	–	–	1
17	(North Macedonia) Stefan Ristovski	–	1	–	1
Own goals		2	–	–	2
TOTALS		75	20	8	103

Source: Competitive matches

=== Clean sheets ===
Rank	Name	1. HNL	Europe	Cup	Total
1	(Croatia) Simon Sluga	10	3	–	13
2	(Croatia) Andrej Prskalo	3	–	1	4
TOTALS		13	3	1	17

Source: Competitive matches

=== Disciplinary record ===
Number	Position	Player	1. HNL			Europe			Cup			Total		
Number	Position	Player	Booked	(yellow card) (yellow-red card)	Sent off (straight red)	Booked	(yellow card) (yellow-red card)	Sent off (straight red)	Booked	(yellow card) (yellow-red card)	Sent off (straight red)	Booked	(yellow card) (yellow-red card)	Sent off (straight red)
4	DF	(Croatia) Roberto Punčec	6	0	0	0	0	0	0	0	0	6	0	0
7	MF	(Bosnia and Herzegovina) Zoran Kvržić	4	0	0	0	0	0	0	0	0	4	0	0
8	DF	(North Macedonia) Leonard Zuta	5	0	0	0	1	0	0	0	0	5	1	0
9	FW	(Brazil) Héber	2	0	0	2	0	0	0	0	0	4	0	0
10	MF	(Romania) Florentin Matei	1	0	0	0	0	0	0	0	0	1	0	0
12	GK	(Croatia) Simon Sluga	0	0	0	1	0	0	0	0	0	1	0	0
13	DF	(Croatia) Dario Župarić	5	1	1	1	0	0	1	0	0	7	1	1
14	MF	(Ghana) Maxwell Acosty	0	0	0	1	0	0	1	0	0	2	0	0
15	MF	(Bosnia and Herzegovina) Srđan Grahovac	2	0	0	0	0	0	0	0	0	2	0	0
17	FW	(Croatia) Antonio Čolak	2	1	0	0	0	0	0	0	0	2	1	0
17	FW	(Switzerland) Mario Gavranović	2	0	0	2	0	0	0	0	0	4	0	0
18	DF	(Croatia) Josip Elez	3	0	0	3	0	0	0	0	0	6	0	0
20	MF	(Austria) Alexander Gorgon	5	0	0	1	0	0	0	0	0	6	0	0
21	FW	(Croatia) Jakov Puljić	2	0	0	0	0	0	0	0	0	2	0	0
23	MF	(Croatia) Damjan Đoković	1	0	0	0	0	0	0	0	0	1	0	0
24	MF	(Croatia) Domagoj Pavičić	4	0	0	0	0	0	1	0	0	5	0	0
26	DF	(Croatia) Marin Leovac	4	0	0	0	0	0	0	0	0	4	0	0
26	MF	(Croatia) Mate Maleš	3	1	0	4	0	0	1	0	0	8	1	0
27	MF	(Croatia) Josip Mišić	4	0	0	3	0	1	1	0	0	8	0	1
28	MF	(Croatia) Filip Bradarić	3	1	0	3	0	0	0	1	0	6	2	0
29	DF	(Montenegro) Momčilo Raspopović	1	0	0	0	0	0	0	0	0	1	0	0
29	DF	(Montenegro) Marko Vešović	4	1	0	2	0	0	0	0	0	6	1	0
35	DF	(Greece) Charalampos Mavrias	0	0	0	0	0	0	1	0	0	1	0	0
77	DF	(Switzerland) Ivan Martić	1	0	0	1	0	0	0	0	0	2	0	0
90	FW	(Croatia) Matej Jelić	1	0	0	0	0	0	1	0	0	2	0	0
TOTALS			65	5	1	24	1	1	7	1	0	96	7	2

Source: nk-rijeka.hr

=== Appearances and goals ===
Number	Position	Player	Apps	Goals	Apps	Goals	Apps	Goals	Apps	Goals
Number	Position	Player	Total		1. HNL (Note: First number represents appearances in starting eleven, while the second number indicates a substitute appearance.)		Europe		Croatian Cup	
3	DF	(Australia) Jason Davidson	1	0	0+0	0	0+0	0	1+0	0
4	DF	(Croatia) Roberto Punčec	33	1	26+1	1	1+2	0	3+0	0
6	DF	(Portugal) João Escoval	7	0	5+2	0	0+0	0	0+0	0
6	DF	(North Macedonia) Stefan Ristovski	7	1	3+0	0	4+0	1	0+0	0
7	MF	(Bosnia and Herzegovina) Zoran Kvržić	43	6	17+13	4	5+4	1	2+2	1
8	DF	(North Macedonia) Leonard Zuta	49	2	34+1	2	9+1	0	4+0	0
9	FW	(Brazil) Héber	33	17	18+5	16	8+1	1	1+0	0
10	MF	(Romania) Florentin Matei	14	3	5+3	1	1+4	2	1+0	0
10	FW	(Bulgaria) Valeri Bojinov	2	0	0+1	0	0+0	0	0+1	0
11	MF	(Slovenia) Matic Črnic	26	2	4+13	2	0+6	0	3+0	0
12	GK	(Croatia) Simon Sluga	39	0	27+0	0	9+0	0	3+0	0
13	DF	(Croatia) Dario Župarić	46	1	31+0	1	12+0	0	3+0	0
14	MF	(Ghana) Maxwell Acosty	31	7	17+5	6	4+2	1	1+2	0
15	MF	(Bosnia and Herzegovina) Srđan Grahovac	15	0	14+0	0	0+0	0	1+0	0
17	FW	(Croatia) Antonio Čolak	16	6	14+2	6	0+0	0	0+0	0
17	FW	(Switzerland) Mario Gavranović	29	15	14+3	7	9+1	6	1+1	2
18	MF	(Croatia) Josip Elez	26	2	11+2	0	11+0	2	1+1	0
20	MF	(Austria) Alexander Gorgon	35	10	18+5	7	10+0	3	1+1	0
21	FW	(Croatia) Jakov Puljić	32	11	9+16	8	2+2	1	3+0	2
21	FW	(Nigeria) Goodness Ajayi	1	0	0+1	0	0+0	0	0+0	0
23	MF	(Croatia) Damjan Đoković	3	0	1+1	0	0+1	0	0+0	0
24	MF	(Croatia) Domagoj Pavičić	34	7	20+6	5	4+1	1	3+0	1
26	DF	(Croatia) Marin Leovac	10	0	9+0	0	0+0	0	1+0	0
26	MF	(Croatia) Mate Maleš	28	0	11+4	0	6+4	0	2+1	0
27	MF	(Croatia) Josip Mišić	32	3	17+2	2	10+0	1	3+0	0
28	MF	(Croatia) Filip Bradarić	42	3	27+2	3	11+0	0	1+1	0
29	DF	(Montenegro) Marko Vešović	29	2	14+2	2	12+0	0	1+0	0
29	DF	(Montenegro) Momčilo Raspopović	8	0	8+0	0	0+0	0	0+0	0
31	MF	(Croatia) Luka Capan	11	0	4+7	0	0+0	0	0+0	0
32	GK	(Croatia) Andrej Prskalo	14	0	9+0	0	3+1	0	1+0	0
35	DF	(Greece) Charalampos Mavrias	10	0	4+2	0	0+1	0	2+1	0
77	DF	(Switzerland) Ivan Martić	7	0	2+3	0	1+1	0	0+0	0
77	MF	(North Macedonia) Milan Ristovski	1	0	0+1	0	0+0	0	0+0	0
90	FW	(Croatia) Matej Jelić	12	2	3+4	0	0+3	0	1+1	2
99	MF	(Bosnia and Herzegovina) Jasmin Čeliković	1	0	0+1	0	0+0	0	0+0	0

Source: nk-rijeka.hr

=== Suspensions ===
Date Incurred	Competition	Player	Games Missed	Reason
15 Jul 2017	1. HNL	(Croatia) Filip Bradarić	1	(yellow card) (yellow-red card)
7 Aug 2017	1. HNL	(Montenegro) Marko Vešović	1	(yellow card) (yellow-red card)
7 Aug 2017	1. HNL	(Croatia) Mate Maleš	1	(yellow card) (yellow-red card)
16 Aug 2017	UCL	(North Macedonia) Leonard Zuta	1	(yellow card) (yellow-red card)
14 Oct 2017	1. HNL	(Croatia) Josip Elez	1	Booked
22 Oct 2017	1. HNL	(Croatia) Josip Mišić	1	Booked
22 Oct 2017	1. HNL	(Montenegro) Marko Vešović	1	Booked
28 Oct 2017	1. HNL	(Croatia) Mate Maleš	1	Booked
28 Oct 2017	1. HNL	(Bosnia and Herzegovina) Zoran Kvržić	1	Booked
2 Nov 2017	UEL	(Croatia) Josip Mišić	3	Sent off (straight red)
5 Nov 2017	1. HNL	(Croatia) Dario Župarić	1	Booked
2 Dec 2017	1. HNL	(Croatia) Domagoj Pavičić	1	Booked
2 Dec 2017	1. HNL	(North Macedonia) Leonard Zuta	1	Booked
2 Dec 2017	1. HNL	(Austria) Alexander Gorgon	1	Booked
10 Dec 2017	1. HNL	(Croatia) Roberto Punčec	1	Booked
17 Feb 2018	1. HNL	(Croatia) Dario Župarić	1	Sent off (straight red)
11 Mar 2018	1. HNL	(Croatia) Filip Bradarić	1	Booked
18 Mar 2018	1. HNL	(Croatia) Marin Leovac	1	Booked
31 Mar 2018	1. HNL	(Croatia) Roberto Punčec	1	Booked
31 Mar 2018	1. HNL	(Croatia) Antonio Čolak	1	(yellow card) (yellow-red card)
4 Apr 2018	Cup	(Croatia) Filip Bradarić	3	(yellow card) (yellow-red card)
13 Apr 2018	1. HNL	(Croatia) Dario Župarić	1	(yellow card) (yellow-red card)

=== Penalties ===
For
Date	Competition	Player	Opposition	Scored?
19 Aug 2017	1. HNL	(Romania) Florentin Matei	Lokomotiva	✗
28 Sep 2017	UEL	(Croatia) Josip Elez	Milan	✓
2 Dec 2017	1. HNL	(Switzerland) Mario Gavranović	Hajduk Split	✗
18 Mar 2018	1. HNL	(Croatia) Antonio Čolak	Cibalia	✓
Against
Date	Competition	Goalkeeper	Opposition	Scored?
7 Aug 2017	1. HNL	(Croatia) Simon Sluga	Osijek	✓
11 Aug 2017	1. HNL	(Croatia) Simon Sluga	Dinamo Zagreb	✓
17 Feb 2018	1. HNL	(Croatia) Simon Sluga	Osijek	✓
31 March 2018	1. HNL	(Croatia) Simon Sluga	Hajduk Split	✓
8 April 2018	1. HNL	(Croatia) Simon Sluga	Slaven Belupo	✓
13 April 2018	1. HNL	(Croatia) Simon Sluga	Rudeš	✓

=== Overview of statistics ===
Statistic	Overall	1. HNL	Europe	Croatian Cup
Most appearances	Zuta (49)	Zuta (35)	Vešović & Župarić (12)	Kvržić & Zuta (4)
Most starts	Zuta (47)	Zuta (34)	Vešović & Župarić (12)	Zuta (4)
Most substitute appearances	Črnic & Kvržić (19)	Puljić (16)	Črnic (6)	Acosty & Kvržić (2)
Most minutes played	Zuta (4,219)	Zuta (3,066)	Župarić (1,080)	Zuta (360)
Top goalscorer	Héber (17)	Héber (16)	Gavranović (6)	Gavranović, Jelić & Puljić (2)
Most assists	Pavičić (12)	Pavičić (10)	Bradarić & Ristovski (3)	Gavranović (2)
Most yellow cards	Bradarić & Maleš (10)	Župarić (7)	Maleš (4)	Bradarić (2)
Most red cards	Bradarić & Župarić (2)	Župarić (2)	Mišić & Zuta (1)	Bradarić (1)
Last updated: 19 May 2018.

== Transfers ==
=== In ===
Date	Pos.	Player	Moving from	Type	Fee
14 Jun 2017	RB	(Croatia) Mihael Rebernik	(Slovenia) Aluminij	Return from loan	—N/a
15 Jun 2017	LB	(Nigeria) Jamilu Collins	(Croatia) Šibenik	Return from loan	—N/a
15 Jun 2017	DM	(Nigeria) Gerald Diyoke	(Croatia) Šibenik	Return from loan	—N/a
15 Jun 2017	GK	(Nigeria) Ayotunde Ikuepamitan	(Croatia) Šibenik	Return from loan	—N/a
15 Jun 2017	RW	(Bosnia and Herzegovina) Zoran Kvržić	(Moldova) Sheriff Tiraspol	Return from loan	—N/a
15 Jun 2017	GK	(Nigeria) David Nwolokor	(Bosnia and Herzegovina) Vitez	Return from loan	—N/a
15 Jun 2017	CF	(Nigeria) Theophilus Solomon	(Croatia) Istra 1961	Return from loan	—N/a
15 Jun 2017	CF	(Croatia) Dario Vizinger	(Croatia) Hrvatski Dragovoljac	Return from loan	—N/a
23 Jun 2017	CF	(Brazil) Héber Araujo dos Santos	(Croatia) Slaven Belupo	Transfer	€300,000
29 Jun 2017	CF	(Croatia) Filip Dangubić	(Slovenia) Krško	Return from loan	—N/a
30 Jun 2017	RW	(Croatia) Marin Tomasov	(Saudi Arabia) Al-Nassr	Return from loan	—N/a
1 Jul 2017	CB	(Croatia) Josip Elez	(Italy) Lazio	Transfer (buying option)	€450,000
4 Jul 2017	CM	(Croatia) Damjan Đoković	(Italy) Spezia	Transfer	Free
4 Jul 2017	CM	(Croatia) Tomislav Gomelt	(Italy) Bari	Transfer	€50,000
4 Jul 2017	CB	(Croatia) Roberto Punčec	(Germany) Union Berlin	Transfer	Free
4 Jul 2017	RB	(North Macedonia) Stefan Ristovski	(Italy) Spezia	Transfer	Free
4 Jul 2017	RW	(Montenegro) Marko Vešović	(Italy) Spezia	Transfer	Free
19 Jul 2017	AM	(North Macedonia) Milan Ristovski	(North Macedonia) Rabotnički	Loan (until 30/6/2018; option to buy)	—N/a
24 Jul 2017	CF	(Croatia) Matej Jelić	(Austria) Rapid Wien	Loan (until 30/6/2018; option to buy)	—N/a
31 Aug 2017	RB	(Greece) Charalampos Mavrias	(Germany) Karlsruhe	Transfer	Free
31 Aug 2017	RW	(Ghana) Maxwell Acosty	(Italy) Crotone	Loan (until 30/6/2018; buying obligation)	—N/a
31 Aug 2017	LB	(Australia) Jason Davidson	(England) Huddersfield Town	Transfer	Free
31 Aug 2017	SS	(Croatia) Jakov Puljić	(Croatia) Inter Zaprešić	Loan (until 14/6/2018; buying obligation)	—N/a
31 Aug 2017	CM	(Croatia) Domagoj Pavičić	(Croatia) Dinamo Zagreb	Loan (until 18/1/2018; option to buy)	—N/a
19 Jan 2018	DM	(Croatia) Luka Capan	(Croatia) Lokomotiva	Transfer	€100,000
19 Jan 2018	CB	(Portugal) João Escoval	(Croatia) Istra 1961	Transfer	Free
19 Jan 2018	CM	(Croatia) Domagoj Pavičić	(Croatia) Dinamo Zagreb	Player exchange for Gavranović	—N/a
23 Jan 2018	RB	(Montenegro) Momčilo Raspopović	(Montenegro) Budućnost Podgorica	Loan (until 15/6/2018; option to buy)	—N/a
30 Jan 2018	CF	(Croatia) Antonio Čolak	(Germany) 1899 Hoffenheim	Loan (until 30/6/2019; option to buy)	—N/a
2 Feb 2018	CF	(Croatia) Filip Dangubić	(Slovenia) Celje	Return from loan	—N/a
12 Feb 2018	CF	(Bulgaria) Valeri Bojinov	Free agent	Transfer	Free
12 Feb 2018	CM	(Croatia) Dominik Križanović	(Croatia) Cibalia	Transfer	€70,000
12 Feb 2018	LB	(Croatia) Marin Leovac	(Greece) PAOK	Loan (until 30/6/2018; option to buy)	—N/a
13 Feb 2018	DM	(Bosnia and Herzegovina) Srđan Grahovac	(Kazakhstan) Astana	Loan (until 31/12/2018; option to buy)	—N/a

Source: Glasilo Hrvatskog nogometnog saveza

=== Out ===
Date	Pos.	Player	Moving to	Type	Fee
15 Jun 2017	CB	(Croatia) Ante Kulušić	(Moldova) Sheriff Tiraspol	End of contract	Free
15 Jun 2017	RB	(Croatia) Mihael Rebernik	(Croatia) Slaven Belupo	End of contract	Free
26 Jun 2017	AM	(Croatia) Franko Andrijašević	(Belgium) Gent	Transfer	€4.3 million
30 Jun 2017	CF	(Slovenia) Roman Bezjak	(Germany) Darmstadt 98	End of loan	—N/a
30 Jun 2017	LB	(Nigeria) Jamilu Collins	(Germany) Paderborn 07	End of contract	Free
30 Jun 2017	CB	(Croatia) Josip Elez	(Italy) Lazio	End of loan	—N/a
30 Jun 2017	AM	(North Macedonia) Milan Ristovski	(North Macedonia) Rabotnički	End of loan	—N/a
30 Jun 2017	RB	(North Macedonia) Stefan Ristovski	(Italy) Spezia	End of loan	—N/a
30 Jun 2017	RW	(Montenegro) Marko Vešović	(Italy) Spezia	End of loan	—N/a
6 Jul 2017	CF	(Croatia) Dario Vizinger	(Slovenia) Rudar Velenje	Loan (until 15/6/2018)	—N/a
7 Jul 2017	CF	(Croatia) Tomislav Turčin	(Croatia) Rudeš	Loan (until 15/6/2018)	—N/a
11 Jul 2017	CF	(Croatia) Filip Dangubić	(Slovenia) Celje	Loan (until 15/6/2018)	—N/a
11 Jul 2017	DM	(Croatia) Bernardo Matić	(Bosnia and Herzegovina) Široki Brijeg	Loan (until 14/6/2018; option to buy)	—N/a
14 Jul 2017	CM	(Croatia) Dario Čanađija	(Slovenia) Olimpija Ljubljana	Loan (until 30/6/2018; option to buy)	—N/a
17 Jul 2017	DM	(Nigeria) Gerald Diyoke	(Slovenia) Krško	Loan (until 15/6/2018)	—N/a
31 Jul 2017	CB	(Nigeria) Bamidele Samuel Ayodeji	(Croatia) Varaždin	Loan (until 15/6/2018)	—N/a
31 Jul 2017	LB	(Nigeria) Muhammed Kabiru	(Croatia) Varaždin	Loan (until 15/6/2018)	—N/a
7 Aug 2017	RW	(Croatia) Marin Tomasov	(Kazakhstan) Astana	Loan (until 14/6/2018; option to buy)	—N/a
9 Aug 2017	RB	(North Macedonia) Stefan Ristovski	(Portugal) Sporting	Loan (until 29/6/2018; buying obligation)	€2.5 million
14 Aug 2017	GK	(Croatia) Ivan Nevistić	(Croatia) Varaždin	Loan (until 14/6/2018)	—N/a
17 Aug 2017	CF	(Nigeria) Theophilus Solomon	(Serbia) Partizan	Loan (until 15/6/2018; option to buy)	—N/a
21 Aug 2017	CB	(Montenegro) Aleksandar Šofranac	(Belgium) Cercle Brugge	Released (mutual consent)	Free
31 Aug 2017	RB	(Switzerland) Ivan Martić	(Romania) U Craiova	Released (mutual consent)	Free
4 Sep 2017	LW	(Nigeria) Goodness Ajayi	(Israel) Hapoel Ashkelon	Loan (until 30/6/2018)	—N/a
4 Sep 2017	CM	(Croatia) Damjan Đoković	(Romania) Cluj	Released (mutual consent)	Free
10 Jan 2018	CB	(Croatia) Josip Elez	(Germany) Hannover 96	Loan (until 30/6/2018; buying obligation)	€500,000
10 Jan 2018	RB	(Montenegro) Marko Vešović	(Poland) Legia Warsaw	Transfer	€450,000
11 Jan 2018	CM	(Croatia) Josip Mišić	(Portugal) Sporting	Transfer	€2.75 million
29 Jan 2018	CF	(Switzerland) Mario Gavranović	(Croatia) Dinamo Zagreb	Player exchange for Pavičić	—N/a
31 Jan 2018	LW	(Romania) Florentin Matei	(Romania) Astra Giurgiu	Loan (until 15/6/2018; option to buy)	—N/a
31 Jan 2018	CF	(Nigeria) Theophilus Solomon	(Cyprus) Omonia	Loan (until 15/6/2018)	—N/a
1 Feb 2018	CM	(Croatia) Tomislav Gomelt	(Spain) Lorca	Loan (until 30/6/2018)	—N/a
1 Feb 2018	AM	(Croatia) Matej Šantek	(Slovenia) Gorica	Loan (until 15/6/2018)	—N/a
2 Feb 2018	CF	(Croatia) Dario Vizinger	(Slovenia) Celje	Transfer	Free
12 Feb 2018	LB	(Australia) Jason Davidson	(Slovenia) Olimpija Ljubljana	Loan (until 30/6/2018; option to buy)	—N/a
12 Feb 2018	CM	(Croatia) Dominik Križanović	(Croatia) Cibalia	Loan (until 15/6/2018)	—N/a
26 Feb 2018	DM	(Croatia) Mate Maleš	(China) Dalian Yifang	Transfer	€450,000

Source: Glasilo Hrvatskog nogometnog saveza

Spending: ▼€970,000
Income: ▲€10,950,000
Expenditure: ▲€9,980,000
