= Matej Jelić =

Croatian footballer

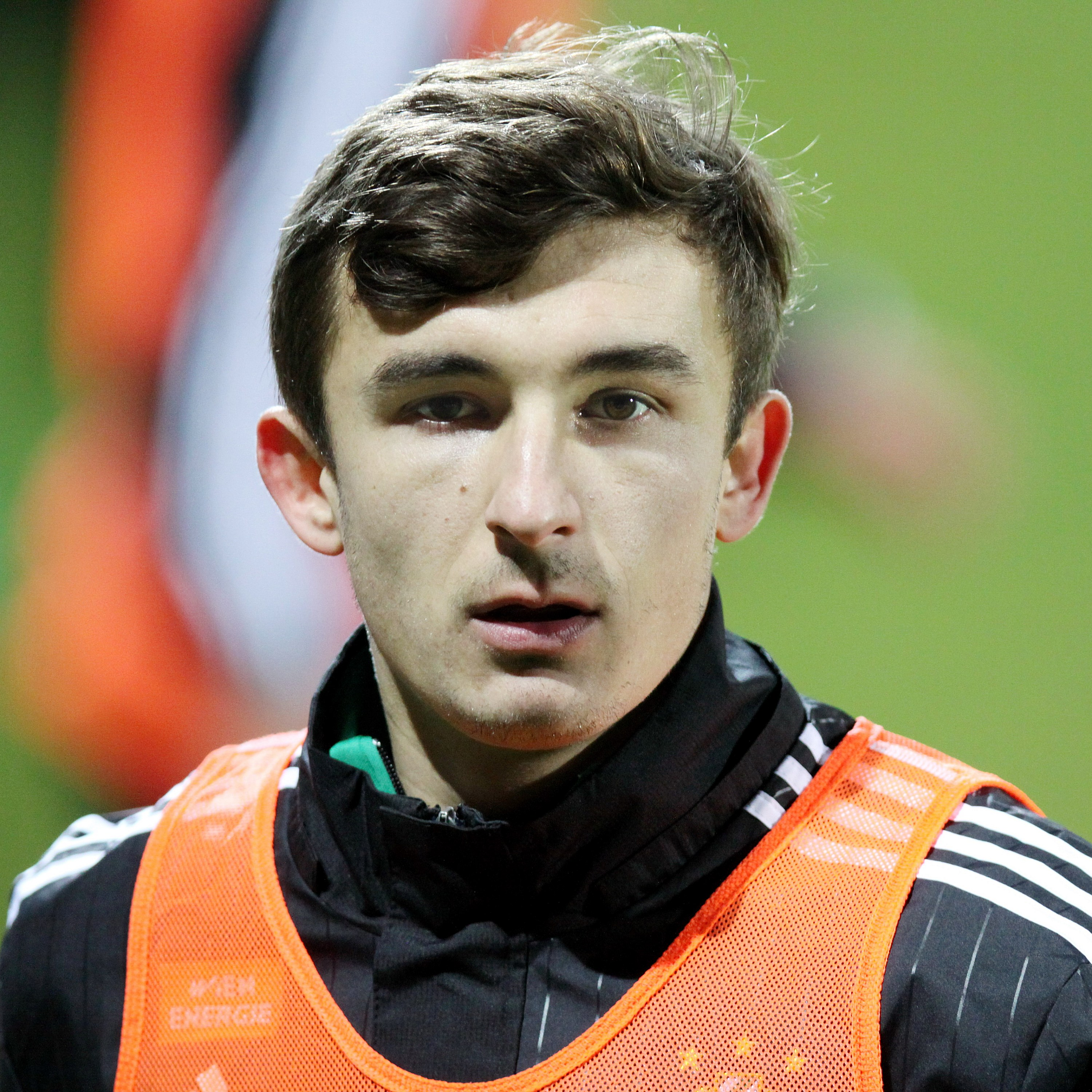
- Jelić with Rapid Wien in 2015

Personal information
- Full name: Matej Jelić
- Date of birth: 5 November 1990 (age 36)
- Place of birth: Našice, Croatia
- Height: 1.84 m (6 ft 0 in)
- Position: Forward

Team information
- Current team: NK Valpovka Valpovo
- Number: 22

Youth career
- 2003–2006: Mladost Črnkovci
- 2006–2008: Belišće
- 2008–2009: Dinamo Zagreb

Senior career*
Years	Team	Apps	(Gls)
2007–2008	Belišće	11	(1)
2008–2009	Dinamo Zagreb	0	(0)
2009–2010	Lokomotiva	42	(5)
2010–2012	Lučko	36	(14)
2012	Karlovac	9	(1)
2012–2013	Rudeš	23	(5)
2013–2015	Žilina	67	(29)
2015–2018	Rapid Wien	37	(6)
2017–2018	→ Rijeka (loan)	7	(0)
2018–2019	Slaven Belupo	24	(5)
2019–2020	Termalica Nieciecza	18	(2)
2021	Radnik Bijeljina	10	(2)
2021–2022	Cibalia	26	(3)
2023–	NK Valpovka Valpovo	46	(11)
- * Club domestic league appearances and goals as of 5 November 2024

Matej Jelić (born 5 November 1990) is a Croatian professional footballer who plays as a forward for NK Valpovka Valpovo.

== Club career ==
=== MŠK Žilina ===
Jelić joined MŠK Žilina in the summer of 2013. On 28 July 2013, he scored a goal on his competitive debut for Žilina in a 3–1 league victory over FC ViOn Zlaté Moravce. In the 2014–15 season, Jelić became the league's joint top scorer (alongside Jan Kalabiška) with 19 goals. Overall, he scored 29 goals for MŠK Žilina in 67 league appearances, he also added 8 goals in the qualifying rounds of the UEFA Europa League.

=== SK Rapid Wien ===
On 31 August 2015, MŠK Žilina announced the departure of Jelić to Austrian side SK Rapid Wien. He signed a four-year contract until the summer of 2019.

==== HNK Rijeka (loan) ====
On 21 July 2017, Jelić was loaned to HNK Rijeka until the end of the season, with a buying option.

== Career statistics ==
As of 20 May 2019

Appearances and goals by club, season and competition
Club	Season	League			National cup		Continental		Total	
Club	Season	Division	Apps	Goals	Apps	Goals	Apps	Goals	Apps	Goals
Belišće	2007–08	3. HNL	11	1	—		—		11	1
Dinamo Zagreb	2008–09	1. HNL	0	0	1	0	—		1	0
Lokomotiva	2008–09	2. HNL	14	4	—		—		14	4
Lokomotiva	2009–10	1. HNL	28	1	—		—		28	1
Lokomotiva	Total		42	5	—		—		42	5
Lučko	2010–11	2. HNL	29	14	—		—		29	14
Lučko	2011–12	1. HNL	7	0	—		—		7	0
Lučko	Total		36	14	—		—		36	14
Karlovac	2011–12	1. HNL	9	1	—		—		9	1
Rudeš	2012–13	2. HNL	23	5	—		—		23	5
Žilina	2013–14	Fortuna Liga	32	4	2	0	2	0	36	4
Žilina	2014–15	Fortuna Liga	29	19	3	2	—		32	21
Žilina	2015–16	Fortuna Liga	6	6	—		8	7	14	13
Žilina	Total		67	29	5	2	10	7	82	38
Rapid Wien	2015–16	Austrian Bundesliga	27	6	3	0	7	1	37	7
Rapid Wien	2016–17	Austrian Bundesliga	10	0	3	1	4	1	17	2
Rapid Wien	Total		37	6	6	1	11	2	54	9
Rijeka (loan)	2017–18	1. HNL	7	0	2	2	3	0	12	2
Slaven Belupo	2018–19	1. HNL	24	5	3	0	—		27	5
Career total			256	66	17	5	24	9	297	80

== Honours ==
Individual

- Slovak First Football League top scorer: 2014–15
