= Philipp Schobesberger =

Austrian footballer (born 1993)

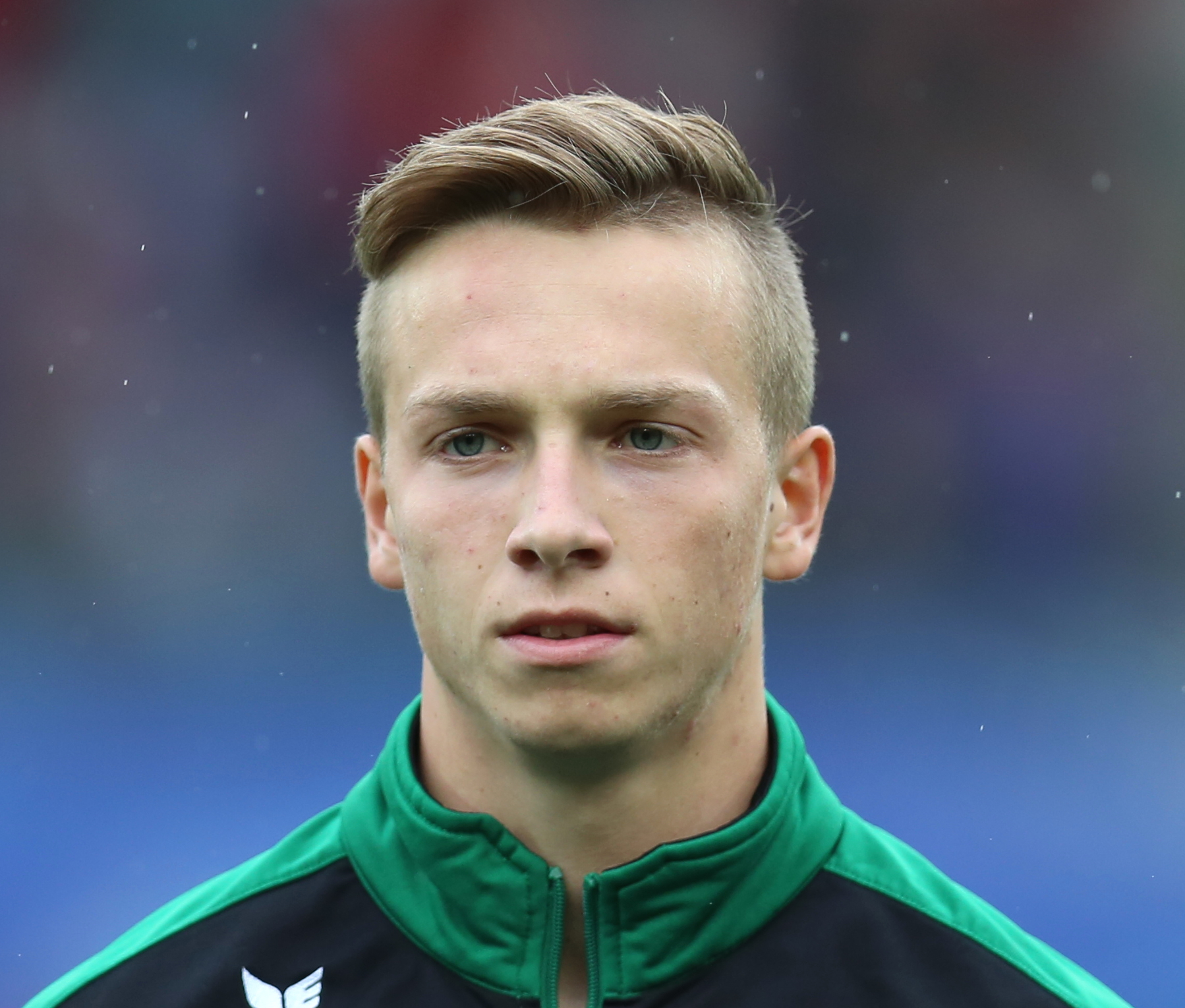
- Schobesberger in 2013

Personal information
- Date of birth: 10 December 1993 (age 32)
- Place of birth: Vienna, Austria
- Height: 1.76 m (5 ft 9 in)
- Position: Right winger

Team information
- Current team: FCM Traiskirchen
- Number: 7

Senior career*
| Years | Team | Apps | (Gls) |
| 2011–2014 | Pasching | 0 | (0) |
| 2014–2022 | Rapid Wien | 127 | (23) |
| 2021–2022 | Rapid Wien II | 6 | (0) |
| 2022 | SKU Amstetten | 9 | (2) |
| 2023 | ASKÖ Oedt | 6 | (1) |
| 2023–2024 | Wiener Viktoria | 24 | (11) |
| 2024– | FCM Traiskirchen | 52 | (24) |

International career
| 2017 | Austria | 1 | (0) |
- * Club domestic league appearances and goals as of 28 June 2026

Phillip Schobesberger (born 10 December 1993) is an Austrian professional footballer who plays as a right winger for Austrian Regionalliga club FCM Traiskirchen.

== Club career ==
=== Early career ===
Schobesberger won the 2012–13 Austrian Cup with Pasching.

=== Rapid Wien ===
Schobesberger transferred to Rapid Wien in the summer transfer window in 2014. His contract was originally scheduled to go to 2018. However, on 28 August 2015, he signed a one-year extension. He left the club at the end of his contract in summer 2022 after being plagued by injuries in the preceding years.

== International career ==
Schobesberger got his first call up to the senior Austria squad for a UEFA Euro 2016 qualifier against Russia in June 2015.

== Career statistics ==
=== Club ===
As of 3 June 2020

Appearances and goals by club, season and competition
| Club | Season | League | | | Cup | | Continental | | Other | | Total | |
| Club | Season | Division | Apps | Goals | Apps | Goals | Apps | Goals | Apps | Goals | Apps | Goals |
|---|---|---|---|---|---|---|---|---|---|---|---|---|
| Pasching | 2012–13 | Austrian Bundesliga | 0 | 0 | 6 | 0 | — | | — | | 6 | 0 |
| Pasching | 2013–14 | Austrian Bundesliga | 0 | 0 | 3 | 1 | 2 | 0 | — | | 5 | 1 |
| Pasching | Total | | 0 | 0 | 9 | 1 | 2 | 0 | — | | 11 | 1 |
| Rapid Wien | 2014–15 | Austrian Bundesliga | 27 | 8 | 3 | 1 | 0 | 0 | — | | 30 | 9 |
| Rapid Wien | 2015–16 | Austrian Bundesliga | 33 | 6 | 3 | 3 | 10 | 2 | — | | 46 | 11 |
| Rapid Wien | 2016–17 | Austrian Bundesliga | 5 | 0 | 1 | 0 | 4 | 0 | — | | 10 | 0 |
| Rapid Wien | 2017–18 | Austrian Bundesliga | 30 | 5 | 3 | 1 | — | | — | | 33 | 6 |
| Rapid Wien | 2018–19 | Austrian Bundesliga | 20 | 2 | 3 | 0 | 4 | 1 | — | | 27 | 3 |
| Rapid Wien | 2019–20 | Austrian Bundesliga | 11 | 2 | 2 | 0 | — | | — | | 13 | 2 |
| Rapid Wien | Total | | 126 | 23 | 15 | 5 | 18 | 3 | 0 | 0 | 159 | 31 |
| Career total | | | 126 | 23 | 24 | 6 | 20 | 3 | 0 | 0 | 170 | 32 |

== Honours ==
Pasching

- Austrian Cup: 2012–13
