= Srđan Grahovac =

Bosnian footballer (born 1992)

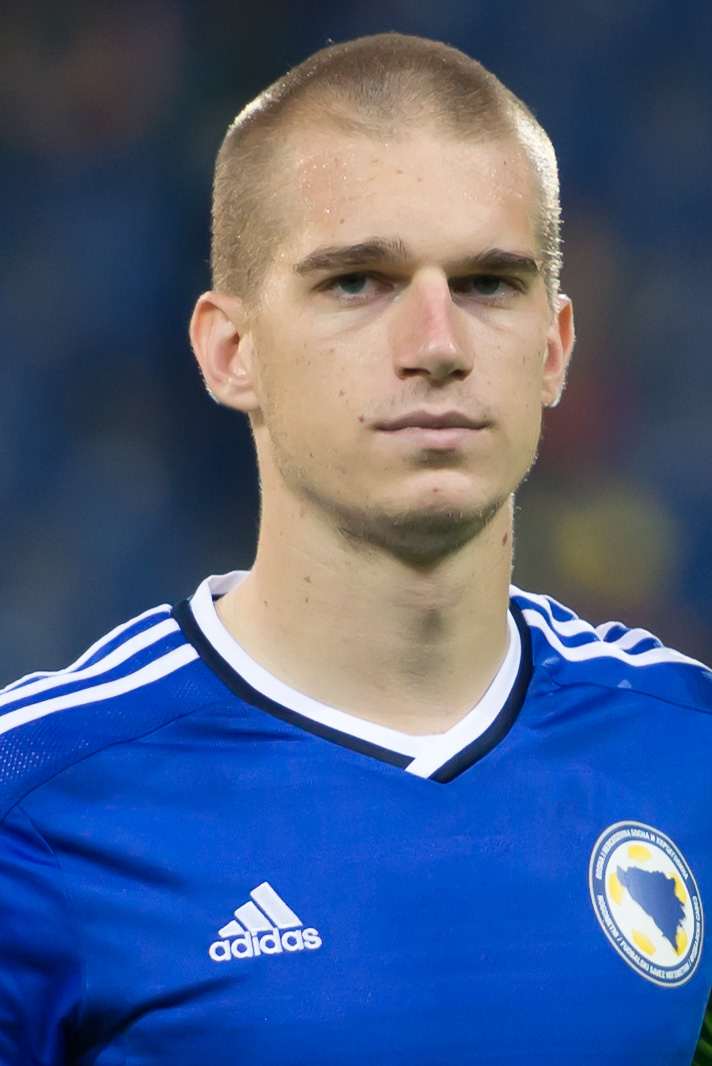
- Grahovac with Bosnia and Herzegovina U21 in 2014

Personal information
- Date of birth: 19 September 1992 (age 34)
- Place of birth: Banja Luka, Bosnia and Herzegovina
- Height: 1.82 m (6 ft 0 in)
- Position: Defensive midfielder

Team information
- Current team: Borac Banja Luka
- Number: 15

Youth career
- 2002–2009: Borac Banja Luka

Senior career*
| Years | Team | Apps | (Gls) |
| 2009–2014 | Borac Banja Luka | 116 | (6) |
| 2014–2018 | Rapid Wien | 59 | (4) |
| 2017 | → Astana (loan) | 26 | (8) |
| 2018–2019 | Astana | 0 | (0) |
| 2018 | → Rijeka (loan) | 26 | (0) |
| 2019–2022 | Rapid Wien | 77 | (2) |
| 2022–2023 | Rizespor | 7 | (0) |
| 2023– | Borac Banja Luka | 70 | (7) |

International career
| 2007–2008 | Bosnia and Herzegovina U17 | 6 | (1) |
| 2010 | Bosnia and Herzegovina U19 | 5 | (0) |
| 2011–2014 | Bosnia and Herzegovina U21 | 23 | (3) |
| 2016 | Bosnia and Herzegovina | 3 | (0) |
- * Club domestic league appearances and goals as of 26 May 2026

Srđan Grahovac (pronounced [sřdʑan grǎxoʋats]; born 19 September 1992) is a Bosnian professional footballer who plays as a defensive midfielder for Bosnian Premier League club Borac Banja Luka.

Grahovac started his professional career at Borac Banja Luka, before joining Rapid Wien in 2014. In 2017, he was sent on loan to Astana, with whom he signed permanently the following year. Later that year, he was loaned to Rijeka. In 2019, he went back to Rapid Wien. Three years later, Grahovac moved to Rizespor. He returned to Borac Banja Luka in 2023.

A former youth international for Bosnia and Herzegovina, Grahovac made his senior international debut in 2016, earning 3 caps.

== Club career ==
=== Early career ===
Grahovac came through the youth academy of his hometown club Borac Banja Luka, which he joined in 2002. He made his professional debut against Laktaši on 1 August 2009 at the age of 16. On 27 February 2011, he scored his first professional goal in a triumph over Široki Brijeg.

=== Rapid Wien ===
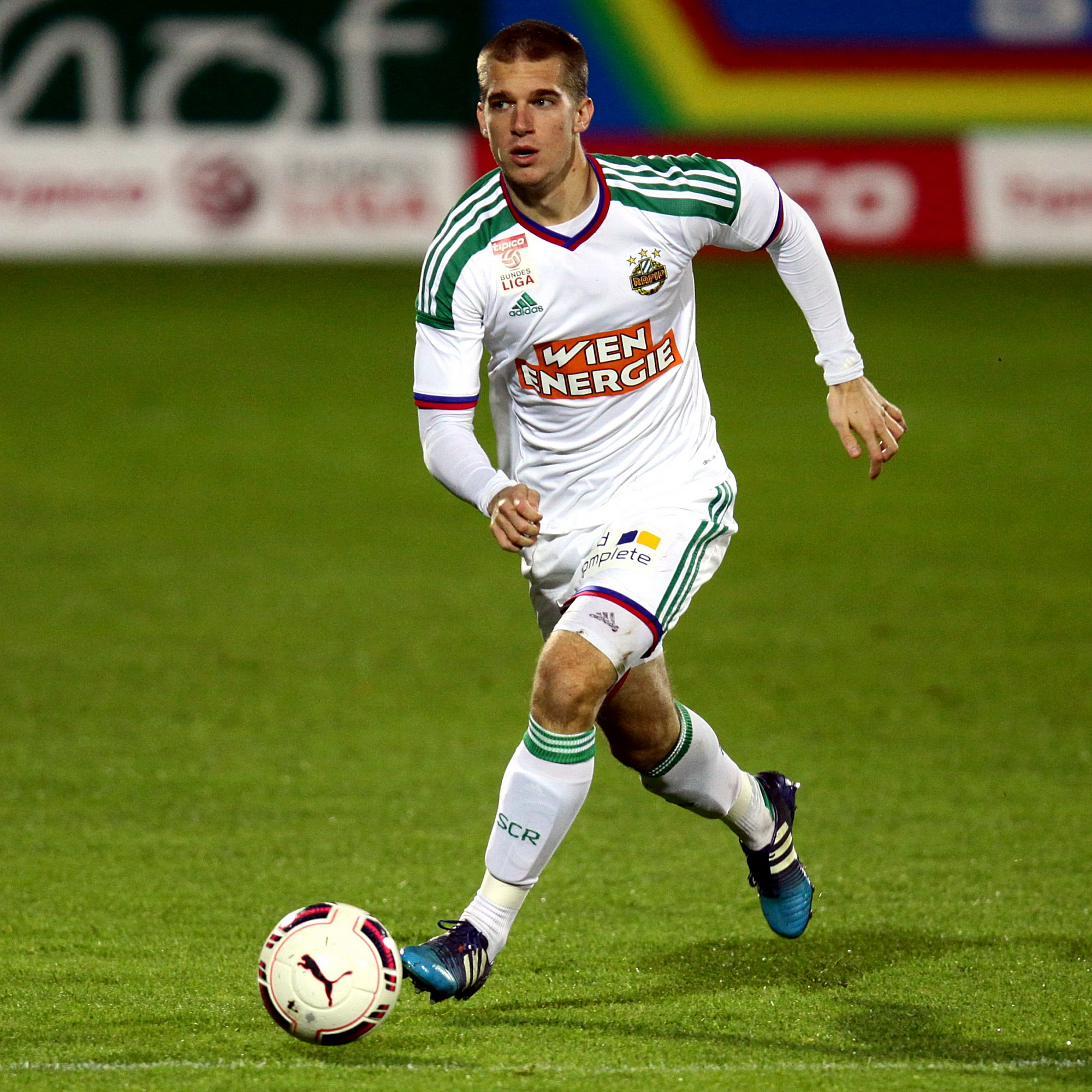
Grahovac playing for Rapid Wien in 2015

In June 2014, Grahovac was transferred to Austrian side Rapid Wien for an undisclosed fee. He made his official debut for the team on 31 August against Grödig. On 29 November 2015, he scored his first goal for Rapid Wien in a defeat of Altach.

In June 2016, he extended his contract with the squad until June 2019.

=== Astana ===
In March 2017, Grahovac was loaned to Kazakh outfit Astana until the end of the season. He made his competitive debut for the side against Shakhter Karagandy on 1 April. On 16 April, he scored his first goal for Astana in a victory over Okzhetpes. He won his first trophy with the club on 5 November, when they were crowned league champions.

In February 2018, after signing permanently with Astana, he was sent on a year-long loan to Croatian team Rijeka.

=== Return to Rapid Wien ===
In January 2019, Grahovac returned to Rapid Wien on a contract until June 2022. He played his first official game for the squad since coming back on 2 March against St. Pölten.

Grahovac played his 100th game for the side against Sturm Graz on 30 May.

On 31 January 2021, he scored his first goal for Rapid Wien after returning against LASK.

=== Later stage of career ===
In July 2022, Grahovac moved to Turkish outfit Rizespor.

In August 2023, he went back to Borac Banja Luka.

== International career ==
Grahovac represented Bosnia and Herzegovina at all youth levels. He also served as a captain of the under-21 team under coach Vlado Jagodić, and is the most capped player in selection's history, having appeared in 23 games.

In September 2015, he received his first senior call up, for UEFA Euro 2016 qualifiers against Wales and Cyprus, but had to wait until 25 March 2016 to make his debut in a friendly match against Luxembourg.

== Career statistics ==
=== Club ===
As of match played 26 May 2026

Appearances and goals by club, season and competition
| Club | Season | League | | | National cup (Note: Includes Bosnian Cup, Austrian Cup, Croatian Cup, Turkish Cup) | | Continental | | Other | | Total | |
| Club | Season | Division | Apps | Goals | Apps | Goals | Apps | Goals | Apps | Goals | Apps | Goals |
|---|---|---|---|---|---|---|---|---|---|---|---|---|
| Borac Banja Luka | 2009–10 | Bosnian Premier League | 10 | 0 | 3 | 0 | – | | – | | 13 | 0 |
| Borac Banja Luka | 2010–11 | Bosnian Premier League | 24 | 1 | 2 | 0 | 0 | 0 | – | | 26 | 1 |
| Borac Banja Luka | 2011–12 | Bosnian Premier League | 26 | 1 | 6 | 0 | 2 (Note: Appearances in UEFA Champions League) | 0 | – | | 34 | 1 |
| Borac Banja Luka | 2012–13 | Bosnian Premier League | 29 | 2 | 1 | 0 | 2 (Note: Appearances in UEFA Europa League) | 1 | – | | 32 | 3 |
| Borac Banja Luka | 2013–14 | Bosnian Premier League | 27 | 2 | 2 | 0 | – | | – | | 29 | 2 |
| Borac Banja Luka | Total | | 116 | 6 | 14 | 0 | 4 | 1 | – | | 134 | 7 |
| Rapid Wien | 2014–15 | Austrian Bundesliga | 13 | 0 | 3 | 0 | 0 | 0 | – | | 16 | 0 |
| Rapid Wien | 2015–16 | Austrian Bundesliga | 26 | 2 | 2 | 0 | 11 (Note: Four appearances in UEFA Champions League; seven appearances in UEFA Europa League) | 0 | – | | 39 | 2 |
| Rapid Wien | 2016–17 | Austrian Bundesliga | 20 | 2 | 2 | 0 | 9 | 0 | – | | 31 | 2 |
| Rapid Wien | Total | | 59 | 4 | 7 | 0 | 20 | 0 | – | | 86 | 4 |
| Astana (loan) | 2017 | Kazakhstan Premier League | 26 | 8 | 0 | 0 | 10 (Note: Six appearances in UEFA Champions League; four appearances in UEFA Europa League) | 0 | – | | 36 | 8 |
| Rijeka (loan) | 2017–18 | Croatian Football League | 14 | 0 | 1 | 0 | – | | – | | 15 | 0 |
| Rijeka (loan) | 2018–19 | Croatian Football League | 12 | 0 | 1 | 0 | 2 | 0 | – | | 15 | 0 |
| Rijeka (loan) | Total | | 26 | 0 | 2 | 0 | 2 | 0 | – | | 30 | 0 |
| Rapid Wien | 2018–19 | Austrian Bundesliga | 8 | 0 | 2 | 0 | 2 | 0 | 3 (Note: Appearances in Austrian Bundesliga play-offs for UEFA Europa League) | 0 | 15 | 0 |
| Rapid Wien | 2019–20 | Austrian Bundesliga | 19 | 0 | 1 | 0 | – | | – | | 20 | 0 |
| Rapid Wien | 2020–21 | Austrian Bundesliga | 27 | 1 | 2 | 0 | 7 (Note: Two appearances in UEFA Champions League; five appearances in UEFA Europa League) | 0 | – | | 36 | 1 |
| Rapid Wien | 2021–22 | Austrian Bundesliga | 23 | 1 | 3 | 2 | 12 (Note: One appearance in UEFA Champions League; nine appearances in UEFA Europa League; two appearances in UEFA Conference League) | 0 | – | | 38 | 3 |
| Rapid Wien | Total | | 77 | 2 | 8 | 2 | 21 | 0 | 3 | 0 | 109 | 4 |
| Rizespor | 2022–23 | 1. Lig | 7 | 0 | 1 | 0 | – | | – | | 8 | 0 |
| Borac Banja Luka | 2023–24 | Bosnian Premier League | 27 | 4 | 6 | 0 | – | | – | | 33 | 4 |
| Borac Banja Luka | 2024–25 | Bosnian Premier League | 16 | 1 | 3 | 0 | 14 (Note: Four appearances in UEFA Champions League; four appearances in UEFA Europa League, six appearances in UEFA Conference League) | 0 | – | | 33 | 1 |
| Borac Banja Luka | 2025–26 | Bosnian Premier League | 27 | 2 | 0 | 0 | 2 (Note: Appearances in UEFA Conference League) | 0 | – | | 29 | 2 |
| Borac Banja Luka | 2026–27 | Bosnian Premier League | 0 | 0 | 0 | 0 | 0 | 0 | 0 | 0 | 0 | 0 |
| Borac Banja Luka | Total | | 70 | 7 | 9 | 0 | 16 | 0 | – | | 95 | 7 |
| Career total | | | 381 | 27 | 41 | 2 | 73 | 1 | 3 | 0 | 498 | 30 |

=== International ===
Appearances and goals by national team and year
| National team | Year | Apps | Goals |
|---|---|---|---|
Bosnia and Herzegovina
| Bosnia and Herzegovina | 2016 | 3 | 0 |
| Total | | 3 | 0 |

== Honours ==
Borac Banja Luka

- Bosnian Premier League: 2010–11, 2023–24, 2025–26
- Bosnian Cup: 2009–10

Astana

- Kazakhstan Premier League: 2017
