= Philipp Prosenik =

Austrian professional footballer

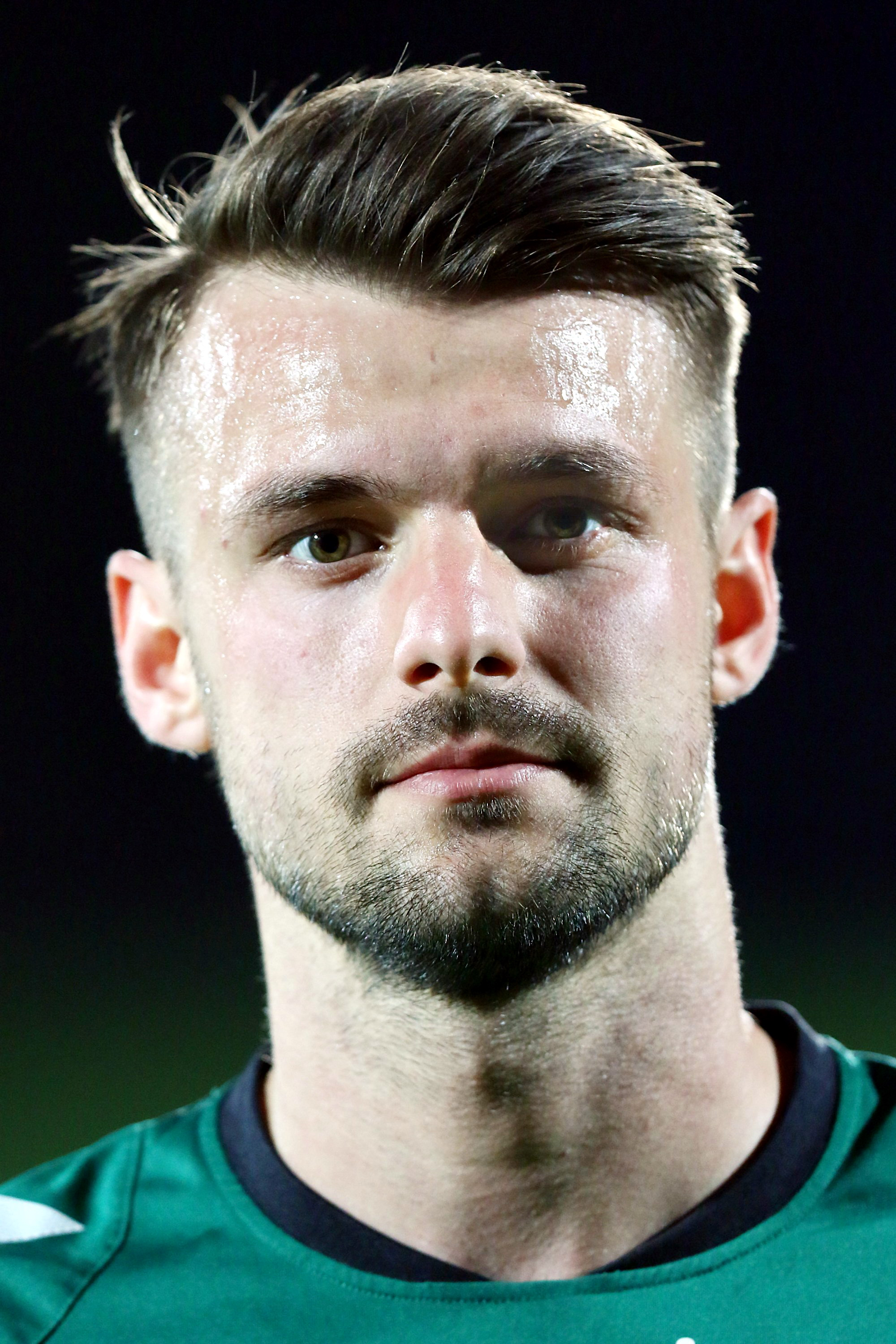

Personal information
- Date of birth: 3 March 1993 (age 33)
- Place of birth: Vienna, Austria
- Height: 1.88 m (6 ft 2 in)
- Position: Forward

Team information
- Current team: SC Himberg
- Number: 8

Youth career
- –2001: 1860 Munich
- 2001–2007: SV Schwechat
- 2007–2009: Rapid Wien
- 2009–2012: Chelsea
- 2012–2013: AC Milan

Senior career*
Years	Team	Apps	(Gls)
2012–2013	AC Milan	0	(0)
2013–2015	Rapid Wien II	32	(16)
2014–2018	Rapid Wien	44	(8)
2016–2017	→ Wolfsberger AC (loan)	33	(7)
2018	SV Ried	13	(1)
2018–2019	SV Mattersburg	9	(0)
2018	SV Mattersburg II	1	(1)
2019	Floridsdorfer AC	11	(0)
2020–2021	ASV Siegendorf	7	(6)
2022–	SC Himberg	24	(10)

International career
2009	Austria U16	2	(3)
2008–2009	Austria U17	18	(10)
2010–2012	Austria U19	8	(0)
2012	Austria U21	3	(0)
- * Club domestic league appearances and goals as of 19:03, 12 March 2023 (UTC)

Philipp Prosenik (born 3 March 1993) is an Austrian professional footballer who plays as a forward for SC Himberg.

== Club career ==
Born in Vienna, Prosenik started playing football with German 1860 Munich where his father was signed at that time. In 2001, he returned to Austria to continue his sport at local SV Schwechat, close to Vienna. Subsequently, he was signed by renowned Rapid Wien, before moving to the youth ranks of English Premier League side Chelsea in 2009. He signed for Italian Serie A club AC Milan in January 2012, joining the youth academy. He was released by AC Milan in July 2013. He returned to Rapid Wien in October 2013, at first only playing in the reserves team. Since the start of the 2014–15 he is also included in the first team's squad.

Prosenik joined SV Ried in January 2018.

== Personal life ==
He is the son of former Austrian international footballer Christian Prosenik.

== Career statistics ==
As of match played 8 March 2020

Appearances and goals by club, season and competition
Club	Season	League			Austrian Cup		Europe		Other		Total	
Club	Season	Division	Apps	Goals	Apps	Goals	Apps	Goals	Apps	Goals	Apps	Goals
Rapid Wien II	2013–14	Austrian Regionalliga East	15	8	—		—		—		15	8
Rapid Wien II	2014–15	Austrian Regionalliga East	11	5	—		—		—		11	5
Rapid Wien II	2015–16	Austrian Regionalliga East	4	2	—		—		—		4	2
Rapid Wien II	2017–18	Austrian Regionalliga East	2	1	—		—		—		2	1
Rapid Wien II	Total		32	16	—		—		—		32	16
Rapid Wien	2014–15	Austrian Bundesliga	17	3	2	1	0	0	—		19	4
Rapid Wien	2015–16	Austrian Bundesliga	22	4	3	1	3 (Note: Appearance(s) in UEFA Champions League)	0	—		28	5
Rapid Wien	2016–17	Austrian Bundesliga	0	0	0	0	0	0	—		0	0
Rapid Wien	2017–18	Austrian Bundesliga	5	1	1	0	—		—		6	1
Rapid Wien	Total		44	8	6	2	3	0	—		53	10
Wolfsberger AC (loan)	2016–17	Austrian Bundesliga	33	7	1	0	—		—		34	7
SV Ried	2017–18	Austrian Second League	13	1	1	0	—		—		14	1
SV Mattersburg	2018–19	Austrian Bundesliga	9	0	0	0	—		—		9	0
SV Mattersburg II	2018–19	Austrian Regionalliga East	1	1	—		—		—		1	1
Floridsdorfer AC	2019–20	Austrian Second League	11	0	2	1	—		—		13	1
Career total			143	33	10	3	3	0	0	0	156	36
