= Dino Kovačec =

Croatian footballer

Personal information
- Date of birth: 27 December 1993 (age 32)
- Place of birth: Zagreb, Croatia
- Height: 1.78 m (5 ft 10 in)
- Position: Midfielder

Team information
- Current team: Varteks

Youth career
- –2010: NK Zagorec Krapina
- 2011–2012: Dinamo Zagreb

Senior career*
Years	Team	Apps	(Gls)
2012	Sesvete	0	(0)
2012–2013	Dubrava		
2013	SV Wildon		
2014	SC Mannsdorf		
2014–2017	Rapid Wien II	77	(17)
2016	Rapid Wien	1	(0)
2017–2020	WSG Swarovski Tirol	54	(3)
2020–2022	SKU Amstetten	41	(1)
2022–	Varteks		
- * Club domestic league appearances and goals as of 26 September 2022

Dino Kovačec (born 27 December 1993) is a Croatian professional footballer who plays for Varteks.

== Club career ==
He made his Austrian Football Bundesliga debut for SK Rapid Wien on 15 May 2016 in a game against FC Admira Wacker Mödling.

On 27 August 2020, he signed with SKU Amstetten.
