= Stefan Stangl =

Austrian footballer (born 1991)

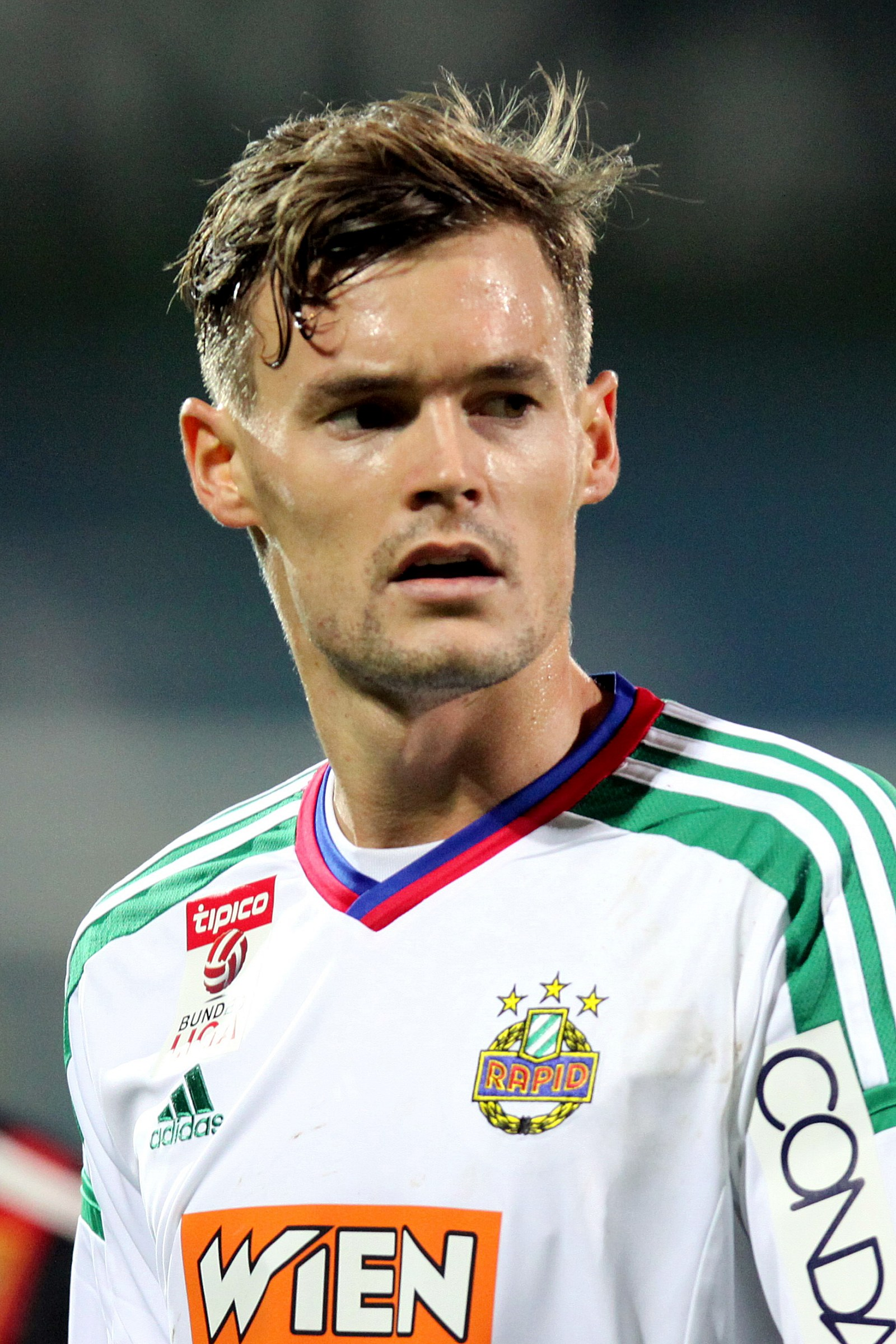
- Stangl in 2015

Personal information
- Date of birth: 20 October 1991 (age 35)
- Place of birth: Wagna, Austria
- Height: 1.85 m (6 ft 1 in)
- Position: Left-back

Youth career
- 2001–2009: Sturm Graz

Senior career*
Years	Team	Apps	(Gls)
2009–2011	Sturm Graz II	66	(7)
2011–2012	Sturm Graz	1	(0)
2012	→ Grödig (loan)	9	(0)
2012–2013	Horn	29	(1)
2013–2014	Wiener Neustadt	28	(0)
2014–2016	Rapid Wien	41	(5)
2016–2018	Red Bull Salzburg	8	(0)
2018	→ Austria Wien (loan)	10	(0)
2019	Slovan Bratislava	1	(0)
2019–2020	St. Pölten	2	(0)
2020–2021	Türkgücü München	16	(0)
2021–2022	Wehen Wiesbaden	5	(0)

International career^{‡}
2016	Austria	1	(0)
- * Club domestic league appearances and goals as of 18 December 2021 ‡ National team caps and goals as of 15 November 2016

Stefan Stangl (born 20 October 1991) is an Austrian professional footballer who plays as a left-back.

== Career ==
Stangl joined Sturm Graz in 2001, and having advanced through the club's youth system made his debut for the second team in a 4–2 defeat by SC Weiz in Regional League Central on 2 June 2009. He made his first-team debut as a late substitute in a Champions League qualifier against FC Zestaponi of Georgia on 26 July 2011. After making three further appearances for Sturm Graz, Stangl was loaned to First League side SV Grödig in January 2012. He left Sturm Graz in the summer of 2012 to join SV Horn, where he established himself as a first-team regular in the First League. He joined SC Wiener Neustadt of the Bundesliga a year later.

In summer 2014, he moved to Rapid Wien signing a contract until 2017. At the occasion of his signing, Rapid's general manager Andreas Müller described him as "strong in the air" and "standing out by his competitive spirit".

On 10 January 2022, Stangl was released from his contract with SV Wehen Wiesbaden by mutual consent.

== International career ==
Stangl was named in Austria's senior squad for a 2018 FIFA World Cup qualifier against Wales in September 2016.
