= Tobias Knoflach =

Austrian footballer

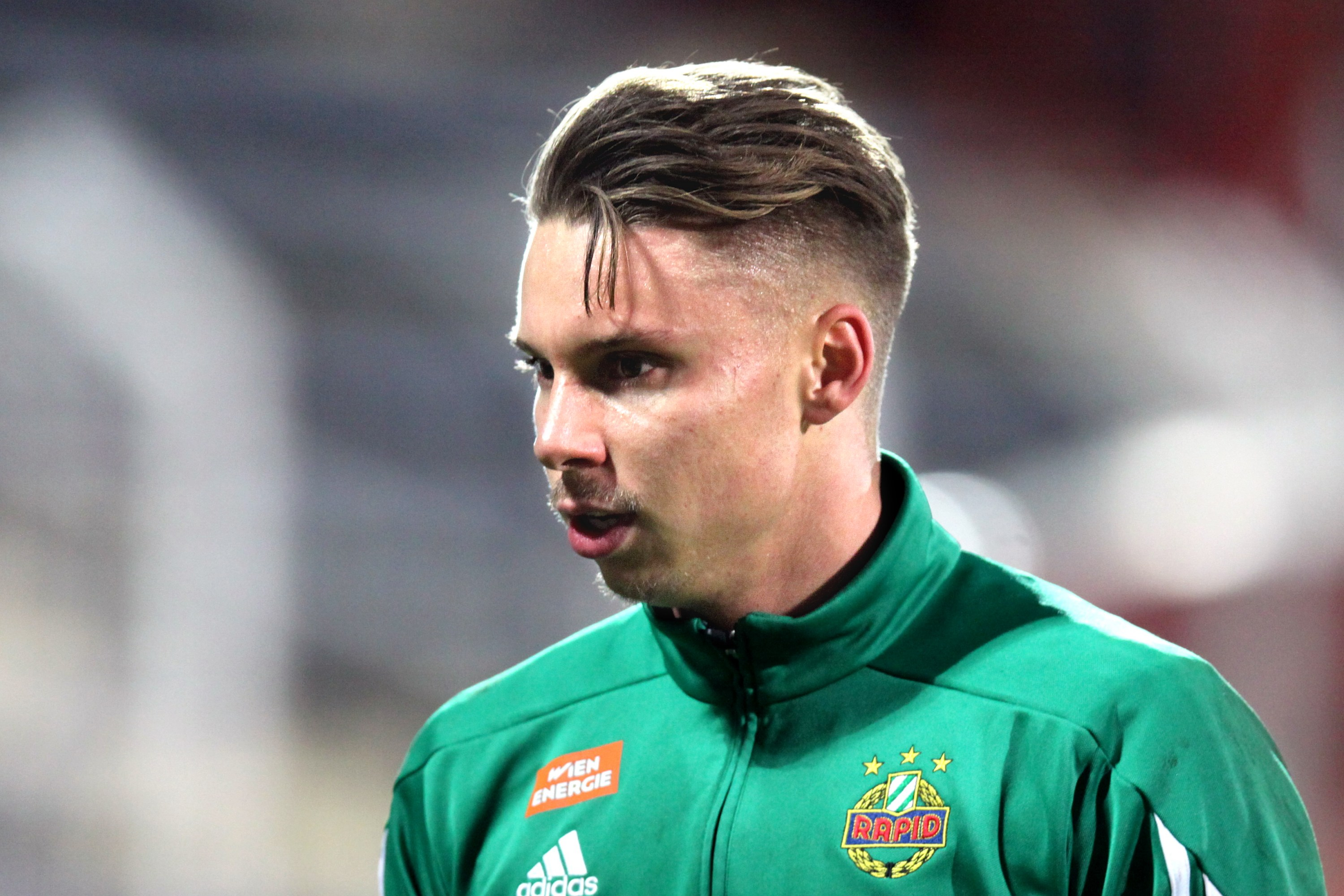

Personal information
- Date of birth: 30 December 1993 (age 32)
- Place of birth: Vienna, Austria
- Height: 1.83 m (6 ft 0 in)
- Position: Goalkeeper

Team information
- Current team: Rapid Wien II
- Number: 99

Senior career*
Years	Team	Apps	(Gls)
2011–2017	SK Rapid Wien II	67	(0)
2012–2020	SK Rapid Wien	33	(0)
2021–2022	Sambenedettese	26	(0)
2022–2023	Politehnica Iași	9	(0)
2023–2024	TSV Hartberg	0	(0)
2025–	Rapid Wien II	1	(0)
- * Club domestic league appearances and goals as of 12 June 2025

Tobias Knoflach (born 30 December 1993) is an Austrian professional footballer who plays for Rapid Wien II.

== Career ==
On 22 October 2021, Knoflach signed for Italian Serie D club Sambenedettese.

In August 2022, he left Sambenedettese to join Romanian Liga II club Politehnica Iași.

On 22 August 2023, Knoflach returned to Austria and signed a one-season contract with TSV Hartberg.

On 15 January 2025, Knoflach joined Rapid Wien II on short-term contract.
