= 2013–14 SK Rapid Wien season =

Rapid Wien
2013–14 season
- President: Rudolf Edlinger (until 18 November 2013); Michael Krammer
- Coach: Zoran Barisic
- Stadium: Gerhard Hanappi Stadium, Vienna, Austria
- Bundesliga: 2nd
- ÖFB-Cup: 1st round
- Europa League: Group stage (3rd)
- Top goalscorer: League: Terrence Boyd (15 goals); All: Terrence Boyd (20 goals)
- Highest home attendance: 17.200 vs. Red Bull Salzburg, 26 April 2014 vs. Wacker Innsbruck, 4 May 2014
- Lowest home attendance: 9.200 vs. SC Wiener Neustadt, 15 December 2013
Home colours	Away colours	Third colours

The 2013–14 SK Rapid Wien season was the 116th season in club history.

== Matches ==
=== Legend ===
Win Draw Loss Postponed

=== Bundesliga ===
==== League results and fixtures ====
20 July 2013 1	Wolfsberger AC	2–2	Rapid Wien	Wolfsberg
19:00 CET	Micic 57'; Dunst (yellow card) 61'; Topcagić (yellow card) 64'; Liendl 89' (pen.)		29' (yellow card) 73' Burgstaller; 37' Schaub; (yellow card) 38' Schrammel; (yellow card) 39' Sabitzer; (yellow card) 89' Pichler	Stadium: Lavanttal-Arena; Attendance: 6.800; Referee: Robert Schörgenhofer

27 July 2013 2	Rapid Wien	4–0	SC Wiener Neustadt	Vienna
16:30 CET	Burgstaller 28' 38'; Boyd 53' 79'		(red card) 16' Mimm	Stadium: Gerhard Hanappi Stadium; Attendance: 11.500; Referee: Dominik Ouschan

4 August 2013 3	Sturm Graz	2–4	Rapid Wien	Graz
16:30 CET	Vujadinovic 3' (pen.) (yellow card) 57'; Kainz T. (yellow card) 46'; Todorovski (yellow card) 51'; Kröpfl (yellow card) 83'; Kainz F. (yellow card) 85'; Beichler 88'; Wolf (yellow card) 90'	Report	(red card) 1' Hofmann M. (yellow card) 35' Sabitzer; (yellow card) 38' (goal) 53' (pen.) Burgstaller; (yellow card) 41' Petsos; 47' Trimmel; 77' Behrendt; 90+3' Schaub	Stadium: UPC-Arena; Attendance: 10.250; Referee: Markus Hameter

11 August 2013 4	Rapid Wien	0–0	Austria Wien	Vienna
16:30 CET	Palla (yellow card) 6' (yellow card) 26' (red card); Burgstaller (yellow card) 26'	Report	(yellow card) 53' Rogulj; (yellow card) 85' Ortlechner	Stadium: Gerhard Hanappi Stadium; Attendance: 16.700; Referee: Harald Lechner

18 August 2013 5	Admira Wacker	2–0	Rapid Wien	Maria Enzersdorf
16:30 CET	Schachner (yellow card) 16'; Ebner (yellow card) 29'; Domoraud 36'; Schick (yellow card) 76'; Schicker 90+2'	Report	(yellow card) 26' Hofmann S. (yellow card) 38' Trimmel; (yellow card) 58' Sabitzer; (yellow card) 89' Pichler	Stadium: BSFZ Arena; Attendance: 7.200; Referee: Alexander Harkam

24 August 2013 6	Rapid Wien	0–1	SV Grödig	Vienna
16:30 CET	Dibon (yellow card) 31'; Petsos (yellow card) 39'; Hofmann S. (yellow card) 50'; Trimmel (yellow card) 55'; Behrendt (yellow card) 76'; Denner (yellow card) 80'	Report	(yellow card) 17' Leitgeb; 24' (yellow card) 88' Karner; (yellow card) 67' Salamon; (yellow card) 75' Zündel; (yellow card) 85' Huspek	Stadium: Gerhard Hanappi Stadium; Attendance: 12.800; Referee: Manuel Schüttengruber

1 September 2013 7	Red Bull Salzburg	1–1	Rapid Wien	Wals-Siezenheim
16:30 CET	Hierländer 43' (yellow card) 76'; Hinteregger (yellow card) 59'; Klein (yellow card) 90'	Report	(yellow card) 22' (goal) 65' Boyd; (yellow card) 34' Petsos; (yellow card) 45' Pichler; (yellow card) 90' Sabitzer	Stadium: Red Bull Arena; Attendance: 16.500; Referee: Dominik Ouschan

14 September 2013 8	Wacker Innsbruck	0–4	Rapid Wien	Innsbruck
16:30 CET	Jaio (red card) 2'; Wallner (yellow card) 34'; Schütz (yellow card) 61'; Kofler (yellow card) 85'	Report	31' Sonnleitner; (yellow card) 48' Boskovic; 55' Boyd; (yellow card) 59' Schrammel; 80' Petsos; 88' Burgstaller	Stadium: Tivoli-Neu; Attendance: 10.650; Referee: Alexander Harkam

22 September 2013 9	Rapid Wien	2–0	SV Ried	Vienna
16:30 CET	Burgstaller 8' (yellow card) 68'; Boyd 17'; Dibon (yellow card) 37'; Petsos (yellow card) 45'	Report	(yellow card) 23' Walch; (yellow card) 90' Riegler	Stadium: Gerhard Hanappi Stadium; Attendance: 11.500; Referee: Robert Schörgenhofer

28 September 2013 10	Rapid Wien	2–4	Wolfsberger AC	Vienna
19:00	Schaub 10'; Petsos 20'; Palla (yellow card) 83'	Report	30' Liendl; 50' Gotal; 56' Topcagić; 70' Rnic; (yellow card) 80' Sollbauer	Stadium: Gerhard Hanappi Stadium; Attendance: 12.200; Referee: Oliver Drachta

6 October 2013 11	SC Wiener Neustadt	0–0	Rapid Wien	Wiener Neustadt
19:00		Report	(yellow card) 34' Schaub; (yellow card) 45' Dibon; (yellow card) 85' Pichler	Stadium: Stadion Wiener Neustadt; Attendance: 3.800; Referee: Andreas Kollegger

20 October 2013 12	Rapid Wien	2–2	Sturm Graz	Vienna
16:30	Dibon (yellow card) 14'; Trimmel (yellow card) 27'; Hofmann (yellow card) 27' (goal) 53' (pen.); Petsos (yellow card) 30'; Boyd 64' (pen.)	Report	12' 26' (yellow card) 51' Beric; (yellow card) 27' Offenbacher; (yellow card) 40' Vujadinovic; (yellow card) 82' Schloffer	Stadium: Gerhard Hanappi Stadium; Attendance: 15.400; Referee: Manuel Schüttengruber

27 October 2013 13	Austria Wien	0–1	Rapid Wien	Vienna
16:30	Rogulj (yellow card) 77'	Report	(yellow card) 17' (goal) 88' Boyd; (yellow card) 39' Sabitzer	Stadium: Generali Arena; Attendance: 11.500; Referee: Gerhard Grobelnik

2 November 2013 14	Rapid Wien	4–2	Admira Wacker	Vienna
16:30	Hofmann S. 24' 35' (pen.); Dibon (red card) 47'; Schaub (yellow card) 66'; Burgstaller 68'; Boskovic 90'	Report	12' 40' Schicker; (yellow card) 29' Ebner; (yellow card) 35' Auer; (yellow card) 64' Ouedraogo; (yellow card) 74' Schick	Stadium: Gerhard Hanappi Stadium; Attendance: 12.700; Referee: Rene Eisner

10 November 2013 15	SV Grödig	2–2	Rapid Wien	Grödig
16:30	Tomi 14'; Zulechner 66'	Report	74' Starkl; (yellow card) 69' Pichler; (yellow card) 71' Trimmel; 85' (pen.) Hofmann S.	Stadium: Untersberg-Arena; Attendance: 3.256; Referee: Robert Schörgenhofer

24 November 2013 16	Rapid Wien	2–1	Red Bull Salzburg	Vienna
16:30	Trimmel (yellow card) 24' (goal) 30'; Schrammel (yellow card) 38'; Behrendt (yellow card) 43'; Sabitzer 74'; Wydra (yellow card) 88'; Burgstaller (yellow card) 90'	Report	18' (yellow card) 73' Alan; (yellow card) 22' Schwegler	Stadium: Gerhard Hanappi Stadium; Attendance: 15.800; Referee: Markus Hameter

1 December 2013 17	Rapid Wien	3–0	Wacker Innsbruck	Vienna
19:00	Starkl 29'; Wydra 90+1' (yellow card) 90+1'; Sonnleitner 90+3'	Report	(yellow card) 1' (yellow card) 53' (red card) Kofler; (yellow card) 77' Siller	Stadium: Gerhard Hanappi Stadium; Attendance: 10.500; Referee: Dominik Ouschan

4 December 2013 18	SV Ried	2–0	Rapid Wien	Ried
20:30	Baumgartner (yellow card) 26'; Zulj 39'; Schicker 74'; Möschl (yellow card) 26'	Report	(yellow card) 73' Petsos; (yellow card) 90+1' Trimmel	Stadium: Keine Sorgen Arena; Attendance: 4.100; Referee: Alexander Harkam

8 December 2013 19	Wolfsberger AC	2–1	Rapid Wien	Wolfsberg
16:30	Baldauf (yellow card) 59'; Topcagić 61'; Liendl 74'	Report	51' Guido Burgstaller	Stadium: Lavanttal-Arena; Attendance: 4.100; Referee: Rene Eisner

15 December 2013 20	Rapid Wien	0–0	SC Wiener Neustadt	Vienna
19:00	Petsos (yellow card) 17'; Burgstaller (yellow card) 38'	Report	(yellow card) 29' Freitag; (yellow card) 52' Stangl; (yellow card) 90' Säumel	Stadium: Gerhard Hanappi Stadium; Attendance: 9.200; Referee: Oliver Drachta

18 December 2013 21	Sturm Graz	2–0	Rapid Wien	Graz
20:30	Weber (yellow card) 20'; Dibon 53' (o.g.); Madl (yellow card) 73'; Dudic (red card) 73'; Offenbacher (yellow card) 78'; Schmerböck 83'; Vujadinovic (yellow card) 90'; Djuricin (yellow card) 90'	Report	(yellow card) 11' Behrendt; (yellow card) 70' Dibon; (red card) 73' Boyd; (yellow card) 85' Wydra	Stadium: UPC-Arena; Attendance: 3.600; Referee: Markus Hameter

9 February 2014 22	Rapid Wien	3–1	Austria Wien	Vienna
16:30	Trimmel (yellow card) 23'; Rogulj 36' (o.g.); Hofmann S. (yellow card) 77'; Sabitzer 79'; Sonnleitner 84'	Report	(yellow card) 1' Ortlechner; 26' De Paula; (yellow card) 45' Holland	Stadium: Gerhard Hanappi Stadium; Attendance: 17.000; Referee: Oliver Drachta

16 February 2014 23	Admira Wacker	2–1	Rapid Wien	Maria Enzersdorf
17:00	Sulimani 79' 90'; Domoraud (yellow card) 80'	Report	(red card) 67' Bošković; (yellow card) 67' Hofmann S. (yellow card) 90+2' Wydra; 90+3' Boyd	Stadium: BSFZ-Arena; Attendance: 5,460; Referee: Dieter Muckenhammer

22 February 2014 24	Rapid Wien	0–0	SV Grödig	Vienna
19:00		Report		Stadium: Gerhard Hanappi Stadium; Attendance: 11.200; Referee: Rene Eisner

2 March 2014 25	Red Bull Salzburg	6–3	Rapid Wien	Wals-Siezenheim
16:30	Soriano 10' 84' 90+5'; Ilsanker 41'; Sonnleitner 58' (o.g.); Walke (yellow card) 66'; Hinteregger (yellow card) 78'; Kampl 89'	Report	45+4' (yellow card) 62' Boyd; (yellow card) 52' Behrendt; 56' Petsos; (yellow card) 60' (goal) 66' Trimmel	Stadium: Red Bull Arena; Attendance: 17.600; Referee: Alexander Harkam

9 March 2014 26	Wacker Innsbruck	1–1	Rapid Wien	Innsbruck
16:30	Hinterseer 18'; Schütz (yellow card) 31'; Vučur (yellow card) 65'; Đokić (yellow card) 65'; Ji-Paraná (yellow card) 90+1'	Report	(yellow card) 27' Sonnleitner; 88' Alar	Stadium: Tivoli-Neu; Attendance: 6.200; Referee: Robert Schörgenhofer

15 March 2014 27	Rapid Wien	1–0	SV Ried	Vienna
19:00	Behrendt (yellow card) 30'; Burgstaller (yellow card) 66'; Sabitzer 75'; Wydra (yellow card) 82'	Report	(yellow card) 30' Kragl; (yellow card) 38' Gebauer; (yellow card) 58' Reifeltshammer; (yellow card) 60' Pichler	Stadium: Gerhard Hanappi Stadium; Attendance: 10.200; Referee: Markus Hameter

22 March 2014 28	Rapid Wien	3–0	Wolfsberger AC	Vienna
19:00	Alar 21' (pen.) (yellow card) 34'; Petsos (yellow card) 55'; Sabitzer 83'; Rnić 87' (o.g.)	Report	(yellow card) 65' Rnić; (yellow card) 72' Žulj; (yellow card) 82' Hüttenbrenner; (yellow card) 85' Standfest	Stadium: Gerhard Hanappi Stadium; Attendance: 13.100; Referee: Manuel Schüttengruber

26 March 2014 29	SC Wiener Neustadt	0–3	Rapid Wien	Wiener Neustadt
20:30	Säumel (yellow card) 58'; Mimm (yellow card) 69' (yellow card) 84' (red card)	Report	17' Sabitzer; (yellow card) 82' Schimpelsberger; 86' 90+2' Boskovic; (yellow card) 90' Burgstaller	Stadium: Stadion Wiener Neustadt; Attendance: 3.450; Referee: Robert Schörgenhofer

29 March 2014 30	Rapid Wien	2–0	Sturm Graz	Vienna
16:30	Hofmann S. 7'; Sonnleitner 9'; Behrendt (yellow card) 41'; Petsos (yellow card) 80'; Boyd (yellow card) 81'	Report	(yellow card) 38' Hölzl; (yellow card) 78' Beichler; (yellow card) 78' Djuricin; (yellow card) 90' Madl	Stadium: Gerhard Hanappi Stadium; Attendance: 15.700; Referee: Oliver Drachta

6 April 2014 31	Austria Wien	0–1	Rapid Wien	Vienna
15:00	Ortlechner (yellow card) 31'; Rotpuller (yellow card) 73'; Ramsebner (yellow card) 86'	Report	66' Sabitzer; (yellow card) 77' (yellow card) 87' (red card) Burgstaller	Stadium: Generali Arena; Attendance: 12.500; Referee: Harald Lechner

12 April 2014 32	Rapid Wien	0–0	Admira Wacker	Vienna
19:00		Report		Stadium: Gerhard Hanappi Stadium; Attendance: 15.500; Referee: Alexander Harkam

20 April 2014 33	SV Grödig	2–2	Rapid Wien	Grödig
16:30	Trdina 12' 51'; Cabrera (yellow card) 34'; Fend (yellow card) 42'; Maak (yellow card) 70'; Sigurðsson (yellow card) 90'	Report	24' 44' (pen.) Boyd; (yellow card) 36' Trimmel; (yellow card) 45' Wydra; (yellow card) 75' Sabitzer	Stadium: Untersberg-Arena; Attendance: 2.749; Referee: Manuel Schüttengruber

26 April 2014 34	Rapid Wien	2–1	Red Bull Salzburg	Vienna
19:00	Boyd 15' 84'; Trimmel (yellow card) 8'; Hofmann S. (yellow card) 63'; Sabitzer (yellow card) 65'; Behrendt (yellow card) 70'	Report	(yellow card) 1' (goal) 68' Alan	Stadium: Gerhard Hanappi Stadium; Attendance: 17.200; Referee: Dieter Muckenhammer

4 May 2014 35	Rapid Wien	2–0	Wacker Innsbruck	Vienna
16:30	Boyd 34'; Sabitzer 83'; Schimpelsberger (yellow card) 90'	Report	(yellow card) 36' Edomwonyi; (yellow card) 59' Milosevic; (yellow card) 70' Hauser	Stadium: Gerhard Hanappi Stadium; Attendance: 17.200; Referee: Dominik Ouschan

11 May 2014 36	SV Ried	2–5	Rapid Wien	Ried
16:30	Gartler (yellow card) 2'; Pavelić 29' (o.g.); Möschl (yellow card) 39'; Kragl (yellow card) 67' (goal) 86'; Trauner (yellow card) 87'	Report	12' 54' 84' Burgstaller; (yellow card) 24' Hofmann S. 70' Boyd; 90' Trimmel	Stadium: Keine Sorgen Arena; Attendance: 5.400; Referee: Markus Hameter

==== League table ====
===== Overall league table =====
Pos	Team	Pld	W	D	L	GF	GA	GD	Pts	Qualification or relegation
1	Red Bull Salzburg (C)	36	25	5	6	110	35	+75	80	Qualification for the Champions League third qualifying round
2	Rapid Wien	36	17	11	8	63	40	+23	62	Qualification for the Europa League play-off round
3	Grödig	36	15	9	12	68	71	−3	54	Qualification for the Europa League second qualifying round
4	Austria Wien	36	14	11	11	58	44	+14	53	
5	Sturm Graz	36	13	9	14	55	55	0	48	

Source: weltfussball.de (in German)
Rules for classification: 1) points; 2) goal difference; 3) number of goals scored.
(C) Champions

===== Summary table =====
Overall								Home						Away					
Pld	W	D	L	GF	GA	GD	Pts	W	D	L	GF	GA	GD	W	D	L	GF	GA	GD
36	17	11	8	62	39	+23	62	11	5	2	32	12	+20	6	6	6	30	27	+3

Last updated: 20 May 2014.
Source: Bundesliga.at (Home) and Bundesliga.at (Away)

=== ÖFB-Cup ===
14 July 2013 1st Round	LASK Linz	0–0 (a.e.t.) (5–4 p)	Rapid Wien	Linz
18:00	Stadlbauer (yellow card) 73'	Report	(yellow card) 46' Wydra; (yellow card) 96' Burgstaller	Stadium: Linzer Stadion; Attendance: 6.200; Referee: Alexander Harkam
	Penalties
	Klapf (penalty scored); Takougnadi (penalty scored); Templ (penalty scored); Stadlbauer (penalty scored); Barry (penalty scored)		(penalty scored) Behrendt; (penalty scored) Schrammel; (penalty scored) Pichler; (penalty scored) Boyd; (penalty missed) Sabitzer

=== UEFA Europa League ===
==== Third qualifying round ====
1 August 2013 1st Leg	Asteras Tripolis (Greece)	1–1	Rapid Wien	Tripoli
20:30 CET	Pipinis (yellow card) 17'; Zaradoukas (yellow card) 21'; Zisopoulos 27'; Tsabouris (yellow card) 31'; Kourbelis (yellow card) 34'; Grazzini (yellow card) 90'	Report	(yellow card) 13' Behrendt; 32' (pen.) Boyd; (yellow card) 90+1' Burgstaller	Stadium: Theodoros Kolokotronis Stadium; Attendance: 3.953; Referee: Kevin Blom (Netherlands)

8 August 2013 2nd Leg	Rapid Wien	3–1 (4–2 agg.)	Asteras Tripolis (Greece)	Vienna
20:30 CET	Petsos 26'; Schaub 62' 85'; Hofmann S. (yellow card) 67'; Boyd (yellow card) 71'; Trimmel (yellow card) 75'; Schrammel (yellow card) 88'	Report	57' Grazzini	Stadium: Gerhard Hanappi Stadium; Attendance: 15.300; Referee: Simon Lee Evans (Wales)

==== Play-off round ====
22 August 2013 1st Leg	Rapid Wien	1–0	Dila Gori (Georgia (country))	Vienna
21:05 CET	Schaub 42' (yellow card) 90'; Hofmann S. (yellow card) 56'	Report	(yellow card) 48' Iluridze; (yellow card) 83' Gvalia; (yellow card) 90+2' Kobakhidze	Stadium: Gerhard Hanappi Stadium; Attendance: 14.400; Referee: Stefan Johannesson (Sweden)

29 August 2013 2nd Leg	Dila Gori (Georgia (country))	0–3 (0–4 agg.)	Rapid Wien	Tbilisi
18:00 CET	Tomashvili (yellow card) 8'; Gongadze (yellow card) 24'; Revishvili (yellow card) 49'; Kobakhidze (yellow card) 82'; Gorelishvili (yellow card) 90+2'; Modebadze (yellow card) 90+2'	Report	45+1' Schaub; (yellow card) 62' Dibon; 63' Sabitzer; 90' Behrendt; (yellow card) 90+2' Novota	Stadium: Mikheil Meskhi Stadium; Attendance: 24.000; Referee: Cristian Balaj (Romania)

==== Group stage ====
===== Group results =====
19 September 2013 1	FC Thun (Switzerland)	1–0	Rapid Wien	Thun
21:05 CET	Hediger (yellow card) 30'; Schneuwly C. 35' (yellow card) 62'	Report	(yellow card) 88' Grozurek; (yellow card) 90+1' Sonnleitner	Stadium: Arena Thun; Attendance: 7.022; Referee: Anastassios Kakos (Greece)

3 October 2013 2	Rapid Wien	2–2	Dynamo Kyiv (Ukraine)	Vienna
19:00 CET	Sonnleitner (yellow card) 40'; Behrendt (yellow card) 43'; Boyd (yellow card) 52'; Burgstaller 53'; Schaub (yellow card) 77'; Trimmel 90+4'	Report	(yellow card) 4' Sydorchuk; 30' Yarmolenko; 34' (o.g.) Dibon; (yellow card) 84' Vukojević; (yellow card) 90+1' Koval	Stadium: Ernst-Happel-Stadion; Attendance: 34.800; Referee: Michael Dean (England)

24 October 2013 3	KRC Genk (Belgium)	1–1	Rapid Wien	Genk
19:00 CET	Gorius 21'; Kumordzi (yellow card) 44'; Vossen (yellow card) 83'	Report	(yellow card) 50' Trimmel; (yellow card) 73' Hofmann S. 82' Sabitzer	Stadium: Cristal Arena; Attendance: 15.000; Referee: Antony Gautier (France)

7 November 2013 4	Rapid Wien	2–2	KRC Genk (Belgium)	Vienna
21:05 CET	Novota (yellow card) 27'; Boyd 40' 45+2'; Hofmann S. (yellow card) 80'; Burgstaller (yellow card) 90+3'	Report	28' (pen.) Kara; 60' Buffel	Stadium: Ernst-Happel-Stadion; Attendance: 34.300; Referee: Fırat Aydınus (Turkey)

28 November 2013 5	Rapid Wien	2–1	FC Thun (Switzerland)	Vienna
19:00 CET	Boyd 17'; Bošković 64'; Starkl (yellow card) 87'	Report	(yellow card) 37' Lüthi; (yellow card) 55' Zuffi; 62' Sadik; (yellow card) 90+3' Sulmoni	Stadium: Ernst-Happel-Stadion; Attendance: 34.300; Referee: Pawel Gil (Poland)

12 December 2013 6	Dynamo Kyiv (Ukraine)	3–1	Rapid Wien	Kyiv
21:05 CET	Lens 22'; Gusev 28'; Veloso 70'; Yarmolenko (yellow card) 76'	Report	6' (yellow card) 56' Boyd; (yellow card) 33' Trimmel	Stadium: NSC Olimpiyskiy; Referee: Björn Kuipers (Netherlands)

===== Group table =====
Pos	Team	Pld	W	D	L	GF	GA	GD	Pts	Qualification	GEN	DYN	RAP	THU
1	(Belgium) Genk	6	4	2	0	10	5	+5	14	Advance to knockout phase	—	3–1	1–1	2–1
2	(Ukraine) Dynamo Kyiv	6	3	1	2	11	7	+4	10	Advance to knockout phase	0–1	—	3–1	3–0
3	(Austria) Rapid Wien	6	1	3	2	8	10	−2	6		2–2	2–2	—	2–1
4	(Switzerland) Thun	6	1	0	5	3	10	−7	3		0–1	0–2	1–0	—

Source: Soccerway

== Squad ==
=== Squad, appearances and goals ===
Squad Season 2013–2014
No.	Player	Nat.	Birthdate	at SCR since	previous club	total matches	total goals	BL matches	BL goals	Cup matches	Cup goals	EL matches	EL goals
Goalkeepers
1	Jan Novota	(Slovakia)	29 November 1983	2011	Dunajska Streda	45	0	34	0	1	0	10	0
23	Samuel Radlinger	(Austria)	7 November 1992	2013	Hannover 96	1	0	1	0	0	0	0	0
29	Marko Marić	(Croatia)	3 January 1996	2012	Junior Team	1	0	1	0	0	0	0	0
31	Lukas Königshofer	(Austria)	16 March 1989	2009	Austria Kärnten	0	0	0	0	0	0	0	0
Defenders
3	Brian Behrendt	(Germany)	24 October 1991	2013	Junior Team	28(13)	2	25(5)	1	0(1)	0	3(7)	1
4	Thomas Schrammel	(Austria)	5 September 1987	2011	SV Ried	35(4)	0	26(3)	0	1	0	8(1)	0
6	Mario Sonnleitner	(Austria)	8 October 1986	2011	Sturm Graz	44	4	32	4	1	0	10	0
16	Stephan Palla	(Philippines)	15 May 1989	2008	Junior Team	9(1)	0	7	0	0	0	2(1)	0
17	Christopher Dibon	(Austria)	2 November 1990	2013	Red Bull Salzburg	36	0	26	0	1	0	9	0
19	Lukas Denner	(Austria)	19 June 1991	2013	Junior Team	2(2)	0	2(1)	0	0	0	0(1)	0
20	Maximilian Hofmann	(Austria)	7 August 1993	2013	Junior Team	4(2)	0	4(1)	0	0	0	0(1)	0
22	Mario Pavelic	(Austria)	19 September 1993	2013	Junior Team	5(6)	0	5(5)	0	0	0	0(1)	0
27	Harald Pichler	(Austria)	19 June 1987	2011	Wacker Innsbruck	7(6)	0	6(5)	0	0(1)	0	1	0
28	Christopher Trimmel (VC)	(Austria)	24 February 1987	2009	Junior Team	42(3)	5	30(3)	4	1	0	10	1
36	Michael Schimpelsberger	(Austria)	12 February 1991	2010	FC Twente	3	0	3	0	0	0	0	0
Midfielders
5	Thanos Petsos	(Greece)	5 June 1991	2013	Greuther Fürth	34(3)	4	24(3)	3	0	0	10	1
10/21	Louis Schaub	(Austria)	29 December 1994	2012	Junior Team	33(12)	7	25(9)	3	1	0	7(3)	4
11	Steffen Hofmann (C)	(Germany)	9 September 1980	2006	1860 München	38(3)	5	29(3)	4	0	0	9	0
18	Eldis Bajrami	(Austria)	12 December 1992	2013	Junior Team	0(1)	0	0(1)	0	0	0	0	0
24	Marcel Sabitzer	(Austria)	7 March 1994	2013	Admira Wacker	35(5)	9	26(3)	7	1	0	8(2)	2
25	Dominik Wydra	(Austria)	21 March 1994	2011	Junior Team	13(8)	1	12(8)	1	1	0	0	0
26	Lukas Grozurek	(Austria)	22 December 1991	2011	Junior Team	8(21)	0	6(16)	0	1	0	1(5)	0
30	Guido Burgstaller	(Austria)	29 April 1989	2011	SC Wiener Neustadt	34(6)	12	25(5)	11	1	0	8(1)	1
32	Branko Bošković	(Montenegro)	21 June 1980	2013	D.C. United	19(8)	4	11(8)	3	1	0	7	1
Forwards
9	Terrence Boyd	(United States)	16 February 1991	2012	Borussia Dortmund II	30(8)	20	23(6)	15	0(1)	0	7(1)	5
33	Deni Alar	(Austria)	18 January 1990	2011	SV Kapfenberg	4(8)	2	4(8)	2	0	0	0	0
34	Dominik Starkl	(Austria)	6 November 1993	2012	Junior Team	6(15)	2	6(11)	2	0	0	0(4)	0
Last updated: 11 May 2014
Note: Numbers in parentheses denotes substitution appearances

=== Goal scorers ===
Rank	Name	Bundesliga	Europa League	Total
1	(United States) Terrence Boyd	15	5	20
2	(Austria) Guido Burgstaller	11	1	12
3	(Austria) Marcel Sabitzer	7	2	9
4	(Austria) Louis Schaub	3	4	7
5	(Germany) Steffen Hofmann	5		5
5	(Austria) Christopher Trimmel	4	1	5
7	(Montenegro) Branko Boskovic	3	1	4
7	(Greece) Thanos Petsos	3	1	4
7	(Austria) Mario Sonnleitner	4		4
10	(Austria) Deni Alar	2		2
10	(Germany) Brian Behrendt	1	1	2
10	(Austria) Dominik Starkl	2		2
13	(Austria) Dominik Wydra	1		1
OG	(Croatia) Kaja Rogulj (Austria)	1		1
OG	(Serbia) Nemanja Rnic (Wolfsberg)	1		1
Totals		63	16	79

=== Transfers ===
==== Summer ====
In:

Out:

No.	Pos.	Nation	Player
3	DF	GER	Brian Behrendt (loan return from SV Horn)
16	DF	PHI	Stephan Palla (loan return from Admira Wacker)
17	DF	AUT	Christopher Dibon (on loan from Red Bull Salzburg)
23	GK	AUT	Samuel Radlinger (on loan from Hannover 96)
5	MF	GRE	Thanos Petsos (from Greuther Fürth)

No.	Pos.	Nation	Player
7	MF	AUT	Stefan Kulovits (to SV Sandhausen)
8	MF	FIN	Markus Heikkinen (to IK Start)
14	DF	AUT	Markus Katzer (to Admira Wacker Mödling)
23	MF	AUT	Thomas Prager (to SC Wiener Viktoria)
35	DF	BRA	Gerson (to Ferencvárosi TC)

==== Winter ====
In:

Out:

No.	Pos.	Nation	Player

No.	Pos.	Nation	Player
27	DF	AUT	Harald Pichler (to SV Ried)
19	DF	AUT	Lukas Denner (on loan to SC Wiener Neustadt)
