= 2014–15 SK Rapid Wien season =

Rapid Wien
2014–15 season
- President: Michael Krammer
- Head Coach: Zoran Barisic
- Stadium: Ernst Happel Stadium, Vienna, Austria
- Bundesliga: 2nd
- Austrian Cup: Quarter-finals
- Europa League: Play-off round
- Top goalscorer: League: Robert Beric (27 goals); All: Robert Beric (27 goals)
- Highest home attendance: 29,800 vs. Austria Wien, 15 May 2015
- Lowest home attendance: 7,800 vs. Sturm Graz, 29 October 2014
- Average home league attendance: 16,934
Home colours	Away colours	Third colours

The 2014–15 SK Rapid Wien season was the 117th season in club history.

== Background ==
=== Background information ===
Rapid Wien finished the 2013–14 season in second place. Normally, the second place team would have entered the second qualifying round. However, Red Bull Salzburg, who qualified for the 2014–15 Champions League, won the 2013–14 Austrian Cup. Therefore Rapid Wien will start in the Play–off round.

In June 2014 it was announced that the new Allianz Stadion will be built in place of Gerhard Hanappi Stadium. Therefore, Rapid hosts its home games in the Ernst Happel Stadion this season and the pre-season game against Celtic F.C. was the last game ever played in the Gerhard Hanappi Stadium.

=== Transfers and contracts ===
==== In ====
No.	Pos.	Name	Age	Moved from	Type	Transfer Window	Contract ends	Transfer fee	Ref.
7	MF	(Austria) Philipp Schobesberger	20	(Austria) FC Pasching	End of contract	Summer	2017	Free	
17	DF	(Austria) Christopher Dibon	23	(Austria) Red Bull Salzburg	Transfer	Summer	2017	Undisclosed	
8	MF	(Austria) Stefan Schwab	23	(Austria) Admira Wacker	Transfer	Summer	2017	Undisclosed	
27	MF	(Austria) Andreas Kuen	19	(Austria) Wacker Innsbruck	Transfer	Summer	2018	Undisclosed	
23	DF	(Austria) Stefan Stangl	22	(Austria) SC Wiener Neustadt	Transfer	Summer	2017	Undisclosed	
15	MF	(Bosnia and Herzegovina) Srđan Grahovac	21	(Bosnia and Herzegovina) Borac Banja Luka	Transfer	Summer	2017	€100,000	
9	FW	(Slovenia) Robert Berić	23	(Austria) Sturm Graz	Transfer	Summer	2018	€750,000	
14	MF	(Austria) Florian Kainz	21	(Austria) Sturm Graz	Transfer	Summer	2017	€400,000	

==== Out ====
No.	Pos.	Name	Age	Moved to	Type	Transfer Window	Transfer fee	Ref.
23	GK	(Austria) Samuel Radlinger	21	(Germany) Hannover 96	Loan Return	Summer		
28	DF	(Austria) Christopher Trimmel	27	(Germany) Union Berlin	End of contract	Summer	Free	
16	DF	(Austria) Stephan Palla	25	(Austria) Wolfsberger AC	End of contract	Summer	Free	
31	GK	(Austria) Lukas Königshofer	25	(Germany) Hallescher FC	End of contract	Summer	Free	
30	MF	(Austria) Guido Burgstaller	25	(Wales) Cardiff City	Transfer	Summer	Undisclosed	
24	FW	(Austria) Marcel Sabitzer	20	(Germany) RB Leipzig	Transfer	Summer	€2,000,000	
9	FW	(United States) Terrence Boyd	23	(Germany) RB Leipzig	Transfer	Summer	€2,000,000	
26	MF	(Austria) Lukas Grozurek	23	(Austria) Admira Wacker	Transfer	Winter	Free	

== Pre-season and friendlies ==
Date	Opponent	Venue	Result F–A	Goalscorers and disciplined players		Attendance	Ref.
Date	Opponent	Venue	Result F–A	Rapid Wien	Opponent	Attendance	Ref.
26 June 2014	Universitatea Cluj	N	4–0	Schaub 16', 21', Alar 47', Schobesberger 82'		500	
6 July 2014	Celtic	H	1–1	van Dijk 9'(o.g.)	Pukki 72'	17,400	
23 July 2014	Galatasaray S.K.	H	3–1	Wydra 28', Behrendt 52', Alar 90'	Chedjou 27'	11,400	
13 November 2014	SV Horn	A	4–2	Beric 14', Alar 35', Grozurek 39', Sonnleitner 88'	Nacho 56', Grubek 69'	500	
24 January 2015	Schalke 04	H	2–1	Schobesberger 48', Alar 82'	Fuchs 27'	9,700	
31 January 2015	CSKA Sofia	N	2–1	Alar 9', Starkl 84'	Milisavljević 37'		
3 February 2015	Bohemians Prague	N	2–2	Starkl 54', Schaub 83'	Jarolím 45', 57'(pen.)	100	
8 February 2015	České Budějovice	H	2–0	Kainz 30', Schwab 62'(pen.)		120	

== Bundesliga ==
=== Bundesliga fixtures and results ===
Win Draw Loss

MD	Date – KO	Opponent	Venue	Result F–A	Attendance	Goalscorers and disciplined players		Table			Ref.
MD	Date – KO	Opponent	Venue	Result F–A	Attendance	Rapid Wien	Opponent	Pos.	Pts.	GD	Ref.
1	19 July 2014 16:30	Red Bull Salzburg	A	1–6	19,800	Hofmann S. 90+2' (pen.)	Ulmer 30'; Alan 40'; Mané 69'; Soriano 77' 79'; Kampl 84'	10th	0	−5	
2	26 July 2014 19:00	Ried	H	1–0	14,200	Alar 65'		7th	3	−4	
3	2 August 2014 16:30	Admira Wacker	A	1–1	6,125	Kainz 63'	Schick 7'; Windbichler (yellow card) 54' (red card)	6th	4	−4	
4	9 August 2014 19:00	Sturm Graz	H	1–1	16,800	Beric 49' (red card) 76'	Offenbacher (yellow card) 31' (red card); Djuricin 82'	4th	5	−4	
5	16 August 2014 16:30	SCR Altach	H	0–1	13,800		Ngwat-Mahop 70'	7th	5	−5	
6	24 August 2014 16:30	Austria Wien	A	2–2	11,900	Beric 35'; Schwab 85'	Gorgon 1'; Damari 63' (pen.)	5th	6	−5	
7	31 August 2014 16:30	Grödig	H	2–0	12,100	Schrammel 14'; Hofmann S. 61'		3rd	9	−3	
8	17 September 2014 18:30	Wiener Neustadt	A	5–1	4,100	Beric 3' 55'; Schaub 48' 72' (yellow card) 76' (red card); Hofmann M. 80'	Rauter 23'	3rd	12	+1	
9	20 September 2014 16:00	Wolfsberg	H	3–0	15,200	Beric 37' 48'; Kainz 61'		3rd	15	+4	
10	28 September 2014 16:30	Red Bull Salzburg	H	1–2	25,300	Prosenik 90+3'	Bruno 84'; Alan 89'	3rd	15	+3	
11	5 October 2014 16:30	Ried	A	2–1	5,200	Beric 52'; Sonnleitner 59'	Kragl 45+1'	3rd	18	+4	
12	18 October 2014 18:30	Admira Wacker	H	0–0	15,200			3rd	19	+4	
13	25 October 2014 16:00	Sturm Graz	A	3–1	14,350	Schwab 36'; Beric 44' (yellow card) 86' (red card); Dibon 66'	Schick 48'	3rd	22	+6	
14	2 November 2014 16:30	SCR Altach	A	0–2	7,372	Sonnleitner (red card) 2'	Roth 25'; Tajouri 88'	3rd	22	+4	
15	9 November 2014 14:30	Austria Wien	H	2–3	28,200	Alar 83'; Beric 90+2'	Damari 23' 40'; Royer 78'	4th	22	+3	
16	22 November 2014 16:00	Grödig	A	1–3	2,500	Alar 14'	Reyna 7'; Huspek 45' 73'	5th	22	+1	
17	29 November 2014 18:30	Wiener Neustadt	H	3–0	12,300	Kainz 13'; Beric 72' 78'	Schöpf (red card) 43'	4th	25	+4	
18	7 December 2014 16:30	Wolfsberg	A	1–1	5,250	Schwab 70'	Seebacher 65'	5th	26	+4	
19	14 December 2014 16:30	Red Bull Salzburg	A	2–1	17,200	Beric 80' 90+4'	Ramalho (yellow card) 23' (red card); Sabitzer 84'	4th	29	+5	
20	14 February 2015 16:00	Ried	H	3–0	14,000	Alar 17' (pen.) 39' (pen.); Beric 45+1' (pen.)	Gebauer (red card) 14'; Trauner (red card) 38'	4th	32	+8	
21	22 February 2015 16:30	Admira Wacker	A	1–1	5,000	Beric 34'	Weber 74'	2nd	33	+8	
22	28 February 2015 18:30	Sturm Graz	H	1–0	15,200	Beric 45+2'	Ehrenreich (red card) 3'	2nd	36	+9	
23	4 March 2015 19:00	SCR Altach	H	1–0	8,700	Alar (penalty missed); Prosenik 90+5'	Zech (yellow card) 90+4' (red card)	2nd	39	+10	
24	8 March 2015 16:30	Austria Wien	A	1–2	11,000	Hofmann S. 17'	Rotpuller 45+5'; Ramsebner (yellow card) 73' (red card); Sikov 84'	2nd	39	+9	
25	14 March 2015 18:30	Grödig	H	4–0	15,700	Pavelic 4'; Schaub 9'; Kainz 46'; Schobesberger 66'		2nd	42	+13	
26	22 March 2015 16:30	Wiener Neustadt	A	1–0	4,300	Beric 48'		2nd	45	+14	
27	4 April 2015 18:30	Wolfsberg	H	4–1	12,200	Schobesberger 13'; Schwab 15'; Beric 64' 86'	Jacobo 67' (pen.)	2nd	48	+17	
28	12 April 2015 18:00	Red Bull Salzburg	H	3–3	26,800	Beric 51'; Schobesberger 59'; Pavelic (yellow card) 80' (red card); Prosenik 90+2'	Berisha 3'; Soriano 18'; Sabitzer 32'; Ulmer (red card) 43'	2nd	49	+17	
29	18 April 2015 16:00	Ried	A	1–0	6,500	Schobesberger 36'		2nd	52	+18	
30	25 April 2015 18:30	Admira Wacker	H	1–1	13,800	Schobesberger 70'	Sulimani 80'	2nd	53	+18	
31	18 May 03 16:30	Sturm Graz	A	2–2	15,300	Schobesberger 8'; Petsos 54'	Piesinger 16'; Beichler 70'; Kienast (yellow card) 87' (red card); Madl (yellow card) 90+4' (red card)	2nd	54	+18	
32	10 May 2015 16:30	SCR Altach	A	3–1	7,100	Beric 79' 86'; Schobesberger 90'	Roth 25'	2nd	57	+20	
33	17 May 2015 16:30	Austria Wien	H	4–1	29,800	Schobesberger 45'; Hofmann S. 55' (pen.); Beric 70'; Sonnleitner 89'	de Paula 52'	2nd	60	+23	
35	24 May 2015 17:45	Wiener Neustadt	H	0–0	15,800	Hofmann S. (penalty missed)		2nd	61	+23	
34	27 May 2015 18:30	Grödig	A	2–0	1,712	Beric (83.); Alar 90+2' (pen.)	Maak (red card) 90+1'	2nd	64	+25	
36	31 May 2015 16:30	Wolfsberg	A	5–0	5,350	Schaub 50' 90+3'; Beric 63' 83' 85'		2nd	67	+30	

=== League table ===
Pos	Team	Pld	W	D	L	GF	GA	GD	Pts	Qualification or relegation
1	Red Bull Salzburg (C)	36	22	7	7	99	42	+57	73	Qualification for the Champions League third qualifying round
2	Rapid Wien	36	19	10	7	68	38	+30	67	Qualification for the Champions League third qualifying round
3	SCR Altach	36	17	8	11	50	49	+1	59	Qualification for the Europa League third qualifying round
4	Sturm Graz	36	16	10	10	57	41	+16	58	Qualification for the Europa League third qualifying round
5	Wolfsberger AC	36	16	4	16	44	50	−6	52	Qualification for the Europa League second qualifying round

Source: weltfussball.de (in German)
Rules for classification: 1) points; 2) goal difference; 3) number of goals scored
(C) Champions

=== Results summary ===
Overall								Home						Away					
Pld	W	D	L	GF	GA	GD	Pts	W	D	L	GF	GA	GD	W	D	L	GF	GA	GD
36	19	10	7	68	38	+30	67	10	5	3	34	13	+21	9	5	4	34	25	+9

Last updated: 31 May 2015.

== Austrian Cup ==
=== Austrian Cup fixtures and results ===
Round	Date	Opponent	Venue	Result F–A	Attendance	Goalscorers and disciplined players		Ref.
Round	Date	Opponent	Venue	Result F–A	Attendance	Rapid Wien	Opponent	Ref.
Round 1	11 July 2014 19:30	SKU Amstetten	A	1–0 (a.e.t.)	3,000	Dibon 116'	Zeman (yellow card) 116' (red card)	
Round 2	24 September 2014 18:00	SV Wallern	A	1–0	2,700	Prosenik 29'		
Round of 16	29 October 2014 20:30	Sturm Graz	H	1–0	7,800	Schwab 5'		
Quarter-final	7 April 2015 18:00	Wolfsberger AC	A	1–2	3,600	Schobesberger 90+4'	Kerhe 25'; Wernitznig 28'	

== Europa League ==
=== Europa League fixtures and results ===
Win Draw Loss Postponed

Leg	Date	Opponent	Venue	Result F–A	Agg. score F–A	Attendance	Goalscorers and disciplined players		Ref.
Leg	Date	Opponent	Venue	Result F–A	Agg. score F–A	Attendance	Rapid Wien	Opponent	Ref.
Play-off round
1st Leg	21 August 2014 18:00	HJK Helsinki (Finland)	A	1–2		6,153	Schaub 58'	Lod 63'; Väyrynen 74'	
2nd Leg	28 August 2014 20:30	HJK Helsinki (Finland)	H	3–3	4–5	21,100	Schaub 10' 13'; Wydra 90+4'	Kandji 15'; Alho 77'; Savage 88' (pen.)	

== Squad statistics ==
No.	Nat.	Name	Age	League		Cup		Europa League		Total		Discipline	
No.	Nat.	Name	Age	Apps	Goals	Apps	Goals	Apps	Goals	Apps	Goals	Booked	Sent off (straight red)
Goalkeepers
1	(Slovakia)	Ján Novota	30	29		3		2		34			
21	(Austria)	Tobias Knoflach	20										
29	(Croatia)	Marko Maric	18	7		1				8			
Defenders
4	(Austria)	Thomas Schrammel	26	32	1	4		2		38	1	7	
6	(Austria)	Mario Sonnleitner	27	33	2	3		2		38	2	4	1
17	(Austria)	Christopher Dibon	23	15+1	1	2	1	1		18+1	2	5	
20	(Austria)	Maximilian Hofmann	20	23	1	3		1+1		27+1	1	7	
22	(Austria)	Mario Pavelic	20	27+1	1	1+1		2		30+2	1	5	1
23	(Austria)	Stefan Stangl	22	12+3		2				14+3		1	
36	(Austria)	Michael Schimpelsberger	23										
39	(Austria)	Ferdinand Weinwurm	24	1						1		1	
Midfielders
3	(Germany)	Brian Behrendt	23	6+4		1		2		9+4		3	
5	(Greece)	Thanos Petsos	23	25+2	1	3		0+1		28+3	1	10	
7	(Austria)	Philipp Schobesberger	20	14+13	8	2+1	1			16+14	9	3	
8	(Austria)	Stefan Schwab	23	24+6	4	3+1	1	2		29+7	5	11	
10	(Austria)	Louis Schaub	19	24+4	5	3		2	3	29+4	8	2	1
11	(Germany)	Steffen Hofmann	33	29+7	4	2+2		2		33+9	4	3	
14	(Austria)	Florian Kainz	21	30+2	4	3		1+1		34+3	4	6	
15	(Bosnia and Herzegovina)	Srdan Grahovac	21	7+6		2+1				9+7		2	
25	(Austria)	Dominik Wydra	20	12+6		0+2		1+1	1	13+9	1	4	
27	(Austria)	Andreas Kuen	19										
31	(Austria)	Armin Mujakic	19	0+1						0+1			
33	(Austria)	Deni Alar	24	9+16	6	2				11+16	6	3	
34	(Austria)	Dominik Starkl	20	2+13		0+1		0+2		2+16		1	
Forwards
9	(Slovenia)	Robert Beric	23	31+2	27	2+2		2		35+4	27	7	2
38	(Austria)	Philipp Prosenik	21	2+15	3	1+1	1			3+16	4	1	
Players who left after the start of the season
26	(Austria)	Lukas Grozurek	22	2+3		1				3+3			

Statistics accurate as of 31 May 2015

=== Goal scorers ===
Rank	Name	Bundesliga	Cup	Europa League	Total
1	(Slovenia) Robert Beric	27			27
2	(Austria) Philipp Schobesberger	8	1		9
3	(Austria) Louis Schaub	5		3	8
4	(Austria) Deni Alar	6			6
5	(Austria) Stefan Schwab	4	1		5
6	(Germany) Steffen Hofmann	4			4
6	(Austria) Florian Kainz	4			4
6	(Austria) Philipp Prosenik	3	1		4
9	(Austria) Christopher Dibon	1	1		2
9	(Austria) Mario Sonnleitner	2			2
11	(Austria) Maximilian Hofmann	1			1
11	(Austria) Mario Pavelic	1			1
11	(Greece) Thanos Petsos	1			1
11	(Austria) Thomas Schrammel	1			1
11	(Austria) Dominik Wydra			1	1
Totals		68	4	4	76
