= Louis Schaub =

Footballer (born 1994)

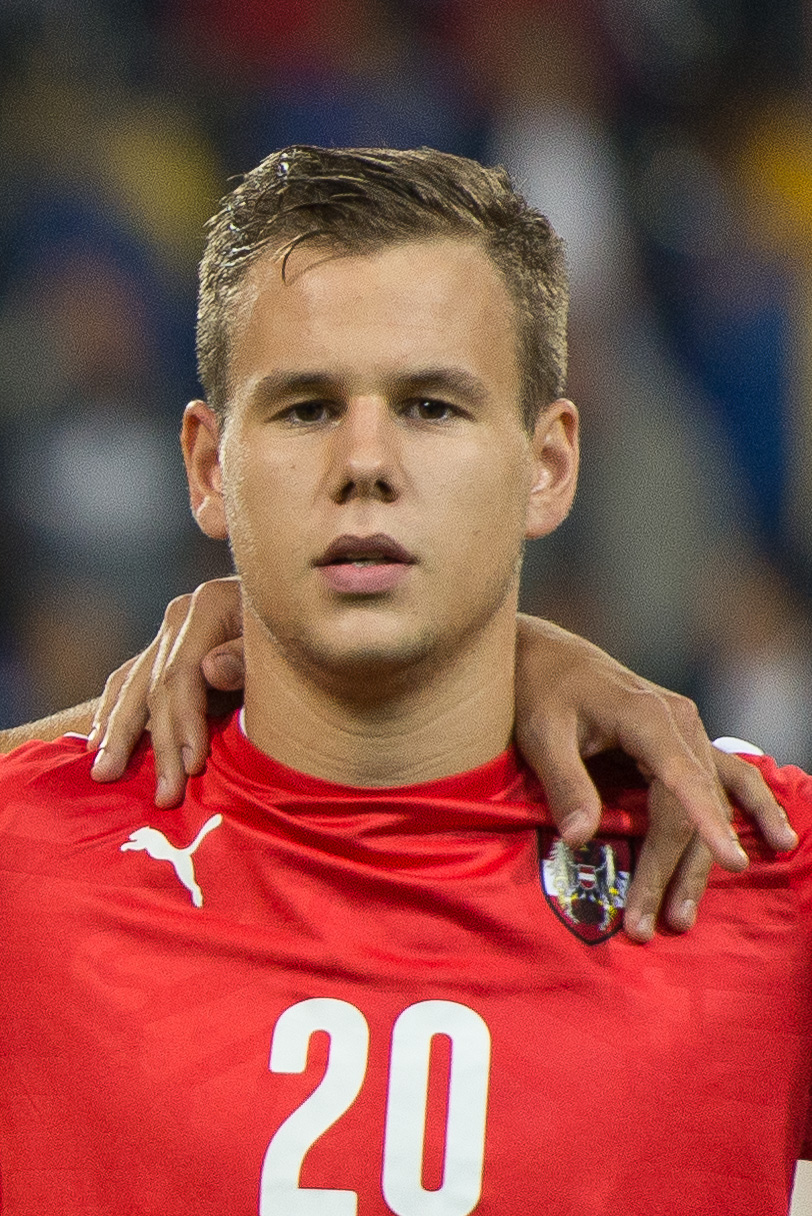
- Schaub with Austria U21 in 2014

Personal information
- Date of birth: 29 December 1994 (age 31)
- Place of birth: Fulda, Hesse, Germany
- Height: 1.77 m (5 ft 10 in)
- Position: Attacking midfielder

Team information
- Current team: Rapid Wien
- Number: 21

Youth career
- –2007: Admira
- 2007–2011: Rapid Wien

Senior career*
| Years | Team | Apps | (Gls) |
| 2011–2012 | Rapid Wien II | 29 | (5) |
| 2012–2018 | Rapid Wien | 160 | (25) |
| 2018−2022 | 1. FC Köln | 64 | (5) |
| 2020 | → Hamburger SV (loan) | 12 | (0) |
| 2020–2021 | → Luzern (loan) | 32 | (8) |
| 2022–2024 | Hannover 96 | 54 | (8) |
| 2024– | Rapid Wien | 45 | (3) |

International career
| 2010 | Austria U16 | 3 | (0) |
| 2010 | Austria U17 | 4 | (0) |
| 2012–2013 | Austria U19 | 9 | (3) |
| 2013–2016 | Austria U21 | 17 | (3) |
| 2016–2022 | Austria | 31 | (8) |
- * Club domestic league appearances and goals as of 24 October 2026

Louis Schaub (German pronunciation: [ˈluːi ˈʃaʊ̯p]; born 29 December 1994) is a professional footballer who plays as a midfielder for Austrian Bundesliga club Rapid Wien.

Schaub was selected by influential football website IBWM in their list of the 100 most exciting players in world football for 2014.

Born in Fulda, Germany, Schaub represented Austria at various youth levels, and was a full international for the senior side, having played for the latter from 2016 to 2022, winning 31 caps and scoring 8 goals across six years, with his last appearance for Austria being in November 2021.

== Club career ==
Schaub made his debut for Rapid Wien's senior team in the 3–0 Austrian Football Bundesliga win over Sturm Graz on 18 August 2012. On 4 August 2015, Schaub scored two goals, including the winning goal in an unexpected 3–2 victory for Rapid Wien against Ajax Amsterdam in the UEFA Champions League qualifier.

Having played for 1. FC Köln since 2018, Schaub was loaned to Swiss side Luzern for the 2020–21 season. He joined Hannover 96 on a free transfer in July 2022.

On 28 May 2024, Schaub returned to Austria, rejoining Rapid Wien at the wake of the 2024–25 season, having departed Hannover the previous season.

== International career ==
Schaub has been capped at four different age groups for Austria. He made his debut for Austria U21 in a 2015 UEFA European Under-21 Football Championship qualification Group 4 1–0 win over Albania U21 on 14 August 2013, coming on as a 76th-minute substitute.

Schaub was named in Austria's senior squad for a 2018 FIFA World Cup qualifier against Wales in September 2016. He was included in the squad for the delayed UEFA Euro 2020 tournament in June 2021.

== Personal life ==
Schaub was born into a mixed German-Austrian family. His mother is Austrian and his father German, making him eligible to represent either nation internationally. His father, Fred, was a professional football player as well, having spent most of his career in the German Bundesliga. Fred died in April 2003 in a car accident; Louis was in the car and survived the accident. His younger sister Chiara also plays football and has represented Austria at youth level.

== Career statistics ==
=== Club ===
As of match played 27 October 2026

Appearances and goals by club, season and competition
| Club | Season | League | | | Cup | | Continental | | Other | | Total | |
| Club | Season | Division | Apps | Goals | Apps | Goals | Apps | Goals | Apps | Goals | Apps | Goals |
|---|---|---|---|---|---|---|---|---|---|---|---|---|
| Rapid Wien | 2012–13 | Austrian Bundesliga | 16 | 2 | 1 | 0 | 0 | 0 | — | | 17 | 2 |
| Rapid Wien | 2013–14 | Austrian Bundesliga | 34 | 3 | 1 | 0 | 10 | 4 | — | | 45 | 7 |
| Rapid Wien | 2014–15 | Austrian Bundesliga | 28 | 5 | 3 | 0 | 2 | 3 | — | | 33 | 8 |
| Rapid Wien | 2015–16 | Austrian Bundesliga | 24 | 5 | 2 | 0 | 8 | 4 | — | | 34 | 9 |
| Rapid Wien | 2016–17 | Austrian Bundesliga | 28 | 5 | 3 | 1 | 10 | 5 | — | | 41 | 11 |
| Rapid Wien | 2017–18 | Austrian Bundesliga | 30 | 5 | 4 | 3 | — | | — | | 34 | 8 |
| Rapid Wien | Total | | 160 | 25 | 14 | 4 | 30 | 16 | — | | 204 | 45 |
| 1. FC Köln | 2018–19 | 2. Bundesliga | 27 | 3 | 2 | 1 | — | | — | | 29 | 4 |
| 1. FC Köln | 2019–20 | Bundesliga | 9 | 1 | 2 | 1 | — | | — | | 11 | 2 |
| 1. FC Köln | 2021–22 | Bundesliga | 28 | 1 | 2 | 0 | — | | — | | 30 | 1 |
| 1. FC Köln | Total | | 64 | 5 | 6 | 2 | — | | — | | 70 | 7 |
| Hamburger SV (loan) | 2019–20 | 2. Bundesliga | 12 | 0 | — | | — | | — | | 12 | 0 |
| Luzern (loan) | 2020–21 | Swiss Super League | 32 | 8 | 4 | 1 | — | | — | | 36 | 9 |
| Hannover 96 | 2022–23 | 2. Bundesliga | 25 | 5 | 1 | 0 | — | | — | | 26 | 5 |
| Hannover 96 | 2023–24 | 2. Bundesliga | 29 | 3 | 1 | 1 | — | | — | | 30 | 4 |
| Hannover 96 | Total | | 54 | 8 | 2 | 1 | — | | — | | 56 | 9 |
| Rapid Wien | 2024–25 | Austrian Bundesliga | 29 | 2 | 2 | 0 | 13 (Note: Four appearances in UEFA Europa League, nine appearances and three goals in UEFA Conference League) | 3 | — | | 44 | 5 |
| Rapid Wien | 2025–26 | Austrian Bundesliga | 8 | 1 | 0 | 0 | 9 (Note: Appearances in UEFA Conference League) | 0 | — | | 17 | 1 |
| Rapid Wien | 2026–27 | Austrian Bundesliga | 8 | 0 | 3 | 0 | 4 | 1 | — | | 15 | 1 |
| Rapid Wien | Total | | 45 | 3 | 5 | 0 | 26 | 4 | — | | 76 | 7 |
| Career total | | | 367 | 49 | 31 | 8 | 55 | 21 | 0 | 0 | 454 | 78 |

=== International ===
As of match played 15 November 2021

Appearances and goals by national team and year
| National team | Year | Apps | Goals |
|---|---|---|---|
| Austria | 2016 | 2 | 0 |
| Austria | 2017 | 4 | 4 |
| Austria | 2018 | 5 | 1 |
| Austria | 2019 | 3 | 0 |
| Austria | 2020 | 3 | 1 |
| Austria | 2021 | 12 | 2 |
| Total | | 31 | 8 |

As of match played 12 November 2021
Scores and results list Austria's goal tally first, score column indicates score after each Schaub goal.

List of international goals scored by Louis Schaub
| No. | Date | Venue | Opponent | Score | Result | Competition |
|---|---|---|---|---|---|---|
| 1 | 5 September 2017 | Ernst-Happel-Stadion, Vienna, Austria | Georgia | 1–1 | 1–1 | 2018 FIFA World Cup qualification |
| 2 | 6 October 2017 | Ernst-Happel-Stadion, Vienna, Austria | Serbia | 3–2 | 3–2 | 2018 FIFA World Cup qualification |
| 3 | 9 October 2017 | Zimbru Stadium, Chișinău, Moldova | Moldova | 1–0 | 1–0 | 2018 FIFA World Cup qualification |
| 4 | 14 November 2017 | Ernst-Happel-Stadion, Vienna, Austria | Uruguay | 2–1 | 2–1 | Friendly |
| 5 | 27 March 2018 | Stade Josy Barthel, Luxembourg City, Luxembourg | Luxembourg | 4–0 | 4–0 | Friendly |
| 6 | 15 November 2020 | Ernst-Happel-Stadion, Vienna, Austria | Northern Ireland | 1–1 | 2–1 | 2020–21 UEFA Nations League B |
| 7 | 12 November 2021 | Wörthersee Stadion, Klagenfurt, Austria | Israel | 2–2 | 4–2 | 2022 FIFA World Cup qualification |
| 8 | 12 November 2021 | Wörthersee Stadion, Klagenfurt, Austria | Israel | 3–2 | 4–2 | 2022 FIFA World Cup qualification |
