= Lukas Grozurek =

Austrian footballer

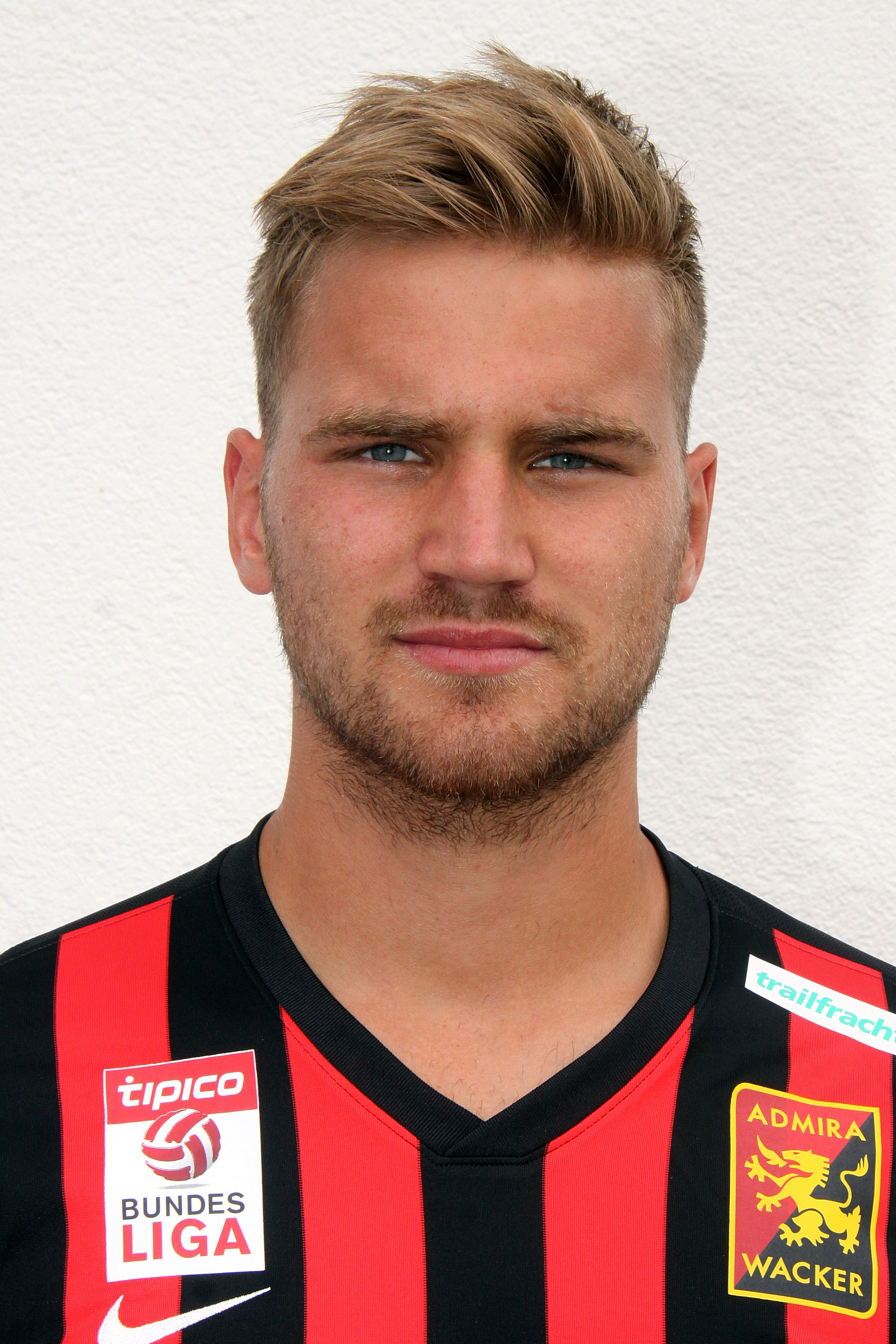
- Grozurek with Admira Wacker in July 2015

Personal information
- Date of birth: 22 December 1991 (age 34)
- Place of birth: Vienna, Austria
- Height: 1.88 m (6 ft 2 in)
- Position: Left midfielder

Team information
- Current team: First Vienna
- Number: 23

Youth career
- 1998–2008: Wiener SC

Senior career*
Years	Team	Apps	(Gls)
2008–2010	Wiener SC	43	(5)
2010–2013	Rapid Wien Amateure	44	(12)
2012–2014	Rapid Wien	64	(3)
2015–2018	Admira Wacker	92	(16)
2018–2020	Sturm Graz	26	(5)
2019–2020	→ Karlsruher SC (loan)	18	(1)
2020	St. Pölten	9	(1)
2021–2022	Dinamo Batumi	28	(2)
2022–	First Vienna	31	(5)

International career
2009	Austria U-18	1	(0)
2012	Austria U-21	2	(0)
- * Club domestic league appearances and goals as of 20 June 2023

Lukas Grozurek (born 22 December 1991) is an Austrian professional footballer who plays as a left midfielder for First Vienna.

== Club career ==
During the winter break of the 2014–15 season, Grozurek left Rapid Wien and joined nearby Admira Wacker. He signed a contract for 18 months until 2016 including an extension clause for another year.

On 17 September 2020 he signed a one-year contract with an extension option with SKN St. Pölten.

In January 2021, Grozurek signed with Dinamo Batumi from the Georgian highest division.

== Career statistics ==
=== Club ===
As of match played 25 August 2020

Appearances and goals by club, season and competition
Club	Season	League			Cup		Continental		Total	
Club	Season	Division	Apps	Goals	Apps	Goals	Apps	Goals	Apps	Goals
Rapid Wien Amateure	2010–11	Regionalliga Ost	28	4	0	0	—		28	4
Rapid Wien Amateure	2011–12	Regionalliga Ost	14	6	2	2	—		16	8
Rapid Wien Amateure	2012–13	Regionalliga Ost	2	2	0	0	—		2	2
Rapid Wien Amateure	Total		44	12	2	2	0	0	46	14
Rapid Wien	2011–12	Austrian Bundesliga	13	1	0	0	—		13	1
Rapid Wien	2012–13	Austrian Bundesliga	24	2	4	2	5 (Note: Appearances in the Europa League)	0	33	4
Rapid Wien	2013–14	Austrian Bundesliga	22	0	1	0	6	0	29	0
Rapid Wien	2014–15	Austrian Bundesliga	5	0	1	0	0	0	6	0
Rapid Wien	Total		64	3	6	2	11	0	81	5
Admira Wacker	2014–15	Austrian Bundesliga	13	0	0	0	—		13	0
Admira Wacker	2015–16	Austrian Bundesliga	25	4	5	2	—		30	6
Admira Wacker	2016–17	Austrian Bundesliga	19	2	3	0	2	0	24	2
Admira Wacker	2017–18	Austrian Bundesliga	35	10	2	1	—		37	11
Admira Wacker	Total		92	16	10	3	2	0	104	19
Sturm Graz	2018–19	Austrian Bundesliga	26	5	1	0	2 (Note: One appearance in the Champions League and one in the Europa League)	0	29	5
Karlsruher SC (loan)	2019–20	2. Bundesliga	18	1	2	1	—		20	2
Career total			244	37	21	8	15	0	280	45
