= Christopher Dibon =

Austrian footballer

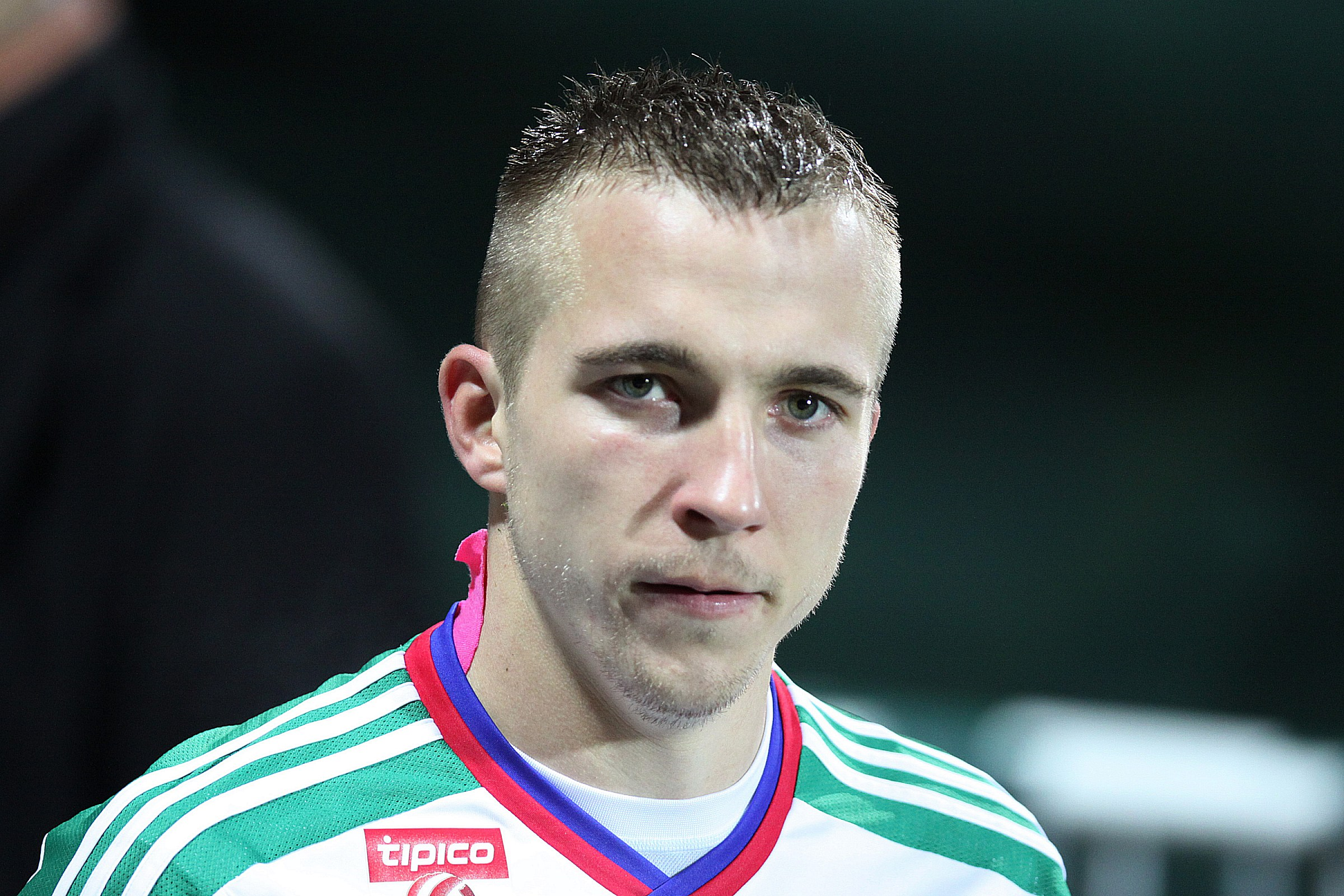
- Dibon in 2015

Personal information
- Date of birth: 2 November 1990 (age 36)
- Place of birth: Schwechat, Austria
- Height: 1.81 m (5 ft 11 in)
- Position: Defender

Senior career*
Years	Team	Apps	(Gls)
2007–2012	Admira Wacker	107	(7)
2008	→ SK Schwadorf (loan)	12	(2)
2012–2014	Red Bull Salzburg	6	(0)
2013–2014	→ Rapid Wien (loan)	27	(0)
2014–2022	Rapid Wien	107	(8)
2015–	Rapid Wien II	23	(8)

International career
	Austria U18	5	(0)
2008–2009	Austria U19	5	(2)
2009–2012	Austria U21	20	(2)
2011–	Austria	1	(1)
- * Club domestic league appearances and goals as of 10 November 2023

Christopher Dibon (born 2 November 1990) is an Austrian professional footballer who plays as a defender for Austrian Regionalliga club Rapid Wien II.

== Career statistics ==
=== Club ===
As of match played 23 August 2024

Appearances and goals by club, season and competition
Club	Season	League			National Cup (Note: Includes Austrian Cup)		Europe		Other		Total	
Club	Season	Division	Apps	Goals	Apps	Goals	Apps	Goals	Apps	Goals	Apps	Goals
Admira Wacker	2007–08	Regionalliga Ost	15	2	0	0	—		—		15	2
Admira Wacker	2008–09	2. Liga	25	0	5	0	—		—		30	0
Admira Wacker	2009–10	2. Liga	31	3	3	0	—		—		34	3
Admira Wacker	2010–11	2. Liga	36	1	0	0	—		—		36	1
Admira Wacker	2011–12	Austrian Bundesliga	20	1	3	0	—		—		23	1
Admira Wacker	Total		127	7	11	0	—		—		138	7
Schwadorf (loan)	2007–08	2. Liga	12	2	0	0	—		—		12	2
Red Bull Salzburg	2012–13	Austrian Bundesliga	6	0	1	0	—		—		7	0
Rapid Wien (loan)	2013–14	Austrian Bundesliga	27	0	1	0	9 (Note: Appearance(s) in UEFA Europa League)	0	—		37	0
Rapid Wien	2014–15	Austrian Bundesliga	16	1	2	1	1	0	—		19	2
Rapid Wien	2015–16	Austrian Bundesliga	23	1	2	0	8 (Note: Three appearances in UEFA Champions League and five in UEFA Europa League)	0	—		33	1
Rapid Wien	2016–17	Austrian Bundesliga	26	1	4	0	9	0	—		39	1
Rapid Wien	2018–19	Austrian Bundesliga	15	2	1	0	2	0	—		18	2
Rapid Wien	2019–20	Austrian Bundesliga	22	2	2	1	—		—		24	3
Rapid Wien	2021–22	Austrian Bundesliga	3	0	0	0	1 (Note: Appearance(s) in UEFA Champions League)	0	—		4	0
Rapid Wien	2022–23	Austrian Bundesliga	2	0	1	0	—		—		3	0
Rapid Wien	Total		134	7	13	2	30	0	—		177	9
Career total			279	16	25	2	30	0	—		334	18
