= Lukas Denner =

Austrian professional footballer

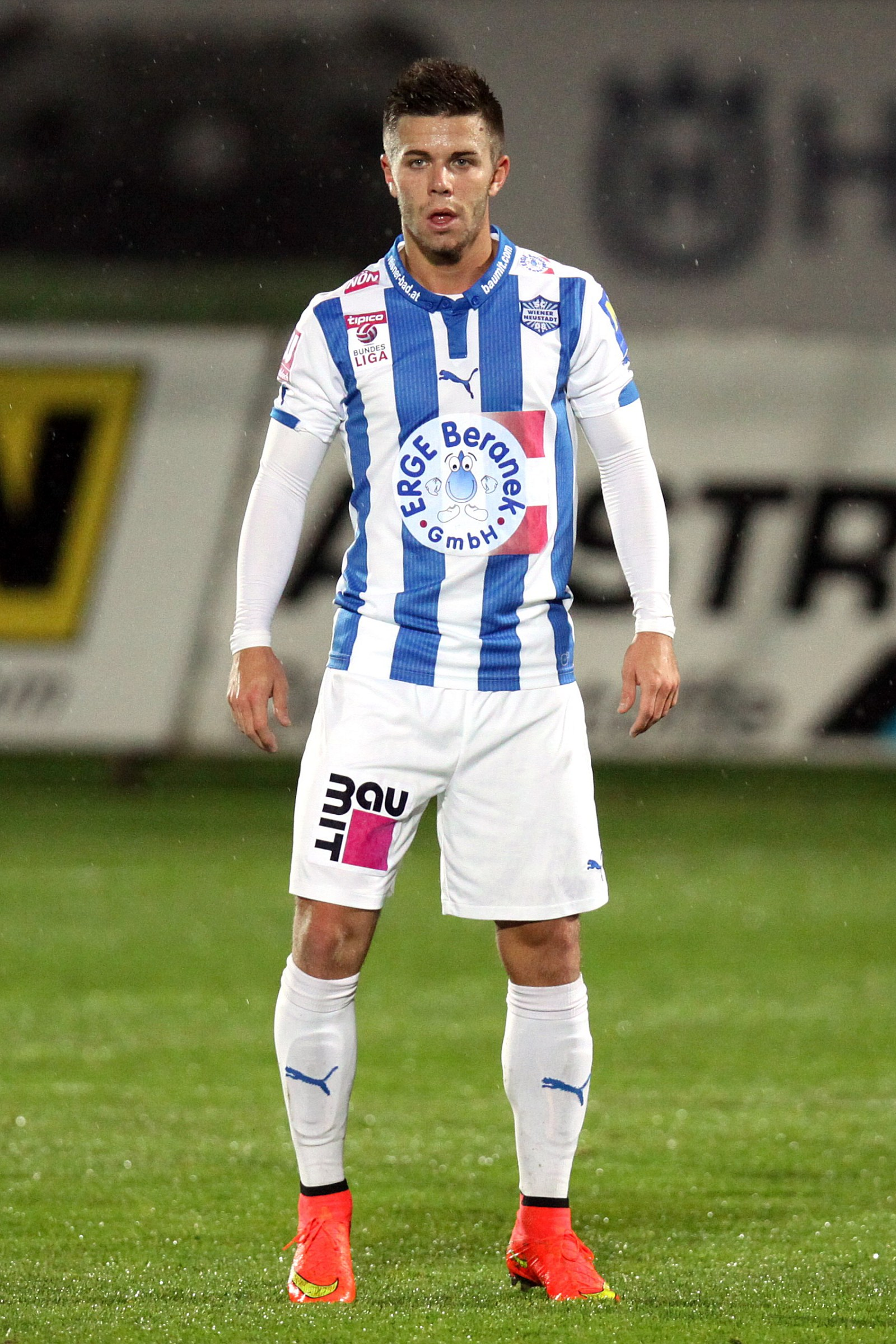

Personal information
- Full name: Lukas Denner
- Date of birth: 19 June 1991 (age 35)
- Place of birth: Vienna, Austria
- Height: 1.70 m (5 ft 7 in)
- Position: Left back

Team information
- Current team: ASV 13
- Number: 19

Senior career*
Years	Team	Apps	(Gls)
2010–2014	Rapid Wien II	68	(1)
2013–2014	Rapid Wien	4	(0)
2013–2014	→ Wiener Neustadt (loan)	9	(0)
2014–2015	Wiener Neustadt	23	(0)
2015–2016	SV Grödig	28	(0)
2016–2017	SV Horn	13	(0)
2018	Wiener Neustadt II	4	(0)
2018	Wiener Neustadt	1	(0)
2018–2019	SV Horn	17	(0)
2020	ASK Kottingbrunn	0	(0)
2020–	ASV 13	4	(1)
- * Club domestic league appearances and goals as of 15:07, 31 January 2021 (UTC)

Lukas Denner (born 19 June 1991) is an Austrian professional footballer who plays for ASV 13 as a left back.

== Career ==
On 4 June 2014 after loaned out for 6 months, he signed permanently with SC Wiener Neustadt.
