= Gulverd Tomashvili =

Georgian footballer

Personal information
- Date of birth: 13 October 1988 (age 38)
- Place of birth: Tbilisi, Georgia
- Height: 1.86 m (6 ft 1 in)
- Position: Centre back

Senior career*
Years	Team	Apps	(Gls)
2005–2012	FC Dinamo Tbilisi	132	(6)
2012–2014	Dila Gori	30	(3)
2014–2015	FC Samtredia	4	(0)
2015–2016	Dila Gori	4	(0)
2016–2017	FC Tskhinvali	9	(1)
2017	Locomotive Tbilisi	3	(0)
2017–2020	Sioni Bolnisi	53	(0)
2021	Shevardeni 1906	10	(0)
2022	Rustavi	4	(0)

International career
2006–2008	Georgia U19	12	(1)
2008–2010	Georgia U21	18	(0)
2013	Georgia	1	(0)
- * Club domestic league appearances and goals as of 2 December 2022

Gulverd Tomashvili (Georgian: გულვერდ თომაშვილი; born 13 October 1988) is a retired Georgian football player who most recently played for Rustavi. He represented Georgia at Under-19 and Under-21 level.

== Career ==
=== Club ===
Tomashvili made three appearances for Dinamo Tbilisi in the 2006–07 season. He made his European debut for the club in July 2008, as a late substitute for Levan Khmaladze in the 3–0 win at home to NSÍ Runavík in the UEFA Champions League 1st qualifying round. He also featured in the two games against Panathinaikos in the following round. He played at right-back in the 2009 Georgian FA Cup Final, which Dinamo won on penalties after a 1–1 draw against FC Olimpi Rustavi.

Between 2017 and 2021 Tomashvili spent four seasons at Sioni. He left the club along with ten other players. In July 2022, Tomashvili joined Liga 2 side Rustavi but following their relegation to Liga 3, early next year the club announced his departure.

=== International ===
Tomashvili is one of the most capped Georgian U21 player. In 2008–10, he played 18 competitive matches.

In June 2013, while at Dila, Tomashvili received a call-up to the senior team for international friendlies against Denmark and Ireland.
