= Julian Baumgartner =

Austrian footballer (born 1994)

Personal information
- Full name: Julian Baumgartner
- Date of birth: 27 July 1994 (age 32)
- Place of birth: Ried im Innkreis, Austria
- Position: Midfielder

Team information
- Current team: SV Ried II
- Number: 7

Youth career
- 2001–2004: Union Mehrnbach
- 2004–2012: SV Ried

Senior career*
Years	Team	Apps	(Gls)
2012–2016	SV Ried	19	(0)
2016–2018	SV Wallern		
2018–2019	Hertha Wels	27	(1)
2019–2020	SV Grieskirchen	15	(1)
2020–	SV Ried II	11	(1)

International career
2012	Austria U19	2	(0)
- * Club domestic league appearances and goals as of 11:17, 26 October 2020 (UTC)

Julian Baumgartner (born 27 July 1994) is an Austrian footballer who plays for the reserve team of SV Ried.

== Career ==
=== Club career ===
Baumgartner began his career at Union Mehrnbach in Upper Austria. In 2004 he was signed by SV Ried and stayed in their youth department until 2012. After good performances in the youth teams, he was promoted into the first team by interim coach Gerhard Schweitzer. He made his debut in the Austrian Football Bundesliga on 5 May 2012 against the later relegated Kapfenberger SV when he came on in the 84th minute for Marco Meilinger. He was used one more time in the Bundesliga in that season.

For the 2016/17 season he moved to Austrian Landesliga club SV Wallern. After two seasons at Wallern, Baumgartner moved to WSC Hertha Wels in the summer 2018.

In the following season, he played for SV Grieskirchen, before returning to SV Ried, where he was registered for the clubs reserve team.
