= Oliver Drachta =

Austrian football referee

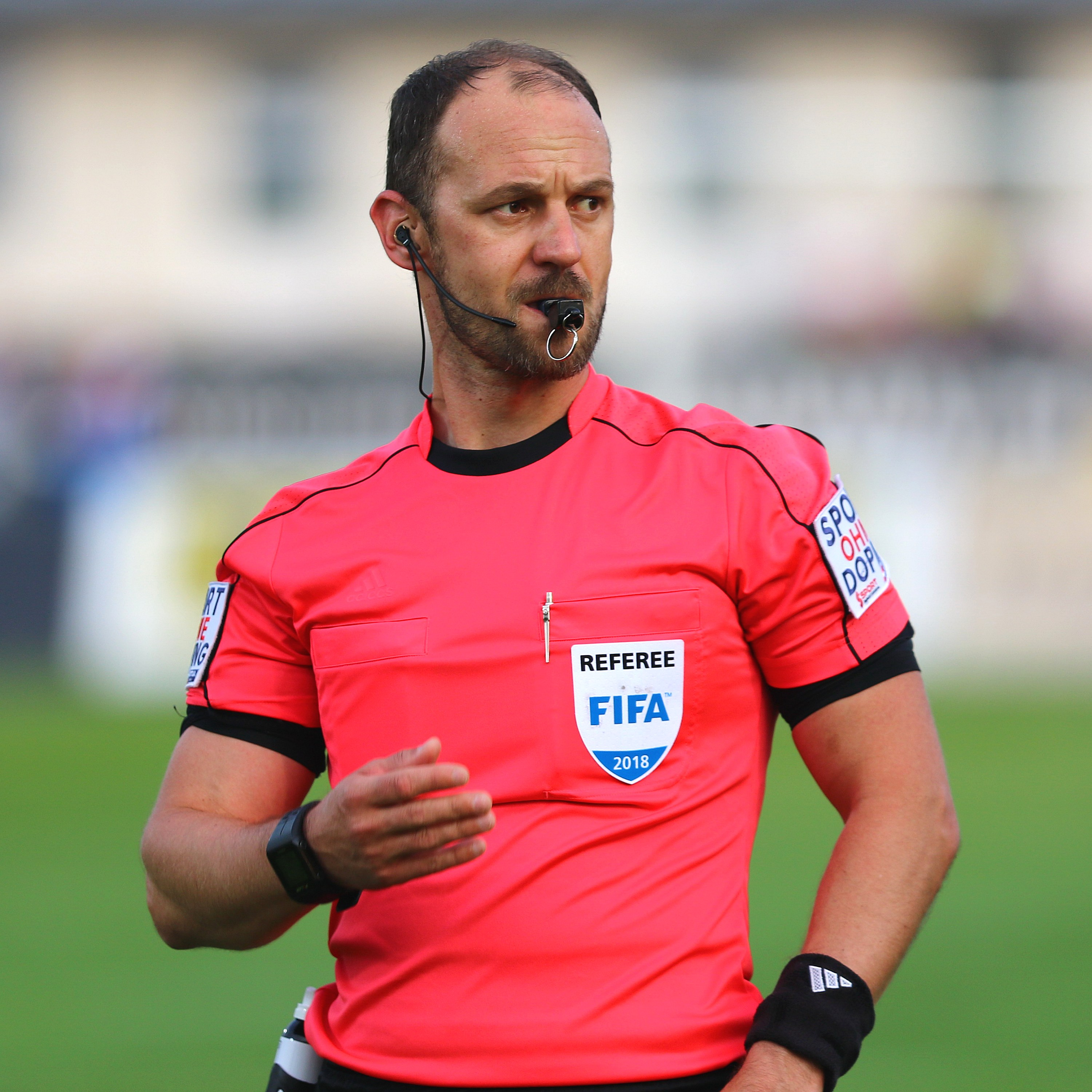
- Born: 15 May 1977 (age 49)

Domestic
Years	League	Role

International
Years	League	Role
2010–	FIFA listed	Referee

Oliver Drachta (born 15 May 1977) is an Austrian professional football referee. He has been a full international for FIFA since 2010.
