= Ferdinand Weinwurm =

Austrian footballer (born 1990)

Personal information
- Date of birth: 29 April 1990 (age 36)
- Place of birth: Hollabrunn, Austria
- Height: 1.87 m (6 ft 2 in)
- Position: Right-back

Youth career
- 1997–2009: UFC Obritz

Senior career*
Years	Team	Apps	(Gls)
2009	UFC Obritz	27+	(26)
2009–2011	SC Retz	57	(12)
2011–2015	SK Rapid Wien II	86	(5)
2014–2015	SK Rapid Wien	1	(0)
2015–2017	SV Horn	39	(3)
2017–2020	SC Retz	69	(8)
2023–2024	UFC Obritz	6	(1)
Total		285+	(55)
- * Club domestic league appearances and goals

Ferdinand Weinwurm (born 29 April 1990) is an Austrian former professional footballer who played as a right-back.
