= Terrence Boyd =

Soccer player (born 1991)

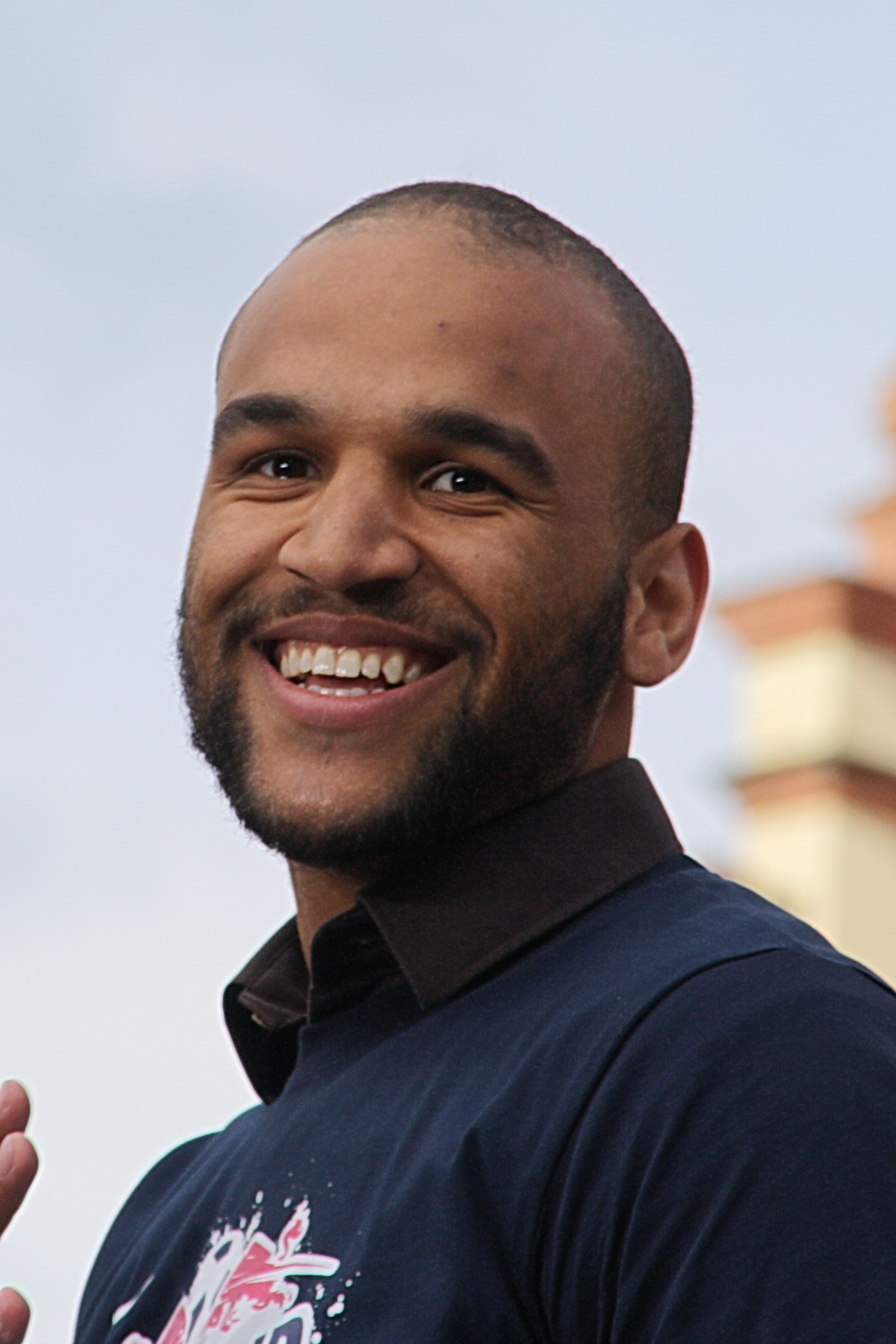
- Boyd in 2016

Personal information
- Full name: Terrence Anthony Boyd
- Date of birth: February 16, 1991 (age 35)
- Place of birth: Bremen, Germany
- Height: 1.88 m (6 ft 2 in)
- Position: Forward

Team information
- Current team: SV Waldhof Mannheim
- Number: 13

Youth career
- 1. FC Burg
- TSV Lesum-Burgdamm
- SC Weyhe
- LTS Bremerhaven
- FC Bremerhaven

Senior career*
Years	Team	Apps	(Gls)
2009–2011	Hertha BSC II	44	(15)
2011–2012	Borussia Dortmund II	32	(20)
2012–2014	Rapid Wien	59	(28)
2014–2017	RB Leipzig	7	(2)
2016	RB Leipzig II	9	(5)
2017–2019	Darmstadt 98	42	(5)
2019	Toronto FC	11	(0)
2019–2022	Hallescher FC	85	(39)
2022–2024	1. FC Kaiserslautern	54	(21)
2024–	SV Waldhof Mannheim	71	(25)

International career
2011	United States U20	2	(1)
2012	United States U23	2	(2)
2012–2016	United States	14	(0)
- * Club domestic league appearances and goals as of May 29, 2026

Terrence Anthony Boyd (born February 16, 1991) is a professional soccer player who plays as a forward for 3. Liga club SV Waldhof Mannheim. Born in Germany, he represented the United States national team.

== Early life ==
Boyd is the son of an American serviceman and his German wife. Shortly after his birth in Germany the family moved to Queens, New York. When his parents divorced, Terrence moved to Germany with his mother. She eventually remarried and Boyd credits his stepfather for much of his success, saying in a 2012 interview,

I don't think I would have become a pro without him because I am a lazy guy... He was really strict, but he helped me to stay out of the trouble and all the s*** that could do some problems for you. I'm a guy who is trying to get better every day, and that focus, I got it from him.

== Club career ==
=== Early career ===
Boyd grew up playing in various youth systems but made his senior debut with Hertha BSC II in 2009. After a couple of seasons primarily on the bench, where he made eight appearances and four appearances, he found a role in the starting lineup and ended his final season with 13 goals. After his contract with Hertha expired, he signed with Borussia Dortmund in the Bundesliga and debuted with their reserve squad Borussia Dortmund II. On October 22, 2011, Boyd received his first call-up to the Borussia Dortmund first team in their Bundesliga match against 1. FC Köln. Although he dressed as part of the 18-man squad, Boyd did not play in Dortmund's 5–0 win over 1. FC Köln. He did not make any appearances for the first team and scored 20 goals in 32 appearances for the reserve team.

=== Rapid Wien ===
In June 2012, Boyd signed a three–year deal with Austrian club Rapid Wien. On July 21, making his professional first team debut, Boyd scored his first and second league goals and added an assist against Wacker Innsbruck; Boyd was named the Man of the Match. The youngster was impressive for Rapid during his inaugural season in the Austrian Bundesliga, second on the team in scoring with 13 goals as the club finished in third place and securing a place in the third qualifying round of the 2013–14 UEFA Europa League. Boyd scored 37 goals in 80 appearances for Rapid.

=== RB Leipzig ===
In July 2014, Boyd was sold to RB Leipzig. On October 17, 2014, he made his debut in RB Leipzig's 1–0 loss to Nürnberg. He suffered a torn ACL in December 2014, missing the remainder of the season. Boyd finished the 2014–15 season with three goals in eight appearances. He did not make any appearances during the 2015–16 and 2016–17 seasons. However, he scored five goals in nine appearances for the reserve team.

=== Darmstadt 98 ===
After getting no playing time for Leipzig's senior team in the first half of the 2016–17 season, Boyd moved to SV Darmstadt 98 in January 2017. During the 2017–18 season, he scored four goals in 24 appearances.

=== Toronto FC ===
In February 2019, Boyd signed for Toronto FC.

=== Hallescher FC ===
In July 2019, Boyd returned to Germany, signing for 3. Liga side Hallescher FC. He scored seven goals and made one assist in 17 league appearances in the 2021–22 season. Overall, he amassed 39 goals in 86 appearances.

=== 1. FC Kaiserslautern ===
Boyd moved to a new 3. Liga team 1. FC Kaiserslautern in January 2022 and is currently their top scorer with 9 goals in 13 games for the German soccer club.

=== SV Waldhof Mannheim ===
On 10 January 2024, Boyd signed a contract with 3. Liga side SV Waldhof Mannheim.

== International career ==
Born to an African American serviceman and a German mother, Boyd holds dual citizenship. His path to the U.S. national team began when his Hertha youth teammate Bryan Arguez, then a United States U-20 international, told then U-20 Head Coach Thomas Rongen that there were several Americans on Hertha's books that Rongen needed to recruit. Rongen soon invited him to a U-20 training camp, but Boyd did not yet have a U.S. passport. For Boyd, the process of obtaining a passport forced him to deal with the pain of his family's breakup, as he needed his biological father to sign the necessary paperwork. He eventually connected with other relatives on Facebook and used his paternal aunt as a go-between to get his papers signed.

With his passport in hand, Boyd made several appearances for the United States U-20 team. Boyd was called into the U-23 camp in Europe in November 2011. Boyd also participated in the December 2011 U-23 camp in Florida. Boyd was initially called into the U-23 pre-Olympic Qualifying camp and was set to join the team for its February 29, 2012 match against Mexico's U-23 team. However, he instead made his debut with the full U.S. national team in its February 29 victory over Italy, coming on in the second half.

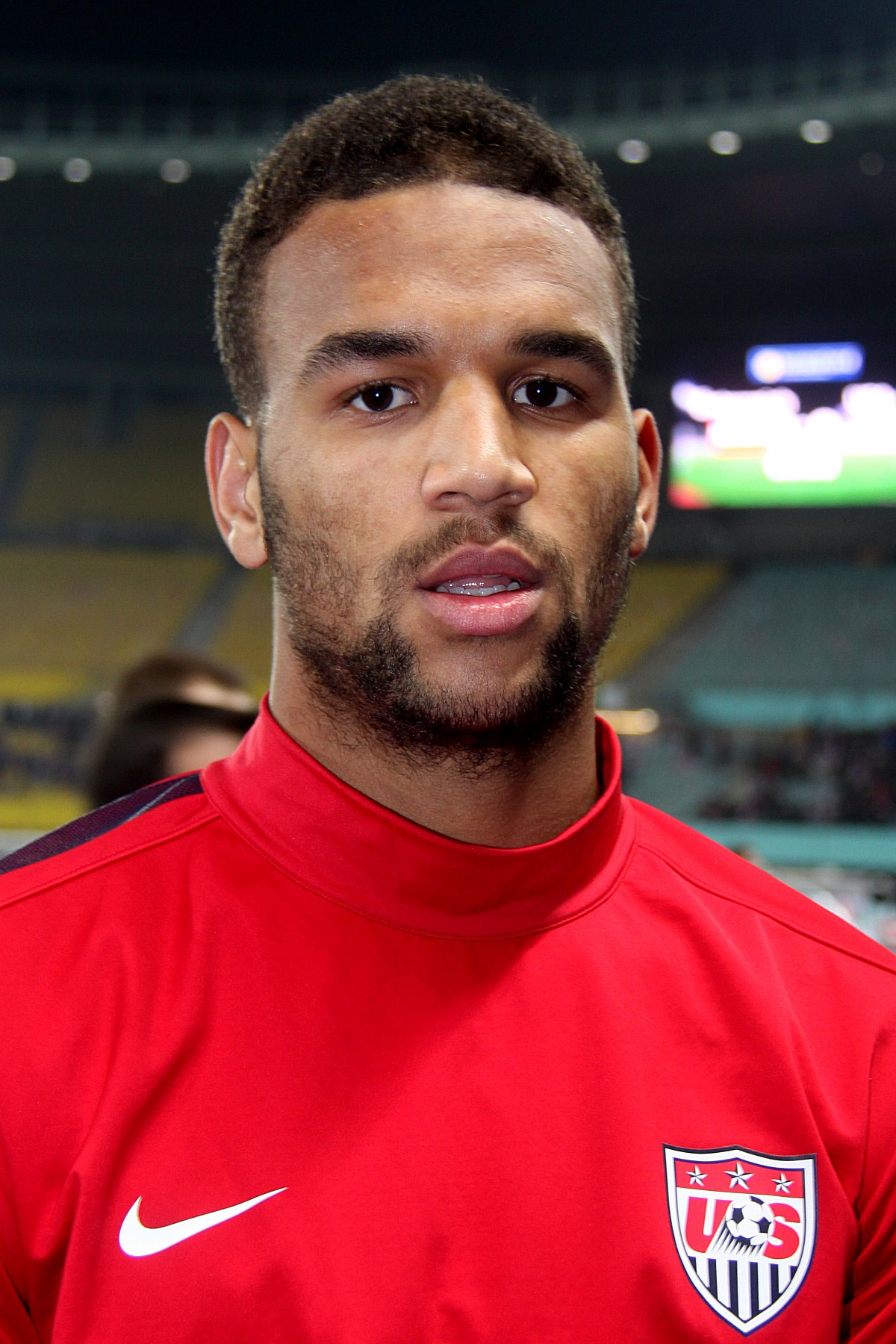
Boyd for U.S. National Team against Austria in 2013

Boyd was called to the U-23 Olympic Qualifying squad in March 2012. He scored two goals in the U-23 team's must-win game against El Salvador, but a late goal conceded sent the team out of the tournament in the group stage.

On May 20, Boyd was announced as one of the final additions to the U.S. squad for a five-game series set to culminate in two 2014 FIFA World Cup qualification matches. On May 26, he earned his first start ever for the United States in a 5–1 win against Scotland. He cemented his status as an American in international soccer by playing in the FIFA World Cup qualifier on June 8, 2012, against Antigua and Barbuda.

Later in 2012, Boyd played a major role in a landmark result for the U.S. in a friendly match against Mexico at the Estadio Azteca. His back heel allowed Michael Orozco Fiscal to score the only goal of the match, the United States' first ever victory at the stadium.

Boyd was included on Jürgen Klinsmann's 30-man preliminary roster for the 2014 FIFA World Cup; however, he did not make the final 23-man roster for Brazil.

Boyd has affirmed his commitment to the USMNT by getting a tattoo of the American flag on his arm.

== Career statistics ==
=== Club ===
As of match played on November 12, 2022

Appearances and goals by club, season and competition
Club	Season	League			National cup (Note: Includes DFB-Pokal, Austrian Cup)		Continental		Total	
Club	Season	Division	Apps	Goals	Apps	Goals	Apps	Goals	Apps	Goals
Hertha BSC II	2008–09	Regionalliga Nord	8	2	—		—		8	2
Hertha BSC II	2009–10	Regionalliga Nord	4	0	—		—		4	0
Hertha BSC II	2010–11	Regionalliga Nord	32	13	—		—		32	13
Hertha BSC II	Total		44	15	—		—		44	15
Borussia Dortmund	2011–12	Bundesliga	0	0	0	0	0	0	0	0
Borussia Dortmund II	2011–12	Regionalliga West	32	20	—		—		32	20
Rapid Wien	2012–13	Austrian Bundesliga	30	13	3	1	9 (Note: Appearances in UEFA Europa League)	3	42	17
Rapid Wien	2013–14	Austrian Bundesliga	29	15	1	0	8	5	38	20
Rapid Wien	Total		59	28	4	1	17	8	80	37
RB Leipzig	2014–15	2. Bundesliga	7	2	1	1	—		8	3
RB Leipzig	2015–16	2. Bundesliga	0	0	0	0	—		0	0
RB Leipzig	2016–17	Bundesliga	0	0	0	0	—		0	0
RB Leipzig	Total		7	2	1	1	—		8	3
RB Leipzig II	2016–17	Regionalliga Nordost	9	5	—		—		9	5
Darmstadt 98	2016–17	Bundesliga	7	1	0	0	—		7	1
Darmstadt 98	2017–18	2. Bundesliga	24	4	0	0	—		24	4
Darmstadt 98	2018–19	2. Bundesliga	11	0	2	0	—		13	0
Darmstadt 98	Total		42	5	2	0	—		44	5
Toronto FC	2019	MLS	11	0	0	0	2 (Note: Appearances in CONCACAF Champions League)	0	13	0
Hallescher FC	2019–20	3. Liga	33	14	1	0	—		34	14
Hallescher FC	2020–21	3. Liga	35	18	0	0	—		13	18
Hallescher FC	2021–22	3. Liga	17	7	0	0	—		17	7
Hallescher FC	Total		85	39	1	0	—		86	39
1. FC Kaiserslautern	2021–22	3. Liga	13	9	1	0	—		14	9
1. FC Kaiserslautern	2022–23	2. Bundesliga	17	8	1	0	—		18	8
1. FC Kaiserslautern	Total		30	17	2	0	—		32	17
Career total			306	122	9	2	19	8	334	132

=== International ===
As of October 11, 2016

Appearances and goals by national team and year
National team	Year	Apps	Goals
United States
United States	2012	7	0
United States	2013	5	0
United States	2014	1	0
United States	2015	0	0
United States	2016	1	0
Total		14	0
