= Dominik Wydra =

Austrian footballer (born 1994)

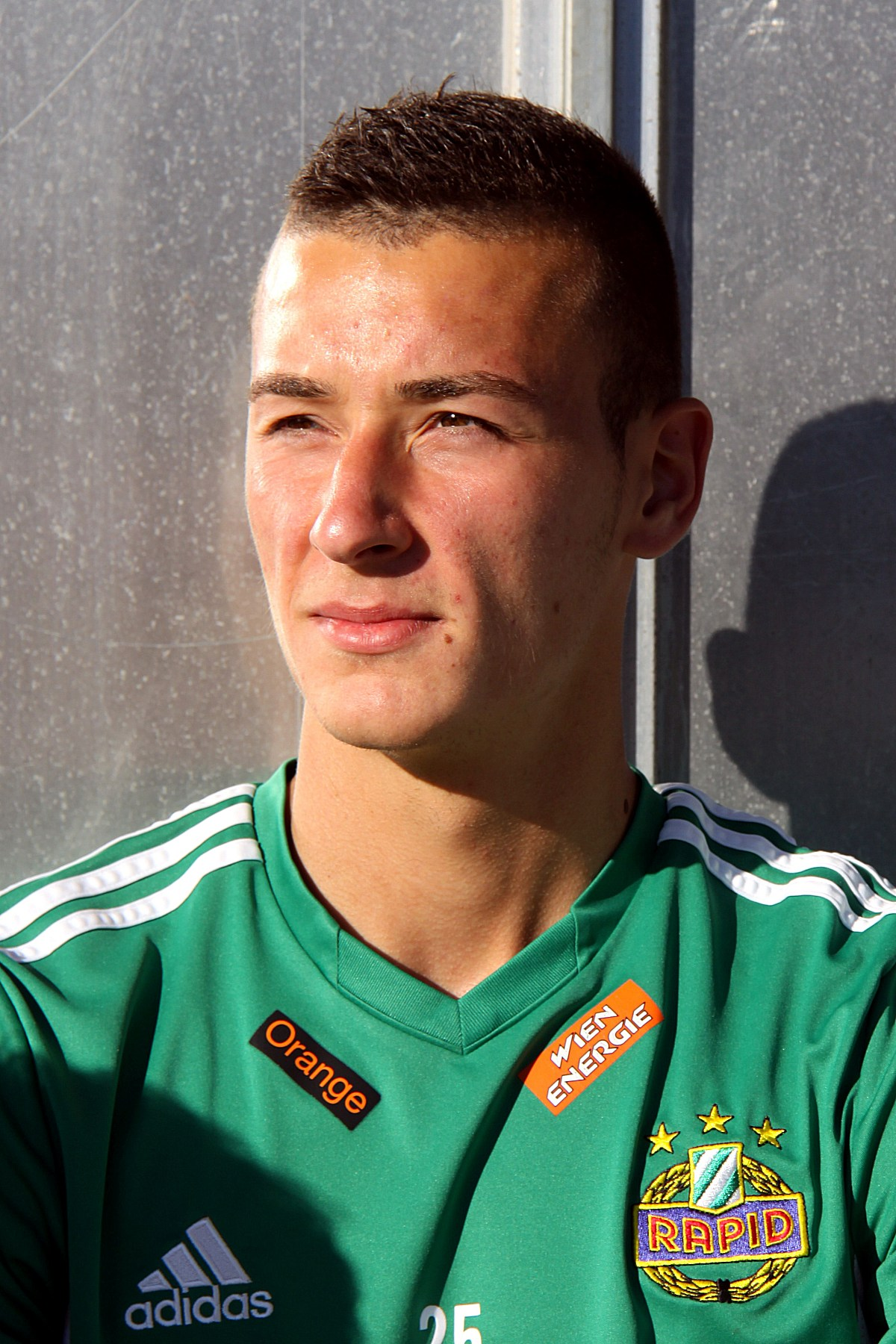
- Wydra with Rapid Wien in May 2013

Personal information
- Date of birth: 21 March 1994 (age 32)
- Place of birth: Vienna, Austria
- Height: 1.85 m (6 ft 1 in)
- Position: Midfielder

Team information
- Current team: ASV Siegendorf
- Number: 6

Youth career
- 2001–2003: SC Wiener Viktoria
- 2003–2011: Rapid Wien

Senior career*
Years	Team	Apps	(Gls)
2011–2015	Rapid Wien II	45	(11)
2012–2015	Rapid Wien	57	(2)
2015–2016	SC Paderborn	24	(0)
2016–2017	VfL Bochum	13	(1)
2017–2020	Erzgebirge Aue	56	(1)
2020–2021	Eintracht Braunschweig	28	(0)
2021–2022	Raków Częstochowa	3	(0)
2023–	ASV Siegendorf	30	(1)

International career
2009–2010	Austria U16	6	(1)
2010–2011	Austria U17	7	(1)
2011–2012	Austria U18	2	(1)
2011–2013	Austria U19	7	(0)
2014–2016	Austria U21	14	(2)
- * Club domestic league appearances and goals as of 21 March 2024

Dominik Wydra (Polish pronunciation: [dɔˈminik ˈvɨdra]; born 21 March 1994) is an Austrian professional footballer who plays as a midfielder for ASV Siegendorf.

== International career ==
Wydra has represented various Austrian youth national teams, and was captain of the U21 Austrian team. He is of Polish descent, and in December 2016 declared he wanted to represent Poland internationally.

== Career statistics ==
As of 24 August 2020

Appearances and goals by club, season and competition
Club	Season	League			Cup		Continental		Total	
Club	Season	Division	Apps	Goals	Apps	Goals	Apps	Goals	Apps	Goals
Rapid Wien II	2010–11	Regionalliga Ost	6	0	0	0	—		6	0
Rapid Wien II	2011–12	Regionalliga Ost	23	5	3	0	—		26	5
Rapid Wien II	2012–13	Regionalliga Ost	11	2	—		—		11	2
Rapid Wien II	2013–14	Regionalliga Ost	3	4	—		—		3	4
Rapid Wien II	2014–15	Regionalliga Ost	2	0	—		—		2	0
Rapid Wien II	Total		45	11	3	0	0	0	48	11
Rapid Wien	2011–12	Bundesliga	2	0	0	0	—		2	0
Rapid Wien	2012–13	Bundesliga	17	1	1	0	3	0	21	1
Rapid Wien	2013–14	Bundesliga	20	1	1	0	0	0	21	1
Rapid Wien	2014–15	Bundesliga	18	0	2	0	2	1	22	1
Rapid Wien	2015–16	Bundesliga	0	0	1	0	0	0	1	0
Rapid Wien	Total		57	2	5	0	5	1	67	3
SC Paderborn	2015–16	2. Bundesliga	24	0	2	0	—		26	0
VfL Bochum	2016–17	2. Bundesliga	13	1	0	0	—		13	1
Erzgebirge Aue	2017–18	2. Bundesliga	29	1	1	0	—		30	1
Erzgebirge Aue	2018–19	2. Bundesliga	22	0	1	0	—		23	0
Erzgebirge Aue	2019–20	2. Bundesliga	5	0	0	0	—		5	0
Erzgebirge Aue	Total		56	1	2	0	0	0	58	1
Career total			195	15	12	0	5	1	212	16
