= Brian Behrendt =

German footballer (born 1991)

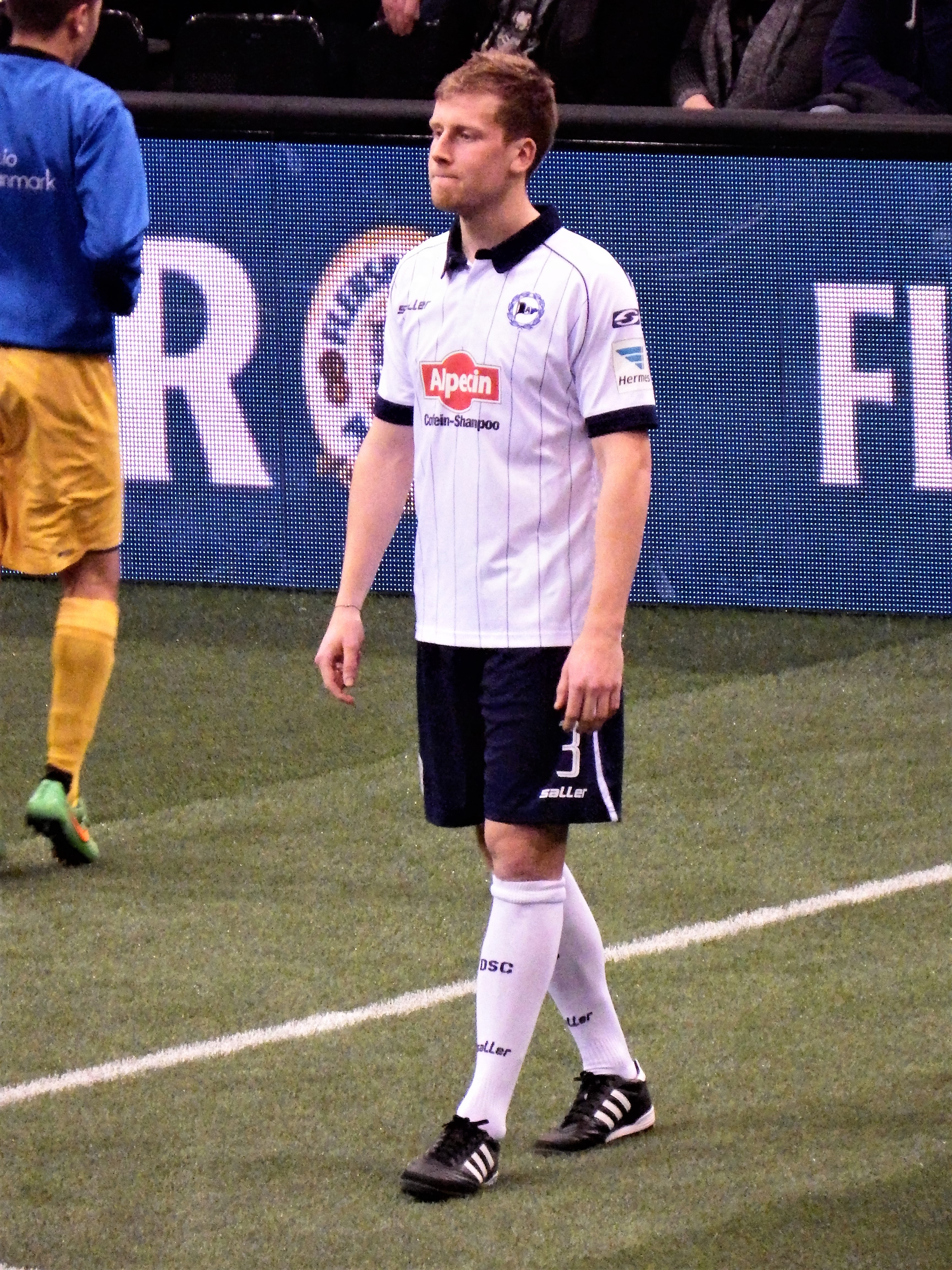
- Behrendt with Arminia Bielefeld in 2017

Personal information
- Date of birth: 24 October 1991 (age 35)
- Place of birth: Bremervörde, Germany
- Height: 1.87 m (6 ft 2 in)
- Positions: Centre back; defensive midfielder

Team information
- Current team: FSV Schöningen
- Number: 3

Youth career
- –2004: Bremervörder SC
- 2004–2006: TuS Heeslingen
- 2006–2008: Hamburger SV
- 2008–2010: Rapid Wien

Senior career*
Years	Team	Apps	(Gls)
2010–2015	Rapid Wien II	68	(7)
2012–2015	Rapid Wien	40	(1)
2013	→ SV Horn (loan)	17	(0)
2015–2021	Arminia Bielefeld	112	(4)
2021–2024	Eintracht Braunschweig	71	(1)
2024	Hallescher FC	12	(0)
2024–2025	Stuttgarter Kickers	21	(0)
2025–	FSV Schöningen	33	(1)
- * Club domestic league appearances and goals as of 22 September 2026

Brian Behrendt (born 24 October 1991) is a German professional footballer who plays as a centre-back for Regionalliga club FSV Schöningen.

== Career ==
Behrendt started playing football with local clubs Bremervörder SC and TuS Heeslingen. In 2006, he joined the youth ranks of Northern German heavyweight Hamburger SV, but switched to Rapid Wien at the age of 16 when his father moved to Austria for work. He advanced through the club's youth system and made his debut for the second team in a 3–0 win against SV Mattersburg II in Regional League East on 5 March 2010. He joined First League side SV Horn on loan in January 2013 for the remainder of the 2012–13 season.

After returning to Rapid Wien, Behrendt made his first-team debut as an extra-time substitute in an Austrian Cup penalty shootout defeat to LASK Linz on 14 July 2013. He missed most of the 2014–15 season with a broken metatarsal, and he joined Arminia Bielefeld in July 2015.

In December 2020 it was announced Behrendt would move to Eintracht Braunschweig in January 2021, having agreed a contract until summer 2023.

On 8 January 2024, Behrendt moved to Hallescher FC in 3. Liga.

== Career statistics ==
=== Club ===
As of 8 August 2024

Appearances and goals by club, season and competition
Club	Season	League			National Cup		Continental		Total	
Club	Season	Division	Apps	Goals	Apps	Goals	Apps	Goals	Apps	Goals
Rapid Wien II	2010-11	Austrian Regionalliga	27	3	—		—		27	3
Rapid Wien II	2011-12	Austrian Regionalliga	24	2	2	0	—		26	2
Rapid Wien II	2012-13	Austrian Regionalliga	10	1	—		—		10	1
Rapid Wien II	2014-15	Austrian Regionalliga	3	1	—		—		3	1
Rapid Wien II	Total		64	7	2	0	—		66	7
Rapid Wien	2011-12	Austrian Bundesliga	0	0	—		—		0	0
Rapid Wien	2012-13	Austrian Bundesliga	0	0	—		0	0	0	0
Rapid Wien	2013-14	Austrian Bundesliga	30	1	1	0	10 (Note: Appearance(s) in UEFA Europa League)	1	41	2
Rapid Wien	2014-15	Austrian Bundesliga	10	0	1	0	2	0	13	0
Rapid Wien	Total		40	1	2	0	12	1	54	2
SV Horn (loan)	2012-13	2. Liga	17	0	—		—		17	0
Arminia Bielefeld	2015-16	2. Bundesliga	28	2	0	0	—		28	2
Arminia Bielefeld	2016-17	2. Bundesliga	29	1	2	0	—		31	1
Arminia Bielefeld	2017-18	2. Bundesliga	19	1	1	0	—		20	1
Arminia Bielefeld	2018-19	2. Bundesliga	26	0	1	0	—		27	0
Arminia Bielefeld	2019-20	2. Bundesliga	7	0	1	0	—		8	0
Arminia Bielefeld	2020-21	Bundesliga	3	0	0	0	—		2	0
Arminia Bielefeld	Total		112	4	5	0	—		117	4
Eintracht Braunschweig	2020-21	2. Bundesliga	15	0	—		—		15	0
Eintracht Braunschweig	2021-22	3. Liga	34	1	1	0	—		35	1
Eintracht Braunschweig	2022-23	2. Bundesliga	16	0	1	1	—		17	1
Eintracht Braunschweig	2023-24	2. Bundesliga	6	0	1	0	—		7	0
Eintracht Braunschweig	Total		71	1	3	1	—		74	2
Hallescher FC	2023-24	3. Liga	12	0	—		—		12	0
Stuttgarter Kickers	2024-25	Regionalliga	2	0	—		—		2	0
Career Total			318	13	12	1	12	1	342	15
