= Thanos Petsos =

German-born Greek footballer (born 1991)

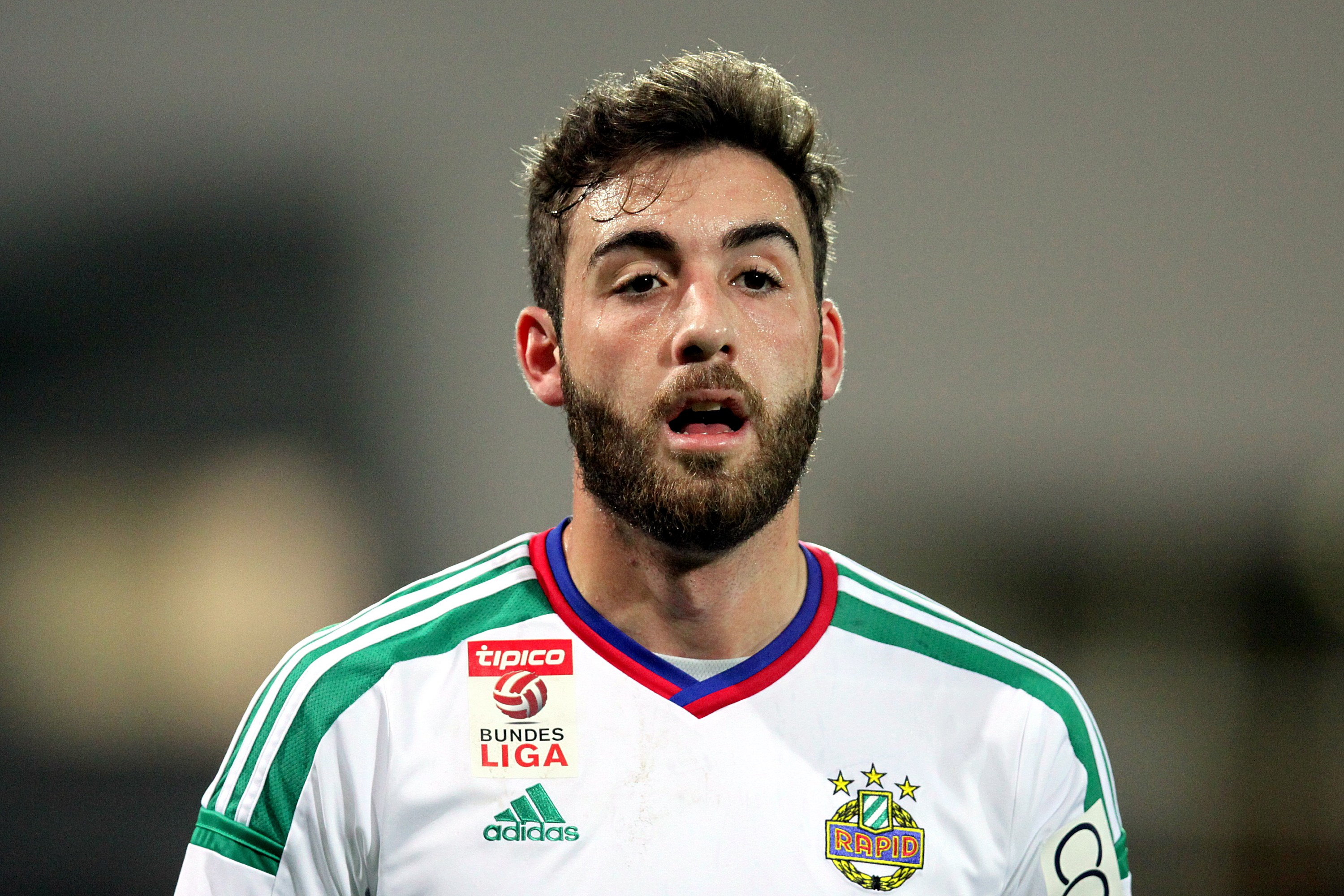
- Petsos with Rapid Wien in 2015

Personal information
- Full name: Athanasios Petsos
- Date of birth: 5 June 1991 (age 35)
- Place of birth: Düsseldorf, Germany
- Height: 1.84 m (6 ft 0 in)
- Position: Defensive midfielder

Youth career
- 1999–2001: Düsseldorf 99 SC
- 2001–2010: Bayer Leverkusen

Senior career*
Years	Team	Apps	(Gls)
2010	Bayer Leverkusen II	8	(0)
2010–2012	Bayer Leverkusen	1	(0)
2010–2012	→ 1. FC Kaiserslautern (loan)	39	(0)
2012–2013	Greuther Fürth	14	(1)
2013–2016	Rapid Wien	74	(5)
2016–2019	Werder Bremen	3	(0)
2017	→ Fulham (loan)	0	(0)
2017–2018	→ Rapid Wien (loan)	18	(0)
2020–2022	WSG Tirol	60	(4)
2022–2023	Riga	21	(0)

International career^{‡}
2007	Greece U17	1	(0)
2008–2010	Greece U19	7	(0)
2010–2012	Greece U21	5	(2)
2011–2016	Greece	4	(0)
- * Club domestic league appearances and goals as of 11:50, 9 November 2022 (UTC) ‡ National team caps and goals as of 23:14, 27 June 2019 (UTC)

Thanos Petsos (Greek: Θάνος Πέτσος; born 5 June 1991) is a Greek professional footballer who plays as a defensive midfielder.

== Club career ==
=== Early career ===
Petsos started his football career at the age of eight for Düsseldorf 99 SC. In 2001, he was lured away to professional club Bayer Leverkusen. He progressed through the youth system and was part of the team that finished runner-up in the Under 19 Bundesliga in 2010. He made his debut for the Leverkusen reserve team in March 2010. He made seven more appearances in the 2009–10 season while continuing to play for the under-19 team. He made his Bundesliga debut on 24 April 2010 against Hannover 96.

With a Leverkusen contract running until 2014, Petsos was loaned out to 1. FC Kaiserslautern for one season in 2010. He made his full Bundesliga debut for the club on 13 November 2010 against VfB Stuttgart being played as a right back. In April 2011, it was announced his loan to Kaiserslautern would be extended for the following 2011–2012 season. He made a total of 42 appearances for the club.

=== Greuther Fürth ===
In 2012, Petsos signed for newly promoted SpVgg Greuther Fürth on a three-year deal. He made his debut for the club on 18 August 2012 in a DFB-Pokal match against Kickers Offenbach, he then went on to make his Bundesliga debut on 31 August 2012 against Mainz 05. He went on to make a total of 15 appearances for the club.

=== Rapid Wien ===
On 15 July 2013, Petsos joined Austrian Bundesliga club Rapid Wien on a three-year agreement. He made his debut for the club on 27 July 2013 against Wiener Neustadt.

On 3 May 2015, in a 2–2 draw away to SK Sturm Graz he scored for 2–1 with a hard long-range shot.

On 4 August 2015, he greatly contributed to 3–2 away win with a strong performance in the third qualifying round of the 2015–16 UEFA Champions League against Ajax. In early September, he suffered an injury during training with the Greece national team keeping him out of action for several weeks. Rapid in October stated their intention to extend Petsos' contract after he had been one of the team's best players during its strong start to the season. On 18 October 2015, he returned to the team, starting in an Austrian championship game against Wolfsberger AC, but suffered an injury in the first quarter of the match. On 22 October 2015, in a UEFA Europa League 3–2 home game against Plzeň, he scored a long-range goal, giving his club a lead of two goals. In January 2016, he announced he would not accept Rapid's offer to renew his contract which was set to expire in summer 2016 and would instead leave the Austrian club after three years. He left the club having 101 appearances (7 goals, 6 assists) in all competitions.

=== Werder Bremen ===
A few days later Petsos signed a contract until summer 2019 with German club Werder Bremen. On 11 September 2016, he made his debut with the club as a substitute in a 2–1 home loss against Augsburg.

On 2 January 2017, besides his new contract, Werder Bremen announced that Petsos and Janek Sternberg would be able to train in the U23. "With the commitment of Thomas Delaney and the return of Florian Grillitsch, the competition for Thanos has become even bigger," said Managing Director Frank Baumann. "And Janek had a very limited amount of play in the preliminary round, and his situation is unlikely to change in the previous round, so they are now on the right track at U-23." Petsos fell out of favor with Alexander Nouri, not least because of his critical comments about the coach. Nouri had announced that he would like to take up a maximum of 25 field players to work intensively.

Having returned from his loan to Rapid Wien in summer 2018, Petsos spent the last year of his contract outside of the squad.

==== Loan to Fulham ====
Petsos joined Fulham on loan until the end of the 2016–17 season on 26 January 2017. Three days later, he made his Fulham debut as a substitute in an FA Cup tie against Hull City.

==== Loan to Rapid Wien ====
On 30 August 2017, Petsos returned to former club Rapid Wien, joining on loan for the 2017–18 season. Rapid Wien secured an option to sign him permanently from Werder Bremen.

=== WSG Swarovski Tirol ===
In January 2020, after being out of contract for half a year, Petsos joined WSG Swarovski Tirol, last in the Austrian Bundesliga table.

=== Riga ===
In February 2022, despite his contract with Tirol, Petsos will continue his career in Riga, for an undisclosed fee.

== International career ==
Petsos decided to represent the country of his origin Greece from youth level. He has played for the under-17 team, the under-19 team and the under-21 team.

On 5 August 2011, he was called up to the senior team for the first time by manager Fernando Santos for the friendly match against Bosnia and Herzegovina, and three days later he made his international debut. After almost four years, on 3 September 2015, he was called up from manager Kostas Tsanas for the Euro 2016 qualifier matches against Romania and Finland, but was injured in a training session of the national team. Following examination at the hospital, it was found he had suffered a partial rupture of the medial collateral ligament forcing him to be out of action for a month and to miss two matches of the national team, according to the Greek medical team.

== Style of play ==
Petsos is a technically proficient player who also contributes defensively. Born in Düsseldorf, he primarily plays as a central defensive midfielder, though in Germany he has also played as a right-back and a centre-back. His playing style includes a shooting technique.

== Honours ==
Riga FC

- Latvian Higher League: Runner-up 2022

Bayer 04 Leverkusen

- Bundesliga: Runner-up 2010–11
