= Ján Novota =

Slovak footballer and coach

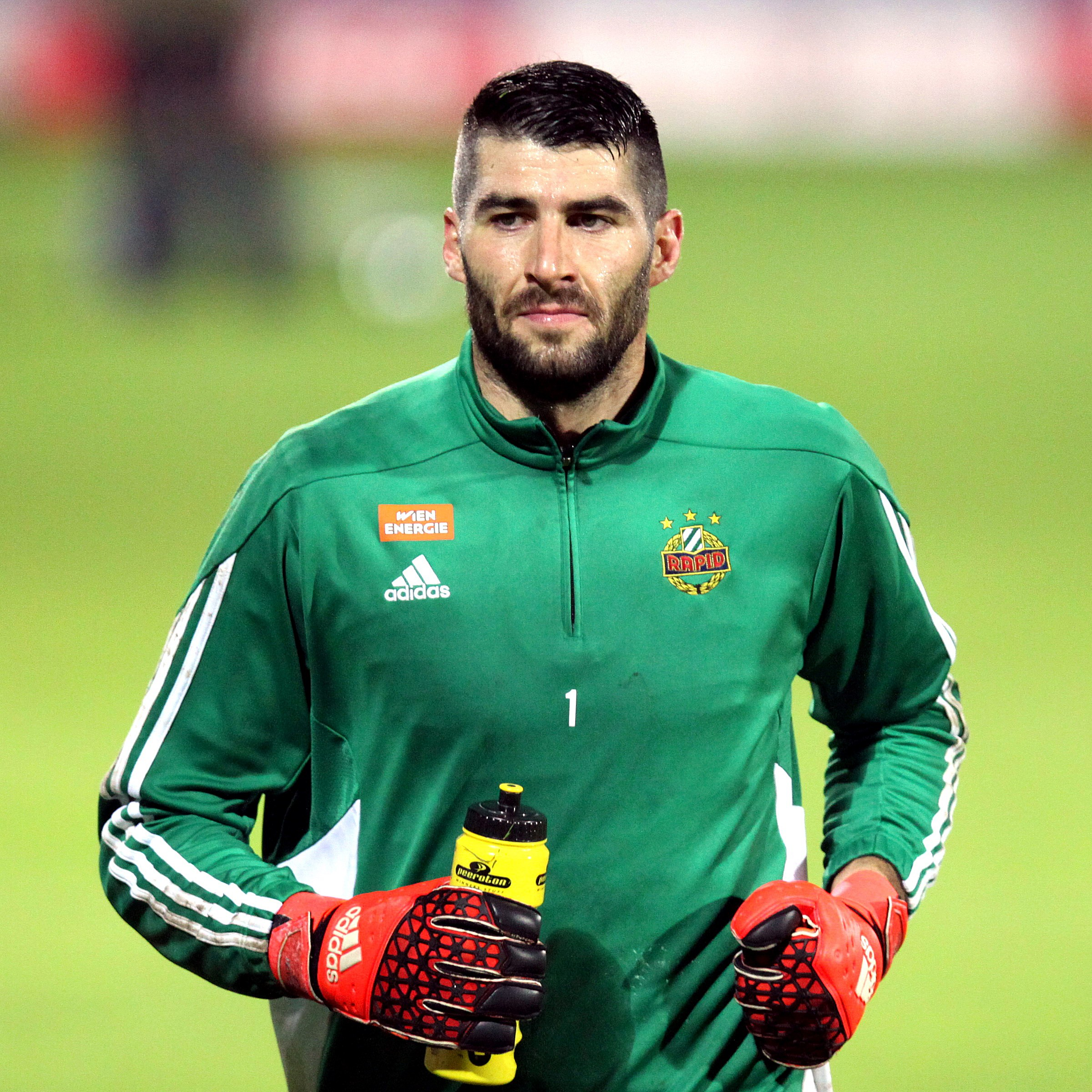
- Novota in 2015

Personal information
- Date of birth: 29 November 1983 (age 42)
- Place of birth: Matúškovo, Czechoslovakia
- Height: 1.99 m (6 ft 6 in)
- Position: Goalkeeper

Team information
- Current team: Slovakia (goalkeeping coach)

Youth career
- 1993–1997: OFC Matúškovo
- 1997–1999: Galanta
- 1999–2002: Senec

Senior career*
Years	Team	Apps	(Gls)
2002–2005	VTJ Štúrovo		
2005–2008	Senec	28	(0)
2008–2010	Dunajská Streda	53	(0)
2010	Panserraikos	0	(0)
2011	Dunajská Streda	15	(0)
2011–2017	Rapid Wien	96	(0)
2017	Debrecen	1	(0)

International career
2014–2017	Slovakia	4	(0)
- * Club domestic league appearances and goals

Ján Novota (Hungarian: Novota János; born 29 November 1983) is a Slovak former professional footballer who played as a goalkeeper. He currently works as a goalkeeping coach for the Slovakia national team.

A member of the Hungarian minority in Slovakia, Novota made his national team debut against Montenegro on 23 May 2014 (2–0 win), playing the second half of the friendly fixture. Later he was fielded in 3 additional friendly games against Iceland, Georgia and Austria, which was his last international cap on 15 November 2016. The only game he played for entire 90 minutes was against Iceland.

Novota was forced to retire from professional football on 5 February 2018 after suffering from aortic aneurysm, which caused his aorta to reach some 1.3 times the normal. His last competitive game was for Debrecen on 9 December 2017 in Round 19 of Nemzeti Bajnokság I against Diósgyőri.

In 2021, Slovak journalist of Hungarian ethnicity Titanilla Bőd published a biography of Novota titled by his surname.

In December 2022, he led a mid-season training camp in Senec for Slovak national team prospects under Francesco Calzona as the goalkeeper's coach, in place of his former national team partner Matúš Kozáčik. In March 2023, ahead of the first two UEFA Euro 2024 qualifiers, it was announced that Novota will replace Kozáčik as the goalkeeping coach of the national team permanently.
