= Michael Schimpelsberger =

Austrian footballer

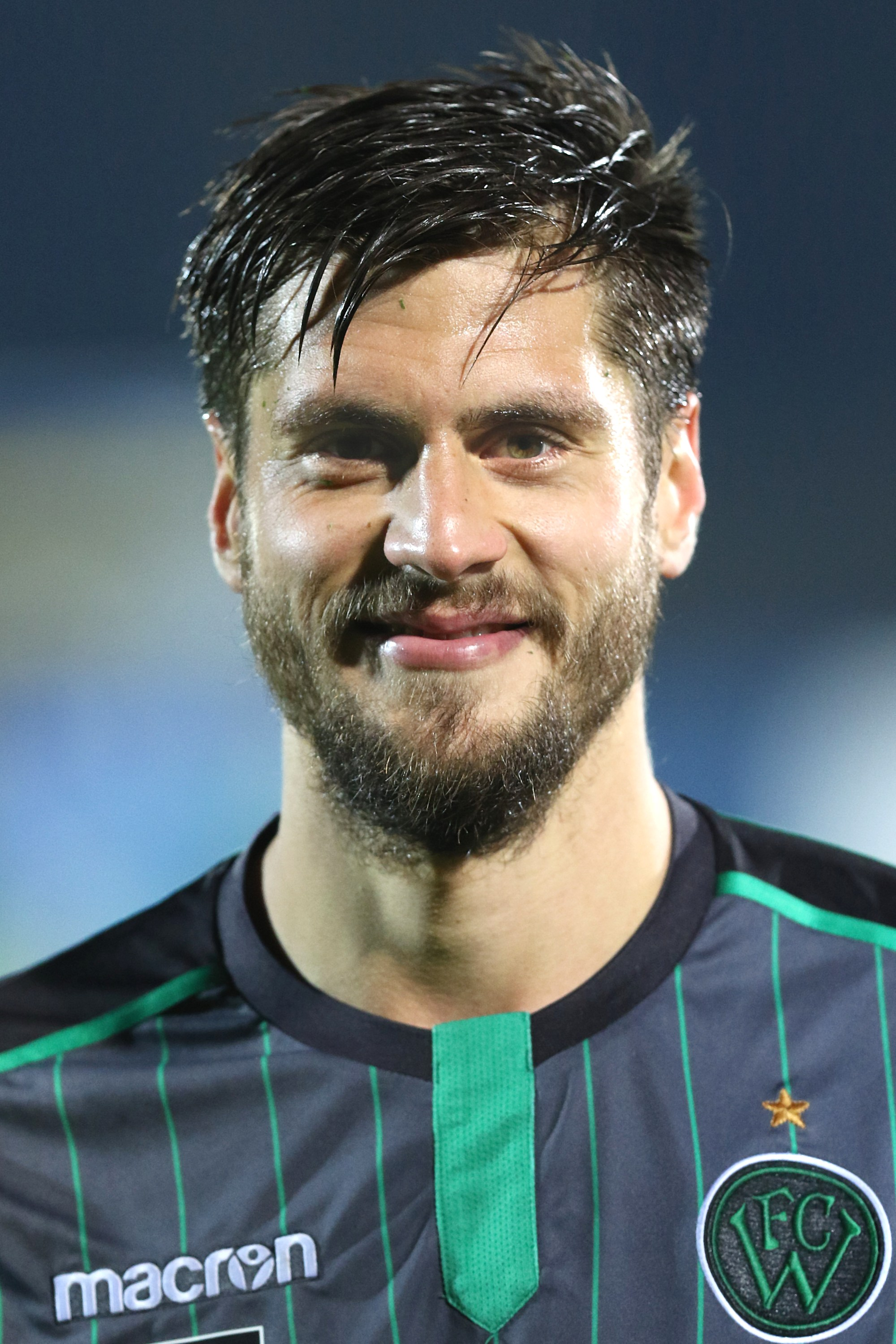

Personal information
- Date of birth: 12 February 1991 (age 35)
- Place of birth: Linz, Austria
- Height: 1.81 m (5 ft 11 1/2 in)
- Position: Left back

Youth career
- 2005–2006: Austria Wien
- 2006–2008: Red Bull Salzburg
- 2008–2011: Twente

Senior career*
Years	Team	Apps	(Gls)
2010	Twente	2	(0)
2011–2016	Rapid Wien	53	(0)
2016–2019	Wacker Innsbruck	70	(0)
2019–2020	St. Pölten	2	(0)

International career
2007–2008	Austria U17	11	(1)
2008–2009	Austria U18	3	(1)
2009–2010	Austria U19	10	(1)
2010–2012	Austria U21	8	(0)
2011	Austria U20	3	(0)
- * Club domestic league appearances and goals as of 4 July 2020

Michael Schimpelsberger (born 12 February 1991) is an Austrian professional footballer.
