= Thomas Schrammel =

Austrian footballer

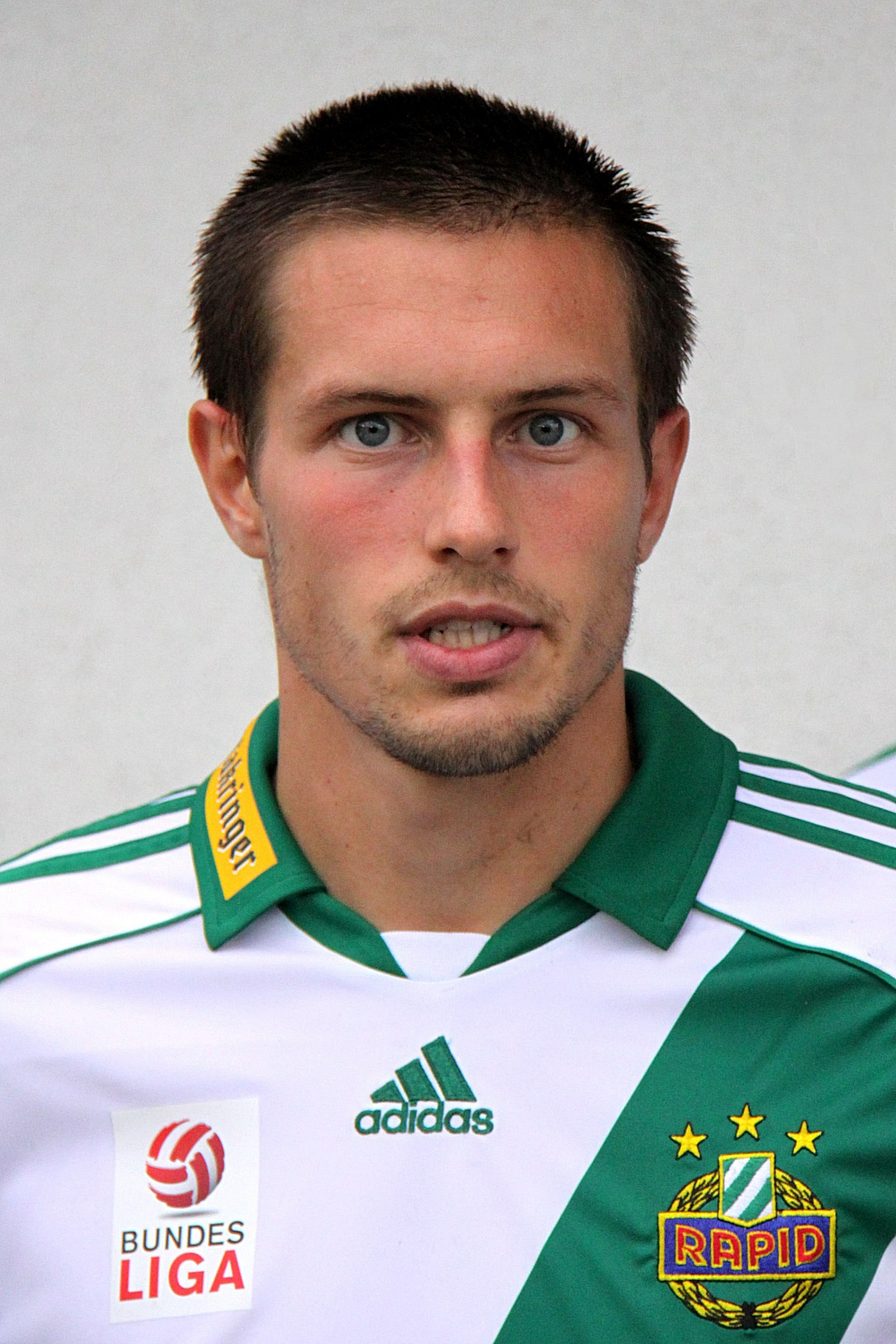

Personal information
- Date of birth: 5 September 1987 (age 39)
- Place of birth: Kittsee, Austria
- Height: 1.76 m (5 ft 9 1/2 in)
- Position: Left back

Senior career*
Years	Team	Apps	(Gls)
2006–2010	Rapid Wien	0	(0)
2007–2008	→ FC Lustenau (loan)	30	(0)
2008–2009	→ Wacker Innsbruck (loan)	22	(0)
2009–2010	→ Ried (loan)	30	(0)
2010–2011	Ried	34	(2)
2011–2018	Rapid Wien	128	(1)
2018–2020	Sturm Graz	40	(0)

International career^{‡}
2011	Austria	1	(0)
- * Club domestic league appearances and goals as of 5 July 2020 ‡ National team caps and goals as of 7 June 2011

Thomas Schrammel (born 5 September 1987) is an Austrian football player. He plays as a defender.
