= Eren (disambiguation) =

Eren is a Turkish name.

Eren or EREN may also refer to:

- Eren, Alaca, a village in Çorum Province, Turkey
- Eren-chan, a Japanese idol and singer-songwriter
- Eren Holding, a Turkish conglomerate
- Eren Yeager, the protagonist of the manga series Attack on Titan
- Erenhot, a city in Inner Mongolia, China
- Bitlis Eren University, a university located in Bitlis, Turkey
- Institute for Armenian Research, a Turkish think tank

== See also ==
- Aaron (disambiguation)
- Erin (disambiguation)
