= 2017–18 SK Rapid Wien season =

Rapid Wien
2017–18 season
- President: Michael Krammer
- Head Coach: Goran Djuricin
- Stadium: Allianz Stadion, Vienna, Austria
- Bundesliga: 3rd
- Austrian Cup: Semifinal
- Top goalscorer: League: Stefan Schwab (12); All: Giorgi Kvilitaia (13); Stefan Schwab (13)
- Highest home attendance: 26,000 vs. Austria Wien, 6 August 2017
- Lowest home attendance: 9,200 vs. SKN St. Pölten, 7 April 2018
- Average home league attendance: 19,100
Home colours	Away colours	Third colours

The 2017–18 SK Rapid Wien season was the 120th season in club history.

== Pre-season and friendlies ==
Date	Opponents	Venue	Result F–A	Goalscorers		Attendance
Date	Opponents	Venue	Result F–A	Rapid Wien	Opponent	Attendance
1 July 2017	Celtic	N	1–1	Joelinton 45. (pen.)	Dembélé 72. (pen.)	3,000
5 July 2017	Apollon Limassol	N	2–1	Joelinton 40. (pen.), Sobczyk 60.	Maglica 85.	750
9 July 2017	AS Monaco	H	2–2	Schwab 54., Thurnwald 71.	Lopes 15., Carrillo 52.	9,800
13 January 2018	FC Fastav Zlín	H	1–1	Mujakic 75.	Mehanović 28. (pen.)	250
18 January 2018	Beijing Renhe	N	4–2	Kvilitaia 14., Murg 41., Schobesberger 44., Joelinton 47.	Wang G. 27', 45+1'	
22 January 2018	CFR Cluj	N	1–3	Hofmann M. 68.	Mailat 3., Deac 78. (pen.), Costache 88.	
28 January 2018	1. FC Slovácko	H	1–1	Schwab 68.	Petr 29.	
23 March 2018	SC Wiener Neustadt	A	0–1		Prada 22.	400

== Bundesliga ==
=== Bundesliga fixtures and results ===
Win Draw Loss

MD	Date – KO	Opponent	Venue	Result F–A	Attendance	Goalscorers and disciplined players		Table			Ref.
MD	Date – KO	Opponent	Venue	Result F–A	Attendance	Rapid Wien	Opponent	Pos.	Pts.	GD	Ref.
1	22 July 2017 16:00	Mattersburg	H	2–2	17,800	Joelinton (red card) 23'; Auer 25'; Wöber 57'	Prevljak 74'; Maierhofer 79'	5th	1	+0	
2	29 July 2017 18:30	St. Pölten	A	4–1	6,139	Murg 37'; Kuen 42'; Petrovic 81' (o.g.); Keles 90+1'	Schütz 69'	2nd	4	+3	
3	6 August 2017 16:30	Austria Wien	H	2–2	26,000	Schaub 39' 55'; Schrammel (red card) 84'	Prokop 72'; Holzhauser 85' (pen.)	4th	5	+3	
4	13 August 2017 16:30	Admira Wacker Mödling	A	1–3	4,700	Joelinton 78'; Murg (red card) 90+2'	Jakoliš 1'; Starkl 63' 65'	5th	5	+1	
5	19 August 2017 16:00	Sturm Graz	H	1–2	20,200	Auer 60'	Alar 17'; Röcher 53'	7th	5	+0	
6	26 August 2017 18:30	LASK	H	1–0	19,400	Murg 22'		6th	8	+1	
7	10 September 2017	Red Bull Salzburg	A	2–2	12,250	Pavelić (red card) 16'; Ljubicic 60'; Schobesberger 79'	Schwab 75' (o.g.); Dabour 90+2'	7th	9	+1	
8	16 September 2017 16:00	Rheindorf Altach	A	2–2	5,500	Schwab 46'; Galvão 90+3'	Honsak 59'; Tekpetey 66'	8th	10	+1	
9	23 September 2017 16:00	Wolfsberger AC	H	4–2	20,600	Schwab 37' 45'; Murg 53'; Schobesberger 69'	Gschweidl 19'; Orgill 88'	4th	13	+3	
10	30 September 2017 18:30	Mattersburg	A	1–0	7,000	Schwab 29'		4th	16	+4	
11	14 October 2017 18:30	St. Pölten	H	1–0	24,200	Joelinton 41'; Murg (penalty missed)		3rd	19	+5	
12	22 October 2017 16:30	Austria Wien	A	1–0	14,200	Schobesberger 55'; Galvão (red card) 80'		3rd	22	+6	
13	28 October 2017 16:00	Admira Wacker Mödling	H	1–0	16,800	Schaub 26'		3rd	25	+7	
14	4 November 2017 16:00	Sturm Graz	A	0–0	15,600			3rd	26	+7	
15	18 November 2017 16:00	LASK	A	2–1	5,600	Murg 25'; Schwab 37'	Berisha 68'	3rd	29	+8	
16	26 November 2017 16:30	Red Bull Salzburg	H	2–3	25,300	Ljubicic 28'; Kvilitaia 76'	Hwang 45+2'; Ulmer 46'; Yabo 50'	3rd	29	+7	
17	29 November 2017 20:30	Rheindorf Altach	H	1–2	13,400	Schaub 72'; Petsos (red card) 76'; Bolingoli (red card) 90'	Aigner 77' (pen.) 90+1' (pen.)	3rd	29	+6	
18	2 December 2017 20:30	Wolfsberger AC	A	0–0	3,000			3rd	30	+6	
19	9 December 2017 16:00	Mattersburg	H	2–2	14,400	Joelinton 71'; Prosenik 87'	Okugawa 58'; Perlak 61'	3rd	31	+6	
20	16 December 2017 18:30	St. Pölten	A	5–0	3,669	Joelinton 32' (penalty missed) 85'; Schwab 35' (pen.) 90'; Berisha 54'	Rasner (yellow card) 81' (red card)	3rd	34	+11	
21	4 February 2018 16:30	Austria Wien	H	1–1	25,600	Ljubicic 64'	Monschein 62'	3rd	35	+11	
22	11 February 2018 16:30	Admira Wacker Mödling	A	1–2	3,200	Schobesberger 86'	Hausjell 69'; Pavelic 90+2' (o.g.)	3rd	35	+10	
23	17 February 2018 16:00	Sturm Graz	H	1–1	20,200	Bolingoli 88'	Röcher 20'	4th	36	+10	
24	24 February 2018 18:30	LASK	H	2–0	14,800	Kvilitaia 45' 69'		4th	39	+12	
25	4 March 2018 16:30	Red Bull Salzburg	A	0–1	11,981		Berisha 73'	4th	39	+11	
26	10 March 2018 16:00	Rheindorf Altach	A	0–0	5,193			3rd	40	+11	
27	17 March 2018 16:00	Wolfsberger AC	H	5–1	12,700	Kvilitaia 8' (pen.) 49' 89'; Berisha 25' 29'	Kvilitaia 79' (o.g.)	3rd	43	+15	
28	1 April 2018 16:30	Mattersburg	A	4–2	7,100	Schaub 17'; Murg 21' 37'; Schwab 28'	Pink 45'; Okugawa 85'	3rd	46	+17	
29	7 April 2018 18:30	St. Pölten	H	2–1	9,200	Kvilitaia 6' (pen.); Schwab 67' (pen.)	Vucenovic 75'	3rd	49	+18	
30	15 April 2018 16:30	Austria Wien	A	4–0	11,267	Schwab 8'; Murg 42'; Schobesberger 51'; Kvilitaia 73'		3rd	52	+22	
31	22 April 2018 16:30	Admira Wacker Mödling	H	4–1	18,600	Murg 39' 45+1'; Thurnwald 62'; Schwab 79'	Hausjell 81'	3rd	55	+25	
32	29 April 2018 16:30	Sturm Graz	A	2–4	14,573	Kvliltaia 40'; Murg 75'	Eze 3' 27'; Žulj 62'; Jeggo 72'	4th	55	+23	
33	5 May 2018 16:00	LASK	A	2–0	6,000	Kvilitaia 41'; Kuen 90+3'	Ramsebner (yellow card) 90+1' (red card)	3rd	58	+25	
34	13 May 2018 16:30	Red Bull Salzburg	H	1–4	22,300	Berisha 75'	Farkas 4'; Dabour 13' 82'; Gulbrandsen 26'	3rd	58	+22	
35	20 May 2018 16:30	Rheindorf Altach	H	4–1	21,600	Joelinton 6' 14'; Schwab 59'; S. Hofmann 73'	Grbic 45'	3rd	61	+25	
36	27 May 2018 17:30	Wolfsberger AC	A	0–0	4,639			3rd	62	+25	

=== League table ===
Pos	Team	Pld	W	D	L	GF	GA	GD	Pts	Qualification or relegation
1	Red Bull Salzburg (C)	36	25	8	3	81	29	+52	83	Qualification for the Champions League third qualifying round
2	Sturm Graz	36	22	4	10	68	45	+23	70	Qualification for the Champions League second qualifying round
3	Rapid Wien	36	17	11	8	68	43	+25	62	Qualification for the Europa League third qualifying round (Note: Sturm Graz qualified for the Europa League third qualifying round by winning the 2017–18 Austrian Cup. However, since they already qualified for European competition based on their league position, the spot awarded to the cup winners was passed down the league.)
4	LASK	36	17	6	13	49	41	+8	57	Qualification for the Europa League second qualifying round
5	Admira Wacker Mödling	36	15	6	15	59	66	−7	51	Qualification for the Europa League second qualifying round

Source: weltfussball.de (in German)
Rules for classification: 1) Points; 2) Goal difference; 3) Goals scored; 4) Matches won; 5) Away matches won; 6) Head-to-head points; 7) Head-to-head goal difference; 8) Head-to-head goals scored.
(C) Champions

=== Results summary ===
Overall								Home						Away					
Pld	W	D	L	GF	GA	GD	Pts	W	D	L	GF	GA	GD	W	D	L	GF	GA	GD
36	17	11	8	68	43	+25	62	9	5	4	37	25	+12	8	6	4	31	18	+13

== Austrian Cup ==
=== Austrian Cup fixtures and results ===
Win Loss Postponed

Round	Date	Opponent	Venue	Result F–A	Attendance	Goalscorers and disciplined players		Ref.
Round	Date	Opponent	Venue	Result F–A	Attendance	Rapid Wien	Opponent	Ref.
1st	16 July 2017 16:00	SC Schwaz	A	2–0	1,600	Auer 7'; Schwab 75'		
2nd	20 September 2017 20:30	Elektra Wien	A	4–0	4,000	Kvilitaia 19' (yellow card) 72' (red card); Schaub 51' 76' (pen.); Soura 84' (o.g.)		
R16	25 October 2017 20:30	Austria Wien	A	2–1	14,600	Murg 41'; Schobesberger 78'	Alhassan 51'	
QF	28 February 2018 20:30	SV Ried	H	2–1	7,200	Joelinton 75' (pen.); Kvilitaia 77'	Wießmeier 45+1' (pen.)	
SF	18 April 2018 20:30	Sturm Graz	A	2–3 (a.e.t.)	15,750	Schaub 58'; Kvilitaia 84'; Hofmann M. (yellow card) 120+2' (red card)	Edomwonyi 24' 62'; Eze 102'	

== Team record ==
Competition	First match	Last match	Record							
Competition	First match	Last match	M	W	D	L	GF	GA	GD	Win %
Bundesliga	22 July	27 May	36	17	11	8	68	43	+25	47.22
ÖFB Cup	16 July	18 April	5	4	0	1	12	5	+7	80.00
Total			41	21	11	9	80	48	+32	51.22

== Squad ==
=== Squad statistics ===
No.	Nat.	Name	Age	League		Austrian Cup		Total		Discipline		
No.	Nat.	Name	Age	Apps	Goals	Apps	Goals	Apps	Goals	Yellow card	(yellow card) (red card)	Red card
Goalkeepers
1	(Austria)	Richard Strebinger	24	35		3		38		1		
21	(Austria)	Tobias Knoflach	23	1		2		3		1		
Defenders
3	(Brazil)	Lucas Galvão	26	25+1	1	2		27+1	1	4		1
5	(Belgium)	Boli Bolingoli-Mbombo	22	26+2	1	3		29+2	1	1		1
6	(Austria)	Mario Sonnleitner	30	17+3		2+3		19+6		5		
17	(Austria)	Christopher Dibon	26									
20	(Austria)	Maximilian Hofmann	23	22+1		4		26+1		10	1	
22	(Austria)	Mario Pavelić	23	10+2		1		11+2		2		1
24	(Austria)	Stephan Auer	26	28+4	2	4	1	32+4	3	8		
31	(Turkey)	Mert Müldür	18	2				2				
38	(Austria)	Manuel Thurnwald	18	8+2	1	1+1		9+3	1	2		
Midfielders
7	(Austria)	Philipp Schobesberger	23	19+11	5	3	1	22+11	6	3		
8	(Austria)	Stefan Schwab	26	30+1	12	3	1	33+1	13	6		
10	(Austria)	Louis Schaub	22	24+6	5	2+2	3	26+8	8	2		
11	(Germany)	Steffen Hofmann	36	2+9	1	1+1		3+10	1			
18	(Hungary)	Tamás Szántó	21	1+5		1+1		2+6				
19	(Austria)	Thomas Murg	22	32+1	10	4+1	1	36+2	11	4		1
25	(Serbia)	Aleksandar Kostić	21	0+1		1		1+1				
26	(Croatia)	Ivan Močinić	24									
27	(Austria)	Andreas Kuen	22	4+3	2	0+1		4+4	2	1		
36	(Austria)	Kelvin Arase	18	0+1		1		1+1				
39	(Austria)	Dejan Ljubicic	19	27+1	3	3+1		30+2	3	7		
46	(Austria)	Armin Mujakic	22	0+4		0+2		0+6		1		
55	(Greece)	Thanos Petsos	26	12+6		3		15+6		4		1
Forwards
9	(Norway)	Veton Berisha	23	20+7	4	2		22+7	4	2		
13	(Georgia (country))	Giorgi Kvilitaia	23	18+11	10	2+1	3	20+12	13	5	1	
34	(Brazil)	Joelinton	20	19+8	7	3+1	1	22+9	8	6		1
Players who left after the start of the season
4	(Austria)	Thomas Schrammel	29	5		2		7		1		1
14	(Austria)	Maximilian Wöber	19	5	1	1		6	1			
33	(Austria)	Philipp Prosenik	24	1+4	1	0+1		1+5	1			
42	(Austria)	Eren Keles	23	3+5	1	1		4+5	1	1		
43	(Austria)	Alex Sobczyk	20	0+1				0+1				

=== Goal scorers ===
Name	Bundesliga	Cup	Total
(Georgia (country)) Giorgi Kvilitaia	10	3	13
(Austria) Stefan Schwab	12	1	13
(Austria) Thomas Murg	10	1	11
(Brazil) Joelinton	7	1	8
(Austria) Louis Schaub	5	3	8
(Austria) Philipp Schobesberger	5	1	6
(Norway) Veton Berisha	4		4
(Austria) Stephan Auer	2	1	3
(Austria) Dejan Ljubicic	3		3
(Austria) Andreas Kuen	2		2
(Belgium) Boli Bolingoli-Mbombo	1		1
(Brazil) Lucas Galvão	1		1
(Germany) Steffen Hofmann	1		1
(Austria) Eren Keles	1		1
(Austria) Philipp Prosenik	1		1
(Austria) Manuel Thurnwald	1		1
(Austria) Maximilian Wöber	1		1
Own goals
(Austria) Daniel Petrovic (St. Pölten)	1		1
(Austria) Yannick Soura (Elektra)		1	1
Totals	68	12	80

=== Disciplinary record ===
Name	Bundesliga			Cup			Total		
Name	Yellow card	(yellow card) (red card)	Red card	Yellow card	(yellow card) (red card)	Red card	Yellow card	(yellow card) (red card)	Red card
(Austria) Maximilian Hofmann	9			1	1		10	1	
(Austria) Stephan Auer	7			1			8		
(Brazil) Joelinton	6		1				6		1
(Austria) Dejan Ljubicic	7						7		
(Georgia (country)) Giorgi Kvilitaia	5				1		5	1	
(Austria) Stefan Schwab	4			2			6		
(Brazil) Lucas Galvão	4		1				4		1
(Austria) Thomas Murg	4		1				4		1
(Greece) Thanos Petsos	3		1	1			4		1
(Austria) Mario Sonnleitner	4			1			5		
(Austria) Mario Pavelić	2		1				2		1
(Austria) Philipp Schobesberger	3						3		
(Belgium) Boli Bolingoli	1		1				1		1
(Austria) Thomas Schrammel	1		1				1		1
(Norway) Veton Berisha	2						2		
(Austria) Louis Schaub	2						2		
(Austria) Manuel Thurnwald	1			1			2		
(Austria) Eren Keles	1						1		
(Austria) Tobias Knoflach	1						1		
(Austria) Andreas Kuen	1						1		
(Austria) Armin Mujakic	1						1		
(Austria) Richard Strebinger	1						1		
Totals	70		7	7	2		77	2	7

=== Transfers ===
==== In ====
Pos.	Nat.	Name	Age	Moved from	Type	Transfer Window	Contract ends	Ref.
FW	(Austria)	Philipp Prosenik	24	(Austria) Wolfsberger AC	Loan return	Summer	2018	
DF	(Belgium)	Boli Bolingoli-Mbombo	22	(Belgium) Club Brugge KV	Transfer	Summer	2020	
DF	(Brazil)	Lucas Galvão	26	(Austria) SCR Altach	Transfer	Summer	2020	
MF	(Greece)	Thanos Petsos	26	(Germany) Werder Bremen	Loan	Summer	2018	
FW	(Norway)	Veton Berisha	23	(Germany) Greuther Fürth	Transfer	Summer	2020	

==== Out ====
Pos.	Nat.	Name	Age	Moved to	Type	Transfer Window	Ref.
FW	(Spain)	Tomi Correa	32	(Spain) Atlético Victoria	End of Contract	Summer	
GK	(Slovakia)	Ján Novota	33	(Hungary) Debreceni VSC	Free transfer	Summer	
MF	(Iceland)	Arnór Ingvi Traustason	24	(Greece) AEK Athens	Loan	Summer	
DF	(Austria)	Christoph Schößwendter	28	(Germany) Union Berlin	Transfer	Summer	
FW	(Croatia)	Matej Jelić	26	(Croatia) HNK Rijeka	Loan	Summer	
DF	(Austria)	Maximilian Wöber	19	(Netherlands) AFC Ajax	Transfer	Summer	
FW	(Austria)	Alex Sobczyk	20	(Austria) SKN St. Pölten	Loan	Summer	
MF	(Austria)	Philipp Malicsek	20	(Austria) SKN St. Pölten	Loan	Winter	
FW	(Austria)	Philipp Prosenik	24	(Austria) SV Ried	Free Transfer	Winter	
DF	(Austria)	Thomas Schrammel	30	(Austria) Sturm Graz	Transfer	Winter	
MF	(Austria)	Eren Keles	23	(Austria) SKN St. Pölten	Transfer	Winter	
