= Aaron (disambiguation) =

Aaron is the brother of Moses in Jewish, Christian and Islamic texts.

Aaron or Aaron's may also refer to:

== Names ==
- Aaron (given name), name origin, variants, people, and fictional characters with the given name
- Aaron (surname), name origin, variants, and people with the surname

== Places ==
=== United States ===
- Aaron, Georgia, an unincorporated community
- Aaron, Indiana, an unincorporated community
- Aaron, Kentucky, an unincorporated community
- Aaron, Oklahoma, a ghost town
- Lake Aaron, a lake in Minnesota

=== Elsewhere ===
- Aaron, Malawi, a village on the shore of Lake Malawi

== Other uses ==
- Aaron (Book of Mormon city), a city located near Nephihah, according to the Book of Mormon
- Aaron (Nephite), a person in the Book of Mormon
- Aaron's, American lease-to-own retailer
- AARON, an artificial intelligence program
- AaRON (Artificial Animals Riding On Neverland), a French singing pop duet
- Teofilo Vargas Sein, religious leader nicknamed "Aaron" or "brother Aaron" by followers of the Mita religious congregations

== See also ==
- Aaron's beard, common name of several plants
- Aaron's rod (disambiguation)
- Aron (disambiguation)
- Erin (disambiguation)
- Y-chromosomal Aaron, the hypothesized most recent common male ancestor of many kohanim
