= Eren =

- Pronunciation: Turkish pronunciation: [æɾˈɛn] Kazakh pronunciation: [æɾˈɛn]
- Gender: Masculine
- Language: Turkish, Kazakh

Origin
- Origin: Proto-Turkic
- Derivation: er + -en
- Meaning: Saint, wise, brave, well-educated
- Region of origin: Turkey, Kazakhstan

Other names
- Variant forms: Erencan, Erenay, Erenalp, Erencem, Erenhan

Eren (Kazakh: Ерен) is a popular Turkish and Kazakh male name meaning "saint", "wise", "brave", and "well-educated". The name is Muslim and it's a reference to notable people in Islamic history.

Eren is also a Celtic name, denoting a few places in Scotland.

== Etymology ==
Eren derives from the Turkish word er, combined with the suffix -en. The word originates from the Proto-Turkic *ēr, meaning "man", which over time came to embody meanings such as "brave", "soldier", "tribesman" and "wise". Additionally, the name is an adjective derived from the verb ermek, meaning "to achieve", "to mature", "to attain sainthood" and "to be spiritually enlightened", thereby implying someone who has matured, achieved and attained a high level of wisdom, morality and spirituality.

Regarding the Celtic name Eren is shrouded in some obscurity. It has been used to signify a few villages in Scotland, including Auldearn and the river Invereren. Kinloss Abbey possessed a toft in a place named Eren, possibly Auldearn. The existence of several placenames, such as Findhorn ("White Eren"), Cullerne ("nook of Eren"), and Earnhill ("hill of Eren") implies that Eren used to be the name of a district in Scotland.

== Popularity ==
As of 2008, Eren ranked as the 36th most used male name in Turkey. By 2022, it was the 38th most commonly given name to baby boys in the country. As of 2023, Eren ranked as one of the top names (Kazakh: Ерен) in Kazakhstan.

== Given name ==
- Ali Eren Beşerler (born 1975), Turkish footballer
- Ali Eren Demirezen (born 1990), Turkish professional boxer
- Ali Eren İyican (born 1999), Turkish footballer
- Eren Albayrak (born 1991), Turkish footballer
- Eren Aydın (born 1982), Turkish footballer
- Eren Beyaz (born 1985), Turkish basketball player
- Eren Bilen (born 2000), Turkish footballer
- Eren Bülbül (2002–2017), Turkish civilian victim of PKK terrorism
- Eren Derdiyok (born 1988), Swiss footballer
- Eren Dinkçi (born 2001), Turkish-German footballer
- Eren Bali (born 1984), Turkish engineer and technology entrepreneur
- Eren Erdem (born 1986), Turkish writer and politician
- Eren Eyüboğlu (1913–1988), Romanian-born Turkish artist
- Eren Güngör (born 1988), Turkish footballer
- Eren Keles (born 1994), Austrian-Turkish footballer
- Eren Kinali (born 2000), English footballer
- Eren Keskin (born 1959), Kurdish lawyer and human rights activist in Turkey
- Eren Özen (born 1983), Turkish footballer
- Eren Ozker (1948–1993), American puppeteer
- Eren Ozmen (born 1958), Turkish-American businesswoman
- Eren Şen (born 1984), German-Turkish footballer
- Eren Taşkin (born 1992), German footballer
- Eren Tozlu (born 1990), Turkish footballer
- Evren Eren Elmalı (born 2000), Turkish footballer
- Muhammed Eren Kıryolcu (born 2003), Turkish footballer

=== Fictional characters ===
- Eren Yeager, the protagonist of the manga and anime series Attack on Titan (Shingeki no Kyojin)
- Eren Kruger, the namesake of Eren Yeager, after whom the protagonist was symbolically named by his father in the manga and anime series Attack on Titan

== Surname ==
- Efkan Eren (born 1989), Turkish basketball player
- Emrah Eren (born 1978), Turkish footballer
- Erdal Eren (1964–1980), Turkish far-left militant and execution victim
- Hasan Eren (1919–2007), Turkish linguist
- Hasibe Eren (born 1975), Turkish actress
- İbrahim Eren (born 1980), Turkish bureaucrat
- John Eren (born 1964), Turkish-Australian politician
- Mehmet Eren Boyraz (born 1981), Turkish footballer
- Semra Eren-Nijhar (born 1967), German-Turkish writer
- Tayfun Eren (born 1959), Australian politician
- Halil İbrahim Eren (born 1956), Turkish footballer
