= Erin's Isle (disambiguation) =

Erin's Isle refers to the island of Ireland.

Erin's Isle or Erins Isle may also refer to:

- Erins Isle (horse), a thoroughbred racehorse that competed in Ireland and the United States
- Erin's Isle GAA, a Gaelic games club in Finglas, Dublin
- HMS Erin's Isle, formerly PS Erin's Isle, a paddle steamer built in 1912

== See also ==
- Far From Erin's Isle, a 1912 American silent film
- Erin (disambiguation)
