= Mohamed Bzeek =

American humanitarian

Mohammed Bzeek
- Born: 1954 (age 71–72); Tripoli, Libya
- Citizenship: United States
- Occupations: Foster parent, humanitarian
- Known for: Fostering terminally ill and medically fragile children
- Spouse: Dawn Mellon Bzeek (died 2013)
- Awards: TRT World Citizen Award (2018)

Mohamed Bzeek (born in 1954) is an American foster parent and humanitarian known for fostering terminally ill and medically fragile children in the United States who are often considered difficult to place. He has received international recognition for providing end-of-life care and stable family environments to children with severe medical conditions. He received the TRT Citizen of the Year award in 2018.

== Early life and background ==
Mohamed Bzeek was born in Tripoli, Libya and later in 1978, he migrated to the United States to study engineering, where he settled at Azusa, California. He later met and married his wife, Dawn, in 1989. In 1997, he became a naturalized U.S. citizen.

== Foster care work ==
Bzeek began fostering children through the California foster care system after marrying his wife, Dawn Rowe Bzeek, who was also a foster parent. Following her death from cancer in 2013, Bzeek continued fostering children on his own. In addition, Bzeek also took care of his biological son, Adam, who suffers from dwarfism and osteogenesis imperfecta, also known as brittle bone disease.

He is particularly known for fostering terminally ill and medically complex children, many of whom are expected to live only for short periods and are often transferred between hospitals and care facilities. Bzeek has stated in interviews that his goal is to ensure that such children experience family life, dignity, and emotional comfort during their final months.

Unlike most foster placements, Bzeek typically cares for children who require intensive medical support, including feeding tubes, oxygen support, and round-the-clock care. He has fostered more than 80 children, with many remaining in his care until their deaths.

== Beliefs and caregiving approach ==
Bzeek is a Muslim, and his interfaith household has been noted in media coverage, particularly because some of the children he fostered came from Christian backgrounds. He has publicly stated that he respects and accommodates the religious beliefs of the children in his care, including arranging for religious observances when requested.

== In popular culture ==
Mohamed Bzeek was the subject of the documentary film Guardian of Angels (2018), produced by TRT World (Ibrahim Eren) and directed by Ensar Altay. The film documents Bzeek's work as a foster parent in Los Angeles caring for terminally ill and disabled children and received recognition at the International Istanbul Film Festival for its portrayal of compassion and selfless caregiving.
