= Andreas Kuen =

Austrian footballer

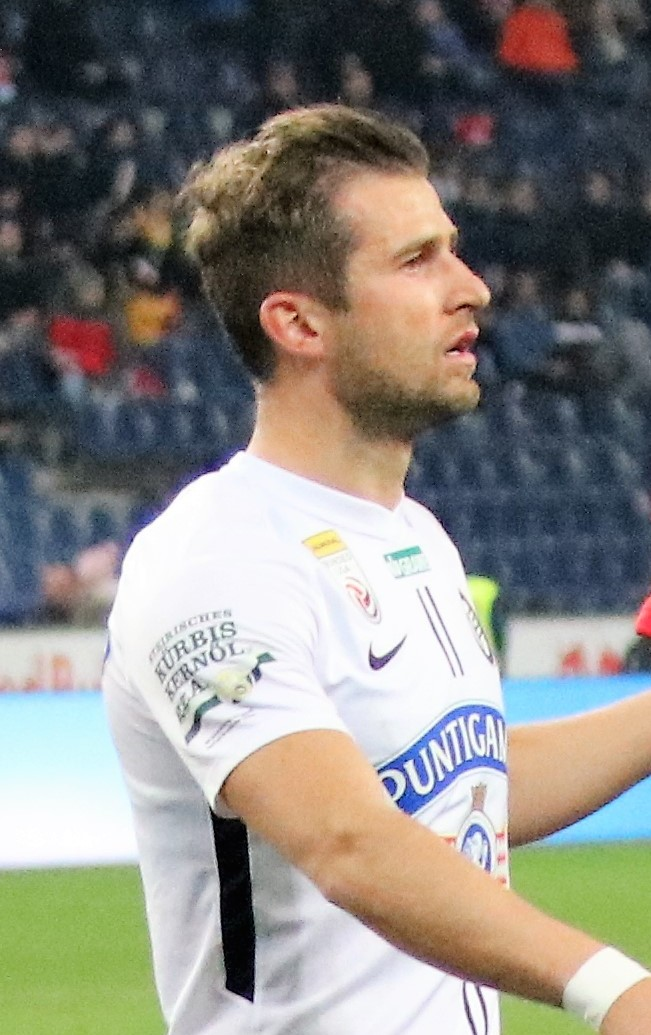
- Kuen in 2022

Personal information
- Date of birth: 24 March 1995 (age 31)
- Place of birth: Zams, Austria
- Height: 1.73 m (5 ft 8 in)
- Position: Central attacking midfielder

Youth career
- –2011: AKA Tirol

Senior career*
Years	Team	Apps	(Gls)
2012–2014	Wacker Innsbruck	13	(1)
2014–2018	Rapid Wien	17	(2)
2016–2017	→ Floridsdorfer AC (loan)	5	(0)
2018–2020	Mattersburg	39	(5)
2020–2022	Sturm Graz	60	(2)
2022–2024	Atromitos	46	(3)
2024–2026	Melbourne City	45	(5)

International career^{‡}
2011–2012	Austria U17	5	(0)
2012–2013	Austria U18	2	(0)
2013	Austria U19	1	(0)
- * Club domestic league appearances and goals as of 29 October 2025 ‡ National team caps and goals as of 01:09, 13 February 2015 (UTC)

Andreas Kuen (Austrian German: [ˈandɐe̯as ˈkyːn]; born 24 March 1995) is an Austrian professional footballer who most recently played as a right midfield for A-League club Melbourne City.

== Club career ==
Kuen made his league debut on 21 July 2012 in Austrian Bundesliga match against Rapid Wien.

On 8 August 2020, he signed a two-year contract with Sturm Graz.

On 21 June 2022, Kuen joined Atromitos until the summer of 2024.

Kuen joined Melbourne City ahead of the 2024–25 season. He scored his first goal for City in a 5–0 win against Perth Glory.

== International career ==
Kuen has represented his country at various age groups, most recently for the Austria national under-19 football team.

== Career statistics ==
As of 11 May 2024

Appearances and goals by club, season and competition
Club	Season	League			Cup		Continental		Other		Total	
Club	Season	Division	Apps	Goals	Apps	Goals	Apps	Goals	Apps	Goals	Apps	Goals
Wacker Innsbruck	2012–13	Austrian Bundesliga	2	0	0	0	—		—		2	0
Wacker Innsbruck	2013–14	Austrian Bundesliga	11	1	2	0	—		—		13	1
Wacker Innsbruck	Total		13	1	2	0	—		—		15	1
Rapid Wien	2014–15	Austrian Bundesliga	0	0	0	0	—		—		0	0
Rapid Wien	2015–16	Austrian Bundesliga	2	0	0	0	—		—		2	0
Rapid Wien	2016–17	Austrian Bundesliga	8	0	2	0	—		—		10	0
Rapid Wien	2017–18	Austrian Bundesliga	7	2	1	0	—		—		8	2
Rapid Wien	Total		17	2	3	0	—		—		20	2
Floridsdorfer AC (loan)	2016–17	2. Liga	5	0	1	0	—		—		6	0
Mattersburg	2018–19	Austrian Bundesliga	11	1	—		—		—		11	1
Mattersburg	2019–20	Austrian Bundesliga	28	4	1	1	—		—		29	5
Mattersburg	Total		39	5	1	1	—		—		40	6
Sturm Graz	2020–21	Austrian Bundesliga	31	2	5	1	—		—		36	3
Sturm Graz	2021–22	Austrian Bundesliga	29	0	2	2	6	0	—		37	2
Sturm Graz	Total		60	2	7	3	6	0	—		73	5
Atromitos	2022–23	Super League Greece	23	2	2	0	—		—		25	2
Atromitos	2023–24	Super League Greece	23	1	4	1	—		—		27	2
Atromitos	Total		46	3	6	1	—		—		52	4
Career total			180	13	20	5	6	0	0	0	206	18
