= Erin (disambiguation) =

Erin is the ancient Irish name for Ireland and is a common given name; including a list of persons and fictional characters with the name.

Erin may also refer to:

== Places ==
=== United States ===
- Erin, New York, a town in Chemung County
  - Erin (CDP), New York, a census-designated place in the center of the town of Erin
- Erin, Tennessee, a city in Houston County
- Erin, Jasper County, Texas
- Erin, Wisconsin
- Erin Lake, a lake in Minnesota

=== Elsewhere ===
- Erin, Ontario, in Wellington County, Canada
- Érin, a commune in the département of Pas-de-Calais, France
- Port Erin, a town, Isle of Man

== Music ==
- Erin Anttila (born 1977), Finnish singer known by mononym Erin
- "Erin", song by English guitarist Albert Lee

== Other ==
- Erin (Front Royal, Virginia), an historic home listed on the National Register of Historic Places in Virginia, United States
- Erin, a food brand owned by Valeo Foods
- Erin, a game by Alternative Armies based on the Invasion Cycle Myths of Celtic Ireland
- HMS Erin, a battleship of the Royal Navy
- List of storms named Erin
- Erin (color), a shade of green

== See also ==
- Aaron (disambiguation), male given name with a similar pronunciation
- Eren, Turkish name
- Edgars Eriņš (born 1986), Latvian decathlete and bobsledder
