= Tamás Szántó =

Hungarian footballer

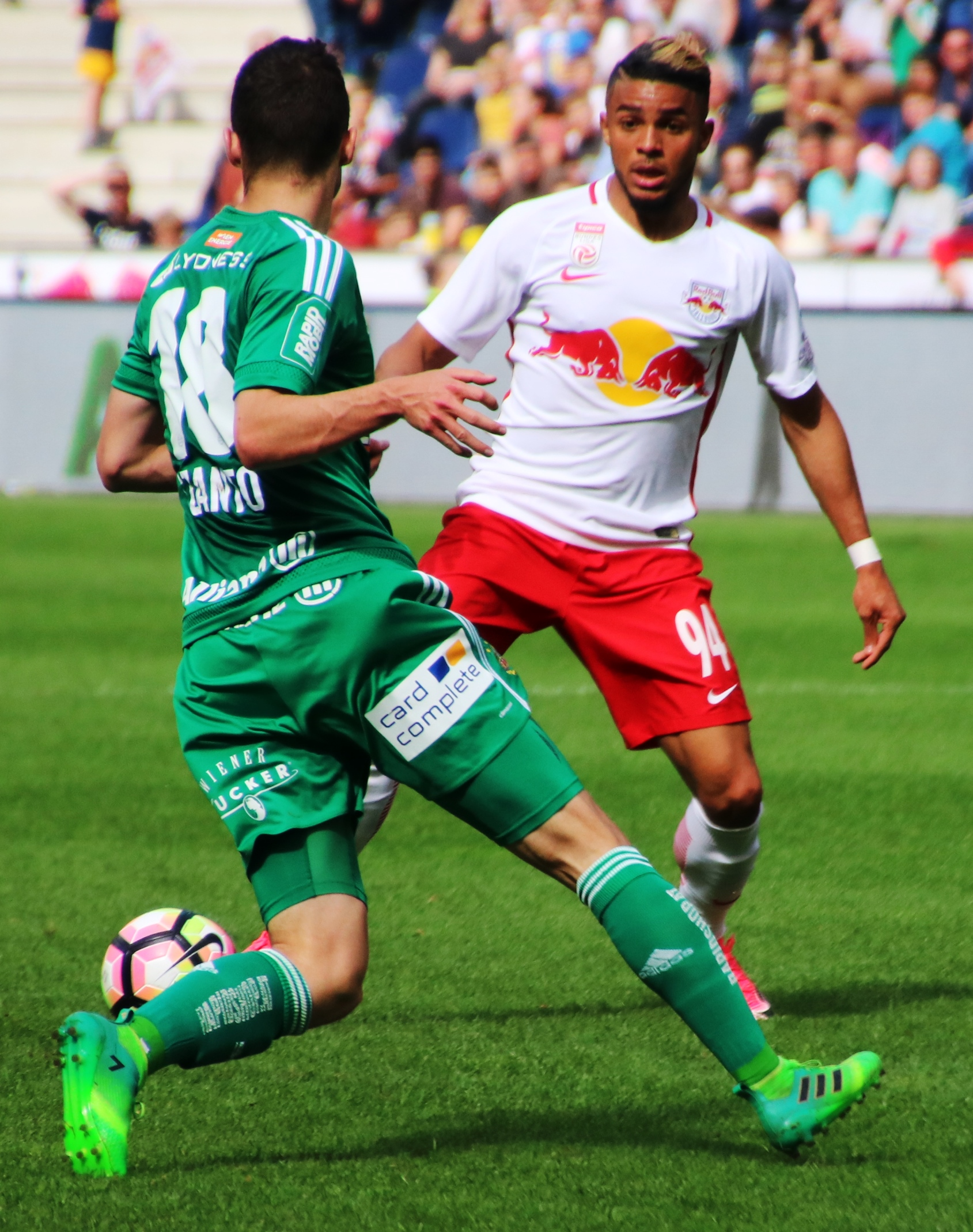
- Szántó in 2017

Personal information
- Date of birth: 18 February 1996 (age 30)
- Place of birth: Sopron, Hungary
- Height: 1.79 m (5 ft 10 in)
- Position: Attacking midfielder

Youth career
- 2003–2010: Sopron
- 2010–2014: Rapid Wien

Senior career*
Years	Team	Apps	(Gls)
2013–2016	Rapid Wien II	64	(19)
2016–2021	Rapid Wien	35	(5)
Total		99	(24)

International career
2012–2013	Hungary U-17	3	(0)
2014	Hungary U-18	1	(0)
2016	Hungary U-21	1	(0)
- * Club domestic league appearances and goals

Tamás Szántó (born 18 February 1996) is a Hungarian former professional footballer who played as an attacking midfielder.

== Club career ==
=== Early years ===
Szántó was born in Sopron while his father Csaba played for FC Sopron. His family is Székely from Târgu Mureș, Romania. He started to play football at the youth academy of FC Sopron before joining the youth academy of Rapid Wien in 2010.

=== Rapid Wien ===
Szántó made his Austrian Bundesliga debut on 31 July 2016, replacing Arnór Ingvi Traustason in the 63rd minute against Altach. His first appearance in the starting lineup came on 7 August 2016 against Austria Wien in the Vienna derby. Szántó scored his first league goal on 10 September 2016 against Sturm Graz in the 54th minute; that match ended in a 1–1 draw. He finished the 2016–17 season with total of 5 goals and 2 assists in 29 league appearances. His second season at Rapid was plagued by injuries, which limited his appearances and playing time.

=== Retirement ===
In April 2021, Szántó announced his retirement from playing at the age of 25 due to injury problems.

== International career ==
Szántó was named in Hungarian U-20 provisional squad for 2015 FIFA U-20 World Cup but was cut from the final squad. On 10 October 2016, he played his first match for the Hungary U-21 team.

== Career statistics ==
=== Club ===
Appearances and goals by club, season and competition
Club	Season	League			Austrian Cup		Europe		Other		Total	
Club	Season	Division	Apps	Goals	Apps	Goals	Apps	Goals	Apps	Goals	Apps	Goals
Rapid Wien II	2013–14	Regionalliga Ost	12	5	0	0	—		0	0	12	5
Rapid Wien II	2014–15	Regionalliga Ost	21	4	0	0	—		0	0	21	4
Rapid Wien II	2015–16	Regionalliga Ost	24	10	0	0	—		0	0	24	10
Rapid Wien II	2017–18	Regionalliga Ost	7	0	0	0	—		0	0	7	0
Rapid Wien II	Total		64	19	0	0	—		0	0	64	19
Rapid Wien	2016–17	Austrian Bundesliga	29	5	5	0	4	0	0	0	38	5
Rapid Wien	2017–18	Austrian Bundesliga	6	0	2	0	—		0	0	8	0
Rapid Wien	Total		35	5	7	0	4	0	0	0	46	5
Career total			92	24	7	0	4	0	0	0	103	24
