= Aaron's beard =

Aaron's beard may refer to the following plants having numerous stamens or threadlike runners:

- Cymbalaria muralis (Ivy-leaved toadflax, Kenilworth ivy), native to south and southwest Europe.
- Hypericum calycinum (Great St. John's-wort, Jerusalem star), widely cultivated.
- Opuntia leucotricha (Arborescent prickly pear, Aaron's beard cactus), a species of prickly pear cactus, endemic to Mexico.
- Saxifraga stolonifera (Creeping saxifrage, strawberry geranium), native to Asia.
- Spiraea salicifolia (Bridewort, willow-leaved meadowsweet), native to Eurasia, cultivated
- Verbascum thapsus (Great mullein, greater mullein, common mullein, Aaron's rod), native to Europe, northern Africa, and Asia.

The name derives from a Biblical quotation referring to the patriarch Aaron:

"Behold, how good and how pleasant it is for brethren to dwell together in unity!
It is like the precious ointment upon the head, that ran down upon the beard, even Aaron's beard: that went down to the skirts of his garments"
-- Psalm 133:1-2 (King James Version)

Plants named Aaron's beard
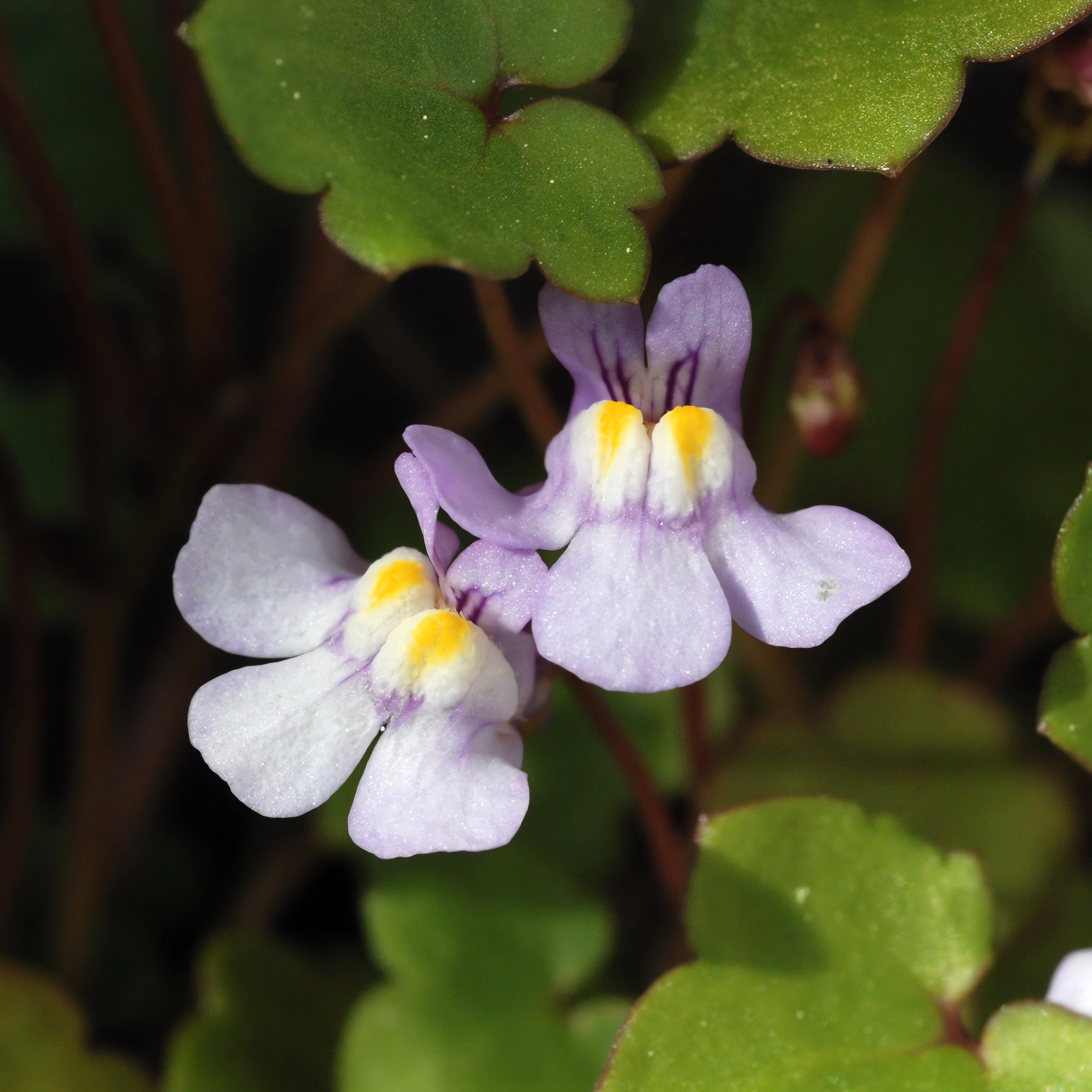
Cymbalaria muralis

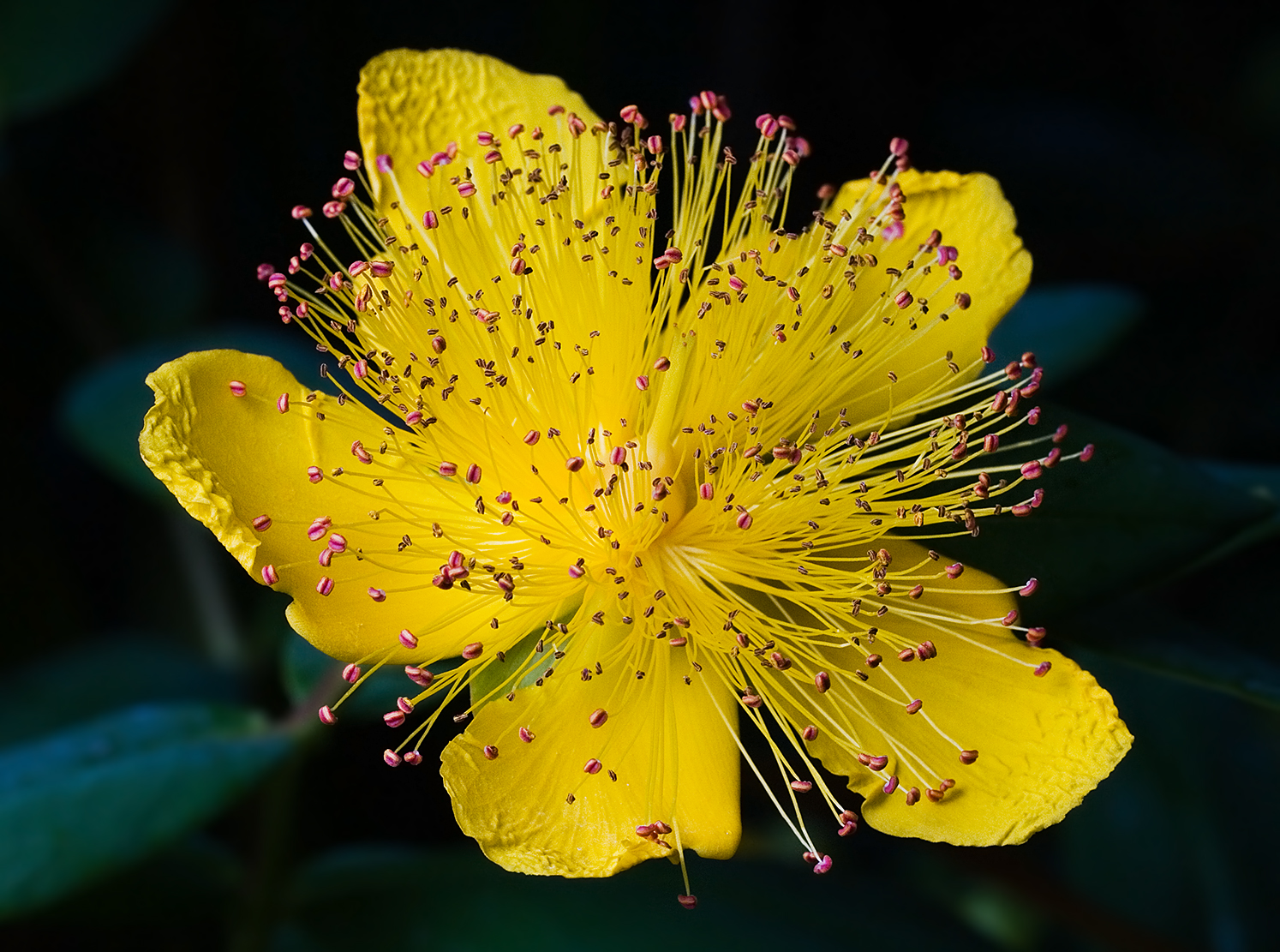
Hypericum calycinum

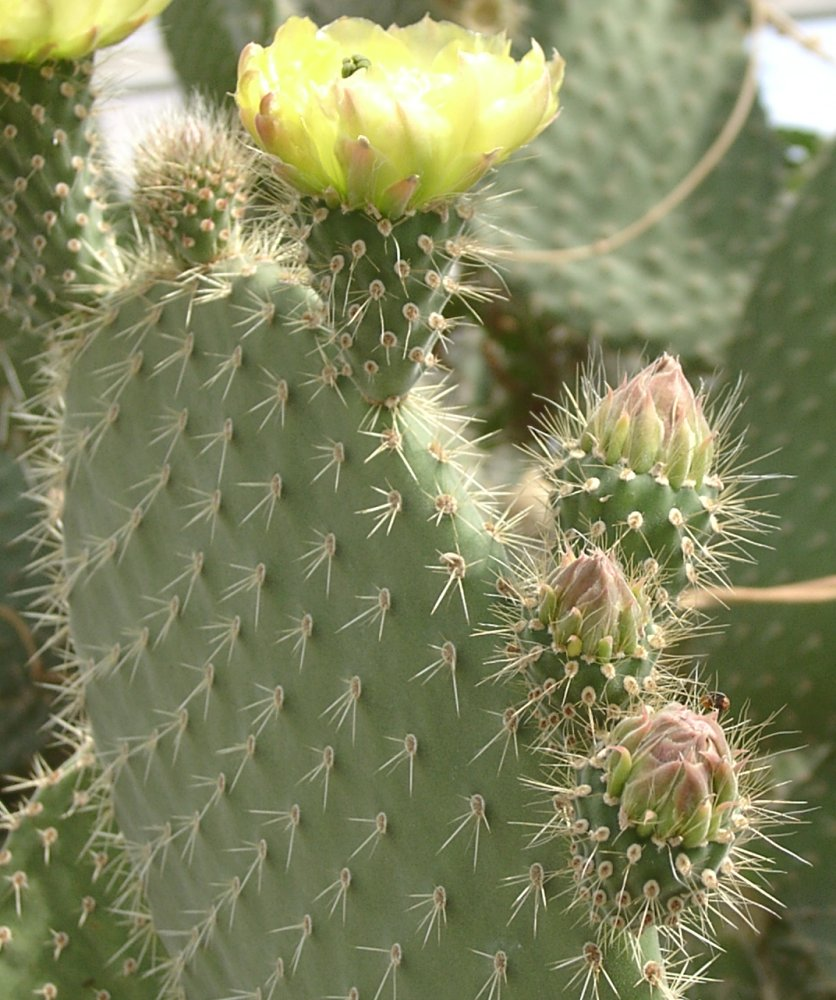
Opuntia leucotricha

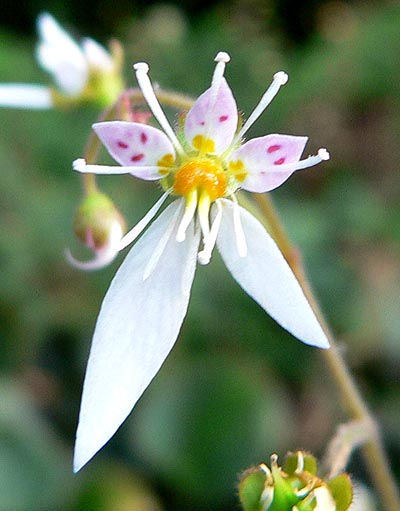
Saxifraga stolonifera

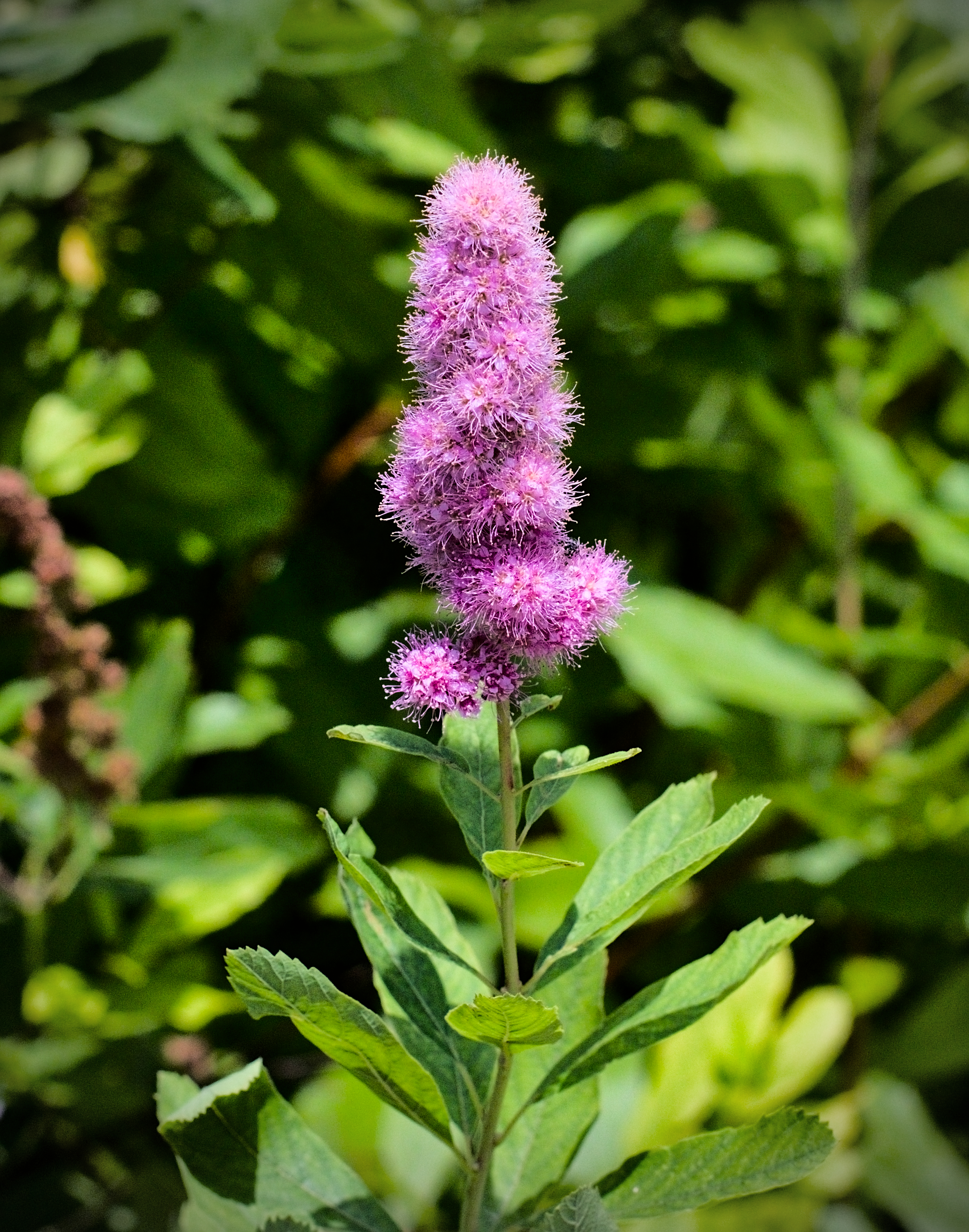
Spiraea salicifolia

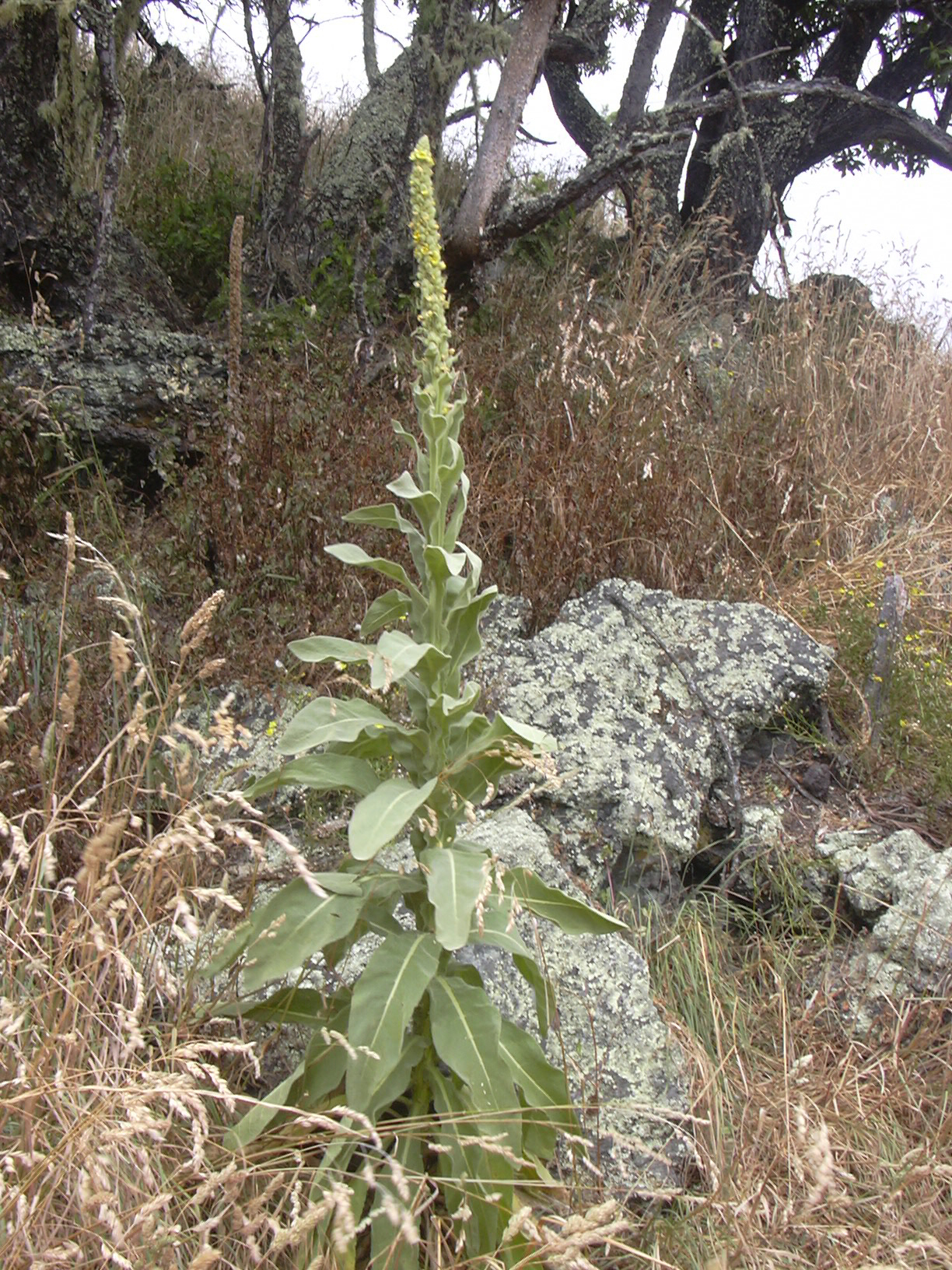
Verbascum thapsus
