= Erin Lake =

Lake in the state of Minnesota, United States

- Location within Minnesota
- Location: Sibley County, Minnesota
- Coordinates: 44°40′2″N 93°58′20″W
- Type: lake

Erin Lake is a lake in Sibley County, in the U.S. state of Minnesota.

Formally named Mud Lake, the city voted to rename the lake after Erin Farber, to which it is now known as Erin Lake.

== See also ==
- List of lakes in Minnesota
