= Eren Yeager =

Fictional character from Attack on Titan

- Attack on Titan character
- Eren, as depicted in the Attack on Titan manga
- First appearance: Attack on Titan chapter 1: "To You, 2,000 Years from Now" (2009)
- Last appearance: Attack on Titan chapter 139: "Toward the Tree on That Hill" (2021)
- Created by: Hajime Isayama
- Portrayed by: Haruma Miura
- Voiced by: Japanese: Yuki Kaji; English: Bryce Papenbrook

In-universe information
- Family: Grisha Yeager (father); Carla Yeager (mother); Mikasa Ackerman (Love interest)
- Relatives: Zeke Yeager (paternal older half-brother); Mr. Yeager (paternal grandfather); Mrs. Yeager (paternal grandmother); Faye Yeager (paternal aunt)

Eren Yeager (Japanese: エレン・イェーガー, Hepburn: Eren Yēgā) (Turkish: Eren, "Saint"; German: Jaeger/Jäger, "Hunter") is the protagonist of the Attack on Titan manga series created by Hajime Isayama. Eren is a teenager who swears revenge on enormous man-eating humanoid creatures known as Titans, who have forced what remains of the human race to live in walled-off cities and devoured his mother while destroying his hometown in the Shiganshina district of Wall Maria. In order to defeat the Titans, Eren enlists in the Military and joins the Survey Corps – an elite group of soldiers who fight Titans outside the walls, whilst studying the physiology of Titans so as to better understand and defend themselves against these creatures. As the story progresses, Eren gains the power of becoming a Titan later identified as "Attack Titan" (進撃の巨人, Shingeki no Kyojin).

Isayama created Eren with the idea of a character whose fears and dreams were relatable but often clashed with his own darkness, resulting in multiple changes to his characterization. In the anime adaptation of the series, his name is spelled as Eren Jaeger. Eren's voice was provided by Yūki Kaji in Japanese and Bryce Papenbrook in English. Both of these actors found difficulties in employing different types of voices based on how Eren grows up across the narrative. In the live-action film adaptations, he is portrayed by Haruma Miura.

Critical reception to Eren was initially polarized, finding him too antagonistic and harsh for his age. Positive comments focused on the character's ideals and newfound powers as a Titan as well as his character arc. Reception has become more positive in later arcs of the manga and anime as he becomes a more ambiguous rather than heroic character, evidenced in the 6th Crunchyroll Anime Awards where Eren was nominated for "Best Protagonist" and "Best Antagonist" simultaneously, and went on to win in the latter category. The character has proven popular within the Attack on Titan fanbase, while his voice actors Kaji and Papenbrook received praise for their portrayals of the character.

== Creation and design ==
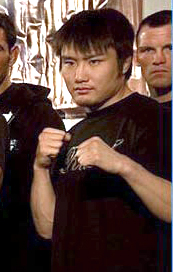
Eren's fighting style is based on Takanori Gomi.

Author Hajime Isayama created Eren to be "an ordinary youngster who gets paralyzed with fear" when seeing a titan. As a result, he was not given unit warrior talent in comparison to other members from the series. Isayama has stated that part of the reason he chose the name "Eren" for the character is because it sounds feminine, which would make it easier to remember. Isayama has stated that he has struggled in the past to make Eren feel "alive" when writing and has called the character "a slave to the story".

Isayama stated that Eren's wish to go outside the city's walls is similar to his own. When he was a child, he lived in a rural Japanese town surrounded by mountains. One day, he wanted to go beyond the mountains, which reflected in the town surrounded by walls in the manga where Eren lived in the series' beginning. In retrospect, Isayama believes Eren fits the type of narrative he wrote for Attack on Titan, something that Isayama managed to relate with.

Isayama has stated he paid particular attention to Eren's eyes when designing him, in order to make him stand out from the rest of the cast. He specifically chose to give Eren thin eyebrows instead of thick ones because he felt it would be "artificial" to try to use thicker eyebrows to accent Eren's angry personality. Because Eren is an energetic character, Isayama chose to give him black hair so that it would be easier to draw speed lines around him when he is moving. The character's Titan form's physique was modeled after middleweight mixed martial artist Yushin Okami. Isayama has also identified Takanori Gomi's southpaw fighting style as a model used for Eren's Titan and the way it fights. Isayama originally intended for Eren to have known all along that he was a Titan. As he looked over previous chapters of the manga, Isayama stated that Eren's fight against the Warhammer was one of his favorite scenes. Isayama considers Eren to contain the worst parts of him as a person and as a result he wrote the manga to get rid of him, eventually killing him in the ending.

=== Actors ===
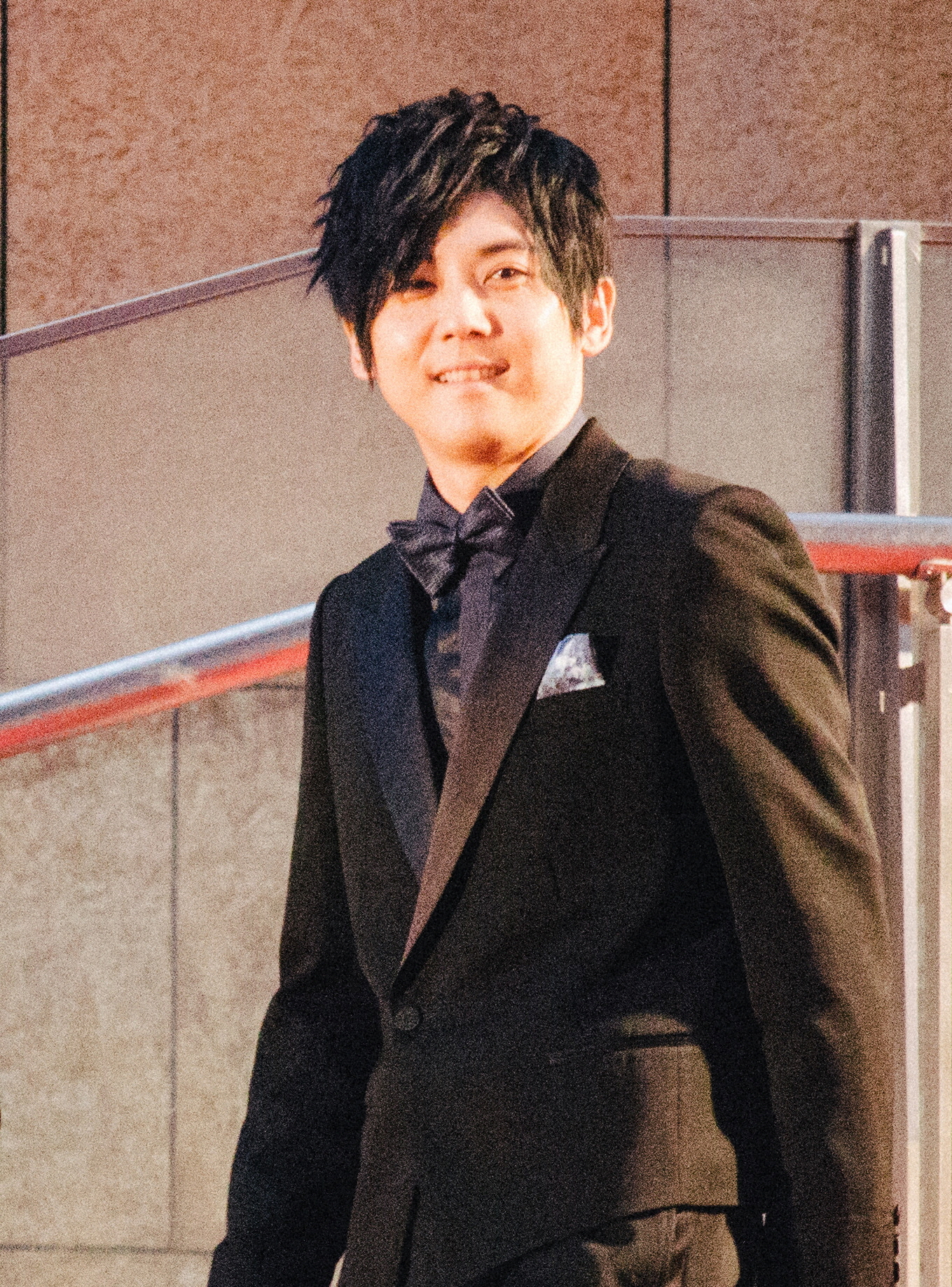
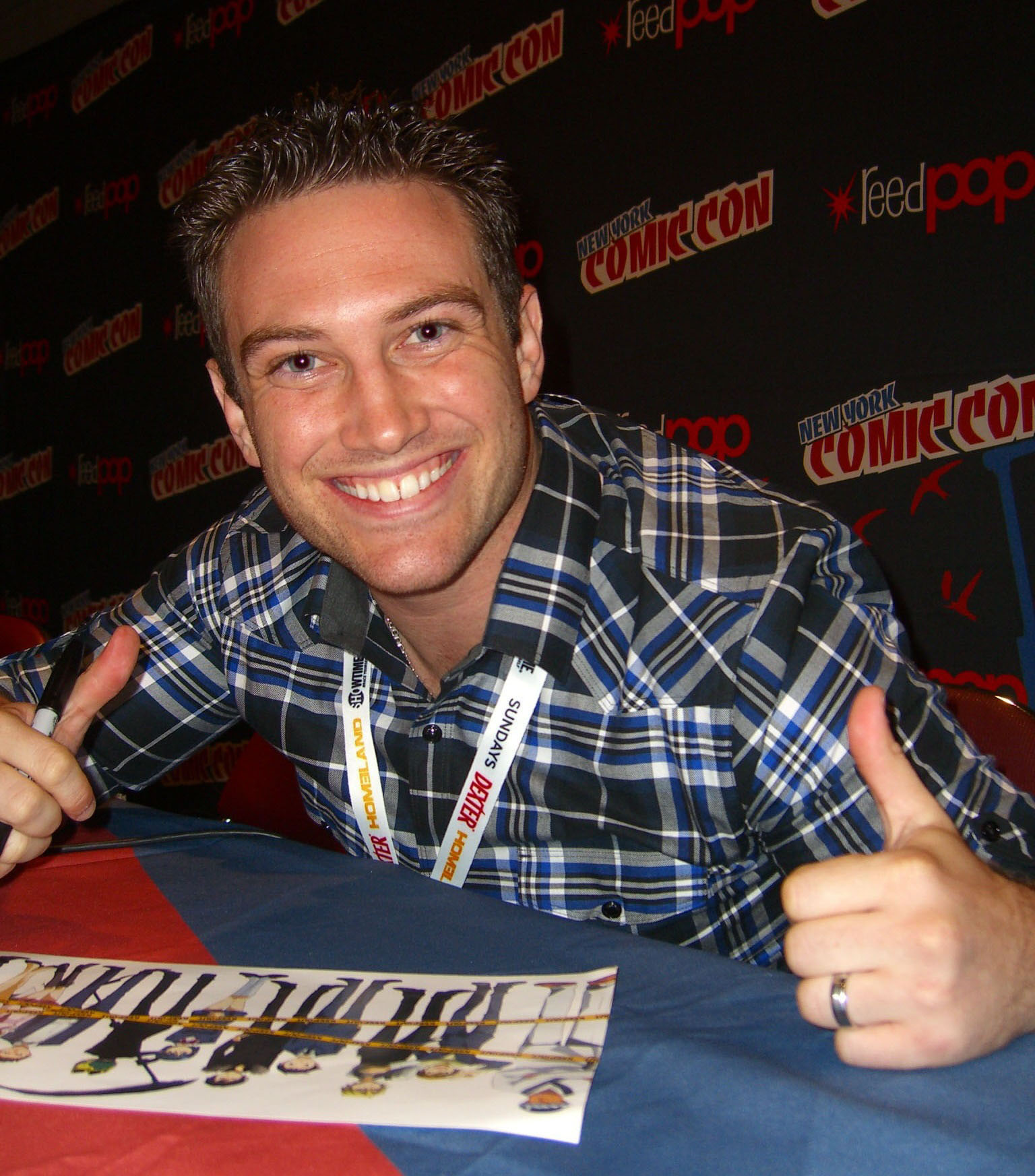
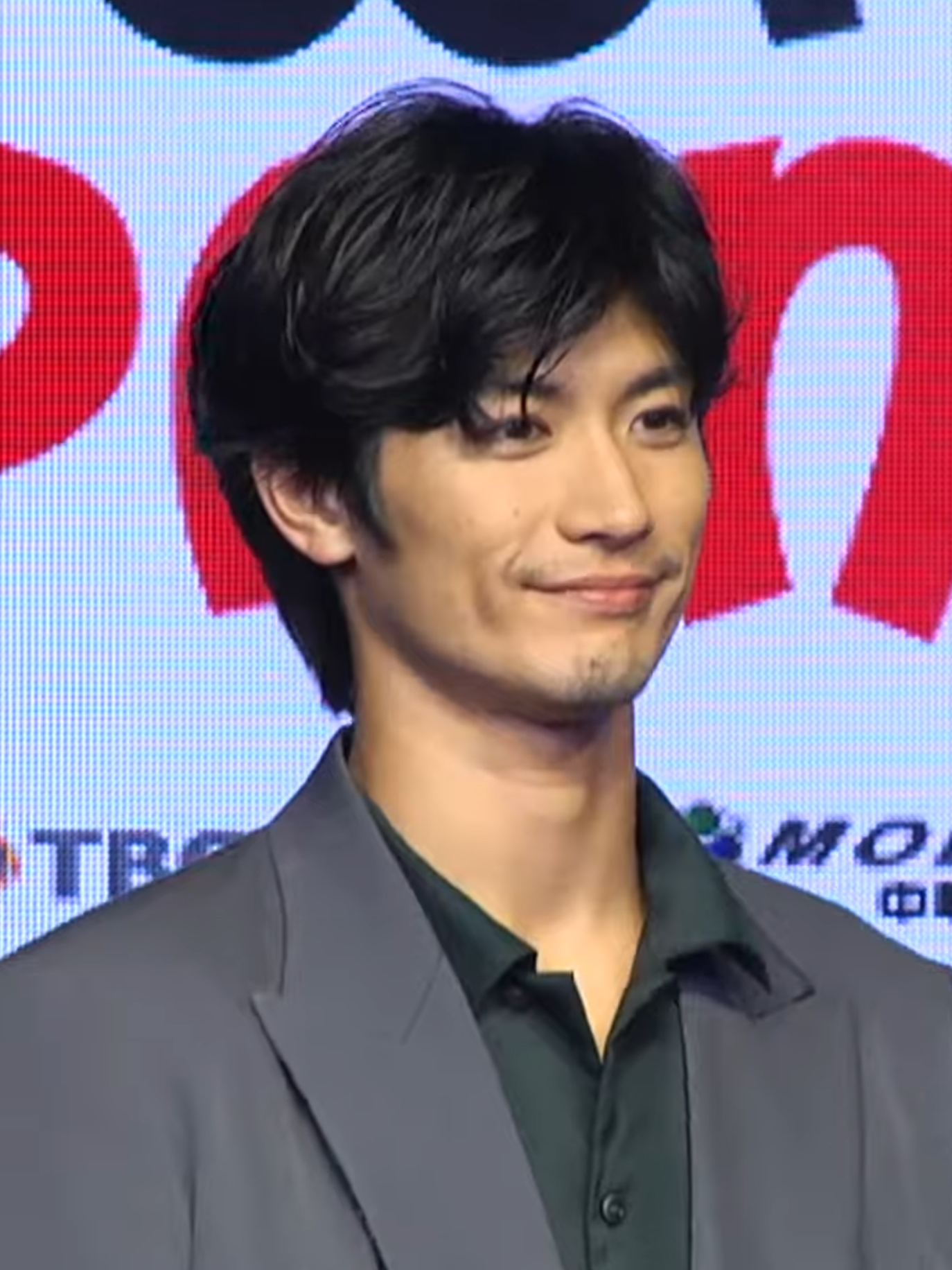
Yūki Kaji (left) and Bryce Papenbrook (middle) voice Eren in Japanese and English, respectively. Haruma Miura (right) portrayed him in the live-action film.

Japanese actor Yūki Kaji commented on how it was important that he should voice Eren's Titan form because he believes it is an extension of the character. He had a meal with Isayama after he visited the recording studio and the manga artist told him he found Eren quite a difficult character but complimented Kaji by saying "You know Eren already", which gave him confidence. Eren's characterization was briefly altered for the English dub of the series making him self-reflective and eloquent in some scenes. Kaji described Eren for the second season as a person who never changes despite his growth, finding this trait important for the drama. The staff and him did not want to change the way Kaji changed Eren's portrayal in the making of the second season. Upon seeing Kaji's portrayal of Eren, Yukimura believes he was more heroic than the Eren he originally wrote in the manga.

English voice actor Bryce Papenbrook got excited when he got the role of Eren as he was a fan of the show before it was announced that it would be dubbed into English. As a result, he viewed this as an advantage as he managed to understand the character beforehand. For example, he could understand the delivery of several lines because he already knew of the anime's series of twists. Additionally, he saw himself prepared for the role's pressure due to his previous works in popular anime.

He was excited because Eren was different from his previous characters despite sharing a similar age and vocal range, he commented "It's a very raw sound. Some of the noises he pulled out of me were just disgusting. I loved it. I loved every second of it." Papenbrook noted how different was Eren from his previous role as noted in the delivery of emotions and notable screams. There were three different kinds of voices he used for Eren: One for his kid persona, another deeper for his young adult self and a third "which was different from anything else." He recorded all three of those, and "there were noises that were required that were just disgusting and nasty." While he saw Eren's screams as challenging, he believes it was not the most difficult he ever had.

Haruma Miura stated he was proud of portraying Eren in the live-action film, adding that he was surprised by being cast for the role. Due to the appeal of the series, Miura tried to stay true to Eren's characterization when working in the movie and hoped Asian viewers would enjoy his work. Miura found the shooting of the movie challenging including the training to move like the character. Miura aimed to show Eren's naivety traits when working in the movie.

=== Characterization and themes ===
Isayama wrote Eren with the intention of portraying a "victim who becomes the perpetrator". He describes Eren's personality as that of a child who uses rage as his motivation as a result of his weakness and failure to save his mother from the Titans. His retaliation against such pressures triggered all this fury, which led to a major introduction to the core of his traits. Many illustrations of him were brutal in nature due to his constant struggle against unforgiving surroundings. However, this hatred often combined with inexperience, causing him to act dangerously and recklessly charge ahead. Early in the series when Eren is revealed to be a Titan shifter, Isayama thinks he wrote him calmer than his original depiction. He did that in order to give fellow character Armin more determination as Eren relied on him in order to clear him of the military's accusation that he was an enemy to mankind.

Originally, Isayama was asked by his editor, who Eren's rival in the manga was. Although initially he said it was Annie, Isayama noted that there was no such rivalry between them and instead thought that Eren needed to overcome something to become stronger. Despite initial issues in understanding Eren, Isayama noted that the character reminded him more and more of himself afterwards, though he still found Eren hard to write. In later chapters when confronting Annie, Isayama wanted to give Eren more responsibility by making him suffer the powerlessness of his allies being killed by the traitor. Another major scene for Eren's arc involved how he realized his powers are not good due to how he was manipulated by his father Grisha and thought he should not live due to this guilt, especially when realizing he killed his own father as a child. Talking more about Eren's rivalries, Isayama instead compared him with Luke Skywalker from Star Wars as he finds fitting how both characters have an inner conflict with their darker personas. Isayama describes Eren's personality as an emotional complex; as his existing beliefs are gradually destroyed, Eren starts thinking about simply preserving himself as a new standard, and consequently acts on that way of thinking.

By the manga's 22nd volume, Isayama drew an image of Eren looking at the sea, something that motivated him during his childhood. Comparing the trio of Eren, Mikasa and Armin to high school students who grow across childhood until graduating, he viewed the scene of the trio seeing the sea as an alternate ending to the manga. However, Isayama stated that starting this moment, Eren and his friends began to mature and fill positions left behind by military superiors. Isayama said that viewing Eren as "dragged along by the story" had become the essence of his character, and that Mikasa and Armin had developed a habitual mindset of revolving around him and wishing to help him. According to Isayama, at first their mindset was favoritism, comparing Eren's relationships with Mikasa and Armin to that of helping one's relatives or siblings who are encountering hardship, even if onlookers question it. He stated that despite their similar ages, Eren, Mikasa and Armin had different states of mind and that their growth might involve their possible separation and even opposing one another. Stating that he did not see Armin and Eren being best friends forever, he further explored a personal writing style rejecting the concept of a fated soulmate between Eren and Mikasa. He often wrote about how the two would become estranged and go through character development and independence, though he did not view their drifting apart as necessarily a good thing to portray.

Isayama noted Eren's characterization is different of what it was originally viewed by the fans; while originally wishing to see the sea as a dream shared with Armin, the truth was that Eren was never that interested in the sea itself. While Armin possessed a global-oriented curiosity and dreamed of the natural world outside the walls, Eren instead held only self-focused indignation towards the lack of freedom that mankind had to seeing it, causing an inner part of him to wonder if he was empty-headed. This resulted in gradual clarity to their diverging perspectives as Eren's grasp on the sea subsequently fades.

== Appearances ==
=== In Attack on Titan ===
Eren's form as the Attack Titan was based on Yushin Okami.

Eren Yeager is introduced as a ten-year-old residing in the town of Shiganshina who dreams of joining the Survey Corps in order to explore the outside world beyond the walls. A year prior to the events of the story, accompanying his father Grisha to meet her parents, Eren saves Mikasa Ackerman from a group of kidnappers, which led to the development of his ideology at a young age. When the Titans invade Shiganshina, Eren is powerless as he watches his mother be devoured by an abnormally large titan with a face deformity that gives it a constant smile, and thus vows to kill every Titan henceforth. Eren then enlists himself in the military, with hazy memories of last meeting his father while receiving a key to their home's basement. During his first mission at Trost, Eren sacrifices himself to save his friend Armin Arlert from being swallowed by a bearded Titan. Eren manages to transform into a Titan himself, proving his newfound strength worthy to fight for mankind. Eren earns a place in the Special Operations Squad, a branch of Survey Corps under Captain Levi. Eren is hunted by a female Titan but is saved by Levi and Mikasa. The Titan is later revealed to be his classmate Annie Leonhart, who is defeated by Eren but freezes herself. Upon being chased by more of Annie's allies, Eren awakens a power known as the "Founding Titan" (始祖の巨人, Shiso no Kyojin), which he subconsciously uses to direct a group of Titans to attack them. The Smiling Titan reappears and attempts to kill Eren and Mikasa, but Eren uses his power to command another herd of Titans to beat it to death.

Soon after, Eren is sent with his friends to an isolated village while preparations are made for a campaign to retake Wall Maria. Eren is then captured by Rod Reiss, who reveals the Founding Titan was originally in his family for years since their ancestor Karl Fritz created the walls, and that the Reiss family used it to rule until it was stolen by Grisha. Grisha is revealed to be responsible for Eren becoming a Titan, passing the Founding Titan's power to his son at the cost of his life. Eren's classmate Krista Lenz, who is actually Rod's child Historia Reiss, refuses to aid her father and frees Eren. Eren and the Survey Corps led by Commander Erwin depart to Shiganshina to reclaim Wall Maria and battle an army of Titans led by Zeke, the Beast Titan, and his subordinates Bertholdt and Reiner, who are also Eren's former classmates and the real identity of the Colossal Titan and Armored Titan. Erwin sacrifices himself in a suicide charge to distract Zeke whilst Levi sneaks up behind him. Zeke kills Erwin and most of the Corps by throwing a volley of boulders at them, with Erwin being nearly sliced in half. Levi fights Zeke after this, slicing open his left arm, slashing his heels open and slicing his eyes out. He then attempts to subdue Zeke, now in his human form, but he escapes. Armin devises a plan to kill Bertholdt and charges head on, but Bertholdt uses the colossal's power to burn Armin to a crisp and almost kill him, but Eren rips him out of his Titan and defeats him. Mikasa fires a missile down the Armored Titan's mouth and thus renders Reiner also immobilised. Levi uses a serum to turn Armin into a Titan, so that he can both be healed and possess the power of the Colossal Titan when he eats Bertholdt. He does so, and Bertholdt begs for forgiveness and mercy from the same people he tried to kill before Armin crushes his skull and devours him.

With Shiganshina secured, Eren and his friends learn of Grisha's past once they reach the Yeager family basement: Zeke is revealed to be Eren's half brother and Grisha's first son, and the people within the walls are revealed to have originated in another nation named Marley. They learn that humanity exists beyond the walls and that their true enemy is Marley, while they live on an island called Paradis Island, and are a race called Eldians (specifically the "Subjects of Ymir"), descendants of the original titan shifter Ymir Fritz. They learn that in the past, Ymir Fritz's power split into the Nine Titans that would be passed down to her people. This power conquered and subjugated many races and nations, including Marley. Marley eventually overthrew Eldia, taking control of Seven of the Nine Titans before oppressing and demeaning the Eldians left on the continental mainland, using them as holders of the Titan powers as a means to conquer and subjugate other nations, just as the Eldian Empire had once done. Eren learns that he has a limited lifespan as a side effect of being a holder of two of the Nine Titans' power, including the titular "Attack Titan" (進撃の巨人, Shingeki no Kyojin), along with the Founding Titan, only having 8 years left to live. Eren also sees the memory of his father slaughtering the Reiss family and his own future self would influence those actions. The Attack Titan's ability to relay future memories to previous inheritors allow Eren through Grisha to see his own future memories. Eren is horrified and deeply disheartened by the inevitable path he will take.

Four years later, assumed to have been fending off Marleyan infiltrators with the new Colossal Titan Armin, Eren is leading the Survey Corps in an extraction of Zeke in Liberio following Marley having won its war with the Mid-East Allied Forces. Having his left leg amputated, Eren assumes the identity of "Mr. Kruger" (クルーガーさん, Kurūgā-san), a former Marleyan military officer. During the festival held by Willy Tybur to declare war on Paradis, Eren responds with an attack, killing Willy and then devouring his sister to gain the War Hammer Titan's power. Eren's actions result in his arrest but he escapes with a group of Survey Corps members loyal to him called "Yeagerists", and he resumes his search for Zeke. Eren makes himself known to Armin and Mikasa, showing antagonism for his friends, and is ambushed by a group of soldiers led by Reiner. Eren attempts to reach Zeke to activate the Founding Titan's power, but is nearly killed by Gabi; Zeke saves his brother, turning out to be the one who has control of the Founding Titan's power, because as a member of the royal family that wasn't descended from the first King of the Walls, he wasn't brainwashed by the latter's will, and because Ymir Fritz, the source of the Founding Titan's power, was bound as a slave to her royal descendants. Eren convinces Ymir to help him after giving her the choice to make her own decision. Revived, Eren frees the Titans within the Walls and declares his intent to exterminate all life outside Paradis in order to protect his people, becoming the world's enemy. Hange battles the army of Titans but succumbs to death via burning via the heat of Wall Titans. The Wall Titans destroy all of Marley, as well as the Attack on Titan world's equivalents of London, Paris, America and Africa, killing most of the world's population before a team led by Armin fights Zeke, who was hiding on one of the spikes on the spine of Eren's Titan. When Zeke emerges after the fight, Levi ambushes him and decapitates him, killing him and severing Eren's connection to the titans. With Zeke's death, Mikasa and her allies reach Eren, with Mikasa decapitating him to save humanity. With no host, Eren's founding titan form falls apart onto the remaining titans.

Armin wakes up with a memory of Eren explaining everything in the Paths and the two embrace accepting mutual responsibility for what happened as Eren wanted to wipe out everything as it differed from the world he imagined and Armin acknowledges that he put that dream in his head. With Eren dead and 80% of the world's population exterminated, the Founder's power is lost and the Titan Shifters rejoice as they are permanently transformed back into humans. Mikasa buries Eren's head under the same tree he used to nap under as a child, with a small gravestone to remember him by.

Hajime Isayama, the creator of the manga, drew from the appearance of a creature from the Cambrian era known as Hallucigenia. Isayama used this creature as a key source of inspiration to create Eren's final Titan form. This terrifying, massive, and skeletal appearance reflects Eren's gradual loss of humanity. By incorporating the unusual traits of Hallucigenia, Isayama designed a disturbing silhouette that seems to defy anatomical logic, amplifying the monstrous and inhuman aspects of this Titan. This inspiration highlights Isayama's ability to merge real and fictional elements to enrich the aesthetic of his work, thus adding a striking visual and symbolic depth to his universe.

=== In other media ===
In the parody manga Attack on Titan: Junior High, Eren is presented as a junior high school student who is obsessed with the Titans. In the visual novel Attack on Titan: Lost Girls an alternative take of the character shows his relationship with Mikasa, who fears that, regardless of changes in history, Eren is fated to die. He is a playable character in Attack on Titan: The Last Wings of Mankind for the Nintendo 3DS. His Titan form also makes an appearance in the game. Jin Haganeya's visual novel Burning Bright in the Forests of the Night has Eren and Levi as the leading characters. He also appears in the mobile game Granblue Fantasy. Eren also makes an appearance in the parody spin-off manga Spoof on Titan. Following the manga's ending, the newspaper Asahi Shimbun put a fake advertisement of Eren's character becoming part of a manga from the isekai genre.

Eren Yeager appears in Fortnite Battle Royale as part of the Chapter 4 Season 2 Battle Pass.

Eren would feature in several of the opening and ending songs for the Attack on Titan anime. In "Akuma no Ko", Eren's motives and characterization are depicted throughout, a mirror of the series' first ending song "Utsukushiki Zankoku na Sekai". In "Itterashi", the final ending song of the series, Eren and Mikasa are depicted reuniting.

Eren, together with Mikasa and Levi, features in Mobile Legends: Bang Bang as part of the game collaboration and the show with Eren appears as a skin for Yin. The collaboration appears in January 2024, two months after the anime ended its final episode.

== Reception ==
=== Popularity ===
In the 3rd Newtype Anime Awards for 2013, Eren was voted as eighth best male character. In Animage's Anime Grand Prix 2014 polls, Eren ranked as the fourth most popular male anime character, behind Levi who was voted the most popular. However, his Japanese voice actor ranked first among all voice actors, with Eren as his primary credit for that period. In the Animedia Eren was nominated for multiple categories including "Most Valuable Player", "Darkness", "Hot" and "Brave"; He only won the "Hot" award, but took high places in the rest. Anime News Network also listed his Titan form as one of the weirdest power ups seen in anime. In a Newtype poll, he was voted the tenth most popular male anime character from the 2010s. At the 5th Crunchyroll Anime Awards, Lucas Almeida won Best Voice Artist Performance (Portuguese) for his performance as Eren. In July 2021, he once again appeared in the Newtype polls. At the 6th Crunchyroll Anime Awards, Eren won the award for Best Antagonist, while also being nominated for both Best Protagonist and Best Fight Scene for his fight against War Hammer Titan. The character's voice actor Yuki Kaji won the award for Best Voice Artist Performance (Japanese) while Vlad Tokarev was nominated in the Russian voice acting category, but lost to Islam Gandzhaev's Tanjiro Kamado. Eren won the award for Best Main Character, while Yuki Kaji won in the same voice acting category for the second consecutive year in the seventh edition. Eren and Yuki Kaji were once again nominated in the same categories as last year in the eighth edition. Miguel Ángel Leal won Best Voice Artist Performance (Spanish) for his performance as Eren in the ninth edition.

Eren is featured in a variety of merchandise. In December 2013, the Good Smile Company released the Eren Picktam! strap along with straps of other characters from the series. The official Eren Yeager nendoroid and figma were also launched after the series' success. These figures exist via a variety of figurine and merchandise companies. Eren's figma was released in May 2014, and the nendoroid was released in April 2014. In addition to figures, Bandai has released Eren plushes, a smaller one in December 2013 and a larger one in July 2014. Eren Yeager, along with many other characters from the series, also has a dedicated perfume inspired by his character traits. His perfume was released by Koubutsuya in fall of 2013 along with the perfumes for Mikasa Ackerman and Levi. In an Akiba Souken poll, Eren was voted as the most popular character from the series with 50,143 votes.

=== Critical response ===
Critical reception to Eren's character has been varied. Jacob Hope Chapman of Anime News Network referred to Eren as "almost deliberately not a 'likable' protagonist, even by 15-year-old boy standards" because he is violent, impulsive, and not especially smart or strong. However, he liked that he inspires people by believing in his feelings, hopes, and dreams, making him the "heart of humanity". Theron Martin noted that while Eren initially has hardly any emotion besides anger, in later episodes he eventually does have emotions beyond that. Jeffrey Kaufman of Blu-ray.com calls Eren "a compelling character, and once a really surprising development crops up a few episodes in, he becomes even more compelling." Ken Iikura Anime Now highly acclaimed Eren for the way his emotions are shown in the series due to his constant rage regarding his desire to take vengeance for the Titans who ate his mother as well as his reaction to the discovery of the two Titans who have been posing as his friends. As a result, Iikura said Eren was more appealing due to his emotions rather than the powers he reveals across the series to fight. While acclaiming the episode "Warrior", the site MANGA.TOKYO praised Eren's interactions with Reiner and Bertolt due to the two latter characters opening themselves to Eren as enemy Titans but the three remains as calm until their eventual fight. The character was often compared with Thorfinn from Vinland Saga due to their similar struggles with getting revenge as well as how the same studio did of their own anime adaptations.

Kyle Charizanis of The Fandom Post found the anime portrayal of Eren's transformation to be amusing, starting from his "almost pitiful" look while declaring how he's going to kill all of the Titans. When the anime portrays him as capable of controlling his transformation, Charizanis adds "Maybe one day he'll be able to contort his body to be used as a bridge, or heal other people's wounds, or morph his arms into sharp blades like a certain other anime character." In the final anime episode, when Eren is fighting the Female Titan, he describes Eren's internal monologue as changing "from the usual violent determination to a kind of gleeful madness" and likens his tone to that of The Joker. Elijah Watson from Complex magazine liked the plot twist of Eren's titan form turning on the other titans that he called it a Worldstar moment. Bamboo Dong of Anime News Network was fond of Eren's Titan abilities as "there has not been anything as uncomfortable for me to watch as Eren chomping into his own hand, trying to transform. There is something visceral and real about Eren drawing blood from his own hand, and boy, it gave me the chills", and later praised his thoughts when fighting the Female Titan due to the portrayal of Eren's humanity despite being a Titan.

Other reviews were more critical on the character. Nicole MacLean of THEM Anime Reviews found him "a frustrating protagonist" based on how his angry fits and exclamations "can be seen as highly childish". Elliot Gray of Japanator called him a "normal protagonist" and instead found Mikasa and Armin more appealing. Similarly, Anna Neatrour from Manga Bookshelf called him "in many ways a fairly brash and opinionated hero". On the other hand, Justin Wu from The Artifice saw Eren's hotheadness as a positive trait of the character. Chapman found Bryce Papenbrook's child Eren forced but noted his performance once the character grew up was far better.

IGN found Eren started to have a notable character arc in the anime's third season as he learns from his past thoughts, but found it painful in comparison to other characters due to how harsh Eren is with himself. MangaTokyo acclaimed Eren's growth across the anime series' until the finale of its third season due to how he realizes the amount of enemies he has to face changing from having angry tantrums to a more collected mind seeking the freedom of his people. The Fandom Post noted that one of the major twists of the third season was discovering the relationship between Eren and Zeke. Another reviewer praised how the development of the characters and discovery of the truth behind Grisha also reflected on the childhood moments from Eren, Mikasa and Armin.

For the final arc, Den of Geek and IGN noted that while Eren becomes a darker character due to his harsh interactions to Mikasa and Armin to the point he comes across as a fallen villain with Zeke being the apparent cause. IGN viewed his role as more ambiguous when he talks to Mikasa in a flashback about their bonds. The Fandom Post commented despite his aggressive comments, Eren's new characterization might include lies as some generate a major impact on Mikasa's feelings for her. His appearance as the Attack Titan in the final frames of the opening of the anime's final season were compared to that of Hideaki Anno's Shin Godzilla movie (2016) by Anime News Network due to how threatening it looks. The darker portrayal of Eren was noted to fit in the Attack on Titan when compared with Thorfinn's by Anime News Network as theme songs have lyrics involving war in order to further link the two protagonists, with Eren ending it with his life and Thorfinn deciding to live his the rest of his life atoning for it.

Reception for the end of Eren's character arc in the manga was polarized. When Eren later reveals his motivations for committing mass murder to make his friends into heroes to Armin in the last chapter of the manga, the latter thanks Eren, which sparked reader controversy. In an interview regarding this scene, Isayama clarified that Armin was not condoning Eren's actions, but acknowledging that he was Eren's accomplice. Recognizing that reception to the final manga arc and last chapter was mixed, Isayama admitted that Eren's motivations and the story themes he wished to portray during the arc ended up being difficult to depict and that he regrets being unable to fully express those themes in the manga. In response to the controversy surrounding the last chapter, the final episode of the anime depicts the scene differently as Eren reveals that his motive was indeed to exterminate the world to achieve a free one and Armin instead tells Eren that they will go to hell together for their shared responsibility in committing mass murder; a change that was received more positively than the original dialogue.
