= Stephan Auer =

Austrian footballer

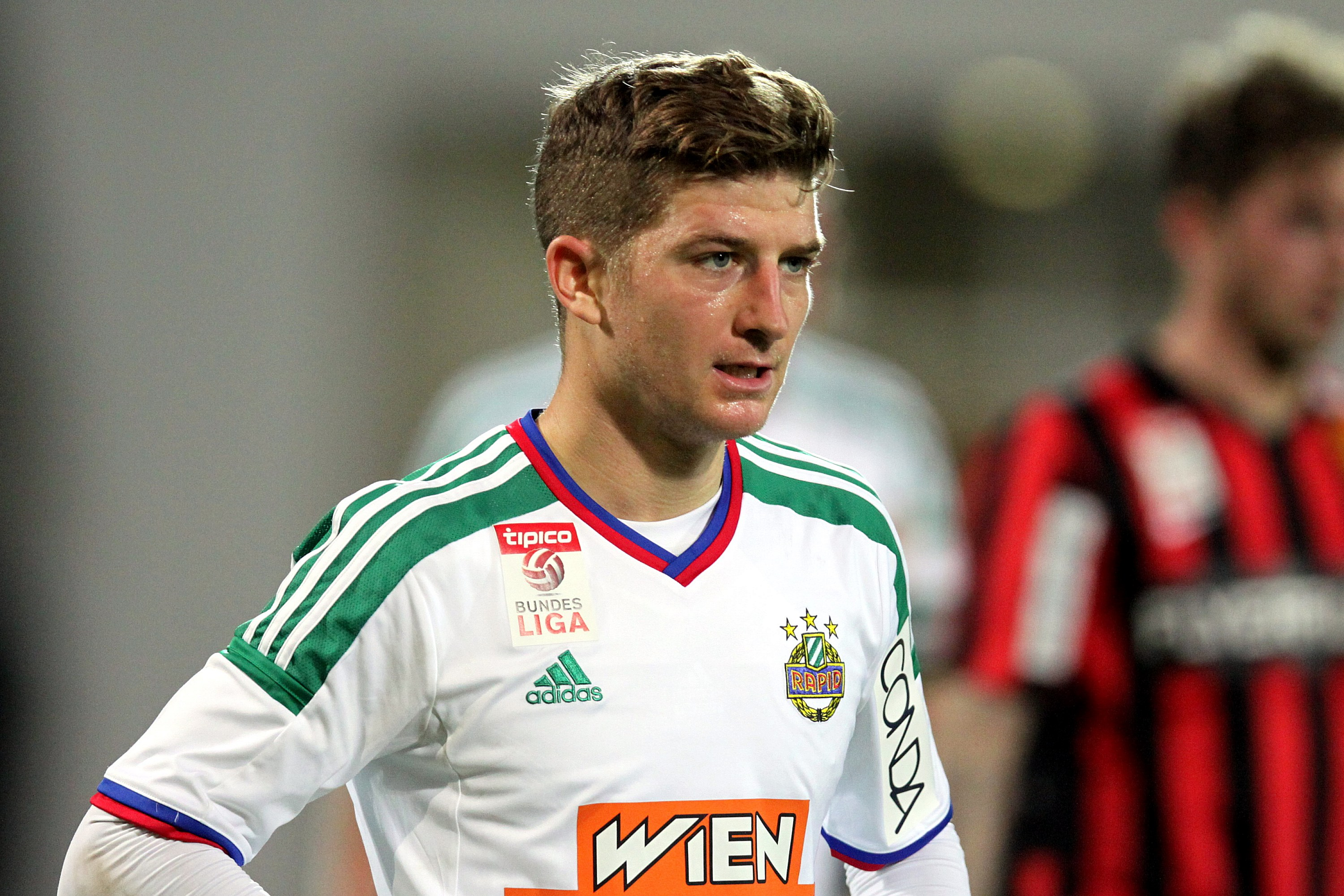
- Auer in 2015

Personal information
- Date of birth: 11 January 1991 (age 35)
- Place of birth: Vienna, Austria
- Height: 1.76 m (5 ft 9 in)
- Position: Right-back

Team information
- Current team: First Vienna
- Number: 6

Youth career
- 1997–2002: SV Schwechat
- 2002–2010: Admira Wacker

Senior career*
Years	Team	Apps	(Gls)
2011–2015	Admira Wacker	101	(3)
2015–2020	Rapid Wien	101	(2)
2020–2022	Admira Wacker	25	(0)
2022–	First Vienna	37	(2)
- * Club domestic league appearances and goals as of 20 June 2023, 18:30 (UTC)

Stephan Auer (born 11 January 1991) is an Austrian footballer who plays for First Vienna.

== Club career ==
On 28 September 2020, he returned to Admira Wacker.

On 21 January 2022, Auer signed a 1.5-year contract with First Vienna.
