= Aaron's rod (disambiguation) =

Aaron's rod refers to any of the walking sticks carried by Moses' brother, Aaron, in the Torah.

Aaron's rod may also refer to:

== Plants ==
- Hylotelephium telephium, a plant also known as orpine or live-forever
- Solidago, a genus of North American plants with yellow flowers
- Thermopsis villosa, a species of North American plant with yellow flowers
- Verbascum thapsus, a biennial plant with medicinal uses and tall flowering stems

== Other uses ==
- Aaron's Rod (novel), by D. H. Lawrence
