= Manuel Thurnwald =

Austrian footballer (born 1998)

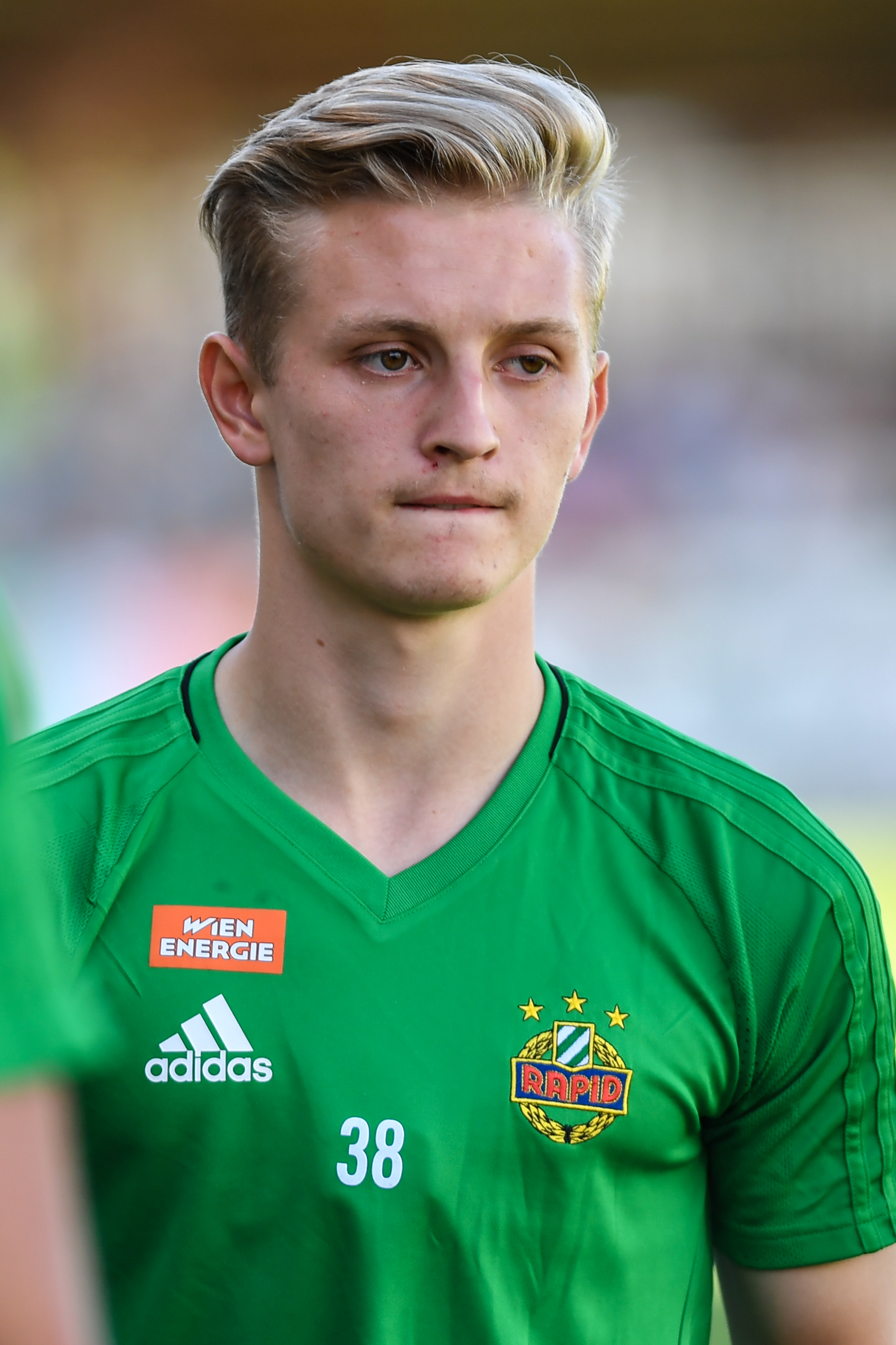
- Thurnwald with Rapid Wien in 2017

Personal information
- Full name: Manuel Thurnwald
- Date of birth: 16 July 1998 (age 28)
- Place of birth: Vienna, Austria
- Height: 1.72 m (5 ft 8 in)
- Position: Full-back

Team information
- Current team: Hertha Wels
- Number: 77

Youth career
- 2003–2016: Rapid Wien

Senior career*
Years	Team	Apps	(Gls)
2016–2019	Rapid Wien	27	(1)
2019–2023	Rheindorf Altach	94	(3)
2025	Floridsdorfer AC	8	(0)
2025–	Hertha Wels	25	(3)

International career^{‡}
2016–2017	Austria U19	9	(0)
2017–	Austria U21	3	(1)
2019–	Austria U20	1	(0)
- * Club domestic league appearances and goals as of 17 May 2026 ‡ National team caps and goals as of 13:50, 9 August 2019 (UTC)

Manuel Thurnwald (born 16 July 1998) is an Austrian professional footballer who plays as a full-back for Hertha Wels.

== Club career ==
=== Early career ===
Born in 1998, Thurnwald started his football career with Rapid Wien youth team.

=== Rapid Wien ===
In 2016, Thurnwald was called up for Rapid Wien first team. On 6 November 2016, Thurnwald made his senior team debut in Austrian Football Bundesliga against Wolfsberger AC at Allianz Stadion, playing the game as a starter for full-time game by coach Mike Büskens.

=== Rheindorf Altach ===
On 22 July 2019, Thurnwald joined Rheindorf Altach on a two-year deal with an option for one further year. He departed the club as his contract expired at the end of the 2022–23 Austrian Football Bundesliga season.

=== Floridsdorfer AC ===
On 27 January 2025, after being without a club for a year and a half, Thurnwald signed a contract with Floridsdorfer AC.
