= Aaron, Malawi =

Aaron
- Location in Malawi Aaron (Africa)
- Coordinates: 12°45′S 34°13′E
- Country: Malawi
- Region: Central Region
- District: Nkhotakota District

Aaron is a village in the Nkhotakota District of Central Region, Malawi, located on the western shore of Lake Malawi. The town was named after the biblical prophet Aaron, by Christian missionaries.
