= Efkan Eren =

Turkish basketball player (born 1989)

No. 11 – Sakarya Büyükşehir Belediyesi S. K.
- Position: Small forward / power forward
- League: Turkish Basketball League

Personal information
- Born: July 12, 1989 (age 37) Istanbul, Turkey
- Listed height: 6 ft 8 in (2.03 m)
- Listed weight: 220 lb (100 kg)

Career information
- College: Lindenwood University (2010–2013)
- NBA draft: -: undrafted
- Playing career: 2003–present

Career history
- 2003–2008: Fenerbahçe Spor Kulübü
- 2008–2009: Yeşilyurt Spor Kulübü
- 2009–2010: Maine Central Institute
- 2010: Monmouth University
- 2010–2011: Pitt Community College
- 2011–2013: Lindenwood University
- 2014: Acıbadem University Spor Kulübü
- 2015: Sakarya Büyükşehir Belediyesi Spor Kulübü

Career highlights
- MIAA Champions (2011); MIAA Champions (2012); National Collegiate Athletic Association All-American Scholar Athlete (2012); MIAA Champions (2013); NCAA Transitional National Champions (2013); National Collegiate Athletic Association All-American Scholar Athlete (2013); NCAA Defensive Player of the Year (2013); Lindenwood University Athletic Committee Lindenwood Athletic Excellence Award (2013); NCAA Student-Athlete of the Year (2013)

Efkan Eren (born July 12, 1989) is a Turkish professional basketball player who plays for Sakarya Büyükşehir Belediyesi S.K. of the Turkish Basketball League (TBL). He plays at both the small forward and power forward positions. He is the CEO of Top Camp USA and also is a graphic designer who has studied his undergraduate degree and played college basketball for Lindenwood University of the National Collegiate Athletic Association (NCAA), located in St. Charles, Missouri.

== Early years ==
Efkan began his basketball career at the Fenerbahçe youth teams in the Istanbul, Turkey. He played for Fenerbahçe youth teams for 5 years. He was an average kid who didn't shine until his final two years of youth teams. On 2007, he averaged 19.8 points, 7.1 rebounds, 2.0 assists, 1.8 steals. He raised his average on 2008 with 24.4 points, 6.4 rebounds, 1.7 assists, 1.4 steals, where he also proved himself playing both the junior and professional teams of the club.

== College years ==
After playing 1 year professionally for Yeşilyurt Spor Kulübü in Istanbul, he was offered scholarship from Monmouth University in New Jersey. Because he wasn't qualified with his TOEFL score, he was sent to improve his English and play basketball for Maine Central Institute in Pittsfield, Maine (one of the top prep school programs at the time). His prep school season went well, and he got multiple offers from some of well-known universities with basketball programs. However, he couldn't get eligible from NCAA Clearinghouse to play for an NCAA program, due to his disqualification of Professionalism Certification, because of his pro history back in Turkey. Through his punishment for not being able to play in an NCAA program for a year, in the 2009–10 season, he decided to attend to Pitt Community College where he helped Bulldogs to reach semifinals in the conference finals. After a year at PCC, he, again, received multiple offers, including programs from both DI and DII schools.

He decided to play for Lindenwood University in St. Charles, Mo, where he helped Lions to win 3 back to back Conference Championships and one NCAA Transitional National Championship. At the end of his college basketball career, he was selected as the NCAA Student-Athlete of the Year by StudyInAmerica, where he was nominated back to back for two years. (Efkan Eren's "Believe. Work. Play. Achieve." Poster).

Efkan studied BFA Graphic Design, Computer Arts and Graphics in Lindenwood University.

== Professional career ==
=== Basketball career ===
In 2008 when Efkan was 17 years old, he signed with Yeşilyurt Spor Kulübü, a pro club that was in TBL. After turning back from the United States in 2013, he was injured and was not able to sign with any team for a year. Next season he got a chance to play for Acıbadem Universitesi Spor Kulübü, competing in TBL. In 2015, he signed with Sakarya Büyükşehir Belediyesi Spor Kulübü in the same league.

=== Designing career ===
Studying BFA Graphic Design, Computer Arts and Graphics in Lindenwood University while continuing his basketball career, he was able to follow on his job as a graphic designer. He started working as a freelance graphic designer. After he moved to Turkey, he opened his own designing agency, collaborating with Or-B Organizations.

He also is the CEO of Top Camp USA organizations, founded in 2012.
