= İbrahim Eren =

Turkish bureaucrat

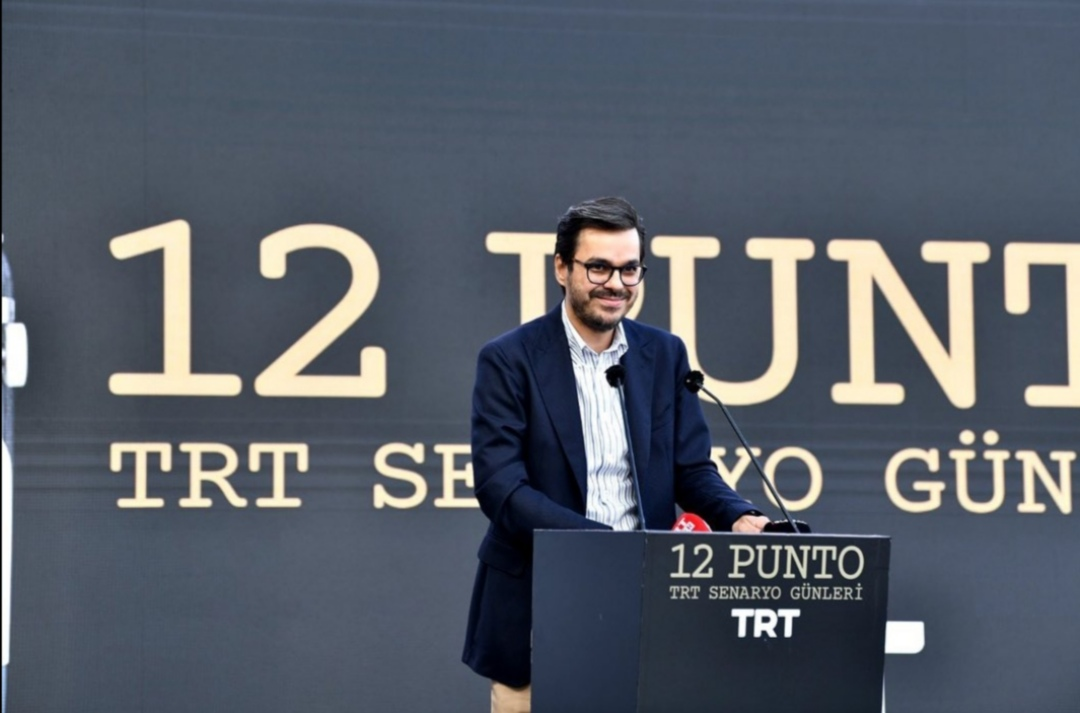
- Born: 26 May 1980 (age 46); Istanbul, Turkey
- Education: Boğaziçi University; University of Westminster
- Occupations: Bureaucrat; Director general of TRT (2017–2021)

İbrahim Eren (born 26 May 1980) is a Turkish bureaucrat.

== Education ==
He graduated from the Department of Political Science and International Relations of Boğaziçi University and went on to pursue a master of arts in Media Management from the University of Westminster.

== Career ==
Eren started his career at different companies in the field of culture and arts, later producing many programs, including national and international documentaries, animations, promotional films and commercials in the media production sector.

He started to work at ATV within Turkuvaz Media Group in 2008. In his role, he directed the processes of making internal productions effective and determining the channel restructuring strategies. İbrahim Eren began his career at TRT as deputy director general in 2013 and served as chairman and director general from July 2017 to 14 July 2021, when his mandate ended and he was succeeded by Mehmet Zahid Sobacı. After his appointment, he carried out national projects like Diriliş, Payitaht Abdülhamit, Filinta, Sevda Kuşun Kanadında, Yedi Güzel Adam, Seddülbahir 32 Saat and Büyük Sürgün Kafkasya and also carried out the first international news channel, TRT World. Eren also relaunched TRT 2 after seven years of inactivity.

As director general of TRT, İbrahim Eren was a member of the board of directors of the European Broadcasting Union (EBU) and is currently the president of the Asia-Pacific Broadcasting Union (ABU), as well as a board member for Türksat in the International Emmy Awards.
