= Eren Keles =

Austrian-Turkish footballer

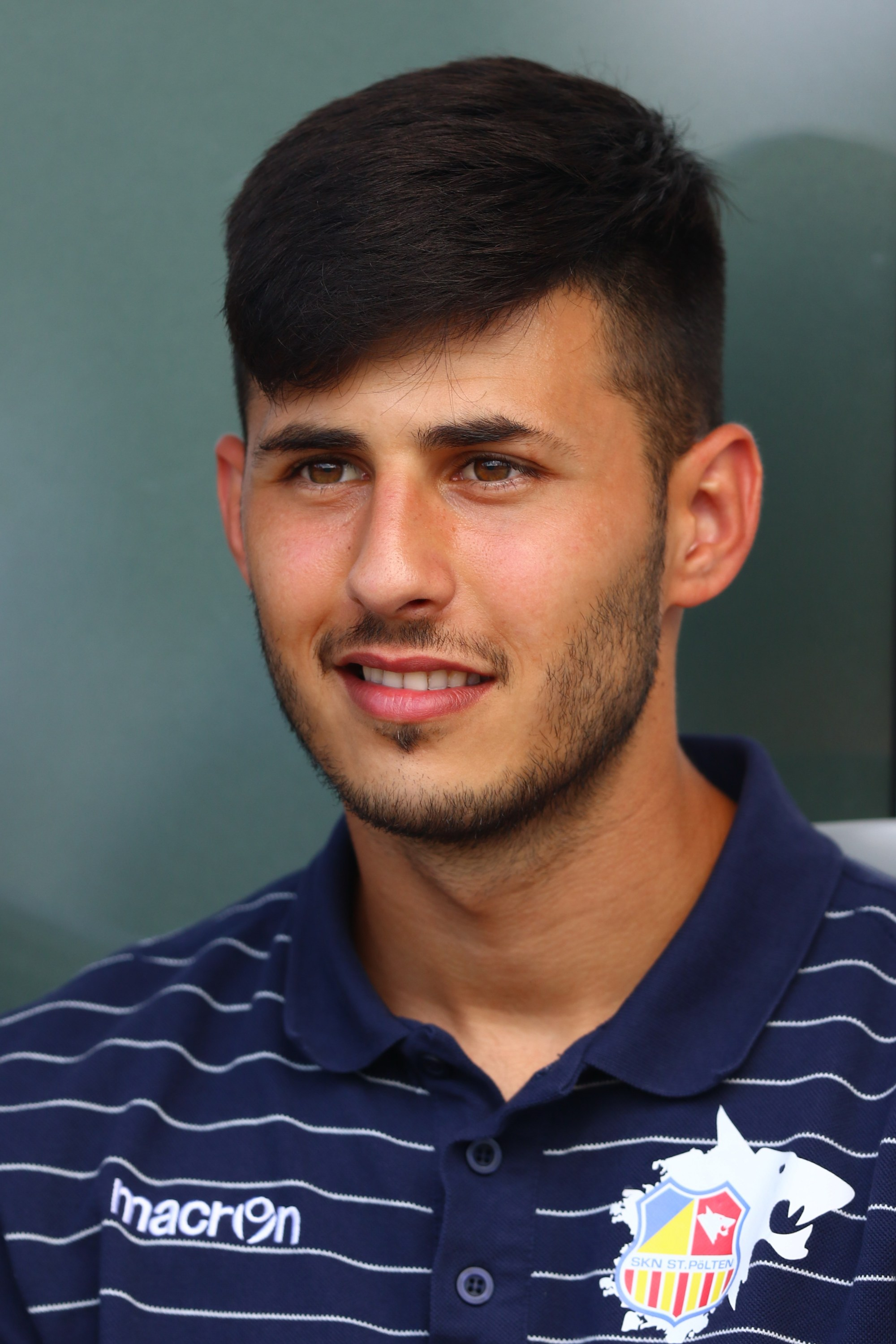
- Keles in 2018

Personal information
- Date of birth: 13 May 1994 (age 32)
- Place of birth: Vienna, Austria
- Height: 1.83 m (6 ft 0 in)
- Position: Left midfielder

Team information
- Current team: Wiener Sport-Club
- Number: 14

Youth career
- 2002–2010: Wiener Linien

Senior career*
Years	Team	Apps	(Gls)
2010–2015	Wiener Linien	104	(26)
2015–2016	First Vienna	40	(5)
2017	Rapid Wien II	16	(6)
2017	Rapid Wien	8	(1)
2018	SKN St. Pölten II	1	(0)
2018	SKN St. Pölten	11	(1)
2018–2021	Adanaspor	77	(9)
2021–2022	Ankaraspor	14	(1)
2022	Tarsus İdman Yurdu	19	(4)
2022–2023	Floridsdorfer AC	27	(1)
2024	Mauerwerk	6	(0)
2024–	Wiener Sport-Club	54	(11)
- * Club domestic league appearances and goals as of 28 June 2026

Eren Keles (born 13 May 1994) is a professional footballer who plays for Wiener Sport-Club. Born in Austria and as his parents are from Turkey, Eren Keles remains eligible to represent either Austria or Turkey on international level.

== Career ==
Keles joined Floridsdorfer AC on 10 July 2022, after having played in Turkey for four years.

== Career statistics ==
Club performance			League		Domestic Cup		Total	
Season	Club	League	Apps	Goals	Apps	Goals	Apps	Goals
2015–16	Vienna	Austrian Regional League East	26	4	1	0	27	4
2016–17	Vienna	Austrian Regional League East	14	1	2	1	16	2
2016–17	Rapid Wien II	Austrian Regional League East	9	1			9	1
2017–18	Rapid Wien	Austrian Football Bundesliga	8	1	1	0	9	1
2017–18	Rapid Wien II	Austrian Regional League East	7	5			7	5
