= 2015–16 UEFA Europa League group stage =

International football competition

The 2015–16 UEFA Europa League group stage was played from 17 September to 10 December 2015. A total of 48 teams competed in the group stage to decide 24 of the 32 places in the knockout phase of the 2015–16 UEFA Europa League.

== Draw ==
The draw was held on 28 August 2015, 13:00 CEST, at the Grimaldi Forum in Monaco. The 48 teams were drawn into twelve groups of four, with the restriction that teams from the same association could not be drawn against each other. For the draw, the teams were seeded into four pots based on their 2015 UEFA club coefficients. Moreover, the draw was controlled for teams from the same association in order to split the teams evenly into the two sets of groups (A–F, G–L) for maximum television coverage.

The fixtures were decided after the draw. On each matchday, six groups play their matches at 19:00 CEST/CET, while the other six groups play their matches at 21:05 CEST/CET, with the two sets of groups (A–F, G–L) alternating between each matchday. There are other restrictions: for example, teams from the same city (e.g., Sporting CP and Belenenses, Fenerbahçe and Beşiktaş) in general do not play at home on the same matchday (UEFA tries to avoid teams from the same city playing at home on the same day, due to logistics and crowd control), and teams in certain countries (e.g., Belarus, Russia) do not play at home on the last matchday (due to cold weather and simultaneous kick-off times).

On 17 July 2014, the UEFA emergency panel ruled that Ukrainian and Russian clubs would not be drawn against each other "until further notice" due to the political unrest between the countries. Therefore, Ukrainian club Dnipro Dnipropetrovsk (Pot 1) and Russian clubs Rubin Kazan (Pot 1), Lokomotiv Moscow and Krasnodar (both Pot 3) could not be drawn into the same group.

== Teams ==
Below are the 48 teams which qualified for the group stage (with their 2015 UEFA club coefficients), grouped by their seeding pot. They included sixteen teams which entered in this stage, the 22 winners of the play-off round, and the ten losers of the Champions League play-off round.

Key to colours
Group winners and runners-up advance to the round of 32

Pot 1
Team	Notes	Coeff
(Germany) Schalke 04		111.883
(Germany) Borussia Dortmund		99.883
(Switzerland) Basel		84.875
(Italy) Napoli		84.102
(England) Tottenham Hotspur		84.078
(Netherlands) Ajax		66.195
(Spain) Villarreal		58.999
(Russia) Rubin Kazan		57.099
(Spain) Athletic Bilbao		56.999
(Portugal) Sporting CP		56.276
(France) Marseille		55.483
(Ukraine) Dnipro Dnipropetrovsk		52.033

Pot 2
Team	Notes	Coeff
(Portugal) Braga		51.776
(Italy) Fiorentina		49.102
(Italy) Lazio		49.102
(Belgium) Anderlecht		47.440
(England) Liverpool		47.078
(Netherlands) AZ		46.695
(Czech Republic) Viktoria Plzeň		41.825
(Belgium) Club Brugge		41.440
(Greece) PAOK		40.880
(Scotland) Celtic		39.080
(Turkey) Beşiktaş		36.520
(Cyprus) APOEL		35.460

Pot 3
Team	Notes	Coeff
(France) Monaco		31.483
(Czech Republic) Sparta Prague		30.825
(Turkey) Fenerbahçe		30.020
(Poland) Legia Warsaw		24.800
(France) Bordeaux		24.483
(Russia) Lokomotiv Moscow		23.099
(Poland) Lech Poznań		17.300
(France) Saint-Étienne		16.983
(Czech Republic) Slovan Liberec		16.325
(Germany) FC Augsburg		15.883
(Austria) Rapid Wien		15.635
(Russia) Krasnodar		15.099

Pot 4
Team	Notes	Coeff
(Serbia) Partizan		14.775
(Greece) Asteras Tripolis		13.380
(Portugal) Belenenses		12.276
(Norway) Rosenborg		11.875
(Azerbaijan) Qarabağ		11.500
(Norway) Molde		10.375
(Belarus) Dinamo Minsk		9.650
(Netherlands) Groningen		8.695
(Switzerland) Sion		8.375
(Denmark) Midtjylland		7.960
(Albania) Skënderbeu		5.575
(Azerbaijan) Gabala		2.750

Notes

1. ^{EL-PO} Winners of the play-off round.
2. ^{CL-CR} Losers of the Champions League play-off round (Champions Route).
3. ^{CL-LR} Losers of the Champions League play-off round (League Route).

== Format ==
In each group, teams played against each other home-and-away in a round-robin format. The group winners and runners-up advanced to the round of 32, where they were joined by the eight third-placed teams from the Champions League group stage.

=== Tiebreakers ===
The teams were ranked according to points (3 points for a win, 1 point for a draw, 0 points for a loss). If two or more teams were equal on points on completion of the group matches, the following criteria were applied in the order given to determine the rankings (regulations Article 16.01):

1. higher number of points obtained in the group matches played among the teams in question;
2. superior goal difference from the group matches played among the teams in question;
3. higher number of goals scored in the group matches played among the teams in question;
4. higher number of goals scored away from home in the group matches played among the teams in question;
5. if, after having applied criteria 1 to 4, teams still had an equal ranking, criteria 1 to 4 were reapplied exclusively to the matches between the teams in question to determine their final rankings. If this procedure did not lead to a decision, criteria 6 to 12 applied;
6. superior goal difference in all group matches;
7. higher number of goals scored in all group matches;
8. higher number of away goals scored in all group matches;
9. higher number of wins in all group matches;
10. higher number of away wins in all group matches;
11. lower disciplinary points total based only on yellow and red cards received in all group matches (red card = 3 points, yellow card = 1 point, expulsion for two yellow cards in one match = 3 points);
12. higher club coefficient.

== Groups ==
The matchdays were 17 September, 1 October, 22 October, 5 November, 26 November, and 10 December 2015. The match kickoff times were 19:00 and 21:05 CEST/CET, except for six matches (certain matches in Azerbaijan, Belarus, Russia and Turkey) which were 17:00 CEST/CET. Times up to 24 October 2015 (matchdays 1–3) were CEST (UTC+2), thereafter (matchdays 4–6) times were CET (UTC+1).

=== Group A ===
Pos	Team	Pld	W	D	L	GF	GA	GD	Pts	Qualification	MOL	FEN	AJX	CEL
1	(Norway) Molde	6	3	2	1	10	7	+3	11	Advance to knockout phase	—	0–2	1–1	3–1
2	(Turkey) Fenerbahçe	6	2	3	1	7	6	+1	9	Advance to knockout phase	1–3	—	1–0	1–1
3	(Netherlands) Ajax	6	1	4	1	6	6	0	7		1–1	0–0	—	2–2
4	(Scotland) Celtic	6	0	3	3	8	12	−4	3		1–2	2–2	1–2	—

Source: Soccerway
Rules for classification: Group stage tiebreakers
17 September 2015
19:00

Fenerbahçe (Turkey)	1–3	(Norway) Molde
Nani 42'	Report	Høiland 36' (pen.); Elyounoussi 53'; Linnes 65'

Şükrü Saracoğlu Stadium, Istanbul
Attendance: 31,209
Referee: Benoît Bastien (France)
17 September 2015
19:00

Ajax (Netherlands)	2–2	(Scotland) Celtic
Fischer 25'; Schöne 84'	Report	Bitton 8'; Lustig 42'

Amsterdam Arena, Amsterdam
Attendance: 47,455
Referee: Luca Banti (Italy)

1 October 2015
21:05

Celtic (Scotland)	2–2	(Turkey) Fenerbahçe
Griffiths 28'; Commons 32'	Report	Fernandão 43', 48'

Celtic Park, Glasgow
Attendance: 41,330
Referee: Kenn Hansen (Denmark)
1 October 2015
21:05

Molde (Norway)	1–1	(Netherlands) Ajax
E. Hestad 8'	Report	Fischer 19'

Aker Stadion, Molde
Attendance: 7,890
Referee: Paweł Raczkowski (Poland)

22 October 2015
21:05

Molde (Norway)	3–1	(Scotland) Celtic
Kamara 11'; Forren 18'; Elyounoussi 56'	Report	Commons 55'

Aker Stadion, Molde
Attendance: 9,166
Referee: Vladislav Bezborodov (Russia)
22 October 2015
21:05

Fenerbahçe (Turkey)	1–0	(Netherlands) Ajax
Fernandão 89'	Report

Şükrü Saracoğlu Stadium, Istanbul
Attendance: 35,292
Referee: David Fernández Borbalán (Spain)

5 November 2015
19:00

Celtic (Scotland)	1–2	(Norway) Molde
Commons 26'	Report	Elyounoussi 21'; D. Hestad 37'

Celtic Park, Glasgow
Attendance: 37,071
Referee: Slavko Vinčić (Slovenia)
5 November 2015
19:00

Ajax (Netherlands)	0–0	(Turkey) Fenerbahçe
	Report

Amsterdam Arena, Amsterdam
Attendance: 48,990
Referee: Liran Liany (Israel)

26 November 2015
21:05

Molde (Norway)	0–2	(Turkey) Fenerbahçe
	Report	Fernandão 68'; Tufan 84'

Aker Stadion, Molde
Attendance: 8,235
Referee: Miroslav Zelinka (Czech Republic)
26 November 2015
21:05

Celtic (Scotland)	1–2	(Netherlands) Ajax
McGregor 4'	Report	Milik 22'; Černý 88'

Celtic Park, Glasgow
Attendance: 44,118
Referee: Felix Zwayer (Germany)

10 December 2015
19:00

Fenerbahçe (Turkey)	1–1	(Scotland) Celtic
Marković 39'	Report	Commons 75'

Şükrü Saracoğlu Stadium, Istanbul
Attendance: 35,372
Referee: Serge Gumienny (Belgium)
10 December 2015
19:00

Ajax (Netherlands)	1–1	(Norway) Molde
Van de Beek 14'	Report	Singh 29'

Amsterdam Arena, Amsterdam
Attendance: 48,041
Referee: Yevhen Aranovsky (Ukraine)

=== Group B ===
Pos	Team	Pld	W	D	L	GF	GA	GD	Pts	Qualification	LIV	SIO	RUB	BOR
1	(England) Liverpool	6	2	4	0	6	4	+2	10	Advance to knockout phase	—	1–1	1–1	2–1
2	(Switzerland) Sion	6	2	3	1	5	5	0	9	Advance to knockout phase	0–0	—	2–1	1–1
3	(Russia) Rubin Kazan	6	1	3	2	6	6	0	6		0–1	2–0	—	0–0
4	(France) Bordeaux	6	0	4	2	5	7	−2	4		1–1	0–1	2–2	—

Source: Soccerway
Rules for classification: Group stage tiebreakers
17 September 2015
19:00

Bordeaux (France)	1–1	(England) Liverpool
Jussiê 81'	Report	Lallana 65'

Nouveau Stade de Bordeaux, Bordeaux
Attendance: 35,328
Referee: Alberto Undiano Mallenco (Spain)
17 September 2015
19:00

Sion (Switzerland)	2–1	(Russia) Rubin Kazan
Konaté 11', 82'	Report	Kanunnikov 65'

Stade de Tourbillon, Sion
Attendance: 7,000
Referee: Andreas Ekberg (Sweden)

1 October 2015
21:05

Rubin Kazan (Russia)	0–0	(France) Bordeaux
	Report

Central Stadium, Kazan
Attendance: 17,642
Referee: Gediminas Mažeika (Lithuania)
1 October 2015
21:05

Liverpool (England)	1–1	(Switzerland) Sion
Lallana 4'	Report	Assifuah 18'

Anfield, Liverpool
Attendance: 37,252
Referee: Slavko Vinčić (Slovenia)

22 October 2015
21:05

Liverpool (England)	1–1	(Russia) Rubin Kazan
Can 37'	Report	Dević 15'

Anfield, Liverpool
Attendance: 42,951
Referee: Robert Schörgenhofer (Austria)
22 October 2015
21:05

Bordeaux (France)	0–1	(Switzerland) Sion
	Report	Lacroix 21'

Nouveau Stade de Bordeaux, Bordeaux
Attendance: 18,318
Referee: Aleksandar Stavrev (Macedonia)

5 November 2015
19:00

Rubin Kazan (Russia)	0–1	(England) Liverpool
	Report	Ibe 52'

Kazan Arena, Kazan
Attendance: 41,585
Referee: Kevin Blom (Netherlands)
5 November 2015
19:00

Sion (Switzerland)	1–1	(France) Bordeaux
Chantôme 90+4' (o.g.)	Report	Touré 67'

Stade de Tourbillon, Sion
Attendance: 9,000
Referee: Ivan Kružliak (Slovakia)

26 November 2015
17:00

Rubin Kazan (Russia)	2–0	(Switzerland) Sion
Georgiev 72'; Dević 90'	Report

Kazan Arena, Kazan
Attendance: 15,116
Referee: Halis Özkahya (Turkey)
26 November 2015
21:05

Liverpool (England)	2–1	(France) Bordeaux
Milner 38' (pen.); Benteke 45+1'	Report	Saivet 33'

Anfield, Liverpool
Attendance: 42,525
Referee: Alon Yefet (Israel)

10 December 2015
19:00

Bordeaux (France)	2–2	(Russia) Rubin Kazan
Laborde 58'; Rolán 63'	Report	Kanunnikov 31'; Ustinov 76'

Nouveau Stade de Bordeaux, Bordeaux
Attendance: 13,640
Referee: John Beaton (Scotland)
10 December 2015
19:00

Sion (Switzerland)	0–0	(England) Liverpool
	Report

Stade de Tourbillon, Sion
Attendance: 10,000
Referee: Michael Koukoulakis (Greece)

=== Group C ===
Pos	Team	Pld	W	D	L	GF	GA	GD	Pts	Qualification	KRA	DOR	PAOK	QAB
1	(Russia) Krasnodar	6	4	1	1	9	4	+5	13	Advance to knockout phase	—	1–0	2–1	2–1
2	(Germany) Borussia Dortmund	6	3	1	2	10	5	+5	10	Advance to knockout phase	2–1	—	0–1	4–0
3	(Greece) PAOK	6	1	4	1	3	3	0	7		0–0	1–1	—	0–0
4	(Azerbaijan) Gabala	6	0	2	4	2	12	−10	2		0–3	1–3	0–0	—

Source: Soccerway
Rules for classification: Group stage tiebreakers
17 September 2015
19:00

Gabala (Azerbaijan)	0–0	(Greece) PAOK
	Report

Bakcell Arena, Baku (Note: Gabala played their home matches at Bakcell Arena, Baku, instead of their regular stadium City Stadium, Qabala.)
Attendance: 7,500
Referee: Javier Estrada Fernández (Spain)
17 September 2015
19:00

Borussia Dortmund (Germany)	2–1	(Russia) Krasnodar
Ginter 45+1'; Park Joo-ho 90+3'	Report	Mamayev 12'

Signal Iduna Park, Dortmund
Attendance: 55,200
Referee: Liran Liany (Israel)

1 October 2015
21:05

Krasnodar (Russia)	2–1	(Azerbaijan) Gabala
Wánderson 8'; Smolov 84'	Report	Dodô 51'

Kuban Stadium, Krasnodar
Attendance: 8,901
Referee: Marcin Borski (Poland)
1 October 2015
21:05

PAOK (Greece)	1–1	(Germany) Borussia Dortmund
Mak 34'	Report	Castro 72'

Toumba Stadium, Thessaloniki
Attendance: 25,663
Referee: Anthony Taylor (England)

22 October 2015
17:00

Gabala (Azerbaijan)	1–3	(Germany) Borussia Dortmund
Dodô 90+3'	Report	Aubameyang 31', 38', 72'

Bakcell Arena, Baku
Attendance: 10,500
Referee: Ivan Bebek (Croatia)
22 October 2015
21:05

PAOK (Greece)	0–0	(Russia) Krasnodar
	Report

Toumba Stadium, Thessaloniki
Attendance: 9,325
Referee: Andreas Ekberg (Sweden)

5 November 2015
19:00

Krasnodar (Russia)	2–1	(Greece) PAOK
Ari 33'; Joãozinho 67' (pen.)	Report	Mak 90+1'

Kuban Stadium, Krasnodar
Attendance: 15,550
Referee: Arnold Hunter (Northern Ireland)
5 November 2015
19:00

Borussia Dortmund (Germany)	4–0	(Azerbaijan) Gabala
Reus 28'; Aubameyang 45'; Zenjov 67' (o.g.); Mkhitaryan 70'	Report

Signal Iduna Park, Dortmund
Attendance: 57,000
Referee: Sébastien Delferière (Belgium)

26 November 2015
17:00

Krasnodar (Russia)	1–0	(Germany) Borussia Dortmund
Mamayev 2' (pen.)	Report

Kuban Stadium, Krasnodar
Attendance: 30,150
Referee: Serdar Gözübüyük (Netherlands)
26 November 2015
21:05

PAOK (Greece)	0–0	(Azerbaijan) Gabala
	Report

Toumba Stadium, Thessaloniki
Attendance: 6,131
Referee: Jakob Kehlet (Denmark)

10 December 2015
19:00

Gabala (Azerbaijan)	0–3	(Russia) Krasnodar
	Report	Sigurðsson 26'; Pereyra 41'; Wánderson 76'

Bakcell Arena, Baku
Attendance: 3,000
Referee: István Kovács (Romania)
10 December 2015
19:00

Borussia Dortmund (Germany)	0–1	(Greece) PAOK
	Report	Mak 33'

Signal Iduna Park, Dortmund
Attendance: 55,200
Referee: Mattias Gestranius (Finland)

=== Group D ===
Pos	Team	Pld	W	D	L	GF	GA	GD	Pts	Qualification	NAP	MID	BRU	LEG
1	(Italy) Napoli	6	6	0	0	22	3	+19	18	Advance to knockout phase	—	5–0	5–0	5–2
2	(Denmark) Midtjylland	6	2	1	3	6	12	−6	7	Advance to knockout phase	1–4	—	1–1	1–0
3	(Belgium) Club Brugge	6	1	2	3	4	11	−7	5		0–1	1–3	—	1–0
4	(Poland) Legia Warsaw	6	1	1	4	4	10	−6	4		0–2	1–0	1–1	—

Source: Soccerway
Rules for classification: Group stage tiebreakers
17 September 2015
19:00

Midtjylland (Denmark)	1–0	(Poland) Legia Warsaw
Rasmussen 60'	Report

MCH Arena, Herning
Attendance: 6,798
Referee: Hüseyin Göçek (Turkey)
17 September 2015
19:00

Napoli (Italy)	5–0	(Belgium) Club Brugge
Callejón 5', 77'; Mertens 19', 25'; Hamšík 53'	Report

Stadio San Paolo, Naples
Attendance: 13,043
Referee: István Vad (Hungary)

1 October 2015
21:05

Club Brugge (Belgium)	1–3	(Denmark) Midtjylland
Meunier 79'	Report	Sisto 51'; Onuachu 67'; Novák 74'

Jan Breydel Stadium, Bruges
Attendance: 14,126
Referee: Steven McLean (Scotland)
1 October 2015
21:05

Legia Warsaw (Poland)	0–2	(Italy) Napoli
	Report	Mertens 53'; Higuaín 84'

Polish Army Stadium, Warsaw
Attendance: 26,357
Referee: Michael Koukoulakis (Greece)

22 October 2015
21:05

Legia Warsaw (Poland)	1–1	(Belgium) Club Brugge
Kucharczyk 51'	Report	De fauw 39'

Polish Army Stadium, Warsaw
Attendance: 16,320
Referee: Harald Lechner (Austria)
22 October 2015
21:05

Midtjylland (Denmark)	1–4	(Italy) Napoli
Pušić 43'	Report	Callejón 19'; Gabbiadini 31', 40'; Higuaín 90+4'

MCH Arena, Herning
Attendance: 9,210
Referee: Serdar Gözübüyük (Netherlands)

5 November 2015
19:00

Club Brugge (Belgium)	1–0	(Poland) Legia Warsaw
Meunier 38'	Report

Jan Breydel Stadium, Bruges
Attendance: 16,349
Referee: Marijo Strahonja (Croatia)
5 November 2015
19:00

Napoli (Italy)	5–0	(Denmark) Midtjylland
El Kaddouri 13'; Gabbiadini 23', 38'; Maggio 54'; Callejón 77'	Report

Stadio San Paolo, Naples
Attendance: 18,475
Referee: Benoît Bastien (France)

26 November 2015
21:05

Legia Warsaw (Poland)	1–0	(Denmark) Midtjylland
Prijović 35'	Report

Polish Army Stadium, Warsaw
Attendance: 9,468
Referee: Andre Marriner (England)
26 November 2015
21:05

Club Brugge (Belgium)	0–1	(Italy) Napoli
	Report	Chiricheș 41'

Jan Breydel Stadium, Bruges
Attendance: 180 (Note: The Club Brugge v Napoli match was played behind closed doors due to the security situation in Belgium in the aftermath of the November 2015 Paris attacks.)
Referee: Marius Avram (Romania)

10 December 2015
19:00

Midtjylland (Denmark)	1–1	(Belgium) Club Brugge
Sisto 27'	Report	Vossen 68'

MCH Arena, Herning
Attendance: 8,624
Referee: Javier Estrada Fernández (Spain)
10 December 2015
19:00

Napoli (Italy)	5–2	(Poland) Legia Warsaw
Chalobah 32'; Insigne 39'; Callejón 57'; Mertens 65', 90+1'	Report	Vranješ 62'; Prijović 90+2'

Stadio San Paolo, Naples
Attendance: 7,922
Referee: Aleksandar Stavrev (Macedonia)

=== Group E ===
Pos	Team	Pld	W	D	L	GF	GA	GD	Pts	Qualification	RW	VIL	PLZ	DMI
1	(Austria) Rapid Wien	6	5	0	1	10	6	+4	15	Advance to knockout phase	—	2–1	3–2	2–1
2	(Spain) Villarreal	6	4	1	1	12	6	+6	13	Advance to knockout phase	1–0	—	1–0	4–0
3	(Czech Republic) Viktoria Plzeň	6	1	1	4	8	10	−2	4		1–2	3–3	—	2–0
4	(Belarus) Dinamo Minsk	6	1	0	5	3	11	−8	3		0–1	1–2	1–0	—

Source: Soccerway
Rules for classification: Group stage tiebreakers
17 September 2015
19:00

Rapid Wien (Austria)	2–1	(Spain) Villarreal
Schwab 50'; S. Hofmann 53' (pen.)	Report	Baptistão 45'

Ernst-Happel-Stadion, Vienna
Attendance: 36,200
Referee: Stefan Johannesson (Sweden)
17 September 2015
19:00

Viktoria Plzeň (Czech Republic)	2–0	(Belarus) Dinamo Minsk
Hořava 36'; Petržela 75'	Report

Doosan Arena, Plzeň
Attendance: 10,784
Referee: Marius Avram (Romania)

1 October 2015
21:05

Dinamo Minsk (Belarus)	0–1	(Austria) Rapid Wien
	Report	S. Hofmann 54'

Borisov Arena, Barysaw (Note: Dinamo Minsk played their home matches at Borisov Arena, Barysaw, instead of their temporary stadium Traktor Stadium, Minsk.)
Attendance: 4,553
Referee: Jakob Kehlet (Denmark)
1 October 2015
21:05

Villarreal (Spain)	1–0	(Czech Republic) Viktoria Plzeň
Baptistão 54'	Report

El Madrigal, Villarreal
Attendance: 17,481
Referee: Serdar Gözübüyük (Netherlands)

22 October 2015
21:05

Villarreal (Spain)	4–0	(Belarus) Dinamo Minsk
Bakambu 17', 32'; Soldado 61'; Bailly 71'	Report

El Madrigal, Villarreal
Attendance: 14,025
Referee: Serhiy Boyko (Ukraine)
22 October 2015
21:05

Rapid Wien (Austria)	3–2	(Czech Republic) Viktoria Plzeň
S. Hofmann 34'; Schaub 52'; Petsos 68'	Report	Ďuriš 12'; Hrošovský 76'

Ernst-Happel-Stadion, Vienna
Attendance: 39,400
Referee: Craig Pawson (England)

5 November 2015
19:00

Dinamo Minsk (Belarus)	1–2	(Spain) Villarreal
Vitus 69'	Report	Soldado 72' (pen.); Palitsevich 86' (o.g.)

Borisov Arena, Barysaw
Attendance: 4,959
Referee: John Beaton (Scotland)
5 November 2015
19:00

Viktoria Plzeň (Czech Republic)	1–2	(Austria) Rapid Wien
Holenda 71'	Report	Schobesberger 13', 77'

Doosan Arena, Plzeň
Attendance: 11,691
Referee: Luca Banti (Italy)

26 November 2015
17:00

Dinamo Minsk (Belarus)	1–0	(Czech Republic) Viktoria Plzeň
Adamović 90+3'	Report

Borisov Arena, Barysaw
Attendance: 4,250
Referee: Ognjen Valjić (Bosnia and Herzegovina)
26 November 2015
21:05

Villarreal (Spain)	1–0	(Austria) Rapid Wien
Soriano 78'	Report

El Madrigal, Villarreal
Attendance: 14,760
Referee: Paweł Raczkowski (Poland)

10 December 2015
19:00

Rapid Wien (Austria)	2–1	(Belarus) Dinamo Minsk
M. Hofmann 29'; Jelić 59'	Report	El Monir 65'

Ernst-Happel-Stadion, Vienna
Attendance: 34,800
Referee: Aliyar Aghayev (Azerbaijan)
10 December 2015
19:00

Viktoria Plzeň (Czech Republic)	3–3	(Spain) Villarreal
Kolář 8' (pen.); Kovařík 65'; Hořava 90'	Report	Bakambu 40'; Jonathan 62'; Soriano 90+4'

Doosan Arena, Plzeň
Attendance: 10,071
Referee: Tony Chapron (France)

=== Group F ===
Pos	Team	Pld	W	D	L	GF	GA	GD	Pts	Qualification	BRA	MAR	LIB	GRO
1	(Portugal) Braga	6	4	1	1	7	4	+3	13	Advance to knockout phase	—	3–2	2–1	1–0
2	(France) Marseille	6	4	0	2	12	7	+5	12	Advance to knockout phase	1–0	—	0–1	2–1
3	(Czech Republic) Slovan Liberec	6	2	1	3	6	8	−2	7		0–1	2–4	—	1–1
4	(Netherlands) Groningen	6	0	2	4	2	8	−6	2		0–0	0–3	0–1	—

Source: Soccerway
Rules for classification: Group stage tiebreakers
17 September 2015
19:00

Slovan Liberec (Czech Republic)	0–1	(Portugal) Braga
	Report	Rafa 60'

Stadion u Nisy, Liberec
Attendance: 8,132
Referee: Craig Pawson (England)
17 September 2015
19:00

Groningen (Netherlands)	0–3	(France) Marseille
	Report	Nkoudou 25'; Ocampos 40'; Alessandrini 61'

Euroborg, Groningen
Attendance: 21,520
Referee: Yevhen Aranovsky (Ukraine)

1 October 2015
21:05

Marseille (France)	0–1	(Czech Republic) Slovan Liberec
	Report	Coufal 84'

Stade Vélodrome, Marseille
Attendance: 10,040
Referee: Aleksei Eskov (Russia)
1 October 2015
21:05

Braga (Portugal)	1–0	(Netherlands) Groningen
Hassan 5'	Report

Estádio Municipal, Braga
Attendance: 9,150
Referee: Bobby Madden (Scotland)

22 October 2015
21:05

Braga (Portugal)	3–2	(France) Marseille
Hassan 61'; Eduardo 77'; Alan 88'	Report	Alessandrini 84'; Batshuayi 87'

Estádio Municipal, Braga
Attendance: 10,495
Referee: Alexandru Tudor (Romania)
22 October 2015
21:05

Slovan Liberec (Czech Republic)	1–1	(Netherlands) Groningen
Luckassen 87'	Report	Hoesen 90+6'

Stadion u Nisy, Liberec
Attendance: 8,793
Referee: Christian Dingert (Germany)

5 November 2015
19:00

Marseille (France)	1–0	(Portugal) Braga
Nkoudou 39'	Report

Stade Vélodrome, Marseille
Attendance: 12,973
Referee: Hüseyin Göçek (Turkey)
5 November 2015
19:00

Groningen (Netherlands)	0–1	(Czech Republic) Slovan Liberec
	Report	Padt 81' (o.g.)

Euroborg, Groningen
Attendance: 18,693
Referee: Marcin Borski (Poland)

26 November 2015
21:05

Braga (Portugal)	2–1	(Czech Republic) Slovan Liberec
Ferreira 42'; Crislan 90+2'	Report	Efremov 35'

Estádio Municipal, Braga
Attendance: 8,144
Referee: Aleksei Kulbakov (Belarus)
26 November 2015
21:05

Marseille (France)	2–1	(Netherlands) Groningen
Nkoudou 28'; Batshuayi 88'	Report	Maduro 50'

Stade Vélodrome, Marseille
Attendance: 9,107
Referee: Andris Treimanis (Latvia)

10 December 2015
19:00

Slovan Liberec (Czech Republic)	2–4	(France) Marseille
Bakoš 75' (pen.); Šural 76'	Report	Batshuayi 14'; Nkoudou 43'; Barrada 48'; Ocampos 90+4'

Stadion u Nisy, Liberec
Attendance: 9,600
Referee: Robert Schörgenhofer (Austria)
10 December 2015
19:00

Groningen (Netherlands)	0–0	(Portugal) Braga
	Report

Euroborg, Groningen
Attendance: 15,715
Referee: Simon Lee Evans (Wales)

=== Group G ===
Pos	Team	Pld	W	D	L	GF	GA	GD	Pts	Qualification	LAZ	SET	DNI	ROS
1	(Italy) Lazio	6	4	2	0	13	6	+7	14	Advance to knockout phase	—	3–2	3–1	3–1
2	(France) Saint-Étienne	6	2	3	1	10	7	+3	9	Advance to knockout phase	1–1	—	3–0	2–2
3	(Ukraine) Dnipro Dnipropetrovsk	6	2	1	3	6	8	−2	7		1–1	0–1	—	3–0
4	(Norway) Rosenborg	6	0	2	4	4	12	−8	2		0–2	1–1	0–1	—

Source: Soccerway
Rules for classification: Group stage tiebreakers
17 September 2015
21:05

Dnipro Dnipropetrovsk (Ukraine)	1–1	(Italy) Lazio
Seleznyov 90+4'	Report	Milinković-Savić 34'

Dnipro-Arena, Dnipropetrovsk
Attendance: 150 (Note: The Dnipro Dnipropetrovsk v Lazio and Dnipro Dnipropetrovsk v Saint-Étienne matches were played behind closed doors due to punishment by UEFA.)
Referee: Arnold Hunter (Northern Ireland)
17 September 2015
21:05

Saint-Étienne (France)	2–2	(Norway) Rosenborg
Berić 4'; Roux 87' (pen.)	Report	Mikkelsen 16'; Svensson 78'

Stade Geoffroy-Guichard, Saint-Étienne
Attendance: 22,826
Referee: Christian Dingert (Germany)

1 October 2015
19:00

Rosenborg (Norway)	0–1	(Ukraine) Dnipro Dnipropetrovsk
	Report	Seleznyov 80'

Lerkendal Stadion, Trondheim
Attendance: 13,939
Referee: Sébastien Delferière (Belgium)
1 October 2015
19:00

Lazio (Italy)	3–2	(France) Saint-Étienne
Onazi 22'; Hoedt 48'; Biglia 80'	Report	Sall 6'; Monnet-Paquet 84'

Stadio Olimpico, Rome
Attendance: 11,039
Referee: Halis Özkahya (Turkey)

22 October 2015
19:00

Lazio (Italy)	3–1	(Norway) Rosenborg
Matri 28'; Felipe Anderson 54'; Candreva 79'	Report	Søderlund 69'

Stadio Olimpico, Rome
Attendance: 8,630
Referee: Paweł Gil (Poland)
22 October 2015
19:00

Dnipro Dnipropetrovsk (Ukraine)	0–1	(France) Saint-Étienne
	Report	Hamouma 44'

Dnipro-Arena, Dnipropetrovsk
Attendance: 225
Referee: Alon Yefet (Israel)

5 November 2015
21:05

Rosenborg (Norway)	0–2	(Italy) Lazio
	Report	Đorđević 9', 29'

Lerkendal Stadion, Trondheim
Attendance: 16,038
Referee: Andre Marriner (England)
5 November 2015
21:05

Saint-Étienne (France)	3–0	(Ukraine) Dnipro Dnipropetrovsk
Monnet-Paquet 38'; Berić 52'; Hamouma 65'	Report

Stade Geoffroy-Guichard, Saint-Étienne
Attendance: 24,582
Referee: Mattias Gestranius (Finland)

26 November 2015
19:00

Lazio (Italy)	3–1	(Ukraine) Dnipro Dnipropetrovsk
Candreva 4'; Parolo 68'; Đorđević 90+3'	Report	Gama 65'

Stadio Olimpico, Rome
Attendance: 3,058
Referee: Gediminas Mažeika (Lithuania)
26 November 2015
19:00

Rosenborg (Norway)	1–1	(France) Saint-Étienne
Søderlund 40'	Report	Roux 80' (pen.)

Lerkendal Stadion, Trondheim
Attendance: 15,038
Referee: Vitali Meshkov (Russia)

10 December 2015
21:05

Dnipro Dnipropetrovsk (Ukraine)	3–0	(Norway) Rosenborg
Matheus 35', 60'; Shakhov 79'	Report

Dnipro-Arena, Dnipropetrovsk
Attendance: 4,541
Referee: Stephan Klossner (Switzerland)
10 December 2015
21:05

Saint-Étienne (France)	1–1	(Italy) Lazio
Eysseric 76'	Report	Matri 52'

Stade Geoffroy-Guichard, Saint-Étienne
Attendance: 28,954
Referee: Kevin Blom (Netherlands)

=== Group H ===
Pos	Team	Pld	W	D	L	GF	GA	GD	Pts	Qualification	LMO	SPO	BES	SKE
1	(Russia) Lokomotiv Moscow	6	3	2	1	12	7	+5	11	Advance to knockout phase	—	2–4	1–1	2–0
2	(Portugal) Sporting CP	6	3	1	2	14	11	+3	10	Advance to knockout phase	1–3	—	3–1	5–1
3	(Turkey) Beşiktaş	6	2	3	1	7	6	+1	9		1–1	1–1	—	2–0
4	(Albania) Skënderbeu	6	1	0	5	4	13	−9	3		0–3	3–0	0–1	—

Source: Soccerway
Rules for classification: Group stage tiebreakers
17 September 2015
21:05

Sporting CP (Portugal)	1–3	(Russia) Lokomotiv Moscow
Montero 50'	Report	Samedov 12', 56'; Niasse 65'

Estádio José Alvalade, Lisbon
Attendance: 25,400
Referee: Robert Schörgenhofer (Austria)
17 September 2015
21:05

Skënderbeu (Albania)	0–1	(Turkey) Beşiktaş
	Report	Sosa 28'

Elbasan Arena, Elbasan (Note: Skënderbeu played their home matches at Elbasan Arena, Elbasan, instead of their regular stadium Skënderbeu Stadium, Korçë.)
Attendance: 5,482
Referee: Tamás Bognár (Hungary)

1 October 2015
19:00

Beşiktaş (Turkey)	1–1	(Portugal) Sporting CP
Töre 61'	Report	Ruiz 16'

Atatürk Olympic Stadium, Istanbul
Attendance: 25,827
Referee: Paolo Tagliavento (Italy)
1 October 2015
19:00

Lokomotiv Moscow (Russia)	2–0	(Albania) Skënderbeu
Niasse 35'; Samedov 73'	Report

Lokomotiv Stadium, Moscow
Attendance: 10,340
Referee: Orel Grinfeeld (Israel)

22 October 2015
19:00

Lokomotiv Moscow (Russia)	1–1	(Turkey) Beşiktaş
Maicon 54'	Report	Gómez 64'

Lokomotiv Stadium, Moscow
Attendance: 19,124
Referee: Serge Gumienny (Belgium)
22 October 2015
19:00

Sporting CP (Portugal)	5–1	(Albania) Skënderbeu
Aquilani 38' (pen.); Montero 41' (pen.); Matheus 64', 77'; Figueiredo 69'	Report	Jashanica 89'

Estádio José Alvalade, Lisbon
Attendance: 20,567
Referee: Clayton Pisani (Malta)

5 November 2015
17:00

Beşiktaş (Turkey)	1–1	(Russia) Lokomotiv Moscow
Quaresma 58'	Report	Niasse 76'

Atatürk Olympic Stadium, Istanbul
Attendance: 24,690
Referee: Felix Zwayer (Germany)
5 November 2015
21:05

Skënderbeu (Albania)	3–0	(Portugal) Sporting CP
Lilaj 15', 19' (pen.); Nimaga 55'	Report

Elbasan Arena, Elbasan
Attendance: 1,783
Referee: Kristo Tohver (Estonia)

26 November 2015
19:00

Lokomotiv Moscow (Russia)	2–4	(Portugal) Sporting CP
Maicon 5'; Miranchuk 86'	Report	Montero 20'; Ruiz 38'; Gelson 43'; Matheus 60'

Lokomotiv Stadium, Moscow
Attendance: 11,043
Referee: Antonio Mateu Lahoz (Spain)
26 November 2015
19:00

Beşiktaş (Turkey)	2–0	(Albania) Skënderbeu
Tosun 35', 78'	Report

Atatürk Olympic Stadium, Istanbul
Attendance: 11,155
Referee: Paweł Gil (Poland)

10 December 2015
21:05

Sporting CP (Portugal)	3–1	(Turkey) Beşiktaş
Slimani 67'; Ruiz 72'; Gutiérrez 78'	Report	Gómez 58'

Estádio José Alvalade, Lisbon
Attendance: 28,211
Referee: Manuel Gräfe (Germany)
10 December 2015
21:05

Skënderbeu (Albania)	0–3	(Russia) Lokomotiv Moscow
	Report	Tarasov 18'; Niasse 89'; Samedov 90'

Elbasan Arena, Elbasan
Attendance: 1,152
Referee: Marijo Strahonja (Croatia)

=== Group I ===
Pos	Team	Pld	W	D	L	GF	GA	GD	Pts	Qualification	BSL	FIO	LCH	BEL
1	(Switzerland) Basel	6	4	1	1	10	5	+5	13	Advance to knockout phase	—	2–2	2–0	1–2
2	(Italy) Fiorentina	6	3	1	2	11	6	+5	10	Advance to knockout phase	1–2	—	1–2	1–0
3	(Poland) Lech Poznań	6	1	2	3	2	6	−4	5		0–1	0–2	—	0–0
4	(Portugal) Belenenses	6	1	2	3	2	8	−6	5		0–2	0–4	0–0	—

Source: Soccerway
Rules for classification: Group stage tiebreakers
17 September 2015
21:05

Fiorentina (Italy)	1–2	(Switzerland) Basel
Kalinić 4'	Report	Bjarnason 71'; Elneny 79'

Stadio Artemio Franchi, Florence
Attendance: 15,212
Referee: Michael Oliver (England)
17 September 2015
21:05

Lech Poznań (Poland)	0–0	(Portugal) Belenenses
	Report

INEA Stadion, Poznań
Attendance: 7,934
Referee: Serhiy Boyko (Ukraine)

1 October 2015
19:00

Belenenses (Portugal)	0–4	(Italy) Fiorentina
	Report	Bernardeschi 18'; Babacar 45+1'; Tonel 83' (o.g.); Rossi 90'

Estádio do Restelo, Lisbon
Attendance: 6,886
Referee: Aleksandar Stavrev (Macedonia)
1 October 2015
19:00

Basel (Switzerland)	2–0	(Poland) Lech Poznań
Bjarnason 55'; Embolo 90'	Report

St. Jakob-Park, Basel
Attendance: 17,567
Referee: Ognjen Valjić (Bosnia and Herzegovina)

22 October 2015
19:00

Basel (Switzerland)	1–2	(Portugal) Belenenses
Lang 15'	Report	Leal 27'; Kuca 45+1'

St. Jakob-Park, Basel
Attendance: 17,275
Referee: Simon Lee Evans (Wales)
22 October 2015
19:00

Fiorentina (Italy)	1–2	(Poland) Lech Poznań
Rossi 90'	Report	Kownacki 65'; Gajos 82'

Stadio Artemio Franchi, Florence
Attendance: 13,792
Referee: Gediminas Mažeika (Lithuania)

5 November 2015
21:05

Belenenses (Portugal)	0–2	(Switzerland) Basel
	Report	Janko 45+1' (pen.); Embolo 64'

Estádio do Restelo, Lisbon
Attendance: 4,802
Referee: Tamás Bognár (Hungary)
5 November 2015
21:05

Lech Poznań (Poland)	0–2	(Italy) Fiorentina
	Report	Iličić 42', 83'

INEA Stadion, Poznań
Attendance: 22,343
Referee: Halis Özkahya (Turkey)

26 November 2015
19:00

Basel (Switzerland)	2–2	(Italy) Fiorentina
Suchý 40'; Elneny 74'	Report	Bernardeschi 23', 36'

St. Jakob-Park, Basel
Attendance: 22,550
Referee: Ivan Kružliak (Slovakia)
26 November 2015
19:00

Belenenses (Portugal)	0–0	(Poland) Lech Poznań
	Report

Estádio do Restelo, Lisbon
Attendance: 1,987
Referee: Arnold Hunter (Northern Ireland)

10 December 2015
21:05

Fiorentina (Italy)	1–0	(Portugal) Belenenses
Babacar 67'	Report

Stadio Artemio Franchi, Florence
Attendance: 12,756
Referee: Vladislav Bezborodov (Russia)
10 December 2015
21:05

Lech Poznań (Poland)	0–1	(Switzerland) Basel
	Report	Boëtius 50'

INEA Stadion, Poznań
Attendance: 10,457
Referee: Bobby Madden (Scotland)

=== Group J ===
Pos	Team	Pld	W	D	L	GF	GA	GD	Pts	Qualification	TOT	AND	MON	QAR
1	(England) Tottenham Hotspur	6	4	1	1	12	6	+6	13	Advance to knockout phase	—	2–1	4–1	3–1
2	(Belgium) Anderlecht	6	3	1	2	8	6	+2	10	Advance to knockout phase	2–1	—	1–1	2–1
3	(France) Monaco	6	1	3	2	5	9	−4	6		1–1	0–2	—	1–0
4	(Azerbaijan) Qarabağ	6	1	1	4	4	8	−4	4		0–1	1–0	1–1	—

Source: Soccerway
Rules for classification: Group stage tiebreakers
17 September 2015
21:05

Anderlecht (Belgium)	1–1	(France) Monaco
Gillet 11'	Report	L. Traoré 85'

Constant Vanden Stock Stadium, Brussels
Attendance: 15,576
Referee: Miroslav Zelinka (Czech Republic)
17 September 2015
21:05

Tottenham Hotspur (England)	3–1	(Azerbaijan) Qarabağ
Son Heung-min 28', 30'; Lamela 86'	Report	Almeida 7' (pen.)

White Hart Lane, London
Attendance: 26,463
Referee: Adrien Jaccottet (Switzerland)

1 October 2015
19:00

Qarabağ (Azerbaijan)	1–0	(Belgium) Anderlecht
Almeida 36'	Report

Tofiq Bahramov Republican Stadium, Baku
Attendance: 25,000
Referee: Oliver Drachta (Austria)
1 October 2015
19:00

Monaco (France)	1–1	(England) Tottenham Hotspur
El Shaarawy 81'	Report	Lamela 35'

Stade Louis II, Monaco
Attendance: 7,216
Referee: Artur Soares Dias (Portugal)

22 October 2015
19:00

Monaco (France)	1–0	(Azerbaijan) Qarabağ
L. Traoré 70'	Report

Stade Louis II, Monaco
Attendance: 6,165
Referee: Jakob Kehlet (Denmark)
22 October 2015
19:00

Anderlecht (Belgium)	2–1	(England) Tottenham Hotspur
Gillet 13'; Okaka 75'	Report	Eriksen 4'

Constant Vanden Stock Stadium, Brussels
Attendance: 18,504
Referee: Pol van Boekel (Netherlands)

5 November 2015
17:00

Qarabağ (Azerbaijan)	1–1	(France) Monaco
Armenteros 39'	Report	Cavaleiro 72'

Tofiq Bahramov Republican Stadium, Baku
Attendance: 30,200
Referee: Cristian Balaj (Romania)
5 November 2015
21:05

Tottenham Hotspur (England)	2–1	(Belgium) Anderlecht
Kane 29'; Dembélé 87'	Report	Ezekiel 72'

White Hart Lane, London
Attendance: 33,479
Referee: Orel Grinfeeld (Israel)

26 November 2015
19:00

Monaco (France)	0–2	(Belgium) Anderlecht
	Report	Gillet 45+1'; Acheampong 78'

Stade Louis II, Monaco
Attendance: 5,913
Referee: Manuel Gräfe (Germany)
26 November 2015
19:00

Qarabağ (Azerbaijan)	0–1	(England) Tottenham Hotspur
	Report	Kane 78'

Tofiq Bahramov Republican Stadium, Baku
Attendance: 28,000
Referee: Anastasios Sidiropoulos (Greece)

10 December 2015
21:05

Anderlecht (Belgium)	2–1	(Azerbaijan) Qarabağ
Najar 28'; Okaka 31'	Report	Quintana 26'

Constant Vanden Stock Stadium, Brussels
Attendance: 16,075
Referee: Slavko Vinčić (Slovenia)
10 December 2015
21:05

Tottenham Hotspur (England)	4–1	(France) Monaco
Lamela 2', 15', 38'; Carroll 78'	Report	El Shaarawy 61'

White Hart Lane, London
Attendance: 34,122
Referee: Ivan Bebek (Croatia)

=== Group K ===
Pos	Team	Pld	W	D	L	GF	GA	GD	Pts	Qualification	SCH	SPP	AT	APO
1	(Germany) Schalke 04	6	4	2	0	15	3	+12	14	Advance to knockout phase	—	2–2	4–0	1–0
2	(Czech Republic) Sparta Prague	6	3	3	0	10	5	+5	12	Advance to knockout phase	1–1	—	1–0	2–0
3	(Greece) Asteras Tripolis	6	1	1	4	4	12	−8	4		0–4	1–1	—	2–0
4	(Cyprus) APOEL	6	1	0	5	3	12	−9	3		0–3	1–3	2–1	—

Source: Soccerway
Rules for classification: Group stage tiebreakers
17 September 2015
21:05

APOEL (Cyprus)	0–3	(Germany) Schalke 04
	Report	Matip 28'; Huntelaar 35', 71'

GSP Stadium, Nicosia
Attendance: 13,512
Referee: Tony Chapron (France)
17 September 2015
21:05

Asteras Tripolis (Greece)	1–1	(Czech Republic) Sparta Prague
Mazza 2'	Report	Lafata 56'

Theodoros Kolokotronis Stadium, Tripoli
Attendance: 2,984
Referee: Marijo Strahonja (Croatia)

1 October 2015
19:00

Sparta Prague (Czech Republic)	2–0	(Cyprus) APOEL
Fatai 24'; Brabec 60'	Report

Generali Arena, Prague
Attendance: 9,130
Referee: Paweł Gil (Poland)
1 October 2015
19:00

Schalke 04 (Germany)	4–0	(Greece) Asteras Tripolis
Di Santo 28', 37', 44' (pen.); Huntelaar 84'	Report

Veltins-Arena, Gelsenkirchen
Attendance: 42,447
Referee: Pol van Boekel (Netherlands)

22 October 2015
19:00

Schalke 04 (Germany)	2–2	(Czech Republic) Sparta Prague
Di Santo 6'; Sané 73'	Report	Fatai 50'; Lafata 63'

Veltins-Arena, Gelsenkirchen
Attendance: 51,244
Referee: Artur Soares Dias (Portugal)
22 October 2015
19:00

APOEL (Cyprus)	2–1	(Greece) Asteras Tripolis
Cavenaghi 45+9' (pen.); Carlão 59'	Report	Lluy 8'

GSP Stadium, Nicosia
Attendance: 12,783
Referee: Aleksei Eskov (Russia)

5 November 2015
21:05

Sparta Prague (Czech Republic)	1–1	(Germany) Schalke 04
Lafata 6'	Report	Geis 20' (pen.)

Generali Arena, Prague
Attendance: 17,352
Referee: Carlos Clos Gómez (Spain)
5 November 2015
21:05

Asteras Tripolis (Greece)	2–0	(Cyprus) APOEL
Bertoglio 2'; Giannou 45+1'	Report

Theodoros Kolokotronis Stadium, Tripoli
Attendance: 3,624
Referee: Oliver Drachta (Austria)

26 November 2015
19:00

Schalke 04 (Germany)	1–0	(Cyprus) APOEL
Choupo-Moting 86'	Report

Veltins-Arena, Gelsenkirchen
Attendance: 43,117
Referee: Andreas Ekberg (Sweden)
26 November 2015
19:00

Sparta Prague (Czech Republic)	1–0	(Greece) Asteras Tripolis
Brabec 33'	Report

Generali Arena, Prague
Attendance: 10,140
Referee: Michael Oliver (England)

10 December 2015
21:05

APOEL (Cyprus)	1–3	(Czech Republic) Sparta Prague
Cavenaghi 6'	Report	Juliš 63'; Lafata 77', 87'

GSP Stadium, Nicosia
Attendance: 5,940
Referee: István Vad (Hungary)
10 December 2015
21:05

Asteras Tripolis (Greece)	0–4	(Germany) Schalke 04
	Report	Di Santo 29'; Choupo-Moting 37', 78'; Meyer 86'

Theodoros Kolokotronis Stadium, Tripoli
Attendance: 2,501
Referee: Liran Liany (Israel)

=== Group L ===
Pos	Team	Pld	W	D	L	GF	GA	GD	Pts	Qualification	ATH	AUG	PAR	AZ
1	(Spain) Athletic Bilbao	6	4	1	1	16	8	+8	13	Advance to knockout phase	—	3–1	5–1	2–2
2	(Germany) FC Augsburg	6	3	0	3	12	11	+1	9	Advance to knockout phase	2–3	—	1–3	4–1
3	(Serbia) Partizan	6	3	0	3	10	14	−4	9		0–2	1–3	—	3–2
4	(Netherlands) AZ	6	1	1	4	8	13	−5	4		2–1	0–1	1–2	—

Source: Soccerway
Rules for classification: Group stage tiebreakers
17 September 2015
21:05

Partizan (Serbia)	3–2	(Netherlands) AZ
Oumarou 11', 40'; A. Živković 89'	Report	Van der Linden 34'; Henriksen 90+3'

Partizan Stadium, Belgrade
Attendance: 7,949
Referee: Daniele Orsato (Italy)
17 September 2015
21:05

Athletic Bilbao (Spain)	3–1	(Germany) FC Augsburg
Aduriz 55', 66'; Susaeta 90'	Report	Altıntop 15'

San Mamés, Bilbao
Attendance: 37,838
Referee: Vladislav Bezborodov (Russia)

1 October 2015
19:00

FC Augsburg (Germany)	1–3	(Serbia) Partizan
Bobadilla 58'	Report	A. Živković 31', 62'; Fabrício 54'

WWK ARENA, Augsburg
Attendance: 22,948
Referee: Alexandru Tudor (Romania)
1 October 2015
19:00

AZ (Netherlands)	2–1	(Spain) Athletic Bilbao
Henriksen 55'; Bóveda 65' (o.g.)	Report	Aduriz 75'

AFAS Stadion, Alkmaar
Attendance: 11,434
Referee: Ivan Kružliak (Slovakia)

22 October 2015
19:00

AZ (Netherlands)	0–1	(Germany) FC Augsburg
	Report	Trochowski 43'

AFAS Stadion, Alkmaar
Attendance: 16,511
Referee: Miroslav Zelinka (Czech Republic)
22 October 2015
19:00

Partizan (Serbia)	0–2	(Spain) Athletic Bilbao
	Report	García 32'; Beñat 85'

Partizan Stadium, Belgrade
Attendance: 11,128
Referee: Paweł Raczkowski (Poland)

5 November 2015
21:05

FC Augsburg (Germany)	4–1	(Netherlands) AZ
Bobadilla 24', 33', 74'; Ji Dong-won 66'	Report	Janssen 45+1'

WWK ARENA, Augsburg
Attendance: 24,241
Referee: Bobby Madden (Scotland)
5 November 2015
21:05

Athletic Bilbao (Spain)	5–1	(Serbia) Partizan
Williams 15', 19'; Beñat 40'; Aduriz 71'; Elustondo 81'	Report	Oumarou 17'

San Mamés, Bilbao
Attendance: 39,849
Referee: Michael Koukoulakis (Greece)

26 November 2015
19:00

AZ (Netherlands)	1–2	(Serbia) Partizan
Dabney 48'	Report	Oumarou 65'; A. Živković 89'

AFAS Stadion, Alkmaar
Attendance: 12,784
Referee: Harald Lechner (Austria)
26 November 2015
19:00

FC Augsburg (Germany)	2–3	(Spain) Athletic Bilbao
Trochowski 41'; Bobadilla 59'	Report	Susaeta 10'; Aduriz 83', 86'

WWK ARENA, Augsburg
Attendance: 23,741
Referee: Artur Soares Dias (Portugal)

10 December 2015
21:05

Partizan (Serbia)	1–3	(Germany) FC Augsburg
Oumarou 11'	Report	Hong Jeong-ho 45+2'; Verhaegh 51'; Bobadilla 89'

Partizan Stadium, Belgrade
Attendance: 14,132
Referee: Paolo Tagliavento (Italy)
10 December 2015
21:05

Athletic Bilbao (Spain)	2–2	(Netherlands) AZ
Sola 43'; San José 47' (pen.)	Report	Van Overeem 26'; Saborit 88' (o.g.)

San Mamés, Bilbao
Attendance: 29,483
Referee: Benoît Bastien (France)
