= 2015–16 UEFA Europa League =

45th season of Europe's secondary club football tournament organised by UEFA

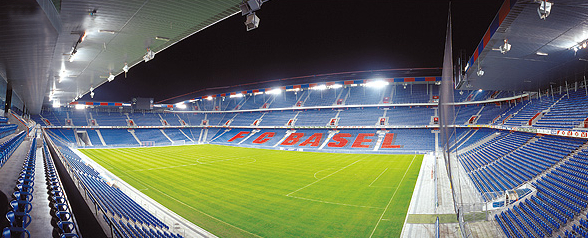
- The St. Jakob-Park in Basel hosted the final

Tournament details
- Dates: Qualifying: 30 June – 27 August 2015; Competition proper: 17 September 2015 – 18 May 2016
- Teams: Competition proper: 48+8; Total: 158+33 (from 54 associations)

Final positions
- Champions: (Spain) Sevilla (5th title)
- Runners-up: (England) Liverpool

Tournament statistics
- Matches played: 205
- Goals scored: 536 (2.61 per match)
- Attendance: 4,487,160 (21,889 per match)
- Top scorer(s): Aritz Aduriz (Athletic Bilbao); 10 goals

The 2015–16 UEFA Europa League was the 45th season of Europe's secondary club football tournament organised by UEFA, and the seventh season since it was renamed from the UEFA Cup to the UEFA Europa League.

The final was played between Liverpool and Sevilla at the St. Jakob-Park in Basel, Switzerland, and won by Sevilla, their fifth title (extending their own record) and third win in a row (also a tournament record).

Sevilla initially started the 2015–16 European club season in the Champions League as the Europa League title holders, but qualified for the Europa League by finishing third in the Champions League group stage, and successfully defended their title. As the winners of the 2015–16 UEFA Europa League, they qualified for the 2016–17 UEFA Champions League, and also earned the right to play against the winners of the 2015–16 UEFA Champions League, Real Madrid, in the 2016 UEFA Super Cup.

== Format changes ==
The UEFA Executive Committee held in May and September 2013 approved the following changes to the UEFA Europa League starting from the 2015–16 season (for the three-year cycle until the 2017–18 season):

- The title holders of the UEFA Europa League will qualify for the UEFA Champions League, and therefore no Europa League berth will be reserved for them (although it is still possible for them to defend their title if they drop down to the Europa League after Champions League elimination).
- All associations will have a maximum of three teams entering the Europa League (excluding those transferred from the Champions League); previously associations 7–9 each had four entrants (the only exception is when both the Champions League title holders and the Europa League title holders are from the same top three ranked association and do not qualify for either the Champions League or Europa League through domestic competitions, and the fourth-placed team of their association enter the Europa League instead of the Champions League because a maximum of five teams from one association can enter the Champions League, meaning in this case, four teams from their association enter the Europa League).
- The number of teams directly qualifying for the group stage will be increased to 16 teams (from the top 12 associations); previously six teams (from the top six associations) directly qualified for the group stage.
- Should the domestic cup winners qualify for the Champions League or Europa League through league performance, the cup runners-up will no longer be granted a spot in the Europa League, and the spot will be given to the highest-placed team in the league which have not yet qualified for European competitions.

== Association team allocation ==
A total of 191 teams from all 54 UEFA member associations participated in the 2015–16 UEFA Europa League. The association ranking based on the UEFA country coefficients was used to determine the number of participating teams for each association:

- Associations 1–51 (except Liechtenstein) each had three teams qualify.
  - As the winners of the 2014–15 UEFA Europa League, Sevilla qualified for the 2015–16 UEFA Champions League; the 2015–16 UEFA Europa League berth they would otherwise have earned for finishing fifth in the 2014–15 La Liga was vacated and not passed to another Spanish team.
- Associations 52–53 each had two teams qualify.
- Liechtenstein and Gibraltar each had one team qualify (Liechtenstein organised only a domestic cup and no domestic league; Gibraltar as per decision by the UEFA Executive Committee).
- The top three associations of the 2014–15 UEFA Respect Fair Play ranking each gained an additional berth (the 2015–16 season was the last where Fair Play berths were allocated to the Europa League).
- Moreover, 33 teams eliminated from the 2015–16 UEFA Champions League were transferred to the Europa League.

=== Association ranking ===
For the 2015–16 UEFA Europa League, the associations were allocated places according to their 2014 UEFA country coefficients, which took into account their performance in European competitions from 2009–10 to 2013–14.

Apart from the allocation based on the country coefficients, associations could have additional teams participating in the Europa League, as noted below:

- (FP) – Additional berth via Fair Play ranking (Netherlands, England, Republic of Ireland)
- (CL) – Additional teams transferred from Champions League
- (EL) – Vacated berth due to Europa League title holders playing in Champions League

Rank	Association	Coeff.	Teams	Notes
1	Spain	97.713	3	−1(EL) +2(CL)
2	England	84.748	3	+1(FP) +1(CL)
3	Germany	81.641	3	+1(CL)
4	Italy	66.938	3	+1(CL)
5	Portugal	62.299	3	+2(CL)
6	France	56.500	3	+1(CL)
7	Russia	46.998	3	
8	Netherlands	44.312	3	+1(FP) +1(CL)
9	Ukraine	40.966	3	+1(CL)
10	Belgium	36.300	3	+1(CL)
11	Turkey	34.200	3	+2(CL)
12	Greece	33.600	3	+2(CL)
13	Switzerland	33.225	3	+2(CL)
14	Austria	30.925	3	+2(CL)
15	Czech Republic	29.350	3	+2(CL)
16	Romania	27.257	3	+1(CL)
17	Israel	26.875	3	
18	Cyprus	23.250	3	+1(CL)

Rank	Association	Coeff.	Teams	Notes
19	Denmark	21.300	3	+1(CL)
20	Croatia	19.625	3	
21	Poland	18.875	3	+1(CL)
22	Belarus	18.625	3	
23	Scotland	16.566	3	+1(CL)
24	Sweden	16.325	3	
25	Bulgaria	15.625	3	
26	Norway	14.275	3	+1(CL)
27	Serbia	14.125	3	+1(CL)
28	Hungary	11.625	3	+1(CL)
29	Slovenia	11.000	3	
30	Slovakia	11.000	3	
31	Moldova	10.375	3	+1(CL)
32	Azerbaijan	10.375	3	+1(CL)
33	Georgia	9.875	3	
34	Kazakhstan	8.250	3	
35	Bosnia and Herzegovina	7.500	3	
36	Finland	7.175	3	+1(CL)

Rank	Association	Coeff.	Teams	Notes
37	Iceland	6.750	3	
38	Latvia	6.250	3	
39	Montenegro	6.000	3	
40	Albania	5.500	3	+1(CL)
41	Lithuania	5.250	3	
42	Macedonia	5.250	3	
43	Republic of Ireland	5.125	3	+1(FP)
44	Luxembourg	4.875	3	
45	Malta	4.833	3	
46	Liechtenstein	4.500	1	
47	Northern Ireland	3.625	3	
48	Wales	3.000	3	
49	Armenia	2.875	3	
50	Estonia	2.875	3	
51	Faroe Islands	2.125	3	
52	San Marino	0.999	2	
53	Andorra	0.833	2	
54	Gibraltar	0.000	1	

=== Distribution ===
In the default access list, Sevilla entered the group stage (as the fifth-placed team of the 2014–15 La Liga). However, since they qualified for the Champions League as the Europa League title holders, the spot which they qualified for in the Europa League group stage was vacated, and the following changes to the default allocation system were made:

- The domestic cup winners of association 13 (Switzerland) were promoted from the third qualifying round to the group stage.
- The domestic cup winners of association 18 (Cyprus) were promoted from the second qualifying round to the third qualifying round.
- The domestic cup winners of associations 24 (Sweden) and 25 (Bulgaria) were promoted from the first qualifying round to the second qualifying round.

	Teams entering in this round	Teams advancing from previous round	Teams transferred from Champions League
First qualifying round (102 teams)	29 domestic cup winners from associations 26–54; 35 domestic league runners-up from associations 18–53 (except Liechtenstein); 35 domestic league third-placed teams from associations 16–51 (except Liechtenstein); 3 teams which qualified via Fair Play ranking		
Second qualifying round (66 teams)	7 domestic cup winners from associations 19–25; 2 domestic league runners-up from associations 16–17; 6 domestic league fourth-placed teams from associations 10–15	51 winners from first qualifying round	
Third qualifying round (58 teams)	5 domestic cup winners from associations 14–18; 9 domestic league third-placed teams from associations 7–15; 5 domestic league fourth-placed teams from associations 5–9; 3 domestic league fifth-placed teams from associations 4–6 (League Cup winners for France); 3 domestic league sixth-placed teams from associations 1–3 (League Cup winners for England)	33 winners from second qualifying round	
Play-off round (44 teams)		29 winners from third qualifying round	15 losers from Champions League third qualifying round
Group stage (48 teams)	13 domestic cup winners from associations 1–13; 1 domestic league fourth-placed team from association 4; 2 domestic league fifth-placed teams from associations 1–3 (except Europa League title holders)	22 winners from play-off round	10 losers from Champions League play-off round
Knockout phase (32 teams)		12 group winners from group stage; 12 group runners-up from group stage	8 third-placed teams from Champions League group stage

==== Redistribution rules ====
A Europa League place was vacated when a team qualified for both the Champions League and the Europa League, or qualified for the Europa League by more than one method. When a place was vacated, it was redistributed within the national association by the following rules (regulations Articles 3.03 and 3.04):

- When the domestic cup winners (considered as the "highest-placed" qualifier within the national association with the latest starting round) also qualified for the Champions League, their Europa League place was vacated. As a result, the highest-placed team in the league which had not yet qualified for European competitions qualified for the Europa League, with the Europa League qualifiers which finished above them in the league moved up one "place" (the 2015–16 season was the first with this particular arrangement where the domestic cup runners-up were no longer guaranteed a place in the Europa League in this scenario).
- When the domestic cup winners also qualified for the Europa League through league position, their place through the league position was vacated. As a result, the highest-placed team in the league which had not yet qualified for European competitions qualified for the Europa League, with the Europa League qualifiers which finished above them in the league moved up one "place" if possible.
- For associations where a Europa League place was reserved for the League Cup winners, they always qualified for the Europa League as the "lowest-placed" qualifier. If the League Cup winners had already qualified for European competitions through other methods, this reserved Europa League place was taken by the highest-placed team in the league which had not yet qualified for European competitions.
- A Fair Play place was taken by the highest-ranked team in the domestic Fair Play table which had not yet qualified for European competitions.

=== Teams ===
The labels in the parentheses show how each team qualified for the place of its starting round:

- TH: Title holders
- CW: Cup winners
- 2nd, 3rd, 4th, 5th, 6th, etc.: League position
- LC: League Cup winners
- PW: End-of-season Europa League play-off winners
- FP: Fair Play
- CL: Transferred from Champions League
  - GS: Third-placed teams from group stage
  - PO: Losers from play-off round
  - Q3: Losers from third qualifying round

Round of 32
(Ukraine) Shakhtar Donetsk (CL GS)	(Turkey) Galatasaray (CL GS)	(Germany) Bayer Leverkusen (CL GS)	(Portugal) Porto (CL GS)
(England) Manchester United (CL GS)	(Spain) Sevilla^{TH} (CL GS)	(Greece) Olympiacos (CL GS)	(Spain) Valencia (CL GS)
Group stage
(Spain) Villarreal (6th)	(Portugal) Braga (4th)	(Greece) Asteras Tripolis (3rd)	(Italy) Lazio (CL PO)
(England) Tottenham Hotspur (5th)	(France) Marseille (4th)	(Switzerland) Sion (CW)	(Belgium) Club Brugge (CL PO)
(England) Liverpool (6th)	(Russia) Lokomotiv Moscow (CW)	(Cyprus) APOEL (CL PO)	(Portugal) Sporting CP (CL PO)
(Germany) FC Augsburg (5th)	(Netherlands) Groningen (CW)	(Albania) Skënderbeu (CL PO)	(Austria) Rapid Wien (CL PO)
(Germany) Schalke 04 (6th)	(Ukraine) Dnipro Dnipropetrovsk (3rd)	(Scotland) Celtic (CL PO)	(France) Monaco (CL PO)
(Italy) Fiorentina (4th)	(Belgium) Anderlecht (3rd)	(Switzerland) Basel (CL PO)	
(Italy) Napoli (5th)	(Turkey) Beşiktaş (3rd)	(Serbia) Partizan (CL PO)	
Play-off round
(Poland) Lech Poznań (CL Q3)	(Romania) Steaua București (CL Q3)	(Hungary) Videoton (CL Q3)	(Czech Republic) Sparta Prague (CL Q3)
(Moldova) Milsami Orhei (CL Q3)	(Denmark) Midtjylland (CL Q3)	(Austria) Red Bull Salzburg (CL Q3)	(Netherlands) Ajax (CL Q3)
(Finland) HJK (CL Q3)	(Czech Republic) Viktoria Plzeň (CL Q3)	(Greece) Panathinaikos (CL Q3)	(Turkey) Fenerbahçe (CL Q3)
(Azerbaijan) Qarabağ (CL Q3)	(Norway) Molde (CL Q3)	(Switzerland) Young Boys (CL Q3)	
Third qualifying round
(Spain) Athletic Bilbao (7th)	(France) Bordeaux (6th)	(Belgium) Standard Liège (4th)	(Czech Republic) Jablonec (3rd)
(England) Southampton (7th)	(Russia) Krasnodar (3rd)	(Turkey) İstanbul Başakşehir (4th)	(Romania) Târgu Mureș (2nd)
(Germany) Borussia Dortmund (7th)	(Russia) Rubin Kazan (5th)	(Greece) Atromitos (4th)	(Israel) Ironi Kiryat Shmona (2nd)
(Italy) Sampdoria (7th)	(Netherlands) AZ (3rd)	(Switzerland) Zürich (3rd)	(Cyprus) AEK Larnaca (2nd)
(Portugal) Vitória de Guimarães (5th)	(Netherlands) Vitesse (PW)	(Austria) Rheindorf Altach (3rd)	
(Portugal) Belenenses (6th)	(Ukraine) Zorya Luhansk (4th)	(Austria) Sturm Graz (4th)	
(France) Saint-Étienne (5th)	(Ukraine) Vorskla Poltava (5th)	(Czech Republic) Slovan Liberec (CW)	
Second qualifying round
(Belgium) Charleroi (PW)	(Austria) Wolfsberger AC (5th)	(Denmark) Copenhagen (CW)	(Scotland) Inverness CT (CW)
(Turkey) Trabzonspor (5th)	(Czech Republic) Mladá Boleslav (4th)	(Croatia) Rijeka (2nd)	(Sweden) IFK Göteborg (CW)
(Greece) PAOK (5th)	(Romania) Astra Giurgiu (4th)	(Poland) Legia Warsaw (CW)	(Bulgaria) Cherno More (CW)
(Switzerland) Thun (4th)	(Israel) Hapoel Be'er Sheva (3rd)	(Belarus) Dinamo Minsk (2nd)	
First qualifying round
(Romania) Botoșani (8th)	(Hungary) Debrecen (4th)	(Iceland) FH (2nd)	(Liechtenstein) Vaduz (CW)
(Israel) Beitar Jerusalem (4th)	(Slovenia) Koper (CW)	(Iceland) Víkingur Reykjavík (4th)	(Northern Ireland) Glentoran (CW)
(Cyprus) Apollon Limassol (3rd)	(Slovenia) Celje (2nd)	(Latvia) Jelgava (CW)	(Northern Ireland) Linfield (2nd)
(Cyprus) Omonia (4th)	(Slovenia) Domžale (3rd)	(Latvia) Skonto (2nd)	(Northern Ireland) Glenavon (3rd)
(Denmark) Brøndby (3rd)	(Slovakia) Žilina (2nd)	(Latvia) Spartaks Jūrmala (6th)	(Wales) Bala Town (2nd)
(Denmark) Randers (4th)	(Slovakia) Slovan Bratislava (3rd)	(Montenegro) Mladost Podgorica (CW)	(Wales) Airbus UK Broughton (3rd)
(Croatia) Hajduk Split (3rd)	(Slovakia) Spartak Trnava (4th)	(Montenegro) Sutjeska (2nd)	(Wales) Newtown (PW)
(Croatia) Lokomotiva Zagreb (4th)	(Moldova) Sheriff Tiraspol (CW)	(Montenegro) Budućnost Podgorica (3rd)	(Armenia) Ulisses (2nd)
(Poland) Jagiellonia Białystok (3rd)	(Moldova) Dacia Chișinău (2nd)	(Albania) Laçi (CW)	(Armenia) Shirak (3rd)
(Poland) Śląsk Wrocław (4th)	(Moldova) Saxan (5th)	(Albania) Kukësi (2nd)	(Armenia) Alashkert (4th)
(Belarus) Shakhtyor Soligorsk (3rd)	(Azerbaijan) Inter Baku (2nd)	(Albania) Partizani (3rd)	(Estonia) Nõmme Kalju (CW)
(Belarus) Torpedo-BelAZ Zhodino (4th)	(Azerbaijan) Gabala (3rd)	(Lithuania) Kruoja Pakruojis (2nd)	(Estonia) Sillamäe Kalev (2nd)
(Scotland) Aberdeen (2nd)	(Azerbaijan) Neftçi (4th)	(Lithuania) Atlantas (3rd)	(Estonia) Flora (3rd)
(Scotland) St Johnstone (4th)	(Georgia (country)) Dinamo Tbilisi (CW)	(Lithuania) Trakai (4th)	(Faroe Islands) Víkingur Gøta (CW)
(Sweden) AIK (3rd)	(Georgia (country)) Dinamo Batumi (2nd)	(North Macedonia) Rabotnicki (CW)	(Faroe Islands) HB (2nd)
(Sweden) IF Elfsborg (4th)	(Georgia (country)) Tskhinvali (4th)	(North Macedonia) Shkëndija (3rd)	(Faroe Islands) NSÍ (4th)
(Bulgaria) Beroe Stara Zagora (2nd)	(Kazakhstan) Kairat (CW)	(North Macedonia) Renova (4th)	(San Marino) Juvenes/Dogana (2nd)
(Bulgaria) Litex Lovech (4th)	(Kazakhstan) Aktobe (2nd)	(Republic of Ireland) St Patrick's Athletic (CW)	(San Marino) La Fiorita (3rd)
(Norway) Rosenborg (2nd)	(Kazakhstan) Ordabasy (4th)	(Republic of Ireland) Cork City (2nd)	(Andorra) Sant Julià (CW)
(Norway) Odd (3rd)	(Bosnia and Herzegovina) Olimpic (CW)	(Republic of Ireland) Shamrock Rovers (4th)	(Andorra) Lusitanos (2nd)
(Norway) Strømsgodset (4th)	(Bosnia and Herzegovina) Željezničar (2nd)	(Luxembourg) Differdange 03 (CW)	(Gibraltar) Europa (2nd)
(Serbia) Čukarički (CW)	(Bosnia and Herzegovina) Zrinjski Mostar (3rd)	(Luxembourg) F91 Dudelange (3rd)	(Netherlands) Go Ahead Eagles (FP)
(Serbia) Red Star Belgrade (2nd)	(Finland) SJK (2nd)	(Luxembourg) Progrès Niederkorn (4th)	(England) West Ham United (FP)
(Serbia) Vojvodina (4th)	(Finland) Lahti (3rd)	(Malta) Birkirkara (CW)	(Republic of Ireland) UCD (FP)
(Hungary) Ferencváros (CW)	(Finland) VPS (4th)	(Malta) Valletta (2nd)	
(Hungary) MTK Budapest (3rd)	(Iceland) KR (CW)	(Malta) Balzan (4th)	

Notably two teams took part in the competition that were not playing in their national top-division. They were Go Ahead Eagles (2nd tier) and UCD (2nd tier).

Notes

1. Bulgaria (BUL): Lokomotiv Sofia, the third-placed team of the 2014–15 A Group, would have qualified for the Europa League first qualifying round, but failed to obtain a UEFA licence. As a result, the berth was given to Litex Lovech, the fourth-placed team of the league. An appeal was denied on 1 June 2015.
2. Italy (ITA): Genoa, the sixth-placed team of the 2014–15 Serie A, would have qualified for the Europa League third qualifying round, but failed to obtain a UEFA licence. As a result, the berth was given to Sampdoria, the seventh-placed team of the league. Genoa withdrew their appeal on 3 June 2015.
3. Latvia (LVA): Liepāja, the fourth-placed team of the 2014 Latvian Higher League, would have qualified for the Europa League first qualifying round, but failed to obtain a UEFA licence as they were affiliated with the Latvian Football Federation for less than three years after reforming from the dissolved Liepājas Metalurgs. As a result, the berth was given to Spartaks Jūrmala, the sixth-placed team of the league, as Daugava Daugavpils, the fifth-placed team, also failed to obtain a UEFA licence.
4. Moldova (MDA): Tiraspol, the fourth-placed team of the 2014–15 Moldovan National Division, would have qualified for the Europa League first qualifying round, but were dissolved at the end of the 2014–15 season. As a result, the berth was given to Saxan, the fifth-placed team of the league.
5. Romania (ROU): CFR Cluj, the third-placed team of the 2014–15 Liga I, would have qualified for the Europa League second qualifying round, but were banned by UEFA after failing to settle overdue payables. As a result, Astra Giurgiu, the fourth-placed team of the league, entered the second qualifying round instead of the first qualifying round, while the first qualifying round berth was given to Botoșani, the eighth-placed team of the league, as Petrolul Ploiești, Universitatea Craiova and Dinamo București, the fifth-, sixth- and seventh-placed teams of the league respectively, all failed to obtain UEFA licences.
6. Russia (RUS): Dynamo Moscow, the fourth-placed team of the 2014–15 Russian Premier League, would have qualified for the Europa League third qualifying round, but they were referred to the UEFA's Club Financial Control Body adjudicatory chamber on 24 April 2015 for violating the Financial Fair Play break-even requirements after the club was not able to reach the settlement with UEFA. The meeting regarding the sanctions for the violation was held on 16 June 2015, and on 19 June 2015, it was announced that Dynamo Moscow were excluded from the UEFA Europa League for the 2015–16 season. As a result, the berth was given to Rubin Kazan, the fifth-placed team of the league.

== Round and draw dates ==
The schedule of the competition was as follows (all draws were held at UEFA headquarters in Nyon, Switzerland, unless stated otherwise).

Phase	Round	Draw date	First leg	Second leg
Qualifying	First qualifying round	22 June 2015	2 July 2015	9 July 2015
Qualifying	Second qualifying round	22 June 2015	16 July 2015	23 July 2015
Qualifying	Third qualifying round	17 July 2015	30 July 2015	6 August 2015
Play-off	Play-off round	7 August 2015	20 August 2015	27 August 2015
Group stage	Matchday 1	28 August 2015 (Monaco)	17 September 2015	
Group stage	Matchday 2	28 August 2015 (Monaco)	1 October 2015	
Group stage	Matchday 3	28 August 2015 (Monaco)	22 October 2015	
Group stage	Matchday 4	28 August 2015 (Monaco)	5 November 2015	
Group stage	Matchday 5	28 August 2015 (Monaco)	26 November 2015	
Group stage	Matchday 6	28 August 2015 (Monaco)	10 December 2015	
Knockout phase	Round of 32	14 December 2015	18 February 2016	25 February 2016
Knockout phase	Round of 16	26 February 2016	10 March 2016	17 March 2016
Knockout phase	Quarter-finals	18 March 2016	7 April 2016	14 April 2016
Knockout phase	Semi-finals	15 April 2016	28 April 2016	5 May 2016
Knockout phase	Final	15 April 2016	18 May 2016 at St. Jakob-Park, Basel	

Matches in the qualifying, play-off, and knockout rounds could also be played on Tuesdays or Wednesdays instead of the regular Thursdays due to scheduling conflicts.

== Qualifying rounds ==
In the qualifying rounds and the play-off round, teams are divided into seeded and unseeded teams based on their 2015 UEFA club coefficients, and then drawn into two-legged home-and-away ties. Teams from the same association cannot be drawn against each other.

=== First qualifying round ===
The draw for the first and second qualifying round was held on 22 June 2015. With 102 teams involved, it was UEFA's biggest ever tournament draw. The first legs were played on 30 June and 2 July, and the second legs were played on 7 and 9 July 2015.

Team 1	Agg.	Team 2	1st leg	2nd leg
Víkingur Reykjavík (Iceland)	2–3	(Slovenia) Koper	0–1	2–2
Sheriff Tiraspol (Moldova)	0–3	(Norway) Odd	0–3	0–0
Kukësi (Albania)	2–0	(Belarus) Torpedo-BelAZ Zhodino	2–0	0–0
Alashkert (Armenia)	2–2 (a)	(Scotland) St Johnstone	1–0	1–2
Jelgava (Latvia)	3–3 (a)	(Bulgaria) Litex Lovech	1–1	2–2
Newtown (Wales)	4–2	(Malta) Valletta	2–1	2–1
Dinamo Tbilisi (Georgia (country))	2–3	(Azerbaijan) Gabala	2–1	0–2
Renova (North Macedonia)	1–5	(Moldova) Dacia Chișinău	0–1	1–4
Olimpic (Bosnia and Herzegovina)	1–1 (a)	(Slovakia) Spartak Trnava	1–1	0–0
West Ham United (England)	4–0 (Note: Order of legs reversed after original draw.)	(Andorra) Lusitanos	3–0	1–0
Glenavon (Northern Ireland)	1–5	(Belarus) Shakhtyor Soligorsk	1–2	0–3
Differdange 03 (Luxembourg)	4–3	(Wales) Bala Town	3–1	1–2
Shkëndija (North Macedonia)	1–1 (a)	(Scotland) Aberdeen	1–1	0–0
Víkingur Gøta (Faroe Islands)	0–2	(Norway) Rosenborg	0–2	0–0
SJK (Finland)	0–2	(Iceland) FH	0–1	0–1
Linfield (Northern Ireland)	5–4	(Faroe Islands) NSÍ	2–0	3–4
Brøndby (Denmark)	11–0	(San Marino) Juvenes/Dogana	9–0	2–0
MTK Budapest (Hungary)	1–3	(Serbia) Vojvodina	0–0	1–3
Skonto (Latvia)	4–1	(Republic of Ireland) St Patrick's Athletic	2–1	2–0
Lahti (Finland)	2–7	(Sweden) IF Elfsborg	2–2	0–5
Atlantas (Lithuania)	1–5	(Bulgaria) Beroe Stara Zagora	0–2	1–3
Debrecen (Hungary)	3–2	(Montenegro) Sutjeska	3–0	0–2
Ordabasy (Kazakhstan)	1–2	(Israel) Beitar Jerusalem	0–0	1–2
Balzan (Malta)	0–3	(Bosnia and Herzegovina) Željezničar	0–2	0–1
Sillamäe Kalev (Estonia)	3–7	(Croatia) Hajduk Split	1–1	2–6
Budućnost Podgorica (Montenegro)	1–3	(Latvia) Spartaks Jūrmala	1–3	0–0
Red Star Belgrade (Serbia)	1–4	(Kazakhstan) Kairat	0–2	1–2
Flora (Estonia)	1–2	(North Macedonia) Rabotnicki	1–0	0–2
Sant Julià (Andorra)	0–4	(Denmark) Randers	0–1	0–3
Saxan (Moldova)	0–4	(Cyprus) Apollon Limassol	0–2	0–2
Progrès Niederkorn (Luxembourg)	0–3	(Republic of Ireland) Shamrock Rovers	0–0	0–3
Aktobe (Kazakhstan)	0–1	(Estonia) Nõmme Kalju	0–1	0–0
Dinamo Batumi (Georgia (country))	1–2	(Cyprus) Omonia	1–0	0–2
Kruoja Pakruojis (Lithuania)	0–9	(Poland) Jagiellonia Białystok	0–1	0–8
Shirak (Armenia)	3–2	(Bosnia and Herzegovina) Zrinjski Mostar	2–0	1–2
Cork City (Republic of Ireland)	2–3	(Iceland) KR	1–1	1–2 (a.e.t.)
Go Ahead Eagles (Netherlands)	2–5	(Hungary) Ferencváros	1–1	1–4
Trakai (Lithuania)	7–1	(Faroe Islands) HB	3–0	4–1
Laçi (Albania)	1–1 (a)	(Azerbaijan) Inter Baku	1–1	0–0
VPS (Finland)	2–6	(Sweden) AIK	2–2	0–4
UCD (Republic of Ireland)	2–2 (a)	(Luxembourg) F91 Dudelange	1–0	1–2
Domžale (Slovenia)	0–1	(Serbia) Čukarički	0–1	0–0
Glentoran (Northern Ireland)	1–7	(Slovakia) Žilina	1–4	0–3
Strømsgodset (Norway)	4–1	(Albania) Partizani	3–1	1–0
Neftçi (Azerbaijan)	3–3 (a)	(Montenegro) Mladost Podgorica	2–2	1–1
Celje (Slovenia)	1–4	(Poland) Śląsk Wrocław	0–1	1–3
La Fiorita (San Marino)	1–10	(Liechtenstein) Vaduz	0–5	1–5
Birkirkara (Malta)	3–1	(Armenia) Ulisses	0–0	3–1
Airbus UK Broughton (Wales)	3–5	(Croatia) Lokomotiva Zagreb	1–3	2–2
Botoșani (Romania)	4–2	(Georgia (country)) Tskhinvali	1–1	3–1
Europa (Gibraltar)	0–9	(Slovakia) Slovan Bratislava	0–6	0–3

=== Second qualifying round ===
The first legs were played on 16 July, and the second legs were played on 21 and 23 July 2015.

Team 1	Agg.	Team 2	1st leg	2nd leg
Kukësi (Albania)	4–3	(Montenegro) Mladost Podgorica	0–1	4–2
Lokomotiva Zagreb (Croatia)	2–7	(Greece) PAOK	2–1	0–6
Slovan Bratislava (Slovakia)	6–1	(Republic of Ireland) UCD	1–0	5–1
Ferencváros (Hungary)	0–3	(Bosnia and Herzegovina) Željezničar	0–1	0–2
Vaduz (Liechtenstein)	5–1	(Estonia) Nõmme Kalju	3–1	2–0
Beroe Stara Zagora (Bulgaria)	0–1	(Denmark) Brøndby	0–1	0–0
KR (Iceland)	0–4	(Norway) Rosenborg	0–1	0–3
AIK (Sweden)	4–0	(Armenia) Shirak	2–0	2–0
Legia Warsaw (Poland)	4–0	(Romania) Botoșani	1–0	3–0
Dacia Chișinău (Moldova)	3–6	(Slovakia) Žilina	1–2	2–4
Shamrock Rovers (Republic of Ireland)	1–4	(Norway) Odd	0–2	1–2
Hapoel Be'er Sheva (Israel)	2–3	(Switzerland) Thun	1–1	1–2
Kairat (Kazakhstan)	4–2	(Armenia) Alashkert	3–0	1–2
Vojvodina (Serbia)	4–1	(Latvia) Spartaks Jūrmala	3–0	1–1
Jagiellonia Białystok (Poland)	0–1	(Cyprus) Omonia	0–0	0–1
Jelgava (Latvia)	1–2	(North Macedonia) Rabotnicki	1–0	0–2
Čukarički (Serbia)	1–2	(Azerbaijan) Gabala	1–0	0–2
Shakhtyor Soligorsk (Belarus)	0–3	(Austria) Wolfsberger AC	0–1	0–2
Trabzonspor (Turkey)	3–1	(Luxembourg) Differdange 03	1–0	2–1
Charleroi (Belgium)	9–2	(Israel) Beitar Jerusalem	5–1	4–1
Randers (Denmark)	0–1	(Sweden) IF Elfsborg	0–0	0–1 (a.e.t.)
Mladá Boleslav (Czech Republic)	2–2 (a)	(Norway) Strømsgodset	1–2	1–0
Cherno More (Bulgaria)	1–5	(Belarus) Dinamo Minsk	1–1	0–4
Rijeka (Croatia)	2–5	(Scotland) Aberdeen	0–3	2–2
West Ham United (England)	1–1 (5–3 p)	(Malta) Birkirkara	1–0	0–1 (a.e.t.)
Apollon Limassol (Cyprus)	4–0	(Lithuania) Trakai	4–0	0–0
Koper (Slovenia)	4–6	(Croatia) Hajduk Split	3–2	1–4
FH (Iceland)	3–4	(Azerbaijan) Inter Baku	1–2	2–2 (a.e.t.)
Inverness CT (Scotland)	0–1	(Romania) Astra Giurgiu	0–1	0–0
Spartak Trnava (Slovakia)	5–2	(Northern Ireland) Linfield	2–1	3–1
Copenhagen (Denmark)	5–1	(Wales) Newtown	2–0	3–1
Śląsk Wrocław (Poland)	0–2	(Sweden) IFK Göteborg	0–0	0–2
Skonto (Latvia)	4–11	(Hungary) Debrecen	2–2	2–9

=== Third qualifying round ===
The draw for the third qualifying round was held on 17 July 2015. The first legs were played on 29 and 30 July, and the second legs were played on 6 August 2015.

Team 1	Agg.	Team 2	1st leg	2nd leg
Zürich (Switzerland)	1–2	(Belarus) Dinamo Minsk	0–1	1–1 (a.e.t.)
Kairat (Kazakhstan)	3–2	(Scotland) Aberdeen	2–1	1–1
Žilina (Slovakia)	3–3 (a)	(Ukraine) Vorskla Poltava	2–0	1–3 (a.e.t.)
AZ (Netherlands)	4–1	(Turkey) İstanbul Başakşehir	2–0	2–1
Bordeaux (France)	4–0	(Cyprus) AEK Larnaca	3–0	1–0
PAOK (Greece)	2–1	(Slovakia) Spartak Trnava	1–0	1–1
Târgu Mureș (Romania)	2–4	(France) Saint-Étienne	0–3	2–1
Debrecen (Hungary)	3–6	(Norway) Rosenborg	2–3	1–3
Jablonec (Czech Republic)	3–3 (a)	(Denmark) Copenhagen	0–1	3–2
Thun (Switzerland)	2–2 (a)	(Liechtenstein) Vaduz	0–0	2–2
Belenenses (Portugal)	2–1	(Sweden) IFK Göteborg	2–1	0–0
Sampdoria (Italy)	2–4	(Serbia) Vojvodina	0–4	2–0
Kukësi (Albania)	0–4	(Poland) Legia Warsaw	0–3 (Note: Legia Warsaw won 3–0 by default after their first leg match against Kukësi was abandoned when a Legia player was hit by an object from the crowd.)	0–1
Charleroi (Belgium)	0–5	(Ukraine) Zorya Luhansk	0–2	0–3
Sturm Graz (Austria)	3–4	(Russia) Rubin Kazan	2–3	1–1
IF Elfsborg (Sweden)	2–3	(Norway) Odd	2–1	0–2
Southampton (England)	5–0	(Netherlands) Vitesse	3–0	2–0
Slovan Liberec (Czech Republic)	5–1	(Israel) Ironi Kiryat Shmona	2–1	3–0
Apollon Limassol (Cyprus)	1–2 (Note: Order of legs reversed after original draw.)	(Azerbaijan) Gabala	1–1	0–1
Wolfsberger AC (Austria)	0–6	(Germany) Borussia Dortmund	0–1	0–5
AIK (Sweden)	1–4	(Greece) Atromitos	1–3	0–1
Standard Liège (Belgium)	3–1	(Bosnia and Herzegovina) Željezničar	2–1	1–0
West Ham United (England)	3–4	(Romania) Astra Giurgiu	2–2	1–2
Athletic Bilbao (Spain)	2–0	(Azerbaijan) Inter Baku	2–0	0–0
Rabotnicki (North Macedonia)	2–1	(Turkey) Trabzonspor	1–0	1–1 (a.e.t.)
Brøndby (Denmark)	2–2 (a)	(Cyprus) Omonia	0–0	2–2
Rheindorf Altach (Austria)	6–2	(Portugal) Vitória de Guimarães	2–1	4–1
Hajduk Split (Croatia)	4–0	(Norway) Strømsgodset	2–0	2–0
Krasnodar (Russia)	5–3	(Slovakia) Slovan Bratislava	2–0	3–3

== Play-off round ==
The draw for the play-off round was held on 7 August 2015. The first legs were played on 20 August, and the second legs were played on 27 August 2015.

Team 1	Agg.	Team 2	1st leg	2nd leg
Rheindorf Altach (Austria)	0–1	(Portugal) Belenenses	0–1	0–0
Žilina (Slovakia)	3–3 (a)	(Spain) Athletic Bilbao	3–2	0–1
Steaua București (Romania)	1–3	(Norway) Rosenborg	0–3	1–0
Zorya Luhansk (Ukraine)	2–4	(Poland) Legia Warsaw	0–1	2–3
Viktoria Plzeň (Czech Republic)	5–0	(Serbia) Vojvodina	3–0	2–0
Milsami Orhei (Moldova)	1–2	(France) Saint-Étienne	1–1	0–1
Ajax (Netherlands)	1–0 (Note: Order of legs reversed after original draw.)	(Czech Republic) Jablonec	1–0	0–0
Young Boys (Switzerland)	0–4	(Azerbaijan) Qarabağ	0–1	0–3
Molde (Norway)	3–3 (a)	(Belgium) Standard Liège	2–0	1–3
PAOK (Greece)	6–1	(Denmark) Brøndby	5–0	1–1
Bordeaux (France)	2–2 (a)	(Kazakhstan) Kairat	1–0	1–2
Lech Poznań (Poland)	4–0	(Hungary) Videoton	3–0	1–0
Dinamo Minsk (Belarus)	2–2 (3–2 p)	(Austria) Red Bull Salzburg	2–0	0–2 (a.e.t.)
Rabotnicki (North Macedonia)	1–2	(Russia) Rubin Kazan	1–1	0–1
Slovan Liberec (Czech Republic)	2–0	(Croatia) Hajduk Split	1–0	1–0
Atromitos (Greece)	0–4	(Turkey) Fenerbahçe	0–1	0–3
Gabala (Azerbaijan)	2–2 (a)	(Greece) Panathinaikos	0–0	2–2
Southampton (England)	1–2	(Denmark) Midtjylland	1–1	0–1
Astra Giurgiu (Romania)	3–4	(Netherlands) AZ	3–2	0–2
Odd (Norway)	5–11	(Germany) Borussia Dortmund	3–4	2–7
Krasnodar (Russia)	5–1	(Finland) HJK	5–1	0–0
Sparta Prague (Czech Republic)	6–4	(Switzerland) Thun	3–1	3–3

== Group stage ==
Location of teams of the 2015–16 UEFA Europa League group stage.
Red: Group A; Yellow: Group B; Green: Group C; Dark Green: Group D;
Purple: Group E; Pink: Group F; Blue: Group G; Orange: Group H;
Brown: Group I; Deep pink: Group J; Cyan: Group K; Spring green: Group L.

The draw for the group stage was held in Monaco on 28 August 2015. The 48 teams were drawn into twelve groups of four, with the restriction that teams from the same association could not be drawn against each other. For the draw, the teams were seeded into four pots based on their 2015 UEFA club coefficients.

In each group, teams played against each other home-and-away in a round-robin format. The group winners and runners-up advanced to the round of 32, where they were joined by the eight third-placed teams of the 2015–16 UEFA Champions League group stage. The matchdays were 17 September, 1 October, 22 October, 5 November, 26 November, and 10 December 2015.

A total of 24 national associations were represented in the group stage. FC Augsburg, Belenenses, Gabala, Groningen, Midtjylland, Monaco, Sion and Skënderbeu made their debut appearances in the group stage (although Monaco have appeared in the UEFA Cup group stage). Skënderbeu Korçë were the first team from Albania to play in the group stage of any UEFA club competition.

Tiebreakers
The teams are ranked according to points (3 points for a win, 1 point for a draw, 0 points for a loss). If two or more teams are equal on points on completion of the group matches, the following criteria are applied in the order given to determine the rankings (regulations Article 16.01):
1. higher number of points obtained in the group matches played among the teams in question;
2. superior goal difference from the group matches played among the teams in question;
3. higher number of goals scored in the group matches played among the teams in question;
4. higher number of goals scored away from home in the group matches played among the teams in question;
5. if, after having applied criteria 1 to 4, teams still have an equal ranking, criteria 1 to 4 are reapplied exclusively to the matches between the teams in question to determine their final rankings. If this procedure does not lead to a decision, criteria 6 to 12 apply;
6. superior goal difference in all group matches;
7. higher number of goals scored in all group matches;
8. higher number of away goals scored in all group matches;
9. higher number of wins in all group matches;
10. higher number of away wins in all group matches;
11. lower disciplinary points total based only on yellow and red cards received in all group matches (red card = 3 points, yellow card = 1 point, expulsion for two yellow cards in one match = 3 points);
12. higher club coefficient.

=== Group A ===
Pos	Team	Pld	W	D	L	GF	GA	GD	Pts	Qualification	MOL	FEN	AJX	CEL
1	(Norway) Molde	6	3	2	1	10	7	+3	11	Advance to knockout phase	—	0–2	1–1	3–1
2	(Turkey) Fenerbahçe	6	2	3	1	7	6	+1	9	Advance to knockout phase	1–3	—	1–0	1–1
3	(Netherlands) Ajax	6	1	4	1	6	6	0	7		1–1	0–0	—	2–2
4	(Scotland) Celtic	6	0	3	3	8	12	−4	3		1–2	2–2	1–2	—

Source: Soccerway

=== Group B ===
Pos	Team	Pld	W	D	L	GF	GA	GD	Pts	Qualification	LIV	SIO	RUB	BOR
1	(England) Liverpool	6	2	4	0	6	4	+2	10	Advance to knockout phase	—	1–1	1–1	2–1
2	(Switzerland) Sion	6	2	3	1	5	5	0	9	Advance to knockout phase	0–0	—	2–1	1–1
3	(Russia) Rubin Kazan	6	1	3	2	6	6	0	6		0–1	2–0	—	0–0
4	(France) Bordeaux	6	0	4	2	5	7	−2	4		1–1	0–1	2–2	—

Source: Soccerway

=== Group C ===
Pos	Team	Pld	W	D	L	GF	GA	GD	Pts	Qualification	KRA	DOR	PAOK	QAB
1	(Russia) Krasnodar	6	4	1	1	9	4	+5	13	Advance to knockout phase	—	1–0	2–1	2–1
2	(Germany) Borussia Dortmund	6	3	1	2	10	5	+5	10	Advance to knockout phase	2–1	—	0–1	4–0
3	(Greece) PAOK	6	1	4	1	3	3	0	7		0–0	1–1	—	0–0
4	(Azerbaijan) Gabala	6	0	2	4	2	12	−10	2		0–3	1–3	0–0	—

Source: Soccerway

=== Group D ===
Pos	Team	Pld	W	D	L	GF	GA	GD	Pts	Qualification	NAP	MID	BRU	LEG
1	(Italy) Napoli	6	6	0	0	22	3	+19	18	Advance to knockout phase	—	5–0	5–0	5–2
2	(Denmark) Midtjylland	6	2	1	3	6	12	−6	7	Advance to knockout phase	1–4	—	1–1	1–0
3	(Belgium) Club Brugge	6	1	2	3	4	11	−7	5		0–1	1–3	—	1–0
4	(Poland) Legia Warsaw	6	1	1	4	4	10	−6	4		0–2	1–0	1–1	—

Source: Soccerway

=== Group E ===
Pos	Team	Pld	W	D	L	GF	GA	GD	Pts	Qualification	RW	VIL	PLZ	DMI
1	(Austria) Rapid Wien	6	5	0	1	10	6	+4	15	Advance to knockout phase	—	2–1	3–2	2–1
2	(Spain) Villarreal	6	4	1	1	12	6	+6	13	Advance to knockout phase	1–0	—	1–0	4–0
3	(Czech Republic) Viktoria Plzeň	6	1	1	4	8	10	−2	4		1–2	3–3	—	2–0
4	(Belarus) Dinamo Minsk	6	1	0	5	3	11	−8	3		0–1	1–2	1–0	—

Source: Soccerway

=== Group F ===
Pos	Team	Pld	W	D	L	GF	GA	GD	Pts	Qualification	BRA	MAR	LIB	GRO
1	(Portugal) Braga	6	4	1	1	7	4	+3	13	Advance to knockout phase	—	3–2	2–1	1–0
2	(France) Marseille	6	4	0	2	12	7	+5	12	Advance to knockout phase	1–0	—	0–1	2–1
3	(Czech Republic) Slovan Liberec	6	2	1	3	6	8	−2	7		0–1	2–4	—	1–1
4	(Netherlands) Groningen	6	0	2	4	2	8	−6	2		0–0	0–3	0–1	—

Source: Soccerway

=== Group G ===
Pos	Team	Pld	W	D	L	GF	GA	GD	Pts	Qualification	LAZ	SET	DNI	ROS
1	(Italy) Lazio	6	4	2	0	13	6	+7	14	Advance to knockout phase	—	3–2	3–1	3–1
2	(France) Saint-Étienne	6	2	3	1	10	7	+3	9	Advance to knockout phase	1–1	—	3–0	2–2
3	(Ukraine) Dnipro Dnipropetrovsk	6	2	1	3	6	8	−2	7		1–1	0–1	—	3–0
4	(Norway) Rosenborg	6	0	2	4	4	12	−8	2		0–2	1–1	0–1	—

Source: Soccerway

=== Group H ===
Pos	Team	Pld	W	D	L	GF	GA	GD	Pts	Qualification	LMO	SPO	BES	SKE
1	(Russia) Lokomotiv Moscow	6	3	2	1	12	7	+5	11	Advance to knockout phase	—	2–4	1–1	2–0
2	(Portugal) Sporting CP	6	3	1	2	14	11	+3	10	Advance to knockout phase	1–3	—	3–1	5–1
3	(Turkey) Beşiktaş	6	2	3	1	7	6	+1	9		1–1	1–1	—	2–0
4	(Albania) Skënderbeu	6	1	0	5	4	13	−9	3		0–3	3–0	0–1	—

Source: Soccerway

=== Group I ===
Pos	Team	Pld	W	D	L	GF	GA	GD	Pts	Qualification	BSL	FIO	LCH	BEL
1	(Switzerland) Basel	6	4	1	1	10	5	+5	13	Advance to knockout phase	—	2–2	2–0	1–2
2	(Italy) Fiorentina	6	3	1	2	11	6	+5	10	Advance to knockout phase	1–2	—	1–2	1–0
3	(Poland) Lech Poznań	6	1	2	3	2	6	−4	5		0–1	0–2	—	0–0
4	(Portugal) Belenenses	6	1	2	3	2	8	−6	5		0–2	0–4	0–0	—

Source: Soccerway

=== Group J ===
Pos	Team	Pld	W	D	L	GF	GA	GD	Pts	Qualification	TOT	AND	MON	QAR
1	(England) Tottenham Hotspur	6	4	1	1	12	6	+6	13	Advance to knockout phase	—	2–1	4–1	3–1
2	(Belgium) Anderlecht	6	3	1	2	8	6	+2	10	Advance to knockout phase	2–1	—	1–1	2–1
3	(France) Monaco	6	1	3	2	5	9	−4	6		1–1	0–2	—	1–0
4	(Azerbaijan) Qarabağ	6	1	1	4	4	8	−4	4		0–1	1–0	1–1	—

Source: Soccerway

=== Group K ===
Pos	Team	Pld	W	D	L	GF	GA	GD	Pts	Qualification	SCH	SPP	AT	APO
1	(Germany) Schalke 04	6	4	2	0	15	3	+12	14	Advance to knockout phase	—	2–2	4–0	1–0
2	(Czech Republic) Sparta Prague	6	3	3	0	10	5	+5	12	Advance to knockout phase	1–1	—	1–0	2–0
3	(Greece) Asteras Tripolis	6	1	1	4	4	12	−8	4		0–4	1–1	—	2–0
4	(Cyprus) APOEL	6	1	0	5	3	12	−9	3		0–3	1–3	2–1	—

Source: Soccerway

=== Group L ===
Pos	Team	Pld	W	D	L	GF	GA	GD	Pts	Qualification	ATH	AUG	PAR	AZ
1	(Spain) Athletic Bilbao	6	4	1	1	16	8	+8	13	Advance to knockout phase	—	3–1	5–1	2–2
2	(Germany) FC Augsburg	6	3	0	3	12	11	+1	9	Advance to knockout phase	2–3	—	1–3	4–1
3	(Serbia) Partizan	6	3	0	3	10	14	−4	9		0–2	1–3	—	3–2
4	(Netherlands) AZ	6	1	1	4	8	13	−5	4		2–1	0–1	1–2	—

Source: Soccerway

== Knockout phase ==
In the knockout phase, teams played against each other over two legs on a home-and-away basis, except for the one-match final. The mechanism of the draws for each round was as follows:

- In the draw for the round of 32, the twelve group winners and the four third-placed teams from the Champions League group stage with the better group records were seeded, and the twelve group runners-up and the other four third-placed teams from the Champions League group stage were unseeded. The seeded teams were drawn against the unseeded teams, with the seeded teams hosting the second leg. Teams from the same group or the same association could not be drawn against each other.
- In the draws for the round of 16 onwards, there were no seedings, and teams from the same group or the same association could be drawn against each other.

=== Bracket ===
Round of 32
(Spain) Villarreal	1	1	2
(Italy) Napoli	0	1	1
(Portugal) Sporting CP	0	1	1
(Germany) Bayer Leverkusen	1	3	4
(Czech Republic) Sparta Prague	1	3	4
(Russia) Krasnodar	0	0	0
(Turkey) Galatasaray	1	1	2
(Italy) Lazio	1	3	4
(Germany) Borussia Dortmund	2	1	3
(Portugal) Porto	0	0	0
(Italy) Fiorentina	1	0	1
(England) Tottenham Hotspur	1	3	4
(Germany) FC Augsburg	0	0	0
(England) Liverpool	0	1	1
(Denmark) Midtjylland	2	1	3
(England) Manchester United	1	5	6
(Turkey) Fenerbahçe	2	1	3
(Russia) Lokomotiv Moscow	0	1	1
(Switzerland) Sion	1	2	3
(Portugal) Braga	2	2	4
(Ukraine) Shakhtar Donetsk	0	3	3
(Germany) Schalke 04	0	0	0
(Belgium) Anderlecht (a.e.t.)	1	2	3
(Greece) Olympiacos	0	1	1
(France) Marseille	0	1	1
(Spain) Athletic Bilbao	1	1	2
(Spain) Valencia	6	4	10
(Austria) Rapid Wien	0	0	0
(France) Saint-Étienne	3	1	4
(Switzerland) Basel (a)	2	2	4
(Spain) Sevilla	3	0	3
(Norway) Molde	0	1	1

Round of 16
(Spain) Villarreal	2	0	2
(Germany) Bayer Leverkusen	0	0	0
(Czech Republic) Sparta Prague	1	3	4
(Italy) Lazio	1	0	1
(Germany) Borussia Dortmund	3	2	5
(England) Tottenham Hotspur	0	1	1
(England) Liverpool	2	1	3
(England) Manchester United	0	1	1
(Turkey) Fenerbahçe	1	1	2
(Portugal) Braga	0	4	4
(Ukraine) Shakhtar Donetsk	3	1	4
(Belgium) Anderlecht	1	0	1
(Spain) Athletic Bilbao (a)	1	1	2
(Spain) Valencia	0	2	2
(Switzerland) Basel	0	0	0
(Spain) Sevilla	0	3	3

Quarter-finals
(Spain) Villarreal	2	4	6
(Czech Republic) Sparta Prague	1	2	3
(Germany) Borussia Dortmund	1	3	4
(England) Liverpool	1	4	5
(Portugal) Braga	1	0	1
(Ukraine) Shakhtar Donetsk	2	4	6
(Spain) Athletic Bilbao	1	2	3 (4)
(Spain) Sevilla (p)	2	1	3 (5)

Semi-finals
(Spain) Villarreal	1	0	1
(England) Liverpool	0	3	3
(Ukraine) Shakhtar Donetsk	2	1	3
(Spain) Sevilla	2	3	5

Final
18 May – Basel
(England) Liverpool	1
(Spain) Sevilla	3

=== Round of 32 ===
The draw for the round of 32 was held on 14 December 2015. The first legs were played on 16 and 18 February, and the second legs were played on 24 and 25 February 2016.

Team 1	Agg.	Team 2	1st leg	2nd leg
Valencia (Spain)	10–0	(Austria) Rapid Wien	6–0	4–0
Fiorentina (Italy)	1–4	(England) Tottenham Hotspur	1–1	0–3
Borussia Dortmund (Germany)	3–0	(Portugal) Porto	2–0	1–0
Fenerbahçe (Turkey)	3–1	(Russia) Lokomotiv Moscow	2–0	1–1
Anderlecht (Belgium)	3–1	(Greece) Olympiacos	1–0	2–1 (a.e.t.)
Midtjylland (Denmark)	3–6	(England) Manchester United	2–1	1–5
FC Augsburg (Germany)	0–1	(England) Liverpool	0–0	0–1
Sparta Prague (Czech Republic)	4–0	(Russia) Krasnodar	1–0	3–0
Galatasaray (Turkey)	2–4	(Italy) Lazio	1–1	1–3
Sion (Switzerland)	3–4	(Portugal) Braga	1–2	2–2
Shakhtar Donetsk (Ukraine)	3–0	(Germany) Schalke 04	0–0	3–0
Marseille (France)	1–2	(Spain) Athletic Bilbao	0–1	1–1
Sevilla (Spain)	3–1	(Norway) Molde	3–0	0–1
Sporting CP (Portugal)	1–4	(Germany) Bayer Leverkusen	0–1	1–3
Villarreal (Spain)	2–1	(Italy) Napoli	1–0	1–1
Saint-Étienne (France)	4–4 (a)	(Switzerland) Basel	3–2	1–2

=== Round of 16 ===
The draw for the round of 16 was held on 26 February 2016. The first legs were played on 10 March, and the second legs were played on 17 March 2016.

Team 1	Agg.	Team 2	1st leg	2nd leg
Shakhtar Donetsk (Ukraine)	4–1	(Belgium) Anderlecht	3–1	1–0
Basel (Switzerland)	0–3	(Spain) Sevilla	0–0	0–3
Villarreal (Spain)	2–0	(Germany) Bayer Leverkusen	2–0	0–0
Athletic Bilbao (Spain)	2–2 (a)	(Spain) Valencia	1–0	1–2
Liverpool (England)	3–1	(England) Manchester United	2–0	1–1
Sparta Prague (Czech Republic)	4–1	(Italy) Lazio	1–1	3–0
Borussia Dortmund (Germany)	5–1	(England) Tottenham Hotspur	3–0	2–1
Fenerbahçe (Turkey)	2–4	(Portugal) Braga	1–0	1–4

=== Quarter-finals ===
The draw for the quarter-finals was held on 18 March 2016. The first legs were played on 7 April, and the second legs were played on 14 April 2016.

Team 1	Agg.	Team 2	1st leg	2nd leg
Braga (Portugal)	1–6	(Ukraine) Shakhtar Donetsk	1–2	0–4
Villarreal (Spain)	6–3	(Czech Republic) Sparta Prague	2–1	4–2
Athletic Bilbao (Spain)	3–3 (4–5 p)	(Spain) Sevilla	1–2	2–1 (a.e.t.)
Borussia Dortmund (Germany)	4–5	(England) Liverpool	1–1	3–4

=== Semi-finals ===
The draw for the semi-finals was held on 15 April 2016. The first legs were played on 28 April, and the second legs were played on 5 May 2016.

Team 1	Agg.	Team 2	1st leg	2nd leg
Shakhtar Donetsk (Ukraine)	3–5	(Spain) Sevilla	2–2	1–3
Villarreal (Spain)	1–3	(England) Liverpool	1–0	0–3

=== Final ===
The final was played on 18 May 2016 at the St. Jakob-Park in Basel, Switzerland. The "home" team (for administrative purposes) was determined by an additional draw held after the semi-final draw.

18 May 2016
20:45 UTC+2

Liverpool (England)	1–3	(Spain) Sevilla
Sturridge 35'	Report	Gameiro 46'; Coke 64', 70'

St. Jakob-Park, Basel
Attendance: 34,429
Referee: Jonas Eriksson (Sweden)

== Statistics ==
Statistics exclude qualifying rounds and play-off round.

=== Top goalscorers ===
Rank	Player	Team	Goals	Minutes played
1	(Spain) Aritz Aduriz	(Spain) Athletic Bilbao	10	907
2	(Democratic Republic of the Congo) Cédric Bakambu	(Spain) Villarreal	9	942
3	(France) Kevin Gameiro	(Spain) Sevilla	8	674
3	(Gabon) Pierre-Emerick Aubameyang	(Germany) Borussia Dortmund	8	772
5	(Paraguay) Raúl Bobadilla	(Germany) FC Augsburg	6	412
5	(Argentina) Erik Lamela	(England) Tottenham Hotspur	6	572
7	(Cameroon) Aboubakar Oumarou	(Serbia) Partizan	5	331
7	(Belgium) Dries Mertens	(Italy) Napoli	5	417
7	(Spain) José Callejón	(Italy) Napoli	5	448
7	(Argentina) Franco Di Santo	(Germany) Schalke 04	5	451
7	(Czech Republic) David Lafata	(Czech Republic) Sparta Prague	5	558
7	(Russia) Aleksandr Samedov	(Russia) Lokomotiv Moscow	5	720
7	(Germany) Marco Reus	(Germany) Borussia Dortmund	5	742

=== Top assists ===
Rank	Player	Team	Assists	Minutes played
1	(Spain) Denis Suárez	(Spain) Villarreal	6	966
2	(Czech Republic) Bořek Dočkal	(Czech Republic) Sparta Prague	5	1029
3	(South Korea) Son Heung-min	(England) Tottenham Hotspur	4	504
3	(France) Nolan Roux	(France) Saint-Étienne	4	538
3	(Spain) Vitolo	(Spain) Sevilla	4	634
3	(Spain) Beñat	(Spain) Athletic Bilbao	4	733
3	(Armenia) Henrikh Mkhitaryan	(Germany) Borussia Dortmund	4	902
3	(Portugal) Rafa Silva	(Portugal) Braga	4	1070
9	15 players		3	—N/a

=== Squad of the Season ===
The UEFA technical study group selected the following 18 players as the squad of the tournament.

Pos.	Name	Team
GK	(Spain) David Soria	(Spain) Sevilla
GK	(Spain) David de Gea	(England) Manchester United
DF	(Belgium) Toby Alderweireld	(England) Tottenham Hotspur
DF	(Germany) Mats Hummels	(Germany) Borussia Dortmund
DF	(France) Adil Rami	(Spain) Sevilla
DF	(Brazil) Mariano	(Spain) Sevilla
DF	(Croatia) Darijo Srna	(Ukraine) Shakhtar Donetsk
MF	(Germany) Emre Can	(England) Liverpool
MF	(Germany) Gonzalo Castro	(Germany) Borussia Dortmund
MF	(Brazil) Philippe Coutinho	(England) Liverpool
MF	(Argentina) Éver Banega	(Spain) Sevilla
MF	(Poland) Grzegorz Krychowiak	(Spain) Sevilla
MF	(France) Steven Nzonzi	(Spain) Sevilla
MF	(Brazil) Marlos	(Ukraine) Shakhtar Donetsk
FW	(Spain) Aritz Aduriz	(Spain) Athletic Bilbao
FW	(Gabon) Pierre-Emerick Aubameyang	(Germany) Borussia Dortmund
FW	(Democratic Republic of the Congo) Cédric Bakambu	(Spain) Villarreal
FW	(France) Kevin Gameiro	(Spain) Sevilla

== See also ==
- 2015–16 UEFA Champions League
- 2016 UEFA Super Cup
