= 2015–16 UEFA Europa League qualifying (third and play-off round matches) =

European football competition

This page summarises the matches of the third qualifying and play-off rounds of 2015–16 UEFA Europa League qualifying.

Times are CEST (UTC+2), as listed by UEFA (local times, if different, are in parentheses).

== Third qualifying round ==
=== Summary ===
The first legs were played on 29 and 30 July, and the second legs were played on 6 August 2015.

Team 1	Agg.	Team 2	1st leg	2nd leg
Zürich (Switzerland)	1–2	(Belarus) Dinamo Minsk	0–1	1–1 (a.e.t.)
Kairat (Kazakhstan)	3–2	(Scotland) Aberdeen	2–1	1–1
Žilina (Slovakia)	3–3 (a)	(Ukraine) Vorskla Poltava	2–0	1–3 (a.e.t.)
AZ (Netherlands)	4–1	(Turkey) İstanbul Başakşehir	2–0	2–1
Bordeaux (France)	4–0	(Cyprus) AEK Larnaca	3–0	1–0
PAOK (Greece)	2–1	(Slovakia) Spartak Trnava	1–0	1–1
Târgu Mureș (Romania)	2–4	(France) Saint-Étienne	0–3	2–1
Debrecen (Hungary)	3–6	(Norway) Rosenborg	2–3	1–3
Jablonec (Czech Republic)	3–3 (a)	(Denmark) Copenhagen	0–1	3–2
Thun (Switzerland)	2–2 (a)	(Liechtenstein) Vaduz	0–0	2–2
Belenenses (Portugal)	2–1	(Sweden) IFK Göteborg	2–1	0–0
Sampdoria (Italy)	2–4	(Serbia) Vojvodina	0–4	2–0
Kukësi (Albania)	0–4	(Poland) Legia Warsaw	0–3 (Note: Legia Warsaw won 3–0 by default after their first leg match against Kukësi was abandoned when a Legia player was hit by an object from the crowd.)	0–1
Charleroi (Belgium)	0–5	(Ukraine) Zorya Luhansk	0–2	0–3
Sturm Graz (Austria)	3–4	(Russia) Rubin Kazan	2–3	1–1
IF Elfsborg (Sweden)	2–3	(Norway) Odd	2–1	0–2
Southampton (England)	5–0	(Netherlands) Vitesse	3–0	2–0
Slovan Liberec (Czech Republic)	5–1	(Israel) Ironi Kiryat Shmona	2–1	3–0
Apollon Limassol (Cyprus)	1–2 (Note: Order of legs reversed after original draw.)	(Azerbaijan) Gabala	1–1	0–1
Wolfsberger AC (Austria)	0–6	(Germany) Borussia Dortmund	0–1	0–5
AIK (Sweden)	1–4	(Greece) Atromitos	1–3	0–1
Standard Liège (Belgium)	3–1	(Bosnia and Herzegovina) Željezničar	2–1	1–0
West Ham United (England)	3–4	(Romania) Astra Giurgiu	2–2	1–2
Athletic Bilbao (Spain)	2–0	(Azerbaijan) Inter Baku	2–0	0–0
Rabotnicki (North Macedonia)	2–1	(Turkey) Trabzonspor	1–0	1–1 (a.e.t.)
Brøndby (Denmark)	2–2 (a)	(Cyprus) Omonia	0–0	2–2
Rheindorf Altach (Austria)	6–2	(Portugal) Vitória de Guimarães	2–1	4–1
Hajduk Split (Croatia)	4–0	(Norway) Strømsgodset	2–0	2–0
Krasnodar (Russia)	5–3	(Slovakia) Slovan Bratislava	2–0	3–3

=== Matches ===
30 July 2015
19:30

Zürich (Switzerland)	0–1	(Belarus) Dinamo Minsk
	Report	Bećiraj 63' (pen.)

Letzigrund, Zürich
Attendance: 3,587
Referee: Tom Harald Hagen (Norway)
6 August 2015
19:15

Dinamo Minsk (Belarus)	1–1 (a.e.t.)	(Switzerland) Zürich
Bećiraj 118'	Report	Chermiti 4'

OSK Brestskiy, Brest (Note: Dinamo Minsk played their home matches at OSK Brestskiy, Brest, instead of their temporary stadium Traktor Stadium, Minsk.)
Attendance: 9,437
Referee: Marcin Borski (Poland)

Dinamo Minsk won 2–1 on aggregate.

30 July 2015
16:45

Kairat (Kazakhstan)	2–1	(Scotland) Aberdeen
Bakayev 13'; Islamkhan 22'	Report	McLean 69'

Central Stadium, Almaty
Attendance: 23,500
Referee: Tamás Bognár (Hungary)
6 August 2015
20:45

Aberdeen (Scotland)	1–1	(Kazakhstan) Kairat
McLean 84'	Report	Gohou 59'

Pittodrie Stadium, Aberdeen
Attendance: 20,317
Referee: Miroslav Zelinka (Czech Republic)

Kairat won 3–2 on aggregate.

30 July 2015
19:30

Žilina (Slovakia)	2–0	(Ukraine) Vorskla Poltava
Jelić 26'; Paur 73'	Report

Štadión pod Dubňom, Žilina
Attendance: 4,757
Referee: Marijo Strahonja (Croatia)
6 August 2015
19:00

Vorskla Poltava (Ukraine)	3–1 (a.e.t.)	(Slovakia) Žilina
Shynder 67'; Tkachuk 90+1'; Tursunov 101' (pen.)	Report	William 120+1'

Oleksiy Butovskyi Vorskla Stadium, Poltava
Attendance: 12,500
Referee: Aliyar Ağayev (Azerbaijan)

3–3 on aggregate; Žilina won on away goals.

30 July 2015
19:30

AZ (Netherlands)	2–0	(Turkey) İstanbul Başakşehir
Van der Linden 18' (pen.); Janssen 63'	Report

AFAS Stadion, Alkmaar
Attendance: 11,723
Referee: Kevin Clancy (Scotland)
6 August 2015
19:00

İstanbul Başakşehir (Turkey)	1–2	(Netherlands) AZ
Doka 45'	Report	Henriksen 21'; Van Overeem 75'

Başakşehir Fatih Terim Stadium, Istanbul
Attendance: 5,289
Referee: Carlos Clos Gómez (Spain)

AZ won 4–1 on aggregate.

30 July 2015
20:30

Bordeaux (France)	3–0	(Cyprus) AEK Larnaca
Poko 53'; Diabaté 74' (pen.); Maurice-Belay 80'	Report

Stade Matmut Atlantique, Bordeaux
Attendance: 30,174
Referee: Pavle Radovanović (Montenegro)
6 August 2015
19:30

AEK Larnaca (Cyprus)	0–1	(France) Bordeaux
	Report	Kiese Thelin 29'

Antonis Papadopoulos Stadium, Larnaca (Note: AEK Larnaca played their home match at Antonis Papadopoulos Stadium, Larnaca, instead of their regular stadium GSZ Stadium, Larnaca.)
Attendance: 2,500
Referee: Tobias Stieler (Germany)

Bordeaux won 4–0 on aggregate.

30 July 2015
19:00

PAOK (Greece)	1–0	(Slovakia) Spartak Trnava
Lucas 82'	Report

Toumba Stadium, Thessaloniki
Attendance: 12,427
Referee: Svein-Erik Edvartsen (Norway)
6 August 2015
20:05

Spartak Trnava (Slovakia)	1–1	(Greece) PAOK
Sabo 35' (pen.)	Report	Konstantinidis 48'

Štadión FC ViOn, Zlaté Moravce (Note: Spartak Trnava played their home matches at Štadión FC ViOn, Zlaté Moravce, instead of their regular stadium Štadión Antona Malatinského, Trnava, due to renovation.)
Attendance: 3,555
Referee: Tobias Welz (Germany)

PAOK won 2–1 on aggregate.

30 July 2015
20:00

Târgu Mureș (Romania)	0–3	(France) Saint-Étienne
	Report	Diomandé 24'; Hamouma 75', 83'

Stadionul Trans-Sil, Târgu Mureș
Attendance: 6,498
Referee: Pol van Boekel (Netherlands)
6 August 2015
20:00

Saint-Étienne (France)	1–2	(Romania) Târgu Mureș
González 72' (o.g.)	Report	Pedro 39'; González 62'

Stade Geoffroy-Guichard, Saint-Étienne
Attendance: 27,284
Referee: Craig Pawson (England)

Saint-Étienne won 4–2 on aggregate.

30 July 2015
20:00

Debrecen (Hungary)	2–3	(Norway) Rosenborg
Balogh 33'; Bódi 90'	Report	Mikkelsen 52', 87'; Helland 58'

Nagyerdei Stadion, Debrecen
Attendance: 10,532
Referee: Neil Doyle (Republic of Ireland)
6 August 2015
19:00

Rosenborg (Norway)	3–1	(Hungary) Debrecen
Søderlund 27'; Jensen 40'; Vilhjálmsson 86'	Report	Castillion 43'

Lerkendal Stadion, Trondheim
Attendance: 12,919
Referee: Clayton Pisani (Malta)

Rosenborg won 6–3 on aggregate.

29 July 2015
18:00

Jablonec (Czech Republic)	0–1	(Denmark) Copenhagen
	Report	Verbič 51'

Chance Arena, Jablonec nad Nisou
Attendance: 4,830
Referee: Mattias Gestranius (Finland)
6 August 2015
19:45

Copenhagen (Denmark)	2–3	(Czech Republic) Jablonec
N. Jørgensen 72'; Santander 88'	Report	Wágner 14'; Greguš 53'; Pospíšil 83'

Telia Parken, Copenhagen
Attendance: 14,142
Referee: Leontios Trattou (Cyprus)

3–3 on aggregate; Jablonec won on away goals.

30 July 2015
19:30

Thun (Switzerland)	0–0	(Liechtenstein) Vaduz
	Report

Stockhorn Arena, Thun
Attendance: 3,407
Referee: Jakob Kehlet (Denmark)
6 August 2015
19:30

Vaduz (Liechtenstein)	2–2	(Switzerland) Thun
Costanzo 32'; Neumayr 45+1'	Report	Rojas 38'; Buess 65'

Rheinpark Stadion, Vaduz
Attendance: 2,788
Referee: István Kovács (Romania)

2–2 on aggregate; Thun won on away goals.

30 July 2015
21:00

Belenenses (Portugal)	2–1	(Sweden) IFK Göteborg
Martins 23', 41'	Report	Aleesami 58'

Estádio do Restelo, Lisbon
Attendance: 5,671
Referee: Vlado Glođović (Serbia)
6 August 2015
19:00

IFK Göteborg (Sweden)	0–0	(Portugal) Belenenses
	Report

Gamla Ullevi, Gothenburg
Attendance: 12,976
Referee: Jonathan Lardot (Belgium)

Belenenses won 2–1 on aggregate.

30 July 2015
21:00

Sampdoria (Italy)	0–4	(Serbia) Vojvodina
	Report	Ivanić 4'; Stanisavljević 49'; Ožegović 58', 90+1'

Stadio Olimpico, Turin (Note: Sampdoria played their home match at Stadio Olimpico, Turin, instead of their regular stadium Stadio Luigi Ferraris, Genoa, due to works on the playing surface.)
Attendance: 4,200
Referee: Andreas Ekberg (Sweden)
6 August 2015
21:00

Vojvodina (Serbia)	0–2	(Italy) Sampdoria
	Report	Éder 15'; Muriel 70'

Karađorđe Stadium, Novi Sad
Attendance: 10,763
Referee: Paweł Raczkowski (Poland)

Vojvodina won 4–2 on aggregate.

30 July 2015
20:00

Kukësi (Albania)	0–3 Awarded (Note: The match was abandoned in the 52nd minute with a 2–1 lead for Legia Warsaw after a Legia Warsaw player was hit in the head by an object thrown from the crowd. On 4 August 2015, UEFA awarded Legia Warsaw with a 3–0 win against Kukësi Kukësi were given a €70,000 fine and ordered to play their next home match behind closed doors.)	(Poland) Legia Warsaw
Moreira 49'	Report	Nikolić 29'; Rzeźniczak 51'

Qemal Stafa National Stadium, Tirana (Note: Kukësi played their home matches at Qemal Stafa National Stadium, Tirana, instead of their regular stadium Zeqir Ymeri Stadium, Kukës.)
Attendance: 5,000
Referee: Stephan Klossner (Switzerland)
6 August 2015
21:00

Legia Warsaw (Poland)	1–0	(Albania) Kukësi
Kucharczyk 47'	Report

Polish Army Stadium, Warsaw
Attendance: 11,847
Referee: Tony Chapron (France)

Legia Warsaw won 4–0 on aggregate.

30 July 2015
20:30

Charleroi (Belgium)	0–2	(Ukraine) Zorya Luhansk
	Report	Malinovskyi 70', 89'

Stade du Pays de Charleroi, Charleroi
Attendance: 9,415
Referee: Radu Petrescu (Romania)
6 August 2015
20:00

Zorya Luhansk (Ukraine)	3–0	(Belgium) Charleroi
Ljubenović 58', 68' (pen.); Malinovskyi 90+3'	Report

Valeriy Lobanovskyi Dynamo Stadium, Kyiv (Note: Zorya Luhansk played their home match at Valeriy Lobanovskyi Dynamo Stadium, Kyiv, instead of their regular stadium Avanhard Stadium, Luhansk, due to the war conditions in Eastern Ukraine.)
Attendance: 4,000
Referee: Andris Treimanis (Latvia)

Zorya Luhansk won 5–0 on aggregate.

30 July 2015
19:00

Sturm Graz (Austria)	2–3	(Russia) Rubin Kazan
Avdijaj 21'; Piesinger 56'	Report	Kanunnikov 14'; Karadeniz 25' (pen.); Portnyagin 61'

UPC-Arena, Graz
Attendance: 9,765
Referee: Daniel Stefański (Poland)
6 August 2015
18:00

Rubin Kazan (Russia)	1–1	(Austria) Sturm Graz
Kuzmin 85'	Report	Tadić 68'

Central Stadium, Kazan (Note: Rubin Kazan played their home match at Central Stadium, Kazan, instead of their regular stadium Kazan Arena, Kazan, which was hosting the 2015 World Aquatics Championships.)
Attendance: 9,346
Referee: Liran Liany (Israel)

Rubin Kazan won 4–3 on aggregate.

30 July 2015
18:00

IF Elfsborg (Sweden)	2–1	(Norway) Odd
Prodell 43'; Lundevall 76'	Report	Occéan 21' (pen.)

Borås Arena, Borås
Attendance: 4,232
Referee: Ognjen Valjić (Bosnia and Herzegovina)
6 August 2015
19:00

Odd (Norway)	2–0	(Sweden) IF Elfsborg
Occéan 27'; Akabueze 71'	Report

Skagerak Arena, Skien
Attendance: 6,106
Referee: Sergei Ivanov (Russia)

Odd won 3–2 on aggregate.

30 July 2015
21:05

Southampton (England)	3–0	(Netherlands) Vitesse
Pellè 36'; Tadić 45+1' (pen.); Long 84'	Report

St Mary's Stadium, Southampton
Attendance: 30,050
Referee: Jesús Gil Manzano (Spain)
6 August 2015
20:00

Vitesse (Netherlands)	0–2	(England) Southampton
	Report	Pellè 4'; Mané 89'

GelreDome, Arnhem
Attendance: 20,550
Referee: Ilias Spathas (Greece)

Southampton won 5–0 on aggregate.

30 July 2015
19:00

Slovan Liberec (Czech Republic)	2–1	(Israel) Ironi Kiryat Shmona
Delarge 43'; Shala 84'	Report	Abed 89'

Stadion u Nisy, Liberec
Attendance: 5,400
Referee: Simon Lee Evans (Wales)
6 August 2015
19:00

Ironi Kiryat Shmona (Israel)	0–3	(Czech Republic) Slovan Liberec
	Report	Pavelka 33'; Šural 44'; Bakoš 52'

Netanya Stadium, Netanya (Note: Ironi Kiryat Shmona played their home match at Netanya Stadium, Netanya, instead of their regular stadium Municipal Stadium, Kiryat Shmona.)
Attendance: 1,200
Referee: Gediminas Mažeika (Lithuania)

Slovan Liberec won 5–1 on aggregate.

30 July 2015
19:00

Apollon Limassol (Cyprus)	1–1	(Azerbaijan) Gabala
Kolokoudias 14'	Report	Huseynov 90+5' (pen.)

Antonis Papadopoulos Stadium, Larnaca (Note: Apollon Limassol played their home matches at Antonis Papadopoulos Stadium, Larnaca, instead of their regular stadium Tsirion Stadium, Limassol.)
Attendance: 4,540
Referee: Serhiy Boyko (Ukraine)
6 August 2015
18:00

Gabala (Azerbaijan)	1–0	(Cyprus) Apollon Limassol
Huseynov 80' (pen.)	Report

Bakcell Arena, Baku (Note: Gabala played their home matches at Bakcell Arena, Baku, instead of their regular stadium City Stadium, Qabala, due to UEFA punishment.)
Attendance: 9,500
Referee: Duarte Gomes (Portugal)

Gabala won 2–1 on aggregate.

30 July 2015
21:05

Wolfsberger AC (Austria)	0–1	(Germany) Borussia Dortmund
	Report	Hofmann 16'

Wörthersee Stadion, Klagenfurt (Note: Wolfsberger AC played their home matches at Wörthersee Stadion, Klagenfurt, instead of their regular stadium Lavanttal-Arena, Wolfsberg.)
Attendance: 30,250
Referee: Davide Massa (Italy)
6 August 2015
20:30

Borussia Dortmund (Germany)	5–0	(Austria) Wolfsberger AC
Reus 48'; Aubameyang 64'; Mkhitaryan 73', 82', 86'	Report

Signal Iduna Park, Dortmund
Attendance: 65,190
Referee: Ionuț Avram (Romania)

Borussia Dortmund won 6–0 on aggregate.

30 July 2015
19:00

AIK (Sweden)	1–3	(Greece) Atromitos
Goitom 70' (pen.)	Report	Napoleoni 3'; Marcelinho 15'; Umbides 80' (pen.)

Friends Arena, Solna
Attendance: 9,771
Referee: Christian Dingert (Germany)
6 August 2015
20:00

Atromitos (Greece)	1–0	(Sweden) AIK
Marcelinho 67'	Report

Peristeri Stadium, Peristeri
Attendance: 2,587
Referee: Artyom Kuchin (Kazakhstan)

Atromitos won 4–1 on aggregate.

30 July 2015
20:30

Standard Liège (Belgium)	2–1	(Bosnia and Herzegovina) Željezničar
Kosorić 16' (o.g.); Knockaert 28'	Report	Đelmić 64'

Stade Maurice Dufrasne, Liège
Attendance: 11,608
Referee: Arnold Hunter (Northern Ireland)
6 August 2015
20:00

Željezničar (Bosnia and Herzegovina)	0–1	(Belgium) Standard Liège
	Report	Van Damme 68'

Asim Ferhatović Hase Stadium, Sarajevo (Note: Željezničar played their home matches at Asim Ferhatović Hase Stadium, Sarajevo, instead of their regular stadium Stadion Grbavica, Sarajevo.)
Attendance: 19,721
Referee: Georgi Kabakov (Bulgaria)

Standard Liège won 3–1 on aggregate.

30 July 2015
20:45

West Ham United (England)	2–2	(Romania) Astra Giurgiu
Valencia 23'; Zárate 51'	Report	Boldrin 71'; Ogbonna 82' (o.g.)

Boleyn Ground, London
Attendance: 33,858
Referee: Adrien Jaccottet (Switzerland)
6 August 2015
20:00

Astra Giurgiu (Romania)	2–1	(England) West Ham United
Budescu 32', 36'	Report	Lanzini 4'

Stadionul Marin Anastasovici, Giurgiu
Attendance: 6,300
Referee: Paolo Valeri (Italy)

Astra Giurgiu won 4–3 on aggregate.

30 July 2015
20:45

Athletic Bilbao (Spain)	2–0	(Azerbaijan) Inter Baku
Eraso 12', 49'	Report

San Mamés, Bilbao
Attendance: 32,823
Referee: Stavros Tritsonis (Greece)
6 August 2015
18:00

Inter Baku (Azerbaijan)	0–0	(Spain) Athletic Bilbao
	Report

Inter Arena, Baku
Attendance: 4,000
Referee: Serdar Gözübüyük (Netherlands)

Athletic Bilbao won 2–0 on aggregate.

30 July 2015
20:00

Rabotnicki (North Macedonia)	1–0	(Turkey) Trabzonspor
Ilijoski 23'	Report

Philip II Arena, Skopje
Attendance: 6,200
Referee: Paweł Gil (Poland)
6 August 2015
19:00

Trabzonspor (Turkey)	1–1 (a.e.t.)	(North Macedonia) Rabotnicki
Yokuşlu 55'	Report	Markoski 112'

Hüseyin Avni Aker Stadium, Trabzon
Attendance: 13,704
Referee: Steven McLean (Scotland)

Rabotnicki won 2–1 on aggregate.

30 July 2015
20:00

Brøndby (Denmark)	0–0	(Cyprus) Omonia
	Report

Brøndby Stadium, Brøndbyvester
Attendance: 7,427
Referee: Libor Kovařík (Czech Republic)
6 August 2015
18:00

Omonia (Cyprus)	2–2	(Denmark) Brøndby
Sheridan 16' (pen.), 45+3' (pen.)	Report	Pukki 2', 39'

GSP Stadium, Nicosia
Attendance: 17,943
Referee: Harald Lechner (Austria)

2–2 on aggregate; Brøndby won on away goals.

30 July 2015
19:00

Rheindorf Altach (Austria)	2–1	(Portugal) Vitória de Guimarães
Ngwat-Mahop 24'; Aigner 50' (pen.)	Report	Tozé 71'

Tivoli-Neu, Innsbruck (Note: Rheindorf Altach played their home match at Tivoli-Neu, Innsbruck, instead of their regular stadium Cashpoint-Arena, Altach.)
Attendance: 3,267
Referee: Aleksei Eskov (Russia)
6 August 2015
22:15

Vitória de Guimarães (Portugal)	1–4	(Austria) Rheindorf Altach
Tomané 67'	Report	Netzer 31'; Correia 59' (o.g.); Prokopič 63'; Lienhart 90+3'

Estádio D. Afonso Henriques, Guimarães
Attendance: 20,181
Referee: Antony Gautier (France)

Rheindorf Altach won 6–2 on aggregate.

30 July 2015
21:00

Hajduk Split (Croatia)	2–0	(Norway) Strømsgodset
Balić 67'; Kiš 90+3'	Report

Stadion Poljud, Split
Attendance: 28,000
Referee: Kristo Tohver (Estonia)
6 August 2015
19:00

Strømsgodset (Norway)	0–2	(Croatia) Hajduk Split
	Report	Caktaš 55'; Ohandza 77'

Marienlyst Stadion, Drammen
Attendance: 5,330
Referee: Oliver Drachta (Austria)

Hajduk Split won 4–0 on aggregate.

30 July 2015
19:00

Krasnodar (Russia)	2–0	(Slovakia) Slovan Bratislava
Granqvist 45'; Mamayev 59' (pen.)	Report

Kuban Stadium, Krasnodar
Attendance: 10,420
Referee: Halis Özkahya (Turkey)
6 August 2015
20:15

Slovan Bratislava (Slovakia)	3–3	(Russia) Krasnodar
Vittek 54', 60', 77'	Report	Mamayev 8' (pen.), 11'; Smolov 90+3' (pen.)

Štadión Pasienky, Bratislava
Attendance: 2,852
Referee: Sébastien Delferière (Belgium)

Krasnodar won 5–3 on aggregate.

== Play-off round ==
=== Summary ===
The first legs were played on 20 August, and the second legs were played on 27 August 2015.

Team 1	Agg.	Team 2	1st leg	2nd leg
Rheindorf Altach (Austria)	0–1	(Portugal) Belenenses	0–1	0–0
Žilina (Slovakia)	3–3 (a)	(Spain) Athletic Bilbao	3–2	0–1
Steaua București (Romania)	1–3	(Norway) Rosenborg	0–3	1–0
Zorya Luhansk (Ukraine)	2–4	(Poland) Legia Warsaw	0–1	2–3
Viktoria Plzeň (Czech Republic)	5–0	(Serbia) Vojvodina	3–0	2–0
Milsami Orhei (Moldova)	1–2	(France) Saint-Étienne	1–1	0–1
Ajax (Netherlands)	1–0 (Note: Order of legs reversed after original draw.)	(Czech Republic) Jablonec	1–0	0–0
Young Boys (Switzerland)	0–4	(Azerbaijan) Qarabağ	0–1	0–3
Molde (Norway)	3–3 (a)	(Belgium) Standard Liège	2–0	1–3
PAOK (Greece)	6–1	(Denmark) Brøndby	5–0	1–1
Bordeaux (France)	2–2 (a)	(Kazakhstan) Kairat	1–0	1–2
Lech Poznań (Poland)	4–0	(Hungary) Videoton	3–0	1–0
Dinamo Minsk (Belarus)	2–2 (3–2 p)	(Austria) Red Bull Salzburg	2–0	0–2 (a.e.t.)
Rabotnicki (North Macedonia)	1–2	(Russia) Rubin Kazan	1–1	0–1
Slovan Liberec (Czech Republic)	2–0	(Croatia) Hajduk Split	1–0	1–0
Atromitos (Greece)	0–4	(Turkey) Fenerbahçe	0–1	0–3
Gabala (Azerbaijan)	2–2 (a)	(Greece) Panathinaikos	0–0	2–2
Southampton (England)	1–2	(Denmark) Midtjylland	1–1	0–1
Astra Giurgiu (Romania)	3–4	(Netherlands) AZ	3–2	0–2
Odd (Norway)	5–11	(Germany) Borussia Dortmund	3–4	2–7
Krasnodar (Russia)	5–1	(Finland) HJK	5–1	0–0
Sparta Prague (Czech Republic)	6–4	(Switzerland) Thun	3–1	3–3

=== Matches ===
20 August 2015
20:30

Rheindorf Altach (Austria)	0–1	(Portugal) Belenenses
	Report	Caeiro 13'

Tivoli-Neu, Innsbruck
Attendance: 4,572
Referee: Matej Jug (Slovenia)
27 August 2015
22:30

Belenenses (Portugal)	0–0	(Austria) Rheindorf Altach
	Report

Estádio do Restelo, Lisbon
Attendance: 5,940
Referee: Anthony Taylor (England)

Belenenses won 1–0 on aggregate.

20 August 2015
20:15

Žilina (Slovakia)	3–2	(Spain) Athletic Bilbao
Paur 66'; William 77', 90+4'	Report	Merino 16'; Sola 33'

Štadión pod Dubňom, Žilina
Attendance: 10,175
Referee: Ovidiu Hațegan (Romania)
27 August 2015
20:45

Athletic Bilbao (Spain)	1–0	(Slovakia) Žilina
Elustondo 24'	Report

San Mamés, Bilbao
Attendance: 38,688
Referee: Martin Strömbergsson (Sweden)

3–3 on aggregate; Athletic Bilbao won on away goals.

20 August 2015
20:00

Steaua București (Romania)	0–3	(Norway) Rosenborg
	Report	Mikkelsen 61'; Helland 67'; Jensen 90+3'

Arena Națională, Bucharest
Attendance: 21,204
Referee: Luca Banti (Italy)
27 August 2015
20:00

Rosenborg (Norway)	0–1	(Romania) Steaua București
	Report	Popa 54'

Lerkendal Stadion, Trondheim
Attendance: 14,640
Referee: Bobby Madden (Scotland)

Rosenborg won 3–1 on aggregate.

20 August 2015
19:00

Zorya Luhansk (Ukraine)	0–1	(Poland) Legia Warsaw
	Report	Kucharczyk 48'

Valeriy Lobanovskyi Dynamo Stadium, Kyiv
Attendance: 16,000
Referee: Anastasios Sidiropoulos (Greece)
27 August 2015
21:00

Legia Warsaw (Poland)	3–2	(Ukraine) Zorya Luhansk
Brzyski 16'; Guilherme 62'; Duda 90+5' (pen.)	Report	Khomchenovskyi 39'; Malinovskyi 66'

Polish Army Stadium, Warsaw
Attendance: 23,163
Referee: Tobias Welz (Germany)

Legia Warsaw won 4–2 on aggregate.

20 August 2015
20:50

Viktoria Plzeň (Czech Republic)	3–0	(Serbia) Vojvodina
Kopic 25', 82'; Vaněk 51'	Report

Doosan Arena, Plzeň
Attendance: 10,769
Referee: Javier Estrada Fernández (Spain)
27 August 2015
20:30

Vojvodina (Serbia)	0–2	(Czech Republic) Viktoria Plzeň
	Report	Đurić 19' (o.g.); Ďuriš 60'

Karađorđe Stadium, Novi Sad
Attendance: 7,617
Referee: Michael Koukoulakis (Greece)

Viktoria Plzeň won 5–0 on aggregate.

20 August 2015
19:30

Milsami Orhei (Moldova)	1–1	(France) Saint-Étienne
Bud 56'	Report	Hamouma 40'

Zimbru Stadium, Chișinău (Note: Milsami Orhei played their home match at Zimbru Stadium, Chișinău, instead of their regular stadium CSR Orhei, Orhei.)
Attendance: 6,072
Referee: Paweł Gil (Poland)
27 August 2015
19:30

Saint-Étienne (France)	1–0	(Moldova) Milsami Orhei
Corgnet 15'	Report

Stade Geoffroy-Guichard, Saint-Étienne
Attendance: 22,456
Referee: Aleksei Eskov (Russia)

Saint-Étienne won 2–1 on aggregate.

20 August 2015
19:00

Ajax (Netherlands)	1–0	(Czech Republic) Jablonec
Milik 54' (pen.)	Report

Amsterdam Arena, Amsterdam
Attendance: 30,898
Referee: Tony Chapron (France)
27 August 2015
18:00

Jablonec (Czech Republic)	0–0	(Netherlands) Ajax
	Report

Chance Arena, Jablonec nad Nisou
Attendance: 6,040
Referee: Kenn Hansen (Denmark)

Ajax won 1–0 on aggregate.

20 August 2015
20:00

Young Boys (Switzerland)	0–1	(Azerbaijan) Qarabağ
	Report	Almeida 67'

Stade de Suisse, Bern
Attendance: 6,700
Referee: Vladislav Bezborodov (Russia)
27 August 2015
18:00

Qarabağ (Azerbaijan)	3–0	(Switzerland) Young Boys
Almeida 4' (pen.); Reynaldo 43'; Ismayilov 61'	Report

Tofiq Bahramov Republican Stadium, Baku
Attendance: 29,620
Referee: Gediminas Mažeika (Lithuania)

Qarabağ won 4–0 on aggregate.

20 August 2015
19:00

Molde (Norway)	2–0	(Belgium) Standard Liège
Høiland 24'; Elyounoussi 28'	Report

Aker Stadion, Molde
Attendance: 3,940
Referee: Aleksei Kulbakov (Belarus)
27 August 2015
20:30

Standard Liège (Belgium)	3–1	(Norway) Molde
Knockaert 26'; Santini 48'; Trebel 90+5'	Report	Hussain 42'

Stade Maurice Dufrasne, Liège
Attendance: 12,568
Referee: Alexandru Tudor (Romania)

3–3 on aggregate; Molde won on away goals.

20 August 2015
19:00

PAOK (Greece)	5–0	(Denmark) Brøndby
Mak 17', 80', 82'; Pelkas 36'; Rodrigues 51'	Report

Toumba Stadium, Thessaloniki
Attendance: 20,106
Referee: Alberto Undiano Mallenco (Spain)
27 August 2015
20:00

Brøndby (Denmark)	1–1	(Greece) PAOK
Rashani 27'	Report	Costa 21'

Brøndby Stadium, Brøndbyvester
Attendance: 6,630
Referee: Paolo Tagliavento (Italy)

PAOK won 6–1 on aggregate.

20 August 2015
20:30

Bordeaux (France)	1–0	(Kazakhstan) Kairat
Khazri 27'	Report

Nouveau Stade de Bordeaux, Bordeaux
Attendance: 24,795
Referee: Arnold Hunter (Northern Ireland)
27 August 2015
16:45

Kairat (Kazakhstan)	2–1	(France) Bordeaux
Guilbert 1' (o.g.); Kuat 66'	Report	Crivelli 76'

Central Stadium, Almaty
Attendance: 23,800
Referee: Bas Nijhuis (Netherlands)

2–2 on aggregate; Bordeaux won on away goals.

20 August 2015
21:00

Lech Poznań (Poland)	3–0	(Hungary) Videoton
Linetty 11'; Thomalla 57'; Trałka 68'	Report

INEA Stadion, Poznań
Attendance: 14,133
Referee: Oliver Drachta (Austria)
27 August 2015
19:00

Videoton (Hungary)	0–1	(Poland) Lech Poznań
	Report	Kędziora 57'

Sóstói Stadion, Székesfehérvár
Attendance: 2,815
Referee: Stefan Johannesson (Sweden)

Lech Poznań won 4–0 on aggregate.

20 August 2015
18:00

Dinamo Minsk (Belarus)	2–0	(Austria) Red Bull Salzburg
Rassadkin 57'; Adamović 90+3'	Report

OSK Brestskiy, Brest
Attendance: 9,952
Referee: Miroslav Zelinka (Czech Republic)
27 August 2015
20:30

Red Bull Salzburg (Austria)	2–0 (a.e.t.)	(Belarus) Dinamo Minsk
Minamino 11'; Soriano 58'	Report
Penalties
Hinteregger (penalty scored); Soriano (penalty scored); Minamino (penalty missed); Atanga (penalty missed); Berisha (penalty missed)	2–3	(penalty scored) Bećiraj; (penalty missed) Karytska; (penalty scored) Begunov; (penalty scored) Palitsevich

Red Bull Arena, Wals-Siezenheim
Attendance: 7,849
Referee: Kevin Blom (Netherlands)

2–2 on aggregate; Dinamo Minsk won 3–2 on penalties.

20 August 2015
20:00

Rabotnicki (North Macedonia)	1–1	(Russia) Rubin Kazan
Ristevski 85'	Report	Karadeniz 68'

Philip II Arena, Skopje
Attendance: 10,000
Referee: István Vad (Hungary)
27 August 2015
18:00

Rubin Kazan (Russia)	1–0	(North Macedonia) Rabotnicki
Carlos Eduardo 35'	Report

Central Stadium, Kazan
Attendance: 4,231
Referee: Hüseyin Göçek (Turkey)

Rubin Kazan won 2–1 on aggregate.

20 August 2015
19:00

Slovan Liberec (Czech Republic)	1–0	(Croatia) Hajduk Split
Pokorný 79'	Report

Stadion u Nisy, Liberec
Attendance: 8,530
Referee: David Fernández Borbalán (Spain)
27 August 2015
20:00

Hajduk Split (Croatia)	0–1	(Czech Republic) Slovan Liberec
	Report	Šural 23'

Stadion Poljud, Split
Attendance: 33,000
Referee: Artur Soares Dias (Portugal)

Slovan Liberec won 2–0 on aggregate.

20 August 2015
20:00

Atromitos (Greece)	0–1	(Turkey) Fenerbahçe
	Report	Van Persie 90'

Peristeri Stadium, Peristeri
Attendance: 3,328
Referee: Daniele Orsato (Italy)
27 August 2015
20:00

Fenerbahçe (Turkey)	3–0	(Greece) Atromitos
Fernandão 7', 78'; Harbunow 59' (o.g.)	Report

Şükrü Saracoğlu Stadium, Istanbul
Attendance: 33,121
Referee: Ivan Bebek (Croatia)

Fenerbahçe won 4–0 on aggregate.

20 August 2015
18:00

Gabala (Azerbaijan)	0–0	(Greece) Panathinaikos
	Report

Bakcell Arena, Baku
Attendance: 10,950
Referee: Andre Marriner (England)
27 August 2015
20:00

Panathinaikos (Greece)	2–2	(Azerbaijan) Gabala
Berg 34'; Nano 78'	Report	Dodô 6', 60'

Leoforos Alexandras Stadium, Athens
Attendance: 13,956
Referee: Ivan Kružliak (Slovakia)

2–2 on aggregate; Gabala won on away goals.

20 August 2015
21:00

Southampton (England)	1–1	(Denmark) Midtjylland
Rodriguez 56' (pen.)	Report	Sparv 45'

St Mary's Stadium, Southampton
Attendance: 28,890
Referee: Clément Turpin (France)
27 August 2015
20:45

Midtjylland (Denmark)	1–0	(England) Southampton
Rasmussen 28'	Report

MCH Arena, Herning
Attendance: 9,481
Referee: Liran Liany (Israel)

Midtjylland won 2–1 on aggregate.

20 August 2015
18:00

Astra Giurgiu (Romania)	3–2	(Netherlands) AZ
Boldrin 25'; Alibec 41'; Dandea 45+3'	Report	Henriksen 11'; Janssen 13'

Stadionul Marin Anastasovici, Giurgiu
Attendance: 3,712
Referee: Slavko Vinčić (Slovenia)
27 August 2015
20:00

AZ (Netherlands)	2–0	(Romania) Astra Giurgiu
Van der Linden 80'; Mühren 85'	Report

AFAS Stadion, Alkmaar
Attendance: 9,679
Referee: Robert Schörgenhofer (Austria)

AZ won 4–3 on aggregate.

20 August 2015
20:30

Odd (Norway)	3–4	(Germany) Borussia Dortmund
Samuelsen 1'; Nordkvelle 20'; Ruud 22'	Report	Aubameyang 34', 76'; Kagawa 47'; Mkhitaryan 85'

Skagerak Arena, Skien
Attendance: 12,436
Referee: Jorge Sousa (Portugal)
27 August 2015
20:30

Borussia Dortmund (Germany)	7–2	(Norway) Odd
Mkhitaryan 25'; Reus 27', 32', 57'; Kagawa 40', 90'; Gündoğan 51'	Report	Halvorsen 19'; Berg 64'

Signal Iduna Park, Dortmund
Attendance: 64,200
Referee: Yevhen Aranovskiy (Ukraine)

Borussia Dortmund won 11–5 on aggregate.

20 August 2015
19:00

Krasnodar (Russia)	5–1	(Finland) HJK
Ojala 8' (o.g.); Mamayev 10' (pen.); Smolov 57' (pen.); Wánderson 62'; Gazinsky 64'	Report	Jallow 18'

Kuban Stadium, Krasnodar
Attendance: 15,425
Referee: Marijo Strahonja (Croatia)
27 August 2015
19:00

HJK (Finland)	0–0	(Russia) Krasnodar
	Report

Sonera Stadium, Helsinki
Attendance: 2,953
Referee: Felix Zwayer (Germany)

Krasnodar won 5–1 on aggregate.

20 August 2015
19:00

Sparta Prague (Czech Republic)	3–1	(Switzerland) Thun
Costa 43'; Dočkal 45+1', 90+4'	Report	Sutter 5'

Generali Arena, Prague
Attendance: 12,448
Referee: Danny Makkelie (Netherlands)
27 August 2015
19:30

Thun (Switzerland)	3–3	(Czech Republic) Sparta Prague
Ferreira 33', 81'; Munsy 50'	Report	Dočkal 10'; Hušbauer 21'; Costa 71'

Stockhorn Arena, Thun
Attendance: 6,024
Referee: Ruddy Buquet (France)

Sparta Prague won 6–4 on aggregate.
