= Arnold Hunter =

Northern Irish football referee

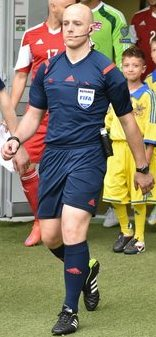
- Hunter in 2015
- Born: 15 March 1980 (age 46); Enniskillen
- Other occupation: http://www.fwrefs.co.uk/

Domestic
Years	League	Role

International
Years	League	Role
2011–	FIFA listed	Referee

Arnold Hunter (born 15 March 1980) is a Northern Irish professional football referee. He has been a full international for FIFA since 2011.

Hunter became a referee following a playing career, in which he took part as a goalkeeper. On 7 July 2011, Hunter made his European debut in a match between FC Lusitanos and NK Varaždin in a UEFA Europa League first qualifying round match. His first international match was between Armenia and Malta on 7 June 2013. Hunter's first Europa League group stage appointment was for the match between Villarreal and Apollon Limassol in October 2014.
