= Marcin Borski =

Polish football referee (born 1973)

- Full name: Marcin Borski
- Born: 13 April 1973 (age 53); Warsaw, Poland

Domestic
| Years | League | Role |
| 1999– | Ekstraklasa | Referee |

International
| Years | League | Role |
| 2006– | FIFA listed | Referee |

Marcin Borski (born 13 April 1973) is a Polish football referee. He has been a Polish top division referee since 1999 and on the FIFA referees list since 2006. He was the only Polish referee nominated for UEFA Euro 2012.

Borski has served as a referee in international competitions, including the 2010 and 2014 World Cup qualifiers.

He used to work as stock exchange analyst for Warsaw Stock Exchange and Ministry of Treasure of Republic of Poland before becoming full- time professional referee in 2008.

In April 2008 he became participant of UEFA Talents Programme, special mentoring programme aimed to develop young, promising referees. He participated in this programme for two consecutive years.

In April 2009 he was chosen by 'Pilka Nozna" magazine as the best referee of 2008/09 season of Polish top division. In December 2011 he was nominated by UEFA to be fourth official during the UEFA Euro 2012 tournament. At the same time he was promoted to UEFA Elite Development category of referees.
