= Abdoulaye Diallo (disambiguation) =

Abdoulaye Diallo (born 1992) is a French-Senegalese footballer. The name may also refer to:

- Abdoulaye Diallo (footballer, born 1963), Senegalese footballer
- Abdoulaye Diallo (footballer, born October 1992), Senegalese footballer
- Abdoulaye Diallo (footballer, born 1996), Senegalese footballer
- Abdoulaye Samba Diallo, Senegalese athlete
