= 2015–16 UEFA Europa League qualifying (first and second round matches) =

European football competition

This page summarises the matches of the first and second qualifying rounds of 2015–16 UEFA Europa League qualifying.

Times are CEST (UTC+2), as listed by UEFA (local times, if different, are in parentheses).

== First qualifying round ==
=== Summary ===
The first legs were played on 30 June and 2 July, and the second legs were played on 7 and 9 July 2015.

Team 1	Agg.	Team 2	1st leg	2nd leg
Víkingur Reykjavík (Iceland)	2–3	(Slovenia) Koper	0–1	2–2
Sheriff Tiraspol (Moldova)	0–3	(Norway) Odd	0–3	0–0
Kukësi (Albania)	2–0	(Belarus) Torpedo-BelAZ Zhodino	2–0	0–0
Alashkert (Armenia)	2–2 (a)	(Scotland) St Johnstone	1–0	1–2
Jelgava (Latvia)	3–3 (a)	(Bulgaria) Litex Lovech	1–1	2–2
Newtown (Wales)	4–2	(Malta) Valletta	2–1	2–1
Dinamo Tbilisi (Georgia (country))	2–3	(Azerbaijan) Gabala	2–1	0–2
Renova (North Macedonia)	1–5	(Moldova) Dacia Chișinău	0–1	1–4
Olimpic (Bosnia and Herzegovina)	1–1 (a)	(Slovakia) Spartak Trnava	1–1	0–0
West Ham United (England)	4–0 (Note: Order of legs reversed after original draw.)	(Andorra) Lusitanos	3–0	1–0
Glenavon (Northern Ireland)	1–5	(Belarus) Shakhtyor Soligorsk	1–2	0–3
Differdange 03 (Luxembourg)	4–3	(Wales) Bala Town	3–1	1–2
Shkëndija (North Macedonia)	1–1 (a)	(Scotland) Aberdeen	1–1	0–0
Víkingur Gøta (Faroe Islands)	0–2	(Norway) Rosenborg	0–2	0–0
SJK (Finland)	0–2	(Iceland) FH	0–1	0–1
Linfield (Northern Ireland)	5–4	(Faroe Islands) NSÍ	2–0	3–4
Brøndby (Denmark)	11–0	(San Marino) Juvenes/Dogana	9–0	2–0
MTK Budapest (Hungary)	1–3	(Serbia) Vojvodina	0–0	1–3
Skonto (Latvia)	4–1	(Republic of Ireland) St Patrick's Athletic	2–1	2–0
Lahti (Finland)	2–7	(Sweden) IF Elfsborg	2–2	0–5
Atlantas (Lithuania)	1–5	(Bulgaria) Beroe Stara Zagora	0–2	1–3
Debrecen (Hungary)	3–2	(Montenegro) Sutjeska	3–0	0–2
Ordabasy (Kazakhstan)	1–2	(Israel) Beitar Jerusalem	0–0	1–2
Balzan (Malta)	0–3	(Bosnia and Herzegovina) Željezničar	0–2	0–1
Sillamäe Kalev (Estonia)	3–7	(Croatia) Hajduk Split	1–1	2–6
Budućnost Podgorica (Montenegro)	1–3	(Latvia) Spartaks Jūrmala	1–3	0–0
Red Star Belgrade (Serbia)	1–4	(Kazakhstan) Kairat	0–2	1–2
Flora (Estonia)	1–2	(North Macedonia) Rabotnicki	1–0	0–2
Sant Julià (Andorra)	0–4	(Denmark) Randers	0–1	0–3
Saxan (Moldova)	0–4	(Cyprus) Apollon Limassol	0–2	0–2
Progrès Niederkorn (Luxembourg)	0–3	(Republic of Ireland) Shamrock Rovers	0–0	0–3
Aktobe (Kazakhstan)	0–1	(Estonia) Nõmme Kalju	0–1	0–0
Dinamo Batumi (Georgia (country))	1–2	(Cyprus) Omonia	1–0	0–2
Kruoja Pakruojis (Lithuania)	0–9	(Poland) Jagiellonia Białystok	0–1	0–8
Shirak (Armenia)	3–2	(Bosnia and Herzegovina) Zrinjski Mostar	2–0	1–2
Cork City (Republic of Ireland)	2–3	(Iceland) KR	1–1	1–2 (a.e.t.)
Go Ahead Eagles (Netherlands)	2–5	(Hungary) Ferencváros	1–1	1–4
Trakai (Lithuania)	7–1	(Faroe Islands) HB	3–0	4–1
Laçi (Albania)	1–1 (a)	(Azerbaijan) Inter Baku	1–1	0–0
VPS (Finland)	2–6	(Sweden) AIK	2–2	0–4
UCD (Republic of Ireland)	2–2 (a)	(Luxembourg) F91 Dudelange	1–0	1–2
Domžale (Slovenia)	0–1	(Serbia) Čukarički	0–1	0–0
Glentoran (Northern Ireland)	1–7	(Slovakia) Žilina	1–4	0–3
Strømsgodset (Norway)	4–1	(Albania) Partizani	3–1	1–0
Neftçi (Azerbaijan)	3–3 (a)	(Montenegro) Mladost Podgorica	2–2	1–1
Celje (Slovenia)	1–4	(Poland) Śląsk Wrocław	0–1	1–3
La Fiorita (San Marino)	1–10	(Liechtenstein) Vaduz	0–5	1–5
Birkirkara (Malta)	3–1	(Armenia) Ulisses	0–0	3–1
Airbus UK Broughton (Wales)	3–5	(Croatia) Lokomotiva Zagreb	1–3	2–2
Botoșani (Romania)	4–2	(Georgia (country)) Tskhinvali	1–1	3–1
Europa (Gibraltar)	0–9	(Slovakia) Slovan Bratislava	0–6	0–3

=== Matches ===
2 July 2015
21:15

Víkingur Reykjavík (Iceland)	0–1	(Slovenia) Koper
	Report	Pučko 77'

Víkingsvöllur, Reykjavík
Attendance: 1,010
Referee: Andrew Dallas (Scotland)
9 July 2015
20:30

Koper (Slovenia)	2–2	(Iceland) Víkingur Reykjavík
Pučko 18'; Palčič 61'	Report	Kristinsson 51', 76'

Bonifika Stadium, Koper
Attendance: 1,500
Referee: István Kovács (Romania)

Koper won 3–2 on aggregate.

2 July 2015
19:00

Sheriff Tiraspol (Moldova)	0–3	(Norway) Odd
	Report	Akabueze 2'; Johnsen 11'; Hagen 28'

Sheriff Stadium, Tiraspol
Attendance: 6,628
Referee: Tsvetan Krastev (Bulgaria)
9 July 2015
19:00

Odd (Norway)	0–0	(Moldova) Sheriff Tiraspol
	Report

Skagerak Arena, Skien
Attendance: 3,981
Referee: Dejan Jakimovski (Macedonia)

Odd won 3–0 on aggregate.

2 July 2015
18:00

Kukësi (Albania)	2–0	(Belarus) Torpedo-BelAZ Zhodino
Carioca 9'; Pejić 54'	Report

Qemal Stafa National Stadium, Tirana (Note: Kukësi played their home matches at Qemal Stafa National Stadium, Tirana, instead of their regular stadium Zeqir Ymeri Stadium, Kukës.)
Attendance: 1,500
Referee: Sascha Amhof (Switzerland)
9 July 2015
18:00

Torpedo-BelAZ Zhodino (Belarus)	0–0	(Albania) Kukësi
	Report

Torpedo Stadium, Zhodino
Attendance: 2,950
Referee: Sergiu Derenov (Moldova)

Kukësi won 2–0 on aggregate.

2 July 2015
17:00

Alashkert (Armenia)	1–0	(Scotland) St Johnstone
Manasyan 59'	Report

Vazgen Sargsyan Republican Stadium, Yerevan (Note: Alashkert played their home matches at Vazgen Sargsyan Republican Stadium, Yerevan, instead of their regular stadium Alashkert Stadium, Yerevan.)
Attendance: 2,600
Referee: Jakob Kehlet (Denmark)
9 July 2015
20:45

St Johnstone (Scotland)	2–1	(Armenia) Alashkert
O'Halloran 34'; McKay 87'	Report	Gyozalyan 74'

McDiarmid Park, Perth
Attendance: 5,764
Referee: Fredy Fautrel (France)

2–2 on aggregate; Alashkert won on away goals.

2 July 2015
18:00

Jelgava (Latvia)	1–1	(Bulgaria) Litex Lovech
Malašenoks 83'	Report	Bozhikov 50'

Olympic Sports Center of Zemgale, Jelgava
Attendance: 1,560
Referee: Tiago Martins (Portugal)
9 July 2015
19:45

Litex Lovech (Bulgaria)	2–2	(Latvia) Jelgava
Johnsen 25', 56'	Report	Ošs 11'; Diallo 60'

Lovech Stadium, Lovech
Attendance: 1,235
Referee: Edin Jakupović (Bosnia and Herzegovina)

3–3 on aggregate; Jelgava won on away goals.

2 July 2015
20:15

Newtown (Wales)	2–1	(Malta) Valletta
Boundford 40'; Oswell 90+1'	Report	Jhonnattann 73'

Latham Park, Newtown
Attendance: 1,420
Referee: Vladimir Vnuk (Slovakia)
9 July 2015
20:45

Valletta (Malta)	1–2	(Wales) Newtown
Fidjeu 46'	Report	Oswell 7'; Owen 85'

Hibernians Ground, Paola (Note: Valletta played their home match at Hibernians Ground, Paola, instead of their regular stadium National Stadium, Ta' Qali.)
Attendance: 1,914
Referee: Mihály Fábián (Hungary)

Newtown won 4–2 on aggregate.

2 July 2015
18:00

Dinamo Tbilisi (Georgia (country))	2–1	(Azerbaijan) Gabala
Jighauri 65'; Papunashvili 84'	Report	Huseynov 74'

Boris Paichadze Dinamo Arena, Tbilisi
Attendance: 7,500
Referee: Roi Reinshreiber (Israel)
9 July 2015
18:00

Gabala (Azerbaijan)	2–0	(Georgia (country)) Dinamo Tbilisi
Mammadov 88'; Antonov 90+3'	Report

City Stadium, Qabala
Attendance: 4,400
Referee: Amaury Delerue (France)

Gabala won 3–2 on aggregate.

30 June 2015
21:00

Renova (North Macedonia)	0–1	(Moldova) Dacia Chișinău
	Report	Roșca 12'

Philip II Arena, Skopje (Note: Renova played their home match at Philip II Arena, Skopje, instead of their regular stadium Gradski stadion, Tetovo.)
Attendance: 1,500
Referee: Eiko Saar (Estonia)
9 July 2015
17:00

Dacia Chișinău (Moldova)	4–1	(North Macedonia) Renova
Cociuc 9'; Jardan 55'; Pavlov 60'; Lozoviy 88'	Report	Emini 32'

CSR Orhei, Orhei (Note: Dacia Chișinău played their first qualifying round home match at CSR Orhei, Orhei, and second qualifying round match at Zimbru Stadium, Chișinău, instead of their regular stadium Stadionul Moldova, Speia.)
Attendance: 800
Referee: Denis Scherbakov (Belarus)

Dacia Chișinău won 5–1 on aggregate.

2 July 2015
18:00

Olimpic (Bosnia and Herzegovina)	1–1	(Slovakia) Spartak Trnava
Pandža 14'	Report	Halilović 70'

Asim Ferhatović Hase Stadium, Sarajevo (Note: Olimpic played their home match at Asim Ferhatović Hase Stadium, Sarajevo, instead of their regular stadium Stadion Otoka, Sarajevo.)
Attendance: 2,622
Referee: Daniel Stefański (Poland)
9 July 2015
20:05

Spartak Trnava (Slovakia)	0–0	(Bosnia and Herzegovina) Olimpic
	Report

Štadión FC ViOn, Zlaté Moravce (Note: Spartak Trnava played their home matches at Štadión FC ViOn, Zlaté Moravce, instead of their regular stadium Štadión Antona Malatinského, Trnava, due to renovation.)
Attendance: 3,011
Referee: Rob Rogers (Republic of Ireland)

1–1 on aggregate; Spartak Trnava won on away goals.

2 July 2015
20:45

West Ham United (England)	3–0	(Andorra) Lusitanos
Sakho 40', 45+2'; Tomkins 58'	Report

Boleyn Ground, London
Attendance: 34,966
Referee: Vadims Direktorenko (Latvia)
9 July 2015
19:30

Lusitanos (Andorra)	0–1	(England) West Ham United
	Report	Lee 21'

Estadi Comunal, Andorra la Vella
Attendance: 837
Referee: Anders Poulsen (Denmark)

West Ham United won 4–0 on aggregate.

2 July 2015
20:45

Glenavon (Northern Ireland)	1–2	(Belarus) Shakhtyor Soligorsk
Patton 86'	Report	Afanasyev 2'; Kamarowski 30'

Mourneview Park, Lurgan
Attendance: 640
Referee: Dag Vidar Hafsås (Norway)
9 July 2015
18:30

Shakhtyor Soligorsk (Belarus)	3–0	(Northern Ireland) Glenavon
Yurevich 8'; Yanush 66'; Kamarowski 86'	Report

Stroitel Stadium, Salihorsk
Attendance: 3,200
Referee: Aleksander Gauzer (Kazakhstan)

Shakhtyor Soligorsk won 5–1 on aggregate.

2 July 2015
19:00

Differdange 03 (Luxembourg)	3–1	(Wales) Bala Town
Er Rafik 4'; Caron 7'; Sinani 26'	Report	Sheridan 38'

Stade Municipal, Differdange
Attendance: 1,223
Referee: Milan Ilić (Serbia)
9 July 2015
20:00

Bala Town (Wales)	2–1	(Luxembourg) Differdange 03
Murtagh 49'; Sheridan 83'	Report	Er Rafik 90+5'

The Corbett Sports Stadium, Rhyl (Note: Bala Town played their home match at The Corbett Sports Stadium, Rhyl, instead of their regular stadium Maes Tegid, Bala.)
Attendance: 1,049
Referee: Jens Maae (Denmark)

Differdange 03 won 4–3 on aggregate.

2 July 2015
21:05

Shkëndija (North Macedonia)	1–1	(Scotland) Aberdeen
Kirovski 84'	Report	McGinn 79'

Philip II Arena, Skopje (Note: Shkëndija played their home match at Philip II Arena, Skopje, instead of their regular stadium Gradski stadion, Tetovo.)
Attendance: 7,040
Referee: Tolga Ozkalfa (Turkey)
9 July 2015
20:45

Aberdeen (Scotland)	0–0	(North Macedonia) Shkëndija
	Report

Pittodrie Stadium, Aberdeen
Attendance: 14,112
Referee: Nikolaj Hänni (Switzerland)

1–1 on aggregate; Aberdeen won on away goals.

2 July 2015
20:00

Víkingur Gøta (Faroe Islands)	0–2	(Norway) Rosenborg
	Report	Søderlund 82', 90+2'

Svangaskarð, Toftir (Note: Víkingur Gøta played their home match at Svangaskarð, Toftir, instead of their regular stadium Sarpugerði, Norðragøta.)
Attendance: 1,057
Referee: Bryn Markham-Jones (Wales)
9 July 2015
19:00

Rosenborg (Norway)	0–0	(Faroe Islands) Víkingur Gøta
	Report

Lerkendal Stadion, Trondheim
Attendance: 4,572
Referee: Sergejus Slyva (Lithuania)

Rosenborg won 2–0 on aggregate.

2 July 2015
18:00

SJK (Finland)	0–1	(Iceland) FH
	Report	Lennon 56'

Sonera Stadium, Helsinki (Note: SJK played their home match at Sonera Stadium, Helsinki, instead of their regular stadium Seinäjoen keskuskenttä, Seinäjoki.)
Attendance: 2,678
Referee: Tihomir Pejin (Croatia)
9 July 2015
21:15

FH (Iceland)	1–0	(Finland) SJK
K. F. Finnbogason 90+1'	Report

Kaplakrikavöllur, Hafnarfjörður
Attendance: 1,473
Referee: Mervyn Smyth (Northern Ireland)

FH won 2–0 on aggregate.

2 July 2015
20:45

Linfield (Northern Ireland)	2–0	(Faroe Islands) NSÍ
Waterworth 57'; Bates 73'	Report

Windsor Park, Belfast
Attendance: 1,824
Referee: Petr Ardeleanu (Czech Republic)
9 July 2015
20:00

NSÍ (Faroe Islands)	4–3	(Northern Ireland) Linfield
K. Olsen 17'; Justinussen 19', 85'; Joensen 45+1'	Report	Re. Glendinning 13'; Bates 33'; Waterworth 69'

Svangaskarð, Toftir (Note: NSÍ Runavík played their home match at Svangaskarð, Toftir, instead of their regular stadium Við Løkin, Runavík.)
Attendance: 550
Referee: Jovan Kaluđerović (Montenegro)

Linfield won 5–4 on aggregate.

2 July 2015
19:00

Brøndby (Denmark)	9–0	(San Marino) Juvenes/Dogana
Elmander 6', 16'; da Silva 14'; Pukki 22'; Holst 23'; Larsson 35'; Rashani 55', 87'; Corlu 66'	Report

Brøndby Stadium, Brøndbyvester
Attendance: 8,408
Referee: Adrian Azzopardi (Malta)
9 July 2015
20:30

Juvenes/Dogana (San Marino)	0–2	(Denmark) Brøndby
	Report	Elmander 49'; Rashani 59'

San Marino Stadium, Serravalle
Attendance: 814
Referee: Laurent Kopriwa (Luxembourg)

Brøndby won 11–0 on aggregate.

2 July 2015
20:30

MTK Budapest (Hungary)	0–0	(Serbia) Vojvodina
	Report

Ferenc Szusza Stadium, Budapest (Note: MTK Budapest played their home match at Ferenc Szusza Stadium, Budapest, instead of their temporary stadium Bozsik Stadion, Budapest.)
Attendance: 902
Referee: Paolo Valeri (Italy)
9 July 2015
20:30

Vojvodina (Serbia)	3–1	(Hungary) MTK Budapest
Stanisavljević 14'; Mrdaković 40'; Ivanić 51'	Report	Střeštík 3'

Karađorđe Stadium, Novi Sad
Attendance: 8,460
Referee: Tore Hansen (Norway)

Vojvodina won 3–1 on aggregate.

2 July 2015
18:00

Skonto (Latvia)	2–1	(Republic of Ireland) St Patrick's Athletic
Karašausks 38'; Gutkovskis 65'	Report	Greene 21'

Skonto Stadium, Riga
Attendance: 1,780
Referee: Fran Jović (Croatia)
9 July 2015
20:45

St Patrick's Athletic (Republic of Ireland)	0–2	(Latvia) Skonto
	Report	Sorokins 37'; Karašausks 59' (pen.)

Richmond Park, Dublin
Attendance: 2,354
Referee: Tomasz Musiał (Poland)

Skonto won 4–1 on aggregate.

2 July 2015
18:00

Lahti (Finland)	2–2	(Sweden) IF Elfsborg
Lagerblom 25'; Alves 61'	Report	Rohdén 15'; Prodell 59'

Lahti Stadium, Lahti
Attendance: 3,152
Referee: Nikola Dabanović (Montenegro)
9 July 2015
18:00

IF Elfsborg (Sweden)	5–0	(Finland) Lahti
Svensson 11'; Claesson 21' (pen.); Rohdén 33'; Prodell 70'; Nilsson 81'	Report

Borås Arena, Borås
Attendance: 3,304
Referee: Sandro Schärer (Switzerland)

IF Elfsborg won 7–2 on aggregate.

2 July 2015
18:00

Atlantas (Lithuania)	0–2	(Bulgaria) Beroe Stara Zagora
	Report	Delev 60'; Bozhilov 84'

Central Stadium, Klaipėda
Attendance: 3,000
Referee: Vilhjálmur Alvar Þórarinsson (Iceland)
9 July 2015
19:00

Beroe Stara Zagora (Bulgaria)	3–1	(Lithuania) Atlantas
Delev 7', 45', 67'	Report	Vėževičius 65'

Beroe Stadium, Stara Zagora
Attendance: 7,432
Referee: Orkhan Mammadov (Azerbaijan)

Beroe Stara Zagora won 5–1 on aggregate.

2 July 2015
18:30

Debrecen (Hungary)	3–0	(Montenegro) Sutjeska
Mihelič 16'; Brković 71'; Sidibe 74'	Report

Nagyerdei Stadion, Debrecen
Attendance: 5,744
Referee: Raymond Crangle (Northern Ireland)
9 July 2015
17:30

Sutjeska (Montenegro)	2–0	(Hungary) Debrecen
Fukui 53'; Božović 81' (pen.)	Report

Gradski stadion, Nikšić
Attendance: 1,214
Referee: Erik Lambrechts (Belgium)

Debrecen won 3–2 on aggregate.

2 July 2015
14:00

Ordabasy (Kazakhstan)	0–0	(Israel) Beitar Jerusalem
	Report

Kazhimukan Munaitpasov Stadium, Shymkent
Attendance: 11,600
Referee: Dumitru Muntean (Moldova)
9 July 2015
19:00

Beitar Jerusalem (Israel)	2–1	(Kazakhstan) Ordabasy
Atzili 17'; Gabay 60'	Report	Petrov 66'

Teddy Stadium, Jerusalem
Attendance: 14,000
Referee: Radek Příhoda (Czech Republic)

Beitar Jerusalem won 2–1 on aggregate.

30 June 2015
17:45

Balzan (Malta)	0–2	(Bosnia and Herzegovina) Željezničar
	Report	Bajić 4' (pen.), 13'

Hibernians Ground, Paola (Note: Balzan played their home match at Hibernians Ground, Paola, instead of their regular stadium National Stadium, Ta' Qali.)
Attendance: 627
Referee: Dennis Antamo (Finland)
9 July 2015
21:15

Željezničar (Bosnia and Herzegovina)	1–0	(Malta) Balzan
D. Sadiković 68'	Report

Asim Ferhatović Hase Stadium, Sarajevo (Note: Željezničar played their home matches at Asim Ferhatović Hase Stadium, Sarajevo, instead of their regular stadium Stadion Grbavica, Sarajevo.)
Attendance: 5,500
Referee: Vasilis Dimitriou (Cyprus)

Željezničar won 3–0 on aggregate.

2 July 2015
18:30

Sillamäe Kalev (Estonia)	1–1	(Croatia) Hajduk Split
Silich 40'	Report	Caktaš 6' (pen.)

Rakvere linnastaadion, Rakvere (Note: Sillamäe Kalev played their home match at Rakvere linnastaadion, Rakvere, instead of their regular stadium Sillamäe Kalevi Stadium, Sillamäe.)
Attendance: 750
Referee: Juan Martínez Munuera (Spain)
9 July 2015
19:00

Hajduk Split (Croatia)	6–2	(Estonia) Sillamäe Kalev
Balić 15'; Caktaš 45+1'; Ohandza 56', 63'; Vlašić 72'; Maglica 88'	Report	Russo 36', 41'

Stadion Hrvatski vitezovi, Dugopolje (Note: Hajduk Split played their first qualifying round home match at Stadion Hrvatski vitezovi, Dugopolje, instead of their regular stadium Stadion Poljud, Split, which was going to host the Ultra Europe festival the following weekend.)
Attendance: 4,500
Referee: Stavros Tritsonis (Greece)

Hajduk Split won 7–3 on aggregate.

2 July 2015
20:30

Budućnost Podgorica (Montenegro)	1–3	(Latvia) Spartaks Jūrmala
Raičević 6'	Report	Bulvītis 22', 74' (pen.); Mickēvičs 42'

Stadion pod Goricom, Podgorica
Attendance: 4,072
Referee: Oleksandr Derdo (Ukraine)
9 July 2015
18:00

Spartaks Jūrmala (Latvia)	0–0	(Montenegro) Budućnost Podgorica
	Report

Olympic Sports Center of Zemgale, Jelgava (Note: Spartaks Jūrmala played their home matches at Olympic Sports Center of Zemgale, Jelgava, instead of their regular stadium Slokas Stadium, Jūrmala.)
Attendance: 1,018
Referee: Peter Kralović (Slovakia)

Spartaks Jūrmala won 3–1 on aggregate.

2 July 2015
20:45

Red Star Belgrade (Serbia)	0–2	(Kazakhstan) Kairat
	Report	Gohou 45'; Kuantayev 64'

Rajko Mitić Stadium, Belgrade
Attendance: 25,211
Referee: Bartosz Frankowski (Poland)
9 July 2015
16:00

Kairat (Kazakhstan)	2–1	(Serbia) Red Star Belgrade
Islamkhan 29'; Kuat 47'	Report	Savićević 85' (pen.)

Central Stadium, Almaty
Attendance: 21,550
Referee: Barış Şimşek (Turkey)

Kairat won 4–1 on aggregate.

2 July 2015
18:00

Flora (Estonia)	1–0	(North Macedonia) Rabotnicki
Gussev 59'	Report

A. Le Coq Arena, Tallinn
Attendance: 1,236
Referee: Mohammed Al-Hakim (Sweden)
9 July 2015
20:00

Rabotnicki (North Macedonia)	2–0	(Estonia) Flora
Anene 48'; Altiparmakovski 54'	Report

Philip II Arena, Skopje
Attendance: 1,690
Referee: Markus Hameter (Austria)

Rabotnicki won 2–1 on aggregate.

2 July 2015
18:00

Sant Julià (Andorra)	0–1	(Denmark) Randers
	Report	Borring 22'

Estadi Comunal, Andorra la Vella
Attendance: 350
Referee: Tim Marshall (Northern Ireland)
9 July 2015
19:05

Randers (Denmark)	3–0	(Andorra) Sant Julià
Amini 42'; Babayan 72'; Ishak 90+3'	Report

Energi Viborg Arena, Viborg (Note: Randers played their first qualifying round home match at Energi Viborg Arena, Viborg, instead of their regular stadium AutoC Park Randers, Randers, due to a new turf being laid.)
Attendance: 1,456
Referee: Giorgi Vadachkoria (Georgia)

Randers won 4–0 on aggregate.

2 July 2015
19:00

Saxan (Moldova)	0–2	(Cyprus) Apollon Limassol
	Report	João Pedro 33'; Papoulis 89'

Zimbru Stadium, Chișinău (Note: Saxan played their home match at Zimbru Stadium, Chișinău, instead of their regular stadium Ceadîr-Lunga Stadium, Ceadîr-Lunga.)
Attendance: 2,535
Referee: Denis Izmailov (Kazakhstan)
9 July 2015
19:00

Apollon Limassol (Cyprus)	2–0	(Moldova) Saxan
Stojanović 2'; Papoulis 61'	Report

Antonis Papadopoulos Stadium, Larnaca (Note: Apollon Limassol played their home matches at Antonis Papadopoulos Stadium, Larnaca, instead of their regular stadium Tsirion Stadium, Limassol.)
Attendance: 3,800
Referee: Srđan Jovanović (Serbia)

Apollon Limassol won 4–0 on aggregate.

30 June 2015
19:00

Progrès Niederkorn (Luxembourg)	0–0	(Republic of Ireland) Shamrock Rovers
	Report

Stade Municipal, Differdange (Note: Progrès Niederkorn played their home match at Stade Municipal, Differdange, instead of their regular stadium Stade Jos Haupert, Niederkorn.)
Attendance: 1,451
Referee: Zaven Hovhannisyan (Armenia)
7 July 2015
21:00

Shamrock Rovers (Republic of Ireland)	3–0	(Luxembourg) Progrès Niederkorn
Webster 21'; Waters 41', 57'	Report

Tallaght Stadium, Tallaght
Attendance: 3,250
Referee: Dominik Ouschan (Austria)

Shamrock Rovers won 3–0 on aggregate.

2 July 2015
18:00

Aktobe (Kazakhstan)	0–1	(Estonia) Nõmme Kalju
	Report	Purje 72'

Central Stadium, Aktobe
Attendance: 10,870
Referee: Yuriy Mozharovsky (Ukraine)
9 July 2015
18:00

Nõmme Kalju (Estonia)	0–0	(Kazakhstan) Aktobe
	Report

A. Le Coq Arena, Tallinn (Note: Nõmme Kalju played their home matches at A. Le Coq Arena, Tallinn, instead of their regular stadium Hiiu Stadium, Tallinn.)
Attendance: 844
Referee: Danilo Grujić (Serbia)

Nõmme Kalju won 1–0 on aggregate.

2 July 2015
18:00

Dinamo Batumi (Georgia (country))	1–0	(Cyprus) Omonia
Gabedava 40'	Report

David Abashidze Stadium, Zestaponi (Note: Dinamo Batumi played their home match at David Abashidze Stadium, Zestaponi, instead of their temporary stadium Chele Arena, Kobuleti.)
Attendance: 3,589
Referee: Mitja Žganec (Slovenia)
9 July 2015
18:00

Omonia (Cyprus)	2–0	(Georgia (country)) Dinamo Batumi
Goulon 56'; Schembri 62'	Report

GSP Stadium, Nicosia
Attendance: 13,532
Referee: Fábio Veríssimo (Portugal)

Omonia won 2–1 on aggregate.

2 July 2015
17:00

Kruoja Pakruojis (Lithuania)	0–1	(Poland) Jagiellonia Białystok
	Report	Świderski 90+3'

Central Stadium, Šiauliai (Note: Kruoja Pakruojis played their home match at Central Stadium, Šiauliai, instead of their regular stadium City Stadium, Pakruojis.)
Attendance: 2,354
Referee: João Capela (Portugal)
9 July 2015
20:30

Jagiellonia Białystok (Poland)	8–0	(Lithuania) Kruoja Pakruojis
Gajos 3'; Świderski 8'; Tuszyński 18', 45+1', 49'; Frankowski 64', 75', 80'	Report

City Stadium, Białystok
Attendance: 13,724
Referee: Domagoj Vučkov (Croatia)

Jagiellonia Białystok won 9–0 on aggregate.

2 July 2015
15:30

Shirak (Armenia)	2–0	(Bosnia and Herzegovina) Zrinjski Mostar
Bougouhi 18', 67'	Report

City Stadium, Gyumri
Attendance: 2,774
Referee: Charalampos Kalogeropoulos (Greece)
9 July 2015
19:30

Zrinjski Mostar (Bosnia and Herzegovina)	2–1	(Armenia) Shirak
Mešanović 80' (pen.); Filipović 86'	Report	Bougouhi 90+8'

Stadion pod Bijelim Brijegom, Mostar
Attendance: 4,800
Referee: Zbynek Proske (Czech Republic)

Shirak won 3–2 on aggregate.

2 July 2015
20:45

Cork City (Republic of Ireland)	1–1	(Iceland) KR
Bennett 19'	Report	Hauksson 28'

Turners Cross, Cork
Attendance: 4,641
Referee: Mads-Kristoffer Kristoffersen (Denmark)
9 July 2015
21:15

KR (Iceland)	2–1 (a.e.t.)	(Republic of Ireland) Cork City
Pálmason 75'; Schoop 99'	Report	O'Sullivan 13'

KR-völlur, Reykjavík
Attendance: 1,145
Referee: Aleksandrs Anufrijevs (Latvia)

KR won 3–2 on aggregate.

2 July 2015
20:00

Go Ahead Eagles (Netherlands)	1–1	(Hungary) Ferencváros
Vriends 45+2'	Report	Gera 3'

JENS Vesting, Emmen (Note: Go Ahead Eagles played their home match at JENS Vesting, Emmen, instead of their regular stadium De Adelaarshorst, Deventer.)
Attendance: 6,248
Referee: Craig Pawson (England)
9 July 2015
20:30

Ferencváros (Hungary)	4–1	(Netherlands) Go Ahead Eagles
Gera 4'; Böde 20'; Busai 45'; Haraszti 89'	Report	Turuc 90+3'

Groupama Arena, Budapest
Attendance: 0 (Note: The Ferencváros v Go Ahead Eagles match was played behind closed doors due to UEFA punishment.)
Referee: Bojan Pandžić (Sweden)

Ferencváros won 5–2 on aggregate.

2 July 2015
19:00

Trakai (Lithuania)	3–0	(Faroe Islands) HB
Bychanok 20'; Arshakyan 61'; Solominas 86'	Report

Darius and Girėnas Stadium, Kaunas (Note: Trakai played their first qualifying round home match at Darius and Girėnas Stadium, Kaunas, instead of their regular stadium LFF Stadium, Vilnius.)
Attendance: 1,070
Referee: Lasha Silagava (Georgia)
9 July 2015
20:45

HB (Faroe Islands)	1–4	(Lithuania) Trakai
Hanssen 90'	Report	Arshakyan 30', 90+3' (pen.); Solomin 38'; Bychanok 83' (pen.)

Tórsvøllur, Tórshavn (Note: HB played their home match at Tórsvøllur, Tórshavn, instead of their regular stadium Gundadalur, Tórshavn.)
Attendance: 313
Referee: Sándor Andó-Szabó (Hungary)

Trakai won 7–1 on aggregate.

2 July 2015
17:30

Laçi (Albania)	1–1	(Azerbaijan) Inter Baku
Meto 20'	Report	Kvekveskiri 47'

Laçi Stadium, Laç
Attendance: 850
Referee: Carlos del Cerro Grande (Spain)
9 July 2015
18:00

Inter Baku (Azerbaijan)	0–0	(Albania) Laçi
	Report

Inter Arena, Baku
Attendance: 3,000
Referee: Alexandr Aliyev (Kazakhstan)

1–1 on aggregate; Inter Baku won on away goals.

2 July 2015
18:00

VPS (Finland)	2–2	(Sweden) AIK
Ćatović 45+3'; Seabrook 65'	Report	Bahoui 70', 83' (pen.)

Raatti Stadium, Oulu (Note: VPS played their home match at Raatti Stadium, Oulu, instead of their regular stadium Hietalahti Stadium, Vaasa.)
Attendance: 2,180
Referee: Ionuț Avram (Romania)
9 July 2015
19:00

AIK (Sweden)	4–0	(Finland) VPS
Goitom 14', 59'; Bangura 54'; Ofori 85'	Report

Friends Arena, Solna
Attendance: 8,430
Referee: Gunnar Jarl Jónsson (Iceland)

AIK won 6–2 on aggregate.

2 July 2015
20:45

UCD (Republic of Ireland)	1–0	(Luxembourg) F91 Dudelange
Swan 45+1'	Report

UCD Bowl, Dublin
Attendance: 1,075
Referee: Petur Reinert (Faroe Islands)
9 July 2015
18:00

F91 Dudelange (Luxembourg)	2–1	(Republic of Ireland) UCD
Pedro 43'; Nakache 45+3'	Report	Swan 17'

Stade Jos Nosbaum, Dudelange
Attendance: 1,245
Referee: Rahim Hasanov (Azerbaijan)

2–2 on aggregate; UCD won on away goals.

2 July 2015
20:00

Domžale (Slovenia)	0–1	(Serbia) Čukarički
	Report	Matić 43' (pen.)

Domžale Sports Park, Domžale
Attendance: 1,200
Referee: Bart Vertenten (Belgium)
9 July 2015
20:30

Čukarički (Serbia)	0–0	(Slovenia) Domžale
	Report

Stadion Čukarički, Belgrade
Attendance: 1,800
Referee: Nikola Popov (Bulgaria)

Čukarički won 1–0 on aggregate.

2 July 2015
21:00

Glentoran (Northern Ireland)	1–4	(Slovakia) Žilina
McMenamin 66'	Report	Jelić 13'; Paur 20'; Čmelík 59'; Kane 81' (o.g.)

The Oval, Belfast
Attendance: 1,676
Referee: Jari Järvinen (Finland)
9 July 2015
19:30

Žilina (Slovakia)	3–0	(Northern Ireland) Glentoran
Jelić 44', 55', 66'	Report

Štadión pod Dubňom, Žilina
Attendance: 2,897
Referee: Bardhyl Pashaj (Albania)

Žilina won 7–1 on aggregate.

2 July 2015
19:00

Strømsgodset (Norway)	3–1	(Albania) Partizani
Vilsvik 21', 73'; Ogunjimi 66'	Report	Fazliu 68'

Marienlyst Stadion, Drammen
Attendance: 3,273
Referee: Paul McLaughlin (Republic of Ireland)
9 July 2015
20:00

Partizani (Albania)	0–1	(Norway) Strømsgodset
	Report	Moen 90+5'

Qemal Stafa National Stadium, Tirana
Attendance: 4,200
Referee: Tobias Stieler (Germany)

Strømsgodset won 4–1 on aggregate.

2 July 2015
18:00

Neftçi (Azerbaijan)	2–2	(Montenegro) Mladost Podgorica
K. Gurbanov 36'; A. Abdullayev 55'	Report	Lagator 34'; Mirković 87'

Bakcell Arena, Baku (Note: Gabala played their home matches at Bakcell Arena, Baku, instead of their regular stadium City Stadium, Qabala, due to UEFA punishment.)
Attendance: 9,866
Referee: Ali Palabiyik (Turkey)
9 July 2015
20:30

Mladost Podgorica (Montenegro)	1–1	(Azerbaijan) Neftçi
Vuković 90+1'	Report	A. Abdullayev 71'

Stadion pod Goricom, Podgorica (Note: Mladost Podgorica played their home matches at Stadion pod Goricom, Podgorica, instead of their regular Stadion FK Mladost, Podgorica.)
Attendance: 4,000
Referee: Kevin Clancy (Scotland)

3–3 on aggregate; Mladost Podgorica won on away goals.

2 July 2015
20:00

Celje (Slovenia)	0–1	(Poland) Śląsk Wrocław
	Report	Pich 32'

Arena Petrol, Celje
Attendance: 4,900
Referee: Enea Jorgji (Albania)
9 July 2015
20:00

Śląsk Wrocław (Poland)	3–1	(Slovenia) Celje
Ostrowski 46'; Kiełb 56', 90'	Report	Firer 80'

Stadion Miejski, Wrocław
Attendance: 12,364
Referee: Anatoliy Zhabchenko (Ukraine)

Śląsk Wrocław won 4–1 on aggregate.

2 July 2015
20:30

La Fiorita (San Marino)	0–5	(Liechtenstein) Vaduz
	Report	Schürpf 5'; Sutter 26'; Pergl 41'; Abegglen 78'; Ciccone 90+2'

San Marino Stadium, Serravalle
Attendance: 649
Referee: Irfan Peljto (Bosnia and Herzegovina)
9 July 2015
19:45

Vaduz (Liechtenstein)	5–1	(San Marino) La Fiorita
Kamber 25', 33'; Schürpf 41'; Muntwiler 71'; Lang 84'	Report	Tommasi 74'

Rheinpark Stadion, Vaduz
Attendance: 727
Referee: Suren Baliyan (Armenia)

Vaduz won 10–1 on aggregate.

2 July 2015
20:45

Birkirkara (Malta)	0–0	(Armenia) Ulisses
	Report

Hibernians Ground, Paola (Note: Birkirkara played their first qualifying round home match at Hibernians Ground, Paola, and second qualifying round home match at National Stadium, Ta' Qali, instead of their regular stadium Infetti Ground, Birkirkara.)
Attendance: 1,895
Referee: Erez Papir (Israel)
9 July 2015
18:00

Ulisses (Armenia)	1–3	(Malta) Birkirkara
Morozov 71'	Report	Miccoli 21'; Mazzetti 44'; Fenech 80' (pen.)

Vazgen Sargsyan Republican Stadium, Yerevan
Attendance: 3,500
Referee: Nicolas Laforge (Belgium)

Birkirkara won 3–1 on aggregate.

2 July 2015
19:45

Airbus UK Broughton (Wales)	1–3	(Croatia) Lokomotiva Zagreb
Riley 28'	Report	Šovšić 48'; Marić 61'; Kolar 68'

Nantporth, Bangor (Note: Airbus UK Broughton played their home match at Nantporth, Bangor, instead of their regular stadium The Airfield, Broughton.)
Attendance: 543
Referee: Þóroddur Hjaltalín (Iceland)
9 July 2015
19:30

Lokomotiva Zagreb (Croatia)	2–2	(Wales) Airbus UK Broughton
Fiolić 65'; Šovšić 73'	Report	Budrys 46'; A. Jones 75'

Stadion Kranjčevićeva, Zagreb
Attendance: 650
Referee: Manuel Schüttengruber (Austria)

Lokomotiva Zagreb won 5–3 on aggregate.

2 July 2015
19:00

Botoșani (Romania)	1–1	(Georgia (country)) Tskhinvali
Ivanovici 21'	Report	Katcharava 46'

Stadionul Municipal, Botoșani
Attendance: 6,031
Referee: Lorenc Jemini (Albania)
9 July 2015
18:00

Tskhinvali (Georgia (country))	1–3	(Romania) Botoșani
Kilasonia 65' (pen.)	Report	Roman 6', 59'; Batin 68'

Mikheil Meskhi Stadium, Tbilisi
Attendance: 4,500
Referee: Nikolay Yordanov (Bulgaria)

Botoșani won 4–2 on aggregate.

2 July 2015
19:30

Europa (Gibraltar)	0–6	(Slovakia) Slovan Bratislava
	Report	Mészáros 5', 26', 31'; Simović 33'; Štefánik 41'; Priskin 90+3'

Victoria Stadium, Gibraltar
Attendance: 754
Referee: Ola Hobber Nilsen (Norway)
9 July 2015
19:00

Slovan Bratislava (Slovakia)	3–0	(Gibraltar) Europa
Gorosito 21'; Zreľák 35'; Vittek 67' (pen.)	Report

Štadión Pasienky, Bratislava
Attendance: 2,145
Referee: Alexandru Tean (Moldova)

Slovan Bratislava won 9–0 on aggregate.

== Second qualifying round ==
=== Summary ===
The first legs were played on 16 July, and the second legs were played on 21 and 23 July 2015.

Team 1	Agg.	Team 2	1st leg	2nd leg
Kukësi (Albania)	4–3	(Montenegro) Mladost Podgorica	0–1	4–2
Lokomotiva Zagreb (Croatia)	2–7	(Greece) PAOK	2–1	0–6
Slovan Bratislava (Slovakia)	6–1	(Republic of Ireland) UCD	1–0	5–1
Ferencváros (Hungary)	0–3	(Bosnia and Herzegovina) Željezničar	0–1	0–2
Vaduz (Liechtenstein)	5–1	(Estonia) Nõmme Kalju	3–1	2–0
Beroe Stara Zagora (Bulgaria)	0–1	(Denmark) Brøndby	0–1	0–0
KR (Iceland)	0–4	(Norway) Rosenborg	0–1	0–3
AIK (Sweden)	4–0	(Armenia) Shirak	2–0	2–0
Legia Warsaw (Poland)	4–0	(Romania) Botoșani	1–0	3–0
Dacia Chișinău (Moldova)	3–6	(Slovakia) Žilina	1–2	2–4
Shamrock Rovers (Republic of Ireland)	1–4	(Norway) Odd	0–2	1–2
Hapoel Be'er Sheva (Israel)	2–3	(Switzerland) Thun	1–1	1–2
Kairat (Kazakhstan)	4–2	(Armenia) Alashkert	3–0	1–2
Vojvodina (Serbia)	4–1	(Latvia) Spartaks Jūrmala	3–0	1–1
Jagiellonia Białystok (Poland)	0–1	(Cyprus) Omonia	0–0	0–1
Jelgava (Latvia)	1–2	(North Macedonia) Rabotnicki	1–0	0–2
Čukarički (Serbia)	1–2	(Azerbaijan) Gabala	1–0	0–2
Shakhtyor Soligorsk (Belarus)	0–3	(Austria) Wolfsberger AC	0–1	0–2
Trabzonspor (Turkey)	3–1	(Luxembourg) Differdange 03	1–0	2–1
Charleroi (Belgium)	9–2	(Israel) Beitar Jerusalem	5–1	4–1
Randers (Denmark)	0–1	(Sweden) IF Elfsborg	0–0	0–1 (a.e.t.)
Mladá Boleslav (Czech Republic)	2–2 (a)	(Norway) Strømsgodset	1–2	1–0
Cherno More (Bulgaria)	1–5	(Belarus) Dinamo Minsk	1–1	0–4
Rijeka (Croatia)	2–5	(Scotland) Aberdeen	0–3	2–2
West Ham United (England)	1–1 (5–3 p)	(Malta) Birkirkara	1–0	0–1 (a.e.t.)
Apollon Limassol (Cyprus)	4–0	(Lithuania) Trakai	4–0	0–0
Koper (Slovenia)	4–6	(Croatia) Hajduk Split	3–2	1–4
FH (Iceland)	3–4	(Azerbaijan) Inter Baku	1–2	2–2 (a.e.t.)
Inverness CT (Scotland)	0–1	(Romania) Astra Giurgiu	0–1	0–0
Spartak Trnava (Slovakia)	5–2	(Northern Ireland) Linfield	2–1	3–1
Copenhagen (Denmark)	5–1	(Wales) Newtown	2–0	3–1
Śląsk Wrocław (Poland)	0–2	(Sweden) IFK Göteborg	0–0	0–2
Skonto (Latvia)	4–11	(Hungary) Debrecen	2–2	2–9

=== Matches ===
16 July 2015
19:30

Kukësi (Albania)	0–1	(Montenegro) Mladost Podgorica
	Report	Lakić 52'

Qemal Stafa National Stadium, Tirana
Attendance: 2,500
Referee: Kristo Tohver (Estonia)
23 July 2015
20:30

Mladost Podgorica (Montenegro)	2–4	(Albania) Kukësi
Šćepanović 62'; Adžović 87'	Report	Moreira 13'; Pejić 19', 72'; Flores 32'

Stadion pod Goricom, Podgorica
Attendance: 4,500
Referee: Michael Tykgaard (Denmark)

Kukësi won 4–3 on aggregate.

16 July 2015
20:00

Lokomotiva Zagreb (Croatia)	2–1	(Greece) PAOK
Kolar 30'; Andrijašević 45+1'	Report	Mak 90+2'

Stadion Kranjčevićeva, Zagreb
Attendance: 1,000
Referee: Yuriy Mozharovsky (Ukraine)
23 July 2015
19:00

PAOK (Greece)	6–0	(Croatia) Lokomotiva Zagreb
Lucas 3'; Mak 7', 84'; Pelkas 14'; Kitsiou 34'; Andrijašević 59' (o.g.)	Report

Toumba Stadium, Thessaloniki
Attendance: 11,923
Referee: Carlos Xistra (Portugal)

PAOK won 7–2 on aggregate.

16 July 2015
20:15

Slovan Bratislava (Slovakia)	1–0	(Republic of Ireland) UCD
Zreľák 84'	Report

Štadión Pasienky, Bratislava
Attendance: 3,050
Referee: Lasha Silagava (Georgia)
23 July 2015
19:00

UCD (Republic of Ireland)	1–5	(Slovakia) Slovan Bratislava
Swan 57'	Report	Vittek 41', 90+1', 90+3'; Milinković 49'; Saláta 81'

UCD Bowl, Dublin
Attendance: 1,361
Referee: Ognjen Valjić (Bosnia and Herzegovina)

Slovan Bratislava won 6–1 on aggregate.

16 July 2015
20:30

Ferencváros (Hungary)	0–1	(Bosnia and Herzegovina) Željezničar
	Report	Beganović 90'

Groupama Arena, Budapest
Attendance: 8,853
Referee: Gunnar Jarl Jónsson (Iceland)
23 July 2015
18:00

Željezničar (Bosnia and Herzegovina)	2–0	(Hungary) Ferencváros
Kokot 23'; Đelmić 90+1'	Report

Asim Ferhatović Hase Stadium, Sarajevo
Attendance: 16,000
Referee: Orel Grinfeeld (Israel)

Željezničar won 3–0 on aggregate.

16 July 2015
19:45

Vaduz (Liechtenstein)	3–1	(Estonia) Nõmme Kalju
Ciccone 20'; Neumayr 53', 90+2'	Report	Wakui 86'

Rheinpark Stadion, Vaduz
Attendance: 912
Referee: Petur Reinert (Faroe Islands)
23 July 2015
18:00

Nõmme Kalju (Estonia)	0–2	(Liechtenstein) Vaduz
	Report	Caballero 59'; Aliji 74'

A. Le Coq Arena, Tallinn
Attendance: 1,030
Referee: Raymond Crangle (Northern Ireland)

Vaduz won 5–1 on aggregate.

16 July 2015
19:00

Beroe Stara Zagora (Bulgaria)	0–1	(Denmark) Brøndby
	Report	Albrechtsen 85'

Beroe Stadium, Stara Zagora
Attendance: 8,256
Referee: Antonio Damato (Italy)
23 July 2015
19:00

Brøndby (Denmark)	0–0	(Bulgaria) Beroe Stara Zagora
	Report

Brøndby Stadium, Brøndbyvester
Attendance: 9,550
Referee: Nicolas Rainville (France)

Brøndby won 1–0 on aggregate.

16 July 2015
21:15

KR (Iceland)	0–1	(Norway) Rosenborg
	Report	Helland 56' (pen.)

KR-völlur, Reykjavík
Attendance: 1,550
Referee: Ádám Farkas (Hungary)
23 July 2015
19:00

Rosenborg (Norway)	3–0	(Iceland) KR
Midtsjø 4'; Helland 7'; Søderlund 18'	Report

Lerkendal Stadion, Trondheim
Attendance: 6,371
Referee: Athanasios Giachos (Greece)

Rosenborg won 4–0 on aggregate.

16 July 2015
19:00

AIK (Sweden)	2–0	(Armenia) Shirak
Goitom 29', 83' (pen.)	Report

Tele2 Arena, Stockholm (Note: AIK played their second qualifying round home match at Tele2 Arena, Stockholm, instead of their regular stadium Friends Arena, Solna, which was booked for an AC/DC concert.)
Attendance: 7,315
Referee: Vladimir Vnuk (Slovakia)
23 July 2015
14:30

Shirak (Armenia)	0–2	(Sweden) AIK
	Report	Goitom 14'; Ishizaki 25'

City Stadium, Gyumri
Attendance: 2,820
Referee: Sándor Andó-Szabó (Hungary)

AIK won 4–0 on aggregate.

16 July 2015
21:00

Legia Warsaw (Poland)	1–0	(Romania) Botoșani
Duda 78'	Report

Polish Army Stadium, Warsaw
Attendance: 10,446
Referee: Ante Vučemilović-Šimunović Jr. (Croatia)
23 July 2015
19:00

Botoșani (Romania)	0–3	(Poland) Legia Warsaw
	Report	Guilherme 7'; Nikolić 38' (pen.); Prijović 84'

Stadionul Municipal, Botoșani
Attendance: 5,353
Referee: Alexandre Boucaut (Belgium)

Legia Warsaw won 4–0 on aggregate.

16 July 2015
18:00

Dacia Chișinău (Moldova)	1–2	(Slovakia) Žilina
Mihaliov 80'	Report	Jelić 53', 59'

Zimbru Stadium, Chișinău
Attendance: 3,800
Referee: Barış Şimşek (Turkey)
23 July 2015
19:30

Žilina (Slovakia)	4–2	(Moldova) Dacia Chișinău
Vavro 15'; Káčer 50'; Škvarka 62'; Paur 85'	Report	Cociuc 64'; Leucă 87'

Štadión pod Dubňom, Žilina
Attendance: 3,856
Referee: Sandro Schärer (Switzerland)

Žilina won 6–3 on aggregate.

16 July 2015
21:00

Shamrock Rovers (Republic of Ireland)	0–2	(Norway) Odd
	Report	Occéan 53' (pen.), 67'

Tallaght Stadium, Tallaght
Attendance: 2,900
Referee: Alain Bieri (Switzerland)
23 July 2015
19:00

Odd (Norway)	2–1	(Republic of Ireland) Shamrock Rovers
Halvorsen 72'; Hagen 86'	Report	G. Brennan 90'

Skagerak Arena, Skien
Attendance: 3,814
Referee: Ionuț Avram (Romania)

Odd won 4–1 on aggregate.

16 July 2015
19:00

Hapoel Be'er Sheva (Israel)	1–1	(Switzerland) Thun
Hoban 26'	Report	Frontino 87' (pen.)

Teddy Stadium, Jerusalem (Note: Hapoel Be'er Sheva played their home match at Teddy Stadium, Jerusalem, instead of their regular stadium Turner Stadium, Be'er Sheva.)
Attendance: 11,796
Referee: Bart Vertenten (Belgium)
23 July 2015
19:30

Thun (Switzerland)	2–1	(Israel) Hapoel Be'er Sheva
Ferreira 40', 72'	Report	Ogu 6'

Stockhorn Arena, Thun
Attendance: 4,017
Referee: Craig Pawson (England)

Thun won 3–2 on aggregate.

16 July 2015
16:45

Kairat (Kazakhstan)	3–0	(Armenia) Alashkert
Islamkhan 14' (pen.); Gohou 55'; Despotović 69'	Report

Central Stadium, Almaty
Attendance: 22,100
Referee: Sergey Ivanov (Russia)
23 July 2015
17:00

Alashkert (Armenia)	2–1	(Kazakhstan) Kairat
Arakelyan 28'; Héber 90+3'	Report	Gohou 45+2'

Vazgen Sargsyan Republican Stadium, Yerevan
Attendance: 2,500
Referee: João Capela (Portugal)

Kairat won 4–2 on aggregate.

16 July 2015
20:30

Vojvodina (Serbia)	3–0	(Latvia) Spartaks Jūrmala
Stanisavljević 6'; Mrdaković 16'; Mickevičs 88' (o.g.)	Report

Karađorđe Stadium, Novi Sad
Attendance: 9,000
Referee: Benoît Millot (France)
23 July 2015
18:00

Spartaks Jūrmala (Latvia)	1–1	(Serbia) Vojvodina
Vivacqua 90+3'	Report	Kordić 86'

Olympic Sports Center of Zemgale, Jelgava
Attendance: 650
Referee: Richard Liesveld (Netherlands)

Vojvodina won 4–1 on aggregate.

16 July 2015
20:30

Jagiellonia Białystok (Poland)	0–0	(Cyprus) Omonia
	Report

City Stadium, Białystok
Attendance: 16,067
Referee: Bojan Pandžić (Sweden)
23 July 2015
18:00

Omonia (Cyprus)	1–0	(Poland) Jagiellonia Białystok
Sheridan 8'	Report

GSP Stadium, Nicosia
Attendance: 17,481
Referee: Danilo Grujić (Serbia)

Omonia won 1–0 on aggregate.

16 July 2015
17:30

Jelgava (Latvia)	1–0	(North Macedonia) Rabotnicki
Kļuškins 87'	Report

Olympic Sports Center of Zemgale, Jelgava
Attendance: 1,510
Referee: Tore Hansen (Norway)
23 July 2015
20:00

Rabotnicki (North Macedonia)	2–0	(Latvia) Jelgava
Ilijoski 6'; Sahiti 17'	Report

Philip II Arena, Skopje
Attendance: 2,300
Referee: István Kovács (Romania)

Rabotnicki won 2–1 on aggregate.

16 July 2015
20:30

Čukarički (Serbia)	1–0	(Azerbaijan) Gabala
Stojiljković 53' (pen.)	Report

Stadion Čukarički, Belgrade
Attendance: 3,550
Referee: Radu Petrescu (Romania)
23 July 2015
18:00

Gabala (Azerbaijan)	2–0	(Serbia) Čukarički
Zenjov 39', 53'	Report

Bakcell Arena, Baku
Attendance: 8,500
Referee: Radek Příhoda (Czech Republic)

Gabala won 2–1 on aggregate.

16 July 2015
18:30

Shakhtyor Soligorsk (Belarus)	0–1	(Austria) Wolfsberger AC
	Report	Ynclán 62'

Stroitel Stadium, Salihorsk
Attendance: 2,500
Referee: Ilias Spathas (Greece)
23 July 2015
20:30

Wolfsberger AC (Austria)	2–0	(Belarus) Shakhtyor Soligorsk
Sollbauer 19'; Hellquist 90'	Report

Wörthersee Stadion, Klagenfurt (Note: Wolfsberger AC played their home matches at Wörthersee Stadion, Klagenfurt, instead of their regular stadium Lavanttal-Arena, Wolfsberg.)
Attendance: 6,400
Referee: Dimitar Meckarovski (Macedonia)

Wolfsberger AC won 3–0 on aggregate.

16 July 2015
20:00

Trabzonspor (Turkey)	1–0	(Luxembourg) Differdange 03
Ekici 44'	Report

Hüseyin Avni Aker Stadium, Trabzon
Attendance: 9,254
Referee: Ivaylo Stoyanov (Bulgaria)
23 July 2015
19:00

Differdange 03 (Luxembourg)	1–2	(Turkey) Trabzonspor
Er Rafik 81'	Report	Dursun 19'; Aydoğdu 90+3'

Stade Josy Barthel, Luxembourg City (Note: Differdange 03 played their second qualifying round home match at Stade Josy Barthel, Luxembourg City, instead of their regular stadium Stade Municipal, Differdange.)
Attendance: 3,455
Referee: Marco Borg (Malta)

Trabzonspor won 3–1 on aggregate.

16 July 2015
19:30

Charleroi (Belgium)	5–1	(Israel) Beitar Jerusalem
Pollet 10', 68'; Kebano 47', 90+3'; Stevance 88'	Report	Gabay 35'

Stade du Pays de Charleroi, Charleroi
Attendance: 10,175
Referee: Lee Probert (England)
23 July 2015
19:00

Beitar Jerusalem (Israel)	1–4	(Belgium) Charleroi
Atzili 16'	Report	Kebano 43'; Sağlık 53'; Ndongala 76'; Stevance 90+2'

Teddy Stadium, Jerusalem
Attendance: 6,500
Referee: Stephan Klossner (Switzerland)

Charleroi won 9–2 on aggregate.

16 July 2015
18:00

Randers (Denmark)	0–0	(Sweden) IF Elfsborg
	Report

AutoC Park Randers, Randers
Attendance: 3,151
Referee: Ali Palabıyık (Turkey)
21 July 2015
17:55

IF Elfsborg (Sweden)	1–0 (a.e.t.)	(Denmark) Randers
Lundevall 94'	Report

Borås Arena, Borås
Attendance: 5,197
Referee: Andreas Pappas (Greece)

IF Elfsborg won 1–0 on aggregate.

16 July 2015
19:00

Mladá Boleslav (Czech Republic)	1–2	(Norway) Strømsgodset
Bartl 39'	Report	Sørum 44'; Jradi 85'

Městský stadion, Mladá Boleslav
Attendance: 4,756
Referee: John Beaton (Scotland)
23 July 2015
19:00

Strømsgodset (Norway)	0–1	(Czech Republic) Mladá Boleslav
	Report	Čermák 31'

Marienlyst Stadion, Drammen
Attendance: 4,371
Referee: Aleksei Nikolaev (Russia)

2–2 on aggregate; Strømsgodset won on away goals.

16 July 2015
19:00

Cherno More (Bulgaria)	1–1	(Belarus) Dinamo Minsk
Coureur 11'	Report	Palitsevich 72'

Ludogorets Arena, Razgrad (Note: Cherno More Varna played their home match at Ludogorets Arena, Razgrad, instead of their regular stadium Ticha Stadium, Varna.)
Attendance: 3,650
Referee: Tobias Stieler (Germany)
23 July 2015
17:00

Dinamo Minsk (Belarus)	4–0	(Bulgaria) Cherno More
Karytska 41'; Adamović 58'; Bećiraj 86', 90+2'	Report

Traktor Stadium, Minsk
Attendance: 2,616
Referee: Anatoliy Zhabchenko (Ukraine)

Dinamo Minsk won 5–1 on aggregate.

16 July 2015
21:00

Rijeka (Croatia)	0–3	(Scotland) Aberdeen
	Report	Considine 38'; Pawlett 52'; McLean 75'

Stadion Kantrida, Rijeka
Attendance: 9,000
Referee: Amaury Delerue (France)
23 July 2015
20:45

Aberdeen (Scotland)	2–2	(Croatia) Rijeka
McGinn 64'; Hayes 72'	Report	Tomasov 58'; Kvržić 63'

Pittodrie Stadium, Aberdeen
Attendance: 15,803
Referee: Marco Guida (Italy)

Aberdeen won 5–2 on aggregate.

16 July 2015
20:45

West Ham United (England)	1–0	(Malta) Birkirkara
Tomkins 90'	Report

Boleyn Ground, London
Attendance: 33,048
Referee: Markus Hameter (Austria)
23 July 2015
20:45

Birkirkara (Malta)	1–0 (a.e.t.)	(England) West Ham United
Miccoli 15'	Report
Penalties
Fenech (penalty scored); Plut (penalty scored); Vukanac (penalty missed); Agius (penalty scored)	3–5	(penalty scored) Noble; (penalty scored) Zárate; (penalty scored) Cresswell; (penalty scored) O'Brien; (penalty scored) Poyet

National Stadium, Ta' Qali
Attendance: 14,571
Referee: Enea Jorgji (Albania)

1–1 on aggregate; West Ham United won 5–3 on penalties.

16 July 2015
19:00

Apollon Limassol (Cyprus)	4–0	(Lithuania) Trakai
Kolokoudias 21', 64' (pen.); Stojanović 52'; Farley 87'	Report

Antonis Papadopoulos Stadium, Larnaca
Attendance: 3,720
Referee: Nikola Dabanović (Montenegro)
23 July 2015
19:00

Trakai (Lithuania)	0–0	(Cyprus) Apollon Limassol
	Report

LFF Stadium, Vilnius
Attendance: 930
Referee: Padraig Sutton (Republic of Ireland)

Apollon Limassol won 4–0 on aggregate.

16 July 2015
19:00

Koper (Slovenia)	3–2	(Croatia) Hajduk Split
Halilović 7'; Rahmanović 17', 41'	Report	Milović 29'; Nižić 90'

Bonifika Stadium, Koper
Attendance: 2,590
Referee: Bartosz Frankowski (Poland)
23 July 2015
19:00

Hajduk Split (Croatia)	4–1	(Slovenia) Koper
Kiš 2'; Jefferson 40'; Caktaš 62'; Maglica 69'	Report	Palčič 45+2'

Stadion Poljud, Split
Attendance: 22,800
Referee: Marco Fritz (Germany)

Hajduk Split won 6–4 on aggregate.

16 July 2015
21:15

FH (Iceland)	1–2	(Azerbaijan) Inter Baku
Guðnason 39' (pen.)	Report	Kvekveskiri 54' (pen.); Martins 61'

Kaplakrikavöllur, Hafnarfjörður
Attendance: 1,020
Referee: Michael Lerjéus (Sweden)
23 July 2015
18:00

Inter Baku (Azerbaijan)	2–2 (a.e.t.)	(Iceland) FH
Huseynov 45+1'; Aliyev 91'	Report	Valdimarsson 47'; K. F. Finnbogason 52'

Inter Arena, Baku
Attendance: 3,500
Referee: Yaroslav Kozyk (Ukraine)

Inter Baku won 4–3 on aggregate.

16 July 2015
20:45

Inverness CT (Scotland)	0–1	(Romania) Astra Giurgiu
	Report	Budescu 24'

Caledonian Stadium, Inverness
Attendance: 5,534
Referee: Ken Henry Johnsen (Norway)
23 July 2015
20:00

Astra Giurgiu (Romania)	0–0	(Scotland) Inverness CT
	Report

Stadionul Marin Anastasovici, Giurgiu
Attendance: 3,067
Referee: Artyom Kuchin (Kazakhstan)

Astra Giurgiu won 1–0 on aggregate.

16 July 2015
20:05

Spartak Trnava (Slovakia)	2–1	(Northern Ireland) Linfield
Sabo 16' (pen.); Mikovič 35'	Report	Kee 21'

Štadión FC ViOn, Zlaté Moravce
Attendance: 3,220
Referee: Mikhail Vilkov (Russia)
23 July 2015
20:45

Linfield (Northern Ireland)	1–3	(Slovakia) Spartak Trnava
Lowry 34'	Report	Sabo 54', 84'; Vojtuš 60'

Windsor Park, Belfast
Attendance: 3,001
Referee: Laurent Kopriwa (Luxembourg)

Spartak Trnava won 5–2 on aggregate.

16 July 2015
19:45

Copenhagen (Denmark)	2–0	(Wales) Newtown
Verbič 3'; Kusk 74'	Report

Telia Parken, Copenhagen
Attendance: 8,104
Referee: Mete Kalkavan (Turkey)
23 July 2015
19:45

Newtown (Wales)	1–3	(Denmark) Copenhagen
Goodwin 70'	Report	Pourié 28', 51'; N. Jørgensen 40' (pen.)

Latham Park, Newtown
Attendance: 1,400
Referee: Stanislav Todorov (Bulgaria)

Copenhagen won 5–1 on aggregate.

16 July 2015
20:30

Śląsk Wrocław (Poland)	0–0	(Sweden) IFK Göteborg
	Report

Stadion Miejski, Wrocław
Attendance: 16,978
Referee: Jesús Gil Manzano (Spain)
23 July 2015
19:00

IFK Göteborg (Sweden)	2–0	(Poland) Śląsk Wrocław
Engvall 55'; Boman 59'	Report

Gamla Ullevi, Gothenburg
Attendance: 10,823
Referee: Serdar Gözübüyük (Netherlands)

IFK Göteborg won 2–0 on aggregate.

16 July 2015
18:00

Skonto (Latvia)	2–2	(Hungary) Debrecen
Karašausks 27', 47'	Report	Tisza 9'; Castillion 72'

Skonto Stadium, Riga
Attendance: 2,200
Referee: Mads-Kristoffer Kristoffersen (Denmark)
23 July 2015
17:00

Debrecen (Hungary)	9–2	(Latvia) Skonto
Tisza 7', 45+2'; Balogh 12'; Sidibe 29', 31'; Brković 51'; Szakály 54' (pen.); Bódi 58'; Castillion 70'	Report	Gutkovskis 59'; Rode 65'

Nagyerdei Stadion, Debrecen
Attendance: 8,532
Referee: Vitali Meshkov (Russia)

Debrecen won 11–4 on aggregate.
