= Icelandic football clubs in European competitions =

== European Cup / UEFA Champions League ==
Season	Team	Round	Opponent	Home	Away	Aggregate
1955–56	Did not enter					
1956–57	Did not enter					
1957–58	Did not enter					
1958–59	Did not enter					
1959–60	Did not enter					
1960–61	Did not enter					
1961–62	Did not enter					
1962–63	Did not enter					
1963–64	Did not enter					
1964–65	KR	Preliminary round	(England) Liverpool	0–5	1–6	1–11
1965–66	Keflavík	Preliminary round	(Hungary) Ferencváros	1–4	1–9	2–13
1966–67	KR	First round	(France) Nantes	2–3	2–5	4–8
1967–68	Valur	First round	(Luxembourg) Jeunesse Esch	1–1	3–3	4–4 (a)
1967–68	Valur	Second round	(Hungary) Vasas	1–5	0–6	1–11
1968–69	Valur	First round	(Portugal) Benfica	0–0	1–8	1–8
1969–70	KR	First round	(Netherlands) Feyenoord	2–12	0–4	2–16
1970–71	Keflavík	First round	(England) Everton	0–3	2–6	2–9
1971–72	ÍA	First round	(Malta) Sliema Wanderers	0–4	0–0	0–4
1972–73	Keflavík	First round	(Spain) Real Madrid	0–1	0–3	0–4
1973–74	Fram	First round	(Switzerland) Basel	2–6	0–5	2–11
1974–75	Keflavík	First round	(Socialist Federal Republic of Yugoslavia) Hajduk Split	0–2	1–7	1–9
1975–76	ÍA	First round	(Cyprus) Omonia	4–0	1–2	5–2
1975–76	ÍA	Second round	(Soviet Union) Dynamo Kyiv	0–2	0–3	0–5
1976–77	ÍA	First round	(Turkey) Trabzonspor	1–3	2–3	3–6
1977–78	Valur	First round	(Northern Ireland) Glentoran	1–0	0–2	1–2
1978–79	ÍA	First round	(West Germany) Köln	1–1	1–4	2–5
1979–80	Valur	First round	(West Germany) Hamburg	0–3	1–2	1–5
1980–81	ÍBV	First round	(Czechoslovakia) Baník Ostrava	1–1	0–1	1–2
1981–82	Valur	First round	(England) Aston Villa	0–5	0–2	0–7
1982–83	Víkingur Reykjavík	First round	(Spain) Real Sociedad	0–1	2–3	2–4
1983–84	Víkingur Reykjavík	First round	(Hungary) Rába ETO Győr	0–2	1–2	1–4
1984–85	ÍA	First round	(Belgium) Beveren	2–2	0–5	2–7
1985-86	ÍA	First round	(Scotland) Aberdeen	1–3	1–4	2–7
1986–87	Valur	First round	(Italy) Juventus	0–4	0–7	0–11
1987–88	Fram	First round	(Czechoslovakia) Sparta Prague	0–2	0–8	0–10
1988–89	Valur	First round	(France) Monaco	1–0	0–2	1–2
1989–90	Fram	First round	(Romania) Steaua București	0–1	0–4	0–5
1990–91	KA	First round	(Bulgaria) CSKA Sofia	1–0	0–3	1–3
1991–92	Fram	First round	(Greece) Panathinaikos	2–2	0–0	2–2 (a)
1992–93	Víkingur Reykjavík	First round	(Russia) CSKA Moscow	0–1	2–4	2–5
1993–94	ÍA	Preliminary round	(Albania) Partizani	3–0	0–0	3–0
1993–94	ÍA	First round	(Netherlands) Feyenoord	1–0	0–3	1–3
1994–95	Icelandic champions entered the UEFA Cup instead of the Champions League.					
1995–96	Icelandic champions entered the UEFA Cup instead of the Champions League.					
1996–97	Icelandic champions entered the UEFA Cup instead of the Champions League.					
1997–98	ÍA	First qualifying round	(Slovakia) Košice	0–3	0–1	0–4
1998–99	ÍBV	First qualifying round	(Federal Republic of Yugoslavia) Obilić	0–2	1–2	1–4
1999–00	ÍBV	First qualifying round	(Albania) Tirana	1–0	2–1	3–1
1999–00	ÍBV	Second qualifying round	(Hungary) MTK Hungária	0–2	1–3	1–5
2000–01	KR	First qualifying round	(Malta) Birkirkara	4–1	2–1	6–2
2000–01	KR	Second qualifying round	(Denmark) Brøndby	0–0	1–3	1–3
2001–02	KR	First qualifying round	(Albania) Vllaznia	2–1	0–1	2–2 (a)
2002–03	ÍA	First qualifying round	(Bosnia and Herzegovina) Željezničar	0–1	0–3	0–4
2003–04	KR	First qualifying round	(Armenia) Pyunik	1–1	0–1	1–2
2004–05	KR	First qualifying round	(Republic of Ireland) Shelbourne	2–2	0–0	2–2 (a)
2005–06	FH	First qualifying round	(Azerbaijan) Neftçi	1–2	0–2	1–4
2006–07	FH	First qualifying round	(Estonia) TVMK	1–1	3–2	4–2
2006–07	FH	Second qualifying round	(Poland) Legia Warsaw	0–1	0–2	0–3
2007–08	FH	First qualifying round	(Faroe Islands) HB	4–1	0–0	4–1
2007–08	FH	Second qualifying round	(Belarus) BATE Borisov	1–3	1–1	2–4
2008–09	Valur	First qualifying round	(Belarus) BATE Borisov	0–1	0–2	0–3
2009–10	FH	Second qualifying round	(Kazakhstan) Aktobe	0–4	0–2	0–6
2010–11	FH	Second qualifying round	(Belarus) BATE Borisov	0–1	1–5	1–6
2011–12	Breiðablik	Second qualifying round	(Norway) Rosenborg	2–0	0–5	2–5
2012–13	KR	Second qualifying round	(Finland) HJK Helsinki	1–2	0–7	1–9
2013–14	FH	Second qualifying round	(Lithuania) Ekranas	1–0	2–1	3–1
2013–14	FH	Third qualifying round	Austria Wien	0–0	0–1	0–1
2014–15	KR	Second qualifying round	(Scotland) Celtic	0–1	0–4	0–5
2015–16	Stjarnan	Second qualifying round	(Scotland) Celtic	1–4	0–2	1–6
2016–17	FH	Second qualifying round	(Republic of Ireland) Dundalk	1–1	2–2	3–3 (a)
2017–18	FH	Second qualifying round	(Faroe Islands) Víkingur Gøta	1–1	2–0	3–1
2017–18	FH	Third qualifying round	(Slovenia) Maribor	0–1	0–1	0–2
2018–19	Valur	First qualifying round	(Norway) Rosenborg	1–0	1–3	2–3
2019–20	Valur	First qualifying round	(Slovenia) Maribor	0–3	0–2	0–5
2020–21	KR	First qualifying round	(Scotland) Celtic		0–6	0–6
2021–22	Valur	First qualifying round	(Croatia) GNK Dinamo Zagreb	0–2	2–3	2–5
2022–23	Víkingur Reykjavík	Preliminary round	(Estonia) FCI Levadia	6–1		6–1
2022–23	Víkingur Reykjavík	Preliminary round	(Andorra) Inter Club d'Escaldes	1–0		1–0
2022–23	Víkingur Reykjavík	First qualifying round	(Sweden) Malmö FF	3–3	2–3	5–6
2023–24	Breiðablik	Preliminary round	(San Marino) Tre Penne	7–1		7–1
2023–24	Breiðablik	Preliminary round	(Montenegro) Budućnost Podgorica	5–0		5–0
2023–24	Breiðablik	First qualifying round	(Republic of Ireland) Shamrock Rovers	2–1	1–0	3–1
2023–24	Breiðablik	Second qualifying round	(Denmark) Copenhagen	0–2	3–6	3–8
2024–25	Víkingur Reykjavík	First qualifying round	(Republic of Ireland) Shamrock Rovers	0–0	1–2	1–2
2025–26	Breiðablik	First qualifying round	(Albania) Egnatia	5–0	0–1	5–1
2025–26	Breiðablik	Second qualifying round	(Poland) Lech Poznań	0–1	1–7	1–8
2026–27	Víkingur Reykjavík	First qualifying round	(Hungary) ETO Győri	1–0	2–2	3–2
2026–27	Víkingur Reykjavík	Second qualifying round	(Israel) Hapoel Be'er Sheva	2–1	0–2	2–3

== UEFA Europa League ==
Season	Team	Round	Opponent	Home	Away	Aggregate
2009–10	Keflavík	First qualifying round	(Malta) Valletta	2–2	0–3	2–5
2009–10	Fram	First qualifying round	(Wales) The New Saints	2–1	2–1	4–2
2009–10	Fram	Second qualifying round	(Czech Republic) Sigma Olomouc	0–2	1–1	1–3
2009–10	KR	Second qualifying round	(Greece) AEL	2–0	1–1	3–1
2009–10	KR	Third qualifying round	(Switzerland) Basel	2–2	1–3	3–5
2010–11	Fylkir	First qualifying round	(Belarus) Torpedo Zhodino	1–3	0–3	1–6
2010–11	KR	First qualifying round	(Northern Ireland) Glentoran	3–0	2–2	5–2
2010–11	KR	Second qualifying round	(Ukraine) Karpaty Lviv	0–3	2–3	2–6
2010–11	Breiðablik	Second qualifying round	(Scotland) Motherwell	2–0	1–1	0–2
2011–12	ÍBV	First qualifying round	(Republic of Ireland) St Patrick's Athletic	1–0	0–2	1–2
2011–12	KR	First qualifying round	(Faroe Islands) ÍF	5–1	3–1	8–2
2011–12	KR	Second qualifying round	(Slovakia) Žilina	3–0	0–2	3–2
2011–12	KR	Third qualifying round	(Georgia (country)) Dinamo Tbilisi	1–4	0–2	1–6
2011–12	FH	Second qualifying round	(Portugal) Nacional	1–1	0–2	1–3
2012–13	ÍBV	First qualifying round	(Republic of Ireland) St Patrick's Athletic	2–1 (a.e.t.)	0–1	2–2 (a)
2012–13	Þór	First qualifying round	(Republic of Ireland) Bohemian	5–1	0–0	5–1
2012–13	Þór	Second qualifying round	(Czech Republic) Mladá Boleslav	0–1	0–3	0–4
2012–13	FH	First qualifying round	(Liechtenstein) Eschen/Mauren	2–1	1–0	3–1
2012–13	FH	Second qualifying round	(Sweden) AIK	0–1	1–1	1–2
2013–14	KR	First qualifying round	(Northern Ireland) Glentoran	0–0	3–0	3–0
2013–14	KR	Second qualifying round	(Belgium) Standard Liège	1–3	1–3	2–6
2013–14	Breiðablik	First qualifying round	(Andorra) Santa Coloma	4–0	0–0	4–0
2013–14	Breiðablik	Second qualifying round	(Austria) Sturm Graz	0–0	1–0	1–0
2013–14	Breiðablik	Third qualifying round	(Kazakhstan) Aktobe	1–0 (a.e.t.)	0–1	1–1 (1–2 p)
2013–14	ÍBV	First qualifying round	(Faroe Islands) HB	1–1	1–0	2–1
2013–14	ÍBV	Second qualifying round	(Serbia) Red Star Belgrade	0–0	0–2	0–2
2013–14	FH	Play-off round	(Belgium) Genk	0–2	2–5	2–7
2014–15	Fram	First qualifying round	(Estonia) Nõmme Kalju	0–1	2–2	2–3
2014–15	Stjarnan	First qualifying round	(Wales) Bangor City	4–0	4–0	8–0
2014–15	Stjarnan	Second qualifying round	(Scotland) Motherwell	3–2 (a.e.t.)	2–2	5–4
2014–15	Stjarnan	Third qualifying round	(Poland) Lech Poznań	1–0	0–0	1–0
2014–15	Stjarnan	Play-off round	(Italy) Inter Milan	0–3	0–6	0–9
2014–15	FH	First qualifying round	(Northern Ireland) Glenavon	3–0	3–2	6–2
2014–15	FH	Second qualifying round	(Belarus) Neman Grodno	2–0	1–1	3–1
2014–15	FH	Third qualifying round	(Sweden) IF Elfsborg	2–1	1–4	3–5
2015–16	Víkingur Reykjavík	First qualifying round	(Slovenia) Koper	0–1	2–2	2–3
2015–16	FH	First qualifying round	(Finland) SJK	1–0	1–0	2–0
2015–16	FH	Second qualifying round	(Azerbaijan) Inter Baku	1–2	2–2 (a.e.t.)	3–4
2015–16	KR	First qualifying round	(Republic of Ireland) Cork City	2–1 (a.e.t.)	1–1	3–2
2015–16	KR	Second qualifying round	(Norway) Rosenborg	0–1	0–3	0–4
2016–17	Valur	First qualifying round	(Denmark) Brøndby	1–4	0–6	1–10
2016–17	Breiðablik	First qualifying round	(Latvia) Jelgava	2–3	2–2	4–5
2016–17	KR	First qualifying round	(Northern Ireland) Glenavon	2–1	6–0	8–1
2016–17	KR	Second qualifying round	(Switzerland) Grasshopper	3–3	1–2	4–5
2017–18	Stjarnan	First qualifying round	(Republic of Ireland) Shamrock Rovers	0–1	0–1	0–2
2017–18	Valur	First qualifying round	(Latvia) Ventspils	1–0	0–0	1–0
2017–18	Valur	Second qualifying round	(Slovenia) Domžale	1–2	2–3	3–5
2017–18	KR	First qualifying round	(Finland) SJK	0–0	2–0	2–0
2017–18	KR	Second qualifying round	(Israel) Maccabi Tel Aviv	0–2	1–3	1–5
2017–18	FH	Play-off round	(Portugal) Braga	1–2	2–3	3–5
2018–19	ÍBV	First qualifying round	(Norway) Sarpsborg 08	0–4	0–2	0–6
2018–19	Stjarnan	First qualifying round	(Estonia) Nõmme Kalju	3–0	0–1	3–1
2018–19	Stjarnan	Second qualifying round	(Denmark) Copenhagen	0–2	0–5	0–7
2018–19	FH	First qualifying round	(Finland) Lahti	0–0	3–0	3–0
2018–19	FH	Second qualifying round	(Israel) Hapoel Haifa	0–2	1–3	1–5
2018–19	Valur	Second qualifying round	(Andorra) Santa Coloma	3–0	0–1	3–1
2018–19	Valur	Third qualifying round	(Moldova) Sheriff Tiraspol	2–1	0–1	2–2 (a)
2019–20	Breiðablik	First qualifying round	(Liechtenstein) Vaduz	0–0	1–2	1–2
2019–20	KR	First qualifying round	(Norway) Molde	0–0	1–7	1–7
2019–20	Stjarnan	First qualifying round	(Estonia) FCI Levadia	2–1	2–3 (a.e.t.)	4–4 (a)
2019–20	Stjarnan	Second qualifying round	(Spain) Espanyol	1–3	0–4	1–7
2019–20	Valur	Second qualifying round	(Bulgaria) Ludogorets Razgrad	1–1	0–4	1–5
2020–21	Víkingur Reykjavík	First qualifying round	(Slovenia) Olimpija Ljubljana	—	1–2	1–2
2020–21	Breiðablik	First qualifying round	(Norway) Rosenborg	—	2–4	2–4
2020–21	FH	First qualifying round	(Slovakia) DAC Dunajská Streda	0–2	—	0–2
2020–21	KR	Second qualifying round	(Estonia) Flora	—	1–2	1–2
2023–24	Breiðablik	Third qualifying round	(Bosnia and Herzegovina) Zrinjski Mostar	1–0	2–6	3–6
2025–26	Breiðablik	Third qualifying round	(Bosnia and Herzegovina) Zrinjski Mostar	1–2	1–1	2–3
2026–27	Vestri	First qualifying round	(Azerbaijan) Qarabağ	0–3	0–3	0–6
2026–27	Víkingur Reykjavík	Third qualifying round	(Switzerland) Thun	3–2	0–3	3–5

== UEFA Conference League ==
Season	Team	Round	Opponent	Home	Away	Aggregate
2021–22	Stjarnan	First qualifying round	(Republic of Ireland) Bohemians	1–1	0–3	1–4
2021–22	FH	First qualifying round	(Republic of Ireland) Sligo Rovers	1–0	2–1	3–1
2021–22	FH	Second qualifying round	(Norway) Rosenborg	0–2	1–4	1–6
2021–22	Breiðablik	First qualifying round	(Luxembourg) Racing Union	2–0	3–2	5–2
2021–22	Breiðablik	Second qualifying round	Austria Wien	2–1	1–1	3–2
2021–22	Breiðablik	Third qualifying round	(Scotland) Aberdeen	2–3	1–2	3–5
2021–22	Valur	Second qualifying round	(Norway) Bodø/Glimt	0–3	0–3	0–6
2022–23	KR	First qualifying round	(Poland) Pogoń Szczecin	1–0	1–4	2–4
2022–23	Breiðablik	First qualifying round	(Andorra) UE Santa Coloma	4–1	1–0	5–1
2022–23	Breiðablik	Second qualifying round	(Montenegro) Budućnost Podgorica	2–0	1–2	3–2
2022–23	Breiðablik	Third qualifying round	(Turkey) İstanbul Başakşehir	1–3	0–3	1–6
2022–23	Víkingur Reykjavík	Second qualifying round	(Wales) The New Saints	2–0	0–0	2–0
2022–23	Víkingur Reykjavík	Third qualifying round	(Poland) Lech Poznań	1–0	1–4 (a.e.t.)	2–4
2023–24	Víkingur Reykjavík	First qualifying round	(Latvia) Riga	1–0	0–2	1–2
2023–24	KA	First qualifying round	(Wales) Connah's Quay Nomads	2–0	2–0	4–0
2023–24	KA	Second qualifying round	(Republic of Ireland) Dundalk	3–1	2–2	5–3
2023–24	KA	Third qualifying round	(Belgium) Club Brugge	1–5	1–5	2–10
2023–24	Breiðablik	Play-off qualifying round	(Montenegro) Struga	1–0	1–0	2–0
2023–24	Breiðablik	Group stage	(Israel) Maccabi Tel Aviv	1–2	2–3	4th place
2023–24	Breiðablik	Group stage	(Ukraine) Zorya Luhansk	0–1	0–4	4th place
2023–24	Breiðablik	Group stage	(Belgium) Gent	2–3	0–5	4th place
2024–25	Valur	First qualifying round	(Albania) Vllaznia	2–2	4–0	6–2
2024–25	Valur	Second qualifying round	(Scotland) St Mirren	0–0	1–4	1–4
2024–25	Stjarnan	First qualifying round	(Northern Ireland) Linfield	2–0	2–3	4–3
2024–25	Stjarnan	Second qualifying round	(Estonia) Paide Linnameeskond	2–1	0–4	2–5
2024–25	Breiðablik	First qualifying round	(North Macedonia) Tikvesh	3–1	2–3	5–4
2024–25	Breiðablik	Second qualifying round	(Kosovo) Drita	1–2	0–1	1–3
2024–25	Víkingur Reykjavík	Second qualifying round	(Albania) Egnatia	0–1	2–0	2–1
2024–25	Víkingur Reykjavík	Third qualifying round	(Estonia) Flora	1–1	2–1	3–2
2024–25	Víkingur Reykjavík	Play-off round	(Andorra) UE Santa Coloma	5–0	0–0	5–0
2024–25	Víkingur Reykjavík	League phase	(Cyprus) Omonia	—	0–4	19th out of 36
2024–25	Víkingur Reykjavík	League phase	(Belgium) Cercle Brugge	3–1	—	19th out of 36
2024–25	Víkingur Reykjavík	League phase	(Bosnia and Herzegovina) Borac Banja Luka	2–0	—	19th out of 36
2024–25	Víkingur Reykjavík	League phase	(Armenia) Noah	—	0–0	19th out of 36
2024–25	Víkingur Reykjavík	League phase	(Sweden) Djurgårdens IF	1–2	—	19th out of 36
2024–25	Víkingur Reykjavík	League phase	(Latvia) LASK	—	1–1	19th out of 36
2024–25	Víkingur Reykjavík	Knockout phase play-offs	(Greece) Panathinaikos	2–1	0–2	2–3
2025–26	Valur	First qualifying round	(Estonia) Flora	3–0	2–1	5–1
2025–26	Valur	Second qualifying round	(Lithuania) Kauno Žalgiris	1–2	1–1	2–3
2025–26	Víkingur Reykjavík	First qualifying round	(Kosovo) Malisheva	8–0	1–0	9–0
2025–26	Víkingur Reykjavík	Second qualifying round	(Albania) Vllaznia	4–2 (a.e.t.)	1–2	5–4
2025–26	Víkingur Reykjavík	Third qualifying round	(Denmark) Brøndby	3–0	0–4	3–4
2025–26	KA	Second qualifying round	(North Macedonia) Tikvesh	2–3 (a.e.t.)	1–1	3–4
2025–26	Breiðablik	Play-off round	(San Marino) AC Virtus	2–1	3–1	5–2
2025–26	Breiðablik	League phase	(Switzerland) Lausanne-Sport	—	0–3	30th out of 36
2025–26	Breiðablik	League phase	(Finland) KuPS	0–0	—	30th out of 36
2025–26	Breiðablik	League phase	(Ukraine) Shakhtar Donetsk	—	0–2	30th out of 36
2025–26	Breiðablik	League phase	(Turkey) Samsunspor	2–2	—	30th out of 36
2025–26	Breiðablik	League phase	(Republic of Ireland) Shamrock Rovers	3–1	—	30th out of 36
2025–26	Breiðablik	League phase	(France) Strasbourg	—	1–3	30th out of 36
2026–27	Stjarnan	First qualifying round	(Faroe Islands) Víkingur	3–1	2–2	5–3
2026–27	Stjarnan	Second qualifying round	(Finland) Ilves	1–0	1–2 (a.e.t.)	2–2 (4–5 p)
2026–27	Valur	Second qualifying round	(Bosnia and Herzegovina) Zrinjski Mostar	1–0	2–2	3–2
2026–27	Valur	Third qualifying round	(Denmark) Nordsjælland	0–2	0–5	0–7
2026–27	Vestri	Second qualifying round	(Latvia) RFS	1–1	1–4	2–5
2026–27	Víkingur Reykjavík	Play-off round	(Bosnia and Herzegovina) Borac Banja Luka	1–3	1–3	2–6
