= Juan Martínez Munuera =

Spanish football referee (born 1982)

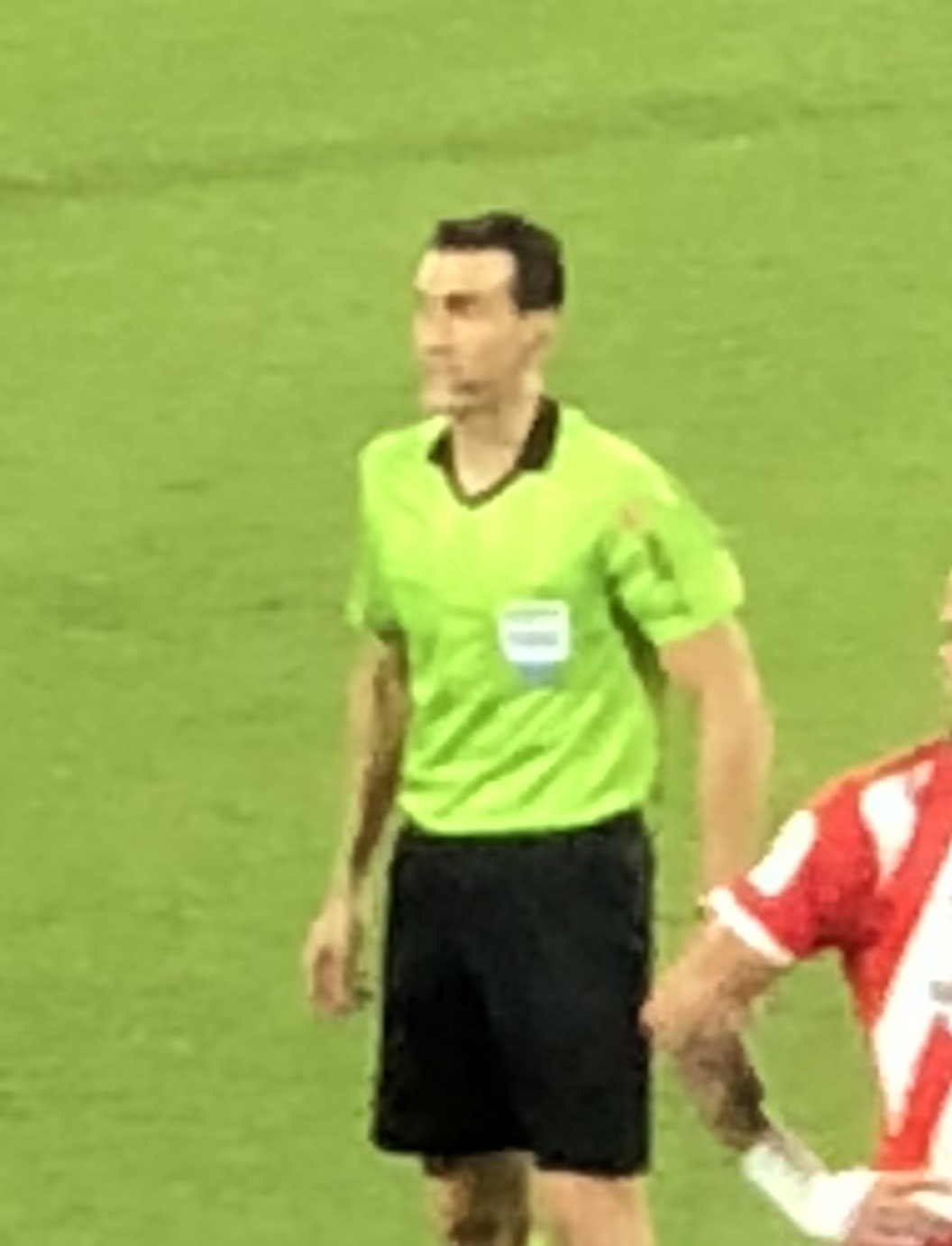
- Martínez Munuera in 2018
- Full name: Juan Martínez Munuera
- Born: 13 July 1982 (age 44); Benidorm, Spain

Domestic
Years	League	Role
2006–2010	Segunda División B	Referee
2010–2013	Segunda División	Referee
2013–	La Liga	Referee

International
Years	League	Role
2015–	FIFA listed	Referee

Juan Martínez Munuera (born 13 July 1982) is a Spanish football referee who officiates in La Liga. He is ranked as a UEFA second category referee.

== Refereeing career ==
Munuera began officiating in the Segunda División B in 2006, the Segunda División in 2010 and La Liga in 2013. In 2011, he refereed a match in the 2011–12 Swiss Challenge League between Stade Nyonnais and Winterthur. He officiated his first La Liga match on 17 August 2013 between Real Sociedad and Getafe.

He was put on the FIFA referees list in 2015. On 2 July of the same year, he officiated his first UEFA club competition match, a meeting between Estonian club Sillamäe Kalev and Croatian club Hajduk Split in the 2015–16 UEFA Europa League first qualifying round. He was selected as an additional assistant referee for the 2017 UEFA European Under-21 Championship in Poland.

Munuera's first senior international match as referee was on 9 May 2018, an international friendly between Saudi Arabia and Algeria. Also in 2018, he was chosen as a referee for the 2018 UEFA European Under-19 Championship in Finland, where he officiated three matches including the final between Italy and Portugal. The following year, he served as a video assistant referee at both the 2019 FIFA U-20 World Cup in Poland and the 2019 FIFA Club World Cup in Qatar, including the final of the latter between English side Liverpool and Brazilian side Flamengo. He also worked as the assistant VAR in the final match of the 2019 UEFA Nations League Finals between Portugal and the Netherlands.

On 17 April 2021, Munuera officiated the 2021 Copa del Rey Final between Athletic Bilbao and Barcelona. On 21 April, he was selected as a video assistant referee for UEFA Euro 2020, to be held across Europe in June and July 2021.
