= 2015–16 UEFA Europa League qualifying =

Preliminary sporting competition

The 2015–16 UEFA Europa League qualifying phase began on 30 June and ended on 6 August 2015. A total of 157 teams competed in the qualifying phase to decide which 44 teams would participate in the play-off round of the 2015–16 UEFA Europa League, the final round before the group stage.

All times were CEST (UTC+2).

== Round and draw dates ==
All draws were held at UEFA headquarters in Nyon, Switzerland.

Round	Draw date and time	First leg	Second leg
First qualifying round	22 June 2015, 13:00 & 14:30	2 July 2015	9 July 2015
Second qualifying round	22 June 2015, 13:00 & 14:30	16 July 2015	23 July 2015
Third qualifying round	17 July 2015, 13:00	30 July 2015	6 August 2015
Play-off round	7 August 2015, 13:00	20 August 2015	27 August 2015

Matches could also be played on Tuesdays or Wednesdays instead of the regular Thursdays due to scheduling conflicts.

== Format ==
In the qualifying phase and play-off round, each tie was played over two legs, with each team playing one leg at home. The team that scored more goals on aggregate over the two legs advanced to the next round. If the aggregate score was level, the away goals rule was applied, i.e., the team that scored more goals away from home over the two legs advanced. If away goals were also equal, then thirty minutes of extra time was played, divided into two fifteen-minutes halves. The away goals rule was again applied after extra time, i.e., if there were goals scored during extra time and the aggregate score was still level, the visiting team advanced by virtue of more away goals scored. If no goals were scored during extra time, the tie was decided by penalty shoot-out.

In the draws for each round, teams were seeded based on their UEFA club coefficients at the beginning of the season, with the teams divided into seeded and unseeded pots. A seeded team was drawn against an unseeded team, with the order of legs in each tie decided by draw. Due to the limited time between matches, the draws for the second and third qualifying rounds took place before the results of the previous round were known. For these draws (or in any cases where the result of a tie in the previous round was not known at the time of the draw), the seeding was carried out under the assumption that the team with the higher coefficient of an undecided tie advanced to this round, which means if the team with the lower coefficient was to advance, it simply took the seeding of its defeated opponent. Prior to the draws, UEFA formed "groups" in accordance with the principles set by the Club Competitions Committee, but they were purely for convenience of the draw and for ensuring that teams from the same association were not drawn against each other, and did not resemble any real groupings in the sense of the competition.

== Teams ==
A total of 157 teams were involved in the qualifying phase and play-off round (including the 15 losers of the Champions League third qualifying round which entered the play-off round). The 22 winners of the play-off round advanced to the group stage to join the 16 teams which entered in the group stage and the 10 losers of the Champions League play-off round.

Below are the participating teams (with their 2015 UEFA club coefficients), grouped by their starting rounds.

Key to colours
Winners of the play-off round advanced to the group stage

Play-off round
Team	Coeff
(Netherlands) Ajax	66.195
(Austria) Red Bull Salzburg	43.135
(Czech Republic) Viktoria Plzeň	41.825
(Romania) Steaua București	40.259
(Switzerland) Young Boys	31.375
(Czech Republic) Sparta Prague	30.825
(Turkey) Fenerbahçe	30.020
(Greece) Panathinaikos	19.880
(Poland) Lech Poznań	17.300
(Azerbaijan) Qarabağ	11.500
(Finland) HJK	11.140
(Norway) Molde	10.375
(Denmark) Midtjylland	7.960
(Hungary) Videoton	7.950
(Moldova) Milsami Orhei	3.750

Third qualifying round
Team	Coeff
(Germany) Borussia Dortmund	99.883
(Russia) Rubin Kazan	57.099
(Spain) Athletic Bilbao	56.999
(Netherlands) AZ	46.695
(Belgium) Standard Liège	25.440
(France) Bordeaux	24.483
(Italy) Sampdoria	18.102
(Portugal) Vitória de Guimarães	17.776
(France) Saint-Étienne	16.983
(Switzerland) Zürich	16.875
(Czech Republic) Slovan Liberec	16.325
(England) Southampton	16.078
(Russia) Krasnodar	15.099
(Portugal) Belenenses	12.276
(Ukraine) Vorskla Poltava	11.033
(Ukraine) Zorya Luhansk	10.533
(Greece) Atromitos	10.380
(Netherlands) Vitesse	10.195
(Czech Republic) Jablonec	9.325
(Austria) Sturm Graz	9.135
(Cyprus) AEK Larnaca	8.460
(Israel) Ironi Kiryat Shmona	7.200
(Turkey) İstanbul Başakşehir	6.520
(Romania) Târgu Mureș	5.259
(Austria) Rheindorf Altach	5.135

Second qualifying round
Team	Coeff
(Denmark) Copenhagen	40.960
(Greece) PAOK	40.880
(Turkey) Trabzonspor	36.520
(Poland) Legia Warsaw	24.800
(Croatia) Rijeka	13.700
(Switzerland) Thun	10.375
(Romania) Astra Giurgiu	9.759
(Belarus) Dinamo Minsk	9.650
(Czech Republic) Mladá Boleslav	8.825
(Belgium) Charleroi	7.440
(Sweden) IFK Göteborg	6.045
(Austria) Wolfsberger AC	5.135
(Israel) Hapoel Be'er Sheva	4.700
(Scotland) Inverness CT	3.580
(Bulgaria) Cherno More	3.350

First qualifying round
Team	Coeff
(England) West Ham United	16.078
(Moldova) Sheriff Tiraspol	14.500
(Norway) Rosenborg	11.875
(Sweden) IF Elfsborg	11.545
(Croatia) Hajduk Split	11.200
(Cyprus) Apollon Limassol	10.460
(Cyprus) Omonia	10.460
(Slovakia) Slovan Bratislava	9.250
(Sweden) AIK	9.045
(Azerbaijan) Neftçi	9.000
(Poland) Śląsk Wrocław	8.800
(Slovakia) Žilina	8.750
(Kazakhstan) Aktobe	8.575
(Netherlands) Go Ahead Eagles	8.195
(Serbia) Red Star Belgrade	7.775
(Hungary) Debrecen	7.700
(Denmark) Brøndby	7.460
(Belarus) Shakhtyor Soligorsk	7.150
(Georgia (country)) Dinamo Tbilisi	6.875
(Bulgaria) Litex Lovech	6.850
(Serbia) Vojvodina	6.275
(Slovakia) Spartak Trnava	6.250
(Iceland) FH	6.100
(Scotland) St Johnstone	6.080
(Bosnia and Herzegovina) Željezničar	6.000
(Denmark) Randers	5.960
(Norway) Strømsgodset	5.875
(Iceland) KR	5.600
(Poland) Jagiellonia Białystok	5.550
(Romania) Botoșani	5.259
(Croatia) Lokomotiva Zagreb	5.200
(Republic of Ireland) Shamrock Rovers	5.150
(Luxembourg) F91 Dudelange	5.025
(Azerbaijan) Inter Baku	5.000
(Northern Ireland) Linfield	4.975
(Bulgaria) Beroe Stara Zagora	4.850
(Malta) Valletta	4.841
(Luxembourg) Differdange 03	4.775
(North Macedonia) Rabotnicki	4.675
(Belarus) Torpedo-BelAZ Zhodino	4.650
(Scotland) Aberdeen	4.580
(Moldova) Dacia Chișinău	4.500
(Slovenia) Koper	4.475
(Republic of Ireland) St Patrick's Athletic	4.400
(Israel) Beitar Jerusalem	4.200
(Bosnia and Herzegovina) Zrinjski Mostar	4.000
(Faroe Islands) HB	3.950
(Montenegro) Budućnost Podgorica	3.875
(Malta) Birkirkara	3.591
(Slovenia) Domžale	3.475
(Liechtenstein) Vaduz	3.450
(Serbia) Čukarički	3.275
(Slovenia) Celje	3.225
(Hungary) Ferencváros	3.200
(Estonia) Nõmme Kalju	3.200
(Estonia) Flora	3.200
(Montenegro) Sutjeska	3.125
(Latvia) Skonto	3.100
(Faroe Islands) Víkingur Gøta	2.950
(North Macedonia) Renova	2.925
(Norway) Odd	2.875
(Albania) Kukësi	2.825
(Azerbaijan) Gabala	2.750
(North Macedonia) Shkëndija	2.675
(Kazakhstan) Kairat	2.575
(Kazakhstan) Ordabasy	2.575
(Hungary) MTK Budapest	2.450
(Armenia) Shirak	2.300
(Montenegro) Mladost Podgorica	2.125
(Albania) Laçi	2.075
(Armenia) Ulisses	2.050
(Moldova) Saxan	2.000
(Northern Ireland) Glentoran	1.975
(Finland) VPS	1.890
(Georgia (country)) Dinamo Batumi	1.875
(Georgia (country)) Tskhinvali	1.875
(Estonia) Sillamäe Kalev	1.700
(Andorra) Lusitanos	1.666
(Finland) SJK	1.640
(Finland) Lahti	1.640
(Iceland) Víkingur Reykjavík	1.600
(Latvia) Jelgava	1.600
(Bosnia and Herzegovina) Olimpic	1.500
(Faroe Islands) NSÍ	1.450
(Andorra) Sant Julià	1.416
(Lithuania) Atlantas	1.400
(Northern Ireland) Glenavon	1.225
(Republic of Ireland) Cork City	1.150
(Republic of Ireland) UCD	1.150
(Lithuania) Kruoja Pakruojis	1.150
(San Marino) La Fiorita	1.099
(Wales) Airbus UK Broughton	1.075
(Albania) Partizani	1.075
(Luxembourg) Progrès Niederkorn	1.025
(Lithuania) Trakai	0.900
(Latvia) Spartaks Jūrmala	0.850
(Malta) Balzan	0.841
(Wales) Bala Town	0.825
(San Marino) Juvenes/Dogana	0.599
(Wales) Newtown	0.575
(Armenia) Alashkert	0.550
(Gibraltar) Europa	0.300

Notes

1. ^{CL-CR} Losers of the Champions League third qualifying round (Champions Route).
2. ^{CL-LR} Losers of the Champions League third qualifying round (League Route).

== First qualifying round ==
=== Seeding ===
A total of 102 teams played in the first qualifying round. The draw was held on 22 June 2015. Teams were pre-assigned numbers by UEFA so that the draw could be held in one run for all groups with ten teams and another run for the group with twelve teams.

Group 1		Group 2		Group 3	
Seeded	Unseeded	Seeded	Unseeded	Seeded	Unseeded
(Moldova) Sheriff Tiraspol (2) (Bulgaria) Litex Lovech (1) (Scotland) St Johnstone (3) (Belarus) Torpedo-BelAZ Zhodino (5) (Slovenia) Koper (4)	(Norway) Odd (6) (Albania) Kukësi (7) (Iceland) Víkingur Reykjavík (9) (Latvia) Jelgava (8) (Armenia) Alashkert (10)	(England) West Ham United (1) (Georgia (country)) Dinamo Tbilisi (2) (Slovakia) Spartak Trnava (3) (Malta) Valletta (4) (Moldova) Dacia Chișinău (5)	(North Macedonia) Renova (7) (Azerbaijan) Gabala (6) (Andorra) Lusitanos (8) (Bosnia and Herzegovina) Olimpic (10) (Wales) Newtown (9)	(Norway) Rosenborg (3) (Belarus) Shakhtyor Soligorsk (4) (Iceland) FH (1) (Luxembourg) Differdange 03 (2) (Scotland) Aberdeen (5)	(Faroe Islands) Víkingur Gøta (10) (North Macedonia) Shkëndija (7) (Finland) SJK (8) (Northern Ireland) Glenavon (9) (Wales) Bala Town (6)
Group 4		Group 5		Group 6	
Seeded	Unseeded	Seeded	Unseeded	Seeded	Unseeded
(Sweden) IF Elfsborg (1) (Denmark) Brøndby (2) (Serbia) Vojvodina (5) (Northern Ireland) Linfield (4) (Republic of Ireland) St Patrick's Athletic (3)	(Latvia) Skonto (10) (Hungary) MTK Budapest (7) (Finland) Lahti (8) (Faroe Islands) NSÍ (9) (San Marino) Juvenes/Dogana (6)	(Croatia) Hajduk Split (1) (Hungary) Debrecen (2) (Bosnia and Herzegovina) Željezničar (3) (Bulgaria) Beroe Stara Zagora (4) (Israel) Beitar Jerusalem (5)	(Montenegro) Sutjeska (6) (Kazakhstan) Ordabasy (7) (Estonia) Sillamäe Kalev (8) (Lithuania) Atlantas (9) (Malta) Balzan (10)	(Cyprus) Apollon Limassol (1) (Serbia) Red Star Belgrade (2) (Denmark) Randers (3) (North Macedonia) Rabotnicki (5) (Montenegro) Budućnost Podgorica (4)	(Estonia) Flora (7) (Kazakhstan) Kairat (6) (Moldova) Saxan (8) (Andorra) Sant Julià (10) (Latvia) Spartaks Jūrmala (9)
Group 7		Group 8		Group 9	
Seeded	Unseeded	Seeded	Unseeded	Seeded	Unseeded
(Cyprus) Omonia (5) (Kazakhstan) Aktobe (2) (Poland) Jagiellonia Białystok (3) (Republic of Ireland) Shamrock Rovers (4) (Bosnia and Herzegovina) Zrinjski Mostar (1)	(Estonia) Nõmme Kalju (6) (Armenia) Shirak (8) (Georgia (country)) Dinamo Batumi (7) (Lithuania) Kruoja Pakruojis (10) (Luxembourg) Progrès Niederkorn (9)	(Sweden) AIK (1) (Netherlands) Go Ahead Eagles (2) (Iceland) KR (4) (Azerbaijan) Inter Baku (3) (Faroe Islands) HB (5)	(Hungary) Ferencváros (6) (Albania) Laçi (10) (Finland) VPS (8) (Republic of Ireland) Cork City (9) (Lithuania) Trakai (7)	(Azerbaijan) Neftçi (1) (Slovakia) Žilina (5) (Norway) Strømsgodset (3) (Luxembourg) F91 Dudelange (4) (Slovenia) Domžale (2)	(Serbia) Čukarički (6) (Montenegro) Mladost Podgorica (8) (Northern Ireland) Glentoran (7) (Republic of Ireland) UCD (9) (Albania) Partizani (10)
Group 10					
Seeded	Unseeded				
(Slovakia) Slovan Bratislava (2) (Poland) Śląsk Wrocław (1) (Romania) Botoșani (4) (Croatia) Lokomotiva Zagreb (3) (Malta) Birkirkara (6) (Liechtenstein) Vaduz (5)	(Slovenia) Celje (8) (Armenia) Ulisses (7) (Georgia (country)) Tskhinvali (12) (San Marino) La Fiorita (10) (Wales) Airbus UK Broughton (11) (Gibraltar) Europa (9)				

=== Summary ===
The first legs were played on 30 June and 2 July, and the second legs were played on 7 and 9 July 2015.

Team 1	Agg.	Team 2	1st leg	2nd leg
Víkingur Reykjavík (Iceland)	2–3	(Slovenia) Koper	0–1	2–2
Sheriff Tiraspol (Moldova)	0–3	(Norway) Odd	0–3	0–0
Kukësi (Albania)	2–0	(Belarus) Torpedo-BelAZ Zhodino	2–0	0–0
Alashkert (Armenia)	2–2 (a)	(Scotland) St Johnstone	1–0	1–2
Jelgava (Latvia)	3–3 (a)	(Bulgaria) Litex Lovech	1–1	2–2
Newtown (Wales)	4–2	(Malta) Valletta	2–1	2–1
Dinamo Tbilisi (Georgia (country))	2–3	(Azerbaijan) Gabala	2–1	0–2
Renova (North Macedonia)	1–5	(Moldova) Dacia Chișinău	0–1	1–4
Olimpic (Bosnia and Herzegovina)	1–1 (a)	(Slovakia) Spartak Trnava	1–1	0–0
West Ham United (England)	4–0 (Note: Order of legs reversed after original draw.)	(Andorra) Lusitanos	3–0	1–0
Glenavon (Northern Ireland)	1–5	(Belarus) Shakhtyor Soligorsk	1–2	0–3
Differdange 03 (Luxembourg)	4–3	(Wales) Bala Town	3–1	1–2
Shkëndija (North Macedonia)	1–1 (a)	(Scotland) Aberdeen	1–1	0–0
Víkingur Gøta (Faroe Islands)	0–2	(Norway) Rosenborg	0–2	0–0
SJK (Finland)	0–2	(Iceland) FH	0–1	0–1
Linfield (Northern Ireland)	5–4	(Faroe Islands) NSÍ	2–0	3–4
Brøndby (Denmark)	11–0	(San Marino) Juvenes/Dogana	9–0	2–0
MTK Budapest (Hungary)	1–3	(Serbia) Vojvodina	0–0	1–3
Skonto (Latvia)	4–1	(Republic of Ireland) St Patrick's Athletic	2–1	2–0
Lahti (Finland)	2–7	(Sweden) IF Elfsborg	2–2	0–5
Atlantas (Lithuania)	1–5	(Bulgaria) Beroe Stara Zagora	0–2	1–3
Debrecen (Hungary)	3–2	(Montenegro) Sutjeska	3–0	0–2
Ordabasy (Kazakhstan)	1–2	(Israel) Beitar Jerusalem	0–0	1–2
Balzan (Malta)	0–3	(Bosnia and Herzegovina) Željezničar	0–2	0–1
Sillamäe Kalev (Estonia)	3–7	(Croatia) Hajduk Split	1–1	2–6
Budućnost Podgorica (Montenegro)	1–3	(Latvia) Spartaks Jūrmala	1–3	0–0
Red Star Belgrade (Serbia)	1–4	(Kazakhstan) Kairat	0–2	1–2
Flora (Estonia)	1–2	(North Macedonia) Rabotnicki	1–0	0–2
Sant Julià (Andorra)	0–4	(Denmark) Randers	0–1	0–3
Saxan (Moldova)	0–4	(Cyprus) Apollon Limassol	0–2	0–2
Progrès Niederkorn (Luxembourg)	0–3	(Republic of Ireland) Shamrock Rovers	0–0	0–3
Aktobe (Kazakhstan)	0–1	(Estonia) Nõmme Kalju	0–1	0–0
Dinamo Batumi (Georgia (country))	1–2	(Cyprus) Omonia	1–0	0–2
Kruoja Pakruojis (Lithuania)	0–9	(Poland) Jagiellonia Białystok	0–1	0–8
Shirak (Armenia)	3–2	(Bosnia and Herzegovina) Zrinjski Mostar	2–0	1–2
Cork City (Republic of Ireland)	2–3	(Iceland) KR	1–1	1–2 (a.e.t.)
Go Ahead Eagles (Netherlands)	2–5	(Hungary) Ferencváros	1–1	1–4
Trakai (Lithuania)	7–1	(Faroe Islands) HB	3–0	4–1
Laçi (Albania)	1–1 (a)	(Azerbaijan) Inter Baku	1–1	0–0
VPS (Finland)	2–6	(Sweden) AIK	2–2	0–4
UCD (Republic of Ireland)	2–2 (a)	(Luxembourg) F91 Dudelange	1–0	1–2
Domžale (Slovenia)	0–1	(Serbia) Čukarički	0–1	0–0
Glentoran (Northern Ireland)	1–7	(Slovakia) Žilina	1–4	0–3
Strømsgodset (Norway)	4–1	(Albania) Partizani	3–1	1–0
Neftçi (Azerbaijan)	3–3 (a)	(Montenegro) Mladost Podgorica	2–2	1–1
Celje (Slovenia)	1–4	(Poland) Śląsk Wrocław	0–1	1–3
La Fiorita (San Marino)	1–10	(Liechtenstein) Vaduz	0–5	1–5
Birkirkara (Malta)	3–1	(Armenia) Ulisses	0–0	3–1
Airbus UK Broughton (Wales)	3–5	(Croatia) Lokomotiva Zagreb	1–3	2–2
Botoșani (Romania)	4–2	(Georgia (country)) Tskhinvali	1–1	3–1
Europa (Gibraltar)	0–9	(Slovakia) Slovan Bratislava	0–6	0–3

== Second qualifying round ==
=== Seeding ===
A total of 66 teams played in the second qualifying round: 15 teams which entered in this round, and the 51 winners of the first qualifying round. The draw was held on 22 June 2015. Teams were pre-assigned numbers by UEFA so that the draw could be held in one run for all groups with 10 teams and another run for all groups with 12 teams.

Group 1		Group 2		Group 3	
Seeded	Unseeded	Seeded	Unseeded	Seeded	Unseeded
(Greece) PAOK (3) (Slovakia) Slovan Bratislava (2) (Montenegro) Mladost Podgorica (4) (Estonia) Nõmme Kalju (5) (Hungary) Ferencváros (1)	(Bosnia and Herzegovina) Željezničar (10) (Croatia) Lokomotiva Zagreb (6) (Republic of Ireland) UCD (8) (Albania) Kukësi (7) (Liechtenstein) Vaduz (9)	(Poland) Legia Warsaw (1) (Norway) Rosenborg (3) (Sweden) AIK (2) (Slovakia) Žilina (5) (Denmark) Brøndby (4)	(Iceland) KR (6) (Romania) Botoșani (10) (Bulgaria) Beroe Stara Zagora (7) (Moldova) Dacia Chișinău (9) (Armenia) Shirak (8)	(Norway) Odd (4) (Cyprus) Omonia (5) (Switzerland) Thun (3) (Kazakhstan) Kairat (2) (Serbia) Vojvodina (1)	(Armenia) Alashkert (8) (Poland) Jagiellonia Białystok (9) (Republic of Ireland) Shamrock Rovers (7) (Israel) Hapoel Be'er Sheva (6) (Latvia) Spartaks Jūrmala (10)
Group 4		Group 5		Group 6	
Seeded	Unseeded	Seeded	Unseeded	Seeded	Unseeded
(Turkey) Trabzonspor (3) (Sweden) IF Elfsborg (6) (Belgium) Charleroi (5) (Belarus) Shakhtyor Soligorsk (4) (Azerbaijan) Gabala (2) (Latvia) Jelgava (1)	(Denmark) Randers (8) (Austria) Wolfsberger AC (12) (Luxembourg) Differdange 03 (9) (North Macedonia) Rabotnicki (10) (Israel) Beitar Jerusalem (7) (Serbia) Čukarički (11)	(England) West Ham United (3) (Croatia) Rijeka (4) (Croatia) Hajduk Split (6) (Cyprus) Apollon Limassol (5) (Belarus) Dinamo Minsk (2) (Czech Republic) Mladá Boleslav (1)	(Norway) Strømsgodset (10) (Scotland) Aberdeen (12) (Slovenia) Koper (8) (Lithuania) Trakai (7) (Malta) Birkirkara (9) (Bulgaria) Cherno More (11)	(Denmark) Copenhagen (3) (Romania) Astra Giurgiu (2) (Poland) Śląsk Wrocław (5) (Hungary) Debrecen (6) (Slovakia) Spartak Trnava (4) (Iceland) FH (1)	(Sweden) IFK Göteborg (7) (Azerbaijan) Inter Baku (10) (Northern Ireland) Linfield (12) (Wales) Newtown (9) (Latvia) Skonto (8) (Scotland) Inverness CT (11)

Notes

1. ^{†} Winners of the first qualifying round whose identity was not known at the time of the draw. Teams in italics defeated a team with a higher coefficient in the first qualifying round, thus effectively taking the coefficient of their defeated opponent in the draw for the second qualifying round.

=== Summary ===
The first legs were played on 16 July, and the second legs were played on 21 and 23 July 2015.

Team 1	Agg.	Team 2	1st leg	2nd leg
Kukësi (Albania)	4–3	(Montenegro) Mladost Podgorica	0–1	4–2
Lokomotiva Zagreb (Croatia)	2–7	(Greece) PAOK	2–1	0–6
Slovan Bratislava (Slovakia)	6–1	(Republic of Ireland) UCD	1–0	5–1
Ferencváros (Hungary)	0–3	(Bosnia and Herzegovina) Željezničar	0–1	0–2
Vaduz (Liechtenstein)	5–1	(Estonia) Nõmme Kalju	3–1	2–0
Beroe Stara Zagora (Bulgaria)	0–1	(Denmark) Brøndby	0–1	0–0
KR (Iceland)	0–4	(Norway) Rosenborg	0–1	0–3
AIK (Sweden)	4–0	(Armenia) Shirak	2–0	2–0
Legia Warsaw (Poland)	4–0	(Romania) Botoșani	1–0	3–0
Dacia Chișinău (Moldova)	3–6	(Slovakia) Žilina	1–2	2–4
Shamrock Rovers (Republic of Ireland)	1–4	(Norway) Odd	0–2	1–2
Hapoel Be'er Sheva (Israel)	2–3	(Switzerland) Thun	1–1	1–2
Kairat (Kazakhstan)	4–2	(Armenia) Alashkert	3–0	1–2
Vojvodina (Serbia)	4–1	(Latvia) Spartaks Jūrmala	3–0	1–1
Jagiellonia Białystok (Poland)	0–1	(Cyprus) Omonia	0–0	0–1
Jelgava (Latvia)	1–2	(North Macedonia) Rabotnicki	1–0	0–2
Čukarički (Serbia)	1–2	(Azerbaijan) Gabala	1–0	0–2
Shakhtyor Soligorsk (Belarus)	0–3	(Austria) Wolfsberger AC	0–1	0–2
Trabzonspor (Turkey)	3–1	(Luxembourg) Differdange 03	1–0	2–1
Charleroi (Belgium)	9–2	(Israel) Beitar Jerusalem	5–1	4–1
Randers (Denmark)	0–1	(Sweden) IF Elfsborg	0–0	0–1 (a.e.t.)
Mladá Boleslav (Czech Republic)	2–2 (a)	(Norway) Strømsgodset	1–2	1–0
Cherno More (Bulgaria)	1–5	(Belarus) Dinamo Minsk	1–1	0–4
Rijeka (Croatia)	2–5	(Scotland) Aberdeen	0–3	2–2
West Ham United (England)	1–1 (5–3 p)	(Malta) Birkirkara	1–0	0–1 (a.e.t.)
Apollon Limassol (Cyprus)	4–0	(Lithuania) Trakai	4–0	0–0
Koper (Slovenia)	4–6	(Croatia) Hajduk Split	3–2	1–4
FH (Iceland)	3–4	(Azerbaijan) Inter Baku	1–2	2–2 (a.e.t.)
Inverness CT (Scotland)	0–1	(Romania) Astra Giurgiu	0–1	0–0
Spartak Trnava (Slovakia)	5–2	(Northern Ireland) Linfield	2–1	3–1
Copenhagen (Denmark)	5–1	(Wales) Newtown	2–0	3–1
Śląsk Wrocław (Poland)	0–2	(Sweden) IFK Göteborg	0–0	0–2
Skonto (Latvia)	4–11	(Hungary) Debrecen	2–2	2–9

== Third qualifying round ==
=== Seeding ===
A total of 58 teams played in the third qualifying round: 25 teams which entered in this round, and the 33 winners of the second qualifying round. The draw was held on 17 July 2015. Teams were pre-assigned numbers by UEFA so that the draw could be held in one run for the group with 10 teams and another run for all groups with 12 teams.

Group 1		Group 2		Group 3	
Seeded	Unseeded	Seeded	Unseeded	Seeded	Unseeded
(Netherlands) AZ (2) (France) Bordeaux (1) (Switzerland) Zürich (3) (Scotland) Aberdeen (5) (Ukraine) Vorskla Poltava (4)	(Belarus) Dinamo Minsk (6) (Slovakia) Žilina (7) (Cyprus) AEK Larnaca (8) (Turkey) İstanbul Başakşehir (9) (Kazakhstan) Kairat (10)	(Denmark) Copenhagen (1) (Greece) PAOK (3) (France) Saint-Étienne (2) (Portugal) Belenenses (4) (Norway) Rosenborg (6) (Switzerland) Thun (5)	(Czech Republic) Jablonec (8) (Sweden) IFK Göteborg (7) (Hungary) Debrecen (9) (Slovakia) Spartak Trnava (10) (Romania) Târgu Mureș (12) (Liechtenstein) Vaduz (11)	(Russia) Rubin Kazan (1) (Poland) Legia Warsaw (2) (Italy) Sampdoria (3) (England) Southampton (4) (Sweden) IF Elfsborg (5) (Ukraine) Zorya Luhansk (6)	(Netherlands) Vitesse (7) (Austria) Sturm Graz (8) (Belgium) Charleroi (9) (Serbia) Vojvodina (10) (Norway) Odd (11) (Albania) Kukësi (12)
Group 4		Group 5			
Seeded	Unseeded	Seeded	Unseeded		
(Germany) Borussia Dortmund (6) (Belgium) Standard Liège (5) (Czech Republic) Slovan Liberec (3) (England) West Ham United (4) (Cyprus) Apollon Limassol (2) (Greece) Atromitos (1)	(Romania) Astra Giurgiu (7) (Sweden) AIK (8) (Israel) Ironi Kiryat Shmona (10) (Austria) Wolfsberger AC (9) (Bosnia and Herzegovina) Željezničar (11) (Azerbaijan) Gabala (12)	(Spain) Athletic Bilbao (3) (Turkey) Trabzonspor (2) (Portugal) Vitória de Guimarães (1) (Russia) Krasnodar (4) (Croatia) Hajduk Split (5) (Cyprus) Omonia (6)	(Slovakia) Slovan Bratislava (7) (Norway) Strømsgodset (11) (Denmark) Brøndby (9) (Azerbaijan) Inter Baku (10) (Austria) Rheindorf Altach (8) (North Macedonia) Rabotnicki (12)		

Notes

1. ^{†} Winners of the second qualifying round whose identity was not known at the time of the draw. Teams in italics defeated a team with a higher coefficient in the second qualifying round, thus effectively taking the coefficient of their defeated opponent in the draw for the third qualifying round.

=== Summary ===
The first legs were played on 29 and 30 July, and the second legs were played on 6 August 2015.

Team 1	Agg.	Team 2	1st leg	2nd leg
Zürich (Switzerland)	1–2	(Belarus) Dinamo Minsk	0–1	1–1 (a.e.t.)
Kairat (Kazakhstan)	3–2	(Scotland) Aberdeen	2–1	1–1
Žilina (Slovakia)	3–3 (a)	(Ukraine) Vorskla Poltava	2–0	1–3 (a.e.t.)
AZ (Netherlands)	4–1	(Turkey) İstanbul Başakşehir	2–0	2–1
Bordeaux (France)	4–0	(Cyprus) AEK Larnaca	3–0	1–0
PAOK (Greece)	2–1	(Slovakia) Spartak Trnava	1–0	1–1
Târgu Mureș (Romania)	2–4	(France) Saint-Étienne	0–3	2–1
Debrecen (Hungary)	3–6	(Norway) Rosenborg	2–3	1–3
Jablonec (Czech Republic)	3–3 (a)	(Denmark) Copenhagen	0–1	3–2
Thun (Switzerland)	2–2 (a)	(Liechtenstein) Vaduz	0–0	2–2
Belenenses (Portugal)	2–1	(Sweden) IFK Göteborg	2–1	0–0
Sampdoria (Italy)	2–4	(Serbia) Vojvodina	0–4	2–0
Kukësi (Albania)	0–4	(Poland) Legia Warsaw	0–3 (Note: Legia Warsaw won 3–0 by default after their first leg match against Kukësi was abandoned when a Legia player was hit by an object from the crowd.)	0–1
Charleroi (Belgium)	0–5	(Ukraine) Zorya Luhansk	0–2	0–3
Sturm Graz (Austria)	3–4	(Russia) Rubin Kazan	2–3	1–1
IF Elfsborg (Sweden)	2–3	(Norway) Odd	2–1	0–2
Southampton (England)	5–0	(Netherlands) Vitesse	3–0	2–0
Slovan Liberec (Czech Republic)	5–1	(Israel) Ironi Kiryat Shmona	2–1	3–0
Apollon Limassol (Cyprus)	1–2 (Note: Order of legs reversed after original draw.)	(Azerbaijan) Gabala	1–1	0–1
Wolfsberger AC (Austria)	0–6	(Germany) Borussia Dortmund	0–1	0–5
AIK (Sweden)	1–4	(Greece) Atromitos	1–3	0–1
Standard Liège (Belgium)	3–1	(Bosnia and Herzegovina) Željezničar	2–1	1–0
West Ham United (England)	3–4	(Romania) Astra Giurgiu	2–2	1–2
Athletic Bilbao (Spain)	2–0	(Azerbaijan) Inter Baku	2–0	0–0
Rabotnicki (North Macedonia)	2–1	(Turkey) Trabzonspor	1–0	1–1 (a.e.t.)
Brøndby (Denmark)	2–2 (a)	(Cyprus) Omonia	0–0	2–2
Rheindorf Altach (Austria)	6–2	(Portugal) Vitória de Guimarães	2–1	4–1
Hajduk Split (Croatia)	4–0	(Norway) Strømsgodset	2–0	2–0
Krasnodar (Russia)	5–3	(Slovakia) Slovan Bratislava	2–0	3–3

== Play-off round ==
=== Seeding ===
A total of 44 teams played in the play-off round: the 29 winners of the third qualifying round, and the 15 losers of the Champions League third qualifying round. The draw was held on 7 August 2015. Teams were pre-assigned numbers by UEFA so that the draw could be held in one run for all groups with 10 teams and another run for all groups with 12 teams.

Group 1		Group 2	
Seeded	Unseeded	Seeded	Unseeded
(Spain) Athletic Bilbao (1) (Czech Republic) Viktoria Plzeň (2) (Romania) Steaua București (3) (Poland) Legia Warsaw (4) (Portugal) Belenenses (5)	(Norway) Rosenborg (6) (Ukraine) Zorya Luhansk (7) (Slovakia) Žilina (8) (Serbia) Vojvodina (9) (Austria) Rheindorf Altach (10)	(Netherlands) Ajax (1) (Greece) PAOK (2) (Switzerland) Young Boys (3) (Belgium) Standard Liège (4) (France) Saint-Étienne (5)	(Azerbaijan) Qarabağ (6) (Norway) Molde (7) (Czech Republic) Jablonec (8) (Denmark) Brøndby (9) (Moldova) Milsami Orhei (10)
Group 3		Group 4	
Seeded	Unseeded	Seeded	Unseeded
(Russia) Rubin Kazan (1) (Austria) Red Bull Salzburg (2) (Turkey) Fenerbahçe (3) (France) Bordeaux (4) (Poland) Lech Poznań (5) (Czech Republic) Slovan Liberec (6)	(Croatia) Hajduk Split (7) (Greece) Atromitos (8) (Belarus) Dinamo Minsk (9) (Hungary) Videoton (10) (North Macedonia) Rabotnicki (11) (Kazakhstan) Kairat (12)	(Germany) Borussia Dortmund (1) (Netherlands) AZ (2) (Czech Republic) Sparta Prague (3) (Greece) Panathinaikos (4) (England) Southampton (5) (Russia) Krasnodar (6)	(Finland) HJK (7) (Switzerland) Thun (8) (Romania) Astra Giurgiu (9) (Denmark) Midtjylland (10) (Norway) Odd (11) (Azerbaijan) Gabala (12)

Notes

1. ^{†} Winners of the third qualifying round.
2. ^{CL} Losers of the Champions League third qualifying round.

=== Summary ===
The first legs were played on 20 August, and the second legs were played on 27 August 2015.

Team 1	Agg.	Team 2	1st leg	2nd leg
Rheindorf Altach (Austria)	0–1	(Portugal) Belenenses	0–1	0–0
Žilina (Slovakia)	3–3 (a)	(Spain) Athletic Bilbao	3–2	0–1
Steaua București (Romania)	1–3	(Norway) Rosenborg	0–3	1–0
Zorya Luhansk (Ukraine)	2–4	(Poland) Legia Warsaw	0–1	2–3
Viktoria Plzeň (Czech Republic)	5–0	(Serbia) Vojvodina	3–0	2–0
Milsami Orhei (Moldova)	1–2	(France) Saint-Étienne	1–1	0–1
Ajax (Netherlands)	1–0 (Note: Order of legs reversed after original draw.)	(Czech Republic) Jablonec	1–0	0–0
Young Boys (Switzerland)	0–4	(Azerbaijan) Qarabağ	0–1	0–3
Molde (Norway)	3–3 (a)	(Belgium) Standard Liège	2–0	1–3
PAOK (Greece)	6–1	(Denmark) Brøndby	5–0	1–1
Bordeaux (France)	2–2 (a)	(Kazakhstan) Kairat	1–0	1–2
Lech Poznań (Poland)	4–0	(Hungary) Videoton	3–0	1–0
Dinamo Minsk (Belarus)	2–2 (3–2 p)	(Austria) Red Bull Salzburg	2–0	0–2 (a.e.t.)
Rabotnicki (North Macedonia)	1–2	(Russia) Rubin Kazan	1–1	0–1
Slovan Liberec (Czech Republic)	2–0	(Croatia) Hajduk Split	1–0	1–0
Atromitos (Greece)	0–4	(Turkey) Fenerbahçe	0–1	0–3
Gabala (Azerbaijan)	2–2 (a)	(Greece) Panathinaikos	0–0	2–2
Southampton (England)	1–2	(Denmark) Midtjylland	1–1	0–1
Astra Giurgiu (Romania)	3–4	(Netherlands) AZ	3–2	0–2
Odd (Norway)	5–11	(Germany) Borussia Dortmund	3–4	2–7
Krasnodar (Russia)	5–1	(Finland) HJK	5–1	0–0
Sparta Prague (Czech Republic)	6–4	(Switzerland) Thun	3–1	3–3

== Statistics ==
There were 693 goals in 270 matches in the qualifying phase and play-off round, for an average of 2.57 goals per match.

=== Top goalscorers ===
Rank	Player	Team	Goals	Minutes played
1	(Slovakia) Róbert Vittek	(Slovakia) Slovan Bratislava	7	391
1	(Croatia) Matej Jelić	(Slovakia) Žilina	7	715
3	(Slovakia) Róbert Mak	(Greece) PAOK	6	464
3	(Sweden) Henok Goitom	(Sweden) AIK	6	470
5	(Armenia) Henrikh Mkhitaryan	(Germany) Borussia Dortmund	5	334
6	15 players		4	—

Source: UEFA.com

=== Top assists ===
Rank	Player	Team	Assists	Minutes played
1	(Switzerland) Steven Lang	(Liechtenstein) Vaduz	4	264
1	(Armenia) Henrikh Mkhitaryan	(Germany) Borussia Dortmund	4	334
1	(Latvia) Edgars Jermolajevs	(Latvia) Skonto	4	360
1	(Northern Ireland) Niall McGinn	(Scotland) Aberdeen	4	512
1	(Sweden) Viktor Claesson	(Sweden) IF Elfsborg	4	567
1	(Brazil) Isael	(Kazakhstan) Kairat	4	703
1	(Croatia) Nikola Vlašić	(Croatia) Hajduk Split	4	717
8	12 players		3	—

Source: UEFA.com
