= Abdoulaye Diallo (footballer, born October 1992) =

Senegalese footballer

Personal information
- Date of birth: 21 October 1992 (age 34)
- Place of birth: Cabrousse, Senegal
- Height: 1.91 m (6 ft 3 in)
- Position: Centre-back

Team information
- Current team: Avenir Beggen
- Number: 15

Senior career*
Years	Team	Apps	(Gls)
2009–2014	Casa Sports		
2014	Atyrau	0	(0)
2015–2016	Jelgava	42	(1)
2018	Atlantas	8	(1)
2019	Narva Trans	10	(2)
2019–2020	Wigry Suwałki	5	(0)
2020–2022	Jeunesse d'Esch	5	(0)
2021–2022	→ US Hostert (loan)		
2024–	Avenir Beggen	1	(0)

International career
2013	Senegal	1	(0)
- * Club domestic league appearances and goals as of 13 October 2024

Abdoulaye Diallo (born 21 October 1992) is a Senegalese footballer who plays as a centre-back for Avenir Beggen.

== Honours ==
Casa Sports

- Ligue 1: 2011–12
- Senegal FA Cup: 2011
- Senegalese League Cup: 2010, 2013

Jelgava

- Latvian Cup: 2014–15, 2015–16

Narva Trans

- Estonian Cup: 2018–19
