= 2014–15 SV Grödig season =

Austrian football club season

SV Grödig is an Austrian football club which is based in Grödig. During the 2014/15 campaign they will be competing in the following competitions: Austrian Bundesliga, Austrian Cup, UEFA Europa League.

== Austrian Bundesliga ==
20 July 2014 Matchday 1	Austria Wien	1–1	SV Grödig	Vienna
16:30 CET	de Paula (yellow card) 29'; Ramsebner (yellow card) 37'; Kienast (yellow card) 44'; Suttner (yellow card) 76'; Kamara 90+3'	Summary	Tomi Correa (yellow card) 37'; Nutz (yellow card) 37'; Schütz 54'; Martschinko (yellow card) 85'; Maak (yellow card) 88'; Djurić (yellow card) 90+2'	Stadium: Generali Arena; Attendance: 7,295; Referee: (Austria) Markus Hameter

27 July 2014 Matchday 2	SV Grödig	2–1	Sturm Graz	Grödig
16:30 CET	Brauer (yellow card) 5'; Tomi Correa (yellow card) 52' (goal) 81'; Reyne 87'; Djurić (yellow card) 90+1'	Summary	Djuricin (yellow card) 24'; Schloffer (yellow card) 25'; Beichler 38'	Stadium: DAS. GOLDBERG Stadion; Attendance: 2,126; Referee: (Austria) Gerhard Grobelnik

3 August 2014 Matchday 3	SV Grödig	0–2	Wolfsberger AC	Grödig
16:30 CET	Martschinko (yellow card) 10'	Summary	Weber (yellow card) 13'; Hüttenbrenner (yellow card) 19'; Žulj 44'; Trdina (yellow card) 60'; Hüttenbrenner 68'; Kofler (yellow card) 86'	Stadium: DAS. GOLDBERG Stadion; Attendance: 1,812; Referee: (Austria) Dieter Muckenhammer

10 August 2014 Matchday 4	FC Red Bull Salzburg	8–0	SV Grödig	Wals-Siezenheim
16:30 CET	Soriano 13'; Mané 20'; Sabitzer 22'; Ramalho (yellow card) 32'; Soriano 39'; Soriano 44'; Soriano 54'; Soriano 65'; Lazaro 74'	Summary	Karner (yellow card) 48'; Tomi (yellow card) 61'	Stadium: Red Bull Arena; Attendance: 12,566; Referee: (Austria) Robert Schörgenhofer

16 August 2014 Matchday 5	SV Grödig	3–0	SC Wiener Neustadt	Grödig
19:00 CET	Nutz 26'; Reyna 81'; Wallner 86'; Wallner (yellow card) 86'	Summary		Stadium: DAS. GOLDBERG Stadion; Attendance: 1,412; Referee: (Austria) Oliver Drachta

23 August 2014 Matchday 6	SV Ried	2–2	SV Grödig	Ried im Innkreis
19:00 CET	Pichler (yellow card) 33'; Kragl (yellow card) 65'; Fröschl 74'; Murg (yellow card) 78'; Elsneg 90'; Lainer (yellow card) 90'	Summary	Karner (yellow card) 21'; Tomi (yellow card) 22'; Reyna 26'; Schütz 30'; Cabrera (yellow card) 36'; Stankovic (yellow card) 77'; Boller (yellow card) 80'	Stadium: Keine Sorgen Arena; Attendance: 4,017; Referee: (Austria) Alexander Harkam

31 August 2014 Matchday 7	Rapid Wien	2–0	SV Grödig	Vienna
16:30 CET	Schrammel 15'; Sonnleitner (yellow card) 58'; S. Hofmann 61'; M. Hofmann (yellow card) 62'; Berić (yellow card) 63'; Schrammel (yellow card) 77'	Summary	Cabrera (yellow card) 44'; Tomi (yellow card) 49'; Karner (yellow card) 52'; Brauer (yellow card) 82'	Stadium: Ernst-Happel-Stadion; Attendance: 12,132; Referee: (Austria) Andreas Kollegger

17 September 2014 Matchday 8	SV Grödig	3–3	SCR Altach	Grödig
18:30 CET	Wallner 17'; Nutz (red card); Reyna 35' (pen.); Karner (yellow card) 44'; Huspek 54' (pen.); Boller (yellow card) 80'; Potzmann (red card)	Summary	Lienhart (yellow card) 9'; Roth (yellow card) 33'; Luxbacher (yellow card) 45'; Lienhart 63'; Zwischenbrugger (yellow card) 70'; Kovačec 73'; Netzer 87'; Pöllhuber (red card) 90'	Stadium: DAS. GOLDBERG Stadion; Attendance: 1,431; Referee: (Austria) Alexander Harkam

20 September 2014 Matchday 9	FC Admira Wacker Mödling	0–0	SV Grödig	Maria Enzersdorf
18:30 CET	Zwierschitz (yellow card) 55'; Wessely (red card); Bajrami (yellow card) 89'	Summary	Karner (yellow card) 14'; Martschinko (yellow card) 31'; Reyna (yellow card) 37'; Maak (yellow card) 47'; Djurić (yellow card) 79'; Brauer (yellow card) 90'	Stadium: BSFZ-Arena; Attendance: 1,771; Referee: (Austria) Andreas Kollegger

27 September 2014 Matchday 10	SV Grödig	0–0	Austria Wien	Grödig
18:30 CET	Brauer (yellow card) 28'; Strobl (yellow card) 73'	Summary	Stryger Larsen (yellow card) 39'; Grünwald (yellow card) 68'; Damari (yellow card) 88'; Leitgeb (yellow card) 90'	Stadium: DAS. GOLDBERG Stadion; Attendance: 1,665; Referee: (Austria) Markus Hameter

4 October 2014 Matchday 11	Sturm Graz	1–0	SV Grödig	Graz
18:30 CET	Madl (yellow card) 22'; Hadžić (yellow card) 56'; Schick (yellow card) 62'; Djuricin 83'; Gruber (yellow card) 88'; Stanković (yellow card) 90'	Summary	Nutz (yellow card) 31'	Stadium: UPC-Arena; Attendance: 9,113; Referee: (Austria) Oliver Drachta

18 October 2014 Matchday 12	Wolfsberger AC	1–2	SV Grödig	Wolfsberg
18:30 CET	Hüttenbrenner 10'; Weber (yellow card) 11'; Hüttenbrenner (yellow card) 38'; Rnić (red card)	Summary	Karner 57'; Reyna (yellow card) 71'; Potzmann 78'; Maak (yellow card) 82'; Huspek (yellow card) 88'; Stankovic (yellow card) 90'	Stadium: Lavanttal-Arena; Attendance: 4,783; Referee: (Austria) Christian Dintar

26 October 2014 Matchday 13	SV Grödig	2–2	FC Red Bull Salzburg	Grödig
18:30 CET	Reyna 7'; Huspek 37' (pen.); Potzmann (yellow card) 48'; Martschinko (yellow card) 83'; Strobl (yellow card) 90'	Summary	Kampl 22'; Gulácsi (red card) 34'; Lazaro (yellow card) 60'; Ramalho (yellow card) 62'; Leitgeb (yellow card) 75'; Sabitzer 81'	Stadium: DAS. GOLDBERG Stadion; Attendance: 3,212; Referee: (Austria) Harald Lechner

5 November 2014 Matchday 14	SC Wiener Neustadt	2–4	SV Grödig	Wiener Neustadt
18:30 CET	Dobras (yellow card) 18'; Dobras 31'; Denner (yellow card) 68'; Freitag (yellow card) 73'; Tieber 88'	Summary	Reyna 4'; Reyna 8'; Reyna 40'; Potzmann (yellow card) 60'; Martschinko (yellow card) 62'; Martschinko 83'; Strobl (yellow card) ?'	Stadium: Stadion Wiener Neustadt; Attendance: 1,000; Referee: (Austria) Alexander Harkam

8 November 2014 Matchday 15	SV Grödig	0–1	SV Ried	Grödig
18:30 CET	Maak (yellow card) 15'; Wallner (yellow card) 71'; Strobl (red card) 81'; Tomi (yellow card) 89'	Summary	Fröschl (yellow card) 16'; Thomalla (yellow card) 69'; Perstaller 83'; Vastić (yellow card) 90'	Stadium: DAS. GOLDBERG Stadion; Attendance: 1,518; Referee: (Austria) Dominik Ouschan

22 November 2014 Matchday 16	SV Grödig	3–1	Rapid Wien	Grödig
16:00 CET	Reyna 6'; Brauer (yellow card) 28'; Huspek 45'; Huspek 73'	Summary	Alar (yellow card) 11'; Alar 14'; S. Hofmann (yellow card) 68'; Sonnleitner (yellow card) 79'	Stadium: DAS. GOLDBERG Stadion; Attendance: 2,647; Referee: (Switzerland) Sandro Schärer

29 November 2014 Matchday 17	SCR Altach	3–1	SV Grödig	Altach
18:30 CET	César (yellow card) 15'; Ngwat-Mahop 20'; Ngwat-Mahop 35'; Seeger 82'	Summary	Schütz 6'; Schütz (yellow card) 40'; Völkl (yellow card) 56'; Nutz (yellow card) 61'; Karner (yellow card) 72'	Stadium: Cashpoint Arena; Attendance: 4,351; Referee: (Austria) Oliver Drachta

6 December 2014 Matchday 18	SV Grödig	5–0	FC Admira Wacker Mödling	Grödig
18:30 CET	Reyna 2'; Schütz 23'; Reyna 37'; Nutz 44'; Brauer (yellow card) 48'; Nutz 68'	Summary	Ebner (yellow card) 51'; Schößwendter (yellow card) 59'	Stadium: DAS. GOLDBERG Stadion; Attendance: 862; Referee: (Austria) Dominik Ouschan

13 December 2014 Matchday 19	Austria Wien	1–0	SV Grödig	Vienna
18:30 CET	Suttner (yellow card) 73'; Kvasina 77'	Summary	Cabrera (yellow card) 39'; Völkl (yellow card) 44'; Reyna (yellow card) 50'; Strobl (yellow card) 68'	Stadium: Generali Arena; Attendance: 6,239; Referee: (Austria) Dieter Muckenhammer

11 March 2015 Matchday 20	SV Grödig	0–2	Sturm Graz	Grödig
18:30 CET	Nutz (yellow card) 39'; Djurić (yellow card) 43'	Summary	Kienast 28'; Spendlhofer 68'	Stadium: DAS. GOLDBERG Stadion; Attendance: 1,980; Referee: (Austria) Andreas Heiß

18 March 2015 Matchday 21	SV Grödig	2–0	Wolfsberger AC	Grödig
18:30 CET	Brauer (yellow card) 5'; Völkl (yellow card) 40'; Karner 56'; Emmanuel 90'	Summary	Jacobo (yellow card) 22'; Weber (yellow card) 46'; Schwendinger (yellow card) 78'; Sollbauer (yellow card) 81'	Stadium: DAS. GOLDBERG Stadion; Attendance: 1,037; Referee: (Austria) Markus Hameter

1 March 2015 Matchday 22	FC Red Bull Salzburg	3–1	SV Grödig	Wals-Siezenheim
16:30 CET	Sabitzer 1'; Ilsanker (yellow card) 50'; Keïta 59'; Sabitzer 77'; Ankersen (red card) 81'	Summary	Tomi 40'; Cabrera (yellow card) 79'; Strobl (red card)	Stadium: Red Bull Arena; Attendance: 6,078; Referee: (Austria) Dominik Ouschan

4 March 2015 Matchday 23	SV Grödig	1–3	SC Wiener Neustadt	Wals-Siezenheim
19:00 CET	Huspek (yellow card) 75'; Goiginger 81'	Summary	Dobras 40'; Hellquist 63'; Sereinig 73'	Stadium: Red Bull Arena; Attendance: 823; Referee: (Austria) Gerhard Grobelnik

7 March 2015 Matchday 24	SV Ried	2–1	SV Grödig	Ried im Innkreis
18:30 CET	Cabrera 13' (own goal); Filipović (yellow card) 58'; Trauner 78'; Murg (yellow card) 79'; Lainer (yellow card) 82'	Summary	Emmanuel 45'; Potzmann (yellow card) 56'; Goiginger (red card) 68'	Stadium: Keine Sorgen Arena; Attendance: 3,471; Referee: (Austria) Julian Weinberger

14 March 2015 Matchday 25	SK Rapid Wien	4–0	SV Grödig	Vienna
18:30 CET	Pavelic 4'; Kainz (yellow card) 6'; Schaub 9'; Kainz 47'; Schobesberger 67'	Summary	Brauer (yellow card) 40'; Cabrera (yellow card) 43'	Stadium: Ernst-Happel-Stadion; Attendance: 15,702; Referee: (Austria) Robert Schörgenhofer

21 March 2015 Matchday 26	SV Grödig	0–1	SC Rheindorf Altach	Grödig
18:30 CET	Karner (yellow card) 49'; Schütz (yellow card) 73'	Summary	Zwischenbrugger (yellow card) 28'; Schreiner 56'	Stadium: DAS. GOLDBERG Stadion; Attendance: 1,150; Referee: (Austria) Harald Lechner

4 April 2015 Matchday 27	FC Admira Wacker Mödling	2–3	SV Grödig	Maria Enzersdorf
18:30 CET	Windbichler 5' (pen.); Kerschbaumer 24'; Bajrami (yellow card) 58'	Summary	Maak (red card) 4'; Karner 27'; Nutz 35' (pen.); Gschweidl (yellow card) 55'; Hart 75'	Stadium: BSFZ–Arena; Attendance: 2,104; Referee: (Austria) René Eisner

11 April 2015 Matchday 28	SV Grödig	1–1	FK Austria Wien	Grödig
18:30 CET	Nutz 56'; Martschinko (yellow card) 57'	Summary	Kvasina 15'; Holzhauser (yellow card) 38'; Holland (yellow card) 54'	Stadium: DAS. GOLDBERG Stadion; Attendance: 1,625; Referee: (Austria) Oliver Drachta

18 April 2015 Matchday 29	SK Sturm Graz	2–1	SV Grödig	Graz
18:30 CET	Gruber (yellow card) 8'; Piesinger 20'; Avdijaj (yellow card) 70'; Kienast 90'; Kienast (yellow card) 90'	Summary	Maak 31'; Strobl (yellow card) 56'; Martschinko (red card); Huspek (yellow card) 72'	Stadium: UPC-Arena; Attendance: 12,466; Referee: (Austria) Gerhard Grobelnik

== ÖFB Cup ==
13 July 2014 1. Round	SV Leobendorf	1–7	SV Grödig	Leobendorf
16:45 CET	Konrad 71'	Summary	Hart (yellow card) 6'; Maak (yellow card) 21'; Gschweidl 25'; Nutz 30'; Reyna 33'; Huspek 48'; Wallner 61'; Tomi 63'; Brauer (yellow card) 80'; Djuric 90'	Stadium: Sportplatz Leobendorf; Attendance: 1,000; Referee: (Austria) Manfred Schüttengruber

23 September 2014 2. Round	Vorwärts Steyr	0–2	SV Grödig	Steyr
19:00 CET		Summary	Strobl (yellow card) 17'; Huspek (yellow card) 43'; Nutz 54' (pen.); Djuric 80'	Stadium: Vorwärts Stadium; Attendance: 1,500; Referee: (Austria) Julian Weinberger

29 October 2014 Round of 16	SKN St. Pölten	0–1	SV Grödig	St. Pölten
19:00 CET	Wisio (yellow card) 9'	Summary	Huspek 22'; Karner (yellow card) 63'	Stadium: NV Arena; Attendance: 1,350; Referee: (Austria) Gerhard Grobelnik

7 April 2015 Quarter-finals	SV Grödig	2–1	Floridsdorfer AC	Grödig
18:30 CET	Gschweidl 15'; Brauer (yellow card) 18'; Nutz 39'; Nutz (yellow card) 63'	Summary	Duran 34'; Haas (yellow card) 44'; Sadović (yellow card) 71'	Stadium: DAS.GOLDBERG Stadion; Attendance: 500; Referee: (Austria) Andreas Heiß

28 April 2015 Semi-finals	SV Grödig	0–2	FC Red Bull Salzburg	Grödig
18:00 CET	Strobl (yellow card) 16'; Nutz (yellow card) 72'; Maak (yellow card) 81'; Handle (yellow card) 84'	Summary	Ilsanker (yellow card) 53'; Quaschner 74'; Sabitzer 78'	Stadium: DAS.GOLDBERG Stadion; Attendance: 1.890; Referee: (Austria) Harald Lechner

== Europa League Qualification ==
17 July 2014 2. Round	FK Čukarički (Serbia)	0–4	(Austria) SV Grödig	Belgrade
21:05 CET	Lucas (red card) 25'; D. Srnić (yellow card) 28'; Stojiljković (yellow card) 44'	Summary	Tomi (yellow card) 28'; Nutz 37'; Maak (yellow card) 50'; Brauer (yellow card) 58'; Schütz (yellow card) 66'; Schütz 80'; Schütz 85'; Nutz 90'	Stadium: Čukarički Stadium; Attendance: 1,500; Referee: (Lithuania) Sergejus Slyva

24 July 2014 2. Round	SV Grödig (Austria)	1–2	(Serbia) FK Čukarički	Wals-Siezenheim
19:00 CET	Karner 29'; Nutz (yellow card) 43'; Karner (yellow card) 75'	Summary	Stojiljković (yellow card) 22'; Pavlović (yellow card) 32'; Bojić 61'; Stojiljković 65'; S. Srnić (yellow card) 71'	Stadium: Red Bull Arena; Attendance: 2,129; Referee: (Israel) Orel Grinfeld

31 July 2014 3. Round	SV Grödig (Austria)	1–2	(Moldova) FC Zimbru	Wals-Siezenheim
21:05 CET	Reyna (yellow card) 69'; Tomi 88'	Summary	Dedov (yellow card) 20'; Alexeev 35'; Handle 59' (own goal); Alexeev (yellow card) 77'	Stadium: Red Bull Arena; Attendance: 1,926; Referee: (Wales) Simon Evans

7 August 2014 3. Round	FC Zimbru (Moldova)	0–1	(Austria) SV Grödig	Chișinău
21:05 CET	Burghiu (yellow card) 12'; Dedov (yellow card) 68'; Spătaru (yellow card) 78'; Jardan (yellow card) 90'	Summary	Djuric 84'; Reyna (yellow card) 87'; Strobl (yellow card) 90'; Tomi (red card)	Stadium: Zimbru Stadium; Attendance: 9,150; Referee: (Finland) Antti Munukka
