= 2014–15 Austrian Football Bundesliga =

103rd season of top-tier football league in Austria

Austrian Bundesliga
- Season: 2014–15
- Dates: 19 July 2014 – 31 May 2015
- Champions: Red Bull Salzburg
- Relegated: Wiener Neustadt
- Champions League: Red Bull Salzburg; Rapid Wien
- Europa League: SCR Altach; Sturm Graz; Wolfsberger AC
- Matches: 180
- Goals: 527 (2.93 per match)
- Top goalscorer: Jonathan Soriano (31)
- Biggest home win: Salzburg 8–0 Grödig (10 Aug 2014)
- Biggest away win: Wiener Neustadt 0–5 Salzburg (26 Jul 2014)
- Highest scoring: Wiener Neustadt 5–4 Admira (23 Aug 2014)
- Longest winning run: Salzburg; Wolfsberger AC (6)
- Longest unbeaten run: Rheindorf Altach (9)
- Longest winless run: Admira (10)
- Longest losing run: Grödig; Wiener Neustadt (4)

Location of teams in the 2014–15 Austrian Football Bundesliga

The 2014–15 Austrian Football Bundesliga was the 103rd season of top-tier football in Austria. FC Red Bull Salzburg won their 9th title, and second in succession.

== Division ==
The Bundesliga is the highest division in Austrian football which took place in the 2014–15 season for the 41st time and determined the 103rd Austrian soccer champion. The main sponsor for this season, was for the first time, the sports betting company Tipico, that is why the official name changed to Tipico Bundesliga.

Lower Austria, Salzburg and Vienna each had two teams, Carinthia, Upper Austria, Styria and Vorarlberg each with one. Burgenland and Tyrol were not represented with a team in Austria's highest league. In the preseason, FC Wacker Innsbruck went down into the First League, and the SC Rheindorf Altach moved up.

The TV provider Sky Germany AG had the rights to show all Bundesliga games in full-length which were broadcast on the Sky sport Austria pay television channel. The channel broadcast all games as conference calls and individually. In addition, the ORF had the rights to broadcast a game of their choice, which was as a single match labeled the "top match of the round" – which usually took place Sundays, when the midweek rounds were on Wednesdays. This was not possible though in the last two rounds where all games had to be broadcast simultaneously. In addition, the ORF was allowed to show a 45-minute summary of the remaining four games of each round.

== Mode ==
In the 2014/15 season, ten clubs played in 36 rounds against each other, as in previous years. Each team played twice against every other team, once at home and once away.

Due to the good European Cup results of the Austrian teams in the 2013/14 season, the ÖFB improved, placing 14th in the UEFA coefficient at the end of the season. Therefore, in the Bundesliga and Cup 2014/15 seasons teams were playing for two spots for the UEFA Champions League and three spots for the UEFA Europa League. Champion and runner up of the Bundesliga are entitled to participate in the qualifiers for the Champions League and then transfer into the third qualifying round; the third and fourth placed teams played in the qualifying for the Europa League and played in the 3rd or 2nd round. The Cup winner played in the play-offs of the Europa League. If the Cup winner qualified for the Champions League or the Europa League, by finishing in one of the top four positions of the Bundesliga, the international starting position of that season dropped and no longer went to the losers of the Cup finales but to the fifth-placed team of Bundesliga.

The last placed Bundesliga team went down into the second classed First League.

== Teams ==
=== Stadia and locations ===
Team	Location	Venue	Capacity
Admira	Maria Enzersdorf	BSFZ Arena	12,000
Austria Vienna	Vienna	Franz Horr Stadium	13,100
Grödig	Grödig	Das Goldberg Stadium	4,638
Rapid Wien	Vienna	Ernst Happel Stadium	50,865
Red Bull Salzburg	Wals-Siezenheim	Red Bull Arena	30,188
Rheindorf Altach	Altach	Cashpoint Arena	8,900
SV Ried	Ried im Innkreis	Keine Sorgen Arena	7,680
Sturm Graz	Graz	UPC-Arena	15,400
SC Wiener Neustadt	Wiener Neustadt	Stadion Wiener Neustadt	10,000
Wolfsberger AC	Wolfsberg	Lavanttal-Arena	8,000

=== Personnel and kits ===
Team	Chairman	Manager	Manufacturer	Sponsors
Admira Wacker	(Austria) Hubertus Thonhauser	(Austria) Walter Knaller	Nike	Flyeralarm
SCR Altach	(Austria) Johannes Engl	(Austria) Damir Canadi	Jako	Cashpoint
Austria Wien	(Austria) Wolfgang Katzian	(Austria) Andreas Ogris	Nike	Verbund
SV Grödig	(Austria) Hannes Codalonga	(Austria) Michael Baur	Nike	Scholz
Rapid Wien	(Austria) Michael Krammer	(Austria) Zoran Barisic	adidas	Wien Energie
SV Ried	(Austria) Johann Willminger	(Austria) Oliver Glasner	hummel	Josko
RB Salzburg	(Austria) Rudolf Theierl	(Austria) Adolf Hütter	Nike	Red Bull
Sturm Graz	(Austria) Christian Jauk	(Germany) Franco Foda	Lotto	Puntigamer
SC Wiener Neustadt	(Austria) Manfred Rottensteiner	(Iceland) Helgi Kolviðsson	Puma	ERGE Beranek
Wolfsberger AC	(Austria) Dietmar Riegler	(Austria) Dietmar Kühbauer	Jako	RZ Pellets

== League table ==
Pos	Team	Pld	W	D	L	GF	GA	GD	Pts	Qualification or relegation
1	Red Bull Salzburg (C)	36	22	7	7	99	42	+57	73	Qualification for the Champions League third qualifying round
2	Rapid Wien	36	19	10	7	68	38	+30	67	Qualification for the Champions League third qualifying round
3	SCR Altach	36	17	8	11	50	49	+1	59	Qualification for the Europa League third qualifying round
4	Sturm Graz	36	16	10	10	57	41	+16	58	Qualification for the Europa League third qualifying round
5	Wolfsberger AC	36	16	4	16	44	50	−6	52	Qualification for the Europa League second qualifying round
6	Ried	36	12	8	16	49	51	−2	44	
7	Austria Wien	36	10	13	13	45	51	−6	43	
8	Grödig	36	10	7	19	46	65	−19	37	
9	Admira Wacker	36	7	13	16	32	61	−29	34	
10	Wiener Neustadt (R)	36	7	8	21	37	79	−42	29	Relegation to Austrian Football First League

Source: weltfussball.de (in German)
Rules for classification: 1) points; 2) goal difference; 3) number of goals scored
(C) Champions; (R) Relegated

== Results ==
=== First half of season ===
Home \ Away	ADM	AWI	ALT	GRÖ	RWI	RBS	RIE	STU	WN	WOL
Admira Wacker Mödling		2–1	0–2	0–0	1–1	0–3	0–0	0–2	1–1	1–4
Austria Wien	4–0		0–0	1–1	2–2	2–4	3–1	0–3	2–0	0–2
Rheindorf Altach	0–2	1–1		3–1	2–0	4–1	2–2	2–1	2–0	1–2
Grödig	5–0	0–0	3–3		3–1	2–2	0–1	2–1	3–0	0–2
Rapid Wien	0–0	2–3	0–1	2–0		1–2	1–0	1–1	3–0	3–0
Red Bull Salzburg	2–0	2–3	5–0	8–0	6–1		4–2	2–3	4–1	2–2
Ried	1–1	1–1	2–1	2–2	1–2	0–2		0–1	3–1	1–0
Sturm Graz	0–2	1–1	2–2	1–0	1–3	1–2	3–1		4–2	1–2
Wiener Neustadt	5–4	2–2	2–0	2–4	1–5	0–5	0–1	0–0		2–0
Wolfsberger AC	2–1	4–0	0–0	1–2	1–1	1–0	4–1	0–2	0–1	

Source: weltfussball.de (in German)
Legend: Blue = home team win; Yellow = draw; Red = away team win.

=== Second half of season ===
Home \ Away	ADM	AWI	ALT	GRÖ	RWI	RBS	RIE	STU	WN	WOL
Admira Wacker Mödling		1–1	2–2	2–3	1–1	1–4	1–0	1–2	0–0	2–1
Austria Wien	0–1		5–2	1–0	2–1	1–1	0–1	0–0	2–1	1–1
Rheindorf Altach	2–0	2–0		2–0	1–3	2–2	2–1	2–0	3–1	1–0
Grödig	0–1	1–1	0–1		0–2	0–3	3–2	0–2	1–3	2–0
Rapid Wien	1–1	4–1	1–0	4–0		3–3	3–0	1–0	0–0	4–1
Red Bull Salzburg	4–0	3–1	0–1	3–1	1–2		2–1	2–1	6–0	3–0
Ried	2–2	0–2	4–1	2–1	0–1	2–2		1–2	6–0	4–0
Sturm Graz	3–1	2–1	5–0	2–1	2–2	0–0	0–0		3–3	2–0
Wiener Neustadt	0–0	1–0	0–1	2–4	0–1	0–2	0–1	4–4		2–0
Wolfsberger AC	2–0	1–0	2–0	2–1	0–5	3–2	1–2	1–0	2–0	

Source: weltfussball.de (in German)
Legend: Blue = home team win; Yellow = draw; Red = away team win.

== Season statistics ==
=== Top goalscorers ===
As of matches played 31 May 2015

Rank	Player	Team	Goals
1	(Spain) Jonathan Soriano	Red Bull Salzburg	31
2	(Slovenia) Robert Berić	Rapid Wien	27
3	(Austria) Marcel Sabitzer	Red Bull Salzburg	19
4	(Austria) Marco Djuricin	Sturm Graz / Red Bull Salzburg	13
5	(Austria) Johannes Aigner	Rheindorf Altach	12
6	(Peru) Yordy Reyna	Grödig	11
7	(Germany) Denis Thomalla	Ried	10
8	(Brazil) Alan	Red Bull Salzburg	9
8	(Austria) Simon Piesinger	Sturm Graz	9

== Awards ==
=== Annual awards ===
==== Player of the Year ====
The Player of the Year awarded to (Spain) Jonathan Soriano (Red Bull Salzburg)

==== Top goalscorer ====
The Top goalscorer of the Year awarded to (Spain) Jonathan Soriano (Red Bull Salzburg)

==== Goalkeeper of the Year ====
The Goalkeeper of the Year awarded to (Austria) Cican Stanković (Grödig)

=== Team of the Season ===

Team of the Year
Goalkeeper	(Austria) Cican Stanković (Grödig)			
Defence	(Austria) Stefan Lainer (SV Ried)	(Austria) Martin Hinteregger (Red Bull Salzburg)	(Austria) Mario Sonnleitner (Rapid Wien)	(Austria) Andreas Ulmer (Red Bull Salzburg)
Midfield	(Austria) Boris Hüttenbrenner (Wolfsberger AC)	(Guinea) Naby Keïta (Red Bull Salzburg)	(Austria) Marcel Sabitzer (Rapid Wien)	(Austria) Philipp Schobesberger (Rapid Wien)
Attack	(Spain) Jonatan Soriano (Red Bull Salzburg)		(Slovenia) Robert Berić (Rapid Wien)	

== Attendances ==
#	Club	Average
1	Rapid	16,770
2	Sturm	10,132
3	Salzburg	10,013
4	Austria	6,773
5	Altach	5,357
6	WAC	5,279
7	Ried	4,128
8	Admira	3,168
9	Wiener Neustadt	2,526
10	Grödig	1,650
