= Maximilian Karner =

Austrian footballer

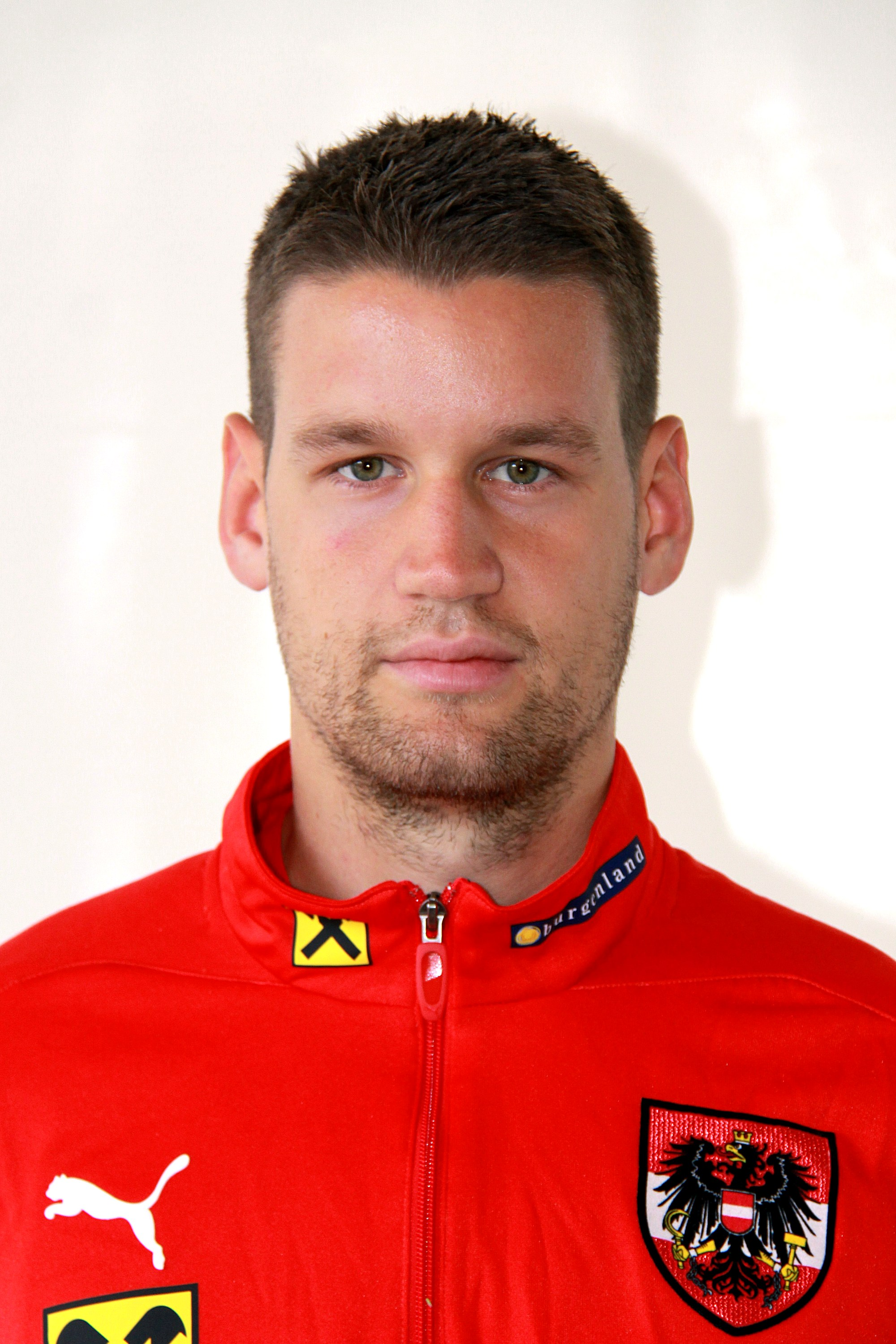
- Karner with Austria U21 in 2010

Personal information
- Date of birth: 3 January 1990 (age 36)
- Place of birth: Salzburg, Austria
- Height: 1.84 m (6 ft 1/2 in)
- Position: Centre back

Team information
- Current team: UFC Siezenheim

Youth career
- 2005–2009: Red Bull Salzburg

Senior career*
Years	Team	Apps	(Gls)
2009–2010	Red Bull Salzburg B	23	(0)
2010–2013	SV Ried	18	(0)
2010–2011	→ SV Grödig (loan)	29	(0)
2013–2015	SV Grödig	45	(4)
2015–2016	Levski Sofia	20	(1)
2016	Derry City	5	(0)
2017–	UFC Siezenheim	0	(0)
- * Club domestic league appearances and goals as of 7 May 2016

Maximilian Karner (born 3 January 1990) is an Austrian footballer who currently plays as a defender for UFC Siezenheim.

== Club career ==
Karner started his career in 2005 in Red Bull Salzburg. In 2010, he moved to SV Ried, but in the same year he was loaned to SV Grödig. In June 2011 he came back to SV Ried. In 2013, he signed one-year deal with SV Grödig.

On 6 July 2015, Karner signed two-year deal with Levski Sofia in Bulgaria. He made his Levski debut against Botev Plovdiv on 18 July, starting as a centre back in a 1–1 league draw.

On 19 August 2016, Karner signed a short-term deal until the end of the season at Derry City where he linked up with former teammate Lukas Schubert. He made his debut for the club in a 2–2 draw with Bray Wanderers at the Carlisle Grounds on 27 August 2016.

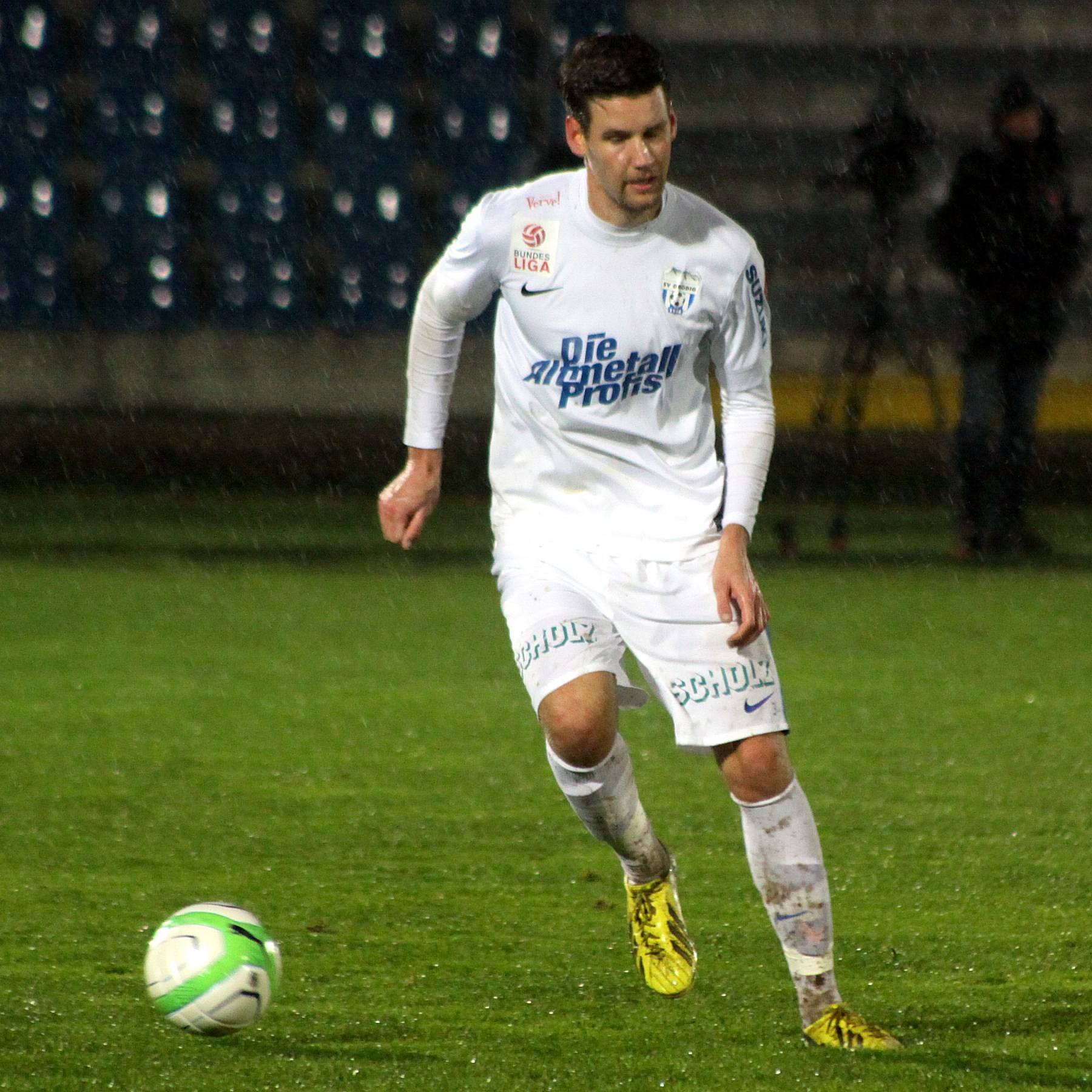
Karner playing for Grödig in 2013

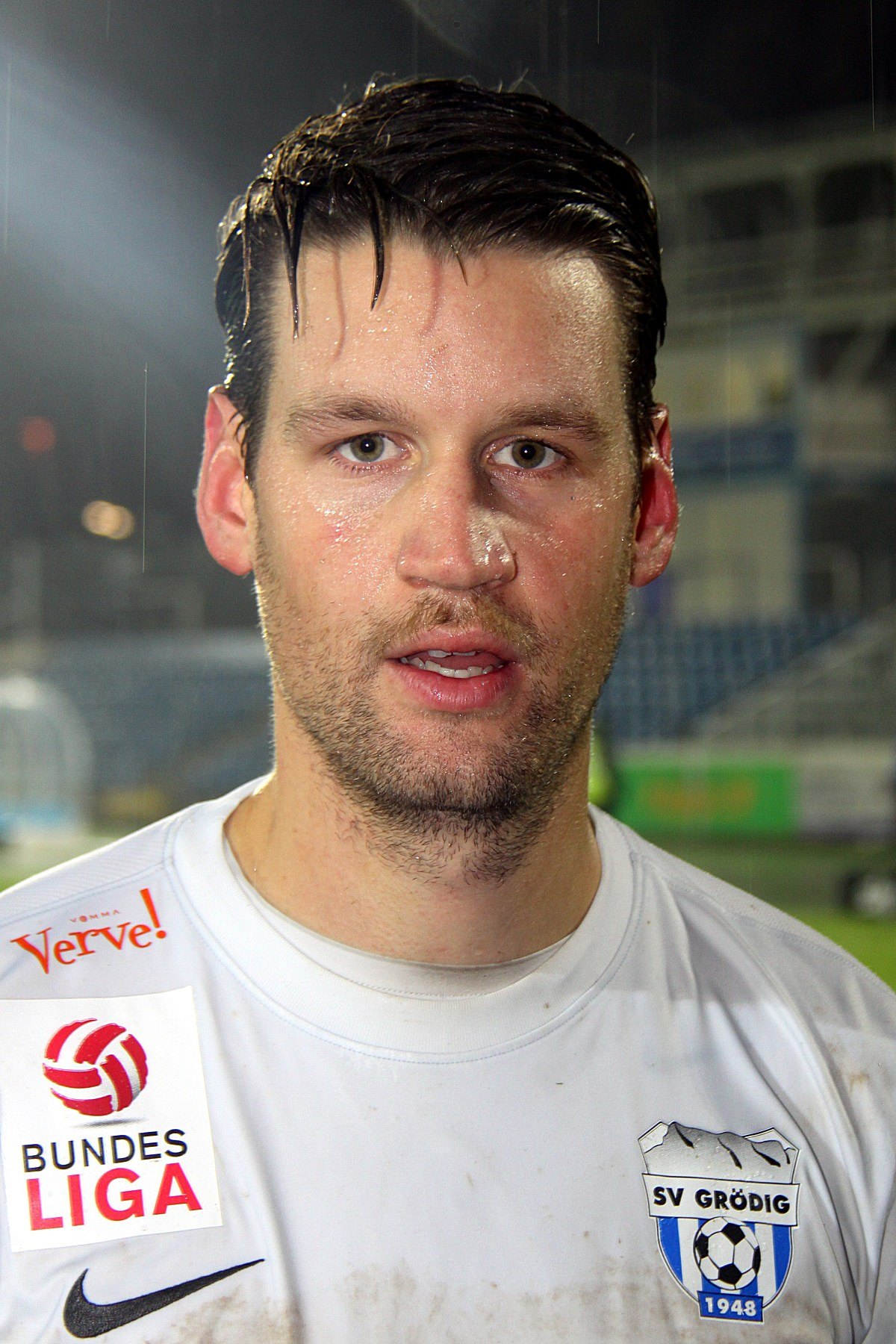
Maximilian Karner (23 November 2013)

== Statistics ==
As of 1 July 2016

Club performance			League		Cup		Continental		Other		Total	
Club	League	Season	Apps	Goals	Apps	Goals	Apps	Goals	Apps	Goals	Apps	Goals
Austria			League		Austrian Cup		Europe		Other		Total	
Red Bull Salzburg B	Austrian First League	2009–10	23	0	0	0	–		–		23	0
Red Bull Salzburg B	Total		23	0	0	0	0	0	0	0	23	0
SV Grödig	Austrian First League	2010–11	29	0	2	0	–		–		31	0
SV Grödig	Total		29	0	2	0	0	0	0	0	31	0
SV Ried	Austrian Bundesliga	2011–12	12	0	2	0	3	0	–		17	0
SV Ried	Austrian Bundesliga	2012–13	6	0	1	0	–		–		7	0
SV Ried	Total		18	0	3	0	3	0	0	0	24	0
SV Grödig	Austrian Bundesliga	2013–14	22	1	0	0	–		–		22	1
SV Grödig	Austrian Bundesliga	2014–15	23	3	2	0	4	1	–		29	4
SV Grödig	Total		45	4	2	0	4	1	0	0	51	5
Bulgaria			League		Bulgarian Cup		Europe		Other (Note: Includes Bulgarian Supercup matches.)		Total	
Levski Sofia	A Group	2015–16	20	1	3	0	–		–		23	1
Levski Sofia	Total		20	1	3	0	0	0	0	0	23	1
Career statistics			135	5	10	0	7	1	0	0	152	6
