= Simon Handle =

German footballer

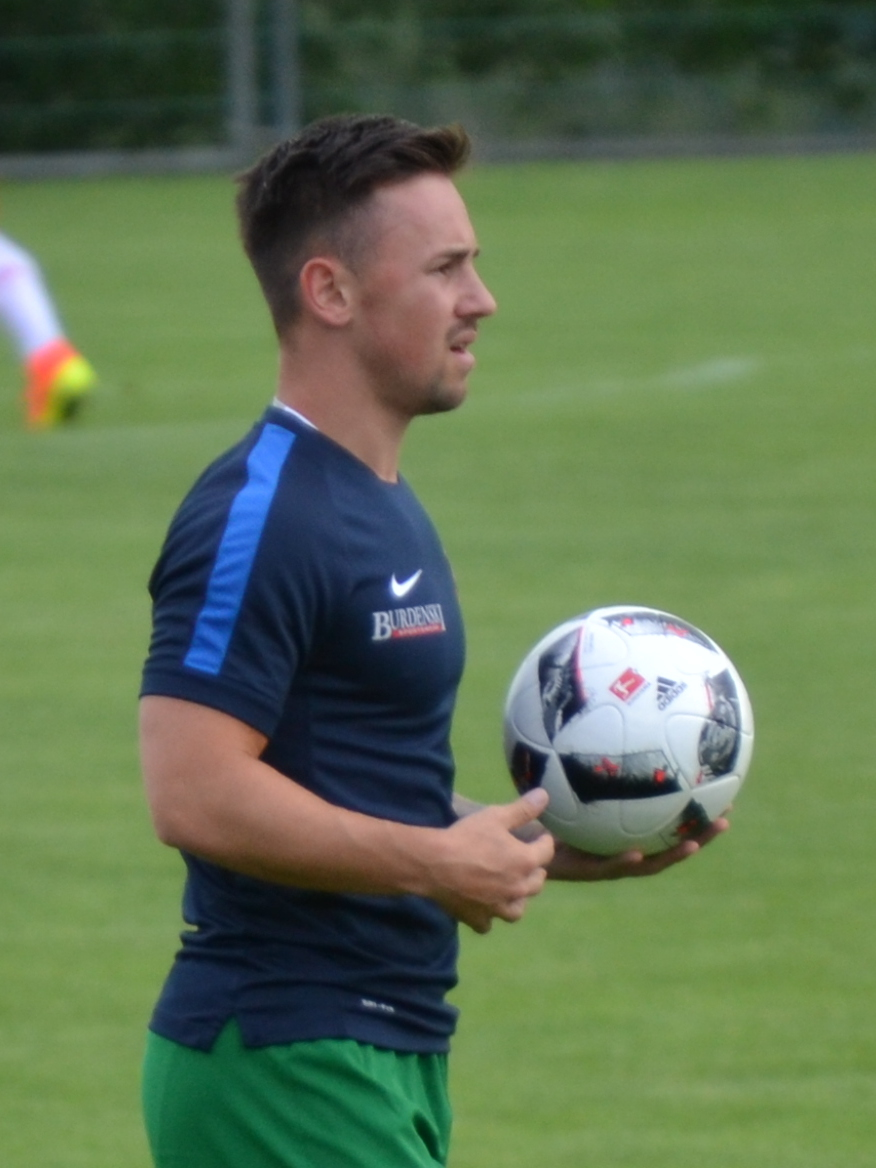
- Handle with Erzgebirge Aue in 2016

Personal information
- Date of birth: 25 January 1993 (age 33)
- Place of birth: Trostberg, Germany
- Height: 1.70 m (5 ft 7 in)
- Position: Right winger

Team information
- Current team: UFC Hallein
- Number: 7

Youth career
- –2008: Wacker Burghausen
- 2008–2012: Red Bull Salzburg

Senior career*
Years	Team	Apps	(Gls)
2012–2015	SV Grödig	61	(2)
2015–2017	Erzgebirge Aue	27	(1)
2017	→ SV Elversberg (loan)	14	(1)
2017–2026	Viktoria Köln	282	(41)
2026–	UFC Hallein	0	(0)
- * Club domestic league appearances and goals as of 29 May 2026

Simon Handle (born 25 January 1993) is a German professional footballer who plays as a right winger for Austrian Regionalliga club UFC Hallein.

== Career statistics ==
As of match played 16 May 2026

Appearances and goals by club, season and competition
Club	Season	League			National cup (Note: Includes Austrian Cup, DFB-Pokal)		Continental		Other		Total	
Club	Season	Division	Apps	Goals	Apps	Goals	Apps	Goals	Apps	Goals	Apps	Goals
USK Anif	2010–11	Austrian Regionalliga	18	6	0	0	—		—		18	6
USK Anif	2011–12	Austrian Regionalliga	29	11	3	1	—		—		32	12
USK Anif	Total		47	17	3	1	—		—		50	18
SV Grödig	2012–13	Austrian First League	31	2	2	0	—		—		33	2
SV Grödig	2013–14	Austrian Bundesliga	15	0	1	0	—		—		16	0
SV Grödig	2014–15	Austrian Bundesliga	15	0	2	0	4 (Note: Appearances in UEFA Europa League)	0	—		21	0
SV Grödig	Total		61	2	5	0	4	0	—		70	2
Erzgebirge Aue	2015–16	3. Liga	24	1	3	0	—		—		27	1
Erzgebirge Aue	2016–17	2. Bundesliga	3	0	0	0	—		—		3	0
Erzgebirge Aue	Total		27	1	3	0	—		—		30	1
SV Elversberg (loan)	2016–17	Regionalliga	13	1	—		—		1 (Note: Appearance(s) in Regionalliga Promotion play-offs)	0	14	1
Viktoria Köln	2017–18	Regionalliga	29	13	—		—		—		29	13
Viktoria Köln	2018–19	Regionalliga	11	0	0	0	—		—		11	0
Viktoria Köln	2019–20	3. Liga	38	8	—		—		—		38	8
Viktoria Köln	2020–21	3. Liga	31	2	—		—		—		31	2
Viktoria Köln	2021–22	3. Liga	36	6	1	1	—		—		37	7
Viktoria Köln	2022–23	3. Liga	36	4	1	0	—		—		37	4
Viktoria Köln	2023–24	3. Liga	36	4	2	0	—		—		38	4
Viktoria Köln	2024–25	3. Liga	29	2	—		—		—		29	2
Viktoria Köln	2025–26	3. Liga	36	2	1	0	—		—		37	2
Viktoria Köln	Total		282	41	5	1	—		—		287	42
Career total			430	62	16	2	4	0	1	0	451	64
