= Sandro Djurić =

Austrian footballer

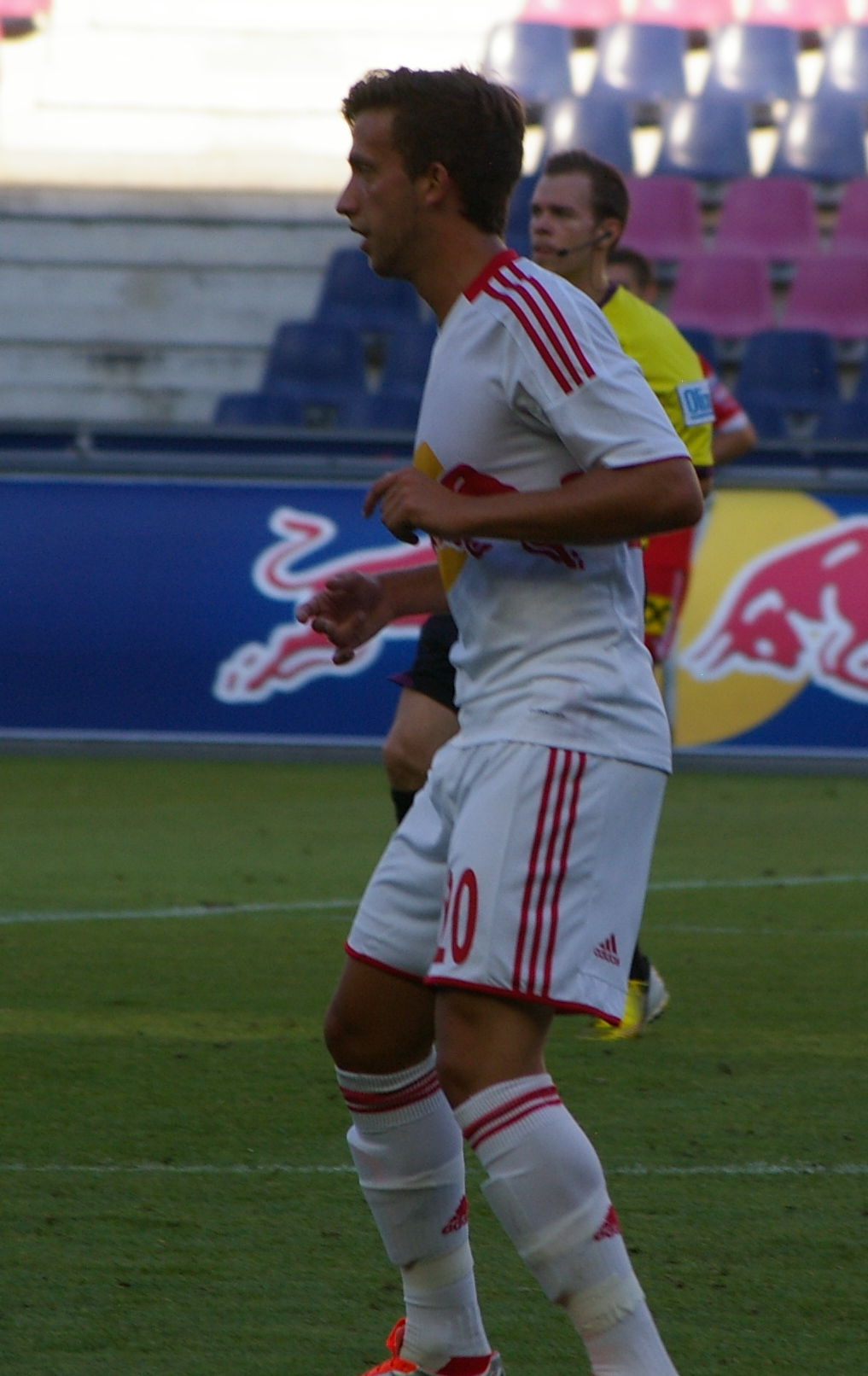

Personal information
- Date of birth: 15 February 1994 (age 32)
- Place of birth: Schwarzach im Pongau, Austria
- Height: 1.78 m (5 ft 10 in)
- Position: Midfielder

Team information
- Current team: TSV St. Johann
- Number: 10

Youth career
- 2001–2007: SK Bischofshofen
- 2007–2010: Red Bull Salzburg

Senior career*
Years	Team	Apps	(Gls)
2011–2012	Red Bull Salzburg Juniors	24	(5)
2012–2014	Liefering	55	(13)
2014–2016	Grödig	45	(2)
2016–2017	Wiener Neustadt	27	(1)
2017–2019	Austria Lustenau	38	(4)
2019–2020	Rapid București	17	(2)
2020–2021	Dunărea Călărași	22	(0)
2021–	TSV St. Johann	115	(19)

International career
2009–2010	Austria U16	6	(1)
2010–2011	Austria U17	7	(0)
2011	Austria U18	1	(0)
2012	Austria U19	2	(0)
2015	Austria U21	2	(0)
- * Club domestic league appearances and goals as of 27 June 2026

Sandro Djurić (born 15 February 1994) is an Austrian footballer who plays for TSV St. Johann. In the past, Djurić played in its home country for teams such as FC Liefering, SV Grödig, Wiener Neustadt or Austria Lustenau. He is of Serbian descent.

== Honours ==
FC Liefering

- Regionalliga West: 2012–13
