= Ione Cabrera =

Spanish footballer

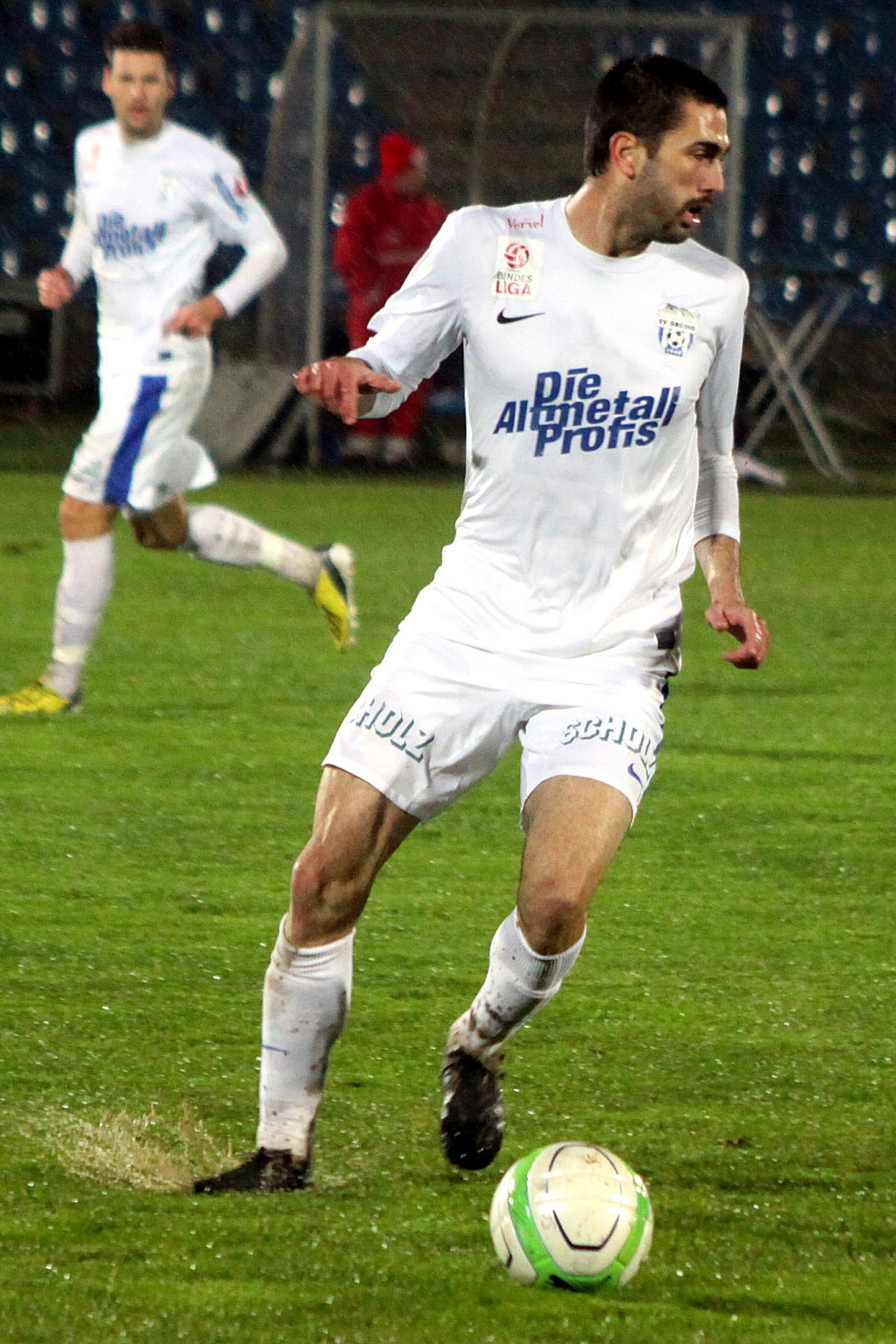

Personal information
- Full name: Ione Agoney Jiménez Cabrera
- Date of birth: 13 October 1985 (age 41)
- Place of birth: Las Palmas, Spain
- Height: 1.88 m (6 ft 2 in)
- Position: Centre back

Team information
- Current team: ASK Trumau

Senior career*
Years	Team	Apps	(Gls)
2004–2009	Las Palmas	53	(0)
2008	→ Osasuna B (loan)	18	(0)
2009	→ Jerez Industrial (loan)	13	(0)
2009–2011	Rheindorf Altach	42	(1)
2011–2015	Grödig	87	(6)
2015–2016	LASK Linz	20	(2)
2016–2018	Admira Wacker	2	(0)
2018–2020	WSG Swarovski Tirol	36	(5)
2021–2023	SC Mannswörth	39	(3)
2023–2024	SC Weissenbach		
2024–	ASK Trumau		
- * Club domestic league appearances and goals as of 16 June 2023

Ione Agoney Jiménez Cabrera (born 13 October 1985) is a Spanish footballer who plays as a centre back for Austrian club ASK Trumau.

== Honors ==
Grödig

- Erste Liga (1): 2012-13
