= Tomi Correa =

Spanish footballer

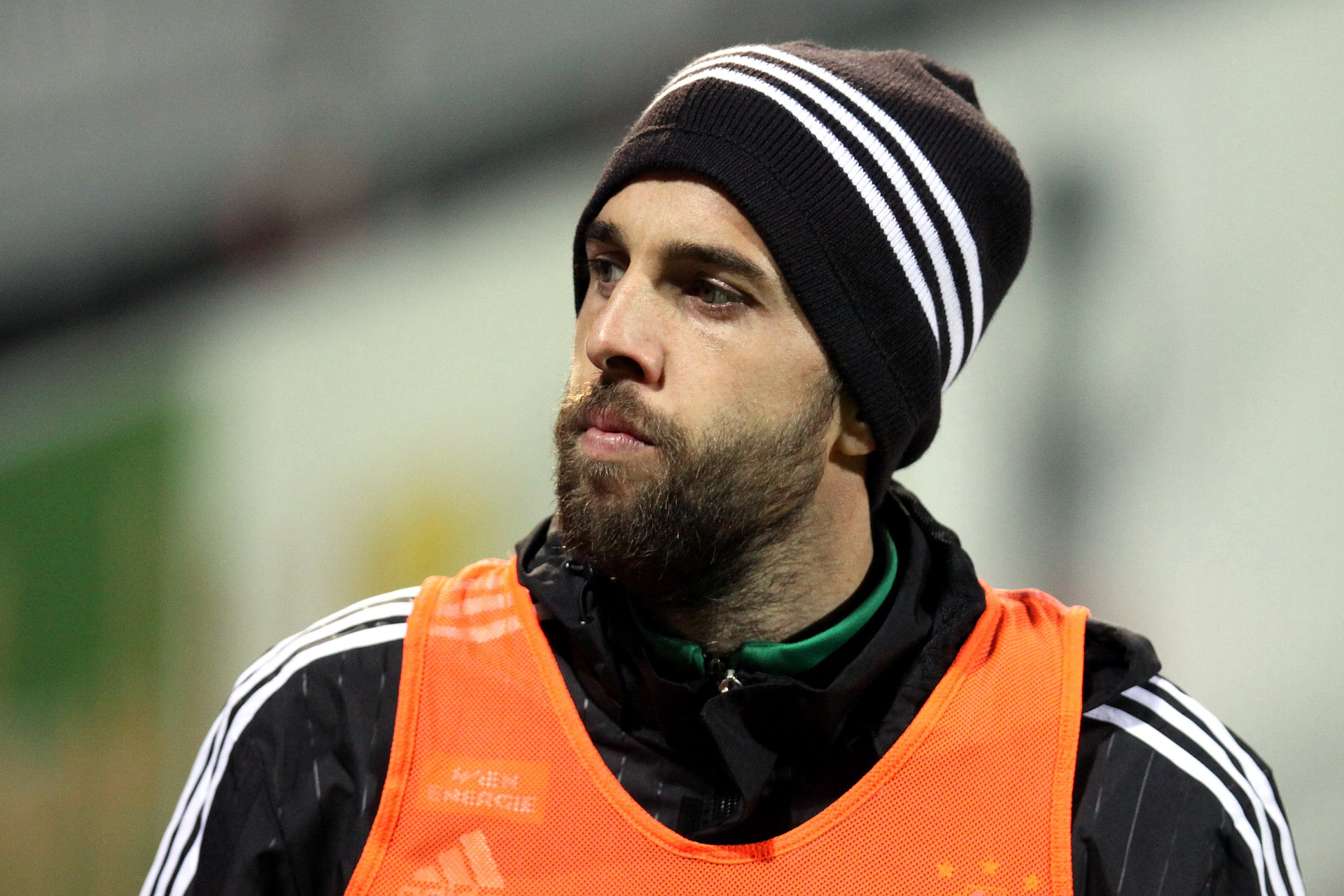

Personal information
- Full name: Tomás Esteban Correa Miranda
- Date of birth: 5 December 1984 (age 41)
- Place of birth: Santa Cruz, Spain
- Height: 1.80 m (5 ft 11 in)
- Position: Striker

Senior career*
Years	Team	Apps	(Gls)
2005–2007	Tenerife	5	(1)
2007	→ Badalona (loan)	11	(2)
2007–2008	Logroñés	30	(5)
2008–2009	Tegueste		
2009–2013	Rheindorf Altach	98	(43)
2011	→ Rheindorf Altach II	1	(1)
2013–2015	SV Grödig	51	(14)
2015–2017	Rapid Wien	14	(4)
2018–2019	Atlético Victoria		
- * Club domestic league appearances and goals

Tomás Esteban Correa Miranda, known as Tomi Correa (born 5 December 1984) is a Spanish former footballer.

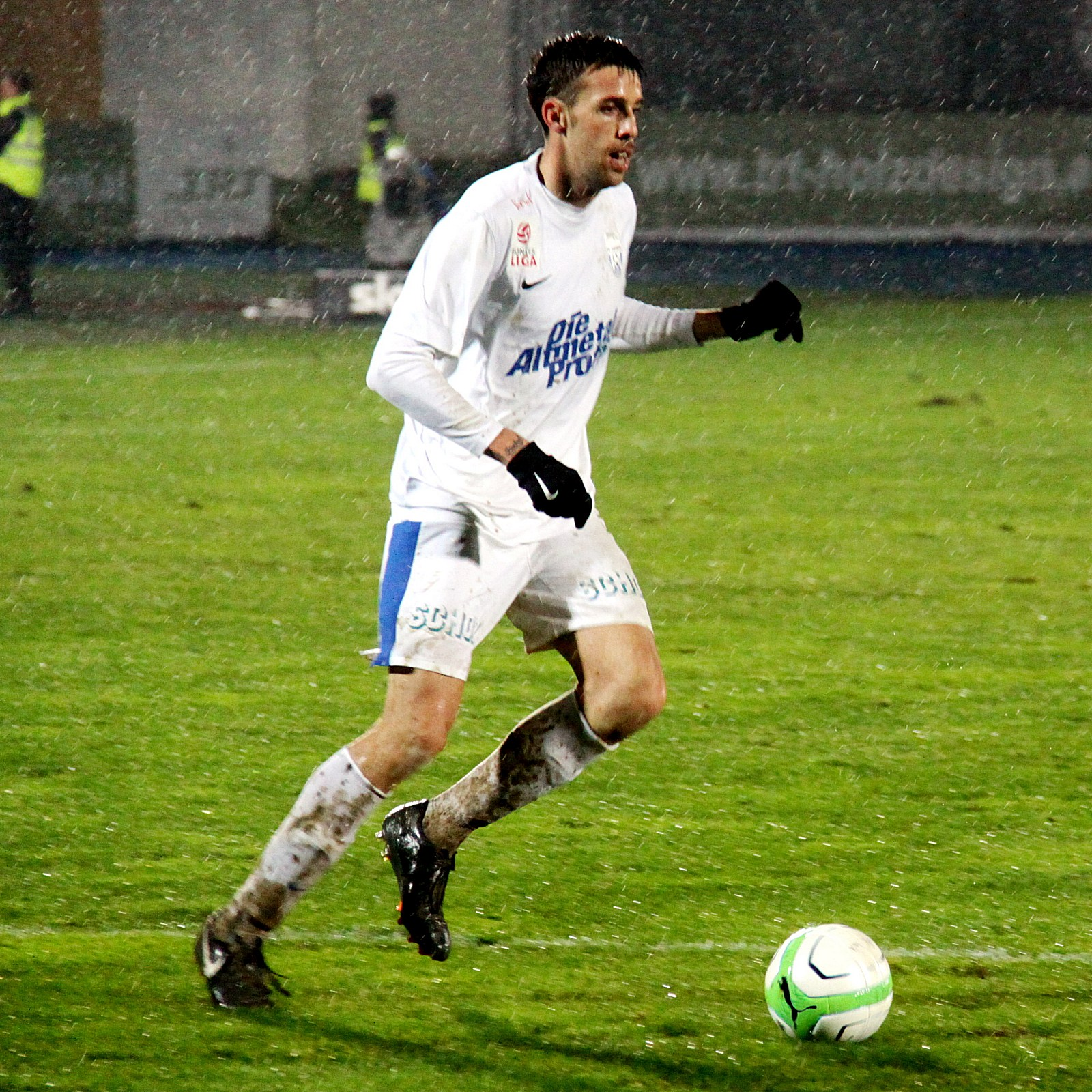
Tomi Correa (23 November 2013)
