= Gerald Nutz =

Austrian footballer

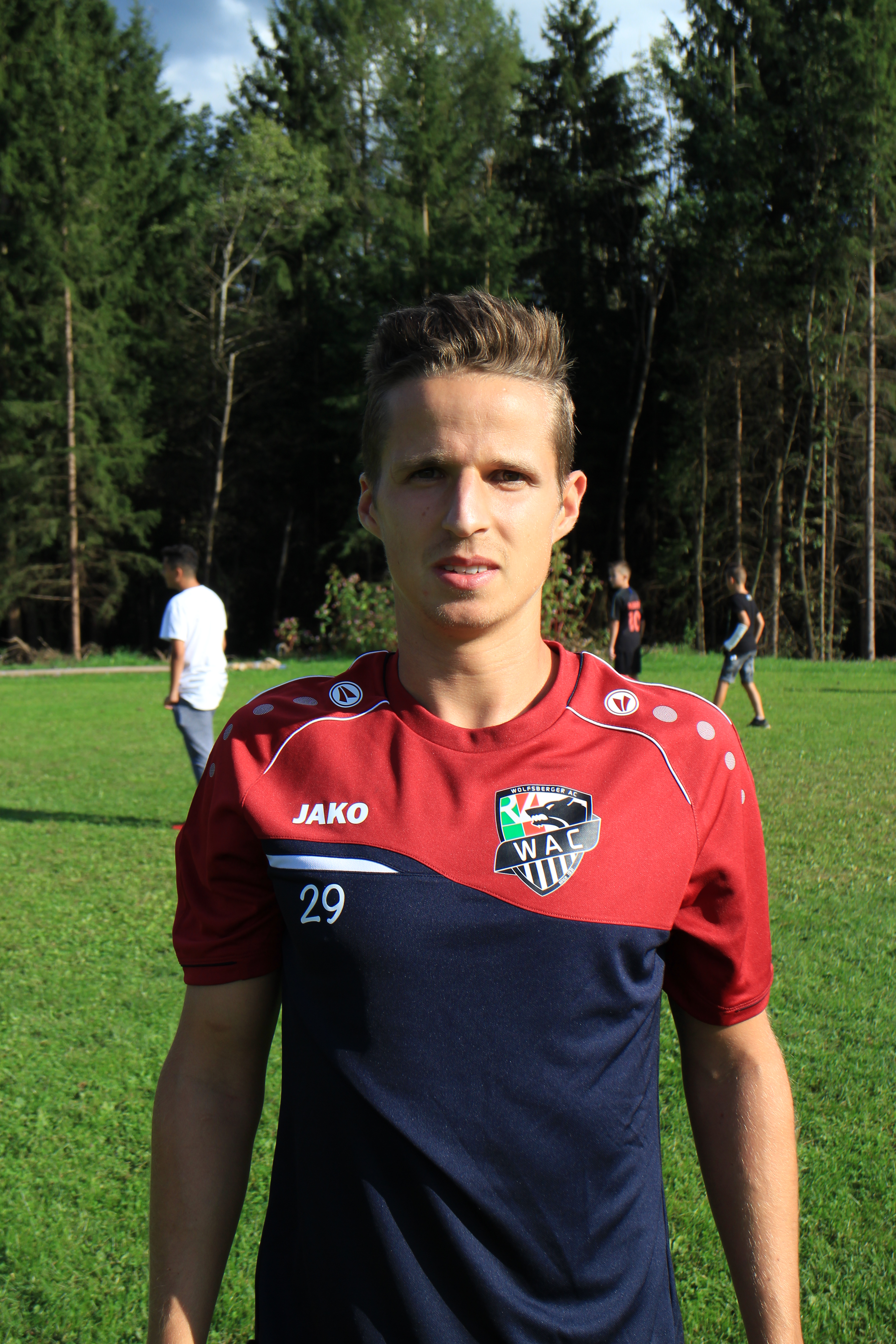

Personal information
- Date of birth: 25 January 1994 (age 32)
- Place of birth: Judenburg, Austria
- Height: 1.70 m (5 ft 7 in)
- Position: Midfielder

Team information
- Current team: USV St. Anna/A.
- Number: 8

Youth career
- 1998–2008: FAC Pöls
- 2008–2012: SV Kapfenberg

Senior career*
Years	Team	Apps	(Gls)
2012–2016	Kapfenberger SV II	59	(1)
2013–2016	Kapfenberger SV	61	(1)
2016–2019	Wolfsberger AC	49	(3)
2019–2022	Grazer AK	71	(8)
2022–2023	SV Lafnitz	27	(0)
2023–2025	SV Feldbach		
2026–	USV St. Anna/A.	13	(0)
- * Club domestic league appearances and goals as of 20 June 2026

Gerald Nutz (born 25 January 1994) is an Austrian professional footballer who plays for USV St. Anna/A..

== Personal ==
He is the brother of Austrian footballer Stefan Nutz.
