= Timo Brauer =

German footballer

Personal information
- Date of birth: 30 May 1990 (age 36)
- Place of birth: Essen, West Germany
- Height: 1.77 m (5 ft 10 in)
- Position: Midfielder

Team information
- Current team: SpVg Schonnebeck
- Number: 8

Youth career
- –2002: Ballfreunde Bergeborbeck
- 2002–2003: Schwarz-Weiß Essen
- 2003–2009: Schalke 04

Senior career*
Years	Team	Apps	(Gls)
2009–2010	Rot-Weiss Essen II	15	(3)
2010–2012	Rot-Weiss Essen	80	(17)
2012–2013	Alemannia Aachen	28	(0)
2013–2014	Hamburger SV II	26	(1)
2014–2016	SV Grödig	64	(2)
2016–2019	Rot-Weiss Essen	95	(4)
2019–2022	Sportfreunde Lotte	91	(9)
2022–2024	TVD Velbert	60	(11)
2024–	SpVg Schonnebeck	0	(0)
- * Club domestic league appearances and goals as of 07:43, 4 July 2024 (UTC)

Timo Brauer (born 30 May 1990) is a German professional footballer who plays as a midfielder for SpVg Schonnebeck.
