= Robert Völkl =

Austrian footballer

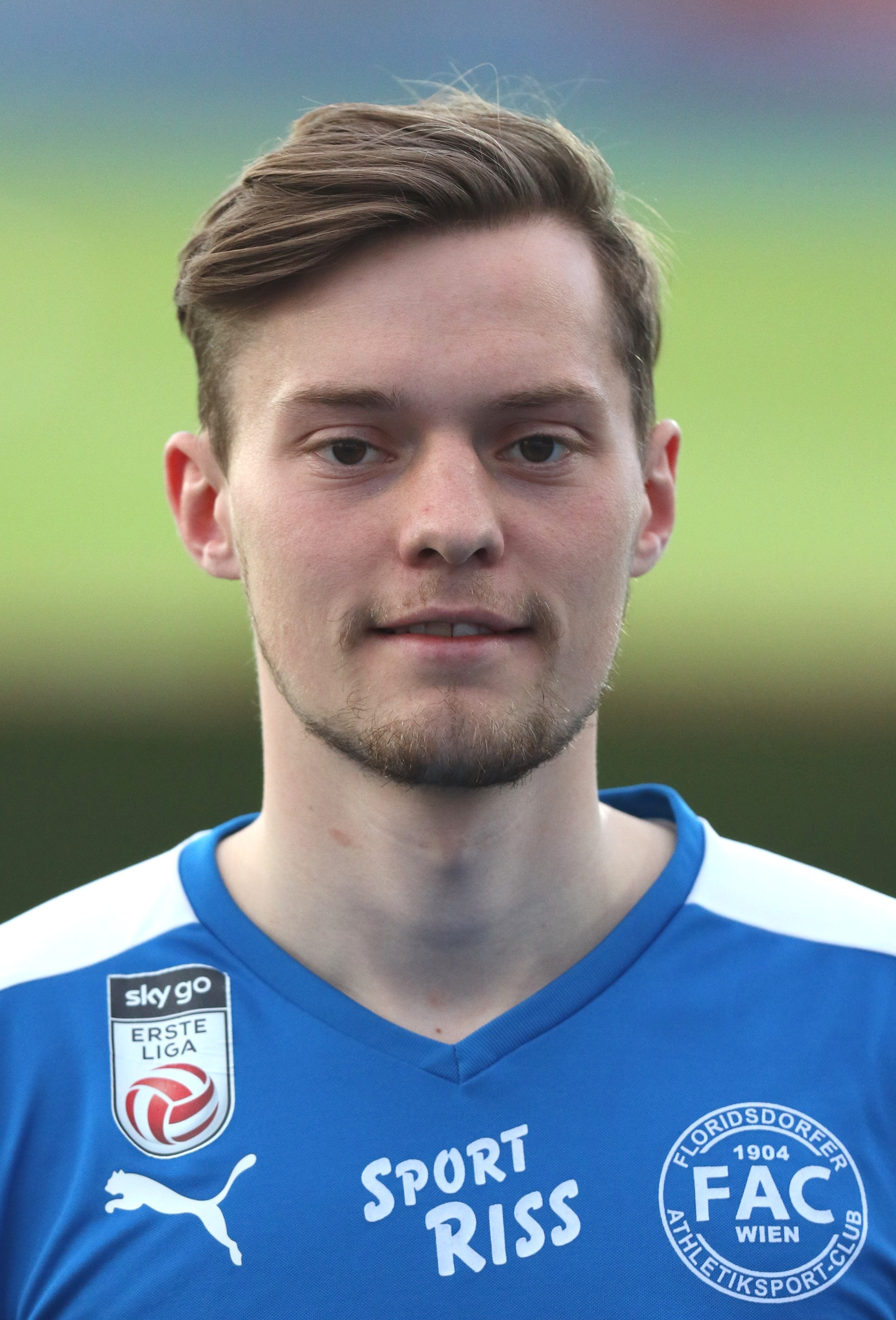
- Völkl in 2017

Personal information
- Date of birth: 12 February 1993 (age 33)
- Place of birth: Bad Aibling, Germany
- Height: 1.78 m (5 ft 10 in)
- Position: Midfielder

Team information
- Current team: SV Grödig
- Number: 6

Senior career*
| Years | Team | Apps | (Gls) |
| 2009–2014 | FC Liefering | 104 | (11) |
| 2014–2016 | SV Grödig | 32 | (1) |
| 2016–2017 | Stuttgarter Kickers | 18 | (1) |
| 2017–2018 | Floridsdorfer AC | 41 | (3) |
| 2018– | SV Grödig | 53 | (7) |
- * Club domestic league appearances and goals as of 16 October 2020

Robert Völkl (born 12 February 1993) is an Austrian professional footballer who plays as a midfielder for SV Grödig.

== Career ==
Born in Bad Aibling, Völkl has played for FC Liefering, SV Grödig, Stuttgarter Kickers and Floridsdorfer AC.
