= Florian Hart =

Austrian footballer

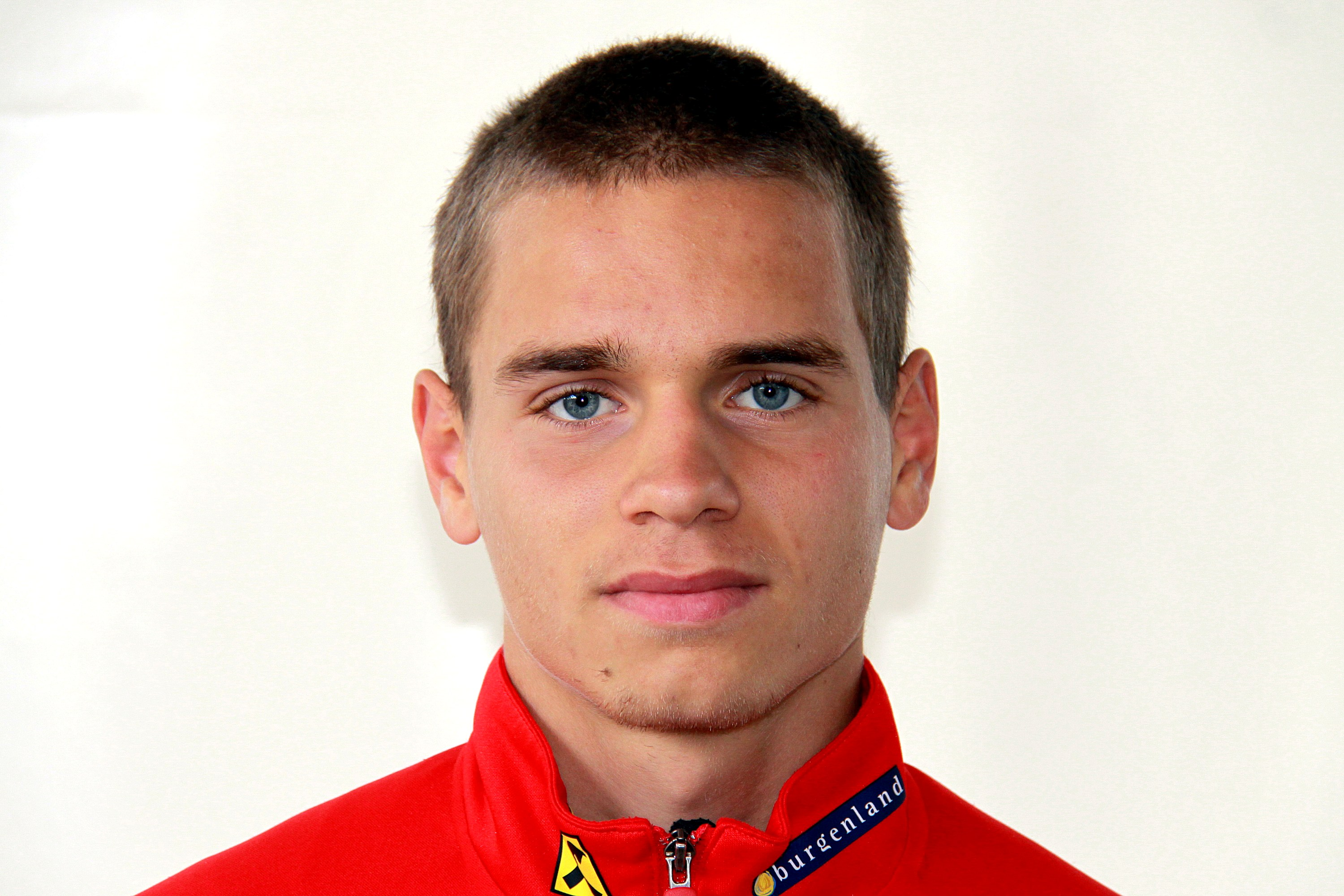

Personal information
- Date of birth: 11 May 1990 (age 36)
- Place of birth: Linz, Austria
- Height: 1.76 m (5 ft 9 1/2 in)
- Position: Right-back

Team information
- Current team: SV Mattersburg
- Number: 12

Senior career*
Years	Team	Apps	(Gls)
2006–2012	LASK Linz	75	(2)
2012–2014	SønderjyskE	46	(1)
2014–2015	SV Grödig	22	(1)
2015–2017	SV Ried	54	(1)
2017–	SV Mattersburg	47	(1)

International career
2006	Austria U-17	3	(0)
2008–2009	Austria U-19	9	(0)
2010–2011	Austria U-21	12	(1)
- * Club domestic league appearances and goals as of 1 July 2020

Florian Hart (born 11 May 1990) is an Austrian footballer who currently plays for SV Mattersburg. He formerly played for Danish Superliga side SønderjyskE.
