= Daniel Schütz =

Austrian footballer

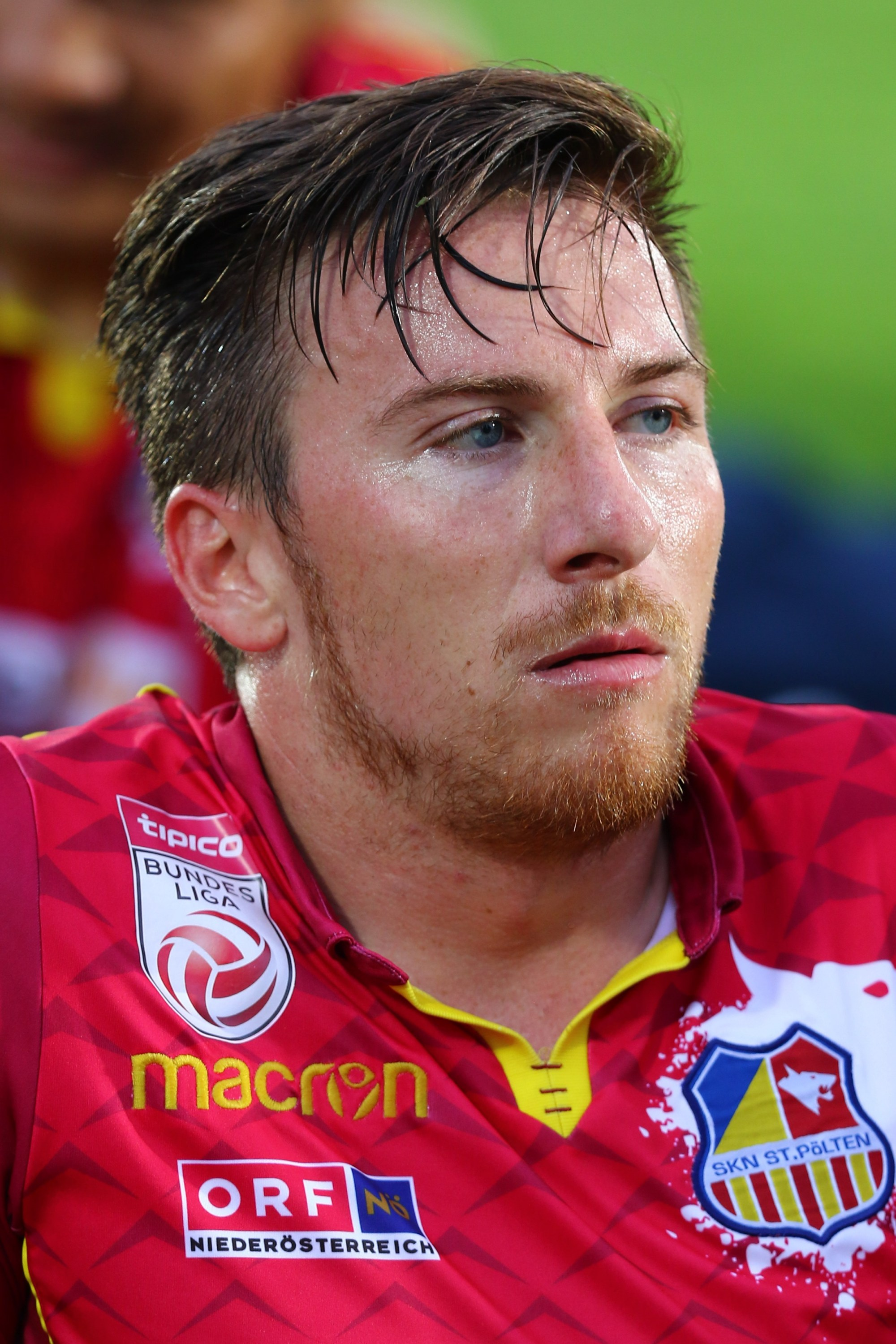

Personal information
- Date of birth: 19 June 1991 (age 35)
- Place of birth: Mooskirchen, Austria
- Height: 1.69 m (5 ft 7 in)
- Position: Midfielder

Team information
- Current team: SKN St. Pölten (assistant coach)

Youth career
- Grazer AK

Senior career*
Years	Team	Apps	(Gls)
2007–2009	Grazer AK	42	(4)
2009–2011	Rheindorf Altach	21	(4)
2011–2014	Wacker Innsbruck	85	(8)
2014–2016	SV Grödig	52	(7)
2016–2024	SKN St. Pölten	146	(16)
Total		346	(39)

International career
- Austria U17

Managerial career
- 2024: Kremser SC (assistant)
- 2024–: SKN St. Pölten (assistant)
- * Club domestic league appearances and goals

Daniel Schütz (born 19 June 1991) is an Austrian professional football coach and a former midfielder. He is an assistant coach with SKN St. Pölten.

== International career ==
Schütz has represented his native Austria at Under-17 level. Schütz appeared in the Austria U-17 team for their unsuccessful 2008 UEFA European Under-17 Football Championship qualifying round campaign.

== Coaching career ==
Upon retiring as a player, he originally moved to Kremser SC as a player and assistant coach, but one month later he was hired as an assistant coach by his former club SKN St. Pölten in August 2024.
