= Stefan Nutz =

Austrian footballer

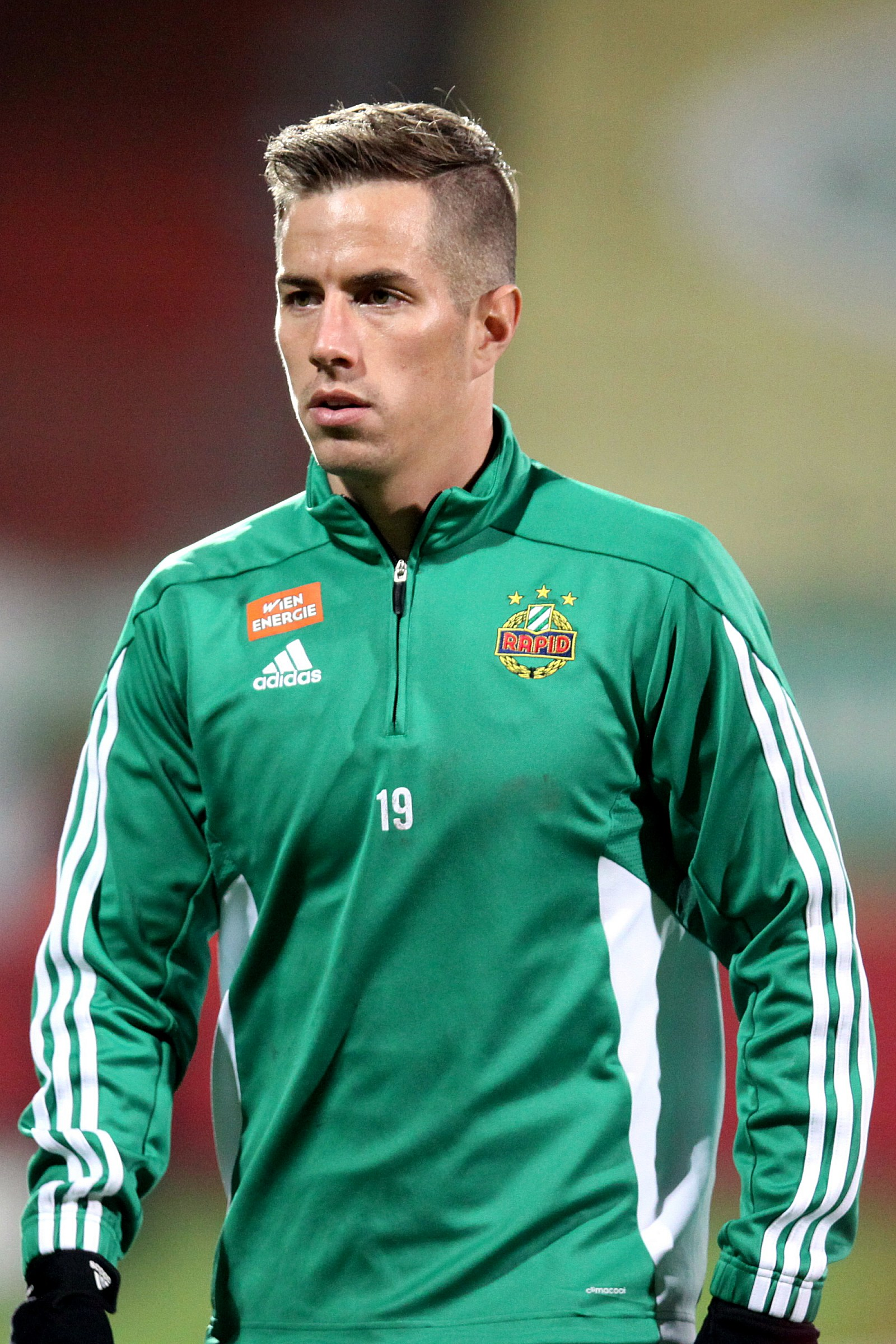

Personal information
- Date of birth: 15 February 1992 (age 34)
- Place of birth: Judenburg, Austria
- Height: 1.78 m (5 ft 10 in)
- Position: Midfielder

Team information
- Current team: SKN St. Pölten
- Number: 22

Youth career
- 1998–2006: FSC Pöls
- 2006–2008: Grazer AK
- 2008–2009: Sturm Graz

Senior career*
Years	Team	Apps	(Gls)
2009–2012	Grazer AK	66	(6)
2012–2015	SV Grödig	87	(19)
2015–2016	Rapid Wien	11	(1)
2016–2017	SV Ried	20	(2)
2017–2019	Rheindorf Altach	49	(3)
2019–2023	SV Ried	110	(14)
2023–	SKN St. Pölten	12	(0)
- * Club domestic league appearances and goals as of 26 May 2024

Stefan Nutz (born 15 February 1992) is an Austrian professional footballer who plays as a midfielder for SKN St. Pölten.

== Career ==
On 7 July 2019, Nutz joined SV Ried on a one-year contract with an option for one further year.

On 14 July 2023, Nutz signed a contract until 2025 with SKN St. Pölten, effective 1 September 2023. As he was recovering from a serious knee injury at the time of the signing, he was not immediately included on the club's squad.

== Personal ==
He is the brother of footballer Gerald Nutz.
