= Miroslav Bojčeski =

Macedonian footballer

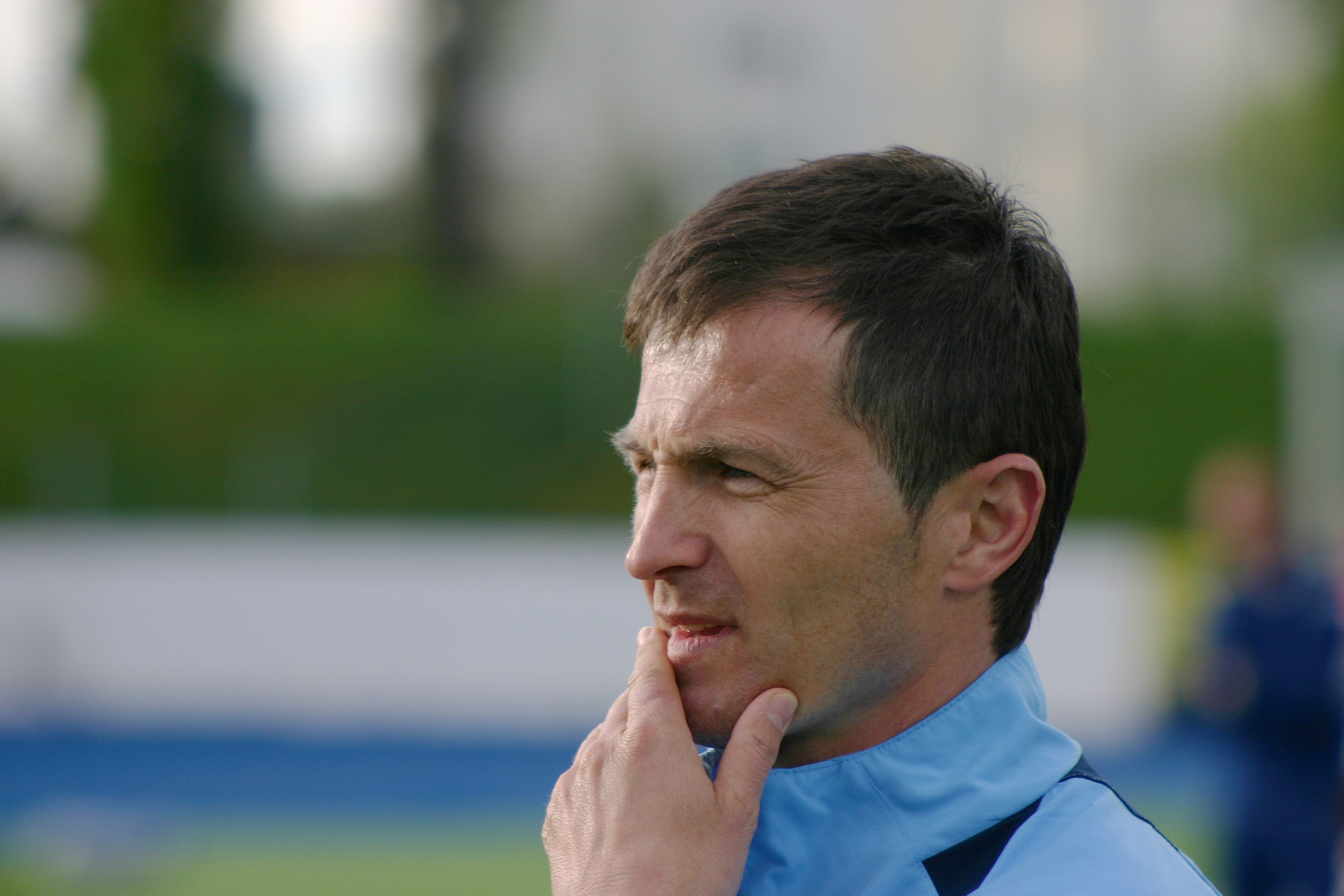

Personal information
- Date of birth: 30 December 1968 (age 57)
- Place of birth: Skopje, SFR Yugoslavia
- Position: Midfielder

Senior career*
Years	Team	Apps	(Gls)
1995–1996	FK Vardar		
1996–1998	FK Makedonija Gjorče Petrov		
1998–2000	FC Braunau	52	(0)
2000–2003	PSV SW Salzburg	45	(0)
2003–2008	SV Grödig	42	(1)
2009–2010	SV Friedburg		
- * Club domestic league appearances and goals

Miroslav Bojčeski (born 30 December 1968) is a retired Macedonian footballer who played as a midfielder.
