= Robert Strobl =

Austrian footballer

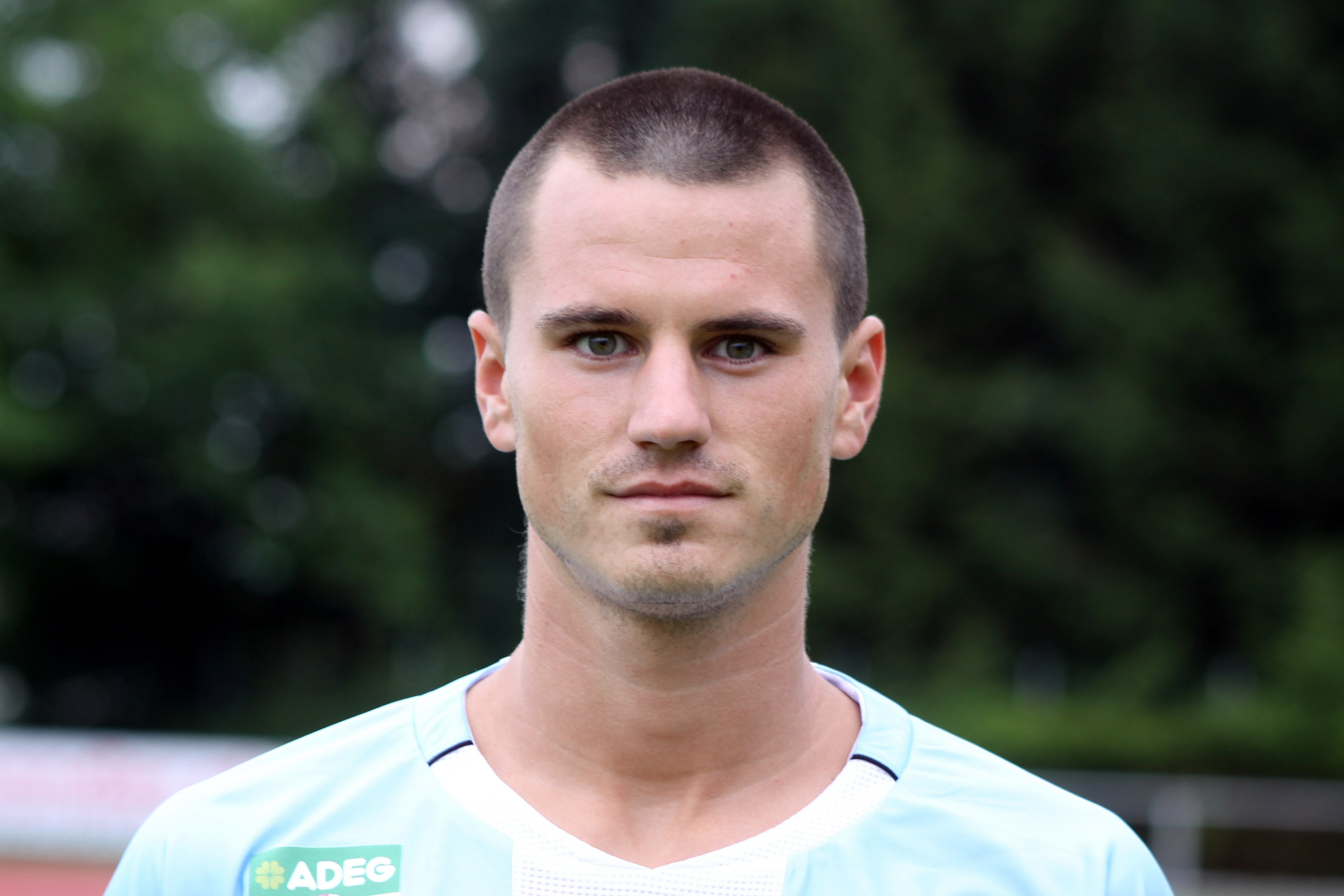

Personal information
- Full name: Robert Strobl
- Date of birth: 24 October 1985 (age 41)
- Place of birth: Güssing, Austria
- Height: 1.80 m (5 ft 11 in)
- Position: Defender

Team information
- Current team: SV Grödig
- Number: 12

Senior career*
Years	Team	Apps	(Gls)
2007–2009	SC Weiz	54	(8)
2009–2012	TSV Hartberg	95	(2)
2013–	SV Grödig	91	(4)
- * Club domestic league appearances and goals as of 06:19, 27 August 2016 (UTC)

Robert Strobl (born 24 October 1985) is an Austrian footballer who plays for SV Grödig.
