= Untersberg-Arena =

Football stadium in Grödig, Austria

Coordinates: 47°44′36″N 13°02′52″E

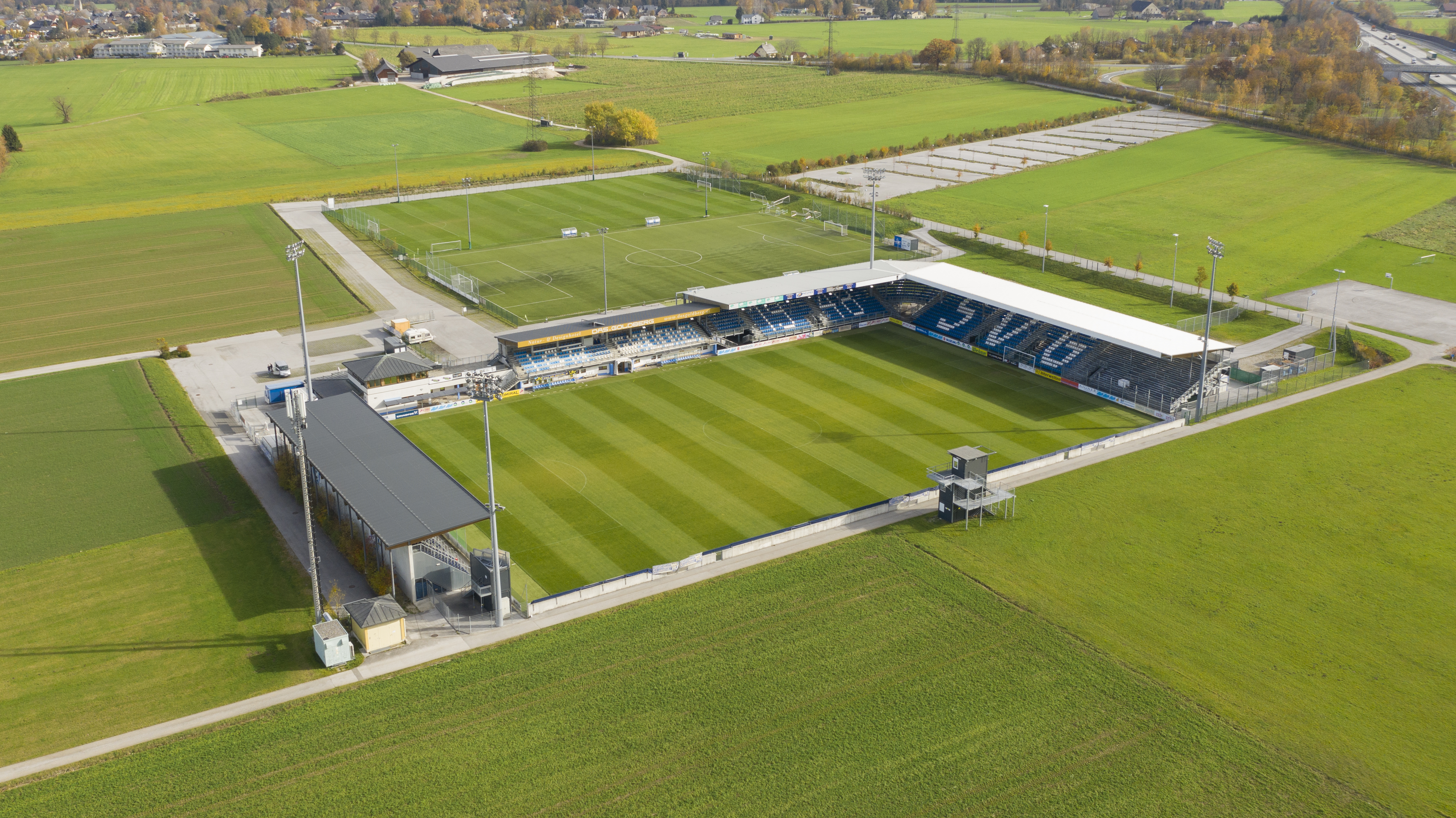
- Interactive map of Untersberg-Arena
- Former names: Sportanlage Grödig
- Location: Grödig, Austria
- Capacity: 4,638

Construction
- Opened: 1989
- Renovated: 2008
- Expanded: 2008, 2010–2011, 2013

Tenants
- SV Grödig; FC Liefering

Untersberg-Arena is a football stadium in Grödig, Austria. It is home to SV Grödig and FC Liefering.

== History ==
After SV Grödig was promoted to the Austrian Bundesliga in 2013, the capacity was expanded to the current capacity of 4,128.
