= Yordy Reyna =

Peruvian footballer (born 1993)

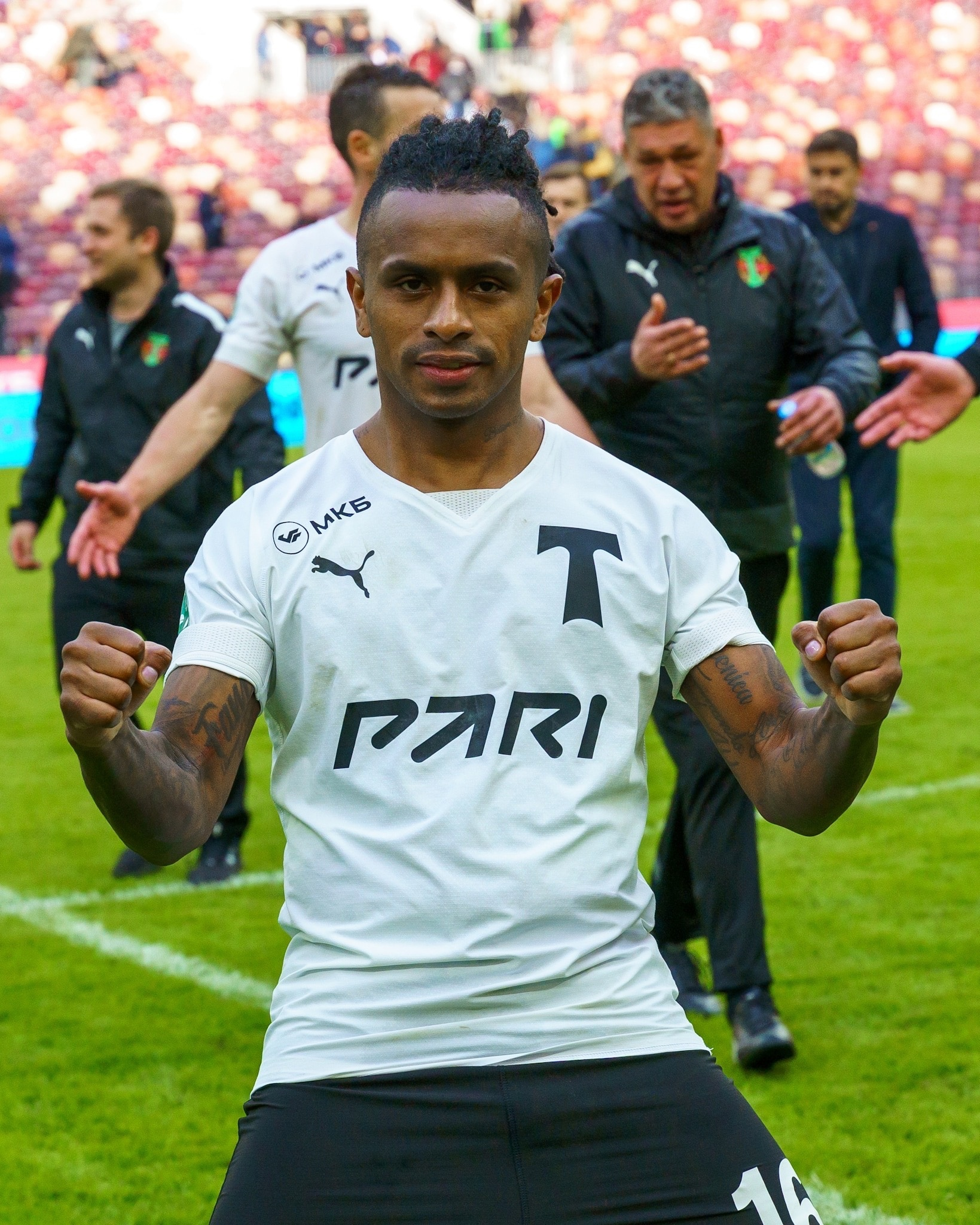
- Reyna with Torpedo Moscow in 2023

Personal information
- Full name: José Yordy Reyna Serna
- Date of birth: 17 September 1993 (age 33)
- Place of birth: Chiclayo, Peru
- Height: 1.69 m (5 ft 7 in)
- Position: Forward

Team information
- Current team: Rodina Moscow
- Number: 10

Youth career
- –2010: Alianza Lima

Senior career*
| Years | Team | Apps | (Gls) |
| 2011–2013 | Alianza Lima | 49 | (12) |
| 2013–2016 | Red Bull Salzburg | 22 | (3) |
| 2013–2014 | → Liefering | 18 | (1) |
| 2014–2015 | → Grödig (loan) | 19 | (11) |
| 2015 | → RB Leipzig (loan) | 13 | (1) |
| 2017–2020 | Vancouver Whitecaps FC | 77 | (19) |
| 2020–2021 | D.C. United | 23 | (4) |
| 2022–2023 | Charlotte FC | 19 | (3) |
| 2023–2025 | Torpedo Moscow | 33 | (4) |
| 2024–2025 | → Rodina Moscow (loan) | 29 | (7) |
| 2025– | Rodina Moscow | 42 | (7) |

International career^{‡}
| 2012–2013 | Peru U20 | 9 | (5) |
| 2013–2019 | Peru | 32 | (2) |
Medal record
Men's football
Representing Peru
Copa América
| Third place | 2015 |
- * Club domestic league appearances and goals as of 7 November 2026 ‡ National team caps and goals as of 18 November 2025

José Yordy Reyna Serna (Spanish pronunciation: [ˈʝoɾði ˈrejna]; born 17 September 1993) is a Peruvian professional footballer who plays as a striker for Rodina Moscow.

== Early life ==
Born in the city of Chiclayo, he moved to Lima at the age of 14. He gave such a good impression in his first try-out for Alianza Lima that he was given a place in the youth teams of the club. He continued to play well enough and this allowed him to rise through the ranks to the first team. His ability to create plays with short and long passes, score crucial goals and evade defenders with ease had earned him comparisons with his childhood idol Jefferson Farfán, a former Peruvian international and star with FC Schalke 04 in the German Bundesliga.

== Club career ==
=== Alianza Lima ===
In March 2011, Reyna was promoted to the Alianza Lima first team after a great season in which he scored seven goals in the Torneo de Promoción y Reserva (the reserve league for first division teams) and the 2011 U-20 Copa Libertadores. He made his league debut in the Peruvian First Division on 27 August 2011 in Round 20 at home against Inti Gas Deportes. He came on in the 90th minute for Paolo Hurtado to wrap up the 4–2 win in Matute. In his second match he was given more playing time as he came on in the 62nd minute for Joazhiño Arroe, but he could not help his side overturn the 2–0 defeat away to León de Huánuco. He only managed two league appearances in the 2011 season. In the 2012 season, he won a first team place after the departure of many players. He scored his first league goal against Sport Boys on 18 May 2012, in the 49th minute of play. He would go on to score five more times for his club side that season and for his efforts he won the award for Jugador Revelacion (Breakthrough Player) of the 2012 season. In the 2013 season, Reyna scored six goals, including the game-winning goal against Universitario de Deportes in the Peruvian Clásico on 15 March.

=== Red Bull Salzburg ===
In the mid-2013 Reyna signed with the Austrian club Red Bull Salzburg for a rumoured transfer fee of 2 million euros. Reyna made his debut for Red Bull Salzburg in a friendly pre-season match where he had a spectacular performance and even scored the game winner. Since his debut he has been loaned to fellow Austrian clubs FC Liefering and SV Grödig.

In January 2015 he joined German club RB Leipzig on loan for the rest of the season.

=== Vancouver Whitecaps FC ===
In January 2017 Reyna joined the Canadian club Vancouver Whitecaps FC. He injured his foot during a preseason friendly and missed the first four months of the MLS season. He made his club debut on 1 July 2017, and scored his first goal, a game winner against New York City FC, a week later.

=== D.C. United ===
On 19 September 2020, Reyna was traded by the Whitecaps to D.C. United in exchange for $400,000 in 2021 General Allocation Money. He made his debut on 27 September 2020, playing 68 minutes in a 0–2 loss against the New England Revolution. Following the 2021 season, Reyna was released by D.C. United.

=== Charlotte FC ===
On 17 December 2021, Reyna signed as a free agent for Charlotte FC ahead of their inaugural MLS season in 2022.

On 17 February 2023, Charlotte FC waived Reyna, as they exercised his contract buyout.

=== Torpedo Moscow ===
On 20 February 2023, Reyna signed a contract with Russian Premier League club Torpedo Moscow for six months, with an option to extend for an additional year. On 7 June 2023, Reyna extended his contract with Torpedo until June 2026. On 6 August 2025, Torpedo Moscow announced the termination of the contract with Reyna by mutual agreement.

== International career ==
=== Peru under-20 team ===
Reyna was a part of a 22-man roster for the Peru national under-20 football team that played in the 2013 South American Youth Championship held in Argentina. Playing in Group B, he scored against the Uruguay national under-20 football team in a 3–3 draw and against the Brazil national under-20 football team in a 2–0 win. After progressing from the group stage and into the hexagonal final stage, Reyna scored in a 1–3 loss against the Paraguay national under-20 football team and he scored twice against the Ecuador national under-20 football team in a 3–2 win. Unfortunately, Peru crashed out of the tournament with five points. However, Reyna earned 3rd place in the goal-scoring standings with five goals behind Nicolás Castillo and Nicolás López of Chile and Uruguay respectively.

=== Peru national football team ===
On 22 March 2013, Reyna was selected for his first senior international game and played in a 1–0 WCQ victory against Chile in the Clásico del Pacífico rivalry after substituting Peru captain Claudio Pizarro in the 79th minute of the match. On 26 March 2013, just four days later, he started in the friendly against Trinidad and Tobago and scored his first international goal in the 41st minute after finishing a well played cross from Irven Ávila. On 1 June 2013, Reyna scored his second international goal in a 2–1 friendly win over Panama.

== Career statistics ==
=== Club ===
As of match played 7 November 2026

Appearances and goals by club, season and competition
| Club | Season | League | | | National cup | | Continental | | Other | | Total | |
| Club | Season | Division | Apps | Goals | Apps | Goals | Apps | Goals | Apps | Goals | Apps | Goals |
|---|---|---|---|---|---|---|---|---|---|---|---|---|
| Alianza Lima | 2011 | Peruvian Primera División | 2 | 0 | — | | — | | — | | 2 | 0 |
| Alianza Lima | 2012 | Peruvian Primera División | 29 | 6 | — | | — | | — | | 29 | 6 |
| Alianza Lima | 2013 | Peruvian Primera División | 18 | 6 | — | | — | | — | | 18 | 6 |
| Alianza Lima | Total | | 49 | 12 | 0 | 0 | 0 | 0 | 0 | 0 | 49 | 12 |
| Red Bull Salzburg | 2013–14 | Bundesliga | 4 | 0 | 1 | 0 | 4 (Note: Three appearances in UEFA Europa League and one appearance in UEFA Champions League) | 0 | — | | 9 | 0 |
| Red Bull Salzburg | 2015–16 | Bundesliga | 16 | 3 | 3 | 0 | 3 (Note: Two appearances in UEFA Europa League and one appearance in UEFA Champions League) | 0 | — | | 22 | 3 |
| Red Bull Salzburg | 2016–17 | Bundesliga | 2 | 0 | 2 | 0 | 1 (Note: Appearance(s) in UEFA Champions League) | 0 | — | | 5 | 0 |
| Red Bull Salzburg | Total | | 22 | 3 | 6 | 0 | 8 | 0 | 0 | 0 | 36 | 3 |
| FC Liefering (loan) | 2013–14 | First League | 18 | 1 | — | | — | | — | | 18 | 1 |
| SV Grödig (loan) | 2014–15 | Bundesliga | 19 | 11 | 3 | 1 | 4 (Note: Appearance(s) in UEFA Europa League) | 0 | — | | 26 | 12 |
| RB Leipzig (loan) | 2014–15 | 2. Bundesliga | 13 | 1 | 1 | 0 | — | | — | | 14 | 1 |
| Vancouver Whitecaps FC | 2017 | MLS | 18 | 6 | — | | — | | 3 (Note: Appearance(s) in MLS Cup Playoffs) | 0 | 21 | 6 |
| Vancouver Whitecaps FC | 2018 | MLS | 26 | 6 | 3 | 1 | — | | — | | 29 | 7 |
| Vancouver Whitecaps FC | 2019 | MLS | 25 | 7 | 2 | 0 | — | | — | | 27 | 7 |
| Vancouver Whitecaps FC | 2020 | MLS | 8 | 1 | — | | — | | 1 (Note: Appearance(s) in MLS is Back Tournament) | 0 | 9 | 1 |
| Vancouver Whitecaps FC | Total | | 77 | 20 | 5 | 1 | 0 | 0 | 4 | 0 | 86 | 21 |
| D.C. United | 2020 | MLS | 5 | 0 | — | | — | | — | | 5 | 0 |
| D.C. United | 2021 | MLS | 18 | 4 | — | | — | | — | | 18 | 4 |
| D.C. United | Total | | 23 | 4 | 0 | 0 | 0 | 0 | 0 | 0 | 23 | 4 |
| Charlotte FC | 2022 | MLS | 19 | 3 | 2 | 1 | — | | — | | 21 | 4 |
| Torpedo Moscow | 2022–23 | Russian Premier League | 12 | 1 | 0 | 0 | — | | — | | 12 | 1 |
| Torpedo Moscow | 2023–24 | Russian First League | 21 | 3 | 1 | 0 | — | | — | | 22 | 3 |
| Torpedo Moscow | 2025–26 | Russian First League | 0 | 0 | 0 | 0 | — | | — | | 0 | 0 |
| Torpedo Moscow | Total | | 33 | 4 | 1 | 0 | 0 | 0 | 0 | 0 | 34 | 4 |
| Rodina Moscow (loan) | 2024–25 | Russian First League | 29 | 7 | 0 | 0 | — | | — | | 29 | 7 |
| Rodina Moscow | 2025–26 | Russian First League | 28 | 7 | 0 | 0 | — | | — | | 28 | 7 |
| Rodina Moscow | 2026–27 | Russian Premier League | 14 | 0 | 3 | 0 | — | | — | | 17 | 0 |
| Rodina Moscow | Total | | 71 | 14 | 3 | 0 | 0 | 0 | 0 | 0 | 74 | 14 |
| Career total | | | 344 | 73 | 21 | 3 | 12 | 0 | 4 | 0 | 381 | 76 |

=== International ===
As of match played 12 November 2025

Appearances and goals by national team and year
| National team | Year | Apps | Goals |
|---|---|---|---|
| Peru | 2013 | 6 | 2 |
| Peru | 2014 | 2 | 0 |
| Peru | 2015 | 9 | 0 |
| Peru | 2016 | 0 | 0 |
| Peru | 2017 | 1 | 0 |
| Peru | 2018 | 4 | 0 |
| Peru | 2019 | 6 | 0 |
| Peru | 2022 | 2 | 0 |
| Peru | 2025 | 1 | 0 |
| Total | | 31 | 2 |

| # | Date | Venue | Opponent | Score | Result | Competition |
|---|---|---|---|---|---|---|
| 1. | 26 March 2013 | Lima, Peru | Trinidad and Tobago | 3–0 | Win | Friendly |
| 2. | 1 June 2013 | Panama City, Panama | Panama | 2–1 | Win | Friendly |

== Honors ==
Red Bull Salzburg

- Austrian Football Bundesliga: 2013–14, 2015–16, 2016–17
- Austrian Cup: 2013–14, 2015–16, 2016–17

Individual

- Jugador Revelación (Breakthrough Player) of the 2012 Peruvian First Division
