= Boris Hüttenbrenner =

Austrian footballer

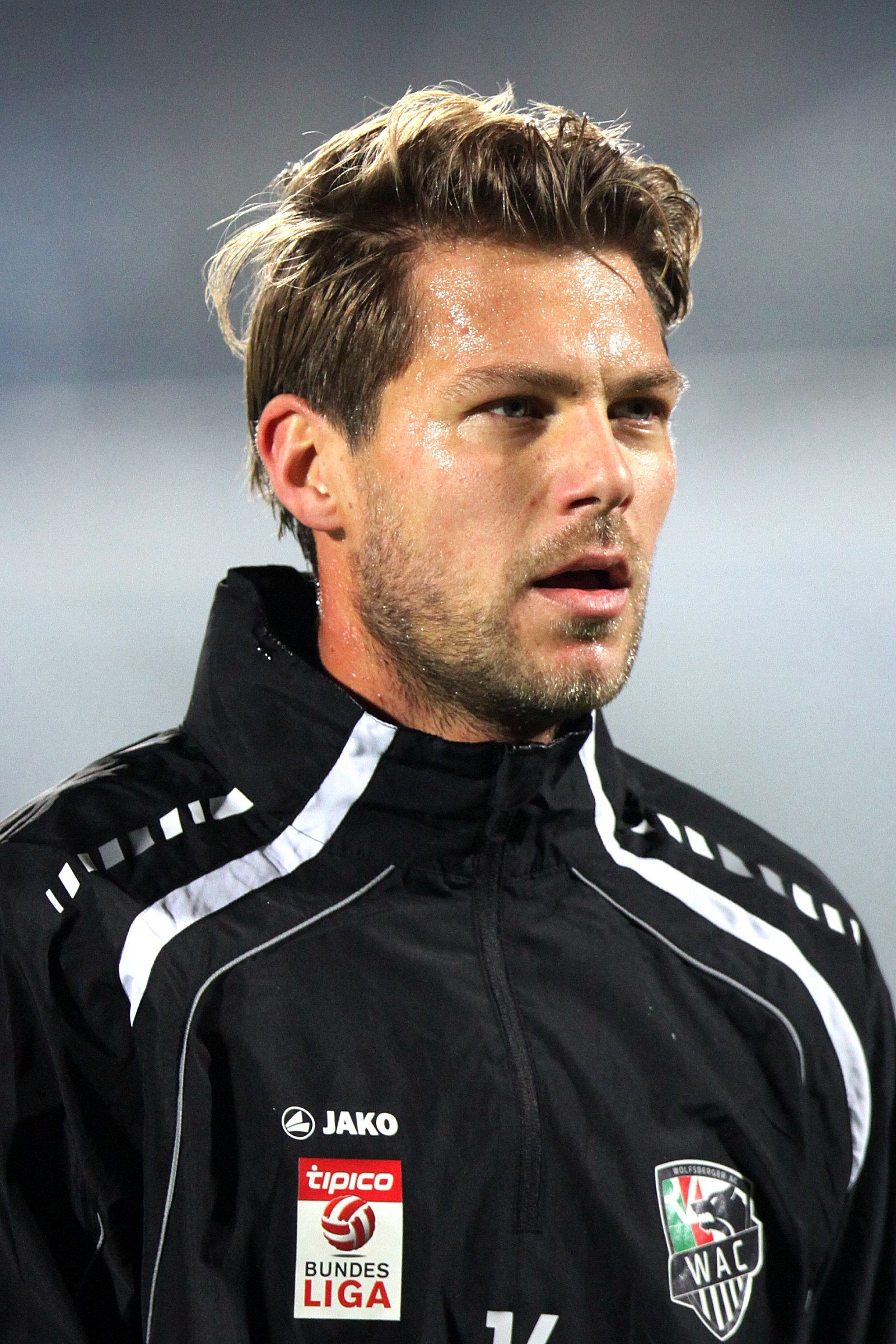

Personal information
- Date of birth: September 23, 1985 (age 41)
- Place of birth: Leoben, Austria
- Height: 1.88 m (6 ft 2 in)
- Position: Midfielder

Senior career*
| Years | Team | Apps | (Gls) |
| 2003–2008 | Leoben | 127 | (16) |
| 2008–2012 | Kapfenberg | 89 | (6) |
| 2012–2013 | Austria Klagenfurt | 25 | (8) |
| 2013–2018 | Wolfsberger AC | 130 | (9) |
- * Club domestic league appearances and goals

Boris Hüttenbrenner (born September 23, 1985) is a former Austrian professional association football player. He played as a midfielder.
