= Grödig =

- Municipality
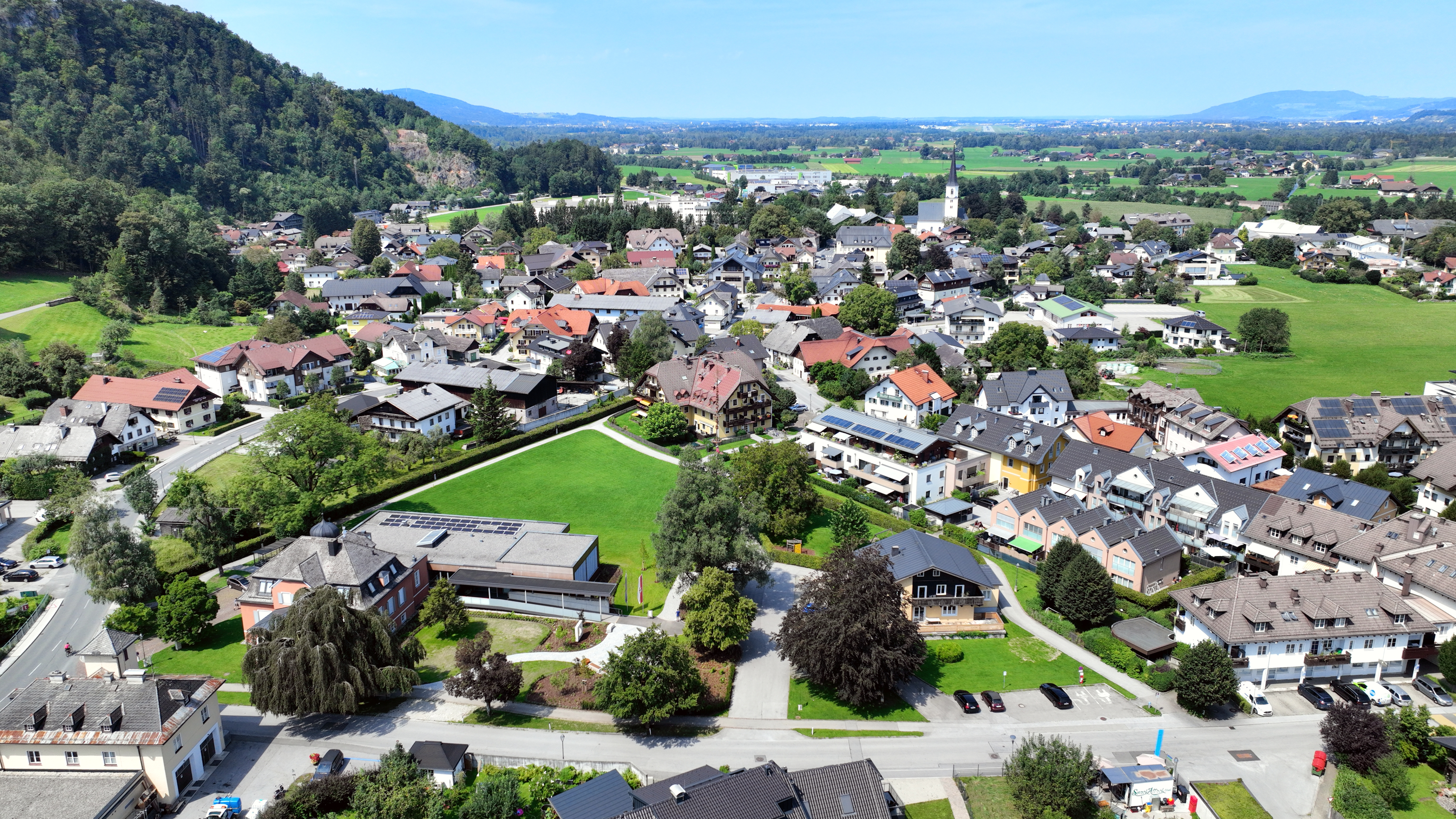
- South-southeast view of Grödig

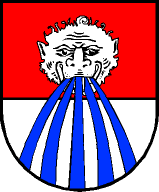
- Coat of arms

- Location within Austria Grödig (Austria)
- Coordinates: 47°42′00″N 13°01′00″E
- Country: Austria
- State: Salzburg
- District: Salzburg-Umgebung

Government
  - Mayor: Herbert Schober (Ind.)

Area
  - Total: 23.07 km^{2} (8.91 sq mi)
- Elevation: 446 m (1,463 ft)

Population (2018-01-01)
  - Total: 7,262
  - Density: 314.8/km^{2} (815.3/sq mi)
- Time zone: UTC+1 (CET)
  - Summer (DST): UTC+2 (CEST)
- Postal code: 5082
- Area code: 06246
- Vehicle registration: SL
- Website: www.groedig.at

Grödig is a market town of Salzburg-Umgebung District in the state of Salzburg in Austria.

== Geography ==
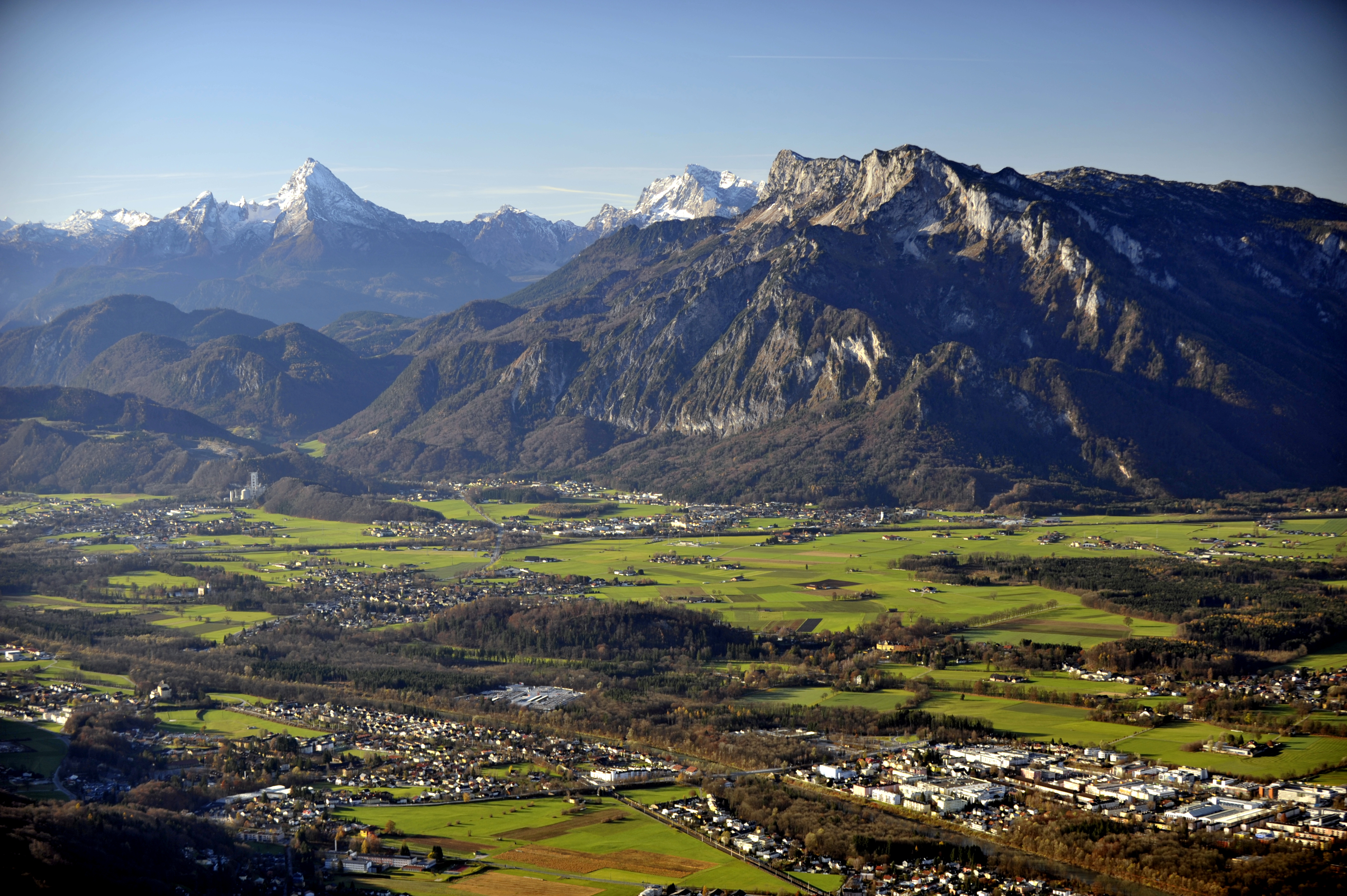
Salzburg basin and Untersberg

Grödig is located south of the Salzburg city limits in the historic Flachgau region, near the border with Bavaria, Germany. The market town is situated on the southwestern edge of the Salzburg basin at the foot of the Berchtesgaden Alps. The peaks of the nearby Untersberg massif as well as its numerous pit caves are a protected area and a popular destination for daytrippers. A cable car leads up to the Geiereck spur at an altitude of 1,776 m (5,827 ft). The market town joined the European Climate Alliance in 1990.

Grödig is home to the multinational access control and security company SKIDATA and the Mozartkugel confection manufacturer Mirabell (part of Mondelez International). It has access to the Tauern Autobahn at the Salzburg-Süd junction.

The municipal area comprises the cadastral communities Glanegg and Grödig. Subdivisions are: Eichet, Glanegg, Grödig, Fürstenbrunn, and Sankt Leonhard.

== History ==
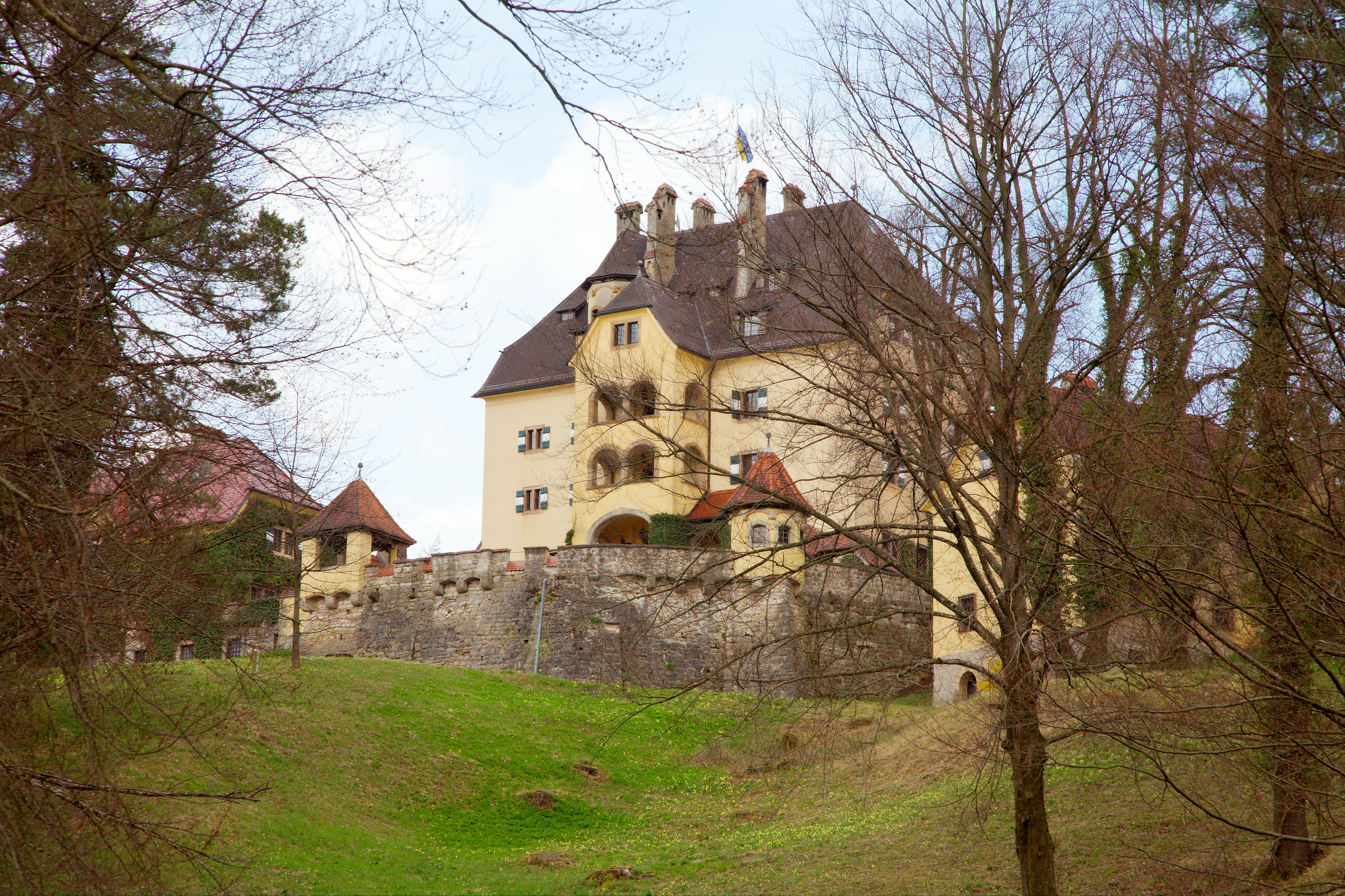
Glanegg Castle

A church at Crethica was first mentioned in a 790 deed issued by Bishop Arno of Salzburg. The name is possibly related to Friulian: cret, "rock", "crevice" and may date back to the ancient times of the Roman city of Iuvavum, when limestone was mined in the Untersberg area. Then part of the Noricum province, the local population was already Christianised by Saint Severinus (d. 482), when Bavarian peasants began to settle the area.

The Grödig estates were administrated by the Salzburg St Peter's Abbey. The monks had an artificial watercourse (Almkanal) built, running from the Berchtesgadener Ache via Grödig to the Salzburg city centre, including a passage through the Mönchsberg hill. About 1350, Glanegg Castle appeared as administrative seat of the Salzburg prince-archbishops. Under the rule of Leonhard von Keutschach (1495–1519) and Mark Sittich von Hohenems (1612–1619), it was rebuilt as a tower castle and later became part of the Salzburg fortress system. Upon the secularisation of the prince-archbishopric in 1803, the building was purchased by Elector Ferdinand III and remained a private property up to today.

During the Napoleonic War of the Fifth Coalition in 1809 Joachim Haspinger, one of the leaders of the Tyrolean Rebellion, sparked local uprisings against the French forces which finally were suppressed in November.

== Politics ==
Seats in the municipal assembly (Gemeinderat) as of 2014 local elections:

- Austrian People's Party (ÖVP) and Independents: 15
- Social Democratic Party of Austria (SPÖ): 6
- Freedom Party of Austria (FPÖ): 2
- Green Alternative Citizens' List: 2

== Sport ==
The football team SV Grödig competed in the Austrian Football Bundesliga until 2015–16.

== Notable people ==
- Harald Krassnitzer (born 1960), actor
- The Austrian actor and philanthropist Karlheinz Böhm died in Grödig in 2014.
