= SV Grödig =

- Full name: Sportverein Grödig
- Founded: 20 March 1948; 78 years ago
- Ground: THE GOLDBERG Stadium
- Capacity: 4,132
- Chairman: Mag. Hannes Codalonga
- Manager: Arsim Deliu
- League: Regionalliga North
- 2025–26: Salzburger Liga, 1st of 16 (promoted)
- Website: https://sv-groedig.at/
Home colours	Away colours

Sportverein Grödig is an Austrian association football club from Grödig. The team currently competes in the Austrian Regionalliga North, the third tier of Austrian football.

Grödig were relegated from the Austrian Bundesliga at the end of the 2015–16 season; however, they dropped down two levels to the Austrian Regional League West due to financial problems.

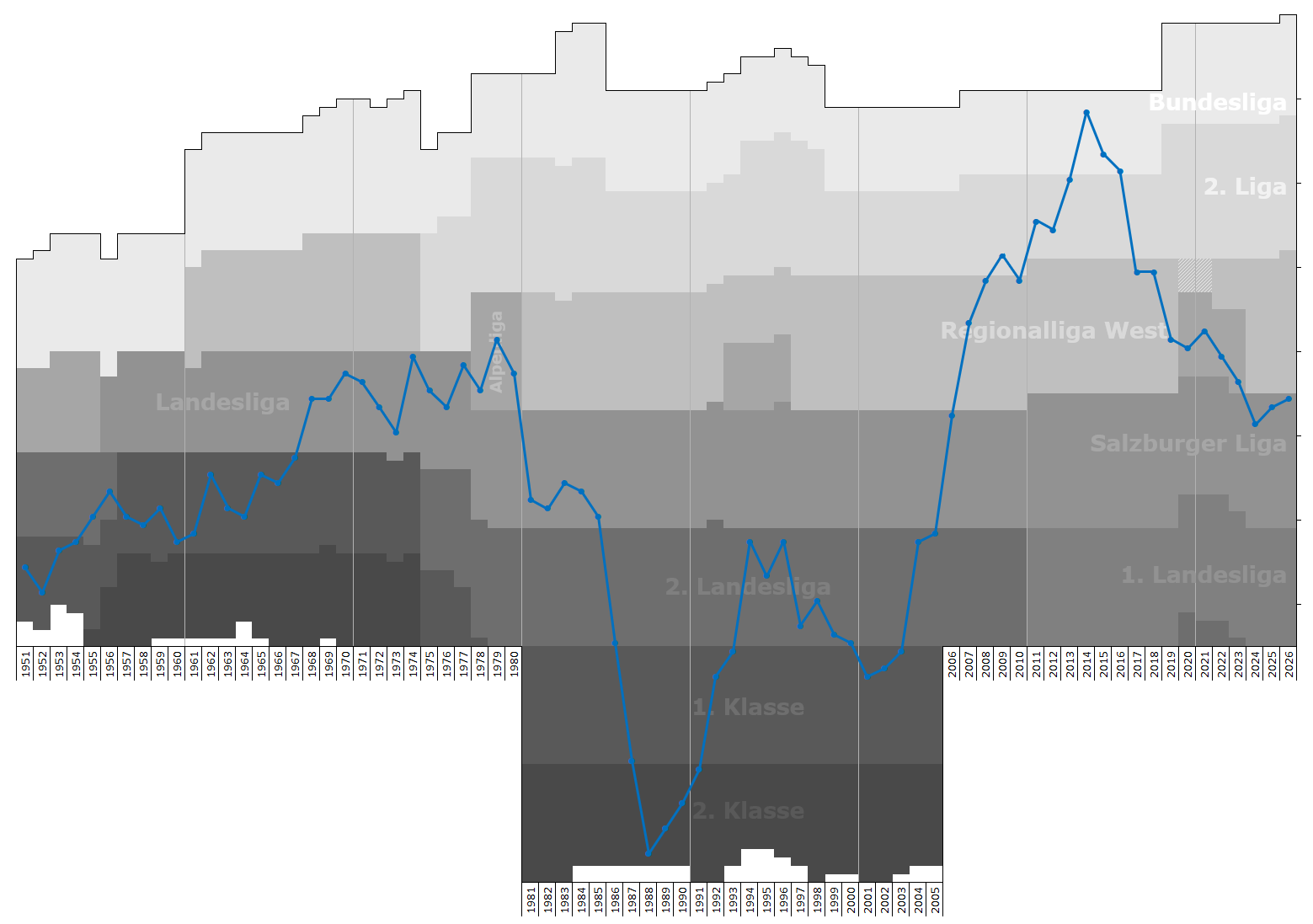
Historical chart of SV Grödig league performance

== History ==
The club was founded on 20 March 1948 as Union Sportklub Grödig by German-speaking refugees living in the Schwabenlager Grödig Displaced Persons camp. After being admitted to the Salzburg Football Association, USK Grödig was permitted to compete in the 2. Klasse B in the 1949–50 season. Like the other Danube Swabian clubs - Danubia Salzburg and Victoria Salzburg - they played on a non-competitive basis, as Danube Swabians were classed as foreigners, and ÖFB regulations at the time limited the number of non-Austrian players in a team.

On 4 September 1955, the club adopted their current name, SV Grödig.

In 1967, SV Grödig were promoted to the third-tier Salzburger Liga.

In 1977, the club qualified for the newly-formed third-tier Alpenliga, having finished runners up to ASK Salzburg in the fourth tier Salzburger Liga. That same year, Grödig reached the second round of the Austrian Cup, before being knocked out by Grazer AK.

After several years of relegation, the club managed to stabilise in the Landesliga and 2. Landesliga in the early 1990s.

Beginning in the 2002–03 season, Grödig won three league titles in four seasons and were promoted to the Regionalliga West, returning to third-tier competition for the first time since 1980.

=== Promotion to the First League ===
The club appointed former Austrian international Edi Glieder as its new head coach prior to the 2006–07 season, in which they achieved sixth place. The next season, Grödig brought in Heimo Pfeifenberger as the new head coach. They ultimately secured promotion to the First League on 21 May 2008, following a 2–2 draw versus FC Hard. Despite Pfeifenberger's success of promotion and finishing eighth at the end of the autumn season, then-president Toni Haas could no longer envision "a positive and promising collaboration" with the coach, dismissing him on 12 December 2008. Miroslav Bojčeski, who previously coached SV Austria Salzburg, was appointed as his successor. He was unable to avoid relegation, as Grödig finished tenth and were relegated back to the Regionalliga West. Following relegation, reserve team coach Michael Brandner took charge. He announced his resignation in March 2010. Pfeifenberger was re-appointed head coach a month later.

=== Promotion and First League title ===
The 2009–10 season saw Grödig return to the First League at the first time of asking. They defeated First Vienna across a two-legged relegation play-off, but were awarded automatic promotion as SK Austria Kärnten and FC Dornbirn were denied a license. Two major signings in Herwig Drechsel and Matthias Hattenberger, were brought to the club. Grödig also brought in Andreas Schranz and Diego Viana during the January transfer window.

On 3 May 2013, SV Grödig would win their first ever First League title, defeating Austria Lustenau 2–1.

=== Promotion to the Bundesliga and European football ===
In their debut Bundesliga season, Grödig would finish third behind Red Bull Salzburg and Rapid Wien, securing qualification to the UEFA Europa League. Head coach Adi Hütter was signed by Red Bull Salzburg, and was replaced by Michael Baur. He continued the successful run; Grödig defeated Čukarički of Serbia 5–2 in the second qualifying round, but were ultimately eliminated by Zimbru Chișinău on away goals rule.

After finishing sixth in the 2014–15 autumn season, German scrap dealer Scholz ended its seven-year partnership with the club, as the company withdrew from all sports sponsorships. Top scorer Yordy Reyna would sign for RB Leipzig in the 2015 January transfer window, bringing in Lucas Venuto on loan from FC Liefering as a replacement.

=== Relegation from the Bundesliga ===
The club appointed Peter Schöttel and Martin Hiden as new joint head-coaches for the 2015–16 season. Numerous key players left the club, and were replaced by younger players, including Christian Derflinger, Dominik Baumgartner, Alexander Schlager, Bernd Gschweidl, and Martin Rasner, all of whom had featured for the Austrian U19, U20, and U21 teams.

On 15 October 2015, Helmut Gruber was appointed club president. Gruber was the managing director of the Salzburg-based advertising agency G.A. Service GmbH. Toni Haas had stepped down from presidency in 2012, but remained available in an advisory capacity whilst the club sought a new president, culminating in his appointment as Honorary President for life.

After a satisfactory first half to the 2015–16 season, seeing them into 2016 in sixth place, Lucas Venuto was sold to Austria Wien. This caused a major drop in form in the second half of the season, only recording two wins and three draws, resulting in a 10th place finish and relegation back to the First League. However, SV Grödig declined their First League license, instead choosing to play in the Regionalliga West and withdrawing from professional football. Peter Schöttel also announced that he would be leaving the club, as his contract was only valid provided the club remained in the Bundesliga.

=== Return to Regionalliga ===
Following the withdrawal, Grödig returned to the Regionalliga for the 2016–17 season. Having finished second in their first two seasons, the club began to fluctuate between sixth and tenth place, eventually resulting in relegation to the fourth tier Salzburger Liga at the end of the 2022–23 season.

== Colours ==
The club's colours are dark blue and white.

== Current squad ==
As of 9 September 2026

Note: Flags indicate national team as defined under FIFA eligibility rules; some limited exceptions apply. Players may hold more than one non-FIFA nationality.

No.	Pos.	Nation	Player
1	GK	AUT	Vlado Grabovica
2	DF	GER	Felix Klegraefe
4	DF	SRB	Gavrilo Fonjga
5	DF	ITA	Matthias Theiner
6	MF	AUT	Robert Völkl (captain)
7	MF	SRB	Nemanja Zikić
8	MF	AUT	Julian Aumayr
9	MF	AUT	Alexander Schwaighofer
10	MF	GER	Sebastian Hölzl
11	MF	GER	Orlando-Rahim Azzef
12	DF	AUT	Benjamin Sammer
13	MF	AUT	Lukas Hiermann

No.	Pos.	Nation	Player
14	DF	AUT	Thomas Niedermüller
17	MF	AUT	David Hillebrand
18	MF	AUT	Manuel Fraunhuber
20	MF	GER	Daniel Leitz
21	FW	BIH	Andrej Lazarević
22	MF	AUT	Tim Paumgartner
23	DF	AUT	Nino Lesjak
24	GK	AUT	Florian Neureiter
27	MF	AUT	Bartu Öztürk
28	DF	AUT	Patrick Scheibenhofer
30	DF	AUT	Luka-Nils Sandmayr
—	GK	AUT	Martin Hasenauer

== Coaching staff ==
As of 9 September 2026

- Head coach: Arsim Deliu
- Assistant coach: Christoph Joham
- Goalkeeper coach: Stefan Weber
- Physiotherapist: Johannes Herzmaier
- Physiotherapist: Sophia Stelzer
- Chef: Rudi Codalonga

== Honours ==
- Austrian First League
  - Champions (1): 2012–13

== European record ==
Season	Competition	Round	Club	Home	Away	Aggregate
2014–15	UEFA Europa League	2Q	(Serbia) Čukarički	1–2	4–0	5–2
2014–15	UEFA Europa League	3Q	(Moldova) Zimbru Chișinău	1–2	1–0	2–2(a)

Notes

- 2Q: Second qualifying round
- 3Q: Third qualifying round

== Managers ==
- (North Macedonia) Miroslav Bojčeski (20 Aug 2005 – 30 June 2006)
- (Austria) Eduard Glieder (1 July 2006 – 30 June 2007)
- (Austria) Heimo Pfeifenberger (1 July 2007 – 12 Dec 2008)
- (North Macedonia) Miroslav Bojčeski (14 Dec 2008 – 30 June 2009)
- (Germany) Michael Brandner (1 July 2009 – 26 March 2010)
- (Austria) Johann Davare (interim) (26 March 2010 – 3 April 2010)
- (Austria) Heimo Pfeifenberger (4 April 2010 – 30 May 2012)
- (Austria) Adi Hütter (1 June 2012 – 31 May 2014)
- (Austria) Michael Baur (1 June 2014–15)
- (Austria) Peter Schöttel (17 June 2015 – 16 May 2016)
- (Austria) Andreas Fötschl (1 July 2016 – 31 Dec 2017)
- (Austria) Mario Messner (1 January 2018 – 4 Nov 2018)
- (Germany) Michael Brandner (5 November 2018 – 12 November 2018)
- (North Macedonia) Miroslav Bojčeski (3 December 2018 – 30 June 2020)
- (Austria) Heimo Pfeifenberger (1 July 2020 – 31 December 2021)
- (Austria) Thomas Schnöll (1 January 2022 – 21 November 2022)
- (Austria) Arsim Deliu (2 January 2023 – present)
