= 2013–14 FC Red Bull Salzburg season =

Red Bull Salzburg
2013–14 season
- Sporting Director: Ralf Rangnick
- Manager: Roger Schmidt
- Stadium: Red Bull Arena
- Bundesliga: 1st
- Austrian Cup: Winners
- Champions League: Third qualifying round (vs. Fenerbahçe)
- Europa League: Round of 16 (vs. Basel)
- Top goalscorer: League: Jonathan Soriano (31); All: Jonathan Soriano (48)
- Highest home attendance: 29,320 vs Ajax (27 February 2014); 29,320 vs Basel (20 March 2014)
- Lowest home attendance: 5,469 vs Wolfsberger AC (16 March 2014)
- Average home league attendance: 12,295 (4 May 2014)
Home colours	Away colours	Third colours

The 2013–14 FC Red Bull Salzburg season was the 81st season in club history. Red Bull Salzburg finished the season as champions of the Bundesliga and the Austrian Cup, completing a domestic double. In Europe, Salzburg where knocked out of the Champions League by Fenerbahçe in the third qualifying round, dropping into the Europa League where they reached the round of 16 before defeat to Basel.

== Squad ==
As of match played 18 May 2014

No.	Name	Nationality	Position	Date of birth (age)	Signed from	Signed in	Contract ends	Apps.	Goals
Goalkeepers
1	Eddie Gustafsson	(Sweden) (Note: Eddie Gustafsson was born in Philadelphia, United States, but also qualified to represent Sweden internationally, going on to make his debut for Sweden in 2000.)	GK	31 January 1977 (aged 37)	Lyn Oslo	2009			
20	Thomas Dähne	(Germany)	GK	4 January 1994 (aged 20)	Academy	2012		1	0
31	Péter Gulácsi	(Hungary)	GK	6 May 1990 (aged 24)	Liverpool	2013	2017	50	0
33	Alexander Walke	(Germany)	GK	6 June 1983 (aged 30)	Hansa Rostock	2010			
Defenders
5	André Ramalho	(Brazil)	DF	16 February 1992 (aged 22)	Academy	2012		52	8
6	Christian Schwegler	(Switzerland)	DF	6 June 1984 (aged 29)	Young Boys	2009			
8	Florian Klein	(Austria)	DF	17 November 1986 (aged 27)	Austria Wien	2012		61	3
15	Franz Schiemer	(Austria)	DF	21 March 1986 (aged 28)	Austria Wien	2009			
17	Andreas Ulmer	(Austria)	DF	30 October 1985 (aged 28)	SV Ried	2009			
25	Isaac Vorsah	(Ghana)	DF	21 June 1988 (aged 25)	TSG 1899 Hoffenheim	2012	2015	18	1
29	Rodnei	(Brazil)	DF	19 December 1980 (aged 33)	1. FC Kaiserslautern	2012	2015	30	0
36	Martin Hinteregger	(Austria)	DF	7 September 1992 (aged 21)	Academy	2010			
Midfielders
11	Marco Meilinger	(Austria)	MF	8 August 1991 (aged 22)	Academy	2011			
13	Stefan Ilsanker	(Austria)	MF	18 May 1989 (aged 25)	SV Mattersburg	2012		82	5
14	Valon Berisha	(Norway) (Note: Valon Berisha was born in Malmö, Sweden to Kosovo Albanian parents. Berisha qualified to represent Norway internationally, representing them at various levels until 2016, when he switched to representing Kosovo.)	MF	7 February 1993 (aged 21)	Viking	2012		80	14
18	Dušan Švento	(Slovakia)	MF	1 August 1985 (aged 28)	Slavia Prague	2009			
22	Stefan Hierländer	(Austria)	MF	3 February 1991 (aged 23)	Austria Kärnten	2010			
23	Robert Žulj	(Austria)	MF	5 February 1992 (aged 22)	SV Ried	2014		17	3
24	Christoph Leitgeb	(Austria)	MF	14 April 1985 (aged 29)	Sturm Graz	2007			
37	Valentino Lazaro	(Austria)	MF	24 March 1996 (aged 18)	Academy	2012		18	2
44	Kevin Kampl	(Slovenia) (Note: Kevin Kampl was born in Solingen, Germany, but also qualified to represent Slovenia internationally, going on to make his debut for Slovenia in 2012.)	MF	9 October 1990 (aged 23)	VfR Aalen	2012		78	18
	Jodel Dossou	(Benin)	MF	17 March 1992 (aged 22)	Club Africain	2014		0	0
Forwards
10	Sadio Mané	(Senegal)	FW	10 April 1992 (aged 22)	Metz	2012		79	42
19	Yordy Reyna	(Peru)	FW	17 September 1993 (aged 20)	Alianza Lima	2013	2017	9	0
26	Jonathan Soriano	(Spain)	FW	24 September 1985 (aged 28)	Barcelona B	2012		96	82
27	Alan	(Brazil)	FW	10 July 1989 (aged 24)	Fluminense	2010		103	69
42	Nils Quaschner	(Germany)	FW	22 April 1994 (aged 20)	Hansa Rostock	2013		0	0
Out on loan
3	Douglas da Silva	(Brazil)	DF	7 March 1984 (aged 30)	Hapoel Tel Aviv	2011		18	2
5	Christopher Dibon	(Austria)	DF	2 November 1990 (aged 23)	Admira Wacker	2012		7	0
16	Håvard Nielsen	(Norway)	FW	15 July 1993 (aged 20)	Vålerenga	2012		45	5
21	Taxiarchis Fountas	(Greece)	FW	4 September 1995 (aged 18)	AEK Athens	2013		1	0
28	Zymer Bytyqi	(Norway) (Note: Zymer Bytyqi was born in Sint-Truiden, Belgium to Kosovo Albanian parents. Bytyqi qualified to represent Norway internationally, representing them at various levels until 2014, when he switched to representing Kosovo.)	MF	7 February 1993 (aged 21)	Sandnes Ulf	2013		0	0
34	Yusuf Otubanjo	(Nigeria)	FW	12 September 1992 (aged 21)	Atlético Madrid C	2012		1	0
	Bright Edomwonyi	(Nigeria)	FW	24 July 1994 (aged 19)	Westerlo	2012		1	0
Left during the season
7	Jakob Jantscher	(Austria)	MF	8 January 1989 (aged 25)	Sturm Graz	2010			
39	Georg Teigl	(Austria)	DF	9 February 1991 (aged 23)	Academy	2009			
	Christoph Martschinko	(Austria)	DF	13 February 1994 (aged 20)	Academy	2012		0	0

=== Out on loan ===
Note: Flags indicate national team as defined under FIFA eligibility rules; some limited exceptions apply. Players may hold more than one non-FIFA nationality.

No.	Pos.	Nation	Player
3	DF	BRA	Douglas da Silva (at Vasco da Gama)
5	DF	AUT	Christopher Dibon (at Rapid Wien)
16	FW	NOR	Håvard Nielsen (at Eintracht Braunschweig)
21	FW	GRE	Taxiarchis Fountas (at SV Grödig)

No.	Pos.	Nation	Player
28	MF	NOR	Zymer Bytyqi (at Sandnes Ulf)
31	FW	NGR	Bright Edomwonyi (at Wacker Innsbruck)
34	FW	NGR	Yusuf Otubanjo (at Pasching)

=== Left during the season ===
Note: Flags indicate national team as defined under FIFA eligibility rules; some limited exceptions apply. Players may hold more than one non-FIFA nationality.

No.	Pos.	Nation	Player
7	MF	AUT	Jakob Jantscher (to NEC Nijmegen)
39	DF	AUT	Georg Teigl (to RB Leipzig)

No.	Pos.	Nation	Player
—	DF	AUT	Christoph Martschinko (to SV Grödig)

== Transfers ==
=== In ===
Date	Position	Nationality	Name	From	Fee	Ref.
7 June 2013	GK	(Hungary)	Péter Gulácsi	Liverpool	Free	
14 June 2013	FW	(Peru)	Yordy Reyna	Alianza Lima	Undisclosed	
22 July 2013	FW	(Greece)	Taxiarchis Fountas	AEK Athens	Undisclosed	
30 January 2014	MF	(Benin)	Jodel Dossou	Club Africain	Undisclosed	

=== Out ===
Date	Position	Nationality	Name	To	Fee	Ref.
25 June 2013	FW	(Uruguay)	Joaquín Boghossian	Quilmes	Undisclosed	
2 September 2013	MF	(Austria)	Jakob Jantscher	NEC Nijmegen	Undisclosed	
8 January 2014	MF	(Brazil)	Cristiano	Tochigi	Undisclosed	
14 January 2014	DF	(Austria)	Georg Teigl	RB Leipzig	Undisclosed	
31 January 2014	DF	(Austria)	Christoph Martschinko	SV Grödig	Undisclosed	

=== Loans out ===
Start date	Position	Nationality	Name	To	End date	Ref.
30 August 2012	DF	(Austria)	Christoph Martschinko	Wiener Neustadt	30 January 2014	
1 January 2013	MF	(Brazil)	Cristiano	Tochigi	7 January 2014	
3 January 2013	DF	(Brazil)	Douglas da Silva	Figueirense	31 December 2013	
21 January 2013	FW	(Nigeria)	Yusuf Otubanjo	Pasching	30 Jun3 2014	
9 March 2013	MF	(Norway)	Zymer Bytyqi	Sandnes Ulf	31 December 2014	
1 July 2013	DF	(Austria)	Christopher Dibon	Rapid Wien	End of Season	
5 January 2014	FW	(Norway)	Håvard Nielsen	Eintracht Braunschweig	30 June 2015	
17 January 2014	FW	(Nigeria)	Bright Edomwonyi	Wacker Innsbruck	End of Season	
31 January 2014	FW	(Greece)	Taxiarchis Fountas	SV Grödig	End of Season	
19 February 2014	DF	(Brazil)	Douglas da Silva	Vasco da Gama	31 December 2014	

=== Released ===
Date	Position	Nationality	Name	Joined	Date
30 June 2014	GK	(Sweden)	Eddie Gustafsson	Retired	
30 June 2014	DF	(Austria)	Christopher Dibon	Rapid Wien	1 July 2014
30 June 2014	DF	(Austria)	Florian Klein	VfB Stuttgart	1 July 2014
30 June 2014	MF	(Austria)	Stefan Hierländer	RB Leipzig	1 July 2014
30 June 2014	MF	(Austria)	Marco Meilinger	Austria Wien	1 July 2014
30 June 2014	FW	(Nigeria)	Yusuf Otubanjo	Blau-Weiß Linz	1 January 2015

== Friendlies ==
28 June 2013	SC Paderborn	2 – 7	Red Bull Salzburg	Paderborn, Germany
19:00 CEST (UTC+2)	Sağlık 6' (pen.); Amedick 77'	Report	Alan 21'; Soriano 49', 55'; Teigl 58'; Ramalho 67'; Reyna 71'; Klein 81'	Stadium: Benteler Arena; Attendance: 2,045; Referee: Sören Storks

2 July 2013	Sportclub Verl	0 – 0	Red Bull Salzburg	Verl
19:00 CEST (UTC+2)		Report		Stadium: Stadion an der Poststraße; Attendance: 512

7 July 2013	Red Bull Salzburg	3 – 0	Metz	Eugendorf
17:00 CEST (UTC+2)	Jantscher 65', 74'; Berisha 80'	Report		Attendance: 600; Referee: Manuel Schüttengruber

11 July 2013	Red Bull Salzburg	3 – 1	Schalke 04	Wals-Siezenheim
19:30 CEST (UTC+2)	Mané 16'; Soriano 51'; Hinteregger 77'	Report	Draxler 33'	Stadium: Red Bull Arena; Attendance: 17,300

6 September 2013	Auswahl Innviertel	0 – 13	Red Bull Salzburg	Riedau
18:00 CEST (UTC+2)			Soriano; Hierländer; Alan; Meilinger; Ilsanker; Teigl; Quaschner	Stadium: Allianz Pramtalarena

10 October 2013	SV Straßwalchen	1 – 10	Red Bull Salzburg	Straßwalchen
18:30 CEST (UTC+2)	Lugstein 57'		Alan 2', 42'; Teigl 32', 45'; Fountas 35', 40'; Völkl 57'; Quaschner 70'; Meilinger 71', 75'	Stadium: Sportplatz

11 January 2014	Red Bull Salzburg	8 – 0	1. SC Znojmo	Salzburg
CET (UTC+1)	Ulmer 5'; Soriano 8' (pen.); Alan 23', 32'; Yonov 37' (o.g.); Kampl 42'; Schwegler 45'; Žulj 53'	Report		Stadium: Akademie Liefering Platz 1 Attendance: 200; Referee: Christopher Jäger

18 January 2014	Red Bull Salzburg	3 – 0	Bayern Munich	Wals-Siezenheim
16:00 CET (UTC+1)	Mané 13'; Soriano 20' (pen.); Žulj 44'	Report		Stadium: Red Bull Arena; Attendance: 30,188; Referee: Dominik Ouschan

23 January 2014	Red Bull Salzburg	0 – 1	Zenit St.Petersburg	Doha, Qatar
09:30 CET (UTC+1)		Report	Hulk 81'	Stadium: Khalifa Stadium

27 January 2014	Red Bull Salzburg	4 – 1	Al-Merrikh	Doha, Qatar
16:00 CET (UTC+1)	Kampl 13'; Alan 48'} Mané 61'; Kamal 67' (o.g.)	Report	Traoré 8'	Stadium: Khalifa Stadium

== Competitions ==
=== Overview ===
Competition	First match	Last match	Starting round	Final position	Record							
Competition	First match	Last match	Starting round	Final position	Pld	W	D	L	GF	GA	GD	Win %
Bundesliga	20 July 2013	11 May 2014	Matchday 1	Winners	36	25	5	6	110	35	+75	69.44
Austrian Cup	14 July 2013	18 May 2014	First round	Winners	6	5	1	0	34	4	+30	83.33
Champions League	31 July 2013	6 August 2013	Third Qualifying round	Third Qualifying round	2	0	1	1	2	4	−2	0.00
Europa League	22 August 2013	20 March 2014	Playoff round	Round of 16	12	10	1	1	29	6	+23	83.33
Total					56	40	8	8	175	49	+126	71.43

Last updated: 18 May 2014
Source: Soccerway

=== Bundesliga ===
==== League table ====
Pos	Team	Pld	W	D	L	GF	GA	GD	Pts	Qualification or relegation
1	Red Bull Salzburg (C)	36	25	5	6	110	35	+75	80	Qualification for the Champions League third qualifying round
2	Rapid Wien	36	17	11	8	63	40	+23	62	Qualification for the Europa League play-off round
3	Grödig	36	15	9	12	68	71	−3	54	Qualification for the Europa League second qualifying round
4	Austria Wien	36	14	11	11	58	44	+14	53	
5	Sturm Graz	36	13	9	14	55	55	0	48	

Source: weltfussball.de (in German)
Rules for classification: 1) points; 2) goal difference; 3) number of goals scored.
(C) Champions

==== Results summary ====
Overall								Home						Away					
Pld	W	D	L	GF	GA	GD	Pts	W	D	L	GF	GA	GD	W	D	L	GF	GA	GD
36	25	5	6	110	35	+75	80	14	3	1	69	12	+57	11	2	5	41	23	+18

==== Results by round ====
Round	1	2	3	4	5	6	7	8	9	10	11	12	13	14	15	16	17	18	19	20	21	22	23	24	25	26	27	28	29	30	31	32	33	34	35	36
Ground	A	H	A	H	A	H	H	A	H	H	A	H	A	H	A	A	H	A	A	H	A	H	A	H	H	A	H	H	A	H	A	H	A	A	H	A
Result	W	W	D	W	D	W	D	W	D	W	W	W	W	W	L	L	W	W	W	W	W	W	W	W	W	W	W	W	L	D	W	L	W	L	W	L

Updated to match(es) played on 11 May 2014. Source: See Results
A = Away; H = Home; W = Win; D = Draw; L = Loss

==== Results ====
20 July 2013 1	Wiener Neustadt	1 – 5	Red Bull Salzburg	Wiener Neustadt
19:00 CEST (UTC+2)	Pollhammer 31'; Pichlmann (yellow card) 49'; Rakowitz (yellow card) 63'; Freitag (yellow card) 90'; Witteveen (yellow card) 90'	Report	Soriano 22', 32', 56'; Kampl 60', 85'; Schwegler (yellow card) 83'	Stadium: Stadion Wiener Neustadt; Attendance: 2,850; Referee: Gerhard Grobelnik

27 July 2013 2	Red Bull Salzburg	5 – 1	Austria Wien	Wals-Siezenheim
19:00 CEST (UTC+2)	Soriano 9'; Hinteregger (yellow card) 13'; Alan 28'; Kampl 46', 73' (yellow card) 47'; Ramalho 64'; Ilsanker (yellow card) 72'	Report	Jun (yellow card) 30'; Grünwald 40'; Mader (yellow card) 57'; Rogulj (yellow card) 58'; Gorgon (yellow card) 64'	Stadium: Red Bull Arena; Attendance: 12,819; Referee: Manuel Schüttengruber

3 August 2013 3	Wacker Innsbruck	1 – 1	Red Bull Salzburg	Innsbruck
19:00 CEST (UTC+2)	Kofler (yellow card) 30'; Hinterseer 45' (yellow card) 79'; Vučur (yellow card) 79'	Report	Soriano 15'; Hierländer (yellow card) 85'	Stadium: Tivoli-Neu; Attendance: 9,085; Referee: Gerhard Grobelnik

10 August 2013 4	Red Bull Salzburg	4 – 1	SV Grödig	Wals-Siezenheim
19:00 CEST (UTC+2)	Mané (yellow card) 45'; Hinteregger 52'; Hierländer (yellow card) 55'; Ramalho 67'; Berisha (yellow card) 83' (goal) 84'; Soriano 90'	Report	Zündel (yellow card) 31' (yellow-red card) 75'; Elsneg 38'; Strobl (yellow card) 63'; Tomi (yellow card) 74'; Trdina (yellow card) 89'	Stadium: Red Bull Arena; Attendance: 15,335; Referee: Dominik Ouschan

17 August 2013 5	Sturm Graz	1 – 1	Red Bull Salzburg	Graz
16:30 CEST (UTC+2)	Berić 58'	Report	Mané (yellow card) 19'; Soriano 23'; Ulmer (yellow card) 33'; Hierländer (yellow card) 37'; Švento (yellow card) 65'; Hinteregger (yellow card) 90'	Stadium: UPC Arena; Attendance: 7,852; Referee: Oliver Drachta

25 August 2013 6	Red Bull Salzburg	1 – 0	Admira Wacker	Wals-Siezenheim
19:00 CEST (UTC+2)	Hinteregger (yellow card) 55'; Soriano 59' (pen.)	Report	Schachner (yellow card) 21'; Domoraud (yellow card) 54'; Schwab (yellow card) 59'	Stadium: Red Bull Arena; Attendance: 6,150; Referee: Andreas Kollegger

1 September 2013 7	Red Bull Salzburg	1 – 1	Rapid Wien	Wals-Siezenheim
16:30 CEST (UTC+2)	Hierländer 43' (yellow card) 75'; Hinteregger (yellow card) 59'; Klein (yellow card) 90+4'	Report	Boyd (yellow card) 21' (goal) 65'; Petsos (yellow card) 34'; Pichler (yellow card) 43'; Sabitzer (yellow card) 90+1'	Stadium: Red Bull Arena; Attendance: 15,734; Referee: Dominik Ouschan

15 September 2013 8	SV Ried	0 – 5	Red Bull Salzburg	Ried im Innkreis
16:30 CEST (UTC+2)	Žulj (yellow card) 20'; Walch (yellow card) 40'; Hinum (yellow card) 40'; Ziegl (yellow card) 69'	Report	Ramalho 9'; Alan 16', 31' (red card) 61'; Ilsanker (yellow card) 21'; Schwegler (yellow card) 53'; Kampl (yellow card) 56' (goal) 65'; Rodnei (yellow card) 61'; Riegler 73' (o.g.); Mané (yellow card) 81'	Stadium: Keine Sorgen Arena; Attendance: 6,773; Referee: Harald Lechner

22 September 2013 9	Red Bull Salzburg	2 – 2	Wolfsberger AC	Wals-Siezenheim
19:00 CEST (UTC+2)	Mané 23'; Soriano 55'; Schwegler (yellow card) 86'	Report	Polverino (yellow card) 52'; Liendl 63'; Putsche (yellow card) 69'; Baldauf (yellow card) 79'; Gotal 87' (yellow card) 87'; Falk (yellow card) 88'	Stadium: Red Bull Arena; Attendance: 5,506; Referee: Gerhard Grobelnik

29 September 2013 10	Red Bull Salzburg	8 – 1	Wiener Neustadt	Wals-Siezenheim
16:30 CEST (UTC+2)	Alan 2', 40', 65', 67'; Soriano 42', 69' (pen.); Berisha 55'; Mané 84'	Report	Pollhammer (yellow card) 39'; Pichlmann 47'; Vollnhofer (yellow card) 69'; Koch (yellow card) 76'	Stadium: Red Bull Arena; Attendance: 7,924; Referee: Manuel Schüttengruber

6 October 2013 11	Austria Wien	1 – 2	Red Bull Salzburg	Vienna
16:30 CEST (UTC+2)	Royer 24'; Koch (yellow card) 33'; Leovac (yellow card) 66'	Report	Mané 8' (yellow card) 71'; Alan 48'; Rodnei (yellow card) 56'	Stadium: Generali Arena; Attendance: 8,803; Referee: Robert Schörgenhofer

19 October 2013 12	Red Bull Salzburg	6 – 0	Wacker Innsbruck	Wals-Siezenheim
16:30 CEST (UTC+2)	Alan 8', 23'; Ilsanker 26'; Mané 44'; Švento 58'; Soriano 81'	Report	Sáfár (red card) 16'; Hinterseer (yellow card) 30'	Stadium: Red Bull Arena; Attendance: 11,406; Referee: Rene Eisner

27 October 2013 13	SV Grödig	0 – 3	Red Bull Salzburg	Grödig
19:00 CET (UTC+1)	Cabrera (yellow card) 43' (yellow-red card) 90+4'; Taboga (yellow card) 46'; Potzmann (yellow card) 51'; Boller (yellow card) 70'; Leitgeb (yellow card) 71'	Report	Alan (yellow card) 31'; Mané 40', 55', 90' (yellow card) 87'; Schiemer (yellow card) 77'; Teigl (red card) 90+8'	Stadium: Untersberg-Arena; Attendance: 4,482; Referee: Alexander Harkam

2 November 2013 14	Red Bull Salzburg	1 – 0	Sturm Graz	Wals-Siezenheim
19:00 CET (UTC+1)	Hinteregger (yellow card) 5'; Alan (yellow card) 45'; Ilsanker 68'	Report	Kainz (yellow card) 8'; Hütter (yellow card) 37'; Madl (yellow card) 89'; Beichler (yellow card) 90+1'	Stadium: Red Bull Arena; Attendance: 10,049; Referee: Dominik Ouschan

10 November 2013 15	Admira Wacker	3 – 1	Red Bull Salzburg	Maria Enzersdorf
19:00 CET (UTC+1)	Schwab (yellow card) 15'; Schicker (yellow card) 31' (goal) 54'; Ebner (yellow card) 39'; Schösswendter 61' (yellow card) 90'; Ouédraogo 82'; Windbichler (yellow card) 86'	Report	Schwegler (yellow card) 66'; Mané 68'	Stadium: BSFZ-Arena; Attendance: Gerhard Grobelnik; Referee: 2,941

24 November 2013 16	Rapid Wien	2 – 1	Red Bull Salzburg	Vienna
16:30 CET (UTC+1)	Trimmel (yellow card) 24' (goal) 30'; Schrammel (yellow card) 38'; Behrendt (yellow card) 43'; Sabitzer 74'; Wydra (yellow card) 88'; Burgstaller (yellow card) 90'	Report	Alan 18' (yellow card) 73'; Schwegler (yellow card) 22'	Stadium: Gerhard Hanappi Stadium; Attendance: 14,901; Referee: Markus Hameter

1 December 2013 17	Red Bull Salzburg	4 – 0	SV Ried	Wals-Siezenheim
16:30 CET (UTC+1)	Kampl 31', 72'; Klein (yellow card) 37'; Schiemer 66'; Leitgeb 74'	Report	Hinum (yellow card) 29'; Schicker (yellow card) 62'; Kragl (yellow card) 65'; Walch (yellow card) 67'; Žulj (yellow card) 81'; Riegler (yellow card) 90+1'	Stadium: Red Bull Arena; Attendance: 7,377; Referee: Robert Schörgenhofer

4 December 2013 18	Wolfsberger AC	1 – 2	Red Bull Salzburg	Wolfsberg
20:30 CET (UTC+1)	Polverino (yellow card) 43'; Liendl 58'; Sollbauer (yellow card) 82'	Report	Alan (yellow card) 49' (goal) 52'; Svento 87'	Stadium: Lavanttal-Arena; Attendance: 2,893; Referee: Manuel Schüttengruber

2 February 2014 19	Wiener Neustadt	1 – 5	Red Bull Salzburg	Wiener Neustadt
14:00 CET (UTC+1)	Mally (yellow card) 44'; Fröschl 87'	Report	Ramalho (yellow card) 13'; Mané 24'; Soriano 34', 49'; Alan 41', 53'; Berisha (yellow card) 79'	Stadium: Stadion Wiener Neustadt; Attendance: 1,400; Referee: Gerhard Grobelnik

15 December 2013 20	Red Bull Salzburg	4 – 0	Austria Wien	Wals-Siezenheim
16:30 CET (UTC+1)	Ramalho 23'; Berisha 38'; Alan 66' (yellow card) 79'; Hinteregger (yellow card) 72'; Schwegler (yellow card) 73'; Mané 87'	Report	Royer (yellow card) 23'; Holland (yellow card) 27'; Kienast (yellow card) 59' (yellow-red card) 90'; Dilaver (yellow card) 68'; Suttner (yellow card) 70'; Ramsebner (yellow card) 83'	Stadium: Red Bull Arena; Attendance: 9,324; Referee: Alexander Harkam

18 December 2013 21	Wacker Innsbruck	0 – 1	Red Bull Salzburg	Innsbruck
20:30 CET (UTC+1)	Hauser (yellow card) 39'; Kofler (yellow card) 58'; Hinterseer (yellow card) 75'; Siller (yellow card) 80'	Report	Ulmer 67'; Schiemer (yellow card) 81'	Stadium: Tivoli-Neu; Attendance: 3,701; Referee: Harald Lechner

8 February 2014 22	Red Bull Salzburg	6 – 0	SV Grödig	Wals-Siezenheim
16:30 CET (UTC+1)	Alan 17', 66', 87'; Soriano 20', 57', 59'	Report	Boller (yellow card) 23'	Stadium: Red Bull Arena; Attendance: 12,231; Referee: Robert Schörgenhofer

15 February 2014 23	Sturm Graz	1 – 4	Red Bull Salzburg	Graz
16:30 CET (UTC+1)	Kainz (yellow card) 40' (goal) 87'; Madl (yellow card) 41'; Hütter (yellow card) 75'	Report	Ramalho 8'; Mané 14'; Hinteregger (yellow card) 27'; Kampl 32'; Hütter 58' (o.g.); Klein (yellow card) 78'	Stadium: UPC Arena; Attendance: 8,381; Referee: Manfred Schüttengruber

23 February 2014 24	Red Bull Salzburg	6 – 1	Admira Wacker	Wals-Siezenheim
16:30 CET (UTC+1)	Žulj (yellow card) 19' (goal) 59'; Lazaro 30'; Soriano 45'; Alan 48', 61', 90'	Report	Sulimani 2' (yellow card) 32' (yellow-red card) 33'; Thürauer (yellow card) 21'; Rusek (yellow card) 75'	Stadium: Red Bull Arena; Attendance: 6,138; Referee: Christian Dintar

2 March 2014 25	Red Bull Salzburg	6 – 3	Rapid Wien	Wals-Siezenheim
16:30 CET (UTC+1)	Soriano 10', 84', 90+5'; Ilsanker 41'; Sonnleitner 58' (o.g.); Walke (yellow card) 66'; Hinteregger (yellow card) 77'; Kampl 89'	Report	Boyd 45+4' (yellow card) 62'; Behrendt (yellow card) 52'; Petsos 56'; Trimmel (yellow card) 60' (goal) 66'	Stadium: Red Bull Arena; Attendance: 16,705

8 March 2014 26	SV Ried	1 – 3	Red Bull Salzburg	Ried im Innkreis
19:00 CET (UTC+1)	Gartler 14'; Oliva (yellow card) 38'; Zwischenbrugger (yellow card) 68'	Report	Soriano 7', 39'; Mané 30'; Rodnei (yellow card) 85'; Lazaro (yellow card) 90+3'	Stadium: Keine Sorgen Arena; Attendance: 5,661; Referee: Andreas Kollegger

16 March 2014 27	Red Bull Salzburg	5 – 0	Wolfsberger AC	Wals-Siezenheim
16:30 CET (UTC+1)	Soriano 33', 76'; Berisha (yellow card) 39' (goal) 82'; Ilsanker (yellow card) 62'; Lazaro 64' (yellow card) 65'; Klein 84'	Report	Standfest (yellow card) 10'; Suppan (yellow card) 49'; Sílvio (red card) 58'; Schwendinger (yellow card) 65'; Sollbauer (yellow card) 75'	Stadium: Red Bull Arena; Attendance: 5,469; Referee: Harald Lechner

23 March 2014 28	Red Bull Salzburg	5 – 0	Wiener Neustadt	Wals-Siezenheim
16:30 CET (UTC+1)	Alan 23', 57', 87'; Mané (yellow card) 39' (goal) 70'; Ramalho (yellow card) 43'; Soriano 45+1'	Report	Wallner (yellow card) 73'	Stadium: Red Bull Arena; Attendance: 6,332; Referee: Dieter Muckenhammer

26 March 2014 29	Austria Wien	3 – 0	Red Bull Salzburg	Vienna
20:30 CET (UTC+1)	Suttner (yellow card) 13' (goal) 27'; Royer 16'; Rotpuller (yellow card) 33'; Gorgon 52'	Report	Žulj (yellow card) 10'	Stadium: Generali Arena; Attendance: 8,948; Referee: Markus Hameter

29 March 2014 30	Red Bull Salzburg	0 – 0	Wacker Innsbruck	Wals-Siezenheim
19:00 CET (UTC+1)		Report	Siller (yellow card) 28'; Đokić (yellow card) 64'; Kofler (yellow card) 69'; Wernitznig (yellow card) 76'	Stadium: Red Bull Arena; Attendance: 8,123; Referee: Alexander Harkam

5 April 2014 31	SV Grödig	1 – 3	Red Bull Salzburg	Grödig
16:30 CEST (UTC+2)	Tschernegg (yellow card) 27'; Tomi (yellow card) 50'; Cabrera (yellow card) 65'; Perchtold (yellow card) 76'; Potzmann 83'	Report	Klein (yellow card) 13'; Ramalho (yellow card) 43'; Soriano 48'; Ulmer 76'; Berisha 78'	Stadium: Untersberg-Arena; Attendance: 2,805; Referee: Stephan Klossner

12 April 2014 32	Red Bull Salzburg	1 – 2	Sturm Graz	Wals-Siezenheim
16:30 CEST (UTC+2)	Madl 19' (o.g.); Hinteregger (yellow card) 36'	Report	Hölzl (yellow card) 51'; Djuricin 64'; Offenbacher (yellow card) 65'; Kainz 73' (yellow card) 90+2'	Stadium: Red Bull Arena; Attendance: 8,364; Referee: Harald Lechner

19 April 2014 33	Admira Wacker	2 – 3	Red Bull Salzburg	Maria Enzersdorf
19:00 CEST (UTC+2)	Toth (yellow card) 12'; Windbichler 30' (yellow card) 70'; Schwab (yellow card) 32'; Auer (yellow card) 53'; Schicker (yellow card) 55'; Domoraud 82'	Report	Soriano 2', 56' (pen.), 90'	Stadium: BSFZ-Arena; Attendance: 3,658; Referee: Dominik Ouschan

26 April 2014 34	Rapid Wien	2 – 1	Red Bull Salzburg	Vienna
19:00 CEST (UTC+2)	Boyd 15', 84'; Trimmel (yellow card) 8'; Hofmann (yellow card) 63'; Sabitzer (yellow card) 66'; Behrendt (yellow card) 71'	Report	Alan (yellow card) 1' (goal) 68'	Stadium: Gerhard Hanappi Stadium; Attendance: 15,891; Referee: Dieter Muckenhammer

4 May 2014 35	Red Bull Salzburg	4 – 0	SV Ried	Wals-Siezenheim
16:30 CEST (UTC+2)	Soriano 17'; Ilsanker 25'; Alan 36'; Hinteregger 63'	Report		Stadium: Red Bull Arena; Attendance: 17,456; Referee: Alexander Harkam

11 May 2014 36	Wolfsberger AC	2 – 0	Red Bull Salzburg	Wolfsberg
16:30 CEST (UTC+2)	Kerhe 16' (yellow card) 56'; Jacobo 68' (yellow card) 69'	Report	Kampl (yellow card) 31'; Hinteregger (yellow card) 67'; Mané (red card) 74'	Stadium: Lavanttal-Arena; Attendance: 3,198; Referee: Harald Lechner

=== Austrian Cup ===
14 July 2013 First Round	Union St. Florian	0 – 9	Red Bull Salzburg	Sankt Florian
19:00 CEST (UTC+2)	L.Mayr (yellow card) 44'	Report	Hinteregger 10'; Meilinger 14'; Alan 18'; Schwegler (yellow card) 31'; Ilsanker 36'; Soriano 54', 58', 67'; Mané 73'; Nielsen 85'	Stadium: Sportpark St. Florian; Attendance: 1,500; Referee: Harald Lechner

25 September 2013 Second Round	Lankowitz	1 – 1 (a.e.t.) (5 – 6 p)	Red Bull Salzburg	Maria Lankowitz
19:00 CEST (UTC+2)	B.Dinaj (yellow card) 53'; T.Grassl (yellow card) 65'; D.Rottensteiner 70'; M.Pöschl (yellow card) 80'	Report	Berisha 39' (yellow card) 60'; Lazaro (yellow card) 70'; Fountas (yellow card) 90+2' (yellow-red card) 98'	Stadium: Piberstein Arena; Attendance: 3,000; Referee: Helmut Trattnig
	Penalties
	G.Puntigam (penalty scored); B.Dinaj (penalty scored); D.Rottensteiner (penalty scored); K.Maritschnegg (penalty scored); Schöpf (penalty scored); T.Grassl (penalty missed)		(penalty scored) Klein; (penalty scored) Nielsen; (penalty scored) Berisha; (penalty scored) Ramalho; (penalty scored) Ilsanker; (penalty scored) Lazaro

30 October 2013 Third Round	Kapfenberger SV	1 – 7	Red Bull Salzburg	Kapfenberg
19:00 CEST (UTC+2)	Bingöl 11'; Sharifi (yellow card) 40'; Köfler (yellow card) 88'	Report	Ramalho 21'; Berisha 25', 50'; Ulmer (yellow card) 40'; Alan 59'; Schiemer 63' (yellow card) 80'; Schwegler 82'; Mané 85'	Stadium: Franz Fekete Stadium; Attendance: 2,931; Referee: Markus Hameter

16 April 2014 Quarterfinal	Wolfsberger AC	0 – 6	Red Bull Salzburg	Wolfsberg
18:00 CEST (UTC+2)	Standfest (yellow card) 21'; Kerhe (yellow card) 37'; Sollbauer (yellow card) 62'; Rnić (red card) 70'	Report	Klein 49' (yellow card) 54'; Ramalho 59' (yellow card) 64'; Alan 72', 90+2'; Žulj 77' (pen.); Meilinger 90'	Stadium: Lavanttal-Arena; Attendance: 4,600; Referee: Markus Hameter

7 May 2014 Semifinal	SV Horn	0 – 7	Red Bull Salzburg	Horn
18:00 CEST (UTC+2)	Lackner (yellow card) 44'	Report	Antonitsch 29' (o.g.); Mané 31', 66', 80'; Schwegler (yellow card) 51'; Kampl 53'; Alan 75'; Žulj 84'	Stadium: Waldviertler Volksbank Arena; Attendance: 5,500; Referee: Andreas Kollegger

==== Final ====
18 May 2014	Red Bull Salzburg	4 – 2	St. Pölten	Klagenfurt
16:30 CEST (UTC+2)	Klein 36'; Kampl 42'; Soriano 63', 67'	Report	Jano 40'; Kerschbaumer (yellow card) 48'; Grasegger (yellow card) 54'; Noël 70'	Stadium: Wörthersee Stadion; Attendance: 11,700; Referee: Christian Dintar

=== UEFA Champions League ===
==== Qualifying rounds ====
31 July 2013 Third Qualifying round 1st leg	Red Bull Salzburg (Austria)	1 – 1	(Turkey) Fenerbahçe	Wals-Siezenheim, Austria
20:30 CEST (UTC+2)	Schwegler (yellow card) 55'; Alan 69'; Hierländer (yellow card) 90+4'; Kampl (yellow card) 90+6'	Report	Emre (yellow card) 22'; Cristian 90+5' (pen.)	Stadium: Red Bull Arena; Attendance: 28,793; Referee: Duarte Gomes (Portugal)

6 August 2013 Third Qualifying round 2nd leg	Fenerbahçe (Turkey)	3 – 1 (4 – 2 agg.)	(Austria) Red Bull Salzburg	Istanbul, Turkey
20:45 CEST (UTC+2)	Meireles 8'; Sow 18'; Webó 35'; Potuk (yellow card) 66'	Report	Soriano 4'; Alan (yellow card) 25'; Mané (yellow card) 70'; Ramalho (yellow card) 87'	Stadium: Şükrü Saracoğlu Stadium; Attendance: 45,000; Referee: Paweł Gil (Poland)

=== UEFA Europa League ===
==== Qualifying rounds ====
22 August 2013 Playoff round 1st leg	Red Bull Salzburg (Austria)	5 – 0	(Lithuania) Žalgiris	Wals-Siezenheim, Austria
19:00 CEST (UTC+2)	Soriano 29', 37', 63'; Mané 40'; Hinteregger 68'	Report	Skerla (yellow card) 17'; Komolov (yellow card) 69'	Stadium: Red Bull Arena; Attendance: 7,885; Referee: Aleksandar Stavrev (Macedonia)

29 August 2013 Playoff round 2nd leg	Žalgiris (Lithuania)	0 – 2 (0 – 7 agg.)	(Austria) Red Bull Salzburg	Vilnius, Lithuania
20:30 CEST (UTC+2)	Skerla (yellow card) 20'	Report	Kampl 60'; Meilinger 74'; Ilsanker (yellow card) 78'	Stadium: LFF Stadium; Attendance: 4,700; Referee: Fredy Fautrel (France)

==== Group stage ====
Pos	Team	Pld	W	D	L	GF	GA	GD	Pts	Qualification	SAL	ESB	ELF	STA
1	(Austria) Red Bull Salzburg	6	6	0	0	15	3	+12	18	Advance to knockout phase	—	3–0	4–0	2–1
2	(Denmark) Esbjerg	6	4	0	2	8	8	0	12	Advance to knockout phase	1–2	—	1–0	2–1
3	(Sweden) IF Elfsborg	6	1	1	4	5	10	−5	4		0–1	1–2	—	1–1
4	(Belgium) Standard Liège	6	0	1	5	6	13	−7	1		1–3	1–2	1–3	—

Source: Soccerway

19 September 2013 1	Red Bull Salzburg (Austria)	4 – 0	(Sweden) Elfsborg	Wals-Siezenheim, Austria
19:00 CEST (UTC+2)	Alan 36'; Soriano 44' (pen.), 69', 79'; Ramalho (yellow card) 47'; Schwegler (yellow card) 56'	Report	J.Larsson (yellow card) 19'; Jørgensen (yellow card) 37'; Ishizaki (yellow card) 53'	Stadium: Red Bull Arena; Attendance: 7,879; Referee: Leontios Trattou (Cyprus)

3 October 2013 2	Esbjerg (Denmark)	1 – 2	(Austria) Red Bull Salzburg	Esbjerg, Denmark
21:05 CEST (UTC+2)	Lekven (yellow card) 60'; Diouf 89'; J.Ankersen (yellow card) 90+2'	Report	Alan 6', 38'; Soriano (yellow card) 31'; Kampl (yellow card) 52'	Stadium: Blue Water Arena; Attendance: 11,298; Referee: Jorge Sousa (Portugal)

24 October 2013 3	Red Bull Salzburg (Austria)	2 – 1	(Belgium) Standard Liège	Wals-Siezenheim, Austria
21:05 CEST (UTC+2)	Ramalho (yellow card) 4' (goal) 85'; Mané (yellow card) 15' (yellow-red card) 42'; Soriano 53'; Ilsanker (yellow card) 63'	Report	Carcela (yellow card) 27' (yellow-red card) 38'; Ezekiel (yellow card) 57'; Kanu (red card) 67'; Mujangi Bia 88' (pen.)	Stadium: Red Bull Arena; Attendance: 14,856; Referee: Ivan Kružliak (Slovakia)

7 November 2013 4	Standard Liège (Belgium)	1 – 3	(Austria) Red Bull Salzburg	Liège, Belgium
19:00 CET (UTC+1)	Ezekiel (yellow card) 20'; M'Poku 55'; Opare (yellow card) 86'; Vainqueur (yellow card) 90+2'; Batshuayi (yellow card) 90+4'	Report	Schwegler (yellow card) 8'; Švento 42'; Kampl 45+1' (yellow card) 90+4'; Alan 59'; Hinteregger (yellow card) 64'; Ramalho (yellow card) 67'	Stadium: Stade Maurice Dufrasne; Attendance: 20,000; Referee: Aleksei Nikolaev (Russia)

28 November 2013 5	Elfsborg (Sweden)	0 – 1	(Austria) Red Bull Salzburg	Borås, Sweden
21:05 CET (UTC+1)	Jönsson (yellow card) 15'; Hult (yellow card) 38'; Ishizaki (yellow card) 81'	Report	Meilinger 39'; Schwegler (yellow card) 83'; Reyna (yellow card) 90+3'	Stadium: Borås Arena; Attendance: 2,456; Referee: Kristo Tohver (Estonia)

12 December 2013 6	Red Bull Salzburg (Austria)	3 – 0	(Denmark) Esbjerg	Wals-Siezenheim, Austria
19:00 CET (UTC+1)	Mané 19', 63'; Kampl 58'	Report	Knudsen (yellow card) 55'; Drobo-Ampem (yellow card) 69'	Stadium: Red Bull Arena; Attendance: 6,890; Referee: Bülent Yıldırım (Turkey)

==== Knockout phase ====
20 February 2014 Round of 32 1st leg	Ajax (Netherlands)	0 – 3	(Austria) Red Bull Salzburg	Amsterdam, Netherlands
21:05 CET (UTC+1)	Veltman (yellow card) 13' de Jong (yellow card) 27'; Blind (yellow card) 77'	Report	Soriano 14' (pen.), 35'; Leitgeb (yellow card) 19'; Mané 21'; Hinteregger (yellow card) 42'	Stadium: Amsterdam Arena; Attendance: 51,240; Referee: Clément Turpin (France)

27 February 2014 Round of 32 2nd leg	Red Bull Salzburg (Austria)	3 – 1 (6 – 1 agg.)	(Netherlands) Ajax	Wals-Siezenheim, Austria
19:00 CET (UTC+1)	Leitgeb (yellow card) 43'; Van der Hoorn 56' (o.g.); Mané 66'; Soriano 77'	Report	Poulsen (yellow card) 27'; Denswil (yellow card) 49'; Klaassen 82'	Stadium: Red Bull Arena; Attendance: 29,320; Referee: Paolo Tagliavento (Italy)

13 March 2014 Round of 16 1st leg	Basel (Switzerland)	0 – 0	(Austria) Red Bull Salzburg	Basel, Switzerland
19:00 CET (UTC+1)	Dié (yellow card) 14'; Sio (yellow card) 23'; P.Degen (yellow card) 84'	Report	Hinteregger (yellow card) 14'; Mané (yellow card) 20'; Klein (yellow card) 70'	Stadium: St. Jakob-Park; Attendance: 17,027; Referee: Ovidiu Hațegan (Romania)

20 March 2014 Round of 16 2nd leg	Red Bull Salzburg (Austria)	1 – 2 (1 – 2 agg.)	(Switzerland) Basel	Wals-Siezenheim, Austria
21:05 CET (UTC+1)	Soriano 22'; Alan (yellow card) 54' (yellow-red card) 86'; Rodnei (yellow card) 62'; Ramalho (yellow card) 78'; Leitgeb (yellow card) 90+1'	Report	Streller (yellow card) 9' (goal) 50'; Suchý (red card) 9'; Sio (yellow card) 38'; Ar.Ajeti (yellow card) 54'; Sauro 60'; P.Degen (yellow card) 88'	Stadium: Red Bull Arena; Attendance: 29,320; Referee: Manuel Gräfe (Germany)

== Statistics ==
As of match played 18 May 2014

=== Appearances and goals ===
No.	Pos	Nat	Player	Total		Bundesliga		Austrian Cup		UEFA Champions League		UEFA Europa League	
No.	Pos	Nat	Player	Apps	Goals	Apps	Goals	Apps	Goals	Apps	Goals	Apps	Goals
1	GK	(Sweden) SWE	Eddie Gustafsson	1	0	1	0	0	0	0	0	0	0
5	DF	(Brazil) BRA	André Ramalho	52	8	33	5	6	2	2	0	11	1
6	DF	(Switzerland) SUI	Christian Schwegler	32	1	18+1	0	3+1	1	1	0	8	0
8	DF	(Austria) AUT	Florian Klein	36	3	18+5	1	4+1	2	1	0	5+2	0
10	FW	(Senegal) SEN	Sadio Mané	50	23	30+3	13	4	5	2	0	11	5
11	MF	(Austria) AUT	Marco Meilinger	30	4	6+12	0	2+2	2	2	0	2+4	2
13	MF	(Austria) AUT	Stefan Ilsanker	51	5	30+2	4	5+1	1	2	0	10+1	0
14	MF	(Norway) NOR	Valon Berisha	47	8	16+16	5	2+1	3	0+1	0	4+7	0
15	DF	(Austria) AUT	Franz Schiemer	18	2	6+7	1	1	1	0	0	2+2	0
17	DF	(Austria) AUT	Andreas Ulmer	47	2	29+1	2	5	0	2	0	10	0
18	MF	(Slovakia) SVK	Dušan Švento	27	3	11+10	2	1	0	0	0	3+2	1
19	FW	(Peru) PER	Yordy Reyna	9	0	0+4	0	1	0	0+1	0	0+3	0
22	MF	(Austria) AUT	Stefan Hierländer	28	2	10+8	1	0+4	0	0+2	0	2+2	1
23	MF	(Austria) AUT	Robert Žulj	17	3	6+4	1	0+3	2	0	0	1+3	0
24	MF	(Austria) AUT	Christoph Leitgeb	36	1	18+4	1	4+1	0	0	0	7+2	0
26	FW	(Spain) ESP	Jonathan Soriano	43	48	28	31	4	5	2	1	9	11
27	FW	(Brazil) BRA	Alan	46	36	27+2	26	5	5	2	1	9+1	4
29	DF	(Brazil) BRA	Rodnei	12	0	7+1	0	0	0	0	0	4	0
31	GK	(Hungary) HUN	Péter Gulácsi	50	0	30+1	0	5	0	2	0	12	0
33	GK	(Germany) GER	Alexander Walke	8	0	5+2	0	1	0	0	0	0	0
36	DF	(Austria) AUT	Martin Hinteregger	50	3	29+3	2	6	1	2	0	9+1	0
37	MF	(Austria) AUT	Valentino Lazaro	13	2	4+7	2	0	0	0+1	0	0+1	0
44	MF	(Slovenia) SLO	Kevin Kampl	51	14	28+5	9	5	2	2	0	11	3
Players away on loan :
16	FW	(Norway) NOR	Håvard Nielsen	17	1	7+2	0	1+2	1	0	0	2+3	0
21	FW	(Greece) GRE	Taxiarchis Fountas	1	0	0	0	0	0	0+1	0	0	0
Players who left Red Bull Salzburg during the season:
7	MF	(Austria) AUT	Jakob Jantscher	4	0	3	0	0	0	0+1	0	0	0
39	DF	(Austria) AUT	Georg Teigl	9	0	1+5	0	1	0	0	0	0+2	0

=== Goal scorers ===
Place	Position	Nation	Number	Name	Bundesliga	Austrian Cup	UEFA Champions League	UEFA Europa League	Total
1	FW	(Spain)	26	Jonathan Soriano	31	5	1	11	48
2	FW	(Brazil)	27	Alan Carvalho	26	5	1	4	36
3	FW	(Senegal)	10	Sadio Mané	13	5	0	5	23
4	MF	(Slovenia)	44	Kevin Kampl	9	2	0	3	14
5	MF	(Norway)	14	Valon Berisha	5	3	0	0	8
5	DF	(Brazil)	5	André Ramalho	5	2	0	1	8
7				Own goal	4	1	0	1	6
8	MF	(Austria)	13	Stefan Ilsanker	4	1	0	0	4
8	MF	(Austria)	11	Marco Meilinger	0	2	0	2	4
10	DF	(Austria)	36	Martin Hinteregger	2	1	0	0	3
10	MF	(Slovakia)	18	Dušan Švento	2	0	0	1	3
10	MF	(Austria)	23	Robert Žulj	1	2	0	0	3
10	DF	(Austria)	8	Florian Klein	1	2	0	0	3
14	DF	(Austria)	17	Andreas Ulmer	2	0	0	0	2
14	MF	(Austria)	37	Valentino Lazaro	2	0	0	0	2
14	DF	(Austria)	15	Franz Schiemer	1	1	0	0	2
14	MF	(Austria)	22	Stefan Hierländer	1	0	0	1	2
18	MF	(Austria)	24	Christoph Leitgeb	1	0	0	0	1
18	FW	(Norway)	16	Håvard Nielsen	0	1	0	0	1
18	DF	(Switzerland)	6	Christian Schwegler	0	1	0	0	1
				TOTALS	110	34	2	29	175

=== Clean sheets ===
Place	Position	Nation	Number	Name	Bundesliga	Austrian Cup	UEFA Champions League	UEFA Europa League	Total
1	GK	(Hungary)	31	Péter Gulácsi	11	3	0	7	21
2	GK	(Germany)	33	Alexander Walke	3	0	0	0	3
3	GK	(Sweden)	1	Eddie Gustafsson	1	0	0	0	1
				TOTALS	13	3	0	7	23

Gulácsi & Walke both played in Salzburg's 0-0 draw with Wacker Innsbruck on 29 March 2014.
Gustafsson & Gulácsi both played in Salzburg's 4-0 victory over SV Ried on 4 May 2014.

=== Disciplinary record ===
Number	Nation	Position	Name	Bundesliga		Austrian Cup		UEFA Champions League		UEFA Europa League		Total	
Number	Nation	Position	Name	Yellow card	Red card	Yellow card	Red card	Yellow card	Red card	Yellow card	Red card	Yellow card	Red card
5	(Brazil)	DF	André Ramalho	3	0	1	0	1	0	4	0	9	0
6	(Switzerland)	DF	Christian Schwegler	6	0	2	0	1	0	3	0	12	0
8	(Austria)	DF	Florian Klein	4	0	1	0	0	0	1	0	6	0
10	(Senegal)	FW	Sadio Mané	6	1	0	0	1	0	3	1	10	2
13	(Austria)	MF	Stefan Ilsanker	3	0	0	0	0	0	2	0	5	0
14	(Norway)	MF	Valon Berisha	3	0	1	0	0	0	0	0	4	0
15	(Austria)	DF	Franz Schiemer	2	0	1	0	0	0	0	0	3	0
17	(Austria)	DF	Andreas Ulmer	1	0	1	0	0	0	0	0	2	0
18	(Slovakia)	MF	Dušan Švento	1	0	0	0	0	0	0	0	1	0
19	(Peru)	FW	Yordy Reyna	0	0	0	0	0	0	1	0	1	0
22	(Austria)	MF	Stefan Hierländer	4	0	0	0	1	0	0	0	5	0
23	(Austria)	MF	Robert Žulj	2	0	0	0	0	0	0	0	2	0
24	(Austria)	MF	Christoph Leitgeb	0	0	0	0	0	0	3	0	3	0
26	(Spain)	FW	Jonathan Soriano	0	0	0	0	0	0	1	0	1	0
27	(Brazil)	FW	Alan Carvalho	6	1	0	0	1	0	2	1	9	2
29	(Brazil)	DF	Rodnei	3	0	0	0	0	0	1	0	4	0
33	(Germany)	GK	Alexander Walke	1	0	0	0	0	0	0	0	1	0
36	(Austria)	DF	Martin Hinteregger	10	0	0	0	0	0	3	0	13	0
37	(Austria)	MF	Valentino Lazaro	2	0	1	0	0	0	0	0	3	0
44	(Slovenia)	MF	Kevin Kampl	3	0	0	0	1	0	2	0	6	0
Players away on loan:
21	(Greece)	FW	Taxiarchis Fountas	0	0	2	1	0	0	0	0	2	1
Players who left Red Bull Salzburg during the season:
39	(Austria)	DF	Georg Teigl	0	1	0	0	0	0	0	0	0	1
			TOTALS	60	3	10	1	6	0	26	2	102	6
