= Florian Klein =

Austrian footballer (born 1986)

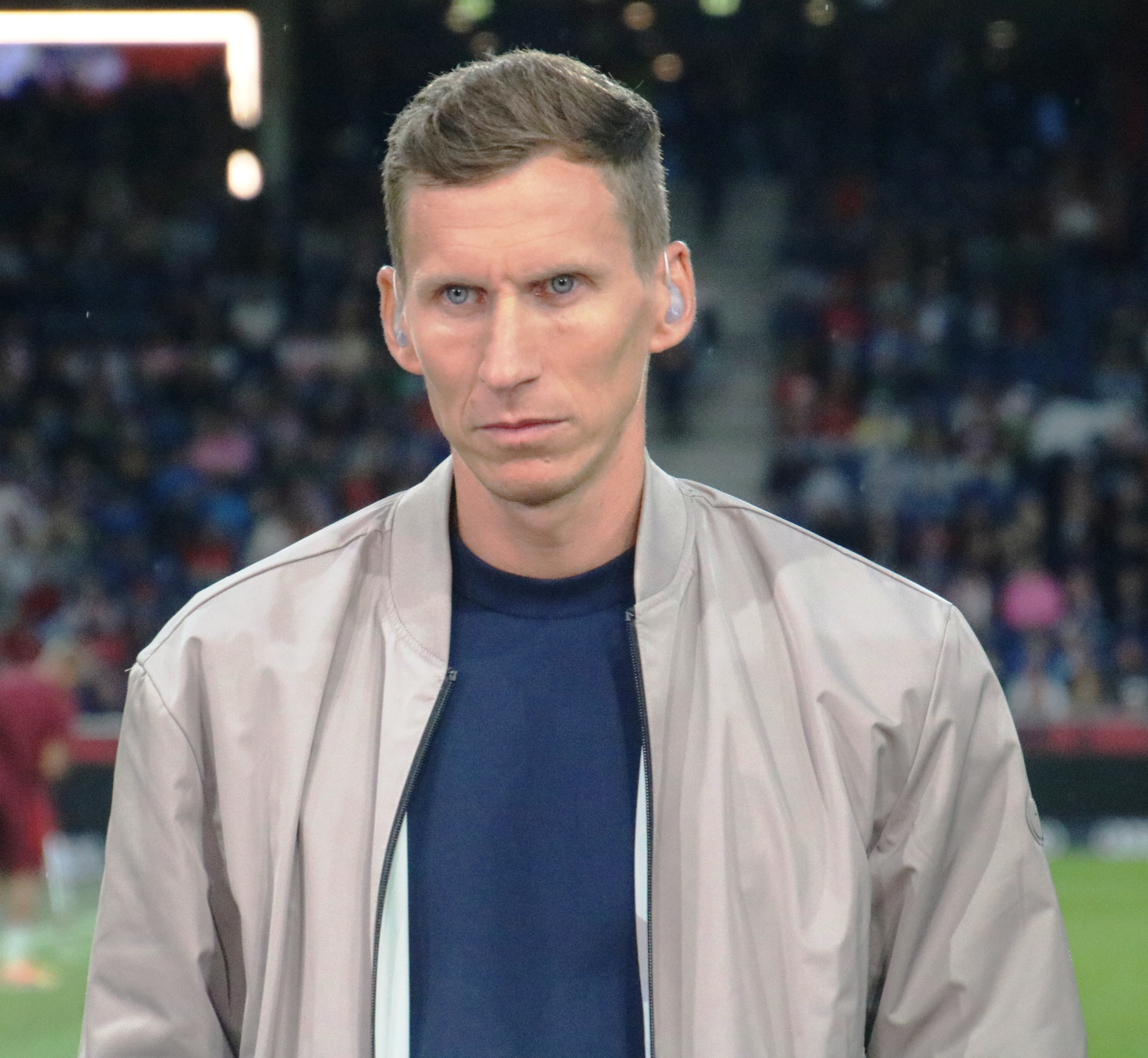
- Klein in 2025

Personal information
- Date of birth: 17 November 1986 (age 39)
- Place of birth: Linz, Upper Austria, Austria
- Height: 1.80 m (5 ft 11 in)
- Position: Defender

Youth career
- 1994–2004: LASK

Senior career*
Years	Team	Apps	(Gls)
2004–2009	LASK	163	(13)
2003–2004	→ FC Blau-Weiß Linz (loan)	19	(5)
2009–2012	Austria Wien	71	(6)
2012–2014	Red Bull Salzburg	43	(1)
2014–2017	VfB Stuttgart	75	(4)
2017–2020	Austria Wien	85	(5)

International career^{‡}
2005–2006	Austria U19	5	(0)
2006–2008	Austria U21	23	(3)
2010–2017	Austria	45	(0)
- * Club domestic league appearances and goals as of 29 August 2020 ‡ National team caps and goals as of 15 November 2016

Florian Klein (born 17 November 1986) is an Austrian former professional footballer who played as a defender.

== Club career ==
Klein began his career in September 1994 in the youth team of LASK Linz and was promoted to the senior team in July 2004. He played on loan for FC Blau-Weiß Linz in the 2003–04 season and returned to Linz after the end of the season. After 163 games in 14 years for the club, in which he scored 13 goals, Klein signed a two-year contract with Austria Wien on 30 April 2009. In 2012, he joined Red Bull Salzburg.

After the end of his contract with Salzburg on 1 July 2014, Klein moved to VfB Stuttgart on a free transfer. On 6 May 2014, he signed a contract until June 2017 with the club.

He returned to Austria Wien on 23 August 2017.

== International career ==
Klein has played for Austria under-19 and Austria under-21. On 19 May 2010, Klein made his debut for the Austria against Croatia.

He represented the national team at 2016 UEFA Euro.

== Career statistics ==
As of 1 July 2019

Appearances and goals by club, season and competition
Club	Season	League			Cup (Note: Includes Austrian Cup and German Cup.)		Continental (Note: Includes UEFA Champions League and UEFA Europa League.)		Other		Total		Ref.
Club	Season	Division	Apps	Goals	Apps	Goals	Apps	Goals	Apps	Goals	Apps	Goals	Ref.
LASK	2004–05	Austrian First League	29	0	2	0	—		–		31	0	
LASK	2005–06	Austrian First League	35	1	1	0	—		–		36	1	
LASK	2006–07	Austrian First League	32	5	3	0	—		–		35	5	
LASK	2007–08	Austrian Bundesliga	34	1	—		–		—		34	1	
LASK	2008–09	Austrian Bundesliga	33	5	2	0	–		—		35	5	
LASK	Total		163	12	8	0	0	0	0	0	171	12	—
Austria Wien	2009–10	Austrian Bundesliga	35	4	3	0	10	0	–		48	4	
Austria Wien	2010–11	Austrian Bundesliga	36	2	4	0	6	1	–		46	3	
Austria Wien	2011–12	Austrian Bundesliga	34	0	2	0	12	0	–		48	0	
Austria Wien	Total		105	6	9	0	28	1	0	0	142	7	—
Red Bull Salzburg	2012–13	Austrian Bundesliga	20	0	3	0	2	0	–		25	0	
Red Bull Salzburg	2013–14	Austrian Bundesliga	23	1	5	2	8	0	–		36	3	
Red Bull Salzburg	Total		43	1	8	2	10	0	0	0	61	3	—
VfB Stuttgart	2014–15	Bundesliga	34	3	1	0	—		–		35	3	
VfB Stuttgart	2015–16	Bundesliga	22	0	2	0	—		–		24	0	
VfB Stuttgart	2016–17	2. Bundesliga	19	1	2	0	—		–		21	1	
VfB Stuttgart	Total		75	4	5	0	0	0	0	0	80	4	—
Austria Wien	2017–18	Austrian Bundesliga	21	3	1	0	3	0	–		25	3	
Austria Wien	2018–19	Austrian Bundesliga	22	2	4	0	0	0	10	0	36	2	
Austria Wien	2019–20	Austrian Bundesliga	0	0	0	0	0	0	0	0	0	0	
Austria Wien	Total		43	5	5	0	3	0	10	0	61	5	—
Career total			429	28	35	2	41	1	10	0	505	31	—

== Honours ==
Red Bull Salzburg

- Austrian Bundesliga: 2013–14
- Austrian Cup: 2013–14
