= Stefan Ilsanker =

Austrian footballer (born 1989)

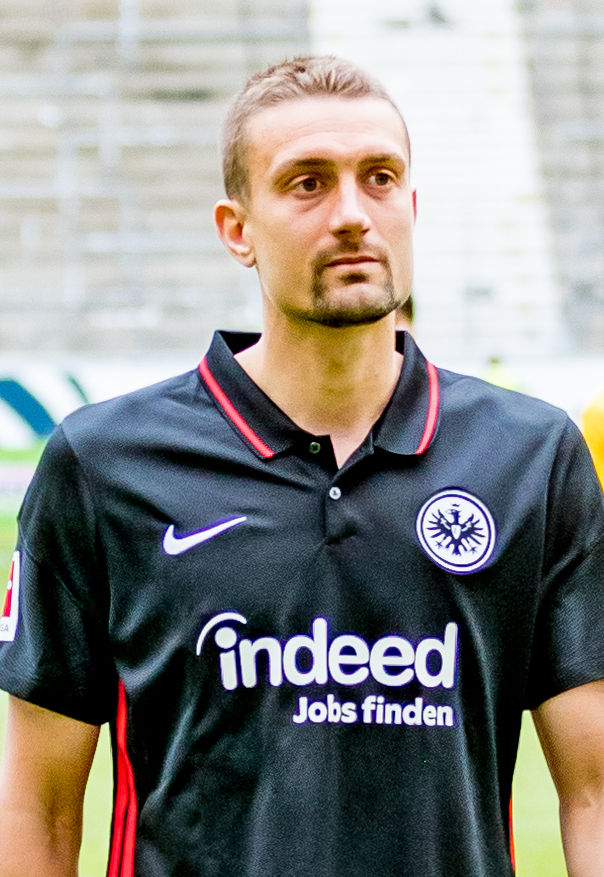
- Ilsanker with Eintracht Frankfurt in 2022

Personal information
- Date of birth: 18 May 1989 (age 37)
- Place of birth: Hallein, Salzburg, Austria
- Height: 1.89 m (6 ft 2 in)
- Position: Defensive midfielder

Team information
- Current team: USV Koppl

Youth career
- –2005: 1. Halleiner SK
- 2005–2007: Red Bull Salzburg

Senior career*
Years	Team	Apps	(Gls)
2005–2010	Red Bull Juniors Salzburg	76	(4)
2009–2010	Red Bull Salzburg	0	(0)
2010–2012	SV Mattersburg	50	(0)
2012–2015	Red Bull Salzburg	89	(4)
2015–2020	RB Leipzig	105	(1)
2020–2022	Eintracht Frankfurt	51	(3)
2022–2023	Genoa	16	(0)
2025–	USV Koppl	0	(0)
Total		387	(12)

International career
2007–2008	Austria U19	12	(0)
2008–2010	Austria U21	9	(0)
2014–2022	Austria	61	(0)
- * Club domestic league appearances and goals

Stefan Ilsanker (born 18 May 1989) is an Austrian former professional footballer who played as a defensive midfielder.

A product of the Red Bull Salzburg academy, Ilsanker's professional career spanned 15 years, where he also played for SV Mattersburg, RB Leipzig, Eintracht Frankfurt and Genoa. During his active career, he also represented Austria at the Under-19 European Championship and was also a member of the under-21 team. He was a full senior international between 2014 and 2022.

== Club career ==
Ilsanker began his career in the youth squad of 1. Halleiner SK as goalkeeper but soon switched into the midfield. In 2005, he signed with Red Bull Salzburg, where he played in the Red Bull Juniors team.

On 4 April 2009, Ilsanker was called up to the first team bench for a league game. His first game for Red Bull Salzburg was a national cup match on 15 August 2009. On 25 August 2009, he played his first international game for Red Bull Salzburg in the UEFA Champions League qualifier versus Maccabi Haifa.

At the end of the 2009–10 season Ilsanker signed with SV Mattersburg. In 2012, he came back to Red Bull Salzburg. In the meantime, he was a regular of the starting team of the club. On 26 February, the club announced, that his contract was extended till 2018.

Stefan Ilsanker was sent-off on 19 December 2018 against Bayern Munich.

On 31 January 2020, Ilsanker joined Eintracht Frankfurt on a deal lasting until 2022. On 3 June 2020, Ilsanker came off the bench against Werder Bremen and scored twice in the final 10 minutes of the match to secure a 3–0 victory.

On 23 June 2022, Ilsanker joined Italian club Genoa.

He announced his retirement from football on 6 January 2024, after being without a club for six months following his release from Genoa.

== International career ==
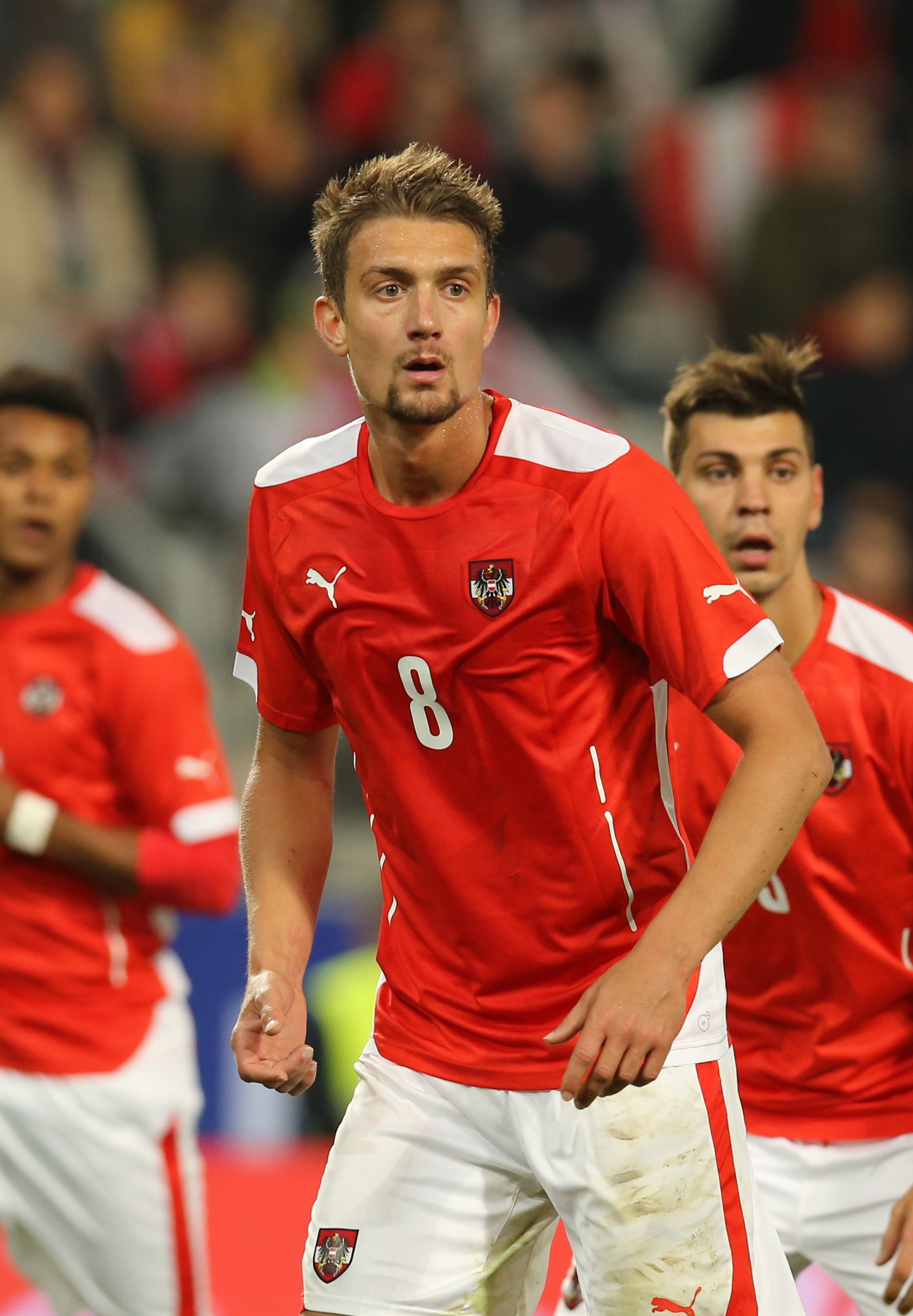
Stefan Ilsanker with the Austria national football team, 2014

Ilsanker has won over 40 caps for Austria since his debut in 2014. Ilsanker represented his country at Euro 2016, where Austria finished last in Group F. Ilsanker played in two matches for Austria at the tournament, their 0–0 draw with eventual champions Portugal and 2–1 loss to Iceland.

== Personal life ==
Stefan Ilsanker is the son of Herbert Ilsanker, the goalkeeper coach of Red Bull Salzburg.

== Career statistics ==
=== Club ===
Appearances and goals by club, season and competition
Club	Season	League			Cup		Continental		Total	
Club	Season	Division	Apps	Goals	Apps	Goals	Apps	Goals	Apps	Goals
Red Bull Salzburg (A)	2006–07	Austrian First League	0	0	3	0	—		3	0
Red Bull Salzburg (A)	2007–08	Austrian First League	26	2	—		—		26	2
Red Bull Salzburg (A)	2008–09	Austrian First League	23	0	1	0	—		24	0
Red Bull Salzburg (A)	2009–10	Austrian First League	27	2	—		—		27	2
Red Bull Salzburg (A)	Total		76	4	4	0	—		80	4
Red Bull Salzburg	2009–10	Austrian Bundesliga	0	0	2	0	1	0	3	0
Mattersburg	2010–11	Austrian Bundesliga	26	0	4	0	—		30	0
Mattersburg	2011–12	Austrian Bundesliga	24	0	2	0	—		26	0
Mattersburg	Total		50	0	6	0	—		56	0
Red Bull Salzburg	2012–13	Austrian Bundesliga	26	0	4	0	1	0	31	0
Red Bull Salzburg	2013–14	Austrian Bundesliga	32	4	6	1	13	0	51	1
Red Bull Salzburg	2014–15	Austrian Bundesliga	31	0	5	0	9	0	45	0
Red Bull Salzburg	Total		89	4	15	1	23	0	127	4
RB Leipzig	2015–16	2. Bundesliga	26	1	2	0	—		28	1
RB Leipzig	2016–17	Bundesliga	33	0	1	0	—		34	0
RB Leipzig	2017–18	Bundesliga	21	0	1	0	6	0	28	0
RB Leipzig	2018–19	Bundesliga	19	0	4	0	11	0	34	0
RB Leipzig	2019–20	Bundesliga	6	0	1	0	0	0	7	0
RB Leipzig	Total		105	1	9	0	17	0	131	1
Eintracht Frankfurt	2019–20	Bundesliga	12	2	2	0	4	0	18	2
Eintracht Frankfurt	2020–21	Bundesliga	27	1	2	0	—		29	1
Eintracht Frankfurt	2021–22	Bundesliga	12	0	0	0	2	0	14	0
Eintracht Frankfurt	Total		51	3	4	0	6	0	61	3
Genoa	2022–23	Serie B	16	0	0	0	—		16	0
Career total			387	12	40	1	47	0	473	13

== Honours ==
Red Bull Salzburg

- Austrian Bundesliga: 2013–14, 2014–15
- Austrian Cup: 2013–14

Eintracht Frankfurt

- UEFA Europa League: 2021–22
