= Schöpf =

Schöpf is a surname. Notable people with the surname include:

- Alessandro Schöpf, Austrian football player
- Egon Schöpf, Austrian alpine skier
- Oliver Schöpf, Austrian football player
- Regina Schöpf, Austrian alpine skier
- Riccardo Schöpf, Austrian luger
- Stefan Schöpf, Austrian luger

== See also ==
- Schöpf-Schulz-Passarge syndrome, an autosomal disorder
- Johann David Schoepff (1752–1800), German botanist, zoologist, and physician
- Schopf
