= Alexander Walke =

German footballer (born 1983)

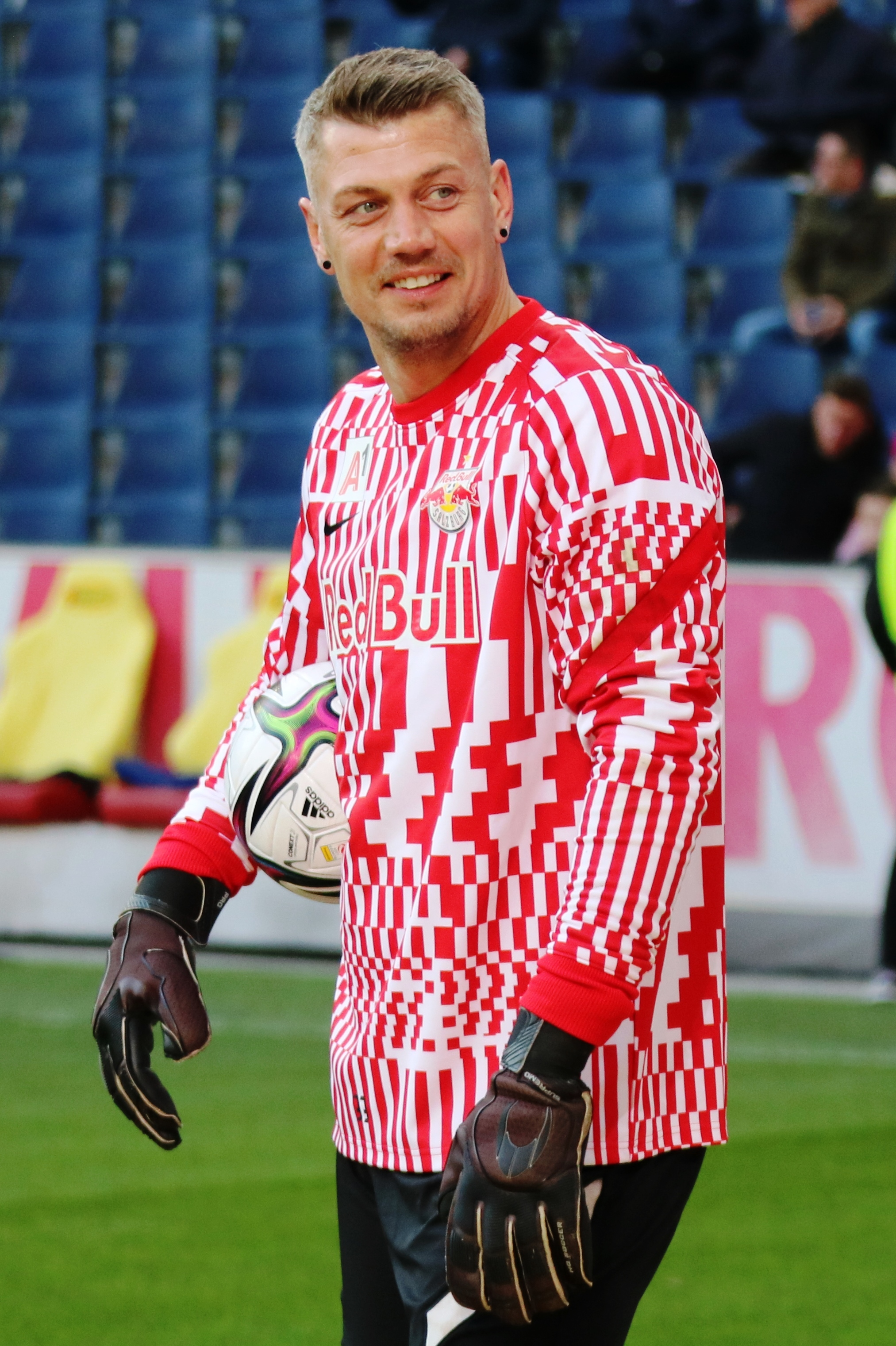
- Walke with Red Bull Salzburg in 2022

Personal information
- Date of birth: 6 June 1983 (age 43)
- Place of birth: Oranienburg, East Germany
- Height: 1.89 m (6 ft 2 in)
- Position: Goalkeeper

Team information
- Current team: Red Bull Salzburg (goalkeeping coach)

Youth career
- –1997: Eintracht Oranienburg
- 1997–1999: Energie Cottbus
- 1999–2003: Werder Bremen

Senior career*
| Years | Team | Apps | (Gls) |
| 2003–2005 | Werder Bremen | 0 | (0) |
| 2005–2008 | SC Freiburg | 74 | (0) |
| 2008–2009 | Wehen Wiesbaden | 34 | (0) |
| 2009–2010 | Hansa Rostock | 34 | (0) |
| 2010–2023 | Red Bull Salzburg | 158 | (0) |
| 2011 | → Greuther Fürth (loan) | 16 | (0) |
| Total | | 242 | (0) |

International career
| 2002 | Germany U-20 | 3 | (0) |
| 2003 | Germany U-21 | 2 | (0) |
- * Club domestic league appearances and goals

Alexander Walke (born 6 June 1983) is a German former professional footballer who played as a goalkeeper. He currently serves as the goalkeeping coach of Austrian Bundesliga club Red Bull Salzburg.

== Club career ==
Born in Oranienburg, Brandenburg, Walke began his career at Energie Cottbus as a 14-year-old. In 1999, he transferred to Werder Bremen, and was called up to the professional team in 2003. After six years, Walke moved to Baden-Württemberg in 2005 from Werder Bremen to join SC Freiburg. In 2008, he transferred to SV Wehen Wiesbaden. Walke left SV Wehen Wiesbaden to the end of the 2008–09 season. On 28 May 2009, he signed a two-year contract with FC Hansa Rostock where he played in all 36 games.

In 2010, Walke left Germany to sign for Austrian Bundesliga champion Red Bull Salzburg. He was the third German-born goalkeeper for the 2010–11 season, behind Niclas Heimann and Gerhard Tremmel. After one year on loan at Greuther Fürth in the 2. Bundesliga, he returned to Salzburg for the 2011–12 season, taking over the number 1 position from Eddie Gustafsson.

During the 2017–18 season, Salzburg had their best ever European campaign. They finished top of their UEFA Europa League group, for a record fourth time, before beating Real Sociedad and Borussia Dortmund and making their first ever appearance in the UEFA Europa League semi-final. On 3 May 2018, he played in the Europa League semi-finals as Marseille played out a 1–2 away loss but a 3–2 aggregate win to secure a place in the 2018 UEFA Europa League Final.

He retired in 2023 as a legend of Red Bull Salzburg, and will stay on as a youth goalkeeping coach.

== International career ==
He competed for Germany at the FIFA World Youth Championship 2003, but tested positive for tetrahydrocannabinol, the active chemical in marijuana.

== Career statistics ==
Appearances and goals by club, season and competition
| Club | Season | League | | | National cup (Note: Includes DFB-Pokal, Austrian Cup) | | Continental | | Other | | Total | |
| Club | Season | Division | Apps | Goals | Apps | Goals | Apps | Goals | Apps | Goals | Apps | Goals |
|---|---|---|---|---|---|---|---|---|---|---|---|---|
| Werder Bremen II | 2001–02 | Regionalliga Nord | 5 | 0 | — | | — | | — | | 5 | 0 |
| Werder Bremen II | 2002–03 | Regionalliga Nord | 20 | 0 | — | | — | | — | | 20 | 0 |
| Werder Bremen II | 2003–04 | Regionalliga Nord | 12 | 0 | — | | — | | — | | 12 | 0 |
| Werder Bremen II | 2004–05 | Regionalliga Nord | 17 | 0 | 1 | 0 | — | | — | | 18 | 0 |
| Werder Bremen II | Total | | 54 | 0 | 1 | 0 | — | | — | | 55 | 0 |
| Werder Bremen | 2004–05 | Bundesliga | 0 | 0 | 0 | 0 | 0 | 0 | — | | 0 | 0 |
| SC Freiburg | 2005–06 | 2. Bundesliga | 29 | 0 | 3 | 0 | — | | — | | 32 | 0 |
| SC Freiburg | 2006–07 | 2. Bundesliga | 33 | 0 | 2 | 0 | — | | — | | 35 | 0 |
| SC Freiburg | 2007–08 | 2. Bundesliga | 12 | 0 | 1 | 0 | — | | — | | 13 | 0 |
| SC Freiburg | Total | | 74 | 0 | 6 | 0 | — | | — | | 80 | 0 |
| SC Freiburg II | 2007–08 | Oberliga Baden-Württemberg | 15 | 0 | — | | — | | — | | 15 | 0 |
| Wehen Wiesbaden | 2008–09 | 2. Bundesliga | 34 | 0 | 4 | 0 | — | | — | | 38 | 0 |
| Hansa Rostock | 2009–10 | 2. Bundesliga | 34 | 0 | 1 | 0 | — | | 2 (Note: Appearances in 2. Bundesliga relegation play-offs) | 0 | 37 | 0 |
| Red Bull Salzburg | 2010–11 | Austrian Bundesliga | 0 | 0 | 2 | 0 | 2 (Note: One appearance in UEFA Champions League, one appearance in UEFA Europa League) | 0 | — | | 4 | 0 |
| Red Bull Salzburg | 2011–12 | Austrian Bundesliga | 21 | 0 | 5 | 0 | 5 (Note: Appearances in UEFA Europa League) | 0 | — | | 31 | 0 |
| Red Bull Salzburg | 2012–13 | Austrian Bundesliga | 30 | 0 | 1 | 0 | 2 (Note: Appearances in UEFA Champions League) | 0 | — | | 33 | 0 |
| Red Bull Salzburg | 2013–14 | Austrian Bundesliga | 7 | 0 | 1 | 0 | 0 | 0 | — | | 8 | 0 |
| Red Bull Salzburg | 2014–15 | Austrian Bundesliga | 3 | 0 | 2 | 0 | 1 | 0 | — | | 6 | 0 |
| Red Bull Salzburg | 2015–16 | Austrian Bundesliga | 31 | 0 | 4 | 0 | 2 | 0 | — | | 37 | 0 |
| Red Bull Salzburg | 2016–17 | Austrian Bundesliga | 34 | 0 | 4 | 0 | 11 (Note: Six appearances in UEFA Champions League, five appearances in UEFA Europa League) | 0 | — | | 49 | 0 |
| Red Bull Salzburg | 2017–18 | Austrian Bundesliga | 25 | 0 | 0 | 0 | 17 (Note: Three appearances in UEFA Champions League, fourteen appearances in UEFA Europa League) | 0 | — | | 42 | 0 |
| Red Bull Salzburg | 2018–19 | Austrian Bundesliga | 4 | 0 | 5 | 0 | 10 | 0 | — | | 19 | 0 |
| Red Bull Salzburg | 2019–20 | Austrian Bundesliga | 0 | 0 | 0 | 0 | 0 | 0 | — | | 0 | 0 |
| Red Bull Salzburg | 2020–21 | Austrian Bundesliga | 0 | 0 | 0 | 0 | 0 | 0 | — | | 0 | 0 |
| Red Bull Salzburg | 2021–22 | Austrian Bundesliga | 1 | 0 | 0 | 0 | 0 | 0 | — | | 1 | 0 |
| Red Bull Salzburg | 2022–23 | Austrian Bundesliga | 1 | 0 | 0 | 0 | 0 | 0 | — | | 1 | 0 |
| Red Bull Salzburg | Total | | 157 | 0 | 24 | 0 | 50 | 0 | — | | 231 | 0 |
| Greuther Fürth (loan) | 2010–11 | 2. Bundesliga | 16 | 0 | 0 | 0 | — | | — | | 16 | 0 |
| Career total | | | 384 | 0 | 36 | 0 | 50 | 0 | 2 | 0 | 472 | 0 |

== Honours ==
Red Bull Salzburg

- Austrian Bundesliga: 2011–12, 2013–14, 2014–15, 2015–16, 2016–17, 2017–18, 2018–19, 2019–20, 2020–21, 2021–22, 2022–23
- Austrian Cup: 2011–12, 2013–14, 2014–15, 2015–16, 2016–17, 2018–19, 2019–20, 2020–21, 2021–22

== See also ==
- List of sportspeople sanctioned for doping offences
