= Eddie Gustafsson =

Swedish footballer (born 1977)

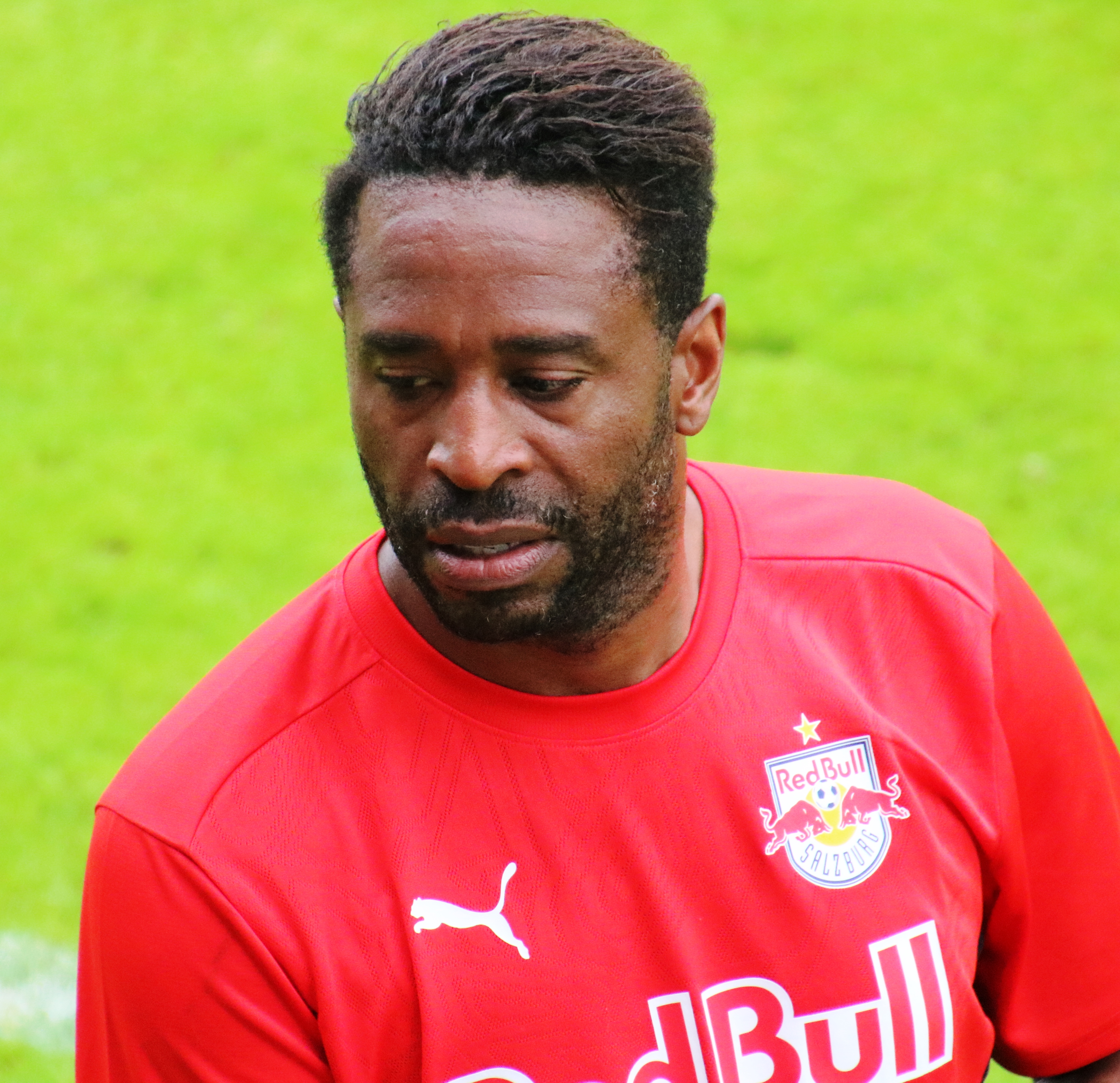
- Gustafsson in 2024

Personal information
- Full name: Douglas Edward Alexander; Gustafsson McIntosh
- Date of birth: 31 January 1977 (age 49)
- Place of birth: Philadelphia, Pennsylvania, United States
- Height: 1.87 m (6 ft 1 1/2 in)
- Position: Goalkeeper

Youth career
- IFK Stockholm

Senior career*
Years	Team	Apps	(Gls)
1993–1994	IFK Stockholm	5	(0)
1995–2001	IFK Norrköping	86	(0)
2002–2004	Molde	71	(0)
2005	Ham-Kam	26	(0)
2006–2009	Lyn Oslo	63	(0)
2009–2014	Red Bull Salzburg	69	(0)
Total		320	(0)

International career
1994–1995	Sweden U18	7	(0)
1996–1999	Sweden U21	22	(0)
2000–2010	Sweden	10	(0)
- * Club domestic league appearances and goals

Douglas Edward Alexander "Eddie" Gustafsson McIntosh (born 31 January 1977) is a former professional footballer who played as a goalkeeper. Starting off his career with IFK Stockholm in 1993, he went on to play professionally in Norway for three clubs and in Austria for Red Bull Salzburg before retiring in 2014. Born in the United States, he won ten caps for the Sweden national team.

== Career ==
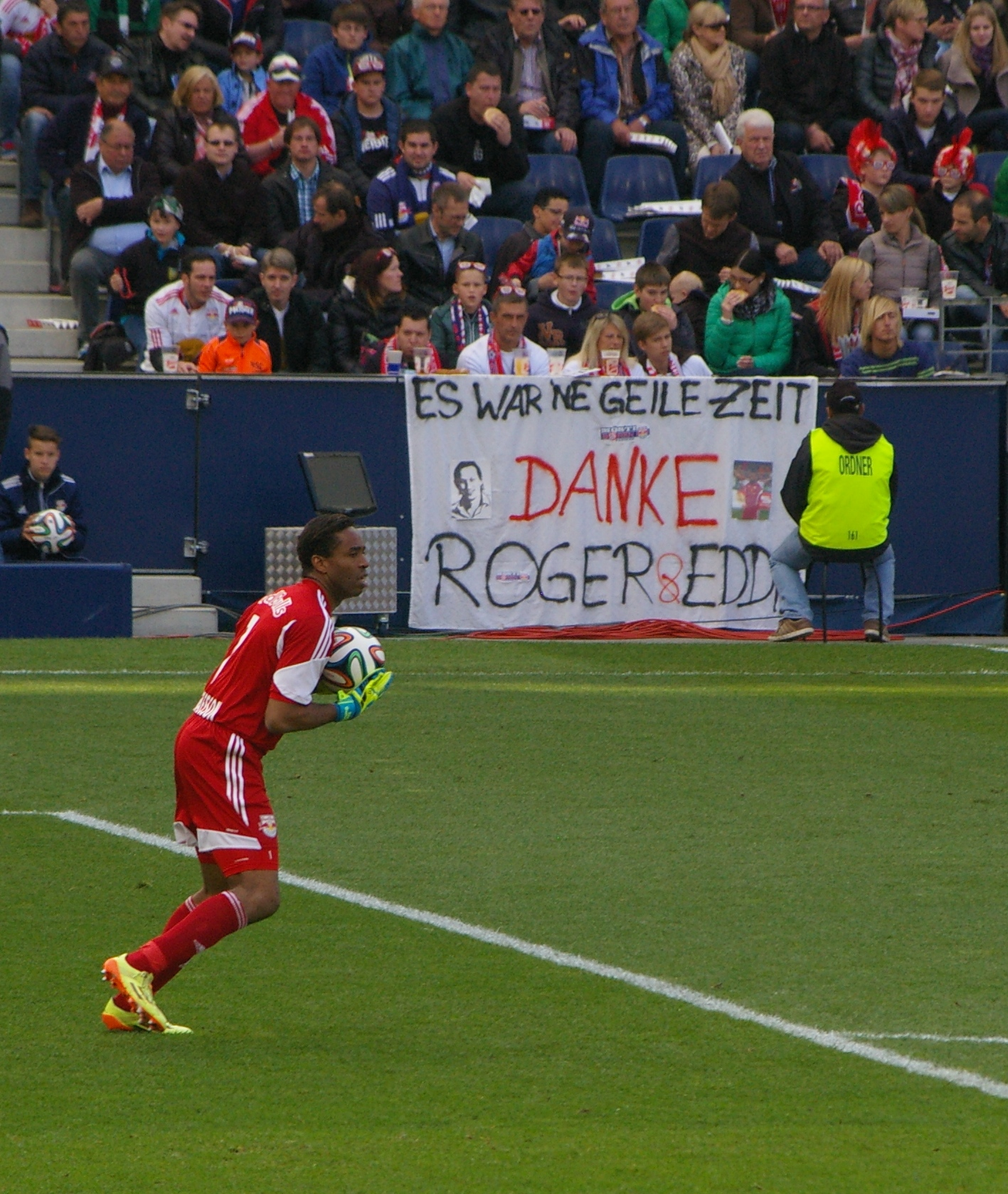
Eddie Gustafsson in his last match versus SV Ried in May 2014.

=== Early career ===
Gustafsson grew up in the United States before he moved to Sweden where he started playing for IFK Stockholm and IFK Norrköping before transferring to Norway in 2002, playing for Molde FK. He was their first choice for three seasons, but as his contract expired after the 2004 season he decided to find a new club. He went on several fruitless trials for clubs in Europe and the US, and joined another Norwegian club, Hamarkameratene. The stay only lasted for year. After the 2005 season, Gustafsson signed with FK Lyn.

=== Red Bull Salzburg ===
On 8 January 2009 it was announced that Gustafsson had signed a contract with FC Red Bull Salzburg.

On 18 April 2010, in an Austrian Bundesliga match against LASK Linz, Gustafsson broke his leg when fouled by Linz forward Lukas Kragl. As Gustafsson went to clear the ball following a through pass, Kragl tried to block but was late and caught Gustafsson midway up his left shin. Gustafsson broke both his tibia and fibula in the tackle. Kragl only received a yellow card for the tackle, whilst the same punishment was given to Gustafsson's teammate Christoph Leitgeb for his reaction towards Kragl following the foul. Gustafsson underwent surgery the same night.

Gustafsson celebrated his first post-injury appearance in a midseason friendly against FC Spartak Moscow on 20 January 2011. Over the following years, Gustafsson never fully achieved a comeback to the starting lineup, instead filling the role of backup goalkeeper behind Alexander Walke and later Péter Gulácsi.

Gustafsson last appeared as a goalkeeper in Salzburg's final 2013-2014 Bundesliga home match on 4 May 2014 against SV Ried. He was substituted by Péter Gulácsi in the 78th minute, marking his retirement from professional football.

== International career ==
Gustafsson made his debut for Sweden on 31 January 2000 in a 1–0 win against Denmark. He was a stand-by player for UEFA Euro 2004 and 2008. He played a total of ten games for Sweden between 2000 and 2010.

== Career statistics ==
=== International ===
Appearances and goals by national team and year
National team	Year	Apps	Goals
Sweden	2000	1	0
Sweden	2001	1	0
Sweden	2002	0	0
Sweden	2003	2	0
Sweden	2004	0	0
Sweden	2005	3	0
Sweden	2006	1	0
Sweden	2007	0	0
Sweden	2008	0	0
Sweden	2009	1	0
Sweden	2010	1	0
Total		10	0

== Honors ==
Red Bull Salzburg

- Austrian League: 2008–09, 2009–10, 2011–12, 2013–14
- Austrian Cup: 2011–12, 2013–14

Sweden

- King's Cup: 2003

Individual

- Goalkeeper of the year (Norway): 2008
- Goalkeeper of the year (Austria): 2010
