= Rodnei =

Brazilian footballer

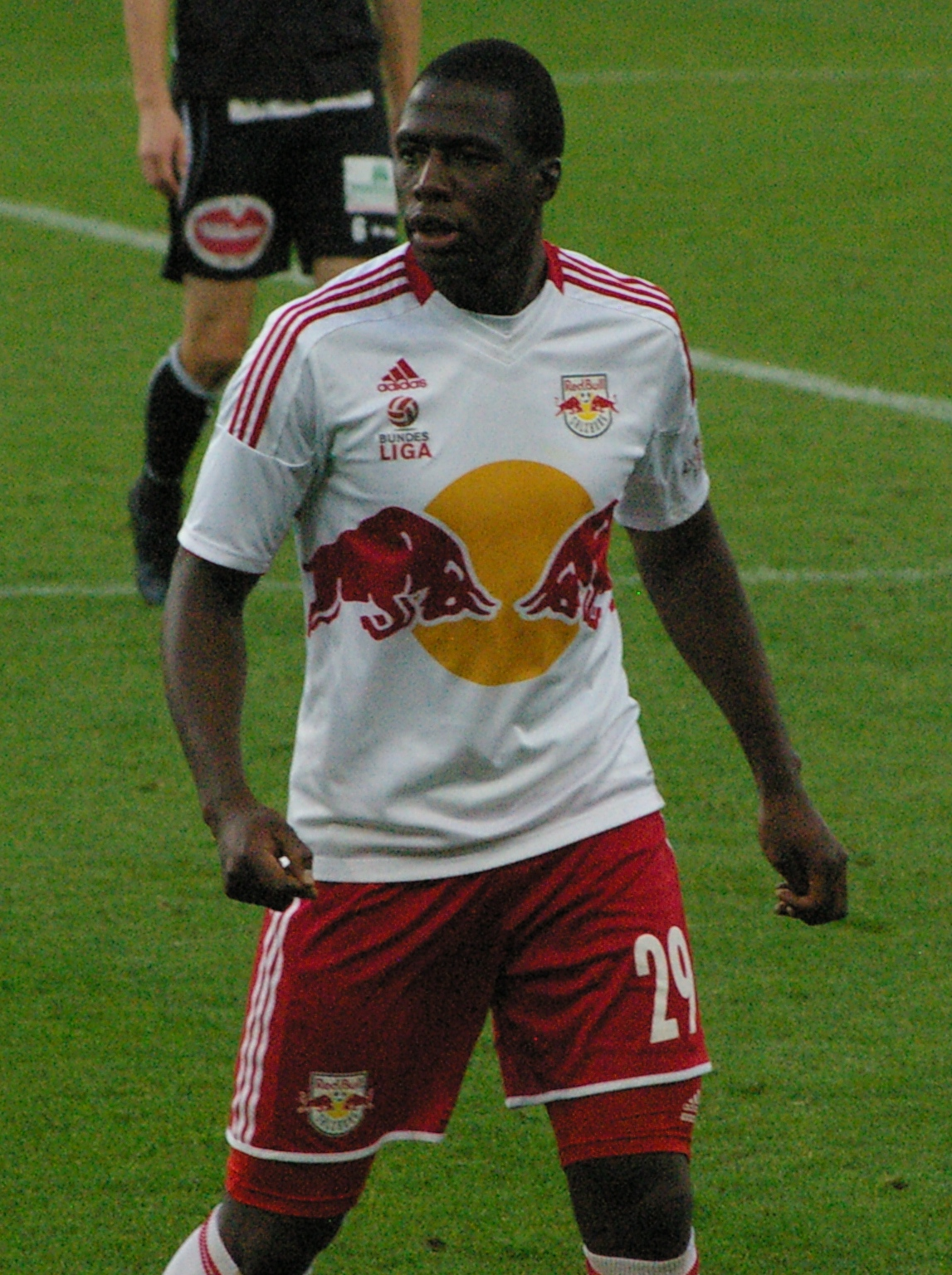
- Rodnei in 2012

Personal information
- Full name: Rodnei Francisco de Lima
- Date of birth: 11 September 1985 (age 41)
- Place of birth: São Paulo, Brazil
- Height: 1.90 m (6 ft 3 in)
- Position: Centre-back

Team information
- Current team: SV Anthering
- Number: 14

Youth career
- CA Juventus

Senior career*
Years	Team	Apps	(Gls)
2005–2006	CA Juventus		
2006–2007	Vilnius	46	(7)
2007–2008	Pão de Açúcar		
2007	→ Jagiellonia Białystok (loan)	11	(0)
2008–2010	Hertha BSC	9	(0)
2009–2010	→ 1. FC Kaiserslautern (loan)	34	(5)
2010–2012	1. FC Kaiserslautern	48	(3)
2012–2015	Red Bull Salzburg	23	(0)
2015	→ RB Leipzig (loan)	6	(1)
2015–2017	1860 Munich	8	(0)
2018	Blau-Weiß Linz	10	(0)
2020–	SV Anthering	7	(0)
- * Club domestic league appearances and goals as of 21:15, 9 March 2021 (UTC)

Rodnei Francisco de Lima (born 11 September 1985), commonly known as Rodnei, is a Brazilian professional footballer who plays as a centre-back for Austrian club SV Anthering.

== Career ==
Rodnei made his Bundesliga debut for Hertha on 14 February 2009 against Bayern Munich, a match that Hertha won, leaving them in first place in the Bundesliga.

On 25 July 2009, Rodnei was loaned to 1. FC Kaiserslautern until the end of the 2009–10 season. In 2012, he went on to FC Red Bull Salzburg in the Austrian Bundesliga.

In February 2015, Rodnei joined RB Leipzig on loan. Ahead of the 2015–16 season he signed a contract with 2. Bundesliga club 1860 Munich. His contract was terminated in 2017.

== Honours ==
Red Bull Salzburg

- Austrian Bundesliga: 2013–14
