= Mario Pollhammer =

Austrian footballer

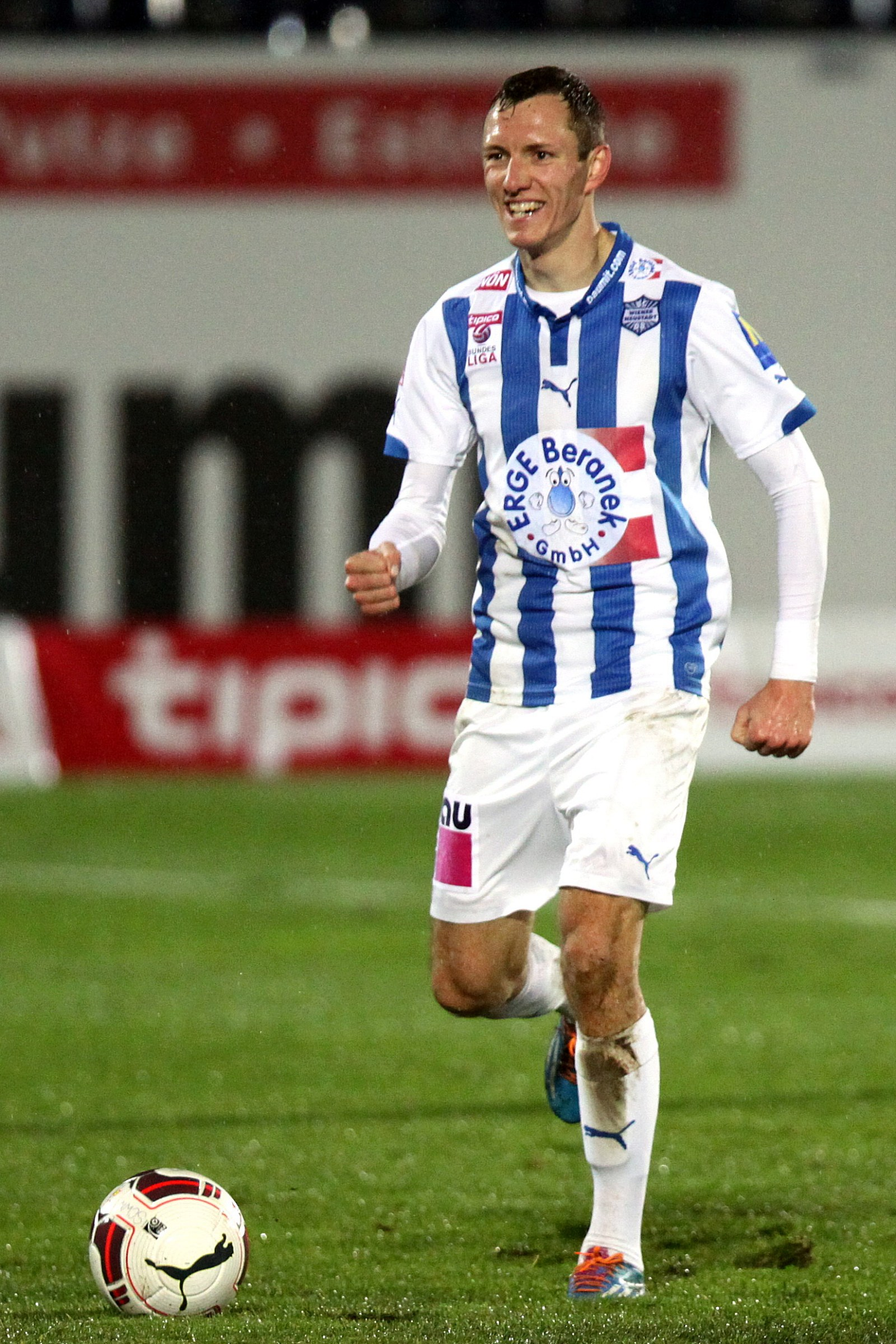
- Pollhammer in 2014

Personal information
- Full name: Mario Pollhammer
- Date of birth: 20 June 1989 (age 37)
- Place of birth: Feldbach, Austria
- Height: 1.80 m (5 ft 11 in)
- Position: Right-back

Team information
- Current team: FC Gleisdorf 09
- Number: 17

Senior career*
| Years | Team | Apps | (Gls) |
| 2007–2010 | SV Allerheiligen | 82 | (9) |
| 2010–2011 | Grazer AK | 29 | (4) |
| 2011–2015 | Wiener Neustadt | 114 | (2) |
| 2015–2017 | SC Ritzing | 51 | (1) |
| 2017– | FC Gleisdorf 09 | 18 | (1) |
- * Club domestic league appearances and goals as of 31 March 2018

Mario Pollhammer (born 20 June 1989) is an Austrian footballer who plays as a right-back. He played in the Austrian Bundesliga for Wiener Neustadt.
