= Marco Meilinger =

Austrian footballer (born 1991)

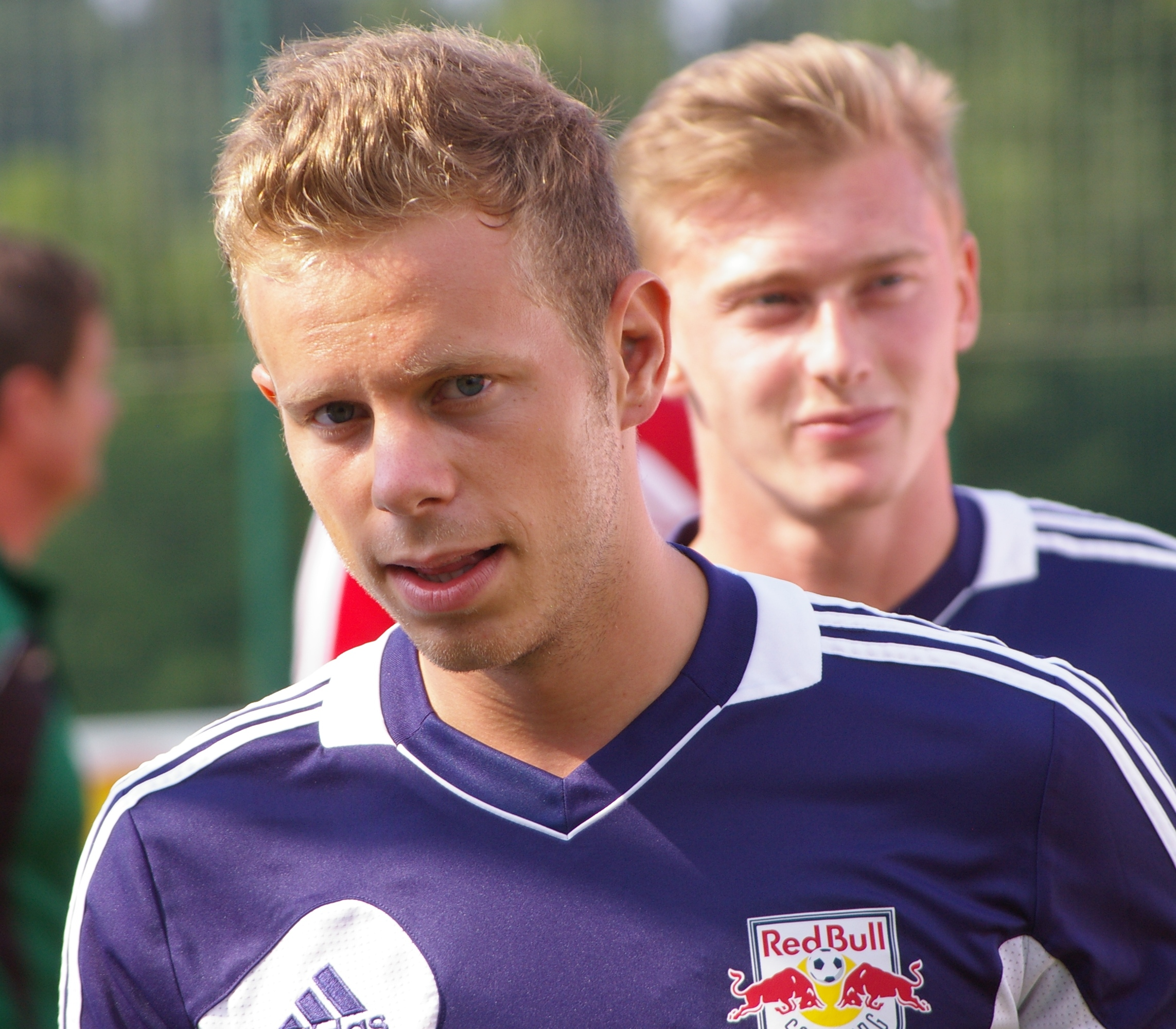

Personal information
- Date of birth: 8 August 1991 (age 35)
- Place of birth: Salzburg, Austria
- Height: 1.80 m (5 ft 11 in)
- Position: Midfielder

Team information
- Current team: Union Vöcklamarkt
- Number: 7

Youth career
- –2002: USK Anif
- 2002–2005: SV Austria Salzburg
- 2005–2009: Red Bull Salzburg

Senior career*
Years	Team	Apps	(Gls)
2009–2011	Red Bull Juniors Salzburg	54	(15)
2011–2014	Red Bull Salzburg	16	(0)
2011–2013	→ SV Ried (loan)	62	(8)
2014–2016	Austria Wien	45	(2)
2016–2017	AaB	27	(3)
2018–2022	Rheindorf Altach	77	(4)
2023–	Union Vöcklamarkt	23	(3)

International career
2008	Austria U18	1	(0)
2009–2010	Austria U19	5	(0)
2010–2011	Austria U20	3	(0)
2011–2012	Austria U21	3	(0)
- * Club domestic league appearances and goals as of 09:56, 20 January 2024 (UTC)

Marco Meilinger (born 8 August 1991) is an Austrian footballer who plays as a midfielder for Austrian Regionalliga Central club Union Vöcklamarkt.

== Club career ==
He started playing football with USK Anif, a team from a suburb of Salzburg. In 2002, he went to Austria Salzburg, and 2005, after the club was bought by Red Bull, he played with FC Red Bull Salzburg. In 2009, he played for the second team of Red Bull Salzburg, Red Bull Juniors. He signed with FC Red Bull Salzburg in 2010. In August 2011, he was loaned to SV Ried and had a two-year loan spell at the club. In 2014, he signed with Austria Wien. In 2016 Meilinger signed with the Danish club AaB, ready to try a new country and a new league.

On 7 December 2022, Meilinger signed with Austrian Regionalliga Central club Union Vöcklamarkt, starting from 1 January 2023.

== International career ==
Since 2008 Marco Meilinger played for Austria in different youth teams. In 2010, he played with the U 19 team in the European Championship in France and is qualified with the team for the U 20 World championship in 2011.
