= Philipp Hütter =

Austrian footballer

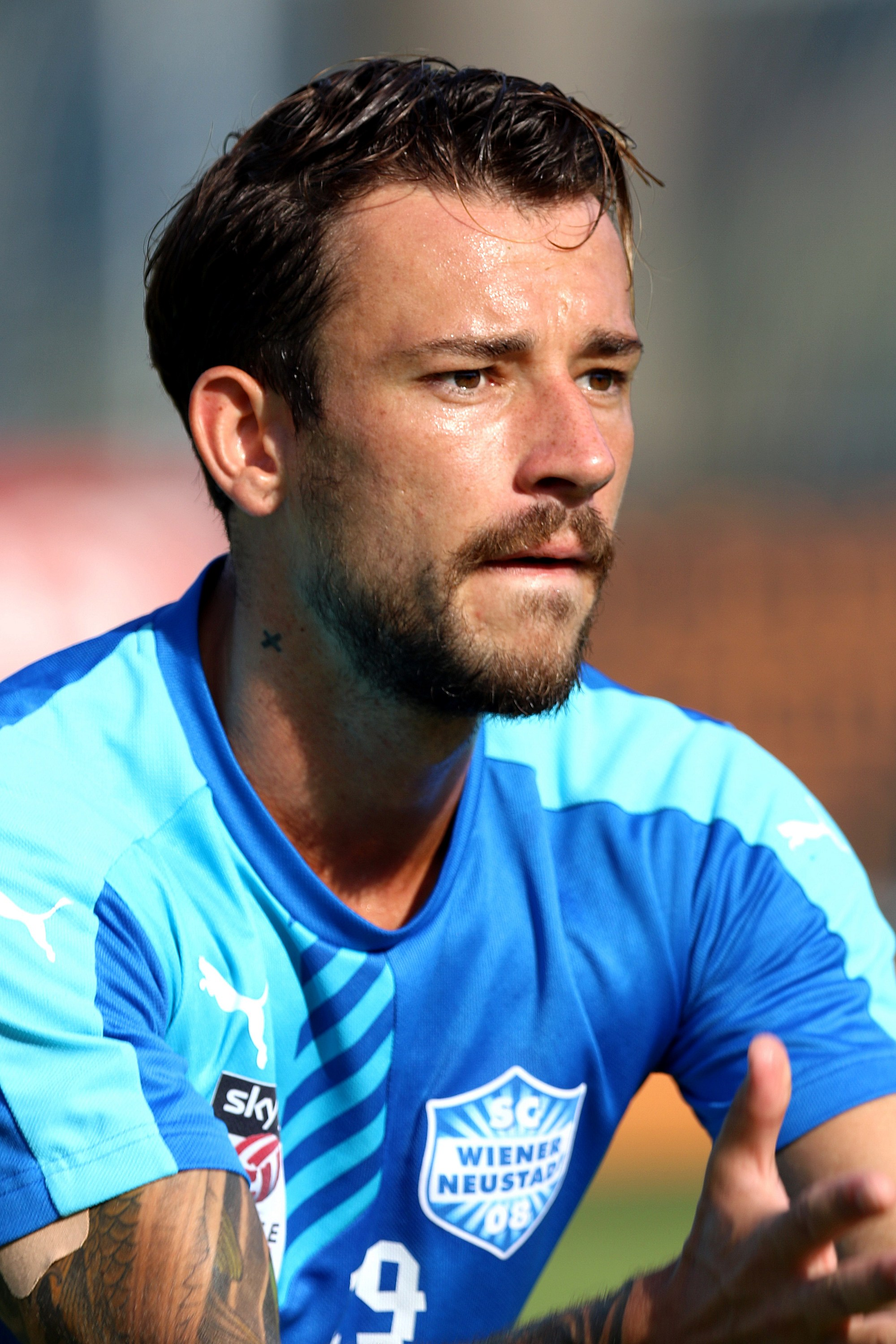
- Hütter with Wiener Neustadt in 2016

Personal information
- Date of birth: 17 August 1990 (age 36)
- Place of birth: Bruck an der Mur, Austria
- Height: 1.81 m (5 ft 11 in)
- Position: Midfielder

Team information
- Current team: SV Lebring
- Number: 27

Youth career
- 1996–2002: UFC Passail
- 2002–2007: Sturm Graz

Senior career*
| Years | Team | Apps | (Gls) |
| 2007–2014 | Sturm Graz II | 106 | (3) |
| 2013–2014 | Sturm Graz | 11 | (0) |
| 2015 | SV Kapfenberg | 12 | (1) |
| 2015–2017 | Wiener Neustadt | 28 | (0) |
| 2017–2021 | Austria Klagenfurt | 100 | (6) |
| 2022–2023 | DSV Leoben | 36 | (14) |
| 2023–2024 | Kapfenberger SV | 4 | (0) |
| 2024– | SV Lebring | 6 | (3) |
- * Club domestic league appearances and goals as of 6 September 2024

Philipp Hütter (born 17 August 1990) is an Austrian professional footballer who plays as a midfielder for Landesliga Steiermark club SV Lebring.

== Club career ==
Hütter signed his professional contract with SK Sturm Graz in 2012.

On 20 December 2021, Hütter joined DSV Leoben in the fourth-tier Landesliga Steiermark.
