= Dominique Taboga =

Association footballer

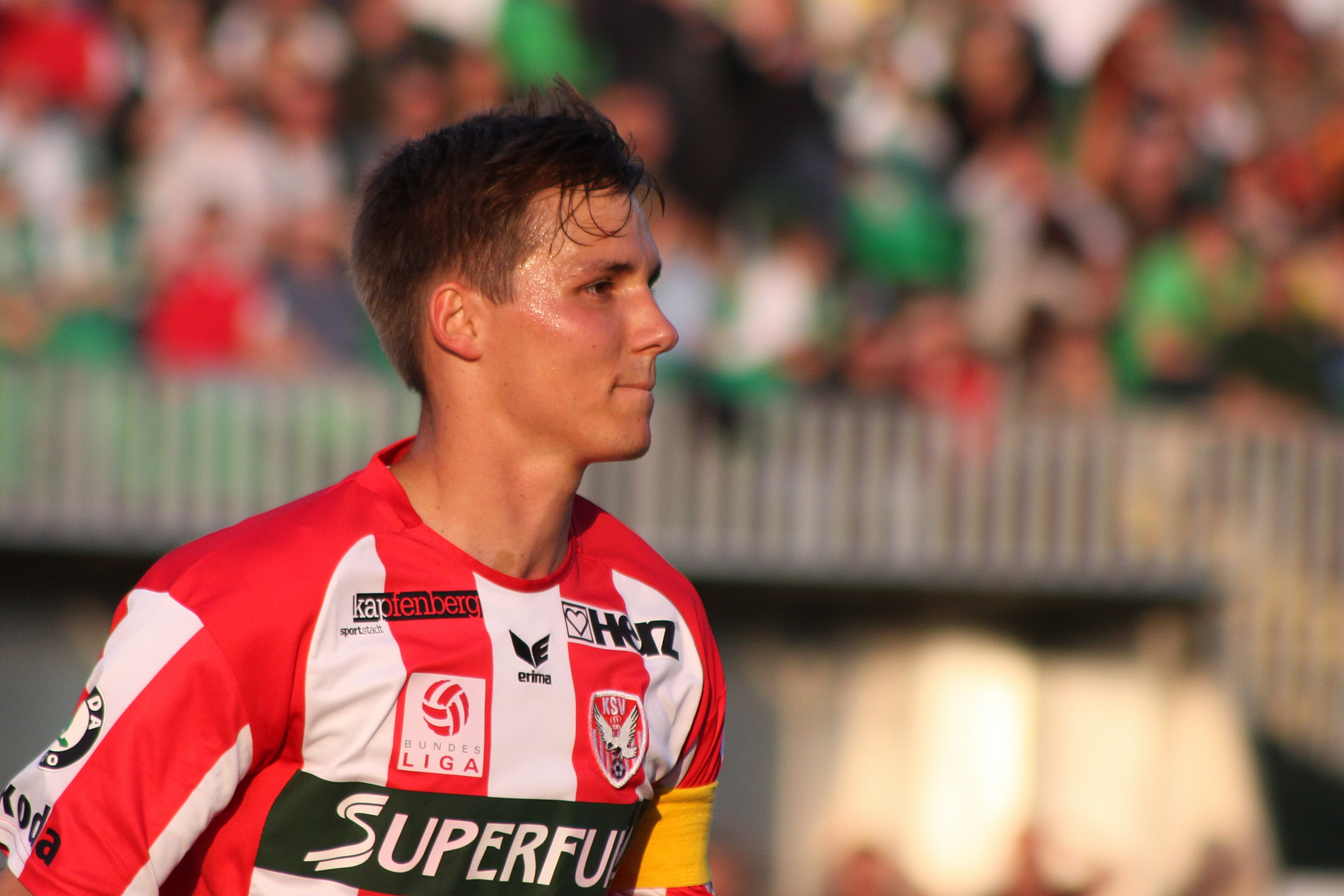
- Taboga with Kapfenberger SV

Personal information
- Date of birth: 6 November 1982 (age 43)
- Place of birth: Vienna, Austria
- Height: 1.88 m (6 ft 2 in)
- Position: Defender

Youth career
- 1991–2001: St. Pölten
- 1992–2002: ASV Spratzern
- 1997: → Admira Wacker (Loan)
- 1997–2000: Rapid Wien
- 2001–2002: Kremser SC

Senior career*
Years	Team	Apps	(Gls)
2002–2006	DSV Leoben	61	(4)
2006–2009	Kapfenberger SV	84	(10)
2009–2011	Tromsø IL	6	(0)
2010–2011	→ Kapfenberger SV (loan)	31	(1)
2011–2012	Kapfenberger SV	20	(0)
2012–2013	Grödig	15	(1)
Total		217	(16)
- * Club domestic league appearances and goals

Dominique Taboga (born 6 November 1982) is an Austrian former professional footballer who played as a defender, before his arrest in a match-fixing scandal.

== Career ==
=== Early years ===
Taboga was born in Vienna, Austria. He started his career at St. Pölten's youth team in 1991. After only one year, he moved to ASV Spratzern. In January 1997 he went on loan to Admira Wacker before returning in June 1997. He went on to play for Rapid Wien and Kremser SC.

=== Professional career ===
In 2002, he moved to DSV Leoben. He made his senior debut on 25 July 2003 in an Austrian Football First League 1–0 win. He scored his first senior goal against Wacker Innsbruck on 13 September 2003.

After over four years in Leoben, he moved to Kapfenberger SV. In the 2007–08 season, won the Austrian Football First League. He made his debut in the Austrian Football Bundesliga 1–0 win against LASK Linz on 9 July 2008.

In 2009, he moved to Norwegian side Tromsø IL on a three-year contract.

== Match fixing ==
In November 2013, Taboga claimed he was blackmailed by former Kapfenberger teammate Sanel Kuljić to fix matches forcing Kuljić to be taken into police custody. A few days later, Taboga admitted that he tried to convince four other players to manipulate a match during the 2012–13 season. He was eventually banned for life from playing, refereeing, and working as club official or player agent.

== Honours ==
- Austrian second tier: 2007–08
