= Thomas Zündel =

Austrian footballer

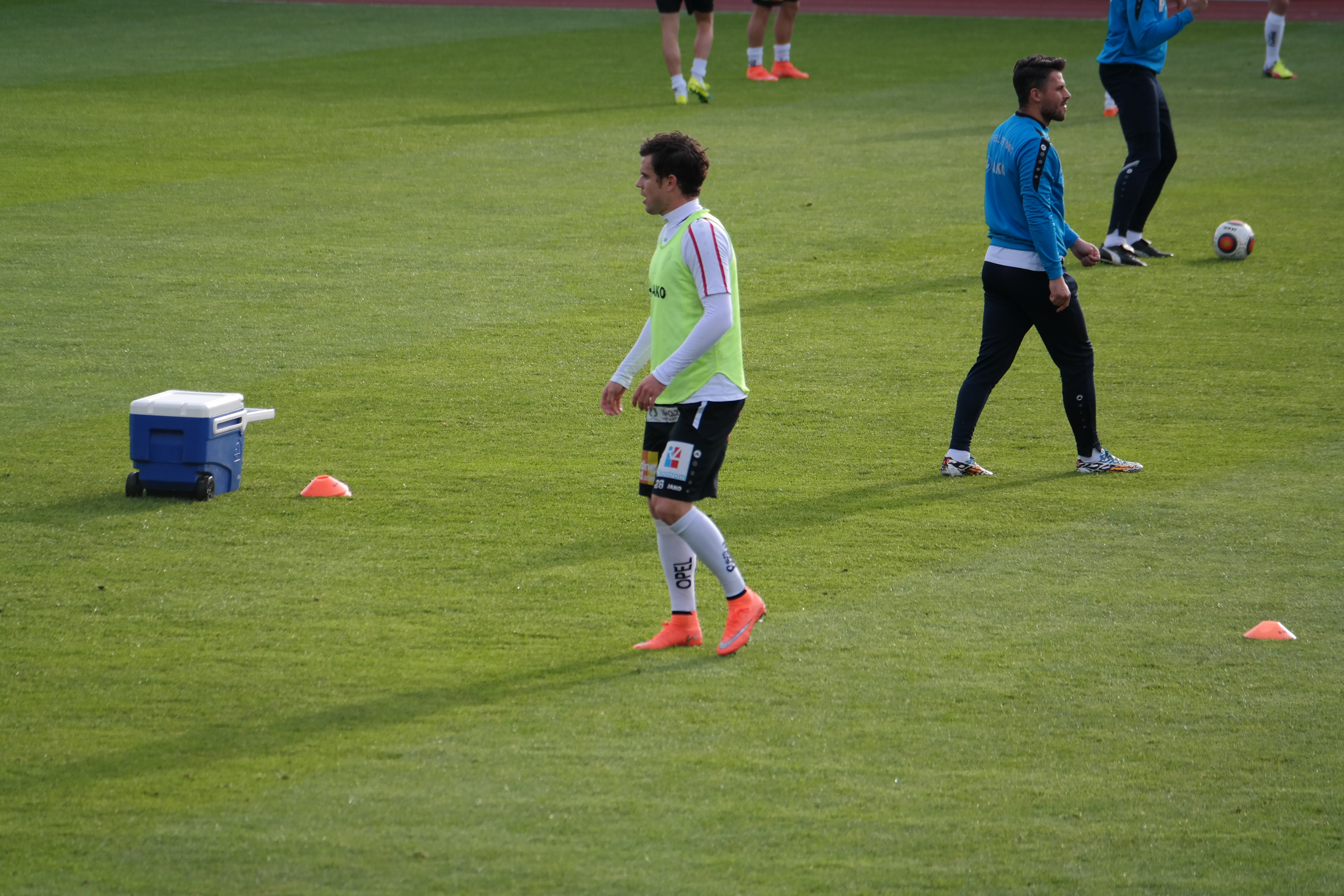
- Thomas Zündel in 2016

Personal information
- Date of birth: 24 December 1987 (age 38)
- Place of birth: Austria
- Height: 1.81 m (5 ft 11 in)
- Position: Defender

Team information
- Current team: SV Tillmitsch

Senior career*
Years	Team	Apps	(Gls)
2008–2011	FC Gratkorn	121	(5)
2011–2013	SV Grödig	53	(0)
2014–2015	SC Kalsdorf	12	(2)
2015–2019	Wolfsberger AC	26	(0)
2019–2021	Grazer AK	38	(2)
2021–	SV Tillmitsch	0	(0)
- * Club domestic league appearances and goals as of 23 May 2021

Thomas Zündel (born 24 December 1987) is an Austrian footballer who plays for SV Tillmitsch.
