= Sascha Boller =

German footballer

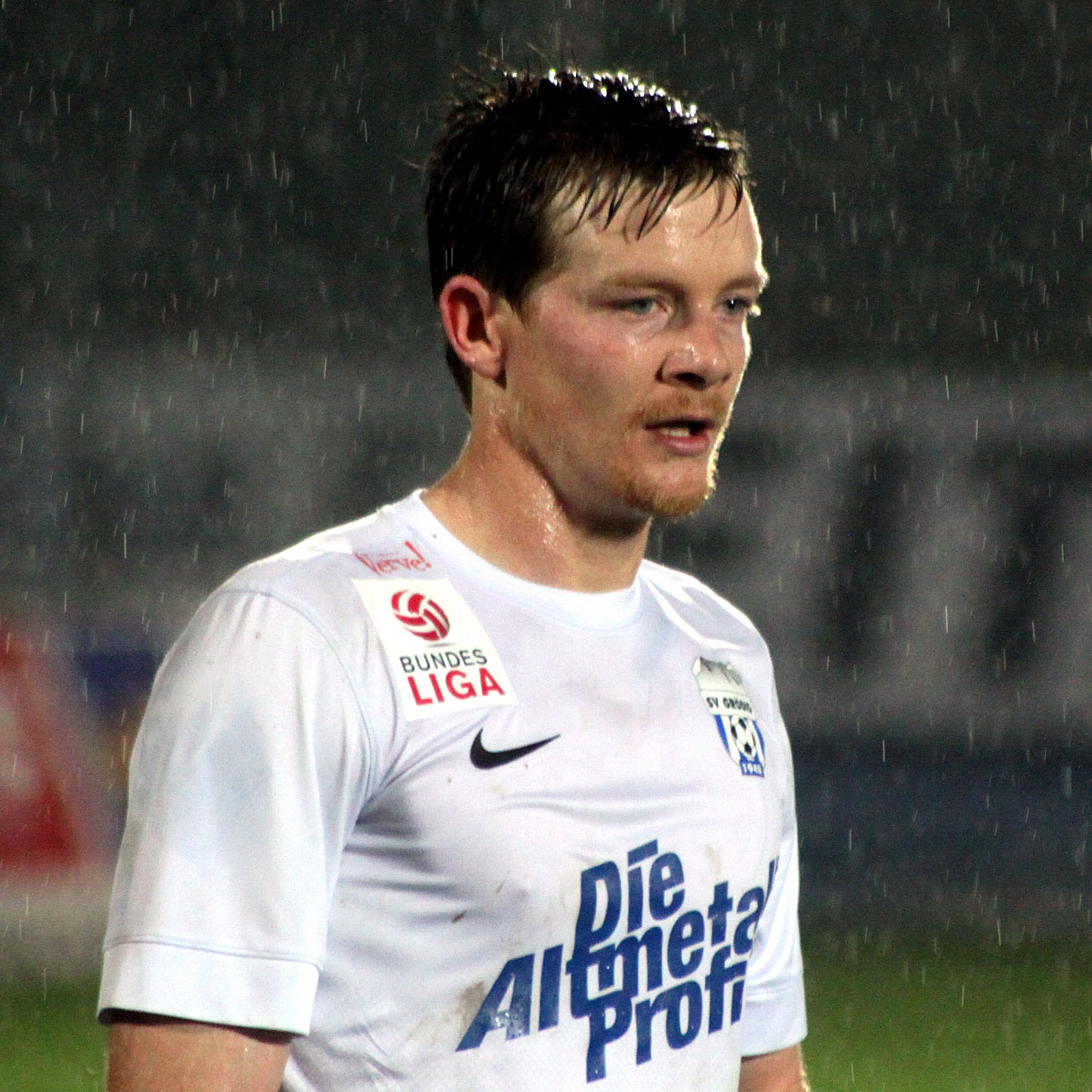
- Boller in 2013

Personal information
- Full name: Sascha Boller
- Date of birth: 16 February 1984 (age 42)
- Place of birth: Pforzheim, West Germany
- Height: 1.80 m (5 ft 11 in)
- Position: Midfielder

Youth career
- 1994: SV Hohenwart
- 1994–2001: VfB Stuttgart
- 2001–2003: Karlsruher SC

Senior career*
Years	Team	Apps	(Gls)
2003–2004	Germania Brötzingen		
2004–2008	1899 Hoffenheim II	52	(6)
2005–2007	1899 Hoffenheim	16	(2)
2008	Greuther Fürth	2	(0)
2008–2010	SSV Reutlingen	43	(7)
2010	Eintracht Frankfurt II	16	(1)
2010–2013	Austria Lustnau	76	(10)
2013–2014	SV Grödig	30	(0)
- * Club domestic league appearances and goals

Sascha Boller (born 16 February 1984) is a German former professional footballer who played as a midfielder.
