= Marco Kofler (footballer, born 1989) =

Austrian footballer

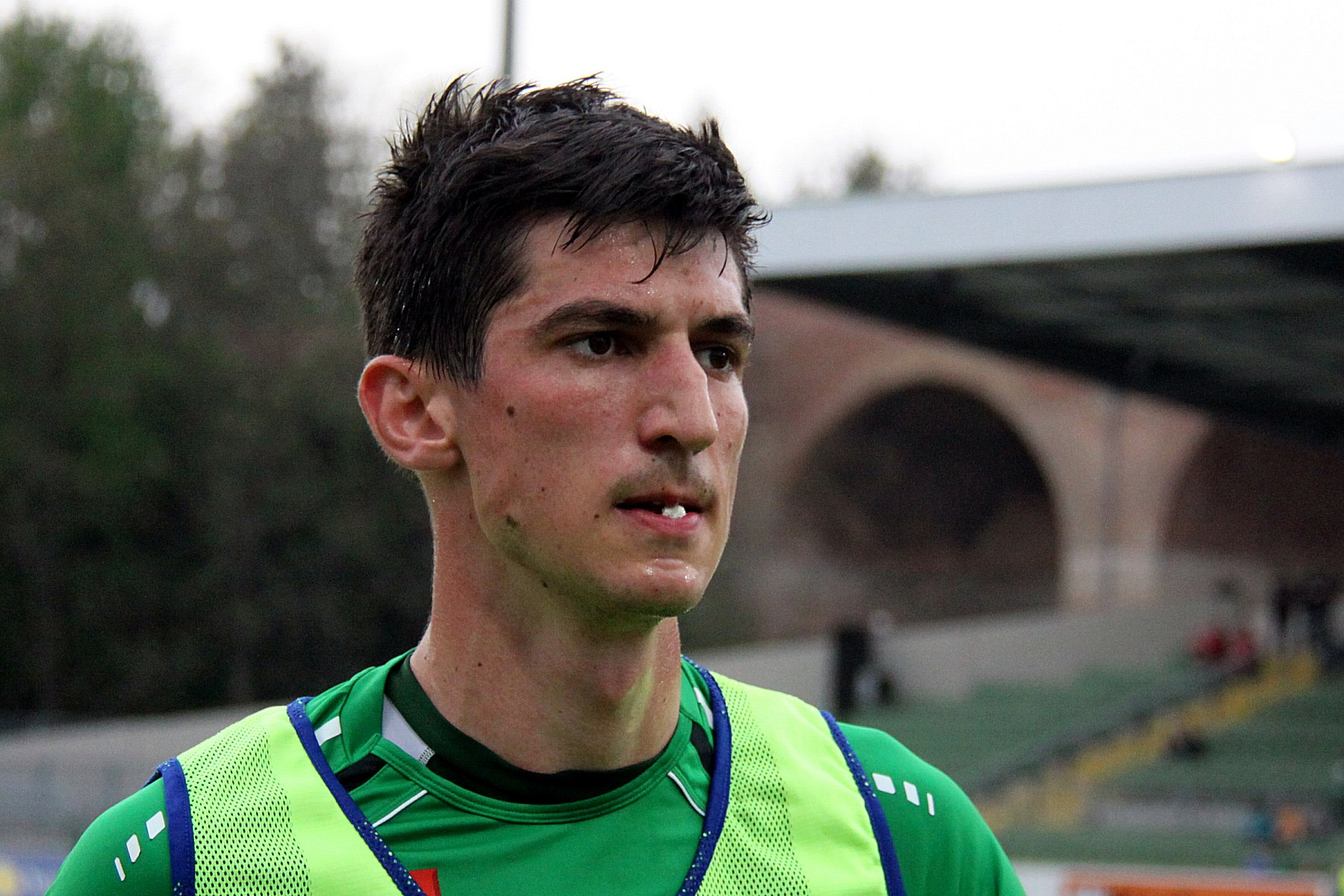

Personal information
- Full name: Marco Kofler
- Date of birth: 8 May 1989 (age 37)
- Place of birth: Innsbruck, Austria
- Height: 1.95 m (6 ft 5 in)
- Position: Centre back

Youth career
- 1996–2005: SV Matrei
- 2005–2008: SV Navis

Senior career*
Years	Team	Apps	(Gls)
2009–2015	Wacker Innsbruck	102	(3)
2015	→ Hansa Rostock (loan)	8	(0)
2015–2017	Hansa Rostock	38	(1)
2017–2019	SV Elversberg	36	(1)
2019	SV Wörgl	15	(2)
- * Club domestic league appearances and goals

Marco Kofler (born 8 May 1989) is a retired footballer from Austria. He has mainly played on the defence front in the matches.
