= Naim Sharifi =

Russian-Tajik footballer (born 1992)

Personal information
- Full name: Makhmednaim Makhmadkarimzade Sharifi
- Date of birth: 3 June 1992 (age 34)
- Place of birth: Dushanbe, Tajikistan
- Height: 1.75 m (5 ft 9 in)
- Position: Full back

Team information
- Current team: Union Ostermiething

Youth career
- 2008–2010: Lokomotiv Moscow

Senior career*
Years	Team	Apps	(Gls)
2010–2012	Kapfenberger SV	32	(0)
2012–2013	Amkar Perm	2	(0)
2013–2014	Kapfenberger SV	30	(3)
2014–2016	Sturm Graz	3	(0)
2016–2017	Kapfenberger SV	7	(0)
2017–2018	Fakel Voronezh	27	(0)
2018–2019	Jelgava	25	(0)
2020–2022	DSV Leoben	12	(0)
2022–2023	UFC Markt Allhau	26	(0)
2023–	Union Ostermiething	0	(0)

International career
2011	Russia U-19	7	(0)
2012	Russia U-20	4	(0)
- * Club domestic league appearances and goals as of 10 June 2023

Naim Sharifi (Tajik: Наим Шарифӣ; Russian: Махмаднаим Махмадкаримзаде Шарифи; born 3 June 1992) is a Russian-Tajik footballer. He plays for Austrian fourth-tier OÖ Liga club Union Ostermiething.

== Club career ==
He has played for reserves team of FC Lokomotiv Moscow in 2009 and 2010. He did not play for the professional Russian Second Division farm-club called FC Lokomotiv-2 Moscow as it is sometimes erroneously reported.

He made his debut in the Russian Premier League on 3 November 2012 for FC Amkar Perm in a game against FC Kuban Krasnodar.
