= Stefan Schwendinger =

Austrian footballer

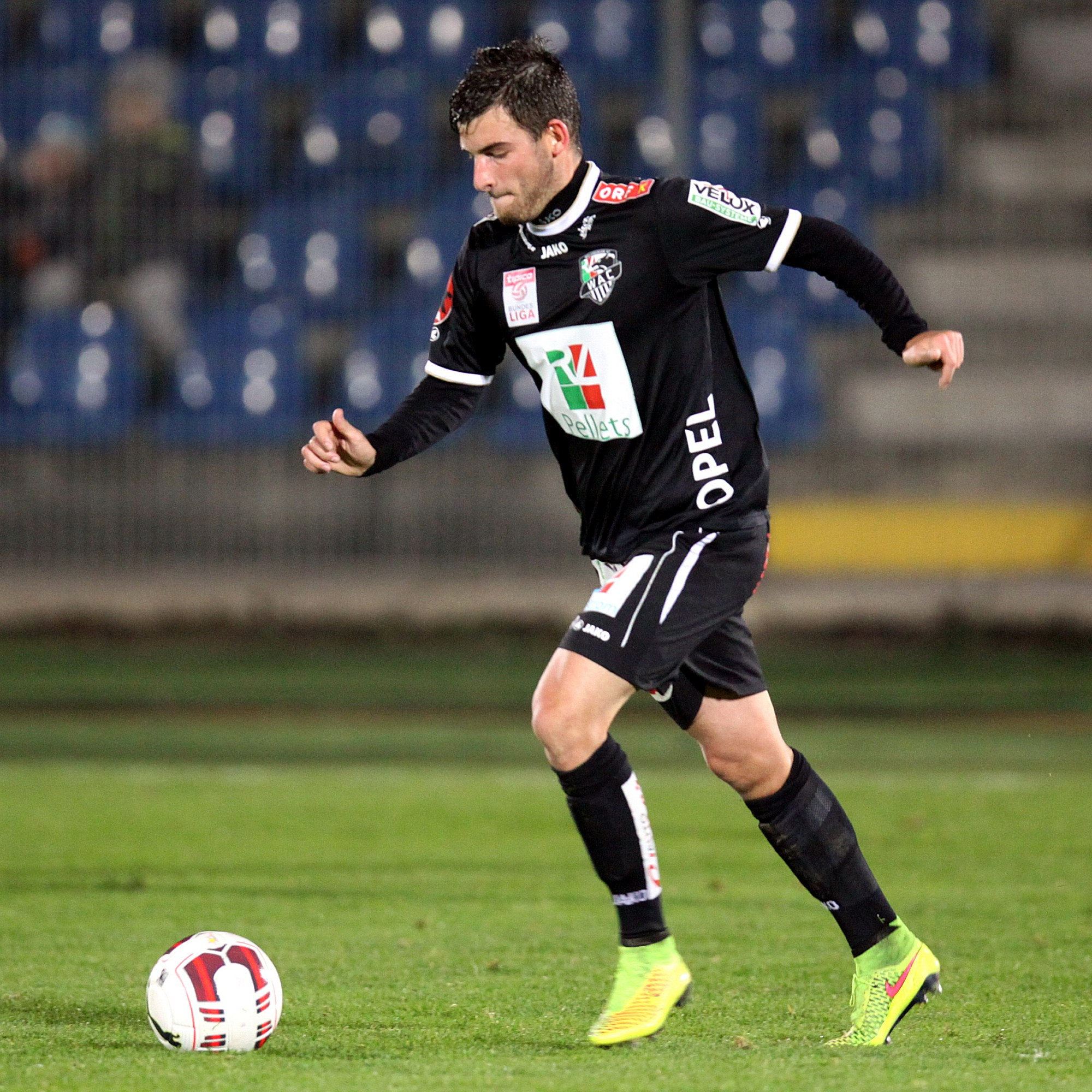

Personal information
- Date of birth: 24 July 1994 (age 32)
- Place of birth: Judenburg, Austria
- Height: 1.76 m (5 ft 9 1/2 in)
- Position: Midfielder

Team information
- Current team: Austria Klagenfurt
- Number: 20

Youth career
- 2000–2006: RW Knittelfeld
- 2006–2008: FC Judenburg
- 2008–2012: Red Bull Salzburg

Senior career*
Years	Team	Apps	(Gls)
2012–2014	FC Liefering	19	(0)
2014–2015	Wolfsberger AC	21	(1)
2015–	Austria Klagenfurt	15	(1)

International career^{‡}
2009	Austria U16	3	(1)
2014–2015	Austria U21	2	(0)
- * Club domestic league appearances and goals as of 31 May 2016 ‡ National team caps and goals as of 31 May 2016

Stefan Schwendinger (born 24 July 1994) is an Austrian footballer who currently plays as a midfielder for Austria Klagenfurt.
