= Oliver Schöpf =

Austrian footballer

Personal information
- Full name: Oliver Schöpf
- Date of birth: 18 July 1990 (age 36)
- Place of birth: Austria
- Height: 1.72 m (5 ft 7 1/2 in)
- Position: Midfielder

Team information
- Current team: FC Gratkorn

Senior career*
Years	Team	Apps	(Gls)
2006–2011	Kapfenberg	4	(0)
2010–2011	→ DSV Leoben (loan)	27	(2)
2011–	FC Gratkorn	0	(0)
- * Club domestic league appearances and goals as of 10:38, 11 August 2009 (UTC)

Oliver Schöpf (born 18 July 1990) is an Austrian professional association football player currently playing for FC Gratkorn. He plays as a midfielder.
