= 2013–14 Austrian Football Bundesliga =

102nd season of top-tier football league in Austria

Austrian Bundesliga
- Season: 2013–14
- Dates: 20 July 2013 – 12 May 2014
- Champions: Red Bull Salzburg
- Relegated: Wacker Innsbruck
- Champions League: Red Bull Salzburg
- Europa League: Rapid Wien; Grödig
- Matches: 180
- Goals: 595 (3.31 per match)
- Top goalscorer: Jonathan Soriano (31)
- Biggest home win: Salzburg 8–1 Wiener Neustadt
- Biggest away win: Grödig 0–6 Sturm Graz
- Highest scoring: Salzburg 8–1 Wiener Neustadt; Salzburg 6–3 Rapid Wien

The 2013–14 Austrian Football Bundesliga was the 102nd season of top-tier football in Austria.

== Licensing procedures ==
On 30 April 2013, the Bundesliga awarded the licenses for the 2013–14 championship. Only 18 out of the 24 clubs that had applied for a license were granted. The Bundesliga teams FC Admira Wacker Mödling and FC Wacker Innsbruck, the First League clubs First Vienna FC and TSV Hartberg, as well as the regional league teams LASK Linz and SV Austria Salzburg were denied the license. First league team SKN St. Pölten received the license through financial conditions. FC Lustenau 07, who had to forcibly withdraw from the First League due to multiple violations of the licensing procedure, did not apply for the license.

All six clubs, which were denied the license in the first place, filed a complaint with the protest committee of the Bundesliga. The protest of the Hartberger team was granted; as well as the protests of FC Admira Wacker Mödling, FC Wacker Innsbruck and First Vienna FC, the latter only under financial conditions. In addition, Vienna was deducted five points for the 2013–14 season for violations of the license terms and conditions.

== Division ==
The Bundesliga, which is sponsored by tipp3 as the main sports sponsor, is the highest division in Austrian football and was played for the 40th time in the 2013–14 season and determined the 102nd Austrian Football Champion. Subsponsor was the mobile provider T-Mobile Austria, which is why the official league designation was tipp3-Bundesliga powered by T-Mobile.

Lower Austria, Salzburg and Vienna each have two clubs, and Carinthia, Upper Austria, Styria and Tyrol each one club. The Burgenland and Vorarlberg are not represented with any team in Austria's highest league. In the pre-season, the SV Mattersburg went down to the First League, and SV Grödig took their place.

The TV provider Sky Germany AG had the rights to show all Bundesliga games in full-length which were broadcast on the Sky sport Austria pay television channel. The channel broadcast all games as conference calls and individually. In addition, the ORF had the rights to broadcast a game of their choice, which was as a single match labeled the "top match of the round" – which usually took place Sundays, when the midweek rounds were on Wednesdays. This was not possible though in the last two rounds where all games had to be broadcast simultaneously. In addition, the ORF was allowed to show a 45-minute summary of the remaining four games of each round.

== Format ==
In the 2013–14 season ten clubs will compete against each other in 36 rounds, as in previous years. Each team plays twice at home and away against each other team.

Due to the bad European Cup results of the Austrian teams in the 2012–2013 season, Austria fell to 16th place in the UEFA five-year ranking at the end of that season. This meant that there was only one place for the UEFA Champions League and three places for the Europa League in the 2013–14 Bundesliga and Cup season. The champions of the Bundesliga was eligible to take part in the UEFA Champions League qualification and would enter the 2nd or 3rd qualifying round, depending on whether the defending champions spot was used; The second and third placed clubs played in the qualification for the UEFA Europa League, where they entered the second round. The Cup winner took part in the 3rd qualifying round of the Europa League. The last place in the highest division has to go down to the second-class First League.

== Stadia and locations ==
Location of teams in the 2013–14 Austrian Football Bundesliga

Team	Location	Venue	Capacity
Admira	Maria Enzersdorf	Trenkwalder Arena	12,000
Austria Vienna	Vienna	Generali Arena	13,100
Grödig	Grödig	Untersberg-Arena	4,638
Rapid Wien	Vienna	Gerhard Hanappi Stadium	18,500
Red Bull Salzburg	Salzburg	Red Bull Arena	30,188
SV Ried	Ried im Innkreis	Keine Sorgen Arena	7,680
Sturm Graz	Graz	UPC-Arena	15,400
Wacker Innsbruck	Innsbruck	Tivoli-Neu	16,008
SC Wiener Neustadt	Wiener Neustadt	Stadion Wiener Neustadt	10,000
Wolfsberger AC	Wolfsberg	Lavanttal-Arena	8,000

== League table ==
Pos	Team	Pld	W	D	L	GF	GA	GD	Pts	Qualification or relegation
1	Red Bull Salzburg (C)	36	25	5	6	110	35	+75	80	Qualification for the Champions League third qualifying round
2	Rapid Wien	36	17	11	8	63	40	+23	62	Qualification for the Europa League play-off round
3	Grödig	36	15	9	12	68	71	−3	54	Qualification for the Europa League second qualifying round
4	Austria Wien	36	14	11	11	58	44	+14	53	
5	Sturm Graz	36	13	9	14	55	55	0	48	
6	Ried	36	10	13	13	55	66	−11	43	
7	Wolfsberger AC	36	11	8	17	50	63	−13	41	
8	Wiener Neustadt	36	10	9	17	43	84	−41	39	
9	Admira Wacker Mödling	36	11	9	16	51	67	−16	37 (Note: Admira were deducted eight points because of violations of licensing regulations and requirements. After an appeal, it was changed to five points.)	
10	Wacker Innsbruck (R)	36	5	14	17	42	70	−28	29	Relegation to Austrian First Football League

Source: weltfussball.de (in German)
Rules for classification: 1) points; 2) goal difference; 3) number of goals scored.
(C) Champions; (R) Relegated

== Results ==
Teams play each other four times in this league. In the first half of the season each team plays every other team twice (home and away) and then do the same in the second half of the season, for a total of 36 games

=== First half of season ===
Home \ Away	ADM	AWI	GRÖ	RWI	RBS	RIE	STU	WKR	WN	WOL
Admira Wacker Mödling		1–0	0–4	2–0	3–1	1–4	1–1	1–2	0–3	3–0
Austria Wien	2–0		2–3	0–1	1–2	3–3	3–2	1–1	5–0	1–0
Grödig	7–1	1–0		2–2	0–3	0–0	0–1	3–3	3–6	4–3
Rapid Wien	4–2	0–0	0–1		2–1	2–0	2–2	3–0	4–0	2–4
Red Bull Salzburg	1–0	5–1	4–1	1–1		4–0	1–0	6–0	8–1	2–2
Ried	2–2	1–1	4–2	2–0	0–5		3–0	4–0	1–1	1–0
Sturm Graz	0–2	1–2	0–2	2–4	1–1	2–0		1–0	2–3	4–1
Wacker Innsbruck	3–3	0–5	5–3	0–4	1–1	2–3	2–2		4–0	1–2
Wiener Neustadt	1–0	0–3	0–2	0–0	1–5	3–3	1–3	1–1		2–1
Wolfsberger AC	3–1	1–4	1–1	2–2	1–2	1–1	2–1	1–1	1–1	

Source: weltfussball.de (in German)
Legend: Blue = home team win; Yellow = draw; Red = away team win.

=== Second half of season ===
Home \ Away	ADM	AWI	GRÖ	RWI	RBS	RIE	STU	WKR	WN	WOL
Admira Wacker Mödling		0–1	4–0	2–1	2–3	2–2	1–1	3–0	3–0	1–0
Austria Wien	2–2		2–0	0–1	3–0	1–1	1–2	2–1	1–1	3–1
Grödig	2–1	2–1		2–2	1–3	3–0	0–6	1–1	1–2	3–0
Rapid Wien	0–0	3–1	0–0		2–1	1–0	2–0	2–0	0–0	3–0
Red Bull Salzburg	6–1	4–0	6–0	6–3		4–0	1–2	0–0	5–0	5–0
Ried	3–0	2–2	1–4	2–5	1–3		2–2	1–2	2–1	1–3
Sturm Graz	1–1	1–1	2–2	2–0	1–4	2–1		3–1	1–2	1–4
Wacker Innsbruck	0–0	1–1	3–3	1–1	0–1	1–1	0–1		3–1	0–1
Wiener Neustadt	5–2	0–2	1–3	0–3	1–5	1–1	2–1	1–0		1–1
Wolfsberger AC	2–3	0–0	1–2	2–1	2–0	0–2	0–1	3–2	4–0	

Source: weltfussball.de (in German)
Legend: Blue = home team win; Yellow = draw; Red = away team win.

== Top goalscorers ==
As of 12 May 2014

Rank	Player	Team	Goals
1	(Spain) Jonathan Soriano	Red Bull Salzburg	31
2	(Brazil) Alan	Red Bull Salzburg	26
3	(United States) Terrence Boyd	Rapid Wien	15
3	(Austria) René Gartler	Ried	15
3	(Austria) Philipp Zulechner	Grödig	15
6	(Austria) Philipp Hosiner	Austria Wien	14
7	(Austria) Lukas Hinterseer	Wacker Innsbruck	13
7	(Senegal) Sadio Mané	Red Bull Salzburg	13
9	(Austria) Guido Burgstaller	Rapid Wien	11
9	(Austria) Michael Liendl	Wolfsberger AC	11
9	(Austria) René Schicker	Admira Wacker	11

== Attendances ==
#	Club	Average
1	Rapid	13,792
2	Salzburg	10,106
3	Austria	8,247
4	Sturm	7,530
5	Wacker	5,895
6	WAC	4,582
7	Ried	4,374
8	Admira	2,938
9	Wiener Neustadt	2,264
10	Grödig	1,958
