= 2014–15 FC Admira Wacker Mödling season =

Austrian football club season

FC Admira Wacker Mödling are an Austrian football club which are based in Mödling. During the 2014/15 campaign they will be competing in the Austrian Bundesliga and Austrian Cup.

== Austrian Bundesliga ==
19 July 2014 Match 1	Admira	1 - 4	Wolfsberger AC	Maria Enzersdorf
19:00	Thürauer (yellow card) 12'; Schicker 45+2' (pen.); Knasmüllner (yellow card) 72'	Summary	Žulj 35'; Trdina 63'; Wernitznig 74' 77'	Stadium: Bundesstadion Südstadt; Attendance: 2,139; Referee: (Austria) Manuel Schüttengruber

2 August 2014 Match 3	Admira	1 - 1	Rapid Wien	Maria Enzersdorf
16:30	Schick 7' (yellow card) 60'; Windbichler (yellow card) 12' (yellow-red card); Zwierschitz (yellow card) 52'	Summary	Dibon (yellow card) 43'; Schaub (yellow card) 57'; Kainz 63'; Schrammel (yellow card) 67'	Stadium: Bundesstadion Südstadt; Attendance: 6,125; Referee: (Austria) Rene Eisner

9 August 2014 Match 4	SV Ried	1 - 1	Admira	Ried im Innkreis
19:00	Pichler 45+2' (yellow card) 80'; Streker (yellow card) 85'; Kragl (yellow card) 85'; Walch (yellow card) 87'	Summary	Schößwendter (yellow card) 11'; Ebner (yellow card) 16'; Auer 56'; Schick (yellow card) 68'; Katzer (yellow card) 77'	Stadium: Keine Sorgen Arena; Attendance: 3,500; Referee: (Austria) Harald Lechner

13 August 2014 Match 2	SC Rheindorf Altach	0 - 2	Admira	Altach
19:30	Daniel Luxbacher (yellow card) 26'; Aigner (yellow card) 53'	Summary	Markus Lackner (yellow card) 28'; Zwierschitz 37'; Schicker 72'	Stadium: Stadion Schnabelholz; Attendance: 4,376; Referee: (Austria) Alexander Harkam

16 August 2014 Match 5	Admira	0 - 3	Red Bull Salzburg	Maria Enzersdorf
19:00	Toth (yellow card) 28'; Ebner (yellow card) 52'; Ouédraogo (yellow card) 52'; Zwierschitz (yellow card) 63'	Summary	Bruno 24'; Schwegler 50'; Hinteregger (yellow card) 66'; Sabitzer 74'	Stadium: Bundesstadion Südstadt; Attendance: 3,500; Referee: (Austria) Dominik Ouschan

23 August 2014 Match 6	SC Wiener Neustadt	5 - 4	Admira	Wiener Neustadt
19:00	O'Brien 26'; Dobras (yellow card) 27' (goal) 47'; Pollhammer (yellow card) 36'; Freitag (yellow card) 42'; Rauter 75'; Mario Ebenhofer 79'; Al Rahman Ali 86'; Christian Deutschmann (yellow card) 90+2'	Summary	Bajrami (yellow card) 23' (goal) 38' 66'; Schicker 56'; Toth (yellow card) 59'; Ouédraogo 90+1'	Stadium: Stadion Wiener Neustadt; Attendance: 1,390; Referee: (Austria) Manuel Schüttengruber

30 August 2014 Match 7	Admira	2 - 1	Austria Wien	Maria Enzersdorf
19:00	Wessely (yellow card) 7'; Bajrami 43'; Zwierschitz 45+2'; Ouédraogo (yellow card) 49'; Markus Lackner (yellow card) 79'; Katzer (yellow card) 88'; Schößwendter (yellow card) 90+5'	Summary	Grünwald 51'; Suttner (yellow card) 64'	Stadium: Bundesstadion Südstadt; Attendance: 4,007; Referee: (Austria) Christian Dintar

13 September 2014 Match 8	Sturm Graz	0 - 2	Admira	Graz
18:30	Madl (yellow card) 11'	Summary	Markus Lackner (yellow card) 37'; Zwierschitz 40'; Thürauer 60'; Bajrami (yellow card) 79'; Katzer (yellow card) 81'; Sulimani (yellow card) 90+3'	Stadium: UPC-Arena; Attendance: 6,893; Referee: (Austria) Robert Schörgenhofer

20 September 2014 Match 9	Admira	0 - 0	SV Grödig	Maria Enzersdorf
18:30	Wessely (yellow card) 35' (yellow-red card); Zwierschitz (yellow card) 57'; Bajrami (yellow card) 89'	Summary	Karner (yellow card) 14'; Martschinko (yellow card) 31'; Reyna (yellow card) 38'; Maak (yellow card) 46'; Sandro Djuric (yellow card) 80'; Brauer (yellow card) 90+4'	Stadium: Bundesstadion Südstadt; Attendance: 2,200; Referee: (Austria) Andreas Kollegger

27 September 2014 Match 10	Wolfsberger AC	2 - 1	Admira	Wolfsberg
18:30	Žulj 3' (yellow card) 66'; Jacobo (yellow card) 60'; Seebacher (yellow card) 69'; Standfest 89'	Summary	Ouédraogo (yellow card) 19'; Sulimani 51'; Auer (yellow card) 59'; Bajrami (yellow card) 81'	Stadium: Lavanttal-Arena; Attendance: 4,500; Referee: (Austria) Alexander Harkam

4 October 2014 Match 11	Admira	0 - 2	SC Rheindorf Altach	Maria Enzersdorf
18:30	Katzer (yellow card) 14'; Thürauer (yellow card) 71'	Summary	Jan Zwischenbrugger (yellow card) 9'; Andreas Lienhart 19'; Seeger 62'; César Ortiz (yellow card) 68'; Darijo Pecirep (yellow card) 70'	Stadium: Bundesstadion Südstadt; Attendance: 2,319; Referee: (Austria) Harald Lechner

18 October 2014 Match 12	Rapid Wien	0 - 0	Admira	Vienna
18:30	Kainz (yellow card) 74'; Petsos (yellow card) 90'	Summary	Ebner (yellow card) 27'; Katzer (yellow card) 33'; Bajrami (yellow card) 46'; Schicker (yellow card) 76'	Stadium: Ernst-Happel-Stadion; Attendance: 15,200; Referee: (Austria) Dominik Ouschan

25 October 2014 Match 13	Admira	0 - 0	SV Ried	Maria Enzersdorf
18:30	Ouédraogo (yellow card) 35'; Markus Lackner (yellow card) 41'; Schicker (yellow card) 62'; Windbichler (yellow card) 88' (yellow-red card); Schößwendter (yellow card) 90+2'	Summary	Pichler (yellow card) 37'; Streker (yellow card) 39'; Ziegl (yellow card) 66'; Perstaller (yellow card) 86'	Stadium: Bundesstadion Südstadt; Attendance: 2,070; Referee: (Austria) Alexander Harkam

1 November 2014 Match 14	Red Bull Salzburg	2 - 0	Admira	Wals-Siezenheim
18:30	Soriano 3' 40'; Ankersen (yellow card) 51'; Hinteregger (yellow card) 89'	Summary	Schößwendter (yellow card) 65'; Wessely (red card) 65'; Thürauer (yellow card) 90'	Stadium: Red Bull Arena; Attendance: 7,412; Referee: (Austria) Rene Eisner

8 November 2014 Match 15	Admira	1 - 1	SC Wiener Neustadt	Maria Enzersdorf
18:30	Thürauer 21'; Sulimani (yellow card) 32'; Ouédraogo (yellow card) 34'	Summary	Rauter (yellow card) 25'; Mario Ebenhofer (yellow card) 44'; Dobras 61'; Mally (yellow card) 72'	Stadium: Bundesstadion Südstadt; Attendance: 2,355; Referee: (Austria) Robert Schörgenhofer

22 November 2014 Match 16	Austria Wien	4 - 0	Admira	Vienna
18:30 CET	Leitgeb (yellow card) 45'; Damari 61' (pen.); Šikov (yellow card) 63'; Royer 68'; Gorgon 71' 82'	Summary	Markus Lackner (yellow card) 20'; Windbichler (red card) 60'	Stadium: Franz Horr Stadium; Attendance: 7,064; Referee: (Austria) Andreas Kollegger

29 November 2014 Match 17	Admira	0 - 2	Sturm Graz	Maria Enzersdorf
18:30 CET	Schicker (red card) 14'	Summary	Djuricin 25'; Piesinger 37'; Spendlhofer (yellow card) 52'; Stanković (yellow card) 56'	Stadium: Bundesstadion Südstadt; Attendance: 2,519; Referee: (Austria) Dieter Muckenhammer

6 December 2014 Match 18	SV Grödig	5 - 0	Admira	Grödig
18:30 CET				Stadium: Untersberg-Arena

13 December 2014 Match 19	Admira	2-1	Wolfsberger AC	Maria Enzersdorf
				Stadium: Bundesstadion Südstadt

14 February 2015 Match 20	SC Rheindorf Altach	2-0	Admira	Altach
18:30 CET	Ngwat-Mahop 9'; Philipp Netzer (yellow card) 62'; César Ortiz (yellow card) 69'; Ivan Kovacec 76'	Summary	Ebner (yellow card) 82'	Stadium: Stadion Schnabelholz; Attendance: 3,350; Referee: (Austria) Alexander Harkam

22 February 2015 Match 21	Admira	1-1	Rapid Wien	Maria Enzersdorf
16:30 CET	Webber 74'; Schößwendter (yellow card) 81'; Zwierschitz (yellow card) 89'	Summary	Berić 34' (yellow card) 37'; Ferdinand Weinwurm (yellow card) 41'; Petsos (yellow card) 70'	Stadium: Bundesstadion Südstadt; Attendance: 4,966; Referee: (Austria) René Eisner

28 February 2015 Match 22	SV Ried	2-2	Admira	Ried im Innkreis
18:30 CET	Thomalla 80'; Janeczek (yellow card) 86'; Filipović 90+4'	Summary	Schicker (yellow card) 20'; Ebner (yellow card) 35'; Markus Lackner (yellow card) 58'; Zwierschitz 67' (yellow card) 68'; Sulimani 84'	Stadium: Keine Sorgen Arena; Attendance: 3,000; Referee: (Austria) Andreas Kollegger

4 March 2015 Match 23	Admira	1-4	Red Bull Salzburg	Maria Enzersdorf
19:00 CET	Markus Lackner (yellow card) 28'; Schicker 89'	Summary	Sabitzer 11' (red card) 22'; Minamino 38' 69'; Laimer (yellow card) 45+1'; Lazaro (yellow card) 48'; Gulácsi (yellow card) 50'; Ćaleta-Car (yellow card) 52'; André Ramalho Silva (yellow card) 72'; Berisha 90+1'	Stadium: Bundesstadion Südstadt; Attendance: 2,350; Referee: (Austria) Manuel Schuettengruber

7 March 2015 Match 24	SC Wiener Neustadt	0-0	Admira	Wiener Neustadt
18:30 CET	Sereinig (yellow card) 32'	Summary	Windbichler (yellow card) 66'	Stadium: Stadion Wiener Neustadt; Attendance: 2,860; Referee: (Austria) Robert Schoergenhofer

14 March 2015 Match 25	Admira	1-1	Austria Wien	Maria Enzersdorf
16:00 CET	Ebner (yellow card) 44'; Katzer (yellow card) 66' (goal) 85'	Summary	Leitgeb (yellow card) 55'; Suttner 82'; Horvath (yellow card) 88'; Rotpuller (yellow card) 90+1'	Stadium: Bundesstadion Südstadt; Attendance: 3,970; Referee: (Austria) Dieter Muckenhammer

21 March 2015 Match 26	Sturm Graz	3-1	Admira	Graz
18:30 CET	Avdijaj 28'; Piesinger (yellow card) 52' (goal) 69'; Stanković 85'	Summary	Ebner (yellow card) 63'; Ouédraogo (yellow card) 67'; Schicker 74'; Katzer (yellow card) 84'	Stadium: UPC-Arena; Attendance: 10,200; Referee: (Austria) Christian Dintar

4 April 2015 Match 27	Admira	2-3	SV Grödig	Maria Enzersdorf
18:30 CET	Windbichler 5' (pen.); Konstantin Kerschbaumer 24'; Bajrami (yellow card) 58'	Summary	Maak (red card) 4'; Karner 26'; Nutz 34' (pen.); Bernd Gschweidl (yellow card) 54'; Hart 75'	Stadium: Bundesstadion Südstadt; Attendance: 2,376; Referee: (Austria) René Eisner

11 April 2015 Match 28	Wolfsberger AC	2-0	Admira	Wolfsberg, Carinthia
18:30 CET	Drescher 43' (yellow card) 87'; Wernitznig (yellow card) 51'; Jacobo (yellow card) 66'; Seidl 70'	Summary	Katzer (yellow card) 63'	Stadium: Lavanttal-Arena; Attendance: 3,500; Referee: (Austria) Christopher Jäger

18 April 2015 Match 29	Admira	2-2	SC Rheindorf Altach	Maria Enzersdorf
18:30	Konstantin Kerschbaumer (yellow card) 25'; Windbichler 58' (pen.); Grozurek (yellow card) 61'; Ouédraogo 79'	Summary	Aigner (yellow card) 31' (yellow-red card) (goal) 45+1' 62'; Ngwat-Mahop (yellow card) 69'; Seeger (yellow card) 89'	Stadium: Bundesstadion Südstadt; Attendance: 1,500; Referee: (Austria) Harald Lechner

25 April 2015 Match 30	Rapid Wien	1-1	Admira	Vienna
18:30 CET	Schobesberger 70' (yellow card) 73'	Summary	Ouédraogo (yellow card) 44'; Schößwendter (yellow card) 50'; Philipp Malicsek (yellow card) 53'; Sulimani 80'	Stadium: Ernst-Happel-Stadion; Attendance: 13,800; Referee: (Austria) Robert Schoergenhofer

2 May 2015 Match 31	Admira	1-0	SV Ried	Maria Enzersdorf
18:30 CET	Sulimani 28'; Ebner (yellow card) 43'; Konstantin Kerschbaumer (yellow card) 89'; Katzer (yellow card) 90+2'	Summary	Filipović (yellow card) 44'; Trauner (yellow card) 68'; Lainer (yellow card) 71'	Stadium: Bundesstadion Südstadt; Attendance: 2,487; Referee: (Austria) Andreas Heiß

9 May 2015 Match 32	Red Bull Salzburg	4-0	Admira	Wals-Siezenheim
18:30 CET	Soriano 12'; Ulmer 33'; Schmitz (yellow card) 47'; Sabitzer 67' 68'	Summary	Windbichler (yellow card) 61'	Stadium: Red Bull Arena; Attendance: 8,459; Referee: (Switzerland) Stephan Klossner

16 May 2015 Match 33	Admira	0-0	SC Wiener Neustadt	Maria Enzersdorf
18:30 CET	Ouédraogo (yellow card) 25'; Windbichler (yellow card) 48'; Schößwendter (yellow card) 55'; Katzer (yellow card) 82'	Summary	Kainz (yellow card) 67'; Hofbauer (yellow card) 74'	Stadium: Bundesstadion Südstadt; Attendance: 8,250; Referee: (Austria) Dieter Muckenhammer

20 May 2015 Match 34	Austria Wien	0-1	Admira	Vienna
20:30 CET	Ramsebner (yellow card) 74'	Summary	Bajrami (yellow card) 56'; Schößwendter 83'; Siebenhandl (yellow card) 90'	Stadium: Franz Horr Stadium; Attendance: 5,807; Referee: (Austria) Alexander Harkam

24 May 2015 Match 35	Admira	1-2	Sturm Graz	Maria Enzersdorf
17:45 CET	Windbichler 16' (pen.) (yellow card) 27'; Auer (yellow card) 75'	Summary	Piesinger (yellow card) 40'; Avdijaj 52'; Ehrenreich (yellow card) 53'; Hadžić 70' (yellow card) 90'; Offenbacher (yellow card) 90'	Stadium: Bundesstadion Südstadt; Attendance: 2,700; Referee: (Austria) Harald Lechner

31 May 2015 Match 36	SV Grödig	0-1	Admira	Grödig
16:30 CET	Fabio Strauss (yellow card) 12'; Stankovic (yellow card) 70'	Summary	Vastić 77' (yellow card) 81'	Stadium: Untersberg-Arena; Attendance: 1,600; Referee: (Austria) Alexander Harkam

== Austrian Cup ==
11 July 2014 Round 1	Lendorf	0 - 7	Admira	Lendorf
19:30	Martin Nagy (yellow card) 44'	Summary	Thürauer 35'; Bajrami 52'; Ebner 59'; Ouédraogo 63'; Auer 73'; Mario Nagy 74' (o.g.); Schick 80'	Stadium: Thomas-Morgenstern-Arena; Attendance: 700; Referee: (Austria) Bernd Eigler

24 September 2014 Round 2	SC Wiener Neustadt	2 - 2 (a.e.t.) (5 - 3 p)	Admira	Wiener Neustadt
19:00	Koch 27'; Christian Deutschmann 68'	Summary	Ouédraogo 34'; Katzer 82' (yellow card) 95'	Stadium: Stadion Wiener Neustadt; Attendance: 1,367; Referee: (Austria) Markus Hameter
