= 2013–14 FK Austria Wien season =

Austria Wien
2013–14 season
- Chairman: Wolfgang Katzian
- Manager: Nenad Bjelica (To 16 February); Herbert Gager (From 16 February)
- Stadium: Generali Arena, Vienna, Austria
- Bundesliga: 4th
- Austrian Cup: Second round
- Champions League: Group stage
- Top goalscorer: League: Philipp Hosiner (14); All: Philipp Hosiner (17)

The 2013–14 FK Austria Wien season was the 102nd season in club history. Austria Wien participated in the Bundesliga, the Austrian Cup, and the UEFA Champions League, where they began in the third qualifying round and reached the group stage.

== Background ==
=== Background information ===
Austria Wien won the 2012–13 Bundesliga. As champions, Austria Wien entered the third qualifying round of the UEFA Champions League. Austria Wien also participated in the Bundesliga and the Austrian Cup. Peter Stöger left Austria Wien to become head coach of German 2. Bundesliga club 1. FC Köln on 11 June. Nenad Bjelica succeeded Stöger on 17 June. The players reported for pre–season on 18 June.

=== Transfers ===
==== In ====
Date	Pos.	Name	Age	EU	Moving from	Type	Contract ends	Transfer fee	Sources
18 June 2013	FW	Rubin Okotie	26	Yes	Sturm Graz	Transfer	Undisclosed	Undisclosed	
24 June 2013	MF	Daniel Royer	23	Yes	Hannover 96	Transfer	2015	Undisclosed	
6 January 2014	MF	David de Paula	29	Yes	Wolfsberger AC	Transfer	2015	Undisclosed	
28 January 2014	FW	Ola Kamara	24	No	SV Ried	Transfer	2015	Undisclosed	
31 January 2014	MF	Thomas Salamon	25	Yes	SV Grödig	Transfer	2017	Undisclosed	

==== Out ====
Date	Pos.	Name	Age	EU	Moving to	Type	Transfer fee	Sources
30 January 2014	MF	Tomáš Šimkovič	26	Yes	Tobol	Transfer	Undisclosed	
31 January 2014	FW	Rubin Okotie	26	YES	SønderjyskE	transfer	Undisclosed	
31 January 2014	MF	Dare Vršič	29	Yes	Maribor	Transfer	Undisclosed	
31 January 2014	DF	Marin Leovac	25	Yes	Rijeka	Transfer	€250,000	

== Bundesliga ==
=== Bundesliga review ===
==== Matchdays 1 – 9 ====
Austria Wien began their Bundesliga campaign on 20 July against Admira Wacker Mödling. Austria Wien won 2–0 with goals from Philipp Hosiner and Marko Stanković. Austria Wien finished the first matchday in second place. Austria Wien faced Red Bull Salzburg in the Bundesliga on matchday two on 27 July. Red Bull Salzburg won 5–1. Alexander Grünwald scored for Austria Wien. Jonathan Soriano, Alan, Kevin Kampl and André Ramalho Silva scored for Red Bull Salzburg. Kevin Kampl scored two of the goals. Austria Wien finished July in sixth place in the table. Austria Wien started August with matchday three of the Bundesliga against SV Ried on 3 August. The match ended in a 3–3 draw. Marko Stanković (two goals) and Tomáš Jun scored for Austria Wien. René Gartler, Oliver Kragl and Furkan Aydogdu scored for Ried. Austria Wien remained in sixth place in the table. Austria Wien faced Rapid Wien on matchday four on 11 August. This was the 306th Vienna derby. The match ended in a 0–0 draw. Austria Wien finished the matchday in sixth place. Austria Wien faced Wiener Neustadt on matchday five on 17 August. Austria Wien won 5–0 with goals from Alexander Gorgon, Tomáš Jun, Philipp Hosiner and Marko Stanković. Hosiner scored two goals. Austria Wien finished the matchday in fifth place. Austria Wien faced Wolfsberger AC on matchday six on 25 August. Austria Wien won 4–1. Daniel Royer, Alexander Grünwald, Marko Stanković and Roman Kienast scored for Austria Wien. Dario Baldauf scored for Wolfsberg. Austria Wien finished the matchday in fourth place.

Austria Wien finished August with matchday seven of the Bundesliga on 31 August against Wacker Innsbruck. The match ended as a 1–1 draw. Austria Wien had not scored against Wacker in 656 minutes. Rubin Okotie scored for Austria Wien and Lukas Hinterseer scored for Wacker Innsbruck. Austria Wien Finished August in fourth place. Austria Wien started September with matchday 8 of the Bundesliga against Grödig 14 September. Austria Wien lost 3–2. Austria Wien got goals from Marko Stanković and Daniel Royer. Grödig's goalscorers were Mario Leitgeb and Philipp Huspek. Mario Leitgeb scored two goals. Austria Wien finished the matchday in fifth place. The following day, Alexander Grünwald suffered an Anterior cruciate ligament injury during training.

Austria Wien faced Sturm Graz on matchday nine on 21 September. Austria Wien won 2–1. Philipp Hosiner and Marko Stanković scored for Austria Wien and Daniel Beichler scored for Sturm Graz. Austria Wien finished the matchday in fourth place. An MRI on 23 September showed that Stanković had a torn muscle in the calf and would "miss several weeks".

==== Matchdays 10–18 ====
Austria Wien finished September with matchday 10 against Admira Wacker Mödling on 28 September. Admira won 1–0 with a goal from René Schicker. Austria Wien finished the matchday fifth in the table. Austria Wien faced Red Bull Salzburg on matchday 11 on 6 October. Red Bull Salzburg won 2–1. Daniel Royer scored for Austria Wien. Sadio Mané and Alan scored for Red Bull Salzburg. Austria Wien remained in fifth place. Austria Wien faced SV Ried on matchday 12 on 19 October. The match ended in a 1–1 draw. Philipp Hosiner scored for Austria Wien and Julius Perstaller scored for Ried. Austria Wien finished the matchday in fifth place. Austria Wien finished October with matchday 13 against Rapid Wien on 27 October. This was the 307th Vienna derby. Rapid Wien won 1–0 with a goal from Terrence Boyd. The loss ended a 10–match undefeated streak ended against Rapid Wien. Austria Wien finished October in fifth place.

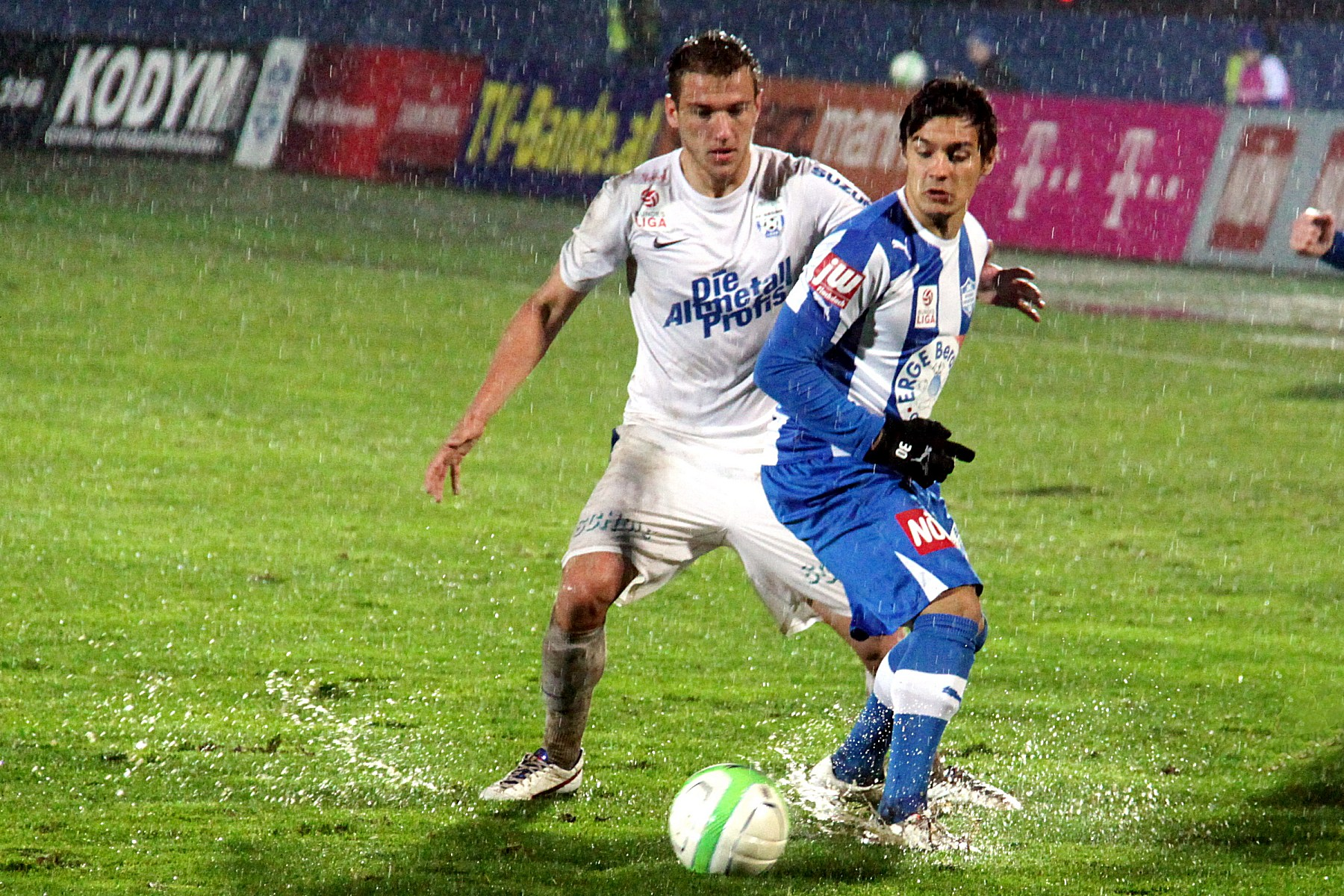
Leitgeb (in white shirt) during the match between SC Wiener Neustadt, 23 November 2013

Austria Wien started November with matchday 14 against Wiener Neustadt on 3 November. Austria Wien won 3–0 with three goals from Roman Kienast. Austria Wien finished the matchday in fifth place. Austria Wien faced Wolfsberg on matchday 15 on 9 November. Austria Wien won 1–0 with a goal from Thomas Murg. Austria Wien finished the matchday in fourth place. Austria Wien faced Wacker Innsbruck on matchday 16 on 23 November. Austria Wien won 5–0 with goals from Philipp Hosiner, Thomas Murg, and Markus Suttner. Philipp Hosiner scored three goals. Austria Wien finished the matchday in third place. Austria Wien finished November with matchday 17 against Grödig. Grödig won 1–0 with a goal from Stefan Nutz. Austria Wien finished November in fourth place. Austria Wien started December with matchday 18 against Sturm Graz on 3 December. Austria Wien won 3–2. Christian Ramsebner, Daniel Royer, and Philipp Hosiner scored for Austria Wien. Daniel Beichler and Manuel Weber scored for Sturm Graz. Austria Wien finished the matchday in third place.

==== Matchdays 19–27 ====
Austria Wien faced Admira Wacker Mödling on matchday 19 on 7 December. The match ended in a 2–2 draw. Roman Kienast and Christian Ramsebner scored for Austria Wien. René Schicker scored two goals for Admira. Austria Wien finished the matchday in fourth place. Austria Wien faced Red Bull Salzburg on matchday 20 on 17 December. Red Bull Salzburg won 4–0 with goals from André Ramalho, Valon Berisha, Alan, and Sadio Mané. This was Austria Wien's third loss of the season against Red Bull Salzburg after losing 5–1 and 2–1 earlier in the season. Austria Wien finished the matchday in fourth place. Austria Wien finished December with matchday 21 against SV Ried on 18 December. The match ended in a 1–1 draw. Kaja Rogulj scored for Austria Wien and René Gartler scored for Ried. Austria Wien finished December in fourth place. Austria Wien returned to training on 7 January. David de Paula, Ola Kamara, and Thomas Salamon join Austria Wien during mid–season training. Rubin Okotie left on loan during mid–winter training. Tomáš Šimkovič, Marin Leovac and Dare Vršič were sold during mid-winter training. Austria Wien faced Rapid Wien on matchday 22 on 9 February, the 308th Vienna derby. Rapid Wien won 3–1. David de Paula scored for Austria Wien. Rapid Wien's goals came from an own goal from Kaja Rogulj along with goals from Marcel Sabitzer and Mario Sonnleitner. This is Austria Wien's first lost at Gerhard Hanappi Stadium since 14 March 2010. Austria Wien finished the matchday in fifth place.

Austria Wien faced Wiener Neustadt on Matchday 23 on 15 February. The match ended in a 1–1 draw. Thomas Salamon scored for Austria Wien and Stefan Rakowitz scored for Wiener Neustadt. Austria Wien finished the match in fifth place. The following day, Nenad Bjelica was sacked as head coach along with assistant coach René Poms. Herbert Gager took over until the end of the season. He was head coach of the reserve team until that time. Andreas Ogris took over as reserve team coach until the end of the season until the end of the season. Austria Wien faced Wolfsberger AC on matchday 24 on 22 February. The match ended in a 0–0 draw. Austria Wien finished the matchday in fifth place. Austria Wien faced Wacker Innsbruck on matchday 25 on 1 March. Austria Wien won 2–1. Tomáš Jun (2 goals) scored for Austria Wien and Júnior Felício Marques scored for Wacker Innsbruck. Austria Wien finished the matchday in third place. Austria Wien faced SV Grödig on matchday 26 on 8 March. Austria Wien won 2–0 with goals from Philipp Hosiner and Alexander Gorgon.

=== Fixtures and results ===
Win Draw Loss Postponed

MD	Date – KO CET/CEST	Venue	Opponent	Res. F–A	Att.	Goalscorers		Table			Ref.
MD	Date – KO CET/CEST	Venue	Opponent	Res. F–A	Att.	Austria Wien	Opponent	Pos.	Pts.	GD	Ref.
1	20 July – 16:30	H	Admira	2–0	8,016	Hosiner 78'; Stanković 90' (pen.)	—	2	3	+2	
2	27 July – 19:00	A	Red Bull Salzburg	1–5	12,293	A. Grünwald 40'	Soriano 9'; Alan 27'; Kampl 46', 73'; Ramalho 64'	6	3	–2	
3	3 August – 19:00	H	Ried	3–3	8,408	Stanković 22', 45'; Jun 61'	Gartler 60'; Kragl 81'; Aydogdu 89'	6	4	–2	
4	11 August – 16:30	A	Rapid Wien	0–0	16,118	—	—	6	5	–2	
5	17 August – 19:00	H	Wiener Neustadt	5–0	8,185	Gorgon 7'; Jun 28'; Hosiner 70', 90'; Stanković 75'	—	5	8	+3	
6	25 August – 16:30	A	Wolfsberg	4–1	5,237	Royer 28'; A. Grünwald 59'; Stanković 82'; Kienast 85'	Baldauf 68'	4	11	+6	
7	31 August – 19:00	H	Wacker Innsbruck	1–1	8,922	Okotie 56'	Hinterseer 56'	4	12	+6	
8	14 September – 19:00	H	Grödig	2–3	6,951	Stanković 28' (pen.); Royer 66'	Leitgeb 47', 81'; Huspek 66'	5	12	+5	
9	21 September – 16:30	A	Sturm Graz	2–1	12,286	Hosiner 28'; Šimkovič 52' (pen.)	Beichler 6'	4	15	+6	
10	28 September – 19:00	A	Admira	0–1	4,676	—	Schicker 83'	5	15	+5	
11	6 October – 16:30	H	Red Bull Salzburg	1–2	8,803	Royer 24'	Mané 8'; Alan 48'	5	15	+4	
12	19 October – 19:00	A	Ried	1–1	4,867	Hosiner 16'	Perstaller 19'	5	16	+5	
13	27 October – 16:30	H	Rapid Wien	0–1	9,894	—	Boyd 88'	5	16	+3	
14	3 November – 16:30	A	Wiener Neustadt	3–0	2,720	Kienast 8', 38', 50'	—	5	19	+6	
15	9 November – 19:00	H	Wolfsberg	1–0	7,381	Murg 53'	—	4	22	+7	
16	23 November – 19:00	A	Wacker Innsbruck	5–0	5,221	Hosiner 20', 40', 73'; Murg 27'; Suttner 55'	—	3	25	+12	
17	30 November – 16:30	A	Grödig	0–1	1,496	—	Nutz 63'	4	25	+11	
18	3 December – 20:30	H	Sturm Graz	3–2	6,698	Ramsebner 15'; Royer 44'; Hosiner 70'	Beichler 26'; Weber 90'	3	28	+12	
19	7 December – 19:00	H	Admira	2–2	7,231	Kienast 12'; Ramsebner 34'	Schicker 42', 75'	4	29	+12	
20	15 December – 16:30	A	Red Bull Salzburg	0–4	9,324	—	Ramalho 23'; Berisha 38'; Carvalho 66'; Mané 87'	4	29	+8	
21	17 December – 20:30	H	Ried	1–1	6,260	Rogulj 85'	Gartler 49'	4	30	+8	
22	9 February – 16:30	A	Rapid Wien	1–3	17,765	de Paula 26'	Rogulj 36' (o.g.); Sabitzer 79'; Sonnleitner 84'	5	30	+6	
23	15 February – 19:00	H	Wiener Neustadt	1–1	7,371	Salamon 10'	Rakowitz 90'	5	31	+6	
24	22 February – 19:00	A	Wolfsberg	0–0		—	—	5	32	+6	
25	1 March – 16:30	H	Wacker Innsbruck	2–1		Jun 21', 76'	Marques 34'	3	35	+7	
26	8 March – 19:00	H	Grödig	2–0		Hosiner 21'; Gorgon 75'	—	3	38	+9	
27	15 March – 16:30	A	Sturm Graz	1–1	7,254	Ramsebner 66'	Djuricin 87' (pen.)	3	39	+9	
28		A	Admira	1–0	5,560		—	4	42	+10	
29		H	Red Bull Salzburg	3–0	10,738		—	3	45	+13	
30	30 March – 16:30	A	Ried	2–2	5,200			3	46	+13	
31		H	Rapid Wien								
32		A	Wiener Neustadt								
33		H	Wolfsberg	3–1	8,752	Hosiner 52', 72', 81'	Seebacher 14'	3	52	+16	
34	26 April – 19:00	A	Wacker Innsbruck	1–1	5,812			3	53	+16	
35	4 May – 16:30	A	Grödig								
36	11 May – 16:30	H	Sturm Graz	1–2	10,072	Jun 86'	Berić 75'; Beichler 87'	4	53	+14	

=== League table ===
Pos	Team	Pld	W	D	L	GF	GA	GD	Pts	Qualification or relegation
2	Rapid Wien	36	17	11	8	63	40	+23	62	Qualification for the Europa League play-off round
3	Grödig	36	15	9	12	68	71	−3	54	Qualification for the Europa League second qualifying round
4	Austria Wien	36	14	11	11	58	44	+14	53	
5	Sturm Graz	36	13	9	14	55	55	0	48	
6	Ried	36	10	13	13	55	66	−11	43	

Source: weltfussball.de (in German)
Rules for classification: 1) points; 2) goal difference; 3) number of goals scored.

=== Results summary ===
Overall								Home						Away					
Pld	W	D	L	GF	GA	GD	Pts	W	D	L	GF	GA	GD	W	D	L	GF	GA	GD
36	14	11	11	58	44	+14	53	8	5	5	33	21	+12	6	6	6	25	23	+2

Last updated: 14 May 2014.

== Austrian Cup ==
=== Austrian Cup review ===
Austrian Cup The draw for the first round of the Austrian Cup and Austria Wien were drawn against SV Oberwart. The match against Oberwart was played on 12 July. Austria Wien won 3–0 with goals from Philipp Hosiner, Alexander Grünwald, and Marko Stanković. Heinz Lindner had "more or less nothing to do." The draw for the second round of the Austrian Cup happened on 7 August and Austria Wien were drawn against Kalsdorf. The match against Karlsdorf happened on 24 September. Austria Wien went into the match with seven players unavailable due to injury. Kalsdorf knocked out Austria Wien with a score of 2–1. Tomáš Jun scored for Austria Wien. Lukas Stadler and Rafael Dorn scored for Karlsdorf.

=== Austrian Cup results ===
Win Draw Loss Postponed

Rd	Date^{1}	Stadium	Opponent	Result^{2}	Attendance	Goalscorers		Ref.
Rd	Date^{1}	Stadium	Opponent	Result^{2}	Attendance	Austria Wien	Opponent	Ref.
FR	12 July – 19:30	A	SV Oberwart	3–0	3,000	Hosiner 20'; Grünwald 27'; Stanković 72'	—	
SR	24 September – 19:00	A	SC Kalsdorf	1–2	2,000	Jun 51'	Stadler 9'; Dorn 90+3'	

== Champions League ==
=== Champions League review ===
Austria Wien won the 2012–13 Bundesliga. As champions, Austria Wien entered the third qualifying round of Champions League. Austria Wien was involved in the Champions League draw for the third qualifying round. Austria Wien was drawn against the winner of FH and FK Ekranas from the second qualifying round. FH ended up advancing to face Austria Wien. The first leg happened on 30 July. Austria Wien won 1–0 from a goal from Daniel Royer. The second leg happened on 7 August. The match ended 0–0. Austria Wien won 1–0 on aggregate. Two days later, the draw for the play–off round of Champions League happened. Austria Wien were drawn against Dinamo Zagreb. The first leg was played on 21 August. Austria Wien won the first leg 2–0 with goals from Marin Leovac and Marko Stanković. The second leg was played on 27 August. Dinamo Zagreb won the match 3–2, but lost on aggregate 4–3. Florian Mader and Roman Kienast scored for Austria Wien. Marcelo Brozović, Junior Fernándes, and Fatos Bećiraj scored for Dinamo Zagreb. This is the first time that Austria Wien qualified for the Group Stage of Champions League and the first Austrian club to qualify for the Group Stage since Rapid Wien qualified for the Group Stage in 2005. Two days later, the draw for the Champions League Group Stage took place. Austria Wien was drawn into Group G and would face Porto, Atlético Madrid, and Zenit Saint Petersburg. Austria Wien faced Porto on matchday one of the Champions League group stage. Porto won 1–0 from a goal from Lucho González. Austria Wien was in third place in the table after the completion of the first matchday. Austria Wien then faced Zenit Saint Petersburg 1 October. The match ended in a 0–0 draw. The draw is the first point that an Austrian club has earned in the Group Stage of Champions League since Sturm Graz defeated Panathinaikos on 20 February 2001. Austria Wien finished the matchday in third place. Austria Wien faced Atlético Madrid on 22 October. Atlético Madrid won 3–0 with goals from Raúl Garcia and Diego Costa. Diego Costa scored two goals. Austria Wien finished the matchday in fourth place. Austria Wien played Atlético Madrid on 6 November. Atlético Madrid won 4–0 with goals from Miranda, Raúl García, Filipe Luís and Diego Costa. Austria Wien finished the matchday in fourth place. Austria Wien faced Porto on 26 November. The match ended in a 1–1 draw. Roman Kienast scored for Austria Wien. This is the first time since 7 December 2005 that an Austrian Club has scored in the Group Stage. Jackson Martínez scored for Porto. Austria Wien finished the matchday in fourth place. With the draw, Austria Wien officially finished the group stage in last place and are eliminated from all European competitions. Austria Wien played their last match in the Group Stage on 11 December against Zenit Saint Petersburg. Austria Wien won 4–1. This was Austria Wien's first ever victory in the Group Stage of Champions League. This is also the first victory in the Group Stage of Champions League by an Austrian club since Sturm Graz defeated Panathinaikos 2–1 on 20 February 2001. Philipp Hosiner, Tomáš Jun, and Roman Kienast scored for Austria Wien. Philipp Hosiner scored two goals. Aleksandr Kerzhakov scored for Zenit Saint Petersburg. Austria Wien finished the group in fourth and last place.

=== Champions League results ===
Win Draw Loss Postponed

==== Qualifying and Play–off rounds results ====
Leg	Date^{1}	Stadium	Opponent	Result^{2}	Agg. score^{2}	Attendance	Goalscorers		Ref.
Leg	Date^{1}	Stadium	Opponent	Result^{2}	Agg. score^{2}	Attendance	Austria Wien	Opponent	Ref.
Third qualifying round
FL	30 July – 18:00	H	FH	1–0	—	8,075	Royer 25'	—	
SL	6 August – 18:00	A	FH	0–0	1–0	2,647	—	—	
Play–off round
FL	21 August – 20:45	A	Dinamo Zagreb	2–0	—	25,000	Leovac 68'; Stanković 75'	—	
SL	27 August – 20:45	H	Dinamo Zagreb	2–3	4–3	10,500	Mader 5'; Kienast 82'	Brozović 33'; Fernandes 43'; Bećiraj 70'	

==== Group stage ====
Overall								Home						Away					
Pld	W	D	L	GF	GA	GD	Pts	W	D	L	GF	GA	GD	W	D	L	GF	GA	GD
6	1	2	3	5	10	−5	5	1	0	2	4	5	−1	0	2	1	1	5	−4

===== Table =====
Last updated: 11 December 2013.
Source: Match results

Pos	Team	Pld	W	D	L	GF	GA	GD	Pts	Qualification	ATM	ZEN	POR	AWI
1	(Spain) Atlético Madrid	6	5	1	0	15	3	+12	16	Advance to knockout phase	—	3–1	2–0	4–0
2	(Russia) Zenit Saint Petersburg	6	1	3	2	5	9	−4	6	Advance to knockout phase	1–1	—	1–1	0–0
3	(Portugal) Porto	6	1	2	3	4	7	−3	5 (Note: Head-to-head points: Porto 4, Austria Wien 1.)	Transfer to Europa League	1–2	0–1	—	1–1
4	Austria Wien	6	1	2	3	5	10	−5	5		0–3	4–1	0–1	—

Source: UEFA

===== Results =====
MD	Date^{1}	Stadium	Opponent	Result^{2}	Attendance	Goalscorers		Ref.
MD	Date^{1}	Stadium	Opponent	Result^{2}	Attendance	Austria Wien	Opponent	Ref.
1	18 September – 20:45	H	Porto	0–1	37,500	—	González 56'	
2	1 October – 18:00	A	Zenit Saint Petersburg	0–0	18,785	—	—	
3	22 October – 20:45	H	Atlético Madrid	0–3	45,675	—	García 8'; Costa 20', 54'	
4	6 November – 20:45	A	Atlético Madrid	0–4	29,841	—	Miranda 11'; García 25'; Filipe Luís 45'; Costa 82'	
5	26 November – 20:45	A	Porto	1–1	24,809	Kienast 11'	Martínez 48'	
6	11 December – 20:45	H	Zenit Saint Petersburg	4–1	37,500	Hosiner 44', 51'; Jun 48'; Kienast 90'	Kerzhakov 35'	

===== Table by matchday =====
Pos.	MP	Pts.	GD	Ref.
3	1	0	–1	
3	2	1	–1	
4	3	1	–4	
4	4	1	–8	
4	5	2	–8	
4	6	5	–5	

== Team statistics ==
=== Overall record ===
Competition	First match	Last match	Starting round	Final position	Record							
Competition	First match	Last match	Starting round	Final position	G	W	D	L	GF	GA	GD	Win %
Bundesliga	20 July	10 May	Matchday 1		29	12	9	8	48	35	+13	41.38
Austrian Cup	12 July	24 September	First round	Second round	2	1	0	1	4	2	+2	50.00
Champions League	30 July	11 December	Third qualifying round	Group Stage	10	3	3	4	10	13	−3	30.00
Total					41	16	12	13	62	50	+12	39.02
Updated: 26 March 2014

=== Record by head coach ===
Head coach	From	To	Record							
Head coach	From	To	M	W	D	L	GF	GA	GD	Win %
Nenad Bjelica	17 June	16 February	35	12	10	13	53	48	+5	34.29
Herbert Gager	16 February	Present	6	4	2	0	9	2	+7	66.67
Updated: 26 March 2014

=== Record vs. opponent ===
Opponent	Record							
Opponent	M	W	D	L	GF	GA	GD	Win %
Wiener Neustadt	3	2	1	0	9	1	+8	66.67
Wacker Innsbruck	3	2	1	0	8	2	+6	66.67
Wolfsberg	3	2	1	0	5	1	+4	66.67
Sturm Graz	3	2	1	0	6	4	+2	66.67
Admira	4	2	1	1	4	2	+2	50.00
Grödig	3	1	0	2	4	4	+0	33.33
Red Bull Salzburg	4	1	0	3	5	11	−6	25.00
Ried	3	0	3	0	5	5	+0	0.00
Rapid Wien	3	0	1	2	1	4	−3	0.00

== Player information ==
=== Squad and statistics ===
As of 22 February 2014

No.	Nat.	Player	Total			Bundesliga			Austrian Cup			Champions League^{3}			Ref.
No.	Nat.	Player	App.	Min.	Gls	App.	Min.	Gls	App.	Min.	Gls	App.	Min.	Gls	Ref.
Goalkeepers
1	(Austria)	Pascal Grünwald	0	0	0	0	0	0	0	0	0	0	0	0	
13	(Austria)	Heinz Lindner	35	3,150	0	24	2,160	0	1	90	0	10	900	0	
26	(Croatia)	Ivan Kardum	1	90	0	0	0	0	1	90	0	0	0	0	
31	(Bosnia and Herzegovina)	Osman Hadžikić	0	0	0	0	0	0	0	0	0	0	0	0	
77	(Austria)	Tino Casali	0	0	0	0	0	0	0	0	0	0	0	0	
Defenders
4	(Croatia)	Kaja Rogulj	21	1,876	1	13	1,156	1	1	90	0	7	630	0	
5	(Austria)	Lukas Rotpuller	11	843	0	8	573	0	2	180	0	1	90	0	
14	(Austria)	Manuel Ortlechner	33	2,970	0	22	1,980	0	1	90	0	10	900	0	
15	(Austria)	Christian Ramsebner	9	791	0	7	611	2	0	0	0	2	180	0	
29	(Austria)	Markus Suttner	35	2,854	0	24	1,952	1	2	180	0	9	722	0	
30	(Austria)	Fabian Koch	26	2,241	0	17	1,431	0	1	90	0	8	720	0	
33	(Austria)	Phillipp Koblischek	0	0	0	0	0	0	0	0	0	0	0	0	
34	(Austria)	Michael Blauensteiner	0	0	0	0	0	0	0	0	0	0	0	0	
40	(Austria)	Petar Gluhakovic	0	0	0	0	0	0	0	0	0	0	0	0	
43	(Austria)	Michael Lechner	0	0	0	0	0	0	0	0	0	0	0	0	
44	(Austria)	Marco Stark	0	0	0	0	0	0	0	0	0	0	0	0	
47	(Austria)	Eric Plattensteiner	0	0	0	0	0	0	0	0	0	0	0	0	
Midfielders
3	(Spain)	David de Paula^{4}	3	252	0	3	252	1	0	0	0	0	0	0	
6	(Austria)	Bernhard Luxbacher	1	14	0	1	14	0	0	0	0	0	0	0	
10	(Austria)	Alexander Grünwald	12	717	3	8	531	2	1	70	1	3	116	0	
17	(Austria)	Florian Mader	33	2,524	1	21	1,550	0	2	166	0	10	808	1	
18	(Austria)	Thomas Murg	19	1,197	2	12	895	2	1	82	0	6	220	0	
20	(Austria)	Alexander Gorgon	5	367	1	4	293	1	1	74	0	0	0	0	
21	(Austria)	Sascha Horvath	3	37	0	3	37	0	0	0	0	0	0	0	
25	(Australia)	James Holland	32	2,683	0	22	1,821	0	1	90	0	9	772	0	
27	(Austria)	Emir Dilaver	21	1,532	0	14	1,057	0	2	180	0	5	295	0	
28	(Austria)	Daniel Royer	32	2,212	5	21	1,404	4	1	16	0	10	792	1	
32	(Austria)	Michael Endlicher	0	0	0	0	0	0	0	0	0	0	0	0	
34	(Austria)	Peter Michorl	0	0	0	0	0	0	0	0	0	0	0	0	
35^{5}	(Austria)	Thomas Salamon^{4}	3	269	1	3	269	1	0	0	0	0	0	0	
36	(Austria)	Dominik Prokop	0	0	0	0	0	0	0	0	0	0	0	0	
39	(Austria)	Tarkan Serberst	0	0	0	0	0	0	0	0	0	0	0	0	
42	(Libya)	Ismael Tajouri-Shradi	0	0	0	0	0	0	0	0	0	0	0	0	
46	(Serbia)	Marko Zlatković	0	0	0	0	0	0	0	0	0	0	0	0	
Forwards
11	(Czech Republic)	Tomáš Jun	24	1,669	0	15	932	2	2	172	1	7	545	1	
16	(Austria)	Philipp Hosiner	34	2,681	0	22	1,791	9	2	98	1	10	792	2	
19	(Austria)	Marko Stanković	24	1,360	8	16	808	6	1	20	1	7	532	1	
23	(Austria)	Srđan Spiridonović	8	226	0	5	189	0	1	8	0	2	29	0	
24	(Austria)	Roman Kienast	24	1,135	8	16	766	5	1	90	0	7	279	3	
35^{5}	(Austria)	Nikola Zivotic	0	0	0	0	0	0	0	0	0	0	0	0	
37	(Austria)	Alexander Frank	0	0	0	0	0	0	0	0	0	0	0	0	
92	(Norway)	Ola Kamara^{4}	1	12	0	1	12	0	0	0	0	0	0	0	
Players who left after the start of the season.
2	(Austria)	Sebastian Wimmer	0	0	0	0	0	0	0	0	0	0	0	0	
7	(Slovenia)	Dare Vršič	0	0	0	0	0	0	0	0	0	0	0	0	
8	(Austria)	Tomáš Šimkovič	15	727	1	10	449	1	1	90	0	4	188	0	
9	(Austria)	Rubin Okotie	17	346	1	13	308	1	1	14	0	3	24	0	
22	(Austria)	Marin Leovac	13	570	1	7	364	0	0	0	0	6	206	1	
			—	—	—	—		—				—	—	—	—

== Awards ==
- Heinz Lindner became Austrian footballer of the year on 2 February.

== Notes ==
- 1.Kickoff time in Central European Time/Central European Summer Time.
- 2.Austria Wien goals listed first.
- 3.Statistics include 4 qualifying phase matches.
- 4.Players joined the club in January 2014.
- 5.Thomas Salamon is registered as no. 35 in the Bundesliga while Nikola Zivotic is registered as no. 35 with UEFA.
