= 2012–13 Austrian Football First League =

Austrian Football First League
- Season: 2012–13
- Promoted: Grödig
- Relegated: Blau-Weiß Linz
- Matches: 180
- Goals: 524 (2.91 per match)
- Top goalscorer: Johannes Aigner (18 goals)
- Biggest home win: Austria Lustenau 5–0 Kapfenberger SV (20 July 2012); Horn 5–0 Austria Lustenau (8 March 2013); Hartberg 6–1 Lustenau (30 April 2013)
- Biggest away win: St. Pölten 1–7 Kapfenberger SV (1 March 2013)
- Highest scoring: St. Pölten 1–7 Kapfenberger SV (1 March 2013)

The 2012–13 Austrian Football First League was the 39th season of the Austrian second-level football league. It began on 19 July 2012 and ended on 24 May 2013.

== Teams ==
=== Stadia and locations ===
Location of teams in the 2012–13 Austrian Football First League

Team	Stadium	Capacity
Austria Lustenau	Reichshofstadion	8,800
Blau-Weiß Linz	Linzer Stadion	25,138
First Vienna	Hohe Warte Stadium	5,000
Grödig	Untersberg-Arena	2,955
Hartberg	Stadion Hartberg	6,000
Horn	Sportplatz	3,000
Kapfenberger SV	Franz Fekete Stadium	12,000
Lustenau	Reichshofstadion	8,800
Rheindorf Altach	Cashpoint Arena	8,900
St. Pölten	Voith-Platz	10,000

=== Personnel and kits ===
Team	Manager	Captain	Kit manufacturer	Shirt sponsor
Austria Lustenau	(Iceland) Helgi Kolviðsson	(Austria) Harald Dürr	Umbro	ZIMA
Blau-Weiß Linz	(Germany) Edmund Stöhr	(Austria) Konstantin Wawra	Lotto	Lenze
First Vienna	(Austria) Alfred Tatar	(Austria) Ernst Dospel	Nike	PayLife
Grödig	(Austria) Adi Hütter	(Spain) Ione Cabrera	Nike	Scholz
Hartberg	(Austria) Paul Gludovatz	(Austria) Jürgen Rindler	Jako	Lopoca
Horn	(Austria) Michael Streiter	(Serbia) Aleksandar Djordjević	Umbro	Shopping Horn
Kapfenberger SV	(Austria) Klaus Schmidt	(Austria) David Sencar	Erima	Murauer
Lustenau	(Austria) Daniel Madlener	(Austria) Mario Bolter	Nike	Prometheus
Rheindorf Altach	(Austria) Damir Canadi	(Austria) Martin Kobras	Jako	Cashpoint
St. Pölten	(Austria) Martin Scherb	(Austria) Michael Popp	Jako	Hypo Noe Gruppe

=== Managerial changes ===
Team	Outgoing manager	Manner of departure	Date of vacancy	Position in table	Replaced by	Date of appointment
Grödig	(Austria) Heimo Pfeifenberger	Contract expired	31 May 2012	Pre-season	(Austria) Adi Hütter	
Hartberg	(Austria) Walter Hörmann	Contract expired	11 June 2012	Pre-season	(Austria) Andreas Moriggl	
Rheindorf Altach	(Germany) Edmund Stöhr	Contract expired	30 June 2012	Pre-season	(Germany) Rainer Scharinger	
Blau-Weiß Linz	(Austria) Thomas Weissenböck	Sacked	22 September 2012	9th	(Germany) Edmund Stöhr	
Hartberg	(Austria) Andreas Moriggl	Sacked	15 October 2012	7th	(Austria) Paul Gludovatz	
Kapfenberger SV	(Germany) Thomas von Heesen	Appointed as Sport director	10 November 2012	9th	(Austria) Klaus Schmidt	
Rheindorf Altach	(Germany) Rainer Scharinger	Sacked	7 January 2013	4th	(Austria) Damir Canadi	
Lustenau	(Austria) Damir Canadi	Signed by Rheindorf Altach	8 January 2013	5th	(Austria) Daniel Madlener	

== League table ==
Pos	Team	Pld	W	D	L	GF	GA	GD	Pts	Promotion or relegation
1	Grödig (P)	36	23	6	7	71	30	+41	75	Promotion to 2013–14 Austrian Bundesliga
2	Rheindorf Altach	36	19	8	9	57	39	+18	65	
3	Austria Lustenau	36	18	7	11	60	39	+21	61	
4	St. Pölten	36	14	12	10	65	60	+5	54	
5	Kapfenberger SV	36	14	11	11	56	50	+6	53	
6	Horn	36	13	7	16	50	55	−5	46	
7	First Vienna	36	13	7	16	48	64	−16	46	
8	Lustenau (R)	36	10	8	18	44	66	−22	38	Relegation to 2013–14 Austrian Regionalliga
9	Hartberg	36	8	9	19	35	54	−19	33	
10	Blau-Weiß Linz (R)	36	5	11	20	38	67	−29	26	Qualification to Relegation playoffs

Source: Austrian Football First League (in German)
Rules for classification: 1) points; 2) goal difference; 3) number of goals scored.
(P) Promoted; (R) Relegated

== Top scorers ==
Rank	Player	Club	Goals
1	(Austria) Johannes Aigner	Rheindorf Altach	18
2	(Austria) David Witteveen	Grödig	17
3	(Brazil) Thiago	Austria Lustenau	13
4	(Spain) Daniel Lucas	St. Pölten	12
5	(Serbia) Miroslav Milošević	Horn	11
5	(Austria) Philipp Zulechner	Horn	11
7	(Austria) Furkan Aydoğdu	Lustenau	10
7	(Austria) Sandro Gotal	Horn	10
7	(Austria) Thomas Salamon	Grödig	10
10	(Austria) Patrick Salomon	Austria Lustenau	9
10	(Austria) Philipp Wendler	Kapfenberger SV	9

== Promotion/relegation playoffs ==
=== Teams ===
- FC Blau-Weiß Linz (finished 10th in First League)
- SC-ESV Parndorf 1919 (champions of Regionalliga Ost)
- LASK Linz (champions of Regionalliga Mitte)
- FC Liefering (champions of Regionalliga West)

=== First leg ===
3 June 2013
19:00

Liefering	2 – 0	LASK Linz
Savić 71'; Ćorić 90+2'	Report

Red Bull Arena, Wals-Siezenheim
Attendance: 2,280
Referee: Dominik Ouschan

3 June 2013
19:30

Parndorf	2 – 1	Blau-Weiß Linz
Horvath 33'; Koller 75'	Report	Hartl 54'

Heidebodenstadion, Parndorf
Attendance: 14,700
Referee: Gerhard Grobelnik

=== Second leg ===
6 June 2013
20:00

LASK Linz	0 – 3	Liefering
	Report	André Silva 4'; Savić 27'; Konrad 47'

Linzer Stadion, Linz
Attendance: 6,700
Referee: Rene Eisner

FC Liefering win 5-0 on aggregate and are promoted to the Austrian First League

7 June 2013
18:30

Blau-Weiß Linz	0 – 1	Parndorf
	Report	Kummerer 28' (pen.)

Linzer Stadion, Linz
Attendance: 1,500
Referee: Robert Schörgenhofer

SC-ESV Parndorf 1919 win 3-1 on aggregate and are promoted to the Austrian First League
