= Konstantin Kerschbaumer =

Austrian footballer

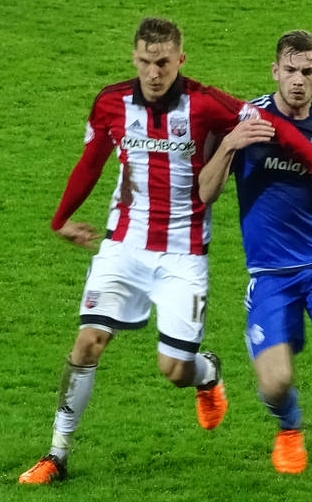
- Kerschbaumer (left) playing for Brentford in 2015.

Personal information
- Full name: Konstantin Kerschbaumer
- Date of birth: 1 July 1992 (age 34)
- Place of birth: Tulln an der Donau, Austria
- Height: 1.80 m (5 ft 11 in)
- Position: Central midfielder

Team information
- Current team: Wiener Sport-Club
- Number: 7

Youth career
- 1998–2006: FC Tulln
- 2006–2009: AKA St. Pölten
- 2009–2011: Rapid Wien

Senior career*
Years	Team	Apps	(Gls)
2010–2011	Rapid Wien II	32	(7)
2011–2012	→ Vienna (loan)	32	(5)
2012–2013	→ St. Pölten (loan)	33	(6)
2013–2015	St. Pölten	53	(9)
2015	Admira Wacker	16	(1)
2015–2018	Brentford	52	(1)
2017–2018	→ Arminia Bielefeld (loan)	31	(8)
2018–2019	FC Ingolstadt 04	29	(3)
2019–2022	1. FC Heidenheim	46	(4)
2022–2024	Wolfsberger AC	28	(2)
2024	Wolfsberger AC II	6	(1)
2024–2025	SV Stripfing	34	(1)
2025–	Wiener Sport-Club	14	(4)

International career
2007	Austria U16	1	(0)
2008–2009	Austria U17	9	(1)
2009–2010	Austria U18	5	(1)
2010	Austria U19	5	(0)
- * Club domestic league appearances and goals as of 21:31, 2 August 2026 (UTC)

Konstantin Kerschbaumer (born 1 July 1992) is an Austrian professional footballer who plays for Austrian Regionalliga East club Wiener Sport-Club as a central midfielder.

Kerschbaumer came to prominence in his homeland with SKN St. Pölten, from whom he transferred to top-flight club Admira Wacker Mödling in 2015. He subsequently played in England and Germany, before returning to Austria with Wolfsberger AC in 2022. Kerschbaumer won 20 international caps for Austria at youth level.

== Club career ==
=== Rapid Wien ===
A central midfielder, Kerschbaumer began his career in Austria with local clubs FC Tulln and AKA St. Pölten, progressing to help the latter club to the 2008–09 Jugendliga U19 title. He signed for Bundesliga club SK Rapid Wien in 2009, making 20 appearances and scoring five goals for the U19 team and progressing to the reserves, scoring two goals in four late-season Regionalliga Ost appearances. He was a reserve team regular during the 2010–11 season, making 29 appearances and scoring four goals. Kerschbaumer joined Erste Liga club First Vienna on loan for the duration of the 2011–12 season, making 33 appearances and scoring five goals. After also spending the 2012–13 season away on loan, Kerschbaumer departed the Weststadion during the 2013 off-season.

=== SKN St. Pölten ===
On 10 July 2012, Kerschbaumer joined Erste Liga club SKN St. Pölten on a season-long loan. He made 34 appearances and scored six goals during the 2012–13 season and joined the club on a permanent contract after the campaign. He improved his tally to seven goals in a successful 2013–14 season for the club, in which they finished fourth in the league to qualify for the Europa League. Kerschbaumer played in every match of St. Pölten's run to the Austrian Cup final, which ended in a 4–2 defeat to Red Bull Salzburg.

Kerschbaumer made 27 appearances and scored three goals during the first half of the 2014–15 season, before departing the club in January 2015. Kerschbaumer made 100 appearances and scored 16 goals during his two and a half years at the NV Arena.

=== Admira Wacker Mödling ===
Kerschbaumer signed for Bundesliga strugglers Admira Wacker Mödling on 20 January 2015 on a 2 1/2-year contract. He made 16 appearances and scored one goal during the second half of the 2014–15 season, helping the club to finish above the relegation place. He departed the club in late June.

=== Brentford ===
On 1 July 2015, Kerschbaumer moved to England to sign for Championship club Brentford on a four-year contract for an undisclosed fee and became the first Austrian to sign for the Griffin Park club. He began his Bees career as a starter under Marinus Dijkhuizen, before being dropped to the bench by Dijkhuizen's replacement Lee Carsley in early October. Despite utilising him as a substitute regularly, Carsley admitted in early November that Kerschbaumer "needs a lot of coaching. He runs as fast as he can everywhere without being effective". He alternated between starting roles and the bench through to the end of the 2015–16 season, making 31 appearances. Kerschbaumer's 6 assists was the second-highest at the club, after Alan Judge.

Kerschbaumer made two early 2016–17 season appearances before falling out of favour with head coach Dean Smith and dropping out of the squad in mid-September 2016. On 5 February 2017, while making just his seventh appearance of the season, Kerschbaumer finally scored his first goal for the club in a 3–3 draw with Brighton & Hove Albion. Injury to Josh McEachran later that month allowed Kerschbaumer to break into the starting lineup and he started the majority of the remaining matches of the season. He finished the 2016–17 season with 21 appearances and one goal.

In late June 2017, Kerschbaumer agreed a one-year extension option to his contract and joined 2. Bundesliga club Arminia Bielefeld on a season-long loan. He made 32 appearances and scored eight goals during the 2017–18 season, in which the Blues narrowly missed out on the promotion playoff place. Kerschbaumer departed Brentford on 1 June 2018 and made 52 appearances and scored one goal during two seasons as a first team player at Griffin Park.

=== FC Ingolstadt 04 ===
On 1 June 2018, Kerschbaumer joined 2. Bundesliga club FC Ingolstadt 04 on a three-year contract for an undisclosed fee (reported to be £900,000), effective 1 July 2018. He made 29 appearances and scored four goals during a disastrous 2018–19 season, which culminated in relegation to the 3. Liga. Kerschbaumer departed the club in September 2019.

=== 1. FC Heidenheim ===
On 2 September 2019, Kerschbaumer moved back up to the 2. Bundesliga to sign a three-year contract with 1. FC Heidenheim, for an undisclosed fee. He made 26 appearances and scored three goals during a 2019–20 season which ended with defeat in the Bundesliga promotion play-off. Following a mid-table 2020–21 season in which he made 19 appearances and scored one goal, a torn muscle fibre interrupted the early months of Kerschbaumer's 2021–22 season. After his return, he made just five appearances and late in the season, it was announced that Kerschbaumer would be released when his contract expired in June 2022. Kerschbaumer ended his three-season spell at the Voith-Arena with 50 appearances and four goals.

=== Wolfsberger AC ===
On 23 May 2022, Kerschbaumer signed a three-year contract with Austrian Bundesliga club Wolfsberger AC on a free transfer, effective 1 July 2022. He made 34 appearances and scored three goals during a 2022–23 season which culminated with defeat in the Europa Conference League play-offs. Kerschbaumer was frozen out during the 2023–24 season and made just two substitute appearances. He departed the club in September 2024.

=== SV Stripfing ===
On 7 September 2024, Kerschbaumer signed an undisclosed-length contract with 2. Liga club SV Stripfing. He made 25 appearances during the 2024–25 season, in which the club narrowly avoided relegation. Kerschbaumer was retained for the 2025–26 season. He made three appearances prior to departing the club in December 2025.

=== Wiener Sport-Club ===
In December 2025, Kerschbaumer transferred to Austrian Regionalliga East club Wiener Sport-Club. He made 13 appearances and scored four goals during the remainder of the 2025–26 season. Kerschbaumer was retained for the 2026–27 season.

== International career ==
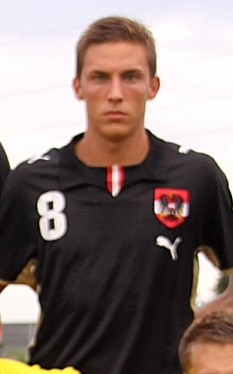
Kerschbaumer lining up with the Austria U19 team in 2010

Kerschbaumer won 20 caps and scored two goals for Austria between U16 to U19 level between 2007 and 2010. He was a part of the U17 team which won the 2008 U17 Toto Cup.

== Style of play ==
Kerschbaumer was described by Marinus Dijkhuizen as a "box to box" midfielder. In June 2017, Brentford goalkeeper Dan Bentley stated that Kerschbaumer was the best finisher at the club.

== Personal life ==
Kerschbaumer's father Toni is a youth coach at FC Tulln.

== Career statistics ==
As of match played 31 July 2026

Appearances and goals by club, season and competition
Club	Season	League			National cup (Note: Includes Austrian Cup, FA Cup, DFB-Pokal)		League cup (Note: Includes EFL Cup)		Europe		Other		Total	
Club	Season	Division	Apps	Goals	Apps	Goals	Apps	Goals	Apps	Goals	Apps	Goals	Apps	Goals
Rapid Wien II	2009–10	Austrian Regionalliga Ost	4	2	—		—		—		—		4	2
Rapid Wien II	2010–11	Austrian Regionalliga Ost	28	5	1	0	—		—		—		29	5
Rapid Wien II	Total		32	7	1	0	—		—		—		33	7
First Vienna (loan)	2011–12	Austrian Erste Liga	32	5	1	0	—		—		—		33	5
SKN St. Pölten (loan)	2012–13	Austrian Erste Liga	33	6	1	0	—		—		—		34	6
SKN St. Pölten	2013–14	Austrian Erste Liga	33	7	6	0	—		—		—		39	7
SKN St. Pölten	2014–15	Austrian Erste Liga	20	2	3	0	—		4 (Note: Appearances in Europa League)	1	—		27	3
SKN St. Pölten	Total		86	15	11	0	—		4	1	—		100	16
Admira Wacker Mödling	2014–15	Austrian Bundesliga	16	1	—		—		—		—		16	1
Brentford	2015–16	Championship	30	0	1	0	0	0	—		—		31	0
Brentford	2016–17	Championship	20	1	1	0	0	0	—		—		21	1
Brentford	Total		50	1	2	0	0	0	—		—		52	1
Arminia Bielefeld (loan)	2017–18	German 2. Bundesliga	31	8	1	0	—		—		—		32	8
FC Ingolstadt 04	2018–19	German 2. Bundesliga	27	3	1	0	—		—		1 (Note: Appearance in 2. Bundesliga relegation play-offs)	1	29	4
FC Ingolstadt 04	2019–20	German 3. Liga	0	0	0	0	—		—		2 (Note: Appearances in Bavarian Cup)	1	2	1
FC Ingolstadt 04	Total		27	3	1	0	—		—		3	2	31	5
1. FC Heidenheim	2019–20	German 2. Bundesliga	23	3	1	0	—		—		2 (Note: Appearances in Bundesliga promotion play-offs)	0	26	3
1. FC Heidenheim	2020–21	German 2. Bundesliga	18	1	1	0	—		—		—		19	1
1. FC Heidenheim	2021–22	German 2. Bundesliga	5	0	0	0	—		—		—		5	0
1. FC Heidenheim	Total		46	4	2	0	—		—		2	0	50	4
Wolfsberger AC	2022–23	Austrian Bundesliga	27	2	2	1	—		4 (Note: Appearances in Europa Conference League)	0	1 (Note: Appearance in Austrian Bundesliga Europa Conference League play-offs)	0	34	3
Wolfsberger AC	2023–24	Austrian Bundesliga	1	0	1	0	—		—		0	0	2	0
Wolfsberger AC	Total		28	2	3	1	—		4	0	1	0	36	3
Wolfsberger AC II	2023–24	Austrian Regionalliga Central	5	1	—		—		—		—		5	1
Wolfsberger AC II	2024–25	Austrian Regionalliga Central	1	0	—		—		—		—		1	0
Wolfsberger AC II	Total		6	1	—		—		—		—		6	1
SV Stripfing	2024–25	Austrian 2. Liga	23	1	2	0	—		—		—		25	1
SV Stripfing	2025–26	Austrian 2. Liga	11	0	2	0	—		—		—		13	0
SV Stripfing	Total		34	1	4	1	—		—		—		38	3
Wiener Sport-Club	2025–26	Austrian Regionalliga East	13	4	—		—		—		—		13	4
Wiener Sport-Club	2026–27	Austrian Regionalliga East	1	0	1	0	—		—		—		2	0
Wiener Sport-Club	Total		14	4	1	0	—		—		—		15	4
Career totals			302	52	27	1	0	0	8	1	6	2	443	56

== Honours ==
Austria U17

- U17 Toto Cup: 2008
