= Yüksel Sariyar =

Austrian footballer

Personal information
- Date of birth: 1 August 1979 (age 47)
- Place of birth: Vienna, Austria
- Height: 1.82 m (6 ft 0 in)
- Position: Midfielder

Youth career
- 1998–1997: Austria Wien

Senior career*
Years	Team	Apps	(Gls)
1997–1998	Austria Wien II	2	(0)
1999–2000	Gençlerbirliği	7	(0)
2000–2003	LASK Linz	55	(5)
2003–2004	Kocaelispor	30	(6)
2004–2007	Pasching	78	(9)
2007–2008	Austria Wien	25	(2)
2008–2009	Wiener Neustadt	10	(0)
2010	DAC Dunajská Streda	7	(0)
2011–2015	ASK Mannersdorf	74	(29)
2015	ASV Neufeld	11	(0)
2016	SC Ostbahn XI	3	(1)
2016–2017	SV Oberloisdorf	26	(5)
2018	SC Wolfsthal	10	(4)

International career
2005–2007	Austria	13	(1)

Managerial career
- 2013: ASK Mannersdorf (caretaker)
- 2014–2015: ASK Mannersdorf (player-coach)
- 2015: ASV Neufeld (player-coach)
- 2017–2018: FC Blau Weiß Wien
- 2019: SV Sigleß
- * Club domestic league appearances and goals

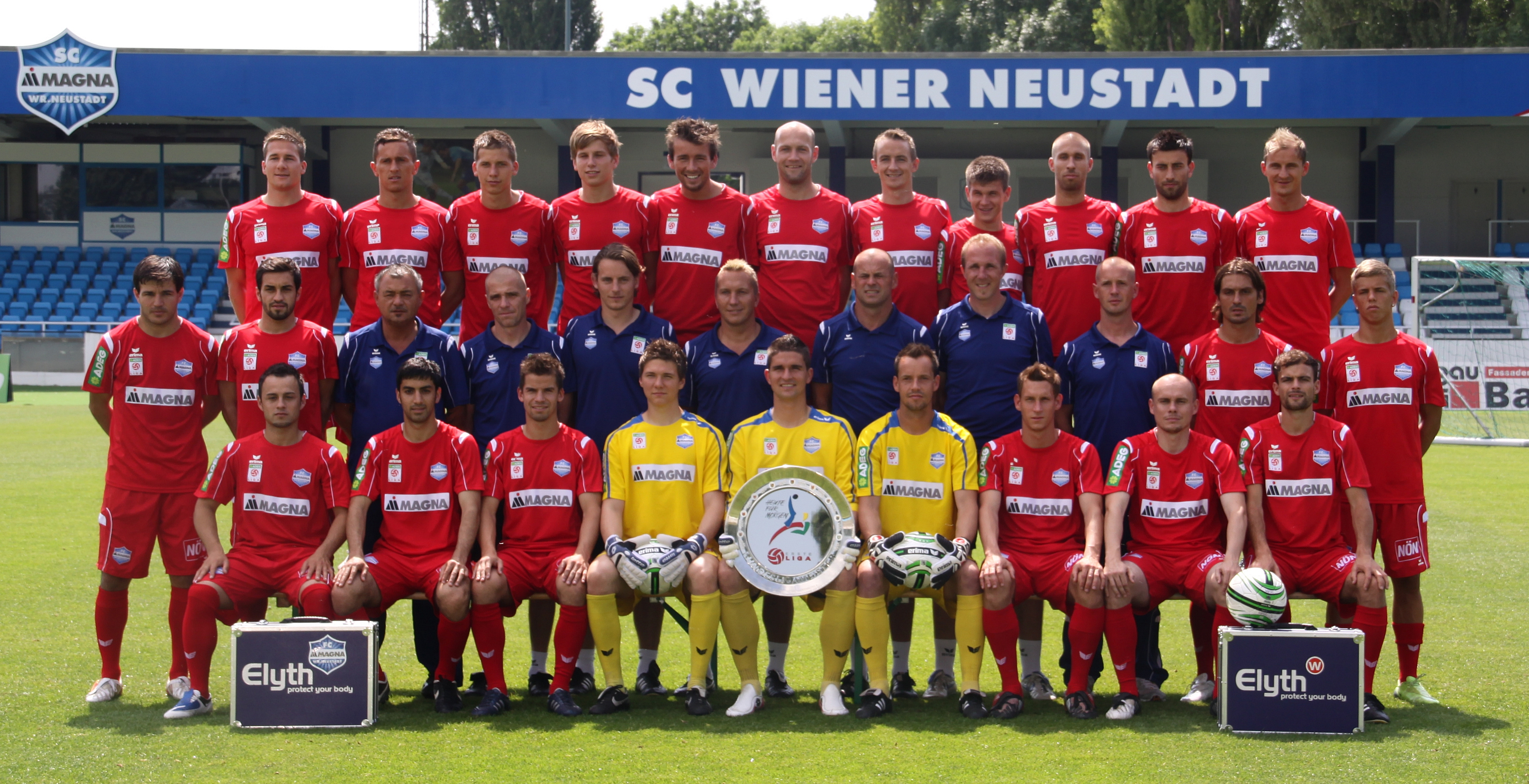
SC Wiener Neustadt, 2008/09 Austrian First League Champions – front row (from left to right): Harun Erbek, Taner Ari, Tomas Šimkovič, Udo Siebenhandl, Sašo Fornezzi, Manfred Razenböck, Michael Stanislaw, Václav Koloušek, Alexander Hauser – middle row: Sebastián Martínez, Mirnel Sadović, Michael Götz (masseur), Klaus Schmidt (assistant coach), Johannes Gasselseder (fitness coach), Manfred Schmid (assistant coach), Helmut Kraft (coach), Günter Kreissl (goalkeeper coach), Christoph Hallbrucker (masseur), Sanel Kuljic, Rene Felix – back row: Daniel Dunst, Mensur Kurtisi, Guido Burgstaller, Alexander Grünwald, Mario Reiter, Petr Johana, Johannes Aigner, Tomislav Micanovic, Patrick Wolf, Yüksel Sariyar and Wolfgang Klapf – missing: Georg Margreitter.

Yüksel Sariyar (born 1 August 1979) is an Austrian former professional footballer who played as a central midfielder.

== Club career ==
Sariyar came through the youth ranks at Austria Wien but he made his professional debut at Gençlerbirliği before joining LASK Linz in 2000. After three years in Linz he returned to Turkey for a year and then played three more years at Pasching before returning to Austria Wien for the 2007–08 season.

Most commonly he plays as a central midfielder, but he has played as full back and right winger before. In summer 2008, he left FK Austria Wien for newly formed Austrian second-division side Wiener Neustadt – who acquired the playing licence of Schwanenstadt for the 2008–09 campaign – and was joined by Austria Wien teammates Sanel Kuljic, Johannes Aigner and Sašo Fornezzi.

In January 2010 left Wiener Neustadt in the Austrian Second Division and signed for Slovak side DAC Dunajská Streda.

== International career ==
He made his debut for Austria in February 2005 against Latvia and earned 13 caps, scoring one goal. He was however not considered for Austria's EURO 2008 squad.
