= Johannes Aigner =

Austrian footballer

Hannes Aigner
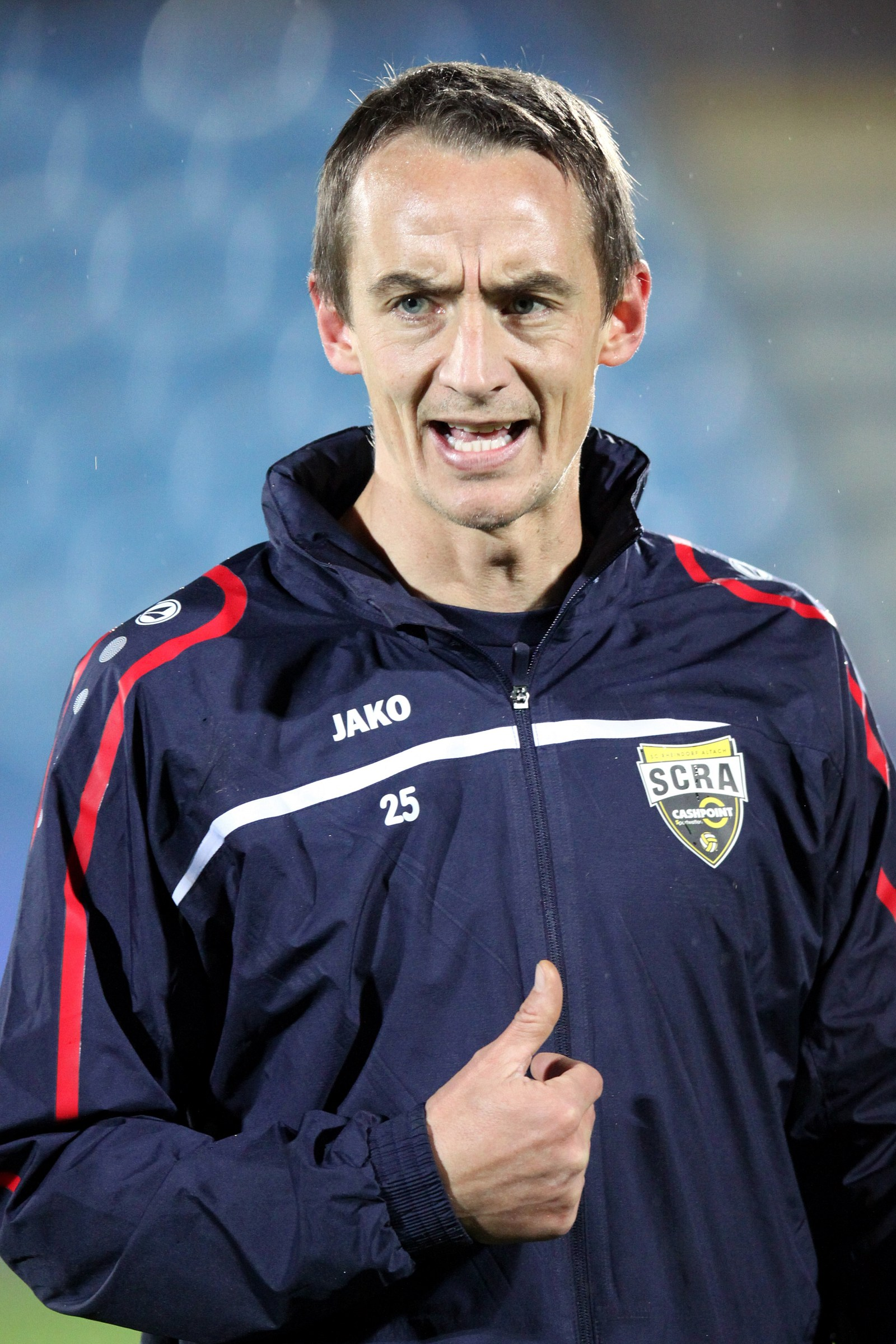
- Aigner with Wiener Neustadt in 2014

Personal information
- Date of birth: 16 March 1981 (age 45)
- Place of birth: Schwaz, Tirol, Austria
- Height: 1.86 m (6 ft 1 in)
- Position: Striker

Youth career
- SV Weerberg

Senior career*
Years	Team	Apps	(Gls)
1996–2000	SV Weerberg		
2000–2002	Innsbrucker SK		
2002–2006	FC Wacker Tirol	79	(11)
2006–2008	Austria Wien	58	(13)
2008–2011	FC Magna Wiener Neustadt	81	(36)
2011–2012	LASK	32	(14)
2012–2019	Rheindorf Altach	172	(76)
- * Club domestic league appearances and goals

Hannes Aigner (born 16 March 1981) is an Austrian former professional footballer who played as a striker.

== Career ==
Aigner made his Austrian Bundesliga debut with FC Wacker Tirol in the 2002–03 season and moved to Austria Wien after four seasons in Innsbruck. In summer 2008, he left Austria Wien for newly formed Austrian second-division side FC Magna Wiener Neustadt – who were acquiring the playing licence of SC Schwanenstadt for the 2008–09 campaign – where he was joined by Austria Wien teammates Sanel Kuljić, Yüksel Sariyar and Saso Fornezzi.

Aigner moved onto LASK in the First League for the 2011–12 season before transferring to SC Rheindorf Altach for the start of the 2012–13 season.

== Honours ==
Austria Wien

- Austrian Cup: 2007

FC Magna Wiener Neustadt

- Austrian First League: 2008–09

FC Wacker Tirol

- Austrian First League: 2003–04
