= Sanel Kuljić =

Austrian association football player (born 1977)

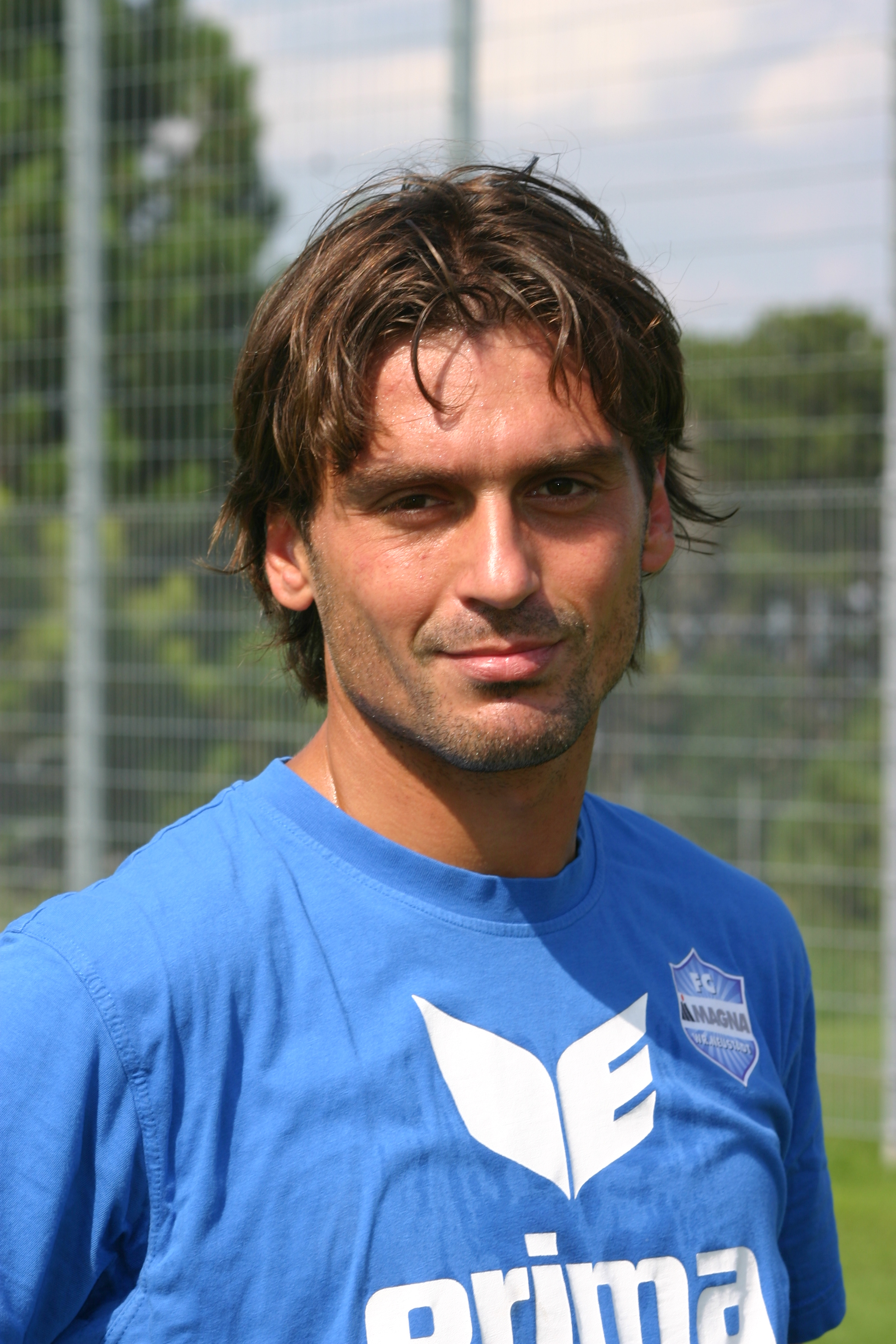
- Kuljić with Wiener Neustadt in 2008

Personal information
- Date of birth: 10 October 1977 (age 49)
- Place of birth: Salzburg, Austria
- Height: 1.79 m (5 ft 10 in)
- Position: Striker

Youth career
- SV Grödig
- 1995–1996: BNZ Salzburg

Senior career*
Years	Team	Apps	(Gls)
1996–1997	Austria Salzburg	1	(0)
1997–2000	PSV Salzburg		
2000–2001	BSV Bad Bleiberg	32	(11)
2001–2002	Pasching	46	(14)
2003	LASK Linz	14	(10)
2003–2006	SV Ried	92	(64)
2006–2007	Sion	22	(12)
2007–2008	Austria Wien	34	(11)
2008–2009	Wiener Neustadt	37	(18)
2010	Neuchâtel Xamax	12	(2)
2011	AEL	5	(0)
2012–2013	Kapfenberger SV	20	(3)

International career
2005–2007	Austria	20	(3)
- * Club domestic league appearances and goals

Sanel Kuljić (born 10 October 1977) is an Austrian former professional footballer who played as a striker.

== Personal life ==
Kuljić is of Bosnian descent; his father emigrated to Austria from SR Bosnia and Herzegovina in the 1970s. He spent his childhood in Salzburg and Grödig.

== Club career ==
Born in Salzburg, Kuljić started his professional career in Salzburg but made his name at Austrian Football First League side SV Pasching with whom he won promotion to the Austrian Football Bundesliga in 2002. He repeated that feat with SV Ried in 2005, when he also became 2nd division top goalscorer. In 2006, he became league top goalscorer and subsequently moved abroad to join Swiss side FC Sion but controversially returned to Austria after one year when he signed for Vienna club Austria Wien.

Kuljić left FK Austria Wien for newly formed Austrian second-division side FC Magna Wiener Neustadt – who acquired the playing licence of SC Schwanenstadt for the 2008–09 campaign – and was joined by Austria Wien team-mates Yüksel Sariyar and Sašo Fornezzi.

On 25 November, Kuljić scored four goals and his team Wiener Neustadt beat LASK Linz 4–1.

== International career ==
Kuljić was eligible to represent Bosnia and Herzegovina and Austria.

He made his debut for the Austria national team in an August 2005 friendly match against Scotland and has earned 20 caps, scoring three goals. He became a regular in the national team squad but was surprisingly overlooked for Euro 2008.

== Extortion ==
In November 2013, Kuljić was taken in custody after former Kapfenberger teammate Dominique Taboga claimed he was blackmailed by Kuljić to manipulate match results. After being accused of trying to manipulate 18 matches in the first two Austrian tiers, Kuljić was sentenced to five years in prison in autumn 2014. He was released early in March 2017 for good conduct.

== Drug dealing ==
In September 2019 Kuljić was arrested for drug dealing. In December he was handed a one-year prison sentence with Kuljić stating that he had only been involved with drug dealing because of a cocaine addiction he was suffering from.

== Honours ==
=== Club ===
Austria Salzburg

- Austrian Bundesliga: 1996–97

SV Pasching

- Erste Liga: 2001–02

SV Ried

- Erste Liga: 2004–05

SC Magna Wiener Neustadt

- Erste Liga: 2008–09

=== Individual ===
- Austrian Football Bundesliga top scorer: 2005–06
- Erste Liga top scorer: 2004–05
