= Martin Kobras =

Austrian footballer

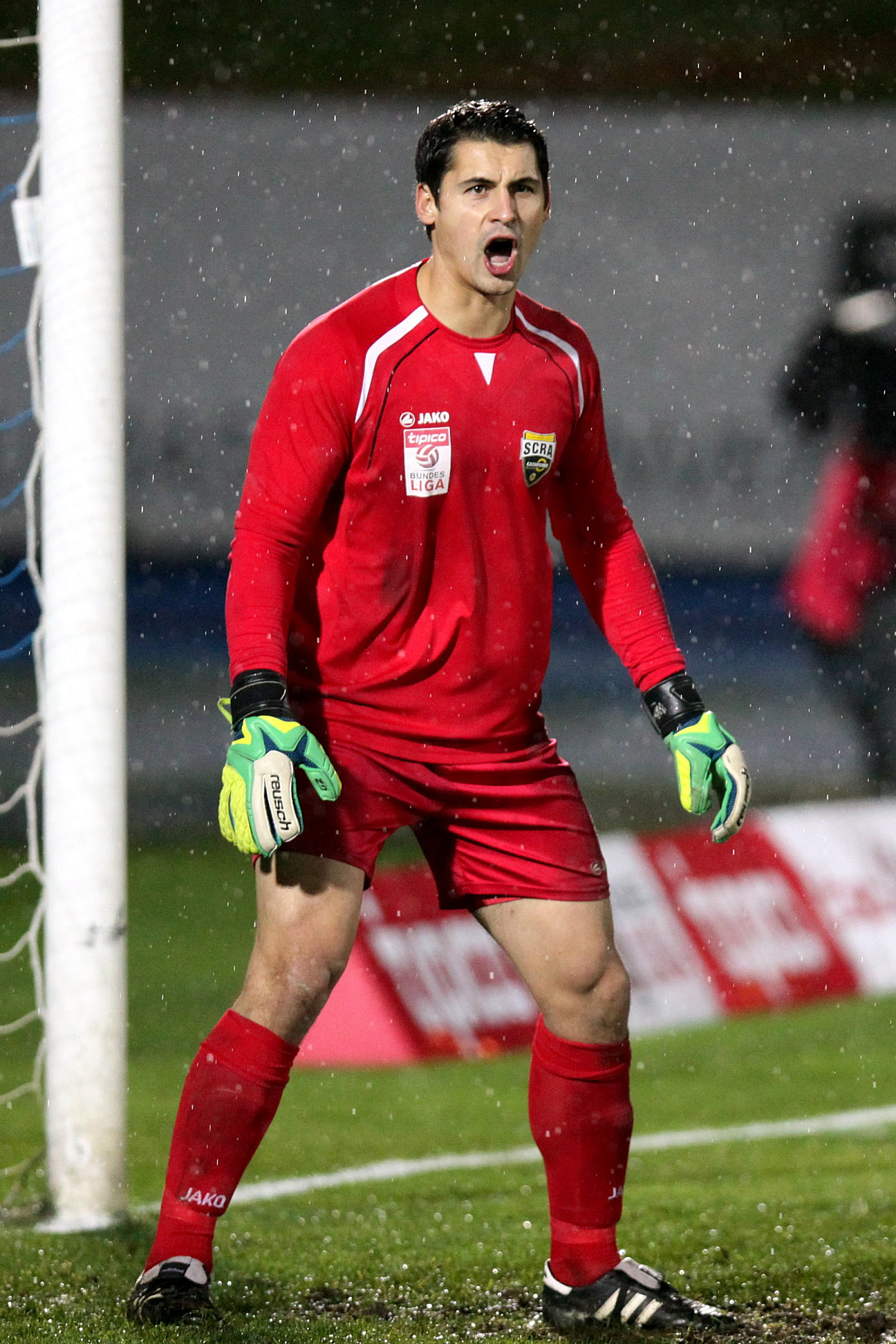
- Kobras playing for SC Rheindorf Altach in 2014

Personal information
- Date of birth: 19 June 1986 (age 40)
- Place of birth: Bregenz, Austria
- Height: 1.82 m (6 ft 0 in)
- Position: Goalkeeper

Team information
- Current team: FC Rotenberg

Youth career
- 1999–2000: Sturm Graz

Senior career*
Years	Team	Apps	(Gls)
2007–2009	Sturm Graz	5	(0)
2009–2021	SC Rheindorf Altach	341	(0)
2022–	FC Rotenberg	3	(0)
- * Club domestic league appearances and goals as of 16 April 2022

Martin Kobras (born 19 June 1986) is an Austrian football goalkeeper for FC Rotenberg.

== Club career ==
Up to the winter break of the 2010–11 season of the Austrian second-tier Erste Liga, Kobras had not missed a minute for his club.

In early 2022, Kobras moved to FC Rotenberg in the third-tier Eliteliga Vorarlberg.
