= Eldis Bajrami =

Macedonian-Albanian footballer

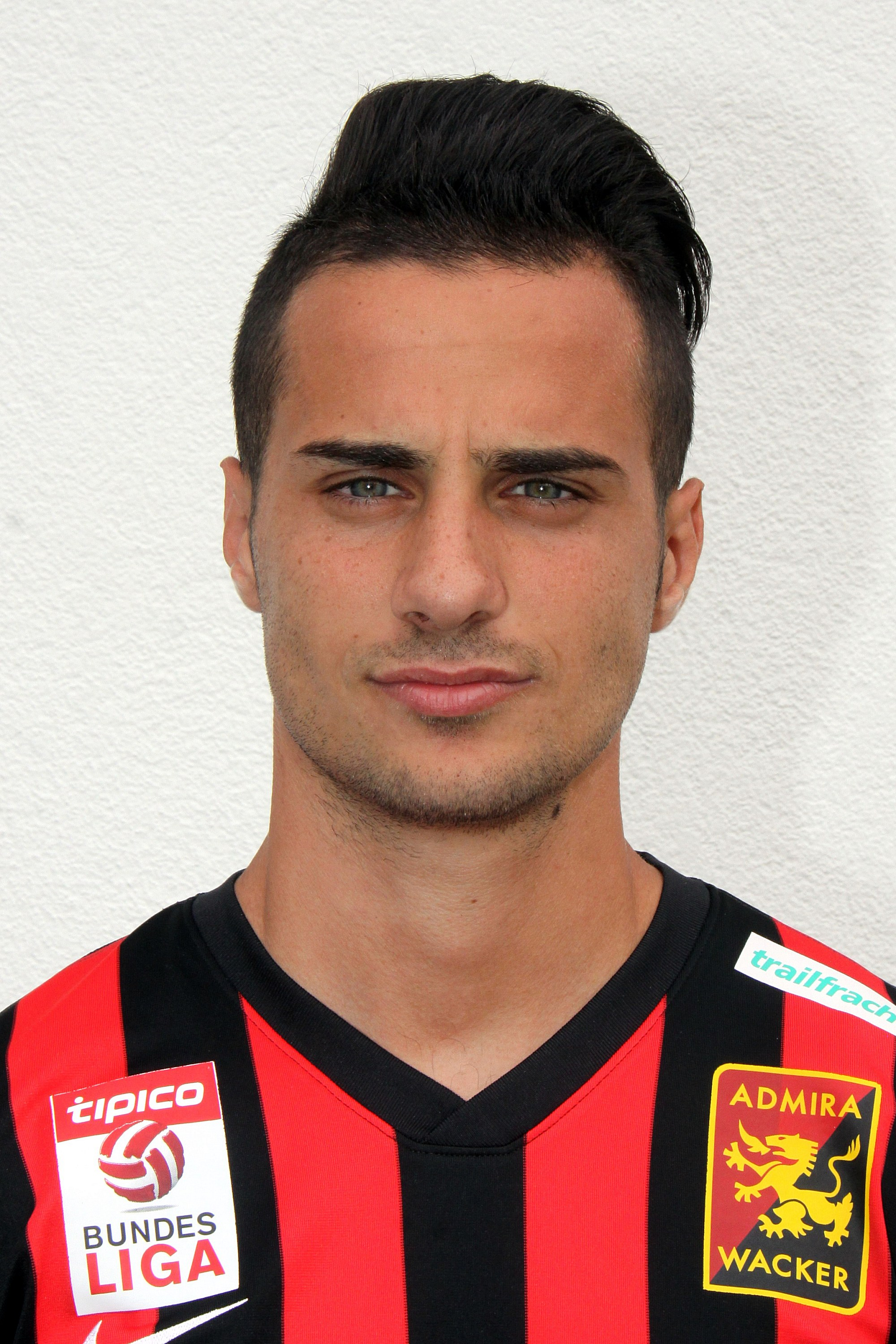

Personal information
- Full name: Eldis Bajrami
- Date of birth: 12 December 1992 (age 33)
- Place of birth: Vienna, Austria
- Height: 1.72 m (5 ft 8 in)
- Positions: Right midfielder; left midfielder

Team information
- Current team: FC Marchfeld Donauauen
- Number: 7

Senior career*
Years	Team	Apps	(Gls)
2010–2015	Rapid Wien II	84	(15)
2013–2015	Rapid Wien	2	(0)
2014–2015	→ Admira Wacker (loan)	31	(3)
2015–2017	Admira Wacker	51	(1)
2017–2019	St. Pölten	29	(1)
2020–2022	FCM Traiskirchen	34	(4)
2022–	FC Marchfeld Donauauen	113	(8)

International career
2012–2013	Macedonia U-21	4	(0)
- * Club domestic league appearances and goals as of 24 June 2026

Eldis Bajrami (born 12 December 1992) is a Macedonian-Albanian footballer who plays as a midfielder for FC Marchfeld Donauauen.

== Club career ==
He was loaned out to Admira Wacker Mödling on 5 June 2014, after making 31 appearances and scoring 3 goals during that loan spell he joined Admira permanently on 28 April 2015 for an undisclosed fee.

== International career ==
Despite born in Austria, he made his international debut for the Macedonian U-21 national team.
