= Lukas Stadler =

Austrian footballer

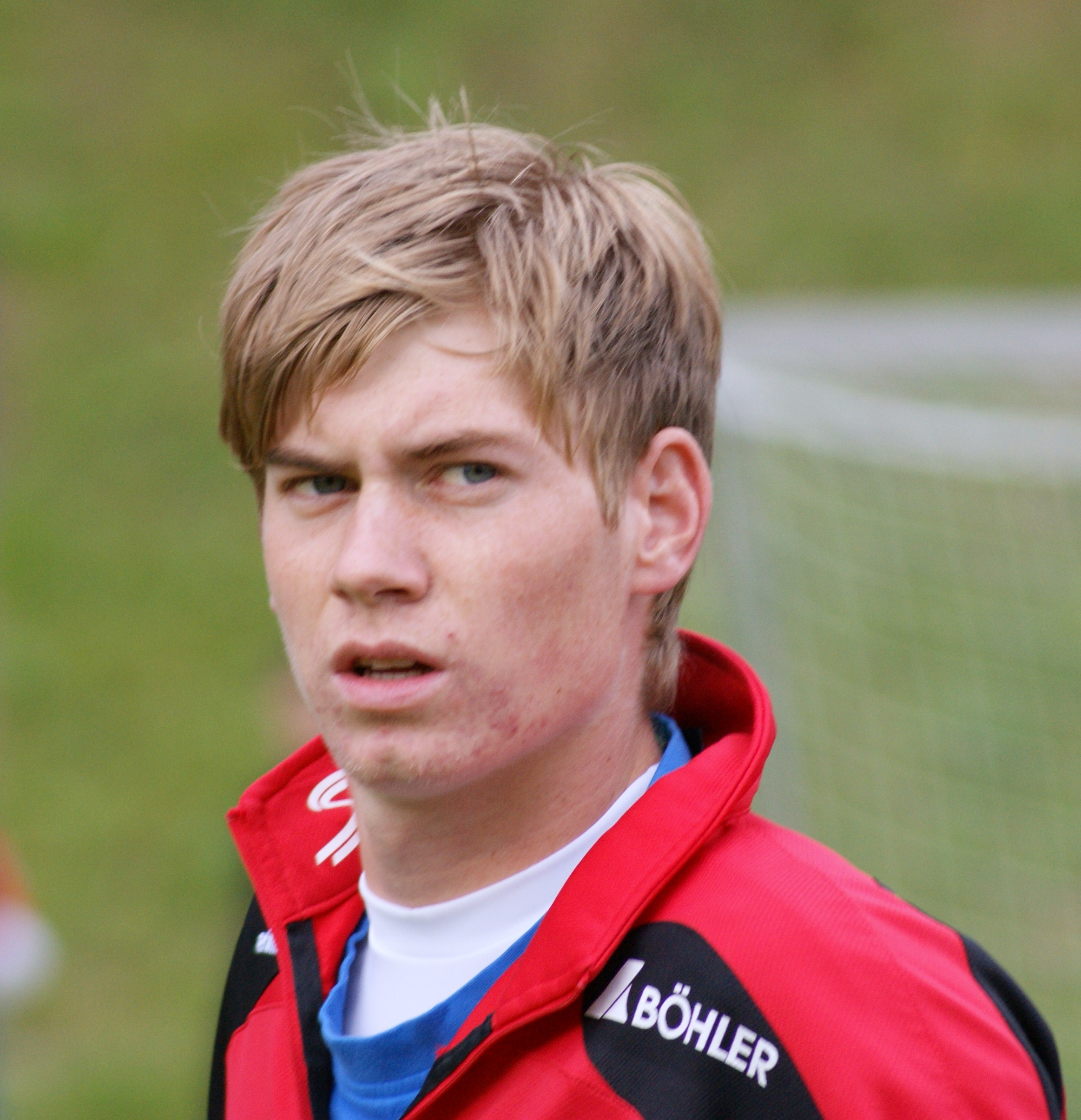

Personal information
- Full name: Lukas Stadler
- Date of birth: 28 October 1990 (age 36)
- Place of birth: Bruck an der Mur, Austria
- Position: Defender

Team information
- Current team: Grazer AK
- Number: 17

Senior career*
Years	Team	Apps	(Gls)
2010–	Kapfenberger SV	10	(0)
2012–	→ Grazer AK (loan)		
- * Club domestic league appearances and goals as of 14:43, 2 August 2012 (UTC)

Lukas Stadler (born 28 October 1990) is an Austrian footballer.
