= Patrick Wessely =

Austrian footballer (born 1994)

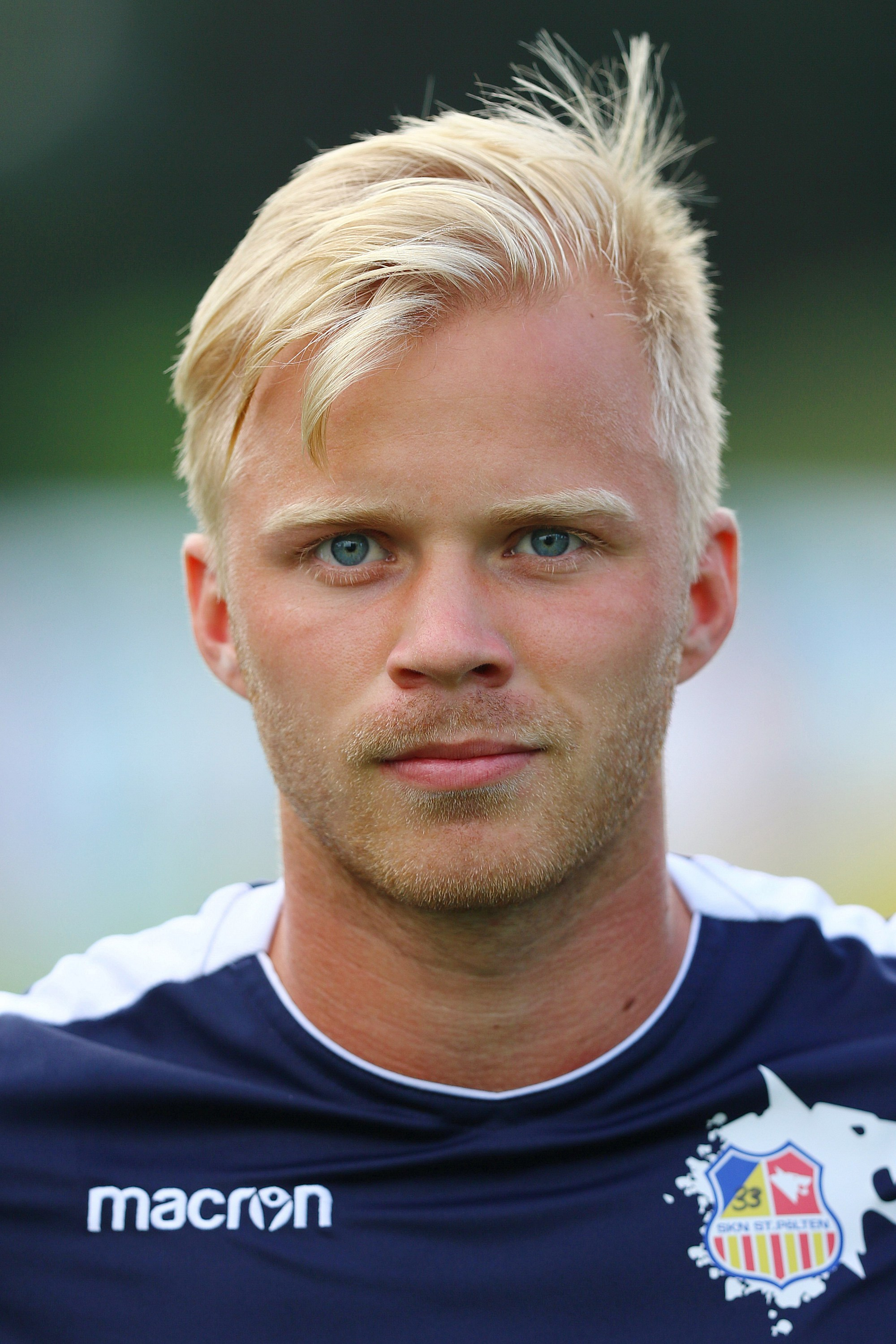

Personal information
- Full name: Patrick Wessely
- Date of birth: 27 March 1994 (age 32)
- Place of birth: Vienna, Austria
- Height: 1.72 m (5 ft 8 in)
- Position: Defender

Team information
- Current team: Wiener Viktoria

Youth career
- –2004: SV Langenzersdorf
- 2004–2008: Floridsdorfer AC
- 2008–2011: Admira Wacker

Senior career*
Years	Team	Apps	(Gls)
2011–2017	Admira Wacker	40	(0)
2011–2016	→ Admira Wacker ΙΙ	69	(1)
2017	Septemvri Sofia	4	(0)
2018	St. Pölten	6	(0)
2019	Neman Grodno	6	(0)
2020–2021	Xylotymbou	30	(1)
2022–2023	SV Stripfing	12	(1)
2023–	SC Wiener Viktoria	24	(0)

International career
2012–2013	Austria U19	8	(1)
2014–2016	Austria U21	3	(0)
- * Club domestic league appearances and goals as of 31 May 2024

Patrick Wessely (born 27 March 1994) is an Austrian footballer who plays for Wiener Viktoria.

== Career ==
=== Admira Wacker ===
Wessely started his career at Admira Wacker and made his professional debut on 3 August 2013 in a 7–1 defeat against SV Grödig. On 24 April 2017 the club announced that his contract won't be continued and in the summer of 2017 Wessely left the club alongside his teammate Toni Vastić.

=== Septemvri Sofia ===
On 20 October 2017 he signed a 2 years contract with the Bulgarian First League team of Septemvri Sofia. He made his official debut for the club on 26 October 2017 in a cup match against Etar Veliko Tarnovo in which Septemvri was eliminated. He completed his debut in the league on 6 November in a 1:0 home win against Pirin Blagoevgrad.

== Club statistics ==
As of 21 December 2017

Club performance			League		Cup		Continental		Other		Total	
Club	League	Season	Apps	Goals	Apps	Goals	Apps	Goals	Apps	Goals	Apps	Goals
Austria			League		ÖFB Cup		Europe		Other		Total	
Admira Wacker II	Regionalliga											
Admira Wacker II	Regionalliga	2011–12	15	0	–		–		–		15	0
Admira Wacker II	Regionalliga	2012–13	28	1	–		–		–		28	1
Admira Wacker II	Regionalliga	2013–14	11	0	–		–		–		11	0
Admira Wacker II	Regionalliga	2014–15	8	0	–		–		–		8	0
Admira Wacker II	Regionalliga	2015–16	3	0	–		–		–		3	0
Admira Wacker II	Regionalliga	2016–17	4	0	–		–		–		4	0
Admira Wacker II	Total		69	1	0	0	0	0	0	0	69	1
Admira Wacker	Bundesliga											
Admira Wacker	Bundesliga	2013–14	8	0	1	0	–		–		9	0
Admira Wacker	Bundesliga	2014–15	11	0	2	0	–		–		13	0
Admira Wacker	Bundesliga	2015–16	13	0	5	0	–		–		18	0
Admira Wacker	Bundesliga	2016–17	8	0	2	0	0	0	–		10	0
Admira Wacker	Total		40	0	10	0	0	0	0	0	50	0
Bulgaria			League		Bulgarian Cup		Europe		Other		Total	
Septemvri Sofia	First League	2017–18	4	0	1	0	–		–		5	0
Septemvri Sofia	Total		4	0	1	0	0	0	0	0	5	0
Career statistics			113	1	11	0	0	0	0	0	124	1
