= Miroslav Milošević (footballer, born 1985) =

Austrian footballer

Miroslav Milosevic
Personal information
- Date of birth: September 18, 1985 (age 41)
- Height: 1.86 m (6 ft 1 in)
- Position: Defender

Senior career*
Years	Team	Apps	(Gls)
1998–2001	SV Grödig		
2001–2005	SV Austria Salzburg	106	(4)
2005	Red Bull Juniors	3	(0)
2006	SV Seekirchen	12	(2)
2006–2009	Kapfenberger SV	46	(1)
2009	SV Grödig	9	(0)
- * Club domestic league appearances and goals as of August 23, 2010 ‡ National team caps and goals as of February 5, 2010

Miroslav Milosevic (born September 18, 1985) is an Austrian football defender who last plays for SV Grödig.
