= Roman Kienast =

Austrian footballer

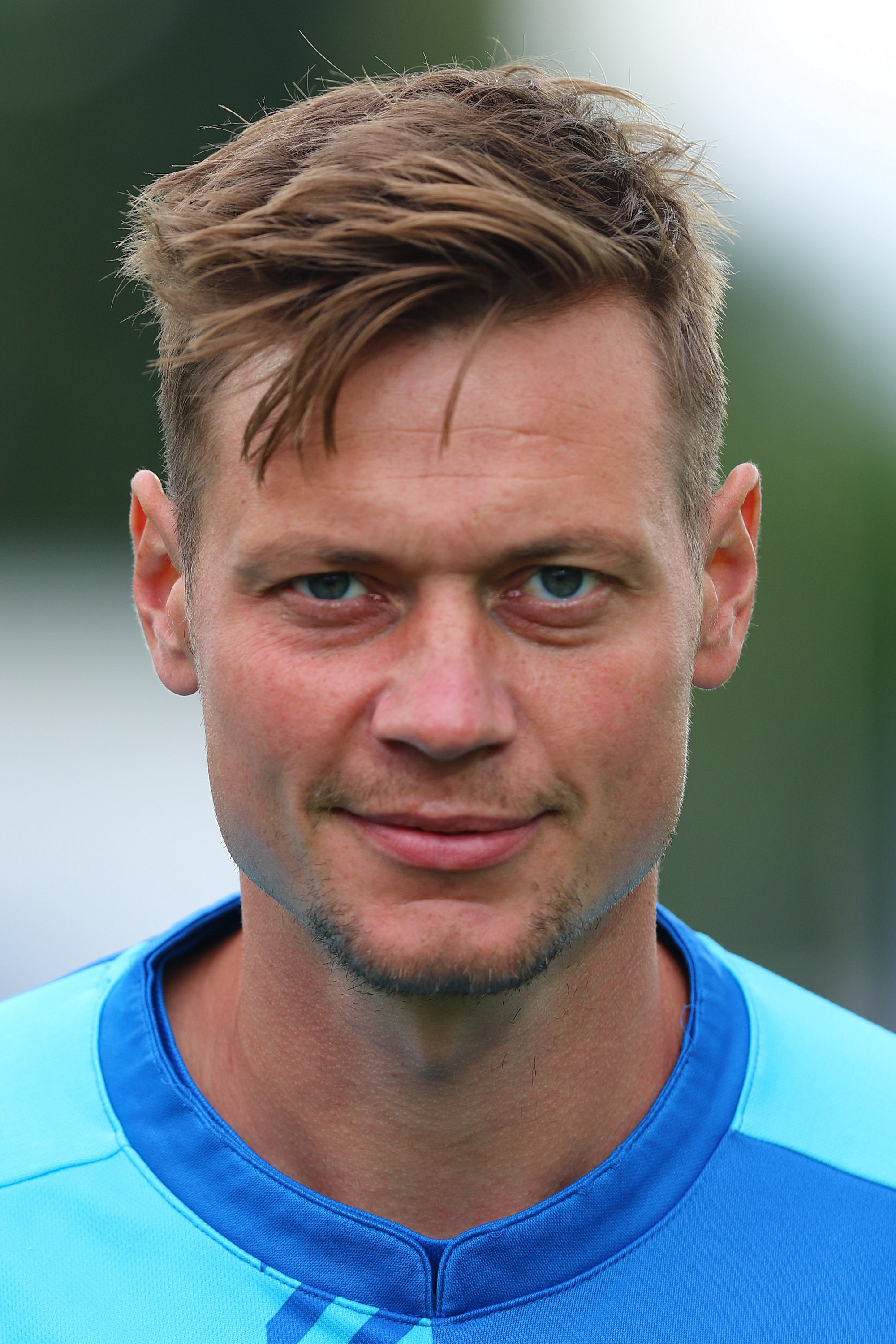
- Kienast with Wiener Neustadt in 2018

Personal information
- Date of birth: 29 March 1984 (age 42)
- Place of birth: Salzburg, Austria
- Height: 1.90 m (6 ft 3 in)
- Position: Forward

Team information
- Current team: Lockenhaus (player); First Vienna (U-18 manager)

Senior career*
Years	Team	Apps	(Gls)
2001–2004	Rapid Wien Amateure	13	(11)
2002–2006	Rapid Wien	55	(12)
2004–2005	→ SC Rheindorf Altach (loan)	6	(4)
2006–2009	Ham-Kam	85	(27)
2008	→ Helsingborgs IF (loan)	12	(3)
2010–2012	Sturm Graz	48	(24)
2012–2015	Austria Wien	63	(14)
2015–2017	Sturm Graz	48	(15)
2017–2018	FC Wil	7	(2)
2018–2019	Wiener Neustadt	23	(3)
2019–2020	Stripfing	13	(2)
2021–	Lockenhaus		

International career
2006–2007	Austria U-21	24	(7)
2007–2011	Austria	11	(1)

Managerial career
- 2019–2020: SV Stripfing (player-assistant)
- 2021–: First Vienna (U-18 manager)
- * Club domestic league appearances and goals

Roman Kienast (born 29 March 1984) is an Austrian professional footballer who plays as a striker for SC Lockenhaus-Rattersdorf. He is currently also the manager of First Vienna's U-18 squad.

== Club career ==
Kienast joined the youth team of Rapid Wien at the age of 14. He debuted in the club's first team in 2002. In the next two seasons, he made 24 appearances in the Austrian Bundesliga, but was unable to score a goal. In 2004, he was loaned out to SC Rheindorf Altach, then playing in the Austrian Football First League (Austria's second highest professional league). After scoring four goals in six games, he was quickly called back by Rapid. During the rest of the season, he made 21 appearances for the Vienna side, and finally managed to score his first goal in the Bundesliga. The season ended in glory for the team as they won the Austrian title.

Just before the start of the 2006 season, Kienast came to the Norwegian club Hamarkameratene (Ham-Kam) on loan. He played well during the first spring games, and Ham-Kam decided to buy him. However, he could not prevent the team from going down that season. In the next season, Ham-Kam got promoted back to the Norwegian Premier League, with Kienast playing an integral part in the campaign by scoring 14 goals.

As of 27 May 2008, Kienast has not scored during the 2008 season in Ham-Kam's comeback to the top flight.

On 31 July 2008, Kienast moved to Helsingborgs IF of Allsvenskan in Sweden on loan for the rest of the year with an option for them to buy the player. On 26 November 2013, Kienast scored the first UEFA Champions League group stage goal in Austria Vienna's history, netting in the 1–1 away draw with FC Porto.

After three years with Austria Wien, he returned to Sturm Graz in January 2015.

=== Later career ===
In July 2019, Kienast joined SV Stripfing as a playing assistant manager. He left the club again in the summer 2020.

On 10 February 2021, Kienast joined SC Lockenhaus-Rattersdorf. Beside that, Kienast was also appointed manager of First Vienna FC's U-18 squad on 14 June 2021.

== International career ==
Kienast made 11 appearances for the Austria national team. He scored one goal on 27 May in a 1–0 goal win Nigeria in a friendly. After that game, coach Josef Hickersberger chose him in the final squad for the European Championship.

== Personal life ==
Roman is the son of former Rapid Wien player Wolfgang Kienast and the nephew of former Austria international Reinhard Kienast.

== Honours ==
Rapid Wien

- Austrian Bundesliga: 2004–05

Sturm Graz

- Austrian Bundesliga: 2010–11
