= Mattias Sereinig =

Austrian footballer

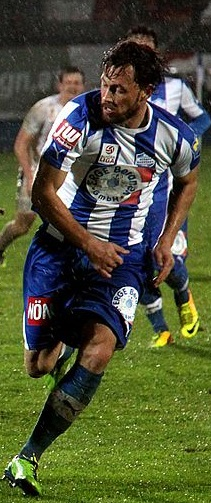
- Mattias Sereinig, 23 November 2013

Personal information
- Date of birth: 17 November 1984 (age 41)
- Place of birth: Klagenfurt, Austria
- Height: 1.91 m (6 ft 3 in)
- Position: Midfielder

Team information
- Current team: Austria Klagenfurt
- Number: 33

Senior career*
Years	Team	Apps	(Gls)
2003–2008	FC Kelag Karnten	94	(1)
2004	BSV Juniors (loan)	2	(0)
2008–2009	Sturm Graz	8	(0)
2009–2013	SCR Altach	117	(3)
2013–2015	Wiener Neustadt	48	(1)
2015–	Austria Klagenfurt	25	(0)
- * Club domestic league appearances and goals as of 31 May 2016

Mattias Sereinig (born 17 November 1984) is an Austrian football midfielder who plays for SC Wiener Neustadt. He previously played for SK Sturm Graz, SC Rheindorf Altach and SC Wiener Neustadt.
