= René Schicker =

Austrian footballer

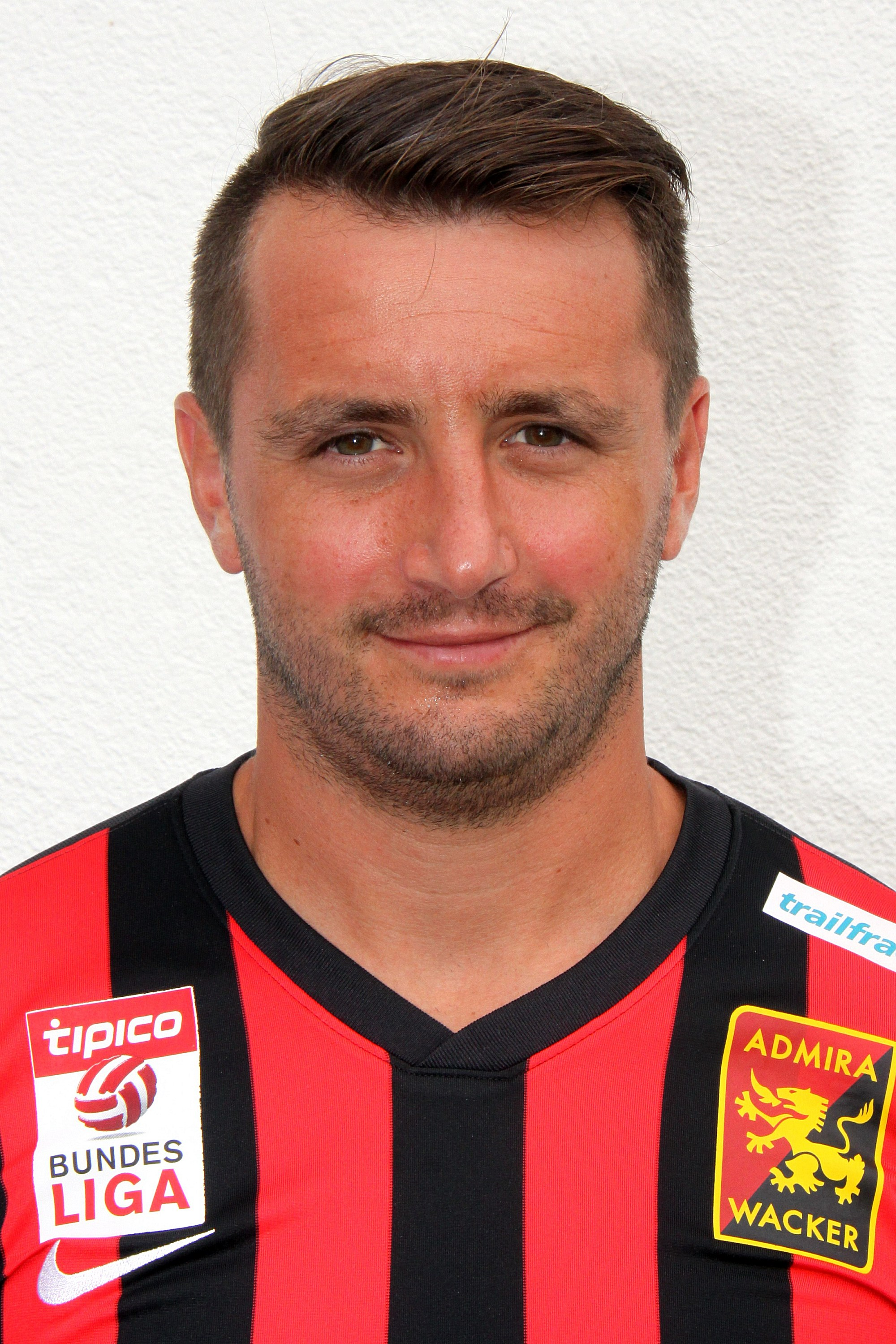

Personal information
- Full name: René Schicker
- Date of birth: 28 September 1984 (age 42)
- Place of birth: Leoben, Austria
- Height: 1.71 m (5 ft 7 1/2 in)
- Positions: Forward; midfielder

Team information
- Current team: USV Hof bei Straden (player-coach)
- Number: 17

Youth career
- 2001–2002: Grazer AK

Senior career*
Years	Team	Apps	(Gls)
2002–2003	DSV Leoben	33	(7)
2003–2004	SV Salzburg	4	(0)
2004	→ Kapfenberg (loan)	14	(2)
2004–2006	St. Gallen	16	(2)
2005–2006	→ Kärnten (loan)	32	(7)
2006–2008	DSV Leoben	55	(13)
2008–2016	Admira Wacker	187	(42)
2013	→ Hartberg (loan)	16	(3)
2016–2017	SV Stripfing	12	(4)
2017–2018	SC Wiener Viktoria	41	(18)
2019–	USV Hof bei Straden	20	(4)

International career
2002–2003	Austria U-19	20	(8)
2003–2005	Austria U-21	20	(9)

Managerial career
- 2016–2017: Admira Wacker II (assistant)
- 2019–: USV Hof bei Straden (player-coach)
- * Club domestic league appearances and goals as of 16:58, 17 January 2021 (UTC)

René Schicker (born 28 September 1984) is an Austrian footballer who currently it the head coach and player of USV Hof bei Straden.

== Later and coaching career ==
In June 2016, Schicker was appointed assistant coach of Admira Wacker's B-team. At the time, he was also playing for SV Stripfing in the 1. NÖN-Landesliga.

In the summer 2017, he moved to SC Wiener Viktoria. In January 2019, Schicker was appointed player-head coach of USV Hof bei Straden. During 2020, Schicker also helped coaching the U10 and U11s at DSV Leoben.

== Club statistics ==
Club	Season	League		Cup		League Cup		Europe		Total	
Club	Season	Apps	Goals	Apps	Goals	Apps	Goals	Apps	Goals	Apps	Goals
Leoben
Leoben	2001–02	12	2	1	1	0	0	0	0	13	3
Leoben	2002–03	21	5	0	0	0	0	0	0	21	5
Leoben	2006–07	25	5	0	0	0	0	0	0	25	5
Leoben	2007–08	30	8	0	0	0	0	0	0	30	8
Leoben	Total	88	20	1	1	0	0	0	0	89	21
Salzburg
Salzburg	2003–04	4	0	0	0	0	0	0	0	4	0
Salzburg	Total	4	0	0	0	0	0	0	0	4	0
Kapfenberg
Kapfenberg	2003–04	14	2	0	0	0	0	0	0	14	2
Kapfenberg	Total	14	2	0	0	0	0	0	0	14	2
St. Gallen
St. Gallen	2004–05	16	2	3	0	0	0	0	0	19	2
St. Gallen	Total	16	2	3	0	0	0	0	0	19	2
Kärnten
Kärnten	2005–06	32	7	0	0	0	0	0	0	32	7
Kärnten	Total	32	7	0	0	0	0	0	0	32	7
Admira Wacker
Admira Wacker	2008–09	32	7	6	1	0	0	0	0	38	8
Admira Wacker	2009–10	32	5	2	0	0	0	0	0	37	5
Admira Wacker	2010–11	31	8	1	0	0	0	0	0	32	8
Admira Wacker	2011–12	13	2	3	1	0	0	0	0	16	3
Admira Wacker	2012–13	9	3	1	0	0	0	0	0	10	3
Admira Wacker	2013–14	30	11	3	0	0	0	0	0	33	11
Admira Wacker	2014–15	24	5	2	0	0	0	0	0	26	5
Admira Wacker	2015–16	16	1	2	0	0	0	0	0	18	1
Admira Wacker	Total	187	42	20	2	0	0	0	0	207	44
Hartberg (loan)
Hartberg (loan)	2012–13	16	3	0	0	0	0	0	0	16	3
Hartberg (loan)	Total	16	3	0	0	0	0	0	0	16	3
Career Total		317	70	20	3	0	0	0	0	337	73

Updated to games played as of 6 July 2016.
