= Furkan Aydogdu =

Turkish-Austrian footballer (born 1988)

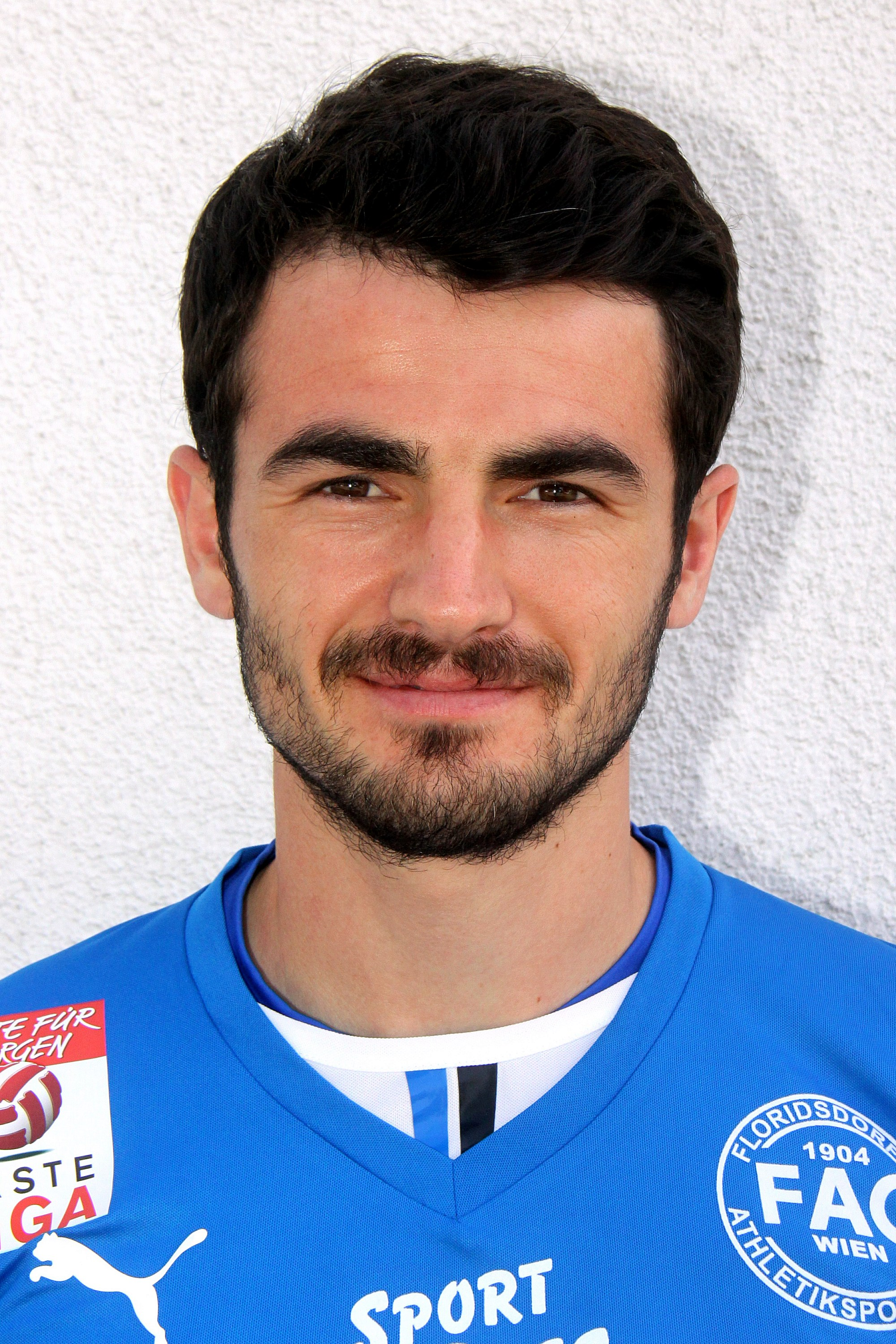
- Aydogdu for Floridsdorfer AC in 2014

Personal information
- Date of birth: 6 June 1988 (age 38)
- Place of birth: Terme, Turkey
- Height: 1.75 m (5 ft 9 in)
- Position: Attacking midfielder

Team information
- Current team: FC Eintracht Wien

Youth career
- 1996–2000: FS Elektra
- 2000–2005: First Vienna

Senior career*
Years	Team	Apps	(Gls)
2005	FS Elektra		
2005–2006	SV Donau	14	(1)
2006–2008	SR Donaufeld	43	(17)
2008	SV Schwechat	13	(4)
2008–2011	SC/ESV Parndorf	79	(7)
2011–2012	Austria Wien II	20	(6)
2012–2013	FC Lustenau 07	34	(10)
2013–2014	SV Ried	11	(1)
2014	TSV Hartberg	16	(0)
2014–2016	Floridsdorfer AC	58	(9)
2016	Sarıyer	4	(0)
2017–2018	Mauerwerk	21	(3)
2018	FV Wien Floridsdorf	10	(3)
2019	TSU Obergänserndorf	12	(4)
2019–2020	Team Wiener Linien	9	(1)
2020–2022	SC Ostbahn XI	37	(10)
2022–2023	SK Wullersdorf		
2023–	FC Eintracht Wien	0	(0)
- * Club domestic league appearances and goals as of 20:34, 7 March 2023 (UTC)

Furkan Aydogdu (born 6 June 1988) is a Turkish-Austrian footballer who plays as an attacking midfielder for FC Eintracht Wien.
