= Christian Ramsebner =

Austrian footballer (born 1989)

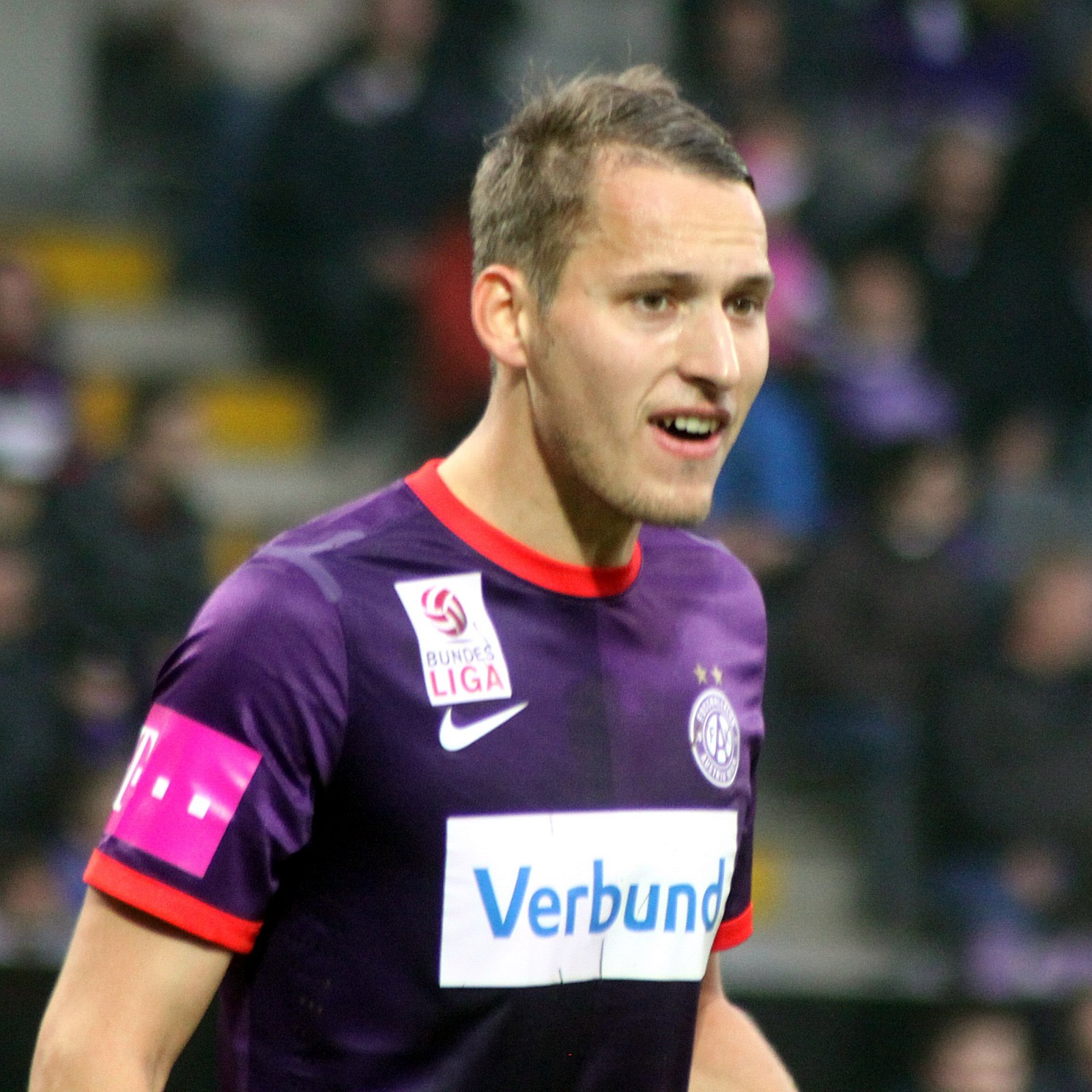

Personal information
- Date of birth: 26 March 1989 (age 37)
- Place of birth: Kirchdorf an der Krems, Austria
- Height: 1.89 m (6 ft 2 1/2 in)
- Position: Centre-back

Team information
- Current team: SV Stripfing
- Number: 15

Youth career
- 2006–2009: Austria Wien Amateure

Senior career*
Years	Team	Apps	(Gls)
2006–2009	Austria Wien Amateure	89	(3)
2009–2013	SC Wiener Neustadt	85	(3)
2013–2015	Austria Wien	10	(4)
2015–2021	LASK	130	(5)
2021–2024	SKN St. Pölten	63	(1)
2024–	SV Stripfing	23	(0)

International career
2008–2010	Austria U21	12	(0)
- * Club domestic league appearances and goals as of 12 June 2025

Christian Ramsebner (born 26 March 1989) is an Austrian professional footballer who plays as a centre-back for 2. Liga club SV Stripfing.

== Club career ==
On 25 June 2021, he signed a two-year contract with SKN St. Pölten. On 27 February 2023, Ramsebner, who in the meantime had been named team captain, extended his contract with the club until 2024.

On 31 May 2024, Ramsebner moved to SV Stripfing.
