= Thomas Salamon =

Austrian footballer

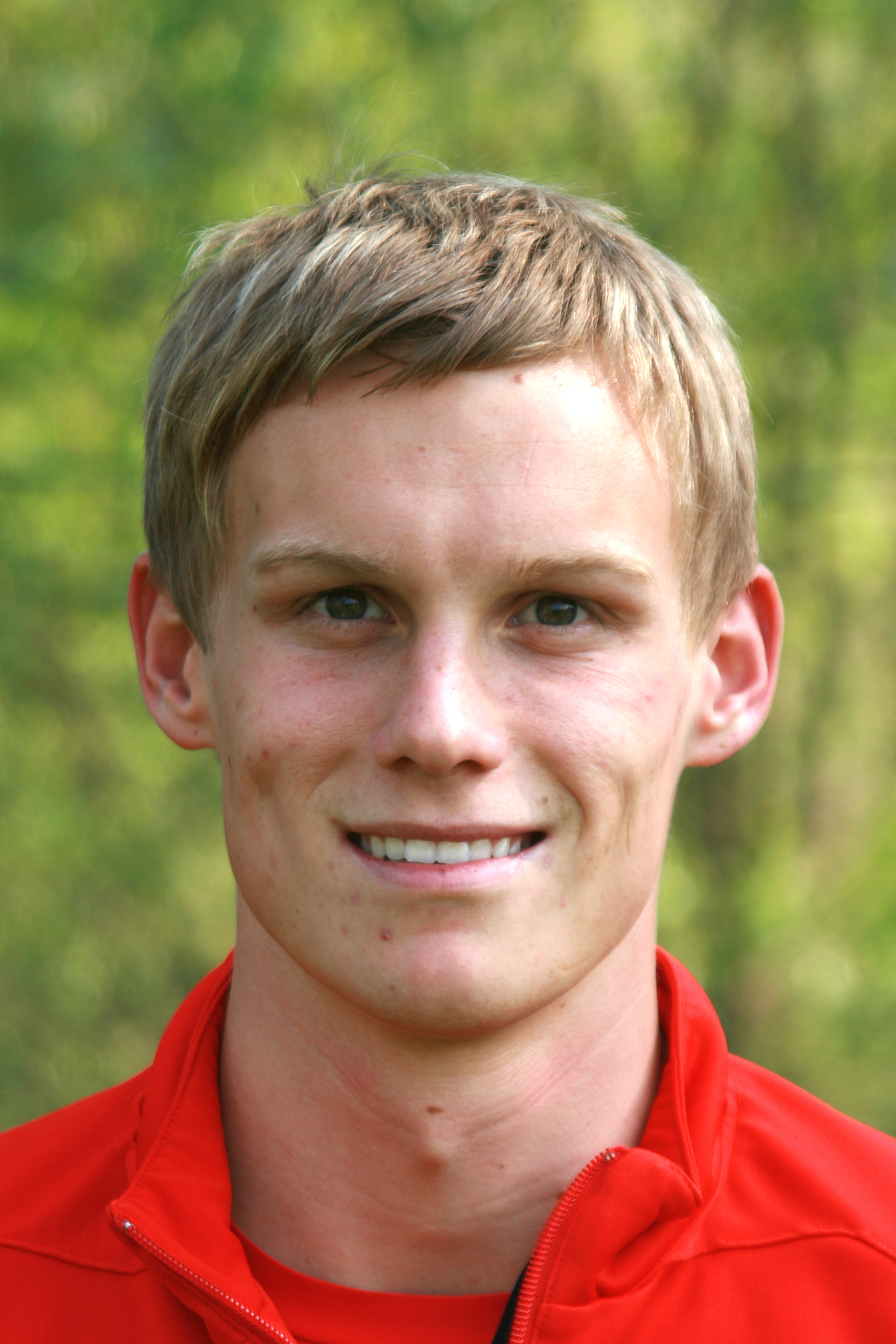
- Thomas Salamon (2009)

Personal information
- Date of birth: 18 January 1989 (age 37)
- Place of birth: Mattersburg, Austria
- Height: 1.75 m (5 ft 9 in)
- Position: Midfielder

Team information
- Current team: Young Violets
- Number: 25

Youth career
- 1996–2002: SV Edelpute
- 2002–2003: AKA Burgenland
- 2003–2008: Austria Wien

Senior career*
Years	Team	Apps	(Gls)
2007–2008	Austria Wien Amateure	16	(1)
2008–2012	Mattersburg	51	(2)
2011–2012	→ Grödig (loan)	34	(2)
2012–2014	Grödig	52	(15)
2014–2019	Austria Wien	82	(2)
2019–2020	SV Horn	13	(0)
2020–2021	Sūduva	18	(2)
2021–2024	St. Pölten	54	(2)
2024–	Young Violets	24	(0)

International career
2007–2008	Austria U-19	3	(0)
2008–2009	Austria U-20	6	(0)

Managerial career
- 2023: Burgenland Academy (assistant)
- 2023: SV Forchtenstein (academy)
- 2023–2024: Burgenland Academy (individual coach)
- 2024–: Austria Wien (U16 assistant)
- * Club domestic league appearances and goals as of 17 May 2026

Thomas Salamon (born 18 January 1989) is an Austrian professional association football coach and player. He works as an assistant coach for the Under-16 squad of Austria Wien and also plays for the club's reserve team Young Violets in Austrian Regionalliga.

== Club career ==
In Austria he played for Austria Wien Amateure, Mattersburg, Grödig, Austria Wien and SV Horn.

On 31 January 2020 he became a member of Lithuanian FK Sūduva Marijampolė. In 2020 A lyga he played 18 matches and scored two goals and made one assist.

He did not play in the first half 2021, because of an injury. On 16 June 2021 he left FK Sūduva.

On 17 June 2021 he returned to Austria and signed a one-year contract with St. Pölten.

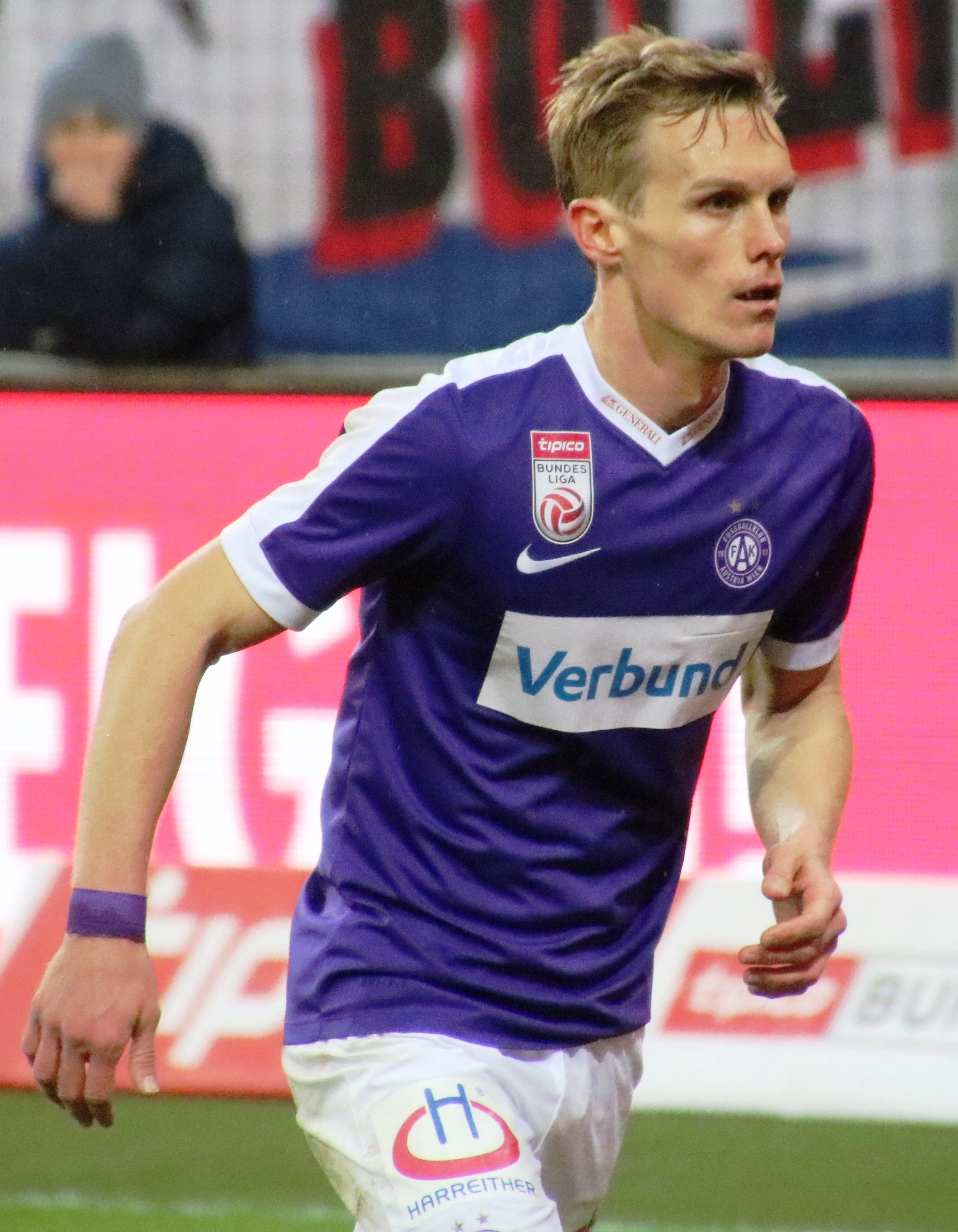
Thomas Salamon (2017)
