= Sašo Fornezzi =

Slovenian footballer (born 1982)

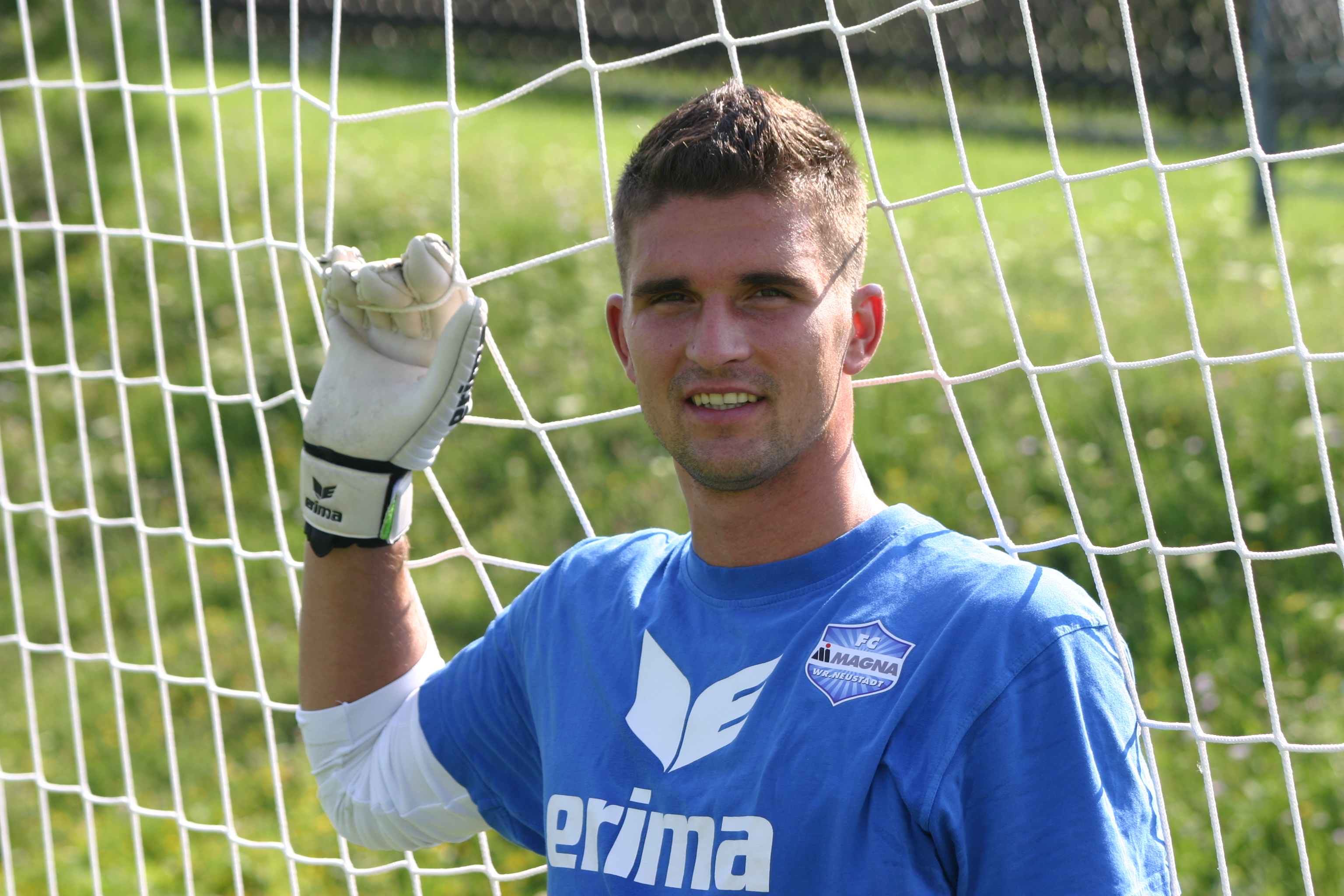
- Fornezzi with Wiener Neustadt

Personal information
- Date of birth: 11 December 1982 (age 43)
- Place of birth: Slovenj Gradec, SFR Yugoslavia
- Height: 1.91 m (6 ft 3 in)
- Position: Goalkeeper

Youth career
- –2001: Dravograd

Senior career*
Years	Team	Apps	(Gls)
2000–2001	Dravograd	13	(0)
2001–2004	Celje	22	(0)
2002	→ Mons Claudius (loan)	7	(1)
2002–2004	→ Krško (loan)	23	(4)
2004–2006	Kapfenberger SV	33	(0)
2006–2007	Grazer AK	10	(0)
2007–2008	Austria Wien	13	(0)
2008–2011	Wiener Neustadt	94	(0)
2011–2013	Orduspor	55	(0)
2013–2018	Antalyaspor	73	(0)
Total		343	(5)

International career
2002–2003	Slovenia U20	4	(0)
2002–2003	Slovenia U21	9	(0)
- * Club domestic league appearances and goals

Sašo Fornezzi (born 11 December 1982) is a Slovenian retired football goalkeeper.

== Club career ==
Fornezzi started his career at Dravograd and then played three seasons for Celje. He was also loaned to Krško in the Slovenian Second League before moving to Austrian side Kapfenberger SV in 2004. Two years later he joined Grazer AK but left them in 2007 for Austria Wien after their demotion due to financial difficulties.

Fornezzi then left Austria Wien for the newly formed Austrian second-division side FC Magna Wiener Neustadt.
