= 2015 UEFA European Under-21 Championship qualification Group 1 =

International football competition

The teams competing in Group 1 of the 2015 UEFA European Under-21 Championships qualifying competition were England, Finland, Lithuania, Moldova, San Marino and Wales.

The ten group winners and the four best second-placed teams advanced to the play-offs.

== Standings ==
Pos	Team	Pld	W	D	L	GF	GA	GD	Pts	Qualification	England	Finland	Moldova	Wales	Lithuania	San Marino
1	England	10	9	1	0	31	2	+29	28	Play-offs	—	3–0	1–0	1–0	5–0	9–0
2	Finland	10	4	4	2	17	10	+7	16		1–1	—	1–0	2–2	2–2	5–0
3	Moldova	10	5	1	4	12	6	+6	16		0–3	1–0	—	0–0	3–0	2–0
4	Wales	10	3	3	4	12	13	−1	12		1–3	1–5	1–0	—	2–0	4–0
5	Lithuania	10	2	2	6	6	19	−13	8		0–1	0–1	0–3	1–1	—	2–1
6	San Marino	10	1	1	8	2	30	−28	4		0–4	0–0	0–3	1–0	0–1	—

Source: UEFA
Rules for classification: Tiebreakers

== Results and fixtures ==
All times are CEST (UTC+02:00) during summer and CET (UTC+01:00) during winter.

22 March 2013
19:00

Wales	1–0	Moldova
Lawrence 10'	Report

Parc y Scarlets, Llanelli
Referee: Gunnar Jarl Jónsson (Iceland)

6 June 2013
16:00

Lithuania	2–1	San Marino
Verbickas 8'; Spalvis 83'	Report	Biordi 13'

ARVI Football Arena, Marijampolė
Referee: Sven Bindels (Luxembourg)

11 June 2013
16:00

Finland	2–2	Lithuania
Pohjanpalo 14'; P. O'Shaughnessy 90'	Report	Spalvis 53', 70'

Raatin Stadion, Oulu
Referee: Georgi Vadachkoria (Georgia)
11 June 2013
20:30

San Marino	0–3	Moldova
	Report	Dima 21'; Anton 30' (pen.); Milinceanu 83'

Stadio Olimpico, Serravalle
Referee: Suren Baliyan (Armenia)

14 August 2013
17:00

Wales	1–5	Finland
Huws 47' (pen.)	Report	Kastrati 7'; Väyrynen 11', 30', 57'; Yaghoubi 39'

Nantporth, Bangor
Referee: Hugo Miguel (Portugal)
14 August 2013
21:00

San Marino	0–1	Lithuania
	Report	Kazlauskas 49'

Stadio Olimpico, Serravalle
Referee: Kevin Azzopardi (Malta)

5 September 2013
18:00

Lithuania	0–1	Finland
	Report	Väyrynen 53'

LFF Stadium, Vilnius
Referee: Ádám Németh (Hungary)
5 September 2013
19:45

England	1–0	Moldova
Berahino 13'	Report

Madejski Stadium, Reading
Attendance: 5,268
Referee: Nikola Dabanović (Montenegro)
6 September 2013
20:30

San Marino	1–0	Wales
Biordi 22'	Report

Stadio Olimpico, Serravalle
Referee: Dejan Jakimovski (Macedonia)

9 September 2013
18:00

Finland	1–1	England
Yaghoubi 15'	Report	Berahino 67'

Tampere Stadium, Tampere
Attendance: 4,459
Referee: Vladimir Kazmenko (Russia)
10 September 2013
18:00

Moldova	0–0	Wales
	Report

Sheriff Stadium, Tiraspol
Referee: Rahim Hasanov (Azerbaijan)

10 October 2013
20:30

San Marino	0–4	England
	Report	Keane 5'; Kane 45+3' (pen.), 65', 89'

Stadio Olimpico, Serravalle
Attendance: 245
Referee: Eiko Saar (Estonia)
11 October 2013
15:00

Wales	2–0	Lithuania
Lawrence 21' (pen.), 40' (pen.)	Report

Nantporth, Bangor
Referee: Ioannis Anastasiou (Cyprus)

15 October 2013
15:00

Wales	4–0	San Marino
Harrison 44'; Lucas 50'; Burns 64'; Bodin 84'	Report

Nantporth, Bangor
Referee: Denis Scherbakov (Belarus)
15 October 2013
18:00

Moldova	1–0	Finland
Bogdan 68'	Report

Sheriff Stadium, Tiraspol
Referee: Wim Smet (Belgium)
15 October 2013
19:00

England	5–0	Lithuania
Morrison 3', 71'; Ward-Prowse 27'; Berahino 63', 76' (pen.)	Report

Portman Road, Ipswich
Attendance: 17,069
Referee: Adrien Jaccottet (Switzerland)

14 November 2013
20:45

England	3–0	Finland
Keane 21'; Berahino 37', 90+1'	Report

Stadium mk, Milton Keynes
Attendance: 19,807
Referee: Paolo Valeri (Italy)
15 November 2013
18:00

Moldova	2–0	San Marino
Dima 53'; Ursu 82'	Report

Sheriff Stadium, Tiraspol
Referee: Ádám Németh (Hungary)

19 November 2013
18:00

Moldova	3–0	Lithuania
Dima 37'; Milinceanu 54', 81'	Report

Sheriff Stadium, Tiraspol
Referee: Dimitar Meckarovski (Macedonia)
19 November 2013
19:00

England	9–0	San Marino
Keane 13'; Sterling 15', 59'; Ings 18', 48'; Ward-Prowse 24'; Ince 42'; Jenkinson 61'; Hughes 78'	Report

New Meadow, Shrewsbury
Attendance: 9,264
Referee: Gunnar Jarl Jónsson (Iceland)

5 March 2014
19:00

England	1–0	Wales
Redmond 56'	Report

Pride Park Stadium, Derby
Attendance: 13,438
Referee: Nicolas Rainville (France)
5 March 2014
20:30

San Marino	0–0	Finland
	Report

Stadio Olimpico, Serravalle
Referee: Michael Johansen (Denmark)

19 May 2014
20:30

Wales	1–3	England
Edwards 20'	Report	Redmond 18', 38'; Berahino 90+2'

Liberty Stadium, Swansea
Attendance: 2,800
Referee: Artyom Kuchin (Kazakhstan)

1 June 2014
17:30

Finland	1–0	Moldova
Hatakka 55'	Report

Kymenlaakson Sähkö Stadion, Kouvola
Referee: Vadims Direktorenko (Latvia)

5 June 2014
17:30

Lithuania	0–3	Moldova
	Report	Milinceanu 31'; Dima 69', 85'

LFF Stadium, Vilnius
Referee: Tornike Gvantseladze (Georgia)

5 September 2014
18:00

Lithuania	0–1	England
	Report	Kane 81'

Darius and Girėnas Stadium, Kaunas
Attendance: 3,500
Referee: Vlado Glođović (Serbia)
5 September 2014
18:00

Finland	2–2	Wales
Lod 19'; Väyrynen 87'	Report	Burns 65'; Evans 69'

Veritas Stadion, Turku
Referee: Andreas Pappas (Greece)

9 September 2014
18:00

Lithuania	1–1	Wales
Tamulevičius 81'	Report	Evans 90'

Alytus Stadium, Alytus
Referee: Ivaylo Stoyanov (Bulgaria)
9 September 2014
18:00

Moldova	0–3	England
	Report	Berahino 16', 51'; Kane 84'

Sheriff Stadium, Tiraspol
Attendance: 2,654
Referee: Mete Kalkavan (Turkey)
9 September 2014
18:00

Finland	5–0	San Marino
Väyrynen 8'; Väisänen 26'; D. O'Shaughnessy 57'; Hovi 64'; Lam 79'	Report

Wiklöf Holding Arena, Mariehamn
Referee: Edin Jakupović (Bosnia and Herzegovina)

== Goalscorers ==
9 goals

- (England) Saido Berahino

6 goals

- (Finland) Tim Väyrynen

5 goals

- (England) Harry Kane
- (Moldova) Igor Dima

4 goals

- (Moldova) Nicolae Milinceanu

3 goals

- (England) Michael Keane
- (England) Nathan Redmond
- (Lithuania) Lukas Spalvis
- (Wales) Tom Lawrence

2 goals

- (England) Danny Ings
- (England) Ravel Morrison
- (England) Raheem Sterling
- (England) James Ward-Prowse
- (Finland) Moshtagh Yaghoubi
- (San Marino) Juri Biordi
- (Wales) Wes Burns
- (Wales) Lee Evans

1 goal

- (England) Will Hughes
- (England) Tom Ince
- (England) Carl Jenkinson
- (Finland) Kastriot Kastrati
- (Finland) Daniel O'Shaughnessy
- (Finland) Patrick O'Shaughnessy
- (Finland) Joel Pohjanpalo
- (Finland) Dani Hatakka
- (Finland) Kimmo Hovi
- (Finland) Thomas Lam
- (Finland) Sauli Väisänen
- (Moldova) Gheorghe Anton
- (Moldova) Constantin Bogdan
- (Moldova) Ion Ursu
- (Lithuania) Donatas Kazlauskas
- (Lithuania) Edvardas Tamulevičius
- (Lithuania) Ovidijus Verbickas
- (Wales) Billy Bodin
- (Wales) Gwion Edwards
- (Wales) Ellis Harrison
- (Wales) Emyr Huws
- (Wales) Lee Lucas
