= Daniel Mathews =

Daniel Mathews may refer to:

- Daniel Koat Mathews (1937–2018), Sudanese politician
- Daniel T. J. Mathews, American politician from Mississippi
- Dan Mathews (born 1964), American activist

== See also ==
- Daniel Matthews (disambiguation)
