= Chol (South Sudanese name) =

Chol is a South Sudanese name that may refer to the following notable people:

Given name

- Chol Ajongo Mawut, South Sudanese politician
- Chol Marial (born 1999), South Sudanese basketball player
- Chol Thon Balok, South Sudanese politician
- Chol Tong Mayay Jang, South Sudanese politician

Middle name

- Martha Chol Luak, South Sudanese politician
- Peter Chol Wal, South Sudanese politician
- Zakaria Chol Gideon Gakmar (1957–2010), Sudanese politician

Surname

- Angelo Chol (born 1993), South Sudanese basketball player
- Ajak Chol (born 1990), South Sudanese-born Australian rapper known under the stage name Bangs
- Barnaba Bak Chol (born 1982), South Sudanese politician
- Dhour Ngor Chol (born 1993), South Sudanese football midfielder
- John Kuol Chol (born 1999), South Sudanese football defender
- Mabior Chol (born 1997), Australian rules footballer
- Machop Chol (born 1998), South Sudanese football forward
- Peter Chol (born 1994), South Sudanese football midfielder
- Puot Kang Chol (born 1985), South Sudanese politician
- Ret Chol, Southern Sudanese politician

== See also ==
- Chul (Korean name) that is often spelled as Chol
