= RET =

RET or Ret may refer to:

== People ==
- Ret Chhon (born 1940), former Cambodian cyclist
- Ret Chol (died 2004), Southern Sudanese politician
- Ret Kritzon (1979–), American Expert 3D Environment Artist for Video Games
- Ret Turner (1929–2016), American costume designer

== Engineering and computer science ==
- Renewable energy target
- Renewable energy technology
- Resolution enhancement technology, image processing technology used to manipulate dot characteristics
- ret, return from subroutine instruction in the x86 assembly language
- Registered engineering technologist, former certification in Alberta, Canada
- Rehabilitation engineering technologist, a role in rehabilitation engineering
- Ret, a measurement of the resistance to evaporative heat loss

== Transportation ==
- Retford railway station, Nottinghamshire, England (station code: RET)
- Rotterdamse Elektrische Tram, the main public transport operator of Rotterdam, the Netherlands
- Røst Airport, Norway (IATA code)
- Rapid-exit taxiway allowing an aircraft to leave a runway quickly

== Biology ==
- RET proto-oncogene, a gene on human chromosome 10
- Resonance energy transfer, a mechanism describing energy transfer between two chromophores

== Education ==
- Research Experiences for Teachers, a program of the National Science Foundation
- Russell Education Trust, a Multi-Academy free school Trust

== Other ==
- Rational Emotive Therapy, therapy now referred to as rational emotive behavior therapy
- Rational Expectations Theory, economic model-consistent expectations
- Resistance exercise training, a type of physical exercise
- Retatrutide, an experimental obesity drug developed by Eli Lilly and Company.
- Reticulum, a constellation abbreviated Ret
- Reț, a village in Blăjeni Commune, Hunedoara County, Romania
