= Biordi =

Biordi is a surname. Notable people with the surname include:

- Francesco Maria Biordi (1764–1817), Italian prelate
- Juri Biordi (born 1995), Sammarinese football defender
- Ubaldo Biordi (1938/39 – 2026), Sammarinese politician
