= Daniel Matthews =

Daniel Matthews or Dan Matthews may refer to:

- Daniel P. Matthews (1931–1953), United States Marine Corps sergeant and Medal of Honor recipient
- Dan Mathews (born 1964), senior vice president of People for the Ethical Treatment of Animals
- Daniel Matthews, missionary who founded Maloga Mission, New South Wales, Australia in 1874
- Daniel Matthews, winner of the 2018 British Sports Journalism Awards winners for Young Sports Writer

== See also ==
- Daniel Mathews (disambiguation)
- Don Matthews
- Matthew Daniels
