= Patrick O'Shaughnessy =

Patrick O'Shaughnessy may refer to:

- Patrick O'Shaughnessy (footballer) (born 1993), Finnish footballer
- Patrick O'Shaughnessy (politician) (1872–1920), Irish nationalist MP for County Limerick West 1900–1918
