= Chol =

Chol may refer to:

== Villages ==
- Chol, Iran, a village in Chaharmahal and Bakhtiari Province, Iran
- Choll, a village in Palau

== Terms ==
- Chol (South Sudanese name)
- Chul (Korean name)
- Chol (Bible), a Hebrew term used in the Bible

== Other uses ==
- Chol HaMoed, the middle days of Passover and Sukkot
- Col language, a Malayic language
- Chʼol language, a Mayan language
  - Ch'ol people, speakers of the language
- Cholesterol, type of steroid

== See also ==
- Ch'ol (disambiguation)
