= Naby Keïta =

Guinean footballer (born 1995)

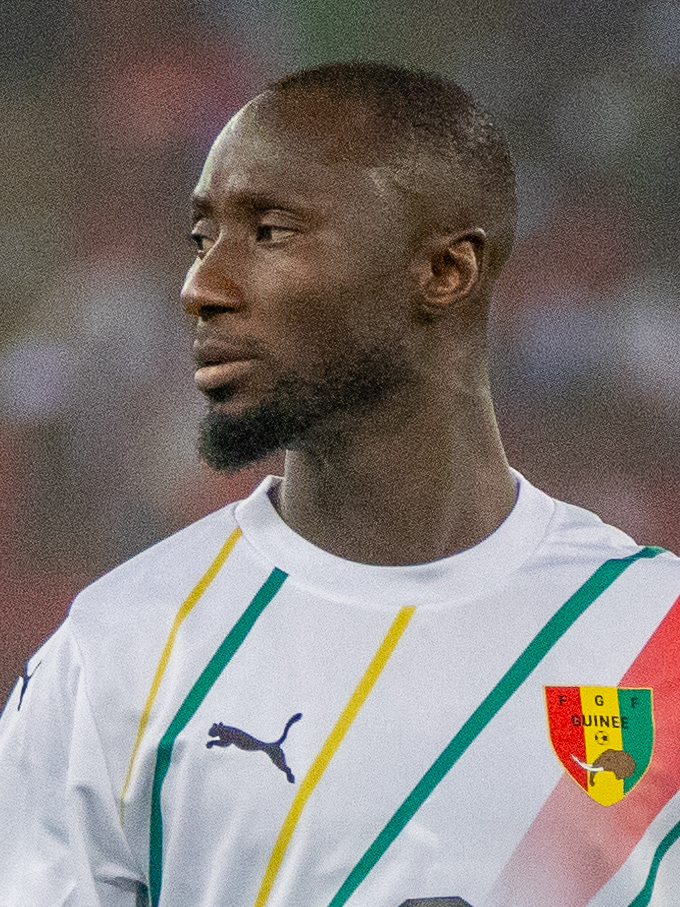
- Keïta with Guinea at the 2023 Africa Cup of Nations

Personal information
- Full name: Naby Laye Keïta
- Date of birth: 10 February 1995 (age 31)
- Place of birth: Conakry, Guinea
- Height: 1.72 m (5 ft 8 in)
- Position: Central midfielder

Team information
- Current team: Ferencváros
- Number: 5

Youth career
- 2004–2012: Horoya

Senior career*
Years	Team	Apps	(Gls)
2012–2013	Horoya		
2013–2014	Istres	23	(4)
2014–2016	Red Bull Salzburg	59	(17)
2016–2018	RB Leipzig	58	(14)
2018–2023	Liverpool	84	(7)
2023–2026	Werder Bremen	5	(0)
2025–2026	→ Ferencváros (loan)	20	(0)
2026–	Ferencváros	0	(0)

International career^{‡}
2024	Guinea Olympic (O.P.)	2	(0)
2012–	Guinea	56	(11)
- * Club domestic league appearances and goals as of 4 December 2025 (UTC) ‡ National team caps and goals as of 12 September 2026

Naby Laye Keïta (born 10 February 1995) is a Guinean professional footballer who plays as a central midfielder for NB I club Ferencváros, and captains the Guinea national team.

Keïta began his professional career with Ligue 2 club FC Istres in 2013, and a year later he moved to Red Bull Salzburg, where he won the Austrian Football Bundesliga and Austrian Cup double in both of his seasons. He then moved to RB Leipzig in 2016, making the Bundesliga team of the season in his first year and the UEFA Europa League squad of the season in his second. He agreed to join Liverpool in 2017, and completed the move a year later, winning the UEFA Champions League in his first season at the club, and the FIFA Club World Cup and Premier League the following season.

Keïta made his senior international debut for Guinea in 2012. He has earned over 50 caps and was part of their squad at the Africa Cup of Nations in 2015, 2019, 2021 and 2023. He represented Guinea at the 2024 Summer Olympics and was chosen as his country's flag bearer.

== Early life ==
Naby Laye Keïta was born on 10 February 1995 in Conakry.

== Club career ==
=== Istres ===
Keïta joined hometown club Horoya AC aged nine. He moved to France in 2012, joining the youth team of FC Istres after unsuccessful trials at FC Lorient and Le Mans FC.

In 2013, he was promoted to the first team of Istres. He made his Ligue 2 debut on 22 November 2013 against Nîmes Olympique. He scored 11 goals in 23 games in his first season as a professional, before his team was relegated to the Championnat National.

=== Red Bull Salzburg ===
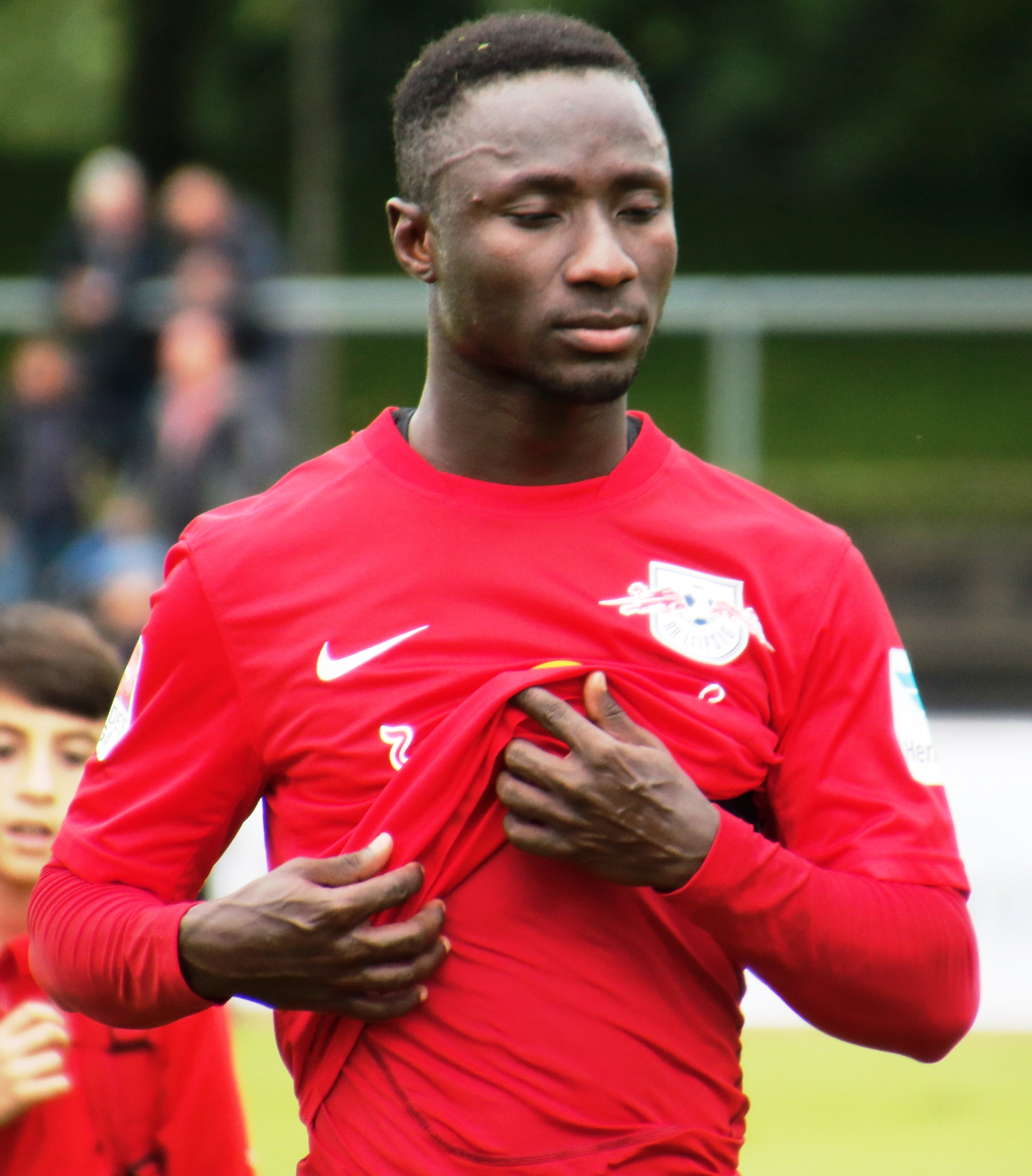
Keïta playing for RB Leipzig in 2016

In July 2014, he joined Austrian top division side Red Bull Salzburg. He made his league debut on 26 July 2014 against Wiener Neustadt. Keïta ended the season with five goals and two assists in 30 games, winning the league and cup double. The following season, he was selected as the Austrian Bundesliga Player of the Year.

He would make his debut in the 2015–16 season on 25 July 2015 against where he scored the teams only goal as they lost 2–1. Keïta would finish the season with twelve goals and 7 assists in 29 games.

=== RB Leipzig ===
In June 2016, Keïta moved to Red Bull Salzburg sister-club RB Leipzig, who had just been promoted to the German Bundesliga. He scored the winner on his league debut against Borussia Dortmund and scored seven more goals in his debut Bundesliga season. He was named in the league's team of the season.

Keïta was named in the squad of the season for the 2017–18 UEFA Europa League, in which his team were quarter-finalists. He would finish the 2017–18 season with six goals and five assists in 31 games.

=== Liverpool ===
==== 2017–18 season ====
On 28 August 2017, a deal was struck for Keïta to join Liverpool on 1 July 2018 after the English club triggered his £48 million release clause in addition to paying an undisclosed premium. It was then reported that there would be no premium (£48 million total) if Leipzig did not qualify for European football, £4.75 million (£52.75 million total) if they qualified for the Europa League and £11 million (£59 million total) if they finished in the Champions League spots. Leipzig ultimately finished 6th in the Bundesliga, therefore qualifying for the Europa League.

==== 2018–19 season ====
Upon joining Liverpool, he was handed the number 8 shirt by Liverpool legend, Steven Gerrard, which had been vacated upon the departure of Gerrard to LA Galaxy in 2015. Keïta made his debut for Liverpool against West Ham United on 12 August 2018 and played a part in the opening goal for Mohamed Salah in a 4–0 win.

On 5 April 2019, Keïta scored his first goal for Liverpool in a 3–1 win against Southampton, and added a first European goal four days later against Porto in the UEFA Champions League quarter-final first leg. He was injured in May 2019, ruling him out for the rest of the season. Although Keïta was injured, he won his first Liverpool title while out of the matchday squad as his teammates secured the win in the Champions League final against Tottenham Hotspur in early June.

==== 2019–20 season ====
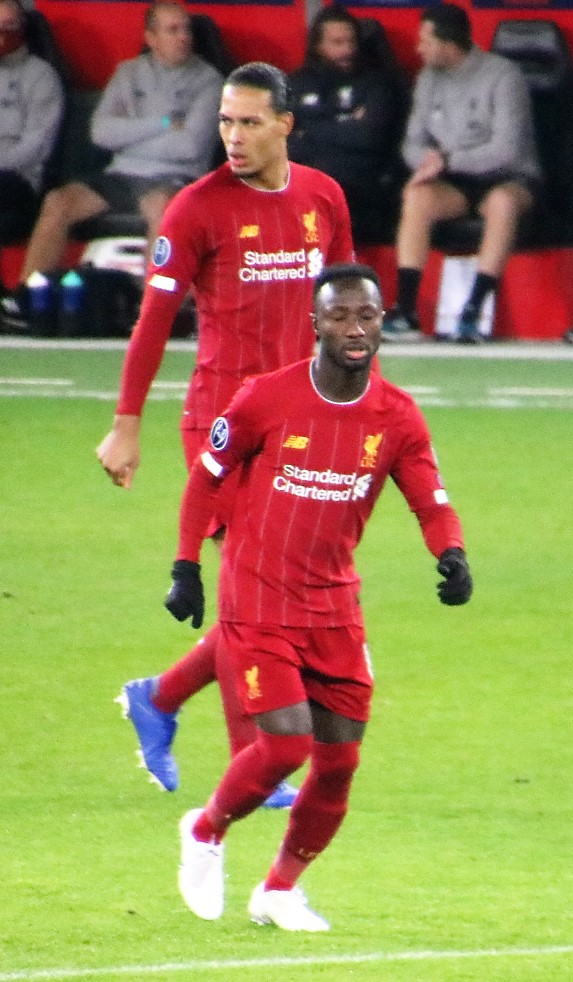
Keïta (front) playing for Liverpool in 2019

Hampered by injury, Keïta was a fringe player during the early part of the subsequent season. On 7 December, he provided a goal and assist in a 3–0 win away against AFC Bournemouth, a game which marked his first league start of the season. On 10 December, he provided Liverpool's first goal in a 2–0 Champions League win against his former club, Salzburg, which saw the reigning European champions progress to the knockout stages as the victors of Group E.

On 18 December, he scored the opening goal in a 2–1 win over Mexican club Monterrey as Liverpool progressed to the Club World Cup final; three days later, on 21 December, he started in the final against Flamengo, playing 100 minutes until being substituted as Liverpool won 1–0 to be crowned world club champions. On 2 January 2020, he was named in the starting line-up against Sheffield United, but was withdrawn after sustaining a groin injury during the warm-up, being replaced by James Milner. At the end of the season, Keïta won the Premier League title with Liverpool.

==== 2022–23 season ====
On 17 May 2023, Liverpool announced that Keita would be leaving the club once his contract expired in the summer. Injuries meant he started only 49 Premier League games during his time with the club.

=== Werder Bremen ===
On 9 June 2023, Bundesliga club Werder Bremen announced that Keita would join the club as a free agent. While sporting director Frank Baumann labelled Keita's signing as a "no-brainer" ahead of the season, Keita eventually failed to impress, starting just one competitive game. Ahead of Bremen's Bundesliga match against Bayer Leverkusen on 14 April 2024, Keita refused to board the team bus to the stadium and headed home, after being told he would not be part of the starting line-up. The club subsequently suspended him and fined him "a significant amount".

=== Ferencváros ===
On 10 December 2024, it was announced that Keita would join Nemzeti Bajnokság I club Ferencvárosi TC on loan in January. The deal reportedly included an option to purchase and would last until the end of the year. On 23 February he would make his debut for Ferencváros getting subbed on for Adama Traoré; they won the match 3–1 against Fehérvár. He would get his first assist for the club on 2 March with a goal scored by Aleksandar Pešić. The match ended in a 2–2 tie. He would start his first game on 9 March against Debreceni which they won 1–0.

The transfer was made permanent on 14 January 2026. On 9 May 2026, he won the 2025–26 Magyar Kupa season with Ferencváros by beating Zalaegerszegi TE 1–0 in the 2026 Magyar Kupa final at Puskás Aréna.

== International career ==
On 14 December 2012, Keïta made his international debut for the Guinea national team against Sierra Leone in a 2014 African Nations Championship qualification match. He scored the opener for his side in a 1–1 away draw.

Keïta was included in Michel Dussuyer's 23-man squad for the 2015 Africa Cup of Nations in Equatorial Guinea. In the opening match against the Ivory Coast, he was struck in the face by Gervinho, who was red carded for it.

On 12 November 2015, Keïta scored his first international goal in three years, in a 1–0 away win against Namibia in the first leg of the second round of 2018 FIFA World Cup qualification. Three days later in the return leg – in Morocco due to the Ebola virus epidemic in Guinea – he scored again in a 2–0 win.

Manager Paul Put chose Keïta for the 2019 Africa Cup of Nations in Egypt, where he was affected by injuries. In January 2022, Keïta helped Guinea qualify for the round of 16 of the 2021 Africa Cup of Nations in Cameroon. His performances saw him earn a place in the tournament's best eleven of the group stage. However, Guinea were eliminated after a loss to Gambia, a match Keïta could not play due to yellow cards accumulation.

== Style of play ==
While writing for The Guardian, Nick Ames and Nick Miller described Keïta as "a dynamic, box-to-box central midfielder," likening him to N'Golo Kanté. They also noted, however, that he is able to distribute the ball with range and accuracy, and score goals, which has instead frequently led him to be compared to Brazilian-Portuguese former playmaker Deco. David Usher of ESPN has described Keïta as an energetic midfielder, with good defensive qualities, which also allows him to play in a holding role if necessary. Usher went on to note that Keïta is "quick, skillful, creative and direct. He can dribble, pass and shoot, and he frequently makes the spectacular look routine". Ralf Rangnick attributes him having a natural 360° radar.

== Personal life ==
Keïta has a younger brother, Petit Keïta, who was previously on the books with German side Inter Leipzig. In October 2018, it was reported that he had been training at Liverpool's Academy, although he was not offered a contract.

In 2017, Keïta was charged with presenting false documents. The German newspaper Bild reported that, in early December 2016 and again six weeks later, he had presented two fake Guinean driving licences in order to obtain a driving licence in Germany. The district court in Leipzig (Amtsgericht Leipzig) fined him €415,000, basing the sentence on Keïta's estimated annual income of around €3 million. Keïta's lawyer filed an appeal. The appeals court reduced the fine to €250,000.

In September 2021, Keïta, his Guinean teammates and their opponents from Morocco were stranded during the 2021 Guinean coup d'état. All returned home safely.

In July 2024, Keïta was named in Guinea's squad for the 2024 Olympics in France, as one of the three overage players. He was then chosen to be his country's flag bearer during the opening ceremony of the event.

== Career statistics ==
=== Club ===
As of match played 23 October 2025

Appearances and goals by club, season and competition
Club	Season	League			National cup (Note: Includes Coupe de France, Austrian Cup, DFB-Pokal, FA Cup, Hungarian Cup)		League cup (Note: Includes EFL Cup)		Europe		Other		Total	
Club	Season	Division	Apps	Goals	Apps	Goals	Apps	Goals	Apps	Goals	Apps	Goals	Apps	Goals
Istres	2013–14	Ligue 2	23	4	1	0	—		—		—		24	4
Red Bull Salzburg	2014–15	Austrian Bundesliga	30	5	4	0	—		10 (Note: Four appearances in UEFA Champions League, six appearances and one goal in UEFA Europa League)	1	—		44	6
Red Bull Salzburg	2015–16	Austrian Bundesliga	29	12	5	2	—		3 (Note: Two appearances in UEFA Champions League, one appearance in UEFA Europa League)	0	—		37	14
Red Bull Salzburg	Total		59	17	9	2	—		13	1	0	0	81	20
RB Leipzig	2016–17	Bundesliga	31	8	1	0	—		—		—		32	8
RB Leipzig	2017–18	Bundesliga	27	6	2	1	—		10 (Note: Five appearances and two goals in UEFA Champions League, five appearances in UEFA Europa League)	2	—		39	9
RB Leipzig	Total		58	14	3	1	—		10	2	0	0	71	17
Liverpool	2018–19	Premier League	25	2	1	0	1	0	6 (Note: Appearances in UEFA Champions League)	1	0	0	33	3
Liverpool	2019–20	Premier League	18	2	0	0	2	0	4	1	3 (Note: One appearance in FA Community Shield, two appearances and one goal in FIFA Club World Cup)	1	27	4
Liverpool	2020–21	Premier League	10	0	0	0	1	0	4	0	1 (Note: Appearance in FA Community Shield)	0	16	0
Liverpool	2021–22	Premier League	23	3	4	0	3	0	10	1	—		40	4
Liverpool	2022–23	Premier League	8	0	3	0	1	0	0	0	1	0	13	0
Liverpool	Total		84	7	8	0	8	0	24	3	5	1	129	11
Werder Bremen	2023–24	Bundesliga	5	0	0	0	—		—		—		5	0
Werder Bremen	2024–25	Bundesliga	0	0	0	0	—		—		—		0	0
Werder Bremen	Total		5	0	0	0	—		—		—		5	0
Ferencváros (loan)	2024–25	Nemzeti Bajnokság I	10	0	1	0	—		—		—		11	0
Ferencváros (loan)	2025–26	Nemzeti Bajnokság I	7	0	0	0	—		5 (Note: Two appearances in UEFA Champions League, three appearances in UEFA Europa League)	0	—		12	0
Ferencváros (loan)	Total		17	0	1	0	—		5	0	—		23	0
Career total			246	42	22	3	8	0	52	6	5	1	333	52

=== International ===
As of match played 2 February 2024

Appearances and goals by national team and year
National team	Year	Apps	Goals
Guinea
Guinea	2014	7	0
Guinea	2015	11	2
Guinea	2016	4	0
Guinea	2017	5	3
Guinea	2018	4	0
Guinea	2019	4	1
Guinea	2020	2	1
Guinea	2021	5	0
Guinea	2022	6	3
Guinea	2023	4	1
Guinea	2024	4	0
Total		56	11

As of match played 2 February 2024
Guinea score listed first, score column indicates score after each Keïta goal.

List of international goals scored by Naby Keïta
No.	Date	Venue	Cap	Opponent	Score	Result	Competition	Ref.
1	12 November 2015	Sam Nujoma Stadium, Windhoek, Namibia	19	Namibia	1–0	1–0	2018 FIFA World Cup qualification	
2	15 November 2015	Stade Mohammed V, Casablanca, Morocco	20	Namibia	2–0	2–0	2018 FIFA World Cup qualification	
3	10 June 2017	Stade Bouaké, Bouaké, Ivory Coast	26	Ivory Coast	3–2	3–2	2019 Africa Cup of Nations qualification	
4	31 August 2017	Stade du 28 Septembre, Conakry, Guinea	27	Libya	1–0	3–2	2018 FIFA World Cup qualification	
5	7 October 2017	Stade du 28 Septembre, Conakry, Guinea	29	Tunisia	1–0	1–4	2018 FIFA World Cup qualification	
6	14 November 2019	Stade du 26 Mars, Bamako, Mali	36	Mali	1–1	2–2	2021 Africa Cup of Nations qualification	
7	15 November 2020	Stade Omnisports Idriss Mahamat Ouya, N'Djamena, Chad	39	Chad	1–0	1–1	2021 Africa Cup of Nations qualification	
8	6 January 2022	Amahoro Stadium, Kigali, Rwanda	45	Rwanda	2–0	2–0	Friendly	
9	18 January 2022	Ahmadou Ahidjo Stadium, Yaoundé, Cameroon	48	Zimbabwe	1–2	1–2	2021 Africa Cup of Nations	
10	9 June 2022	General Lansana Conté Stadium, Conakry, Guinea	50	Malawi	1–0	1–0	2023 Africa Cup of Nations qualification	
11	27 March 2023	Prince Moulay Abdellah Stadium, Rabat, Morocco	52	Ethiopia	1–0	3–2	2023 Africa Cup of Nations qualification	

== Honours ==
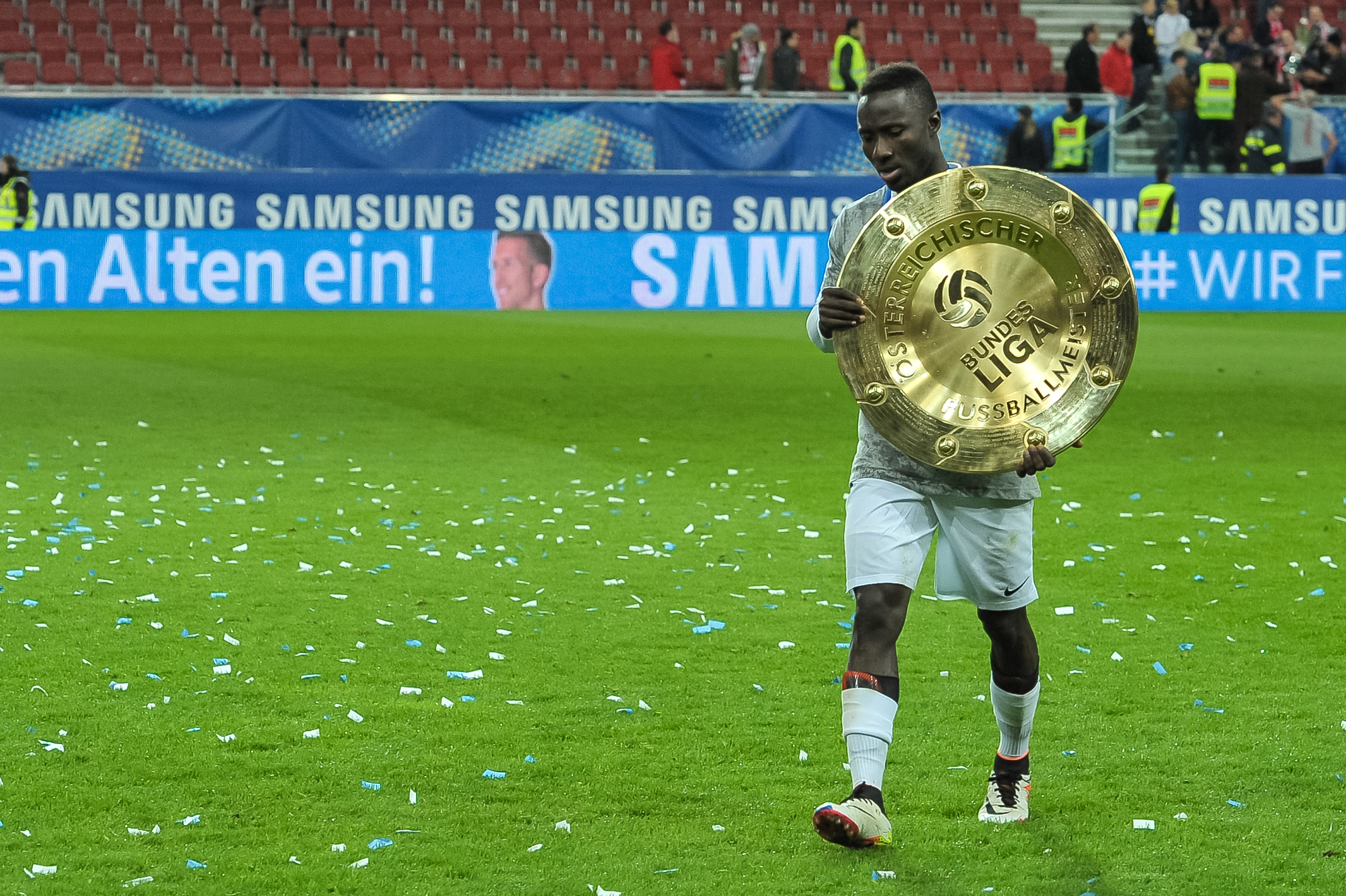
Keïta after winning the 2015–16 Austrian Cup with Red Bull Salzburg

Red Bull Salzburg

- Austrian Bundesliga: 2014–15, 2015–16
- Austrian Cup: 2014–15, 2015–16

Liverpool

- Premier League: 2019–20
- FA Cup: 2021–22
- EFL Cup: 2021–22
- FA Community Shield: 2022
- UEFA Champions League: 2018–19; runner-up: 2021–22
- UEFA Super Cup: 2019
- FIFA Club World Cup: 2019

Ferencváros

- Nemzeti Bajnokság I: 2024–25
- Hungarian Cup: 2025–26

Individual

- Footballer of the Year in Guinea: 2015, 2021
- Austrian Football Bundesliga Player of the Year: 2015–16
- Bundesliga Team of the Season: 2016–17
- UEFA Europa League Squad of the Season: 2017–18
- CAF Team of the Year: 2018
