= 2014–15 FC Red Bull Salzburg season =

Red Bull Salzburg
2014–15 season
- Sporting Director: Ralf Rangnick
- Manager: Adi Hütter
- Stadium: Red Bull Arena
- Bundesliga: 1st
- ÖFB-Cup: Winners
- Champions League: Play-off round (vs. Malmö)
- Europa League: Round of 32 vs (vs. Villarreal)
- Top goalscorer: League: Jonathan Soriano (31); All: Jonathan Soriano (46)
- Highest home attendance: 29,110 vs Malmö (19 August 2014)
- Lowest home attendance: 6,898 vs Rheindorf Altach (7 March 2015)
- Average home league attendance: 13,014 (24 May 2015)
Home colours	Away colours	Third colours

The 2014–15 FC Red Bull Salzburg season was the 82nd season in club history. Red Bull Salzburg finished the season as champions of the Bundesliga and the ÖFB-Cup for the second season in a row. In Europe, Salzburg were knocked out of the Champions League by Malmö in the playoff round, dropping into the Europa League where they reached the round of 32 before defeat to Villarreal.

== Season events ==
Red Bull Salzburg come into the 2014–15 season as league and cup champions. Peter Ankersen and Benno Schmitz transferred to Red Bull Salzburg. Florian Klein and Marco Meilinger left the club. Eddie Gustafsson retired at the end of the 2013–14 season. Roger Schmidt left the club to become the head coach at Bayer Leverkusen. Adi Hütter was named Schmidt's replacement. Pre–season started on 16 June.

Nils Quaschner was sold during the January transfer window. However, FIFA didn't allow the transfer because he had played for two teams during the season. He had also played for FC Liefering. FIFA transfer rules don't allow player to play for more than two teams during a season.

=== Bundesliga ===
==== Matchdays 1–9 ====
On 19 July, in the opening match of the league season, Red Bull Salzburg defeated Rapid Wien 6–1 with two goals from Jonathan Soriano and a goal each from Andreas Ulmer, Alan, Sadio Mané, and Kevin Kampl. Steffen Hofmann scored for Rapid Wien. Red Bull took a 2–0 first–half lead with a 30th-minute goal from Andreas Ulmer and a 40th-minute goal from Alan. Red Bull scored four more goals in the second–half with a 69th-minute goal from Sadio Mané, a 77th minute and 79th-minute goals from Jonathan Soriano, and an 85th-minute goal from Kevin Kampl. Steffen Hofmann scored for Rapid Wien from the penalty spot in stoppage time. Red Bull finished the opening round in first place. On 26 July, on matchday two, Red Bull defeated Wiener Neustadt 5–0 with two goals from Jonathan Soriano and a goal each from Marcel Sabitzer, Christian Schwegler, Kevin Kampl, and André Ramalho Silva. Marcel Sabitzer opened the scored in the 15th minute which gave Red Bull a 1–0 half–time lead. Then in the 47th minute, Jonathan Soriano scored his first goal of the match. Christian Schwegler and Kevin Kampl added to the lead in the 53rd and 55th minutes. Jonathan Soriano finished the scoring with a goal from the penalty spot in the 75th minute. Red Bull's Sadio Mané and Wiener Neustadt's Remo Mally were sent–off during the match. Red Bull finished the matchday in first place. Then on 2 August, on matchday three, Red Bull defeated Ried 2–0 with goals from Franz Schiemer and Massimo Bruno. Franz Schiemer opened the scoring in the 50th minute and Massimo Bruno added the other goal in stoppage time in the second–half. Franz Schiemer was also sent–off for a second yellow card. Red Bull finished the matchday in first place. On 10 August, on matchday four, Red Bull defeated Grödig 8–0 with five goals from Jonathan Soriano and a goal each from Sadio Mané, Marcel Sabitzer, and Valentino Lazaro. Jonathan Soriano's opened the scoring with his first goal in the 13th minute. Then Sadio Mané and Marcel Sabitzer scored two minutes apart in the 20th and 22nd minutes. Jonathan Soriano scored the next four goals in the 39th, 44th, 54th and 65th minutes. Valentino Lazaro finished the scoring in the 74th minute. Red Bull finished the matchday in first place. On 16 August, on matchday five, Red Bull defeated Admira Wacker 3–0 with goals from Massimo Bruno, Christian Schwegler, and Marcel Sabitzer. Massimo Bruno opened the scoring with a volley in the 24th minute. Christian Schwegler increased the lead to 2–0 in the 50th minute. Marcel Sabitzer completed the scoreline with a goal in the 74th minute. Red Bull finishedthe matchday in first place. On 23 August, on matchday six, Red Bull defeated Rheindorf Altach 5–0 with two goals from Alan and a goal each from Jonathan Soriano, Massimo Bruno, and Valentino Lazaro. The first goal of the match came when Jonathan Soriano scored from the penalty spot in the 12th minute. Massimo Bruno scored in the 16th minute and Alan scored in the 38th minute to give Red Bull a 3–0 first–half lead. Alan got his second goal of the match in the 77th minute and Valentino Lazaro scored in stoppage time to complete the 5–0 scoreline. Felix Roth was sent–off for Rheindorf Altach. Red Bull finished the matchday in first place. Red Bull suffered their first defeat of the season on matchday seven, on 30 August, with a 3–2 loss to Sturm Graz. Kevin Kampl and Jonathan Soriano scored for Red Bull. Sturm Graz got two goals from Marko Stanković and a goal from Marco Djuricin. Marko Stanković gave Sturm Graz a 2–0 lead with goals in the fourth and 14th minutes. Red Bull then equalized with a 35th-minute goal from Kevin Kampl and a 55th-minute goal from Jonathan Soriano. Then Marco Djuricin gave Sturm Graz a 3–2 lead in the 90th minute. Red Bull finished the matchday in first place. Then Red Bull lost to Wolfsberg 1–0 on matchday eight, on 14 September. Tadej Trdina scored in the 26th minute and Christopher Wernitznig was sent–off in the 44th minute for Wolfsberg. Red Bull finished the matchday in second place. Red Bull lost their third straight match when they lost to Austria Wien 3–2 on matchday nine, on 21 September. Alan gave Red Bull a 1–0 lead in the 31st minute. Marco Meilinger equalized in the 34th minute and David de Paula gave Austria the lead in the 38 minute. Alan equalized in the 68th minute with his second goal of the match. Omer Damari won the match for Austria in the 86th minute. Martin Hinteregger was sent–off. Red Bull finished the matchday in second place.

==== Matchdays 10–18 ====
On matchday 10, on 28 September, Red Bull defeated Rapid Wien 2–1. Massimo Bruno gave Red Bull a 1–0 lead in the 84th minute. Alan put Red Bull up 2–0 in the 89th minute. Philipp Prosenik pulled one back in stoppage time for Rapid Wien. Red Bull finished the matchday in second place. Then on matchday 11, on 5 October, Red Bull defeated Wiener Neustadt 4–1 with goals from Peter Ankersen, Marcel Sabitzer, Jonathan Soriano, and Kevin Kampl. Herbert Rauter scored for Wiener Neustadt. Ankersen and Sabitzer put Red Bull up 2–0 with goals in the third and 22nd minutes. 10 minutes later, Rauter pulled a goal back for Weiner Neustadt. In the 78th minute, Soriano put Red Bull up 3–1 and Kampl finished the scoring with an 85th-minute goal to make it 4–1. Red Bull finished the matchday in second place. On matchday 12, on 18 October, Red Bull defeated Ried 4–2. Jonathan Soriano and Marcel Sabitzer scored two goals each for Red Bull and Denis Thomalla and Clemens Walch scored for Ried. Soriano opened the scoring in the 13th minute. Thomalla equalized for Ried 30 minutes later. Two minutes later, Soriano gave Red Bull the lead again. Red Bull led 2–1 at half–time. Walch equalized for Ried in the 62nd minute. Sabitzer scored a goal in the 84th minute and his second goal in stoppage time to put Red Bull up 4–2. Red Bull finished the matchday in first place. On matchday 13, on 26 October, Red Bull and Grödig battled to a 2–2 draw. Yordy Reyna opened the scoring for Grödig in the seventh minute. Kevin Kampl equalized 15 minutes later. Grödig regained the lead when Philipp Huspek scored from the penalty spot. Marcel Sabitzer finished the scoring in the 81st minute. Péter Gulácsi of Red Bull was sent–off. Red Bull finished the matchday in first place. On matchday 14, on 1 November, Red Bull defeated Admira Wacker 2–0 with two goals from Jonathan Soriano. Patrick Wessely of Admira Wacker was sent–off. Red Bull finished the matchday in first place. On matchday 15, on 9 November, Rheindorf Altach defeated Red Bull 4–1. Johannes Aigner, Ismael Shradi-Tajouri, Ivan Kovacec, and Louis Ngwat-Mahop scored for Altach and Massimo Bruno scored for Red Bull. Aigner opened the scoring in the fourth minute to give Altach a 1–0 lead. Then Bruno equalized for Red Bull in the 53rd minute. Shradi-Tajouri then put Altach in the lead again when he scored in the 62nd minute. Kovacec and Ngwat-Mahop scored in the last 10 minutes to give Altach a 4–1 win. Red Bull finished the matchday in first place. On matchday 16, on 23 November, Red Bull defeated Sturm Graz 2–1. Massimo Bruno and Jonathan Soriano scored for Red Bull and Marco Djuricin scored for Sturm Graz. The match, on matchday 17, on 30 November, between Red Bull and Wolfsberg finished in a 2–2 draw. Jonathan Soriano scored two goals for Red Bull and Christopher Wernitznig and Roland Putsche scored for Wolfsberg. Wolfsberg took a 2–0 lead when Wernitznig scored in the 28th minute and Putsche scored in the 66th minute. Soriano then scored in the 87th minute and stoppage time in the second half. Both of Soriano's goals were from penalty shots. Red Bull finished the matchday in first place. On matchday 18, on 6 December, Red Bull defeated Austria Wien 4–2. Red Bull got three goals from Alan and a goal from Marcel Sabitzer. Alexander Gorgon and Alexander Grünwald scored for Austria Wien. Austria Wien took a 2–0 lead when Gorgon scored in the seventh minute and Grünwald scored in the 20th minute. However, Alan scored in the 52nd, 58th, and 60th minutes to give Red Bull a 3–2 lead. Sabitzer made it 4–2 in the 68th minute. Thomas Salamon was sent–off for Austria Wien for a second bookable offence. Red Bull finished the matchday in first place.

==== Matchdays 19–27 ====
On matchday 19, on 14 December, Red Bull lost to Rapid Wien 2–1. Marcel Sabitzer scored for Red Bull in the 84th minute. Robert Berić scored in the 80th minute and stoppage time in the second half. André Ramalho was sent–off for a second bookable offence. Red Bull finished the matchday in sixth place. On matchday 20, on 14 February, Red Bull defeated Wiener Neustadt 2–0 with two goals, in the 50th and 67th minutes, from Jonathan Soriano. Red Bull finished the matchday in first place. The match against Ried, on matchday 21, on 22 February, finished in a 2–2 draw. Felipe Pires gave Red Bull the lead in the 33rd minute. Then Denis Thomalla gave Ried a 2–1 lead when he scored two goals in the 53rd and 65th minutes. Naby Keïta equalized in the 69th minute.

=== Austrian Cup ===
On 12 July, in the first round of the Austina Cup, Red Bull Salzburg defeated 1. SC Sollenau 10–1 with four goals from Alan, two goals from Jonathan Soriano, two goals from Marcel Sabitzer, and a goal each from Sadio Mané and Andreas Ulmer. Mané opened the scoring in the 19th minute. Then Alan picked up his first goal of the match in the 24th minute. Then Soriano got his brace in the 31st and 35th minute. Then Alan picked up his second goal of the match in the 36th minute. Milan Vukovič picked up Sollenau's goal in the 38th minute. Then Alan picked up his third and fourth goals of the match in the 62nd and 70th minutes. Sabitzer opened his scoring account in the 81st minute. Ulmer then got his goal in the 87th minute. Then Sabitzer finished his scoring account in the 89th minute. Then in the second round on 29 September, Red Bull Salzburg defeated Wiener Sportklub 12–1. Marcel Sabitzer opened the scoring in the sixth minute. Jonathan Soriano picked up his first goal of the match in the 21st minute before Rafael Pollack scored 11 minutes later. Alan's 35th-minute goal and Sabitzer's 37th-minute goal rounded up the scoring in the first half to put Red Bull Salzburg up 4–1. Red Bull Salzburg scored 8 more goals in the second half. The scoring started early in the second–half. Alan completed his hat–trick when he picked up goals in the 53rd and 55th minutes. Kevin Kampl scored in the 60th minute and Christoph Leitgeb scored in the 72nd minute. Soriano completed his brace with his 75th-minute goal. Massimo Bruno and Nils Quaschner got on the scoresheet with goals in the 80th and 86th minutes. Yannick Soura finished the scoring with an own goal. In the round of 16 on 29 October, Red Bull Salzburg defeated Wacker Innsbruck 2–1 in extra time. The 90 minutes finished 0–0. The only notable events in the 90 minutes were yellow cards to Massimo Bruno in the 74th minute and Jürgen Säumel in the 90th minute. Kevin Kampl opened the scoring in the 97th minute. Wacker equalized with a 107th-minute goal from Thomas Bergmann. A minute later, Ante Roguljić scored the winning goal.

=== UEFA Champions League ===
Red Bull Salzburg entered the third qualifying round and was drawn against the winner of the Valletta–Qarabağ fixture. Qarabağ won the fixture. The match took place on 30 July. The first leg was played on 30 July which Qarabağ won 2–1. The second leg was played on 6 August which Red Bull Salzburg won 2–0. Red Bull Salzburg was then drawn against Malmö for the play–off round. On 19 August, in the first leg, Red Bull Salzburg won 2–1. Franz Schiemer and Jonathan Soriano scored for Red Bull Salzburg and Emil Forsberg scored for Malmö. In the return leg, on 27 August, Red Bull Salzburg lost to Malmö 3–0 with two goals from Markus Rosenberg and another goal from Magnus Eriksson. Malmö was awarded a penalty shot after Péter Gulácsi brought down Eriksson. Rosenburg converted the penalty in the 11th minute. Eight minutes later, Eriksson scored from 30 meters out after Gulácsi was off his line. Rosenberg got his second goal of the match with 6 minutes of normal time remaining. Malmö won the tie with a 4–2 aggregate score.

=== UEFA Europa League ===
==== Group stage ====
Red Bull Salzburg were drawn into Group D with Celtic, Dinamo Zagreb, and Astra Giurgiu. On 18 September, in the first match in their Europa League campaign, Red Bull Salzburg and Celtic finished in a 2–2 draw. Alan and Jonathan Soriano scored for Red Bull Salzburg and Wakaso Mubarak and Scott Brown scored for Celtic. Red Bull Salzburg were behind twice in the match. Mubarak opened the scoring in the 14th minute. Alan then equalized with a deflected shot in the 36th minute. However, Celtic took the lead again after André Ramalho Silva "diverted" Brown's shot in the 60th minute. Soriano equalized with a free kick in the 78th minute. Red Bull Salzburg and Celtic finished the matchday tied for second place in the group. Then on 2 October, on matchday two, Red Bull Salzburg defeated Astra Giurgiu 2–1 Kevin Kampl and Jonathan Soriano. Takayuki Seto scored for Astra Giurgiu. Seto gave Astra Giurgiu the lead in the 15th minute. However, a 36th-minute goal from Kampl and a 42nd-minute goal from Soriano gave Red Bull Salzburg the victory. Red Bull Salzburg finished the matchday in first place. On 23 October, on matchday three, Red Bull Salzburg defeated Dinamo Zagreb 4–2. Red Bull Salzburg took a 4–0 lead through three goals by Alan and another goal by André Ramalho Silva. However, Dinamo Zagreb got two goals back from an 81st-minute goal from Arijan Ademi and an 89th-minute goal from Ángelo Henríquez. Red Bull Salzburg finished the matchday in first place. Then on 6 November, on matchday four, Red Bull Salzburg defeated Dinamo Zagreb 5–1. Red Bull Salzburg took a 2–0 lead through a 39th-minute goal from Soriano and 59th minute Kampl. However, a minute later, Ángelo Henríquez scored the lone goal for Dinamo Zagreb. However, Red Bull Salzburg would go on to score three more goals. Soriano collected his second goal of the match in the 64th minute, followed by Massimo Bruno's goal in the 72nd minute, and Soriano's third goal in the 85th minute. Red Bull Salzburg clinch a spot in the knockout round with the win. Red Bull Salzburg finished the matchday in first place. On matchday five, on 27 November, Red Bull Salzburg won Group D when they defeated Celtic 3–1. Celtic also went through despite the loss. Red Bull Salzburg got two goals from Alan and another goal from Naby Keïta. Stefan Johansen scored for Celtic. Red Bull Salzburg took a 2–0 lead when Alan scored in the eighth and 13th minutes. Johansen equalized in the 30th minute. Keïta scored the winning goal for Red Bull Salzburg in stoppage time. On matchday six, on 11 December, Red Bull Salzburg defeated Astra Giurgiu 5–1. Red Bull Salzburg got two goals each from Kevin Kampl and Alan a goal from Marcel Sabitzer. George Florescu scored for Astra Giurgiu. Sabitzer scored in the 9th minute and Kampl scored in the 34th minute to give Red Bull Salzburg a 2–0 first half lead. In less than a minute after the start of the second half, Alan scored to put Red Bull Salzburg up 3–0 Florescu pulled one back for Astra Giurgiu in the 51st minute. Alan scored his second goal of the match in the 70th minute and Kampl did likewise in stoppage time to make the 5–1. Red Bull Salzburg finished the group stage undefeated.

==== Knockout phase ====
The draw for the round of 32 took place on 15 December. They went into the draw as group winners. Red Bull Salzburg were drawn against Villarreal. The first leg took place on 19 February. Villarreal won the match 2–1. Jonathan Soriano scored for Red Bull and Ikechukwu Uche and Denis Cheryshev scored for Villarreal. Uche opened up the scoring in the 32nd minute for Villarreal. Then Soriano equalized from the penalty spot in the 48th minute. Cheryshev scored the winning goal in the 54th minute.

== Squad ==
As of match played 3 June 2015

No.	Name	Nationality	Position	Date of birth (age)	Signed from	Signed in	Contract ends	Apps.	Goals
Goalkeepers
31	Péter Gulácsi	(Hungary)	GK	6 May 1990 (aged 25)	Liverpool	2013	2019	100	0
33	Alexander Walke	(Germany)	GK	6 June 1983 (aged 31)	Hansa Rostock	2010			
40	Fabian Bredlow	(Germany)	GK	2 March 1995 (aged 20)	loan from RB Leipzig	2014	2015	0	0
Defenders
2	Benno Schmitz	(Germany)	DF	17 November 1994 (aged 20)	Bayern Munich II	2014		28	0
4	Peter Ankersen	(Denmark)	DF	22 September 1990 (aged 24)	Esbjerg	2014		33	1
5	André Ramalho	(Brazil)	DF	16 February 1992 (aged 23)	Academy	2012		99	10
6	Christian Schwegler	(Switzerland)	DF	6 June 1984 (aged 30)	Young Boys	2009			
17	Andreas Ulmer	(Austria)	DF	30 October 1985 (aged 29)	SV Ried	2009			
25	Isaac Vorsah	(Ghana)	DF	21 June 1988 (aged 26)	TSG 1899 Hoffenheim	2012	2015	18	1
28	Asger Sørensen	(Denmark)	DF	5 June 1996 (aged 18)	Academy	2014		1	0
36	Martin Hinteregger	(Austria)	DF	7 September 1992 (aged 22)	Academy	2010			
45	Duje Ćaleta-Car	(Croatia)	DF	17 September 1996 (aged 18)	Pasching	2014		9	0
47	Lukas Gugganig	(Austria)	DF	14 February 1995 (aged 20)	Academy	2014		1	0
Midfielders
7	Marcel Sabitzer	(Austria)	MF	17 March 1994 (aged 21)	loan from RB Leipzig	2014		51	27
8	Naby Keïta	(Guinea)	MF	10 February 1995 (aged 20)	Istres	2014	2019	44	6
13	Stefan Ilsanker	(Austria)	MF	18 May 1989 (aged 26)	SV Mattersburg	2012		127	5
14	Valon Berisha	(Norway) (Note: Valon Berisha was born in Malmö, Sweden to Kosovo Albanian parents. Berisha qualified to represent Norway internationally, representing them at various levels until 2016, when he switched to representing Kosovo.)	MF	7 February 1993 (aged 22)	Viking	2012		99	18
24	Christoph Leitgeb	(Austria)	MF	14 April 1985 (aged 30)	Sturm Graz	2007			
37	Valentino Lazaro	(Austria)	MF	24 March 1996 (aged 19)	Academy	2012		50	6
41	Konrad Laimer	(Austria)	MF	27 May 1997 (aged 18)	Academy	2014		8	0
44	Ante Roguljić	(Croatia)	MF	11 March 1996 (aged 19)	Academy	2014		2	1
77	Massimo Bruno	(Belgium)	MF	17 September 1993 (aged 21)	loan from RB Leipzig	2014	2015	39	8
Forwards
9	Marco Djuricin	(Austria)	FW	12 December 1992 (aged 22)	Sturm Graz	2015		16	3
11	Felipe Pires	(Brazil)	FW	18 April 1995 (aged 20)	Academy	2014		11	2
18	Takumi Minamino	(Japan)	FW	16 January 1995 (aged 20)	Cerezo Osaka	2015	2018	17	3
26	Jonathan Soriano	(Spain)	FW	24 September 1985 (aged 29)	Barcelona B	2012		145	126
42	Nils Quaschner	(Germany)	FW	22 April 1994 (aged 21)	Hansa Rostock	2013		15	2
46	Smail Prevljak	(Bosnia and Herzegovina)	FW	10 May 1995 (aged 20)	loan from RB Leipzig	2014	2015	1	0
	Hwang Hee-chan	(South Korea)	FW	26 January 1996 (aged 19)	Pohang Steelers	2015		0	0
Out on loan
16	Håvard Nielsen	(Norway)	FW	15 July 1993 (aged 21)	Vålerenga	2012		45	5
19	Yordy Reyna	(Peru)	FW	17 September 1993 (aged 21)	Alianza Lima	2013	2017	9	0
21	Taxiarchis Fountas	(Greece)	FW	4 September 1995 (aged 19)	AEK Athens	2013		1	0
Left during the season
3	Douglas da Silva	(Brazil)	DF	7 March 1984 (aged 31)	Hapoel Tel Aviv	2011		18	2
10	Sadio Mané	(Senegal)	FW	10 April 1992 (aged 23)	Metz	2012		87	45
15	Franz Schiemer	(Austria)	DF	21 March 1986 (aged 29)	Austria Wien	2009			
27	Alan	(Brazil)	FW	10 July 1989 (aged 25)	Fluminense	2010		129	93
29	Rodnei	(Brazil)	DF	19 December 1980 (aged 34)	1. FC Kaiserslautern	2012	2015	30	0
44	Kevin Kampl	(Slovenia) (Note: Kevin Kampl was born in Solingen, Germany, but also qualified to represent Slovenia internationally, going on to make his debut for Slovenia in 2012.)	MF	9 October 1990 (aged 23)	VfR Aalen	2012		109	29
	Jodel Dossou	(Benin)	MF	17 March 1992 (aged 23)	Club Africain	2014		0	0
	Zymer Bytyqi	(Norway) (Note: Zymer Bytyqi was born in Sint-Truiden, Belgium to Kosovo Albanian parents. Bytyqi qualified to represent Norway internationally, representing them at various levels until 2014, when he switched to representing Kosovo.)	MF	7 February 1993 (aged 22)	Sandnes Ulf	2013		0	0
	Bright Edomwonyi	(Nigeria)	FW	24 July 1994 (aged 20)	Westerlo	2012		1	0

=== Out on loan ===
Note: Flags indicate national team as defined under FIFA eligibility rules; some limited exceptions apply. Players may hold more than one non-FIFA nationality.

No.	Pos.	Nation	Player
16	FW	NOR	Håvard Nielsen (at Eintracht Braunschweig)
19	FW	PER	Yordy Reyna (at RB Leipzig)

No.	Pos.	Nation	Player
21	FW	GRE	Taxiarchis Fountas (at Panionios)

=== Left during the season ===
Note: Flags indicate national team as defined under FIFA eligibility rules; some limited exceptions apply. Players may hold more than one non-FIFA nationality.

No.	Pos.	Nation	Player
3	DF	BRA	Douglas da Silva (to Vasco da Gama)
10	FW	SEN	Sadio Mané (to Southampton)
15	DF	AUT	Franz Schiemer (Retired)
27	FW	BRA	Alan (to Guangzhou Evergrande Taobao)
29	DF	BRA	Rodnei (to RB Leipzig)

No.	Pos.	Nation	Player
44	MF	SLO	Kevin Kampl (to Borussia Dortmund)
—	MF	BEN	Jodel Dossou
—	MF	NOR	Zymer Bytyqi (to Viking)
—	FW	NGR	Bright Edomwonyi (at Sturm Graz)

== Transfers ==
=== In ===
Date	Position	Nationality	Name	From	Fee	Ref.
1 July 2014	DF	(Croatia)	Duje Ćaleta-Car	Pasching	Undisclosed	
1 July 2014	DF	(Denmark)	Peter Ankersen	Esbjerg	Undisclosed	
1 July 2014	DF	(Germany)	Benno Schmitz	Bayern Munich II	Undisclosed	
1 July 2014	MF	(Guinea)	Naby Keïta	Istres	Undisclosed	
1 January 2015	MF	(Ghana)	David Atanga	Red Bull Ghana	Undisclosed	
1 January 2015	FW	(South Korea)	Hwang Hee-chan	Pohang Steelers	Undisclosed	
7 January 2015	FW	(Japan)	Takumi Minamino	Cerezo Osaka	Undisclosed	
8 January 2015	FW	(Austria)	Marco Djuricin	Sturm Graz	Undisclosed	

=== Loans in ===
Start date	Position	Nationality	Name	From	End date	Ref.
19 June 2014	GK	(Germany)	Fabian Bredlow	RB Leipzig	End of Season	
2 July 2014	MF	(Austria)	Marcel Sabitzer	RB Leipzig	End of Season	
2 July 2014	MF	(Belgium)	Massimo Bruno	RB Leipzig	End of Season	
27 August 2014	FW	(Bosnia and Herzegovina)	Smail Prevljak	RB Leipzig	End of Season	

=== Out ===
Date	Position	Nationality	Name	To	Fee	Ref.
19 June 2014	GK	(Germany)	Thomas Dähne	RB Leipzig	Undisclosed	
1 July 2014	MF	(Slovakia)	Dušan Švento	1. FC Köln	€2,000,000	
10 July 2014	MF	(Austria)	Robert Žulj	SpVgg Greuther Fürth	Undisclosed	
1 September 2014	FW	(Senegal)	Sadio Mané	Southampton	€15,000,000	
1 January 2015	MF	(Slovenia)	Kevin Kampl	Borussia Dortmund	€12,000,000	
6 January 2015	MF	(Norway)	Zymer Bytyqi	Viking	Undisclosed	
16 January 2015	FW	(Brazil)	Alan	Guangzhou Evergrande Taobao	€11,100,000	
1 February 2014	DF	(Brazil)	Rodnei	RB Leipzig	Free	

=== Loans out ===
Start date	Position	Nationality	Name	To	End date	Ref.
5 January 2014	FW	(Norway)	Håvard Nielsen	Eintracht Braunschweig	30 June 2015	
19 June 2014	GK	(Austria)	Alexander Schlager	RB Leipzig	End of Season	
10 July 2014	FW	(Peru)	Yordy Reyna	SV Grödig	29 January 2015	
14 August 2014	FW	(Nigeria)	Bright Edomwonyi	TSV Hartberg	31 December 2014	
20 August 2014	FW	(Greece)	Taxiarchis Fountas	Panionios	End of Season	
29 January 2015	FW	(Peru)	Yordy Reyna	RB Leipzig	End of Season	

=== Released ===
Date	Position	Nationality	Name	Joined	Date	Ref.
15 December 2014	DF	(Austria)	Franz Schiemer	Retired		
31 December 2014	DF	(Brazil)	Douglas da Silva	Vasco da Gama	1 January 2015	
31 December 2014	MF	(Benin)	Jodel Dossou	Austria Lustenau	1 July 2015	
31 December 2014	FW	(Nigeria)	Bright Edomwonyi	Sturm Graz	1 January 2015	
30 June 2015	DF	(Brazil)	André Ramalho	Bayer Leverkusen	1 July 2015	
30 June 2015	DF	(Ghana)	Isaac Vorsah	Liefering	1 July 2015	

== Competitions ==
=== Overview ===
Competition	First match	Last match	Starting round	Final position	Record							
Competition	First match	Last match	Starting round	Final position	Pld	W	D	L	GF	GA	GD	Win %
Bundesliga	19 July 2014	31 May 2015	Matchday 1	Winners	36	22	7	7	99	42	+57	61.11
Austrian Cup	12 July 2014	3 June 2015	First round	Winners	6	6	0	0	32	3	+29	100.00
Champions League	30 July 2014	27 August 2014	Third Qualifying round	Playoff round	4	2	0	2	5	6	−1	50.00
Europa League	18 September 2014	26 February 2015	Group Stage	Round of 32	8	5	1	2	23	13	+10	62.50
Total					54	35	8	11	159	64	+95	64.81

Last updated: 3 June 2015
Source: Soccerway

=== Bundesliga ===
==== League table ====
Pos	Team	Pld	W	D	L	GF	GA	GD	Pts	Qualification or relegation
1	Red Bull Salzburg (C)	36	22	7	7	99	42	+57	73	Qualification for the Champions League third qualifying round
2	Rapid Wien	36	19	10	7	68	38	+30	67	Qualification for the Champions League third qualifying round
3	SCR Altach	36	17	8	11	50	49	+1	59	Qualification for the Europa League third qualifying round
4	Sturm Graz	36	16	10	10	57	41	+16	58	Qualification for the Europa League third qualifying round
5	Wolfsberger AC	36	16	4	16	44	50	−6	52	Qualification for the Europa League second qualifying round

Source: weltfussball.de (in German)
Rules for classification: 1) points; 2) goal difference; 3) number of goals scored
(C) Champions

==== Results summary ====
Overall								Home						Away					
Pld	W	D	L	GF	GA	GD	Pts	W	D	L	GF	GA	GD	W	D	L	GF	GA	GD
36	22	7	7	99	42	+57	73	13	1	4	59	19	+40	9	6	3	40	23	+17

==== Results by round ====
Round	1	2	3	4	5	6	7	8	9	10	11	12	13	14	15	16	17	18	19	20	21	22	23	24	25	26	27	28	29	30	31	32	33	34	35	36
Ground	H	A	A	H	A	H	H	A	H	A	H	H	A	H	A	A	H	A	H	A	A	H	A	H	H	A	H	A	H	H	A	H	A	A	H	A
Result	W	W	W	W	W	W	L	L	L	W	W	W	D	W	L	W	D	W	L	W	D	W	W	L	W	L	W	D	W	W	W	W	D	D	W	D

Updated to match(es) played on 31 May 2015. Source: See Results
A = Away; H = Home; W = Win; D = Draw; L = Loss

==== Results ====
19 July 2014 1	Red Bull Salzburg	6 – 1	Rapid Wien	Wals-Siezenheim
16:30 CEST (UTC+2)	Ulmer 30'; Alan 40'; Mané 69'; Schwegler (yellow card) 74'; Soriano 77', 79'; Kampl 84' (yellow card) 85'; Ankersen (yellow card) 90+2'	Report	M.Hofmann (yellow card) 32'; Schwab (yellow card) 42'; Schrammel (yellow card) 78'; S.Hofmann 90+2' (pen.)	Stadium: Red Bull Arena; Attendance: 19,800; Referee: Alexander Harkam

26 July 2014 2	Wiener Neustadt	0 – 5	Red Bull Salzburg	Wiener Neustadt
19:00 CEST (UTC+2)	Ebenhofer (yellow card) 56'; Mally (red card) 74'	Report	Mané (yellow card) 10' (yellow-red card) 40'; Sabitzer 15'; Soriano 47', 75' (pen.); Schwegler 53'; Kampl 55'; Ramalho (yellow card) 88'	Stadium: Stadion Wiener Neustadt; Attendance: 2,900; Referee: Harald Lechner

2 August 2014 3	SV Ried	0 – 2	Red Bull Salzburg	Ried im Innkreis
19:00 CEST (UTC+2)	Schiemer (yellow card) 29' (yellow-red card) 78' (goal) 50'; Kampl (yellow card) 73'; Bruno 90+1'	Report	Janeczek (yellow card) 18'; Möschl (yellow card) 43'; Reifeltshammer (yellow card) 59'; Lainer (yellow card) 88'	Stadium: Keine Sorgen Arena; Attendance: 5,150; Referee: Markus Hameter

10 August 2014 4	Red Bull Salzburg	8 – 0	SV Grödig	Wals-Siezenheim
16:30 CEST (UTC+2)	Soriano 13', 39', 44', 54', 65'; Mané 20'; Sabitzer 22'; Ramalho (yellow card) 32'; Lazaro 74'	Report	Karner (yellow card) 48'; Tomi (yellow card) 61'	Stadium: Red Bull Arena; Attendance: 13,560; Referee: Robert Schörgenhofer

16 August 2014 5	Admira Wacker	0 – 3	Red Bull Salzburg	Maria Enzersdorf
19:00 CEST (UTC+2)	Toth (yellow card) 28'; Ebner (yellow card) 52'; Ouédraogo (yellow card) 52'; Zwierschitz (yellow card) 63'	Report	Bruno 24'; Schwegler 50'; Hinteregger (yellow card) 66'; Sabitzer 74'	Stadium: BSFZ-Arena; Attendance: 3,500; Referee: Dominik Ouschan

23 August 2014 6	Red Bull Salzburg	5 – 0	Rheindorf Altach	Wals-Siezenheim
19:00 CEST (UTC+2)	Soriano 12' (pen.); Bruno 16'; Alan 38', 77'; Lazaro 90+4'	Report	Roth (yellow card) 11' (yellow-red card) 90'; Gërçaliu (yellow card) 47'; Netzer (yellow card) 69'	Stadium: Red Bull Arena; Attendance: 8,670; Referee: Andreas Kollegger

30 August 2014 7	Red Bull Salzburg	2 – 3	Sturm Graz	Wals-Siezenheim
16:30 CEST (UTC+2)	Ramalho (yellow card) 20'; Soriano (yellow card) 29' (goal) 55'; Leitgeb (yellow card) 29'; Kampl 36'; Ilsanker (yellow card) 65'	Report	Stanković 4', 14' (yellow card) 80'; Beichler (yellow card) 42'; Hadžić (yellow card) 73'; Djuricin (yellow card) 76' (goal) 90'; Klem (yellow card) 78'; Madl (yellow card) 83'	Stadium: Red Bull Arena; Attendance: 8,359; Referee: Markus Hameter

14 September 2014 8	Wolfsberger AC	1 – 0	Red Bull Salzburg	Klagenfurt
16:30 CEST (UTC+2)	Trdina 26'; Rnić (yellow card) 36'; Wernitznig (red card) 45'; Žulj (yellow card) 81'	Report	Ramalho (yellow card) 65'; Hinteregger (yellow card) 77'	Stadium: Wörthersee Stadion; Attendance: 19,250; Referee: Harald Lechner

21 September 2014 9	Red Bull Salzburg	2 – 3	Austria Wien	Wals-Siezenheim
16:30 CEST (UTC+2)	Alan 31', 68'; Hinteregger (yellow card) 43' (yellow-red card) 49'	Report	Mader (yellow card) 14'; Holland (yellow card) 27'; Meilinger 34' de Paula 38'; Damari 86'	Stadium: Red Bull Arena; Attendance: 13,750; Referee: Manuel Schüttengruber

28 September 2014 10	Rapid Wien	1 – 2	Red Bull Salzburg	Vienna
15:30 CEST (UTC+2)	Wydra (yellow card) 69'; Schwab (yellow card) 77'; Prosenik 90+4'	Report	Ramalho (yellow card) 28'; Ilsanker (yellow card) 48'; Bruno 84'; Alan 89'	Stadium: Gerhard Hanappi Stadium; Attendance: 25,300; Referee: René Eisner

5 October 2014 11	Red Bull Salzburg	4 – 1	Wiener Neustadt	Wals-Siezenheim
19:00 CEST (UTC+2)	Ankersen 3'; Sabitzer 22'; Lazaro (yellow card) 45'; Soriano 78'; Kampl 85'	Report	Rauter 32'; Prettenthaler (yellow card) 46'; Schierl (yellow card) 76'	Stadium: Red Bull Arena; Attendance: 7,214; Referee: Gerhard Grobelnik

18 October 2014 12	Red Bull Salzburg	4 – 2	SV Ried	Wals-Siezenheim
16:00 CEST (UTC+2)	Soriano 13', 45' (penalty missed) 65'; Sabitzer 84', 90+4'	Report	Perstaller (yellow card) 18'; Thomalla 43'; Pichler (yellow card) 54'; Walch 62'; Ziegl (yellow card) 64'	Stadium: Red Bull Arena; Attendance: 13,846; Referee: Andreas Kollegger

26 October 2014 13	SV Grödig	2 – 2	Red Bull Salzburg	Grödig
16:30 CET (UTC+1)	Reyna 7'; Huspek 37' (pen.); Potzmann (yellow card) 49'; Martschinko (yellow card) 82'; Strobl (yellow card) 90+3'	Report	Kampl 22'; Gulácsi (red card) 34'; Lazaro (yellow card) 60'; Ramalho (yellow card) 62'; Leitgeb (yellow card) 75'; Sabitzer 81'	Stadium: Untersberg-Arena; Attendance: 3,200; Referee: Harald Lechner

1 November 2014 14	Red Bull Salzburg	2 – 0	Admira Wacker	Wals-Siezenheim
18:30 CET (UTC+1)	Soriano 3', 40'; Ankersen (yellow card) 51'; Hinteregger (yellow card) 89'	Report	Schösswendter (yellow card) 65'; Wessely (red card) 65'; Thürauer (yellow card) 90'	Stadium: Red Bull Arena; Attendance: 7,412; Referee: René Eisner

9 November 2014 15	Rheindorf Altach	4 – 1	Red Bull Salzburg	Altach
17:00 CET (UTC+1)	Aigner 4'; Tajouri-Shradi 62'; Prokopič (yellow card) 64'; Kovačec 81'; Ngwat-Mahop 84'	Report	Bruno 53'; Schiemer (yellow card) 73'; Sabitzer (yellow card) 87'	Stadium: Stadion Schnabelholz; Attendance: 8,300; Referee: Christian Dintar

23 November 2014 16	Sturm Graz	2 – 1	Red Bull Salzburg	Graz
16:30 CET (UTC+1)	Djuricin (yellow card) 31' (goal) 80'; Offenbacher (yellow card) 41'; Spendlhofer (yellow card) 56'; Rosenberger (yellow card) 81'	Report	Bruno 8'; Soriano 52'	Stadium: UPC Arena; Attendance: 11,658; Referee: Harald Lechner

30 November 2014 17	Red Bull Salzburg	2 – 2	Wolfsberger AC	Wals-Siezenheim
16:30 CET (UTC+1)	Kampl (yellow card) 24'; Ramalho (yellow card) 29'; Alan (yellow card) 84'; Soriano 87' (pen.), 90+1' (pen.); Schwegler (yellow card) 89'	Report	Wernitznig 28'; Hüttenbrenner (yellow card) 33'; Weber (yellow card) 58'; Putsche 66'; Kofler (yellow card) 90'; Silvio (yellow card) 90+2'	Stadium: Red Bull Arena; Attendance: 9,616; Referee: Robert Schörgenhofer

6 December 2014 18	Austria Wien	2 – 4	Red Bull Salzburg	Vienna
16:00 CET (UTC+1)	Gorgon 7'; Grünwald 20' (yellow card) 50'; Salamon (yellow card) 52' (yellow-red card) 82'; Rotpuller (yellow card) 54'; Damari (yellow card) 90'	Report	Ilsanker (yellow card) 36'; Alan 52', 58', 60'; Sabitzer 68'	Stadium: Generali Arena; Attendance: 9,172; Referee: Alexander Harkam

14 December 2014 19	Red Bull Salzburg	1 – 2	Rapid Wien	Wals-Siezenheim
16:30 CET (UTC+1)	Ramalho (yellow card) 6' (yellow-red card) 23'; Leitgeb (yellow card) 34'; Schwegler (yellow card) 43'; Hinteregger (yellow card) 54'; Sabitzer 84' (yellow card) 90'	Report	Wydra (yellow card) 10'; Kainz (yellow card) 66'; Berić 80', 90+4'	Stadium: Red Bull Arena; Attendance: 17,000; Referee: Markus Hameter

14 February 2015 20	Wiener Neustadt	0 – 2	Red Bull Salzburg	Wiener Neustadt
18:30 CET (UTC+1)		Report	Soriano 50', 67'; Ilsanker (yellow card) 56'; Ćaleta-Car (yellow card) 79'	Stadium: Stadion Wiener Neustadt; Attendance: 2,200; Referee: Harald Lechner

22 February 2015 21	SV Ried	2 – 2	Red Bull Salzburg	Ried im Innkreis
14:00 CET (UTC+1)	Filipović (yellow card) 31'; Thomalla 52', 65'; Lainer (yellow card) 55'	Report	Pires 33'; Ankersen (yellow card) 64'; Keïta 68'; Schmitz (yellow card) 79'	Stadium: Keine Sorgen Arena; Attendance: 4,700; Referee: Gerhard Grobelnik

1 March 2015 22	Red Bull Salzburg	3 – 1	SV Grödig	Wals-Siezenheim
16:30 CET (UTC+1)	Sabitzer 1', 78'; Ilsanker (yellow card) 50'; Keïta 59'; Ankersen (red card) 81'	Report	Tomi 40'; Strobl (yellow card) 42' (yellow-red card) 85'; Cabrera (yellow card) 79'	Stadium: Red Bull Arena; Attendance: 6,980; Referee: Dominik Ouschan

4 March 2015 23	Admira Wacker	1 – 4	Red Bull Salzburg	Maria Enzersdorf
19:00 CET (UTC+1)	Lackner (yellow card) 28'; Schicker (penalty missed) 51' 89'	Report	Sabitzer 11' (red card) 22'; Minamino 38', 69'; Laimer (yellow card) 45+1'; Lazaro (yellow card) 48'; Gulácsi (yellow card) 50'; Ćaleta-Car (yellow card) 52'; Ramalho (yellow card) 72'; Berisha 90+1'	Stadium: BSFZ-Arena; Attendance: 2,350; Referee: Manuel Schüttengruber

7 March 2015 24	Red Bull Salzburg	0 – 1	Rheindorf Altach	Wals-Siezenheim
18:30 CEST (UTC+2)	Ilsanker (yellow card) 18'; Ćaleta-Car (yellow card) 37'; Soriano (penalty missed) 83'	Report	Jäger (yellow card) 6'; Netzer (yellow card) 48'; Tajouri-Shradi 50'	Stadium: Red Bull Arena; Attendance: 6,898; Referee: Dieter Muckenhammer

15 March 2015 25	Red Bull Salzburg	2 – 1	Sturm Graz	Wals-Siezenheim
16:30 CET (UTC+1)	Djuricin 12'; Laimer (yellow card) 70'; Soriano 76'; Schwegler (yellow card) 77'	Report	Piesinger 23'; Offenbacher (yellow card) 48'; Madl (yellow card) 72'	Stadium: Red Bull Arena; Attendance: 9,600; Referee: Oliver Drachta

21 March 2015 26	Wolfsberger AC	3 – 2	Red Bull Salzburg	Wolfsberg
19:30 CEST (UTC+2)	Jacobo 8'; Weber (yellow card) 26'; Silvio 45'; Kerhe 90+3'	Report	Sabitzer (yellow card) 24'; Soriano 27', 41'; Keïta (yellow card) 76'; Schwegler (yellow card) 82'	Stadium: Lavanttal-Arena; Attendance: 3,579; Referee: Gerhard Grobelnik

4 April 2015 27	Red Bull Salzburg	3 – 1	Austria Wien	Wals-Siezenheim
16:00 CEST (UTC+2)	Sabitzer 1'; Lazaro 23', 74'; Ilsanker (yellow card) 48'; Schmitz (yellow card) 60'; Keïta (yellow card) 71'; Ramalho (yellow card) 90+2'; Soriano (yellow card) 90+5'	Report	de Paula 6'; Rotpuller (yellow card) 85'; Suttner (yellow card) 90+5'; Ortlechner (yellow card) 90+6'	Stadium: Red Bull Arena; Attendance: 11,376; Referee: Dominik Ouschan

12 April 2015 28	Rapid Wien	3 – 3	Red Bull Salzburg	Vienna
18:00 CEST (UTC+2)	Pavelić (yellow card) 42' (yellow-red card) 80'; Berić 51'; Schobesberger 59'; Prosenik 90+2'	Report	Berisha 3'; Soriano 18'; Sabitzer 32' (yellow card) 67'; Ulmer (red card) 44'; Lazaro (yellow card) 70'; Keïta (yellow card) 72'; Gulácsi (yellow card) 90'	Stadium: Gerhard Hanappi Stadium; Attendance: 26,800; Referee: René Eisner

18 April 2015 29	Red Bull Salzburg	6 – 0	Wiener Neustadt	Wals-Siezenheim
18:30 CEST (UTC+2)	Keïta 28'; Berisha 32'; Soriano 61', 67'; Sabitzer 66'; Hinteregger 90+3'	Report		Stadium: Red Bull Arena; Attendance: 7,045; Referee: Julian Weinberger

25 April 2015 30	Red Bull Salzburg	2 – 1	SV Ried	Wals-Siezenheim
16:00 CEST (UTC+2)	Keïta 15'; Soriano 40'	Report	Perstaller 72'	Stadium: Red Bull Arena; Attendance: 9,687; Referee: Alexander Harkam

2 May 2015 31	SV Grödig	0 – 3	Red Bull Salzburg	Grödig
18:30 CEST (UTC+2)	Tomi (yellow card) 58'; Stankovic (yellow card) 60'; Potzmann (yellow card) 60'	Report	Soriano 24', 59' (pen.) (yellow card) 50'; Ramalho (yellow card) 87'; Minamino 90+1'	Stadium: Untersberg-Arena; Attendance: 2,731; Referee: Markus Hameter

9 May 2015 32	Red Bull Salzburg	4 – 0	Admira Wacker	Wals-Siezenheim
18:30 CEST (UTC+2)	Soriano 12'; Ulmer 33'; Schmitz (yellow card) 47'; Sabitzer 67', 68'	Report	Windbichler (yellow card) 61'	Stadium: Red Bull Arena; Attendance: 8,459; Referee: Stephan Klossner

16 May 2015 33	Rheindorf Altach	2 – 2	Red Bull Salzburg	Altach
16:00 CEST (UTC+2)	Aigner 27', 75' (pen.); Bodul (yellow card) 51'; Ortiz (yellow card) 70'; Seeger (yellow card) 80'	Report	Berisha 1'; Hinteregger (red card) 74'; Schwegler (yellow card) 74'; Sabitzer 86'	Stadium: Stadion Schnabelholz; Attendance: 6,017; Referee: Manuel Schüttengruber

20 May 2015 34	Sturm Graz	0 – 0	Red Bull Salzburg	Graz
20:30 CEST (UTC+2)	Schloffer (yellow card) 54'; Madl (yellow card) 60'; Avdijaj (yellow card) 73'; Piesinger (yellow card) 85'	Report	Ilsanker (yellow card) 48'; Minamino (yellow card) 69'; Berisha (yellow card) 78'	Stadium: UPC Arena; Attendance: 12,064; Referee: Gerhard Grobelnik

24 May 2015 35	Red Bull Salzburg	3 – 0	Wolfsberger AC	Wals-Siezenheim
17:45 CEST (UTC+2)	Sabitzer 5'; Ramalho 12'; Soriano 51'; Hinteregger (yellow card) 59'	Report	Oussalé (yellow card) 51'	Stadium: Red Bull Arena; Attendance: 18,200; Referee: Dominik Ouschan

31 May 2015 36	Austria Wien	1 – 1	Red Bull Salzburg	Vienna
16:30 CEST (UTC+2)	Mader (yellow card) 6'; Grünwald (yellow card) 43'; Zulechner 69'; Ramsebner (yellow card) 78'	Report	Schmitz (yellow card) 24'; Minamino (yellow card) 32'; Djuricin 76'	Stadium: Generali Arena; Attendance: 8,505; Referee: Andreas Kollegger

=== Austrian Cup ===
12 July 2014 First Round	Sollenau	1 – 10	Red Bull Salzburg	Sollenau
16:00 CEST (UTC+2)	Vukovič 38'; J.Csandl (yellow card) 78'	Report	Mané 19'; Alan 24', 36', 62', 70'; Soriano 31', 35'; Ilsanker (yellow card) 54'; Sabitzer 81', 89'; Ulmer 87'	Stadium: Sportplatz Sollenau; Attendance: 2,100; Referee: Julian Weinberger

24 September 2014 Second Round	Wiener Sport-Club	1 – 12	Red Bull Salzburg	Vienna
20:30 CEST (UTC+2)	Pollack 32'; Kostić (yellow card) 47'	Report	Sabitzer 6', 37'; Soriano 21', 75'; Alan 35', 53', 55'; Kampl 60'; Leitgeb 72'; Bruno 80'; Quaschner 86'; Soura 88' (o.g.)	Stadium: Sportclub-Platz; Attendance: 6,224; Referee: Christian Dintar

29 October 2014 Round of 16	Wacker Innsbruck	1 – 2 (a.e.t.)	Red Bull Salzburg	Innsbruck
18:00 CET (UTC+1)	Säumel (yellow card) 94'; Kofler (yellow card) 104'; Đokić (yellow card) 105'; Bergmann 107'	Report	Bruno (yellow card) 74'; Kampl 97'; Roguljić 108'	Stadium: Tivoli-Neu; Attendance: 3,000; Referee: Dominik Ouschan

8 April 2015 Quarterfinal	SCR Altach	0 – 4	Red Bull Salzburg	Altach
19:30 CEST (UTC+2)	Pöllhuber (yellow card) 16'; Tajouri-Shradi (yellow card) 52'; Salomon (yellow card) 61'; Jäger (yellow card) 63'; César (yellow card) 76'; Aigner (red card) 85'	Report	Sabitzer 4', 32'; Schmitz (yellow card) 21'; Soriano 34', 79'; Schwegler (yellow card) 44'; Hinteregger (red card) 49'	Stadium: Stadion Schnabelholz; Attendance: 6,147; Referee: Manuel Schüttengruber

28 April 2015 Semifinal	SV Grödig	0 – 2	Red Bull Salzburg	Grödig
18:00 CEST (UTC+2)	Strobl (yellow card) 16'; Nutz (yellow card) 72'; Maak (yellow card) 81'; Handle (yellow card) 84'	Report	Ilsanker (yellow card) 53'; Quaschner 74'; Sabitzer 78'	Stadium: Untersberg-Arena; Attendance: 1,890; Referee: Harald Lechner

==== Final ====
3 June 2015	Austria Wien	0 – 2 (a.e.t.)	Red Bull Salzburg	Klagenfurt
19:30 CEST (UTC+2)	Ramsebner (yellow card) 66'; Holland (yellow card) 87'; Grünwald (yellow card) 90'; Rotpuller (yellow card) 118' (yellow-red card) 120+2'	Report	Gulácsi (red card) 43'; Ramalho (yellow card) 90'; Schmitz (yellow card) 93'; Soriano 95'; Pires 108' (yellow card) 109'	Stadium: Wörthersee Stadion; Attendance: 16,200; Referee: Oliver Drachta

=== UEFA Champions League ===
==== Qualifying rounds ====
30 July 2014 3rd qualifying round 1st leg	Qarabağ (Azerbaijan)	2 – 1	(Austria) Red Bull Salzburg	Baku, Azerbaijan
17:30 CEST (UTC+2)	Dias 2'; Richard (yellow card) 32'; Teli (yellow card) 40' (yellow-red card) 42'; Garayev (yellow card) 43'; Guseynov (yellow card) 55'; Reynaldo 86' (red card) 88'	Report	Leitgeb (yellow card) 31'; Schwegler (red card) 34'; Hinteregger (yellow card) 59'; Soriano 77'; Kampl (yellow card) 90+2'	Stadium: Tofiq Bahramov Stadium; Attendance: 31,000; Referee: Serhiy Boyko (Ukraine)
Note: Qarabağ have played their home games at the Tofiq Bahramov Stadium since 1993 due to the ongoing situation in Quzanlı.

6 August 2014 3rd qualifying round 2nd leg	Red Bull Salzburg (Austria)	2 – 0 (3 – 2 agg.)	(Azerbaijan) Qarabağ	Wals-Siezenheim, Austria
20:30 CEST (UTC+2)	Hinteregger 18', 34'	Report	Medvedev (yellow card) 32'; Dias (yellow card) 36'; Yusifov (yellow card) 88'	Stadium: Red Bull Arena; Attendance: 20,716; Referee: Bobby Madden (Scotland)

19 August 2014 Playoff round 1st leg	Red Bull Salzburg (Austria)	2 – 1	(Sweden) Malmö	Wals-Siezenheim, Austria
20:45 CEST (UTC+2)	Schiemer 16'; Soriano 54'; Ilsanker (yellow card) 70'	Report	E.Johansson (yellow card) 5'; Adu (yellow card) 45+1'; Helander (yellow card) 56'; Eriksson (yellow card) 63'; Forsberg 90'; Halsti (yellow card) 90+4'	Stadium: Red Bull Arena; Attendance: 29,110; Referee: Nicola Rizzoli (Italy)

27 August 2014 Playoff round 2nd leg	Malmö (Sweden)	3 – 0 (4 – 2 agg.)	(Austria) Red Bull Salzburg	Malmö, Sweden
20:45 CEST (UTC+2)	Rosenberg 11' (pen.), 84'; Eriksson 19'; Konate (yellow card) 70'	Report	Keïta (yellow card) 31'; Leitgeb (yellow card) 58'; Kampl (yellow card) 63'	Stadium: Swedbank Stadion; Attendance: 20,361; Referee: Damir Skomina (Slovenia)

=== UEFA Europa League ===
==== Group stage ====
Pos	Team	Pld	W	D	L	GF	GA	GD	Pts	Qualification	SAL	CEL	DZG	AG
1	(Austria) Red Bull Salzburg	6	5	1	0	21	8	+13	16	Advance to knockout phase	—	2–2	4–2	5–1
2	(Scotland) Celtic	6	2	2	2	10	11	−1	8	Advance to knockout phase	1–3	—	1–0	2–1
3	(Croatia) Dinamo Zagreb	6	2	0	4	12	15	−3	6		1–5	4–3	—	5–1
4	(Romania) Astra Giurgiu	6	1	1	4	6	15	−9	4		1–2	1–1	1–0	—

Source: Soccerway

18 September 2014 1	Red Bull Salzburg (Austria)	2 – 2	(Scotland) Celtic	Wals-Siezenheim, Austria
19:00 CEST (UTC+2)	Ulmer (yellow card) 10'; Alan 36'; Soriano 78'; Hinteregger (yellow card) 90+1'	Report	Wakaso 14'; Ambrose (yellow card) 20'; Brown (yellow card) 39' (goal) 60'	Stadium: Red Bull Arena; Attendance: 17,886; Referee: Artur Soares Dias (Portugal)

2 October 2014 2	Astra Giurgiu (Romania)	1 – 2	(Austria) Red Bull Salzburg	Giurgiu, Romania
21:05 CEST (UTC+2)	Seto 15'; Budescu (yellow card) 75'; Youssef (yellow card) 83'	Report	Kampl 36'; Soriano 42'; Ulmer (yellow card) 48'; Sabitzer (yellow card) 62'; Lazaro (yellow card) 72'	Stadium: Stadionul Marin Anastasovici; Attendance: =3,298; Referee: Libor Kovařík (Czech Republic)

23 October 2014 3	Red Bull Salzburg (Austria)	4 – 2	(Croatia) Dinamo Zagreb	Wals-Siezenheim, Austria
21:05 CEST (UTC+2)	Alan 14', 45', 52'; Ramalho 49'; Ilsanker (yellow card) 90+5'	Report	Sigali (yellow card) 44'; Ademi 81'; Vukojević (yellow card) 82'; Henríquez 89'	Stadium: Red Bull Arena; Attendance: 12,872; Referee: Serdar Gözübüyük (Netherlands)

6 November 2014 4	Dinamo Zagreb (Croatia)	1 – 5	(Austria) Red Bull Salzburg	Zagreb, Croatia
19:00 CET (UTC+1)	Pinto (yellow card) 15'; Brozović (yellow card) 51'; Henríquez 60'; Ademi (yellow card) 76'; Šimunović (yellow card) 80'	Report	Soriano 39', 64', 85'; Kampl 59'; Bruno 72'; Ilsanker (yellow card) 50'; Ulmer (yellow card) 52'; Laimer (yellow card) 87'	Stadium: Stadion Maksimir; Attendance: 10,769; Referee: Michael Koukoulakis (Greece)

27 November 2014 5	Celtic (Scotland)	1 – 3	(Austria) Red Bull Salzburg	Glasgow, Scotland
21:05 CET (UTC+1)	Johansen 30' (yellow card) 34'	Report	Alan 8', 13'; Schmitz (yellow card) 39'; Keïta 90+2'	Stadium: Celtic Park; Attendance: =32,414; Referee: Halis Özkahya (Turkey)

11 December 2014 6	Red Bull Salzburg (Austria)	5 – 1	(Romania) Astra Giurgiu	Wals-Siezenheim, Austria
19:00 CET (UTC+1)	Sabitzer 9' (yellow card) 55'; Kampl 34', 90+2'; Alan 46', 70'; Schmitz (yellow card) 67'; Schwegler (yellow card) 83'	Report	Florescu 51'; Chițu (yellow card) 53'	Stadium: Red Bull Arena; Attendance: 8,258; Referee: Paweł Raczkowski (Poland)

==== Knockout phase ====
19 February 2015 Round of 32 1st leg	Villarreal (Spain)	2 – 1	(Austria) Red Bull Salzburg	Villarreal, Spain
19:00 CET (UTC+1)	Uche 32'; Pina (yellow card) 38'; Cheryshev 54'; Campbell (yellow card) 85'; Costa (yellow card) 90+3'	Report	Ilsanker (yellow card) 18'; Soriano 48' (pen.); Schwegler (yellow card) 53'; Ramalho (yellow card) 75'	Stadium: Estadio de la Cerámica; Attendance: 12,532; Referee: Bobby Madden (Scotland)

26 February 2015 Round of 32 2nd leg	Red Bull Salzburg (Austria)	1 – 3 (2 – 5 agg.)	(Spain) Villarreal	Wals-Siezenheim, Austria
21:05 CET (UTC+1)	Djuricin 18'; Hinteregger (yellow card) 49'; Schwegler (yellow card) 66'	Report	Vietto 33', 76'; Musacchio (yellow card) 33'; Pina (yellow card) 34'; Trigueros (yellow card) 56'; G.dos Santos 79'; J.dos Santos (yellow card) 85'	Stadium: Red Bull Arena; Attendance: 26,020; Referee: Kenn Hansen (Denmark)

== Statistics ==
As of match played 3 June 2015

=== Appearances and goals ===
No.	Pos	Nat	Player	Total		Bundesliga		Austrian Cup		UEFA Champions League		UEFA Europa League	
No.	Pos	Nat	Player	Apps	Goals	Apps	Goals	Apps	Goals	Apps	Goals	Apps	Goals
2	DF	(Germany) GER	Benno Schmitz	28	0	16+5	0	5	0	0	0	2	0
4	DF	(Denmark) DEN	Peter Ankersen	33	1	15+6	1	3+1	0	1+2	0	4+1	0
5	DF	(Brazil) BRA	André Ramalho	47	2	24+7	1	5	0	4	0	7	1
6	DF	(Switzerland) SUI	Christian Schwegler	31	2	18+3	2	2	0	3	0	3+2	0
7	MF	(Austria) AUT	Marcel Sabitzer	51	27	26+7	19	5+1	7	2+2	0	6+2	1
8	MF	(Guinea) GUI	Naby Keïta	44	6	25+5	5	4	0	2+2	0	3+3	1
9	FW	(Austria) AUT	Marco Djuricin	16	3	7+6	2	1	0	0	0	2	1
11	FW	(Brazil) BRA	Felipe Pires	11	2	2+5	1	0+2	1	0	0	0+2	0
13	MF	(Austria) AUT	Stefan Ilsanker	45	0	28+3	0	5	0	3	0	6	0
14	MF	(Norway) NOR	Valon Berisha	19	4	8+6	4	3	0	0	0	0+2	0
17	DF	(Austria) AUT	Andreas Ulmer	32	3	21	2	2	1	3	0	6	0
18	FW	(Japan) JPN	Takumi Minamino	17	3	9+5	3	2	0	0	0	1	0
24	MF	(Austria) AUT	Christoph Leitgeb	31	1	17+1	0	2+1	1	4	0	6	0
26	FW	(Spain) ESP	Jonathan Soriano	49	46	29+3	31	5	7	4	2	7+1	6
28	DF	(Denmark) DEN	Asger Sørensen	1	0	1	0	0	0	0	0	0	0
31	GK	(Hungary) HUN	Péter Gulácsi	50	0	34	0	5	0	4	0	7	0
33	GK	(Germany) GER	Alexander Walke	6	0	2+1	0	1+1	0	0	0	1	0
36	DF	(Austria) AUT	Martin Hinteregger	48	3	31	1	6	0	3	2	8	0
37	MF	(Austria) AUT	Valentino Lazaro	32	4	17+8	4	2+2	0	0+1	0	1+1	0
41	MF	(Austria) AUT	Konrad Laimer	13	0	5+3	0	0+2	0	0	0	2+1	0
42	FW	(Germany) GER	Nils Quaschner	15	2	2+8	0	0+3	2	0+1	0	0+1	0
44	MF	(Croatia) CRO	Ante Roguljić	2	1	1	0	0+1	1	0	0	0	0
45	DF	(Croatia) CRO	Duje Ćaleta-Car	9	0	7	0	1	0	0	0	1	0
46	FW	(Bosnia and Herzegovina) BIH	Smail Prevljak	1	0	0+1	0	0	0	0	0	0	0
47	DF	(Austria) AUT	Lukas Gugganig	1	0	0+1	0	0	0	0	0	0	0
77	MF	(Belgium) BEL	Massimo Bruno	39	8	13+11	6	1+3	1	1+3	0	4+3	1
Players away on loan :
Players who left Red Bull Salzburg during the season:
10	FW	(Senegal) SEN	Sadio Mané	8	3	4	2	1	1	3	0	0	0
15	DF	(Austria) AUT	Franz Schiemer	10	2	5+1	1	1	0	1	1	0+2	0
27	FW	(Brazil) BRA	Alan	26	24	13+3	9	2	7	2+1	0	5	8
44	MF	(Slovenia) SLO	Kevin Kampl	31	11	16+2	5	2+1	2	4	0	6	4

=== Goal scorers ===
Place	Position	Nation	Number	Name	Bundesliga	Austrian Cup	UEFA Champions League	UEFA Europa League	Total
1	FW	(Spain)	26	Jonathan Soriano	31	7	2	6	46
2	MF	(Austria)	7	Marcel Sabitzer	19	7	0	1	27
3	FW	(Brazil)	27	Alan Carvalho	9	7	0	8	24
4	MF	(Slovenia)	44	Kevin Kampl	5	2	0	4	11
5	MF	(Belgium)	77	Massimo Bruno	6	1	0	1	8
6	MF	(Guinea)	8	Naby Keïta	5	0	0	1	6
7	MF	(Norway)	14	Valon Berisha	4	0	0	0	4
7	MF	(Austria)	37	Valentino Lazaro	4	0	0	0	4
9	FW	(Japan)	18	Takumi Minamino	3	0	0	0	3
9	DF	(Austria)	17	Andreas Ulmer	2	1	0	0	3
9	FW	(Senegal)	10	Sadio Mané	2	1	0	0	3
9	FW	(Austria)	9	Marco Djuricin	2	0	0	1	3
9	DF	(Austria)	36	Martin Hinteregger	1	0	2	0	3
14	DF	(Switzerland)	6	Christian Schwegler	2	0	0	0	2
14	FW	(Brazil)	11	Felipe Pires	1	1	0	0	2
14	DF	(Austria)	15	Franz Schiemer	1	0	1	0	2
14	DF	(Brazil)	5	André Ramalho	1	0	0	1	2
14	FW	(Germany)	42	Nils Quaschner	0	2	0	0	2
19	DF	(Denmark)	4	Peter Ankersen	1	0	0	0	1
19	MF	(Austria)	24	Christoph Leitgeb	0	1	0	0	1
19	MF	(Croatia)	44	Ante Roguljić	0	1	0	0	1
19				Own goal	0	1	0	0	1
				TOTALS	99	32	5	23	159

=== Clean sheets ===
Place	Position	Nation	Number	Name	Bundesliga	Austrian Cup	UEFA Champions League	UEFA Europa League	Total
1	GK	(Hungary)	31	Péter Gulácsi	12	3	1	0	16
2	GK	(Germany)	33	Alexander Walke	0	1	0	0	1
				TOTALS	12	3	1	0	16

Gulácsi & Walke both played in Salzburg's 2-0 victory over Austria Wien on 3 June 2015.

=== Disciplinary record ===
Number	Nation	Position	Name	Bundesliga		Austrian Cup		UEFA Champions League		UEFA Europa League		Total	
Number	Nation	Position	Name	Yellow card	Red card	Yellow card	Red card	Yellow card	Red card	Yellow card	Red card	Yellow card	Red card
2	(Germany)	DF	Benno Schmitz	4	0	0	0	0	0	0	0	4	0
4	(Denmark)	DF	Peter Ankersen	3	1	0	0	0	0	0	0	3	1
5	(Brazil)	DF	André Ramalho	12	1	1	0	0	0	1	0	14	1
6	(Switzerland)	DF	Christian Schwegler	6	0	1	0	0	1	3	0	10	1
7	(Austria)	MF	Marcel Sabitzer	4	1	0	0	0	0	2	0	6	1
8	(Guinea)	MF	Naby Keïta	3	0	0	0	1	0	0	0	3	0
11	(Brazil)	FW	Felipe Pires	0	0	1	0	0	0	0	0	1	0
13	(Austria)	MF	Stefan Ilsanker	8	0	2	0	1	0	3	0	13	0
14	(Norway)	MF	Valon Berisha	1	0	0	0	0	0	0	0	1	0
17	(Austria)	DF	Andreas Ulmer	0	1	0	0	0	0	3	0	3	1
18	(Japan)	FW	Takumi Minamino	2	0	0	0	0	0	0	0	2	0
24	(Austria)	MF	Christoph Leitgeb	3	0	0	0	2	0	0	0	5	0
26	(Spain)	FW	Jonathan Soriano	3	0	0	0	0	0	0	0	3	0
31	(Hungary)	GK	Péter Gulácsi	2	1	0	1	0	0	0	0	2	2
36	(Austria)	DF	Martin Hinteregger	7	2	0	1	1	0	2	0	9	3
37	(Austria)	MF	Valentino Lazaro	4	0	0	0	0	0	1	0	5	0
41	(Austria)	MF	Konrad Laimer	2	0	0	0	0	0	1	0	3	0
45	(Croatia)	DF	Duje Ćaleta-Car	3	0	0	0	0	0	0	0	3	0
77	(Belgium)	MF	Massimo Bruno	0	0	1	0	0	0	0	0	1	0
Players away on loan:
Players who left Red Bull Salzburg during the season:
10	(Senegal)	FW	Sadio Mané	2	1	0	0	0	0	0	0	2	1
15	(Austria)	DF	Franz Schiemer	3	1	0	0	0	0	0	0	3	1
27	(Brazil)	FW	Alan Carvalho	2	0	0	0	0	0	0	0	2	0
44	(Slovenia)	MF	Kevin Kampl	3	0	0	0	2	0	0	0	5	0
			TOTALS	77	9	6	2	7	1	16	0	106	12
