= Lukas Gugganig =

Austrian footballer

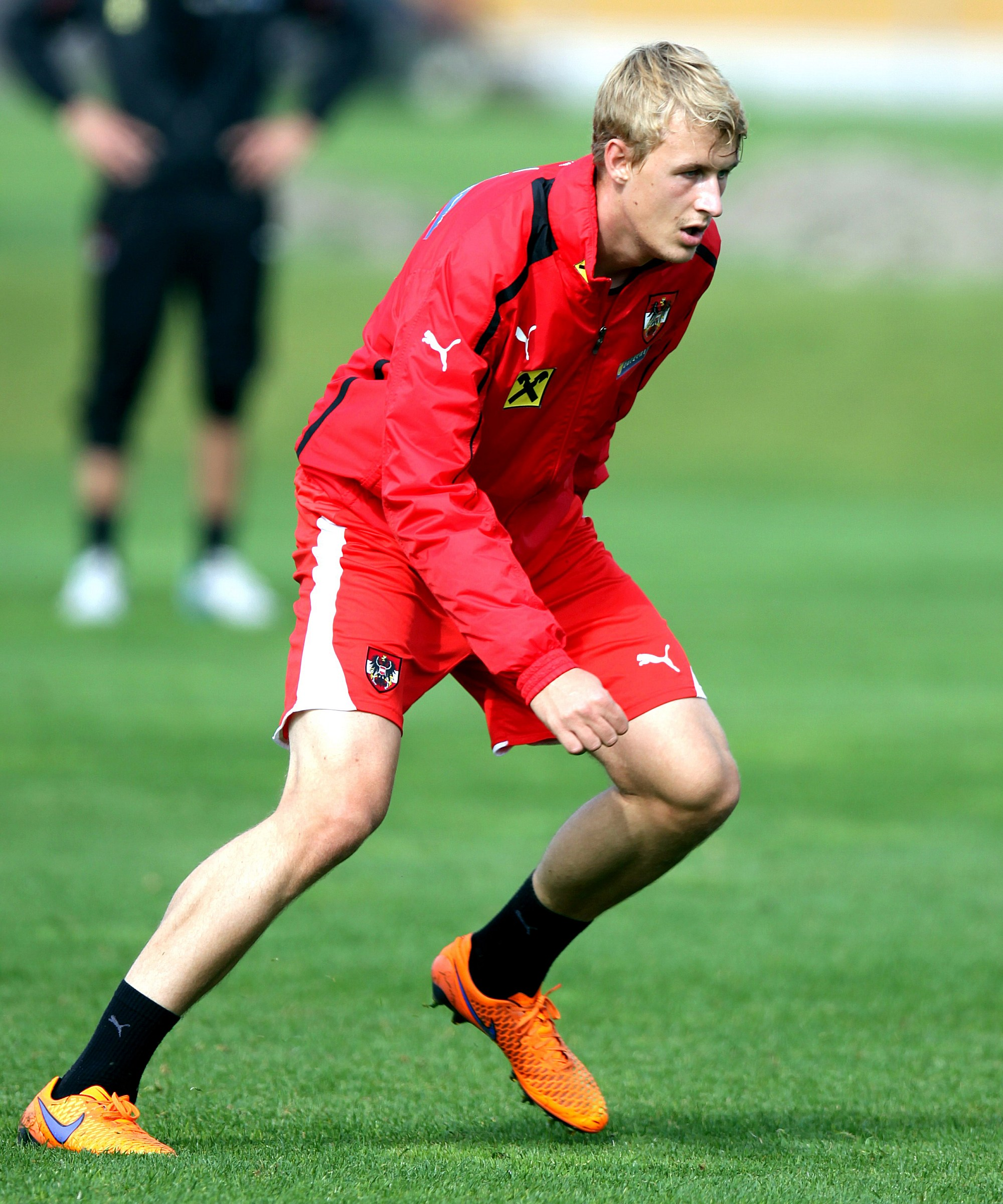
- Gugganig with the Austria U21 in 2015

Personal information
- Full name: Lukas Josef Gugganig
- Date of birth: 14 February 1995 (age 31)
- Place of birth: Spittal an der Drau, Austria
- Height: 1.91 m (6 ft 3 in)
- Position: Centre back

Youth career
- 2002–2009: SC Mühldorf
- 2009–2013: Red Bull Salzburg

Senior career*
Years	Team	Apps	(Gls)
2013–2015	FC Liefering	54	(7)
2015	Red Bull Salzburg	1	(0)
2015–2016	FSV Frankfurt	25	(2)
2016–2019	Greuther Fürth II	11	(0)
2016–2019	Greuther Fürth	51	(3)
2019–2022	VfL Osnabrück	78	(2)
2022–2026	SCR Altach	89	(6)

International career
2010	Austria U16	1	(0)
2011	Austria U17	2	(0)
2013	Austria U18	2	(0)
2013–2014	Austria U19	8	(0)
2015	Austria U20	6	(0)
2014–2016	Austria U21	11	(0)
- * Club domestic league appearances and goals as of 10 June 2026

Lukas Gugganig (born 14 February 1995) is an Austrian professional footballer who plays as a centre back. He has represented Austria international at youth levels Austria U16 through Austria U21.

== Personal life ==
His younger brother David Gugganig is also a footballer.

== Career statistics ==
As of match played 1 July 2021

Appearances and goals by club, season and competition
Club	Season	League			National Cup		Other		Total	
Club	Season	Division	Apps	Goals	Apps	Goals	Apps	Goals	Apps	Goals
FC Liefering	2013–14	Erste Liga	24	2	0	0	—		24	2
FC Liefering	2014–15	Erste Liga	30	5	0	0	—		30	5
FC Liefering	Total		54	7	0	0	0	0	54	7
FC Salzburg	2014–15	Bundesliga	1	0	0	0	0	0	1	0
FSV Frankfurt	2015–16	2. Bundesliga	25	2	1	0	—		26	2
Greuther Fürth II	2016–17	Regionalliga Bayern	6	0	—		4 (Note: Appearances in the Regionalliga relegation play-offs)	1	10	1
Greuther Fürth II	2017–18	Regionalliga Bayern	5	0	—		—		5	0
Greuther Fürth II	Total		11	0	—		4	1	15	1
Greuther Fürth	2016–17	2. Bundesliga	5	0	0	0	—		5	0
Greuther Fürth	2017–18	2. Bundesliga	26	1	0	0	—		26	1
Greuther Fürth	2018–19	2. Bundesliga	20	2	1	0	—		21	2
Greuther Fürth	Total		51	3	1	0	0	0	52	3
VfL Osnabrück	2019–20	2. Bundesliga	20	1	1	0	—		21	1
VfL Osnabrück	2020–21	3. Liga	27	0	1	0	—		28	0
VfL Osnabrück	Total		47	1	2	0	0	0	49	1
Career total			189	13	4	0	4	1	197	14
