= Kimmo Hovi =

Finnish footballer (born 1994)

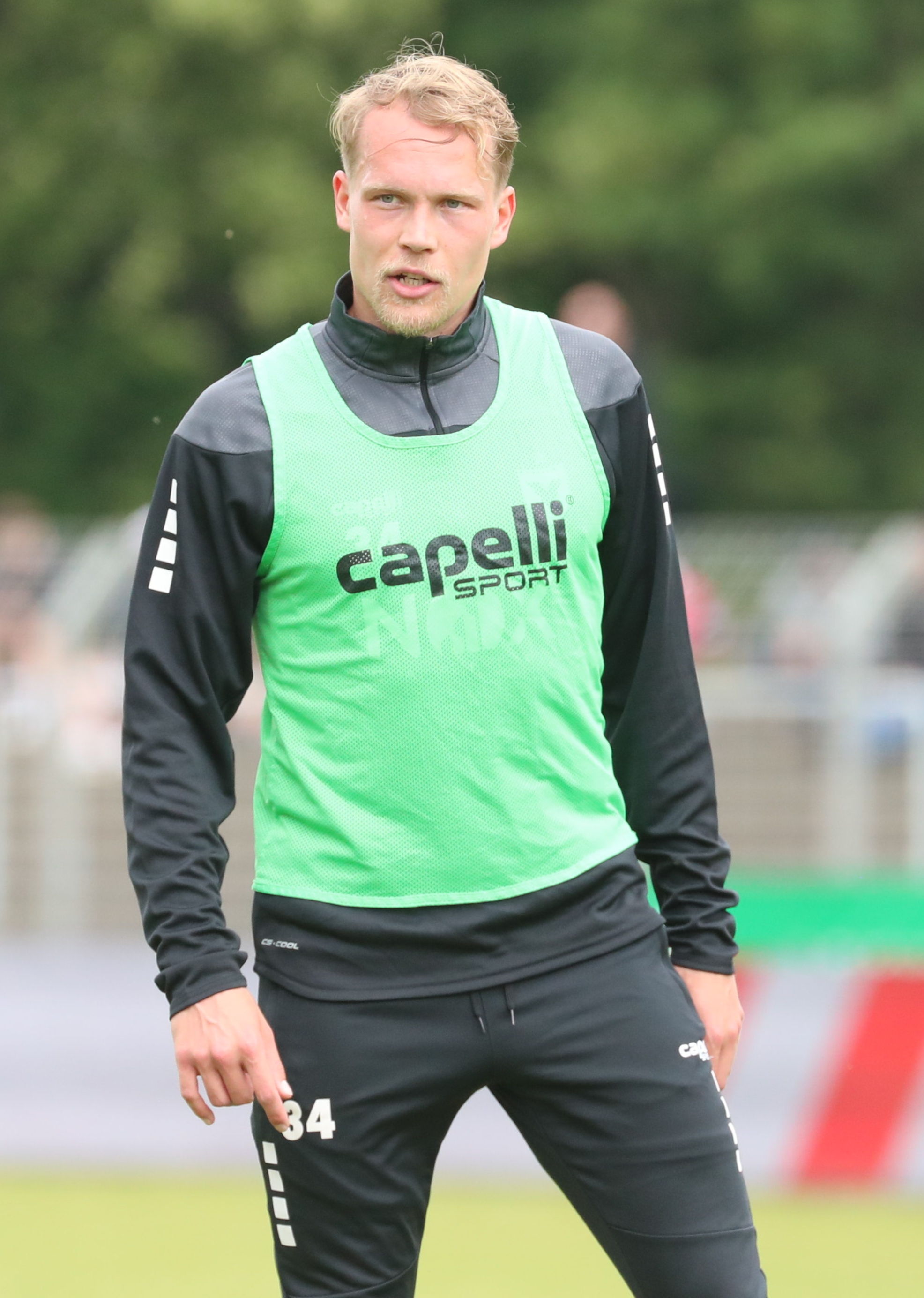
- Hovi in 2022

Personal information
- Full name: Kimmo Markku Hovi
- Date of birth: 31 May 1994 (age 32)
- Place of birth: Mäntsälä, Finland
- Height: 1.85 m (6 ft 1 in)
- Position: Forward

Youth career
- 2005–2007: MU
- 2008–2009: TuPS
- 2010–2012: PKKU

Senior career*
| Years | Team | Apps | (Gls) |
| 2012–2013 | PKKU | 32 | (19) |
| 2013 | → Melita (loan) | 5 | (0) |
| 2014 | FC Lahti | 11 | (1) |
| 2014 | → Kuusysi (loan) | 4 | (1) |
| 2015 | Avilés | 0 | (0) |
| 2015 | → Mérida (loan) | 1 | (0) |
| 2015–2016 | Portugalete | 17 | (1) |
| 2016–2018 | Inter Leipzig | 56 | (33) |
| 2018 | Chemnitzer FC | 10 | (1) |
| 2019–2020 | Union Fürstenwalde | 39 | (10) |
| 2020–2022 | Viktoria Berlin | 22 | (7) |
| 2022–2024 | Lübeck | 30 | (7) |

International career^{‡}
| 2013 | Finland U19 | 3 | (0) |
| 2014 | Finland U20 | 2 | (0) |
| 2014–2015 | Finland U21 | 10 | (1) |
Medal record
FC Lahti
| Third place | Veikkausliiga | 2014 |
Inter Leipzig
| Second place | NOFV-Oberliga | 2018 |
- * Club domestic league appearances and goals as of 14 May 2024 ‡ National team caps and goals as of 4 September 2015

Kimmo Hovi (born 31 May 1994) is a Finnish professional footballer who plays as a forward. He has also represented Finland U21 national team. He began his senior club career playing for PKKU at age 16 in 2012, before signing with FC Lahti in 2014. During his debut season he helped FC Lahti win bronze in the Veikkausliiga. Since then he has represented various clubs from Finland, Germany, Malta and Spain.

== Club career ==
=== PKKU ===
Hovi was born in Mäntsälä, Finland. He transferred to PKKU in 2010 and made his debut in Kakkonen during season 2012. Season 2013 was his break through when he scored 17 goals in 21 matches. After the season, he was loaned to Maltese Melita F.C.

=== FC Lahti ===
For the season 2014 he joined FC Lahti. During his first season on league level he made 11 appearances and scored one goal. He was also loaned for four matches to FC Kuusysi.

=== Real Avilés ===
In January 2015 it was announced that Hovi would join Spanish Real Avilés. He did not gain any appearances in the team and was loaned to Mérida AD.

=== Portugalete ===
For season 2015–16 Hovi played for Spanish Segunda División B club Portugalete.

=== Inter Leipzig ===
In August 2016 it was announced that Hovi would join German team Inter Leipzig.

=== Chemnitzer ===
After two successful seasons in Leipzig he was picked by Chemnitzer FC.

=== Union Fürstenwalde ===
Unsatisfied with his playtime in Chemnitzer he joined Union Fürstenwalde on 16 January 2019.

=== Viktoria Berlin ===
On 11 May 2020, Hovi joined Regionalliga Nordost club Viktoria Berlin, signing a two-year deal.

=== Lübeck ===
After two seasons in Berlin Hovi signed a deal with Lübeck.

== International career ==
Hovi made his debut in international football on 23 March 2013 at the age 18 in a match between Finland U19 and Austria U19.

Hovi made his debut for the Finland U21 national team and his only goal on 9 September 2014 in a 5–0 away victory UEFA European Under-21 Championship qualification match against San Marino. He gained his second cap in the UEFA European U-21 Championship qualifications in Arto Tolsa Areena, Kotka on 4 September 2015 in a match against Russia.

== Career statistics ==
=== Club ===
As of 14 May 2024

Appearances and goals by club, season and competition
| Club | Season | League | | | National Cups | | Europe | | Total | |
| Club | Season | Division | Apps | Goals | Apps | Goals | Apps | Goals | Apps | Goals |
|---|---|---|---|---|---|---|---|---|---|---|
| PKKU | 2012 | Kolmonen | 11 | 0 | 0 | 0 | — | | 11 | 0 |
| PKKU | 2013 | Kakkonen | 21 | 19 | 0 | 0 | — | | 21 | 19 |
| PKKU | Total | | 32 | 19 | 0 | 0 | 0 | 0 | 32 | 19 |
| Melita (loan) | 2013–14 | Maltese First Division | 5 | 0 | 0 | 0 | — | | 5 | 0 |
| VPS | 2014 | Veikkausliiga | 0 | 0 | 1 | 0 | — | | 1 | 0 |
| FC Lahti | 2014 | Veikkausliiga | 11 | 1 | 1 | 0 | — | | 12 | 1 |
| Kuusysi (loan) | 2014 | Kakkonen | 4 | 1 | 0 | 0 | — | | 4 | 1 |
| Real Avilés | 2014–15 | Segunda División B | 0 | 0 | 0 | 0 | — | | 0 | 0 |
| Mérida (loan) | 2014–15 | Tercera División | 1 | 0 | 0 | 0 | — | | 1 | 0 |
| Portugalete | 2015–16 | Segunda División B | 17 | 1 | 0 | 0 | — | | 17 | 1 |
| Inter Leipzig | 2016–17 | NOFV-Oberliga Süd | 28 | 10 | 0 | 0 | — | | 28 | 10 |
| Inter Leipzig | 2017–18 | NOFV-Oberliga Süd | 28 | 23 | 4 | 2 | — | | 32 | 25 |
| Inter Leipzig | Total | | 56 | 33 | 4 | 2 | 0 | 0 | 60 | 37 |
| Chemnitzer FC | 2018–19 | Regionalliga Nordost | 10 | 1 | 2 | 0 | — | | 12 | 1 |
| Union Fürstenwalde | 2018–19 | Regionalliga Nordost | 14 | 0 | 0 | 0 | — | | 14 | 0 |
| Union Fürstenwalde | 2019–20 | Regionalliga Nordost | 25 | 10 | 1 | 0 | — | | 26 | 10 |
| Union Fürstenwalde | Total | | 39 | 10 | 1 | 0 | 0 | 0 | 40 | 10 |
| Viktoria Berlin | 2020–21 | Regionalliga Nordost | 11 | 6 | 0 | 0 | — | | 11 | 6 |
| Viktoria Berlin | 2021–22 | 3. Liga | 10 | 1 | 0 | 0 | — | | 10 | 1 |
| Viktoria Berlin | Total | | 21 | 7 | 0 | 0 | 0 | 0 | 22 | 7 |
| Lübeck | 2022–23 | Regionalliga Nord | 29 | 7 | 4 | 2 | — | | 33 | 9 |
| Lübeck | 2023–24 | 3. Liga | 1 | 0 | 0 | 0 | — | | 1 | 0 |
| Lübeck | Total | | 30 | 7 | 4 | 2 | 0 | 0 | 34 | 9 |
| Career total | | | 227 | 80 | 16 | 6 | 0 | 0 | 237 | 86 |

== Honours ==
PKKU

- Kolmonen: 2012

Viktoria Berlin

- Regionalliga Nordost: 2020–21
