= Chʼol =

Chʼol may refer to:

- Chʼol language, a Mayan language of Mexico
- Chʼol people, an ethnic group of Mexico
  - Acala Chʼol, an extinct subdivision of the Chʼol people
  - Lakandon Chʼol, an extinct subdivision of the Chʼol people
  - Manche Chʼol, an extinct subdivision of the Chʼol people

== See also ==
- Chol (disambiguation)
