= Telar Ring Deng =

South Sudanese politician and statesman (1957–2020)

Ambassador of South Sudan to Russia
- In office 22 October 2014 – 26 October 2018
- Preceded by: Chol Deng Alak
- Succeeded by: Chol Tong Mayay Jang

Ambassador of South Sudan to Azerbaijan
- In office 2016 – 27 December 2020

Personal details
- Born: 28 December 1957
- Died: 27 December 2020 (aged 62)

Telar Ring Deng (28 December 1957 – 27 December 2020) was a South Sudanese politician and statesman.

Telar was an Atout Dinka, hailing from Yirol. When the SPLA split, Telar sided with the SPLA-Nasir. Together with Deng Ayuen Kurr, Telar was the most prominent Dinka leader in the SPLA-Nasir. Telar and Deng accompanied Lam Akol during his two-month stay in Western Europe. However Telar and Deng left the SPLA-Nasir after the Frankfurt talks, disappointed that separation had not been mentioned in the documents of the peace talks and the rapprochement between the SPLA-Nasir and the Khartoum government. Telar and Deng returned to the mainstream faction of the SPLA/SPLM.

Telar also represented the New Sudan Council of Churches for a period. He was also a negotiator for Riek Machar during reconciliation with the SPLM. He was reappointed by President Kiir as Legal Advisor, a post that he served before being named designate justice minister.

During the CPA period, Telar was named Minister of the Presidency of Southern Sudan. However, he was expelled from the SPLM by a presidential decree of President Salva Kiir on 23 November 2007. Telar was reinstated as a SPLM member on 28 August 2009.

In 2013, Telar was named Minister of Justice by President Salva Kiir. However, on 13 August 2013, the parliament of South Sudan voted by majority against Telar's nomination. 150 MPs voted against Telar's appointment, 97 in favour. This was the first time a presidential nomination for minister had been rejected by the South Sudanese parliament.

On 22 October 2014, he was named as the new envoy to Russia, a post he held until resigning on 26 January 2018. Telar Ring was appointed ambassador to Azerbaijan in 2016. Telar Ring died on 27 December 2020, reportedly from COVID-19 in Juba at the Aspen Medical Center, where he was being treated for the disease.

At the time of his death, Ambassador Telar was nominated to the Revitalized Transitional National Assembly by the SPLM-IO, and was primed as the Minority Leader. This was after his appointment as minister was rejected. It is understood that President Kiir retracted his earlier position of allocating Lakes State to the SPLM-IO after it became apparent to him that Dr. Riek had nominated Ambassador Telar for governorship.
