= Ladule Lako LoSarah =

South Sudanese footballer (born 1987)

Ladulé Lako LoSarah
Personal information
- Full name: Ladulé Samora Peter Lako LoSarah
- Date of birth: March 26, 1987 (age 39)
- Place of birth: Davis, California, United States
- Height: 6 ft 3 in (1.91 m)
- Position: Center forward

Youth career
- 2004: ES Fenain

College career
Years	Team	Apps	(Gls)
2005–2008	Swarthmore Garnet		

Senior career*
Years	Team	Apps	(Gls)
2009–2010	San Diego Flash		
2010–2011	Bregalnica Štip	3	(0)
2011–2012	San Diego Flash	30	(16)
2012	Central FC	1	(0)
2013	Maziya S&RC	3	(1)
2013–2014	Rayong United F.C.	26	(10)
2014–2016	Inter Leipzig	60	(16)

International career^{‡}
2013–2016	South Sudan	3	(0)

Managerial career
- 2015–2016: Inter Leipzig U-17s
- 2017: Pomona-Pitzer Sagehens (asst.)
- 2017–2019: Illinois Wesleyan Titans (asst.)
- 2017–2019: FC Diablos IL
- 2019–2021: Texas A&M International Dustdevils (asst.)
- 2021–2022: UC Riverside Highlanders (asst.)
- 2023-: Union Omaha (asst.)
- * Club domestic league appearances and goals as of December 31, 2016 ‡ National team caps and goals as of December 31, 2016

Ladulé Lako LoSarah (born March 26, 1987, in Davis, California) is a retired South Sudanese international footballer and assistant coach at Union Omaha.

== Career ==
=== Youth and college ===
LoSarah played at Claremont High School in Claremont, California, where he co-captained the varsity team alongside current USMNT player Tony Beltran before graduating in 2005. He attended Swarthmore College, playing for the Garnet soccer team. Upon graduating in 2009 with a degree in environmental science and French literature, he played for the newly formed San Diego Flash before moving abroad, becoming the first Swarthmore alumnus to play in the top division of any country.

=== Professional ===
Ladulé signed for FK Bregalnica Štip July 15, 2010, on a one-year deal and made his debut on August 14, 2010, in a league match versus FK Teteks.

LoSarah parted with his club on mutual terms and had a brief trial with FK Varnsdorf of the Czech 2. Liga who ultimately decided not to offer him a contract. He signed with his former club, the San Diego Flash, for the 2011 NPSL season.

=== International ===
LoSarah announced his desire, should the opportunity arise, to represent his father's homeland, South Sudan, at the international level.

In early 2012, Lako LoSarah was named to the candidate pool for the South Sudan national football team.

After strong performances in the 2013 AFC Cup and TPL Yamaha Division 1 League, Lako LoSarah was invited to the S.S.F.A. 2013 CECAFA Cup preparation camp, ultimately being selected for the 20 player roster of the South Sudan national football team. He made his debut in a November 30, 2013 match versus the Kenya national football team.

=== Coaching ===
While in Illinois, LoSarah was head coach of FC Diablos, a United Premier Soccer League club based in Bloomington, Illinois.

LoSarah became an assistant coach of the UC Riverside Highlanders men's soccer team, where he spent two seasons. In January 2023, LoSarah was named an assistant coach of Union Omaha under new head coach Dominic Casciato.

== Personal ==
He was born in Davis, California to an American mother and a South Sudanese refugee father, allowing him to be eligible to represent either nation at the international level.
