= Tadej Trdina =

Slovenian footballer

Personal information
- Full name: Tadej Trdina
- Date of birth: 25 January 1988 (age 38)
- Place of birth: Slovenj Gradec, SFR Yugoslavia
- Height: 1.89 m (6 ft 2 1/2 in)
- Position: Forward

Team information
- Current team: SV Ruden
- Number: 17

Youth career
- 1998–2007: SAK Klagenfurt

Senior career*
Years	Team	Apps	(Gls)
2007–2008	SAK Klagenfurt	7	(0)
2008–2012	SV Ruden	111	(97)
2012	SC Kalsdorf	14	(12)
2013–2014	SV Grödig	37	(14)
2013	→ SV Grödig II	1	(1)
2014–2017	Wolfsberger AC	31	(8)
2016	→ Wolfsberger AC II	3	(1)
2017–2018	USV Allerheiligen	25	(11)
2018–2019	Aluminij	14	(2)
2019–2021	Fužinar	42	(18)
2022–	SV Ruden	49	(36)
- * Club domestic league appearances and goals as of 3 February 2024

Tadej Trdina (born 25 January 1988) is a Slovenian footballer who plays for SV Ruden as a forward.
