= Dhour Ngor Chol =

Association football player

Personal information
- Full name: Dhour Ngor Chol
- Date of birth: 13 June 1993 (age 33)
- Place of birth: Perth, Australia
- Height: 1.83 m (6 ft 0 in)
- Position: Midfielder

Senior career*
Years	Team	Apps	(Gls)
2014	Inglewood United	2	(0)
2015-2017	Inter Leipzig	53	(3)
2017	Moreland Zebras	17	(3)
2019	Stirling Lions	21	(0)

International career
2015-2016	South Sudan	4	(0)
- * Club domestic league appearances and goals

Dhour Ngor Chol (born 13 June 1993) is a South Sudanese footballer who is last known to have played as a midfielder for Stirling Lions.

== Career ==
In 2015, Chol signed for German fifth division side Inter Leipzig but left due to homesickness.

In 2017, he signed for Moreland Zebras in the Australian second division

Before the 2019 season, he signed for Australian third division club Stirling Lions.
