= Chol Tong Mayay Jang =

South Sudanese politician

Governor of Lakes State
- In office 28 May 2010 – 22 January 2013

Ambassador of South Sudan to Russia
- Incumbent
- Assumed office 21 July 2018
- Preceded by: Telar Ring Deng

Personal details
- Born: 1 January 1964 (age 62) South Sudan

Chol Tong Mayay Jang (born 1 January 1964) is a South Sudanese politician. He served as governor of Lakes state from 28 May 2010, winning with 228,080 votes, representing 86.54% of total votes to 21 January 2013 when he was dismissed by South Sudanese President Salva Kiir. On 25 July 2018, he was appointed ambassador to Russia.
