= Ret Chol =

South Sudanese politician

Ret Chol was a Southern Sudanese politician from Nasir County of the Upper Nile state.

== Early life ==
A Nuer from Kuanylualthoan, Ret Chol had his earliest education in Ethiopia during which he came in contact with some Seventh-day Adventist missionaries who later baptized him. After completing his high school in Ethiopia he went to Lebanon to study at the Middle East Union College of the Seventh-day Adventist Church. Ret Chol was the first Sudanese to become a baptized Seventh-day Adventist. After completing his major in business administration he came back to Sudan and started the first Adventist church group that worshipped in a house in the Sudanese capital of Khartoum.

== Political career ==
While he was the first to embrace the privilege to share the ministry of the Adventist Church with his fellow Sudanese, something else was creating an impact on his life as a person. There were privileges for him to work in the government and he did his best to see that the opportunity did not slip away. Because of his involvement in the politics, he was unable to effectively work as a missionary. However, his values and beliefs did not change. He became a government official in Malakal, the capital city of the Upper Nile State. Three years later he was appointed to be the deputy Commissioner for Nasir County. He had some political rivals like Joshua Dei Wal (also from Nasir). When the war broke out in The Jongulei Capital Mading Bor, Mr. Chol came to Khartoum and was appointed as the Minister of the local governments. He later won the title of the Upper Nile State governor. This was the regime of Sadiq El-Mahdi the former Premier of Sudan.

=== Contemporaries ===
Ret Chol had many friends who themselves were from the Nuer community. These are John Gilla Lul, David Koak Guok, Peter Lam Nguth, Kueth Kang, Daniel Koat Duoth and others Like William Nyuon Bany. Many of Nasir politicians lost their lives during the civil war that started in 1983 in Bor. Due to the competition and political marginalization, many Nuer politicians were unable to pursue their careers because of so much nepotism.

== Later years ==
On June 30, General El Bashir took power and removed El-Mahdi from his post as prime minister. Ret Chol, a civilian politician was unable to gain any place in the government of The National Salvation Revolution. In early 2000s, he was appointed an ambassador before his death in May 2004. Ret Chol did not side with any political group.
