= Daniel T. J. Mathews =

Mississippi state legislator

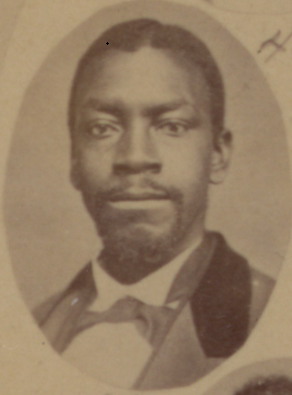

Daniel T. J. Mathews was an African-American teacher, lawyer, and mail agent who served as state legislator in Mississippi. He represented Panola County, Mississippi in the Mississippi House of Representatives in 1874 and 1875. Eric Foner lists him as D. F. J. Matthews in Freedom's Lawmakers.

== See also ==
- African American officeholders from the end of the Civil War until before 1900
