= Dan Mathews =

American activist

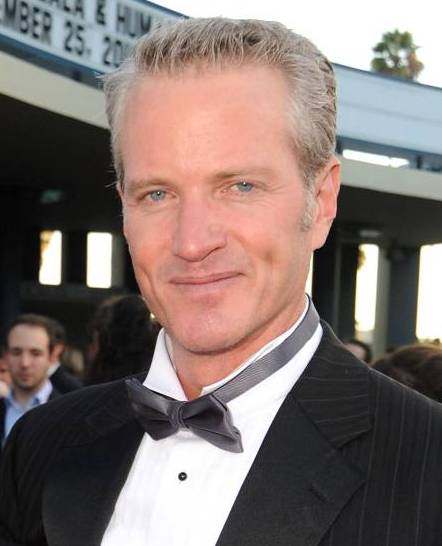
- Dan Mathews in 2010
- Born: October 24, 1964 (age 61); Newport Beach, California, U.S.
- Education: American University
- Occupations: Senior Vice President of PETA and an author

Dan Mathews (born October 24, 1964) is the senior vice president of People for the Ethical Treatment of Animals. He is known for creating PETA's most newsworthy campaigns, including the "I'd Rather Go Naked Than Wear Fur" ads, as well as campaigns involving celebrities such as Alec Baldwin, Pamela Anderson, Pink, and Paul McCartney. He has been profiled by the NY Times, USA Today, and Wall St. Journal and has lectured on animal rights and veganism at Harvard, Princeton, Columbia, Oxford and Cambridge.

Mathews is best known for heading PETA's successful fashion campaigns, having persuaded designers like Michael Kors and Calvin Klein to stop using fur, and working with Tim Gunn to promote animal-free materials at Fashion Week events and through programs at the Council of Fashion Designers of America (CFDA). In 2020, Mathews convinced Tommy Hilfiger to ban exotic animal skins after reports showed that the wild animal trade posed risks to spawning zoonotic diseases like COVID-19.

In 2000, Mathews was named by gay lifestyle magazine Genre as one of the most influential people of the new millennium, and in 2007, Mathews was ranked 37th in Out magazine's "50 Most Powerful Gay Men and Women in America".

Mathews has written two acclaimed memoirs published by Atria/Simon & Schuster. Committed: A Rabble-Rouser's Memoir was published in the US and Australia in 2007, and in the UK, Italy, Germany and France over the following decade. "Committed is a bold, offbeat globe-trotting memoir that shows how the most ridiculed punching bag in high school became an internationally renowned crusader for the most downtrodden individuals of all - animals". Like Crazy: Life with my Mother and her Invisible Friends was published in 2020. In this book, Mathews writes about caring for his clever, schizophrenic mother in her last years. In a starred review, Publishers Weekly wrote "Mathews conveys potentially heavy and gut-wrenching family crises with page-turning style and heaps of wit." In 2021, Jeopardy host and neurologist Mayim Bialik featured Mathews on her mental health podcast Bialik's Breakdown to launch the paperback edition of "Like Crazy".

== See also ==
- List of animal rights advocates

== Bibliography ==
- Committed: A Rabble-Rouser's Memoir, 2007
- Like Crazy: Life with my Mother and her Invisible Friends, 2020
