= Patrick O'Shaughnessy (footballer) =

Finnish footballer (born 1993)

Personal information
- Date of birth: 29 January 1993 (age 33)
- Place of birth: Riihimäki, Finland
- Height: 1.81 m (5 ft 11 in)
- Position: Defender

Team information
- Current team: HPS

Youth career
- FC Honka
- HJK

Senior career*
Years	Team	Apps	(Gls)
2009–2011	Klubi 04	29	(0)
2012–2013	MYPA	42	(0)
2014	PK-35 Vantaa	10	(0)
2015–2016	RiPS		
2016	MPS	9	(0)
2017	NJS		
2018–2019	PK-35 Vantaa		
2020–	HPS		

International career
- Finland U15
- Finland U16
- Finland U17
- Finland U19
2013	Finland U21	6	(1)
- * Club domestic league appearances and goals as of 28 May 2013

Patrick O'Shaughnessy (born 29 January 1993) is a Finnish footballer who plays as a defender for Finnish club HPS.

== Early life ==
O'Shaughnessy was born in Riihimäki on 29 January 1993, the son of a Finnish mother and Irish father (Robert, a painter from Galway). He holds both Finnish and Irish citizenship. His younger brother Daniel is also a footballer who plays for HJK and the Finland national team.

== Club career ==
O'Shaughnessy made his Veikkausliiga debut on 15 April 2012, appearing as a starter against TPS. After being released in winter 2013, he signed for Pallokerho-35 in April 2014.

== International career ==
O'Shaughnessy has represented Finland at age-group level. In November 2013, he expressed an interest in playing for Ireland, stating that he felt "more Irish than Finnish". He said, "I think maybe it has to do with my personality and it would make my father very proud if I played for Ireland."
