= Daniel Koat Mathews =

Former Governor of the Upper Nile Region

Personal details
- Born: 1 January 1937 Kuanylualthoan (Nasir), Upper Nile, Sudan
- Died: 4 September 2018 (aged 81) Nairobi, Kenya
- Profession: Politician

Military service
- Allegiance: Sudan People's Liberation Army
- Rank: Major General

Daniel Koat Mathews (1 January 1937 – 4 September 2018), popularly known as DK Mathews, was a prominent politician and Nuer leader, who held several government positions and has been effectively involved in the national politics for many years. He was a major general in the Sudan People's Liberation Army now known as South Sudan People's Defense Forces.

== Biography ==
Daniel Koat Mathews (DK) hail from Eastern Jikany Nuer People of Gaajiok (Gaat Majiok Ki̱r Kakër) clan of Yoal kën. He was born in KuanyLualThɔa̱n, Upper Nile State. He speaks Arabic, English, Ethiopian, Swedish and his native Nuer language.

=== Political career ===
Daniel Mathews was appointed Governor of the Upper Nile Province. In 1983, the Regional Government of Southern Sudan was divided into three Provinces. These were Bahr-El ghazal Region, Equatoria Region and the Upper Nile Region. Mathews was the governor of the Upper Nile Region for a number of years before he left that position, after the government of Gaafar Nimeiry failed to survive the national turmoil created by the war in the South and the uprising in the North.

In 1983 when the war broke out in Bor town, Dr. Garang went to Ethiopia. He was followed by many other Southern Sudan Commanders. In Ethiopia there was a split between the Southern Sudanese forces. Dr. Garang and other politicians embraced the idea of liberating the whole Sudan from the Arab rulers while other Southern Sudanese like Samuel Gai Tut and Akuot Atem insisted on the idea of simply liberating the South and making it an independent country from the North. This split led to a bloodshed which resulted in the death of both Samuel Gai Tut and Akuot Atem. After that incident, the former Anyanya 1 began to call itself Anyanya 2. That was not the name it was referred to by the SPLA soldiers. Under Gordon Koang and Duol Chol The Anyanya 2 created a link to the government in Khartoum. Between 1984 and 1986, a bloody war maintained its ugly presence and resulted in the death of many SPLA soldiers and civilians. In 1987 Daniel Mathews decided to introduce reconciliation between the SPLA and Anyanya 1. His efforts succeeded and resulted in the merging of two military organizations until 1991, when Dr. Riek Machar and Dr. Lam Akol decided to stage a coup and remove Dr. Garang. Mr. Daniel Koat Mathews is still known by countless Sudanese for this historic act of making reconciliation a success at the time it was badly needed in Southern Sudan. This merging led to military victories for SPLA. Nasir was captured and SPLA remained strong for sometime.

General Daniel K. Mathews later joined the government of Southern Sudan, and served as a major general in the Sudan People's Liberation Army until his death in Nairobi Kenya. DK witnessed the separation of South Sudan from the Sudan in 2011 as the result of Comprehensive Peace Agreement that was signed in Kenya with the help of IGAD and The International Community in 2005.

Matthews died on 4 September 2018, at the age of 81.
