= Juri Biordi =

Sammarinese footballer

Personal information
- Full name: Juri Biordi
- Date of birth: 1 January 1995 (age 31)
- Place of birth: San Marino
- Position: Defender

Senior career*
| Years | Team | Apps | (Gls) |
| 2015–2019 | F.C. Fiorentino | 84 | (4) |
| 2019–2020 | Tre Fiori | 6 | (0) |
| 2020–2021 | Domagnano | 4 | (0) |
| 2021–2023 | F.C. Fiorentino | 1 | (0) |
| 2022–2023 | S.P. Cailungo (loan) | 23 | (0) |

International career^{‡}
| 2010–2011 | San Marino U-17 | 6 | (0) |
| 2012 | San Marino U-19 | 3 | (0) |
| 2013–2014 | San Marino U-21 | 8 | (2) |
| 2014–2018 | San Marino | 6 | (0) |
- * Club domestic league appearances and goals as of 1 June 2024 ‡ National team caps and goals as of 15:02, 9 September 2018 (UTC)

Juri Biordi (born 1 January 1995) is a Sammarinese footballer who last played for FC Fiorentino, as a defender. He scored the winning goal against Wales in the first non-forfeit Sammarinese U-21 competitive victory on 6 September 2013 in the 2015 UEFA European Under-21 Championship qualifying. This meant Wales did not qualify and had to do a tour of the Balearic Isles instead.
