= Inter Leipzig =

German football club

- Full name: Fußballclub International; Leipzig e. V.
- Founded: 2013; 12 years ago
- Ground: Mariannenpark, Leipzig; Sportpark Tresenwald, Machern
- Coach: Zoran Levnaic
- League: NOFV-Oberliga Süd (V)
- 2018–19: 4th
- Website: http://fc-inter.com
Home colours	Away colours

Inter Leipzig is a German association football club located in Leipzig, Saxony. Their first team competes in the NOFV-Oberliga, the fifth tier of German football.

== History ==
According to the Inter Leipzig mission statement, the club claims to become the "international and open-minded" Leipzig football team. The former mayor of Leipzig, Wolfgang Tiefensee, serves on the economic board.

In order to participate in the 2014–15 Sachsenliga season, Inter Leipzig merged with SV See 90 from the Upper Lusatian town Niesky. Previously, the club had unsuccessfully attempted to merge with TuS Leutzsch of Leipzig.

The first official match was played in the opening round of the Saxony Cup 2014–15 against SV Lipsia Eutritzsch, which ended in a 2–0 win for Inter Leipzig. On the last day of the 2014–15 season, the team was promoted to the NOFV-Oberliga Süd after a 7–0 win against Heidenauer SV. In July 2015 the team introduced a new team logo. The unicorn was replaced by a lion, which is the heraldic animal of the city of Leipzig.

=== Logo ===
2013–2015

2015–

== Past seasons ==
Season	League	Place	W	D	L	GF	GA	Pts	Saxony Cup
2014–15	Sachsenliga (VI)	2nd	18	5	7	66	34	59	Quarterfinals
2015–16	NOFV-Oberliga Süd (V)	2nd	12	4	4	46	21	25	Best of 16
2016–17	NOFV-Oberliga Süd (V)	8th	11	10	9	45	38	7	Second round
Green marks a season followed by promotion, red a season followed by relegation.

== Current squad ==
As of 27 March 2016

Note: Flags indicate national team as defined under FIFA eligibility rules; some limited exceptions apply. Players may hold more than one non-FIFA nationality.

No.	Pos.	Nation	Player
1	GK	(Spain) ESP	Edu Calvo Martin
3	DF	(Germany) GER	Sascha Rode
4	MF	(Spain) ESP	Marcos López Arias
7	FW	(Germany) GER	Carlos Brinsa
8	MF	(South Korea) KOR	Dongmin Kim
9	FW	(Germany) GER	Saif Al Abri
10	FW	(Greece) GRE	Christos Papadimitriou
11	MF	(Spain) ESP	Manuel Moral Fuster
12	FW	(South Sudan) SSD	Ladule Lako LoSarah
14	GK	(Germany) GER	Christian Schmedtje
15	DF	(Greece) GRE	Christopher Duberet

No.	Pos.	Nation	Player
21	MF	(Germany) GER	Ahmad Monir Rosta
22	MF	(Iraq) IRQ	Jihad Al Jindo
23	DF	(Germany) GER	Franz Bochmann
25	DF	(South Sudan) SSD	Dhour Ngor Chol
26	DF	(Germany) GER	Gerald Muwanga
27	DF	(Germany) GER	Dominic Schöps
29	GK	(Germany) GER	Rene Hartleib
30	FW	(Germany) GER	Kai Druschky
32	MF	(Albania) ALB	Xhonatan Muca
39	DF	(Japan) JPN	Yuya Okuda

== International players ==
Nerijus Astrauskas appeared in two games for Lithuania.
