= 2006–07 Austrian Cup =

ÖFB Cup (German)

Tournament details
- Country: Austria
- Teams: 52

Final positions
- Champions: Austria Vienna
- Runners-up: SV Mattersburg

Tournament statistics
- Matches played: 51
- Goals scored: 172 (3.37 per match)
- Top goal scorer: David Witteveen (6)

The 2006–07 Austrian Cup (German: ÖFB-Cup) was the 73rd season of Austria's nationwide football cup competition. It started on July 28, 2006 with the first game of the preliminary round. The final was held at the Gerhard Hanappi Stadium, Vienna on 1 May 2007.

The teams representing Austria in European competitions (Austria Wien, Red Bull Salzburg, FC Pasching and SV Mattersburg) received a bye to the third round of the tournament.

The competition was won by Austria Vienna after beating SV Mattersburg 2–1. It was the 26th Austrian Cup title for the team from Vienna and the third in a row. Austria Vienna also qualified for the second qualifying round of the 2007–08 UEFA Cup in the process.

== Preliminary round ==
The preliminary round involved 60 amateur clubs from all regional federations, divided into smaller groups according to the Austrian federal states. Thirty games were played between July 28 and August 15, 2006, with the winners advancing to the first round.

Team 1	Score	Team 2
28 July 2006
SK Sankt Andrä	2–1	SV Spittal
FC St. Veit	4–2	SAK Klagenfurt
DSG Union Perg	0–2	Union St. Florian
FC Waidhofen/Ybbs	2–4 (a.e.t.)	SV Würmla
29 July 2006
FC Wels	0–4	1. FC Vöcklabruck
FC Blau-Weiß Linz	4–0	SV Grieskirchen
30 July 2007
SC Neudörfl	3–4	Nordea Admira Amateure
1 August 2006
WSG Wattens	2–0	FC BW Feldkirch
SV Hall	2–0	SPG Axams Götzens
GAK Amateure	3–1	SK Sturm Amateure
SV Mattersburg Amateure	0–2	Wiener Sport-Club
ASK Kohfidisch	1–0	SV Schwechat
2 August 2006
FC RW Rankweil	2–0	FC Hard
IAC FC	0–2	FC Kufstein
4 August 2006
SV Gmunden	2–3	SV Bad Schallerbach
ATSV Obergrafendorf	1–7	SV Horn
8 August 2006
1. Oberndorfer SK	0–2 (a.e.t.)	Union Vöcklamarkt
SC Gleisdorf 1919	3–2	SK Schwadorf
PSV Team für Wien	2–1 (a.e.t.)	SV Stegersbach
First Vienna FC	4–0	ZS Simmering
9 August 2006
Seekirchen	2–3 (a.e.t.)	FC Hallein 04
SC Kalsdorf	2–1	SV Gleinstätten
14 August 2006
USV Allerheiligen	2–1	ASK Köflach
SC Zwettl	2–4 (a.e.t.)	SKN St. Pölten
Gersthofer SV	1–2	SKU Amstetten
Kremser SC	2–0	ASK Kottingbrunn
SC Neusiedl am See 1919	1–3	SC Ritzing
15 August 2006
Salzburg Amateure	4–1	Salzburger AK 1914
SV Feldkirchen	2–0	FC Kärnten Amateure
Arb. SK Voitsberg	4–1	SV Bad Aussee

== First round ==
The first round games were played on September 12 – 13, 2006.

Team 1	Score	Team 2
12 September 2006
Kremser SC	0–4	FC Lustenau 07
FC Kufstein	0–2	SC Schwanenstadt
SKN Sankt Pölten	3–2	SV Kapfenberg
1. FC Vöcklabruck	0–1	TSV Hartberg
Admira Amateure	0–4	FC Kärnten
SC Kalsdorf	1–0	SK Sturm Graz
ASK Kohfidisch	1–2	FC Gratkorn
ASK Voitsberg	1–0	FC Wacker Tirol
SKU Amstetten	1–2 (a.e.t.)	Grazer AK
GAK Amateure	5–6 (a.e.t.)	LASK Linz
SV Horn	3–1	SC-ESV Parndorf 1919
FC Blau-Weiß Linz	3–3 (a.e.t.) (3–4 p)	SV Ried
SV Würmla	1–2 (a.e.t.)	FC Admira Wacker Mödling
SC Ritzing	1–3	SC Austria Lustenau
SC Gleisdorf 1919	1–5	DSV Leoben
SV Feldkirchen	3–3 (a.e.t.) (4–3 p)	SC Rheindorf Altach
SK Sankt Andrä	1–0 (a.e.t.)	FK Austria Amateure
PSV Team für Wien	5–0	FC St. Veit
Salzburg Amateure	5–1	Union St. Florian
Union Vöcklamarkt	2–0	SV Hall
SV Bad Schallerbach	2–1	FC RW Rankweil
Wiener Sport-Club	5–1	WSG Wattens
12 September 2006
First Vienna FC	1–1 (a.e.t.) (4–3 p)	SK Rapid Wien
USV Allerheiligen	3–0	FC Hallein 04

=== Matches ===
12 September 2006	Kremser SC	0–4	FC Lustenau 07	Krems an der Donau
19:30		Report	Rödl 15'; Winsauer 79'; Djulic 87'; Özgün 90+1'	Stadium: Sepp-Doll-Stadion; Attendance: 120; Referee: Andreas Rothmann

12 September 2006	FC Kufstein	0–2	SC Schwanenstadt	Kufstein
19:00	Gruber (yellow card) 17' (red card)	Report	Manojlović 18'; Bammer 45'	Attendance: 250; Referee: Mario Strudl

12 September 2006	SKN Sankt Pölten	3–2	SV Kapfenberg	Sankt Pölten
19:00	Brandstetter 55'; Choji 61'; Doğan 90+3'	Report	Pfeilstöcker 11'; Alex 45'	Stadium: Voith-Platz; Attendance: 600; Referee: Andreas Fellinger

12 September 2006	1. FC Vöcklabruck	0–1	TSV Hartberg	Vöcklabruck
19:00		Report	Falk 19'	Stadium: Voralpenstadion; Attendance: 500; Referee: Rene Zechner

12 September 2006	Admira Amateure	0–4	FC Kärnten	Mödling
19:00		Report	Sand 32', 35'; Jumić 53', 89'	Stadium: Bundesstadion Südstadt; Attendance: 300; Referee: Roland Braunschmidt

12 September 2006	SC Kalsdorf	1–0	SK Sturm Graz	Kalsdorf bei Graz
19:00	Hack 75'	Report		Attendance: 4,300; Referee: Michael Robitsch

12 September 2006	ASK Kohfidisch	1–2	FC Gratkorn	Kohfidisch
19:00	Németh 61'	Report	Panagiotopoulos 37'; Kanneh 83'	Attendance: 1,000; Referee: Markus Hameter

12 September 2006	ASK Voitsberg	1–0	FC Wacker Tirol	Voitsberg
19:00	Strafner 61'	Report	Eder (yellow card) 90' (red card)	Attendance: 1,500; Referee: Harald Lechner

12 September 2006	SKU Amstetten	1–2 (a.e.t.)	Grazer AK	Amstetten
19:00	Holzer 57'	Report	Hassler 68'; Đokić 101'	Attendance: 700; Referee: Oliver Drachta

12 September 2006	GAK Amateure	5–6 (a.e.t.)	LASK Linz	Graz
19:00	Schenk 32', 62' (pen.); Perchtold 56', 70'; Mohiden 90+3'	Report	Mijatović 13'; Ehmann 24', 45'; Konrad 33'; Panis 83'; Ortner 92'	Stadium: GAK-Trainingszentrum; Attendance: 600; Referee: Andreas Lambert

12 September 2006	SV Horn	3–1	SC-ESV Parndorf 1919	Horn
19:00	Sekic 27'; Karl 34'; Blauensteiner 90+4'; Latour (red card) 42'	Report	Novak 90+3'; Bradaric (red card) 42'	Attendance: 450; Referee: Christian Werschnik

12 September 2006	FC Blau-Weiß Linz	3–3 (a.e.t.) (3–4 p)	SV Ried	Linz
19:00	Jelcic 27' (pen.); Lindenbauer 40'; Koll 115'; Bule (yellow card) 77' (red card)	Report	Martínez 16', 85'; Seo 101'; Drechsel (red card) 80'; Damjanović (red card) 92'	Stadium: Donauparkstadion; Attendance: 2,000; Referee: Stefan Tschandl
	Penalties
	Lindenbauer (penalty scored); Gradescevic (penalty scored); Eres (penalty scored); Schimpl (penalty missed); Göksin (penalty missed)		Martínez (penalty scored); Pichorner (penalty scored); Brenner (penalty scored); Jank (penalty scored)

12 September 2006	SV Würmla	1–2 (a.e.t.)	FC Admira Wacker Mödling	Würmla
16:15	Kahirdeh 68'	Report	Motevaselzadeh 17'; Koller 117'	Attendance: 500; Referee: Christian Haudum

12 September 2006	SC Ritzing	1–3	SC Austria Lustenau	Ritzing
19:00	Swoboda 80'	Report	Friesenbichler 15', 54'; Scherrer 27'	Stadium: Sonnensee-Stadion; Attendance: 300; Referee: Andreas Vodik

12 September 2006	SC Gleisdorf 1919	1–5	DSV Leoben	Gleisdorf
19:00	Kern 44'	Report	Aigner 13'; Stanković 15', 29'; Harding 41'; Kozelsky 61'	Attendance: 600; Referee: Rene Eisner

12 September 2006	SV Feldkirchen	3–3 (a.e.t.) (4–3 p)	SC Rheindorf Altach	Feldkirchen in Kärnten
19:00	Friessnegger 33'; Zaiser 85'; Miloti 97'	Report	Jagne 65'; Cemernjak 76'; Pfister 109'	Stadium: Sportplatz; Attendance: 1,700; Referee: Rudolf Gruber

12 September 2006	SK Sankt Andrä	1–0 (a.e.t.)	FK Austria Amateure	Sankt Andrä-Wördern
19:00	Dvorsak 96'	Report		Attendance: 500; Referee: Gerald Bauernfeind

12 September 2006	PSV Team für Wien	5–0	FC St. Veit	Kaisermühlen
18:00	Frantsich 13', 63'; Djuricic 34'; Schatz 45'; Lukić 88'	Report		Stadium: PSV-Platz; Attendance: 200; Referee: Christian Dintar

12 September 2006	Salzburg Amateure	5–1	Union St. Florian	Salzburg
18:00	Borozni 13', 63'; Vujić 53'; Keil 73', 84'; Witteveen 88'	Report	Sonko 57' (o.g.)	Stadium: Red Bull Arena; Attendance: 350; Referee: Cemil Et

12 September 2006	Union Vöcklamarkt	2–0	SV Hall	Vöcklamarkt
19:00	Hasenöhrl 54'; Spiric 89'	Report		Referee: Franz Maislinger

12 September 2006	SV Bad Schallerbach	2–1	FC RW Rankweil	Bad Schallerbach
19:00	Achleitner 9'; Haderer 90'	Report	Fleisch 14'; Lepir (red card) 90'	Attendance: 200; Referee: Norbert Schwab

12 September 2006	Wiener Sport-Club	5–1	WSG Wattens	Vienna
19:00	Neidhart 7'; Bozkurt 41'; Cehajić 48', 83', 89'	Report	Fleisch 14'; Lepir (red card) 90'	Stadium: Sportclub-Platz; Attendance: 750; Referee: Paul Pethö

12 September 2006	USV Allerheiligen	3–0	FC Hallein 04	Allerheiligen bei Wildon
19:00	Kerpicz 47'; Sinic 82'; Felgitscher 90+2'	Report		Attendance: 400; Referee: Thomas Paukovits

13 September 2006	First Vienna FC	1–1 (a.e.t.) (4–3 p)	SK Rapid Wien	Vienna
19:00	Mogyoro 1'	Report	Hiden 1'; Valachovič (red card) 32'	Stadium: Hohe Warte Stadium; Attendance: 5,500; Referee: Christian Klement
	Penalties
	Pürk (penalty missed); Duran (penalty scored); Zechner (penalty scored); Fading (penalty scored); Fuka (penalty scored)		Bazina (penalty scored); Bejbl (penalty scored); Hlinka (penalty scored); Sara (penalty missed); Kincl (penalty missed)

== Second round ==
The second round games were played on October 17 – 24, 2006.

Team 1	Score	Team 2
17 October 2006
PSV Team für Wien	2–4	Grazer AK
23 October 2006
USV Allerheiligen	2–3 (a.e.t.)	SC Schwanenstadt
24 October 2006
ASK Voitsberg	2–1	FC Gratkorn
SC Kalsdorf	1–3	LASK Linz
SK Sankt Andrä	2–2 (a.e.t.) (3–2 p)	TSV Hartberg
SKN Sankt Pölten	1–3 (a.e.t.)	FC Lustenau 07
SV Bad Schallerbach	1–1 (a.e.t.) (3–4 p)	SV Ried
SV Feldkirchen	1–2	Salzburg Amateure
SV Horn	3–1	FC Wacker Tirol
Union Vöcklamarkt	0–4	FC Kärnten
First Vienna FC	3–0	DSV Leoben
Wiener Sport-Club	4–1	SC Austria Lustenau

=== Matches ===
17 October 2006	PSV Team für Wien	2–4	Grazer AK	Kaisermühlen
19:00	Lukic 49'; Schatz 86'	Report	Hassler 6', 22'; Muratović 37'; Škoro 74'; Amerhauser (yellow card) 68' (red card) 77'	Stadium: PSV-Platz; Attendance: 600; Referee: Thomas Paukovits

23 October 2006	USV Allerheiligen	2–3 (a.e.t.)	SC Schwanenstadt	Allerheiligen bei Wildon
19:00	Kelbert 79'; Kucera 118'	Report	Laimer 19'; Fidjeu 111', 115'	Attendance: 900; Referee: Thorsten Obwurzer

24 October 2006	ASK Voitsberg	2–1 (a.e.t.)	FC Gratkorn	Voitsberg
19:00	Hiden 7'; Bernsteiner 47'	Report	Rauscher 33'	Attendance: 800; Referee: Rene Eisner

24 October 2006	SC Kalsdorf	1–3	LASK Linz	Kalsdorf bei Graz
19:00	Batin 26'	Report	Panis 10'; Mühlbauer 32'; Konrad 70'	Attendance: 800; Referee: Manfred Krassnitzer

24 October 2006	SK Sankt Andrä	2–2 (a.e.t.) (3–2 p)	TSV Hartberg	St. Andrä
19:00	Dvorsak 17'; Höller 48'	Report	Engleder 7'; Falk 10'	Attendance: 350; Referee: Rudolf Gruber
	Penalties
	Dvorsak (penalty scored); Oberisser (penalty scored); Jochum (penalty missed); Grassler (penalty scored)		Jerkovic (penalty scored); Krautberger (penalty scored); Abwerzger (penalty missed); Eder (penalty missed); Koch (penalty missed)

24 October 2006	SKN Sankt Pölten	1–3 (a.e.t.)	FC Lustenau 07	Sankt Pölten
19:00	Feurer 77' (pen.); Fallmann (yellow card) 11' (red card) 109'	Report	Đulić 34'; Sidinei 103'; Sabia 120'	Stadium: Voith-Platz; Attendance: 800; Referee: Christian Klement

24 October 2006	SV Bad Schallerbach	1–1 (a.e.t.) (3–4 p)	SV Ried	Bad Schallerbach
19:00	Haderer 101'	Report	Damjanović 120'	Attendance: 1,200; Referee: Dr. Thomas Prammer

24 October 2006	SV Feldkirchen	1–2	Salzburg Amateure	Feldkirchen in Kärnten
19:00	Micheu 37'	Report	Witteveen 30', 36'	Attendance: 800; Referee: Michael Robitsch

24 October 2006	SV Horn	3–1	FC Wacker Tirol	Horn
19:30	Sekic 66'; Pacinda 67'; Blauensteiner 83'	Report	Scharrer 15' (pen.); Rainer (yellow card) 20' (red card)	Attendance: 1,400; Referee: Martin Cipps

24 October 2006	Union Vöcklamarkt	0–4	FC Kärnten	Vöcklamarkt
19:00		Report	Weber 46'; Sand 74'; Toth 85'; Zakany 86'	Attendance: 500; Referee: Rene Zechner

24 October 2006	First Vienna FC	3–0 (a.e.t.)	DSV Leoben	Vienna
19:00	Dunst 114'; Pušić 117'; Weerman 119'	Report		Stadium: Hohe Warte Stadium; Attendance: 950; Referee: Michael Schmid

24 October 2006	Wiener Sport-Club	4–1	SC Austria Lustenau	Vienna
19:30	Dorner 9', 54'; Niefergall 71'; Akaslan 81'	Report	Friesenbichler 62'	Stadium: Sportclub-Platz; Attendance: 870; Referee: Markus Mayr

== Third round ==
The third round games were played on November 14 – 21, 2006.

Team 1	Score	Team 2
14 November 2006
First Vienna FC	0–0 (a.e.t.) (3–5 p)	FC Lustenau 07
21 November 2006
ASK Voitsberg	0–3	SV Horn
Austria Wien	0–0 (a.e.t.) (4–2 p)	FC Pasching
FC Kärnten	3–1	SC Schwanenstadt
Salzburg Amateure	2–0	LASK Linz
SK Sankt Andrä	1–3 (a.e.t.)	SV Ried
Wiener Sport-Club	0–2	SV Mattersburg
22 November 2006
Grazer AK	0–2	Red Bull Salzburg

=== Matches ===
14 November 2006	First Vienna FC	0–0 (a.e.t.) (3–5 p)	FC Lustenau 07	Vienna
19:00		Report		Stadium: Hohe Warte Stadium; Attendance: 1,000; Referee: Michael Schmid
	Penalties
	Duran (penalty missed); Cvetković (penalty scored); Rizvanović (penalty scored); Zechner (penalty scored)		Rödl (penalty scored); Erbek (penalty scored); Winsauer (penalty scored); Hämmerle (penalty scored); Sidinei (penalty scored)

21 November 2006	ASK Voitsberg	0–3	SV Horn	Voitsberg
19:00		Report	Blauensteiner 22'; Pacinda 43', 90'	Stadium: Hans Blümel-Stadion; Attendance: 1,000; Referee: Christian Dintar

21 November 2006	Austria Wien	1–1 (a.e.t.) (4–2 p)	FC Pasching	Vienna
19:00	Mair 43'	Report	Sariyar 78'	Stadium: Franz Horr Stadium; Attendance: 1,335; Referee: Manfred Krassnitzer
	Penalties
	Lasnik (penalty scored); Wallner (penalty scored); Mair (penalty scored); Aigner (penalty scored)		Gilewicz (penalty scored); Chiquinho (penalty scored); Chaile (penalty missed); Baur (penalty missed)

21 November 2006	FC Kärnten	3–1	SC Schwanenstadt	Klagenfurt
19:00	Zakany 74'; Toth 79', 89'	Report	Fidjeu 60'	Stadium: Sportzentrum Fischl; Attendance: 500; Referee: Stefan Tschandl

21 November 2006	Salzburg Amateure	2–0	LASK Linz	Salzburg
19:00	Keil 74'; Orosz 79'	Report		Stadium: Red Bull Arena; Attendance: 2,000; Referee: Herwig Seidler

21 November 2006	SK Sankt Andrä	1–3 (a.e.t.)	SV Ried	St. Andrä
19:00	Pichorner 77' (o.g.)	Report	Berger 44'; Wolf 106', 120'	Attendance: 1,500; Referee: Rudolf Gruber

21 November 2006	Wiener Sport-Club	0–2	SV Mattersburg	Vienna
19:30		Report	Naumoski 28'; Kühbauer 45' (pen.)	Stadium: Sportclub-Platz; Attendance: 2,300; Referee: Thomas Steiner

22 November 2006	Grazer AK	0–2	Red Bull Salzburg	Graz
19:00	Kujabi (red card) 65'	Report	Piták 69'; Zickler 84'	Stadium: UPC-Arena; Attendance: 2,500; Referee: Fritz Stuchlik

== Quarter-finals ==
The games were played on March 13, 2007.

Team 1	Score	Team 2
13 March 2007
FC Kärnten	0–3	Red Bull Salzburg
FC Lustenau 07	1–3	SV Mattersburg
SV Horn	1–3	Salzburg Amateure
SV Ried	0–3	Austria Wien

=== Matches ===
13 March 2007	FC Kärnten	0–3	Red Bull Salzburg	Klagenfurt
19:00		Report	Zickler 16'; Aufhauser 27'; Ježek 80'	Stadium: Sportzentrum Fischl; Attendance: 3,200; Referee: Christian Steindl

13 March 2007	FC Lustenau 07	1–3	SV Mattersburg	Lustenau
19:00	Erbek 90+1'	Report	Csizmadia 45+2'; Jancker 58'; Fuchs 69'	Stadium: Reichshofstadion; Attendance: 1,500; Referee: Thomas Einwaller

13 March 2007	SV Horn	1–3	Salzburg Amateure	Horn
19:00	Kellner 90'	Report	Witteveen 6', 37'; Vujić 83'	Attendance: 3,000; Referee: Gerhard Grobelnik

13 March 2007	SV Ried	0–3	Austria Wien	Ried im Innkreis
19:30	Eder (yellow card) 74' (red card)	Report	Aigner 5'; Standfest 90'; Pichlmann 90+2'	Stadium: Fill Metallbau Stadion; Attendance: 3,100; Referee: Bernhard Brugger

== Semi-finals ==
The games were played on 3 and 4 April 2007.

Team 1	Score	Team 2
3 April 2007
Red Bull Salzburg	2–3 (a.e.t.)	SV Mattersburg
4 April 2007
Salzburg Amateure	1–1 (a.e.t.) (1–3 p)	Austria Wien

=== Results ===
3 April 2007	Red Bull Salzburg	2–3 (a.e.t.)	SV Mattersburg	Salzburg
18:00	Aufhauser 15'; Steinhöfer 26'	Report	Csizmadia 69'; Naumoski 83', 110'	Stadium: Red Bull Arena; Attendance: 7,500; Referee: Dietmar Drabek

4 April 2007	Salzburg Amateure	1–1 (a.e.t.) (1–3 p)	Austria Wien	Salzburg
18:00	Witteveen 23'; Sonko (yellow card) 72' (red card)	Report	Pichlmann 83'	Stadium: Red Bull Arena; Attendance: 9,000; Referee: Robert Schörgenhofer
	Penalties
	Hütter (penalty missed); Obermair (penalty missed); Öbster (penalty scored); Prenn (penalty missed)		Ačimovič (penalty scored); Standfest (penalty scored); Wallner (penalty scored)

== Final ==
=== Details ===
1 May 2007
20:30

Austria Wien	2–1	SV Mattersburg
Lafata 54'; Lasnik 56'	Report	Schmidt 23'

Gerhard Hanappi Stadium, Vienna
Attendance: 15,000
Referee: Gerald Lehner

GK	1	(Hungary) Szabolcs Sáfár
RB	31	(Austria) Joachim Standfest		(substituted off) 45'
CB	3	(Argentina) Fernando Troyansky	Booked
CB	5	(Croatia) Mario Tokić
LB	16	(Austria) Ronald Gërçaliu	Booked
MF	8	(Poland) Arkadiusz Radomski		(substituted off) 46'
MF	15	(France) Jocelyn Blanchard
MF	30	(Slovenia) Milenko Ačimovič	Booked
MF	14	(Austria) Andreas Lasnik
CF	11	(Austria) Hannes Aigner	Booked
CF	4	(Czech Republic) David Lafata		(substituted off) 83'
Substitutes:
RB	22	(Austria) Johannes Ertl		(substituted on) 45'
CF	19	(Czech Republic) Václav Svěrkoš		(substituted on) 46'
CF	17	(Austria) Thomas Pichlmann		(substituted on) 83'
Manager:
(Austria) Georg Zellhofer

GK	1	(Austria) Thomas Borenitsch
RB	26	(Hungary) Csaba Csizmadia
CB	3	(North Macedonia) Goce Sedloski	Booked
CB	13	(Austria) Jürgen Patocka
LB	25	(Austria) Christian Fuchs
MF	27	(Austria) Cem Atan		(substituted off) 80'
MF	5	(Austria) Michael Mörz
MF	10	(Austria) Dietmar Kühbauer
MF	19	(Austria) Markus Schmidt	Booked
CF	12	(Austria) Patrick Bürger		(substituted off) 61'
CF	24	(North Macedonia) Ilčo Naumoski	Booked
Substitutes:
DF	11	(Czech Republic) Miroslav Holeňák		(substituted on) 61'
CF	8	(Germany) Carsten Jancker		(substituted on) 80'
CF	14	(Austria) Marcus Hanikel		(substituted on) 85'
Manager:
(Austria) Franz Lederer

Match rules

- 90 minutes.
- 30 minutes of extra-time if necessary.
- Penalty shootout if scores still level.
