= Kozelsky =

Kozelsky (masculine), Kozelskaya (feminine), or Kozelskoye (neuter) may refer to:

Geography

- Kozelsky District, a district of Kaluga Oblast, Russia
- Kozelsky (rural locality) (Kozelskaya, Kozelskoye), name of several rural localities in Russia
- Kozelsky (volcano), a volcano on Kamchatka Peninsula

People

- Arno Kozelsky (b. 1981), Austrian soccer player
- Kozelsky (family), a princely family of Rurikid stock

Other

- 8229 Kozelský, a main belt asteroid
