= Philipp Netzer =

Austrian footballer

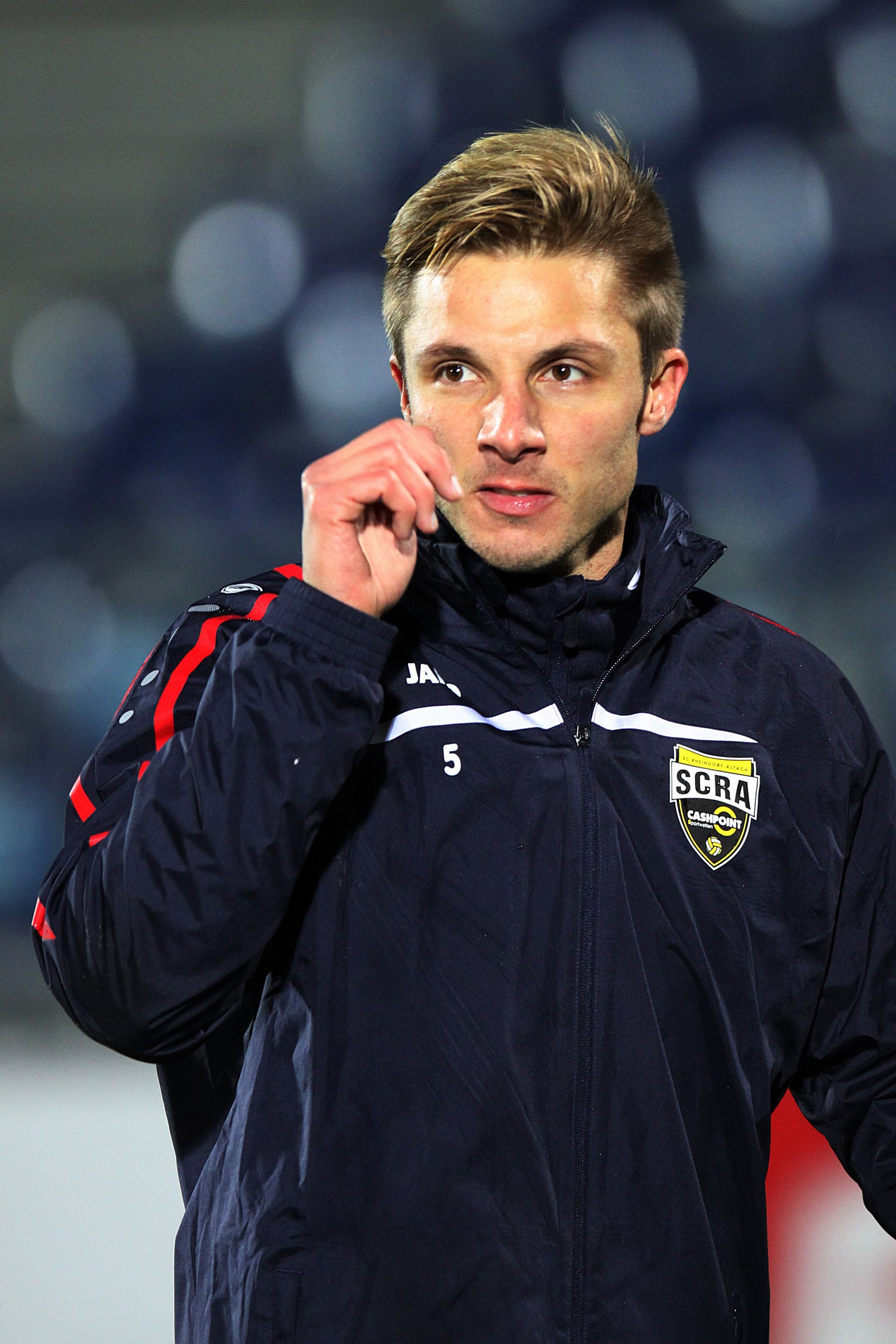
- Netzer in 2014

Personal information
- Date of birth: 2 October 1985 (age 41)
- Place of birth: Bregenz, Austria
- Height: 1.88 m (6 ft 2 in)
- Position: Midfielder

Team information
- Current team: Rheindorf Altach (youth coach)

Youth career
- 1992–2003: SV Lochau
- 2003: BNZ Vorarlberg

Senior career*
Years	Team	Apps	(Gls)
2003–2004	FC Lustenau	24	(0)
2004–2005	Rheindorf Altach	26	(2)
2005–2009	Austria Wien	7	(0)
2005–2009	Austria Wien II	46	(10)
2009–2022	Rheindorf Altach	291	(31)
Total		394	(43)

Managerial career
- 2022–: Rheindorf Altach (youth)
- * Club domestic league appearances and goals

Philipp Netzer (born 2 October 1985) is an Austrian professional football coach and a former player. He is a youth coach of the SC Rheindorf Altach juniors.

== Career ==
Netzer began his career with BNZ Vorarlberg. In 2003, he joined the first team of the second division club FC Lustenau 07, and in 2004 he moved on to league rivals Rheindorf Altach. In 2005 Netzer, joined the second team of Austria Wien. He would make his debut in the Austrian Bundesliga on 22 October 2006 in a 4-0 loss to Red Bull Salzburg. Further appearances with the first and second team followed, and he also made two appearances in the UEFA Cup, with his European debut coming on 30 November 2006 in a 1–0 home loss to Sparta Prague. In summer 2009, his contract with Austria expired.

Ahead of the 2009–10 season, Netzer returned to Rheindorf Altach, who had been relegated from the Bundesliga. He won promotion back to the Bundesliga with the team in 2014 and reached the qualifying stage for the 2015–16 UEFA Europa League after a successful 2014–15 Bundesliga season, but the team were eliminated in the play-off round after a loss on aggregate to Belenenses. The 2017–18 UEFA Europa League qualifiers also ended in the play-off round, as they were knocked out Israeli club Maccabi Tel Aviv with an overall score of 3–2.

On 24 July 2020, Netzer extended his expiring contract, which saw him add a season with the Rheindorf Altach first team, as the deal also opened for the opportunity to continue his career with the club beyond his retirement.

Having spent 13 seasons with Rheindorf Altach, Netzer announced his retirement from football following the 2021–22 season. Instead, he became head coach of the club's reserves together with Louis Ngwat-Mahop.

== Honours ==
Austria Wien

- Austrian Cup: 2006–07, 2008–09

Rheindorf Altach

- Austrian First League: 2013–14
