= Sebastian Brandner =

Austrian goalkeeper coach

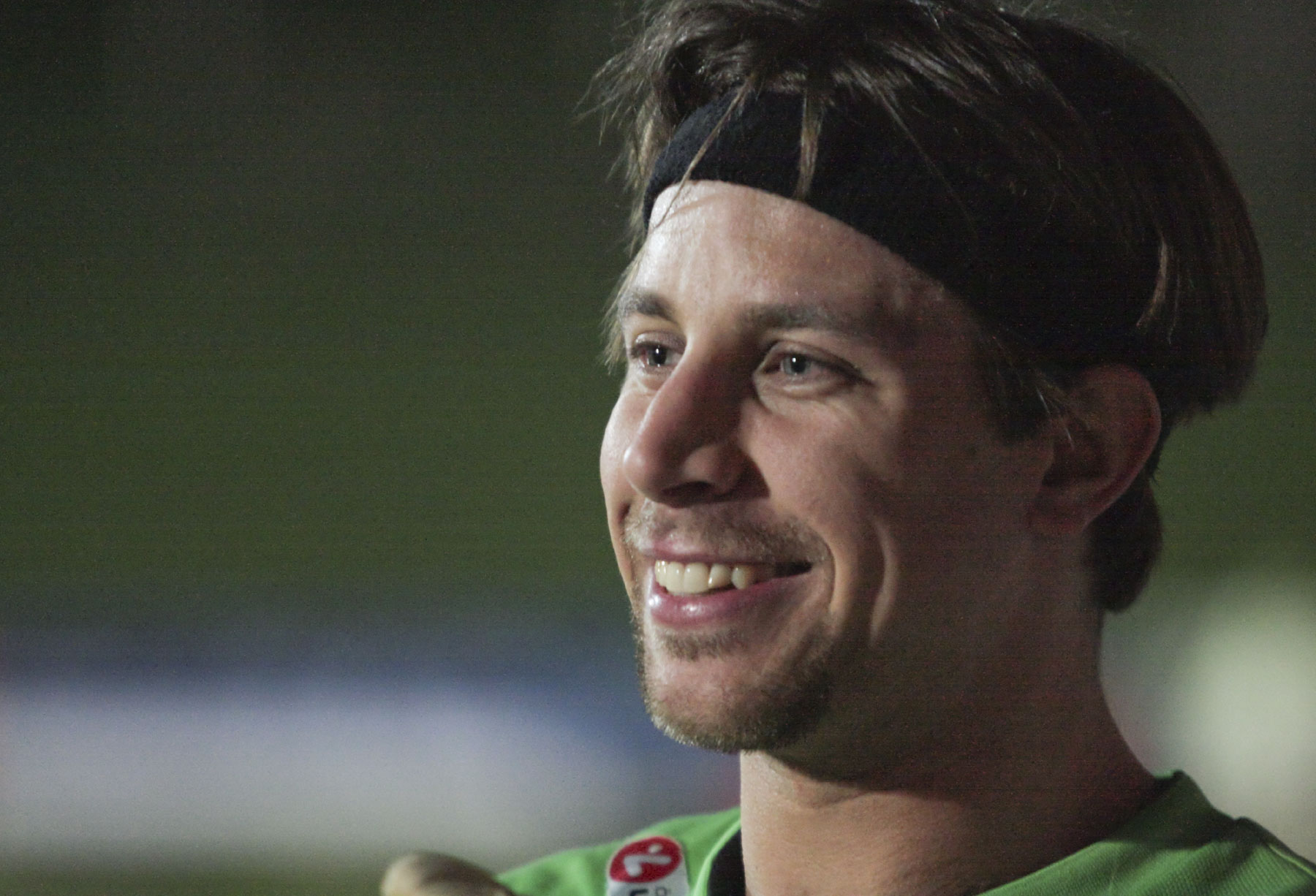

Personal information
- Full name: Sebastian Brandner
- Date of birth: 8 February 1983 (age 43)
- Place of birth: Bludenz, Austria
- Position: Goalkeeper

Team information
- Current team: SC Rheindorf Altach (goalkeeper coach)

Senior career*
Years	Team	Apps	(Gls)
2000–2002	Dornbirner SV		
2002–2006	FC Lustenau 07		
2006–2007	SV Donau		
2007–2010	First Vienna FC		
2010–2016	SC Rheindorf Altach II	39	(0)
2010–2016	SC Rheindorf Altach	7	(0)

Managerial career
- 2016–: SC Rheindorf Altach (goalkeeper coach)
- * Club domestic league appearances and goals

Sebastian Brandner (born 8 February 1983) is an Austrian goalkeeper coach, currently for SC Rheindorf Altach, and former footballer.
