= FC Baden =

Association football club

- Full name: Fussballclub Baden 1897
- Founded: 1897; 129 years ago
- Ground: Esp Stadium, Fislisbach, Switzerland
- Capacity: 7,000 (1,000 seated)
- Chairman: Heinz Gassmann
- Manager: Michael Winsauer
- League: 1st League Classic
- 2024–25: Promotion League, 17th of 18 (relegated)
- Website: https://www.fcbaden.ch
Home colours	Away colours

Fussballclub Baden 1897, simply known as FC Baden, is a Swiss football club based in Baden, Canton Aargau, which is a short distance from Zürich. It was founded in 1897. FC Baden has a total of 22 different teams at age levels, including five women's teams. They currently play in the 1st League Classic from 2025 to 2026, the fourth tier of Swiss football after relegation from Promotion League in 2024–25.

== History ==
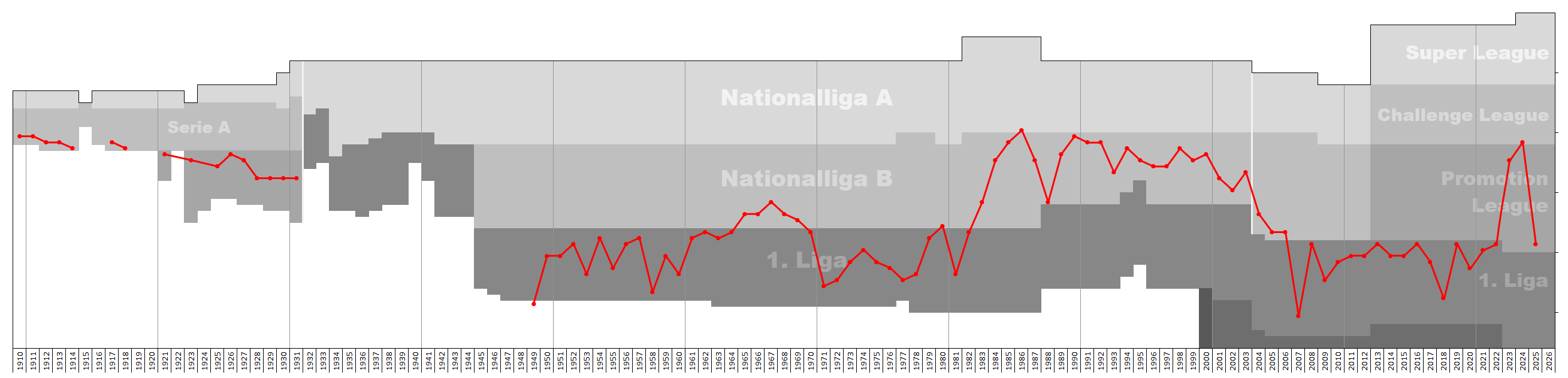
Chart of FC Baden table positions in the Swiss football league system

In the 1985–86 season, the club participated in the Swiss Super League but were relegated after finishing last, coming 16th out of 16. After that time the club was in the Swiss Challenge League where they stayed until relegation in the 2005–06 season. Since that time the club have been in the third tier of the Swiss football pyramid. They narrowly lost out on promotion back to the Challenge League at the end of the 2007–08 season and spent sixteen years in the league until their promotion in 2022. Because of the Super League's expansion, two automatic promotion spots existed in the 2022-23 Promotion League season. Baden finished in third, but still got promoted as league winners FC Luzern II were not allowed to get promoted. In the Challenge League, Baden strengthened their squad considerably while retaining most of their promoted squad. As the only semi-professional team in the league, they were able to fight against relegation in the first half of the season, but a collapse in the second half led to relegation. In the subsequent season, suboptimal transfer practices led to Baden fighting against relegation yet again, despite their form improving later on in the campaign, they finished the 2024-25 season in 17th, returning to the 1. Liga Classic.

== Current squad ==
As of 7 April, 2026. Note: Flags indicate national team as defined under FIFA eligibility rules; some limited exceptions apply. Players may hold more than one non-FIFA nationality.

No.	Pos.	Nation	Player
1	GK	SUI	Lars Hunn
2	DF	SUI	Sven Kunz
4	DF	SUI	Elmedin Fazlic
5	DF	SUI	Elis Isufi
6	MF	SUI	Jan Kalt
7	MF	SUI	Daniele Romano
8	MF	GER	Ali Benelmir
9	FW	ITA	Fabio Capone
10	FW	ITA	Davide Giampà (captain)
12	MF	SUI	Emin Zeric
14	DF	SUI	Joël Brack
16	DF	SUI	Fabrice Suter
18	GK	SUI	Mathias Altermatt

No.	Pos.	Nation	Player
19	FW	SUI	Nenad Zivkovic
20	MF	SUI	Teodor Popov
21	FW	SUI	Younes Oussadit
22	FW	SUI	Andrin Ulli
23	MF	ITA	Mattia Bertelle
24	DF	ANG	Higor Kolua
25	MF	SUI	Alessandro Barletta
26	FW	SUI	Diego Rhein
27	MF	SUI	Ensar Huruglica
28	MF	SUI	Nathan Mbengi
29	DF	SUI	Patrick Muff
30	GK	MKD	Stefan Mitrev
43	DF	SUI	Tim Senti

== Stadium ==
FC Baden play their home games at the Esp Stadium in Fislisbach which is a few miles outside of Baden. The capacity of the stadium is 7,000, of which 1,000 is seating and the rest is terracing.

== Notable former players ==
- (Croatia) Mladen Petrić
