= Marcus Hanikel =

Austrian footballer

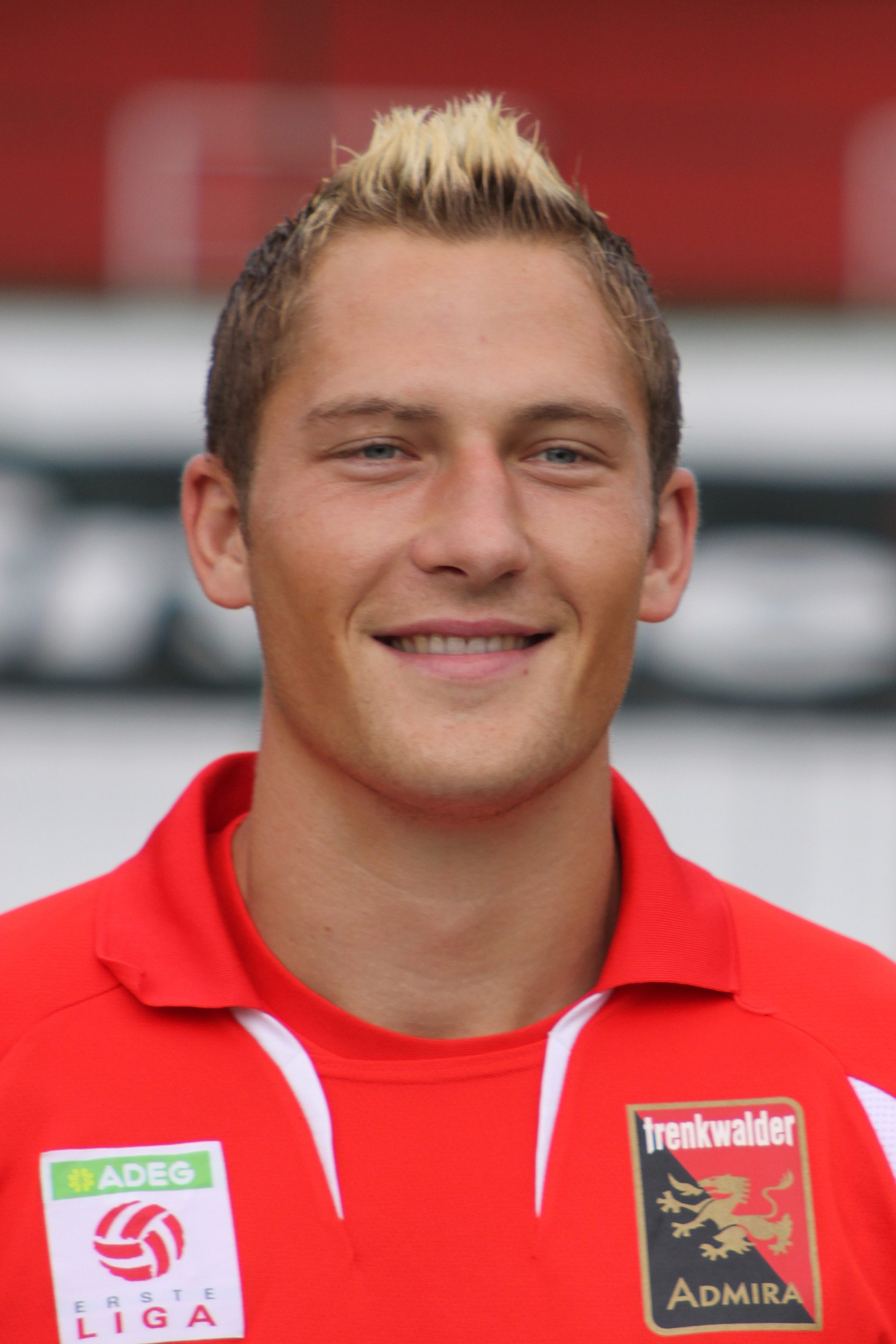
- Hanikel in 2009

Personal information
- Date of birth: 10 May 1983 (age 43)
- Place of birth: Vienna, Austria
- Position: Forward

Youth career
- –1997: Favoritner AC
- 1997–2000: FC Stadlau

Senior career*
Years	Team	Apps	(Gls)
2000–2001	FC Stadlau	24	(5)
2001–2002	WSG Wattens		
2002–2004	Wattens/Wacker	5	(0)
2004	Lustenau 07	2	(0)
2004–2005	SC Untersiebenbrunn	32	(13)
2005–2007	SV Mattersburg	44	(3)
2007–2008	Admira Wacker	9	(5)
2008	SK Schwadorf	12	(4)
2008–2011	Admira Wacker	66	(29)
2011–2012	SV Grödig	16	(0)
2012–2013	SV St. Margrethen	6	(2)
2013–2014	ASK Bad Vöslau	27	(9)
2014–2016	FCM Traiskirchen		
- * Club domestic league appearances and goals

Marcus Hanikel (born 10 March 1983) is a retired Austrian footballer.
