= Manuel Rödl =

Austrian footballer

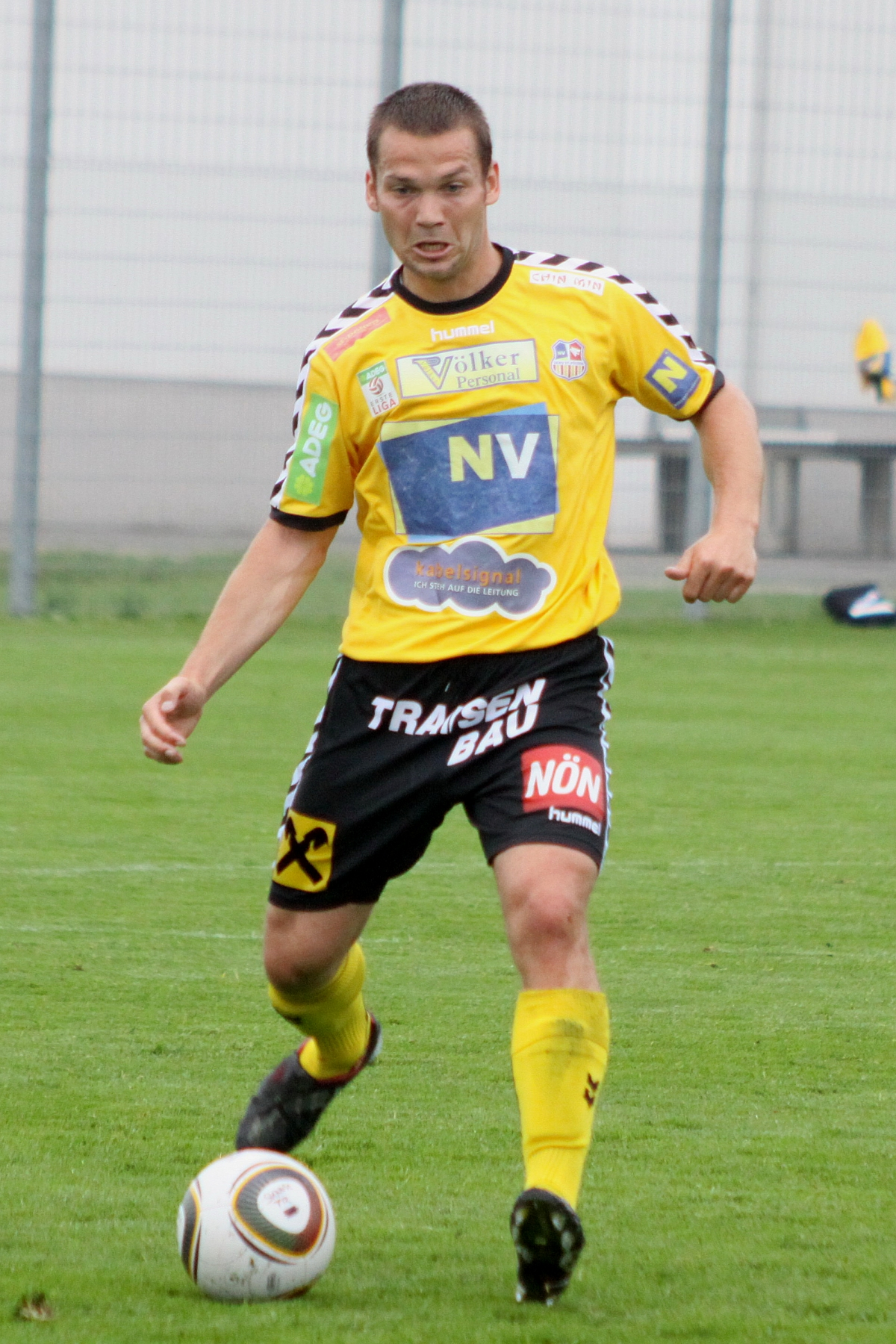

Personal information
- Full name: Manuel Rödl
- Date of birth: 23 September 1982 (age 44)
- Place of birth: Austria
- Height: 1.81 m (5 ft 11 in)
- Position: Defender

Team information
- Current team: SV Bürmoos
- Number: 19

Youth career
- 1991–1996: 1. Oberndorfer SK
- 1996–2002: SV Austria Salzburg

Senior career*
Years	Team	Apps	(Gls)
2002–2003	SV Austria Salzburg	0	(0)
2003–2004	SC Untersiebenbrunn	11	(0)
2004–2010	FC Lustenau 07	130	(10)
2010–2013	SKN St. Pölten	82	(6)
2013–2015	TSV Neumarkt	47	(4)
2015–	SV Bürmoos		
- * Club domestic league appearances and goals as of 22 October 2015

Manuel Rödl (born 23 September 1982) is an Austrian footballer who currently plays for the SV Bürmoos.
