= Georg Zellhofer =

Austrian footballer and manager

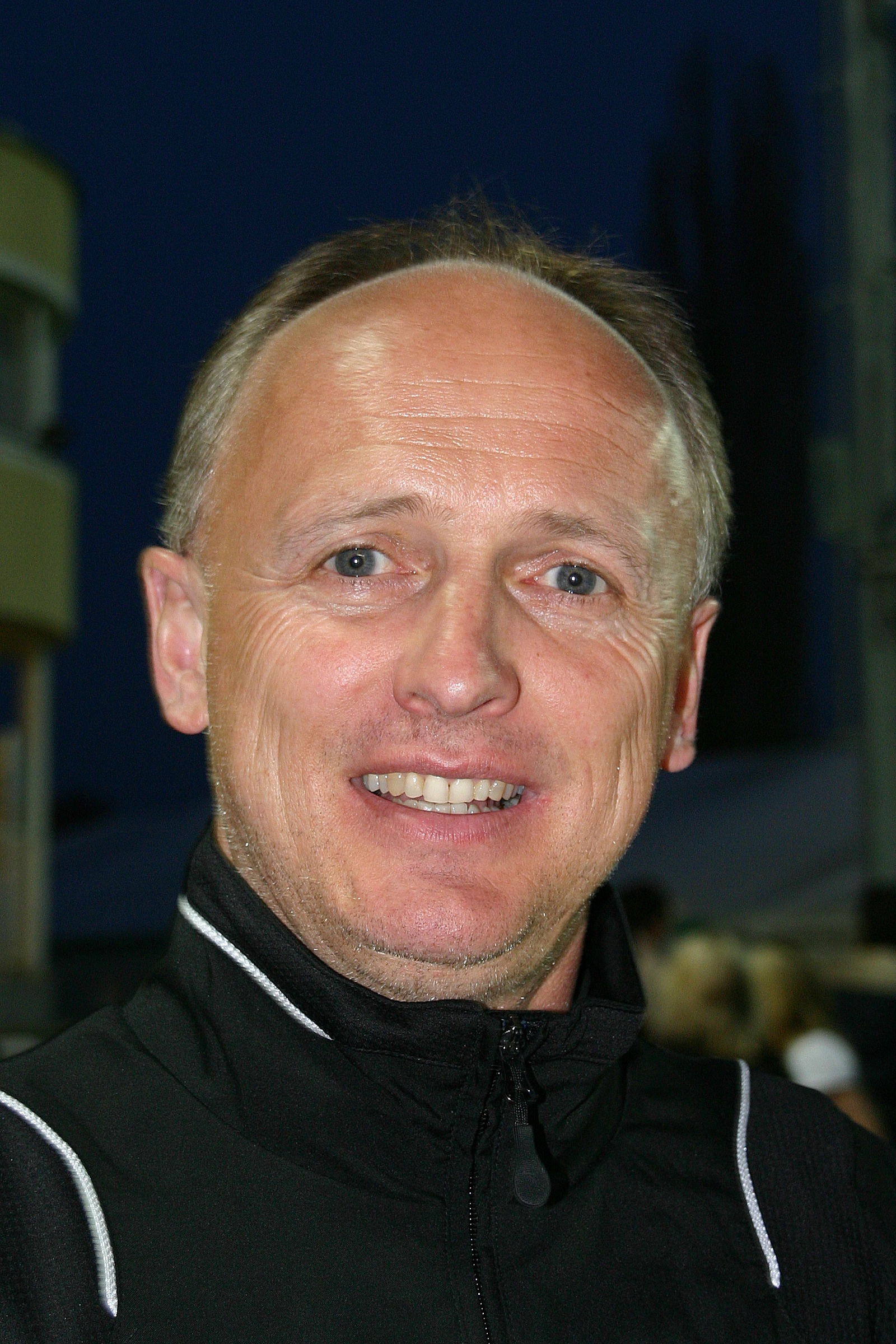

Personal information
- Date of birth: 25 August 1960 (age 66)
- Place of birth: Waidhofen/Ybbs, Austria
- Height: 1.84 m (6 ft 0 in)
- Position: Midfielder

Youth career
- –1980: SK Vorwärts Steyr

Senior career*
Years	Team	Apps	(Gls)
1980–1991	FC Linz	265	(37)
1988–1989	→ SK Sturm Graz (loan)	24	(2)
1991–1992	LASK Linz	16	(3)
Total		305	(42)

Managerial career
- 1996–2005: ASKÖ Pasching
- 2006: SK Rapid Wien
- 2006–2008: FK Austria Wien
- 2008: SV Ried
- 2009: SC Rheindorf Altach
- 2010: Bahrain U-23 (Olympic)
- 2010–2011: LASK Linz
- 2013–2019: SC Rheindorf Altach (sporting director)
- 2020–2021: SKN St. Pölten (sporting director)
- 2021: SKN St. Pölten (caretaker)
- * Club domestic league appearances and goals

Georg Zellhofer (born 25 August 1960) is a football manager and a former player from Austria.

Zellhofer managed SK Rapid Wien for eight months during 2006. Shortly after, he was appointed manager of FK Austria Wien where he would win the 2006–07 Austrian Cup. Brief spells at SV Ried and SC Rheindorf Altach followed. Zellhofer briefly managed the Bahrain under-23 national football team, but left immediately prior to the 2010 Asian Games.
