= Daniel Wolf (footballer) =

Austrian footballer

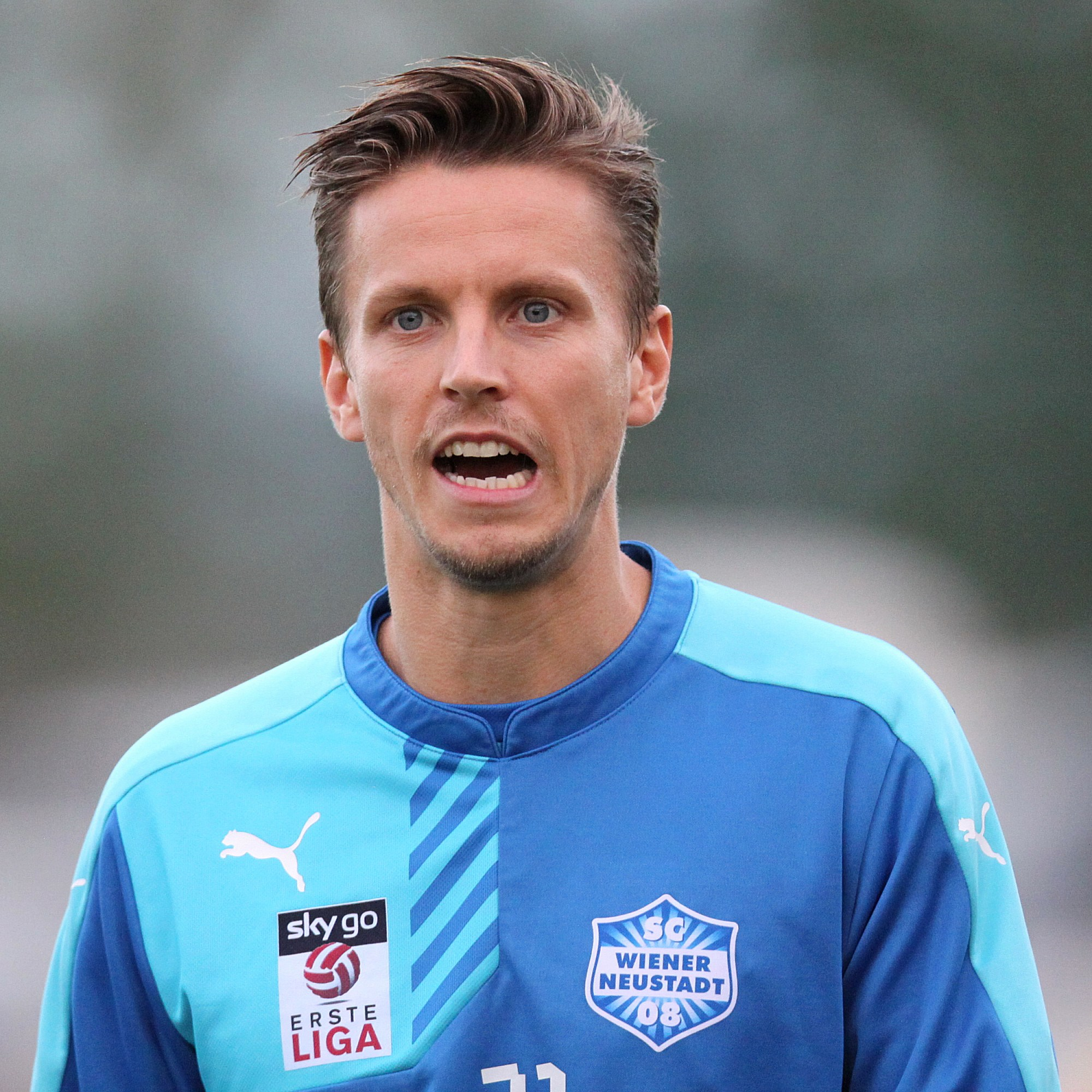

Personal information
- Full name: Daniel Wolf
- Date of birth: 4 May 1985 (age 41)
- Place of birth: Vienna, Austria
- Height: 1.82 m (6 ft 0 in)
- Position: Midfielder

Youth career
- 1991–2003: Admira Wacker

Senior career*
Years	Team	Apps	(Gls)
2002–2006	Admira Wacker	32	(1)
2004	→ LASK (loan)	3	(0)
2006–2007	Pistoiese	26	(2)
2007–2011	Piacenza	47	(0)
2011	Admira Wacker	0	(0)
2011–2013	Wiener Neustadt	49	(0)
2014	TSV Hartberg	13	(2)
2014–2015	Austria Lustenau	19	(0)
2015–2016	Wiener Neustadt	23	(1)
2016–2017	SC Ritzing	25	(5)
2017–2018	Karabakh Wien	26	(2)
2018–2023	SC Ritzing	82	(6)

International career
2006–2007	Austria U21	8	(0)
- * Club domestic league appearances and goals as of 21:37, 7 March 2023 (UTC)

Daniel Wolf (born 4 May 1985 in Vienna) is an Austrian former association footballer who played for SC Ritzing.
