= Sascha Pichler =

Austrian footballer

Personal information
- Full name: Sascha Pichler
- Date of birth: 31 January 1986 (age 40)
- Place of birth: Vienna, Austria
- Height: 1.83 m (6 ft 0 in)
- Position: Striker

Team information
- Current team: 1. FC Bisamberg; (Manager & sports director)

Youth career
- 1992–2001: Rapid Wien

Senior career*
Years	Team	Apps	(Gls)
2002–2004	Austria Wien	1	(0)
2004–2005	Fiorentina	0	(0)
2005–2010	LASK	30	(4)
2008	→ SC Schwanenstadt (loan)	1	(0)
2010–2011	Waidhofen/Ybbs	10	(2)
2011–2012	SV Horn	27	(6)
2012–2013	Ober-Grafendorf	13	(4)
2013–2015	ASK Kottingbrunn	30	(15)
2015–2019	SV Stripfing	53	(6)
2019–2020	1. FC Bisamberg	13	(1)

International career
2002–2003	Austria U17	22	(13)
2005	Austria U19	6	(3)

Managerial career
- 2016–2018: SV Stripfing (youth)
- 2017–2018: SV Stripfing II (assistant)
- 2021–2023: 1. FC Bisamberg (assistant)
- 2021–: 1. FC Bisamberg (sports director)
- 2023–: 1. FC Bisamberg
- * Club domestic league appearances and goals

Sascha Pichler (born 31 January 1986) is an Austrian footballer and manager, currently in charge of 1. FC Bisamberg.

== Career ==
=== Club career ===
Pichler came through the Rapid Wien youth ranks, but made his Austrian Bundesliga debut for eternal rivals Austria Wien in 2002–03. He only made one substitute appearance in that title-winning season. He spent a season at Fiorentina but returned to playing action with LASK in Austria's Second Division in 2005 and winning promotion in 2007. Early 2008 he was loaned out to SC Schwanenstadt.

=== Post retirement ===
Already during his time at SV Stripfing, Pichler began to explore the world of coaching when he coached at the club's academy and later also at the club's reserve team.

After playing for 1. FC Bisamberg, he was later hired as assistant coach and sporting director at the club in the summer of 2021. In December 2023, after Rene Hieblinger was fired as manager, Pichler took over the position, which - as before - he would combine with his position as sports director at the club as well.

== Honours ==
- Austrian Football Bundesliga (1):
  - 2003
