= Andreas Lasnik =

Austrian footballer

Personal information
- Full name: Andreas Lasnik
- Date of birth: 9 November 1983 (age 43)
- Place of birth: Voitsberg, Austria
- Height: 1.83 m (6 ft 0 in)
- Position: Midfielder

Youth career
- FK Lankowitz
- ASK Köflach

Senior career*
| Years | Team | Apps | (Gls) |
| 2002–2005 | SV Ried | 89 | (15) |
| 2005–2008 | FK Austria Wien | 76 | (9) |
| 2008–2010 | Alemannia Aachen | 24 | (4) |
| 2010–2011 | Willem II | 33 | (9) |
| 2011–2013 | NAC Breda | 23 | (3) |
| 2013–2014 | Panionios | 25 | (3) |
| 2014–2016 | Kapfenberger SV | 38 | (3) |
| Total | | 308 | (41) |

International career^{‡}
| 2005 | Austria | 1 | (0) |
- * Club domestic league appearances and goals as of 23 March 2016 ‡ National team caps and goals as of 3 August 2008

Andreas Lasnik (born 9 November 1983) is a retired Austrian footballer. He now works as a glasses seller.

== Club career ==
Lasnik came up through the youth system of FK Lankowitz. He broke into the professional level in 2001 with ASK Köflach. In 2001, he was signed by SV Ried of the Austrian first division, the Austrian Football Bundesliga. He would appear in over 80 matches with the club and net 14 goals. In 2005, he was signed by FK Austria Wien where he played until the end of the 2007–08 season. After that season, he signed a three-year contract for the German Second division club Alemannia Aachen After the end of his contract on 30 June 2010, he left Alemannia Aachen. Lasnik signed on 26 June 2010 with Dutch club Willem II Tilburg.

== International career ==
He made his debut for Austria in an October 2005 friendly match against England, coming on for the last ten minutes of his only international so far.

== Honours ==
Austria Wien

- Austrian Football Bundesliga: 2005–06
- Austrian Cup: 2005–06, 2006–07

SV Ried

- Austrian Football First League: 2004–05
