= Sidinei =

Brazilian footballer

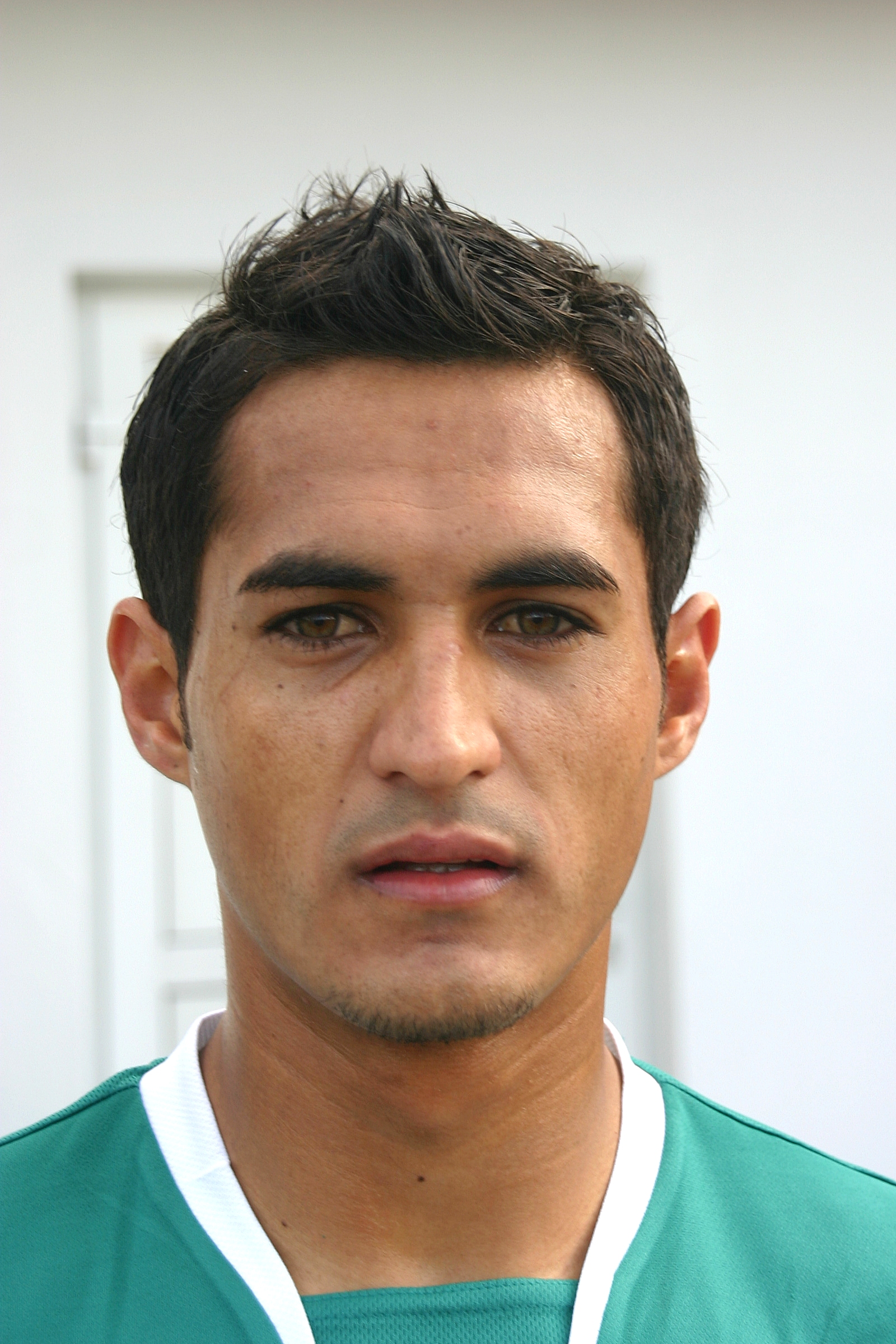

Personal information
- Full name: Sidinei Antonio Zeferino De Oliveira
- Date of birth: 28 June 1984 (age 42)
- Place of birth: Salgado Filho
- Height: 1.70 m (5 ft 7 in)
- Position: Midfielder

Team information
- Current team: SC Bregenz
- Number: 10

Senior career*
Years	Team	Apps	(Gls)
2004–2005	CA Metropolitano		
2005–2008	FC Lustenau	68	(25)
2008–2012	Austria Lustenau	59	(11)
2012–2013	SC Bregenz	13	(7)
2013–2014	SC Brühl	16	(2)
2014–2016	FC Wolfurt	29	(11)
2016–	SC Bregenz	1	(0)
- * Club domestic league appearances and goals as of 22 March 2016

Sidinei Antonio Zeferino De Oliveira (born 28 June 1984), known as Sidinei, is a football midfielder from Brazil currently playing for the SC Bregenz.

== Career ==
He has previously played for CA Metropolitano, FC Lustenau, Austria Lustenau, SC Brühl and FC Wolfurt.
