= Harun Erbek =

Austrian-Turkish football midfielder

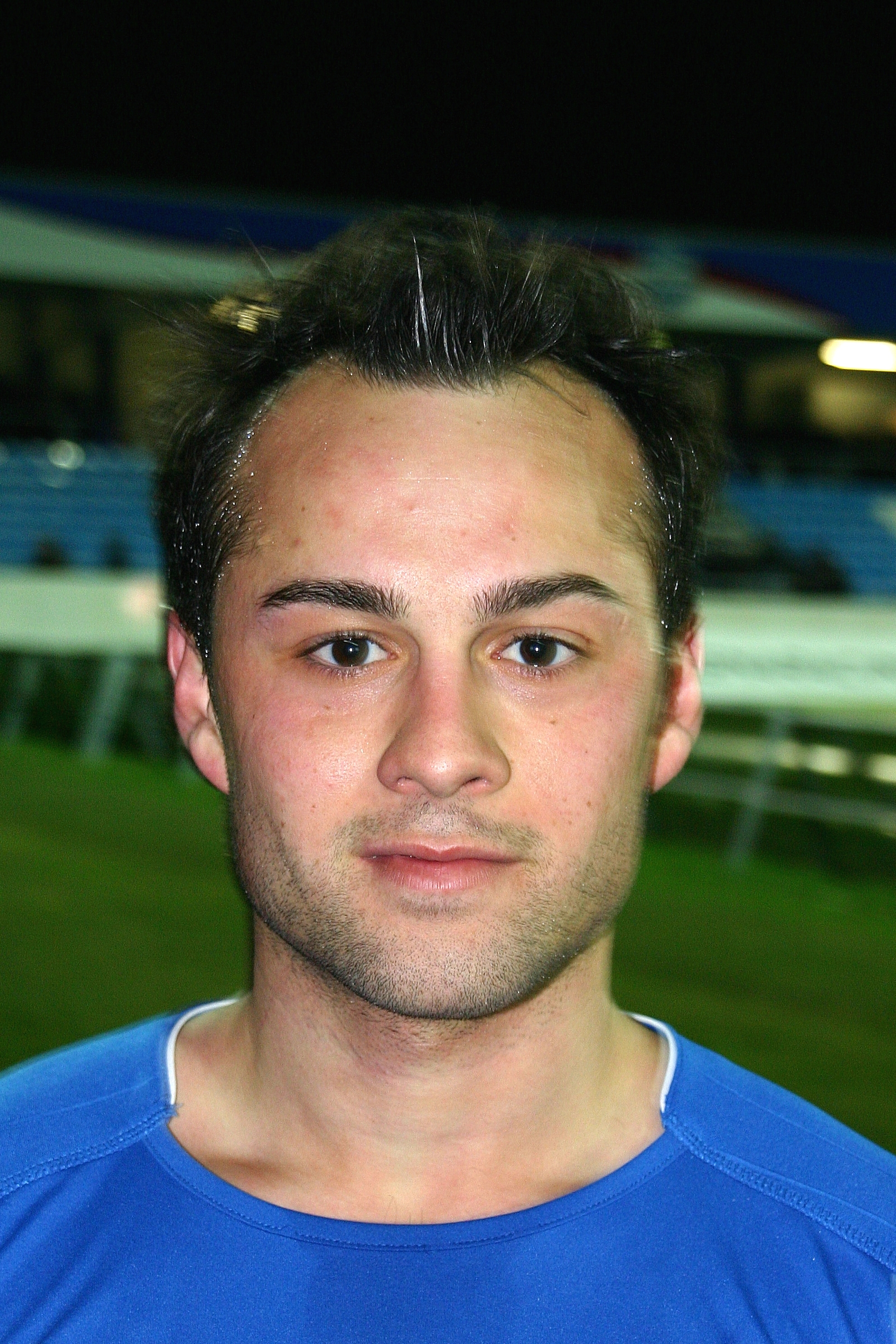

Personal information
- Full name: Harun Erbek
- Date of birth: 8 June 1986 (age 40)
- Place of birth: Bregenz, Austria
- Height: 1.63 m (5 ft 4 in)
- Positions: Left back; left midfielder

Team information
- Current team: FC Wolfurt

Youth career
- 2001–2003: Viktoria Bregenz
- 2003–2005: AKA Vorarlberg

Senior career*
Years	Team	Apps	(Gls)
2005–2007	Austria Lustenau	32	(4)
2007–2008	SV Ried	33	(1)
2008	Kayserispor	1	(0)
2009	Wiener Neustadt	5	(0)
2009–2010	FC Dornbirn	23	(1)
2010–2011	Austria Lustenau	31	(2)
2011–2013	SC Rheindorf Altach	56	(1)
2013–2014	SV Horn	34	(2)
2014–2016	LASK Linz	40	(1)
2017–	FC Wolfurt		

International career
2003–2004	Austria U-17	5	(0)
2004–2005	Austria U-18	5	(0)
2005–2006	Austria U-19	3	(0)
2007–2008	Austria U21	17	(1)
- * Club domestic league appearances and goals as of 18 September 2015

Harun Erbek (born 8 June 1986) is a Turkish-Austrian football midfielder who plays for FC Wolfurt.

== Club career ==
Erbek came through the youth system at FC Lustenau 1907, he officially joined the club on 1 July 2005 and joined SV Ried on 7 June 2007, where he only made one appearance before moving to the Turkish League to Kayserispor in 2008. He left in January 2009 the Turkish side Kayserispor and signed with FC Magna.

== International ==
He has been called up to the Austria UEFA European Under-21 Championship Qualifying Squad, where he has seven caps and one goal.

== Personal ==
His brother Ibrahim plays for FC Lustenau 07.
