= David Witteveen =

Austrian footballer (born 1985)

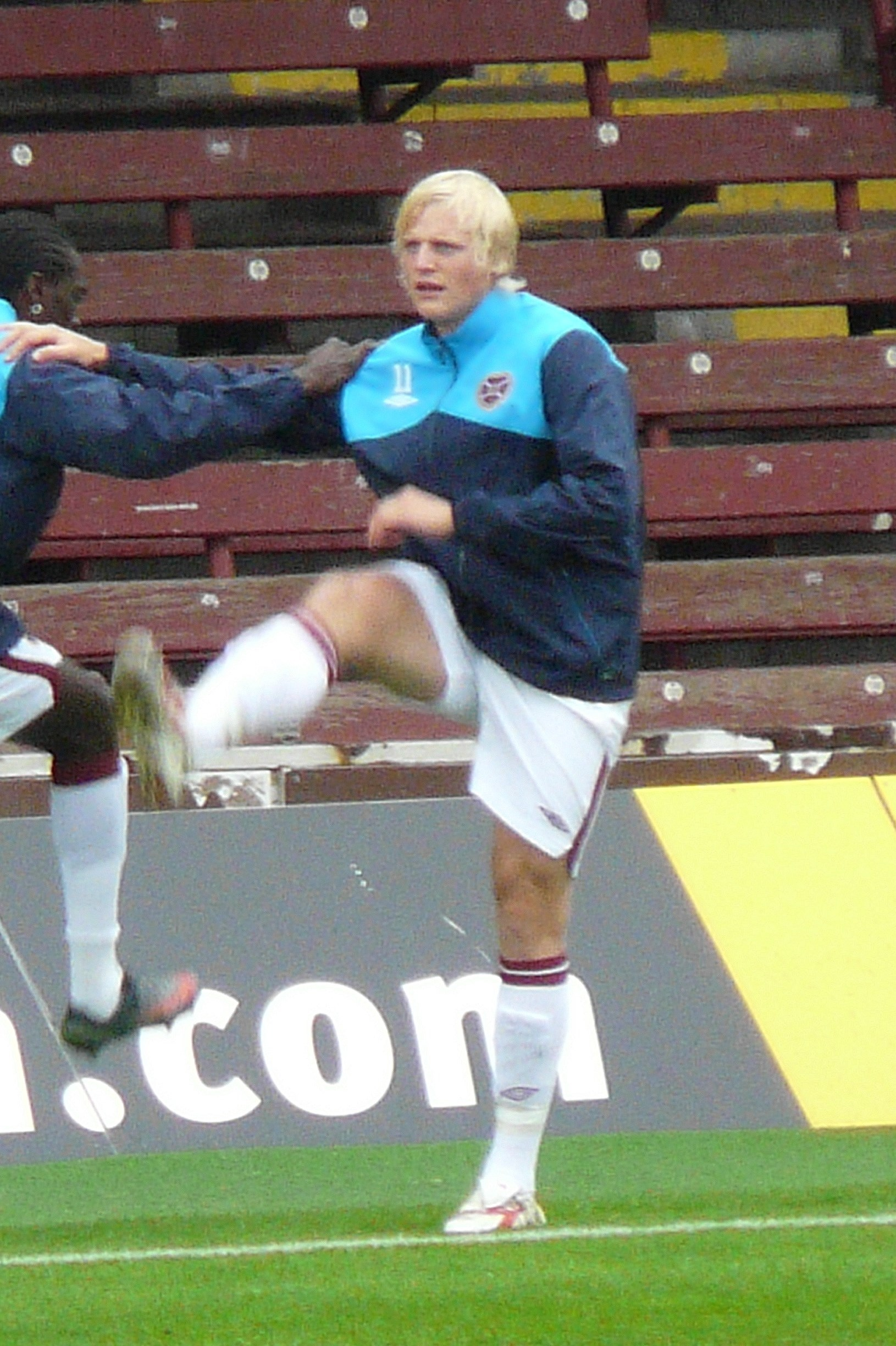

Personal information
- Full name: David Witteveen
- Date of birth: 5 May 1985 (age 41)
- Place of birth: Varese, Italy
- Height: 1.90 m (6 ft 3 in)
- Position: Striker

Team information
- Current team: SV Lackenbach
- Number: 9

Youth career
- 1991–1995: ATSV Mattighofen
- 1995–2003: SV Spittal
- 2003: → SV Lendorf (loan)

Senior career*
Years	Team	Apps	(Gls)
2003–2006	SV Spittal	62	(16)
2006–2009	Red Bull Salzburg II	25	(7)
2008–2009	→ WAC St. Andrä (loan)	28	(14)
2009–2010	Heart of Midlothian	10	(1)
2010	→ Greenock Morton (loan)	9	(5)
2010	→ Dundee (loan)	5	(1)
2011	Stirling Albion (trialist)	2	(1)
2011	SV Horn	0	(0)
2011–2012	FC Lustenau	21	(7)
2012–2013	SV Grödig	31	(17)
2013–2014	Wiener Neustadt	22	(2)
2014–2015	Kapfenberger SV	24	(10)
2015–2021	Ritzing	137	(96)
2022–	SV Lackenbach	29	(23)

Managerial career
- 2016–2017: SC Oberpullendorf (youth)
- 2017–2018: Ritzing (assistant)
- 2017–2019: Ritzing II
- * Club domestic league appearances and goals as of 18:00, 12 March 2023 (UTC)

David Witteveen (born 5 May 1985) is an Austrian footballer. He plays as a striker and is currently playing for SV Lackenbach.

== Career ==
Witteveen had spells at Austrian sides Red Bull Salzburg and WAC St. Andrä. He played for Salzburg's second string in the Austrian Erste Liga and for St. Andrä in the Regionalliga Mitte.

Witteveen signed for Scottish Premier League side Hearts in July 2009. During the week leading up to his signing, the player had participated in friendly matches during their pre-season tour of Germany. He scored his only goal for Hearts in a 2–1 defeat to Rangers, their first home game of the 2009–10 season.

Witteveen did not make any first team appearances for Hearts after Jim Jefferies returned as manager in January 2010. He was loaned to First Division side Greenock Morton in March 2010. On 3 April 2010, he scored a hat trick for Morton in a 3–3 draw against Queen of the South. He continued with goals against Dundee and Ross County.

On 27 August 2010, Witteveen joined another First Division side, Dundee, on a three-month loan deal.

After completing his loan at Dundee, he began negotiating his exit from Tynecastle and was in discussions with Major League Soccer officials about a potential move to the United States.

After Stirling Albion were hit by an illness crisis, he agreed to play for them as one of their two permitted trialists on 2 January 2011 in a league match against Falkirk. He scored for Stirling in this game.

In January 2011, Witteveen returned home to sign for Austrian Regional League East side SV Horn.

On 24 June 2011, Witteveen joined Austrian second division side FC Lustenau, he played there for a season before joining SV Grödig. After a series of good performances with SV Grödig, he was offered a contract from Austrian Bundesliga side SC Wiener Neustadt, and agreed to a two-year deal in June 2013.

After just one season he was released and moved to Kapfenberger SV. Despite scoring 10 goals in 24 league games for Kapfenberger, he was released and signed for Ritzing.

In January 2022, he moved to SV Lackenbach.
