= Thomas Pichlmann =

Austrian footballer

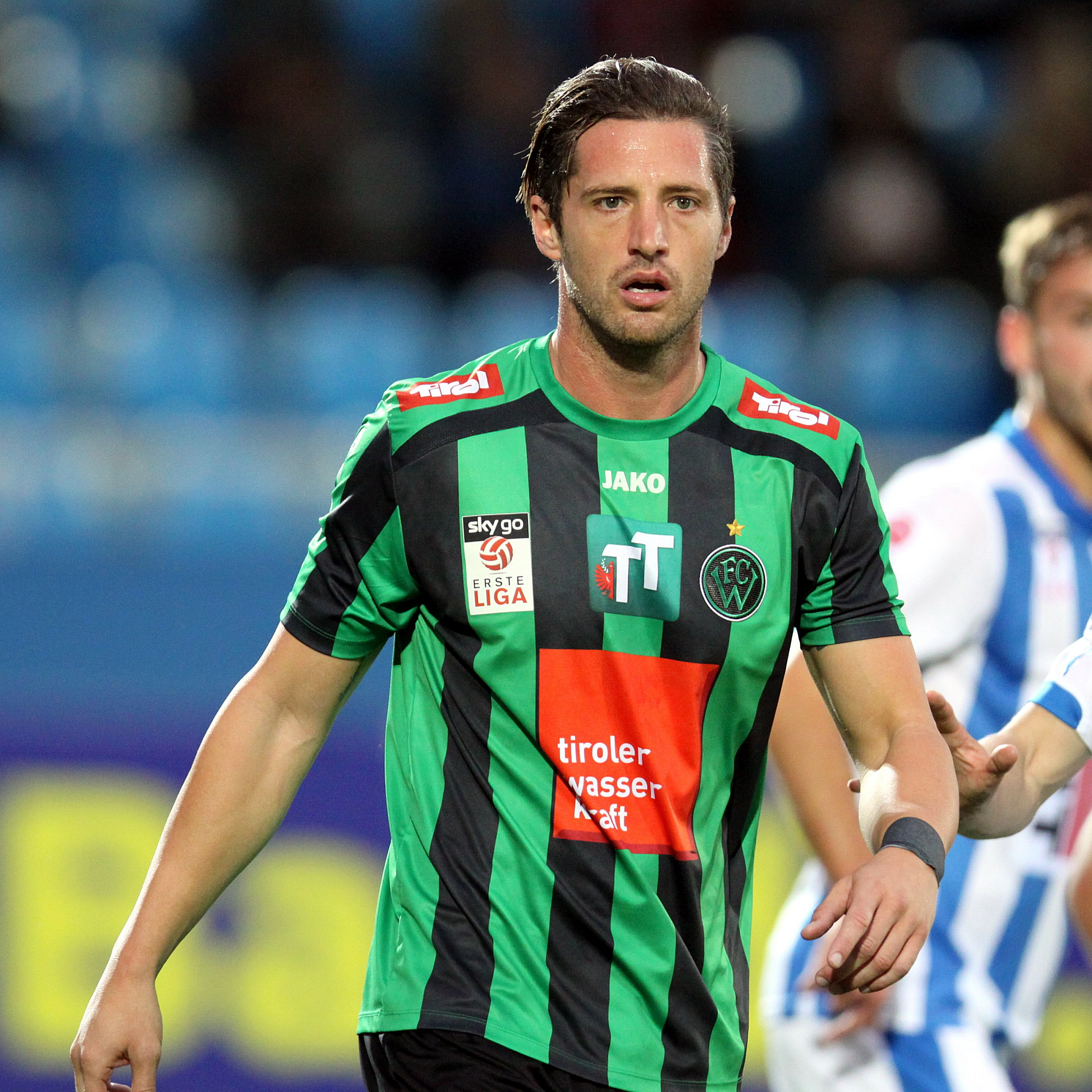
- Pichlmann in 2015

Personal information
- Full name: Thomas Pichlmann
- Date of birth: 24 April 1981 (age 45)
- Place of birth: Vienna, Austria
- Height: 1.88 m (6 ft 2 in)
- Position: Striker

Youth career
- Vösendorf

Senior career*
Years	Team	Apps	(Gls)
1999–2000	Rapid Wien	2	(0)
2000–2001	First Vienna	19	(2)
2001–2003	Leoben	61	(22)
2004–2006	Pasching	76	(18)
2006–2007	Austria Wien	24	(3)
2008–2010	Grosseto	61	(17)
2010–2013	Verona	52	(12)
2012–2013	→ Spezia (loan)	21	(1)
2013–2014	Wiener Neustadt	39	(10)
2014–2015	Grosseto	32	(10)
2015–2017	Wacker Innsbruck	39	(24)

International career
2005	Austria	2	(0)
- * Club domestic league appearances and goals as of 31 January 2017

Thomas Pichlmann (born 24 April 1981) is an Austrian footballer, who last played as a striker for Innsbruck.

== Club career ==
Pichlmann first made his name at Second Division DSV Leoben before moving to top flight outfit SV Pasching. In 2006, he joined Austria Wien, winning the domestic cup final in which he was a late substitute. He joined Grosseto of Serie B in the middle of the 2007–2008 season, after he had just played 1 game for the Austria Wien senior side earlier that season due to injury.

On 31 August 2010 he left for Verona for €350,000 transfer fee in 3-year contract. On 15 July 2012 he was signed by Serie B club Spezia.

Pichlmann returned to Austria in summer 2013. He played 5 out of first 6 games of 2014–15 Austrian Football Bundesliga, however on 28 August 2014 he returned to Italy for former club Grosseto, now a Serie C club.

== International career ==
He made his international debut for Austria on 8 February 2005 in a friendly match against Cyprus.

== Honours ==
Austria Wien

- Austrian Cup: 2006–07
