= Michael Winsauer =

Austrian footballer

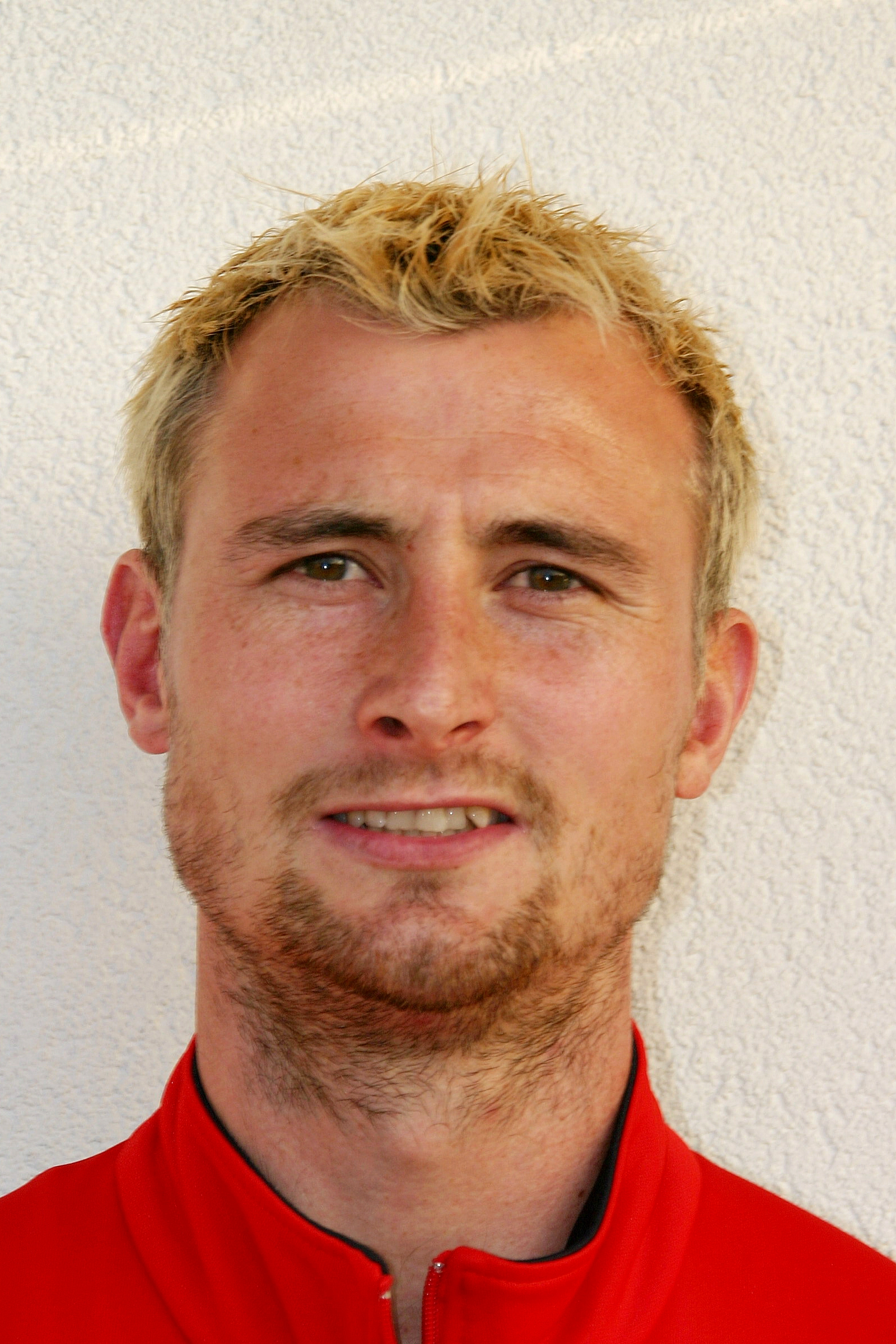
- Michael Winsauer in 2009

Personal information
- Date of birth: 6 August 1982 (age 44)
- Place of birth: St. Johann in Tirol, Austria
- Height: 1.87 m (6 ft 1 1/2 in)
- Position: Defender

Team information
- Current team: FC Sarmenstorf (Manager)

Youth career
- 1989–1991: FC Elektro Achorner Reith
- 1991–1992: SC Kirchberg
- 1992–1993: FC Elektro Achorner Reith
- 1993–1997: SK St. Johann
- 1997–2001: AKA Tirol

Senior career*
Years	Team	Apps	(Gls)
2001–2005	SV Wörgl	108	(1)
2005–2006	Schwanenstadt	13	(1)
2006–2007	Lustenau 07	11	(1)
2007–2008	Schwanenstadt	19	(2)
2008	Parndorf	10	(0)
2008–2009	Vöcklabrucker SC	15	(2)
2009–2010	Team Wellington	16	(0)
2010–2014	Wohlen	114	(6)

International career
2002	Austria U-21	2	(0)

Managerial career
- 2017–2018: Wohlen (U-23 assistant)
- 2019–: FC Sarmenstorf
- * Club domestic league appearances and goals

Michael Winsauer (born 6 August 1982) is an Austrian retired football defender and current manager of FC Sarmenstorf.

Besides Austria, Winsauer has played in New Zealand and Switzerland. He ended his career after the 2013–14 season.

== Coaching career ==
In the summer 2017, Winsauer was appointed assistant coach of FC Wohlen's U-23 team. He left the position at the end of the season.

In June 2019, Winsauer took charge of Swiss club FC Sarmenstorf.
