= Marko Vujic =

Austrian footballer (born 1984)

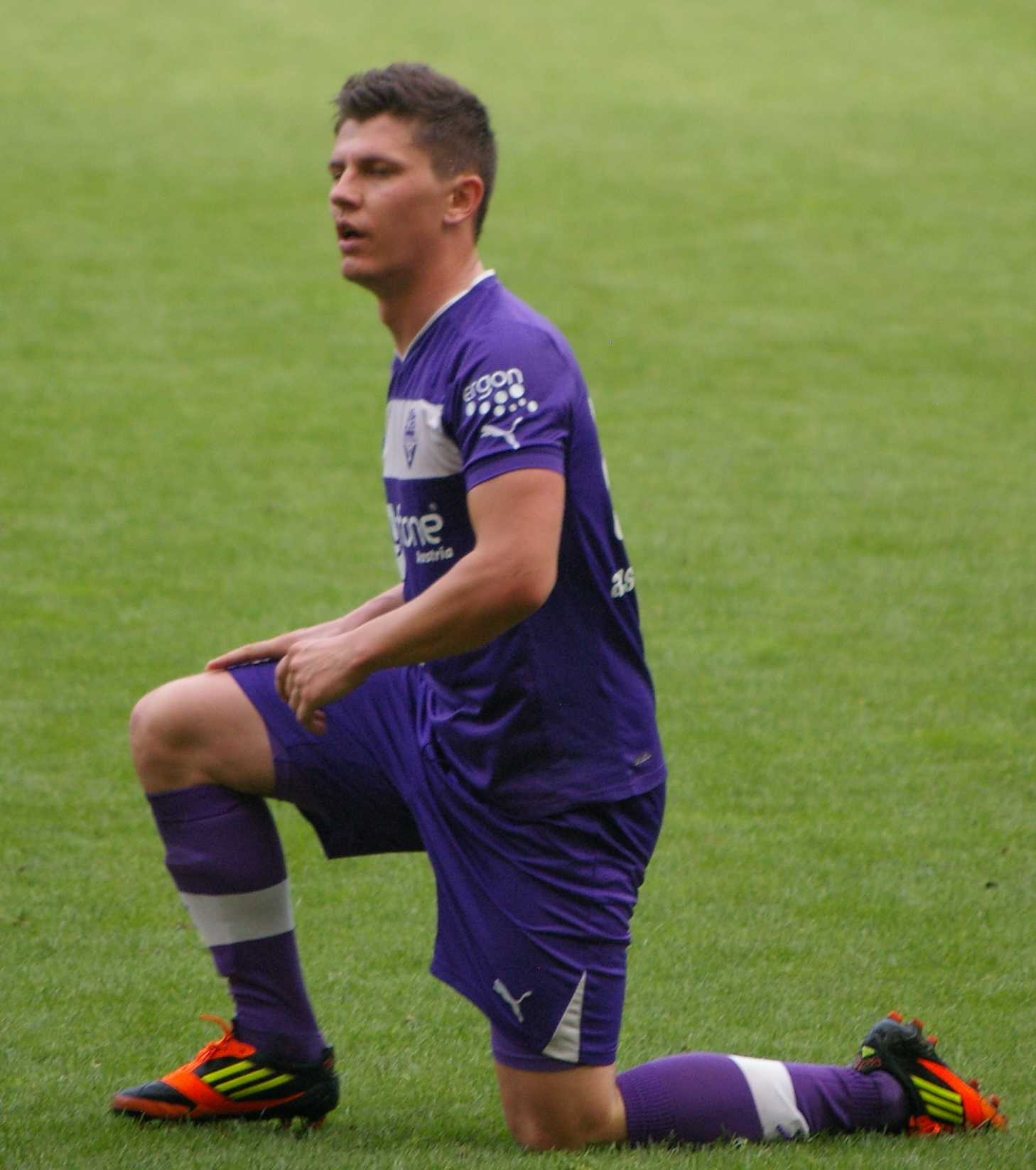
- Vujic with Austria Salzburg

Personal information
- Date of birth: 21 February 1984 (age 42)
- Place of birth: Zenica, Yugoslavia
- Height: 1.78 m (5 ft 10 in)
- Position: Striker

Senior career*
Years	Team	Apps	(Gls)
2001–2003	LASK	5	(0)
2003–2004	FC Blau-Weiß Linz		
2004	KV Mechelen		
2005	FC Pasching II		
2005–2006	SC Schwanenstadt	8	(0)
2006–2007	Red Bull Salzburg	1	(0)
2006–2009	Red Bull Salzburg Juniors	68	(30)
2009	Egaleo	7	(0)
2010	LASK	4	(0)
2010–2014	Austria Salzburg	109	(90)
2014–2016	Union Mondsee		
- * Club domestic league appearances and goals

Marco Vujic (born 21 February 1984) is an Austrian former professional footballer who played as a striker. Born in Zenica, Bosnia and Herzegovina, Vujic played for LASK, FC Blau-Weiß Linz, KV Mechelen, SV Pasching, SC Schwanenstadt, Red Bull Salzburg, Austria Salzburg and Union Mondsee. He played for Red Bull Salzburg Juniors for three years, making 68 appearances and scoring 30 goals. On 31 July 2009, he signed for two years with Greek team Egaleo F.C. in Beta Ethniki. He signed for Austria Salzburg for the 2010–11 season.
