= Andreas Rauscher =

Austrian footballer and coach

Personal information
- Full name: Andreas Rauscher
- Date of birth: 25 January 1978 (age 48)
- Place of birth: Graz, Austria
- Height: 1.80 m (5 ft 11 in)
- Position: Centre back

Senior career*
Years	Team	Apps	(Gls)
1995–2000	Grazer AK	1	(0)
2000–2008	Gratkorn	110	(8)
2008–2011	Kapfenberg	29	(1)
- * Club domestic league appearances and goals as of 13 October 2011

Andreas Rauscher (born 25 January 1978) is an Austrian former professional association football player and coach. He played as a defender.
