= Markus Schmidt (footballer) =

Austrian footballer

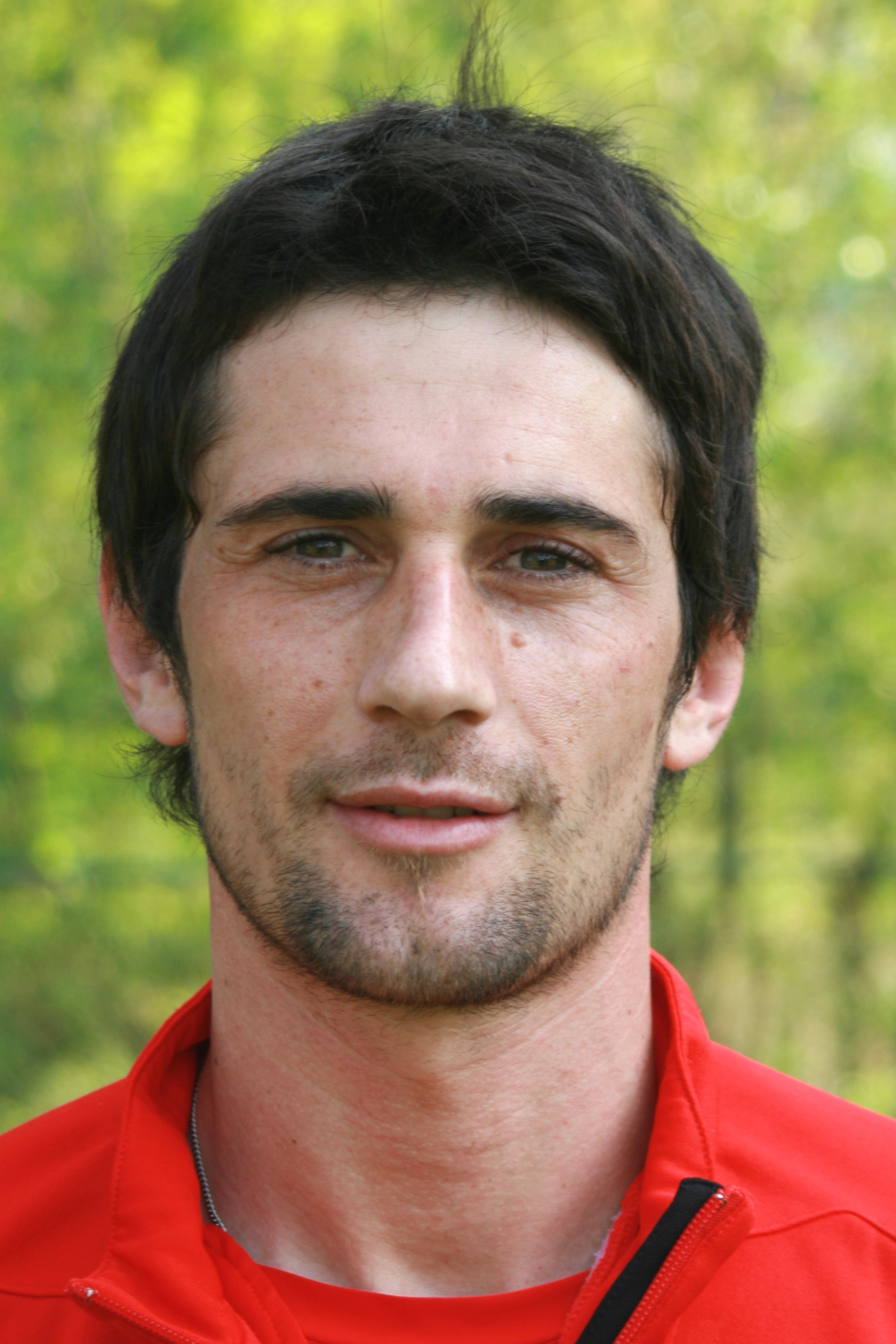

Personal information
- Full name: Markus Schmidt
- Date of birth: October 12, 1977 (age 49)
- Place of birth: Wiener Neustadt, Austria
- Height: 1.90 m (6 ft 3 in)
- Position: Midfielder

Senior career*
Years	Team	Apps	(Gls)
1994–1998	Rohrbach	?	(?)
1998–2012	Mattersburg	242	(29)
- * Club domestic league appearances and goals as of 17:12, 20 September 2013 (UTC)

Markus Schmidt (born October 12, 1977) is an Austrian former professional association football player who spent 14 years at SV Mattersburg as a midfielder.
