= Thomas Pfeilstöcker =

Austrian association football player

Personal information
- Full name: Thomas Pfeilstöcker
- Date of birth: 18 July 1978 (age 48)
- Place of birth: Bruck an der Mur, Austria
- Position: Defender

Senior career*
Years	Team	Apps	(Gls)
1995–2000	SV Oberaich		
2000–2004	Kapfenberger SV	107	(6)
2004–2005	DSV Leoben	25	(0)
2006–2007	Kapfenberger SV	39	(4)
2007	SVA Kindberg		
2007–2011	SV Grödig	104	(5)
2011	FC Bischofswiesen		
2012	FC Munderfing		
2013–2014	SV Grödig	1	(0)
- * Club domestic league appearances and goals as of 22:21, 24 December 2013 (UTC)

Thomas Pfeilstöcker (born 18 July 1978) is an Austrian footballer.

== Career ==
Pfeilstöcker was born in Bruck an der Mur and played with SV Oberaich, Kapfenberger SV, DSV Leoben, SVA Kindberg, SV Grödig, FC Bischofswiesen and FC Munderfing. He retired from playing professional football in 2011 to become groundsman at SV Grödig whilst also playing for the club's amateur team. In December 2013 due to a defensive crisis caused by the sackings of Dominique Taboga and Thomas Zündel for a betting scandal, Pfeilstöcker was included on the bench against SV Ried on 7 December 2013. He came on in the final few moments as Grödig won the match 3–0 which led to the local newspaper to proclaim that Grödig can win even with their groundsman.
