= SC Ritzing =

- Full name: SC Ritzing
- Founded: 30 November 1962; 62 years ago
- Ground: Sonnenseestadion
- Capacity: 5,000
- Chairman: Dr. Harald Reiszner
- Manager: Stefan Rapp
- League: Landesliga Burgenland
- 2015-16: 3rd
- Website: SC Ritzing

SC Ritzing is an Austrian football club that currently plays in the 4th tier Landesliga Burgenland.

== Honours ==
Austrian Regional League East

- Winner (1): 2014–15

== Current squad ==
As of 23 November 2023. Note: Flags indicate national team as defined under FIFA eligibility rules; some limited exceptions apply. Players may hold more than one non-FIFA nationality.

No.	Pos.	Nation	Player
1	GK	CRO	Ivan Kardum
2	DF	HUN	Soma Sarosi
3	DF	AUT	Devran Tiskaya
3	DF	UKR	Roman Bobak
4	DF	AUT	Marcel Etzelstorfer
5	DF	SVN	Tine Kavčič
6	MF	AUT	Adam Czifrik
7	DF	SVK	Jakub Valek
8	MF	AUT	Kevin Weingrill
10	FW	AUT	Necdet Yörük
11	MF	AUT	Marcel Cerny
12	DF	AUT	Tunc Bicer

No.	Pos.	Nation	Player
12	MF	HUN	Robin Koppermann
13	FW	AUT	Lukas-Stefan Weber
14	DF	AUT	Julian Kleibensturz
15	DF	CRO	Nemanja Gajić
16	FW	HUN	Bulcsú Szántó
17	DF	HUN	Balazs Bakondi
17	FW	AUT	David Witteveen
18	FW	ITA	Martin Gander
19	FW	CRO	Filip Filipović
20	MF	AUT	Daniel Wolf
21	MF	CZE	David Novak
22	MF	SRB	Lazar Cvetković

== Club staff ==
- Manager: Stefan Rapp
- Assistant manager: Dietmar Heger
- Business manager: Robert Hochstaffl

== See also ==
- Football in Austria
