= Michael Zechner =

Austrian footballer

Personal information
- Date of birth: 31 January 1975 (age 51)
- Place of birth: Austria
- Height: 1.75 m (5 ft 9 in)
- Position: Midfielder

Youth career
- 1983–1993: Austria Wien

Senior career*
| Years | Team | Apps | (Gls) |
| 1993–1996 | Austria Wien | 20 | (0) |
| 1993–1996 | → VfB Mödling (loan) | 10 | (2) |
| 1996 | FavAC | 9 | (2) |
| 1997 | Wiener SC | 10 | (3) |
| 1997–1998 | First Vienna | 12 | (1) |
| 1998–1999 | St. Pölten | 14 | (5) |
| 1999–2002 | Union Berlin | 67 | (7) |
| 2002 | Paderborn 07 | 5 | (1) |
| 2002–2003 | SC-ESV Parndorf | | |
| 2003–2004 | Sturm Graz | 9 | (0) |
| 2004–2005 | Kapfenberger SV | 19 | (1) |
| 2005–2007 | First Vienna | 55 | (4) |
| 2007–2010 | ASK Kottingbrunn | 82 | (14) |
| 2010–2012 | SC Herzogenburg | | |
| 2012–2013 | FC Tulln | | |
| 2013 | SC Laa/Thaya | 12 | (4) |
| 2013–2014 | FC Mistelbach | 27 | (0) |
| 2014–2015 | SV Zeiselmauer | | |
| 2015–2018 | USV Kettlasbrunn | | |

International career
| 1994 | Austria U-21 | 1 | (0) |

Managerial career
- 2010: ASK Kottingbrunn
- 2014: FC Mistelbach
- * Club domestic league appearances and goals

Michael Zechner (born 31 January 1975) is a retired Austrian footballer. Zechner played for FK Austria Wien, First Vienna FC, Wiener Sport-Club, SKN St. Pölten, Union Berlin, SC Paderborn 07, SC-ESV Parndorf 1919, Sturm Graz and Kapfenberger SV.

== Career ==
=== Coaching career ===
On 22 April 2010, while playing for ASK Kottingbrunn, Zechner was appointed manager of the club until the end of the season. He left the club at the end of the season.

In the beginning of May 2014, Zechner was appointed interim manager, alongside Siegfried Seltenhammer, for FC Mistelbach: the club he was playing for at the moment.
