= Pa Ousman Sonko =

Gambian footballer

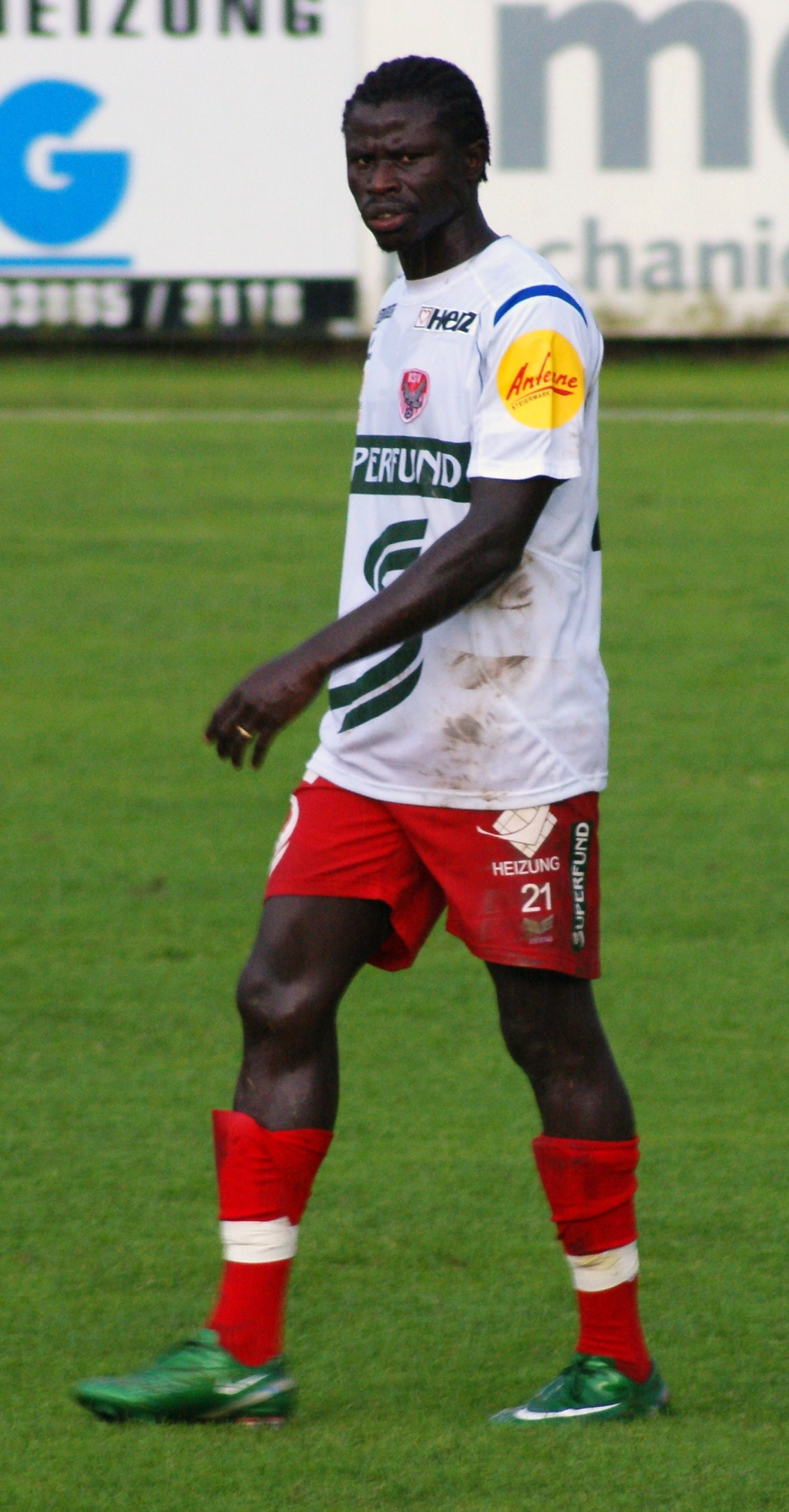
- Pa Ousman Sonko playing for Kapfenberger SV in 2009.

Personal information
- Full name: Pa Ousman Sonko
- Date of birth: December 26, 1984 (age 41)
- Place of birth: Banjul, Gambia
- Height: 1.84 m (6 ft 0 in)
- Position: Defender

Youth career
- –2000: ASK Horitschon
- 2000–2002: PSV/Schwarz-Weiß Salzburg
- 2002–2003: Austria Salzburg

Senior career*
| Years | Team | Apps | (Gls) |
| 2003–2005 | Austria Salzburg | 0 | (0) |
| 2005–2009 | Red Bull Salzburg Juniors | 68 | (5) |
| 2007 | Red Bull Salzburg | 1 | (0) |
| 2009 | SCR Altach | 7 | (0) |
| 2009 | Kapfenberg | 1 | (0) |
| 2011–2012 | SV Austria Salzburg | 27 | (2) |
| 2012–2013 | SV Seekirchen | 16 | (0) |
| Total | | 120 | (7) |

International career
| | Gambia | 2 | (0) |
- * Club domestic league appearances and goals

Pa Ousman Sonko (born 26 December 1984 in Banjul) is a retired Gambian footballer.
