= Sargon Duran =

Austrian footballer (born 1987)

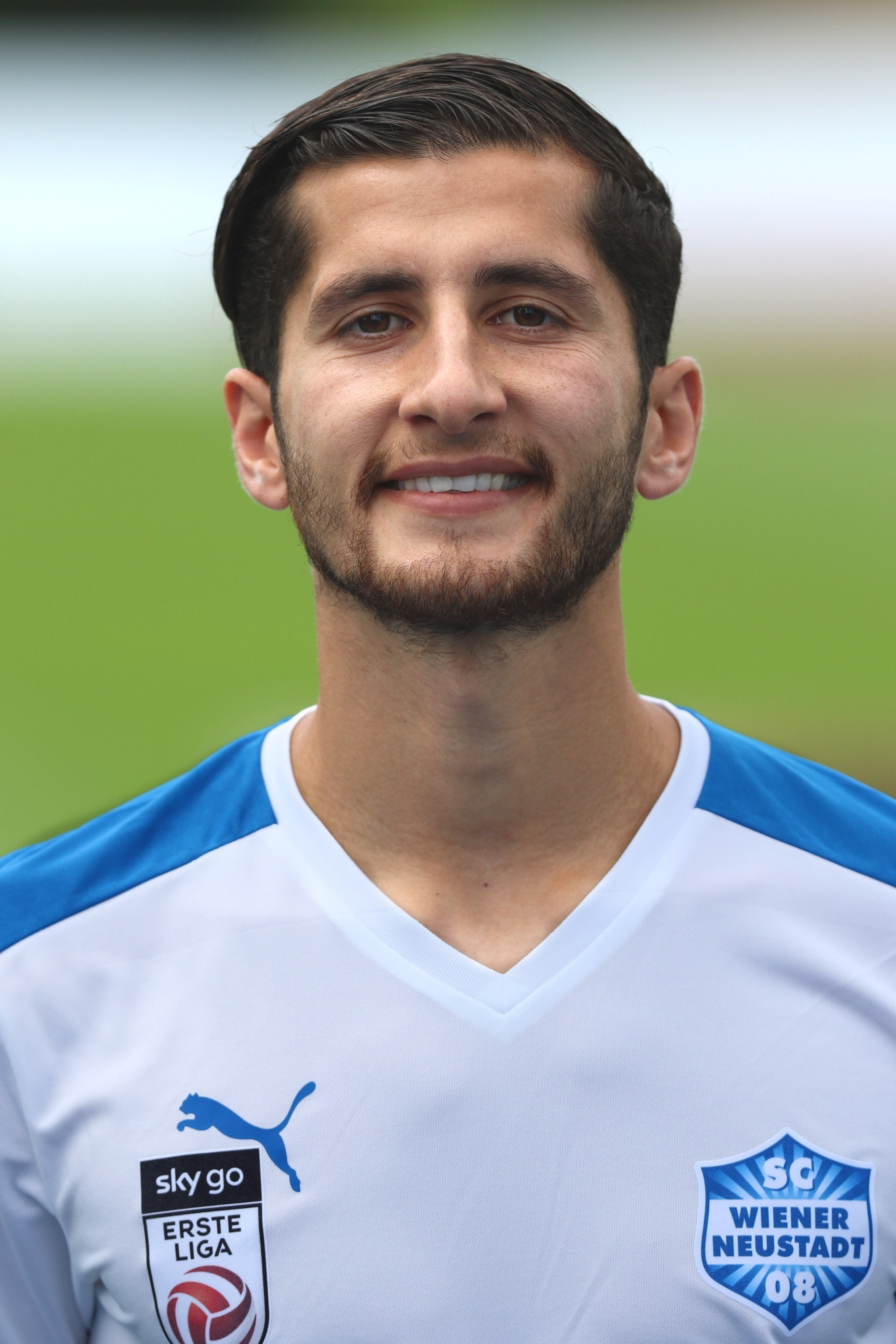
- Duran with Wiener Neustadt in 2017

Personal information
- Date of birth: 31 January 1987 (age 39)
- Place of birth: Vienna, Austria
- Height: 1.84 m (6 ft 0 in)
- Position: Centre-back

Team information
- Current team: Wiener Neustädter (Manager)

Youth career
- 1994–2003: 1. Simmeringer
- 2003–2005: First Vienna

Senior career*
Years	Team	Apps	(Gls)
2005–2007	First Vienna	42	(0)
2007–2008	Rapid Wien I	20	(1)
2008–2009	SV Horn	30	(4)
2009	Tennis Borussia Berlin	17	(2)
2010	SV Horn	15	(1)
2010–2011	First Vienna	9	(0)
2011–2013	1. SC Sollenau	41	(3)
2013–2015	FAC	57	(4)
2015–2018	Wiener Neustadt	85	(5)
2018	Mauerwerk		
2018–2019	FV Wien Floridsdorf	9	(1)

Managerial career
- 2018–2019: Wiener Neustadt (assistant)
- 2019: Wiener Neustadt (caretaker)
- 2019–2020: Austria Wien (assistant)
- 2020–2021: Austria Women (assistant)
- 2021: Admira Wacker (assistant)
- 2021: SV Sandhausen (assistant)
- 2022–: Wiener Neustädter
- * Club domestic league appearances and goals

Sargon Duran (born 31 January 1987) is an Austrian former professional footballer who played as a centre-back and current manager of Wiener Neustädter.

== Coaching career ==
In July 2018, Duran was appointed assistant manager for Gerhard Fellner at Wiener Neustadt, while still playing for FC Mauerwerk. Fellner was sacked on 2 May 2019, and Duran was then appointed as caretaker manager until the end of the season.

On 13 June 2019, Duran was appointed assistant manager for FK Austria Wien under manager newly appointed manager Christian Ilzer. The duo left the club one year later. In September 2020, Duran was appointed assistant coach for the Austria's women national team. He left the position in May 2021, to become assistant coach at Admira Wacker. In June 2021, he moved to SV Sandhausen in a similar position.

In the summer 2022, Duran was appointed manager of 1. Wiener Neustädter SC.
