= Patrick Wolf (Austrian footballer) =

Austrian footballer

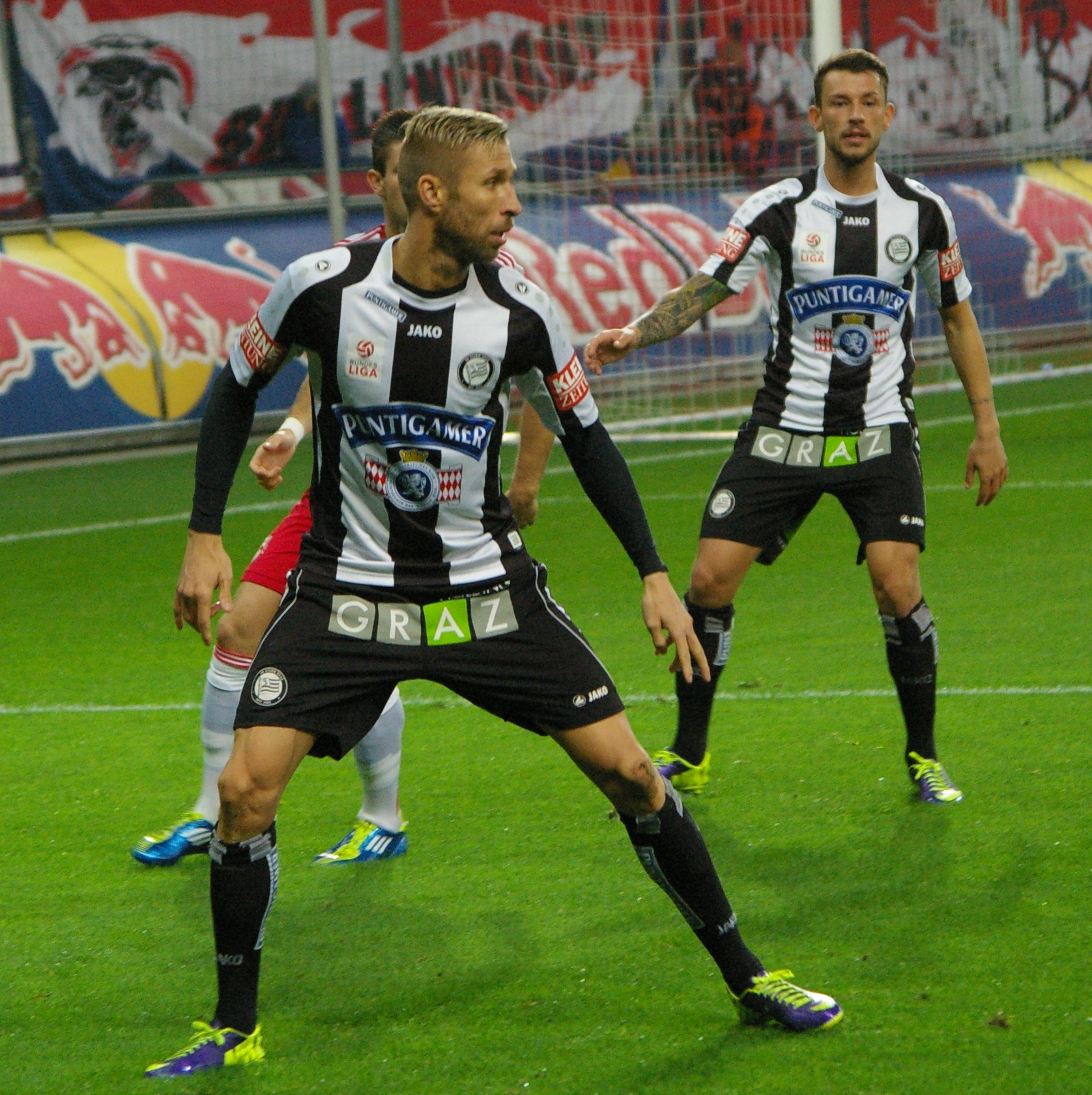

Personal information
- Full name: Patrick Wolf
- Date of birth: 4 May 1981 (age 45)
- Place of birth: Graz, Austria
- Height: 1.84 m (6 ft 0 in)
- Position: Right midfielder

Team information
- Current team: SV Frohnleiten
- Number: 33

Youth career
- Hertha Graz
- Sturm Graz
- Grazer SC
- ESK Graz

Senior career*
Years	Team	Apps	(Gls)
2004–2005	FC Gratkorn	31	(5)
2005–2006	SV Ried	21	(1)
2007	FC Kärnten	12	(0)
2007–2008	Austria Kärnten	47	(5)
2008–2011	Wiener Neustadt	63	(7)
2011–2014	Sturm Graz	64	(7)
2012–2013	→ Kapfenberger SV (loan)	27	(4)
2014–2016	SV Allerheiligen	38	(6)
2016–2018	Bad Radkersburg		
2018	SV Tobelbad	12	(4)
2018–	SV Frohnleiten	73	(27)

International career
2010	Austria	2	(0)
- * Club domestic league appearances and goals as of 18:24, 12 October 2023 (UTC)

Patrick Wolf (born 4 May 1981, in Graz) is an Austrian footballer playing for SV Frohnleiten.

== Club career ==
In 2014, Wolf ended his professional football career and moved to third tier Regionalliga Mitte side SV Allerheiligen.

== International career ==
Wolf made his first appearance for the Austria national football team in a friendly against Denmark on 3 March 2010. Austria won the match 2–1.
