= Erwin Keil =

Austrian footballer

Personal information
- Date of birth: 30 November 1980 (age 45)
- Place of birth: Austria
- Height: 1.78 m (5 ft 10 in)
- Position: Striker

Team information
- Current team: SV Kuchl
- Number: 10

Senior career*
Years	Team	Apps	(Gls)
1999–2002	SV Austria Salzburg	1	(0)
2002	FC Puch		
2002–2004	SV Austria Salzburg	8	(2)
2004–2008	FC Red Bull Salzburg (Amatuere)	56	(28)
2008–2009	SV Grödig	31	(2)
2009–2011	TSV St. Johann	60	(12)
2011–2014	FC Pinzgau Saalfelden	86	(16)
2014–	SV Kuchl	44	(13)
- * Club domestic league appearances and goals as of 22 March 2016

Erwin Keil (born 30 November 1980) is a football striker from Austria currently playing for SV Kuchl.

== Career ==
He has previously played for SV Austria Salzburg, FC Puch, SV Grödig, TSV St. Johann and FC Pinzgau Saalfelden.
