= Vedran Jerković =

Croatian footballer

Personal information
- Date of birth: 13 October 1991 (age 35)
- Place of birth: Bugojno, Bosnia and Herzegovina
- Height: 1.91 m (6 ft 3 in)
- Positions: Centre-back; midfielder

Team information
- Current team: FSV Rot-Weiß Wolfhagen
- Number: 4

Youth career
- 2002–2008: Croatia Sesvete

Senior career*
Years	Team	Apps	(Gls)
2008–2009	Croatia Sesvete	21	(1)
2011–2013	Istra 1961	25	(0)
2013	NK Zagreb	2	(1)
2014	HNK Gorica	30	(7)
2015–2017	Borussia Fulda	66	(6)
2018–2024	1. FC Schwalmstadt	98	(45)
2024–	FSV Rot-Weiß Wolfhagen	1	(0)
- * Club domestic league appearances and goals as of 27 July 2024

Vedran Jerković (born 13 October 1991) is a Croatian footballer who plays for German Hessenliga club FSV Rot-Weiß Wolfhagen.
