= Abu Kanneh =

Liberian footballer

Personal information
- Full name: Abu Kanneh
- Date of birth: 9 November 1983 (age 42)
- Place of birth: Liberia
- Height: 1.77 m (5 ft 10 in)
- Position: Striker

Team information
- Current team: DSV Leoben

Senior career*
Years	Team	Apps	(Gls)
2002–2007	FC Gratkorn	99	(19)
2007–	DSV Leoben		

International career
- Liberia
- * Club domestic league appearances and goals as of 13:42, 10 December 2007 (UTC)

Abu Kanneh (born 9 November 1983) is a Liberian footballer who plays as a striker for DSV Leoben. He previously played for FC Gratkorn. He is also a member of the Liberia national football team.
