= Kozelsky (rural locality) =

Kozelsky (Russian: Козельский; masculine), Kozelskaya (Козельская; feminine), or Kozelskoye (Козельское; neuter) is the name of several rural localities in Russia:

- Kozelskoye, Kaluga Oblast, a village in Borovsky District of Kaluga Oblast
- Kozelskoye, Ryazan Oblast, a village in Aristovsky Rural Okrug of Klepikovsky District of Ryazan Oblast
