= Georg Harding =

Austrian footballer and coach

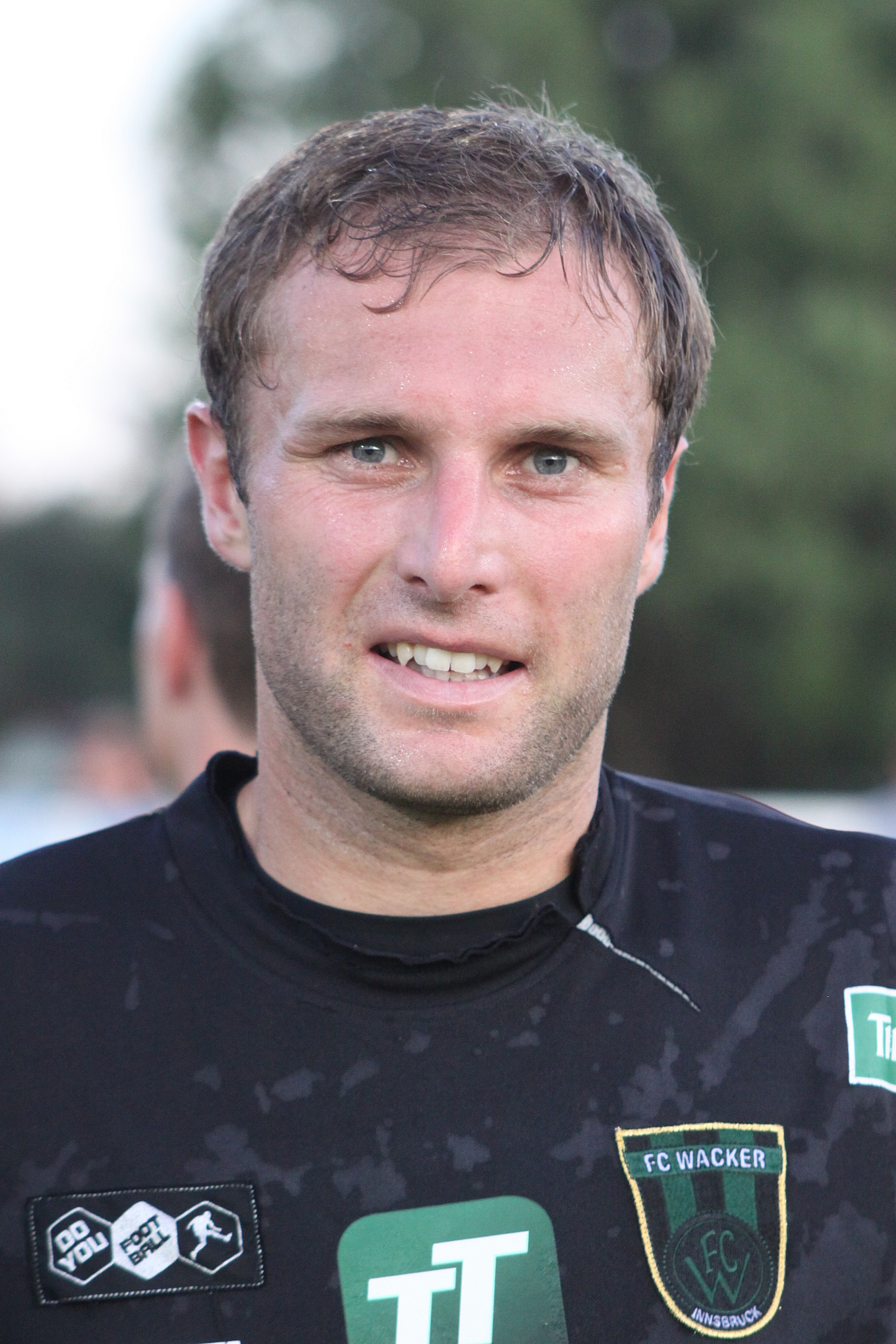

Personal information
- Date of birth: 30 August 1981 (age 45)
- Place of birth: Steyr, Austria
- Height: 1.83 m (6 ft 0 in)
- Position: Midfielder

Youth career
- –1995: TSV Eiche Neumarkt
- 1995–1998: FC Kärnten

Senior career*
Years	Team	Apps	(Gls)
2000–2001	FC Kärnten	4	(0)
2001–2003	SK Treibach		
2003–2007	DSV Leoben	115	(4)
2007–2009	SK Rapid Wien	18	(0)
2009–2012	Wacker Innsbruck	74	(1)
2012–2013	LASK Linz	21	(0)
2013–2015	SK Treibach	44	(6)

Managerial career
- 2012–2013: LASK Linz (youth)
- 2013–2017: SK Treibach (youth)
- 2015–2016: SK Treibach (assistant)
- 2016–2017: SK Treibach
- * Club domestic league appearances and goals

Georg Harding (born 30 August 1981) is an Austrian football coach and a former player.

== Career ==
Harding began his Career with TSV Neumarkt, here played with the team between 1995. Now joined to the Academy from FC Kärnten than in the year 1998 was promoted from Head Coach August Starek and played his first games in the Erste Liga. In the season 2001/2002 joined to lower League club SK Treibach, here played two season and moved than in 2003 to Red Zac Erste Liga DSV Leoben. He played with DSV Leoben 115 games and scores 4 games, before transferred to SK Rapid Wien in 2007. In January 2009 was on trial at SV Wehen Wiesbaden of the German 2. Bundesliga, the transfer failed and he turned back to SK Rapid Wien.
