= Sportzentrum Fischl =

Football stadium in Klagenfurt, Austria

Coordinates: 46°37′14.6″N 14°20′20.5″E

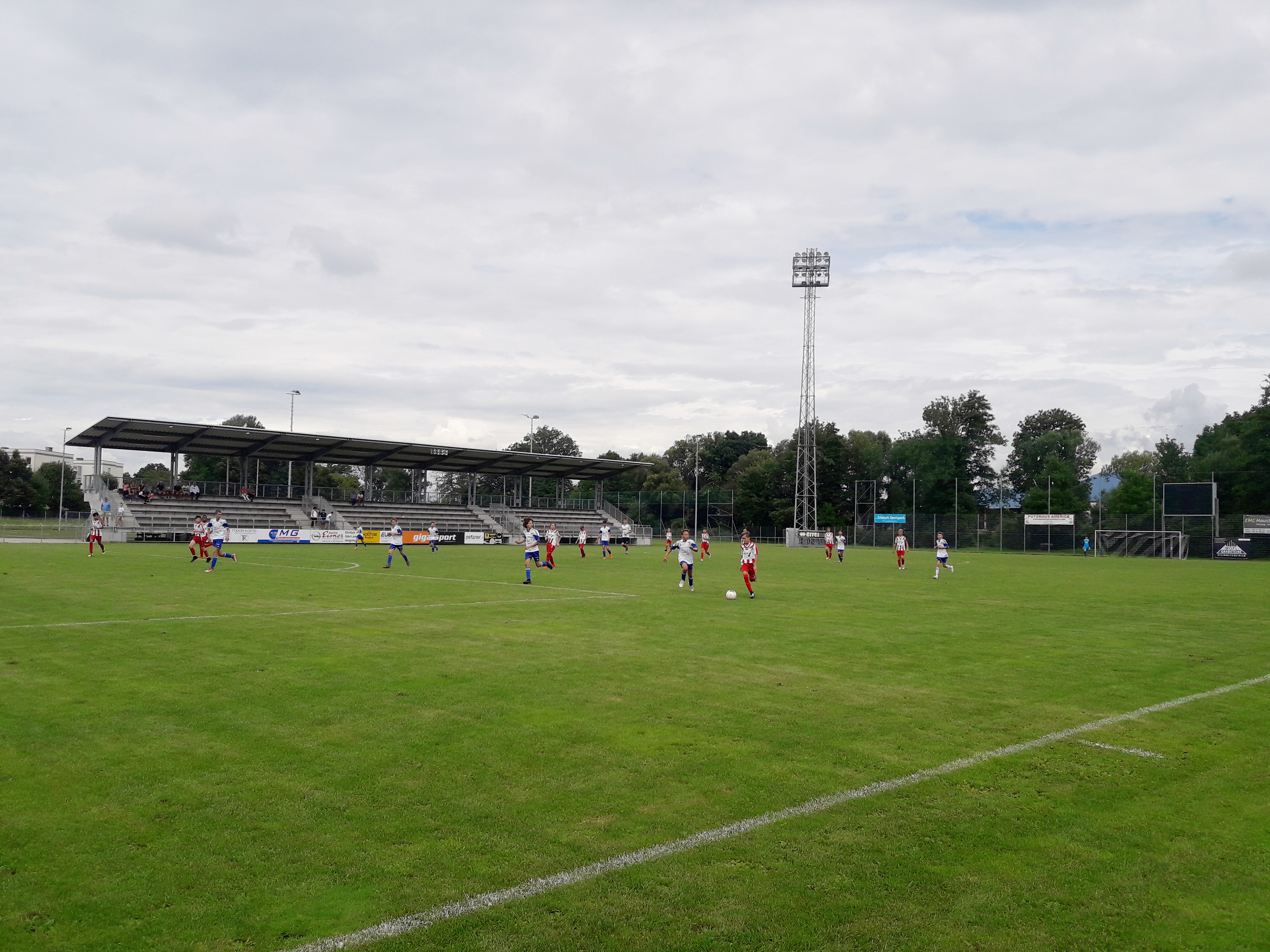
Soccer pitch at the Sportzentrum Fischl

The Sportzentrum Fischl was a soccer stadium in Klagenfurt; it had a capacity of 3,000 people. It was dismantled after its home team FC Kärnten disbanded in 2009.
