= Patrick Scherrer =

Austrian footballer

Personal information
- Date of birth: 20 December 1986 (age 39)
- Place of birth: Feldkirch, Austria
- Height: 1.86 m (6 ft 1 in)
- Position: Midfielder

Team information
- Current team: FC Hard
- Number: 28

Senior career*
| Years | Team | Apps | (Gls) |
| 2005–2008 | SC Austria Lustenau | 68 | (4) |
| 2008–2010 | SK Sturm Graz | 16 | (1) |
| 2008–2010 | SK Sturm Graz II | 7 | (3) |
| 2009–2010 | → SC Rheindorf Altach (loan) | 32 | (6) |
| 2010–2013 | SC Rheindorf Altach | 63 | (7) |
| 2013–2016 | USV Eschen/Mauren | 32 | (12) |
| 2016– | FC Hard | 36 | (2) |
- * Club domestic league appearances and goals as of 25 July 2016

Patrick Scherrer (born 20 December 1986) is an Austrian football midfielder currently playing for FC Hard.

He previously played for SC Austria Lustenau, SK Sturm Graz and SC Rheindorf Altach.
