= Wolfgang Eder =

Austrian businessman (born 1952)

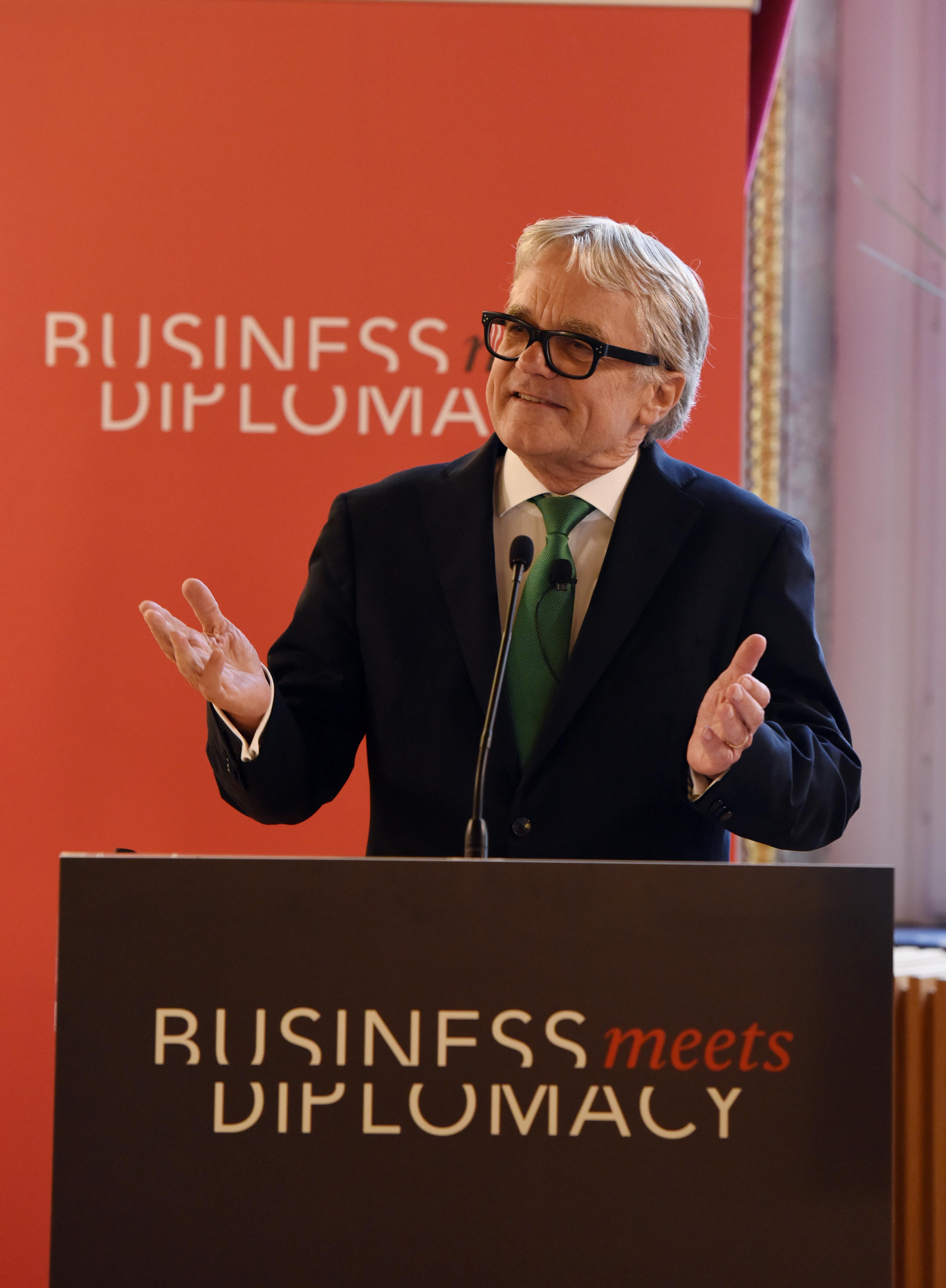
Image of Wolfgang Eder in 2016

Wolfgang Eder (born 1952) is an Austrian businessman who has been serving as chairman and chief executive officer of Voestalpine AG since 2014.

== Career ==
Eder joined Voestalpine's management board in 1995, and helped oversee its privatisation, which started the same year.

Eder currently chairs the World Steel Association and was president of the European Steel Association (EUROFER) from 2009 till May 2014.

In late 2018, Voestalpine steel company announced Eder would step down in July 2019 and be replaced by Herbert Eibensteiner.

== Other activities ==
=== Corporate boards ===
- Infineon Technologies, Member of the Supervisory Board (since 2018)
- Oberbank, Member of the Supervisory Board (since 2006)

=== Non-profit organizations ===
- European Round Table of Industrialists (ERT), Member
