= Arno Kozelsky =

Austrian footballer

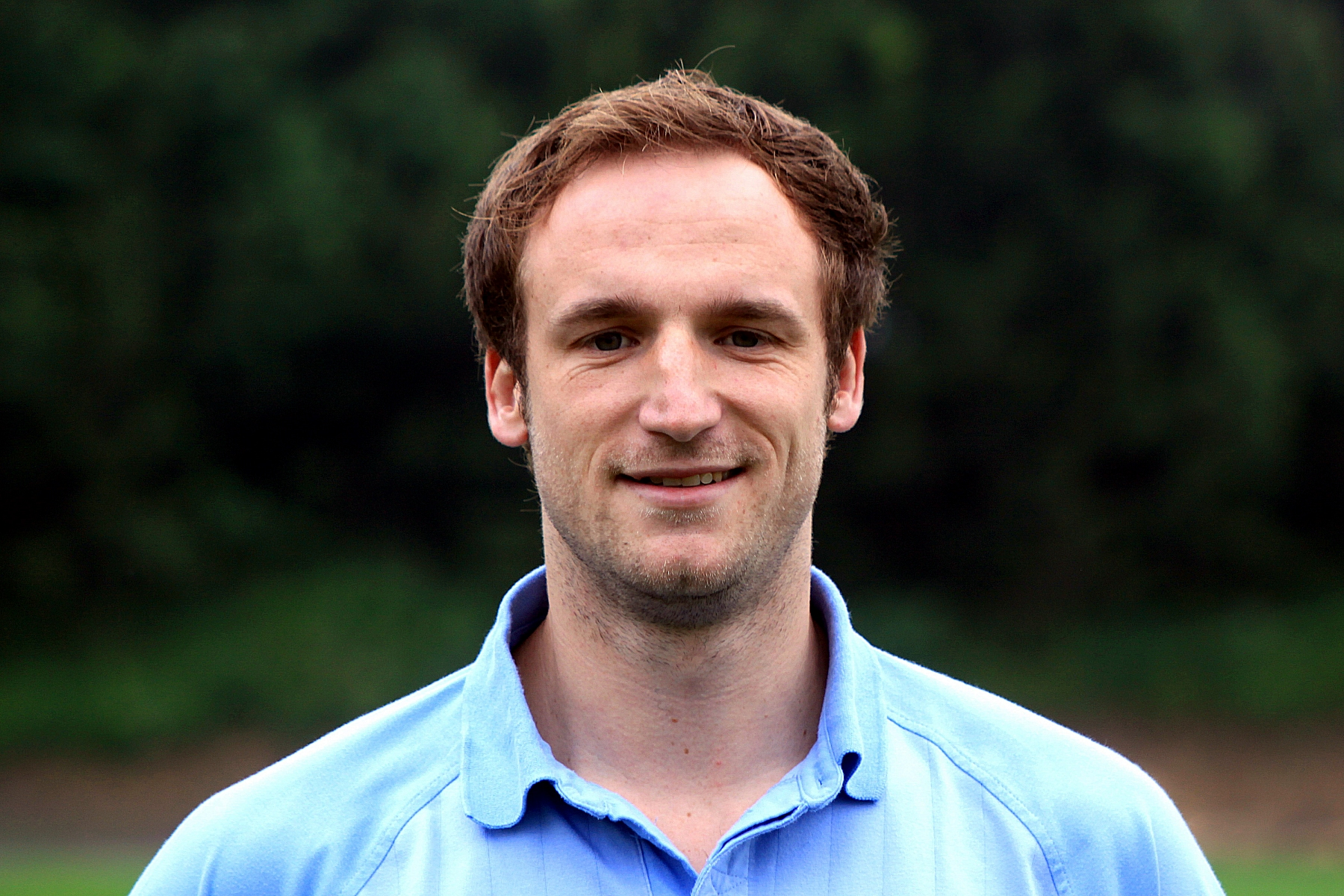

Personal information
- Full name: Arno Paul Kozelsky
- Date of birth: 1 November 1981 (age 44)
- Place of birth: Liebenfels, Austria
- Height: 1.85 m (6 ft 1 in)
- Position: Striker

Team information
- Current team: St. Pölten
- Number: 11

Senior career*
Years	Team	Apps	(Gls)
2001–2002	SVG Bleiburg		
2002–2004	Kärnten	8	(1)
2003–2004	→ Leoben (loan)	29	(5)
2004–2008	Leoben	94	(43)
2008–2011	Kapfenberg	31	(2)
2011–	St. Pölten		
- * Club domestic league appearances and goals as of 13:12, 11 August 2009 (UTC)

Arno Paul Kozelsky (born 1 November 1981) is an Austrian footballer, currently playing for SKN St. Pölten.

== Club career ==
Kozelsky played for lower league sides Liebenfels and Bleiburg before joining Austrian Football Bundesliga outfit FC Kärnten for the second half of the 2002–2003 season. In 2004, he signed for DSV Leoben. He impressed in a trial with Hibernian in May 2007, and joined Hibernian at their pre-season training camp to try to get a contract with the club. After an unsuccessful bid at training camp with Hibernian, he was immediately resigned by Austrian club DSV Leoben in 2007. In summer 2008 he moved to promoted Kapfenberg.
