= SC Schwanenstadt =

- Full name: Sportclub Schwanenstadt
- Founded: 1946
- Dissolved: 2008
- Ground: bet-at-home.com-Arena (Stadion Vor der Au)
- Capacity: 5,600
- League: Erste Liga
- 2007–08: 7th
Home colours	Away colours

SC Schwanenstadt was an Austrian football club from Schwanenstadt, Upper Austria.

The club was founded on 16 March 1946, it achieved promotion to the Landeliga (IV) in 2000 and to the Regionalliga Mitte one year later, where in 2005 they won the championship and continued their way up to First League. They finished the 2007–08 season in 7th place, whereafter they were disbanded and their playing licence was taken over by newly formed FC Magna Wiener Neustadt, who also took over the majority of the playing squad.

== Notable players ==
- Thierry Fidjeu (2006)
- Matthias Dollinger (2008)
- Matt Luzunaris (2008)
- Sascha Pichler (2008)
- Krzysztof Ratajczyk (2008)

== Manager history ==
- (Poland) Andrzej Lesiak (2004–2005)
- Andreas Heraf (2005, 2006–2007)
