= FC Lustenau 07 =

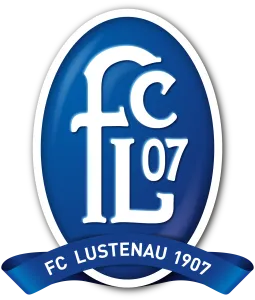
- Full name: Fussball Club Lustenau 07
- Founded: 20 September 1907; 118 years ago
- Ground: Stadion an der Holzstraße; Lustenau
- Capacity: 2,000
- President: Dr. Omer Rehman
- Manager: Philipp Hagspiel
- League: Austrian Regionalliga West
- 2025–26: Austrian Regionalliga West, 12th of 17
Home colours	Away colours

FC Lustenau 07 is a football club based in Lustenau, Vorarlberg. They currently compete in the Austrian Regionalliga, the third tier of Austrian football. Until the 2012–13 they played in the Second League.

Although the club has never had much domestic success, it played a pivotal role in the development of European club football prior to UEFA-sanctioned competitions.

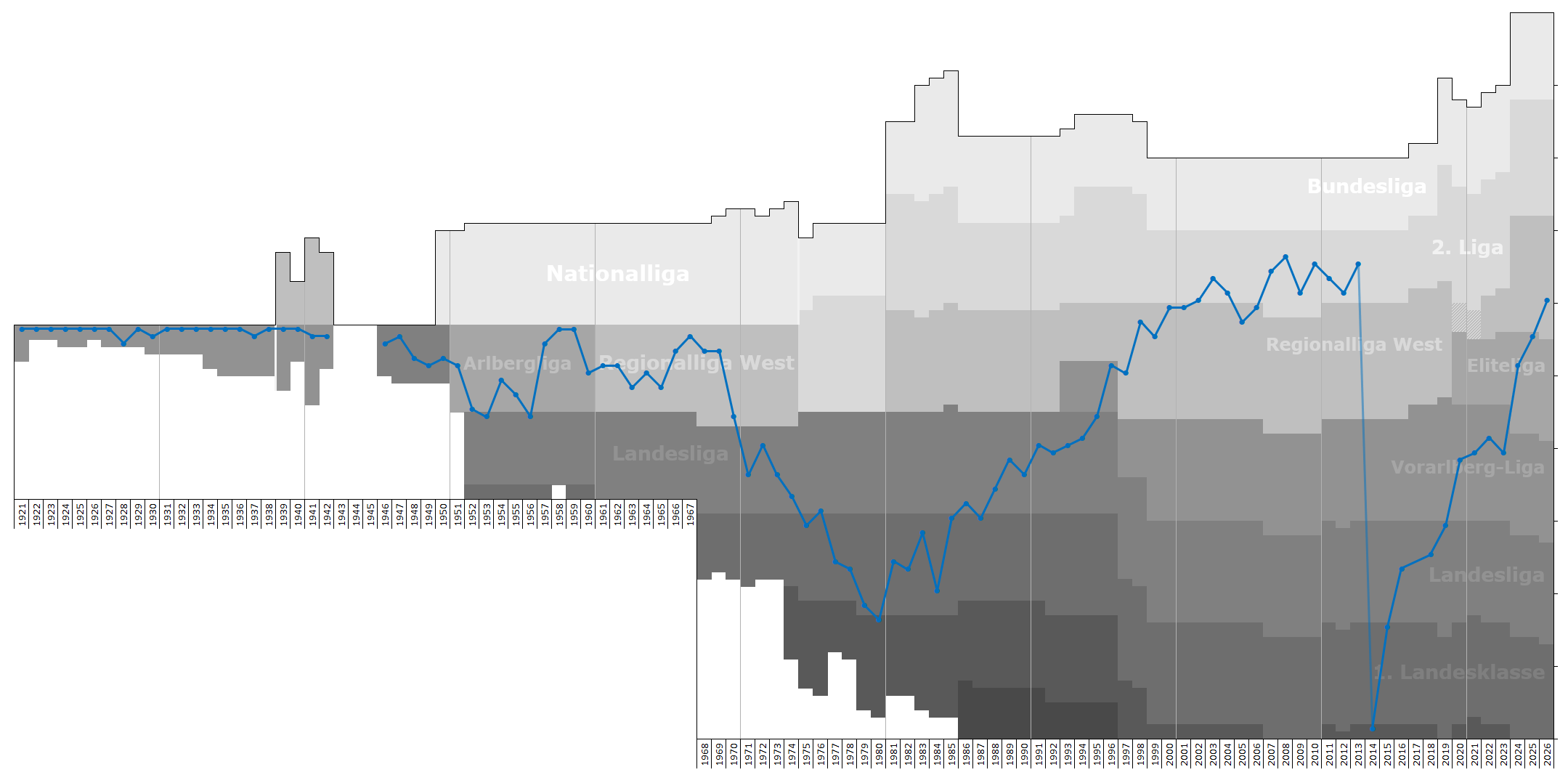
Historical chart of league performance

== Honours ==
- Bodensee-Fußballvereinigung
  - Champions (7): 1910, 1911, 1913, 1926, 1927, 1932, 1933
- Austrian Landesliga
  - Champions (1): 2024–25
