= Austrian Regionalliga Central =

Former third-tier football league division in Austria

- Founded: 1959, re-established 1994
- Folded: 2026
- Replaced by: Regionalliga North; Regionalliga South
- Country: Austria
- Confederation: UEFA
- Number of clubs: 16 (final season)
- Level on pyramid: Level 2 (1959–1974); Level 3 (1994–2026)
- Promotion to: Staatsliga (1959–1965); Nationalliga (1965–1974); 2. Liga (1994–2026)
- Relegation to: Landesliga
- Domestic cup: Austrian Cup
- Last champions: ASK Voitsberg (2025–26)
- Most championships: TSV Hartberg (5 titles)
- Top scorer: Michael Tieber (128)

The Austrian Regionalliga Central (German: Regionalliga Mitte), was a men's football league in Austria. It covered the states of Carinthia, Styria and Upper Austria, together with the East Tyrol exclave, whose clubs were registered with the Carinthian association. The league was staged in two separate spells. From 1959 to 1974 it formed part of the second tier of the Austrian football league system. It returned in 1994 as a third tier division and was contested for a further 32 seasons before it was dissolved in 2026.

In its second spell the league sat below the 2. Liga and above the state leagues of Carinthia, Styria and Upper Austria. It was one of three parallel divisions at the third level, alongside the Regionalliga East and the Regionalliga West.

The Austrian Football Association dissolved the league at the end of the 2025–26 season as part of a wider reform that took the third tier from three divisions to four. Clubs from Upper Austria joined clubs from Salzburg in a new Regionalliga North. Clubs from Styria and Carinthia formed a new Regionalliga South. ASK Voitsberg were the last champions and TSV Hartberg were the most successful club with five titles.

== History ==
=== Second tier (1959–1974) ===
The Regionalliga Central was introduced for the 1959–60 season together with the Austrian Regionalliga East. A third division, the Austrian Regionalliga West, followed a year later. The three leagues replaced the Staatsliga B and the regional Tauernliga and Arlbergliga as the second level of Austrian football. Eleven clubs from Carinthia, Styria and Upper Austria contested the first season, which was won by SV Stickstoff Linz. The champions of each Regionalliga were promoted directly to the top flight.

The league ran on this basis for fifteen seasons. A reorganisation of the national game in 1974 created a ten-club Bundesliga and a ten-club second Bundesliga, and the Regionalliga Central and Regionalliga West were both abolished.

=== Absence (1974–1994) ===
For the next twenty years there was no Regionalliga in the region. The state leagues of Carinthia, Upper Austria and Styria formed the highest level below the national divisions, and their champions met in play-offs for a place in the second tier. The Regionalliga East continued in most of this period, and the Regionalliga West was reinstated in 1980–81.

=== Third tier (1994–2026) ===
The Regionalliga Central was re-established for the 1994–95 season, this time as the third level of the pyramid. SAK Klagenfurt took the first title of the new era.

Promotion arrangements changed repeatedly. For much of the period the champions of the three Regionalligen either went up directly or contested play-offs with each other and with the lower placed clubs of the second tier, depending on how many teams that division held. Promotion also depended on a club obtaining a licence from the Bundesliga, and in several seasons the runners-up went up because the champions had not applied or had been refused. The 2025–26 season was the last in which a Regionalliga champion was promoted directly.

No champions were declared in 2019–20 or 2020–21. Both seasons were abandoned because of the COVID-19 pandemic.

Travel was a persistent complaint. Clubs in south east Styria faced round trips of some 330 kilometres to opponents in Upper Austria, and the cost of those journeys became one of the main arguments for breaking the league up.

=== Reform, dissolution and final season ===
The Austrian Football Association (ÖFB) presidium ordered a review of the third level in May 2024. A working group led by Günter Kreissl and sporting director Peter Schöttel examined several models and consulted clubs from across the country. The Carinthian and Styrian associations presented the agreed format with the ÖFB on 19 May 2025, and the presidium confirmed the wider structure the following month.

From the 2026–27 season, the third level consists of four divisions. The Regionalliga East is unchanged and covers Vienna, Lower Austria and Burgenland. The Regionalliga North covers Upper Austria and Salzburg, the Regionalliga South covers Styria and Carinthia, and the Regionalliga West covers Tyrol and Vorarlberg. Direct promotion was abolished at the same time. The four Regionalliga champions now play off over two legs for two places in the 2. Liga, with the pairings drawn each year.

The successor in the south uses a split format. Eight clubs from Carinthia and eight from Styria play a double round within their own state in the autumn. The top four from each group then contest a championship play-off in the spring to decide the Regionalliga South title, and the bottom four of each group play a qualification play-off against relegation.

Sixteen clubs contested the 2025–26 season. ASK Voitsberg secured promotion on 25 April 2026 with a 7–0 win over SC Weiz, and clinched the title five rounds from the end with a 3–1 win at Deutschlandsberger SC on the twenty-fifth matchday. They finished with 80 points and 113 goals, returning to the 2. Liga after one season away. The final round of the Regionalliga Mitte was played on 3 and 5 June 2026.

== Champions ==
=== Second tier champions (1959–1974) ===
The Regionalliga Central was one of the regional divisions that made up the second tier of Austrian football until 1974. The champions were promoted directly to the top flight.

Regionalliga Central champions 1959–60 to 1973–74
Club	Titles	Winning seasons
Kapfenberger SV	3	1960–61, 1962–63, 1973–74
Austria Klagenfurt	3	1961–62, 1964–65, 1971–72
WSG Radenthein	3	1966–67, 1969–70, 1972–73
Sturm Graz	2	1963–64, 1965–66
WSV Donawitz	2	1967–68, 1970–71
SV Stickstoff Linz	1	1959–60
VÖEST Linz	1	1968–69

=== Third tier champions (1994–2026 ===
The league was not staged between 1974 and 1994. In those years the champions of the Carinthian, Upper Austrian and Styrian state leagues met in a promotion play-off that carried the Regionalliga Mitte name in some seasons. No champions were declared in 2019–20 or 2020–21, as both seasons were abandoned because of the COVID-19 pandemic.

Regionalliga Central champions 1994–95 to 2025–26
Club	Titles	Winning seasons
TSV Hartberg	5	1995–96, 1998–99, 2005–06, 2008–09, 2016–17
FC Blau-Weiß Linz	2	2002–03, 2015–16
Grazer AK	2	2011–12, 2018–19
LASK Linz	2	2012–13, 2013–14
ASK Voitsberg	2	2023–24, 2025–26
SAK Klagenfurt	1	1994–95
SK Eintracht Wels	1	1996–97
FC Kärnten (Note: Competing as FC Austria/VSV Kärnten.)	1	1997–98
BSV Bad Bleiberg	1	1999–2000
ASKÖ Pasching	1	2000–01
Kapfenberger SV	1	2001–02
FC Gratkorn	1	2003–04
SC Schwanenstadt	1	2004–05
SV Bad Aussee	1	2006–07
1. FC Vöcklabruck	1	2007–08
WAC/St. Andrä (Note: Awarded the title after FC Pasching were deducted thirteen points at the end of the season.)	1	2009–10
LASK Linz II (Note: The reserve side of LASK Linz, listed separately from the first team.)	1	2010–11
Austria Klagenfurt (Note: A different club from the SK Austria Klagenfurt that won the title three times in the 1960s and 1970s.)	1	2014–15
SV Lafnitz	1	2017–18
Sturm Graz II	1	2021–22
DSV Leoben	1	2022–23
Hertha Wels	1	2024–25

== Records ==
TSV Hartberg won five titles, more than any other club. Michael Tieber was the league's leading scorer of all time with 128 goals in 261 matches for Grazer AK, Kapfenberger SV, SC Weiz, Kalsdorf, St. Anna am Aigen and SV Lafnitz. In the final season Fabian Schubert scored 43 goals in 29 matches for ASK Voitsberg.

== See also ==
- Austrian Regionalliga
- Austrian football league system
