= 2015–16 Austrian Regionalliga =

Austrian Regional League
- Season: 2015–16
- Champions: SV Horn (Ost); FC Blau-Weiß Linz (Mitte); WSG Wattens (West)
- Promoted: SV Horn; FC Blau-Weiß Linz; WSG Wattens
- Relegated: 1. SC Sollenau; SV Oberwart; Wolfsberger AC II; SV Wallern; Annabichler SV; TSV Neumarkt; SC Bregenz; FC Kitzbühel; SVG Reichenau
- Matches: 720
- Goals: 2,308 (3.21 per match)

The 2015–16 season of the Regionalliga was the 57th season of the third-tier football league in Austria, since its establishment in 1959.

== Regionalliga Ost ==
Pos	Team	Pld	W	D	L	GF	GA	GD	Pts	Promotion, qualification or relegation
1	SV Horn (C, P)	30	21	6	3	80	28	+52	69	Promotion to Austrian First League
2	First Vienna FC	30	20	7	3	63	21	+42	67	
3	SC Ritzing	30	14	10	6	58	30	+28	52	
4	SKU Amstetten	30	14	10	6	51	30	+21	52	
5	ASK Ebreichsdorf	30	12	8	10	37	33	+4	44	
6	FC Stadlau	30	11	10	9	42	40	+2	43	
7	SC-ESV Parndorf 1919	30	11	9	10	58	46	+12	42	
8	FK Austria Wien II	30	10	9	11	45	39	+6	39	
9	SKN St. Pölten II	30	11	6	13	32	41	−9	39	
10	FC Admira Wacker Mödling II	30	9	9	12	47	55	−8	36	
11	1. SC Sollenau	30	8	8	14	35	57	−22	32	Withdrawal to 1. Klasse (Note: 1. SC Sollenau voluntarily withdrew to 1. Klasse and ceded its Regionalliga licence to FCM Traiskirchen, which will play as SG Traiskirchen/Sollenau next season.)
12	SK Rapid Wien II	30	7	10	13	38	57	−19	31	
13	SC Neusiedl am See 1919	30	6	11	13	44	60	−16	29	
14	Wiener Sportklub	30	7	8	15	37	54	−17	29	
15	SV Schwechat (Note: SV Schwechat was reprieved to fill a vacancy when Burgenland champions SV Eberau declined promotion and runners-up SV Mattersburg II were ineligible.)	30	7	5	18	33	64	−31	26	
16	SV Oberwart (R)	30	5	8	17	29	72	−43	23	Relegation to Austrian Landesliga

Updated to match(es) played on 1 June 2016. Source:
Rules for classification: 1) Points; 2) Goal difference; 3) Goals scored
(C) Champions; (P) Promoted; (R) Relegated

== Regionalliga Mitte ==
Pos	Team	Pld	W	D	L	GF	GA	GD	Pts	Promotion or relegation
1	FC Blau-Weiß Linz (C, P)	30	22	4	4	89	25	+64	70	Promotion to Austrian First League
2	TSV Hartberg	30	18	6	6	64	38	+26	60	
3	Union St. Florian	30	15	7	8	53	35	+18	52	
4	SC Kalsdorf	30	16	3	11	56	43	+13	51	
5	FC Pasching/LASK Linz II	30	15	5	10	59	45	+14	50	
6	SV Lafnitz	30	15	4	11	55	43	+12	49	
7	ATSV Stadl-Paura	30	14	6	10	58	49	+9	48	
8	USV Allerheiligen	30	14	6	10	50	43	+7	48	
9	Deutschlandsberger SC	30	12	7	11	49	43	+6	43	
10	Union Gurten	30	11	7	12	51	44	+7	40	
11	SK Sturm Graz II	30	9	11	10	48	48	0	38	
12	SK Vorwärts Steyr	30	9	7	14	36	49	−13	34	
13	SC Weiz	30	6	8	16	33	66	−33	26	
14	Wolfsberger AC II (R)	30	6	5	19	34	64	−30	23	Relegation to Austrian Landesliga
15	SV Wallern (R)	30	6	4	20	35	70	−35	22	Relegation to Austrian Landesliga
16	Annabichler SV (R)	30	5	4	21	24	86	−62	19	Relegation to Austrian Landesliga

Updated to match(es) played on 1 June 2016. Source:
Rules for classification: 1) Points; 2) Goal difference; 3) Goals scored
(C) Champions; (P) Promoted; (R) Relegated

== Regionalliga West ==
Pos	Team	Pld	W	D	L	GF	GA	GD	Pts	Promotion or relegation
1	WSG Wattens (C, P)	30	24	3	3	81	18	+63	75	Promotion to Austrian First League
2	USK Anif	30	18	3	9	76	46	+30	57	
3	TSV St. Johann	30	16	7	7	39	25	+14	55	
4	FC Dornbirn 1913	30	15	5	10	58	39	+19	50	
5	SC Schwaz	30	12	10	8	44	40	+4	46	
6	USC Eugendorf	30	12	7	11	56	63	−7	43	
7	FC Wacker Innsbruck II	30	12	6	12	54	46	+8	42	
8	FC Pinzgau Saalfelden	30	11	6	13	51	59	−8	39	
9	SV Seekirchen 1945	30	10	9	11	50	58	−8	39	
10	SCR Altach II	30	11	5	14	33	48	−15	38	
11	FC Kufstein	30	10	7	13	43	45	−2	37	
12	FC Hard	30	9	9	12	35	42	−7	36	
13	TSV Neumarkt (R)	30	11	3	16	42	61	−19	36	Relegation to Austrian Landesliga
14	SC Bregenz (R)	30	9	6	15	42	63	−21	33	Relegation to Austrian Landesliga
15	FC Kitzbühel (R)	30	9	5	16	53	58	−5	32	Relegation to Austrian Landesliga
16	SVG Reichenau (R)	30	2	7	21	28	88	−60	13	Relegation to Austrian Landesliga

Updated to match(es) played on 1 June 2016. Source:
Rules for classification: 1) Points; 2) Goal difference; 3) Goals scored
(C) Champions; (P) Promoted; (R) Relegated

== No promotion play-offs ==
Due to vacancies in the Austrian Football First League and SV Grödig's resignation from professionalism, the two-legged promotion play-offs were cancelled. Instead, WSG Wattens, champion of the Regionalliga West, and FC Blau-Weiß Linz, champion of the Regionalliga Mitte were promoted to fill those vacancies.

== Top scorers ==
As of 1 June 2016.

Rank	Scorer	Club	Goals
1	(Austria) Simon Zangerl	WSG Wattens	32
2	(Nigeria) Yusuf Otubanjo	FC Blau-Weiß Linz	28
3	(Austria) Andreas Fischer	SC Kalsdorf	25
3	(Austria) Marco Hesina	FC Wacker Innsbruck II	25
5	(Austria) Dario Tadić	TSV Hartberg	24
6	(Serbia) Milan Vuković	SKU Amstetten	22
7	(Serbia) Radovan Vujanović	SV Horn	19
7	(Austria) Michael Tieber	SV Lafnitz	19
9	(Austria) Christian Dengg	Deutschlandsberger SC	17
9	(Austria) Rexhe Bytyci	Union St. Florian	17
