= 2014–15 Austrian Regionalliga =

Austrian Regional League
- Season: 2014–15
- Champions: SV Austria Salzburg (West); SK Austria Klagenfurt (Mitte); SC Ritzing (Ost)
- Promoted: SV Austria Salzburg; SK Austria Klagenfurt
- Relegated: SV Stegersbach; SR Donaufeld Wien; SV Neuberg; Union Vöcklamarkt; ATSV Wolfsberg; FC Bizau; FC Höchst
- Matches: 722
- Goals: 2,231 (3.09 per match)

The 2014–15 season of the Regionalliga was the 56th season of the third-tier football league in Austria, since its establishment in 1959.

== Regionalliga Ost ==
Pos	Team	Pld	W	D	L	GF	GA	GD	Pts	Qualification or relegation
1	SC Ritzing (Note: Due to failure to get a Bundesliga license, SC Ritzing did not qualify for the play-offs match. Their place was replaced by SC-ESV Parndorf 1919.) (C)	30	17	10	3	60	34	+26	61	
2	SC-ESV Parndorf 1919	30	17	4	9	64	36	+28	55	Qualification to Promotion play-offs
3	SKU Amstetten	30	12	12	6	60	38	+22	48	
4	First Vienna FC	30	12	12	6	46	32	+14	48	
5	SC Neusiedl am See 1919	30	13	6	11	43	46	−3	45	
6	SV Schwechat	30	12	8	10	44	32	+12	44	
7	FC Admira Wacker Mödling II	30	10	12	8	48	44	+4	42	
8	1. SC Sollenau	30	11	9	10	50	49	+1	42	
9	SK Rapid Wien II	30	10	9	11	50	42	+8	39	
10	FK Austria Wien II	30	10	9	11	52	46	+6	39	
11	SKN St. Pölten II	30	10	8	12	46	51	−5	38	
12	Wiener Sportklub	30	10	7	13	53	55	−2	37	
13	SV Mattersburg II	30	9	9	12	42	48	−6	36	
14	SV Stegersbach (R)	30	9	9	12	33	49	−16	36	Relegation to Austrian Landesliga
15	SR Donaufeld Wien (R)	30	7	10	13	44	61	−17	31	Relegation to Austrian Landesliga
16	SV Neuberg (R)	30	1	6	23	23	95	−72	9	Relegation to Austrian Landesliga

Source: Weltfussball
Rules for classification: 1) Points; 2) Goal difference; 3) Goals scored
(C) Champions; (R) Relegated

== Regionalliga Mitte ==
Pos	Team	Pld	W	D	L	GF	GA	GD	Pts	Qualification or relegation
1	SK Austria Klagenfurt (C, P)	30	20	5	5	68	26	+42	65	Qualification to Promotion play-offs
2	SK Vorwärts Steyr	30	18	5	7	46	30	+16	59	
3	FC Blau-Weiß Linz	30	16	6	8	53	34	+19	54	
4	SC Weiz	30	16	6	8	57	41	+16	54	
5	SV Lafnitz	30	16	4	10	54	28	+26	52	
6	USV Allerheiligen	30	15	4	11	54	44	+10	49	
7	SK Sturm Graz II	30	13	7	10	55	43	+12	46	
8	SC Kalsdorf	30	12	7	11	52	49	+3	43	
9	FC Pasching	30	12	7	11	46	49	−3	43	
10	Wolfsberger AC II	30	12	4	14	41	47	−6	40	
11	Union Gurten	30	9	10	11	37	48	−11	37	
12	SV Wallern	30	9	7	14	35	50	−15	34	
13	Union St. Florian	30	8	7	15	34	56	−22	31	
14	SAK Klagenfurt	30	6	6	18	29	62	−33	24	
15	UVB Vöcklamarkt (R)	30	5	6	19	26	46	−20	21	Relegation to Austrian Landesliga
16	ATSV Wolfsberg (R)	30	4	7	19	23	57	−34	19	Relegation to Austrian Landesliga

Source: Weltfussball
Rules for classification: 1) Points; 2) Goal difference; 3) Goals scored
(C) Champions; (P) Promoted; (R) Relegated

== Regionalliga West ==
Pos	Team	Pld	W	D	L	GF	GA	GD	Pts	Promotion or relegation
1	SV Austria Salzburg (C, P)	30	23	4	3	71	23	+48	73	Promotion to Austrian First League
2	WSG Wattens	30	21	6	3	81	22	+59	69	
3	TSV St. Johann	30	12	11	7	51	35	+16	47	
4	USC Eugendorf	30	15	2	13	53	48	+5	47	
5	FC Kitzbühel	30	11	10	9	46	40	+6	43	
6	TSV Neumarkt	30	13	4	13	51	58	−7	43	
7	FC Dornbirn 1913	30	12	5	13	46	43	+3	41	
8	FC Kufstein	30	12	5	13	56	59	−3	41	
9	SV Seekirchen 1945	30	10	10	10	40	46	−6	40	
10	SC Schwaz	30	10	9	11	42	37	+5	39	
11	FC Wacker Innsbruck II	30	11	5	14	58	61	−3	38	
12	FC Pinzgau Saalfelden	30	10	7	13	47	49	−2	37	
13	FC Hard	30	8	8	14	41	50	−9	32	
14	SCR Altach II	30	10	1	19	33	70	−37	31	
15	FC Bizau (R)	30	8	5	17	27	68	−41	29	Relegation to Austrian Landesliga
16	FC Höchst (R)	30	3	10	17	20	54	−34	19	Relegation to Austrian Landesliga

Source: Weltfussball
Rules for classification: 1) Points; 2) Goal difference; 3) Goals scored
(C) Champions; (P) Promoted; (R) Relegated

== Promotion play-offs ==
Due to SC Ritzing failure to get a Bundesliga license, SC-ESV Parndorf 1919, who finished second in the Ost division, and SK Austria Klagenfurt, who finished first in the Mitte division, will participate in a two-legged tie. The winner on aggregate score after both matches will be promoted to the Austrian Football First League.

=== First leg ===
5 June 2015
19:00

SC-ESV Parndorf 1919	2–1	SK Austria Klagenfurt
Rasic 26'; Karner 90'	Report	Rep 61'

Heidebodenstadion, Parndorf
Attendance: 1,750
Referee: Harald Lechner

=== Second leg ===
9 June 2015
19:20

SK Austria Klagenfurt	4–1 (a.e.t.)	SC-ESV Parndorf 1919
Eler 26'; Prawda 85'; Dušak 105'; Rep 120' (pen.)	Report	Steinacher 84' (pen.)

Wörthersee Stadion, Klagenfurt
Attendance: 4,500
Referee: Alexander Harkam
