= 2016–17 Austrian Regionalliga =

Austrian Regional League
- Season: 2016–17
- Champions: First Vienna FC (Ost); TSV Hartberg (Mitte); USK Anif (West)
- Promoted: TSV Hartberg
- Relegated: SC Ritzing; SV Grieskirchen; ATSV Wolfsberg; USC Eugendorf; SV Austria Salzburg; Salzburger AK 1914
- Matches: 690
- Goals: 2,177 (3.16 per match)

The 2016–17 season was the 58th season of the Regionalliga, the third-tier football league in Austria, since its establishment in 1959.

== Regionalliga Ost ==
Pos	Team	Pld	W	D	L	GF	GA	GD	Pts	Qualification or relegation
1	First Vienna FC (Note: First Vienna was initially demoted before the season ended for insolvency. The club was eventually readmitted.) (C)	28	20	5	3	61	20	+41	65	
2	SC Ritzing (Note: SC Ritzing withdrew its license for the First League and voluntarily withdrew to the II. Liga Mitte (level 5).) (R)	28	15	6	7	59	37	+22	51	Withdrawal to II. Liga
3	FK Austria Wien II	28	14	8	6	41	29	+12	50	
4	FC Stadlau	28	11	11	6	39	24	+15	44	
5	SC Mannsdorf	28	12	8	8	47	45	+2	44	
6	ASK Ebreichsdorf	28	12	5	11	51	53	−2	41	
7	SKU Amstetten	28	9	12	7	42	32	+10	39	
8	FCM Traiskirchen	28	10	8	10	39	40	−1	38	
9	SC-ESV Parndorf 1919	28	8	13	7	38	41	−3	37	
10	SK Rapid Wien II	28	10	6	12	49	44	+5	36	
11	FC Admira Wacker Mödling II	28	7	7	14	39	42	−3	28	
12	Wiener Sportklub	28	5	13	10	30	33	−3	28	
13	SC Neusiedl am See 1919	28	6	7	15	33	58	−25	25	
14	SKN St. Pölten II (O)	28	7	3	18	30	62	−32	24	Qualification to relegation play-offs
15	SV Schwechat (Note: Reprieved from relegation.)	28	4	8	16	25	63	−38	20	

Rules for classification: 1) Points; 2) Goal difference; 3) Goals scored
(C) Champions; (O) Play-off winners; (R) Relegated

== Regionalliga Mitte ==
Pos	Team	Pld	W	D	L	GF	GA	GD	Pts	Promotion or relegation
1	TSV Hartberg (C, P)	30	19	5	6	74	38	+36	62	Promotion to Austrian First League
2	SV Lafnitz	30	18	6	6	54	27	+27	60	
3	FC Gleisdorf 09	30	17	8	5	53	35	+18	59	
4	ATSV Stadl-Paura	30	16	3	11	75	33	+42	51	
5	Deutschlandsberger SC	30	12	10	8	65	45	+20	46	
6	SK Vorwärts Steyr	30	12	8	10	56	49	+7	44	
7	SC Kalsdorf	30	13	5	12	38	35	+3	44	
8	Union Gurten	30	11	9	10	39	43	−4	42	
9	Union St. Florian	30	10	9	11	36	46	−10	39	
10	SK Sturm Graz II	30	9	10	11	42	51	−9	37	
11	SC Weiz	30	10	8	12	40	52	−12	38	
12	SK Austria Klagenfurt	30	10	5	15	43	61	−18	35	
13	USV Allerheiligen	30	9	6	15	46	60	−14	33	
14	FC Pasching/LASK Linz II	30	8	7	15	43	49	−6	31	
15	SV Grieskirchen (R)	30	5	8	17	44	64	−20	23	Relegation to Austrian Landesliga
16	ATSV Wolfsberg (R)	30	5	4	21	25	65	−40	19	Relegation to Austrian Landesliga

Rules for classification: 1) Points; 2) Goal difference; 3) Goals scored
(C) Champions; (P) Promoted; (R) Relegated

== Regionalliga West ==
Pos	Team	Pld	W	D	L	GF	GA	GD	Pts	Qualification or relegation
1	USK Anif (C)	30	26	2	2	99	28	+71	80	
2	SV Grödig	30	22	4	4	70	20	+50	70	
3	SC Rheindorf Altach II	30	15	3	12	48	48	0	48	
4	TSV St. Johann	30	13	6	11	48	42	+6	45	
5	SC Schwaz	30	12	8	10	46	39	+7	44	
6	FC Wacker Innsbruck II	30	12	7	11	48	46	+2	43	
7	FC Kufstein	30	12	5	13	53	51	+2	41	
8	FC Dornbirn 1913	30	9	12	9	33	43	−10	39	
9	VfB Hohenems	30	10	8	12	49	50	−1	38	
10	SV Seekirchen 1945	30	10	8	12	51	57	−6	38	
11	FC Hard	30	9	10	11	46	54	−8	37	
12	FC Pinzgau Saalfelden	30	9	7	14	33	47	−14	34	
13	SV Wörgl	30	10	3	17	40	61	−21	33	
14	USC Eugendorf (R)	30	7	9	14	40	66	−26	30	Relegation to Austrian Landesliga
15	SV Austria Salzburg (R)	30	4	11	15	43	62	−19	23	Relegation to Austrian Landesliga
16	Salzburger AK 1914 (R)	30	5	7	18	34	67	−33	22	Relegation to Austrian Landesliga

Rules for classification: 1) Points; 2) Goal difference; 3) Goals scored
(C) Champions; (R) Relegated

== Direct promotion ==
No team from the Regionalliga West or Ost applied for promotion, therefore the promotion play-offs were cancelled. Instead, only one team, the Regionalliga Mitte champion, was promoted to the Austrian Football First League.

== Relegation play-offs ==
In relegation play-offs for the Regionalliga Ost, SKN St. Pölten II, as the worst placed second team in the East, had to compete against SV Mattersburg II since only four amateur teams are allowed in the regional league.
'

Team 1	Agg.	Team 2	1st leg	2nd leg
SKN St. Pölten II	4–2	SV Mattersburg II	1–2	3–0

== Top scorers ==
As of end of season.

Rank	Scorer	Club	Goals
1	(Austria) Mario Petter	Stadl-Paura	31
2	(Austria) Mersudin Jukić	Grödig	25
3	(Austria) Dario Tadić	Hartberg	23
3	(Turkey) Yusuf Efendioğlu	Steyr	23
5	(Austria) Christian Dengg	DSC	22
6	(Austria) Manuel Krainz	Anif	20
7	(Austria) David Witteveen	Ritzing	19
8	(Austria) Eyup Erdoğan	Anif	18
8	(Austria) Alexander Frank	Austria II	18
8	(North Macedonia) Mensur Kurtiši	First Vienna	18
8	(Switzerland) Gabriel Lüchinger	Altach II	18
