= Markus Berger =

Austrian footballer (born 1985)

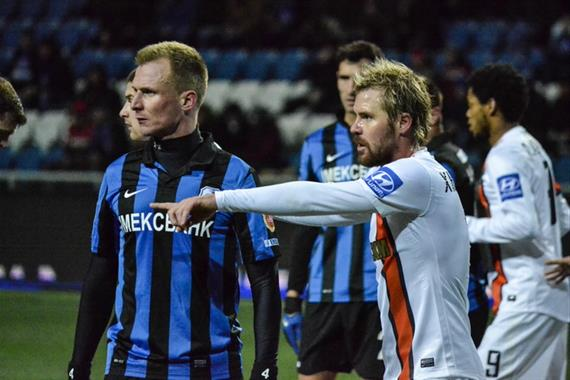
- Berger (left) in action for Chornomorets

Personal information
- Date of birth: 21 January 1985 (age 41)
- Place of birth: Salzburg, Austria
- Height: 1.86 m (6 ft 1 in)
- Position: Centre-back

Team information
- Current team: Universitatea Craiova (assistant)

Youth career
- 1993–1999: Wüstenrot Salzburg
- 1999–2002: VfB Stuttgart
- 2002–2004: Eintracht Frankfurt

Senior career*
Years	Team	Apps	(Gls)
2002–2004	Eintracht Frankfurt II	24	(2)
2004–2007	Ried	61	(1)
2007–2011	Académica	71	(5)
2012–2014	Chornomorets	52	(0)
2014	Start	11	(1)
2014–2015	Ural Sverdlovsk Oblast	3	(0)
2015	Gil Vicente	11	(1)
2015–2016	Tondela	3	(0)
2016–2018	Grödig	41	(3)
2018–2020	SAK 1914	39	(3)
Total		316	(16)

International career
2001–2003	Austria U19	12	(1)
2002–2006	Austria U21	34	(0)
2004	Austria Olympic	1	(0)

Managerial career
- 2018–2020: SAK 1914 (player-assistant)
- 2020–2021: SV Seekirchen U18
- 2021–2024: AKA Vorarlberg U18 (individual coach)
- 2024–2025: Red Bull Salzburg U12
- 2025–: Universitatea Craiova (assistant)
- * Club domestic league appearances and goals

Markus Berger (born 21 January 1985) is an Austrian former professional footballer who played as a central defender, currently assistant coach at Liga I club Universitatea Craiova.

== Playing career ==
Berger was born in Salzburg. He started his professional career at SV Ried, helping to promotion to the Bundesliga in his first year, and played 14 games as the team finished a best-ever runner-up in 2006–07. Primeira Liga side Académica de Coimbra signed him in July 2007, as a free agent; after going almost unnoticed throughout the season, he scored in his fifth match with the Students in a 3–0 away win against S.L. Benfica.

Berger was first choice in his last two years with Académica, totalling four league goals in the process. In January 2009, he went on a trial period with Hibernian from the Scottish Premier League, and his agent later claimed that a loan deal had been agreed between the clubs with Hibs having the option to buy the player at the end of the campaign for £500,000, but the move was not completed.

On 30 December 2011, after nearly 100 official appearances for Académica, Berger penned a three-year contract at Ukrainian Premier League's FC Chornomorets Odesa. At the start of March 2014, he left his team due to the civil unrest caused by the 2014 Ukrainian revolution, going on to sign for Tippeligaen club IK Start later that month. He made his debut on 6 April in a 3–1 home victory over FK Haugesund, in which he also scored his first goal.

In June 2014, after only a few months in Norway, Berger moved to the Russian Premier League with FC Ural Sverdlovsk Oblast. However, in January of the following year, he returned to Portugal by signing with Gil Vicente F.C. until the end of the season.

Having suffered relegation, Berger agreed to a one-year deal with C.D. Tondela in early July 2015. He returned to his country on 20 June 2016, joining Regional League West side SV Grödig.

== Coaching career ==
Berger retired on 15 June 2020 aged 35, his last club being Salzburger AK 1914. He planned to stay connected to the sport as a manager.

In June 2024, Berger was appointed head coach of FC Red Bull Salzburg's under-12 squad.

== Personal life ==
Berger's older brother, Hans-Peter, was also a footballer.

== Honours ==
Ried

- Erste Liga: 2004–05

Académica

- Taça de Portugal: 2011–12

Chornomorets

- Ukrainian Cup runner-up: 2012–13
- Ukrainian Super Cup runner-up: 2013

SAK 1914

- Regionalliga Salzburg: 2019–20
- Salzburger Liga: 2018–19
