= 2012–13 Austrian Regionalliga =

Austrian Regional Leagues
- Season: 2012–13
- Champions: Parndorf; LASK Linz; Liefering
- Promoted: Parndorf; Liefering
- Relegated: Ritzing; Ostbahn; 1. Simmeringer SC; Kapfenberger II; Feldkirchen; Leoben; Grazer AK (withdrew); Wals-Grünau; Andelsbuch; Saalfelden
- Europa League: Pasching

The 2012–13 season of the Regionalliga was the 54th season of the third-tier football league in Austria, since its establishment in 1959.

The league is composed of 48 teams divided into three groups of 16 teams each, whose teams are divided geographically (Eastern, Central and Western). Teams play only other teams in their own division.

== Regionalliga East ==
Pos	Team	Pld	W	D	L	GF	GA	GD	Pts	Qualification or relegation
1	Parndorf (C, P)	30	20	7	3	65	32	+33	67	Qualification to Promotion play-offs
2	Austria (Am)	30	19	7	4	69	39	+30	64	
3	Team Wien	30	15	10	5	59	39	+20	55	
4	Admira (Am)	30	13	13	4	58	38	+20	52	
5	Amstetten	30	14	9	7	52	25	+27	51	
6	Mattersburg (Am)	30	14	8	8	67	48	+19	50	
7	Rapid Wien (Am)	30	11	9	10	55	43	+12	42	
8	Stegersbach	30	12	6	12	45	51	−6	42	
9	SV Oberwart	30	10	11	9	44	46	−2	41	
10	Sollenau	30	11	6	13	42	48	−6	39	
11	Retz	30	11	4	15	58	72	−14	37	
12	Wiener Sport-Club	30	10	6	14	51	51	0	36	
13	Schwechat	30	7	5	18	42	64	−22	26	
14	Ritzing (R)	30	7	4	19	30	72	−42	25	Relegation to Austrian Landesliga
15	Ostbahn (R)	30	5	8	17	40	64	−24	23	Relegation to Austrian Landesliga
16	1. Simmeringer SC (R)	30	1	7	22	16	61	−45	10	Relegation to Austrian Landesliga

Source: Standings
Rules for classification: 1) points; 2) goal difference; 3) number of goals scored.
(C) Champions; (P) Promoted; (R) Relegated

== Regionalliga Central ==
Pos	Team	Pld	W	D	L	GF	GA	GD	Pts	Qualification or relegation
1	LASK Linz (C)	28	21	5	2	75	15	+60	68	Qualification to Promotion play-offs
2	FC Pasching	28	21	3	4	64	19	+45	66	Qualification to Europa League play-off round (Note: By winning the 2012–13 Austrian Cup)
3	SAK Klagenfurt	28	13	8	7	54	48	+6	47	
4	SC Kalsdorf	28	12	7	9	62	48	+14	43	
5	Villacher SV	28	12	7	9	46	40	+6	43	
6	Union St. Florian	28	11	4	13	34	37	−3	37	
7	USV Allerheiligen	28	10	6	12	46	52	−6	36	
8	SK Austria Klagenfurt	28	9	8	11	40	48	−8	35	
9	FC Gratkorn	28	9	7	12	50	53	−3	34	
10	SV Wallern	28	7	13	8	24	31	−7	34	
11	Union Vöcklamarkt	28	8	9	11	38	46	−8	33	
12	SK Sturm Graz II	28	9	5	14	37	48	−11	32	
13	Kapfenberger SV II (R)	28	7	6	15	27	50	−23	27	Relegation to Austrian Landesliga
14	SV Feldkirchen (R)	28	5	8	15	36	69	−33	23	Relegation to Austrian Landesliga
15	DSV Leoben (R)	28	3	10	15	32	61	−29	19	Relegation to Austrian Landesliga
16	Grazer AK (R)	0	0	0	0	0	0	0	0	Withdrew on 29 October 2012, results annulled

Rules for classification: 1) points; 2) goal difference; 3) number of goals scored.
(C) Champions; (R) Relegated

== Regionalliga West ==
Pos	Team	Pld	W	D	L	GF	GA	GD	Pts	Qualification or relegation
1	Liefering (C, P)	30	23	5	2	94	23	+71	74	Qualification for the Promotion play-offs
2	A. Salzburg	30	21	5	4	77	21	+56	68	
3	Wattens	30	18	5	7	73	49	+24	59	
4	Kufstein	30	16	6	8	70	41	+29	54	
5	Bregenz	30	15	5	10	58	43	+15	50	
6	Salzburg (Am)	30	13	8	9	50	43	+7	47	
7	Seekirchen	30	13	4	13	43	44	−1	43	
8	Dornbirn	30	13	2	15	48	51	−3	41	
9	Innsbruck (Am)	30	11	7	12	60	60	0	40	
10	Johann	30	9	10	11	39	44	−5	37	
11	Altach (Am)	30	9	9	12	41	49	−8	36	
12	Neumarkt	30	9	7	14	47	69	−22	34	
13	Hard	30	9	5	16	36	64	−28	32	
14	Wals-Grünau (R)	30	5	8	17	37	69	−32	23	Relegation to Austrian Landesliga
15	Andelsbuch (R)	30	6	5	19	32	75	−43	23	Relegation to Austrian Landesliga
16	Saalfelden (R)	30	3	3	24	27	87	−60	12	Relegation to Austrian Landesliga

Source: Standings
Rules for classification: 1) points; 2) goal difference; 3) number of goals scored.
(C) Champions; (P) Promoted; (R) Relegated

== Promotion playoffs ==
Due to the forced relegation of FC Lustenau 07, the last placed team in the second division, FC Linz, did not have to be directly relegated to the Regionalliga, but instead plays a relegation play-out against the Regionalliga East, Parndorf 1919. In the second playoff, the Regionalliga Central champions, LASK Linz, play against the Regionalliga West champions, FC Liefering.

3 June 2013 L1	Parndorf 1919	2–1	FC Linz	Parndorf
				Stadium: Heidebodenstadion

7 June 2013 L2	FC Linz	0–1 (1–3 agg.)	Parndorf 1919	Linz

Parndorf wins 3–1 on aggregate and is promoted to the Second Division.

L1	FC Liefering	2–0	FC Linz	Wals-Siezenheim
				Stadium: Red Bull Arena

L2	FC Linz	0–3 (0–5 agg.)	FC Liefering	Linz

Linz loses 5–0 on aggregate and remains in the Third Division.
