= Anouar El Moukhantir =

German footballer (born 1997)

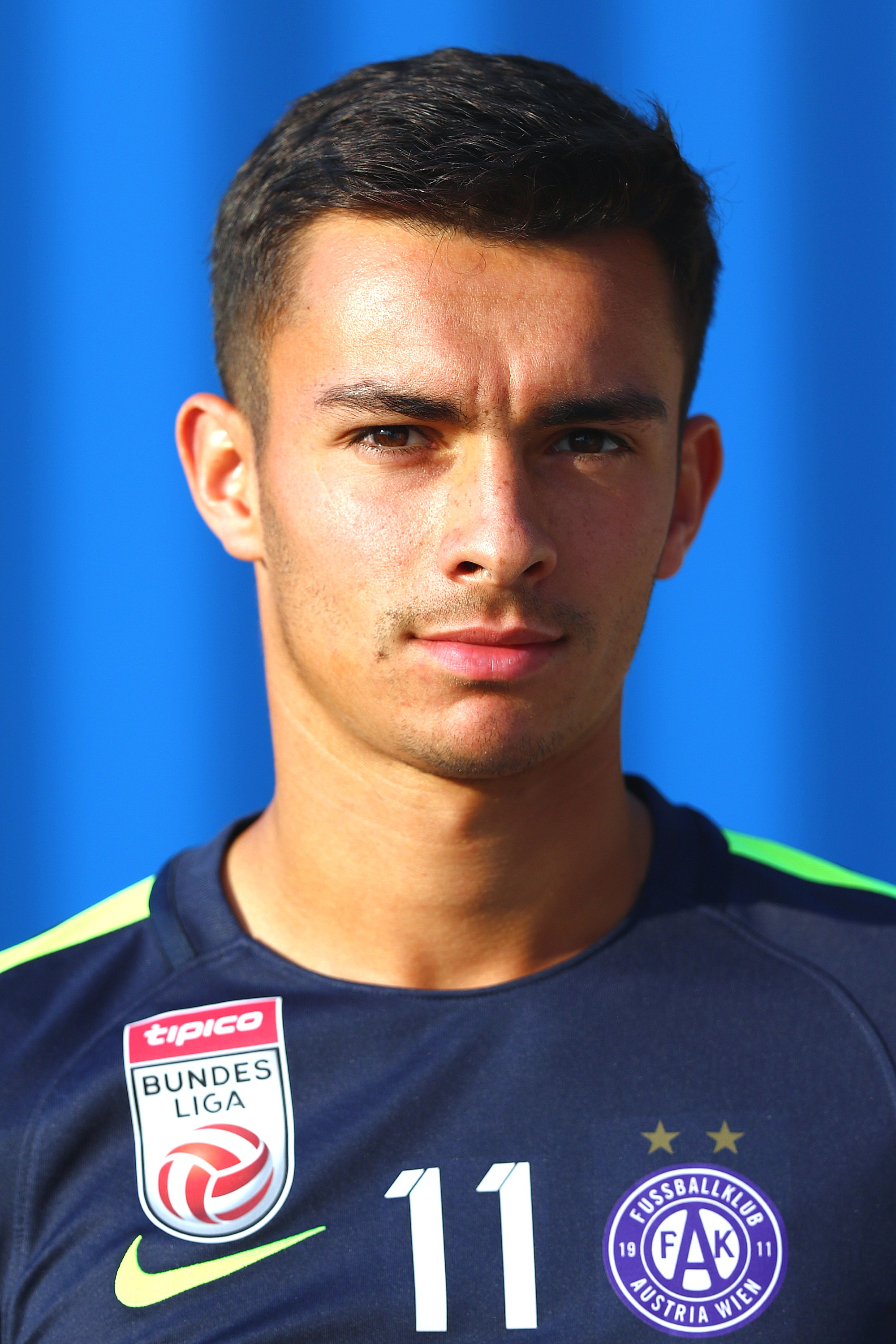
- El Moukhantir with Austria Wien in 2018

Personal information
- Full name: Anouar Ahmed El Moukhantir
- Date of birth: 30 August 1997 (age 29)
- Place of birth: Darmstadt, Germany
- Height: 1.72 m (5 ft 8 in)
- Position: Midfielder

Team information
- Current team: Admira Wacker
- Number: 17

Youth career
- 2006–2011: 1. Simmeringer SC
- 2011–2015: Austria Wien

Senior career*
Years	Team	Apps	(Gls)
2015–2023	Austria Wien II	152	(20)
2023	Lahti	8	(3)
2024–	Admira Wacker	24	(0)
- * Club domestic league appearances and goals as of 12 June 2025

Anouar Ahmed El Moukhantir (born 30 August 1997) is a German professional footballer who plays as a midfielder for Austrian 2. Liga club Admira Wacker.

== Career ==
A former youth academy player of 1. Simmeringer, El Moukhantir moved to Austria Wien in 2011. He made his debut for club's reserve side on 20 March 2015 in a Regionalliga match against Admira Wacker II. On 7 June 2019, he extended his contract with the club until June 2023.

On 11 August 2023, Finnish club Lahti announced the signing of El Moukhantir for a contract until the end of the year. On 31 January 2024, he returned to Austria by signing for Admira Wacker.

== Personal life ==
El Moukhantir is of Moroccan descent.

== Career statistics ==
As of match played 27 September 2024

Appearances and goals by club, season and competition
Club	Season	League			Cup		Continental		Total	
Club	Season	Division	Apps	Goals	Apps	Goals	Apps	Goals	Apps	Goals
Austria Wien II	2014–15	Austrian Regionalliga	1	0	—		—		1	0
Austria Wien II	2015–16	Austrian Regionalliga	6	0	—		—		6	0
Austria Wien II	2016–17	Austrian Regionalliga	24	0	—		—		24	0
Austria Wien II	2017–18	Austrian Regionalliga	26	3	—		—		26	3
Austria Wien II	2018–19	Austrian 2. Liga	24	3	—		—		24	3
Austria Wien II	2019–20	Austrian 2. Liga	27	4	—		—		27	4
Austria Wien II	2020–21	Austrian 2. Liga	24	8	—		—		24	8
Austria Wien II	2021–22	Austrian 2. Liga	0	0	—		—		0	0
Austria Wien II	2022–23	Austrian 2. Liga	20	2	—		—		20	2
Austria Wien II	Total		152	20	0	0	0	0	152	20
Lahti	2023	Veikkausliiga	8	3	—		—		8	3
Admira Wacker	2023–24	Austrian 2. Liga	13	0	—		—		13	0
Admira Wacker	2024–25	Austrian 2. Liga	5	0	2	0	—		7	0
Admira Wacker	Total		18	0	2	0	—		20	0
Career total			178	23	2	0	0	0	180	23
