= 2011–12 Austrian Regionalliga =

Austrian Regional Leagues
- Season: 2011–12
- Champions: Horn; Grazer AK; Wattens
- Promoted: Horn
- Relegated: Admira Amateure; Neusiedl; Columbia; Vorwärts Steyr; Gleinstätten; LASK Linz B; Union Innsbruck; Seekirchen; Hall

The 2011–12 season of the Regionalliga was the 53rd season of the third-tier football league in Austria, since its establishment in 1959.

In the three Regional Leagues (East, Central, and West), teams played two heats for advancement into the First League. Two of the three teams would qualify. In 2011–12, the champion of the Regional League West (WSG Wattens) met the Regional League East champion SV Horn in the qualification, while the Regional League Central champion GAK met the First League last-place finisher. Insofar as the relegated teams did not have other arrangements, three teams had to move down to the fourth level league.

== Method ==
The Regional Leagues East, West, and Central constitute the third level of play in Austrian soccer. The Regional League East is made up of the clubs in the Vienna, Lower Austria, and Burgenland soccer associations. The Regional League Central is composed of clubs in the Upper Austria, Carinthia, and Styria soccer associations. The Regional League West is made up of the clubs in the Salzburg, Tyrol, and Vorarlberg soccer associations.

Clubs in these leagues play for a relegation place in the First League. The prerequisite for a possible promotion is the granting of a license by the fifth senate of the Bundesliga.

The three last place teams of the Regional Leagues have to move down to the fourth level of play. If more clubs move down from the First League, the number of clubs that must move down to the fourth level will go up as well. If two clubs move down from the First League that belong to the federal states that comprise the Regional League Central, four teams from the Regional League Central would need to move down.

== Regional League East ==
=== Championship final standings ===
Pos	Team	Pld	W	D	L	GF	GA	GD	Pts	Qualification or relegation
1	SV Horn	30	18	10	2	70	23	+47	64	Qualification to Promotion play-offs
2	SK Rapid Wien II	30	19	5	6	57	25	+32	62	
3	FK Austria Wien II	30	14	7	9	60	38	+22	49	
4	SC-ESV Parndorf 1919 (Note: Relegation loser)	30	13	6	11	46	39	+7	45	
5	Wiener Sportklub	30	11	10	9	48	51	−3	43	
6	SV Stegersbach (Note: Promoted from the Landesliga)	30	11	8	11	56	54	+2	41	
7	SC Ritzing	30	11	8	11	37	53	−16	41	
8	1. SC Sollenau	30	12	4	14	75	67	+8	40	
9	Floridsdorfer AC	30	10	10	10	36	29	+7	40	
10	SKU Amstetten	30	11	6	13	43	54	−11	39	
11	SV Mattersburg II	30	10	8	12	46	49	−3	38	
12	SV Schwechat	30	9	10	11	39	39	0	37	
13	1. Simmeringer SC	30	9	10	11	40	48	−8	37	
14	FC Admira Wacker Mödling II (R)	30	11	4	15	45	58	−13	37	Relegation to Austrian Landesliga
15	SC Neusiedl am See (R)	30	11	3	16	47	58	−11	36	Relegation to Austrian Landesliga
16	SC Columbia Floridsdorf (R)	30	4	3	23	27	88	−61	15	Relegation to Austrian Landesliga

(R) Relegated

=== Promoted from the Landesligen ===
- Viennese City League: SC Ostbahn XI
- Landesliga Lower Austria: SC Retz
- Burgenland League: SV Oberwart

== Regional League Central ==
=== Championship final standings ===
Pos	Team	Pld	W	D	L	GF	GA	GD	Pts	Qualification or relegation
1	Grazer AK	30	22	4	4	80	29	+51	70	Qualification to Promotion play-offs
2	Villacher SV (Note: Promoted from the Landesliga)	30	15	8	7	45	30	+15	53	
3	SAK Klagenfurt	30	13	9	8	44	41	+3	48	
4	Union Vöcklamarkt	30	13	9	8	44	42	+2	48	
5	DSV Leoben	30	14	5	11	43	34	+9	47	
6	SK Austria Klagenfurt	30	13	6	11	44	36	+8	45	
7	FC Gratkorn (Note: Relegated from the First League)	30	12	8	10	50	49	+1	44	
8	Union St. Florian	30	11	8	11	38	33	+5	41	
9	SK Sturm Graz II	30	11	8	11	41	39	+2	41	
10	SV Allerheiligen	30	10	10	10	38	35	+3	40	
11	Kapfenberger SV II	30	11	7	12	47	46	+1	40	
12	FC Pasching	30	10	8	12	41	40	+1	38	
13	FC Wels (R)	30	9	9	12	32	42	−10	36	Relegation to Austrian Landesliga
14	SK Vorwärts Steyr (R)	30	6	9	15	36	58	−22	27	Relegation to Austrian Landesliga
15	SV Gleinstätten (R)	30	7	4	19	32	54	−22	25	Relegation to Austrian Landesliga
16	LASK Linz II (R)	30	6	2	22	28	75	−47	20	Relegation to Austrian Landesliga

(R) Relegated

=== Promoted from the Landesligen ===
- Landesliga Upper Austria: SV Wallern
- Landesliga Styria: SC Kalsdorf
- Landesliga Carinthia: SV Feldkirchen

== Regional League West ==
=== Championship final standings ===
Pos	Team	Pld	W	D	L	GF	GA	GD	Pts	Qualification or relegation
1	WSG Wattens (Note: Relegation loser)	30	23	7	0	67	14	+53	76	Qualification to Promotion play-offs
2	USK Anif	30	22	4	4	82	38	+44	70	
3	FC Dornbirn 1913	30	19	7	4	72	30	+42	64	
4	FC Red Bull Salzburg II	30	14	10	6	72	48	+24	52	
5	FC Kufstein	30	14	4	12	58	44	+14	46	
6	Wacker Innsbruck II	30	14	3	13	58	53	+5	45	
7	SC Rheindorf Altach II	30	11	7	12	49	44	+5	40	
8	SV Austria Salzburg	30	12	4	14	54	54	0	40	
9	TSV St. Johann im Pongau	30	10	9	11	43	47	−4	39	
10	SC Bregenz	30	10	8	12	47	45	+2	38	
11	FC Pinzgau Saalfelden (Note: Promoted from the Landesliga)	30	11	5	14	50	55	−5	38	
12	FC Hard	30	9	5	16	39	66	−27	32	
13	TSV Neumarkt am Wallersee	30	8	7	15	44	71	−27	31	
14	FC Union Innsbruck (R)	30	7	3	20	35	87	−52	24	Voluntary relegation to Austrian Landesliga
15	SV Seekirchen 1945	30	4	8	18	33	65	−32	20	
16	SV Hall (R)	30	5	3	22	27	69	−42	18	Relegation to Austrian Landesliga

(R) Relegated

=== Promoted from the Landesligen ===
- Salzburg League: SV Wals-Grünau
- Landesliga Tyrol: no promoted club
- Landesliga Vorarlberg: FC Andelsbuch
