= Tadej Žagar-Knez =

Slovenian footballer

Personal information
- Date of birth: 12 August 1991 (age 35)
- Place of birth: Slovenia
- Position: Midfielder

Team information
- Current team: SC Aspang
- Number: 16

Youth career
- 2005-2010: Šampion

Senior career*
Years	Team	Apps	(Gls)
2010–2012	Šampion	30	(4)
2012–2013	Aluminij	23	(2)
2013–2014	Celje	21	(0)
2014–2016	SAK Klagenfurt	46	(17)
2016	Nafta 1903	3	(0)
2017	SAK Klagenfurt	12	(4)
2017–2018	Austria Klagenfurt	26	(7)
2018	TuS Bad Gleichenberg	4	(1)
2019	Bravo	7	(0)
2019–2022	FC Großklein	39	(33)
2022–2023	SVU Gleinstätten	37	(24)
2024-	SC Aspang	0	(0)
- * Club domestic league appearances and goals as of 10 February 2024

Tadej Žagar-Knez (born 12 August 1991) is a Slovenian football midfielder who plays for SC Aspang.

== Career ==
After two years in Austria with SAK Klagenfurt, where he also won the 2015–16 player of the season in the Kärntner Liga, Žagar-Knez moved back to Slovenia and joined NK Nafta 1903. A half year later, he returned to SAK Klagenfurt. After six months, he joined Austria Klagenfurt.

In summer 2018, he joined TuS Bad Gleichenberg. In February 2019, he joined NK Bravo. In summer 2019, he returned to Austria and joined FC Großklein.
