= Matthias Seidl =

Austrian footballer (born 2001)

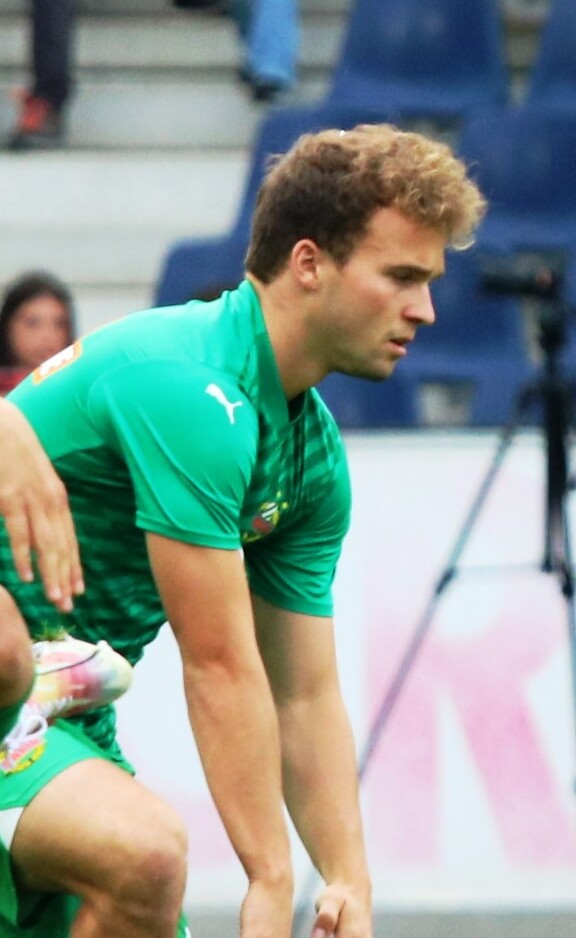
- Seidl in 2023

Personal information
- Date of birth: 24 January 2001 (age 25)
- Place of birth: Salzburg, Austria
- Height: 1.75 m (5 ft 9 in)
- Position: Attacking midfielder

Team information
- Current team: Rapid Wien
- Number: 18

Youth career
- –2009: SV Kuchl
- 2009–2015: Red Bull Salzburg
- 2015: SV Kuchl
- 2015–2017: SV Grödig

Senior career*
| Years | Team | Apps | (Gls) |
| 2017–2021 | SV Kuchl | | |
| 2021–2023 | Blau-Weiß Linz | 56 | (21) |
| 2023– | Rapid Wien | 102 | (11) |

International career^{‡}
| 2019 | Austria U18 | 2 | (0) |
| 2019–2020 | Austria U20 | 5 | (1) |
| 2023– | Austria | 8 | (1) |
- * Club domestic league appearances and goals as of 24 October 2026 ‡ National team caps and goals as of 14 November 2024

Matthias Seidl (born 24 January 2001) is an Austrian professional footballer who plays as an attacking midfielder for Austrian Bundesliga club Rapid Wien and the Austria national team.

== Club career ==
Seidl started his senior team career with SV Kuchl in the Austrian fourth tier Salzburger Liga helping them win promotion to into the third tier Regionalliga Salzburg in 2019. For the 2021–22 season he joined second division team Blau-Weiß Linz, becoming one of their key players in winning the league title and being promoted to the Austrian Football Bundesliga at the end of the 2022–23 season and being named player of the season in the 2. Liga.

In June 2023 Rapid Wien announced that Seidl would join the club prior to 2022–23 season.

== International career ==
Seidl was called up to the Austria national team for a set of UEFA Euro 2024 qualifying matches in September 2023.

He then made his national team debut in September 2023 when he came on as a substitute for Konrad Laimer in the 87th minute of the World Cup qualifying game against Sweden.

== Personal life ==
Seidl is the brother of fellow footballer Simon Seidl.

== Career statistics ==
=== Club ===
As of match played 27 October 2026

Appearances and goals by club, season and competition
| Club | Season | League | | | Cup | | Continental | | Other | | Total | |
| Club | Season | Division | Apps | Goals | Apps | Goals | Apps | Goals | Apps | Goals | Apps | Goals |
|---|---|---|---|---|---|---|---|---|---|---|---|---|
| SV Kuchl | 2018–19 | Salzburger Liga | 2 | 2 | — | | — | | — | | 2 | 2 |
| SV Kuchl | 2019–20 | Regionalliga Salzburg | 5 | 2 | — | | — | | — | | 5 | 2 |
| SV Kuchl | 2020–21 | Regionalliga Salzburg | 3 | 4 | — | | — | | — | | 3 | 4 |
| SV Kuchl | Total | | 10 | 8 | — | | — | | — | | 10 | 8 |
| Blau-Weiß Linz | 2021–22 | Austrian 2. Liga | 30 | 9 | 3 | 4 | — | | — | | 33 | 13 |
| Blau-Weiß Linz | 2022–23 | Austrian 2. Liga | 26 | 12 | 3 | 2 | — | | — | | 29 | 14 |
| Blau-Weiß Linz | Total | | 56 | 21 | 6 | 6 | 0 | 0 | 0 | 0 | 62 | 27 |
| Rapid Wien | 2023–24 | Austrian Bundesliga | 32 | 5 | 5 | 2 | 4 (Note: Appearances in UEFA Conference League) | 1 | — | | 41 | 8 |
| Rapid Wien | 2024–25 | Austrian Bundesliga | 32 | 2 | 2 | 0 | 16 (Note: Six appearances and two goals in UEFA Europa League, ten appearances in UEFA Conference League) | 2 | — | | 50 | 3 |
| Rapid Wien | 2025–26 | Austrian Bundesliga | 28 | 3 | 4 | 0 | 10 | 2 | — | | 42 | 5 |
| Rapid Wien | 2026–27 | Austrian Bundesliga | 10 | 1 | 2 | 1 | 6 | 0 | — | | 18 | 2 |
| Rapid Wien | Total | | 102 | 11 | 13 | 3 | 36 | 5 | — | | 151 | 19 |
| Career total | | | 167 | 40 | 19 | 9 | 36 | 5 | 0 | 0 | 223 | 56 |

=== International ===
As of match played 14 November 2024

Appearances and goals by national team and year
| National team | Year | Apps | Goals |
|---|---|---|---|
| Austria | 2023 | 3 | 0 |
| Austria | 2024 | 5 | 1 |
| Total | | 8 | 1 |

Scores and results list Austria's goal tally first, score column indicates score after each Seidl goal.

List of international goals scored by Matthias Seidl
| No. | Date | Venue | Opponent | Score | Result | Competition |
|---|---|---|---|---|---|---|
| 1. | 10 October 2024 | Raiffeisen Arena, Linz, Austria | Kazakhstan | 4–0 | 4–0 | 2024–25 UEFA Nations League B |

== Honours ==
Blau-Weiß Linz

- 2. Liga: 2022–23

Individual

- 2. Liga Player of the Season: 2022–23
- 2. Liga Team of the Season: 2022–23
