= Regionalliga Salzburg =

- Founded: 2019
- Country: Austria
- Number of clubs: 10
- Level on pyramid: 3
- Promotion to: Second League
- Relegation to: Salzburger Liga
- Domestic cup: Austrian Cup
- Current: 2025–26

The Regionalliga Salzburg is a third-tier division of Austrian football introduced in the 2019–20 season as one of the successor of the Austrian Regionalliga West. It covers the Austrian state of Salzburg and is one of five leagues at this level.

== 2019–20 reformation ==
Due to high travel costs, the Vorarlberg and Tyrol clubs decide to leave the Austrian Regionalliga West and form their own Elite ligas, forcing Salzburg to do so as well. The Eliteliga were divided in a Regionalliga Salzburg, Regionalliga Tirol and Eliteliga Vorarlberg in the fall with 10 clubs each. The two best teams of these three regional leagues play in an Eliteliga play-off for promotion to the 2nd league.

Due to the COVID-19 pandemic, the 2020-21 season was halted in October 2020 with SV Kuchl top of the table. It was planned to resume in March 2021.

== 2021–22 member clubs ==
- USK Anif
- Bischofshofen SK 1933
- SV Grödig
- SV Kuchl
- FC Pinzgau Saalfelden
- Salzburger AK 1914
- SV Seekirchen
- SV Wals-Grünau
Location of teams in 2021-Spring Regionalliga Salzburg
