= Alexander Michlmayr =

Austrian footballer (born 2003)

Personal information
- Date of birth: 11 April 2003 (age 23)
- Place of birth: Steyr, Austria
- Height: 1.76 m (5 ft 9 in)
- Position: Forward

Team information
- Current team: LASK II
- Number: 7

Youth career
- 2009–2017: ATSV Neuzeug
- 2017–2020: LASK

Senior career*
Years	Team	Apps	(Gls)
2020–2022	Juniors OÖ	68	(8)
2022	LASK	1	(0)
2022-	LASK II	43	(10)

International career^{‡}
2018	Austria U16	2	(0)
2019	Austria U17	2	(0)
2021	Austria U18	1	(0)
- * Club domestic league appearances and goals as of 4 May 2025 ‡ National team caps and goals as of 26 March 2022

Alexander Michlmayr (born 11 April 2003) is an Austrian footballer who plays as a forward for LASK II.

== Club career ==
On 7 February 2022, Michlmayr signed with Austrian Football Bundesliga club LASK. As LASK and Sulzner's previous club Juniors OÖ are under a cooperation agreement, he is eligible to play for either club. Having played one match for the LASK Bundesliga team, he then continued in the club's amateur division which plays in Austria's Regionalliga Centre. In a match in May 2024 against SPG Wels he collided with a player of the opposing team and was injured so severely that the match had to be terminated early.

== Career statistics ==
=== Club ===
As of 4 May 2025.

Appearances and goals by club, season and competition
Club	Season	League			Cup		Continental		Other		Total	
Club	Season	Division	Apps	Goals	Apps	Goals	Apps	Goals	Apps	Goals	Apps	Goals
Juniors OÖ	2019–20	2. Liga	8	1	0	0	–		0	0	8	1
Juniors OÖ	2020–21	2. Liga	22	2	0	0	–		0	0	22	2
Juniors OÖ	2021–22	2. Liga	29	3	0	0	–		0	0	29	3
LASK	2021–22	Bundesliga	1	0	0	0	–		0	0	1	0
LASK II	2022–23	Regionalliga Central	17	2	0	0	–		0	0	17	2
LASK II	2023–24	Regionalliga Central	18	4	0	0	–		0	0	18	4
LASK II	2024–25	Regionalliga Central	8	4	0	0	–		0	0	8	4
Career total			103	16	0	0	0	0	0	0	103	16
