= Regionalliga West (disambiguation) =

Regionalliga West (English: Regional League West) may refer to a number of sports leagues in Austria and Germany.

- Austrian Regional League West, a tier-three league in Austrian football
- Regionalliga West, a tier-four league in German football
- Regionalliga West (1963–1974), a now defunct tier-two league in German football, existing from 1963 to 1974
