= Austrian Regionalliga South =

- Organising body: ÖFB
- Founded: 2026
- Country: Austria
- Confederation: UEFA
- Number of clubs: 16 in two state groups
- Level on pyramid: Level 3
- Promotion to: 2. Liga
- Relegation to: Kärntner Liga; Landesliga Steiermark
- Domestic cup: Austrian Cup
- Current: 2026–27

The Austrian Regionalliga South, known in German as the Regionalliga Süd, is a men's football league in Austria and one of four divisions that make up the third tier of the Austrian football league system. It covers the states of Styria and Carinthia, together with the East Tyrol exclave, whose clubs are registered with the Carinthian association. The other three divisions at this level are the Regionalliga East, the Regionalliga North and the Regionalliga West.

The division was created for the 2026–27 season as part of a reform that took the third tier from three divisions to four. It replaced the Regionalliga Central, which was dissolved at the same time and whose Upper Austrian clubs went to the new Regionalliga North.

Alone among the four divisions, the Regionalliga South is not played as a single table. Sixteen clubs, eight from each state, contest separate state groups in the autumn before dividing into a championship play-off and a qualification play-off in the spring.

== History ==
=== Background ===
Styrian and Carinthian clubs had played in the Regionalliga Central since its revival in 1994, alongside clubs from Upper Austria. Travel was a persistent complaint, with sides in south east Styria facing round trips of some 330 kilometres to Upper Austrian opponents, and the cost of those journeys became the main argument for breaking the division up.

=== Creation ===
The ÖFB presidium ordered a review of the third level in May 2024. A working group examined several models and consulted clubs across the country, and the Carinthian and Styrian associations presented the format agreed for their region on 19 May 2025. The presidium confirmed the wider four-division structure the following month.

Reporting in June 2025 by ORF and by the Upper Austrian association indicated that the Styria and Carinthia division would keep the Regionalliga Central name. The two associations concerned had used the name Regionalliga Süd from May 2025, and that name was adopted.

All clubs from the two states that had taken part in the 2025–26 Regionalliga Central qualified automatically for the new division. The remaining places were filled from the state leagues, with four clubs coming up from the Kärntner Liga on the Carinthian side. Where a club declines a place in the Regionalliga South, its state association nominates another club from its own top division instead.

== Format ==
In the autumn the sixteen clubs play only within their own state, eight in the Regionalliga South Carinthia and eight in the Regionalliga South Styria, meeting home and away over fourteen rounds.

The field then splits for the spring. The top four from each group, eight clubs in all, contest a championship play-off over a further fourteen rounds to decide the Regionalliga South title. Points from the autumn are not carried into it, so the play-off begins level. The bottom four from each group contest a qualification play-off of the same length for their places in the division, and there half the points earned in the autumn are carried over. One club from each state is relegated, to the Kärntner Liga or the Landesliga Steiermark as appropriate. Clubs that are not promoted return to their own state group for the following autumn.

No champion goes up automatically. The winners of the four Regionalligen contest two-legged ties for two places in the 2. Liga, and the pairings are drawn before each season. For 2026–27 the Regionalliga South champion was drawn against the Regionalliga East champion, with the first legs on 1 and 2 June 2027 and the return matches on 4 and 5 June. A club must hold a 2. Liga licence before it can be promoted.

== Inaugural season ==
The first season began on 31 July 2026.

Clubs in the 2026–27 season
Carinthia group	Styria group
Austria Klagenfurt	Allerheiligen (Note: Listed by some sources as SV Allerheiligen.)
Bleiburg	Deutschlandsberger SC
Donau Klagenfurt	Eggendorf/Hartberg Amateure (Note: A playing partnership between FSC Eggendorf and the amateur side of TSV Hartberg.)
Treibach	Gleisdorf
Velden	Kalsdorf
Völkermarkt	Lafnitz
Wolfsberg	Tillmitsch
Wolfsberger AC Amateure	Weiz

The most prominent club in the new division is Austria Klagenfurt, which had played in the Bundesliga as recently as May 2025. Insolvency proceedings were opened against the club in February 2026, and under the licensing regulations of the Bundesliga association a club in insolvency is placed last in the table at the end of the season and relegated. Austria Klagenfurt chose not to appeal, forgoing its 2. Liga licence, and completed the 2025–26 campaign before restarting in the third tier. The club's reserve side was relegated from the Kärntner Liga in the same year.

== See also ==
- Austrian Regionalliga
- Austrian football league system
