= Austrian Regionalliga North =

- Organising body: ÖFB
- Founded: 2026
- First season: 2026–27
- Country: Austria
- Confederation: UEFA
- Number of clubs: 15 (2026–27); 16 normally
- Level on pyramid: Level 3
- Promotion to: 2. Liga
- Relegation to: OÖ Liga; Salzburger Liga
- Domestic cup: Austrian Cup
- Current: 2026–27

The Austrian Regionalliga North, known in German as the Regionalliga Nord, is a men's football league in Austria and one of four divisions that make up the third tier of the Austrian football league system. It is contested by clubs of the Upper Austrian and Salzburg football associations, covering the states of Upper Austria and Salzburg. The other three divisions at this level are the Regionalliga East, the Regionalliga South and the Regionalliga West.

The division was created for the 2026–27 season as part of a reform that took the third tier from three divisions to four. It brought together two states that had previously played in separate divisions. Upper Austrian clubs came from the Regionalliga Central, which was dissolved at the same time, and Salzburg clubs left the Regionalliga West.

The statute provides for sixteen clubs, eight from each state. Salzburg filled only seven of its places for the first season, so the division began with fifteen in 2026.

== History ==
=== Background ===
Until 2026 the third tier consisted of three divisions. Upper Austrian clubs played in the Regionalliga Central alongside sides from Styria and Carinthia, while Salzburg clubs played in the Regionalliga West with Tyrol and Vorarlberg. Travel was a long-standing complaint in both, and the cost of those journeys became the main argument for redrawing the map.

=== Creation ===
The ÖFB presidium ordered a review of the third level in May 2024, and in June 2025 settled on four divisions from 2026–27. The new division was to be played across the whole season as a single supra-regional competition, home and away, with sixteen clubs drawn equally from the two states. The Upper Austrian association's presidium adopted a resolution setting out how its eight clubs would be determined.

Clubs from either state that were relegated from the 2. Liga at the end of 2025–26 qualified for the new division, as did the Salzburg clubs of the 2025–26 Regionalliga West and the Upper Austrian clubs of the 2025–26 Regionalliga Central. The remaining places were filled from the state leagues.

== Format ==
The statute provides for sixteen clubs as a rule, with the 2026–27 season played by fifteen as an exception. The division is open to first teams and to the amateur sides of Bundesliga clubs. Clubs play each other home and away, and the club top of the table at the end of the season is champion. The Regionalliga East and Regionalliga West use the same arrangement, while the Regionalliga South splits into state groups in the autumn and decides its title in a spring play-off.

No champion is promoted automatically. The winners of the four Regionalligen contest two-legged ties for two places in the 2. Liga, with the pairings drawn before each season. For 2026–27 the Regionalliga North champion was drawn against the Regionalliga West champion. A club must hold a 2. Liga licence before it can go up.

At the other end, the best-placed promotion-eligible club in each of the OÖ Liga and the Salzburger Liga, the top divisions of the two state associations, comes up at the end of each season.

== Inaugural season ==
Fifteen clubs contested the first season, eight from Upper Austria and seven from Salzburg.

Clubs in the 2026–27 season
Upper Austria	Salzburg
Bad Leonfelden	Grödig
Bad Schallerbach	Hallein
Dietach	Kuchl
Gurten	Pinzgau Saalfelden
LASK Amateure OÖ	Seekirchen
Junge Wikinger Ried (Note: The amateur side of SV Ried.)	St. Johann im Pongau
Vorwärts Steyr	Wals-Grünau
Wallern/St. Marienkirchen (Note: A playing partnership between SV Wallern and ASV St. Marienkirchen.)	

== See also ==
- Austrian Regionalliga
- Austrian football league system
