= Marco Hesina =

Austrian footballer

Personal information
- Date of birth: 6 December 1991 (age 34)
- Height: 1.85 m (6 ft 1 in)
- Position: Forward

Team information
- Current team: Wacker Innsbruck
- Number: 22

Senior career*
Years	Team	Apps	(Gls)
2007	Wacker Tirol	1	(0)
2008–2011	SV Hall		
2011–2016	WSG Wattens	49	(26)
2015–2016	→ Wacker Innsbruck (loan)	1	(0)
2016–2017	Wacker Innsbruck	5	(0)
2016–2017	→ Wacker Innsbruck II	8	(6)
2017–2018	FC Kufstein	11	(5)
2018–2019	SV Hall	19	(16)
2019–	FC Union Innsbruck	5	(5)
- * Club domestic league appearances and goals as of 26 October 2019

Marco Hesina (born 6 December 1991) is an Austrian footballer currently playing for FC Union Innsbruck in the Tiroler Liga.
