= Michael Tieber =

Austrian footballer

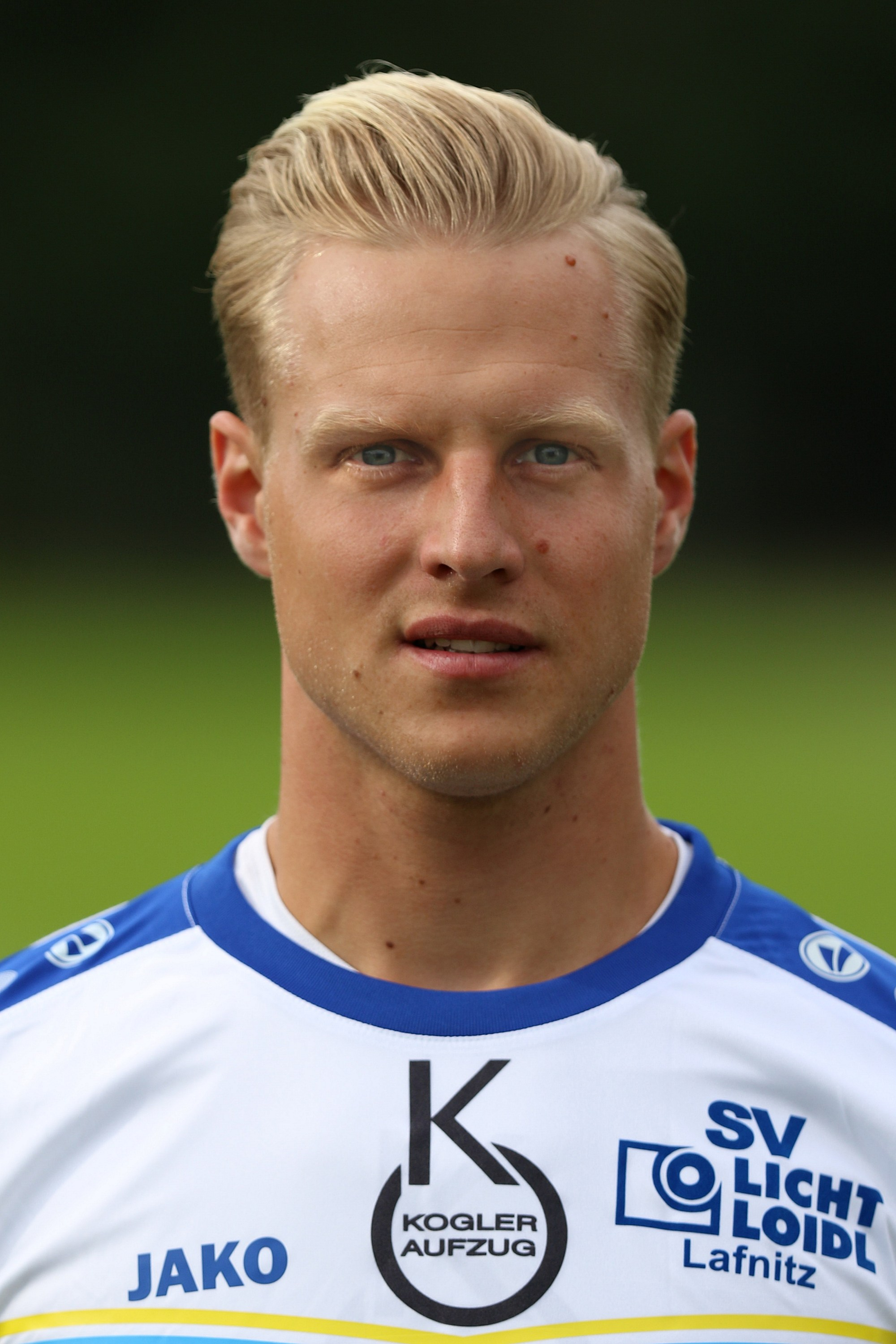

Personal information
- Full name: Michael Tieber
- Date of birth: 4 September 1988 (age 38)
- Place of birth: Weiz, Austria
- Height: 1.75 m (5 ft 9 in)
- Position: Forward

Team information
- Current team: DUSV Loipersdorf
- Number: 11

Youth career
- SC Weiz

Senior career*
Years	Team	Apps	(Gls)
2007–2009	Grazer AK	60	(21)
2010–2012	Kapfenberger SV	30	(2)
2011–2012	Kapfenberger SV B	20	(2)
2012–2013	TSV Hartberg	31	(2)
2013–2014	SC Kalsdorf	30	(25)
2014–2015	Wiener Neustadt	17	(1)
2015–	SV Lafnitz	82	(39)
- * Club domestic league appearances and goals as of 13 June 2018

Michael Tieber (born 4 September 1988) is an Austrian footballer who plays for DUSV Loipersdorf.
