= Regionalliga Tirol =

- Founded: 2019
- Country: Austria
- Number of clubs: 14
- Level on pyramid: 4
- Promotion to: Austrian Regionalliga West
- Relegation to: Tiroler Liga
- Domestic cup(s): Austrian Cup
- Current: 2021–22

The Regionalliga Tirol is a fourth-tier division of Austrian football introduced in the 2019–20 season as one of the successor of the Austrian Regionalliga West. It covers the Austrian state of Tyrol and is one of five leagues at this level.

== 2019–20 reformation ==
Due to high travel costs, the Vorarlberg and Tyrol clubs decide to leave the Austrian Regionalliga West and form their own Elite ligas, forcing Salzburg to do so as well. The Eliteliga were divided in a Regionalliga Salzburg, Regionalliga Tirol and Eliteliga Vorarlberg in the fall with 10 clubs each. The two best teams of these three regional leagues play in an Eliteliga play-off for promotion to the 2nd league.

Due to the COVID–19 pandemic, the 2020–21 season was halted in October 2020 with FC Kitzbühel topping the table. It was planned to resume in March 2021.

== 2020–21 member clubs ==
- Hall
- Imst
- Kitzbühel
- Kufstein
- Reichenau
- Schwaz
- Telfs
- Wacker Innsbruck II
- Wörgl
- WSG Tirol II
Location of teams in 2020–21 Regionalliga Tirol
