= Manuel Krainz =

Austrian footballer

Personal information
- Date of birth: 26 March 1992 (age 34)
- Height: 1.76 m (5 ft 9 1/2 in)
- Position: Midfielder

Team information
- Current team: SAK 1914
- Number: 11

Youth career
- 1997–2002: FC Bergheim
- 2002–2006: USV Elixhausen
- 2006–2008: USC Eugendorf
- 2008: SV Hallwang 1968
- 2008–2009: USC Eugendorf

Senior career*
Years	Team	Apps	(Gls)
2009–2016	USC Eugendorf		
2016–2017	USK Anif	30	(20)
2017–2019	Blau-Weiß Linz	50	(3)
2019–	SAK 1914	5	(4)
- * Club domestic league appearances and goals as of 22:16, 22 August 2019 (UTC)

Manuel Krainz (born 26 March 1992) is an Austrian football player. He plays for Salzburger AK 1914.

== Club career ==
He made his Austrian Football First League debut for FC Blau-Weiß Linz on 21 July 2017 in a game against FC Wacker Innsbruck.
