= 1960–61 Austrian football championship =

43rd season of top-tier football league in Austria

Austrian football championship
- Season: 1960–61
- Champions: Austria Wien

The 1960–61 Austrian Staatsliga A was the 50th edition of top flight football in Austria.

== Overview ==
It was contested by 14 teams, and Austria Wien won the championship.

== League standings ==
Pos	Team	Pld	W	D	L	GF	GA	GD	Pts
1	FK Austria Wien	26	17	5	4	68	31	+37	39
2	First Vienna FC	26	13	6	7	63	41	+22	32
3	Wiener AC	26	13	6	7	60	41	+19	32
4	Wiener Sportclub	26	13	6	7	71	52	+19	32
5	Grazer AK	26	11	8	7	53	37	+16	30
6	SK Rapid Wien	26	13	4	9	49	42	+7	30
7	Linzer ASK	26	11	6	9	56	50	+6	28
8	1. Wiener Neustädter SC	26	10	5	11	58	67	−9	25
9	SVS Linz	26	9	6	11	53	58	−5	24
10	1. Simmeringer SC	26	7	7	12	42	52	−10	21
11	1. Schwechater SC	26	8	5	13	37	49	−12	21
12	SV Austria Salzburg	26	8	4	14	45	54	−9	20
13	SC Wacker	26	6	8	12	39	56	−17	20
14	FC Dornbirn	26	3	4	19	37	101	−64	10

Source: rsssf.com

== Results ==
Home \ Away	ASZ	AWI	DOR	FIR	GAK	LIN	RWI	SCH	SIM	SLI	WAK	WAC	WNE	WIE
Austria Salzburg		0–7	1–5	3–1	1–2	5–1	1–3	2–1	2–3	1–3	0–0	1–2	1–4	3–0
Austria Wien	1–3		3–0	3–0	3–2	2–1	2–2	4–0	3–0	2–0	5–0	1–3	5–1	3–1
Dornbirn	0–9	0–2		3–5	1–9	1–7	2–6	1–1	1–3	1–1	6–1	0–8	1–2	1–5
First Vienna	6–1	2–2	4–0		0–3	1–2	4–2	2–1	5–1	1–1	3–1	0–0	1–1	3–3
Grazer AK	3–2	1–1	2–0	1–0		1–4	2–1	0–0	3–1	3–1	1–2	1–3	1–2	0–2
Linzer ASK	0–2	5–1	2–5	1–6	1–1		1–3	0–3	4–1	3–0	1–1	1–0	0–2	3–2
Rapid Wien	2–1	1–2	3–1	3–1	1–0	1–5		2–3	1–0	3–1	1–0	0–3	5–1	3–3
1. Schwechater SC	2–1	1–1	2–1	1–3	0–4	0–2	0–1		0–0	0–1	6–2	4–0	2–3	1–4
Simmeringer SC	1–1	1–1	4–0	1–0	1–1	0–0	1–2	1–2		2–3	0–0	3–2	4–5	1–3
SVS Linz	1–1	1–2	7–2	1–3	1–3	1–1	3–2	1–1	4–4		3–4	0–3	6–2	2–5
Wacker Wien	0–1	4–3	2–2	0–2	2–2	0–0	3–0	4–0	2–3	1–2		1–2	3–2	3–4
Wiener AC	1–1	0–2	5–1	2–4	2–2	4–2	1–1	3–1	2–1	2–3	1–1		4–1	2–0
Wiener Neustädter SC	3–0	1–5	5–0	3–5	3–3	1–3	0–0	4–2	2–4	4–2	1–1	3–3		0–2
Wiener SC	2–1	1–2	2–2	1–1	2–2	6–6	1–0	2–3	3–1	2–4	5–1	6–2	4–2	

Legend: Blue = home team win; Yellow = draw; Red = away team win.
