= ATSV Stadl-Paura =

Austrian football club

The Arbeiter-Turn- und Sportverein Stadl-Paura, simply known as ATSV Stadl-Paura, is a football team based in Stadl-Paura in Austria. As of the 2022–23 season, the club plays in the Oberösterreich Liga, the fourth tier of the Austrian football league system.
