= SC Weiz =

- Full name: Sportclub Weiz
- Nickname: Weizies
- Founded: 1924; 102 years ago
- Ground: Strobl Arena Weiz
- Capacity: 3,000
- Chairman: Martin Halper
- Manager: Maurice Amtmann
- League: Austrian Regionalliga South
- 2025–26: Austrian Regionalliga Central, 9th of 16
- Website: http://www.sc-weiz.at/

Sportclub Weiz is an Austrian football club based in Weiz, Styria, that competes in the Austrian Regionalliga South, one of the third-tiers of Austrian Football.
