= Weiz =

- Municipality
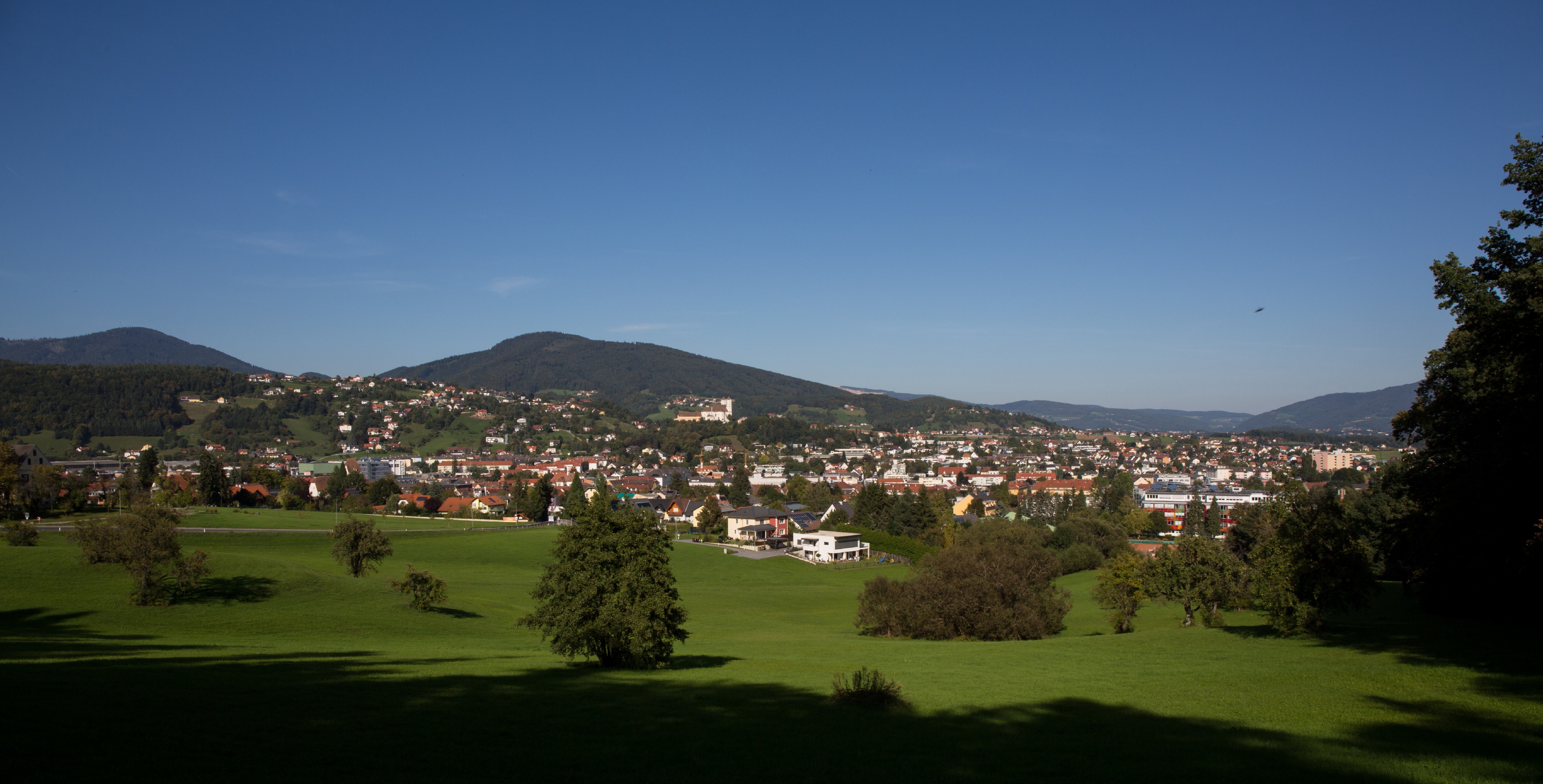
- Weiz seen from southwest

- Coat of arms

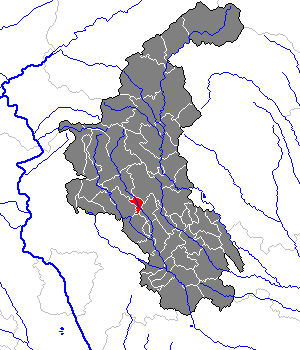
- Location within Weiz district

- Location within Austria
- Coordinates: 47°13′01″N 15°37′59″E
- Country: Austria
- State: Styria
- District: Weiz

Government
  - Mayor: Bettina Bauernhofer (SPÖ)

Area
  - Total: 17.51 km^{2} (6.76 sq mi)
- Elevation: 479 m (1,572 ft)

Population (2018-01-01)
  - Total: 11,627
  - Density: 664.0/km^{2} (1,720/sq mi)
- Time zone: UTC+1 (CET)
  - Summer (DST): UTC+2 (CEST)
- Postal code: 8160
- Area code: 03172
- Vehicle registration: WZ
- Website: www.weiz.at

Weiz (German pronunciation: [vaɪts]) is a town in the eastern part of the Austrian state of Styria.

== Population ==
Historical population
Year	Pop.	±%
1869	1,446	—
1880	1,646	+13.8%
1890	1,793	+8.9%
1900	2,256	+25.8%
1910	2,949	+30.7%
1923	3,882	+31.6%
1934	4,322	+11.3%
1939	4,748	+9.9%
1951	6,547	+37.9%
1961	8,134	+24.2%
1971	8,427	+3.6%
1981	8,402	−0.3%
1991	8,462	+0.7%
2001	8,926	+5.5%
2011	8,897	−0.3%

== International relations ==
=== Twin towns – Sister cities ===
Weiz is twinned with:

- Ajka, Hungary
- Grodzisk Mazowiecki, Poland
- Offenburg, Germany
