= Austrian Landesliga =

- Organising body: ÖFB state associations
- Founded: 1995 as a uniform fourth level
- Country: Austria
- Confederation: UEFA
- Divisions: 9
- Number of clubs: Varies by division
- Level on pyramid: 4
- Promotion to: Regionalliga
- Relegation to: Varies by state
- Domestic cup: Austrian Cup
- Current: 2026–27 Austrian Landesliga

The Austrian Landesliga is the fourth level of football in Austria. It consists of nine parallel divisions, one for each of the states of Austria, each run by the state association under the Austrian Football Association (ÖFB) rather than by the ÖFB centrally. The champion of each division is promoted to the Regionalliga that covers its region.

The level took its present shape gradually. State championships were revived after the First World War, served as the second level under the Ostmark and as the third level after 1945, and were pushed down to the fourth by the creation of the Bundesliga in 1974–75. Because the various Regionalligen were suspended at different times, several state divisions continued to operate as third level competitions well after that, and the Landesliga became a uniform fourth level only in 1995.

Not every division carries the Landesliga name. Two states have kept the titles their divisions acquired during the reorganisation of western Austrian football in 2019, and most of the rest play under a title sponsor's name.

== Format ==
Each division is run independently by its state association, and the number of clubs, the length of the season and the arrangements below it vary accordingly. Most divisions are contested by sixteen clubs over 30 matchdays.

The champion of each division is promoted to its Regionalliga. The number of clubs relegated in exchange varies from season to season and from state to state, because it depends both on how many clubs come down from the Regionalliga and on how the fifth level is organised in that state. Some states run a single second Landesliga, others divide the fifth level into several regional groups.

Most divisions play under a title sponsor's name, among them the 11teamsports 1. Landesliga in Lower Austria, the Burgenland Energie Landesliga, the Sparkassen Landesliga in Styria, the LT1 OÖ Liga and the HYPO TIROL Liga.

== History ==
The state championships emerged from the reorganisation of the Austrian federation after the First World War, when the ÖFV became the ÖFB. Once the association's dispute with the Association of Austrian Amateur Football Clubs, known as the VAFÖ, over amateur sport had been more or less settled, the ÖFB began in 1928–29 to organise an Austrian amateur championship contested by the amateur champions of the state associations.

That competition ended with the Anschluss in 1938, which banned the Austrian professional championship. The state amateur divisions were merged into the former professional structure and became the second level.

The Vienna league was reactivated as the top division for the three seasons from 1945–46, and the state championships restarted in practice in 1946–47. In July 1949 the newly founded Österreichische Fußball-Staatsliga was admitted to the ÖFB as its tenth member, alongside the nine state associations, and charged with running a national league in place of the Vienna one. Professionalism returned with it, at first in eastern Austria only. The new Staatsliga began with thirteen clubs, among them three state champions who were promoted into it: SV Gloggnitz of Lower Austria, Vorwärts Steyr of Upper Austria and Sturm Graz of Styria. The state championships became the third level from that point.

The Bundesliga reform of 1974–75 added a division at the top and pushed them down to the fourth. The change did not take effect everywhere at once, because the Regionalliga above them was not always staged. The divisions of Vienna, Lower Austria and Burgenland remained third level competitions from 1981 to 1985, those of Upper Austria, Styria and Carinthia from 1975 to 1994, and those of Salzburg, Tyrol and Vorarlberg from 1975 to 1977. The Landesliga has therefore been a uniform fourth level only since 1995.

== Divisions ==
State	Division	Feeds into
Vienna	Wiener Stadtliga	Regionalliga East
Lower Austria	1. Landesliga	Regionalliga East
Burgenland	Landesliga Burgenland	Regionalliga East
Upper Austria	OÖ Liga	Regionalliga North
Salzburg	Salzburger Liga	Regionalliga North
Styria	Landesliga Steiermark	Regionalliga South
Carinthia and East Tyrol	Kärntner Liga	Regionalliga South
Tyrol excluding East Tyrol	Regionalliga Tirol (Note: The Regionalliga Tirol and the Eliteliga Vorarlberg were created in 2019 as third level competitions when the Regionalliga West was broken up. They dropped to the fourth level when the Regionalliga West was restored in 2023–24, and the Tiroler Liga and the Vorarlbergliga became fifth level divisions beneath them.)	Regionalliga West
Vorarlberg	Eliteliga Vorarlberg	Regionalliga West

Until 2026 the nine divisions fed three Regionalligen, three states to each. The reform that took the third level from three divisions to four redrew those catchment areas. Salzburg left the west to join Upper Austria in the new Regionalliga North, and the Regionalliga Central was dissolved, its Styrian and Carinthian territory passing to the new Regionalliga South. Only the Regionalliga East still draws on three state associations.

== See also ==
- Austrian football league system
- Austrian Regionalliga
- Austrian 2. Landesliga
