= Kärntner Liga =

- Country: Austria
- Confederation: Austrian Football Association
- Number of clubs: 16
- Level on pyramid: 4
- Promotion to: Austrian Regional League Central
- Relegation to: Unterliga
- Current champions: ASK Klagenfurt (2022/23)
- Website: Official

The Kärntner Liga is the fourth highest division in Austrian football for clubs in the area of the province of Carinthia and the East Tyrol region, that belong to the Carinthian Football Association (German: Kärntner Fussballverband, KFV). Below the Kärntner Liga are the Unterliga West and Unterliga Ost.

== Mode ==
The Carinthian League is organized as a league system competition in which, since 2003/04, in principle 16 teams participate (previously there were usually 14 teams, in 2002/03 15). The game is played in 30 championship rounds, each divided into a home and away round. The games and venues are drawn at the beginning of the season. The champions acquired the title Kärnter Landesmeister and are given the right to a promotion into the Austrian Regional League Central.

== 2023–24 member clubs ==
- Austria Klagenfurt Amateure
- SVG Bleiburg
- SV Donau Klagenfurt
- ATUS Ferlach
- FC KAC 1909
- SAK Klagenfurt
- ASKÖ Köttmannsdorf
- SV Kraig
- SC Landskron
- FC Lendorf
- SV St. Jakob im Rosental
- SV Spittal/Drau
- SK Treibach
- ATUS Velden
- VST Völkermarkt
- ATSV Wolfsberg
Location of teams in 2023–24 Kärntner Liga
