= Austrian Regionalliga =

Regionalliga
- Organising body: ÖFB
- Founded: 1959; 67 years ago
- Country: Austria
- Confederation: UEFA
- Number of clubs: 63 (in 4 groups)
- Level on pyramid: 3
- Promotion to: 2. Liga
- Relegation to: Landesliga
- Domestic cup: Austrian Cup
- Current champions: Gloggnitz (East); Voitsberg (Central); Wacker Innsbruck (West) (2025–26)
- Current: 2026–27 Austrian Regionalliga

The Austrian Regionalliga (German: Regionalliga, plural Regionalligen, meaning Regional League) is the third level of Austrian football, below the Bundesliga and the 2. Liga. It is organised by the Austrian Football Association rather than by the Bundesliga, and it sits above the state leagues run by the nine regional associations.

Since the 2026–27 season the level has been divided into four parallel divisions. These are the Regionalliga East, the Regionalliga North, the Regionalliga South and the Regionalliga West.

The competition was founded in 1959 as the second tier of the Austrian league system and became the third tier in 1974. Its structure has changed repeatedly since. The Regionalliga Central was dissolved in 2026 after 32 seasons in its second spell, and clubs from Salzburg left the West at the same time to form the new North with Upper Austria.

== History ==
=== Tauernliga and Arlbergliga ===
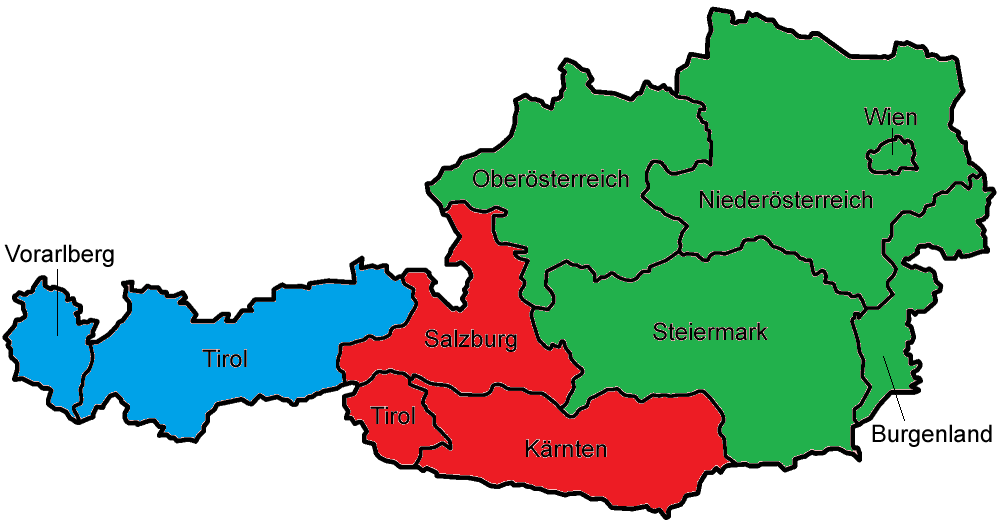
Austrian second division championships from 1950-1951 to 1959-1960.

With introduction of the Staatsliga A as the first division and the Staatsliga B as the second division of Austrian football in the 1949–50 season, also the teams from the Austrian states were allowed to play for the first time again in the highest leagues since the end of the second world war. This entailed also a change of the categorization in the amateur football. While Central and Eastern Austrian football teams played in the respective national leagues, from which the champions got promoted either directly or by play-offs (Relegationsspiele) to the Staatsliga B, the Western states did not participate in the Staatsliga B.

In 1949–50 the teams from Carinthia state (German: Kärnten) and Salzburg already played in the again-created Tauernliga and from 1955–56 to 1958–59 season in the Tauernliga South (Carinthia) and Tauernliga North (Salzburg). Besides the Arlbergliga consisted from 1950–51 to 1959–60 the clubs from Tyrol state (German: Tirol) and Vorarlberg state. These leagues can be regarded as second divisions (apart from the Staatsliga B) since their champions played in direct duels for promotion to the Staatsliga A.

==== Champions (1950–1960) ====
Year	Tauernliga	Tauernliga South	Tauernliga North	Arlbergliga
1950	Villacher SV	---	---	---
1951	Klagenfurter AC	---	---	SC Schwarz-Weiß Bregenz
1952	Salzburger AK 1914	---	---	SC Schwarz-Weiß Bregenz
1953	SV Austria Salzburg	---	---	Innsbrucker AC
1954	WSG Radenthein	---	---	SC Schwarz-Weiß Bregenz
1955	SK Austria Klagenfurt	---	---	FC Dornbirn 1913
1956	---	WSG Radenthein	SK Bischofshofen	SC Schwarz-Weiß Bregenz
1957	---	WSG Radenthein	SK Bischofshofen	SC Schwarz-Weiß Bregenz
1958	---	WSG Radenthein	SV Austria Salzburg	FC Lustenau 07
1959	---	WSG Radenthein	SV Austria Salzburg	FC Lustenau 07
1960	---	---	Salzburger AK 1914*	FC Dornbirn 1913

- In 1960, the Carinthian teams already played in the Central Regionalliga and the Tyrolean and Vorarlberg clubs were still in the Arlbergliga. For this reason the champion of the Salzburger Landesliga was entitled to deny the qualification matches against the champion of the Arlbergliga.

=== The Regionalliga and the Alpenliga ===
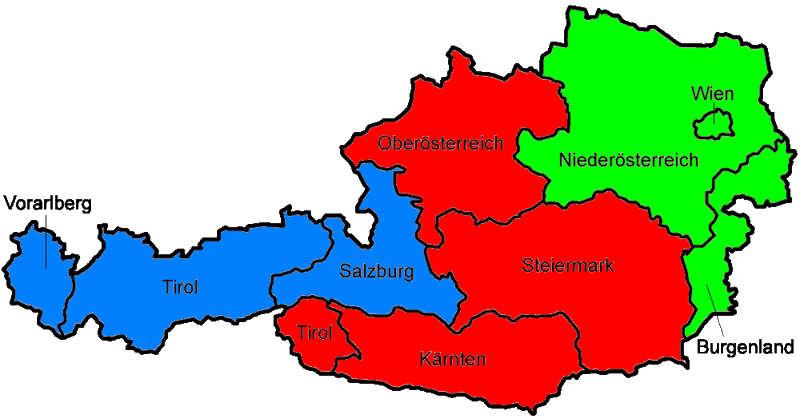
Each Regionalligas coverage from 1974 to 2026.

In the season of 1959–60, the Eastern and Central Regionalligen were established and one year later the Western Regionalliga. The Regionalligen counted up to the season of 1973–74 as football's second division in Austria. The respective champions were allowed to get promoted directly to the top level. In 1974–75 the introduction of the first and second Austrian Bundesliga happened, with in each case 10 clubs and to the abolish of the Western and Central Regionalligen. For the promotion to the 2nd Bundesliga, the champion of the Eastern Regionalliga, which was allowed to move upwards directly, and which the champions of the State Leagues (German: Landesligen) of Salzburg, Tyrol, Vorarlberg, Carinthia, Upper Austria (German: Oberösterreich) and Styria (German: Steiermark) those Play Offs (German: Relegationsspiele) had to complete in each case. In the 1977–78 season, the states of Salzburg, Tirol and Vorarlberg merged their Landesligen to Alpenliga as the 3rd division. In the 1980–81 season, the Western Regionalliga was once again introduced as the third division. The Eastern Regionalliga championship was not held from 1980–81 to 1983–84 and it would not be until the 1984–85 season that it would be reintroduced. Up until the 1995–96 season, the champions of the Western and Eastern Regionalligen earned a direct promotion to the 2nd Bundesliga. The Central Regionalliga, however, would not be reintroduced until the 1994–95 season. The champions of the regional organizations, the state football associations (German: Landesverbände) of Upper Austria, Carinthia (with East Tyrol (German: Osttirol)) and Styria had their only promotional spot to the 2nd division decided in play off matches.

Between the 1996–97 and 2003–04 seasons, the three champions of the Regionalligen together with the last one of the First Division (since the renaming of the First Division as Erste Liga the second highest division in Austria) played those Play Off matches to accomplish the two remaining promotional/relegation spots. After an expansion of the First Division to twelve clubs it was decided that - from the 2005–06 season - due to deprivation of pro league licenses (German: Lizenzentzügen) (at the time there were 10 slots), the winners of the regional leagues went up directly again. The First Division contracted back to ten teams in 2009–10, thus the number of promotions to and relegations from the second tier were reduced to two. Until 2013–14 one conference winner played the bottom First Division team, while the other conference winners contested the other promotion spot.

Until 2014–15 two teams are relegated from and promoted to the First Division. In 2014–15 the Western champions were directly promoted while those from the East and Central contested the other promotion place. In 2015–16 all three division winners were promoted to fill vacancies in the second tier and 2016–17 only the Central winners were promoted as the Eastern and Western champions declined promotion. At the end of 2017–18 all three Regionalliga champions and six other licensed teams went up when the second division, now the Second League, expanded from 10 to 16 clubs.

==== Champions (1960–2026) ====
Year	Regionalliga East	Regionalliga Central	Regionalliga West
(Jahr)	(Regionalliga Ost)	(Regionalliga Mitte)	(Regionalliga West)
1960	1. Schwechater SC	SV Stickstoff Linz	---
1961	SK Admira Wien	Kapfenberger SV	Salzburger AK 1914
1962	SC Wacker Wien	SK Austria Klagenfurt	SV Austria Salzburg
1963	1. Wiener Neustädter SC	Kapfenberger SV	FC Dornbirn 1913
1964	SC Wacker Wien	SK Sturm Graz	FC Wacker Innsbruck
1965	1. Simmeringer SC Wien	SK Austria Klagenfurt	SV Austria Salzburg
1966	SC Wacker Wien	SK Sturm Graz	SC Schwarz-Weiß Bregenz
1967	SC Eisenstadt	WSG Radenthein	SV Austria Salzburg
1968	SC Wacker Wien	WSV Donawitz	WSG Wattens
1969	First Vienna FC 1894 Wien	SK VÖEST Linz	FC Dornbirn 1913
1970	1. Simmeringer SC Wien	WSG Radenthein	SC Schwarz-Weiß Bregenz
1971	SC Eisenstadt	WSV Donawitz	SK Bischofshofen
1972	ESV Admira Wiener Neustadt	SK Austria Klagenfurt	SC Schwarz-Weiß Bregenz
1973	1. Simmeringer SC Wien	WSG Radenthein	FC Rätia Bludenz
1974	SV Heid Stockerau	Kapfenberger SV	FC Dornbirn 191
1975	SC Tulln	---	---
1976	Kremser SC	---	---
1977	ASV Kittsee	---	---
1978	Favoritner AC Wien	---	USK Anif
1979	SV Heid Stockerau	---	SpG Innsbruck
1980	SC Neusiedl 1919	---	Salzburger AK 1914
1981	---	---	ASK Salzburg
1982	---	---	IG Bregenz/Dornbirn
1983	---	---	SC Kufstein
1984	---	---	USV Salzburg
1985	1. Schwechater SC	---	IG Bregenz/Dornbirn II
1986	VfB Union Mödling	---	SC Kufstein
1987	VSE St. Pölten	---	USV Salzburg
1988	SV Stockerau	---	FC Dornbirn 1913
1989	ASV Austria Vösendorf	---	WSG Wattens
1990	SR Donaufeld Wien	---	FC Salzburg
1991	Favoritner AC Wien	---	SC Rheindorf Altach
1992	SV Oberwart	---	ASVÖ FC Puch bei Hallein
1993	1. Wiener Neustädter SC	---	FC Kufstein
1994	ASK Klingenbach	---	SC Austria Lustenau
1995	Favoritner AC Wien	SAK Klagenfurt	WSG Wattens
1996	SV Stockerau	TSV Hartberg	SC Schwarz-Weiß Bregenz
1997	ASK Kottingbrunn	SK Eintracht Wels	SC Rheindorf Altach
1998	SC Untersiebenbrunn	SK Austria Klagenfurt/VSV	SV Wörgl
1999	SC Untersiebenbrunn	TSV Hartberg	WSG Wattens
2000	SV Mattersburg	BSV Bad Bleiberg	FC Lustenau 07
2001	ASK Kottingbrunn	ASKÖ Pasching	FC Lustenau 07
2002	Wiener Sportklub	Kapfenberger SV	FC Hard
2003	SV Schwechat	FC Blau-Weiß Linz	SPG WSG Wattens/FC Wacker Tirol
2004	SC-ESV Parndorf 1919	FC Gratkorn	SC Rheindorf Altach
2005	FK Austria Wien Amateure	SC Schwanenstadt	FC Kufstein
2006	SC-ESV Parndorf 1919	TSV Hartberg	FC Lustenau 07
2007	ASK Schwadorf	SV Bad Aussee	Red Bull Salzburg Amateure
2008	SKN St. Pölten	1. FC Vöcklabruck	SV Grödig
2009	First Vienna FC	TSV Hartberg	FC Dornbirn 1913
2010	FC Waidhofen/Ybbs	Wolfsberger AC	SV Grödig
2011	SC-ESV Parndorf 1919	LASK Juniors	Red Bull Juniors
2012	SV Horn	Grazer AK	WSG Wattens
2013	SC-ESV Parndorf 1919	LASK Linz	FC Liefering
2014	FAC Team für Wien	LASK Linz	SV Austria Salzburg
2015	SC Ritzing	SK Austria Klagenfurt	SV Austria Salzburg
2016	SV Horn	FC Blau-Weiß Linz	WSG Wattens
2017	First Vienna FC	TSV Hartberg	USK Anif
2018	SV Horn	SV Lafnitz	USK Anif
2019	ASK Ebreichsdorf	Grazer AK	FC Dornbirn 1913
2020	No champions, season curtailed and voided due to COVID-19 pandemic in Austria
2021	Season curtailed in Ost and Mitte, no championship in West
2022	First Vienna FC	SK Sturm Graz II	No club applied for second division admission
2023	SV Stripfing	DSV Leoben	SC Schwarz-Weiß Bregenz
2024	SK Rapid Wien II	ASK Voitsberg	SV Austria Salzburg
2025	SR Donaufeld	Hertha Wels	SV Austria Salzburg
2026	SV Gloggnitz	ASK Voitsberg	Wacker Innsbruck

=== Four Regionalliga groups (2026–present) ===
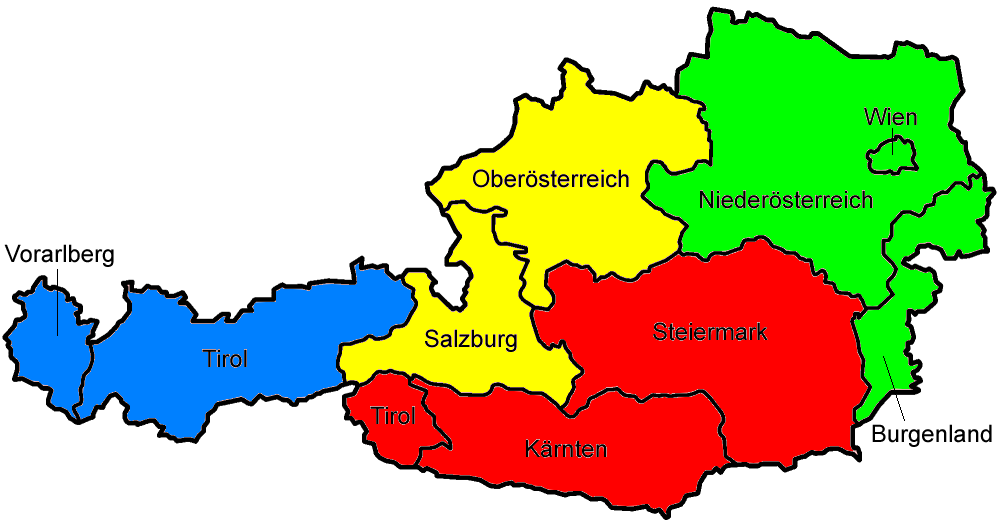
The four Regionalliga groups in place since the 2026–27 season

The ÖFB presidium ordered a review of the third level in May 2024. A working group weighed several models and consulted clubs from across the country, and in June 2025 the presidium settled on four divisions in place of three from the 2026–27 season. Travel costs were the main argument for the change. Clubs in south east Styria had faced round trips of some 330 kilometres to opponents in Upper Austria.

The Regionalliga Central was dissolved at the end of the 2025–26 season after 32 seasons in its second spell. Its clubs from Upper Austria were joined by clubs from Salzburg, who left the Regionalliga West, to form the new Regionalliga North. The remaining Central clubs, from Styria and Carinthia together with the East Tyrol exclave, formed the new Regionalliga South. The Regionalliga West was left with Tyrol and Vorarlberg, and the Regionalliga East was unchanged.

Each division was designed for sixteen clubs, giving 64 in total. Upper Austria filled its eight places in the North for the first season but Salzburg supplied only seven, leaving that division one short.

The East, North and West are each played as a single table over 30 matchdays, and the club top of the table at the end is champion. The South uses a split format. Eight clubs from Styria and eight from Carinthia play a double round within their own state in the autumn. The top four from each group then contest a spring championship play-off for the title, and the bottom four of each play a qualification play-off against relegation.

Direct promotion was abolished at the same time. One eligible club from each division enters a two-legged tie, and the two winners go up to the 2. Liga. A club must be both sporting qualified and in possession of a licence for the second tier, so the place can pass down the table if the champion does not apply or is refused. ASK Voitsberg of the Regionalliga Central were the last club promoted directly. The pairings for the play-off are drawn each season. For 2026–27 the East was drawn against the South and the West against the North, with the first legs on 1 and 2 June 2027 and the return matches on 4 and 5 June.

==== Champions (2027–present) ====
Year	Regionalliga East	Regionalliga North	Regionalliga South	Regionalliga West
(Jahr)	(Regionalliga Ost)	(Regionalliga Nord)	(Regionalliga Süd)	(Regionalliga West)
2027
