= SV Allerheiligen =

- Full name: SV Stein Reinisch Allerheiligen/Wildon
- Founded: 1967; 59 years ago
- Ground: Sportplatz USV Allerheiligen/Wildon
- Capacity: 460
- Chairman: Reinhard Hohl
- Manager: Tomislav Kocijan
- League: Austrian Regionalliga South
- 2025–26: Landesliga Steiermark, 3rd of 16 (promoted)
- Website: https://www.svallerheiligen.at/

SV Allerheiligen is an Austrian football club from Allerheiligen. The club was founded in 1967.
