= SV Seekirchen 1945 =

- Full name: Sportverein Seekirchen 1945
- Founded: 1945
- Ground: Sportzentrum Aug, Seekirchen am Wallersee
- Capacity: 1,000 seated
- Chairman: Peter Urdl
- Manager: Tomislav Jonjić
- League: Regionalliga North
- 2025–26: Regionalliga West, 4th of 17
- Website: https://www.svseekirchen.at/
Home colours	Away colours

Sportverein Seekirchen 1945 is a football club from Seekirchen am Wallersee, a city in Salzburg. The club plays in the Regionalliga North, the 3rd level of Austrian football.

The club was founded 1945 as Union Seekirchen and started playing in the league system in 1946. In 1997 they reached the Regionalliga for the first time.

== Current squad ==
As of 9 September 2026

Note: Flags indicate national team as defined under FIFA eligibility rules; some limited exceptions apply. Players may hold more than one non-FIFA nationality.

No.	Pos.	Nation	Player
1	GK	AUT	Severin Heuberger
2	MF	AUT	Patrick Brugger
3	DF	AUT	Tobias Wechselberger
4	MF	AUT	Fabian Büchele
5	DF	AUT	Manuel Roider
6	DF	AUT	Lucas Kauba
7	MF	AUT	Simon Braun
8	FW	AUT	Christoph Chudoba
9	MF	AUT	Ben Leitenstorfer
10	FW	AUT	Fabian Neumayr
11	MF	AUT	Felix Eliasch (captain)
12	MF	AUT	Andreas Pär
14	MF	AUT	Tobias Feldinger

No.	Pos.	Nation	Player
17	MF	UKR	Yegor Sapozhnikov
18	MF	AUT	Julian Di Ronza
19	DF	AUT	Markus Auer
20	FW	AUT	Michael Aigner
22	MF	AUT	Jakob Kaunz
23	MF	AUT	Lukas Can Hindler
24	FW	AUT	Sebastian Weinbacher
25	DF	AUT	Marlon Sickinger
30	GK	AUT	Elias Pitterka
80	MF	GER	Aaron Volkert
—	GK	AUT	Sebastian Kaiser
—	MF	AUT	Elias Schaurecker

=== Coaching staff ===
As of 9 September 2026

- (Croatia) Tomislav Jonjić Head Coach
- (Austria) Gabriel Zaunseder Assistant Coach
- (Austria) Nikola Gajic Goalkeeper Coach
- (Austria) Alexander Wassung Athletic Coach
- (Austria) Herbert Fellinger Team Liaison
- (Austria) Luggi Dornetzhumer Kit Manager

== League ==
Season	Final place	Level
2004–05	12	Regionalliga West (3)
2005–06	11	Regionalliga West (3)
2006–07	12	Regionalliga West (3)
2007–08	7	Regionalliga West (3)
2008–09	11	Regionalliga West (3)
2009–10	6	Regionalliga West (3)
2010–11	14	Regionalliga West (3)
2011–12	15	Regionalliga West (3)
2012–13	7	Regionalliga West (3)
2013–14	10	Regionalliga West (3)
2014–15	9	Regionalliga West (3)
2015–16	9	Regionalliga West (3)
2016–17	10	Regionalliga West (3)
2017–18	12	Regionalliga West (3)
2018–19	5	Regionalliga West (3)
2019–20	3	Regionalliga Salzburg (3)
2020/21	- No championship due to COVID-19	Regionalliga Salzburg (3)
2021–22	5	Regionalliga Salzburg (3)
2022–23	6	Regionalliga Salzburg (3)
2023–24	2	Salzburger Liga (4)
2024–25	1	Salzburger Liga (4)
2025–26	4	Regionalliga West (3)

== Honours ==
- Austrian Landesliga: 1997, 1999, 2002
- Austrian 2. Landesliga: 1993
- Austrian Regionalliga West: 1997/98, 1999/2000, 2002/03, 2003/04, 2004/05, 2005/06, 2006/07, 2007/08, 2008/09, 2009/10, 2010/11, 2011/12, 2012/2013, 2013/2014, 2014/2015, 2015/16, 2016/17, 2017/18, 2018/19, 2019/20, 2020/21, 2021/22
- Salzburger Liga: 2024–25

== Notable players ==
SV Seekirchen is known for developing young players.

- Robert Ibertsberger (Austria Salzburg, AC Venezia, Sturm Graz, FC Tirol Innsbruck)
- Andreas Ibertsberger (Austria Salzburg, SC Freiburg, TSG 1899 Hoffenheim)
- Herbert Laux (Austria Salzburg, SV Ried, Vorwärts Steyr)
- Manfred Pamminger (Austria Salzburg, SC Austria Lustenau, ASKÖ Pasching)
- Thomas Winklhofer (Austria Salzburg, FC Swarovski Tirol, WSG Swarovski Wattens)
- Heimo Pfeifenberger (Austria Salzburg, Werder Bremen, SK Rapid Wien)
- Markus Scharrer (Austria Salzburg, FC Tirol, LASK Linz)
- Stefan Lainer (FC Red Bull Salzburg, Borussia Mönchengladbach)
