= Austrian Regionalliga West =

- Founded: 1960, re-established 1980 and 2023
- Country: Austria
- Confederation: UEFA
- Number of clubs: 16
- Level on pyramid: Level 2 (1960–1974); Level 3 (1980–present)
- Promotion to: Staatsliga (1960–1965); Nationalliga (1965–1974); 2. Liga (1980–present)
- Relegation to: Regionalliga Tirol; Eliteliga Vorarlberg
- Domestic cup: Austrian Cup
- Current champions: FC Wacker Innsbruck (2025–26)
- Most championships: FC Dornbirn 1913 (6 titles)
- Current: 2026–27

The Austrian Regionalliga West, known in German simply as the Regionalliga West, is a men's football league in Austria. It covers the states of Tyrol and Vorarlberg. The East Tyrol exclave is excluded, as its clubs are registered with the Carinthian association. The league has been staged in three separate spells. From 1960 to 1974 it formed part of the second tier of the Austrian football league system. It returned as a third tier division in 1980 and ran until 2019. It was revived again in 2023.

The league sits below the 2. Liga and above the fourth tier competitions of Tyrol and Vorarlberg. It is one of four parallel divisions at the third level, alongside the Regionalliga East, the Regionalliga North and the Regionalliga South.

Salzburg belonged to the Regionalliga West for the whole of its history until 2026. A reform that took the third tier from three divisions to four moved its clubs into the new Regionalliga North alongside Upper Austria, and the Regionalliga Central was dissolved at the same time. The Regionalliga West was left with eight clubs from Tyrol and eight from Vorarlberg. FC Dornbirn 1913 are the most successful club with six titles.

== Format ==
Sixteen clubs play each other home and away over 30 matchdays, and the club top of the table at the end is champion. The Regionalliga North uses the same format, while the Regionalliga South splits into two state groups in the autumn and decides its title in a spring play-off.

No champion is promoted automatically. The four Regionalliga winners contest two-legged ties for two places in the 2. Liga, and the pairings are drawn each year before the season starts. The Regionalliga West champion was drawn against the Regionalliga North champion for 2026–27. A club must hold a 2. Liga licence before it can go up.

== History ==
=== Second tier (1960–1974) ===
The Regionalliga West was introduced for the 1960–61 season, a year after the Regionalliga East and the Regionalliga Central. It replaced the Tauernliga Nord for clubs from Salzburg and the Arlbergliga for clubs from Tyrol and Vorarlberg. Salzburger AK 1914 took the first title. The Austrian Regionalligen operated as the second tier of the national pyramid until the end of the 1973–74 season, with the champions promoted directly to the top flight.

A restructuring in 1974–75 created ten-club First and Second Bundesligen and dissolved the Regionalliga West and the Regionalliga Central. Promotion to the second Bundesliga was thereafter decided by play-offs between the Landesliga champions of Salzburg, Tyrol, Vorarlberg and the central provinces, while the Regionalliga East champion kept direct promotion. In 1977–78 Salzburg and Tyrol introduced the Alpenliga as an intermediate third tier above their Landesligen. Vorarlberg did not take part, and from 1977–78 its Landesliga champion met the Alpenliga winner in a play-off.

=== Third tier (1980–2019) ===
The Regionalliga West was reinstated in 1980–81, this time as a third tier competition and this time including Vorarlberg. It replaced the Alpenliga. The Regionalliga East, by contrast, was not contested from 1980–81 to 1984–85 and resumed only in 1985–86, and the Regionalliga Central did not reappear until 1994–95. Up to and including 1995–96 the West and East champions had direct promotion to the second tier.

Between 1996–97 and 2003–04 the three Regionalliga champions contested promotion play-offs with the second-last club of the First League for two places. Direct promotion returned with the planned expansion of the First League to twelve clubs from 2005–06, although licensing problems delayed the full effect by a season. Play-offs with the ninth-placed First League side came back in 2009–10, when the division was cut to ten clubs. From 2014–15 the system provided one direct promotion place on a rotating basis and a play-off for the second.

=== Eliteliga (2019–2023) ===
Ahead of the 2019–20 season the Tyrol and Vorarlberg associations abandoned the joint Westliga, chiefly to reduce travel costs, and Salzburg had to follow. Three autumn competitions took its place, the Regionalliga Salzburg, the Regionalliga Tirol and the Eliteliga Vorarlberg, each with ten clubs. The two best teams from each fed a spring Eliteliga play-off for a place in the 2. Liga.

The play-off was not held in 2019–20 and the 2020–21 season was abandoned, both because of the COVID-19 pandemic. Only two editions were completed.

=== Return and reform ===
In February 2022 the regional associations and the Austrian Football Association (ÖFB) confirmed that the traditional Regionalliga West would be reinstated from 2023–24, reuniting Salzburg, Tyrol and Vorarlberg.

That arrangement lasted three seasons. A working group set up by the ÖFB in 2024 recommended taking the third tier from three divisions to four, and the reform came into force in 2026–27. Salzburg left the Regionalliga West to join Upper Austria in the new Regionalliga North, the Regionalliga Central was dissolved, and its Styrian and Carinthian clubs formed the new Regionalliga South. The Regionalliga West was left with eight clubs from Tyrol and eight from Vorarlberg.

== Champions ==
=== Second tier champions (1960–1974) ===
Regionalliga West champions 1960–61 to 1973–74
Club	Titles	Winning seasons
Austria Salzburg (Note: The club now known as FC Red Bull Salzburg. It is a separate club from SV Austria Salzburg, founded in 2005, which appears in the third tier table below.)	3	1961–62, 1964–65, 1966–67
FC Dornbirn 1913	3	1962–63, 1968–69, 1973–74
Schwarz-Weiß Bregenz	3	1965–66, 1969–70, 1971–72
Salzburger AK 1914	1	1960–61
FC Wacker Innsbruck	1	1963–64
SV Wattens	1	1967–68
SK Bischofshofen	1	1970–71
FC Rätia Bludenz	1	1972–73

=== Third tier champions (1980–present) ===
The league was not staged between 1974 and 1980, or between 2019 and 2023.

Regionalliga West champions 1980–81 to 2025–26
Club	Titles	Winning seasons
Wattens (Note: Competing as WSG Swarovski Wattens and later as WSG Wattens.)	5	1988–89, 1994–95, 1998–99, 2011–12, 2015–16
Kufstein (Note: Competing as SC Kufstein in 1982–83 and 1985–86 and as FC Kufstein thereafter.)	4	1982–83, 1985–86, 1992–93, 2004–05
SV Austria Salzburg	4	2013–14, 2014–15, 2023–24, 2024–25
SCR Altach	3	1990–91, 1996–97, 2003–04
FC Lustenau 07	3	1999–2000, 2000–01, 2005–06
FC Dornbirn 1913	3	1987–88, 2008–09, 2018–19
USV Salzburg	2	1983–84, 1986–87
SV Grödig	2	2007–08, 2009–10
Red Bull Salzburg II	2	2006–07, 2010–11
USK Anif	2	2016–17, 2017–18
ASK Salzburg	1	1980–81
IG Bregenz/Dornbirn	1	1981–82
IG Bregenz/Dornbirn II	1	1984–85
FC Salzburg	1	1989–90
ASVÖ FC Puch	1	1991–92
SC Austria Lustenau	1	1993–94
Schwarz-Weiß Bregenz	1	1995–96
SV Wörgl	1	1997–98
FC Hard	1	2001–02
WSG Wattens/Wacker Tirol (Note: A joint team formed by WSG Wattens and the newly founded FC Wacker Tirol.)	1	2002–03
FC Liefering	1	2012–13
FC Wacker Innsbruck	1	2025–26

=== Eliteliga play-off winners (2019–20 to 2022–23) ===
No Regionalliga West was staged in these seasons. The Eliteliga play-off decided the western promotion place instead, and its winners are counted as Regionalliga West champions by some sources.

Season	Winners
2019–20	Play-off not held
2020–21	Abandoned
2021–22	SC Schwaz
2022–23	Schwarz-Weiß Bregenz

== See also ==
- Austrian Regionalliga
- Austrian football league system
