= FC Kufstein =

Austrian football club, based in Kufstein

- Full name: Fußballclub Kufstein
- Founded: 1919; 107 years ago
- Ground: Kufstein Arena
- Capacity: 4,500
- Chairman: Simon Einwaller
- Manager: Ronald Gërçaliu
- League: Regionalliga West
- 2025–26: Regionalliga West, 16th of 17
Home colours	Away colours

Fußballclub Kufstein is an association football club based in the town of Kufstein, Tyrol, Austria, that competes in Regionalliga West, one of the third tiers of the Austrian football league system. Founded in 1987, it is affiliated to the Tirol Football Association. The team plays its home matches at Kufstein Arena, where it has been based since its foundation.

== History ==
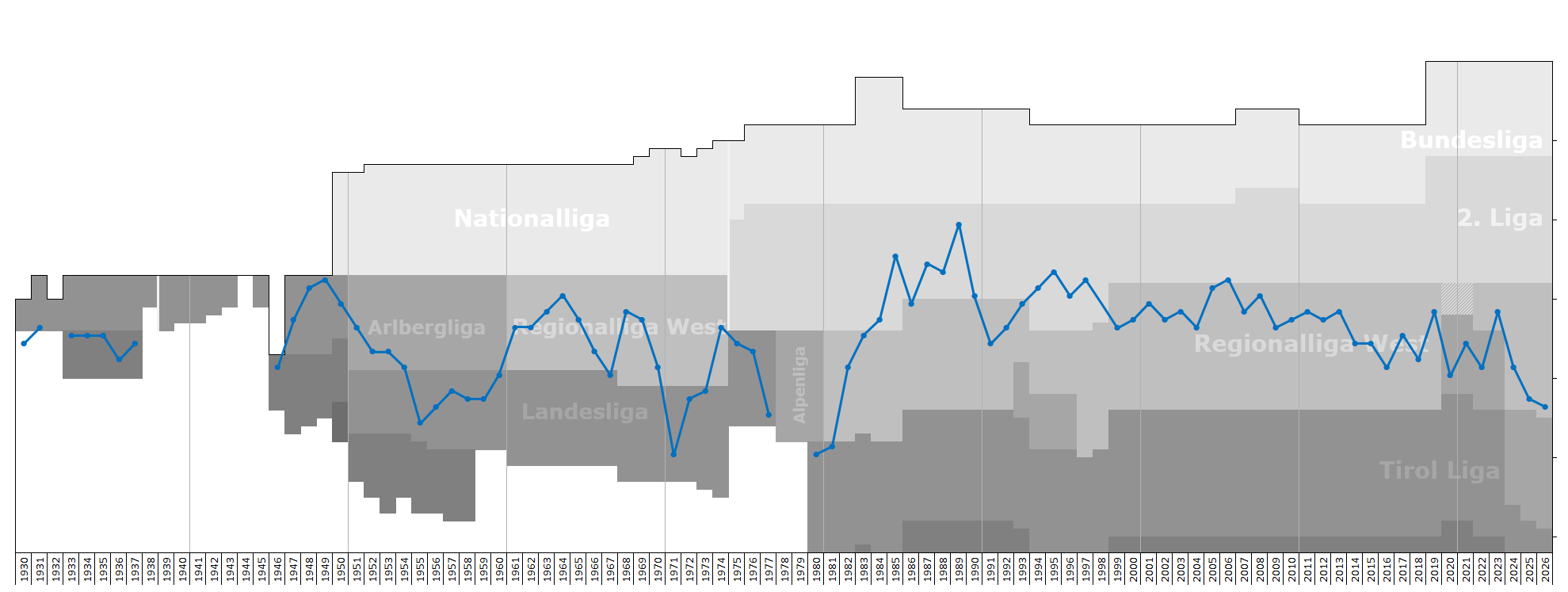
Historical chart of Kufstein league performance

The club was formed in 1919, around twenty years after football was popularised in Austria. The club was known as SV Kufstein up until World War II, and from 1946 to 1987 as SC Kufstein. The current name was adopted in 1987 following a merger with local amateur club ESV Kufstein. Since 1987, the club has played in the Austrian Regional League West and the Austrian Football First League.

== Stadium ==
FC Kufstein play their home matches in Kufstein Arena, which is close to the centre of the town. The stadium was opened in 1925 and substantially redeveloped in 1999. The current capacity is 4500. The team's average home attendance for the 2010–11 season was 265. The stadium has hosted international matches, including 2010 friendlies between Belarus and South Korea and Poland and Serbia.

== Current squad ==
As of 1 October 2024

Note: Flags indicate national team as defined under FIFA eligibility rules; some limited exceptions apply. Players may hold more than one non-FIFA nationality.

No.	Pos.	Nation	Player
2	MF	AUT	David Stoppacher
3	DF	AUT	Sahin Karayün
4	DF	AUT	Thomas Herwig
6	MF	TUR	Kemal Kılıç
7	DF	AUT	Stefan Schlichenmaier
8	MF	AUT	Daniel Egger
9	FW	AUT	Stefan Lauf
10	MF	CRO	Sandro Gavrić
11	FW	AUT	Stefan Hofmann
12	DF	AUT	Marlon Beslic
14	MF	AUT	Mathias Madersbacher

No.	Pos.	Nation	Player
15	MF	AUT	Engincan Gündogdu
16	DF	AUT	Alexander Schwab
17	FW	GER	Erwin Ndombe
18	MF	ARG	Ignacio Jaúregui
19	MF	AUT	Robert Martić
20	DF	AUT	Ronald Gërçaliu
21	MF	AUT	Bastian Pichler
22	DF	CRO	Josip Steko
23	MF	ALB	Deni Lamce
31	GK	GER	Mario Stockenreiter
99	GK	AUT	Patrick Enzi

== Achievements ==
- Austrian Third Division (West):
  - Winners (4): 1983, 1986, 1993, 2005
- Tyrol State League:
  - Winners (3): 1949, 1973, 1981

== See also ==
- Football in Austria
- Austrian Regional League West
