= Salzburger Liga =

- Founded: 2010
- Country: Austria
- Confederation: Austrian Football Association
- Number of clubs: 16
- Level on pyramid: 4
- Promotion to: Austrian Regional League West
- Relegation to: 1. Landesliga
- Current champions: Union Henndorf (2022–23)

The Salzburger Liga, is since the 2010–11 season, the top division in Salzburg football and the fourth-highest division in Austria. The association responsible for the league is the Salzburg Football Association.

In general, per season one team moves up into the Austrian Regional League West, and two teams moves down to the 1. Landesliga. Depending on the number of clubs from Salzburg descending from the Regional League West the number of teams moving up from the Salzburger Liga can vary.

== History ==
In the 1920/21 season, a joint championship was still held with Upper Austria involving five clubs. The winner of this championship was SK Vorwärts Steyr, followed by Welser SC. Salzburger SK finished third, becoming the highest-ranking team from Salzburg. In the following season, the Salzburg Football Association, founded on April 15, 1921, organized its own championship with six teams: the reigning champion 1. Salzburger SK 1919, Salzburger AK 1914, Deutscher SV Salzburg, SK Oberndorf, Itzlinger SK, and SK Neumarkt. In the subsequent years, fewer teams participated for various reasons. The 1. Salzburger SK 1919 repeated their championship victory, and then Salzburger AK 1914 won the remaining championships until 1938. In the 1932/33 season, only four teams played in the 1st division, prompting a decision to establish a joint league with Upper Austria from 1933 to 1935, featuring 10 or 11 teams. Among them, only Salzburger AK 1914, SV Austria Salzburg, and 1. Salzburger SK 1919 represented Salzburg. Starting from 1935, they went their separate ways, reintroducing the 1st division with four to five teams as the top league in Salzburg.

== 2023-24 member clubs ==
- UFC Altenmarkt
- SV Anthering
- SC Bad Hofgastein
- FC Bergheim
- USV 1960 Berndorf
- UFC SV Hallwang
- FC Kaprun
- SC Mühlbach im Pinzgau
- TSV Neumarkt
- SC Pfarrwerfen
- ASV Salzburg
- ATSV Salzburg
- SV Schwarzach
- SC Tamsweg
Location of teams in 2023–24 Salzburger Liga
