= SAK Klagenfurt =

SAK Celovec/Klagenfurt
- Full name: Slovenski Atletski Klub Celovec/Klagenfurt
- Founded: 18 April 1970; 56 years ago
- Ground: SAK Sportpark Welzenegg
- Capacity: 2,000
- Chairman: Marko Wieser
- Manager: Richard Huber
- League: Kärntner Liga
- Website: https://www.sak.at/

SAK Celovec/Klagenfurt is an Austrian football club based in Klagenfurt, Carinthia, currently playing in the fourth tier Kärntner Liga. It was founded in 1970 by members of the Federal Gymnasium for Slovenes.

After the re-introduction of the Regional League Central, SAK won the 1995 championship and was promoted to the First League. Nevertheless, the team was again relegated one year later to the Regional League, where they have played until 2001, from 2002 until 2003 and from 2005 until 2015. From 2001 until 2002 und from 2003 until 2005 the team played in the "Kaerntner Landesliga" ("Kaerntner Liga").
