= Football in Austria =

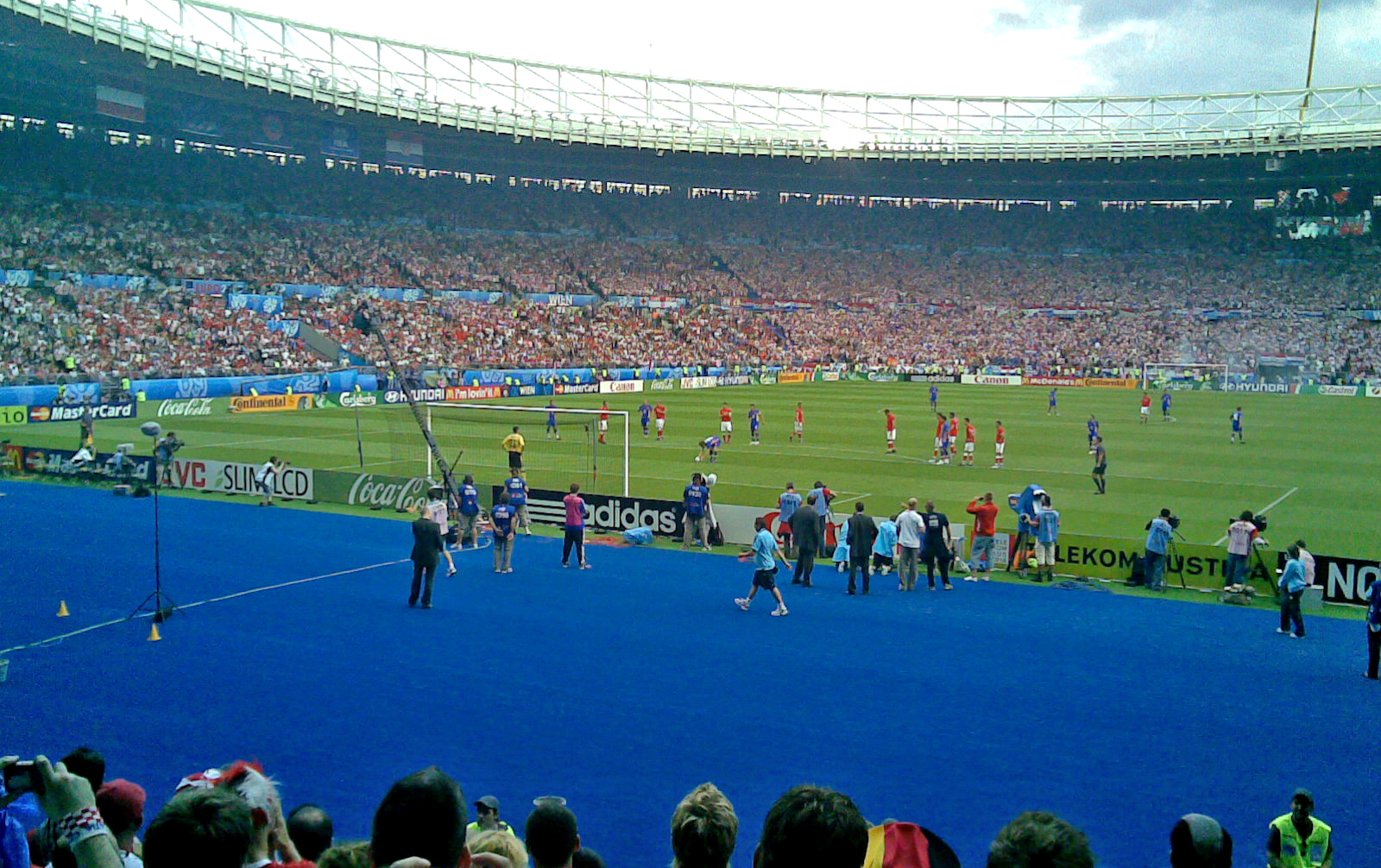
- Austria against Croatia at the Ernst-Happel-Stadion in Vienna during Euro 2008, the first major tournament Austria hosted
- Country: Austria
- Governing body: ÖFB
- National team: Austria national football team
- First played: 1904; 122 years ago

National competitions
- FIFA World Cup; UEFA European Championship; UEFA Nations League

Club competitions
- List Bundesliga ÖFB Frauen Bundesliga; 2. Liga Cups Austrian Cup ÖFB Frauen Cup

International competitions
- FIFA Club World Cup; FIFA Intercontinental Cup; UEFA Champions League; UEFA Women's Champions League; UEFA Europa League; UEFA Conference League; UEFA Super Cup

Football is the most popular sport in Austria. The Austrian Football Association (German: Österreichischer Fußball-Bund or ÖFB) was founded on 18 March 1904, joined FIFA in 1905 and was a founder member of UEFA in 1954.

Austria's national team was among the strongest in Europe in the early 1930s, when the side known as the Wunderteam (German: Wonder Team) finished fourth at the 1934 FIFA World Cup and took the silver medal at the 1936 Summer Olympics. Its best result remains third place at the 1954 FIFA World Cup. Austria has since reached eight World Cup finals tournaments and four UEFA European Championships.

The team qualified for the 2026 FIFA World Cup by winning its European qualifying group, ending an absence of 28 years, and reached the round of 32 before losing to the eventual champions Spain. That was its first appearance in a knockout round since 1982. At the European Championship, Austria appeared as co-hosts with Switzerland in 2008 and then qualified in 2016, 2020 and 2024, reaching the round of 16 in the last two.

At the 1978 FIFA World Cup Austria won its first round group ahead of Brazil but lost its opening two second round matches. In the last of them, against West Germany, it produced the win remembered as the Miracle of Córdoba, beating a German national side for the first time in 47 years and eliminating the holders of the previous tournament's runners-up place.

== History ==
Football reached Austria in the late nineteenth century, and from 1900 a cup competition was played in Vienna under the name Neues Wiener Tagblatt-Pokal. The country's first league followed in 1911, the 1. Klasse, organised by the football federation of Lower Austria. It became a professional competition in 1924 and was renamed the I. Liga. An amateur championship was introduced in 1929, from which the professional clubs of Vienna were excluded, and was won by Grazer AK.

Under coach Hugo Meisl and built around Matthias Sindelar, the national team of the early 1930s became known as the Wunderteam. On 16 May 1931 it became the first team from continental Europe to beat Scotland, and it went on to win the Central European International Cup in 1932.

The annexation of Austria by Nazi Germany in 1938 brought the abolition of professionalism in May of that year. Jewish clubs, among them Hakoah Vienna, were dissolved, and clubs with Jewish officials and members, Austria Wien among them, were forced to restructure. The Austrian top division, renamed the Nationalliga in 1937–38, was absorbed into the competition structure of the National Socialist League of the Reich for Physical Exercise (German: Nationalsozialistischer Reichsbund für Leibesübungen). The Gauliga Ostmark covered most of the country, while Tyrol and Vorarlberg were attached to the Bavarian structure, and its champion entered the German championship.

After the Second World War the Vienna league was reactivated as the top division for three seasons. A dispute between the amateur and professional wings of the game then led the leading clubs to break with the Vienna association and form their own competition, the Österreichische Fußball-Staatsliga, which was admitted to the ÖFB in July 1949 as its tenth member alongside the nine state associations. The resulting Staatsliga A was the first genuinely national league, and a second division, the Staatsliga B, followed a year later and ran until 1959.

On 21 April 1974 the Bundesliga was introduced as the top division, and the Nationalliga became the second tier. That division has since been renamed several times and has been the 2. Liga since 2018. The Bundesliga has been run since 1 December 1991 by the Österreichische Fußball-Bundesliga, a legally separate association within the ÖFB, while the ÖFB itself organises the Austrian Cup and the national teams.

First Vienna is the oldest club in the country and has won six Austrian league titles and the German cup in 1943. Rapid Wien is the most successful, with 32 league titles, the German championship of 1941 and two runners-up finishes in the UEFA Cup Winners' Cup. Austria Wien also reached a Cup Winners' Cup final, in 1978, and Austria Salzburg, now Red Bull Salzburg, were beaten finalists in the 1994 UEFA Cup.

== National team ==
The men's national team is controlled by the ÖFB. It played its first official match on 12 October 1902 in Vienna, beating Hungary 5–0 in the first international contested between two continental European sides.

Austria has appeared at eight World Cup finals tournaments and four European Championships, the first of the latter as co-host in 2008. Its best results are third place at the 1954 World Cup in Switzerland, fourth in 1934 in Italy and the Olympic silver medal of 1936 in Berlin. The Wunderteam of the 1930s, which included Sindelar, the forward nicknamed the "Mozart of football", alongside Josef Bican and Johann Horvath, went 14 matches unbeaten between April 1931 and December 1932 and won the Central European International Cup in that period.

Under Ralf Rangnick, appointed in 2022, the team won its 2026 World Cup qualifying group with six wins from eight matches and a goal difference of 22–4, securing its place with a 1–1 draw against Bosnia and Herzegovina on 18 November 2025. At the tournament it finished second in a group containing Argentina, Algeria and Jordan, then lost 3–0 to Spain in the round of 32.

Marko Arnautović holds both principal records. He passed Andreas Herzog's 103 appearances in September 2022 and overtook Toni Polster's 44 goals on 9 October 2025, scoring four in a 10–0 win over San Marino that was also Austria's largest ever victory, beating a 9–0 win over Malta in 1977. He extended both marks at the 2026 World Cup, where he also became the oldest player to represent Austria at the tournament, at 37 years and 59 days.

== Competitions ==
=== League system ===
The Bundesliga is the highest national club competition in Austria and is contested by 12 teams. The second tier is the 2. Liga, with 16 teams. The third tier consists of four parallel divisions known as the Regionalliga, each covering the area of one or more state associations: the East comprises clubs from Vienna, Lower Austria and Burgenland; the North clubs from Upper Austria and Salzburg; the South clubs from Styria, Carinthia and East Tyrol; and the West clubs from Tyrol, excluding East Tyrol, and Vorarlberg. This structure replaced a three-division third tier in 2026–27.

Winning a Regionalliga no longer brings automatic promotion. Since 2026–27 the best eligible club in each of the four divisions enters a promotion play-off, contested as two two-legged ties whose pairings are drawn before the season. The two winners go up to the 2. Liga. Should a further place in the 2. Liga fall vacant, the losing club from the first tie drawn is promoted as well. Because only two clubs now come up, only two are relegated from the 2. Liga, where previously there were three. The ÖFB introduced the change after repeated seasons in which clubs that had qualified on the pitch declined to apply for a second tier licence.

The fourth tier consists of nine divisions, one for each state association, and the champion of each is promoted to the Regionalliga covering its area. Seven are named after the state or carry the Landesliga title. The other two, in Tyrol and Vorarlberg, kept the names they were given in 2019 when the Regionalliga West was broken up into state competitions, and dropped to the fourth tier when it was restored in 2023–24. Below the fourth tier the structure is set by each state association and the number of levels differs from state to state. In Vienna, unofficial tiers exist beneath the official ones. They are not organised by the ÖFB, but in theory their champions can be promoted into the official structure.

Level	Division								
I	Bundesliga; 12 clubs								
	↓↑ 1 club								
II	2. Liga; (Second League); 16 clubs								
	↓ 2 clubs								
	↑ 2 clubs via play-off between the four Regionalliga representatives								
III	Regionalliga Ost (Regional League East); 16 clubs			Regionalliga Nord (Regional League North); 15 clubs		Regionalliga Süd (Regional League South); 16 clubs		Regionalliga West (Regional League West); 16 clubs	
	↓ number varies								
	↑ 1 club	↑ 1 club	↑ 1 club	↑ 1 club	↑ 1 club	↑ 1 club	↑ 1 club	↑ 1 club	↑ 1 club
IV	Landesliga Burgenland	1. Landesliga	Wiener Stadtliga	OÖ Liga	Salzburger Liga	Landesliga Steiermark	Kärntner Liga	Regionalliga Tirol	Eliteliga Vorarlberg
	↓↑ Number of clubs may vary								
V+	Burgenland state leagues	Lower Austria state leagues	Vienna city leagues	Upper Austria state leagues	Salzburg state leagues	Styria state leagues	Carinthia state leagues	Tyrol state leagues	Vorarlberg state leagues

== Women's football ==
=== Domestic football ===
Until 1982 the championship was organized by Wiener Fußball-Verband. After that date he went to the organization of the National Federation. The championship has a national character for the first two divisions, ÖFB-Frauenliga and 2. Frauenliga, which in turn is divided into three groups: Mitte / West (composed of 10 teams), Ost (11) and Süd (7). The first of each group runs the promotions for the promotion, retires the last ranked. Regional tournaments are organized, organized by the individual Federation of Land, from 3rd to 5th level.

Until 2004, the winner contested the Austrian Supercup against the winners of the Austrian Cup.

In the 2010-2011 season, 334 teams are registered.

=== National team ===
The Austrian women's national team debuted on 9 July 1970 before the selection of Mexico in a match won by the Mexicans by 9-0 in Italy. The Austrian women's team has not yet participated in a the FIFA Women's World Cup but reached the semi-finals of the European Championship in 2017.

== Largest football stadiums in Austria ==
Stadiums with a capacity of 30,000 or higher are included.

#	Photo	Stadium	Capacity	Club	City	Notes
1		Ernst Happel Stadion	50,865	Austria national team, FK Austria Wien	Vienna	UEFA Category 4 stadium
2		28 Black Arena	32,000	SK Austria Klagenfurt	Klagenfurt	
3		Red Bull Arena	31,895	Red Bull Salzburg	Salzburg	

== Attendances ==
The average attendance per top-flight football league season and the club with the highest average attendance:

Season	League average	Best club	Best club average
2023–24	8,144	SK Rapid	18,859
2022–23	7,559	SK Rapid	18,844
2021–22	—	—	—
2020–21	—	—	—
2019–20	6,322	SK Rapid	18,667
2018–19	6,373	SK Rapid	16,483
2017–18	6,394	SK Rapid	18,791
2016–17	7,037	SK Rapid	21,033
2015–16	6,274	SK Rapid	16,860
2014–15	6,580	SK Rapid	16,770
2013–14	6,169	SK Rapid	13,792
2012–13	6,802	SK Rapid	14,221
2011–12	7,075	SK Rapid	15,832
2010–11	7,953	SK Rapid	15,825
2009–10	7,873	SK Rapid	15,343
2008–09	9,013	SK Rapid	15,777
2007–08	9,338	SK Rapid	14,336
2006–07	8,022	Salzburg	15,109
2005–06	7,664	Salzburg	13,683
2004–05	6,757	SK Rapid	14,718
2003–04	7,216	SK Rapid	12,324
2002–03	5,285	Salzburg	7,514
2001–02	6,043	Innsbruck	10,157
2000–01	6,480	Innsbruck	13,131
1999–2000	7,702	Innsbruck	11,404
1998–99	6,864	Sturm Graz	11,031
1997–98	8,105	Sturm Graz	14,247
1996–97	6,407	Salzburg	12,000
1995–96	6,628	SK Rapid	12,306
1994–95	6,532	Salzburg	12,889
1993–94	4,267	Salzburg	10,250
1992–93	4,244	Salzburg	10,306
1991–92	5,094	Salzburg	13,083
1990–91	4,359	Salzburg	9,528
1989–90	4,845	Innsbruck	10,067
1988–89	4,377	Innsbruck	10,956
1987–88	4,522	Innsbruck	7,150
1986–87	4,537	Innsbruck	9,072
1985–86	4,226	Innsbruck	8,928
1984–85	3,510	Leoben	5,800
1983–84	4,049	SK Rapid	8,214
1982–83	4,230	SK Rapid	7,467
1981–82	5,644	SK Rapid	8,711
1980–81	6,256	SK Rapid	9,794
1979–80	6,437	LASK	6,437
1978–79	5,780	BW Linz	7,526
1977–78	4,353	Sturm Graz	6,250
1976–77	4,759	Innsbruck	6,889
1975–76	5,451	Austria Wien	7,389
1974–75	5,793	Innsbruck	8,206
1973–74	5,225	Innsbruck	8,531
1972–73	5,254	Innsbruck	8,667
1971–72	6,394	Innsbruck	10,821
1970–71	5,473	Innsbruck	8,767
1969–70	5,113	Sturm Graz	8,067

== Most successful clubs overall ==
As of 17 May 2026

Club	Domestic Titles						International Titles				Overall titles
Club	Austrian Football Bundesliga	Gauliga	Austrian Cup	Tschammer-Pokal	Austrian Supercup	Total	Challenge Cup	Mitropa Cup	Intertoto Cup	Total	Overall titles
Austria Wien	24	-	27	-	6	57	-	2	-	2	59
Rapid Wien	32	1	14	1	4	52	-	2	-	2	54
Red Bull Salzburg	17	-	9	-	3	29	-	-	-	-	29
Wacker Innsbruck	10	-	7	-	-	17	-	2	-	2	19
Admira Wacker	9	-	6	-	1	16	-	-	-	-	16
Sturm Graz	5	-	7	-	3	15	-	-	-	-	15
First Vienna	6	-	3	1	-	10	2	1	-	3	13
Wiener AC	1	-	3	-	-	4	3	-	-	3	7
Grazer AK	1	-	4	-	2	7	-	-	-	-	7
Wiener SC	3	-	1	-	-	4	2	-	-	2	6
LASK	2	-	2	-	-	4	-	-	-	-	4
Vienna CFC	-	-	-	-	-	0	2	-	-	2	2
Stahl Linz	1	-	-	-	-	1	-	-	1	1	2
Wiener AF	1	-	1	-	-	2	-	-	-	-	2
SV Ried	-	-	2	-	-	2	-	-	-	-	2
FC Kärnten	-	-	1	-	1	2	-	-	-	-	2
SC Eisenstadt	-	-	-	-	-	0	-	1	-	-	1
Floridsdorfer AC	1	-	-	-	-	1	-	-	-	-	1
Hakoah Vienna	1	-	-	-	-	1	-	-	-	-	1
FC Juniors OÖ	-	-	1	-	-	1	-	-	-	-	1
Kremser SC	-	-	1	-	-	1	-	-	-	-	1
SV Horn	-	-	1	-	-	1	-	-	-	-	1
SV Stockerau	-	-	1	-	-	1	-	-	-	-	1
Wolfsberger AC	-	-	1	-	-	1	-	-	-	-	1

== See also ==
- Austria national football team
- Austrian Bundesliga
- List of football stadiums in Austria
