= 2024–25 Austrian Landesliga =

Austrian Landesliga
- Season: 2024–25

The 2024–25 Austrian Landesliga is the 66th season of the Austrian fourth-tier football league.

The Landesliga is split into nine conferences, one for each Austrian states:

- Burgenland: Landesliga Burgenland
- Lower Austria: 1. Niederösterreichische Landesliga
- Vienna: Wiener Stadtliga

The champions of each conference are promoted to the Regional League East.

- Carinthia and East Tyrol: Kärntner Liga
- Upper Austria: OÖ Liga
- Styria: Landesliga Steiermark

The champions of each conference are promoted to the Regional League Central.

- Salzburg: Salzburger Liga
- Tyrol (without East Tyrol): Tiroler Liga
- Vorarlberg: Vorarlbergliga

The champions of each conference are promoted to the Regional League West.

== Burgenland ==
The league is made up of sixteen teams playing one home and one away match against each other. A season therefore comprises 30 match days.

The end of the season the champion is entitled to promotion into the third-class Austrian Regional League East. The number of teams that descend into the fifth-class divisions 2. Liga Nord, 2. Liga Mitte and 2. Liga Süd varies depending on the number of relegated Burgenland teams in the Regional League East. From 2. Liga Nord, 2. Liga Mitte and 2. Liga Süd respectively, one club advances into the Burgenland Landesliga.

Pos	Team	Pld	W	D	L	GF	GA	GD	Pts	Promotion or relegation
1	Parndorf	24	17	6	1	54	16	+38	57	Promotion to 2025–26 Austrian Regionalliga
2	Mattersburg	24	15	3	6	48	27	+21	48	
3	Deutschkreutz	24	13	7	4	38	21	+17	46	
4	Leithaprodersdorf	24	13	4	7	43	30	+13	43	
5	St Margarethen im Burgenland	24	11	4	9	37	30	+7	37	
6	Bad Sauerbrunn	24	8	12	4	41	29	+12	36	
7	Jennersdorf	24	9	8	7	34	32	+2	35	
8	Horitschon-Unterpetersdorf	24	10	4	10	43	46	−3	34	
9	Halbturn	24	9	6	9	34	36	−2	33	
10	Kohfidisch	24	9	6	9	42	45	−3	33	
11	Pama	24	8	4	12	32	36	−4	28	Possible relegation to 2025–26 Austrian 2. Landesliga
12	Edelserpentin	24	8	4	12	31	45	−14	28	Possible relegation to 2025–26 Austrian 2. Landesliga
13	Kligenbach	24	7	4	13	19	33	−14	25	Possible relegation to 2025–26 Austrian 2. Landesliga
14	Draßburg	24	5	5	14	21	35	−14	20	Possible relegation to 2025–26 Austrian 2. Landesliga
15	Schattendorf	24	4	3	17	25	49	−24	15	Relegation to 2025–26 Austrian 2. Landesliga
16	Pinkafeld	24	3	6	15	20	52	−32	15	Relegation to 2025–26 Austrian 2. Landesliga

Updated to match(es) played on 27 April 2025. Source: Flashscore
Rules for classification: 1) Points; 2) Less matches awarded against; 3) Goal difference; 4) Goals scored; 5) Matches won; 6) Away matches won; 7) Head-to-head points; 8) Head-to-head goal difference; 9) Head-to-head goals scored.

== Niederösterreich ==
In the 1. Niederösterreichische Landesliga, a total of 16 football clubs from Lower Austria participate.

The champion rises directly into the third-highest division, the Regional League East. In addition to the champion of the 1. Niederösterreichische Landesliga, the champions of the Burgenland national league and Wiener Stadtliga, also move up. Under the 1. Niederösterreichische Landesliga are the 2. Landesliga Ost and 2. Landesliga West.

Pos	Team	Pld	W	D	L	GF	GA	GD	Pts	Promotion or relegation
1	Retz	24	17	3	4	56	20	+36	54	Promotion to 2025–26 Austrian Regionalliga
2	Wiener Neustadt	24	16	6	2	57	25	+32	54	
3	Scheiblingkirchen-Warth	23	16	5	2	32	12	+20	53	
4	Ybbs	24	11	9	4	51	30	+21	42	
5	Admira Wacker Mödling II	24	11	7	6	40	34	+6	40	
6	Korneuburg	24	11	5	8	45	41	+4	38	
7	Sankt Peter in der Au	24	9	5	10	37	35	+2	32	
8	Langenrohr	24	10	2	12	45	50	−5	32	
9	Zwettl	24	8	7	9	38	40	−2	31	
10	Kilb	23	9	4	10	34	33	+1	31	
11	Stockerau	24	8	5	11	37	42	−5	29	
12	Ardagger / Viehdorf	24	7	5	12	25	38	−13	26	Possible relegation to 2025–26 Austrian Landesliga
13	St. Pölten II	24	5	9	10	36	46	−10	24	Possible relegation to 2025–26 Austrian Landesliga
14	Schrems	24	6	3	15	30	53	−23	21	Possible relegation to 2025–26 Austrian Landesliga
15	Ortmann	24	3	7	14	22	43	−21	16	Possible relegation to 2025–26 Austrian Landesliga
16	Rohrbach	24	1	4	19	19	62	−43	7	Relegation to 2025–26 Austrian 2. Landesliga

Updated to match(es) played on 27 April 2025. Source: Soccerway
Rules for classification: 1) Points; 2) Less matches awarded against; 3) Goal difference; 4) Goals scored; 5) Matches won; 6) Away matches won; 7) Head-to-head points; 8) Head-to-head goal difference; 9) Head-to-head goals scored.

== Wiener Stadtliga ==
The league is made up of sixteen teams playing one home and one away match against each other. A season therefore comprises 30 match days.

The end of the season the champion is entitled to promotion into the third-class Austrian Regional League East. The number of teams that descend into the fifth-class divisions 2. Landesliga varies depending on the number of relegated Vienna teams in the Regional League East. One club from the 2. Landesliga advances into the Wiener Stadtliga.

Pos	Team	Pld	W	D	L	GF	GA	GD	Pts	Promotion or relegation
1	SV Donau	29	18	6	5	61	29	+32	60	Promotion to 2025–26 Austrian Regionalliga
2	First Vienna II	29	17	7	5	68	34	+34	58	
3	Dinamo Helfort	29	16	5	8	47	35	+12	53	
4	Brigittenau	29	13	9	7	49	34	+15	48	
5	SV Wienerberg	29	13	8	8	51	33	+18	47	
6	Stadlau	29	12	9	8	44	34	+10	45	
7	Red Star Penzing	29	13	6	10	40	34	+6	45	
8	Gerasdorf Stammersdorf	29	12	6	11	31	41	−10	42	
9	Austria XIII	29	12	5	12	53	49	+4	41	
10	Schwechat	29	10	9	10	43	45	−2	39	
11	LAC-Inter	29	9	9	11	44	52	−8	36	
12	1980 Wien (Z)	29	7	7	15	33	50	−17	28	Possible relegation to 2025–26 Austrian 2. Landesliga
13	Simmeringer SC (Z)	29	7	6	16	40	54	−14	27	Possible relegation to 2025–26 Austrian 2. Landesliga
14	Hellas Kagran (Z)	29	7	6	16	36	54	−18	27	Possible relegation to 2025–26 Austrian 2. Landesliga
15	Slovan HAC (Z)	29	5	8	16	38	64	−26	23	Possible relegation to 2025–26 Austrian 2. Landesliga
16	Mannswörth (Z)	29	5	6	18	21	57	−36	21	Relegation to 2025–26 Austrian 2. Landesliga

Updated to match(es) played on 9 June 2025. Source: Soccerway
Rules for classification: 1) Points; 2) Less matches awarded against; 3) Goal difference; 4) Goals scored; 5) Matches won; 6) Away matches won; 7) Head-to-head points; 8) Head-to-head goal difference; 9) Head-to-head goals scored.
(Z) Can only reach possible relegation at best

== Kärnten ==
The Kärnten League is organized as a league system competition in which, since 2003/04, in principle 16 teams participate (this season 15 teams). The games are played in 28 championship rounds, each divided into a home and away round. The games and venues are drawn at the beginning of the season. The champions acquired the title Kärnter Landesmeister and are given the right to a promotion into the Austrian Regional League Central.

Pos	Team	Pld	W	D	L	GF	GA	GD	Pts	Promotion or relegation
1	Velden	20	14	4	2	49	17	+32	46	Promotion to 2025–26 Austrian Regionalliga
2	Austria Klagenfurt II	21	10	6	5	40	20	+20	36	
3	Wolfsberg	20	11	3	6	45	36	+9	36	
4	Völkermarkt	21	10	4	7	35	29	+6	34	
5	Lendorf	21	10	4	7	39	34	+5	34	
6	Dellach/Gail	21	9	6	6	47	36	+11	33	
7	Spittal/Drau	20	10	3	7	41	37	+4	33	
8	St. Veit	20	8	2	10	32	34	−2	26	
9	Klagenfurt	21	6	8	7	24	28	−4	26	
10	KAC 1909	20	7	4	9	23	26	−3	25	
11	Bleiburg	21	6	3	12	19	34	−15	21	
12	Köttmannsdorf	21	5	5	11	23	42	−19	20	
13	Ferlach	20	5	4	11	20	39	−19	19	
14	St. Jakob im Rosental	20	4	7	9	28	38	−10	19	Relegation to 2025–26 Austrian 2. Landesliga
15	Donau Klagenfurt	21	3	9	9	16	33	−17	18	Relegation to 2025–26 Austrian 2. Landesliga

Updated to match(es) played on 20 April 2025. Source: Soccerway
Rules for classification: 1) Points; 2) Less matches awarded against; 3) Goal difference; 4) Goals scored; 5) Matches won; 6) Away matches won; 7) Head-to-head points; 8) Head-to-head goal difference; 9) Head-to-head goals scored.

== Oberosterreich ==
The Oberosterreich, OÖ Liga is a league competition, in which 16 football clubs from Upper Austria participate. The championship title is played between these clubs in 30 rounds, each team plays against all other teams in one home and one away match. The matches are drawn before each season. The best-placed team at the end of the season is made Upper Austrian Champion and advances to the Regional League Central. The number of relegated team from the OÖ Liga is variable and depends on the number of teams that descend from the Regional League Central. This depends on which association the relegated team from the first division belongs too.

Pos	Team	Pld	W	D	L	GF	GA	GD	Pts	Promotion or relegation
1	Union Dietach	22	16	3	3	50	16	+34	51	Promotion to 2025–26 Austrian Regionalliga
2	Friedburg/Pöndorf	22	14	3	5	48	23	+25	45	
3	Union Ostermiething	22	13	4	5	38	29	+9	43	
4	Sedda Bad Schallerbach	22	13	3	6	49	21	+28	42	
5	Union Mondsee	22	12	6	4	46	24	+22	42	
6	Vortuna Bad Leonfelden	22	10	6	6	36	33	+3	36	
7	Union Raika Weißkirchen	22	10	6	6	41	40	+1	36	
8	Union Edelweiß	22	9	4	9	38	40	−2	31	
9	Grün Weiß	22	8	4	10	40	44	−4	28	
10	Union HABAU Perg	22	7	6	9	28	25	+3	27	
11	Pregarten	22	6	4	12	28	35	−7	22	
12	Rohrbach/Berg	22	4	7	11	20	46	−26	19	Possible relegation to 2025–26 Austrian Landesliga
13	St. Martin im Mühlkreis	22	4	6	12	29	42	−13	18	Possible relegation to 2025–26 Austrian Landesliga
14	Bad Ischl	21	5	3	13	25	51	−26	18	Possible relegation to 2025–26 Austrian Landesliga
15	Gmunden	21	3	7	11	22	40	−18	16	Possible relegation to 2025–26 Austrian Landesliga
16	St. Valentin	22	3	4	15	22	51	−29	13	Relegation to 2025–26 Austrian 2. Landesliga

Updated to match(es) played on 19 April 2025. Source: Soccerway
Rules for classification: 1) Points; 2) Less matches awarded against; 3) Goal difference; 4) Goals scored; 5) Matches won; 6) Away matches won; 7) Head-to-head points; 8) Head-to-head goal difference; 9) Head-to-head goals scored.

== Steiermark ==
The divisions championship is made up of 16 teams. The championship is held in a home round and away round, both with 15 match days. The games are determined through a random draw prior to the start of the first round. The championship season consists of 30 game days.

After finishing the championship, the first placed team (champion) is entitled to promotion to the third-class Austrian Regional League Central. At the end of the championship season, as many lower ranking teams leave the Landesliga division that with regard to Styrian teams leaving the Austrian Regional League Central and Styrian top ranking teams moving up from the Oberliga divisions there are 16 teams in the Landesliga Steiermark. The number of teams that move from the Landesliga Steiermark to the Styrian Oberliga divisions varies because of this to three and four teams.

Pos	Team	Pld	W	D	L	GF	GA	GD	Pts	Promotion or relegation
1	Ilzer SV	24	14	7	3	56	24	+32	49	Promotion to 2025–26 Austrian Regionalliga
2	Kalsdorf	23	15	3	5	46	22	+24	48	
3	Tillmitsch	24	14	4	6	50	28	+22	46	
4	Allerheiligen	24	12	4	8	53	38	+15	40	
5	Hartberg II	24	11	5	8	40	33	+7	38	
6	Hohenhaus Schladming	23	10	7	6	34	35	−1	37	
7	Union Gamlitz	24	11	3	10	49	46	+3	36	
8	Lebring	23	10	4	9	45	34	+11	34	
9	UFC Fehring	23	8	8	7	34	36	−2	32	
10	TuS Bad Waltersdorf	24	9	3	12	36	47	−11	30	
11	Köflach	23	8	5	10	36	37	−1	29	Possible relegation to 2025–26 Austrian Landesliga
12	Fürstenfeld	24	8	5	11	33	40	−7	29	Possible relegation to 2025–26 Austrian Landesliga
13	Heiligenkreuz	23	7	6	10	30	43	−13	27	Possible relegation to 2025–26 Austrian Landesliga
14	Lafnitz II	23	7	4	12	38	52	−14	25	Possible relegation to 2025–26 Austrian Landesliga
15	Kindberg-Mürzhofen	24	6	5	13	44	54	−10	23	Relegation to 2025–26 Austrian 2. Landesliga
16	Frohnleiten (Y)	23	0	3	20	16	71	−55	3	Relegation to 2025–26 Austrian 2. Landesliga

Updated to match(es) played on 1 May 2025. Source: Soccerway
Rules for classification: 1) Points; 2) Less matches awarded against; 3) Goal difference; 4) Goals scored; 5) Matches won; 6) Away matches won; 7) Head-to-head points; 8) Head-to-head goal difference; 9) Head-to-head goals scored.
(Y) Can only reach possible relegation at best

== Salzburg ==
The Salzburger Liga, is the top division in Salzburg football and the fourth-highest division in Austria. The association responsible for the league is the Salzburg Football Association.

In general, per season one team moves up into the Austrian Regional League West, and two teams moves down to the Austrian 2. Landesliga. Depending on the number of clubs from Salzburg descending from the Regional League West the number of teams moving up from the Salzburger Liga can vary.

Pos	Team	Pld	W	D	L	GF	GA	GD	Pts	Promotion or relegation
1	Seekirchen 1945	24	22	0	2	95	20	+75	66	Promotion to 2025–26 Austrian Regionalliga
2	Grödig	24	19	1	4	60	21	+39	58	
3	Bramberg	23	14	5	4	52	25	+27	47	
4	Hallein	23	14	4	5	50	25	+25	46	
5	Bürmoos	23	12	3	8	37	27	+10	39	
6	Puch	24	11	3	10	43	33	+10	36	
7	Eugendorf	24	10	4	10	46	35	+11	34	
8	Straßwalchen	24	9	5	10	41	40	+1	32	
9	Siezenheim	23	9	4	10	37	41	−4	31	
10	Thalgau	23	8	6	9	44	49	−5	30	
11	Anif	24	7	8	9	31	41	−10	29	
12	Salzburger AK	24	4	8	12	41	61	−20	20	Possible relegation to 2025–26 Austrian Landesliga
13	Hallwang	23	5	4	14	32	62	−30	19	Possible relegation to 2025–26 Austrian Landesliga
14	Golling	23	4	5	14	30	67	−37	17	Possible relegation to 2025–26 Austrian Landesliga
15	Neumarkt am Wallersee	23	4	3	16	27	75	−48	15	Relegation to 2025–26 Austrian 2. Landesliga
16	ASV Salzburg	24	2	5	17	21	65	−44	11	Relegation to 2025–26 Austrian 2. Landesliga

Updated to match(es) played on 1 May 2025. Source: Soccerway
Rules for classification: 1) Points; 2) Less matches awarded against; 3) Goal difference; 4) Goals scored; 5) Matches won; 6) Away matches won; 7) Head-to-head points; 8) Head-to-head goal difference; 9) Head-to-head goals scored.

== Tirol ==
The competition is organized by the Tirol Football Association. The winners are promoted to the Austrian Regionalliga Central, and the two last placed clubs are relegated to the 2. Landesliga.

Pos	Team	Pld	W	D	L	GF	GA	GD	Pts	Promotion or relegation
1	Wacker Innsbruck	20	16	4	0	69	8	+61	52	Promotion to 2025–26 Austrian Regionalliga
2	Tirol II	20	13	4	3	60	27	+33	43	
3	St Johann in Tirol	20	13	3	4	50	29	+21	42	
4	Fügen	20	10	2	8	47	32	+15	32	
5	Telfs	20	9	4	7	29	37	−8	31	
6	Freisinger Ebbs	20	8	5	7	42	34	+8	29	
7	Kematen	20	8	5	7	28	27	+1	29	
8	Innsbrucker AC	20	5	7	8	35	42	−7	22	
9	Bio Perliner Wörgl	20	6	4	10	32	41	−9	22	
10	Kundl	20	6	4	10	28	42	−14	22	
11	Volders	20	6	4	10	30	48	−18	22	Possible relegation to 2025–26 Austrian Landesliga
12	Völser SV	20	6	3	11	23	41	−18	21	Possible relegation to 2025–26 Austrian Landesliga
13	Mils	20	3	4	13	31	61	−30	13	Relegation to 2025–26 Austrian 2. Landesliga
14	Silz / Mötz	20	3	3	14	31	66	−35	12	Relegation to 2025–26 Austrian 2. Landesliga

Updated to match(es) played on 27 April 2025. Source: Soccerway
Rules for classification: 1) Points; 2) Less matches awarded against; 3) Goal difference; 4) Goals scored; 5) Matches won; 6) Away matches won; 7) Head-to-head points; 8) Head-to-head goal difference; 9) Head-to-head goals scored.

== Vorarlberg ==
The league consists of 14 teams. In each season, each club plays against each other club in one home and one away match. A season is therefore made up of 26 games.

The champion of the Vorarlbergliga is entitled to move up to the third-tier, the Regionalliga West. If the champion refuses the promotion, this can lead to a relegation from the league, which has been implicated since the 2011–12 season. The number of teams that descend directly into the fifth class the Landesliga, depends on the number of teams from Vorarlberg which descend from the Regionalliga West. Every season, at least one club moves up. On the other hand, every year two teams move down directly to the Vorarlbergliga. In addition, since the 2014–15 season, at the end of the championship a relegation between the third placed team of the Landesliga and the lowest ranked non relegated team from the Vorarlbergliga is held. Relegation consists of a home and away game.

Pos	Team	Pld	W	D	L	GF	GA	GD	Pts	Promotion or relegation
1	Lustenau 07 (C, P)	26	16	5	5	64	32	+32	53	Promotion to 2025–26 Austrian Regionalliga
2	Admira Dornbirn	26	15	7	4	61	39	+22	52	
3	Brauerei Egg	26	15	5	6	62	44	+18	50	
4	Lochau	26	14	3	9	46	35	+11	45	
5	Wolfurt	26	13	4	9	50	39	+11	43	
6	Dornbirner SV	26	12	6	8	43	37	+6	42	
7	Rotenberg	26	10	8	8	61	57	+4	38	
8	Blau-Weiß Feldkirch	26	10	7	9	49	43	+6	37	
9	Hard	26	10	3	13	36	40	−4	33	
10	Ludesch	26	9	4	13	40	57	−17	31	
11	Göfis	26	8	5	13	42	52	−10	29	
12	Nenzing	26	7	8	11	42	48	−6	29	
13	Rot-Weiß Rankweil	26	4	4	18	34	68	−34	16	
14	Alberschwende (R)	26	4	1	21	21	64	−43	13	Relegation to 2025–26 Austrian 2. Landesliga

Source: Soccerway
Rules for classification: 1) Points; 2) Less matches awarded against; 3) Goal difference; 4) Goals scored; 5) Matches won; 6) Away matches won; 7) Head-to-head points; 8) Head-to-head goal difference; 9) Head-to-head goals scored.
(C) Champions; (P) Promoted; (R) Relegated

== See also ==
- 2024–25 Austrian Football Bundesliga
- 2024–25 Austrian Football Second League
- 2024–25 Austrian Cup
