= 2026–27 Austrian Landesliga =

Austrian Landesliga
- Season: 2026–27

The 2026–27 Austrian Landesliga is the 68th season of the Austrian fourth-tier football league.

The Landesliga is split into nine conferences, one for each Austrian state:

- Burgenland: Landesliga Burgenland
- Lower Austria: 1. Niederösterreichische Landesliga
- Vienna: Wiener Stadtliga

The champions of each conference are promoted to the Regional League East.

- Salzburg: Salzburger Liga
- Upper Austria: OÖ Liga

The champions of each conference are promoted to the Regional League North.

- Carinthia and East Tyrol: Kärntner Liga
- Styria: Landesliga Steiermark

The champions of each conference are promoted to the Regional League South.

- Tyrol (without East Tyrol): Tiroler Liga
- Vorarlberg: Vorarlbergliga

The champions of each conference are promoted to the Regional League West.

== Burgenland ==
The league is made up of sixteen teams playing one home and one away match against each other. A season therefore comprises 30 match days.

The end of the season the champion is entitled to promotion into the third-class Austrian Regional League East. The number of teams that descend into the fifth-class divisions 2. Liga Nord, 2. Liga Mitte and 2. Liga Süd varies depending on the number of relegated Burgenland teams in the Regional League East. From 2. Liga Nord, 2. Liga Mitte and 2. Liga Süd respectively, one club advances into the Burgenland Landesliga.

Pos	Team	Pld	W	D	L	GF	GA	GD	Pts	Promotion or relegation
1	Bad Sauerbrunn	9	6	2	1	24	8	+16	20	Promotion to 2027–28 Austrian Regionalliga
2	Klingenbach	9	6	1	2	19	10	+9	19	
3	Leithaprodersdorf	9	5	3	1	20	13	+7	18	
4	St. Margarethen	9	5	3	1	16	9	+7	18	
5	Neusiedl/See	9	4	4	1	13	11	+2	16	
6	Pinkafeld	9	4	3	2	20	13	+7	15	
7	Deutschkreutz	9	4	2	3	15	14	+1	14	
8	Halbturn	9	4	1	4	9	16	−7	13	
9	Pama	9	4	0	5	12	22	−10	12	
10	Freistadt Rust	9	3	1	5	17	17	0	10	
11	Edelserpentin	9	3	1	5	13	20	−7	10	
12	Eberau	9	2	3	4	14	14	0	9	
13	Oberpullendorf	9	3	0	6	14	16	−2	9	
14	Neudorf/Parndorf	9	2	3	4	10	16	−6	9	Relegation to 2027–28 Austrian 2. Landesliga
15	Kohfidisch	9	1	2	6	12	17	−5	5	Relegation to 2027–28 Austrian 2. Landesliga
16	Lackenbach	9	0	3	6	5	17	−12	3	Relegation to 2027–28 Austrian 2. Landesliga

Updated to match(es) played on 4 October 2026. Source: Flashscore
Rules for classification: 1) Points; 2) Less matches awarded against; 3) Goal difference; 4) Goals scored; 5) Matches won; 6) Away matches won; 7) Head-to-head points; 8) Head-to-head goal difference; 9) Head-to-head goals scored.

== Niederösterreich ==
In the 1. Niederösterreichische Landesliga, a total of 16 football clubs from Lower Austria participate.

The champion rises directly into the third-highest division, the Regional League East. In addition to the champion of the 1. Niederösterreichische Landesliga, the champions of the Burgenland national league and Wiener Stadtliga, also move up. Under the 1. Niederösterreichische Landesliga are the 2. Landesliga Ost and 2. Landesliga West.

Pos	Team	Pld	W	D	L	GF	GA	GD	Pts	Promotion or relegation
1	Wiener Neustadt	9	6	2	1	16	5	+11	20	Promotion to 2027–28 Austrian Regionalliga
2	Ebreichsdorf	9	5	3	1	29	17	+12	18	
3	Ybbs	9	5	2	2	14	8	+6	17	
4	Retz	9	5	1	3	17	12	+5	16	
5	Hohenau	9	5	1	3	13	11	+2	16	
6	Zwettl	9	4	3	2	11	10	+1	15	
7	Wieselburg	9	4	2	3	15	15	0	14	
8	Ardagger	9	3	4	2	18	12	+6	13	
9	Korneuburg	9	3	3	3	10	10	0	12	
10	Kilb	9	3	2	4	13	15	−2	11	
11	Admira Wacker II	9	3	1	5	14	19	−5	10	
12	St. Peter in der Au	9	2	3	4	16	20	−4	9	
13	Langenrohr	9	1	5	3	9	13	−4	8	
14	Ortmann	9	2	1	6	7	17	−10	7	
15	St. Pölten II	9	2	0	7	8	15	−7	6	
16	Amstetten II	9	1	3	5	10	21	−11	6	Relegation to 2027–28 Austrian 2. Landesliga

Updated to match(es) played on 3 October 2026. Source: Flashscore
Rules for classification: 1) Points; 2) Less matches awarded against; 3) Goal difference; 4) Goals scored; 5) Matches won; 6) Away matches won; 7) Head-to-head points; 8) Head-to-head goal difference; 9) Head-to-head goals scored.

== Wiener Stadtliga ==
The league is made up of sixteen teams playing one home and one away match against each other. A season therefore comprises 30 match days.

The end of the season the champion is entitled to promotion into the third-class Austrian Regional League East. The number of teams that descend into the fifth-class divisions 2. Landesliga varies depending on the number of relegated Vienna teams in the Regional League East. One club from the 2. Landesliga advances into the Wiener Stadtliga.

Pos	Team	Pld	W	D	L	GF	GA	GD	Pts	Promotion or relegation
1	Mauer	7	6	1	0	19	2	+17	19	Promotion to 2027–28 Austrian Regionalliga
2	Red Star Penzing	7	6	1	0	17	5	+12	19	
3	Elektra	7	5	0	2	13	9	+4	15	
4	LAC Inter	7	5	0	2	16	12	+4	15	
5	Floridsdorfer AC II	7	4	1	2	12	8	+4	13	
6	Schwechat	7	4	0	3	14	10	+4	12	
7	Dinamo Helfort	7	3	2	2	13	7	+6	11	
8	Slovan HAC	7	2	2	3	10	12	−2	8	
9	Brigittenau	7	2	1	4	8	14	−6	7	
10	1980 Wien	7	2	1	4	7	17	−10	7	
11	First Vienna II	7	2	1	4	14	18	−4	7	
12	Gerasdorf/Stammersdorf	7	1	3	3	9	16	−7	6	
13	Austria-XIII Auhof Center	7	1	3	3	8	10	−2	6	
14	Hellas Kagran	7	1	2	4	10	16	−6	5	
15	Post Wien	7	1	2	4	13	10	+3	5	
16	Simmeringer SC	7	1	0	6	3	20	−17	3	Relegation to 2027–28 Austrian 2. Landesliga

Updated to match(es) played on 4 October 2026. Source: Flashscore
Rules for classification: 1) Points; 2) Less matches awarded against; 3) Goal difference; 4) Goals scored; 5) Matches won; 6) Away matches won; 7) Head-to-head points; 8) Head-to-head goal difference; 9) Head-to-head goals scored.

== Kärnten ==
The Kärnten League is organized as a league system competition in which, since 2003/04, 16 teams participate. The games are played in 30 championship rounds, each divided into a home and away round. The games and venues are drawn at the beginning of the season. The champions acquired the title Kärnter Landesmeister and are given the right to a promotion into the Austrian Regional League South.

Pos	Team	Pld	W	D	L	GF	GA	GD	Pts	Promotion or relegation
1	St. Veit	10	6	4	0	32	13	+19	22	Promotion to 2027–28 Austrian Regionalliga
2	Launsdorf	10	7	1	2	23	14	+9	22	
3	Klagenfurter AC	10	6	2	2	26	12	+14	20	
4	Klagenfurt/Celovec	10	6	2	2	19	10	+9	20	
5	Grafenstein	10	5	3	2	24	14	+10	18	
6	Landskron	10	5	2	3	23	21	+2	17	
7	Matrei	10	4	4	2	21	16	+5	16	
8	Ferlach	10	4	3	3	17	11	+6	15	
9	Lendorf	10	5	0	5	23	18	+5	15	
10	Seeboden	10	3	4	3	22	28	−6	13	
11	Spittal/Drau	10	3	3	4	16	16	0	12	
12	St. Michael/Lavanttal	10	3	3	4	17	20	−3	12	
13	Sirnitz	10	2	3	5	17	28	−11	9	
14	Dellach/Gail	10	1	3	6	14	22	−8	6	
15	Kottmannsdorf	10	0	2	8	13	32	−19	2	
16	Nußdorf/Debant	10	0	1	9	7	39	−32	1	Relegation to 2027–28 Austrian 2. Landesliga

Updated to match(es) played on 4 October 2026. Source: Flashscore
Rules for classification: 1) Points; 2) Less matches awarded against; 3) Goal difference; 4) Goals scored; 5) Matches won; 6) Away matches won; 7) Head-to-head points; 8) Head-to-head goal difference; 9) Head-to-head goals scored.

== Oberosterreich ==
The Oberosterreich, OÖ Liga is a league competition, in which 16 football clubs from Upper Austria participate. The championship title is played between these clubs in 30 rounds, each team plays against all other teams in one home and one away match. The matches are drawn before each season. The best-placed team at the end of the season is made Upper Austrian Champion and advances to the Regional League North. The number of relegated team from the OÖ Liga is variable and depends on the number of teams that descend from the Regional League North. This depends on which association the relegated team from the first division belongs to.

Pos	Team	Pld	W	D	L	GF	GA	GD	Pts	Promotion or relegation
1	Mondsee	10	8	1	1	25	5	+20	25	Promotion to 2027–28 Austrian Regionalliga
2	Andorf	10	7	2	1	23	9	+14	23	
3	Edelweiß Linz	10	7	1	2	26	10	+16	22	
4	Friedburg	10	6	3	1	20	16	+4	21	
5	Perg	10	5	3	2	16	7	+9	18	
6	Grün-Weiß Micheldorf	10	5	1	4	15	17	−2	16	
7	St. Valentin	10	4	3	3	17	16	+1	15	
8	Weißkirchen	10	3	5	2	14	12	+2	14	
9	Unis Gschwandt	9	3	2	4	13	15	−2	11	
10	Ostermiething	9	4	1	4	13	16	−3	13	
11	Garsten	10	3	2	5	19	20	−1	11	
12	Gmunden	10	3	1	6	13	19	−6	10	
13	Bad Ischl	10	2	2	6	14	19	−5	8	
14	Vöcklamarkt	10	1	3	6	10	24	−14	6	Relegation to 2027–28 Austrian 2. Landesliga
15	Pregarten	10	1	1	8	11	27	−16	4	Relegation to 2027–28 Austrian 2. Landesliga
16	St. Martin im Mühlkreis	10	1	1	8	7	24	−17	4	Relegation to 2027–28 Austrian 2. Landesliga

Updated to match(es) played on 3 October 2026. Source: Flashscore
Rules for classification: 1) Points; 2) Less matches awarded against; 3) Goal difference; 4) Goals scored; 5) Matches won; 6) Away matches won; 7) Head-to-head points; 8) Head-to-head goal difference; 9) Head-to-head goals scored.

== Steiermark ==
The divisions championship is made up of 16 teams. The championship is held in a home round and away round, both with 15 match days. The games are determined through a random draw prior to the start of the first round. The championship season consists of 30 game days.

After finishing the championship, the first placed team (champion) is entitled to promotion to the third-class Austrian Regional League South. At the end of the championship season, as many lower ranking teams leave the Landesliga division that with regard to Styrian teams leaving the Austrian Regional League South and Styrian top ranking teams moving up from the Oberliga divisions there are 16 teams in the Landesliga Steiermark. The number of teams that move from the Landesliga Steiermark to the Styrian Oberliga divisions varies because of this to three and four teams.

Pos	Team	Pld	W	D	L	GF	GA	GD	Pts	Promotion or relegation
1	Ilzer SV	9	6	2	1	24	13	+11	20	Promotion to 2027–28 Austrian Regionalliga
2	Weindorf St. Anna	9	5	3	1	16	11	+5	18	
3	Schermann Rohrbach	9	5	3	1	21	11	+10	18	
4	Köflach	9	5	1	3	19	7	+12	16	
5	Gnas	9	5	1	3	17	8	+9	16	
6	Stadtwerke Bruck/Mur	9	5	1	3	23	19	+4	16	
7	Hohenhaus Schladming	9	4	3	2	19	15	+4	15	
8	Wildon	9	4	3	2	18	10	+8	15	
9	Pachern	9	4	1	4	10	15	−5	13	
10	Großklein	9	3	2	4	14	20	−6	11	
11	Fürstenfeld	9	3	2	4	13	19	−6	11	
12	Bad Waltersdorf	9	2	3	4	12	15	−3	9	
13	Lebring	9	2	2	5	15	17	−2	8	
14	Fehring	9	2	2	5	8	15	−7	8	Relegation to 2027–28 Austrian 2. Landesliga
15	Kindberg	9	2	1	6	14	26	−12	7	Relegation to 2027–28 Austrian 2. Landesliga
16	Leoben	9	0	0	9	8	30	−22	0	Relegation to 2027–28 Austrian 2. Landesliga

Updated to match(es) played on 3 October 2026. Source: Flashscore
Rules for classification: 1) Points; 2) Less matches awarded against; 3) Goal difference; 4) Goals scored; 5) Matches won; 6) Away matches won; 7) Head-to-head points; 8) Head-to-head goal difference; 9) Head-to-head goals scored.

== Salzburg ==
The Salzburger Liga, is the top division in Salzburg football and the fourth-highest division in Austria. The association responsible for the league is the Salzburg Football Association.

In general, per season one team moves up into the Austrian Regional League North, and two teams moves down to the Austrian 2. Landesliga. Depending on the number of clubs from Salzburg descending from the Regional League North the number of teams moving up from the Salzburger Liga can vary.

Pos	Team	Pld	W	D	L	GF	GA	GD	Pts	Promotion or relegation
1	Straßwalchen	10	9	0	1	30	9	+21	27	Promotion to 2027–28 Austrian Regionalliga
2	Bürmoos	10	8	2	0	28	9	+19	26	
3	Anif	10	7	0	3	31	15	+16	21	
4	Puch	10	6	3	1	28	15	+13	21	
5	Seekirchen U21	10	6	1	3	22	17	+5	19	
6	Salzburger AK	10	5	1	4	15	14	+1	16	
7	Bramberg	10	4	3	3	25	23	+2	15	
8	Eugendorf	10	4	2	4	27	23	+4	14	
9	Golling	10	4	1	5	26	20	+6	13	
10	Henndorf	10	3	2	5	23	30	−7	11	
11	Thalgau	10	3	1	6	11	22	−11	10	
12	1960 Berndorf	10	3	1	6	21	25	−4	10	
13	Siezenheim	10	2	4	4	16	22	−6	10	
14	ATSV Salzburg	10	2	1	7	12	36	−24	7	Relegation to 2027–28 Austrian 2. Landesliga
15	Neumarkt	10	1	2	7	21	32	−11	5	Relegation to 2027–28 Austrian 2. Landesliga
16	Schwarzach	10	1	0	9	6	30	−24	3	Relegation to 2027–28 Austrian 2. Landesliga

Updated to match(es) played on 4 October 2026. Source: Flashscore
Rules for classification: 1) Points; 2) Less matches awarded against; 3) Goal difference; 4) Goals scored; 5) Matches won; 6) Away matches won; 7) Head-to-head points; 8) Head-to-head goal difference; 9) Head-to-head goals scored.

== Tirol ==
The competition is organized by the Tirol Football Association. The winners are promoted to the Austrian Regionalliga West, and the two last placed clubs are relegated to the 2. Landesliga.

Pos	Team	Pld	W	D	L	GF	GA	GD	Pts	Promotion or relegation
1	Kundl	10	7	1	2	30	13	+17	22	Promotion to 2027–28 Austrian Regionalliga
2	Haiming/Ötztal	10	6	2	2	26	10	+16	20	
3	Kematen	10	6	2	2	28	14	+14	20	
4	Absam	10	5	4	1	26	18	+8	19	
5	Innsbrucker AC	10	4	4	2	17	10	+7	16	
6	Telfs	10	4	3	3	18	14	+4	15	
7	Mils	10	4	3	3	14	18	−4	15	
8	Volders	10	4	2	4	9	13	−4	14	
9	Natters	10	3	3	4	15	21	−6	12	
10	Ebbs	10	3	3	4	24	18	+6	12	
11	Völser	10	3	2	5	14	17	−3	11	
12	Stubai	10	3	1	6	12	21	−9	10	
13	Oberperfuss	10	2	3	5	16	21	−5	9	
14	Münster	10	2	3	5	9	24	−15	9	
15	Kolsass/Weer	10	3	0	7	10	29	−19	9	
16	Wörgl	10	1	4	5	13	20	−7	7	Relegation to 2027–28 Austrian 2. Landesliga

Updated to match(es) played on 4 October 2026. Source: Flashscore
Rules for classification: 1) Points; 2) Less matches awarded against; 3) Goal difference; 4) Goals scored; 5) Matches won; 6) Away matches won; 7) Head-to-head points; 8) Head-to-head goal difference; 9) Head-to-head goals scored.

== Vorarlberg ==
The league consists of 14 teams. In each season, each club plays against each other club in one home and one away match. A season is therefore made up of 26 games.

The champion of the Vorarlbergliga is entitled to move up to the third-tier, the Regionalliga West. If the champion refuses the promotion, this can lead to a relegation from the league, which has been implicated since the 2011–12 season. The number of teams that descend directly into the fifth class the Landesliga, depends on the number of teams from Vorarlberg which descend from the Regionalliga West. Every season, at least one club moves up. On the other hand, every year two teams move down directly to the Vorarlbergliga. In addition, since the 2014–15 season, at the end of the championship a relegation between the third placed team of the Landesliga and the lowest ranked non relegated team from the Vorarlbergliga is held. Relegation consists of a home and away game.

Pos	Team	Pld	W	D	L	GF	GA	GD	Pts	Promotion or relegation
1	Brauerei Egg	8	6	2	0	22	10	+12	20	Promotion to 2027–28 Austrian Regionalliga
2	Admira Dornbirn	8	5	1	2	19	16	+3	16	
3	Rotenberg	8	4	3	1	16	9	+7	15	
4	Bizau	7	3	3	1	8	6	+2	12	
5	Nenzing	8	3	3	2	15	11	+4	12	
6	Dornbirner SV	8	3	3	2	10	10	0	12	
7	Schlins	8	3	2	3	10	15	−5	11	
8	Andelsbuch	8	2	3	3	10	11	−1	9	
9	Riefensberg	8	2	3	3	11	13	−2	9	
10	Hard	8	2	2	4	17	17	0	8	
11	Blau-Weiß Feldkirch	7	2	1	4	9	11	−2	7	
12	Alberschwende	8	2	1	5	6	10	−4	7	
13	Austria Lustenau II	8	2	1	5	11	17	−6	7	Relegation to 2027–28 Austrian 2. Landesliga
14	Ludesch	8	2	0	6	11	19	−8	6	Relegation to 2027–28 Austrian 2. Landesliga

Updated to match(es) played on 4 October 2026. Source: Flashscore
Rules for classification: 1) Points; 2) Less matches awarded against; 3) Goal difference; 4) Goals scored; 5) Matches won; 6) Away matches won; 7) Head-to-head points; 8) Head-to-head goal difference; 9) Head-to-head goals scored.

== See also ==
- 2026–27 Austrian Football Bundesliga
- 2026–27 Austrian Football Second League
- 2026–27 Austrian Regionalliga
- 2026–27 Austrian Cup
