= 2013–14 Austrian Cup =

2013–14 Austrian FA Cup
ÖFB Cup (German)

Tournament details
- Country: Austria
- Teams: 64

Final positions
- Champions: Red Bull Salzburg
- Runners-up: St. Pölten

Tournament statistics
- Top goal scorer(s): Sadio Mané (5); Alan (5)

The 2013–14 Austrian Cup (German: ÖFB-Samsung-Cup) was the 80th season of Austria's nationwide football cup competition. It commenced with the matches of the First Round on 12 July 2013 and was concluded with the last match in May 2014.

== First round ==
The draw for this round was on 1 July 2013. The match took place between 12 and 14 July 2013.

Team 1	Score	Team 2
12 July 2013
Ober-Grafendorf (III)	2–5	Amstetten (III)
SAK Klagenfurt (III)	3–1	Union Vöcklamarkt (III)
Blau-Weiß Linz (III)	1–5	Mattersburg (II)
Leopoldsdorf (III)	1–2 (a.e.t.)	Parndorf (II)
Lafnitz (III)	0–4	Rheindorf Altach (II)
Dorbirn (III)	1–2	First Vienna (II)
Wals-Grünau (III)	1–2	St. Pölten (II)
Bregenz (III)	0–4	Ried (I)
Leoben (III)	2–3	Kapfenberger SV (II)
Seekirchen (III)	0–2	Admira Wacker Mödling (I)
FAC Team für Wien (III)	3–1	Kufstein (III)
Oberwart (III)	0–3	Austria Wien (I)
Schwechat (III)	0–3	Kalsdorf (III)
Sollenau (III)	1–1 (a.e.t.) (4–3 p)	Wiener SK (III)
13 July 2013
Pinkafeld (III)	4–2 (a.e.t.)	Neumarkt (III)
Bad Vöslau (III)	2–3	Hartberg (II)
Austria Salzburg (III)	1–1 (a.e.t.) (6–5 p)	Grödig (I)
Dornbirner SV (III)	1–0	Kitzbühel (III)
Austria Klagenfurt (III)	3–2	Wiener Viktoria (III)
Hard (III)	1–3	Horn (II)
Schwaz (III)	0–3	Wolfsberger AC (I)
Draßburg (III)	0–3	Wiener Neustadt (I)
Retz (III)	0–0 (a.e.t.) (2–4 p)	Vorwärts Steyr (III)
St. Veit (III)	1–5	Lankowitz (III)
Villacher SV (III)	5–5 (a.e.t.) (4–3 p)	Wattens (III)
St. Johann (III)	0–5	Pasching (III)
Team Wiener Linien (III)	0–5	Sturm Graz (I)
Mannsdorf (III)	1–0 (a.e.t.)	Gratkorn (II)
Stegersbach (III)	0–2	Austria Lustenau (II)
14 July 2013
LASK Linz (III)	0–0 (a.e.t.) (5–4 p)	Rapid Wien (I)
Allerheiligen (III)	1–4	Wacker Innsbruck (I)
Union St. Florian (III)	0–9	Red Bull Salzburg (I)

== Second round ==
The draw for this round was on 6 August 2013. The matches took place on 23−25 September 2013.

Team 1	Score	Team 2
23 September 2013
SAK Klagenfurt (III)	4–2 (a.e.t.)	Hartberg (II)
LASK Linz (III)	3–4	St. Pölten (II)
Villacher SV (III)	0–3	Kapfenberger SV (II)
24 September 2013
Austria Salzburg (III)	1–1 (a.e.t.) (2–4 p)	Mattersburg (II)
Austria Klagenfurt (III)	0–2	Parndorf (II)
Vorwärts Steyr (III)	1–2	Austria Lustenau (II)
Kalsdorf (III)	2–1	Austria Wien (I)
Amstetten (III)	2–1	Rheindorf Altach (II)
Sollenau (III)	0–4	First Vienna (II)
Mannsdorf (III)	4–6 (a.e.t.)	Horn (II)
Pasching (III)	2–1	Wacker Innsbruck (I)
25 September 2013
Dornbirner SV (III)	0–2	Ried (I)
Sturm Graz (I)	3–0 (a.e.t.)	Wiener Neustadt (I)
Pinkafeld (III)	1–4	Wolfsberger AC (I)
Lankowitz (III)	1–1 (a.e.t.) (5–6 p)	Red Bull Salzburg (I)
FAC Team für Wien (III)	0–0 (a.e.t.) (5–6 p)	Admira Wacker Mödling (I)

== Third round ==
The draw for this round was on 29 September 2013. The matches took place on 28−30 October 2013.

28 October 2013	Kalsdorf (III)	0–4	St. Pölten (II)	Kalsdorf
19:00			Schibany 63', 79'; Hofbauer 64'; Jano 76'	Stadium: Sportzentrum Kalsdorf; Referee: Christian Dintar

28 October 2013	Horn (II)	5–4	Parndorf (II)	Horn
19:30	Sahanek 38'; Dilic 40', 73', 90+1'; Hartl 89'		Salamon 26', 48'; Lindner 54'; Kienzl 63'	Stadium: Waldviertler Volksbank Arena; Referee: Bernd Hirschbichler

29 October 2013	Pasching (III)	2–4 (a.e.t.)	Wolfsberger AC (I)	Pasching
18:00	Casanova 47'; Kablar 70'		Kerhe 48'; Topčagić 72'; Hüttenbrenner 100'; Putsche 118'	Stadium: Waldstadion

29 October 2013	Klagenfurt (III)	0–1	Ried (I)	Klagenfurt
18:00			Hinum 34'	Stadium: Stadion SAK

29 October 2013	Amstetten (III)	2–0	Mattersburg (II)	Amstetten
19:30	Zemann 20'; Holzer 76'			Stadium: Ertl Glas Stadion

29 October 2013	Admira Wacker Mödling (I)	3–1	First Vienna (II)	Maria Enzersdorf
19:30	Thürauer 21'; Schick 70'; Sax 83'		Becirovic 90' (pen.)	Stadium: Bundesstadion Südstadt

30 October 2013	Austria Lustenau (II)	0–4	Sturm Graz (I)	Lustenau
18:00			Offenbacher 21', 58'; Hadžić 79'; F. Kainz 87'	Stadium: Reichshofstadion

30 October 2013	Kapfenberger SV (II)	1–7	Red Bull Salzburg (I)	Kapfenberg
19:00	Bingöl 11'		Ramalho 21'; Berisha 25', 50'; Alan 59'; Schiemer 63'; Schwegler 82'; Mané 85'	Stadium: Franz Fekete Stadium

== Quarter-finals ==
The draw for this round was on 3 November 2013. The matches took place on 8 & 15–16 April 2014.

8 April 2014	Admira Wacker Mödling (I)	0–1	Sturm Graz (I)	Maria Enzersdorf
18:00			Hadžić 50'	Stadium: Bundesstadion Südstadt

15 April 2014	Ried (I)	1–2	St. Pölten (II)	Ried
20:30	Walch 13'		Sadović 9'; Bozkurt 57'	Stadium: Keine Sorgen Arena

15 April 2014	Horn (II)	2–0	Amstetten (III)	Horn
20:30	Sittsam 69'; Đorđević 79' (pen.)			Stadium: Waldviertler Volksbank Arena

16 April 2014	Wolfsberger AC (I)	0–6	Red Bull Salzburg (I)	Wolfsberg
18:00			Klein 49'; Ramalho 59'; Alan 72', 90+1'; Žulj 77'; Meilinger 90'	Stadium: Lavanttal-Arena

== Semi-finals ==
The draw for this round was on 20 April 2014. The matches took place on 7 May 2014.

7 May 2014	Horn (II)	0–7	Red Bull Salzburg (I)	Horn
18:00			Antonitsch 29' (o.g.); Mané 31', 66', 80'; Kampl 53'; Alan 75'; Žulj 84'	Stadium: Waldviertler Volksbank Arena

7 May 2014	St. Pölten (II)	1–0 (a.e.t.)	Sturm Graz (I)	Sankt Pölten
20:30	Noël 98'			Stadium: NV Arena

== Final ==
The final was played on 18 May 2014 at the Wörthersee Stadion in Klagenfurt.

Team 1	Score	Team 2
Red Bull Salzburg (1)	4–2	St. Pölten (II)

=== Details ===
18 May 2014
16:30

Red Bull Salzburg (I)	4–2	St. Pölten (II)
Klein 36'; Kampl 42'; Soriano 63', 67'	Report	Jano 40'; Noël 70'

Wörthersee Stadion, Klagenfurt
Attendance: 11,700
Referee: Christian Dintar

GK	31	(Hungary) Péter Gulácsi
RB	6	(Switzerland) Christian Schwegler
CB	36	(Austria) Martin Hinteregger
CB	5	(Brazil) André Ramalho
LB	17	(Austria) Andreas Ulmer
CM	24	(Austria) Christoph Leitgeb	(substituted off) 77'
CM	13	(Austria) Stefan Ilsanker
RW	8	(Austria) Florian Klein
LW	44	(Slovenia) Kevin Kampl
CF	27	(Brazil) Alan	(substituted off) 58'
CF	26	(Spain) Jonatan Soriano	(substituted off) 87'
Substitutes:
GK	33	(Germany) Alexander Walke
DF	15	(Austria) Franz Schiemer
MF	14	(Kosovo) Valon Berisha	(substituted on) 58'
MF	22	(Austria) Stefan Hierländer	(substituted on) 77'
MF	37	(Austria) Valentino Lazaro
MF	11	(Austria) Marco Meilinger
CF	23	(Austria) Robert Žulj	(substituted on) 87'
Manager:
(Germany) Roger Schmidt

GK	40	(Austria) Patrick Kostner
RB	25	(Austria) Andreas Dober	(yellow card) 54'
CB	15	(Austria) Martin Grasegger
CB	5	(Poland) Tomasz Wisio
LB	23	(Austria) Marcel Holzmann
CM	4	(Austria) Peter Brandl		(substituted off) 30'
CM	10	(Spain) Jano
RW	12	(Austria) Bernhard Fucik		(substituted off) 53'
AM	7	(Austria) Konstantin Kerschbaumer	(yellow card) 48'	(substituted off) 80'
LW	11	(Austria) Dominik Hofbauer
CF	9	(Austria) Mirnel Sadović
Substitutes:
GK	32	(Austria) Lukas Schwaiger
DF	3	(Austria) Michael Huber
MF	8	(Austria) Michael Ambichl
MF	20	(Austria) Lukas Kragl		(substituted on) 30'
FW	22	(Austria) Osman Bozkurt		(substituted on) 80'
FW	21	(Austria) Jannick Schibany
FW	16	(Mauritius) Gary Noël		(substituted on) 53'
Manager:
(Austria) Gerald Baumgartner
