= Sebastian Santin =

Austrian footballer (born 1994)

Personal information
- Date of birth: 15 June 1994 (age 32)
- Place of birth: Bregenz, Austria
- Height: 1.81 m (5 ft 11 in)
- Position: Right midfielder

Team information
- Current team: FC Dornbirn
- Number: 14

Youth career
- 2000–2011: FC Hard

Senior career*
Years	Team	Apps	(Gls)
2011–2018	FC Hard	152	(31)
2017–2018	→ WSG Wattens (loan)	30	(0)
2018–2020	WSG Wattens	47	(4)
2020–2021	FC Vaduz	8	(0)
2021–2025	FC Dornbirn	94	(13)
2025–	FC Hard	22	(8)
- * Club domestic league appearances and goals as of 11:21, 10 January 2026 (UTC)

Sebastian Santin (born 15 June 1994) is an Austrian professional footballer who plays as a midfielder for Eliteliga Vorarlberg club FC Hard.

== Club career ==
He made his Austrian Football First League debut for WSG Wattens on 21 July 2017 in a game against TSV Hartberg.
