= Dursun Karatay =

Austrian-Turkish footballer

Personal information
- Date of birth: 5 October 1984 (age 42)
- Place of birth: Bludenz, Austria
- Height: 1.79 m (5 ft 10 1/2 in)
- Positions: Attacking midfielder; forward

Team information
- Current team: FC Koblach

Senior career*
Years	Team	Apps	(Gls)
2002–2005	SC Austria Lustenau	68	(14)
2005–2007	SK Austria Kärnten	40	(4)
2007–2009	SC Rheindorf Altach	39	(7)
2009–2010	Konyaspor	1	(0)
2010–2012	SC Austria Lustenau	54	(7)
2012–2013	USV Eschen/Mauren	14	(9)
2013	FC Lustenau 07	16	(5)
2013–2014	USV Eschen/Mauren	13	(2)
2014	FC Dornbirn 1913		
2014	SC Brühl	11	(1)
2015	Dornbirner SV		
2015–2017	FC Diepoldsau-Schmitter		
2018–2020	FC Montlingen		
2020	FC Widnau II		
2020–2021	FC Hörbranz		
2021–	FC Koblach		

International career^{‡}
2005	Austria U21	1	(0)
- * Club domestic league appearances and goals as of 16:06, 14 June 2009 (UTC) ‡ National team caps and goals as of 9 November 2005

Dursun Karatay (born 5 October 1984) is an Austrian football player of Turkish descent who plays for an Austrian fourth-tier Vorarlbergliga club FC Koblach.
