= Julien Richter =

German footballer

Personal information
- Date of birth: 10 April 1999 (age 27)
- Place of birth: Burghausen, Germany
- Height: 1.81 m (5 ft 11 in)
- Positions: Centre-forward; left winger

Team information
- Current team: Union Ostermiething

Youth career
- Wacker Burghausen
- –2015: 1. FC Nürnberg
- 2015–2017: Wacker Burghausen

Senior career*
Years	Team	Apps	(Gls)
2017–2020	Wacker Burghausen	85	(9)
2020–2022	SpVgg Unterhaching	18	(0)
2022	→ 1860 Rosenheim (loan)	12	(1)
2022–	Union Ostermiething	0	(0)
- * Club domestic league appearances and goals as of 00:29, 28 July 2022 (UTC)

Julien Richter (born 10 April 1999) is a German professional footballer who plays as a centre-forward or left winger for OÖ Liga club Union Ostermiething.

== Career ==
=== Wacker Burgahausen ===
Born in Burghausen, Richter played youth football for Wacker Burghausen and 1. FC Nürnberg, before switching back to Wacker Burghausen in 2015. Richter made his debut for Wacker Burghausen on 28 April 2017 as a late substitute in a 1–0 win at home to SpVgg Bayreuth in the Regionalliga Bayern. He made four further appearances between then and the end of the season for Wacker Burghausen. In July 2017, his contract with the club was extended until June 2019.

He scored his first senior goal on 27 April 2018 with the opening goal of a 4–0 home league victory over 1. FC Nürnberg II. He made 30 league appearances across the 2017–18 season, scoring one goal. In May 2018, he extended his contract with Wacker Burghausen for a further year until summer 2020.

The 2018–19 season saw Richter score 6 goals in 29 league appearances, whilst he scored twice in 21 appearances prior to the suspension of the 2019–20 season.

=== SpVgg Unterhaching ===
In June 2020, it was announced that Richter was to join SpVgg Unterhaching on free transfer for the 2020–21 season, signing a three-year contract. He made his debut for Unterhaching on 19 December 2020 as a substitute in a 1–1 draw at home to Bayern Munich II. He made 10 appearances in the 3. Liga as Unterhaching were relegated to the Regionalliga Bayern.

After 8 Regionalliga Bayern appearances in the first half of the 2021–22 season, Richter joined 1860 Rosenheim on loan in January 2022 until the end of the season, with Rosenheim bottom of the Regionalliga Bayern.

=== Austria ===
Richter signed for OÖ Liga club Union Ostermiething in summer 2022.

== Career statistics ==
As of 3 February 2022

Appearances and goals by club, season and competition
Club	Season	League			DFB-Pokal		Other		Total	
Club	Season	Division	Apps	Goals	Apps	Goals	Apps	Goals	Apps	Goals
Wacker Burghausen	2016–17	Regionalliga Bayern	5	0	—		0	0	5	0
Wacker Burghausen	2017–18	Regionalliga Bayern	30	1	—		0	0	30	1
Wacker Burghausen	2018–19	Regionalliga Bayern	29	6	—		0	0	29	6
Wacker Burghausen	2019–21	Regionalliga Bayern	21	2	—		0	0	21	2
Wacker Burghausen	Total		85	9	0	0	0	0	85	9
SpVgg Unterhaching	2020–21	3. Liga	10	0	—		0	0	10	0
SpVgg Unterhaching	2021–22	Regionalliga Bayern	8	0	—		0	0	8	0
SpVgg Unterhaching	Total		18	0	0	0	0	0	18	0
Career total			103	9	0	0	0	0	103	9
