= Stephan Schimandl =

Austrian footballer (born 1999)

Personal information
- Date of birth: 30 March 1999 (age 27)
- Place of birth: Mattersburg, Austria
- Height: 1.84 m (6 ft 0 in)
- Position: Midfielder

Team information
- Current team: SC-ESV Parndorf 1919
- Number: 17

Senior career*
| Years | Team | Apps | (Gls) |
| 2016–2020 | SV Mattersburg II | 74 | (17) |
| 2018–2020 | SV Mattersburg | 10 | (1) |
| 2020–2021 | SV Horn | 24 | (1) |
| 2021–2022 | First Vienna | 10 | (0) |
| 2022–2023 | TSV Hartberg II | 20 | (5) |
| 2023–2024 | ASV Draßburg | 28 | (13) |
| 2024–2025 | FCM Traiskirchen | 23 | (5) |
| 2025– | SC/ESV Parndorf 1919 | 29 | (3) |
- * Club domestic league appearances and goals as of 28 June 2026

Stephan Schimandl (born 30 March 1999) is an Austrian footballer who plays for Austrian Regionalliga East club SC/ESV Parndorf 1919.

== Club career ==
On 21 August 2020, he signed with SV Horn.

On 7 July 2021, he moved to First Vienna on a one-year contract. The following season, he played for TSV Hartberg's reserves, before joining ASV Draßburg in 2023. There, he scored 13 league goals in 28 appearances as the club suffered relegation from the Austrian Regionalliga East.

On 8 June 2024, Schimandl signed with Regionalliga East club FCM Traiskirchen.
