= Julian Salamon =

Austrian footballer

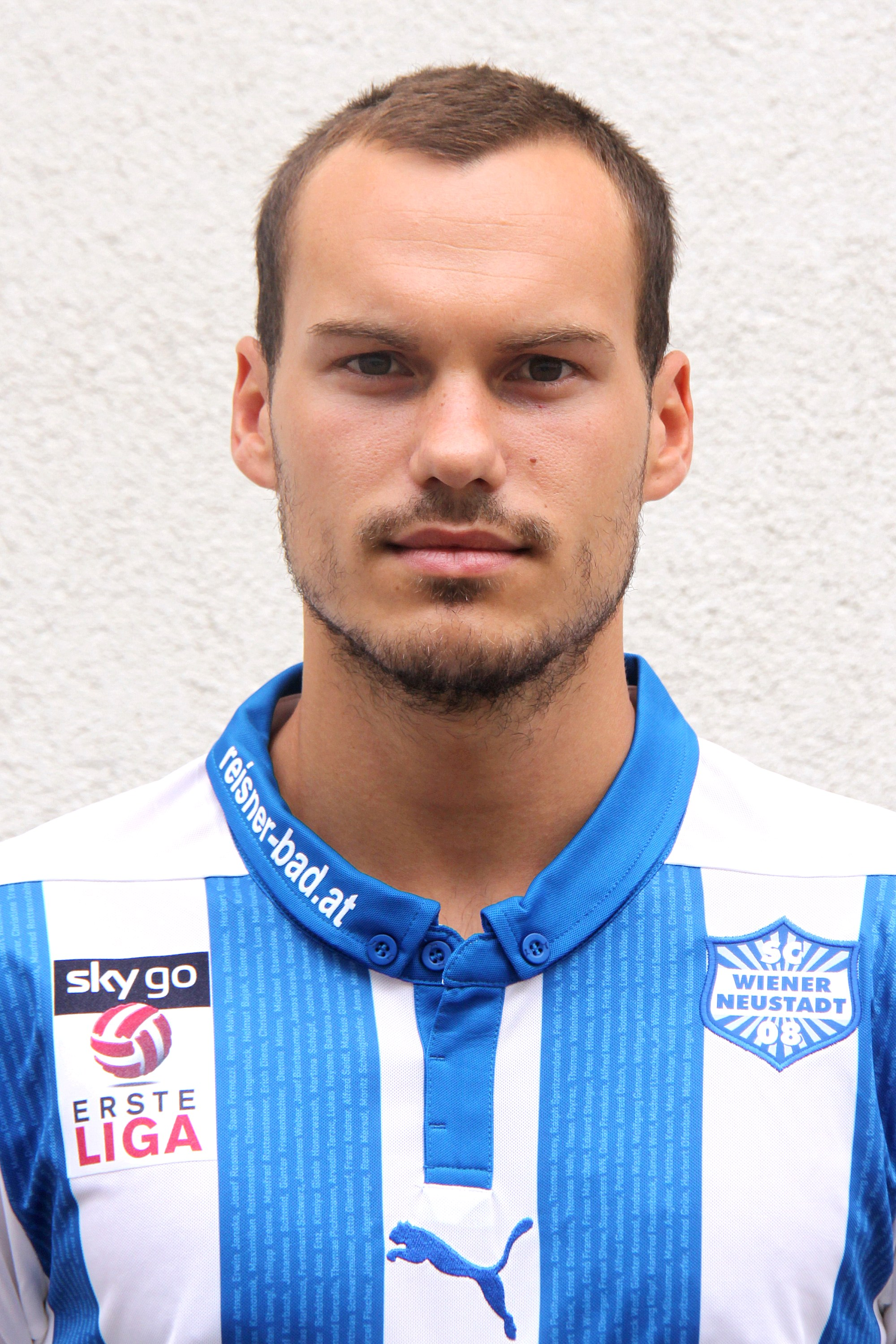

Personal information
- Date of birth: 1 May 1991 (age 35)
- Place of birth: Oberpullendorf, Austria
- Height: 1.75 m (5 ft 9 in)
- Position: Forward

Team information
- Current team: SC Ortmann
- Number: 9

Youth career
- 1999–2003: SV Edelpute
- 2003–2004: Mattersburg
- 2004–2006: AKA Burgenland
- 2006–2009: Austria Wien

Senior career*
Years	Team	Apps	(Gls)
2009–2011	Neusiedl am See	47	(20)
2011–2014	SC/ESV Parndorf	46	(11)
2014–2016	Wiener Neustadt	23	(3)
2016	SC Mannsdorf	7	(0)
2017	Neusiedl am See	25	(4)
2018–2019	ASK Elektra	39	(9)
2019–2020	ASV Siegendorf	7	(2)
2020–	SC Ortmann	6	(2)
- * Club domestic league appearances and goals as of 11:09, 1 August 2021 (UTC)

Julian Salamon (born 1 May 1991) is an Austrian footballer who currently plays for SC Ortmann.

He has previously played for SC Neusiedl am See 1919, SC-ESV Parndorf 1919 and SC Wiener Neustadt.

== Honours ==
=== Club ===
SC-ESV Parndorf 1919

- Austrian Regional League East (1): 2012-13

== Personal ==
He is the brother of professional footballer Thomas Salamon.
