= 2013–14 Austrian Regionalliga =

Austrian Regional Leagues
- Season: 2013–14
- Champions: Austria Salzburg (West); LASK Linz (Central); FAC Wien (East)
- Promoted: FAC Wien; LASK Linz
- Relegated: Red Bull Salzburg II; Bregenz; Wals-Grünau; Wolfsberger AC II; Villacher SV; Kapfenberger SV II; Ober Grafendorg; Oberwart; Retz
- Matches: 720
- Goals: 2,421 (3.36 per match)

The 2013–14 season of the Regionalliga was the 55th season of the third-tier football league in Austria, since its establishment in 1959.

The league is composed of 48 teams divided into three groups of 16 teams each, whose teams are divided geographically (Eastern, Central and Western). Teams play only other teams in their own division.

== Regionalliga East ==
Pos	Team	Pld	W	D	L	GF	GA	GD	Pts	Qualification or relegation
1	FAC Wien (C, P)	30	20	4	6	55	24	+31	64	Qualification to promotion playoffs
2	Austria Wien II	30	17	6	7	55	34	+21	57	
3	Amstetten	30	17	5	8	63	29	+34	56	
4	Ritzing	30	16	5	9	47	36	+11	53	
5	Rapid Wien II	30	15	6	9	63	46	+17	51	
6	Sollenau	30	13	6	11	57	60	−3	45	
7	Mattersburg II	30	14	2	14	51	41	+10	44	
8	Stegersbach	30	12	6	12	43	46	−3	42	
9	Schwechat	30	11	8	11	44	48	−4	41	
10	Admira Wacker Mödling II	30	12	4	14	37	50	−13	40	
11	Wiener Sportklub	30	11	5	14	48	55	−7	38	
12	Neuberg	30	10	6	14	48	51	−3	36	
13	Wiener Viktoria	30	9	3	18	47	76	−29	30	
14	Ober Grafendorg (R)	30	7	8	15	37	61	−24	29	Relegation to Austrian Landesliga
15	Oberwart (R)	30	6	9	15	38	58	−20	27	Relegation to Austrian Landesliga
16	Retz (R)	30	6	5	19	36	54	−18	23	Relegation to Austrian Landesliga

Source: Standings
Rules for classification: 1) points; 2) goal difference; 3) number of goals scored.
(C) Champions; (P) Promoted; (R) Relegated

== Regionalliga Central ==
Pos	Team	Pld	W	D	L	GF	GA	GD	Pts	Qualification or relegation
1	LASK Linz (C, P)	30	24	4	2	80	19	+61	76	Qualification to promotion playoffs
2	Pasching	30	21	6	3	79	20	+59	69	
3	Lafnitz	30	17	4	9	68	55	+13	55	
4	Wallern	30	14	5	11	52	46	+6	47	
5	Austria Klagenfurt	30	13	5	12	56	68	−12	44	
6	Blau-Weiß Linz	30	13	3	14	40	52	−12	42	
7	Union St. Florian	30	11	8	11	36	36	0	41	
8	Sturm Graz II	30	11	8	11	54	55	−1	41	
9	Kalsdorf	30	11	6	13	53	55	−2	39	
10	Allerheiligen	30	10	7	13	49	46	+3	37	
11	Klagenfurt	30	11	4	15	57	65	−8	37	
12	Vorwärts Steyr	30	11	4	15	37	47	−10	37	
13	Vöcklamarkt	30	10	4	16	38	63	−25	34	
14	Wolfsberger AC II (R)	30	7	6	17	35	57	−22	27	Relegation to Austrian Landesliga
15	Villacher SV (R)	30	7	5	18	37	62	−25	26	Relegation to Austrian Landesliga
16	Kapfenberger SV II (R)	30	6	7	17	35	60	−25	25	Relegation to Austrian Landesliga

Source: Standings
Rules for classification: 1) points; 2) goal difference; 3) number of goals scored.
(C) Champions; (P) Promoted; (R) Relegated

== Regionalliga West ==
Pos	Team	Pld	W	D	L	GF	GA	GD	Pts	Qualification or relegation
1	Austria Salzburg (C)	30	25	4	1	96	15	+81	79	Qualification to promotion playoffs
2	Wattens	30	22	4	4	88	36	+52	70	
3	Neumarkt	30	16	5	9	67	41	+26	53	
4	St. Johann	30	15	2	13	59	57	+2	47	
5	Rheindorf Altach II	30	14	4	12	51	51	0	46	
6	Schwaz	30	13	6	11	45	42	+3	45	
7	Wacker Innsbruck II	30	12	4	14	51	61	−10	40	
8	Kufstein	30	9	9	12	49	58	−9	36	
9	Dornbirn 1913	30	8	10	12	50	51	−1	34	
10	Seekirchen 1945	30	8	10	12	44	48	−4	34	
11	Hard	30	10	4	16	38	65	−27	34	
12	Höchst	30	8	9	13	35	51	−16	33	
13	Eugendorf	30	9	6	15	44	69	−25	33	
14	Red Bull Salzburg II (R)	30	7	10	13	43	56	−13	31	Relegation to Austrian Landesliga
15	Bregenz (R)	30	8	5	17	50	75	−25	29	Relegation to Austrian Landesliga
16	Wals-Grünau (R)	30	7	6	17	36	70	−34	27	Relegation to Austrian Landesliga

Source: Standings
Rules for classification: 1) points; 2) goal difference; 3) number of goals scored.
(C) Champions; (R) Relegated
