= 2013–14 Austrian Football First League =

Austrian Football First League
- Season: 2013–14
- Promoted: Altach
- Relegated: Parndorf; First Vienna
- Matches: 180
- Goals: 538 (2.99 per match)
- Top goalscorer: Johannes Aigner (22 goals)

The 2013–14 Austrian Football First League was the 40th season of the Austrian second-level football league. It began on 19 July 2013 and ended on 5 June 2014.

== Teams and locations ==
Location of teams in the 2013–14 Austrian Football First League

Club Name	Stadium	Capacity
Austria Lustenau	Reichshofstadion	8,800
First Vienna	Hohe Warte Stadium	5,000
Hartberg	Stadion Hartberg	6,000
Horn	Sportplatz	3,000
Kapfenberger SV	Franz Fekete Stadium	12,000
Liefering	Red Bull Arena	31,895
Mattersburg	Untersberg-Arena	2,955
Parndorf	Heidebodenstadion	5,800
Rheindorf Altach	Cashpoint Arena	8,900
St. Pölten	Voith-Platz	10,000

== League table ==
Pos	Team	Pld	W	D	L	GF	GA	GD	Pts	Promotion or relegation
1	Rheindorf Altach (C, P)	36	21	10	5	79	41	+38	73	Promotion to 2014–15 Austrian Bundesliga
2	Austria Lustenau	36	16	11	9	57	36	+21	59	
3	Liefering	36	16	9	11	72	48	+24	57	Ineligible for promotion
4	St. Pölten	36	15	8	13	52	48	+4	53 (Note: Since the 2013–14 Austrian Cup winners FC Red Bull Salzburg qualified to the 2014–15 UEFA Champions League, runners-up St. Pölten took the 2014-15 UEFA Europa League second qualifying round spot.)	Qualification for the Europa League second qualifying round
5	Kapfenberger SV	36	16	4	16	55	48	+7	52	
6	Mattersburg	36	11	11	14	53	67	−14	44	
7	Horn	36	12	8	16	52	70	−18	44	
8	Hartberg	36	11	11	14	41	60	−19	44	
9	Parndorf 1919 (R)	36	11	6	19	41	59	−18	39	Qualification for the Relegation playoffs
10	First Vienna (R)	36	9	6	21	36	61	−25	20 (Note: First Vienna were deducted five points because of violations of licensing regulations and requirements. After an appeal, it was changed to three points. An additional 10 points were deducted on April 30.)	Relegation to 2014–15 Austrian Regionalliga

Source: Austrian Football First League
Rules for classification: 1) points; 2) goal difference; 3) number of goals scored.
(C) Champions; (P) Promoted; (R) Relegated

== Promotion/relegation playoffs ==
=== Teams ===
- Parndorf (finished 9th in First League)
- FAC Wien (champions of Regionalliga East)
- LASK Linz (champions of Regionalliga Central)
- Austria Salzburg (champions of Regionalliga West)

=== First leg ===
2 June 2014
16:00

FAC Wien	2 – 2	Austria Salzburg
Demic 63'; Pittnauer 68'		Vujic 40'; Rajic 90+2'

FAC-Platz, Wien
Attendance: 3,100
Referee: Manuel Schüttengruber

2 June 2014
16:30

Parndorf	0 – 1	LASK Linz
		Vujanovic 85'

Heidebodenstadion, Parndorf
Attendance: 3,000
Referee: Harald Lechner

=== Second leg ===
5 June 2014
15:00

Austria Salzburg	0 – 3	FAC Wien
		Panić 20'; Haas 50'; Pittnauer 62'

My Phone Austria Stadion, Salzburg
Attendance: 1,800
Referee: Robert Schörgenhofer

FAC Wien won 5–2 on aggregate and were promoted to the Austrian First League

5 June 2014
16:10

LASK Linz	1 – 1	Parndorf
Vujanovic 27' (pen.)		Silberbauer 29' (pen.)

Linzer Stadion, Linz
Attendance: 10,000
Referee: Alexander Harkam

LASK Linz won 2–1 on aggregate and were promoted to the Austrian First League
