= Kevin Fend =

Austrian footballer (born 1990)

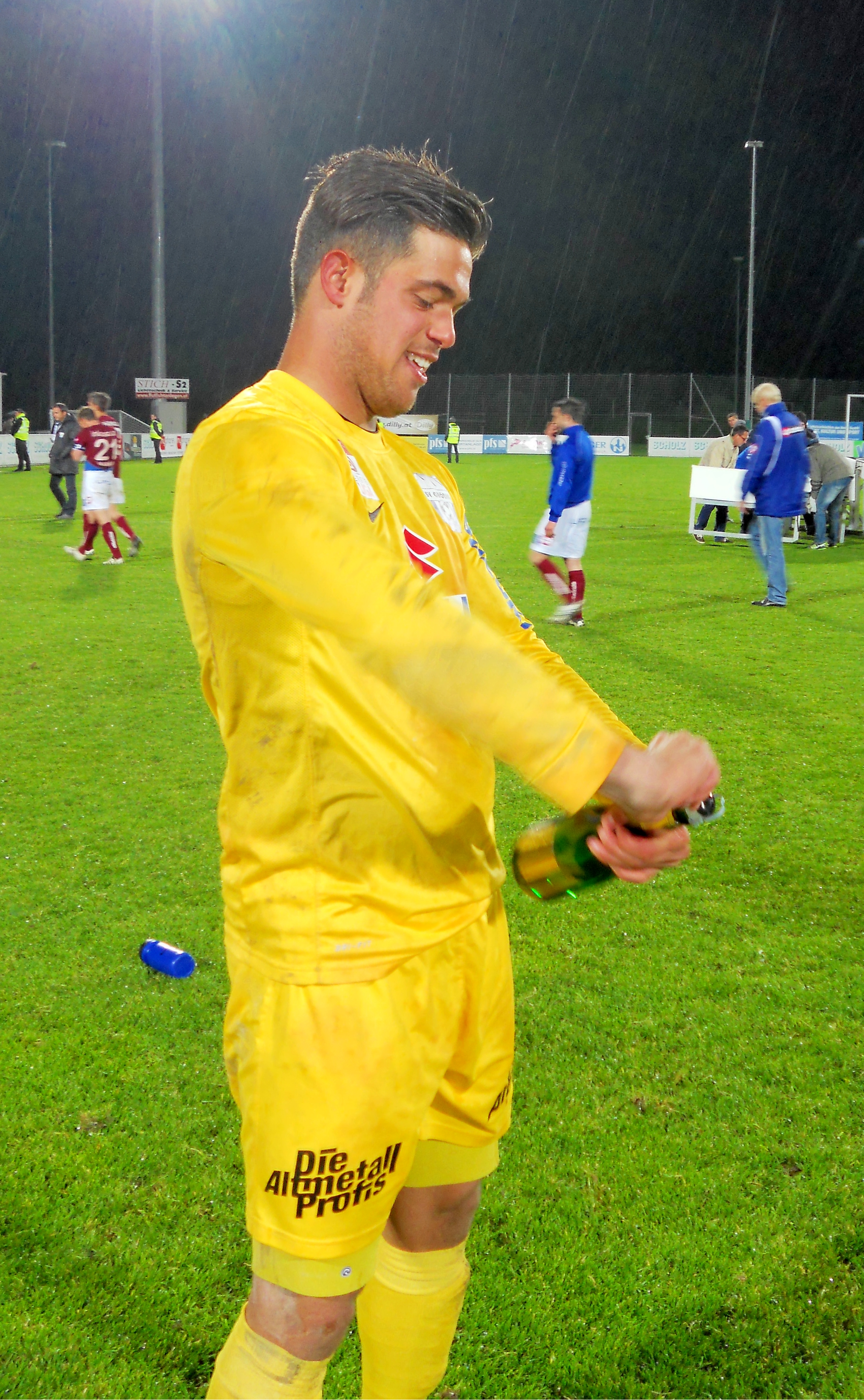
- Fend in 2013

Personal information
- Date of birth: 8 April 1990 (age 36)
- Place of birth: Hohenems, Austria
- Height: 1.82 m (6 ft 0 in)
- Position: Goalkeeper

Team information
- Current team: Dornbirner SV
- Number: 1

Senior career*
Years	Team	Apps	(Gls)
2005–2009	AKA Vorarlberg		
2009–2012	SC Rheindorf Altach	54	(0)
2012–2014	SV Grödig	56	(0)
2014–2015	SV Elversberg II	23	(0)
2015–2016	1. FC Sonthofen	56	(0)
2017–	Dornbirner SV	141	(0)
- * Club domestic league appearances and goals as of 20:11, 6 April 2023 (UTC)

Kevin Fend (born 8 April 1990) is an Austrian footballer who plays as a goalkeeper for Eliteliga Vorarlberg club Dornbirner SV.
