= St. Peter in der Au =

Sankt Peter in der Au
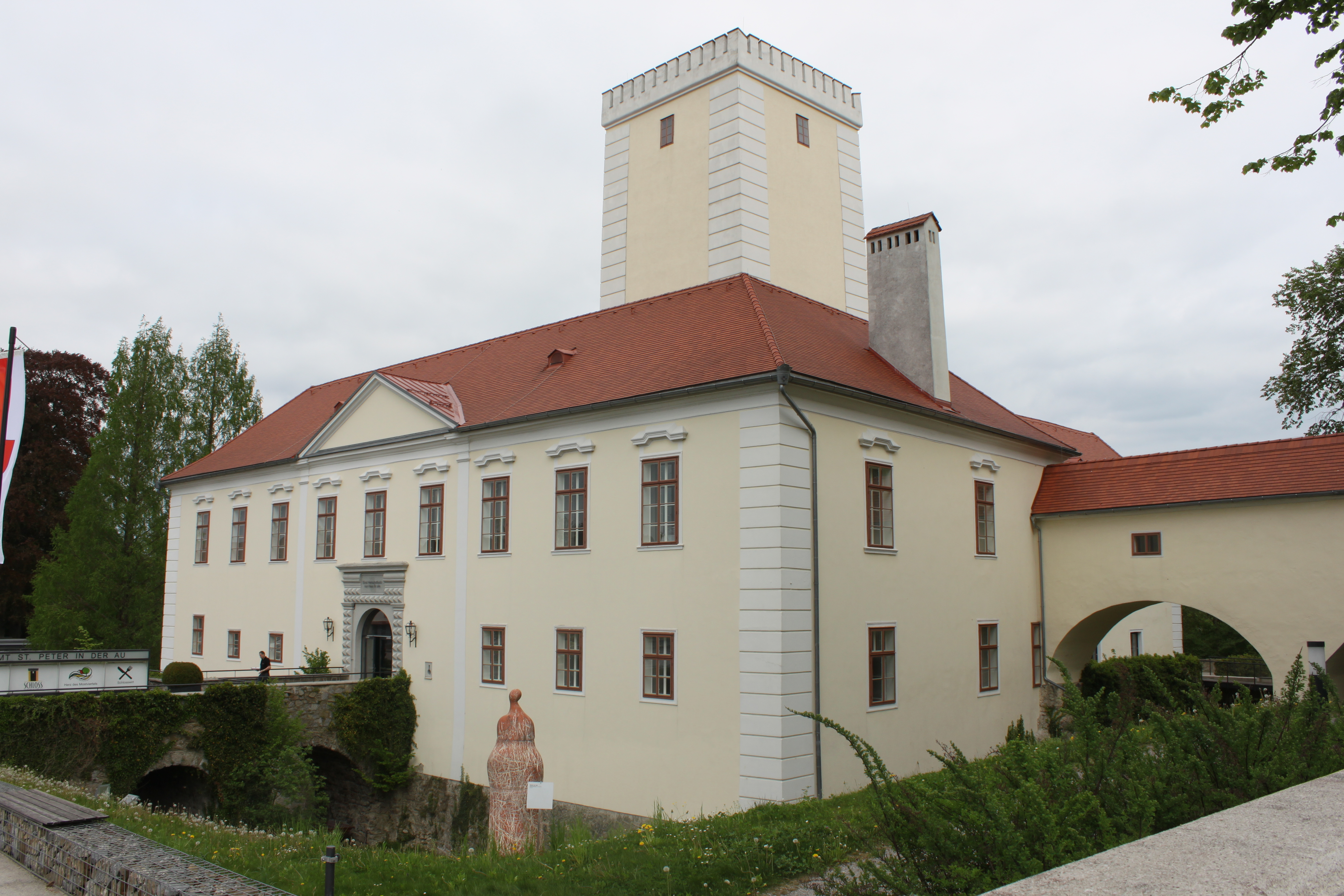
- Castle

- Coat of arms

- Location within Austria
- Coordinates: 48°3′N 14°37′E
- Country: Austria
- State: Lower Austria
- District: Amstetten

Government
  - Mayor: Johann Heuras

Area
  - Total: 59.94 km^{2} (23.14 sq mi)
- Elevation: 348 m (1,142 ft)

Population (2022-01-01)
  - Total: 5,176
  - Density: 86.35/km^{2} (223.7/sq mi)
- Time zone: UTC+1 (CET)
  - Summer (DST): UTC+2 (CEST)
- Postal code: 3352
- Area code: 07477
- Website: www.stpeterau.at

Sankt Peter in der Au is a town in the district of Amstetten in Lower Austria in Austria.

== Geography ==
Sankt Peter an der Au lies in the west part of the Mostviertel in Lower Austria.

== Sport ==
The local association football team is UFC Sankt Peter in der Au.
