= Gary Noël =

Mauritian footballer (born 1990)

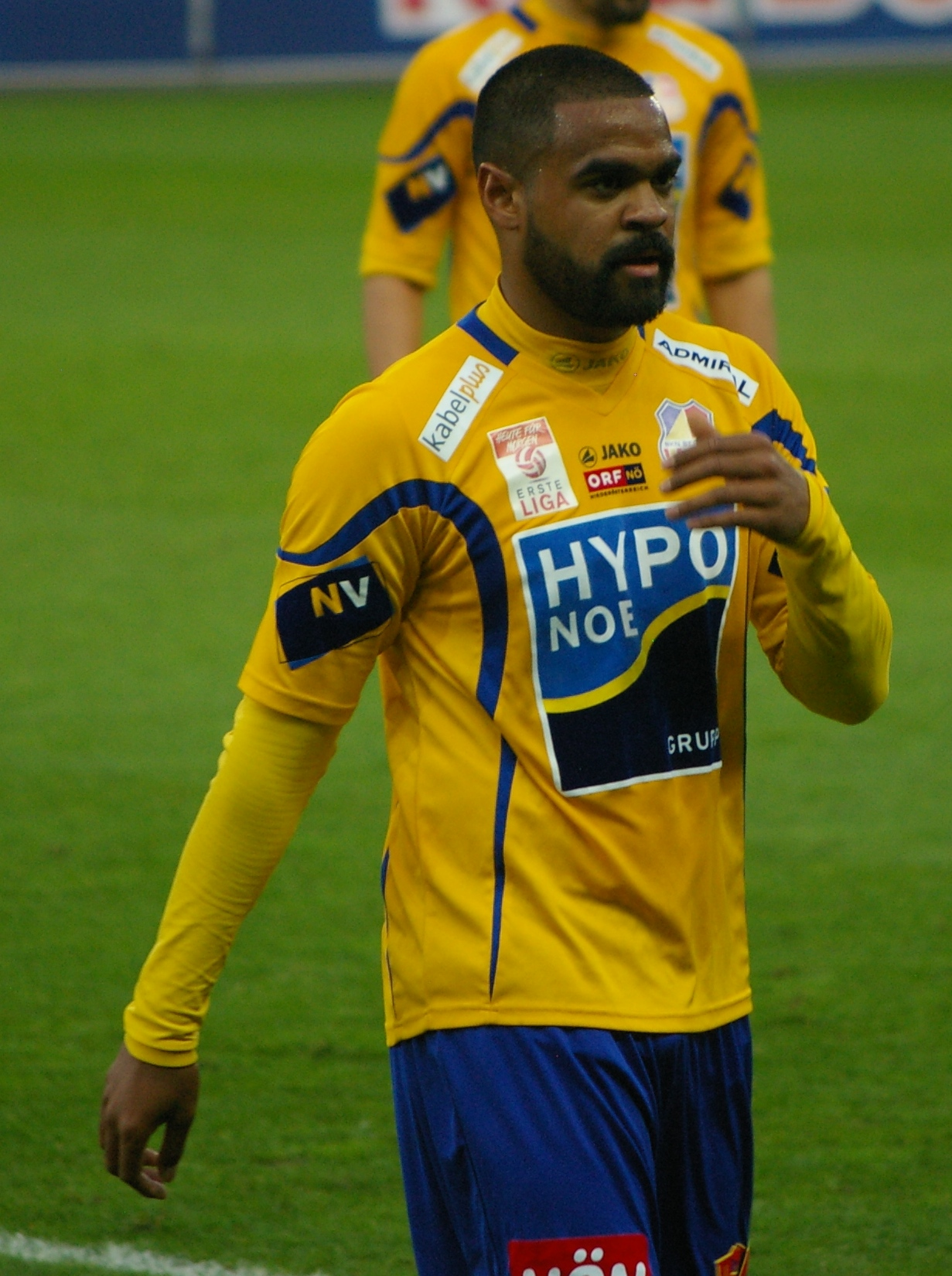
- Noël with SKN St. Pölten

Personal information
- Full name: Gary James George Noël
- Date of birth: 7 March 1990 (age 36)
- Place of birth: London, England
- Height: 1.80 m (5 ft 11 in)
- Position: Forward

Youth career
- –2008: Millwall

Senior career*
Years	Team	Apps	(Gls)
2008–2009	Dulwich Hamlet		
2009	Harrow Borough	22	(11)
2009–2010	Croydon Athletic		
2010	Thurrock	1	(0)
2010–2011	Carshalton Athletic		
2011	Lewes	17	(3)
2011–2012	Admira Wacker II	24	(3)
2012–2013	SV Schwechat	29	(20)
2013–2015	SKN St. Pölten	34	(8)
2014	SKN St. Pölten II	4	(5)
2015–2016	First Vienna FC	41	(18)
2016–2018	VfB Lübeck	52	(26)
2018–2019	SC Weiche Flensburg 08	17	(5)
2019	Alemannia Aachen	4	(0)
2019–2020	Rot-Weiß Koblenz	12	(1)
2020	Lewes	3	(0)

International career^{‡}
2016–	Mauritius	11	(0)
- * Club domestic league appearances and goals as of 10:23, 12 November 2020 (UTC) ‡ National team caps and goals as of 09:27, 16 November 2018 (UTC)

Gary James George Noël (born 7 March 1990) is a professional footballer who plays as a forward for Lewes. Born in England, he represents Mauritius at international level.

== Club career ==
Noel started his Millwall before playing in non-league football for Dulwich Hamlet, Thurrock and Lewes amongst others. He then moved to Austria to play for Admira Wacker but featured only for their second team in the Austrian Regionalliga. After a spell with SV Schwechat, Noel joined SKN St. Pölten in 2013 where he went on to score in the final of the 2013–14 Austrian Cup final. He then joined First Vienna FC before moving to Germany to join Regionalliga side VfB Lübeck. After two seasons with Lübeck, Noël joined fellow Regionalliga Nord side SC Weiche Flensburg 08.

On 22 June 2019, Alemannia Aachen announced the signing of Noël on a one-year contract. He left the club two months later to join TuS Rot-Weiß Koblenz. However, he was released on 31 January 2020.

Noël returned to Lewes in February 2020.

== International career ==
Noel is eligible to represent Mauritius through his parentage, his father was born on the African island. He made his international debut against Rwanda on 26 March 2016.
