= Eliteliga Vorarlberg =

- Founded: 2019
- Country: Austria
- Number of clubs: 14
- Level on pyramid: 4
- Promotion to: Austrian Regionalliga West
- Relegation to: Vorarlbergliga
- Domestic cup: Austrian Cup
- International cup: VFV Cup
- Current champions: FC Lustenau 07 (2024-25)
- Current: 2025–26

The Eliteliga Vorarlberg is a fourth-tier division of Austrian football introduced in the 2019–20 season as one of the successor of the Austrian Regionalliga West. It covers the Austrian state of Vorarlberg and is one of nine leagues at this level.

== 2019–20 reformation ==
Due to high travel costs, the Vorarlberg and Tyrol clubs decide to leave the Austrian Regionalliga West and form their own Elite ligas, forcing Salzburg to do so as well. The Eliteliga were divided in a Regionalliga Salzburg, Regionalliga Tirol and Eliteliga Vorarlberg in the fall with 10 clubs each. The two best teams of these three regional leagues play in an Eliteliga play-off for promotion to the 2nd league.

Due to the COVID-19 pandemic, the 2020-21 season was halted in October 2020 with VfB Hohenems leading the pack before FC Lauterach. It was planned to resume in March 2021.

Starting from the 2023-24 season, the Regionalliga West was brought back after a 5 year hiatus. The Eliteliga Vorarlberg however, was kept in state, now becoming the fourth tier of Austrian football.

== 2025–26 member clubs ==
- SC Admira Dornbirn
- SC Austria Lustenau Amateure
- FC Bizau
- FC Blau-Weiß Feldkirch
- Dornbirner SV
- FC Egg
- SC Göfis
- FC Hard
- SV Lochau
- SV Ludesch
- FC Nenzing
- FC Rotenberg
- SC Röthis
- FC Wolfurt
Location of teams in 2025-26 Eliteliga Vorarlberg

== Table ==
Pos	Team	Pld	W	D	L	GF	GA	GD	Pts	Promotion, qualification or relegation
1	Röthis	13	9	2	2	33	13	+20	29	Promotion to Regionalliga West
2	Admira Dornbirn	13	8	3	2	34	21	+13	27	Promotion to Regionalliga West
3	Wolfurt	13	8	0	5	24	18	+6	24	Promotion to Regionalliga West
4	Ludesch	13	6	3	4	19	15	+4	21	
5	Hard	13	6	1	6	15	16	−1	19	
6	Dornbirner SV	12	4	6	2	26	11	+15	18	
7	Nenzing	13	5	3	5	24	30	−6	18	
8	Lochau	13	5	2	6	17	19	−2	17	
9	BW Feldkirch	13	5	2	6	20	30	−10	17	
10	Austria Lustenau Ama.	13	5	2	6	25	24	+1	17	
11	Egg	12	5	1	6	17	18	−1	16	
12	Bizau	13	3	4	6	20	27	−7	13	
13	Rotenberg	13	3	4	6	18	27	−9	13	
14	Göfis	13	0	3	10	14	37	−23	3	Relegation to Vorarlbergliga

Updated to match(es) played on 15 March 2026. Source:
Rules for classification: 1) Points; 2) Head-to-head Points; 3) Head-to-head goal difference; 4) Head-to-head goals scored; 5) Goal difference; 6) Goals scored; 7) Away goals scored; 8) Draw.

== Results ==
Home \ Away	ADM	ALA	BIZ	BWF	DSV	EGG	GÖF	HAR	LOC	LUD	NEN	RBG	RÖT	WOL
Admira	—	2–1	16 May	5–0	1–1	1 May	5–2	6 Jun	3–2	2–2	3–3	18 Apr	28 Mar	30 May
Austria L. Ama.	4 Apr	—	2–2	0–3	0–5	29 May	15 May	5–1	1–2	18 Apr	5–0	30 Apr	13 Jun	3–2
Bizau	1–3	28 Mar	—	13 Jun	1–1	4–2	3 Jun	24 Apr	3–1	22 May	2–3	1–1	9 May	12 Apr
BW Feldkirch	9 May	6 Jun	1–1	—	28 Mar	3 Jun	4–3	18 Apr	25 Apr	1–0	11 Apr	23 May	1–1	0–2
Dornbirner SV	23 May	12 Apr	4 Apr	8–1	—	13 Jun	2–2	1–0	9 May	1–2	26 Apr	4 Jun	1–1	0–1
Egg	2–3	1–0	6 Jun	1–3	21 Mar	—	22 May	11 Apr	3–1	10 May	2–2	0–1	25 Apr	29 Mar
Göfis	26 Apr	3–3	0–1	30 May	6 Jun	1–2	—	0–0	11 Apr	0–4	28 Mar	9 May	1–7	1–3
Hard	1–3	23 May	1–0	3–0	2 May	0–2	4 Apr	—	2–0	13 Jun	16 May	2–0	3 Jun	3–0
Lochau	13 Jun	3 Jun	1 May	1–0	0–0	18 Apr	1–0	30 May	—	2–3	3–1	4 Apr	1–2	14 May
Ludesch	11 Apr	0–2	2–1	16 May	30 May	2–1	2 May	0–1	28 Mar	—	6 Jun	2–2	1–2	1–0
Nenzing	3 Jun	10 May	19 Apr	3–0	0–4	4 Apr	3–1	2–0	22 May	0–0	—	13 Jun	0–2	3 May
Rotenberg	1–3	1–3	30 May	2–6	2–2	16 May	2–0	29 Mar	0–0	25 Apr	2–5	—	11 Apr	6 Jun
Röthis	3–1	2–0	6–2	3 May	17 May	0–1	19 Apr	3–1	6 Jun	4 Apr	31 May	3–1	—	1–2
Wolfurt	2–0	25 Apr	4–1	4 Apr	19 Apr	1–0	13 Jun	10 May	1–3	4 Jun	6–2	0–3	23 May	—

Updated to match(es) played on 15 March 2026. Source:
Legend: Blue = home team win; Yellow = draw; Red = away team win.
