= Jannick Schibany =

Austrian footballer

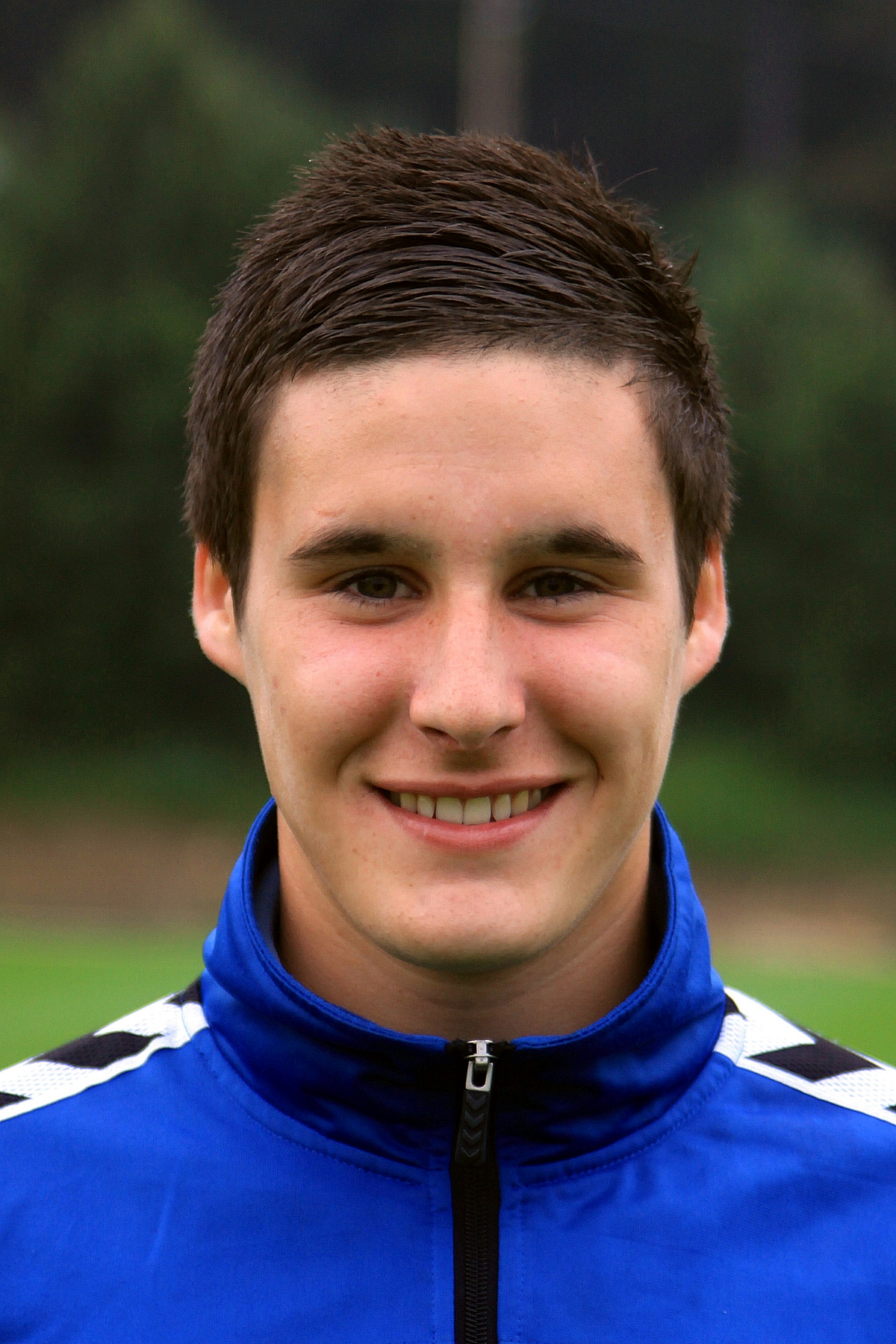

Personal information
- Date of birth: 26 April 1993 (age 33)
- Place of birth: Zwettl, Austria
- Height: 1.76 m (5 ft 9 1/2 in)
- Position: Forward

Team information
- Current team: First Vienna FC
- Number: 9

Youth career
- 2001–2006: ASV Gutenbrunn
- 2006–2010: SKN St. Pölten

Senior career*
Years	Team	Apps	(Gls)
2010–	SKN St. Pölten II	18	(3)
2010–2016	SKN St. Pölten	114	(16)
2016–	First Vienna FC	14	(10)

International career^{‡}
2008–2009	Austria U-16	4	(0)
2009	Austria U-17	5	(0)
2010	Austria U-18	1	(0)
2011	Austria U-19	2	(0)
- * Club domestic league appearances and goals as of 16 December 2016 (UTC) ‡ National team caps and goals as of 26 May 2016 (UTC)

Jannick Schibany (born 26 April 1993) is an Austrian footballer who currently plays for First Vienna FC.
