= SV Gmunden =

Austrian football club

- Full name: Sportverein Gmunden
- Founded: 8 July 1921; 103 years ago
- Ground: LSP Arena Gmunden, Gmunden
- Capacity: 1,700
- President: Gerhard Riedl
- Manager: Christoph Mamoser
- League: OÖ Liga
- 2023–24: Landesliga West, 1st of 15 (promoted)
- Website: svg1921.at

Sportverein Gmunden, called SV Gmunder Milch for sponsorship reasons, is an Austrian association football based in Gmunden, Upper Austria. The club is affiliated to the Upper Austrian Football Association and are competing in the OÖ Liga, one of the fourth tiers of Austrian football.

== History ==
SV Gmunden was originally founded as Gmundner Fußball-Klub on 8 July 1921, and was officially re-established in 1945. Early matches were held in the Duke of Cumberland's park, with the club's first colours being black and green. Under Major Friedrich Butala's leadership, the club aimed to promote football locally, notably hosting a friendly match against Bayern Munich's reserve team, which ended in a 3–1 defeat for Gmunden. By 1923, the club, coached by Otto Fischer, entered the 2. Klasse of the OÖ Liga.

During the 1930s, SV Gmunden gained prominence, reaching the Upper Austrian Cup final in 1936 as a second-tier team, although they lost to SK Admira Linz 3–2. After World War II, the club re-formed as Sportverein Gmunden and attracted over 5,000 fans to a 1946 match against Rapid Wien, securing a spot in the Austrian Landesliga by 1948.

The 1950s brought financial difficulties, which were addressed under club president Josef Swoboda, leading to stabilisation and the club's first youth championship. Throughout the 1960s and 1970s, SV Gmunden enhanced its local reputation through regional derbies and occasional participation in the Landesliga.

The 1980s were marked by success, aided by sponsor Höller-Eisen and club leader Walter Huemer. The club won the Upper Austrian Cup in 1981 and the third-tier Landesliga Oberösterreich title in 1983, establishing itself competitively. A significant moment during this era occurred in the Austrian Cup on 26 October 1982, when SV Gmunden, playing against Austrian Bundesliga team SK Austria Klagenfurt at Gmunden Alpenstadion, achieved a 2–1 victory, with goals from Robert Kain and Jürgen Silmbroth. This victory allowed the club to advance to the quarter-finals, where they faced VÖEST Linz and were defeated 5–1.

In the 1990s, under club president Ferdinand Stadlmayr, the club finished as runner-up in 1994, leading to promotion to the Landesliga. The 2000s saw the introduction of the Gmundner Milch as a main sponsor, rebranding the club as SV Gmundner Milch, and culminated in an OÖ Liga title in the 2006–07 season, along with participation in the Regionalliga in 2007–08.

Throughout the 2010s, SV Gmunden faced financial instability and fluctuating league performance, resulting in relegation battles. Nevertheless, the club maintained its position in regional football. In 2021, SV Gmunden celebrated its 100th anniversary. In April 2024, Gmunden won the Landesliga West, and reached promotion to the OÖ Liga.

== Honours ==
- Landesliga Oberösterreich (level 3)
  - Winners: 1982–83
- OÖ Liga (level 4)
  - Winners: 2006–07
- Landesliga West (level 5)
  - Winners: 2023–24
