= Patrick Kostner =

Austrian footballer (born 1988)

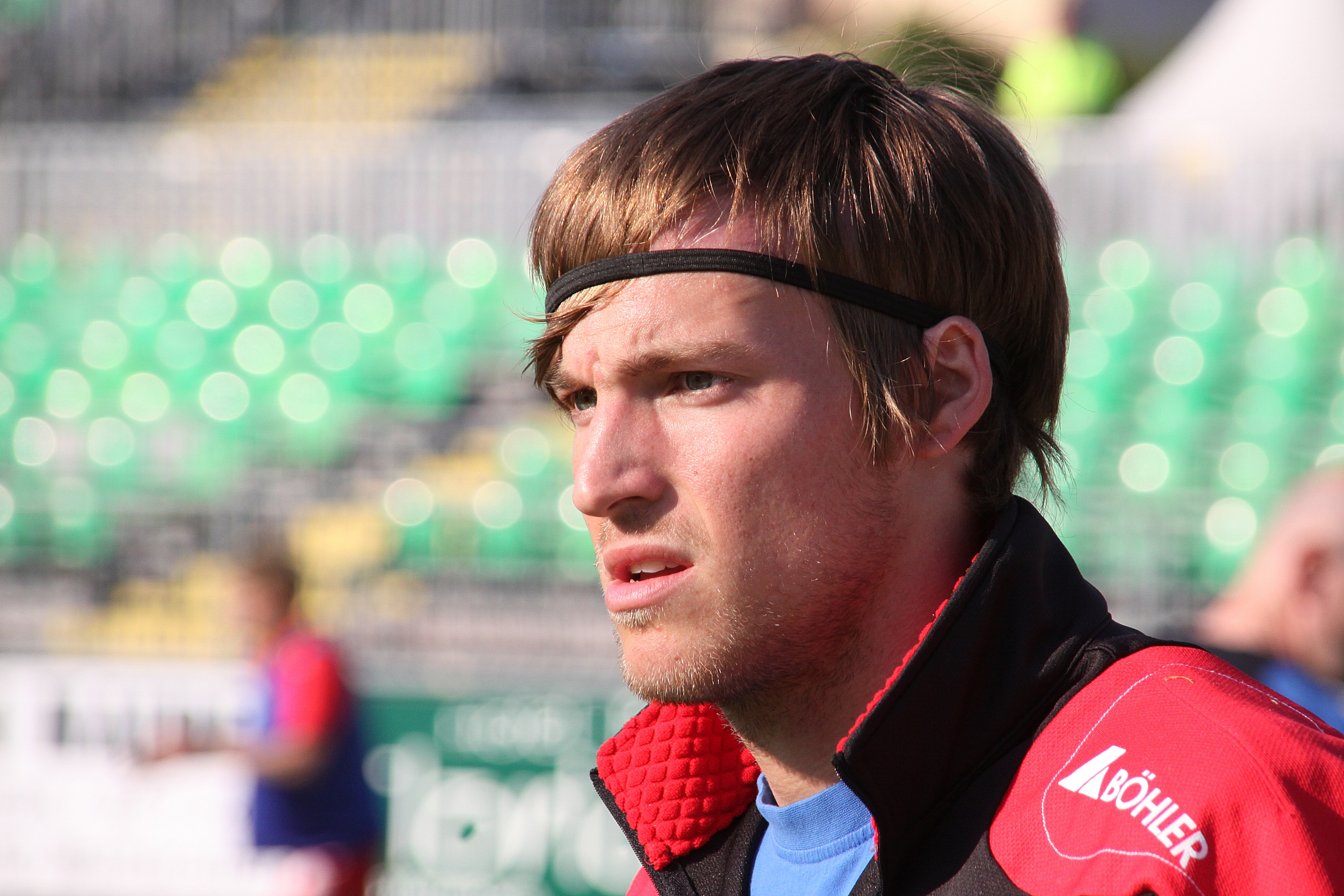

Personal information
- Date of birth: 28 February 1988 (age 38)
- Place of birth: Vienna, Austria
- Height: 1.85 m (6 ft 1 in)
- Position: Goalkeeper

Team information
- Current team: First Vienna FC
- Number: 1

Senior career*
Years	Team	Apps	(Gls)
2010–2013	Kapfenberger SV	23	(0)
2013–2016	SKN St. Pölten	12	(0)
2013–2016	SKN St. Pölten II	12	(0)
2016–	First Vienna FC	13	(0)
- * Club domestic league appearances and goals as of 16 December 2016

Patrick Kostner (born 28 February 1988) is an Austrian footballer who plays for First Vienna FC.
