= 1. Niederösterreichische Landesliga =

1. Landesliga
- Organising body: Lower Austrian Football Association (NÖFV)
- First season: 1913; 113 years ago
- Country: Austria
- Confederation: UEFA
- Number of clubs: 16
- Level on pyramid: Level 4
- Promotion to: Regionalliga East
- Relegation to: 2. Landesliga Ost; 2. Landesliga West
- Domestic cup: Austrian Cup
- Current champions: USV Scheiblingkirchen-Warth (2025–26)
- Most championships: 1. Wiener Neustädter SC; Kremser SC (7 titles)
- Website: https://www.noefv.at/

The 1. Landesliga, historically the 1. Niederösterreichische Landesliga, is a men's football league in Austria and the highest division run by the Lower Austrian Football Association (NÖFV). It is one of nine Landesligen that together form the fourth level of the Austrian football league system. Sixteen clubs contest it over 30 matchdays, and the champion is promoted to the Regionalliga East.

A provincial championship for clubs outside Vienna was first played in 1913–14 and won by Germania Schwechat. Until 1922 the Austrian championship itself was organised by the Lower Austrian federation and restricted to Viennese clubs, so the national champions also held the title of Meister von Niederösterreich. The division has since occupied the second, third and fourth levels of the national pyramid at different times.

1. Wiener Neustädter SC and Kremser SC share the record with seven titles each. USV Scheiblingkirchen-Warth are the reigning champions, having won in 2025–26 for the second time in five seasons.

== Format ==
The sixteen clubs play each other home and away, giving each a 30 match season. The club top of the table at the end is champion and is promoted to the Regionalliga East, alongside the champions of the Wiener Stadtliga and the Landesliga Burgenland, the corresponding divisions of the other two associations in that region.

Relegation is to the 2. Landesliga Ost or the 2. Landesliga West according to the geographical position of the club, and the champions of those two divisions come up in exchange. The number of clubs relegated varies from season to season, depending on how many Lower Austrian clubs come down from the Regionalliga East.

== History ==
=== Provincial championship (1913–1922) ===
A championship for clubs from the province outside Vienna was staged for the first time in 1913–14. Entrants were divided into a southern and a northern group, and the two winners met in a final. Germania Schwechat beat SV Stockerau 07 by 7–1 at home and drew 2–2 away to take the title.

The First World War interrupted the competition almost immediately. No championship was completed in 1914–15 or between 1917 and 1919, and play resumed properly only in 1919–20. Vienna separated from Lower Austria in 1922, and from that point the state championship stood on its own.

=== State championship (1922–1938) ===
Regular state championships were played from 1922–23 under the name 1. Klasse Niederösterreich. From 1929 the winner was entitled to enter the Austrian amateur championship, which ran until 1937. 1. Wiener Neustädter SC dominated the period with five titles, and Kremser SC took three.

=== Niederdonau (1938–1945) ===
The Anschluss of 1938 brought Austrian football into the German system. The state was renamed Niederdonau and its championship became a feeder to the Gauliga Ostmark. ESV Wacker Wiener Neustadt went up to the top level in 1938, and LSV Markersdorf did so in 1943 after two consecutive titles. The 1944–45 season was abandoned with the championship split into northern and southern groups, and no title was awarded.

=== Second and third level (1945–1974) ===
The division resumed after the war as the Landesliga Niederösterreich and served as a second level competition for Lower Austrian clubs, although promotion to the national championship was not possible for most of that time. SV Gloggnitz went up to the top flight in 1949 and 1. Wiener Neustädter SC followed a year later.

The introduction of the Staatsliga B in 1950 pushed the Landesliga down to the third level. It stayed there when the Staatsliga B was renamed the Regionalliga Ost in 1959–60 and confined to clubs from Vienna, Lower Austria and Burgenland.

=== Fourth level and the 1980s interruption ===
The creation of the Bundesliga in 1974–75 added a division above the existing pyramid and made the Landesliga the fourth level. That lasted six years. The Regionalliga East was abolished in 1980, restoring the Landesliga to the third level, and the champions of Lower Austria, Vienna and Burgenland contested a promotion play-off instead. The Regionalliga East returned in the mid 1980s and the Landesliga has been the fourth level ever since.

No champions were declared in 2019–20 or 2020–21. The Austrian Football Association abandoned all amateur divisions in April 2020 because of the COVID-19 pandemic, and the Lower Austrian association did the same a year later.

Two clubs account for much of the division's recent continuity. SV Langenrohr have played in it without interruption since the early 1990s, the longest current run of any club, and SC Retz have belonged to it since 1994, interrupted by two spells in the Regionalliga.

== Names and sponsorship ==
The competition has carried several names.

- Landesmeisterschaft Niederösterreich, 1913–14 to 1921–22
- 1. Klasse Niederösterreich, 1922–23 to 1936–37
- Niederdonau and Bezirksklasse Ost, 1937–38 to 1944–45
- Landesliga Niederösterreich, 1945–46 to 1994–95
- 1. Landesliga Niederösterreich, since 1995–96

A title sponsor has appeared in the name since 1995. The division was the 1. NÖN Landesliga from 1995–96 to 2017–18, after the newspaper Niederösterreichische Nachrichten, ran without a sponsor from 2018–19 to 2021–22, and has been the 11teamsports 1. Landesliga since 2022–23.

== Champions ==
Champions by club
Club	Titles	Winning seasons
1. Wiener Neustädter SC	7	1922–23, 1923–25, (Note: The 1923–25 competition ran over two calendar years and finished in January 1925.) 1925–26, 1935–36, 1936–37, 1945–46, 1949–50
Kremser SC	7	1929–30, 1930–31, 1932–33, 1953–54, 1973–74, 1982–83, 2000–01
Badener AC	6	1931–32, 1934–35, 1943–44, 1965–66, 1971–72, 1981–82
SV Stockerau	4	1920–21, 1969–70, 1980–81, 1985–86
Mödling (Note: Recorded variously as SV Mödling, VfB Union Mödling and VfB Mödling.)	4	1927–28, 1928–29, 1947–48, 1984–85
SV Gloggnitz	3	1948–49, 1960–61, 2023–24
SV Horn	3	1990–91, 1997–98, 2006–07
KSV Ortmann	3	1952–53, 1955–56, 1957–58
ASK Ternitz	3	1950–51, 1959–60, 1961–62
SKU Amstetten	2	2007–08, 2010–11
ASK Bruck/Leitha	2	1987–88, 2016–17
SC Brunn	2	1966–67, 1976–77
Germania Schwechat	2	1913–14, 1916
SC Harland	2	1946–47, 1954–55
LSV Markersdorf	2	1941–42, 1942–43
WSV BU Neunkirchen	2	1938–39, 1939–40
SC Retz	2	2011–12, 2024–25
USV Scheiblingkirchen-Warth	2	2021–22, 2025–26
SC St. Pölten (Note: Recorded as 1. St. Pöltener SC in 1926–27.)	2	1926–27, 1933–34
SKN St. Pölten	2	2001–02, 2013–14 (Note: Won by the club's reserve side.)
SC Untersiebenbrunn	2	1978–79, 1995–96
FC Waidhofen/Ybbs	2	1975–76, 1992–93
SV Würmla	2	1996–97, 2003–04
SC Zwettl	2	1998–99, 2004–05
Admira Wacker Mödling II	1	2002–03
Ardagger/Viehdorf	1	2022–23
BSV Enzesfeld-Hirtenberg	1	1968–69
KSV Böhlerwerk	1	1974–75
ASK Ebreichsdorf	1	2014–15
ASK Eggendorf	1	1972–73
SG Eichgraben/Gablitz	1	1983–84
EPSV Gmünd	1	1989–90
SC Günselsdorf	1	1962–63
SV Gaflenz	1	2008–09
TSV Hainburg	1	1956–57
SC Himberg	1	1993–94
ASV Hohenau	1	1991–92
SV Hundsheim	1	1999–2000
SV Korneuburg	1	1921–22
ASK Kottingbrunn	1	1994–95
SC Laa an der Thaya	1	1977–78
SV Leobendorf	1	2017–18
ASK Liesing	1	1919–20
SC Mannsdorf	1	2015–16
SC Marchegg	1	1963–64
SC Neunkirchen	1	1979–80
ATSV Ober-Grafendorf	1	2012–13
ASK Schwadorf	1	2005–06
SC Siebenhirten	1	1951–52
1. SC Sollenau	1	2009–10
SV Stripfing	1	2018–19
SV Admira Wiener Neustadt	1	1970–71
BSG Traisen	1	1940–41
SV Traiskirchen	1	1967–68
SC Tulln	1	1964–65
FC Voith St. Pölten	1	1958–59
ESV Wacker Wiener Neustadt	1	1937–38
1. Wiener Neudorfer SVg	1	1986–87
ASK Ybbs	1	1988–89

Source, except where noted:

No championship was completed in 1914–15, from 1917 to 1919, in 1944–45, or in 2019–20 and 2020–21.

== See also ==
- Austrian Landesliga
- Austrian football league system
