= Peter Brandl (footballer) =

Austrian footballer

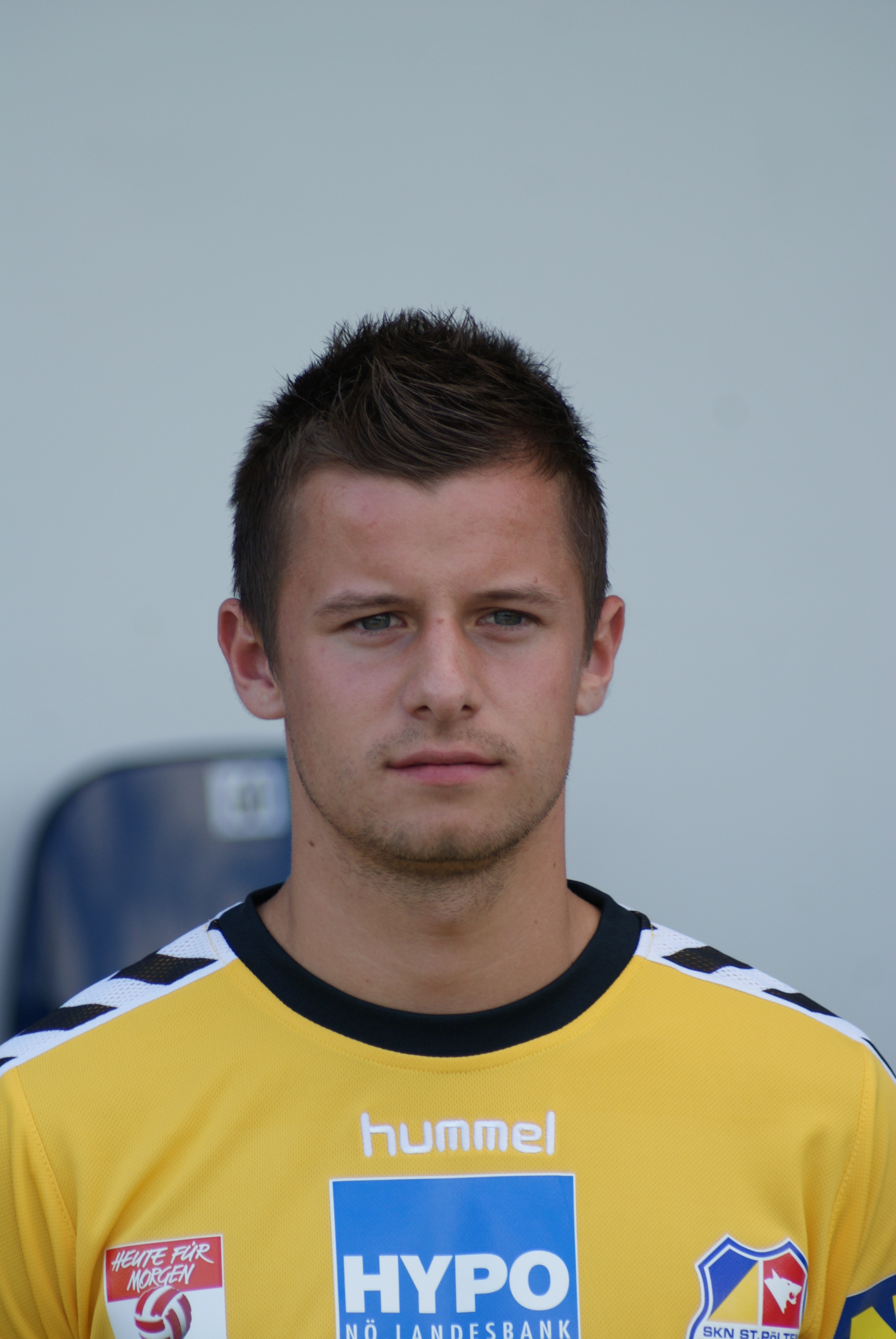

Personal information
- Date of birth: 17 July 1988 (age 38)
- Place of birth: Krems an der Donau, Austria
- Height: 1.69 m (5 ft 6 1/2 in)
- Position: Defensive midfielder

Team information
- Current team: SV Bergern

Youth career
- 1996–2003: UFC Unterwart ab August 1999
- 2003–2007: SKN St. Pölten II

Senior career*
Years	Team	Apps	(Gls)
2007–2017	SKN St. Pölten	176	(6)
2018–	SV Bergern	0	(0)
- * Club domestic league appearances and goals as of 28 May 2017

Peter Brandl (born 17 July 1988) is an Austrian footballer who currently plays for SV Bergern.
