= Osman Bozkurt =

Austrian footballer

Personal information
- Date of birth: 10 August 1984 (age 42)
- Place of birth: Feldkirch, Austria
- Height: 1.83 m (6 ft 0 in)
- Position: Forward

Team information
- Current team: ATSV Hollabrunn
- Number: 9

Youth career
- 1991–1998: SK Brederis
- 1998–2003: AKA Vorarlberg

Senior career*
Years	Team	Apps	(Gls)
2003–2005	Austria Lustenau	56	(11)
2005–2006	Admira Wacker	5	(1)
2006–2007	Wiener SC	26	(15)
2007–2010	First Vienna	56	(38)
2010–2011	Karşıyaka	19	(5)
2011–2012	Akhisarspor	26	(5)
2012–2013	Denizlispor	6	(0)
2013	Wiener Neustadt	9	(0)
2013–2014	St. Pölten	25	(6)
2014–2015	Horn	21	(4)
2015–2016	First Vienna	23	(15)
2016–2017	FC Stadlau	14	(6)
2017–2018	Mauerwerk	11	(1)
2018–2020	Neusiedl am See	44	(29)
2020–2021	Wiener Neustadt	13	(3)
2022–	ATSV Hollabrunn	0	(0)
- * Club domestic league appearances and goals as of 21:29, 7 March 2023 (UTC)

Osman Bozkurt (born 10 August 1984) is an Austrian footballer who currently plays for ATSV Hollabrunn.
