= Wiener Stadtliga =

- Country: Austria
- Confederation: Austrian Football Association
- Number of clubs: 16
- Level on pyramid: 4
- Promotion to: Austrian Regional League East
- Relegation to: 2. Landesliga Wien
- Current champions: Favoritner AC (2022–23)
- Website: http://wiener-fussball.at/

The Wiener Stadtliga is an Austrian Landesliga conference, one of the fourth-highest soccer leagues in Austrian football.

== Mode ==
In the Wiener Stadtliga, a total of 16 football clubs from Vienna and the neighboring province of Lower Austria participate. All clubs are members of the Vienna Football Association. The champion of Wiener Stadtliga rises directly in the third-highest division of Austria, the Austrian Regional League East. In addition to the champion of the Wiener Stadtliga, also the champions of Landesliga Burgenland and 1. Niederösterreichische Landesliga are promoted to the Regional League East. Below the Wiener Stadtliga, there are the 2. Landesliga as fifth-highest division followed by Oberliga A and Oberliga B as sixth-highest division, as well as the 1. Klasse A and 1. Klasse B as the seventh-highest divisions for Viennese clubs followed by the 2. Klasse A.

== 2023–24 member clubs ==
- ASV 13
- FV Austria XIII
- SV Dinamo Helfort
- SV Donau
- SV Gerasdorf Stammersdorf
- FC Hellas Kagran
- SC Mannswörth
- Sportunion Mauer
- Red Star Penzing
- SV Schwechat
- 1. Simmeringer SC
- SK Slovan-Hütteldorfer AC
- FC Stadlau
- WAF Vorwärts Brigittenau
- FC 1980 Wien
- SV Wienerberg 1921
Location of teams in 2023–24 Wiener Stadtliga
