= Sparkasse Horn Arena =

Football stadium

- Interactive map of Sparkasse Horn Arena
- Former names: Sportanlage Horn, SV Horn Arena, Waldviertler Volksbank Arena
- Location: Horn, Austria
- Coordinates: 48.6704°N 15.6635°E
- Capacity: 4000
- Surface: Grass

Construction
- Opened: 1958
- Renovated: 1997, 2007, 2010, 2011

Tenant
- SV Horn

The Sparkasse Horn Arena is a football stadium in the municipality of Horn in the state of Lower Austria. It is the home ground of SV Horn, which is currently playing in the 2nd division.

== History ==
The stadium was built in 1958 under the name Sportanlage Horn, and later renamed SV Horn Arena. In the 1970s a floodlight system and a grandstand were built. In 1997 the clubhouse was built. Further conversions and extensions took place in 2007, 2010 and 2011/12 in connection with the promotion of SV Horn to the second division.

In 2012 the name was changed to Waldviertler Volksbank Arena. In addition to the V.I.P. area, the stadium has 1,000 covered seats, 500 covered standing places and 2,100 additional standing places. In February 2020 the stadium was named Sparkasse Horn Arena.
