= UFC Sankt Peter in der Au =

- Full name: Union Fussball Club Sankt Peter an der Au
- Short name: UFC St. Peter/Au
- Founded: 1946
- Ground: Sportanlage St. Peter, St. Peter in der Au, Austria
- Capacity: 1000
- President: Herbert Stöger
- Chairman: Stefan Breitenberger
- Sporting director: Andreas Döcker
- Coach: Adnan Kaltak
- League: 2. Landesliga Niederösterreich Ost (V)
- Website: http://www.ufc-stpeter.at/
Home colours	Away colours

UFC Sankt Peter in der Au is an Austrian association football club from St. Peter in der Au, founded in 1946.

The club plays its home games on the sports field in St. Peter in der Au, which was completely renovated in 2018. There has always been a rivalry with USC Seitenstetten from the neighboring community to the east, with the derby attracting thousands of fans. The club's biggest success to date was reaching the 1st round of the 1998–99 Austrian Cup, losing 1–5 to SV Würmla.
