= SC/ESV Parndorf 1919 =

SC/ESV Parndorf
- Full name: SC/ESV Parndorf 1919
- Founded: 1919 as SC Parndorf; 1988 by merger
- Ground: Heidebodenstadion
- Capacity: 5,000
- League: Regionalliga East
- 2025–26: Regionalliga East, 2nd of 17
Home colours	Away colours

SC/ESV Parndorf 1919 is an Austrian football club based in Parndorf in northern Burgenland. It plays its home matches at the 5,000-capacity Heidebodenstadion and competes in the Regionalliga East, the third tier of the Austrian football league system. The club in its present form dates from 1988, when SC Parndorf and ESV Parndorf agreed to merge, though it carries the founding year of the older of the two in its name.

Parndorf has won the Regionalliga East four times, in 2003–04, 2005–06, 2010–11 and 2012–13, more than any other club in the division's third-tier era. Those titles brought only two seasons in the second tier, in 2006–07 and 2007–08, and one further season in 2013–14, because the club repeatedly lost the play-offs that stood between it and promotion. Of six such ties in its history it has won one.

== History ==
=== Merger and early years ===
The first joint general assembly of SC Parndorf and ESV Parndorf was held on 29 April 1988, at which the merger of the two clubs was agreed. After two seasons in the fourth-tier Landesliga the merged club was relegated to the fifth-tier 2. Liga Nord, returning to the top division of Burgenland football in 1992–93. It contended for promotion to the Regionalliga East repeatedly over the following decade without achieving it.

That changed in 2002–03, when Parndorf won the Burgenlandliga by a record margin of 31 points, with a goal difference of 78–20, and went up to the third tier.

=== Regionalliga East and the play-offs ===
Parndorf won the Regionalliga East at the first attempt in 2003–04, finishing seven points clear, but lost the promotion play-off on the away goals rule. It was runner-up the following season behind Austria Wien II, then won the title again in 2005–06 ahead of St. Pölten and First Vienna. This time promotion was automatic, the second tier having been expanded to twelve clubs and the play-offs abolished.

The club survived its first season in the second division and regards 2006–07 as the most successful in its history, but was relegated in 2007–08 after losing a decisive home match against DSV Leoben.

Two further near-misses followed. In 2009–10 Parndorf finished third but was given a play-off place after the champion, Waidhofen an der Ybbs, did not apply for a licence and the runner-up, Admira Wacker Mödling II, was ineligible for promotion; it won the first leg 1–0 against a Wolfsberger AC and St. Andrä combination but lost the return 4–1. As champion in 2010–11 it lost the play-off to First Vienna.

=== Promotion and decline ===
The 2012–13 title finally produced promotion. Parndorf beat Blau-Weiß Linz, ninth in the second division, 2–1 at home and 1–0 away, the only one of its six promotion play-offs it has won. Under Paul Hafner the club did not win until the fourth match of 2013–14, went nine games without a victory and finished ninth. In the relegation play-off it lost 1–0 at home to LASK and drew 1–1 away in front of 10,000 spectators, returning to the third tier after a single season.

Parndorf was relegated from the Regionalliga East in 2018–19, finishing fourth from bottom, and spent six seasons in the Burgenlandliga. It finished second three years running, behind Siegendorf in 2022, Oberwart in 2023 and Siegendorf again in 2024.

=== Return ===
Parndorf won the Burgenlandliga in 2024–25, securing the title with five rounds to spare and eleven points in hand over Mattersburg, and closed the season with a 6–0 home win over Kohfidisch. Ten players were signed for the return to the third tier, among them forward Stephan Schimandl and midfielder Daniel Luxbacher.

In 2025–26 Parndorf finished second, level on 62 points with the champion Gloggnitz and with a better goal difference, but placed behind them.

== Other teams ==
The club runs a second team in the Burgenlandliga and a third in a playing partnership with ASV Neudorf, along with seven youth sides from under-6 to under-16 in the competitions of the Burgenland Football Association.

From 2009 it also ran a women's team, taken over from FC Winden, which played in the second division until 2013. That team and others from the surrounding area were then folded into a new club, ASK Women Soccer Bruck, which withdrew from competition in 2015.

== Honours ==
- Regionalliga East
  - Winners (4): 2003–04, 2005–06, 2010–11, 2012–13
  - Runners-up (2): 2004–05, 2025–26
- Burgenlandliga
  - Winners (2): 2002–03, 2024–25
