= Landesliga Burgenland =

- Country: Austria
- Confederation: Austrian Football Association
- Number of clubs: 16
- Level on pyramid: 4
- Promotion to: Austrian Regional League East
- Relegation to: 2. Liga Nord, 2. Liga Mitte and 2. Liga Süd
- Current champions: ASV Siegendorf (2023/24)
- Most championships: SV Oberwart
- Current: 2024–25 Landesliga Burgenland

The Landesliga Burgenland is the football division of the Austrian state of Burgenland. It is in the fourth highest division in Austrian football for clubs of the Burgenland Football Association (German: Burgenländischer Fussballverband).

== Mode ==
The league is made up of sixteen teams playing one home and one away match against each other. A season therefore comprises 30 match days.

The end of the season the champion is entitled to promotion into the third-class Austrian Regional League East. The number of teams that descend into the fifth-class divisions 2. Liga Nord, 2. Liga Mitte and 2. Liga Süd varies depending on the number of relegated Burgenland teams in the Regional League East. From 2. Liga Nord, 2. Liga Mitte and 2. Liga Süd respectively, one club advances into the Burgenland Landesliga.

== 2024–25 member clubs ==
- SC Bad Sauerbrunn
- FC Deutschkreutz
- ASV Draßburg
- SpG Edelserpentin (Stuben)
- USV Halbturn
- ASK Horitschon Unterpetersdorf
- UFC Jennersdorf
- ASKÖ Klingenbach
- ASK Kohfidisch
- SV Leithaprodersdorf
- Mattersburger SV
- SK Pama
- SC/ESV Parndorf 1919
- SC Pinkafeld
- SV Sankt Margarethen
- SV Schattendorf
Location of teams in 2024–25 Landesliga Burgenland
