= Austrian Regionalliga East =

- Founded: 1959, re-established 1985
- Country: Austria
- Confederation: UEFA
- Number of clubs: 16
- Level on pyramid: Level 2 (1959–1974); Level 3 (1974–present)
- Promotion to: Staatsliga (1959–1965); Nationalliga (1965–1974); 2. Liga (1974–present)
- Relegation to: Wiener Stadtliga; 1. Niederösterreichische Landesliga; Landesliga Burgenland
- Domestic cup: Austrian Cup
- Current champions: SV Gloggnitz (2025–26)
- Most championships: Parndorf, First Vienna and Wacker Wien (4 titles)
- Current: 2026–27

The Austrian Regionalliga East (German: Regionalliga Ost), is a men's football league in Austria. It covers Vienna, Lower Austria and Burgenland, and its clubs are registered with the football associations of those three states. The league is the oldest of the four Regionalligen, having been founded in 1959 alongside the Regionalliga Central.

From 1959 to 1974 the league formed part of the second tier of the Austrian football league system. A reorganisation in 1974 created a national second division and abolished the Central and West divisions, but the Regionalliga East survived and became a third tier competition. It was not contested between 1980 and 1985. Since its return it has run continuously apart from two seasons lost to the COVID-19 pandemic.

The Regionalliga East was the only division left untouched by the reform that took the third tier from three groups to four in 2026. Parndorf, First Vienna and Wacker Wien share the record with four titles each.

== History ==
=== Second tier (1959–1974) ===
The Regionalliga East was introduced for the 1959–60 season together with the Regionalliga Central. The two replaced the Staatsliga B as the second level of Austrian football, and a third division, the Regionalliga West, followed a year later. The champions of each division were promoted directly to the top flight, which was called the Staatsliga until 1965 and the Nationalliga thereafter. 1. Schwechater SC won the first title.

=== Survival and interruption (1974–1985) ===
The reorganisation of 1974–75 created a ten-club Bundesliga and a national second division. The Regionalliga West and the Regionalliga Central were both abolished. The Regionalliga East was not, and it continued as a third tier competition whose champion went up directly, while promotion from the west and centre of the country was decided by play-offs between state league champions.

That arrangement lasted six seasons. The Regionalliga East was then suspended in turn and was not contested from 1980–81 to 1984–85, a period in which promotion from the east was also settled by play-offs. The division returned for the 1985–86 season, won by VfB Mödling.

=== Since 1985 ===
Promotion arrangements have changed repeatedly. The East champion generally went up directly until 1995–96. Between 1996–97 and 2003–04 the three Regionalliga champions contested play-offs with the second-last club of the First League for two places. Direct promotion returned from 2005–06, play-offs came back in 2009–10, and from 2014–15 one division took a direct place on rotation while the other two met in a play-off.

Promotion has also depended on a club obtaining a licence for the second tier, and champions have repeatedly stayed put. Donaufeld won the title in 2024–25 but the promotion place went to the runners-up, Young Violets Austria Wien. Stripfing reached the 2. Liga after the 2022–23 title only following legal action.

No champions were declared in 2019–20 or 2020–21. Both seasons were abandoned because of the COVID-19 pandemic.

== Match-fixing case ==
The division was at the centre of what prosecutors described as the largest known organised match manipulation in Austrian football for a decade. The federal criminal police opened an investigation in November 2021, carrying out searches and arrests. The indictment covered nineteen matches played between March 2019 and November 2021, most of them in the Regionalliga East but also including fixtures in the Wiener Liga, the Burgenland Cup, two Austrian Cup ties and a friendly. Losses to bookmakers were put at just under 200,000 euros, of which about 88,000 euros was treated as attempted fraud.

The Austrian Football Association provisionally suspended nine players in March 2022 while the criminal inquiry continued. The trial opened at the regional criminal court in Graz in September 2022 with fifteen defendants, most of them former players at clubs in Vienna, Lower Austria and Burgenland. On 1 February 2023 nine of the ten remaining defendants were convicted and one was acquitted. Sentences ranged from a fine of 4,000 euros to twenty-four months partly suspended imprisonment.

== Format ==
Sixteen clubs play each other home and away over 30 matchdays. No champion is promoted automatically. The four Regionalliga winners contest two-legged ties for two places in the 2. Liga, and the pairings are drawn each year. The Regionalliga East champion was drawn against the Regionalliga South champion for 2026–27, with the first legs set for 1 and 2 June 2027 and the return matches for 4 and 5 June. A club must hold a 2. Liga licence before it can go up.

== 2025–26 season ==
Seventeen clubs contested the 2025–26 season over 34 matchdays. Gloggnitz took the title on 22 May 2026 after defeats for Kremser SC and Leobendorf, having survived relegation on the final day of the previous campaign. The club had come up through five divisions in six years. Gloggnitz did not take up the promotion place, which the club said was beyond it on financial and infrastructure grounds.

Pos	Club	Pld	W	D	L	GF	GA	GD	Pts
1	SV Gloggnitz	32	18	8	6	58	45	+13	62
2	SC/ESV Parndorf	32	18	8	6	58	34	+24	62
3	Kremser SC	32	17	7	8	61	33	+28	58
4	SV Leobendorf	32	18	3	11	48	34	+14	57
5	SV Oberwart	32	17	5	10	73	42	+31	56
6	SV Horn	32	14	9	9	57	35	+22	51
7	FCM Traiskirchen	32	14	8	10	70	52	+18	50
8	FC Marchfeld Donauauen	32	13	10	9	55	37	+18	49
9	SR Donaufeld	32	13	8	11	51	44	+7	47
10	Wiener Sport-Club	32	13	7	12	54	52	+2	46
11	SC Wiener Viktoria	32	13	6	13	50	51	−1	45
12	SV Donau Wien	32	12	8	12	50	57	−7	44
13	Favoritner AC	32	12	3	17	44	52	−8	39
14	Sportunion Mauer	32	10	7	15	32	47	−15	37
15	SC Neusiedl/See 1919	32	8	5	19	46	72	−26	29
16	SC Retz	32	4	8	20	25	64	−39	20
17	TWL Elektra	32	2	2	28	21	102	−81	8

== Champions ==
=== Second tier champions (1959–1974) ===
Regionalliga East champions 1959–60 to 1973–74
Club	Titles	Winning seasons
SC Wacker Wien	4	1961–62, 1963–64, 1965–66, 1967–68
1. Simmeringer SC	3	1964–65, 1969–70, 1972–73
SC Eisenstadt	2	1966–67, 1970–71
1. Schwechater SC	1	1959–60
SK Admira Wien	1	1960–61
1. Wiener Neustädter SC	1	1962–63
First Vienna FC	1	1968–69
SV Admira Wiener Neustadt	1	1971–72
SV Stockerau (Note: Competing as SV Heid Stockerau in 1973–74 and 1978–79.)	1	1973–74

=== Third tier champions (1974–present) ===
The league was not staged between 1980 and 1985.

Regionalliga Ost champions 1974–75 to 2025–26
Club	Titles	Winning seasons
SC/ESV Parndorf	4	2003–04, 2005–06, 2010–11, 2012–13
Favoritner AC	3	1977–78, 1990–91, 1994–95
First Vienna FC	3	2008–09, 2016–17, 2021–22
SV Horn	3	2011–12, 2015–16, 2017–18
SV Stockerau	2	1978–79, 1995–96
ASK Kottingbrunn	2	1996–97, 2000–01
SC Untersiebenbrunn	2	1997–98, 1998–99
SR Donaufeld	2	1989–90, 2024–25
SC Tulln	1	1974–75
Kremser SC	1	1975–76
ASV Kittsee	1	1976–77
SC Neusiedl am See	1	1979–80
VfB Mödling	1	1985–86
VSE St. Pölten	1	1986–87
SK Slovan Wien	1	1987–88
ASV Austria Vösendorf	1	1988–89
SV Oberwart	1	1991–92
1. Wiener Neustädter SC	1	1992–93
ASKÖ Klingenbach	1	1993–94
SV Mattersburg	1	1999–2000
Wiener Sportklub	1	2001–02
SV Schwechat	1	2002–03
Austria Wien II	1	2004–05
ASK Schwadorf	1	2006–07
SKN St. Pölten	1	2007–08
FC Waidhofen an der Ybbs	1	2009–10
FAC Team für Wien	1	2013–14
SC Ritzing	1	2014–15
ASK Ebreichsdorf	1	2018–19
SV Stripfing	1	2022–23
Rapid Wien II	1	2023–24
SV Gloggnitz	1	2025–26

== See also ==
- Austrian Regionalliga
- Austrian football league system
