= OÖ Liga =

Radio Oberösterreich Liga
- Founded: 1920
- Country: Austria
- Confederation: Austrian Football Association
- Number of clubs: 16
- Level on pyramid: 4
- Promotion to: Austrian Regional League Central
- Relegation to: Landesliga Ost and Landesliga West
- Current champions: ASKÖ Oedt (2022-23)
- Most championships: LASK Linz
- Sponsor(s): Radio Oberösterreich
- Website: http://www.ooeliga.at/

The OÖ Liga (whose official sponsor name is Radio OÖ Liga, and still colloquially known as the Oberösterreich-Liga) is the football division of the state of Upper Austria. It's Austrian footballs fourth highest league for clubs of the Upper Austrian Football Association (German: Oberösterreichischer Fußballverband, OFV). With the football associations of Carinthia and Styria, the OFV forms the Regional League Central, a portion of the three-pronged Austrian Regional League. Below the OO Liga there are Landesliga Ost and Landesliga West.

== Mode ==
The OÖ Liga is a league competition, in which 16 football clubs from Upper Austria participate. The championship title is played between these clubs in 30 rounds, each team plays against all other teams in one home and one away match. The matches are drawn before each season. The best-placed team at the end of the season is made Upper Austrian Champion and advances to the Regional League Central. The number of relegated team from the OÖ Liga is variable and depends on the number of teams that descend from the Regional League Central. This depends on which association the relegated team from the first divisionbelongs, too. Together with the two champions of the Landesliga Ost and Landesliga West as well as the relegated teams from the Regional League Central, making up a league with 16 teams. Therefore, the number of relegated teams varies from 2 to 4 teams, spread out on a regional basis in the Landesliga Ost and Landesliga West.

== 2023–24 member clubs ==
- SV Bad Ischl
- SU Bad Leonfelden
- SV Bad Schallerbach
- Union Dietach
- Union Edelweiss Linz
- SPG SV Friedburg/Pöndorf
- SV Grün-Weiß Micheldorf
- Union Mondsee
- ASKÖ Oedt
- UFC Ostermiething
- DSG Union Perg
- SPG Pregarten
- Union St. Martin im Mühlkreis
- ASK St. Valentin
- Union Weißkirchen/Allhaming
- FC Wels
Location of teams in 2020–21 OÖ Liga
