= Dornbirner SV =

- Full name: Hella Dornbirner Sport Verein
- Founded: 30 July 1954
- Ground: Sportplatz Haselstauden
- Capacity: 1,000
- Chairman: Herbert Lenz
- Manager: Roman Ellensohn
- League: Eliteliga Vorarlberg
Home colours

Dornbirner Sport Verein is an Austrian association football club from Vorarlberg, based in the town of Dornbirn, which was founded in 1954. They play their home games at the Sportplatz Haselstauden. They currently participate in the Eliteliga Vorarlberg.

== History ==
In 2002, the club was renamed Hella Dornbirner SV after their new sponsor. The club was promoted to the Vorarlbergliga in 2009 and again in 2015. They joined the newly-formed Eliteliga Vorarlberg in 2019.

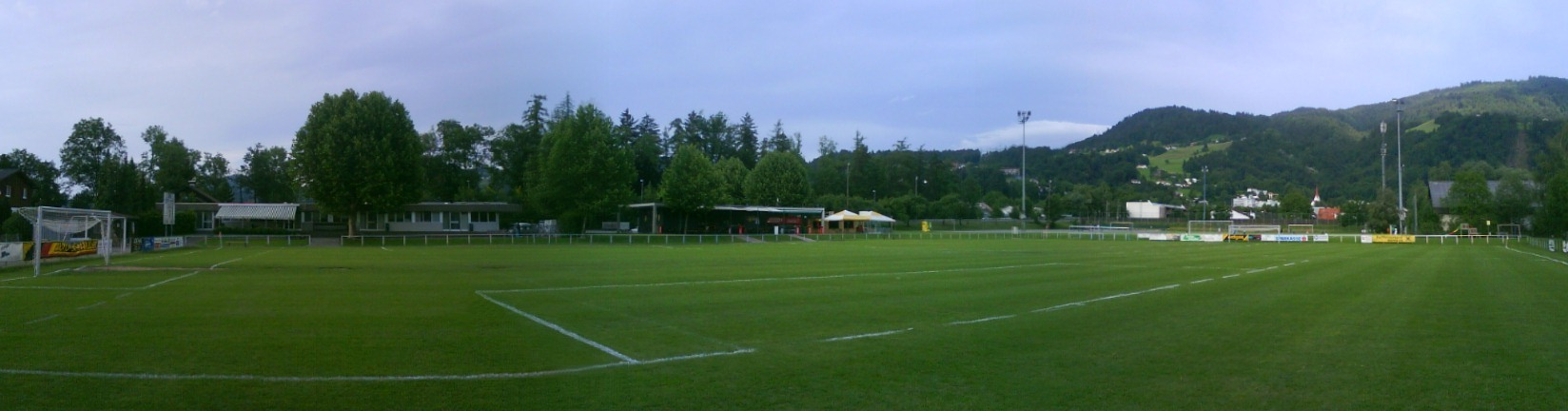
Sportplatz Haselstauden

== Players ==
=== Current squad ===
As of 1 December 2019

Note: Flags indicate national team as defined under FIFA eligibility rules; some limited exceptions apply. Players may hold more than one non-FIFA nationality.

| No. | Pos. | Nation | Player |
|---|---|---|---|
| — | DF | GER | André Bauer |
| — | MF | AUT | Julian Birgfellner |
| — | DF | AUT | Simon Bodemann |
| — | FW | BRA | Cordeiro Soares Junior Delcio |
| — | MF | AUT | Julian Erhart |
| — | GK | AUT | Kevin Fend |
| — | DF | AUT | Andreas Filler |
| — | MF | AUT | Jonas Gamper |
| — | | AUT | Michael Gehrer |
| — | DF | AUT | Haris Handanagic |
| — | FW | AUT | Paul Hartmann |
| — | MF | AUT | Mathias Hänsler |

| No. | Pos. | Nation | Player |
|---|---|---|---|
| — | FW | AUT | Harald Höfle |
| — | MF | AUT | Fethullah Kalkan |
| — | | AUT | Ethem Karaca |
| — | DF | AUT | Benjamin Kaufmann |
| — | DF | AUT | David Kovacec |
| — | DF | AUT | Dominik Kutzer |
| — | GK | AUT | Paul Rhomberg |
| — | MF | AUT | Andreas Röser |
| — | FW | AUT | Julian Schelling |
| — | | AUT | Marco Trost |
| — | DF | AUT | Leandros Tsohataridis |
