= Vorarlbergliga =

- Organising body: Vorarlberg Football Association; (part of Austrian Football Association)
- Country: Austria
- Confederation: UEFA
- Number of clubs: 16
- Level on pyramid: 4
- Promotion to: Eliteliga Vorarlberg
- Relegation to: Landesliga (Vorarlberg)
- Current champions: FC Alberschwende (2022–23)

The Vorarlbergliga is the highest football league of the Austrian state of Vorarlberg. It's the fourth highest football league in Austria. Exclusively limited to teams of the Vorarlberg Football Association (German: Vorarlberger Fussballverband, VFV).

Vorarlbergliga was part of the 4th highest level which called Austrian Landesliga. However, inside Vorarlberg state, Landesliga was the name of the fifth-tier which teams of Vorarlbergliga relegated to.

== Mode ==
The league consists of 16 teams. In each season, each club plays against each other club in one home and one away match. A season is therefore made up of 30 games.

The champion of the Vorarlbergliga is entitled to move up to the third-tier, the Regionalliga West. If the champion refuses the promotion, this can lead to a relegation from the league, which has been implicated since the 2011–12 season. The number of teams that descend directly into the fifth class the Landesliga, depends on the number of teams from Vorarlberg which descend from the Regionalliga West. Every season, at least one club moves up. On the other hand, every year two teams move down directly to the Vorarlbergliga. In addition, since the 2014–15 season, at the end of the championship a relegation between the third placed team of the Landesliga and the lowest ranked non relegated team from the Vorarlbergliga is held. Relegation consists of a home and away game.

== 2023–24 member clubs ==
- VfB Bezau
- FC Bizau
- FC Blau-Weiss Feldkirch
- Dornbirn Juniors
- SV Frastanz
- SC Fussach
- SPG Großwalsertal
- FC Hittisau
- FC Koblach
- SV Ludesch
- SK Meiningen
- FC Riefensberg
- FC Schwarzenberg
- FC Sulzberg
Location of teams in 2023–24 Vorarlbergliga
