= FC Hard =

- Full name: Fußballclub Hard
- Founded: 1922; 103 years ago
- Ground: Waldstadion Hard
- Capacity: 2,550 (750 seated)
- Chairman: Markus Mistura
- Manager: Christian Tschofen
- Coach: Herbert Sutter
- League: Vorarlbergliga
Home colours	Away colours

FC Hard is an Austrian football club located in Hard, a town in the country's westernmost state of Vorarlberg. They currently play in the Vorarlbergliga, the 4th tier of Austrian football.

== History ==
The club was formed in 1922 as SpVgg Hard. The name was changed to FC Hard in 1947. The club played in the fourth tier Vorarlbergliga for most of its history. Since winning that league in 1989, the team has competed in the Austrian Regional League West.

== Stadium ==
FC Hard play their home matches in Waldstadion Hard, which is located in the north of the town near Lake Constance. The current capacity is 2550, of which 750 is covered seating. The average attendance for the 2010–11 season was 407.

== Achievements ==
- Austrian Regional League (West) (III):
  - Winners (1): 2002
  - Runners Up (4): 1992, 1994, 1995, 2007
- Vorarlbergliga State League (IV):
  - Winners (2): 1978, 1989
  - Runners Up (4): 1985, 1986, 1987, 1988

== See also ==
- Football in Austria
- Austrian Regional League West
