= 2018–19 Austrian Regionalliga =

Austrian Regionalliga
- Season: 2018–19
- Champions: Grazer AK (Mitte); FC Dornbirn 1913 (West); ASK Ebreichsdorf (Ost)
- Promoted: Grazer AK; FC Dornbirn 1913
- Relegated: SC-ESV Parndorf 1919; SKN St. Pölten Juniors; FC Stadlau; SV Schwechat; VST Völkermarkt; FC Lendorf

The 2018–19 Austrian Regionalliga was the 60th season of the Austrian third-tier football league.

The Regionalliga is split into East, West and Middle (German: Ost, West & Mitte) divisions. The Regionalliga Ost is formed by clubs from the Vienna, Lower Austria and Burgenland Football Associations. The Regionalliga Mitte is made up of clubs from the Upper Austria, Carinthia and Styria Football Associations. The Regionalliga West is made up of clubs from the Salzburg, Tirol and Vorarlberg Football Associations.

== Regionalliga Ost ==
Location of teams in the 2018–19 Austrian Regionalliga Ost (Vienna)
SV Schwechat is considered a Viennese club
Location of teams in the 2018–19 Austrian Regionalliga Ost (Lower Austria)
ASK-BSC Bruck/Leitha is a Lower Austrian club but plays its games in Burgenland
Location of teams in the 2017–18 Austrian Regionalliga Ost (Burgenland)

Pos	Team	Pld	W	D	L	GF	GA	GD	Pts	Promotion or relegation
1	ASK Ebreichsdorf (C)	30	23	3	4	90	20	+70	72	
2	FC Mauerwerk	30	20	5	5	64	29	+35	65	
3	FC Mannsdorf/Großenzersdorf	30	17	6	7	61	36	+25	57	
4	Wiener Sport-Club	30	15	7	8	55	49	+6	52	
5	SV Leobendorf	30	13	12	5	43	27	+16	51	
6	SK Rapid Wien II	30	15	5	10	55	36	+19	50	
7	SC Neusiedl am See	30	13	5	12	54	54	0	44	
8	FCM Traiskirchen	30	12	4	14	52	56	−4	40	
9	ASK-BSC Bruck/Leitha	30	12	4	14	45	57	−12	40	
10	SV Mattersburg II	30	10	6	14	45	57	−12	36	
11	SC Team Wiener Linien	30	9	8	13	46	52	−6	35	
12	FC Admira Wacker Mödling II	30	10	5	15	44	61	−17	35	
13	SC-ESV Parndorf 1919 (R)	30	7	11	12	43	52	−9	32	Relegation to 2019–20 Austrian Landesliga
14	SKN St. Pölten II (R)	30	6	9	15	37	59	−22	27	Relegation to 2019–20 Austrian Landesliga
15	FC Stadlau (R)	30	5	8	17	37	68	−31	23	Relegation to 2019–20 Austrian Landesliga
16	SV Schwechat (R)	30	2	4	24	22	80	−58	10	Relegation to 2019–20 Austrian Landesliga

Source: Regionalliga Ost
Rules for classification: 1) Points; 2) Less matches awarded against; 3) Goal difference; 4) Goals scored; 5) Matches won; 6) Away matches won; 7) Head-to-head points; 8) Head-to-head goal difference; 9) Head-to-head goals scored.
(C) Champions; (R) Relegated

== Regionalliga Mitte ==
Location of teams in the 2018–19 Austrian Regionalliga Mitte (Upper Austria)
Location of teams in the 2018–19 Austrian Regionalliga Mitte (Styria)
Location of teams in the 2018–19 Austrian Regionalliga Mitte (Carinthia)

Pos	Team	Pld	W	D	L	GF	GA	GD	Pts	Promotion or relegation
1	Grazer AK (C, P)	30	21	5	4	70	28	+42	68	Promotion to 2019–20 Austrian Second League
2	FC Gleisdorf 09	30	16	6	8	62	37	+25	54	
3	TuS Bad Gleichenberg	30	15	6	9	70	51	+19	51	
4	Union Vöcklamarkt	30	15	6	9	61	48	+13	51	
5	ATSV Stadl-Paura	30	15	6	9	56	51	+5	51	
6	USV Allerheiligen	30	14	6	10	53	37	+16	48	
7	SK Sturm Graz II	30	13	8	9	60	46	+14	47	
8	Wolfsberger AC II	30	14	4	12	61	48	+13	46	
9	SC Weiz	30	13	6	11	65	54	+11	45	
10	Deutschlandsberger SC	30	12	8	10	57	52	+5	44	
11	Union Gurten	30	10	9	11	41	41	0	39	
12	WSC Hertha Wels	30	11	5	14	56	64	−8	38	
13	SC Kalsdorf	30	10	5	15	43	56	−13	35	
14	VST Völkermarkt (R)	30	6	2	22	31	73	−42	20	Relegation to 2019–20 Austrian Landesliga
15	FC Lendorf (R)	30	5	5	20	32	77	−45	20	Relegation to 2019–20 Austrian Landesliga
16	FC Wels	30	3	7	20	30	85	−55	16	

Source: Regionalliga Mitte
Rules for classification: 1) Points; 2) Less matches awarded against; 3) Goal difference; 4) Goals scored; 5) Matches won; 6) Away matches won; 7) Head-to-head points; 8) Head-to-head goal difference; 9) Head-to-head goals scored.
(C) Champions; (P) Promoted; (R) Relegated

== Regionalliga West ==
Location of teams in the 2017–18 Austrian Regionalliga West (Salzburg)
Location of teams in the 2017–18 Austrian Regionalliga West (Tyrol)
Location of teams in the 2017–18 Austrian Regionalliga West (Vorarlberg)

Pos	Team	Pld	W	D	L	GF	GA	GD	Pts	Promotion or relegation
1	FC Dornbirn 1913 (C, P)	30	22	6	2	70	23	+47	72	Promotion to 2019–20 Austrian Second League
2	FC Kitzbühel	30	19	8	3	59	28	+31	65	
3	USK Anif	30	19	4	7	98	37	+61	61	
4	FC Kufstein	30	16	7	7	55	31	+24	55	
5	SV Seekirchen 1945	30	15	6	9	57	42	+15	51	
6	TSV St. Johann	30	14	8	8	66	43	+23	50	
7	SC Schwaz	30	14	5	11	44	42	+2	47	
8	SV Wörgl	30	13	4	13	60	59	+1	43	
9	SVG Reichenau	30	12	6	12	50	45	+5	42	
10	SV Grödig	30	11	5	14	38	46	−8	38	
11	VfB Hohenems	30	9	3	18	52	70	−18	30	
12	SV Wals-Grünau	30	8	6	16	34	55	−21	30	
13	SCR Altach II	30	8	4	18	31	49	−18	28	
14	FC Pinzgau Saalfelden	30	6	7	17	38	73	−35	25	
15	FC Langenegg	30	7	1	22	35	89	−54	22	
16	SK Bischofshofen	30	5	4	21	31	86	−55	19	

Source: Regionalliga West
Rules for classification: 1) Points; 2) Less matches awarded against; 3) Goal difference; 4) Goals scored; 5) Matches won; 6) Away matches won; 7) Head-to-head points; 8) Head-to-head goal difference; 9) Head-to-head goals scored.
(C) Champions; (P) Promoted

== See also ==
- 2018–19 Austrian Football Bundesliga
- 2018–19 Austrian Football Second League
- 2018–19 Austrian Cup
