= 2024–25 Austrian Regionalliga =

Austrian Regionalliga
- Season: 2024–25
- Champions: Ost: Donaufeld; Mitte: Hertha Wels; West: Austria Salzburg
- Promoted: Ost: Young Violets Austria Wien; Mitte: Hertha Wels; West: Austria Salzburg
- Relegated: Ost: Favoritner AC, Mauerwerk, Siegendorf; Mitte: Leoben, Union Vöcklamarkt, Vortwärts Steyr, Wildon; West: Dornbirn 1913, Röthis
- Matches: 720

The 2024–25 Austrian Regionalliga is the 66th season of the Austrian third-tier football league.

The Regionalliga is split into East, West and Middle (German: Ost, West & Mitte) divisions. The Regionalliga Ost is formed by clubs from the Vienna, Lower Austria and Burgenland Football Associations. The Regionalliga Mitte is made up of clubs from the Upper Austria, Carinthia and Styria Football Associations. The Regionalliga West is made up of clubs from the Salzburg, Tirol and Vorarlberg Football Associations.

== Regionalliga Ost ==
Pos	Team	Pld	W	D	L	GF	GA	GD	Pts	Promotion or relegation
1	Donaufeld (C)	30	19	6	5	60	33	+27	63	
2	Young Violets Austria Wien (P)	30	17	7	6	61	31	+30	58	Promotion to 2025–26 Austrian Second League
3	Marchfeld Donauauen	30	16	8	6	52	21	+31	56	
4	Neusiedl am See	30	16	7	7	59	40	+19	55	
5	Wiener Sport-Club	30	12	12	6	54	43	+11	48	
6	Kremser SC	30	12	11	7	55	40	+15	47	
7	Oberwart	30	11	11	8	40	34	+6	44	
8	Traiskirchen	30	11	9	10	56	56	0	42	
9	TWL Elektra	30	10	11	9	51	45	+6	41	
10	Union Mauer	30	12	5	13	42	46	−4	41	
11	Leobendorf	30	8	9	13	48	47	+1	33	
12	Wiener Viktoria	30	8	9	13	35	56	−21	33	
13	Gloggnitz	30	6	9	15	42	64	−22	27	
14	Favoritner AC (R)	30	6	8	16	34	58	−24	26	Relegation to 2025–26 Austrian Landesliga
15	Mauerwerk (R)	30	4	7	19	30	70	−40	19	Relegation to 2025–26 Austrian Landesliga
16	Siegendorf (R)	30	4	7	19	34	68	−34	19	Relegation to 2025–26 Austrian Landesliga

Source: Flashscore
Rules for classification: 1) Points; 2) Less matches awarded against; 3) Goal difference; 4) Goals scored; 5) Matches won; 6) Away matches won; 7) Head-to-head points; 8) Head-to-head goal difference; 9) Head-to-head goals scored.
(C) Champions; (P) Promoted; (R) Relegated

== Regionalliga Mitte ==
Pos	Team	Pld	W	D	L	GF	GA	GD	Pts	Promotion or relegation
1	Hertha Wels (C, P)	30	20	5	5	67	34	+33	65	Promotion to 2025–26 Austrian Second League
2	Union Gurten	30	17	7	6	42	25	+17	58	
3	Wolfsberger AC II	30	16	7	7	51	28	+23	55	
4	Oedt	30	16	6	8	67	40	+27	54	
5	Wallern/St. Marienkirchen	30	14	8	8	63	41	+22	50	
6	Weiz	30	14	4	12	72	52	+20	46	
7	Leoben (R)	30	13	3	14	53	61	−8	42	Relegation to 2025–26 Austrian Landesliga
8	St. Anna Am Aigen	30	12	5	13	45	59	−14	41	
9	Junge Wikinger Ried	30	13	2	15	56	58	−2	41	
10	Deutschlandsberger SC	30	10	9	11	54	58	−4	39	
11	LASK Amateur OÖ	30	10	7	13	51	44	+7	37	
12	Treibach	30	10	6	14	35	59	−24	36	
13	Gleisdorf 09	30	10	4	16	40	55	−15	34	
14	Union Vöcklamarkt (R)	30	7	7	16	44	63	−19	28	Relegation to 2025–26 Austrian Landesliga
15	Vorwärts Steyr (R)	30	6	6	18	29	54	−25	24	Relegation to 2025–26 Austrian Landesliga
16	Wildon (R)	30	5	8	17	32	70	−38	23	Relegation to 2025–26 Austrian Landesliga

Source: Flashscore
Rules for classification: 1) Points; 2) Less matches awarded against; 3) Goal difference; 4) Goals scored; 5) Matches won; 6) Away matches won; 7) Head-to-head points; 8) Head-to-head goal difference; 9) Head-to-head goals scored.
(C) Champions; (P) Promoted; (R) Relegated

== Regionalliga West ==
Pos	Team	Pld	W	D	L	GF	GA	GD	Pts	Promotion or relegation
1	Austria Salzburg (C, P)	30	23	3	4	71	24	+47	72	Promotion to 2025–26 Austrian Second League
2	Imst	30	21	6	3	64	20	+44	69	
3	Reichenau	30	18	4	8	54	31	+23	58	
4	Hohenems	30	15	8	7	55	38	+17	53	
5	Wals-Grünau	30	15	5	10	46	31	+15	50	
6	Dornbirn 1913	30	13	8	9	55	40	+15	47	
7	SCR Altach Juniors	30	14	4	12	51	52	−1	46	
8	Kuchl	30	12	9	9	58	46	+12	45	
9	Bischofshofen	30	11	9	10	50	41	+9	42	
10	Pinzgau Saalfelden	30	8	10	12	37	49	−12	34	
11	St. Johann	30	9	6	15	35	47	−12	33	
12	Schwaz	30	9	3	18	30	44	−14	30	
13	Lauterach	30	7	5	18	30	72	−42	26	
14	Kitzbühel	30	6	6	18	30	54	−24	24	
15	Kufstein	30	4	10	16	34	60	−26	22	
16	Röthis (R)	30	5	4	21	32	83	−51	19	Relegation to 2025–26 Austrian Landesliga

Source: Flashscore
Rules for classification: 1) Points; 2) Less matches awarded against; 3) Goal difference; 4) Goals scored; 5) Matches won; 6) Away matches won; 7) Head-to-head points; 8) Head-to-head goal difference; 9) Head-to-head goals scored.
(C) Champions; (P) Promoted; (R) Relegated

== See also ==
- 2024–25 Austrian Football Bundesliga
- 2024–25 Austrian Football Second League
- 2024–25 Austrian Cup
