= 2017–18 Austrian Regionalliga =

Austrian Regionalliga
- Season: 2017–18
- Champions: SV Lafnitz (Mitte); USK Anif (West); SV Horn (Ost)
- Promoted: SV Horn; SKU Amstetten; Austria Wien II; SV Lafnitz; Vorwärts Steyr; LASK Juniors OÖ; Austria Klagenfurt; Wacker Innsbruck II
- Relegated: Union St. Florian; FC Hard; FC Alberschwende
- Demoted: First Vienna FC
- Matches: 720
- Goals: 2,342 (3.25 per match)

The 2017–18 Austrian Regionalliga was the 59th season of the Austrian third-tier football league.

The Regionalliga is split into East, West and Middle (German: Ost, West & Mitte) divisions. The Regionalliga Ost is formed by clubs from the Vienna, Lower Austria and Burgenland Football Associations. The Regionalliga Mitte is made up of clubs from the Upper Austria, Carinthia and Styria Football Associations. The Regionalliga West is made up of clubs from the Salzburg, Tirol and Vorarlberg Football Associations.

Due to the expansion of the Austrian leagues, this season eight clubs were promoted to the 2018–19 Second League, i.e. the successful promotion applicants from each division. A ninth team would have played in a promotion/relegation play-off against the bottom placed team in the First League, but the Austrian FA decided against relegation to the Regionalliga, so there was no play-off.

== Regionalliga Ost ==
Location of teams in the 2017–18 Austrian Regionalliga Ost (Vienna)
SV Schwechat is considered a Viennese club
Location of teams in the 2017–18 Austrian Regionalliga Ost (Lower Austria)
ASK-BSC Bruck/Leitha is a Lower Austrian club but plays its games in Burgenland
Location of teams in the 2017–18 Austrian Regionalliga Ost (Burgenland)

Pos	Team	Pld	W	D	L	GF	GA	GD	Pts	Promotion or relegation
1	SV Horn (Note: Submitted promotion applications.) (C, P)	30	20	5	5	61	25	+36	65	Promotion to 2018–19 Austrian Second League
2	ASK Ebreichsdorf	30	19	5	6	57	26	+31	62	
3	SKU Amstetten (P)	30	19	4	7	69	30	+39	61	Promotion to 2018–19 Austrian Second League
4	FK Austria Wien II (P)	30	17	6	7	59	36	+23	57	Promotion to 2018–19 Austrian Second League
5	FC Karabakh Wien	30	17	5	8	61	44	+17	56	
6	SK Rapid Wien II	30	13	7	10	56	48	+8	46	
7	FC Marchfeld Mannsdorf	30	12	10	8	46	44	+2	46	
8	FCM Traiskirchen	30	12	5	13	36	46	−10	41	
9	ASK-BSC Bruck/Leitha	30	11	6	13	47	55	−8	39	
10	FC Stadlau	30	10	5	15	34	40	−6	35	
11	SC Neusiedl am See	30	9	5	16	38	58	−20	32	
12	FC Admira Wacker Mödling II	30	8	7	15	42	51	−9	31	
13	SC-ESV Parndorf 1919	30	8	5	17	37	61	−24	29	
14	SKN St. Pölten II	30	7	7	16	36	51	−15	28	
15	Wiener Sport-Club	30	7	7	16	39	62	−23	28	
16	SV Schwechat	30	5	3	22	25	66	−41	18	
17	First Vienna FC (D)	0	0	0	0	0	0	0	0	Excluded (Note: First Vienna FC was excluded after the 18th matchday after the Supreme Court confirmed the verdict that the club must descend to the 2nd Landesliga after a petition for bankruptcy. All games have been canceled.)

Source: Regionalliga Ost
Rules for classification: 1) Points; 2) Less matches awarded against; 3) Goal difference; 4) Goals scored; 5) Matches won; 6) Away matches won; 7) Head-to-head points; 8) Head-to-head goal difference; 9) Head-to-head goals scored.
(C) Champions; (D) Disqualified; (P) Promoted

== Regionalliga Mitte ==
Location of teams in the 2017–18 Austrian Regionalliga Mitte (Upper Austria)
Location of teams in the 2017–18 Austrian Regionalliga Mitte (Styria)
Location of teams in the 2017–18 Austrian Regionalliga Mitte (Carinthia)

Pos	Team	Pld	W	D	L	GF	GA	GD	Pts	Promotion or relegation
1	SV Lafnitz (Note: Submitted promotion applications; USV Allerheigen's application was declined at the first attempt.) (C, P)	30	19	10	1	70	16	+54	67	Promotion to 2018–19 Austrian Second League
2	FC Gleisdorf 09	30	17	6	7	60	33	+27	57	
3	SK Vorwärts Steyr (P)	30	17	4	9	70	36	+34	55	Promotion to 2018–19 Austrian Second League
4	LASK Juniors OÖ (P)	30	16	4	10	54	46	+8	52	Promotion to 2018–19 Austrian Second League
5	SK Austria Klagenfurt (P)	30	14	6	10	57	48	+9	48	Promotion to 2018–19 Austrian Second League
6	USV Allerheiligen	30	13	8	9	59	41	+18	47	
7	Union Vöcklamarkt	30	14	5	11	52	43	+9	47	
8	Deutschlandsberger SC	30	14	5	11	50	43	+7	47	
9	SK Sturm Graz II	30	13	3	14	45	48	−3	42	
10	TuS Bad Gleichenberg	30	11	6	13	44	54	−10	39	
11	Union Gurten	30	9	10	11	45	46	−1	37	
12	Wolfsberger AC II	30	10	3	17	41	63	−22	33	
13	SC Weiz	30	8	8	14	43	58	−15	32	
14	SC Kalsdorf	30	8	5	17	36	52	−16	29	
15	ATSV Stadl-Paura	30	6	9	15	32	67	−35	27	
16	Union St. Florian (R)	30	3	4	23	14	76	−62	13	Relegation to 2018–19 Austrian Landesliga

Source: Regionalliga Mitte
Rules for classification: 1) Points; 2) Less matches awarded against; 3) Goal difference; 4) Goals scored; 5) Matches won; 6) Away matches won; 7) Head-to-head points; 8) Head-to-head goal difference; 9) Head-to-head goals scored.
(C) Champions; (P) Promoted; (R) Relegated

== Regionalliga West ==
Location of teams in the 2017–18 Austrian Regionalliga West (Salzburg)
Location of teams in the 2017–18 Austrian Regionalliga West (Tyrol)
Location of teams in the 2017–18 Austrian Regionalliga West (Vorarlberg)

Pos	Team	Pld	W	D	L	GF	GA	GD	Pts	Promotion or relegation
1	USK Anif	30	20	7	3	92	24	+68	67	
2	SV Grödig	30	17	10	3	73	27	+46	61	
3	SC Schwaz	30	14	11	5	49	33	+16	53	
4	SCR Altach II	30	14	7	9	63	45	+18	49	
5	FC Kitzbühel	30	12	11	7	58	39	+19	47	
6	FC Dornbirn 1913	30	10	13	7	40	42	−2	43	
7	SV Wals-Grünau	30	12	6	12	58	53	+5	42	
8	FC Wacker Innsbruck II (Note: Only club to apply for promotion.) (P)	30	11	8	11	48	50	−2	41	Promotion to 2018–19 Austrian Second League
9	VfB Hohenems	30	11	8	11	51	61	−10	41	
10	FC Kufstein	30	11	5	14	56	53	+3	38	
11	TSV St. Johann	30	9	9	12	48	55	−7	36	
12	SV Seekirchen 1945	30	10	6	14	46	54	−8	36	
13	SV Wörgl	30	9	7	14	45	59	−14	34	
14	FC Hard (Note: In November 2017, FC Hard announced their withdrawal from the Regionalliga at the end of the season.) (R)	30	5	14	11	37	62	−25	29	Relegation to 2018–19 Austrian Landesliga
15	FC Pinzgau Saalfelden	30	7	3	20	35	74	−39	24	
16	FC Alberschwende (R)	30	2	7	21	28	96	−68	13	Relegation to 2018–19 Austrian Landesliga

Source: Regionalliga West
Rules for classification: 1) Points; 2) Less matches awarded against; 3) Goal difference; 4) Goals scored; 5) Matches won; 6) Away matches won; 7) Head-to-head points; 8) Head-to-head goal difference; 9) Head-to-head goals scored.
(P) Promoted; (R) Relegated

== See also ==
- 2017–18 Austrian Football Bundesliga
- 2017–18 Austrian Football First League
- 2017–18 Austrian Cup
