= Silesia national football team =

Silesia
- Association: Silesian Football Association
- FIFA code: none
First colours	Second colours

First international
- Galicia 0–1 Moravia and Silesia (Kraków, Poland; 31 August 1913) as Silesia; Silesia 0–1 Poland (Katowice, Poland; 30 October 1932)

Biggest win
- Silesia 7–2 Tanzania (Chorzów, Poland; 22 July 1974)

Biggest defeat
- Silesia 3–4 Basque Country (Chorzów, Poland; 9 June 1937); Silesia 0–1 Poland (Katowice, Poland; 30 October 1932); Silesia 1–2 Poland (Katowice, Poland; 4 October 1933); Silesia 2–3 Poland (Chorzów, Poland; 26 April 1953)

Silesia national football team (Polish: Reprezentacja Śląska w piłce nożnej) is an informal regional football team made up of players from football clubs located in Silesia, under the auspices of the Silesian Football Association (Polish: Śląski Związek Piłki Nożnej). It is not affiliated to FIFA, and does not play in official international matches.

== Matches ==
=== Silesia vs Poland ===
No.	Date	Stadium	Match	Result	Turnout	Goalscorers
1	30 October 1932	Katowice	Silesia vs. Poland	0–1	5,000	Stefan Pytel
2	4 October 1933	KS Police Stadium, Katowice	Silesia vs. Poland	1–2	5,000	Hubert Gad, Ryszard Piec
3	26 April 1953	Ruch Stadium, Chorzów	Silesia vs. Poland	2–3	12,000	Miroslav Wiecek, Ewald Wiśniowski
4	13 September 1953	Polonia Stadium, Bytom	Silesia vs. Poland	3–3	3,000	Lucjan Brychczy (2), Tadeusz Stawowy
5	9 December 2006	Ruch Stadium, Chorzów	Silesia vs. Poland	1–1	5,000	Adam Kompała

=== Silesia vs other national football teams ===
Date	Stadium	Match	Result	Turnout	Goalscorers
9 June 1937	Ruch Stadium, Chorzów	Silesia vs. Basque Country (Basque Country (autonomous community))	3–4	?	Jerzy Wostal (2), Ernest Wilimowski
20 April 1948	AKS Stadium, Chorzów	Silesia vs. Czechoslovakia	2–1	?	Bąk, Gerard Cieślik, Stefan Pytel
24 August 1952	Ruch Stadium, Chorzów	Silesia vs. China	5–1	15,000	Kazimierz Trampisz (3), Gerard Cieślik (2)
13 September 1953	Stadion Polonii Bytom, Bytom	Silesia vs. Poland B	3–3	3,000	Lucjan Brychczy (2), Tadeusz Stawowy
22 July 1974	Stadion Śląski, Chorzów	Silesia vs. Tanzania	7–2	37,000	Joachim Marx (3), Henryk Zdebel (2), Ryszard Błachut, Jerzy Radecki

- Note: This is not a full list!

=== Other matches ===
31 August 1913	Galicia	1–2	Moravia and Silesia	Kraków
	Dąbrowski 7'	Historia Wisły	Kitler 35'; Strack 85'	Stadium: Park Gier Cracovii; Referee: Orest Dżułyński (Lviv)

== Players ==
=== Last call-up ===
The following players were called up for the friendly against Poland on 9 December 2006.

Head coach: Antoni Piechniczek

No.	Pos.	Player	Date of birth (age)	Caps	Club
1	GK	Sebastian Nowak	13 January 1982 (aged 24)		Ruch Chorzów
2	MF	Adam Kompała	16 August 1973 (aged 33)		Piast Gliwice
3	DF	Grzegorz Baran	23 December 1982 (aged 23)		Ruch Chorzów
4	DF	Błażej Radler	2 August 1982 (aged 24)		Górnik Zabrze
5	DF	Dariusz Dudek	8 April 1975 (aged 31)		Ruch Chorzów
6	DF	Wojciech Grzyb	21 December 1974 (aged 31)		Ruch Chorzów
7	MF	Jan Woś	17 February 1974 (aged 32)		Odra Wodzisław Śląski
8	MF	Marcin Malinowski	6 November 1975 (aged 31)		Odra Wodzisław Śląski
9	FW	Krzysztof Warzycha (c)	17 November 1964 (aged 42)		retired
10	MF	Tomasz Kasprzyk	28 July 1979 (aged 27)		Grunwald Ruda Slaska
11	FW	Tomasz Moskal	8 July 1975 (aged 31)		Górnik Zabrze
12	GK	Mateusz Sławik	3 November 1980 (aged 26)		Górnik Zabrze
13	FW	Rafał Jankowski	18 August 1985 (aged 21)		Kujawiak Kowal
14	MF	Mariusz Muszalik	23 September 1979 (aged 27)		Odra Wodzisław Śląski
15	MF	Marcin Lachowski	5 January 1981 (aged 25)		Zagłębie Sosnowiec
16	FW	Mariusz Mężyk	2 September 1983 (aged 23)		Polonia Bytom
17	MF	Bartłomiej Chwalibogowski	7 August 1982 (aged 24)		Zagłębie Sosnowiec
18	MF	Łukasz Wijas	20 March 1985 (aged 21)		GKS Katowice
19	DF	Jacek Broniewicz	17 September 1981 (aged 25)		Polonia Bytom
20	FW	Piotr Ćwielong	23 April 1986 (aged 20)		Ruch Chorzów
21	DF	Daniel Treściński	1 May 1978 (aged 28)		Zagłębie Sosnowiec
22	MF	Damian Seweryn	30 September 1979 (aged 27)		Górnik Zabrze
23	DF	Szymon Kapias	12 June 1984 (aged 22)		GKS Katowice
