= Thomas Löffler =

Austrian footballer

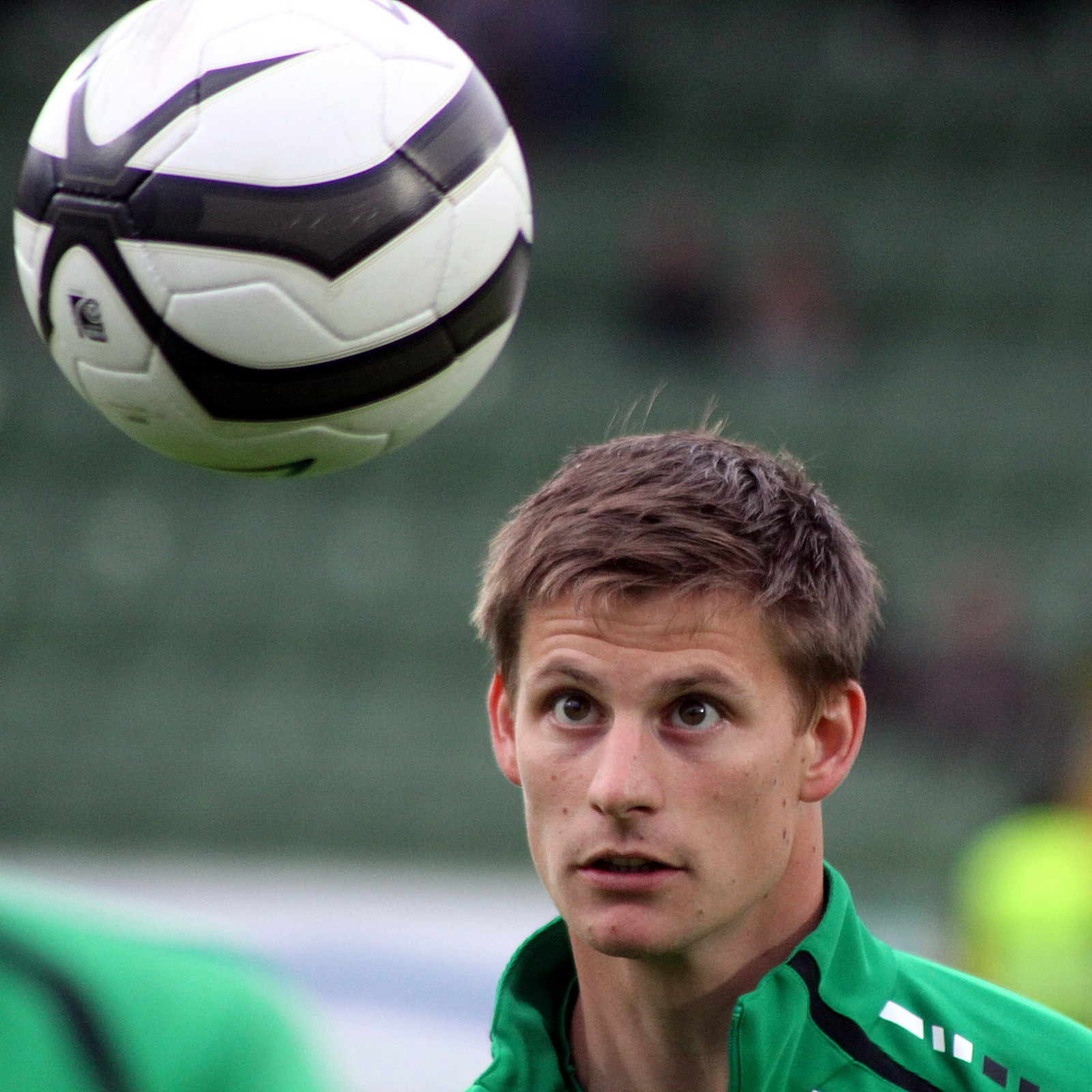
- Löffler in 2013

Personal information
- Date of birth: 1 May 1989 (age 37)
- Place of birth: Austria
- Position: Defender

Team information
- Current team: FC Natters (Manager)

Youth career
- 1995–2006: SV Fritzens

Senior career*
Years	Team	Apps	(Gls)
2006–2007	SV Fritzens	11	(2)
2007–2008	SV Hall	24	(2)
2008–2014	Wacker Innsbruck	75	(4)
2009–2014	Wacker Innsbruck II	16	(1)
2014	TSV Hartberg	14	(1)
2015–2020	UVB Vöcklamarkt	129	(7)
2020	SV Wörgl	0	(0)

Managerial career
- 2016–2018: UVB Vöcklamarkt (youth coach)
- 2018–2020: SFV (youth coach)
- 2020: SV Wörgl (player-assistant)
- 2021: Wacker Innsbruck (youth coach)
- 2021–2022: Wacker Innsbruck III
- 2022: Wacker Innsbruck II
- 2022–: FC Natters
- * Club domestic league appearances and goals

Thomas Löffler (born 1 May 1989) is a retired Austrian footballer and current manager of Austrian club FC Koch Türe Natters.

== Career ==
=== Coaching career ===
Löffler started his coaching career in 2016, when he was hired as a youth coach - while playing for the clubs first team - at UVB Vöcklamarkt. Subsequently, he spent a few years as a youth coach in the Salzburg Football Association.

In June 2020, Löfler moved to SV Wörgl, where he would function as a player-assistant and head of the clubs youth sector. In February 2021, Löffler returned to his former club, Wacker Innsbruck, as a youth coach. Ahead of the 2021-22 season, he took charge of the clubs 3rd senior team. On 3 June 2022, Wacker confirmed that Löffler, with Florian Anderle as his assistant coach, would take charge of the clubs reserve team until the end of the season.

In July 2022, he was appointed manager of Tiroler Liga side FC Koch Türe Natters.
