= Lower Austrian Football Cup =

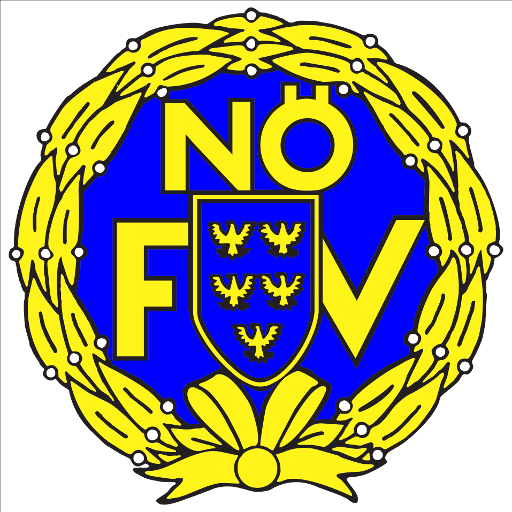
Cup logo

The Lower Austrian Football Cup (German: Niederösterreichische Fußballcup – official named the "Niederösterreichischer Landespokal" until 1975, and starting in 1983 called "NÖ-Meistercup") is one of nine Austrian football cup competitions for the level of the regional football associations and is organized by the Lower Austrian Football Association (German: Niederösterreichischer Fussballverband; NÖFV). Currently, it is also known as the "Admiral NÖ-Meistercup".

The football cup was one of the highlights, next to the championship, in the late 1920s to the 1950s in Lower Austria. After several interruptions, the competition has been held every year since 1984, under the official name of the NÖ-Meistercup. Eligible teams to participate in the competition are the champion clubs of each of the Lower Austrian leagues.

== Organization ==
The Lower Austrian Football Cup takes place after a qualifying round which is made up of five rounds, including the finals. The winner automatically qualifies for the 1st round of the next Austrian Cup.

Eligible clubs are the champions of all leagues up to the 2nd division. The draw for the first round takes place in geographical terms. Clubs from the 2nd and 3rd division have, until the 3rd round, the rights to home advantage if they have to play against champions from the 2nd national league and area leagues. The champions of the country leagues have to also play abroad in the 2nd round, when they play against teams from the area leagues. For the semi-finals, the first drawn club has the option of home or away.

== History ==
=== The Landescup 1927-1975 ===
The Lower Austrian Football Association was founded as an independent federation in the 1922. Before this time, it was a part of the Austrian Football Association, which also was the organizer of the Austrian Championships and the Austrian Cup. Although the NÖFV had a joint management with the Austrian Football Association, it organized, for the 1922–23 season, the first Lower Austrian Championship. The football cup was introduced by the NÖFV in 1926 and carried out for the first time in 1927. After the temporary union of the Vienna Football Association and the NÖFV, the competition was set and reintroduced in 1931. With a few brief interruptions, the football cup was held yearly until 1941, until it had to be stopped because of World War II.

As part of the "Bundesländer Cup", the competition was reintroduced after the war's end in 1946. As the "Bundesländer-Cup" was abolished, the NÖFV was the first Austrian national association in 1951 to decide to hold the cup competition indefinitely. In 1970, the NÖFV was again the first Austrian association to reintroduce the football cup. Due to the decreasing level of interest among viewers, it was discontinued in 1976.

=== The Meistercup since 1983 ===
In 1983 the NÖFV decided to introduce a reformed cup competition. Instead of the former Landescup, the champions of the individual leagues, beginning with the lower divisions, participate in the Meistercup every year since 1984.
