= Giovanni Kotchev =

Austrian-Bulgarian footballer

Personal information
- Date of birth: 30 May 1999 (age 27)
- Place of birth: Vienna, Austria
- Height: 1.88 m (6 ft 2 in)
- Position: Midfielder

Team information
- Current team: USC Grafenwörth
- Number: 10

Youth career
- 2005–2008: Casino Baden
- 2008–2012: St. Pölten
- 2012–2013: AKA St. Pölten
- 2013–2015: Admira Wacker
- 2016–2017: Union Berlin

Senior career*
Years	Team	Apps	(Gls)
2018	Neusiedl am See	13	(1)
2018–2019	SV Horn	13	(1)
2019	FC Mauerwerk	8	(0)
2020–2021	St. Pölten II		
2021–	USC Grafenwörth		
- * Club domestic league appearances and goals as of 20:11, 5 March 2023 (UTC)

Giovanni Kotchev (born 30 May 1999) is an Austrian-Bulgarian footballer who plays as a midfielder for Austrian side USC Grafenwörth.

== Career statistics ==
=== Club ===
As of 13 May 2020

Appearances and goals by club, season and competition
Club	Season	League			Cup		Continental		Other		Total	
Club	Season	Division	Apps	Goals	Apps	Goals	Apps	Goals	Apps	Goals	Apps	Goals
Neusiedl am See	2017–18	Austrian Regionalliga East	13	1	0	0	–		0	0	13	1
SV Horn	2018–19	2. Liga	13	1	1 (Note: Appearances in the Austrian Cup)	0	–		0	0	14	1
FC Mauerwerk	2019–20	Austrian Regionalliga East	8	0	1	0	–		0	0	9	0
Career total			34	2	2	0	0	0	0	0	36	2
