= Gerhard Kapl =

Austrian association football referee (1946–2011)

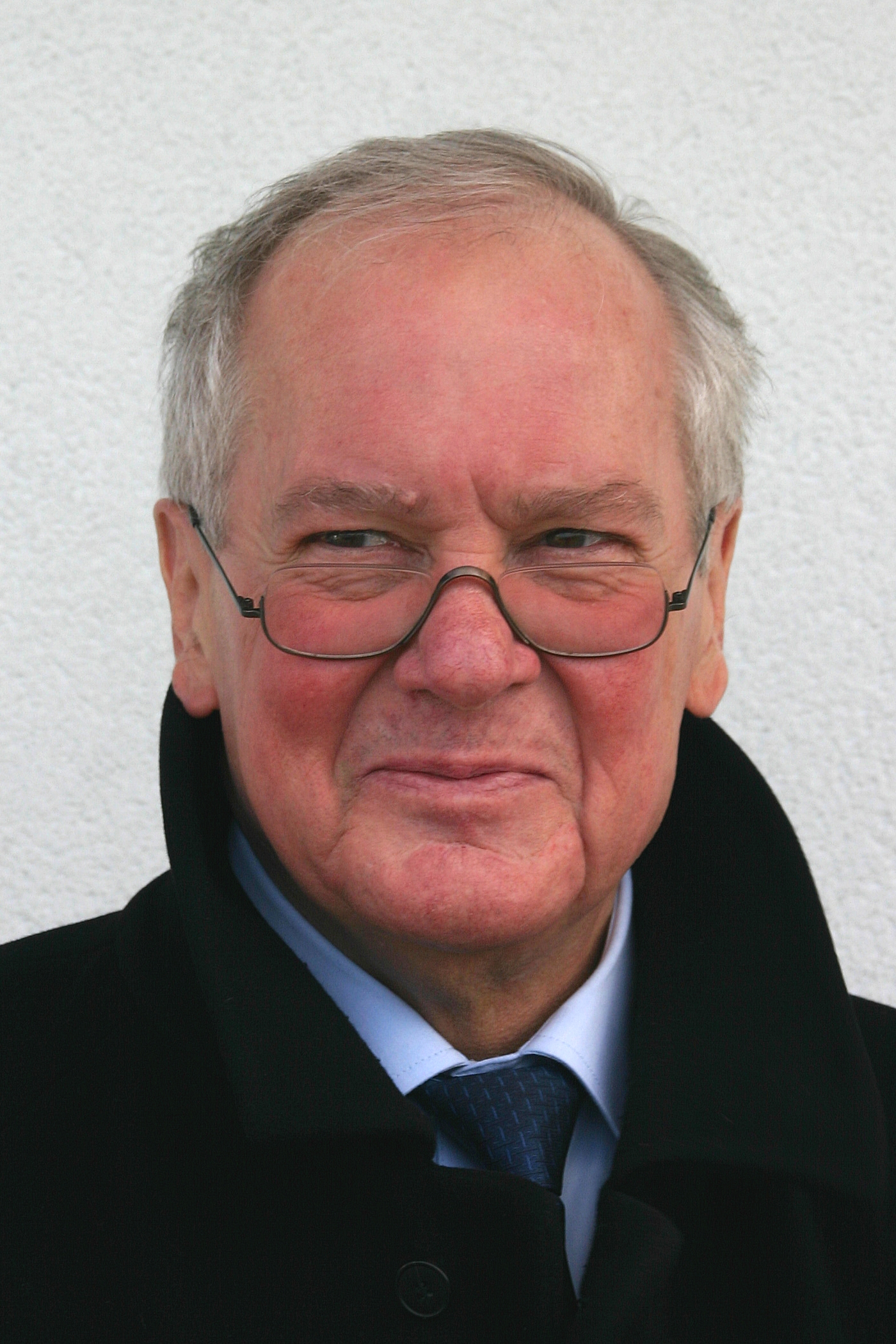
- Gerhard Kapl in May 2009
- Born: 11 November 1946; Wels, Austria
- Died: 25 July 2011 (aged 64); Graz, Austria
- Education: University of Graz
- Occupation: Civil servant
- Title: Vice-President of the Austrian Football Association
- Term: 2004–2009
- Children: 3

Gerhard Kapl (11 November 1946, in Wels – 25 July 2011, in Graz) was an Austrian state official, referee and football official.

== Life ==
Gerhard Kapl lost his father at an early age and grew up in poverty. Kapl completed the matura with distinction in 1965 at the High School of the Schlierbach Abbey and then studied jurisprudence, business administration and political science at the University of Graz. He completed all three courses in 1970, 1974 and 1974, with double magister degree and double doctorate.

After completing his studies, Kapl worked in the private sector. In 1977, he took a job in the state administration and completed his training year in the Feldbach District. In 1978 Kapl was entrusted with the construction, and later with the management, of a department for management of testing, inspection and complaints. In June 1994, he became head of accounting of the state of Styria. Kapl became Judge Advocate of the Styrian government in 1994, after he had already held the position of deputy from 1989 to 1993. Because of his success, Kapl received the professional title "Hofrat", the highest honor that can be given to a state official.

Kapl, who was considered a workaholic, began having health problems in 2009. During a critical heart operation, he received four bypasses. He died on 25 July 2011 following a diagnosed disease in autumn 2010. Kapl, who wanted to retire in 2011, was married, had three children and three grandchildren.

== Career in football ==
=== Football referee ===
In addition to his professional career Gerhard Kapl also had a successful career in football. At the age of 20, he passed the exam to become a football referee. Starting in 1980, he began refereeing games in the second division and three years later he referred games of the Austrian Football Bundesliga. On 30 September 1983, Kapl refereed the game of SC Eisenstadt against FC Linz, his first game in the highest Austrian league. Over the next ten seasons, he refereed 92 more games. On 28 November 1992, Kapl ended his career as a football referee with the game between SK Vorwärts Steyr and VfB Mödling (3:2) for reasons of age.

On 1 January 1988, Kapl became a FIFA referee and participated in 40 international games. Highlights in his international referee career was refereeing the European Cup game between Olympique de Marseille and AC Sparta Prague (3:2) on 23 October 1991 and the qualifier for the UEFA Euro 1992 between Greece and Finland (2:0) on 30 October 1991 at the Olympic Stadium in Athens.

=== Football official ===
Following his retirement as an active referee, Kapl started an even successful career as a football official. He became a member of the League Referees Committee in 1993. His international career as an official started in 1994 when he was employed as a delegate of the UEFA and FIFA for international matches. In 1997, Kapl was appointed Chairman of the Austrian Bundesliga Referees Committee.

Thanks to his legal knowledge, Kapl was entrusted in 1998 with the office of Inspector General of UEFA and therefore acted as "Attorney General" and "chief prosecutor". In this capacity, he was also actively working at the UEFA Euro 2004, the 2006 FIFA World Cup, the UEFA Euro 2008 and most recently the 2010 FIFA World Cup.

During the 2006 World Cup in Germany, Kapl was responsible for the security in eleven games, including the opening match between Germany and Costa Rica (4:2) in Munich and the final in Berlin between Italy and France (1:1 after overtime, 5:3 in the penalty shootout).

At the 2010 FIFA World Cup in South Africa, he was responsible for the security of the games in the FNB Stadium in Johannesburg, and therefore responsible for the opening match between South Africa and Mexico (1:1) and the final between the Netherlands and Spain (0:1 after overtime). In addition to several cases of doping and other offenses, the most spectacular case that Kapl had to work was the "spitting affairs" of Francesco Totti and Alexander Frei (both during the UEFA Euro 2004).

Kapl was disciplinary inspector and stadium expert for the UEFA. He put in nearly 600,000 air miles annually for the FIFA and UEFA.

In addition to these major events, other highlights of his official career were the UEFA Supercup final between Real Madrid C.F. and Feyenoord Rotterdam (in Monaco), the UEFA Europa League semi-finals between AC Milan and Borussia Dortmund, the UEFA Champions League semi-finals between Inter Milan and AC Milan, the UEFA Champions League semi-finals between AS Monaco and FC Chelsea, and the UEFA Champions League final between Liverpool FC and AC Milan (in Istanbul).

Overall Kapl was involved in more than 200 international matches as UEFA and FIFA delegate. Where he was in use in all 53 member countries of the UEFA.

He was elected in 1999 in his home land, by a large majority, for the position of President of the Styria Football Association (German: Steirischer Fußball-Verband, StFV). Kapl was re-elected three times in office, most recently on 29 January 2011. In 2003, he was elected vice-president of the Austrian Football Association (German: Österreichischer Fußball-Bund, ÖFB), where he was responsible for the legal, EU and referee affairs as well as the ÖFB Constitution. In 2004 Kapl was also chairman of the Referees Committee of the ÖFB.

The football world was deeply affected by Kapls death. Both the UEFA and the FIFA praised Kapl's successful operation as football referee and especially as a football official. FIFA president Sepp Blatter praised Gerhard Kapl for "many ways of excellent services" in a personal letter.

== Awards ==
- Silver Medal of the ÖFB for referees (June 2, 1989)
- Golden Medal of Honor of the ÖFB for referees (June 3, 1992)
- Golden Badge of Honor of the Styrian Football Association (March 15, 1986)
- Golden Medal of Honor of the Styrian Football Association (February 5, 1995)
- Sports Medal for special merits in Gold of the Province of Styria (3 December 2001)
- Grand Decoration of Styria (14 to December 2004)
- Grand Decoration of Honour for Services to the Republic of Austria (11 September 2010)
