= WFV =

WFV may refer to:

- Vienna Football Association (Wiener Fußball-Verband), the umbrella organization of the football clubs of the Austrian state Vienna
- Württemberg Football Association (Württembergischer Fußballverband), one of 21 state organisations of the German Football Association
