= Herbert Hübel =

Austrian lawyer and sports official (born 1958)

- Born: 10 January 1958 (age 68); Salzburg
- Occupation: Lawyer
- Title: President of the Salzburg Football Association
- Term: 2001–present

Herbert Hübel (born 10 January 1958 in Salzburg) is an Austrian lawyer and sports official.

Hübel has a doctorate in law and runs, alongside his partners, a law office in Salzburg. His father, who was also a lawyer, worked as a football official, too

Since 1984, Hübel has been an active in various functions of the Salzburg Football Association. In 1999, he was elected vice president of the association, and then became president of the Salzburg Football Association in 2001.

Hübel has been a member of the managing board of the Austrian Football Association (German: Österreichischer Fußball-Bund, ÖFB) since 1993. Since his election to president of the Salzburg Football Association, he has belonged to the presidium of the ÖFB. In autumn of 2008, he was a chairman of the selection committee for the new ÖFB President. Hübel was a board member of the EURO 2008 SA, which was responsible for the organization of the 2008 European Football Championship in Austria and Switzerland.

Hübel is a member of the Austrian Olympic Committee and was entrusted with the investigation of possible irregularities in connection with Salzburg's bid for the 2014 Winter Olympics.
