= Moravia and Silesia =

Moravia and Silesia may refer to:

- Moravian-Silesian Region, the first level administrative division of the Czech Republic
- Margraviate of Moravia and Austrian Silesia, the crown lands of the Lands of the Bohemian Crown
  - Moravia and Silesia national football team
