= Dražen Kekez =

Croatian footballer

Personal information
- Date of birth: 16 May 1995 (age 31)
- Position: Midfielder

Team information
- Current team: SV Wörgl
- Number: 21

Youth career
- –2006: SK Rum
- 2006–2008: FC Wacker Innsbruck
- 2008–2009: SK Rum
- 2009–2013: AKA Tirol

Senior career*
Years	Team	Apps	(Gls)
2013–2014	SK Rum		
2014–2015	SV Hall		
2015–2019	WSG Wattens	87	(7)
2019–	Wörgl	73	(9)
- * Club domestic league appearances and goals as of 29 September 2017

Dražen Kekez (born 16 May 1995) is a Croatian football player. He plays for Austrian side SV Wörgl.

== Club career ==
He made his Austrian Football First League debut for WSG Wattens on 22 July 2016 in a game against FC Blau-Weiß Linz.
