= Ryszard Błachut =

Polish footballer (1948–2017)

Personal information
- Date of birth: 14 September 1948
- Place of birth: Maków Podhalański, Poland
- Date of death: 16 June 2017 (aged 68)
- Place of death: Vienna, Austria
- Height: 1.78 m (5 ft 10 in)
- Position: Forward

Youth career
- Skawa Wadowice

Senior career*
Years	Team	Apps	(Gls)
1970–1977	ROW Rybnik	136	(30)
1978–1979	GKS Jastrzębie		
1979–1980	First Vienna FC	9	(3)

International career
- Silesia
- * Club domestic league appearances and goals

Ryszard Błachut (14 September 1948 – 16 June 2017) was a Polish footballer who played as a forward for ROW Rybnik, GKS Jastrzębie and Austrian club First Vienna FC.

== Early life ==
Błachut was born 1948 in Maków Podhalański, Poland, and started playing football at a young age before attending high school at the School Complex No. 2 in Wadowice.

== Club career ==
Błachut started his career with Polish side ROW Rybnik, where he was regarded as a fan favorite and "exceptional striker". Altogether, he made 136 league appearances and scored 30 goals in the Polish Ekstraklasa, the Polish top flight. After that, he signed for Austrian side First Vienna FC, where he was teammates with Austria international Hans Krankl.

== International career ==
Błachut played for the Silesia national team.

== Style of play ==
Błachut mainly operated as a striker and was known for his ability to score goals with headers.

== Death ==
Błachut died on 16 June 2017 in Vienna, Austria.
