= Florian Anderle =

Austrian association football player

Personal information
- Date of birth: 26 June 1990 (age 36)
- Place of birth: Austria
- Height: 1.93 m (6 ft 4 in)
- Position: Centre-back

Team information
- Current team: SV Heldenberg (player); LASK (U18 assistant coach)
- Number: 6

Youth career
- 1996–2001: SV Zwiersdorf
- 2001–2002: SPI Hollabrunn
- 2002–2003: ATSV Hollabrunn
- 2003–2004: FK Blau-Weiß Hollabrunn
- 2004–2008: SV Horn

Senior career*
Years	Team	Apps	(Gls)
2008–2014	SK Eggenburg		
2014	USC Grafenwörth		
2014–2018	SC Retz	108	(12)
2018–2019	Floridsdorfer AC	14	(1)
2019–2020	SC Retz	26	(1)
2020–2021	SV Stockerau		
2021–2022	Wacker Innsbruck II	20	(2)
2022	Wacker Innsbruck	2	(0)
2022–	SV Heldenberg		

Managerial career
- 2012–2016: SV W4IT Ziersdorf (youth coach)
- 2020–2021: St. Pölten (athletic coach)
- 2021–2022: Wacker Innsbruck III (assistant)
- 2022: Wacker Innsbruck II (assistant)
- 2022: SV Heldenberg (individual coach)
- 2022–2023: SV Heldenberg
- 2023–: LASK (U18 assistant)
- * Club domestic league appearances and goals as of 20:56, 5 March 2023 (UTC)

Florian Anderle (born 26 June 1990) is an Austrian footballer who plays for SV Heldenberg.

== Club career ==
=== Floridsdorfer AC ===
In June 2018, Anderle moved to Austrian 2. liga club Floridsdorfer AC, arriving alongside Burak Yilmaz. In January 2019, Anderle dissolved his contract with the club.

== Coaching career ==
Alongside his playing career, Anderle also served as youth coach in SV W4IT Ziersdorf from 2012 to 2016. Anderle spent the next four years as a freelance coach at GoalGetterAkademie in Wien.

From July 2020 to February 2021, he worked as an athletic coach at the academy of St. Pölten. Ahead of the 2021/22 season, Anderle began playing for FC Wacker Innsbruck's reserve team. At the same time, he also became coach of the club's 3rd senior team ahead of the 2021/22 season.

On 3 June 2022, FC Wacker Innsbruck confirmed that Thomas Löffler, with Anderle as his assistant coach, would take charge of the clubs reserve team until the end of the season. In July 2022, Anderle joined SV Heldenberg, where he both functioned as a player and as an individual coach. On 29 September 2022, he was named new manager of Heldenberg.

In January 2023, Anderle was hired as U18 assistant manager at LASK.
