= Dino Bevab =

Bosnian-Herzegovinian footballer

Personal information
- Full name: Dino Bevab
- Date of birth: 13 January 1993 (age 33)
- Place of birth: Sarajevo, Bosnia and Herzegovina
- Height: 1.75 m (5 ft 9 in)
- Position: Left back

Team information
- Current team: SV Wörgl
- Number: 30

Youth career
- 1999–2009: Bubamara
- 2009–2012: Zagreb

Senior career*
Years	Team	Apps	(Gls)
2011–2016	Zagreb	82	(1)
2016	Željezničar Sarajevo	6	(0)
2017–2018	Olimpik Sarajevo	11	(0)
2018–2019	Čelik Zenica	29	(1)
2019	Tuzla City	11	(0)
2019–	SV Wörgl	25	(1)

International career
2009–2010	Bosnia and Herzegovina U17	10	(1)
2010–2012	Bosnia and Herzegovina U19	9	(0)
2012–2013	Bosnia and Herzegovina U21	5	(0)

Managerial career
- 2023-: SV Wörgl
- * Club domestic league appearances and goals as of 30 January 2021

Dino Bevab (born 13 January 1993) is a Bosnian professional football manager and former player who is the manager of Austrian SV Wörgl.

== Club career ==
After spells in Croatia and his homeland, he joined SV Wörgl in July 2019.

== Honours ==
=== Club ===
Zagreb

- Croatian Second League: 2013–14
