= Związek Polski Piłki Nożnej =

- Short name: ZPPN
- Founded: 25 June 1911; 113 years ago
- Folded: 16 May 1920; 104 years ago
- Headquarters: Kraków (1911); Lwów (1912–1920)
- Membership: Austrian Football Association (1911–1918)
- Polish Football Association (1918–1920)

The original Polish Football Association (Polish: Związek Polski Piłki Nożnej (Note: Sometimes referred to as Polski Związek Piłki Nożnej)), abbreviated ZPPN, also known in Austria as German Football Association for Poland (Austrian German: Deutscher Fußball-Verband für Polen) was the governing body of association football in the Kingdom of Galicia and Lodomeria, the Cisleithanian crown land of Austria-Hungary. Founded on 25 June 1911 in Lwów, it organised the Galician Football Championship and the Galicia national football team. The association was part of the federal Austrian Football Association, it was however not a member of FIFA. After Poland regained independence following World War I, the organization was renamed to Lesser Poland Football Association (Polish: Małopolski Związek Piłki Nożnej) and joined the modern Polish Football Association as a regional association for Lesser Poland. The organization was dissolved on May 16, 1920 and therefore it is not the same entity as the current-day Lesser Poland Football Association.

== History ==
The founding assembly was held on 25 June 1911 in Lwów and the association was formally registered on 13 December 1911. Kraków was chosen as the first headquarters location, however, it was relocated to Lwów the following year. The founding clubs were Czarni Lwów, Pogoń Lwów, Cracovia and RKS Kraków. The association was part of the federal Austrian Football Association, which guaranteed ZPPN autonomy but it was not a member of FIFA. Despite that, the by-law stated that any conflicts between ZPPN and ÖFB shall be settled by FIFA. Interestingly many Poles were members of the ÖFB executive, including Stanisław Kopernicki who was appointed the vice-president of ÖFB. Also, the representative of ZPPN was given one of ÖFB's four places at the FIFA Congress.

At first, ZPPN was not joined by clubs of Jewish and Ukrainian minorities, but in 1913, 24 clubs, including minorities, were members of ZPPN (4 of them played in Klasa I, and the rest in Klasa II). ZPPN's first competition, the 1912 Klasa I play-offs was disrupted and abandoned. Next year the association successfully organized the 1913 Galician Football Championship and Klasa II promotion play-offs, as well as the national team match against the team of Silesia and Moravia. 1914 Galician Football Championship and Klasa II play-offs were disrupted by the outbreak of World War I.

After Poland regained independence, ZPPN joined the modern Polish Football Association as the regional association for Lesser Poland under the name Lesser Poland Football Association.

== Executive ==
=== Presidents of organizing committee ===
- Stanisław Kopernicki (interim, 25 July 1911 – 23 November 1911)
- Ludwik Żeleński (acting, 23 November 1911 – 21 January 1912)

=== Presidents ===
- Ludwik Żeleński (21 January 1912 – 23 February 1913)
- Ludwik Christelbauer (23 February 1913 – 30 November 1919, resigned)
- Edward Cetnarowski (30 November 1919 – 16 May 1920)
