= Tomasz Moskal =

Polish footballer

Personal information
- Date of birth: 8 July 1975 (age 51)
- Place of birth: Wrocław, Poland
- Height: 1.91 m (6 ft 3 in)
- Position: Forward

Senior career*
Years	Team	Apps	(Gls)
1992–1993	Pafawag Wrocław		
1993–1997	Śląsk Wrocław	93	(10)
1997–1998	GKS Katowice	30	(9)
1998–2000	Polonia Warsaw	42	(10)
2000–2001	Lechia Gdańsk	16	(6)
2001	Górnik Polkowice	?	(4)
2001	Polonia Warsaw	8	(1)
2002	GKS Bełchatów	?	(4)
2002–2006	Górnik Polkowice	95	(26)
2006	Jagiellonia Białystok	14	(4)
2006–2008	Górnik Zabrze	44	(5)
2008–2009	Odra Wodzisław Śląski	21	(3)
2009–2010	Zakynthos		
2011	Nadwiślan Góra		
2014–2016	Malinka Malin		
2016–2017	Sudety Giebułtów		
2017	Bystrzyca Kąty Wrocławskie	3	(2)
2022	Parasol Wrocław	2	(0)

International career
2006	Silesia	1	(0)
- * Club domestic league appearances and goals

Tomasz Moskal (born 8 July 1975) is a Polish former professional footballer who played as a forward.

== Honours ==
Polonia Warsaw

- Ekstraklasa: 1999–2000
- Polish League Cup: 1999–2000

Górnik Polkowice

- II liga: 2002–03

Sudety Giebułtów

- Regional league Jelenia Góra: 2016–17

Individual

- II liga top scorer: 2002–03
