= Andrew Barsalona =

Canadian soccer player (born 1990)

Personal information
- Full name: Andrew Victor Barsalona
- Date of birth: 3 August 1990 (age 36)
- Place of birth: Toronto, Ontario, Canada
- Height: 1.77 m (5 ft 10 in)
- Position: Midfielder

Youth career
- Oakville SC

College career
Years	Team	Apps	(Gls)
2008–2009	UAB Blazers		

Senior career*
Years	Team	Apps	(Gls)
2011	Hamilton Rage FC	9	(0)
2012	Eintracht Braunschweig II	6	(1)
2012–2013	Germania Halberstadt II	0	(0)
2013–2014	VPS	2	(0)
2016	Þróttur Reykjavík		
2018–2020	Unión Puerto	27	(2)
2020–2021	Brandenburger SC Süd 05	4	(0)
2021	FC Mauerwerk	11	(0)
2022	FC Mauerwerk II		
2022–2023	1860 Rosenheim	22	(0)
- * Club domestic league appearances and goals as of 09:48, 10 March 2024 (UTC)

Andrew Victor Barsalona (born 3 August 1990) is a Canadian soccer player who plays as a midfielder.

== Career ==
Before the second half of 2011–12, Barsalona signed for German fifth division side Eintracht Braunschweig II. After that, he signed for Germania Halberstadt II in the German sixth division. In 2014, Barsalona signed for Finnish top flight club VPS, where he made two league appearances. On 14 September 2014, he debuted for VPS during a 3–3 draw with Jaro. In 2018, he signed for Unión Puerto in Spain. In 2020, Barsalona signed for German team Brandenburger SC Süd 05. In 2021, he signed for FC Mauerwerk in Austria.
