= FC Mauerwerk =

- Full name: Fußballclub Mauerwerk
- Founded: 2 August 2014; 11 years ago as Fußballclub Karabakh Wien
- Ground: Rudolf-Tonn-Stadion
- Capacity: 7,000
- Owner: Mauerwerk Immobilien GmbH
- Chairman: Mustafa Elnimr
- Head Coach: Norbert Schweitzer
- League: Regionalliga Ost
- 2018–19: 2nd
- Website: www.fckarabakh.at
Home colours	Away colours

Fußballclub Mauerwerk is an Austrian association football club from the capital city of Vienna. From September 2014 to June 2018, the club played under the name FC Karabakh Wien. Currently playing in the Regionalliga Ost and plays their home games at the Rudolf-Tonn-Stadion in Schwechat.

== History ==
=== Founding ===
Fußballclub Karabakh Wien was founded on August 2, 2014, and officially registered in 2014 in the Wien Football Association (WFV) and has obtained a license to compete in Oberliga A Wien. Oberliga is officially the 3rd tier of the Wien Football Association and the 6th tier of Austrian Football Association.

=== Oberliga ===
==== 2014–15 season ====
In the 2014–15 season, Karabakh Wien has scored 55 points at the end of the season with 17 wins, 2 draws and 7 defeats from 26 games in Vienna at Oberliga A Wien and finished second behind Wiener SC II in a total of 14 clubs, and with that result did not get access to the 2. Landesliga Wien, so the club decided to buy the SC Kaiserebersdorf-Srbija to secure a place in the top league, moved to Kaiserebersdorf, and played the season 2015–16 in 2. Landesliga Wien. In the same season, the club took part in the Wien Cup and scored 5 consecutive victories. The results obtained for a newly established club have been highly appreciated by local experts.

=== 2. Landesliga ===
==== 2015–16 season ====
It started in the 2. Landesliga Wien, which is a major league than the 2014–15 season. The 2. Landesliga Wien is officially the 2nd league of the Wien Football Association, and the 5th league of the Austrian Football Association. Despite the fact that the board of directors played for the first time in this league before the main team, the main goal was simply a championship. Thus, Karabakh Wien won 30 wins in 2. Landesliga Wien, gaining 67 points as a result of 21 wins, 4 draws and 5 defeats and champions the 4 points ahead of the closest spectator in the league where 16 teams fought.

In the same season, the club has achieved great success, as well as parallel to the Wien Cup. In the Wien Cup, where 289 clubs from the Wien Football Association participated, our club rose to the finals and became the champion, winning a 2–0 win over the other finalist SV Gersthof at the Ernst-Happel-Stadion, where the Austria national football team played home matches. Karabakh Wien has been the club for the first time in the history of 2. Landesliga Wien, winning the league and city trophy for the same season. The club has brought the U18 team to the third round of the season. So, in 2015–16, the Karabakh Wien played a historic season by printing 3 championships to Wien's asset.

=== Landesliga ===
==== 2016–17 season ====
In the 2016–17 season Karabakh Wien will start fighting in the highest city league in the city of Vienna. The Wiener Stadtliga is the 1st League of the Vienna Football Association and the 4th League of Austrian Football Association, where the club will be fighting this season. The club, which is seriously preparing for the season, will first be in the match on August 19, 2016. Karabakh Wien, which will hold 30 matches in 16 stadiums throughout the stadium, will be featured by local experts as the main nominees for the championship title.

During the 2016–17 season Karabakh Wien met with the Austrian club Rapid Wien, July 8, 2016, the first time Rapid won the Austrian Cup as the state champion of Wien and the 8th of July, 2016. In spite of the history, budget, or power ratio between the two clubs, Karabakh Wien suffered a surprisingly fierce battle with the local community in Vienna and lost 3–1 to Rapid Wien.

=== Regionalliga ===
==== 2017–18 season ====
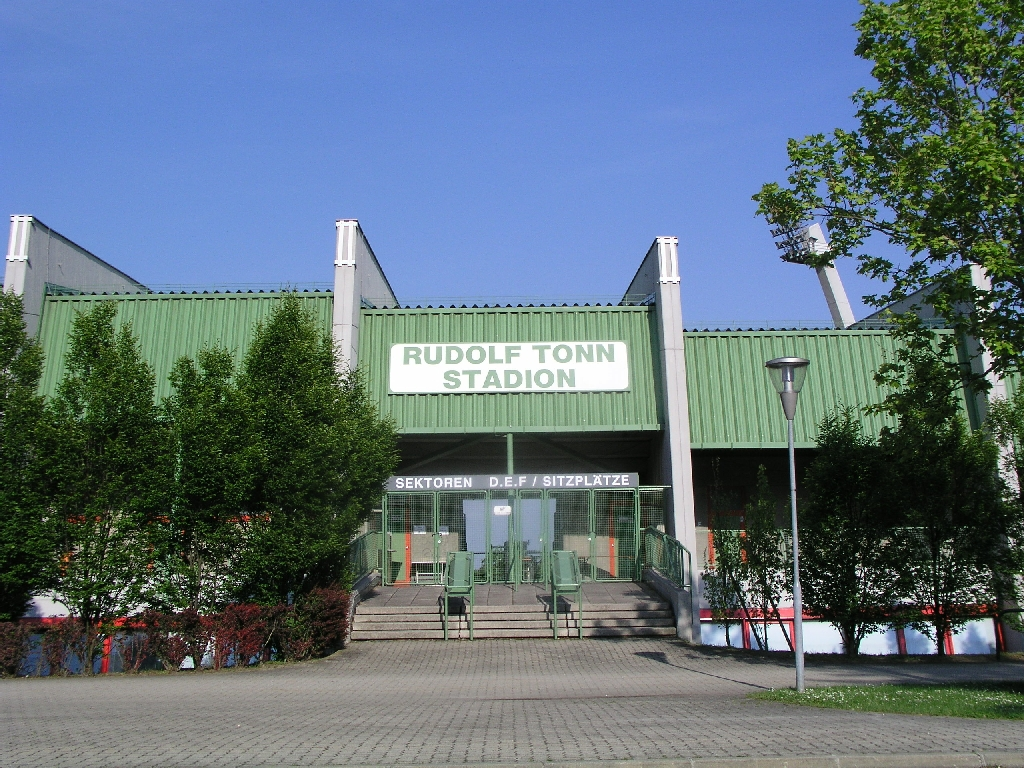
Entrance of the Rudolf-Tonn-Stadion, new stadium of Karabakh Wien from 2018

As master of the league of the viennese city, a rose in the regional league. Since September 2017, the football department has been transferred to FC Karabakh Wien GmbH. Since February 2018 leading the first team to play their home games at the Rudolf-Tonn-Stadion in Schwechat from.

=== Renamed to FC Mauerwerk ===
On 29 June 2018, it was announced that the previous Azerbaijani donors Orkhan Valiyev after the missed promotion to the new 2nd league and the club is taken over by the native Egyptian Mustafa Elnimr. Elnimr, who is already a sponsor of the Wiener Stadtliga club Mauerwerk Sport Admira, will not merge the two clubs but will continue Karabakh Wien as FC Mauerwerk. Masonry Sport will act as a satellite club of the FC Mauerwerk and introduce talents to the first team, because the club's goal is still the promotion to the 2. Liga.

== Players ==
=== Current squad ===
As of 25 September 2024.

Note: Flags indicate national team as defined under FIFA eligibility rules; some limited exceptions apply. Players may hold more than one non-FIFA nationality.

No.	Pos.	Nation	Player
1	GK	AUT	Ertan Uzun
3	DF	AUT	Marko Grubesic
4	DF	AUT	Clinton Osaro
5	DF	MKD	Leon Najdovski
6	MF	MNE	Jovan Batuta
7	MF	AUT	Dennis Schmutz
8	MF	FRA	Sailane Ousseni
9	MF	GER	Ertugrul Tuysuz
10	FW	AUT	Ali Sahintürk
11	MF	FRA	Julien Belinga Etoundi
13	FW	GEO	Sandro Kristianidi
17	MF	TOG	Mansour Kerime

No.	Pos.	Nation	Player
19	MF	MKD	Valdet Jakupi
21	DF	GHA	Abdullah Alhassan
22	MF	AUT	Nemanja Radivojevic
23	MF	MKD	Petar Ljamcevski
24	FW	FRA	Freud Codjo Gnindokponou
27	FW	AUT	Philipp Afuah
29	GK	CAN	Tristan Mitchell da Costa
—	DF	GHA	Sabitu Issah
—	DF	NGA	Kevin Elawure
—	MF	FRA	Brooklyn Barataud
—	FW	FRA	Wilfried Domoraud

=== Out on loan ===
Note: Flags indicate national team as defined under FIFA eligibility rules; some limited exceptions apply. Players may hold more than one non-FIFA nationality.

No.	Pos.	Nation	Player

=== Coaching staff ===
Position	Staff
Head coach	(Austria) Norbert Schweitzer
Assistant coach	(Austria) Murat Topal
Goalkeeper coach	(Austria) Predrag Kojic
Physiotherapist	(Austria) Seckin Ak
Massagist	(Austria) Gökce Tuna

== Notable players ==
=== Players with 45 or more league appearances ===
Statistics correct as of the end of the 2014–15 season.

- Appearance include league matches at amateur level in the Austrian football league system (Regionalliga East, Wiener Stadliga, 2. Landesliga Wien and Oberliga Wien).
- Appearance include substitute appearance.
- Players marked in **bold** are still playing in the professional team.

Name	Nationality	Position	Mauerwerk career	Appearances
Marko Stevanovic	Serbia	Defender	2015–2019	124
Ercan Kara	Austria	Forward	2016–2019	90
Nemanja Stojanovic	Serbia	Midfielder	2015–2019	84
**Erdal Kara**	Austria	Forward	2015–	80
Michael Harrauer	Austria	Goalkeeper	2015–2017	73
Aykut Tekinsoy	Austria	Defender	2015–2017	71
**Muhammed Ali Keskin**	Austria	Midfielder	2015–	62
Milan Sapardic	Austria	Midfielder	2015–2018	58
Sasa Sormaz	Austria	Defender	2014–2017	56
Turgay Gemicibasi	Germany	Midfielder	2017–2019	56
Taner Sen	Austria	Midfielder	2016–2019	55
Kenan Colakoglu	Austria	Forward	2014–2017	49
Aleksandar Ivanovic	Bosnia and Herzegovina	Defender	2015–2017	48

=== Captains ===
- Only captains in competitive matches are included.
- Players marked in **bold** are still playing in the professional team.

Captain	Nationality	Years
Sasa Sormaz	Austria	2014–2015
Michael Harrauer	Austria	2015–2017
Ümit Korkmaz	Austria	2018
Nemanja Stojanović	Serbia	2018–2019

== Coach history ==
No.	Head coach	Nationality	From	Until	Days
1	Ilija Sormaz	Austria	12 August 2014	30 June 2015	322
2	Hans Slunecko	Austria	1 July 2015	30 June 2016	365
3	Volkan Kahraman	Austria	1 July 2016	13 March 2018	620
4	Johann Kleer	Austria	14 March 2018	30 June 2019	473

== Past seasons ==
Season	League	Level	Place	Pld	W	D	L	GF	GA	GD	Pts	Austrian Cup
2014–15	Oberliga A Wien (VI)	6	2	26	17	2	7	94	35	+59	53	Did not qualify
2015–16	2. Landesliga Wien (V)	5	1	30	21	4	5	85	26	+59	67	Did not qualify
2016–17	Wiener Stadliga (IV)	4	1	30	21	8	1	80	21	+59	71	1st round
2017–18	Regionalliga Ost (III)	3	5	30	17	5	8	61	44	+17	56	1st round
2018–19	Regionalliga Ost (III)	3	2	30	20	5	5	64	29	35	65	1st round
2019–20	Regionalliga Ost (III)	3		30								
Green marks a season followed by promotion.

== Reserve team ==
=== History ===
Since the appearance of the first team in Regionalliga in 2017, the second men's team of the club participates in the regular operation of the game. She worked before in the reserve game operation of the city Wien. The second team initially played in Oberliga B Wien, which is the 3rd league of the Wien Football Association and the 6th league of Austrian Football Association.

The team's stadium is Sportplatz Kaiserebersdorf, where the first team played from 2015 until being promoted to Regionalliga, and much of the championship until moving in early 2018.

=== Current squad ===
Note: Flags indicate national team as defined under FIFA eligibility rules; some limited exceptions apply. Players may hold more than one non-FIFA nationality.

No.	Pos.	Nation	Player
—	MF	CAN	Andrew Barsalona

=== Coaching staff ===
Position	Staff
Head coach	(Austria) Rene Fellner
Assistant coach	(Austria) Turhan Bölükbas

=== Past seasons ===
Season	League	Level	Place	Pld	W	D	L	GF	GA	GD	Pts
2017–18	1. Klasse B Wien (VII)	7	1	24	21	1	2	115	20	95	64
2018–19	Oberliga B Wien (VI)	6		26							
Green marks a season followed by promotion.

== Youth academy ==
Football school consisted of 9 children, consisting of different age groups, U7, U9, U10, U11, U12, U13, U14, U16 and U18. In parallel, the fitness, mental and technical education base of the football school has been structured effectively and with the participation of experienced coaches to identify and develop children's full potential. The club's children-youth sports school consists of 200 younger and younger players from 20 different nationalities, a 25-man squadron and five additional technical staff. Mauerwerk football club has a favorable feature in Vienna football with a team of multicultural children-youth sports school.

== Honours ==
=== League ===
- Wiener Stadtliga: (IV)
  - Champions (1): 2016–17
- 2. Landesliga Wien: (V)
  - Champions (1): 2015–16
- Oberliga Wien: (VI)
  - Runners-up (1): 2014–15
- 1. Klasse Wien: (VII)
  - Champions (1): 2017–18 ‡

^{‡} Reserve team

=== Cup ===
- Wien Cup:
  - Champions (1): 2015–16
  - Semi-finalist (1): 2014–15

=== Youth league ===
- U18 C-Liga
  - Champions (1): 2015–16
- U16 C-Liga
  - Champions (1): 2016–17
- U14 B-Liga
  - Champions (1): 2017–18
