= Gerhard Milletich =

Austrian entrepreneur and soccer official

Gerhard Milletich (born 1956) is an Austrian media entrepreneur and soccer official. He was the president of the Austrian Football Association from 2021 to 2023.

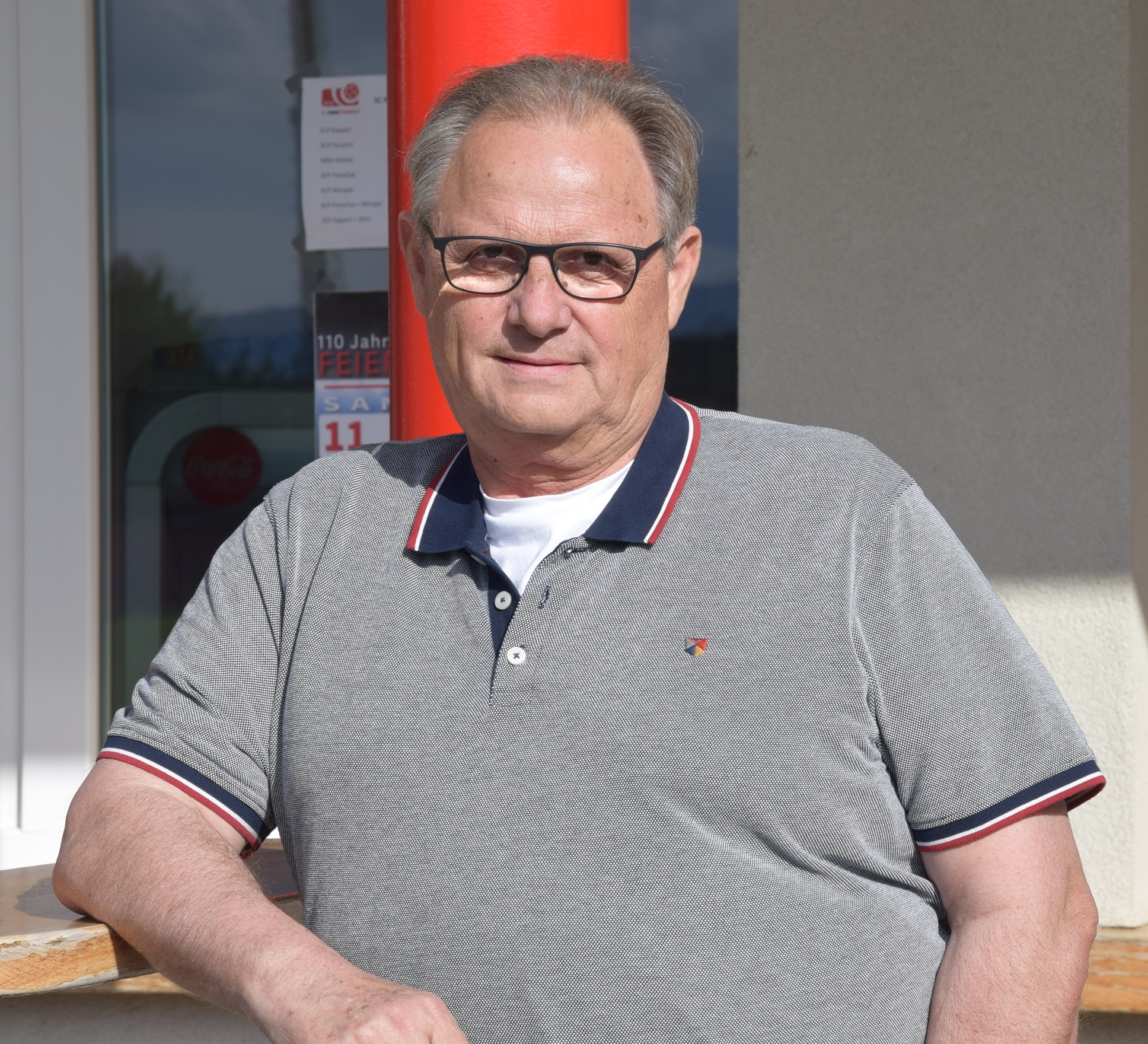
Gerhard Milletich (2022)

== Life ==
In 1985 Milletich joined the Compress Group, a publishing house of which he became managing director in 1990. When the Compress Group was sold to Bohmann Publishing in 1999, he became its co-managing director. In 2004, together with his co-managing director Gabriele Ambros, he bought the publishing house from its previous owner, the Dutch group Wolters Kluwer, and has since held a 50 percent stake in it. In 2011, under his leadership, Bohmann-Verlag took over Burgenländische Kabelfernsehen (BKF) and converted it into the regional broadcaster for the eastern region Schau TV, but sold it to KURIER Medienhaus in 2017 due to economic problems. In May 2020, it was announced that Milletich would move part of Bohmann-Verlag to his home municipality of Parndorf, and the topping-out ceremony for the media house in Parndorf was held in September of the same year.

In 2013, Milletich was granted the right to use the professional title Kommerzialrat due to his economic merits. He is married and has a daughter. Politically, he is by self-definition closer to the Social Democratic Party of Austria than to the turquoise Austrian People's Party, he also ran in 2012 on a rear list position of the Social Democratic Party of Austria for the Parndorf municipal council.

Gerhard Milletich is a member of the Burgenland Croatian ethnic group.

== Involvement as a soccer official ==
In 1993 Milletich became chairman of SC-ESV Parndorf, he held this position for 27 years until 2020. During this time, Milletich succeeded, among other things, the promotion to the Austrian Regionalliga East and subsequently twice to the Erste Liga, in which the club played a total of 3 seasons (2006/2007, 2007/2008, 2013/2014).

In 2012, Milletich became president of the Burgenland Football Association in addition to his chairmanship at SC/ESV Parndorf.

In September 2021, Milletich prevailed over his opponent, businessman Roland Schmid, in a tight vote in the ÖFB Election Committee for the office of ÖFB president in the 2nd round of voting with 7 to 3 votes, after there was a 5 to 5 stalemate in the 1st round.

On 17 October 2021, he was finally elected by the Ordinary Federal General Assembly of the ÖFB as its president for 4 years. He resigned from this office in January 2023. In the run-up to his resignation, allegations of corruption had been made.
