= Wilfried Domoraud =

French footballer (born 1988)

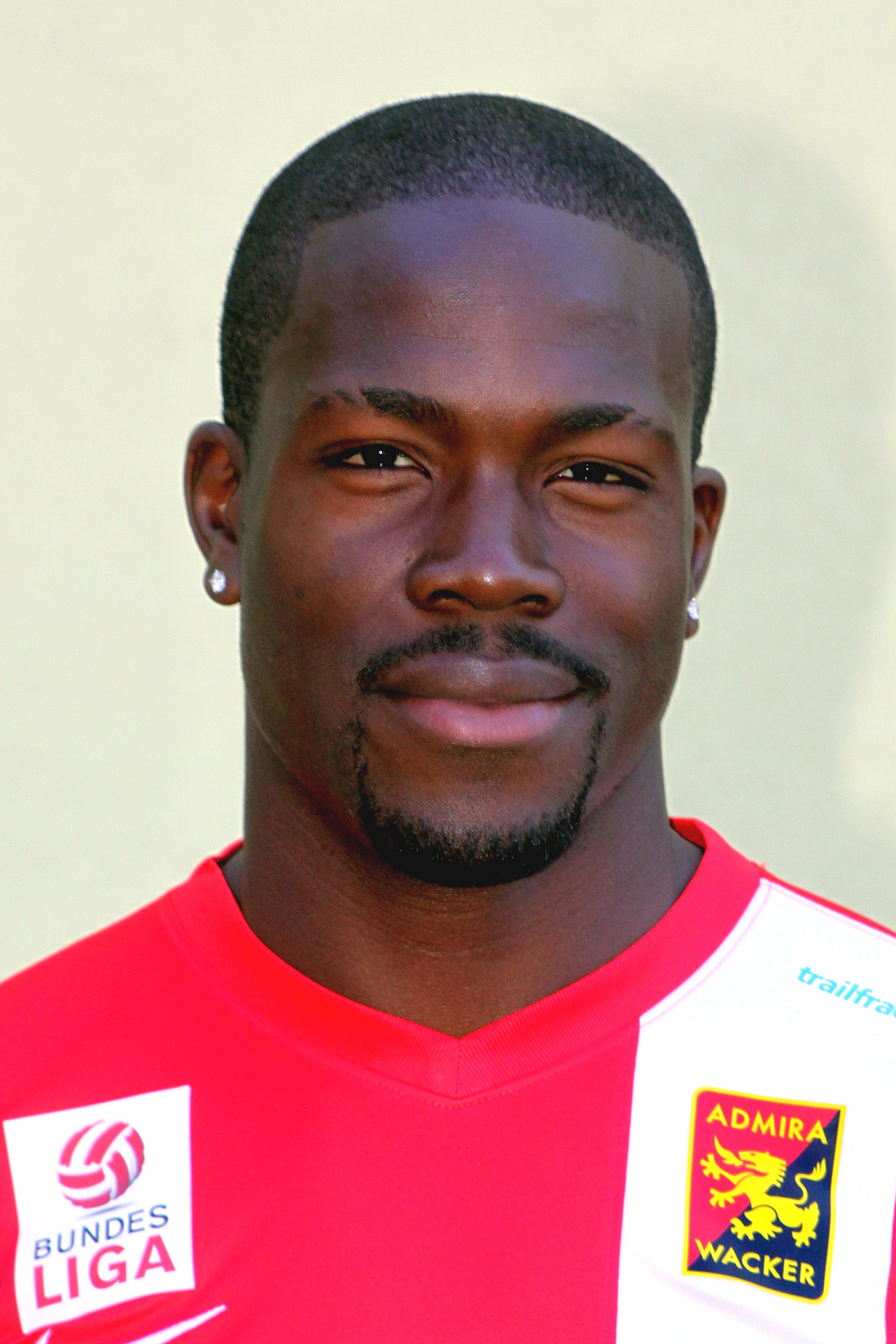
- Domoraud with Admira Wacker

Personal information
- Full name: Wilfried Domoraud
- Date of birth: 18 August 1988 (age 38)
- Place of birth: Maisons-Alfort, France
- Height: 6 ft 0 in (1.83 m)
- Position: Winger

Team information
- Current team: FC Mauerwerk
- Number: 7

Senior career*
Years	Team	Apps	(Gls)
2005–2007	AS Nancy B	12	(0)
2007–2008	Yeovil Town	5	(0)
2008	→ Weymouth (loan)	4	(0)
2008	→ Weston-super-Mare (loan)	14	(5)
2008–2009	Woking	38	(8)
2010	Dornbirn	15	(4)
2010–2011	TSV Hartberg	26	(0)
2011–2013	SV Mattersburg	24	(0)
2013–2015	Admira Wacker	38	(7)
2015	Arles-Avignon	13	(0)
2016–2018	Hobro IK	41	(8)
2019–2020	Hamrun Spartans	30	(11)
2020	Gżira United	6	(1)
2020–2021	Sirens	23	(8)
2021–2022	Hibernians	25	(4)
2022–	FC Mauerwerk	54	(16)
- * Club domestic league appearances and goals as of 28 June 2024

Wilfried Domoraud (born 18 August 1988) is a French footballer who plays for Austrian club FC Mauerwerk.

== Career ==
Born in Maisons-Alfort, Val-de-Marne, Domoraud was previously contracted to French club AS Nancy, but only appeared for their B team. After scoring a hat-trick for the Yeovil Town reserve team he was handed his first team debut when he came on as a substitute at Brighton & Hove Albion in a 2–1 win.

Domoraud was sent on a month's loan to Conference National side Weymouth in January 2008. He appeared in four league games for the club in January, as well as an FA Trophy match. Despite having five total appearances for the club, he failed to get on the score sheet during the loan spell. He was loaned out again on 13 February 2008, this time to Conference South side Weston-super-Mare. The loan was eventually extended to the end of the 2007–08 season, with Domoraud making 14 league appearances, scoring five goals in the process.

He was released by Yeovil in July, before signing for Woking on a non-contract deal on 1 September 2008 following a trial. He signed a contract with Woking in October. Manager Phil Gilchrist rated Domoraud at a price of £250,000 during the January 2009 transfer window, amid interest from other clubs. His first competitive hat trick for Woking came on 31 January 2009 when Woking beat Northwich Victoria 4–1 at Kingfield Stadium. His first hat trick was for Yeovil reserves in the 2007–08 season. He re-signed for Woking on 1 October 2009 on a non-contract deal. He made his debut in a 2–0 victory over Chelmsford City, scoring the opening goal.

== Personal life ==
Domoraud holds both French and Ivorian nationalities.

== Club statistics ==
As of 22 May 2015.

Appearances and goals by club, season and competition
Club	Season	League			Cup		League Cup		Europe		Total	
Club	Season	Division	Apps	Goals	Apps	Goals	Apps	Goals	Apps	Goals	Apps	Goals
Yeovil Town	2007–08	Football League	5	0	0	0	0	0	–		5	0
Yeovil Town	Total		5	0	0	0	0	0	0	0	5	0
Woking	2008–09	Football Conference	38	8	0	0	0	0	–		38	8
Woking	Total		38	8	0	0	0	0	0	0	38	8
Dornbirn	2009–10	Austrian Football First League	15	4	1	0	0	0	–		16	4
Dornbirn	Total		15	4	1	0	0	0	0	0	16	4
Hartberg	2010–11	Austrian Football First League	26	0	3	1	0	0	–		29	1
Hartberg	Total		26	0	3	1	0	0	0	0	29	1
Mattersburg	2011–12	Austrian Football Bundesliga	14	0	2	0	0	0	–		16	0
Mattersburg	2012–13	Austrian Football Bundesliga	10	0	0	0	0	0	–		10	0
Mattersburg	Total		24	0	2	0	0	0	0	0	26	0
Admira Wacker	2013–14	Austrian Football Bundesliga	34	7	4	0	0	0	–		38	7
Admira Wacker	2014–15	Austrian Football Bundesliga	4	0	2	0	0	0	–		6	0
Admira Wacker	Total		38	7	6	0	0	0	0	0	44	7
Arles-Avignon	2014–15	Ligue 2	13	0	0	0	0	0	–		13	0
Arles-Avignon	Total		13	0	0	0	0	0	0	0	0	0
Career total			159	19	12	1	0	0	0	0	171	20
