= Rudolf-Tonn-Stadion =

Football stadium in Schwechat, Austria

Coordinates: 48°07′45″N 16°28′07″E

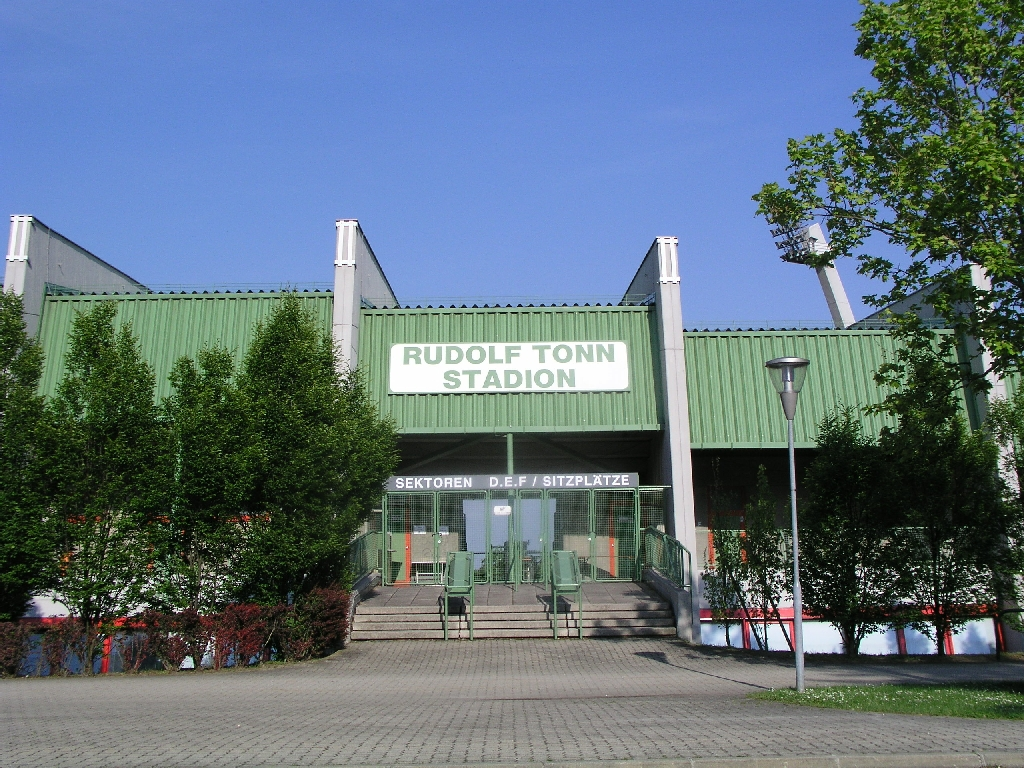
- Interactive map of Rudolf-Tonn-Stadion
- Full name: Rudolf-Tonn-Stadion
- Location: Schwechat, Austria
- Capacity: 7,000

Construction
- Built: 1977 - 1980
- Opened: 24 May 1980
- Renovated: 2003
- Cost: 11,7 Mill. Euro
- Architects: Seliger & Hums

Tenants
- SV Schwechat; FC Mauerwerk

Rudolf-Tonn-Stadion, (Schwechat-Rannerdorf) is a multi-use-stadium in Rannersdorf, a city subdivision of Schwechat, Austria. The stadium seats 7000 with additional room for standing spectators around the playing field.

== History ==
The stadium is the home ground of SV Schwechat and Karabakh Wien. Named after the former mayor of Schwechat Rudolf Tonn. The opening match was FK Austria Wien vs. First Vienna FC. It has also occasionally played host to Austrian Football League matches and track and field athletics.
