= SV Wörgl =

Austrian football club

- Full name: Sportverein Wörgl
- Founded: 9 April 1952; 72 years ago
- Ground: Sportzentrum Wörgl
- Capacity: 3,500
- Chairman: Andreas Widschwenter
- Manager: Dino Bevab
- League: Regionalliga Tirol
- 2023–24: Regionalliga Tirol, 12th of 12 (Note: SV Wörgl avoided relegation due to the Regionalliga Tirol expanding from 12 to 14 teams for the 2024–25 season.)

Sportverein Wörgl is an Austrian association football club from Wörgl. The team currently competes in the Regionalliga Tirol, one of the third tiers of Austrian football.

== History ==
Founded in 1952, they played in the Tiroler League until 1992 when they clinched promotion to the third tier Austrian Regionalliga. In 1998 they were promoted to the 2. Liga after beating VSE Sankt Pölten on penalties. However, they were demoted to the 4th tier Landesliga in 2005 after losing their licence.

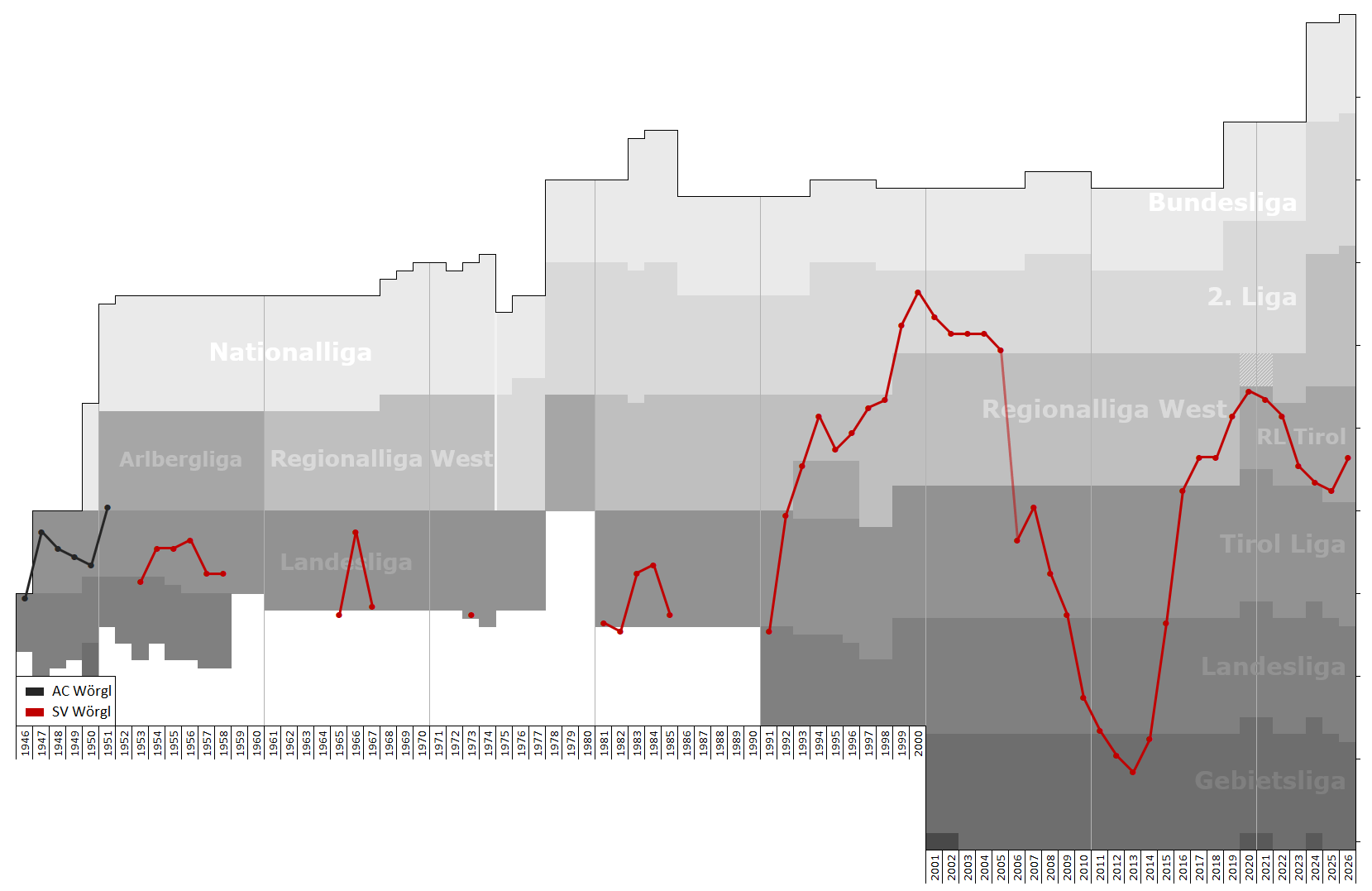
Historical chart of the club's league performance

== Honours ==
- Austrian Regionalliga West: 1

1998

== Players ==
=== Current squad ===
As of 4 November 2024

Note: Flags indicate national team as defined under FIFA eligibility rules; some limited exceptions apply. Players may hold more than one non-FIFA nationality.

No.	Pos.	Nation	Player
1	GK	(Austria) AUT	Aleksandar Topic
2	MF	(Hungary) HUN	Soma Molnár
3	DF	(Serbia) SRB	Aleksandar Markovic
5	DF	(Croatia) CRO	Denis Stojcic
6	MF	(Austria) AUT	Fabio Mitterer
7	FW	(Austria) AUT	Ömer Köken
8	MF	(Austria) AUT	Patrick Deutsch
9	FW	(Austria) AUT	Aleksandar Skrbo
10	DF	(Austria) AUT	Armin Krepatz
11	DF	(Austria) AUT	Matteo Schöbel
13	DF	(Bosnia and Herzegovina) BIH	Aleksandar Prodanovic
15	MF	(Croatia) CRO	Ivan Salinovic
16	MF	(Austria) AUT	Korbinian Kirchmair

No.	Pos.	Nation	Player
17	MF	(Austria) AUT	Muamer Music
18	FW	(Syria) SYR	Eshak Aljbarah
21	FW	(Austria) AUT	Tobias Schneeberger
24	MF	(Croatia) CRO	Drazen Kekez
26	MF	(Austria) AUT	Julian Schulnig
26	DF	(Hungary) HUN	Attila Havas
27	DF	(Austria) AUT	Julian Theuermann
28	DF	(Austria) AUT	Tobias Schulnig
31	FW	(Hungary) HUN	Dávid Martin
32	GK	(Austria) AUT	Esmin Hausic
45	GK	(Austria) AUT	Matteo Mitterer
45	MF	(Bosnia and Herzegovina) BIH	Eldin Sabic
—	DF	(Croatia) CRO	Gabriel Dzebic
