= Friedrich Stickler =

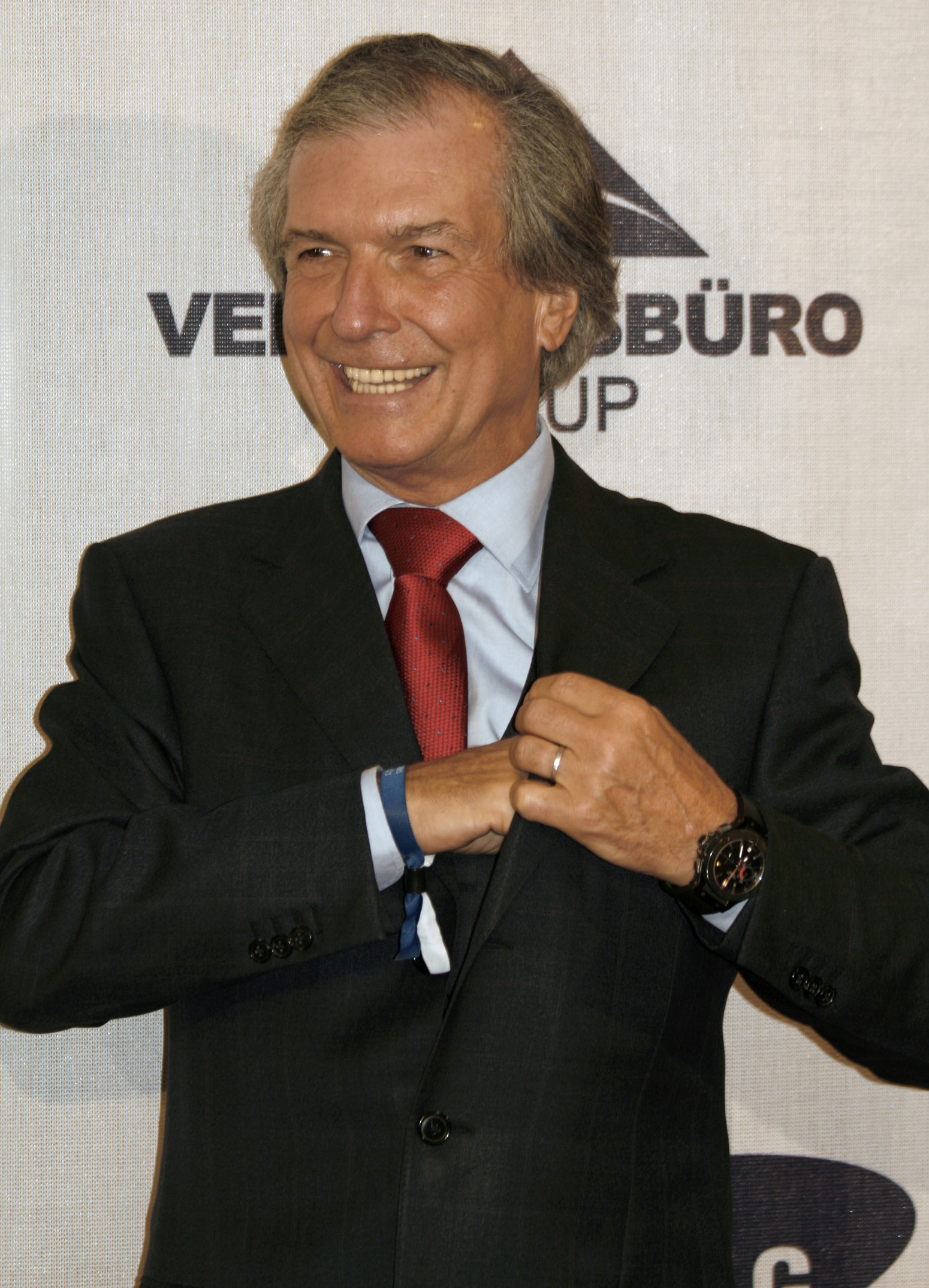
Friedrich Stickler (2008)

Friedrich Stickler (born 18 April 1949, in Vienna) is an Austrian manager and football administrator. He is Deputy Director General of the Austrian lotteries and board member of the Austrian Sports Aid. Stickler is the former president of Austrian Football Association and Organising Committee for the FIFA Club World Cup. He was also the chairman of the UEFA Club Competitions Committee before 2007 and co-opted member of the UEFA Executive Committee. From 2009 to 2015 he was president of the European Lotteries.

In his tenure as president of the Austrian Football Association, he was responsible for the successful bid, along with Switzerland, to host the UEFA Euro 2008

== Life and career ==
After completing his studies at the University of Natural Resources and Life Sciences in Vienna, Stickler worked for Casinos Austria. He took over the management of the ship casinos and directed the Executive Secretariat. In 1985 Stickler was involved as project director on the introduction of Lotto "6 out of 45" in Austria. Immediately after the founding of the Austrian Lotteries, Stickler was appointed to the board in 1986. Since 2002, Stickler has been member of the Austrian Federal Economic Chamber, and responsible for the professional group Casinos Austria and Austrian Lotteries. He has been Deputy Director General of the Austrian Lotteries since 2006.

Stickler was elected in 2009 as president of the European State Lotteries and Toto Association (European Lotteries), based in Lausanne, Switzerland. He was reelected twice. In 2015, Hansjörg Höltkemeier, CEO of Lotto Berlin and the Lotto Foundation took over this position from Stickler.

In 2015, Stickler was elected to the executive committee of the Global Lottery Monitoring System (GLMS) for sports betting. The object of GLMS is to combat match fixing and manipulation in international sports. In 2010, Stickler became the first Austrian in the "Lottery Industry Hall of Fame".

From 2002 to 2008, Stickler was president of the Austrian Football Association, from 2005 to 2009 an executive board member of the Austrian Olympic Committee, and co-opted member of the UEFA Executive Committee from 2007 to 2008. In 2002, he succeeded as ÖFB president, along with his Swiss colleague, to bring the UEFA Euro 2008 to Austria and Switzerland.
