= Galicia national football team (Eastern Europe) =

Football team representing Galicia

Galicia
- Association: Polish Football Association
- Head coach: Tadeusz Synowiec (1913)
- Top scorer: Tadeusz Dąbrowski (1)
- Home stadium: Cracovia Stadium (1913)

Only international
- Galicia 1–2 Moravia and Silesia (Kraków, Austria-Hungary; 31 August 1913)

The Galicia national football team (Polish: Reprezentacja Galicji w piłce nożnej) was a football team representing Galicia, one of the crown lands of the Austria-Hungary. The team is a precursor of today's Poland national team.

It was managed by the Polish Football Association, then subordinate to the Austrian Football Association. It was not a FIFA member and therefore could not take part in official international competitions.

The only match they played on 31 August 1913, losing 2–1 against the national team of Moravia and Silesia.

== Matches ==
31 August 1913	Galicia	1–2	Moravia and Silesia	Kraków
	Dąbrowski 7'	Historia Wisły	Kitler 35'; Strack 85'	Stadium: Cracovia Stadium; Referee: Orest Dżułyński (Lviv)
