= Jacek Broniewicz =

Polish footballer

Personal information
- Full name: Jacek Broniewicz
- Date of birth: 18 September 1981 (age 45)
- Place of birth: Poland
- Height: 1.85 m (6 ft 1 in)
- Position: Defender

Team information
- Current team: Orzeł Dzierżysław
- Number: 18

Youth career
- Orzeł Dzierżysław

Senior career*
Years	Team	Apps	(Gls)
1998	Włókniarz Kietrz		
1999–2002	Włókniarz Kietrz II		
2003–2004	Włókniarz Kietrz		
2004–2006	Polonia Bytom	48	(1)
2007–2008	Polonia Warsaw	25	(0)
2008–2009	Polonia Bytom	10	(0)
2010–2012	Podbeskidzie Bielsko-Biała	29	(0)
2012–2017	Polonia Bytom	105	(19)
2016	→ ROW 1964 Rybnik (loan)	11	(0)
2016	→ Unia Racibórz (loan)		
2017–2022	Polonia Głubczyce	139	(28)
2022–	Orzeł Dzierżysław	27	(5)
- * Club domestic league appearances and goals as of 18 September 2024

Jacek Broniewicz (born 18 September 1981) is a Polish footballer who plays as a defender for Polish club Orzeł Dzierżysław.

== Career ==
On 9 December 2006, he played for Górny Śląsk in the game against the Poland national team.

== Honours ==
Polonia Bytom

- III liga Opole–Silesia: 2014–15
