= German Football Association for Moravia and Silesia =

Former football association in Austria-Hungary

- Founded: 13 July 1913; 112 years ago
- Folded: 1919
- Headquarters: Bielitz (1913–1918); Opava (1919)

The German Football Association for Moravia and Silesia (Czech: Německý fotbalový svaz pro Moravu a Slezsko, Austrian German: Deutscher Fußball-Verband für Mähren und Schlesien) was the governing body of association football of the Margraviate of Moravia and Austrian Silesia, the crown lands of the Kingdom of Bohemia. It was part of the federal Austrian Football Association and organized Moravian-Silesian Football Championship and matches of Moravia and Silesia national football team. At the end of the June 1919 it merged with the German Football Association for Bohemia to form German Football Association for Czechoslovakia.

== Presidents ==
- Rudolf Jendrzejowski (1913–1918)
- Adolf Möller (1919)

== Founding clubs ==
Association was founded by 15 clubs, including:

- Bielitz-Bialaer SV
- DFC Brünn
- DFV Rekord Troppau
- DFV Silesia Troppau
- DSC Teschen
- DSV Troppau
- DSV Witkowitz
- SpVgg Friedek

== Championship ==
Season	Champions	Ref.
1911–12	DSV Troppau	
1912–13	DSV Troppau	
1913–14	DSV Troppau	

== National team ==
Moravia and Silesia played at least one match, including the one against the team from Galicia in which they won 2–1.

31 August 1913	Galicia	1–2	Moravia and Silesia	Kraków
	Dąbrowski 7'	Historia Wisły	Kitler 35'; Strack 85'	Stadium: Cracovia Stadium; Referee: Orest Dżułyński (Lviv)
