= Burgenland Football Association =

- Formation: 1923
- Type: Football association
- Headquarters: Hotterweg 67
- Location: Eisenstadt, Austria
- President: Gerhard Milletich
- Parent organization: Austrian Football Association
- Website: bfv.at

The Burgenland Football Association (German: Burgenländischer Fussballverband, BFV) is the umbrella organization of the football clubs of the Austrian state Burgenland. The BFV was founded in 1923 and has its headquarters in Eisenstadt.

The BFV is one of 8 regional organizations of the Austrian Football Association (German: Österreichischer Fußball-Bund, ÖFB).

== History of the BFV ==
The BFV was founded 1923 un Eisenstadt. The founding members were the football clubs of Eisenstadt, Deutschkreutz, Mattersburg, Neufeld an der Leitha and Parndorf.

The first General Assembly was held on 22 March 1924 in Wiener Neustadt. 20 football clubs participated in the meeting. On 29 March 1924, the association’s first board was established with Josef Cekal as its first president.

For the first football championship in 1924 three groups were established:

- Parndorf District with 9 clubs SC Parndorf, SC Sturm Neusiedl, Garnison SC Neusiedl, SC Mönchhof, SC Halbturn, SC Frauenkirchen, SC Nickelsdorf, SC Kittsee and SC Bruckneudorf
- Eisenstadt District with 12 clubs SC Freiheit Eisenstadt, SC Hakoah Eisenstadt, SC Sonnenberg Hornstein, SC Neufeld, SC Loretto, SC Großhöflein, SC Siegendorf, SC Zillingtal-Wacker, SC Neudörfl, SV Mattersdorf, SV Wiesen and SC Sauerbrunn
- Oberwart District with 9 clubs SC Oberwart, SC Oberschützen, SC Mariasdorf, SC Bernstein, SC Rotenturm, SC Großpetersdorf, SC Pinkafeld, SC Rechnitz and SC Güssing

In Burgenland also existed a regional group of the VAFÖ (the workers union of the football clubs in Austria), starting in 1926. In 1934 the VAFÖ was disbanded and the BFV divided into North District and South District. The larger district, the North District, was disbanded on 24 May 1936. The smaller district, the South District, was disbanded in 1938 and joined the Empire Sports Association.

=== The restoration of 1945 ===
The BFV was newly founded in the fall of 1945. In October 1945, a provisional state committee was set up, at the Café Ostmark in Eisenstadt, with Otto Willomitzer as chairman.

The first office of the BFV was in Eisenstadt, in the Pfarrgasse 8. In 1960 the BFV moved into a larger building in the Haydngasse. In 1989 the BFV moved into the newly built headquarters in Hotterweg.

== BFV-Cup ==
The Burgenland Football Association also organizes a Cup competition. The BFV Cup bears currently the name Raiffeisen-Cup, named after the sponsor. The cup winner receives a fixed starting place in the 1st round of the ÖFB Cup. The BFV Cup was introduced in 1995, before this time there were Cup competitions in Burgenland in 1946–1949 and 1974–1977, which no longer take place.

=== Format ===
The BFV-Cup is held in K.O. system, were all rounds are decided in one game. In the 1st round, the lower ranked team has home field advantage. If there is a draw after 90 minutes of play, the winner will be determined immediately (without overtime) through shoot outs. The first 4 Cup rounds take place within a group (North, Central, South A, South B). Semifinals and finals within each group are held on one tournament day. The venue is either drawn or awarded on the basis of applications.

The 4 group winners then take part in the national final round. Which is held in a tournament fashion on one day, with the three groups (North, Central, South) alternating as promoters. The venue is the respective home of the group winner of each group (in the south, South A and South B alternate).

- 1st round: 64 participants (16 teams per group)
- 2ndround: 32 participants (8 first-round winners in each group)
- 3rd round: 16 participants (4 second-round winners per group); Group Semifinals
- 4th round: 8 participants (2 semi-final winners in each group); Group Finals
- 5th round: 4 participants (4 group winners); Semifinal
- 6th round: 2 participants (2 semifinal winners); Final

=== Qualification ===
Open to all clubs of the BFV, who have no chance to qualify in the current Cup season in the championship for the ÖFB Cup, meaning all teams below the Burgenland League. Therefore, the champion of the 2. Leagues are not qualified for the BFV Cup. The qualification is based on the previous seasons' championship final placement.
