= Vorarlberg Football Association =

- Formation: 4 July 1920
- Type: Football association
- Headquarters: Schloßplatz 1
- Location: Hohenems, Austria
- President: Horst Lumper
- Parent organization: Austrian Football Association
- Website: vfv.at

The Vorarlberg Football Association (German: Vorarlberger Fussballverband; VFV) is the umbrella organization of the football clubs of the Austrian state Vorarlberg. The VFV was founded in 1920 and has its headquarters in Hohenems.

The VFV is one of 8 regional organizations of the Austrian Football Association (German: Österreichischer Fußball-Bund, ÖFB).

The VFV is provider of the Fussballakademie Vorarlberg in Bregenz.
