= Lower Austrian Football Association =

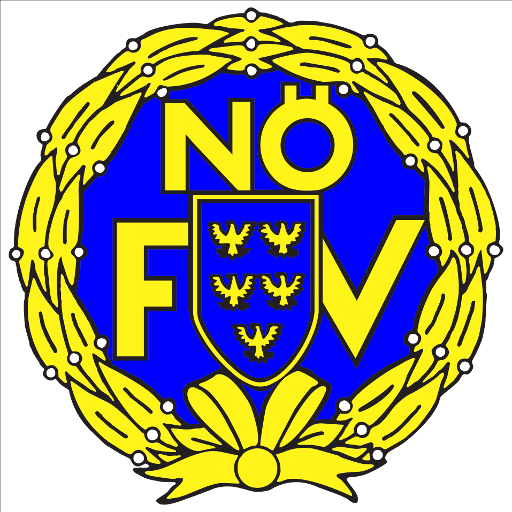
- Formation: 16 May 1911
- Type: Football association
- Headquarters: Bimbo-Binder-Promenade 1
- Location: Sankt Pölten, Austria
- President: Ludwig Binder
- Parent organization: Austrian Football Association
- Website: noefv.at

The Lower Austrian Football Association (German: Niederösterreichischer Fussballverband; NÖFV) is the umbrella organization of the football clubs of the Austrian state Lower Austria. The NÖFV was founded in 1911 and has its headquarters in Sankt Pölten.

The NÖFV is one of 8 regional organizations of the Austrian Football Association (German: Österreichischer Fußball-Bund, ÖFB).

The NÖFV is provider of the Sportschule Lindabrunn.

== See also ==
- Lower Austrian Football Cup
