= Tirol Football Association =

- Formation: 1919
- Type: Football association
- Headquarters: Stadionstraße 1a
- Location: Innsbruck, Austria
- President: Josef Geisler
- Parent organization: Austrian Football Association
- Website: tfv.at

The Tirol Football Association (German: Tiroler Fussballerband; TFV) is an umbrella organization of the football clubs of the Austrian state Tyrol, Austria. The TFV was founded in 1919 and has its headquarters in Innsbruck.

The TFV is one of 9 regional organizations of the Austrian Football Association (German: Österreichischer Fußball-Bund, ÖFB).
