= Upper Austrian Football Association =

Umbrella organization of football clubs

- Formation: 1919
- Type: Football association
- Headquarters: Daimlerstrasse 37
- Location: Linz, Austria
- President: Gerhard Götschofer
- Parent organization: Austrian Football Association
- Website: ofv.at

The Upper Austrian Football Association (German: Oberösterreichischer Fußballverband; OFV) is the umbrella organization of the football clubs of the Austrian state Upper Austria. The OFV was founded in 1919 and has its headquarters in Linz.

The StFV is one of 8 regional organizations of the Austrian Football Association (German: Österreichischer Fußball-Bund, ÖFB).
