= Styria Football Association =

- Formation: 2 July 1911
- Type: Football association
- Headquarters: Hergottwiesgasse 134
- Location: Graz, Austria
- Members: 137,904 (2015)
- President: Wolfgang Barosch
- Parent organization: Austrian Football Association
- Website: stfv.at

The Styria Football Association (German: Steirischer Fußball-Verband, StFV) is the umbrella organization of the football clubs of the Austrian state Styria. The StFV was founded in 1911 and has its headquarters in Graz.

The StFV is one of 8 regional organizations of the Austrian Football Association (German: Österreichischer Fußball-Bund, ÖFB).

In 2015, StFV had 137,904 members from 335 football clubs with 2,293 teams.

== History ==
=== The time before the establishment of the Styria Football Association ===
1893 Georg-August Wagner of Graz, brought the sport of football from Prague to Graz. He was able to quickly inspire students about this new sport. Just one year later, the first football division of the ATRV Graz was founded in Styria. The first football league game between two teams of the ATRV was played on March 18, 1894, in Graz. On October 31, 1895, a game between 1894 founded First Vienna FC and a team of Graz ATRV took place, in which Vienna took the win 5–0.

In 1900, the Graz SV was founded and in 1902 the Grazer AK (GAK). The later important Grazer Sportklub "Sturm" (Storm) – which is better known today as the SK Sturm Graz – was founded in 1909. The first significant competition in Styria, in 1907, was won by Wiener Sport-Club by a Final victory in the "Herbstmesse-Pokal" (Autumn Fair Cup) over the GAK. The Deutsch-Alpenländische Fußball-Verband (German-Alpine Football Association) was founded as one of the five sub-organizations of the Austrian Football Association. However, it was the only association that could not organize a championship for the teams of Upper Austria, Salzburg, Tyrol, Vorarlberg, the littoral, Carinthia and Styria.

=== Founding and first year ===
In May 1921 the Deutsch-Alpenländische Fußball-Verband broke up. After the Carinthian clubs left, only the Styrian teams remained and the Styrian Football Association was founded. The first records of the Styrian Championships, which were recorded as of 1921, was the Amateur Championship of Austria through the GAK in 1929, 1932 and 1933. In 1934, the SK Sturm Graz won. 1937 the professional team Chelsea F.C. from London took the win over the selected Styrian Football Association team with a score of 4–2.

1947 was the first decision to make a total Austrian Cup competition, then in 1949 the Austrian Football Bundesliga were established with an A and B league. This first championship was won by FK Austria Wien. The first Styrian participants, the SK Sturm Graz, placed 10th.

=== Success of the Styrian Clubs in Professional Football ===
In 1955 the Steiermark attained a one time record: Playing in the A League was the SK Sturm Graz, the Grazer AK, the Kapfenberger SV and ESV Austria Graz four Styrian teams. In 1959 the B League was disbanded and replaced by the Regionalliga Mitte. In 1962 the GAK managed as the first Austrian club outside Vienna to participate in the European Cup.

In 1974, the new Zehnerliga (ten-League) was introduced (as a 1st Division) and the professional 2. Division. The Donawitzer SV Alpine and GAK went to the 2nd Division and only the SK Sturm Graz remained in the 1st Division. In 1973 the relegation of SK Sturm Graz was only prevented by a special decision of the Association. In 1981 the GAK won their first major title, the ÖFB Cup. In 1998 the SK Sturm Graz became the first Styrian football club to receive the title of Austrian Football Champion, in 1999 they defended their title successfully. 2004 the GAK became the second Styrian club to win the Austrian Football Championship. In 2011, once again the Austrian Championship was awarded to a Styrian team, the SK Sturm Graz.
