= Salzburg Football Association =

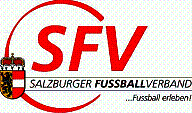
- Formation: 15 April 1921
- Type: Football association
- Headquarters: Schießstrasse 7
- Location: Salzburg, Austria
- Members: 25,000 (2015)
- President: Herbert Hübel
- Parent organization: Austrian Football Association
- Website: sfv.at

The Salzburg Football Association (German:Salzburger Fußballverband; SFV) is the umbrella organization of the football clubs of the Austrian state Salzburg. The SFV was founded in 1921 and has its headquarters in Salzburg.

The SFV is one of 8 regional organizations of the Austrian Football Association (German: Österreichischer Fußball-Bund, ÖFB).

In 2015, SFV had 25,000 members from 133 football clubs with 765 teams.
