= Austrian Football Association =

Governing body of association football in Austria

UEFA
- Founded: 18 March 1904
- Headquarters: Vienna
- FIFA affiliation: 1905
- UEFA affiliation: 15 June 1954; 72 years ago
- President: Josef Pröll
- Website: https://oefb.at

The Austrian Football Association (German: Österreichischer Fußball-Bund; ÖFB) is the governing body of football in Austria. It organises the football league, Austrian Bundesliga, the Austrian Cup and the Austria national football team, as well as its female equivalent. It is based in the capital, Vienna.

Since 1905, it has been a FIFA member, and since 1954, a UEFA member. Since 7 April 2002, Friedrich Stickler, the director of executive committee of the Austrian lottery, has been the president of the Austrian Football Association. Supporting him is its president, Kurt Ehrenberger, Frank Stronach, Gerhard Kapl, and Leo Windtner. In 2004, it was announced there are 285,000 players (both sexes) in Austria playing for 2,309 teams in the federation, although many more players play informally or for non-recognised teams. Thus the federation is the largest sporting organisation in the country. Football is, perhaps with the exception of skiing, the most popular sport in Austria. Football possesses a large value, and has a rich history and tradition in Austria.

== History ==
In 1894, the First Vienna Football Club, the first football team in Austria, were founded in Vienna. From this nucleus, the Austrian Football Association was established in 1904. One year after the establishment, Austria became a member of the international football federation FIFA and hosted the fifth FIFA congress in 1908. In 1913, they supervised the Galicja national team, which was directly subordinate to the Polish Football Association.

The milestones of the federation and past football history were the years 1930 to 1933, 1950 to 1954 and then 1958 as well as 1978, 1982, 1990 and 1998 with the participation of Austria at the World Cup.

Hugo Meisl was one of the best-known personalities in the early years of the Austrian Football Association, becoming general-secretary and national team coach in 1927. At the 1936 Summer Olympics, his team won silver after losing 2–1 to Italy, Austria's only international final. Meisl's team, nicknamed the Wunderteam, remained unbeaten from 12 April 1931 to 23 October 1932 in 14 successive matches. The highlights of this series were the 6–0 (Berlin) and 5–0 (Vienna) victories against Germany.

The 1950s saw more achievements with their well-known football greats such as Ernst Ocwirk (twice captain of the FIFA World Selection Team), Ernst Happel, Gerhard Hanappi and Walter Zeman. The FIFA World Cup 1954 ranks among being most successful in Austrian Football Association history. Twenty years after being in 4th place in the FIFA World Cup 1934 held in Italy, Austria returned to the circle of the best teams again.

== Regional associations ==
- Burgenland Football Association (German: Burgenländischer Fußball-Verband - BFV) in 1923
- Carinthia Football Association (German: Kärntner Fussballverband)
- Lower Austrian Football Association (German: Niederösterreichischer Fußball-Verband - NÖFV) in 1911
- Upper Austrian Football Association (German: Oberösterreichischer Fußball-Verband - OFV) in 1919
- Salzburg Football Association (German: Salzburger Fußball-Verband - SFV) in 1921
- Styria Football Association (German: Steirischer Fußballverband - StFV) in 1923
- Tirol Football Association (German: Tiroler Fussballverband - TFV) in 1919
- Vorarlberg Football Association (German:Vorarlberger Fussballverband - VFV) in 1920
- Vienna Football Association (German: Wiener Fußball-Verband - WFV) in 1923

=== Former regional associations ===
- Polish Football Association (Polish: Związek Polski Piłki Nożnej, ZPPN) in the Kingdom of Galicia and Lodomeria in 1911–1920 centered in Lemberg (today Lviv), transferred to the Polish Football Association centered in Warsaw as the Lwow District (okrug)
- German Alpine Football Association (German: Deutsch-Alpenländische Fußballverband) in 1911 centered in Graz
- Austrian Union of Sports Workers and Soldiers (German: Verband der Arbeiter- und Soldatensportvereine Österreichs)

== Former associations of Austria-Hungary ==
- Football Association of German Prague (German: Verband der Prager Deutschen Fußball-Vereine) in the city of Prag in 1900 to 1904 and merged to the German Football Union
- Hungarian Football Federation in 1901 as a separate Hungarian association of the Austria-Hungary
- Bohemian Football Union in 1901
- Austrian Football Union in 1904
- Polish Football Association in 1911
- German Football Association for Moravia and Silesia in 1913

== Presidents ==
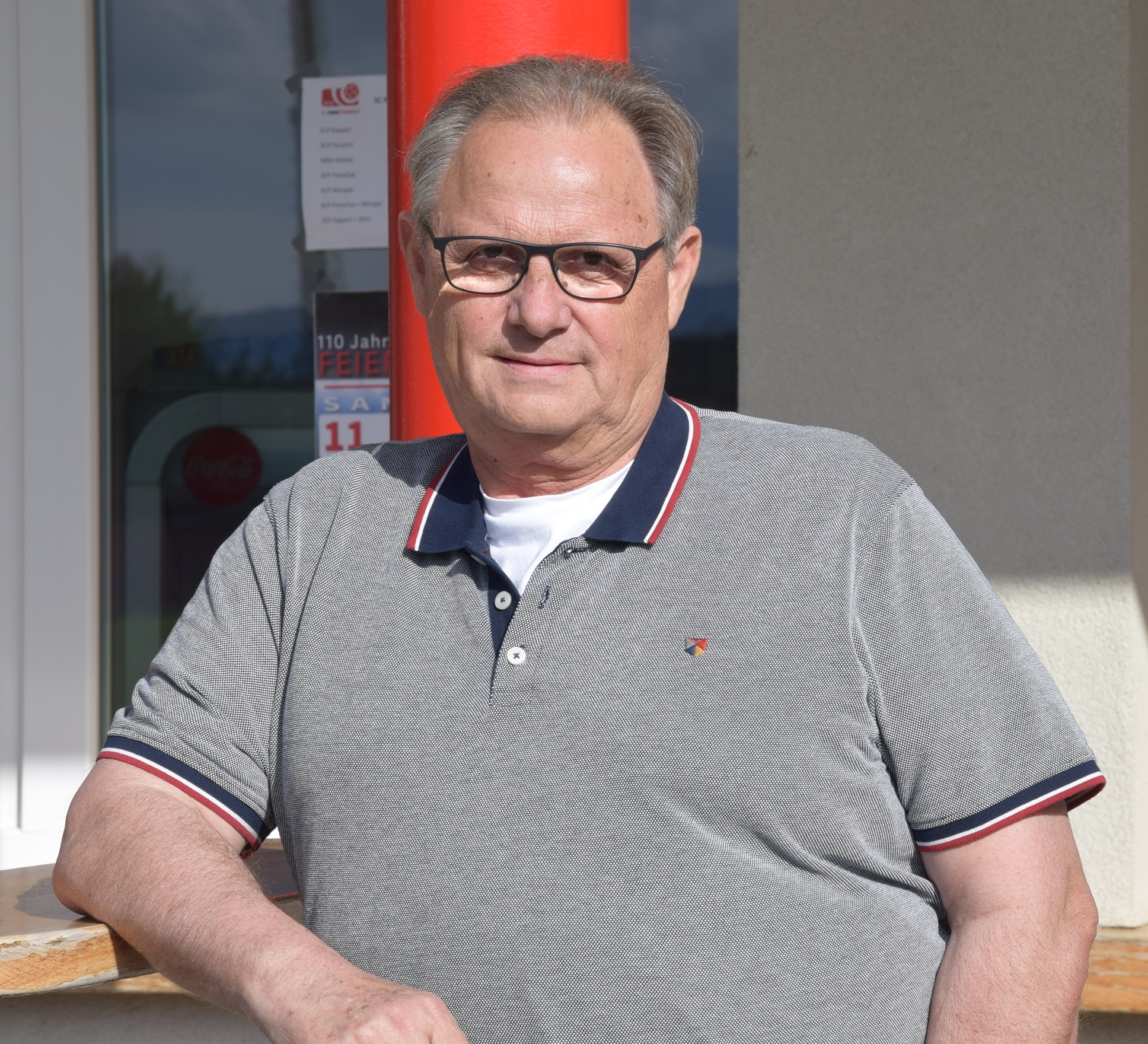
President 2021–2023: Gerhard Milletich

- 1904–1906: Heinrich Strehblow
- 1906–1907: Ignaz Abeles
- 1907–1914: Adolf Wallner
- 1914–1922: Ignaz Abeles
- 1922–1926: Karl Volkert
- 1926–1938: Richard Eberstaller
- 1945–1955: Josef Gerö
- 1955–1969: Hans Walch
- 1970–1976: Heinz Gerö
- 1976–1982: Karl Sekanina
- 1982–1984: Herbert Raggautz and Heinz Gerö (interim)
- 1984–2002: Josef "Beppo" Mauhart
- 2002–2008: Friedrich Stickler
- 2008–2009: Kurt Ehrenberger (interim)
- 2009–2021: Leo Windtner
- 2021–2023: Gerhard Milletich
- 2023–2024: Klaus Mitterdorfer
- 2024-2025: Wolfgang Bartosch (interim)
- 2025-present: Josef Pröll

== Current sponsorships ==
- Uniqa
- Admiral
- Puma
- Magenta
- Austrian Airlines
- Tipp3
- ORF
- Samsung
- Transdanubia
- Hitschler
- Wirtschaftskammer Österreich
- Kronen Zeitung
- ServusTV
- Immo United
- Hyundai
- Technogym
- Hofer
- Raiffeisen Bank International
- Observer GmbH
- Stiegl
- Intersport
- ÖBB
- Gepa Pictures
- Burgenland
- Coca-Cola
- Kelly's
- Sporteo

== Previous sponsorships ==
- Constructa-Neff
- Volkswagen
- TOTO
- Advanced Particle Filters Gmbh
- Geomix
- Adelsberger
- Orange
- McDonald's
- Nutella
- Generali
- Billa
- Siemens
- Infront Sports & Media
- Österreichische Lotterien
- Baumit
- JVC
- Martello Cafe
- Swatch
- Jacques Lemans GmbH
- Backaldrin
- Verkehrsbüro
- Reinwerfen
- Kentaro
- Mastercard
- Telekom Austria
- Altstoff Recycling Austria
- Tic Tac
