= Vienna Football Association =

- Formation: 15 February 1923
- Type: Football association
- Headquarters: Meiereistraße 7
- Location: Vienna, Austria
- Members: 28,000 (2015)
- President: Robert Sedlacek
- Parent organization: Austrian Football Association
- Website: wfv.at

The Vienna Football Association (German: Wiener Fußball-Verband; WFV) is the umbrella organization of the football clubs of the Austrian state Vienna. The WFV was founded in 1923 and has its headquarters in Vienna.

The WFV is one of 8 regional organizations of the Austrian Football Association (German: Österreichischer Fußball-Bund, ÖFB).

In 2015, WFV had 28,000 members from 269 football clubs with 998 teams.
