= 2012–13 FC Red Bull Salzburg season =

Red Bull Salzburg
2012–13 season
- Chairman: Ralf Rangnick
- Manager: Roger Schmidt
- Stadium: Red Bull Arena
- Bundesliga: 2nd
- Austrian Cup: Semi-final (vs. Pasching)
- Champions League: Second qualifying round (vs. F91 Dudelange)
- Top goalscorer: League: Jonathan Soriano (26); All: Jonathan Soriano (29)
- Highest home attendance: 16,600 vs Rapid Wien (12 August 2012)
- Lowest home attendance: 2,763 vs Pasching (7 May 2013)
- Average home league attendance: 8,147 (26 May 2013)
Home colours	Away colours	Third colours

The 2012–13 FC Red Bull Salzburg season was the 80th season in club history. Red Bull Salzburg finished the season in 2nd place, 5 points behind champions Austria Wien. In the Austrian Cup, Salzburg reached the semifinals where they were defeated by Pasching, whilst in the UEFA Champions League, Salzburg were knocked out on the Away goals rule by F91 Dudelange in the Second Qualifying Round.

== Review and events ==
On 15 June 2012, Ricardo Moniz resigned as manager of Red Bull Salzburg. Piet Hamberg was the caretaker manager while the club searched for a new head coach. The new manager is Roger Schmidt. Ralf Rangnick was hired as Sporting Director. Leonardo was released by the club after he criticized Stefan Maierhofer in an interview.

== Squad ==
As of match played 26 May 2013

No.	Name	Nationality	Position	Date of birth (age)	Signed from	Signed in	Contract ends	Apps.	Goals
Goalkeepers
1	Eddie Gustafsson	(Sweden) (Note: Eddie Gustafsson was born in Philadelphia, United States, but also qualified to represent Sweden internationally, going on to make his debut for Sweden in 2000.)	GK	31 January 1977 (aged 36)	Lyn Oslo	2009			
20	Thomas Dähne	(Germany)	GK	4 January 1994 (aged 19)	Academy	2012		1	0
33	Alexander Walke	(Germany)	GK	6 June 1983 (aged 29)	Hansa Rostock	2010			
Defenders
5	Christopher Dibon	(Austria)	DF	2 November 1990 (aged 22)	Admira Wacker	2012		7	0
6	Christian Schwegler	(Switzerland)	DF	6 June 1984 (aged 28)	Young Boys	2009			
8	Florian Klein	(Austria)	DF	17 November 1986 (aged 26)	Austria Wien	2012		25	0
15	Franz Schiemer	(Austria)	DF	21 March 1986 (aged 27)	Austria Wien	2009			
17	Andreas Ulmer	(Austria)	DF	30 October 1985 (aged 27)	SV Ried	2009			
23	Ibrahim Sekagya	(Uganda)	DF	19 December 1980 (aged 32)	Arsenal de Sarandí	2009			
25	André Ramalho	(Brazil)	DF	16 February 1992 (aged 21)	Academy	2012		0	0
29	Rodnei	(Brazil)	DF	19 December 1980 (aged 32)	1. FC Kaiserslautern	2012	2015	18	0
36	Martin Hinteregger	(Austria)	DF	7 September 1992 (aged 20)	Academy	2010			
39	Georg Teigl	(Austria)	DF	9 February 1991 (aged 22)	Academy	2009			
45	Isaac Vorsah	(Ghana)	DF	21 June 1988 (aged 24)	TSG 1899 Hoffenheim	2012	2015	18	1
Midfielders
13	Stefan Ilsanker	(Austria)	MF	18 May 1989 (aged 24)	SV Mattersburg	2012		31	0
14	Valon Berisha	(Norway) (Note: Valon Berisha was born in Malmö, Sweden to Kosovo Albanian parents. Berisha qualified to represent Norway internationally, representing them at various levels until 2016, when he switched to representing Kosovo.)	MF	7 February 1993 (aged 20)	Viking	2012		33	6
18	Dušan Švento	(Slovakia)	MF	1 August 1985 (aged 27)	Slavia Prague	2009			
22	Stefan Hierländer	(Austria)	MF	3 February 1991 (aged 22)	Austria Kärnten	2010			
24	Christoph Leitgeb	(Austria)	MF	14 April 1985 (aged 28)	Sturm Graz	2007			
37	Valentino Lazaro	(Austria)	MF	24 March 1996 (aged 17)	Academy	2012		5	0
38	Stefan Savić	(Austria)	MF	9 January 1994 (aged 19)	Academy	2010			
44	Kevin Kampl	(Slovenia) (Note: Kevin Kampl was born in Solingen, Germany, but also qualified to represent Slovenia internationally, going on to make his debut for Slovenia in 2012.)	MF	9 October 1990 (aged 22)	VfR Aalen	2012		27	4
Forwards
16	Håvard Nielsen	(Norway)	FW	15 July 1993 (aged 19)	Vålerenga	2012		28	4
26	Jonathan Soriano	(Spain)	FW	24 September 1985 (aged 27)	Barcelona B	2012		53	34
27	Alan	(Brazil)	FW	10 July 1989 (aged 23)	Fluminense	2010		57	32
31	Bright Edomwonyi	(Nigeria)	FW	24 July 1994 (aged 18)	Westerlo	2012		1	0
40	Sadio Mané	(Senegal)	FW	10 April 1992 (aged 21)	Metz	2012		29	19
Out on loan
3	Douglas da Silva	(Brazil)	DF	7 March 1984 (aged 29)	Hapoel Tel Aviv	2011		18	2
7	Jakob Jantscher	(Austria)	MF	8 January 1989 (aged 24)	Sturm Graz	2010			
10	Cristiano	(Brazil)	MF	12 January 1987 (aged 26)	Metropolitano	2012			
28	Zymer Bytyqi	(Norway) (Note: Zymer Bytyqi was born in Sint-Truiden, Belgium to Kosovo Albanian parents. Bytyqi qualified to represent Norway internationally, representing them at various levels until 2014, when he switched to representing Kosovo.)	MF	7 February 1993 (aged 20)	Sandnes Ulf	2013		0	0
34	Yusuf Otubanjo	(Nigeria)	FW	12 September 1992 (aged 20)	Atlético Madrid C	2012		1	0
43	Joaquín Boghossian	(Uruguay)	FW	19 June 1987 (aged 25)	Cerro	2010			
	Christoph Martschinko	(Austria)	DF	13 February 1994 (aged 19)	Academy	2012		0	0
	Marco Meilinger	(Austria)	MF	8 August 1991 (aged 21)	Academy	2011			
	Daniel Offenbacher	(Austria)	MF	18 February 1992 (aged 21)	Academy	2010			
	Alexander Aschauer	(Austria)	FW	14 March 1992 (aged 21)	Academy	2009			
Left during the season
4	David Mendes da Silva	(Netherlands)	MF	4 August 1982 (aged 30)	AZ Alkmaar	2010			
9	Stefan Maierhofer	(Austria)	FW	16 August 1982 (aged 30)	Wolverhampton Wanderers	2011			
11	Gonzalo Zárate	(Argentina)	FW	6 August 1984 (aged 28)	Grasshoppers	2010			
21	Rasmus Lindgren	(Sweden)	MF	29 November 1984 (aged 28)	AFC Ajax	2011			
36	Leonardo	(Brazil)	MF	9 March 1983 (aged 30)	NAC Breda	2012			

=== Out on loan ===
Note: Flags indicate national team as defined under FIFA eligibility rules; some limited exceptions apply. Players may hold more than one non-FIFA nationality.

No.	Pos.	Nation	Player
3	DF	BRA	Douglas da Silva (at Figueirense)
7	MF	AUT	Jakob Jantscher (at Dynamo Moscow)
10	MF	BRA	Cristiano (at Tochigi)
34	FW	NGR	Yusuf Otubanjo (at Pasching)
43	FW	URU	Joaquín Boghossian (at Cercle Brugge)

No.	Pos.	Nation	Player
—	DF	AUT	Christoph Martschinko (at Wiener Neustadt)
—	MF	AUT	Marco Meilinger (at SV Ried)
—	MF	AUT	Daniel Offenbacher (at Wiener Neustadt)
—	MF	NOR	Zymer Bytyqi (at Sandnes Ulf)
—	FW	AUT	Alexander Aschauer (at Wacker Burghausen)

=== Left during the season ===
Note: Flags indicate national team as defined under FIFA eligibility rules; some limited exceptions apply. Players may hold more than one non-FIFA nationality.

No.	Pos.	Nation	Player
4	MF	NED	David Mendes da Silva
9	FW	AUT	Stefan Maierhofer
11	FW	ARG	Gonzalo Zárate (to Young Boys)

No.	Pos.	Nation	Player
21	MF	SWE	Rasmus Lindgren
36	MF	BRA	Leonardo

== Transfers ==
=== In ===
Date	Position	Nationality	Name	From	Fee	Ref.
1 July 2012	DF	(Austria)	Christopher Dibon	Admira Wacker		
1 July 2012	DF	(Austria)	Florian Klein	Austria Wien		
1 July 2012	MF	(Austria)	Stefan Ilsanker	SV Mattersburg		
1 July 2012	MF	(Brazil)	Leonardo	NAC Breda		
26 July 2012	MF	(Norway)	Valon Berisha	Viking	Undisclosed	
26 July 2012	FW	(Norway)	Håvard Nielsen	Vålerenga	Undisclosed	
23 August 2012†	MF	(Norway)	Zymer Bytyqi	Sandnes Ulf	Undisclosed	
28 August 2012	FW	(Nigeria)	Bright Edomwonyi	Westerlo	Undisclosed	
31 August 2012	DF	(Brazil)	Rodnei	1. FC Kaiserslautern	Undisclosed	
31 August 2012	DF	(Ghana)	Isaac Vorsah	TSG 1899 Hoffenheim	Undisclosed	
31 August 2012	MF	(Slovenia)	Kevin Kampl	VfR Aalen	Undisclosed	
31 August 2012	FW	(Senegal)	Sadio Mané	Metz	Undisclosed	
23 November 2012	FW	(Nigeria)	Yusuf Otubanjo	Atlético Madrid C		

† Transfers announced on the above date, being finalised on 1 January 2013.

=== Out ===
Date	Position	Nationality	Name	To	Fee	Ref.
30 August 2012	FW	(Argentina)	Gonzalo Zárate	Young Boys	Undisclosed	

=== Loans out ===
Start date	Position	Nationality	Name	To	End date	Ref.
31 August 2011	MF	(Austria)	Marco Meilinger	SV Ried		
1 July 2012	FW	(Austria)	Alexander Aschauer	Wacker Burghausen		
1 July 2012	MF	(Austria)	Daniel Offenbacher	Wiener Neustadt		
30 August 2012	DF	(Austria)	Christoph Martschinko	Wiener Neustadt	30 January 2014	
6 September 2012	MF	(Austria)	Jakob Jantscher	Dynamo Moscow	End of Season	
1 January 2013	MF	(Brazil)	Cristiano	Tochigi	7 January 2014	
3 January 2013	DF	(Brazil)	Douglas da Silva	Figueirense	31 December 2013	
21 January 2013	FW	(Nigeria)	Yusuf Otubanjo	Pasching	30 Jun3 2014	
25 January 2013	FW	(Uruguay)	Joaquín Boghossian	Cercle Brugge		
9 March 2013	MF	(Norway)	Zymer Bytyqi	Sandnes Ulf	31 December 2014	

=== Released ===
Date	Position	Nationality	Name	Joined	Date
26 September 2012	MF	(Sweden)	Rasmus Lindgren	Groningen	30 November 2012
30 October 2012	MF	(Brazil)	Leonardo	Ferencvárosi	17 July 2014
9 January 2013	FW	(Austria)	Stefan Maierhofer	1. FC Köln	1 January 2013
14 February 2013	MF	(Netherlands)	David Mendes da Silva	Panathinaikos	4 July 2013
31 May 2013	DF	(Uganda)	Ibrahim Sekagya	New York Red Bulls	11 July 2013
30 June 2013	MF	(Austria)	Daniel Offenbacher	Sturm Graz	1 July 2013
30 June 2013	MF	(Austria)	Stefan Savić	Liefering	1 January 2014
30 June 2013	FW	(Austria)	Alexander Aschauer	First Vienna	2 September 2013

== Friendlies ==
23 June 2012	Union Mondsee	0–3	Red Bull Salzburg	Mondsee
18:00 CEST (UTC+2)			Cristiano; Maierhofer; Savić	Stadium: Sportplatz

27 June 2012	Red Bull Salzburg	3–1	SV Grödig	Leogang
18:00 CEST (UTC+2)	Soriano; Douglas; Cristiano		Öbster	Stadium: Sportplatz

30 June 2012	Red Bull Salzburg	0–0	Wacker Burghausen	Wals-Siezenheim
16:00 CEST (UTC+2)				Stadium: Red Bull Akademie

4 July 2012	Red Bull Salzburg	3–2	Steaua București	Straßwalchen
18:00 CEST (UTC+2)	Maierhofer; Švento; Savić		Filip; Tenase (pen.)	Stadium: Sportplatz; Attendance: 1,400

5 July 2012	Red Bull Salzburg	1–0	Terek Grozny	Wals-Siezenheim
18:00 CEST (UTC+2)	Maierhofer			Stadium: Red Bull Akademie

8 July 2012	Red Bull Salzburg	2–0	Anderlecht	Wals-Siezenheim
17:30 CEST (UTC+2)	Maierhofer 22'; Savić 81'			Stadium: Red Bull Arena; Attendance: 3,500

9 July 2012	Red Bull Salzburg	4–1	Viktoria Plzeň	Wals-Siezenheim
CEST (UTC+2)	Soriano (pen.); Hierländer; Cristiano; Douglas		Wágner	Stadium: Red Bull Akademie; Attendance: 400

7 August 2012	Red Bull Salzburg	1–4	Eintracht Frankfurt	Linz
CEST (UTC+2)	Maierhofer 60'		Meier 30', 35', 42'; Matmour 58'	Stadium: Stadion der Stadt

21 August 2012	Red Bull Salzburg	1–0	Ingolstadt 04	Aschheim
CEST (UTC+2)	Soriano 43' (pen.)			Stadium: Sportpark Aschheim; Attendance: Dr. Felix Byrch

6 September 2012	Red Bull Salzburg	0–0	SSV Jahn Regensburg
CEST (UTC+2)				Attendance: 200

9 October 2012	Red Bull Salzburg	4–2	Pasching	Wals-Siezenheim
CEST (UTC+2)	Teigl 36', 83'; Maierhofer 68'; Dibon 89'		Casanova 11'; I.Kovacec 53'	Stadium: Nachwuchsakademie Liefering

13 November 2012	Red Bull Salzburg	7–1	SV Kuchl	Wals-Siezenheim
CET (UTC+1)	Boghossian 23', 55', 66', 87'; Edomwonyi 42'; Otubanjo 75', 79'		Gastgeber 22'	Stadium: Nachwuchsakademie Liefering

19 January 2013	Red Bull Salzburg	3–1	SpVgg Unterhaching	Wals-Siezenheim
17:00 CET (UTC+1)	Leitgeb 28'; Mané 80'; Alan 82'	Report	Schweinsteiger 77'	Stadium: Nachwuchsakademie Liefering; Referee: Bernd Hirschbichler

25 January 2013	1. FC Kaiserslautern	0–1	Red Bull Salzburg	Belek, Turkey
16:30 CET (UTC+1)		Report	Schiemer 56'

26 January 2013	Red Bull Salzburg	3–1	Berliner AK 07	Belek, Turkey
14:30 CET (UTC+1)	Dibon 2'; Alan 31', 45'		Goal
Note: The match ended after the 56th minute due to heavy thunderstorm.

30 January 2013	Red Bull Salzburg	1–2	Hajduk Split	Belek, Turkey
14:00 CET (UTC+1)	Soriano 14'	Report	Vuković 8'; Stojanović 80'

6 February 2013	Red Bull Salzburg	4–0	Dynamo České Budějovice	Wals-Siezenheim
15:00 CET (UTC+1)	Lazaro 31'; Alan 31' (pen.); Soriano 49' (pen.), 56'	Report		Stadium: Nachwuchsakademie Liefering

9 February 2013	Red Bull Salzburg	2–1	ViOn Zlaté Moravce	Wals-Siezenheim
15:00 CET (UTC+1)	Soriano 85'; Schiemer 90'	Report	Hodek 40'	Stadium: Nachwuchsakademie Liefering

16 February 2013	Red Bull Salzburg	2–2	SV Grödig	Wals-Siezenheim
11:00 CET (UTC+1)	Schiemer 59'; Soriano 70' (pen.)		Öbster 34' (pen.); Lexa 51'	Stadium: Nachwuchsakademie Liefering

16 February 2013	Red Bull Salzburg	3–2	SV Horn	Wals-Siezenheim
15:00 CET (UTC+1)	Kampl 11'; Alan 54'; Lazaro 72'		P.Zulechner (38.); Cleiton 88'	Stadium: Red Bull Akademie

21 March 2013	Red Bull Salzburg	4–0	SCR Altach	Wals-Siezenheim
15:00 CET (UTC+1)	Soriano 6'; Alan 74'; Dibon 81'; Ulmer 84'			Stadium: Red Bull Arena

== Competitions ==
=== Overview ===
Competition	First match	Last match	Starting round	Final position	Record							
Competition	First match	Last match	Starting round	Final position	Pld	W	D	L	GF	GA	GD	Win %
Bundesliga	21 July 2012	26 May 2013	Matchday 1	2nd	36	22	11	3	91	39	+52	61.11
Austrian Cup	13 July 2012	7 May 2013	First round	Semifinal	5	4	0	1	12	4	+8	80.00
Champions League	17 July 2012	24 July 2013	Second Qualifying round	Second Qualifying round	2	0	1	1	4	4	+0	0.00
Total					43	26	12	5	107	47	+60	60.47

Last updated: 26 May 2013
Source: Soccerway

=== Bundesliga ===
==== League table ====
Pos	Team	Pld	W	D	L	GF	GA	GD	Pts	Qualification or relegation
1	Austria Wien (C)	36	25	7	4	84	31	+53	82	Qualification for the Champions League third qualifying round
2	Red Bull Salzburg	36	22	11	3	91	39	+52	77	Qualification for the Champions League third qualifying round
3	Rapid Wien	36	16	9	11	57	39	+18	57	Qualification for the Europa League third qualifying round
4	Sturm Graz	36	13	9	14	49	56	−7	48	Qualification for the Europa League second qualifying round
5	Wolfsberger AC	36	12	11	13	53	56	−3	47	

Source: weltfussball.de (in German)
Rules for classification: 1) points; 2) goal difference; 3) number of goals scored.
(C) Champions

==== Results summary ====
Overall								Home						Away					
Pld	W	D	L	GF	GA	GD	Pts	W	D	L	GF	GA	GD	W	D	L	GF	GA	GD
36	22	11	3	91	39	+52	77	12	5	1	51	19	+32	10	6	2	40	20	+20

==== Results by round ====
Round	1	2	3	4	5	6	7	8	9	10	11	12	13	14	15	16	17	18	19	20	21	22	23	24	25	26	27	28	29	30	31	32	33	34	35	36
Ground	A	H	A	H	A	H	A	H	A	H	A	H	A	H	A	H	A	H	A	H	H	H	A	A	A	H	A	H	A	H	A	H	A	H	A	H
Result	W	W	W	L	D	D	W	D	W	W	W	W	L	W	W	W	L	D	D	W	D	W	D	W	D	D	D	W	W	W	W	W	W	W	D	W

Updated to match(es) played on 26 May 2013. Source: See Results
A = Away; H = Home; W = Win; D = Draw; L = Loss

==== Results ====
21 July 2012 1	Sturm Graz	0–2	Red Bull Salzburg	Graz
16:00 CEST (UTC+2)	Säumel (yellow card) 31'; Weber (yellow card) 68'; Kröpfl (yellow card) 75'	Report	Ilsanker (yellow card) 7' (yellow-red card) 56'; Soriano 11', 22'; Schiemer (yellow card) 18'; Ulmer (yellow card) 90'	Stadium: UPC-Arena; Attendance: 13,085; Referee: Oliver Drachta

28 July 2012 2	Red Bull Salzburg	3–2	SV Mattersburg	Wals-Siezenheim
18:30 CEST (UTC+2)	Schiemer 14'; Soriano 33'; Jantscher (yellow card) 44'; Zárate 77'	Report	Malić (yellow card) 13'; Bürger 45+1' (yellow card) 82'; Höller 49' (yellow card) 63'	Stadium: Red Bull Arena; Attendance: 4,600; Referee: Gerhard Grobelnik

4 August 2012 3	Wolfsberger AC	0–2	Red Bull Salzburg	Wolfsberg
18:30 CEST (UTC+2)	Polverino (yellow card) 49'; Jovanović (yellow card) 53' de Paula (yellow card) 75'	Report	Soriano 14', 85'; Hinteregger (yellow card) 45+2'; Jantscher (yellow card) 45+2'	Stadium: Lavanttal-Arena; Attendance: 6,650; Referee: Manuel Schüttengruber

12 August 2012 4	Red Bull Salzburg	0–2	Rapid Wien	Wals-Siezenheim
16:00 CEST (UTC+2)	Schwegler (yellow card) 51'	Report	Boyd (yellow card) 8'; Alar 26'; Schimpelsberger (yellow card) 67'; Grozurek 76'; Kulovits (yellow card) 81'; Trimmel (yellow card) 88'	Stadium: Red Bull Arena; Attendance: 16,600; Referee: René Eisner

18 August 2012 5	Admira Wacker	4–4	Red Bull Salzburg	Mödling
18:30 CEST (UTC+2)	Hosiner 15', 45'; Sabitzer (yellow card) 35' (goal) 37'; Plassnegger (yellow card) 51'; Schicker 80'; Windbichler (yellow card) 90+1'; Schwab (yellow card) 90+5'	Report	Nielsen 45+2', 46', 56'; Hierländer (yellow card) 61'; Maierhofer 77'; Walke (yellow card) 90+1'; Mendes da Silva (yellow card) 90+2'	Stadium: Trenkwalder Arena; Attendance: 3,212; Referee: Alexander Harkam

25 August 2012 6	Red Bull Salzburg	1–1	Wiener Neustadt	Wals-Siezenheim
18:30 CEST (UTC+2)	Berisha 34'; Zárate (red card) 90'	Report	Hlinka 33'; Lenko (yellow card) 37'; Offenbacher (yellow card) 62'; Fröschl (red card) 90'	Stadium: Red Bull Arena; Attendance: 5,600; Referee: Dieter Muckenhammer

1 September 2012 7	Wacker Innsbruck	0–4	Red Bull Salzburg	Innsbruck
18:30 CEST (UTC+2)	Wernitznig (yellow card) 13'; Wallner (yellow card) 63'; Kofler (yellow card) 68'; Đaković (yellow card) 85'	Report	Jantscher 12'; Berisha 31'; Schiemer 38' (yellow card) 49'; Soriano 70'	Stadium: Tivoli-Neu; Attendance: 5,800; Referee: Robert Schörgenhofer

15 September 2012 8	Red Bull Salzburg	1–1	SV Ried	Wals-Siezenheim
18:30 CEST (UTC+2)	Vorsah (red card) 5'; Kampl (yellow card) 30'; Soriano 34'	Report	Hadžić (yellow card) 8'; Ziegl 70'; Schicker (yellow card) 76'	Stadium: Red Bull Arena; Attendance: 8,500; Referee: Gerhard Grobelnik

22 September 2012 9	Austria Wien	0–1	Red Bull Salzburg	Vienna
18:30 CEST (UTC+2)	Holland (yellow card) 26'; Gorgon (yellow card) 88'	Report	Mané (yellow card) 31'; Kampl (yellow card) 69'; Hinteregger (yellow card) 71'; Berisha 86'	Stadium: Generali Arena; Attendance: 11,800; Referee: Markus Hameter

30 September 2012 10	Red Bull Salzburg	3–2	Sturm Graz	Wals-Siezenheim
16:00 CEST (UTC+2)	Hinteregger (yellow card) 33'; Berisha 43'; Mane 45', 89'; Kampl (yellow card) 64'	Report	Hölzl (yellow card) 30'; Okotie 35' (yellow card) 75'; Sukuta-Pasu (yellow card) 42'; F.Kainz 65'; Klem (yellow card) 88'; T.Kainz (yellow card) 90+3'	Stadium: Red Bull Arena; Attendance: 10,950; Referee: Manuel Schüttengruber

6 October 2012 11	SV Mattersburg	1–3	Red Bull Salzburg	Mattersburg
18:30 CEST (UTC+2)	Mravac (yellow card) 52'; Höller 56'; Seidl (yellow card) 59'	Report	Soriano 5' (pen.), 52' (pen.); Vorsah 60'; Schiemer (yellow card) 73'; Hinteregger (yellow card) 76'	Stadium: Pappelstadion; Attendance: 3,900; Referee: René Eisner

20 October 2012 12	Red Bull Salzburg	4–1	Wolfsberger AC	Wals-Siezenheim
16:00 CEST (UTC+2)	Mane 8'; Leitgeb 36'; Schiemer (yellow card) 38'; Thonhofer 54' (o.g.); Teigl 88'	Report	Kerhe (yellow card) 53'; Falk 66'; Polverino (yellow card) 68'	Stadium: Red Bull Arena; Attendance: 9,400; Referee: Oliver Drachta

28 October 2012 13	Rapid Wien	2–0	Red Bull Salzburg	Wien
16:00 CET (UTC+1)	Hofmann 14'; Boyd 47' (yellow card) 68'; Schimpelsberger (yellow card) 87'	Report	Klein (yellow card) 45+1'; Mané (yellow card) 50'; Hinteregger (yellow card) 86'	Stadium: Gerhard Hanappi Stadium; Attendance: 16,000; Referee: Alexander Harkam

3 November 2012 14	Red Bull Salzburg	5–0	Admira Wacker	Wals-Siezenheim
16:00 CET (UTC+1)	Leitgeb 21', 89'; Soriano 27', 74'; Windbichler 86' (o.g.); Lazaro (yellow card) 88'	Report	Windbichler (yellow card) 15'; Plassnegger (yellow card) 24'; Schick (yellow card) 52'	Stadium: Red Bull Arena; Attendance: 6,950; Referee: Sascha Amhof

11 November 2012 15	Wiener Neustadt	0–3	Red Bull Salzburg	Wiener Neustadt
16:00 CET (UTC+1)	Lenko (yellow card) 83'	Report	Schiemer 7'; Soriano 53', 81'; Kampl (yellow card) 88'	Stadium: Stadion Wiener Neustadt; Attendance: 1,800; Referee: Dieter Muckenhammer

18 November 2012 16	Red Bull Salzburg	2–0	Wacker Innsbruck	Wals-Siezenheim
16:00 CET (UTC+1)	Mané 19' (yellow card) 19'; Ilsanker (yellow card) 32'; Hinteregger (yellow card) 63'; Teigl 83'	Report	Merino (yellow card) 18'; Schilling (yellow card) 44'; Wallner (red card) 53'; Abrahám (yellow card) 76'; Wernitznig (yellow card) 87'	Stadium: Red Bull Arena; Attendance: 8,350; Referee: Markus Hameter

24 November 2012 17	SV Ried	3–1	Red Bull Salzburg	Ried im Innkreis
18:30 CET (UTC+1)	Walch 32' (yellow card) 70'; Hammerer 73' (yellow card) 78'; Rodríguez (yellow card) 88'; Hadzic 90+2' (pen.)	Report	Teigl 5'; Ilsanker (yellow card) 42'; Schiemer (yellow card) 79'; Leitgeb (yellow card) 90'	Stadium: Keine Sorgen Arena; Attendance: 5,900; Referee: Gerhard Grobelnik

2 December 2012 18	Red Bull Salzburg	0–0	Austria Wien	Wals-Siezenheim
16:00 CET (UTC+1)	Mané (yellow card) 15'; Ulmer (yellow card) 47'; Dibon (yellow card) 85'	Report	Stanković (yellow card) 4'; Ortlechner (yellow card) 21'; Suttner (yellow card) 22'; Šimkovič (yellow card) 82'	Stadium: Red Bull Arena; Attendance: 16,057; Referee: Robert Schörgenhofer

8 December 2012 19	Sturm Graz	1–1	Red Bull Salzburg	Graz
18:30 CET (UTC+1)	Sukuta-Pasu 8'; Ehrenreich (yellow card) 78'	Report	Vorsah (yellow card) 22'; Lazaro (yellow card) 43'; Mané 66'	Stadium: UPC-Arena; Attendance: 10,041; Referee: Manfred Krassnitzer

15 December 2012 20	Red Bull Salzburg	7–0	SV Mattersburg	Wals-Siezenheim
18:30 CET (UTC+1)	Mané 15', 60', 90+1'; Teigl 24'; Ilsanker (yellow card) 52'; Berisha 58'; Hierländer 68'; Soriano 70' (pen.)	Report	Röcher (yellow card) 26'; Pöllhuber (red card) 71'; Rodler (yellow card) 71'; Höller (yellow card) 77'	Stadium: Red Bull Arena; Attendance: 3,820; Referee: Harald Lechner

24 February 2013 22	Red Bull Salzburg	3–3	Rapid Wien	Wals-Siezenheim
16:00 CET (UTC+1)	Kampl 1' (yellow card) 12'; Soriano 69' (pen.); Hinteregger 86'	Report	T.Schrammel (yellow card) 4' (red card) 68'; Boyd 48' (yellow card) 90'; Pichler (yellow card) 76'; G.Burgstaller 82'; Gerson (yellow card) 86'; Sabitzer 90+1'; S.Hofmann (yellow card) 90+4'	Stadium: Red Bull Arena; Attendance: 11,210; Referee: Markus Hameter

2 March 2013 24	Red Bull Salzburg	3–1	Wiener Neustadt	Wals-Siezenheim
18:30 CET (UTC+1)	Soriano 44', 49'; Schiemer (yellow card) 50'; Alan 54'	Report	Terzić 19'; Fröschl (yellow card) 22'; Mimm (yellow card) 39'; Rauter (yellow card) 39'; Bozkurt (yellow card) 74'; Hofbauer (yellow card) 78'	Stadium: Red Bull Arena; Attendance: 4,800; Referee: Harald Lechner

6 March 2013 21	Wolfsberger AC	1–1	Red Bull Salzburg	Wolfsberg
18:30 CET (UTC+1)	Rivera 27' (yellow card) 34'; Thonhofer (yellow card) 37'; Hüttenbrenner (yellow card) 88'; Kröpfl (yellow card) 88'	Report	Ilsanker (yellow card) 38'; Schiemer 72'	Stadium: Lavanttal-Arena; Attendance: 4,100; Referee: Alexander Harkam

10 March 2013 25	Wacker Innsbruck	2–3	Red Bull Salzburg	Innsbruck
16:00 CET (UTC+1)	Wallner 3' (yellow card) 66'; Schütz 40'; Siller (yellow card) 72'	Report	Schiemer (yellow card) 15'; Vorsah (yellow card) 27'; Teigl 66'; Soriano 74' (pen.); Hinteregger (yellow card) 76'; Mané 90+5'	Stadium: Tivoli-Neu; Attendance: 5,200; Referee: Dominik Ouschan

13 March 2013 23	Admira Wacker	1–1	Red Bull Salzburg	Mödling
18:30 CET (UTC+1)	Seebacher (yellow card) 13' (yellow-red card) 79'; Malagón 44'; Schachner (yellow card) 69'	Report	Ilsanker (yellow card) 14'; Leitgeb 16'; Schiemer (yellow card) 45'; Ulmer (yellow card) 67'; Vorsah (yellow card) 76'; Klein (yellow card) 88'	Stadium: Trenkwalder Arena; Attendance: 2,150; Referee: Christian Dintar

16 March 2013 26	Red Bull Salzburg	2–2	SV Ried	Wals-Siezenheim
18:30 CET (UTC+1)	Soriano 42'; Mané (yellow card) 75'; Hinteregger 81'	Report	Vastić (yellow card) 15'; R.Žulj (yellow card) 20'; Meilinger 22', 52'; Gebauer (yellow card) 85'; Hammerer (yellow card) 90+1'	Stadium: Red Bull Arena; Attendance: 5,870; Referee: Manfred Krassnitzer

31 March 2013 27	Austria Wien	1–1	Red Bull Salzburg	Vienna
16:00 CEST (UTC+2)	A.Grünwald (yellow card) 24' (goal) 37' (pen.); Mader (yellow card) 65'; Stanković (yellow card) 86'; Gorgon (yellow card) 90+2'	Report	Vorsah (red card) 37'; Rodnei (yellow card) 48'; Kampl 61'	Stadium: Generali Arena; Attendance: 12,180; Referee: Robert Schörgenhofer

7 April 2013 28	Red Bull Salzburg	3–0	Sturm Graz	Wals-Siezenheim
16:00 CEST (UTC+2)	Ilsanker (yellow card) 19'; Kampl (yellow card) 39'; Soriano 51', 77'; Rodnei (yellow card) 56'; Mané 80'	Report	Säumel (yellow card) 41'; F.Kainz (yellow card) 50'	Stadium: Red Bull Arena; Attendance: 7,690; Referee: Harald Lechner

13 April 2013 29	SV Mattersburg	1–2	Red Bull Salzburg	Mattersburg
18:30 CEST (UTC+2)	Röcher (yellow card) 27'; Höller 51'; Naumoski (yellow card) 82'	Report	Schiemer (yellow card) 39'; Berisha (yellow card) 39'; Teigl (yellow card) 63'; Mané 72' (yellow card) 74' (yellow-red card) 80'; Soriano 75'	Stadium: Pappelstadion; Attendance: 3,400; Referee: Gerhard Grobelnik

20 April 2013 30	Red Bull Salzburg	6–2	Wolfsberger AC	Wals-Siezenheim
18:30 CEST (UTC+2)	Alan 17', 33' (pen.), 58'; Soriano 50', 76', 87'; Schwegler (yellow card) 54'	Report	de Paula 10'; Liendl (yellow card) 31'; Hüttenbrenner (red card) 32'; Putsche 37'; Polverino (yellow card) 42'; Rivera (yellow card) 85'	Stadium: Red Bull Arena; Attendance: 5,870; Referee: Manuel Schüttengruber

27 April 2013 31	Rapid Wien	1–3	Red Bull Salzburg	Wien
18:30 CEST (UTC+2)	Alar 63'; Katzer (yellow card) 65'; Pichler (yellow card) 78'; Bošković (yellow card) 79'	Report	Alan 65', 70' (pen.) (yellow card) 70'; Vorsah (yellow card) 74'; Rodnei (yellow card) 77'; Mané (yellow card) 88'; Švento 90'	Stadium: Gerhard Hanappi Stadium; Attendance: 15,100; Referee: Oliver Drachta

4 May 2013 32	Red Bull Salzburg	2–1	Admira Wacker	Wals-Siezenheim
18:30 CEST (UTC+2)	Sekagya (yellow card) 50'; Alan 63'; Rodnei (yellow card) 67'; Mané 74'	Report	Windbichler (yellow card) 18'; Schösswendter (yellow card) 28'; Seeger (yellow card) 38'; Toth 51' (yellow card) 53'; Thürauer (yellow card) 66'; Drescher (yellow card) 82'; Gremsl (yellow card) 89'	Stadium: Red Bull Arena; Attendance: 6,724; Referee: Manfred Krassnitzer

12 May 2013 33	Wiener Neustadt	0–6	Red Bull Salzburg	Wiener Neustadt
16:00 CEST (UTC+2)	Mimm (yellow card) 24'; Martschinko (yellow card) 32'; Fröschl (yellow card) 40'; Siebenhandl (yellow card) 44'; Ramsebner (yellow card) 73'	Report	Soriano 5'; Alan 16', 78'; Švento (yellow card) 51'; Kampl 63'; Berisha 66'; Martschinko 71' (o.g.)	Stadium: Stadion Wiener Neustadt; Attendance: 2,300; Referee: Alexander Harkam

18 May 2013 34	Red Bull Salzburg	3–1	Wacker Innsbruck	Wals-Siezenheim
18:30 CEST (UTC+2)	Kampl (yellow card) 29' (goal) 48'; Schwegler (yellow card) 37'; Soriano (yellow card) 41'; Alan 68'; Mané 79'	Report	Wallner 39'; Bergmann (yellow card) 40'; Hauser (yellow card) 51'; Kofler (yellow card) 53'; Siller (yellow card) 74'	Stadium: Red Bull Arena; Attendance: 7,520; Referee: Sascha Kever

22 May 2013 35	SV Ried	2–2	Red Bull Salzburg	Ried im Innkreis
20:30 CEST (UTC+2)	Reifeltshammer 36'; R.Žulj 54'; Ziegl (yellow card) 73'	Report	Alan 25'; Mané 30'; Rodnei (yellow card) 54'	Stadium: Keine Sorgen Arena; Attendance: 4,500; Referee: Christian Dintar

26 May 2013 36	Red Bull Salzburg	3–0	Austria Wien	Wals-Siezenheim
16:00 CEST (UTC+2)	Alan (yellow card) 7'; Mané 39', 75'; Sekagya 83'	Report	Kienast (yellow card) 30'; Dilaver (yellow card) 49'; Holland (yellow card) 59'; Šimkovič (yellow card) 64'; Suttner (yellow card) 64'; Rogulj (yellow card) 72'; Ortlechner (yellow card) 85'	Stadium: Red Bull Arena; Attendance: 13,075; Referee: Manfred Krassnitzer

=== Austrian Cup ===
13 July 2012 First Round	Wiener Sport-Club	0–2	Red Bull Salzburg	Vienna
20:30 CEST (UTC+2)	Y.Soura (yellow card) 7'; M.Berkovic (yellow card) 17'	Report	Sekagya 31'; Mendes da Silva (yellow card) 55'; Cristiano 70'	Stadium: Sportklub Stadium; Attendance: 4,700; Referee: Markus Hameter Mag

25 September 2012 Second Round	Stegersbach	1–3	Red Bull Salzburg	Stegersbach
18:00 CEST (UTC+2)	D.Siegl (yellow card) 17' (goal) 60'; C.Weidinger (yellow card) 70'; D.Wendel (yellow card) 75'	Report	Teigl 49'; Soriano 56'; Maierhofer 85'	Stadium: Stadion Stegersbach; Attendance: 1,800; Referee: Harald Lechner

31 October 2012 Third Round	Kalsdorf	1–3	Red Bull Salzburg	Kalsdorf bei Graz
19:00 CET (UTC+1)	M.Heil (yellow card) 36'; M.Grundler 43'; D.Hofer (yellow card) 48'; Trdina (yellow card) 67'; R.Dorn (yellow card) 87' (yellow-red card) 90'; C.Weber (yellow card) 90+4'	Report	Kampl (yellow card) 28'; Mané 37', 81', 90+3' (yellow card) 90'; Schiemer (yellow card) 57'	Stadium: Sportzentrum Kalsdorf; Attendance: 2,100; Referee: Markus Hameter

16 April 2013 Quarterfinal	Wacker Innsbruck	0–3	Red Bull Salzburg	Innsbruck
20:30 CEST (UTC+2)	Wernitznig (yellow card) 46'	Report	Soriano 44', 89'; Švejnoha 53' (o.g.)	Stadium: Tivoli-Neu; Attendance: 1,512; Referee: Alexander Harkam

7 May 2013 Semifinal	Red Bull Salzburg	1–2	Pasching	Wals-Siezenheim
20:30 CEST (UTC+2)	Kampl (yellow card) 41'; Nielsen 48'	Report	Kerschbaumer (yellow card) 13' (goal) 79'; Kovacec 69'; Hamdemir (yellow card) 90+2'	Stadium: Red Bull Arena; Attendance: 2,763; Referee: Gerhard Grobelnik

=== UEFA Champions League ===
==== Qualifying rounds ====
17 July 2012 Second Qualifying round 1st leg	F91 Dudelange (Luxembourg)	1–0	(Austria) Red Bull Salzburg	Dudelange, Luxembourg
18:30 CEST (UTC+2)	Mélisse (yellow card) 39'; Joachim 75'; Payal (yellow card) 81'	Report	Mendes da Silva (yellow card) 59'; Soriano (yellow card) 77' (yellow-red card) 90'; Hinteregger (yellow card) 90+3'	Stadium: Stade Jos Nosbaum; Attendance: 1,567; Referee: Anar Salmanov (Azerbaijan)

24 July 2012 Second Qualifying round 2nd leg	Red Bull Salzburg (Austria)	4–3 (4 – 4 (a) agg.)	(Luxembourg) F91 Dudelange	Wals-Siezenheim, Austria
18:30 CEST (UTC+2)	Jantscher (yellow card) 27' (goal) 28'; Hinteregger 37'; Schwegler (yellow card) 40'; Cristiano 81' (pen.); Zárate 82' (yellow card) 82'	Report	Steimetz 26', 57'; Benzouien (yellow card) 27' (yellow-red card) 74'; Joachim 48'	Stadium: Red Bull Arena; Attendance: 6,600; Referee: Pavle Radovanović (Montenegro)

== Statistics ==
As of match played 26 May 2013

=== Appearances and goals ===
No.	Pos	Nat	Player	Total		Bundesliga		Austrian Cup		UEFA Champions League	
No.	Pos	Nat	Player	Apps	Goals	Apps	Goals	Apps	Goals	Apps	Goals
1	GK	(Sweden) SWE	Eddie Gustafsson	9	0	5	0	4	0	0	0
5	DF	(Austria) AUT	Christopher Dibon	7	0	3+3	0	1	0	0	0
6	DF	(Switzerland) SUI	Christian Schwegler	21	0	17	0	2	0	2	0
8	DF	(Austria) AUT	Florian Klein	25	0	18+2	0	3	0	0+2	0
13	MF	(Austria) AUT	Stefan Ilsanker	31	0	18+8	0	1+3	0	1	0
14	MF	(Norway) NOR	Valon Berisha	33	6	29+1	6	2+1	0	0	0
15	DF	(Austria) AUT	Franz Schiemer	29	4	27	4	0+2	0	0	0
16	FW	(Norway) NOR	Håvard Nielsen	28	4	10+14	3	4	1	0	0
17	DF	(Austria) AUT	Andreas Ulmer	33	0	26	0	5	0	2	0
18	MF	(Slovakia) SVK	Dušan Švento	13	1	11	1	1	0	1	0
20	GK	(Germany) GER	Thomas Dähne	1	0	1	0	0	0	0	0
22	MF	(Austria) AUT	Stefan Hierländer	22	1	17+3	1	1	0	1	0
23	DF	(Uganda) UGA	Ibrahim Sekagya	21	2	12+5	1	2+1	1	1	0
24	MF	(Austria) AUT	Christoph Leitgeb	27	4	19+3	4	2+1	0	2	0
26	FW	(Spain) ESP	Jonathan Soriano	38	29	32+1	26	2+2	3	0+1	0
27	FW	(Brazil) BRA	Alan Carvalho	14	11	8+6	11	0	0	0	0
29	DF	(Brazil) BRA	Rodnei	18	0	13+2	0	3	0	0	0
31	FW	(Nigeria) NGR	Bright Edomwonyi	1	0	0+1	0	0	0	0	0
33	GK	(Germany) GER	Alexander Walke	33	0	30	0	1	0	2	0
36	DF	(Austria) AUT	Martin Hinteregger	29	3	16+8	2	3	0	2	1
37	MF	(Austria) AUT	Valentino Lazaro	5	0	2+3	0	0	0	0	0
39	DF	(Austria) AUT	Georg Teigl	39	6	8+25	5	3+2	1	1	0
40	FW	(Senegal) SEN	Sadio Mané	29	19	25+1	16	3	3	0	0
44	MF	(Slovenia) SLO	Kevin Kampl	27	4	23	4	4	0	0	0
45	DF	(Ghana) GHA	Isaac Vorsah	18	1	14+1	1	2+1	0	0	0
Players away on loan :
3	DF	(Brazil) BRA	Douglas da Silva	2	0	1+1	0	0	0	0	0
7	MF	(Austria) AUT	Jakob Jantscher	9	2	5+2	1	1	0	1	1
10	MF	(Brazil) BRA	Cristiano	3	2	0	0	0+1	1	1+1	1
34	FW	(Nigeria) NGR	Yusuf Otubanjo	1	0	0+1	0	0	0	0	0
Players who left Red Bull Salzburg during the season:
4	MF	(Netherlands) NED	David Mendes da Silva	9	0	4+2	0	1	0	2	0
9	FW	(Austria) AUT	Stefan Maierhofer	14	2	1+9	1	1+1	1	2	0
11	FW	(Argentina) ARG	Gonzalo Zárate	8	2	1+4	1	1	0	1+1	1
21	MF	(Sweden) SWE	Rasmus Lindgren	2	0	0	0	0+1	0	0+1	0

=== Goal scorers ===
Place	Position	Nation	Number	Name	Bundesliga	Austrian Cup	UEFA Champions League	Total
1	FW	(Spain)	26	Jonathan Soriano	26	3	0	3
2	FW	(Senegal)	40	Sadio Mané	16	3	0	3
3	FW	(Brazil)	27	Alan Carvalho	11	0	0	11
4	MF	(Norway)	14	Valon Berisha	6	0	0	6
4	DF	(Austria)	39	Georg Teigl	5	1	0	6
6	DF	(Austria)	15	Franz Schiemer	4	0	0	4
6	MF	(Austria)	24	Christoph Leitgeb	4	0	0	4
6	MF	(Slovenia)	44	Kevin Kampl	4	0	0	4
6	FW	(Norway)	16	Håvard Nielsen	3	1	0	4
6				Own goal	3	1	0	4
11	DF	(Austria)	36	Martin Hinteregger	2	0	1	3
12	DF	(Uganda)	23	Ibrahim Sekagya	1	1	0	2
12	FW	(Austria)	9	Stefan Maierhofer	1	1	0	2
12	MF	(Austria)	7	Jakob Jantscher	1	0	1	2
12	FW	(Argentina)	11	Gonzalo Zárate	1	0	1	2
12	MF	(Brazil)	10	Cristiano	0	1	1	2
17	MF	(Slovakia)	18	Dušan Švento	1	0	0	1
17	MF	(Austria)	22	Stefan Hierländer	1	0	0	1
17	DF	(Ghana)	45	Isaac Vorsah	1	0	0	1
				TOTALS	91	12	4	0

=== Clean sheets ===
Place	Position	Nation	Number	Name	Bundesliga	Austrian Cup	UEFA Champions League	Total
1	GK	(Germany)	33	Alexander Walke	10	1	0	1
2	GK	(Sweden)	1	Eddie Gustafsson	1	1	0	2
3	GK	(Germany)	20	Thomas Dähne	1	0	0	1
				TOTALS	12	2	0	14

=== Disciplinary record ===
Number	Nation	Position	Name	Bundesliga		Austrian Cup		UEFA Champions League		Total	
Number	Nation	Position	Name	Yellow card	Red card	Yellow card	Red card	Yellow card	Red card	Yellow card	Red card
5	(Austria)	DF	Christopher Dibon	1	0	0	0	0	0	1	0
6	(Switzerland)	DF	Christian Schwegler	3	0	0	0	1	0	4	0
7	(Austria)	MF	Jakob Jantscher	2	0	0	0	1	0	3	0
8	(Austria)	DF	Florian Klein	2	0	0	0	0	0	2	0
13	(Austria)	MF	Stefan Ilsanker	8	1	0	0	0	0	8	1
14	(Austria)	MF	Valon Berisha	1	0	0	0	0	0	1	0
15	(Austria)	DF	Franz Schiemer	9	0	1	0	0	0	10	0
17	(Austria)	DF	Andreas Ulmer	3	0	0	0	0	0	3	0
18	(Slovakia)	MF	Dušan Švento	1	0	0	0	0	0	1	0
22	(Austria)	MF	Stefan Hierländer	1	0	0	0	0	0	1	0
23	(Uganda)	DF	Ibrahim Sekagya	1	0	0	0	0	0	1	0
24	(Austria)	MF	Christoph Leitgeb	1	0	0	0	0	0	1	0
26	(Spain)	FW	Jonathan Soriano	1	0	0	0	2	1	3	1
27	(Brazil)	FW	Alan Carvalho	2	0	0	0	0	0	2	0
29	(Brazil)	DF	Rodnei	5	0	0	0	0	0	5	0
33	(Germany)	GK	Alexander Walke	1	0	0	0	0	0	1	0
36	(Austria)	MF	Martin Hinteregger	7	0	0	0	1	0	8	0
37	(Germany)	MF	Valentino Lazaro	2	0	0	0	0	0	2	0
39	(Austria)	DF	Georg Teigl	1	0	0	0	0	0	1	0
40	(Senegal)	FW	Sadio Mané	8	1	1	0	0	0	9	1
44	(Slovenia)	MF	Kevin Kampl	7	0	2	0	0	0	9	0
45	(Ghana)	DF	Isaac Vorsah	4	2	0	0	0	0	4	2
Players away on loan:
Players who left Red Bull Salzburg during the season:
4	(Netherlands)	MF	David Mendes da Silva	1	0	1	0	1	0	3	0
11	(Argentina)	FW	Gonzalo Zárate	0	1	0	0	1	0	1	1
			TOTALS	72	5	5	0	7	1	84	6
