= 2011–12 Austrian Football Bundesliga =

100th season of top-tier football league in Austria

Austrian Bundesliga
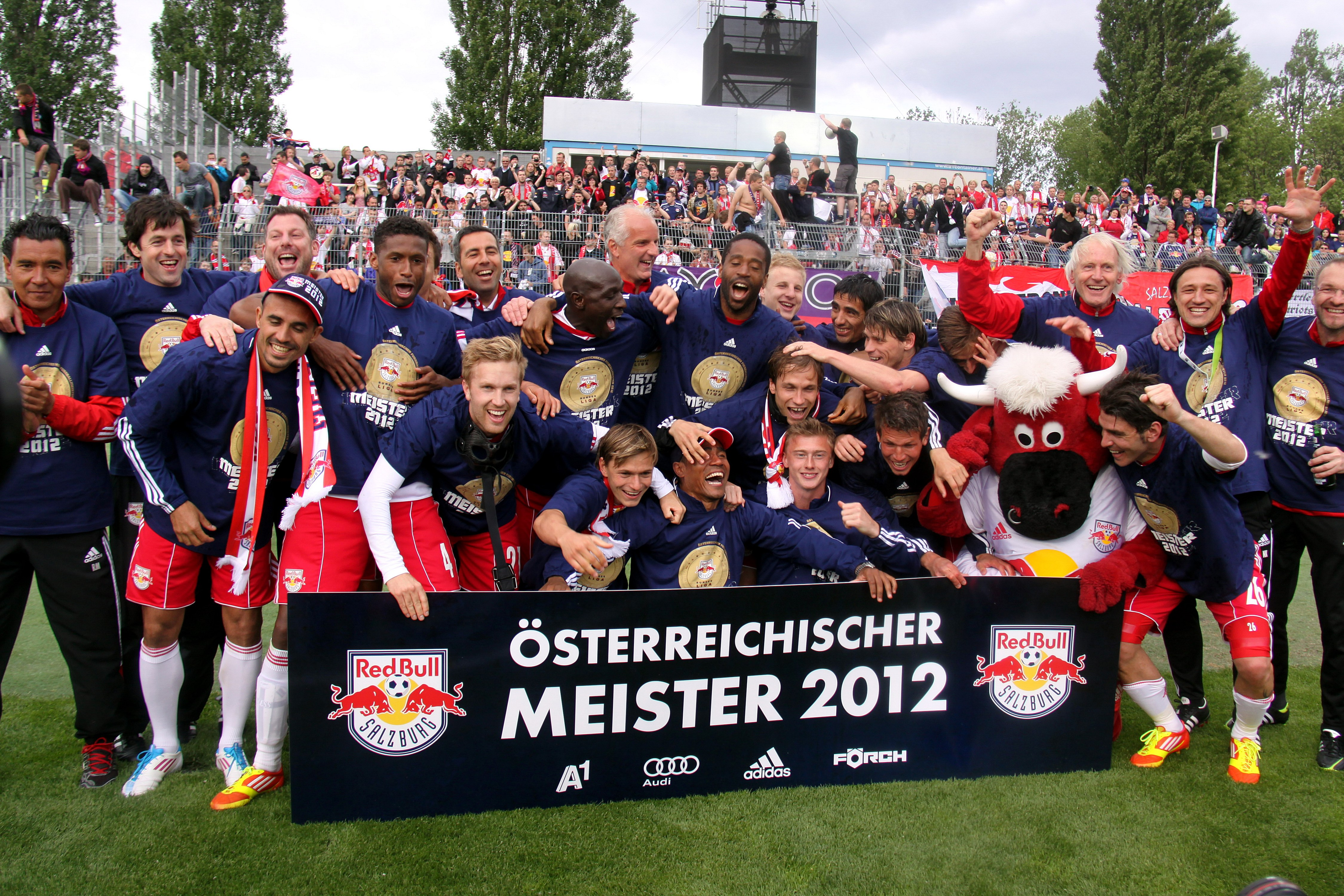
- Champions Red Bull Salzburg
- Season: 2011–12
- Dates: 16 July 2011 – 17 May 2012
- Champions: Red Bull Salzburg
- Relegated: Kapfenberger SV
- Champions League: Red Bull Salzburg
- Europa League: Rapid Wien; Admira Wacker Mödling; SV Ried
- Matches: 180
- Goals: 438 (2.43 per match)
- Top goalscorer: Jakob Jantscher; Stefan Maierhofer
- Total attendance: 1,297,902
- Average attendance: 7,211

The 2011–12 Austrian Football Bundesliga was the 100th season of top-tier football in Austria and was contested by ten teams. The Austrian football champion was determined in four heats. The championship began on 16 July 2011 and ended on 17 May 2012 with the completion of the 36th and final round.

The champion was Red Bull Salzburg for the seventh time. Rapid Wien was the runner-up by six points. While Salzburg became eligible for the qualification to the UEFA Champions League (second round) by winning the championship, Rapid and third-place Admira Wacker Mödling – the most successful promoted team in Bundesliga history – became eligible to play in a qualification for the UEFA Europa League (second round). Sixth-place SV Ried was also eligible because of its participation in the cup final of the Europa League.

Kapfenberger SV ended the championship in last place and therefore had to move down to the second-level First League after four seasons in the Bundesliga.

== Overview ==
Clubs in the tipp3-Bundesliga 2011–12

Supported by the sports betting provider tipp3 as the main sponsor, the Bundesliga is the highest league in Austrian soccer and held its 92nd season in 2011–12. The secondary sponsor is the mobile service provider T-Mobile Austria which is the reason why the official name of the league is tipp3-Bundesliga powered by T-Mobile. After six years, the promoted club FC Admira Wacker was again represented in Austria’s highest league. The team replaced the relegated club LASK Linz.

With the exception of Vorarlberg and Carinthia, all Austrian federal states were represented in the Bundesliga. Vienna, Lower Austria, and Styria each had two clubs.

The television provider sky Deutschland had the rights to show all Bundesliga matches in full length, which were broadcast in a pay television format on the channel sky sport austria. For the first time, the station showed all games not only in the well-known conference circuit but also individual matches. In addition, ORF had the broadcasting rights to each “Top Match of the Round” – mostly on Sundays, but also on Wednesdays for weekday rounds. This arrangement did not apply in the last two rounds, in which all games had to be held at the same time. Consequently, ORF was permitted to show a 45-minute summary of the remaining four matches in each round.

== Method ==
In the 2011–12 season, ten clubs competed against each other in a total of 36 rounds as had been done in previous years. The draw was redone after the ninth and 27th rounds. Each team thus played against every other team twice at home and twice away.

The champion Red Bull Salzburg was eligible for the second qualification round for the 2012–13 UEFA Champions League. The second and third place clubs (Rapid Wien and Trenkwalder Admira) as well as the Austrian Cup winner were eligible to start in the second or third qualification round for the 2012–13 UEFA Europa League. Should the Austrian Cup winner also be Austrian champion, the loser of the cup final would start in the Europa League. The tenth-place club, Kapfenberger SV, had to move down to the second level league, the First League.

== League table ==
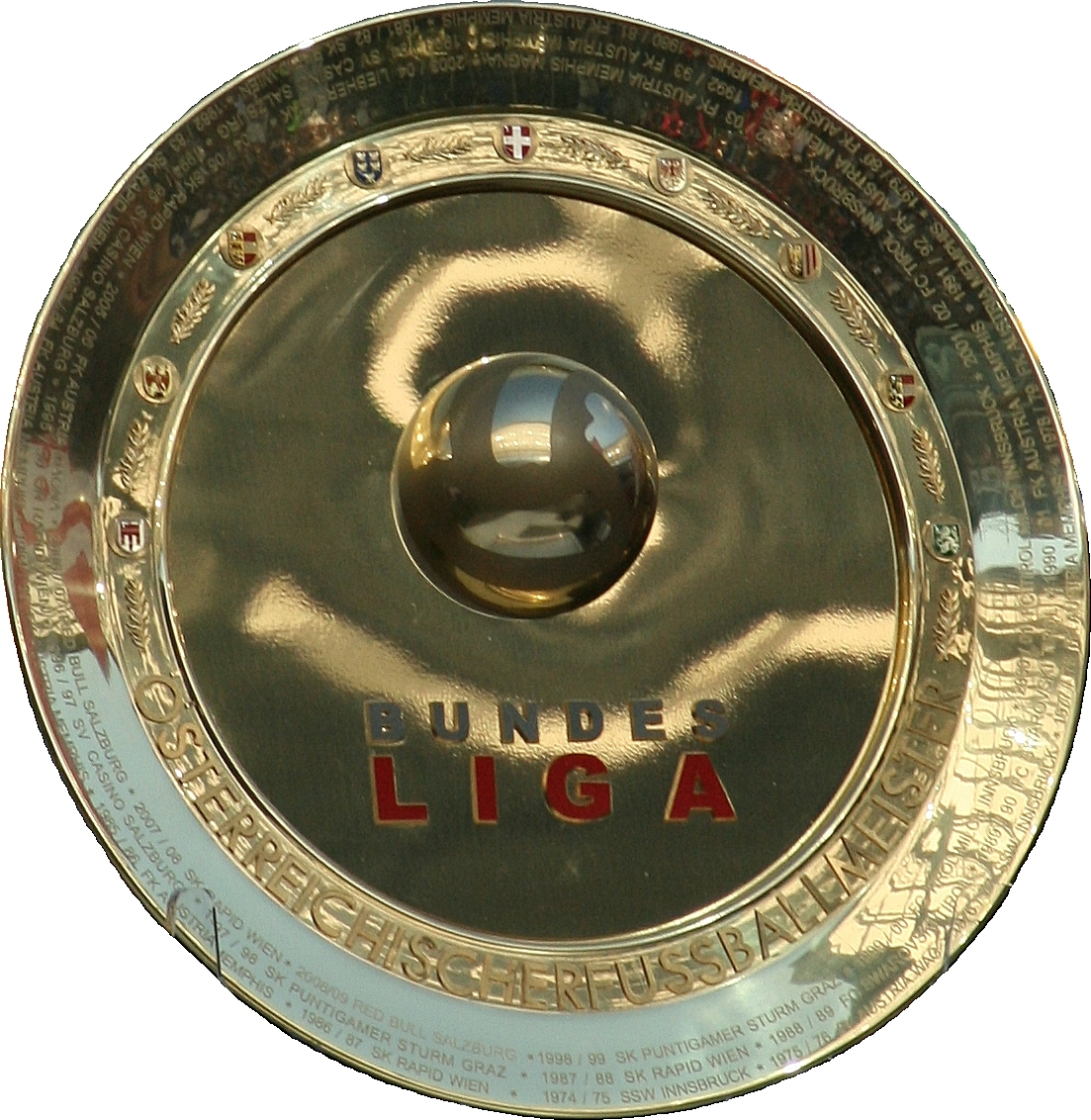
Austrian Football Bundesliga champion plate

| Pos | Team | Pld | W | D | L | GF | GA | GD | Pts | Qualification or relegation |
|---|---|---|---|---|---|---|---|---|---|---|
| 1 | Red Bull Salzburg (C) | 36 | 19 | 11 | 6 | 60 | 30 | +30 | 68 | Qualification to Champions League second qualifying round |
| 2 | Rapid Wien | 36 | 16 | 14 | 6 | 52 | 30 | +22 | 62 | Qualification to Europa League third qualifying round (Note: Since 2011–12 Austrian Cup winners Red Bull Salzburg qualified for the 2012–13 UEFA Champions League, so cup runners-up Ried qualified for the 2012–13 UEFA Europa League second qualifying round. Moreover, Rapid Wien were moved up a round as the cup winner spot was not used.) |
| 3 | Admira Wacker Mödling | 36 | 15 | 10 | 11 | 59 | 52 | +7 | 55 | Qualification to Europa League second qualifying round |
| 4 | Austria Wien | 36 | 14 | 12 | 10 | 52 | 44 | +8 | 54 | |
| 5 | Sturm Graz | 36 | 12 | 15 | 9 | 47 | 41 | +6 | 51 | |
| 6 | Ried | 36 | 11 | 15 | 10 | 44 | 38 | +6 | 48 | Qualification to Europa League second qualifying round |
| 7 | Wacker Innsbruck | 36 | 10 | 15 | 11 | 36 | 45 | −9 | 45 | |
| 8 | Mattersburg | 36 | 9 | 11 | 16 | 41 | 43 | −2 | 38 | |
| 9 | Wiener Neustadt | 36 | 6 | 15 | 15 | 26 | 51 | −25 | 33 | |
| 10 | Kapfenberger SV (R) | 36 | 5 | 8 | 23 | 21 | 64 | −43 | 23 | Relegation to Austrian Football First League |

Source: weltfussball.de (in German)
Rules for classification: 1) points; 2) goal difference; 3) number of goals scored.
(C) Champions; (R) Relegated

== Results ==
The match table below displays the results of all games in the season. The home team is listed in the left column and the away team in the upper row. The home team’s score is listed first.

=== First half of season ===
| Home \ Away | ADM | AWI | KAP | MAT | RWI | RBS | RIE | STU | WKR | WN |
|---|---|---|---|---|---|---|---|---|---|---|
| Admira Wacker Mödling | | 0–3 | 1–1 | 2–1 | 4–3 | 2–1 | 1–1 | 4–2 | 3–2 | 3–0 |
| Austria Wien | 2–4 | | 5–0 | 0–0 | 1–1 | 3–2 | 2–1 | 2–1 | 2–2 | 2–2 |
| Kapfenberger SV | 0–0 | 2–2 | | 1–0 | 0–0 | 1–3 | 1–3 | 3–0 | 2–3 | 0–2 |
| Mattersburg | 0–0 | 2–4 | 2–0 | | 1–2 | 3–0 | 2–3 | 3–3 | 1–1 | 1–2 |
| Rapid Wien | 2–0 | 0–3 | 5–1 | 1–1 | | 4–2 | 0–0 | 3–2 | 0–0 | 1–1 |
| Red Bull Salzburg | 2–1 | 2–0 | 6–0 | 0–0 | 0–0 | | 1–1 | 1–1 | 1–1 | 3–0 |
| Ried | 1–1 | 2–1 | 1–0 | 1–0 | 1–1 | 1–3 | | 1–1 | 1–0 | 2–0 |
| Sturm Graz | 3–1 | 5–1 | 1–0 | 2–2 | 1–0 | 2–1 | 1–0 | | 1–1 | 5–0 |
| Wacker Innsbruck | 2–2 | 0–0 | 3–1 | 1–1 | 0–3 | 0–1 | 0–5 | 1–0 | | 2–0 |
| Wiener Neustadt | 0–0 | 1–1 | 2–0 | 1–2 | 0–2 | 0–0 | 2–2 | 3–1 | 0–0 | |

Source: weltfussball.de (in German)
Legend: Blue = home team win; Yellow = draw; Red = away team win.

=== Second half of season ===
| Home \ Away | ADM | AWI | KAP | MAT | RWI | RBS | RIE | STU | WKR | WN |
|---|---|---|---|---|---|---|---|---|---|---|
| Admira Wacker Mödling | | 3–2 | 3–1 | 0–1 | 0–4 | 2–2 | 1–1 | 2–0 | 1–1 | 2–0 |
| Austria Wien | 2–1 | | 0–1 | 1–0 | 0–0 | 1–1 | 2–0 | 1–1 | 3–0 | 3–1 |
| Kapfenberger SV | 2–3 | 1–0 | | 1–1 | 0–2 | 0–1 | 0–0 | 0–0 | 0–1 | 1–0 |
| Mattersburg | 1–2 | 2–0 | 2–0 | | 0–1 | 0–1 | 4–1 | 0–2 | 0–1 | 0–1 |
| Rapid Wien | 2–1 | 0–0 | 3–0 | 1–1 | | 0–1 | 1–0 | 1–1 | 2–0 | 2–1 |
| Red Bull Salzburg | 2–0 | 3–0 | 2–0 | 0–1 | 3–1 | | 2–0 | 0–0 | 2–0 | 2–1 |
| Ried | 2–1 | 0–1 | 3–0 | 2–0 | 2–3 | 0–1 | | 1–1 | 1–1 | 2–2 |
| Sturm Graz | 0–3 | 3–1 | 2–1 | 1–0 | 0–0 | 2–2 | 0–0 | | 1–0 | 0–1 |
| Wacker Innsbruck | 2–1 | 0–1 | 2–0 | 3–6 | 2–1 | 1–1 | 0–0 | 1–1 | | 2–0 |
| Wiener Neustadt | 1–4 | 0–0 | 0–0 | 0–0 | 0–0 | 1–5 | 1–1 | 0–0 | 0–0 | |

Source: weltfussball.de (in German)
Legend: Blue = home team win; Yellow = draw; Red = away team win.

== Goal scoring statistics ==
| Rank | Player | Club | Goals |
|---|---|---|---|
| 1 | Jakob Jantscher | Red Bull Salzburg | 14 |
| 1 | Stefan Maierhofer | Red Bull Salzburg | 14 |
| 3 | Darko Bodul | Sturm Graz | 12 |
| 3 | Patrick Bürger | SV Mattersburg | 12 |
| 3 | Roland Linz | Austria Wien | 12 |
| 6 | Patrik Ježek | Admira Wacker Mödling | 11 |
| 7 | Philipp Hosiner | Admira Wacker Mödling | 10 |
| 8 | Deni Alar | Rapid Wien | 9 |
| 9 | Nacer Barazite | Austria Wien | 8 |
| 9 | Roman Kienast | Sturm Graz / Austria Wien | 8 |
| 9 | Atdhe Nuhiu | Rapid Wien | 8 |
| 9 | Christopher Wernitznig | Wacker Innsbruck | 8 |

League leader after each round:

== Cities, venues, and attendance ==
| City | Residents | Club | Stadium | Capacity | Total attendance | Average attendance | ± from 2010–11 |
|---|---|---|---|---|---|---|---|
| Graz | 257,328 | Sturm Graz | UPC-Arena | 15,322 | 194,824 | 10,824 | −10.66% |
| Innsbruck | 119,249 | Wacker Innsbruck | Tivoli-Neu | 15,400 | 116,679 | 6,482 | −38.64% |
| Kapfenberg | 21,812 | Kapfenberger SV | Franz-Fekete-Stadion | 7,500 | 59,730 | 3,318 | −2.35% |
| Mödling | 20,438 | Admira Wacker Mödling | Bundesstadion Südstadt | 12,000 | 87,272 | 4,848 | +141.07% |
| Mattersburg | 6,954 | SV Mattersburg | Pappelstadion | 15,700 | 77,980 | 4,332 | +11.32% |
| Ried im Innkreis | 11,409 | SV Ried | Keine Sorgen Arena | 7,600 | 84,700 | 5,261 | −20.24% |
| Salzburg | 147,571 | Red Bull Salzburg | Red Bull Arena | 30,188 | 177,300 | 9,850 | +0.60% |
| Vienna | 1,713,957 | Austria Wien | Generali Arena | 13,500 | 155,747 | 8,653 | −8.93% |
| Vienna | 1,713,957 | Rapid Wien | Gerhard-Hanappi-Stadion^{1} | 17,500 | 291,600 | 16,200 | +1.53% |
| Wiener Neustadt | 40,708 | Wiener Neustadt | Stadion Wiener Neustadt | 7,700 | 52,070 | 2,893 | −20.53% |
^{1} Rapid Wien held both of its home games against local rival Austria Wien in Ernst-Happel-Stadion which has a capacity of 50,865.

== The champions Red Bull Salzburg ==
- Goalkeepers: Alexander Walke (21 Games/0 Goals), Eddie Gustafsson (15/0),
- Defensemen: Ibrahim Sekagya (26/1) (c), Christian Schwegler (22/0), Martin Hinteregger (21/0), Andreas Ulmer (20/1), Stefan Hierländer (20/0), Franz Schiemer (19/0), Petri Pasanen (18/0), Douglas (11/0), Jefferson (8/0), Chema Antón (4/0),
- Midfielders: Dušan Švento (31/3), Jakob Jantscher (27/14), Gonzalo Zárate (25/1), Christoph Leitgeb (23/2), Georg Teigl (23/2), Rasmus Lindgren (20/1), Simon Cziommer (18/0), David Mendes da Silva (16/1), Cristiano (15/3), Luigi Bruins (3/0), Daniel Offenbacher (2/0), Stefan Savić (2/0), Felix Adjei (1/0),
- Strikers: Leonardo Santiago (30/4), Stefan Maierhofer (29/14), Roman Wallner (14/3), Jonathan Soriano (11/3), Alan (5/3), Alex Rafael (1/0).
- Management: Ricardo Moniz (Coach), Niko Kovač (Assistant coach), Herbert Ilsanker (Goalie coach), Oliver Glasner (Athletic coordinator).

== Attendances ==
| No. | Club | Average attendance |
|---|---|---|
| 1 | Rapid Wien | 15,832 |
| 2 | Sturm Graz | 10,827 |
| 3 | RB Salzburg | 9,851 |
| 4 | Austria Wien | 8,227 |
| 5 | Wacker Innsbruck | 6,392 |
| 6 | SV Ried | 4,917 |
| 7 | SV Mattersburg | 4,905 |
| 8 | Admira Wacker | 4,488 |
| 9 | Wiener Neustadt | 2,879 |
| 10 | Kapfenberger SV | 2,430 |
