= Daniel Offenbacher =

Austrian footballer (born 1992)

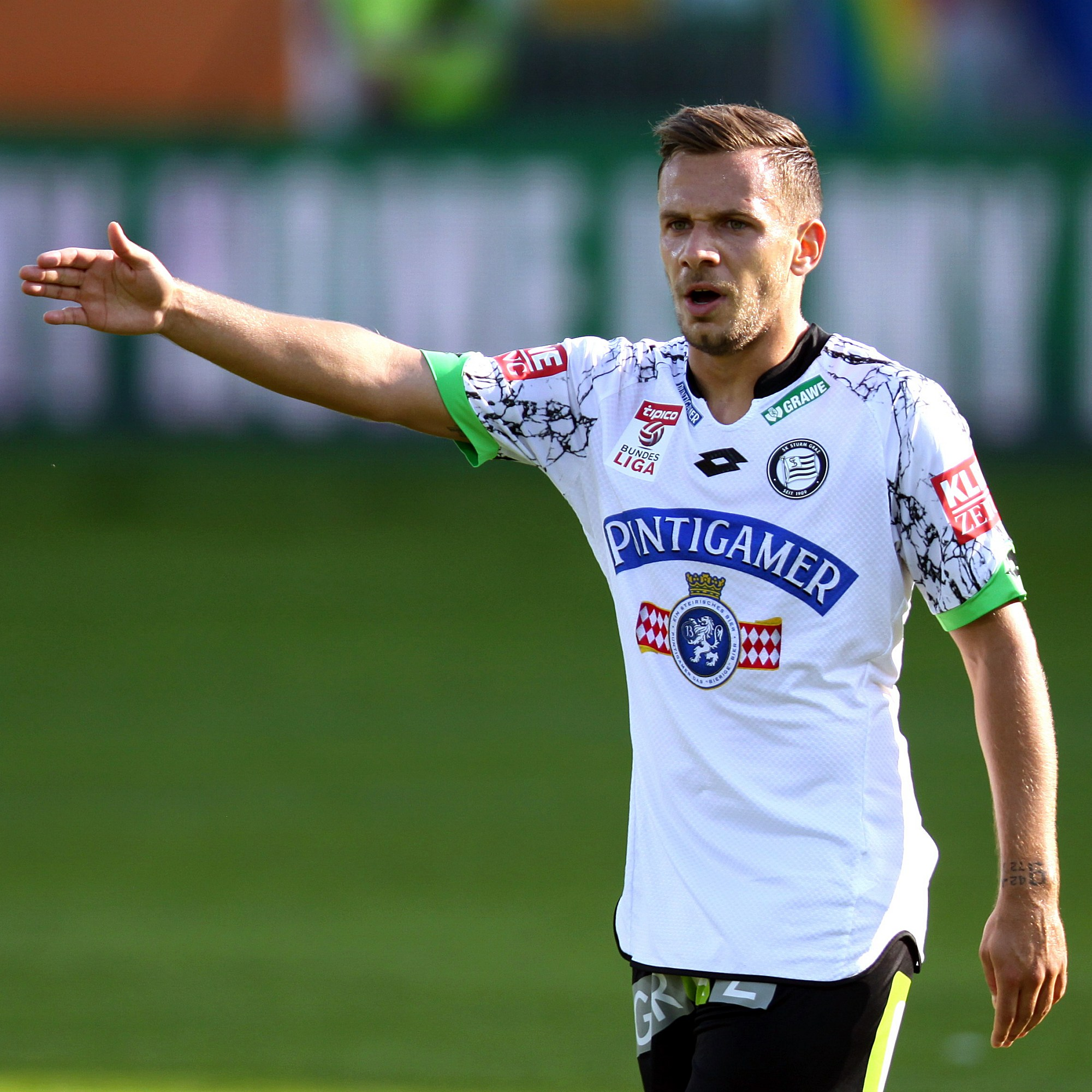
- Offenbacher with Sturm Graz in 2015

Personal information
- Date of birth: 18 February 1992 (age 34)
- Place of birth: Scheifling, Austria
- Height: 1.74 m (5 ft 9 in)
- Position: Midfielder

Youth career
- 1998–2006: SV Scheifling
- 2006–2010: Red Bull Salzburg

Senior career*
Years	Team	Apps	(Gls)
2009–2011	Red Bull Salzburg II	43	(11)
2010–2013	Red Bull Salzburg	6	(0)
2012	→ Blau-Weiß Linz (loan)	3	(0)
2012–2013	→ Wiener Neustadt (loan)	34	(3)
2013–2016	Sturm Graz	93	(5)
2013–2014	Sturm Graz II	1	(1)
2016–2018	Wolfsberger AC	61	(6)
2018	Sūduva	13	(3)
2019–2020	Hermannstadt	20	(0)
2020	Sūduva	10	(1)
2020–2022	SV Ried	48	(1)
2022–2025	Domžale	56	(0)

International career
2008–2009	Austria U16	1	(0)
2008–2009	Austria U17	12	(3)
2009–2010	Austria U18	5	(0)
2010	Austria U19	3	(2)
2011	Austria U20	2	(0)
2013–2014	Austria U21	12	(1)
- * Club domestic league appearances and goals as of 16 January 2025

Daniel Offenbacher (born 18 February 1992) is an Austrian footballer who plays as a midfielder.

== Club career ==
=== Scheifling ===
Offenbacher started playing football at his local club SV Scheifling in Styria.

=== Red Bull Salzburg ===
Offenbacher played in different youth teams and came to Red Bull Salzburg in January 2006 and played for the under-17 and under-19 squads. His professional debut was in the second squad, Red Bull Juniors, in the match versus Wacker Innsbruck on 16 October 2009. His first match in the first squad was exactly one year later in the match versus SV Kapfenberg where he substituted Ibrahim Sekagya in the 68th minute.

=== Blau-Weiß Linz (loan) ===
In January 2012, he went out on loan to Blau-Weiß Linz of the Austrian second division.

=== Sturm Graz ===
In May 2013, it was confirmed that he agreed a two-year contract with Sturm Graz.

=== Sūduva ===
In August 2018, he signed for Lithuanian club Sūduva on a free transfer.

=== Hermannstadt ===
On 11 January 2019, Offenbacher joined Romanian club Hermannstadt.

=== Return to Sūduva ===
On 25 February 2020, Offenbacher rejoined Lithuanian club Sūduva.

=== SV Ried ===
On 17 August 2020, he signed with SV Ried.

=== Domžale ===
On 31 August 2022, Offenbacher signed a two-year contract with Slovenian PrvaLiga side Domžale.

== Career statistics ==
As of match played 28 April 2018

Appearances and goals by club, season and competition
Club	Season	League			National cup		League cup		Other		Total	
Club	Season	Division	Apps	Goals	Apps	Goals	Apps	Goals	Apps	Goals	Apps	Goals
Red Bull Salzburg B	2009–10	Austrian Football First League	12	0	0	0	—				12	0
Red Bull Salzburg B	2010–11	Austrian Regionalliga	22	4	1	0	—				23	4
Red Bull Salzburg B	2011–12	Austrian Regionalliga	9	7	2	1	—				11	8
Red Bull Salzburg B	Total		43	11	3	1	0	0	0	0	46	12
Red Bull Salzburg	2010–11	Austrian Football Bundesliga	4	0	0	0	—		1 (Note: Appearance(s) in UEFA Europa League)	0	5	0
Red Bull Salzburg	2011–12	Austrian Football Championship	2	0	0	0	—		1	0	3	0
Red Bull Salzburg	Total		6	0	0	0	0	0	2	0	8	0
Blau-Weiß Linz (loan)	2011–12	Austrian Football Championship	3	0	0	0	—				3	0
Wiener Neustadt (loan)	2012–13	Austrian Football Bundesliga	34	3	2	0	—				36	3
Sturm Graz	2013–14	Austrian Football Bundesliga	31	1	5	4	—		2	0	38	5
Sturm Graz	2014–15	Austrian Football Bundesliga	32	3	3	0	—				35	3
Sturm Graz	2015–16	Austrian Football Bundesliga	30	1	4	0	—		1	0	35	1
Sturm Graz	Total		93	5	12	4	0	0	3	0	108	9
Sturm Graz B	2013–14	Austrian Regionalliga	1	1	0	0	—				1	1
Wolfsberger AC	2016–17	Austrian Football Bundesliga	30	3	1	0	—				31	3
Wolfsberger AC	2017–18	Austrian Football Bundesliga	28	2	2	0	—				30	2
Wolfsberger AC	Total		58	5	3	0	0	0	0	0	61	5
Career total			238	25	20	5	0	0	5	0	263	30

== Honours ==
Individual

- A Lyga Team of the Year: 2018
