= Ibrahim Sekagya =

Ugandan footballer (born 1980)

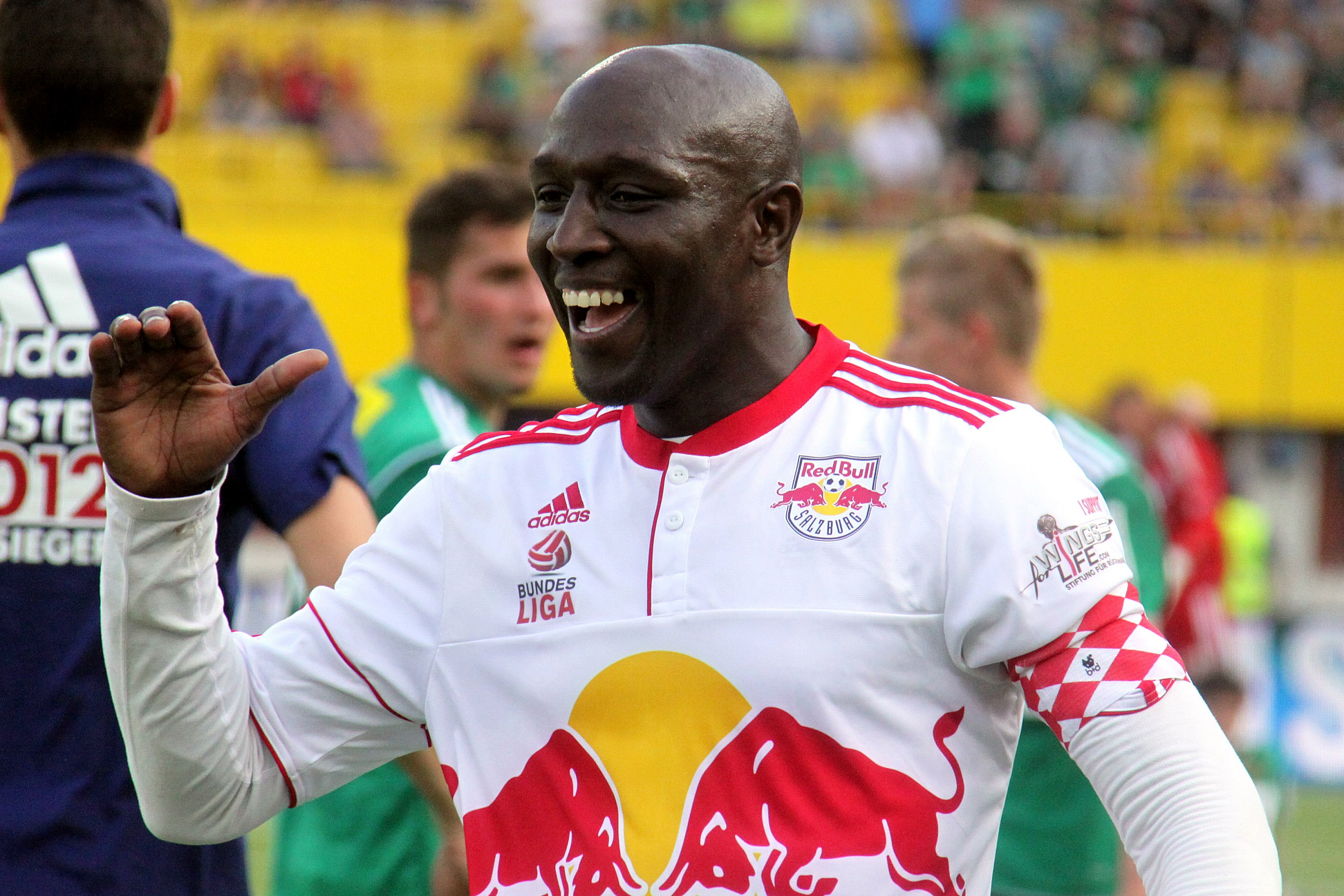
- Sekagya in 2012

Personal information
- Date of birth: 19 December 1980 (age 45)
- Place of birth: Kampala, Uganda
- Height: 1.86 m (6 ft 1 in)
- Position: Centre back

Team information
- Current team: New York Red Bulls (assistant)

Senior career*
| Years | Team | Apps | (Gls) |
| 1997–2001 | KCCA | 10 | (1) |
| 2001–2002 | Atlético de Rafaela | 38 | (2) |
| 2002–2005 | Ferro Carril Oeste | 96 | (4) |
| 2005–2007 | Arsenal de Sarandí | 62 | (2) |
| 2007–2013 | Red Bull Salzburg | 165 | (6) |
| 2013–2014 | New York Red Bulls | 33 | (2) |

International career
| 1999–2011 | Uganda | 35 | (3) |

Managerial career
- 2022: New York Red Bulls II (interim)
- 2023–2025: New York Red Bulls II
- * Club domestic league appearances and goals

Ibrahim Sekagya (born 19 December 1980) is a Ugandan former professional footballer who played as a centre back. He is currently an assistant coach for the New York Red Bulls in Major League Soccer.

== Club career ==
Born in Kawempe Kampala, as a boy, Sekagya started out his career playing on a bare surfaced pitch at Kawempe commonly known as 'kataka' before attending Kibuli Secondary School and later joining State House. Sekagya started his senior career with local giants Kampala City Council in 1992, before moving to Argentina in 1998 to try to make a career in football. His first Argentine club was Atlético de Rafaela in the Primera B Nacional. In 2002, he moved to Ferro Carril Oeste in the Primera B Metropolitana, subsequently helping the team to win the league and secure promotion to the Primera B Nacional. In 2005, he was signed by Arsenal de Sarandí of the Argentine Primera División, where he spent two seasons.

In June 2007, Sekagya signed a three-year contract with Red Bull Salzburg, the then current champions of the Austrian Bundesliga. He made his Bundesliga debut on 11 July 2007 in Salzburg's 4–1 win against Rheindorf Altach and scored his first league goal on 22 July 2007 to secure Salzburg a 2–2 away draw at Austria Wien. He quickly established himself as a regular with the club and finished his first season with 34 Bundesliga appearances to his name, scoring three goals in the league. In his six seasons at the club Sekagya appeared in 165 league matches and scored 6 goals. During this time he helped the club capture three Austrian Bundesliga titles and one Austrian Cup.

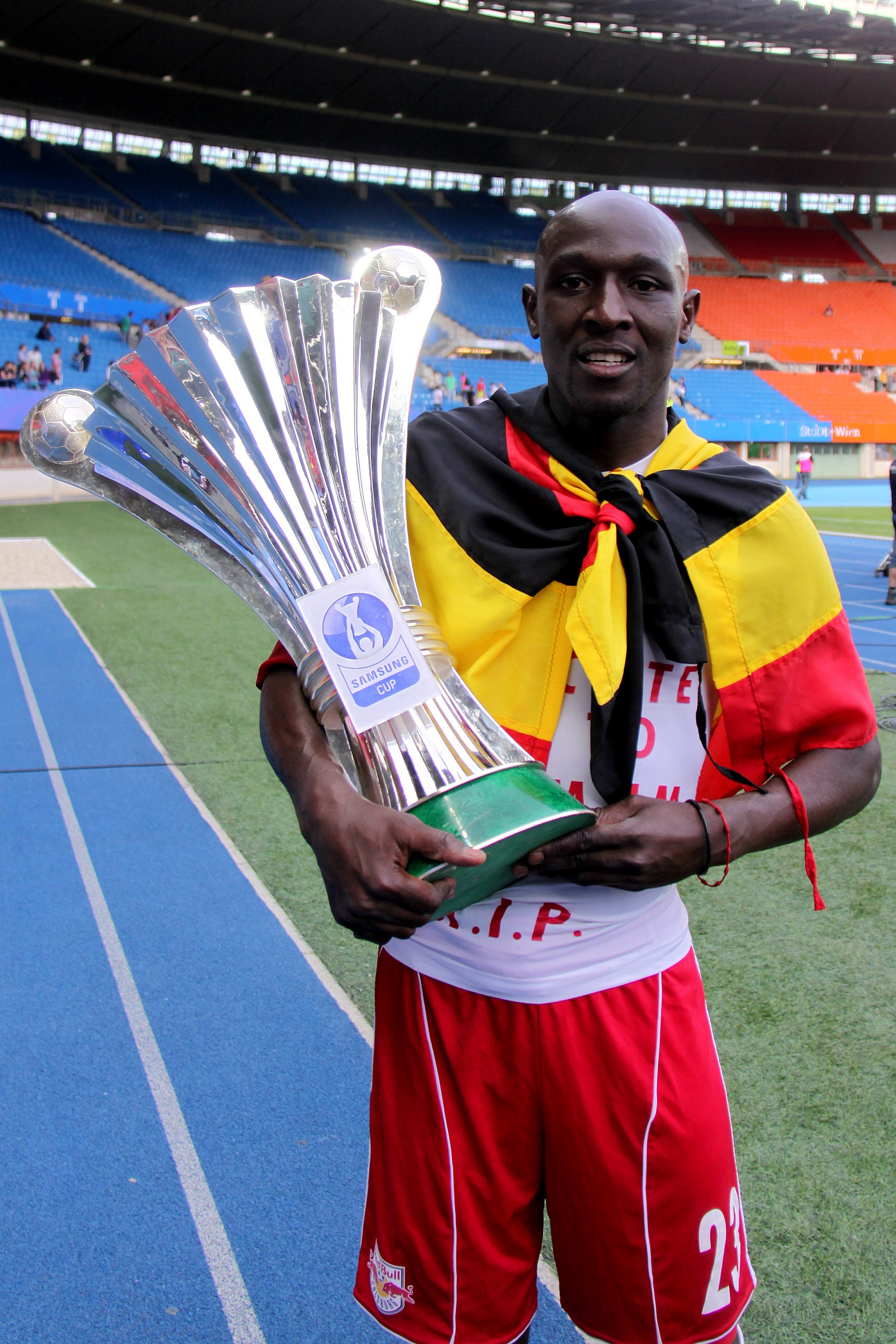
2011–12 Austrian Cup Final

On 11 July 2013, Sekagya joined MLS side New York Red Bulls on a free transfer, following his departure from sister club Red Bull Salzburg. On 4 August 2013 Sekagya made his debut for New York starting as a defensive midfielder in a 3–2 victory over Sporting Kansas City. On 27 October 2013, Sekagya scored the go ahead goal in the last game of the season against the Chicago Fire at Red Bull Arena to help his team to a 5–2 victory and become champions of the regular season. It was the club's first major trophy in their 17-year history. However, Sekagya's giveaway led to an equalizer in Houston's 2–1 victory that knocked New York out of the 2013 MLS Cup Playoffs. During the 2014 season Sekagya became a regular starter for New York helping the club reach the MLS Cup playoffs. Sekagya retired from professional football in early 2015.

== International career ==
Sekagya also played for the Ugandan national football team where he was the team's captain. He made 8 appearances and scored one goal in their qualifying campaign for the 2006 FIFA World Cup, as well as 3 appearances and a goal in the qualifiers for the 2010 FIFA World Cup.

== Coaching career ==
Following his retirement, Sekagya joined the coaching staff of the New York Red Bulls. On 2 July 2022, Sekagya was named interim head coach for the Red Bulls' USL Championship side, New York Red Bulls II.

== Career statistics ==
=== Club ===
Appearances and goals by club, season and competition
| Club | Season | League | | | National cup (Note: Includes Austrian Cup, US Open Cup) | | Continental | | Other | | Total | |
| Club | Season | Division | Apps | Goals | Apps | Goals | Apps | Goals | Apps | Goals | Apps | Goals |
|---|---|---|---|---|---|---|---|---|---|---|---|---|
| Atlético Rafaela | 2001–02 | Primera B Nacional | 38 | 2 | | | | | | | 38 | 2 |
| Ferro Carril Oeste | 2002–03 | Primera B Metropolitana | 30 | 2 | | | | | | | 30 | 2 |
| Ferro Carril Oeste | 2003–04 | Primera B Metropolitana | 34 | 2 | | | | | | | 34 | 2 |
| Ferro Carril Oeste | 2004–05 | Primera B Metropolitana | 32 | 0 | | | | | | | 32 | 0 |
| Ferro Carril Oeste | Total | | 96 | 4 | | | | | | | 96 | 4 |
| Arsenal de Sarandí | 2005–06 | Primera División | 29 | 1 | | | | | | | 29 | 1 |
| Arsenal de Sarandí | 2006–07 | Primera División | 33 | 1 | | | | | | | 33 | 1 |
| Arsenal de Sarandí | Total | | 62 | 2 | | | | | | | 62 | 2 |
| Red Bull Salzburg | 2007–08 | Austrian Bundesliga | 34 | 3 | 0 | 0 | 5 (Note: Four appearances in UEFA Champions League, one appearance in UEFA Cup) | 0 | — | | 39 | 3 |
| Red Bull Salzburg | 2008–09 | Austrian Bundesliga | 34 | 1 | 2 | 1 | 6 (Note: Appearances in UEFA Cup) | 1 | — | | 42 | 3 |
| Red Bull Salzburg | 2009–10 | Austrian Bundesliga | 24 | 0 | 2 | 1 | 11 (Note: Three appearances in UEFA Champions League, eight appearances in UEFA Europa League) | 0 | — | | 37 | 1 |
| Red Bull Salzburg | 2010–11 | Austrian Bundesliga | 30 | 0 | 1 | 0 | 12 (Note: Six appearances in UEFA Champions League, six appearances in UEFA Europa League) | 0 | — | | 43 | 0 |
| Red Bull Salzburg | 2011–12 | Austrian Bundesliga | 26 | 1 | 4 | 1 | 11 (Note: Appearances in UEFA Europa League) | 1 | — | | 41 | 3 |
| Red Bull Salzburg | 2012–13 | Austrian Bundesliga | 17 | 1 | 3 | 1 | 1 (Note: Appearance in UEFA Champions League) | 0 | — | | 21 | 2 |
| Red Bull Salzburg | Total | | 165 | 6 | 12 | 4 | 46 | 2 | 0 | 0 | 223 | 12 |
| New York Red Bulls | 2013 | Major League Soccer | 8 | 2 | — | | — | | 2 (Note: Appearances in MLS Cup playoffs) | 0 | 10 | 2 |
| New York Red Bulls | 2014 | Major League Soccer | 25 | 0 | 1 | 0 | 0 | 0 | 5 | 0 | 31 | 0 |
| New York Red Bulls | Total | | 33 | 2 | 1 | 0 | 0 | 0 | 7 | 0 | 41 | 2 |
| Total | | | 394 | 16 | 13 | 4 | 7 | 0 | 46 | 2 | 460 | 22 |

=== International ===
Scores and results list Uganda's goal tally first, score column indicates score after each Sekagya goal.

List of international goals scored by Ibrahim Sekagya
| No. | Date | Venue | Opponent | Score | Result | Competition |
|---|---|---|---|---|---|---|
| 1 | 6 June 2004 | Nelson Mandela National Stadium, Kampala, Uganda | DR Congo | 1–0 | 1–0 | 2006 FIFA World Cup qualification |
| 2 | 2 June 2007 | Nelson Mandela National Stadium, Kampala, Uganda | Nigeria | 2–1 | 2–1 | Africa Cup qualification |
| 3 | 31 May 2008 | Nelson Mandela National Stadium, Kampala, Uganda | Niger | 1–0 | 1–0 | 2010 FIFA World Cup qualification |

== Honours ==
Ferro

- Primera B Metropolitana: 2002–03

RB Salzburg

- Austrian Football Bundesliga: 2008–09, 2009–10, 2011–12
- Austrian Cup: 2012

New York Red Bulls

- MLS Supporters' Shield: 2013
