= Arvedin Terzić =

Bosnian footballer

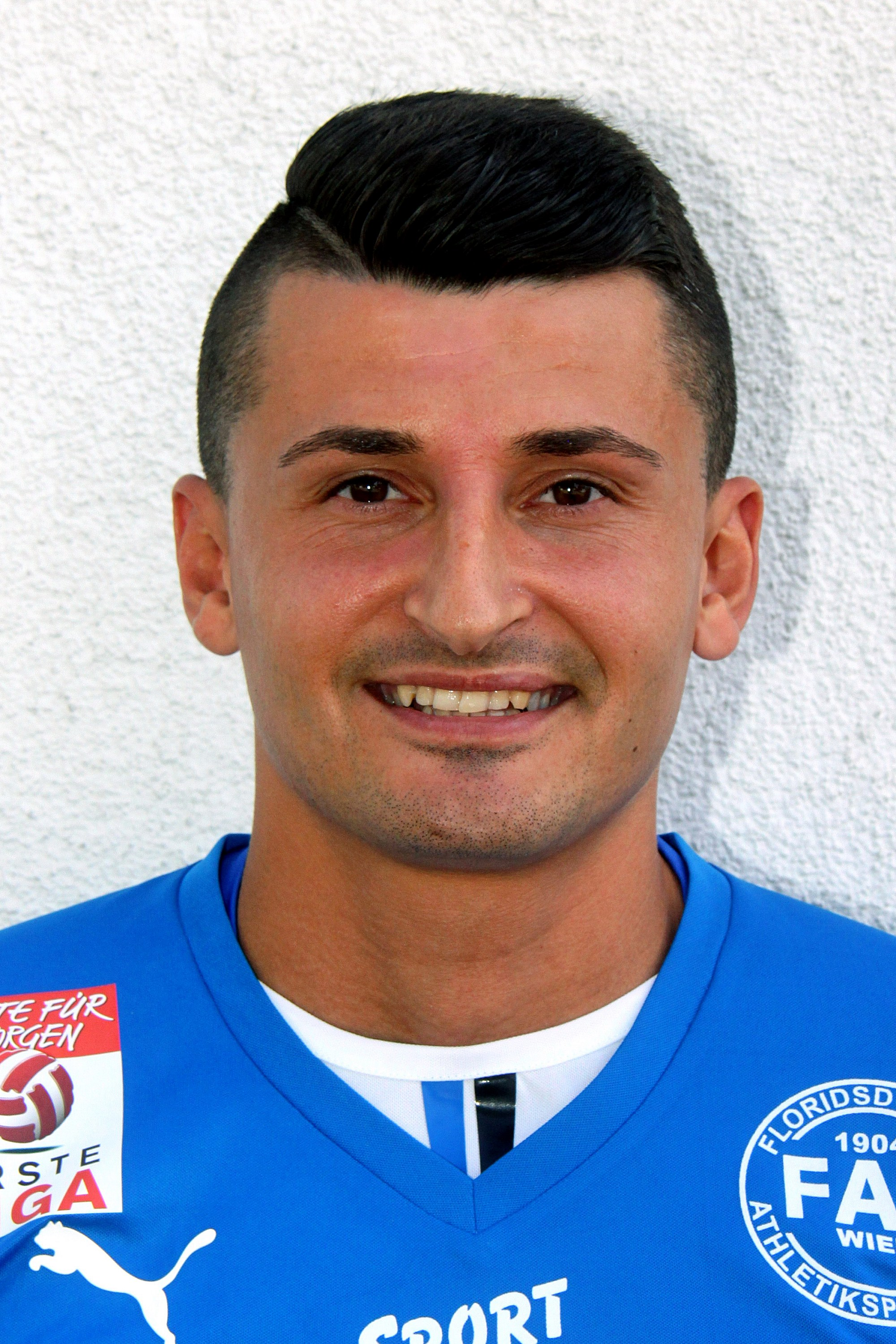
- Terzić in 2014

Personal information
- Date of birth: 2 April 1989 (age 37)
- Place of birth: Zvornik, SR Bosnia and Herzegovina, SFR Yugoslavia
- Height: 1.82 m (6 ft 0 in)
- Position: Left midfielder

Youth career
- 2005–2006: Wiener Linien
- 2006–2008: Rapid Wien

Senior career*
Years	Team	Apps	(Gls)
2008–2010	Rapid Wien II	27	(10)
2010–2012	Floridsdorfer AC	56	(12)
2012–2013	FC Lustenau	18	(5)
2013–2014	Wiener Neustadt	13	(1)
2014–2016	Floridsdorfer AC	30	(2)
2017	Kremser SC	7	(0)
2017–2018	Kottingbrunn	14	(3)
- * Club domestic league appearances and goals as of 2 February 2016

Arvedin Terzić (born 2 April 1989) is a Bosnian footballer who last played in Austria for Floridsdorfer AC.

== Club career ==
Terzić joined the youth set-up of Rapid Wien in 2006, and he advanced through the club's youth system, making his debut for the second team as a substitute for Christopher Drazan in a 2–0 win against Neusiedl am See in Regional League East on 7 March 2008. Terzić moved to fellow Regional League East side Floridsdorfer AC in 2010, before stepping up to the First League with FC Lustenau in the summer of 2012. He spent only half a season with Lustenau before being signed by Bundesliga club Wiener Neustadt after registering five goals and six assists in 18 league games.

Terzić made his Bundesliga debut on 23 February 2013 as a substitute in a 0–0 draw against SV Ried. A month after scoring in his first league start against Red Bull Salzburg on 2 March 2013, Terzić ruptured his Achilles tendon early in a game against Sturm Graz, an injury that ruled him out of the rest of the season and the start of the next.

He spent his latest seasons in the Austrian lower leagues.Austrian career stats - ÖFB
