= Bryan Mélisse =

French footballer (born 1989)

Personal information
- Date of birth: 25 March 1989 (age 37)
- Place of birth: Paris, France
- Height: 1.79 m (5 ft 10 in)
- Position: Left back

Team information
- Current team: Swift Hesperange

Senior career*
Years	Team	Apps	(Gls)
2008–2009	Louhans-Cuiseaux		
2009–2010	RFC Liège	12	(1)
2010–2013	Dudelange	65	(5)
2013–2014	SV Elversberg	11	(0)
2014–2016	Jeunesse Esch	44	(7)
2016–2019	Dudelange	49	(3)
2019–	Swift Hesperange	0	(0)
- * Club domestic league appearances and goals as of 18:40, 4 August 2019 (UTC)

Bryan Mélisse (born 25 March 1989) is a French professional footballer who plays for FC Swift Hesperange of the Luxembourg Division of Honour.

He received media attention during a UEFA Champions League qualifier game for making a horrible tackle.

== Career ==
On 20 June 2019, Mélisse joined FC Swift Hesperange.
