= Sebastian Siller =

Austrian footballer

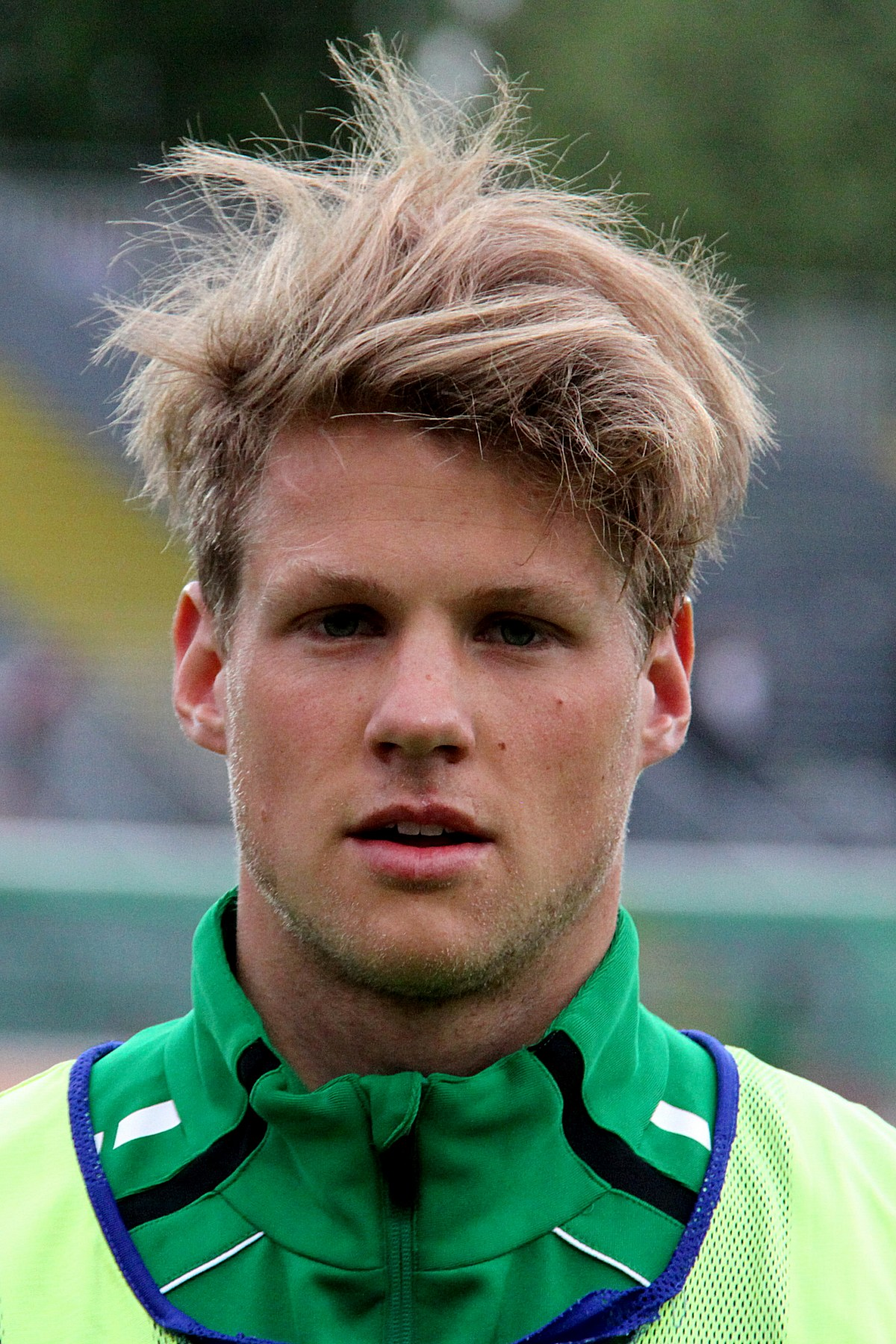

Personal information
- Date of birth: 18 May 1989 (age 37)
- Place of birth: Innsbruck, Austria
- Height: 1.84 m (6 ft 1/2 in)
- Position: Defender

Team information
- Current team: Wacker Innsbruck (manager)

Senior career*
Years	Team	Apps	(Gls)
2007–2008	SVG Reichenau	2	(0)
2008–2009	Wacker Innsbruck	0	(0)
2009–2011	SK Rapid Wien II	19	(0)
2011	WSG Wattens	13	(3)
2011–2013	SV Grödig	31	(2)
2013–2017	Wacker Innsbruck	100	(4)
2017–2022	SC Kundl	60	(7)
2022–2023	SV Fügen	21	(0)

Managerial career
- 2023–: Wacker Innsbruck
- * Club domestic league appearances and goals

Sebastian Siller (born 18 May 1989) is an Austrian football coach and a former player who is the manager of Austrian Regionalliga West club Wacker Innsbruck.
