= Gonzalo Zárate =

Argentine footballer (born 1984)

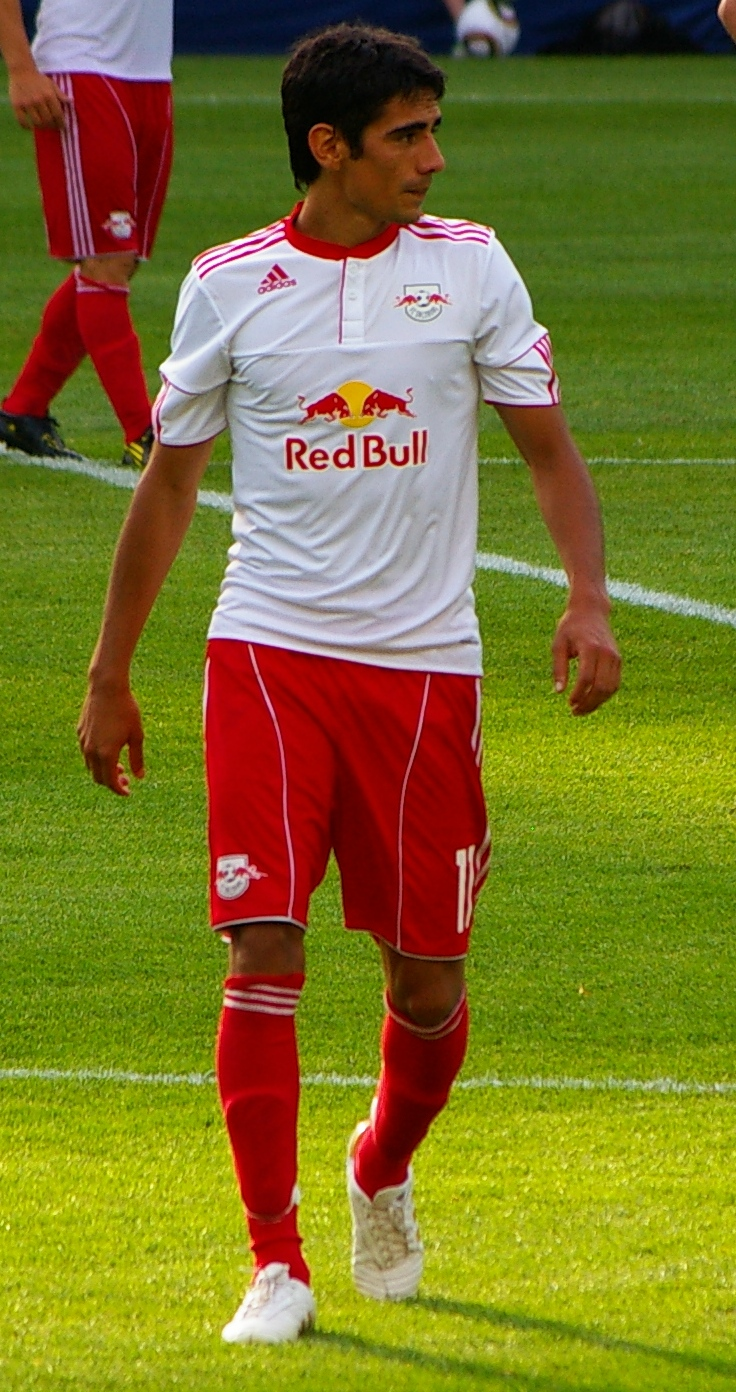

Personal information
- Full name: Gonzalo Eulogio Zárate
- Date of birth: 6 August 1984 (age 42)
- Place of birth: Rosario, Santa Fe, Argentina
- Height: 1.83 m (6 ft 0 in)
- Position: Forward

Youth career
- Lanús
- 2005–2006: Tiro Federal

Senior career*
Years	Team	Apps	(Gls)
2006–2007	PCC San José	12	(4)
2007–2008	Kriens	5	(5)
2007–2008	→ Grasshoppers (loan)	24	(3)
2008–2010	Grasshoppers	65	(25)
2010–2012	Red Bull Salzburg	65	(7)
2012–2015	Young Boys	66	(9)
2015–2016	Thun	27	(0)
2016–2017	Vaduz	31	(4)
2017–2018	Lausanne-Sport	24	(5)
2018–2019	Enosis Neon Paralimni	24	(1)
2019–2020	Black Stars Basel	10	(1)

Managerial career
- 2020–202?: Grasshoppers (youth coach)
- * Club domestic league appearances and goals

Gonzalo Eulogio Zárate (born 6 August 1984) is a retired Argentine footballer who played as a forward.

== Career ==
In Summer 2007, Zárate joined SC Kriens of Swiss Challenge League. His high goal scoring rate attracted Grasshopper, and there was made a loan deal on 15 September 2007.

Before moving to Switzerland, he played for PCC San José of the local league, called Asociación Rosarina de Fútbol in the Primera División B in Argentina. He also played in the youth of Lanús and Tiro Federal.

On 18 May 2010 it was announced that Zárate was signed by Red Bull Salzburg. On 13 July Zárate scored his first goal in his first match for Red Bull Salzburg. The goal was in the Champions-League qualifying match versus HB Torshaven.

In September 2019, Zárate joined Swiss Promotion League club FC Black Stars Basel. After retiring, Zárate was hired as a youth coach at Grasshopper Club Zürich.

== Career statistics ==
As of match played on 22 April 2019

Appearances and goals by club, season and competition
Club	Season	League			Cup		League Cup		Other		Total	
Club	Season	Division	Apps	Goals	Apps	Goals	Apps	Goals	Apps	Goals	Apps	Goals
Grasshopper	2007–08	Swiss Super League	?	3	0	0	—				?	3
Grasshopper	2008–09	Swiss Super League	30	8	0	0	—				30	8
Grasshopper	2009–10	Swiss Super League	35	14	0	0	—				35	14
Grasshopper	Total		65	25	0	0	0	0	0	0	65	25
Salzburg	2010–11	Austrian Football Bundesliga	35	5	0	0	—		11	2	46	7
Salzburg	2011–12	Austrian Football Championship	25	1	4	0	—		8	1	37	2
Salzburg	2012–13	Austrian Football Bundesliga	5	1	1	0	—		2	1	8	2
Salzburg	Total		65	7	5	0	0	0	21	4	91	11
Young Boys	2012–13	Swiss Super League	16	2	1	0	—		6	2	23	4
Young Boys	2013–14	Swiss Super League	29	5	1	0	—				30	5
Young Boys	2014–15	Swiss Super League	21	2	0	0	—		4	0	25	2
Young Boys	Total		66	9	2	0	0	0	10	2	78	11
Thun	2015–16	Swiss Super League	27	0	3	0	—		2	0	32	0
Vaduz	2016–17	Swiss Super League	31	4	0	0	—		4	0	35	4
Vaduz	2017–18	Swiss Super League	0	0	0	0	—		1	1	1	1
Vaduz	Total		31	4	0	0	0	0	5	1	36	5
Lausanne-Sport	2017–18	Swiss Super League	24	5	1	0	—				25	5
Enosis Neon Paralimni	2018–19	Cypriot First Division	24	1	6	0	—				30	1
Career totals			302	51	17	0	0	0	38	7	357	58

== Honours ==
FC Red Bull Salzburg

- Austrian Football Bundesliga: 2012
- Austrian Cup: 2012

FC Vaduz

- Liechtenstein Football Cup: 2016-17
