= Christian Dintar =

Austrian football referee

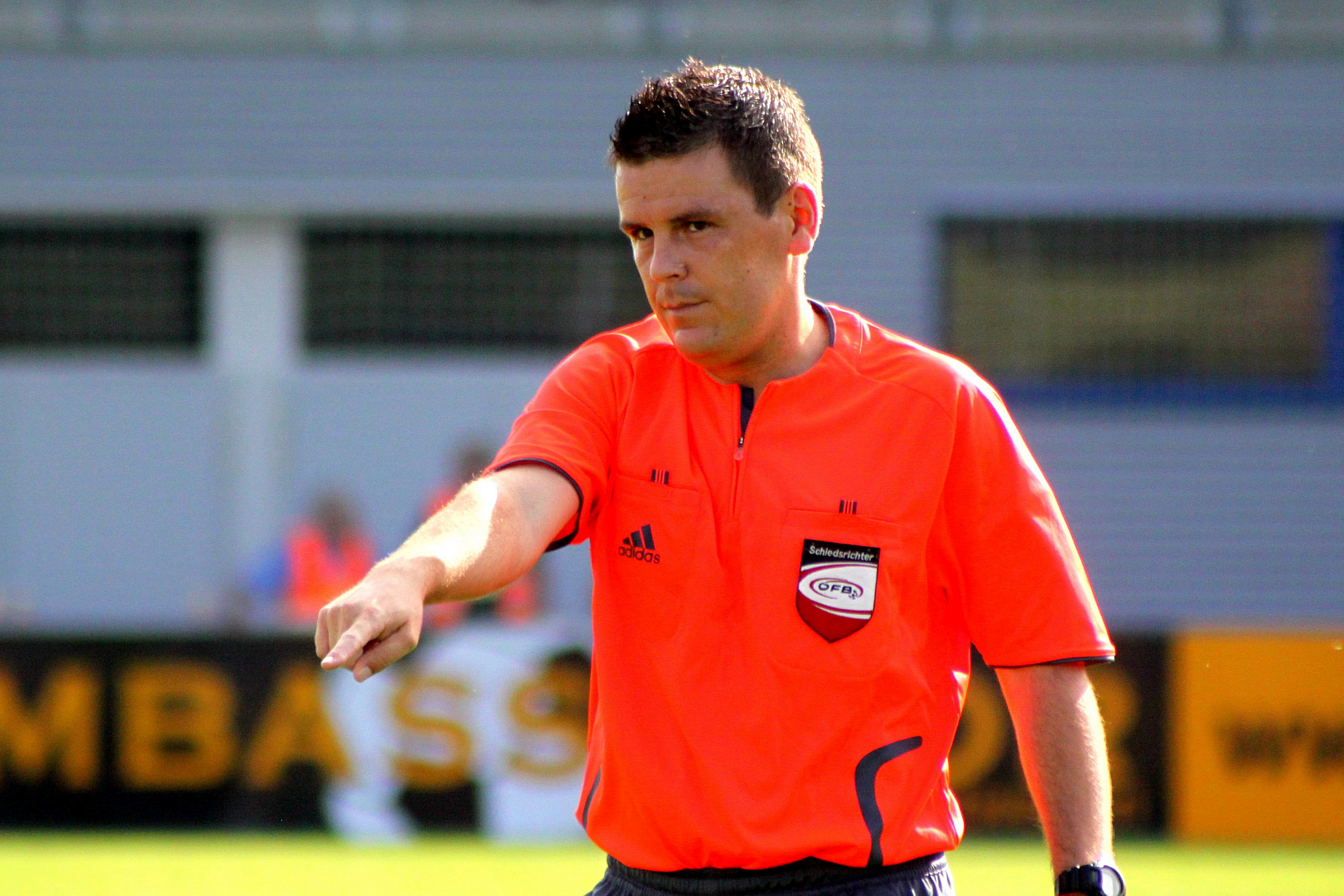
- Christian Dintar in 2009
- Born: March 22, 1974 (age 52); Graz, Austria

Domestic
Years	League	Role
1997–	Austrian Football Association	Referee
2006–	Austrian Cup	Referee
2006–2015	Austrian Football First League	Referee
2010–2015	Austrian Football Bundesliga	Referee

Christian Dintar (born 22 March 1974 in Graz) is an Austrian football referee. He refereed matches in the Austrian Football Bundesliga from 2010 until 2015.

== Career as a football referee ==
After Dintar had played football in various lower league clubs, he suffered a serious motorcycle accident. His colleague, Paul Pethö, a referee in Burgenland, persuaded Dintar after his recovery, to take the exam for football referees. This he took in 1997.

Because of good performance, Dintar rose quickly as referee in the Austrian Regional League. Already in the 2002/03 season, Dintar was assistant Bundesliga referee alongside Wolfgang Falb and Thomas Paukowits.

On 28 March 2006, Dintar officiated a qualifying match, in the Austrian Football First League, between FC Kufstein and DSV Leoben (0:2). On 1 July 2006, he was awarded the Bundesliga status as referee. Dintar was included in the squad for the First League and on 11 August 2006 refereed his first official match (FC Gratkorn against FC Kärnten) as Bundesliga referee in the second highest Austrian league.

Starting in the 2010/11 season, Dintar officiated matches in the highest Austrian league, the Bundesliga.

On 3 March 2010, Dintar refereed the U20 international frendliy match between Germany and Switzerland (1:1), his first international match.

In summer 2015, Dintar ended his career as a Bundesliga referee at the age of 41. But he continues to officiate matches in the Regional League East and Burgenland.
