= Dennis Mimm =

Austrian footballer

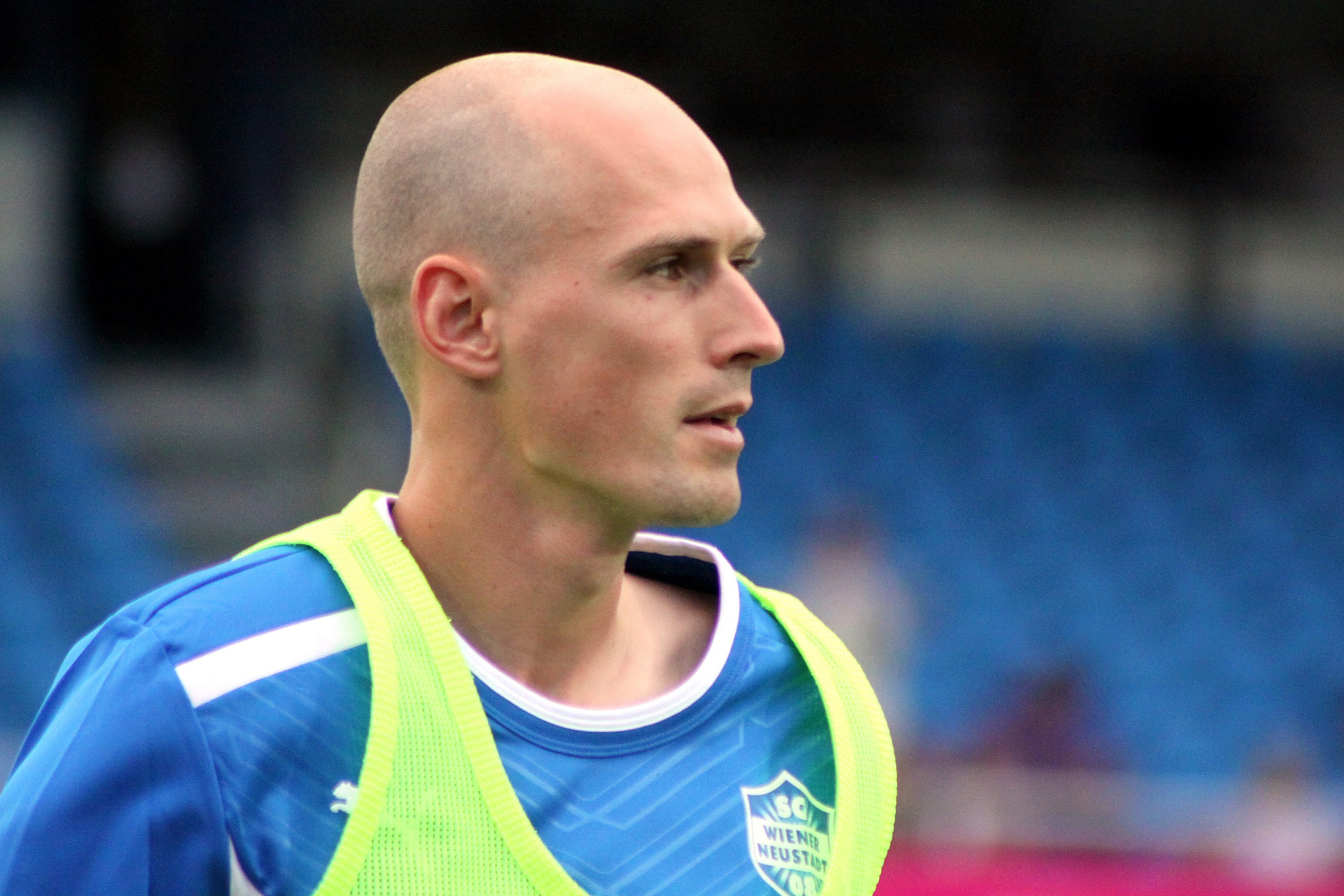

Personal information
- Full name: Dennis Mimm
- Date of birth: 18 March 1983 (age 43)
- Place of birth: Austria
- Height: 1.85 m (6 ft 1 in)
- Position: Defender

Team information
- Current team: SC Wiener Neustadt
- Number: 6

Youth career
- 1990–1998: Innsbrucker AC
- 1998–2001: FC Tirol Innsbruck

Senior career*
Years	Team	Apps	(Gls)
2001–2002	WSG Wattens	10	(0)
2002–2008	FC Wacker Tirol	151	(14)
2008–2009	SC Rheindorf Altach	27	(0)
2009–2010	FC Pasching	14	(1)
2010	SpVgg Unterhaching	10	(1)
2011	FC Pasching	15	(2)
2011–2012	FC Lustenau 07	35	(3)
2012–2015	SC Wiener Neustadt	74	(5)
- * Club domestic league appearances and goals

Dennis Mimm (born 18 March 1983) is an Austrian football player who played for SC Wiener Neustadt.

== Career ==
Mimm played professional football in the Austrian Football Bundesliga with FC Wacker Tirol. After several seasons of professional football, Mimm joined amateurs FC Pasching and led them to the Regionalliga Mitte title in 2009–10.
