= Jefferson Cardoso =

Brazilian footballer

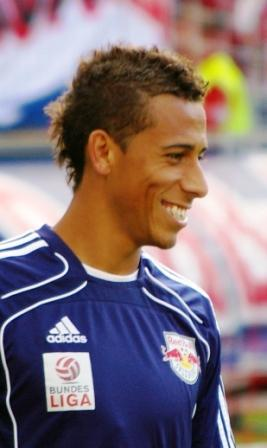

Personal information
- Full name: Jefferson Cardoso dos Santos
- Date of birth: February 15, 1986 (age 40)
- Place of birth: São Vicente, São Paulo, Brazil
- Height: 1.77 m (5 ft 9 1/2 in)
- Position: Left back

Team information
- Current team: Brasiliense

Youth career
- 2006: São Vicente Atlético Clube
- 2007–2008: Jabaquara Atlético Clube

Senior career*
Years	Team	Apps	(Gls)
2009–2011	Red Bull Brasil	78	(4)
2011–2012	Red Bull Salzburg	8	(0)
2012	Ituano	0	(0)
2012	Guaratinguetá	5	(0)
2013	Brasiliense	2	(0)
2014–	Guarani		
- * Club domestic league appearances and goals as of August 14, 2014

Jefferson Cardoso dos Santos (born February 15, 1986) is a Brazilian footballer who plays for Guarani in the Campeonato Brasileiro Série C.
