= Thomas Fröschl =

Austrian footballer

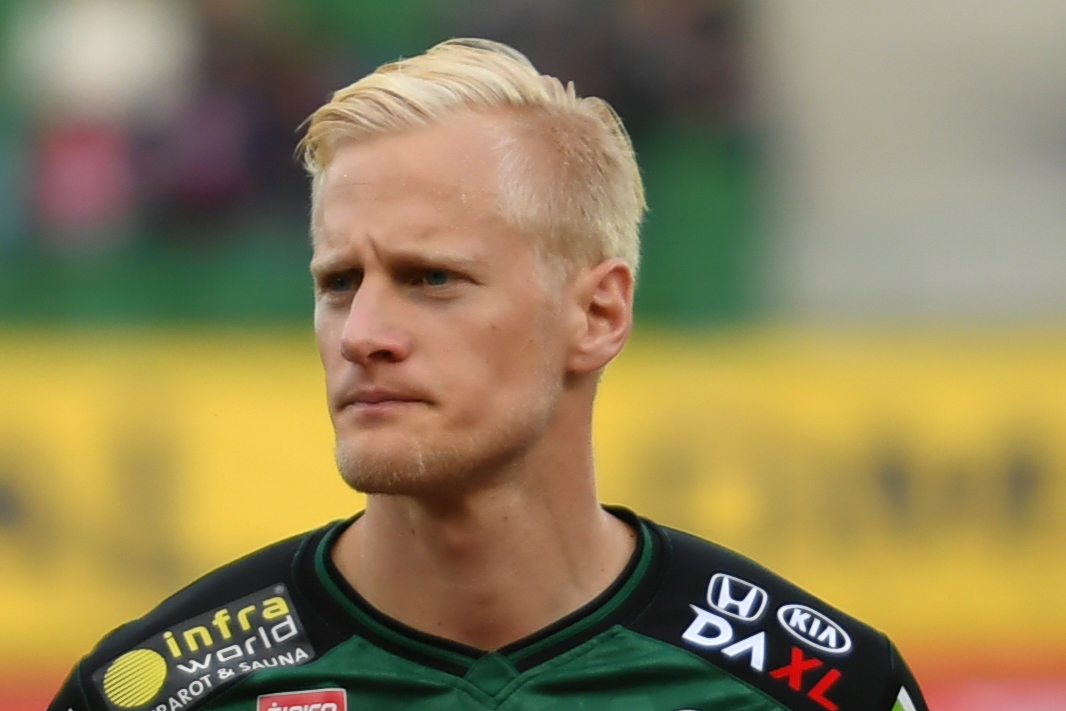

Personal information
- Date of birth: 20 September 1988 (age 38)
- Place of birth: Steyr, Austria
- Height: 1.84 m (6 ft 0 in)
- Position: Forward

Team information
- Current team: ASK St. Valentin
- Number: 9

Youth career
- 1995–2004: SC St. Pantaleon-Erla

Senior career*
Years	Team	Apps	(Gls)
2004–2007	SC St. Pantaleon-Erla	73	(36)
2007–2008	St. Florian	25	(11)
2008–2013	Rapid Wien	0	(0)
2008–2009	→ DSV Leoben (loan)	18	(3)
2008–2009	→ Rapid Wien II	13	(6)
2009–2010	→ Lustenau 07 (loan)	28	(7)
2010–2012	→ St. Pölten (loan)	46	(17)
2012–2013	→ Wiener Neustadt (loan)	24	(3)
2013–2014	Wiener Neustadt	26	(5)
2014–2015	SV Ried	33	(7)
2015–2016	LASK Linz	19	(4)
2016–2018	SV Ried	72	(15)
2018–2020	Blau-Weiß Linz	35	(8)
2020–	ASK St. Valentin	0	(0)
- * Club domestic league appearances and goals as of 11 June 2020

Thomas Fröschl (born 20 September 1988) is an Austrian footballer who plays for ASK St. Valentin.
