= Jiří Lenko =

Czech footballer (born 1985)

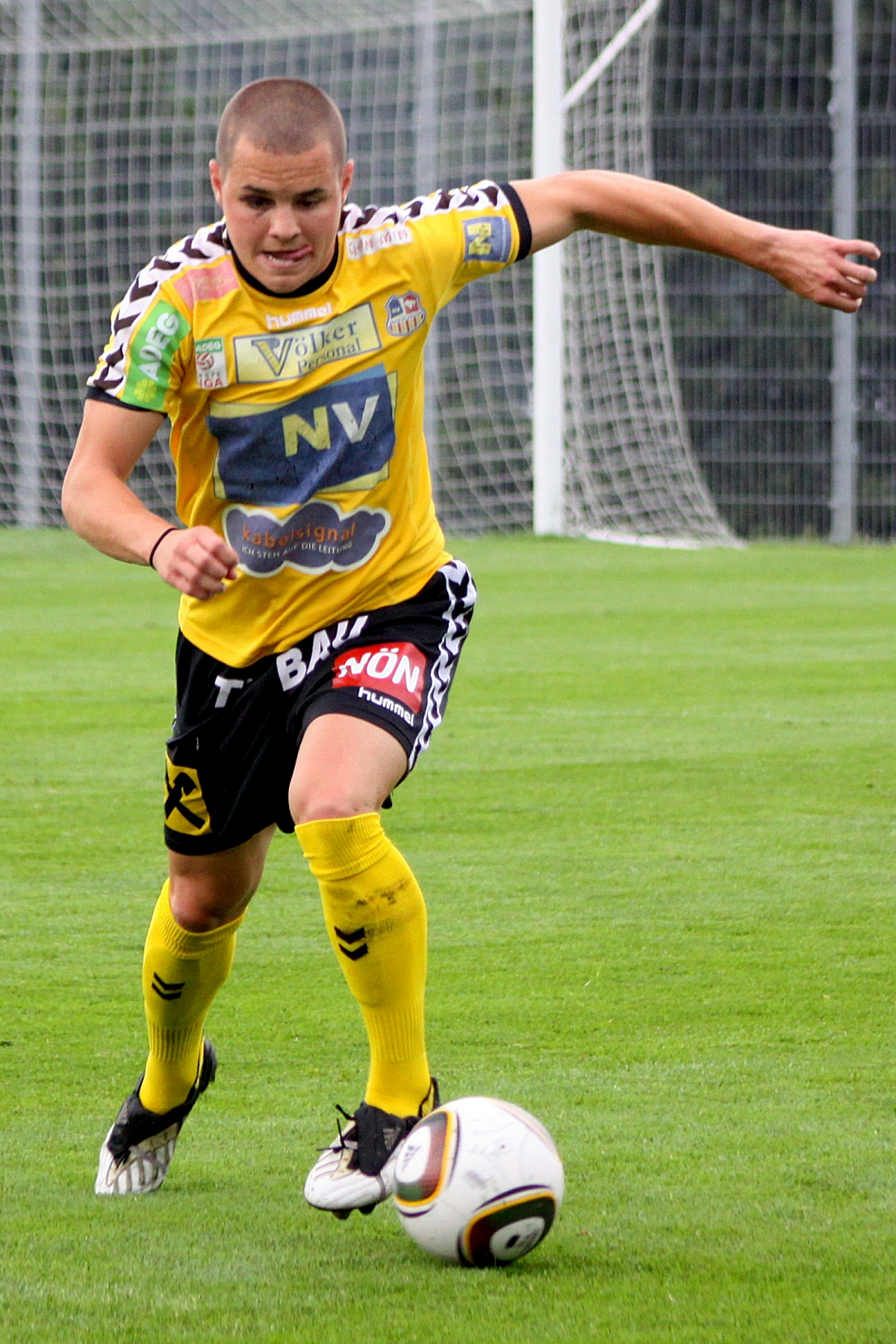

Personal information
- Date of birth: 29 April 1985 (age 41)
- Place of birth: Hrušovany nad Jevišovkou, Czechoslovakia
- Height: 1.77 m (5 ft 10 in)
- Position: Defender

Senior career*
Years	Team	Apps	(Gls)
2003–2005	Rapid Wien "B"	50	(6)
2005	SK Rapid Wien	2	(0)
2005–2006	Kapfenberger SV	12	(1)
2006	FC Zbrojovka Brno	12	(0)
2006–2007	Union Perg	23	(6)
2007–2008	FC Superfund	?	(?)
2008–2009	Lokomotiv Mezdra	0	(0)
2009–2011	SKN St. Pölten	48	(2)
2011–2012	SV Grödig	27	(0)
2012–2013	SC Wiener Neustadt	16	(0)
2014–2015	SC Ritzing	29	(5)
2015–2022	First Vienna FC		
- * Club domestic league appearances and goals

Jiří Lenko (born 29 April 1985) is a Czech former professional football player. Lenko played mostly as a left-sided defender.

== Career ==
Lenko started his career at Austrian team Rapid Wien, where he played from 2003 to 2005. He then joined Kapfenberger SV, where he spent almost one years, before moving to FC Zbrojovka Brno in his country. He joined Austrian club FC Superfund early in June 2007. From June 2008 played in Bulgarian club Lokomotiv Mezdra.
