= Alexander Aschauer =

Austrian footballer (born 1992)

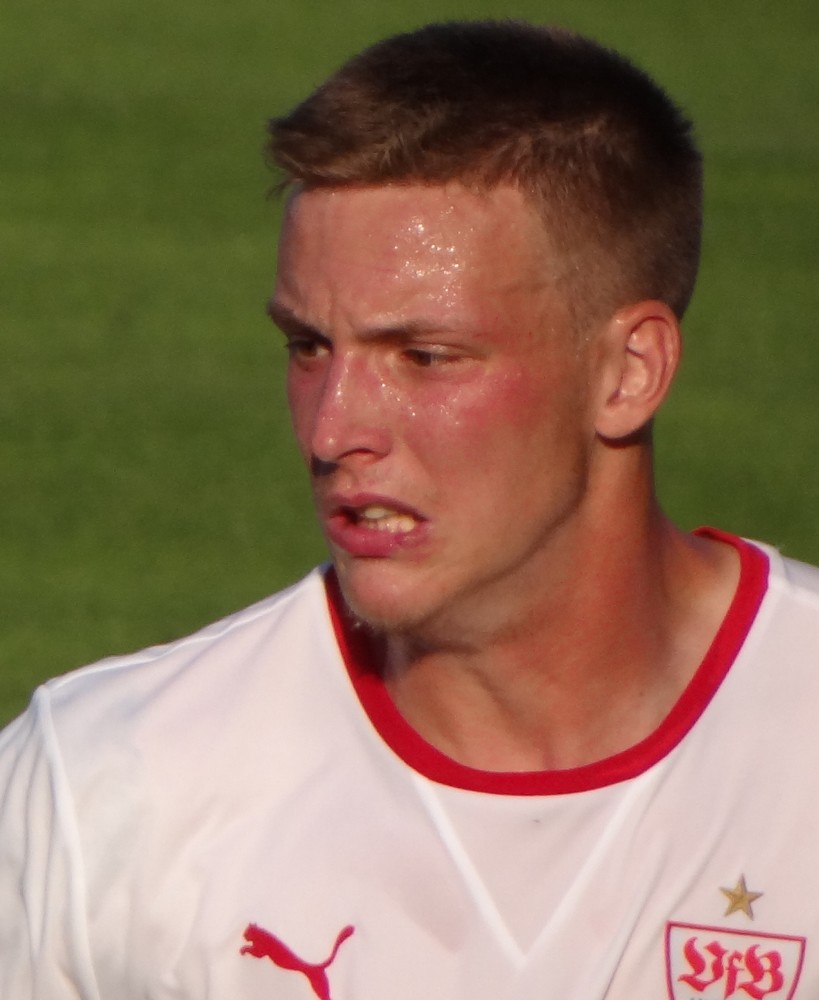
- Aschauer with VfB Stuttgart II

Personal information
- Date of birth: 14 March 1992 (age 34)
- Place of birth: Wien, Austria
- Position: Forward

Team information
- Current team: Normannia Gmünd
- Number: 9

Senior career*
Years	Team	Apps	(Gls)
2007–2008	Austria Wien II	1	(0)
2008–2010	AKA Red Bull Salzburg	31	(9)
2008–2013	Red Bull Juniors Salzburg	30	(10)
2009–2013	Red Bull Salzburg	1	(0)
2011–2012	→ VfB Stuttgart II (loan)	42	(6)
2012–2013	→ Wacker Burghausen (loan)	13	(0)
2013–2014	First Vienna	23	(6)
2014–2016	Austria Lustenau	45	(6)
2016–2018	Sonnenhof Großaspach	27	(2)
2018–2019	FSV Frankfurt	23	(2)
2019–	Normannia Gmünd	28	(5)
- * Club domestic league appearances and goals as of 20:45, 4 January 2021 (UTC)

Alexander Aschauer (born 14 March 1992) is an Austrian professional footballer who plays for 1. FC Normannia Gmünd as a striker.

In January 2011 Aschauer was loaned out to VfB Stuttgart until June 2012. After Stuttgart did not take advantage of a contract option to sign Aschauer permanently, Red Bull Salzburg loaned Aschauer out to SV Wacker Burghausen for the 2012–13 season.
