= Ben Payal =

Luxembourgish footballer

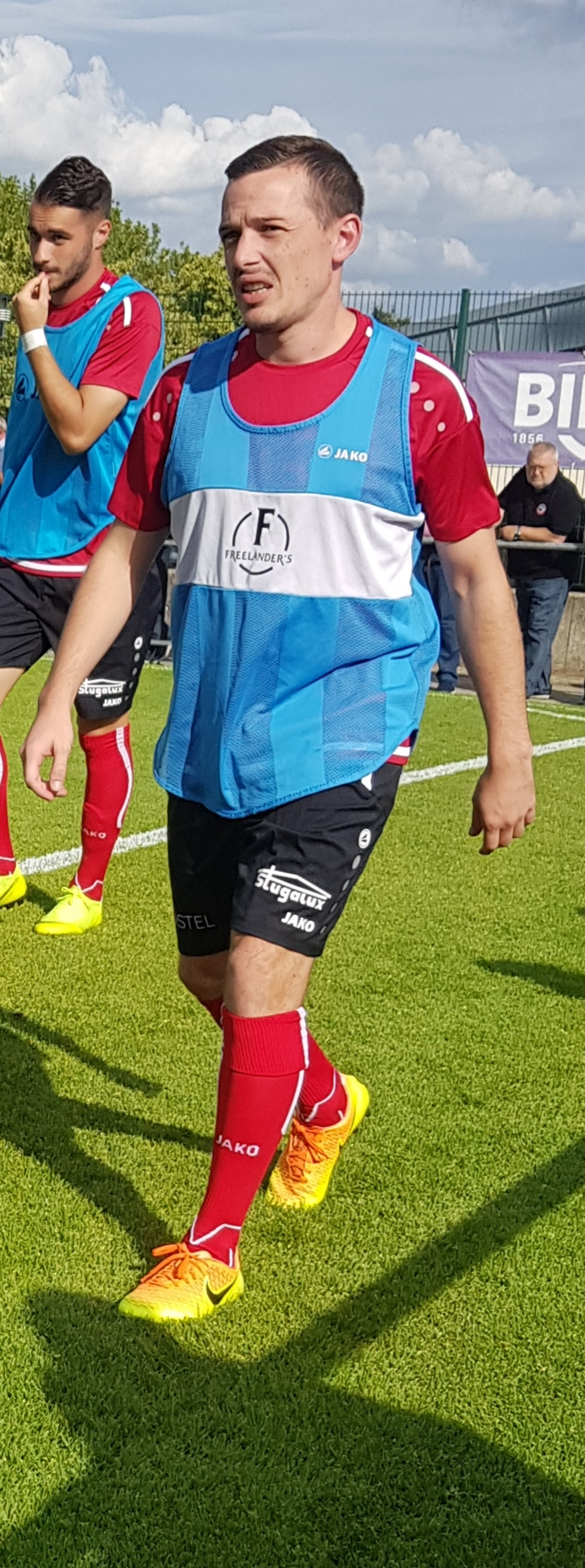

Personal information
- Full name: Ben Payal
- Date of birth: 8 September 1988 (age 38)
- Place of birth: Luxembourg (city), Luxembourg
- Position: Right winger

Youth career
- Lorentzweiler

Senior career*
Years	Team	Apps	(Gls)
2005–2007	Jeunesse Esch	37	(0)
2007–2013	F91 Dudelange	90	(0)
2013–2016	Fola Esch	52	(0)
2016–2022	UNA Strassen	105	(1)

International career^{‡}
2006–2016	Luxembourg	73	(0)
- * Club domestic league appearances and goals as of 27 June 2023 ‡ National team caps and goals as of 26 March 2017

Ben Payal (born 8 September 1988) is a retired Luxembourgish footballer who last played as a midfielder for UNA Strassen.

== Club career ==
Payal made his senior debut for Jeunesse Esch in the 2005/2006 season at 17 years of age. He joined Dudelange in summer 2007. After playing for Fola Esch from 2013 to 2016, he joined UNA Strassen in 2016. He was released by mutual agreement in 2022, and retired from football soon thereafter.

== International career ==
He made his debut for Luxembourg in a September 2006 friendly match against Latvia. He earned 73 caps, scoring no goals.

== Honours ==
- Luxembourg National Division: 1

2008
