= Franz Schiemer =

Austrian footballer (born 1986)

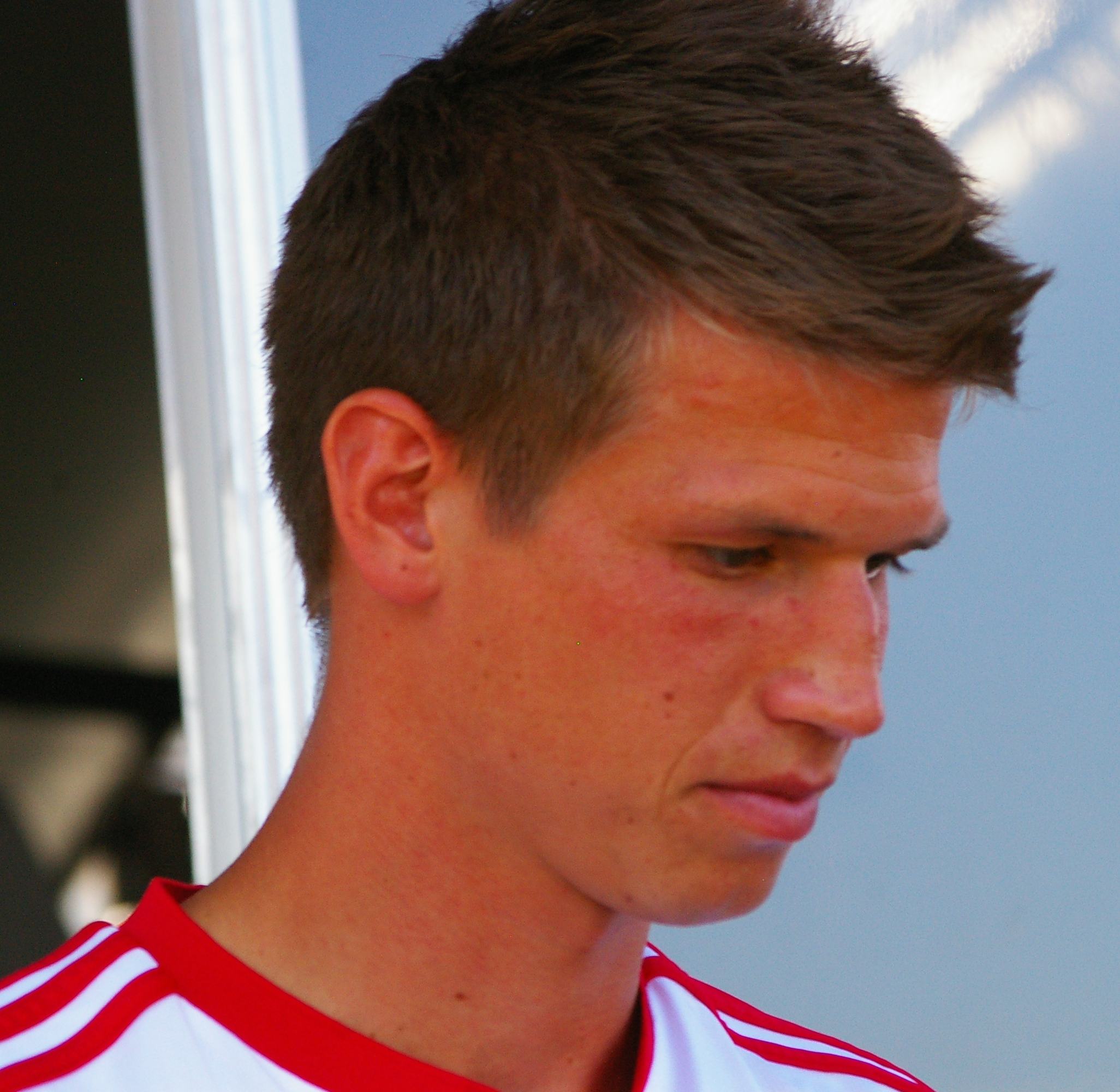
- Schiemer with Red Bull Salzburg in 2010

Personal information
- Date of birth: 21 March 1986 (age 40)
- Place of birth: Haag am Hausruck, Austria
- Height: 1.85 m (6 ft 1 in)
- Position: Defender

Youth career
- Taufkirchen an der Trattnach
- 1996–2003: SV Ried

Senior career*
Years	Team	Apps	(Gls)
2003–2005	SV Ried	53	(5)
2005–2009	Austria Vienna	71	(5)
2009–2015	Red Bull Salzburg	113	(8)
Total		237	(18)

International career
	Austria U17	20	(0)
	Austria U21	21	(2)
2007–2015	Austria	19	(4)

Managerial career
- 2016–2017: FC Liefering (assistant)
- 2017–2018: SV Ried (sporting director)
- 2018: SV Ried (caretaker)
- 2019–2021: Red Bull Salzburg (assistant)
- 2022: Leeds United (assistant)
- * Club domestic league appearances and goals

Franz "Franky" Schiemer (born 21 March 1986) is an Austrian football coach and former player. He played as a defender and was most recently assistant head coach of Leeds United.

== Club career ==
Schiemer was born in Haag am Hausruck, Upper Austria. He started his career in his hometown Taufkirchen an der Pram as striker. Schiemer came through the youth ranks at SV Ried to make his professional debut in the 2003–04 season at just 17 years of age. The same year he was third in the U17 European Championship. In 2005, he joined Austria Wien. On 9 April 2009, FC Red Bull Salzburg has for the season 2009–10 Schiemer from league rivals Austria Wien required, the 23-year-old Austria national team player signed with the Red Bulls a contract until 30 June 2012.

He won the Austrian Football Bundesliga two times, once with Austria Wien (2006) and once with FC Red Bull Salzburg (2010).

== International career ==
Schiemer made his debut for Austria in October 2007 against Switzerland but was overlooked for the EURO 2008 squad. He has earned 18 caps and 4 goals scored (on 1 August 2008).

== Retirement and coaching career ==
On 1 January 2015, Schiemer announced his retirement from football after an injury plagued career and became assistance coach with FC Liefering. On 13 February 2017, Schiemer was appointed as the new sports director of SV Ried.

On 2 April 2018, head coach Lassaad Chabbi was on leave and Schiemer was appointed interim as head coach, until he was replaced by Thomas Weissenböck on 18 April 2018. On 7 June 2018, Schiemer was confirmed in his position as sporting director of SV Ried. On 14 November 2018, Schiemer announced his resignation

For the 2019–20 season he became Jesse Marsch's assistant coach at FC Red Bull Salzburg.

== Career statistics ==
#	Date	Venue	Opponent	Score	Result	Competition
1	9 September 2009	Bukarest	Romania	1-1	1-1	2010 FIFA World Cup qualifying
2	3 March 2010	Vienna	Denmark	1-0	2-1	Friendly
3	12 October 2010	Brussels	Belgium	1-1	4-4	Uefa Euro 2012 qualifying
4	12 October 2010	Brussels	Belgium	2-3	4-4	Uefa Euro 2012 qualifying

== Honours ==
- Austrian Football Bundesliga (4):
  - 2006, 2010, 2012, 2014
- Austrian Cup (4):
  - 2007, 2009, 2012, 2014
- U17-European Championship 2003
  - 3rd
