= Dušan Švento =

Slovak footballer

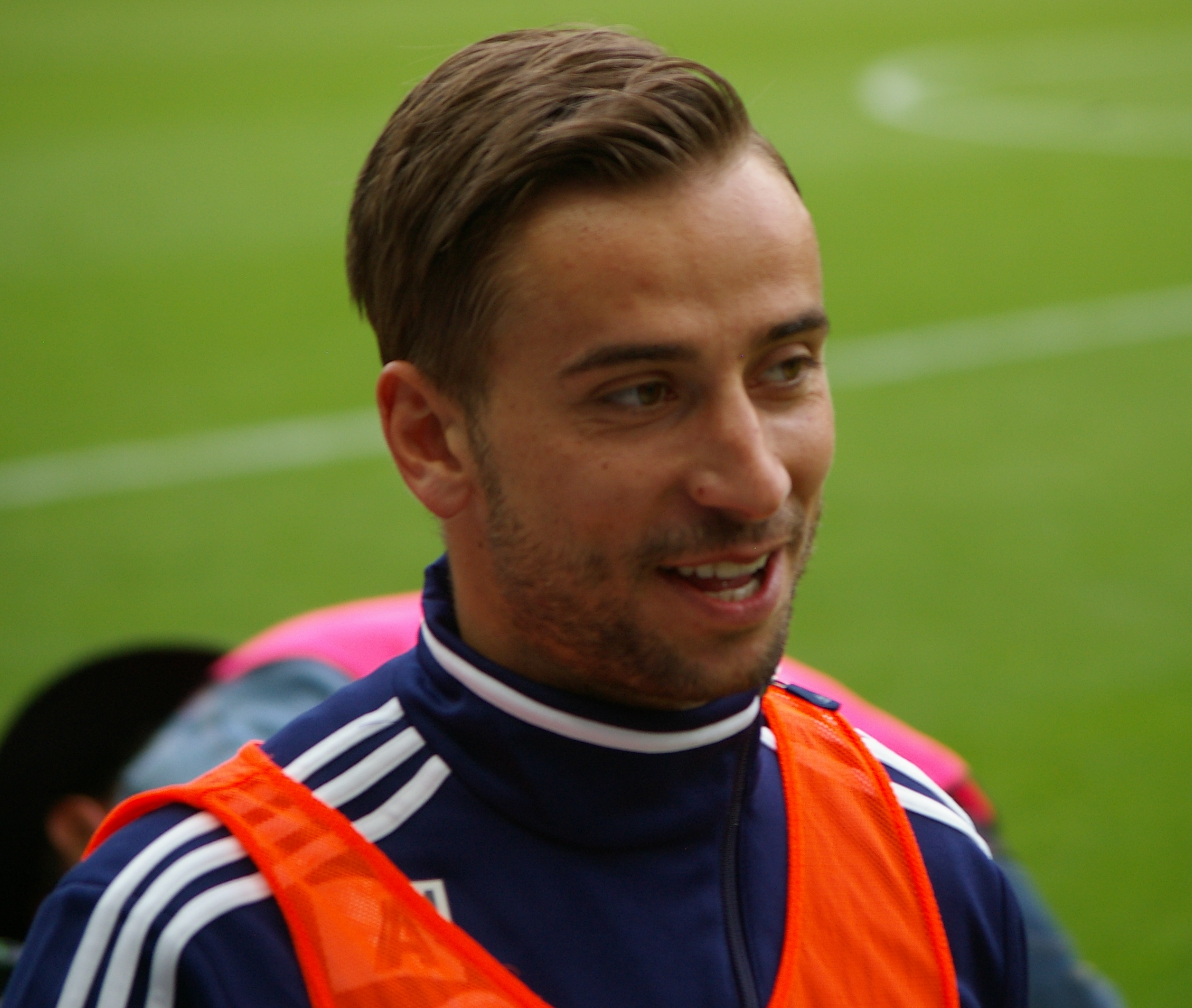
- Švento in 2013

Personal information
- Full name: Dušan Švento
- Date of birth: 1 August 1985 (age 41)
- Place of birth: Ružomberok, Czechoslovakia
- Height: 1.78 m (5 ft 10 in)
- Positions: Left winger; left-back

Youth career
- 1995–2003: Ružomberok

Senior career*
Years	Team	Apps	(Gls)
2003–2005	Ružomberok	38	(2)
2005–2009	Slavia Prague	82	(6)
2009–2014	Red Bull Salzburg	128	(13)
2014–2016	1. FC Köln	26	(1)
2016–2017	Slavia Prague	14	(0)
Total		288	(22)

International career
2006	Slovakia U21	2	(0)
2006–2016	Slovakia	47	(1)
- * Club domestic league appearances and goals

Dušan Švento (born 1 August 1985) is a Slovak former professional football midfielder who played as a left winger or left-back. He spent most of his career with Slavia Prague and Red Bull Salzburg while representing Slovakia.

== Club career ==
In summer 2007, Švento went to an English club Derby County for a trial and to take a look at the club's facilities. More English based clubs were interested. However, this interest ended as he damaged his knee ligaments after returning to Prague. He underwent surgery and was out for almost a year.

After suffering from an injury in 2005, Švento started in a play-off match of the 25th round of the Czech First League against Brno FC.

On 16 June 2009, Švento joined Red Bull Salzburg after signing a three-year contract for a transfer fee of €2 million.

In June 2016, he returned to Slavia Prague.

Švento rejoined Red Bull Salzburg in early February 2019, undertaking the role of U12 manager rather than becoming a regular player.

== International career ==
On 15 August 2006, Švento debuted for the Slovak senior squad in a friendly match against Malta under coach Dušan Galis. He scored his first goal in the national team in 5-1 away victory against Wales on 7 October 2006.
