= 2011–12 FK Austria Wien season =

Austria Wien
2011–12 season
- Manager: Karl Daxbacher
- Austrian Football Bundesliga: 4th
- ÖFB-Cup: Semi-finals
- UEFA Europa League: Group stage

The 2011–12 season of Austria Wien was the 100th season in the club's history. The season for Austria Wien started on 14 July 2011 with a UEFA Europa League qualifying match against Rudar Pljevlja.

== Review and events ==
Austria Wien started their season with a 3–0 win in the UEFA Europa League 2nd Qualifying Round on 14 July 2011 against Rudar Pljevlja from Montenegro. They started their domestic season with a 2–0 loss to Red Bull Salzburg in Salzburg after giving up 2 goals within a 2-minute period. Austria Wien advanced to the Group Stage of the UEFA Europa League after defeating Gaz Metan by a 3–2 aggregate scoreline. Austria Wien started the Group Stage with a 2–1 loss to Metalist Kharkiv.

== Competitions ==
=== Legend ===
Win Draw Loss

=== Austrian Football Bundesliga ===
17-07-2011 1	Red Bull Salzburg	2–0	Austria Wien	Salzburg
16:00 CET	Jantscher 64'; Alan 66'	Match Report		Stadium: Red Bull Arena; Attendance: 12,078; Referee: Manuel Schüttengruber

24-07-2011 2	Austria Wien	2–1	SV Ried	Vienna
18:30 CET	Hlinka 20'; Suttner 91'	Match Report	85' Nacho	Stadium: Franz Horr Stadium; Attendance: 6,851; Referee: Bernhard Brugger

31-07-2011 3	Wacker Innsbruck	0–0	Austria Wien	Innsbruck
16:00 CET		Match Report		Stadium: Tivoli-Neu; Attendance: 8,040; Referee: Manuel Schüttengruber

13-08-2011 4	Austria Wien	5–0	Kapfenberger SV	Vienna
18:30 CET	Jun 37'; Linz 42', 67' (pen.), 74', 92'	Match Report		Stadium: Franz Horr Stadium; Attendance: 6,684; Referee: Mag. Markus Katona

21-08-2011 5	Rapid Wien	0–3	Austria Wien	Vienna
16:00 CET		Match Report	15' Nacer Barazite; 52' Junuzović; 66' Linz	Stadium: Ernst Happel Stadium; Attendance: 20,511; Referee: Gerhard Grobelnik

28-08-2011 6	Austria Wien	2–4	Admira Wacker Mödling	Vienna
18:30 CET	Gorgon 26'; Junuzović 80'	Match Report	40', 52', 64' Hosiner; 90' Toth	Stadium: Franz Horr Stadium; Attendance: 7,727; Referee: Alexander Harkam

11-09-2011 7	SC Wiener Neustadt	1–1	Austria Wien	Wiener Neustadt
16:00 CET	Madl 37'	Match Report	11' Linz	Stadium: Stadion Wiener Neustadt; Attendance: 4,000; Referee: Oliver Drachta

18-09-2011 8	SV Mattersburg	2–4	Austria Wien	Mattersburg
18:30 CET	Seidl 54'; Bürger 76'	Match Report	12' Barazite; 56', 80' Grünwald; 90' Tadić	Stadium: Pappelstadion; Attendance: 6,168; Referee: Thomas Einwaller

24-09-2011 9	Austria Wien	2–1	Sturm Graz	Vienna
18:30 CET	Barazite 80'; Liendl 84'	Match Report	11' Bodul	Stadium: Franz Horr Stadium; Attendance: 8,418; Referee: Manuel Schüttengruber

02-10-2011 10	Austria Wien	3–2	Red Bull Salzburg	Vienna
16:00 CET	Junuzović 40'; Barazite 55'; Grünwald 90'	Match Report	45' Jantscher; 63' Teigl	Stadium: Franz Horr Stadium; Attendance: 9,745; Referee: Thomas Gangl

15-10-2011 11	SV Ried	2–1	Austria Wien	Ried im Innkreis
18:30 CET	Junuzović 14'	Match Report	16' Rodríguez Ortiz; 69' Hadžić	Stadium: Keine Sorgen Arena; Attendance: 5,022; Referee: Christian Dintar

23-10-2011 12	Austria Wien	1–1	Rapid Wien	Vienna
16:00 CET	Jun 37'	Match Report	45' Burgstaller	Stadium: Franz Horr Stadium; Attendance: 12,049; Referee: Robert Schörgenhofer

30-10-2011 13	Kapfenberger SV	2–2	Austria Wien	Kapfenberg
16:00 CET	Linz 45'; Barazite 69'	Match Report	8' Elsneg; 77' Ordoš	Stadium: Franz Fekete Stadium; Attendance: 3,554; Referee: Markus Hameter

06-11-2011 14	Austria Wien	2–2	Wacker Innsbruck	Vienna
18:30 CET	Liendl 54'; Junuzovic 90'	Match Report	14' Hackmair; 30' Schütz	Stadium: Franz Horr Stadium; Attendance: 7.794; Referee: Dominik Ouschan

19-11-2011 15	Admira Wacker Mödling	0–3	Austria Wien	Maria Enzersdorf
18:30 CET		Match Report	8' Barazite; 43' Margreitter; 65' Barazite	Stadium: Bundesstadion Südstadt; Attendance: 8,015; Referee: Oliver Drachta

26-11-2011 16	Austria Wien	2–2	SC Wiener Neustadt	Vienna
18:30 CET	Jun 49'; Barazite 52'	Match Report	37' Šimkovič; 90' Friesenbichler	Stadium: Franz Horr Stadium; Attendance: 7,402; Referee: Thomas Gangl

3-12-2011 18	Austria Wien	0–0	SV Mattersburg	Vienna
16:00 CET		Summary		Stadium: Franz Horr Stadium; Attendance: 8,100; Referee: Manuel Schüttengruber

10-12-2011 17	Sturm Graz	5–1	Austria Wien	Graz
16:00 CET	Bodul 30'; Bodul 88'; Kienast 47'; Kienast 58'; Kienast 71' (pen.)	Summary	Junuzović 43'	Stadium: UPC-Arena; Attendance: 10,531; Referee: Robert Schörgenhofer

18-12-2011 19	Red Bull Salzburg	3–0	Austria Wien	Salzburg
16:00 CET	Maierhofer 43'; Leonardo 66'; Maierhofer 90'	Summary		Stadium: Red Bull Arena; Attendance: 7,700; Referee: Oliver Drachta

11-02-2012 20	Austria Wien	2–0	SV Ried	Vienna
18:30 CET	Gorgon 9', 83'	Match Report		Stadium: Franz Horr Stadium; Attendance: 6,250; Referee: Alexander Harkam

18-02-2012 21	Rapid Wien	0–0	Austria Wien	Vienna
18:30 CET		Match Report		Stadium: Ernst Happel Stadium; Attendance: 29,400; Referee: Thomas Einwaller

25-02-2012 22	Austria Wien	0–1	Kapfenberger SV	Vienna
18:30 CET		Match Report	Júnior 45' (pen.)	Stadium: Franz Horr Stadium; Referee: Thomas Gangl

03-03-2012 23	Wacker Innsbruck	0–1	Austria Wien	Innsbruck
18:30 CET		Match Report	Gorgon 68'	Stadium: Tivoli-Neu; Attendance: 6,200; Referee: Oliver Drachta

10-03-2012 24	Austria Wien	2–1	Admira Wacker Mödling	Vienna
18:30 CET	Kienast 11'; Gorgon 47'	Summary	Toth 25'	Stadium: Franz Horr Stadium; Attendance: 8,000; Referee: Manuel Schüttengruber

17-03-2012 25	SC Wiener Neustadt	0–0	Austria Wien	Wiener Neustadt
18:30 CET	Besenlehner (yellow card) 26'; Friesenbichler (yellow card) 27'; Pollhammer (yellow card) 84'	Summary	Dilaver (yellow card) 46'; Leovac (yellow card) 51'; Lindner (yellow card) 55'; Jun (yellow card) 87'	Stadium: Stadion Wiener Neustadt; Attendance: 3,900; Referee: Dominik Ouschan

20-03-2012 26	SV Mattersburg	2–0	Austria Wien	Mattersburg
18:30 CET	Naumoski 16'; Seidl (yellow card) 53'; Mörz 74'	Summary	Margreitter (yellow card) 22' (yellow-red card) 69'; Simkovic (yellow card) 67'	Stadium: Pappelstadion; Attendance: 6,007; Referee: Robert Schörgenhofer

24-03-2012 27	Austria Wien	1–1	Sturm Graz	Vienna
18:30 CET	Linz 89'	Summary	Feldhofer (yellow card) 53'; Popkhadze (yellow card) 90'; Weber 90+4'	Stadium: Franz Horr Stadium; Attendance: 9,000; Referee: Thomas Gangl

1-04-2012 28	Austria Wien	1–1	Red Bull Salzburg	Vienna
16:00 CET	Jun 33'; Linz (yellow card) 84'	Summary	Mendes da Silva (yellow card) 51'; Maierhofer (yellow card) 89'; Leonardo 90+1'	Stadium: Franz Horr Stadium; Attendance: 10,000; Referee: (Switzerland) Alain Bieri

07-04-2012 29	SV Ried	0–1	Austria Wien	Ried im Innkreis
18:30 CET	Ziegl (yellow card) 80'; Schreiner (yellow card) 85'	Summary	Rogulj (yellow card) 5'; Klein (yellow card) 31'; Holland (yellow card) 63'; Linz 78'; Leovac (yellow card) 90+3'	Stadium: Keine Sorgen Arena; Attendance: 4,700; Referee: Rene Eisner

15-04-2012 30	Austria Wien	0–0	Rapid Wien	Vienna
16:00 CET	Dilaver (yellow card) 42'; Gorgon (yellow card) 74'	Summary	Drazan (yellow card) 25'; Lukas Grozurek (yellow card) 90'	Stadium: Franz Horr Stadium; Attendance: 10,791; Referee: Harald Lechner

21-04-2012 31	Kapfenberger SV	1–0	Austria Wien	Kapfenberg
18:30 CET	Nathan Júnior (yellow card) 5'; Hanek (yellow card) 44'; Kuljić 90+1' (pen.)	Summary	Šimkovič (yellow card) 45'; Ortlechner (yellow card) 48' (yellow-red card) 89'	Stadium: Franz Fekete Stadium; Attendance: 2,017; Referee: Markus Hameter

28-04-2012 32	Austria Wien	3–0	Wacker Innsbruck	Vienna
16:00 CET	Gorgon 52'; Dilaver (yellow card) 56'; Kienast 68'; Šimkovič 90'	Summary	Kofler (yellow card) 31'; Wernitznig (yellow card) 75'	Stadium: Franz Horr Stadium; Attendance: 7,950; Referee: Robert Schörgenhofer

05-05-2012 33	Admira Wacker Mödling	3–2	Austria Wien	Maria Enzersdorf
18:30 CET	Ouédraogo 15'; Margreitter 23' (o.g.); Sulimani (yellow card) 58'; Ježek 61'; Tischler (yellow card) 90+1'	Report	Suttner (yellow card) 29'; Dilaver (yellow card) 56'; Linz 69'; Michael Liendl 70'; Gorgon (yellow card) 87'	Stadium: Bundesstadion Südstadt; Attendance: 7,452; Referee: Oliver Drachta

10-05-2012 34	Austria Wien	3–1	SC Wiener Neustadt	Vienna
18:30 CET	Liendl 9'; Linz 37'; Stanković 45+1'; Leovac (yellow card) 71'	Report	Friesenbichler 42'; Reiter (yellow card) 58'	Stadium: Franz Horr Stadium; Attendance: 7,035; Referee: Manfred Krassnitzer

13-05-2012 35	Austria Wien	1–0	SV Mattersburg	Vienna
18:30 CET	Šimkovič 62'	Report	Parlov (yellow card) 6'; Naumoski (yellow card) 18'	Stadium: Franz Horr Stadium; Attendance: 7,082; Referee: Thomas Einwaller

17-05-2012 36	Sturm Graz	3–1	Austria Wien	Graz
16:00 CET	Bodul 67'; Kainz (yellow card) 76'; Lindner 86' (o.g.); Ehrenreich 90+2'	Report	Linz 21' (yellow card) 88'; Leovac (yellow card) 73' (yellow-red card) 89'; Stanković (yellow card) 74'; Suttner (yellow card) 77'	Stadium: UPC-Arena; Attendance: 14,251; Referee: Oliver Drachta

==== League table ====
Pos	Team	Pld	W	D	L	GF	GA	GD	Pts	Qualification or relegation
2	Rapid Wien	36	16	14	6	52	30	+22	62	Qualification to Europa League third qualifying round (Note: Since 2011–12 Austrian Cup winners Red Bull Salzburg qualified for the 2012–13 UEFA Champions League, so cup runners-up Ried qualified for the 2012–13 UEFA Europa League second qualifying round. Moreover, Rapid Wien were moved up a round as the cup winner spot was not used.)
3	Admira Wacker Mödling	36	15	10	11	59	52	+7	55	Qualification to Europa League second qualifying round
4	Austria Wien	36	14	12	10	52	44	+8	54	
5	Sturm Graz	36	12	15	9	47	41	+6	51	
6	Ried	36	11	15	10	44	38	+6	48	Qualification to Europa League second qualifying round

Source: weltfussball.de (in German)
Rules for classification: 1) points; 2) goal difference; 3) number of goals scored.

=== ÖFB-Samsung-Cup ===
07-08-2011 1st Round	Admira Wacker Mödling Amateur	1–3	Austria Wien	Maria Enzersdorf
18:00 CET	Krenn 16'	Match Report	Margreitter 33'; Linz 64'; Jun 76'	Stadium: Bundesstadion Südstadt; Attendance: 1,500; Referee: Paul Petho

21-09-2011 2nd Round	USV Allerheiligen	1–3	Austria Wien	Allerheiligen bei Wildon
19:00 CET	Kulnik 31'	Match Report	Tadić 34', 60'; Junuzović 84'	Stadium: Sportplatz Usv Allerheiligen; Attendance: 1,234; Referee: Manfred Krassnitzer

26-10-2011 Round of 16	SVG Reichenau	0–2	Austria Wien	Innsbruck
10:30 CET		Match Report	Liendl 78'; Linz 80'	Stadium: Sportplatz Reichenau; Attendance: 800; Referee: Manuel Schüttengruber

9-4-2012 Quarter-Finals	Austria Lustenau	v	Austria Wien	Lustenau
CET				Stadium: Reichshofstadion

=== UEFA Europa League ===
==== Qualifying rounds ====
14–07–2011 2nd QR	Rudar Pljevlja (Montenegro)	0–3	Austria Wien	Pljevlja, Montenegro
18:00 CET		Match Report	35', 63' Barazite; 76' Jun	Stadium: Gradski stadion Attendance: 1,150; Referee: Mauro Bergonzi

21-07-2011 2nd QR	Austria Wien	2–0 (5–0 agg.)	(Montenegro) Rudar Pljevlja	Vienna, Austria
21:05 CET	Barazite 44'; Jun 75'	Match Report		Stadium: Franz Horr Stadium; Attendance: 5,100; Referee: Olivier Thual

28-07-2011 3rd QR	Olimpija Ljubljana (Slovenia)	1–1	Austria Wien	Ljubljana, Slovenia
19:00 CET	Vršič 60'	Match Report	33' Linz	Stadium: Stožice Stadium; Attendance: 7,350; Referee: Stanislav Todorov

04-08-2011 3rd QR	Austria Wien	3–2 (4–3 agg.)	(Slovenia) Olimpija Ljubljana	Vienna, Austria
21:05 CET	Barazite 18', 46', 69' (pen.)	Mstch Report	54' Vršič; 59' Jović	Stadium: Franz Horr Stadium; Attendance: 7,688; Referee: Aleksei Eskov

==== Play-off Round ====
18-08-2011 1st Leg	Austria Wien	3–1	(Romania) Gaz Metan	Vienna, Austria
19:00 CET	Linz 7'; Barazite 45', 61'	Match Report	24' Breeveld	Stadium: Franz Horr Stadium; Attendance: 9,100; Referee: Aleksei Kulbakov

25-08-2011 2nd Leg	Gaz Metan (Romania)	1–0 (2–3 agg.)	Austria Wien	Cluj-Napoca, Romania
19:00 CET	Hoban 40'	Match Report		Stadium: Stadionul Dr. Constantin Rădulescu; Attendance: 3,700; Referee: Hüseyin Göçek

==== Group stage ====
Pos	Team	Pld	W	D	L	GF	GA	GD	Pts	Qualification	MK	AZ	AW	MFF
1	(Ukraine) Metalist Kharkiv	6	4	2	0	15	6	+9	14	Advance to knockout phase	—	1–1	4–1	3–1
2	(Netherlands) AZ	6	1	5	0	10	7	+3	8 (Note: Tied on head-to-head results. Overall goal difference was used as the tiebreaker.)	Advance to knockout phase	1–1	—	2–2	4–1
3	Austria Wien	6	2	2	2	10	11	−1	8		1–2	2–2	—	2–0
4	(Sweden) Malmö FF	6	0	1	5	4	15	−11	1		1–4	0–0	1–2	—

Source: Soccerway
Notes:

15–09–2011 1	Austria Wien	1–2	(Ukraine) Metalist Kharkiv	Vienna, Austria
21:05 CET	Jun 7'	Match Report	56' Gueye; 79' (pen.) Xavier	Stadium: Franz Horr Stadium; Attendance: 9,920; Referee: Michael Dean (England)

29–09–2011 2	Malmö FF (Sweden)	1–2	Austria Wien	Malmö, Sweden
19:00 CET	Ranégie 82'	Match Report	17' Barazite; 36' Grünwald	Stadium: Malmö Stadion; Attendance: 22,000; Referee: Pawel Gil (Poland)

20–10–2011 3	AZ (Netherlands)	2–2	Austria Wien	Alkmaar, Netherlands
19:00 CET	Hlinka 80' (o.g.); Wernbloom 83'	Match Report	19' (o.g.) Marcellis; 29' Gorgon	Stadium: AFAS Stadion; Attendance: 16,500; Referee: Alexandru Tudor (Romania)

03–11–2011 4	Austria Wien	2–2	(Netherlands) AZ	Vienna, Austria
21:05 CET	Ortlechner 58'; Barazite 61'	Match Report	19' (pen.) Elm; 44' Wernbloom	Stadium: Franz Horr Stadium; Attendance: 10,200; Referee: Tony Chapron (France)

30–11–2011 5	Metalist Kharkiv (Ukraine)	4–1	Austria Wien	Kharkiv, Ukraine
19:00 CET	Devych 16'; Edmar 40'; Gueye 60'; Sosa 90'	Report	Mader 19'	Stadium: Metalist Stadium; Attendance: 25,810; Referee: Cristian Balaj (Romania)

15–12–2011 6	Austria Wien	2–0	(Sweden) Malmö FF	Vienna, Austria
21:05 CET	Liendl 62'; Barazite 80'	Report		Stadium: Franz Horr Stadium; Attendance: 10,000; Referee: Antti Munukka (Finland)

== Players ==
=== Transfers ===
In		Out	
Player	Transferred from	Player	Transferred to
Günther Arnberger		Robert Almer	Fortuna Düsseldorf
Alexander Grünwald	SC Wiener Neustadt	Julian Baumgartlinger	1. FSV Mainz 05
Pascal Grünwald	Wacker Innsbruck	Niklas Hoheneder	Karlsruher SC
Florian Mader	SV Ried	Szabolcs Safar	Wacker Innsbruck
Remo Mally		Fernando Troyansky	SC Wiener Neustadt
Kaja Rogulj		Petr Voříšek	Rheindorf Altach
		Andreas Tiffner	First Vienna FC
		Schumacher	Volyn Lutsk

=== Roster and statistics ===
As of 3 November 2011

No.	Pos	Nat	Player	Total		Bundesliga		ÖFB-Cup		Europa League	
No.	Pos	Nat	Player	Apps	Goals	Apps	Goals	Apps	Goals	Apps	Goals
1	GK	(Austria) AUT	Pascal Grünwald	22	0	13	0	0	0	9	0
13	GK	(Austria) AUT	Heinz Lindner	29	0	23	0	3	0	3	0
21	GK	(Austria) AUT	Günter Arnberger	0	0	0	0	0	0	0	0
26	GK	(Austria) AUT	Ivan Kardum	0	0	0	0	0	0	0	0
45	GK	(Austria) AUT	Manuel Kalman	0	0	0	0	0	0	0	0
46	GK	(Austria) AUT	Stefan Krell	0	0	0	0	0	0	0	0
3	DF	(Austria) AUT	Georg Margreitter	39	2	29	1	2	1	8	0
4	DF	(Croatia) CRO	Kaja Rogulj	16	0	8	0	2	0	6	0
5	DF	(Austria) AUT	Manuel Wallner	6	0	3	0	1	0	2	0
14	DF	(Austria) AUT	Manuel Ortlechner	42	1	31	0	2	0	9	1
22	DF	(Austria) AUT	Marin Leovac	22	0	17	0	2	0	3	0
24	DF	(Austria) AUT	Remo Mally	1	0	1	0	0	0	0	0
29	DF	(Austria) AUT	Markus Suttner	42	1	30	1	2	0	10	0
30	DF	(Austria) AUT	Fabian Koch	7	0	1	0	3	0	3	0
36	DF	(Austria) AUT	Phillipp Koblischek	0	0	0	0	0	0	0	0
43	DF	(Austria) AUT	Balakiyem Takougnadi	0	0	0	0	0	0	0	0
44	DF	(Austria) AUT	Miodrag Vukajlović	0	0	0	0	0	0	0	0
6	MF	(Slovakia) SVK	Peter Hlinka	18	1	8	1	2	0	8	0
7	MF	(Austria) AUT	Florian Klein	45	0	34	0	1	0	10	0
8	MF	(Austria) AUT	Patrick Salomon	0	0	0	0	0	0	0	0
10	MF	(Austria) AUT	Alexander Grünwald	31	3	22	3	2	0	7	0
16	MF	(Austria) AUT	Zlatko Junuzović	26	6	14	5	2	1	10	0
17	MF	(Austria) AUT	Florian Mader	32	1	25	0	2	0	5	1
18	MF	(Austria) AUT	Michael Liendl	37	5	32	4	2	1	3	0
20	MF	(Austria) AUT	Alexander Gorgon	38	7	31	6	0	0	7	1
25	MF	(Austria) AUT	James Holland	11	0	11	0				
27	MF	(Austria) AUT	Emir Dilaver	22	0	19	0	2	0	1	0
38	MF	(Slovakia) SVK	Tomáš Šimkovič	13	2	13	2				
9	FW	(Austria) AUT	Roland Linz	39	16	28	12	2	2	9	2
11	FW	(Czech Republic) CZE	Tomáš Jun	41	8	32	4	1	1	8	3
19	FW	(Austria) AUT	Marko Stanković	30	1	21	1	3	0	6	0
28	FW	(Austria) AUT	Dario Tadić	18	3	13	1	2	2	3	0
39	FW	(Netherlands) NED	Nacer Barazite	25	14	13	5	3	0	9	9
42	FW	(Netherlands) NED	Roman Kienast	13	2	13	2				
