= 2012–13 FK Austria Wien season =

Austria Wien
2012–13 season
- Chairman: Wolfgang Katzian
- Manager: Peter Stöger
- Stadium: Generali Arena, Vienna, Austria
- Bundesliga: 1st (champions)
- Austrian Cup: Runners-up
- Top goalscorer: League: Philipp Hosiner (27); All: Philipp Hosiner (30)
- Highest home attendance: 10,370 (vs. Rapid Wien)
- Lowest home attendance: 7,340 (vs. Wacker Innsbruck
- Average home league attendance: 8,409

The 2012–13 FK Austria Wien season was the 101 season in club history.

== Review and events ==
Austria Wien's Board of Directors met on 21 May 2012 to discuss Ivica Vastić future as manager and decided to sack him. The Board of Directors decided that Franco Foda is their first choice to replace Vastić and offered Foda the position. However, Foda turned down Austria Wien's offer and accepted the position from 1. FC Kaiserslautern. On 30 May 2012, Peter Stöger became the new manager of the club. Preseason training started on 11 June 2012.

The club opened their season with a win in the Austrian Cup. Their opening fixture of the Bundesliga season was scheduled for 21 July 2012. The match was rescheduled for the following Wednesday.

== Fixtures and results ==
=== Legend ===
Win Draw Loss

=== Bundesliga ===
==== League results and fixtures ====
No.	Date	Time	Opponent	Venue	Result F–A	Attendance	Goalscorers		League position	Source
No.	Date	Time	Opponent	Venue	Result F–A	Attendance	Austria Wien	Opponent	League position	Source
1	25 July 2012	18:30	Wolfsberg	A	1–0	6,706	Jun 77'	—	5th	
2	28 July 2012	18:30	Sturm Graz	H	0–1	8,812	—	Okotie 25'	6th	
3	5 August 2012	16:00	Rapid Wien	A	3–0	17,024	Kienast 38', 52'; Šimkovič 83'	—	4th	
4	12 August 2012	18:30	Admira Wacker Mödling	H	1–0	8,068	Stanković 61'	—	2nd	
5	18 August 2012	16:00	SV Ried	A	1–0	4,457	Grünwald 84'	—	2nd	
6	25 August 2012	18:30	Wacker Innsbruck	H	2–0	7,340	Švejnoha 18' (o.g.); Jun 58'	—	1st	
7	1 September 2012	18:30	SC Wiener Neustadt	A	2–0	3,250	Suttner 26'; Šimkovič 83'	—	1st	
8	16 September 2012	16:00	SV Mattersburg	A	4–2	9,978	Hosiner 5', 70'; Rogulj 53'; Gorgon 90'	Potzmann 2'; Naumoski 44'	1st	
9	22 September 2012	18:30	Red Bull Salzburg	H	0–1	9,665	—	Berisha 86'		
10	29 September 2012	16:00	Wolfsberg	H	1–1	8,704	Jun 84'	Topčagić 71'		
11	7 October	16:00	Sturm Graz	A	1–1	13,364	Hosiner 7'	Kainz 15' (pen.)		
12	21 October	16:00	Rapid Wien	H	2–0	10,370	Gorgon 29', 52'	—		
13	27 October	18:30	Admira Wacker Mödling	A	6–4	4,950	Hosiner 2', 90', 90+3'; Šimkovič 29'; Rogulj 51'; Gorgon 60'	Schick 25'; Schachner 32'; Thürauer 45+1'; Schwab 82' (pen.)		
14	4 November	16:00	SV Ried	H	6–1	7,110	Hosiner 11', 52', 70'; Jun 18'; Stanković 82'; Linz 87'	Žulj 57'		
15	10 November	18:30	Wacker Innsbruck	A	3–0	6,309	Mader 49'; Jun 69'; Hosiner 82'	—		
16	17 November	16:00	SC Wiener Neustadt	H	3–0	8,379	Ortlechner 22'; Kienast 65'; Grünwald 68'	—		
17	24 November	18:30	SV Mattersburg	H	3–1	7,231	Hosiner 16', 73'; Gorgon 72'	Rodler 38'		
18	2 December	16:00	Red Bull Salzburg	A	0–0	16,057	—	—		
19	8 December	18:30	Wolfsberg	A	6–3	2,475	Hosiner 8', 33', 70'; Koch 65'; Gorgon 72'; Dilaver 90+1'	Falk 19' de Paula 40'; Jacobo 56'		
20	16 December	16:00	Sturm Graz	H	3–1	11,120	Hosiner 49'; Suttner 66'; Stanković 89'	Okotie 55'		
21	17 February	16:00	Rapid Wien	A	2–1	17,000	Hosiner 27', 54'	Trimmel 20'		
22	23 February 2013	18:30	Admira Wacker Mödling	H	4–0					
23	27 February 2013		SV Ried	A	3–1					
24	2 March 2013		Wacker Innsbruck	H	4–0					
25	9 March 2013		SC Wiener Neustadt	A	0–0					
26	17 March 2013		SV Mattersburg	A	4–0					
27	31 March 2013		Red Bull Salzburg	H	1–1					
28	6 April 2013		Wolfsberg	H	0–4					
29	14 April 2013		Sturm Graz	A	1–1					
30	21 April 2013		Rapid Wien	H	2–2					
31	28 April 2013		Admira Wacker Mödling	A	2–0					
32	4 May 2013		SV Ried	H	3–1					
33	11 May 2013		Wacker Innsbruck	A	3–0					
34	18 May 2013		SC Wiener Neustadt	H	3–1					
35	22 May 2013		SV Mattersburg	H	4–0					
36	26 May 2013		Red Bull Salzburg	A	0–3					

==== League table ====
Pos	Team	Pld	W	D	L	GF	GA	GD	Pts	Qualification or relegation
1	Austria Wien (C)	36	25	7	4	84	31	+53	82	Qualification for the Champions League third qualifying round
2	Red Bull Salzburg	36	22	11	3	91	39	+52	77	Qualification for the Champions League third qualifying round
3	Rapid Wien	36	16	9	11	57	39	+18	57	Qualification for the Europa League third qualifying round
4	Sturm Graz	36	13	9	14	49	56	−7	48	Qualification for the Europa League second qualifying round
5	Wolfsberger AC	36	12	11	13	53	56	−3	47	

Source: weltfussball.de (in German)
Rules for classification: 1) points; 2) goal difference; 3) number of goals scored.
(C) Champions

==== Result summary ====
Overall								Home						Away					
Pld	W	D	L	GF	GA	GD	Pts	W	D	L	GF	GA	GD	W	D	L	GF	GA	GD
36	25	7	4	84	31	+53	82	12	3	3	42	15	+27	13	4	1	42	16	+26

Last updated: 8 May 2013.
Source: Bundesliga.at (Home) and Bundesliga.at (Away)

=== ÖFB-Cup ===
14 July 2012 1st Round	SV Oberwart	1–3	Austria Wien	Oberwart
18:00	Seper 87'	Match Report	45', 58' Jun; 60' Stanković	Stadium: Informstadion; Attendance: 2,100; Referee: A. Harkam

25 September 2012 2nd Round	FC Dornbirn	2–3	Austria Wien	Dornbirn
20:30	Schafer 3'; Honeck 68'	Match Report	Linz 18', 19'; Ortlechner 85'	Stadium: Stadion Birkenwiese; Attendance: 1,500; Referee: Walter Altmann

31 October 2012 Last 16	Villach	0–4	Austria Wien	Villach
19:00		Match Report	Thomas Pircker 35' (o.g.); Hosiner 69'; Kienast 75'; Jun 85'	Stadium: Stadion Villach-Lind; Attendance: 1,200; Referee: Rene Eisner

16 April 2013 Quarterfinal	Wolfsberger AC	v	Austria Wien	Wolfsberg
15:00				Stadium: Lavanttal-Arena

== Squad ==
=== Squad and statistics ===
As of 5 June 2013

No.	Pos	Nat	Player	Total		Bundesliga		ÖFB-Cup	
No.	Pos	Nat	Player	Apps	Goals	Apps	Goals	Apps	Goals
Goalkeepers
1	GK	(Austria) AUT	Pascal Grünwald	1	0	0	0	1	0
13	GK	(Austria) AUT	Heinz Lindner	37	0	36	0	1	0
21	GK	(Austria) AUT	Günter Arnberger	0	0	0	0	0	0
26	GK	(Croatia) CRO	Ivan Kardum	1	0	0	0	1	0
Defenders
4	DF	(Croatia) CRO	Kaja Rogulj	29	2	29	2	0	0
5	DF	(Austria) AUT	Lukas Rotpuller	11	0	9	0	2	0
14	DF	(Austria) AUT	Manuel Ortlechner	39	3	36	2	3	1
22	DF	(Austria) AUT	Marin Leovac	2	0	2	0	0	0
24	DF	(Austria) AUT	Remo Mally	0	0	0	0	0	0
29	DF	(Austria) AUT	Markus Suttner	38	3	35	3	3	0
30	DF	(Austria) AUT	Fabian Koch	23	2	21	2	2	0
36	DF	(Austria) AUT	Phillipp Koblischek	0	0	0	0	0	0
43	DF	(Austria) AUT	Balakiyem Takougnadi	0	0	0	0	0	0
44	DF	(Austria) AUT	Miodrag Vukajlović	0	0	0	0	0	0
Midfielders
7	MF	(Slovenia) SVN	Dare Vršič	19	0	17	0	2	0
8	MF	(Austria) AUT	Tomáš Šimkovič	30	3	28	3	2	0
10	MF	(Austria) AUT	Alexander Grünwald	28	7	26	7	2	0
17	MF	(Austria) AUT	Florian Mader	33	2	30	2	3	0
18	MF	(Austria) AUT	Thomas Murg	7	0	7	0	0	0
20	MF	(Austria) AUT	Alexander Gorgon	33	10	31	10	2	0
20	MF	(Austria) AUT	Srđan Spiridonović	3	0	2	0	1	0
25	MF	(Australia) AUS	James Holland	36	0	34	0	2	0
27	MF	(Austria) AUT	Emir Dilaver	27	2	26	2	1	0
Forwards
9	FW	(Netherlands) NED	Nacer Barazite	5	1	5	1	0	0
11	FW	(Czech Republic) CZE	Tomáš Jun	35	13	33	10	2	3
15	FW	(Austria) AUT	Martin Harrer	0	0	0	0	0	0
16	FW	(Austria) AUT	Philipp Hosiner	32	28	30	27	2	1
19	FW	(Austria) AUT	Marko Stanković	29	4	26	3	3	1
42	FW	(Austria) AUT	Roman Kienast	32	8	29	7	3	1
No longer at the club
3	DF	(Austria) AUT	Georg Margreitter	4	0	3	0	1	0
9	FW	(Austria) AUT	Roland Linz	9	3	7	1	2	2

=== Transfers ===
==== Out ====
No.	Pos.	Nat.	Name	Age	EU	Moving to	Type	Transfer window	Transfer fee	Source
	DF	(Austria)	Florian Klein	24	EU	Red Bull Salzburg	Free	Summer		
	DF	(Austria)	Georg Margreitter	23	EU	Wolverhampton Wanderers (England)	Undisclosed	Summer		

== Notes ==
- 1. Austria Wien goals first.
