= 2011–12 Austrian Cup =

2011–12 Austrian FA Cup
Öfb Cup (German)
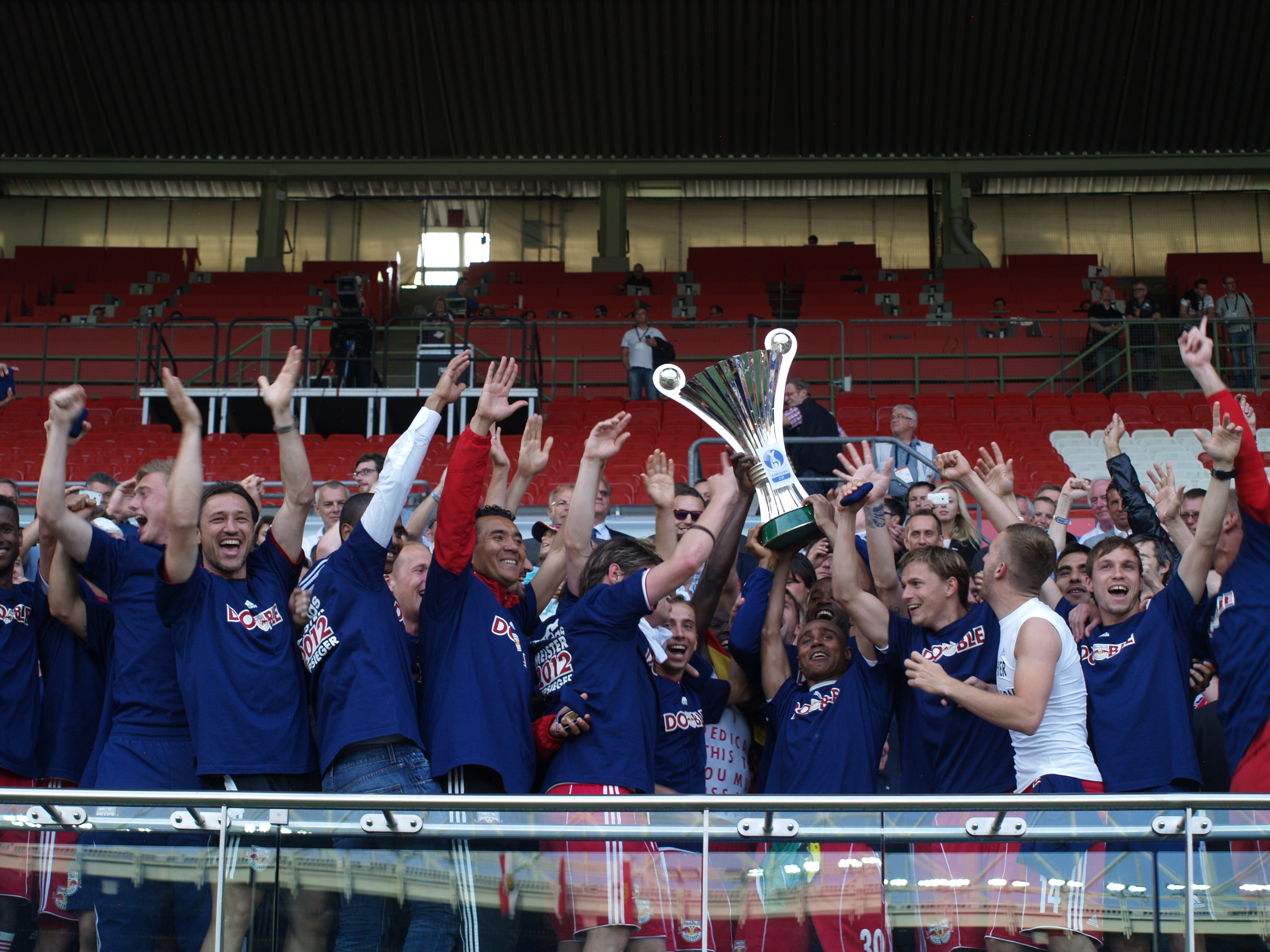
- Red Bull Salzburg celebrating

Tournament details
- Country: Austria
- Teams: 97

Final positions
- Champions: FC Red Bull Salzburg
- Runners-up: SV Ried

Tournament statistics
- Top goal scorer: Hamdi Salihi (8)

The 2011–12 Austrian Cup (German: ÖFB-Cup) was the 78th season of Austria's nationwide football cup competition. It commenced with the matches of the preliminary round in July 2011 and concluded with the final on 20 May 2012. The runner-up of the competition, defending champion SV Ried, qualified for the second qualifying round of the 2012–13 UEFA Europa League, as domestic champion FC Red Bull Salzburg gained their first double with a 3–0 victory in Ernst-Happel-Stadion.

== Participating teams ==
The teams the Bundesliga, the First League, the two losers of the First League Relegation Playoff and the winner of the 9 winner of the province cups.

The teams of the preliminary round were nominated by the 9 province-FAs.

First round
Austrian Bundesliga	First League	Regionalliga	Landesliga
Austria Wien; Admira; Kapfenberger SV; Mattersburg; Rapid Wien; Red Bull Salzburg; Ried; Sturm Graz; Wacker Innsbruck; Wiener Neustadt	SC Rheindorf Altach; SV Grödig; TSV Hartberg; FC Blau-Weiß Linz; LASK Linz; Austria Lustenau; FC Lustenau; WAC St. Andrä; SKN St. Pölten; First Vienna	WSG Wattens; Parndorf; Villacher SV^{CW} RB Salzburg B^{CW} FC Dornbirn^{CW}	SC Schwaz (Tyr)^{CW} SV Grieskirchen (UA)^{CW} SC Weiz (Sty)^{CW} SV St. Margarethen (Bgl)^{CW} FC Hellas Kagran (2.Vie)^{CW} SC Brunn am Gebirge (2.LA)^{CW}

Preliminary Round
Regionalliga East	Regionalliga Central	Regionalliga West	Landesliga		
Austria Wien B 1.Simmeringer SC; Wiener Sport-Club; Rapid B SV Schwechat; Admira B SV Horn; FAC; SKU Amstetten; 1.FC Sollenau; SC Ritzing^{q} SC Neusiedl am See 1919^{q} SV Stegersbach^{q}	FC Gratkorn; LASK Linz B GAK; SV Allerheiligen; FC Pasching; Union St. Florian; Austria Klagenfurt; Union Vöcklamarkt; SV Gleinstätten; DSV Leoben; SAK Klagenfurt; Sturm Graz B FC Wels; SK Vorwärts Steyr; SV Kapfenberg B	USK Anif; SV Austria Salzburg; FC Kufstein; Wacker Innsbruck B SC Bregenz; St.Johann; FC Hard; Altach B TSV Neumarkt; Union Innsbruck; SV Hall	Lower Austria; SC Retz^{b} ASC Götzendorf^{b} ASK Bad Vöslau^{b} FC Mistelbach^{b} SC Zwettl^{b} SKN St.Pölten B^{b} FC Schwadorf^{b} Vienna; ISS Admira^{b} Post SV^{b} Burgenland; ASK Baumgarten^{q} Klingenbach^{q} ASK Kohfidisch^{q} ASK Stinatz^{q}	Upper Austria; SV Sierning^{b} SV Ried B^{b} SV Bad Schallerbach^{b} Donau Linz^{b} Carinthia; ATSV Wolfsberg^{b} SK Treibach^{b} SVG Bleiburg; SG Nessl Drautal; Styria; ASK Voitsberg^{r} SV Frohnleiten^{b} FC Gleisdorf 09^{b}	Tyrol: SVG Reichenau^{r} SC Kundl^{b} Salzburg; SV Grödig B^{Note CR}

Notes:

(Salzburg (state)) Salzburg:SV Grödig B is qualified as Salzburg Cup runners-up

^{b} : Nominated as Best placed team(s) in Landesliga

^{r} : Relegated from Regionalliga

^{r} : Qualified as Burgenland preliminary winner

== Schedule ==
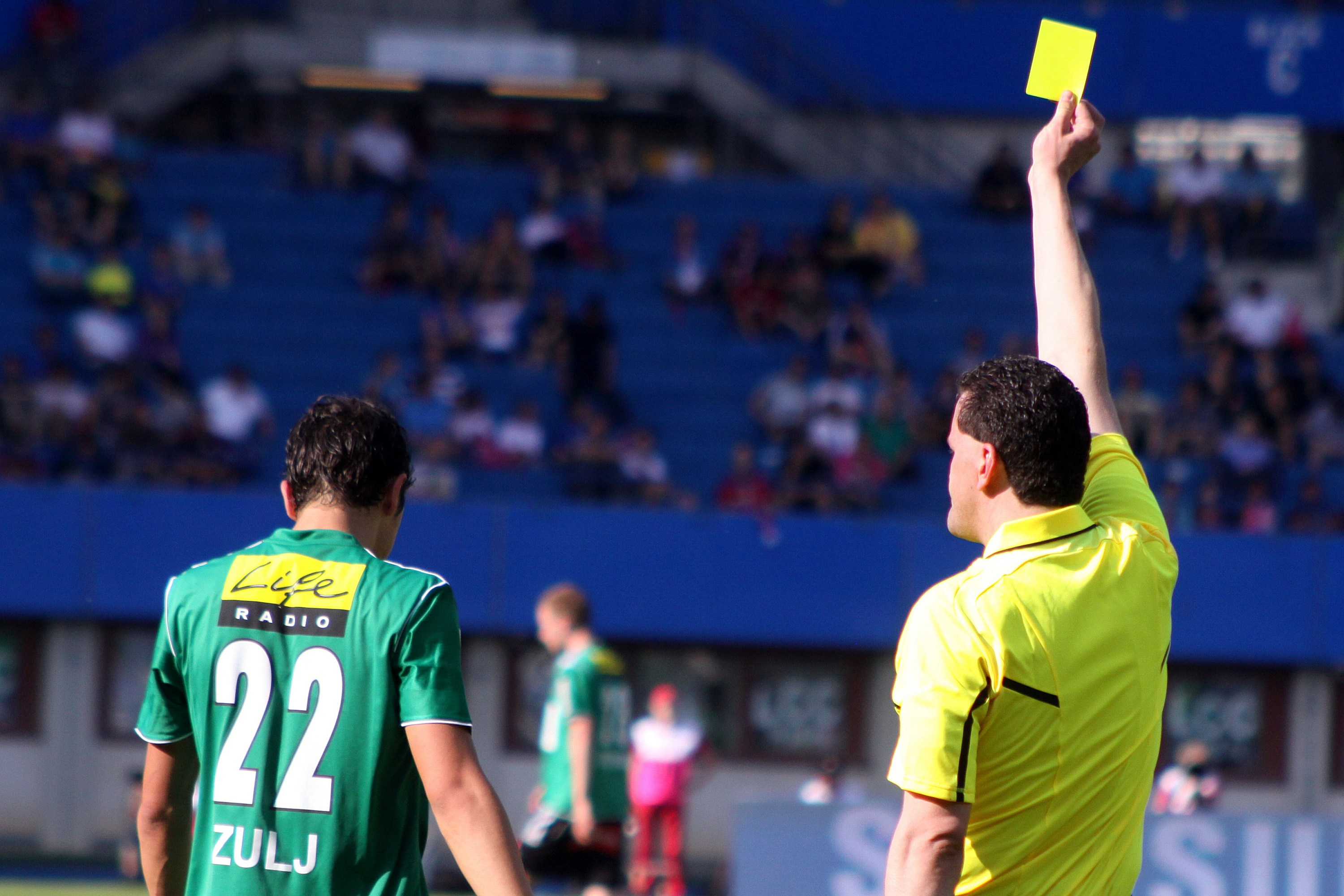

5–7 August 2011: 1st Round
20–21 September 2011: 2nd Round
25–26 October 2011: Round of 16
10–11 April 2012: Quarterfinals
1-2 Mai 2012: Semifinals
20 Mai 2012: Final

== Preliminary round ==
The Preliminary Round involved 66 amateur clubs from all regional federations, divided into smaller groups according to the Austrian federal states. The draw for this round was conducted in Vienna (Ernst Happel Stadion) on 6 July 2011.

Team 1	Score	Team 2
15 July 2011
Kapfenberg B	2–0	Voitsberg
18 July 2011
ATSV Wolfsberg	1–0	Bleiburg
22 July 2011
Sollenau	3–1	Mistelbach
Donau Linz	2–1	Bad Schallerbach
FAC	1–2	Post SV
FC Gratkorn	4–2	GAK
Austria Wien B	4–0	1.Simmeringer SC
Zwettel	0–4	Admira B
Sturm Graz B	5–1	Frohnleiten
Vorwärts Steyr	2–1	Sierning
Amstetten	2–0	Horn
Hall	0–2	Kundl
Schwechat	0–1	Rapid B
St.Johann	1–2	Neumarkt
Vöcklamarkt	4–0	Neuhof-I./SV Ried
Allerheiligen	2–0	Gleinstätten
Baumgarten	3–2	Klingenbach
Stegersbach	4–2	Kohfidisch
Götzendorf	4–1	Neusiedl
23 July 2011
Bad Vöslau	3–0	SKN St. Pölten Amateure
Drautal	3–6	Austria Klagenfurt
SAK Klagenfurt	3–0	Treibach
Admira Landhaus	1–4	Wiener SK
Retz	3–1	Schwadorf
Austria Salzburg	2–0	Anif
Grödig	2–1	Kufstein
Reichenau	5–1	Wacker Innsbruck B
Union Innsbruck	4–1	Rheindorf Altach B
Hard	2–3	Bregenz
Gleisdorf	1–3	Leoben
Union St. Florian	2–0 (a.e.t.)	Wels
Stinatz	2–2 (a.e.t.) (7–5 p)	Ritzing
24 July 2011
LASK Juniors	1–1 (a.e.t.) (6–5 p)	Pasching

== First round ==
The draw for this round was on 25 July 2011. The matches took place on 5 through 7 August 2011.

Team 1	Score	Team 2
5 August 2011
Wiener SK	1–2	Bad Vöslau
Allerheiligen	1–0	Vöcklamarkt
Dornbirn	4–0	Stegersbach
Post SV	0–3	Kapfenberger SV
Amstetten	4–1	Schwaz
Donau Linz	0–3	SV Grödig
Wolfsberg	1–2	WAC St. Andrä
DSV Leoben	2–3	FC Lustenau
Austria Wien B	4–0	First Vienna
Götzendorf	3–2	SKN St. Pölten
Rapid Wien B	1–0	Wiener Neustadt
Kundl	0–3	TSV Hartberg
Sturm Graz B	2–5 (a.e.t.)	LASK Linz
6 August 2011
Red Bull Salzburg B	5–0	SC Brunn am Gebirge
WSG Wattens	2–2 (a.e.t.) (3–5 p)	St.Margarethen
Union Innsbruck	3–2	Grieskirchen
SC Weiz	5–1	Neumarkt
Parndorf	3–0	Austria Salzburg
LASK Linz B	0–7	Rapid Wien
SAK Klagenfurt	3–1	Sollenau
Stinatz	1–3	FC Blau-Weiß Linz
SC Hellas Kagran	0–4	Wacker Innsbruck
SV Kapfenberg B	1–3	Mattersburg
SC Bregenz	0–2	Austria Lustenau
Vorwärts Steyr	1–6	Admira
SV Grödig B	0–4	Sturm Graz
Union St.Florian	2–0	SC Rheindorf Altach
7 August 2011
Gratkorn	0–3	Ried
Admira Wacker Mödling B	1–3	Austria Wien
Reichenau	0–0 (a.e.t.) (4–1 p)	Austria Klagenfurt
Villach	4–2	SC Retz
Baumgarten	0–3	Red Bull Salzburg

== Second round ==
The winners from the previous round compete in this stage of the competition. These matches were played on 20 and 21 September 2011.

Team 1	Score	Team 2
20 September 2011
Union Innsbruck	0–7	Austria Lustenau
Rapid Wien B	4–2	WAC St. Andrä
Austria Wien B	0–5	LASK Linz
Dornbirn	0–2	SV Grödig
Parndorf	0–1	Admira Wacker Mödling
Union St.Florian	0–2	FC Blau-Weiß Linz
Villach	1–2	TSV Hartberg
Götzendorf	2–3	Ried
Amstetten	2–4	FC Lustenau
21 September 2011
Red Bull Salzburg B	1–1 (a.e.t.) (6–5 p)	Mattersburg
Bad Vöslau	1–4	Rapid Wien
SAK Klagenfurt	0–4	Red Bull Salzburg
Reichenau	2–1	Kapfenberg
SC Weiz	0–4	Sturm Graz
Allerheiligen	1–3	Austria Wien
St.Margarethen	0–3	Wacker Innsbruck

== Third round ==
The winners from the previous round compete in this stage of the competition. These matches were played on 25 and 26 October 2011.

Team 1	Score	Team 2
'25 October 2011
Wacker Innsbruck	0−1	SV Grödig
Red Bull Salzburg B	3−1	FC Blau-Weiß Linz
Austria Lustenau	4−1	FC Lustenau
Rapid Wien	1−2 (a.e.t.)	SV Ried
'26 October 2011
Reichenau	0−2	Austria Wien
Red Bull Salzburg	2−1	LASK Linz
Sturm Graz	3−1	Admira Wacker Mödling
Rapid Wien B	0−2	TSV Hartberg

== Quarter-finals ==
The winners from the previous round compete in this stage of the competition. These matches were played on 10 and 11 April 2012.

10 April 2012	SV Grödig	2–3	SV Ried	Grödig
18:00	Diego Viana 30'; Schubert 42'	Report (in German)	Meilinger 11', 77'; Žulj 74'	Stadium: Untersberg-Arena; Attendance: 1,800; Referee: Dominik Ouschan

11 April 2012	SC Austria Lustenau	1–2	FK Austria Wien	Lustenau
18:00	Zwischenbrugger 65'	Report (in German)	Jun 8'; Ortlechner 45+1'	Stadium: Reichshofstadion; Attendance: 3,400; Referee: Dr. Thomas Prammer

11 April 2012	SK Sturm Graz	2–4 (a.e.t.)	TSV Hartberg	Graz
19:00	Kainz 45', 68'	Report (in German)	Prietl 34'; Rakowitz 45+1'; Mössner 112'; Ismaili 120'	Stadium: UPC-Arena; Attendance: 4,457; Referee: Dieter Muckenhammer

11 April 2012	FC Red Bull Salzburg	4–1	FC Red Bull Salzburg Juniors	Wals-Siezenheim
19:00	Soriano 44', 82'; Sekagya 74'; Teigl 77'	Report (in German)	Krenn 37'	Stadium: Red Bull Arena; Attendance: 1,440; Referee: Bernd Hirschbichler

== Semi-finals ==
The winners from the previous round compete in this stage of the competition. These matches were played on 1 and 2 May 2012.

1 May 2012	TSV Hartberg	0–1	FC Red Bull Salzburg	Hartberg
18:00		Report (in German)	Jantscher 80'	Stadium: Stadion Hartberg; Attendance: 3,700; Referee: Gerhard Grobelnik

2 May 2012	SV Ried	2–0	FK Austria Wien	Ried im Innkreis
20:30	Guillem 18', 73'	Report (in German)		Stadium: Keine Sorgen Arena; Referee: Alexander Harkam

== Final ==
20 May 2012
16:00

FC Red Bull Salzburg	3–0	SV Ried
Leonardo 10' (pen.); Schiemer 14'; Hierländer 90'	Report (in German)

Ernst-Happel-Stadion, Vienna
Attendance: 16,000
Referee: Thomas Einwaller
