= Roland Linz =

Austrian footballer (born 1981)

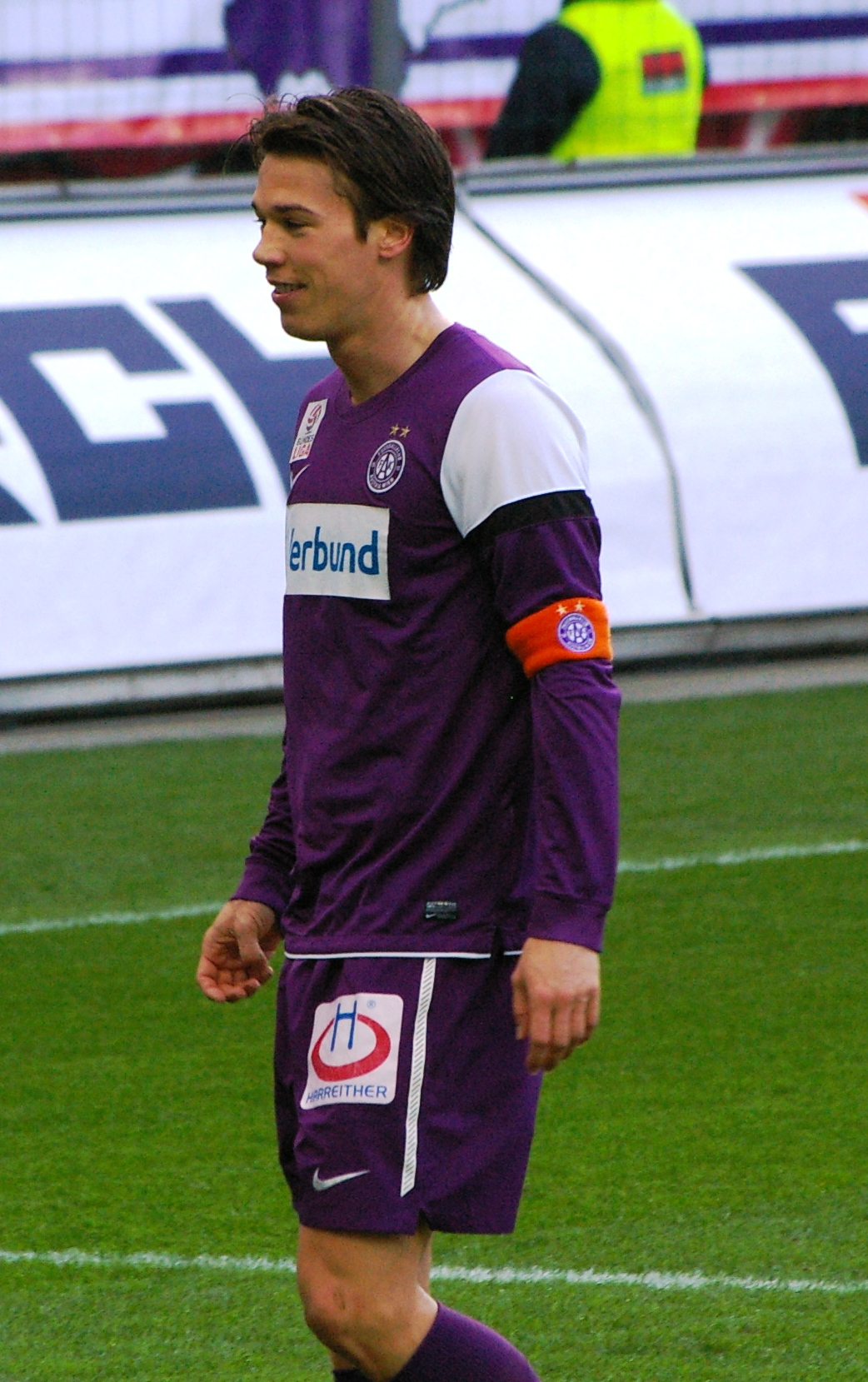
- Linz playing with Austria Wien in 2011

Personal information
- Full name: Roland Gunther Linz
- Date of birth: 9 August 1981 (age 45)
- Place of birth: Leoben, Austria
- Height: 1.85 m (6 ft 1 in)
- Position: Forward

Youth career
- 1995–1997: DSV Leoben
- 1997–1999: 1860 Munich

Senior career*
Years	Team	Apps	(Gls)
1999–2001	DSV Leoben	53	(27)
2001–2006	Austria Wien	81	(26)
2003–2004	→ Admira Mödling (loan)	31	(15)
2004	→ Nice (loan)	15	(0)
2005	→ Sturm Graz (loan)	13	(4)
2006–2007	Boavista	28	(10)
2007–2009	Braga	33	(11)
2009	→ Grasshoppers (loan)	16	(7)
2009–2010	Gaziantepspor	5	(0)
2010–2013	Austria Wien	86	(40)
2013–2014	Muangthong United	4	(1)
2014	Belenenses	3	(0)
Total		368	(141)

International career
2002–2010	Austria	39	(8)
- * Club domestic league appearances and goals

Roland Gunther Linz (born 9 August 1981) is an Austrian former professional footballer who played as a forward.

He spent most of his extensive professional career with Austria Wien, winning five major titles including three Austrian Bundesliga championships. He also competed in France, Portugal, Turkey and Thailand.

Linz earned 39 caps for Austria, appearing for the nation at Euro 2008.

== Club career ==
=== Early career and Germany ===
Born in Leoben, Styria, Linz started in the youth teams of local DSV Leoben. Aged 15, he left for Germany to finish his football development on Bavaria with TSV 1860 München.

Two years later, Linz returned to Austria to rejoin his hometown club, this time being featured in the professional squad. Over the two following seasons, he scored 27 goals in 53 games combined, and his good form in the second division attracted the attention of bigger sides in the country, which led to him signing with FK Austria Wien.

Linz had his first taste of success at his new team, winning both the Bundesliga and cup in the 2002–03 campaign. One year later, he moved on loan to VfB Admira Wacker Mödling, located in the southern outskirts of the capital.

=== Second move abroad and return ===
Linz left Austria for the second time in 2004, joining Ligue 1 club OGC Nice on loan. However, he failed to establish himself and returned home after just six months, to play for SK Sturm Graz until the end of the season.

Linz then returned to Austria Wien for a final campaign, which again ended with the double as the player was crowned league top scorer. It was around this time that he established himself in the national team, with two goals in a 2–3 defeat against Poland at the Silesian Stadium in Chorzów in the 2006 FIFA World Cup qualifiers.

=== Portugal and later years ===
After excellent performances for both club and country, interest in Linz's services increased, and he eventually joined Boavista F.C. during the 2006 summer, on a three-year contract. He finished his debut season with ten Primeira Liga goals, and subsequently moved to S.C. Braga.

In the 2007–08 UEFA Cup, Linz netted five goals before his team was eventually ousted by SV Werder Bremen, and added 11 in the league, relegating veteran goal-getter João Tomás to the bench as Braga finished seventh and again reached the UEFA Cup, through the UEFA Intertoto Cup.

After a run-in with manager Jorge Jesus, following a substitution during a 0–2 loss at Leixões S.C. in September 2008, Linz lost his importance in the Braga squad and, on 30 January 2009, signed for Grasshopper Club Zürich on loan until June. In his first competitive fixture for his new club, in the local derby against FC Zürich, he scored but was also sent off after two yellow cards, in the 39th and 41st minutes.

Linz joined Gaziantepspor during the 2009 summer on a three-year contract, moving alongside Braga teammate Jorginho. In January 2010, however, he returned to his country and Austria Vienna, scoring on his debut – a 4–3 home win against Kapfenberger SV – to make the Bundesliga Team of the Week.

In 2013, Linz switched teams and countries again, after agreeing to a transfer to Muangthong United F.C. in the Thai Premier League. He netted his first official goal on 30 March, contributing to a 3–0 win over Songkhla United FC.

== International career ==
Linz made his debut for Austria in a friendly match with Slovakia, a 2–0 win in Graz on 27 March 2002. He remained a regular until September 2007, when he made a public outburst against Austrian Football Association president Friedrich Stickler which meant that, for the next 18 months, he was cast into the international wilderness.

Linz returned to the national side in time for UEFA Euro 2008 on home soil, starting in the first two of Austria's matches during the tournament but finishing goalless as the nation crashed out at the first hurdle.

== Career statistics ==
=== Club ===
Appearances and goals by club, season and competition
Club	Season	League			National cup		League cup		Continental (Note: Appearances UEFA Europa League, UEFA Intertoto Cup, and AFC Champions League)		Total	
Club	Season	League	Apps	Goals	Apps	Goals	Apps	Goals	Apps	Goals	Apps	Goals
DSV Leoben	1999–2000	Austrian First League	0	0	2	0	—		—		2	0
DSV Leoben	2000–01	Austrian First League	12	3	1	0	—		—		13	3
DSV Leoben	Total		12	3	3	0	0	0	0	0	15	3
Austria Wien	2001–02	Austrian Bundesliga	29	8	3	3	—		—		32	11
Austria Wien	2002–03	Austrian Bundesliga	21	3	3	0	—		1	0	25	3
Austria Wien	Total		50	11	6	3	0	0	1	0	57	14
Admira Mödling	2003–04	Austrian Bundesliga	31	15	3	3	—		—		34	18
Nice	2004–05	Ligue 1	15	0	0	0	1	0	1	0	17	0
Sturm Graz	2004–05	Austrian Bundesliga	13	4	0	0	—		0	0	13	4
Austria Wien	2005–06	Austrian Bundesliga	31	15	1	0	—		4	3	36	18
Boavista	2006–07	Primeira Liga	28	10	4	1	—		—		32	11
Boavista	2007–08	Primeira Liga	0	0	0	0	1	0	—		1	0
Boavista	Total		28	10	4	1	1	0	0	0	33	11
Braga	2007–08	Primeira Liga	27	11	4	0	0	0	8	5	39	16
Braga	2008–09	Primeira Liga	6	0	3	1	0	0	6	3	15	4
Braga	Total		33	11	7	1	0	0	14	8	54	20
Grasshoppers (loan)	2008–09	Swiss Super League	16	7	1	0	—		—		17	7
Gaziantepspor	2009–10	Süper Lig	5	0	0	0	—		—		5	0
Austria Wien	2009–10	Austrian Bundesliga	15	6	1	0	—		—		16	6
Austria Wien	2010–11	Austrian Bundesliga	36	21	4	2	—		6	3	46	26
Austria Wien	2011–12	Austrian Bundesliga	28	12	3	2	—		10	2	41	16
Austria Wien	2012–13	Austrian Bundesliga	7	1	2	2	—		—		9	3
Austria Wien	Total		86	40	10	6	0	0	16	5	112	51
Muangthong United	2013	Thai League T1	4	1	0	0	—		6	0	10	1
Belenenses	2013–14	Primeira Liga	3	0	0	0	2	0	—		5	0
Career total			327	117	35	14	4	0	41	16	407	147

== Honours ==
Austria Wien

- Austrian Bundesliga: 2002–03, 2005–06, 2012–13
- Austrian Cup: 2002–03, 2005–06

Braga

- UEFA Intertoto Cup: 2008

Individual

- Austrian Bundesliga top scorer: 2005–06, 2010–11
