= Marin Leovac =

Croatian footballer (born 1988)

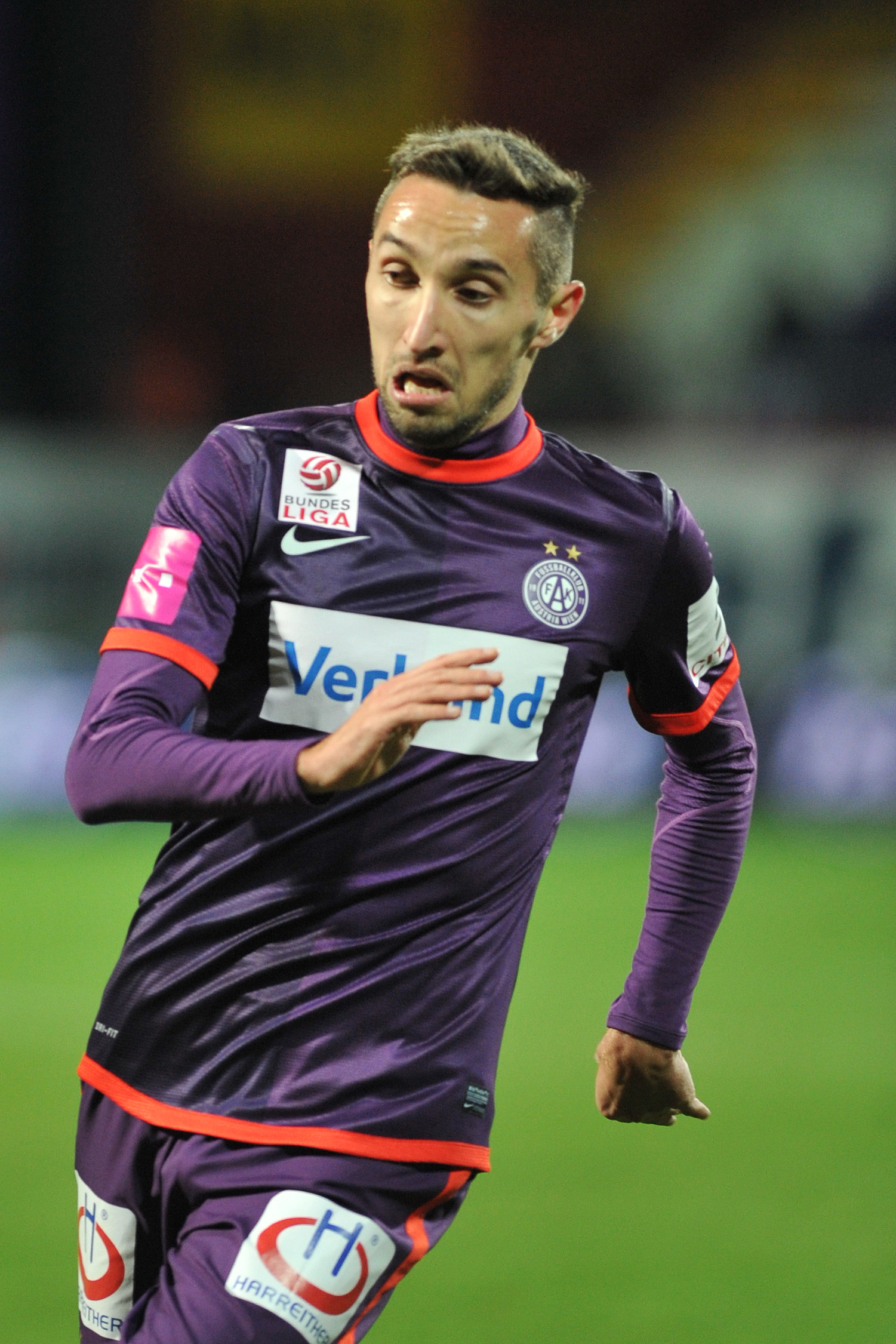
- Leovac with Austria Wien in 2013

Personal information
- Date of birth: 7 August 1988 (age 38)
- Place of birth: Jajce, SR Bosnia and Herzegovina, Yugoslavia
- Height: 1.80 m (5 ft 11 in)
- Position: Left back

Team information
- Current team: Lokomotiva
- Number: 4

Youth career
- 1997–2001: Sportunion Aschbach
- 2001–2002: USV Oed/Zeillern
- 2002–2007: Austria Wien

Senior career*
Years	Team	Apps	(Gls)
2007–2009	Austria Wien II	66	(2)
2009–2013	Austria Wien	52	(0)
2013–2015	Rijeka	44	(3)
2015–2018	PAOK	65	(4)
2018	→ Rijeka (loan)	9	(0)
2018–2022	Dinamo Zagreb	47	(3)
2022–2023	Osijek	27	(2)
2023–	Lokomotiva Zagreb	53	(0)

International career
2014–2019	Croatia	5	(0)
- * Club domestic league appearances and goals as of 15 June 2026

Marin Leovac (Croatian pronunciation: [mâriːn lěoʋats]; born 7 August 1988) is a Croatian professional footballer who plays as a left back for Lokomotiva.

== Early career ==
Leovac began his career in July 1997 in Austria with Sportunion Aschbach and signed in March 2001 with USV Oed/Zeillern. After only one year left USV Oed/Zeillern and signed in August 2002 a contract with Austria Wien.

== Club career ==
=== Austria Wien ===
Leovac spent three seasons playing for the Austria Wien II, before making his debut for the first team in 2009–10 season. He made his debut for Austria Wien in Europa League match against SV Werder Bremen, playing 90 minutes in eventual 2–0 loss. In his first season with Austria he made 8 Bundesliga appearances.

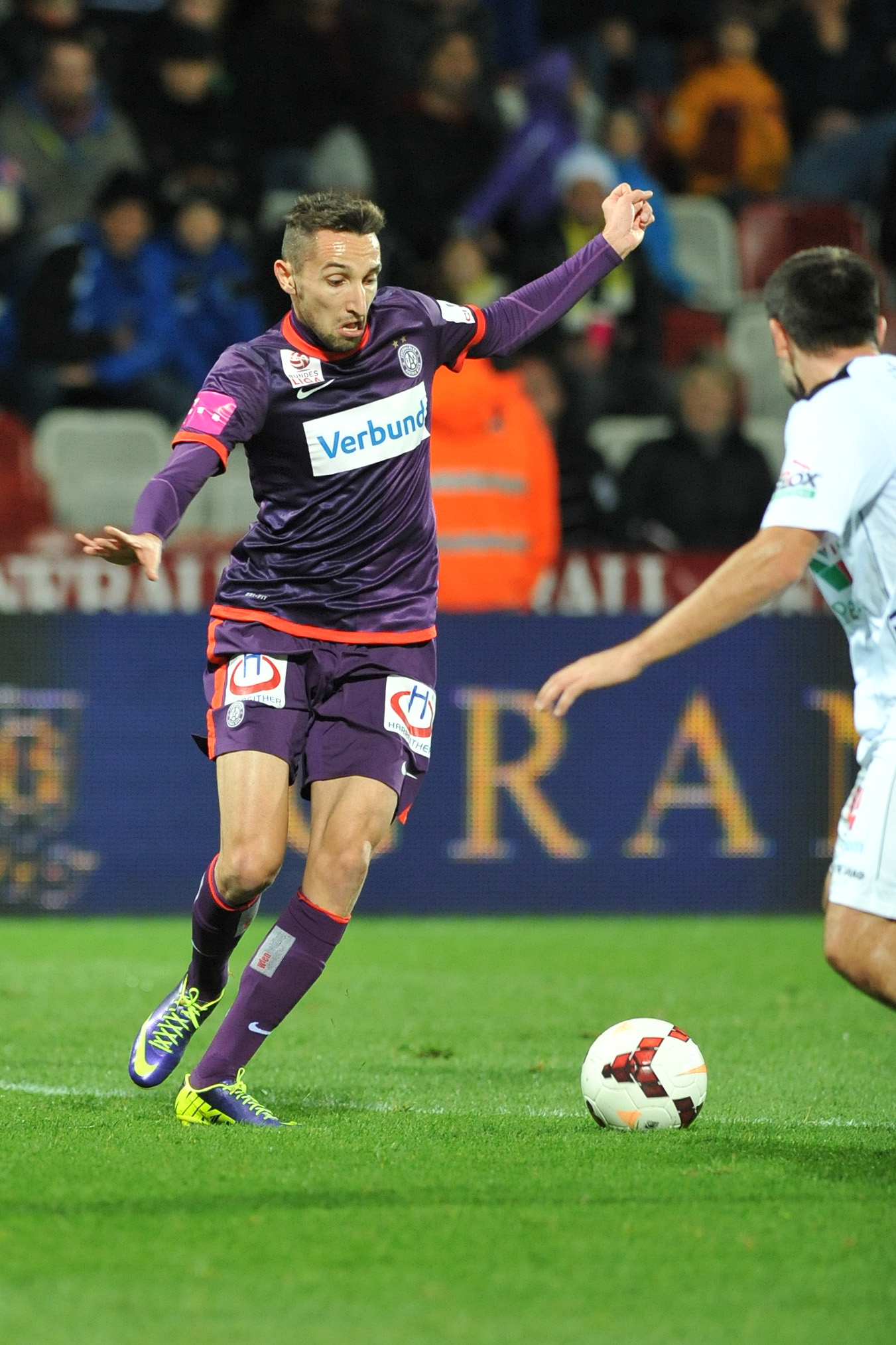
Leovac playing for Austria Wien in 2013.

In 2013–2014 he helped Austria Wien reach UEFA Champions League group stage, when he netted the opening goal in 0–2 win over Croatian champions Dinamo Zagreb in Champions League Play-off match played in Zagreb. He made four appearances in 2013–2014 Champions League Group G.

=== Rijeka ===
In January 2014 Leovac signed with Croatian Prva HNL team HNK Rijeka, for a reported fee of €250,000. In his first half season with Rijeka he made 11 appearances in Prva HNL and helped the team win Croatian Cup.

=== PAOK ===
According to reports in Croatia PAOK are set to complete a deal for the Rijeka left back Marin Leovac. It is believed that the talks between the two parties are in an advanced stage and the clubs are due to agree a fee in the region of €1 million. PAOK manager Igor Tudor is a big admirer of the 26-year-old left back and the move, according to the Croatian reports, will be finalised soon. On 8 August 2015, according to reports in Croatia, HNK Rijeka left back Marin Leovac is heading to PAOK. Croatian reports believe that the 26-year-old left back has already agreed terms with PAOK and he is likely to complete the move imminently. Eventually, on 11 August 2015, PAOK have officially announced the transfer of Croatian left back Marin Leovac. The 27-year-old has signed a 4-year contract with the Greek club. On 13 September 2015, Leovac injured during a Super League game against Veria. PAOK have been expecting updates on Leovac's injury and Igor Tudor was hopeful that it would not be anything serious. However the scans revealed that the problem was bigger than expected and it will force Leovac out of action for at least a month.

Leovac, who is in his third season with PAOK, is ready to leave Thessaloniki. Unable to cope with Răzvan Lucescu's demands, Leovac wants to find a new club for himself, claiming that PAOK cannot meet his expectations. Lucescu has inserted Vieirinha in the left-back role in place of Leovac and Dorian Lévêque, but PAOK understand their need to strengthen this area of the pitch if they're to have any chance of claiming an historic league title.

On 6 February 2018, PAOK reached an agreement with Leovac's ex-club HNK Rijeka on a six months loan until the end of the season, with a €1.3 million purchase option. Leovac remaining season's annual fee will be paid from his former club, as the player gave €150,000 of his contract, to sign with Rijeka.

=== Dinamo Zagreb ===
On 18 June he signed a contract with champions Dinamo Zagreb for an estimated amount of €500,000. Leovac scored his first goal for Dinamo in a 3–0 win over Istra 1961, on 3 August 2018.

== International career ==
In November 2014, after a string of good performances for HNK Rijeka, Leovac was called up for the Croatia national team friendly match against Argentina. He played full 90 minutes in his debut for the national team on November 12, 2014, in a friendly game against Argentina. On 27 October 2016, Leovac was called up in his motherland's national squad, after more than 13 months, ahead of the upcoming World Cup qualifier against Iceland. On 15 November 2016, he was a starter in a friendly away match against Northern Ireland. He earned a total of 5 caps, scoring no goals. His final international was a March 2019 European Championship qualification match away against Hungary.

== Career statistics ==
As of 22 May 2021

Appearances and goals by club, season and competition
Club	Season	League			National Cup		Europe		Other		Total	
Club	Season	Division	Apps	Goals	Apps	Goals	Apps	Goals	Apps	Goals	Apps	Goals
Austria Wien	2009–10	Austrian Bundesliga	8	0	–		1 (Note: Appearances in UEFA Europa League)	0	–		9	0
Austria Wien	2010–11	Austrian Bundesliga	18	0	2	0	4	0	–		24	0
Austria Wien	2011–12	Austrian Bundesliga	17	0	2	0	3	0	–		22	0
Austria Wien	2012–13	Austrian Bundesliga	2	0	–		–		–		2	0
Austria Wien	2013–14	Austrian Bundesliga	7	0	–		6 (Note: Appearances in UEFA Champions League)	1	–		13	1
Austria Wien	Total		52	0	4	0	14	1	–		70	1
Rijeka	2013–14	Prva HNL	10	0	3	0	–		–		13	0
Rijeka	2014–15	Prva HNL	29	2	5	0	9	1	1 (Note: Appearance in Croatian Football Super Cup)	0	44	3
Rijeka	2015–16	Prva HNL	5	1	–		2	0	–		7	1
Rijeka	Total		44	3	8	0	11	1	1	0	64	4
PAOK	2015–16	Super League Greece	25	1	4	0	2	0	–		31	1
PAOK	2016–17	Super League Greece	31	2	7	0	11 (Note: Two appearances in UEFA Champions League, nine appearances in UEFA Europa League)	0	–		49	2
PAOK	2017–18	Super League Greece	9	1	–		4	0	–		13	1
PAOK	Total		65	4	11	0	17	0	–		93	4
Rijeka (loan)	2017–18	Prva HNL	9	0	1	0	–		–		10	0
Dinamo Zagreb	2018–19	Prva HNL	12	2	1	0	10 (Note: Six appearances in UEFA Champions League, four appearances in UEFA Europa League)	0	–		23	2
Dinamo Zagreb	2019–20	Prva HNL	19	1	3	0	11	1	1	0	34	2
Dinamo Zagreb	2020–21	Prva HNL	12	0	1	0	8 (Note: Two appearances in UEFA Champions League, six appearances in UEFA Europa League)	0	0	0	21	0
Dinamo Zagreb	Total		43	3	5	0	29	1	1	0	78	4
Career total			213	10	29	0	71	3	2	0	315	13

== Personal life ==
Leovac was born in the town of Jajce, in modern Bosnia and Herzegovina, which was at the time part of SFR Yugoslavia. He holds dual citizenship of Austria and Croatia. He was eligible to represent all three countries in international football. He ultimately opted to play for Croatia national team, making his debut in 2014.

== Honours ==
Austria Wien

- Austrian Bundesliga: 2012–13

Rijeka

- Croatian Cup: 2013–14
- Croatian Super Cup: 2014

PAOK

- Greek Cup: 2016–17

Dinamo Zagreb

- Prva HNL: 2018–19, 2019–20, 2020–21
- Croatian Cup: 2020–21
- Croatian Super Cup: 2019

Individual

- Football Oscar Team of the Year: 2015
