= Markus Suttner =

Austrian footballer

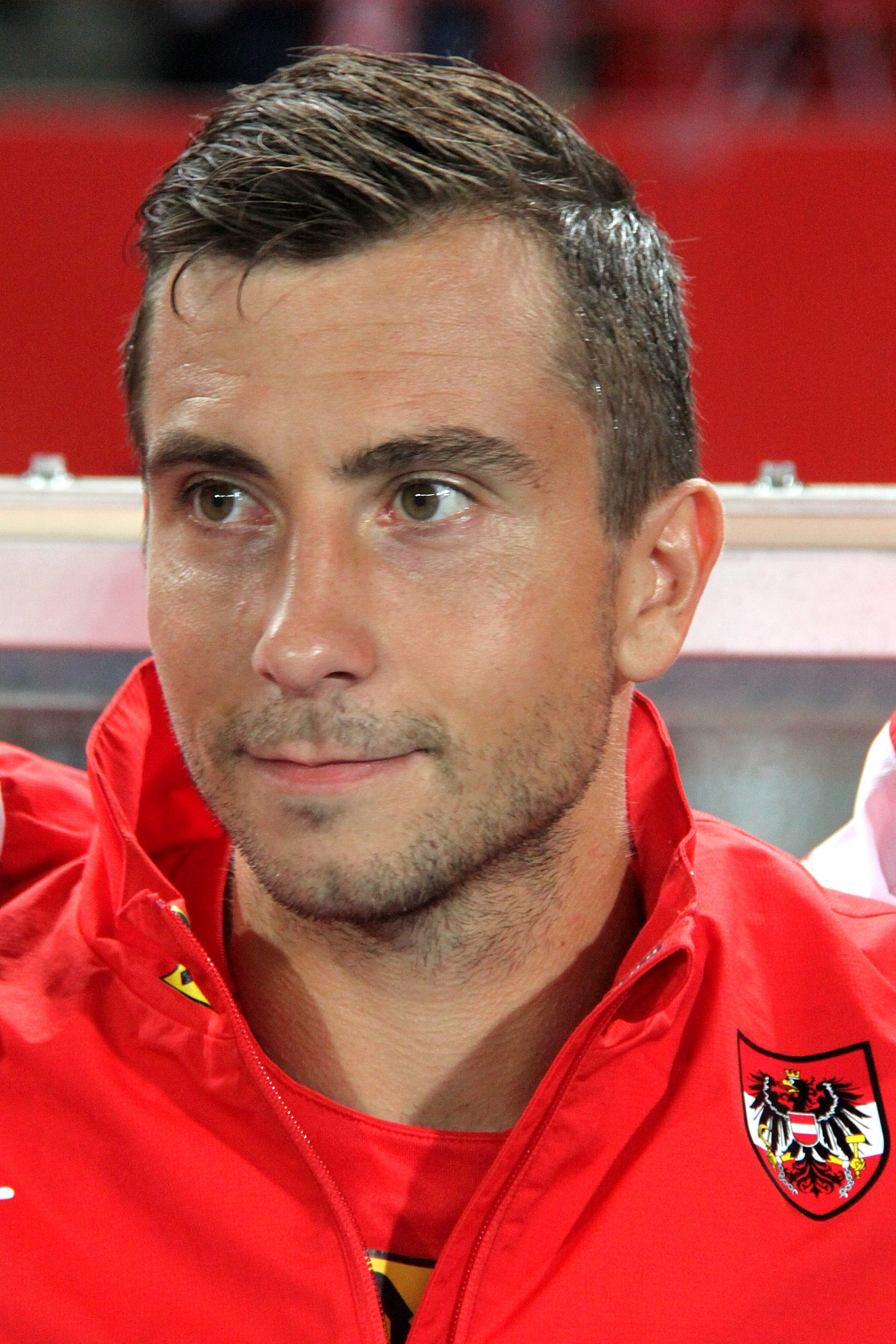
- Suttner with Austria in 2015

Personal information
- Full name: Markus Suttner
- Date of birth: 16 April 1987 (age 39)
- Place of birth: Hollabrunn, Austria
- Height: 1.79 m (5 ft 10 in)
- Position: Left-back

Youth career
- 1993–2001: SK Wullersdorf
- 2001–2004: Stronach-Akademie
- 2004–2008: Austria Wien

Senior career*
Years	Team	Apps	(Gls)
2007–2015	Austria Wien	207	(9)
2015–2017	Ingolstadt	49	(4)
2017–2019	Brighton & Hove Albion	14	(0)
2019	→ Fortuna Düsseldorf (loan)	6	(1)
2019–2020	Fortuna Düsseldorf	21	(0)
2020–2022	Austria Wien	47	(1)
2022	SK Wullersdorf	0	(0)
Total		344	(15)

International career
2007–2008	Austria U21	7	(0)
2012–2017	Austria	20	(0)
- * Club domestic league appearances and goals

Markus Suttner (born 16 April 1987) is a retired Austrian professional footballer who played as a left-back.

== Club career ==
=== Austria Wien ===
Suttner came through the youth system at Austria Wien before making his breakthrough season at the Viennan club in his first professional season, in the 2008–09 season where he made 22 league appearances. He also made two appearances in the Austrian Cup in which they won. He made five appearances in the Europa League in 2009 where Wien qualified through the third round and the play off round but finished bottom of the group finishing with two points. He scored his first goal in football in the 2010–11 season. Suttner won his first Austria national team cap whilst at the club in 2012. Suttner played in 35 league games, scoring three in the 2012–13 campaign where Austria Wien won the league title for the first time in seven years.

Wien were to compete in the Champions League in the 2013–14 campaign after being crowned champions of the Austrian league in previous season. They managed to qualify to the group stages from the third round of qualifying. However, they finished bottom of their group.

Suttner played in one more season for the club where they finished 7th before moving to Germany.

=== FC Ingolstadt 04 ===
Suttner signed for newly promoted FC Ingolstadt 04 in the summer of 2015. In his first season he made 18 league appearances as the team finished 11th in the table. Suttner scored his first German Bundesliga goal in the 2016–17 season where he finished with four goals to his name in 31 appearances. However, the season ended in relegation for the Bavarian side.

=== Brighton & Hove Albion ===
On 13 July 2017, Suttner signed for another newly promoted side, Brighton & Hove Albion of the Premier League. Just 12 days beforehand his Ingolstadt teammate Pascal Gross signed for the Sussex club. Suttner made his debut for Brighton on 12 August 2017 in the opening game of the season at home to Manchester City in which The Seagulls lost 2–0 to the eventual champions. He played in the following game in another 2–0 scoreline, this time in an away defeat to Leicester City. Suttner played in Brighton's first ever win in the Premier League in a 3–1 home win over West Brom on 9 September 2017 in which Pascal Gross scored two with Tomer Hemed netting the other. Suttner made his FA Cup debut in a 1–0 away win over Middlesbrough with Glenn Murray scoring a 90th-minute winner. Suttner played in three FA Cup matches where they were eventually knocked out by Manchester United in the Quarter Finals. Brighton finished the season in 15th place securing safety in a 1–0 home win over Manchester United on 4 May 2018 where Gross scored a header that only just crossed the line from a José Izquierdo cross. Suttner was absent from this match squad however. In his first season at Brighton he played 14 Premier League matches and three FA Cup matches.

Suttner played in his first EFL Cup match on 28 August 2018 in a 1–0 home defeat against south coast rivals, Southampton. This turned out to be his only appearance for the Sussex club this season being sent out on loan in January 2019.

==== Loan to Fortuna Düsseldorf ====
Suttner signed for Fortuna Düsseldorf on loan on 18 January 2019 who were playing their first season in the German top flight since the 2012–13 Bundesliga. He made his debut on 6 February in a DFB Pokal match where he started and played the full match in the 4–1 away defeat to Schalke 04. The next game he played in was a league game away against Bayer Leverkusen where Fortuna lost 2–0 on 17 February. On 27 April Suttner scored against Werder Bremen to make it 4–1 and to seal the win.

=== Fortuna Düsseldorf ===
On 30 July 2019, Suttner joined Fortuna Düsseldorf on a year-long contract.

== International career ==
Suttner made seven appearances for the Austria U21 national team Under-21 side, before making his full debut for Austria on 1 June 2012, in the 3–2 win over Ukraine in a friendly match. Suttner was a part of the squad for the UEFA Euro 2016 but did not make an appearance in any of the three games where Austria finished bottom of their group. After 20 caps, it was announced on 10 May 2017, that he had retired from international football.

== Career statistics ==
=== Club ===
Appearances and goals by club, season and competition
Club	Season	League			National cup		League cup		Other		Total	
Club	Season	Division	Apps	Goals	Apps	Goals	Apps	Goals	Apps	Goals	Apps	Goals
Austria Wien	2008–09	Austrian Bundesliga	22	0	2	0	—		0	0	24	0
Austria Wien	2009–10	Austrian Bundesliga	27	0	3	0	—		5 (Note: Appearances in UEFA Europa League)	0	35	0
Austria Wien	2010–11	Austrian Bundesliga	27	2	1	0	—		6	0	34	2
Austria Wien	2011–12	Austrian Bundesliga	30	1	3	0	—		12	0	45	1
Austria Wien	2012–13	Austrian Bundesliga	35	3	5	0	—		—		40	3
Austria Wien	2013–14	Austrian Bundesliga	35	2	2	0	—		9 (Note: Appearances in UEFA Champions League)	0	46	2
Austria Wien	2014–15	Austrian Bundesliga	31	1	5	0	—		—		36	1
Austria Wien	Total		207	9	21	0	—		32	0	260	9
FC Ingolstadt 04	2015–16	Bundesliga	18	0	1	0	—		—		19	0
FC Ingolstadt 04	2016–17	Bundesliga	31	4	2	0	—		—		33	4
FC Ingolstadt 04	Total		49	4	3	0	—		0	0	52	4
Brighton & Hove Albion	2017–18	Premier League	14	0	3	0	0	0	—		17	0
Brighton & Hove Albion	2018–19	Premier League	0	0	0	0	1	0	—		1	0
Brighton & Hove Albion	Total		14	0	3	0	1	0	0	0	18	0
Brighton & Hove Albion U23	2018–19	Premier League 2 Division 1	1	0	–		–		—		1	0
Fortuna Düsseldorf (loan)	2018–19	Bundesliga	6	1	1	0	—		—		7	1
Fortuna Düsseldorf	2019–20	Bundesliga	21	0	0	0	—		—		21	0
Austria Wien	2020–21	Austrian Bundesliga	21	0	4	0	—		3 (Note: Appearances in Austrian Bundesliga play-offs)	0	28	0
Austria Wien	2021–22	Austrian Bundesliga	29	1	0	0	0		0	0	29	1
Austria Wien	Total		47	1	4	0	0	0	3	0	57	1
Career total			345	15	32	0	1	0	35	0	417	15

== Honours ==
Austria Wien

- Austrian Bundesliga: 2012–13
- Austrian Cup: 2008–09
