= Nacer Barazite =

Dutch footballer (born 1990)

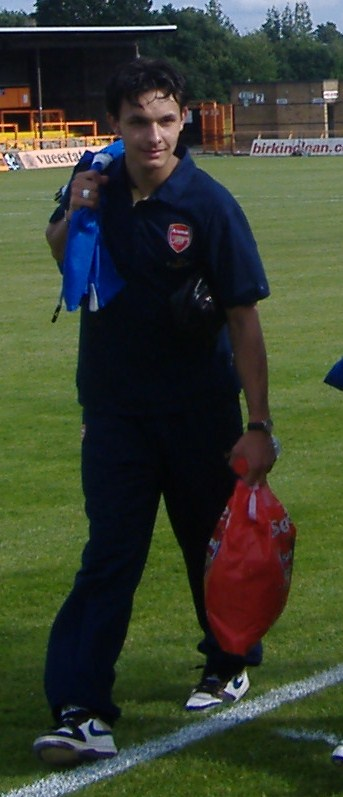
- Barazite with Arsenal in 2007

Personal information
- Full name: Nacer Barazite
- Date of birth: 27 May 1990 (age 36)
- Place of birth: Arnhem, Netherlands
- Height: 1.88 m (6 ft 2 in)
- Positions: Attacking midfielder; striker

Youth career
- –2006: NEC
- 2006–2007: Arsenal

Senior career*
Years	Team	Apps	(Gls)
2007–2011	Arsenal	0	(0)
2008–2009	→ Derby County (loan)	30	(1)
2010–2011	→ Vitesse (loan)	9	(0)
2011–2012	Austria Wien	34	(12)
2012–2014	Monaco	11	(0)
2013	→ Austria Wien (loan)	5	(1)
2014–2017	Utrecht	75	(16)
2016	→ Jong Utrecht	2	(1)
2017–2018	Yeni Malatyaspor	15	(2)
2018–2019	Al Jazira	22	(4)
2019–2020	Buriram United	14	(6)
Total		217	(37)

International career
2006–2007	Netherlands U17	8	(3)
2007–2009	Netherlands U19	17	(6)
2009–2012	Netherlands U20	6	(2)
2009–2012	Netherlands U21	9	(1)
- * Club domestic league appearances and goals as of 10:00, 24 December 2018 (UTC)

Nacer Barazite (born 27 May 1990) is a Dutch professional footballer who can play either as an attacking midfielder or striker. Most recently, he played for Thai club Buriram United.

Barazite has during his career played for, among others, English clubs Arsenal and Derby County, Dutch sides Vitesse and Utrecht, Austrian team Austria Wien and French club Monaco.

He is a Dutch youth international, and has gained nine caps for the Netherlands U21 team.

== Club career ==
=== Arsenal ===
Born in Arnhem, Barazite started his career as a youth player with NEC Nijmegen. He joined Arsenal in 2006 and regularly featured for the U18 and Reserve teams throughout 2006–07. Whilst playing in Arsenal's academy, Barazite helped take the gooners to the semifinals of the 2006–07 FA Youth Cup. He signed a professional contract with the club in August 2007, having scored for the first team in a pre-season friendly against Barnet the previous month.

Barazite made his competitive Arsenal first-team début on 31 October 2007, as a substitute for Eduardo da Silva against Sheffield United in a League Cup Fourth Round match. His second appearance also came as a substitute, for Mark Randall in Arsenal's League Cup quarter-final against Blackburn Rovers on 18 December 2007, but after only 17 minutes on the pitch he was stretchered off with a dislocated shoulder, and replaced by Fran Mérida.

Barazite returned to reserve-team action after his injury, and scored his first hat trick for Arsenal in the under-18s, in a 5–2 win over Southampton. The other two were scored by Luke Freeman. Barazite was also named on the Arsenal bench for the final Premier League game against Sunderland on 11 May 2008, but was not brought on.

Barazite featured in Arsenal's preseason campaign for 2008–09, scoring for Arsenal in a 2–1 win against Barnet in a pre-season friendly at Underhill in July. On 19 August 2008, Barazite joined Championship side Derby County, initially until the end of the year but extended the loan until the end of the season. Barazite was named Man of the Match as Derby won their first game for a week short of a year, despite coming off the bench at half time. He was instrumental in the 2–1 win and set up the winner late in the game. On 29 December 2008, it was confirmed that his loan spell at Derby County was to be extended until the end of the 2008–09 season. He scored his first goal for Derby and also set up a goal, on 18 February at home to Blackpool in a 4–1 victory.

Barazite again featured in Arsenal's preseason campaign for 2009–10, scoring a third time for Arsenal in a 2–2 draw against Barnet in a pre-season friendly at Underhill on 18 July 2009. Barazite was involved in Arsenal's 2–0 win over West Brom in the League Cup where he replaced Armand Traoré in the 69th minute of play. He then suffered a shoulder injury which kept him out of the game for four months.

On 10 August 2010, it was announced that Barazite had gone on trial for Scottish club, Rangers, with view to a season-long loan at the Scottish club. He played 77 minutes of Rangers friendly against Glentoran. Despite losing 2–1, Barazite impressed the club.

On the transfer deadline, he joined the Dutch club Vitesse Arnhem on loan for the entire 2010–11 season. On 11 September 2010, he made his debut, making his first start, in a 1–0 loss against Heerenveen. In the third round of KNVB Cup, he scored twice in a 6–0 win over Flevo Boys; followed his third in the fourth of KNVB Cup in a 3–0 win over Rijnsburgse Boys. However, Vitesse decided to terminate the loan deal in December 2010.

=== Austria Wien ===
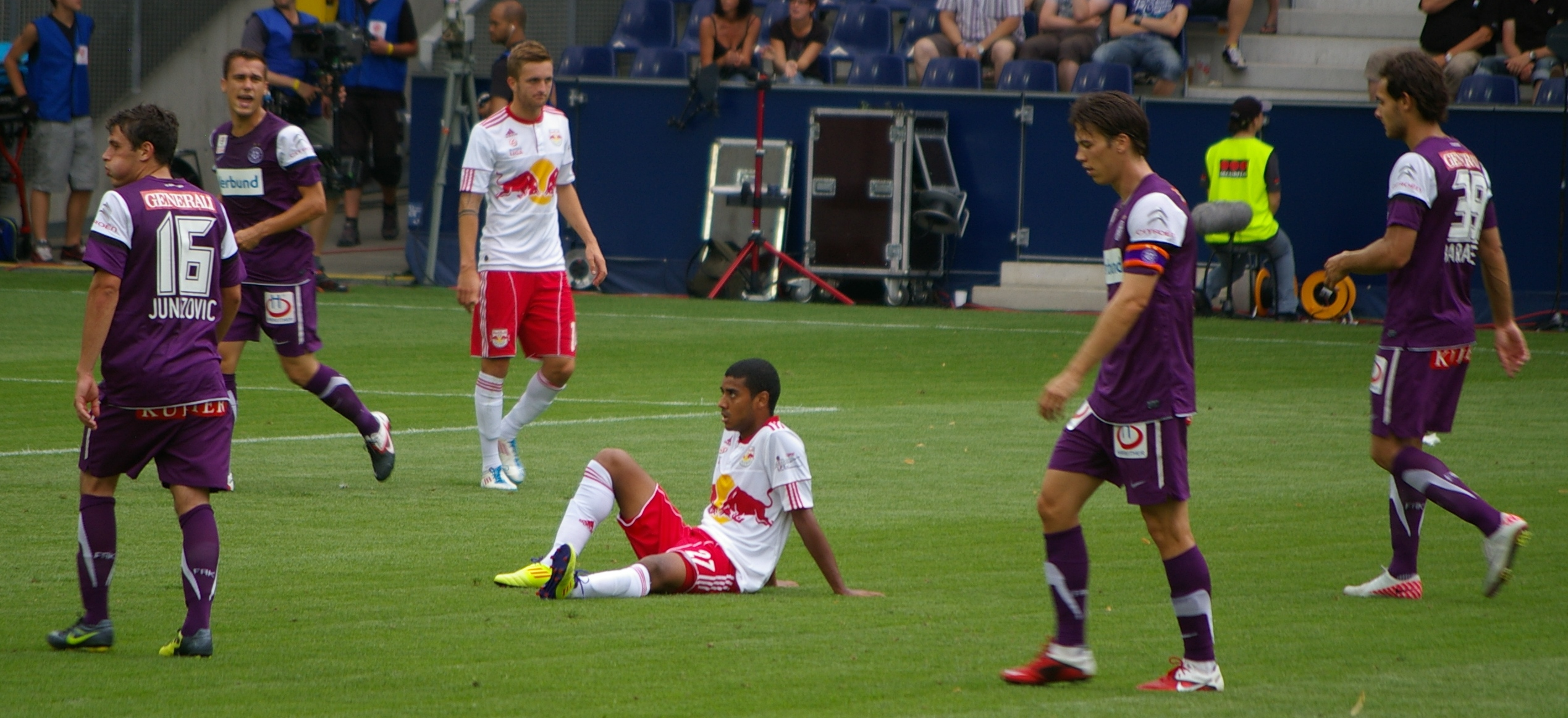
Barazite (in a 39 number shirt) in a league match against Red Bull Salzburg

On 31 January 2011, Barazite signed a contract with Austrian giants Austria Wien. The contract was due to keep him at the club until 2013. He played his first game on 12 February 2011; scored his first goal in Austria Wien's 4–0 victory over Wiener Neustadt on 19 February 2011 and also set up a goal in the match. On 11 May 2011, Barazite received a red card for the first time in his professional career after a second bookable offence in a 1–1 draw against Sturm Graz. In his first half season at Austria Wien, the club finished third place, resulting a qualification in a Europa League. For Barazite, he became a regular in the first team, playing in the striker position and scored four goals in sixteen appearances.

The next season was a bigger role for Barazite as he soon have more develop more scoring form in the league and European. In Europa League's Qualifiers, Barazite scored in both legs in the second round against Rudar Pljevlja; twice in the first leg and once in the second leg. In third round against Olimpija Ljubljana, though not scoring in the first leg in a 1–1 draw, he would score a hat-trick in a 3–2 win. Soon after in a Qualification Round of Europa League first leg, he scored a brace in a 3–1 win over Gaz Metan Mediaș and would go through to the group stage, despite losing 1–0 in the second leg. Three days later, he scored his first of the season in a 3–0 win over rival Rapid Wien. With eight goals all in Europa League becoming the highest tally of any player in the competition, Barazite says that was his best time of his career In the Group stage, Barazite would score three times against Malmö twice in two separate legs and once against AZ. But Vienna was out of the Europa League with two wins, two draws and two losses, having same point with AZ, but only a few goal differences than AZ. Elsewhere in the league, he scored more goals, like last season, with eight, including a brace against Admira Wacker Mödling on 19 November 2011.

=== Monaco ===
In January 2012, Barazite signed with AS Monaco on a four-year contract with a transfer fee of €4.5 million. He made his debut in February 2012, in a 1–0 home defeat against Bastia. However his first half of the season at AS Monaco was a reduced playing time after striking partnership of Valère Germain and Ibrahima Touré took his place in the first team and for him as he made seven appearances. The next season, Barazite scored his first goal for the club in the Coupe de la Ligue in a 1–1 draw against Nîmes and Monaco would eventually win on penalties.

=== Return to Austria Wien ===
On 30 January 2013, Barazite rejoined Austria Wien on loan until the end of the season, with an option to make the deal permanent for a speculated €1 million. Upon the move, Chief Financial Officer Markus Kraetschmer claimed that Barazite had become disillusioned during his time at Monaco and had renounced money, instead wanting to play.

On his return, Barazite made his first appearance since leaving Austria Wien coming on as a substitute against derby rival Rapid Wien and provided the assist for Philipp Hosiner's winning goal. Soon after Barazite suffered a knee injury requiring surgery. Two months later, on 28 April 2013 and towards the end of the season, Barazite made his return coming on as a substitute for Hosiner near full-time in a 2–0 win over Admira Wacker Mödling. In an interview, Barazite expressed his desire to stay at the club after the end of the loan spell. On 11 May 2013, he scored his first goal after his return from injury before setting up Hosiner for the third goal in a 3–0 win over Wacker Innsbruck. The season ended with the club winning the league title for the first time in seven years.

=== Return to Monaco ===
Barazite went on to pick up a winners medal from being capped in Monaco's victorious Ligue 2 campaign of that season.

=== Utrecht ===
On 26 June 2014, it was announced that Eredivisie side FC Utrecht had signed Barazite.

=== Al Jazira ===
On 2 September 2018, he signed for UAE Pro-League club Al Jazira for one season from Yeni Malatyaspor.

=== Buriram United ===
In 2019, Barazite signed for Buriram United in Thailand.

== International career ==
Barazite has played for the Netherlands national under-17 football team, being a member of the side in the 2007 UEFA European Under-17 Football Championship; he scored in the Netherlands' 2–2 draw with Belgium, but the Netherlands did not progress beyond the group stage. He was a regular in the U-19 team for the 2009 European Championship qualifying campaign that ended when they narrowly missed out on a tournament spot on goal difference in the elite qualification stage. On 9 October, he made his first appearance in the 2011 U-21 European Championship qualifying, coming on as a second-half substitute.

== Personal life ==
Barazite has a son.

== Career statistics ==
Appearances and goals by club, season and competition
Club	Season	League			National cup		League cup		Europe		Other		Total	
Club	Season	Division	Apps	Goals	Apps	Goals	Apps	Goals	Apps	Goals	Apps	Goals	Apps	Goals
Arsenal	2007–08	Premier League	0	0	0	0	2	0	0	0	–		2	0
Arsenal	2009–10	Premier League	0	0	0	0	1	0	0	0	–		1	0
Arsenal	Total		0	0	0	0	3	0	0	0	0	0	3	0
Derby County (loan)	2008–09	Football League Championship	30	1	4	0	2	0	0	0	–		36	1
Vitesse Arnhem (loan)	2010–11	Eredivisie	9	0	2	3	–		0	0	–		11	3
Austria Wien	2010–11	Austrian Bundesliga	16	4	1	0	–		0	0	–		17	4
Austria Wien	2011–12	Austrian Bundesliga	18	8	3	0	–		12	11	–		33	19
Austria Wien	Total		34	12	4	0	0	0	12	11	0	0	50	23
Monaco	2011–12	Ligue 2	7	0	0	0	0	0	0	0	–		7	0
Monaco	2012–13	Ligue 2	4	0	0	0	1	1	0	0	–		5	1
Monaco	Total		11	0	0	0	1	1	0	0	0	0	12	1
Austria Wien (loan)	2012–13	Austrian Bundesliga	5	1	0	0	–		0	0	–		5	1
FC Utrecht	2014–15	Eredivisie	16	2	0	0	–		–		–		17	2
FC Utrecht	2015–16	Eredivisie	32	8	5	3	–		–		4	0	17	2
FC Utrecht	2016–17	Eredivisie	27	6	4	1	–		–		4	0	17	2
FC Utrecht	Total		75	16	9	4	0	0	0	0	8	0	92	20
Jong FC Utrecht	2016–17	Eerste Divisie	2	1	–		–		–		–		2	1
Career total			166	31	19	7	6	1	12	11	8	0	211	50

== Honours ==
AS Monaco

- Ligue 2: 2013

Austria Wien

- Austrian Bundesliga: 2013
