= Patrick Tischler =

Austrian footballer

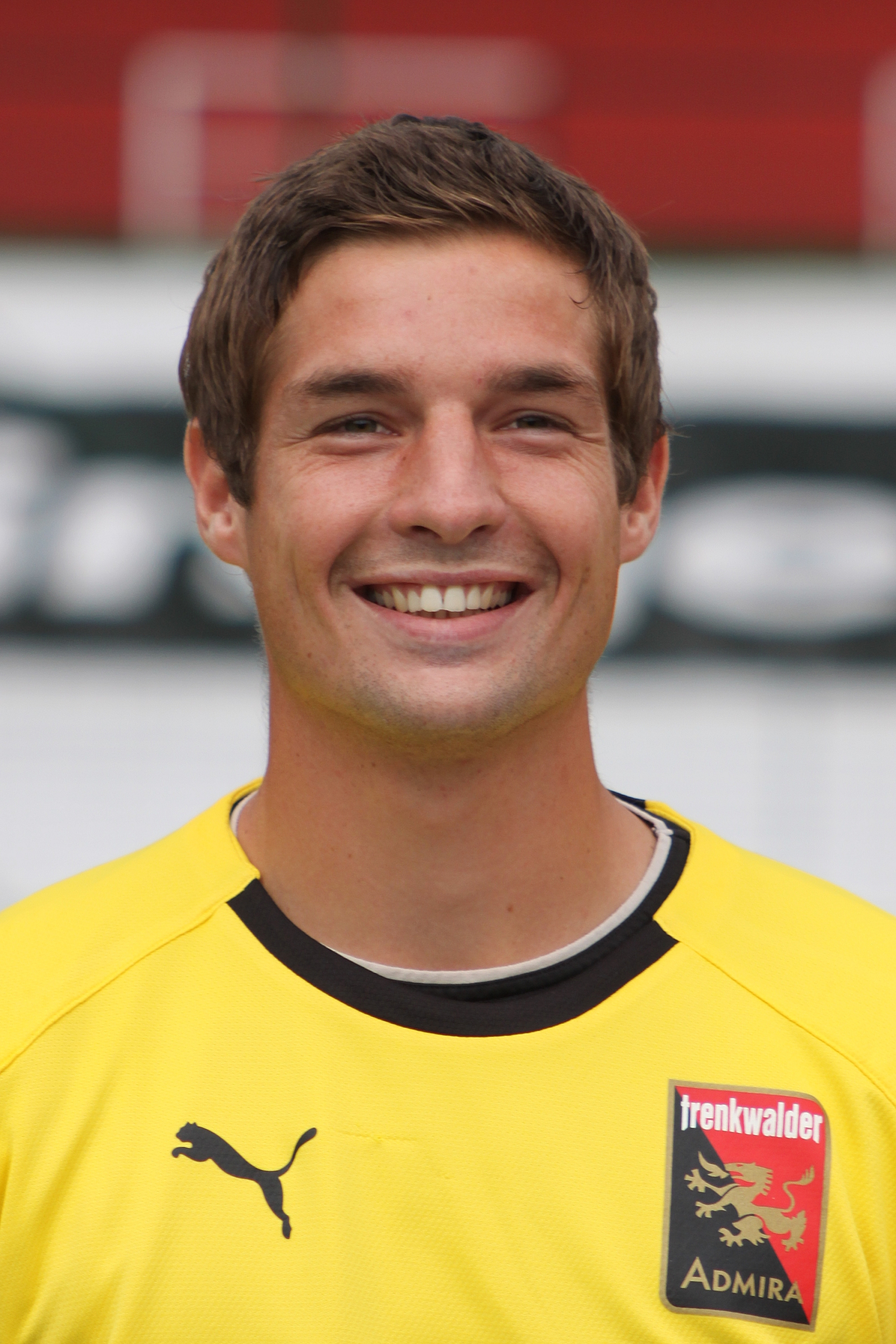

Personal information
- Full name: Patrick Tischler
- Date of birth: 20 February 1987 (age 39)
- Place of birth: Austria
- Position: Goalkeeper

Senior career*
Years	Team	Apps	(Gls)
2008–2014	Admira Wacker	63	(0)
- * Club domestic league appearances and goals as of 22 April 2014

Patrick Tischler (born 20 February 1987) is an Austrian footballer. He left Austrian Bundesliga club Admira Wacker by mutual consent in February 2014 to pursue vocational training outside football.
