= Bernd Besenlehner =

Austrian footballer (born 1986)

Personal information
- Full name: Bernd Besenlehner
- Date of birth: 24 November 1986 (age 39)
- Place of birth: Austria
- Height: 1.79 m (5 ft 10 1/2 in)
- Position: Midfielder

Team information
- Current team: ASK Eggendorf

Senior career*
Years	Team	Apps	(Gls)
2007–2009	SC Oberpullendorf	36	(5)
2009–2013	SC Wiener Neustadt	24	(0)
2013–	ASK Eggendorf		
- * Club domestic league appearances and goals as of 06:28, 21 July 2013 (UTC)

Bernd Besenlehner (born 24 November 1986) is an Austrian footballer who plays for ASK Eggendorf.

Besenlehner previously played professional football with SC Wiener Neustadt.
