= Manuel Wallner =

Austrian footballer

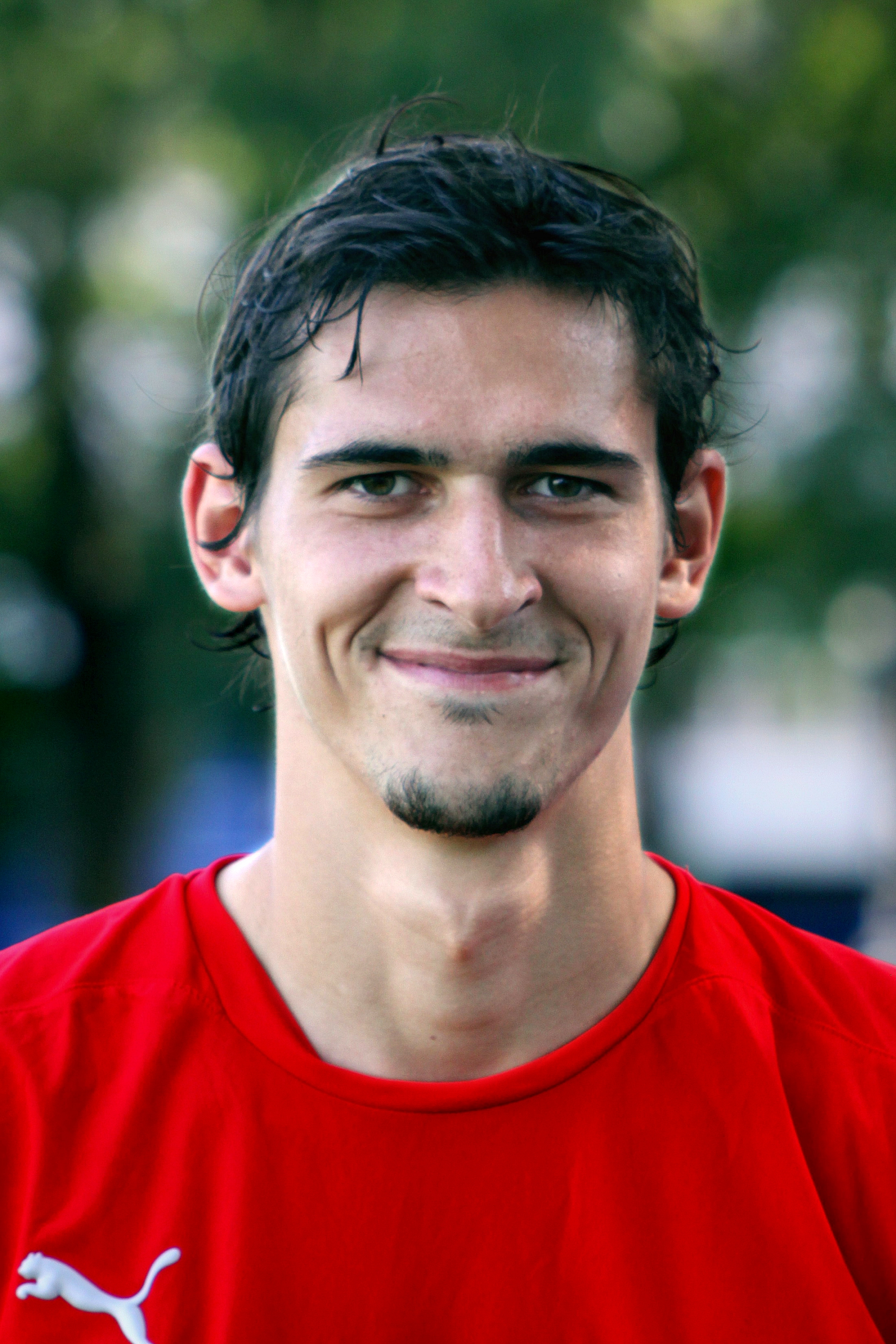

Personal information
- Date of birth: 25 October 1988 (age 38)
- Place of birth: Klagenfurt, Austria
- Height: 1.84 m (6 ft 1/2 in)
- Position: Defender

Team information
- Current team: Austria Klagenfurt
- Number: 25

Senior career*
Years	Team	Apps	(Gls)
2006–2007	Austria Karnten	1	(0)
2007–2008	FC Karnten	20	(1)
2008–2009	SV Grodig	27	(1)
2009–2012	Austria Wien	4	(0)
2012–2014	SC Wiener Neustadt	50	(1)
2014–	Austria Klagenfurt	48	(1)

International career^{‡}
	Austria U20	2	(0)
2009	Austria U21	5	(0)
- * Club domestic league appearances and goals as of 31 May 2016 ‡ National team caps and goals as of 31 May 2016

Manuel Wallner (born 25 October 1988) is an Austrian football defender who plays for Austria Klagenfurt.
