= Balakiyem Takougnadi =

Austrian footballer (born 1992)

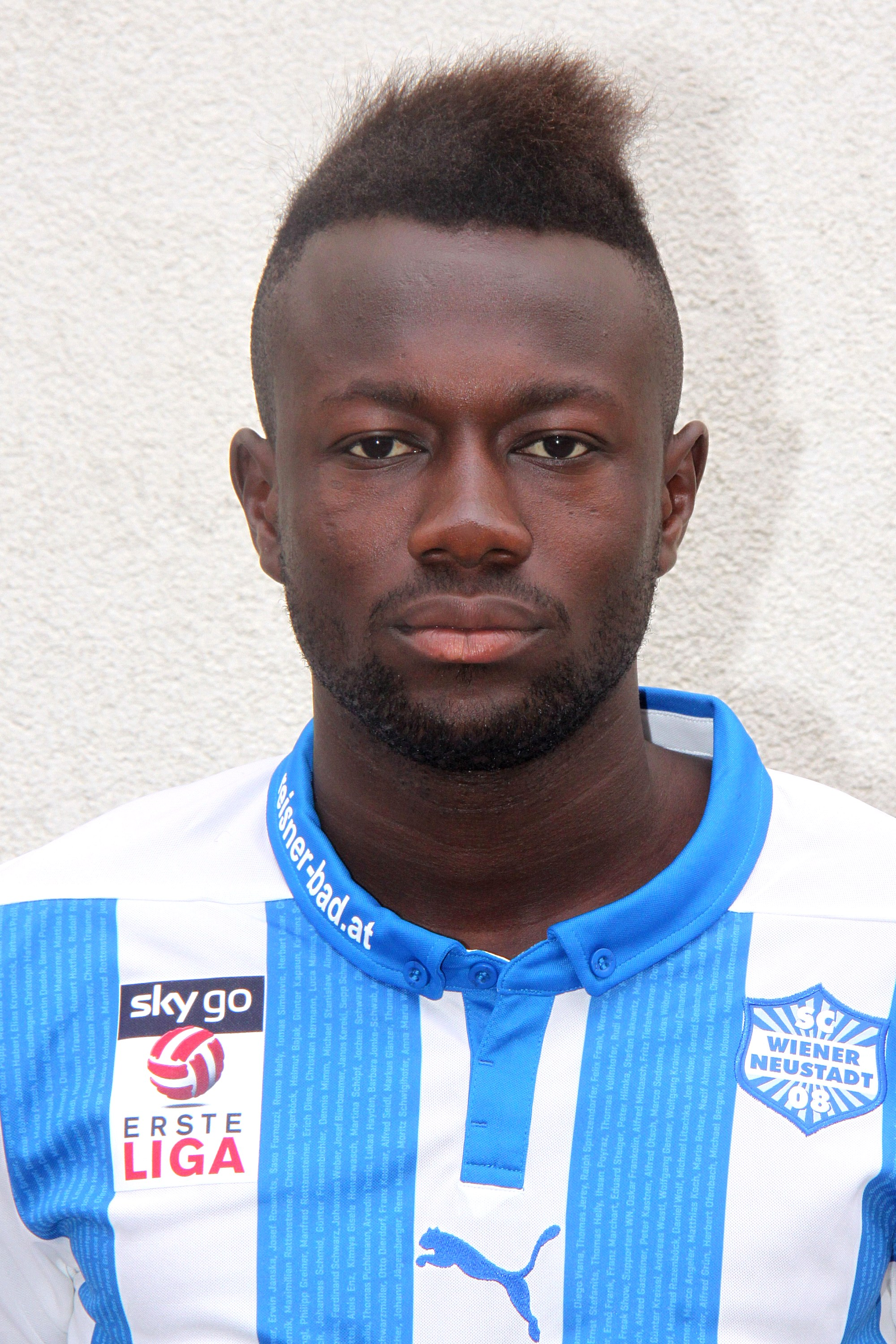

Personal information
- Full name: Gedeon Balakiyem Takougnadi
- Date of birth: 16 November 1992 (age 33)
- Place of birth: Lomé, Togo
- Height: 1.80 m (5 ft 11 in)
- Position: Midfielder

Youth career
- 1999–2009: Team Wiener Linien
- 2009–2010: FK Austria Wien

Senior career*
Years	Team	Apps	(Gls)
2010–2012	FK Austria Wien II	22	(0)
2012–2015	LASK Linz	71	(2)
2015–2016	SC Wiener Neustadt	26	(3)
2016–2017	SV Horn	25	(2)
2017–2021	SV Ried	59	(5)

International career
2010	Austria U19	2	(0)
- * Club domestic league appearances and goals as of 15 May 2021

Balakiyem Takougnadi (born 16 November 1992) is an Austrian footballer.

He has previously played for FK Austria Wien II, LASK Linz and SC Wiener Neustadt.

== Honours ==
=== Club ===
LASK Linz

- Austrian Regional League Central (2): 2012–13, 2013-14
