= Remo Mally =

Austrian footballer

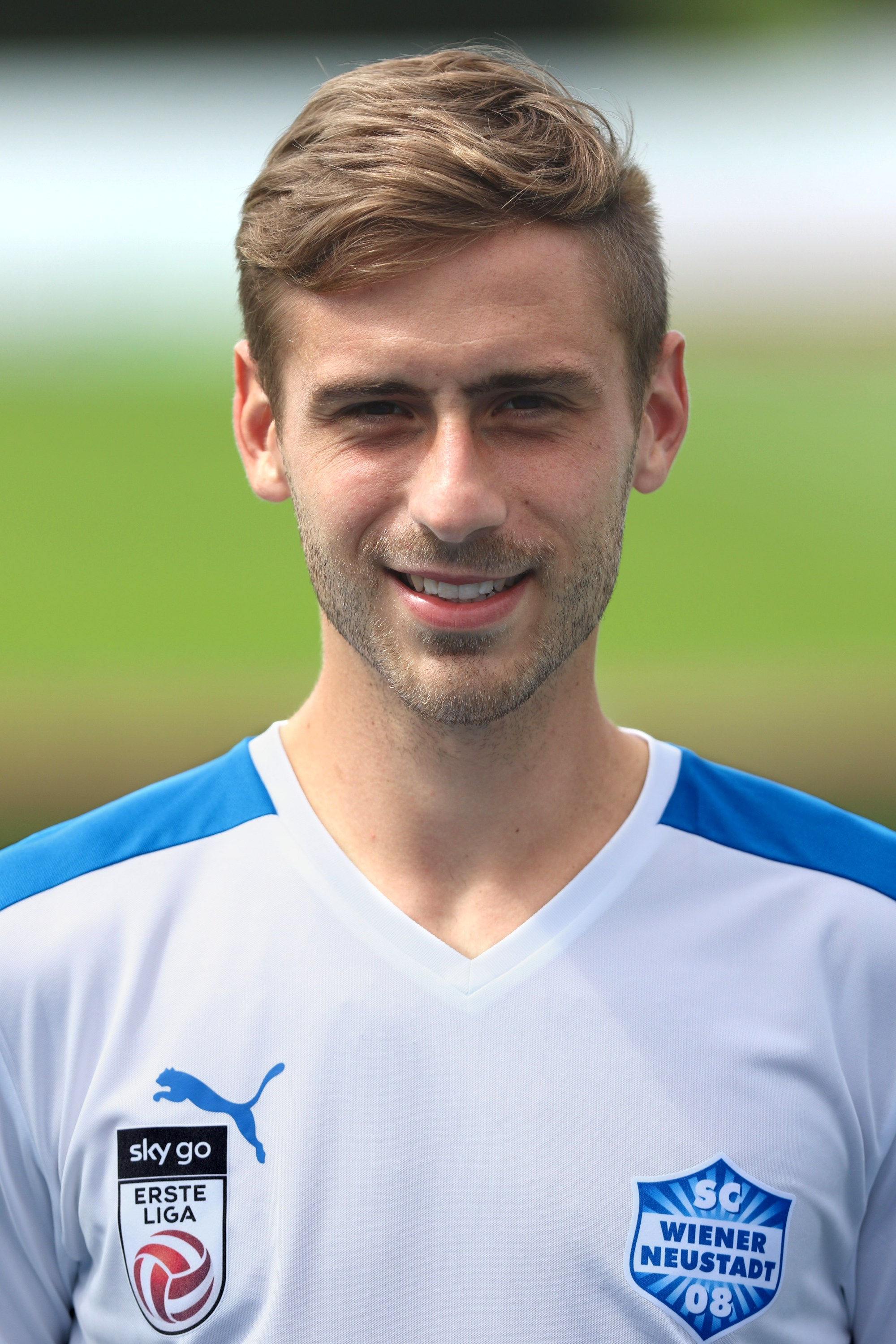

Personal information
- Full name: Remo Mally
- Date of birth: 24 March 1991 (age 35)
- Place of birth: Wagna, Austria
- Height: 1.84 m (6 ft 0 in)
- Position: Defender

Team information
- Current team: USV Mettersdorf
- Number: 5

Senior career*
Years	Team	Apps	(Gls)
2009–2013	Austria Wien II	65	(6)
2011–2013	Austria Wien	1	(0)
2013–2018	Wiener Neustadt	72	(2)
2018–	USV Mettersdorf		
- * Club domestic league appearances and goals as of 4 October 2018

Remo Mally (born 24 March 1991) is an Austrian footballer who plays as a defender for USV Mettersdorf.
