= Florian Mader =

Austrian footballer

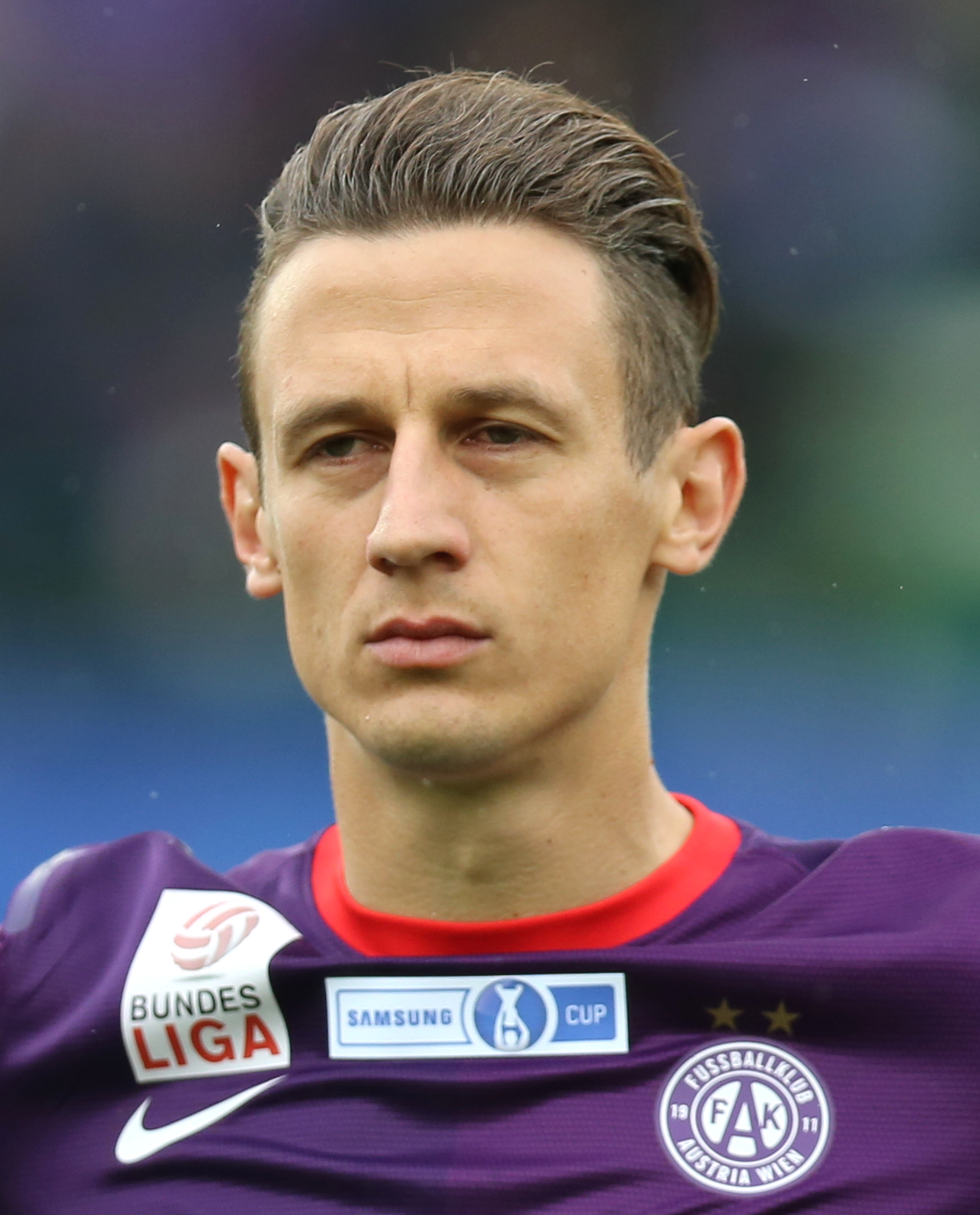

Personal information
- Full name: Florian Mader
- Date of birth: 14 September 1982 (age 44)
- Place of birth: Innsbruck, Austria
- Height: 1.80 m (5 ft 11 in)
- Position: Midfielder

Senior career*
| Years | Team | Apps | (Gls) |
| 2002–2003 | Wattens/Wacker | 23 | (5) |
| 2003–2008 | FC Wacker Tirol | 119 | (10) |
| 2005–2006 | → Rheindorf Altach (loan) | 13 | (3) |
| 2008–2011 | Ried | 91 | (5) |
| 2011–2015 | Austria Wien | 79 | (2) |
| 2015–2017 | SKN St. Pölten | 38 | (3) |
| 2017–2020 | WSG Swarovski Tirol | 57 | (4) |

International career
| 2005 | Austria U-23 | 2 | (0) |
- * Club domestic league appearances and goals

Florian Mader (born 14 September 1982) is an Austrian former professional association football player. He played as a midfielder.
