= Pascal Grünwald =

Austrian footballer

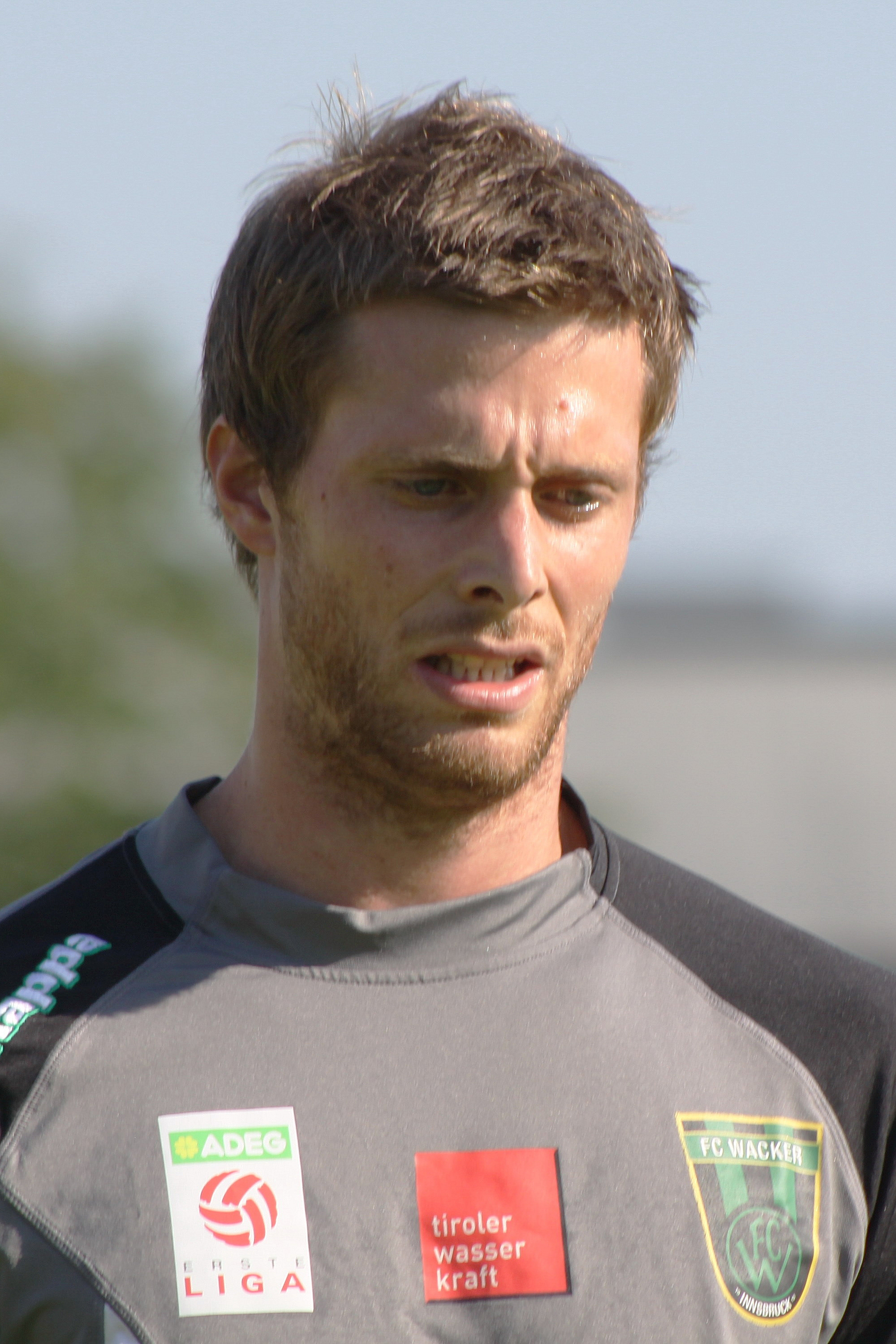

Personal information
- Date of birth: 13 November 1982 (age 43)
- Place of birth: Innsbruck, Austria
- Height: 1.88 m (6 ft 2 in)
- Position: Goalkeeper

Senior career*
Years	Team	Apps	(Gls)
2001–2002	WSG Wattens	10	(0)
2002–2003	Wattens-Wacker	18	(0)
2003–2006	SV Salzburg	10	(0)
2006–2007	FC Pasching	0	(0)
2007–2011	Wacker Innsbruck	98	(0)
2011–2014	Austria Wien	13	(0)
2014–2017	Wacker Innsbruck	69	(0)
2017–2020	WSG Swarovski Tirol	3	(0)

International career
2002–2003	Austria U21	2	(0)
2011	Austria	3	(0)
- * Club domestic league appearances and goals

Pascal Grünwald (born 13 November 1982) is an Austrian former footballer.
