= Tomáš Jun =

Czech former professional footballer

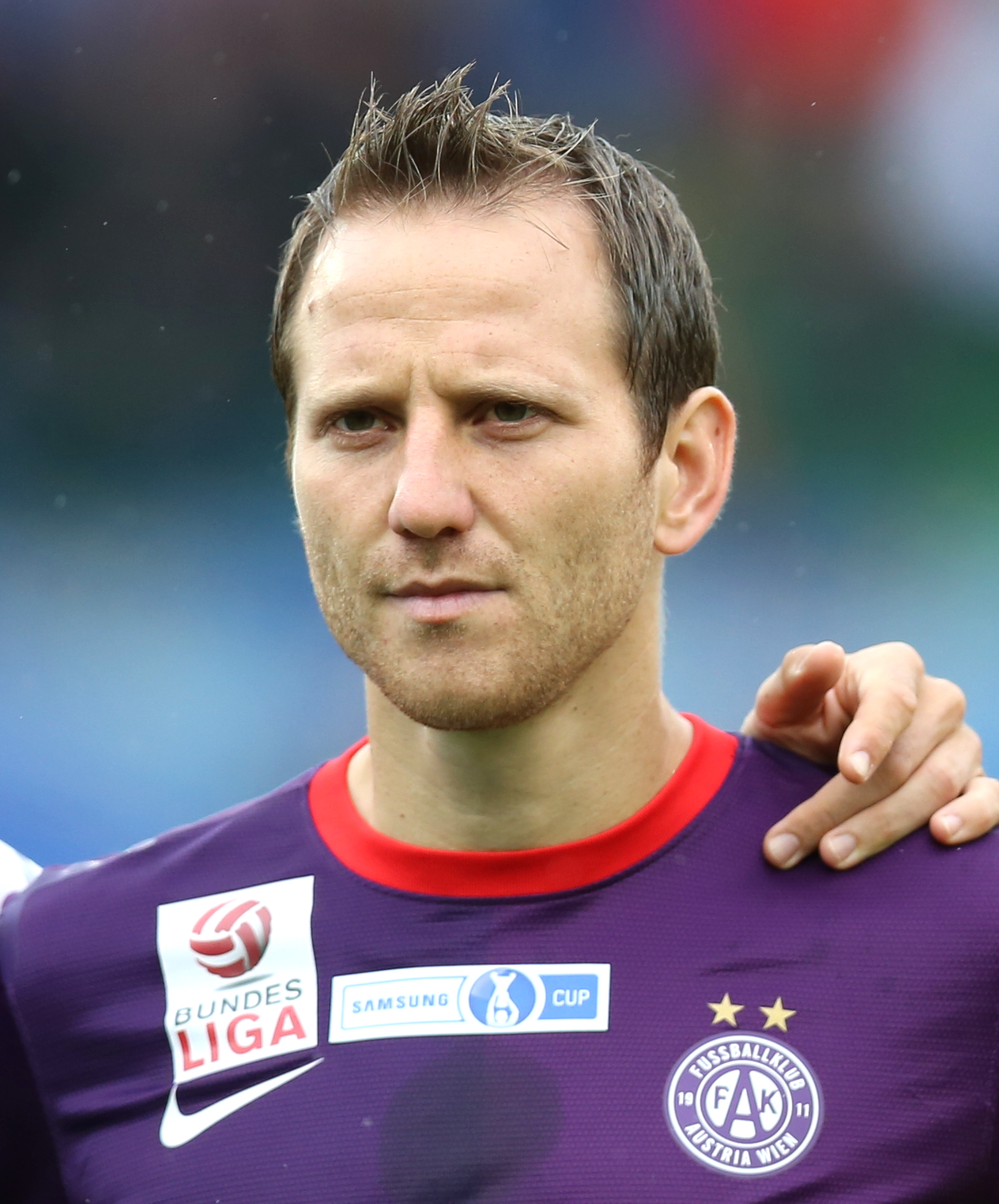
- Jun with Austria Wien in May 2013

Personal information
- Full name: Tomáš Jun
- Date of birth: 17 January 1983 (age 43)
- Place of birth: Prague, Czechoslovakia
- Height: 1.78 m (5 ft 10 in)
- Position: Striker

Youth career
- 1992–1999: Sparta Prague

Senior career*
Years	Team	Apps	(Gls)
1999–2005	Sparta Prague	95	(35)
2001–2002	→ Jablonec (loan)	7	(1)
2005	Trabzonspor	16	(0)
2005–2006	→ Beşiktaş (loan)	6	(1)
2006–2007	→ Sparta Prague (loan)	19	(1)
2008	→ Teplice (loan)	14	(4)
2008–2010	Teplice	14	(3)
2009	→ Rheindorf Altach (loan)	14	(8)
2009–2010	→ Austria Wien (loan)	21	(9)
2010–2014	Austria Wien	113	(23)
2014–2015	Jablonec	11	(1)
2015–2017	Ritzing	49	(17)
Total		379	(103)

International career
1998	Czech Republic U-15	5	(5)
1999–2000	Czech Republic U-16	22	(19)
1999–2001	Czech Republic U-17	6	(7)
2000–2001	Czech Republic U-18	8	(2)
2001–2002	Czech Republic U-19	6	(5)
2001	Czech Republic U-20	6	(2)
2002–2004	Czech Republic U-21	21	(3)
2004–2006	Czech Republic	10	(2)
Medal record
Men's football
Representing Czech Republic
UEFA European Under-21 Championship
Winner	2002 Switzerland
UEFA European Under-17 Championship
Runner-up	2000 Israel
- * Club domestic league appearances and goals

Tomáš Jun (born 17 January 1983) is a Czech former professional footballer who played as a striker. Mainly playing in his native Czech Republic, where he was part of the Sparta Prague team which won the Czech First League four times between 1999 and 2005, Jun also spent time playing club football in Turkey and Austria. He was the Czech First League's top scorer in the 2004–05 season. At international level Jun scored 2 goals in 10 appearances for the Czech Republic.

== Career ==
=== Sparta Prague ===
Jun joined AC Sparta Prague's youth system as a nine-year-old in 1992. Progressing through the club's youth teams he made his senior debut aged just 16. Only a year later he was in the starting formation in Sparta's Champions League clash with Arsenal. He also became an important member of the national youth team. By 2001 his first team opportunities became more restricted and he was loaned out to FK Jablonec 97. After a few months at Jablonec he was recalled by Sparta Prague and managed to score a few important goals for the team. The next season saw Jun being given more first team chances, but he was still restricted to just 19 league appearances. In the 2002–03 season the youngster featured on a more regular basis with a decent tally of 8 goals. After a change in management in the 2004–05 season he hit his best form yet becoming Sparta's and the Czech First League's top scorer with 14 goals in 30 appearances, helping Sparta Prague regain the league title.

=== Trabzonspor ===
His great season at Sparta had raised his profile, and not only did he break into the national team but a number of foreign clubs became interested in signing the promising young striker. In the end he moved to Turkish team Trabzonspor in 2005 for a €3.25 million transfer fee, signing a five-year deal with the Süper Lig outfit. The excitement of his transfer was short-lived, however, as he failed to make an impact, moving to Beşiktaş J.K. on loan after only a few months without having scored a single goal for Trabzonspor. His luck at Beşiktaş was not much better as he spent most of his time as a substitute, only finding the net once.

In the 2006–07 season Jun returned to Sparta Prague on a season-long loan, hoping to regain his previous goal scoring form after a bad run in the Süper Lig, but even there he was mainly used a late substitute, resulting in him managing to score only one league goal. He was called back to Trabzonspor main squad for 2007/08 season by trainer Ziya Dogan after the loss of explosive striker Ersen Martin to injury, but did not feature.

=== Teplice ===
In January 2008 Jun was again on his way back to the Czech First League, this time joining FK Teplice on loan. After six months in the league, where he netted 4 goals in 14 league appearances, Teplice made his loan move permanent. He continued in similar form in the next six months, scoring 3 times in 14 appearances.

In January 2009 he left FK Teplice on a six-month loan move to Austrian Bundesliga side SCR Altach. His form seems to be recovering as he grabbed 8 goals in just 14 appearances for the club. Unfortunately despite this good run for the team he was unable to save them from relegation.

=== Austria Wien ===
Jun returned to the Austrian Bundesliga for the 2009–10 season on a season-long loan with FK Austria Wien and immediately made an impact, scoring no fewer than nine times during the first two months of the season in the league as well as the Austrian Cup (hat-trick against FAC in the second round) and the UEFA Europa League.

On 4 October 2009, Jun once again scored the winner against SV Mattersburg. It was to be his last appearance for Austria Wien for a couple of months as he was diagnosed with a cruciate ligament rupture, sustained after a foul in the same match.

With the expected pause for an injury like this no less than six months, Jun surprised everyone by making a speedy recovery, already being fit for a short comeback against Red Bull Salzburg on 21 March 2010. In the following weeks, he quickly regained his form, scoring his first goal after the pause against SV Mattersburg, after giving the assist for Austria Wien's winning goal in Ried just one week after his comeback. He went on to score four times until the end of the 2009–10 season, making him second-best goal-scorer after Milenko Ačimovič with a total of nine goals and ten assists.

As a result of this good first season, Austria Wien made the loan deal with FK Teplice permanent on 14 May 2010, just one day after the season finale, with Jun's new contract running until 2012.

A torn hamstring from which he never had the chance to fully recover hindered Jun's first half of the season. Nevertheless, he scored once in Austria Wien's 3–1 away win at Ruch Chorzów in the third round of the Europa League qualification and (league, cup and Europa league combined) as of February 2011, lead his club's assists statistic with eleven assists. As well as his incomplete pre-season, Jun sustained a further serious injury in training in October 2010, a ruptured ligament in his ankle keeping him on the sidelines for another six weeks. At the time of writing, he considers himself being "injury and pain - free" for the first time in months and with the second half of the Austrian League season starting soon, Jun could once again prove a valuable asset to Austria Wiens campaign for a 21st title / 28th win in the cup. He left the club after five years there, in the spring of 2014.

== International career ==
Jun won silver at the 2000 UEFA under-17 European Championship and scored seven goals in the tournament. He also helped them to win the 2002 UEFA under-21 European Championship. In February that season, he scored his first goal for the full national team. Jun's most important goal of his career came in the final group match of 2006 FIFA World Cup qualification, scoring the first goal against Finland as a starting replacement for the injured Jan Koller and Vratislav Lokvenc. The win allowed the Czech Republic to advance to the playoff stage against Norway. In summer 2005 he joined Trabzonspor of Turkey but failed to score a single goal. He struggled to make even substitute appearances at Beşiktaş, which has led to his omission from the Czech Republic squad for the 2006 World Cup.

== Honours ==
=== Club ===
Beşiktaş

- Turkish Cup: 2005–06
