= Manuel Ortlechner =

Austrian footballer

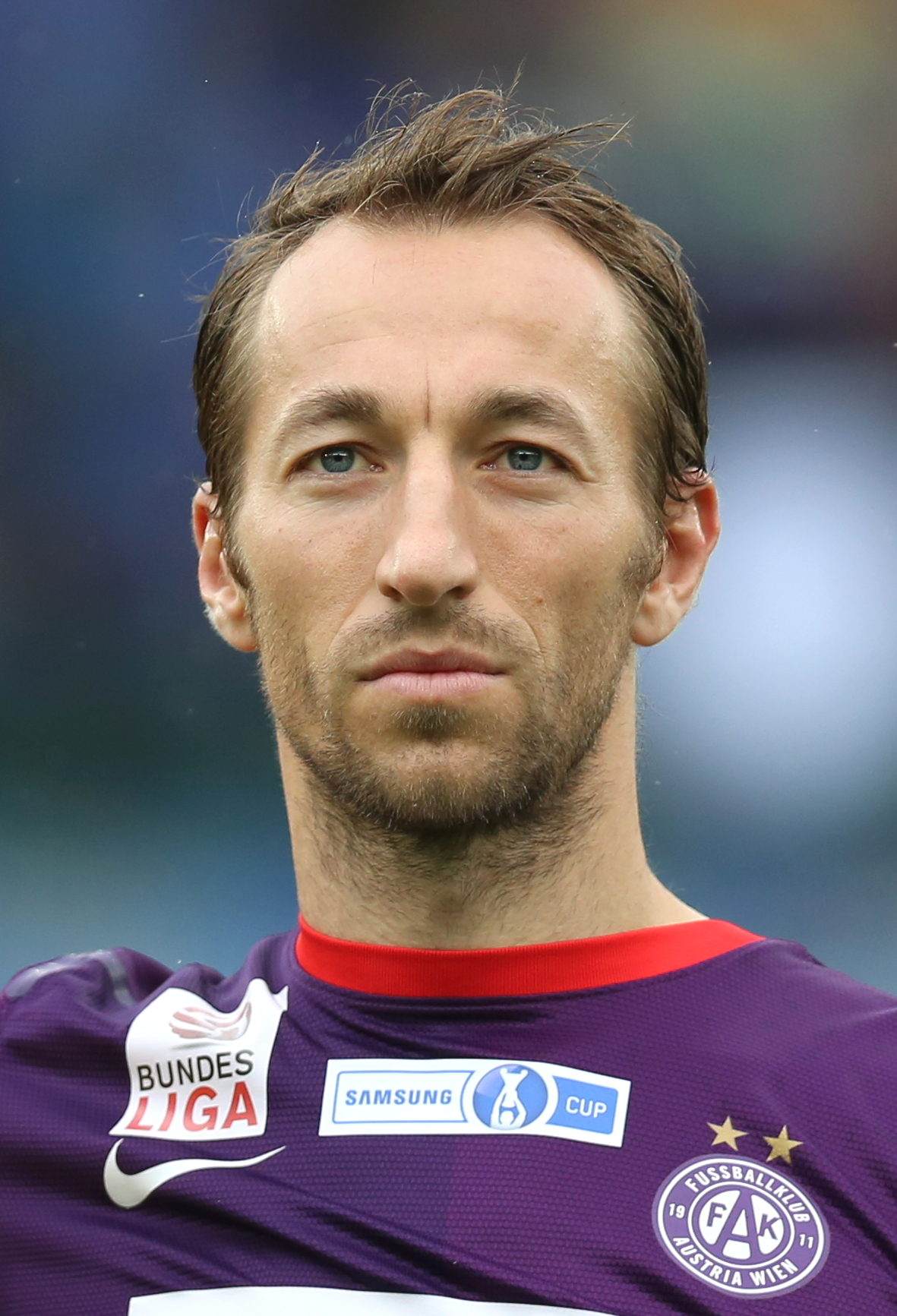
- Ortlechner with FK Austria Wien in 2013

Personal information
- Date of birth: March 4, 1980 (age 46)
- Place of birth: Ried, Austria
- Height: 1.86 m (6 ft 1 in)
- Position: Full back

Youth career
- 1986–1996: TSV Ort
- 1996–1999: SV Ried

Senior career*
Years	Team	Apps	(Gls)
1999–2004	SV Ried	105	(2)
2004–2007	SV Pasching	79	(0)
2007–2009	SK Austria Kärnten	66	(3)
2009–2015	FK Austria Wien	155	(8)
2015–2017	FK Austria Wien II	35	(1)

International career
	Austria U-18	2	(0)
	Austria U-21	9	(0)
2006–2013	Austria	9	(0)
- * Club domestic league appearances and goals

Manuel Ortlechner (born 4 March 1980) is a former Austrian footballer. He previously played for SK Austria Kärnten, SV Pasching, SV Ried and for youth teams of TSV Ort. He was a member of the Austria national football team.

== Coaching career ==
On 17 June 2015, Ortlechner became a player–coach for Austria Wien. He signed a playing contract for the reserve team and is also an assistant coach for the club's under–14 team.
