= 2018–19 SK Sturm Graz season =

Sturm Graz
2018–19 season
- Manager: Heiko Vogel
- Stadium: Merkur-Arena
- Bundesliga: —
- Austrian Cup: Second round
- Champions League: Second qualifying round
- Europa League: Third qualifying round

The 2018–19 SK Sturm Graz season started on 21 July 2018 in the Austrian Cup against Siegendorf.

== Bundesliga ==
=== Bundesliga review ===
==== July and August ====
Sturm Graz opened their Bundesliga campaign against TSV Hartberg on 28 July 2018. Sturm Graz won the match 3–2. Lukas Spendlhofer, Markus Pink, and Philipp Hosiner scored for Sturm Graz. Tasos Avlonitis scored an own goal and Dario Tadić scored for Hartsberg. Matchday two took place on 4 August 2018 against Wacker Innsbruck. Sturm Graz won the match 3–2. Sturm Graz got two goals from Lukas Grozurek and a goal from Markus Pink. Martin Harrer scored two goals for Wacker Innsbruck. Matchday three happened on 12 August 2018. SKN St. Pölten won the match 2–0 with goals from Daniel Luxbacher and Taxiarchis Fountas.

=== Results summary ===
Overall								Home						Away					
Pld	W	D	L	GF	GA	GD	Pts	W	D	L	GF	GA	GD	W	D	L	GF	GA	GD
4	2	1	1	7	7	0	7	1	1	0	4	3	+1	1	0	1	3	4	−1

Last updated: 19 August 2018.

=== Bundesliga results ===
28 July 2018 1	Sturm Graz	3–2	Hartberg	Graz
17:00	Obermair (yellow card) 1'; Spendlhofer 19'; Pink 25'; Filipe Ferreira (yellow card) 45+2'; Hierländer (yellow card) 80'; Hosiner 82'	Summary	Avlonitis 6' (o.g.); Tadić 47'; Ljubic (yellow card) 90+5'	Stadium: Merkur-Arena; Attendance: 10,952; Referee: René Eisner

4 August 2018 2	Wacker Innsbruck	2–3	Sturm Graz	Innsbruck
17:00	Vallci (yellow card) 58'; Harrer 77' 84'; Rakowitz (yellow card) 80'	Summary	Grozurek 21' 60'; Pink 56'; Eze (yellow card) 90+2'	Stadium: Tivoli Stadion Tirol; Attendance: 7,820; Referee: Markus Hameter

12 August 2018 3	St. Pölten	2–0	Sturm Graz	Sankt Pölten
17:00	Luxbacher 12' (yellow card) 52'; Fountas 86'	Summary	Spendlhofer (yellow card) 28'; Koch (yellow card) 66'; Žulj (yellow card) 77'; Hosiner (yellow card) 90+3'	Stadium: NV Arena; Attendance: 3,330; Referee: Harald Lechner

19 August 2018 4	Sturm Graz	1–1	Rheindorf Altach	Graz
17:00	Grozurek 38'	Summary	Gouet (yellow card) 47' (yellow-red card) 90+3'; Aigner (yellow card) 70'; Dobras 77'	Stadium: Merkur-Arena; Attendance: 8,531; Referee: Andreas Heiß

25 August 2018 5	Wolfsberger AC	1–1	Sturm Graz	Wolfsberg
17:00	Schmerböck 42'; Orgill (yellow card) 83'	Summary	Pink 48'; Žulj (yellow card) 67'	Stadium: Lavanttal-Arena; Attendance: 5,323; Referee: Christopher Jäger

2 September 2018 6	Sturm Graz	1–1	Rapid Wien	Graz
17:00	Žulj 37' (pen.); Maresic (yellow card) 43'	Summary	Schwab (yellow card) 25'; Alar 78'; Auer (yellow card) 87'	Stadium: Merkur-Arena; Attendance: 14,7668; Referee: Manuel Schüttengruber

15 September 2018 7	Admira	2–3	Sturm Graz	Maria Enzersdorf
17:00	Paintsil 24'; Soiri 58'; Jakoliš (yellow card) 65' (yellow-red card) 66'; Maier (yellow card) 88'	Summary	Žulj 12'; Avlonitis (yellow card) 53'; Hosiner 72'; Lackner 86'; Grozurek (yellow card) 89'	Stadium: BSFZ-Arena; Attendance: 2,588; Referee: Dieter Muckenhammer

22 September 2018 8	Sturm Graz	1–2	Mattersburg	Graz
17:00	Spendlhofer 12'	Summary	Pušić 10' (yellow card) 76'; Renner 60' (yellow card) 62'; Kerschbaumer (yellow card) 64'; Höller (yellow card) 88'; Mahrer (red card) 90'; Jefté Betancor (yellow card) 90+3'	Stadium: Merkur-Arena; Attendance: 9,650; Referee: Sebastian Gishamer

30 September 2018 9	LASK	0–0	Sturm Graz	Pasching
17:00	Ranftl (yellow card) 62'	Summary	Avlonitis (yellow card) 59'; Hierländer (yellow card) 90'	Stadium: TGW Arena; Attendance: 5,538; Referee: Harald Lechner

7 October 2018 10	Sturm Graz	1–2	Salzburg	Graz
17:00	Žulj 43'	Summary	Gulbrandsen 28'; Daka (yellow card) 42'; Lainer 53'; Samassékou (yellow card) 77'; Stankovic (yellow card) 90+5'	Stadium: Merkur-Arena; Attendance: 12,595; Referee: Julian Weinberger

21 October 2018 11	Austria Wien	1–1	Sturm Graz	Vienna
17:00	Cuevas (yellow card) 32'; Friesenbichler 48'	Summary	Žulj 8'; Hierländer (yellow card) 25' (yellow-red card) 61'; Koch (yellow card) 39'; Spendlhofer (yellow card) 79'	Stadium: Franz Horr Stadium; Attendance: 11,061; Referee: Manuel Schüttengruber

27 October 2018 12	Hartberg	2–0	Sturm Graz	Hartberg
17:00	Rep 57' (yellow card) 66' (goal) 89'; Sittsam (yellow card) 60'; Rasswalder (yellow card) 63'; Ljubic (yellow card) 78'	Summary	Žulj (yellow card) 80'; Kiteishvili (yellow card) 90+2'	Stadium: Profertil Arena Hartberg; Attendance: 5,149; Referee: Markus Hameter

3 November 2018 13	Sturm Graz	1–1	Wacker Innsbruck	Graz
17:00	Maresic (yellow card) 26'; Koch 52' (yellow card) 55'	Summary	Henning (yellow card) 29'; Dedić 72'	Stadium: Merkur-Arena; Attendance: 9,585; Referee: Dominik Ouschan

10 November 2018 14	Sturm Graz	0–0	St. Pölten	Graz
17:00	Pink (yellow card) 17'; Maresic (red card) 26'; Eze (yellow card) 45+3'; Žulj (yellow card) 49'; Lackner (yellow card) 77'	Summary	Luxbacher (yellow card) 13'; Rasner (yellow card) 51'; Luan (yellow card) 70'	Stadium: Merkur-Arena; Attendance: 10,624; Referee: Andreas Heiß

25 November 2018 15	Rheindorf Altach	0–2	Sturm Graz	Altach
14:30	Dobras (yellow card) 41'; Karic (yellow card) 90+2'	Summary	Eze 19'; Avlonitis (yellow card) 23'; Žulj (yellow card) 42'; Grozurek 90+3'	Stadium: CASHPOINT Arena; Attendance: 3,876; Referee: Harald Lechner

2 December 2018 16	Sturm Graz	3–0	Wolfsberger AC	Graz
17:00	Eze 45'; Lema 85'; Kiteishvili 88'	Summary	Solbauer (red card) 57'; Rnić (yellow card) 60'; Orgill (yellow card) 90+4'	Stadium: Merkur-Arena; Attendance: 10,197; Referee: Gerhard Grobelnik

9 December 2018 17	Rapid Wien	0–0	Sturm Graz	Wien
17:00	Schwab (yellow card) 38'; Martic (yellow card) 60'; Murg (yellow card) 90+4'	Summary	Žulj (yellow card) 12'; Lovrić (yellow card) 47'; Hierländer (yellow card) 78'	Stadium: Allianz Stadion; Attendance: 17,114; Referee: Robert Schörgenhofer

15 December 2018 18	Sturm Graz	3–0	Admira	Graz
17:00	Koch 64'; Žulj 73'; Hosiner 90+3'	Summary	Hjulmand (yellow card) 33'	Stadium: Merkur-Arena; Attendance: 9,149; Referee: Dieter Muckenhammer

24 February 2019 19	Mattersburg	v	Sturm Graz	Mattersburg
14:30				Stadium: Pappelstadion

== Austrian Cup ==
=== Austrian Cup review ===
Sturm Graz opened up their 2018–19 season in the first round of the Austrian Cup against Siegendorf. Sturm Graz won the match 2–0 with goals from Markus Pink and Stefan Hierländer.

=== Austrian Cup results ===
Rd	Date	H/A	Opponent	Res. F–A	Goalscorers		Ref.
Rd	Date	H/A	Opponent	Res. F–A	Sturm Graz	Opponent	Ref.
1	21 Jul.	A	Siegendorf	2–0	Pink 25'; Hierländer 51'	—	

== Europe ==
=== European review ===
Sturm Graz were drawn against AFC Ajax in the second qualifying round draw. On 25 July 2018, Ajax won the first leg 2–0 with goals from Hakim Ziyech and Lasse Schöne. Ajax won 3–1 in the second leg on 1 August 2018 and 5–1 on aggregate. André Onana scored an own goal for Sturm Graz. Ajax got two goals from Klaas-Jan Huntelaar and a goal from Dušan Tadić.

Sturm Graz entered the third qualifying round of the Europa League after losing 5–1 on aggregate to Ajax in the second qualifying round of Champions League. Sturm Graz were drawn against the winner of the AEK Larnaca–Dundalk tie. AEK Larnaca won the tie 4–0 on aggregate. AEK Larnaca won the first leg 2–0 with goals from Joan Guillem Truyols and Ivan Tričkovski. Stefan Hierländer was sent–off during the match. An assistant referee was hit by a mug during the match. In the second leg, AEK Larnaca won the match 5–0 with three goals from Ivan Tričkovski and a goal from the penalty mark from Jorge Larena and a goal from Florian Taulemesse. With the loss, Sturm Graz were knocked out of the Europa League 7–0 on aggregate.

=== European results ===
Leg	Date	H/A	Opponent	Res. F–A	Agg. score F–A	Goalscorers		Ref.
Leg	Date	H/A	Opponent	Res. F–A	Agg. score F–A	Sturm Graz	Opponent	Ref.
UEFA Champions League Second qualifying round
FL	25 Jul.	A	Ajax	0–2	—	—	Ziyech 15'; Schöne 57'	
SL	1 Aug.	H	Ajax	1–3	1–5	Onana 89' (o.g.)	Huntelaar 39', 77'; Tadić 48'	
UEFA Europa League Third qualifying round
FL	9 Aug.	H	AEK Larnaca	0–2	—	—	Truyols 46'; Tričkovski 74'	
SL	16 Aug.	A	AEK Larnaca	0–5	0–7	—	Tričkovski 8', 67', 80'; Larena 65' (pen.); Taulemesse 86'	
