= 2012–13 Austrian Cup =

2012–13 Austrian FA Cup
ÖFB Cup (German)

Tournament details
- Country: Austria
- Teams: 64

Final positions
- Champions: FC Pasching
- Runners-up: Austria Vienna

Tournament statistics
- Top goal scorer: Rubén Rivera (6)

The 2012–13 Austrian Cup (German: ÖFB-Samsung-Cup) was the 79th season of Austria's nationwide football cup competition. It commenced with the matches of the First Round on 12 July 2012 and concluded with the Final on 30 May 2013. This year the tournament took place with only 64 participants, which abolishes the preliminary rounds. This year reserve teams were not allowed to participate in the competition.

== Participating teams ==
The teams of the Bundesliga and the First League, the two losers of the First League Relegation Playoff and the winner of the 9 winner of the province cups. Also there were lower league teams, nominated by the 9 province-FAs.

Austrian Bundesliga	First League	Regionalliga	Regionalliga	Landesliga	Landes-Cup-Winners
Red Bull Salzburg; Rapid Wien; Admira Wacker Mödling; Austria Wien; Sturm Graz; Ried; Wacker Innsbruck; Mattersburg; Wiener Neustadt; Wolfsberg	Kapfenberg; Rheindorf Altach; Austria Lustenau; St. Pölten; Blau-Weiß Linz; Grödig; First Vienna; Lustenau; Hartberg; Horn	Swarovski Wattens; GAK; Parndorf; Stegersbach; SAK Klagenfurt; Austria Klagenfurt; Villach; Sollenau; Amstetten; Pasching; LASK Linz; Union St. Florian	Union Vöcklamarkt; Pinzgau Saalfelden; St. Johann; Leoben; Gratkorn; Allerheiligen; Hard; Bregenz; FAC; Schwechat; Wiener Sport-Club	Oberwart; Bad Vöslau; Retz; Ardagger; Gaflenz; Wallern; Salzburger AK; Kalsdorf; Schwaz; Reutte; Wolfurt; Ostbahn	Heiligenkreuz; Spittal/Drau; Rohrendorf; Grün-Weiß Micheldorf; Austria Salzburg; Deutschlandsberger SC; Kufstein; Dornbirn; Wiener Viktoria

== Schedule ==
- First Round: 13–15 July 2012
- Second Round: 25–26 September 2012
- Thhird Round: 30–31 October 2012
- Quarterfinals: 16–17 April 2013
- Semifinals: 7–8 May 2013
- Final: 30 May 2013

== First round ==
The draw for this round was on 1 July 2012. The matches took place from 13 to 15 July 2012.

Team 1	Score	Team 2
12 July 2012
FAC	0–1	Rheindorf Altach
13 July 2012
Hard	1–0	Schwaz
Parndorf	0–3	Admira Wacker Mödling
Swarovski Wattens	0–1	Sturm Graz
Union Vöcklamarkt	3–4	Lustenau
Gratkorn	0–0 (a.e.t.) (4–5 p)	Wacker Innsbruck
Villach	4–2	Rohrendorf
Pasching	2–1	Austria Salzburg
Kalsdorf	3–1	Wallern
Deutschlandsberger SC	1–2	Hartberg
Pinzgau Saalfelden	0–4	Grödig
Union St. Florian	2–1	Blau-Weiß Linz
Austria Klagenfurt	3–2	Horn
Salzburger AK	0–5	Allerheiligen
Amstetten	0–1	Schwechat
GAK	3–2 (a.e.t.)	First Vienna
Wiener Sport-Club	0–2	Red Bull Salzburg
14 July 2012
Bad Vöslau	1–0	St. Pölten
Stegersbach	3–2 (a.e.t.)	Reutte
Grün-Weiß Micheldorf	0–1	Wiener Viktoria
SAK Klagenfurt	1–2	St. Johann
Oberwart	1–3	Austria Wien
Leoben	1–3	Mattersburg
Retz	1–7	Austria Lustenau
LASK Linz	7–0	Spittal/Drau
Gaflenz	1–2	Sollenau
Ostbahn	1–8	Wolfsberg
Bregenz	1–2	Kapfenberg
Kufstein	1–4	Ried
Ardagger	2–3 (a.e.t.)	Dornbirn
15 July 2012
Wolfurt	2–4 (a.e.t.)	Wiener Neustadt
Heiligenkreuz	0–5	Rapid Wien

== Second round ==
The draw for this round was on 13 August 2012. The matches took place on 25 and 26 September 2012.

Team 1	Score	Team 2
25 September 2012
Kalsdorf	3–0	Hartberg
Wiener Viktoria	3–3 (a.e.t.) (4–1 p)	Kapfenberg
Hard	0–3	Rheindorf Altach
Stegersbach	1–3	Red Bull Salzburg
Austria Klagenfurt	2–0 (a.e.t.)	Admira Wacker Mödling
Villach	3–1	Wiener Neustadt
Pasching	3–2 (a.e.t.)	Austria Lustenau
Schwechat	0–5	Sturm Graz
Sollenau	1–5 (a.e.t.)	Wacker Innsbruck
St. Johann	0–3	Lustenau
LASK Linz	2–0	Grödig
Dornbirn	2–3	Austria Wien
26 September 2012
Bad Vöslau	2–3	Mattersburg
Union St. Florian	1–1 (a.e.t.) (4–5 p)	Ried
Allerheiligen	1–4	Rapid Wien
GAK	0–6	Wolfsberg

== Third round ==
The draw for this round was on 2 October 2012. The matches took place on 30 and 31 October 2012.

Team 1	Score	Team 2
30 October 2012
Pasching	2–1	Austria Klagenfurt
Sturm Graz	1–2	Wacker Innsbruck
Lustenau	1–2	Wolfsberg
LASK Linz	2–2 (a.e.t.) (7–6 p)	Mattersburg
Wiener Viktoria	0–1	Ried
31 October 2012
Kalsdorf	1–3	Red Bull Salzburg
Villach	0–4	Austria Wien
Rapid Wien	4–2 (a.e.t.)	Rheindorf Altach

== Quarter-finals ==
The matches took place on 16 and 17 April 2013.

16 April 2013	Rapid Wien	0–1	Pasching	Vienna
18:00		Report	Casanova 61'	Stadium: Gerhard-Hanappi-Stadion; Attendance: 3,450; Referee: Andreas Kollegger

16 April 2013	Wacker Innsbruck	0–3	Red Bull Salzburg	Innsbruck
20:30		Report	Soriano 44', 89'; Ilsanker 53'	Stadium: Tivoli-Neu; Attendance: 1,512; Referee: Alexander Harkam

17 April 2013	Wolfsberg	1–2	Austria Wien	Wolfsberg
18:00	Rivera 83'	Report	Hosiner 20'; A. Grünwald 67'	Stadium: Lavanttal-Arena; Attendance: 4,500; Referee: Markus Hameter

17 April 2013	SV Ried	2–1 (a.e.t.)	LASK Linz	Ried
20:30	Žulj 41'; Meilinger 106'	Report	Vujanović 90+4'	Stadium: Keine Sorgen Arena; Attendance: 6,800; Referee: Manfred Krassnitzer

== Semi-finals ==
The matches took place on 7 and 8 May 2013.

7 May 2013	Red Bull Salzburg	1–2	Pasching	Salzburg
18:00	Nielsen 48'		Kovačec 69'; Kerschbaumer 79'	Stadium: Red Bull Arena; Attendance: 2,763; Referee: Gerhard Grobelnik

8 May 2013	SV Ried	1–3	Austria Wien	Ried
20:30	Gartler 75'		Hosiner 52'; Jun 85'; Gorgon 90+1'	Stadium: Keine Sorgen Arena; Attendance: 4,903; Referee: Robert Schörgenhofer

== Final ==
30 May 2013
16:30 CEST

Austria Wien	0–1	Pasching
	Report	Sobkova 47'

Ernst-Happel-Stadion, Vienna
Attendance: 16,500
Referee: Rene Eisner

GK	13	(Austria) Heinz Lindner
RB	30	(Austria) Fabian Koch	(substituted on) 78'
CB	4	(Croatia) Kaja Rogulj	(yellow card) 58'
CB	14	(Austria) Manuel Ortlechner (c)
LB	27	(Austria) Emir Dilaver
CM	25	(Australia) James Holland	(yellow card) 63'
CM	10	(Austria) Alexander Grünwald	(substituted on) 65'
CM	17	(Hungary) Florian Mader	(substituted on) 54'
RW	20	(Austria) Alexander Gorgon
FW	16	(Austria) Philipp Hosiner
LW	11	(Czech Republic) Tomáš Jun
Substitutes:
GK	1	(Austria) Pascal Grünwald
CB	5	(Austria) Lukas Rotpuller
CM	8	(Austria) Tomáš Šimkovič	(substituted on) 54'	(yellow card) 90+3'
CM	19	(Austria) Marko Stanković	(substituted on) 78'
FW	42	(Austria) Roman Kienast	(substituted on) 65'
Manager:
(Austria) Peter Stöger

GK	23	(Austria) Hans-Peter Berger
RB	6	(Austria) Daniel Kerschbaumer	(yellow card) 84'
CB	15	(Austria) Martin Grasegger
CB	21	(Croatia) Davorin Kablar (c)
LB	5	(Austria) Mark Prettenthaler	(yellow card) 41'
CM	16	(Austria) Thomas Krammer	(yellow card) 6'	(substituted off) 81'
CM	13	(Austria) Marco Perchtold
CM	17	(Austria) Daniel Sobkova	47'	(substituted off) 79'
RM	22	(Austria) Philipp Schobesberger	(substituted off) 70'
LM	20	(Croatia) Ivan Kovačec
FW	11	(Spain) Nacho Casanova
Substitutes:
GK	1	(Austria) Michael Höfler
RM	19	(Croatia) Stefan Petrović	(substituted on) 79'
CM	18	(Austria) Markus Blutsch
CM	8	(Austria) Ali Hamdemir	(substituted on) 70'
FW	9	(Austria) Lukas Mössner	(substituted on) 81'
Manager: (Austria) Gerald Baumgartner

Match rules

- 90 minutes.
- 30 minutes of extra time if necessary.
- Penalty shoot-out if scores still level.
- Five named substitutes, of which up to three may be used.
