= Philipp Hosiner =

Austrian footballer

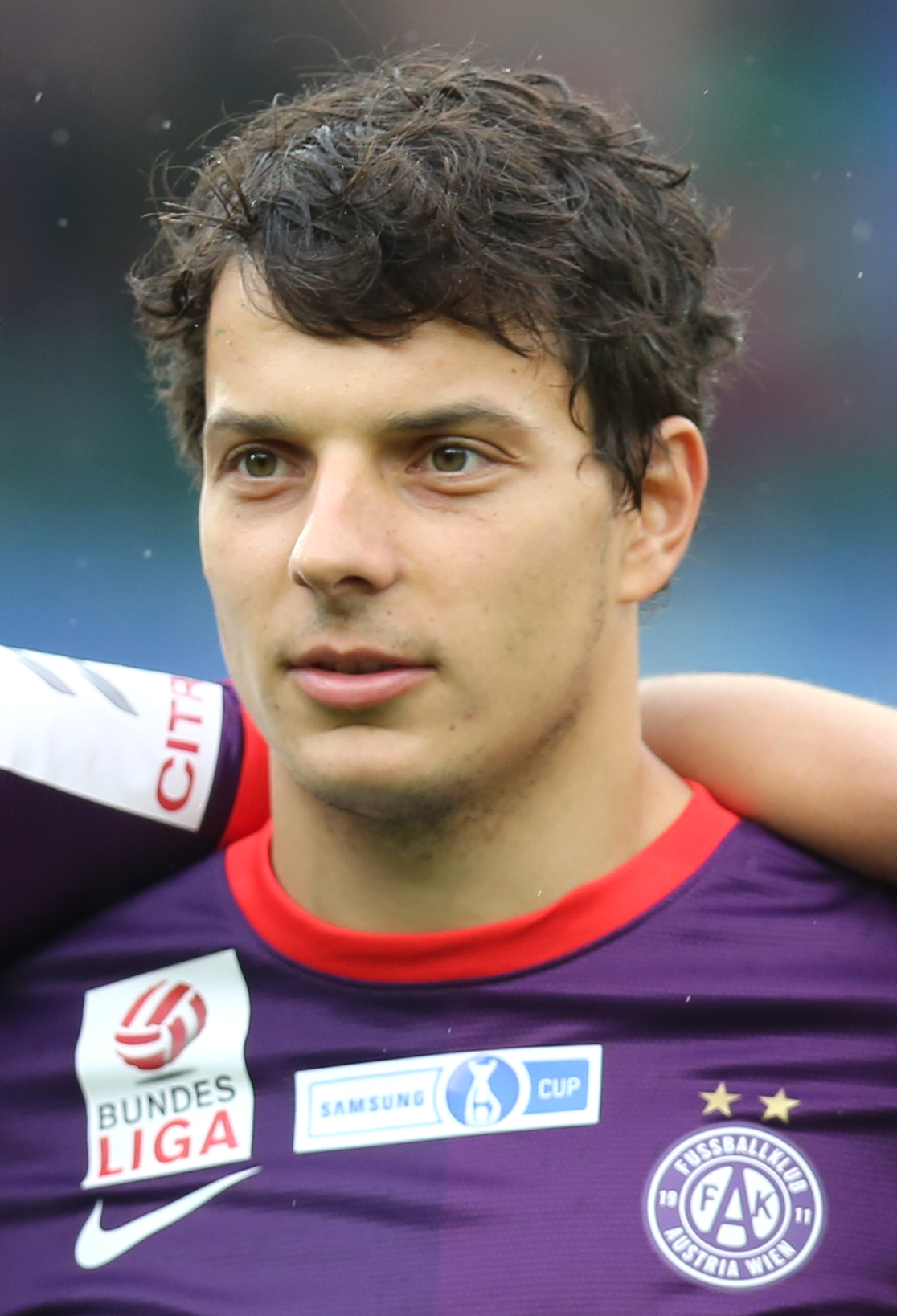
- Hosiner with Austria Wien in 2013

Personal information
- Date of birth: 15 May 1989 (age 37)
- Place of birth: Eisenstadt, Austria
- Height: 1.79 m (5 ft 10 in)
- Position: Striker

Team information
- Current team: Young Violets
- Number: 16

Youth career
- 1996–2001: SC Eisenstadt
- 2001–2002: SV St. Margarethen
- 2002–2005: AKA Burgenland
- 2005–2006: SV Mattersburg
- 2006–2008: 1860 Munich II

Senior career*
Years	Team	Apps	(Gls)
2008–2009	1860 Munich II	31	(12)
2009–2010	SV Sandhausen	20	(1)
2010–2011	First Vienna	33	(13)
2011–2012	Admira Wacker	38	(15)
2012–2014	Austria Wien	64	(46)
2014–2016	Rennes	12	(2)
2015–2016	→ 1. FC Köln (loan)	15	(1)
2016–2018	Union Berlin	44	(8)
2018–2019	Sturm Graz	14	(3)
2019–2020	Chemnitzer FC	28	(19)
2020–2022	Dynamo Dresden	42	(10)
2022–2023	Kickers Offenbach	42	(7)
2023–	Young Violets	82	(45)

International career^{‡}
2006	Austria U17	3	(0)
2008	Austria U18		
2009	Austria U19	3	(0)
2011–	Austria	5	(2)
- * Club domestic league appearances and goals as of 17 May 2026 ‡ National team caps and goals as of 22 April 2014

Philipp Hosiner (born 15 May 1989) is an Austrian professional footballer who plays as a striker for Austrian side Young Violets.

== Club career ==
=== Early career ===
He scored 12 goals in 31 matches for 1860 Munich II during the 2008–09 season. He scored one goal in 20 matches for SV Sandhausen during the 2009–10 season. He scored 16 goals in 38 matches for First Vienna FC for 2010–11 season.

=== Austria Wien ===
On 31 August 2012, Hosiner signed a three-year contract with FK Austria Wien having already scored five Bundesliga goals for Admira to start the season. On 27 October 2012, Hosiner scored his first hat-trick for Austria in their 6−4 win over his former club Admira. He followed this impressive performance up with another hat-trick in Austria's next league match, a 6−1 defeat of SV Ried. Just over a month later on 8 December 2012, Hosiner scored his third hat-trick of the season, guiding Austria Wien to a 6−3 win over Wolfsberger AC.

In his debut season with Austria Wien, Hosiner scored 32 league goals to finish as the "Torschützenliste", top scorer, of the Austrian Bundesliga. Hosiner was also voted as the "Player of the Season" in the Bundesliga as Austria Wien won their first league title since 2006 with a 4−0 win over SV Mattersburg on the final day of the season. However Hosiner failed to replicate his goal-scoring exploits in the final of the Austrian Cup on 30 May 2013, as Austria Wien fell to a 1−0 defeat to third division side FC Pasching, thanks to a goal from Daniel Sobkova. Hosiner was injured at the start of his second season at Austria Vienna, but he still managed to score 14 league goals in his final season at the club, before his move to French club Rennes.

=== Rennes ===
On 20 June 2014, Hosiner joined Rennes on a three-year deal. Hosiner made his debut for Rennes on 10 August 2014 in the first round of league fixtures, coming on as a second-half substitute for Abdoulaye Doucouré in the 2−0 loss. On 30 August, Hosiner came off the bench and won his side a penalty, which was converted by Ola Toivonen, to give Rennes a 1−0 victory over newly promoted Caen. On 29 October 2014, Hosiner scored the winner in Rennes 2–1 win over Marseille in the third round of the Coupe de la Ligue. Hosiner came on as a substitute in the match and scored with a beautiful back-heeled strike in injury time, to help Rennes knock Marseille out of the competition. Despite a decent start to his Rennes career, Hosiner was ruled out of playing for Rennes in the second half of the season, because a tumour was detected on his kidney during January 2015. He had his kidney removed in February 2015 and he remained sidelined, and out of action for the rest of the season.

=== 1. FC Köln ===
On 22 June 2015, Hosiner was loaned to 1. FC Köln until the end of the season. He played 15 games but managed to score one goal only, against Hamburger SV.

=== Union Berlin ===
In 2016, Hosiner signed a three-year deal with 2. Bundesliga side Union Berlin. He scored six goals in 26 matches during the 2016–17 season. He scored two goals in 21 matches during the 2017–18 season.

=== Sturm Graz ===
On 11 July 2018, Hosiner signed transferred to Sturm Graz and signed a three–year contract.

=== Chemnitzer FC ===
On 2 September 2019, Chemnitzer FC announced the signing of Hosiner.

=== Dynamo Dresden ===
He signed for newly relegated 3. Liga side Dynamo Dresden in July 2020.

=== Kickers Offenbach ===
On 11 January 2022, Hosiner signed with fourth-tier Regionalliga Südwest club Kickers Offenbach.

=== Young Violets Austria Wien ===
After leaving Offenbach, Hosiner signed with Young Violets Austria Wien - the developmental side of his former Bundesliga club FK Austria Wien, playing in the 3rd tier Regionalliga Ost - for the 2023–24 season, acting as a leader for the development of younger talents.

== International career ==
Hosiner made his senior debut for Austria on 7 October 2011 in a UEFA Euro 2012 qualifying match against Azerbaijan, coming on as an 88th-minute substitute for Marc Janko. His second cap, and first start, came on 22 March 2013, a 6–0 victory over the Faroe Islands in which Hosiner scored his first two goals for his country.

== Career statistics ==
=== Club ===
As of match played 24 February 2021

Appearances and goals by club, season and competition
Club	Season	League			National cup		Continental		Other		Total	
Club	Season	Division	Apps	Goals	Apps	Goals	Apps	Goals	Apps	Goals	Apps	Goals
1860 Munich II	2008–09	Regionalliga Süd	31	12	—		—		0	0	31	12
SV Sandhausen	2009–10	3. Liga	20	1	—		—		0	0	20	1
First Vienna	2010–11	First league	33	13	3	2	—		2 (Note: Appearance(s) in Austrian Football First League relegation play-off)	1	38	16
Admira Wacker	2011–12	Austrian Bundesliga	32	10	3	4	—		0	0	35	14
Admira Wacker	2012–13	Austrian Bundesliga	6	5	1	2	4 (Note: Appearance(s) in UEFA Europa League qualifying)	2	0	0	11	9
Admira Wacker	Total		38	15	4	6	4	2	0	0	46	23
Austria Wien	2012–13	Austrian Bundesliga	30	27	5	3	—		0	0	35	30
Austria Wien	2013–14	Austrian Bundesliga	34	14	2	1	10 (Note: Four appearances in UEFA Champions League qualifying; six appearances, two goals in UEFA Champions League)	2	0	0	46	17
Austria Wien	Total		64	41	7	4	10	2	0	0	81	47
Rennes	2014–15	Ligue 1	12	0	0	0	—		1 (Note: Appearance(s) in the Coupe de la Ligue)	1	13	1
1. FC Köln	2015–16	Bundesliga	15	1	0	0	—		0	0	15	1
1. FC Köln II	2015–16	Regionalliga West	1	1	—		—		0	0	1	1
Union Berlin	2016–17	2. Bundesliga	25	6	1	0	—		0	0	26	6
Union Berlin	2017–18	2. Bundesliga	19	2	2	0	—		0	0	21	2
Union Berlin	Total		44	8	3	0	0	0	0	0	47	8
Sturm Graz	2018–19	Austrian Bundesliga	14	3	2	0	4 (Note: Two appearances in UEFA Champions League qualifying; two appearances in UEFA Europa League qualifying)	0	0	0	20	3
Sturm Graz	2019–20	Austrian Bundesliga	0	0	1	1	2	0	0	0	3	1
Sturm Graz	Total		14	3	3	1	6	0	0	0	23	4
Chemnitzer FC	2019–20	3. Liga	28	19	0	0	—		0	0	28	19
Dynamo Dresden	2020–21	3. Liga	21	8	1	0	—		0	0	22	8
Career total			321	122	21	13	20	4	3	2	365	141

=== International ===
Scores and results list Austria's goal tally first.

#	Date	Venue	Opponent	Score	Result	Competition
1.	22 March 2013	Ernst Happel Stadium, Vienna, Austria	Faroe Islands	1–0	6–0	2014 FIFA World Cup qualification
2.	22 March 2013	Ernst Happel Stadium, Vienna, Austria	Faroe Islands	2–0	6–0	2014 FIFA World Cup qualification

== Honours ==
=== Club ===
Austria Wien

- Austrian Football Bundesliga: 2012–13
- Austrian Cup runner-up: 2012–13

=== Individual ===
- Austrian Football Bundesliga Player of the Year: 2012-13
- Austrian Football Bundesliga Top Scorer: 2012-13
