= Thomas Krammer =

Austrian footballer

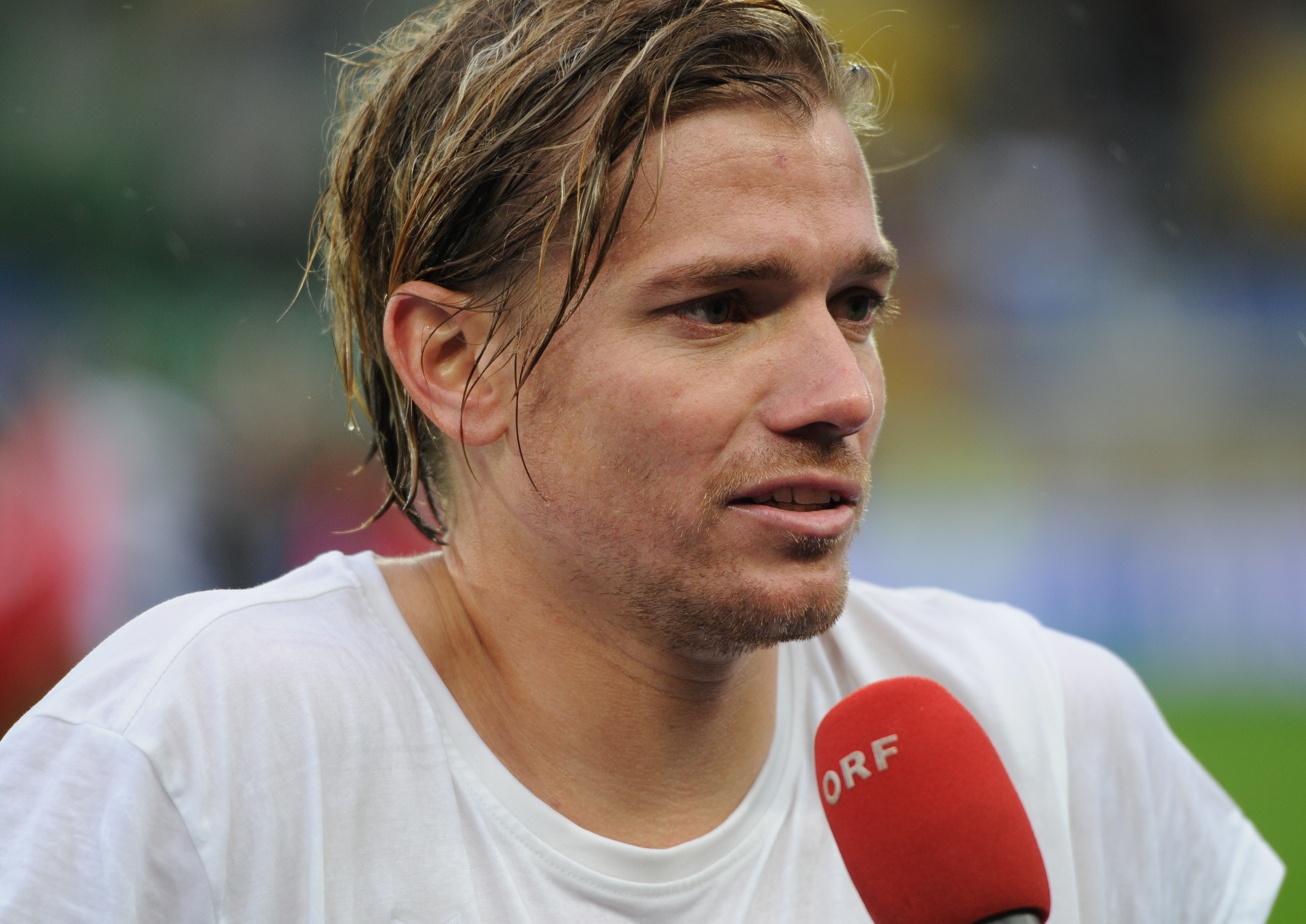

Personal information
- Date of birth: 18 February 1983 (age 43)
- Place of birth: Graz, Austria
- Height: 1.78 m (5 ft 10 in)
- Position: Midfielder

Team information
- Current team: SC Kalsdorf
- Number: 14

Youth career
- Sturm Graz

Senior career*
Years	Team	Apps	(Gls)
2001–2008	Sturm Graz	130	(9)
2008–2010	FK Austria Wien	37	(1)
2010	FC Admira Wacker Mödling	15	(3)
2010	LASK Linz	16	(0)
2011–2012	SV Grödig	49	(4)
2012–2014	FC Pasching	50	(3)
2014–2016	SK Vorwärts Steyr	43	(2)
2016	SC Kalsdorf	13	(1)
2016–	FSC Pöls	34	(6)
- * Club domestic league appearances and goals as of 26 January 2018

Thomas Krammer (born 18 February 1983) is an Austrian football midfielder who plays for FSC Pöls.

== Honours ==
Pasching

- Austrian Cup: 2012–13
