= Nacho Casanova =

Spanish footballer (born 1986)

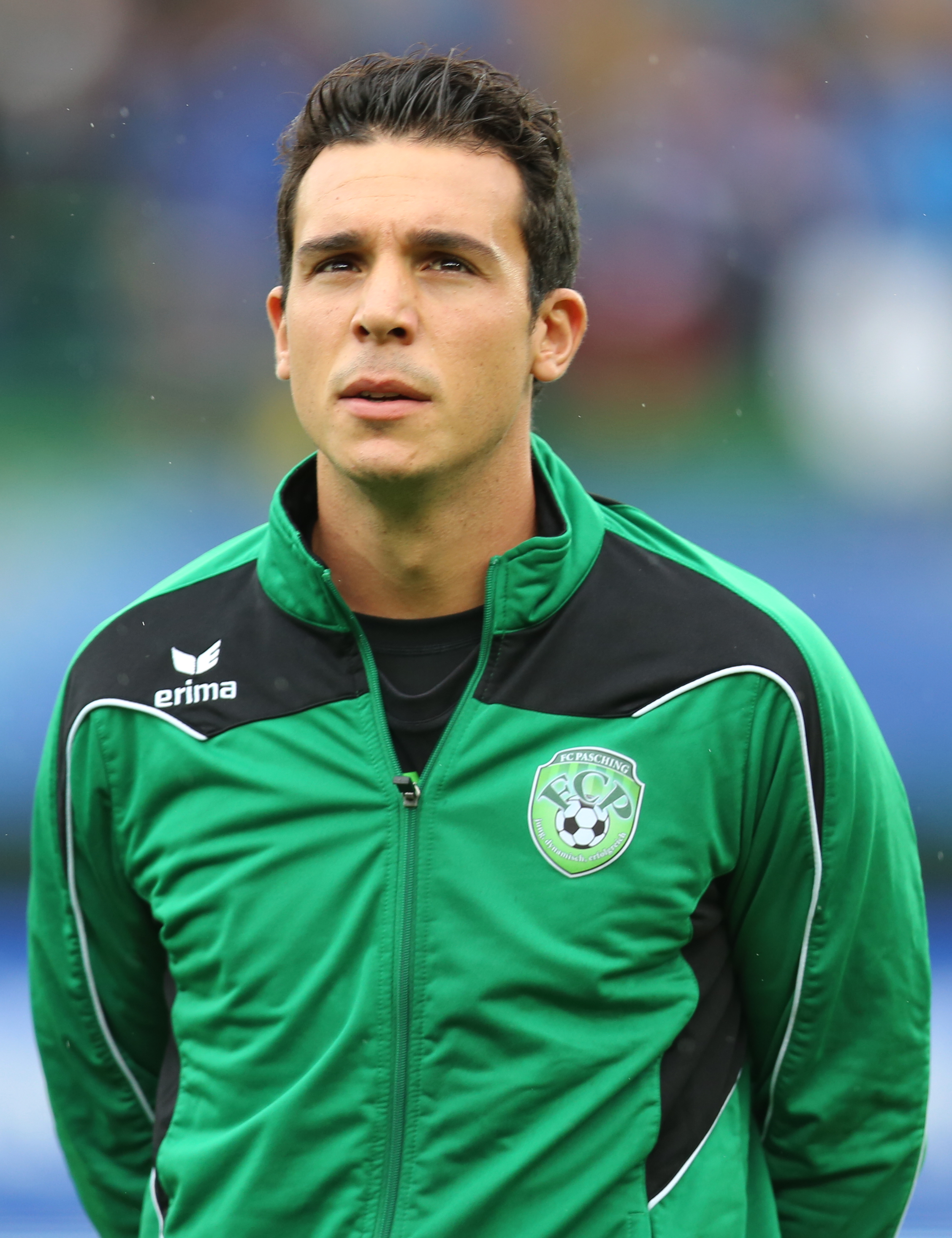
- Casanova in 2013

Personal information
- Full name: Ignacio Díaz Casanova Montenegro
- Date of birth: 4 February 1986 (age 40)
- Place of birth: Las Palmas, Spain
- Height: 1.82 m (6 ft 0 in)
- Position: Forward

Senior career*
Years	Team	Apps	(Gls)
2004–2007	Las Palmas B		
2004–2008	Las Palmas	22	(3)
2005	→ Castillo (loan)	16	(2)
2008–2009	Águilas	27	(1)
2009–2010	Mallorca B	31	(7)
2010–2011	Alicante	31	(11)
2011–2012	Ried	29	(6)
2012–2014	Pasching	36	(17)
2014–2015	Horn	45	(8)
2016–2018	Mannsdorf	38	(11)
Total		275+	(66+)
- * Club domestic league appearances and goals

Ignacio 'Nacho' Díaz Casanova Montenegro (born 4 February 1986 in Las Palmas, Canary Islands) is a Spanish former professional footballer who played as a forward.

== Honours ==
Pasching

- Austrian Cup: 2012–13
