= Mark Prettenthaler =

Austrian footballer

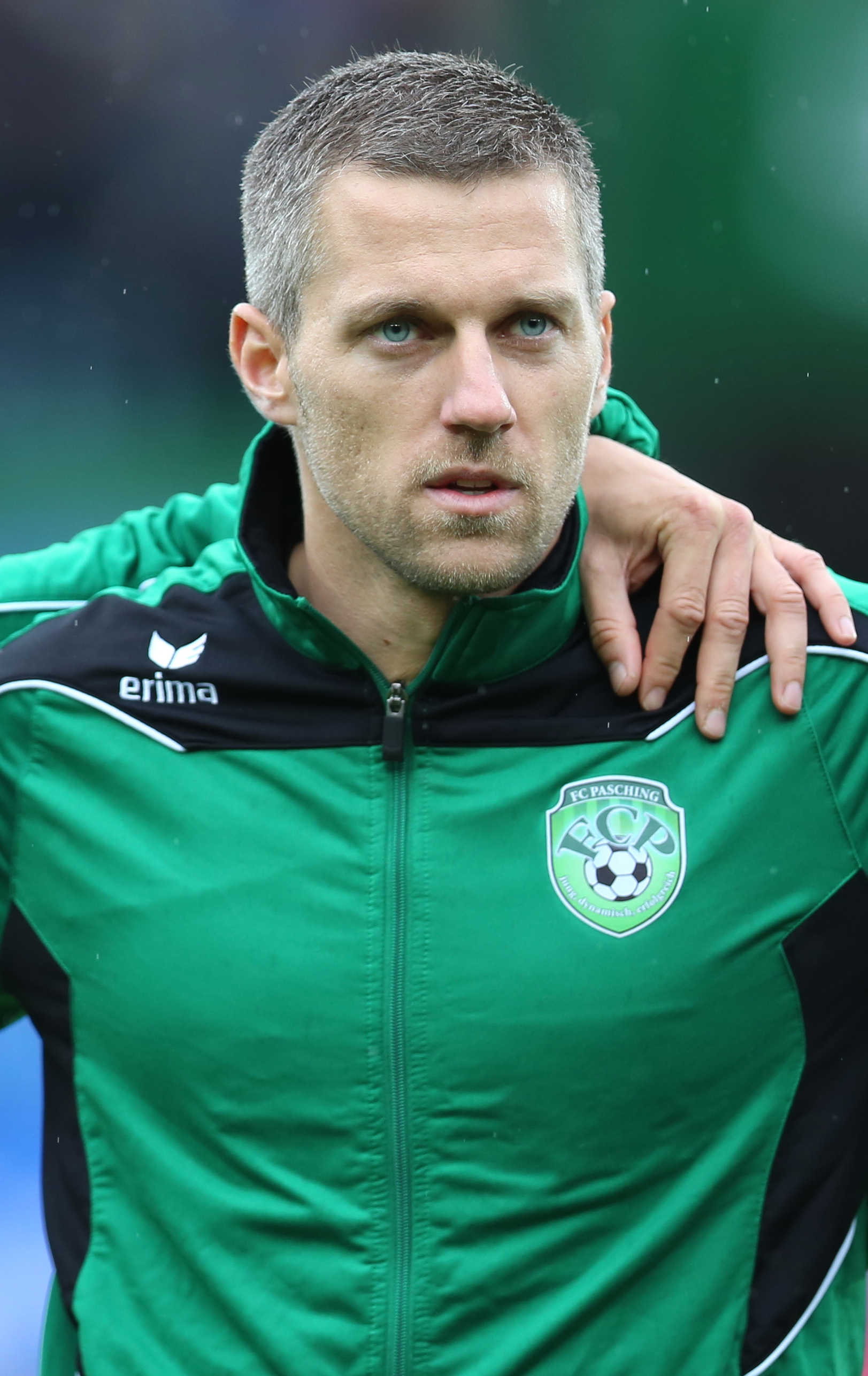

Personal information
- Date of birth: 11 April 1983 (age 43)
- Place of birth: Graz, Austria
- Height: 1.86 m (6 ft 1 in)
- Position: Defender

Youth career
- Austria Graz
- Sturm Graz
- FC Gratkorn

Senior career*
Years	Team	Apps	(Gls)
–2004	SV Pasching		
2005–2006	Kapfenberger SV	35	(2)
2006–2008	Sturm Graz	53	(3)
2008–2009	FC Augsburg	1	(1)
2009	Sturm Graz	5	(0)
2010	LASK Linz	12	(0)
2010–2011	SV Ried	23	(0)
2011–2012	Kapfenberger SV	19	(0)
2012–2014	FC Pasching	40	(3)
2014–2015	SC Wiener Neustadt	20	(0)
2016	SKN St. Pölten	8	(0)
2016–2017	FC Marchfeld Donauauen	9	(0)
2017	1. FC Bisamberg		

International career
	Austria U-19	6	(0)
- * Club domestic league appearances and goals

Mark Prettenthaler (born 11 April 1983) is a former Austrian footballer.

== Honours ==
Pasching

- Austrian Cup: 2012–13
