= Hans-Peter Berger =

Austrian footballer

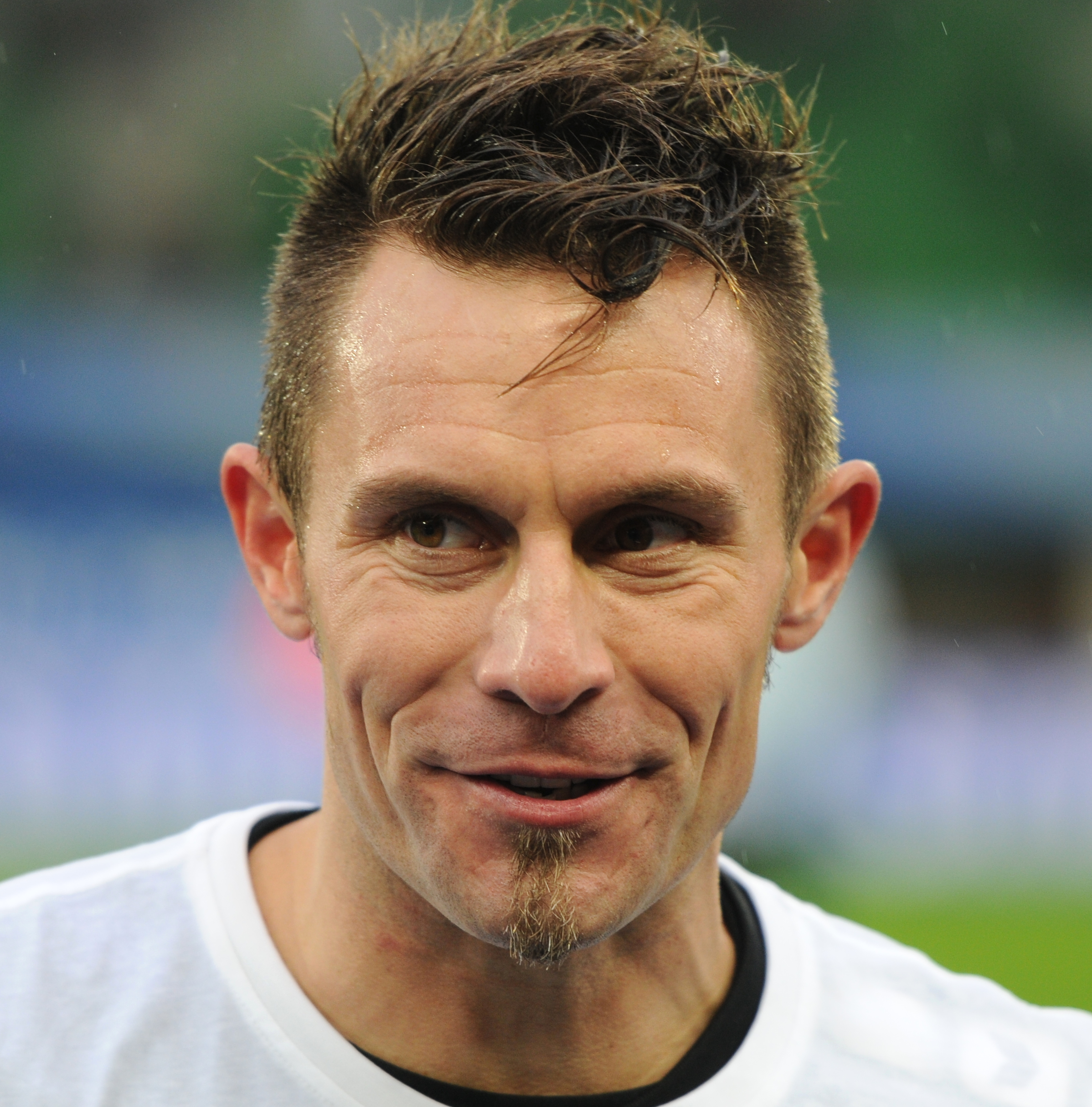
- Berger in 2013

Personal information
- Full name: Hans-Peter Berger
- Date of birth: 28 September 1981 (age 45)
- Place of birth: Salzburg, Austria
- Height: 1.79 m (5 ft 10 in)
- Position: Goalkeeper

Team information
- Current team: Liaoning Tieren (GK coach)

Youth career
- 1986–1993: FC Salzburg
- 1983–1998: Wüstenrot Salzburg

Senior career*
| Years | Team | Apps | (Gls) |
| 1998–1999 | Austria Salzburg | 0 | (0) |
| 1999–2000 | Wattens | 11 | (0) |
| 2000–2003 | Bad Bleiberg | 88 | (0) |
| 2003–2004 | LASK | 52 | (0) |
| 2004–2008 | SV Ried | 131 | (0) |
| 2008–2010 | Leixões | 7 | (0) |
| 2010–2012 | FC Admira Wacker Mödling | 41 | (0) |
| 2012–2014 | FC Pasching | 65 | (0) |
| 2014–2015 | TSV Hartberg | 29 | (0) |
| 2016 | FC Liefering | 4 | (0) |
| 2016–2017 | SV Grödig | 29 | (0) |
| 2017–2018 | Altheim | | |
| 2018–2020 | SAK 1914 | 40 | (0) |
| Total | | 497 | (0) |

International career
| 1999–2002 | Austria U21 | 19 | (0) |
- * Club domestic league appearances and goals

Hans-Peter Berger (born 28 September 1981) is an Austrian football coach and former professional player who played as a goalkeeper. He is a goalkeeping coach at Chinese Super League club Liaoning Tieren.

== Playing career ==
Born in Salzburg, Berger played for several clubs in his homeland, competing in all three major levels. He appeared in 102 Austrian Bundesliga games in his career, mainly with SV Ried which he helped to the second position in the 2006–07 season, whilst being named Goalkeeper of the Year in the process.

From 2008 to 2010, Berger represented Leixões in the Portuguese Primeira Liga. During his spell in Matosinhos, he played second-fiddle to Beto and Diego.

== Coaching career ==
Berger retired in June 2020, aged 38. Subsequently, he worked as a goalkeeper coach, most notably with Chengdu Rongcheng, Beijing Guoan and Liaoning Tieren in the Chinese Super League.

== Personal life ==
Berger's younger brother, Markus, was also a footballer.

== Honours ==
Pasching

- Austrian Cup: 2012–13
