= Ali Hamdemir =

Austrian footballer

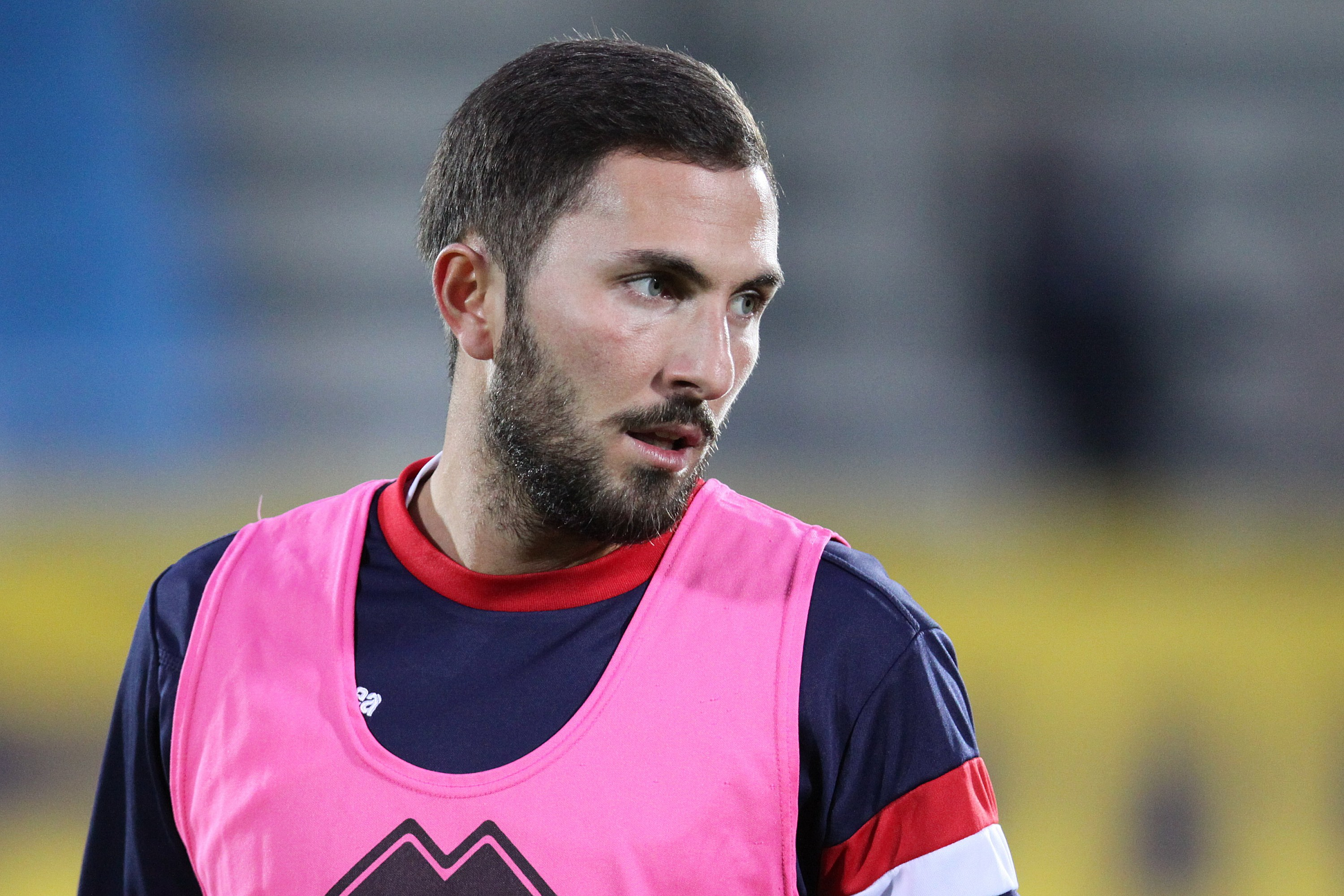
- Hamdemir in 2015

Personal information
- Date of birth: 1 May 1989 (age 37)
- Place of birth: Linz, Austria
- Height: 1.78 m (5 ft 10 in)
- Position: Midfielder

Team information
- Current team: ASKÖ Oedt
- Number: 21

Youth career
- LASK Linz

Senior career*
Years	Team	Apps	(Gls)
2007–2010	LASK Linz II	40	(0)
2007–2012	LASK Linz	37	(1)
2010–2011	→ FC Blau-Weiß Linz (loan)	30	(0)
2012–2014	FC Pasching	43	(0)
2014–2016	Austria Klagenfurt	56	(0)
2016–	ASKÖ Oedt	76	(0)
- * Club domestic league appearances and goals as of 31 August 2022

Ali Hamdemir (born 1 May 1989) is an Austrian footballer who plays as a midfielder for OÖ Liga club ASKÖ Oedt.

== Honours ==
Pasching

- Austrian Cup: 2012–13
