= Davorin Kablar =

Slovenian footballer

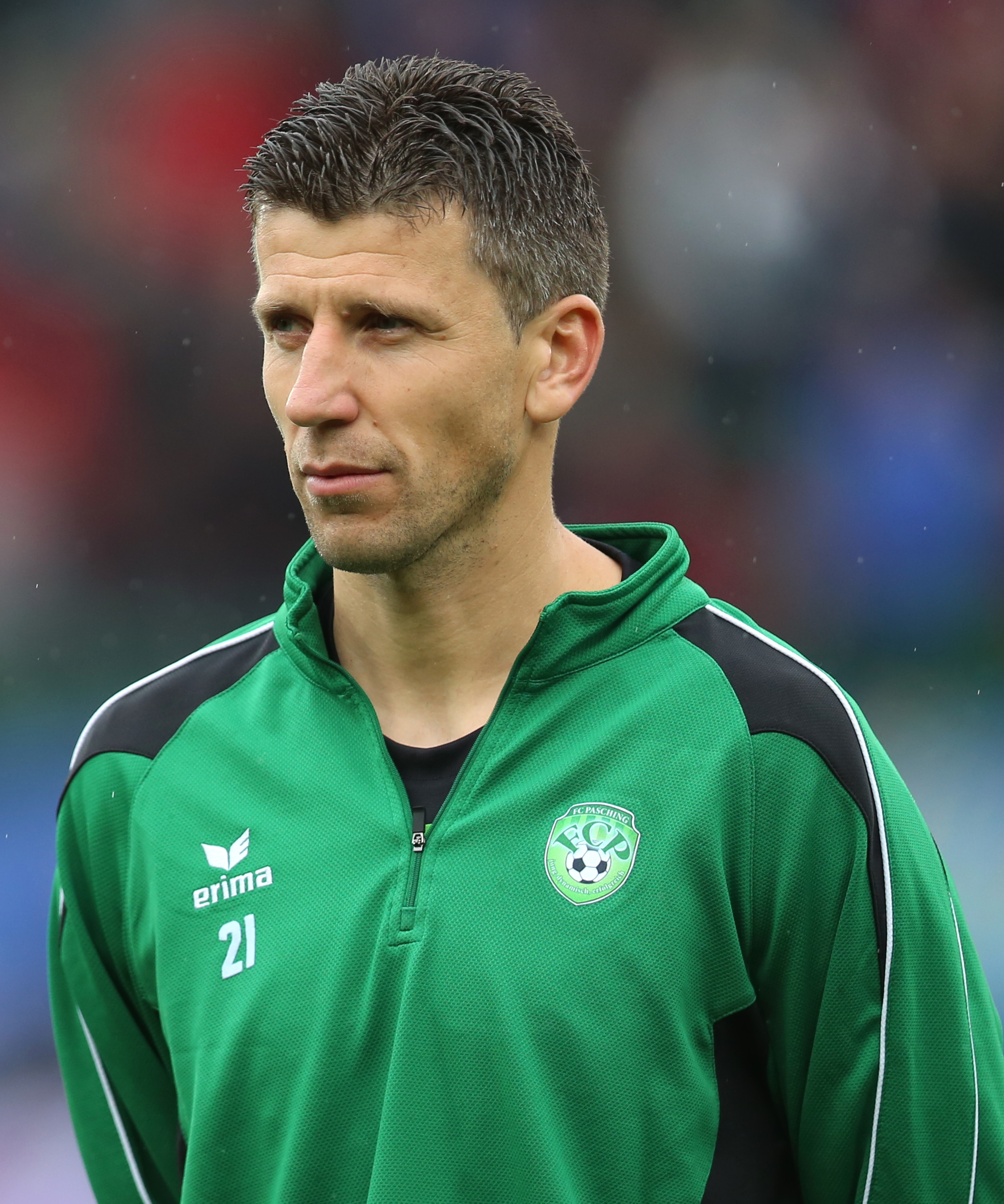
- Kablar with Pasching in the 2013 Austrian Cup final

Personal information
- Full name: Davorin Kablar
- Date of birth: 6 December 1977 (age 48)
- Place of birth: Brežice, SR Slovenia, SFR Yugoslavia
- Height: 1.96 m (6 ft 5 in)
- Position: Defender

Youth career
- Inter Zaprešić

Senior career*
Years	Team	Apps	(Gls)
1999–2002	Hrvatski Dragovoljac	20	(0)
2002–2003	Croatia Sesvete	0	(0)
2003	Närpes Kraft		
2004	Mariehamn		
2004	Ried	15	(0)
2004	Cerezo Osaka	10	(0)
2005–2006	Ried	47	(1)
2007–2009	LASK	16	(0)
2008–2009	→ LASK/Schwanenstadt 08 (loan)	3	(0)
2009–2013	Pasching	121	(12)
2014	Wels	15	(3)
2014–2015	ATSV Stadl-Paura	28	(2)
2015–2016	ASKÖ Oedt	37	(8)
2017–2018	Wels Juniors	6	(5)
2018–2020	Union Natternbach	36	(3)

Managerial career
- 2017-2018: Wels
- 2018-2019: Grün-Weiß Micheldorf
- 2020-2022: ASKÖ Oedt
- 2022-: Union Peuerbach
- * Club domestic league appearances and goals

Davorin Kablar (born 6 December 1977) is a Slovenian retired football player.

== Career ==
The defender has played for LASK Linz, SV Ried, Cerezo Osaka, IFK Mariehamn, Hrvatski Dragovoljac and NK Inter Zaprešić.

== Honours ==
Pasching

- Austrian Cup: 2012–13
