= Andreas Wieland =

Austrian football manager

Personal information
- Date of birth: 16 August 1983 (age 43)
- Place of birth: Vienna, Austria
- Height: 1.80 m (5 ft 11 in)

Team information
- Current team: LASK (technical director)

Youth career
- –2001: St. Pölten
- 2002: Ried
- 2002–2003: Rapid Wien

Senior career*
Years	Team	Apps	(Gls)
2003–2004	St. Pölten		
2004–2005	Interwetten		
2005	Würmla		
2006	Schrems		
2006	Eisenstadt		
2007–2009	Purkersdorf		
2009–2010	Krems		
2010–2011	Purgstall		

Managerial career
- 2014–2015: AKA St. Pölten (youth)
- 2018–2019: Juniors OÖ (assistant)
- 2019–2020: LASK (assistant)
- 2021: Juniors OÖ
- 2021: LASK (assistant)
- 2021–2022: LASK
- 2022–2023: Beerschot
- 2024–: LASK (technical director)
- * Club domestic league appearances and goals

Andreas Wieland (born 16 August 1983) is an Austrian football coach and a former player. He is the technical director of Austrian Bundesliga club LASK.
