= Stefan Hierländer =

Austrian footballer (born 1991)

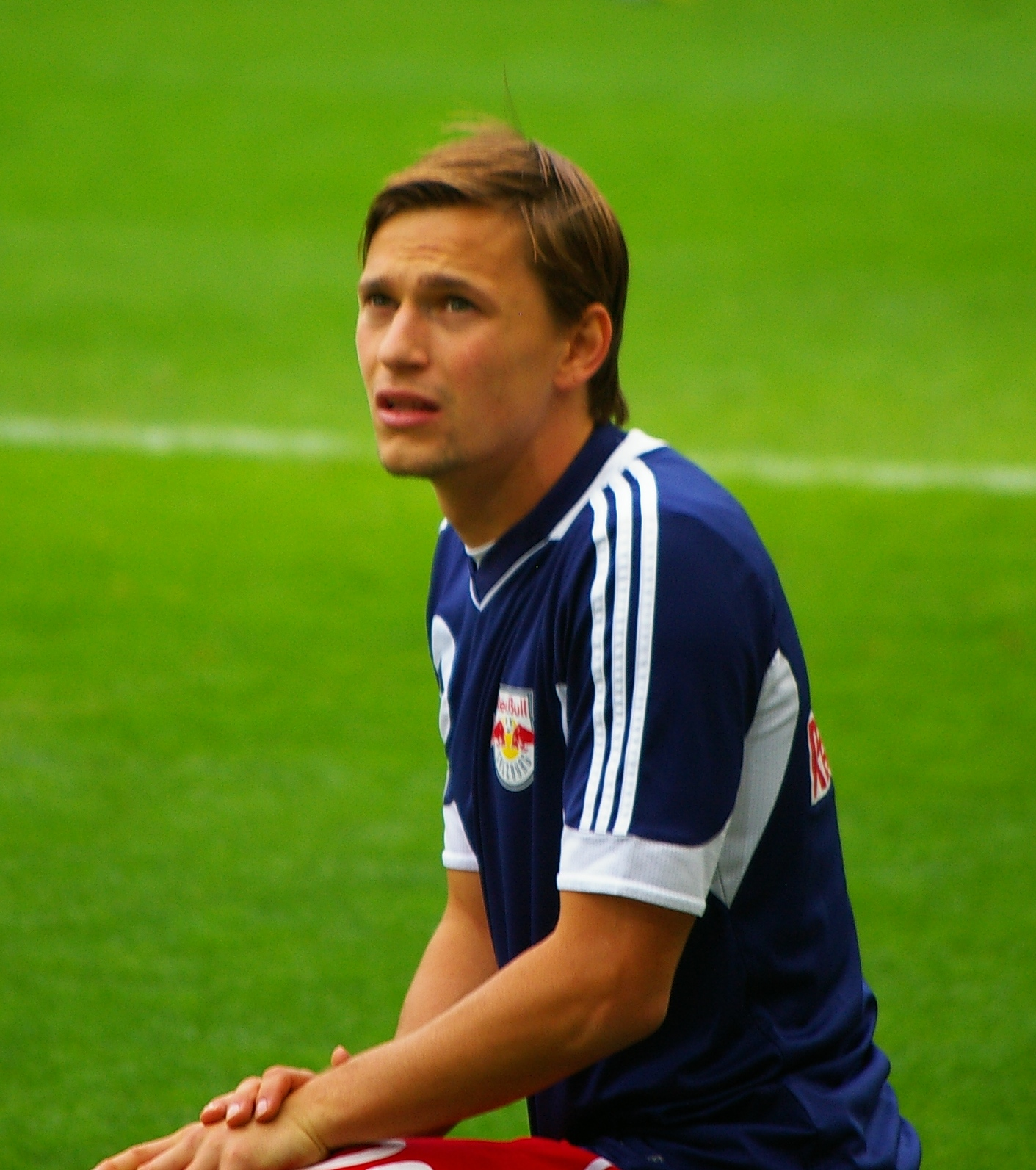
- Hierländer with Red Bull Salzburg in 2013

Personal information
- Full name: Stefan Lukas Hierländer
- Date of birth: 3 February 1991 (age 35)
- Place of birth: Villach, Carinthia, Austria
- Height: 1.80 m (5 ft 11 in)
- Position: Midfielder

Team information
- Current team: SK Sturm Graz II (assistant coach)

Youth career
- 1997–2002: SV Greifenburg
- 2002–2005: SV Spittal
- 2005–2007: FC Kärnten
- 2007–2008: Austria Kärnten
- 2008: Sampdoria

Senior career*
Years	Team	Apps	(Gls)
2008–2010	Austria Kärnten	38	(4)
2010–2014	Red Bull Salzburg	78	(3)
2014–2016	RB Leipzig	22	(0)
2015–2016	RB Leipzig II	17	(6)
2016–2026	Sturm Graz	244	(20)

International career
	Austria U17	8	(0)
	Austria U18	10	(0)
	Austria U19	11	(3)
2010–2011	Austria U21	13	(1)
2018	Austria	3	(0)

Managerial career
- 2026–: SK Sturm Graz II (assistant)
- * Club domestic league appearances and goals

Stefan Lukas Hierländer (born 3 February 1991) is an Austrian professional football coach and a former midfielder who is an assistant manager with SK Sturm Graz II.

== Club career ==
Hierländer started his football career in his local club SV Greifenburg and played 2002 till 2007 for SV Spittal/Drau. From 2008 until 2010 he played for Austrian Football Bundesliga side SK Austria Kärnten. His first match in the first squad was on 18 March 2009 versus Sturm Graz, substituting Manuel Weber in the 57th minute. After Kärnten did not get a license for the 2010–11 season Hierländer signed a contract with Red Bull Salzburg.

On 31 May 2014, he signed a two-year contract with RB Leipzig.

On 9 May 2018, he scored the only goal as Sturm Graz beat Red Bull Salzburg in extra time to win the 2017–18 Austrian Cup.

== International career ==
Hierländer got his first call up to the senior Austria side after Guido Burgstaller withdrew through injury for 2018 FIFA World Cup qualifiers against Wales and Georgia in September 2017. He finally made a debut in the national team on 27 March 2018 in a 4–0 win against Luxembourg.

== Coaching career ==
In the summer of 2026, Hierländer retired from playing and was hired as an assistant coach with SK Sturm Graz II.

== Career statistics ==
=== Club ===
As of match played on 17 May 2026

Appearances and goals by club, season and competition
Club	Season	League			Cup (Note: Includes in the Austrian Cup and German Cup.)		Continental		Other		Total	
Club	Season	Division	Apps	Goals	Apps	Goals	Apps	Goals	Apps	Goals	Apps	Goals
Austria Kärnten	2008–09	Austrian Bundesliga	8	0	—		—		—		8	0
Austria Kärnten	2009–10	Austrian Bundesliga	30	4	4	1	—		—		34	5
Austria Kärnten	Total		38	4	4	1	—		—		!42	5
Red Bull Salzburg	2010–11	Austrian Bundesliga	21	1	2	0	5 (Note: Appearances in the UEFA Champions League and UEFA Europa League)	1	—		28	2
Red Bull Salzburg	2011–12	Austrian Bundesliga	19	0	3	1	9 (Note: Appearances in the UEFA Europa League)	0	—		31	1
Red Bull Salzburg	2012–13	Austrian Bundesliga	20	1	1	0	1 (Note: Appearances in the UEFA Champions League)	0	—		22	1
Red Bull Salzburg	2013–14	Austrian Bundesliga	18	1	4	1	6	0	—		28	2
Red Bull Salzburg	Total		78	3	10	2	21	1	—		109	6
RB Leipzig	2014–15	2. Bundesliga	21	0	1	0	—		—		22	0
RB Leipzig	2015–16	2. Bundesliga	1	0	1	0	—		—		2	0
RB Leipzig	Total		22	0	2	0	—		—		24	0
RB Leipzig II	2015–16	Regionalliga Nordost	17	6	—		—		—		17	6
Sturm Graz	2016–17	Austrian Bundesliga	30	5	2	0	—		—		32	5
Sturm Graz	2017–18	Austrian Bundesliga	32	4	5	1	4	1	—		41	6
Sturm Graz	2018–19	Austrian Bundesliga	26	2	2	1	3	0	2	0	33	3
Sturm Graz	2019–20	Austrian Bundesliga	26	4	3	0	0	0	—		29	4
Sturm Graz	2020–21	Austrian Bundesliga	32	3	5	1	0	0	—		37	4
Sturm Graz	2021–22	Austrian Bundesliga	21	1	2	0	5	0	—		28	1
Sturm Graz	2022–23	Austrian Bundesliga	28	0	5	0	6 (Note: Two appearances in UEFA Champions League, four appearances in UEFA Europa League)	0	—		39	0
Sturm Graz	2023–24	Austrian Bundesliga	22	0	6	0	11 (Note: Two appearances in UEFA Champions League, five appearances in UEFA Europa League, four appearances in UEFA Europa Conference League)	0	—		39	0
Sturm Graz	2024–25	Austrian Bundesliga	14	0	1	0	6	0	—		21	0
Sturm Graz	2025–26	Austrian Bundesliga	13	1	0	0	3	0	—		16	1
Sturm Graz	Total		244	20	31	3	38	1	2	0	315	24
Career total			399	33	47	6	59	2	2	0	507	41

=== International ===
As of match played 16 October 2018

Appearances and goals by national team and year
National team	Year	Apps	Goals
Austria	2018	3	0
Total		3	0

== Honours ==
Red Bull Salzburg

- Austrian Bundesliga: 2011–12, 2013–14
- Austrian Cup: 2011–12, 2013–14

Sturm Graz

- Austrian Bundesliga: 2023–24, 2024-25
- Austrian Cup: 2017–18, 2022–23, 2023–24
