= Rubén Rivera (footballer) =

Spanish footballer (born 1985)

Personal information
- Full name: Rubén Rivera Corral
- Date of birth: 3 May 1985 (age 41)
- Place of birth: A Coruña, Spain
- Height: 1.82 m (6 ft 0 in)
- Position: Forward

Youth career
- Laracha
- Deportivo La Coruña

Senior career*
Years	Team	Apps	(Gls)
2004–2008	Deportivo B	95	(30)
2007	Deportivo La Coruña	1	(0)
2008–2012	Montañeros	144	(58)
2012–2013	Wolfsberger AC	30	(3)
2013–2014	Admira Wacker	8	(0)
2014	→ Leganés (loan)	7	(0)
2014–2015	Avilés	13	(1)
2015	Coruxo	18	(5)
2015–2017	Boiro	74	(31)
2017–2020	Bergantiños	98	(43)
2020–2021	Silva	12	(2)
2021–2023	Atlético Montañeros	77	(32)
2023–2024	As Pontes	30	(3)
2024–2025	Paiosaco	26	(2)
Total		633	(210)
- * Club domestic league appearances and goals

Rubén Rivera Corral (born 3 May 1985) is a Spanish former professional footballer who played as a forward.

== Club career ==
Rivera was born in A Coruña, Galicia. A product of Deportivo de La Coruña's youth academy, he appeared only once for its first team in the league, featuring 33 minutes in a 0–0 La Liga home draw against Levante UD on 18 February 2007. He scored once in the Copa del Rey for them, in the 4–1 home victory over Real Valladolid in the quarter-finals.

Subsequently, Rivera all but competed in the Spanish lower leagues, mainly with neighbouring Montañeros CF. From 2012 to 2014 he played in the Austrian Football Bundesliga, in representation of Wolfsberger AC and FC Admira Wacker Mödling.

Rivera returned to his country in the 2014 January transfer window, signing for Segunda División B club CD Leganés on loan. In the following years, he represented a host of teams at that level but also in the Tercera División.
