= Daniel Kerschbaumer =

Austrian footballer

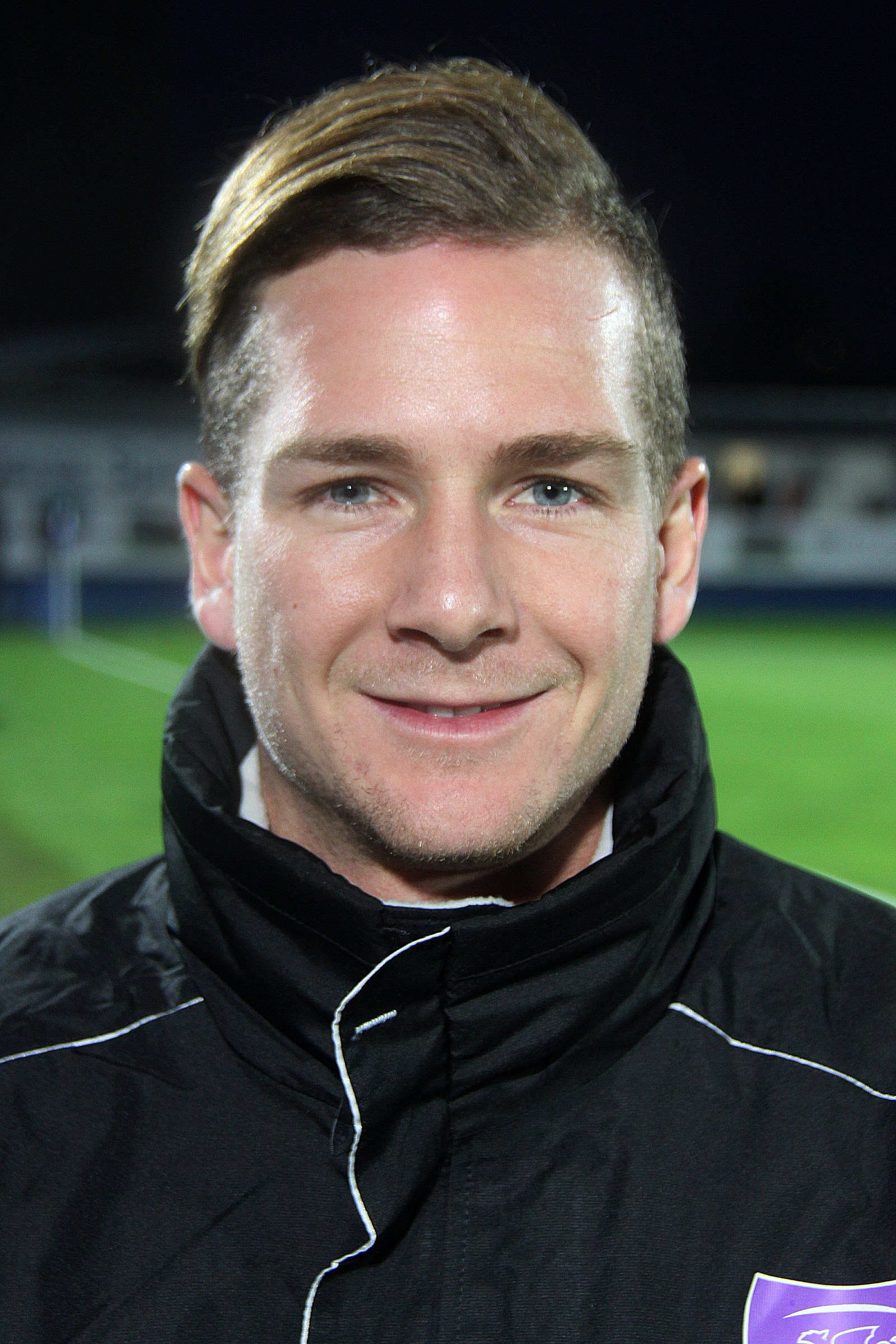

Personal information
- Date of birth: 11 June 1989 (age 37)
- Place of birth: Austria
- Height: 1.73 m (5 ft 8 in)
- Position: Right back

Team information
- Current team: Union Weißkirchen
- Number: 26

Youth career
- 1997–2003: Grün-Weiß Micheldorf
- 2003–2004: Austria Wien
- 2004–2008: SV Ried

Senior career*
| Years | Team | Apps | (Gls) |
| 2008–2009 | SV Ried II | | |
| 2009–2012 | Vorwärts Steyr | 45 | (3) |
| 2012–2014 | Pasching | 56 | (1) |
| 2014–2015 | LASK Linz | 26 | (1) |
| 2015–2016 | Austria Klagenfurt | 13 | (0) |
| 2016–2018 | Blau-Weiß Linz | 83 | (3) |
| 2018 | Mattersburg | 9 | (1) |
| 2019 | Vorwärts Steyr | 13 | (0) |
| 2020 | ASKÖ Oedt | 1 | (0) |
| 2020– | Union Weißkirchen | 110 | (4) |
- * Club domestic league appearances and goals as of 14:08, 31 January 2025 (UTC)

Daniel Kerschbaumer (born 11 June 1989) is an Austrian footballer who plays for Union Weißkirchen.

== Career ==
In January 2020, Kerschbaumer joined OÖ Liga club ASKÖ Oedt.

== Honours ==
Pasching

- Austrian Cup: 2012–13
