= Martin Hiden =

Austrian football player and manager (born 1973)

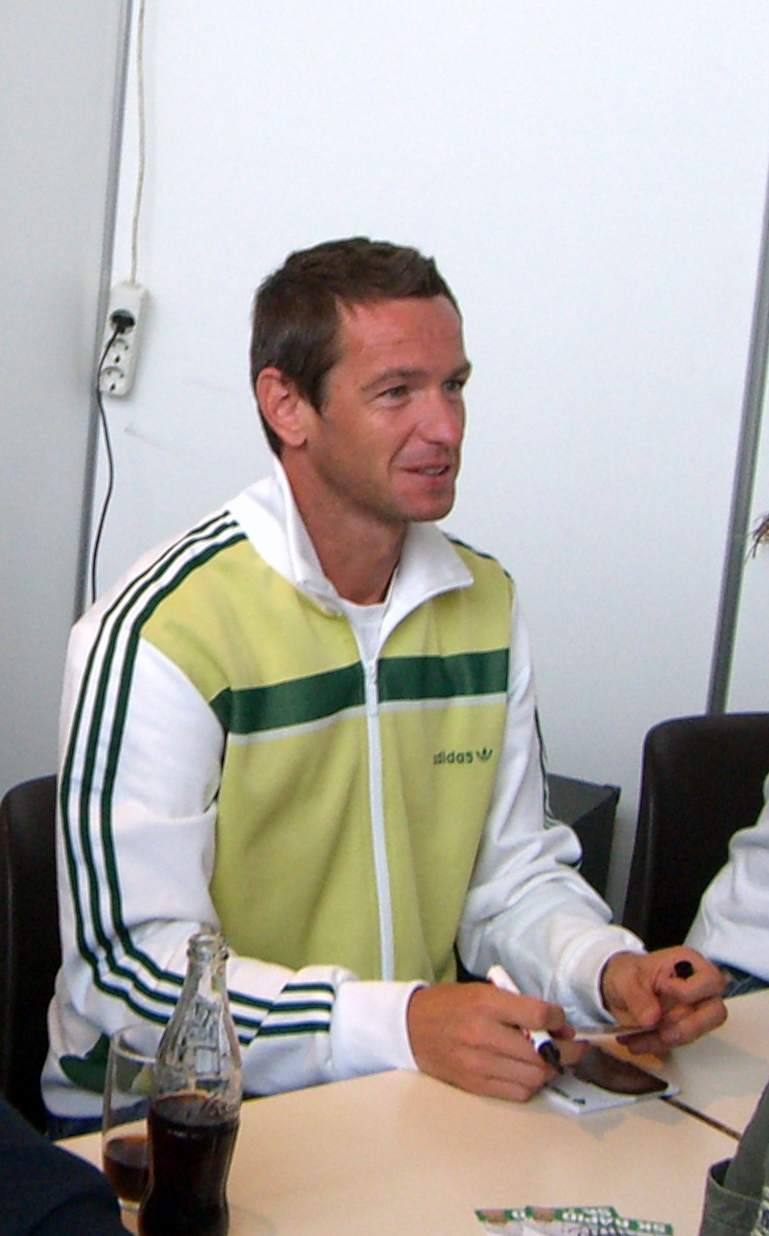

Personal information
- Date of birth: 11 March 1973 (age 53)
- Place of birth: Stainz, Austria
- Height: 1.84 m (6 ft 0 in)
- Position: Defender

Team information
- Current team: FC Pasching

Youth career
- St Stefan ob Stainz

Senior career*
Years	Team	Apps	(Gls)
1992–1994	Sturm Graz	53	(5)
1994–1996	Austria Salzburg	59	(2)
1996–1997	Sturm Graz	28	(3)
1997	Rapid Wien	20	(0)
1998–2000	Leeds United	26	(0)
2000–2003	Austria Wien	82	(2)
2003–2007	Rapid Wien	106	(2)
2008	Austria Kärnten	10	(0)
2008–2009	Rapid Wien	4	(0)
2009	Austria Kärnten	11	(1)
2010	Red Bull Salzburg Juniors	1	(0)
Total		400	(15)

International career
1998–2008	Austria	50	(1)

Managerial career
- 2013–2015: FC Pasching
- 2015: LASK Linz
- * Club domestic league appearances and goals

Martin Hiden (born 11 March 1973 in Stainz) is a former Austrian football player, who is currently assistant coach at FC Pasching.

Hiden played the majority of his football career in Austria, his only stint abroad being with Leeds United in England. He also represented the Austria national football team at the 1998 FIFA World Cup and UEFA Euro 2008.

== Club career ==
He played for clubs such as Sturm Graz, SV Salzburg (where he claimed his first league title), Rapid Wien, Leeds United (England) and Austria Wien. Joining Leeds United in 1998, he was the first-ever Austrian outfield player (goalkeeper Alex Manninger joined Arsenal in 1997) to play in the Premier League. From 2003 he returned to Rapid Wien, winning the Austrian championship once more in 2005.

In 2006, he was announced as the new captain of Rapid (after a short period with goalkeeper Helge Payer as captain, who did not feel comfortable in the role that was given him after the departure of Steffen Hofmann), and in 2007, after the injuries of Andreas Ivanschitz and Martin Stranzl, he was also made captain of the national team for two matches.

== International career ==
He made his debut for Austria in a March 1998 friendly match against Hungary and was a participant at the 1998 FIFA World Cup but did not play. He earned 50 caps, scoring one goal. He also was part of the Euro 2008 squad.

== Coaching career ==
Hiden has a UEFA B License. He was head coach of FC Pasching from 5 September 2013 to when he was appointed interim head coach of LASK Linz. His first match was a 3–1 win against Villacher SV. His final match was a 3–1 win against Union Gurten. Hiden was named interim head coach of LASK Linz after Karl Daxbacher was sacked. The club had won two of their last eight matches and lost one of their last six. In his debut on 17 March 2015, Linz and SV Horn finished in a 1–1 draw.

== Career statistics ==
=== National team statistics ===
Austria national team
Year	Apps	Goals
1998	7	1
1999	0	0
2000	3	0
2001	7	0
2002	5	0
2003	3	0
2004	7	0
2005	0	0
2006	5	0
2007	11	0
2008	2	0
Total	50	1

=== International goal ===
Scores and results list Austria's goal tally first.

#	Date	Venue	Opponent	Score	Result	Competition
1.	14 October 1998	Stadio Olimpico, Serravalle	San Marino	3–0	4–1	Euro 2000 qualifier

=== Coaching record ===
As of 17 March 2015

Team	From	To	Record								
Team	From	To	M	W	D	L	GF	GA	GD	Win %	Ref.
FC Pasching	5 September 2013	16 March 2015	46	30	5	11	103	59	+44	65.22	
LASK Linz	16 March 2015	Present	1	0	1	0	1	1	+0	0.00	
Total			47	30	6	11	104	60	+44	63.83	—

== Honours ==
- Austrian Football Bundesliga (4):
  - 1995, 2003, 2005, 2008
- Austrian Cup (2):
  - 1997, 2003
