= Daniel Luxbacher =

Austrian footballer

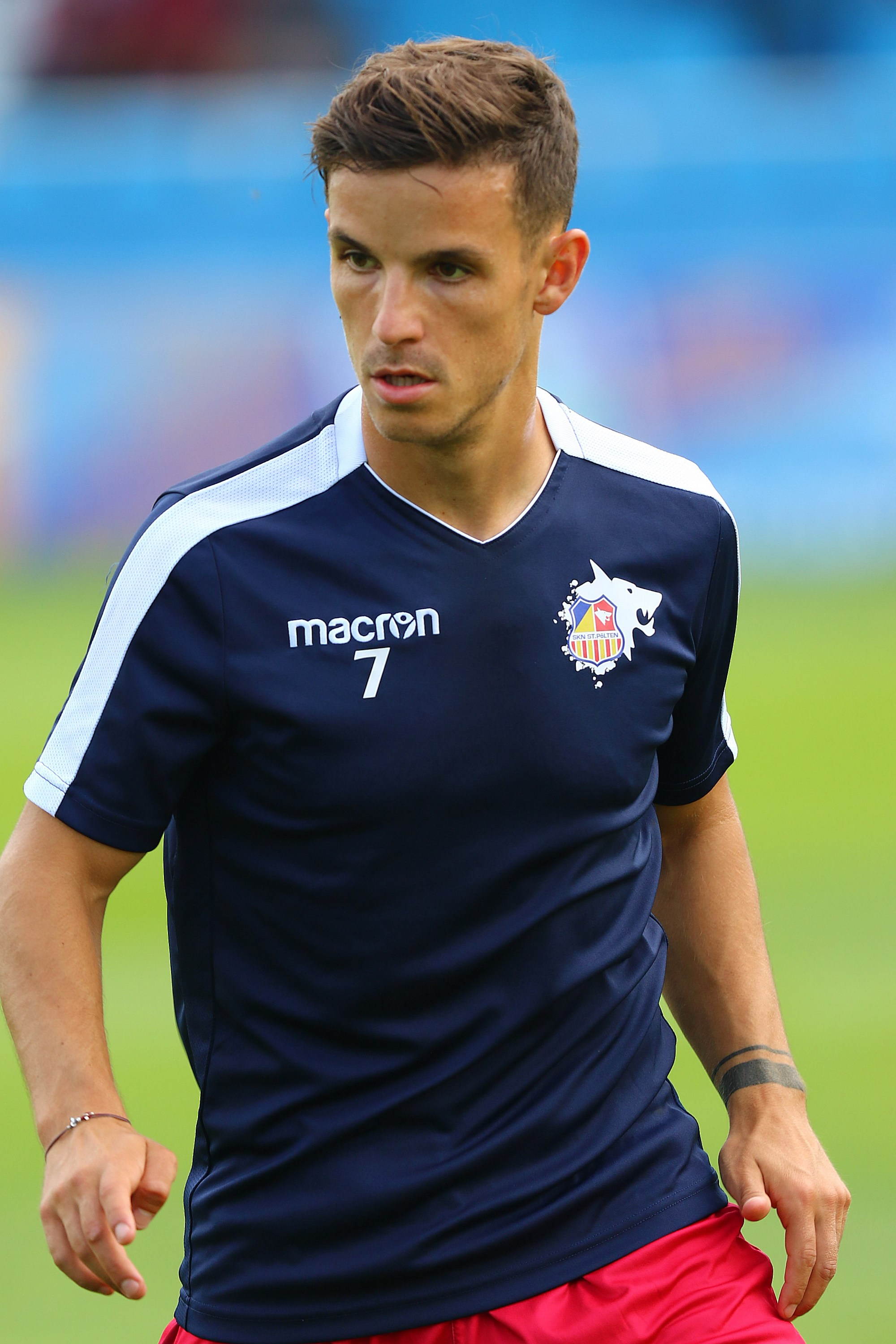
- Luxbacher in 2018

Personal information
- Full name: Daniel Luxbacher
- Date of birth: 13 March 1992 (age 34)
- Place of birth: Vienna, Austria
- Height: 1.74 m (5 ft 9 in)
- Position: Attacking midfielder

Team information
- Current team: First Vienna
- Number: 4

Youth career
- SV Hirschstetten/Lindenhof
- 2002–2006: FC Stadlau
- 2006–2009: SK Rapid Wien

Senior career*
Years	Team	Apps	(Gls)
2009–2013	SK Rapid Wien II	58	(4)
2011–2013	→ FC Lustenau 07 (loan)	51	(4)
2013–2017	SC Rheindorf Altach	100	(10)
2017–2021	SKN St. Pölten	85	(4)
2021–	First Vienna	72	(2)
- * Club domestic league appearances and goals as of 12 June 2025

Daniel Luxbacher (born 13 March 1992) is an Austrian professional footballer who plays as an attacking midfielder for First Vienna.

== Career statistics ==
As of matches played 28 October 2023

Appearances and goals by club, season and competition
Club	Season	League			Cup (Note: Appearances in the Austrian Cup.)		Other		Total	
Club	Season	Division	Apps	Goals	Apps	Goals	Apps	Goals	Apps	Goals
Rapid Wien (A)	2010–11	Regionalliga East	25	1	1	0	—		26	1
Lustenau	2011–12	First League	32	2	3	1	—		35	3
Lustenau	2012–13	First League	19	2	3	0	—		22	2
Lustenau	Total		51	4	6	1	—		57	5
Rheindorf Altach	2012–13	First League	15	0	0	0	—		15	0
Rheindorf Altach	2013–14	Austrian Bundesliga	31	8	2	1	—		33	9
Rheindorf Altach	2014–15	Austrian Bundesliga	15	0	2	0	—		17	0
Rheindorf Altach	2015–16	Austrian Bundesliga	13	2	1	0	2 (Note: Appearances in the UEFA Europa League.)	0	16	2
Rheindorf Altach	2016–17	Austrian Bundesliga	26	0	2	0	—		28	0
Rheindorf Altach	Total		100	10	7	1	2	0	109	11
St. Pölten	2017–18	Austrian Bundesliga	9	0	1	0	1 (Note: Appearances in the Relegation Playoff.)	0	11	0
St. Pölten	2018–19	Austrian Bundesliga	30	1	3	0	—		33	1
St. Pölten	2019–20	Austrian Bundesliga	25	3	4	2	—		29	5
St. Pölten	2020–21	Austrian Bundesliga	21	0	2	0	2	0	25	0
St. Pölten	Total		85	4	10	2	3	0	98	6
St. Pölten II	2017–18	Regionalliga East	1	0	—		—		1	0
First Vienna	2021–22	Regionalliga East	24	2	1	1	—		25	3
First Vienna	2022–23	2. Liga	27	0	1	0	—		28	0
First Vienna	2023–24	2. Liga	7	0	1	0	—		8	0
First Vienna	Total		57	2	6	1	—		63	3
Career total			320	21	27	5	5	0	352	26
