= Daniel Sobkova =

Austrian footballer (born 1985)

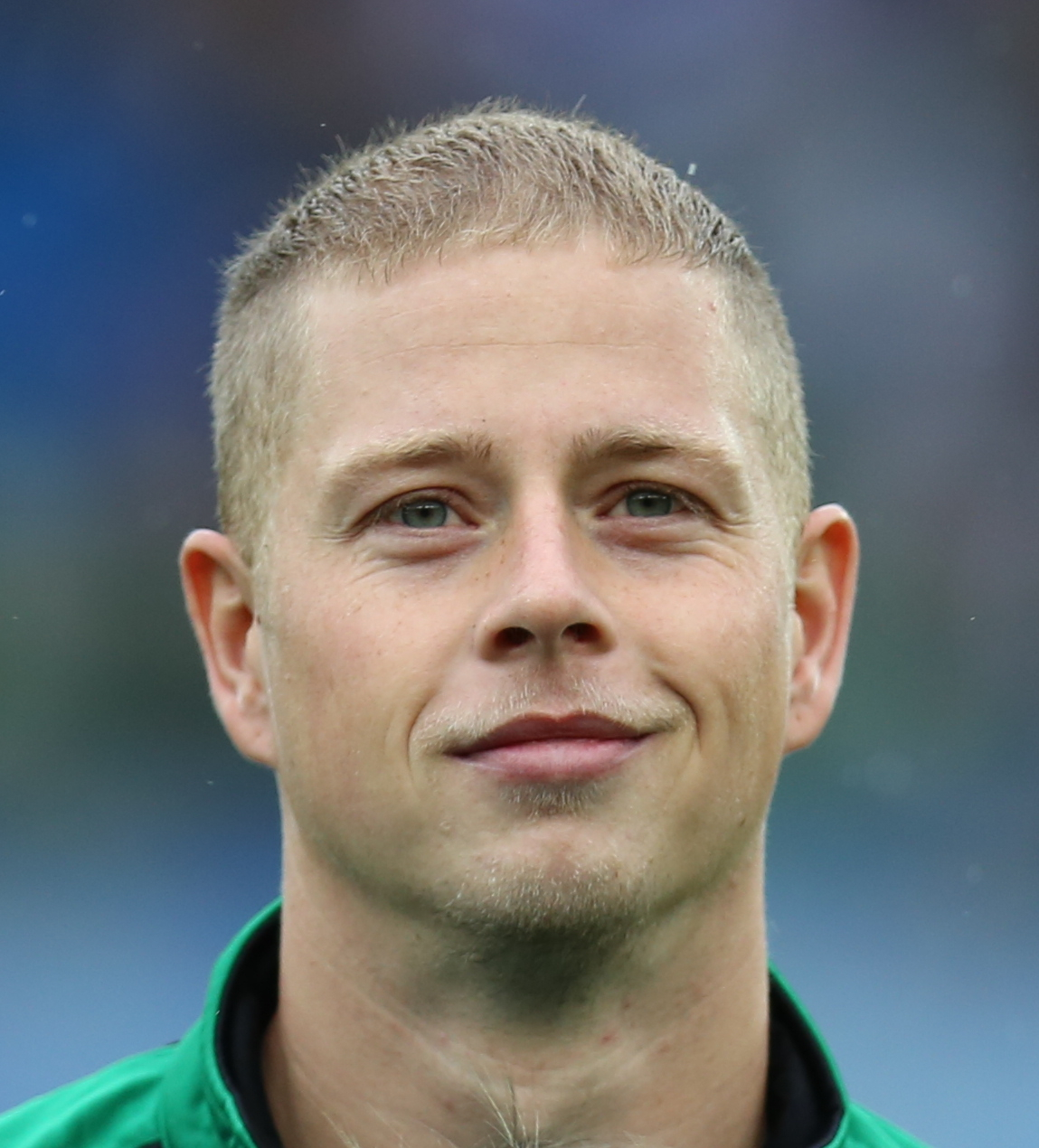
- ÖFB-Cupfinale 2013

Personal information
- Date of birth: 17 July 1985 (age 41)
- Place of birth: Linz, Austria
- Height: 1.84 m (6 ft 0 in)
- Position: Forward

Team information
- Current team: FC Schaan
- Number: 17

Youth career
- 1992–1998: LASK Linz
- 1998–2000: ASKÖ Doppl-Hart
- 2000–2003: Austria Wien

Senior career*
| Years | Team | Apps | (Gls) |
| 2003–2006 | Austria Wien II | 16 | (2) |
| 2004–2005 | → SV Ried (loan) | 5 | (0) |
| 2006–2010 | Austria Lustenau | 104 | (23) |
| 2010–2011 | LASK Linz | 12 | (1) |
| 2011–2012 | SV Grödig | 15 | (2) |
| 2012–2014 | FC Pasching | 67 | (44) |
| 2014–2018 | Austria Lustenau II | 40 | (21) |
| 2014–2018 | Austria Lustenau | 104 | (11) |
| 2018–2020 | Bregenz | 23 | (20) |
| 2021– | FC Schaan | 0 | (0) |

International career
| | Austria U17 | 1 | (0) |
| | Austria U18 | 2 | (0) |
| | Austria U19 | 7 | (0) |
| 2004–2005 | Austria U20 | 2 | (1) |
- * Club domestic league appearances and goals as of 01:31, 25 July 2019 (UTC)

Daniel Sobkova (born 17 July 1985) is an Austrian footballer who currently plays as a forward for FC Schaan. Sobkova scored the winning goal in the 2013 Austrian Cup Final as third tier Pasching defeated Austria Wien 1–0. He also scored their only goal in the 2013–14 UEFA Europa League.

== Honours ==
Pasching

- Austrian Cup: 2012–13
