= Gerald Baumgartner =

Austrian association football coach

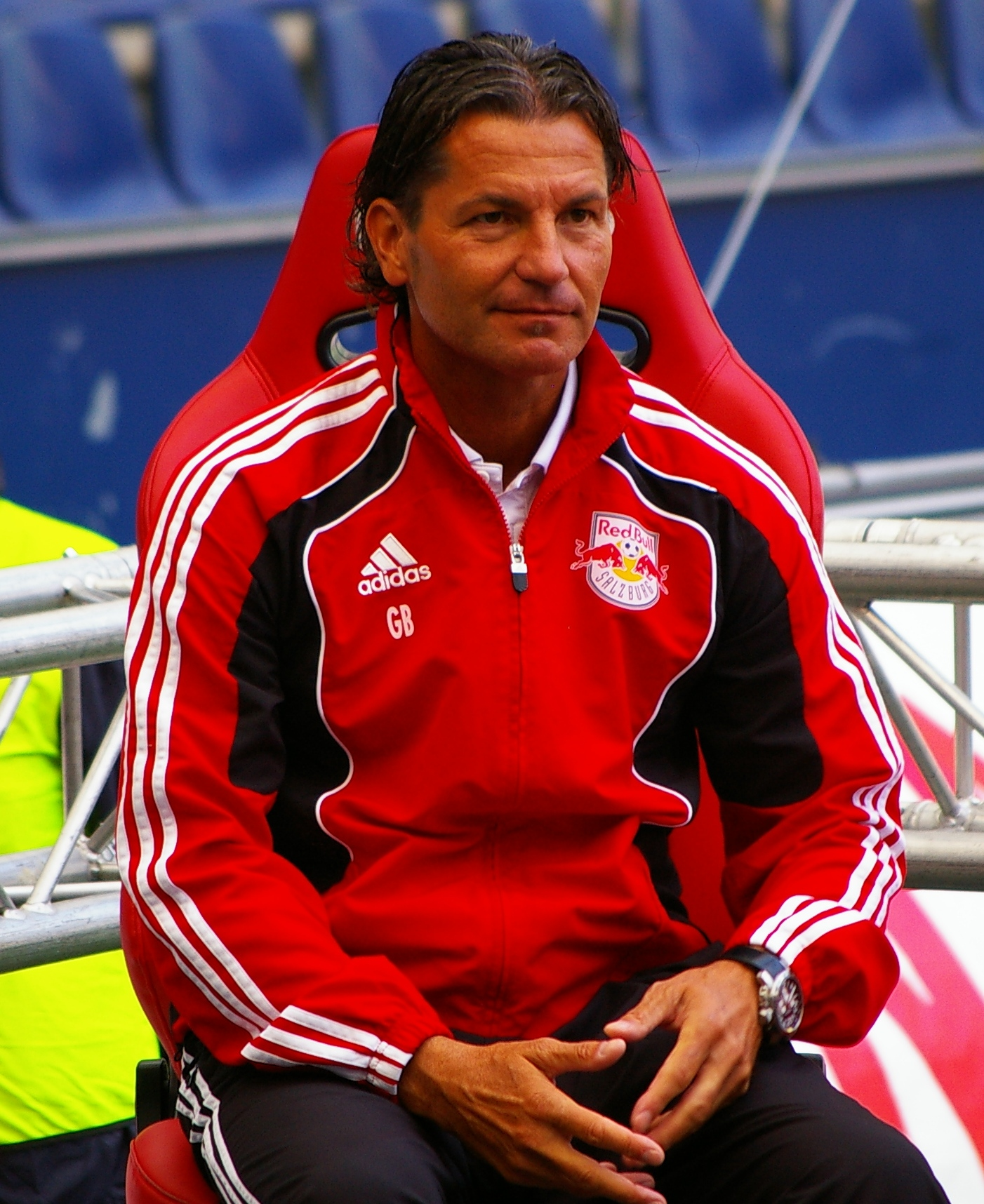
- Gerald Baumgartner in 2011

Personal information
- Full name: Gerald Baumgartner
- Date of birth: 14 November 1964 (age 61)
- Place of birth: Oberndorf bei Salzburg, Austria
- Height: 1.82 m (5 ft 11 1/2 in)

Senior career*
Years	Team	Apps	(Gls)
–1983	1. Oberndorfer SK		
1983–1987	Casino Salzburg		
1987–1989	Austria Wien	10	(0)
1989–1991	Casino Salzburg	35	(2)
1991	First Vienna FC	14	(3)
1991–1992	SK Vorwärts Steyr	13	(1)
1992–1993	Casino Salzburg		
1993–1995	SV Ried	2	(0)
1995–1998	1. Oberndorfer SK		
1998–2001	Union Vöcklamarkt		
2001–2006	1. Oberndorfer SK		

Managerial career
- 2011: Red Bull Salzburg (A) (reserve)
- 2012–2013: Pasching
- 2013–2014: St. Pölten
- 2014–2015: Austria Wien
- 2015–2016: Austria Salzburg
- 2017–2018: SV Mattersburg
- 2019–2020: SV Ried
- 2021: SKN St. Pölten
- * Club domestic league appearances and goals

Gerald Baumgartner (born 14 November 1964) is an Austrian association football coach. He has been head coach of Red Bull Salzburg (A), Pasching, St. Pölten, Austria Wien, Austria Salzburg and SV Ried.

== Playing career ==
Baumgartner played for Austria Wien from 1987 to 1989.

== Coaching career ==
=== Early career ===
His coaching career started as an assistant coach for the reserve team for Red Bull Salzburg. He then became the head coach for the reserve team for Red Bull Salzburg from 8 April 2011 to 31 December 2011. He then went on to become head coach of Pasching from 1 January 2012 to 4 September 2013 and St. Pölten from 5 September 2014 until he became head coach of Austria Wien on 27 May 2014. Baumgartner brought St. Pölten to the Austrian Cup final during the 2013–14 season after defeating Sturm Graz 1–0 in extra time in the semi–final and qualified for the Europa League.

=== Austria Wien ===
Baumgartner became head coach of Austria Wien on 27 May 2014 and had his first training session on 10 June 2014. The style he wanted to implement was an aggressive pressing. His first competitive match in–charge at the club was a 6–0 win in the first round of the Austrian Cup against First Vienna FC. After the win in the Austrian Cup, Baumgartner failed to win any of his first seven matches in the Bundesliga. His league record at this point was five draws and two losses. His first league win came against Ried which finished 3–1. Baumgartner was sacked on 22 March 2015 after a 1–0 loss to Ried the previous day. Andreas Ogris was appointed as head coach for the remainder of the season. Baumgartner was the fifth coach since the club sacked Karl Daxbacher in 2011 and the 31st coach since 1990.

=== Austria Salzburg ===
On 18 December 2015, Baumgartner was unveiled as the new head coach and sports director of Austria Salzburg. He finished the first season with a record of three wins, five draws, and nine losses in 17 matches.

=== SV Mattersburg ===
Baumgartner was appointed as the new manager of SV Mattersburg on 2 January 2017 bringing with him the greek defender Angelos Bountalis and a couple of other players.

== Coaching record ==
As of 26 May 2016.

Team	From	To	Record								
Team	From	To	M	W	D	L	GF	GA	GD	Win %	Ref.
Red Bull Salzburg (A)	8 April 2011	31 December 2011	32	20	8	4	91	37	+54	62.50	
Pasching	1 January 2012	4 September 2013	62	42	8	12	126	48	+78	67.74	
St. Pölten	5 September 2013	27 May 2014	33	16	8	9	55	44	+11	48.48	
Austria Wien	27 May 2014	22 March 2015	29	11	9	9	53	37	+16	37.93	
Austria Salzburg	18 December 2015	Present	17	3	5	9	16	30	−14	17.65	
Total			173	92	38	43	341	166	+175	53.18	—
