= 2012–13 Austrian Football Bundesliga =

101st season of top-tier football league in Austria

Austrian Football Bundesliga
- Season: 2012–13
- Dates: 21 July 2012 – 26 May 2013
- Champions: Austria Wien
- Relegated: SV Mattersburg
- Champions League: Austria Wien; Red Bull Salzburg
- Europa League: Rapid Wien; Sturm Graz
- Matches: 180
- Goals: 550 (3.06 per match)
- Top goalscorer: Philipp Hosiner (32 goals)
- Biggest home win: Red Bull Salzburg 7–0 Mattersburg
- Biggest away win: Wiener Neustadt 0–6 Red Bull Salzburg
- Highest scoring: Admira Wacker Mödling 4–6 Austria Wien

The 2012–13 Austrian Football Bundesliga was the 101st season of top-tier football in Austria. The season began on 21 July 2012 and ended on 26 May 2013, with the winter break held between 22 December 2012 and 9 February 2013.

== Teams ==
=== Stadia and locations ===
Location of teams in the 2012–13 Austrian Football Bundesliga

Team	Location	Venue	Capacity
Admira	Maria Enzersdorf	Trenkwalder Arena	12,000
Austria Wien	Vienna	Franz Horr Stadium	14,100
SV Mattersburg	Mattersburg	Pappelstadion	15,100
Rapid Wien	Vienna	Gerhard Hanappi Stadium	18,500
Red Bull Salzburg	Wals-Siezenheim	Red Bull Arena	30,188
SV Ried	Ried im Innkreis	Keine Sorgen Arena	7,680
Sturm Graz	Graz	UPC-Arena	15,400
Wacker Innsbruck	Innsbruck	Tivoli-Neu	16,008
Wiener Neustadt	Wiener Neustadt	Stadion Wiener Neustadt	7,500
Wolfsberger AC	Wolfsberg	Lavanttal-Arena	8,000

== League table ==
Pos	Team	Pld	W	D	L	GF	GA	GD	Pts	Qualification or relegation
1	Austria Wien (C)	36	25	7	4	84	31	+53	82	Qualification for the Champions League third qualifying round
2	Red Bull Salzburg	36	22	11	3	91	39	+52	77	Qualification for the Champions League third qualifying round
3	Rapid Wien	36	16	9	11	57	39	+18	57	Qualification for the Europa League third qualifying round
4	Sturm Graz	36	13	9	14	49	56	−7	48	Qualification for the Europa League second qualifying round
5	Wolfsberger AC	36	12	11	13	53	56	−3	47	
6	SV Ried	36	13	7	16	60	59	+1	46	
7	Wiener Neustadt	36	9	9	18	32	60	−28	36	
8	Wacker Innsbruck	36	11	3	22	41	75	−34	36	
9	Admira Wacker Mödling	36	9	8	19	47	68	−21	35	
10	Mattersburg (R)	36	9	8	19	36	67	−31	35	Relegation to Austrian First Football League

Source: weltfussball.de (in German)
Rules for classification: 1) points; 2) goal difference; 3) number of goals scored.
(C) Champions; (R) Relegated

== Results ==
All club will play four times against each other, twice home and twice away, for a total of 36 matches.

=== First half of season ===
Home \ Away	ADM	AWI	MAT	RWI	RBS	RIE	STU	WKR	WN	WOL
Admira Wacker Mödling		4–6	5–1	0–2	4–4	0–2	1–2	4–1	4–0	1–1
Austria Wien	1–0		3–1	2–0	0–1	6–1	0–1	2–0	3–0	1–1
Mattersburg	3–0	2–4		0–3	1–3	2–1	3–1	1–2	2–0	1–1
Rapid Wien	0–0	0–3	3–0		2–0	4–3	3–0	4–0	1–1	0–2
Red Bull Salzburg	5–0	0–0	3–2	0–2		1–1	3–2	2–0	1–1	4–1
Ried	1–1	0–1	6–1	0–2	3–1		0–1	2–0	3–1	0–2
Sturm Graz	3–2	1–1	0–0	2–1	0–2	3–1		3–0	3–1	4–1
Wacker Innsbruck	1–2	0–3	2–1	0–2	0–4	1–0	0–1		2–3	0–1
Wiener Neustadt	2–1	0–2	0–0	0–1	0–3	2–3	1–1	0–1		2–1
Wolfsberger AC	1–1	0–1	0–1	1–0	0–2	2–5	1–1	2–2	6–0	

Source: weltfussball.de (in German)
Legend: Blue = home team win; Yellow = draw; Red = away team win.

=== Second half of season ===
Home \ Away	ADM	AWI	MAT	RWI	RBS	RIE	STU	WKR	WN	WOL
Admira Wacker Mödling		0–2	1–0	0–2	1–1	0–3	3–0	4–3	1–2	0–1
Austria Wien	4–0		4–0	2–2	1–1	3–1	3–1	4–0	3–1	0–4
Mattersburg	0–1	0–4		2–0	1–2	1–0	0–0	1–2	1–0	3–1
Rapid Wien	1–1	1–2	2–2		1–3	3–0	1–1	2–1	2–0	0–0
Red Bull Salzburg	2–1	3–0	7–0	3–3		2–2	3–0	3–1	3–1	6–2
Ried	4–1	1–3	1–1	3–2	2–2		1–2	3–0	2–1	1–1
Sturm Graz	1–2	1–1	2–2	1–3	1–1	3–1		3–2	0–3	1–3
Wacker Innsbruck	3–1	0–3	2–0	1–1	2–3	2–0	2–1		1–0	2–3
Wiener Neustadt	3–0	0–0	0–0	1–0	0–6	0–0	1–0	2–2		2–0
Wolfsberger AC	0–0	3–6	1–0	2–1	1–1	1–3	3–0	2–3	1–1	

Source: weltfussball.de (in German)
Legend: Blue = home team win; Yellow = draw; Red = away team win.

== Season statistics ==
=== Top scorers ===
Rank	Player	Club	Goals
1	(Austria) Philipp Hosiner	Admira / Austria Wien	32
2	(Spain) Jonathan Soriano	Red Bull Salzburg	26
3	(Senegal) Sadio Mané	Red Bull Salzburg	16
4	(Austria) Deni Alar	Rapid Wien	15
4	(Austria) René Gartler	Ried	15
6	(United States) Terrence Boyd	Rapid Wien	13
7	(Germany) Richard Sukuta-Pasu	Sturm Graz	12
8	(Brazil) Alan	Red Bull Salzburg	11
8	(Austria) Robert Žulj	Ried	11
10	(Austria) Christian Falk	Wolfsberger AC	10
10	(Austria) Alexander Gorgon	Austria Wien	10
10	(Czech Republic) Tomáš Jun	Austria Wien	10
10	(Bosnia and Herzegovina) Mihret Topčagić	Wolfsberger AC	10

=== Hat-tricks ===
Player	For	Against	Result	Date
(Norway) Håvard Nielsen	Red Bull Salzburg	Admira	4–4	18 August 2012
(Austria) Günter Friesenbichler	Wiener Neustadt	Wacker Innsbruck	3–2	18 August 2012
(Austria) Christian Falk	Wolfsberger AC	Wiener Neustadt	6–0	15 September 2012
(Austria) Philipp Hosiner	Austria Wien	Admira	6–4	27 October 2012
(Austria) Philipp Hosiner	Austria Wien	Ried	6–1	4 November 2012
(Austria) René Gartler	Ried	Mattersburg	6–1	10 November 2012
(Austria) Deni Alar	Rapid Wien	Ried	4–3	1 December 2012
(Austria) Philipp Hosiner	Austria Wien	Wolfsberger AC	6–3	8 December 2012
(Senegal) Sadio Mané	Red Bull Salzburg	Mattersburg	7–0	15 December 2012
(Brazil) Alan	Red Bull Salzburg	Wolfsberger AC	6–2	20 April 2013
(Spain) Jonathan Soriano	Red Bull Salzburg	Wolfsberger AC	6–2	20 April 2013

== Attendances ==
#	Club	Average
1	Rapid	14,221
2	Sturm	10,682
3	Austria	9,350
4	Salzburg	8,206
5	Wacker	5,167
6	WAC	5,155
7	Mattersburg	4,949
8	Ried	4,244
9	Admira	3,286
10	Wiener Neustadt	2,761
