= Milan Vuković (footballer) =

Serbian footballer

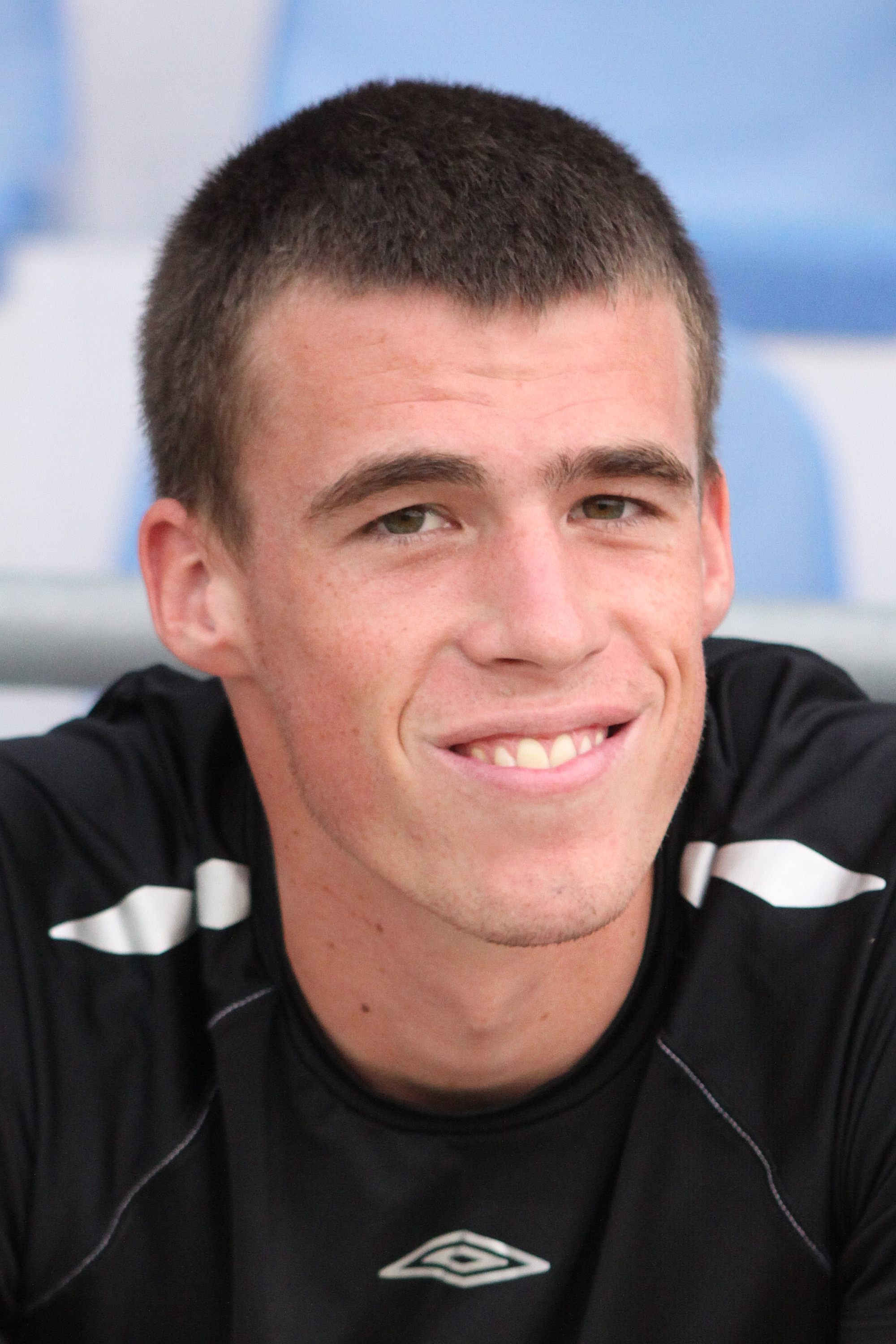

Personal information
- Full name: Milan Vuković
- Date of birth: 28 April 1988 (age 38)
- Place of birth: Belgrade, SFR Yugoslavia
- Height: 1.91 m (6 ft 3 in)
- Position: Striker

Youth career
- 1997–1998: Union Žižkov
- 1998–2001: Libuš
- 2001–2007: Slavia Prague

Senior career*
Years	Team	Apps	(Gls)
2007–2008	Slavia Prague	0	(0)
2007	→ Dukla Banská Bystrica (loan)	11	(1)
2008	→ Slavia Prague II (loan)		
2008–2012	Jablonec	24	(2)
2010	→ Kladno (loan)	8	(2)
2011	→ Vlašim (loan)	7	(1)
2013	Bonner SC	17	(12)
2013	Petržalka		
2014–2015	1. SC Sollenau	35	(18)
2015–2019	SKU Amstetten	110	(65)
2019–2020	ASKÖ Oedt	16	(10)
2020–2022	SKU Amstetten II	17	(2)
2023–2025	USV Ferschnitz	52	(32)
Total		297	(145)
- * Club domestic league appearances and goals as of 07 July 2016

Milan Vuković (Serbian Cyrillic: Милан Вуковић; born 28 April 1988) is a footballer from Serbia.
