= FC Juniors OÖ =

Austrian football club, based in Pasching

- Full name: Fußball Club Juniors OÖ
- Nickname: Schwarz-Grün (The Black-Greens)
- Founded: 16 May 2007; 19 years ago (as FC Superfund Pasching)
- Ground: voestalpine Stadion
- Capacity: 7,870
- Chairman: Franz Mayer
- Manager: Milan Vuković
- League: Regionalliga North
- 2025–26: Regionalliga Central, 4th of 16
- Website: www.fcjuniors.at
Home colours	Away colours

FC Juniors OÖ is an Austrian association football club, from Pasching, Upper Austria. It was newly founded after the move of ASKÖ Pasching, who last appeared as FC Superfund, to Carinthia and the associated renaming in SK Austria Kärnten in 2007 as FC Superfund Pasching. The greatest success of the club is winning the ÖFB-Cup as the first third division club in the history of the competition in the 2012–13 season and the associated qualification for the play-offs of the 2013–14 UEFA Europa League, in which the club was however defeated by Estoril Praia.

Since the 2014–15 season, the first men's team no longer plays independently, but under the name LASK Juniors OÖ (until 2017 SPG FC Pasching/LASK Juniors) in a syndicate with the second men's team of LASK Linz in the third-rate Regionalliga Central. With the return to the 2. Liga for the 2018–19 season, the club are again an independent team.

== History ==
=== 2007–2012: Road to the Regionalliga ===
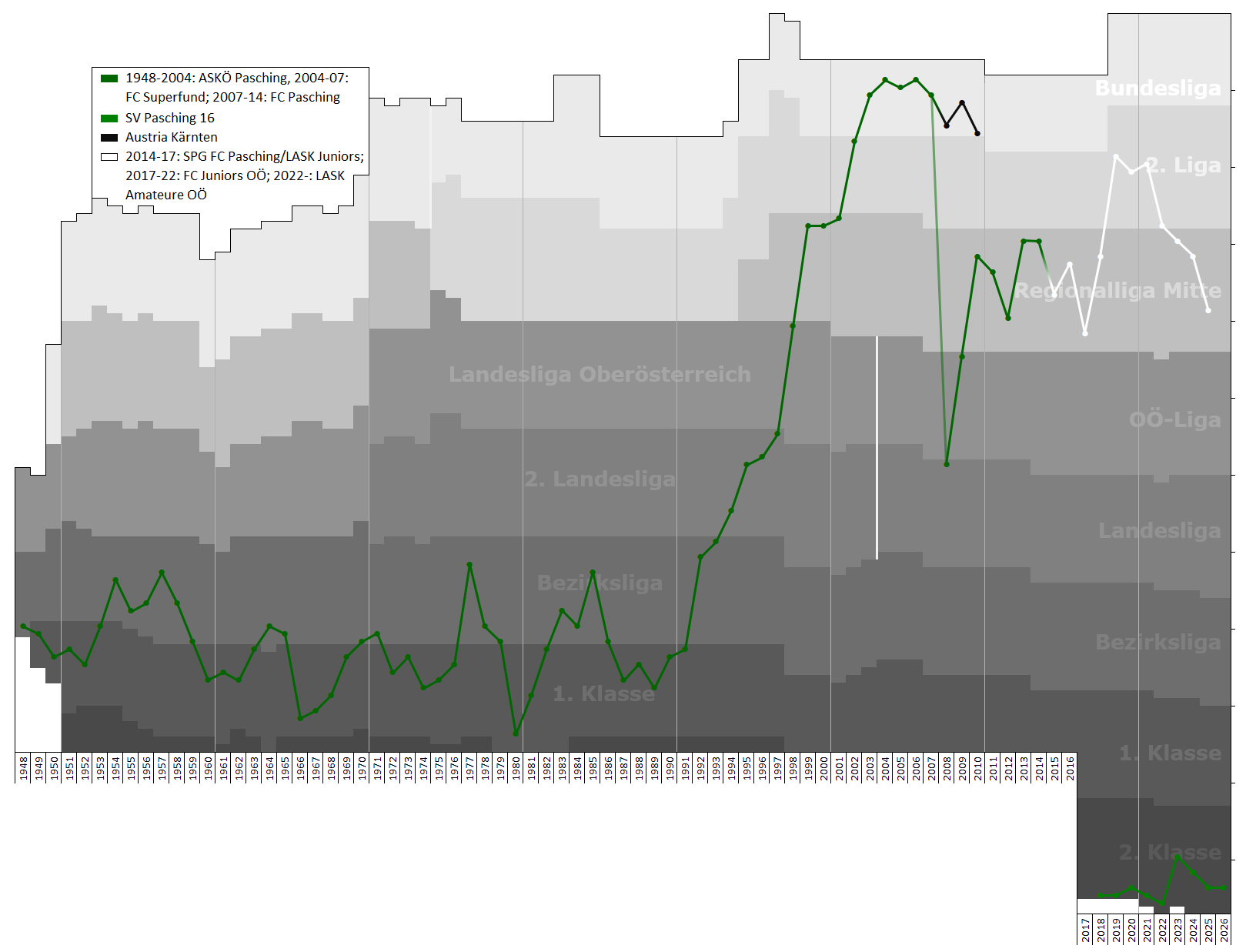
Historical chart of league performance

Logo until renamed in July 2017

The club started as a syndicate with the SV Wallern in the 2007–08 season in the fifth-highest Austrian level. After the immediate championship title and the associated promotion to the fourth division, the OÖ Liga, Wallern, restarted in the lowest league, and the club was financially compensated for the downgrade.

After the immediate title in the 2008–09 Oberösterreich Liga, the third-highest class, The FC Pasching was promoted to the Regionalliga Mitte.

In the season 2009–10, the FC Pasching had by far the highest average age of the entire Regionalliga Mitte (27.5 years). There were eleven players in the squad during this season, who had already passed the age of 30. Two of them (Josef Schicklgruber and Eduard Glieder) were already over 40 years old.

After the first round of the 2009–10 season Pasching was four points behind the leaders WAC/St. Andrä on the second place in the table. However, the club announced that it did not want to apply for a license for the First League. After the predecessor ASKÖ Pasching was relocated to Carinthia, the Bundesliga introduced a rule that prohibited a club promotion to the Erste Liga, unless it has played at least three years in a league that is played by his national association. Since the FC Pasching had played until then only one year each in the highest and second highest Upper Austrian level, the club did not meet this condition.

Pasching achieved the championship title in the Regionalliga 2010. Because of the waiver of a license application for the Erste Liga, the club was deducted 13 points. After the season, the club board resigned; a new board had to be elected.

As at the end of the season 2010–11 Superfund stepped out as the main sponsor and could not be adequately replaced, the club was forced to cut the budget for the next season massively together. Consequently, almost the entire professional squad was replaced by a new one, which consisted mainly of amateur players. At the end of the autumn season Pasching was in last place. In early 2012, a cooperation with Red Bull Salzburg was entered. The first consequence of this collaboration was the acquisition of the coaching office by Gerald Baumgartner, the former coach of the second team of Salzburg. The club managed thanks to an 8–0 victory in the last game against the already established as a champion Grazer AK the league.

=== 2012–2014: Cup win and decline ===
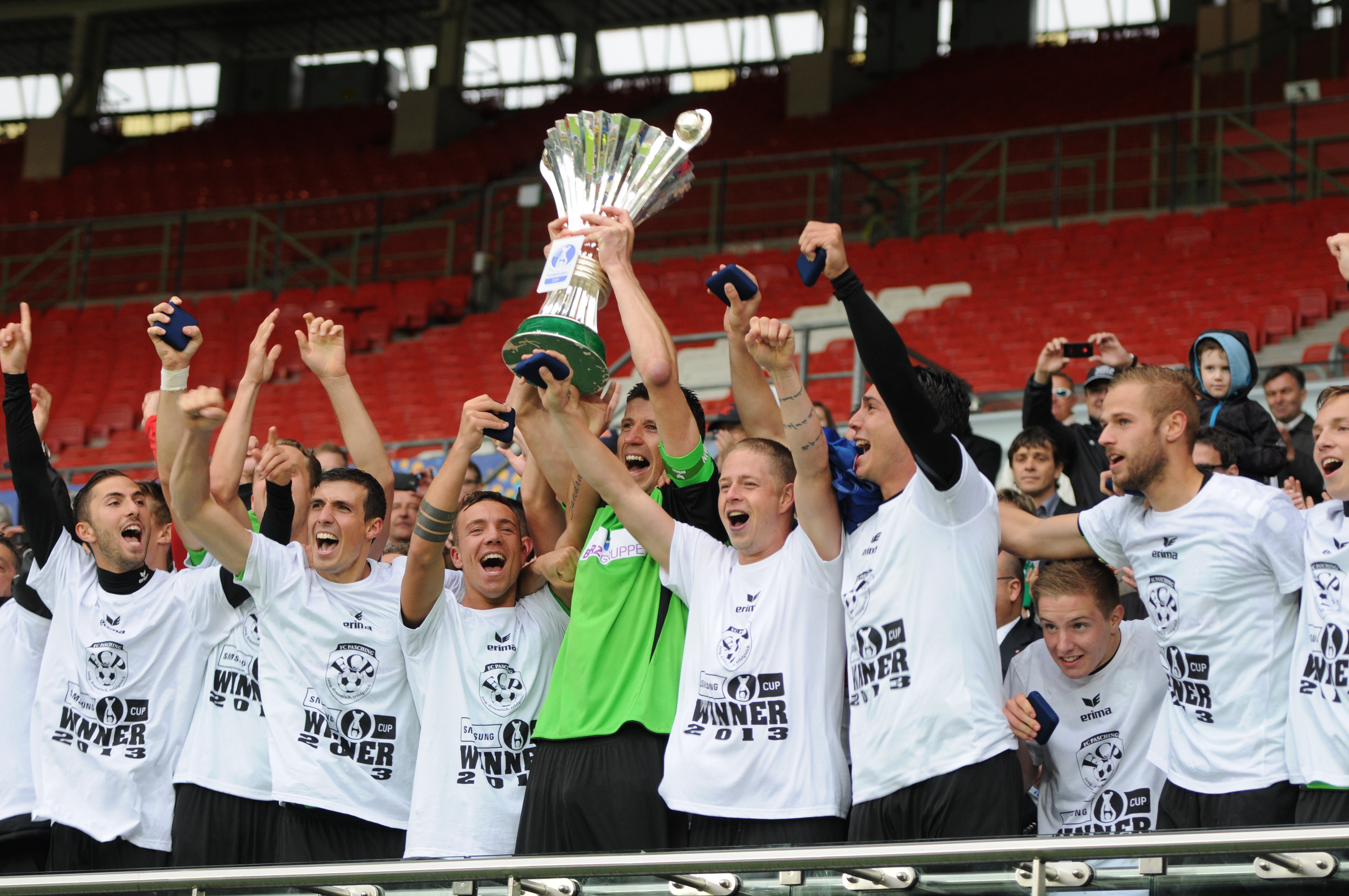
FC Pasching – Cup Winners 2012–13

In the 2012–13 season, Pasching was back at the other end of the table. The team won the autumn championship and went into the winter break four points ahead of LASK Linz. However, this advantage was lost in the spring and Pasching finished the season two points behind Linz in second place.

In the 2012–13 Austrian Cup, Pasching achieved the biggest sensation in the history of the competition. After Austria Salzburg, Austria Lustenau and Austria Klagenfurt were eliminated in the first three rounds, the elite of Austrian football waited for the regional league team in the last three rounds. In the quarter finals, Pasching beat Rapid Wien 1–0 away from home. In the semi-final, they faced cooperation partner Red Bull Salzburg away from home and turned a 0–1 deficit into a 2–1 victory, becoming the first team from the third division to reach the final of the ÖFB Cup in its 94-year history. The opponent in the final at the Ernst-Happel-Stadion in Vienna was Austria Wien. Daniel Sobkova scored shortly after half time giving Pasching a 1–0 lead, which they defended to win the final. Thus, FC Pasching defeated the champion, the runner-up and third team in the Bundesliga season 2012–13, without ever having had the home advantage for themselves. The Cup victory saw the Upper Austrians qualify for the 2013–14 UEFA Europa League play-off round, where they met the Portuguese club Estoril Praia and lost with two defeats.

In early September 2013, coach Gerald Baumgartner moved to SKN St. Pölten and the former co-coach Martin Hiden took over the team. In the 2013–14 Austrian Cup, Pasching beat Bundesliga side, FC Wacker Innsbruck, in the second round before they lost against Wolfsberger AC on penalties in the third round. In the championship, the season goal of winning the championship was missed, with LASK finishing in first place again.

=== 2014–2018: Syndicate with LASK and renaming ===
Even before that it became clear that Red Bull would leave Pasching as a sponsor. As a result, the club entered into a cooperation with LASK, which meant joint youth-team work and the use of the Pasching training center by LASK Linz. After promotion and the return of LASK to professional football, it was announced in June 2014 that FC Pasching – in the 2014–15 season under the name SPG FC Pasching/LASK Juniors – would compete in a syndicate with the second team of the Linz club. Associated with this was the replacement of the entire squad and the loss of a separate team. The syndicate club were not eligible for promotion.

In the debut season of the syndicate, the team in the third-tier Regionalliga gained 43 points to finish 9th place in the table. In the 2015–16 season, the team was able to improve their point yield and finished with 50 points in 5th place. In the 2016–17 season, the syndicate won only 31 points and finished just one place above the relegation zone in 14th.

Before the 2017–18 season, the syndicate was realigned to better attract talent from Upper Austria. In July 2017, FC Pasching was renamed FC Juniors OÖ. The syndicate changed its name to LASK Juniors OÖ. In addition, the former hobby club SV Pasching 16 was incorporated into the FC Juniors OÖ and since then formed the second team, which plays under the name SV Pasching 16 OÖ Juniors in the eighth-tier 2. Klasse Nord-Ost.

=== Since 2018: Present ===
After the rise of LASK Juniors OÖ in the 2. Liga in the 2017–18 season, the syndicate is dissolved. The FC Juniors OÖ will play as an independent club in the second league, but continue to cooperate with the LASK.

== Past seasons ==
=== FC Pasching ===
Season	League	Place	Pld	W	D	L	GF	GA	GD	Pts	Austrian Cup
2007–08	Landesliga West (V)	1	26	23	2	1	77	18	59	71	Did not qualify
2008–09	OÖ Liga (V)	1	26	21	2	3	76	17	59	65	1st round
2009–10	Regionalliga Mitte (III)	4	30	17	9	4	77	24	53	50	2nd round
2010–11	Regionalliga Mitte (III)	6	30	11	12	7	38	33	5	45	1st round
2011–12	Regionalliga Mitte (III)	12	30	10	8	12	41	40	1	38	1st round
2012–13	Regionalliga Mitte (III)	2	28	21	3	4	64	19	45	66	Champions
2013–14	Regionalliga Mitte (III)	2	30	21	6	3	79	20	59	69	1st round
Green marks a season followed by promotion

=== LASK Juniors OÖ ===
Season	League	Place	Pld	W	D	L	GF	GA	GD	Pts	Austrian Cup
2014–15	Regionalliga Mitte (III)	9	30	12	7	11	46	49	−3	43	Did not qualify
2015–16	Regionalliga Mitte (III)	5	30	15	5	10	59	45	14	50	Did not qualify
2016–17	Regionalliga Mitte (III)	14	30	8	7	15	43	49	−6	31	Did not qualify
2017–18	Regionalliga Mitte (III)	4	30	16	4	10	54	46	8	52	Did not qualify
Green marks a season followed by promotion

=== FC Juniors OÖ ===
Season	League	Place	Pld	W	D	L	GF	GA	GD	Pts	Austrian Cup
2018–19	2. Liga (II)										
Green marks a season followed by promotion

== Honours ==
=== League ===
- Austrian 2. Landesliga (V)
  - Winners (1): 2008–09

=== Cup ===
- Austrian Cup
  - Winners (1): 2012–13

== European competition history ==
As of 2 June 2018

Competition	Pld	W	D	L	GF	GA	GD	Win%
UEFA Cup / UEFA Europa League	2	0	0	2	1	4	−3	0.00
Total	2	0	0	2	1	4	−3	0.00

=== Results ===
Season	Competition	Round	Club	Home	Away	Aggregate
2013–14	UEFA Europa League	Play-off round	(Portugal) Estoril Praia	1–2	0–2	1–4

Source: UEFA.com, Last updated on 8 March 2018
Pld = Matches played; W = Matches won; D = Matches drawn; L = Matches lost; GF = Goals for; GA = Goals against; GD = Goal Difference.

== Players ==
=== Current squad ===
As of 9 September 2026

Note: Flags indicate national team as defined under FIFA eligibility rules; some limited exceptions apply. Players may hold more than one non-FIFA nationality.

No.	Pos.	Nation	Player
1	GK	AUT	Christof Katzmayr
2	DF	USA	Kaden DeJarnette
5	DF	GER	Sammy Mohammad
6	DF	USA	Amin Ibrahim
9	FW	CAN	Oumar Diallo
11	MF	AUT	Tarik Brkic
14	MF	AUT	Jonas Ilk
15	MF	MLI	Mohamed Sanogo
17	DF	AUT	Armin Midzic
20	DF	AUT	Luca Ortner
21	DF	SEN	Alpha Baldé
22	FW	AUT	Lukas Bozsoki
23	MF	AUT	Ryan Rodriguez German
24	DF	AUT	Kevin Lebersorger
25	FW	MLI	Idrissa Diakité

No.	Pos.	Nation	Player
26	FW	USA	Peyton Presson
27	MF	CRO	Mate Ivković
28	FW	AUT	Paul Krapf
29	DF	AUT	Jakob Wansch
31	GK	AUT	Aldino Turbic
40	MF	AUT	Luka Miksch
42	FW	CAN	Naël Kane
45	DF	CRO	Patrik Perić
46	FW	AUT	Matthias Hartl
49	MF	AUT	Fabian Jindra
66	DF	AUT	Alan Wimmer
77	GK	SUI	Damian Corbisiero
—	GK	AUT	Fabian Schillinger
—	MF	SEN	Birane Cissé
—	FW	MNE	Filip Perović

=== Out on loan ===
Note: Flags indicate national team as defined under FIFA eligibility rules; some limited exceptions apply. Players may hold more than one non-FIFA nationality.

No. / Pos. / Nation / Player; — / DF / AUT / Yanis Traun (at St. Pölten)	No. / Pos. / Nation / Player; — / FW / AUT / Jakob Wanker (at Hertha Wels)

=== Coaching staff ===
As of 9 September 2026

Position	Staff
Head coach	(Serbia) Milan Vuković
Assistant coach	(Austria) Manfred Razenböck
Assistant coach	(Austria) Jürgen Panis
Assistant coach	(Germany) Petar Filipović
Goalkeeping coach	(Austria) Christoph Riegler
Individual coach	(Spain) Bernat Mosquera

== Managerial history ==
- (Austria) Helmut Wartinger (2007–2010)
- (Austria) Rudolf Geir (2010–2011)
- (Bosnia and Herzegovina) Fuad Djulic (interim) (2011)
- (Austria) Erwin Spiegel (2011)
- (Romania) Sandu Bors (interim) (2011)
- (Austria) Adolf Pinter (2011)
- (Austria) Gerald Baumgartner (2012–2013)
- (Austria) Martin Hiden (2013–2015)
- (Austria) Mario Messner (2015)
- (Austria) Ronald Brunmayr (2015–2016)
- (Austria) Gerald Scheiblehner (2019–2021)
- (Austria) Andreas Wieland (2021)
- (Austria) Stefan Hirczy (2021)
- (Austria) Manuel Takacs (2021–2022)
- (Austria) Patrick Enengl (2022–2023)
- (Austria) Thomas Bachmair (2023)
- (Serbia) Luka Pavlović (2023–2024)
- (Serbia) Radovan Krivokapić (2024)
- (Austria) Andreas Wieland (2025–2026)
- (Serbia) Milan Vuković (2026–)
