= 2012–13 FC Admira Wacker Mödling season =

Admira Wacker Mödling
2012–13 season
- Chairman: Richard Trenkwalder
- Manager: Dietmar Kühbauer
- Stadium: Trenkwalder Arena, Maria Enzersdorf, Lower Austria
- Europa League: Third qualifying round

The 2012–13 FC Admira Wacker Mödling season is the 100th season in club history. In the 2011–12 Bundesliga, Admira qualified for the Second qualifying round of the 2012–13 UEFA Europa League.

== Matches ==
=== Legend ===
Win Draw Loss Postponed

=== Bundesliga ===
==== League results and fixtures ====
22 July 2012 1	Admira Wacker Mödling	0–2	SV Ried	Maria Enzersdorf
16:00 CET	Sulimani (yellow card) 46'; Drescher (yellow card) 66'; Windbichler (yellow card) 77' (yellow-red card) 89'; Mevoungou (yellow card) 89'; Schrott (yellow card) 90+3'	Report	14', 19' Gartler; (yellow card) 87' Schicker	Stadium: Bundesstadion Südstadt; Attendance: 2.400; Referee: Christian Dintar; Assistant referees: Alain Hoxha; Roland Braunschmidt; Fourth official: Harald Lechner

29 July 2012 2	Wacker Innsbruck	1–2	Admira Wacker Mödling	Innsbruck
16:00 CET	Schreter 16'; Simon Piesinger (yellow card) 27'; Švejnoha (yellow card) 42'; Christoph Saurer (yellow card) 44'; Marcelo Fernandes (yellow card) 45+3'; Carlos Merino (yellow card) 78'	Report	14', 81' (yellow card) 41' Hosiner; Sulimani (yellow card) 39'; (yellow card) 74' Schick	Stadium: Tivoli-Neu; Attendance: 5.100; Referee: Robert Schörgenhofer; Assistant referees: Roland Riedel; Michael Baumann; Fourth official: Christopher Jäger

5 August 2012 3	Admira Wacker Mödling	4–0	SC Wiener Neustadt	Maria Enzersdorf
18:30 CET	Ouédraogo 17', 24'; Thürauer (yellow card) 33'; Hosiner 72'; Schicker (yellow card) 81'; Sabitzer 84'	Summary	Offenbacher (yellow card) 37'	Stadium: Bundesstadion Südstadt; Attendance: 1,969; Referee: Oliver Drachta; Assistant referees: Roland Brandner; Sebastien Gishamer; Fourth official: Bernd Eigler

12 August 2012 4	Austria Wien	1–0	Admira Wacker Mödling	Vienna
18:30 CET	Stanković 61'; Šimkovič (yellow card) 78'	Summary	Mevoungou (yellow card) 27'; Drescher (yellow card) 75'; Sulimani (yellow card) 81'; Windbichler (yellow card) 90'	Stadium: Franz Horr Stadium; Attendance: 8,350; Referee: Manfred Krassnitzer; Assistant referees: Andreas Witschnigg; Daniel Trampusch; Fourth official: Christian Dintar

18 August 2012 5	Admira Wacker Mödling	4–4	Red Bull Salzburg	Maria Enzersdorf
18:30 CET	Hosiner 15', 45'; Sabitzer (yellow card) 35' (goal) 37'; Plassnegger (yellow card) 51'; Schicker 80'; Schwab (yellow card) 90'; Windbichler (yellow card) 90+1'	Summary	Nielsen 45+2', 47', 50'; Hierländer (yellow card) 61'; Maierhofer 77'; Walke (yellow card) 90+1'; Mendes da Silva (yellow card) 90+2'	Stadium: Bundesstadion Südstadt; Attendance: 3,212; Referee: Alexander Harkam; Assistant referees: Richard Hübler; Christian-Petru Ciochirca; Fourth official: Andreas Kollegger

25 August 2012 6	SK Sturm Graz	3–2	Admira Wacker Mödling	Graz
18:30 CET	Sukuta-Pasu 24', 73'; Vujadinović 42'; Weber (yellow card) 77'	Summary	Windbichler (yellow card) 27'; Mevoungou (yellow card) 50'; Thürauer 54'; Bukva 60' (o.g.); Schicker (yellow card) 89'; Schrott (yellow card) 90'	Stadium: UPC-Arena; Attendance: 8,468; Referee: Gerhard Grobelnik; Assistant referees: Andreas Heidenreich; Maximillian Kolbitsch; Fourth official: Manfred Krassnitzer

1 September 2012 7	Admira Wacker Mödling	1–1	Wolfsberger AC	Maria Enzersdorf
18:30 CET	Schicker 64' (yellow card) 90+4'; Thürauer (yellow card) 66'; Pöllhuber (yellow card) 85'	Summary	Jacobo 39'; Stückler (yellow card) 72'; Dobnik (yellow card) 90+4'	Stadium: Bundesstadion Südstadt; Attendance: 2,278; Referee: Harald Lechner; Assistant referees: Alain Hoxha; Gerd Adanitsch; Fourth official: Bernd Eigler

15 September 2012 8	SK Rapid Wien	0–0	Admira Wacker Mödling	Vienna
18:30 CET	Trimmel (yellow card) 16'; Ildiz (yellow card) 30'	Summary	Schwab (yellow card) 24'; Palla (yellow card) 25'; Thürauer (yellow card) 54'; Ouédraogo (yellow card) 56'; Schicker (yellow card) 90'	Stadium: Gerhard Hanappi Stadium; Attendance: 16,100; Referee: Alaexander Harkam; Assistant referees: Richard Hübler; Christian-Petru Ciochirca; Fourth official: Christian Dintar

22 September 2012 9	Admira Wacker Mödling	5–1	SV Mattersburg	Maria Enzersdorf
18:30 CET	Schrott 2' (yellow card) 8'; Ouédraogo 29'; Thürauer 36'; Pöllhuber (yellow card) 53'; Schick 57'; Schicker 90+1'	Summary	Rodler (yellow card) 22' (yellow-red card) 64'; Potzmann 26'	Stadium: Bundesstadion Südstadt; Attendance: 2,830; Referee: Gerhard Grobelnik; Assistant referees: Maximillian Kolbitsch; Andreas Heidenreich; Fourth official: Julian Weinberger

29 September 2012 10	SV Ried	1–1	Admira Wacker Mödling	Ried im Innkreis
18:30 CET	Walch (yellow card) 38'; Reifeltshammer (yellow card) 63'; Riegler (yellow card) 63'; Žulj 88'	Summary	Pöllhuber (yellow card) 22'; Schick (yellow card) 39'; Schachner (yellow card) 41'; Schwab 64' (pen.)	Stadium: Keine Sorgen Arena; Attendance: 4,457; Referee: Dominik Ouschan; Assistant referees: Matthias Winsauer; Johannes König; Fourth official: Andreas Kollegger

6 October 2012 11	Admira Wacker Mödling	4–1	FC Wacker Innsbruck	Maria Enzersdorf
18:30 CET	Schick 11'; Ouédraogo 24'; Schwab 47' (yellow card) 78'; Sabitzer 90+2'	Summary	Carlos Merino (yellow card) 3'; Abrahám (red card) 5'; Kofler (yellow card) 40'; Schütz 76'	Stadium: Bundesstadion Südstadt; Attendance: 3,068; Referee: Thomas Prammer; Assistant referees: Roland Brander; Stefan Kühr; Fourth official: Andreas Feichtinger

20 October 2012 12	SC Wiener Neustadt	2–1	Admira Wacker Mödling	Wiener Neustadt
18:30 CET	Hinka (yellow card) 34'; Wallner 63'; Stefan Rakowitz 68' (yellow card) 78'	Summary	Schick 22' (yellow card) 31'; Palla (yellow card) 76'; Windbichler (yellow card) 89'	Stadium: Stadion Wiener Neustadt; Attendance: 5,600; Referee: Manfred Krassnitzer; Assistant referees: Andreas Witschnigg; Stefan Krassnitzer; Fourth official: Philipp Aiginger

27 October 2012 13	Admira Wacker Mödling	4–6	FK Austria Wien	Maria Enzersdorf
18:30 CET	Schick 25'; Schachner 32'; Thürauer (yellow card) 40' (goal) 45+1'; Schwab 82' (pen.); Ouédraogo (yellow card) 88'	Summary	Hosiner 2', 90', 90+3'; Holland (yellow card) 22'; Šimkovič 29' (yellow card) 48'; Rogulj 51'; Gorgon 60'; Grünwald (yellow card) 76'; Suttner (yellow card) 89'	Stadium: Bundesstadion Südstadt; Attendance: 4,950; Referee: Dieter Muckenhammer; Assistant referees: Roland Brandner; Andreas Rothmann; Fourth official: Thomas Prammer

3 November 2012 14	FC Red Bull Salzburg	5–0	Admira Wacker Mödling	Wals-Siezenheim
18:30 CET	Leitgeb 24', 89'; Jonathan Soriano 27', 74'; Windbichler 86' (o.g.); Valentino Lazaro (yellow card) 88'	Summary	Windbichler (yellow card) 15'; Plassnegger (yellow card) 24'; Schick (yellow card) 52'	Stadium: Red Bull Arena; Attendance: 6,408; Referee: Sascha Amhof; Assistant referees: Bruno Zurbrügg; Devis Dettamanti; Fourth official: Oliver Drachta

10 November 2012 15	Admira Wacker Mödling	1–2	SK Sturm Graz	Maria Enzersdorf
16:00 CET	Ouédraogo (yellow card) 57'; Sulimani 90+2'	Summary	Vujadinović 41' (yellow card) 82'; Kaufmann (yellow card) 44'; Okotie 47'; Madl (yellow card) 65'	Stadium: Bundesstadion Südstadt; Attendance: 3,857; Referee: Oliver Drachta; Assistant referees: Stefan Kühr; Clemens Schüttengruber; Fourth official: Manuel Schüttengruber

17 November 2012 16	Wolfsberger AC	1–1	Admira Wacker Mödling	Wolfsberg, Carinthia
18:30 CET	Liendl 20'; Sollbauer (yellow card) 39'; Solano (yellow card) 43'; Putsche (yellow card) 55'; Kerhe (yellow card) 89'	Summary	Plassnegger (yellow card) 37'; Thürauer (yellow card) 58'; Sulimani 61'	Stadium: Lavanttal-Arena; Attendance: 4,350; Referee: Manuel Schüttengruber; Assistant referees: Stefan Kühr; Roland Riedel; Fourth official: Sebastian Gishamer

25 November 2012 17	Admira Wacker Mödling	0–2	SK Rapid Wien	Maria Enzersdorf
15:30 CET	Auer (yellow card) 16'; Windbichler (yellow card) 22'; Seger (yellow card) 89'; Schrott (yellow card) 90'	Summary	Schimpelsberger (yellow card) 22'; Wydra (yellow card) 31'; Alar (yellow card) 64' (goal) 70' (pen.); Burgstaller (yellow card) 85' (goal) 90+2'; Kulovits (yellow card) 90'	Stadium: Bundesstadion Südstadt; Attendance: 6,122; Referee: Manfred Krassnitzer; Assistant referees: Andreas Witschnigg; Stefan Krassnitzer; Fourth official: Christian Dintar

1 December 2012 18	SV Mattersburg	3–0	Admira Wacker Mödling	Mattersburg
18:30 CET	Naumoski 45' (pen.); Bürger 47', 79'	Summary	Schrott (yellow card) 33'; Tischler (red card) 43'	Stadium: Pappelstadion; Attendance: 2,477; Referee: Rene Eisner; Assistant referees: Richard Hübler; Petru Ciochira; Fourth official: Andreas Kollegger

8 December 2012 19	Admira Wacker Mödling	0–3	SV Ried	Maria Enzersdorf
16:00 CET	Toth (yellow card) 7'; Thürauer (yellow card) 28'; Drescher (yellow card) 75'; Schwab (yellow card) 79'; Schicker (yellow card) 87'	Summary	Meilinger 2' (yellow card) 86'; Žulj 20'; Walch (yellow card) 39'; Gartler 41'; Hadžić (yellow card) 73'	Stadium: Bundesstadion Südstadt; Attendance: 1,650; Referee: Christian Dintar; Assistant referees: Roland Braunschmidt; Gerald Bauemfeind; Fourth official: Andreas Kollegger

15 December 2012 20	Wacker Innsbruck	3–1	Admira Wacker Mödling	Innsbruck
18:30 CET	Đaković (yellow card) 16'; Wallner 21', 56'; Bergmann 36'; Wernitznig (yellow card) 53'; Abrahám (yellow card) 67'; Saurer (yellow card) 90'	Summary	Toth (yellow card) 25'; Seeger (yellow card) 43'; Palla (yellow card) 55'; Schrott (yellow card) 56'; Maximilian Sax 69'; Plassnegger (yellow card) 74' (yellow-red card); Thürauer (yellow card) 89'	Stadium: Tivoli-Neu; Attendance: 3,956; Referee: Robert Schörgenhofer; Assistant referees: Michael Baumann; Johannes König; Fourth official: Christopher Jäger

16 February 2013 21	Admira Wacker Mödling	1–2	SC Wiener Neustadt	Maria Enzersdorf
18:30 CET	Ouédraogo 38'; Schwab (yellow card) 44'; Thürauer (yellow card) 63'	Summary	Hlinka 48' (pen.); Tadić 51'	Stadium: Bundesstadion Südstadt; Attendance: 1,500; Referee: Manfred Krassnitzer; Assistant referees: Andreas Witschnigg; Daniel Trampusch; Fourth official: Helmut Trampusch

23 February 2013 22	FK Austria Wien	4–0	Admira Wacker Mödling	Vienna
18:30 CET	Gorgon 31'; Stanković (yellow card) 60'; Dilaver 79'; Kienast 89' (pen.) 90'	Summary	Plassnegger (yellow card) 22'; Ouédraogo (yellow card) 42'; Thomas Ebner (yellow card) 54'; Ježek (yellow card) 78'; Drescher (yellow card) 88'; Macho (yellow card) 89'	Stadium: Franz Horr Stadium; Attendance: 8,812; Referee: Thomas Prammer; Assistant referees: Andreas Rothmann; Clemens Schüttengruber; Fourth official: Manuel Schüttengruber

27 February 2013 23	Admira Wacker Mödling	1–1	Red Bull Salzburg	Maria Enzersdorf
18:30 CET	Seebacher (yellow card) 13' (yellow-red card); Alberto Malagón Amate 44'; Schachner (yellow card) 69'	Summary	Ilsanker (yellow card) 14'; Leitgeb 16'; Schiemer (yellow card) 45'; Ulmer (yellow card) 67'; Vorsah (yellow card) 76'; Klein (yellow card) 88'	Stadium: Bundesstadion Südstadt; Attendance: 1,100; Referee: Christian Dintar; Assistant referees: Roland Braunschmidt; Julian Weinberger; Fourth official: Harald Lechner

2 March 2013 24	Sturm Graz	1–2	Admira Wacker Mödling	Graz
16:00 CET	Madl (yellow card) 74'; David Schloffer 78'	Summary	Schößwendter (yellow card) 1'; Alberto Malagón Amate (yellow card) 47'; Schwab (yellow card) 47' (goal) 75'; Focher 69' (o.g.); Palla (yellow card) 70'	Stadium: UPC-Arena; Attendance: 8,700; Referee: Oliver Drachta; Assistant referees: Stefan Stangl; Daniel Trampusch; Fourth official: Manuel Schüttengruber

9 March 2013 25	Admira Wacker Mödling	0–1	Wolfsberger AC	Maria Enzersdorf
18:30 CET	Seebacher (yellow card) 23'; Plassnegger (yellow card) 29'; Ouédraogo (yellow card) 40'; Palla (yellow card) 84'	Summary	Topčagić (yellow card) 2'; Polverino (yellow card) 32'; Suppan (yellow card) 68'; Rubén Rivera Corral 75'	Stadium: Bundesstadion Südstadt; Attendance: 1,500; Referee: Manuel Schüttengruber; Assistant referees: Stefan Kühr; Roland Riedel; Fourth official: Julian Weinberger

16 March 2013 26	SK Rapid Wien	1–1	Admira Wacker Mödling	Vienna
16:00 CET	Wydra (yellow card) 22'; Boyd (yellow card) 23'; Pichler 53'	Summary	Ouédraogo 57'; Tito (yellow card) 68'; Toth (yellow card) 77'	Stadium: Gerhard Hanappi Stadium; Attendance: 10,900; Referee: (Austria) Dominik Ouschan

30 March 2013 27	Admira Wacker Mödling	1–0	SV Mattersburg	Maria Enzersdorf
16:00 CET	Schwab 32' (yellow card) 55'	Summary	Pöllhuber (yellow card) 52'; Mravac (yellow card) 59'	Stadium: Bundesstadion Südstadt; Attendance: 2,444; Referee: (Switzerland) Stephan Klossner

6 April 2013 28	SV Ried	4–1	Admira Wacker Mödling	Ried im Innkreis
18:30 CET	Meilinger 3'; Hinum 26'; Gartler (yellow card) 34'; Žulj 50', 55'; Walch (red card) 75'; Hammerer (yellow card) 89'	Summary	Toth (yellow card) 9'; Plassnegger (yellow card) 33'; Palla (yellow card) 70'; Schwab 77' (pen.); Ouédraogo (yellow card) 80'; Auer (yellow card) 87'	Stadium: Keine Sorgen Arena; Attendance: 4,300; Referee: (Austria) Alexander Harkam

13 April 2013 29	Admira Wacker Mödling	4–3	Wacker Innsbruck	Maria Enzersdorf
18:30 CET	Schößwendter 9'; Thomas Ebner (yellow card) 31'; Daniel Lucas Segovia 37', 63' (yellow card) 63'; Windbichler 60' (yellow card) 64'; Ouédraogo (yellow card) 66'	Summary	Lukas Hinterseer 3' (yellow card) 27'; Schütz 46'; Perstaller 90+2'	Stadium: Bundesstadion Südstadt; Attendance: 2,000; Referee: (Austria) Robert Schörgenhofer

20 April 2013 30	Wiener Neustadt	3–0	Admira Wacker Mödling	Wiener Neustadt
18:30 CET	Ramsebner 41' (yellow card) 83'; Herbert Rauter (yellow card) 50'; Mimm 81', 90'	Summary	Ouédraogo (yellow card) 36'; Palla (yellow card) 42' (yellow-red card); Macho (red card) 49'; Drescher (yellow card) 73'; Sulimani (yellow card) 82'	Stadium: Stadion Wiener Neustadt; Attendance: 4,200; Referee: (Austria) Harald Lechner

==== League table ====
===== Overall league table =====
Pos	Team	Pld	W	D	L	GF	GA	GD	Pts	Qualification or relegation
6	SV Ried	36	13	7	16	60	59	+1	46	
7	Wiener Neustadt	36	9	9	18	32	60	−28	36	
8	Wacker Innsbruck	36	11	3	22	41	75	−34	36	
9	Admira Wacker Mödling	36	9	8	19	47	68	−21	35	
10	Mattersburg (R)	36	9	8	19	36	67	−31	35	Relegation to Austrian First Football League

Source: weltfussball.de (in German)
Rules for classification: 1) points; 2) goal difference; 3) number of goals scored.
(R) Relegated

===== Summary table =====
Overall								Home						Away					
Pld	W	D	L	GF	GA	GD	Pts	W	D	L	GF	GA	GD	W	D	L	GF	GA	GD
21	4	5	12	32	44	−12	17	3	2	6	24	24	0	1	3	6	8	20	−12

Last updated: 16 February 2013.
Source: bundesliga.at (Home) and bundesliga.at (Away)

=== ÖFB-Cup ===
13 July 2012 1st Round	SC Parndorf	0–3	Admira Wacker Mödling	Parndorf
19:00		Match Report	34', 50' Hosiner; 34' (pen.) Sulimani	Stadium: Heidebodenstadion; Attendance: 900; Referee: A. Hoxha

25 September 2012 2nd Round	Austria Klagenfurt	2–0 (a.e.t.)	Admira Wacker Mödling	Klagenfurt
19:00	Pusztai (yellow card) 18'; Boris Hüttenbrenner (yellow card) 55'; Dollinger (yellow card) 56' (goal) 118'; Christoph Mattes (yellow card) 61'; Thierry Fidjeu 115'	Summary	Schwab (yellow card) 39'; Schick (yellow card) 68'; Benjamin Freudenthaler (yellow card) 102'; Drescher (yellow card) 117'	Stadium: Hypo-Arena; Attendance: 600; Referee: Sebastian Gishamer

=== UEFA Europa League ===
==== Qualifying rounds ====
===== Second qualifying round =====
19 July 2012 1st Leg	(Lithuania) Žalgiris Vilnius	1–1	(Austria) Admira Wacker Mödling	Vilnius, Lithuania
19:30 CET	Radavičius 72' (yellow card) 89'; Elliot (yellow card) 79'; Egidijus Vaitkūnas (yellow card) 90+5'	Report	12' Hosiner; (yellow card) 77' Windbichler	Stadium: LFF stadium Attendance: 2.473; Referee: M. Courtney

26 July 2012 2nd Leg	(Austria) Admira Wacker Mödling	5–1 (6–2 agg.)	(Lithuania) Žalgiris Vilnius	Maria Enzersdorf, Austria
21:05 CET	Schwab 4' (yellow card) 35'; Ježek 14' (pen.) 52'; Ouédraogo (yellow card) 19' (goal) 31'; Hosiner 70'; Toth (yellow card) 72'	Report	Jankauskas (yellow card) 13'; 22' Mantas Kuklys	Stadium: Trenkwalder Arena; Attendance: 3.980; Referee: Leontios Trattou

===== Third qualifying round =====
2 August 2012 1st Leg	(Austria) Admira Wacker Mödling	0–2	(Czech Republic) Sparta Prague	Maria Enzersdorf, Austria
21:05 CET	Schwab (yellow card) 48'; Philipp Hosiner (yellow card) 65'	Summary	Mevoungou 29' (o.g.); Kweuke 58'; Kadlec (yellow card) 64'	Stadium: Trenkwalder Arena; Attendance: 5,000; Referee: (Sweden) Martin Hansson

8 August 2012 2nd Leg	(Czech Republic) Sparta Prague	2–2 (4–2 agg.)	(Austria) Admira Wacker Mödling	Prague, Czech Republic
20:00	Kweuke 36', 39'; Kadeřábek (yellow card) 78'	Summary	Thürauer 19'; Plassnegger (yellow card) 52'; Sulimani 69'; Schrott (yellow card) 80'	Stadium: Generali Arena; Attendance: 8,732; Referee: (Italy) Luca Banti
