= 2012–13 SK Sturm Graz season =

Sturm Graz
2012–13 season
- Chairman: Christian Jauk
- Manager: Peter Hyballa
- Stadium: UPC-Arena, Graz, Styria
- ÖFB-Cup: Entering into 1st Round

The 2012–13 SK Sturm Graz season is the 104th season in club history.

== Review and events ==
Peter Hyballa was hired as new coach of Sturm Graz on 16 May 2012. He takes over on 5 June 2012 when pre-season begins. Sporting Director Paul Gludovatz is on indefinite sick leave as of 22 May 2012. Gludovatz's contract was eventually dissolved by mutual consent.

== Matches ==
=== Legend ===
Win Draw Loss Postponed

=== Bundesliga ===
==== League results and appearances ====
21 July 2012 1	Sturm Graz	0–2	Red Bull Salzburg	Graz
16:00 CET	Säumel (yellow card) 31'; Weber (yellow card) 68'; Kröpfl (yellow card) 75'	Report	Ilsanker (yellow card) 7' (yellow-red card) 56'; Soriano 11', 22'; Schiemer (yellow card) 18'; Ulmer (yellow card) 90'	Stadium: UPC-Arena; Attendance: 13,085; Referee: (Austria) Oliver Drachta

28 July 2012 2	Austria Wien	0–1	Sturm Graz	Vienna
18:30 CET	Margreitter (yellow card) 61' (yellow-red card) 90'	Report	Vujadinović (yellow card) 18'; Okotie 25'	Stadium: Generali Arena; Attendance: 10,125; Referee: (Austria) Manuel Schüttengruber

4 August 2012 3	SV Mattersburg	3–1	Sturm Graz	Mattersburg
18:30	Naumoski 48', 87'; Lovin 89'	Report	Sukuta-Pasu 23'	Stadium: Pappelstadion; Attendance: 5,399; Referee: Harald Lechner

11 August 2012 4	Sturm Graz	4–1	Wolfsberger AC	Graz
18:30	Szabics 7'; Okotie 9', 44'; Sukuta-Pasu 41'	Report	Jacobo 2'	Stadium: UPC-Arena; Attendance: 12,241; Referee: Robert Schorgenhofer

18 August 2012 5	Rapid Wien	3–0	Sturm Graz	Vienna
18:30	Burgstaller 15'; Alar 57'; Hofmann 70'	Report		Stadium: Gerhard Hanappi Stadium; Attendance: 14,783; Referee: Oliver Drachta

25 August 2012 6	Sturm Graz	3–2	Admira Wacker Mödling	Graz
18:30	Sukuta-Pasu 24', 73'; Vujadinović 42'	Report	Thürauer 54'; Bukva 60' (o.g.)	Stadium: UPC-Arena; Attendance: 8,468; Referee: Gerhard Grobelnik

1 September 2012 7	Ried	0–1	Sturm Graz	Ried im Innkreis
18:30		Report	Reifeltshammer 46' (o.g.)	Stadium: Keine Sorgen Arena; Attendance: 5,100; Referee: Christian Dintar

15 September 2012 8	Sturm Graz	3–0	Wacker Innsbruck	Graz
18:30	Vujadinović 35', 69' (yellow card) 82'; Madl (yellow card) 45+1'; Szabics 59'; Weber (yellow card) 65'	Summary	Hackmair (yellow card) 18'; Đaković (yellow card) 20'; Švejnoha (yellow card) 49'	Stadium: UPC-Arena; Attendance: 10,482; Referee: Manfred Krassnitzer

22 September 2012 9	Wiener Neustadt	1–1	Sturm Graz	Wiener Neustadt
18:30	Mimm (yellow card) 47'; Hinka 71' (yellow card) 90'; Lenko (yellow card) 82'; Wolf (yellow card) 84'	Summary	Weber 57'; Szabics (yellow card) 67'; Vujadinović (yellow card) 76'	Stadium: Stadion Wiener Neustadt; Attendance: 2,650; Referee: Dominik Ouschan

30 September 2012 10	Red Bull Salzburg	3–2	Sturm Graz	Salzburg
16:00	Hinteregger (yellow card) 33'; Berisha 43'; Mané 45', 89'; Kampl (yellow card) 64'	Summary	Hölzl (yellow card) 30'; Okotie 35' (yellow card) 75'; Sukuta-Pasu (yellow card) 42'; Kainz 65'; Klem (yellow card) 88'	Stadium: Red Bull Arena; Attendance: 10,953; Referee: Manuel Schüttengruber

7 October 2012 11	Sturm Graz	1–1	Austria Wien	Graz
16:00	Kainz 15' (pen.) (yellow card) 56'	Summary	Hosiner 7'; Suttner (yellow card) 14'; Mader (yellow card) 26'; Rogulj (yellow card) 28'; Rotpuller (yellow card) 87'	Stadium: UPC-Arena; Attendance: 13,364; Referee: Alain Bieri

20 October 2012 12	Sturm Graz	0–0	Mattersburg	Graz
18:30	Okotie (yellow card) 42'; Bukva (yellow card) 52'; Kaufmann (yellow card) 79'	Summary	Bürger (yellow card) 37'; Seidl (yellow card) 41'; Farkas (yellow card) 75'	Stadium: UPC-Arena; Attendance: 11,815; Referee: Robert Schörgenhofer

3 November 2012 13	Sturm Graz	2–1	Rapid Wien	Graz
18:30	Okotie (yellow card) 14'; Sukuta-Pasu 38'; Madl (yellow card) 42'; Kainz 47' (yellow card) 56'; Dudić (yellow card) 49'	Summary	Ildiz (yellow card) 25'; Burgstaller 67' (yellow card) 90'; Trimmel (yellow card) 77'; Sonnleitner (yellow card) 88'; Schrammel (yellow card) 90'	Stadium: UPC-Arena; Attendance: 13,259; Referee: Markus Hameter

10 November 2012 14	Admira	1–2	Sturm Graz	Maria Enzersdorf
16:00	Ouédraogo (yellow card) 57'; Sulimani 90+2'	Summary	Vujadinović 41' (yellow card) 82'; Kaufmann (yellow card) 44'; Okotie 47'; Madl (yellow card) 65'; Kainz (yellow card) 90'	Stadium: Bundesstadion Südstadt; Attendance: 3,510; Referee: Oliver Drachta

17 November 2012 15	Sturm Graz	3–1	SV Ried	Graz
18:30	Okotie 13', 77'; Weber (yellow card) 16'; Szabics 25'; Kainz (yellow card) 27'; Kainz (yellow card) 43'; Dudić (yellow card) 78'	Summary	Ziegl (yellow card) 18'; Gartler 36'; Riegler (yellow card) 86'	Stadium: UPC-Arena; Attendance: 11,899; Referee: Harald Lechner

24 November 2012 16	Wacker Innsbruck	0–3	Sturm Graz	Innsbruck
16:00	Saurer (yellow card) 9'; Wernitznig (yellow card) 38'; Švejnoha (yellow card) 90+2'	Summary	Madl (yellow card) 48'; Vujadinović (yellow card) 54'; Sukuta-Pasu 60', 70', 85'	Stadium: Tivoli-Neu; Attendance: 6,370; Referee: Manuel Schüttengruber

27 November 2012 17	Wolfsberger AC	1–1	Sturm Graz	Wolfsberg, Carinthia
19:30	Solano (yellow card) 41' (goal) 68'; Topčagić (yellow card) 79'	Summary	Szabics 57'; Madl (yellow card) 64'; Dudić (yellow card) 87'	Stadium: Lavanttal-Arena; Attendance: 11,300; Referee: Thomas Prammer

1 December 2012 18	Sturm Graz	3–1	SC Wiener Neustadt	Graz
18:30	Bukva (yellow card) 12'; Sukuta-Pasu 16', 62' (yellow card) 53'; Dudić 43'	Summary	Ramsebner (yellow card) 47'; Tadić 50'; Dominik Hofbauer (yellow card) 67'; Friesenbichler (yellow card) 90+1'	Stadium: UPC-Arena; Attendance: 12,268; Referee: Dieter Muckenhammer

8 December 2012 19	Sturm Graz	1–1	Red Bull Salzburg	Graz
18:30	Sukuta-Pasu 8'; Ehrenreich (yellow card) 78'	Summary	Vorsah (yellow card) 22'; Valentino Lazaro (yellow card) 43'; Mané 66'	Stadium: UPC-Arena; Attendance: 10,041; Referee: Manfred Krassnitzer

16 December 2012 20	FK Austria Wien	–	Sturm Graz	Vienna
16:00				Stadium: Franz Horr Stadium

==== League table ====
===== Overall league table =====
Pos	Team	Pld	W	D	L	GF	GA	GD	Pts	Qualification or relegation
2	Red Bull Salzburg	36	22	11	3	91	39	+52	77	Qualification for the Champions League third qualifying round
3	Rapid Wien	36	16	9	11	57	39	+18	57	Qualification for the Europa League third qualifying round
4	Sturm Graz	36	13	9	14	49	56	−7	48	Qualification for the Europa League second qualifying round
5	Wolfsberger AC	36	12	11	13	53	56	−3	47	
6	SV Ried	36	13	7	16	60	59	+1	46	

Source: weltfussball.de (in German)
Rules for classification: 1) points; 2) goal difference; 3) number of goals scored.

===== Summary table =====
Overall								Home						Away					
Pld	W	D	L	GF	GA	GD	Pts	W	D	L	GF	GA	GD	W	D	L	GF	GA	GD
19	10	5	4	32	22	+10	35	6	3	1	20	10	+10	4	2	3	12	12	0

Last updated: 12 December 2012.
Source: Bundesliga.at (Home) and Bundesliga.at (Away)

=== ÖFB-Cup ===
13 July 2012 1st Round	WSG Swarovski Wattens	0–1	SK Sturm Graz	Wattens
19:00 CET		Report	60' Säumel	Stadium: Alpenstadion; Attendance: 1.000; Referee: Robert Schörgenhofer

25 September 2012 2nd Round	SV Shwechat	0–5	SK Sturm Graz	Schwechat
19:00 CET		Report	50', 64', 68' Okotie; 78' Szabics; 80' Weber	Stadium: Rudolf-Tonn-Stadion

30 October 2012 3rd Round	SK Sturm Graz	1–2	Wacker Innsbruck	Graz
18:00 CET	Klem 26'; Madl (yellow card) 48'	Summary	Saurer (yellow card) 25'; Perstaller 59'; Roman Waller 83'	Stadium: UPC-Arena; Attendance: 3,217
