= Montjuïc amusement park =

Defunct Amusement park in Barcelona

The Montjuïc amusement park, now defunct, was located in the space where the Joan Brossa Gardens currently stand in the Barcelona neighborhood of Montjuïc. It was inaugurated on June 18, 1966 and remained in operation for 32 years, until September 27, 1998.

== History ==
The space it occupied corresponded partly to the land of a former military coastal artillery detachment called Álvarez de Castro installed in 1897, in the remains of a previous Maricel amusement park (in operation between 1930–1936), and several slum neighborhoods, including Maricel and Tres Pins. Everything was demolished to allow for the construction of the new amusement park.

The Venezuelan businessman José Antonio Borges Villegasa promoted the construction, of a semi-private nature, which after an agreement with the Barcelona City Council had a concession for thirty years. Borges had already directed, among others, the Coney Island park in Caracas.

Partially inaugurated on June 23, 1966, it was well received by the city and the tourists who visited it, and came to have more than 40 attractions of all kinds, in addition to a theater-auditorium where different performances by renowned artists or various festivals were held. The success can be directly linked to the shows that were held in the theater and, especially, to the type of mechanical attractions that at the time were a true revolution compared to those known until then, such as the Coctelera, the Gran Muntanya Russa, the Loco Ratón or the Zig-Zag. Construction ended the end of the 1960s.

Around 1973, the Spaniard Carlos Merino took charge of the park, and took the opportunity to refurbish its infrastructure and facilities, and to set up new attractions that expanded the park's offer. A deep remodeling that included the entrance of some of the most legendary attractions such as the Pulpo, Amor Express, El Barco Mississippi or Noriavisión, the latter the tallest Ferris wheel in the Catalan Countries that had been installed up to that point.

The park continued to enjoy a benchmark success, but towards the 1990s the fashion for new theme parks began to corner it, and only the installation of a spectacular roller coaster called Boomerang managed to maintain the level for a while, until the novelty wore off. Despite everything, the lack of investment caused by the proximity of the end of the concession, caused the number of visitors to drop. In this situation, subsequent disagreements between the company and the city council led to its definitive closure, on September 27, 1998.

When it closed, it was immediately dismantled, and the attractions that could be used were removed and sold off. The Boomerang ended up in an amusement park in New Orleans until it was destroyed by Hurricane Katrina in 2005, and the Ciclon ended up at an amusement park in Platja d'Aro. After a few years of abandonment, the land was developed to create the Joan Brossa Gardens, inaugurated in 2003.
