= Schrott =

Schrott is a surname. Notable people with the surname include:

- Andreas Schrott (born 1981), Austrian footballer and manager
- Beate Schrott (born 1988), Austrian hurdler
- Erwin Schrott (born 1972), Uruguayan opera singer
- Karl Schrott (born 1953), Austrian luger
- Raoul Schrott, Austrian poet
