= Alexander Pöllhuber =

Austrian footballer (born 1985)

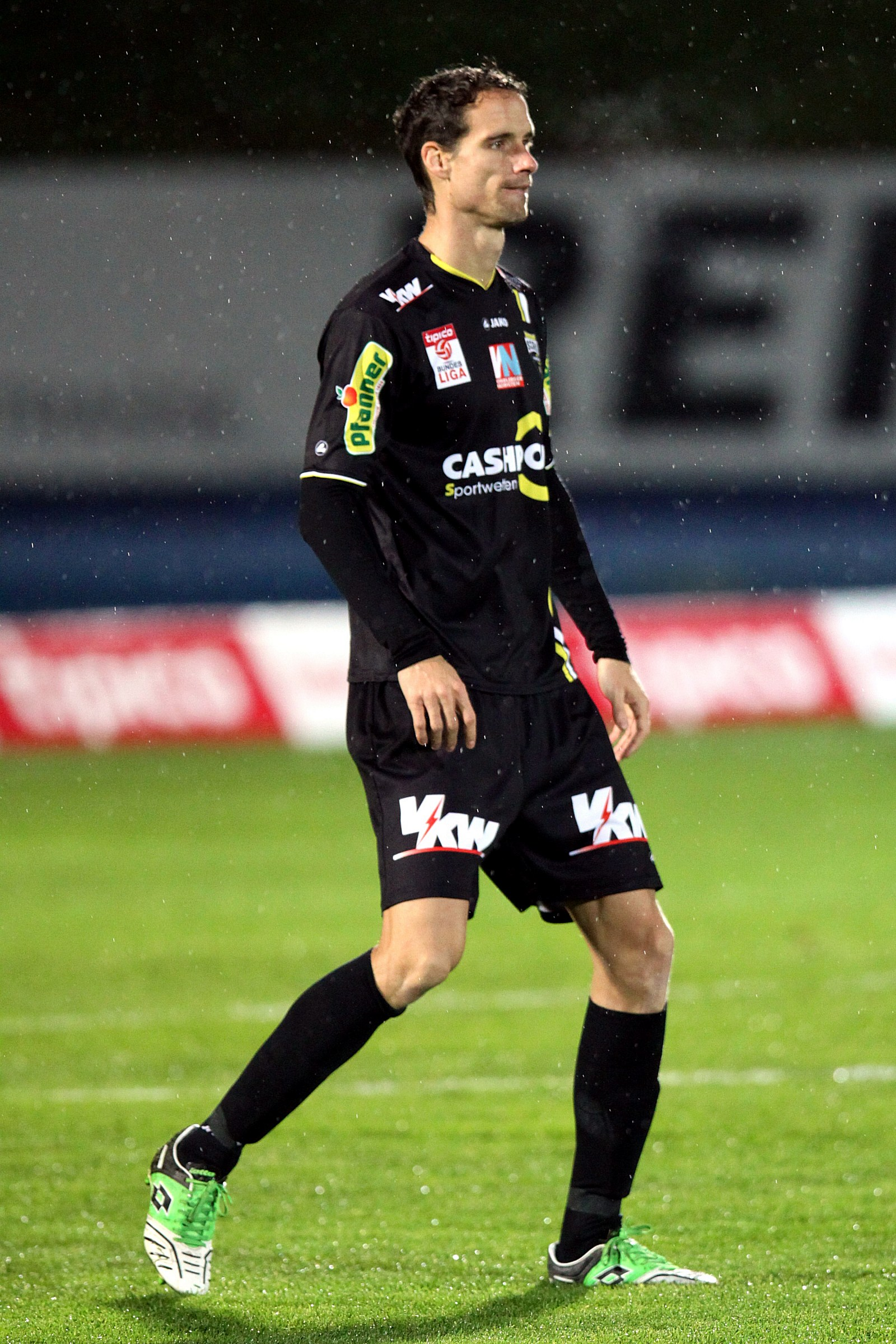

Personal information
- Full name: Alexander Pöllhuber
- Date of birth: 30 April 1985 (age 41)
- Place of birth: Zell am Moos, Austria
- Height: 2.00 m (6 ft 7 in)
- Position: Centre-back

Team information
- Current team: UFC Leopoldskron-Moos
- Number: 16

Senior career*
| Years | Team | Apps | (Gls) |
| 2004–2006 | Red Bull Salzburg | 15 | (1) |
| 2006 | Sturm Graz | 3 | (0) |
| 2006–2007 | Admira Wacker | 13 | (1) |
| 2007–2013 | Mattersburg | 124 | (6) |
| 2013–2016 | Rheindorf Altach | 60 | (3) |
| 2016–2019 | SK Bischofshofen | 65 | (5) |
| 2019–2020 | UFC Siezenheim | 13 | (0) |
| 2020–2021 | ASV Salzburg | 0 | (0) |
| 2024– | UFC Leopoldskron-Moos | 0 | (0) |

International career
| 2004–2006 | Austria U21 | 14 | (0) |
- * Club domestic league appearances and goals

Alexander Pöllhuber (born 30 April 1985) is an Austrian professional footballer who plays as a centre-back for Austrian 2. Klasse Nord club UFC Leopoldskron-Moos. He is the twin brother of SC Austria Lustenau defender Peter Pöllhuber.
