= Marcel Sabitzer =

Austrian footballer (born 1994)

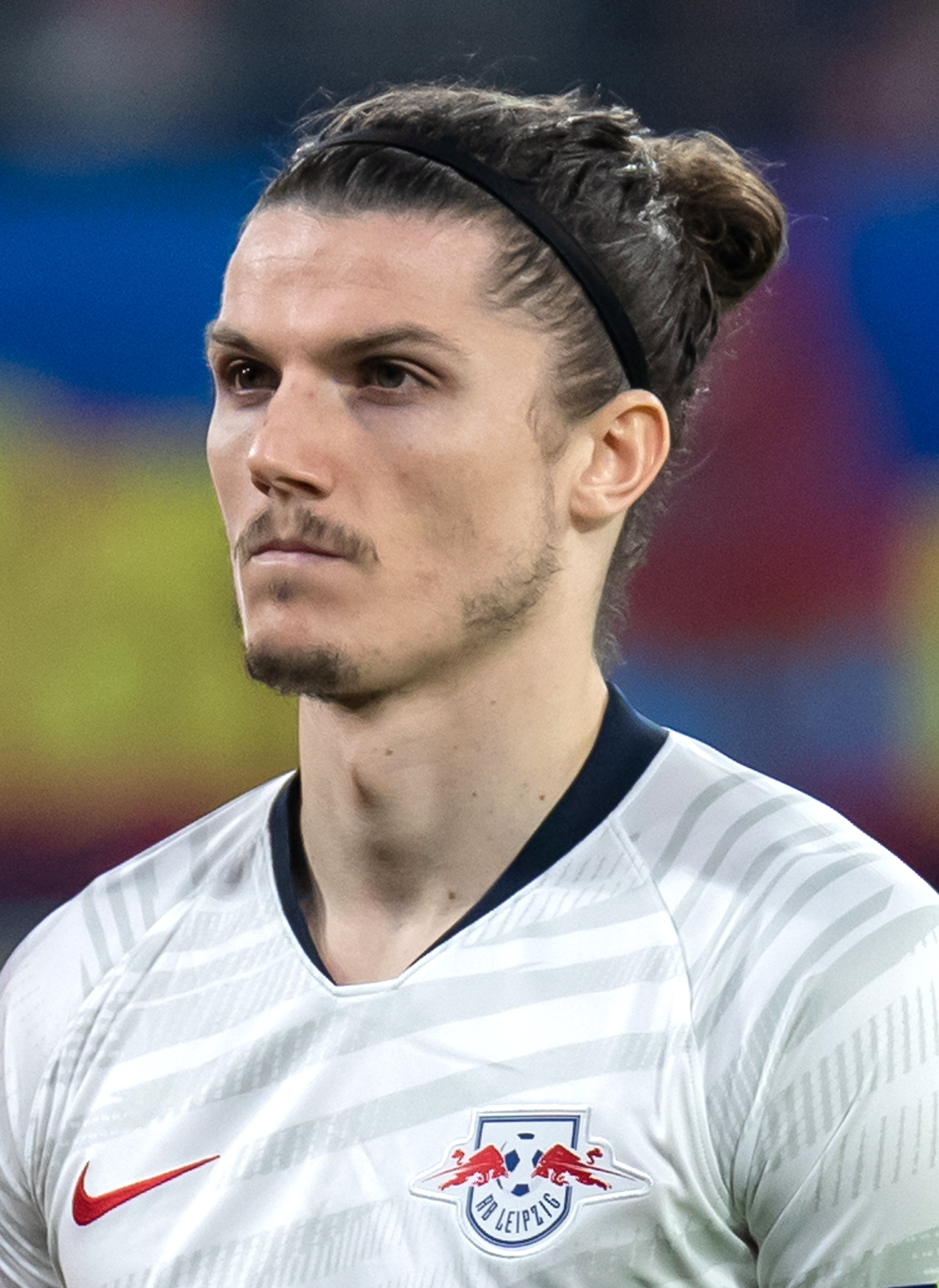
- Sabitzer with RB Leipzig in 2020

Personal information
- Full name: Marcel Sabitzer
- Date of birth: 17 March 1994 (age 32)
- Place of birth: Wels, Austria
- Height: 1.78 m (5 ft 10 in)
- Positions: Midfielder; forward

Team information
- Current team: Borussia Dortmund
- Number: 20

Youth career
- 2000–2001: Admira Villach
- 2001–2008: Grazer AK
- 2008–2009: 1. Wiener Neustädter SC
- 2009: Austria Wien
- 2009–2010: Admira Wacker

Senior career*
Years	Team	Apps	(Gls)
2010–2011	Admira Wacker II	34	(15)
2010–2013	Admira Wacker	45	(11)
2013–2014	Rapid Wien	45	(10)
2014–2021	RB Leipzig	177	(40)
2014–2015	→ Red Bull Salzburg (loan)	33	(19)
2021–2023	Bayern Munich	40	(2)
2023	→ Manchester United (loan)	11	(0)
2023–	Borussia Dortmund	83	(6)

International career^{‡}
2009–2010	Austria U16	7	(1)
2010–2011	Austria U17	9	(3)
2011	Austria U18	2	(0)
2012–2013	Austria U19	4	(5)
2012–2013	Austria U21	7	(1)
2012–	Austria	102	(27)
- * Club domestic league appearances and goals as of 20:30, 31 October 2026 (UTC) ‡ National team caps and goals as of 18:25, 3 July 2026 (UTC)

Marcel Sabitzer (born 17 March 1994) is an Austrian professional footballer who plays for Bundesliga club Borussia Dortmund and the Austria national team. Predominantly a central midfielder, he can play in a multitude of roles, including attacking midfielder, defensive midfielder, winger and second striker.

Sabitzer began his professional career in Austria with Admira Wacker and Rapid Wien. He joined German club RB Leipzig in 2014 and was immediately loaned to Red Bull Salzburg for a season. Sabitzer made more than 200 appearances for RB Leipzig, before Bayern Munich signed him in August 2021 for a reported transfer fee of €16 million, winning the Bundesliga and DFL-Supercup in his first season with the club.

Sabitzer represented Austria at multiple youth international levels and made his senior international debut at the age of 18 in June 2012. He has earned over 100 caps for Austria, and played at the UEFA European Championship in 2016, 2020 and 2024, and the FIFA World Cup in 2026.

== Club career ==
=== Early career ===
Sabitzer joined Admira Wacker's youth academy in July 2009, having previously played youth football for Admira Villach, Grazer AK, 1. Wiener Neustädter SC and Austria Wien.

In January 2013, Sabitzer joined Rapid Wien on a contract until the summer of 2016 for an undisclosed transfer fee.

=== RB Leipzig ===
==== 2014–2016 ====
On 30 May 2014, Sabitzer signed a four-year contract with RB Leipzig, and was loaned for Red Bull Salzburg for the 2014–15 season.

Sabitzer returned to RB Leipzig for the 2015–16 season, when he scored eight goals in 34 appearances. On 1 April 2016, Sabitzer extended his contract until 2021.

==== 2016–2021 ====
He finished the 2016–17 season with nine goals in 33 appearances. In the 2017–18 season, he scored five goals in 34 appearances.

In the 2019–20 UEFA Champions League, Sabitzer scored his first two goals in the competition in back-to-back matches against Zenit Saint Petersburg. On 10 March 2020, he scored twice in a 3–0 win over Tottenham Hotspur in the Champions League round of 16, to help earn Leipzig a 4–0 aggregate victory and a place in the quarter-finals of the competition for the first time in club's history. Leipzig eventually lost 0–3 to Paris Saint-Germain in a semi finals match on 18 August, and were knocked out of the tournament. Sabitzer finished the 2019–20 campaign with 16 goals and 11 assists in all competitions.

=== Bayern Munich ===
On 30 August 2021, Sabitzer signed a four-year contract with Bayern Munich for a reported transfer fee of €16 million. On 2 April 2022, he scored his first goal in a 4–1 away win over Freiburg.

==== Loan to Manchester United ====
On 1 February 2023, Sabitzer signed for English side Manchester United on loan until the end of the season. He made his debut three days later, coming on as a substitute in the 2022–23 Premier League win against Crystal Palace, making him the first Austrian to ever play for the club. On 26 February, Sabitzer played in the 2023 EFL Cup final, coming on as a substitute in a 2–0 victory over Newcastle United.

He scored his first goal for the club at the 2022–23 FA Cup quarter-finals against Fulham which ended 3–1 for United. On 13 April, Sabitzer scored a brace in 2–2 draw against Sevilla in the first leg of 2022–23 UEFA Europa League quarter-finals. On 15 May, Manchester United announced that Sabitzer was ruled out for the rest of the season after suffering a meniscal injury. On 30 June, Manchester United announced the departure of Sabitzer after the expiration of his loan deal, and he effectively returned to Bayern.

=== Borussia Dortmund ===
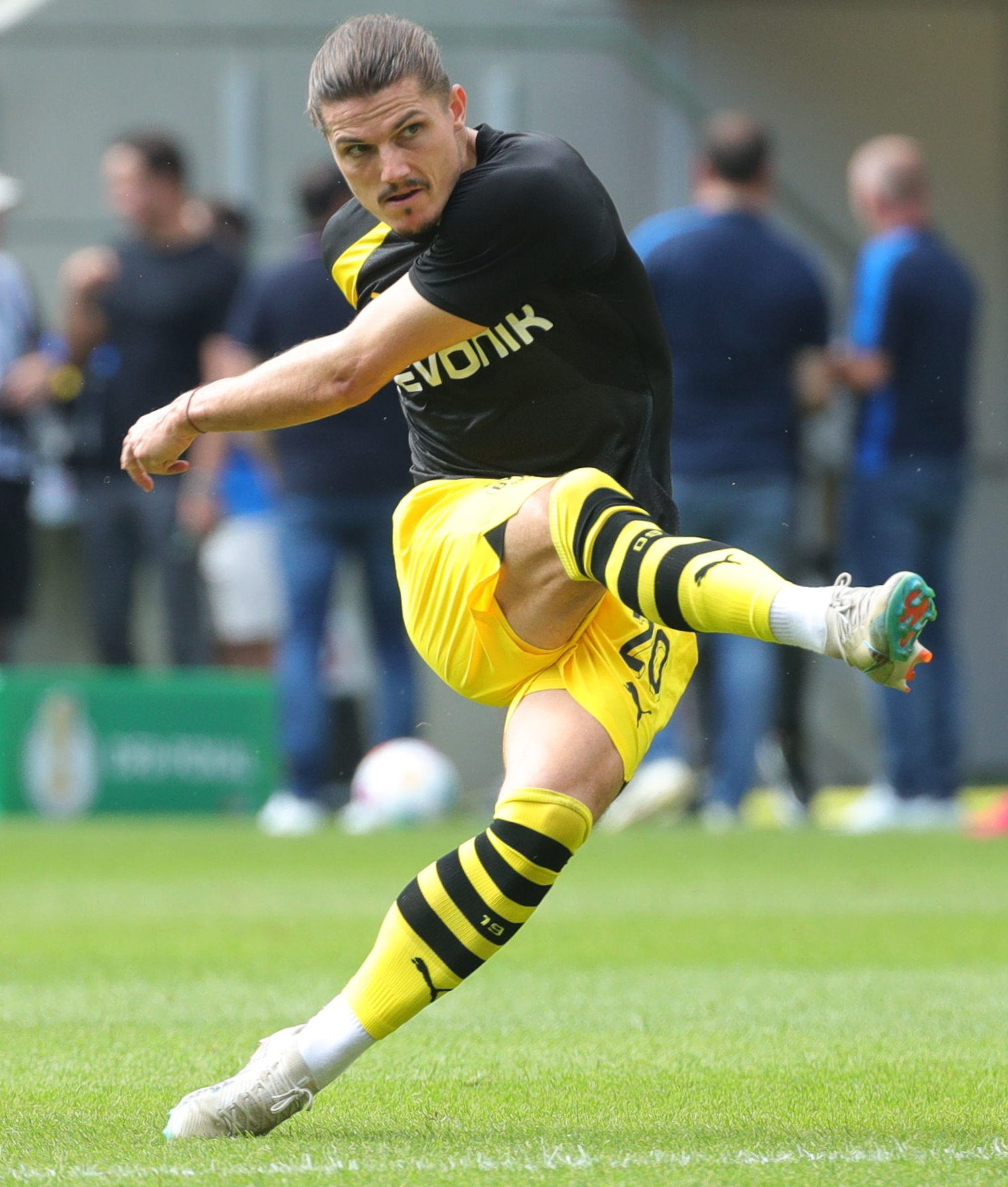
Sabitzer training with Borussia Dortmund in 2023

On 24 July 2023, Sabitzer signed for Bayern's rival club Borussia Dortmund on a four-year deal. On 12 August, he scored his first goal, in a 6–1 away win over Schott Mainz in the DFB-Pokal. On 16 April 2024, Sabitzer provided two assists and scored a goal in a 4–2 victory against Atlético Madrid in the Champions League quarterfinal second leg, which qualified his club to the semifinals by winning 5–4 on aggregate for the first time since 2012–13. He reached the final and was eventually named in the Team of the Season in that competition.

== International career ==
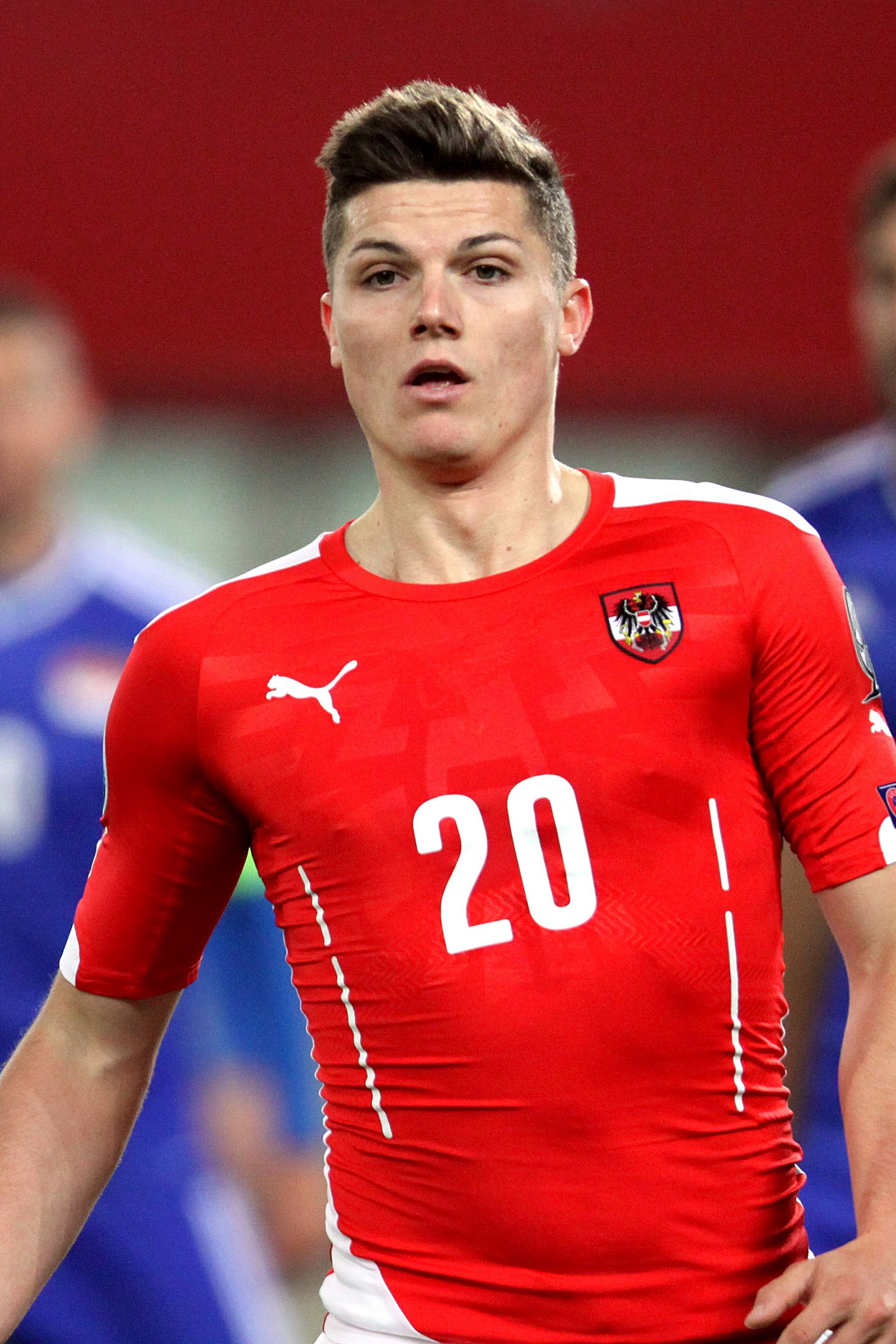
Sabitzer playing for Austria in 2015

Sabitzer played youth international football for Austria at under-16, under-17, under-18, under-19 and under-21 levels. He made his senior international debut for Austria at the age of 18 on 5 June 2012, in a goalless friendly against Romania. He also represented the national team at UEFA Euro 2016 and UEFA Euro 2020.

In June 2024, he was included in the squad for UEFA Euro 2024. On 25 June, Sabitzer was awarded player of the match, scoring the decisive goal in a 3–2 victory over the Netherlands in the final group stage match of Euro 2024, ensuring his country finished at the top of their group.

On 18 May 2026, Sabitzer was selected in Ralf Rangnick's 26-man squad for the 2026 FIFA World Cup, marking Austria's first appearance in the tournament since 1998. He made his 100th international appearance for Austria in a 2–0 defeat to Argentina in their second match of the World Cup.

== Personal life ==
He is a son of former Austria international Herfried Sabitzer, and the cousin of footballer Thomas Sabitzer.

== Career statistics ==
=== Club ===
As of match played 31 October 2026

Appearances and goals by club, season and competition
Club	Season	League			National cup (Note: Includes Austrian Cup, DFB-Pokal, FA Cup)		League cup (Note: Includes EFL Cup)		Europe		Other		Total	
Club	Season	Division	Apps	Goals	Apps	Goals	Apps	Goals	Apps	Goals	Apps	Goals	Apps	Goals
Admira Wacker	2010–11	Austrian First League	8	2	0	0	—		—		—		8	2
Admira Wacker	2011–12	Austrian Bundesliga	20	5	1	0	—		—		—		21	5
Admira Wacker	2012–13	Austrian Bundesliga	17	4	2	0	—		4 (Note: Appearances in UEFA Europa League)	0	—		23	4
Admira Wacker	Total		45	11	3	0	—		4	0	—		52	11
Rapid Wien	2012–13	Austrian Bundesliga	16	3	1	0	—		—		—		17	3
Rapid Wien	2013–14	Austrian Bundesliga	29	7	1	0	—		10	2	—		40	9
Rapid Wien	Total		45	10	2	0	—		10	2	—		57	12
RB Leipzig	2015–16	2. Bundesliga	32	8	2	0	—		—		—		34	8
RB Leipzig	2016–17	Bundesliga	32	8	1	1	—		—		—		33	9
RB Leipzig	2017–18	Bundesliga	22	3	2	2	—		10 (Note: Five appearances in UEFA Champions League, five appearances in UEFA Europa League)	0	—		34	5
RB Leipzig	2018–19	Bundesliga	30	4	5	0	—		8	1	—		43	5
RB Leipzig	2019–20	Bundesliga	32	9	3	3	—		9 (Note: Appearances in UEFA Champions League)	4	—		44	16
RB Leipzig	2020–21	Bundesliga	27	8	5	1	—		7	0	—		39	9
RB Leipzig	2021–22	Bundesliga	2	0	0	0	—		—		—		2	0
RB Leipzig	Total		177	40	18	7	—		34	5	—		229	52
Red Bull Salzburg (loan)	2014–15	Austrian Bundesliga	33	19	6	7	—		12 (Note: Four appearances in UEFA Champions League, eight appearances and one goal in UEFA Europa League)	1	—		51	27
Bayern Munich	2021–22	Bundesliga	25	1	0	0	—		5	0	—		30	1
Bayern Munich	2022–23	Bundesliga	15	1	2	0	—		6	0	1 (Note: Appearance in DFL-/Franz Beckenbauer Supercup)	0	24	1
Bayern Munich	Total		40	2	2	0	—		11	0	1	0	54	2
Manchester United (loan)	2022–23	Premier League	11	0	3	1	1	0	3	2	—		18	3
Borussia Dortmund	2023–24	Bundesliga	25	4	3	1	—		12	1	—		40	6
Borussia Dortmund	2024–25	Bundesliga	26	1	2	0	—		11	0	4 (Note: Appearances in FIFA Club World Cup)	0	43	1
Borussia Dortmund	2025–26	Bundesliga	16	1	2	0	—		6	0	—		24	1
Borussia Dortmund	2026–27	Bundesliga	6	0	2	1	—		2	0	1	0	11	1
Borussia Dortmund	Total		83	6	9	2	—		31	1	5	0	128	9
Career total			434	88	43	17	1	0	106	11	6	0	589	116

=== International ===
As of match played 2 July 2026

Appearances and goals by national team and year
National team	Year	Apps	Goals
Austria	2012	1	0
Austria	2013	2	0
Austria	2014	6	2
Austria	2015	7	1
Austria	2016	9	1
Austria	2017	4	1
Austria	2018	4	0
Austria	2019	9	2
Austria	2020	4	1
Austria	2021	12	2
Austria	2022	10	2
Austria	2023	9	5
Austria	2024	10	3
Austria	2025	8	3
Austria	2026	7	4
Total		102	27

As of match played 27 June 2026

Scores and results list Austria's goal tally first, score column indicates score after each Sabitzer goal

List of international goals scored by Marcel Sabitzer
No.	Date	Venue	Opponent	Score	Result	Competition
1.	30 May 2014	Tivoli-Neu, Innsbruck, Austria	Iceland	1–0	1–1	Friendly
2.	3 June 2014	Andrův stadion, Olomouc, Czech Republic	Czech Republic	1–0	2–1	Friendly
3.	9 October 2015	Podgorica City Stadium, Podgorica, Montenegro	Montenegro	3–2	3–2	UEFA Euro 2016 qualifying
4.	9 October 2016	Red Star Stadium, Belgrade, Serbia	Serbia	1–1	2–3	2018 FIFA World Cup qualification
5.	14 November 2017	Ernst-Happel-Stadion, Vienna, Austria	Uruguay	1–0	2–1	Friendly
6.	6 September 2019	Stadion Wals-Siezenheim, Wals-Siezenheim, Austria	Latvia	2–0	6–0	UEFA Euro 2020 qualifying
7.	10 October 2019	Ernst-Happel-Stadion, Vienna, Austria	Israel	3–1	3–1	UEFA Euro 2020 qualifying
8.	4 September 2020	Ullevaal Stadion, Oslo, Norway	Norway	2–0	2–1	2020–21 UEFA Nations League B
9.	9 October 2021	Tórsvøllur, Tórshavn, Faroe Islands	Faroe Islands	2–0	2–0	2022 FIFA World Cup qualification
10.	12 November 2021	Wörthersee Stadion, Klagenfurt, Austria	Israel	4–2	4–2	2022 FIFA World Cup qualification
11.	24 March 2022	Cardiff City Stadium, Cardiff, Wales	Wales	1–2	1–2	2022 FIFA World Cup qualification
12.	3 June 2022	Gradski Vrt Stadium, Osijek, Croatia	Croatia	3–0	3–0	2022–23 UEFA Nations League A
13.	24 March 2023	Raiffeisen Arena, Linz, Austria	Azerbaijan	1–0	4–1	UEFA Euro 2024 qualifying
14.	24 March 2023	Raiffeisen Arena, Linz, Austria	Azerbaijan	3–0	4–1	UEFA Euro 2024 qualifying
15.	13 October 2023	Ernst-Happel-Stadion, Vienna, Austria	Belgium	2–3	2–3	UEFA Euro 2024 qualifying
16.	16 October 2023	Tofiq Bahramov Republican Stadium, Baku, Azerbaijan	Azerbaijan	1–0	1–0	UEFA Euro 2024 qualifying
17.	21 November 2023	Ernst-Happel-Stadion, Vienna, Austria	Germany	1–0	2–0	Friendly
18.	25 June 2024	Olympiastadion, Berlin, Germany	Netherlands	3–2	3–2	UEFA Euro 2024
19.	9 September 2024	Ullevaal Stadion, Oslo, Norway	Norway	1–1	1–2	2024–25 UEFA Nations League B
20.	10 October 2024	Raiffeisen Arena, Linz, Austria	Kazakhstan	3–0	4–0	2024–25 UEFA Nations League B
21.	7 June 2025	Ernst-Happel-Stadion, Vienna, Austria	Romania	2–0	2–1	2026 FIFA World Cup qualification
22.	6 September 2025	Raiffeisen Arena, Linz, Austria	Cyprus	1–0	1–0	2026 FIFA World Cup qualification
23.	9 September 2025	Bilino Polje Stadium, Zenica, Bosnia and Herzegovina	Bosnia and Herzegovina	1–0	2–1	2026 FIFA World Cup qualification
24.	27 March 2026	Ernst-Happel-Stadion, Vienna, Austria	Ghana	1–0	5–1	Friendly
25.	31 March 2026	Ernst-Happel-Stadion, Vienna, Austria	South Korea	1–0	1–0	Friendly
26.	1 June 2026	Ernst-Happel-Stadion, Vienna, Austria	Tunisia	1–0	1–0	Friendly
27.	27 June 2026	Arrowhead Stadium, Kansas City, United States	Algeria	2–1	3–3	2026 FIFA World Cup

== Honours ==
Admira Wacker

- Austrian First League: 2010-11

Red Bull Salzburg

- Austrian Bundesliga: 2014–15
- Austrian Cup: 2014–15

Bayern Munich

- Bundesliga: 2021–22
- DFL-Supercup: 2022

Manchester United

- EFL Cup: 2022–23

Individual

- Austrian Bundesliga top assist provider: 2014–15
- Austrian Footballer of the Year: 2017
- UEFA Champions League Squad of the Season: 2019–20
- Bundesliga Goal of the Month: February 2021
- Bundesliga Team of the Season: 2019–20
- kicker Bundesliga Team of the Season: 2019–20
- Austrian Cup top scorer: 7 Goals 2014–15
- UEFA Champions League Team of the Season: 2023–24
- UEFA Champions League top assist provider: 2023–24

== See also ==
- List of men's footballers with 100 or more international caps
