= Peter Pöllhuber =

Austrian footballer

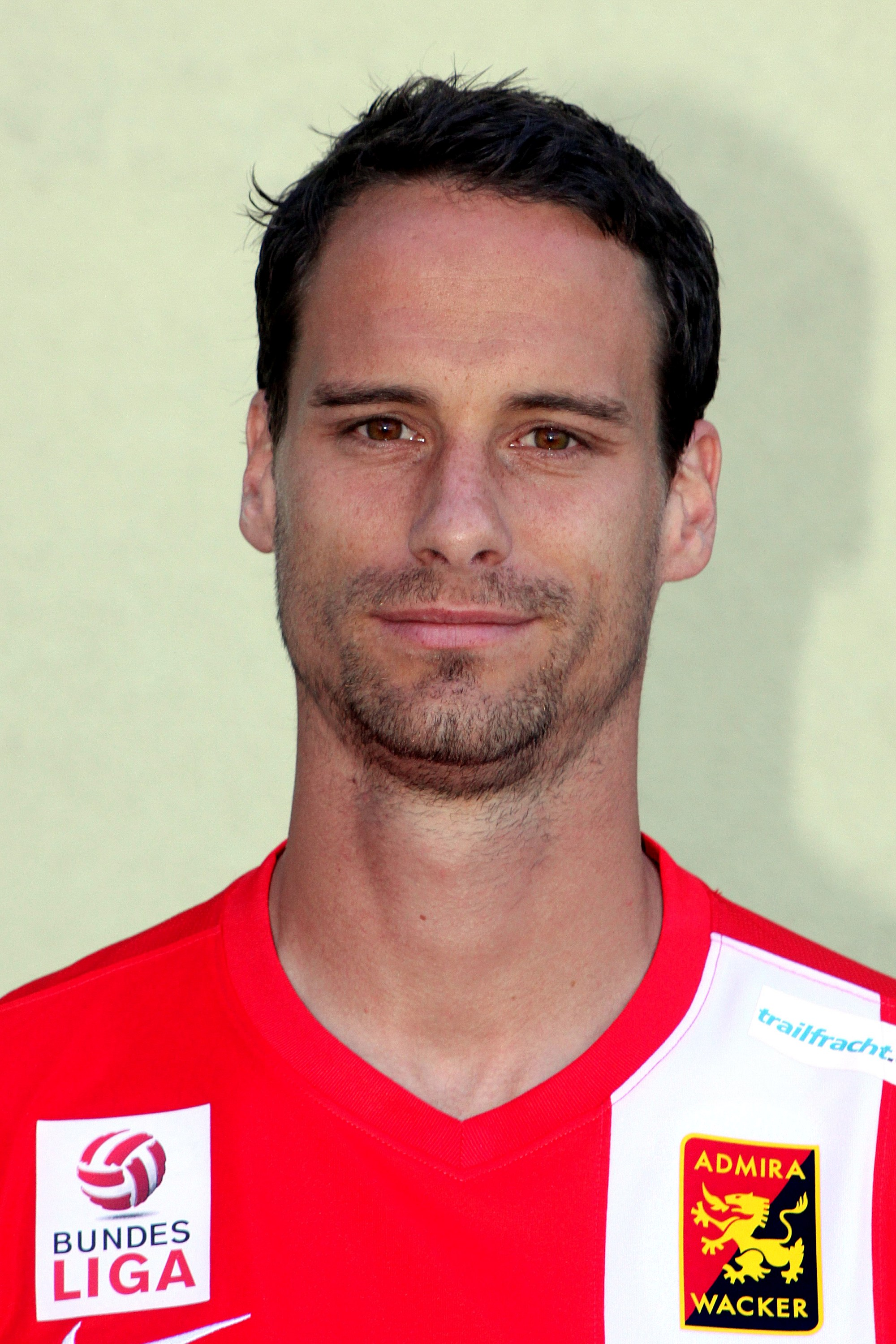

Personal information
- Date of birth: 30 April 1985 (age 41)
- Place of birth: Zell am Moos, Austria
- Height: 1.95 m (6 ft 5 in)
- Position: Defender

Team information
- Current team: Wiener Viktoria
- Number: 6

Senior career*
Years	Team	Apps	(Gls)
2006–2012	Austria Lustenau	103	(3)
2012–2014	Admira Wacker	14	(0)
2014–	Wiener Viktoria	0	(0)
- * Club domestic league appearances and goals as of 10:21, 12 February 2014 (UTC)

Peter Pöllhuber (born 30 April 1985) is an Austrian professional association football player, currently playing for Wiener Viktoria as a defender. He is the twin brother of SC Rheindorf Altach defender Alexander Pöllhuber.
