= Christian Klem =

Austrian professional footballer (born 1991)

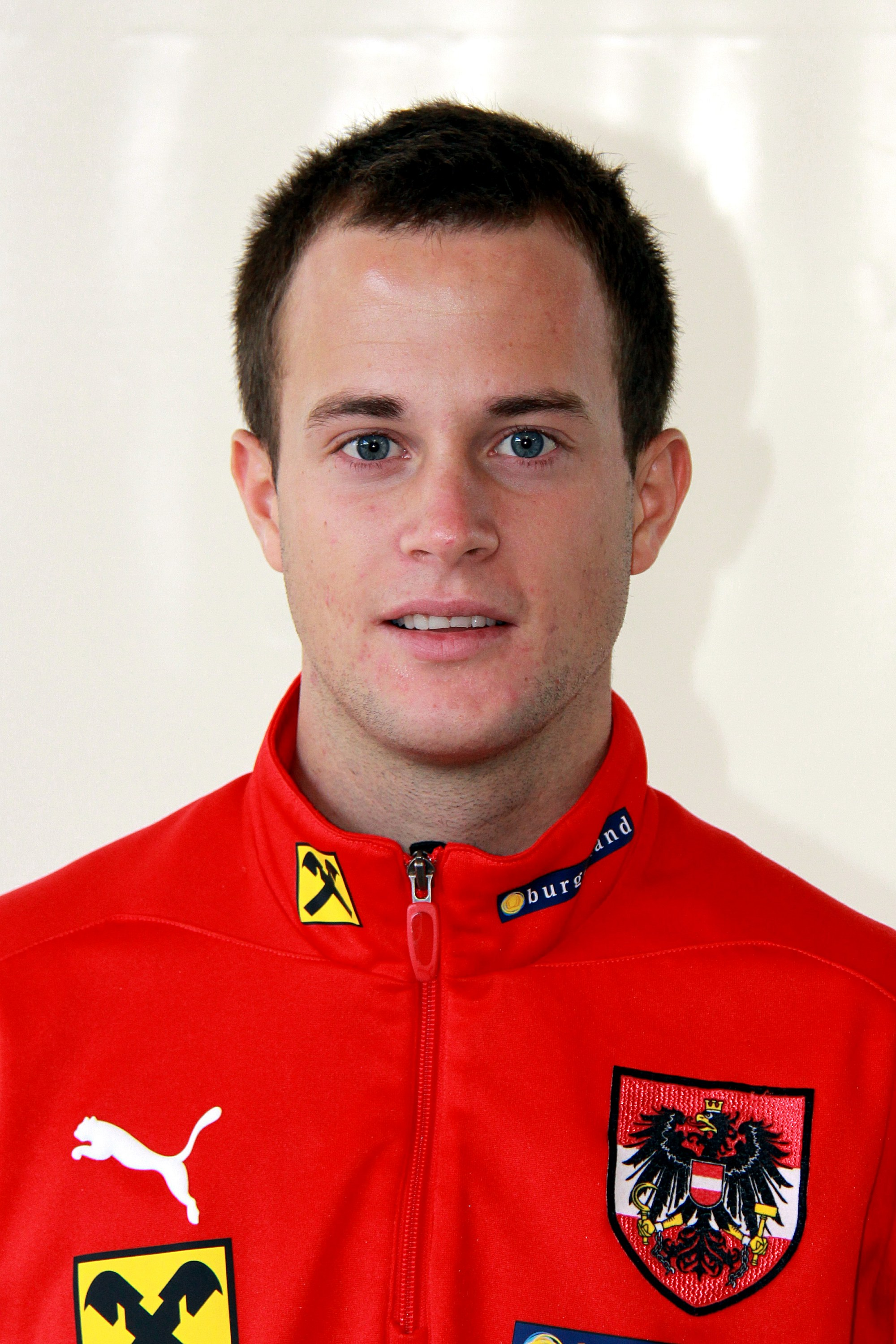
- Klem in 2010

Personal information
- Date of birth: 21 April 1991 (age 35)
- Place of birth: Graz, Austria
- Height: 1.72 m (5 ft 8 in)
- Position: Midfielder

Youth career
- Sturm Graz

Senior career*
| Years | Team | Apps | (Gls) |
| 2007–2011 | Sturm Graz (A) | 49 | (2) |
| 2009–2016 | Sturm Graz | 166 | (1) |
| 2016–2018 | Wolfsberger AC | 32 | (3) |
| 2018–2019 | SV Lafnitz | 9 | (1) |
| 2019 | Wacker Innsbruck | 14 | (0) |
| 2019–2023 | TSV Hartberg | 90 | (1) |
| Total | | 360 | (8) |

International career
- Austria U16
| 2007–2008 | Austria U17 | 10 | (2) |
| 2008 | Austria U18 | 1 | (0) |
| 2009–2010 | Austria U19 | 14 | (5) |
| 2009–2012 | Austria U21 | 12 | (0) |
| 2011 | Austria U20 | 3 | (0) |
- * Club domestic league appearances and goals

Christian Klem (born 21 April 1991) is an Austrian former professional footballer who played as a midfielder.

== Career ==
=== Early career and Sturm Graz ===
Born in Graz, Klem started his career at Sturm Graz, having previously played for their youth academy. He made his debut for Sturm Graz in 2009, making 7 appearances in the Austrian Bundesliga over the course of the 2009–10 season, whilst he made 10 Bundesliga appearances in the 2010–11 season, in which Sturm Graz became Bundesliga champions for the third time in their history.

He was a regular player for Sturm Graz over the following few seasons, making 25 Bundesliga appearances during the 2011–12 season before making 34, 32 and 34 appearances in the Bundesliga across the 2012–13, 2013–14 and 2014–15 seasons respectively, whilst also playing in the UEFA Europa League during the 2011–12 season.

In August 2015, he suffered a muscle tear in his left thigh, meaning he was injured for much of the 2015–16 season. Following his return from injury, he made 17 appearances for Sturm Graz before leaving the club in the summer.

=== Wolfsberger AC ===
He joined Wolfsberger AC in the summer of 2016 on a two-year contract. He made 32 appearances during the 2016–17 season for Wolfsberger AC, scoring 3 goals, but failed to make a single appearance for the club during the 2017–18 season, and left the club at the end of the season.

=== SV Lafnitz and Wacker Innsbruck ===
In the summer of 2018, he joined Austrian 2. Liga club SV Lafnitz. He made 9 appearances in the 2. Liga for Lafnitz before joining Bundesliga club Wacker Innsbruck in January 2019. He made 14 Bundesliga appearances for the club as they were relegated to the 2. Liga.

=== TSV Hartberg ===
In the summer of 2019, he joined newly promoted Austrian Bundesliga club TSV Hartberg on a two-year contract.

In June 2021, his Hartberg contract was extended to summer 2023.

He was released at the end of his contract in summer 2023, and subsequently retired.

== International career ==
Klem has represented his native Austria between Under-16 and Under-21 levels.
