= Jürgen Säumel =

Austrian footballer

- Säumel in 2025

Personal information
- Date of birth: 8 September 1984 (age 42)
- Place of birth: Friesach, Austria
- Height: 1.80 m (5 ft 11 in)
- Position: Midfielder

Youth career
- TSV Neumarkt

Senior career*
Years	Team	Apps	(Gls)
2002–2008	Sturm Graz	140	(9)
2008–2010	Torino	30	(2)
2010	→ Brescia (loan)	10	(0)
2011	MSV Duisburg	7	(0)
2011–2013	Sturm Graz	27	(2)
2013–2014	Wiener Neustadt	20	(0)
2014–2017	Wacker Innsbruck	79	(5)
Total		313	(18)

International career
2005–2012	Austria	20	(0)

Managerial career
- 2024–2025: Sturm Graz
- * Club domestic league appearances and goals

Jürgen Säumel (born 8 September 1984) is an Austrian professional football coach and former midfielder.

He began his playing career in the youth system of TSV Neumarkt before progressing through the ranks at SK Sturm Graz, where he became a key first team player and, at the age 20, the club's youngest captain. Säumel made more than 300 senior club appearances across Austria, Italy and Germany, and earned 20 caps for the Austrian national team, representing his country at UEFA Euro 2008.

After retiring from playing in 2018, he transitioned into coaching and has lately served as head coach of SK Sturm Graz, leading the club to the Austrian Bundesliga title in 2025.

== Playing career ==
Säumel began his football career in the youth system of the Styrian amateur club TSV Neumarkt before joining the youth academy at SK Sturm Graz in 1999. Progressing rapidly, he was promoted to the amateur team and made his way into the senior squad for the 2002/03 season. In 2003, Säumel was part of the Austrian U-19 team that won a bronze medal at the UEFA European Under-19 Championship in Liechtenstein and got 51 caps with the Austrian's youth sides, scoring five goals.

In 2004, at just 20 years old, Säumel became SK Sturm Graz´s youngest captain under coach Mihailo Petrović. His performance earned him a call-up to the senior national team, and the debuted 2005 in a 2–2 draw against Scotland. He was later selected for Austria's quad at UEFA Euro 2008.

After his contract with Sturm expired in 2008, he signed a three-year deal with Torino FC. Following relegation to Seria B, he lost his regular place and made 30 league appearances, scoring two goals. After tow years, he moved on loan to Brescia Calcio in Serie B, helping the club secure promotion to Serie A, though a permanent transfer could not be agreed.

In January 2011, Säumel joined MSV Duisburg in Germany's 2. Bundesliga on a six-month contract, making seven appearances before his contract was not renewed. After that he re-signed with SK Sturm Graz on a one-year deal with an option for a further year. After leaving Strum in summer 2013, he signed for SC Wiener Neustadt in October 2013 before joining FC Wacker Innsbruck in June 2014, where he remained until departing after the 2016/17 season. In May 2018, following a year without a club, Säumel retired from professional football.

== International career ==
Säumel was a member of the Austrian UEFA Euro 2008 squad, making his first appearance of Euro 2008 for the host nation in a 1–0 defeat to Croatia. He was substituted after 61 minutes, being replaced by the veteran Ivica Vastić.

== Coaching career ==
While still a player in the 2015/16 season, Säumel began his coaching journey as an assistant coach for the U-16 team at FC Wacker Innsbruck. After obtaining his UEFA B Licence and working as a youth coach at his former club TSV Neumarkt, he became assistant coach to Markus Schopp at TSV Hartberg in June 2018. During his tenure, the club achieved a historic first-ever qualification for European competition by defeating FK Austria Wien in the 2019/20 Bundesliga playoff.

In June 2019, he earned the UEFA A Licence and continued his coaching education. From May 2021 to March 2022, he served as assistant coach to Austrian national team manager Franco Foda and was part of the squad's staff at UEFA Euro 2020, helping Austria reach the Round of 16 before losing to Italy.

After leaving the national team in summer 2022, Säumel became head coach of Wolfsberger AC's regional league side and completed his UEFA Pro Licence. In December 2023 he was appointed head coach of Sturm Graz II, tasked with restructuring youth development and giving academy talents more first-time opportunities.

Under his guidance, Sturm Graz II qualified for the UEFA Youth League for the first time in club history including notable victories over Borussia Dortmund to reach the knockout stage.

In November 2024, Säumel was appointed interim head coach of Sturm Graz's first team following Christian Iilzer's departure to Germany. His debut saw a record 7-0 league victory over Austria Klagenfurt. After three wins in five matches, he was confirmed as permanent head coach in December 2024. The club embraced a youth-focused approach amid mid-season departure of senior players, and Säumel led Sturm to the Austrian Bundesliga title in 2025.

However, after the team sat third at the halfway point of the 2025/2026 season, Sturm Graz and Säumel parted ways in December 2025.

== Honours ==
=== As a player ===
- Third place at the 2003 UEFA European Under-19 Championship (Liechtenstein)
- Promotion to Serie A with Brescia

=== As a manager ===
- Austrian Bundesliga champion
- Reached the round of 16 at UEFA Euro 2020 (assistant coach)
- Qualified for European competition with TSV Hartberg (assistant coach)
- Participated in the UEFA Youth League (2024/2025)

== Career statistics ==
=== Club ===
Appearances and goals by club, season and competition
Club	Season	League			Cup		Europe		Other		Total	
Club	Season	Division	Apps	Goals	Apps	Goals	Apps	Goals	Apps	Goals	Apps	Goals
Sturm Graz II	2002–23	Austrian Regionalliga Central	14	0	—		—		—		14	0
Sturm Graz	2002–03	Austrian Bundesliga	12	0	2	0	1 (Note: Appearances in UEFA Cup)	0	—		15	0
Sturm Graz	2003–04	Austrian Bundesliga	32	0	4	1	—		—		36	1
Sturm Graz	2004–05	Austrian Bundesliga	36	2	3	0	—		—		39	2
Sturm Graz	2005–06	Austrian Bundesliga	18	1	2	0	4 (Note: Appearances in UEFA Intertoto Cup)	1	—		24	2
Sturm Graz	2006–07	Austrian Bundesliga	12	1	—		—		—		12	1
Sturm Graz	2007–08	Austrian Bundesliga	30	5	—		—		—		30	5
Sturm Graz	Total		140	9	11	1	4	1	—		155	11
Torino	2008–09	Serie A	19	2	2	0	—		—		21	2
Torino	2009–10	Serie B	11	0	—		—		—		11	0
Torino	Total		30	2	2	0	—		—		32	2
Brscia (loan)	2009–10	Serie B	10	0	—		—		2 (Note: Appearances in Serie B Play-off)	0	12	0
MSV Duisburg	2010–11	2. Bundesliga	7	0	0	0	—		—		7	0
Sturm Graz	2011–12	Austrian Bundesliga	15	0	1	0	4 (Note: Two appearances in UEFA Champions League, two appearances in UEFA Europa League)	0	—		20	0
Sturm Graz	2012–13	Austrian Bundesliga	12	2	1	1	—		—		13	3
Sturm Graz	Total		30	3	2	1	4	0	—		36	3
Wacker Innsbruck	2014–15	2. Liga	32	2	2	0	—		—		34	2
Wacker Innsbruck	2015–16	2. Liga	25	1	1	0	—		—		26	1
Wacker Innsbruck	2016–17	2. Liga	22	2	1	0	—		—		23	2
Wacker Innsbruck	Total		79	5	4	0	—		—		83	5
Career total			337	21	19	2	9	1	2	0	350	24

=== International ===
Appearances and goals by national team and year
National team	Year	Apps	Goals
Austria	2005	2	0
Austria	2007	5	0
Austria	2008	11	0
Austria	2009	1	0
Austria	2012	1	0
Total		20	0

=== Managerial ===
As of match played 8 February 2026

Managerial record by team and tenure
Team	From	To	Record							
Team	From	To	G	W	D	L	GF	GA	GD	Win %
SK Sturm Graz	15 November 2024	22 December 2025	56	27	7	22	84	78	+6	48.21
Total			56	27	7	22	84	78	+6	48.21
