= Bernhard Schachner =

Austrian footballer

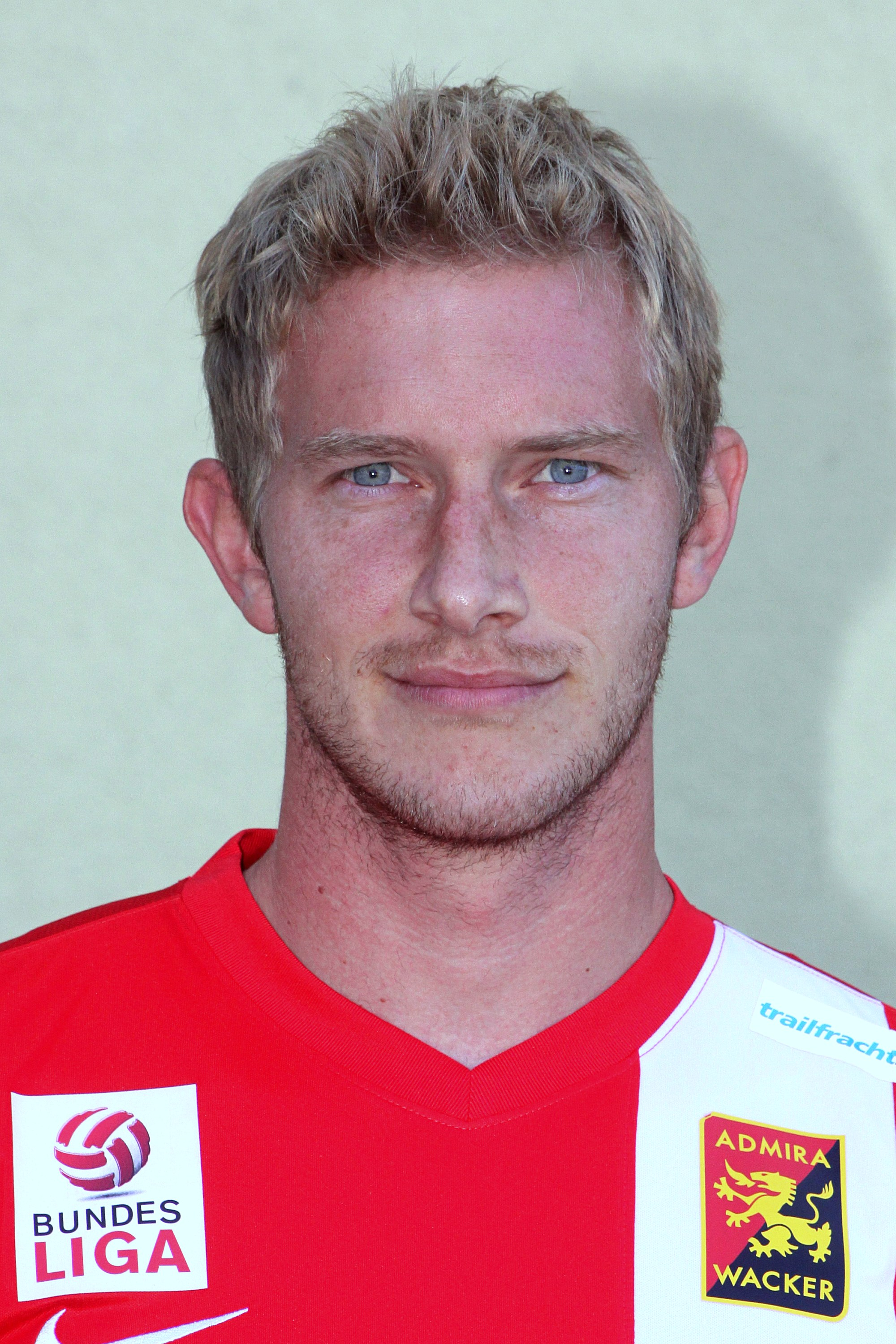

Personal information
- Full name: Bernhard Schachner
- Date of birth: 10 January 1986 (age 40)
- Place of birth: Mödling, Austria
- Height: 1.78 m (5 ft 10 in)
- Position: Midfielder

Senior career*
Years	Team	Apps	(Gls)
2004–2007	Admira Wacker	52	(0)
2007–2008	SK Schwadorf	10	(1)
2008–2015	Admira Wacker	98	(6)
2015–2017	SV Stripfing/Weiden		

International career^{‡}
2006–2007	Austria U21	2	(0)
- * Club domestic league appearances and goals as of 12:34, 18 October 2013 (UTC) ‡ National team caps and goals as of 12:34, 18 October 2013 (UTC)

Bernhard Schachner (born 10 January 1986) is an Austrian footballer who spent most of his career with Admira Wacker.

Problems with an achilles tendon led to his retirement in 2015.
