= Lukas Thürauer =

Austrian footballer

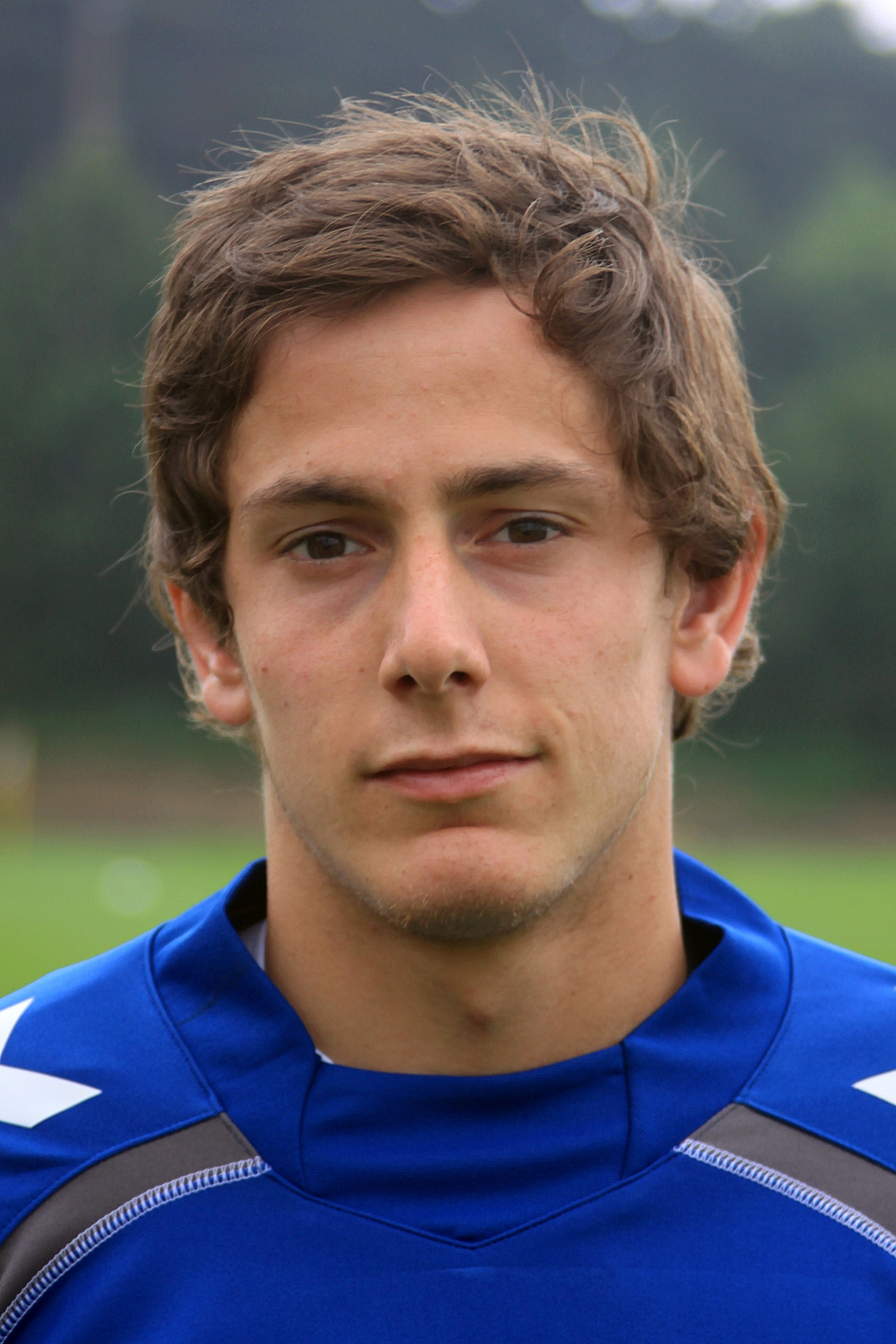

Personal information
- Date of birth: 21 December 1987 (age 38)
- Place of birth: Krems an der Donau, Austria
- Height: 1.83 m (6 ft 0 in)
- Position: Midfielder

Team information
- Current team: Kremser SC
- Number: 13

Youth career
- 1994–2000: Bergern SV
- 2000–2002: Kremser SC
- 2002–2007: SKN St. Pölten

Senior career*
Years	Team	Apps	(Gls)
2007–2012	SKN St. Pölten	129	(35)
2012–2015	Admira Wacker	83	(8)
2015–2018	SKN St. Pölten	73	(14)
2018–	Kremser SC	60	(16)
- * Club domestic league appearances and goals as of 14:07, 17 January 2021 (UTC)

Lukas Thürauer (born 21 December 1987) is an Austrian footballer who plays for Kremser SC.

== Career statistics ==
As of match played on 18 November 2017.

Appearances and goals by club, season and competition
Club	Season	League			Cup		Continental		Total	
Club	Season	Division	Apps	Goals	Apps	Goals	Apps	Goals	Apps	Goals
SKN St. Pölten	2008–09	First League	32	8	2	0	—		34	8
SKN St. Pölten	2009–10	First League	30	4	1	1	—		31	5
SKN St. Pölten	2010–11	First League	25	12	1	0	—		26	12
SKN St. Pölten	2011–12	First league	9	0	0	0	—		9	0
SKN St. Pölten	Total		96	24	4	1	—		100	25
Admira Wacker Mödling	2011–12	Austrian Bundesliga	9	0	0	0	—		9	0
Admira Wacker Mödling	2012–13	Austrian Bundesliga	32	3	1	0	2 (Note: Appearances in the 2012–13 UEFA Europa League.)	1	35	4
Admira Wacker Mödling	2013–14	Austrian Bundesliga	26	2	4	1	—		30	3
Admira Wacker Mödling	2014–15	Austrian Bundesliga	16	3	1	1	—		17	4
Admira Wacker Mödling	Total		83	8	6	2	2	1	91	11
SKN St. Pölten	2014–15	First League	10	1	0	0	—		10	1
SKN St. Pölten	2015–16	First League	29	8	4	1	—		33	9
SKN St. Pölten	2016–17	Austrian Bundesliga	27	3	3	2	—		30	5
SKN St. Pölten	2017–18	Austrian Bundesliga	7	2	1	0	—		8	2
SKN St. Pölten	Total		73	14	8	3	—		81	17
Kremser SC	2022–23	Austrian Regionalliga East	0	0	0	0	—		0	0
Career total			252	46	18	6	2	1	272	53
