= Daniel Drescher =

Austrian footballer

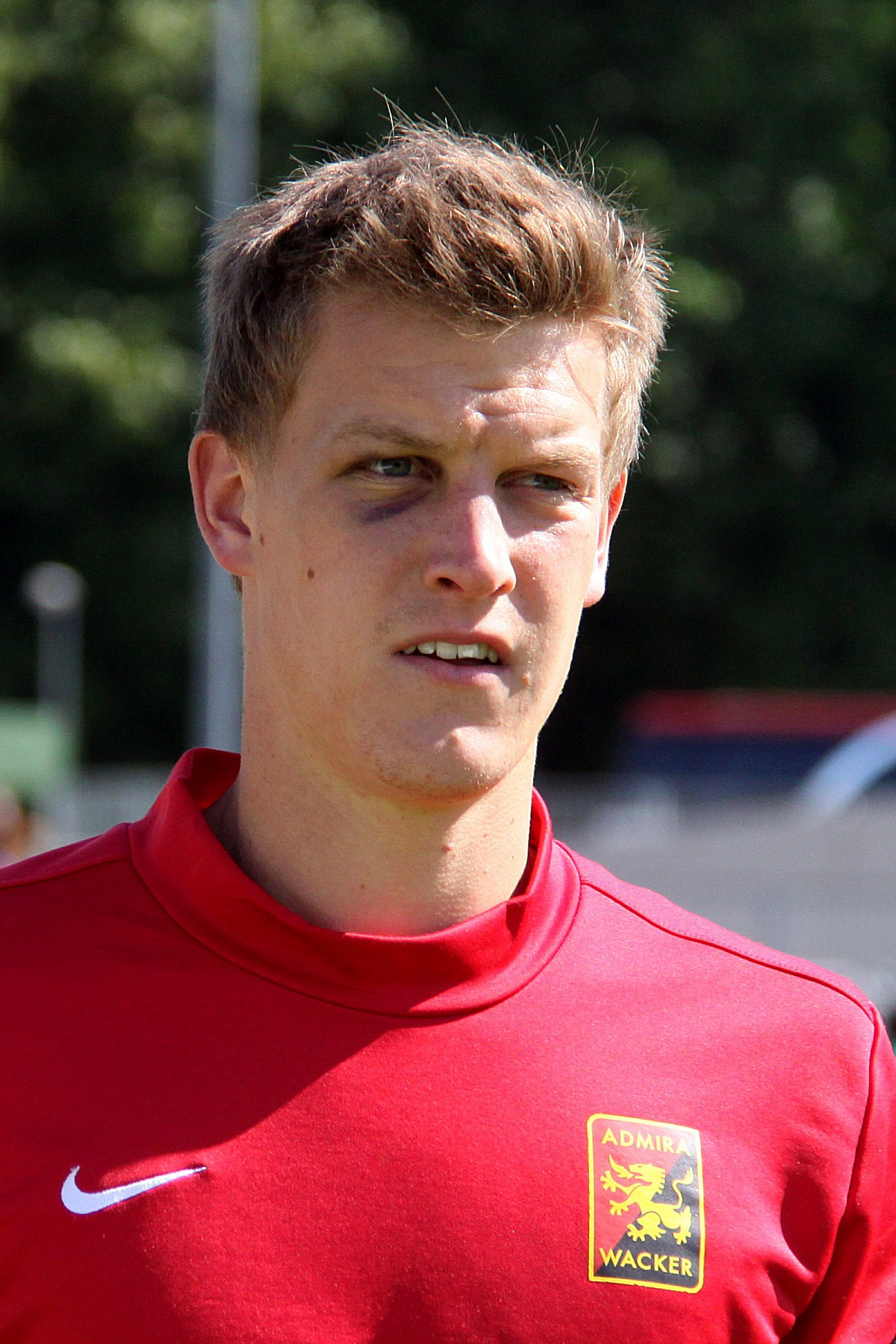

Personal information
- Date of birth: 7 October 1989 (age 37)
- Place of birth: Vienna, Austria
- Height: 1.90 m (6 ft 3 in)
- Position: Defender

Team information
- Current team: TWL Elektra

Youth career
- 1999–2007: Admira Wacker

Senior career*
Years	Team	Apps	(Gls)
2007–2014	Admira Wacker	100	(2)
2014–2014	Wolfsberger AC	52	(4)
2018–2022	SKN St. Pölten	61	(0)
2022–	TWL Elektra	0	(0)

International career^{‡}
2009–2010	Austria U20	2	(1)
- * Club domestic league appearances and goals as of 2 March 2022 ‡ National team caps and goals as of 15 June 2014

Daniel Drescher (born 7 October 1989) is an Austrian professional footballer who plays for TWL Elektra and is noted for his tackling abilities and aerial prowess.

== Club statistics ==
Club	Season	League		Cup		League Cup		Europe		Total	
Club	Season	Apps	Goals	Apps	Goals	Apps	Goals	Apps	Goals	Apps	Goals
Admira Wacker
Admira Wacker	2006–07	4	0	0	0	0	0	0	0	4	0
Admira Wacker	2007–08	22	0	0	0	0	0	0	0	22	0
Admira Wacker	2008–09	0	0	0	0	0	0	0	0	0	0
Admira Wacker	2009–10	2	0	0	0	0	0	0	0	2	0
Admira Wacker	2010–11	26	1	1	0	0	0	0	0	27	1
Admira Wacker	2011–12	28	1	2	0	0	0	0	0	30	1
Admira Wacker	2012–13	14	0	2	0	0	0	3	0	19	0
Admira Wacker	2013–14	4	0	1	0	0	0	0	0	5	0
Admira Wacker	Total	100	2	5	0	0	0	3	0	108	2
Career Total		100	2	5	0	0	0	3	0	108	2

Updated to games played as of 16 June 2014.
