= Gernot Plassnegger =

Austrian footballer (born 1978)

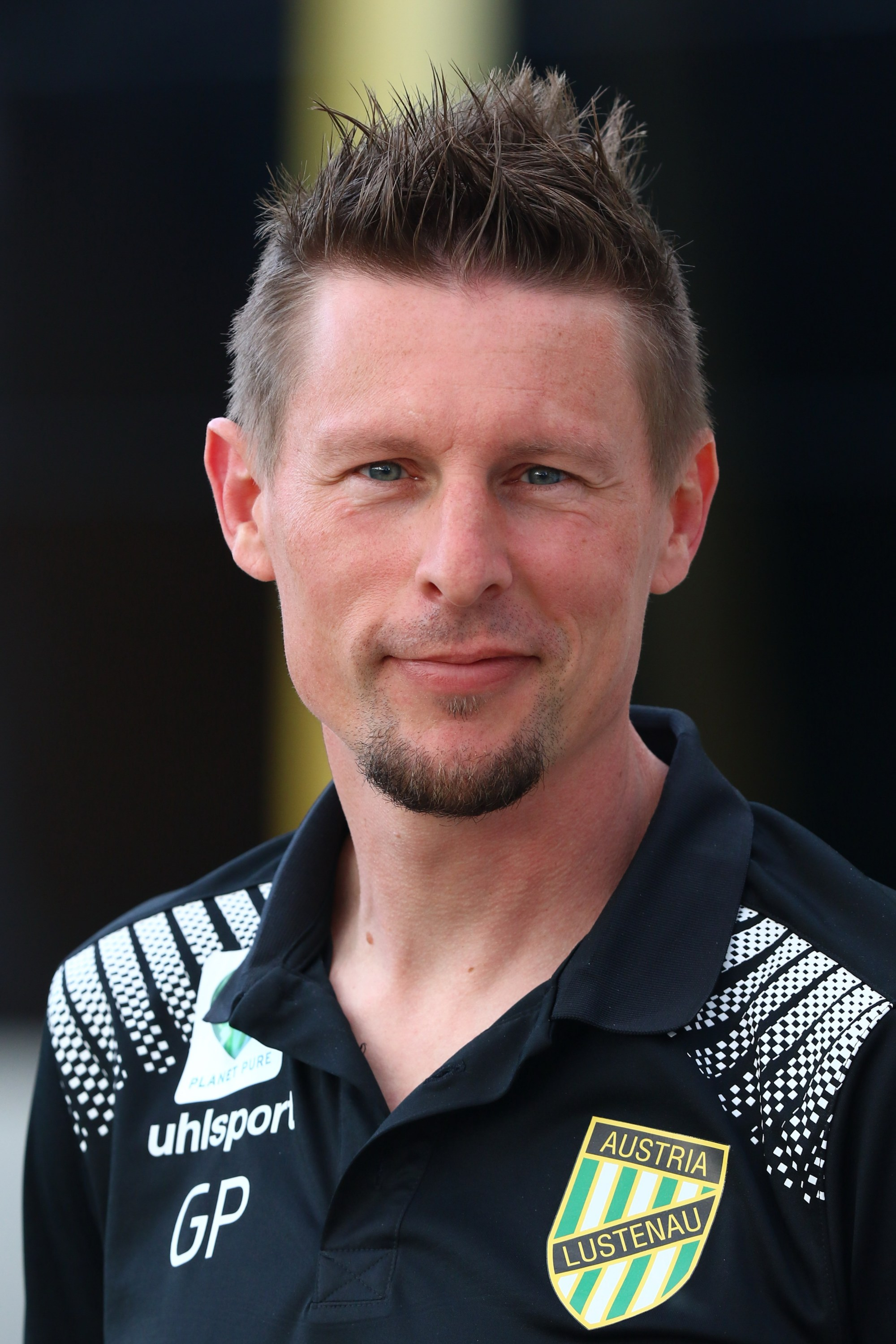

Personal information
- Date of birth: 23 March 1978 (age 48)
- Place of birth: Leoben, Austria
- Height: 1.79 m (5 ft 10 in)
- Position: Right back

Youth career
- FC Trofaiach
- FC Puch

Senior career*
Years	Team	Apps	(Gls)
1995–1998	Austria Salzburg	40	(4)
1998–2001	Austria Wien	64	(6)
2001	1. FC Saarbrücken	16	(2)
2001–2002	VfL Wolfsburg	5	(0)
2002–2003	SV Waldhof Mannheim	26	(10)
2003–2004	Hansa Rostock	20	(1)
2004–2006	Grazer AK	59	(3)
2006–2007	Rapid Wien	11	(0)
2007–2008	Austria Kärnten	18	(0)
2008–2009	Ergotelis	25	(0)
2009–2013	Admira Wacker	118	(0)

International career
2006	Austria	1	(0)

Managerial career
- 2013–2017: Grazer AK
- 2017–2019: SC Austria Lustenau
- 2020–2021: Grazer AK
- * Club domestic league appearances and goals

Gernot Plassnegger (born 23 March 1978) is an Austrian football coach and a former player.

== Coaching career ==
On 4 September 2019 he left SC Austria Lustenau by mutual consent.
