= Martin Rodler =

Austrian footballer

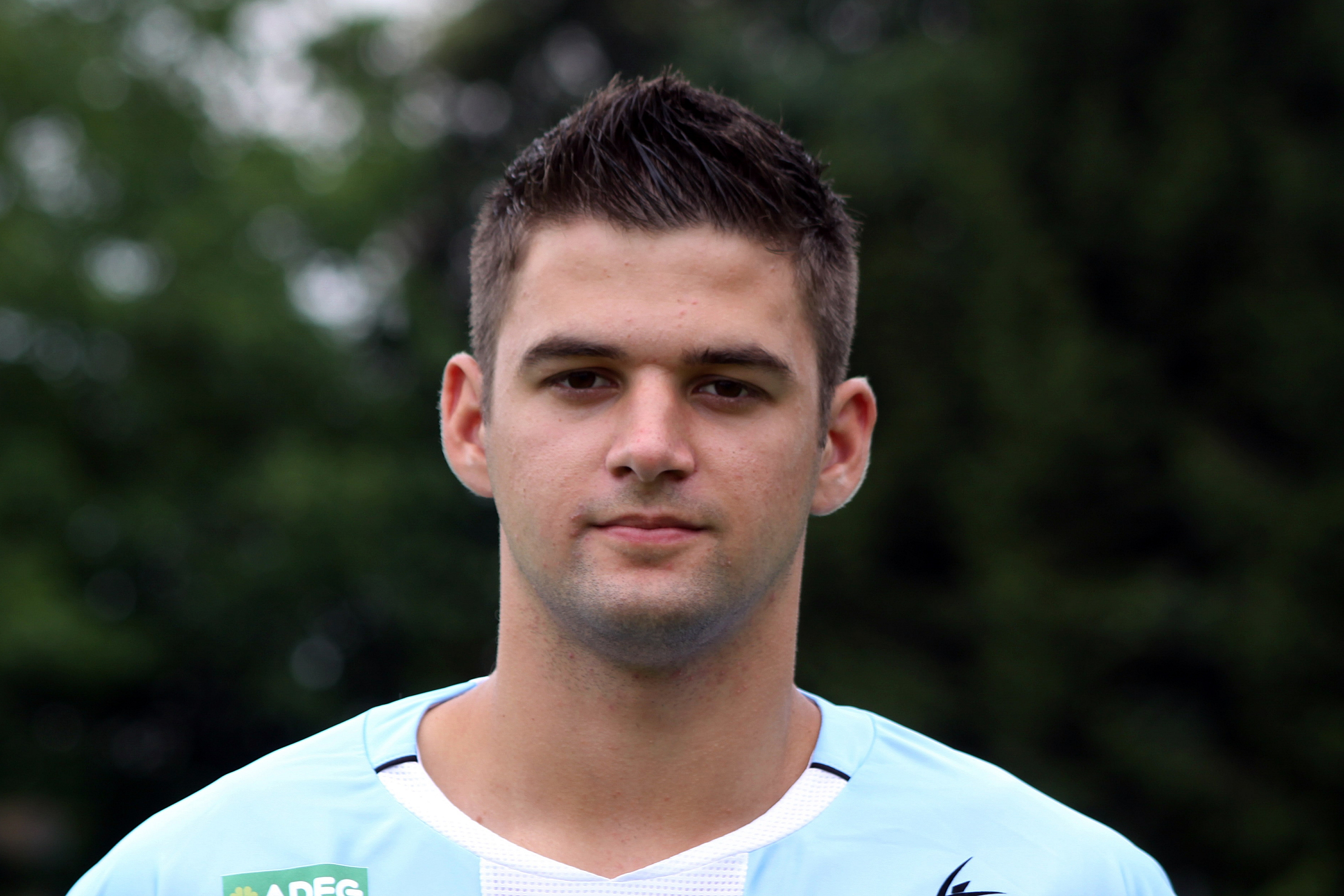

Personal information
- Full name: Martin Rodler
- Date of birth: 24 February 1989 (age 37)
- Place of birth: Hartberg, Austria
- Position: Defender

Team information
- Current team: SV Lafnitz
- Number: 26

Senior career*
Years	Team	Apps	(Gls)
2007–2011	TSV Hartberg	73	(11)
2011–2014	SV Mattersburg	47	(5)
2014–	SV Lafnitz	104	(6)
- * Club domestic league appearances and goals as of 13 June 2018

Martin Rodler (born 24 February 1989) is an Austrian footballer who plays for SV Lafnitz.
