= Issiaka Ouédraogo =

Burkinabé footballer

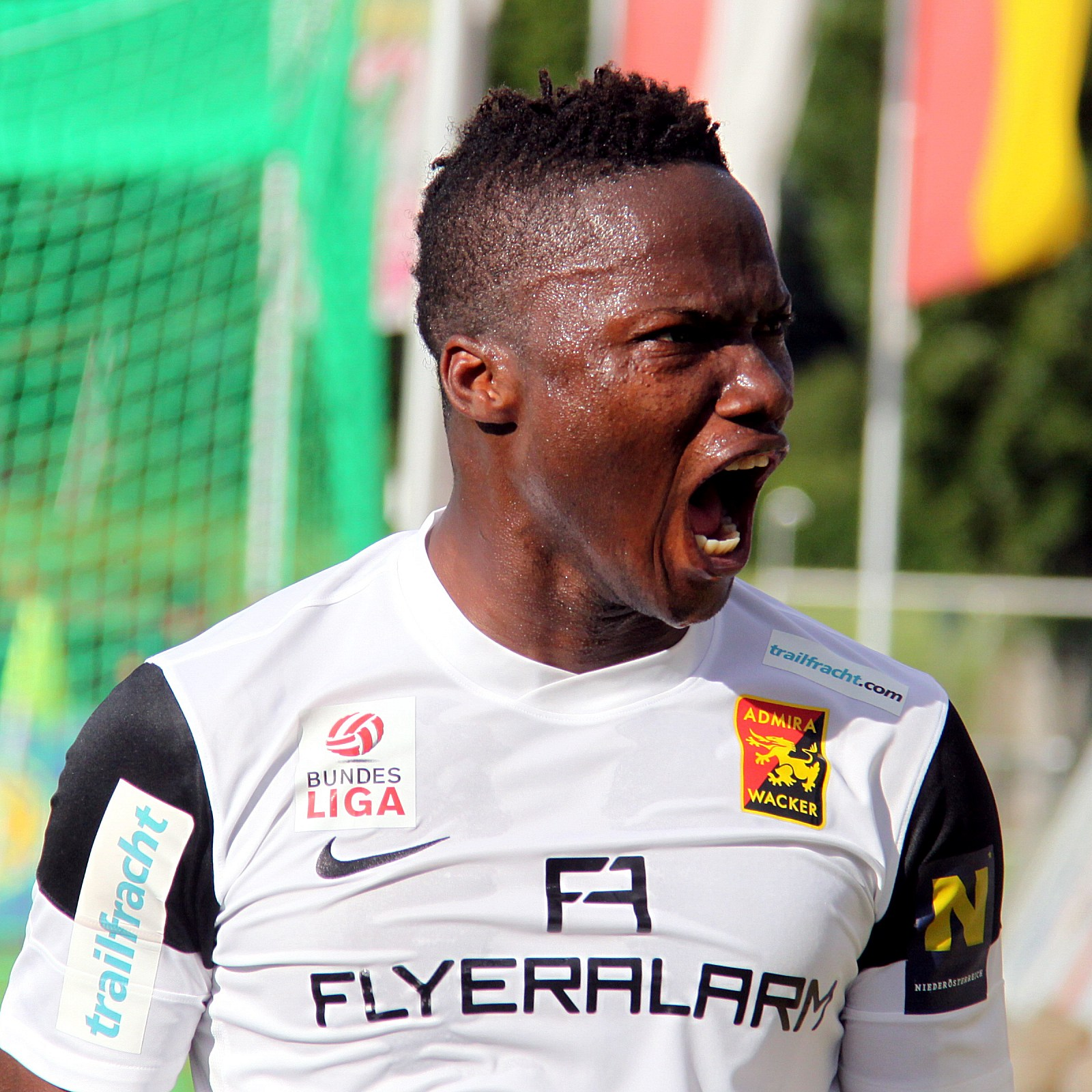

Personal information
- Date of birth: 19 August 1988 (age 38)
- Place of birth: Ouagadougou, Burkina Faso
- Height: 1.79 m (5 ft 10 in)
- Position: Forward

Team information
- Current team: FC Rohrendorf
- Number: 9

Youth career
- USFA Ouagadougou

Senior career*
Years	Team	Apps	(Gls)
2008–2010	Red Bull Salzburg	0	(0)
2010–2011	SV Grödig	33	(4)
2011–2015	Admira Wacker	113	(19)
2015–2016	Wolfsberger AC	21	(7)
2016	Hatta Club	2	(0)
2017–2018	Wolfsberger AC	41	(3)
2018–2020	SKN St. Pölten	24	(6)
2020–2021	AS SONABEL		
2021	SKU Amstetten	17	(1)
2021–2022	FC Marchfeld	24	(7)
2022–2023	FC Mauerwerk	29	(8)
2023–	FC Rohrendorf	13	(3)

International career
2011–2015	Burkina Faso	21	(1)
- * Club domestic league appearances and goals as of 23:31, 30 March 2024 (UTC)

Issiaka Ouédraogo (born 19 August 1988) is a Burkinabé footballer who plays as a forward for the Austrian 2. Landesliga club FC Rohrendorf.
