= Manuel Weber =

Austrian footballer (born 1985)

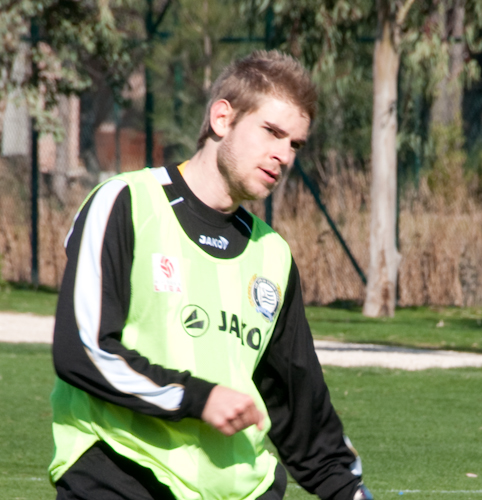

Personal information
- Date of birth: August 28, 1985 (age 41)
- Place of birth: Villach, Austria
- Height: 1.82 m (6 ft 0 in)
- Position: Midfielder

Team information
- Current team: Wolfsberger AC
- Number: 6

Senior career*
Years	Team	Apps	(Gls)
2004–2007	FC Kärnten	73	(7)
2007–2009	Austria Kärnten	61	(4)
2009–2014	Sturm Graz	142	(9)
2014–2016	Wolfsberger AC	28	(2)
2016–	SV Rosegg	0	(0)

International career
2011	Austria	1	(0)
- * Club domestic league appearances and goals as of 22 July 2016

Manuel Weber (born 28 August 1985 in Villach) is an Austrian footballer who plays for SV Rosegg.

== Club career ==
He formerly played for FC Kärnten. He was the captain of Austria Kärnten until he signed with Sturm Graz in June 2009. In summer 2014, after five years with Sturm Graz, Weber moved to fellow Austrian Bundesliga side Wolfsberger AC.
