= Zell am Moos =

- Municipality
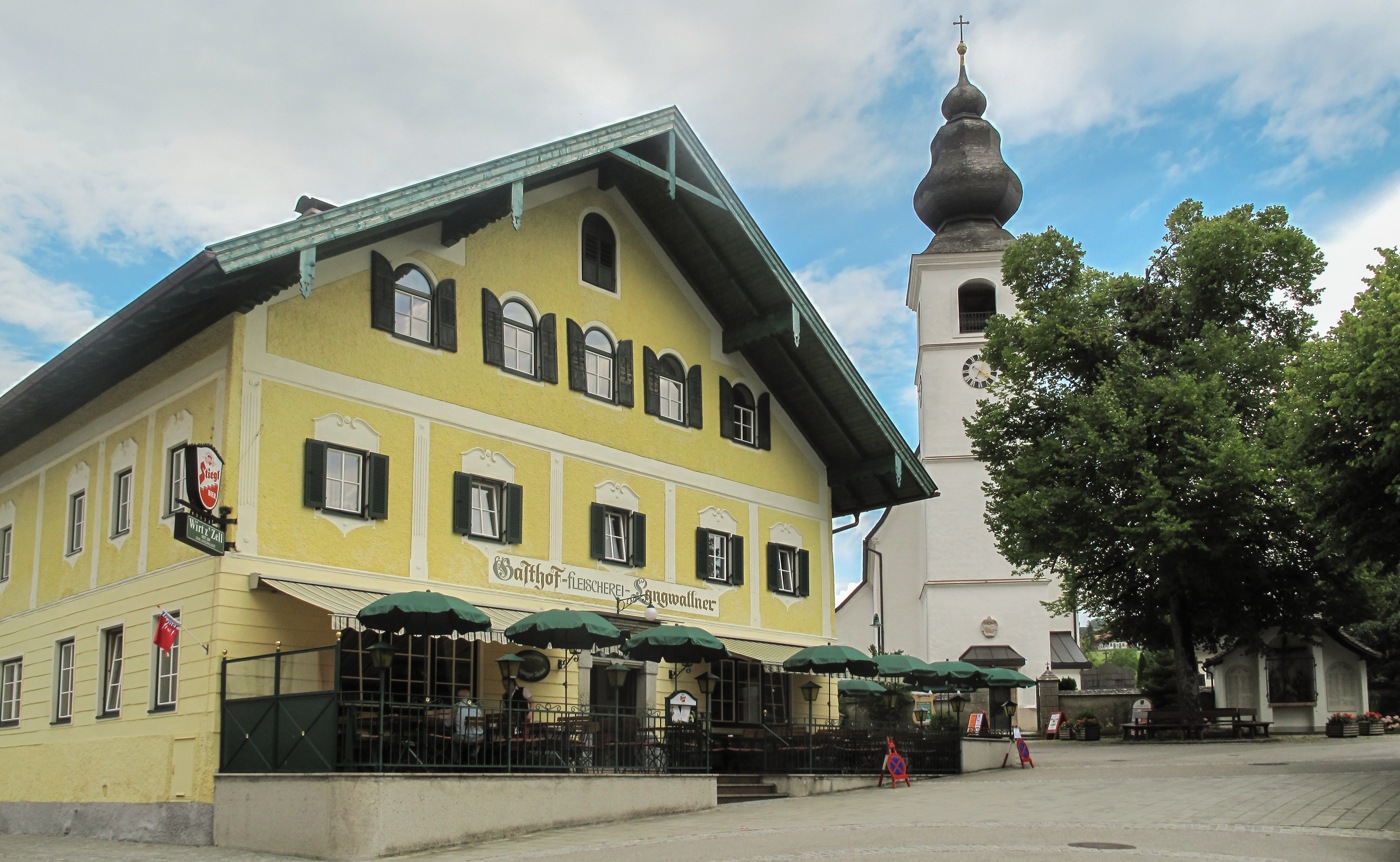

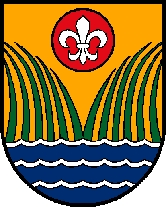
- Coat of arms

- Location within Austria
- Coordinates: 47°54′01″N 13°19′01″E
- Country: Austria
- State: Upper Austria
- District: Vöcklabruck

Government
  - Mayor: Johann Wiesinger (ÖVP)

Area
  - Total: 24.46 km^{2} (9.44 sq mi)
- Elevation: 573 m (1,880 ft)

Population (2018-01-01)
  - Total: 1,575
  - Density: 64.39/km^{2} (166.8/sq mi)
- Time zone: UTC+1 (CET)
  - Summer (DST): UTC+2 (CEST)
- Postal code: 4893
- Area code: 06234
- Vehicle registration: VB
- Website: www.zell-moos.at

Zell am Moos is a municipality in the district of Vöcklabruck in the Austrian state of Upper Austria.

== Population ==
Historical population
Year	Pop.	±%
1991	1,190	—
2001	1,390	+16.8%
2016	1,589	+14.3%
