= Carlos Merino =

Spanish footballer

Personal information
- Full name: Carlos Gustavo Merino González
- Date of birth: 15 March 1980 (age 46)
- Place of birth: Bilbao, Spain
- Height: 1.74 m (5 ft 9 in)
- Position: Midfielder

Youth career
- 1996–1997: University of Texas
- 1997–1999: Nottingham Forest

Senior career*
Years	Team	Apps	(Gls)
1999–2000	Nottingham Forest	7	(0)
2000–2003	Athletic Bilbao	8	(0)
2001–2002	→ Burgos (loan)	20	(0)
2004–2005	Numancia	43	(6)
2005–2007	Gimnàstic	55	(3)
2007–2008	Las Palmas	13	(0)
2008–2010	Albacete	57	(7)
2011–2013	Wacker Innsbruck	70	(9)
2013–2014	Panthrakikos	2	(0)
2014–2016	Portugalete	49	(3)
Total		324	(28)
- * Club domestic league appearances and goals

Carlos Gustavo Merino González (born 15 March 1980) is a Spanish former professional footballer who played as a midfielder.

== Club career ==
Born in Bilbao, Biscay, Merino started his senior career with Nottingham Forest in the English Football League Championship, and signed in March 2000 for hometown's Athletic Bilbao – the deal being effective as of the 2000–01 season– where he struggled with first-team opportunities, also being loaned to Segunda División club Burgos CF.

After being released in January 2004, Merino joined CD Numancia. In 2004–05's La Liga he played and scored regularly, although the Soria side were relegated one year after promoting. He went on to have second-tier stints with Gimnàstic de Tarragona, UD Las Palmas and Albacete Balompié, also representing the first side in the top flight.

In the 2011 January transfer window, aged nearly 31, Merino moved abroad again, signing for FC Wacker Innsbruck in Austria and sharing teams with compatriot Iñaki Bea. On 15 September 2013 he moved countries again, joining Panthrakikos F.C. of Super League Greece and being released on 7 January of the following year.

Merino returned to both his homeland and native region in July 2014, signing with Club Portugalete in the Tercera División.
