= Andreas Schrott =

Austrian footballer and manager

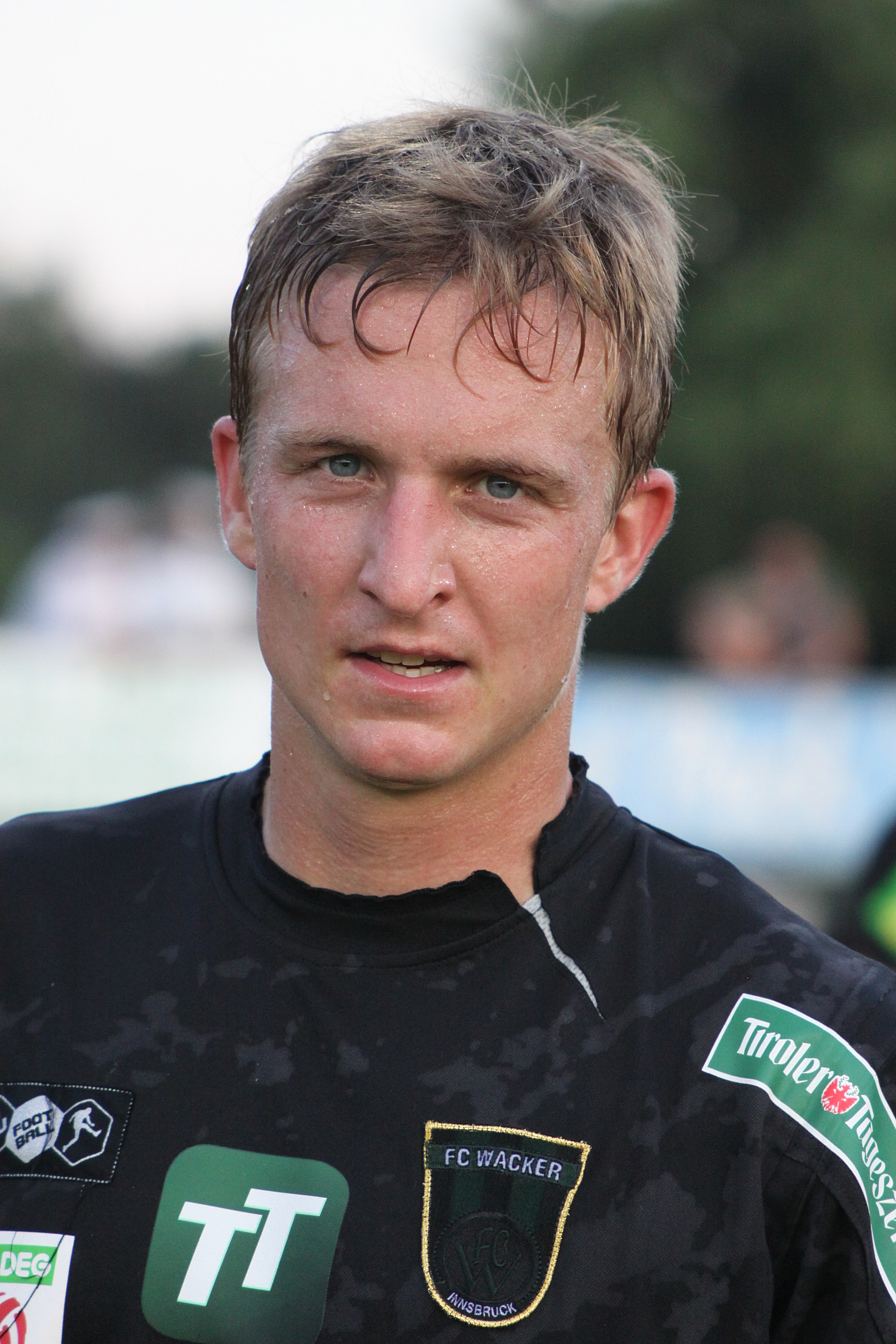

Personal information
- Full name: Andreas Schrott
- Date of birth: 24 August 1981 (age 45)
- Place of birth: Hall in Tirol, Austria
- Position: Left back

Youth career
- 1987–1995: SV Absam
- 1995–1996: Innsbrucker AC
- 1996–2000: Tirol Innsbruck
- 2000–2002: WSG Wattens

Senior career*
Years	Team	Apps	(Gls)
2002–2003	WSG Wattens	26	(7)
2003–2005	Wacker Tirol	61	(2)
2005–2006	Grazer AK	26	(1)
2006–2010	Wacker Innsbruck	96	(4)
2011	USK Anif	14	(1)
2011–2012	Admira Wacker	38	(3)
2013–2014	FC Liefering	12	(2)

Managerial career
- 2016: FC Wacker Innsbruck (interim manager)
- * Club domestic league appearances and goals as of 28 June 2016

Andreas Schrott (born 24 August 1981) is an Austrian football manager and former player.

In 2014, he left Liefering and joined FC Wacker Innsbruck as assistant coach.
