= José Antonio Solano =

Spanish footballer

Personal information
- Full name: José Antonio Solano Moreno
- Date of birth: 4 February 1985 (age 41)
- Place of birth: Cartagena, Spain
- Height: 1.86 m (6 ft 1 in)
- Position: Centre back

Youth career
- Cádiz

Senior career*
Years	Team	Apps	(Gls)
2004–2005	Cádiz B		
2005–2006	Leganés	25	(1)
2006–2008	Écija	55	(0)
2008–2009	Barcelona B	0	(0)
2009–2010	Écija	22	(0)
2010–2012	Badajoz	45	(4)
2012–2014	Wolfsberger AC	24	(4)
2014–2015	Horn	13	(0)
2015–2016	San Fernando	16	(2)

International career
2003	Spain U18	1	(0)
- * Club domestic league appearances and goals

José Antonio Solano Moreno (born 4 February 1985) is a Spanish former professional footballer who played as a central defender.
