= Leonhard Kaufmann =

Austrian footballer

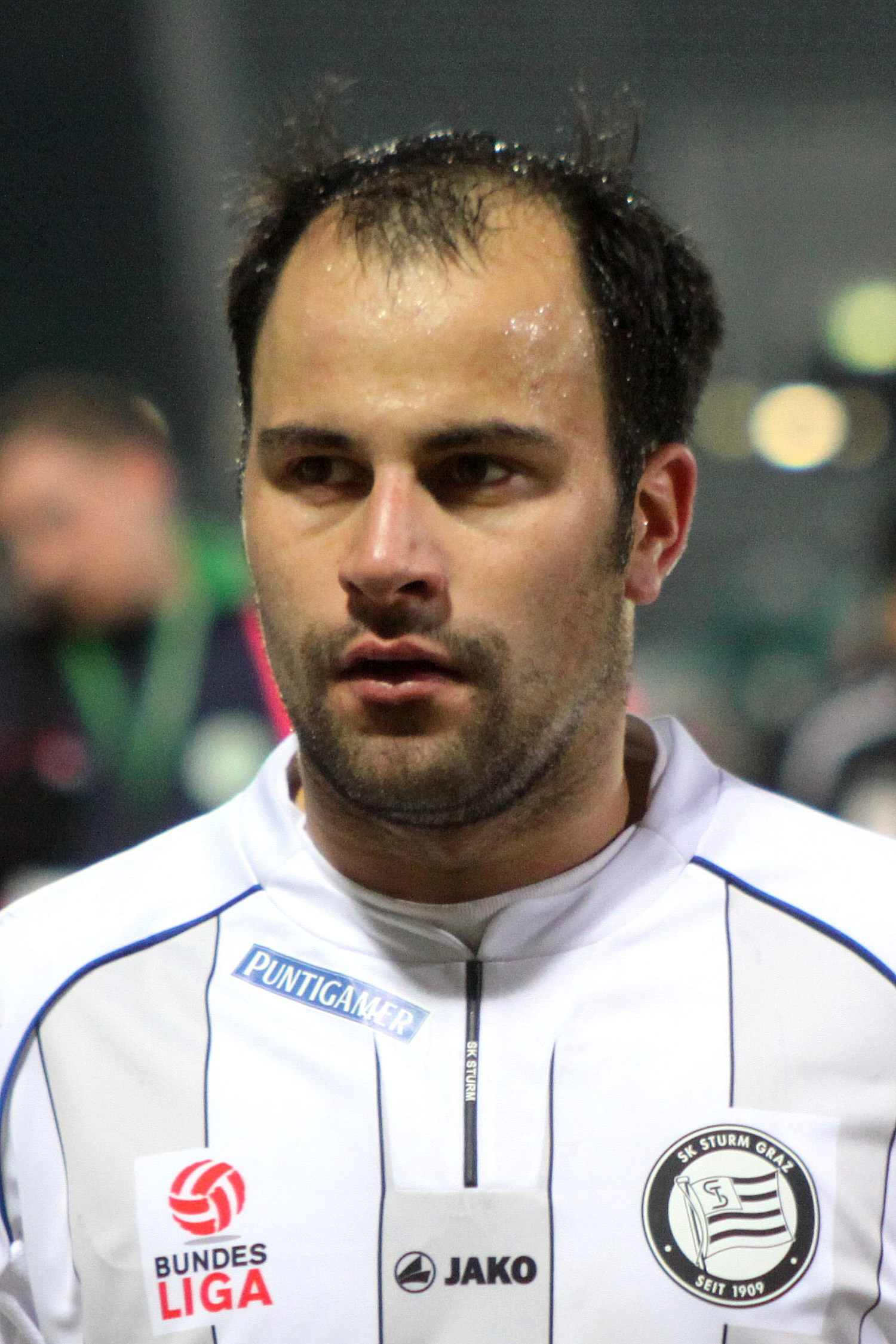

Personal information
- Full name: Leonhard Kaufmann
- Date of birth: 12 January 1989 (age 37)
- Place of birth: Güssing, Austria
- Height: 1.72 m (5 ft 7 1/2 in)
- Position: Midfielder

Team information
- Current team: SV Austria Salzburg
- Number: 26

Youth career
- 1995–2003: UFC Fehring
- 2003–2006: AKA Sturm Graz

Senior career*
| Years | Team | Apps | (Gls) |
| 2006–2007 | Sturm Graz II | 19 | (4) |
| 2007–2009 | Sturm Graz | 7 | (1) |
| 2009–2010 | Austria Kärnten | 34 | (5) |
| 2010–2012 | LASK Linz | 58 | (5) |
| 2012–2014 | Sturm Graz | 17 | (0) |
| 2014–2015 | Energie Cottbus | 27 | (3) |
| 2015– | SV Austria Salzburg | 21 | (7) |

International career
| 2007 | Austria U19 | 4 | (0) |
- * Club domestic league appearances and goals as of 3 April 2016

Leonhard Kaufmann (born 12 January 1989) is an Austrian professional association football player who is currently playing for Austrian Erste Liga side SV Austria Salzburg.

== Career ==
After one year with SK Austria Kärnten the talented offensive midfielder signed on 9 June 2010 for LASK Linz.
