= 2009–10 SK Rapid Wien season =

Rapid Wien
2009–10 season
- President: Rudolf Edlinger
- Coach: Peter Pacult
- Stadium: Gerhard Hanappi Stadium, Vienna, Austria
- Bundesliga: 3rd
- ÖFB-Cup: Quarter-finals
- Europa League: Group stage (4th)
- Top goalscorer: League: Steffen Hofmann (20); All: Nikica Jelavić (29)
- Highest home attendance: 17,800
- Lowest home attendance: 13,800

The 2009–10 SK Rapid Wien season was the 112th season in club history.

== Squad statistics ==
No.	Nat.	Name	Age	League		Cup		Europa League		Total		Discipline	
No.	Nat.	Name	Age	Apps	Goals	Apps	Goals	Apps	Goals	Apps	Goals	Booked	Sent off (straight red)
Goalkeepers
1	(Austria)	Raimund Hedl	34	14		4		1		19		2	
24	(Austria)	Helge Payer	29	22				11		33		1	
Defenders
3	(Austria)	Jürgen Patocka	31	18+4	1	2		8+1		28+5	1	6	
4	(Montenegro)	Milan Jovanovic	31	4+5		1		4+1		9+6		1	
6	(Austria)	Christian Thonhofer	24	12+1		1		1+2		14+3		6	
7	(Austria)	Stefan Kulovits	26	16+3		2+1		3+2		21+6		6	
14	(Austria)	Markus Katzer	29	26	4	2+1		12		40+1	4	10	
18	(Austria)	Hannes Eder	25	18+1		2+1	1	5		25+2	1	7	
22	(Norway)	Ragnvald Soma	29	33	1	3		7		43	1	4	
23	(Austria)	Andreas Dober	23	23+5	1	4		9+1		36+6	1	13	
Midfielders
8	(Finland)	Markus Heikkinen	30	28	1	2	1	10		40	2	6	1
11	(Germany)	Steffen Hofmann	28	36	20	3		12	5	51	25	5	
17	(Austria)	Veli Kavlak	20	21+3	2	2		7		30+3	2	2	
19	(Austria)	Christopher Drazan	18	13+17	2	3+1	3	4+6	1	20+24	6	6	
27	(Montenegro)	Branko Boskovic	29	21+8	3	2	1	6+2		29+10	4	4	
28	(Austria)	Christopher Trimmel	22	6+18	5	2+1	1	4+4	2	12+23	8	3	
35	(Austria)	Yasin Pehlivan	20	24+4		2+1		11		37+5		10	1
36	(Austria)	Muhammed Ildiz	18					0+1		0+1			
Forwards
9	(Albania)	Hamdi Salihi	25	13+10	15	1+2	1	1+4	1	15+16	17	2	
16	(Croatia)	Nikica Jelavic	23	31+2	18	3	2	10+2	9	44+4	29	6	1
20	(Austria)	René Gartler	23	9+10	3	0+1		0+1		9+12	3		1
33	(Austria)	Mario Konrad	26	5+10	2	2+1	3	2+1	1	9+12	6	2	
Players who left after the start of the season
9	(Austria)	Stefan Maierhofer	26	2+1	1	1	1	2+3	2	5+4	4	4	1
21	(Austria)	Erwin Hoffer	22	1				2	1	3	1	2	

=== Goal scorers ===
Rank	Name	Bundesliga	Cup	Europa League	Total
1	(Croatia) Nikica Jelavic	18	2	9	29
2	(Germany) Steffen Hofmann	20		5	25
3	(Albania) Hamdi Salihi	15	1	1	17
4	(Austria) Christopher Trimmel	5	1	2	8
5	(Austria) Christopher Drazan	2	3	1	6
5	(Austria) Mario Konrad	2	3	1	6
7	(Montenegro) Branko Boskovic	3	1		4
7	(Austria) Markus Katzer	4			4
7	(Austria) Stefan Maierhofer	1	1	2	4
10	(Austria) Rene Gartler	3			3
11	(Finland) Markus Heikkinen	1	1		2
11	(Austria) Veli Kavlak	2			2
13	(Austria) Andreas Dober	1			1
13	(Austria) Hannes Eder		1		1
13	(Austria) Erwin Hoffer			1	1
13	(Austria) Jürgen Patocka	1			1
13	(Norway) Ragnvald Soma	1			1
OG	(Lithuania) Vidas Alunderis (LASK)	1			1
Totals		80	14	22	83

== Fixtures and results ==
Win Draw Loss

=== Bundesliga ===
Rd	Date	Venue	Opponent	Res.	Att.	Goals and discipline
1	25.11.2009	H	Sturm Graz	2–1	17,200	Jelavic 16', Salihi 89' (pen.)
2	26.07.2009	A	Mattersburg	1–2	12,100	Heikkinen 78'; Pehlivan (yellow card) 32' (red card) , Maierhofer (yellow card) 72' (red card)
3	02.08.2009	H	Austria Kärnten	5–1	13,900	Hofmann S. 53', Konrad 65', Trimmel 85' 87' 90'
4	09.08.2009	A	Ried	1–1	7,600	Hofmann S. 51'
5	23.08.2009	H	LASK	4–1	17,100	Alunderis 9' (o.g.), Jelavic 18' 25', Hofmann S. 29'
6	30.08.2009	A	Austria Wien	1–1	13,400	Maierhofer 60'
7	13.09.2009	H	RB Salzburg	2–2	17,500	Hofmann S. 58', Salihi 84'
8	23.09.2009	A	Kapfenberg	1–0	6,250	Dober 77'
9	26.09.2009	H	Wiener Neustadt	3–1	17,500	Salihi 27' 88', Soma 80'
10	04.10.2009	A	Wiener Neustadt	4–0	7,030	Jelavic 10' 69', Kavlak 57', Salihi 70'
11	18.10.2009	A	Sturm Graz	0–1	15,323	Jelavic (yellow card) 90+4' (red card)
12	25.10.2009	H	Mattersburg	4–0	17,200	Katzer 6', Gartler R. 24', Salihi 86', Hofmann S. 90+3'
13	28.10.2009	A	Austria Kärnten	3–1	9,000	Drazan 82' 89', Gartler R. 85'
14	31.10.2009	H	Ried	1–0	16,300	Katzer 12'; Gartler R. (red card) 55'
15	08.11.2009	A	LASK	3–3	13,200	Jelavic 1', Hofmann S. 64' (pen.), Salihi 75'
16	22.11.2009	H	Austria Wien	4–1	17,800	Hofmann S. 6' 47', Jelavic 17', Salihi 89'
17	29.11.2009	A	RB Salzburg	0–0	23,600	
18	05.12.2009	H	Kapfenberg	3–1	15,300	Hofmann S. 18' (pen.), Jelavic 34', Salihi 85'
19	12.12.2009	H	Ried	2–1	15,300	Katzer 2', Salihi 63'
20	12.02.2010	A	LASK	2–4	9,400	Hofmann S. 54' 90+2' (pen.)
21	19.02.2010	A	Wiener Neustadt	2–2	6,400	Gartler R. 15', Trimmel 46'
22	28.02.2010	H	RB Salzburg	0–1	17,500	
23	07.03.2010	A	Kapfenberg	2–2	4,000	Katzer 66', Konrad 87'
24	14.03.2010	H	Austria Wien	2–0	17,500	Hofmann S. 67' (pen.), Jelavic 76'
25	20.03.2010	A	Sturm Graz	1–1	15,300	Jelavic 83'
26	23.03.2010	H	Mattersburg	3–0	14,800	Patocka 48', Jelavic 59', Salihi 69'
27	27.03.2010	A	Austria Kärnten	4–2	5,600	Kavlak 15', Hofmann S. 28' (pen.), Trimmel 70', Jelavic 82'
28	03.04.2010	H	Austria Kärnten	1–0	15,800	Hofmann S. 27'; Heikkinen (red card) 83'
29	09.04.2010	A	Ried	3–1	7,200	Boskovic 31', Jelavic 36', Hofmann S. 56' (pen.)
30	13.04.2010	H	LASK	0–0	13,800	
31	17.04.2010	H	Wiener Neustadt	3–0	16,900	Jelavic 21' 80', Hofmann S. 54'
32	23.04.2010	A	RB Salzburg	1–1	26,800	Hofmann S. 57'
33	30.04.2010	H	Kapfenberg	5–3	15,200	Jelavic 20' 57', Boskovic 41' 90+2', Hofmann S. 90+5'
34	05.05.2010	A	Austria Wien	0–1	13,500	
35	09.05.2010	H	Sturm Graz	4–1	17,400	Salihi 45', Hofmann S. 56' 66', Jelavic 76'
36	13.05.2010	A	Mattersburg	3–1	13,400	Salihi 17' 68' 83'

==== League table ====
Pos	Team	Pld	W	D	L	GF	GA	GD	Pts	Qualification or relegation
1	Red Bull Salzburg (C)	36	22	10	4	68	27	+41	76	Qualification to Champions League second qualifying round
2	Austria Wien	36	23	6	7	60	34	+26	75	Qualification to Europa League second qualifying round
3	Rapid Wien	36	21	10	5	80	38	+42	73	Qualification to Europa League second qualifying round
4	Sturm Graz	36	16	10	10	50	36	+14	58	Qualification to Europa League third qualifying round (Note: per 2009–10 Austrian Cup)
5	Wiener Neustadt	36	13	8	15	54	58	−4	47	

Source: weltfussball.de (in German)
Rules for classification: 1) points; 2) goal difference; 3) number of goals scored.
(C) Champions

=== Cup ===
Rd	Date	Venue	Opponent	Res.	Att.	Goals and discipline
R1	15.08.2009	A	Parndorf	3–2 (a.e.t.)	3,500	Jelavic 21', Maierhofer 30', Drazan 120'
R2	20.09.2009	A	St. Veit	7–1	2,500	Boskovic 12', Konrad 16' 63' 84', Eder H. 41', Salihi 49', Drazan 88'
R16	10.03.2010	A	BW Linz	2–1	6,500	Drazan 47', Jelavic 69'
QF	31.03.2010	A	Austria Kärnten	2–3	3,000	Heikkinen 43', Trimmel 53'

=== Europa League ===
==== Qualification ====
Rd	Date	Venue	Opponent	Res.	Att.	Goals and discipline
Q2-L1	16.07.2009	H	Vllaznia (Albania)	5–0	13,300	Hofmann S. 33' (pen.), Jelavic 68' 73', Trimmel 83', Hoffer 85'
Q2-L2	23.07.2009	A	Vllaznia (Albania)	3–0	2,000	Hofmann S. 67' 90+3', Maierhofer 76'
Q3-L1	30.07.2009	H	APOP Kinyras (Cyprus)	2–1	12,800	Maierhofer 25', Jelavic 57'
Q3-L2	06.08.2009	A	APOP Kinyras (Cyprus)	2–2 (a.e.t.)	2,500	Konrad 30', Trimmel 111'
PO-L1	20.08.2009	H	Aston Villa (England)	1–0	17,800	Jelavic 1'
PO-L2	27.08.2009	A	Aston Villa (England)	1–2	23,563	Jelavic 76'

==== Group stage ====
Rd	Date	Venue	Opponent	Res.	Att.	Goals and discipline
G1	17.09.2009	H	HSV (Germany)	3–0	49,850	Hofmann S. 35', Jelavic 44', Drazan 76'
G2	01.10.2009	A	Celtic (Scotland)	1–1	55,000	Jelavic 4'
G3	22.10.2009	A	Hapoel Tel Aviv (Israel)	1–5	10,000	Hofmann S. 31'
G4	05.11.2009	H	Hapoel Tel Aviv (Israel)	0–3	49,000	
G5	02.12.2009	A	HSV (Germany)	0–2	45,737	
G6	17.12.2009	H	Celtic (Scotland)	3–3	48,000	Jelavic 1' 8', Salihi 19'
