= 2007–08 SK Rapid Wien season =

Rapid Wien
2007–08 season
- President: Rudolf Edlinger
- Coach: Peter Pacult
- Stadium: Gerhard Hanappi Stadium, Vienna, Austria
- Bundesliga: Champion (32nd title)
- UI Cup: 3rd round
- UEFA Cup: 1st Round
- Top goalscorer: League: Steffen Hofmann (10); Erwin Hoffer (10); All: Steffen Hofmann (18)
- Highest home attendance: 18,400
- Lowest home attendance: 11,800

The 2007–08 SK Rapid Wien season was the 110th season in club history.

== Squad statistics ==
No.	Nat.	Name	Age	League		UEFA Competitions		Total		Discipline	
No.	Nat.	Name	Age	Apps	Goals	Apps	Goals	Apps	Goals	Booked	Sent off (straight red)
Goalkeepers
1	(Austria)	Raimund Hedl	32	0+1				0+1			
24	(Austria)	Helge Payer	27	36		8		44			
Defenders
2	(Croatia)	Mario Tokic	31	21+1	1	5		26+1	1	4	
3	(Austria)	Jürgen Patocka	29	35	2	7		42	2	8	
4	(Austria)	Martin Hiden	34	11+6	2	6		17+6	2	2	
6	(Austria)	Christian Thonhofer	22	24+2		4+1		28+3		8	1
13	(Austria)	Markus Katzer	27	15+2	3	3+1		18+3	3	7	
16	(Austria)	Mario Sara	25	3+1		3+1		6+2		1	
18	(Austria)	Hannes Eder	23	11+3	2	0+4		11+7	2	1	1
23	(Austria)	Andreas Dober	21	23+1	4	4+1		27+2	4	6	
32	(Austria)	Stephan Palla	18	0+1				0+1			
Midfielders
7	(Austria)	Stefan Kulovits	24	14+9	1	1+2		15+11	1	5	1
8	(Finland)	Markus Heikkinen	28	28	1	8		36	1	5	
11	(Germany)	Steffen Hofmann	26	36	10	8	8	44	18	3	
14	(Austria)	Ümit Korkmaz	21	22+9	2	4+2		26+11	2	2	
17	(Austria)	Veli Kavlak	18	20+7	2	3+1	1	23+8	3	5	
22	(Austria)	Georg Harding	25	3+7		0+2		3+9		4	
27	(Montenegro)	Branko Boskovic	27	28+6	8	8		36+6	8	7	
Forwards
9	(Austria)	Stefan Maierhofer	24	6+5	7			6+5	7	5	
10	(Croatia)	Mario Bazina	31	30+4	9	8	3	38+4	12	1	
20	(Brazil)	Fabiano de Lima Campos Maria	21	3+14		1+2	1	4+16	1	2	
21	(Austria)	Erwin Hoffer	20	16+13	10	0+2		16+15	10	2	
Players who left after the start of the season
9	(Croatia)	Mate Bilic	26	11+8	5	7+1	2	18+9	7	6	

=== Goal scorers ===
Rank	Name	Bundesliga	UEFA Cup	Total
1	(Germany) Steffen Hofmann	10	8	18
2	(Croatia) Mario Bazina	9	3	12
3	(Austria) Erwin Hoffer	10		10
4	(Montenegro) Branko Boskovic	8		8
5	(Croatia) Mate Bilic	5	2	7
5	(Austria) Stefan Maierhofer	7		7
7	(Austria) Andreas Dober	4		4
8	(Austria) Markus Katzer	3		3
8	(Austria) Veli Kavlak	2	1	3
10	(Austria) Hannes Eder	2		2
10	(Austria) Martin Hiden	2		2
10	(Austria) Ümit Korkmaz	2		2
10	(Austria) Jürgen Patocka	2		2
14	(Brazil) Fabiano		1	1
14	(Finland) Markus Heikkinen	1		1
14	(Austria) Stefan Kulovits	1		1
14	(Croatia) Mario Tokic	1		1
Totals		69	15	84

== Fixtures and results ==
Win Draw Loss

=== Bundesliga ===
Rd	Date	Venue	Opponent	Res.	Att.	Goals and discipline
1	11.07.2007	H	Wacker Innsbruck	3–1	14,400	Patocka 31', Boskovic 87', Hofmann S. 90+4'; Eder H. (red card) 67'
2	25.07.2007	A	Mattersburg	2–3	15,500	Bilic 4', Katzer 44'
3	01.08.2007	A	Altach	1–0	7,100	Bazina 61' (pen.)
4	08.08.2007	H	Austria Kärnten	4–0	14,200	Bazina 4', Katzer 32', Bilic 50', Boskovic 90+1'
5	05.08.2007	H	Austria Wien	0–0	15,600	
6	12.08.2007	A	LASK	0–2	15,500	
7	19.08.2007	H	RB Salzburg	1–0	17,500	Katzer 78'
8	25.08.2007	A	Ried	3–0	7,200	Boskovic 26', Hofmann S. 76', Bilic 90+4'
9	02.09.2007	A	Sturm Graz	0–1	12,280	
10	15.09.2007	H	Sturm Graz	1–5	16,700	Bazina 72'
11	23.09.2007	A	Wacker Innsbruck	1–1	7,600	Hiden Mart. 77'
12	26.09.2007	H	Mattersburg	1–0	12,000	Bilic 2'
13	29.09.2007	H	Altach	0–2	11,800	
14	07.10.2007	A	Austria Kärnten	2–1	20,800	Kavlak 61', Bazina 71'
15	21.10.2007	A	Austria Wien	2–2	10,800	Kulovits 8', Bilic 70'
16	26.10.2007	H	LASK	4–4	14,900	Hiden Mart. 38', Dober 57', Kavlak 69', Patocka 83'
17	30.10.2007	A	RB Salzburg	1–2	13,500	Boskovic 86'
18	03.11.2007	H	Ried	4–0	13,300	Bazina 28', Hofmann S. 67' (pen.), Dober 70', Hoffer 78'
19	10.11.2007	H	Mattersburg	3–1	13,100	Dober 29', Bazina 49', Hofmann S. 81' (pen.)
20	25.11.2007	A	Austria Wien	0–0	11,000	
21	01.12.2007	H	RB Salzburg	1–3	14,900	Tokic 29'
22	08.12.2007	A	Wacker Innsbruck	1–1	11,000	Heikkinen 77'
23	16.12.2007	H	LASK	2–0	14,200	Bazina 66', Hofmann S. 90+4'
24	16.02.2008	A	Austria Kärnten	2–0	13,800	Hoffer 80' 84'
25	24.02.2008	A	Altach	1–2	8,000	Boskovic 69'
26	27.02.2008	H	Ried	4–0	13,600	Hoffer 4', Boskovic 58', Dober 63', Eder H. 75'
27	02.03.2008	A	Sturm Graz	2–0	15,322	Maierhofer 67', Bazina 86'
28	07.03.2008	H	Sturm Graz	2–1	17,500	Bazina 35', Hofmann S. 82' (pen.)
29	14.03.2008	A	Mattersburg	0–1	9,500	Thonhofer (yellow card) 72' (red card)
30	18.03.2008	H	Austria Wien	2–0	16,800	Maierhofer 66' 82'
31	23.03.2008	A	RB Salzburg	7–0	20,600	Hoffer 7' 30' 46', Maierhofer 9' 17', Korkmaz 12', Hofmann S. 90+1'
32	29.03.2008	H	Wacker Innsbruck	4–1	17,500	Maierhofer 20', Hofmann S. 43' (pen.), Eder H. 45', Boskovic 61'
33	06.04.2008	A	LASK	2–1	18,200	Hofmann S. 53' (pen.), Korkmaz 67'
34	11.04.2008	H	Austria Kärnten	2–1	17,500	Hofmann S. 27', Hoffer 86'
35	20.04.2008	H	Altach	3–0	18,400	Boskovic 7', Maierhofer 10', Hoffer 31'
36	26.04.2008	A	Ried	1–0	7,600	Hoffer 31'

==== League table ====
Pos	Team	Pld	W	D	L	GF	GA	GD	Pts	Qualification or relegation
1	Rapid Wien (C)	36	21	6	9	69	36	+33	69	Qualification to Champions League second qualifying round
2	Red Bull Salzburg	36	18	9	9	63	42	+21	63	Qualification to UEFA Cup first qualifying round (Note: According to the UEFA coefficients, only the 2nd place team would qualify for the UEFA Cup Qualification. This season, however, the UEFA Cup Qualification spot that would usually be awarded to the Austrian Cup winner will be given to the 3rd place team of the Bundesliga.)
3	Austria Wien	36	15	13	8	46	33	+13	58	Qualification to UEFA Cup first qualifying round
4	Sturm Graz	36	15	11	10	60	41	+19	56	Qualification to Intertoto Cup second round
5	Mattersburg	36	13	14	9	55	43	+12	53	

Source: weltfussball.de (in German)
Rules for classification: 1) points; 2) goal difference; 3) number of goals scored.
(C) Champions

=== Intertoto Cup ===
Rd	Date	Venue	Opponent	Res.	Att.	Goals and discipline
R2-L1	07.07.2007	H	Slovan Bratislava (Slovakia)	3–1	12,600	Hofmann S. 31' 53', Bazina 38'
R2-L2	14.07.2007	A	Slovan Bratislava (Slovakia)	0–1	6,000	Kulovits (yellow card) 75' (red card)
R3-L1	21.07.2007	H	Rubin Kazan (Russia)	3–1	10,200	Hofmann S. 70' 90+3', Bilic 80' (pen.)
R3-L2	29.07.2007	A	Rubin Kazan (Russia)	0–0	15,000	

=== UEFA Cup ===
Rd	Date	Venue	Opponent	Res.	Att.	Goals and discipline
Q2-L1	16.08.2007	A	Dinamo Tbilisi (Georgia (country))	3–0	4,000	Fabiano 21', Hofmann S. 39', Bazina 54'
Q2-L2	30.08.2007	H	Dinamo Tbilisi (Georgia (country))	5–0	12,600	Bazina 30', Bilic 54', Hofmann S. 60' 76' (pen.), Kavlak 73'
R1-L1	20.09.2007	A	Anderlecht (Belgium)	1–1	15,500	Hofmann S. 82'
R1-L2	04.10.2007	H	Anderlecht (Belgium)	0–1	17,500	
