= 2008–09 SK Rapid Wien season =

Rapid Wien
2008–09 season
- President: Rudolf Edlinger
- Coach: Peter Pacult
- Stadium: Gerhard Hanappi Stadium, Vienna, Austria
- Bundesliga: 2nd
- ÖFB-Cup: 3rd round
- Champions League: 2nd qualifying round
- Top goalscorer: League: Erwin Hoffer (27); All: Erwin Hoffer (29)
- Highest home attendance: 18,000
- Lowest home attendance: 16,200

The 2008–09 SK Rapid Wien season was the 111th season in club history.

== Squad statistics ==
No.	Nat.	Name	Age	League		Cup		Champions League		Total		Discipline	
No.	Nat.	Name	Age	Apps	Goals	Apps	Goals	Apps	Goals	Apps	Goals	Booked	Sent off (straight red)
Goalkeepers
1	(Austria)	Raimund Hedl	33	7+1		2				9+1			
24	(Austria)	Helge Payer	28	13						13			
25	(Germany)	Georg Koch	36	7				2		9		2	
30	(Austria)	Andreas Lukse	20	9		1				10			
Defenders
2	(Croatia)	Mario Tokic	32	21		2		2		25		5	
3	(Austria)	Jürgen Patocka	30	30+2	1	2		2		34+2	1	12	
6	(Austria)	Christian Thonhofer	23	12+5				0+1		12+6		1	1
14	(Austria)	Markus Katzer	28	17+2	1	3		2		22+2	1	7	
18	(Austria)	Hannes Eder	24	20+3	2	1				21+3	2	4	
23	(Austria)	Andreas Dober	22	31+2	1	3	1	2		36+2	2	9	
31	(Austria)	Tanju Kayhan	18	1+2						1+2			
32	(Austria)	Stephan Palla	19	2						2		1	
33	(Germany)	Marcel Ketelaer	30	7+5		0+1		0+1		7+7		1	
Midfielders
7	(Austria)	Stefan Kulovits	25	13+4		2+1		1		16+5		3	1
8	(Finland)	Markus Heikkinen	29	32		2		2		36		9	
11	(Germany)	Steffen Hofmann	27	33+1	12	3	1	2		38+1	13	5	
15	(Austria)	Boris Prokopic	20	1+1						1+1			
17	(Austria)	Veli Kavlak	19	20+9	4	3	1	2		25+9	5	6	
19	(Austria)	Christopher Drazan	17	5+14				0+1		5+15		4	1
22	(Austria)	Georg Harding	26	1+7		0+1				1+8		1	
27	(Montenegro)	Branko Boskovic	28	28+1	6	3	4	1		32+1	10	8	
28	(Austria)	Christopher Trimmel	21	1+4						1+4			
35	(Austria)	Yasin Pehlivan	19	14	2					14	2	4	
Forwards
9	(Austria)	Stefan Maierhofer	25	33+2	23	3	2	2	2	38+2	27	9	
16	(Croatia)	Nikica Jelavic	22	9+25	7	1+2	1	0+2		10+29	8		
20	(Austria)	René Gartler	22	1+2						1+2			
21	(Austria)	Erwin Hoffer	21	28+6	27	1+2	1	2	1	31+8	29	4	
Players who left after the start of the season
4	(Austria)	Martin Hiden	35	0+4		1+1				1+5		1	

=== Goal scorers ===
Rank	Name	Bundesliga	Cup	Champions League	Total
1	(Austria) Erwin Hoffer	27	1	1	29
2	(Austria) Stefan Maierhofer	23	2	2	27
3	(Germany) Steffen Hofmann	12	1		13
4	(Montenegro) Branko Boskovic	6	4		10
5	(Croatia) Nikica Jelavic	7	1		8
6	(Austria) Veli Kavlak	4	1		5
7	(Austria) Andreas Dober	1	1		2
7	(Austria) Hannes Eder	2			2
7	(Austria) Yasin Pehlivan	2			2
10	(Austria) Markus Katzer	1			1
10	(Austria) Jürgen Patocka	1			1
OG	(Austria) Michael Baur (LASK)	1			1
OG	(Austria) Thomas Burgstaller (Ried)	1			1
OG	(Hungary) Oliver Pusztai (Kärnten)	1			1
Totals		89	11	3	103

== Fixtures and results ==
Win Draw Loss

=== Bundesliga ===
Rd	Date	Venue	Opponent	Res.	Att.	Goals and discipline
1	08.07.2008	A	Sturm Graz	1–3	15,322	Dober 50'
2	12.07.2008	H	RB Salzburg	2–2	17,000	Hofmann S. 17' (pen.), Maierhofer 31'
3	19.07.2008	H	Austria Kärnten	1–0	15,400	Hoffer 90+4'
4	26.07.2008	A	Mattersburg	1–0	11,200	Maierhofer 4'
5	02.08.2008	H	Kapfenberg	3–1	16,400	Hofmann S. 15', Kavlak 69', Maierhofer 71'
6	09.08.2008	A	Altach	7–2	7,500	Hoffer 8' 20' 30' 31', Maierhofer 36' 63', Hofmann S. 45'
7	24.08.2008	H	Austria Wien	3–0	18,000	Boskovic 6' 57', Hofmann S. 81'
8	30.08.2008	A	LASK	5–2	13,100	Hoffer 25' 50', Maierhofer 42', Baur 48' (o.g.), Katzer 80'
9	19.09.2008	H	Ried	1–1	17,500	Burgstaller 77' (o.g.)
10	23.09.2008	A	Ried	0–1	6,200	
11	28.09.2008	H	Sturm Graz	2–1	17,500	Hofmann S. 37' (pen.), Maierhofer 81'
12	05.10.2008	A	RB Salzburg	0–1	23,800	
13	04.11.2008	A	Austria Kärnten	3–3	14,300	Jelavic 32', Maierhofer 40', Hofmann S. 68'
14	25.10.2008	H	Mattersburg	1–0	17,500	Maierhofer 59'
15	31.10.2008	A	Kapfenberg	2–0	9,113	Maierhofer 49', Kavlak 90+4'
16	08.11.2008	H	Altach	5–1	16,900	Jelavic 8' 15' 66', Maierhofer 54' 82'
17	11.11.2008	A	Austria Wien	0–2	12,200	
18	15.11.2008	H	LASK	5–0	17,000	Hofmann S. 37' (pen.), Maierhofer 54' 58' 75', Hoffer 90+7'
19	23.11.2008	A	Sturm Graz	2–2	15,327	Hoffer 76' 88'
20	29.11.2008	H	Altach	8–1	15,000	Maierhofer 11' 25' 55', Hoffer 32' 49' 87', Jelavic 85' 89'
21	07.12.2008	A	Austria Wien	2–2	12,300	Hofmann S. 40', Hoffer 52'
22	14.12.2008	H	LASK	1–1	16,800	Maierhofer 52'
23	22.02.2009	A	RB Salzburg	1–2	17,800	Boskovic 34'
24	28.02.2009	H	Ried	1–0	16,200	Hofmann S. 5'; Thonhofer (yellow card) 81' (red card) , Drazan (yellow card) 89' (red card)
25	08.03.2009	A	Mattersburg	3–0	8,600	Boskovic 21' 42', Hoffer 52'
26	14.03.2009	H	Kapfenberg	6–0	16,500	Maierhofer 11', Pehlivan 18', Hoffer 35' 63', Eder H. 84', Kavlak 89'
27	21.03.2009	A	Austria Kärnten	3–1	16,700	Hoffer 14' 45', Maierhofer 53'
28	05.04.2009	H	Austria Kärnten	4–2	17,500	Hofmann S. 11' 19' (pen.), Kavlak 25', Pusztai 70' (o.g.)
29	12.04.2009	H	Sturm Graz	0–1	17,500	
30	18.04.2009	A	Altach	1–1	8,100	Maierhofer 36'
31	26.04.2009	H	Austria Wien	3–2	17,500	Hoffer 36', Hofmann S. 53' (pen.), Patocka 62'
32	02.05.2009	A	LASK	2–0	15,000	Hoffer 13', Boskovic 50'
33	10.05.2009	H	RB Salzburg	4–2	17,800	Maierhofer 22', Hoffer 53' 62' 75'
34	17.05.2009	A	Ried	0–3	7,600	Kulovits (yellow card) 56' (red card)
35	21.05.2009	H	Mattersburg	2–3	17,000	Jelavic 50', Eder H. 77'
36	31.05.2009	A	Kapfenberg	4–0	7,300	Hoffer 2' 54' 62', Pehlivan 66'

==== League table ====
Pos	Team	Pld	W	D	L	GF	GA	GD	Pts	Qualification or relegation
1	Red Bull Salzburg (C)	36	23	5	8	86	50	+36	74	Qualification to Champions League second qualifying round
2	Rapid Wien	36	21	7	8	89	43	+46	70	Qualification to Europa League second qualifying round
3	Austria Wien	36	17	11	8	59	46	+13	62	Qualification to Europa League third qualifying round (Note: Austria Vienna won the 2008–09 Austrian Cup and therefore qualified for the third qualifying round of the UEFA Europa League.)
4	Sturm Graz	36	17	9	10	68	45	+23	60	Qualification to Europa League second qualifying round
5	Ried	36	17	9	10	58	38	+20	60	

Source: weltfussball.de (in German)
Rules for classification: 1) points; 2) goal difference; 3) number of goals scored.
(C) Champions

=== Cup ===
Rd	Date	Venue	Opponent	Res.	Att.	Goals and discipline
R1	15.08.2008	A	Austria Klagenfurt	5–0	1,000	Boskovic 43' 59' 90', Kavlak 55', Jelavic 69'
R2	13.09.2008	A	Leoben	4–1 (a.e.t.)	4,500	Boskovic 48', Maierhofer 95' 105', Hoffer 100'
R16	28.10.2008	A	Ried	2–3	3,000	Hofmann S. 34', Dober 54'

=== Champions League qualification ===
Rd	Date	Venue	Opponent	Res.	Att.	Goals and discipline
Q2-L1	30.07.2008	A	Anorthosis (Cyprus)	0–3	9,300	
Q2-L2	06.08.2008	H	Anorthosis (Cyprus)	3–1	17,000	Hoffer 22', Maierhofer 63' 67'
