= 2010–11 SK Rapid Wien season =

Rapid Wien
2010–11 season
- President: Rudolf Edlinger
- Coach: Peter Pacult / Zoran Barisic
- Stadium: Gerhard Hanappi Stadium, Vienna, Austria
- Bundesliga: 5th
- ÖFB-Cup: Semi-finals
- Europa League: Group stage (3rd)
- Top goalscorer: League: Hamdi Salihi (18); All: Hamdi Salihi (25)
- Highest home attendance: 17,500
- Lowest home attendance: 12,400

The 2010–11 SK Rapid Wien season was the 113th season in club history.

== Squad statistics ==
No.	Nat.	Name	Age	League		Cup		Europa League		Total		Discipline	
No.	Nat.	Name	Age	Apps	Goals	Apps	Goals	Apps	Goals	Apps	Goals	Booked	Sent off (straight red)
Goalkeepers
1	(Austria)	Raimund Hedl	35	21				11		32		1	
24	(Austria)	Helge Payer	30	15		4		1		20		1	
30	(Austria)	Lukas Königshofer	21			1				1			
Defenders
3	(Austria)	Jürgen Patocka	32	12+4	2	2		6+3		20+7	2	5	
6	(Austria)	Mario Sonnleitner	23	30	3	3		11	1	44	4	5	1
14	(Austria)	Markus Katzer	30	31+1	1	4	1	9	1	44+1	3	10	
22	(Norway)	Ragnvald Soma	30	32	1	4		8		44	1	5	
23	(Austria)	Andreas Dober	24	3+6		3		3+4		9+10		3	
25	(Austria)	Tanju Kayhan	20	30		3+1		10		43+1		10	1
36	(Austria)	Michael Schimpelsberger	19	4+2						4+2			
Midfielders
7	(Austria)	Stefan Kulovits	27	15+2	1	4+1		5+1		24+4	1	5	1
8	(Finland)	Markus Heikkinen	31	30	2			9		39	2	9	
11	(Germany)	Steffen Hofmann	29	23+2	5	4		8	3	35+2	8	7	
16	(Austria)	Boris Prokopic	22	11+1	1	1				12+1	1	3	1
17	(Austria)	Veli Kavlak	21	20+1		2+1		9+1	1	31+3	1	8	1
19	(Austria)	Christopher Drazan	19	16+7	1	1+1		4+4		21+12	1	8	1
21	(Austria)	Christoph Saurer	24	13+9	2	3+2	1	6+2		22+13	3	2	
26	(Austria)	Thomas Hinum	22	6+5		2+1		3+2		11+8		1	
28	(Austria)	Christopher Trimmel	23	5+23	1	2+2		5+5	2	12+30	3		
35	(Austria)	Yasin Pehlivan	21	19+1	1	3+1		6		28+2	1	9	
Forwards
9	(Albania)	Hamdi Salihi	26	26+6	18	4+1	6	4+3	1	34+10	25	4	
10	(Netherlands)	Jan Vennegoor of Hesselink	31	9+1	2	1	1	1+1	1	11+2	4	5	
15	(Austria)	Atdhe Nuhiu	20	10+18	5	0+2	1	5+3	2	15+23	8	2	
20	(Austria)	René Gartler	24	10+6	4	3	2	3+5	3	16+11	9		
27	(Austria)	Vasil Kuleski	17	0+2						0+2			
33	(Austria)	Mario Konrad	27										
Players who left after the start of the season
16	(Croatia)	Nikica Jelavic	24	4	2			4	4	8	6	2	
18	(Austria)	Hannes Eder	26	1+2		1		1		3+2		1	

=== Goal scorers ===
Rank	Name	Bundesliga	Cup	Europa League	Total
1	(Albania) Hamdi Salihi	18	6	1	25
2	(Austria) Rene Gartler	4	2	3	9
3	(Germany) Steffen Hofmann	5		3	8
3	(Austria) Atdhe Nuhiu	5	1	2	8
5	(Croatia) Nikica Jelavic	2		4	6
6	(Austria) Mario Sonnleitner	3		1	4
6	(Netherlands) Jan Vennegoor of Hesselink	2	1	1	4
8	(Austria) Markus Katzer	1	1	1	3
8	(Austria) Christoph Saurer	2	1		3
8	(Austria) Christopher Trimmel	1		2	3
11	(Finland) Markus Heikkinen	2			2
11	(Austria) Jürgen Patocka	2			2
13	(Austria) Christopher Drazan	1			1
13	(Austria) Veli Kavlak			1	1
13	(Austria) Stefan Kulovits	1			1
13	(Austria) Yasin Pehlivan	1			1
13	(Austria) Boris Prokopic	1			1
13	(Norway) Ragnvald Soma	1			1
Totals		52	12	19	83

== Fixtures and results ==
Win Draw Loss

=== Bundesliga ===
Rd	Date	Venue	Opponent	Res.	Att.	Goals and discipline
1	18.07.2010	A	Wacker Innsbruck	0–4	13,600	
2	25.07.2010	H	Wiener Neustadt	1–2	15,500	Jelavic 73'
3	01.08.2010	H	RB Salzburg	2–1	17,500	Saurer 49', Hofmann S. 90+3'
4	08.08.2010	A	Sturm Graz	2–0	15,300	Patocka 29', Jelavic 81'; Sonnleitner (red card) 72'
5	22.08.2010	H	Mattersburg	2–0	16,700	Sonnleitner 13', Salihi 90+1'
6	29.08.2010	A	LASK	0–1	9,800	
7	12.09.2010	H	Austria Wien	0–1	17,500	
8	22.09.2010	A	Ried	1–3	7,600	Vennegoor of Hesselink 13'
9	25.09.2010	H	Kapfenberg	3–2	15,000	Salihi 19' 61', Vennegoor of Hesselink 90+3'
10	03.10.2010	A	Kapfenberg	0–0	6,500	
11	16.10.2010	H	Wacker Innsbruck	1–1	17,500	Hofmann S. 59'; Kavlak (yellow card) 29' (red card)
12	24.10.2010	A	Wiener Neustadt	1–1	7,100	Katzer 22'; Kayhan (yellow card) 51' (red card)
13	31.10.2010	A	RB Salzburg	1–1	20,100	Heikkinen 87'
14	07.11.2010	H	Sturm Graz	3–1	17,500	Sonnleitner 3', Gartler R. 60' 83'
15	13.11.2010	A	Mattersburg	2–2	10,700	Pehlivan 47', Nuhiu 90+3'
16	20.11.2010	H	LASK	5–0	15,200	Salihi 11' 45' 87' 89', Gartler R. 78'
17	28.11.2010	A	Austria Wien	1–0	13,100	Salihi 51'
18	05.12.2010	H	Ried	3–0	14,800	Patocka 38', Sonnleitner 53', Nuhiu 59'
19	11.12.2010	H	Wacker Innsbruck	3–3	14,300	Salihi 17' 65', Gartler R. 50'
20	12.02.2011	A	Wiener Neustadt	0–2	5,500	
21	20.02.2011	A	RB Salzburg	1–1	15,800	Soma 71'; Drazan (red card) 47', Prokopic (yellow card) 70' (red card)
22	26.02.2011	H	Kapfenberg	2–0	14,400	Nuhiu 52', Trimmel 68'
23	01.03.2011	A	Mattersburg	0–1	5,200	
24	06.03.2011	H	Ried	2–0	14,600	Salihi 15' 46'
25	13.03.2011	A	Austria Wien	1–0	13,100	Salihi 72'
26	19.03.2011	H	LASK	0–0	16,200	
27	02.04.2011	A	Sturm Graz	3–3	15,323	Prokopic 12', Salihi 34' (pen.), Hofmann S. 55'
28	09.04.2011	H	Sturm Graz	0–2	17,500	
29	16.04.2011	A	Wacker Innsbruck	3–0	13,700	Salihi 10' (pen.), Drazan 63', Hofmann S. 70'
30	23.04.2011	H	Wiener Neustadt	4–1	15,600	Salihi 31' 68' (pen.), Hofmann S. 82', Saurer 90+2'
31	01.05.2011	H	RB Salzburg	1–2	17,500	Nuhiu 84'
32	07.05.2011	A	Kapfenberg	1–1	4,500	Kulovits 10'; Kulovits (red card) 78'
33	11.05.2011	H	Mattersburg	0–0	12,400	
34	14.05.2011	A	Ried	1–2	6,200	Nuhiu 74'
35	22.05.2011	H	Austria Wien	0–3	17,500	
36	25.05.2011	A	LASK	2–1	5,900	Heikkinen 35', Salihi 48'

==== League table ====
Pos	Team	Pld	W	D	L	GF	GA	GD	Pts	Qualification or relegation
3	Austria Wien	36	17	10	9	65	37	+28	61	Qualification to Europa League second qualifying round
4	Ried	36	16	10	10	51	38	+13	58	Qualification to Europa League third qualifying round (Note: As winners of the 2010–11 Austrian Cup.)
5	Rapid Wien	36	14	11	11	52	42	+10	53 (Note: According to the competition rules of the Austrian FA, Rapid will always be ranked below any club with equal points due to the forced suspension of a match by the club.)	
6	Wacker Innsbruck	36	13	11	12	43	42	+1	50	
7	Wiener Neustadt	36	14	8	14	44	52	−8	50	

Source: weltfussball.de (in German)
Rules for classification: 1) points; 2) goal difference; 3) number of goals scored.

=== Cup ===
Rd	Date	Venue	Opponent	Res.	Att.	Goals and discipline
R1	14.08.2010	A	Rapid II	5–2	4,100	Gartler R. 16', Salihi 22' 50' 51', Saurer 85'
R2	19.09.2010	A	Austria Wien II	1–1 (4–3 p)	3,200	Gartler R. 10'
R16	10.11.2010	H	Hartberg	3–0	6,800	Salihi 47' (pen.) 69', Nuhiu 84'
QF	20.04.2011	H	Mattersburg	2–0	11,200	Vennegoor of Hesselink 10', Katzer 69'
SF	04.05.2011	A	Ried	1–2	5,000	Salihi 36'

=== Europa League ===
==== Qualification ====
Rd	Date	Venue	Opponent	Res.	Att.	Goals and discipline
Q2-L1	15.07.2010	A	Suduva (Lithuania)	2–0	4,000	Hofmann S. 12', Trimmel 81'
Q2-L2	22.07.2010	H	Suduva (Lithuania)	4–2	11,800	Jelavic 20' 90', Gartler R. 86' 89'
Q3-L1	29.07.2010	A	Beroe (Bulgaria)	1–1	5,000	Hofmann S. 45+1' (pen.)
Q3-L2	03.08.2010	H	Beroe (Bulgaria)	3–0	11,700	Jelavic 5' 60', Katzer 71'
PO-L1	19.08.2010	H	Aston Villa (England)	1–1	17,500	Nuhiu 32'
PO-L2	26.08.2010	A	Aston Villa (England)	3–2	30,000	Nuhiu 52', Sonnleitner 78', Gartler R. 81'

==== Group stage ====
Rd	Date	Venue	Opponent	Res.	Att.	Goals and discipline
G1	16.09.2010	A	Porto (Portugal)	0–3	30,004	
G2	30.09.2010	H	Besiktas (Turkey)	1–2	50,000	Kavlak 51'
G3	21.10.2010	A	CSKA Sofia (Bulgaria)	2–0	12,000	Vennegoor of Hesselink 28', Hofmann S. 32'
G4	04.11.2010	H	CSKA Sofia (Bulgaria)	1–2	50,000	Salihi 56' (pen.)
G5	02.12.2010	H	Porto (Portugal)	1–3	47,600	Trimmel 39'
G6	15.12.2010	A	Besiktas (Turkey)	0–2	20,000	

Pos	Team	Pld	W	D	L	GF	GA	GD	Pts	Qualification	POR	BJK	RPD	CSS
1	(Portugal) Porto	6	5	1	0	14	4	+10	16	Advance to knockout phase	—	1–1	3–0	3–1
2	(Turkey) Beşiktaş	6	4	1	1	9	6	+3	13	Advance to knockout phase	1–3	—	2–0	1–0
3	(Austria) Rapid Wien	6	1	0	5	5	12	−7	3		1–3	1–2	—	1–2
4	(Bulgaria) CSKA Sofia	6	1	0	5	4	10	−6	3		0–1	1–2	0–2	—

Source: Soccerway
