= Veli Kavlak =

Austrian footballer

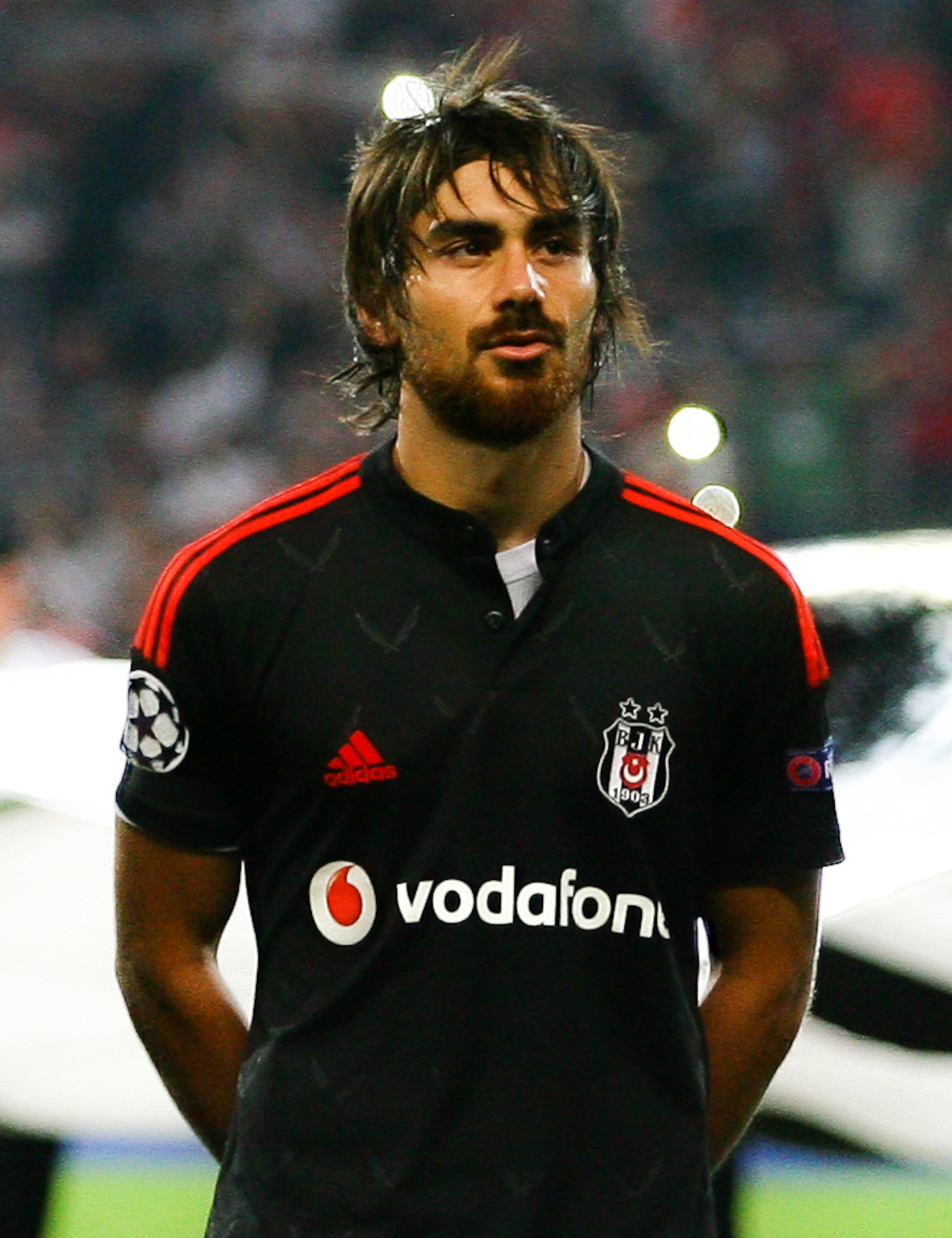
- Kavlak with Beşiktaş in 2014

Personal information
- Full name: Veli Kavlak
- Date of birth: 3 November 1988 (age 38)
- Place of birth: Vienna, Austria
- Height: 1.79 m (5 ft 10 in)
- Position: Midfielder

Youth career
- SK Slovan HAC
- 2003–2004: Rapid Wien

Senior career*
Years	Team	Apps	(Gls)
2004–2011	Rapid Wien	146	(13)
2011–2018	Beşiktaş	115	(6)
Total		261	(19)

International career
2005–2006	Austria U19	4	(0)
2006–2007	Austria U20	7	(0)
2007–2010	Austria U21	18	(1)
2007–2014	Austria	31	(1)
- * Club domestic league appearances and goals

Veli Kavlak (born 3 November 1988) is an Austrian former professional footballer who played as a midfielder for Rapid Wien and Turkish club Beşiktaş. He made 31 appearances for the Austria at international level scoring one goal.

== International career ==
On 15 August 2012 he scored against his parents' home country Turkey playing for Austria in the 3rd minute. Austria went on to win that game 2–0.

== Style of play ==
Kavlak is a defensive box-to-box midfielder. At club level, he is deployed in the holding role and is key in midfield with his tireless running and endless stamina. He is also a hardworking leader and although not being known for unsportsmanlike acts, he is known to be a hatchet man in midfield. Kavlak is often accompanied by another more offensive central midfielder such as Manuel Fernandes and Oğuzhan Özyakup. At international level, however, he has most prominently featured in a more advanced position in front of a holding midfielder.

== Personal life ==
Veli Kavlak was born to Turkish parents. He also holds Turkish citizenship. He speaks Turkish fluently.

== Career statistics ==
=== Club ===
Appearances and goals by club, season and competition
Club	Season	League			National cup		Continental		Total	
Club	Season	Division	Apps	Goals	Apps	Goals	Apps	Goals	Apps	Goals
Rapid Wien	2004–05	Austrian Bundesliga	2	0	0	0	–		2	0
Rapid Wien	2005–06	Austrian Bundesliga	14	2	2	0	1	0	17	2
Rapid Wien	2006–07	Austrian Bundesliga	29	3	1	0	–		30	3
Rapid Wien	2007–08	Austrian Bundesliga	27	2	4	1	–		31	3
Rapid Wien	2008–09	Austrian Bundesliga	29	4	3	1	2	0	34	5
Rapid Wien	2009–10	Austrian Bundesliga	24	2	2	0	7	0	33	2
Rapid Wien	2010–11	Austrian Bundesliga	21	0	3	0	10	1	34	1
Rapid Wien	Total		146	13	15	2	20	1	181	16
Beşiktaş	2011–12	Super Lig	33	1	1	1	11	0	45	2
Beşiktaş	2012–13	Super Lig	30	1	3	0	0	0	33	1
Beşiktaş	2013–14	Super Lig	29	3	0	0	2	0	31	3
Beşiktaş	2014–15	Super Lig	22	1	1	0	12	0	35	2
Beşiktaş	2015–16	Super Lig	1	0	5	0	0	0	6	0
Beşiktaş	2016–17	Super Lig	0	0	2	0	0	0	2	0
Beşiktaş	2017–18	Super Lig	0	0	0	0	0	0	0	0
Beşiktaş	Total		115	6	12	1	25	0	152	7
Career total			261	19	27	3	45	1	333	23

=== International ===
Appearances and goals by national team and year
National team	Year	Apps	Goals
Austria	2007	3	0
Austria	2008	1	0
Austria	2009	3	0
Austria	2010	5	0
Austria	2011	3	0
Austria	2012	7	1
Austria	2013	7	0
Austria	2014	2	0
Total		31	1

Scores and results list Austria's goal tally first, score column indicates score after each Kavlak goal.

List of international goals scored by Veli Kavlak
No.	Date	Venue	Opponent	Score	Result	Competition
1	15 August 2012	Ernst Happel Stadium, Vienna, Austria	Turkey	1–0	2–0	Friendly

== Honours ==
Rapid Wien

- Austrian Bundesliga: 2004–05, 2007–08

Beşiktaş

- Süper Lig: 2015–16, 2016–17
