= Steffen Hofmann =

German footballer (born 1980)

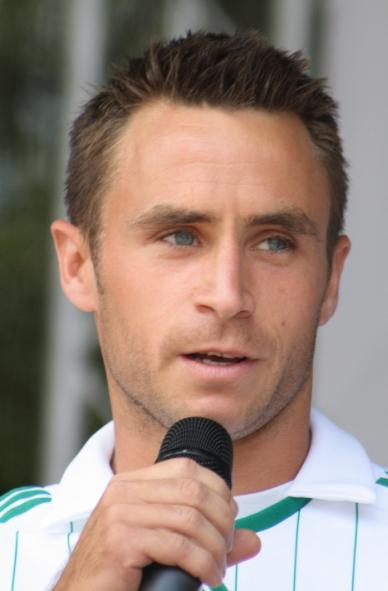
- Hofmann in 2008

Personal information
- Date of birth: 9 September 1980 (age 46)
- Place of birth: Würzburg, West Germany
- Height: 1.73 m (5 ft 8 in)
- Position: Midfielder

Team information
- Current team: SK Rapid Wien (sports coordinator)

Youth career
- 1985–1993: 1. FC Kirchheim
- 1993–1996: Würzburger FV
- 1996–2000: Bayern Munich

Senior career*
Years	Team	Apps	(Gls)
2000–2002	Bayern Munich II	57	(21)
2001–2002	Bayern Munich	1	(0)
2002–2005	Rapid Wien	109	(26)
2005–2006	1860 Munich	16	(2)
2006–2018	Rapid Wien	325	(72)
Total		508	(121)

International career
	Germany U16	6	(0)
	Germany U17	12	(1)
	Germany U18	3	(1)
2004	Germany B	3	(0)

Managerial career
- 2018–: Rapid Wien (coach/scout)
- 2020–2021: Rapid Wien II (caretaker)
- 2021: Rapid Wien (caretaker)
- * Club domestic league appearances and goals

Steffen Hofmann (born 9 September 1980) is a German football coach and a former player, who played most of his career for SK Rapid Wien of the Austrian Bundesliga. He played as an attacking midfielder. He works as a sports coordinator for Rapid Wien.

== Club career ==
In his early years, Hofmann played for the youth team of his home town Würzburg before joining the Bayern Munich Junior Team in 1997. After leading the team to a championship and a runner-up finish in the German Youth Leagues, he was promoted to the second team of Bayern Munich in 2000. After scoring 12 goals in 36 games for the second team, he got a chance to play for Bayern Munich's first team on 27 October 2001 in their game against 1. FC Köln, coming on as a substitute for Claudio Pizarro in the 90th minute. This was his only game for the first team.

In 2002, Hofmann joined the Austrian team SK Rapid Wien and quickly became a fan favourite. He also formed the league's best midfield duo along with Andreas Ivanschitz and the two led the team to its 31st league championship in 2005 and to the group stage of the UEFA Champions League in 2006. After finishing last in their group and the transfer of his teammate Ivanschitz, Hofmann decided to join the German club TSV 1860 Munich in January 2006, but after desperately trying to find his form there, he returned to Rapid Wien in the summer.

Following his return Hofmann got injured in the first game of the season and therefore missed half the season. His comeback came in late October and he has since then been one of the key players and the captain of Rapid Wien. He is also called "football god" by the fans because of his technical skills, his commitment and his endurance (he did not miss a minute of the 2008 season). Hofmann is also known as a player who rather passes the ball to a better positioned player than having a shoot at goal.

On 21 October 2010, he netted the second goal to help his side to a 2–0 away win against Bulgarian club CSKA Sofia in a UEFA Europa League match.

Hoffman retired during 2018, and a testimonial match was played in his honour between SK Rapid and a "Steffen Hofmann & Friends" XI.

== International career ==
The Austrian Football Association tried in 2005 to let Hofmann, who was born in Germany but is married to an Austrian, to play for the Austria national football team. Hofmann agreed, but the transfer of rights was refused by FIFA as Hofmann had played several games for Germany in his youth. After the episode, Hofmann did not attain Austrian citizenship and was chosen to represent Germany during the team's Asian tour in late 2005. However, due to illness he could not take part and has not been nominated since despite declaring interest.

== Trivia ==
Hofmann was never sent off in his entire professional career.

== Career statistics ==
Appearances and goals by club, season and competition
Club	Season	League			Cup		Continental		Total		Ref.
Club	Season	League	Apps	Goals	Apps	Goals	Apps	Goals	Apps	Goals	Ref.
Bayern Munich II	2000–01	Regionalliga Süd	26	7	—		—		26	7	
Bayern Munich II	2001–02	Regionalliga Süd	31	14	—		—		31	14	
Bayern Munich II	Total		57	21	0	0	0	0	57	21	—
Bayern Munich	2001–02	Bundesliga	1	0	0	0	0	0	1	0	
Rapid Wien	2002–03	Austrian Bundesliga	30	5	1	0	—		31	5	
Rapid Wien	2003–04	Austrian Bundesliga	27	10	2	0	—		29	10	
Rapid Wien	2004–05	Austrian Bundesliga	32	8	3	2	4	2	39	12	
Rapid Wien	2005–06	Austrian Bundesliga	20	3	0	0	9	2	29	5	
Rapid Wien	Total		109	26	6	2	13	4	128	32	—
1860 Munich	2005–06	2. Bundesliga	16	2	1	0	—		17	2	
Rapid Wien	2006–07	Austrian Bundesliga	19	1	0	0	—		19	1	
Rapid Wien	2007–08	Austrian Bundesliga	36	10	—		8	8	44	18	
Rapid Wien	2008–09	Austrian Bundesliga	34	12	3	1	2	0	39	13	
Rapid Wien	2009–10	Austrian Bundesliga	36	20	3	0	12	5	51	25	
Rapid Wien	2010–11	Austrian Bundesliga	25	5	4	0	8	3	37	8	
Rapid Wien	2011–12	Austrian Bundesliga	32	6	2	0	—		34	6	
Rapid Wien	2012–13	Austrian Bundesliga	20	2	2	1	6	1	28	4	
Rapid Wien	2013–14	Austrian Bundesliga	32	5	0	0	9	0	41	5	
Rapid Wien	2014–15	Austrian Bundesliga	36	4	4	0	2	0	42	4	
Rapid Wien	2015–16	Austrian Bundesliga	29	4	2	0	11	4	42	8	
Rapid Wien	2016–17	Austrian Bundesliga	15	2	4	1	3	0	22	3	
Rapid Wien	2017–18	Austrian Bundesliga	11	1	2	0	—		13	0	
Rapid Wien	Total		325	72	26	3	61	21	412	96	—
Career total			508	121	32	5	74	25	615	151	—

== Honours ==
Bayern Munich

- German B-youth Championship: 1997

Rapid Wien

- Austrian Football Bundesliga: 2004–05, 2007–08
- Intertoto Cup: 2007

Individual

- Austrian Footballer of the Year: 2004, 2009
- Krone Footballer of the Year (voted by fans): 2006, 2007
- Austrian Football Bundesliga top scorer: 2009–10 (20 goals)
