= 2009–10 Austrian Football Bundesliga =

98th season of top-tier football league in Austria

Austrian Bundesliga
- Season: 2009–10
- Dates: 17 July 2009 – 13 May 2010
- Champions: RB Salzburg
- Relegated: Austria Kärnten
- Champions League: RB Salzburg
- Europa League: Austria Wien; Rapid Wien; Sturm Graz
- Matches: 180
- Goals: 528 (2.93 per match)
- Top goalscorer: Steffen Hofmann (20)
- Biggest home win: RB Salzburg 7–1 A. Kärnten
- Biggest away win: Mattersburg 1–6 RB Salzburg
- Highest scoring: Kapfenberger SV 7-2 LASK; LASK 4–5 A. Vienna

The 2009–10 Austrian Football Bundesliga was the 98th season of top-tier football in Austria. The competition is officially called tipp3-Bundesliga powered by T-Mobile, named after the Austrian betting company tipp3 and the Austrian branch of German mobile phone company T-Mobile. The season began on the weekend of 18 July 2009 and ended on 13 May 2010. RB Salzburg claimed the championship on the last matchday, their second consecutive title.

== Team changes from last season ==
SC Rheindorf Altach were relegated after finishing the 2008–09 season in 10th and last place. They were replaced by First League champions SC Wiener Neustadt.

== Overview ==
=== Stadia and locations ===
Location of teams in the Austrian Football Bundesliga 2009–10

| Team | City/Area | Venue | Capacity |
|---|---|---|---|
| Austria Kärnten | Klagenfurt | Hypo Group Arena | 32,000 |
| Austria Vienna | Vienna | Franz Horr Stadium | 13,000 |
| Kapfenberger SV | Kapfenberg | Franz-Fekete-Stadion | 12,000 |
| LASK | Linz | Linzer Stadion | 14,100 |
| SV Mattersburg | Mattersburg | Pappelstadion | 15,700 |
| Rapid Vienna | Vienna | Gerhard-Hanappi-Stadion | 18,442 |
| Red Bull Salzburg | Salzburg | Red Bull Arena | 30,188 |
| SV Ried | Ried im Innkreis | Fill Metallbau Stadion | 7,700 |
| Sturm Graz | Graz | UPC-Arena | 15,312 |
| SC Wiener Neustadt | Wiener Neustadt | Stadion Wiener Neustadt | 10,000 |

== League table ==
| Pos | Team | Pld | W | D | L | GF | GA | GD | Pts | Qualification or relegation |
|---|---|---|---|---|---|---|---|---|---|---|
| 1 | Red Bull Salzburg (C) | 36 | 22 | 10 | 4 | 68 | 27 | +41 | 76 | Qualification to Champions League second qualifying round |
| 2 | Austria Wien | 36 | 23 | 6 | 7 | 60 | 34 | +26 | 75 | Qualification to Europa League second qualifying round |
| 3 | Rapid Wien | 36 | 21 | 10 | 5 | 80 | 38 | +42 | 73 | Qualification to Europa League second qualifying round |
| 4 | Sturm Graz | 36 | 16 | 10 | 10 | 50 | 36 | +14 | 58 | Qualification to Europa League third qualifying round (Note: per 2009–10 Austrian Cup) |
| 5 | Wiener Neustadt | 36 | 13 | 8 | 15 | 54 | 58 | −4 | 47 | |
| 6 | Mattersburg | 36 | 12 | 5 | 19 | 45 | 71 | −26 | 41 | |
| 7 | LASK Linz | 36 | 9 | 13 | 14 | 59 | 70 | −11 | 40 | |
| 8 | Ried | 36 | 10 | 8 | 18 | 39 | 47 | −8 | 38 | |
| 9 | Kapfenberger SV | 36 | 8 | 9 | 19 | 44 | 67 | −23 | 33 | |
| 10 | Austria Kärnten (R) | 36 | 2 | 9 | 25 | 29 | 80 | −51 | 15 | Relegation to Austrian Regionalliga (Note: Austria Kärnten were not granted a professional license for the 2010–11 season and thus were demoted to the Regionalliga.) |

Source: weltfussball.de (in German)
Rules for classification: 1) points; 2) goal difference; 3) number of goals scored.
(C) Champions; (R) Relegated

== Results ==
Teams played each other four times in the league. In the first half of the season each team played every other team twice (home and away), and then did the same in the second half of the season.

=== First half of season ===
| Home \ Away | AKÄ | AWI | KAP | LIN | MAT | RWI | RIE | RBS | STU | WN |
|---|---|---|---|---|---|---|---|---|---|---|
| Austria Kärnten | | 2–1 | 1–1 | 1–1 | 0–3 | 1–3 | 0–0 | 1–2 | 1–3 | 0–0 |
| Austria Wien | 1–0 | | 3–0 | 3–0 | 1–0 | 1–1 | 1–1 | 1–0 | 1–0 | 2–1 |
| Kapfenberger SV | 3–2 | 1–0 | | 7–2 | 0–1 | 0–1 | 0–1 | 0–2 | 0–1 | 3–1 |
| LASK Linz | 3–1 | 4–5 | 4–0 | | 4–0 | 3–3 | 2–2 | 0–0 | 2–2 | 4–2 |
| Mattersburg | 4–1 | 1–3 | 4–1 | 3–2 | | 2–1 | 3–0 | 2–3 | 0–2 | 1–3 |
| Rapid Wien | 5–1 | 4–1 | 3–1 | 4–1 | 4–0 | | 1–0 | 2–2 | 2–1 | 3–1 |
| Ried | 1–0 | 0–2 | 3–0 | 5–2 | 0–0 | 1–1 | | 1–0 | 1–2 | 3–0 |
| Red Bull Salzburg | 7–1 | 2–1 | 4–0 | 3–2 | 2–0 | 0–0 | 1–1 | | 4–2 | 1–1 |
| Sturm Graz | 4–0 | 0–1 | 0–0 | 3–3 | 2–0 | 1–0 | 0–2 | 0–0 | | 3–0 |
| Wiener Neustadt | 3–1 | 4–3 | 2–3 | 4–1 | 3–0 | 0–4 | 2–1 | 1–1 | 0–0 | |

Source: weltfussball.de (in German)
Legend: Blue = home team win; Yellow = draw; Red = away team win.

=== Second half of season ===
| Home \ Away | AKÄ | AWI | KAP | LIN | MAT | RWI | RIE | RBS | STU | WN |
|---|---|---|---|---|---|---|---|---|---|---|
| Austria Kärnten | | 0–2 | 0–1 | 2–2 | 2–4 | 2–4 | 1–0 | 0–2 | 0–3 | 2–2 |
| Austria Wien | 4–1 | | 4–3 | 0–1 | 5–1 | 1–0 | 2–0 | 1–1 | 1–0 | 1–0 |
| Kapfenberger SV | 0–0 | 1–1 | | 2–0 | 2–2 | 2–2 | 1–1 | 2–0 | 0–3 | 2–3 |
| LASK Linz | 0–0 | 0–1 | 1–1 | | 2–0 | 4–2 | 3–0 | 0–0 | 1–2 | 1–1 |
| Mattersburg | 1–1 | 1–1 | 3–1 | 2–1 | | 1–3 | 3–1 | 1–6 | 0–0 | 1–0 |
| Rapid Wien | 1–0 | 2–0 | 5–3 | 0–0 | 3–0 | | 2–1 | 0–1 | 4–1 | 3–0 |
| Ried | 3–1 | 0–1 | 2–1 | 2–2 | 3–0 | 1–3 | | 1–2 | 1–2 | 0–1 |
| Red Bull Salzburg | 1–0 | 0–1 | 1–0 | 3–0 | 2–0 | 1–1 | 2–0 | | 3–0 | 4–2 |
| Sturm Graz | 3–2 | 2–2 | 1–1 | 0–1 | 4–0 | 1–1 | 1–0 | 0–2 | | 1–0 |
| Wiener Neustadt | 2–1 | 0–1 | 3–1 | 4–0 | 2–1 | 2–2 | 2–0 | 2–3 | 0–0 | |

Source: weltfussball.de (in German)
Legend: Blue = home team win; Yellow = draw; Red = away team win.

== Top goalscorers ==
Including matches played on 13 May 2010; Source:Austrian Bundesliga

=== Top scorers ===
| Rank | Scorer | Club | Goals |
|---|---|---|---|
| 1 | (Germany) Steffen Hofmann | Rapid Vienna | 20 |
| 2 | (Austria) Roman Wallner | LASK Linz/Red Bull Salzburg | 19 |
| 3 | (Austria) Marc Janko | Red Bull Salzburg | 18 |
| 3 | (Croatia) Nikica Jelavić | Rapid Vienna | 18 |
| 5 | (Albania) Hamdi Salihi | Rapid Vienna | 17 |
| 6 | (Hungary) Róbert Waltner | SV Mattersburg | 14 |
| 7 | (Austria) Daniel Beichler | Sturm Graz | 11 |
| 8 | (Slovenia) Milenko Ačimovič | Austria Wien | 10 |
| 8 | (Austria) Johannes Aigner | SC Wiener Neustadt | 10 |
| 8 | (Austria) Christian Mayrleb | LASK Linz | 10 |

== Attendances ==
| # | Club | Average |
|---|---|---|
| 1 | Rapid | 15,343 |
| 2 | Salzburg | 12,339 |
| 3 | Sturm | 11,726 |
| 4 | Austria | 8,729 |
| 5 | LASK | 8,129 |
| 6 | Mattersburg | 5,448 |
| 7 | Ried | 5,106 |
| 8 | Kärnten | 5,035 |
| 9 | Wiener Neustadt | 3,684 |
| 10 | Kapfenberg | 3,194 |

== See also ==
- 2009–10 Austrian Cup
- 2009–10 Austrian Football First League
