= Ragnvald Soma =

Norwegian footballer (born 1979)

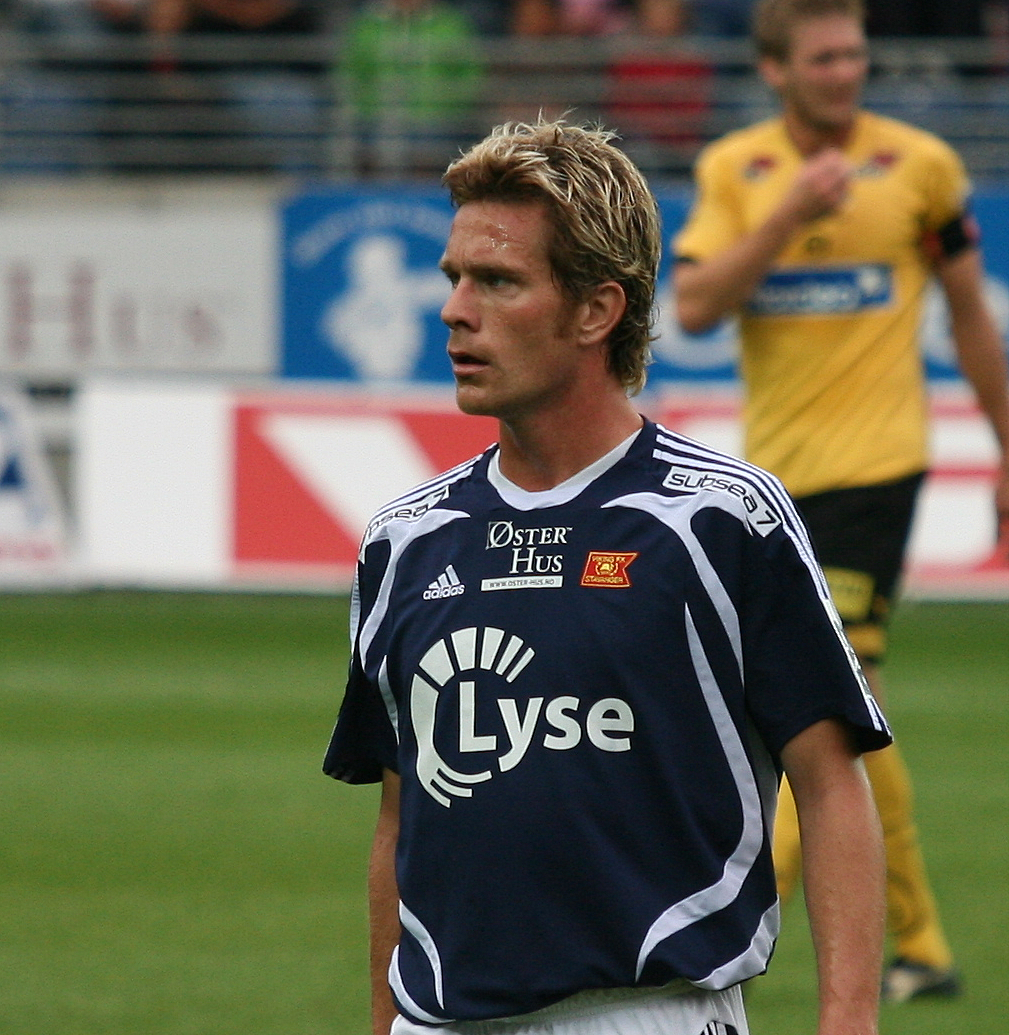

Personal information
- Full name: Ragnvald Soma
- Date of birth: 10 November 1979 (age 46)
- Place of birth: Kvernaland, Norway
- Height: 1.89 m (6 ft 2 in)
- Position: Defender

Youth career
- Frøyland

Senior career*
Years	Team	Apps	(Gls)
1997–2000	Bryne	99	(5)
2001–2002	West Ham United	7	(0)
2002–2003	Bryne	36	(2)
2004–2005	Brann	52	(1)
2006–2009	Viking	88	(4)
2009–2012	Rapid Vienna	65	(2)
2012–2013	Nordsjælland	1	(0)
2013	Lyngby	8	(1)
2013	Førde	5	(0)
2014–2015	Frøyland	21	(0)
2019	Klepp	9	(0)

International career
1995	Norway U15	7	(1)
1996	Norway U16	3	(0)
1996–1997	Norway U17	10	(1)
1997	Norway U18	5	(0)
1996	Norway U20	1	(0)
1998–2001	Norway U21	22	(0)
2004–2005	Norway	5	(0)
- * Club domestic league appearances and goals

Ragnvald Soma (born 10 November 1979) is a Norwegian former footballer who played as a defender.

== Position ==
He was primarily a central defender, although he had been both a left back and a defensive midfielder earlier in his career.

== Club career ==
=== Early career ===
Soma was drafted into the senior squad of Bryne FK after the 1996 season. Soma was also a prolific Norway youth international. During his time in Bryne, the team won promotion to the 2000 Eliteserien, with Soma amassing 99 league games.

=== West Ham United ===
In January 2001 he moved to English Premier League club West Ham United for £800,000. His stay there lasted just over one and a half years, during which Soma made only seven league appearances before returning to Bryne on a free transfer. Whilst at West Ham he played in their 1–0 victory over Manchester United at Old Trafford in the 2000–01 FA Cup, coming on as a late substitute for his debut.

=== Norwegian football ===
With Bryne relegated at the end of the 2003 season, Soma moved to SK Brann. He became an instant hit, being voted player of the year by several newspapers and becoming a regular in the Norway national team. In March 2006 he transferred to Viking for an undisclosed fee believed to be around £500,000, with Brann also getting right back Bjørn Dahl as a part exchange.

=== Austria and Denmark ===
After over three years at Viking, Soma signed for Rapid Vienna on 14 August 2009.

After a spell with the Danish Superliga side Nordsjælland, Soma joined the Danish 1st Division side Lyngby. After his contract with Lyngby expired, he was training with his old club Viking. He played the second half of 2013 for Førde IL. From 2014 he went into semi-retirement, playing for Frøyland IL. He also featured for Klepp IL.

== International career ==
Soma played 22 matches for the Norwegian under-21 team before he was capped five times for Norway between 2004 and 2005.

== Career statistics ==
Season	Club	Division	League		Cup		Total	
Season	Club	Division	Apps	Goals	Apps	Goals	Apps	Goals
1997	Bryne	1. divisjon	25	0	0	0	25	0
1998	Bryne	1. divisjon	24	0	0	0	24	0
1999	Bryne	1. divisjon	25	0	3	3	28	3
2000	Bryne	Eliteserien	25	5	1	0	26	5
2000–01	West Ham United	Premier League	4	0	1	0	5	0
2001–02	West Ham United	Premier League	3	0	2	0	5	0
2002	Bryne	Eliteserien	11	1	1	0	12	1
2003	Bryne	Eliteserien	25	1	3	0	28	1
2004	Brann	Eliteserien	26	0	7	0	33	0
2005	Brann	Eliteserien	26	1	4	0	30	1
2006	Viking	Eliteserien	24	0	4	0	28	0
2007	Viking	Eliteserien	26	1	5	0	31	1
2008	Viking	Eliteserien	18	0	3	0	21	0
2009	Viking	Eliteserien	20	3	3	1	23	4
2009–10	Rapid Wien	Bundesliga	33	1	0	0	33	1
2010–11	Rapid Wien	Bundesliga	32	1	0	0	32	1
2011–12	Rapid Wien	Bundesliga	14	0	0	0	14	0
2012–13	Nordsjælland	Danish Superliga	1	0	0	0	1	0
2012–13	Lyngby	Danish 1st Division	8	1	0	0	8	1
Career Total			370	15	37	4	407	19
