= Fabiano (footballer, born 1985) =

Brazilian footballer

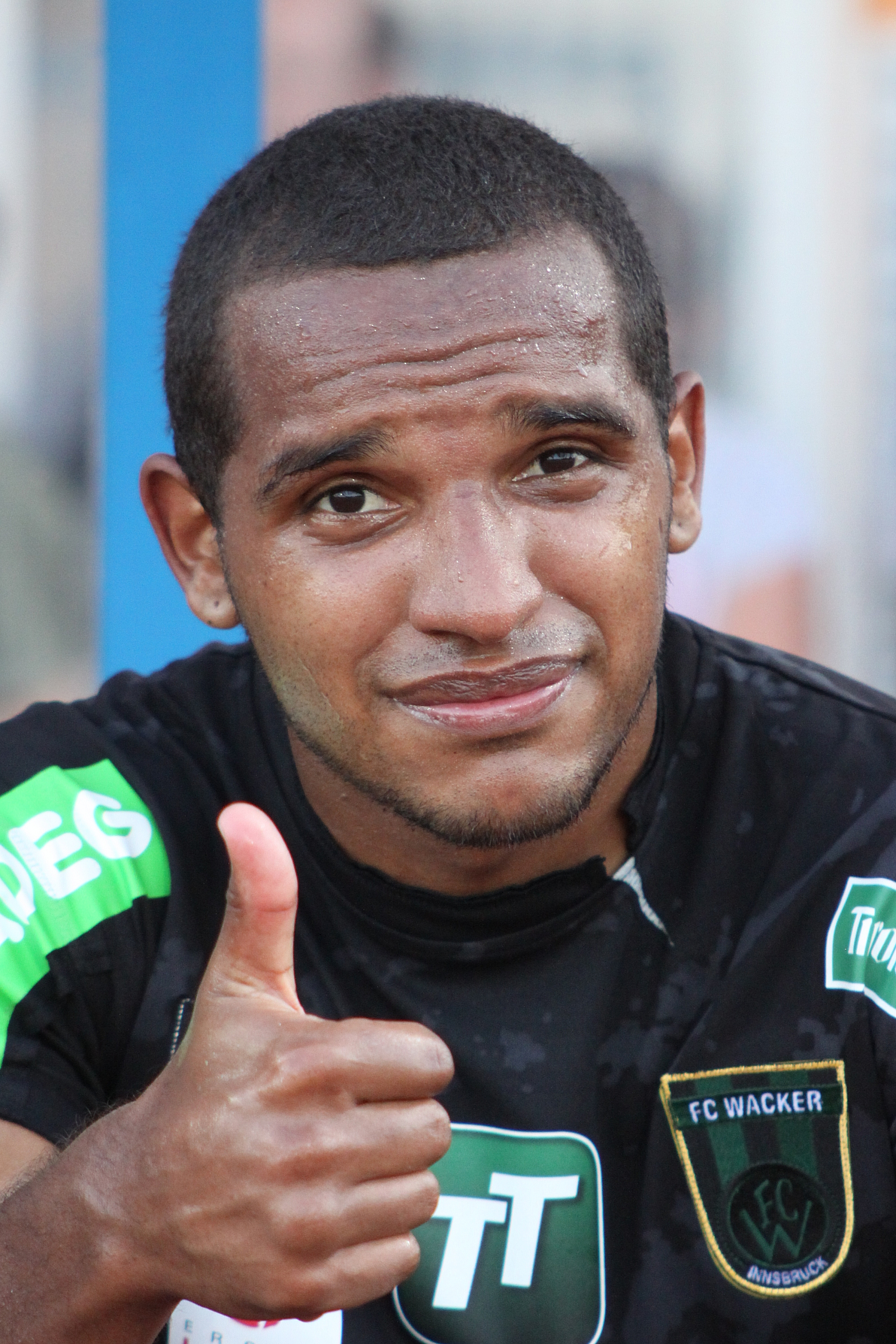

Personal information
- Full name: Fabiano de Lima Campos Maria
- Date of birth: 24 November 1985 (age 40)
- Place of birth: São José dos Campos, Brazil
- Height: 1.85 m (6 ft 1 in)
- Position: Striker

Youth career
- São José Esporte Clube
- CAJ-São Paulo

Senior career*
Years	Team	Apps	(Gls)
2004–2007	Ponte Preta		
2007	SK Rapid Wien Amateure	1	(0)
2007–2010	SK Rapid Wien	17	(0)
2008–2010	→ Wacker Innsbruck (loan)	59	(24)
2010–2011	Aris Thessaloniki F.C.	3	(0)
2011–2012	FC Metalurh Zaporizhya	19	(2)
2012–2017	LASK Linz	142	(48)
2018	Birkirkara F.C.	0	(0)
- * Club domestic league appearances and goals

Fabiano de Lima Campos Maria (born 24 November 1985), simply known as Fabiano, is a Brazilian former football player who played as striker.

== Career ==
Fabiano signed a one-year deal for SK Rapid Wien on free transfer in summer 2007, he came from Ponte Preta. In April 2008, he was awarded another year on his contract. In September 2010 Fabiano agreed one-year deal with Aris. In March 2011 he signed a one-year deal for FC Metalurh Zaporizhya as free agent.

In 2018 he featured for Birkirkara F.C.
