= Branko Bošković =

Montenegrin footballer (born 1980)

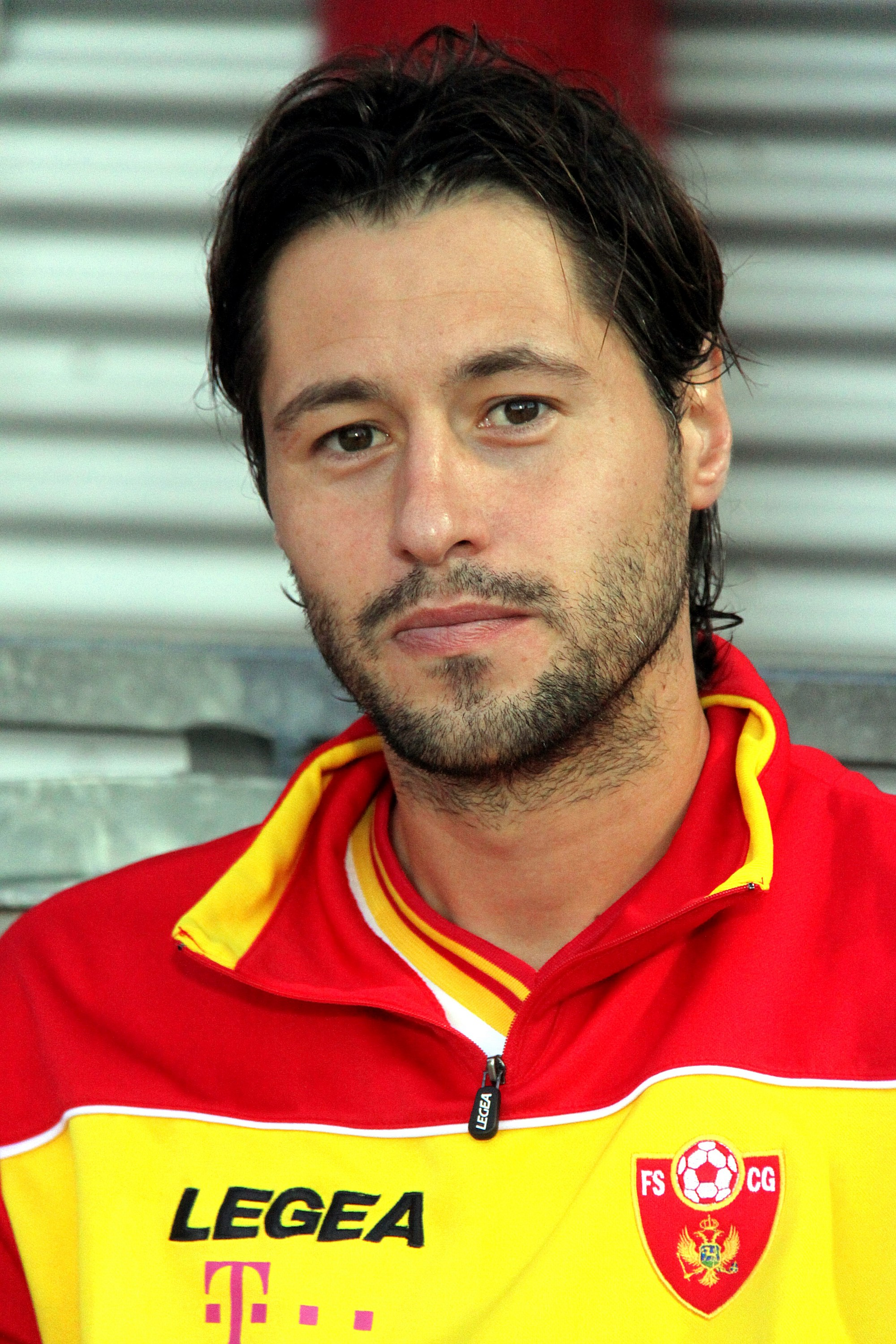
- Bošković in 2014

Personal information
- Full name: Branko Bošković
- Date of birth: 21 June 1980 (age 46)
- Place of birth: Bačka Topola, SR Serbia, SFR Yugoslavia
- Height: 1.85 m (6 ft 1 in)
- Position: Attacking midfielder

Youth career
- –1996: Mogren

Senior career*
Years	Team	Apps	(Gls)
1996–1998	Mogren	31	(8)
1999–2003	Red Star Belgrade	123	(30)
2003–2006	Paris Saint-Germain	36	(3)
2004–2005	→ Paris Saint-Germain B (loan)	6	(3)
2005–2006	→ Troyes (loan)	19	(0)
2007–2010	Rapid Wien	104	(19)
2010–2012	D.C. United	43	(1)
2013–2014	Rapid Wien	29	(4)
Total		391	(68)

International career
2002–2005	Serbia and Montenegro	12	(1)
2007–2014	Montenegro	29	(1)
- * Club domestic league appearances and goals

Branko Bošković (Montenegrin Cyrillic: Бранко Бошковић, pronounced [brâːŋko bôʃkoʋitɕ]; born 21 June 1980) is a Montenegrin retired footballer, who is best known for playing at DC United, Red Star Belgrade, Paris Saint-Germain and Rapid Wien.

== Club ==
Bošković started his pro career in 1996 with the Budva outfit FK Mogren, which was competing in lower Yugoslav division at the time. After playing there for two and a half seasons, Branko earned a dream move to Red Star Belgrade in December 1998.

In his four and a half seasons in Belgrade, he twice helped his team win the Serbo-Montenegrin Football League, in both 1999–2000 and 2000–01, as well as the Yugoslav Cup three times in 1999, 2000 & 2002. Additionally, he marked himself out as a talented and creative midfielder with a nose for goal, all of which earned him a series of national team call-ups. Still, his single most famous moment while at Red Star came during the 2002–03 UEFA Cup second round versus Lazio when he scored a goal in the return leg.

Bošković's stellar performances at Red Star got him plenty of attention from abroad, and he moved to French giants Paris Saint-Germain during summer of 2003 but failed to get a first team place upon arrival. Following the two-year stay at PSG – spent mostly out of the first team picture – he accepted a season-long loan to play with Troyes where he spent the entire 2005–06 season. After his loan spell ended, Bošković and PSG parted ways, and he spent a six-month period training with FK Rad.

In January 2007, he signed a contract with Rapid Wien until the end of the 2006–07 season. After impressing during the second half of the 2006–07 season Bošković re-signed with the club. During the 2007–08 season, Bošković was a key player helping the club capture the Austrian league title. As a result of his play, he signed a two-year extension in March 2008. During his time with Rapid, Bošković appeared in 122 official matches and scored 24 goals.

Bošković signed as a Designated Player with D.C. United of Major League Soccer in the United States on 14 June 2010. Bošković made 43 appearances, 21 starts and finished with one goal and seven assists over three seasons. Following the end of the 2012 season, Bošković and D.C. United mutually agreed to part ways, with Bošković citing a desire to return to Montenegro for family reasons.

He returned to his former club Rapid Wien in January 2013. In summer 2014, he left Rapid after his contract had expired.

== International ==
He made his debut for FR Yugoslavia against Brazil, in a friendly played 27 March 2002. He played his last match against South Korea in a friendly on 16 November 2005. In total he played 12 games – eight friendlies and four Euro 2004 qualifying matches – for FR Yugoslavia/Serbia and Montenegro. He scored one goal for the national side, coming in a 1–2 loss against Azerbaijan on 11 June 2003 during Euro 2004 qualifying.

With the formation of Montenegro, he was selected to the Montenegro national team, debuting for the nation in its first-ever match in March 2007 against Hungary. He was captain in the European Championship qualifier against England at Wembley in 2010, which ended in a goalless draw, his last international match to the end of 2011. He played again against Belarus in a 1–1 draw in 2013. He played for the first time in World Cup 2014 qualifier against Poland and provided an assist for Dejan Damjanović. He scored an extraordinary own goal 'for' England in a 2014 World Cup qualifier at Wembley which ended 4–1 against Montenegro.

== International goals ==
=== Serbia and Montenegro ===
#	Date	Venue	Opponent	Score	Result	Competition
1	11 June 2003	Shafa Stadium, Baku, Azerbaijan	Azerbaijan	1–0	1–2	Euro 2004 Qualifying

=== Montenegro ===
#	Date	Venue	Opponent	Score	Result	Competition
1	26 March 2008	Podgorica City Stadium, Podgorica	Norway	2–0	3–1	Friendly match

== Honours ==
Red Star Belgrade

- Yugoslav First League: 1999–2000, 2000–01
- Yugoslav Cup: 2002

Paris Saint-Germain

- Coupe de France: 2004

SK Rapid Wien

- Austrian Football Bundesliga: 2007–08

== Statistics ==
Season	Club	League		National Cup		European Cup			Total	
Season	Club	Apps	Goals	Apps	Goals	Comp	Apps	Goals		
Season	Club	Apps	Goals	Apps	Goals	Comp	Apps	Goals	Matches	Goals
1997-1998	FK Mogren	22	8			-	-	-	22	8
1998-1999	FK Mogren	9	0			-	-	-	9	0
1998-1999	Red Star Belgrade	6	1			C3			6	1
1999-2000	Red Star Belgrade	31	9			C3			31	9
2000-2001	Red Star Belgrade	32	9			C1/C3			32	9
2001-2002	Red Star Belgrade	28	2			C1/C3	4/1	0/0	33	2
2002-2003	Red Star Belgrade	24	8			C3	6	1	30	9
2003-2004	Red Star Belgrade	2	1			C3	1	1	3	2
2003-2004	Paris SG	24	3	2	0	-	-	-	26	3
2004-2005	Paris SG	12	0	2	2	C1	4	0	18	2
2005-2006	→ Troyes AC (Ioan)	19	0	1	0	-	-	-	20	0
2006-2007	Rapid Wien	10	0			-	-	-	29	4
2007-2008	Rapid Wien	11	4			-	-	-	11	4
2008-2009	Rapid Wien	27	6			-	-	-	27	6
2009-2010	Rapid Wien	29	3			C3	6	0	35	3
2010	D.C. United	13	0	-	-	-	-	-	13	0
2011	D.C. United	4	0	1	2	-	-	-	5	2
2012	D.C. United	24	1	2	0	-	-	-	26	1
2012-2013	Rapid Wien	10	1	0	0	-	-	-	10	1
2013-2014	Rapid Wien	19	3	1	0	-	-	-	20	3

Appearances and goals counted correct as of 6 October 2012
