= Markus Heikkinen =

Finnish sporting director and former football player (born 1978)

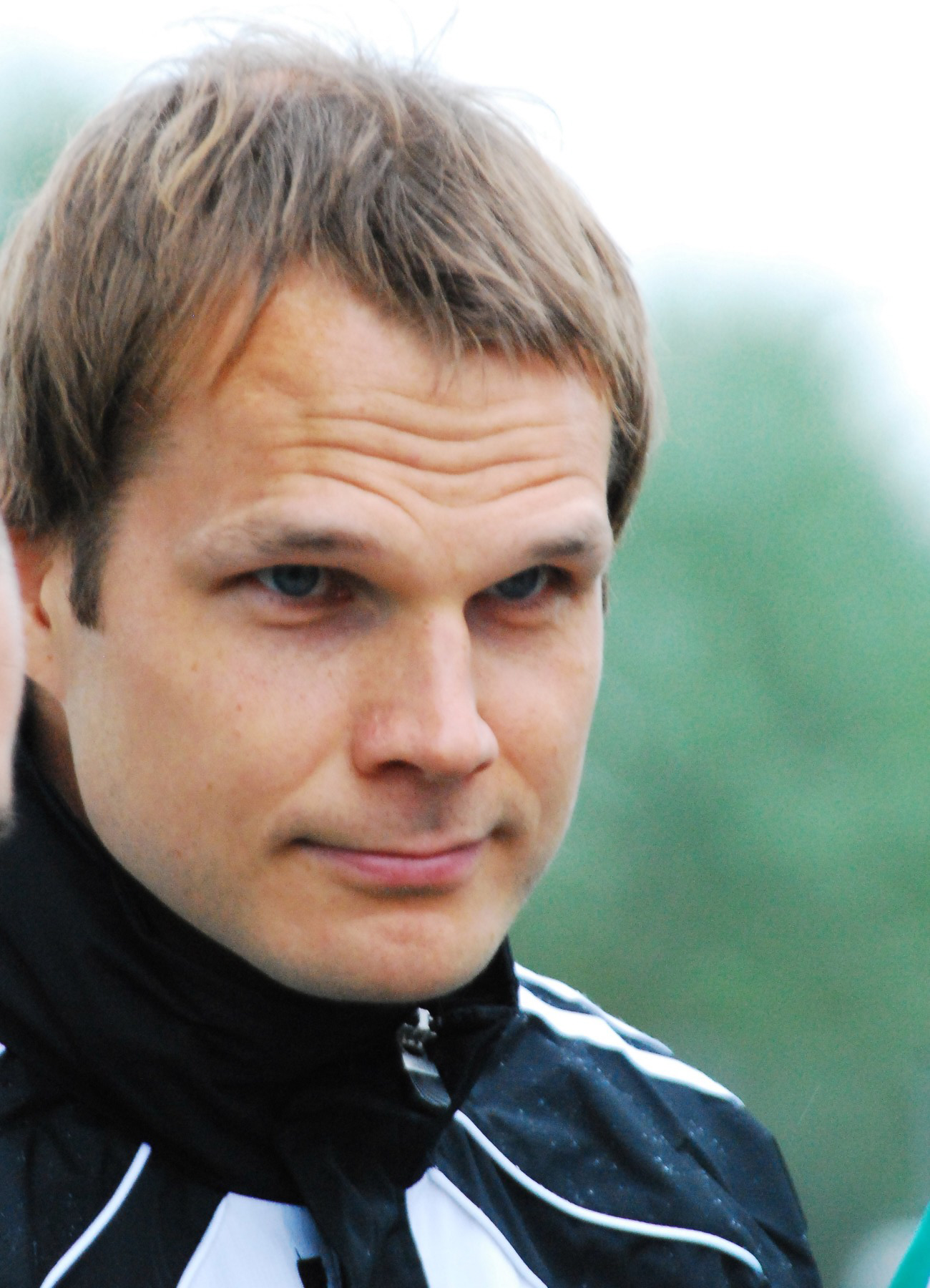
- Heikkinen with Rapid Wien in 2012

Personal information
- Date of birth: 13 October 1978 (age 48)
- Place of birth: Katrineholm, Sweden
- Height: 1.85 m (6 ft 1 in)
- Positions: Centre back; defensive midfielder

Senior career*
Years	Team	Apps	(Gls)
1996–1997	OPS	24	(5)
1997–1998	TPS	22	(0)
1998–2001	MyPa	43	(1)
2001–2003	HJK	85	(1)
2003	→ Portsmouth (loan)	2	(0)
2003–2005	Aberdeen	68	(2)
2005–2007	Luton Town	77	(3)
2007–2013	Rapid Wien	173	(4)
2013	Start	10	(2)
2014–2015	HJK	40	(0)
2016–2018	AC Oulu	57	(0)

International career
	Finland U18	2	(0)
	Finland U21	3	(0)
2002–2011	Finland	61	(1)

Managerial career
- 2016–2025: AC Oulu (sporting director)
- * Club domestic league appearances and goals

Markus Heikkinen (born 13 October 1978), nicknamed Mako, is a Finnish former professional footballer who played as a centre back or defensive midfielder. He was most recently the sporting director of Veikkausliiga side AC Oulu.

He previously played for Oulun Palloseura (OPS), Turun Palloseura (TPS), MyPa, HJK Helsinki, Portsmouth, Aberdeen, Luton Town, Rapid Wien and Start, before returning to his hometown and ending his professional playing career in AC Oulu.

== Playing career ==
Heikkinen started his senior career in OPS, when the club played in Ykkönen in 1996 season. Heikkinen scored five goals, most in his team, but ultimately OPS were relegated back to Kakkonen, and Heikkinen left the club. He spent three seasons in Veikkausliiga with TPS and MyPa, before joining HJK Helsinki.

In January 2003, Heikkinen joined English club Portsmouth on a three-month loan deal. Whilst at Portsmouth on loan, he contributed two appearances as they won the First Division Championship and promotion to the Premier League.

During his two years with Aberdeen, Heikkinen was popular and important player, who usually featured in central midfield, where he had a reputation as a tough tackling and dependable player. Despite repeated attempts by Aberdeen manager Jimmy Calderwood to get the player to sign a new deal, he indicated that he was unsettled at Aberdeen and wanted to move on.

An integral part of the Luton side that finished 10th in the 2005–06 Championship season, Heikkinen collected four awards – the Player of the Year trophy, Players' Player of the Season, Internet Player of the Season and the Luton News Player of the Season.

On 29 December 2006, in a game for Luton against Birmingham City he was feared to have a compound fracture of the fibula, however it was in fact a nasty gash down his leg, after a late challenge by midfielder Fabrice Muamba. He returned to action against Stoke City on 17 February 2007.

After his years in England Heikkinen played six seasons for Rapid Wien. He was a key player of the team, making over 170 appearances for the Austrian Bundesliga side.

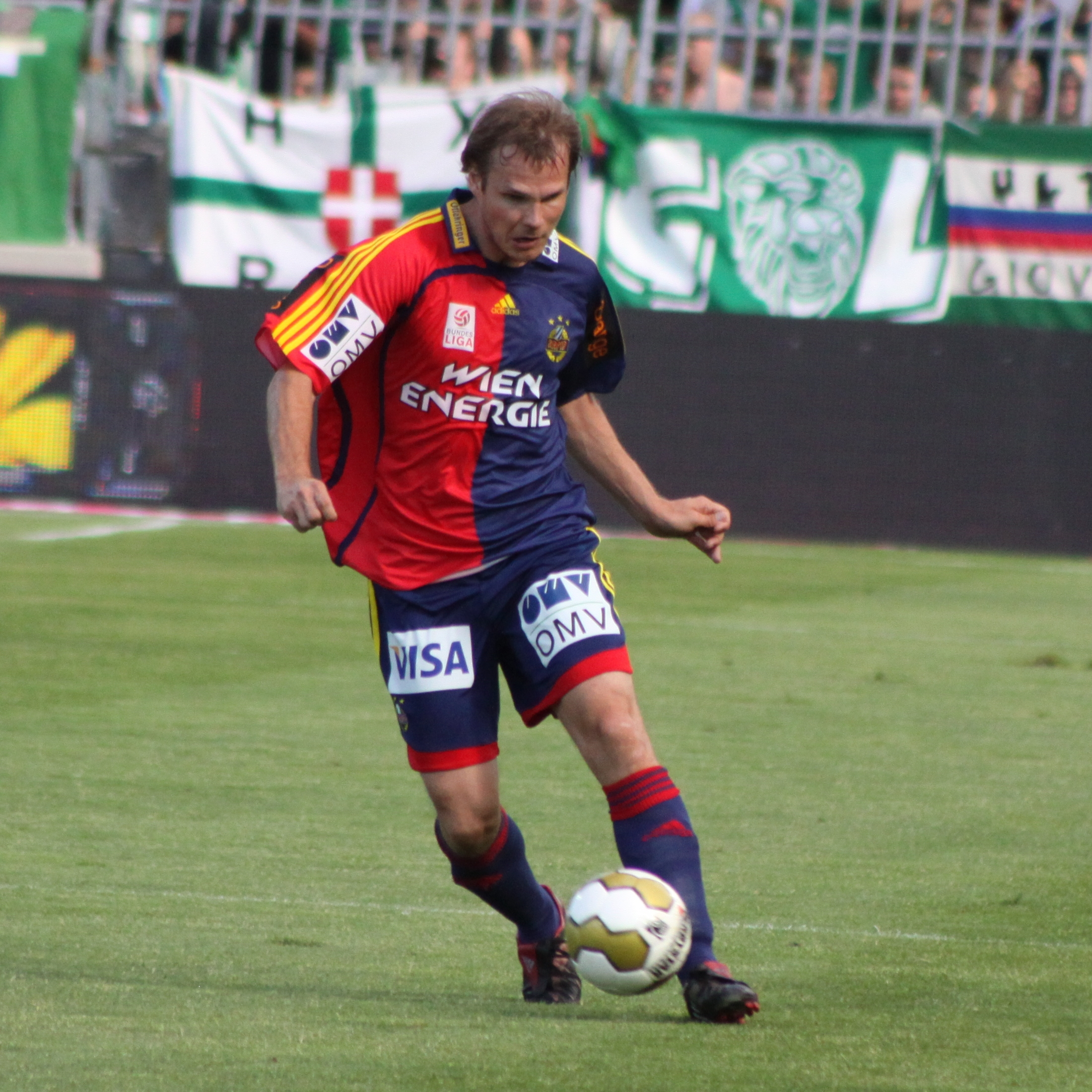
Heikkinen with Rapid Wien in 2009

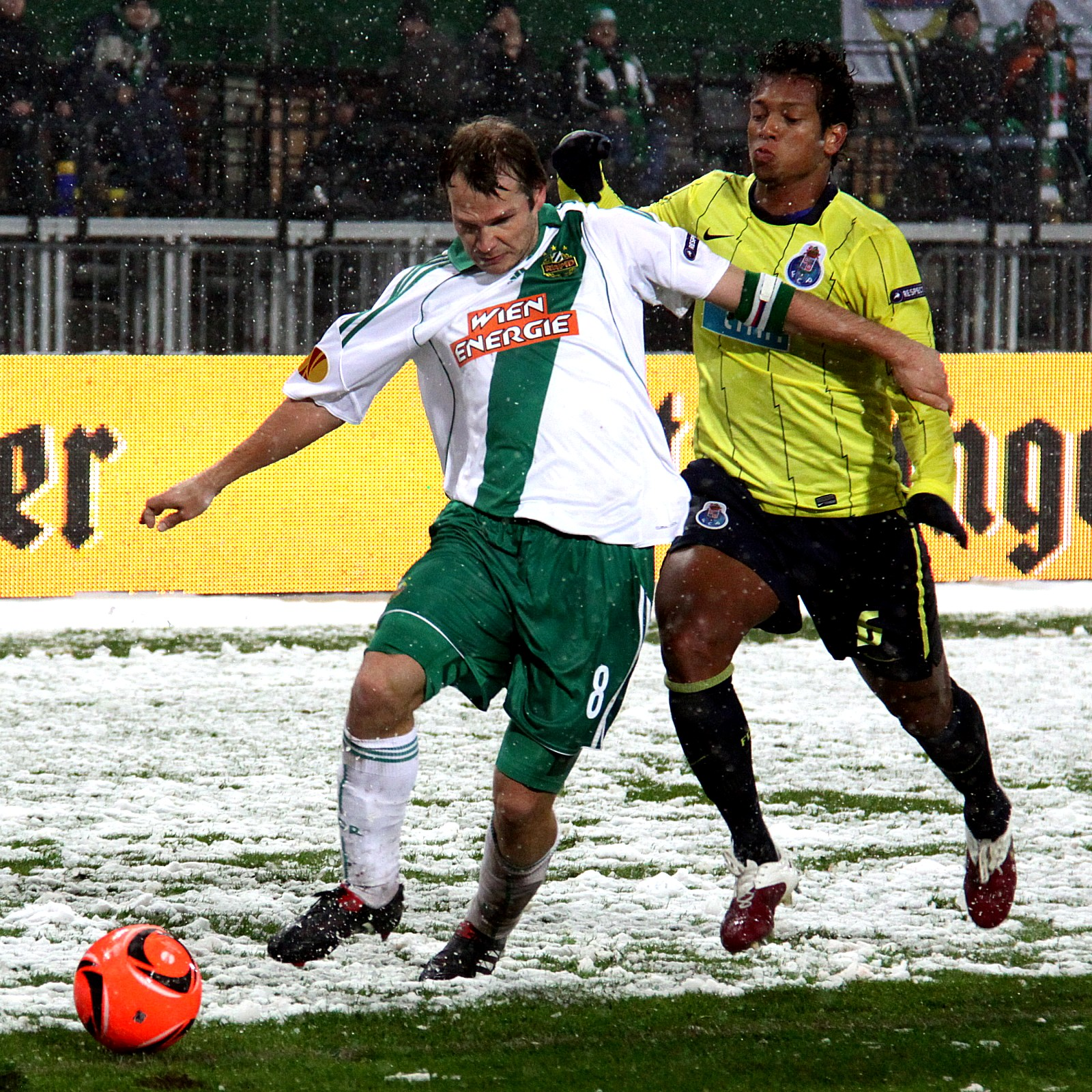
Heikkinen playing for Rapid Wien against Porto in the 2010–11 UEFA Europa League

On 10 August 2013, he signed for Norwegian Tippeligaen club Start. Heikkinen helped Start avoid relegation with solid performances.

After years abroad, "Mako" returned to Finland and HJK in December 2013. After two seasons with the Helsinki-based side, on 2 September 2015 it was reported that the 36-year-old Heikkinen had signed a three-year player-coach contract with his hometown team AC Oulu.

== International career ==
Heikkinen made his national team debut on 4 January 2002 against Bahrain. He immediately became an important defensive player to his native team. He often played as defensive midfielder. However, he returned to his old position as centre back in 2010, after Hannu Tihinen retired in professional football. He announced his retirement from international football on 26 September 2011.

== Later career ==
During the last years of his playing career, Heikkinen worked also as a sporting director of AC Oulu in second-tier Ykkönen. Since the end of 2018, he has served as the club's sole sporting director, and helped AC Oulu to promote to Veikkausliiga after the 2020.

== Career statistics ==
=== Club ===
As of 12 January 2024

Appearances and goals by club, season and competition
Club	Season	League			National cup (Note: Includes Suomen Cup, FA Cup and Austrian Cup)		Other		Continental		Total	
Club	Season	Division	Apps	Goals	Apps	Goals	Apps	Goals	Apps	Goals	Apps	Goals
OPS	1996	Ykkönen	24	5	0	0	—		—		24	5
TPS	1997	Veikkausliiga	22	0	0	0	—		4 (Note: Includes UEFA Intertoto Cup)	0	26	0
MyPa	1998	Veikkausliiga	14	0	0	0	—		—		14	0
MyPa	1999	Veikkausliiga	29	1	0	0	—		—		29	1
MyPa	Total		43	1	0	0	0	0	0	0	43	1
HJK	2000	Veikkausliiga	32	0	1	0	—		4 (Note: Includes UEFA Cup/UEFA Europa League)	0	37	0
HJK	2001	Veikkausliiga	33	1	0	0	—		4	0	37	1
HJK	2002	Veikkausliiga	20	0	0	0	—		2	0	22	0
HJK	Total		85	1	1	0	0	0	10	0	96	1
Portsmouth (loan)	2002–03	First Division	2	0	0	0	0	0	—		2	0
Aberdeen	2003–04	Scottish Premier League	38	0	0	0	0	0	—		38	0
Aberdeen	2004–05	Scottish Premier League	30	2	0	0	0	0	—		30	2
Aberdeen	Total		68	2	0	0	0	0	0	0	68	2
Luton	2005–06	Championship	40	2	1	0	0	0	—		41	2
Luton	2006–07	Championship	37	1	0	0	0	0	—		37	1
Luton	Total		77	3	1	0	0	0	0	0	78	3
Rapid Wien	2007–08	Austrian Bundesliga	28	1	0	0	—		8 (Note: Includes UEFA Intertoto Cup and UEFA Cup/UEFA Europa League)	0	6	2
Rapid Wien	2008–09	Austrian Bundesliga	32	0	2	0	—		2 (Note: Includes UEFA Champions League)	0	36	0
Rapid Wien	2009–10	Austrian Bundesliga	28	1	2	1	—		10	0	40	2
Rapid Wien	2010–11	Austrian Bundesliga	30	2	0	0	—		9	0	39	2
Rapid Wien	2011–12	Austrian Bundesliga	29	1	0	0	—		—		29	1
Rapid Wien	2012–13	Austrian Bundesliga	26	0	1	0	—		9	0	35	1
Rapid Wien	Total		173	4	5	1	0	0	38	0	217	5
Start	2013	Tippeligaen	10	2	0	0	—		—		10	2
HJK	2014	Veikkausliiga	21	0	4	0	2 (Note: Includes Finnish League Cup)	0	11 (Note: Includes UEFA Champions League and UEFA Europa League)	0	37	0
HJK	2015	Veikkausliiga	19	0	0	0	3	0	6	0	37	0
HJK	Total		40	0	4	0	5	0	17	0	68	0
AC Oulu	2016	Ykkönen	18	0	1	0	—		—		19	0
AC Oulu	2017	Ykkönen	18	0	2	0	—		—		20	0
AC Oulu	2018	Ykkönen	21	0	4	0	—		—		25	0
AC Oulu	Total		57	0	7	0	0	0	0	0	64	0
Career total			601	19	18	1	5	0	69	0	693	20

=== International ===
Appearances and goals by national team and year
National team	Year	Apps	Goals
Finland	2002	4	0
Finland	2003	7	0
Finland	2004	2	0
Finland	2005	7	0
Finland	2006	6	0
Finland	2007	7	0
Finland	2008	8	0
Finland	2009	9	0
Finland	2010	7	0
Finland	2011	4	0
Total		61	0
