= Markus Katzer =

Austrian footballer

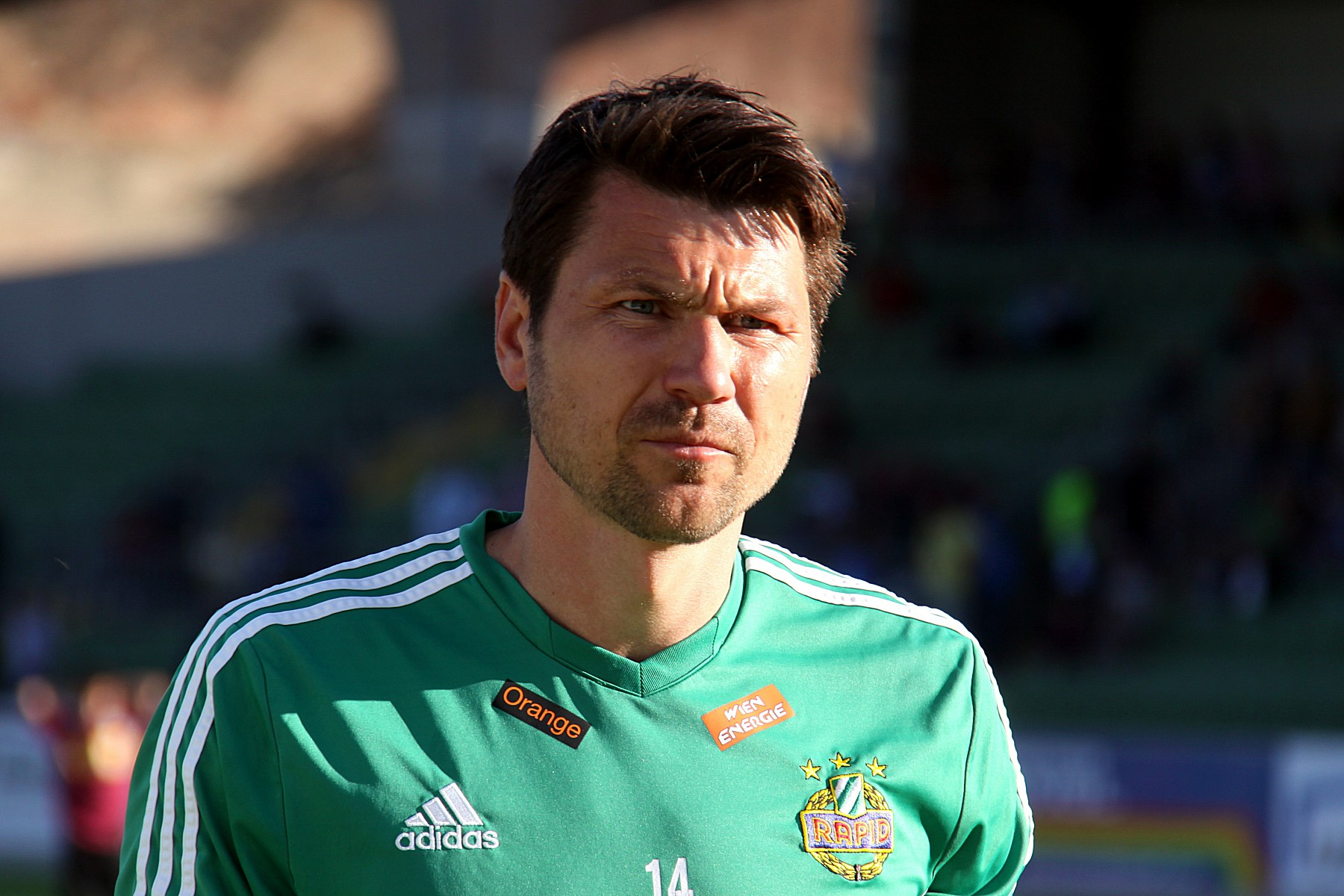
- Katzer in 2013

Personal information
- Date of birth: 11 December 1979 (age 46)
- Place of birth: Vienna, Austria
- Height: 1.86 m (6 ft 1 in)
- Position: Defender

Youth career
- 1998–2000: ASK Erlaa

Senior career*
Years	Team	Apps	(Gls)
2000–2004	Admira Wacker	91	(12)
2004–2013	Rapid Wien	216	(19)
2013–2015	Admira Wacker	44	(3)
2015–	First Vienna	29	(6)

International career^{‡}
2003–2008	Austria	11	(0)
- * Club domestic league appearances and goals as of 7 July 2016 ‡ National team caps and goals as of 21 August 2008

Markus Katzer (born 11 December 1979) is an Austrian former football player who played most of his games for Rapid Wien. He last played for First Vienna FC.

== Club career ==
He began his career at ASK Erlaa from whom he transferred to FC Admira Wacker Mödling. He played there until 2004 when he moved to Rapid Wien with whom he won the league title twice and played in the UEFA Champions League.

He is a left wing-back.

== Club statistics ==
Club	Season	League		Cup		League Cup		Europe		Total	
Club	Season	Apps	Goals	Apps	Goals	Apps	Goals	Apps	Goals	Apps	Goals
Admira Wacker
Admira Wacker	2000–01	1	0	0	0	0	0	0	0	1	0
Admira Wacker	2001–02	27	1	0	0	0	0	0	0	27	1
Admira Wacker	2002–03	33	4	1	1	0	0	0	0	34	5
Admira Wacker	2003–04	31	7	2	0	0	0	0	0	33	7
Admira Wacker	2013–14	20	2	1	0	0	0	0	0	21	2
Admira Wacker	Total	112	14	4	1	0	0	0	0	116	15
Rapid Wien
Rapid Wien	2004–05	31	4	1	1	0	0	4	0	36	5
Rapid Wien	2005–06	13	0	1	0	0	0	2	0	16	0
Rapid Wien	2006–07	28	2	0	0	0	0	0	0	28	2
Rapid Wien	2007–08	17	3	0	0	0	0	4	0	21	3
Rapid Wien	2008–09	19	1	3	0	0	0	2	0	24	1
Rapid Wien	2009–10	26	4	3	0	0	0	12	0	41	4
Rapid Wien	2010–11	32	1	4	1	0	0	9	1	45	3
Rapid Wien	2011–12	27	1	3	0	0	0	0	0	30	1
Rapid Wien	2012–13	23	2	2	0	0	0	7	1	32	3
Rapid Wien	Total	216	18	15	2	0	0	40	2	273	22
Career Total		328	32	19	3	0	0	40	2	389	37

Updated to games played as of 16 June 2014.

== International career ==
He made his debut for Austria in an August 2003 friendly match against Costa Rica and was a participant at the EURO 2008.

== National team statistics ==
Austria national team
Year	Apps	Goals
2003	1	0
2004	1	0
2005	4	0
2006	1	0
2007	3	0
2008	1	0
Total	11	0

== Honours ==
- Austrian Football Bundesliga (2):
  - 2005, 2008
