= René Gartler =

Austrian footballer

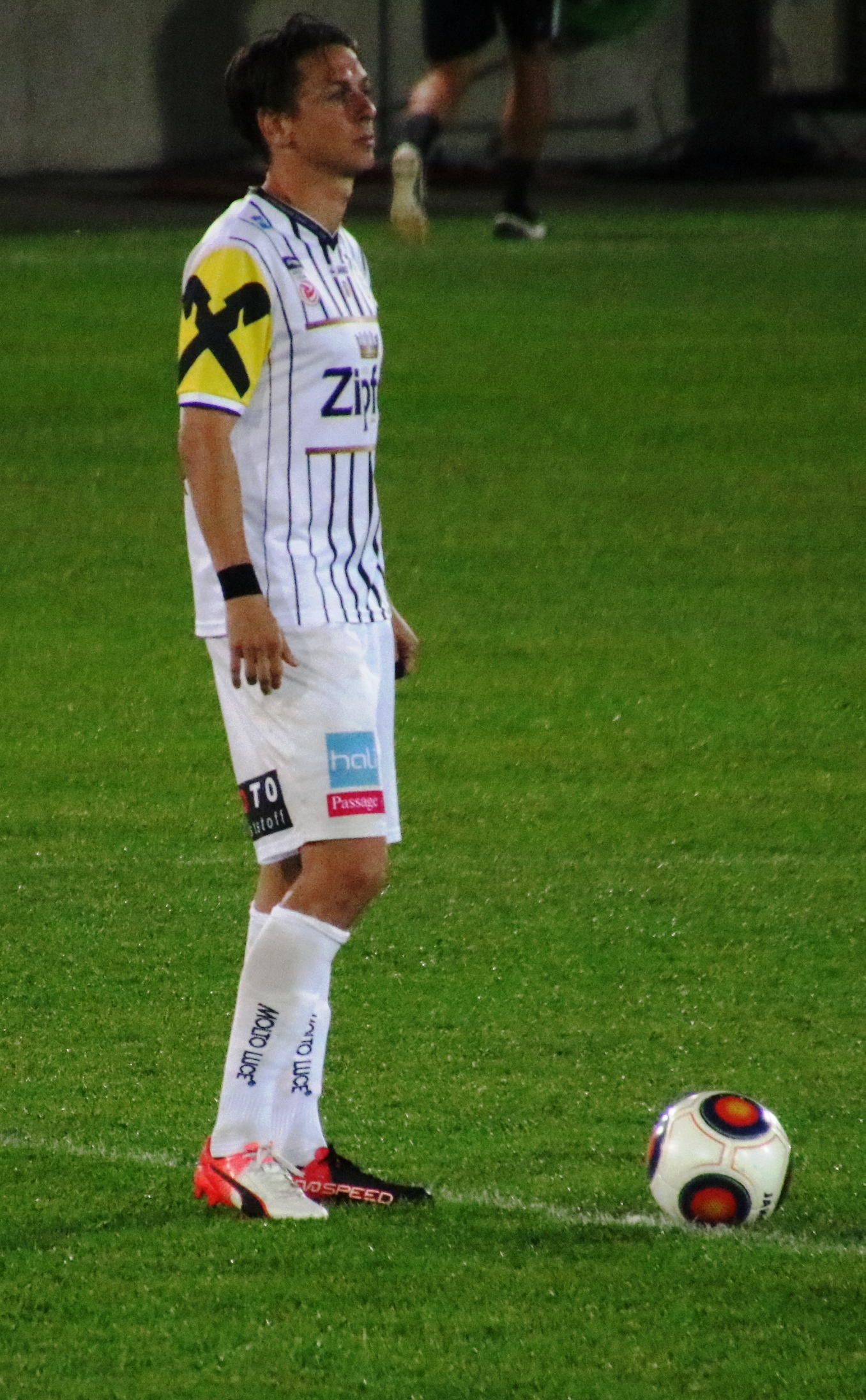
- Gartler playing for LASK in 2016.

Personal information
- Date of birth: 21 October 1985 (age 41)
- Place of birth: Vienna, Austria
- Height: 1.83 m (6 ft 0 in)
- Position: Forward

Team information
- Current team: LASK (assistant coach)

Youth career
- 1992–2002: Rapid Wien

Senior career*
Years	Team	Apps	(Gls)
2002–2010	Rapid Wien II	49	(24)
2003–2012	Rapid Wien	59	(10)
2005	→ Kapfenberger SV (loan)	18	(2)
2006	→ St. Pölten (loan)	12	(1)
2007–2008	→ Lustenau 07 (loan)	31	(21)
2012–2014	Ried	60	(30)
2014–2015	Sandhausen	16	(1)
2015–2018	LASK Linz	97	(39)
2018–2020	St. Pölten	45	(11)
2020–2021	Juniors OÖ	13	(3)
Total		400	(146)

International career
2004	Austria U19	4	(3)
2004	Austria U20	2	(0)

Managerial career
- 2021–: LASK (assistant)
- * Club domestic league appearances and goals

René Gartler (born 21 October 1985) is an Austrian football coach and a former player. He is an assistant coach with LASK.

== Career statistics ==
As of match played on 8 April 2018

Appearances and goals by club, season and competition
Club	Season	League			Cup		League Cup		Other		Total	
Club	Season	Division	Apps	Goals	Apps	Goals	Apps	Goals	Apps	Goals	Apps	Goals
Rapid Wien	2008–09	Austrian Football Bundesliga	3	0	0	0	—				3	0
Rapid Wien	2009–10	Austrian Football Bundesliga	19	3	1	0	—		1	0	21	3
Rapid Wien	2010–11	Austrian Football Bundesliga	16	4	2	1	—		8	3	26	8
Rapid Wien	2011–12	Austrian Football Championship	16	3	2	2	—				18	5
Rapid Wien	Total		54	10	5	3	0	0	9	3	68	16
Rapid Wien B	2010–11	Austrian Regionalliga	5	6	—						5	6
Ried	2012–13	Austrian Football Bundesliga	29	15	5	3	—		3	1	37	19
Ried	2013–14	Austrian Football Bundesliga	31	15	3	1	—				34	16
Ried	Total		60	30	8	4	0	0	3	1	71	35
Sandhausen	2014–15	2. Bundesliga	16	1	1	0	—				17	1
LASK Linz	2015–16	Austrian Football First League	35	14	4	5	—				39	19
LASK Linz	2016–17	Austrian Football First League	33	21	5	3	—				38	24
LASK Linz	2017–18	Austrian Football Bundesliga	23	3	3	1	—				26	4
LASK Linz	Total		91	38	12	9	0	0	0	0	103	47
Career totals			226	85	26	16	0	0	12	4	264	105
