= Stefan Kulovits =

Austrian footballer

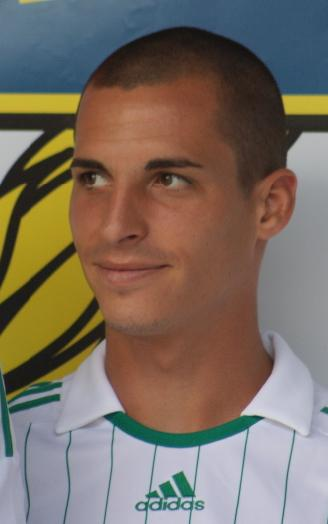
- Kulovits with Rapid Wien in 2008

Personal information
- Date of birth: 19 April 1983 (age 43)
- Place of birth: Vienna, Austria
- Height: 1.78 m (5 ft 10 in)
- Position: Midfielder

Team information
- Current team: Eintracht Braunschweig (assistant manager)

Youth career
- SC Red Star Penzing
- 1998–2001: Rapid Wien

Senior career*
Years	Team	Apps	(Gls)
2002–2013	Rapid Wien	202	(4)
2013–2020	SV Sandhausen	127	(1)
Total		329	(5)

International career
	Austria U16	6	(0)
	Austria U17	1	(0)
	Austria U19	9	(0)
2003–2005	Austria U21	18	(0)
2005–2011	Austria	5	(0)

Managerial career
- 2021: SV Sandhausen (interim)
- 2022–2023: Rapid Wien II
- 2022–2025: Rapid Wien (assistant)
- 2025: Rapid Wien (interim manager)
- 2025: Rapid Wien (interim manager)
- 2026–: Eintracht Braunschweig (assistant)
- * Club domestic league appearances and goals

Stefan Kulovits (born 19 April 1983) is an Austrian professional football manager and a former midfielder. He is an assistant manager of German club Eintracht Braunschweig.

== Club career ==
=== Rapid Wien ===
Kulovits came through the youth ranks of Rapid Wien and made it to the senior team in the 2002–03 season after a year at the reserves team. He won two league titles with Rapid and played in the 2005–06 UEFA Champions League with them.

=== SV Sandhausen ===
Kulovits signed for 2. Bundesliga club SV Sandhausen in June 2013 and in his first season was appointed captain of the team. He made over 120 competitive appearances for the club and announced his retirement as a footballer at the conclusion of the 2019–20 season,

== Coaching career ==
=== SV Sandhausen ===
He was named interim manager on 15 February 2021. He was sacked on 22 September 2021.

=== Rapid Wien II ===
On 3 January 2022, Kulovits was hired as the head coach of Rapid Wien II in the 2. Liga.

=== Rapid Wien ===
On 24 April 2025, Kulovits was appointed as the interim manager of Austrian Bundesliga side Rapid Wien for the final 5 games of the season. He had previously been working at the club as a coach under former manager Robert Klauß. On 28 November 2025, he was appointed the interim manager by Rapid once more.

== International career ==
Kulovits made his debut for the Austria national team in a February 2005 friendly match against Cyprus.

== Honours ==
Rapid Wien

- Austrian Football Bundesliga: 2004–05, 2007–08
