= Christian Thonhofer =

Austrian footballer

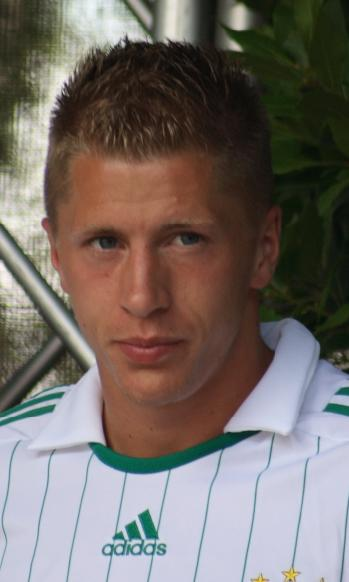
- Thonhofer in 2008

Personal information
- Date of birth: 26 May 1985 (age 41)
- Place of birth: Vienna, Austria
- Height: 1.77 m (5 ft 9 1/2 in)
- Position: Right-back

Team information
- Current team: SC Neudörfl
- Number: 6

Youth career
- SK Kaiserebersdorf
- Austria Wien

Senior career*
Years	Team	Apps	(Gls)
2002–2006	Admira Wacker Mödling	65	(3)
2007–2011	Rapid Wien	78	(0)
2010–2011	→ Wiener Neustadt (loan)	35	(1)
2012–2013	Wolfsberger AC	25	(1)
2013–2014	SV Wimpassing		
2014–2015	SC/ESV Parndorf	28	(7)
2015–2016	SK Austria Klagenfurt	17	(0)
2016–2018	Mauerwerk	54	(1)
2019–2020	SC Reisenberg	26	(10)
2021–2022	ASKÖ Kobersdorf	23	(3)
2022–	SC Neudörfl	14	(0)

International career
2004–2005	Austria U21	11	(1)
- * Club domestic league appearances and goals as of 21:20, 7 March 2023 (UTC)

Christian Thonhofer (born 26 May 1985) is an Austrian football player currently playing for SC Neudörfl.

== Honours ==
- Austrian Football Bundesliga winner: 2008.
