= Andreas Dober =

Austrian footballer (born 1968)

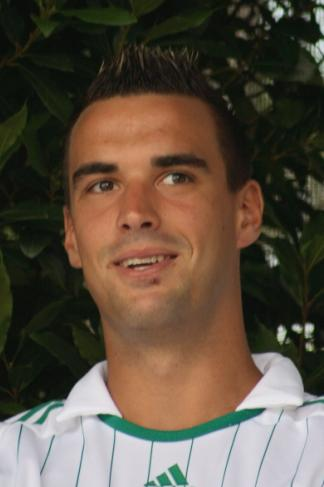
- Dober in 2008

Personal information
- Date of birth: 31 March 1986 (age 40)
- Place of birth: Vienna, Austria
- Height: 1.82 m (6 ft 0 in)
- Position: Defender

Youth career
- Rapid Wien

Senior career*
Years	Team	Apps	(Gls)
2004–2011	Rapid Wien	135	(7)
2005	→ Rheindorf Altach (loan)	12	(0)
2011–2012	TSV Hartberg	11	(1)
2012–2013	First Vienna	32	(4)
2013–2014	SKN St. Pölten	21	(6)
2014–2015	Ethnikos Achna	8	(0)
2015–2017	SKN St. Pölten	54	(4)
2017–	Rapid Wien II	0	(0)

International career^{‡}
2003	Austria under-17	4	(0)
2005	Austria under-19	2	(0)
2004–2005	Austria under-20	2	(0)
2004–2008	Austria under-21	18	(3)
2005–	Austria	3	(0)
- * Club domestic league appearances and goals as of 2 March 2017 (UTC) ‡ National team caps and goals as of 26 May 2016

Andreas Dober (born 31 March 1986) is an Austrian footballer who plays for Rapid Wien II as a defender.

== Club career ==
Born on 31 March 1986, in Vienna, Dober came through the youth ranks at Rapid Wien and made his professional debut in the 2004–2005 season only to be loaned out to SC Rheindorf Altach in the second half of that season. He established himself as a regular starter for Rapid on his return, in the 2005/2006 season.

== International career ==
He made his debut for Austria in an October 2005 World Cup qualification match against England and has collected 3 caps so far in total.

== Honours ==
- Austrian Football Bundesliga (1):
  - 2007-08
- Austrian Football First League (1):
  - 2015-16
