= Hannes Eder =

Austrian footballer

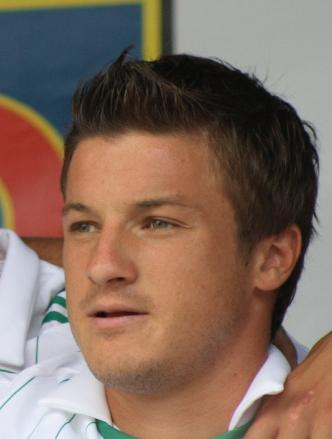

Personal information
- Date of birth: 5 September 1983 (age 43)
- Place of birth: Innsbruck, Austria
- Height: 1.80 m (5 ft 11 in)
- Position: Defender

Youth career
- SV Hall
- Innsbrucker AC

Senior career*
Years	Team	Apps	(Gls)
2002–2007	FC Wacker Innsbruck	99	(6)
2007–2011	SK Rapid Wien	65	(4)
2011	→ SønderjyskE (loan)	2	(0)
2011–2012	SC Rheindorf Altach	21	(1)
2012–2013	SK Austria Klagenfurt	11	(0)

International career^{‡}
2006	Austria	2	(0)
- * Club domestic league appearances and goals as of 15 August 2011 ‡ National team caps and goals as of 1 December 2009

Hannes Eder (born 5 September 1983) is an Austrian football player.

== Honours ==
- Austrian Football Bundesliga winner: 2008.
