= Franz Fekete Stadium =

Austrian football stadium

Coordinates: 47°26′38″N 15°18′02″E

Franz-Fekete-Stadion
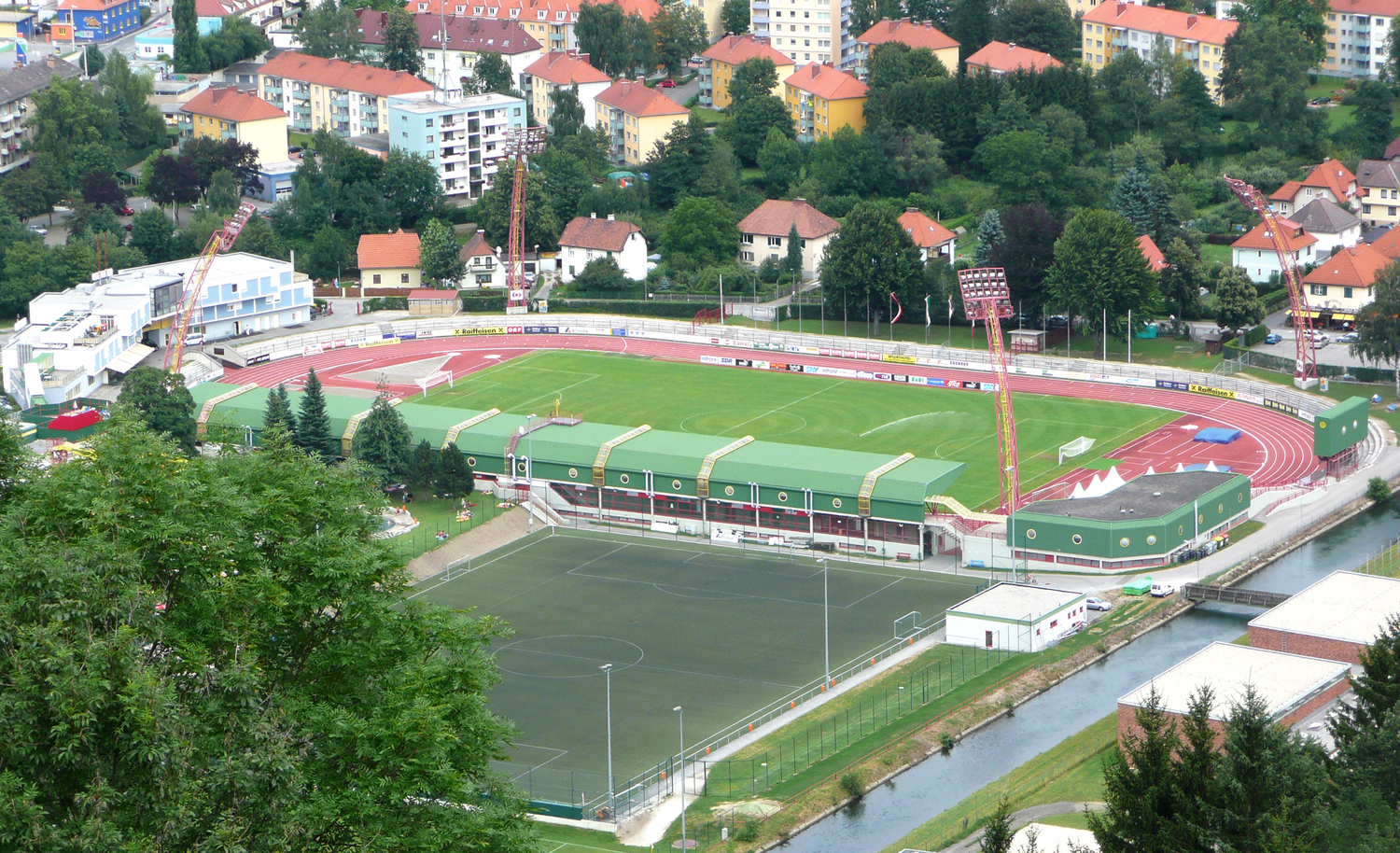
- Interactive map of Franz-Fekete-Stadion
- Former names: Alpenstadion
- Location: Kapfenberg, Austria
- Capacity: 9,640
- Surface: Natural Turf

Construction
- Opened: 10 September 1950
- Renovated: 1987, 2003, 2011
- Cost: £6.80 Million

Tenant
- Kapfenberger SV

Franz Fekete Stadion is a multipurpose stadium in Kapfenberg, Austria. It is used mostly for football matches and is the home ground of Kapfenberger SV. The stadium was constructed in 1950, and currently holds 9,640 people. It was named in 2001 after long time Mayor Franz Fekete (1921–2009).

== History ==
The opening game was played against Austria Vienna who beat the home side 8–1. The stadium held the 1994, 1995 and 1996 Austrian Supercup finals. In the 1996/97 Grazer AK played a large number of their home games at the stadium. They also played their three home games in the UEFA Cup in Kapfenberg, with the game against Inter Milan played in front of 11,000 spectators.
