= Jürgen Patocka =

Austrian footballer

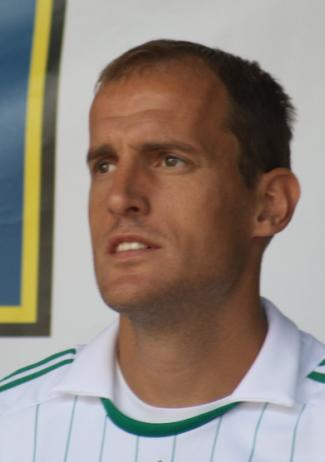

Personal information
- Full name: Jürgen Patocka
- Date of birth: 30 July 1977 (age 49)
- Place of birth: Vienna, Austria
- Height: 1.92 m (6 ft 4 in)
- Position: Centre back

Youth career
- SC Untersiebenbrunn

Senior career*
Years	Team	Apps	(Gls)
2000	Floridsdorfer AC	20	(0)
2001–2004	SC Austria Lustenau	92	(12)
2004–2007	SV Mattersburg	90	(6)
2007–2012	Rapid Vienna	111	(7)
2012–2014	SC Austria Lustenau	36	(0)
2014–	FC Egg	38	(6)

International career^{‡}
2007–2009	Austria	5	(0)

Managerial career
- 2014–: FC Egg
- * Club domestic league appearances and goals as of 23 March 2016 ‡ National team caps and goals as of December 2009

Jürgen Patocka (German pronunciation: [ˈjʏʁɡn̩ ˈpaːtɔka]; born 30 July 1977) is an Austrian former international footballer who managed and played for FC Egg as a left-sided central defender.

== Club career ==
Late-developing Patocka started his professional career with Second Division outfit SC Austria Lustenau for whom he played over three seasons before making his debut in the top flight with SV Mattersburg in 2004. With Mattersburg, the tall defender lost two successive cup finals to Austria Wien and in 2007 he moved to Rapid Wien to win his first league title in 2008. Patocka returned to Austria Lustenau for the start of the 2012–13 season. He joined FC Egg in the Vorarlbergliga in 2014 as player/manager.

== International career ==
He made his debut for Austria in a May 2007 friendly match against Scotland and was part of the Austrian squad during EURO 2008 on home soil but never figured in any of Austria's three games.

== Honours ==
- Austrian Football Bundesliga (1):
  - 2008
