= SK Austria Kärnten =

- Full name: SK Austria Kärnten
- Founded: 2007
- Dissolved: 2010
- Ground: Hypo-Arena, Klagenfurt
- Capacity: 30,000
- 2009–10: 10th, Austrian Football Bundesliga
Home colours	Away colours

SK Austria Kärnten was an Austrian association football club, from Klagenfurt, Carinthia.

== History ==
The club was formed on 1 June 2007 and took over the license of ASKÖ Pasching to play in the Austrian Football Bundesliga. SK Austria took over the former name of rivalling FC Kärnten (as well as several notable players and sponsors' funds). In June 2010, the club announced it was filing for bankruptcy and the city founded a new club, SK Austria Klagenfurt.

== Stadium ==
Austria Kärnten played its home games at Hypo-Arena in the south-west end of Klagenfurt.

== Manager history ==
- (Austria) Walter Schachner (2007)
- (Austria) Klaus Schmidt (2007–2008)
- (Netherlands) Frank Schinkels (2008–2009)
- (Slovenia) Jože Prelogar (2009–2010)
