= BWT X Upper Austrian Arena =

Multi-use stadium in Ried im Innkreis, Austria

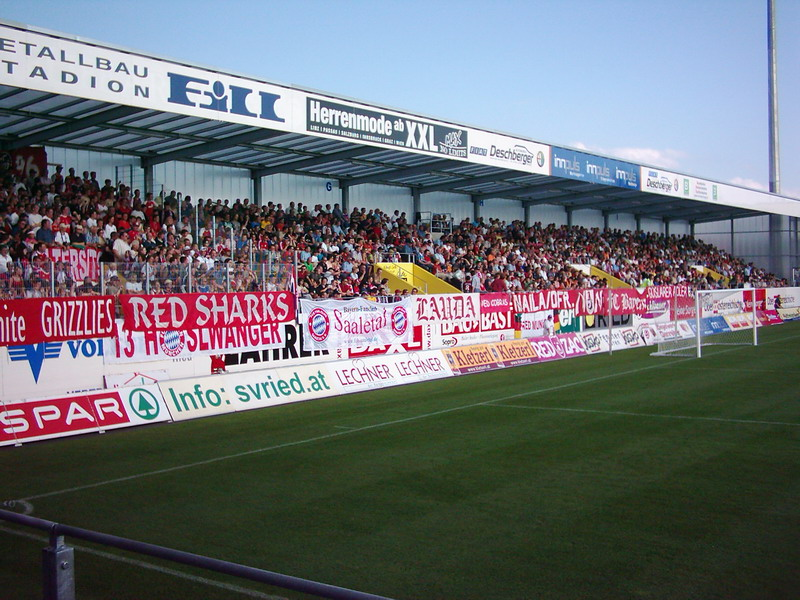
- Interactive map of BWT X Upper Austrian Arena
- Former names: HomeLife-Arena (2003–2004) Fill Metallbau Stadion (2004–2009); Keine Sorge Arena (2009–2018); Josko Arena (2018–2023); Innviertel Arena (2023–2025) BWT X Oberösterreichische Arena (since 2025)
- Location: Ried im Innkreis, Austria
- Coordinates: 48°12′28″N 13°28′42″E
- Capacity: 7,680

Construction
- Opened: 15 July 2003

Tenant
- SV Ried

The Josko Arena, formerly Fill Metallbau Stadion, is a football stadium in Ried im Innkreis, Austria. It is the home ground of SV Ried. The stadium holds 7,680 spectators and was built in 2003. The stadium was renamed in "Josko Arena", after the sponsor "Josko".

== History ==
The BWT X Upper Austrian Arena was built on the grounds of the Rieder Messe and offers space for 7,300 spectators. It replaced the Rieder Stadium as the home stadium of SV Ried, which only has around 1,100 seats. However, the Ried Stadium will continue to be used for athletics competitions and training of SV Ried.

The spectator stands of the Josko Arena are completely covered and it is a pure football stadium. This means that there is no athletics facility around the pitch and spectators sit or stand right next to the pitch. This guarantees a better atmosphere than in a spacious area. The stadium has a V.I.P.area, which was expanded to 500 seats in 2013 and now has two price categories, as well as press workstations with fibre optic internet connection. The SV Ried fan clubs are represented in the west stand, which is located behind one of the two goals and serves as a standing room. The away sector, which can accommodate around 600 spectators, also consists of standing room.

In the summer of 2013, the arena received a turf heating system, and in the summer of 2015, the floodlights were upgraded to 1,200 lux illuminance. Since the 2016/17 season, the stadium has had the Fussl Wikinger Corner, a smoke-free family sector with a total of 376 seats.

== Gallery ==
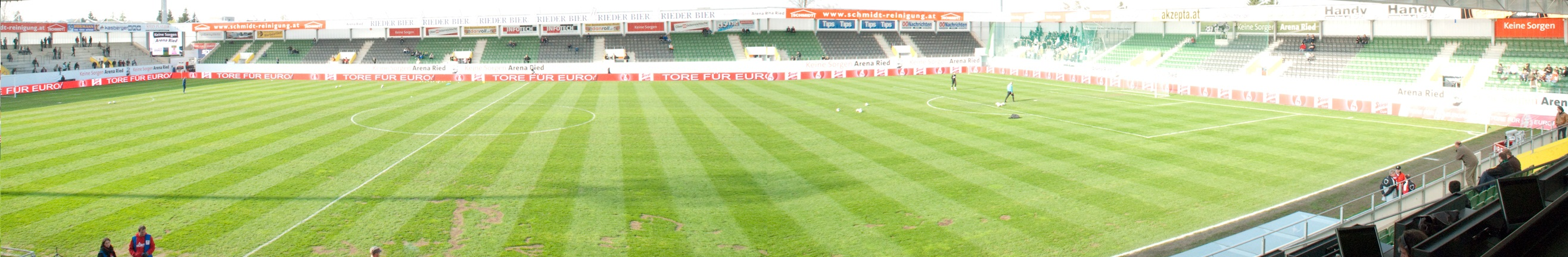
Panorama
