= Pappelstadion =

Multi-use stadium in Mattersburg, Austria

Coordinates: 47°44′21″N 16°24′23″E

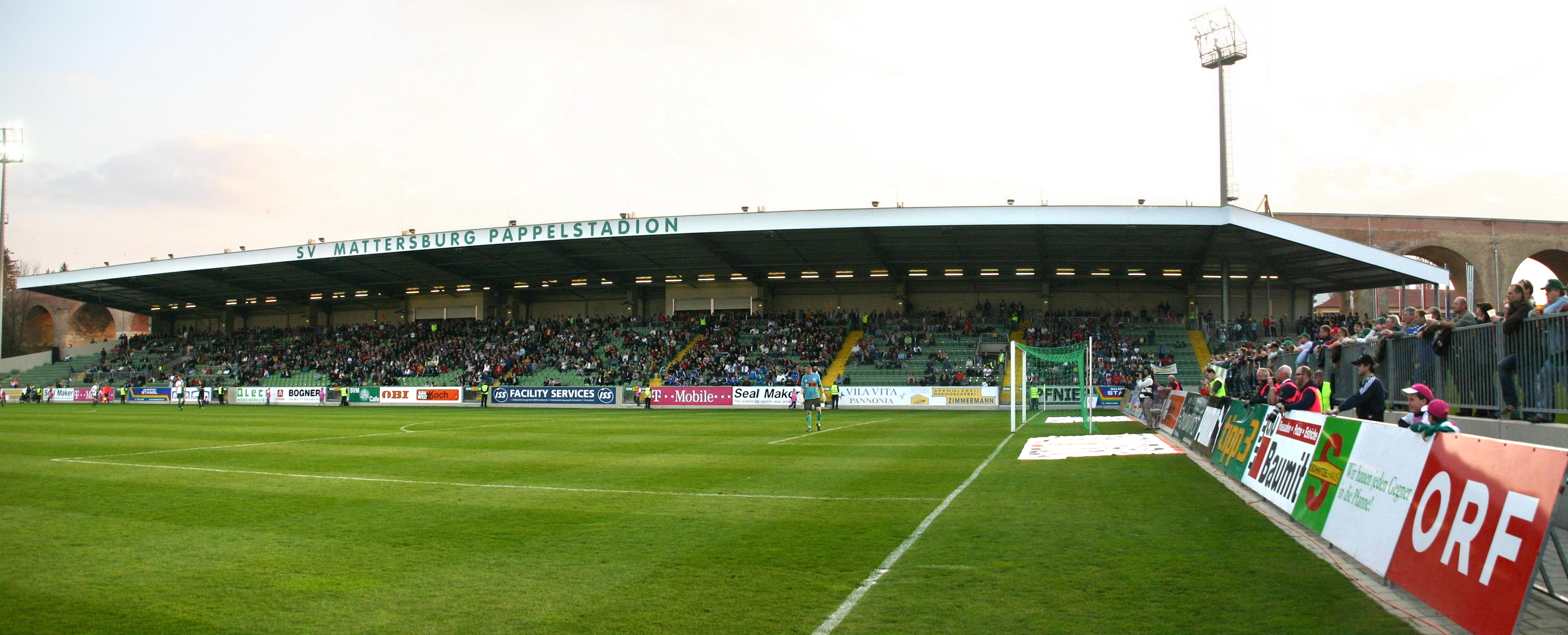
- Interactive map of Pappelstadion
- Location: Mattersburg, Austria
- Capacity: 15,700
- Surface: Natural Turf
- Record attendance: 16,800

Construction
- Opened: 10 August 1952
- Renovated: 2001, 2003, 2007

Tenants
- SV Mattersburg

Pappelstadion is a multi-use stadium in Mattersburg, Austria. It is currently used mostly for football matches and was the home ground of SV Mattersburg. The stadium holds 15,700 spectators since its most recent renovation and is named for the numerous poplar trees surrounding the stands.
