= 2007–08 Austrian Football Bundesliga =

96th season of top-tier football league in Austria

Austrian Bundesliga
- Season: 2007–08
- Dates: 10 July 2007 – 26 April 2008
- Champions: Rapid Wien
- Relegated: Wacker Innsbruck
- Champions League: Rapid Wien
- UEFA Cup: Red Bull Salzburg; Austria Wien
- Intertoto Cup: Sturm Graz
- Matches: 180
- Goals: 480 (2.67 per match)
- Top goalscorer: Alexander Zickler (16 goals)
- Biggest home win: Austria Wien 6–1 Wacker Innsbruck; Sturm Graz 6–1 Altach
- Biggest away win: Salzburg 0–7 Rapid Wien
- Highest scoring: Ried 5–3 Sturm Graz

The 2007–08 Austrian Football Bundesliga was the 96th season of top-tier football in Austria. The competition is officially called T-Mobile Bundesliga, named after the Austrian branch of German mobile phone company T-Mobile. The season started on 8 July 2007, and the 36th and last round of matches took place on 26 April 2008.

== League table ==
Pos	Team	Pld	W	D	L	GF	GA	GD	Pts	Qualification or relegation
1	Rapid Wien (C)	36	21	6	9	69	36	+33	69	Qualification to Champions League second qualifying round
2	Red Bull Salzburg	36	18	9	9	63	42	+21	63	Qualification to UEFA Cup first qualifying round (Note: According to the UEFA coefficients, only the 2nd place team would qualify for the UEFA Cup Qualification. This season, however, the UEFA Cup Qualification spot that would usually be awarded to the Austrian Cup winner will be given to the 3rd place team of the Bundesliga.)
3	Austria Wien	36	15	13	8	46	33	+13	58	Qualification to UEFA Cup first qualifying round
4	Sturm Graz	36	15	11	10	60	41	+19	56	Qualification to Intertoto Cup second round
5	Mattersburg	36	13	14	9	55	43	+12	53	
6	LASK Linz	36	14	11	11	54	47	+7	53	
7	Ried	36	10	8	18	38	53	−15	38	
8	Rheindorf Altach	36	8	12	16	37	64	−27	36	
9	Austria Kärnten	36	8	9	19	26	58	−32	33	
10	Wacker Innsbruck (R)	36	6	11	19	32	63	−31	29	Relegation to Austrian First Football League

Source: weltfussball.de (in German)
Rules for classification: 1) points; 2) goal difference; 3) number of goals scored.
(C) Champions; (R) Relegated

== Results ==
Teams played each other four times in the league. In the first half of the season each team played every other team twice (home and away), and then did the same in the second half of the season.

=== First half of season ===
Home \ Away	AKÄ	ALT	AWI	LIN	MAT	RWI	RIE	RBS	STU	WKR
Austria Kärnten		1–1	2–1	1–4	1–1	1–2	0–3	1–0	0–0	2–0
Rheindorf Altach	4–1		1–0	2–2	0–0	0–1	2–3	1–1	0–0	2–1
Austria Wien	1–0	1–0		1–1	2–2	2–2	2–1	2–2	1–0	6–1
LASK Linz	1–0	2–0	1–1		0–2	2–0	1–0	4–1	2–2	5–0
Mattersburg	5–2	4–1	0–1	0–0		3–2	5–1	1–1	2–2	3–1
Rapid Wien	4–0	0–2	0–0	4–4	1–0		4–0	1–0	1–5	3–1
Ried	3–1	3–1	0–1	3–0	1–2	0–3		2–0	5–3	0–0
Red Bull Salzburg	3–0	4–1	0–1	2–1	2–1	2–1	2–0		4–1	3–1
Sturm Graz	1–3	3–1	2–2	4–0	0–0	1–0	5–0	0–0		3–0
Wacker Innsbruck	1–1	0–1	2–0	1–2	2–2	1–1	0–1	3–1	0–0	

Source: weltfussball.de (in German)
Legend: Blue = home team win; Yellow = draw; Red = away team win.

=== Second half of season ===
Home \ Away	AKÄ	ALT	AWI	LIN	MAT	RWI	RIE	RBS	STU	WKR
Austria Kärnten		1–1	0–1	2–1	1–0	0–2	0–0	0–0	0–2	0–2
Rheindorf Altach	0–1		0–4	0–0	2–0	2–1	3–2	1–1	1–2	1–1
Austria Wien	0–1	1–1		0–0	0–0	0–0	2–0	3–1	1–2	2–1
LASK Linz	4–0	3–0	2–1		2–1	1–2	1–0	1–1	1–2	3–3
Mattersburg	1–0	3–3	1–1	1–0		1–0	1–1	3–2	1–1	2–1
Rapid Wien	2–1	3–0	2–0	2–0	3–1		4–0	1–3	2–1	4–1
Ried	3–0	3–1	1–1	1–1	0–0	0–1		1–2	0–0	0–0
Red Bull Salzburg	1–1	4–0	2–0	4–0	4–0	0–7	2–0		3–0	2–0
Sturm Graz	3–1	6–1	1–2	1–2	2–1	0–2	2–0	1–1		2–0
Wacker Innsbruck	0–0	1–1	1–2	2–0	0–5	1–1	1–0	1–2	1–0	

Source: weltfussball.de (in German)
Legend: Blue = home team win; Yellow = draw; Red = away team win.

== Top goalscorers ==
Rank	Scorer	Club	Goals
1	(Germany) Alexander Zickler	Red Bull Salzburg	16
2	(Austria) Mario Haas	Sturm Graz	14
3	(Austria) Ivica Vastić	LASK Linz	13
4	(Germany) Carsten Jancker	SV Mattersburg	12
4	(Albania) Hamdi Salihi	SV Ried	12
6	(Austria) Sanel Kuljic	Austria Wien	11
6	(Austria) Christian Mayrleb	LASK Linz	11
6	(Bosnia and Herzegovina) Samir Muratović	Sturm Graz	11
9	(Austria) Erwin Hoffer	Rapid Wien	10
9	(Germany) Steffen Hofmann	Rapid Wien	10

== Top assist providers ==
- Steffen Hofmann was the assist leader of the league, having provided a total of 25 assists (both Austrian and European record).

== Attendances ==
#	Football club	Average attendance
1	Rapid Wien	14,336
2	Red Bull Salzburg	13,900
3	Sturm Graz	12,015
4	LASK	11,723
5	Austria Kärnten	11,277
6	SV Mattersburg	7,877
7	Austria Wien	6,684
8	Wacker Innsbruck	5,752
9	Rheindorf Altach	5,365
10	SV Ried	4,448
