= 2012–13 SK Rapid Wien season =

Rapid Wien
2012–13 season
- President: Rudolf Edlinger
- Coach: Peter Schöttel / Zoran Barisic
- Stadium: Gerhard Hanappi Stadium, Vienna, Austria
- Bundesliga: 3rd
- ÖFB-Cup: Quarter-finals
- Europa League: Group stage (4th)
- Top goalscorer: League: Deni Alar (15 goals); All: Deni Alar (22 goals)
- Highest home attendance: 17,000 vs. FK Austria Wien, 4 August 2012
- Lowest home attendance: 10,900 vs. FC Admira Wacker Mödling, 16 March 2013

The 2012–13 SK Rapid Wien season was the 115th season in club history.

== Review and events ==
Rapid Wien gave a contract extension to midfielder Boris Prokopič during the off-season. Rapid Wien started pre-season on 6 June 2012. Rapid hired Helmut Schulte as the new Sporting Director. However, fans were critical of the hiring and don't want him as Sporting Director.

== Matches ==
=== Legend ===
Win Draw Loss Postponed

=== Bundesliga ===
==== League results and fixtures ====
21 July 2012 1	Rapid Wien	4–0	Wacker Innsbruck	Vienna
18:30 CET	Boyd 4' 71'; Kulovits 20'; Trimmel (yellow card) 47'; Drazan 56'; Burgstaller (yellow card) 76'	Report	Schütz (yellow card) 83'; Piesinger (yellow card) 87'	Stadium: Gerhard Hanappi Stadium; Attendance: 14,800; Referee: Alexander Harkam

28 July 2012 2	SC Wiener Neustadt	0–1	Rapid Wien	Wiener Neustadt
18:30 CET	Lenko (yellow card) 21' (yellow card) 61' (red card); Mimm (yellow card) 27'		Trimmel (yellow card) 22'; Kulovits (yellow card) 30'; Sonnleitner 54'; Gerson (yellow card) 80'	Stadium: Stadion Wiener Neustadt; Attendance: 6,200; Referee: Dominik Ouschan

4 August 2012 3	Rapid Wien	0–3	Austria Wien	Vienna
16:00 CET			Kienast 38' 52'; Šimkovič (yellow card) 55' (goal) 83'; Jun (yellow card) 68'	Stadium: Gerhard Hanappi Stadium; Attendance: 17,000 (sell-out); Referee: Gerhard Grobelnik

11 August 2012 4	Red Bull Salzburg	0–2	Rapid Wien	Wals-Siezenheim
16:00 CET	Schwegler (yellow card) 51'		Boyd (yellow card) 8'; Alar 27'; Schimpelsberger (yellow card) 67'; Grozurek 76'; Kulovits (yellow card) 81'; Trimmel (yellow card) 88'	Stadium: Red Bull Arena; Attendance: 16,600; Referee: Rene Eisner

18 August 2012 5	Rapid Wien	3–0	Sturm Graz	Vienna
18:30	Burgstaller 15'; Alar 57'; Hofmann 70'		Hütter (yellow card) 16'; Madl (yellow card) 45'; Gratzei (yellow card) 46'; Schloffer (yellow card) 75'	Stadium: Gerhard Hanappi Stadium; Attendance: 14,783; Referee: Mag. Oliver Drachta

26 August 2012 6	Wolfsberger AC	1–0	Rapid Wien	Wolfsberg
16:00	Baldauf 18'; Jacobo (yellow card) 55' de Paula (yellow card) 75'; Topcagić (yellow card) 84'		Pichler (yellow card) 59'; Ildiz (yellow card) 63'	Stadium: Lavanttal-Arena; Attendance: 7,300; Referee: Mag. Markus Hameter

2 September 2012 7	Rapid Wien	3–0	SV Mattersburg	Vienna
16:00	Boyd 12', 66'; Trimmel 49'			Stadium: Gerhard Hanappi Stadium; Attendance: 15,000; Referee: Schüttengruber

15 September 2012 8	Rapid Wien	0–0	Admira Wacker Mödling	Vienna
18:30		Report		Stadium: Gerhard Hanappi Stadium; Attendance: 16,100; Referee: Harkam

23 September 2012 9	SV Ried	0–2	Rapid Wien	Ried im Innkreis
16:30		Report	Burgstaller 31'; Trimmel 84'	Stadium: Keine Sorgen Arena; Attendance: 6,100; Referee: Schoergenhofer

29 September 2012 10	Wacker Innsbruck	0–2	Rapid Wien	Innsbruck
18:30		Report	Katzer 48'; Grozurek 86'	Stadium: Tivoli-Neu; Attendance: 6,000; Referee: Dieter Muckenhammer

7 October 2012 11	Rapid Wien	1–1	SC Wiener Neustadt	Vienna
18:30	Boyd 86'		9' Rakowitz	Stadium: Gerhard Hanappi Stadium

21 October 2012 12	Austria Wien	2–0	Rapid Wien	Vienna
16:00	Gorgon 29', 52'	Summary		Stadium: Franz Horr Stadium; Attendance: 10,370

28 October 2012 13	Rapid Wien	2–0	Red Bull Salzburg	Vienna
16:00	Hofmann 14'; Boyd 47' (yellow card) 68'; Schimpelsberger (yellow card) 87'	Summary	Klein (yellow card) 45+1'; Mané (yellow card) 50'; Hinteregger (yellow card) 86'	Stadium: Gerhard Hanappi Stadium; Attendance: 15,226; Referee: Alexander Harkam

3 November 2012 14	Sturm Graz	2–1	Rapid Wien	Graz
18:30	Okotie (yellow card) 14'; Sukuta-Pasu 38'; Madl (yellow card) 42'; Kainz 47' (yellow card) 56'; Dudić (yellow card) 49'	Summary	Ildiz (yellow card) 25'; Burgstaller 67' (yellow card) 90'; Trimmel (yellow card) 77'; Sonnleitner (yellow card) 88'; Schrammel (yellow card) 90'	Stadium: UPC-Arena; Attendance: 13,259; Referee: Markus Hameter

11 November 2012 15	Rapid Wien	0–2	Wolfsberger AC	Vienna
18:30	Schaub (yellow card) 88'	Summary	Falk 6', 48' de Paula (yellow card) 82'	Stadium: Gerhard Hanappi Stadium; Attendance: 13,500; Referee: Rene Eisner

17 November 2012 16	SV Mattersburg	0–3	Rapid Wien	Mattersburg
18:30	Seidl (yellow card) 30' (yellow card) 41' (red card); Malić (yellow card) 45'; Bürger (yellow card) 63'; Mörz (yellow card) 69'	Summary	Alar 4', 31'; Boyd 37' (yellow card) 50'; Königshofer (yellow card) 45+1'	Stadium: Pappelstadion; Attendance: 4,500; Referee: Robert Schörgenhofer

25 November 2012 17	Admira Wacker Mödling	0–2	Rapid Wien	Maria Enzersdorf
15:00			Alar 69' (pen.); Burgstaller (90.)	Stadium: Bundesstadion Südstadt; Attendance: 6,782; Referee: Krassnitzer

1 December 2012 18	Rapid Wien	4–3	SV Ried	Vienna
18:30	Trimmel (yellow card) 12'; Boyd 25'; Alar 45' 58' (pen.) (yellow card) 61' (goal) 80'; Pichler (yellow card) 73'; Sonnleitner (yellow card) 84'; Drazan (yellow card) 90+4'	Summary	Gartler 34'; Žulj (yellow card) 38'; Ziegl (yellow card) 57'; Riegler (yellow card) 60'; Hadžić 85' (pen.) (yellow card) 90+2'; Markus Grössinger 90+1'; Gebauer (yellow card) 90+2'; Reifeltshammer (red card) 90+2'	Stadium: Gerhard Hanappi Stadium; Attendance: 12,936; Referee: Alexander Harkam

9 December 2012 19	Rapid Wien	2–1	Wacker Innsbruck	Vienna
16:00	Alar 44'; Boyd 51'; Schimpelsberger (yellow card) 56'	Summary	Sonnleitner 43' (o.g.); Švejnoha (yellow card) 80'; Perstaller (yellow card) 90+3'	Stadium: Gerhard Hanappi Stadium; Attendance: 12,300; Referee: Rene Eisner

15 December 2012 20	SC Wiener Neustadt	1–0	Rapid Wien	Wiener Neustadt
18:30	Tadic 44'; Mimm (yellow card) 54'; Offenbacher (yellow card) 56'; Siebenhandl (yellow card) 78'; Wallner (yellow card) 81'; Berger (yellow card) 90+1'	Summary	Königshofer (yellow card) 36'; Drazan (yellow card) 38'; Heikkinen (yellow card) 76'	Stadium: Stadion Wiener Neustadt; Attendance: 3,050; Referee: Dr. Thomas Prammer

17 February 2013 21	Rapid Wien	1–2	FK Austria Wien	Vienna
16:00	Bošković (yellow card) 17' (yellow card) 29' (red card); Trimmel 20'; Alar (yellow card) 30'; Schimpelsberger (yellow card) 30'		Koch (yellow card) 17' (yellow card) 90+2' (red card); Lindner (yellow card) 20'; Hosiner 27' 54'; Dilaver (yellow card) 90+4'	Stadium: Gerhard Hanappi Stadium; Attendance: 16,711; Referee: Gerhard Grobelnik

24 February 2013 22	FC Red Bull Salzburg	3–3	Rapid Wien	Salzburg
16:00	Kampl 1' (yellow card) 12'; Soriano 69' (pen.); Hinteregger 86'		Schrammel (yellow card) 12' (red card) 68'; Boyd 48' (yellow card) 90'; Pichler (yellow card) 76'; Burgstaller 82'; Gerson (yellow card) 87'; Sabitzer 90+1'; Hofmann (yellow card) 90+4'	Stadium: Red Bull Arena; Attendance: 11,210; Referee: Markus Hameter

27 February 2013 23	Rapid Wien	1–1	Sturm Graz	Vienna
20:30	Heikkinen (yellow card) 16'; Katzer (yellow card) 18'; Bošković 29'; Sonnleitner (yellow card) 52'		Okotie (yellow card) 49'; Vujadinović (yellow card) 54' (goal) 60'; Säumel (yellow card) 62'	Stadium: Gerhard Hanappi Stadium; Attendance: 12,800; Referee: Robert Schörgenhofer

3 March 2013 24	Wolfsberger AC	2–1	Rapid Wien	Wolfsberg
16:00	Topcagić 16'; Thonhofer 35'	Report	Burgstaller 10'	Stadium: Lavanttal-Arena; Attendance: 5,150; Referee: Rene Eisner

9 March 2013 25	Rapid Wien	2–2	SV Mattesburg	Vienna
18:30	Boyd 60'; Alar 67'	Report	Bürger 20'; Gartner 50'	Stadium: Gerhard Hanappi Stadium; Attendance: 11,800; Referee: Alexander Harkam

16 March 2013 26	Rapid Wien	1–1	Admira Wacker Mödling	Vienna
16:00	Pichler 53'	Report	Ouédraogo 57'	Stadium: Gerhard Hanappi Stadium; Attendance: 10,900; Referee: Dominik Ouschan

30 March 2013 27	SV Ried	3–2	Rapid Wien	Ried im Innkreis
18:30	Gartler 5'; Meilinger 45'; Nacho Rodriguez 53'	Report	Alar 9', 90'	Stadium: Keine Sorgen Arena; Attendance: 6,200; Referee: Christian Dintar

6 April 2013 28	Wacker Innsbruck	1–1	Rapid Wien	Innsbruck
16:00	Perstaller 82'	Report	Boyd 66'	Stadium: Tivoli-Neu; Attendance: 5,600; Referee: Dieter Muckenhammer

13 April 2013 29	Rapid Wien	2–0	SC Wiener Neustadt	Vienna
18:30	Katzer 49'; Alar 57'	Report		Stadium: Gerhard Hanappi Stadium; Attendance: 11,000; Referee: Rene Eisner

21 April 2013 30	Austria Wien	2–2	Rapid Wien	Vienna
16:00	Jun 28', 56'	Report	Alar 53'; Sabitzer 66'	Stadium: Generali Arena; Attendance: 12,500; Referee: Alexander Harkam

27 April 2013 31	Rapid Wien	1–3	FC Red Bull Salzburg	Vienna
18:30	Alar 63'	Report	Alan 65', 70'; Svento 90'	Stadium: Gerhard Hanappi Stadium; Attendance: 15,100; Referee: Oliver Drachta

5 May 2013 32	Sturm Graz	1–3	Rapid Wien	Graz
16:00	Hölzl 13'	Report	Sabitzer 7'; Sonnleitner 66'; Starkl 90+2'	Stadium: UPC-Arena; Attendance: 14,268; Referee: Robert Schörgenhofer

11 May 2013 33	Rapid Wien	0–0	Wolfsberger AC	Vienna
18:30		Report		Stadium: Gerhard Hanappi Stadium; Attendance: 13,400; Referee: Markus Hameter

18 May 2013 34	Mattersburg	2–0	Rapid Wien	Mattersburg
18:30	Bürger 53'; Klemen 90+2'	Report		Stadium: Pappelstadion; Attendance: 9,400; Referee: Manuel Schüttengruber

22 May 2013 35	Admira Wacker	0–2	Rapid Wien	Maria Enzersdorf
20:30		Report	Trimmel 5'; Wydra 59'	Stadium: Trenkwalder Arena; Attendance: 4,800; Referee: Oliver Drachta

26 May 2013 36	Rapid Wien	3–0	SV Ried	Vienna
16:00	Schaub 20', 49'; Boyd 88'	Report		Stadium: Gerhard Hanappi Stadium; Attendance: 12,200; Referee: Dominik Ouschan

==== League table ====
===== Overall league table =====
Pos	Team	Pld	W	D	L	GF	GA	GD	Pts	Qualification or relegation
1	Austria Wien (C)	36	25	7	4	84	31	+53	82	Qualification for the Champions League third qualifying round
2	Red Bull Salzburg	36	22	11	3	91	39	+52	77	Qualification for the Champions League third qualifying round
3	Rapid Wien	36	16	9	11	57	39	+18	57	Qualification for the Europa League third qualifying round
4	Sturm Graz	36	13	9	14	49	56	−7	48	Qualification for the Europa League second qualifying round
5	Wolfsberger AC	36	12	11	13	53	56	−3	47	

Source: weltfussball.de (in German)
Rules for classification: 1) points; 2) goal difference; 3) number of goals scored.
(C) Champions

===== Summary table =====
Overall								Home						Away					
Pld	W	D	L	GF	GA	GD	Pts	W	D	L	GF	GA	GD	W	D	L	GF	GA	GD
36	16	9	11	57	39	+18	57	8	6	4	30	19	+11	8	3	7	27	20	+7

Last updated: 23 May 2013.
Source: Bundesliga.at (Home) and Bundesliga.at (Away)

=== ÖFB-Cup ===
15 July 2012 1st Round	SV Heiligenkreuz	0–5	Rapid Wien	Heiligenkreuz
18:00		Report	34' (pen.) Hofmann; 53', 74' Grozurek; 60', 72' Burgstaller	Stadium: Waldstadion; Attendance: 3,500; Referee: R. Eisner

26 September 2012 2nd Round	USV Allerheiligen	1–4	Rapid Wien	Allerheiligen
19:00	Kulnik 47'	Report	Sonnleitner 50'; Alar 78', 90+1'; Dobras 89'	Stadium: Sportplatz Allerheiligen; Attendance: 1,683; Referee: Manfred Krassnitzer

31 October 2012 3rd Round	Rapid Wien	4–2 (a.e.t.)	SC Rheindorf Altach	Vienna
19:30	Sonnleitner 5'; Boyd 73'; Schimpelsberger (yellow card) 75'; Ildiz 104' (yellow card) 106'; Prager 114'	Summary	Schöpf (yellow card) 29'; Aigner 37' (pen.) (yellow card) 56'; Netzer 43'; Erbek (yellow card) 64'	Stadium: Gerhard Hanappi Stadium; Attendance: 3,300; Referee: Thomas Prammer

16 April 2013 Quarter-finals	Rapid Wien	0–1	FC Pasching	Vienna
18:00		Report	Nacho Casanova 61'	Stadium: Gerhard Hanappi Stadium; Attendance: 3,450; Referee: Andreas Kollegger

=== UEFA Europa League ===
==== Third qualifying round ====
2 August 2012 1st Leg	FK Vojvodina (Serbia)	2–1	Rapid Wien	Novi Sad, Serbia
21:00 CET	Skuletic (yellow card) 19'; Oumarou 75'; Jokic (yellow card) 82'; Đurić (yellow card) 83'; Moreira (yellow card) 87'; Bojović 90+4'; Pavlovic (yellow card) 90+6'		Pichler (yellow card) 21'; Trimmel (yellow card) 90+2'; Alar 90+6'	Stadium: Karađorđe Stadium; Attendance: 12,000; Referee: Artyom Kuchin

9 August 2012 2nd Leg	Rapid Wien	2–0 (3–2 agg.)	FK Vojvodina (Serbia)	Vienna, Austria
21:05 CET	Alar (yellow card) 76' (goal) 90+1' (pen.); Boyd (yellow card) 82' (goal) 90+8'		Ajuru (yellow card) 27'; Greene (yellow card) 59'; Pavlovic (red card) 83'; Vulicevic (yellow card) 84'	Stadium: Gerhard Hanappi Stadium; Referee: Robert Malek

==== Playoff round ====
23 August 2012 1st Leg	PAOK (Greece)	2–1	Rapid Wien	Thessaloniki, Greece
20:30 CET	Lazar (yellow card) 52' (yellow card) 74' (red card); Khumalo (yellow card) 56'; Athanasiadis 69'; Salpingidis (yellow card) 80'; Katsikas 83' (yellow card) 84'		Burgstaller (yellow card) 23'; Alar 25'; Schimpelsberger (yellow card) 31'	Stadium: Toumba Stadium; Referee: Marriner

30 August 2012 2nd Leg	Rapid Wien	3–0 (4–2 agg.)	PAOK (Greece)	Vienna, Austria
21:00 CET	Alar 31'; Burgstaller (yellow card) 35'; Boyd 48'; Hofmann 90+3'		Kace (yellow card) 19'; Athanasiadis (yellow card) 86'	Stadium: Gerhard Hanappi Stadium; Attendance: 16,000 (sell-out); Referee: Gomes

==== Group stage ====
===== Group results =====
20 September 2012 1	Rapid Wien (Austria)	1–2	(Norway) Rosenborg	Vienna, Austria
20:05	Katzer 66'	Report	Fredheim Holm (yellow card) 8'; Elyounoussi 18'; Rønning (yellow card) 45'; Dorsin 60'; Gamboa (yellow card) 69'; Svensson (yellow card) 73'	Stadium: Ernst-Happel-Stadion; Attendance: 80; Referee: Stanislav Todorov (Bulgaria)

4 October 2012 2	Metalist Kharkiv (Ukraine)	2–0	(Austria) Rapid Wien	Kharkiv, Ukraine
19:00	Torsiglieri (yellow card) 58'; Edmar 66'; Xavier 80'		Ildiz (yellow card) 90+1'; Burgstaller (red card) 90+3'	Stadium: Metalist Oblast Sports Complex; Referee: Menashe Masiah (Israel)

25 October 2012 3	Rapid Wien (Austria)	0–4	(Germany) Bayer Leverkusen	Vienna, Austria
19:00			Wollscheid 37'; Castro 56', 90'; Schwaab (yellow card) 52'; Bellarabi 58'	Stadium: Ernst-Happel-Stadion; Attendance: 42,600; Referee: Fernando Teixeira Vitienes (Spain)

8 November 2012 4	Bayer Leverkusen (Germany)	3–0	(Austria) Rapid Wien	Leverkusen, Germany
20:05	Hegeler 4'; Carvajal (yellow card) 44'; Schürrle 53'; Friedrich 66'; Reinartz (yellow card) 77'	Summary	Kulovits (yellow card) 45'; Boyd (yellow card) 81'	Stadium: BayArena; Attendance: 19,842; Referee: Libor Kovařík (Czech Republic)

22 November 2012 5	Rosenborg (Norway)	3–2	(Austria) Rapid Wien	Trondheim, Norway
19:00	Chibuike 28'; Svensson (yellow card) 34'; Diskerud (yellow card) 71'; Elyounoussi 76'; Prica 79'		Alar (yellow card) 27'; Schrammel 53'; Pichler (yellow card) 65'; Boyd 66'	Stadium: Lerkendal Stadion; Attendance: 8,320; Referee: Gediminas Mazeika (Lithuania)

6 December 2012 6	Rapid Wien (Austria)	1–0	(Ukraine) Metalist Kharkiv	Vienna, Austria
20:05	Alar 13'; Pichler (red card) 44'; Königshofer (yellow card) 90+2'	Summary	Fininho (yellow card) 35'	Stadium: Ernst-Happel-Stadion; Attendance: 29,400; Referee: Hannes Kaasik (Estonia)

===== Group table =====
====== Final group table ======
Team	Pld	W	D	L	GF	GA	GD	Pts
(Ukraine) Metalist Kharkiv	6	4	1	1	9	3	+6	13
(Germany) Bayer Leverkusen	6	4	1	1	9	2	+7	13
(Norway) Rosenborg BK	6	2	0	4	7	10	−3	6
(Austria) Rapid Wien	6	1	0	5	4	14	−10	3

====== Group table summary ======
Overall								Home						Away					
Pld	W	D	L	GF	GA	GD	Pts	W	D	L	GF	GA	GD	W	D	L	GF	GA	GD
6	1	0	5	4	14	−10	3	1	0	2	2	6	−4	0	0	3	2	8	−6

Last updated: 11 December 2012.
Source: UEFA.com

== Squad ==
=== Squad and statistics ===
As of 28 May 2013

No.	Nat.	Name	Age	League		Cup		Europa League		Total		Discipline	
No.	Nat.	Name	Age	Apps	Goals	Apps	Goals	Apps	Goals	Apps	Goals	Yellow card	Red card
Goalkeepers
1	(Slovakia)	Ján Novota	28	10		4		1		15		1	
31	(Austria)	Lukas Königshofer	23	26				9		35		3	
Defenders
4	(Austria)	Thomas Schrammel	24	16+2		2+1		3+3	1	21+6	1	3	1
6	(Austria)	Mario Sonnleitner	25	34	2	3	2	10		47	4	4	
14	(Austria)	Markus Katzer	32	21+2	2	2		7	1	30+2	3	3	
28	(Austria)	Christopher Trimmel	25	29+2	4	3+1		8+1		40+4	4	12	
35	(Brazil)	Gerson	20	26		2		9		37		4	
36	(Austria)	Michael Schimpelsberger	21	16		2		5+1		23+1		10	
37	(Austria)	Lukas Denner	21	0+1						0+1			
38	(Austria)	Maximilian Hofmann	18	0+1						0+1			
Midfielders
7	(Austria)	Stefan Kulovits	29	14+9	1	4		3+4		21+13	1	10	
8	(Finland)	Markus Heikkinen	33	17+9		1		9		27+9		7	1
11	(Germany)	Steffen Hofmann	31	20	2	2	1	6	1	28	4	2	
21	(Austria)	Louis Schaub	17	6+10	2	1				7+10	2	3	
23	(Austria)	Thomas Prager	26	6+4		2+1	1	3+2		11+7	1	2	1
24	(Austria)	Marcel Sabitzer	18	10+6	3	1				11+6	3	2	
25	(Austria)	Dominik Wydra	18	13+4	1	0+1		2+1		15+6	1	5	
26	(Austria)	Lukas Grozurek	20	8+16	2	2+2	2	2+3		12+21	4	2	
27	(Austria)	Harald Pichler	25	18+4	1	3+1		4		25+5	1	12	1
30	(Austria)	Guido Burgstaller	23	29+3	6	2+2	2	8		39+5	8	12	1
32	(Montenegro)	Branko Boskovic	32	7+3	1					7+3	1	5	1
33	(Austria)	Deni Alar	22	25+6	15	2+1	2	7+2	5	34+9	22	6	
39	(Austria)	Eldis Bajrami	19	0+1						0+1			
Forwards
9	(United States)	Terrence Boyd	21	25+5	13	3	1	6+3	3	34+8	17	12	
34	(Austria)	Dominik Starkl	18	2+6	1					2+6	1		
Players who left after the start of the season
16	(Austria)	Boris Prokopic	24	1+1		1		0+1		2+2			
17	(Austria)	Kristijan Dobras	19	0+1		1	1			1+1	1		
19	(Austria)	Christopher Drazan	21	5+4	1			3+2		8+6	1	2	
20	(Austria)	Muhammed Ildiz	21	12+3		1+1	1	5		18+4	1	6	

=== Goal scorers ===
Rank	Name	Bundesliga	Cup	Europa League	Total
1	(Austria) Deni Alar	15	2	5	22
2	(United States) Terrence Boyd	13	1	3	17
3	(Austria) Guido Burgstaller	6	2		8
4	(Austria) Lukas Grozurek	2	2		4
4	(Germany) Steffen Hofmann	2	1	1	4
4	(Austria) Mario Sonnleitner	2	2		4
4	(Austria) Christopher Trimmel	4			4
8	(Austria) Markus Katzer	2		1	3
8	(Austria) Marcel Sabitzer	3			3
10	(Austria) Louis Schaub	2			2
11	(Montenegro) Branko Boskovic	1			1
11	(Austria) Kristijan Dobras		1		1
11	(Austria) Christopher Drazan	1			1
11	(Austria) Muhammed Ildiz		1		1
11	(Austria) Stefan Kulovits	1			1
11	(Austria) Harald Pichler	1			1
11	(Austria) Thomas Prager		1		1
11	(Austria) Thomas Schrammel			1	1
11	(Austria) Dominik Starkl	1			1
11	(Austria) Dominik Wydra	1			1
Totals		57	13	11	81

=== Transfers ===
==== Summer ====
In:

Out:

No.	Pos.	Nation	Player
35	DF	BRA	Gerson (on loan from Kapfenberger SV)
20	MF	AUT	Muhammed Ildiz (loan return from Wacker Innsbruck)
9	FW	USA	Terrence Boyd (from Borussia Dortmund II)

No.	Pos.	Nation	Player
24	GK	AUT	Helge Payer (to AEL Kalloni)
3	DF	AUT	Jürgen Patocka (to Austria Lustenau)
22	DF	NOR	Ragnvald Soma (to FC Nordsjælland)
6	DF	AUT	Christian Thonhofer (to Wolfsberger AC)
15	FW	AUT	Atdhe Nuhiu (on loan to Eskişehirspor)
20	FW	AUT	Rene Gartler (to SV Ried)

==== Winter ====
In:

Out:

No.	Pos.	Nation	Player
24	MF	AUT	Marcel Sabitzer (from Admira Wacker Mödling)
32	MF	MNE	Branko Bošković (from D.C. United)

No.	Pos.	Nation	Player
3	DF	GER	Brian Behrendt (on loan to SV Horn)
16	MF	AUT	Boris Prokopič (to SCR Altach)
17	MF	AUT	Kristijan Dobras (on loan to SV Grödig)
19	MF	AUT	Christopher Drazan (to 1. FC Kaiserslautern)
20	MF	AUT	Muhammed Ildiz (to 1. FC Nürnberg)
22	GK	AUT	Thomas Dau (to SV Mattersburg)
