= 2012–13 SV Ried season =

SV Ried
2012–13 season
- Chairman: Johann Willminger
- Manager: Paul Gludovatz
- Stadium: Keine Sorgen Arena, Ried, Upper Austria
- ÖFB-Cup: Entering into 1st Round
- Europa League: Entering into Second qualifying round

The 2012–13 SV Ried season is the 112th season in club history.

== Matches ==
=== Legend ===
Win Draw Loss Postponed

=== Bundesliga ===
==== League results and fixtures ====
22 July 2012 1	Admira Wacker Mödling	0–2	SV Ried	Maria Enzersdorf
16:00	Sulimani (yellow card) 46'; Drescher (yellow card) 66'; Windbichler (yellow card) 77' (yellow-red card) 89'; Mevoungou (yellow card) 89'; Schrott (yellow card) 90+3'	Report	14', 19' Gartler; (yellow card) 87' Schicker	Stadium: Trenkwalder Arena; Attendance: 2.400; Referee: Christian Dintar

29 July 2012 2	SV Ried	0–2	Wolfsberger AC	Ried im Innkreis
18:30 CET	Reiter (yellow card) 26'; Iván Carril (yellow card) 66'	Report	Solano 50'; Liendl 64'; Jacobo (yellow card) 66'; Mihret Topcagić (yellow card) 80'; Dobnik (yellow card) 82'; Manuel Kerhe (yellow card) 84'	Stadium: Keine Sorgen Arena; Attendance: 4,900; Referee: (Austria) Harald Lechner

5 August 2012 3	SV Ried	2–0	Wacker Innsbruck	Ried
16:00	Nacho Rodríguez (yellow card) 33'; Hadžić 68'; Hinum (yellow card) 69'; Markus Grössinger (yellow card) 83'; Guillem 85'	Summary	Schütz (yellow card) 44'; Hauser (yellow card) 58'; Kofler (yellow card) 88'	Stadium: Keine Sorgen Arena; Attendance: 4,453; Referee: Manfred Krassnitzer

12 August 2012 4	SC Wiener Neustadt	2–3	SV Ried	Wiener Neustadt
16:00	Tadić 14'; Lenko (yellow card) 74'; Friesenbichler 90'	Summary	Žulj 17'; Markus Grössinger (yellow card) 38'; Gartler (yellow card) 52' (goal) 66'; Reiter 73'	Stadium: Stadion Wiener Neustadt; Attendance: 1,400; Referee: Alexander Harkam

19 August 2012 5	SV Ried	0–1	Austria Wien	Ried
16:00	Hadžić (yellow card) 13'; Schicker (yellow card) 72'	Summary	Šimkovič (yellow card) 24'; Holland (yellow card) 37'; Grünwald 84' (yellow card) 85'	Stadium: Keine Sorgen Arena; Attendance: 4,100; Referee: Markus Hameter

25 August 2012 6	SV Mattersburg	2–1	SV Ried	Mattersburg
18:30	Potzmann 17'; Bürger 45+1'; Mravac (yellow card) 56'; Farkas (yellow card) 58'	Summary	Iván Carril (yellow card) 58'; Reifeltshammer (yellow card) 81'; Hadžić 90+1' (red card) 90+2'	Stadium: Pappelstadion; Attendance: 2,000; Referee: Dominik Ouschan

1 September 2012 7	SV Ried	0–1	Sturm Graz	Ried
18:30		Summary	Reifeltshammer 46' (o.g.); Vujadinović (yellow card) 59'	Stadium: Keine Sorgen Arena; Attendance: 5,100; Referee: Christian Dintar

15 September 2012 8	Red Bull Salzburg	1–1	SV Ried	Salzburg
18:30	Vorsah (red card) 5'; Kampl (yellow card) 30'; Jonathan Soriano 34'	Summary	Hadžić (yellow card) 8'; Ziegl 70'; Schicker (yellow card) 76'	Stadium: Red Bull Arena; Attendance: 8,500; Referee: Gerhard Grobelnik

23 September 2012 9	SV Ried	0–2	Rapid Wien	Ried
16:30	Ziegl (yellow card) 32'; Reifeltshammer (yellow card) 36'; Reiter (yellow card) 43'	Summary	Burgstaller 31' (yellow card) 77'; Kulovits (yellow card) 51'; Grozurek (yellow card) 60'; Schrammel (yellow card) 68'; Trimmel 84'	Stadium: Keine Sorgen Arena; Attendance: 5,829; Referee: Robert Schörgenhofer

29 September 2012 10	SV Ried	1–1	Admira	Ried
18:30	Walch (yellow card) 38'; Riegler (yellow card) 63'; Reifeltshammer (yellow card) 63'; Žulj 88'	Summary	Pöllhuber (yellow card) 22'; Schick (yellow card) 39'; Schachner (yellow card) 41'; Schwab 64' (pen.)	Stadium: Keine Sorgen Arena; Attendance: 4,457; Referee: Dominik Ouschan

6 October 2012 11	Wolfsberger AC	2–5	SV Ried	Wolfsberg, Carinthia
16:00	de Paula (yellow card) 43'; Jovanović (yellow card) 45'; Jacobo (yellow card) 52'; Rubén Rivera Corral 88'; Liendl 90+1'	Summary	Meilinger 8'; Gartler 50', 56'; Walch 54'; Hadžić (yellow card) 58'; Hammerer 76'	Stadium: Lavanttal-Arena; Attendance: 5,232; Referee: Harald Lechner

20 October 2012 12	Wacker Innsbruck	1–0	SV Ried	Innsbruck
18:30	Carlos Merino (yellow card) 31'; Schreter 41'; Schütz (red card) 82'; Sascha Wörgetter (yellow card) 84'	Summary	Hadžić (yellow card) 30'; Žulj (yellow card) 45'; Ziegl (yellow card) 68'; Gartler (yellow card) 90+3'	Stadium: Tivoli-Neu; Attendance: 4,750; Referee: Markus Hameter

27 October 2012 13	SV Ried	3–1	Wiener Neustadt	Ried
16:00	Žulj 5'; Ziegl (yellow card) 8'; Hadžić (yellow card) 31' (goal) 63'; Riegler (yellow card) 69'; Nacho Rodríguez 90'	Summary	Fröschl 28'; Lenko (red card) 61'; Mimm (yellow card) 69'; Wallner (yellow card) 82'	Stadium: Keine Sorgen Arena; Attendance: 4,041; Referee: Rene Eisner

4 November 2012 14	Austria Wien	6–1	SV Ried	Vienna
16:00	Hosiner 11', 52', 70' (yellow card) 63'; Jun 18'; Koch (yellow card) 71'; Rogulj (yellow card) 80'; Stanković 82'; Linz 87'	Summary	Žulj 57' (yellow card) 63'; Walch (yellow card) 66'	Stadium: Franz Horr Stadium; Attendance: 8,622; Referee: Alexander Harkam

10 November 2012 15	SV Ried	6–1	SV Mattersburg	Ried
18:30	Gartler 4', 13', 26'; Walch 38', 84'; Žulj 47'; Meilinger (yellow card) 70'; Reifeltshammer (yellow card) 79'	Summary	Rodler 31' (yellow card) 35'; Röcher (yellow card) 39'; Steiner (yellow card) 75'; Lovin (yellow card) 83'	Stadium: Keine Sorgen Arena; Attendance: 4,200; Referee: Manfred Krassnitzer

17 November 2012 16	Sturm Graz	3–1	SV Ried	Graz
18:30	Okotie 13', 77'; Weber (yellow card) 16'; Szabics 25'; Kainz (yellow card) 27'; Kainz (yellow card) 43'; Dudić (yellow card) 78'	Summary	Ziegl (yellow card) 18'; Gartler 36'; Riegler (yellow card) 86'	Stadium: UPC-Arena; Attendance: 11,899; Referee: Harald Lechner

24 November 2012 17	SV Ried	3–1	Red Bull Salzburg	Ried
18:30	Walch 32' (yellow card) 70'; Hammerer 76' (yellow card) 78'; Ignacio Rodríguez Ortiz (yellow card) 88'; Hadžić 90+1' (pen.)	Summary	Teigl 5'; Ilsanker (yellow card) 42'; Schiemer (yellow card) 79'; Leitgeb (yellow card) 90'	Stadium: Keine Sorgen Arena; Attendance: 5,900; Referee: Gerhard Grobelnik

1 December 2012 18	Rapid Wien	4–3	SV Ried	Vienna
18:30	Trimmel (yellow card) 12'; Boyd 25'; Alar 45', 58' (pen.), 80' (yellow card) 61'; Pichler (yellow card) 73'; Sonnleitner (yellow card) 84'; Drazan (yellow card) 90+4'	Summary	Gartler 34'; Žulj (yellow card) 38'; Ziegl (yellow card) 57'; Riegler (yellow card) 60'; Hadžić 85' (pen.) (yellow card) 90+2'; Markus Grössinger 90+1'; Gebauer (yellow card) 90+2'; Reifeltshammer (red card) 90+2'	Stadium: Gerhard Hanappi Stadium; Attendance: 12,936; Referee: Alexander Harkam

8 December 2012 19	Admira	0–3	SV Ried	Maria Enzersdorf
16:00	Toth (yellow card) 7'; Thürauer (yellow card) 28'; Drescher (yellow card) 75'; Schwab (yellow card) 79'; Schicker (yellow card) 87'	Summary	Meilinger 2' (yellow card) 86'; Žulj 20'; Gartler 41'	Stadium: Bundesstadion Südstadt; Attendance: 1,650; Referee: Christian Dintar

15 December 2012 20	SV Ried	–	Wolfsberger AC	Ried
16:00				Stadium: Keine Sorgen Arena

==== League table ====
===== Overall league table =====
Pos	Team	Pld	W	D	L	GF	GA	GD	Pts	Qualification or relegation
4	Sturm Graz	36	13	9	14	49	56	−7	48	Qualification for the Europa League second qualifying round
5	Wolfsberger AC	36	12	11	13	53	56	−3	47	
6	SV Ried	36	13	7	16	60	59	+1	46	
7	Wiener Neustadt	36	9	9	18	32	60	−28	36	
8	Wacker Innsbruck	36	11	3	22	41	75	−34	36	

Source: weltfussball.de (in German)
Rules for classification: 1) points; 2) goal difference; 3) number of goals scored.

=== ÖFB-Cup ===
14 July 2012 1st Round	FC Kufstein	1–4	SV Ried	Kufstein
19:00	Crnkic 57'	Match Report	41', 68' (pen.) Gartler; 63' Hadžić; 76' Schicker	Stadium: Kufstein Arena; Attendance: 500; Referee: D. Ouschan

26 September 2012 2nd Round	Union St. Florian	1–1 (a.e.t.) (4–5 p)	SV Ried	St. Florian
19:00	Roland Hinterreiter 67'; Markus Hermes (yellow card) 95'; Dominik Winkler (yellow card) 103'	Summary	Reifeltshammer 54'; Hadžić (yellow card) 66' (yellow-red card); Hinum (yellow card) 76'; Gernot Trauner (yellow card) 86'; Schreiner (yellow card) 110'	Stadium: Sportpark St. Florian; Attendance: 1,500; Referee: Andreas Feichtinger

30 October 2012 3rd Round	Wiener Viktoria	0–1	SV Ried	Vienna
20:30	Umit Erbay (yellow card) 58'	Summary	Nacho Rodríguez (yellow card) 39'; Meilinger 44'; Žulj (yellow card) 84'	Stadium: Sportclub-Platz; Attendance: 700; Referee: Christian Dintar

=== UEFA Europa League ===
==== Qualifying rounds ====
===== Second qualifying round =====
19 July 2012 1st Leg	Shakhtyor Soligorsk (Belarus)	1–1	(Austria) SV Ried	Salihorsk, Belarus
18:30	Grenkow (yellow card) 41'; Dimitry Osipenko 44' (yellow card) 63'; Kolomyts (yellow card) 45+2'	Report	(yellow card) 28' Hinum; (yellow card) 45+1' Reiter; 70' (pen.) (yellow card) 81' Hadžić	Stadium: Stroitel Stadium; Attendance: 3.370; Referee: O. Hațegan

26 July 2012 2nd Leg	SV Ried (Austria)	0–0 (1–1 agg.)	(Belarus) Shakhtyor Soligorsk	Ried, Austria
19:00 CET	Reifeltshammer (yellow card) 36'; Schreiner (yellow card) 90+3'	Report	Razhkow (yellow card) 90+3'	Stadium: Keine Sorgen Arena; Attendance: 4,100; Referee: (Sweden) Michael Lerjeus

===== Third qualifying round =====
2 August 2012 1st Leg	SV Ried (Austria)	2–1	(Poland) Legia Warsaw	Ried, Austria
19:00 CET				Stadium: Keine Sorgen Arena

8 August 2012 2nd Leg	Legia Warsaw (Poland)	3–1 (4–3 agg.)	(Austria) SV Ried	Warsaw, Poland
				Stadium: Polish Army Stadium
