= 2011–12 SK Rapid Wien season =

Rapid Wien
2011–12 season
- President: Rudolf Edlinger
- Coach: Peter Schöttel
- Stadium: Gerhard Hanappi Stadium, Vienna, Austria
- Bundesliga: 2nd
- ÖFB-Cup: 3rd Round
- Top goalscorer: League: Deni Alar (9); All: Hamdi Salihi (11)
- Highest home attendance: 31,800
- Lowest home attendance: 150

The 2011–12 SK Rapid Wien season was the 114th season in club history.

== Squad statistics ==
| No. | Nat. | Name | Age | League | | Cup | | Total | | Discipline | |
| No. | Nat. | Name | Age | Apps | Goals | Apps | Goals | Apps | Goals | Booked | Sent off (straight red) |
Goalkeepers
| 1 | (Slovakia) | Ján Novota | 27 | 5+1 | | 2 | | 7+1 | | | |
| 24 | (Austria) | Helge Payer | 31 | 11+1 | | 1 | | 12+1 | | 2 | |
| 31 | (Austria) | Lukas Königshofer | 22 | 20 | | | | 20 | | | |
Defenders
| 3 | (Austria) | Jürgen Patocka | 33 | 5+1 | 1 | 2 | | 7+1 | 1 | 1 | |
| 4 | (Austria) | Thomas Schrammel | 23 | 12+1 | | 1 | | 13+1 | | 2 | |
| 6 | (Austria) | Mario Sonnleitner | 24 | 31 | 1 | 3 | | 34 | 1 | 2 | |
| 14 | (Austria) | Markus Katzer | 31 | 26+1 | 1 | 3 | | 29+1 | 1 | 3 | |
| 17 | (Austria) | Christian Thonhofer | 26 | 9+7 | | 1 | | 10+7 | | 2 | |
| 22 | (Norway) | Ragnvald Soma | 31 | 14 | | | | 14 | | | |
| 27 | (Austria) | Harald Pichler | 24 | 27+1 | 1 | 1 | | 28+1 | 1 | 12 | |
| 36 | (Austria) | Michael Schimpelsberger | 20 | 24+2 | | 2 | | 26+2 | | 6 | 1 |
Midfielders
| 7 | (Austria) | Stefan Kulovits | 28 | 10+8 | | 2 | | 12+8 | | 6 | |
| 8 | (Finland) | Markus Heikkinen | 32 | 27+2 | | 1 | | 28+2 | | 11 | |
| 11 | (Germany) | Steffen Hofmann | 30 | 32 | 6 | 2 | | 34 | 6 | 4 | |
| 16 | (Austria) | Boris Prokopic | 23 | 9+4 | 2 | 1+1 | | 10+5 | 2 | 1 | 1 |
| 19 | (Austria) | Christopher Drazan | 20 | 20+11 | 2 | 2 | 1 | 22+11 | 3 | 11 | 2 |
| 23 | (Austria) | Thomas Prager | 25 | 17+6 | | 1+1 | | 18+7 | | 6 | 1 |
| 25 | (Austria) | Dominik Wydra | 17 | 1+1 | | | | 1+1 | | | |
| 26 | (Austria) | Lukas Grozurek | 19 | 8+5 | 1 | | | 8+5 | 1 | 1 | |
| 28 | (Austria) | Christopher Trimmel | 24 | 25+2 | 4 | 1 | | 26+2 | 4 | 5 | 1 |
Forwards
| 15 | (Austria) | Atdhe Nuhiu | 21 | 10+21 | 8 | 1+1 | 1 | 11+22 | 9 | 9 | |
| 20 | (Austria) | René Gartler | 25 | 7+9 | 3 | 1+1 | 2 | 8+10 | 5 | 1 | |
| 30 | (Austria) | Guido Burgstaller | 22 | 21+2 | 7 | 1+1 | | 22+3 | 7 | 9 | 1 |
| 33 | (Austria) | Deni Alar | 21 | 20+9 | 9 | 0+1 | | 20+10 | 9 | 4 | |
Players who left after the start of the season
| 9 | (Albania) | Hamdi Salihi | 27 | 4+8 | 3 | 3 | 8 | 7+8 | 11 | 1 | |
| 21 | (Austria) | Christoph Saurer | 25 | 1 | | 1+1 | | 2+1 | | 1 | |

=== Goal scorers ===
| Rank | Name | Bundesliga | Cup | Total |
|---|---|---|---|---|
| 1 | (Albania) Hamdi Salihi | 3 | 8 | 11 |
| 2 | (Austria) Deni Alar | 9 | | 9 |
| 2 | (Austria) Atdhe Nuhiu | 8 | 1 | 9 |
| 4 | (Austria) Guido Burgstaller | 7 | | 7 |
| 5 | (Germany) Steffen Hofmann | 6 | | 6 |
| 6 | (Austria) Rene Gartler | 3 | 2 | 5 |
| 7 | (Austria) Christopher Trimmel | 4 | | 4 |
| 8 | (Austria) Christopher Drazan | 2 | 1 | 3 |
| 9 | (Austria) Boris Prokopic | 2 | | 2 |
| 10 | (Austria) Lukas Grozurek | 1 | | 1 |
| 10 | (Austria) Markus Katzer | 1 | | 1 |
| 10 | (Austria) Jürgen Patocka | 1 | | 1 |
| 10 | (Austria) Harald Pichler | 1 | | 1 |
| 10 | (Austria) Mario Sonnleitner | 1 | | 1 |
| OG | (Slovenia) Matej Mavric (Kapfenberg) | 1 | | 1 |
| OG | (Cameroon) Patrick Mevoungou (Admira) | 1 | | 1 |
| OG | (Austria) Rene Seebacher (Admira) | 1 | | 1 |
| Totals | | 52 | 12 | 64 |

== Fixtures and results ==
Win Draw Loss

=== Bundesliga ===
| Rd | Date | Venue | Opponent | Res. | Att. | Goals and discipline |
|---|---|---|---|---|---|---|
| 1 | 16.07.2011 | H | Admira | 2–0 | 150 | Salihi 67', Nuhiu 90+1' |
| 2 | 23.07.2011 | A | Wiener Neustadt | 2–0 | 6,100 | Nuhiu 90+2', Drazan 90+4' |
| 3 | 31.07.2011 | H | Ried | 0–0 | 15,200 | |
| 4 | 13.08.2011 | A | Sturm Graz | 0–1 | 13,931 | |
| 5 | 21.08.2011 | H | Austria Wien | 0–3 | 31,800 | Prokopic (red card) 86' |
| 6 | 28.08.2011 | A | RB Salzburg | 0–0 | 15,500 | |
| 7 | 10.09.2011 | H | Mattersburg | 1–1 | 15,200 | Trimmel 55' |
| 8 | 17.09.2011 | H | Kapfenberg | 5–1 | 14,800 | Mavrič 13' (o.g.), Trimmel 27', Gartler R. 59', Hofmann S. 78' (pen.), Salihi 90+2' |
| 9 | 24.09.2011 | A | Wacker Innsbruck | 3–0 | 8,073 | Hofmann S. 22' (pen.), Gartler R. 43', Alar 48' |
| 10 | 01.10.2011 | A | Admira | 3–4 | 10,600 | Patocka 60', Hofmann S. 68' (pen.), Salihi 79' |
| 11 | 15.10.2011 | H | Wiener Neustadt | 1–1 | 15,300 | Drazan 9' |
| 12 | 23.10.2011 | A | Austria Wien | 1–1 | 12,000 | Burgstaller G. 45' |
| 13 | 29.10.2011 | H | Sturm Graz | 3–2 | 17,000 | Trimmel 55', Nuhiu 72' 75' |
| 14 | 05.11.2011 | A | Ried | 1–1 | 7,300 | Trimmel 24' |
| 15 | 20.11.2011 | H | RB Salzburg | 4–2 | 17,500 | Katzer 5', Burgstaller G. 34' 75' 79' |
| 16 | 26.11.2011 | A | Mattersburg | 2–1 | 9,200 | Nuhiu 68', Hofmann S. 78'; Drazan (yellow card) 83' (red card) |
| 17 | 03.12.2011 | A | Kapfenberg | 0–0 | 3,500 | |
| 18 | 10.12.2011 | H | Wacker Innsbruck | 0–0 | 15,300 | |
| 19 | 17.12.2011 | H | Admira | 2–1 | 14,000 | Nuhiu 5', Alar 78' |
| 20 | 12.02.2012 | A | Wiener Neustadt | 0–0 | 3,500 | |
| 21 | 18.02.2012 | H | Austria Wien | 0–0 | 29,400 | |
| 22 | 25.02.2012 | A | Sturm Graz | 0–0 | 14,251 | |
| 23 | 03.03.2012 | H | Ried | 1–0 | 16,200 | Pichler H. 51'; Trimmel (red card) 42' |
| 24 | 10.03.2012 | A | RB Salzburg | 1–3 | 19,500 | Hofmann S. 74'; Burgstaller G. (yellow card) 89' (red card) |
| 25 | 17.03.2012 | H | Mattersburg | 1–1 | 15,500 | Hofmann S. 83' |
| 26 | 21.03.2012 | H | Kapfenberg | 3–0 | 13,300 | Alar 45' 60', Gartler R. 90+3' |
| 27 | 25.03.2012 | A | Wacker Innsbruck | 1–2 | 10,200 | Nuhiu 60' |
| 28 | 31.03.2012 | A | Admira | 4–0 | 8,000 | Mevoungou 22' (o.g.), Alar 72', Seebacher 85' (o.g.), Prokopic 90' |
| 29 | 07.04.2012 | H | Wiener Neustadt | 2–1 | 14,800 | Prokopic 14', Nuhiu 64' |
| 30 | 15.04.2012 | A | Austria Wien | 0–0 | 12,219 | |
| 31 | 22.04.2012 | H | Sturm Graz | 1–1 | 17,300 | Burgstaller G. 13' |
| 32 | 29.04.2012 | A | Ried | 3–2 | 7,300 | Alar 12' 51', Burgstaller G. 19'; Prager (yellow card) 89' (red card) |
| 33 | 06.05.2012 | H | RB Salzburg | 0–1 | 17,500 | |
| 34 | 10.05.2012 | A | Mattersburg | 1–0 | 7,200 | Burgstaller G. 18' |
| 35 | 13.05.2012 | A | Kapfenberg | 2–0 | 4,500 | Grozurek 7', Sonnleitner 75' |
| 36 | 17.05.2012 | H | Wacker Innsbruck | 2–0 | 17,100 | Alar 37' 90' |

==== League table ====
| Pos | Team | Pld | W | D | L | GF | GA | GD | Pts | Qualification or relegation |
|---|---|---|---|---|---|---|---|---|---|---|
| 1 | Red Bull Salzburg (C) | 36 | 19 | 11 | 6 | 60 | 30 | +30 | 68 | Qualification to Champions League second qualifying round |
| 2 | Rapid Wien | 36 | 16 | 14 | 6 | 52 | 30 | +22 | 62 | Qualification to Europa League third qualifying round (Note: Since 2011–12 Austrian Cup winners Red Bull Salzburg qualified for the 2012–13 UEFA Champions League, so cup runners-up Ried qualified for the 2012–13 UEFA Europa League second qualifying round. Moreover, Rapid Wien were moved up a round as the cup winner spot was not used.) |
| 3 | Admira Wacker Mödling | 36 | 15 | 10 | 11 | 59 | 52 | +7 | 55 | Qualification to Europa League second qualifying round |
| 4 | Austria Wien | 36 | 14 | 12 | 10 | 52 | 44 | +8 | 54 | |
| 5 | Sturm Graz | 36 | 12 | 15 | 9 | 47 | 41 | +6 | 51 | |

Source: weltfussball.de (in German)
Rules for classification: 1) points; 2) goal difference; 3) number of goals scored.
(C) Champions

=== Cup ===
| Rd | Date | Venue | Opponent | Res. | Att. | Goals and discipline |
|---|---|---|---|---|---|---|
| R1 | 06.08.2011 | A | LASK II | 7–0 | 1,000 | Salihi 24' 31' 47' 53' 62', Gartler R. 33' 83' |
| R2 | 21.09.2011 | A | Bad Vöslau | 4–1 | 2,900 | Salihi 10' 11' (pen.) 71', Nuhiu 30' |
| R16 | 26.10.2011 | H | Ried | 1–2 (a.e.t.) | 6,500 | Drazan 19'; Drazan (yellow card) 100' (red card) , Schimpelsberger (yellow card) 116' (red card) |
