= Clemens Walch =

Austrian footballer (born 1987)

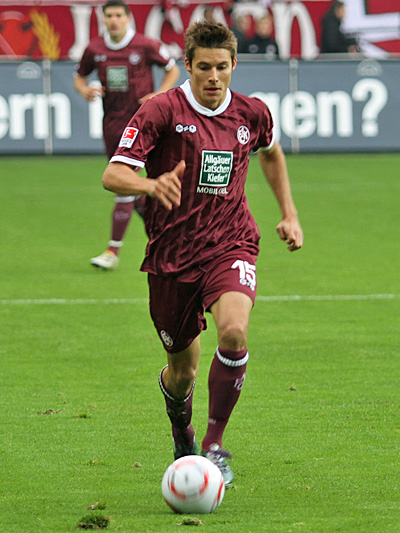

Personal information
- Date of birth: 10 July 1987 (age 39)
- Place of birth: Rum, Austria
- Height: 1.80 m (5 ft 11 in)
- Position: Right midfielder

Team information
- Current team: SPG Silz/Mötz

Youth career
- SU Inzing
- –2006: BNZ Tirol

Senior career*
| Years | Team | Apps | (Gls) |
| 2007–2008 | Red Bull Salzburg II | 19 | (3) |
| 2008–2010 | VfB Stuttgart II | 49 | (8) |
| 2009–2010 | VfB Stuttgart | 2 | (0) |
| 2010–2012 | 1. FC Kaiserslautern | 17 | (0) |
| 2012 | → Dynamo Dresden (loan) | 5 | (0) |
| 2012–2018 | SV Ried | 147 | (21) |
| 2018–2020 | WSG Swarovski Tirol | 27 | (6) |
| 2020– | SPG Silz/Mötz | 0 | (0) |

International career
| | Austria U-20 | 4 | (0) |
- * Club domestic league appearances and goals as of 4 July 2020

Clemens Walch (born 10 July 1987) is an Austrian footballer who plays for SPG Silz/Mötz as a right midfielder.

== Club career ==
He signed a professional contract with VfB Stuttgart until 2011.

On 12 August 2010 Walch moved to 1. FC Kaiserslautern. After a year and a half with Kaiserslautern, he was loaned to Dynamo Dresden., before leaving the club permanently six months later, to return to his homeland with SV Ried.

== Career statistics ==
| Club performance | | | League | | Cup | | Continental | | Total | | Ref. |
| Club | League | Season | Apps | Goals | Apps | Goals | Apps | Goals | Apps | Goals | Ref. |
| Austria | | | League | | Austrian Cup | | Europe | | Total | | Ref. |
|---|---|---|---|---|---|---|---|---|---|---|---|
| Red Bull Salzburg (A) | First League | 2007–08 | 24 | 4 | — | | | | 24 | 4 | |
| Germany | | | League | | DFB-Pokal | | Europe | | Total | | Ref. |
| VfB Stuttgart II | 3. Liga | 2008–09 | 20 | 4 | — | | | | 20 | 4 | |
| VfB Stuttgart II | 3. Liga | 2009–10 | 29 | 4 | — | | | | 29 | 4 | |
| VfB Stuttgart II totals | | | 49 | 8 | — | | | | 49 | 8 | — |
| VfB Stuttgart | Bundesliga | 2009–10 | 2 | 0 | 0 | 0 | 0 | 0 | 2 | 0 | |
| 1. FC Kaiserslautern II | Regionalliga West | 2010–11 | 9 | 0 | — | | | | 9 | 0 | |
| 1. FC Kaiserslautern | Bundesliga | 2010–11 | 12 | 0 | 1 | 0 | 0 | 0 | 13 | 0 | |
| 1. FC Kaiserslautern | Bundesliga | 2011–12 | 5 | 0 | 0 | 0 | — | | 5 | 0 | |
| 1. FC Kaiserslautern totals | | | 17 | 0 | 1 | 0 | 0 | 0 | 18 | 0 | — |
| Dynamo Dresden | 2. Bundesliga | 2011–12 | 2 | 0 | 0 | 0 | — | | 2 | 0 | |
| Austria | | | League | | Austrian Cup | | Europe | | Total | | Ref. |
| Ried | Bundesliga | 2012–13 | 27 | 5 | 4 | 0 | 1 | 0 | 32 | 5 | |
| Ried | Bundesliga | 2013–14 | 26 | 5 | 3 | 1 | — | | 29 | 6 | |
| Ried | Bundesliga | 2014–15 | 13 | 2 | 1 | 0 | — | | 14 | 2 | |
| Ried totals | | | 66 | 12 | 8 | 1 | 1 | 0 | 75 | 13 | — |
| Career totals | | | 169 | 24 | 9 | 1 | 1 | 0 | 179 | 25 | — |
Last updated: 10 November 2014
