= Parties in the European Council during 2000 =

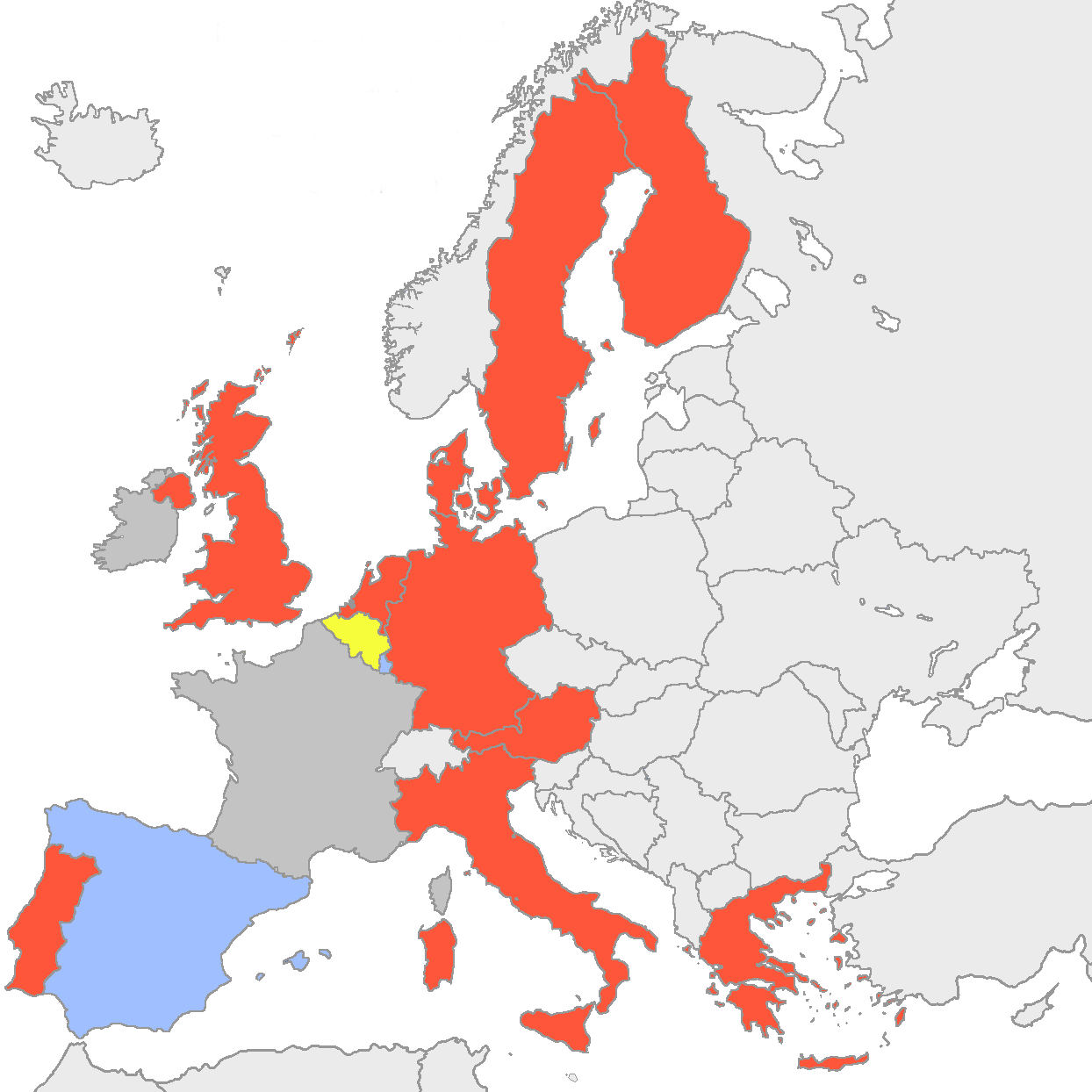
The member-states of the European Union by the European party affiliations of their leaders, as of 1 January 2000.

This article describes the party affiliations of the leaders of each member-state represented in the European Council during the year 2000. The list below gives the political party that each head of government, or head of state, belonged to at the national level, as well as the European political alliance to which that national party belonged. The states are listed from most to least populous. More populous states have greater influence in the council, in accordance with the system of Qualified Majority Voting.

== Summary ==
Party	1 January 2000		4 February 2000		25 April 2000
Party	#	QMV	#	QMV	#	QMV
Party of European Socialists	10	59	9	55	8	45
Independent	2	13	2	13	3	23
European People's Party	2	10	3	14	3	14
European Liberal Democrat and Reform Party	1	5	1	5	1	5

== List of leaders (January 1, 2000) ==
Member-state	Votes	Leader	National party	European party
Germany	10	Gerhard Schröder	SPD	PES
France	10	Jacques Chirac	RPR	Independent
United Kingdom	10	Tony Blair	Lab	PES
Italy	10	Massimo D'Alema	DS	PES
Spain	8	José María Aznar	PP	EPP
Netherlands	5	Wim Kok	PvdA	PES
Greece	5	Costas Simitis	PA.SO.K.	PES
Belgium	5	Guy Verhofstadt	VLD	ELDR
Portugal	5	António Guterres	PS	PES
Sweden	4	Göran Persson	SAP	PES
Austria	4	Viktor Klima	SPÖ	PES
Denmark	3	Poul Nyrup Rasmussen	A	PES
Finland	3	Paavo Lipponen	SDP	PES
Ireland	3	Bertie Ahern	FF	Independent
Luxembourg	2	Jean-Claude Juncker	CSV	EPP

== Changes ==
=== Affiliation ===
Date	Member-state	Leader	National party	European party
4 February	Austria	Wolfgang Schüssel	ÖVP	EPP
25 April	Italy	Giuliano Amato	Independent

== See also ==
- Presidency of the Council of the European Union
