= Kristijan Dobras =

Austrian footballer

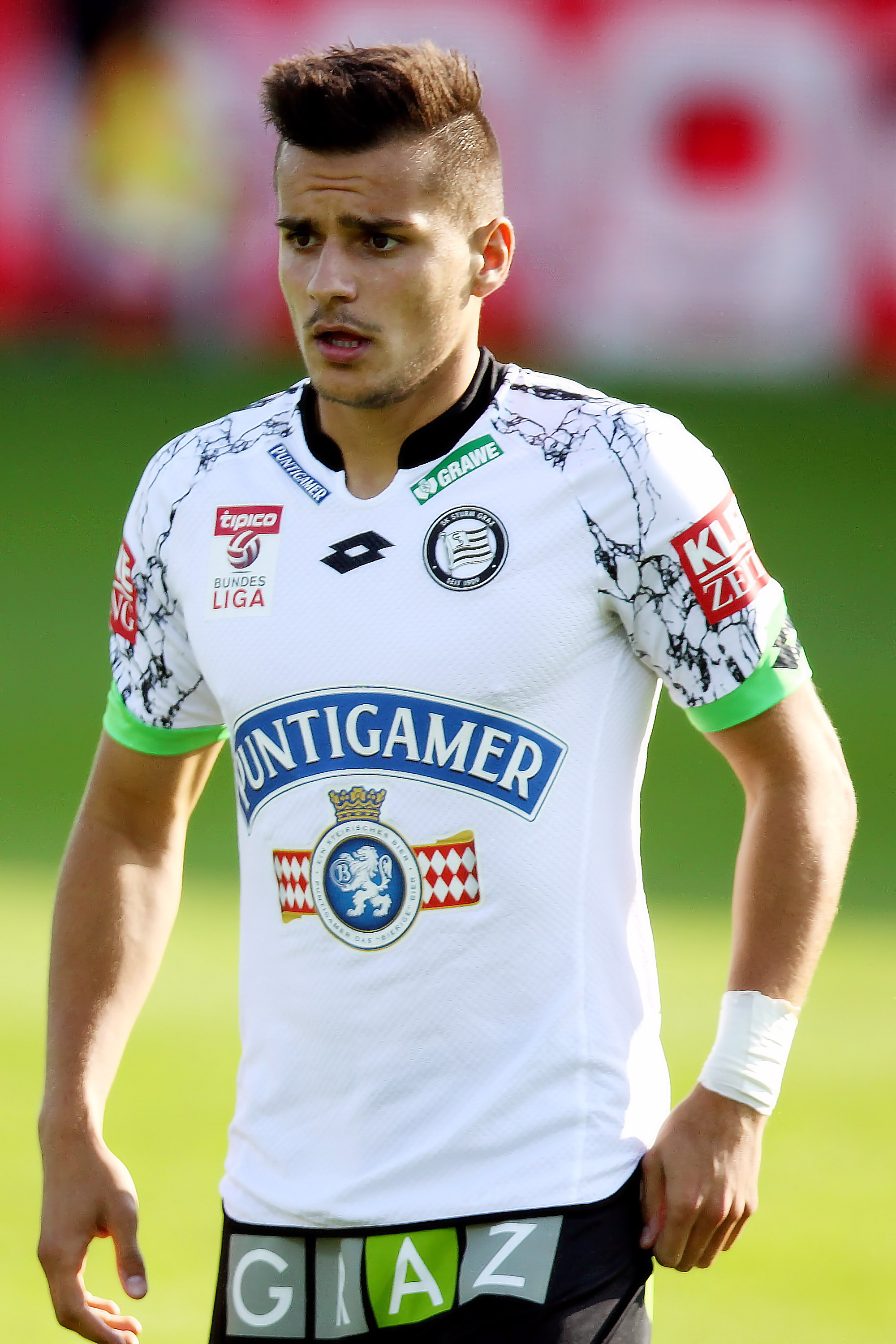
- Dobras playing for Sturm Graz in 2015

Personal information
- Date of birth: 9 October 1992 (age 34)
- Place of birth: Steyr, Austria
- Height: 1.73 m (5 ft 8 in)
- Position: Midfielder

Team information
- Current team: Blau-Weiß Linz
- Number: 30

Youth career
- 1996–2004: SU Wolfern
- 2004–2007: Vorwärts Steyr
- 2007–2010: Fußballakademie Linz

Senior career*
Years	Team	Apps	(Gls)
2010–2012	Rapid Wien II	53	(11)
2012–2013	Rapid Wien	1	(0)
2013	→ Grödig (loan)	4	(0)
2013–2015	Wiener Neustadt	52	(9)
2015–2017	Sturm Graz	43	(0)
2017	Sturm Graz II	1	(0)
2017–2019	Rheindorf Altach	35	(6)
2019–2020	Melbourne Victory	9	(1)
2020	Irtysh	0	(0)
2021	Blau-Weiß Linz	16	(4)
2021–2023	Vaduz	56	(5)
2023–	Blau-Weiß Linz	47	(4)
- * Club domestic league appearances and goals as of 11 June 2025

Kristijan Dobras (born 9 October 1992) is an Austrian footballer who plays for Blau-Weiß Linz.

== Career ==
After two years at Rheindorf Altach he left the club at the end of the 2018–19 season.

On 20 August 2019, ahead of the 2019–20 A-League season, Dobras joined Melbourne Victory on a one-year contract.

On 30 June 2023, Dobras returned to Blau-Weiß Linz.

== Career statistics ==
As of 9 February 2018

Appearances and goals by club, season and competition
Club	Season	League			Cup		Other		Total	
Club	Season	Division	Apps	Goals	Apps	Goals	Apps	Goals	Apps	Goals
Rapid Wien II	2010–11	Austrian Regionalliga	17	0	0	0	0	0	17	0
Rapid Wien II	2011–12	Austrian Regionalliga	28	6	3	1	0	0	31	7
Rapid Wien II	2012–13	Austrian Regionalliga	8	5	0	0	0	0	8	5
Rapid Wien II	Total		53	11	3	1	0	0	56	12
Rapid Wien	2012–13	Austrian Football Bundesliga	1	0	1	1	0	0	2	1
Grödig (loan)	2012–13	Austrian Football First League	4	0	0	0	0	0	4	0
Wiener Neustadt	2013–14	Austrian Football Bundesliga	27	4	1	0	0	0	28	4
Wiener Neustadt	2014–15	Austrian Football Bundesliga	25	5	1	0	0	0	26	5
Wiener Neustadt	Total		52	9	2	0	0	0	54	9
Sturm Graz	2015–16	Austrian Football Bundesliga	30	0	2	2	2 (Note: Appearances in UEFA Europa League)	0	34	2
Sturm Graz	2016–17	Austrian Football Bundesliga	13	0	1	1	0	0	14	1
Sturm Graz	Total		43	0	3	3	2	0	48	3
Sturm Graz II	2016–17	Austrian Regionalliga	1	0	0	0	0	0	1	0
Rheindorf Altach	2017–18	Austrian Football Bundesliga	17	3	3	0	8	1	28	4
Career totals			171	23	12	5	10	1	193	29

== Personal life ==
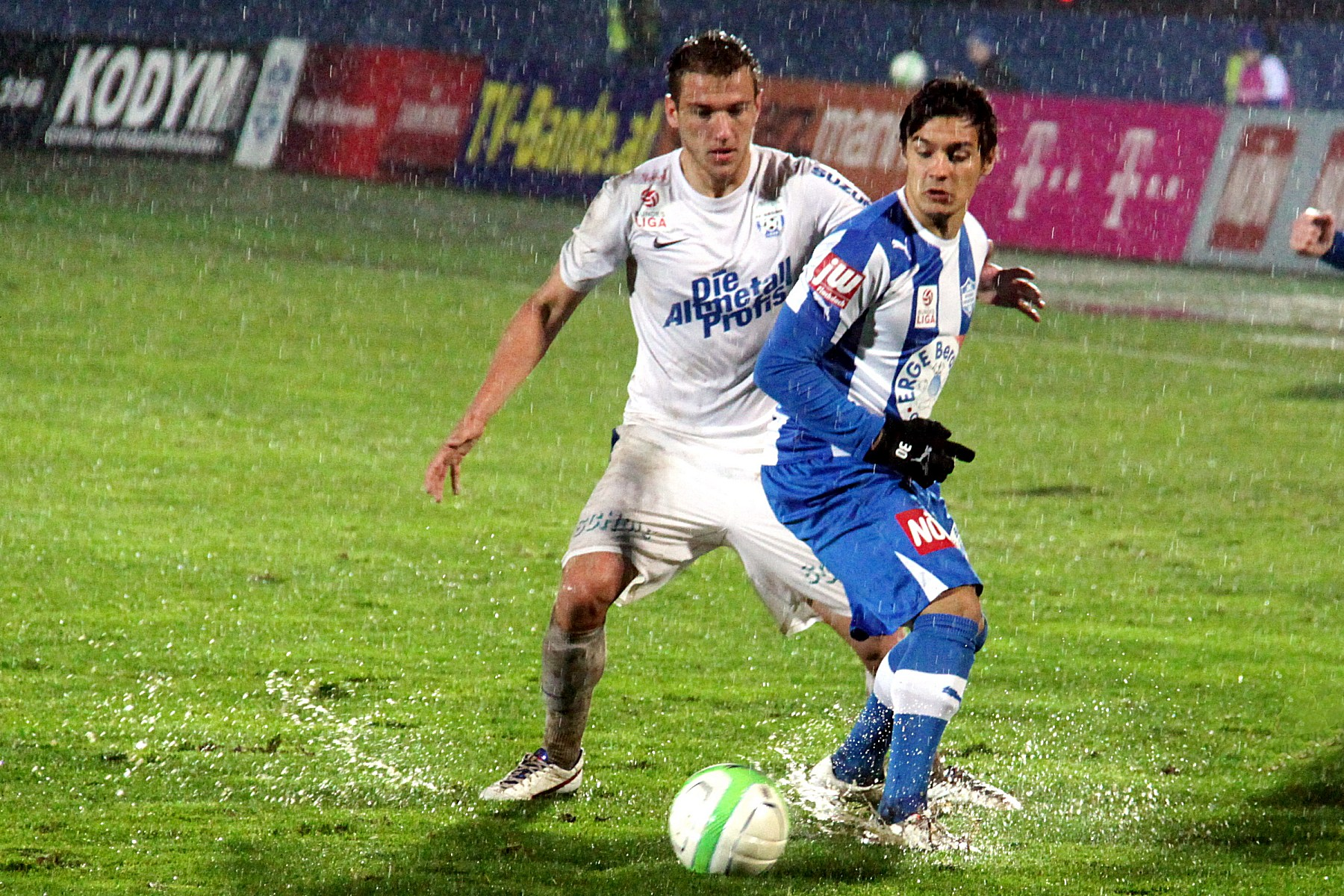
Dobras (in blue shirt) during the match between SV Grödig and SC Wiener Neustadt on 23 November 2013

Dobras is of Croatian descent.
