= Parties in the European Council during 1998 =

This article describes the party affiliations of the leaders of each member-state represented in the European Council during the year 1998. The list below gives the political party that each head of government, or head of state, belonged to at the national level, as well as the European political alliance to which that national party belonged. The states are listed from most to least populous. More populous states have greater influence in the council, in accordance with the system of Qualified Majority Voting.

== Summary ==
Party	1 January 1998		21 October 1998		27 October 1998
Party	#	QMV	#	QMV	#	QMV
Party of European Socialists	8	39	9	49	10	59
European People's Party	4	25	4	25	3	15
Independent	3	23	2	13	2	13

== List of leaders (1 January 1998) ==
Member-state	Votes	Leader	National party	European party
Germany	10	Helmut Kohl	CDU	EPP
France	10	Jacques Chirac	RPR	Independent
United Kingdom	10	Tony Blair	Lab	PES
Italy	10	Romano Prodi	Independent
Spain	8	José María Aznar	PP	EPP
Netherlands	5	Wim Kok	PvdA	PES
Greece	5	Costas Simitis	PA.SO.K.	PES
Belgium	5	Jean-Luc Dehaene	CD&V	EPP
Portugal	5	António Guterres	PS	PES
Sweden	4	Göran Persson	SAP	PES
Austria	4	Viktor Klima	SPÖ	PES
Denmark	3	Poul Nyrup Rasmussen	A	PES
Finland	3	Paavo Lipponen	SDP	PES
Ireland	3	Bertie Ahern	FF	Independent
Luxembourg	2	Jean-Claude Juncker	CSV	EPP

== Changes ==
=== Affiliation ===
Date	Member-state	Leader	National party	European party
21 October	Italy	Massimo D'Alema	DS	PES
27 October	Germany	Gerhard Schröder	SPD	PES

== See also ==
- Presidency of the Council of the European Union
