= Thomas Hinum =

Austrian footballer

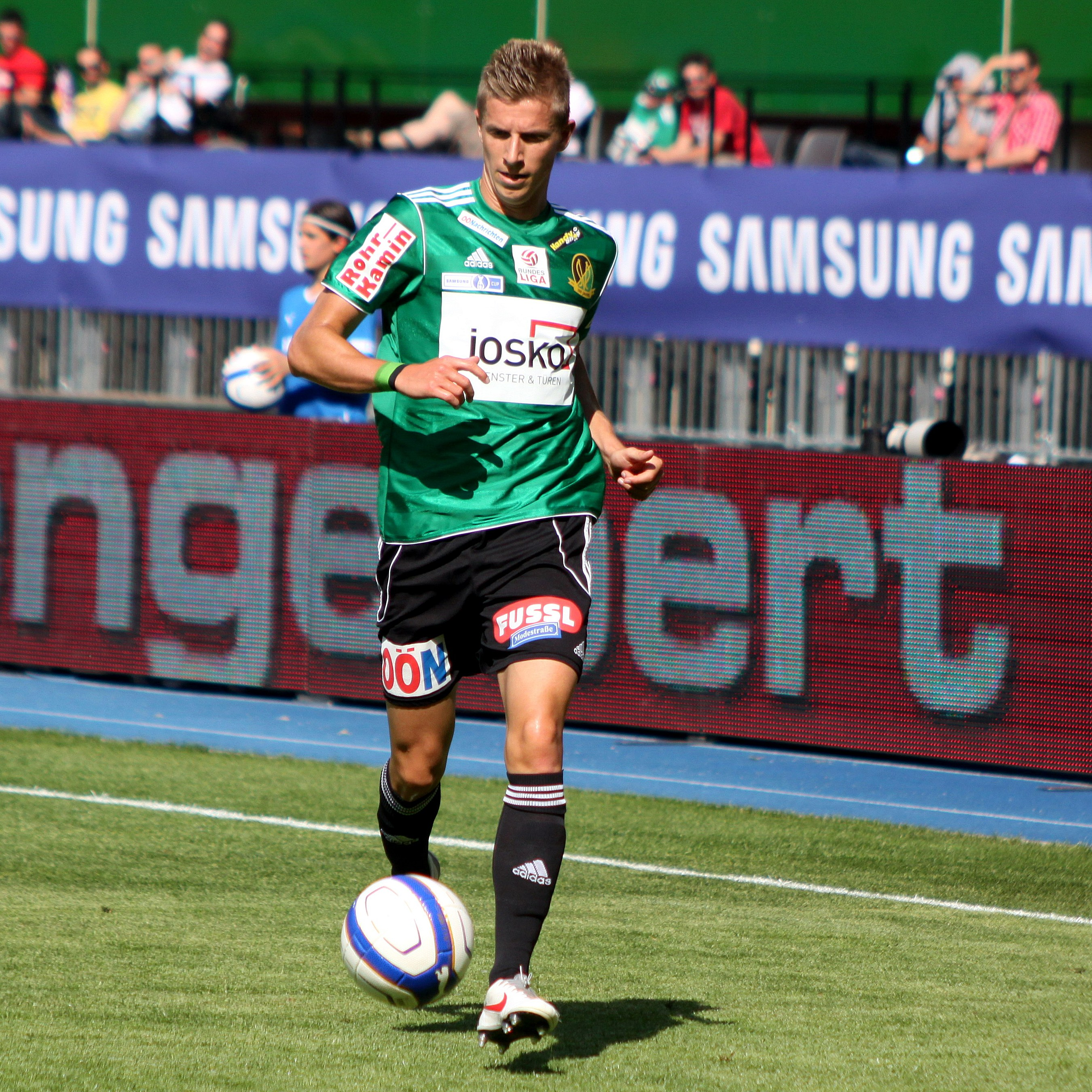

Personal information
- Full name: Thomas Hinum
- Date of birth: 24 July 1987 (age 39)
- Place of birth: Sankt Florian, Austria
- Height: 1.81 m (5 ft 11 in)
- Position: Midfielder

Team information
- Current team: SKU Amstetten
- Number: 8

Youth career
- ASK St. Valentin
- 2004–2005: Union St. Florian

Senior career*
Years	Team	Apps	(Gls)
2005–2007	SV Pasching		
2006–2007	→ SC Schwanenstadt (loan)	20	(1)
2007–2008	FC Kärnten	21	(4)
2007–2010	Austria Kärnten	52	(5)
2010–2011	Rapid Wien	11	(0)
2011–2014	SV Ried	94	(1)
2014–2016	LASK Linz	50	(6)
2016–2018	Blau-Weiß Linz	56	(6)
2018–	SKU Amstetten	20	(1)
- * Club domestic league appearances and goals as of 15:56, 22 August 2019 (UTC)

Thomas Hinum (born 24 July 1987) is an Austrian football player who currently plays for SKU Amstetten. He played youth soccer at St. Valentin and St. Florian.
