= Muhammed Ildiz =

Austrian footballer

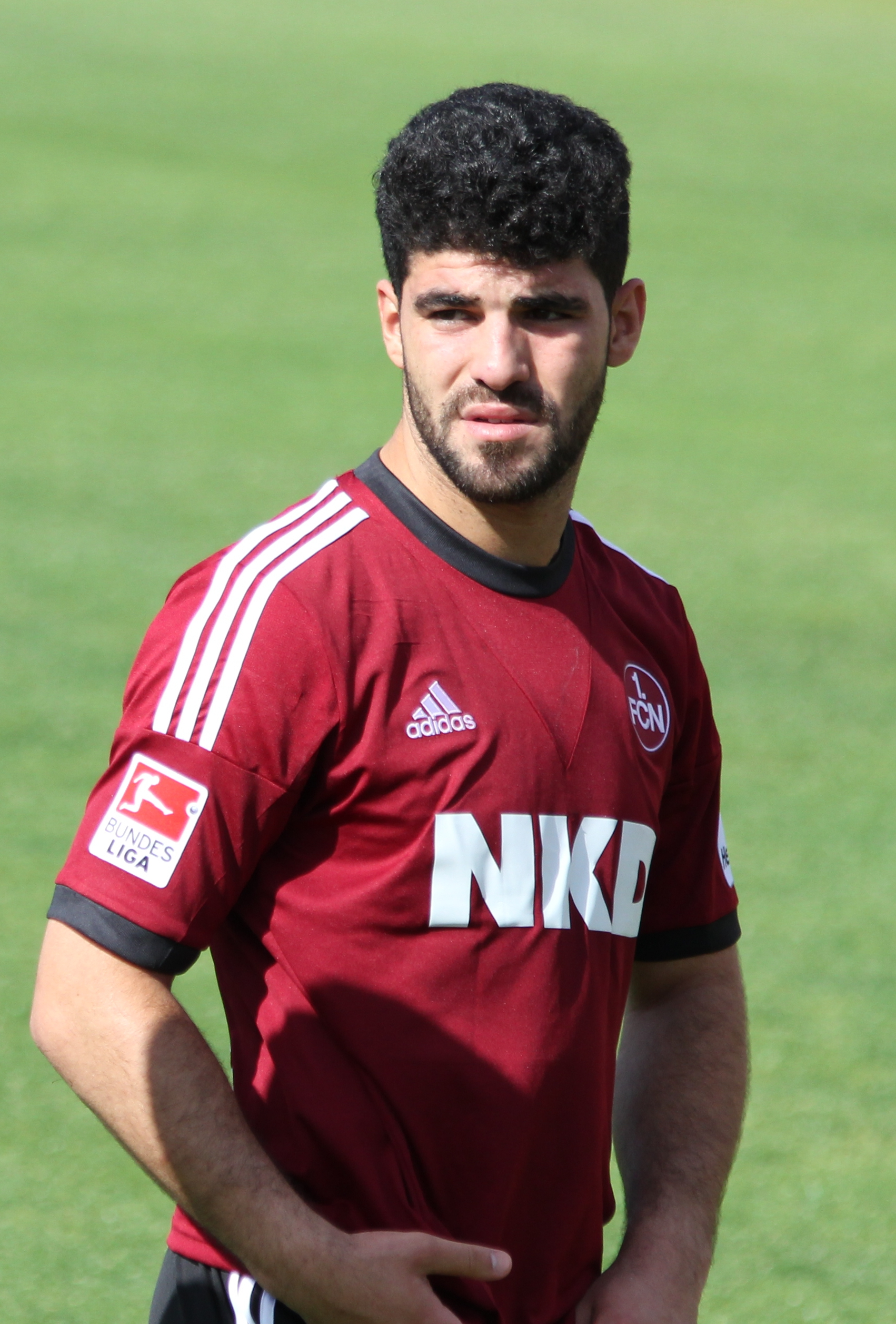
- Ildiz with Nürnberg in 2013

Personal information
- Date of birth: 14 May 1991 (age 35)
- Place of birth: Vienna, Austria
- Height: 1.77 m (5 ft 10 in)
- Position: Midfielder

Youth career
- 1999–2001: Red Star Penzing
- 2001–2008: Rapid Wien

Senior career*
Years	Team	Apps	(Gls)
2008–2013	Rapid Wien Amateure	39	(4)
2009–2013	Rapid Wien	15	(0)
2010–2012	→ Wacker Innsbruck (loan)	30	(1)
2010–2012	→ Wacker Innsbruck II (loan)	8	(4)
2013–2014	1. FC Nürnberg	5	(0)
2014–2018	Gaziantepspor	64	(1)
2018	Elazığspor	8	(3)
2018–2019	Giresunspor	9	(1)
2019	Elazığspor	3	(0)
2020–2021	Elazığspor	19	(3)
2021–2022	Iğdır FK	7	(1)
2022	Mauerwerk	1	(0)
2022	Wiener Viktoria	2	(0)

International career
2007	Austria U17	2	(1)
- * Club domestic league appearances and goals

Muhammed Ildiz (born 14 May 1991) is a Turkish descent Austrian former professional footballer.

== Club career ==
On the last day of the 2019 winter transfer window, Ildiz was one of 22 players on two hours, that signed for Turkish club Elazığspor. had been placed under a transfer embargo but managed to negotiate it with the Turkish FA, leading to them going on a mad spree of signing and registering a load of players despite not even having a permanent manager in place. In just two hours, they managed to snap up a record 22 players - 12 coming in on permanent contracts and a further 10 joining on loan deals until the end of the season. His contract was terminated on 30 May 2019.

== International career ==
Ildiz was born in Austria and is of Turkish descent. He is a youth international for Austria.

== Personal life ==
Muhammed is the older brother of footballer Ahmed Ildiz.
