= Andreas Schicker =

Austrian footballer

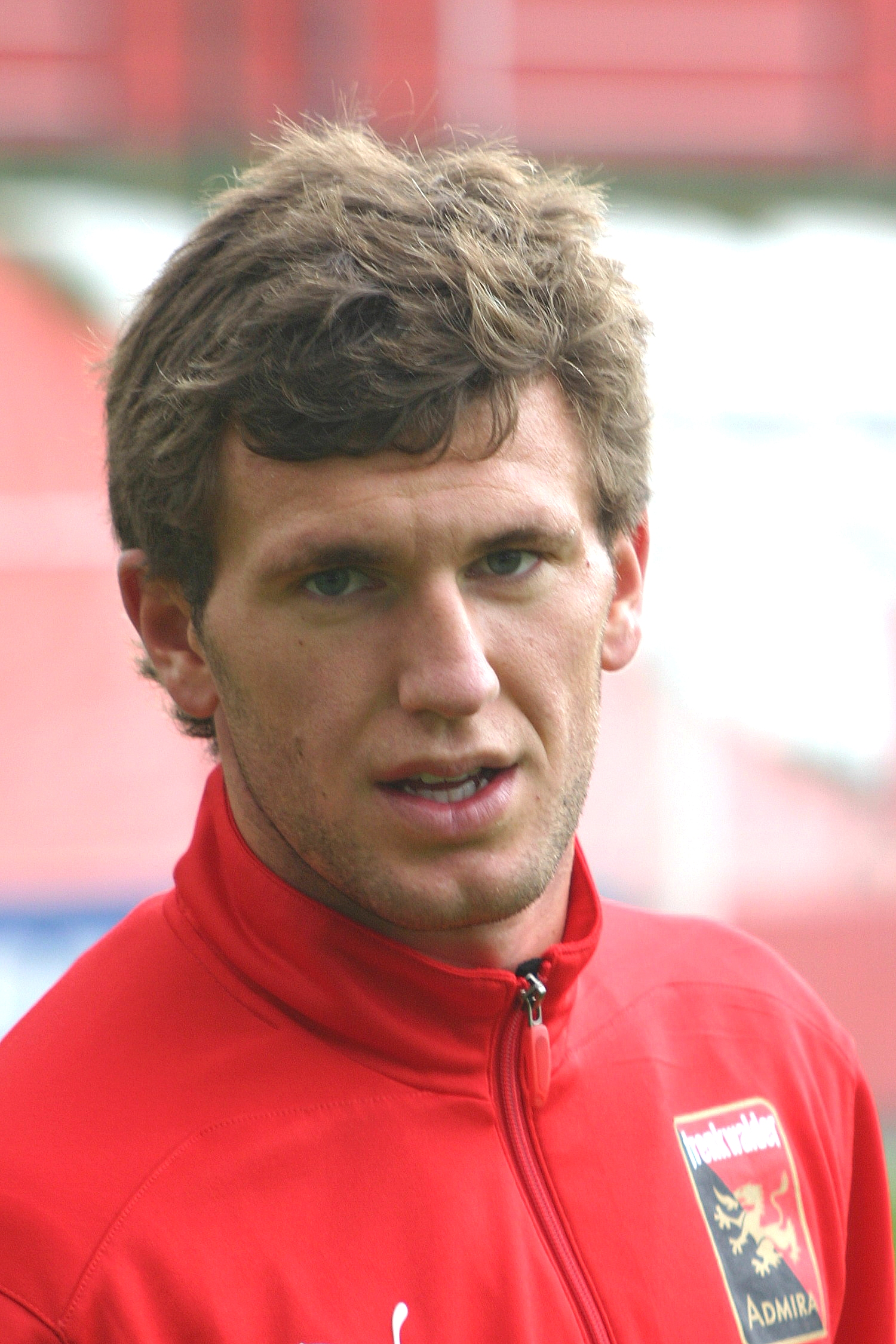
- Schicker with Admira Wacker

Personal information
- Date of birth: 6 July 1986 (age 40)
- Place of birth: Austria
- Height: 1.75 m (5 ft 9 in)
- Position: Left-back

Team information
- Current team: Sturm Graz (sporting director)

Senior career*
Years	Team	Apps	(Gls)
2003–2004	Austria Wien	1	(0)
2004–2006	SV Ried	67	(0)
2006–2007	Austria Wien	18	(0)
2007–2008	ASK Schwadorf	20	(0)
2008–2010	FC Admira Wacker Mödling	55	(2)
2010–2012	SC Wiener Neustadt	66	(0)
2012–2014	SV Ried	49	(1)
2014–2015	SV Horn	0	(0)
2015–2016	Wiener Neustadt II	2	(0)
2016–2017	Wiener Neustadt	43	(0)
2017–2018	SC Bruck/Mur		

Managerial career
- 2015–2017: Wiener Neustadt (player assistant)
- 2017–?: Wiener Neustadt (sporting director)
- 2020: Sturm Graz (sporting director)
- * Club domestic league appearances and goals

Andreas Schicker (born 6 July 1986) is an Austrian former professional footballer who works as a sporting director at Sturm Graz.

== Career ==
In November 2014, Schicker injured both hands in an accident with fireworks and his left hand had to be amputated.

In 2017 he joined lower-league side SC Bruck/Mur.
