= Rene Seebacher =

Austrian footballer

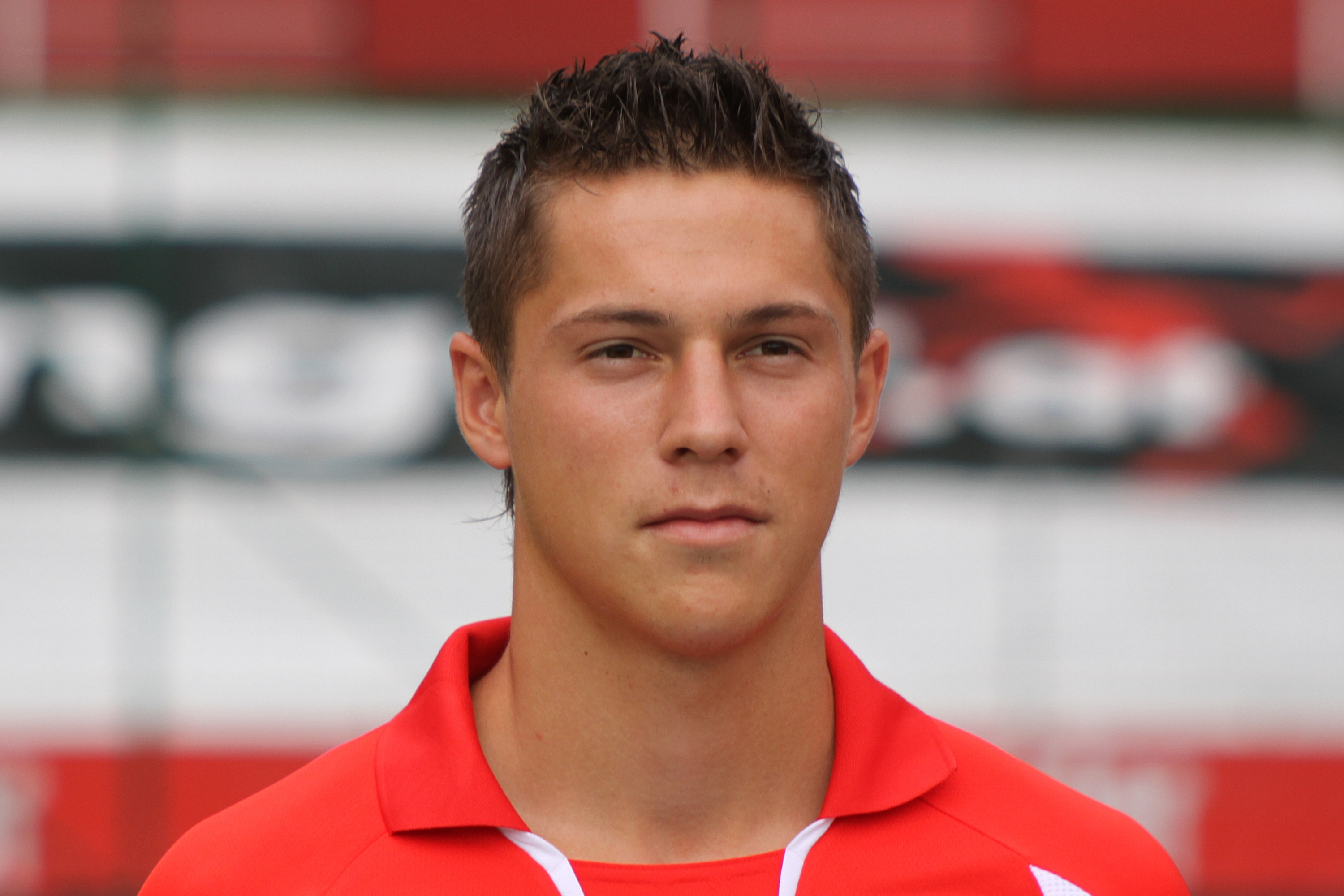

Personal information
- Full name: Rene Seebacher
- Date of birth: 24 July 1988 (age 38)
- Place of birth: Klagenfurt, Austria
- Height: 1.80 m (5 ft 11 in)
- Position: Midfielder

Team information
- Current team: ATSV Wolfsberg

Senior career*
Years	Team	Apps	(Gls)
2007–2008	Kärnten	30	(0)
2010–2013	Admira Wacker	56	(1)
2010–2011	→ TSV Hartberg (loan)	44	(0)
2014–2015	Wolfsberger AC	28	(4)
2015–2016	SC Wiener Neustadt	25	(1)
2016–2017	SV Kapfenberg	33	(0)
2017–	ATSV Wolfsberg		
- * Club domestic league appearances and goals as of 26 May 2017

Rene Seebacher (born 24 July 1988) is an Austrian footballer currently playing for ATSV Wolfsberg.
