= Philipp Steiner =

Austrian footballer

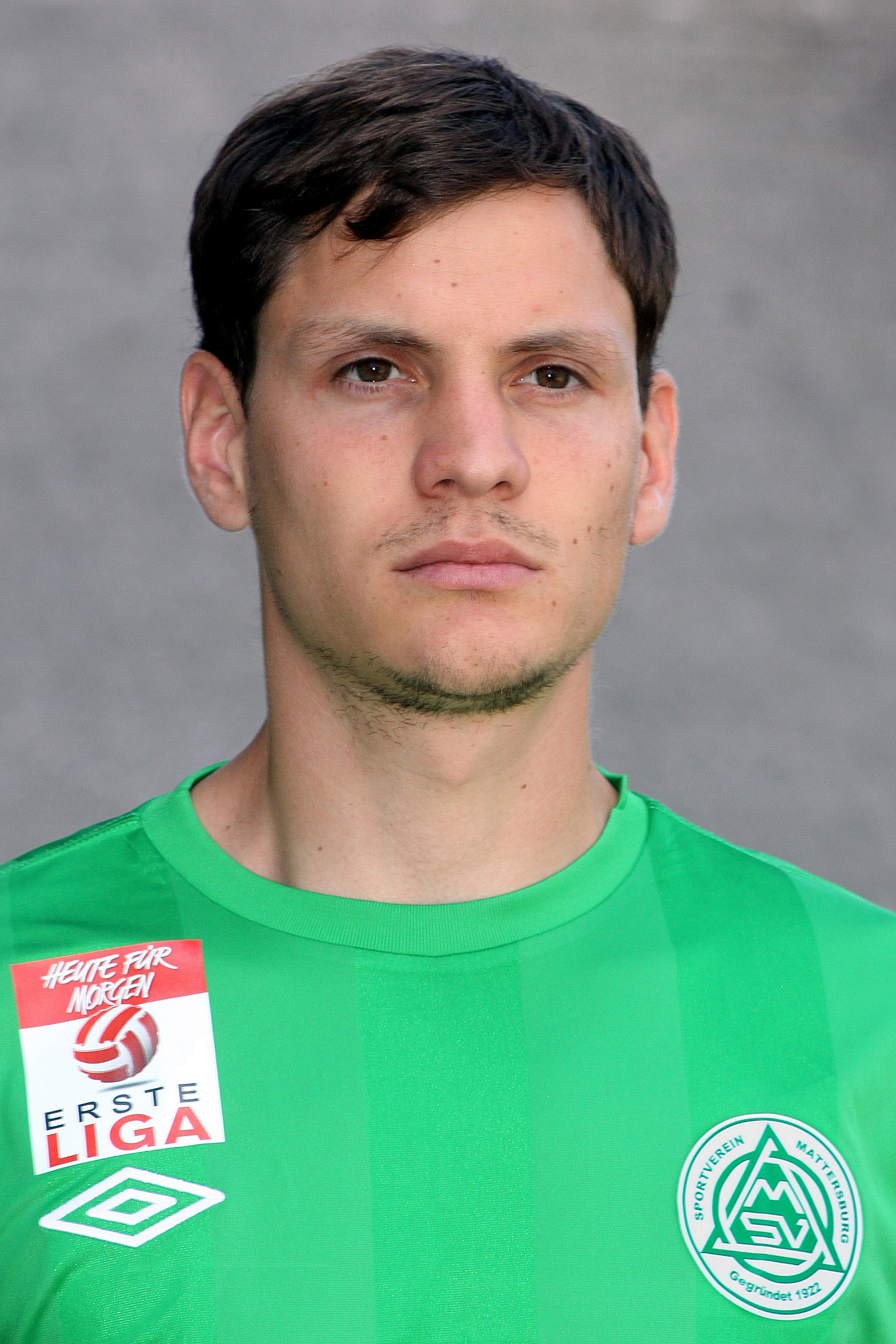
- Steiner in 2013

Personal information
- Date of birth: 20 December 1986 (age 39)
- Place of birth: Austria
- Position: Centre back

Team information
- Current team: Neusiedl am See
- Number: 13

Youth career
- Neusiedl am See

Senior career*
Years	Team	Apps	(Gls)
2009–2014	SV Mattersburg	25	(0)
2014–2015	Neusiedl am See	39	(3)
2015–2016	FAC	21	(0)
2016–	Neusiedl am See		
- * Club domestic league appearances and goals as of 8 June 2016

Philipp Steiner (born 20 December 1986) is an Austrian footballer who plays as a defender for SC Neusiedl am See 1919.
