= Mario Reiter (footballer) =

Austrian footballer

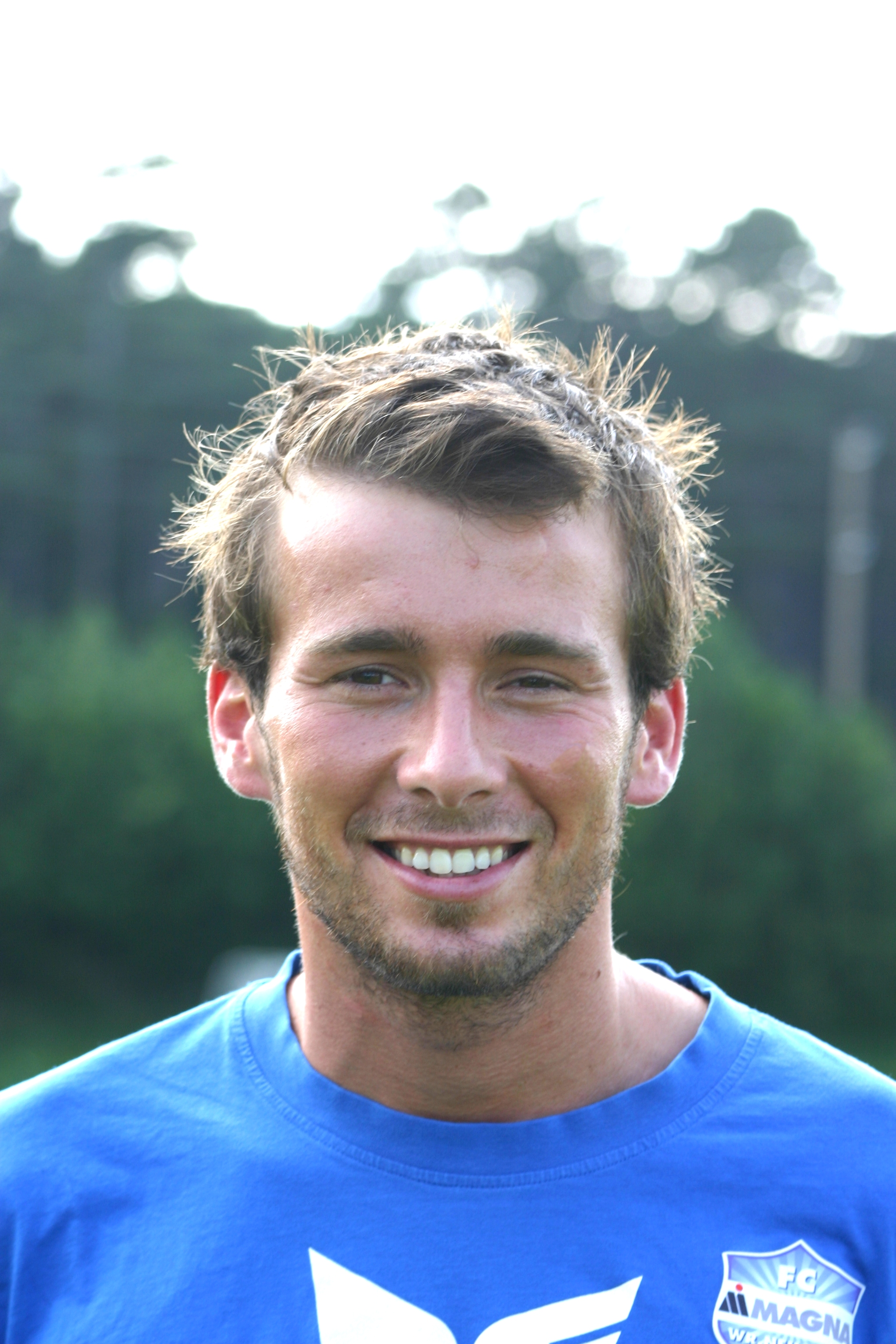

Personal information
- Full name: Mario Reiter
- Date of birth: 23 October 1986 (age 40)
- Place of birth: Steyr, Austria
- Height: 1.86 m (6 ft 1 in)
- Position: Midfielder

Team information
- Current team: Union Dietach

Youth career
- 1993–2004: SC Ernsthofen

Senior career*
Years	Team	Apps	(Gls)
2004–2007	ASKÖ Pasching	14	(0)
2004	→ FC Untersiebenbrunn (loan)	8	(0)
2006	→ SC Schwanenstadt (loan)	12	(1)
2007–2008	SC Schwanenstadt	54	(0)
2008–2012	Wiener Neustadt	109	(10)
2012–2014	SV Ried	17	(1)
2015	LASK Linz Juniors	11	(0)
2015–2016	LASK Linz	28	(1)
2017–2019	ASKÖ Oedt		
2019–2020	WSC Hertha Wels	15	(2)
2020–	Union Dietach	10	(0)

International career
2003–2007	Austria U-21	10	(0)
- * Club domestic league appearances and goals as of 21:04, 25 October 2020 (UTC)

Mario Reiter (born 23 October 1986) is an Austrian footballer who plays as a midfielder for Union Dietach.
