= Nacho Rodríguez (Spanish footballer) =

Spanish footballer (born 1982)

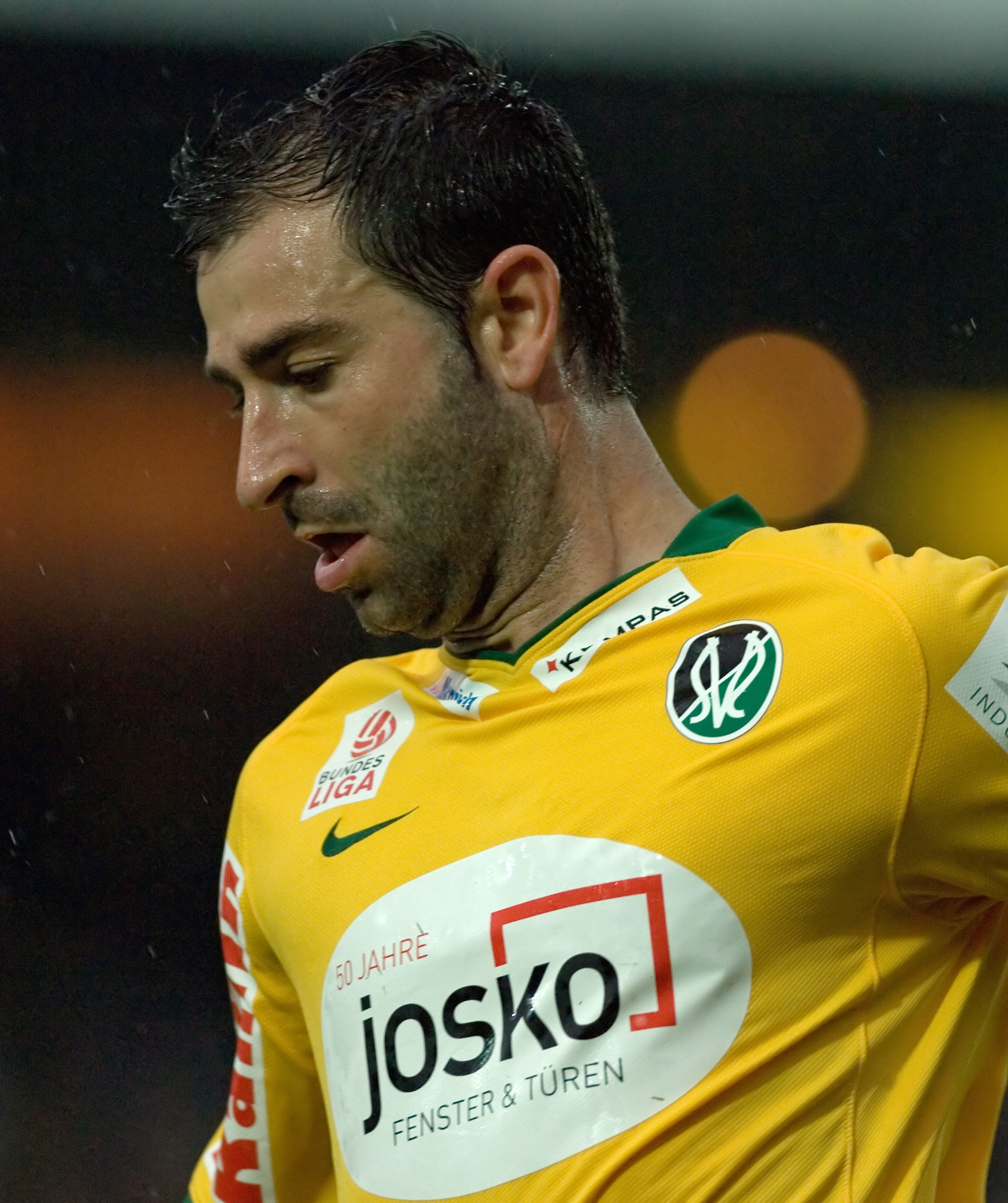
- Rodríguez in action for Ried in 2013

Personal information
- Full name: Ignacio Rodríguez Ortiz
- Date of birth: 6 November 1982 (age 43)
- Place of birth: Laredo, Spain
- Height: 1.80 m (5 ft 11 in)
- Position: Forward

Youth career
- Oviedo

Senior career*
Years	Team	Apps	(Gls)
2000–2003	Racing B	70	(26)
2002–2003	Racing Santander	3	(0)
2002	→ Cultural Leonesa (loan)	19	(4)
2003	Cartagena	11	(0)
2004	Logroñés	17	(4)
2004–2005	Alavés B	34	(4)
2005–2006	Oviedo	30	(1)
2006	Mazarrón	17	(7)
2007	Racing B	21	(5)
2007–2008	Lanzarote	34	(6)
2008–2013	Ried	148	(28)
2013–2014	Noja	15	(9)
2014	Alcoyano	18	(6)
2014	Universitario Sucre	5	(0)
2015	Sestao	16	(9)
2015–2016	Guijuelo	17	(4)
2016–2017	Mensajero	45	(12)
2017–2020	Gimnástica	61	(25)
2020–2021	Colindres	3	(2)
Total		584	(152)

International career
1999	Spain U17	1	(0)
2000–2001	Spain U18	6	(0)
- * Club domestic league appearances and goals

Ignacio "Nacho" Rodríguez Ortiz (Spanish pronunciation: [iɣˈnaθjo ˈnatʃo roˈðɾiɣeθ oɾˈtiθ]; born 6 November 1982 in Laredo, Cantabria) is a Spanish former professional footballer who played as a forward.
