= Jan Marc Riegler =

Austrian footballer

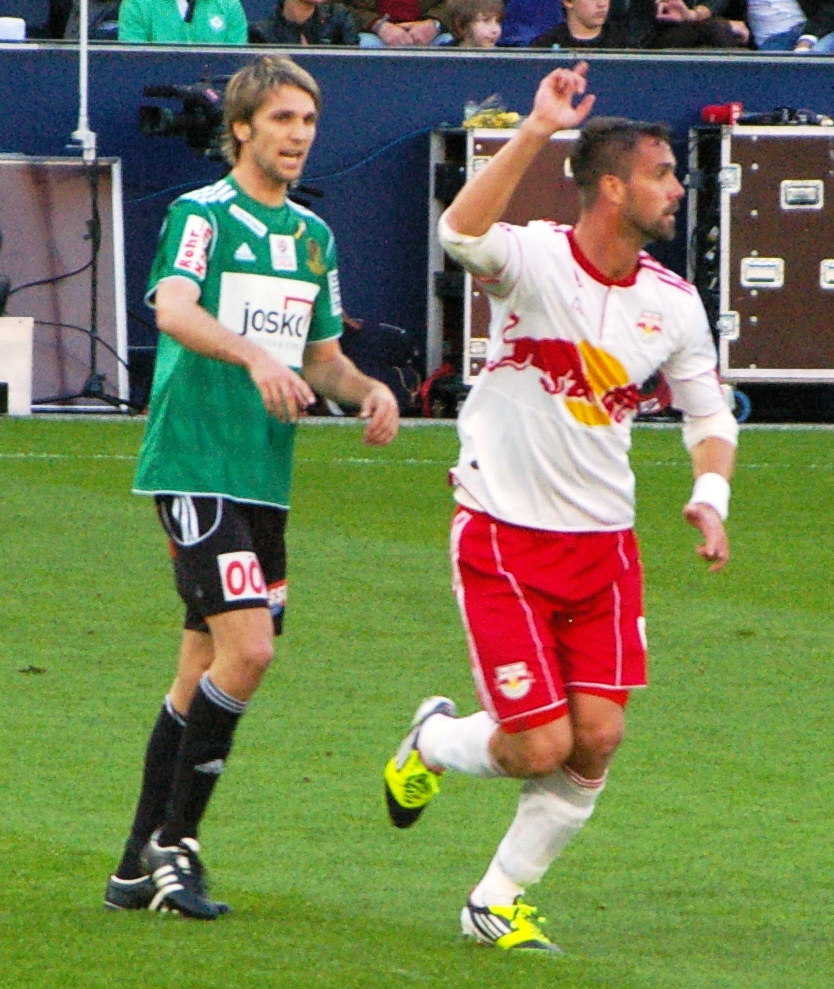

Personal information
- Date of birth: 18 April 1988 (age 38)
- Place of birth: Braunau am Inn, Austria
- Height: 1.89 m (6 ft 2 in)
- Position: Defender

Youth career
- SV Braunau

Senior career*
Years	Team	Apps	(Gls)
2006–2007	SV Ried	2	(0)
2007–2010	FC Red Bull Salzburg	0	(0)
2010–2014	SV Ried	102	(5)
- * Club domestic league appearances and goals as of 4 December 2013

Jan Marc Riegler (born 18 April 1988) is an Austrian footballer.
