= Thomas Reifeltshammer =

Austrian footballer

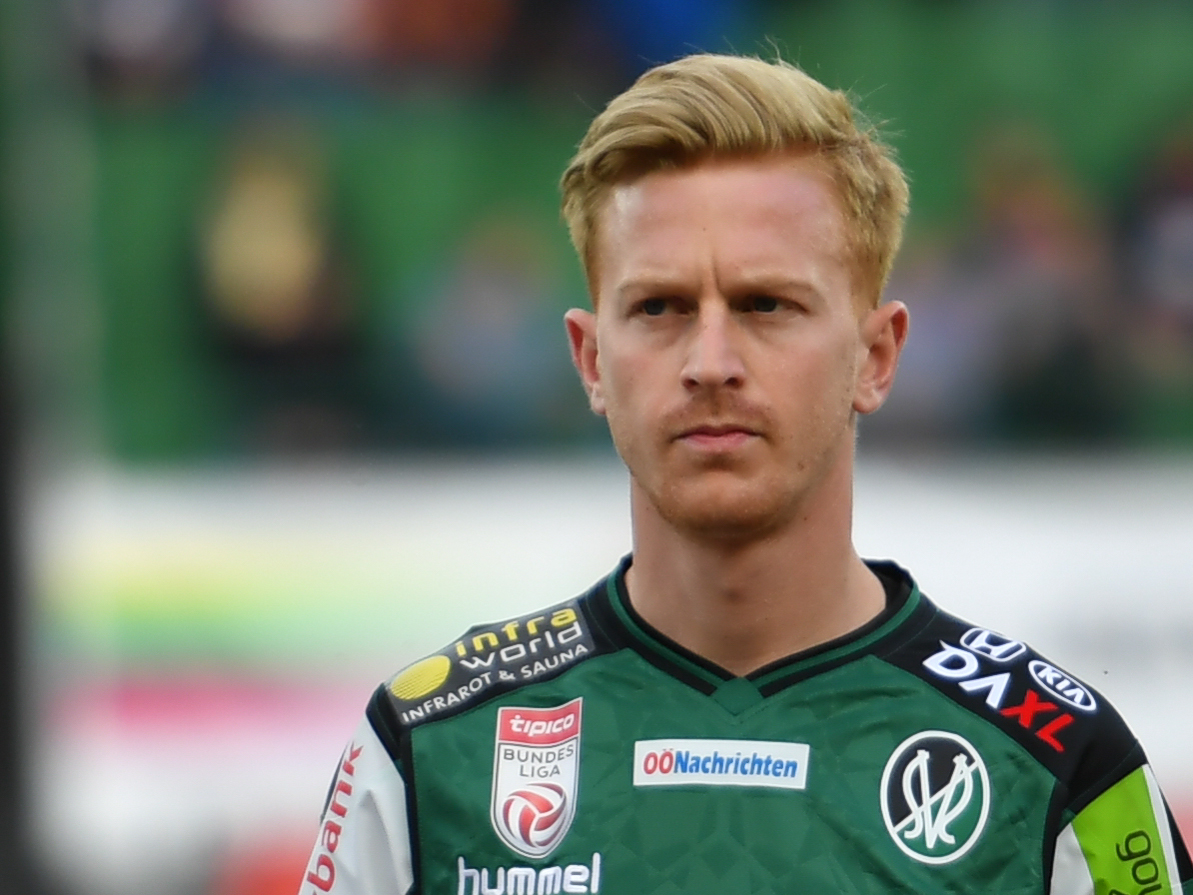

Personal information
- Full name: Thomas Reifeltshammer
- Date of birth: 3 July 1988 (age 38)
- Place of birth: Ried im Innkreis, Austria
- Height: 1.88 m (6 ft 2 in)
- Position: Centre back

Youth career
- 1994–2009: Ried

Senior career*
Years	Team	Apps	(Gls)
2008–2021	Ried	272	(23)
- * Club domestic league appearances and goals

Thomas Reifeltshammer (born 3 July 1988) is an Austrian former professional association football player. He played as a defender. Reifeltshammer made his professional debut on 27 November 2009, coming on as a substitute in the 0–0 draw with SV Mattersburg.
