= Boris Prokopič =

Footballer (born 1988)

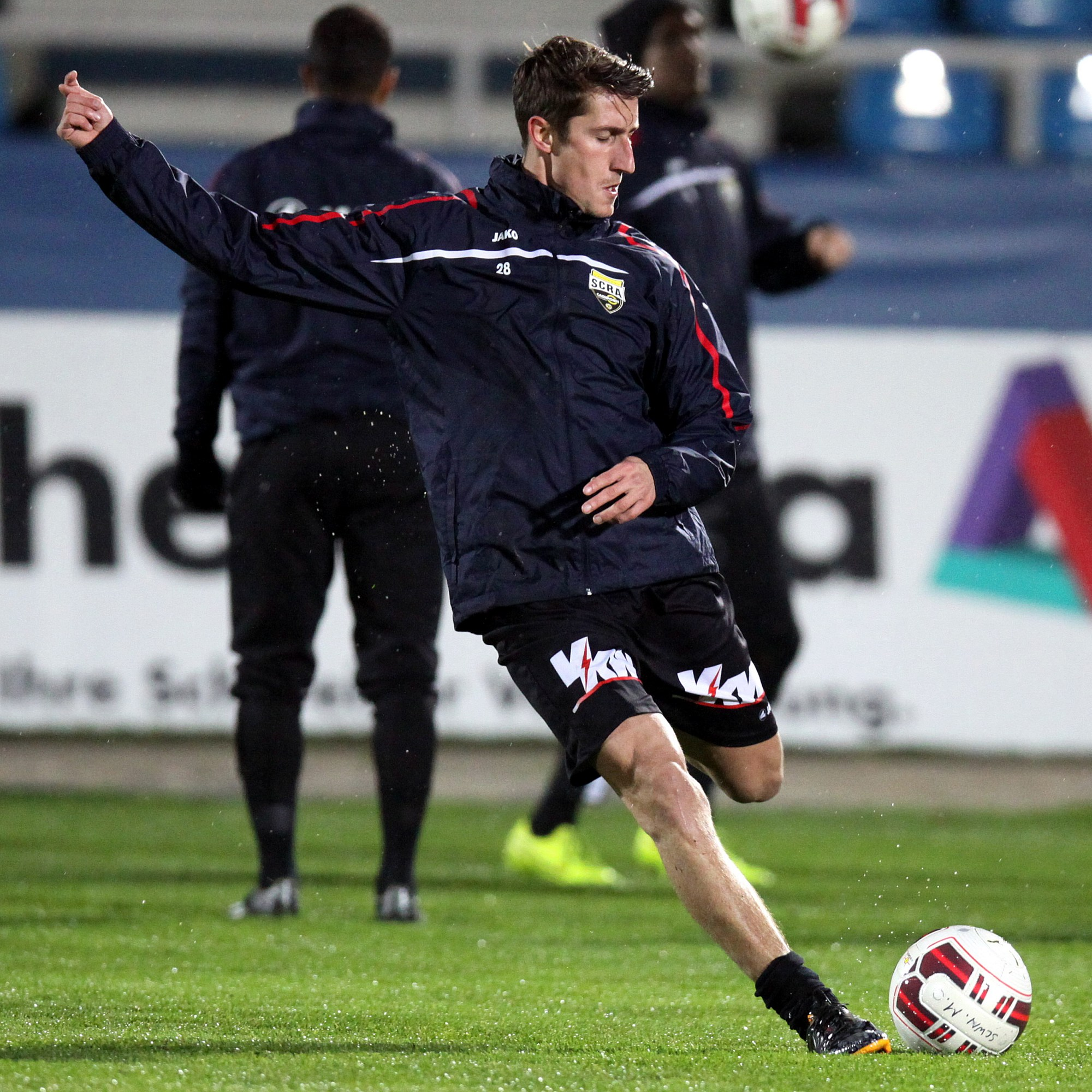
- Prokopič in 2014

Personal information
- Date of birth: 29 March 1988 (age 38)
- Place of birth: Poprad, Czechoslovakia
- Height: 1.81 m (5 ft 11 in)
- Position: Attacking midfielder

Team information
- Current team: Brühl
- Number: 28

Youth career
- FK Spišská Nová Ves
- 2004–2006: SV Horn
- 2006: Rapid Wien

Senior career*
Years	Team	Apps	(Gls)
2006–2009	Rapid Wien II	40	(7)
2008–2013	Rapid Wien	29	(3)
2010–2011	→ Wacker Innsbruck (loan)	29	(5)
2013–2019	Rheindorf Altach	113	(13)
2019–2021	FC Vaduz	60	(0)
2021–2022	Rheindorf Altach	6	(0)
2022	Rheindorf Altach Juniors	3	(1)
2022–	Brühl	27	(1)

International career
2008–2010	Austria U21	6	(1)
- * Club domestic league appearances and goals as of 26 October 2023

Boris Prokopič (born 29 March 1988) is a footballer who plays as a midfielder for Brühl in the Swiss third-tier Promotion League. Born in what is now Slovakia, Prokopič was a youth international for Austria.

== Career ==
Prokopić began his career in the youth from SV Horn. In 2006, at the age of sixteen, he joined to the academy from Rapid Wien and after one year was promoted to the reserve team. Here he played during summer 2008 then was called from Peter Pacult for the Kampfmannschaft. On 8 July 2008 the first game of the 2008–09 season he gave his debut against SK Sturm Graz.

In the 2009–10 season in winter he was loaned out to FC Wacker Innsbruck (2002).In first season they were playing Austrian Football First League. In the second season they were promoted to Austrian Football Bundesliga. He made 29 appearances and scored 5 goals for Innsbruck.

In winter 2011 he returned to Rapid Wien. He played there until January 2013. He made 29 appearances and scored 5 goals. In January 2013 he left Rapid Wien and joined SCR Altach. He played there until January 2019. He made 113 appearances and scored 13 goals.

In January 2019 he joined FC Vaduz. In August 2020 they were promoted to the Swiss Super League.

In June 2022, Prokopič moved to Brühl in Switzerland.
