= Marcel Ziegl =

Austrian footballer (born 1992)

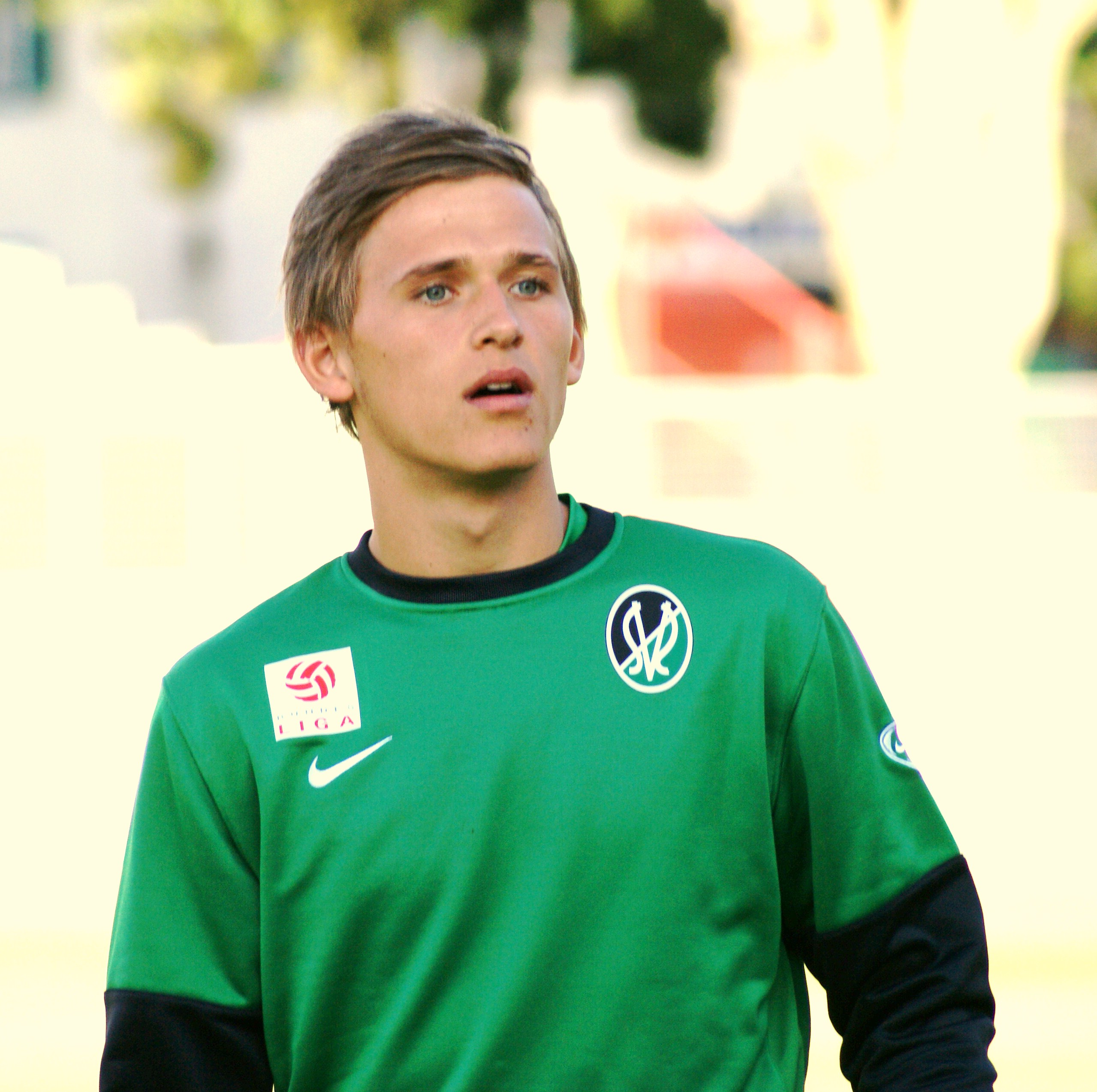

Personal information
- Date of birth: 20 December 1992 (age 33)
- Place of birth: Seewalchen, Austria
- Height: 1.82 m (5 ft 11 1/2 in)
- Position: Midfielder

Youth career
- 1998–2006: SK Kammer
- 2006–2009: Ried

Senior career*
Years	Team	Apps	(Gls)
2008–2024	Ried	307	(7)

International career
2008–2009	Austria U-17	8	(0)
2009–2010	Austria U-19	8	(0)
2011	Austria U-20	1	(0)
2012–2013	Austria U-21	9	(0)
- * Club domestic league appearances and goals

Marcel Ziegl (born 20 December 1992) is an Austrian former professional footballer who played as a midfielder.
