= Rudolf Edlinger =

Austrian politician (1940–2021)

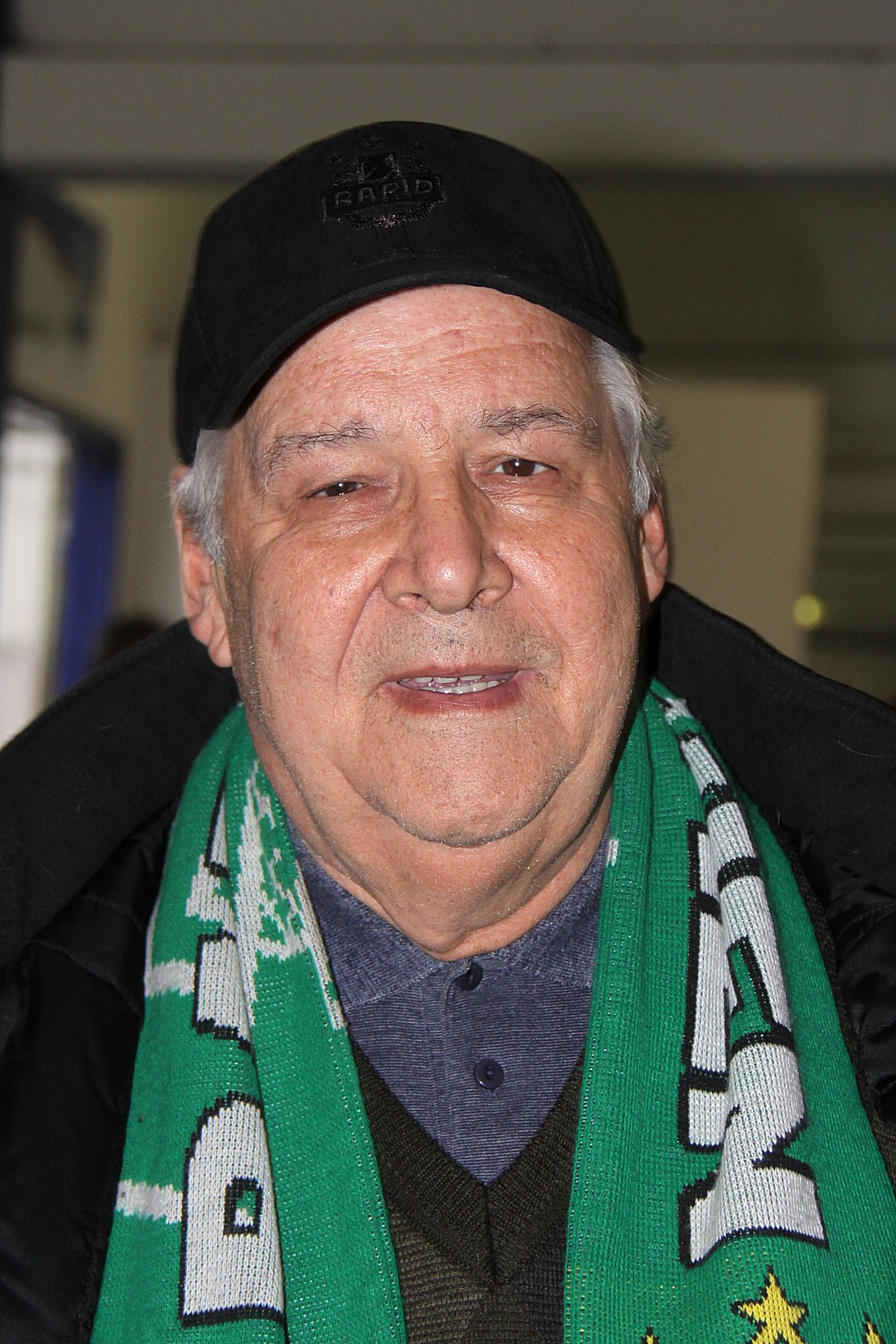
Edlinger in 2010

Rudolf Edlinger (20 February 1940 in Vienna – 21 August 2021) was a Social Democratic Party of Austria politician who served as Austrian Finance Minister (1997–2000) under Chancellor Viktor Klima. He was the president of the football club SK Rapid Wien between 2001 and 2013.
