= Thomas Prager =

Austrian footballer

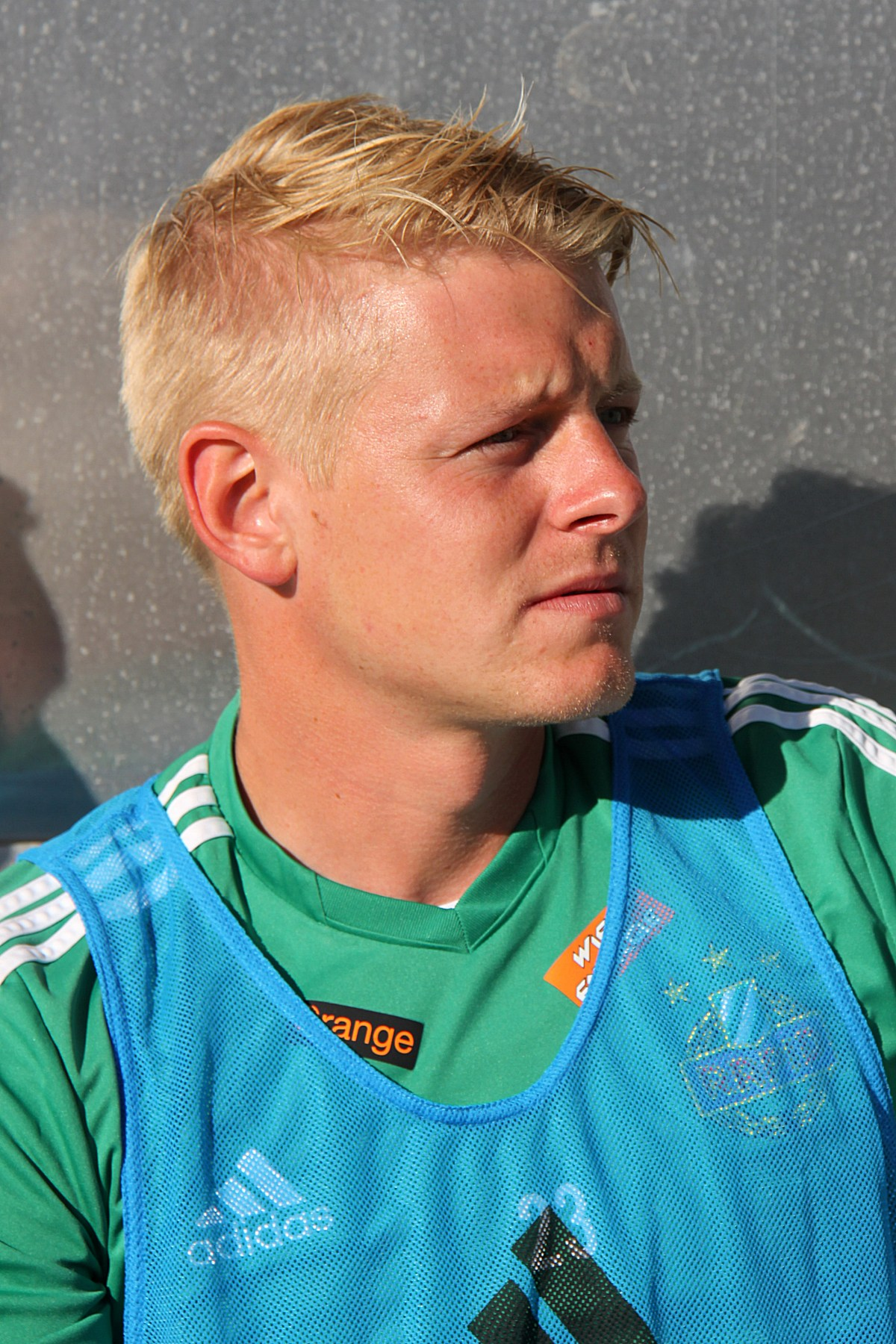

Personal information
- Full name: Thomas Prager
- Date of birth: 13 September 1985 (age 41)
- Place of birth: Vienna, Austria
- Height: 1.74 m (5 ft 8 1/2 in)
- Position: Midfielder

Team information
- Current team: Wiener Viktoria

Youth career
- 1991–1993: Prater SV
- 1993–1997: SV Hirschstetten
- 1997–2001: FC Stadlau
- 2001–2003: SC Heerenveen

Senior career*
Years	Team	Apps	(Gls)
2003–2008	SC Heerenveen	58	(1)
2008–2010	LASK Linz	52	(9)
2010–2012	FC Luzern	18	(0)
2011–2012	→ Rapid Wien (loan)	23	(0)
2012–2013	Rapid Wien	10	(0)
2014	Wiener Viktoria	11	(0)
2014–16	Ethnikos Achna	54	(0)
2016–17	EN Paralimni	24	(2)
2017–	Wiener Viktoria	0	(0)

International career
	Austria U17	8	(0)
	Austria U19	13	(1)
	Austria U21	19	(3)
2006–	Austria	14	(1)
- * Club domestic league appearances and goals as of 24 Dec 2017

Thomas Prager (born 13 September 1985) is an Austrian footballer who plays as a midfielder for Wiener Viktoria.

== Club career ==
Prager was lured away by Heerenveen from FC Stadlau and played 5 years for the Frisians but never managed to claim a regular spot in the starting line-up. He did not feature in the 2008–09 plans of Heerenveen manager Trond Sollied and was transferred to LASK Linz. In the summer of 2010, he was signed transfer free by FC Luzern. On 1 July 2011, he was loaned to Austrian club SK Rapid Wien for one year, with the option of a further year.

== International career ==
He made his debut for Austria on 23 May 2006 in a 4-1 friendly defeat against Croatia but was left out of the EURO 2008 squad. He has earned 14 caps, scoring one goal.
