= Harald Pichler =

Austrian footballer

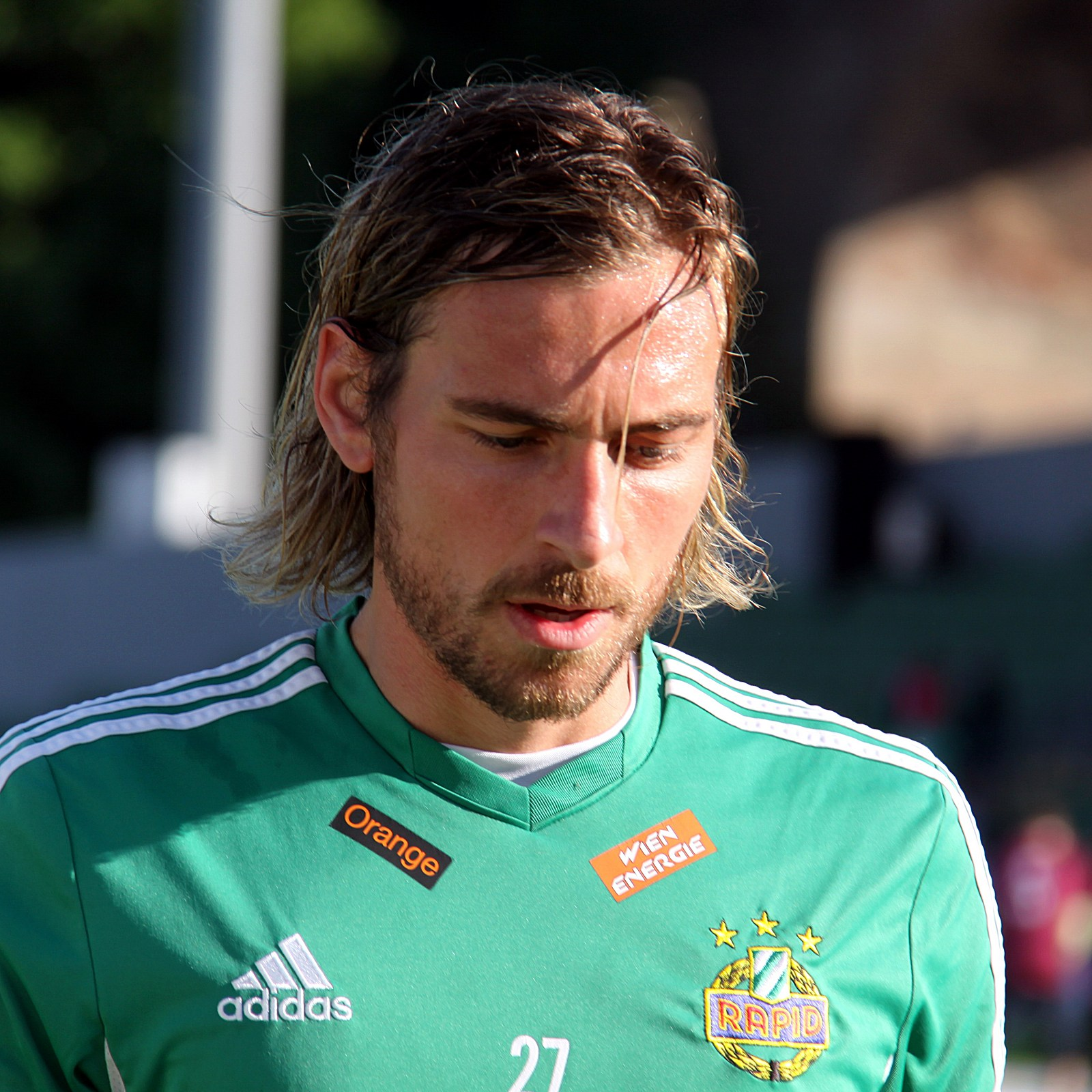

Personal information
- Date of birth: 18 June 1987 (age 39)
- Place of birth: Klagenfurt, Austria
- Height: 1.87 m (6 ft 2 in)
- Position: Defender

Team information
- Current team: SPG Silz/Mötz
- Number: 19

Youth career
- 1993–2005: FC Kärnten
- 2005–2006: SV Feldkirchen

Senior career*
Years	Team	Apps	(Gls)
2006–2010	Red Bull Salzburg II	91	(4)
2010–2011	Wacker Innsbruck	32	(0)
2011–2014	Rapid Wien	61	(2)
2014–2015	SV Ried	40	(2)
2015–2016	SV Grödig	26	(1)
2016–2018	FC Wacker Innsbruck	40	(1)
2018	Klagenfurter AC 1909	2	(0)
2019	FC Volders	6	(0)
2019–2020	FC Zirl	14	(0)
2020–2021	Union Innsbruck		
2021–	SPG Silz/Mötz	26	(2)
- * Club domestic league appearances and goals as of 23 June 2022

Harald Pichler (born 18 June 1987) is an Austrian footballer who plays for SPG Silz/Mötz in the Tiroler Liga. He played for Rapid Wien between 2011 and 2014.
