= Christopher Drazan =

Austrian football midfielder

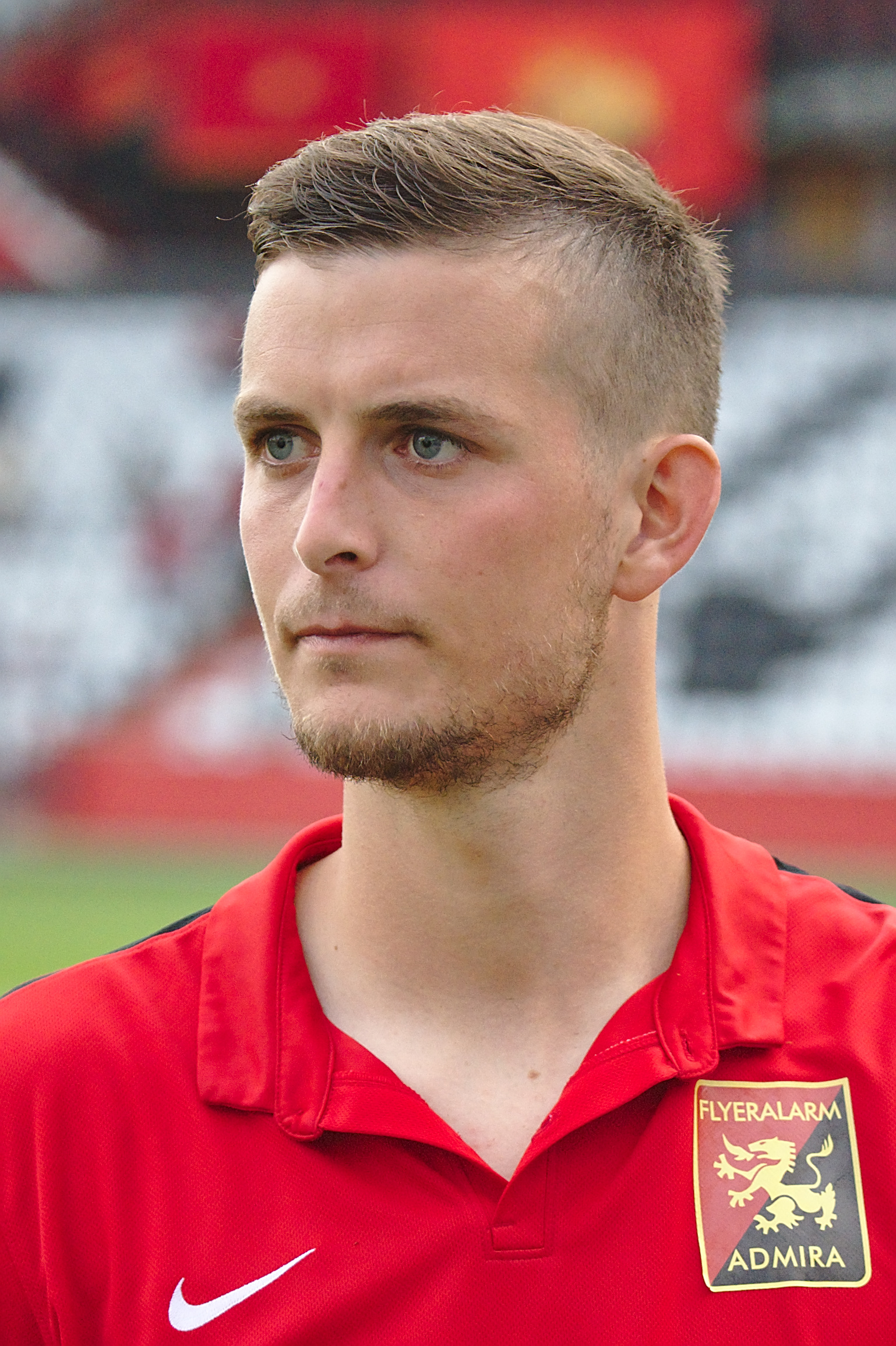

Personal information
- Date of birth: 2 October 1990 (age 36)
- Place of birth: Vienna, Austria
- Height: 1.84 m (6 ft 1/2 in)
- Position: Midfielder

Youth career
- 1996–2000: ASV Vösendorf
- 2000–2006: Admira Wacker

Senior career*
| Years | Team | Apps | (Gls) |
| 2006–2007 | Admira Wacker | 4 | (0) |
| 2007–2010 | Rapid Wien II | 29 | (0) |
| 2008–2013 | Rapid Wien | 112 | (6) |
| 2013–2015 | 1. FC Kaiserslautern | 11 | (0) |
| 2014 | → Rot-Weiß Erfurt (loan) | 17 | (2) |
| 2014–2015 | → LASK Linz (loan) | 26 | (3) |
| 2015–2016 | LASK Linz | 26 | (2) |
| 2016–2017 | St. Pölten | 9 | (0) |
| 2017–2018 | Austria Lustenau | 25 | (1) |
| 2018–2020 | FC Vaduz | 9 | (0) |
| 2020 | Dornbirn | 1 | (0) |
| 2020 | ASV Siegendorf | 0 | (0) |

International career
| 2008–2012 | Austria U21 | 13 | (4) |
| 2009–2011 | Austria | 3 | (0) |
- * Club domestic league appearances and goals as of 18:22, 7 December 2020 (UTC)

Christopher Drazan (born 2 October 1990) is an Austrian football midfielder.

== International ==
On 19 August 2008, Drazan made his debut in the starting eleven of the Austrian U-21 team against Ireland, being substituted in the 46th minute.

== Personal life ==
His father is the former FK Austria Wien player Fritz Drazan.
