= 2009–10 FC Red Bull Salzburg season =

Red Bull Salzburg
2009–10 season
- Manager: Huub Stevens
- Stadium: Red Bull Arena
- Austrian Football Bundesliga: 1st
- Austrian Cup: Third round
- UEFA Champions League: Play-off round
- UEFA Europa League: Round of 32
- Top goalscorer: League: Marc Janko (18); All: Marc Janko (22)
- Highest home attendance: 26,800 v Rapid Wien (23 April 2010, Austrian Football Bundesliga)
- Lowest home attendance: 7,600 v Kapfenberger SV (13 March 2010, Austrian Football Bundesliga)
- Average home league attendance: 13,014
- Biggest win: 7–1 v Vorwärts Steyr (Away, 15 August 2009, Austrian Cup); 7–1 v Austria Kärnten (Home, 4 October 2009, Austrian Football Bundesliga)
- Biggest defeat: 0–3 v Maccabi Haifa (Away, 25 August 2009, UEFA Champions League)
Home colours	Away colours

The 2009–10 season was Fußballclub Red Bull Salzburg's 77th season in existence as a football club. In addition to the domestic league, Red Bull Salzburg participated in the Austrian Cup, the UEFA Champions League and the UEFA Europa League.

== Squad ==
Squad at end of season

Note: Flags indicate national team as defined under FIFA eligibility rules; some limited exceptions apply. Players may hold more than one non-FIFA nationality.

No.	Pos.	Nation	Player
1	GK	SWE	Eddie Gustafsson
2	FW	AUT	Christoph Kröpfl
3	DF	SRB	Milan Dudić
5	DF	NGA	Rabiu Afolabi
6	DF	SUI	Christian Schwegler
7	FW	GER	Alexander Zickler
8	FW	DEN	Thomas Augustinussen
9	FW	ANT	Robin Nelisse
10	MF	CRO	Nikola Pokrivač
11	FW	AUT	Roman Wallner
13	MF	CMR	Somen Tchoyi
14	DF	NED	Barry Opdam
15	DF	AUT	Franz Schiemer
16	MF	CZE	Karel Piták

No.	Pos.	Nation	Player
17	DF	AUT	Andreas Ulmer
18	MF	SVK	Dušan Švento
19	MF	GER	Simon Cziommer
20	DF	TUN	Anis Boussaïdi
21	FW	AUT	Marc Janko
23	DF	UGA	Ibrahim Sekagya
24	MF	AUT	Christoph Leitgeb
25	MF	BIH	Admir Vladavić
26	FW	AUT	Alexander Aschauer
29	FW	CMR	Louis Ngwat-Mahop
30	GK	AUT	Wolfgang Schober
32	MF	AUT	Stefan Ilsanker
33	GK	AUT	Heinz Arzberger
37	DF	AUT	Jan Marc Riegler

== Competitions ==
=== Overview ===
Competition	First match	Last match	Starting round	Final position	Record							
Competition	First match	Last match	Starting round	Final position	Pld	W	D	L	GF	GA	GD	Win %
Austrian Football Bundesliga	19 July 2009	13 May 2010	Matchday 1	Winners	36	22	10	4	68	27	+41	61.11
Austrian Cup	15 August 2009	10 February 2010	First round	Third round	3	2	0	1	8	3	+5	66.67
UEFA Champions League	15 July 2009	25 August 2009	Second qualifying round	Play-off round	6	2	2	2	6	8	−2	33.33
UEFA Europa League	17 September 2009	25 February 2010	Group stage	Round of 32	8	6	1	1	11	5	+6	75.00
Total					53	32	13	8	93	43	+50	60.38

Source: Competitions

=== Austrian Football Bundesliga ===
==== League table ====
Pos	Team	Pld	W	D	L	GF	GA	GD	Pts	Qualification or relegation
1	Red Bull Salzburg (C)	36	22	10	4	68	27	+41	76	Qualification to Champions League second qualifying round
2	Austria Wien	36	23	6	7	60	34	+26	75	Qualification to Europa League second qualifying round
3	Rapid Wien	36	21	10	5	80	38	+42	73	Qualification to Europa League second qualifying round
4	Sturm Graz	36	16	10	10	50	36	+14	58	Qualification to Europa League third qualifying round (Note: per 2009–10 Austrian Cup)
5	Wiener Neustadt	36	13	8	15	54	58	−4	47	

Source: weltfussball.de (in German)
Rules for classification: 1) points; 2) goal difference; 3) number of goals scored.
(C) Champions

==== Results summary ====
Overall								Home						Away					
Pld	W	D	L	GF	GA	GD	Pts	W	D	L	GF	GA	GD	W	D	L	GF	GA	GD
36	22	10	4	68	27	+41	76	13	4	1	41	12	+29	9	6	3	27	15	+12

Source: Worldfootball

==== Results by round ====
Round	1	2	3	4	5	6	7	8	9	10	11	12	13	14	15	16	17	18	19	20	21	22	23	24	25	26	27	28	29	30	31	32	33	34	35	36
Ground	H	A	H	A	A	H	A	H	A	H	A	H	A	H	A	A	H	A	H	A	H	A	H	H	A	H	A	H	A	H	A	H	H	A	H	A
Result	W	L	W	W	D	W	D	W	W	W	L	D	D	W	W	W	D	D	W	W	W	W	D	W	D	W	W	W	W	W	D	D	W	L	L	W
Position	3	7	4	3	3	1	1	1	1	1	1	3	3	2	2	2	2	2	2	1	1	1	1	1	1	1	1	1	1	1	1	1	1	1	1	1
Points	3	3	6	9	10	13	14	17	20	23	23	24	25	28	31	34	35	36	39	42	45	48	49	52	53	56	59	62	65	68	69	70	73	73	73	76

Source: Worldfootball
A = Away; H = Home; W = Win; D = Draw; L = Loss

==== Matches ====
19 July 2009 1	Red Bull Salzburg	2–1	Austria Wien	Wals-Siezenheim
17:00 CEST (UTC+2)	Zickler 71'; Švento (yellow card) 89'; Tchoyi 90'	Report	Standfest (yellow card) 8'; Junuzović 28'; Ortlechner (yellow card) 34'	Stadium: Red Bull Arena; Attendance: 12,465; Referee: Dietmar Drabek; Assistant referees: Roland Brandner, Andreas Feichtinger

25 July 2009 2	Ried	1–0	Red Bull Salzburg	Ried im Innkreis
19:30 CEST (UTC+2)	Glasner (yellow card) 66'; Salihi 87'	Report	Tchoyi (yellow card) 60'; Dudić (yellow card) 90'	Stadium: Fill Metallbau Stadion; Attendance: 6,393; Referee: Thomas Gangl; Assistant referees: Senad Cerimagic, Matthias Winsauer

1 August 2009 3	Red Bull Salzburg	3–2	LASK Linz	Wals-Siezenheim
19:30 CEST (UTC+2)	Tchoyi 40'; Leitgeb (yellow card) 42'; Janko 62', (yellow card) 90'; Sekagya (yellow card) 68'; Zickler 72'	Report	Prager 45'; Mayrleb 46'; Alunderis (yellow card) 57'; Chinchilla (yellow card) 68'; Bubenik (yellow card) 88'; Piermayr (yellow card) 89'; Bichelhuber (yellow card) 90'	Stadium: Red Bull Arena; Attendance: 11,422; Referee: Konrad Plautz; Assistant referees: Andreas Heiß, Andreas Staudinger

8 August 2009 4	Mattersburg	2–3	Red Bull Salzburg	Mattersburg
19:30 CEST (UTC+2)	Pauschenwein (yellow card) 13'; Malić (yellow card) 31'; Sedloski 48', (yellow card) 48'; Spuller 49'; Mörz (red card) 80'; Waltner (red card) 83'	Report	Leitgeb (yellow card) 15'; Nelisse 39'; Švento 50'; Aufhauser (yellow card) 80'; Dudić (yellow card) 80'; Cziommer (penalty missed) 84', 84'	Stadium: Pappelstadion; Attendance: 6,187; Referee: Fritz Stuchlik; Assistant referees: Alain Hoxha, Julian Weinberger

22 August 2009 5	Wiener Neustadt	1–1	Red Bull Salzburg	Wiener Neustadt
19:30 CEST (UTC+2)	Aigner 9'	Report	Janko 40'	Stadium: Stadion Wiener Neustadt; Attendance: 4,045; Referee: Rene Eisner; Assistant referees: Klaus Strasser, Bernd Eigler

29 August 2009 6	Red Bull Salzburg	4–0	Kapfenberger SV	Wals-Siezenheim
19:30 CEST (UTC+2)	Zickler 11'; Tchoyi 14'; Cziommer 36'; Pokrivač 61'; Janko (yellow card) 84'; Švento (yellow card) 85'	Report	Hüttenbrenner (yellow card) 49'; Siegl (yellow card) 77'	Stadium: Red Bull Arena; Attendance: 8,922; Referee: Harald Lechner; Assistant referees: Harald Lederer, Julian Weinberger

13 September 2009 7	Rapid Wien	2–2	Red Bull Salzburg	Vienna
16:00 CEST (UTC+2)	Hofmann 58'; Salihi 84'; Heikkinen (yellow card) 90'	Report	Ulmer (yellow card) 35'; Tchoyi 38'; Švento 39'; Sekagya (yellow card) 61'; Augustinussen (yellow card) 89'	Stadium: Gerhard Hanappi Stadium; Attendance: 16,060; Referee: Thomas Gangl; Assistant referees: Mario Strudl, Matthias Winsauer

23 September 2009 8	Red Bull Salzburg	4–2	Sturm Graz	Wals-Siezenheim
19:30 CEST (UTC+2)	Afolabi 26'; Tchoyi 32'; Ulmer (yellow card) 36'; Janko 45', 46'; Pokrivač (yellow card) 50'; Schiemer (yellow card) 87'	Report	Beichler 13', 38', (yellow card) 90'; Feldhofer (yellow card) 63'; Bukva (yellow card) 90'	Stadium: Red Bull Arena; Attendance: 11,848; Referee: Gerhard Grobelnik; Assistant referees: Markus Mayr, Harald Lederer

26 September 2009 9	Austria Kärnten	1–2	Red Bull Salzburg	Klagenfurt
18:00 CEST (UTC+2)	Hiden 83'; Sand (yellow card) 85', (penalty missed) 89'; Hinum (yellow card) 88'	Report	Pokrivač 60'; Janko (yellow card) 70'; Tchoyi 76', (yellow card) 76'; Švento (yellow card) 84'	Stadium: Hypo-Arena; Attendance: 8,751; Referee: Markus Hameter; Assistant referees: Markus Mayr, Christian Trunner

4 October 2009 10	Red Bull Salzburg	7–1	Austria Kärnten	Wals-Siezenheim
18:00 CEST (UTC+2)	Leitgeb 3'; Pokrivač 34'; Janko 41', 48', 50', 79'; Vladavić 67' (pen.); Zickler (yellow card) 90'	Report	Živný (yellow card) 33'; Blanchard 38', (yellow card) 42'; Mair (yellow card) 45'	Stadium: Red Bull Arena; Attendance: 9,885; Referee: Rene Eisner; Assistant referees: Klaus Strasser, Gerald Bauernfeind

17 October 2009 11	Austria Wien	1–0	Red Bull Salzburg	Vienna
18:00 CEST (UTC+2)	Junuzović 20'; Diabang (penalty missed) 63'; Hattenberger (yellow card) 90'	Report	Cziommer (yellow card) 58'; Pokrivač (yellow card) (yellow-red card) 63'; Schiemer (yellow card) 83'	Stadium: Franz Horr Stadium; Attendance: 8,530; Referee: Dietmar Drabek; Assistant referees: Bernhard Zauner, Roland Brandner

25 October 2009 12	Red Bull Salzburg	1–1	Ried	Wals-Siezenheim
18:00 CET (UTC+1)	Cziommer (yellow card) 75'; Leitgeb 79'	Report	Hadžić 45'; Drechsel (yellow card) 68'; Glasner (yellow card) 78'; Brenner (yellow card) 90'	Stadium: Red Bull Arena; Attendance: 13,947; Referee: Alain Bieri (Switzerland); Assistant referees: Antonio Fernandez (Switzerland), Walter Brosi (Switzerland)

28 October 2009 13	LASK Linz	0–0	Red Bull Salzburg	Linz
18:30 CET (UTC+1)		Report	Cziommer (yellow card) 78'; Sekagya (yellow card) 87'; Afolabi (yellow card) 90'	Stadium: Linzer Stadion; Attendance: 8,984; Referee: Fritz Stuchlik; Assistant referees: Alain Hoxha, Julian Weinberger

31 October 2009 14	Red Bull Salzburg	2–0	Mattersburg	Wals-Siezenheim
18:00 CET (UTC+1)	Janko 42'; Schiemer 61', (yellow card) 80'	Report	Schmidt (yellow card) 31'; Mörz (yellow card) 66'; Stjepanović (yellow card) 68'	Stadium: Red Bull Arena; Attendance: 8,604; Referee: Harald Lechner; Assistant referees: Alain Hoxha, Julian Weinberger

8 November 2009 15	Wiener Neustadt	2–3	Red Bull Salzburg	Wiener Neustadt
18:00 CET (UTC+1)	Aigner 26'; Wolf (yellow card) 51'; Reiter 59'	Report	Janko 19'; Pokrivač 55', (yellow card) 90'; Leitgeb 57'; Ulmer (yellow card) 60'	Stadium: Stadion Wiener Neustadt; Attendance: 2,340; Referee: Oliver Drachta; Assistant referees: Bernhard Zauner, Andreas Feichtinger

21 November 2009 16	Kapfenberger SV	0–2	Red Bull Salzburg	Kapfenberg
18:00 CET (UTC+1)	Fukal (yellow card) 18'; Scharrer (yellow card) 28'; Heinz (yellow card) 31'; Osoinik (yellow card) 73'	Report	Leitgeb 65'; Schwegler (yellow card) 82'; Opdam 90'	Stadium: Franz Fekete Stadium; Attendance: 3,000; Referee: Thomas Prammer; Assistant referees: Bernhard Zauner, Andreas Feichtinger

29 November 2009 17	Red Bull Salzburg	0–0	Rapid Wien	Wals-Siezenheim
15:30 CET (UTC+1)	Sekagya (yellow card) 62'; Zickler (yellow card) 77'	Report	Dober (yellow card) 71'	Stadium: Red Bull Arena; Attendance: 23,600; Referee: Robert Schörgenhofer; Assistant referees: Roland Heim, Mario Strudl

6 December 2009 18	Sturm Graz	0–0	Red Bull Salzburg	Graz
15:30 CET (UTC+1)		Report	Afolabi (yellow card) 87'	Stadium: UPC-Arena; Attendance: 10,790; Referee: Dietmar Drabek; Assistant referees: Roland Brandner, Philipp Aiginger

11 December 2009 19	Red Bull Salzburg	1–0	Austria Kärnten	Wals-Siezenheim
19:30 CET (UTC+1)	Sollbauer 89' (o.g.)	Report	Sand (yellow card) 36'	Stadium: Red Bull Arena; Attendance: 13,000; Referee: Gerhard Grobelnik; Assistant referees: Andreas Fellinger, Harald Ruiss

13 February 2010 20	Ried	1–2	Red Bull Salzburg	Ried im Innkreis
18:00 CET (UTC+1)	Lexa (yellow card) 20'; Mader (yellow card) 45'; Nuhiu 52'; Gebauer (yellow card) 55'; Brenner (yellow card) 62'	Report	Janko 2', 43', (yellow card) 61'; Schiemer (yellow card) 62'	Stadium: Fill Metallbau Stadion; Attendance: 4,200; Referee: Rene Eisner; Assistant referees: Klaus Strasser, Bernd Eigler

21 February 2010 21	Red Bull Salzburg	3–0	LASK Linz	Wals-Siezenheim
15:30 CET (UTC+1)	Wallner 9'; Švento 25', 54'; Nelisse (yellow card) 89'	Report	Panis (yellow card) 62'; Majabvi (yellow card) 70'	Stadium: Red Bull Arena; Attendance: 11,800; Referee: Alexander Harkam; Assistant referees: Gerd Adanitsch, Gerald Bauernfeind

28 February 2010 22	Rapid Wien	0–1	Red Bull Salzburg	Vienna
15:30 CET (UTC+1)	Katzer (yellow card) 36'	Report	Schiemer (yellow card) (yellow-red card) 56'; Schwegler (yellow card) 60'; Afolabi (yellow card) 67'	Stadium: Gerhard Hanappi Stadium; Attendance: 17,400; Referee: Dietmar Drabek; Assistant referees: Roland Brandner, Andreas Feichtinger

6 March 2010 23	Red Bull Salzburg	1–1	Wiener Neustadt	Wals-Siezenheim
18:00 CET (UTC+1)	Wallner 39'	Report	Šimkovič (yellow card) 41'; Ramsebner (yellow card) 54'; Aigner 83'	Stadium: Red Bull Arena; Attendance: 8,800; Referee: Thomas Gangl; Assistant referees: Matthias Winsauer, Johannes König

13 March 2010 24	Red Bull Salzburg	1–0	Kapfenberger SV	Wals-Siezenheim
18:00 CET (UTC+1)	Janko 15'; Pokrivač (yellow card) 68'	Report	Rauscher (yellow card) 66'; Heinz (yellow card) (yellow-red card) 90'	Stadium: Red Bull Arena; Attendance: 7,600; Referee: Oliver Drachta; Assistant referees: Roland Brandner, Bernhard Zauner

21 March 2010 25	Austria Wien	1–1	Red Bull Salzburg	Vienna
15:30 CET (UTC+1)	Linz 21', (penalty missed) 29'; Sulimani (yellow card) 45'; Junuzović (yellow card) 74'	Report	Janko (yellow card) 3'; Schiemer (yellow card) 28'; Dudić (yellow card) 31'; Zickler (yellow card) 77', (goal) 81'; Schwegler (yellow card) 79'	Stadium: Franz Horr Stadium; Attendance: 9,000; Referee: Robert Schörgenhofer; Assistant referees: Mario Strudl, Hüseyin Ayhan

24 March 2010 26	Red Bull Salzburg	3–0	Sturm Graz	Wals-Siezenheim
19:30 CET (UTC+1)	Švento 25'; Wallner 28'; Leitgeb 49'; Pokrivač (yellow card) 90'	Report	Lavrič (penalty missed) 59'; Prawda (yellow card) 84'	Stadium: Red Bull Arena; Attendance: 12,600; Referee: Gerhard Grobelnik; Assistant referees: Alain Hoxha, Harald Lederer

27 March 2010 27	Mattersburg	1–6	Red Bull Salzburg	Mattersburg
18:00 CET (UTC+1)	Mörz (yellow card) 18'; Doleschal (yellow card) 30'; Waltner 77'; Spuller (yellow card) 88'	Report	Wallner (yellow card) 19', (goal) 30' (pen.); Cziommer 22'; Opdam (yellow card) 49'; Schiemer 54'; Tchoyi 61'; Schwegler 67'; Janko 69'	Stadium: Pappelstadion; Attendance: 4,500; Referee: Thomas Prammer; Assistant referees: Andreas Fellinger, Harald Ruiss

2 April 2010 28	Red Bull Salzburg	2–0	Mattersburg	Wals-Siezenheim
20:30 CEST (UTC+2)	Afolabi (yellow card) 45'; Janko 61', 89'	Report	Naumoski (yellow card) 5'; Doleschal (yellow card) 70'; Schmidt (yellow card) 77'; Pauschenwein (yellow card) 80'; Farkas (yellow card) (yellow-red card) 82'; Bliem (yellow card) 89'	Stadium: Red Bull Arena; Attendance: 10,850; Referee: Thomas Einwaller; Assistant referees: Roland Heim, Andreas Heiß

10 April 2010 29	Austria Kärnten	0–2	Red Bull Salzburg	Klagenfurt
18:00 CEST (UTC+2)	Sollbauer (yellow card) 67'; Salvatore (yellow card) 90'	Report	Dudić (yellow card) 41'; Cziommer 45'; Švento (yellow card) 52'; Leitgeb (yellow card) 71'; Tchoyi 88'	Stadium: Wörthersee Stadion; Attendance: 4,300; Referee: Oliver Drachta; Assistant referees: Andreas Rothmann, Clemens Schüttengruber

14 April 2010 30	Red Bull Salzburg	2–0	Ried	Wals-Siezenheim
20:30 CEST (UTC+2)	Cziommer 13'; Leitgeb (yellow card) 32'; Hadžić 49' (o.g.)	Report	Burgstaller (yellow card) 27'; Brenner (yellow card) 28'; Hadžić (yellow card) 58'	Stadium: Red Bull Arena; Attendance: 9,800; Referee: Markus Hameter; Assistant referees: Christian Trunner, Senad Cerimagic

18 April 2010 31	LASK Linz	0–0	Red Bull Salzburg	Linz
15:30 CEST (UTC+2)	Majabvi (yellow card) 2'; Kragl (yellow card) 43'	Report	Cziommer (yellow card) 40'; Leitgeb (yellow card) 43'; Afolabi (yellow card) 47'; Schwegler (yellow card) 63'; Schiemer (yellow card) 78'	Stadium: Linzer Stadion; Attendance: 10,800; Referee: Harald Lechner; Assistant referees: Andreas Fellinger, Christian Trunner

23 April 2010 32	Red Bull Salzburg	1–1	Rapid Wien	Wals-Siezenheim
20:30 CEST (UTC+2)	Schwegler (yellow card) 53'; Afolabi 84'; Janko (yellow card) 86'	Report	Thonhofer (yellow card) 38'; Heikkinen (yellow card) 47'; Eder (yellow card) 54'; Hofmann 56'; Dober (yellow card) 88'	Stadium: Red Bull Arena; Attendance: 26,800; Referee: Thomas Einwaller; Assistant referees: Roland Heim, Armin Eder

1 May 2010 33	Red Bull Salzburg	4–2	Wiener Neustadt	Wals-Siezenheim
18:00 CEST (UTC+2)	Janko 11' (pen.), 23'; Dudić 20', (yellow card) 71'; Afolabi 27'	Report	Grünwald 2'; Haselberger (yellow card) 70'; Gërçaliu (yellow card) 85'; Kurtiši 90'	Stadium: Red Bull Arena; Attendance: 11,500; Referee: Alexander Harkam; Assistant referees: Klaus Strasser, Bernd Eigler

4 May 2010 34	Kapfenberger SV	2–0	Red Bull Salzburg	Kapfenberg
20:30 CEST (UTC+2)	Gansterer (yellow card) 6'; Sencar 11', (yellow card) 21'; Felfernig (yellow card) 29'; Schönberger (red card) 37'; Alar 70'	Report	Janko (penalty missed) 40'	Stadium: Franz Fekete Stadium; Attendance: 2,900; Referee: Robert Schörgenhofer; Assistant referees: Helmut Trattnig, Johannes König

9 May 2010 35	Red Bull Salzburg	0–1	Austria Wien	Wals-Siezenheim
16:00 CEST (UTC+2)	Janko (yellow card) 56'; Opdam (yellow card) 63'; Schwegler (yellow card) 79'; Zickler (yellow card) 84'	Report	Schumacher (yellow card) 74'; Hattenberger (yellow card) 85'; Junuzović 90'	Stadium: Red Bull Arena; Attendance: 20,800; Referee: Dietmar Drabek; Assistant referees: Roland Brandner, Andreas Feichtinger

13 May 2010 36	Sturm Graz	0–2	Red Bull Salzburg	Graz
16:00 CEST (UTC+2)	Feldhofer (yellow card) 15'; Bukva (yellow card) 25'; Ehrenreich (yellow card) 54'; Hlinka (yellow card) 63'	Report	Cziommer 14'; Wallner 16'; Schiemer (yellow card) 60'; Sekagya (yellow card) 71'	Stadium: UPC-Arena; Attendance: 15,400; Referee: Thomas Gangl; Assistant referees: Mario Strudl, Matthias Winsauer

=== Austrian Cup ===
15 August 2009 First round	Vorwärts Steyr	1–7	Red Bull Salzburg	Steyr
17:00 CEST (UTC+2)	Rothbauer (yellow card) 34'; Mehlem (yellow card) 37'; Vogel 89'	Report	Rakić 5', 13', 14', 75'; Nelisse 47', 65'; Sekagya 53'; Cziommer (yellow card) 89'	Stadium: Vorwärts Stadium; Attendance: 6,750; Referee: Harald Lechner; Assistant referees: Norbert Hörmayer, Robert Trappl

20 September 2009 Second round	Grödig	0–1	Red Bull Salzburg	Grödig
15:00 CEST (UTC+2)	Schubert (yellow card) 77'	Report	Aufhauser 34'; Ježek (yellow card) 43'; Dudić (yellow card) 72'; Ulmer (yellow card) 77'	Stadium: Untersberg-Arena; Attendance: 2,100; Referee: Andreas Heiß; Assistant referees: Armin Eder, Roland Brandner

10 February 2010 Third round	Sturm Graz	2–0	Red Bull Salzburg	Graz
20:30 CET (UTC+1)	Lavrič 52'; Hlinka (yellow card) 55'; Hölzl (yellow card) 73'; Kienast 84', (yellow card) 89'	Report	Ulmer (yellow card) 3'; Sekagya (yellow card) 19'; Gustafsson (yellow card) 20'; Leitgeb (yellow card) 24'; Cziommer (yellow card) 88'	Stadium: UPC-Arena; Attendance: 4,528; Referee: Gerhard Grobelnik; Assistant referees: Andreas Fellinger, Harald Ruiss

=== UEFA Champions League ===
==== Qualifying ====
===== Second qualifying round =====
15 July 2009 First leg	Red Bull Salzburg (Austria)	1–1	(Republic of Ireland) Bohemians	Wals-Siezenheim, Austria
20:30 CEST (UTC+2)	Dudić 25'; Janko (penalty missed) 58'; Sekagya (yellow card) 68'	Report	N'Do 60'	Stadium: Red Bull Arena; Attendance: 10,229; Referee: Nicolai Vollquartz (Denmark); Assistant referees: Torben Jensen (Denmark), Lars Rix (Denmark); Fourth official: Jakob Kehlet (Denmark)

22 July 2009 Second leg	Bohemians (Republic of Ireland)	0–1 (1–2 agg.)	(Austria) Red Bull Salzburg	Dublin, Ireland
19:30 IST (UTC+1)	Murphy (yellow card) 68'	Report	Janko (yellow card) 54'; Ježek 86'; Schwegler (yellow card) 90+1'; Gustafsson (yellow card) 90+3'	Stadium: Dalymount Park; Attendance: 5,944; Referee: Aleksandar Stavrev (Macedonia); Assistant referees: Ljubomir Krstevski (Macedonia), Marjan Kirovski (Macedonia); Fourth official: Dimitar Meckarovski (Macedonia)
Note: Red Bull Salzburg won 2–1 on aggregate.

===== Third qualifying round =====
29 July 2009 First leg	Red Bull Salzburg (Austria)	1–1	(Croatia) Dinamo Zagreb	Wals-Siezenheim, Austria
20:30 CEST (UTC+2)	Vladavić (yellow card) 26'; Zickler 45'; Augustinussen (yellow card) 53'; Janko (yellow card) 77'; Dudić (yellow card) 88'; Schiemer (yellow card) 90+4'	Report	Mandžukić (yellow card) 30' (yellow-red card) 90+4', (goal) 63'; Etto (yellow card) 60'; Papadopoulos (yellow card) 70'	Stadium: Red Bull Arena; Attendance: 13,608; Referee: Pavel Královec (Czech Republic); Assistant referees: Miroslav Zlamal (Czech Republic), Martin Wilczek (Czech Republic); Fourth official: Michal Paták (Czech Republic)

4 August 2009 Second leg	Dinamo Zagreb (Croatia)	1–2 (2–3 agg.)	(Austria) Red Bull Salzburg	Zagreb, Croatia
20:15 CEST (UTC+2)	Papadopoulos 47'; Lovren (yellow card) 69'; Slepička (yellow card) 80'	Report	Švento 33'; Sekagya (yellow card) 61'; Nelisse 83'	Stadium: Stadion Maksimir; Attendance: 10,243; Referee: Alain Hamer (Luxembourg); Assistant referees: François Mangen (Luxembourg), Christian Holtgen (Luxembourg); Fourth official: Albert Toussaint (Luxembourg)
Note: Red Bull Salzburg won 3–2 on aggregate.

==== Play-off round ====
19 August 2009 First leg	Red Bull Salzburg (Austria)	1–2	(Israel) Maccabi Haifa	Wals-Siezenheim, Austria
20:45 CEST (UTC+2)	Augustinussen (yellow card) 56'; Zickler 57'; Schwegler (yellow card) 66'	Report	Meshumar (yellow card) 17'; Ghadir 22'; Keinan (yellow card) 72'; Arbeitman 84'; Masilela (yellow card) 88'	Stadium: Red Bull Arena; Attendance: 21,260; Referee: Yuri Baskakov (Russia); Assistant referees: Tikhon Kalugin (Russia), Anton Averianov (Russia); Fourth official: Maksim Layushkin (Russia)

25 August 2009 Second leg	Maccabi Haifa (Israel)	3–0 (5–1 agg.)	(Austria) Red Bull Salzburg	Ramat Gan, Israel (Note: The match was played at the Ramat Gan Stadium in Tel Aviv District, instead of Maccabi Haifa regular stadium, the Kiryat Eliezer Stadium in Haifa, which did not meet UEFA requirements.)
21:45 IDT (UTC+3)	Culma (yellow card) 22'; B. Kayal (yellow card) 25'; Dvalishvili 31'; Golasa 57'; Ghadir 90'	Report	Cziommer (yellow card) 21'	Stadium: Ramat Gan Stadium; Attendance: 31,700; Referee: Bertrand Layec (France); Assistant referees: Michael Annonier (France), David Benech (France); Fourth official: Philippe Kalt (France)
Note: Maccabi Haifa won 5–1 on aggregate.

=== UEFA Europa League ===
==== Group stage ====
Pos	Team	Pld	W	D	L	GF	GA	GD	Pts	Qualification	SBG	VIL	LAZ	LS
1	(Austria) Red Bull Salzburg	6	6	0	0	9	2	+7	18	Advance to knockout phase	—	2–0	2–1	1–0
2	(Spain) Villarreal	6	3	0	3	8	6	+2	9	Advance to knockout phase	0–1	—	4–1	1–0
3	(Italy) Lazio	6	2	0	4	9	10	−1	6		1–2	2–1	—	0–1
4	(Bulgaria) Levski Sofia	6	1	0	5	1	9	−8	3		0–1	0–2	0–4	—

Source: Soccerway

17 September 2009 1	Lazio (Italy)	1–2	(Austria) Red Bull Salzburg	Rome, Italy
21:05 CEST (UTC+2)	Foggia 59'; Cruz (yellow card) 61'; Mauri (yellow card) 72'; Zárate (yellow card) 89'	Report	Schiemer (yellow card) 56', (goal) 82'; Schwegler (yellow card) 90+1'; Janko 90+3'	Stadium: Stadio Olimpico; Attendance: 12,600; Referee: Saïd Ennjimi (France); Assistant referees: Frédéric Cano (France), Djemel Zitouni (France); Fourth official: Didier Falcone (France); Goal-line assistants: Hervé Piccirillo (France), Ruddy Buquet (France)

1 October 2009 2	Red Bull Salzburg (Austria)	2–0	(Spain) Villarreal	Wals-Siezenheim, Austria
19:00 CEST (UTC+2)	Janko 21'; Tchoyi 84'	Report	Ángel (yellow card) 20'; Rodríguez (yellow card) 49'	Stadium: Red Bull Arena; Attendance: 18,800; Referee: Costas Kapitanis (Cyprus); Assistant referees: Andreas Xanthou (Cyprus), Michael Soteriou (Cyprus); Fourth official: Ioannis Anastasiou (Cyprus); Goal-line assistants: Leontios Trattou (Cyprus), Panayiotis Kailis (Cyprus)

22 October 2009 3	Red Bull Salzburg (Austria)	1–0	(Bulgaria) Levski Sofia	Wals-Siezenheim, Austria
19:00 CEST (UTC+2)	Švento 45+2'; Pokrivač (yellow card) 64'	Report	Baltanov (yellow card) 25'; Yovov (yellow card) 45+1'; Petkov (yellow card) 80'	Stadium: Red Bull Arena; Attendance: 17,800; Referee: Hannes Kaasik (Estonia); Assistant referees: Jaanus Mutli, Dmitri Vinogradov; Fourth official: Eiko Saar; Goal-line assistants: Sten Kaldma, Kristo Tohver

5 November 2009 4	Levski Sofia (Bulgaria)	0–1	(Austria) Red Bull Salzburg	Sofia, Bulgaria
22:05 EET (UTC+2)	Bardon (yellow card) 33'; Sarmov (red card) 62'; Rabeh (yellow card) 90'	Report	Zickler (yellow card) 90'; Schiemer 90+3', (yellow card) 90+3'	Stadium: Georgi Asparuhov Stadium; Attendance: 5,000; Referee: Cüneyt Çakır (Turkey); Assistant referees: Bahattin Duran, Alpaslan Dedeş; Fourth official: Süleyman Abay; Goal-line assistants: Hüseyin Göçek, Halis Özkahya

2 December 2009 5	Red Bull Salzburg (Austria)	2–1	(Italy) Lazio	Wals-Siezenheim, Austria
19:00 CET (UTC+1)	Afolabi 52'; Pokrivač (yellow card) 71'; Tchoyi 78'	Report	Muslera (yellow card) 32'; Eliseu (yellow card) 34'; Diakité (yellow card) 38'; Brocchi (yellow card) 51'; Foggia 57', (yellow card) 79'; Mauri (yellow card) 68'; Zárate (yellow card) 81'	Stadium: Red Bull Arena; Attendance: 26,270; Referee: Alexandru Tudor (Romania); Assistant referees: Cristian Nica (Romania), Aurel Oniţă (Romania); Fourth official: Radu Petrescu (Romania); Goal-line assistants: Ovidiu Hațegan (Romania), Marius Avram (Romania)

17 December 2009 6	Villarreal (Spain)	0–1	(Austria) Red Bull Salzburg	Villarreal, Spain
21:05 CET (UTC+1)	Rodríguez (yellow card) 28'; Pereira (yellow card) 51'	Report	Švento 7'; Schwegler (yellow card) 34'; Cziommer (yellow card) 76'	Stadium: El Madrigal; Attendance: 5,860; Referee: Vladimír Hriňák (Slovakia); Assistant referees: Roman Slyško (Slovakia), Roman Csabay (Slovakia); Fourth official: Mário Vlk (Slovakia); Goal-line assistants: Vladimir Vnuk (Slovakia), Richard Trutz (Slovakia)

==== Knockout phase ====
===== Round of 32 =====
18 February 2010 First leg	Standard Liège (Belgium)	3–2	(Austria) Red Bull Salzburg	Liège, Belgium
19:00 CET (UTC+1)	Goreux (yellow card) 52'; Witsel 66' (pen.), 82'; De Camargo (yellow card) 75', (goal) 80'	Report	Janko 4', 45'; Schwegler (yellow card) 60'; Schiemer (yellow card) 65'; Leitgeb (yellow card) 90+3'	Stadium: Stade Maurice Dufrasne; Attendance: 20,168; Referee: Cristian Balaj (Romania); Assistant referees: Zoltán Székely (Romania), George Adrian Vidan (Romania); Fourth official: Teodor Crăciunescu (Romania); Goal-line assistants: Augustus Constantin (Romania), István Kovács (Romania)

25 February 2010 Second leg	Red Bull Salzburg (Austria)	0–0 (2–3 agg.)	(Belgium) Standard Liège	Wals-Siezenheim, Austria
21:05 CET (UTC+1)	Cziommer (yellow card) 45'; Sekagya (yellow card) 54'	Report	Witsel (yellow card) 19'; Pocognoli (yellow card) 69'; Carcela (yellow card) 90+4'	Stadium: Red Bull Arena; Attendance: 26,500; Referee: Alan Kelly (Republic of Ireland); Assistant referees: Marc Douglas, Damien MacGraith; Fourth official: Derek Tomney; Goal-line assistants: Anthony Buttimer, Neil Doyle
Note: Standard Liège won 3–2 on aggregate.
