= Nikola Pokrivač =

Croatian footballer (1985–2025)

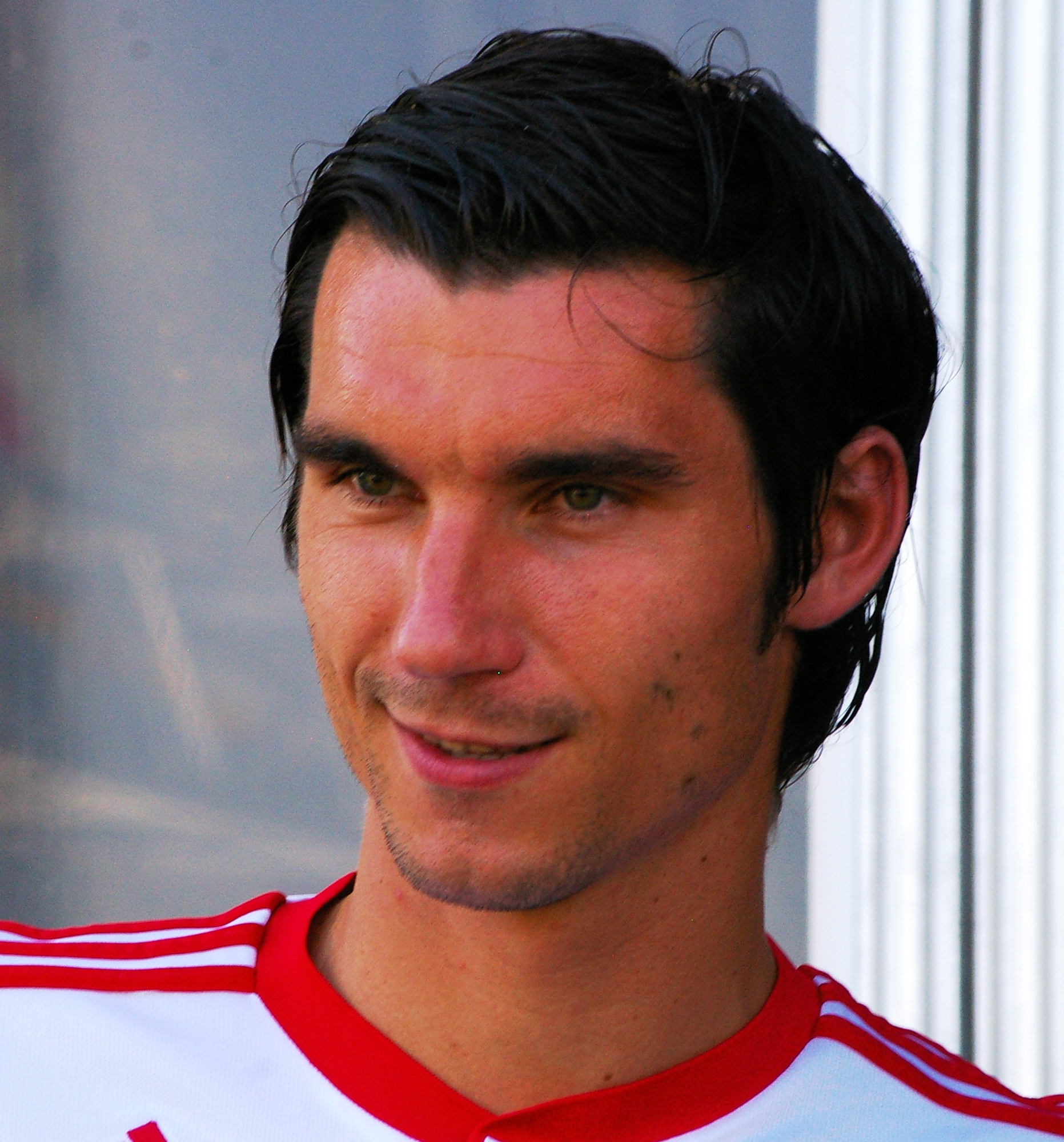
- Pokrivač in 2010

Personal information
- Date of birth: 26 November 1985
- Place of birth: Čakovec, SR Croatia, SFR Yugoslavia
- Date of death: 18 April 2025 (aged 39)
- Place of death: Karlovac, Croatia
- Height: 1.85 m (6 ft 1 in)
- Position: Defensive midfielder

Youth career
- 1995–1997: Bratstvo Jurovec
- 1997–2001: Čakovec
- 2001–2004: Varteks

Senior career*
Years	Team	Apps	(Gls)
2002–2006	NK Varteks	68	(1)
2003–2004	→ Međimurje (loan)		
2007–2008	Dinamo Zagreb	30	(5)
2008–2009	Monaco	32	(2)
2009–2011	Red Bull Salzburg	30	(4)
2011–2013	Dinamo Zagreb	15	(2)
2013	→ Inter Zaprešić (loan)	12	(0)
2013–2014	HNK Rijeka	16	(2)
2014–2015	Shakhter Karagandy	22	(0)
2015–2016	Maccabi Petah Tikva	0	(0)
2016–2017	Slaven Belupo	11	(1)
2021–2023	Pušća	46	(13)
2023–2024	GNK Tigar Sveta Nedelja	27	(0)
2024–2025	Vojnić '95	21	(0)

International career
2005–2006	Croatia U21	8	(0)
2008–2010	Croatia	15	(0)

Managerial career
- 2019: Rudeš (assistant)
- 2021–2022: Ravnice (youth team coach)
- 2022–2023: Pušća (youth team coach)
- 2023–2024: Rudeš (youth team coach)
- * Club domestic league appearances and goals

Nikola Pokrivač (26 November 1985 – 18 April 2025) was a Croatian professional footballer who played as a midfielder.

== Club career ==
=== NK Varteks ===
Pokrivač started to play football with amateur side Bratstvo Jurovec, near his hometown. He went on to continue his youth career with Čakovec and NK Varteks, eventually advancing to the first team at Varteks in the summer of 2004.

Making his senior domestic league debut for Varteks against Zadar on 7 August 2004, Pokrivač went on to establish himself as a regular at the club in 2005. He also appeared in some European matches for the club, playing in the UEFA Intertoto Cup in the summer of 2005 and the UEFA Cup qualifying a year later. In 2006, he also played for Varteks in the two-legged final of the Croatian Cup, where they lost to HNK Rijeka on away goals after a 5–5 draw on aggregate.

=== Dinamo Zagreb ===
His good performances at Varteks eventually secured him a move to Croatia's top club Dinamo Zagreb in the winter break of the 2006–07 season. He quickly became a regular at his new club and also helped them winning both the Croatian league and cup titles in 2007. He also collected further experience in European competitions with Dinamo, making a total of 10 appearances in both the UEFA Champions League qualifying and the UEFA Cup during the first half of the 2007–08 season.

=== Monaco ===
On 30 January 2008, Pokrivač moved to French Ligue 1 side AS Monaco on a four-and-a-half-year contract. He made his league debut on 23 February 2008 in Monaco's 1–1 draw at Paris Saint-Germain, playing the full 90 minutes. He continued to appear regularly for the club over the following two months, until being sent off with a straight red card in the final moments of the club's away match against Nice on 19 April 2008. He made a total of 9 appearances in the Ligue 1 during his first six months with the club.

Struggling to regain his place as a regular with Monaco during his second season with the club, he scored his first goal in the Ligue 1 in Monaco's 3–1 win at home to Nancy on 29 October 2008, also recording an assist in the same match. A month later, he scored the only goal in Monaco's 1–0 win at Auxerre in the Ligue 1. He finished the 2008–09 season with a total of 23 appearances in the Ligue 1. On 4 March 2009, he also scored one goal for Monaco in their 2–0 win at Ajaccio in the Coupe de France round of 16.

=== Red Bull Salzburg ===
On 24 August 2009, it was announced that Pokrivač signed a three-year contract with Austrian side Red Bull Salzburg. He made his debut for the club on 29 August 2009 in their Bundesliga match against SV Kapfenberg, coming on as a substitute for Simon Cziommer in the 55th minute and scoring his first goal for the club when he netted the final goal in Salzburg's 4–0 win six minutes later.

On 26 September 2009, he scored his second Bundesliga goal for Salzburg in their 2–1 win at Austria Kärnten and delivered a superb performance in a 7–1 home win against the same club on 4 October 2009, participating in all of Salzburg's three goals in the first half. He first set up the opening goal of the match for Christoph Leitgeb in the 3rd minute, then scored the second goal in the 34th minute, before setting up the third goal of the match for Marc Janko in the 41st minute.

=== Dinamo Zagreb ===
On 16 August 2011, Pokrivač signed a four-year contract with Dinamo Zagreb.

=== Inter Zaprešić ===
During the 2012–13 winter transfer window, Pokrivač was loaned out to Inter Zaprešić for the remainder of the season.

=== HNK Rijeka ===
On 7 June 2013, Pokrivač signed a two-year contract with HNK Rijeka.

=== Shakhter Karagandy ===
In the summer of 2014, Pokrivač signed for Shakhter Karagandy.

=== Slaven Belupo and the end of professional career ===
Pokrivač was diagnosed with Hodgkin lymphoma in 2015, and, after recovering, joined Slaven Belupo in Croatia. He scored what would prove to be the last goal of his professional career in April 2016, against his former club HNK Rijeka. However, the lymphoma would return, in 2016 and 2017, prompting him to undergo a bone marrow transplant, having received it from his mother, Ana. He announced his retirement from professional football in November 2017, following his final recovery.

=== Amateur football ===
In September 2021, Pokrivač returned to football, albeit amateur, by joining sixth-tier NK Pušća from the eponymous municipality. In his second season at the club, it won the league and the Zaprešić area cup. Subsequently, Pokrivač moved to fifth-tier GNK Tigar in Sveta Nedelja. After a year at GNK Tigar, Pokrivač moved to another fifth-tier club, Vojnić '95.

== International career ==
Pokrivač played for the Croatia under-21 national team and also represented the country at both the under-17 and under-19 levels. He won a total of 39 international caps and scored three goals for all Croatian youth national teams between 2001 and 2006.

On 5 May 2008, he received his first call-up for the Croatia national team at senior level, being added to their 23-man squad for the UEFA Euro 2008 finals in Austria and Switzerland. He went on to make his international debut on 24 May 2008 in a friendly match against Moldova in Rijeka, coming on as a substitute for Niko Kovač in the 59th minute. At the UEFA Euro 2008 finals, he only appeared in Croatia's final group match against Poland, completing the full 90 minutes in a 1–0 victory for Croatia.

Pokrivač went on to make five appearances in Croatia's unsuccessful qualifying campaign for the 2010 FIFA World Cup, appearing in both matches against Kazakhstan and England as well as the away fixture at Andorra. He only started one of the five matches, being in the starting line-up for Croatia in their 5–1 defeat to England at Wembley. However, he was substituted at half-time after a poor performance in the first half.

Pokrivač earned a total of 15 caps, scoring no goals. His final international was an October 2010 friendly against Norway.

== Personal life and death ==
Pokrivač was married to Katarina Pokrivač, with whom he had one daughter. He was diagnosed with Hodgkin lymphoma and underwent treatment.

On the evening of 18 April 2025, Pokrivač died in a traffic collision near Karlovac involving four cars, which also killed another person while three others were hospitalised with serious injuries.

== Career statistics ==
=== Club ===
Appearances and goals by club, season and competition
Club	Season	League			National cup (Note: Includes Croatian Cup, Coupe de France, Austrian Cup, Kazakhstan Cup, Israel State Cup.)		League cup (Note: Includes Coupe de la Ligue.)		Europe		Total	
Club	Season	Division	Apps	Goals	Apps	Goals	Apps	Goals	Apps	Goals	Apps	Goals
NK Varteks	2002–03	Prva HNL	5	0	–		–		–		5	0
NK Varteks	2004–05	Prva HNL	20	1	5	0	–		–		25	1
NK Varteks	2005–06	Prva HNL	28	0	8	1	–		6	0	42	1
NK Varteks	2006–07	Prva HNL	15	0	1	0	–		2	0	18	0
Međimurje Čakovec (loan)	2003–04	Druga HNL	–		–		–		–		0	0
Dinamo Zagreb	2006–07	Prva HNL	13	0	4	0	–		–		17	0
Dinamo Zagreb	2007–08	Prva HNL	17	5	1	0	–		10	0	28	5
Monaco	2007–08	Ligue 1	9	0	–		–		–		9	0
Monaco	2008–09	Ligue 1	24	2	3	1	1	0	–		28	3
Red Bull Salzburg	2009–10	Austrian Bundesliga	22	4	1	0	–		6	0	29	4
Red Bull Salzburg	2010–11	Austrian Bundesliga	8	0	2	2	–		7	1	17	3
Dinamo Zagreb	2011–12	Prva HNL	11	2	4	0	–		1	0	16	2
Dinamo Zagreb	2012–13	Prva HNL	4	0	0	0	–		1	0	5	0
Inter Zaprešić (loan)	2012–13	Prva HNL	12	0	–		–		–		12	0
HNK Rijeka	2013–14	Prva HNL	16	2	2	0	–		8	1	26	3
Shakhter Karagandy	2014	Kazakhstan Premier League	9	0	2	0	–		6	1	17	1
Shakhter Karagandy	2015	Kazakhstan Premier League	13	0	1	0	–		–		14	0
Maccabi Petah Tikva	2015–16	Israeli Premier League	0	0	–		–		–		0	0
Slaven Belupo	2015–16	Prva HNL	7	1	2	1	–		–		9	1
Slaven Belupo	2016–17	Prva HNL	4	0	0	0	–		–		4	0
Slaven Belupo	2017–18	Prva HNL	0	0	–		–		–		0	0
Career total			237	17	36	5	1	0	47	3	321	21

=== International ===
Appearances and goals by national team and year
National team	Year	Apps	Goals
Croatia	2008	5	0
Croatia	2009	6	0
Croatia	2010	4	0
Total		15	0

== Honours ==
Međimurje Čakovec

- Druga HNL: 2003–04

Dinamo Zagreb

- Croatian First Football League: 2006–07, 2007–08, 2011–12
- Croatian Football Cup: 2007, 2008, 2012

Red Bull Salzburg

- Austrian Football Bundesliga: 2009–10

HNK Rijeka

- Croatian Football Cup: 2014
