= Hattenberger =

Hattenberger is a German surname. Notable people with the surname include:

- Matthias Hattenberger (born 1978), Austrian footballer, son of Roland
- Roland Hattenberger (born 1948), Austrian footballer
