= Haselberger =

Haselberger is a German surname. Notable people with the surname include:

- Christian Haselberger (born 1989), Austrian footballer and coach
- Lothar Haselberger, German-American architectural historian, archaeologist, classical scholar, and writer
