= Anton Pauschenwein =

Austrian footballer

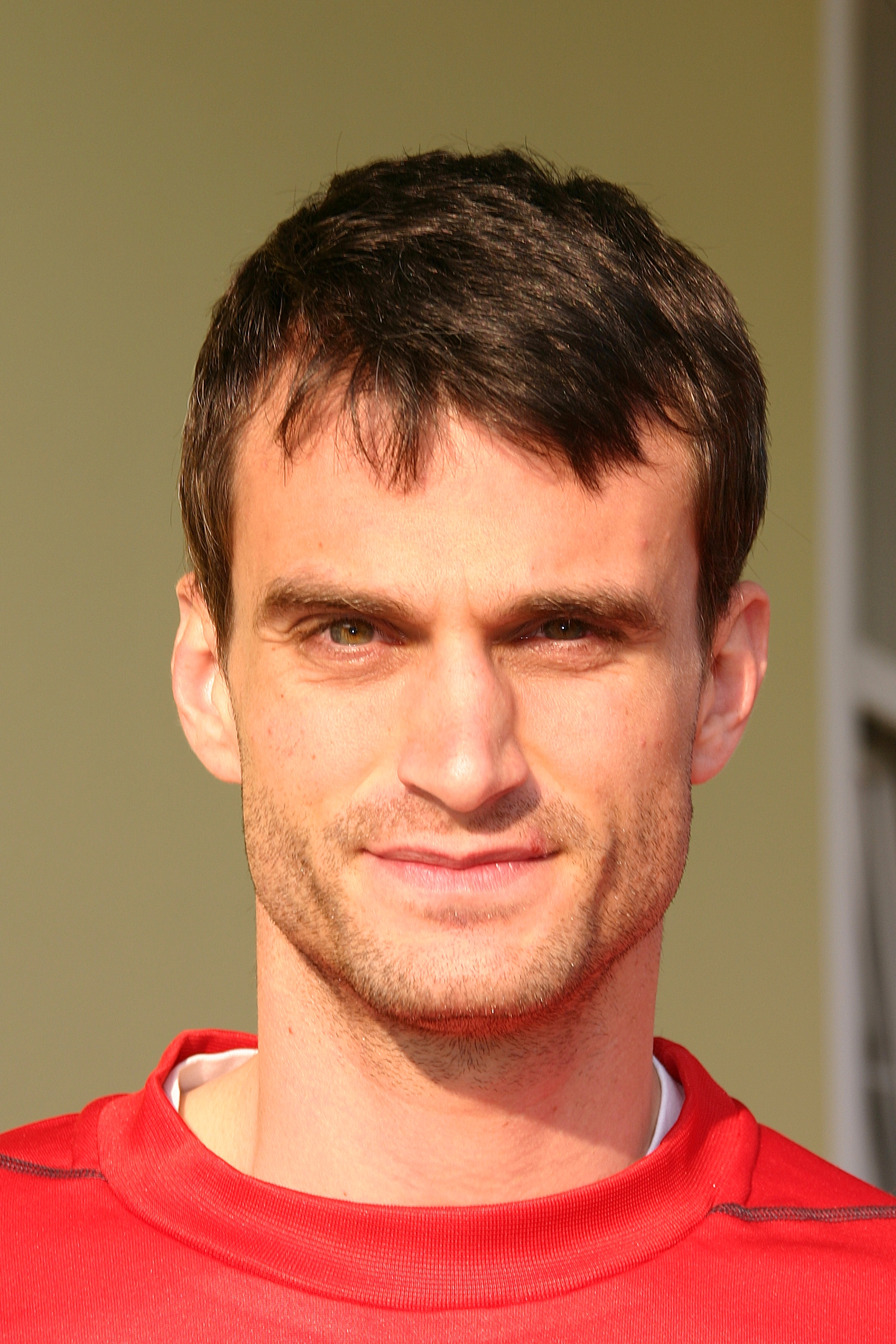

Personal information
- Full name: Anton Pauschenwein
- Date of birth: 24 January 1981 (age 45)
- Place of birth: Eisenstadt, Austria
- Height: 1.82 m (5 ft 11 1/2 in)
- Position: Defender

Senior career*
Years	Team	Apps	(Gls)
2000–2012	Mattersburg	173	(2)

International career
	Austria U-21	1	(0)
- * Club domestic league appearances and goals as of 9 May 2010

Anton Pauschenwein (born 24 January 1981) is an Austrian former professional association footballer, who played for SV Mattersburg. He played as a defender.
