= Christoph Leitgeb =

Austrian footballer

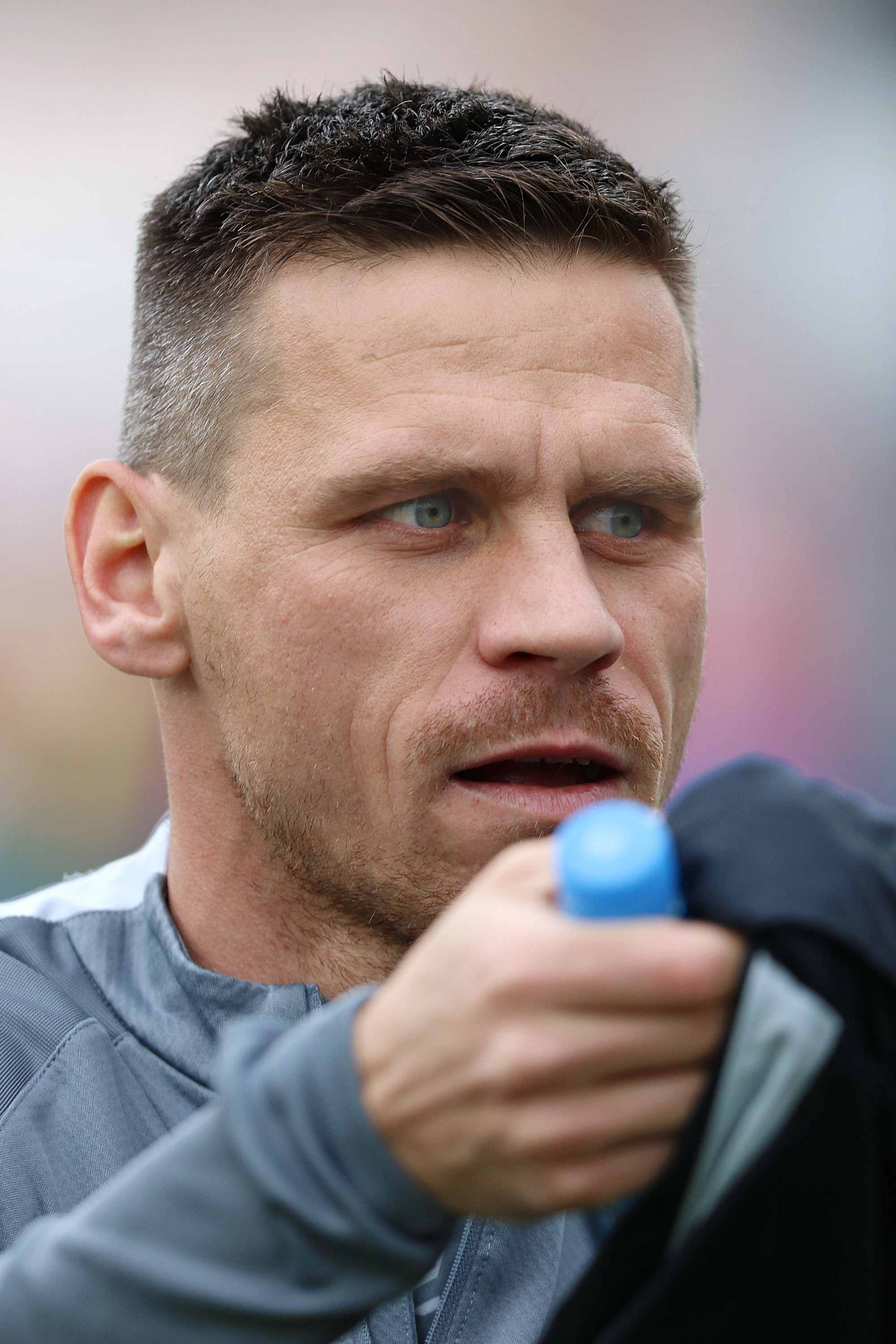
- Leitgeb with Red Bull Salzburg in 2017

Personal information
- Date of birth: 14 April 1985 (age 41)
- Place of birth: Graz, Austria
- Height: 1.72 m (5 ft 8 in)
- Position: Central midfielder

Youth career
- 1991–2003: Sturm Graz

Senior career*
Years	Team	Apps	(Gls)
2003–2005	Sturm Graz Amateure		
2005–2007	Sturm Graz	54	(5)
2007–2019	Red Bull Salzburg	229	(17)
2019–2020	Sturm Graz	4	(0)
Total		287	(22)

International career^{‡}
2006–2014	Austria	41	(0)
- * Club domestic league appearances and goals as of 23 September 2019 ‡ National team caps and goals as of 16 November 2014

Christoph Leitgeb (born 14 April 1985) is an Austrian former professional footballer who played as a midfielder. Leitgeb has represented his country at international level, earning 41 caps, and took part in Euro 2008.

== Club career ==
Born in Graz, Leitgeb began his career in the youth squad of Sturm Graz spending two years there before moving into the first squad during the 2005/06 season. Leitgeb spent two years in the first team before moving to league rivals Red Bull Salzburg in the summer of 2007 for a fee of 1.7 million euros. On 4 August 2020 Leitgeb announced his retirement.

== International career ==
Leitgeb made his debut for Austria on 23 May 2006 in a friendly against Croatia and was a participant at Euro 2008 and played two out of three matches for Austria.

== Career statistics ==
Appearances and goals by club, season and competition
Club	Season	League			Cup		Continental		Total	
Club	Season	Division	Apps	Goals	Apps	Goals	Apps	Goals	Apps	Goals
Sturm Graz	2005–06	Bundesliga	20	1	1	0	—		21	1
Sturm Graz	2006–07	Bundesliga	34	4	0	0	—		34	4
Sturm Graz	Total		54	5	1	0	—		55	5
Red Bull Salzburg	2007–08	Bundesliga	31	4	—		6	0	37	4
Red Bull Salzburg	2008–09	Bundesliga	16	0	1	0	3	0	20	0
Red Bull Salzburg	2009–10	Bundesliga	33	5	1	0	14	0	48	5
Red Bull Salzburg	2010–11	Bundesliga	36	1	1	0	11	0	48	1
Red Bull Salzburg	2011–12	Bundesliga	23	2	3	0	8	0	34	2
Red Bull Salzburg	2012–13	Bundesliga	22	4	3	0	2	0	27	4
Red Bull Salzburg	2013–14	Bundesliga	22	1	5	0	9	0	36	1
Red Bull Salzburg	2014–15	Bundesliga	18	0	3	1	10	0	31	1
Red Bull Salzburg	2015–16	Bundesliga	3	0	0	0	4	0	7	0
Red Bull Salzburg	2016–17	Bundesliga	8	0	3	0	0	0	11	0
Red Bull Salzburg	2017–18	Bundesliga	12	0	2	0	3	0	17	0
Red Bull Salzburg	2018–19	Bundesliga	5	0	2	1	4	1	11	2
Red Bull Salzburg	Total		229	17	24	2	74	1	327	20
Sturm Graz	2019–20	Bundesliga	23	0	1	0	1	0	25	0
Career total			306	22	26	2	75	1	407	25

== Honours ==
Red Bull Salzburg

- Austrian Football Bundesliga: 2008–09, 2009–10, 2011–12, 2013–14, 2014–15, 2015–16
- Austrian Cup: 2011–12, 2013–14, 2014–15, 2015–16
