= Ewald Brenner =

Austrian footballer (born 1975)

Personal information
- Full name: Ewald Brenner
- Date of birth: 26 June 1975 (age 51)
- Place of birth: Freistadt, Austria
- Height: 1.83 m (6 ft 0 in)
- Position: Defender

Team information
- Current team: Viktoria Marchtrenk (Head coach)

Youth career
- 1982–1992: Viktoria Marchtrenk
- 1992–1996: Lins
- 1994–1996: → FC Marchtrenk (cooperation)

Senior career*
Years	Team	Apps	(Gls)
1996–1997	FC Linz	32	(7)
1997–1998	Grazer AK	21	(1)
1998	LASK Linz	12	(1)
1998–1999	Grazer AK	28	(3)
1999–2001	LASK Linz	85	(18)
2001–2002	SV Salzburg	12	(3)
2002	LASK Linz	20	(3)
2002–2004	SV Salzburg	55	(8)
2004–2011	Ried	220	(13)
2011–2012	Union Dietach	18	(2)
2012–2014	Viktoria Marchtrenk	43	(10)

Managerial career
- 2012–2014: Viktoria Marchtrenk (player-manager)
- 2014–2015: Ried (assistant)
- 2016–2018: Viktoria Marchtrenk (U15)
- 2018–: Viktoria Marchtrenk
- * Club domestic league appearances and goals

Ewald Brenner (born 26 June 1975) is an Austrian retired professional association football player who played as a defender and current head coach of ASKÖ SV Viktoria Marchtrenk.

== Career ==
=== Club career ===
Brenner began his active football career with ASKÖ SV Viktoria Marchtrenk. In 1996 he joined the former Austrian Bundesliga club FC Linz as a young player. After the two major Linz clubs LASK and FC Linz merged, he moved to Grazer AK. After only one year in the club, he went back to Linz and played twelve games at LASK. He immediately returned to Graz and played there again for a year. In 1999, Brenner returned to Linz for the second time. After only two years he went to a club outside Upper Austria, namely to Salzburg for SV Austria Salzburg, where he stayed for a year and returned to Linz for the last time. From 2002 to 2004 he was again active at SV Austria Salzburg before he moved to SV Ried in 2004 and had a contract there until the end of the 2010/2011 season. In his last season in Ried, Brenner won the Austrian Cup.

After a season at Union Dietach, Brenner returned to his childhood club ASKÖ SV Viktoria Marchtrenk, who had been relegated to the Bezirksliga Süd for the 2012/13 season, where he was appointed player-manager. He left the position in May 2014, to join SV Ried as an assistant coach under his former Ried teammate Oliver Glasner. He left the club alongside Glasner at the end of the season.

Brenner then returned to Viktoria Marchtrenk after leaving Ried, where he took charge of the club's U15 team. In September 2018, after head coach Dominik Hamader resigned, Brenner took charge of the club's first team once again.
