= Thomas Schönberger =

Austrian footballer

Personal information
- Full name: Thomas Schönberger
- Date of birth: October 14, 1986 (age 40)
- Place of birth: Graz, Austria
- Height: 1.85 m (6 ft 1 in)
- Position: Defender

Senior career*
Years	Team	Apps	(Gls)
2005–2007	Grazer AK	0	(0)
2007	→ Kapfenberg (loan)	12	(0)
2007–2014	Kapfenberg	94	(7)
2014–2016	TSV Hartberg	48	(6)
2016–	SV Allerheiligen	0	(0)
- * Club domestic league appearances and goals as of 12 July 2016

Thomas Schönberger (born October 14, 1986) is an Austrian professional association football player who currently plays for SV Allerheiligen. He plays as a defender.
