= Dominik Doleschal =

Austrian footballer

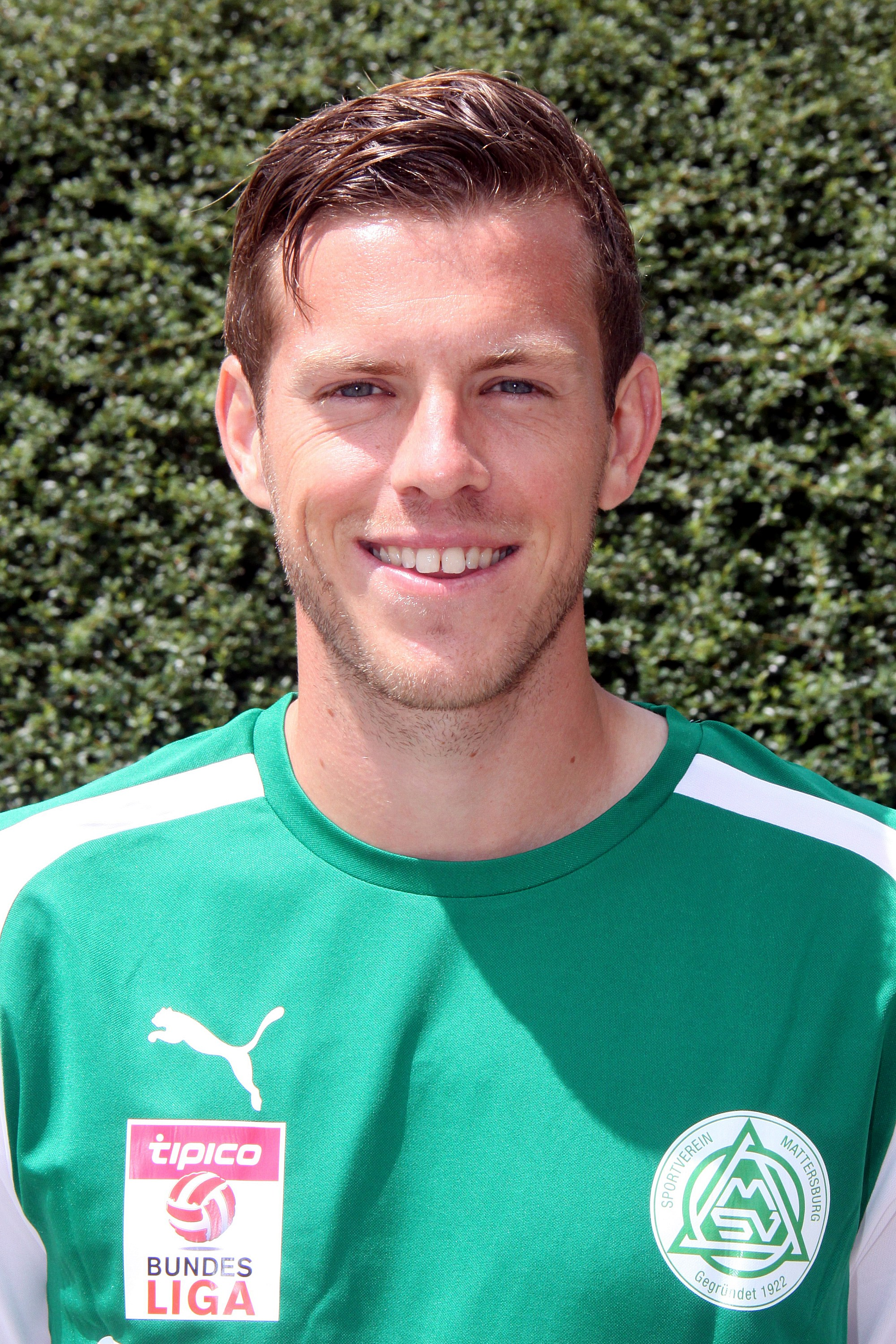

Personal information
- Full name: Dominik Doleschal
- Date of birth: 9 May 1989 (age 37)
- Place of birth: Oberwart, Austria
- Height: 1.89 m (6 ft 2 1/2 in)
- Position: Midfielder

Team information
- Current team: SV Oberwart
- Number: 6

Youth career
- 1998–2003: ASV Deutsch Tschantschendorf
- 2003–2007: BNZ Burgenland

Senior career*
| Years | Team | Apps | (Gls) |
| 2007–2017 | SV Mattersburg | 74 | (6) |
| 2019 | Wiener Neustadt | 0 | (0) |
| 2019– | SV Oberwart | 24 | (2) |
- * Club domestic league appearances and goals as of 13:52, 17 January 2021 (UTC)

Dominik Doleschal (born 9 May 1989) is an Austrian professional association footballer who plays for Austrian Football Second League side SV Oberwart. He plays as a midfielder.

== Career ==
=== Wiener Neustadt ===
In February 2019, Doleschal joined SC Wiener Neustadt.

=== SV Oberwart ===
Five months after his arrival to SC Wiener Neustadt, he left the club and joined SV Oberwart.
