= Milan Dudić =

Serbian footballer

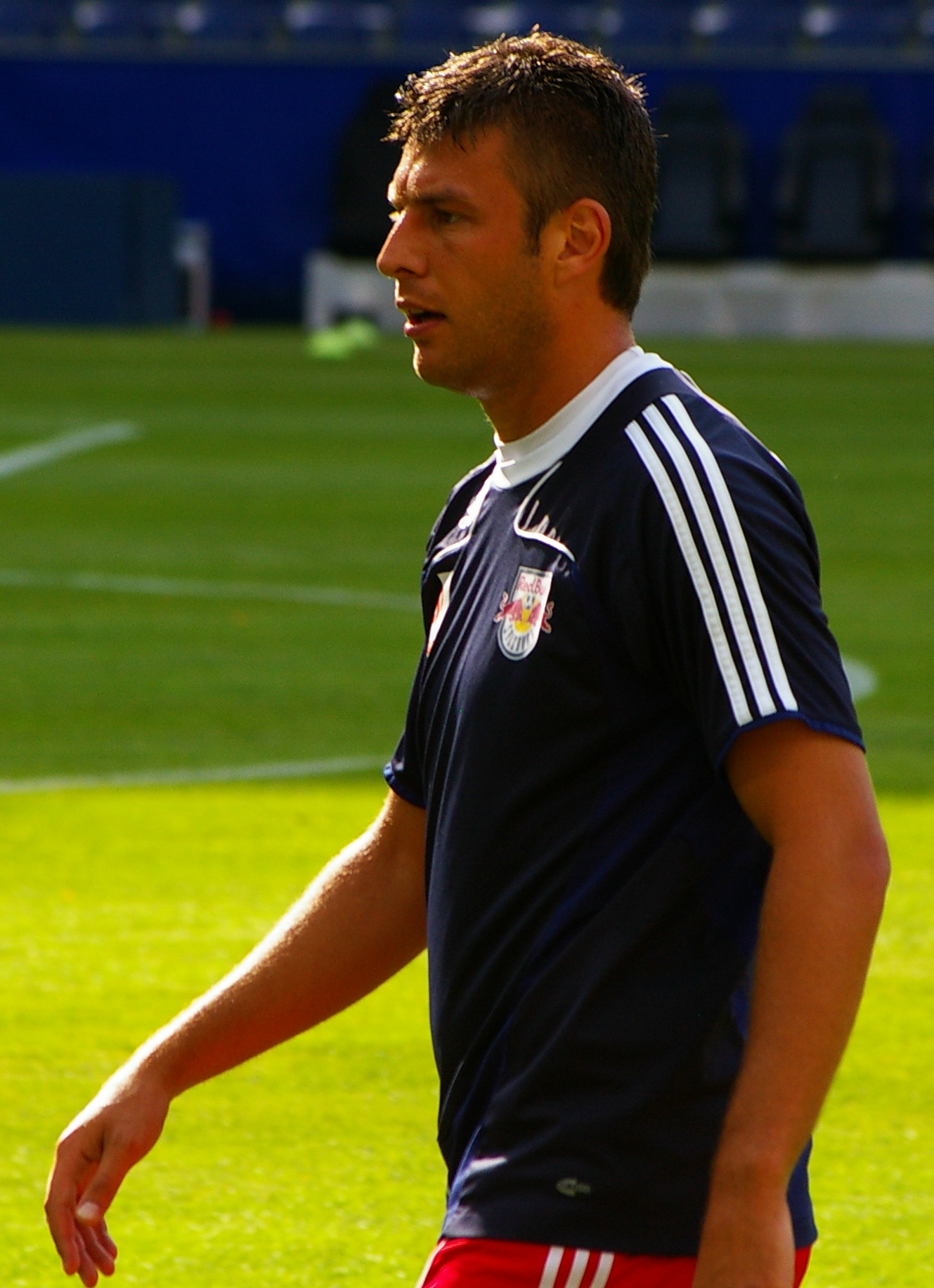
- Dudić with Red Bull Salzburg in 2010

Personal information
- Full name: Milan Dudić
- Date of birth: 1 November 1979 (age 46)
- Place of birth: Kraljevo, SR Serbia, SFR Yugoslavia
- Height: 1.85 m (6 ft 1 in)
- Position: Defender

Youth career
- Magnohrom Kraljevo
- Red Star Belgrade

Senior career*
Years	Team	Apps	(Gls)
1998–2001	Čukarički	64	(5)
2002–2006	Red Star Belgrade	103	(10)
2006–2011	Red Bull Salzburg	86	(7)
2011–2014	Sturm Graz	48	(1)
Total		301	(23)

International career
2000–2001	FR Yugoslavia U21	5	(1)
2001–2006	Serbia and Montenegro	13	(0)
- * Club domestic league appearances and goals

Milan Dudić (Serbian Cyrillic: Милан Дудић; born 1 November 1979) is a Serbian former professional footballer who played as a defender.

== Club career ==
Born in Kraljevo, Dudić started out at local club Magnohrom before briefly joining the youth system of Red Star Belgrade. He signed his first professional contract with Čukarički in 1998. In the 2002 winter transfer window, Dudić was transferred to Red Star Belgrade. He spent four and a half years with the club, winning two championships and three national cups.

In 2006, Dudić moved abroad and signed with Austrian club Red Bull Salzburg. He helped them win three championship titles over five seasons. In 2011, Dudić switched to fellow Bundesliga side Sturm Graz. He retired from playing in 2014.

== International career ==
At international level, Dudić was capped 13 times for Serbia and Montenegro, making his debut in 2001. He was a member of the team at the 2006 FIFA World Cup. In the final game of the group stage against Ivory Coast, Dudić committed two handballs in his own penalty area, resulting in two converted penalties for the opponent in an eventual 3–2 loss.

== Personal life ==
Dudić is the twin brother of fellow footballer Ivan Dudić.

== Career statistics ==
Appearances and goals by national team and year
National team	Year	Apps	Goals
FR Yugoslavia	2001	2	0
FR Yugoslavia	2002	1	0
Serbia and Montenegro	2003	2	0
Serbia and Montenegro	2004	3	0
Serbia and Montenegro	2005	3	0
Serbia and Montenegro	2006	2	0
Total		13	0

== Honours ==
Red Star Belgrade

- First League of Serbia and Montenegro: 2003–04, 2005–06
- Serbia and Montenegro Cup: 2001–02, 2003–04, 2005–06

Red Bull Salzburg

- Austrian Bundesliga: 2006–07, 2008–09, 2009–10
