= Markus Felfernig =

Austrian footballer

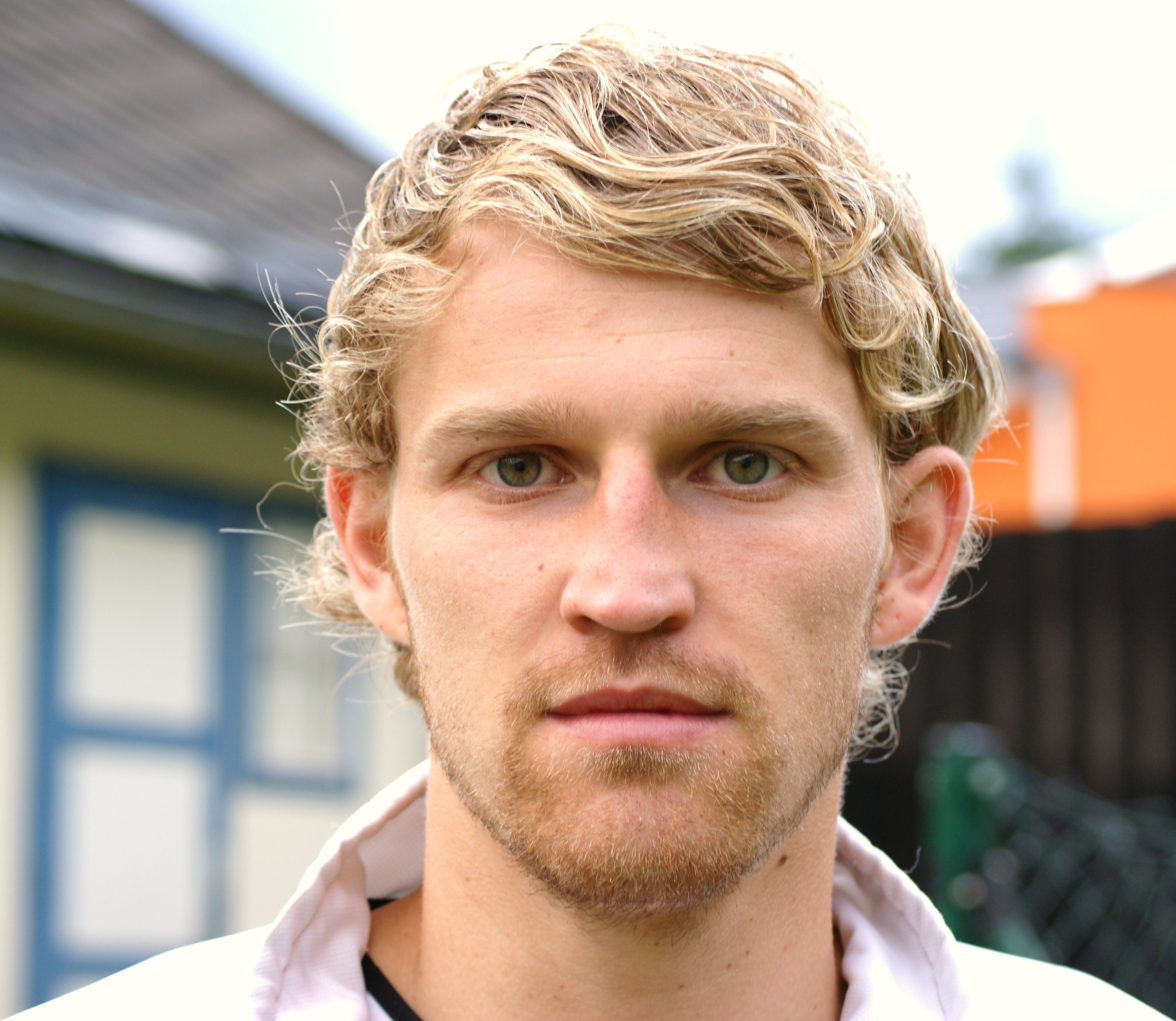

Personal information
- Full name: Markus Felfernig
- Date of birth: 18 June 1983 (age 43)
- Place of birth: Austria
- Height: 1.72 m (5 ft 7 1/2 in)
- Position: Midfielder

Team information
- Current team: Kapfenberg
- Number: 14

Senior career*
Years	Team	Apps	(Gls)
2001–2005	Austria Salzburg	5	(0)
2002–2003	→ Puch (loan)		
2005–2008	Red Bull Juniors	27	(3)
2008–	Kapfenberg	81	(5)
- * Club domestic league appearances and goals as of 29 November 2014

Markus Felfernig (born 18 June 1983) is an Austrian professional association football player currently playing for Austrian Football Bundesliga side Kapfenberger SV. He plays as a midfielder.
