= Robin Nelisse =

Aruban footballer (born 1978)

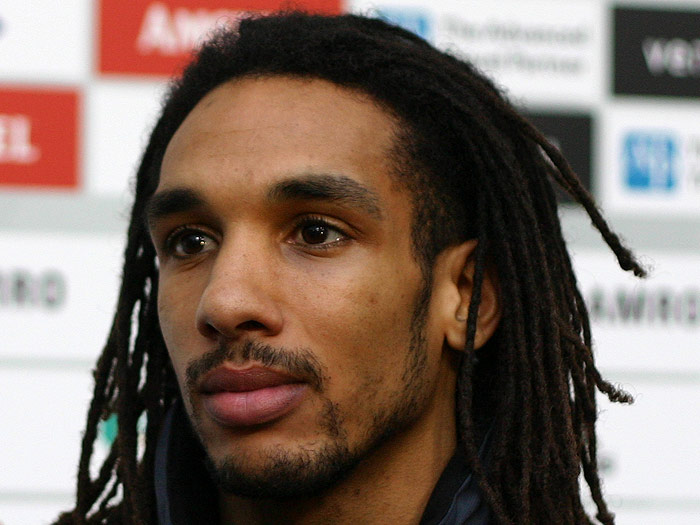
- Nelisse in 2006

Personal information
- Date of birth: 25 January 1978 (age 48)
- Place of birth: Rotterdam, Netherlands
- Height: 1.86 m (6 ft 1 in)
- Position: Striker

Youth career
- 1988–1990: De Musschen
- 1990–1997: Feyenoord

Senior career*
Years	Team	Apps	(Gls)
1997–2000	Feyenoord	14	(4)
1999–2000	→ Cambuur (loan)	34	(12)
2000–2005	AZ	154	(47)
2005–2008	Utrecht	83	(27)
2008–2011	Red Bull Salzburg	40	(13)
Total		325	(103)

International career
2008	Netherlands Antilles	2	(0)
- * Club domestic league appearances and goals

Robin Nelisse (born 25 January 1978) is an Aruban former professional footballer who played as a forward. He gained two caps for the former Netherlands Antillean national team.

== Career ==
Nelisse started playing football with De Musschen as a 10-year-old and was scouted by Feyenoord two years later, at the age of 12. In the 1997–98 season, he made nine appearances in which hed scored three goals. After he made a further five appearances in the following season and scoring one goal, Nelisse was sent on loan to Cambuur. There, he scored 12 goals in 34 matches. He subsequently moved to AZ, where he experienced his breakthrough under head coach Co Adriaanse. Nelisse spent five successful seasons at the club, in which he made 155 appearances for the club in which he scored 47 goals. After the arrival of Georgian striker Shota Arveladze, Nelisse was benched and therefore moved to FC Utrecht.

At Utrecht he was signed to succeed Michael Mols, who had left for ADO Den Haag. In the 2005–06 season he played 32 times for FC Utrecht and scored nine goals. In the 2006–07 season, he scored two goals in eighteen games due to injuries. In the summer of 2008, Nelisse left on a free transfer to Red Bull Salzburg, where he was reunited with Adriaanse. With the club, he won the Austrian Football Bundesliga twice; both in the 2008–09 and 2009–10 season. In August 2011, Nelisse announced his retirement from football due to a recurring knee injury.

Nelisse has since worked as a youth coach through Feyenoord Soccer Camp, and is an ambassador for the Dutch Caribbean Stars.

== Honours ==
Feyenoord

- Eredivisie: 1998–99

Red Bull Salzburg

- Austrian Football Bundesliga: 2008–09, 2009–10
