= Admir Vladavić =

Bosnian footballer (born 1982)

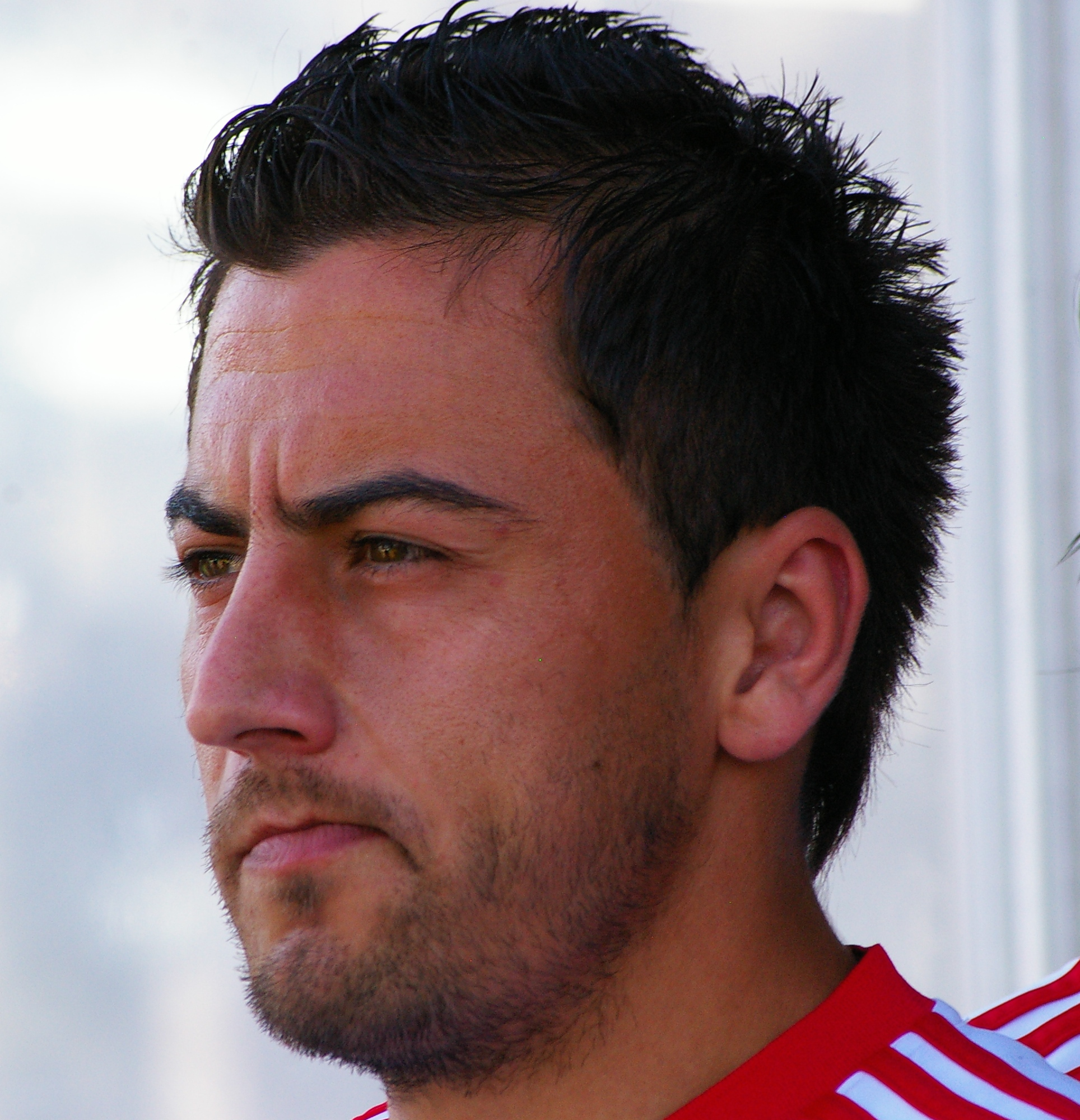
- Vladavić with Red Bull Salzburg in 2010

Personal information
- Full name: Admir Vladavić
- Date of birth: 29 June 1982 (age 44)
- Place of birth: Ljubinje, SFR Yugoslavia
- Height: 1.78 m (5 ft 10 in)
- Position: Winger

Team information
- Current team: Velež Mostar (assistant)

Youth career
- 1995–2000: Iskra Stolac

Senior career*
Years	Team	Apps	(Gls)
2000–2005	Velež Mostar	30	(1)
2005–2007	Željezničar	34	(8)
2007–2009	Žilina	66	(18)
2009–2010	Red Bull Salzburg	15	(1)
2010–2011	Žilina	10	(3)
2011	Olimpik	6	(2)
2012–2013	Karviná	38	(10)
2013–2014	→ Velež Mostar (loan)	15	(0)
2014	Sliema Wanderers	11	(3)
2014	Velež Mostar	8	(0)
Total		233	(46)

International career
2006–2009	Bosnia and Herzegovina	12	(0)

Managerial career
- 2025–: Velež Mostar (assistant)
- * Club domestic league appearances and goals

Admir Vladavić (born 29 June 1982) is a Bosnian football manager and former footballer who played as a winger. He is currently an assistant manager at Bosnian Premier League club Velež Mostar.

== Club career ==
Born in Ljubinje, Vladavić's career began in a small club Iskra Stolac, which consisted mainly of refugees from Stolac who lived in Mostar during the Bosnian War. He was spotted there by Velež Mostar and soon signed a contract. Although he was one of the youngest members of the club, Vladavić became a regular first team choice. His speed and good technical abilities made him interesting for other Bosnian clubs. Since Velež was playing in the second division at the time, and his ambitions were much bigger, Vladavić was determined to move. Sarajevo showed its interest, but they could not agree. In the summer of 2005, he moved to Željezničar.

Two years later, in February 2007, Vladavić signed a contract with Slovak Super Liga club Žilina, with whom he won the league title in May of that same year. In July 2009, Austrian champions Red Bull Salzburg signed Vladavić and managed to win the Austrian Bundesliga with them the next year. On 1 June 2011, he came back to Bosnia and Herzegovina and joined Olimpik from Sarajevo. On 18 January 2012, Vladavić signed with Czech club Karviná. In March 2013, he came back to Velež after eight years on a loan deal. On 1 January 2014, he joined Maltese Premier League club Sliema Wanderers. On 7 July 2014, Vladavić once again came back to Velež where he finished his career in December 2014 at the age of 32.

== International career ==
Good games secured Vladavić a call to the Bosnia and Herzegovina national team. He made his debut on 28 February 2006 in a game against Japan. In the next three years with the national team, Vladavić managed to make 11 more caps after the game against Japan, not scoring any goals. His final international was an October 2009 World Cup qualification match against Spain.

== Personal life ==
Vladavić and his wife, Ajla, have a son named Zinedin. His son is named after famous French player Zinedine Zidane

== Honours ==
=== Player ===
Žilina

- Slovak Super Liga: 2006–07

Red Bull Salzburg

- Austrian Bundesliga: 2009–10
