= Somen Tchoyi =

Cameroonian footballer (born 1983)

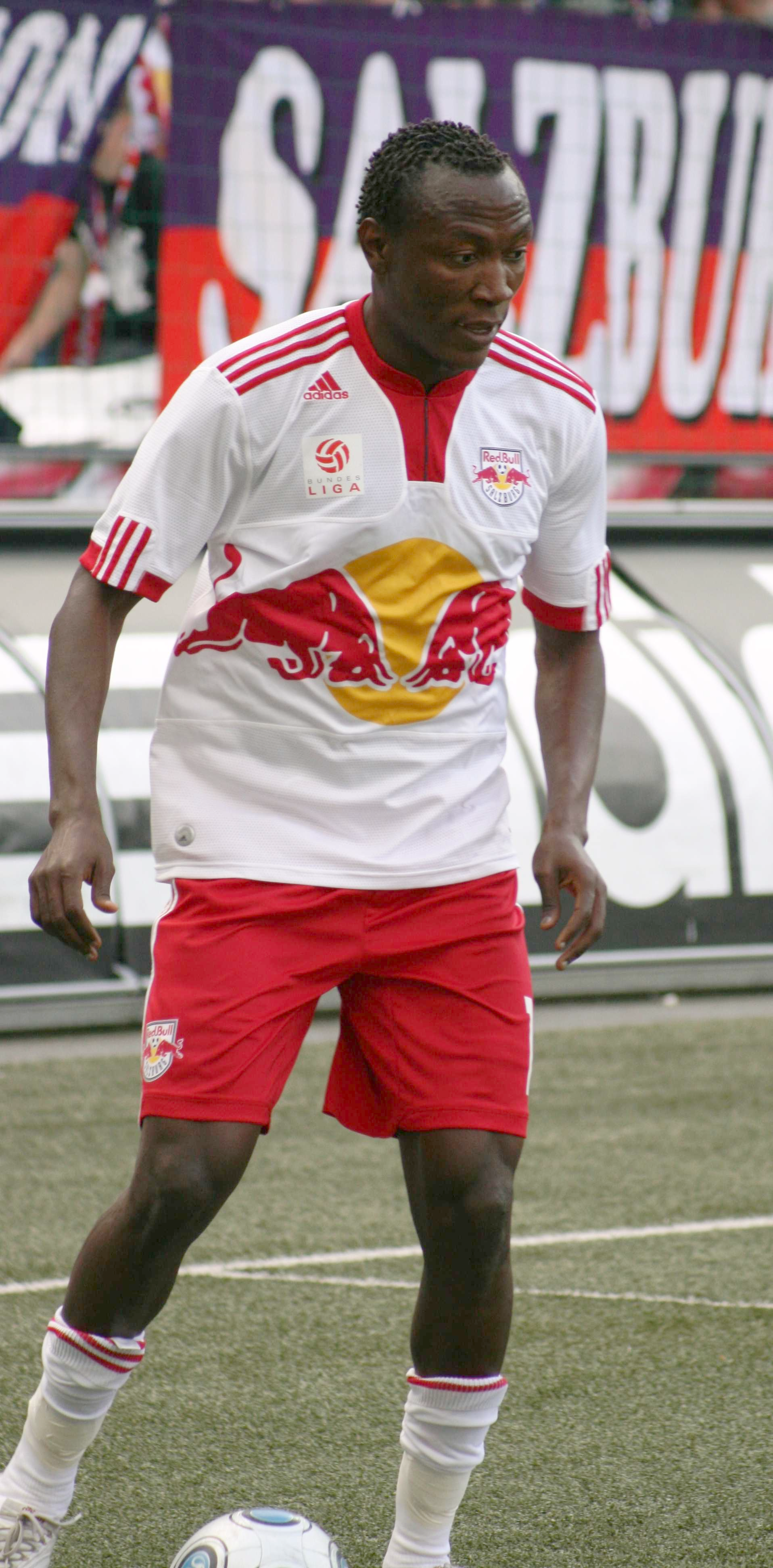
- Tchoyi in 2010

Personal information
- Full name: Somen Alfred Tchoyi
- Date of birth: 29 March 1983 (age 43)
- Place of birth: Douala, Cameroon
- Height: 1.90 m (6 ft 3 in)
- Position: Attacking midfielder

Senior career*
Years	Team	Apps	(Gls)
2004–2005	Union Douala	13	(2)
2005–2006	Odd Grenland	30	(1)
2006–2008	Stabæk	49	(8)
2008–2010	Red Bull Salzburg	68	(14)
2010–2012	West Bromwich Albion	41	(7)
2012–2014	FC Augsburg	2	(0)
2015	Austria Salzburg	15	(1)
Total		218	(33)

International career
2008–2011	Cameroon	15	(2)
- * Club domestic league appearances and goals

Somen Alfred Tchoyi (born 29 March 1983) is a Cameroonian former professional footballer who played as an attacking midfielder. He played for the Cameroon national team from to 2008 to 2011 scoring two goals in 15 appearances.

== Club career ==
=== Odd Grenland & Stabæk IF ===
Tchoyi signed for Odd Grenland in time for the 2005–2006 season from Union Douala. After Odd purchased Tommy Svindal Larsen, he played less due to the two not mixing well on the field and due to restrictions on non-EU players in Norway. Subsequently, Tchoyi was sold to Stabæk during the 2006–07 season for 3.000.000 NOK (approx. £330,000).

=== West Bromwich Albion ===
During the early summer of 2010, Tchoyi was reportedly the subject of interest from Premier League clubs, including Blackburn, Fulham and Wolverhampton Wanderers, but on 20 August 2010, after some lengthy preparation work, including a successful appeal for a UK work permit, newly promoted West Bromwich Albion acquired the player's services for two years on an undisclosed fee. He made his debut for the club when he came on as a substitute in a 1–0 defeat to Liverpool on 29 August 2010. He scored his first goal for the club against Manchester United at Old Trafford on 16 October 2010. He scored his second goal for the club in the 4–1 win over Leicester City in the English League Cup on 27 October 2010. He scored his third goal for West Bromwich Albion against Everton in a Premier League fixture on 27 November 2010, with a fourth the following weekend against Newcastle United. In a feat revered as 'Tchoyi Story 3' by Baggies fans (referencing the film Toy Story 3) he scored a hat-trick against Newcastle United at St. James' Park on the last day of the 2010–11 season, rescuing a point for the Baggies after being down 3–0 early into the second half.

He picked up his form by starting West Brom's first game of the 2011–12 campaign at home to Manchester United, linking up well with the club's new record signing Shane Long. Despite a battling performance to level the score at 1–1, United won the game 2–1. Tchoyi scored his last goal for the club away to Fulham to level the score at 1–1 late on in the game. He was an enigmatic but liked player at the Hawthorns, earning the nickname 'big unit'.

=== FC Augsburg ===
Following 41 games at West Brom netting 7 goals, Tchoyi was released. He subsequently signed a contract with Augsburg in Germany until the end of the season with an option for an extension.
