= Barry Opdam =

Dutch footballer

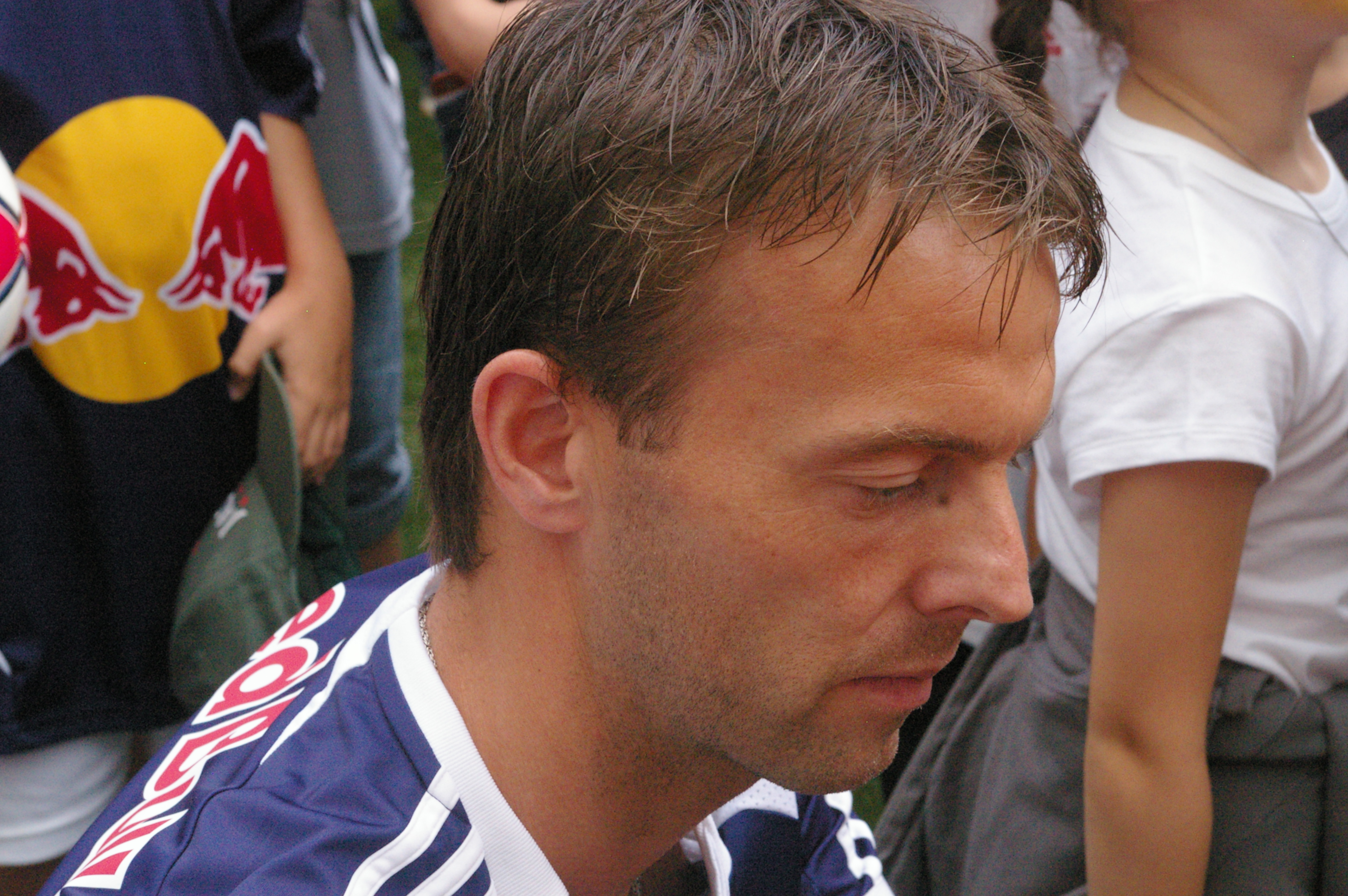
- Opdam as a Red Bull player in 2009

Personal information
- Full name: Barry Opdam
- Date of birth: 27 February 1976 (age 50)
- Place of birth: Leiden, Netherlands
- Height: 1.86 m (6 ft 1 in)
- Position: Centre back

Youth career
- Lisse

Senior career*
Years	Team	Apps	(Gls)
1996–2008	AZ	331	(13)
2008–2010	Red Bull Salzburg	48	(1)
2010–2012	Volendam	16	(0)
Total		395	(14)

International career
2005–2006	Netherlands	8	(1)
- * Club domestic league appearances and goals

Barry Opdam (born 27 February 1976) is a Dutch retired footballer who played as a central defender.

He spent most of his 16-year professional career with AZ, amassing Eredivisie totals of 316 games and 13 goals over the course of 11 seasons, all with that club.

== Club career ==
Born in Leiden, South Holland, Opdam began his professional career with AZ Alkmaar, being relegated to the second division in his first year and immediately promoting back in the following. Subsequently, he became an undisputed starter for the North Holland side, amassing more than 400 official appearances.

Not known as a goal scorer, Opdam scored an essential one in the second leg of the 2006–07 UEFA Cup round-of-32 clash against Fenerbahçe SK. After a 3–3 draw in Istanbul, the Turkish led 2–0 at half-time, and the defender headed home from a Julian Jenner free kick with seven minutes to go, making it 2–2 and sending his team to the next round on away goals rule (eventually reaching the last-eight stage); in the 2004–05 edition AZ reached the semifinals of the competition, the second time in 24 years.

In 2008, one year after finishing second in the Dutch Cup, 32-year-old Opdam had his first abroad experience, signing for Austrian club FC Red Bull Salzburg. After two seasons, being an important defensive unit in the conquest of back-to-back national championships, he returned to his country, joining FC Volendam in the second level.

== International career ==
On 4 June 2005, Opdam made his debut for the Netherlands in a 2–0 win against Romania for the 2006 FIFA World Cup qualifiers. On 8 October, in the same competition, he scored his first and only international goal, in a 2–0 win against the Czech Republic.

Opdam would be, however, overlooked by national team coach Marco van Basten for the final stages in Germany, gaining a total of eight caps.

Barry Opdam: International goals
#	Date	Venue	Opponent	Score	Result	Competition
1.	8 October 2005	Toyota Arena, Prague, Czech Republic	Czech Republic	0–2	0–2	2006 World Cup qualification

== Club statistics ==
Season	Club	Apps	Goals	Competition
1996/97	AZ	24	0	Eredivisie
1997/98	AZ	15	0	Eerste Divisie
1998/99	AZ	22	0	Eredivisie
1999/00	AZ	34	5	Eredivisie
2000/01	AZ	32	2	Eredivisie
2001/02	AZ	31	1	Eredivisie
2002/03	AZ	32	0	Eredivisie
2003/04	AZ	28	1	Eredivisie
2004/05	AZ	33	2	Eredivisie
2005/06	AZ	24	0	Eredivisie
2006/07	AZ	24	1	Eredivisie
2007/08	AZ	32	1	Eredivisie
2008/09	Red Bull	25	0	Austrian Bundesliga
2009/10	Red Bull	23	1	Austrian Bundesliga
2010/11	Volendam	14	0	Eerste Divisie
2011/12	Volendam	2	0	Eerste Divisie
Total		395	14	

== Honours ==
AZ

- Second Division: 1997–98
- Dutch Cup: Runner-up 2006–07

Red Bull

- Austrian League: 2008–09, 2009–10
