= Stefan Bliem =

Austrian footballer

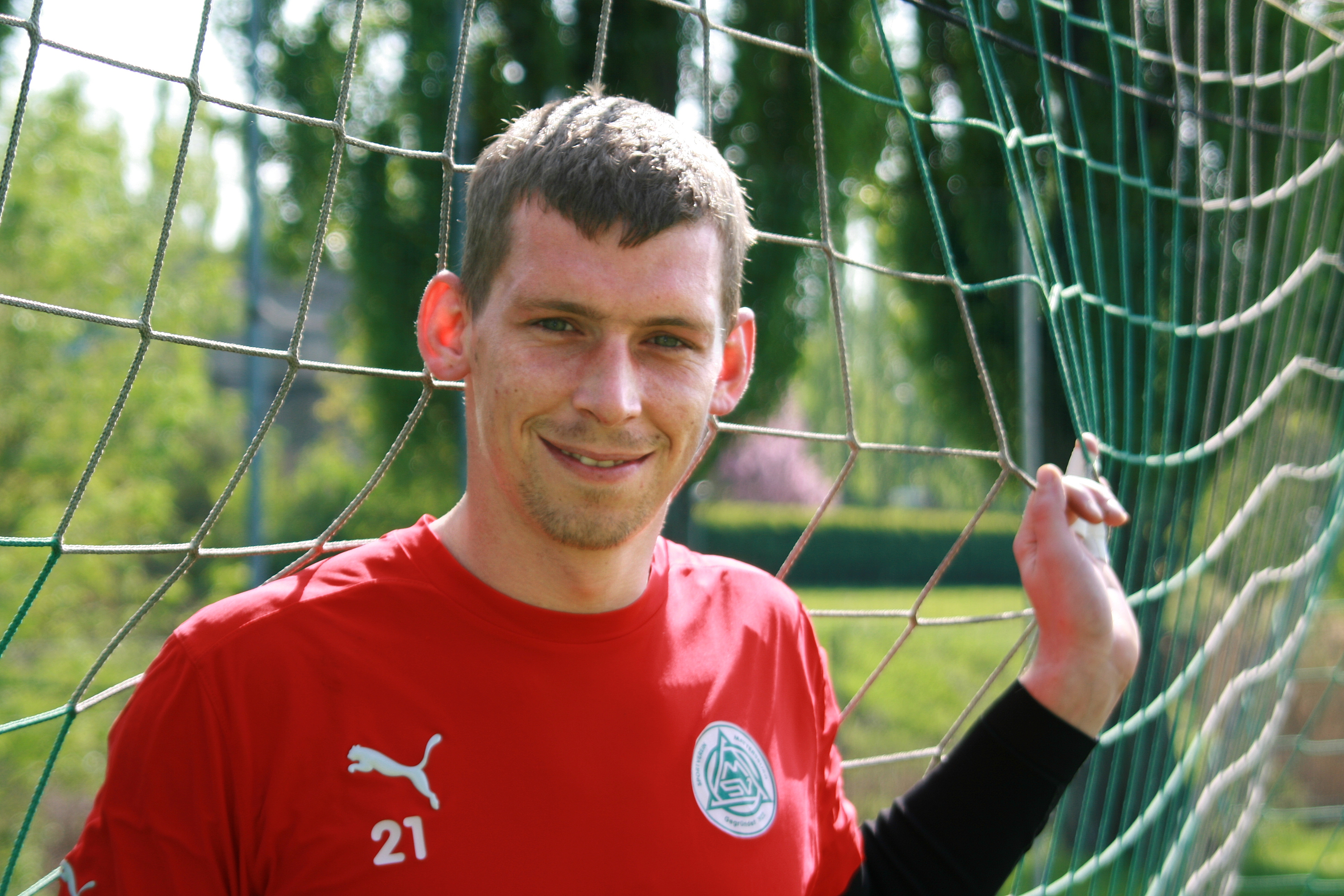

Personal information
- Full name: Stefan Bliem
- Date of birth: 5 May 1983 (age 43)
- Place of birth: Gloggnitz
- Height: 1.92 m (6 ft 3 1/2 in)
- Position: Goalkeeper

Team information
- Current team: SV Gloggnitz

Senior career*
Years	Team	Apps	(Gls)
2001-2003	Wr Neustadt SV Admira		
2003-2007	SV Sigless		
2007-2013	Mattersburg		
2014	SV Schottwien		
- * Club domestic league appearances and goals as of 13 May 2011

Stefan Bliem (born 5 May 1983) is an Austrian professional association football player. He plays as a goalkeeper, and played between 2007 and 2013 for Mattersburg in the Austrian Bundesliga.
