= Patrick Osoinik =

Austrian footballer

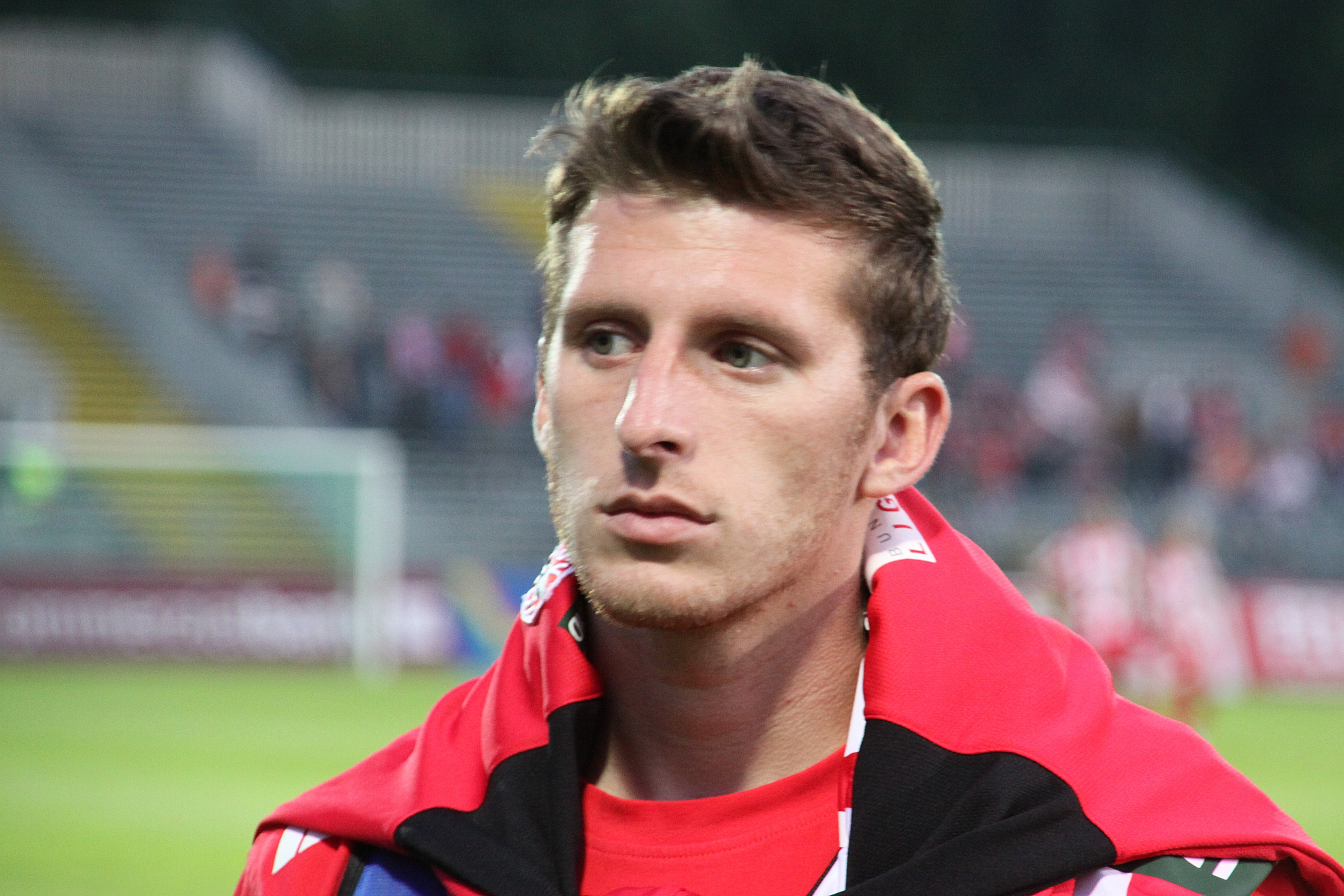

Personal information
- Date of birth: 29 January 1985 (age 41)
- Place of birth: Vienna, Austria
- Height: 1.77 m (5 ft 9 1/2 in)
- Position: Defender

Team information
- Current team: SV Horn
- Number: 5

Senior career*
Years	Team	Apps	(Gls)
2003–2006	Admira Wacker	46	(0)
2006–2010	Kapfenberg	91	(1)
2010–2011	First Vienna	8	(0)
2011–	SV Horn		

International career
	Austria U-21	11	(0)
- * Club domestic league appearances and goals as of 17 April 2010

Patrick Osoinik (born 29 January 1985) is an Austrian professional association football player currently playing for SV Horn. He plays as a defender and won eleven caps for the Austria national under-21 football team.
