= Wolfgang Schober =

Austrian footballer

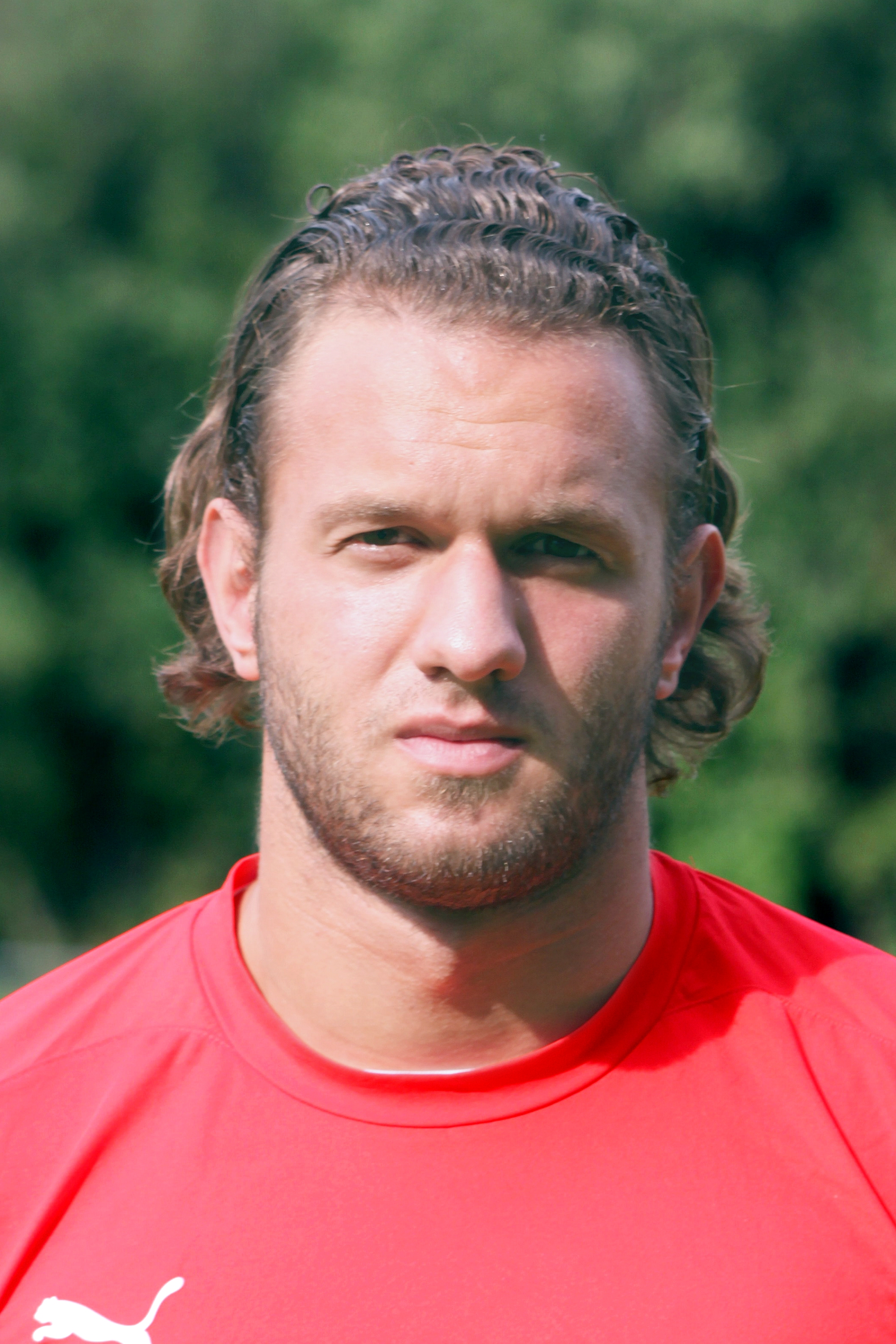

Personal information
- Date of birth: 6 July 1989 (age 37)
- Place of birth: München, Germany
- Height: 1.87 m (6 ft 1 1/2 in)
- Position: Goalkeeper

Team information
- Current team: Wacker Innsbruck
- Number: 44

Senior career*
Years	Team	Apps	(Gls)
2006–2008	Red Bull Salzburg Juniors	44	(0)
2008–2011	Red Bull Salzburg	0	(0)
2010	→ TSV Hartberg (loan)	16	(0)
2011–2013	SV Ried	2	(0)
2013–	Wacker Innsbruck	9	(0)

International career^{‡}
2008–2009	Austria U-20	5	(0)
- * Club domestic league appearances and goals as of 18 December 2013 ‡ National team caps and goals as of 3 December 2010

Wolfgang Schober (born 6 July 1989) is an Austrian football goalkeeper currently playing for FC Wacker Innsbruck.
