= Ronald Spuller =

Austrian footballer

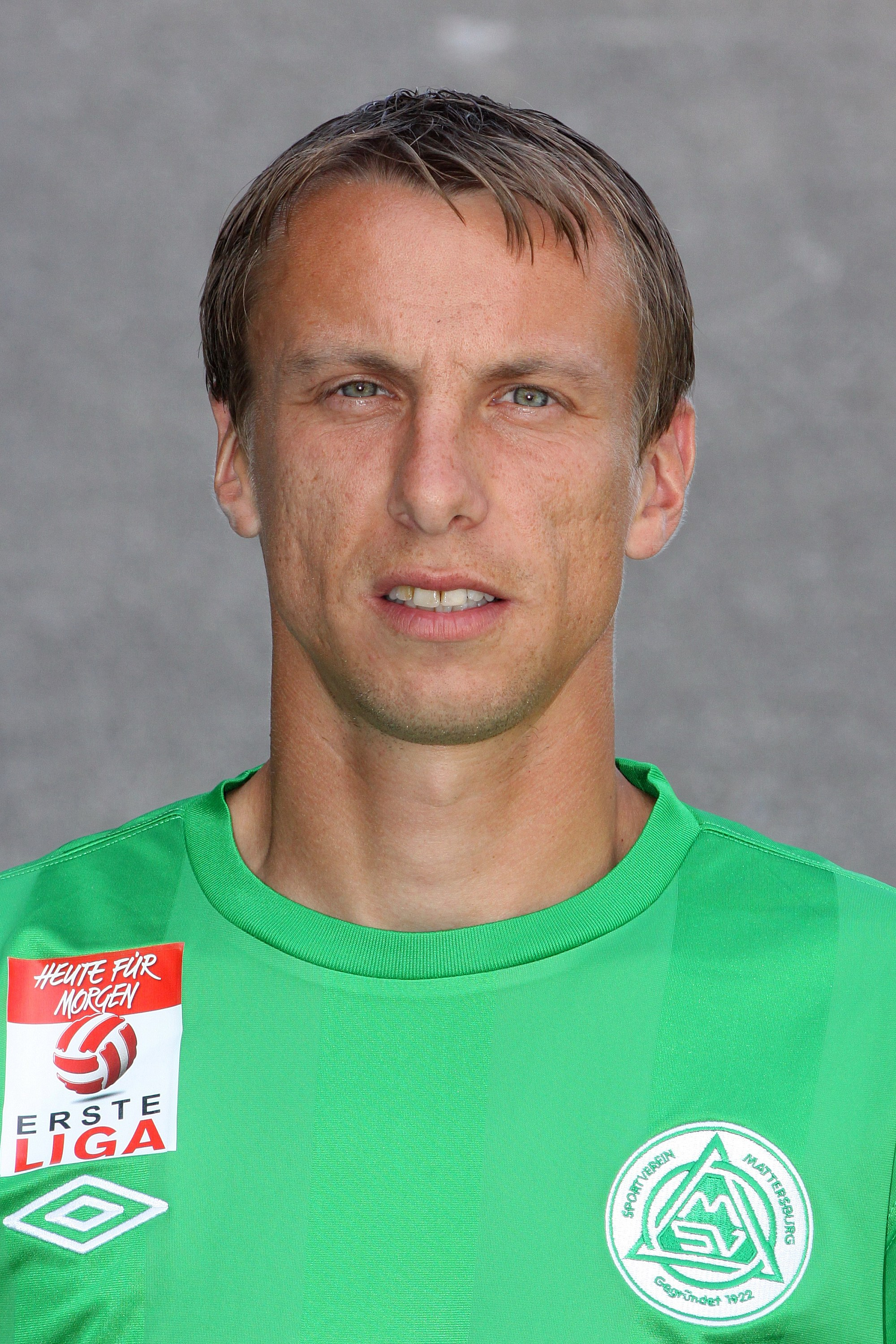

Personal information
- Full name: Ronald Spuller
- Date of birth: 22 June 1981 (age 45)
- Place of birth: Austria
- Height: 1.79 m (5 ft 10 1/2 in)
- Position: Striker

Senior career*
Years	Team	Apps	(Gls)
2002–2004	Neudörfl	?	(?)
2004–2008	Forchtenstein	?	(?)
2008–2014	Mattersburg	94	(10)
- * Club domestic league appearances and goals as of 22 November 2013

Ronald Spuller (born 22 June 1981) is an Austrian professional association football player. He played as an attacking midfielder before retiring in 2014. He currently works as physical therapist in Austria.
