= Simon Cziommer =

German footballer

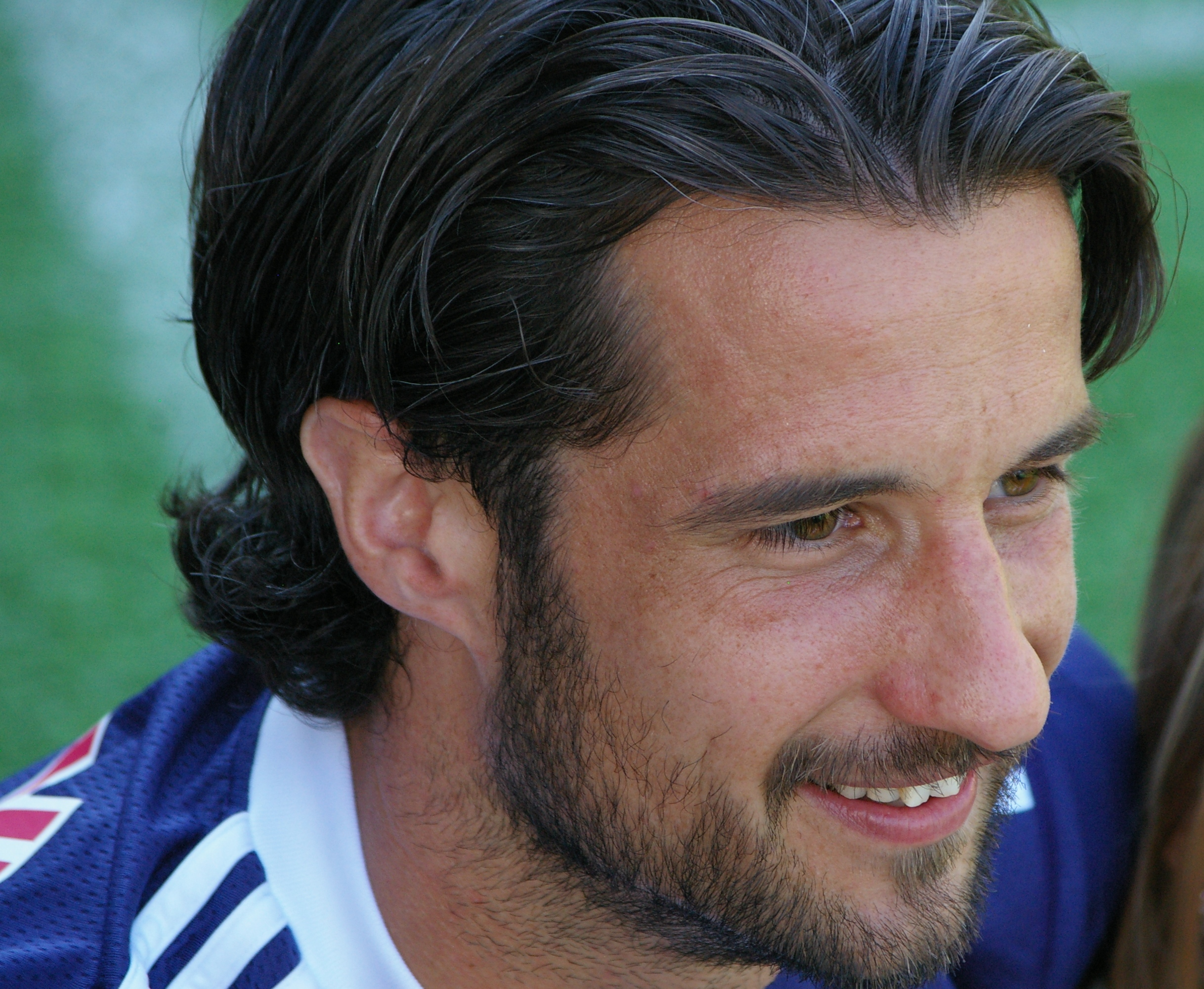
- Cziommer with Salzburg in 2010.

Personal information
- Date of birth: 6 November 1980 (age 45)
- Place of birth: Nordhorn, West Germany
- Height: 1.78 m (5 ft 10 in)
- Position: Midfielder

Youth career
- FC Schüttorf 09
- 1994–1999: Twente

Senior career*
Years	Team	Apps	(Gls)
2000–2003	Twente	55	(9)
2003–2006	Schalke 04	2	(0)
2004–2005	→ Twente (loan)	26	(4)
2006	→ Roda JC (loan)	15	(8)
2006–2009	AZ	38	(8)
2008–2009	→ Utrecht (loan)	24	(2)
2009–2012	Red Bull Salzburg	70	(11)
2012–2013	Vitesse	21	(1)
2013–2015	Heracles Almelo	51	(2)
Total		302	(45)

International career
	Germany U-17	12	(1)
- * Club domestic league appearances and goals

Simon Cziommer (German pronunciation: [ˈzɪmɔn ˈtʃi̯ɔmɐ]; born 6 November 1980) is a German former professional footballer who played as a midfielder.

== Career ==
Since he joined FC Twente in 1999 he scored 28 goals for various clubs. He played in UEFA Cup and UEFA Champions League games, the latter with his former club FC Schalke 04. A goalscoring attacking midfielder, Cziommer is known as a good dribbler.

He was signed by AZ Alkmaar from Schalke 04 just before the start of the 2006–07 season. In the 2008–09 season, he played on loan with FC Utrecht from AZ and signed on 22 June 2009 to FC Red Bull Salzburg where he played until 2012.

On 31 July 2012, Cziommer signed a one-year contract with Vitesse Arnhem from the Eredivisie. After he had been released by Vitesse Arnhem, he trained for a while with his former team AZ. On 2 September 2013, he was signed by Heracles Almelo to be the successor of Lerin Duarte, who had been sold to Ajax.

On 31 August 2015, Cziommer reportedly signed a contract with amateur outfit LSVV '70, a student association based in Leiden. Although the news was published and shared by several national media, and retweeted by several Dutch football clubs, the students soon released a statement, confessing Cziommer's move had been a joke.

== Post-playing career ==
On 14 October 2015, Cziommer announced he had definitely retired from professional football, after not being able to find a club of his approval.

Cziommer speaks Dutch fluently and lives in Laren, North Holland. After his football career, he became a player's agent at Stars & Friends.

== Honours ==
Schalke 04

- UEFA Intertoto Cup: 2003

Red Bull Salzburg

- Austrian Football Bundesliga: 2009–10, 2011–12
- Austrian Cup: 2011–12
