= Christian Haselberger =

Austrian footballer

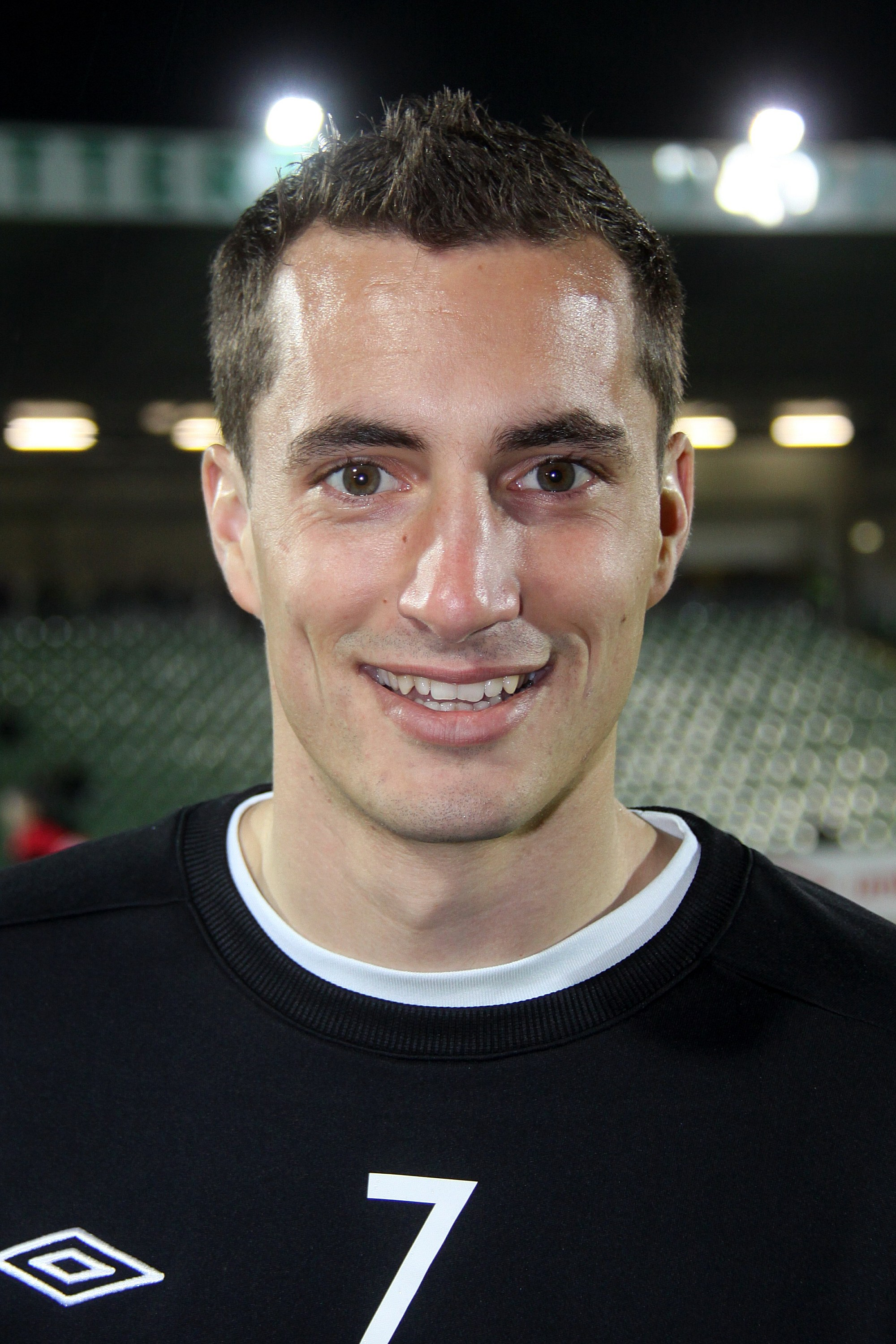

Personal information
- Date of birth: 2 June 1989 (age 37)
- Place of birth: Melk, Austria
- Height: 1.85 m (6 ft 1 in)
- Position: Centre-back

Team information
- Current team: LASK (youth coach)

Youth career
- 1995–2001: ASK Ybbs
- 2001–2003: SKU Amstetten
- 2003–2009: Austria Wien

Senior career*
Years	Team	Apps	(Gls)
2007–2009	Austria Wien	1	(0)
2009–2012	Wiener Neustadt	14	(0)
2011–2014	FC Lustenau	47	(3)
2014	Kapfenberger SV	11	(1)
2014–2016	FAC	48	(3)
2017–2018	SC Mannsdorf	42	(11)
2018–2019	FC Mauerwerk	12	(1)
2019–2020	SV Horn	12	(1)
2021–2022	SC Pinkafeld	12	(2)

International career
2006–2008	Austria U-20	1	(0)

Managerial career
- 2020–2022: SC Pinkafeld (assistant)
- 2022–: LASK (youth coach)
- * Club domestic league appearances and goals

Christian Haselberger (born 2 June 1989) is an Austrian football coach and a former player. He is currently working as an academy coach at LASK.

== Career ==
In the summer 2020, Haselberger was appointed assistant coach of Austrian fourth-tier club SC Pinkafeld. In September 2021, he made his comeback on the pitch, appearing in 12 games for the team, while still maintaining his position as assistant coach.

In June 2022, he became a youth coach at LASK.
