= Matthias Hattenberger =

Austrian footballer

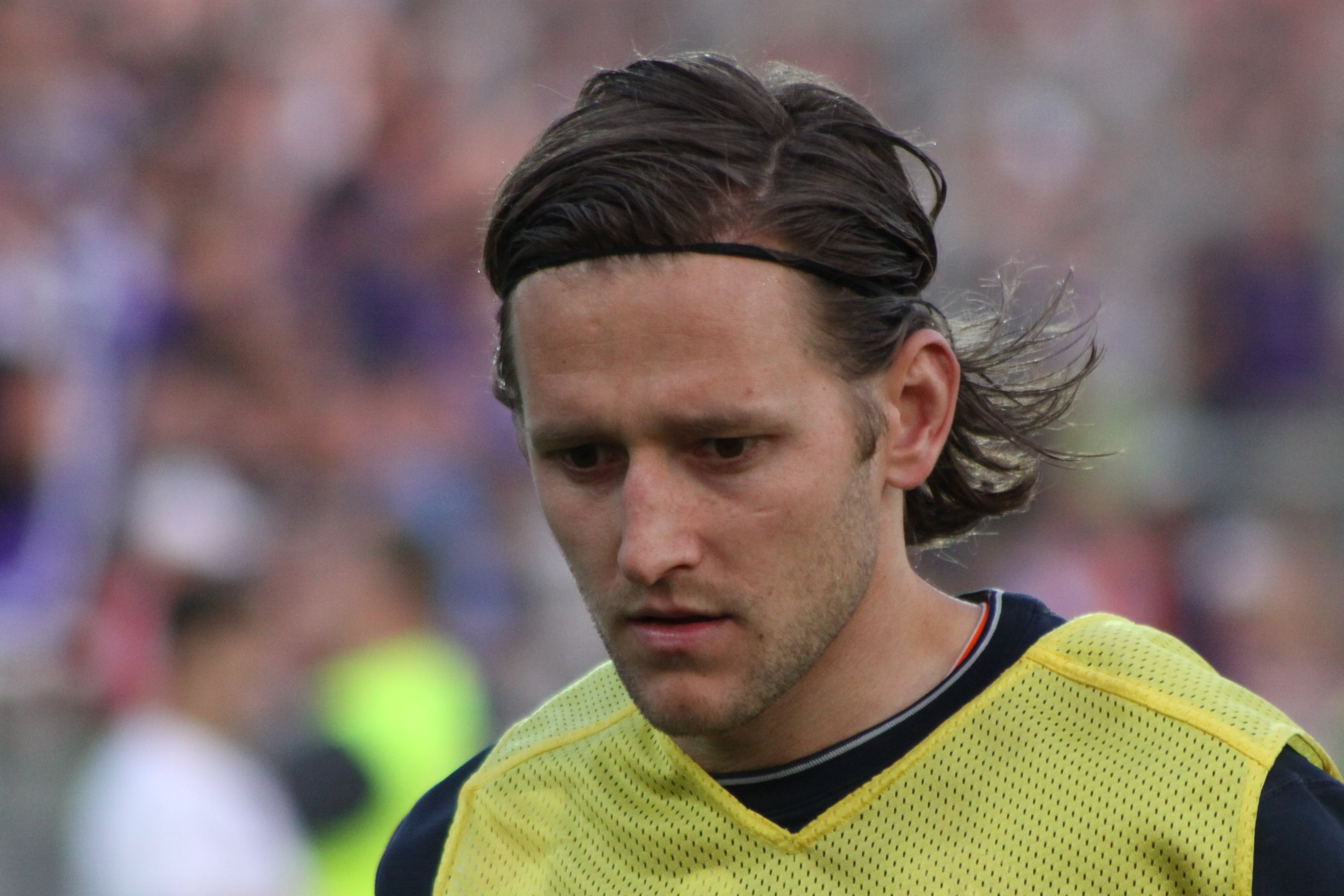

Personal information
- Date of birth: 30 November 1978 (age 47)
- Place of birth: Kufstein, Austria
- Height: 1.85 m (6 ft 1 in)
- Position: Midfielder

Senior career*
Years	Team	Apps	(Gls)
1996–1999	Kufstein	?	(?)
1999–2002	Tirol Innsbruck	?	(?)
2002–2003	Wacker Innsbruck	?	(?)
2003–2005	Wörgl	46	(3)
2004	→ Kärnten (loan)	1	(0)
2005–2008	Wacker Innsbruck	67	(9)
2008–2010	Austria Wien	39	(3)
2010–2011	SV Grödig	19	(2)
2011–2012	First Vienna	29	(3)
- * Club domestic league appearances and goals as of 8 June 2012

Matthias Hattenberger (born 30 November 1978) is an Austrian professional association football player. He plays as a midfielder. His father, Roland Hattenberger, was also a footballer and played 51 matches for Austria.
