= 2008–09 SC Rheindorf Altach season =

SC Rheindorf Altach
2008–09 season
- Chairman: Werner Gunz
- Manager: Heinz Fuchsbichler (until 30 August); Urs Schönenberger (until 12 January); Georg Zellhofer (from 12 January)
- Austrian Football Bundesliga: 10th (relegated)
- Austrian Cup: Second round
- Top goalscorer: League: Tomáš Jun (8); All: Tomáš Jun (8)
Home colours	Away colours	Third colours

The 2008–09 season was SC Rheindorf Altach's 80th season in existence and the club's 3rd consecutive season in the top flight of Austrian football. In addition to the domestic league, Altach participated in this season's edition of the Austrian Cup.

== First-team squad ==
Squad at end of season

Note: Flags indicate national team as defined under FIFA eligibility rules; some limited exceptions apply. Players may hold more than one non-FIFA nationality.

No.	Pos.	Nation	Player
2	DF	(Austria) AUT	Christoph Stückler
3	DF	(Austria) AUT	Andreas Simma
4	DF	(Austria) AUT	Enrico Pfister
5	DF	(Austria) AUT	Dennis Mimm
6	MF	(Czech Republic) CZE	Petr Voříšek
7	MF	(Austria) AUT	Markus Kiesenebner
8	DF	(The Gambia) GAM	Pa Ousman Sonko
9	FW	(Austria) AUT	Patrick Mayer
10	FW	(Montenegro) MNE	Srđan Radonjić (on loan from OB)
11	FW	(Czech Republic) CZE	Tomáš Jun
12	DF	(Uruguay) URU	Fernando Carreño
13	DF	(Germany) GER	Stephan Kling
14	DF	(Austria) AUT	Patrick Pircher
15	DF	(Nigeria) NGA	Olubayo Adefemi
16	FW	(Austria) AUT	Mario Konrad
17	DF	(Austria) AUT	Alexander Guem

No.	Pos.	Nation	Player
18	FW	(Austria) AUT	Oliver Mattle
19	MF	(Austria) AUT	Dursun Karatay
20	MF	(Brazil) BRA	Zé Elias
21	GK	(Austria) AUT	Markus Breuß
22	MF	(Austria) AUT	Butrint Vishaj
23	MF	(Austria) AUT	Kai Schoppitsch
24	GK	(Austria) AUT	Andreas Michl
25	DF	(Austria) AUT	Daniel Gramann
26	MF	(Austria) AUT	Matthias Koch
27	FW	(Switzerland) SUI	Orhan Ademi
28	MF	(Austria) AUT	Manfred Pamminger
29	MF	(Austria) AUT	Mathias Bachstein
30	MF	(Bosnia and Herzegovina) BIH	Mehmed Malkoč
31	FW	(Austria) AUT	Horst Freiberger
32	DF	(Serbia) SRB	Slavoljub Đorđević
80	GK	(Austria) AUT	Josef Schicklgruber

=== Left club during season ===
Note: Flags indicate national team as defined under FIFA eligibility rules; some limited exceptions apply. Players may hold more than one non-FIFA nationality.

No.	Pos.	Nation	Player
1	GK	(Austria) AUT	Mario Krassnitzer (to Austria Lustenau)
6	DF	(Switzerland) SUI	Daniel Sereinig (to Freiburg)
7	DF	(Germany) GER	Karsten Hutwelker (to TSC Euskirchen)
8	MF	(Brazil) BRA	Reinaldo Ribeiro (to Vöcklabruck)
10	FW	(Brazil) BRA	Aílton (to Campinense)

No.	Pos.	Nation	Player
11	FW	(The Gambia) GAM	Modou Jagne (released)
14	FW	(Brazil) BRA	Leonardo (to HamKam)
15	DF	(Croatia) CRO	Mihael Rajić (to Vöcklabruck)
27	DF	(Austria) AUT	Dario Baldauf (to Lustenau)

== Competitions ==
=== Bundesliga ===
==== League table ====
Pos	Team	Pld	W	D	L	GF	GA	GD	Pts	Qualification or relegation
6	Austria Kärnten	36	11	8	17	47	57	−10	41	
7	LASK Linz	36	11	4	21	35	67	−32	37	
8	Kapfenberger SV	36	10	6	20	48	81	−33	36	
9	Mattersburg	36	8	9	19	42	71	−29	33	
10	Rheindorf Altach (R)	36	8	6	22	56	90	−34	30	Relegation to Austrian First Football League

Source: weltfussball.de (in German)
Rules for classification: 1) points; 2) goal difference; 3) number of goals scored.
(R) Relegated
