= 2008–09 Austrian Football Bundesliga =

97th season of top-tier football league in Austria

Austrian Football Bundesliga
- Season: 2008–09
- Dates: 8 July 2008 – 31 May 2009
- Champions: Red Bull Salzburg; 5th Austrian title
- Relegated: SCR Altach
- Champions League: Red Bull Salzburg
- Europa League: Rapid Vienna; Sturm Graz; Austria Vienna (via domestic cup)
- Matches: 180
- Goals: 588 (3.27 per match)
- Top goalscorer: (Austria) Marc Janko (39)
- Biggest home win: Rapid 8–1 Altach
- Biggest away win: Altach 2–7 Rapid
- Highest scoring: Mattersburg 5–6 Sturm

The Austrian Football Bundesliga 2008–09 was the 97th season of top-tier football in Austria. The competition is officially called tipp3-Bundesliga powered by T-Mobile, named after the Austrian betting company tipp3 and the Austrian branch of German mobile phone company T-Mobile. The season started on 8 July 2008 with Sturm Graz beating defending champions Rapid Vienna by 3–1. The 36th and last round of matches took place on 31 May 2009.

== Team changes from last season ==
Fußballclub Wacker Innsbruck were relegated after finishing the 2007–08 season in 10th and last place. They were replaced by First League champions Kapfenberger SV.

== Overview ==
=== Stadia and locations ===
Location of teams in the Austrian Football Bundesliga 2008–09

Team	City/Area	Venue	Capacity
SCR Altach	Altach	Stadion Schnabelholz	8,500
Austria Kärnten	Klagenfurt	Hypo-Arena	32,000
Austria Vienna	Vienna	Franz Horr Stadium	13,000
Kapfenberger SV	Kapfenberg	Franz Fekete Stadium	12,000
LASK	Linz	Linzer Stadion	14,100
SV Mattersburg	Mattersburg	Pappelstadion	15,700
Rapid Vienna	Vienna	Gerhard Hanappi Stadium	18,442
Red Bull Salzburg	Salzburg	Red Bull Arena	31,895 / 30,188
SV Ried	Ried im Innkreis	Fill Metallbau Stadion	7,700
Sturm Graz	Graz	UPC-Arena	15,312

=== Personnel ===
Team	Manager	Team captain
SCR Altach	(Austria) Georg Zellhofer	(Austria) Kai Schoppitsch
Austria Kärnten	(Austria) Frank Schinkels	(Austria) Manuel Weber
Austria Vienna	(Austria) Karl Daxbacher	(France) Jocelyn Blanchard
Kapfenberger SV	(Austria) Werner Gregoritsch	(Austria) Dominique Taboga
LASK	(Austria) Hans Krankl	(Austria) Ivica Vastić
SV Mattersburg	(Austria) Franz Lederer	(Germany) Carsten Jancker
Rapid Vienna	(Austria) Peter Pacult	(Germany) Steffen Hofmann
Red Bull Salzburg	(Netherlands) Co Adriaanse	(Germany) Alexander Zickler
SV Ried	(Austria) Paul Gludovatz	(Austria) Herwig Drechsel
Sturm Graz	(Germany) Franco Foda	(Austria) Mario Haas

=== Managerial changes ===
Team	Outgoing manager	Manner of departure	Date of vacancy	Replaced by	Date of appointment
SCR Altach	(Austria) Heinz Fuchsbichler	Sacked	30 August 2008	(Switzerland) Urs Schönenberger	4 September 2008
LASK Linz	(Croatia) Andrej Panadić	Sacked	27 October 2008	(Austria) Klaus Lindenberger	27 October 2008
SCR Altach	(Switzerland) Urs Schönenberger	Sacked	12 January 2009	(Austria) Georg Zellhofer	12 January 2009
LASK Linz	(Austria) Klaus Lindenberger	Resigned	21 March 2009	(Austria) Hans Krankl	24 March 2009

== League table ==
Pos	Team	Pld	W	D	L	GF	GA	GD	Pts	Qualification or relegation
1	Red Bull Salzburg (C)	36	23	5	8	86	50	+36	74	Qualification to Champions League second qualifying round
2	Rapid Wien	36	21	7	8	89	43	+46	70	Qualification to Europa League second qualifying round
3	Austria Wien	36	17	11	8	59	46	+13	62	Qualification to Europa League third qualifying round (Note: Austria Vienna won the 2008–09 Austrian Cup and therefore qualified for the third qualifying round of the UEFA Europa League.)
4	Sturm Graz	36	17	9	10	68	45	+23	60	Qualification to Europa League second qualifying round
5	Ried	36	17	9	10	58	38	+20	60	
6	Austria Kärnten	36	11	8	17	47	57	−10	41	
7	LASK Linz	36	11	4	21	35	67	−32	37	
8	Kapfenberger SV	36	10	6	20	48	81	−33	36	
9	Mattersburg	36	8	9	19	42	71	−29	33	
10	Rheindorf Altach (R)	36	8	6	22	56	90	−34	30	Relegation to Austrian First Football League

Source: weltfussball.de (in German)
Rules for classification: 1) points; 2) goal difference; 3) number of goals scored.
(C) Champions; (R) Relegated

== Results ==
Teams played each other four times in the league. In the first half of the season each team played every other team twice (home and away), and then did the same in the second half of the season.

=== First half of season ===
Home \ Away	AKÄ	ALT	AWI	KAP	LIN	MAT	RWI	RIE	RBS	STU
Austria Kärnten		2–1	0–1	6–0	1–0	2–0	3–3	1–1	1–0	0–2
Rheindorf Altach	0–3		0–1	3–0	1–3	2–2	2–7	0–1	3–4	1–0
Austria Wien	1–1	2–1		0–0	5–0	2–1	2–0	3–1	3–2	1–3
Kapfenberger SV	0–2	3–2	2–2		0–1	2–1	0–2	2–0	1–1	1–3
LASK Linz	3–2	1–3	0–1	2–0		2–1	2–5	2–1	0–2	0–3
Mattersburg	0–0	3–1	0–0	2–1	1–4		0–1	2–1	1–2	5–6
Rapid Wien	1–0	5–1	3–0	3–1	5–0	1–0		1–1	2–2	2–1
Ried	0–0	3–0	3–1	2–1	3–0	0–0	1–0		2–2	4–1
Red Bull Salzburg	4–1	3–0	5–1	7–3	1–0	6–0	1–0	2–1		3–1
Sturm Graz	3–0	6–0	0–0	2–0	2–0	3–0	3–1	3–0	2–2	

Source: weltfussball.de (in German)
Legend: Blue = home team win; Yellow = draw; Red = away team win.

=== Second half of season ===
Home \ Away	AKÄ	ALT	AWI	KAP	LIN	MAT	RWI	RIE	RBS	STU
Austria Kärnten		0–3	1–1	0–2	0–1	0–0	1–3	1–2	2–0	4–2
Rheindorf Altach	2–5		2–1	5–1	1–1	4–1	1–1	1–1	1–2	1–1
Austria Wien	4–1	4–1		2–1	4–0	0–0	2–2	3–1	1–1	2–0
Kapfenberger SV	2–1	1–1	1–2		4–1	3–1	0–4	2–1	0–2	3–3
LASK Linz	0–2	2–0	4–0	2–2		0–0	0–2	0–3	0–3	1–0
Mattersburg	3–2	5–4	0–2	3–1	3–1		0–3	2–2	2–4	0–0
Rapid Wien	4–2	8–1	3–2	6–0	1–1	2–3		1–0	4–2	0–1
Ried	2–0	3–2	0–0	3–0	1–0	4–0	3–0		3–0	3–2
Red Bull Salzburg	6–0	1–4	4–1	2–5	2–1	2–0	2–1	2–0		2–1
Sturm Graz	0–0	3–1	2–2	1–3	2–0	1–0	2–2	1–1	2–0	

Source: weltfussball.de (in German)
Legend: Blue = home team win; Yellow = draw; Red = away team win.

== Top goalscorers ==
Source: bundesliga.at (in German)

Rank	Scorer	Club	Goals
1	(Austria) Marc Janko	Red Bull Salzburg	39
2	(Austria) Erwin Hoffer	Rapid Vienna	27
3	(Austria) Stefan Maierhofer	Rapid Vienna	23
4	(Austria) Mario Haas	Sturm Graz	15
5	(Slovenia) Milenko Ačimovič	Austria Vienna	14
5	(Spain) Nacho	SV Ried	14
5	(Austria) Rubin Okotie	Austria Vienna	14
5	(Albania) Hamdi Salihi	SV Ried	14
9	(Germany) Steffen Hofmann	Rapid Vienna	12
9	(North Macedonia) Ilčo Naumoski	SV Mattersburg	12
9	(Netherlands Antilles) Robin Nelisse	Red Bull Salzburg	12

== Attendances ==
No.	Club	Average attendance
1	Rapid Wien	15,777
2	RB Salzburg	14,099
3	Sturm Graz	12,830
4	Austria Kärnten	9,879
5	LASK	9,006
6	Austria Wien	7,672
7	SV Mattersburg	6,274
8	Rheindorf Altach	5,799
9	SV Ried	5,134
10	Kapfenberger SV	3,662

== See also ==
- 2008–09 Austrian Football First League
- 2008–09 Austrian Cup
