= 2008–09 Austrian Cup =

Tournament details
- Country: Austria

Final positions
- Champions: Austria Vienna
- Runners-up: Admira Wacker Mödling

Tournament statistics
- Top goal scorer: Rubin Okotie (5)

The 2008–09 Austrian Cup (German: ÖFB-Cup, also Stiegl-Cup for sponsoring purposes) was the 75th season of Austria's nationwide football cup competition. It started on July 18, 2008, with the first game of the preliminary round. The final was held at the Pappelstadion, Mattersburg on 16 May 2009.

The competition was won by Austria Vienna after beating Trenkwalder Admira 3–1 after extra time. It was the 27th Austrian Cup title for the team from Vienna, who also qualified for the third qualifying round of the 2009–10 UEFA Europa League in the process.

== Preliminary round ==
The Preliminary Round involved 58 amateur clubs from all regional federations, divided into smaller groups according to the Austrian federal states. Twenty-nine games were played between July 18 and August 3, 2008, with the winners advancing to the first round.

Team 1	Score	Team 2
18 July 2008
SC Spittal/Drau	4–0	SC Gmund
19 July 2008
SV Wienerberger	2–1	SC Ostbahn 11
25 July 2008
SC/ESV Parndorf	4–2	SV Stegersbach
TSV Hartberg	0–0 (a.e.t.) (4–5 p)	Post SV Fußball
SC Zwettl	3–1 (a.e.t.)	SV Leobendorf
SV Langenrohr	0–2	FC Waidhofen/Ybbs
WAC St. Andrä	1–1 (a.e.t.) (4–5 p)	Slovenski AK Klagenfurt
ASK Voitsberg	0–1	SC Weiz
SC Kalsdorf	1–5	Grazer AK
ASK Baumgarten	2–3 (a.e.t.)	SV Oberwart
26 July 2008
Vienna	1–1 (a.e.t.) (4–5 p)	Wiener SK
SV Grieskirchen	1–4	FC Blau Weiss Linz
Trenkwalder Admira Reserves	4–0	SV Haitzendorf
SV Feldkirchen	1–2	FC Kärnten
27 July 2008
FC V. P. Sturm 19 St. Pölten	0–10	SKU Amstetten
SR-Fach Donaufeld	0–2	FAC Team für Wien
SV Würmla	3–2	ASV Vösendorf
28 July 2008
UFC Fehring	1–0	USV Allerheiligen
Union St. Florian	1–0	LASK Linz Reserves
29 July 2008
FC Wels	2–1 (a.e.t.)	ASKÖ Linz
Sturm Graz Reserves	1–4	SV Bad Aussee
FC Puch	1–6	Seekirchen
USK Leube Anif	3–4 (a.e.t.)	TSV St. Johann
SPG Union Innsbruck	5–4	SPG Axams Götzens
FC Kufstein	0–0 (a.e.t.) (1–4 p)	SC Schwaz
FC Dornbirn	0–0 (a.e.t.) (6–5 p)	SV Hall
Blau Weiss Feldkirch	0–0 (a.e.t.) (7–8 p)	FC Hard
1 August 2009
FC Pasching	6–1	SV Sierning
2 August 2009
ASK Horitschon	2–0	SV Neudörfl

== First round ==
In this round entered, together with the winners from the previous round, all twenty-two clubs from the Bundesliga and the First League, as well as the nine regional cup winners. The draw for this round was conducted on August 4, 2008. The games were played on August 14 – 17, 2008.

Team 1	Score	Team 2
14 August 2008
SV Oberwart	0–3	DSV Leoben
FC Wels	1–1 (a.e.t.) (4–3 p)	SC Austria Lustenau
FC Blau Weiss Linz	0–1	SV Mattersburg
SC/ESV Parndorf	1–0 (a.e.t.)	FC Wacker Innsbruck
FC Waidhofen/Ybbs	0–2	Wiener SK
15 August 2008
TSV Pöllau	1–3	Trenkwalder Admira
SV Hallein 04	0–7	Red Bull Juniors Salzburg
FC Kärnten	0–5	SK Rapid Wien
UFC Fehring	1–4	FC Lustenau 07
SPG Union Innsbruck	2–4 (a.e.t.)	SKN St. Pölten
SC Hard	1–2	SK Austria Kärnten
FAC Team für Wien	1–4	SV Ried
SV Spittal/Drau	3–0	FC Gratkorn
DSV St. Johann	0–3	Kapfenberger SV
SV Seekirchen	1–3	SV Grödig
SV Würmla	3–1 (a.e.t.)	SV Lendorf
SK Rapid Wien Reserves	3–0	Union St. Florian
16 August 2008
1. SC Sollenau	0–1	FC Magna Wiener Neustadt
WSG Wattens	2–2 (a.e.t.) (4–5 p)	Austria Wien Reserves
Slovenski AK Klagenfurt	1–3	1. FC Vöcklabruck
SC Bregenz	1–3	LASK Linz
SK Unterpetersdorf	1–2	Trenkwalder Admira Reserves
SV Wienerberger	4–1	SC Zwettl
SC Unterfrauenhaid	1–0	SKU Amstetten
SC Schwaz	1–4	SPG Neuhofen Ried
17 August 2008
FC Pasching	1–4	FC Red Bull Salzburg
Grazer AK	1–2	SC Rheindorf Altach
FC Dornbirn	0–2	SK Sturm Graz
SV Bad Aussee	1–5	FK Austria Wien
Post SV Fußball	1–2	SC Weiz

== Second round ==
The draw of the second round was conducted on August 19, 2008. The games were played on September 12 and 13, 2008.

Team 1	Score	Team 2
12 September 2008
SC Weiz	1–4	Austria Wien Reserves
SPG Neuhofen Ried	0–5	SK Sturm Graz
FC Wels	0–0 (a.e.t.) (5–3 p)	LASK Linz
SK Rapid Wien Reserves	2–1	SC Rheindorf Altach
SC/ESV Parndorf	1–1 (a.e.t.) (5–6 p)	FC Magna Wiener Neustadt
13 September 2008
SV Würmla	2–1	Red Bull Juniors Salzburg
SC Unterfrauenhaid	1–2	FC Lustenau 07
Wiener SK	0–4	SV Mattersburg
Trenkwalder Admira Reserves	0–3	FK Austria Wien
SV Wienerberger	4–3	SKN St. Pölten
Trenkwalder Admira	1–0	SV Grödig
SK Austria Kärnten	1–1 (a.e.t.) (3–5 p)	SV Ried
FC Red Bull Salzburg	4–2	1. FC Vöcklabruck
DSV Leoben	1–4 (a.e.t.)	SK Rapid Wien
SV Spittal/Drau	0–3	Kapfenberger SV

== Third round ==
The winners of last year's competition, SV Horn, entered in this round. The draw for this round was conducted on September 14, 2008. The games were played on October 28 and 29, 2008.

Team 1	Score	Team 2
28 October 2008
FC Lustenau 07	1–5	FK Austria Wien
FC Red Bull Salzburg	1–2	Austria Wien Reserves
SV Ried	3–2	SK Rapid Wien
SK Rapid Wien Reserves	5–1	SV Mattersburg
FC Wels	0–3	Kapfenberger SV
SV Wienerberger	0–1	FC Magna Wiener Neustadt
SV Würmla	0–1	Trenkwalder Admira
29 October 2008
SV Horn	0–1	SK Sturm Graz

== Quarter-finals ==
The draw for this round was conducted on November 9, 2008.

3 March 2009	Kapfenberger SV	1–2	FC Magna Wiener Neustadt	Kapfenberg
18:00 CET	Zimmerman 46'		Kurtisi 17'; Aigner 66'	Stadium: Franz-Fekete-Stadion

3 March 2009	Trenkwalder Admira	2–2 (a.e.t.) (4–3 p)	SV Ried	Maria Enzersdorf
19:00 CET	Schicker 90'; Hanickel 101'		Berger 85'; Salihi 117'	Stadium: Bundesstadion Südstadt

3 March 2009	SK Rapid Wien Reserves	1–1 (a.e.t.) (1–4 p)	Austria Wien Reserves	Vienna
19:30 CET	Fröschl 39'		Sulimani 83'	Stadium: Gerhard Hanappi Stadium

3 March 2009	SK Sturm Graz	1–1 (a.e.t.) (3–5 p)	FK Austria Wien	Graz
20:30 CET	Hassler 108'		Sun Xiang 114'	Stadium: UPC-Arena

== Semi-finals ==
The draw for this round was conducted on 8 March 2009.

21 April 2009	Austria Vienna Reserves	1–3	Trenkwalder Admira	Vienna
19:00 CEST	Korsós 63' (pen.)	Report (in German)	Friesenbichler 11', 82' (pen.); Pusić 75'	Stadium: Franz Horr Stadium; Attendance: 2,536; Referee: Hofmann

22 April 2009	FC Magna Wiener Neustadt	0–1	Austria Vienna	Wiener Neustadt
18:15 CEST		Report (in German)	Okotie 47'	Stadium: Stadion Wiener Neustadt; Attendance: 6,800; Referee: Einwaller

== Final ==
24 May 2009
16:30 CEST

Trenkwalder Admira	1–3 (a.e.t.)	Austria Vienna
Laschet 72'		Okotie 60'; Aćimović 94', 100'

Pappelstadion, Mattersburg
Attendance: 10.200
Referee: Thomas Gangl

== See also ==
- 2008–09 Austrian Football Bundesliga
- 2008–09 Austrian First League
