= FC Dornbirn 1913 =

Association football club in Austria

Mohren Dornbirn
- Full name: Fußballclub Dornbirn 1913
- Nickname: Rothosen (Redpants)
- Founded: 12 March 1913; 113 years ago
- Ground: Stadion Birkenwiese
- Capacity: 7,500
- Chairman: Gerhard Ölz
- Manager: Heinz Fuchsbichler
- League: Regionalliga West
- 2025–26: Regionalliga West, 5th of 17
- Website: fc-dornbirn-at
Home colours	Away colours

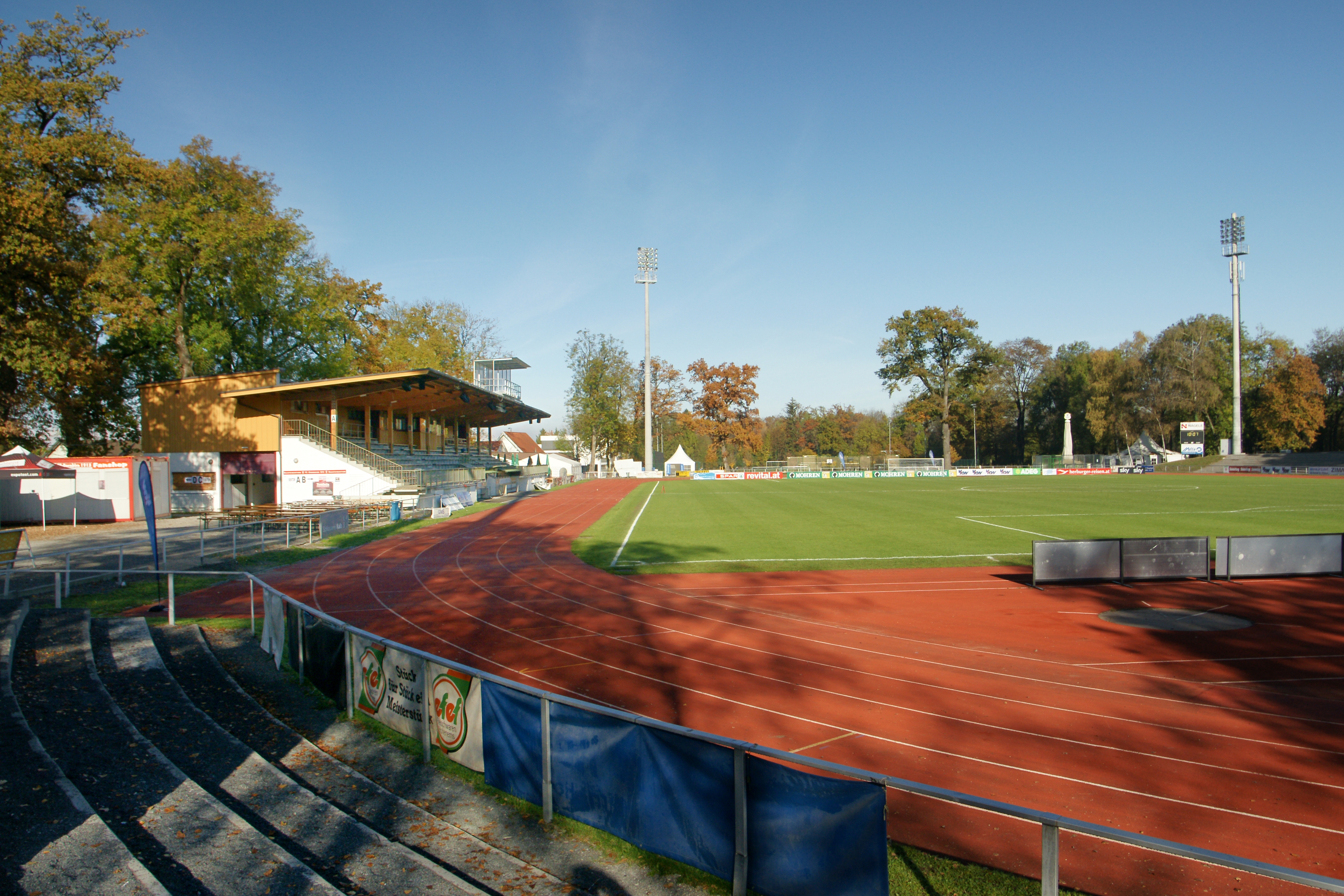
Stadion Birkenwiese, home ground of FC Dornbirn 1913

Fußballclub Dornbirn 1913, commonly known as FC Mohren Dornbirn 1913 for sponsorship reasons, is a professional football club based in the town of Dornbirn, Vorarlberg, Austria, that competes in the Austrian Regionalliga West, one of the third tiers of the Austrian football league system. Founded in 1913, it is affiliated to the Vorarlberg Football Association. The team plays its home matches at Stadion Birkenwiese, where it has been based since 2019.

== History ==
FC Dornbirn was founded on 12 March 1913 at a founding meeting in the Dornbirn Gasthaus zur Flur. The club colours were decided to be red, white and black which later changed to white and red. The city coat of arms of Dornbirn was already used as the logo in the founding year.

The club would reach the highest tier of Austrian football for the last time in the 1969–70 season, but mostly competed in the second tier of the Austrian football league system. Dornbirn has never won a major national title, but the club has been able to secure the title of Vorarlberg champion ten times and become Vorarlberg Cup winners six times.

In 1966, FC Dornbirn entered into a cooperation with Austria Lustenau, which was dissolved again after a relatively unsuccessful season. In 1979, the club merged with Schwarz-Weiß Bregenz. Under the name IG Bregenz/Dornbirn they played for years in the second division and also provided a unique curiosity in Austrian professional football. When the club had to be relegated to the Austrian Regionalliga West in the 1984–85 season due to a league reform, the second team of IG Bregenz/Dornbirn, which consisted of only amateurs, managed to qualify for the second division in the same season. Thus– "strengthened" with some of their better amateur players, the united Dornbirner/Bregenz football professionals were also able to compete in the second level of the 1985–86 season. In 1987, the "community of interests" was dissolved and the two traditional associations were re-founded.

In 1988–89 Dornbirn were promoted back to the second tier, but were relegated to the Regionalliga after the end of the season. From 2005–06 to 2008–09 FC Dornbirn played in the Regionalliga West, the third tier in Austrian football.

In the 2008–09 season, the team won the championship in the Regionalliga West and promoted to the second tier, now renamed First League. However, Dornbirn were relegated from the First League after just one season; after an 8–1 loss against Admira Wacker which included a hat-trick by Martin Pušić, the club found themselves in last place with only two more games to play. At that time, the Vorarlberg-based club had also been denied a licence for a spot in the First League after two appeals. Although FC Dornbirn would still have had a chance of securing their status as a First League club through relegation play-offs even as bottom in the table, hope was abandoned when there was no relegation from the Bundesliga to the First League. As Austria Kärnten had been denied the First League licence, FC Dornbirn waived the go to the Permanent Neutral Arbitration Court, the last instance in licensing matters, and returned to the Regionalliga West without a chance to compete for survival through the play-offs.

On 4 August 2010, bankruptcy proceedings were opened against FC Dornbirn before the Feldkirch Regional Court in response to a bankruptcy petition it had filed. The professional branch had been founded after promotion to the First League, and, according to the Kreditschutzverband of 1870, their debts amounted to around €277,000.

In the 2018–19 season, FC Dornbirn won promotion back to the second division after a nine-year absence.

== Managers ==
- (Austria) Fritz Kerr (1955–56)
- (Austria) Bruno Sohm (1959–61)
- (Germany) Ludwig Tretter (1961)
- (Hungary) Gyula Szomoray (1962–1964)
- (Austria) Alfred Schrottenbaum (1969–70)
- (Socialist Federal Republic of Yugoslavia) Fahrudin Jusufi (1972–77)
- (Austria) Johann Thurnher (1977–78)
- (Austria) Helmut Jaquemond (1978–1979)
- (Austria) Johann Thurnher (1979)
- (Austria) Walter Gunz (1987–88)
- (Austria) Günther Tschemernjak (1988–89)
- (Austria) Reinhard Jank (1997–98)
- (Austria) Alfred Wohlgenannt (1998)
- (Serbia) Rade Plakalović (1998–99)
- (Austria) Josef Schwentner (1999–2000)
- (Austria) Peter Sallmayer (2000–02)
- (Austria) Wolfgang Kaufmann (2002)
- (Austria) Erwin Wawra (2002)
- (Austria) Günther Kerber (2002–05)
- (Austria) Hans-Jürgen Trittinger (2005–06)
- (Austria) Wolfgang Kaufmann (2006)
- (Austria) Peter Handle (2006–07)
- (Hungary) József Takács (2007–08)
- (Netherlands) Armand Benneker (2008–11)
- (Austria) Peter Sallmayer (2011–13)
- (Austria) Erwin Wawra (2013)
- (Austria) Peter Jakubec (2013–16)
- (Netherlands) Eric Orie (2016–17)
- (Austria) Markus Mader (2017–21)
- (Netherlands) Eric Orie (2021)
- (Austria) Klaus Stocker (2021)
- (Austria) Muhammet Akagündüz (2022)
- (Austria) Klaus Stocker (2022)
- (Austria) Thomas Janeschitz (2022–24)
- (Germany) Roberto Pätzold (2024)
- (Austria) Roman Ellensohn (2024)
- (Netherlands) Eric Orie (2024–25)
- (Austria) Heinz Fuchsbichler (2025–present)

== Honours ==
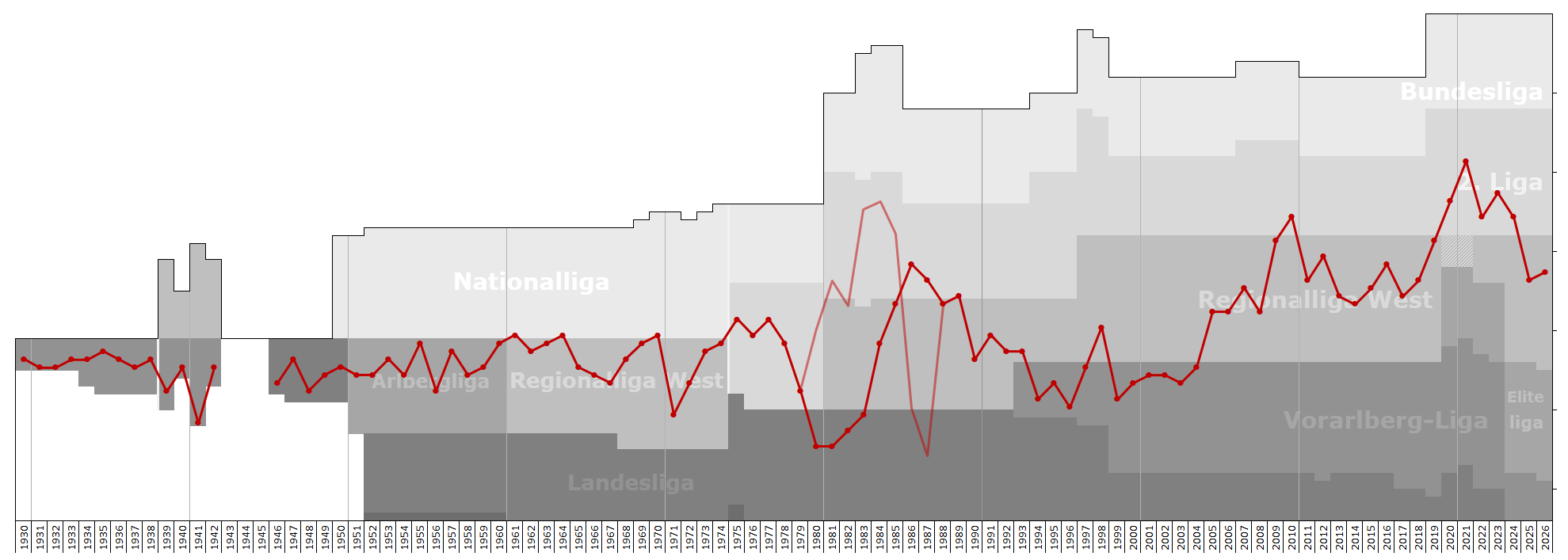
Historical chart of FC Dornbirn league performances

=== League ===
- Austrian Regionalliga West (II-III)
  - Champions (6): 1962–63, 1968–69, 1973–74, 1987–88, 2008–09, 2018–19
- Vorarlberg Championship
  - Champions (10): 1954–55, 1959–60, 1962–63, 1969–70, 1973–1974, 1974–75, 1984–85, 1987–88, 1996–97, 2003–04

=== Cup ===
- Vorarlberger Fußballcup
  - Winners (12): 1933, 1937, 1952, 1959, 1981, 1982, 2011, 2012, 2014, 2015, 2016, 2019
  - Runners-up (3): 1949, 1958, 1997
