= Franz Lederer =

Franz Lederer may refer to:

- Francis Lederer (1899–2000), film and stage actor, known in the early years of his career with the stage-name Franz Lederer
- Franz Lederer (football manager) (born 1963), Austrian football manager
