= 2008–09 Austrian Football First League =

Austrian Football First League
- Season: 2008–09
- Promoted: SC Wiener Neustadt
- Relegated: SV Grödig; DSV Leoben; 1. FC Vöcklabruck
- Matches: 198
- Goals: 553 (2.79 per match)

The 2008–09 Austrian Football First League was the 35th season of second-level football in Austria, since its introduction in 1974.

SC Wiener Neustadt, which bought the league license of SC Schwanenstadt along with most of their players at the end of the 2007–08 season due to the latter's insolvency, won the First League championship and were promoted to the 2009–10 Bundesliga. Three teams were relegated to the Regional Leagues. SV Grödig and 1. FC Vöcklabruck sealed their fate based upon competitive criteria, while DSV Leoben did not apply for a professional license and thus were automatically demoted.

== Schedule ==
Every team played each other three times. The season started on 11 July 2008 and finished on 29 May 2009. Between 29 November 2008 and 6 March 2009, no matches were played due to winter break.

FC Wacker Innsbruck had been relegated from the 2007–08 Austrian Football Bundesliga. The teams promoted from the Regional Leagues had been SV Grödig (West), 1. FC Vöcklabruck (Central) and SKN St. Pölten (East).

== Standings ==
Pos	Team	Pld	W	D	L	GF	GA	GD	Pts	Promotion or relegation
1	SC Wiener Neustadt (C, P)	33	21	6	6	65	26	+39	69	Promotion to 2009–10 Austrian Bundesliga
2	FC Wacker Innsbruck	33	18	8	7	65	44	+21	62	
3	FC Trenkwalder Admira	33	18	6	9	55	36	+19	60	
4	SC Austria Lustenau	33	14	6	13	52	47	+5	48	
5	SKN St. Pölten	33	13	8	12	51	46	+5	47	
6	FK Austria Wien Amateure	33	13	6	14	44	43	+1	45	
7	Red Bull Juniors Salzburg	33	12	7	14	41	56	−15	43	
8	FC Gratkorn	33	11	7	15	39	55	−16	40	
9	FC Lustenau 07	33	9	11	13	34	37	−3	38	
10	SV Grödig (R)	33	9	8	16	37	52	−15	35	Relegation to 2009–10 Austrian Regionalliga
11	DSV Leoben (Note: DSV Leoben did not obtain a license for the 2009–10 season and will be automatically relegated.) (R)	33	8	8	17	30	55	−25	32	Relegation to 2009–10 Austrian Regionalliga
12	1. FC Vöcklabruck (R)	33	7	9	17	40	56	−16	30	Relegation to 2009–10 Austrian Regionalliga

Source: www.bundesliga.at (in German)
(C) Champions; (P) Promoted; (R) Relegated

== Season statistics ==
=== Top scorers ===
Final standings; Source: bundesliga.at (in German)

Rank	Player	Club	Goals
1	(Brazil) Diego Viana	Grödig	20
2	(Austria) Michael Wojtanowicz	St. Pölten	18
3	(Bosnia and Herzegovina) Mirnel Sadović	Wiener Neustadt	16
4	(Austria) Johannes Aigner	Wiener Neustadt	15
4	(Brazil) Fabiano	Wacker Innsbruck	15
4	(Austria) Günter Friesenbichler	Trenkwalder Admira	15
6	(Austria) Marko Vujic	Red Bull Juniors Salzburg	13
7	(Austria) Sanel Kuljic	Wiener Neustadt	10
7	(Austria) Markus Unterrainer	Wacker Innsbruck	10
7	(Bosnia and Herzegovina) Rade Djokic	Vöcklabruck	10
7	(Austria) Marcel Schreter	Wacker Innsbruck	10

== See also ==
- 2008–09 Austrian Football Bundesliga
- 2008–09 Austrian Cup
