= Mihael Rajić =

Croatian footballer

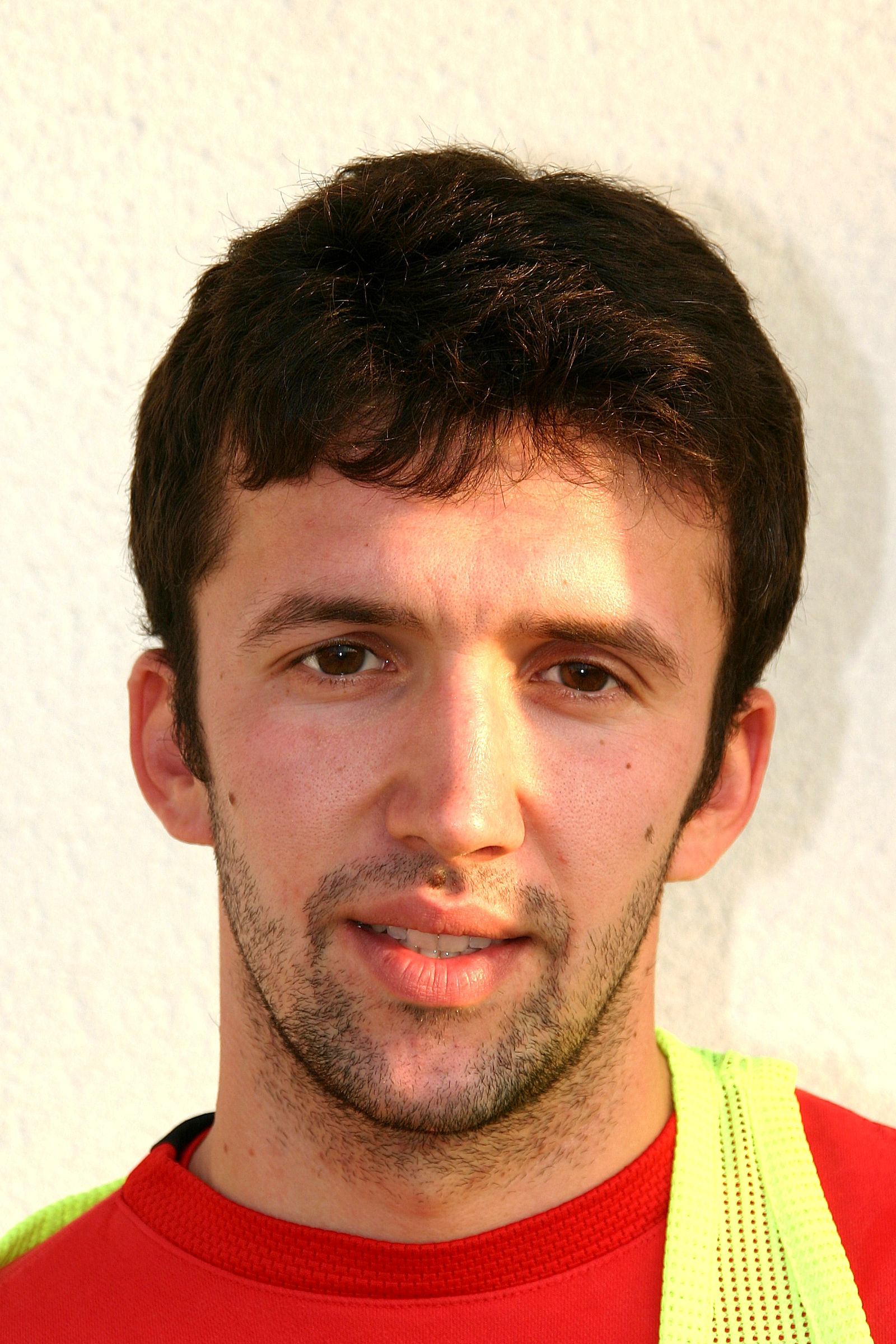

Personal information
- Full name: Mihael Rajić
- Date of birth: 8 October 1984 (age 42)
- Place of birth: Croatia
- Height: 1.76 m (5 ft 9 in)
- Position: Left back

Youth career
- USC Piesendorf

Senior career*
Years	Team	Apps	(Gls)
2002–2005	Austria Salzburg	11	(0)
2005	Red Bull Salzburg B		
2005–2008	Austria Lustenau	78	(2)
2008	Rheindorf Altach	7	(0)
2009	Vöcklabruck	8	(0)
2009–2010	Ried	3	(0)
2010–2011	Pasching	19	(0)
2012–2014	Austria Salzburg	53	(6)
2015–2019	SV Bürmoos	107	(16)
- * Club domestic league appearances and goals as of 16 May 2010

Mihael Rajić (born 8 October 1984 in SR Croatia, SFR Yugoslavia) is a Croatian retired footballer.

He spent his entire playing career in Austrian football.
