= Eric Orie =

Dutch footballer and manager (born 1968)

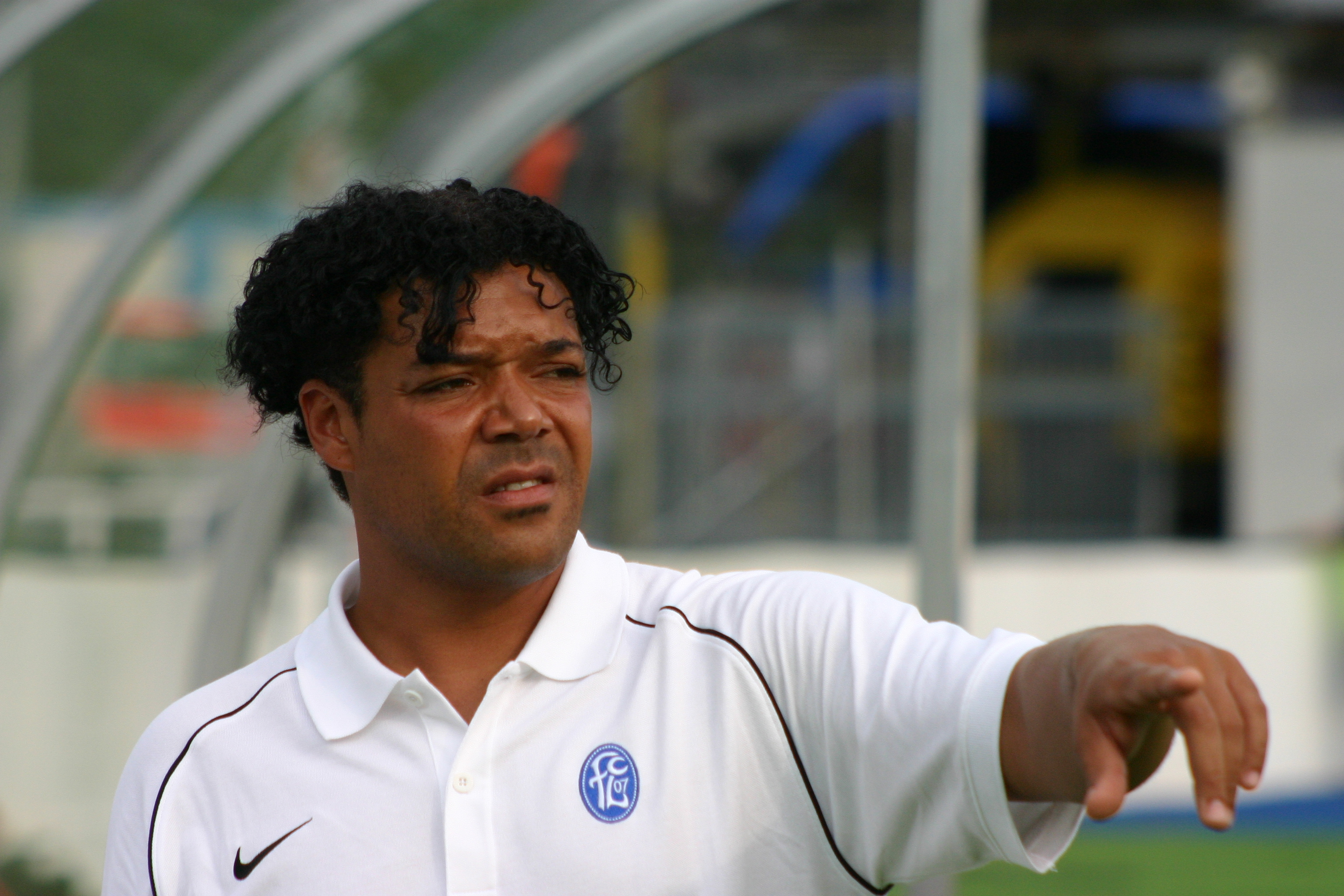

Personal information
- Full name: Eric Alexander Orie
- Date of birth: 25 January 1968 (age 58)
- Place of birth: Utrecht, Netherlands
- Position: Defender

Senior career*
Years	Team	Apps	(Gls)
1989–1990	Elinkwijk	10	(0)
1990–1992	VVV-Venlo	18	(2)
1992–1993	Elinkwijk	20	(0)
1993	Austria Wien	7	(1)
1994	VfB Mödling	13	(2)
1994–1995	Reggiana	16	(1)
1995–1996	VSE St. Pölten	21	(2)
1996	Blackpool	0	(0)
1997	Gela	8	(0)
1997–1998	ASK Kottingbrunn	12	(2)
1998–2002	FC Lustenau	34	(1)

Managerial career
- 1998–2001: FC Lustenau
- 2005–2009: FC Lustenau
- 2010–2012: FC Vaduz
- 2015–2016: FC Langenegg
- 2016–2017: FC Dornbirn 1913
- 2017–2019: Atromitos (assistant)
- 2019: 1. FC Nürnberg (assistant)
- 2021: FC Dornbirn 1913
- 2024–2025: FC Dornbirn 1913
- * Club domestic league appearances and goals

Eric Alexander Orie (born 25 January 1968) is a Dutch football manager.

== Career ==
Orie played 129 games in his professional career and scored 11 goals in Austria, Italy and the Netherlands.

He was on trial with Lillestrøm SK in the summer of 1996.

== Honours ==
Manager

FC Vaduz

- Liechtenstein Football Cup (2): 2010, 2011

Individual

- Liechtensteiner Coach of the Year (1): 2010
