= Stadion Birkenwiese =

Football stadium in Dornbirn in Austria

Coordinates: 47.41647°N 9.72409°E

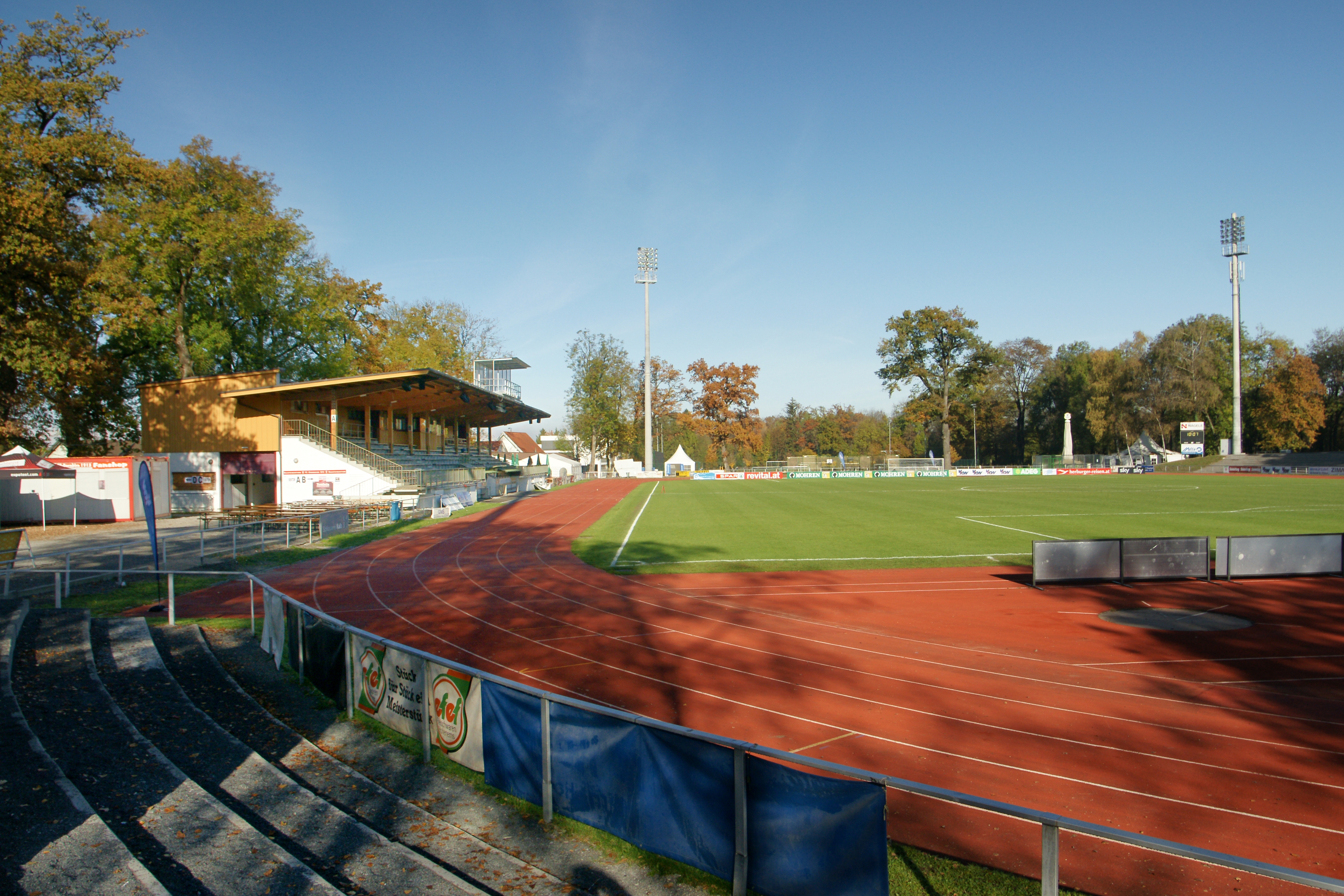
- Interactive map of Stadion Birkenwiese
- Location: Dornbirn, Austria
- Owner: City of Dornbirn
- Capacity: 7,500
- Surface: Grass

Construction
- Opened: 1935

Tenant
- FC Dornbirn 1913

The Stadion Birkenwiese is a football stadium in Dornbirn in the Austrian state of Vorarlberg. It is the home ground of FC Dornbirn 1913, which plays in the 2nd division.

== History ==
The area of the municipal sports field Birkenwiese was built in 1935 along with the neighbouring settlement. After promotion of FC Dornbirn to the 2nd league 2010, the city council decided to adapt the existing stadium area to make it suitable for the Bundesliga, especially with floodlight.
