= Rubin Okotie =

Austrian footballer

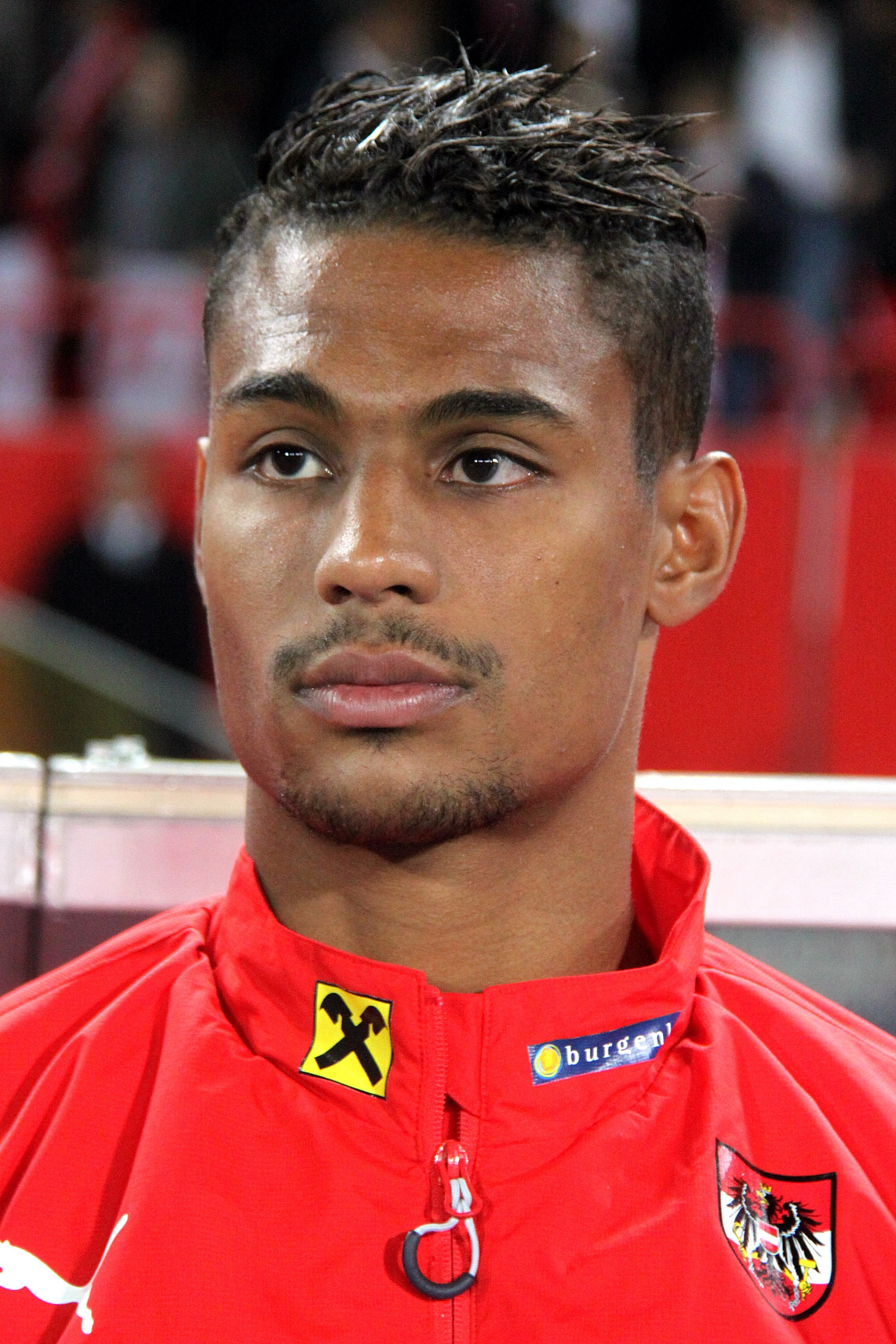
- Okotie with Austria in 2015

Personal information
- Full name: Rubin Rafael Okotie
- Date of birth: 6 June 1987 (age 39)
- Place of birth: Karachi, Pakistan
- Height: 1.88 m (6 ft 2 in)
- Position: Forward

Youth career
- 1994–1998: SC Wiener Viktoria
- 1998–2001: Rapid Vienna
- 2001–2005: Frank-Stronach-Fußballakademie

Senior career*
Years	Team	Apps	(Gls)
2005–2007	Austria Vienna II	55	(19)
2007–2010	Austria Vienna	57	(21)
2010–2012	1. FC Nürnberg	4	(0)
2010–2012	1. FC Nürnberg II	7	(1)
2011–2012	→ Sint-Truiden (loan)	9	(1)
2012–2013	Sturm Graz	43	(11)
2013–2014	Austria Vienna	13	(1)
2014	→ SønderjyskE (loan)	15	(11)
2014–2016	1860 Munich	57	(21)
2016–2017	Beijing Enterprises Group	24	(3)
2018–2019	K Beerschot VA	11	(1)

International career^{‡}
2005–2006	Austria U19	13	(1)
2006–2007	Austria U20	9	(2)
2007–2008	Austria U21	7	(2)
2008–2016	Austria	18	(2)
- * Club domestic league appearances and goals as of 21:50, 10 September 2019 (UTC) ‡ National team caps and goals as of 15 November 2014

Rubin Rafael Okotie (German pronunciation: [ˈruːbɪn ʔoˈkoːti̯ə]; born 6 June 1987) is an Austrian former professional footballer who played as a forward.

Having moved to Austria at the age of six, Okotie began his playing career with Austria Vienna. He made his professional debut in 2007 and went on to make over 50 appearances for the club before joining German side 1. FC Nürnberg. Okotie spent a season at Nürnberg, and another season on loan with Belgian side Sint-Truiden before returning to Austria to sign for Sturm Graz. A season-and-a-half later he returned to Austria Vienna where following which he had a loan stint with SønderjyskE in Denmark. In 2014 he signed for 1860 Munich where he scored 21 goals in 57 appearances before joining Beijing Enterprises Group, where he spent a full season. In 2018, he joined his final club, Belgian outfit K Beerschot VA, before hanging up his boots.

Okotie also represented the Austria national team at senior level and was part of Austria's squad at the 2016 UEFA European Championship.

== Early life and career ==
Okotie was born in the Pakistani city of Karachi to an Austrian mother and Nigerian father. Soon after his birth, his family moved to Barcelona in Spain before immigrating to Vienna when he was four-years old. Okotie joined his first football club two years later before signing for the Rapid Vienna academy at the age of ten. Three years later, he left to join club rivals Austria Vienna, where he later made his professional debut.

== Club career ==
=== Austria Vienna ===
Okotie quickly progressed through the Frank-Stronach-Fußballakademie at Austria Vienna and was playing in the second division with the reserve side at the age of seventeen. In 2007, he made his professional debut for the club against SV Ried before scoring his first goal the following year in a 3–1 win over FC Red Bull Salzburg. At the end of his debut campaign with the club he was recognized with the Austrian Bundesliga's Young Star of the Season award.

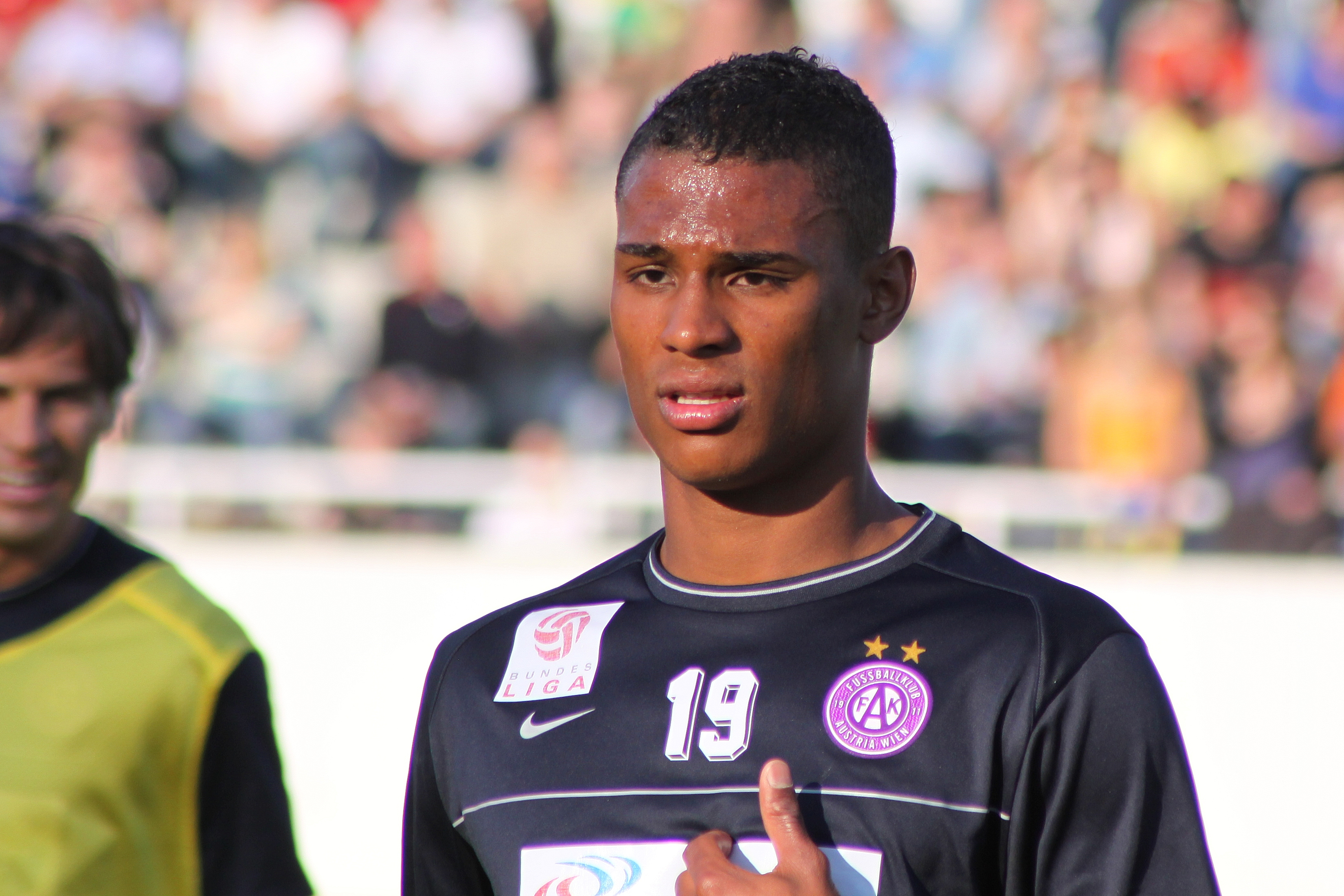
Okotie with Austria Vienna in 2009.

The following season he scored the opening goal in the 2008–09 Austrian Cup final to help Die Veilchen to a 3–1 victory over Trenkwalder Admira, and thereby claim the title. During the 2009–10 Austrian Football Bundesliga season, he suffered a serious knee injury which ruled him out for seven months, and limited him to just seven appearances for the season. During his time on the sidelines, Okotie was approached by 1. FC Nürnberg who assisted him in locating a doctor to help him in the recovery process and at the end of the season he signed for the German club, departing Austria with a return of 21 goals in 57 league appearances.

=== 1. FC Nürnberg ===
On 30 May 2010, Okotie signed a three-year contract with 1. FC Nürnberg, who had secured promotion to the Bundesliga through the previous season's play-offs. He struggled at the club, however, due in part to injury and illness, and managed to feature in just four appearances during his debut season. He spent the following season on loan in Belgium with Sint-Truiden, where he scored once in ten appearances, before leaving to join Sturm Graz.

=== Sturm Graz ===
Okotie failed to feature for Nürnberg again following the expiration of his loan with Sint-Truiden and in January 2012 returned to Austria to join Sturm Graz, initially on a season-long loan. He scored two goals in thirteen appearances on loan before signing for the club permanently on a free transfer at the end of the season. He scored 12 goals across all competitions during the following season's campaign before leaving the club to rejoin Austria Vienna.

=== Return to Austria Vienna ===
Okotie returned to Austria Vienna ahead of the 2013–14 campaign but scored only once in thirteen appearances during the course of the season. Following discord with club manager Nenad Bjelica he left to join Danish side SønderjyskE on loan. He made 15 appearances during his spell in Denmark and scored eleven goals.

=== 1860 Munich ===
After a loan spell with SønderjyskE expired, Okotie joined 2. Bundesliga side 1860 Munich on 2 July 2014 on a two-year contract. He spent two seasons with in Munich during which time he scored 25 goals in 64 appearances and proved to be a crucial player in the club's relegation survival in 2015.

=== Beijing Enterprises Group ===
In July 2016, Okotie joined China League One team Beijing Enterprises Group on a two-and-a-half-year deal. He scored three goals in 24 appearances over the next year-and-a-half before mutually terminating his contract with the club in February 2018.

== International career ==
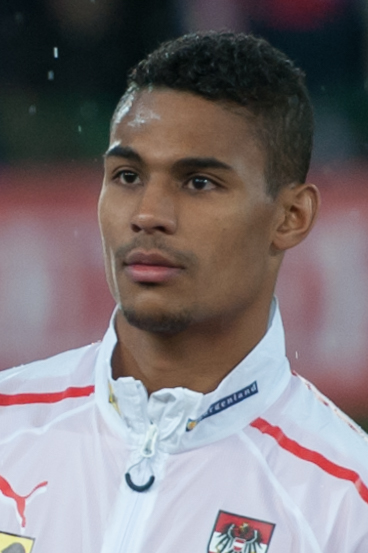
Rubin Okotie on international duty for Austria in 2014.

As a result of his multinational background, and prior to making his senior debut for Austria, Okotie was eligible to represent three countries at national level, namely Austria, Nigeria and Pakistan. Okotie identifies himself primarily as Austrian, however, stating in an interview with FIFA's website that "I live there, it's where I have my friends, and I think of myself as Austrian".

Okotie represented Austria at various youth levels and featured for the nation at the 2006 European championships in Poland and the 2007 World Cup in Canada, where Austria reached the semi-finals. His senior debut followed in 2008 when he selected by manager Karel Bruckner for a match against Turkey. He was, however, left out of Austria's squad for the 2008 UEFA European Football Championship later that year. Austria failed to qualify for the 2010 FIFA World Cup and UEFA Euro 2012 tournaments but topped their qualifying group for UEFA Euro 2016. Okotie scored twice during qualifying, against Montenegro and Russia, and was later chosen for the tournament squad.

== Career statistics ==
=== Club ===
As of 8 November 2017

Appearances and goals by club, season and competition
Club	Season	League			Cup		Europe		Other		Total	
Club	Season	Division	Apps	Goals	Apps	Goals	Apps	Goals	Apps	Goals	Apps	Goals
Austria Vienna	2007–08	Austrian Bundesliga	19	3	—		—		—		19	3
Austria Vienna	2008–09	Austrian Bundesliga	34	14	—		5	1	—		39	15
Austria Vienna	2009–10	Austrian Bundesliga	4	4	—		3	1	—		7	5
Austria Vienna	Total		57	21	—		8	2	—		63	23
1. FC Nürnberg	2010–11	Bundesliga	4	0	2	0	—		—		6	0
1. FC Nürnberg	2011–12	Bundesliga	0	0	—		—		—		0	0
1. FC Nürnberg	Total		4	0	2	0	—				6	0
Sint-Truidense (loan)	2011–12	Belgian Pro League	9	1	1	0	—		—		10	1
Sturm Graz	2011–12	Austrian Bundesliga	13	2	1	0	—		14	2		
Sturm Graz	2012–13	Austrian Bundesliga	30	9	3	3	—		—		33	12
Sturm Graz	Total		43	11	4	3	—				47	14
Austria Wien	2013–14	Austrian Bundesliga	13	1	0	6	0	—		20	1	
SønderjyskE (loan)	2013–14	Danish Superliga	15	11	—		—		—		15	11
1860 Munich	2014–15	2. Bundesliga	25	13	2	3	—		2	0	29	16
1860 Munich	2015–16	2. Bundesliga	30	8	3	1	—		—		33	9
1860 Munich	Total		55	21	5	4	—		2	0	62	25
Beijing Enterprises Group	2016	China League One	9	1	0	0	—		—		9	1
Beijing Enterprises Group	2017	China League One	15	2	0	0	—		—		15	2
Beijing Enterprises Group	Total		24	3	0	0	—				24	3
Career total			218	68	12	7	14	2	2	0	246	77

=== International ===
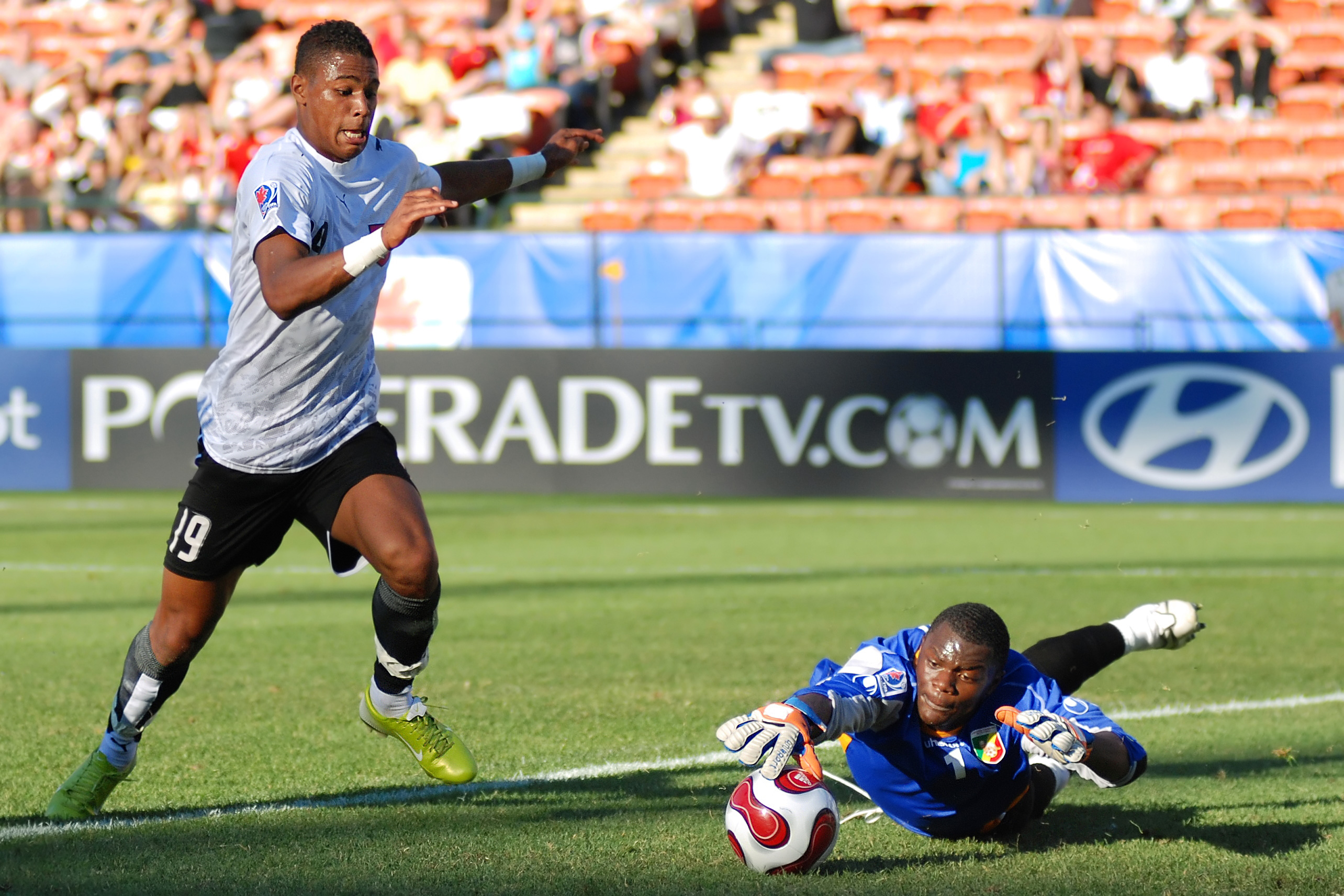
Okotie has scored two goals at senior level for Austria.

Scores and results list Austria's goal tally first, score column indicates score after each Okotie goal.

List of international goals scored by Rubin Okotie
No.	Date	Venue	Opponent	Score	Result	Competition
1	12 October 2014	Ernst-Happel-Stadion, Vienna, Austria	Montenegro	1–0	1–0	UEFA Euro 2016 qualification
2	15 November 2014	Ernst-Happel-Stadion, Vienna, Austria	Russia	1–0	1–0	UEFA Euro 2016 qualification

== Honours ==
Austria Vienna

- Austrian Cup: 2009

Austria U20

- U-20 World Cup: fourth place 2007

Austria U19

- U-19 European Championship: third place 2006

Individual

- Austria's Best Sportsteam of the Year: Austria U20 2007
