= Dejan Stanković (born 1957) =

Footballer and manager (born 1957)

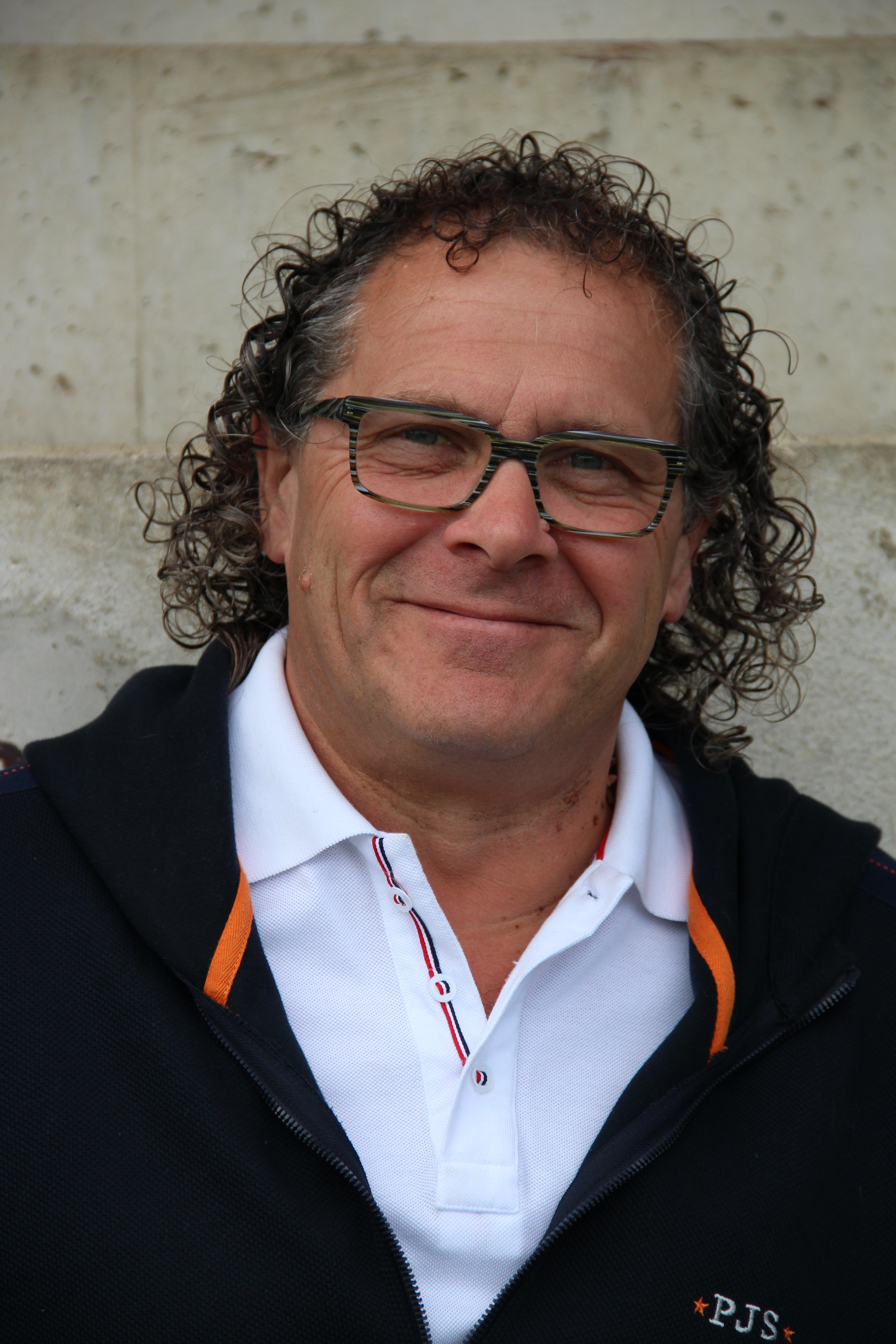
- Dejan Stanković in 2018

Personal information
- Full name: Dejan Stanković
- Date of birth: 17 September 1957 (age 69)
- Place of birth: SR Serbia, SFR Yugoslavia
- Positions: Forward; defender

Senior career*
Years	Team	Apps	(Gls)
- Red Star Belgrade
- Olimpija Ljubljana
- Maribor
1985–1986	ASK Voitsberg		
1986–1987	Krems		
1987–1996	Alpine Donawitz		
1996–1997	SC Liezen		

Managerial career
- 1997–2004: ASK Voitsberg
- 2004–2005: ASK Voitsberg
- 2005–2007: DSV Leoben
- 2008: FC Waidhofen/Ybbs
- 2009: 1. FC Vöcklabruck
- 2009–2010: DSV Leoben
- 2010–2011: FC Trofaiach
- 2012–2013: SC Liezen
- 2014–2015: SV Hinterberg/Leoben
- 2016: ESV Knittelfeld
- 2017–2020: SC St. Peter/Freienstein
- * Club domestic league appearances and goals as of 02:50, 25 June 2020 (UTC)

Dejan Stanković (born 17 September 1957) is a former footballer and current football manager. He also holds Austrian citizenship.

== Playing career ==
Stanković started his career at Red Star Belgrade for six seasons before moving to Austria to play for ASK Voitsberg. He later played in Slovenia with NK Olimpija Ljubljana for two seasons and NK Maribor. After starting with the latter in 1983, he had a successful streak in the second division. Apart from his technical skills, the then 26-year-old Stanković impressed with his speed. After two seasons, he moved to the Lower Austrian football club SC Krems. Later, Stanković moved to Styria for DSV Leoben, where he was a starter after relegation in the first division was involved. Stankovic later transitioned from striker to defender based on his experience and age, and held the latter position until the end of his playing career.

== Managerial career ==
Stanković began his coaching career with ASK Voitsberg in 1997 and managed different clubs in Austria. In 2005, he received an offer from DSV Leoben to take on the vacant coaching position. Stanković achieved a midfield position in the first division in two seasons. He also trained his son Marko Stanković with the Donawitzers, who became a regular player on the team under him. After a misguided start to the third season, Stanković was sacked a coach in November 2007. In spring 2008, he was appointed coach of FC Waidhofen/Ybbs in the Regionalliga Ost. Due to an unsuccessful match with the Lower Austrians, Stanković was replaced by Heinz Thonhofer.

At the beginning of January 2009, Stanković replaced Andrzej Lesiak as coach of First League club 1. FC Vöcklabruck. At the beginning of the 2009–10 season, he returned to DSV Leoben, which had been relegated to the Regionalliga Mitte. On September 9, 2009, Stanković left DSV Leoben by mutual agreement.

Stanković was without employment until 2011 and spent the time in training before joining the Styrian club SC Liezen in 2013. After Stanković left the club after less than one year in summer 2014, he was hired as a coach from the 2014–15 season by SV Hinterberg. Stanković left the sixth division in early July 2015 when he was replaced by Alexander Lasselsberger. From summer 2016 he then trained the ESV Knittelfeld in the Styrian Oberliga Nord (5th league) but was released at the end of October 2016 after the team only ranked ninth in the table.

In 2017, Stanković was appointed coach of SC St. Peter/Freienstein in the Minor League North B.
