= Manfred Pamminger =

Austrian footballer

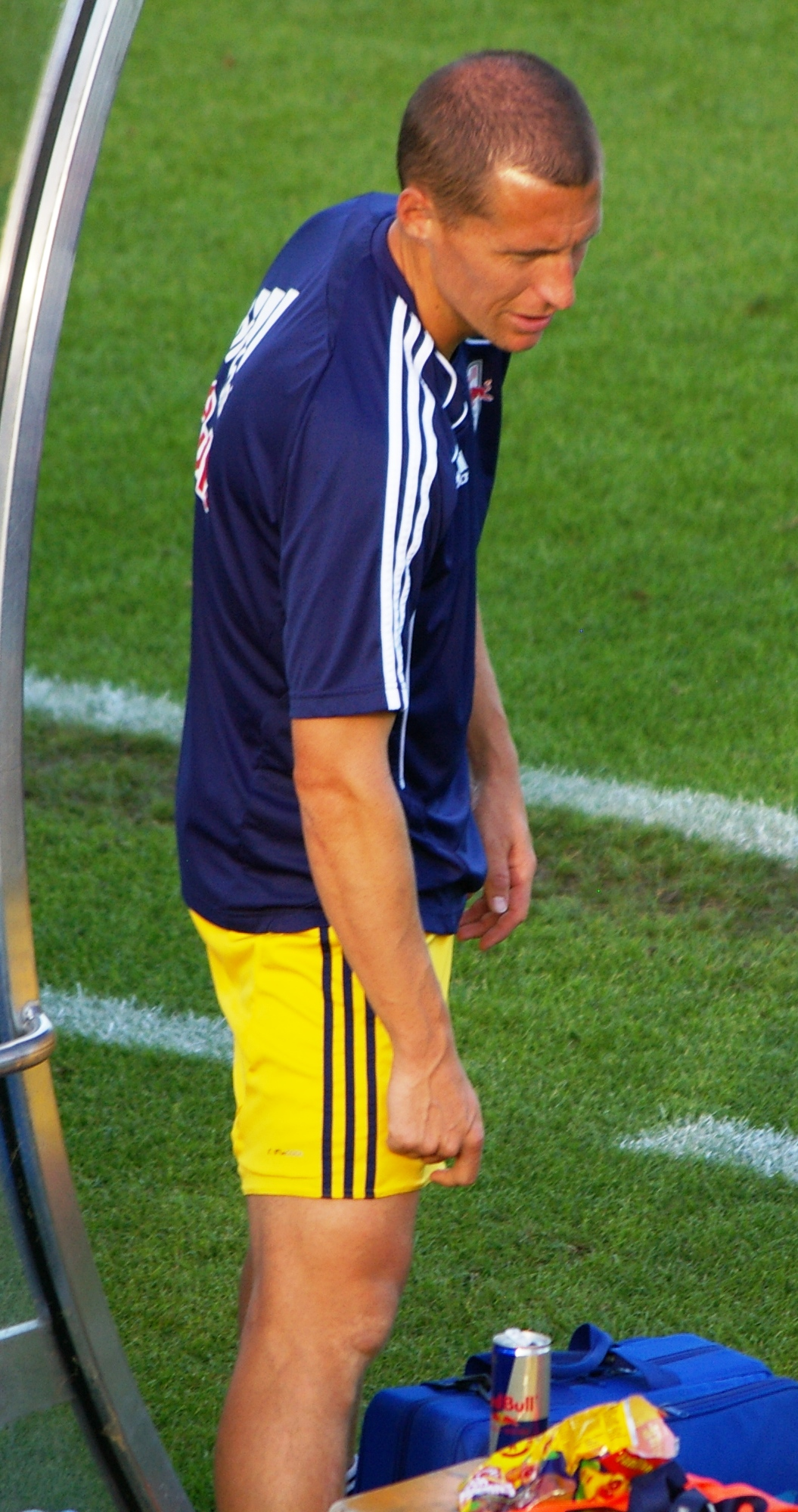
- Manfred Pamminger

Personal information
- Date of birth: 28 December 1977 (age 48)
- Place of birth: Austria
- Height: 1.80 m (5 ft 11 in)
- Position: Midfielder

Team information
- Current team: SC Rheindorf Altach
- Number: 28

Senior career*
Years	Team	Apps	(Gls)
2000–2001	Red Bull Salzburg	30	(0)
2001	SV Braunau	14	(5)
2002–2006	SC Austria Lusteanu	158	(15)
2006–2007	SK Karnten	26	(0)
2007	SC Schwanenstadt	17	(2)
2008–present	SC Rheindorf Altach	29	(1)
- * Club domestic league appearances and goals as of 14 June 2009 (UTC)

Manfred Pamminger (born 28 December 1977) is an Austrian football player currently playing for SC Rheindorf Altach.
