= Mehmed Malkoč =

Bosnian-Herzegovinian footballer

Personal information
- Full name: Mehmed Malkoč
- Date of birth: 10 December 1990 (age 35)
- Place of birth: Tuzla, SFR Yugoslavia
- Height: 1.75 m (5 ft 9 in)
- Position: Midfielder

Youth career
- 1999–2002: FC Sulz
- 2002–2005: SC Rheindorf Altach
- 2005–2008: AKA Vorarlberg

Senior career*
Years	Team	Apps	(Gls)
2008–2010	SC Rheindorf Altach	1	(1)
2008–2010	Altach Juniors	42	(5)
2010–2012	FC Gossau		
2013–2014	FC Sulz	1	(0)
2014–2015	SK Meiningen	3	(0)
2015–2017	FC Sulz II	8	(3)
- * Club domestic league appearances and goals

Mehmed Malkoč (born 10 December 1990) is a Bosnian-Herzegovinian footballer.

== Club career ==
He made his debut in the Austrian Bundesliga with Altach in December 2008; he came on as a late second-half substitute and scored in the 90th minute of the match against Sturm Graz, which Altach lost 3–1. In 2010, he joined Swiss 1. Liga club FC Gossau, where he remained until April 2012.

He spent his final years in the Austrian amateur leagues.
