= Franz Lederer (football manager) =

Austrian football manager

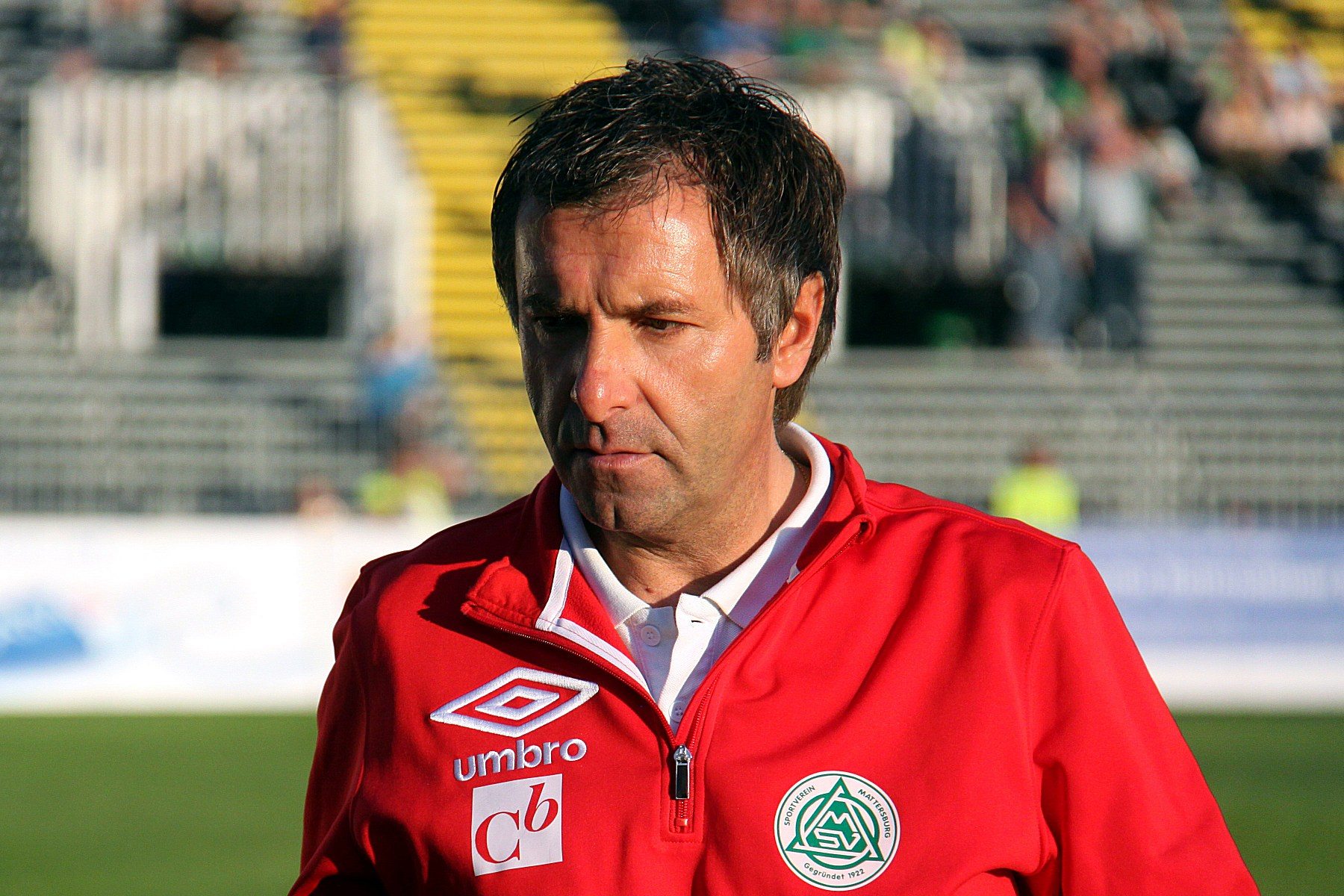

Personal information
- Date of birth: 25 November 1963 (age 62)

Managerial career
- Years: Team
- SC Wiesen
- FC Marz
- 2002–2004: SV Mattersburg (assistant)
- 2004–2013: SV Mattersburg
- 2019–2021: ASV Draßburg

Franz Lederer (born 25 November 1963) is an Austrian football manager who most recently managed SV Mattersburg.
