= Heinz Fuchsbichler =

Austrian football manager (born 1967)

Personal information
- Date of birth: 7 November 1967 (age 58)
- Place of birth: Voitsberg, Austria
- Height: 1.77 m (5 ft 10 in)
- Position: Midfielder

Youth career
- –1986: Grazer AK

Senior career*
Years	Team	Apps	(Gls)
1986–1990	ASK Voitsberg		
1990–1992	DSV Alpine	52	(2)
1992–1996	SK Vorwärts Steyr	114	(0)
1996	SKN St. Pölten	5	(0)
1996–1998	Schwarz-Weiß Bregenz	42	(1)
1998–2000	FC Hard		
2000–2001	USV Eschen/Mauren		

Managerial career
- 2003–2005: FC Lustenau 07
- 2007–2011: SC Austria Lustenau
- 2008: SC Rheindorf Altach
- 2010–2011: FC Wolfurt
- 2012: SV Ried
- 2013–2019: Liechtenstein U21
- 2019–: AKA Vorarlberg (U18)
- * Club domestic league appearances and goals

Heinz Fuchsbichler (born 7 November 1967) is an Austrian football coach and former professional player who is currently the coach of the AKA Vorarlberg under-18 team.
