= SV Mattersburg =

Defunct Austrian association football club

- Full name: Sportverein Bauwelt Koch Mattersburg
- Founded: 1922; 104 years ago
- Dissolved: 2020; 6 years ago
- Ground: Pappelstadion, Mattersburg
- Capacity: 17,100
- Chairman: Martin Pucher
- 2019–20: Austrian Bundesliga, 10th
- Website: web.svm-fan.net
Home colours	Away colours

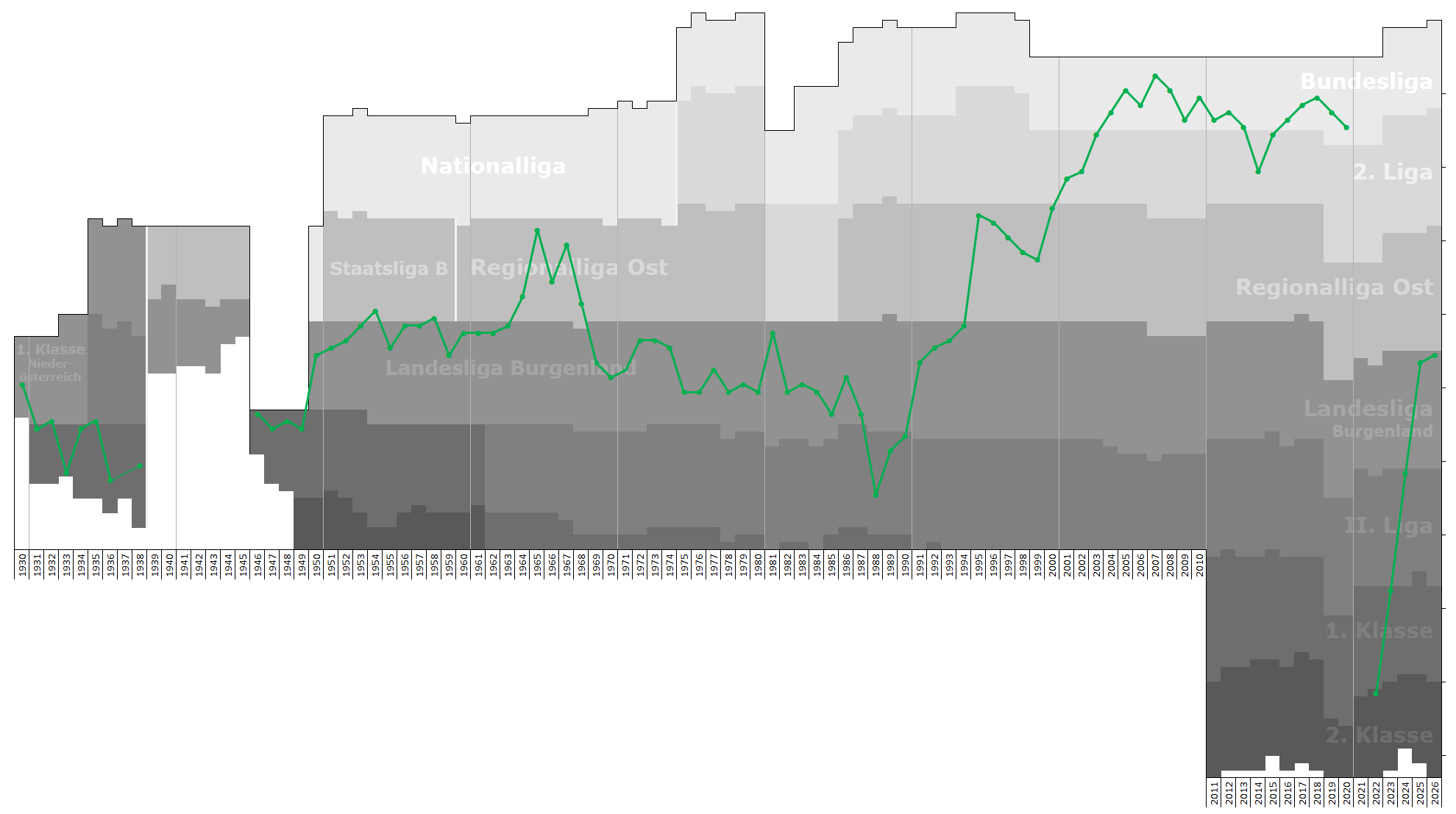
Historical chart of Mattersburg league performance

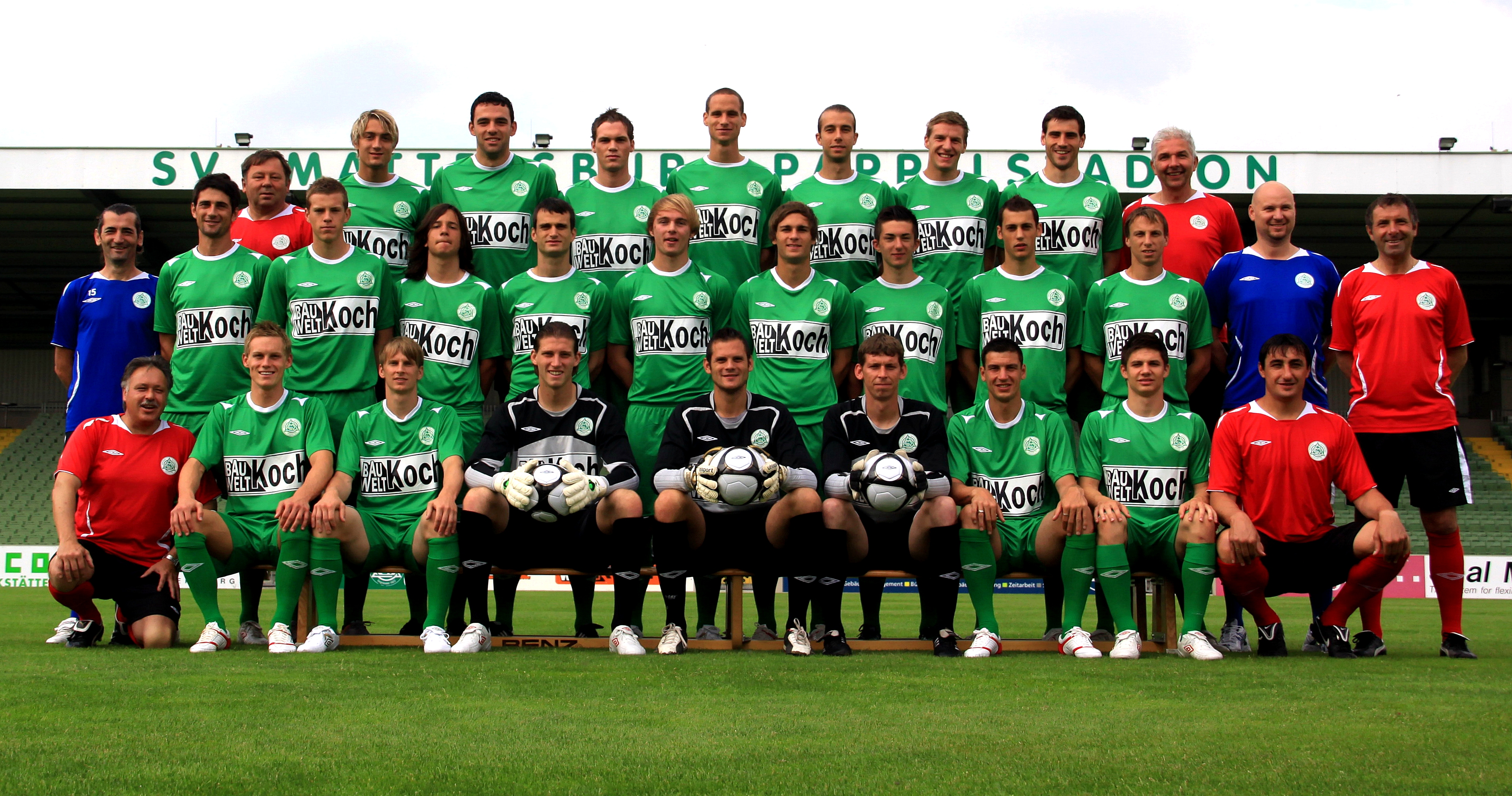
Team photo for the 2010–2011 season

SV Mattersburg was an Austrian association football club from Mattersburg, Burgenland.

== History ==
The club was formed in 1922 and played its home games at the 17,100 capacity Pappelstadion. The club played in the Bundesliga from the 2003–04 season until 2020, except two seasons between 2013 and 2015. SV Mattersburg drew large crowds, with the average crowd for the 2004–05 season being the second highest in Austria, even though the town of Mattersburg has only 6,300 inhabitants. In the 2006–07 season, Mattersburg finished third in the Bundesliga, the highest position in their history.

SV Mattersburg was declared bankrupt in August 2020 after their main financial backer, Commerzialbank Mattersburg was closed down following an accounting scandal. Mattersburger SV 2020, a phoenix club, took over SV Matterbsurg's youth facilities and in season 2021/22 started playing at the lowest regional level of competition in Burgenland.

== Manager history ==
- (Austria) Martin Wurm (1 July 1991 – 30 June 1992)
- (Hungary) Péter Hannich (1 July 1992 – 31 Dec 1992)
- (Austria) Christian Janitsch (1 Jan 1993 – 30 June 1994)
- (Austria) Karl Rosner (1 July 1994 – Sept 14, 2000)
- (Austria) Ernst Simmel (Sept 14, 2000–31 Dec 2000)
- (Austria) Günther Schiffer (1 Jan 2001 – 30 Nov 2001)
- (Austria) Werner Gregoritsch (4 March 2002 – 30 June 2004)
- (Turkey) Muhsin Ertuğral (1 July 2004 – 15 Nov 2004)
- (Austria) Franz Lederer (17 Nov 2004 – 10 June 2013)
- (Austria) Alfred Tatar (10 June 2013 – 7 October 2013)
- (Austria) Franz Lederer – interim (7 October 2013 – 20 December 2013)
- (Austria) Ivica Vastić (20 December 2013 – 2 January 2017)
- (Austria) Gerald Baumgartner (2 January 2017 –25 July 2018)
- (Austria) Klaus Schmidt (26 August 2018 –7 August 2020)

== European cup history ==
As of December 2008.

Season	Competition	Round	Country	Club	Home	Away	Aggregate
2006–07	UEFA Cup	Q1	(Poland)	Wisła Kraków	1–1	0–1	1–2
2007–08	UEFA Cup	Q1	(Kazakhstan)	FC Aktobe	4–2	0–1	4–3
2007–08	UEFA Cup	Q2	(Switzerland)	FC Basel	0–4	1–2	1–6

- Q = Qualifying
