= 1. FC Vöcklabruck =

- Full name: 1. FC RFE Vöcklabruck
- Founded: 1999; 27 years ago
- Dissolved: 2009; 17 years ago
- Ground: Voralpenstadion
- Capacity: 5,000
- Chairman: Alois Resch
- Manager: (Serbia) Dejan Stanković
- 2008–2009: 12th, Erste Liga
Home colours	Away colours

1. FC Vöcklabruck was an Austrian association football club from Vöcklabruck. They last played in the Austrian Football First League.

== History ==
After the retreat of the Sponsor Resch Eisen, Gase und Transporte notified the club insolvence on. The club was in July 2009 new founded as Vöcklabrucker SC.

== Notable coaches ==
- (Serbia) Dejan Stanković (2009)
- (Poland) Andrzej Lesiak (2008–2009)
- (Austria) Frank Schinkels (2007–2008)
- (Germany) Manfred Bender (2006–2007)
- (Croatia) Igor Pamić (2006)
- (Austria) Robert Tschaut (2003–2006)
- (Albania) Albert Kabashi (2000–2003)
- (Austria) Helmut Nussbaumer (1999–2000)
